= Members of the New South Wales Legislative Assembly, 1859–1860 =

Members of the New South Wales Legislative Assembly who served in the third parliament of New South Wales held their seats from 1859 to 1860. The Speaker was Sir Daniel Cooper until 31 January 1860 and then Terence Murray.

Name	Electorate	Years in office
William Arnold	Paterson	1856–1875
Morris Asher	Hume	1859–1860
James Atkinson	Central Cumberland	1859–1863
Lyttleton Bayley (Note: Mudgee MLA Lyttleton Bayley resigned on 26 November 1859. The resulting by-election on 19 December 1859 was won by Samuel Terry.)	Mudgee	1859–1859
John Black	East Sydney	1859–1860
Isidore Blake (Note: Hunter MLA Richard Jones resigned on 10 April 1860. The resulting by-election was won by Isidore Blake.)	Hunter	1860–1861
Thomas Broughton	West Sydney	1859–1860
James Byrnes	Parramatta	1857–1872
Alexander Campbell (Note: Williams MLA Stephen Dark resigned on 25 January 1860. The resulting by-election on 16 February 1860 was won by Alexander Campbell.)	Williams	1860–1860
John Campbell	Glebe	1856–1860
William Cape (Note: Wollombi MLA William Cape resigned on 13 April 1860. The resulting by-election on 17 May 1860 was won by Joseph Eckford.)	Wollombi	1859–1860
Joseph Chambers (Note: East Maitland MLA Joseph Chambers was appointed Crown Prosecutor for the Western Districts on 31 August 1859 and resigned his seat. The resulting by-election on 15 September 1859 was won by James Dickson.)	East Maitland	1859–1859
John Clements	Bathurst	1859–1860
Edward Close (Note: Morpeth MLA Edward Close resigned on 12 July 1860. The resulting by-election on 7 August 1860 was won by Samuel Cohen.)	Morpeth	1859–1860, 1862–1864
Samuel Cohen	Morpeth	1860–1860
Sir Daniel Cooper	Paddington	1856–1860
Frederick Cooper (Note: Braidwood MLA Frederick Cooper resigned on 14 July 1860. The resulting by-election on 10 August 1860 was won by Merion Moriarty.)	Braidwood	1859–1860
Charles Cowper (Note: East Sydney MLA Charles Cowper resigned on 17 November 1859. The resulting by-election on 20 January 1860 was won by Peter Faucett.)	East Sydney	1856–1859, 1860–1870
Charles Cowper Jr. (Note: The seat of Tumut was vacant as the winner in the previous by-election, Daniel Deniehy, had also won East Macquarie. A by-election was scheduled but Charles Cowper Jr. was unopposed and was declared elected on 8 November 1860.)	Tumut	1860–1866
Robert Cribb (Note: The state of Queensland was established during 1859, and on 10 December the seats in present-day Queensland ceased to be part of the New South Wales Parliament. These seats were Burnett, Brisbane, Darling Downs, East Moreton, West Moreton, Ipswich and Leichhardt.)	East Moreton	1859–1859
William Cummings	East Macquarie	1859–1874
William Dalley (Note: Windsor MLA William Dalley resigned on 25 February 1860 to undertake a visit to Europe. The resulting by-election on 12 March 1860 was won by William Walker.)	Windsor	1856–1860, 1862–1864
Silvanus Daniel (Note: Wellington MLA Nicolas Hyeronimus died on 27 June 1860. The resulting by-election on 26 July 1860 was won by Silvanus Daniel.)	Wellington	1860–1862
Stephen Dark	Williams	1859–1860
John Darvall	Hawkesbury	1856–1857, 1859–1860, 1863–1865
Daniel Deniehy (Note: East Macquarie MLA Thomas Hawkins resigned on 10 April 1860. The resulting by-election on 10 May 1860 was won by Daniel Deniehy.) (Note: Tumut MLA George Lang resigned on 10 April 1860. The resulting by-election on 10 May 1860 was won by Daniel Deniehy, who also won the East Macquarie by-election. Deniehy took up his representative duties for East Macquarie and was never recognised as the member for Tumut.)	East Macquarie	1857–1859, 1860–1860
James Dickson	East Maitland	1857–1859, 1859–1863
John Douglas	Darling Downs	1859–1859, 1860–1861
Joseph Eckford	Wollombi	1860–1872, 1877–1882
Daniel Egan	Eden	1856–1870
Gilbert Eliott	Burnett	1859–1859
James Farnell (Note: St Leonards MLA Edward Sayers resigned on 16 April 1860. The resulting by-election on 2 May 1860 was won by James Farnell.)	St Leonards	1860–1860, 1864–1888
Peter Faucett	East Sydney	1856–1859, 1860–1865
Henry Flett	Hastings	1859–1864
Edward Flood (Note: Canterbury MLA Edward Flood resigned on 13 January 1860. The resulting by-election on 4 February 1860 was won by John Lucas.)	Canterbury	1856–1860, 1869–1872
William Forster	Queanbeyan	1856–1860, 1861–1864, 1864–1869, 1869–1874, 1875–1876, 1880–1882
John Garrett	Shoalhaven	1859–1861
Samuel Gordon (Note: Illawarra MLA John Hargrave resigned on 11 October 1859. The resulting by-election on 28 October 1859 was won by Samuel Gordon.)	Illawarra	1856–1859, 1859–1860
Samuel Gray	Kiama	1859–1864, 1874–1880, 1882–1885
Alexander Hamilton	Monaro	1859–1860
William Handcock	Darling Downs	1859–1859
John Hargrave	Illawarra	1859–1859
James Hart	New England	1858–1872
Thomas Hawkins (Note: East Macquarie MLA William Suttor resigned on 13 September 1859. The resulting by-election on 6 October 1859 was won by Thomas Hawkins.)	East Macquarie	1859–1860
John Hay	Murray	1856–1867
Arthur Hodgson	Newcastle	1858–1860
James Hoskins	Goldfields North	1859–1863, 1868–1882
John Hurley	Narellan	1859–1860, 1864–1869, 1872–1880
Nicolas Hyeronimus	Wellington	1859–1860
Clark Irving	Clarence	1856–1858, 1859–1864
Robert Jamison	Nepean	1856–1860
Richard Jenkins	Gwydir	1858–1860
Richard Jones	Hunter	1856–1860
Charles Kemp (Note: Liverpool Plains MLA Andrew Loder resigned on 5 March 1860. The resulting by-election on 10 April 1860 was won by Charles Kemp.)	Liverpool Plains	1860–1860
Thomas Laidlaw (Note: Yass Plains MLA Thomas Laidlaw resigned on 2 September 1859 after it was discovered that he held a position as postmaster. He resigned that position and was elected unopposed on 20 September 1859.)	Yass Plains	1859–1859, 1859–1860
George Lang	Tumut	1859–1860
John Lang	West Sydney	1859–1869
John Laycock	Central Cumberland	1859–1864
Andrew Loder	Liverpool Plains	1859–1860
George Lord	Bogan	1856–1877
John Lucas	Canterbury	1860–1869, 1871–1880
Samuel Lyons	Canterbury	1859–1860, 1868–1869
Arthur Macalister	Ipswich	1859–1859
William Macleay	Murrumbidgee	1856–1859, 1860–1874
James Martin	East Sydney	1856–1873
Alexander McArthur	Newtown	1859–1861
John McPhillamy (Note: West Macquarie MLA John McPhillamy resigned on 6 December 1859. The resulting by-election on 28 December 1859 was won by Henry Mort, who was unopposed.)	West Macquarie	1859–1859
Merion Moriarty	Braidwood	1860–1864
Augustus Morris	Balranald	1859–1864
Henry Mort	West Moreton, West Macquarie	1859–1860
Terence Murray	Argyle	1856–1862
Randolph Nott	Tenterfield	1859–1860
George Oakes	Parramatta	1856–1860, 1872–1874
Henry Oxley	Camden	1859–1860
Henry Parkes	East Sydney	1856, 1858, 1859–1861, 1864–1870, 1872–1895
James Pemell	West Sydney	1859–1860, 1865–1869
William Piddington	Hawkesbury	1856–1877
John Plunkett	West Sydney	1856–1857, 1858–1860
John Richardson	Brisbane	1856–1859
William Roberts	Goulburn	1859–1860
John Robertson	Upper Hunter	1856–1861, 1862–1865, 1865–1866, 1866–1870, 1870–1877, 1877–1878, 1882–1886
Henry Rotton	Hartley	1858–1864
William Russell	Patrick's Plains	1859–1860
John Ryan	Lachlan	1859–1864
Saul Samuel	Orange	1859–1860, 1862–1872
Edward Sayers	St Leonards	1859–1860
Alexander Scott	Northumberland	1856–1861
William Suttor	East Macquarie	1856–1859, 1860–1872
Samuel Terry	Mudgee	1859–1869, 1871–1881
William Walker	Windsor	1860–1869
William Walsh	Leichhardt	1859–1859
William Watt	Carcoar	1859–1862
Elias Weekes	West Maitland	1856–1864
William Wild	Camden	1858–1860
Bowie Wilson	Goldfields South	1859–1872
William Windeyer	Lower Hunter	1859–1862, 1866–1872, 1876–1879
Robert Wisdom	Goldfields West	1859–1872, 1874–1887

== See also ==
- Second Cowper ministry
- Forster ministry
- Results of the 1859 New South Wales colonial election
- Candidates of the 1859 New South Wales colonial election

== Notes ==
There was no party system in New South Wales politics until 1887. Under the constitution, ministers were required to resign to recontest their seats in a by-election when appointed. These by-elections are only noted when the minister was defeated; in general, he was elected unopposed.
