= Members of the New South Wales Legislative Assembly, 1860–1864 =

Members of the New South Wales Legislative Assembly who served in the fourth parliament of New South Wales held their seats from 1860 to 1864: The Speaker was Terence Murray until 13 October 1862 and then John Hay.

Name	Electorate	Years in office
Maurice Alexander (Note: Goulburn MLA Charles Walsh resigned on 14 May 1861. The resulting by-election on 13 June 1861 was won by Maurice Alexander.)	Goulburn	1861–1872
William Allen	Williams	1860–1864
William Arnold	Paterson	1856–1875
James Atkinson (Note: Central Cumberland MLA James Atkinson resigned on 14 April 1863. The resulting by-election on 6 June 1863 was won by Allan Macpherson.)	Central Cumberland	1859–1863
David Bell (Note: Camden MLA John Douglas resigned on 17 July 1861. The resulting by-election on 20 August 1861 was won by David Bell.)	Camden	1861–1865
Isidore Blake (Note: Hunter MLA Isidore Blake resigned on 9 July 1861. The resulting by-election on 5 August 1861 was won by John Burns.)	Hunter	1860–1861
David Buchanan (Note: Morpeth MLA David Buchanan resigned on 2 September 1862. The resulting by-election on 18 September 1862 was won by Edward Close.) (Note: East Macquarie MLA William Suttor resigned on 14 September 1864. The resulting by-election on 6 October 1864 was won by David Buchanan.)	Morpeth, East Macquarie	1860–1862, 1864–1867, 1869–1877, 1879–1885, 1888–1889
James Buchanan (Note: Goldfields North MLA James Hoskins resigned on 17 February 1863. The resulting by-election on 7 April 1863 was won by James Buchanan.)	Goldfields North	1863–1864
Marshall Burdekin (Note: Liverpool Plains MLA Alexander Dick resigned on 31 December 1862. The resulting by-election on 29 January 1863 was won by Marshall Burdekin.)	Liverpool Plains	1863–1866, 1867–1869
John Burns	Hunter	1861–1869, 1872–1891
James Byrnes (Note: Parramatta MLA James Byrnes resigned on 26 March 1861. The resulting by-election on 10 April 1861 was won by Arthur Holroyd.)	Parramatta	1857–1872
John Caldwell	East Sydney	1860–1866
Edward Close	Morpeth	1859–1860, 1862–1864
Charles Cowper	East Sydney	1856–1859, 1860–1870
Charles Cowper Jr. (Note: Orange MLA James Martin was required to resign and recontest his seat in order to become Premier, which he did on 16 October 1863. He was defeated by Tumut MLA Charles Cowper Jr. in the resulting by-election on 4 November 1863, Cowper having resigned his seat on 24 October 1863. Martin won the by-election for Cowper's seat of Tumut on 16 November 1863.)	Tumut, Orange	1860–1866
William Cummings	East Macquarie	1859–1874
James Cunneen	Hawkesbury	1860–1869, 1872–1877
Daniel Dalgleish	West Sydney	1860–1864
William Dalley (Note: Carcoar MLA William Watt resigned on 27 September 1862. The resulting by-election on 20 October 1862 was won by William Dalley.)	Carcoar	1856–1860, 1862–1864
Thomas Dangar (Note: Upper Hunter MLA John Robertson was appointed to the Legislative Council on 28 March 1861. The resulting by-election on 15 April 1861 was won by Thomas Dangar.)	Upper Hunter	1861–1864
Silvanus Daniel (Note: Wellington MLA Silvanus Daniel resigned on 13 February 1862. The resulting by-election on 5 March 1862 was won by Saul Samuel.)	Wellington	1860–1862
John Darvall (Note: East Maitland MLA James Dickson died on 28 April 1863. The resulting by-election on 18 June 1863 was won by John Darvall.)	East Maitland	1856–1857, 1859–1860, 1863–1865
Alexander Dick	Liverpool Plains	1860–1862
James Dickson	East Maitland	1857–1859, 1859–1863
John Douglas	Camden	1859–1859, 1860–1861
Richard Driver	West Macquarie	1860–1880
Geoffrey Eagar (Note: West Sydney MLA William Windeyer resigned on 22 December 1862. The resulting by-election on 8 January 1863 was won by Geoffrey Eagar.)	West Sydney	1863–1864, 1865–1869
Joseph Eckford	Wollombi	1860–1872, 1877–1882
Daniel Egan	Eden	1856–1870
Samuel Emmanuel (Note: Argyle MLA Terence Murray was appointed to the Legislative Council on 15 October 1862. The resulting by-election on 4 November 1862 was won by Samuel Emmanuel.)	Argyle	1862–1864
Peter Faucett (Note: Yass Plains MLA Henry O'Brien resigned on 16 July 1861. The resulting by-election on 22 August 1861 was won by Peter Faucett.)	Yass Plains	1856–1859, 1860, 1861–1865
Henry Flett	Hastings	1859–1864
Robert Forster (Note: New England MLA George Markham resigned on 13 February 1862. The resulting by-election on 2 April 1862 was won by Robert Forster.)	New England	1862–1864, 1870–1877
William Forster (Note: East Sydney MLA Henry Parkes resigned on 13 May 1861. The resulting by-election on 29 May 1861 was won by William Forster.)	East Sydney	1856–1860, 1861–1864, 1864–1869, 1869–1874, 1875–1876, 1880–1882
John Garrett (Note: Shoalhaven MLA John Garrett resigned on 19 December 1861. The resulting by-election on 14 January 1862 was won by John Robertson.)	Shoalhaven	1859–1861
Thomas Garrett	Monaro	1860–1871, 1872–1891
Hugh Gordon (Note: Tenterfield MLA Robert Meston resigned on 5 November 1861. The resulting by-election on 3 December 1861 was won by Hugh Gordon.)	Tenterfield	1861–1869
Samuel Gray (Note: Kiama MLA Samuel Gray resigned on 2 April 1864. The resulting by-election on 29 April 1864 was won by Henry Parkes.)	Kiama	1859–1864, 1874–1880, 1882–1885
James Hannell	Newcastle	1860–1869, 1872–1874
Joseph Harpur (Note: Patrick's Plains MLA William Lesley resigned on 5 June 1861. The resulting by-election on 8 July 1861 was won by Joseph Harpur.)	Patrick's Plains	1861–1864
James Hart	Bathurst	1858–1872
Robert Haworth	Illawarra	1860–1864
John Hay	Murray	1856–1867
Arthur Holroyd	Parramatta	1856–1857, 1861–1864
Thomas Holt (Note: Newtown MLA Alexander McArthur was appointed to the Legislative Council on 20 June 1861. The resulting by-election on 12 July 1861 was won by Thomas Holt.)	Newtown	1856–1857, 1861–1864
James Hoskins	Goldfields North	1859–1863, 1868–1882
Clark Irving	Clarence	1856–1858, 1859–1864
John Lackey	Parramatta	1860–1864, 1867–1885
John Lang	West Sydney	1859–1869
John Laycock	Central Cumberland	1859–1864
Joseph Leary	Narellan	1860–1864, 1869–1872, 1876–1880
William Lesley	Patrick's Plains	1860–1861
Thomas Lewis (Note: Northumberland MLA Thomas Lewis resigned on 11 December 1862. The resulting by-election on 23 December 1862 was won by Atkinson Tighe.)	Northumberland	1860–1862
George Lord	Bogan	1856–1877
William Love	West Sydney	1860–1864
John Lucas	Canterbury	1860–1869, 1871–1880
William Macleay	Murrumbidgee	1856–1859, 1860–1874
Allan Macpherson	Central Cumberland	1863–1868
George Markham	New England	1860–1862
James Martin (Note: Orange MLA John Peisley resigned on 10 June 1862. The resulting by-election on 28 June 1862 was won by James Martin.)	Orange, Tumut	1856–1860, 1862–1873
Thomas Mate	Hume	1860–1869
Alexander McArthur	Newtown	1859–1861
Robert Meston	Tenterfield	1860–1861
Henry Milford (Note: Braidwood MLA Merion Moriarty died on 10 January 1864. The resulting by-election on 3 February 1864 was won by Henry Milford.)	Braidwood	1864
Merion Moriarty	Braidwood	1860–1864
John Morrice	Camden	1860–1872
Augustus Morris	Balranald	1859–1864
Terence Murray	Argyle	1856–1862
Henry O'Brien	Yass Plains	1860–1861
Henry Parkes	East Sydney, Kiama	1856, 1858, 1859–1861, 1864–1870, 1872–1895
John Peisley	Orange	1860–1862
William Piddington	Hawkesbury	1856–1877
Edward Raper	Canterbury	1860–1864
William Redman	Queanbeyan	1860–1864
John Robertson	Upper Hunter, Shoalhaven	1856–1861, 1862–1865, 1865–1866, 1866–1870, 1870–1877, 1877–1878, 1882–1886
Henry Rotton	Hartley	1858–1864
Francis Rusden	Gwydir	1856–1857, 1860–1864
James Ryan	Nepean	1860–1872
John Ryan	Lachlan	1859–1864
Richard Sadleir (Note: Lower Hunter MLA Alexander Scott was appointed to the Legislative Council on 22 June 1861. The resulting by-election on 19 July 1861 was won by Richard Sadleir.)	Lower Hunter	1861–1864
Saul Samuel	Wellington	1859–1860, 1862–1872
Alexander Scott	Lower Hunter	1856–1861
Isaac Shepherd	St Leonards	1860–1864
Thomas Smart	Glebe	1860–1869
Robert Stewart	East Sydney	1860–1864, 1866–1869
John Sutherland	Paddington	1860–1881, 1882–1889
William Suttor	East Macquarie	1856–1859, 1860–1872
Samuel Terry	Mudgee	1859–1869, 1871–1881
Atkinson Tighe	Northumberland	1862–1869, 1882–1884
William Walker	Windsor	1860–1869
Charles Walsh	Goulburn	1860–1861
William Watt	Carcoar	1859–1862
Elias Weekes	West Maitland	1856–1864
Bowie Wilson	Goldfields South	1859–1872
William Windeyer	Lower Hunter	1859–1862, 1866–1872, 1876–1879
Robert Wisdom	Goldfields West	1859–1872, 1874–1887

== See also ==
- First Robertson ministry
- Third Cowper ministry
- First Martin ministry
- Results of the 1860 New South Wales colonial election
- Candidates of the 1860 New South Wales colonial election

== Notes ==
There was no party system in New South Wales politics until 1887. Under the constitution, ministers were required to resign to recontest their seats in a by-election when appointed. These by-elections are only noted when the minister was defeated; in general, he was elected unopposed.
