= Results of the 1860 New South Wales colonial election =

Colonial election for New South Wales, Australia in December 1860

New South Wales colonial election, 6 December 1860 – 24 December 1860 Legislative Assembly << 1859–1864–65 >>
Enrolled voters	91,410				
Votes cast	46,308		Turnout	42.91 (Note: There were 17 uncontested districts and turnout is based on the roll of 66,581 for the contested districts.)	–9.63
Informal votes	48		Informal	0.17	+0.09
Summary of votes by party
Party	Primary votes	%	Swing	Seats	Change
Total	46,308			72	

The 1860 New South Wales colonial election was for 72 members representing 60 electoral districts. The election was conducted on the basis of a simple majority or first-past-the-post voting system. In this election there were 8 multi-member districts returning 20 members and 52 single member districts. In the multi-member districts each elector could vote for as many candidates as there were vacancies. 15 districts were uncontested.

There were three districts that did not have a residential or property qualification, Goldfields North (650), Goldfields South (3,720) and Goldfields West (8,400). The average number of enrolled voters per seat in the other districts was 1,394 ranging from The Paterson (536) to The Lachlan (3,592). The electoral boundaries were established under the Electoral Act 1858 (NSW).

== Election results ==
=== Argyle ===
1860 New South Wales colonial election: Argyle Saturday 8 December
Candidate	Votes	%
Terence Murray (re-elected)	unopposed	

=== Balranald ===
1860 New South Wales colonial election: Balranald Wednesday 19 December
Candidate	Votes	%
Augustus Morris (re-elected)	unopposed	

=== Bathurst ===
1860 New South Wales colonial election: Bathurst Thursday 6 December
Candidate	Votes	%
James Hart (re-elected)	341	69.5
Henry Rotton (defeated)	113	23.0
John McGuigan	37	7.5
Total formal votes	491	98.0
Informal votes	10	2.0
Turnout	501	58.7

=== The Bogan ===
1860 New South Wales colonial election: The Bogan Wednesday 19 December
Candidate	Votes	%
George Lord (re-elected)	93	95.9
John Cohen	4	4.1
Total formal votes	97	100.0
Informal votes	0	0.0
Turnout	209 (Note: Newspaper reports contained incomplete counts of 97 votes, while the 1860 statistical register records 209 people voting.)	17.6

=== Braidwood ===
1860 New South Wales colonial election: Braidwood Monday 10 December
Candidate	Votes	%
Merion Moriarty (re-elected)	unopposed	

=== Camden ===
1860 New South Wales colonial election: Camden Friday 21 December
Candidate	Votes	%
John Morrice (elected 1)	614	39.2
John Douglas (elected 2)	519	33.1
John Plunkett	284	18.1
Henry Oxley (defeated)	149	9.5
Total formal votes	1,566	99.6
Informal votes	6	0.4
Turnout	912	46.7

=== Canterbury ===
1860 New South Wales colonial election: Canterbury Saturday 15 December
Candidate	Votes	%
John Lucas (re-elected 1)	884	43.9
Edward Raper (elected 2)	629	31.2
William Roberts (defeated)	384	19.1
Richard Cowan	119	5.9
Total formal votes	2,016	100.0
Informal votes	0	0.0
Turnout	1,244	40.0

William Roberts was the sitting member for Goulburn.

=== Carcoar ===
1860 New South Wales colonial election: Carcoar Tuesday 11 December
Candidate	Votes	%
William Watt (re-elected)	202	55.0
James Murphy	165	45.0
Total formal votes	367	98.9
Informal votes	4	1.1
Turnout	371	46.5

=== Central Cumberland ===
1860 New South Wales colonial election: Central Cumberland Saturday 22 December 1860
Candidate	Votes	%
John Laycock (re-elected 1)	346	25.2
James Atkinson (re-elected 2)	335	24.4
David Bell	294	21.4
James Farnell	215	15.7
Allan Macpherson	184	13.4
Total formal votes	1,374	100.0
Informal votes	0	0.0
Turnout	1,374	36.6

James Farnell was the member for St Leonards and had already unsuccessfully contested Goldfields West.

=== The Clarence ===
1860 New South Wales colonial election: The Clarence Friday 14 December
Candidate	Votes	%
Clark Irving (re-elected)	unopposed	

=== East Macquarie ===
1860 New South Wales colonial election: East Macquarie Tuesday 11 December
Candidate	Votes	%
William Suttor (elected 1)	500	40.9
William Cummings (re-elected 2)	373	30.5
Daniel Deniehy (defeated)	350	28.6
Total formal votes	1,223	100.0
Informal votes	0	0.0
Turnout	880	39.1

=== East Maitland ===
1860 New South Wales colonial election: East Maitland Friday 14 December
Candidate	Votes	%
James Dickson (re-elected)	254	84.1
James Cox	48	15.9
Total formal votes	302	100.0
Informal votes	0	0.0
Turnout	302	35.8

=== East Sydney ===
1860 New South Wales colonial election: East Sydney Friday 7 December
Candidate	Votes	%
Charles Cowper (elected 1)	2,283	19.6
Henry Parkes (re-elected 2)	2,184	18.7
John Caldwell (elected 3)	2,091	17.9
Robert Stewart (elected 4)	1,925	16.5
James Martin (defeated)	1,551	13.3
Peter Faucett (defeated)	1,306	11.2
Thomas Duigan	327	2.8
Total formal votes	11,667	100.0
Informal votes	0	0.0
Turnout	3,771	48.4

=== Eden ===
1860 New South Wales colonial election: Eden Monday 10 December
Candidate	Votes	%
Daniel Egan (re-elected)	unopposed	

=== The Glebe ===
1860 New South Wales colonial election: The Glebe Friday 14 December
Candidate	Votes	%
Thomas Smart (elected)	393	40.8
William Moffatt	382	39.6
Geoffrey Eagar	189	19.6
Total formal votes	964	100.0
Informal votes	0	0.0
Turnout	964	44.6

=== Goldfields North ===
1860 New South Wales colonial election: Goldfields North Wednesday 19 December
Candidate	Votes	%
James Hoskins (re-elected)	unopposed	

=== Goldfields South ===
1860 New South Wales colonial election: Goldfields South Wednesday 19 December
Candidate	Votes	%
Bowie Wilson (re-elected)	unopposed	

=== Goldfields West ===
1860 New South Wales colonial election: Goldfields West Wednesday 19 December
Candidate	Votes	%
Robert Wisdom (re-elected)	383	96.2
James Farnell (defeated)	15	3.8
Total formal votes	398	100.0
Informal votes	0	0.0
Turnout	398	10.0

James Farnell was the member for St Leonards and also unsuccessfully contested Central Cumberland.

=== Goulburn ===
1860 New South Wales colonial election: Goulburn Friday 7 December
Candidate	Votes	%
Charles Walsh (elected)	unopposed	

The sitting member was William Roberts who unsuccessfully contested Canterbury.

=== The Gwydir ===
1860 New South Wales colonial election: The Gwydir Wednesday 19 December
Candidate	Votes	%
Francis Rusden (elected)	38	59.4
Richard Jenkins (defeated)	26	40.6
Total formal votes	64	100.0
Informal votes	0	0.0
Turnout	64	10.6

=== Hartley ===
1860 New South Wales colonial election: Hartley Friday 14 December
Candidate	Votes	%
Henry Rotton (elected)	190	54.1
William Russell	161	45.9
Total formal votes	351	100.0
Informal votes	0	0.0
Turnout	351	35.5

=== The Hastings ===
1860 New South Wales colonial election: The Hastings Friday 21 December
Candidate	Votes	%
Henry Flett (re-elected)	278	53.8
Frederick Panton	191	36.9
Robert Ross	40	7.7
Isaac Aaron	8	1.6
Total formal votes	517	100.0
Informal votes	0	0.0
Turnout	536	32.5

=== The Hawkesbury ===
1860 New South Wales colonial election: The Hawkesbury Friday 21 December
Candidate	Votes	%
William Piddington (re-elected 2)	unopposed	
James Cunneen (elected 1)	unopposed	

=== The Hume ===
1860 New South Wales colonial election: The Hume Saturday 15 December
Candidate	Votes	%
Thomas Mate (elected)	300	63.2
Morris Asher (defeated)	175	36.8
Total formal votes	475	100.0
Informal votes	0	0.0
Turnout	475	39.6

=== The Hunter ===
1860 New South Wales colonial election: The Hunter Wednesday 12 December
Candidate	Votes	%
Isidore Blake (re-elected)	396	80.3
Peter Faucett	97	19.7
Total formal votes	493	100.0
Informal votes	0	0.0
Turnout	493	37.2

=== Illawarra ===
1860 New South Wales colonial election: Illawarra Wednesday 12 December
Candidate	Votes	%
Robert Haworth (elected)	476	53.1
John Stewart	420	46.9
Total formal votes	896	100.0
Informal votes	0	0.0
Turnout	896	55.7

=== Kiama ===
1860 New South Wales colonial election: Kiama Thursday 13 December
Candidate	Votes	%
Samuel Gray (re-elected)	unopposed	

=== The Lachlan ===
1860 New South Wales colonial election: The Lachlan Monday 24 December
Candidate	Votes	%
John Ryan (re-elected)	248	57.9
James Martin	180	42.1
Total formal votes	428	98.9
Informal votes	5	1.2
Turnout	433	39.4

=== Liverpool Plains ===
1860 New South Wales colonial election: Liverpool Plains Saturday 15 December
Candidate	Votes	%
Alexander Dick (elected)	436	79.1
Charles Kemp (defeated)	115	20.9
Total formal votes	551	100.0
Informal votes	0	0.0
Turnout	551	39.4

=== The Lower Hunter ===
1860 New South Wales colonial election: The Lower Hunter Saturday 15 December
Candidate	Votes	%
Alexander Scott (elected)	238	51.5
Richard Sadlier	224	48.5
Total formal votes	462	100.0
Informal votes	0	0.0
Turnout	462	56.3

=== Monara ===
1860 New South Wales colonial election: Monara Tuesday 11 December
Candidate	Votes	%
Thomas Garrett (elected)	187	44.0
Patrick Clifford	158	37.2
Henry Kesterton	80	18.8
Total formal votes	425	100.0
Informal votes	0	0.0
Turnout	425	38.9

=== Morpeth ===
1860 New South Wales colonial election: Morpeth Friday 14 December
Candidate	Votes	%
David Buchanan (elected)	285	54.4
Samuel Cohen (defeated)	239	45.6
Total formal votes	524	100.0
Informal votes	0	0.0
Turnout	524	64.8

=== Mudgee ===
1860 New South Wales colonial election: Mudgee Saturday 15 December 1860
Candidate	Votes	%
Samuel Terry (re-elected)	547	86.0
James Martin	89	14.0
Total formal votes	636	100.0
Informal votes	0	0.0
Turnout	636	26.0

=== The Murray ===
1860 New South Wales colonial election: The Murray Wednesday 19 December
Candidate	Votes	%
John Hay (re-elected)	123	97.6
James Willoughby	3	2.4
Total formal votes	126	100.0
Informal votes	0	0.0
Turnout	126	17.5

=== The Murrumbidgee ===
1860 New South Wales colonial election: The Murrumbidgee Wednesday 19 December
Candidate	Votes	%
William Macleay (re-elected)	unopposed	

=== Narellan ===
1860 New South Wales colonial election: Narellan Thursday 20 December
Candidate	Votes	%
Joseph Leary (elected)	275	51.9
John Hurley (defeated)	255	48.1
Total formal votes	530	98.0
Informal votes	11	2.0
Turnout	541	61.3

=== The Nepean ===
1860 New South Wales colonial election: The Nepean Friday 14 December
Candidate	Votes	%
James Ryan (elected)	313	52.6
Robert Jamison (defeated)	236	39.7
John Smith	46	7.7
Total formal votes	595	100.0
Informal votes	0	0.0
Turnout	595	42.9

=== New England ===
1860 New South Wales colonial election: New England Monday 24 December
Candidate	Votes	%
George Markham (elected)	475	60.7
Thomas Rusden	304	38.9
John Eames	2	0.3
James Hart	1	0.1
Total formal votes	782	98.5
Informal votes	12	1.5
Turnout	794	53.7

=== Newcastle ===
1860 New South Wales colonial election: Newcastle Thursday 6 December
Candidate	Votes	%
James Hannell (elected)	374	69.3
Arthur Hodgson (defeated)	166	30.7
Total formal votes	540	100.0
Informal votes	0	0.0
Turnout	540	62.1

=== Newtown ===
1860 New South Wales colonial election: Newtown Monday 17 December
Candidate	Votes	%
Alexander McArthur (re-elected)	493	55.2
Stephen Brown	401	44.9
Total formal votes	894	100.0
Informal votes	0	0.0
Turnout	894	51.8

=== Northumberland ===
1860 New South Wales colonial election: Northumberland Saturday 8 December
Candidate	Votes	%
Thomas Lewis (elected)	240	41.1
Alexander Scott (defeated)	235	40.2
Arthur Hodgson	109	18.7
Total formal votes	584	100.0
Informal votes	0	0.0
Turnout	623	62.8

=== Orange ===
1860 New South Wales colonial election: Orange Monday 10 December
Candidate	Votes	%
John Peisley (elected)	unopposed	

=== Paddington ===
1860 New South Wales colonial election: Paddington Saturday 8 December
Candidate	Votes	%
John Sutherland (elected)	unopposed	

=== Parramatta ===
1860 New South Wales colonial election: Parramatta Saturday 8 December
Candidate	Votes	%
John Lackey (elected 1)	418	38.9
James Byrnes (re-elected 2)	368	34.2
George Oakes (defeated)	290	27.0
Total formal votes	1,076	100.0
Informal votes	0	0.0
Turnout	1,076	44.1

=== The Paterson ===
1860 New South Wales colonial election: The Paterson Saturday 8 December
Candidate	Votes	%
William Arnold (re-elected)	95	96.9
Edward Druitt	3	3.1
Total formal votes	98	100.0
Informal votes	0	0.0
Turnout	92	20.0

=== Patrick's Plains ===
1860 New South Wales colonial election: Patrick's Plains Thursday 13 December
Candidate	Votes	%
William Lesley (elected)	261	58.1
William Russell (defeated)	177	39.4
Walter Rotton	11	2.5
Total formal votes	449	100.0
Informal votes	0	0.0
Turnout	469	47.5

=== Queanbeyan ===
1860 New South Wales colonial election: Queanbeyan Wednesday 12 December
Candidate	Votes	%
William Redman (elected)	282	61.8
William Forster (defeated)	174	38.2
Total formal votes	456	100.0
Informal votes	0	0.0
Turnout	456	57.7

=== Shoalhaven ===
1860 New South Wales colonial election: Shoalhaven Monday 17 December
Candidate	Votes	%
John Garrett (re-elected)	384	55.6
Richard Kemp	307	44.4
Total formal votes	691	100.0
Informal votes	0	0.0
Turnout	712	69.7

=== St Leonards ===
1860 New South Wales colonial election: St Leonards Wednesday 19 December
Candidate	Votes	%
Isaac Shepherd (elected)	580	68.4
George McIntosh	252	29.7
James Martin	16	1.9
Total formal votes	848	100.0
Informal votes	0	0.0
Turnout	850	46.9

The sitting member James Farnell unsuccessfully contested Goldfields West and then Central Cumberland.

=== Tenterfield ===
1860 New South Wales colonial election: Tenterfield Saturday 15 December
Candidate	Votes	%
Robert Meston (elected)	140	69.3
John Ross	62	30.7
Total formal votes	202	100.0
Informal votes	0	0.0
Turnout	202	43.3

=== The Tumut ===
1860 New South Wales colonial election: The Tumut Saturday 8 December
Candidate	Votes	%
Charles Cowper Jr. (re-elected)	unopposed	

=== The Upper Hunter ===
1860 New South Wales colonial election: The Upper Hunter Monday 10 December
Candidate	Votes	%
John Robertson (re-elected)	unopposed	

=== Wellington ===
1860 New South Wales colonial election: Wellington Saturday 15 December
Candidate	Votes	%
Silvanus Daniel (re-elected)	174	76.7
E B Cornish	53	23.4
Total formal votes	227	100.0
Informal votes	0	0.0
Turnout	237	25.9

=== West Macquarie ===
1860 New South Wales colonial election: West Macquarie Monday 10 December
Candidate	Votes	%
Richard Driver (elected)	188	67.1
John Clements (defeated)	92	32.9
Total formal votes	280	100.0
Informal votes	0	0.0
Turnout	280	38.4

=== West Maitland ===
1860 New South Wales colonial election: West Maitland Tuesday 18 December
Candidate	Votes	%
Elias Weekes (re-elected)	473	90.1
William Cheater	52	9.9
Total formal votes	525	100.0
Informal votes	0	0.0
Turnout	525	37.3

=== West Sydney ===
1860 New South Wales colonial election: West Sydney Wednesday 12 December
Candidate	Votes	%
John Lang (re-elected 1)	1,751	16.4
William Windeyer (re-elected 2)	1,725	16.1
William Love (elected 3)	1,538	14.4
Daniel Dalgleish (elected 4)	1,426	13.3
John Plunkett (defeated)	1,303	12.2
James Martin	1,111	10.4
Robert Tooth	837	7.8
J G White	485	4.5
William Dalley	215	2.0
Thomas Broughton (defeated)	215	2.0
Julius Berncastle	94	0.9
Total formal votes	10,700	100.0
Informal votes	0	0.0
Turnout	3,347	54.1

=== The Williams ===
1860 New South Wales colonial election: The Williams Friday 14 December
Candidate	Votes	%
William Allen (elected)	unopposed	

=== Windsor ===
1860 New South Wales colonial election: Windsor Saturday 22 December
Candidate	Votes	%
William Walker (re-elected)	220	52.6
James Byrnes	198	47.4
Total formal votes	418	100.0
Informal votes	0	0.0
Turnout	418	65.6

=== Wollombi ===
1860 New South Wales colonial election: Wollombi Saturday 15 December
Candidate	Votes	%
Joseph Eckford (re-elected)	unopposed	

=== Yass Plains ===
1860 New South Wales colonial election: Yass Plains Saturday 15 December
Candidate	Votes	%
Henry O'Brien (elected)	unopposed	

== See also ==
- Candidates of the 1860 New South Wales colonial election
- Members of the New South Wales Legislative Assembly, 1860–1864
