= Candidates of the 1860 New South Wales colonial election =

This is a list of candidates for the 1860 New South Wales colonial election. The election was held from 6 to 24 December 1860.

There was no recognisable party structure at this election.

== Retiring Members ==
- John Black MLA (East Sydney)
- Alexander Campbell MLA (Williams)
- John Campbell MLA (Glebe)
- Daniel Cooper MLA (Paddington)
- John Darvall MLA (Hawkesbury)
- Samuel Gordon MLA (Illawarra)
- Alexander Hamilton MLA (Monaro)
- Thomas Laidlaw MLA (Yass Plains)
- Samuel Lyons MLA (Canterbury)
- Henry Mort MLA (West Macquarie)
- Randolph Nott MLA (Tenterfield)
- James Pemell MLA (West Sydney)
- Saul Samuel MLA (Orange)
- William Wild MLA (Camden)

== Legislative Assembly ==
Sitting members are shown in bold text. Successful candidates are highlighted.

Electorates are arranged chronologically from the day the poll was held. Because of the sequence of polling, some sitting members who were defeated in their constituencies were then able to contest other constituencies later in the polling period. On the second occasion, these members are shown in italic text.

| Electorate | Successful candidates | Unsuccessful candidates |
Thursday 6 December 1860
| Bathurst | **James Hart** | John McGuigan; **Henry Rotton** |
| Newcastle | James Hannell | **Arthur Hodgson** |
Friday 7 December 1860
| East Sydney | John Caldwell; Charles Cowper; **Henry Parkes**; Robert Stewart | Thomas Duigan; **Peter Faucett**; **James Martin** |
| Goulburn | Charles Walsh | |
Saturday 8 December 1860
| Argyle | **Terence Murray** | |
| Northumberland | Thomas Lewis | Arthur Hodgson; **Alexander Scott** |
| Paddington | John Sutherland | |
| Parramatta | **James Byrnes**; John Lackey | **George Oakes** |
| Paterson | **William Arnold** | Edward Druitt |
| Tumut | **Charles Cowper Jr.** | |
Monday 10 December 1860
| Braidwood | **Merion Moriarty** | |
| Eden | **Daniel Egan** | |
| Orange | John Peisley | |
| Upper Hunter | **John Robertson** | |
| West Macquarie | Richard Driver | **John Findlater Clements** |
Tuesday 11 December 1860
| Carcoar | **William Watt** | James Murphy |
| East Macquarie | **William Cummings**; William Suttor | **Daniel Deniehy** |
| Monaro | Thomas Garrett | Patrick Clifford; Henry Kesterton |
Wednesday 12 December 1860
| Hunter | **Isidore Blake** | Peter Faucett |
| Illawarra | Robert Haworth | John Stewart |
| Queanbeyan | William Redman | **William Forster** |
| West Sydney | Daniel Dalgleish; **John Lang**; William Love; **William Windeyer** | Julius Berncastle; **Thomas Broughton**; William Dalley; James Martin; **John Plunkett**; Robert Tooth; J G White |
Thursday 13 December 1860
| Kiama | **Samuel Gray** | |
| Patrick's Plains | William Lesley | Walter Rotton; **William Russell** |
Friday 14 December 1860
| Clarence | **Clark Irving** | |
| East Maitland | **James Dickson** | James Cox |
| Glebe | Thomas Smart | Geoffrey Eagar; William Moffatt |
| Hartley | Henry Rotton | William Russell |
| Morpeth | David Buchanan | **Samuel Cohen** |
| Nepean | James Ryan | **Robert Jamison**; John Smith |
| Williams | William Allen | |
Saturday 15 December 1860
| Canterbury | **John Lucas**; Edward Raper | Richard Cowan; **William Roberts** |
| Hume | Thomas Mate | **Morris Asher** |
| Liverpool Plains | Alexander Dick | **Charles Kemp** |
| Lower Hunter | Alexander Scott | Richard Sadleir |
| Mudgee | **Samuel Terry** | James Martin |
| Tenterfield | Robert Meston | John Ross |
| Wellington | **Silvanus Daniel** | E B Cornish |
| Wollombi | **Joseph Eckford** | |
| Yass Plains | Henry O'Brien | |
Monday 17 December 1860
| Newtown | **Alexander McArthur** | Stephen Brown |
| Shoalhaven | **John Garrett** | Richard Kemp |
Tuesday 18 December 1860
| West Maitland | **Elias Weekes** | William Cheater |
Wednesday 19 December 1860
| Balranald | **Augustus Morris** | |
| Bogan | **George Lord** | John Cohen |
| Goldfields North | **James Hoskins** | |
| Goldfields South | **Bowie Wilson** | |
| Goldfields West | **Robert Wisdom** | **James Farnell** |
| Gwydir | Francis Rusden | **Richard Jenkins** |
| Murray | **John Hay** | James Willoughby |
| Murrumbidgee | **William Macleay** | |
| St Leonards | Isaac Shepherd | James Martin; George McIntosh |
Thursday 20 December 1860
| Narellan | Joseph Leary | **John Hurley** |
Friday 21 December 1860
| Camden | John Douglas; John Morrice | **Henry Oxley**; John Plunkett |
| Hastings | **Henry Flett** | Isaac Aaron; Frederick Panton; Robert Ross |
| Hawkesbury | James Cunneen; **William Piddington** | |
Saturday 22 December 1860
| Central Cumberland | **James Atkinson**; **John Laycock** | David Bell; James Farnell; Allan Macpherson |
| Windsor | **William Walker** | **James Byrnes** |
Monday 24 December 1860
| Lachlan | **John Ryan** | James Martin |
| New England | George Markham | James Eames; **James Hart**; Thomas Rusden |

== See also ==
- Members of the New South Wales Legislative Assembly, 1860–1864
