= List of New South Wales state by-elections =

This is a list of by-elections for the New South Wales Legislative Assembly. A by-election may be held when a member's seat becomes vacant through resignation, death or some other reasons. These are referred to as casual vacancies.

- Brackets around a date (D/M/Y) indicate that the candidate was unopposed when nominations closed or that, as a result of an appeal against an election result, the sitting member was replaced by the appellant. These candidates were declared "elected unopposed" with effect from the date of the closing of nominations or appeal decision, and there was no need to hold a by-election.
- By-elections which resulted in a change in party representation are highlighted as: Gains for the Labor Party and its splinter groups in red; for the Liberal Party and its predecessors in blue; for the National Party and its predecessors in green; for independents and minor parties in grey; for the Free Trade Party in yellow and for the Protectionist Party in cyan.

== Fifty-eighth Legislative Assembly 2023–2027 ==
By-election	Incumbent	Party	Reason	Date	Winner	Party
Kiama	Gareth Ward	Independent	Resigned moments before expulsion for sexual assault conviction	13 September 2025	Katelin McInerney	Labor
Port Macquarie	Leslie Williams	Liberal	Resigned	15 March 2025	Robert Dwyer	Liberal
Pittwater	Rory Amon	Liberal	Resigned	19 October 2024	Jacqui Scruby	Independent
Epping	Dominic Perrottet	Liberal	Resigned	19 October 2024	Monica Tudehope	Liberal
Hornsby	Matt Kean	Liberal	Resigned	19 October 2024	James Wallace	Liberal
Northern Tablelands	Adam Marshall	National	Resigned	22 June 2024	Brendan Moylan	National
== Fifty-seventh Legislative Assembly 2019–2023 ==
By-election	Incumbent	Party	Reason	Date	Winner	Party
Bega	Andrew Constance	Liberal	Resigned to contest federal seat of Gilmore	12 February 2022	Michael Holland	Labor
Monaro	John Barilaro	National	Resigned	12 February 2022	Nichole Overall	National
Strathfield	Jodi McKay	Labor	Resigned	12 February 2022	Jason Yat-Sen Li	Labor
Willoughby	Gladys Berejiklian	Liberal	Resigned due to ICAC investigation.	12 February 2022	Tim James	Liberal
Upper Hunter	Michael Johnsen	National	Resigned due to police investigation	22 May 2021	Dave Layzell	National
== Fifty-sixth Legislative Assembly 2015–2019 ==
By-election	Incumbent	Party	Reason	Date	Winner	Party
Wagga Wagga	Daryl Maguire	Liberal	Resigned due to ICAC investigation	8 September 2018	Joe McGirr	Independent
Blacktown	John Robertson	Labor	Resigned	14 October 2017	Stephen Bali	Labor
Cootamundra	Katrina Hodgkinson	National	Resigned	14 October 2017	Steph Cooke	National
Murray	Adrian Piccoli	National	Resigned	14 October 2017	Austin Evans	National
Gosford	Kathy Smith	Labor	Resigned due to ill health	8 April 2017	Liesl Tesch	Labor
Manly	Mike Baird	Liberal	Resigned	8 April 2017	James Griffin	Liberal
North Shore	Jillian Skinner	Liberal	Resigned	8 April 2017	Felicity Wilson	Liberal
Canterbury	Linda Burney	Labor	Resigned to contest federal seat of Barton	12 November 2016	Sophie Cotsis	Labor
Orange	Andrew Gee	National	Resigned to contest federal seat of Calare	12 November 2016	Philip Donato	SFF
Wollongong	Noreen Hay	Labor	Resigned	12 November 2016	Paul Scully	Labor
== Fifty-fifth Legislative Assembly 2011–2015 ==
By-election	Incumbent	Party	Reason	Date	Winner	Party
Newcastle	Tim Owen	Liberal	Resigned due to ICAC investigation	25 October 2014	Tim Crakanthorp	Labor
Charlestown	Andrew Cornwell	Liberal	Resigned due to ICAC investigation	25 October 2014	Jodie Harrison	Labor
Miranda	Graham Annesley	Liberal	Resigned to become CEO of Gold Coast Titans rugby league team	19 October 2013	Barry Collier	Labor
Northern Tablelands	Richard Torbay	Independent	Resigned	25 May 2013	Adam Marshall	National
Sydney	Clover Moore	Independent	Resigned due to new state laws preventing dual membership of state parliament and local council	27 October 2012	Alex Greenwich	Independent
Heffron	Kristina Keneally	Labor	Resigned after being appointed CEO of Basketball Australia	25 August 2012	Ron Hoenig	Labor
Clarence	Steve Cansdell	National	Resigned after falsifying a statutory declaration regarding a speeding offence	19 November 2011	Chris Gulaptis	National
== Fifty-fourth Legislative Assembly 2007–2011 ==
By-election	Incumbent	Party	Reason	Date	Winner	Party
Penrith	Karyn Paluzzano	Labor	Resigned after misleading ICAC	19 June 2010	Stuart Ayres	Liberal
Ryde	John Watkins	Labor	Resigned to spend time with family	18 October 2008	Victor Dominello	Liberal
Port Macquarie	Rob Oakeshott	Independent	Resigned to contest federal Lyne by-election	18 October 2008	Peter Besseling	Independent
Lakemba	Morris Iemma	Labor	Resigned after losing confidence of caucus	18 October 2008	Robert Furolo	Labor
Cabramatta	Reba Meagher	Labor	Resigned after being dismissed from cabinet	18 October 2008	Nick Lalich	Labor
== Fifty-third Legislative Assembly 2003–2007 ==
By-election	Incumbent	Party	Reason	Date	Winner	Party
Pittwater	John Brogden	Liberal	Ill health	26 November 2005	Alex McTaggart	Independent
Macquarie Fields	Craig Knowles	Labor	Resigned after it became apparent that he would not become Premier	17 September 2005	Steven Chaytor	Labor
Maroubra	Bob Carr	Labor	Resigned as Premier	17 September 2005	Michael Daley	Labor
Marrickville	Andrew Refshauge	Labor	Resigned as Deputy Premier	17 September 2005	Carmel Tebbutt	Labor
Dubbo	Tony McGrane	Independent	Death	20 November 2004	Dawn Fardell	Independent
== Fifty-second Legislative Assembly 1999–2003 ==
By-election	Incumbent	Party	Reason	Date	Winner	Party
Hornsby	Stephen O'Doherty	Liberal	Resigned	23 February 2002	Judy Hopwood	Liberal
Tamworth	Tony Windsor	Independent	Resigned to contest federal seat of New England at 2001 election	8 December 2001	John Cull	National
Auburn	Peter Nagle	Labor	Ill health	8 September 2001	Barbara Perry	Labor
Campbelltown	Michael Knight	Labor	Resigned after completion of term as Olympics Minister	3 February 2001	Graham West	Labor
== Fifty-first Legislative Assembly 1995–1999 ==
By-election	Incumbent	Party	Reason	Date	Winner	Party
Sutherland	Chris Downy	Liberal	Resigned	12 February 1997	Lorna Stone	Liberal
Port Macquarie	Wendy Machin	National	Resigned	30 November 1996	Rob Oakeshott	National
Clarence	Ian Causley	National	Resigned to contest federal seat of Page at the 1996 election	25 May 1996	Harry Woods	Labor
Orange	Garry West	National	Resigned	25 May 1996	Russell Turner	National
Pittwater	Jim Longley	Liberal	Resigned	25 May 1996	John Brogden	Liberal
Southern Highlands	John Fahey	Liberal	Resigned to contest federal seat of Macarthur at the 1996 election	25 May 1996	Peta Seaton	Liberal
Strathfield	Paul Zammit	Liberal	Resigned to contest federal seat of Lowe at the 1996 election	25 May 1996	Bruce MacCarthy	Liberal
== Fiftieth Legislative Assembly 1991–1995 ==
By-election	Incumbent	Party	Reason	Date	Winner	Party
Cabramatta	John Newman	Labor	Assassinated by Phuong Ngo	22 October 1994	Reba Meagher	Labor
Parramatta	Andrew Ziolkowski	Labor	Death	27 August 1994	Gabrielle Harrison	Labor
Vaucluse	Michael Yabsley	Liberal	Resigned	9 April 1994	Peter Debnam	Liberal
North Shore	Phillip Smiles	Liberal	Resigned	5 February 1994	Jillian Skinner	Liberal
The Hills	Tony Packard	Liberal	Resigned after involvement in a business scandal	28 August 1993	Michael Richardson	Liberal
Gordon	Tim Moore	Liberal	Resigned (see Metherell affair)	22 August 1992	Jeremy Kinross	Liberal
Ku-ring-gai	Nick Greiner	Liberal	Resigned after losing Premiership (see Metherell affair)	22 August 1992	Stephen O'Doherty	Liberal
Davidson	Terry Metherell	Independent	Accepted an appointment in the public service (see Metherell affair)	2 May 1992	Andrew Humpherson	Liberal
The Entrance	Bob Graham	Liberal	Result overturned by the Court of Disputed Returns	18 January 1992	Grant McBride	Labor
== Forty-ninth Legislative Assembly 1988–1991 ==
By-election	Incumbent	Party	Reason	Date	Winner	Party
Coffs Harbour	Matt Singleton	National	Resigned	3 November 1990	Andrew Fraser	National
Macquarie Fields	Stan Knowles	Labor	Resigned	3 November 1990	Craig Knowles	Labor
The Hills	Fred Caterson	Liberal	Resigned	1 September 1990	Tony Packard	Liberal
Granville	Laurie Ferguson	Labor	Successfully contested the federal seat of Reid at the 1990 election	23 June 1990	Kim Yeadon	Labor
Heffron	Laurie Brereton	Labor	Successfully contested the federal seat of Kingsford-Smith at the 1990 election	23 June 1990	Deirdre Grusovin	Labor
Smithfield	Janice Crosio	Labor	Successfully contested the federal seat of Prospect at the 1990 election	23 June 1990	Carl Scully	Labor
Liverpool	George Paciullo	Labor	Resigned after being passed over as leader of the party	29 April 1989	Peter Anderson	Labor
Wallsend	Ken Booth	Labor	Death	17 December 1988	John Mills	Labor
North Shore	Ted Mack	Independent	Resigned	5 November 1988	Robyn Read	Independent
Port Stephens	Bob Martin	Labor	Result voided by the Court of Disputed Returns	5 November 1988	Bob Martin	Labor
Vaucluse	Ray Aston	Liberal	Death	(6 June 1988)*	Michael Yabsley	Liberal
Although the Vaucluse by-election was set for 18 June 1988, Michael Yabsley was declared elected unopposed on the close of nominations on 6 June.; == Forty-eighth Legislative Assembly 1984–1988 ==
By-election	Incumbent	Party	Reason	Date	Winner	Party
Northern Tablelands	Bill McCarthy	Labor	Resignation due to ill health, dying 3 days later	23 May 1987	Ray Chappell	National
Bankstown	Ric Mochalski	Labor	Resigned after being charged with fraud	31 January 1987	Doug Shedden	Labor
Heathcote	Rex Jackson	Labor	Resigned amidst a corruption scandal that ultimately led to his imprisonment	31 January 1987	Ian McManus	Labor
Rockdale	Brian Bannon	Labor	Accepted a government position and created a seat for the Premier	2 August 1986	Barrie Unsworth	Labor
Bass Hill	Neville Wran	Labor	Resigned	2 August 1986	Michael Owen	Liberal
Pittwater	Max Smith	Independent	Resigned	31 May 1986	Jim Longley	Liberal
Vaucluse	Rosemary Foot	Liberal	Resigned	31 May 1986	Ray Aston	Liberal
Kiama	Bill Knott	Labor	Resigned	1 February 1986	Bob Harrison	Labor
Canterbury	Kevin Stewart	Labor	Accepted position as Agent-General in London	1 February 1986	Kevin Moss	Labor
Cabramatta	Eric Bedford	Labor	Resigned	1 February 1986	John Newman	Labor
Gloucester	Leon Punch	National	Resigned	12 October 1985	Wendy Machin	National
Peats	Paul Landa	Labor	Death	2 February 1985	Tony Doyle	Labor
Murray	Tim Fischer	National	Successfully contested the seat of Farrer at the 1984 federal election	2 February 1985	Jim Small	National
== Forty-seventh Legislative Assembly 1981–1984 ==
By-election	Incumbent	Party	Reason	Date	Winner	Party
Maroubra	Bill Haigh	Labor	Resigned after losing cabinet position	22 October 1983	Bob Carr	Labor
Marrickville	Tom Cahill	Labor	Death	22 October 1983	Andrew Refshauge	Labor
Riverstone	Tony Johnson	Labor	Resigned	22 October 1983	Richard Amery	Labor
Kogarah	Bill Crabtree	Labor	Resigned after losing cabinet position	22 October 1983	Brian Langton	Labor
Drummoyne	Michael Maher	Labor	Successfully contested the federal seat of Lowe at the 1982 Lowe by-election	17 April 1982	John Murray	Labor
== Forty-sixth Legislative Assembly 1978–1981 ==
By-election	Incumbent	Party	Reason	Date	Winner	Party
Cessnock	Bob Brown	Labor	Successfully contested the federal seat of Hunter at the 1980 election	21 February 1981	Stan Neilly	Labor
Maitland	Milton Morris	Liberal	Unsuccessfully contested the federal seat of Lyne at the 1980 election	21 February 1981	Peter Toms	Liberal
Oxley	Bruce Cowan	National Country	Successfully contested the federal seat of Lyne at the 1980 election	21 February 1981	Peter King	National Country
Sturt	Tim Fischer	National Country	Resigned to successfully contest the seat of Murray at the 1980 Murray by-election	21 February 1981	John Sullivan	National Country
Bankstown	Nick Kearns	Labor	Death	13 September 1980	Ric Mochalski	Labor
Ku-ring-gai	John Maddison	Liberal	Resigned	13 September 1980	Nick Greiner	Liberal
Murray	Mary Meillon	Liberal	Death	13 September 1980	Tim Fischer	National Country
Castlereagh	Jack Renshaw	Labor	Resigned	23 February 1980	Jim Curran	Labor
== Forty-fifth Legislative Assembly 1976–1978 ==
By-election	Incumbent	Party	Reason	Date	Winner	Party
Earlwood	Eric Willis	Liberal	Resigned	15 July 1978	Ken Gabb	Labor
The Hills	Max Ruddock	Liberal	Resigned	9 October 1976	Fred Caterson	Liberal
== Forty-fourth Legislative Assembly 1973–1976 ==
By-election	Incumbent	Party	Reason	Date	Winner	Party
Orange	Charles Cutler	National Country	Resigned	14 February 1976	Garry West	National Country
Wagga Wagga	Wal Fife	Liberal	Resigned to contest the federal seat of Farrer at the next election	6 December 1975	Joe Schipp	Liberal
Lane Cove	Ken McCaw	Liberal	Resigned	8 February 1975	John Dowd	Liberal
Pittwater	Robert Askin	Liberal	Resigned	8 February 1975	Bruce Webster	Liberal
Coogee	Ross Freeman	Liberal	Result voided by the Court of Disputed Returns	20 July 1974	Michael Cleary	Labor
Goulburn	Ron Brewer	National Country	Unsuccessfully contested the federal seat of Eden-Monaro at the 1974 federal election	20 July 1974	Ron Brewer	National Country
== Forty-third Legislative Assembly 1971–1973 ==
By-election	Incumbent	Party	Reason	Date	Winner	Party
Murray	Joe Lawson	Independent	Death	6 October 1973	Mary Meillon	Liberal
Byron	Stanley Stephens	Country	Resigned	17 February 1973	Jack Boyd	Country
Armidale	Davis Hughes	Country	Accepted position as Agent-General in London	17 February 1973	David Leitch	Country
Hawkesbury	Bernie Deane	Liberal	Resigned	17 February 1973	Kevin Rozzoli	Liberal
Charlestown	Jack Stewart	Labor	Death	18 November 1972.	Richard Face	Labor
Mosman	Pat Morton	Liberal	Resigned	29 July 1972	David Arblaster	Liberal
== Forty-second Legislative Assembly 1968–1971 ==
By-election	Incumbent	Party	Reason	Date	Winner	Party
Georges River	Douglas Cross	Liberal	Death	19 September 1970	Frank Walker	Labor
Murrumbidgee	Al Grassby	Labor	Successfully contested the federal seat of Riverina at the 1969 federal election	14 February 1970	Lin Gordon	Labor
Randwick	Lionel Bowen	Labor	Successfully contested the federal seat of Kingsford Smith at the 1969 federal election	14 February 1970	Laurie Brereton	Labor
Upper Hunter	Frank O'Keefe	Country	Successfully contested the federal seat of Paterson at the 1969 federal election	14 February 1970	Col Fisher	Country
Lake Macquarie	Jim Simpson	Labor	Death	9 April 1969	Merv Hunter	Labor
== Forty-first Legislative Assembly 1965–1968 ==
By-election	Incumbent	Party	Reason	Date	Winner	Party
Bathurst	Gus Kelly	Labor	Death	6 May 1967	Clive Osborne	Country
Oxley	Les Jordan	Liberal	Death	6 November 1965	Bruce Cowan	Country
Bondi	Abe Landa	Labor	Accepted the position of state Agent-General in London	6 November 1965	Syd Einfeld	Labor
== Fortieth Legislative Assembly 1962–1965 ==
By-election	Incumbent	Party	Reason	Date	Winner	Party
Lakemba	Stan Wyatt	Labor	Death	19 September 1964	Vince Durick	Labor
Waratah	Edward Greaves	Labor	Death	8 August 1964	Frank Purdue	Independent
Wollongong-Kembla	Rex Connor	Labor	Successfully contested the federal seat of Cunningham at the 1963 election	29 February 1964	Doug Porter	Labor
Casino	Ian Robinson	Country	Successfully contested the federal seat of Cowper at the 1963 election	29 February 1964	Richmond Manyweathers	Country
== Thirty-ninth Legislative Assembly 1959–1962 ==
By-election	Incumbent	Party	Reason	Date	Winner	Party
Liverpool Plains	Roger Nott	Labor	Accepted an appointment as Administrator of the Northern Territory	25 March 1961	Frank O'Keefe	Country
Paddington-Waverley	William Ferguson	Labor	Death	25 February 1961	Keith Anderson	Labor
Temora	Doug Dickson	Country	Death	8 October 1960	Jim Taylor	Country
Kurri Kurri	George Booth	Labor	Death	8 October 1960	Ken Booth	Labor
Cook's River	Joseph Cahill	Labor	Death	12 December 1959	Tom Cahill	Labor
Lismore	Jack Easter	Country	Result voided by the Court of Disputed Returns	12 September 1959.	Keith Compton	Labor
== Thirty-eighth Legislative Assembly 1956–1959 ==
By-election	Incumbent	Party	Reason	Date	Winner	Party
Wagga Wagga	Eddie Graham	Labor	Death	14 December 1957	Wal Fife	Liberal
Wollondilly	Blake Pelly	Liberal	Resigned	26 October 1957	Tom Lewis	Liberal
Vaucluse	Murray Robson	Liberal	Resigned	24 August 1957	Geoffrey Cox	Liberal
Kahibah	Tom Armstrong	Independent Labor	Death	13 April 1957	Jack Stewart	Labor
Burwood	Leslie Parr	Liberal	Death	16 February 1957	Ben Doig	Liberal
== Thirty-seventh Legislative Assembly 1953–1956 ==
By-election	Incumbent	Party	Reason	Date	Winner	Party
Bulli	Laurie Kelly Sr.	Labor	Death	9 July 1955	Rex Jackson	Labor
Clarence	Cecil Wingfield	Country	Death	26 March 1955	Bill Weiley	Country
Phillip	Tom Shannon	Labor	Death	14 August 1954	Pat Hills	Labor
Leichhardt	Claude Matthews	Labor	Committed suicide	20 March 1954	Reg Coady	Labor
Kahibah	Joshua Arthur	Labor	Resigned after being expelled from the Labor Party, following adverse findings into his conduct by a Royal Commission	31 October 1953	Tom Armstrong	Independent Labor
Waverley	Clarrie Martin	Labor	Death	31 October 1953	William Ferguson	Labor
Dulwich Hill	George Weir	Labor	Appointed to the Industrial Relations Commission of New South Wales	20 June 1953	Cliff Mallam	Labor
== Thirty-sixth Legislative Assembly 1950–1953 ==
By-election	Incumbent	Party	Reason	Date	Winner	Party
Ashfield	Athol Richardson	Liberal	Accepted an appointment as a Judge of the Supreme Court	28 June 1952	Jack Richardson	Labor
Liverpool	James McGirr	Labor	Appointed chair of the Maritime Services Board	24 May 1952	Jack Mannix	Labor
Neutral Bay	Ivan Black	Liberal	Unsuccessfully contested preselection for the federal seat of Warringah at the 1951 election	(21 May 1951)	Ivan Black	Liberal
Burwood	Gordon Jackett	Liberal	Death	2 June 1951	Leslie Parr	Liberal
== Thirty-fifth Legislative Assembly 1947–1950 ==
By-election	Incumbent	Party	Reason	Date	Winner	Party
Concord	Brice Mutton	Liberal	Death	11 February 1950	John Adamson	Liberal
Wollongong-Kembla	Billy Davies	Labor	Successfully contested the seat of Cunningham at the 1949 federal election	11 February 1950	Baden Powell	Labor
Armidale	David Drummond	Country	Successfully contested the seat of New England at the 1949 federal election	11 February 1950	Davis Hughes	Country
Wollondilly	Jeff Bate	Liberal	Successfully contested the seat of Macarthur at the 1949 federal election	(23 January 1950)	Blake Pelly	Liberal
Cessnock	Jack Baddeley	Labor	Accepted an appointment as Chairman of the State Coal Mine Authority	8 October 1949	John Crook	Labor
Redfern	George Noble	Labor	Death	8 October 1949	Kevin Dwyer	Labor
Concord	Bill Carlton	Labor	Death	12 March 1949	Brice Mutton	Liberal
Cobar	Mat Davidson	Labor	Death	12 March 1949	Ernest Wetherell	Labor
Kogarah	William Currey	Labor	Death	17 July 1948	Douglas Cross	Liberal
Coogee	Lou Cunningham	Labor	Death	8 May 1948	Kevin Ellis	Liberal
Hartley	Hamilton Knight	Labor	Accepted an appointment to the Commonwealth Industrial Commission	13 December 1947	Jim Chalmers	Labor
== Thirty-fourth Legislative Assembly 1944–1947 ==
By-election	Incumbent	Party	Reason	Date	Winner	Party
Corowa	Christopher Lethbridge	Liberal	Unsuccessfully contested the federal seat of Riverina at the 1946 federal election	9 November 1946	Ebenezer Kendell	Country
Ashfield	Athol Richardson	Liberal	Unsuccessfully contested the federal seat of Parkes at the 1946 federal election	9 November 1946	Athol Richardson	Liberal
Auburn	Jack Lang	Lang Labor	Successfully contested the federal seat of Reid at the 1946 federal election	9 November 1946	Chris Lang	Lang Labor
Albury	Alexander Mair	Liberal	Unsuccessfully contested a seat in the Australian Senate at the 1946 federal election	9 November 1946	John Hurley	Labor
Goulburn	Jack Tully	Labor	Resigned	1 June 1946	Laurie Tully	Labor
Neutral Bay	Reginald Weaver	Liberal	Death	15 December 1945	Ivan Black	Liberal
Manly	Alfred Reid	Liberal	Death	15 September 1945	Douglas Darby	Liberal
Blacktown	Frank Hill	Labor	Death	18 August 1945	John Freeman	Labor
Ryde	James Shand	Independent Democrat	Death	3 February 1945	Eric Hearnshaw	Liberal
== Thirty-third Legislative Assembly 1941–1944 ==
By-election	Incumbent	Party	Reason	Date	Winner	Party
Auburn	Jack Lang	Lang Labor	Unsuccessfully contested the federal seat of Reid at the 1943 election	2 October 1943	Jack Lang	Lang Labor
Lachlan	Griffith Evans	Country	Death	25 September 1943	John Chanter	Labor
Willoughby	Edward Sanders	UAP	Death	25 September 1943	George Brain	UAP
South Coast	Rupert Beale	Independent	Death	14 November 1942	Jack Beale	Independent
Dubbo	George Wilson	Country	Death	6 June 1942	Clarrie Robertson	Labor
== Thirty-second Legislative Assembly 1938–1941 ==
By-election	Incumbent	Party	Reason	Date	Winner	Party
Barwon	Ben Wade	Country	Unsuccessfully contest the federal seat of Gwydir at the 1940 election	16 November 1940	Roy Heferen	Labor
Ryde	Eric Spooner	UAP	Successfully contested the federal seat of Robertson at the 1940 election	14 September 1940	Arthur Williams	Labor
Croydon	Bertram Stevens	UAP	Unsuccessfully contested the federal seat of Lang at the 1940 election	7 September 1940	David Hunter	UAP
Tamworth	Frank Chaffey	UAP	Death	10 August 1940	Bill Chaffey	UAP
Upper Hunter	Malcolm Brown	Country	Death	7 October 1939	D'Arcy Rose	Country
Waverley	John Waddell	UAP	Death	22 April 1939	Clarrie Martin	Industrial Labor
Hurstville	James Webb	UAP	Death	18 March 1939	Clive Evatt	Industrial Labor
Balmain	John Quirk	Labor	Death	14 January 1939	Mary Quirk	Labor
Wollondilly	Mark Morton	UAP	Death	12 November 1938	Jeff Bate	UAP
Gordon	Harry Turner	UAP	Result voided by Court of Disputed Returns	24 September 1938	Harry Turner	UAP
Coogee	John Dunningham	UAP	Death	25 June 1938	Thomas Mutch	UAP
== Thirty-first Legislative Assembly 1935–1938 ==
By-election	Incumbent	Party	Reason	Date	Winner	Party
Corowa	Richard Ball	Country	Death	11 December 1937	Christopher Lethbridge	Independent
Gordon	Philip Goldfinch	UAP	Resigned (Increased commitment to business interests)	7 August 1937	Harry Turner	UAP
Woollahra	Daniel Levy	UAP	Death	26 June 1937	Harold Mason	Independent UAP
Vaucluse	William Foster	UAP	Death	29 August 1936	Murray Robson	Independent UAP
Gordon	Thomas Bavin	UAP	Accepted an appointment as a Judge of the Supreme Court	(23 November 1935)	Philip Goldfinch	UAP
== Thirtieth Legislative Assembly 1932–1935 ==
By-election	Incumbent	Party	Reason	Date	Winner	Party
Leichhardt	Joe Lamaro	Labor (NSW)	Unsuccessfully contested the federal seat of Watson at the 1934 election	20 October 1934	Claude Matthews	Labor (NSW)
Gloucester	Walter Bennett	UAP	Death	25 August 1934	Charles Bennett	UAP
Hamilton	Hugh Connell	Labor (NSW)	Death	24 February 1934	William Brennan	Labor (NSW)
Annandale	Robert Stuart-Robertson	Labor (NSW)	Death	24 June 1933	Bob Gorman	Labor (NSW)
Bulli	Andrew Lysaght, junior	Labor (NSW)	Death	3 June 1933	John Sweeney	Labor (NSW)
Lismore	William Missingham	Country	Death	11 March 1933	William Frith	Country
Leichhardt	Barney Olde	Labor (NSW)	Death	10 December 1932	Joe Lamaro	Labor (NSW)
== Twenty-ninth Legislative Assembly 1930–1932 ==
By-election	Incumbent	Party	Reason	Date	Winner	Party
Upper Hunter	William Cameron	Nationalist	Death	13 June 1931	Malcolm Brown	Independent Country
Annandale	Robert Stuart-Robertson	Labor (NSW)	Insolvency	25 April 1931	Robert Stuart-Robertson	Labor (NSW)
Clarence	Alfred Pollack	Country	Death	7 March 1931	Alfred Henry	Country
== Twenty-eighth Legislative Assembly 1927–1930 ==
By-election	Incumbent	Party	Reason	Date	Winner	Party
Lane Cove	Bryce Walmsley	Nationalist	Death	26 July 1930	Herbert FitzSimons	Nationalist
Ashfield	Milton Jarvie	Nationalist	Resigned after being implicated in a bribery scandal	5 October 1929	Milton Jarvie	Nationalist
Parramatta	Albert Bruntnell	Nationalist	Death	23 February 1929	Herbert Lloyd	Nationalist
Coogee	Hyman Goldstein	Nationalist	Death – probably murdered by ex-MLA Tom Ley	22 September 1928	John Dunningham	Nationalist
Hamilton	David Murray	Labor	Death	8 September 1928	James Smith	Labor
Wollondilly	George Fuller	Nationalist	Accepted position as Agent-General in London in February 1928	3 March 1928	Mark Morton	Nationalist
== Twenty-seventh Legislative Assembly 1925–1927 == The 25th, 26th and 27th Legislative Assemblies were elected using a form of proportional representation with multi-member seats and a single transferable vote (modified Hare-Clark). Under the provisions of the Parliamentary Elections (Casual Vacancies) Act, casual vacancies were filled by the next unsuccessful candidate on the incumbent member's party list. If an independent member retired, the Clerk of the Assembly determined who would fill the vacancy based on the departing members voting record in questions of confidence. The date listed as the by-election date is the day on which the new member was sworn into the Assembly.
Electorate	Incumbent	Party	Reason for vacancy	Date of appointment	Person appointed	Party
Cumberland	William FitzSimons	Nationalist	Death	(22 September 1926)	James Shand	Nationalist
North Shore	Alick Kay ¶	Independent	Accepted a position on the Metropolitan Meat Board.	(22 September 1926)	Arthur Tonge	Labor
Goulburn	John Perkins	Nationalist	Resigned to successfully contest the federal seat of Eden-Monaro at the 1926 Eden-Monaro by-election.	(21 January 1926)	Henry Bate	Nationalist
St George	Thomas Ley	Nationalist	Resigned to successfully contest the federal seat of Barton at the 1925 election	(30 September 1925)	William Bagnall	Nationalist
Sydney	John Birt	Labor	Death	(24 June 1925)	Patrick Minahan	Labor
¶ Kay had supported the Lang Government in votes of confidence in the Assembly, the Clerk of the Parliament therefore named the first unsuccessful Labor candidate in the North Shore electorate as his replacement. == Twenty-sixth Legislative Assembly 1922–1925 ==
Electorate	Incumbent	Party	Reason for vacancy	Date of appointment	Person appointed	Party
North Shore	Arthur Cocks	Nationalist	Accepted position of Agent-General in London	(24 March 1925)	Alfred Reid	Nationalist
Namoi	Patrick Scully	Labor	Resigned	(20 September 1923)	William Scully	Labor
Sturt	Jabez Wright	Labor	Death	(30 September 1922)	Ted Horsington	Labor
Wammerawa	William Ashford	Independent	Result overturned (Change of member without by-election)	(26 July 1922)	Joseph Clark	Labor
== Twenty-fifth Legislative Assembly 1920–1922 ==
Electorate	Incumbent	Party	Reason for vacancy	Date of appointment	Person appointed	Party
Goulburn ‡	William Millard	Nationalist	Death	(22 November 1921)	John Perkins	Nationalist
Balmain	John Storey	Labor	Death	(18 October 1921)	Tom Keegan	Labor
Newcastle	William Kearsley	Labor	Death	(30 August 1921)	David Murray	Labor
Sturt ¶	Percy Brookfield	Socialist Labor	Murdered while trying to disarm a deranged man at Riverton	(30 August 1921)	Jabez Wright	Labor
Oxley	George Briner	Progressive	Death	(15 December 1920)	Theodore Hill	Progressive
Eastern Suburbs	James Fingleton	Labor	Death	(15 December 1920)	Daniel Dwyer	Labor
Goulburn	Gus James	Nationalist	Accepted an appointment as a Judge of the Supreme Court	(15 December 1920)	William Millard	Nationalist
Murray	George Beeby	Progressive	Accepted a judicial appointment	(15 December 1920)	Matthew Kilpatrick	Progressive
¶ The Speaker had received correspondence nominating two unsuccessful candidates from the 1920 election, Thomas Hynes and John O'Reilly. However, the terms of the Parliamentary Elections (Casual Vacancies) Act stated that a nomination to fill the vacancy had to come from a recognised party leader. Labor leader and Premier John Storey nominated Jabez Wright. ‡Millard had been appointed to replace Gus James and, as there were no further unsuccessful Nationalist candidates, the Parliamentary Elections (Casual Vacancies) Act was amended to allow his replacement by another Nationalist supporter. == Twenty-fourth Legislative Assembly 1917–1920 ==
By-election	Incumbent	Party	Reason	Date	Winner	Party
Paddington	Lawrence O'Hara	Labor	Death	26 July 1919	John Birt	Labor
Paddington	John Osborne	Labor	Accepted as appointment to the Metropolitan Meat Board	24 May 1919	Lawrence O'Hara	Labor
Petersham	John Cohen	Nationalist	Accepted an appointment as a Judge of the District Court	22 March 1919	Sydney Shillington	Nationalist
Monaro	Gus Miller	Labor	Death	23 November 1918	John Bailey	Labor
Upper Hunter	Mac Abbott	Nationalist	Resigned	8 June 1918	William Cameron	Nationalist
Cobar	Charles Fern	Labor	Death	(1 June 1918)	Mat Davidson	Labor
Gloucester	Richard Price	Independent Liberal	Expelled after a Royal Commission found he had made "wanton lies" in an attack on the Lands Minister William Ashford	10 November 1917	Richard Price	Independent Liberal
Murray	Robert Scobie	Nationalist	Death	22 September 1917	Brian Doe	Nationalist
Macquarie	Thomas Thrower	Labor	Death	12 July 1917	Patrick McGirr	Labor
== Twenty-third Legislative Assembly 1913–1917 ==
By-election	Incumbent	Party	Reason	Date	Winner	Party
Sturt	John Cann	Labor	Accepted the position of Commissioner of Railways	3 February 1917	Percy Brookfield	Labor
Bingara	George McDonald	Labor	Resigned from Labor after the 1916 NSW Labor Conference passed a motion of no confidence in the Holman government	10 June 1916	George McDonald	Independent Labor
Parramatta	Tom Moxham	Liberal Reform	Death	12 February 1916	Albert Bruntnell	Liberal Reform
Drummoyne	George Richards	Liberal Reform	Death	22 January 1916	Alexander Graff	Liberal Reform
Willoughby	Edward Larkin	Labor	Died on active service on 25 April 1915	25 September 1915	John Haynes	Independent
Wollondilly	Frank Badgery	Liberal Reform	Death	(2 October 1915)	George Fuller	Liberal Reform
Armidale	George Braund	Liberal Reform	Died on active service	(18 September 1915)	Herbert Lane	Liberal Reform
Clarence	John McFarlane	Liberal Reform	Death	14 August 1915	William Zuill	Independent Liberal
Castlereagh	John Treflé	Labor	Death	20 February 1915	Guy Arkins	Labor
Canterbury	Henry Peters	Labor	Bankrupt	10 October 1914	George Cann	Labor
== Twenty-second Legislative Assembly 1910–1913 ==
By-election	Incumbent	Party	Reason	Date	Winner	Party
Wollondilly	William McCourt	Liberal Reform	Death	19 July 1913	Frank Badgery	Liberal Reform
Blayney	George Beeby	Labor	Resigned from the ministry, parliament and party in protest at the power of the extra-parliamentary Labor Party executive	23 January 1913	George Beeby	Independent
Alexandria	John Dacey	Labor	Death	18 May 1912	Simon Hickey	Labor
Maitland	John Gillies	Independent Liberal	Death	28 October 1911	Charles Edward Nicholson	Liberal Reform
Yass	Niels Nielson	Labor	¶	5 March 1913	Greg McGirr	Labor
Cobar	Donald Macdonell	Labor	¶	(16 December 1911)	Charles Fern	Labor
Cobar	Donald Macdonell	Labor	¶	(7 October 1911)	Donald Macdonell	Labor
Liverpool Plains	John Perry	Liberal Reform	¶	28 October 1911	William Ashford	Labor
Liverpool Plains	Henry Hoyle	Labor	¶	16 August 1911	John Perry	Liberal Reform
Mudgee	Bill Dunn	Labor	¶	16 August 1911	Bill Dunn	Labor
¶ Mudgee Labor MLA Bill Dunn and Liverpool Plains Labor MLA Henry Hoyle resigned from the Labor Party and Parliament on 25 July 1911 in protest at legislation on land ownership introduced by Lands Minister, Niels Nielson. As a result, Labor was left without a majority in the house and rather than face a vote of no confidence, the Ministry and Speaker resigned. This forced the House to be prorogued with the result that Cobar Labor MLA, Donald Macdonell, who was unwell but expected to recover, was automatically expelled for non-attendance during an entire session. By the time of the subsequent by-elections, Labor policy had been reversed and Nielsen had left the ministry. Dunn rejoined the party and successfully re-contested, the Mudgee by-election on 16 August 1911. Hoyle did not re-contest the Liverpool Plains by-election which was won by Liberal candidate, John Perry by three votes on the same day. This result was overturned on appeal and at the second by-election on 28 October, Labor candidate, William Ashford was successful. In Cobar, Macdonell was unopposed when re-elected on 7 October, but died three weeks later. The Labor candidate, Charles Fern was unopposed at the second by-election on 16 December. Denied further ministerial appointment Nielsen resigned from the seat of Yass and Labor candidate Greg McGirr won the resultant by-election on 19 July 1913. == Twenty-first Legislative Assembly 1907–1910 ==
By-election	Incumbent	Party	Reason	Date	Winner	Party
Belmore	Edward O'Sullivan	Labor	Death	21 May 1910	Patrick Minahan	Labor
Darling Harbour	John Norton	Independent	Resigned to unsuccessfully contest a Senate seat at the 1910 election	13 April 1910	John Cochran	Labor
Queanbeyan	Granville Ryrie	Liberal Reform	Resigned to unsuccessfully contest the federal seat of Werriwa at the 1910 election	13 April 1910	John Cusack	Labor
Upper Hunter	William Fleming	Liberal Reform	Resigned to unsuccessfully contest the federal seat of New England at the 1910 election	13 April 1910	William Ashford	Labor
Northumberland	Matthew Charlton	Labor	Resigned to successfully contest the federal seat of Hunter at the 1910 election	(23 March 1910)	William Kearsley	Labor
Sturt	Arthur Griffith	Labor	Resigned from parliament after a dispute with the Speaker	(21 November 1908)	Arthur Griffith	Labor
St George	Joseph Carruthers	Liberal Reform	Resigned	20 May 1908	William Taylor	Liberal Reform
== Twentieth Legislative Assembly 1904–1907 ==
By-election	Incumbent	Party	Reason	Date	Winner	Party
Blayney	Paddy Crick	Progressive	Resigned after being acquitted of corruption charges	12 January 1907	John Withington	Liberal Reform
Castlereagh	Hugh Macdonald	Labor	Death	24 November 1906	John Treflé	Labor
Surry Hills	John Norton	Independent	Challenged William Holman to face a by-election	21 July 1906	Albert Bruntnell	Liberal Reform
Cootamundra	William Holman	Labor	Challenged to a by-election by John Norton	17 July 1906	William Holman	Labor
Queanbeyan	Alan Millard	Liberal Reform	Criminal conviction: Fraud	7 April 1906	Granville Ryrie	Liberal Reform
Ashfield	Frederick Winchcombe	Liberal Reform	Extended absence visiting England	16 August 1905	William Robson	Liberal Reform
Rous	John Coleman	Liberal Reform	Death	11 February 1905	George Hindmarsh	Liberal Reform
== Nineteenth Legislative Assembly 1901–1904 ==
By-election	Incumbent	Party	Reason	Date	Winner	Party
Ryde	Frank Farnell	Independent Liberal	Appointment to Fisheries Board	23 January 1904	Edward Terry	Independent Liberal
Illawarra	Archibald Campbell	Liberal Reform	Death	9 January 1904	Edward Allen	Liberal Reform
Moree	William Webster	Labor	Successful candidate for Gwydir at federal election	12 December 1903	Percy Stirton	Liberal Reform
Armidale	Edmund Lonsdale	Liberal Reform	Successful candidate for New England at federal election	12 December 1903	Sydney Kearney	Liberal Reform
Waratah	Arthur Griffith	Labor	Unsuccessful candidate for Senate at federal election	5 December 1903	Matthew Charlton	Labor
Glen Innes	Francis Wright	Progressive	Death	28 October 1903	Follett Thomas	Liberal Reform
Willoughby	George Howarth	Liberal Reform	Bankruptcy	9 September 1903	Charles Wade	Liberal Reform
Tamworth	Raymond Walsh	Progressive	Bankruptcy	4 April 1903	John Garland	Liberal Reform
Balmain South	Sydney Law	Labor	Refused Caucus solidarity pledge	6 December 1902	Sydney Law	Independent Labor
Inverell	William McIntyre	Progressive	Death	31 May 1902	George Jones	Labor
Sydney-Pyrmont	Samuel Smith	Labor	Appointment to Court of Arbitration	24 May 1902	John McNeill	Labor
Condoublin	Patrick Clara	Labor	Election overturned by the Elections and Qualifications Committee	4 November 1901	Patrick Clara	Labor
== Eighteenth Legislative Assembly 1898–1901 ==
By-election	Incumbent	Party	Reason	Date	Winner	Party
Hume	William Lyne	Protectionist	Successfully contested Hume at 1901 federal election	17 April 1901	Gordon McLaurin	Protectionist
Ashfield	Bernhard Wise	Protectionist	Appointed to Legislative Council	10 November 1900	Frederick Winchcombe	Free Trade
Uralla-Walcha	William Piddington	Protectionist	Death	27 October 1900	Michael MacMahon	Protectionist
Bourke	William Davis	Protectionist	Resignation due to insolvency	(6 September 1900)	William Davis	Protectionist
Canterbury	Sydney Smith	Free Trade	By-election result voided by the Elections and Qualifications Committee	28 July 1900	Thomas Taylor	Independent
Bathurst	Francis Suttor	Protectionist	Appointed to Legislative Council	25 June 1900	William Young	Protectionist
Canterbury	Varney Parkes	Free Trade	Resignation	9 June 1900	Sydney Smith	Free Trade
Uralla-Walcha	William Piddington	Protectionist	Resignation due to insolvency	9 June 1900	William Piddington	Protectionist
Sydney-Phillip	Henry Copeland	Protectionist	Accepted post as Agent-General in London	7 April 1900	Daniel O'Connor	Protectionist
Hastings and Macleay	Edmund Barton	Protectionist	Resigned to take Constitution to London	1 March 1900	Francis Clarke	Protectionist
Boorowa	Kenneth Mackay	Protectionist	Appointed to Legislative Council	30 September 1899	Niels Nielsen	Labor
Northumberland	Richard Stevenson	Protectionist	Death	20 July 1899	John Norton	Ind. Protectionist
Parramatta	William Ferris	Independent Federalist	Election declared void by the Elections and Qualifications Committee	26 October 1898	William Ferris	Protectionist
Hastings and Macleay	Francis Clarke	National Federal	Resigned to give Barton a seat	23 September 1898	Edmund Barton	National Federal
== Seventeenth Legislative Assembly 1895–1898 ==
By-election	Incumbent	Party	Reason	Date	Winner	Party
Sydney-Fitzroy	John McElhone	Independent Free Trade	Death	3 June 1898	John Norton	Protectionist
Narrabri	Charles Collins	Free Trade	Death	3 June 1898	Hugh Ross	Labor
Lachlan	James Carroll	Protectionist	Resignation due to insolvency	(11 September 1896)	James Carroll	Protectionist
Cowra	Denis Donnelly	Protectionist	Death	27 March 1896	Michael Phillips	Protectionist
Waverley	Angus Cameron	Free Trade	Death	18 February 1896	Thomas Jessep	Free Trade
Sydney-Phillip	Dick Meagher	Protectionist	Resigned in disgrace in relation to the pardon of George Dean	17 October 1895	Henry Copeland	Protectionist
Rylstone	John Fitzpatrick	Free Trade	Election result voided by the Elections and Qualifications Committee	14 October 1895	John Fitzpatrick	Free Trade
== Sixteenth Legislative Assembly 1894–1895 ==
By-election	Incumbent	Party	Reason	Date	Winner	Party
Canterbury	Varney Parkes	Free Trade	Resignation due to insolvency	(14 June 1895)	Varney Parkes	Free Trade
Bowral	William McCourt	Free Trade	Resignation due to insolvency	(19 February 1895)	William McCourt	Free Trade
Boorowa	Thomas Slattery	Protectionist	Resigned	15 January 1895	Kenneth Mackay	Protectionist
Willoughby	Joseph Cullen	Free Trade	Resignation due to insolvency	30 November 1894	Edward Clark	Free Trade
Tweed	John Willard	Labor	Not a resident of NSW	29 November 1894	Joseph Kelly	Protectionist
Grenfell	George Greene	Free Trade	Election result overturned by the Elections and Qualifications Committee (no by-election)	(25 October 1894)	Michael Loughnane	Labor
== Fifteenth Legislative Assembly 1891–1894 ==
By-election	Incumbent	Party	Reason	Date	Winner	Party
Macleay	Otho Dangar	Protectionist	Financial difficulty	29 May 1893	Francis Clarke	Protectionist
Central Cumberland	John Nobbs	Free Trade	Financial difficulty	6 May 1893	George McCredie	Free Trade
Murrumbidgee	George Dibbs	Protectionist	Financial difficulty	(6 April 1893)	George Dibbs	Protectionist
South Sydney	James Toohey	Protectionist	Resigned	13 February 1893	William Manning	Protectionist
East Macquarie	James Tonkin	Free Trade	Financial difficulty	13 August 1892	James Tonkin	Free Trade
Hawkesbury	Alexander Bowman	Free Trade	Death	23 July 1892	Sydney Burdekin	Free Trade
Bogan	George Cass	Protectionist	Death	31 May 1892	William A'Beckett	Free Trade
Bourke	Peter Howe	Protectionist	Resigned after conviction for conspiracy to defraud	4 December 1891	Thomas Waddell	Protectionist
Illawarra	John Nicholson	Labor	Previous result voided by the Elections and Qualifications Committee	3 October 1891	John Nicholson	Labor
Illawarra	Andrew Lysaght	Protectionist	Previous result voided by the Elections and Qualifications Committee	3 October 1891	Archibald Campbell	Free Trade
Canterbury	John Wheeler	Free Trade	Election result overturned by the Elections and Qualifications Committee (no by-election)	(2 September 1891)	James Eve	Free Trade
Central Cumberland	Robert Ritchie	Free Trade	Death	29 August 1891	Jacob Garrard	Free Trade
== Fourteenth Legislative Assembly 1889–1891 ==
By-election	Incumbent	Party	Reason	Date	Winner	Party
Wellington	David Ferguson	Protectionist	Death	29 May 1891	Thomas York	Protectionist
East Sydney	John Street	Free Trade	Death	14 April 1891	Walter Bradley	Protectionist
Newcastle	James Fletcher	Protectionist	Death	14 April 1891	William Grahame	Protectionist
West Macquarie	Paddy Crick	Protectionist	Expelled for outrageous behaviour in the chamber	6 December 1890	Paddy Crick	Protectionist
West Sydney	Alfred Lamb	Free Trade	Death	25 October 1890	Adolphus Taylor	Independent
Goulburn	William Teece Jr	Free Trade	Death	16 August 1890	Cecil Teece	Free Trade
Namoi	Tom Dangar	Free Trade	Death	31 July 1890	Charles Collins	Free Trade
Hartley	John Hurley	Free Trade	Financial difficulty	22 July 1890	John Hurley	Free Trade
Balmain	John Hawthorne	Free Trade	Financial Difficulty	(10 July 1890)	John Hawthorne	Free Trade
Hastings and Manning	Charles Roberts	Free Trade	Resigned	5 April 1890	Walter Vivian	Free Trade
Monaro	Harold Stephen	Protectionist	Death	17 December 1889	Gus Miller	Protectionist
Newcastle	William Grahame	Protectionist	Financial Difficulty	12 October 1889	James Curley	Free Trade
Central Cumberland	Frank Farnell	Free Trade	Financial difficulty	(5 October 1889)	Frank Farnell	Free Trade
Central Cumberland	John Linsley	Free Trade	Death	22 July 1889	David Dale	Free Trade
Redfern	John Sutherland	Protectionist	Death	8 July 1889	William Schey	Protectionist
Tamworth	Robert Levien	Protectionist	Sought a new mandate after being involved in a legal scandal	(18 June 1889)	Robert Levien	Protectionist
== Thirteenth Legislative Assembly 1887–1889 ==
By-election	Incumbent	Party	Reason	Date	Winner	Party
Gunnedah	Thomas Goodwin	Protectionist	Resigned	12 September 1888	Edwin Turner	Free Trade
Redfern	James Farnell	Free Trade	Death	8 September 1888	Peter Howe	Protectionist
Central Cumberland	Andrew McCulloch	Free Trade	Financial difficulty	15 May 1888	David Buchanan	Protectionist
Central Cumberland	Varney Parkes	Free Trade	Business commitments	14 March 1888	John Nobbs	Free Trade
Newtown	William Foster	Free Trade	Accepted an appointment as a Judge of the Supreme Court	25 February 1888	Joseph Mitchell	Free Trade
Newtown	Frederick Gibbes	Free Trade	Death	3 February 1888	Joseph Abbott	Free Trade
Paddington	William Trickett	Free Trade	Appointed to Legislative Council	12 January 1888	William Allen	Protectionist
Central Cumberland	Andrew McCulloch	Free Trade	Financial difficulty	28 December 1887	Andrew McCulloch	Free Trade
St Leonards	Henry Parkes	Free Trade	Financial difficulty	(25 October 1887)	Henry Parkes	Free Trade
Wentworth	William MacGregor	Independent Free Trade	Resigned	28 September 1887	Thomas Browne	Protectionist
Mudgee	Adolphus Taylor	Free Trade	Accepted position as Examiner of Patents	11 May 1887	John Haynes	Free Trade

== Twelfth Legislative Assembly 1885–1887 ==
By-election	Incumbent	Reason	Date	Winner
Bourke	Russell Barton; William Sawers	Resigned	21 January 1887	Parliament dissolved before writ returned
Kiama	Harman Tarrant	Resigned	13 January 1887	Angus Cameron
New England	William Proctor	Resigned	10 January 1887	William Proctor
Yass Plains	Louis Heydon	Retired	20 December 1886	Thomas Colls
Wollombi	Lyall Scott	Retired (ill-health)	17 December 1886	Richard Stevenson
Mudgee	John Robertson	Retired (ill-health, financial difficulties and loss of premiership)	(2 July 1886)	William Wall
Gwydir	William Campbell	Resigned	10 June 1886	Thomas Hassall
Young	William Watson	Election result overturned by the Qualifications Committee (no by-election)	(22 December 1885)	James MacKinnon
== Eleventh Legislative Assembly 1882–1885 ==
By-election	Incumbent	Reason	Date	Winner
Central Cumberland	John Lackey	Accepted nomination to the Legislative Council	24 September 1885	Varney Parkes.
Canterbury	Henry Moses	Accepted nomination to the Legislative Council	16 September 1885	William Henson
St Leonards	Bernhardt Holtermann	Death	4 June 1885	Isaac Ives
Argyle	John Gannon	Resigned due to ill health	31 March 1885	Henry Parkes
Carcoar	Andrew Lynch	Death	21 November 1884	Ezekial Baker
Tenterfield	Henry Parkes	Resigned, claiming that he was retiring from politics	(24 November 1884)	Charles Lee
Monaro	Robert Tooth	Resigned	(24 July 1884)	David Ryrie
West Macquarie	Thomas Hellyer	Resigned	2 July 1884	Lewis Lloyd
Northumberland	Atkinson Tighe	Resigned due to ill health	26 May 1884	Richard Luscombe
Gundagai	Bruce Smith	Resigned	22 April 1884	James Watson
Canterbury	William Pigott	Resigned (private work commitments)	19 April 1884	Mark Hammond
East Sydney	George Reid	Found to have a position of profit under the crown	29 February 1884	Sydney Burdekin
Bathurst	Francis Suttor	Found to have a position of profit under the crown	(11 February 1884)	Francis Suttor
Glebe	George Allen	Prolonged voyage to England.	26 August 1883	Michael Chapman
Upper Hunter	John McElhone	Challenged Adolphus Taylor to resign	6 March 1883	John McElhone
Mudgee	Adolphus Taylor	Challenged by John McElhone to resign	6 March 1883	Adolphus Taylor
East Sydney	John McElhone	Elected to two seats	23 January 1883	Henry Copeland
Newtown	Henry Copeland	Ministerial (defeated)	13 January 1883	Joseph Mitchell
== Tenth Legislative Assembly 1880–1882 ==
By-election	Incumbent	Reason	Date	Winner
Gundagai	William Forster	Death	23 November 1882	Bruce Smith
Tumut	James Hoskins	Resigned to take a recuperative sea voyage	17 October 1882	Thomas O'Mara
East Macquarie	Alfred Pechey	Death	11 July 1882	Sydney Smith
Tenterfield	John Dillon	Resigned	6 February 1882	Augustus Fraser
Wentworth	William Brodribb	Appointed to the Legislative Council	23 January 1882	Edward Quin
East Macquarie	Edmund Webb	Appointed to the Legislative Council	19 January 1882	Alfred Pechey
Northumberland	William Turner	Resigned (He was supported by the local coal miners union, however the subscriptions were insufficient to support him in the assembly)	18 January 1882	Thomas Hungerford
Mudgee	Samuel Terry	Appointed to the Legislative Council	(20 January 1882)	John Robertson
Redfern	John Sutherland	Appointed to the Legislative Council	11 January 1882	Francis Wright
Yass Plains	Michael Fitzpatrick	Death	10 January 1882	Louis Heydon
Argyle	Phillip G. Myers	Death	9 December 1881	John Gannon
Newtown	Stephen Brown	Appointed to the Legislative Council	1 December 1881	Joseph Mitchell
Carcoar	Ezekial Baker	Expelled after he had been found to have fraudulently dealt with trust funds	1 December 1881	George Campbell
Queanbeyan	James Thompson	Resigned	21 January 1881	Thomas Rutledge
== Ninth Legislative Assembly 1877–1880 ==
By-election	Incumbent	Reason	Date	Winner
Windsor	Richard Driver	Death	29 July 1880	Henry McQuade
Illawarra	Samuel Gray	Resigned	7 July 1880	Alexander Stuart
Kiama	Samuel Charles	Prolonged voyage to Europe	2 July 1880	Harman Tarrant
Northumberland	Thomas Hungerford	Resigned (attend to personal business matters)	30 April 1880	Ninian Melville
Clarence	Thomas Bawden	Resigned	7 April 1880	Charles Fawcett
Paddington	John Sutherland	Resigned (company won government contract)	20 February 1880	William Hezlet
East Sydney	Alexander Stuart	Accepted position as Agent-General in London	17 December 1879	Arthur Renwick
University of Sydney	William Windeyer	Accepted an appointment as a Judge of the Supreme Court	26 August 1879	Edmund Barton
East Macquarie	William Suttor, Jr.	Resigned	15 August 1879	Edward Combes
Mudgee 2	Richard Rouse	Result overturned by the Qualifications Committee (no by-election)	(7 March 1879)	David Buchanan
Orange	Edward Combes	Found to have an office of profit under the crown	4 March 1879	Andrew Kerr
Mudgee	John Robertson	Appointed to the Legislative Council	6 January 1879	Richard Rouse
East Maitland	Stephen Scholey	Death	5 June 1878	Henry Badgery
East Macquarie	John Robertson	Elected to two seats,	1 February 1878	Edmund Webb
== Eighth Legislative Assembly 1874–1877 ==
By-election	Incumbent	Reason	Date	Winner
Northumberland	Charles Stevens	Financial difficulties	20 July 1877	William Turner
Orange	Harris Nelson	Resigned	(22 February 1877)	Edward Combes
Williams	William Watson	Resigned	February 1877	William Johnston
Mudgee	Stephen Goold	Death	5 October 1876	Richard Rouse
University of Sydney		New seat	8 September 1876	William Windeyer
Carcoar	Solomon Meyer	Resigned due to financial difficulties	(21 June 1876)	Andrew Lynch
Liverpool Plains	Hanley Bennett	Financial difficulties	5 June 1876	Hanley Bennett
Hartley	Thomas Browne	Found to have held a position of profit under the crown	21 April 1876	John Hurley
Parramatta	Hugh Taylor	Resigned as he may have had a position of profit under the crown	20 April 1876	Hugh Taylor
Murrumbidgee	William Forster	Accepted the position of Agent-General in London	(6 March 1876)	Joseph Leary
Upper Hunter	Thomas Hungerford	By-election result voided by Qualifications Committee	5 August 1875	John McElhone
Central Cumberland	Joseph Wearne	Financial difficulties	28 June 1875	William Long
Upper Hunter	Francis White	Death	7 June 1875	Thomas Hungerford
Paterson	William Arnold	Death	18 March 1875	Herbert Brown
== Seventh Legislative Assembly 1872–1874 ==
By-election	Incumbent	Reason	Date	Winner
West Maitland	Benjamin Lee	Financial difficulties	4 August 1874	Lewis Levy
East Sydney	James Neale	Resigned	15 July 1874	Charles Moore
East Macquarie	James Martin	Accepted appointment as Chief Justice	1 December 1873	Walter Cooper
Mudgee	Joseph Innes	Appointed to the Legislative Council	8 September 1873	Joseph O'Connor
Hume	James McLaurin	Resigned	31 March 1873	Thomas Robertson
Murray	Patrick Jennings	Resigned	5 August 1872	William Hay
East Sydney	Saul Samuel	Appointed to the Legislative Council	12 June 1872	George Oakes
Parramatta	Hugh Taylor	Disqualified himself at the declaration of the poll as he had a position of profit under the crown	(22 May 1872)	Hugh Taylor
== Sixth Legislative Assembly 1869–1872 ==
By-election	Incumbent	Reason	Date	Winner
Mudgee	Henry Stephen	Resigned	2 January 1872	Henry Parkes
New England	Charles Weaver	Resigned	28 August 1871	Samuel Terry
Shoalhaven	Thomas Garrett	Accepted the position of Police Magistrate at Berrima	(28 August 1871)	James Warden
Liverpool Plains	Charles Cowper	Accepted the position of Agent-General in London	9 January 1871	Lewis Levy
Kiama	Henry Parkes	Financial difficulties	(12 January 1871)	John Stewart
Canterbury	Montagu Stephen	Prolonged visit to England	6 January 1871	John Lucas
Goldfields South	Ezekiel Baker	Accepted appointment to the Goldfields Royal Commission	12 December 1870	Ezekiel Baker
Monaro	Daniel Egan	Death	17 November 1870	James Hart
Kiama	Henry Parkes	Financial difficulties	3 November 1870	Henry Parkes
Braidwood	Michael Kelly	Result voided due to electoral irregularities	17 October 1870	Edward Greville
Hastings	Horace Dean	Election overturned as not a British subject (no by-election)	(4 July 1870)	Robert Smith
Wollombi	Joseph Eckford	Financial difficulties	19 September 1870	Joseph Eckford
Hastings	Horace Dean	Found to have held an office of profit under the crown	4 July 1870	Horace Dean
Goldfields South	Ezekiel Baker	Resigned	(11 July 1870)	Ezekiel Baker
Goldfields North	Robert Wisdom	Elected to two seats	18 April 1870	Robert Forster
West Sydney	John Robertson	Financial difficulties	2 March 1870	John Robertson
East Sydney	Henry Parkes	Elected to two seats	23 February 1870	Bowie Wilson
== Fifth Legislative Assembly 1864–1869 ==
By-election	Incumbent	Reason	Date	Winner
Braidwood	Joshua Josephson	Accepted an appointment as a Judge of the District Court	(25 September 1869)	Michael Kelly
Goldfields West	George Thornton	Prolonged trip to England	15 February 1869	Walter Church
Central Cumberland	Allan Macpherson	Cause of resignation is unknown	17 December 1868	Samuel Lyons
West Sydney	Samuel Joseph	Prolonged trip to England	15 December 1868	William Campbell
Canterbury	James Pemell	Cause of resignation is unknown	(19 September 1868)	Richard Hill
Goldfields North	George Pickering	Cause of resignation is unknown	6 July 1868	James Hoskins
Upper Hunter	James White	Prolonged trip to England	6 June 1868	Archibald Bell
East Macquarie	David Buchanan	Traveled to England to study for the bar	26 August 1867	John Suttor
Orange	William Forlonge	Financial Difficulty	1 July 1867	George McKay
Central Cumberland	John Hay	Appointed to the Legislative Council	27 June 1867	John Lackey
East Sydney	Charles Cowper	Financial Difficulty	20 March 1867	Marshall Burdekin
Goldfields West	Stephen Donnelly	Cause of resignation is unknown	26 February 1867	George Thornton
Bathurst	James Kemp	Cause of resignation is unknown	(24 December 1866)	William Suttor
East Sydney	John Caldwell	Financial Difficulty	(24 September 1866)	Robert Stewart
Illawarra	Patrick Osborne	Prolonged trip to England	6 September 1866	John Stewart
Clarence	John Laycock	Cause of resignation is unknown	27 August 1866	John Robertson
Tumut	Charles Cowper Jr.	Absent from parliament without leave	20 August 1866	Edward Brown
Williams 2	Frederick Manton	Financial Difficulty	19 April 1866	John Nowlan
Williams 1	Marshall Burdekin	Ministerial by-election	22 January 1866	Frederick Manton
West Sydney	John Robertson	Ministerial by-election	17 January 1866	William Windeyer
Yass Plains	Peter Faucett	Accepted an appointment as a Judge of the Supreme Court	(6 November 1865)	Robert Isaacs
West Sydney 3	John Robertson	Financial Difficulty	(20 October 1865)	John Robertson
West Sydney 2	John Darvall	Retired to England	7 July 1865	Geoffrey Eagar
Gwydir	Tom Dangar	Position of profit under the crown	29 June 1865	Tom Dangar
Monaro	James Martin	Elected to two seats	(10 April 1865)	William Grahame
Canterbury	John Lucas	Elected to two seats	24 February 1865	James Pemell
== Fourth Legislative Assembly 1860–1864 ==
By-election	Incumbent	Reason	Date	Winner
East Macquarie	William Suttor	Resigned	6 October 1864	David Buchanan
Kiama	Samuel Gray	Resigned	29 April 1864	Henry Parkes
Braidwood	Merion Moriarty	Death	3 February 1864	Henry Milford
Tumut	Charles Cowper, Jr.	Resigned to oppose Martin in Ministerial by-election	16 November 1863	James Martin
Orange	James Martin	Ministerial – Premier (defeated)	4 November 1863	Charles Cowper, Jr.
Clarence	Clark Irving	Absent for entire session without leave	23 July 1863	Clark Irving
East Maitland	James Dickson	Death	18 June 1863	John Darvall
Central Cumberland	James Atkinson	Resigned (Ill health)	6 June 1863	Allan Macpherson
Goldfields North	James Hoskins	Accepted position as overseer of northern roads	7 April 1863	James Buchanan
Liverpool Plains	Alexander Dick	Resigned	29 January 1863	Marshall Burdekin
West Sydney	William Windeyer	Resigned (Ill health after being shipwrecked)	8 January 1863	Geoffrey Eagar
Northumberland	Thomas Lewis	Financial difficulty	23 December 1862	Atkinson Tighe
Argyle	Terence Murray	Appointed to the Legislative Council	(30 October 1862)	Samuel Emmanuel
Carcoar	William Watt	Resigned	(16 October 1862)	William Dalley
Morpeth	David Buchanan	Financial difficulty	18 September 1862	Edward Close
Orange	John Peisley	Resigned	28 June 1862	James Martin
New England	George Markham	Resigned	2 April 1862	Robert Forster
Wellington	Silvanus Daniel	Resigned	(26 February 1862)	Saul Samuel
Shoalhaven	John Garrett	Resigned	(7 January 1862)	John Robertson
Tenterfield	Robert Meston	Resigned	3 December 1861	Hugh Gordon
Yass Plains	Henry O'Brien	Resigned (Ill health)	(15 August 1861)	Peter Faucett
Camden	John Douglas	Resigned to move to Queensland	(15 August 1861)	David Bell
Hunter	Isidore Blake	Accepted an appointment as a Judge of the District Court	5 August 1861	John Burns
Lower Hunter	Alexander Scott	Appointed to the Legislative Council	19 July 1861	Richard Sadleir
Newtown	Alexander McArthur	Appointed to the Legislative Council	12 July 1861	Thomas Holt
Patrick's Plains	William Lesley	Resigned	(4 July 1861)	Joseph Harpur
Goulburn	Charles Walsh	Resigned as he had achieved his aims of land and Legislative Council reform	13 June 1861	Maurice Alexander
East Sydney	Henry Parkes	Accepted position as immigration promoter in England	29 May 1861	William Forster
Upper Hunter	John Robertson	Appointed to the Legislative Council	15 April 1861	Thomas Dangar
Parramatta	James Byrnes	Resigned (unhappy that he was the second member elected for the seat)	10 April 1861	Arthur Holroyd
== Third Legislative Assembly 1859–1860 ==
By-election	Incumbent	Reason	Date	Winner
Tumut	Daniel Deniehy	Elected to two seats and previous by-election voided due to voting irregularities	(1 November 1860)	Charles Cowper, Jr.
Braidwood	Frederick Cooper	Resigned	10 August 1860	Merion Moriarty
Morpeth	Edward Close	Resigned	7 August 1860	Samuel Cohen
Wellington	Nicolas Hyeronimus	Death	26 July 1860	Silvanus Daniel
Wollombi	William Cape	Resigned	17 May 1860	Joseph Eckford
Tumut	George Lang	Resigned (political ennui)	10 May 1860	Daniel Deniehy (Note: Daniel Deniehy was declared elected at the by-election in May 1860, however he was also elected at the East Macquarie by-election held on the same day and his election to Tumut was subsequently declared void by the Elections and Qualifications Committee. He took his seat as the member for East Macquarie and doesn't appear in the records kept by the Legislative assembly as a member for Tumut.)
East Macquarie	Thomas Hawkins	Resigned	10 May 1860	Daniel Deniehy
St Leonards	Edward Sayers	Resigned	2 May 1860	James Farnell
Hunter	Richard Jones	Resigned	(23 April 1860)	Isidore Blake
Liverpool Plains	Andrew Loder	Resigned after the defeat of the Foster Government	10 April 1860	Charles Kemp
Windsor	William Dalley	Prolonged visit to Europe resulting by-election	12 March 1860	William Walker
Williams	Stephen Dark	Resigned	16 February 1860	Alexander Campbell
Canterbury	Edward Flood	Resigned	4 February 1860	John Lucas
East Sydney	Charles Cowper	Was nominated and elected without his consent at previous by-election	20 January 1860	Peter Faucett
West Macquarie	John McPhillamy	Resigned	(21 December 1859)	Henry Mort
Mudgee	Lyttleton Bayley	Resigned after losing ministerial post	19 December 1859	Samuel Terry
East Sydney	Charles Cowper	Resigned (Ill health)	10 November 1859	Charles Cowper
Illawarra	John Hargrave	Appointed to Legislative Council	28 October 1859	Samuel Gordon
East Macquarie	William Suttor	Resigned	6 October 1859	Thomas Hawkins
Yass Plains	Thomas Laidlaw	Found to have a position of profit under the crown	(15 September 1859)	Thomas Laidlaw
East Maitland	Joseph Chambers	Appointed Crown Prosecutor	15 September 1859	James Dickson
== Second Legislative Assembly 1858–1859 ==
By-election	Incumbent	Reason	Date	Winner
East Camden	Robert Owen	Accepted an appointment as a Judge of the District Court	21 March 1859	John Hargrave
New England and Macleay	Abram Moriarty	Resigned	(26 November 1858)	James Hart
Cumberland (North Riding)	Henry Parkes	Financial difficulties	(13 September 1858)	John Plunkett
== First Legislative Assembly 1856–1858 ==
By-election	Incumbent	Reason	Date	Winner
Moreton, Wide Bay, Burnett and Maranoa	Gordon Sandeman	Resigned	(19 November 1857)	Patrick Leslie
Cumberland (North Riding)	John Darvall	Resigned	11 December 1857	Thomas Smith
Northumberland Boroughs	George Nichols	Death	(3 November 1857)	James Dickson
Cumberland (South Riding)	William Manning	Resigned	12 June 1857	James Byrnes
Argyle	John Plunkett	Appointed to the Legislative Council	(13 February 1857)	Daniel Deniehy
Sydney City	Henry Parkes	Financial difficulties	29 December 1856	William Dalley
Cumberland (South Riding)	Ryan Brenan	Result voided by the Elections and Qualifications Committee	(4 November 1856)	Stuart Donaldson
Sydney Hamlets	Stuart Donaldson	Ministerial (defeated)	10 October 1856	John Campbell
Cumberland (South Riding)	Elias Weekes	Elected for two seats	21 August 1856	Ryan Brenan
Northumberland Boroughs	Bourn Russell	Result overturned by Qualifications Committee (no by-election)	(5 August 1856)	Elias Weekes
Bathurst County	John Plunkett	Elected for two seats	19 June 1856	William Suttor
Western Division of Camden	James Macarthur	Believed poll to be unconstitutional	(16 June 1856)	James Macarthur

== Causes ==
A by-election may occur whenever there is a vacancy in the Legislative Assembly. Vacancies can occur for reasons including:

- Death
- Voluntary resignation for any reason; historically these reasons have included:
  - Retirement
  - Health issues
  - Family or business commitments
  - Prolonged absence from the state—this occurred most commonly in the period when travel to Europe required a long sea voyage
  - Loss of cabinet position, e.g., the resignation of Reba Meagher in 2008 after she lost the position of Minister for Health
  - Matters of principle, e.g., Billy Dunn resigned from the seat of Mudgee in 1911 after disagreeing with his party's land ownership legislation.
  - Resignation or expulsion from a political party
  - To create a vacancy for a party leader who did not have a seat. This occurred most recently in 1986 when Rockdale MLA Brian Bannon resigned to enable newly elected party leader Barrie Unsworth to transfer from the Legislative Council to the Legislative Assembly.
  - Public disgrace
  - As a result of an inducement from an opposing party and thus create the potential for that party to increase its representation e.g. Independent MLA Alick Kay accepted an appointment to the Metropolitan Meat Board in 1927. Under a controversial use of the Legislative Assembly (Casual Vacancies) Act, he was replaced by Labor's Arthur Tonge; this gave the government of Jack Lang a secure majority in the house.
- Constitutional ineligibility to be a Member of the Legislative Assembly, including:
  - Election result voided or overturned on appeal—appeals were initially made to the Qualifications Committee of the Assembly but since 1928 they have been determined by the Court of Disputed Returns
  - Election to two seats—in which case the member was required to resign from one seat
  - Appointment or election to the Legislative Council This occurred most commonly prior to 1936, when members of the council were appointed for life by the governor
  - Election to another parliament, particularly federal parliament—members are required to resign prior to the issuing of the writs for the other parliament's election
  - Having or accepting a position of profit under the crown
  - Not being a citizen of Australia
  - Non-residence in New South Wales for more than 6 months prior to election
  - Becomes of "unsound mind"
  - Insolvency
  - Conviction for a major criminal offence or, since 2007, having faced trial on a charge of sexual abuse of a minor
  - Absence from the house for an entire session without leave
  - Expulsion from the house for infamous conduct
  - Ministerial appointment Until 1904, members appointed to a ministerial position were required to face a by-election. These were generally uncontested. The political instability of New South Wales in the Nineteenth century caused a very large number of these by-elections and for convenience they have not been listed unless the minister was defeated.

It is now a convention that a by-election is not held if a vacancy occurs within 3–4 months of an expected dissolution of the parliament.
