= 1863 Goldfields North colonial by-election =

By-election in New South Wales, Australia

A by-election was held for the New South Wales Legislative Assembly electorate of Goldfields North on 7 April 1863 because of the resignation of James Hoskins. Hoskins had been supported by a voluntary contribution from miners however he resigned for financial reasons, taking the job of overseer of northern roads.

== Dates ==
Date	Event
17 February 1863	James Hoskins resigned.
2 March 1863	Writ of election issued by the Speaker of the Legislative Assembly.
323 March 1863	Nominations
7 April 1863	Polling day
18 April 1863	Return of writ

== Result ==
1863 Goldfields North by-election Tuesday 7 April
Candidate	Votes	%
James Buchanan (elected)	319	59.4
James Macnamara	218	40.6
Total formal votes	537	100.0
Informal votes	0	0.0
Turnout	537	44.8

== See also ==
- Electoral results for the district of Goldfields North
- List of New South Wales state by-elections
