= 1860 Wellington colonial by-election =

By-election in New South Wales, Australia

A by-election was held for the New South Wales Legislative Assembly electorate of Wellington on 26 July 1860 because Nicolas Hyeronimus died.

== Dates ==
Date	Event
27 June 1860	Nicolas Hyeronimus died.
29 June 1860	Writ of election issued by the Speaker of the Legislative Assembly.
19 July May 1860	Nominations at Wellington.
26 July 1860	Polling day between 9 am and 4 pm.
2 August 1860	Return of writ

== Polling places ==
- Burrandong
- Molong
- Stoney Creek (Note: 22 kilometres (14 mi) north-east of the Mudgee on the road to Cooyal and Wollar.)
- Tambaroora
- Wellington

== Result ==
1860 Wellington by-election Thursday 26 July
Candidate	Votes	%
Silvanus Daniel (elected)	165	78.2
James Garland	46	21.8
Total formal votes	548	100.0
Informal votes	0	0.0
Turnout	548	58.0

== See also ==
- Electoral results for the district of Wellington
- List of New South Wales state by-elections
