= 1859 Yass Plains colonial by-election =

By-election in New South Wales, Australia

A by-election was held for the New South Wales Legislative Assembly electorate of Yass Plains on 15 September 1859 because Thomas Laidlaw resigned as he realised his role as deputy postmaster at Yass, on a salary of £20 a year, was an office of profit under the crown.

== Dates ==
Date	Event
16 June 1859	Thomas Laidlaw elected unopposed.
30 August 1859	Parliament opened
2 September 1859	Thomas Laidlaw resigned.
3 September 1859	Writ of election issued by the Speaker of the Legislative Assembly.
15 September 1859	Nominations at Yass
20 September 1859	Polling day
27 September 1859	Return of writ

== Result ==
1859 Yass Plains by-election Thursday 15 September
Candidate	Votes	%
Thomas Laidlaw (elected)	unopposed	

== See also ==
- Electoral results for the district of Yass Plains
- List of New South Wales state by-elections
