= 1857 Argyle colonial by-election =

By-election in New South Wales, Australia

A by-election was to be held for the New South Wales Legislative Assembly electorate of Argyle on 17 February 1857 because the seat of John Plunkett was declared vacant due to his appointment as President of the Legislative Council.

== Dates ==
Date	Event
28 January 1857	John Plunkett's seat declared vacant.
28 January 1857	Writ of election issued by the Speaker of the Legislative Assembly.
13 February 1857	Nominations
17 February 1857	Polling day
24 February 1857	Return of writ

== Results ==
1857 Argyle by-election Tuesday 17 February
Candidate	Votes	%
Daniel Deniehy (elected)	unopposed	

== See also ==
- Electoral results for the district of Argyle
- List of New South Wales state by-elections
