= 1862 Wellington colonial by-election =

By-election in New South Wales, Australia

A by-election was held for the New South Wales Legislative Assembly electorate of Wellington on 26 February 1861 because of the resignation of Silvanus Daniel, who was then appointed a Commissioner of Crown Lands, a position he had held prior to entering parliament.

== Dates ==
| Date | Event |
|---|---|
| 3 February 1861 | Silvanus Daniel resigned. |
| 5 February | Writ of election issued by the Speaker of the Legislative Assembly. |
| 26 February 1861 | Nominations |
| 5 March 1861 | Polling day |
| 26 March 1861 | Return of writ |

== Result ==
1861 Wellington by-election Wednesday 26 February
| Candidate | Votes | % |
|---|---|---|
| Saul Samuel (elected) | unopposed | |

== See also ==
- Electoral results for the district of Wellington
- List of New South Wales state by-elections
