= 1862 Northumberland colonial by-election =

By-election in New South Wales, Australia

A by-election was held for the New South Wales Legislative Assembly electorate of Northumberland on 23 December 1862 because Thomas Lewis resigned, as he was unable to afford to attend to the Legislative Assembly at a time when members were not paid. He accepted an appointment as an inspector of coal fields in February 1863.

== Dates ==
| Date | Event |
|---|---|
| 11 December 1862 | Thomas Lewis resigned. |
| 12 December 1862 | Writ of election issued by the Speaker of the Legislative Assembly. |
| 22 December 1862 | Nominations at Newcastle. |
| 23 December 1862 | Polling day between 9 am and 4 pm. |
| 29 December 1862 | Return of writ |

== Polling places ==
- Newcastle
- Burwood
- Hexham

== Result ==
1862 Northumberland by-election Tuesday 23 December
| Candidate | Votes | % |
|---|---|---|
| Atkinson Tighe (elected) | 339 | 50.6 |
| William Brookes | 331 | 49.4 |
| Total formal votes | 670 | 100.0 |
| Informal votes | 0 | 0.0 |
| Turnout | 670 | 44.4 |

== See also ==
- Electoral results for the district of Northumberland
- List of New South Wales state by-elections
