= 1862 Orange colonial by-election =

By-election in New South Wales, Australia

A by-election was held for the New South Wales Legislative Assembly electorate of Orange on 28 June 1862 because John Peisley resigned. Piesley had rarely attended the Legislative Assembly and a public meeting in Orange called on him to attend to his parliamentary duties or resign. Piesley's letter of resignation stated that he had been unable to attend to his parliamentary duties due to the pressure of business.

== Dates ==
Date	Event
10 June 1862	John Peisley resigned.
12 June 1862	Writ of election issued by the Speaker of the Legislative Assembly.
25 June 1862	Nominations
28 June 1862	Polling day
5 July 1862	Return of writ

== Results ==
1862 Orange by-election Saturday 28 June
Candidate	Votes	%
James Martin (elected)	177	67.6
William Forlonge	85	32.4
Total formal votes	262	100.0
Informal votes	0	0.0
Turnout	262	35.9

== See also ==
- Electoral results for the district of Orange
- List of New South Wales state by-elections
