= 1860 New South Wales colonial election =

Colonial election for New South Wales, Australia in December 1860

- 6 December 1860 – 24 December 1860

All 72 seats in the New South Wales Legislative Assembly 37 Assembly seats were needed for a majority
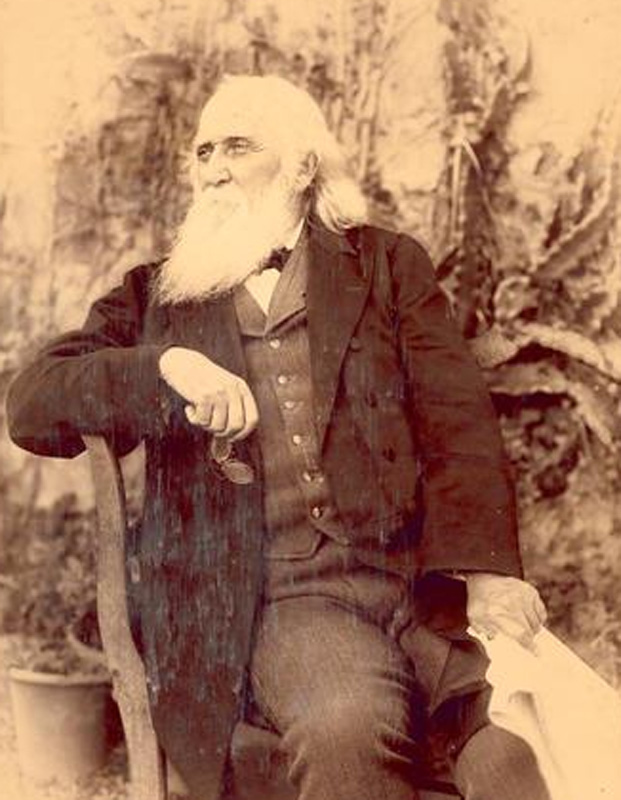

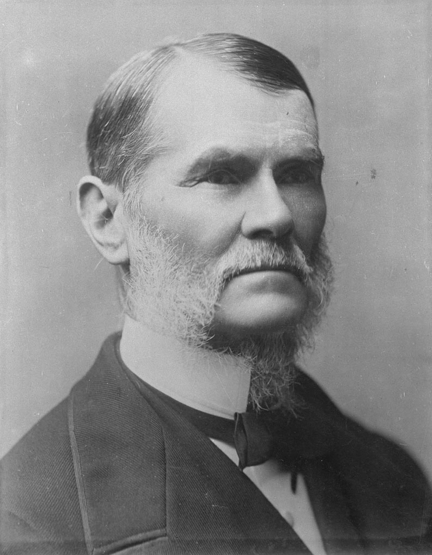
	First party	Second party
Leader	John Robertson	William Forster
Party	Government	Opposition
Leader's seat	Upper Hunter	Queanbeyan
Seats won	38	11
- Results of the election, showing winners in each seat. Seats without member charts indicate the electorate returned one member.
Premier before election
John Robertson
Elected Premier
Charles Cowper

The 1860 New South Wales colonial election was held between 6 December and 24 December 1860. This election was for all of the 72 seats in the New South Wales Legislative Assembly and it was conducted in 52 single-member constituencies, six 2-member constituencies and two 4-member constituencies, all with a first past the post system. Suffrage was limited to adult white males. This was the first election after the separation of Queensland in December 1859.

The previous parliament of New South Wales was dissolved on 10 November 1860 by the Governor, Sir William Denison, on the advice of the Premier, John Robertson.

While there was no recognisable party structure at this election, the Sydney Morning Herald identified three main factions in the Legislative Assembly. 38 members were considered to support the government, 11 were in opposition, and a further 23 that supported Henry Parkes or were uncommitted to supporting the government.

Although Robertson won the election, he relinquished the premiership to Charles Cowper to concentrate on passing land reform bills as Secretary of Lands.

== Key dates ==
Date	Event
10 November 1860	The Legislative Assembly was dissolved, and writs were issued by the Governor to proceed with an election.
5 December to 21 December 1860	Nominations for candidates for the election closed.
6 December to 24 December 1860	Polling days.
10 January 1861	Opening of new Parliament.

== Results ==
New South Wales colonial election, 6 December 1860 – 24 December 1860 Legislative Assembly << 1859–1864–65 >>
Enrolled voters	91,410				
Votes cast	46,308		Turnout	42.91 (Note: There were 17 uncontested districts and turnout is based on the roll of 66,581 for the contested districts.)	–9.63
Informal votes	48		Informal	0.17	+0.09
Summary of votes by party
Party	Primary votes	%	Swing	Seats	Change
Total	46,308			72	

== See also ==
- Members of the New South Wales Legislative Assembly, 1860–1864
- Candidates of the 1860 New South Wales colonial election
