= 1885 St Leonards colonial by-election =

By-election in New South Wales, Australia

A by-election for the seat of St Leonards in the New South Wales Legislative Assembly was held on 4 June 1885 because of the death of Bernhardt Holtermann.

== Dates ==
Date	Event
29 April 1885	Bernhardt Holtermann died.
14 May 1885	Writ of election issued by the Speaker of the Legislative Assembly.
1 June 1885	Day of nomination
4 June 1885	Polling day
13 June 1885	Return of writ

== Candidates ==
- John Hurley was a mining speculator who had previously been a member of the Legislative Assembly and who had returned from Queensland, having been a member of the Queensland Legislative Assembly until July 1884.
- Isaac Ives was a former Mayor of Victoria, which covered the suburb of North Sydney.
- Michael McMahon was the Mayor of Victoria and a wealthy businessman, with a mansion on McMahons Point which was named after him.

== Results ==
1885 St Leonards by-election Thursday 4 June
Candidate	Votes	%
Isaac Ives (elected)	1,625	61.6
Michael McMahon	805	30.5
John Hurley	207	7.9
Total formal votes	2,637	98.8
Informal votes	33	1.2
Turnout	2,670	62.6

== See also ==
- Electoral results for the district of St Leonards
- List of New South Wales state by-elections
