= 1860 Morpeth colonial by-election =

By-election in New South Wales, Australia

A by-election was held for the New South Wales Legislative Assembly electorate of Morpeth on 7 August 1860 because Edward Close resigned. Close later stated that he resigned because it had been a lengthy session of parliament, marked by a contest for power between Charles Cowper, William Forster and John Robertson in which nothing was done.

== Dates ==
Date	Event
12 July 1860	Edward Close resigned.
17 July 1860	Writ of election issued by the Speaker of the Legislative Assembly.
31 July 1860	Nominations at Morpeth.
7 August 1860	Polling day.
17 August 1860	Return of writ

== Polling places ==
- Hinton
- Largs
- Morpeth

== Result ==
1860 Morpeth by-election Tuesday 7 August
Candidate	Votes	%
Samuel Cohen (elected)	312	59.8
David Buchanan	210	40.2
Total formal votes	522	100.0
Informal votes	0	0.0
Turnout	522	64.5

== See also ==
- Electoral results for the district of Morpeth
- List of New South Wales state by-elections
