= 1860 Braidwood colonial by-election =

By-election in New South Wales, Australia

A by-election was held for the New South Wales Legislative Assembly electorate of Braidwood on 10 August 1860 because of the resignation of Frederick Cooper.

== Dates ==
Date	Event
14 July 1860	Frederick Cooper resigned.
18 July 1860	Writ of election issued by the Speaker of the Legislative Assembly and close of electoral rolls.
1 August 1860	Nominations
10 August 1860	Polling day
20 August 1860	Return of writ

== Results ==
1860 Braidwood by-election Friday 10 August
Candidate	Votes	%
Merion Moriarty (elected)	184	52.9
James Larmer	159	45.7
Stephen Richardson	3	45.7
Henry Milford	1	0.3
Joseph Taylor	1	0.3
Total formal votes	348	100.0
Informal votes	0	0.0
Turnout	348	26.7

== See also ==
- Electoral results for the district of Braidwood
- List of New South Wales state by-elections
