= 1860 Canterbury colonial by-election =

By-election in New South Wales, Australia

A by-election for the seat of Canterbury in the New South Wales Legislative Assembly was held on 4 February 1860 because of the resignation of Edward Flood.

== Dates ==
Date	Event
16 January 1860	Writ of election issued by the Speaker of the Legislative Assembly and close of electoral rolls.
31 January 1860	Nominations
4 February 1860	Polling day
7 February 1860	Return of writ

== Results ==
1860 Canterbury by-election Saturday 4 February
Candidate	Votes	%
John Lucas (elected)	713	70.7
William Sherwin	249	24.7
Maurice Reynolds	46	4.6
Total formal votes	1,008	100.0
Informal votes	0	0.0
Turnout	1,008	33.3

== See also ==
- Electoral results for the district of Canterbury
- List of New South Wales state by-elections
