= 1859 Illawarra colonial by-election =

By-election in New South Wales, Australia

A by-election was held for the New South Wales Legislative Assembly electorate of Illawarra on 28 October 1859 because John Hargrave resigned to accept an appointment to the Legislative Council.

== Dates ==
Date	Event
11 October 1859	John Hargrave resigned.
13 October 1859	Writ of election issued by the Speaker of the Legislative Assembly.
25 October 1859	Nominations
28 October 1859	Polling day
1 November 1859	Return of writ

== Result ==
1859 Illawarra by-election Monday 19 December
Candidate	Votes	%
Samuel Gordon (elected)	389	51.3
Robert Haworth	370	48.7
Total formal votes	759	100.0
Informal votes	0	0.0
Turnout	759	57.7

== See also ==
- Electoral results for the district of Illawarra
- List of New South Wales state by-elections
