= 1864 East Macquarie colonial by-election =

By-election in New South Wales, Australia

A by-election was held for the New South Wales Legislative Assembly electorate of East Macquarie on 6 October 1864 because of the resignation of William Suttor Sr.

== Dates ==
| Date | Event |
|---|---|
| 11 September 1864 | William Suttor Sr. resigned. |
| 19 September 1864 | Writ of election issued by the Speaker of the Legislative Assembly. |
| 3 October 1864 | Nominations |
| 6 October 1864 | Polling day |
| 15 October 1864 | Return of writ |

== Result ==
1864 East Macquarie by-election Thursday 6 October
| Candidate | Votes | % |
|---|---|---|
| David Buchanan (elected) | 375 | 52.2 |
| Joseph West | 343 | 48.8 |
| Total formal votes | 718 | 100.0 |
| Informal votes | 0 | 0.0 |
| Turnout | 718 | 32.0 |

== See also ==
- Electoral results for the district of East Macquarie
- List of New South Wales state by-elections
