= 1860 Wollombi colonial by-election =

By-election in New South Wales, Australia

A by-election was held for the New South Wales Legislative Assembly electorate of Wollombi on 2 May 1860 because William Cape resigned to take his children to England to complete their education.

== Dates ==
Date	Event
13 April 1860	William Cape resigned.
17 April 1860	Writ of election issued by the Speaker of the Legislative Assembly.
3 May 1860	Nominations at Wollombi.
17 May 1860	Polling day.
31 May 1860	Return of writ

== Polling places ==
- Gosford
- Kincumber
- Mangrove Creek
- Millfield
- Wollombi
- Wyong

== Result ==
1860 Wollombi by-election Thursday 17 May
Candidate	Votes	%
Joseph Eckford (elected)	309	56.4
George Simpson	239	43.6
Total formal votes	548	100.0
Informal votes	0	0.0
Turnout	548	58.0

== See also ==
- Electoral results for the district of Wollombi
- List of New South Wales state by-elections
