= 1859 West Macquarie colonial by-election =

By-election in New South Wales, Australia

A by-election was held for the New South Wales Legislative Assembly electorate of West Macquarie on 21 December 1859 because John McPhillamy resigned.

== Dates ==
Date	Event
6 December 1859	John McPhillamy resigned.
7 December 1859	Writ of election issued by the Speaker of the Legislative Assembly.
21 December 1859	Nominations at Bathurst
28 December 1859	Polling day
4 January 1859	Return of writ

== Result ==
1859 West Macquarie by-election Wednesday 21 December
Candidate	Votes	%
Henry Mort (elected)	show of hands	
Richard Driver		

== See also ==
- Electoral results for the district of West Macquarie
- List of New South Wales state by-elections
