= 1859 East Macquarie colonial by-election =

By-election in New South Wales, Australia

A by-election was held for the New South Wales Legislative Assembly electorate of East Macquarie on 10 August 1859 because of the resignation of William Suttor Sr.

== Dates ==
Date	Event
13 September 1859	William Suttor resigned.
14 September 1859	Writ of election issued by the Speaker of the Legislative Assembly and close of electoral rolls.
29 September 1859	Nominations
6 October 1859	Polling day
13 October 1859	Return of writ

== Result ==
1859 East Macquarie by-election Thursday 6 October
Candidate	Votes	%
Thomas Hawkins (elected)	407	57.2
Daniel Deniehy	305	42.8
Total formal votes	712	100.0
Informal votes	0	0.0
Turnout	712	53.9

== See also ==
- Electoral results for the district of East Macquarie
- List of New South Wales state by-elections
