= 1859 East Maitland colonial by-election =

By-election in New South Wales, Australia

A by-election was held for the New South Wales Legislative Assembly electorate of East Maitland on 15 September 1859 because the seat of Joseph Chambers was declared vacant because he had accepted appointment as a Crown Prosecutor at Quarter Sessions.

== Dates ==
Date	Event
26 August 1859	Joseph Chambers appointed Crown Prosecutor.
31 August 1859	Joseph Chambers' seat declared vacant.
1 September 1859	Writ of election issued by the Speaker of the Legislative Assembly.
12 September 1859	Nominations
15 September 1859	Polling day
20 September 1859	Return of writ

== Result ==
1859 East Maitland by-election Thursday 15 September
Candidate	Votes	%
James Dickson (elected)	223	56.6
Peter Faucett	171	43.4
Total formal votes	394	100.0
Informal votes	0	0.0
Turnout	394	70.7

== See also ==
- Electoral results for the district of East Maitland
- List of New South Wales state by-elections
