= 1859 Mudgee colonial by-election =

By-election in New South Wales, Australia

A by-election was held for the New South Wales Legislative Assembly electorate of Mudgee on 19 December 1859 because of the resignation of Lyttleton Bayley. Bayley had been appointed to the Legislative Council in January 1859, shortly after arriving in the colony and the following month was appointed Attorney General in the Cowper Government. The government fell in October 1859 and Bayley resigned from parliament the following month.

== Dates ==
Date	Event
28 November 1859	Writ of election issued by the Speaker of the Legislative Assembly and close of electoral rolls.
16 December 1859	Nominations
19 December 1859	Polling day
23 December 1859	Return of writ

== Results ==
1859 Mudgee by-election Monday 19 December
Candidate	Votes	%
Samuel Terry (elected)	342	47.6
T H Sinden	376	52.4
Total formal votes	718	100.0
Informal votes	0	0.0
Turnout	718	35.6

== See also ==
- Electoral results for the district of Mudgee
- List of New South Wales state by-elections
