= George Pickering (politician) =

Australian politician (??–1876)

George Ferrers Pickering (died 14 July 1876) was an Australian politician.

He was a journalist before entering politics, and also a published playwright and poet. In 1865 he was elected to the New South Wales Legislative Assembly for Goldfields North, serving until his resignation in 1868. Pickering died at Levuka in Fiji in 1876.

New South Wales Legislative Assembly
Preceded by James Buchanan	Member for Goldfields North; 1865–1868	Succeeded by James Hoskins
