= James Murphy (New South Wales politician) =

Australian politician

James Murphy was an Australian politician.

He was one of Charles Cowper's 21 appointments to the New South Wales Legislative Council in May 1861, but did not take his seat. He was a member of Sydney City Council from 1857 to 1860 and served as mayor in 1860.

Civic offices
Preceded by George Smith	Mayor of Sydney; 1860	Succeeded by John Sutherland
