= Isaac Aaron =

English physician (1804–1877)

- Born: 1804; Birmingham, England
- Died: 17 August 1877 (aged 73)
- Occupation: Medical

Isaac Aaron (1804–1877) was an English-born physician who rose to prominence combating cholera outbreaks around his city of birth, Birmingham, during the 1830s. Instrumental in setting up a Central Board of Health for the area, and a member of the Society of Apothecaries and the Royal College of Surgeons, Aaron was considered posthumously as "one of the outstanding professional figures of his time".

After a decade of political and medical activity in England, he sailed to Australia and took up residency in New South Wales. He was editor of the New South Wales Medical Gazette and director, and later owner, of the Australian Medical Journal. He worked to reform medical practices in Australian hospitals, and was secretary of the Australian Medical Association. A man of faith, he was a leading Freemason and president of Sydney's Unitarian Church.
