= John Clements (Australian politician) =

Australian politician

John Findlater Clements (1819 – 2 September 1884) was an Irish-born Australian politician.

He was born in Balbriggan to Royal Navy lieutenant Hanbury Clements and Margaret Ingham. He migrated to New South Wales around 1833 and became a pastoralist, with over 160,000 acres in the Lachlan River area. In 1859 he was elected to the New South Wales Legislative Assembly for Bathurst, but he was defeated in 1860. On 8 March 1865 he married Charlotte Palmer, with whom he had four children. Clements died at Bathurst in 1884.

New South Wales Legislative Assembly
New seat	Member for Bathurst; 1859–1860	Succeeded by James Hart
