= William Roberts (Australian politician) =

Australian politician

William Roberts (1821 – 1 July 1900) was an Australian politician.

He was born in Sydney to William Roberts and Susannah Jane Moss. On 2 April 1842 he married Louisa Wilhelmina Kemp, with whom he had nine children. A solicitor from 1845, he practised in Sydney from 1851 and in Goulburn from 1858. In 1859 he was elected to the New South Wales Legislative Assembly for Goulburn, but he was defeated in 1860. Roberts returned to Sydney in 1871 and died there in 1900.

New South Wales Legislative Assembly
| New seat | Member for Goulburn; 1859–1860 | Succeeded by Charles Walsh |
