= Nicolas Hyeronimus =

Australian politician

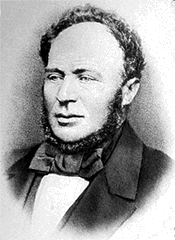

Member of the New South Wales Legislative Assembly for Wellington
- In office 15 June 1859 – 27 June 1860
- Preceded by: New seat
- Succeeded by: Silvanus Daniel

Personal details
- Born: 1 January 1808 Dinant, Namur, Wallonia (now part of Belgium)
- Died: 27 June 1860 Sydney, New South Wales
- Spouse: Ann Shaughnessy
- Children: 5 daughters, 3 sons
- Occupation: Innkeeper, Merchant, Pastoralist

Nicolas Hyeronimus (1 January 1808 – 27 June 1860) was a pioneering innkeeper, merchant, pastoralist and politician in colonial New South Wales, Australia.

Born in Wallonia (a region of modern Belgium), Hyeronimus arrived in New South Wales in about 1840. In 1842, he established the Lion of Waterloo, the first inn at Montefiores, near present-day Wellington, in the central west of New South Wales. He later built the first house in Wellington, and established the Carriers Arms, the first inn at the present site of Dubbo, New South Wales.

In about 1854, Hyeronimus built the homestead The Meeting of the Waters (now named Glenrock), on land west of the Bell River near Wellington. By 1859, he was the proprietor of Goonoo (now Goonoo Goonoo), a pastoral run of 30,000 acres (120 km^{2}) in Wellington County, and also three other pastoral runs totalling 61,480 acres (248.8 km^{2}) in Bligh County.

On 15 June 1859, Hyeronimus was elected to the New South Wales Legislative Assembly as the inaugural member for the electoral district of Wellington. However, he died in Sydney in 1860, after serving only just over one year in office.

New South Wales Legislative Assembly
Preceded by New seat	Member for Wellington; 1859 – 1860	Succeeded by Silvanus Daniel
