= James Buchanan (New South Wales politician) =

Australian politician

James Buchanan (1827 – 9 December 1891) was an Australian politician.

He was born at Darling Point and before entering politics was a goldfields commissioner in New England. In 1863 he was elected to the New South Wales Legislative Assembly for Goldfields North, but he did not re-contest in 1864. He was later a stipendiary magistrate and retired around 1887 as president of the Central Police Court. Buchanan died at Darling Point in 1891.

New South Wales Legislative Assembly
Preceded by James Hoskins	Member for Goldfields North; 1863–1864	Succeeded by George Pickering
