= Charles Hamilton Walsh =

Irish-born Australian politician

Charles Hamilton Walsh (c. 1820 – 8 November 1874) was an Irish-born Australian politician.

He was born at Ballinamore in County Leitrim to merchant William Walsh and Sarah Matchett. Around 1844 he married Anne Bole, with whom he had six children. He migrated to New South Wales around 1848 and settled as a solicitor at Goulburn, where he acquired extensive property and became the first mayor in 1859. In 1860 he was elected to the New South Wales Legislative Assembly for Goulburn, but he resigned in 1861. Around 1872 he moved to Sydney and then subsequently to at Bathurst. He died at Bathurst in 1874.

New South Wales Legislative Assembly
Preceded by William Roberts	Member for Goulburn; 1860–1861	Succeeded by Maurice Alexander
