= Henry O'Brien (Australian politician) =

Australian politician

Personal details
- Born: 1793 Hollymount, County Mayo, Ireland
- Died: 27 January 1866 (aged 73) Douro, Yass
- Resting place: Yass
- Spouse(s): Isabella Macdonald; Elizabeth Sadlier Cruden
- Children: Henry
- Parents: Henry O'Brien (father); Catherine née Browne (mother)
- Relatives: Cornelius O'Brien

Henry O'Brien (1793 – 27 January 1866) was an Irish-born politician and pastoralist in New South Wales, Australia.

== Early life ==
He was born at Hollymount in County Mayo to farmer Henry O'Brien and Catherine née Browne. His father died when he was young and he and his brothers Cornelius and Thomas were raised by their uncle William Browne. He worked on his uncle's properties before migrating to Sydney via Calcutta, arriving in April 1816. His mother, uncle and brothers all arrived in Sydney in 1816. Henry assisted in managing a property at Abbotsbury, while Cornelious managed a property in the Illawarra. From 1821 Henry was granted 600 acres (240 ha) at Bathurst where he established a sheep station. Thomas disappeared on a journey to Bathurst in 1823. O'Brien also acquired a sheep station at Jugiong, which he named Douro. On 25 July 1836 he married Isabella Macdonald, however she died two years later (aged 27). O'Brien remarried on 28 November 1840 to Elizabeth Sadlier Cruden, with whom he had a son also named Henry.

There was a depression in New South Wales in 1843 and sheep were unsaleable. O'Brien popularised the process of boiling down wethers to produce tallow which restored some value to the sheep. He had introduced merino sheep to the Yass district, having bought 5 rams from John Macarthur, which he crossed with Saxon sheep and subsequently imported Negretti sheep as part of his breeding activities. O'Brien returned to England with his family in 1856 and his son was educated at Eton College.

== Political career ==
O'Brien was elected a member of the Yass District Council in 1844, along with his brother Cornelious In 1860 he was elected unopposed to the Legislative Assembly for Yass Plains, but he resigned in 1861 due to ill health.

== Later life and death ==
O'Brien was winding up his affairs in New South Wales, intending to join Elizabeth in England, however he died at Douro near Jugiong on the Yass Plains in 1866 (aged 73). He was survived by Elizabeth, his son having died in August 1865. Elizabeth died at Bishopthorpe in Goulburn on 21 June 1892.

New South Wales Legislative Assembly
Preceded by Thomas Laidlaw	Member for Yass Plains; 1860 – 1861	Succeeded by Peter Faucett
