= Thomas Laidlaw (politician) =

Politician, shopkeeper and pastoralist in New South Wales, Australia

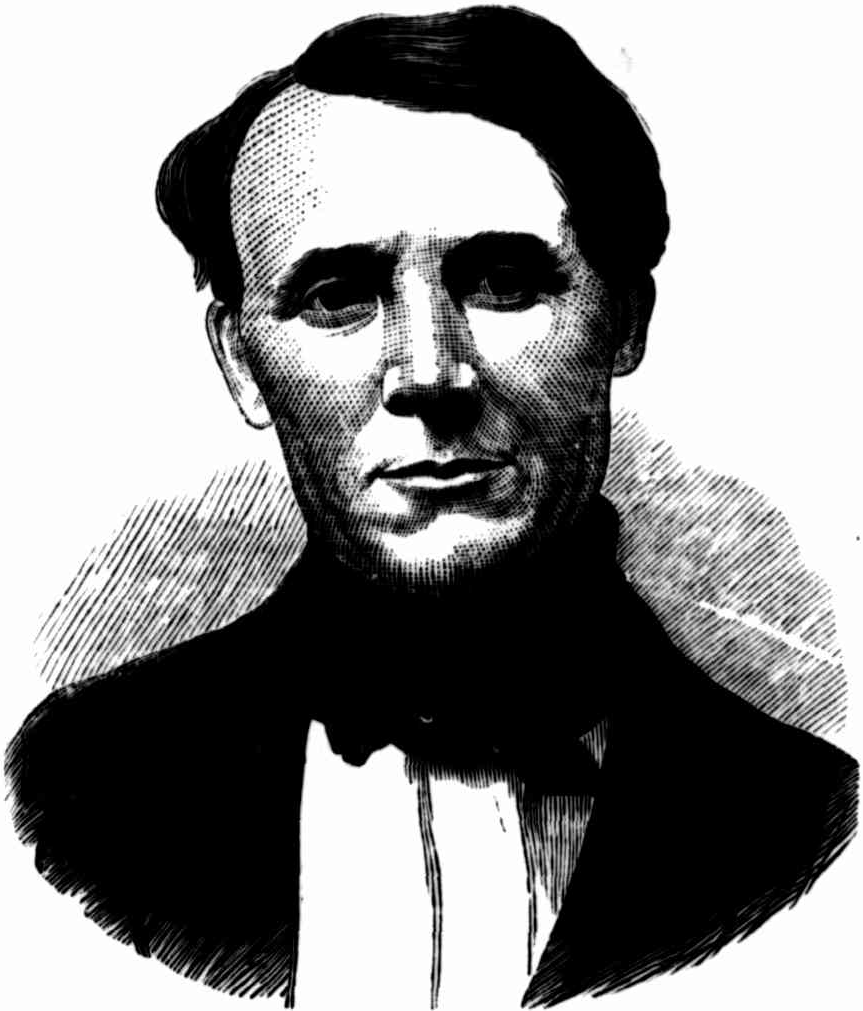
Thomas Laidlaw

Thomas Laidlaw (23 September 1813 – 12 June 1876) was a Scottish-born Australian politician.

He was born at Melrose in Roxburghshire to merchant Alexander Laidlaw and Helen Cochrane. A banker, he migrated to New South Wales in 1839 and settled at Yass, where he became a partner in a general store. In 1841 he married Catherine Galvin, however she died the following year and they had no children.

In 1859 he was elected unopposed to the New South Wales Legislative Assembly for Yass Plains, but immediately resigned as he realised his role as deputy postmaster at Yass, on a salary of £20 a year, was an office of profit under the crown which disqualified him from parliament. He resigned as postmaster and was re-elected unopposed. He declined the position of Colonial Treasurer in the second Cowper ministry. He did not re-contest in 1860 and could not be persuaded to stand for parliament again. He remained active in local politics, supporting the re-election of Robert Isaacs in 1866. He was nominated at the election in 1869, however this was without his consent as he supported the candidacy of Michael Fitzpatrick.

In 1866 he sold his store, which had now expanded to include brewery and post office, and became a pastoralist.

Laidlaw died at Yass on 12 June 1876 (aged 62).

New South Wales Legislative Assembly
New district	Member for Yass Plains; 1859–1860	Succeeded by Henry O'Brien
