= Electoral district of Goldfields North =

Former state electoral district of New South Wales, Australia

Goldfields North was an electoral district of the Legislative Assembly in the Australian state of New South Wales from 1859 to 1880, including the goldfields within several northern electorates. Rolls were not kept for goldfields seats, voters being able to establish their right to vote by presenting either a mining licence or business licence in a proclaimed gold field that had been held for at least six months. Voters could also appear on the roll for general districts, but were prevented from voting in both their resident general district and the overlaying goldfields district. This meant that voters could vote tactically, if their candidate was unopposed—as James Hoskins was in the 1860 election—or their preferred candidate was assured of election, they could vote in the other electorate.

== Members for Goldfields North ==
| Member | Party | Period |
|---|---|---|
| James Hoskins | None | 1859–1863 |
| James Buchanan | None | 1863–1864 |
| George Pickering | None | 1865–1868 |
| James Hoskins | None | 1868–1869 |
| Robert Wisdom | None | 1870–1870 |
| Robert Forster | None | 1870–1872 |
| James Rodd | None | 1872–1874 |
| Robert Forster | None | 1875–1877 |
| Henry Copeland | None | 1877–1880 |

== Election results ==
1877 New South Wales colonial election: Goldfields North Monday 12 November
| Candidate | Votes | % |
|---|---|---|
| Henry Copeland (elected) | unopposed | |
