= Thomas Lewis (1821–1897) =

Welsh-born Australian politician

Thomas Lewis (1821 – 16 April 1897) was a Welsh-born Australian politician.

He was born at Merthyr Tydfil to miner David Lewis and Mary Richards. A coal miner, he migrated to New South Wales around 1857 and settled near Newcastle. In 1860 he was elected to the New South Wales Legislative Assembly for Northumberland, but he resigned in 1862 to become inspector of collieries. On 20 January 1881 he married Catherine Maria Hewlett, with whom he had a daughter. Lewis died at Wollongong in 1897.

New South Wales Legislative Assembly
Preceded by Alexander Scott	Member for Northumberland; 1860–1862	Succeeded by Atkinson Tighe
