= James Hoskins =

Australian politician

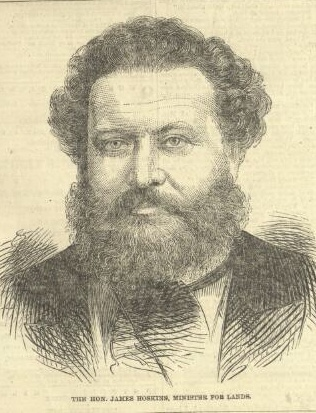
James Hoskins, 1880

James Hoskins (1823 – 1 April 1900) was a politician in colonial New South Wales.

Hoskins was born in London and emigrated to Australia in 1853. After a varied experience on the diggings, he was elected to the New South Wales Legislative Assembly for the new district of Goldfields North at the 1859 election, supported by voluntary contributions from miners. He held the seat at the 1859 election, until financial reasons forced his resignation in 1863, becoming the overseer of northern roads.

He was elected to his former seat at the 1868 by-election. In December 1869 he was returned for Patrick's Plains, and in February 1872 for Tumut. Hoskins was Secretary for Public Works in the Parkes Government from March to August 1877, and Secretary for Lands in the Parkes-Robertson Ministry from December 1878 to December 1881.

He was nominated to the New South Wales Legislative Council on 27 February 1889, a position he held until his death in Strathfield, Sydney, New South Wales on 1 April 1900 (aged 77).

New South Wales Legislative Assembly
New district	Member for Goldfields North; 1859–1863	Succeeded by James Buchanan
Preceded by George Pickering	Member for Goldfields North; 1868–1869	Succeeded by Robert Wisdom
Preceded by Bowie Wilson	Member for Patrick's Plains; 1869–1872	Succeeded by William Browne
Preceded by Edward Brown	Member for Tumut; 1872–1882	Succeeded by Thomas O'Mara
Political offices
Preceded by John Lackey	Member for Secretary for Public Works; 1877	Succeeded by Edward Combes
Preceded by James Farnell	Member for Secretary for Lands; 1878–1881	Succeeded by Sir John Robertson
