= John Peisley (politician) =

Australian politician

John Peisley (1805 – 9 December 1871) was an Australian politician.

He was born in New South Wales to ex-convict farmer John Peisley and publican Elizabeth Boswell. He ran a store in Orange, and on 11 December 1833 married Mary Dean, with whom he had eight children. In 1860 he was elected to the New South Wales Legislative Assembly for Orange, but he resigned in 1862. Peisley died at Orange in 1871.

New South Wales Legislative Assembly
Preceded by Saul Samuel	Member for Orange; 1860 – 1862	Succeeded by James Martin
Civic offices
New office	Chairmen of the Municipality of Orange; 1860 – 1861	Succeeded by George McKay
