= Silvanus Daniel =

English-born Australian politician

Silvanus Brown Daniel (1 February 1815 – 31 December 1874) was an English-born Australian politician.

He was born at Hastings to gentleman Thomas Daniel and Anna Maria Brown. He came to New South Wales at a young age, and on 12 December 1853 married Elizabeth Australia West, with whom he had seven children. He leased almost 20,000 acres near Wellington and was commissioner of crown lands before entering politics. In 1860 he was elected to the New South Wales Legislative Assembly for Wellington, serving until his resignation in 1862. The following month he was reappointed a commissioner of crown lands. A squatter in later life, he died at Bathurst in 1874.

New South Wales Legislative Assembly
Preceded by Nicolas Hyeronimus	Member for Wellington; 1860–1862	Succeeded by Saul Samuel
