= Members of the New South Wales Legislative Assembly, 1864–1869 =

Members of the New South Wales Legislative Assembly who served in the fifth parliament of New South Wales held their seats from 1864 until 1869. The 1864–65 election was held between 22 November 1864 and 10 January 1865 with parliament first meeting on 24 January 1865. The Speaker was John Hay until 31 October 1865 and then William Arnold.

Name	Electorate	Years in office
Maurice Alexander	Goulburn	1861–1872
William Arnold	Paterson	1856–1875
Archibald Bell ^{20}	Upper Hunter	1868–1872
Edward Brown ^{10}	Tumut	1866–1872, 1891–1894
Stephen Brown	Newtown	1864–1881
David Buchanan ^{19}	East Macquarie	1860–1862, 1864–1867, 1869–1877, 1879–1885, 1888–1889
Marshall Burdekin ^{8, 16}	Williams, East Sydney	1863–1866, 1867–1869
John Burns	Hunter	1861–1869, 1872–1891
James Byrnes	Parramatta	1858–1861, 1864–1872
John Caldwell ^{13}	East Sydney	1860–1866
James Campbell	Morpeth	1864–1874
William Campbell ^{23}	West Sydney	1868–1869, 1880–1886
Walter Church ^{25}	Goldfields West	1869–1872
Theophilus Cooper	New England	1864–1869
Sir Charles Cowper ^{16}	East Sydney	1856–1859, 1860–1870
Charles Cowper, Jr. ^{10}	Tumut	1860–1866
William Cummings	East Macquarie	1859–1874
James Cunneen	Hawkesbury	1860–1869, 1872–1877
Thomas Dangar ^{3}	Gwydir	1865–1885, 1887–1890
John Darvall ^{4}	West Sydney	1859–1865
Leopold De Salis	Queanbeyan	1864–1869
Phillip Dignam	Argyle	1864–1869
Alexander Dodds	East Maitland	1864–1872
Stephen Donnelly ^{15}	Goldfields West	1864–1866
Richard Driver	West Macquarie	1860–1880
Geoffrey Eagar ^{4}	West Sydney	1863–1864, 1865–1869
Joseph Eckford	Wollombi	1860–1872, 1877–1882
Daniel Egan	Eden	1856–1870
Peter Faucett ^{6}	Yass Plains	1856–1859, 1860, 1861–1865
James Farnell	Parramatta	1860–1860, 1864–1885, 1887–1888
William Forlonge ^{18}	Orange	1864–1867
William Forster	Hastings	1856–1860, 1861–1864, 1864–1869, 1869–1874, 1875–1876, 1880–1882
Thomas Garrett	Shoalhaven	1860–1871, 1872–1891
Hugh Gordon	Tenterfield	1861–1869
William Grahame ^{2}	Monaro	1865–1869, 1872–1874
James Hannell	Newcastle	1860–1869, 1872–1874
John Hart	East Sydney	1859–1872
John Hay ^{17}	Central Cumberland	1856–1857, 1858–1864, 1864–1867
Richard Hill ^{22}	Canterbury	1868–1877
James Hoskins ^{21}	Goldfields North	1859–1863, 1868–1882
John Hurley	Narellan	1859–1860, 1864–1880
Robert Isaacs ^{6}	Yass Plains	1865–1869
Samuel Joseph ^{23}	West Sydney	1864–1868
Joshua Josephson ^{26}	Braidwood	1864–1869
Michael Kelly ^{26}	Braidwood	1869–1870
James Kemp ^{14}	Bathurst	1864–1866
John Lackey ^{17}	Central Cumberland	1860–1864, 1867–1880
Robert Landale	Murray	1864–1869
John Dunmore Lang	West Sydney	1859–1869
John Laycock ^{11}	Clarence	1859–1866
Benjamin Lee	West Maitland	1864–1874
George Lord	Bogan	1856–1877
John Lloyd	Liverpool Plains	1864–1869
John Lucas ^{1}	Canterbury Hartley	1860–1869, 1871–1880
Samuel Lyons ^{24}	Central Cumberland	1859–1860, 1868–1869
William Macleay	Murrumbidgee	1856–1874
Allan Macpherson ^{24}	Central Cumberland	1863–1868
Frederick Manton ^{8, 9}	Williams	1866
Sir James Martin ^{2}	Lachlan, Monaro	1856, 1857–1860, 1862–1873
Thomas Mate	Hume	1860–1869
George McKay ^{18}	Orange	1867–1869
John Morrice	Camden	1860–1872
James Neale	East Sydney	1864–1874
John Nowlan ^{9}	Williams	1866–1874
James Oatley	Canterbury	1864–1869
Patrick Osborne ^{12}	Illawarra	1864–1866
Henry Parkes	Kiama	1856, 1858, 1859–1861, 1864–1870, 1872–1895
James Pemell ^{1, 22}	Canterbury	1859–1860, 1865–1869
Joseph Phelps	Balranald	1864–1877
George Pickering ^{21}	Goldfields North	1865–1868
William Piddington	Hawkesbury	1856–1877
Richard Roberts	Camden	1864–1869
John Robertson ^{5, 7, 11}	West Sydney, Clarence	1856–1861, 1862–1865, 1865–1866, 1866–1870, 1870–1877, 1877–1878, 1882–1886
James Rodd	Goldfields South	1865–1869, 1872–1874
James Ryan	Nepean	1860–1872
Saul Samuel	Wellington	1859–1860, 1862–1872
Thomas Smart	Glebe	1860–1869
John Stewart ^{12}	Illawarra	1866–1869, 1871–1871
Robert Stewart ^{13}	East Sydney	1860–1864, 1866–1869
Barnard Stimpson	Carcoar	1864–1869
John Sutherland	Paddington	1860–1881, 1882–1889
John Suttor ^{19}	East Macquarie	1867–1872
William Suttor ^{14}	Bathurst	1856–1859, 1860–1864, 1866–1872
Samuel Terry	Mudgee	1859–1869, 1871–1881
George Thornton ^{15, 25}	Goldfields West	1858–1859, 1867–1868
Atkinson Tighe	Northumberland	1862–1869, 1882–1884
William Tunks	St Leonards	1864–1874
William Walker	Windsor	1860–1869
James White ^{20}	Upper Hunter	1864–1868
Bowie Wilson	Patrick's Plains	1859–1872
William Windeyer ^{7}	West Sydney	1859–1862, 1866–1872, 1876–1879
Robert Wisdom	Lower Hunter	1859–1872, 1874–1887

By-elections Under the constitution, ministers were required to resign to recontest their seats in a by-election when appointed. These by-elections are only noted when the minister was defeated; in general, he was elected unopposed.

#	Electorate	Departing Member	Reason for By-election	Date of By-election	Winner of By-election
1	Canterbury	John Lucas	Elected to two seats	24 February 1865	James Pemell
2	Monaro	James Martin	Elected to two seats	10 April 1865	William Grahame
3	Gwydir	Thomas Dangar	Position of profit under the crown	29 June 1865	Thomas Dangar
4	West Sydney	John Darvall	Retired to England	7 July 1865	Geoffrey Eagar
5	West Sydney	John Robertson	Financial Difficulty	20 October 1865	John Robertson
6	Yass Plains	Peter Faucett	Appointed as a judge in the New South Wales Supreme Court	6 November 1865	Robert Isaacs
7	West Sydney	John Robertson	Ministerial by-election	17 January 1866	William Charles Windeyer
8	Williams	Marshall Burdekin	Ministerial by-election	22 January 1866	Frederick Manton
9	Williams	Frederick Manton	Financial Difficulty	19 April 1866	John Nowlan
10	Tumut	Charles Cowper, Jr.	Absent from parliament without leave	20 August 1866	Edward Brown
11	Clarence	John Laycock	Cause of resignation is unknown	27 August 1866	John Robertson
12	Illawarra	Patrick Osborne	Prolonged trip to England	6 September 1866	John Stewart
13	East Sydney	John Caldwell	Financial Difficulty	24 September 1866	Robert Stewart
14	Bathurst	James Kemp	Cause of resignation is unknown	24 December 1866	William Suttor
15	Goldfields West	Stephen Donnelly	Cause of resignation is unknown	26 February 1867	George Thornton
16	East Sydney	Sir Charles Cowper	Financial Difficulty	20 March 1867	Marshall Burdekin
17	Central Cumberland	John Hay	Appointed to the Legislative Council	27 June 1867	John Lackey
18	Orange	William Forlonge	Financial Difficulty	1 July 1867	George McKay
19	East Macquarie	David Buchanan	Traveled to England to study for the bar	26 August 1867	John Suttor
20	Upper Hunter	James White	Prolonged trip to England	6 June 1868	Archibald Bell
21	Goldfields North	George Pickering	Cause of resignation is unknown	6 July 1868	James Hoskins
22	Canterbury	James Pemell	Cause of resignation is unknown	19 September 1868	Richard Hill
23	West Sydney	Samuel Joseph	Prolonged trip to England	15 December 1868	William Campbell
24	Central Cumberland	Allan Macpherson	Cause of resignation is unknown	17 December 1868	Samuel Lyons
25	Goldfields West	George Thornton	Lengthy trip to England	15 February 1869	Walter Church
26	Braidwood	Joshua Josephson	Appointed a district court judge	25 September 1869	Michael Kelly

== See also ==
- First Martin ministry
- Fourth Cowper ministry
- Second Martin ministry
- Second Robertson ministry
- Results of the 1864–65 New South Wales colonial election
- Candidates of the 1864–65 New South Wales colonial election
