= Candidates of the 1864–65 New South Wales colonial election =

This is a list of candidates for the 1864–65 New South Wales colonial election. The election was held from 22 November 1864 to 10 January 1865.

There was no recognisable party structure at this election.

== Retiring Members ==
- David Bell MLA (Camden)
- James Buchanan MLA (Goldfields North)
- Edward Close MLA (Morpeth)
- William Dalley MLA (Carcoar)
- Joseph Harpur MLA (Patrick's Plains)
- Robert Haworth MLA (Illawarra)
- Thomas Holt MLA (Newtown)
- Clark Irving MLA (Clarence)
- Henry Milford MLA (Braidwood)
- William Redman MLA (Queanbeyan)
- John Ryan MLA (Lachlan)
- Richard Sadleir MLA (Lower Hunter)
- Isaac Shepherd MLA (St Leonards)
- Robert Stewart MLA (East Sydney)
- Elias Weekes MLA (West Maitland)

== Legislative Assembly ==
Sitting members are shown in bold text. Successful candidates are highlighted.

Electorates are arranged chronologically from the day the poll was held. Because of the sequence of polling, some sitting members who were defeated in their constituencies were then able to contest other constituencies later in the polling period. On the second occasion, these members are shown in italic text.

Electorate	Successful candidates	Unsuccessful candidates
Tuesday 22 November 1864
East Sydney	**John Caldwell**; **Charles Cowper**; **James Hart**; James Neale	William Cover; Richard Dransfield; Thomas Duigan; **William Forster**; Robert Isaacs; **James Martin**
Wednesday 23 November 1864
Paddington	**John Sutherland**	Henry Mort
Thursday 24 November 1864
Parramatta	James Byrnes; James Farnell	Frederick Birmingham; **Arthur Holroyd**; **John Lackey**
West Sydney	**John Darvall**; Samuel Joseph; **John Lang**; **John Robertson**	**Daniel Dalgleish**; **Geoffrey Eagar**; **William Love**; James Murphy
Windsor	**William Walker**	George Pitt
Saturday 26 November 1864
Central Cumberland	**John Hay**; **Allan Macpherson**	James Atkinson; **John Laycock**; George Oakes
Tuesday 29 November 1864
Glebe	**Thomas Smart**	Daniel Dalgleish
Hawkesbury	**James Cunneen**; **William Piddington**	
Wednesday 7 December 1864
Canterbury	**John Lucas**; James Oatley	John Beer; William Forster; Samuel Lyons; **Edward Raper**; Tertius Rider; William Roberts
Goulburn	**Maurice Alexander**	Phillip Dignam; Henry Sibley
Newtown	Stephen Brown	
St Leonards	William Tunks	Edward Sayers
Thursday 8 December 1864
Hartley	**John Lucas**	Andrew Brown
Lower Hunter	**Robert Wisdom**	Archibald Jacob
Williams	**Marshall Burdekin**	**William Allen**; Frederick Manton; J West
Friday 9 December 1864
Hunter	**John Burns**	
Patrick's Plains	**Bowie Wilson**	John Waller
Saturday 10 December 1864
Illawarra	Patrick Osborne	John Stewart
Nepean	**James Ryan**	William Cover; George Sanders; Thomas Shepherd
Tumut	**Charles Cowper Jr.**	James Martin
Tuesday 13 December 1864
Braidwood	Joshua Josephson	Michael O'Haire
Morpeth	James Campbell	John Keating
West Maitland	Benjamin Lee	Peter Green; Andrew Liddell; George Rochester
Wollombi	**Joseph Eckford**	Lyall Scott
Wednesday 14 December 1864
Paterson	**William Arnold**	Geoffrey Eagar
Thursday 15 December 1864
Camden	**John Morrice**; Richard Roberts	Henry Badgery; **Augustus Morris**
Upper Hunter	James White	**Thomas Dangar**
Friday 16 December 1864
Argyle	Phillip Dignam	**Samuel Emmanuel**
East Maitland	Alexander Dodds	
Saturday 17 December 1864
Narellan	John Hurley	**Joseph Leary**
Orange	William Forlonge	
Queanbeyan	Leopold De Salis	Charles Campbell; Abraham Levy
Tuesday 20 December 1864
Kiama	**Henry Parkes**	Samuel Charles
Yass Plains	**Peter Faucett**	William Harbottle
Wednesday 21 December 1864
Bathurst	James Kemp	**Henry Rotton**
Carcoar	Barnard Stimpson	
Shoalhaven	**Thomas Garrett**	Richard Kemp; R Seccombe
Wellington	**Saul Samuel**	James Martin
Thursday 22 December 1864
Bogan	**George Lord**	
Newcastle	**James Hannell**	Thomas Adam; Charles Bolton; William Brookes
Saturday 24 December 1864
East Macquarie	**David Buchanan**; **William Cummings**	Thomas Lee; Patrick McDonagh
Eden	**Daniel Egan**	
Gwydir	Thomas Dangar, Jr.	**Francis Rusden**; John Single
Hastings	William Forster	Horace Dean; **Henry Flett**
Hume	**Thomas Mate**	Morris Asher; Walter Miller
Liverpool Plains	John Lloyd	
Monaro	James Martin	William Brodribb; William Grahame
Mudgee	**Samuel Terry**	Joseph Innes
Murray	Robert Landale	
Murrumbidgee	**William Macleay**	
New England	Theophilus Cooper	**Robert Forster**
Northumberland	**Atkinson Tighe**	William Brookes
Tenterfield	**Hugh Gordon**	Peel Raymond
West Macquarie	**Richard Driver**	
Wednesday 28 December 1864
Lachlan	James Martin	Andrew Lynch
Thursday 29 December 1864
Clarence	John Laycock	Richard Bligh
Tuesday 10 January 1865
Goldfields North	George Pickering	Henry Roman; Thomas Rusden
Goldfields South	James Rodd	T R Browne; Daniel Dalgleish
Goldfields West	Stephen Donnelly	
Wednesday 18 January 1865
Balranald	Joseph Phelps	

== See also ==
- Members of the New South Wales Legislative Assembly, 1864–1869

== Bibliography ==
- Green, Antony. "1864-5 election candidate index". New South Wales Election Results 1856-2007. New South Wales Parliament.
