= Results of the 1864–65 New South Wales colonial election =

Colonial election for New South Wales, Australia in 1864–65

New South Wales colonial election, 22 November 1864 – 10 January 1865 Legislative Assembly << 1860–1869–70 >>
Enrolled voters	111,302				
Votes cast	66,775		Turnout	51.40 (Note: There were 15 uncontested districts and turnout is based on the roll of 84,683 for the contested districts.)	+8.49
Informal votes	156		Informal	0.36	+0.19
Summary of votes by party
Party	Primary votes	%	Swing	Seats	Change
Total	66,775			72	

The 1864–65 New South Wales colonial election was for 72 members representing 60 electoral districts. The election was conducted on the basis of a simple majority or first-past-the-post voting system. In this election there were 8 multi-member districts returning 20 members and 52 single member districts. In the multi-member districts each elector could vote for as many candidates as there were vacancies. 11 districts were uncontested.

There were three districts that did not have a residential or property qualification, Goldfields North (650), Goldfields South (3,720) and Goldfields West (8,400). The average number of enrolled voters per seat in the other districts was 1,394 ranging from The Paterson (536) to The Lachlan (3,592). The electoral boundaries were established under the Electoral Act 1858 (NSW).

== Election results ==
=== Argyle ===
1864–65 New South Wales colonial election: Argyle Friday 16 December 1864
Candidate	Votes	%
Phillip Dignam (elected)	569	52.5
Samuel Emmanuel (defeated)	515	47.5
Total formal votes	1,084	100.0
Informal votes	0	0.0
Turnout	1,084	56.5

=== Balranald ===
1864–65 New South Wales colonial election: Balranald Wednesday 18 January 1865
Candidate	Votes	%
Joseph Phelps (elected)	unopposed	

=== Bathurst ===
1864–65 New South Wales colonial election: Bathurst Wednesday 21 December 1864
Candidate	Votes	%
James Kemp (elected)	344	58.4
Henry Rotton (defeated)	245	41.6
Total formal votes	589	100.0
Informal votes	0	0.0
Turnout	589	51.7

=== The Bogan ===
1864–65 New South Wales colonial election: The Bogan Thursday 22 December 1864
Candidate	Votes	%
George Lord (re-elected)	unopposed	

=== Braidwood ===
1864–65 New South Wales colonial election: Braidwood Tuesday 13 December 1864
Candidate	Votes	%
Joshua Josephson (elected)	640	50.3
Michael O'Haire	632	49.7
Total formal votes	1,272	97.0
Informal votes	40	3.1
Turnout	1,311	44.8

=== Camden ===
1864–65 New South Wales colonial election: Camden Thursday 15 December 1864
Candidate	Votes	%
John Morrice (re-elected 1)	862	30.0
Richard Roberts (elected 2)	742	25.8
Henry Badgery	642	22.3
Augustus Morris (defeated)	628	21.9
Total formal votes	2,874	100.0
Informal votes	0	0.0
Turnout	1,542	57.8

=== Canterbury ===
1864–65 New South Wales colonial election: Canterbury Wednesday 7 December 1864
Candidate	Votes	%
James Oatley (elected 1)	937	32.3
John Lucas (re-elected 2)	785	27.1
Edward Raper (defeated)	385	13.3
Samuel Lyons	374	12.9
William Roberts	324	11.2
William Forster	68	2.4
Tertius Rider	15	0.5
John Beer	10	0.4
Total formal votes	2,898	100.0
Informal votes	0	0.0
Turnout	1,792	51.1

=== Carcoar ===
1864–65 New South Wales colonial election: Carcoar Wednesday 21 December 1864
Candidate	Votes	%
Barnard Stimpson (elected)	unopposed	

=== The Clarence ===
1864–65 New South Wales colonial election: The Clarence Thursday 29 December 1864
Candidate	Votes	%
John Laycock (elected)	549	58.7
Richard Bligh	386	41.3
Total formal votes	935	97.4
Informal votes	25	2.6
Turnout	986	48.8

=== Central Cumberland ===
1864–65 New South Wales colonial election: Central Cumberland Saturday 26 November 1864
Candidate	Votes	%
John Hay (re-elected 1)	584	33.6
Allan Macpherson (re-elected 2)	549	31.6
John Laycock (defeated)	401	23.1
George Oakes	184	10.6
James Atkinson	19	1.1
Total formal votes	1,737	100.0
Informal votes	0	0.0
Turnout	1,737	38.8

=== East Macquarie ===
1864–65 New South Wales colonial election: East Macquarie Saturday 24 December 1864
Candidate	Votes	%
William Cummings (re-elected 1)	955	39.0
David Buchanan (re-elected 2)	800	32.6
Thomas Lee	623	25.4
Patrick McDonagh	73	3.0
Total formal votes	2,451	100.0
Informal votes	0	0.0
Turnout	1,491	66.4

=== East Maitland ===
1864–65 New South Wales colonial election: East Maitland Friday 16 December 1864
Candidate	Votes	%
Alexander Dodds (elected)	unopposed	

=== East Sydney ===
1864–65 New South Wales colonial election: East Sydney Tuesday 22 November 1864
Candidate	Votes	%
Charles Cowper (re-elected 1)	2,711	18.7
John Caldwell (re-elected 2)	2,447	16.9
James Neale (elected 3)	2,107	14.6
James Hart (re-elected 4)	2,069	14.3
James Martin (defeated)	1,769	12.2
William Forster (defeated)	1,733	12.0
Robert Isaacs	1,351	9.3
Richard Dransfield	190	1.3
Thomas Duigan	43	0.3
William Cover	43	0.3
Total formal votes	14,463	100.0
Informal votes	0	0.0
Turnout	4,191	46.8

=== Eden ===
1864–65 New South Wales colonial election: Eden Saturday 24 December 1864
Candidate	Votes	%
Daniel Egan (re-elected)	unopposed	

=== The Glebe ===
1864–65 New South Wales colonial election: The Glebe Tuesday 29 November 1864
Candidate	Votes	%
Thomas Smart (re-elected)	622	58.0
Daniel Dalgleish	451	42.0
Total formal votes	1,073	100.0
Informal votes	0	0.0
Turnout	1,073	53.7

=== Goldfields North ===
1864–65 New South Wales colonial election: Goldfields North Tuesday 10 January 1865
Candidate	Votes	%
George Pickering (elected)	269	71.0
Thomas Rusden	87	23.0
Henry Roman	23	6.1
Total formal votes	379	100.0
Informal votes	0	0.0
Turnout	379	58.3

=== Goldfields South ===
1864–65 New South Wales colonial election: Goldfields South Tuesday 10 January 1865
Candidate	Votes	%
James Rodd (elected)	276	49.1
Daniel Dalgleish	264	47.0
T R Browne	22	3.9
Total formal votes	562	100.0
Informal votes	0	0.0
Turnout	561	15.1

=== Goldfields West ===
1864–65 New South Wales colonial election: Goldfields West Tuesday 10 January 1865
Candidate	Votes	%
Stephen Donnelly (elected)	unopposed	

=== Goulburn ===
1864–65 New South Wales colonial election: Goulburn Wednesday 7 December 1864
Candidate	Votes	%
Maurice Alexander (re-elected)	278	61.6
Phillip Dignam	172	38.1
Henry Sibley	1	0.2
Total formal votes	451	98.0
Informal votes	9	2.0
Turnout	460	67.6

=== The Gwydir ===
1864–65 New South Wales colonial election: The Gwydir Tuesday 24 January 1865
Candidate	Votes	%
Thomas Dangar (elected)	145	52.2
John Single	92	33.1
Francis Rusden (defeated)	41	14.8
Total formal votes	278	100.0
Informal votes	0	0.0
Turnout	278	29.5

=== Hartley ===
1864–65 New South Wales colonial election: Hartley Thursday 8 December 1864
Candidate	Votes	%
John Lucas (elected)	231	55.5
Andrew Brown	185	44.5
Total formal votes	416	100.0
Informal votes	0	0.0
Turnout	416	37.4

=== The Hastings ===
1864–65 New South Wales colonial election: The Hastings Saturday 24 December 1864
Candidate	Votes	%
William Forster (elected)	530	47.4
Henry Flett (defeated)	328	29.3
Horace Dean	260	23.3
Total formal votes	1,118	100.0
Informal votes	0	0.0
Turnout	1,133	62.4

=== The Hawkesbury ===
1864–65 New South Wales colonial election: The Hawkesbury Tuesday 29 November 1864
Candidate	Votes	%
William Piddington (re-elected)	unopposed	
James Cunneen (re-elected)	unopposed	

=== The Hume ===
1864–65 New South Wales colonial election: The Hume Saturday 24 December 1864
Candidate	Votes	%
Thomas Mate (re-elected)	243	44.8
Morris Asher	234	43.2
Walter Miller	65	12.0
Total formal votes	542	100.0
Informal votes	0	0.0
Turnout	542	47.5

=== The Hunter ===
1864–65 New South Wales colonial election: The Hunter Friday 9 December 1864
Candidate	Votes	%
John Burns (re-elected)	unopposed	

=== Illawarra ===
1864–65 New South Wales colonial election: Illawarra Saturday 10 December 1864
Candidate	Votes	%
Patrick Osborne (elected)	561	56.7
John Stewart	428	43.3
Total formal votes	989	100.0
Informal votes	0	0.0
Turnout	989	79.4

=== Kiama ===
1864–65 New South Wales colonial election: Kiama Tuesday 20 December 1864
Candidate	Votes	%
Henry Parkes (re-elected)	578	62.1
Samuel Charles	353	37.9
Total formal votes	931	100.0
Informal votes	0	0.0
Turnout	931	76.6

=== The Lachlan ===
1864–65 New South Wales colonial election: The Lachlan Wednesday 28 December 1864
Candidate	Votes	%
James Martin (elected)	692	73.4
Andrew Lynch	251	26.6
Total formal votes	943	100.0
Informal votes	0	0.0
Turnout	943	26.3

=== Liverpool Plains ===
1864–65 New South Wales colonial election: Liverpool Plains Saturday 24 December 1864
Candidate	Votes	%
John Lloyd (elected)	unopposed	

=== The Lower Hunter ===
1864–65 New South Wales colonial election: The Lower Hunter Thursday 8 December 1864
Candidate	Votes	%
Robert Wisdom (re-elected)	283	50.9
Archibald Jacob	273	49.1
Total formal votes	556	100.0
Informal votes	0	0.0
Turnout	556	70.5

=== Monara ===
1864–65 New South Wales colonial election: Monara Saturday 24 December 1864
Candidate	Votes	%
James Martin (elected)	333	50.8
William Grahame	227	34.6
William Brodribb	96	14.6
Total formal votes	656	100.0
Informal votes	0	0.0
Turnout	655	46.3

=== Morpeth ===
1864–65 New South Wales colonial election: Morpeth Tuesday 13 December 1864
Candidate	Votes	%
James Campbell (elected)	315	59.8
John Keating	212	40.2
Total formal votes	527	100.0
Informal votes	0	0.0
Turnout	527	61.1

=== Mudgee ===
1864–65 New South Wales colonial election: Mudgee Saturday 24 December 1864
Candidate	Votes	%
Samuel Terry (re-elected)	583	57.1
Joseph Innes	438	42.9
Total formal votes	1,021	100.0
Informal votes	0	0.0
Turnout	1,021	52.6

=== The Murray ===
1864–65 New South Wales colonial election: The Murray Saturday 24 December 1864
Candidate	Votes	%
Robert Landale (elected)	unopposed	

=== The Murrumbidgee ===
1864–65 New South Wales colonial election: The Murrumbidgee Saturday 24 December 1864
Candidate	Votes	%
William Macleay (re-elected)	unopposed	

=== Narellan ===
1864–65 New South Wales colonial election: Narellan Saturday 17 December 1864
Candidate	Votes	%
John Hurley (elected)	259	55.0
Joseph Leary (defeated)	212	45.0
Total formal votes	471	98.7
Informal votes	6	1.3
Turnout	477	67.0

=== The Nepean ===
1864–65 New South Wales colonial election: The Nepean Saturday 10 December 1864
Candidate	Votes	%
James Ryan (re-elected)	408	54.0
Thomas Shepherd	345	45.6
William Cover	2	0.3
George Sanders	1	0.1
Total formal votes	756	100.0
Informal votes	0	0.0
Turnout	754	62.7

=== New England ===
1864–65 New South Wales colonial election: New England Saturday 24 December 1864
Candidate	Votes	%
Theophilus Cooper (elected)	559	53.7
Robert Forster (defeated)	482	46.3
Total formal votes	1,041	100.0
Informal votes	0	0.0
Turnout	1,041	60.8

=== Newcastle ===
1864–65 New South Wales colonial election: Newcastle Thursday 22 December 1864
Candidate	Votes	%
James Hannell (re-elected)	294	43.6
William Brookes	207	30.7
Charles Bolton	166	24.6
Thomas Adam	7	1.0
Total formal votes	674	96.8
Informal votes	22	3.2
Turnout	696	69.9

=== Newtown ===
1864–65 New South Wales colonial election: Newtown Wednesday 7 December 1864
Candidate	Votes	%
Stephen Brown (elected)	unopposed	

=== Northumberland ===
1864–65 New South Wales colonial election: Northumberland Saturday 24 December 1864
Candidate	Votes	%
Atkinson Tighe (re-elected)	630	62.1
William Brookes	384	37.9
Total formal votes	1,014	96.7
Informal votes	35	3.3
Turnout	1,049	57.2

=== Orange ===
1864–65 New South Wales colonial election: Orange Saturday 17 December 1864
Candidate	Votes	%
William Forlonge (elected)	unopposed	

=== Paddington ===
1864–65 New South Wales colonial election: Paddington Wednesday 23 November 1864
Candidate	Votes	%
John Sutherland (re-elected)	650	67.9
Henry Mort	307	32.1
Total formal votes	957	100.0
Informal votes	0	0.0
Turnout	957	51.4

=== Parramatta ===
1864–65 New South Wales colonial election: Parramatta Thursday 24 November 1864
Candidate	Votes	%
James Byrnes (elected 1)	354	28.8
James Farnell (elected 2)	342	27.8
John Lackey (defeated)	272	22.1
Arthur Holroyd (defeated)	247	20.1
Frederick Birmingham	16	1.3
Total formal votes	1,231	100.0
Informal votes	0	0.0
Turnout	636	51.5

=== The Paterson ===
1864–65 New South Wales colonial election: The Paterson Wednesday 14 December 1864
Candidate	Votes	%
William Arnold (re-elected)	217	62.0
Geoffrey Eagar	133	38.0
Total formal votes	350	100.0
Informal votes	0	0.0
Turnout	350	65.3

=== Patrick's Plains ===
1864–65 New South Wales colonial election: Patrick's Plains Friday 9 December 1864
Candidate	Votes	%
Bowie Wilson (re-elected)	314	56.3
John Waller	244	43.7
Total formal votes	558	100.0
Informal votes	0	0.0
Turnout	579	37.8

=== Queanbeyan ===
1864–65 New South Wales colonial election: Queanbeyan Saturday 17 December 1864
Candidate	Votes	%
Leopold De Salis (elected)	297	52.3
Charles Campbell	173	30.5
Abraham Levy	98	17.3
Total formal votes	568	100.0
Informal votes	0	0.0
Turnout	571	54.7

=== Shoalhaven ===
1864–65 New South Wales colonial election: Shoalhaven Wednesday 21 December 1864
Candidate	Votes	%
Thomas Garrett (re-elected)	472	52.6
Richard Kemp	350	39.0
R Seccombe	76	8.5
Total formal votes	898	100.0
Informal votes	0	0.0
Turnout	923	70.4

=== St Leonards ===
1864–65 New South Wales colonial election: St Leonards Wednesday 7 December 1864
Candidate	Votes	%
William Tunks (elected)	591	51.8
Edward Sayers	550	48.2
Total formal votes	1,141	100.0
Informal votes	0	0.0
Turnout	1,141	57.2

=== Tenterfield ===
1864–65 New South Wales colonial election: Tenterfield Saturday 24 December 1864
Candidate	Votes	%
Hugh Gordon (re-elected)	290	52.6
Peel Raymond	261	47.4
Total formal votes	551	100.0
Informal votes	0	0.0
Turnout	551	58.7

=== The Tumut ===
1864–65 New South Wales colonial election: The Tumut Saturday 10 December 1864
Candidate	Votes	%
Charles Cowper Jr. (re-elected)	414	54.4
James Martin	347	45.6
Total formal votes	761	100.0
Informal votes	0	0.0
Turnout	761	62.6

=== The Upper Hunter ===
1864–65 New South Wales colonial election: The Upper Hunter Thursday 15 December 1864
Candidate	Votes	%
James White (elected)	601	65.2
Thomas Dangar (defeated)	283	30.7
William Gordon	38	4.1
Total formal votes	922	100.0
Informal votes	0	0.0
Turnout	922	54.9

=== Wellington ===
1864–65 New South Wales colonial election: Wellington Wednesday 21 December 1864
Candidate	Votes	%
Saul Samuel (re-elected)	345	66.4
James Martin	175	33.7
Total formal votes	520	100.0
Informal votes	0	0.0
Turnout	520	33.5

=== West Macquarie ===
1864–65 New South Wales colonial election: West Macquarie Saturday 24 December 1864
Candidate	Votes	%
Richard Driver (re-elected)	unopposed	

=== West Maitland ===
1864–65 New South Wales colonial election: West Maitland Tuesday 13 December 1864
Candidate	Votes	%
Benjamin Lee (elected)	444	50.9
Peter Green	328	37.6
Andrew Liddell	100	11.5
George Rochester	1	0.1
Total formal votes	873	97.9
Informal votes	19	2.1
Turnout	891	71.5

=== West Sydney ===
1864–65 New South Wales colonial election: West Sydney Thursday 24 November 1864
Candidate	Votes	%
John Robertson (re-elected 1)	2,270	18.3
John Lang (re-elected 2)	2,248	18.1
Samuel Joseph (elected 3)	2,183	17.6
John Darvall (re-elected 4)	2,012	16.2
Geoffrey Eagar (defeated)	1,473	11.9
Daniel Dalgleish (defeated)	1,187	9.6
William Love (defeated)	662	5.3
James Murphy	373	3.0
Total formal votes	12,408	100.0
Informal votes	0	0.0
Turnout	4,056	54.9

=== The Williams ===
1864–65 New South Wales colonial election: The Williams Thursday 8 December 1864
Candidate	Votes	%
Marshall Burdekin (re-elected)	293	50.3
Frederick Manton	177	30.4
William Allen (defeated)	112	19.2
J West	0	0.0
Total formal votes	582	100.0
Informal votes	0	0.0
Turnout	578	58.1

William Allen was the sitting member. Marshall Burdekin was the sitting member for Liverpool Plains

=== Windsor ===
1864–65 New South Wales colonial election: Windsor Thursday 24 November 1864
Candidate	Votes	%
William Walker (re-elected)	228	50.9
George Pitt	220	49.1
Total formal votes	448	100.0
Informal votes	0	0.0
Turnout	450	68.8

=== Wollombi ===
1864–65 New South Wales colonial election: Wollombi Tuesday 13 December 1864
Candidate	Votes	%
Joseph Eckford (re-elected)	338	53.7
Lyall Scott	292	46.4
Total formal votes	630	100.0
Informal votes	0	0.0
Turnout	630	58.2

=== Yass Plains ===
1864–65 New South Wales colonial election: Yass Plains Tuesday 20 December 1864
Candidate	Votes	%
Peter Faucett (re-elected)	480	71.0
William Harbottle	196	29.0
Total formal votes	676	100.0
Informal votes	0	0.0
Turnout	676	55.5

== See also ==
- Candidates of the 1864–65 New South Wales colonial election
- Members of the New South Wales Legislative Assembly, 1864–1869
