= Electoral results for the district of Goldfields West =

Election results for Goldfields West, New South Wales, Australia

Goldfields West, an electoral district of the Legislative Assembly in the Australian state of New South Wales was created in 1859 and abolished in 1880.

Election	Member	Party
1859	Robert Wisdom	None
1860	Robert Wisdom	None
1865	Stephen Donnelly	None
1867 by	George Thornton	None
1869 by	Walter Church	None
1870	Walter Church	None
1872	David Buchanan	None
1875	David Buchanan	None
1877	Louis Beyers	None

== Election results ==
=== Elections in the 1870s ===
==== 1877 ====
1877 New South Wales colonial election: Goldfields West Monday 12 November
Candidate	Votes	%
Louis Beyers (elected)	476	57.9
David Buchanan (defeated)	346	42.1
Total formal votes	822	97.9
Informal votes	18	2.1
Turnout	840	8.4

==== 1875 ====
1874–75 New South Wales colonial election: Goldfields West Monday 11 January 1875
Candidate	Votes	%
David Buchanan (re-elected)	1,446	89.8
J P Sweeney	164	10.2
Total formal votes	1,610	98.2
Informal votes	30	1.8
Turnout	1,640	8.2

==== 1872 ====
1872 New South Wales colonial election: Goldfields West Monday 25 March
Candidate	Votes	%
David Buchanan (elected)	1,727	45.4
James Plunkett	1,159	30.5
Walter Church (defeated)	710	18.7
Simon Belinfante	209	5.5
Total formal votes	3,805	97.1
Informal votes	114	2.9
Turnout	3,919	24.5

=== Elections in the 1860s ===
==== 1870 ====
1869–70 New South Wales colonial election: Goldfields West Monday 10 January 1870
Candidate	Votes	%
Walter Church (re-elected)	814	64.6
Geoffrey Eagar	389	30.9
William Redman	57	4.5
Total formal votes	1,260	100.0
Informal votes	0	0.0
Turnout	1,276	21.3

==== 1869 by-election ====
1869 Goldfields West by-election Monday 15 February
Candidate	Votes	%
Walter Church (elected)	325	53.0
Charles Blakefield	288	47.0
Total formal votes	613	100.0
Informal votes	0	0.0
Turnout	613	8.8

The by-election was caused by the resignation of George Thornton.

==== 1867 by-election ====
1867 Goldfields West by-election Tuesday 26 February
Candidate	Votes	%
George Thornton (elected)	341	59.4
John Rae	233	40.6
Total formal votes	574	100.0
Informal votes	0	0.0
Turnout	574	9.8

The by-election was caused by the resignation of Stephen Donnelly.

==== 1865 ====
1864–65 New South Wales colonial election: Goldfields West Tuesday 10 January 1865
Candidate	Votes	%
Stephen Donnelly (elected)	unopposed	

==== 1860 ====
1860 New South Wales colonial election: Goldfields West Wednesday 19 December
Candidate	Votes	%
Robert Wisdom (re-elected)	383	96.2
James Farnell (defeated)	15	3.8
Total formal votes	398	100.0
Informal votes	0	0.0
Turnout	398	10.0

James Farnell was the member for St Leonards and also unsuccessfully contested Central Cumberland.

=== Elections in the 1850s ===
==== 1859 ====
1859 New South Wales colonial election: Goldfields West Monday 13 June
Candidate	Votes	%
Robert Wisdom (elected)	show of hands	
William Redman		
