= Electoral results for the district of Lower Hunter =

Election results for state seat of Lower Hunter, New South Wales, Australia

Lower Hunter, an electoral district of the Legislative Assembly in the Australian state of New South Wales was created in 1859 and abolished in 1880.

Period	Member	Party
1859	William Windeyer	None
1860	Alexander Scott	None
1861 by	Richard Sadleir	None
1864	Robert Wisdom	None
1869	Robert Wisdom	None
1872	Archibald Jacob	None
1875	Archibald Jacob	None
1877	Archibald Jacob	None
1877 by	Archibald Jacob	None

== Election results ==
=== Elections in the 1870s ===
==== 1877 by-election ====
1877 Lower Hunter by-election Monday 26 November
Candidate	Votes	%
Archibald Jacob (re-elected)	318	83.7
David Buchanan	62	16.3
Total formal votes	380	96.2
Informal votes	15	3.8
Turnout	395	54.6

Archibald Jacob was appointed Secretary for Mines in the fourth Robertson ministry.

==== 1877 ====
1877 New South Wales colonial election: The Lower Hunter Tuesday 30 October
Candidate	Votes	%
Archibald Jacob (re-elected)	unopposed	

==== 1875 ====
1874–75 New South Wales colonial election: The Lower Hunter Monday 4 January 1875
Candidate	Votes	%
Archibald Jacob (re-elected)	259	53.7
Walter Cooper	219	45.4
Archibald Hamilton	4	0.8
Total formal votes	482	96.8
Informal votes	16	3.2
Turnout	498	75.3

==== 1872 ====
1872 New South Wales colonial election: The Lower Hunter Thursday 7 March
Candidate	Votes	%
Archibald Jacob (elected)	258	50.9
Robert Wisdom (defeated)	249	49.1
Total formal votes	507	100.0
Informal votes	0	0.0
Turnout	520	77.6

=== Elections in the 1860s ===
==== 1869 ====
1869–70 New South Wales colonial election: The Lower Hunter Friday 17 December 1869
Candidate	Votes	%
Robert Wisdom (re-elected)	281	51.4
Archibald Jacob	266	48.6
Total formal votes	547	97.7
Informal votes	13	2.3
Turnout	560	78.3

==== 1864 ====
1864–65 New South Wales colonial election: The Lower Hunter Thursday 8 December 1864
Candidate	Votes	%
Robert Wisdom (re-elected)	283	50.9
Archibald Jacob	273	49.1
Total formal votes	556	100.0
Informal votes	0	0.0
Turnout	556	70.5

==== 1861 by-election ====
1861 Lower Hunter by-election Friday 19 July
Candidate	Votes	%
Richard Sadleir (elected)	319	71.0
Thomas Argent	130	29.0
Total formal votes	449	100.0
Informal votes	0	0.0
Turnout	449	52.1

Alexander Scott resigned to be appointed to the Legislative Council.

==== 1860 ====
1860 New South Wales colonial election: The Lower Hunter Saturday 15 December
Candidate	Votes	%
Alexander Scott (elected)	238	51.5
Richard Sadlier	224	48.5
Total formal votes	462	100.0
Informal votes	0	0.0
Turnout	462	56.3

=== Elections in the 1850s ===
==== 1859 ====
1859 New South Wales colonial election: The Lower Hunter Wednesday 29 June
Candidate	Votes	%
William Windeyer (elected)	316	72.6
James Williamson	119	27.4
Total formal votes	435	100.0
Informal votes	0	0.0
Turnout	435	64.1
