= List of mayors of Balmain =

People who served as the mayor of the Municipality of Balmain are:

Rev. Ralph Mansfield (1799–1880), first Chairman of the Balmain Municipality.

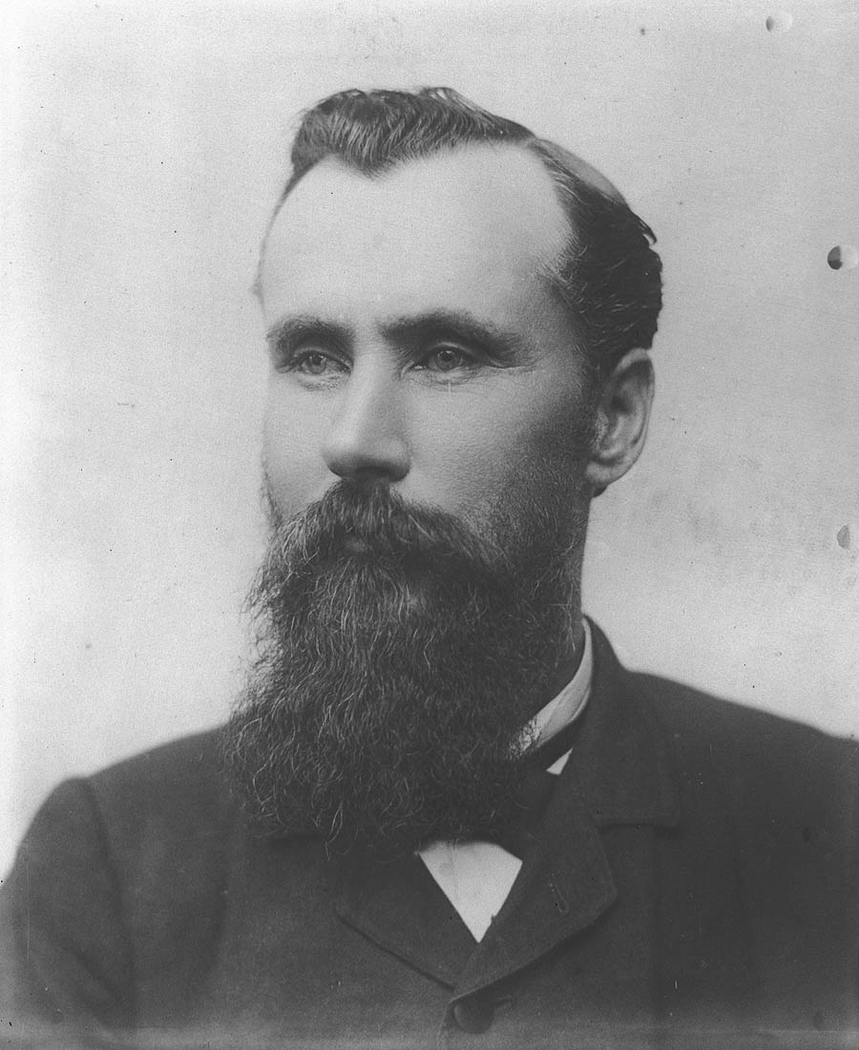
Hon. Jacob Garrard (1846–1931), Mayor 1885–1886, Secretary for Public Works 1885–1886, Minister for Public Instruction 1894–1898.

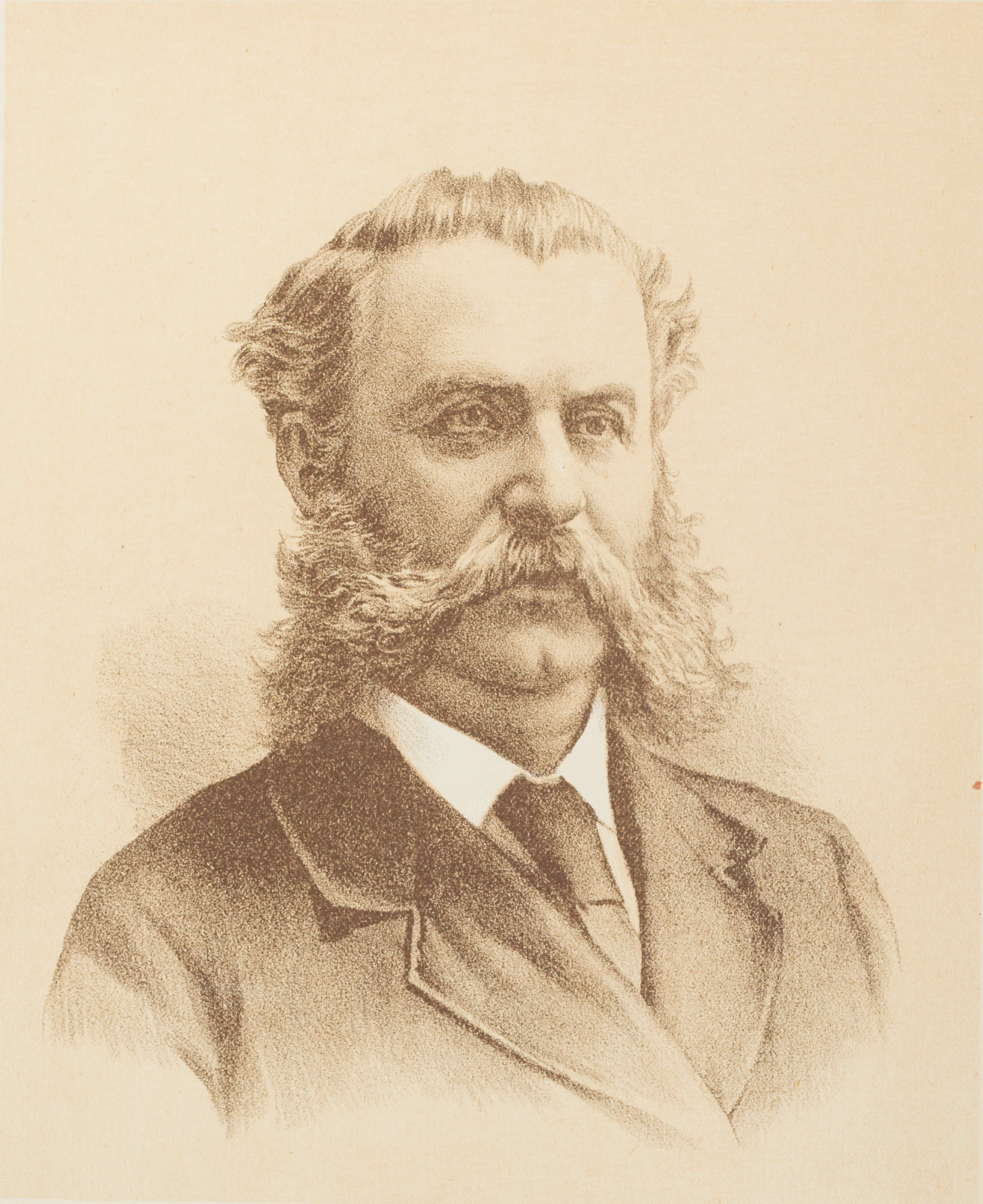
Frederick Trouton (1826–1896), Mayor 1873-1874

Years	Chairman	Notes
5 April 1860 – February 1861	Ralph Mansfield	
February 1861 – February 1862	George Elliott	
February 1862 – February 1863	Nicol Stenhouse	
February 1863 – February 1864	Walter Church	
February 1864 – 1864	Thomas Rowntree	
1864 – February 1865	Owen Evans	
February 1865 – February 1866	Ralph Mansfield	
February 1866 – 15 February 1867	Walter Church	
15 February 1867 – 23 December 1867	John Booth	
Years	Mayors	
23 December 1867 – 6 February 1868	John Booth	
6 February 1868 – February 1869	Henry Perdriau	
February 1869 – February 1870	Frederick Robinson	
February 1870 – 15 February 1871	Josiah Mullens	
15 February 1871 – 15 February 1872	Thomas Rowntree	
15 February 1872 – 1872	George Elliott	
1872 – 12 February 1873	Henry Perdriau	
12 February 1873 – 21 March 1873	Charles Mossman	
25 March 1873 – 10 February 1874	Frederick Trouton	
10 February 1874 – 10 February 1875	John Taylor	
10 February 1875 – 8 February 1876	Henry Perdriau	
8 February 1876 – 15 February 1877	Solomon Hyam	
15 February 1877 – 15 February 1878	John Taylor	
15 February 1878 – 11 February 1880	James McDonald	
11 February 1880 – February 1881	Albert Elkington	
February 1881 – 12 February 1883	William Alston Hutchinson	
12 February 1883 – 11 February 1885	James Cameron	
11 February 1885 – 8 February 1886	Jacob Garrard	
8 February 1886 – 16 February 1887	John Greenway Punch	
16 February 1887 – 28 February 1888	William Moffit Burns	
28 February 1888 – 7 January 1890	Edward Harman Buchanan	
7 January 1890 – 20 February 1890	James McDonald (acting)	
20 February 1890 – 10 March 1891	George Clubb	
10 March 1891 – 11 February 1892	James Brodie	
11 February 1892 – 2 November 1893	James Wheeler	
2 November 1893 – 8 March 1895	Henry Swan	
8 March 1895 – 16 February 1897	Alexander Martin Milne	
16 February 1897 – 17 February 1899	Gilbert Curtis Murdoch	
17 February 1899 – 14 February 1901	Henry Mills	
14 February 1901 – 14 February 1902	Alexander Martin Milne	
14 February 1902 – February 1903	Harry Cox	
February 1903 – 18 February 1905	Alfred Crump	
18 February 1905 – 1 March 1908	Matthew Henry Cohen	
1 March 1908 – February 1909	William John Laws	
February 1909 – 1 June 1909	Thomas Minty	
June 1909 – February 1911	Alfred Crump	
February 1911 – February 1912	Matthew Henry Cohen	
February 1912 – February 1914	George Clubb	
February 1914 – 3 February 1916	Henry Swan	
3 February 1916 – February 1918	Henry Scott	
February 1918 – February 1920	Donald McKenzie	
February 1920 – February 1922	Reginald Thornton	
February 1922 – February 1923	William Wainwright	
February 1923 – February 1924	Bertie Wheeler (ALP)	
February 1924 – February 1925	George Mullins (ALP)	
February 1925 – February 1926	Thomas Harrington (ALP)	
February 1926 – February 1929	Reginald Thornton	
February 1929 – January 1932	Lyle Swan	
January 1932 – December 1932	Reginald Thornton	
December 1932 – 1935	Gilbert Storey (ALP)	
1935 – 1936	Cecil Stapleton	
1936 – 1936	John Waite	
December 1936 – 1938	Michael Cashman (ALP)	
1938 – 1939	Robert Brownlee (Lang Labor)	
1939 – 1940	Herman Angelini (Lang Labor)	
1940 – 1941	John Waite	
1941 – January 1942	Michael Cashman (ALP)	
January 1942 – 9 November 1942	Michael Hubert McMahon (ALP)	
November 1942 – December 1943	Robert Brownlee (ALP)	
December 1943 – December 1944	George Harris	
December 1944 – December 1945	Edward Erwin (ALP)	
December 1945 – December 1946	Gilbert Lockhart	
December 1946 – 11 December 1947	Charles Laggan	
11 December 1947 – 31 December 1948	Richard O'Connor (ALP)	
