= Electoral results for the district of Goldfields North =

Election results for Goldfields North, New South Wales, Australia

Goldfields North, an electoral district of the Legislative Assembly in the Australian state of New South Wales was created in 1859 and abolished in 1880.

Election	Member	Party
1859	James Hoskins	None
1860	James Hoskins	None
1863 by	James Buchanan	None
1865	George Pickering	None
1868 by	James Hoskins	None
1870	Robert Wisdom	None
1870 by	Robert Forster	None
1872	James Rodd	None
1875	Robert Forster	None
1877	Henry Copeland	None

== Election results ==
=== Elections in the 1870s ===
==== 1877 ====
1877 New South Wales colonial election: Goldfields North Monday 12 November
Candidate	Votes	%
Henry Copeland (elected)	unopposed	

==== 1875 ====
1874–75 New South Wales colonial election: Goldfields North Monday 11 January 1875
Candidate	Votes	%
Robert Forster (elected)	497	84.8
Thomas Browne	89	15.2
Total formal votes	586	100.0
Informal votes	0	0.0
Turnout	586	78.1

==== 1872 ====
1872 New South Wales colonial election: Goldfields North Monday 25 March
Candidate	Votes	%
James Rodd (elected)	252	51.0
Robert Forster (defeated)	213	43.1
Charles Carey	29	5.9
Total formal votes	494	100.0
Informal votes	0	0.0
Turnout	494	32.9

=== Elections in the 1860s ===
==== 1870 by-election ====
1870 Goldfields North by-election Monday 18 April
Candidate	Votes	%
Robert Forster (elected)	249	57.8
John Burns	182	42.2
Total formal votes	431	100.0
Informal votes	0	0.0
Turnout	431	50.7

Robert Wisdom was also elected to Lower Hunter and chose to resign from Goldfields North.

==== 1870 ====
1869–70 New South Wales colonial election: Goldfields North Monday 10 January 1870
Candidate	Votes	%
Robert Wisdom (elected)	212	54.6
William Bourke	145	37.4
Henry Roman	31	8.0
Total formal votes	388	100.0
Informal votes	0	0.0
Turnout	390	45.9

==== 1868 by-election ====
1868 Goldfields North by-election Monday 6 July
Candidate	Votes	%
James Hoskins (elected)	223	68.0
William Gordon	59	18.0
William Hanson	46	14.0
Total formal votes	328	100.0
Informal votes	0	0.0
Turnout	328	46.9

The by-election was caused by the resignation of George Pickering.

==== 1865 ====
1864–65 New South Wales colonial election: Goldfields North Tuesday 10 January 1865
Candidate	Votes	%
George Pickering (elected)	269	71.0
Thomas Rusden	87	23.0
Henry Roman	23	6.1
Total formal votes	379	100.0
Informal votes	0	0.0
Turnout	379	58.3

==== 1863 by-election ====
1863 Goldfields North by-election Tuesday 7 April
Candidate	Votes	%
James Buchanan (elected)	319	59.4
James Macnamara	218	40.6
Total formal votes	537	100.0
Informal votes	0	0.0
Turnout	537	44.8

James Hoskins resigned.

==== 1860 ====
1860 New South Wales colonial election: Goldfields North Wednesday 19 December
Candidate	Votes	%
James Hoskins (re-elected)	unopposed	

=== Elections in the 1850s ===
==== 1859 ====
1859 New South Wales colonial election: Goldfields North Wednesday 6 July
Candidate	Votes	%
James Hoskins (elected)	122	56.2
James Macnamara	90	41.5
Edward Hargraves	5	2.3
Total formal votes	217	100.0
Informal votes	0	0.0
Turnout	222	9.3
