= 1870 Goldfields North colonial by-election =

By-election in New South Wales, Australia

A by-election was held for the New South Wales Legislative Assembly electorate of Goldfields North on 23 February 1870 because Robert Wisdom had also been elected to Lower Hunter and chose to resign from Goldfields North.

== Dates ==
Date	Event
1 March 1870	Robert Wisdom resigned.
19 March 1870	Writ of election issued by the Speaker of the Legislative Assembly.
4 April 1870	Nominations
18 April 1870	Polling day
30 April 1870	Return of writ

== Result ==
1870 Goldfields North by-election Monday 18 April
Candidate	Votes	%
Robert Forster (elected)	249	57.8
John Burns	182	42.2
Total formal votes	431	100.0
Informal votes	0	0.0
Turnout	431	50.7

== See also ==
- Electoral results for the district of Goldfields North
- List of New South Wales state by-elections
