= 1861 Lower Hunter colonial by-election =

By-election in New South Wales, Australia

A by-election was held for the New South Wales Legislative Assembly electorate of Lower Hunter on 19 July 1861 because of the resignation of Alexander Scott to accept an appointment to the Legislative Council.

== Dates ==
Date	Event
22 June 1861	Alexander Scott resigned.
29 June 1861	Writ of election issued by the Speaker of the Legislative Assembly.
16 July 1861	Nominations at Raymond Terrace.
19 July 1861	Polling day.
31 July 1861	Return of writ

== Polling places ==
- Raymond Terrace
- Seaham
- Miller's Forest
- Cabbage Tree

== Result ==
1861 Lower Hunter by-election Friday 19 July
Candidate	Votes	%
Richard Sadleir (elected)	319	71.0
Thomas Argent	130	29.0
Total formal votes	449	100.0
Informal votes	0	0.0
Turnout	449	52.1

== See also ==
- Electoral results for the district of Lower Hunter
- List of New South Wales state by-elections
