= 1867 Goldfields West colonial by-election =

By-election in New South Wales, Australia

A by-election was held for the New South Wales Legislative Assembly electorate of Goldfields West on 26 February 1867 because of the resignation of Stephen Donnelly.

== Dates ==
Date	Event
29 Dec 1866	Stephen Donnelly resigned.
5 January 1867	Writ of election issued by the Speaker of the Legislative Assembly.
29 January 1867	Nominations at Sofala
26 February 1867	Polling day
26 March 1867	Return of writ

== Result ==
1867 Goldfields West by-election Tuesday 26 February
Candidate	Votes	%
George Thornton (elected)	341	59.4
John Rae	233	40.6
Total formal votes	574	100.0
Informal votes	0	0.0
Turnout	574	9.8

== See also ==
- Electoral results for the district of Goldfields West
- List of New South Wales state by-elections
