= 1877 Lower Hunter colonial by-election =

By-election in New South Wales, Australia

A by-election was held for the New South Wales Legislative Assembly electorate of Lower Hunter on 26 November 1877 because Archibald Jacob was appointed Secretary for Mines in the fourth Robertson ministry. Jacob had been unopposed at the election in October 1877, and ministerial by-elections were usually uncontested.

== Dates ==
Date	Event
26 October 1877	Archibald Jacob re-elected unopposed for The Lower Hunter.
12 November 1877	David Buchanan defeated for his seat of Goldfields West.
20 November 1877	Archibald Jacob appointed Secretary for Mines. Writ of election issued by the Governor. (Note: Ordinarily the writ for a by-election would be issued by the Speaker of the Legislative Assembly, however Jacob was appointed before Parliament convened and the writ was issued by the Governor.)
23 November 1877	Nominations
26 November 1877	Polling day
27 November 1877	Return of writ

== Result ==
1877 Lower Hunter by-election Monday 26 November
Candidate	Votes	%
Archibald Jacob (re-elected)	318	83.7
David Buchanan	62	16.3
Total formal votes	380	96.2
Informal votes	15	3.8
Turnout	395	54.6

== See also ==
- Electoral results for the district of Lower Hunter
- List of New South Wales state by-elections
