= 1869 Goldfields West colonial by-election =

By-election in New South Wales, Australia

A by-election was held for the New South Wales Legislative Assembly electorate of Goldfields West on 15 February 1869 because of the resignation of George Thornton to visit England.

== Dates ==
Date	Event
31 December 1868	George Thornton resigned.
6 January 1869	Writ of election issued by the Speaker of the Legislative Assembly.
25 January 1869	Nominations at Sofala
15 February 1869	Polling day
1 March 1869	Return of writ

== Result ==
1869 Goldfields West by-election Monday 15 February
Candidate	Votes	%
Walter Church (elected)	325	53.0
Charles Blakefield	288	47.0
Total formal votes	613	100.0
Informal votes	0	0.0
Turnout	613	8.8

== See also ==
- Electoral results for the district of Goldfields West
- List of New South Wales state by-elections
