= Australian Magazine =

Australian Magazine may refer to:

- The Australian Magazine; or, Compendium of Religious, Literary, and Miscellaneous Intelligence, the first Australian periodical
- See also The Australian
