= Emma Macpherson =

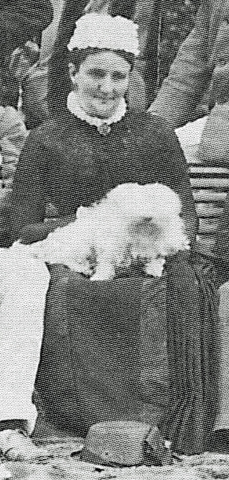
Emma Macpherson at Blairgowrie Scotland in 1884

Emma McPherson (1833 – 1915), also known as Mrs Allan Macpherson, was a writer and watercolour artist, was the daughter of Charles Henry Blake and his wife Frances.

In 1853 Emma married Allan Macpherson of Blairgowrie, Scotland. Allan was born in Scotland. In 1829, as a boy, he travelled to Sydney, Australia with his parents, where he attended Cape's School. Later he purchased the properties Keera, near Bingara, New South Wales and Mount Abundance, near what is now Roma, Queensland. He returned to Blairgowrie in 1850.

In 1854 Emma gave birth to her first child, Jessie and in 1855 a boy, William Charles, was born. About this time, Allan felt the need to return to Australia to sell property which he owned. Emma decided to accompany him, so baby William was left in the care of Emma's aunt, so that she could travel with her husband. They took Jessie with them.

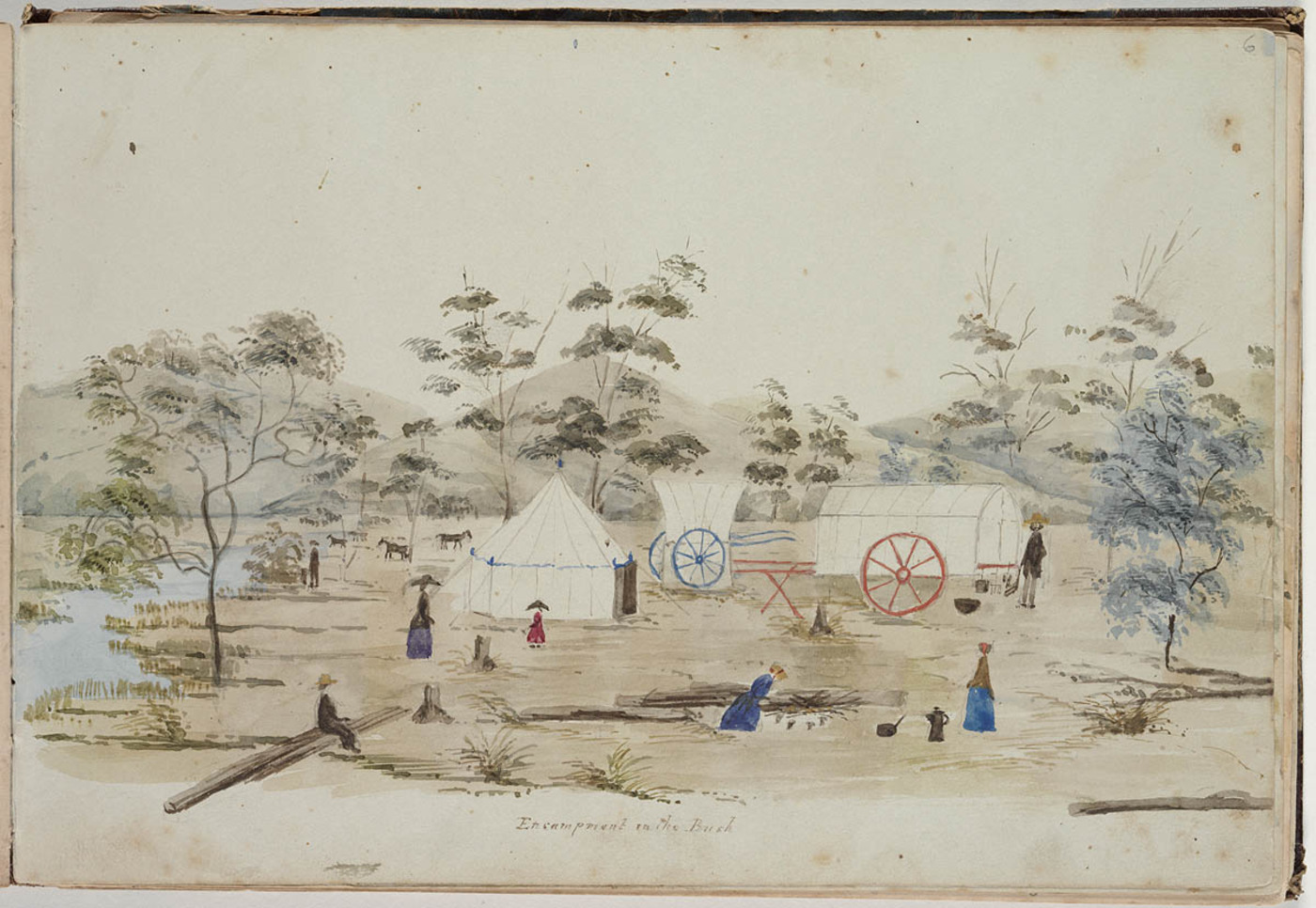
An encampment in the bush.

After some time in Sydney, where Macpherson's father William Macpherson was employed, Allan, Emma and Jessie travelled by coastal steamer to Morpeth, New South Wales and, from there, travelled by road to Keera in a covered wagon, which they had arranged to be constructed for them.

Emma McPherson wrote a book about her time in Australia titled, My Experiences in Australia: Being Recollections of a Visit to the Australian Colonies in 1856-7. She also painted scenes of some of the places visited during their journey to Keera and back, as well as other scenes around Sydney and elsewhere in Australia. Following the family's return to Sydney they returned to Blairgowrie in 1857.

The Macphersons returned to Sydney in 1862 and remained until 1868, when they once more returned to Blairgowrie.

Emma and Allan Macpherson had seven children, five sons and two daughters: Jessie, William Charles, Alan, Charles, George, Ewan and Frances. George Macpherson was killed in 1915, during World War I, a few months before Emma's death.

Emma Macpherson's obituary noted that "many local institutions have been favoured with her patronage for long years, including the Choral Society, Horticultural Society, Bowling Club, Curling Club etc.: and the young people of the town and district have good cause to remember her for her generosity in providing accommodation in her policies for picnics and gala days. Nothing pleased her better than to see the children enjoy themselves, and to endeavour to make others happy."

Oona Blake (1893-1969), daughter of Allan and Emma Macpherson's fifth son Ewan, donated Emma's album of paintings to the State Library of New South Wales.

Sir William Macpherson of Cluny, a Scottish High Court judge is a great-grandson of Allan and Emma Macpherson.
