= Thomas Pearce (priest) =

- Born: 1820
- Died: September 24, 1885 (aged 64–65)
- Occupations: Writer, Clergyman

Thomas Pearce (1820–1885) was an English clergyman, known under the pseudonym "Idstone" as an author on dogs.

== Life ==
He was born at Hatford, the son of Francis Joseph Pearce, a clergyman who died when he was aged two, and his wife Mary Ann Rickards. He then moved to be with her, in Leicestershire.

Thomas Pearce matriculated at Lincoln College, Oxford in June 1838, as did his elder brother Francis Joseph at Exeter College. The family moved to Oxford at this period. Thomas graduated B.A. in 1843, and M.A. in 1849.

Ordained in the Church of England in 1845, Pearce then held a number of curacies in southern England. He was in 1845 at Goldenhill; in 1847 at Highcliffe; in 1851 at Waterperry; and in 1852 in Sparsholt, which was at that time in Berkshire.

Pearce became vicar of Morden, Dorset in 1853. He was also rector of Charborough from 1871. He died on 24 September 1885. His interests including breeding champion setters, shooting snipe, and collecting birds.

== Works ==
Pearce wrote articles for The Field, from 1865. His works included:

- The Dog: with directions for his treatment (1872)
- The Idstone Papers (1872)

The compilation The Dogs of the British Islands (1866) was mostly from Pearce's work. The pseudonym Idstone, from a hamlet now in Oxfordshire, is connected to Pearce family properties that lay in the civil parish of Ashbury, Oxfordshire. It was a pen name, published in lists of related sporting authors.

== Family ==
Pearce married on 14 July 1852 Fanny Georgina Blake. Her father Charles Henry Blake (1794–1872), born in Calcutta and in early life an indigo planter, became a property speculator in London. They had three sons and a daughter:

1. Frank Charles born 1853. He became a colleague of John Henry Walsh ("Stonehenge") on the staff of The Field, and Sewallis Shirley, founder of The Kennel Club, chose him, to edit the initial Kennel Club Stud Book of 1874.
2. Evelyn Thomas (c.1855–1894), became an indigo planter in Bihar, then a tea planter in Checher and Sylhet.
3. Ethel Katharine (1856–1940), who spent time a journalist, and is known as an authority on Dorset heathland flies, through her series of books Typical Flies of the 1920s illustrated with her own photographs.
4. Nigel Douglas Frith (1862–1939).
