= 1863 Central Cumberland colonial by-election =

By-election in New South Wales, Australia

A by-election was held for the New South Wales Legislative Assembly electorate of Central Cumberland on 6 June 1863 because of the resignation of James Atkinson due to insolvency, who then re-contested the seat.

== Dates ==
Date	Event
3 April 1863	James Atkinson declared insolvent.
14 April 1863	James Atkinson resigned.
29 April 1863	Writ of election issued by the Speaker of the Legislative Assembly.
3 June 1863	Nominations
6 June 1863	Polling day
15 June 1863	Return of writ

== Result ==
1863 Central Cumberland by-election Saturday 6 June
Candidate	Votes	%
Allan Macpherson (elected)	586	53.3
James Atkinson (defeated)	514	46.7
Total formal votes	1,100	100.0
Informal votes	0	0.0
Turnout	1,100	50.1

== See also ==
- Electoral results for the district of Central Cumberland
- List of New South Wales state by-elections
