= Ythsie =

Hamlet in Aberdeenshire, Scotland

Coordinates: 57.367°N 2.190°W

Ythsie: Scottish Gaelic: Suidhe Chuith (place near a fold)
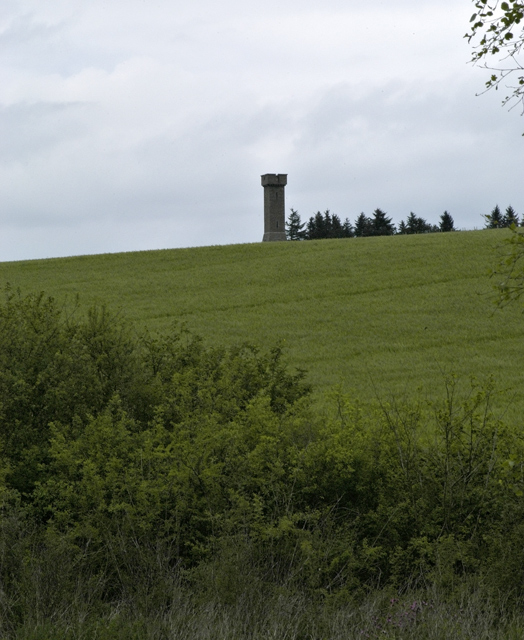
- The Prop of Ythsie, tower on Hill of Ythsie north of the hamlet

- Location within Aberdeenshire
- Council area: Aberdeenshire
- Country: Scotland
- Sovereign state: United Kingdom
- Police: Scotland
- Fire: Scottish
- Ambulance: Scottish

Ythsie (pronounced ‘icy’) is a hamlet in Aberdeenshire, Scotland, about one mile east of Tarves.

To the north of the hamlet, on the Hill of Ythsie, is a tower called the Prop of Ythsie. It was built in 1861-1862 to commemorate George Hamilton-Gordon, 4th Earl of Aberdeen, and is a grade C(S) listed building. The money to pay for the building work was raised by tenants from his Haddo Estate.

North Ythsie Farmhouse is grade B listed, and South Ythsie Farmhouse is grade C(S) listed.

Australian politician John Hay (1816-1892) was born at Little Ythsie, which lies to the east of the hamlet.
