= Charles Henry Blake =

Charles Henry Blake (1794–1872) was a British indigo planter and industrialist in India, who became a property developer and railway company director in London.

== Early life ==
He was the son of Benjamin Blake, a sea captain turned indigo planter in Bengal. He spent time in the United Kingdom in the 1820s. From around 1830 to the early 1840s, he prospered as a sugar and rum manufacturer in India.

== Property developer ==
During the 1850s, Blake was involved in developing the Ladbroke Estate, where he bought speculatively into land holdings from 1850, later acquiring other land on Lansdowne Hill. In 1852 he was living at 15 Devonshire Place, and was a director of the Portsmouth Railway Company.

The solicitor Richard Roy was active in legal work on the Estate. Blake had Samuel Walker as partner. Employing capital from his Indian ventures, Blake bought land in London's Notting Hill neighbourhood. He survived financial overstretch to build extensively there, in the Kensington Park area. Over the period 1850 to 1853, the area east of Ladbroke Grove was developed quickly for housing by a group including Blake and Walker, Roy acting for them, Felix Ladbroke and the architect Thomas Allom. Blake and Allom were responsible for the houses (now consecutive nos. 24 to 33) on the north side of Kensington Park Gardens, Blake himself living at no. 24 during most of the 1850s.

Blake made little or nothing on his initial property investments, handled to begin with through his solicitor; and he took losses on railway speculation in 1854–5. He survived the property market upheavals of the late 1850s, though selling his Kensington Park Gardens house to tide himself over. He ultimately prospered in the 1860s by exploiting the opportunity of the new Hammersmith & City line, in which he invested and acted as a director. Questionable land dealings saw him pushed out of the railway company, but from 1864 his developer activities between the railway and Kensal Green thrived.

== Family ==
Blake's widow Frances ran the Estate for some years after his death, to her own death in 1876. They had two sons and two daughters:

- Charles Henry Blake (1835–1895), the elder son, a barrister, married in 1862 Josephine, daughter of Edward Amos Chaplin, and lived at Glendelvine, Dunkeld. He took over the management of the Estate.
- George Denis Blake (born 1839).
- Fanny Georgina, who married in 1852 Thomas Pearce.
- Emma, the younger daughter, married in 1853 Allan Macpherson of Blairgowrie. She is known as a watercolour artist, for landscapes painted in Australia during a year-long visit by the couple, some three years after the marriage.
