= Nicol Stenhouse =

Australian lawyer

Nicol Drysdale Stenhouse (27 June 1806 – 18 February 1873) was a Scottish-born lawyer, writer and literary patron in colonial Australia.

== Biography ==
Stenhouse was born in Coldstream, Berwickshire, Scotland and went on to become a lawyer and a great lover of literature. He was clerk to Sir William Hamilton, 9th Baronet when the latter was practising as an advocate in Edinburgh. He was also a friend of Thomas De Quincey. Other associates in Edinburgh include Professor John Wilson and Professor Patrick Campbell MacDougall.

He emigrated to New South Wales, arriving in October 1839, and practised for many years as an attorney and solicitor in Sydney. He was a patron and mentor to many needy and struggling literary men in Sydney. Among the writers he assisted with money, encouragement, the loan of books from his large library and in other ways were Daniel Deniehy, Richard Rowe, Frank Fowler, Charles Harpur and Henry Kendall.

He was on the committee of the Sydney Mechanic's School of Arts (1855–73) and served as its president (1867–73), a committee-man on the Australian Library and Literary Institution (1857–69) and on the Balmain Municipal Council and was appointed its chairman in 1862. Not long before his death he was, on the motion of Dr. Charles Badham, appointed an examiner in the Faculty of Law and a member of the senate of the University of Sydney. He succeeded Dr. John Woolley as president of the Sydney Mechanics' School of Arts, and held the position from 1867 to 1873. Stenhouse died on 18 February 1873 in Balmain, New South Wales. He was survived by his wife, Margaretta, who he had married in Sydney in 1846, five daughters and two sons.

Civic offices
Preceded by George Elliott	Chairman of the Balmain Municipal Council; 1862 – 1863	Succeeded by Walter Church
