= 1868 Goldfields North colonial by-election =

By-election in New South Wales, Australia

A by-election was held for the New South Wales Legislative Assembly electorate of Goldfields North on 17 December 1868 because of the resignation of George Pickering.

== Dates ==
Date	Event
7 May 1868	George Pickering resigned.
27 May 1868	Writ of election issued by the Speaker of the Legislative Assembly.
22 June 1868	Nominations
6 July 1868	Polling day
31 July 1868	Return of writ

== Result ==
1868 Goldfields North by-election Monday 6 July
Candidate	Votes	%
James Hoskins (elected)	223	68.0
William Gordon	59	18.0
William Hanson	46	14.0
Total formal votes	328	100.0
Informal votes	0	0.0
Turnout	328	46.9

== See also ==
- Electoral results for the district of Goldfields North
- List of New South Wales state by-elections
