= William Macpherson (civil servant) =

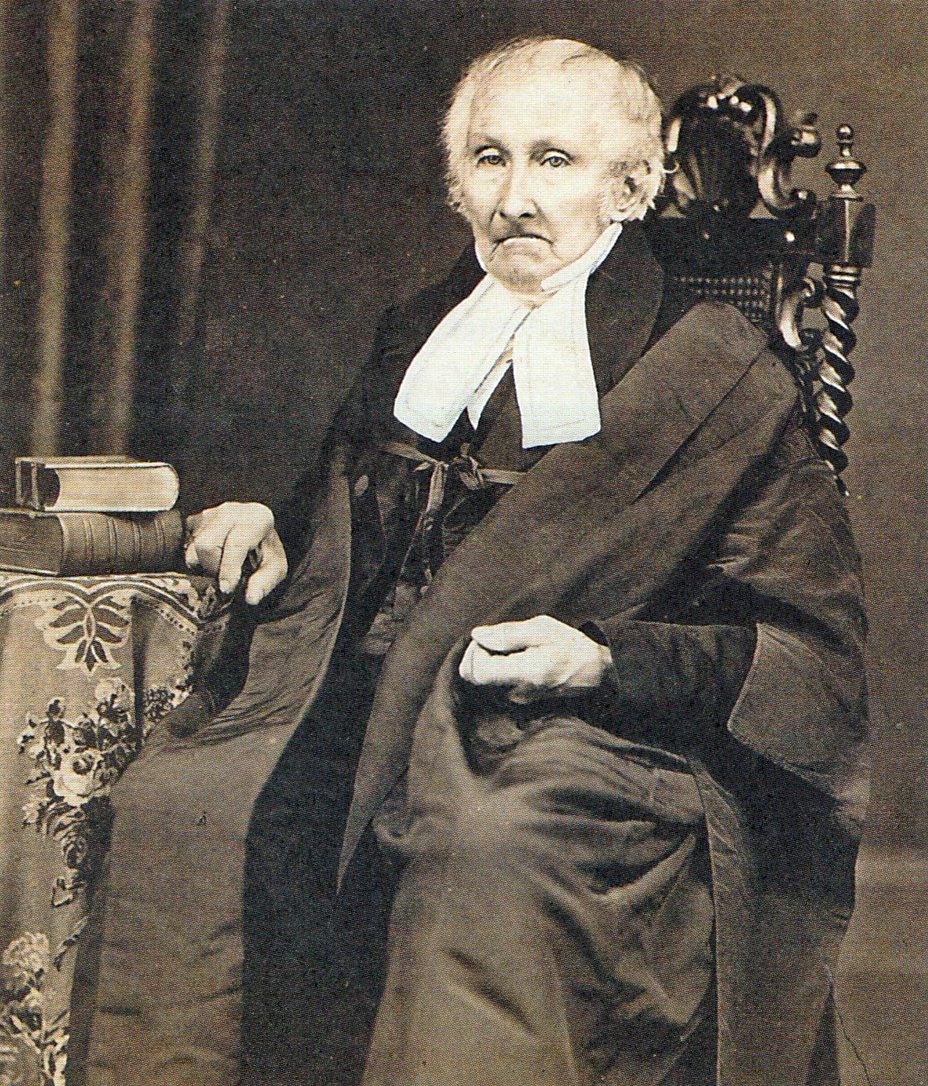
William Macpherson (bureaucrat) in 1860

William Macpherson of Blairgowrie (26 August 1784 - 13 March 1866), a Deputy Lieutenant of Perthshire, Scotland, Clerk of the New South Wales Legislative Council, was born in Barrackpore, India. He was the eldest son of Colonel Allan Macpherson, who was at that time on duty in the Bengal establishment of the East India Company's services, and Eliza Dell, née Fraser.

Macpherson, together with his wife and son, Allan, went to Sydney, Australia in 1829 where he took up the position of Collector of Internal Revenue in New South Wales.

He held several other senior positions in the New South Wales public service and retired in 1859 as Clerk of the New South Wales Legislative Council.

His son, Allan Macpherson, was a member of the New South Wales Legislative Assembly and represented the Electoral district of Central Cumberland from 1863 to 1868.

William Macpherson died in Sydney on 13 March 1866.

== See also ==
- Clan Macpherson
