= Ralph Mansfield =

Ralph Mansfield (12 March 1799 – 1 September 1880) was a Methodist missionary and newspaper editor in colonial Australia.

Born in Liverpool, Merseyside, England, son of Ralph Mansfield, an earthenware manufacturer, and his wife Ann, née Worthington. Mansfield junior was ordained a minister of the Wesleyan Church in 1820.

Mansfield arrived in Sydney, New South Wales, in September 1820. He was stationed in Sydney for two years and in Parramatta and Windsor during 1823, when he was sent to Van Diemen's Land (later renamed Tasmania), where he remained at Hobart Town till 1825, when he returned to Sydney and discharged ministerial functions till 1828.

His first foray into publishing in Australia was as editor of The Australian Magazine from 1821 to 1822, the first literary journal in the colonies. Mansfield was editor of The Sydney Gazette, the first newspaper published in New South Wales, from 1829 to 1832, and was leader-writer for another Sydney newspaper, The Colonist, for several years. From 1841 he contributed to the Sydney Morning Herald. In 1836 he presided at a public meeting held in Sydney to promote the lighting of the city with gas. A gas-light company was formed, of which Mansfield was secretary from 29 June 1836, till his death in Parramatta, New South Wales, on 1 September 1880.

Civic offices
New title	Chairman of the Balmain Municipal Council; 1860 – 1861	Succeeded by George Elliott
Preceded by Owen Evans	Chairman of the Balmain Municipal Council; 1865 – 1866	Succeeded by Walter Church
