= Municipality of Balmain =

Former local government area in New South Wales, Australia

- Local government area
- Country: Australia
- State: New South Wales
- Region: Inner West
- Established: 21 February 1860
- Abolished: 31 December 1948
- Council seat: Balmain Town Hall

Area
  - Total: 3.8 km^{2} (1.5 sq mi)

Population
  - Total: 28,398 (1947 census)
  - Density: 7,470/km^{2} (19,360/sq mi)
LGAs around Municipality of Balmain
| | Sydney Harbour |
| Parramatta River | Municipality of Balmain | Johnstone's Bay |
| Leichhardt | Annandale | Rozelle Bay |

The Municipality of Balmain was a local government area of Sydney, New South Wales, Australia. The municipality was proclaimed in February 1860 and, with an area of 3.8 square kilometres, covered the entire peninsula of Balmain north of Callan Park and Foucart Street, including the present suburbs of Balmain, Balmain East, Birchgrove and Rozelle. The council was amalgamated with the municipalities of Leichhardt and Annandale to the south with the passing of the Local Government (Areas) Act 1948.

== Council history and location ==
The Municipality of Balmain was proclaimed on 21 February and Gazetted on 27 February, with the first elections held on 27 March 1860. The election of the first nine councillors was declared on 5 April 1860, with the first meeting occurring on the first day and the election of the first chairman, Rev. Ralph Mansfield. Following the passing of the Municipalities Act, 1867, chairman was retitled "Mayor" and Councillors became Aldermen. With this Act, the council also became known as the Borough of Balmain (From 28 December 1906, with the passing of the Local Government Act, 1906, the council was again renamed as the "Municipality of Balmain"). On 3 September 1913, the six acres of land adjoining Callan Park Asylum grounds, known as Callan Park were transferred from Leichhardt Council to Balmain, bringing the boundaries further south.

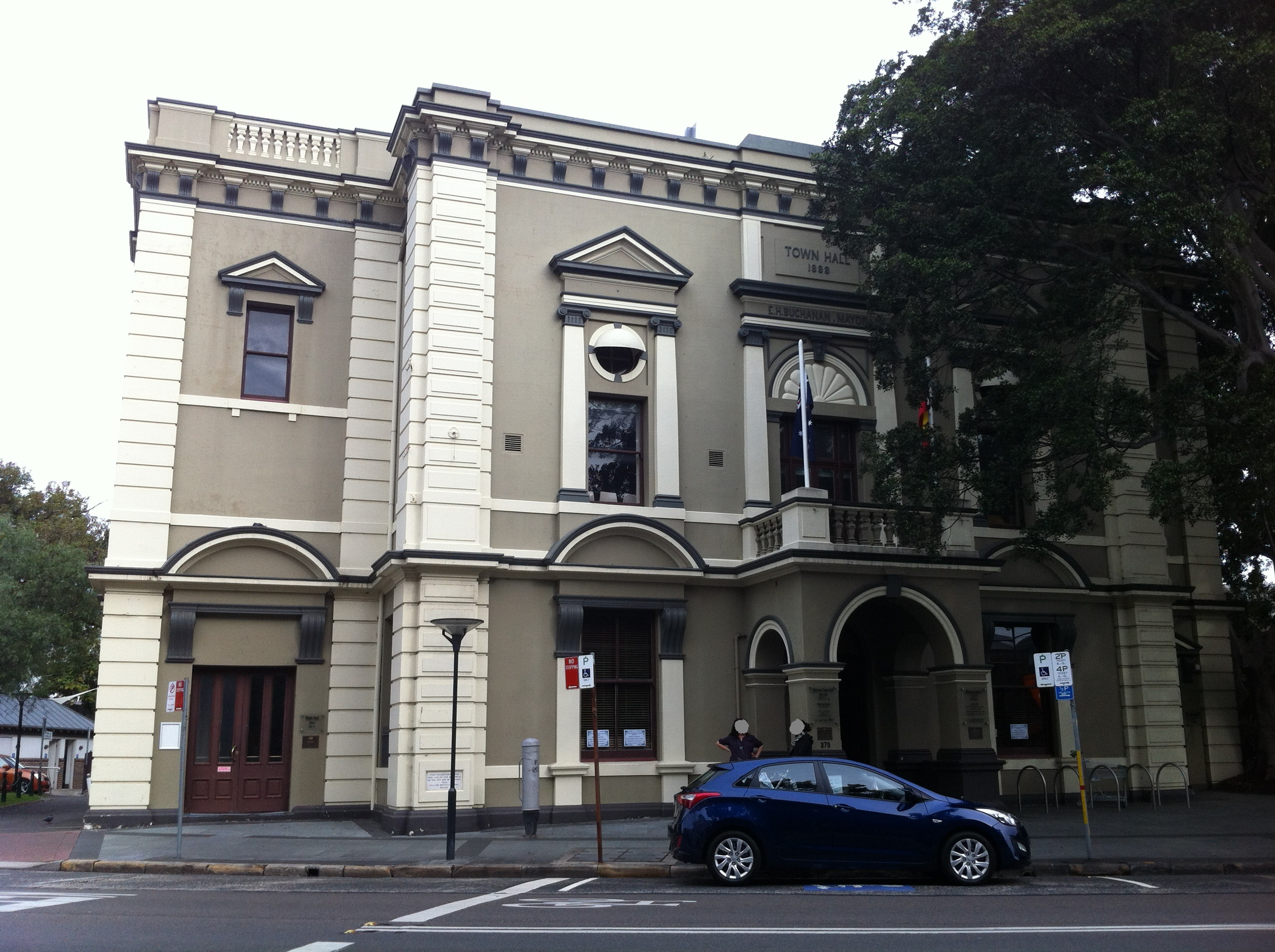
Balmain Town Hall, designed by mayors James McDonald (1881) and Edward Harman Buchanan (1888), was the seat of the council from 1881 to 1948.

The council first met on 5 April 1860 in the loft of a warehouse owned by Councillor Thomas Rowntree on Mort Bay (now the site of Gilchrist Place), then to rooms rented on the western side of Adolphus Street and thereafter in St Mary's schoolroom at 7 Adolphus Street. From 1862 to 1876, the council met in the Balmain School of Arts on 142 Darling Street. The current site of the Balmain Town Hall on Darling Street was purchased in 1876 and the existing stone cottage on the site became the council chambers. The council approved the building of new Council meeting chambers, located as a rear extension to the existing cottage, on 16 March 1880, designed by former Balmain mayor James McDonald, which were completed and opened in June 1881. However the need for large premises and a community hall for public meetings was needed and in 1888 a design by the sitting mayor Edward Harman Buchanan was accepted and demolition of the existing cottage commenced. Buchanan's design in the Victorian Free Classical style town hall included the centenary hall, a library, mayor's room, several rooms for council officers, and a council clerk's residence. The council grew a reputation for its strong Labor councils from the 1920s and in 1942–1944 the council was composed entirely of Labor councillors, which led the council to abolish its committees in favour of a cabinet-style system.

By the end of the Second World War, the NSW Government had come to the conclusion, following the recommendation of the 1945–46 Clancy Royal Commission on Local Government Boundaries, that its ideas of infrastructure expansion could not be realised by the present system of the mostly-poor inner-city municipal councils and the Minister for Local Government, Joseph Cahill, pushed through a bill in 1948 that abolished a significant number of those councils. Balmain was abolished and amalgamated with Annandale into the Municipality of Leichhardt following the enactment of the Local Government (Areas) Act 1948, which came into effect from 1 January 1949.

== Mayors ==
Rev. Ralph Mansfield (1799–1880), first Chairman of the Balmain Municipality.

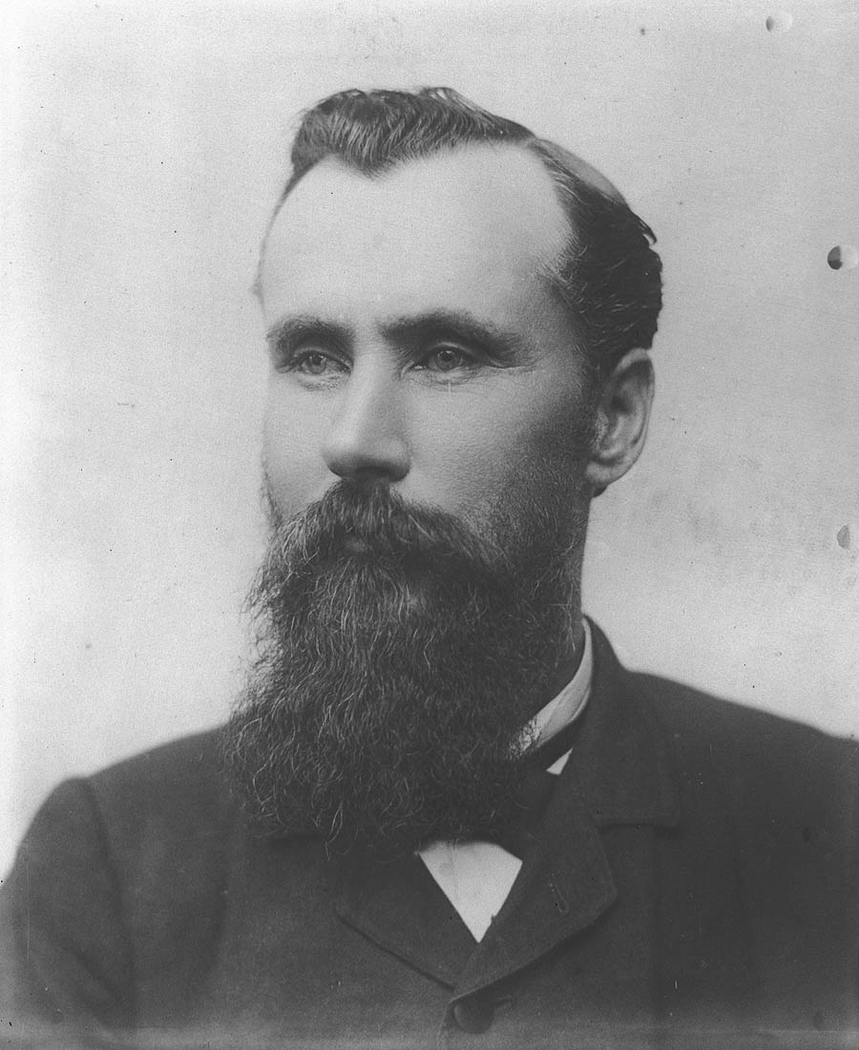
Hon. Jacob Garrard (1846–1931), Mayor 1885–1886, Secretary for Public Works 1885–1886, Minister for Public Instruction 1894–1898.

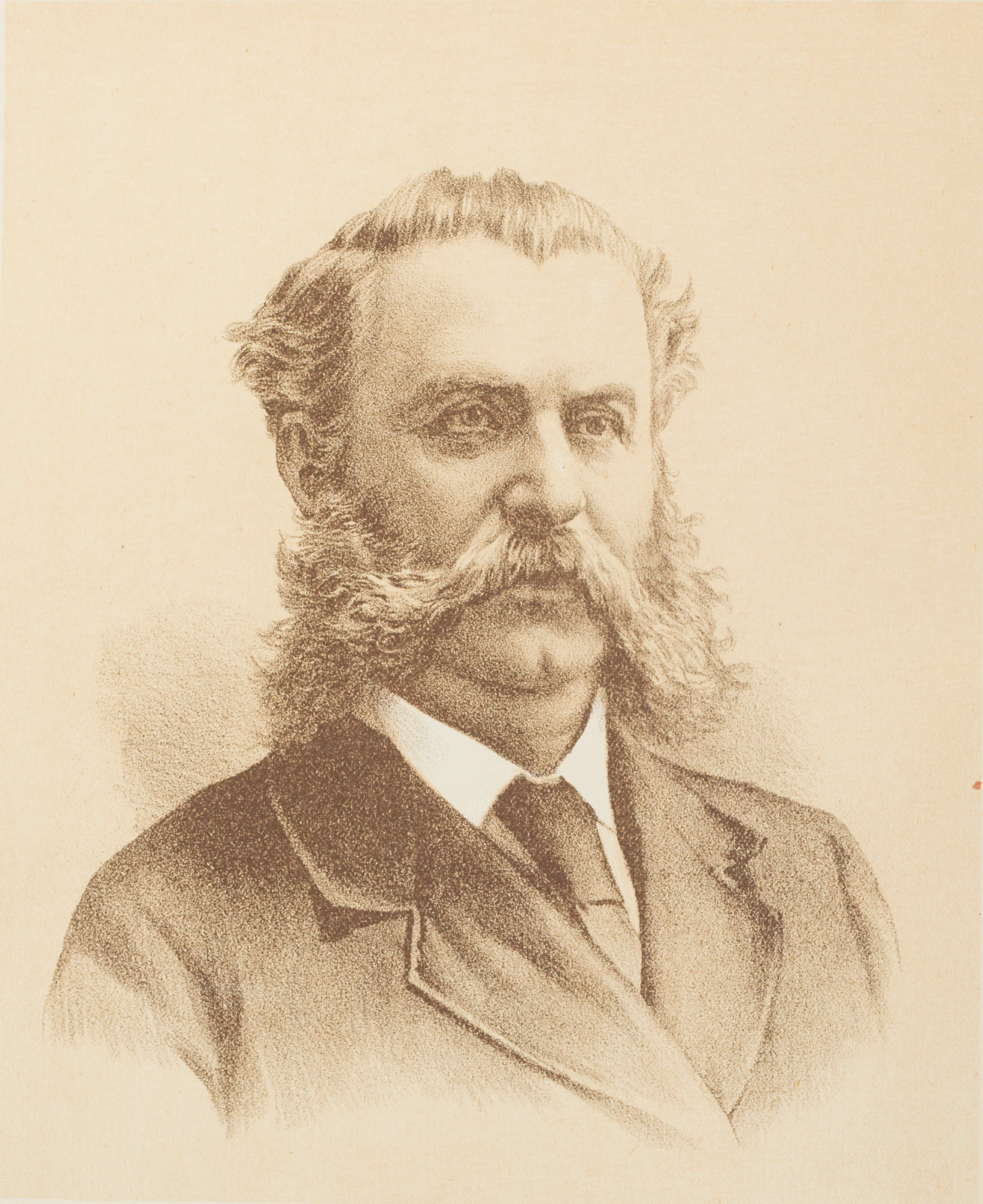
Frederick Trouton (1826–1896), Mayor 1873-1874

| Years | Chairman | Notes |
|---|---|---|
| 5 April 1860 – February 1861 | Ralph Mansfield | |
| February 1861 – February 1862 | George Elliott | |
| February 1862 – February 1863 | Nicol Stenhouse | |
| February 1863 – February 1864 | Walter Church | |
| February 1864 – 1864 | Thomas Rowntree | |
| 1864 – February 1865 | Owen Evans | |
| February 1865 – February 1866 | Ralph Mansfield | |
| February 1866 – 15 February 1867 | Walter Church | |
| 15 February 1867 – 23 December 1867 | John Booth | |
| Years | Mayors | |
| 23 December 1867 – 6 February 1868 | John Booth | |
| 6 February 1868 – February 1869 | Henry Perdriau | |
| February 1869 – February 1870 | Frederick Robinson | |
| February 1870 – 15 February 1871 | Josiah Mullens | |
| 15 February 1871 – 15 February 1872 | Thomas Rowntree | |
| 15 February 1872 – 1872 | George Elliott | |
| 1872 – 12 February 1873 | Henry Perdriau | |
| 12 February 1873 – 21 March 1873 | Charles Mossman | |
| 25 March 1873 – 10 February 1874 | Frederick Trouton | |
| 10 February 1874 – 10 February 1875 | John Taylor | |
| 10 February 1875 – 8 February 1876 | Henry Perdriau | |
| 8 February 1876 – 15 February 1877 | Solomon Hyam | |
| 15 February 1877 – 15 February 1878 | John Taylor | |
| 15 February 1878 – 11 February 1880 | James McDonald | |
| 11 February 1880 – February 1881 | Albert Elkington | |
| February 1881 – 12 February 1883 | William Alston Hutchinson | |
| 12 February 1883 – 11 February 1885 | James Cameron | |
| 11 February 1885 – 8 February 1886 | Jacob Garrard | |
| 8 February 1886 – 16 February 1887 | John Greenway Punch | |
| 16 February 1887 – 28 February 1888 | William Moffit Burns | |
| 28 February 1888 – 7 January 1890 | Edward Harman Buchanan | |
| 7 January 1890 – 20 February 1890 | James McDonald (acting) | |
| 20 February 1890 – 10 March 1891 | George Clubb | |
| 10 March 1891 – 11 February 1892 | James Brodie | |
| 11 February 1892 – 2 November 1893 | James Wheeler | |
| 2 November 1893 – 8 March 1895 | Henry Swan | |
| 8 March 1895 – 16 February 1897 | Alexander Martin Milne | |
| 16 February 1897 – 17 February 1899 | Gilbert Curtis Murdoch | |
| 17 February 1899 – 14 February 1901 | Henry Mills | |
| 14 February 1901 – 14 February 1902 | Alexander Martin Milne | |
| 14 February 1902 – February 1903 | Harry Cox | |
| February 1903 – 18 February 1905 | Alfred Crump | |
| 18 February 1905 – 1 March 1908 | Matthew Henry Cohen | |
| 1 March 1908 – February 1909 | William John Laws | |
| February 1909 – 1 June 1909 | Thomas Minty | |
| June 1909 – February 1911 | Alfred Crump | |
| February 1911 – February 1912 | Matthew Henry Cohen | |
| February 1912 – February 1914 | George Clubb | |
| February 1914 – 3 February 1916 | Henry Swan | |
| 3 February 1916 – February 1918 | Henry Scott | |
| February 1918 – February 1920 | Donald McKenzie | |
| February 1920 – February 1922 | Reginald Thornton | |
| February 1922 – February 1923 | William Wainwright | |
| February 1923 – February 1924 | Bertie Wheeler (ALP) | |
| February 1924 – February 1925 | George Mullins (ALP) | |
| February 1925 – February 1926 | Thomas Harrington (ALP) | |
| February 1926 – February 1929 | Reginald Thornton | |
| February 1929 – January 1932 | Lyle Swan | |
| January 1932 – December 1932 | Reginald Thornton | |
| December 1932 – 1935 | Gilbert Storey (ALP) | |
| 1935 – 1936 | Cecil Stapleton | |
| 1936 – 1936 | John Waite | |
| December 1936 – 1938 | Michael Cashman (ALP) | |
| 1938 – 1939 | Robert Brownlee (Lang Labor) | |
| 1939 – 1940 | Herman Angelini (Lang Labor) | |
| 1940 – 1941 | John Waite | |
| 1941 – January 1942 | Michael Cashman (ALP) | |
| January 1942 – 9 November 1942 | Michael Hubert McMahon (ALP) | |
| November 1942 – December 1943 | Robert Brownlee (ALP) | |
| December 1943 – December 1944 | George Harris | |
| December 1944 – December 1945 | Edward Erwin (ALP) | |
| December 1945 – December 1946 | Gilbert Lockhart | |
| December 1946 – 11 December 1947 | Charles Laggan | |
| 11 December 1947 – 31 December 1948 | Richard O'Connor (ALP) | |

== See also ==
- John McMahon, Balmain Alderman (1942–1944), State MP for Balmain (1950–1968).
- William O'Connor, Balmain Alderman (1944–1948), Member of the House of Representatives (1946–1969).
