= The Australian Magazine (1821) =

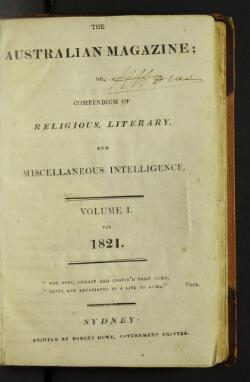
- First page of the first issue
- Editor: Ralph Mansfield
- Frequency: Monthly
- Format: Octavo
- First issue: May 1, 1821; 203 years ago
- Final issue: May 1, 1822
- Country: Australia
- Based in: Sydney
- Language: English

The Australian Magazine, or, Compendium of Religion, Literary, and Miscellaneous Intelligence was the first periodical produced in Australia. It was a short-lived publication. In later years there were a number of other unrelated periodicals that were also called The Australian Magazine.

== History ==
The Australian Magazine appeared monthly in Sydney, New South Wales, between May 1821 and May 1822. It was Octavo in size, contained 32 pages and individual copies sold for two shillings and sixpence per issue. Those who took out an annual subscription paid a reduced amount of one shilling and threepence per issue. Readers from as far away as Hobart subscribed to the publication.

The journal was printed by George Howe, the printer of The Sydney Gazette, Australia's first newspaper, and later, by his son, Robert Howe. Good quality paper and ink was hard to find in the colony and the production standards of the publication was not high.

The magazine was edited by the Rev. Ralph Mansfield, assisted by Rev Benjamin Carvosso and Rev Walter Lowry. It contained articles on theology and general topics, poetry, short stories and items of local news.

The same title was used by other Australian periodicals in the nineteenth century. These began, respectively, in 1835, 1838, 1859 and 1899. More journals used the name in the 20th century.

The full run of the magazine has been made available online by the National Library of Australia.
