= Allan Macpherson =

Australian politician

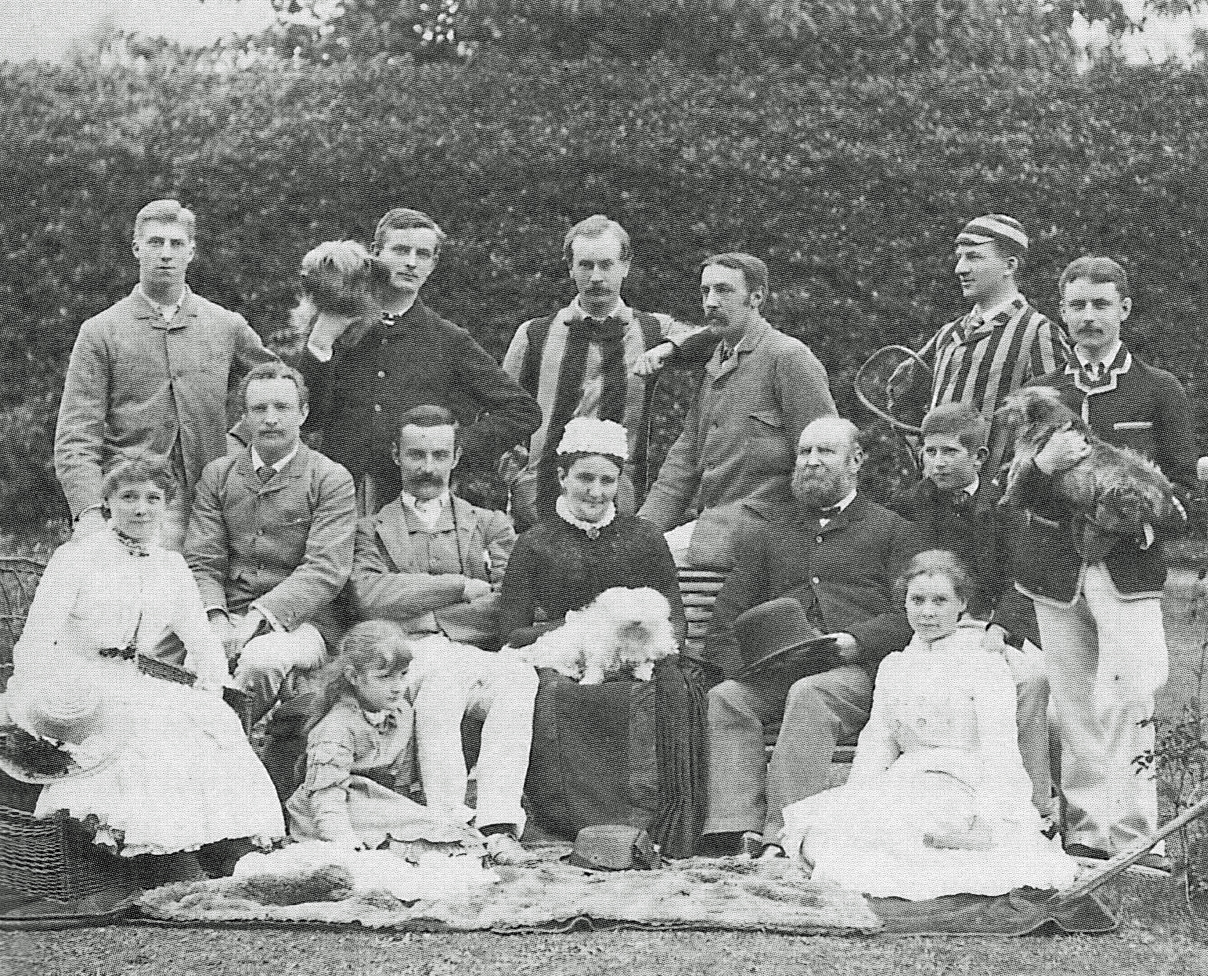
Allan Macpherson (holding hat) and Family in 1884 at Blairgowrie, Scotland

Allan Macpherson (24 October 1818 – 6 November 1891) was a squatter, pastoralist and politician in the colony of New South Wales, a member of the Legislative Assembly.

== Early life ==
Macpherson was born at Blairgowrie, Scotland.

He went to Sydney, Australia with his parents Willam and Jessie Macpherson (née Chalmers) in 1829 where he attended Cape's School and later squatted on the rural properties of Keera near Bingara, New South Wales and Mount Abundance near Roma in Queensland. Macpherson's account of his experiences as a squatter, recounts his constant conflicts with the Aboriginal peoples of the Mandandanji nation. He returned to Scotland in 1850, and in 1853 he married Emma Blake, daughter of Charles Henry Blake and his wife, Frances. He visited Australia in 1856-57 and sold his squatting properties, before his family moved to Sydney in 1862.

== Politics ==
Macpherson was a candidate for the New South Wales Legislative Assembly as the member for Central Cumberland at the 1860 election, but was unsuccessful. He won the seat at the 1863 by-election, and held it at the 1864-5 election. He was involved in the first physical fight in the Legislative Assembly in February 1868, with Macpherson taunting Benjamin Lee, to which Lee responded by punching Macpherson in the face, whilst still in the house and Macpherson horsewhipping Lee after he had been ejected by the serjeant-at-arms. Macpherson did not hold any ministerial office and resigned in December 1868.

== Later life ==
Macpherson and his family once more returned to Blairgowrie in 1868, and he died there on 6 November 1891 (aged 73).

== See also ==
- Clan Macpherson

New South Wales Legislative Assembly
Preceded by James Atkinson	Member for Central Cumberland; 1864 – 1867; Served alongside: Laycock / Hay / Lackey	Succeeded by Samuel Lyons
