= John Hay (New South Wales politician) =

Australian politician

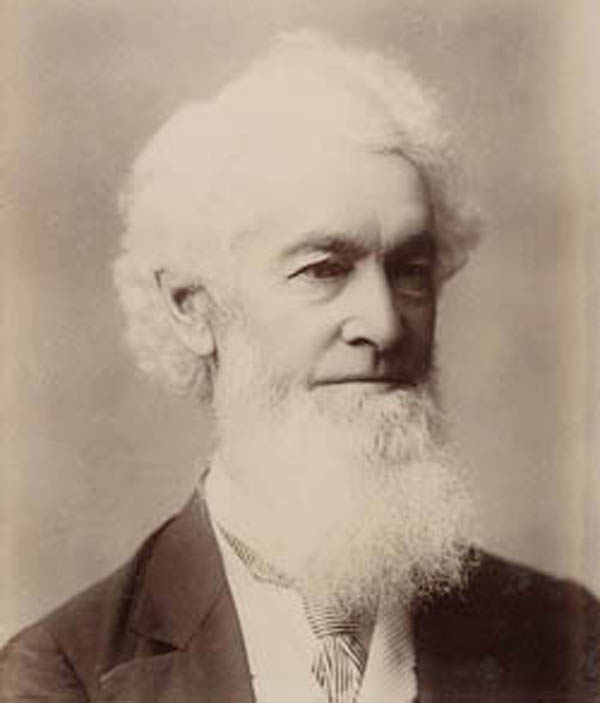
- Born: 23 June 1816; Little Ythsie
- Died: 20 January 1892 (aged 75); Rose Bay
- Occupation: Politician

Sir John Hay KCMG (23 June 1816 – 20 January 1892) was a New South Wales politician.

== Life ==
Hay was born at Little Ythsie, Aberdeenshire, Scotland, the son of John Hay (a farmer) and his wife Jean, née Mair. Hay graduated M.A. at King's College (now part of the University of Aberdeen), in 1834, and then studied law at Edinburgh, but did not finish it. In 1838 Hay married Mary Chalmers and they travelled to Sydney on the Amelia Thompson, arriving on 1 July and settled at 'Welaregang' station on the Upper Murray.

Hay was a strong opponent of tariffs on trade between New South Wales and Victoria and was elected in April 1856 as the member for Murrumbidgee in the first Legislative Assembly. He took up residence in Sydney but continued to maintain his Murrumbidgee runs. In September, he moved a vote of no-confidence in the Cowper ministry, which brought the government down.

He was elected as the member for the new seat of Murray at the 1859 election, and strongly opposed John Robertson's land bills and sought to protect the interests of squatters. In the December 1860 elections, fought on the issue, he was one a few opponents of Robertson elected.

Hay successfully contested the seat Central Cumberland at the 1864 election, near Sydney to make clear his opposition to the making of the Riverina into a separate colony.

In June 1867 he resigned from the Legislative Assembly and was appointed to the Legislative Council. In July 1873 was appointed its President on the recommendation of Sir Henry Parkes, and held this position until his death. Hay was created a K.C.M.G. in 1878.

John Hay died on 20 January 1892 (aged 75) in the Sydney suburb of Rose Bay, survived by his wife for ten days. They had no children.

== Legacy ==
The township of Hay on the lower Murrumbidgee River was named after John Hay.

New South Wales Legislative Assembly
New assembly	Member for Murrumbidgee; 1856 – 1859; Served alongside: George Macleay	Succeeded by William Macleay
New district	Member for Murray; 1859 – 1864	Succeeded by Robert Landale
Preceded by John Laycock	Member for Central Cumberland; 1864 – 1867; Served alongside: Allan Macpherson	Succeeded by John Lackey
Preceded by Terence Murray	Speaker of the Legislative Assembly; 1862 – 1865	Succeeded by William Arnold
New South Wales Legislative Council
Preceded by Sir Terence Murray	President of the Legislative Council; 1873 – 1892	Succeeded by Sir John Lackey
Political offices
Preceded by Terence Murray	Secretary for Lands and Works; 1856 – 1857	Succeeded by Terence Murray
