= John Laycock (Australian politician) =

Australian politician

John Connell Laycock (2 December 1818 – 30 November 1897) was an Australian politician.

He was born in Sydney to storekeeper and pastoralist Thomas Laycock and Margaret Connell. He owned land at Yamba. On 1 February 1843 he married Mary Jane Simpson, with whom he had four children. In 1859 he was elected to the New South Wales Legislative Assembly for Central Cumberland. He transferred to Clarence in 1864, but resigned in 1866. Laycock died at Parramatta in 1897.

New South Wales Legislative Assembly
| New seat | Member for Central Cumberland; 1859–1864; Served alongside: Atkinson/Macpherson | Succeeded by John Hay |
| Preceded by Clark Irving | Member for Clarence; 1864–1866 | Succeeded by John Robertson |
