= Richard Sadleir =

Irish-born Australian politician

- Born: 6 May 1794; Cork
- Died: 6 March 1889 (aged 94); Liverpool
- Occupation: Politician

Richard Sadleir (6 May 1794 – 6 March 1889) was an Irish-born Australian politician.

He was born at Cork to landowner James Sadleir. Despite an intention to enter the church, he went to sea with the Royal Navy in 1808, travelling widely before returning to Ireland a lieutenant in 1821. In 1825 he migrated to New South Wales, and in 1829 he married Ann Cartwright. From 1826 he was a settler in the Hunter River, and from 1829 he was a schoolmaster at the Male Orphan School in Liverpool. In 1861 he was elected to the New South Wales Legislative Assembly for Lower Hunter, but he did not re-contest in 1864. He was an alderman and the first mayor of Liverpool from 1872. Sadleir died at Liverpool in 1889. The Sydney suburb of Sadleir was named after him.

== See also ==
- O'Byrne, William Richard (1849). "Sadleir, Richard" . A Naval Biographical Dictionary . John Murray – via Wikisource.

New South Wales Legislative Assembly
Preceded by Alexander Scott	Member for Lower Hunter; 1861–1864	Succeeded by Robert Wisdom
