= Robert Landale =

Australian politician (1832–1903)

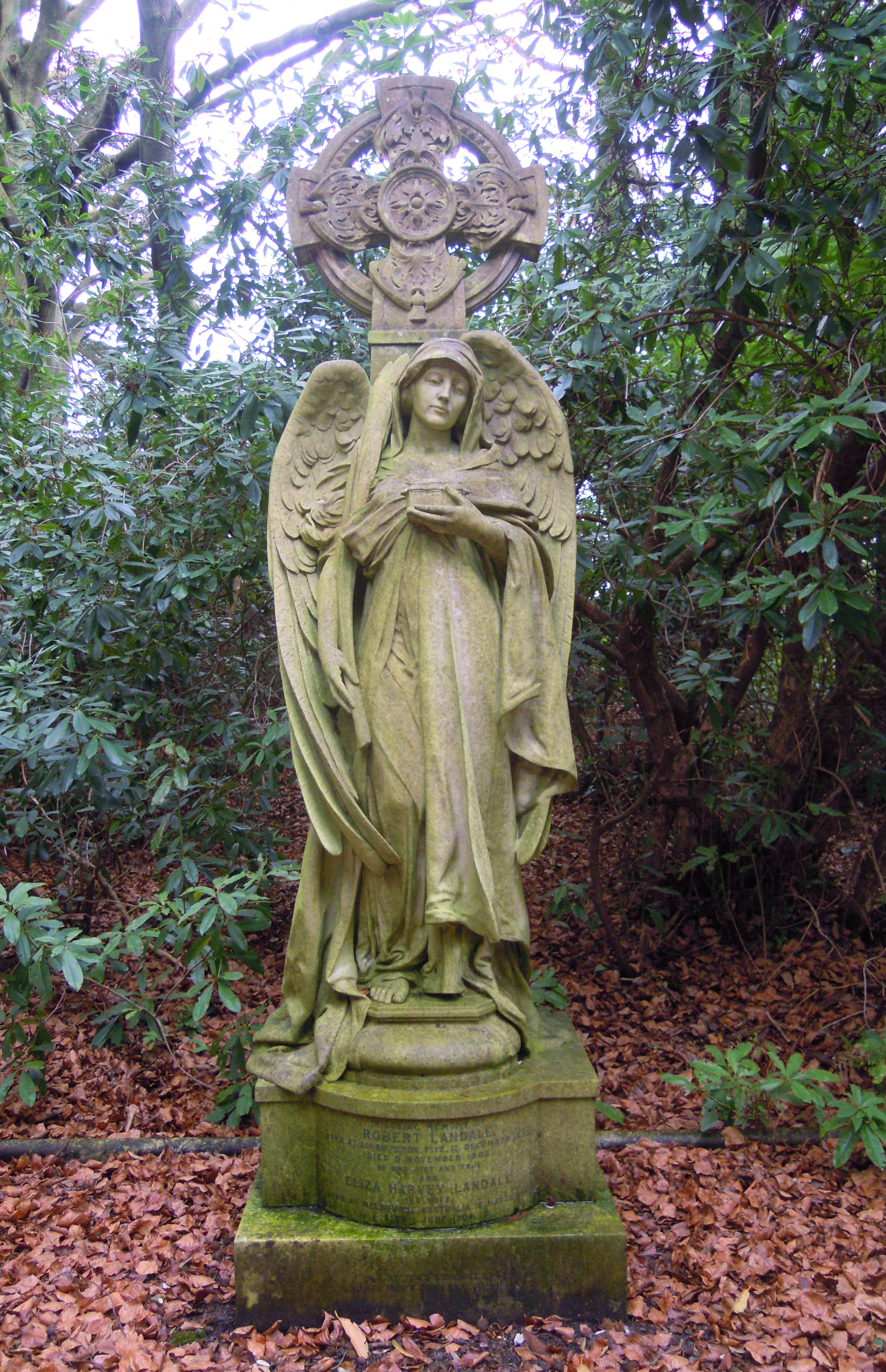
Grave of Robert Landale in Brookwood Cemetery

Robert Landale (17 December 1832 – 5 November 1903) was an Australian politician, elected as a member of the New South Wales Legislative Assembly.

Born at Lindifferon in Fife, Landale was a pastoralist who settled in the Moulamein area in 1860s with his brother Alexander. He was elected as the member for Murray in December 1864 and represented it for the rest of the parliamentary term, finishing in November 1869. He died on 5 November 1903 (aged 70) in England, and is buried in Brookwood Cemetery in a substantial family plot in Plot 103.

He had a wife Eliza Harvey, with whom he had daughter and four sons, Robert Hunter, Cyril, Percy and Walter.

New South Wales Legislative Assembly
| Preceded by John Hay | Member for Murray; 1864 – 1869 | Succeeded by Patrick Jennings |
