= 1864–65 New South Wales colonial election =

Colonial election for New South Wales, Australia in 1864–65

New South Wales colonial election, 1864–65
- 22 November 1864 – 10 January 1865

All 72 seats in the New South Wales Legislative Assembly 37 Assembly seats were needed for a majority
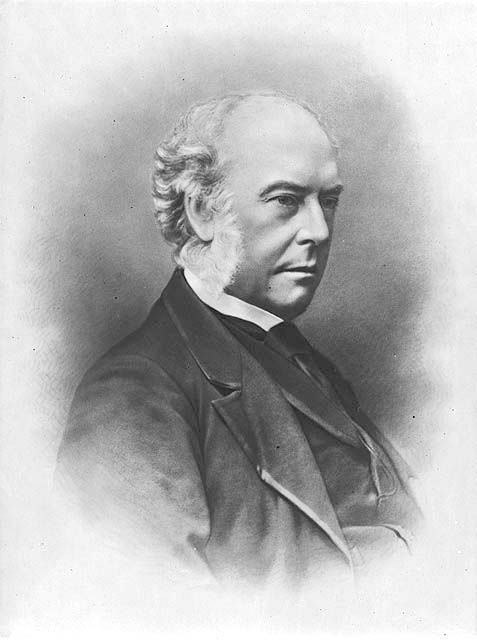

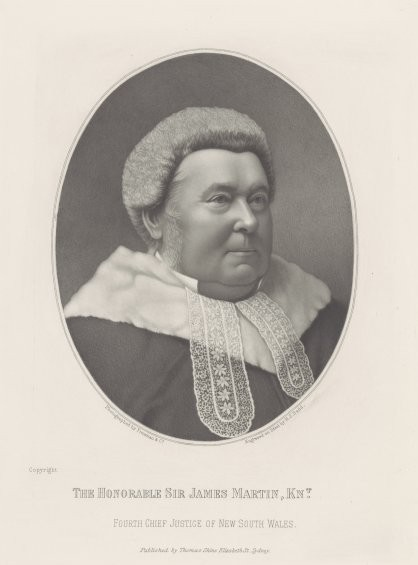
| | First party | Second party |
|---|---|---|
| Leader | Charles Cowper | James Martin |
| Party | Opposition | Government |
| Leader's seat | East Sydney | Tumut (elected to Lachlan and Monaro) |
| Seats before | 36 | 29 |
| Seats won | 48 | 19 |
| Seat change | ▲12 | ▼10 |
- Results of the election, showing winners in each seat. Seats without member charts indicate the electorate returned one member.
Premier before election
James Martin
Elected Premier
Charles Cowper

The 1864–65 New South Wales colonial election was held between 22 November 1864 and 10 January 1865. This election was for all of the 72 seats in the New South Wales Legislative Assembly and it was conducted in 52 single-member constituencies, six 2-member constituencies and two 4-member constituencies, all with a first past the post system. The previous parliament of New South Wales was dissolved on 10 November 1864 by the Governor, Sir John Young, on the advice of the Premier, James Martin. Suffrage was limited to adult white males.

There was no recognisable party structure at this election; instead the government was determined by a loose, shifting factional system.

== Key dates ==
| Date | Event |
|---|---|
| 10 November 1864 | The Legislative Assembly was dissolved, and writs were issued by the Governor to proceed with an election. |
| 21 November to 23 December 1864 | Nominations for candidates for the election closed. |
| 22 November 1864 to 10 January 1865 | Polling days. |
| 24 January 1865 | Opening of new Parliament. |

== Results ==
New South Wales colonial election, 22 November 1864 – 10 January 1865 Legislative Assembly << 1860–1869–70 >>
| Enrolled voters | 111,302 | | | | |
| Votes cast | 66,775 | | Turnout | 51.40 (Note: There were 15 uncontested districts and turnout is based on the roll of 84,683 for the contested districts.) | +8.49 |
| Informal votes | 156 | | Informal | 0.36 | +0.19 |
Summary of votes by party
| Party | Primary votes | % | Swing | Seats | Change |
| Total | 66,775 | | | 72 | |

== See also ==
- Members of the New South Wales Legislative Assembly, 1864–1869
- Candidates of the 1864–65 New South Wales colonial election
