= Walter Church (Australian politician) =

Australian politician

Walter Church (1829 – 28 February 1901) was an English-born Australian politician.

He was born in London to mariner John Foster Church and Barbara Ann George. He migrated to New South Wales around 1839 and became a custom house agent. On 1 September 1849 he married Annie Esther Stubbs, with whom he had eleven children. A second marriage on 22 April 1899 to Miriam Kate Cohen produced no children. From 1868 he worked as a grocer. In 1869 he was elected to the New South Wales Legislative Assembly for Goldfields West, serving until his defeat in 1872. Church died in Sydney in 1901.

Civic offices
Preceded by Nicol Stenhouse	Chairman of the Balmain Municipal Council; 1863–1864	Succeeded by Thomas Rowntree
Preceded by Ralph Mansfield	Chairman of the Balmain Municipal Council; 1866–1867	Succeeded by John Booth
New South Wales Legislative Assembly
Preceded by George Thornton	Member for Goldfields West; 1869–1872	Succeeded by David Buchanan
