= George Thornton (politician) =

Australian politician (1819–1901)

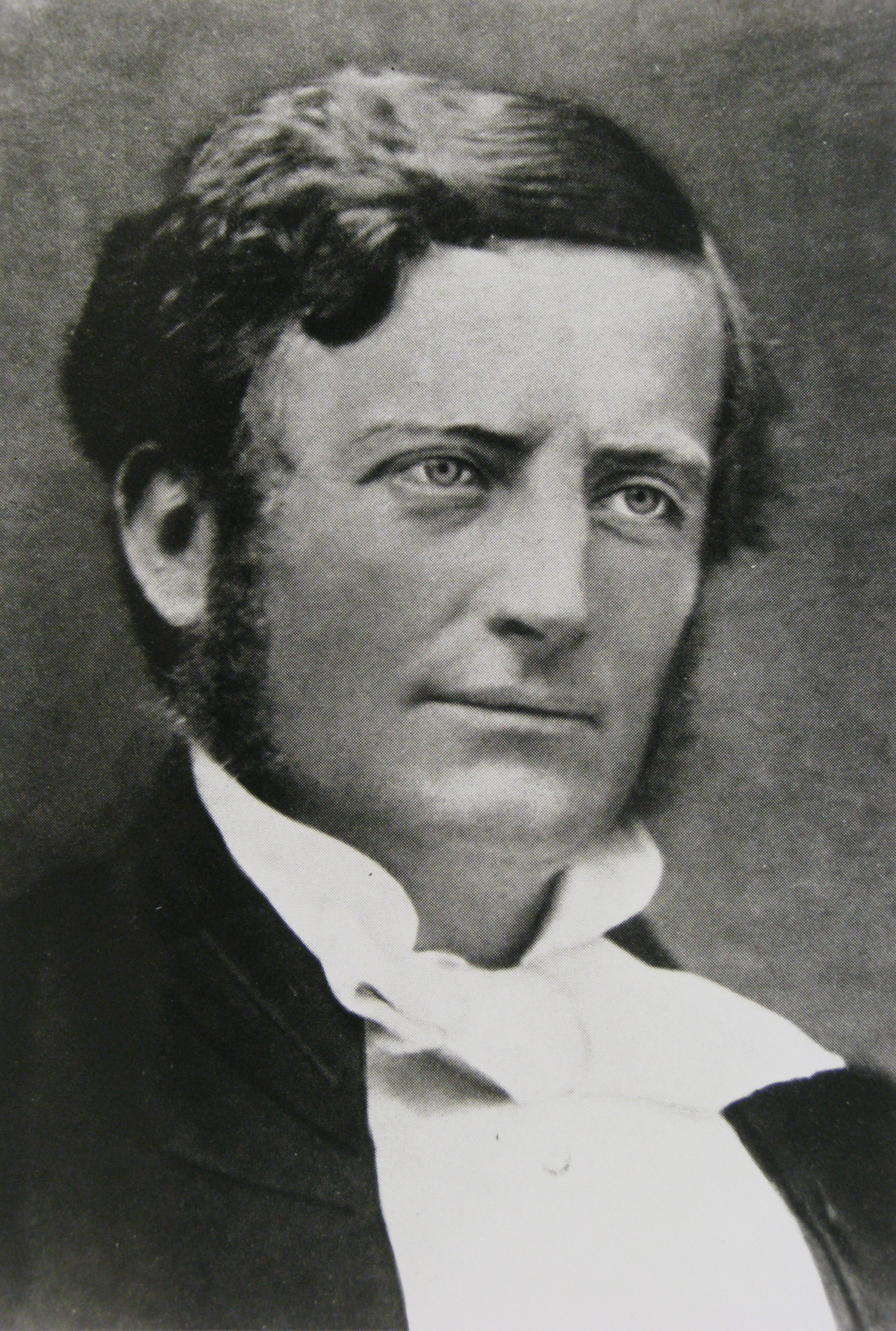
- Thornton in 1860

10th Mayor of Sydney
- In office 1857–1857
- Preceded by: Daniel Egan
- Succeeded by: John Williams

Personal details
- Born: 23 December 1819 Sydney, Australia
- Died: 23 November 1901 (aged 81) Parramatta, Australia

George Thornton (23 December 1819 – 23 November 1901) was an Australian merchant and politician, serving as a Sydney Municipal Council Alderman, Mayor of Sydney and member of the New South Wales Legislative Assembly and Legislative Council.

== Life ==
Thornton was born in Sydney, the son of Samuel Thornton (son of another Samuel, a woollen manufacturer of Barnsley, Yorkshire) and Sarah (née Madden). Sarah was transported to Australia as a punishment for larceny; Samuel followed, arriving in Sydney in 1814 as a free settler, and was granted land by the colonial government. As a young man he had considerable contact with Aboriginal people, and late in life recorded the pronunciation and meaning of many Aboriginal placenames.

Thornton was educated at the Australian College on Jamieson Street, Sydney; he went into work as a custom-house and ship agent, later becoming an import merchant. Having been a magistrate in Sydney for many years, Thornton served also as a director of various financial institutions such as the City Bank of Sydney. He was elected to the Sydney Municipal Council in November 1847, and served as mayor in 1853 and 1857. Thornton was elected as a member for Sydney City from 1858 to 1859. In May 1861 he was appointed to the Legislative Council when Governor Young agreed to flood the council in support of John Robertson's land bills, but this was frustrated when the president of the council, Sir William Burton refused to swear in the new members and resigned with others forcing the proroguing of the council. He represented Goldfields West in 1867 and 1868. In 1877 he was appointed for life to the council and was served as the Secretary for Mines and the Representative of Government for a month in 1885.

Thornton was the foundation President of the Sydney Rowing Club and was instrumental in the club's formation and growth from 1870 until his death. He served as President of the New South Wales Rowing Association from 1879 till his death.

Thornton died of dysentery in 1901 at Parramatta, survived by his wife, Mary Ann (daughter of John Solomon, of Sydney) and daughter Frances; he was predeceased by a son and a daughter.

== Legacy ==
The Hyde Park Obelisk, erected during Thornton's mayorship, is jokingly referred to as Thornton's Scent Bottle.

Parliament of New South Wales
Political offices
Preceded by Francis Wright	Secretary for Mines; November – December 1885	Succeeded by Robert Vaughn
Preceded by James Farnell	Representative of the Government in the Legislative Council; November – December 1885	Succeeded by George Simpson
New South Wales Legislative Assembly
Preceded by Robert Campbell; Charles Cowper; James Wilshire; William Dalley	Member for Sydney City; 1858–1859; With: Robert Campbell; Charles Cowper; Robert Tooth	District abolished
Preceded by Stephen Donnelly	Member for Goldfields West; 1867–1868	Succeeded by Walter Church
Civic offices
Dormant Title last held by Daniel Egan	Mayor of Sydney; 1857	Succeeded by John Williams
