= Archibald Jacob =

Australian politician

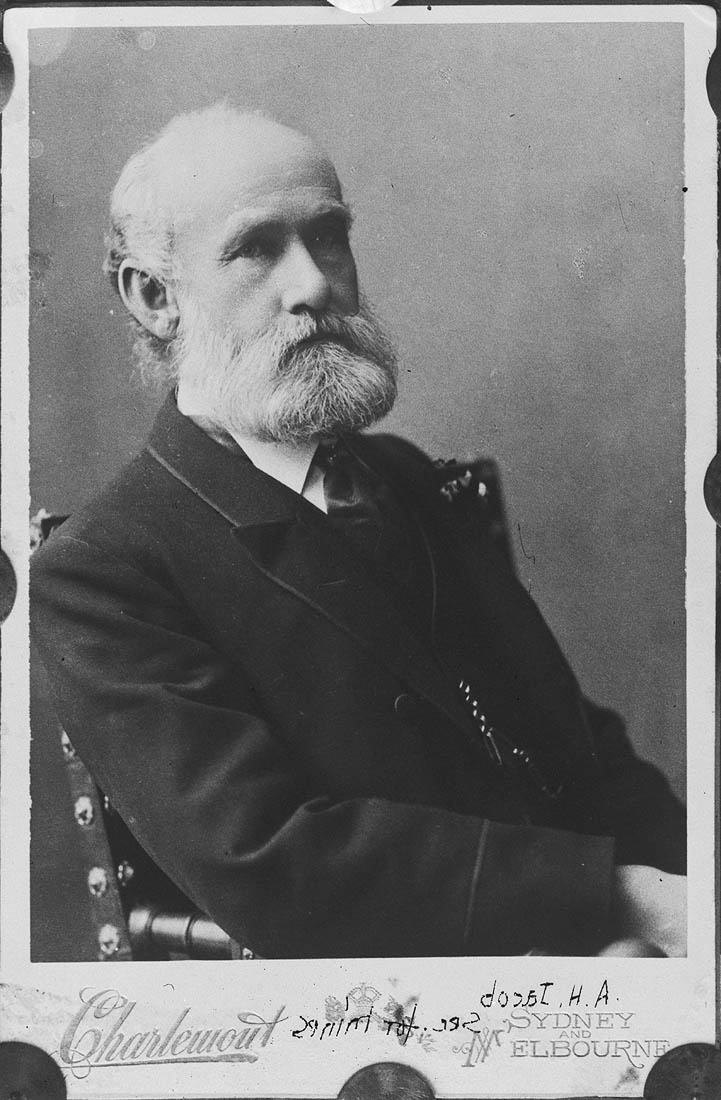

Archibald Hamilton Jacob (31 July 1829 – 28 May 1900) was a politician in the colony of New South Wales. He served nearly thirty years in the lower and upper houses of the colonial government, as both elected and appointed representative, government minister and Chairman of Committees of the New South Wales Legislative Council.

Jacob was born in Jessore, in the Bengal Presidency of British India (now in Bangladesh). He was the second surviving son of Captain Vickers Jacob (1789–1836), who was the oldest son of twelve children of Dr John Jacob of Ballinakill and Dublin, Ireland. Jacob's mother was Anne, née Watson (1796–1836) from Nottingham, England, who was a daughter of Major Watson of the East India Company Presidency armies. Major Watson was also a magistrate and deputy lieutenant of Nottinghamshire.

Vickers Jacob and Anne Watson married in 1817 at Barrackpore, Bengal, the cantonment where Vickers was stationed in the Bengal Army of the East India Company. Captain Jacob resigned his commission to settle in New South Wales in 1820, where he became a merchant, importer, coastal trader and landowner, securing land grants during the early settlement of Newcastle, and in the Hunter Valley northwest of Sydney. By the time of Archibald's birth in Bengal in 1829, Captain Jacob had returned to India with his wife and two very young daughters, and had become a jute planter in Jessore and indigo merchant in Calcutta.

Archibald Jacob was suddenly orphaned in India at the age of seven, by the untimely death of both his parents, in different countries in the same year. His father Vickers died of fever in Bengal in June 1836 and was buried in Calcutta. His mother Anne died four months later, in October, in Hobart Town, Van Diemen's Land (now Tasmania), while on her way back to Sydney by ship with her three daughters and two other sons. Archibald and his younger brother Robert had been left behind in Calcutta, where they were boarders for a time at La Martiniere, a newly established Protestant private school for children of European expatriates, before sailing to England to be brought up and educated by his mother's relatives in Nottinghamshire and Cheshire.

In 1851 Archibald and Robert made their way back to New South Wales to take up the family land holdings established in the Hunter Valley by their father in the 1820s. In 1853, at Raymond Terrace in that neighborhood, Archibald married Mary Snodgrass (1830–1897), daughter of a prominent local landowner, retired soldier and colonial politician, Colonel Kenneth Snodgrass.

Jacob was elected as the member for Lower Hunter in the New South Wales Legislative Assembly, and represented that district from 7 March 1872 until 9 November 1880. He succeeded Ezekiel Baker as Secretary for Mines in the Robertson Ministry in November 1877, retiring with his colleagues the following month, when Robertson did not achieve a majority at the election that year. He then represented the Electoral district of Gloucester from 27 November 1880 until 23 November 1882. Jacob was appointed to the New South Wales Legislative Council on 9 October 1883, and was Chairman of Committees from December 1887 until his death thirteen years later.

Jacob died in Ashfield, Sydney on 28 May 1900 (aged 70). He was predeceased by his wife Mary (1897) and survived by five sons.

Parliament of New South Wales
Political offices
Preceded by Ezekiel Baker	Secretary for Mines; November – December 1877	Succeeded by William Suttor Jr.
New South Wales Legislative Assembly
Preceded by Robert Wisdom	Member for Lower Hunter; 1872 – 1880	District abolished
New district	Member for Gloucester; 1880 – 1882	Succeeded by Robert White
New South Wales Legislative Council
Preceded by William Piddington	Chairman of Committees; 1887–1900	Succeeded by William Trickett
