= Stephen Donnelly (Australian politician) =

Australian politician

Stephen Augustine Donnelly (1835 – 26 November 1910) was an Irish-born Australian politician.

He was born at Cork to Cornelius Donnelly and Mary O'Leary, and grew up in Oxford in England. In 1850 he and his family migrated to Western Australia, following the gold rush to Victoria in 1852. He later mined at Lucknow in New South Wales. In 1864 he was elected to the New South Wales Legislative Assembly for Goldfields West, but he resigned in 1866. On 2 May 1868 he married Catherine Agnes Cummings, with whom he had seven children. He worked for the Public Works Department, eventually becoming roads superintendent at Armidale. He retired in 1896 and around 1898 moved to Waratah, where he died in 1910.

New South Wales Legislative Assembly
Preceded by Robert Wisdom	Member for Goldfields West; 1864–1866	Succeeded by George Thornton
