= Robert Wisdom (politician) =

Politician and barrister in New South Wales, Australia

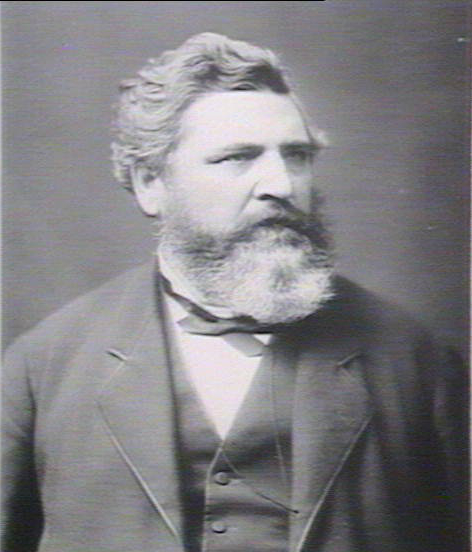

Sir Robert Wisdom, KCMG, QC (31 January 1830 – 16 March 1888) was a politician in colonial New South Wales and Attorney General of New South Wales.

== Early life and education ==
Wisdom was born in Blackburn, Lancashire, England, and arrived in Australia in 1834 with his parents, moving to Morpeth in the Hunter Valley. He was educated at Maitland and at the Sydney College. In November 1858 he was appointed a clerk of petty sessions at Stoney Creek, (Note: It is unclear which Stoney Creek was referred to, it may have been the police district near Molong or the gold field near Burrendong) before being appointed a sub-commissioner of gold fields, and a magistrate.

== Political career ==
In 1859 he resigned his office as gold commissioner in order to stand as a candidate for the new district of Goldfields West, where he was elected at Sofala on a show of hands, and was easily re-elected at the 1860 election. On 26 October 1861 he was admitted to the Colonial Bar. He was chairman of committees from 1861 until 1864, a position that carried a salary of £500, but declined ministerial appointments in the third ministry of Charles Cowper and a proposed ministry of William Forster. He switched to the district of The Lower Hunter, winning the seat at the 1864 election and holding it at the 1869 election. He was also elected to Goldfields North, but resigned to represent The Lower Hunter. He was defeated in 1872, becoming a Crown Prosecutor in 1873.

Parliament was dissolved in November 1874 and Wisdom agreed to be a candidate for the district of Morpeth, winning the seat in 1874. He was appointed a member of the Council of Education 1878. In March 1875 Wisdom was nominated to be the Speaker of the Legislative Assembly but was defeated by a single vote. After declining numerous offers of ministerial positions, he agreed to be Attorney General in the Third ministry of Sir Henry Parkes from August 1879 to January 1883. He personally prosecuted the Watabadgery bushrangers, Captain Moonlite and Thomas Rogan, which drew praise from the Bulletin for his forensic skills. In 1885 he was involved in an altercation with David Buchanan, initially exchanging insults before Wisdom struck Buchanan in the face. He was made a Queen's Counsel in 1886, and decided not to contest the 1887 election.

He was appointed to the Legislative Council in February 1887, shortly before leaving for England with Sir Patrick Jennings as one of the delegates of New South Wales, to the first Colonial Conference. Returning to New South Wales as Sir Robert, he did not take his seat in the Legislative Council before he died on 16 March 1888 (aged 58).

== Honours ==
Wisdom was created a Knight Commander of the Order of St Michael and St George (KCMG) in April 1887.

== Notes ==
Parliament of New South Wales
Political offices
Preceded by William Windeyer	Attorney General; 1879 – 1883	Succeeded by William Dalley QC
New South Wales Legislative Assembly
New seat	Member for Goldfields West; 1859–1864	Succeeded by Stephen Donnelly
Preceded by Richard Sadleir	Member for Lower Hunter; 1869–1872	Succeeded by Archibald Jacob
Preceded by James Hoskins	Member for Goldfields North; 1870–1870	Succeeded by Robert Forster
Preceded by James Campbell	Member for Morpeth; 1874–1887	Succeeded by John Bowes
