= Electoral district of Goldfields West =

Former state electoral district of New South Wales, Australia

Goldfields West was an electoral district of the Legislative Assembly in the Australian state of New South Wales from 1859 to 1880, including the goldfields within a number of western electorates. Rolls were not kept for Gold Fields seats, voters being able to establish their right to vote by presenting either a mining licence or business licence in a proclaimed gold field that had been held for at least six months. Voters could also appear on the roll for general districts, but were prevented from voting in both their resident general district and the overlaying Gold Fields district.

== Members for Goldfields West ==
Member	Party	Period
Robert Wisdom	None	1859–1864
Stephen Donnelly	None	1864–1866
George Thornton	None	1867–1868
Walter Church	None	1869–1872
David Buchanan	None	1872–1877
Hugo Louis Beyers	None	1877–1880

== Election results ==
1877 New South Wales colonial election: Goldfields West Monday 12 November
Candidate	Votes	%
Louis Beyers (elected)	476	57.9
David Buchanan (defeated)	346	42.1
Total formal votes	822	97.9
Informal votes	18	2.1
Turnout	840	8.4
