= Electoral district of Lower Hunter =

Former state electoral district of New South Wales, Australia

The Lower Hunter was an electoral district of the Legislative Assembly in the Australian state of New South Wales from 1859 to 1880. It was located in the Hunter valley.

== Members for Lower Hunter ==
Member	Party	Period
William Windeyer	None	1859–1860
Alexander Scott	None	1860–1861
Richard Sadleir	None	1861–1864
Robert Wisdom	None	1864–1872
Archibald Jacob	None	1872–1880

== Election results ==
1877 New South Wales colonial election: The Lower Hunter Tuesday 30 October
Candidate	Votes	%
Archibald Jacob (re-elected)	unopposed	
