= Electoral results for the district of Argyle =

Argyle, an electoral district of the Legislative Assembly in the Australian state of New South Wales, has existed from the establishment of the Legislative Assembly in 1855 until the district's abolition in 1904.

Election	Member	Party		
1856	John Plunkett	None		
1857 by	Daniel Deniehy	None		
1858	Daniel Deniehy	None		
1859	Terence Murray	None		
1860	Terence Murray	None		
1862 by	Samuel Emmanuel	None		
1864	Phillip Dignam	None		
1869	Edward Butler	None		
1872	Edward Butler	None		
1874	Edward Butler	None		
1877	William Davies	None	Member	Party
1880	William Holborow	None	Phillip G. Myers	None
1881 by	William Holborow	None	John Gannon	None
1882	William Holborow	None	John Gannon	None
1885 by	William Holborow	None	Henry Parkes	None
1885	William Holborow	None	Francis Tait	None
1887	William Holborow	Free Trade	Edward Ball	Free Trade
1889	William Holborow	Free Trade	Thomas Rose	Protectionist
1891	William Holborow	Free Trade	Thomas Rose	Protectionist
1894	Thomas Rose	Protectionist		
1895	Thomas Rose	Protectionist		
1898	Thomas Rose	National Federal		
1901	Thomas Rose	Progressive		

== Election results ==
=== 1901 ===
1901 New South Wales state election: Argyle
Party	Candidate	Votes	%	±%
Progressive	Thomas Rose	1,059	67.3	+12.2
Liberal Reform	Francis Isaac	514	32.7	−12.2
Total formal votes		1,573	99.4	−0.1
Informal votes		9	0.6	+0.1
Turnout		1,582	59.7	−4.6
Progressive hold				

=== 1898 ===
1898 New South Wales colonial election: Argyle
Party	Candidate	Votes	%	±%
National Federal	Thomas Rose	768	55.2	
Free Trade	Francis Isaac	624	44.8	
Total formal votes		0	100.0	
Informal votes		0	0.0	
Turnout		0	0.0	
National Federal hold				

=== 1895 ===
1895 New South Wales colonial election: Argyle
Party	Candidate	Votes	%	±%
Protectionist	Thomas Rose	751	58.6	
Free Trade	Benjamin Short	531	41.4	
Total formal votes		1,282	98.8	
Informal votes		16	1.2	
Turnout		1,298	66.8	
Protectionist hold				

=== 1894 ===
1894 New South Wales colonial election: Argyle
Party	Candidate	Votes	%	±%
Protectionist	Thomas Rose	859	56.4	
Free Trade	Henry Gannon	665	43.6	
Total formal votes		1,524	98.3	
Informal votes		26	1.7	
Turnout		1,550	78.6	
Protectionist win		(previously 2 members)		

Thomas Rose (Protectionist) was one of two sitting members for Argyle. The second member, William Holborow (Free Trade), did not contest the election.

=== 1891 ===
1891 New South Wales colonial election: Argyle Saturday 20 June
Party	Candidate	Votes	%	±%
Protectionist	Thomas Rose (elected 1)	1,162	26.8	
Free Trade	William Holborow (elected 2)	1,074	24.8	
Protectionist	Edward Graham	1,061	24.5	
Free Trade	Edward Ball	1,042	24.0	
Total formal votes		4,339	99.6	
Informal votes		19	0.4	
Turnout		2,252	73.4	
Free Trade hold 2				

=== 1889 ===
1889 New South Wales colonial election: Argyle Saturday 2 February
Party	Candidate	Votes	%	±%
Free Trade	William Holborow (elected 1)	982	25.9	
Free Trade	Edward Ball (elected 2)	950	25.1	
Protectionist	Thomas Rose	941	24.9	
Protectionist	Solomon Meyer	912	24.1	
Total formal votes		3,785	99.6	
Informal votes		17	0.5	
Turnout		1,910	66.0	
Free Trade hold 2				

=== 1887 ===
1887 New South Wales colonial election: Argyle Friday 11 February
Party	Candidate	Votes	%	±%
Free Trade	William Holborow (re-elected 1)	975	35.7	
Free Trade	Edward Ball (elected 2)	970	35.5	
Protectionist	Thomas Rose	789	28.9	
Total formal votes		2,734	99.6	
Informal votes		11	0.4	
Turnout		1,723	62.5	

=== 1885 ===
1885 New South Wales colonial election: Argyle Thursday 22 October
Candidate	Votes	%
William Holborow (re-elected 1)	1,165	43.7
Francis Tait (elected 2)	784	29.4
Edward Ball	716	26.9
Total formal votes	2,665	99.8
Informal votes	6	0.2
Turnout	1,449	53.8

The sitting member Sir Henry Parkes successfully contested St Leonards.

=== 1885 by-election ===
1885 Argyle by-election 31 March 1885
Candidate	Votes	%
Henry Parkes (elected)	816	51.3%
John Osborne	775	48.7%
Total formal votes	1,591	97.5
Informal votes	41	2.5
Turnout	1,632	56.0

John Gannon resigned due to ill health.

=== 1882 ===
1882 New South Wales colonial election: Argyle Monday 11 December
Candidate	Votes	%
John Gannon (re-elected 1)	1,323	45.7
William Holborow (re-elected 2)	825	28.5
George Ranken	748	25.8
Total formal votes	2,896	99.6
Informal votes	12	0.4
Turnout	1,610	58.4

=== 1881 by-election ===
1881 Argyle by-election 9 December
Candidate	Votes	%
John Gannon (elected)	933	53.1
Louis Heydon	825	46.9
Total formal votes	1,758	98.5
Informal votes	26	1.5
Turnout	1,784	63.3

Phillip G. Myers died.

=== 1880 ===
1880 New South Wales colonial election: Argyle Friday 26 November
Candidate	Votes	%
William Holborow (elected 1)	1,026	27.5
Phillip G. Myers (elected 2)	992	26.6
Louis Heydon	780	20.9
John Walsh	683	18.3
William Connolly	254	6.8
Total formal votes	3,735	99.2
Informal votes	29	0.8
Turnout	1,976	71.3
	(1 new seat)	

The sitting member William Davies did not contest the election.

=== 1877 ===
1877 New South Wales colonial election: Argyle Thursday 1 November
Candidate	Votes	%
William Davies (elected)	890	61.7
Charles Heydon	553	38.3
Total formal votes	1,443	97.5
Informal votes	37	2.5
Turnout	1,480	60.9

=== 1874 ===
1874–75 New South Wales colonial election: Argyle Saturday 2 January 1875
Candidate	Votes	%
Edward Butler (re-elected)	unopposed	

=== 1872 ===
1872 New South Wales colonial election: Argyle Friday 8 March
Candidate	Votes	%
Edward Butler (re-elected)	unopposed	

=== 1869 ===
1869–70 New South Wales colonial election: Argyle Friday 17 December 1869
Candidate	Votes	%
Edward Butler (elected)	unopposed	

=== 1864 ===
1864–65 New South Wales colonial election: Argyle Friday 16 December 1864
Candidate	Votes	%
Phillip Dignam (elected)	569	52.5
Samuel Emmanuel (defeated)	515	47.5
Total formal votes	1,084	100.0
Informal votes	0	0.0
Turnout	1,084	56.5

=== 1862 by-election ===
1862 Argyle by-election Thursday 30 October
Candidate	Votes	%
Samuel Emmanuel (elected)	unopposed	

Terence Murray was appointed President of the Legislative Council.

=== 1860 ===
1860 New South Wales colonial election: Argyle Saturday 8 December
Candidate	Votes	%
Terence Murray (re-elected)	unopposed	

=== 1859 ===
1859 New South Wales colonial election: Argyle Saturday 18 June
Candidate	Votes	%
Terence Murray (re-elected)	389	74.5
Richard Driver	133	25.5
Total formal votes	389	100.0
Informal votes	522	0.0
Turnout	522	39.6

=== 1858 ===
1858 New South Wales colonial election: Argyle 23 January
Candidate	Votes	%
Daniel Deniehy (re-elected)	unopposed	

=== 1857 by-election ===
1857 Argyle by-election Tuesday 17 February
Candidate	Votes	%
Daniel Deniehy (elected)	unopposed	

John Plunkett was appointed President of the Legislative Council.

=== 1856 ===
1856 New South Wales colonial election: Argyle
Candidate	Votes	%
John Plunkett (elected)	182	52.9
John Chisholm	162	47.1
Columbus Fitzpatrick	0	0.0
Total formal votes	344	100.0
Informal votes	0	0.0
Turnout	344	64.4

Polling was conducted on 31 March 1856. Plunkett served in the old Legislative Council as an appointed member. After failed attempts to win election for Sydney City and North Eastern Boroughs, Plunkett was elected to represent Bathurst (County) on the same day as winning Argyle. After attending the first sitting of Parliament representing both seats, and even attempting to use both votes in the ballot for Speaker, Plunkett resigned as MP for Bathurst (County) and represented Argyle. Sitting Legislative Councillor for County of Argyle was Charles Nicholson who did not contest the election.
