= 1862 Argyle colonial by-election =

By-election in New South Wales, Australia

A by-election was held for the New South Wales Legislative Assembly electorate of Argyle on 30 October 1862 because the seat of Terence Murray was declared vacant due to his appointment as President of the Legislative Council.

== Dates ==
Date	Event
15 October 1862	Terence Murray's seat declared vacant.
15 October 1862	Writ of election issued by the Speaker of the Legislative Assembly.
30 October 1862	Nominations
4 November 1862	Polling day
11 November 1862	Return of writ

== Results ==
1862 Argyle by-election Thursday 30 October
Candidate	Votes	%
Samuel Emmanuel (elected)	unopposed	

== See also ==
- Electoral results for the district of Argyle
- List of New South Wales state by-elections
