= 1885 Argyle colonial by-election =

By-election in New South Wales, Australia

A by-election was held for the New South Wales Legislative Assembly electorate of Argyle on 31 March 1885 because of the resignation of John Gannon resigned due to ill health.

== Dates ==
Date	Event
17 March 1888	John Gannon resigned.
17 March 1885	Writ of election issued by the Speaker of the Legislative Assembly.
27 March 1885	Nominations
31 March 1885	Polling day
7 April 1885	Return of writ

== Results ==
1885 Argyle by-election 31 March 1885
Candidate	Votes	%
Henry Parkes (elected)	816	51.3%
John Osborne	775	48.7%
Total formal votes	1,591	97.5
Informal votes	41	2.5
Turnout	1,632	56.0

== See also ==
- Electoral results for the district of Argyle
- List of New South Wales state by-elections
