= 1881 Argyle colonial by-election =

By-election in New South Wales, Australia

A by-election was held for the New South Wales Legislative Assembly electorate of Argyle on 9 December 1881 because of the death of Phillip G. Myers on 16 November 1881.

== Dates ==
Date	Event
16 November 1881	Phillip G. Myers died.
23 November 1881	Writ of election issued by the Speaker of the Legislative Assembly.
5 December 1881	Nominations
9 December 1881	Polling day
15 December 1881	Return of writ

== Results ==
1881 Argyle by-election 9 December
Candidate	Votes	%
John Gannon (elected)	933	53.1
Louis Heydon	825	46.9
Total formal votes	1,758	98.5
Informal votes	26	1.5
Turnout	1,784	63.3

== See also ==
- Electoral results for the district of Argyle
- List of New South Wales state by-elections
