= St Clair, Goulburn =

Former residence and museum in Goulburn, New South Wales, Australia

St Clair
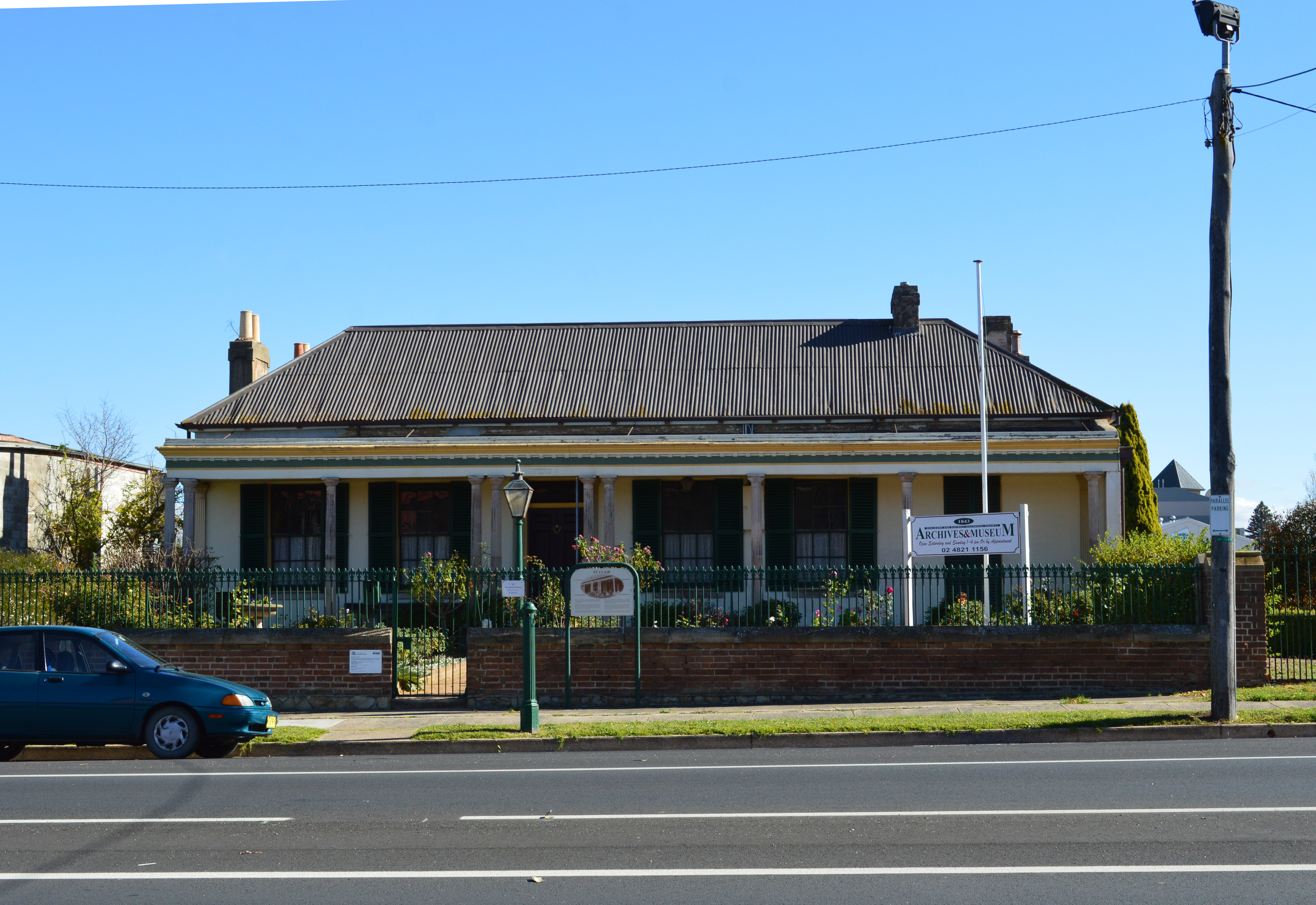

- Location within New South Wales Location within Australia
- 34.7510°S 149.7239°E
- Location: 318 Sloane Street, Goulburn, Goulburn Mulwaree Council, New South Wales, Australia

History
- Built: 1840–1840

Site notes
- Architect: James Sinclair
- Owner: Goulburn Mulwaree Council

New South Wales Heritage Register
- Official name: St. Clair; St Clair Cottage; St Clair Museum
- Type: state heritage (built)
- Designated: 2 April 1999
- Reference no.: 117
- Type: Villa
- Category: Residential buildings (private)
- Builders: James Sinclair

St Clair is a heritage-listed site, former residence, and now museum at 318 Sloane Street, Goulburn, Goulburn Mulwaree Council, New South Wales, Australia. It was designed by James Sinclair, who built the house in 1840. It is the second-oldest house in Goulburn, after Riversdale. It is also known as St Clair Cottage and St Clair Museum. The property is owned by Goulburn Mulwaree Council and houses the Goulburn and District Historical Society. It was added to the New South Wales State Heritage Register on 2 April 1999.

== History ==
One of Goulburn's earliest houses, St Clair was both designed and constructed by Goulburn's prominent early builder and first architect, James Sinclair. The land was purchased in 1843 and the house was built in two or three stages with completion before 1849. During this time the stage one shingle roof was covered with iron. The first stage of the house consists of four rooms at entrance level, over two downstairs rooms, two cellar rooms and an unusual larder. A second and possibly third stage added two wings containing eight more rooms, a kitchen and scullery. These wings were enclosed to form a courtyard.

Sinclair lived at St Clair until 1851 when, in financial difficulties, he left for the Victorian goldfields and was never heard of again. He is believed to have been robbed and murdered near Ovens.

Sinclair almost certainly owned John Claudius Loudon's "Cottage Architecture" (sic) first edition in the late 1830s. Sinclair also designed a similar Goulburn cottage for his friend and business acquaintance John James Woodward. This cottage also had a more utilitarian Greek Revival verandah fronting a relatively straight forward Georgian cottage. It was designed late 1840s prior to Sinclair's disappearance, but not built until the late 1850s.

In 1852 St Clair was purchased by storekeeper, Joseph Bull, for 600 pounds and Bull lived in the house until his death in 1871.

The stables, coach house and hay loft were built c. 1870 for Joseph Bull.

His widow Elizabeth continued to reside there until 1876 when Edward Ball, twice Mayor of Goulburn and member of the New South Wales Legislative Assembly for Argyle, bought the residence. Ball, it seems, lived in a portion of the house and leased a section. A Dr. Carroll had a consulting room there prior to 1882.

In 1883 a school for girls was being run at St Clair by Mrs Emric and her two daughters the Misses Crackenthrope. In the late 1880s a Miss Sharp taught music, piano, organ, harmonium, harp, French and drawing at the house. After the death of Edward Ball senior in 1894 St Clair was passed on to his son Edward Joseph Ball Junior.

In 1900 St Clair was bought by Bridget Bruton, wife of J. J. Bruton, of the Royal Hotel, who lived there for some years. From this period onwards St Clair was run as a guesthouse. In the period 1908 to 1910 St Clair was rented by Mr Boissier, the local Government Architect of the day. On Mrs Bruton's death it passed to her daughter Mrs Ruby Egar, who rented the large house.

Historic photos indicate that the site had the odd bush and tree but was quite disturbed by early 20th century.

The McCarthy family ran it as a guesthouse from around 1912 until 1922 when it was purchased from Mrs Egar by Horace Oliver Pursehouse. The Pursehouse family continued to run it as a guesthouse, their daughter, Mrs Thirlby McDonell continued the business after her parents death and eventually set up the house as bedsitters or flatettes until her death in 1966. Some fibro internal wall cladding was added during the 1950s and 1960s. McDonell's two sons then sold the property after her death.

In 1970, to commemorate the 150th Anniversary of Governor Macquarie's visit to Goulburn in 1820, a grant of $10,000 was made by the Premier's Department of NSW to the Goulburn City Council, to be used for an historical purpose within the city. St. Clair at this time was facing demolition. The Goulburn and District Historical Society persuaded Council to purchase St Clair, using the Premier's Department funds and to devote the balance of any moneys towards its restoration. The title is vested in the City Council.

Soon after St Clair became the headquarters for the Goulburn and District Historical Society. They are now joined by the Friends of St Clair in preserving the significant collection and archival research centre.

St Clair was restored during the 1980s, at which time some lathe and plaster ceilings were lined over and some cement render was used to replace missing plaster.

== Description ==
House

St Clair is a split-level 18 room colonial villa. It is of solid brick construction, rendered, with internal plaster lining in all ground floor rooms. Ceilings and first floor internal walls are of lath and plaster. Internal doors architraves and skirting boards are red cedar. Verandah columns are fluted sandstone, while shutters and veranda linings are red cedar.

The first stage of the house consists of four rooms at entrance level, over two downstairs rooms, two cellar rooms and an unusual larder. A second and possibly third stage added two wings containing eight more rooms, a kitchen and scullery. These wings were enclosed to form a courtyard.

St Clair is a typical example of the early provincial colonial villa of the 1840s. In many respects it is unique as in particular it has never at any period been structurally interfered with.

In common with the majority of country homes of the period the elegance and grandeur depreciates as one moves towards the back of the building and the downstairs areas. What at first sight appears to be perhaps a reasonably sized cottage is, in fact, almost duplicated in size at the lower level. The house is of the "split level" variety with three district floor levels and comprises about 18 rooms in all. The centre and almost square hall accommodates the rather narrow and uninviting staircase. The layout downstairs would not appear to permit the most accommodating domestic arrangement and would certainly have kept the housewife and maids constantly occupied.

St Clair also shows many examples of colonial architecture and building methods. These include the fluted sandstone columns, lathe and plaster ceilings and walls, wooden shingle roof in stage one (later covered by iron in stage two) and shingle soundproofing in the upstairs floors.

Outbuildings/Site

Historic photos indicate that the site had the odd bush and tree but was quite disturbed by early 20th century.

A small front garden lies between the front facade of St.Clair and Sloane Street. The site slopes away and down from the street, meaning the house is two storied at the rear. Behind the house is a stable, carriage store and servants quarters set in a windless arrangement. The stable and quarters are currently used as flats.

Condition

St Clair has not seen significant physical alteration over the past 150 years. It is in relatively original condition with only minor modern intrusions. These include some cement render, 1980s, and some fibro sheeting over deteriorating plaster walls, 1960s. Out buildings, stables etc, warrant further archaeological investigation.

St Clair, while largely structurally sound, it has suffered from many years of rising damp, partly due to its semi buried walls, but mostly due to early cladding of down stairs and cellar walls. This had the effect of hiding the decaying bricks and plaster from view until damage was well advanced.

An original brick well/tank in the wagon shed has been filled in and may contain early artefacts.

The brick paving in front of the stables has been covered with aggregate and since grown over with grass.

== Heritage listing ==
St Clair is a typical example of the early provincial colonial villa of its period. Built in three stages between 1843 and 1849, it has not been structurally altered or interfered with over the ensuing years. St Clair is within the Goulburn CBD and is one of the city's oldest residences.

St Clair was listed on the New South Wales State Heritage Register on 2 April 1999.
