= Lansdowne Park, Goulburn =

Lansdowne
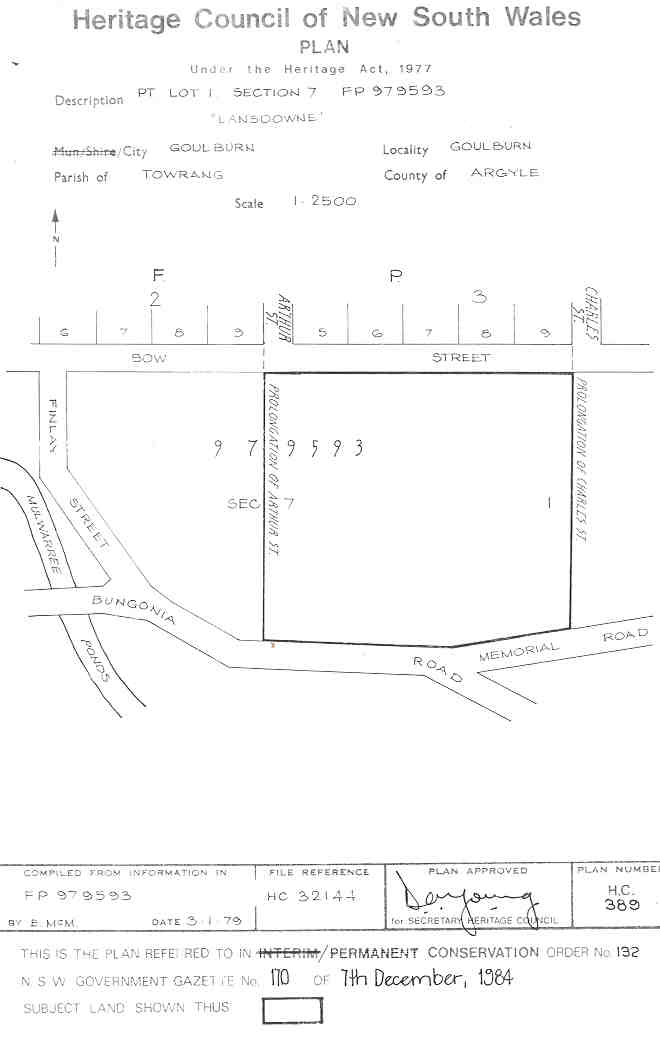
- Heritage boundaries

- Location within New South Wales Location within Australia
- 34.7685°S 149.7268°E
- Location: Bungonia Road, Goulburn, New South Wales, Australia

History
- Built: 1822–1825

Site notes
- Owner: Neville and Irene Lee

New South Wales Heritage Register
- Official name: Lansdowne; Lansdowne Park; Synagogue and 3 Cottages
- Type: state heritage (landscape)
- Designated: 2 April 1999
- Reference no.: 132
- Type: Homestead Complex
- Category: Farming and Grazing

Lansdowne Park is a heritage-listed homestead at Bungonia Road, Goulburn, New South Wales, Australia. It was built from 1822 to 1825. It is also known as Lansdowne. It was added to the New South Wales State Heritage Register on 2 April 1999.

== History ==
Jonas Bradley had settled previously at Windsor Road (Sydney) on a grant of 25 acres. For this property, he had been granted stock from the Government Herds in 1811. In return he was a regular supplier of meat to the Government Stores at Windsor. In this location he initiated the growing of tobacco in commercial quantities.

The first award ever made by the fledgling Agricultural Society was a silver quart tankard given to Jonas Bradley in 1823 "in recognition of his cultivation of tobacco and his offer to lay before the Society a statement of his mode of culture, cure and manufacture". A hundredweight of tobacco was presented to the Society to be sent to England in the brig "Bathurst". This statement to the Society was published in the Sydney Gazette on 2- February 1823 and again on 22 May.

The land which Jonas occupied at this time was considered by him to be "too poor and limited in size" to enable him to cultivate tobacco to the extent he wished. As a consequence he petitioned Governor Brisbane in 1822 for a grant of land in the Burragorang district where he proposed to "cultivate tobacco to a considerable extent, as the soil is extremely suitable for that purpose". Jonas Bradley then went on to become the first to plant and harvest tobacco as a crop in the Goulburn district. In 1836, 1.5 tons of tobacco was harvested from Lansdowne.

In 1836 William Bradley opened a brewery complex at the base of the hill below Lansdowne homestead and between 1836 and 1840 a steam-powered mill had been added. This was one of the first steam powered industries in the colony. The mill, when completed in 1838, processed about 100,000 bushels of wheat per annum. In 1852 the price of flour in Goulburn rose from 21 to 29 pounds whilst wheat was selling at 10/- a bushel. Flour milled at Bradley's mill in 1854 realised "first 35 pounds per ton, second 34 pounds, third 33 pounds, Bran 3/- per bushel". Due to collusion the price from the other major mill in the town, Byrnes and Oaker's was the same. Both the brewery and mill were managed by William Shelley who was in partnership with Bradley. Shelley died in 1844, aged 39, at Lansdowne Park. After Bradley's death in 1868 the complex was sold to Messrs Walford, Sparks & Emanuel who continued the milling but ceased the brewery operation. Emanuel was also the purchaser of Lansdowne at this time. The new owners sold on to Messrs Bartlett and Oddy who operated only the brewery.

Jonas' scientific approach to agriculture was shared by William - inspired by his father's interest in and knowledge of tobacco, he is reputed to have developed a nicotine based treatment for scab in sheep that led to the eradication of scab from NSW flocks. Bradley's work on scab and catarrh for the sheep industry is ranked equal in importance to that of Farrar's for rust in the wheat industry.

Bradley also introduced the first Southdown (coarse haired) sheep to NSW in the Monaro.

== Description ==
Lansdowne Park is Goulburn's oldest homestead and property, and includes ballroom, convict built coach house and stables, convict jail and guests' quarters.

Estate

Reduced in scale, but still an agricultural property with paddocks of grass running adjacent to Bungonia Road and the Mulwaree Chain of Ponds (river), and more recently a vineyard block north of the house. Homestead complex is on a small hill above the river and north of the road. Former property straddled the river with the Flour Mill & Brewery & Malt House complex to the west and further fields to the north. Shelter belts of Monterey pine (Pinus radiata), Monterey cypress (Cupressus macrocarpa), black locust (Robinia pseudoacacia), stone pine (Pinus pinea)

House

Single storey colonial style hipped roof (corrugated iron today, shingles originally) U-shaped house in lapped timber boards, cedar fireplace mantels and much internal joinery, stringybark/spotted gum floorboards, open verandahs on three sides, two side verandahs filled in (south) and part-filled in (north). Rear north-east corner has brick additions for kitchen/pantry/office. South side verandah infilled for bedrooms. Several fireplaces in brick.

Ballroom

Single storey double height stud building north of house, in random rubble stone construction, corrugated iron roof (today), with ornamental grape (Vitis coignetae) on one side. Timber dance floor inside. Crystal chandeliers, ornate ceiling cornices, large cedar framed windows, open fireplace.

Coach house/store

Random rubble stone (quarried from the surrounding hills) construction two storey building with gabled roof, side gable in centre of long western ('front') facade facing main house. Corrugated iron roof has replaced shingles. Timber door detailing, lintels over windows, Victorian gothic revival barge boards decorations in timber also. Interior downstairs plastered and painted over stone (external walls) and brick (internal divider walls). Fireplace in one room, in brick. Upper floor lath and plaster. Side staircase on external northern wall. Used by Cobb & Co. coaches. To the east of the house, to the south of the stables/barn block below.

Stables/Barn

Random rubble stone (quarried from the surrounding hills) construction 2 storey building with gabled roof, side gable over main entry in southern long facade. Original elaborate timber horse stalls marked by posts finished with carved capitals, feeder trough bins in timber, beneath an internal arcade of timber on octagonal pillars down centre, and stone cobble floor in ground level. Timber floored upper level. Timber detailing as for above stables/store block. Much of the timber is cedar. Southern (main) facade has two oval brick-lined windows on upper floor level. The building's top floor was originally only accessible by an inside ladder, apart from the external doors to hoist hay/stores up from outside. A new circular staircase was added to access the top floor at the eastern end c. 2005.

Servants Quarters (convict built)

Long low single storey block north of house, brick with corrugated iron roof. Internal walls dividing separate 'cells'/rooms opened up to allow some shared access. Used now for accommodation of guests in rustic style. Several fireplaces in brick. Low Picket fence around.

Meat/Slaughter house

East of Servants' Quarters, brick construction single storey simple box construction, corrugated iron roof.

Convict Gaol

Random rubble stone (quarried from the surrounding hills) construction, open stable component (majority of structure) and small room on northern side with brick fireplace. Was without a roof for a century or so, recently re-roofed, walls repaired/reconstructed and restored.

Worker's cottage

Rear of (east) other building complex, on its own with paddocks around. Single storey brick, verandah on western side. Chimney on northern side of centre.

Outbuilding

North of Barn/Stables pair. Single storey "lean to" style building, with open porch style southern half in timber posts and iron roof, rubble stone northern half, former shed converted to greenhouse with glass roof now. Adjoins vineyard block.

Farm Cottage

North of above complex, on its own beside the vineyard. Single storey brick, corrugated iron roof, verandah on western side and southern return. Small garden to west of main facade. Low Picket fence around.

Synagogue

Strange almost square brick building, in middle of vineyard today, north-east of house. Northern wall has semi-circular protruding section with pointed gothic arched window spaces (3) - in ruins as a shell today. No roof. Walls of brick in places retain plaster. Bricks made on the property.

== Heritage listing ==
Lansdowne homestead and surrounding precinct is of outstanding heritage significance. It has been associated with the development of Goulburn since the earliest days of exploration in the area and was one of the first properties settled in the area south of the Cumberland basin. It provides physical evidence of its establishment and occupation by one of the most powerful men in the colony who played an important role in shaping the development of NSW.

The homestead is a scarce example of an early timber colonial homestead with its "U" plan, high-pitched roof and encircling verandah. The fabric provides rare physical evidence of early timber building techniques used in the colony.

Lansdowne has retained extensive evidence of its early period of development along with evidence of most of the outbuildings which once supported the house. It provides evidence of early colonial life, including all facets of human activity. The homestead forms part of an intact group of buildings which have the potential to provide a complete vignette of 19th century rural life and activity.

The property exhibits strong associations with the Aboriginal population as it was used as both a meeting place and burial ground. It was also a place of primary contact between Aboriginal and European peoples.

The property provides physical evidence of the close association with one of the earliest industrial enterprises in Goulburn.

Lansdowne's location on a spur overlooking the flood plain has enabled a strong relationship to develop between the city and the rural hinterland. The property has largely retained its rural curtilage and yet continues to define the boundary between the town and rural land as Bradley's properties have done for over 160 years (to 1997).

It is a rare example of a pastoral, industrial and political empire, providing information of the development and concomitant development of the colony. It demonstrates the characteristics associated with important pioneering family homesteads.

The site has the potential to provide valuable archaeological information about both Aboriginal and European periods of occupation.

Lansdowne was listed on the New South Wales State Heritage Register on 2 April 1999.
