= William Faithfull =

Australian politician and pastoralist

William Pitt Faithfull
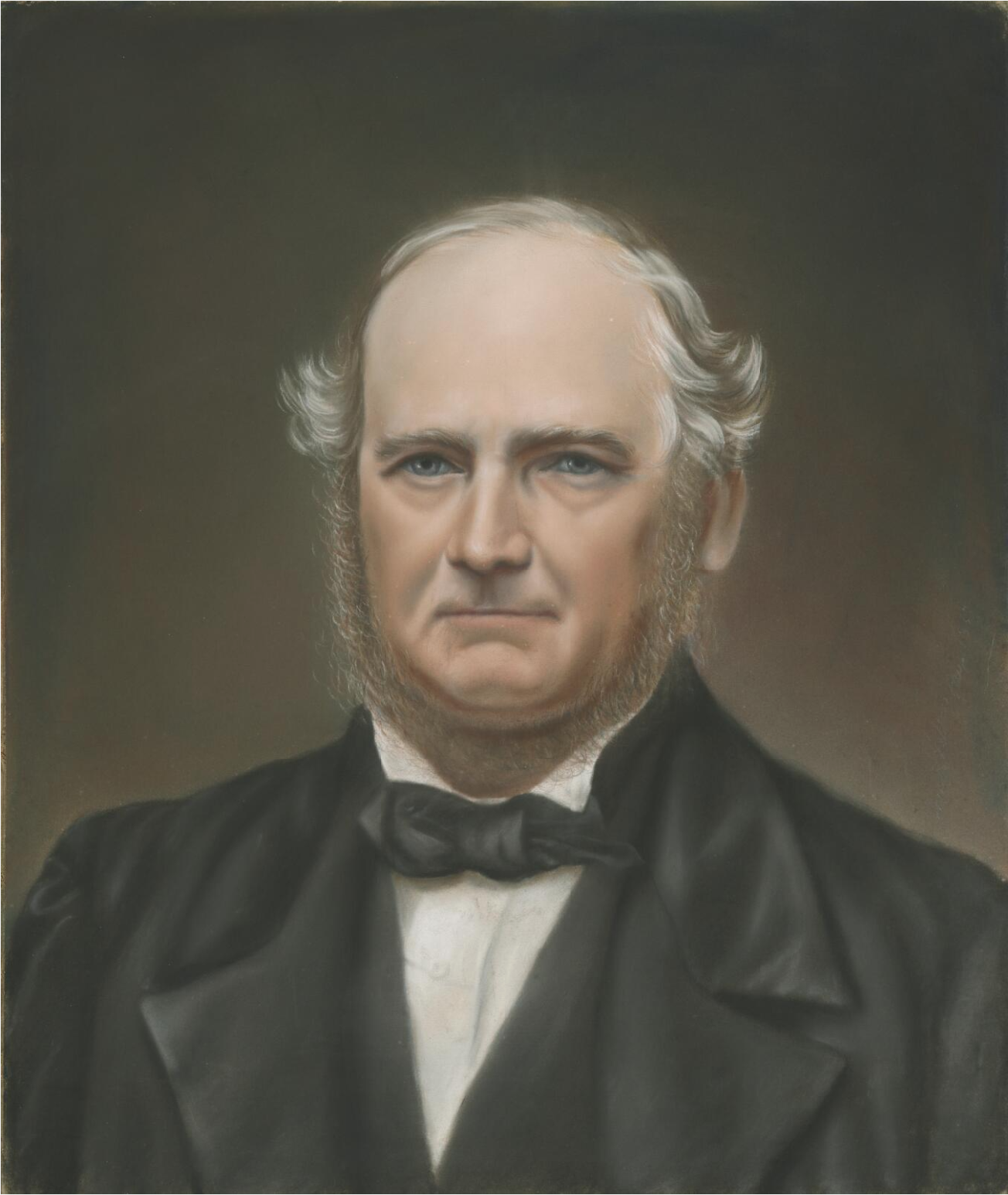
- William Pitt Faithfull, 1867 portrait by Myra Felton.

New South Wales Legislative Council
- In office 1 July 1846 – 20 June 1848
- Preceded by: William Bradley
- Succeeded by: Charles Nicholson

New South Wales Legislative Council
- In office 22 May 1856 – 10 May 1861

Personal details
- Born: William Pitt Faithfull; 11 October 1806 Richmond, New South Wales
- Died: 24 April 1896 (aged 89) 'Springfield', near Goulburn, New South Wales
- Spouse: Mary Deane (m. 1844)

William Pitt Faithfull (11 October 1806 – 24 April 1896) was an Australian politician and pastoralist, the son of a landholder. Faithfull began to acquire grants and leaseholds of land in the Goulburn Plains district from the late 1820s. Within a decade he had settled at the 'Springfield' pastoral estate where he established a merino sheep stud. In the late 1830s and early 1840s William P. Faithfull and his younger brother George established pastoral runs in the Port Phillip District, south of the Murray River, a process that involved conflicts with the local aborigines, including retaliatory killings of the indigenous inhabitants.

In the period 1846 to 1848 Faithfull served as the member for the Argyle district of the New South Wales Legislative Council. In 1856 he was appointed to the Legislative Council after responsible self-government under a bicameral system was established in the colony of New South Wales. In 1861, as part of a group of twenty conservative Council members, he resigned in protest at the intention by the elected New South Wales government to appoint new members to the Legislative Council in order to pass land reform legislation.

== Biology ==
=== Early life ===
William Faithfull was born on 11 October 1806 at Richmond, the eldest of five children of William Faithfull and Susannah (née Pitt). His father was a landholder who had arrived in the colony of New South Wales as a British Army soldier in 1792.^{[A]}

Faithfull left school, aged fifteen, and began work as a clerk in the office of his uncle, Robert Jenkins, a Sydney merchant. After his uncle's death, from a fall from his horse in May 1822, Faithfull "took up country pursuits". He gained initial experience by working as the overseer of Berkeley Farm in the Illawarra region, south of Sydney, owned by his aunt Jemima Jenkins (née Pitt), the widow of his late uncle.

=== Goulburn Plains ===
In 1827 Faithfull applied for a grant of land from the New South Wales colonial government. Based on his assessed capital of £2,232, in 1828 he was granted 1,280 acres (518 hectares) of land in the Gundary district of the Goulburn Plains, part of the territory of the Gandangara people, 17 kilometres (10.5 miles) south of the newly established township of Goulburn (where barracks for troopers of the New South Wales Mounted Police had been built). The land taken up by Faithfull, known by the aboriginal people as 'Coorangangennoe', was fertile grassland upon which he sought to establish a sheep station. The early years of pastoral settlement of the district was marked by tense and violent relations between the Gandangara people and the settlers. In July 1828, after two murdered stock-keepers had been discovered in the bush, The Australian newspaper reported: "The native blacks in the neighbourhood of Goulburn Plains appear again disposed to be troublesome". In April 1829 Faithfull was given official approval to graze his sheep on land adjoining his property (totalling five thousand acres). In 1833 Faithfull had a convict brickmaker assigned to him.

During the period 1835 to 1837 Faithfull acquired additional land on the Mulwaree Chain of Ponds in Argyle county. In August 1836 he was granted 1,280 acres (518 hectares) "commencing at Mulwaree Ponds". In 1836 he was appointed as a justice of the peace.

By 1837 Faithfull's pastoral estate had been named 'Springfield'. In September 1837 he was appointed as a Commissioner of Crown Lands. In 1838 Faithfull selected ten rams from William Macarthur's Camden Park stud flock in order to establish a merino sheep stud at 'Springfield'.

=== The Port Phillip district ===
In 1837, with the 'Springfield' station in drought, William P. Faithfull and his younger brother George (born in 1814) decided to overland stock south of the Murray River to the Port Phillip District, recently approved for settlement by the governor of New South Wales, Sir Richard Bourke. The brothers had the intention of establishing a pastoral run and by early 1838 George Faithfull had set out with mobs of cattle and sheep, travelling to the Ovens River by the newly established route to the south. After arriving at the junction of the Ovens and King rivers, south of the Murray River, he inspected the nearby Oxley Plains where he decided to graze his cattle, sending the sheep ahead under the charge of a party of stockmen and shepherds.

In April 1838 a party of men, fifteen in number and led by Willam Faithfull's overseer (a ticket-of-leave man named James Crossley), was camped beside the Broken River (near to the later settlement of Benalla) in charge of a mob of sheep. The convict stockmen and shepherds were on their way south to the "new country" of the Port Phillip region, but were camped at the river awaiting the arrival of George Faithfull. On the morning of 11 April the shepherds in charge of the sheep, grazing a short distance away, were seen running towards the camp "pursued by a body of blacks throwing spears after them". Three of Faithfull's men had guns, which proved to be of little use as the Waywurru aboriginal men sheltered behind trees as they advanced upon the camp. After some close fighting seven of the stockmen were killed, and at least one aborigine was killed by musket fire. The remainder of the overlanding party (including Crossley) managed to escape, including one who later died of his wounds. George Faithfull, together with Colonel Henry White, were camped at a crossing place on the Ovens River where they were joined by one of the survivors, a day after the attack. The other survivors were met near the Broken River by Alfred Langhorne on his way north to Sydney. The incident became known as the 'battle of Broken River' and also the 'Faithfull massacre'.^{[B]}

After the attack on Faithfull's men at Broken River large numbers of aborigines were killed in several reprisal raids. About ten days after the incident a heavily armed group of about fifty men led by Peter Snodgrass surrounded a large group of indigenous men, women and children gathered for a ceremony of initiation rites on open flat ground adjoining the King River. The overlanders shot and killed members of the group as they tried to escape by leaping into the water. Some sources name George Faithfull as being present at the attack on the ceremonial gathering.

In June 1838 the Faithfull brothers and other squatters with stations along the Port Phillip route petitioned Governor Gipps to launch a counter-attack against aborigines who "have assumed a hostile attitude... and committed many outrages". Gipps refused the request, agreeing only to establish additional mounted police posts at key locations along the road from Yass to Port Phillip for the protection of settlers along the route. He explained that "the aboriginal natives" were to be treated "as subjects of Her Majesty" and he had no power "to authorise the levying of war against them, or to give sanction to any measures of indiscriminate retaliation". Gipps concluded by stating that "it must be evident that every wanderer in search of pasturage cannot be attended by military force".

In early September 1838 Rev. Joseph Docker, after resigning as chaplain of St. Matthew's Anglican church at Windsor, arrived at the Ovens River planning to take up land in the Port Phillip district. He was met there by George Faithfull, who informed Docker that he and his brother had abandoned their 'Bontharambo Plains' pastoral run "because of difficulties with the natives". Docker inspected the run (located near the later township of Wangaratta) and agreed to accept the risk and take over the lease from the Faithfull brothers. The Faithfull brothers also occupied a run of eleven thousand acres in an area that became known as Faithfull's Creek (in north-east Victoria between the later townships of Euroa and Violet Town).

In 1841 eighteen men employed by the Faithfull brothers – stockmen, shepherds and hutkeepers, all of them mounted and armed – undertook a punitive attack upon the local aborigines. They surrounded a Waywurru camp on the banks of the King River and massacred the inhabitants. It was estimated that one hundred aborigines were killed at the camp and those that escaped the initial onslaught were pursued up the river and killed, with only three individuals managing to escape.

By October 1843 William P. Faithfull had been appointed as Warden for the Goulburn district. William Pitt Faithfull and Mary Deane were married on 20 January 1844 at St. James' church in Sydney. The couple had nine children born from October 1844 to June 1859 (six sons and three daughters).^{[C]}

The 'Oxley's Plains' pastoral run, leased by William P. and George Faithfull, was gazetted in 1848. The area was estimated to be ninety-two thousand acres, nearby to the newly established township of Wangaratta. It included frontage to both the King and Ovens rivers, bordered by mountainous country to the south and east. George Faithfull also held 'Heifer' station, over twenty-six thousand acres with a capacity of five hundred head of cattle, located at the junction of the Ovens and Buffalo rivers (with frontage to both). 'Oxley Plains' pastoral run was occupied by George Faithfull who lived there until his death in 1855.

=== Member for Argyle ===
In July 1846 William P. Faithfull was elected as a member of the New South Wales Legislative Council, representing the county of Argyle electoral district. He was the sole candidate for the position and replaced William Bradley who had resigned.

By June 1848 Faithfull had made it known that he would not be seeking re-election to the Legislative Council. He supported the candidature of Charles Nicholson, who was elected in his place.

William P. Faithfull's younger brother George died in late October 1855 at his station near Wangaratta, the cause of death recorded as an "abcess on the liver".

=== Land reform ===
In late 1855 the New South Wales constitution was passed into law by the British parliament, allowing for responsible self-government for the colony under a bicameral system with an elected Legislative Assembly and an appointed Legislative Council, with the elected government taking over most of the legislative powers of the Governor. The new Legislative Council was to consist of no fewer than twenty-one members nominated by the Governor (on the advice of his Executive Council), initially appointed for five years. After the five year period had expired, the constitution stipulated that all future Council members would hold their seats "for the term of their natural lives". Faithfull was one of thirty-one men appointed by the New South Wales governor Sir William Denison and summoned to take their seats in the first Legislative Council within the new bicameral parliamentary system. The two houses of parliament of New South Wales sat for the first time on 22 May 1856.

After the New South Wales election of December 1860 the premier John Robertson had a clear majority in the Legislative Assembly to enable the passage of his land reforms to allow the free selection of Crown lands (even if it were being leased by a pastoralist). In January 1861 Robertson handed the premiership to Charles Cowper in order to focus on completing the drafting of his land reform legislation as Secretary for Lands. After the bills were passed in the Legislative Assembly in late March, Robertson resigned his seat and on 2 April he was appointed to the Legislative Council by the governor, Sir John Young, for the purpose of guiding the legislation through the Upper House.

The Legislative Council was largely made up of landowners and their allies who were resolutely opposed to many of the measures in the land reform bills (the Crown Lands Alienation Act and the Crown Lands Occupation Act). It was expected that the Council in its present form would amend the legislation to prevent a selector from picking out land upon a leased run and thus undermine a central principle of the reforms. In May 1861, in the last week before the prorogation of the Legislative Council, it became known that the Cowper government intended to allow the five-year terms to lapse of the Council members appointed in May 1856, and appoint twenty-one new members to the Council in order to pass the land reform legislation without any substantial amendments. On 10 May the president of the Legislative Council, Sir William Burton, resigned in protest when he became aware of "an intention to swamp the House by the appointment of a number of new members". Burton's resignation was immediately followed by the resignation in protest of nineteen other Council members, including Faithfull.^{[D]}

=== Later years ===
By 1867 W. P. Faithfull was leasing 'Brewarrina', a pastoral station east of Narrandera with frontage to the Murrumbidgee River. In July 1867 and January 1868 he purchased parcels of land on 'Brewarrina', permitted under the 'Crown Lands Alienation Act of 1861'.

During 1889 Faithfull's wife Mary "had been seriously ailing... from a weakness of the heart". Mary Faithfull died on 10 December 1889 at 'Springfield', aged 76, "after a long and painful illness".

William Pitt Faithfull died on 24 April 1896 at 'Springfield', aged 89. The cause of his death was reported as "senile decay, and his end was very peaceful". Faithfull left an estate worth £335,253 with 'Springfield', grown to over 20,000 acres (8094 ha), 'Brewarrina' station, and land in Melbourne, Wangaratta, Mittagong and Sydney.

== Notes ==
A.William Faithfull (born in 1774 at Hampshire, England) arrived in the colony of New South Wales in February 1792, as a private in the New South Wales Corps. He was discharged from the army in 1799, after which he was employed by Colonel Joseph Foveaux in the management of Foveaux's extensive farms and pastoral runs. When Foveaux left the colony in 1801, Faithfull was given part of his sheep flock and personal property. He was granted twenty-five acres at Petersham Hill. Faithfull married Susannah Pitt in November 1804 at Parramatta. In 1808 Faithfull received a grant of one thousand acres at Liberty Plains. He later exchanged this holding for land at Jordan Hills in the Richmond district, where he settled with his family. His wife Susannah died in 1820, after which he married her sister (but the marriage was later annulled). In November 1821 Faithfull married Margaret Thompson of Bringelly. Margaret Faithfull died in July 1842. Faithfull then married Maria Bell in June 1843 at Richmond. William Faithfull died on 16 April 1847 at 'Lake Ville', his residence at Richmond, aged 73.

B.Reports and estimates of the number of aborigines attacking the Broken River camp vary from twenty to as high as 150. Crossley's stockmen may have been followed to the Broken River by the aboriginal men after an incident two days earlier at the Ovens River, when a group of aborigines had speared cattle and were fired upon by the white stockmen. Others have speculated that the stockmen and local aborigines had quarrelled after there had been sexual encounters between the stockmen and indigenous women.

C.Mary Deane was born in 1813 in county Devon, England, the youngest daughter of Thomas Deane and Ann (née Pidsley).

D.In June 1861 twenty-three new members were appointed to the New South Wales Legislative Council. The Legislative Council reconvened on 3 September 1861. The land reform legislation was passed by the Upper House and both acts became law in October 1961. The secretary of state for the colonies disapproved of Governor Young's action, believing that he had involved the vice-regal office in politics and encouraged the "democratic cause".

New South Wales Legislative Council
Preceded by William Bradley	Member for County of Argyle; Jul 1846 – Jun 1848	Succeeded by Charles Nicholson
