= Myra Felton =

Australian photographer and portrait painter (1835–1920)

- Born: 15 April 1835
- Died: 1920 (aged 84–85); Paddington
- Occupation: Painter, photographer

Myra Felton (1835–1920) was an Australian photographer and oil painter, and one of the first independent professional women photographers in colonial Australia. She garnered recognition during her lifetime for her artistic talents, contributions to art education, and involvement in exhibitions.

== Early life ==
Myra Felton was born on April 15, 1835, Liverpool, England, as the second daughter of Amelia and Dr. Maurice Felton (1805-1842). She arrived in Sydney at four years of age on 27 September 1839, aboard the Royal Admiral, alongside her parents, unmarried aunt, brother Maurice, and two sisters, Louisa and Ellisara.

Her father, Maurice Felton was a surgeon and also a talented oil painter. His portrait of Conrad Martens is in the collection of the State Library of New South Wales, while other works are held in the Art Gallery of New South Wales, National Gallery of Australia and National Portrait Gallery.

After her father's death in 1842, Myra Felton worked as a photographic artist, colouring photographs for studios in Sydney. She studied under Marshall Claxton, while he was in Sydney between 1850 and 1854, and she may have learned oil painting from James Armstrong Wilson.

== Career ==
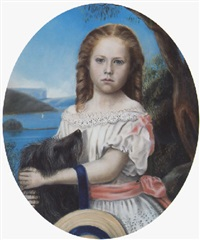
Portrait of a young girl with scotch terrier by Myra Felton

Felton quickly became proficient in photography and oil painting. She specialised in portraiture, particularly colouring over photographs in oils as well as painting originals in pastel and oils. In January 1859, she opened her own studio, Miss M. Felton's Photographic Gallery, in the family home on Hunter Street in Sydney. She moved her studio and gallery several times in and around the city during her lifetime. The establishment of an independent studio made Felton one of the first independent professional women photographers in colonial Australia.

By 1867 she was advertising her services in newspapers as an "Artist and Portrait Painter in dry colours".

In addition to her artistic practice, Myra Felton founded an Art Academy in Sydney, where she taught painting and drawing. By 1869 she was teaching privately, and was also employed as a drawing and art teacher in schools.

She exhibited her works in various exhibitions throughout her career, gaining recognition and praise from art critics and the public alike and was an active member of the New South Wales Academy of Art.

Beyond visual arts, Felton authored a somewhat-romanticised semi-autobiographical novel published in 1887 with proceeds going to the Queens Fund for "distressed women".

== Later life and legacy ==
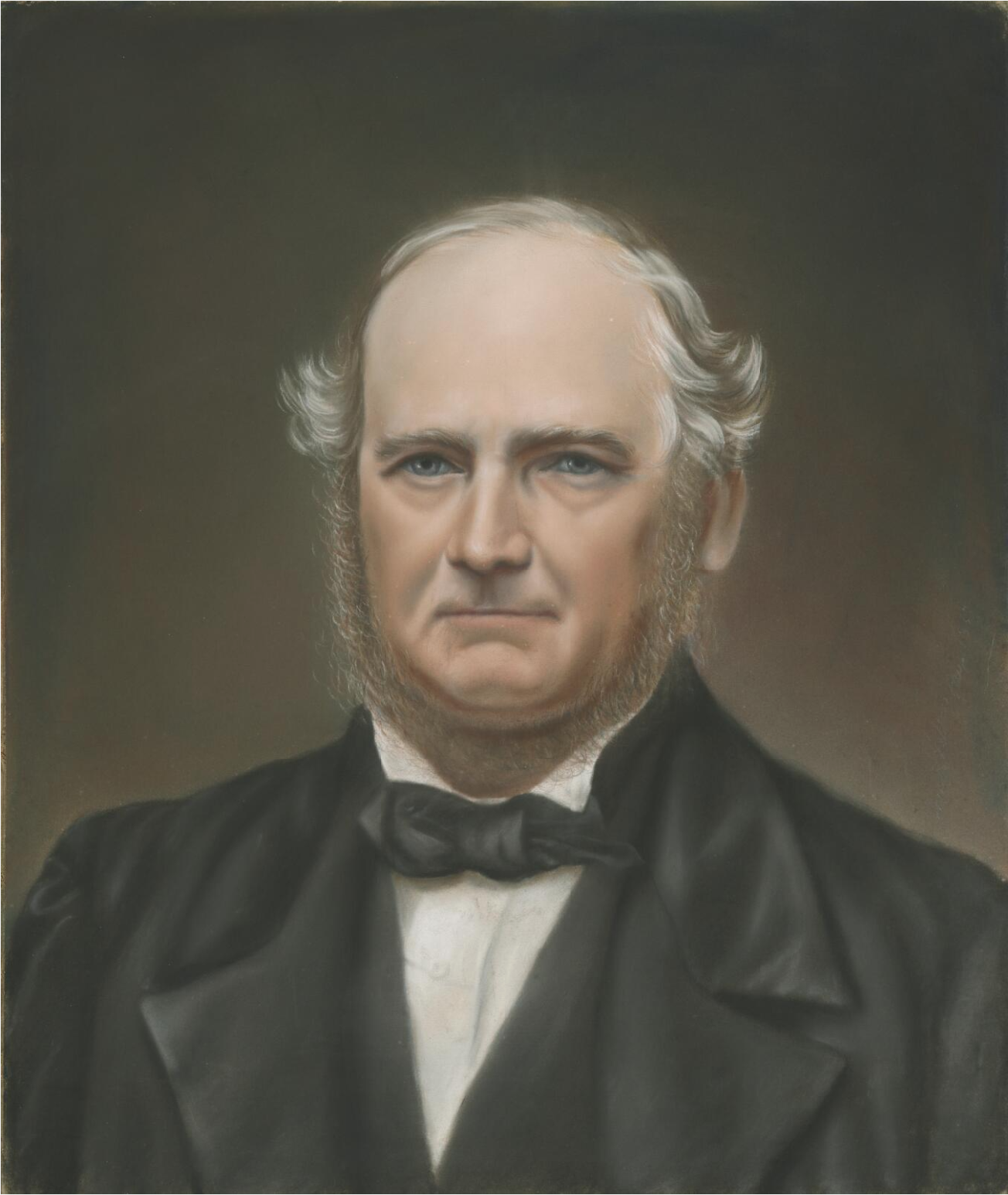
Portrait of William Pitt Faithfull by Myra Felton.

Felton continued her artistic endeavours but largely disappears from public life around 1888. Her work is held in several national collections in Australia.

She resided primarily in Paddington, New South Wales, until her death on 13 July 1920.

Well known works of Myra Felton include:

- pastel portrait of William Pitt Faithfull which is in the collection of the National Library of Australia.
- portraits of Alice Gibson and Mary Faithfull (and other members of the Faithfull family) are in the collection of the National Museum of Australia.
- oil portrait of Samuel Wensley Blackall, Governor of Queensland, was painted on commission for the Legislative Assembly Chambers of Queensland Parliament House.
- portrait of actor, Gustavus Vaughan Brooke
- portrait of Dr. John Woolley in red robes of office

== Exhibitions ==
- 1866 - Intercolonial Exhibition of Australasia, Melbourne, 1866–67
- 1869 - Agricultural Society of New South Wales Metropolitan Intercolonial Exhibition
- 1870 - Agricultural Society of N.S.W. Exhibition
- 1872 - New South Wales Academy of Art
- 1893 - World's Columbian Exposition, Chicago, 1893. New South Wales Courts

== Publications ==
- Felton, Myra (1887), Eena Romney, or, Word-pictures of home life in New South Wales, Holmes
