= Old Goulburn Brewery =

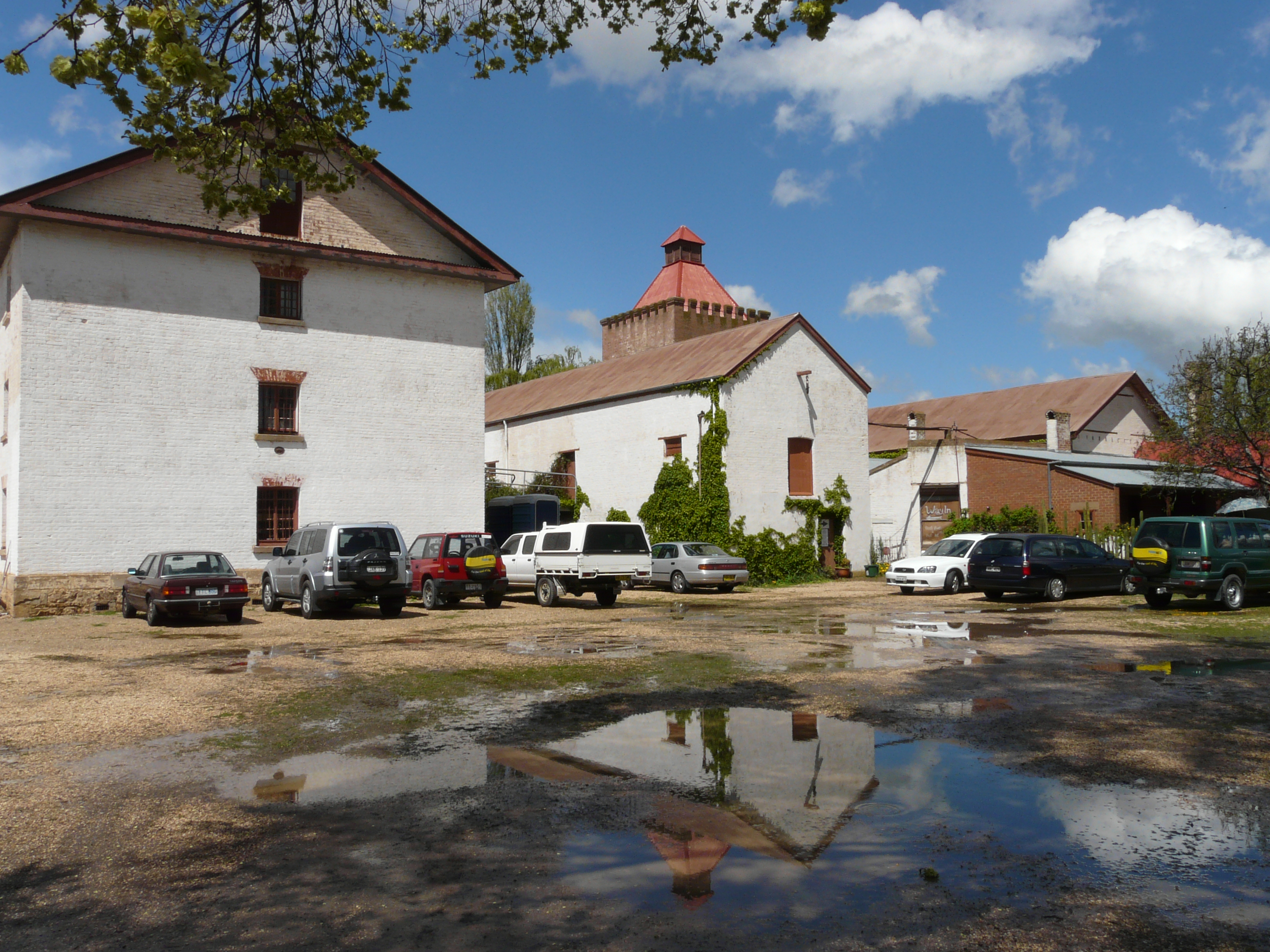

- Location within New South Wales Location within Australia
- 34.7668°S 149.7218°E
- Location: Bungonia Road, Goulburn, Goulburn Mulwaree Council, New South Wales, Australia

History
- Built: 1836–1840

New South Wales Heritage Register
- Official name: Goulburn Brewery
- Type: state heritage (complex / group)
- Designated: 2 April 1999
- Reference no.: 178
- Type: Brewery
- Category: Manufacturing and Processing

Old Goulburn Brewery is a heritage-listed brewery and now restaurant at Bungonia Road, Goulburn, Goulburn Mulwaree Council, New South Wales, Australia. It was added to the New South Wales State Heritage Register on 2 April 1999.

== History ==
The mill/brewery complex was originally part of a parcel of land promised to William Henry Broughton in 1818 as one of the first portions of the "New Country" south west of Sydney that Governor Macquarie proffered for settlement. In 1833 William Bradley took an interest in Broughton's stockyards and bought 600 acres of what was called West Park. Its close proximity to the Bradley's Landsdowne Estate on the other side of the Mulawee Chain of Ponds was the most likely reason behind his interest. The resiting of the town of Goulburn in 1832 would also have contributed.

Bradley's acquisition of this land and a total of 32 000 acres in the Goulburn district was part of a wider pattern of land holdings in which Bradley acquired over 300 000 acres, or a tenth of the available land, in the Monaro area.

In 1838 William Bradley and William Shelley became co-partners in a milling and brewing venture. This venture appears to have had its origins in 1836. Construction of the mill appears to have started in this year. A visitor in 1837 wrote that a Mr Bradbury (sic) was building a granary and steam engine flour mill. Advertisements in 1837 proclaimed the intention of the proprietors to purchase grain after the ensuing harvest. It was complete and operational in 1838 and remained as a mill until 1869. The lease to manage the operation was originally given to N. C. Phillips. When he died in 1863 Bradley leased the buildings to S. Emanuel and Son.

The exact commencement date of the brewery's operations has not been fixed although it is thought to be around the early 1840s. It remained in operation until 1854 when brewing ceased.

Thomas Capel appears to have been the first brewer at Bradley's. He moved on to another brewery but returned and was brewing at Bradley's again in 1853. During his absence John Blackshaw took over as brewer. The brewery closed in February 1854, only six months after Capel's return.

William Bradley died in April 1868 and the part of his estate which included Lansdowne and the mill/brewery complex passed from the Bradley's to new ownership in 1874.

W. J. Bartlett and J. S. Oddy moved to the complex in June 1875 and proceeded to operate it as a brewery. They appear to have been limited in capital, mortgaging the brewery for the whole of the purchase price - 3,200 pounds. In 1879 Oddy left the partnership, Bartlett purchasing Oddy's share of the business. Bartlett appears to have been the proprietor from 1879 to 1920 although several mortgage agreements are listed in his claim for Certificate of Title in 1913. One agreement involving Andrew Seton Chisholm remains unclear. It has been suggested that a sale was negotiated but not finalised.

Chisholm had the Brewery operated by James E. and Robert S. Raymond between 1887 and 1896. The Raymonds were the licensed brewers at Goulburn and there is record at the brewery of them doing so. The Raymonds appear to have been related to Chisholm by marriage and the business arrangement is confused in that it bears on Chisholm's family arrangements.

The Brewery continued to function as Bartlett and Co during this period. In 1897 Bartlett resumed the role of brewer.

In 1913 Bartlett divided the land into two lots, one containing the mill/brewery and the other his residence, Broughton. An offer was made to Tooth and Co. in 1914 but was declined. In 1920 Tooth and Co agreed to buy the brewery for 14 000 pounds. In this purchase they also acquired ten year extensions of the leases of five hotels as well as Bartlett's interest in the trade of another six. Arrangements were made for the Maudslay steam condensing beam engine to revert to Bartlett in the event of Tooth and Co deciding to discontinue brewing at Goulburn.

Tooth and Company took over the brewery in October–November 1920. Bartlett continued to supervise work for twelve months before retiring at the end of 1921. The title of the property was formally transferred on 7 November 1921.

Frank Carman, who had been working for Bartlett since 1910, took over as Manager after Bartlett's retirement. Under his management the premises were used as a depot for Tooth and Co products. The brewery continued to function until August 1929 when the company decided to cease brewing and use the premises as a depot only. The final brew was made on 7 August and all bottling was completed by 23 September. The decision to stop brewing was prompted by several factors, including the need to replace the loco boiler in a period of economic depression in Australia.

In 1954 Tooth and Co appointed Jim Malcolm as manager of the Goulburn depot and the licence for the premises was transferred to his name. His role was that of caretaker in the absence of Frank Carman who was in ill health. It was the intention of the company to close the depot if Carman remained indisposed. Carman died in 1955 and after a "decent interval" the company announced on 5 August 1956 that it would close the depot at the end of the month.

In March 1958 Tooth & Co accepted an offer of 3,500 pounds from Hedley and Joyce Carman, the son and daughter-in-law of Frank Carman, for the purchase of the buildings and site. The Carmans renovated a portion of the building known as the sugar rooms, converting it into a modern flat. They continued to use the property as a residence until 1975. The Carmans also attempted to use it for the storage of hay but floods made it seem unsuitable.

In 1974-75 Goulburn City Council expressed interest in buying the complex and developing it as a tourist site. This did not happen and the Carmans sold the property to the Phoenix Community Services Ltd in 1975. The intention was to use the property as a rehabilitation centre. It operated in this capacity until the mid 1980s.

In 1989 the complex was reopened, incorporating the restored brewery, a hotel, restaurant, function rooms, cabaret theatre restaurant, art gallery and accommodation.

== Description ==
The buildings of the complex are mainly constructed of load bearing brickwork. All are substantial, and the resultant grouping, which virtually reached its present form in the first half of the 19th century, possesses great visual charm.

=== Modifications and dates ===
- 1870 – Old boiler room maltings, kiln and office 3 added; Bottle wash area added
- 1871 – Brewers cottages 1 & 2 added
- 1877 – New boiler room and barrel store added; Mews 4a-b, old boiler room, maltings and malt kin altered
- 1878 – Cooperage added
- c. 1879–1902 – Cooperage, cellar, brew hall and gyle room added and tower heightened. Bottling room, cool room and brew tower altered
- 1920 – Electric motor room added and new boiler room altered
- c. 1984–1989 – Restoration of the brewery complex
- 2021 - Sold in November 2021
- Reopened in August 2025 under new ownership

== Heritage listing ==
The Goulburn Mill/Brewery is one of the most substantial industrial establishments to survive in country New South Wales from early colonial times. It is a well designed, integrated industrial complex that has been put to different uses in response to shifts in the economy. Its changes in function illustrate the fluctuating fortunes of the flour milling and brewing industries in country NSW in general and the Southern Tablelands and Goulburn in particular.

It is associated with William Bradley, a pastoralist who gathered considerable holdings in the Argyle and Monaro districts and influenced the development of those districts. It is also associated with W.J.Bartlett, a brewer and civic benefactor.

Alterations to the complex provide a record of ways in which milling and brewing technology has changed.

The site is an important element in the heritage of Goulburn. The size and nature of the buildings have made it a local landmark. It indicates the importance of Goulburn as the major provincial centre in southern NSW in the 19th century.

The site contains a range of moveable heritage items, embracing a wide range of artefacts relating to the machinery and the historic activities of the place.

Goulburn Brewery was listed on the New South Wales State Heritage Register on 2 April 1999 having satisfied the following criteria.

The place is important in demonstrating the course, or pattern, of cultural or natural history in New South Wales.

The Goulburn Brewery is significant primarily because it is the remaining physical evidence of 120 years of varied industrial activity occupying one group of buildings conceived within the first 50 years of white settlement in NSW. The group bears comparison with important historic industrial structures elsewhere in Australia, including the former Australian Sugar Company at Canterbury, the Venus State Battery at Charters Towers and the Cascade Brewery in Hobart. However, no known industrial complex combines longevity, complexity, variety and intactness more manifestly than the Goulburn Brewery Group.

The Goulburn Brewery Complex has long associations with the pioneer white land holders in the area. The subsequent history of the Brewery's development closely parallels the movement of financial power within the state. The ownership of the site, firstly by large scale pastoralist land owners, then by merchant entrepreneurs, afterwards by monopolistic public companies, and more recently government and community involvement, has been well documented. The physical evidence of continuing as well as past social history is important.

The place is important in demonstrating aesthetic characteristics and/or a high degree of creative or technical achievement in New South Wales.

From the time of the earliest settlement of Goulburn, the Brewery complex has, by virtue of its location adjacent to the Mulwaree Ponds, its Georgian form, and the subsequent sympathetic additions, have been regarded as an aesthetic focal point and feathered in sketches, maps and photographs. The susceptibility of much of the surrounding land to flooding, and the concentration of Goulburn's growth west of the brewery complex, have resulted in the retention of most of the Brewery's visual curtilage; historic prospects as well as aspects are surprisingly intact.

The main elements of the complex show clearly the influence of British Georgian building tradition on the planning and detailing of industrial buildings in Australia during the first half of the 19th century. The complex demonstrates the Georgian use of geometry and proportion in the harmonious design of a group of buildings related in function and diversity of size. Though no architect is known to have been associated with the Goulburn Complex, comparison may be made with some other geometrical examples such as Francis Greenway's Hyde Park Barracks of 1817, and with Greenway's treatment of Robert Campbell Junior's residence and outbuildings in Bligh Street in 1822.

The place has strong or special association with a particular community or cultural group in New South Wales for social, cultural or spiritual reasons.

Public esteem for the place and local respect for its historical value is high and, by all accounts, increasing. The tourist potential of the place is great and there is evidence that the Brewery is considered locally to be an important part of Goulburn's future.

The place has potential to yield information that will contribute to an understanding of the cultural or natural history of New South Wales.

The materials used in work carried on over the life of the brewery provide evidence of great technological improvements. Beginning with hand processed materials won from the immediate area – bricks, mud mortars, hand wrought iron & split shingles – the materials progress to machine finished locally made items and then imported finished components. Despite these dramatic improvements in building materials the standards of workmanship remained consistently simple, testifying to the utilitarian nature of the project.

The alterations to the brewery provide a vivid record of the ways in which brewing and milling technology changed during a period of 120 years.

The site is one upon which technological change and varied industrial activity have left many signs of usage over a long time span. The layering effect of sequential activities has meant that building fabric and surfaces bear much unexplained evidence of previous uses. Much of this evidence is capable of only archaeological interpretation, and this fact reinforces the significance of the existing fabric and surfaces, which convey virtually as much information as the structural forms and spaces. The site therefore offers the opportunity for extensive and meaningful future archaeological investigation. There is an extensive collection of moveable heritage items that provide research potential for changes in brewing and milling technology over a period of 120 years.
