= Electoral district of County of Argyle =

Former New South Wales Legislative Council electoral district

County of Argyle New South Wales—Legislative Council
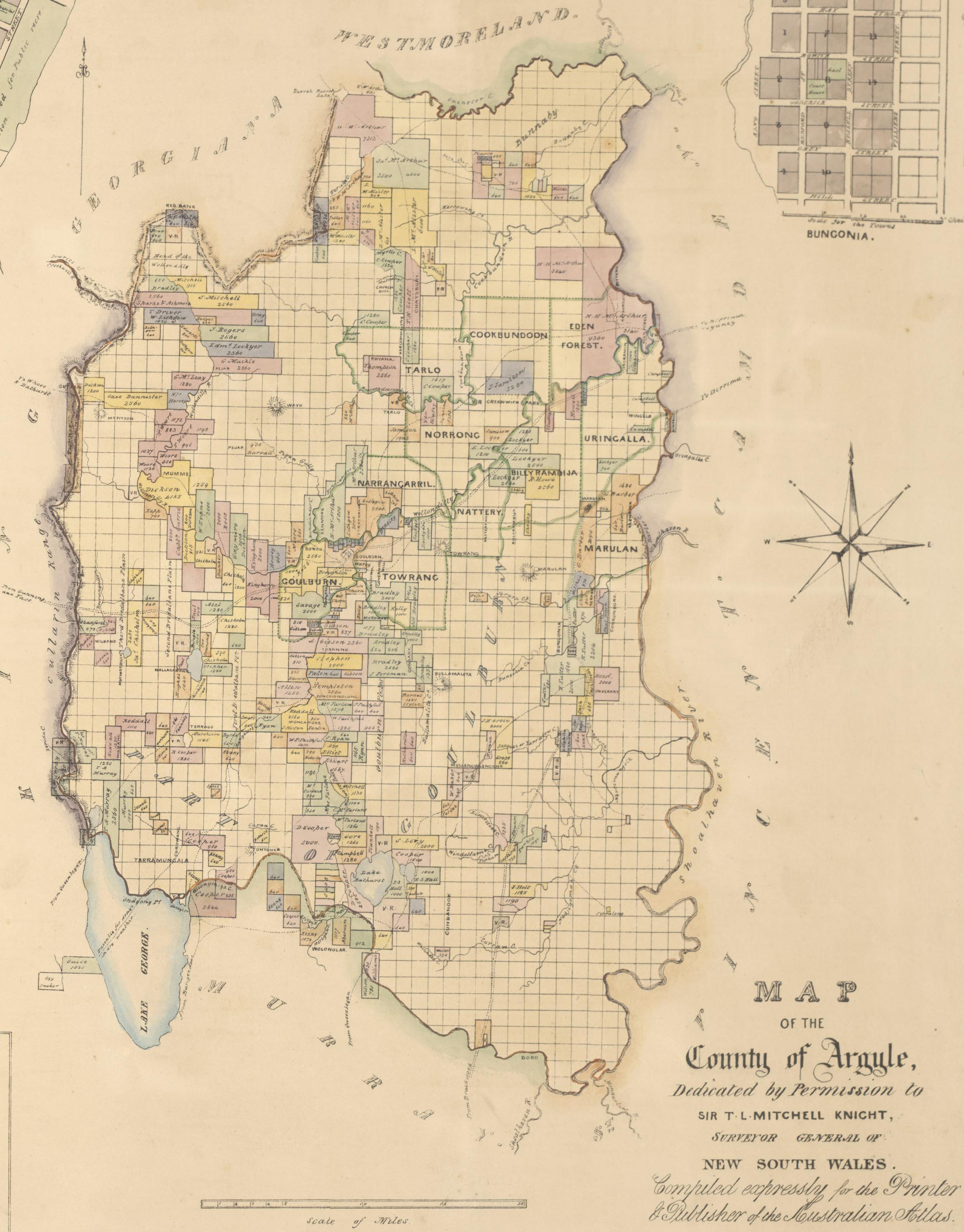
- 1840s map of the County of Argyle
- State: New South Wales
- Created: 1843
- Abolished: 1856
- Namesake: Argyle County
- Coordinates: 34°30′S 150°0′E

The Electoral district of County of Argyle was an electorate of the New South Wales Legislative Council at a time when some of its members were elected and the balance were appointed by the Governor.

It was created by the 1843 Electoral Districts Act and returned one member. On all four elections, there was only one candidate who was elected unopposed. In 1856 the unicameral Legislative Council was abolished and replaced with an elected Legislative Assembly and an appointed Legislative Council. The district was represented by the Legislative Assembly electorate of Argyle.

== Members ==
Member	Term
William Bradley	Jun 1843 – Jul 1846
William Faithfull	Jul 1846 – Jun 1848
Charles Nicholson	Jul 1848 – Feb 1856

== Election results ==
=== 1843 ===
1843 New South Wales colonial election, 19 June: County of Argyle
Candidate	Votes	%
William Bradley	unopposed	

=== 1846 ===
Bradley resigned in July 1846.

1846 County of Argyle by-election 24 July
Candidate	Votes	%
William Faithfull	unopposed	

=== 1848 ===
1848 New South Wales colonial election, 31 July: County of Argyle
Candidate	Votes	%
Charles Nicholson (elected)	unopposed	

=== 1851 ===
1851 New South Wales colonial election, 18 September: County of Argyle
Candidate	Votes	%
Charles Nicholson	unopposed	

== See also ==
- Members of the New South Wales Legislative Council, 1843–1851 and 1851-1856
