= Battle of Broken River =

Massacre in Victoria, Australia

Coordinates: 36.548962°S 145.975074°E

Date	11 April 1838
Location	Broken River, near Benalla, Victoria
Result	Aboriginal victory

Belligerents
European settlers	Aboriginal Australians

Commanders and leaders
George and William Faithfull	

Strength
18	20

Casualties and losses
7 to 11 dead (est.)	1 dead (est.)

The Battle of Broken River, also known as the Faithfull Massacre, sometimes spelt Faithful Massacre, took place in 1838 when 20 Aboriginal Australians attacked 18 European settlers, killing eight of them.

Reprisals against the Aboriginal people continued for many years afterwards, killing up to 100 people.

== Description ==
A party of some 18 men, convict servants of George and William Faithfull, had been scouring south of Wangaratta for more grazing land for their livestock, and, while doing so, disrupted an important ceremonial gathering of indigenous peoples taking place at Benalla.On 11 April 1838, by the Broken River, they shot some participants in these rites and were in turn speared. At least one Koori and eight Europeans died. This became known in the settler press and locally as the 'Faithfull Massacre.'

There are conflicting accounts of the reason for the attack: one account suggests that it was retribution for Faithfull’s men shooting at the Aboriginal men on the Ovens River a week prior while another suggests that it was “revenge for the illicit use of Aboriginal women by the same party several weeks before”. While the incident has been referred to as a "massacre", the historian Chris Clark argues that "there is no reason to view this incident as anything other than a battle which the Aborigines won".

The settlers may have been camping on a ground reserved for hunting or ceremonies.

The site of the incident was re-discovered in 1907.

=== A settler's son's account of the incident ===
A 1906 newspaper account ("particulars of which [were] obtained from a son of one of the number of the party") is as follows:

A party of nine men reached the Broken River in the summer of 1837.

After crossing it they camped on its banks, where Magennis' mill now stands. Here they remained for a fortnight, with a large flock of sheep, while Faithful (sic) and a black boy rode forward to explore. He decided to take up a run near Euroa, subsequently known as Faithful's Creek and sent the boy back to the men with orders for them to bring on the sheep. These were then divided into two flocks, with two shepherds in attendance on each flock.

The first flock started about one hour before the second and had barely covered the first mile when the two shepherds were speared by the Merangans. The men in charge of the second flock, before they had proceeded half-a-mile, shared the same fate. The blood-thirsty natives proceeding towards the spot where the camp had been formed met the bullock dray, with five men in attendance. They again threw their spears with such deadly aim that three more men were killed. The two survivors, Brown and Glenn, beat a retreat, but the latter snatched up a loaded gun before he ran. They went parallel with the river, but at some distance from it, as the reeds stood thick along its banks and formed an excellent cover for the aborigines. They ran in a westerly direction towards Upoti potpon. Their enemies had made up their minds that none should escape, and so followed in hot pursuit. One of the fleetest was rapidly gaining on the whites, and had almost come within spearing distance when Glenn turned and shot him. The other blacks continued the chase. Another being faster than Brown, and getting close to him, threw his spear, but missed the intended victim, who immediately seized it. The two fugitives outlasted the aborigines. They left their boots as soon as possible to make the task of tracking them more difficult. They continued running until they were almost blind from exhaustion.

— Mr S. Uren, History of Benalla, Benalla Standard (Tue 9 Oct 1906)

== Reprisal killings ==
Around one hundred Aboriginal people were murdered in reprisal killings, which stretched on for many years.

Reprisal killings, some of them conducted by William Faithfull and Peter Snodgrass, occurred at Wangaratta on the Ovens River, at Murchison (led by the native police under Henry Dana, with the young Edward Curr, who later said that he took issue with the official reports), Mitchelton and Toolamba. The colonial government decided to "open up" the lands south of Yass, New South Wales after the Faithfull incident and bring them under British rule, with one of the aims ostensibly to help protect the Aboriginal people from reprisal attacks.

== See also ==
- List of massacres of Indigenous Australians
