= William Davies (New South Wales politician) =

Politician, storekeeper, gold miner and mayor in New South Wales, Australia

William Davies (1 February 1824 – 14 August 1890) was an English-born politician, storekeeper, gold miner and mayor in New South Wales, Australia.

He was born in Manchester to Thomas and Anna Maria Davies. He migrated to New South Wales around 1849, becoming a bookkeeper at Goulburn before moving to Melbourne to work for the Argus. In 1852 he mined for gold at Araluen before returning to Goulburn in the later 1850s. On 11 May 1852 he married Maria Cooper at Surry Hills; they had four children. He managed a variety of stores throughout the region and was an alderman at Goulburn from 1859 to 1887, serving four times as mayor. In 1877 he was elected to the New South Wales Legislative Assembly for Argyle, but he did not re-contest in 1880. He went further into business in the 1880s, becoming involved in mining and railway companies before becoming insolvent in 1887.

Davies was a prominent Wesleyan Methodist and was for many years active in the Goulburn Wesleyan circuit. His eldest son was the first pupil enrolled at Newington College on its inauguration at Newington House at Silverwater, New South Wales. At the time Arthur was under 9 years old. Davies helped to lay the foundation stone of Newington at its new campus at Stanmore, New South Wales and became a life member of its council.

Davies died at Redfern in 1890.

New South Wales Legislative Assembly
Preceded by Edward Butler	Member for Argyle; 1877–1880	Succeeded by William Holborow; Phillip G. Myers
Civic offices
Preceded by P Dignam	Mayor of Goulburn; 1863	Succeeded by Thomas Gale
Unknown	Mayor of Goulburn; 1868	Succeeded by Frederick Horn
Preceded by Arthur M Hunt	Mayor of Goulburn; 1876 – 1878	Succeeded by Edward Ball
