= Thomas Rose (politician) =

Australian politician

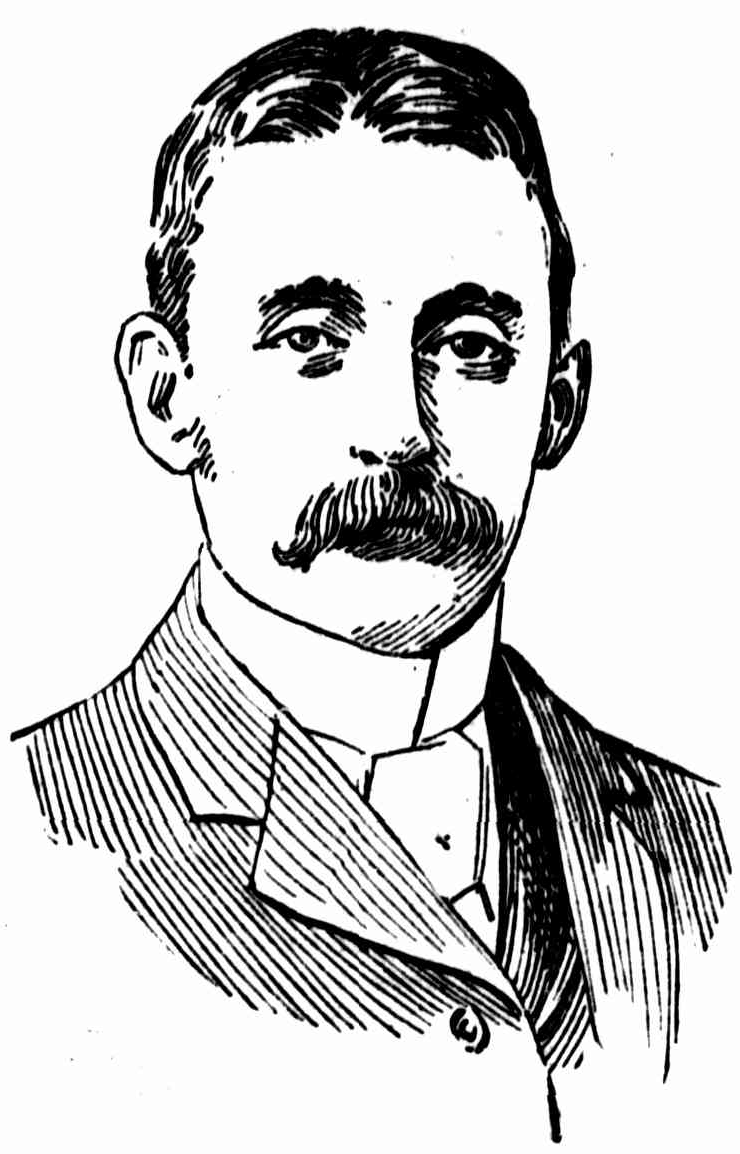
Thomas Rose in 1901

Thomas Rose (1856 – 10 June 1926) was an Australian politician.

He was born in Parramatta to pastoralist Charles Henry Jacob Rose and Rosanna Robinetta Nicholls. He attended public schools in Parramatta and Campbelltown before working as a draper in Parramatta and Bathurst. He also ran general stores in Molong and Murrumburrah. A lawyer, he was called to the bar in 1898, although he was disbarred at his own request in 1904 and worked as a solicitor, becoming a partner in the firm Rose and Dawes. His first marriage was to Valerie Kable, but in 1894 he remarried Elizabeth Ann Barber. He was elected to the New South Wales Legislative Assembly in 1891 as the Protectionist member for Argyle, serving until his defeat in 1904. Rose died in Burwood in 1926.

New South Wales Legislative Assembly
Preceded by Edward Ball	Member for Argyle; 1891–1904; Served alongside: William Holborow/none	Abolished
