= Phillip Dignam =

Irish-born Australian politician

Phillip Dignam (1810 – 23 June 1879) was an Irish-born Australian politician.

He was born in Dublin and migrated to Australia around 1839. On 13 September 1843 he married Bridget O'Hanlon, with whom he had eight children. He worked as an auctioneer in 1846, based in Goulburn, and in 1849 opened the town's first pawnshop. A Goulburn alderman and mayor, he ran general stores and then entered the wine and spirits business. In 1864 he was elected to the New South Wales Legislative Assembly for Argyle, but he did not re-contest in 1869. Dignam died at Goulburn in 1879.

New South Wales Legislative Assembly
Preceded by Samuel Emmanuel	Member for Argyle; 1864–1869	Succeeded by Edward Butler
