= Edward Ball (Australian politician) =

Politician, tobacconist and hairdresser in New South Wales, Australia

Edward Joseph Ball (23 September 1827 – 4 November 1894) was an English-born politician tobacconist and hairdresser in New South Wales, Australia.

He was born at Lewisham in Kent, the son of hairdresser Edward Ball. He arrived in Melbourne around 1859 and soon moved to Sydney and then to Goulburn, where he worked as a tobacconist and hairdresser. On 23 April 1860 he married Jane Meldrum, with whom he had ten children. In 1876 he purchased St Clair, one of Goulburn's earliest houses, living there until around 1883. He was a Goulburn alderman for 15 years, twice serving as mayor in 1878 and 1880. His wife Jane died on 24 May 1885 and he retired from his business in December 1885. In 1885 he was an unsuccessful candidate for the New South Wales Legislative Assembly district of Argyle, which was the county surrounding Goulburn, but not the town itself which was in its own electorate. He stood again in 1887 and was elected as a Free Trade member. Re-elected in 1889, he was defeated in 1891. He was a candidate for Goulburn in 1894, but polled just 6% of the vote.

Ball died at Goulburn on 4 November 1894 (aged 67).

New South Wales Legislative Assembly
Preceded by Francis Tait	Member for Argyle; 1887 – 1891; With: William Holborow	Succeeded by Thomas Rose
Civic offices
Preceded by William Davies	Mayor of Goulburn; 1878	Succeeded by William Davies
Preceded by William Davies	Mayor of Goulburn; 1880	Succeeded by James Clifford
