= William Holborow =

Australian politician

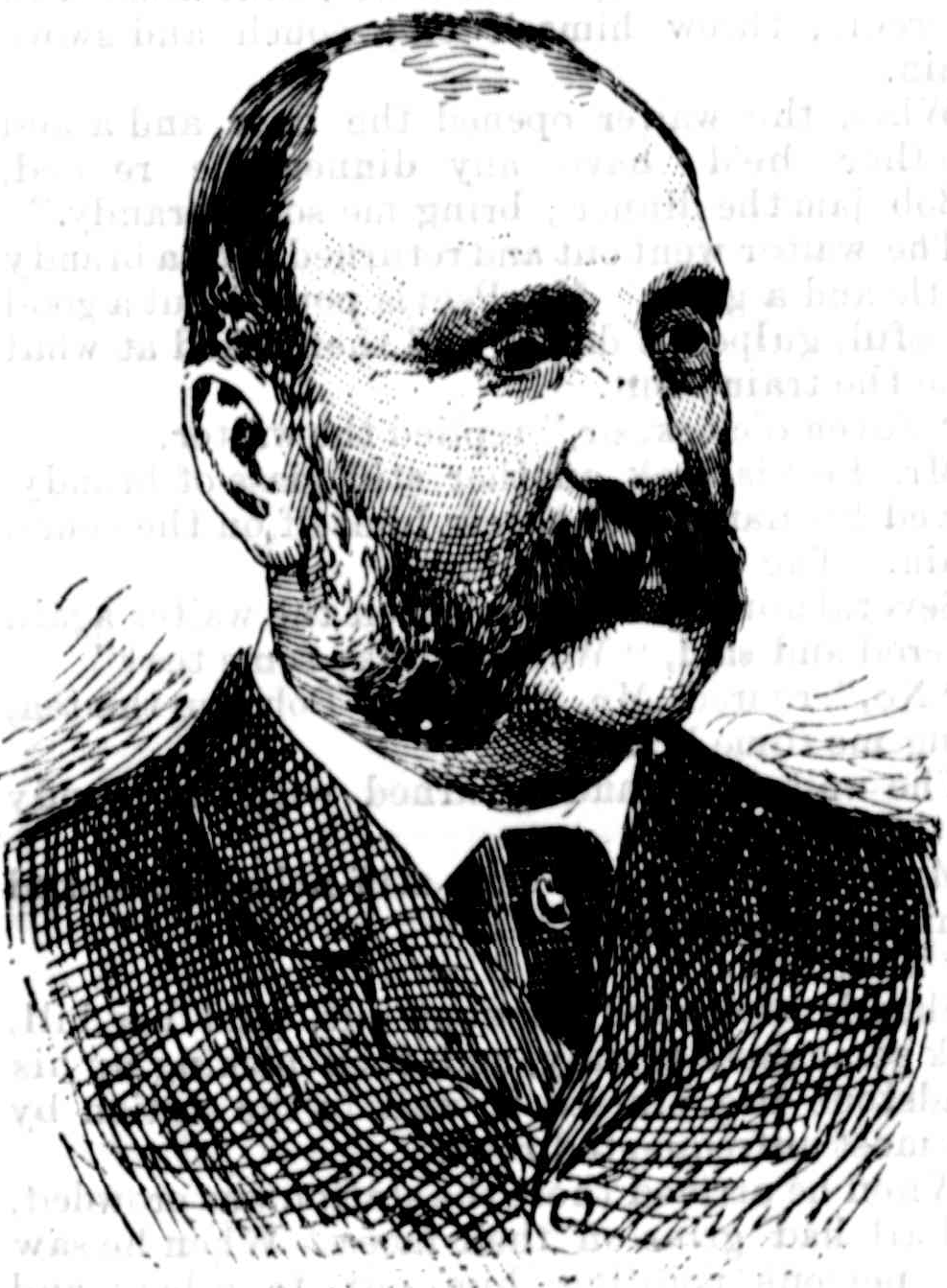

William Hillier Holborow CMG VD (23 December 1841 – 10 July 1917) was an Australian politician.

== Early life ==
He was born in Sydney to linen draper Daniel Holborow and his wife Mary. He was educated privately and became a storekeeper at Richmond. On 27 July 1864 he married Amelia Town; they had ten children. He formed the Richmond Volunteer Rifles as a lieutenant in 1870, becoming a captain in 1871, a lieutenant colonel in 1881 and a colonel in 1896.

== Political career ==
An inaugural Richmond alderman from 1872, he was mayor from 1874, to 1875. He was again elected mayor in 1878, 1879, and 1880.

In 1880 he was elected to the New South Wales Legislative Assembly as the member for Argyle. A Free Trader, he held his seat until his retirement in 1894. He was one of the commissioners for New South Wales for the Melbourne Centennial Exhibition in 1888. In 1899 he was appointed to the Legislative Council, where he remained until his death. He did not hold ministerial or parliamentary office.

== Death ==
Holborow died at Croydon on 10 July 1917 (aged 75).

== Honours ==
He was appointed a Companion of the Order of St Michael and St George (CMG) in 1896, and awarded a Volunteer Officers' Decoration in 1895.

New South Wales Legislative Assembly
Preceded by William Davies	Member for Argyle; 1880 – 1894; Served alongside: Myers/Gannon/Parkes/Tait/Ball	Succeeded by Thomas Rose
Civic offices
Preceded by Joseph Onus	Mayor of Richmond; 1874 – 1875	Succeeded by Joseph Onus
Preceded by William Garling	Mayor of Richmond; 1878 – 1881	Succeeded by Joseph Edward Onus
