= Edward Butler (Australian politician) =

Australian politician

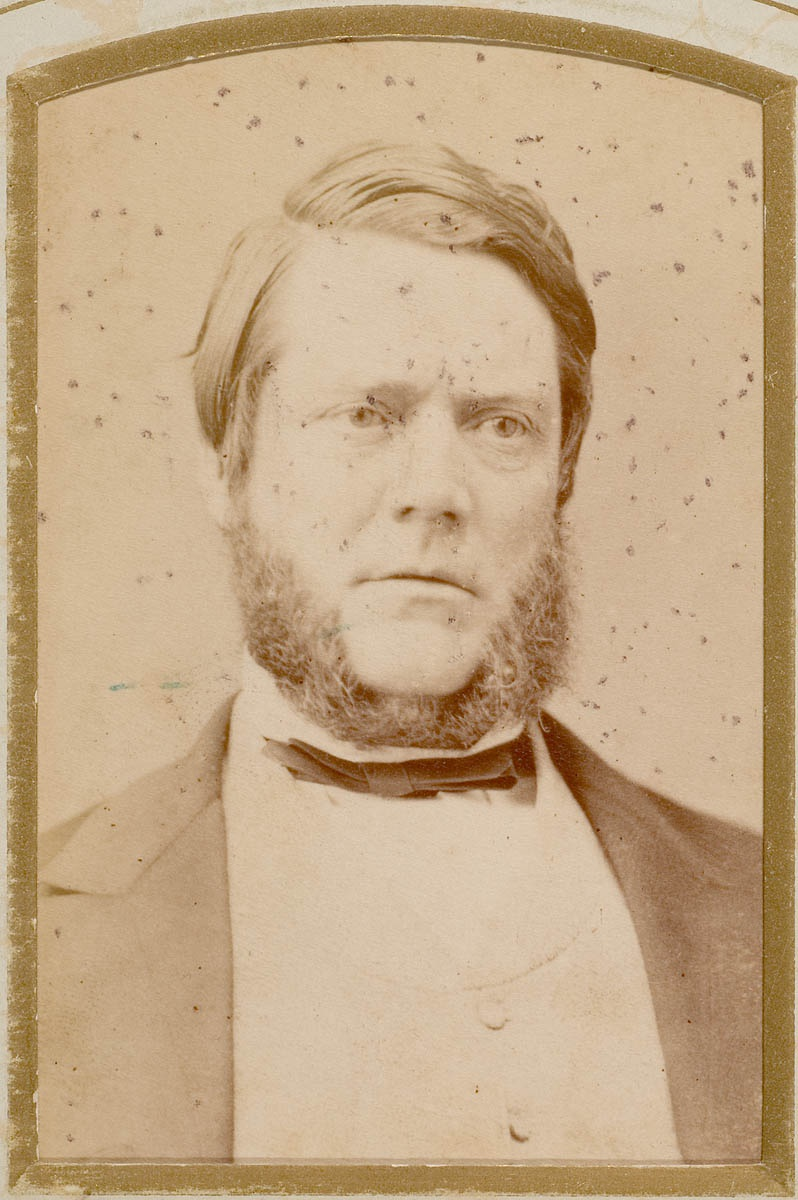
Edward Butler, Barrister

Edward Butler, QC (1823 – 9 June 1879), was a barrister and politician in colonial New South Wales, 13th Attorney General of New South Wales.

Butler was born in Kilkenny, Ireland, son of Michael Butler, farmer, and his wife Mary, née Joyce. He was educated at St Kieran's College intending to become a priest, according to Thomas Carlyle. During the Great Famine he became a journalist and supported Young Ireland as the editor of the Galway Vindicator. Young Ireland attempted to build an Irish national movement that included Catholics and Protestants and campaigned for a common educational system for all denominations.

Butler found that his ambitions to be trained as a lawyer were blocked in Ireland because of his Catholicism and he migrated to Sydney, arriving in May 1853, where he found work writing for Henry Parkes' Empire. He was admitted as a barrister in 1855 and was appointed as a crown prosecutor for the metropolitan and coast district in 1857. In 1858 he married Ellen Mary Connolly and they had four sons and five daughters.

In politics Butler was a strong supporter of the "liberal party", associated with Parkes and John Robertson, including Robertson's land policy and Charles Cowper's support for the withdrawal of state aid to religion. From 1869 to 1877 he was the member for Argyle in the New South Wales Legislative Assembly, and was the 13th Attorney General of New South Wales in the first Parkes ministry from May 1872 to November 1873. He made a major contribution to reducing the level of sectarianism that had been sparked by Henry James O'Farrell's attack on Prince Alfred, Duke of Edinburgh in 1868. He became a Queen's Counsel on 19 November 1873.

Butler's first wife died in 1871 and, in 1875, he married Marion and they had one daughter. He was appointed for life to the Legislative Council in 1877. He had become a wealthy squatter.

He died in Sydney on 9 June 1879 (aged 55–56).

Parliament of New South Wales
Political offices
Preceded by Sir James Martin QC	Attorney General of New South Wales; 1872 – 1873	Succeeded by Joseph Innes
New South Wales Legislative Assembly
Preceded by Phillip Dignam	Member for Argyle; 1869 – 1877	Succeeded by William Davies
