= Francis Tait =

Australian politician

Francis Tait (1838 – 21 April 1888) was an English-born Australian politician.

He was born in Durham to builder Edward Tait and Jane Briggs. He studied in Surrey to become a Wesleyan missionary, and spent ten years in Fiji. In 1860 he married Eleanor Saint, with whom he had six children. Around 1871 he moved to New South Wales, and the following year was appointed a minister at Armidale. In 1872 Prince Joseph Celua of Fiji came to Australia and was in Tait's care until he was enrolled at Newington College. His subsequent posts were at Chippendale (1875) and Goulburn (1878), but he resigned from the ministry in 1883. From 1884 he was a Goulburn alderman, serving as mayor in 1887. A building society manager, he was elected to the New South Wales Legislative Assembly for Argyle in 1885, but did not re-contest in 1887. Tait died at Goulburn in 1888.

New South Wales Legislative Assembly
Preceded by Sir Henry Parkes	Member for Argyle; 1885–1887; Served alongside: William Holborow	Succeeded by Edward Ball
