= William Bradley (New South Wales politician, born 1800) =

Australian colonial politician (1800–1868)

William Bradley (1 June 1800 – 6 April 1868) was an Australian politician.

== Early life ==
William was born at Windsor in New South Wales to Sergeant Jonas Bradley and Catherine. On 10 August 1831, he married Emily Elizabeth Hovell (1811–1848), with whom he had eight children. Emily was the daughter of explorer William Hilton Hovell.

William farmed near Bredbo and Goulburn, and at the latter ran a flour mill and brewery, which survives as the Old Goulburn Brewery.

He became a significant landholder in the Monaro region of New South Wales, when he took over the leasehold of 'Dangelong', from the bankrupt John Mackenzie, in 1848, and later, acquired 'Coolrington'.

== Political life ==
He was a member of the New South Wales Legislative Council, first as an elected member from 1843 to 1846 and then as an appointee from 1851 to 1856.

== Death ==
Bradley died in Darling Point in 1868.

New South Wales Legislative Council
New creation	Member for County of Argyle; Jul 1843 – Feb 1846	Succeeded by William Faithfull
