= Phillip G. Myers =

Politician and auctioneer in New South Wales, Australia

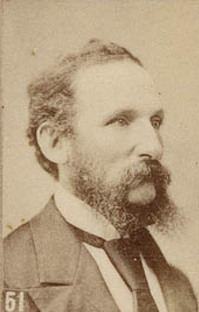

Phillip George Myers (20 May 1839 – 16 November 1881) was a politician and auctioneer in New South Wales, Australia.

He was born in Sydney to Israel Myers and Esther née Solomon. He worked as an auctioneer and stock agent before entering politics. In 1878 he established a wool mill at Goulburn. In 1880 he was elected to the New South Wales Legislative Assembly for Argyle. On 29 October 1881 he married Alice Mary Blundell, but less than a month later he died at Brisbane, aged 42.

New South Wales Legislative Assembly
Preceded by William Davies	Member for Argyle; 1880–1881; Served alongside: William Holborow	Succeeded by John Gannon
