= Samuel Emmanuel =

Australian politician

Samuel Emanuel (1803 – 11 July 1868) was an English-born Australian politician.

He was born at Portsmouth to Moses Emanuel and his wife Rosetta. He migrated to Australia in 1832, becoming a businessman before opening a store at Goulburn in 1845. In 1862 he was elected to the New South Wales Legislative Assembly for Argyle, serving until his defeat in 1864. Emanuel died in Sydney in 1868.

New South Wales Legislative Assembly
Preceded by Terence Murray	Member for Argyle; 1862–1864	Succeeded by Phillip Dignam
