= John Gannon (Australian politician) =

Australian politician

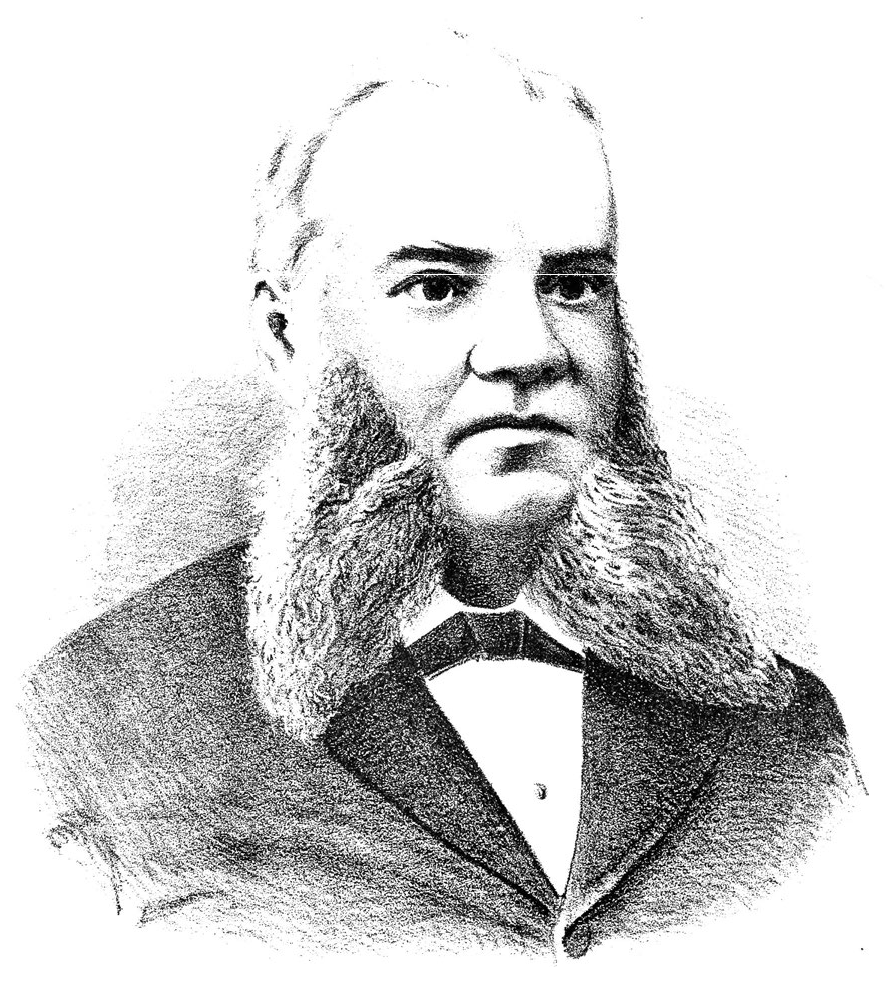

John Thomas Gannon (1830 – 5 August 1887) was a politician and solicitor in New South Wales, Australia.

He was born in Sydney in around 1830, (Note: The Australian Men of Mark gives his year of birth as 1832.) the second child of convict James Gannon and his wife Mary née Phelps. A younger brother Michael would later be a member of the Queensland Legislative Assembly. He attended state schools before becoming an articled clerk to Bob Nichols. On 12 July 1855 he married Harriette Mary Jones, with whom he had four children. He was admitted as a solicitor in 1857. before moving to Goulburn from 1859.

He served as Mayor of Goulburn from 1872 to 1873. He was elected to the New South Wales Legislative Assembly for Argyle at the by-election in 1881, serving until he resigned in March 1885.

== Death ==
Gannon died at Parramatta in 1887, aged around 56.

His eldest son, Henry Shuttleworth Gannon followed his father, practicing as a solicitor, and was Mayor of Goulburn in 1888 and 1889, but was unsuccessful in standing for parliament at the 1890 by-election for Goulburn, and the 1894 election for Argyle. In 1897 he ostensibly went on holiday to Fiji, but in fact fled to the United States after misappropriating nearly £15,000 of client's money.

== Notes ==
New South Wales Legislative Assembly
| Preceded by Phillip G. Myers | Member for Argyle; 1881 – 1885; Served alongside: William Holborow | Succeeded by Sir Henry Parkes |
Civic offices
| Preceded by Frederick Horn | Mayor of Goulburn; 1872 – 1873 | Succeeded by Frederick Horn |
