= Charles Nicholson =

Charles Nicholson may refer to:

- Sir Charles Nicholson, 1st Baronet, of Luddenham (1808–1903), British-Australian politician, first speaker of the New South Wales Legislative Council
- Sir Charles Nicholson, 2nd Baronet (1867–1949), his son, British ecclesiastical architect
- Charles Nicholson (flautist) (1795–1837), English flautist and composer
- Charles Edward Nicholson (1854–1931), Australian politician
- Sir Charles Nicholson, 1st Baronet, of Harrington Gardens (1857–1918), British Liberal politician, MP for Doncaster, 1906–1918
- Charles Ernest Nicholson (1868–1954), British yacht designer at Camper and Nicholsons
- Charles G. Nicholson (1919–2003), Republican member of the Pennsylvania House of Representatives
- Charles Christian Nicholson (born 1941), British baronet
