= Electoral district of Argyle =

Former state electoral district of New South Wales, Australia

Argyle New South Wales—Legislative Assembly
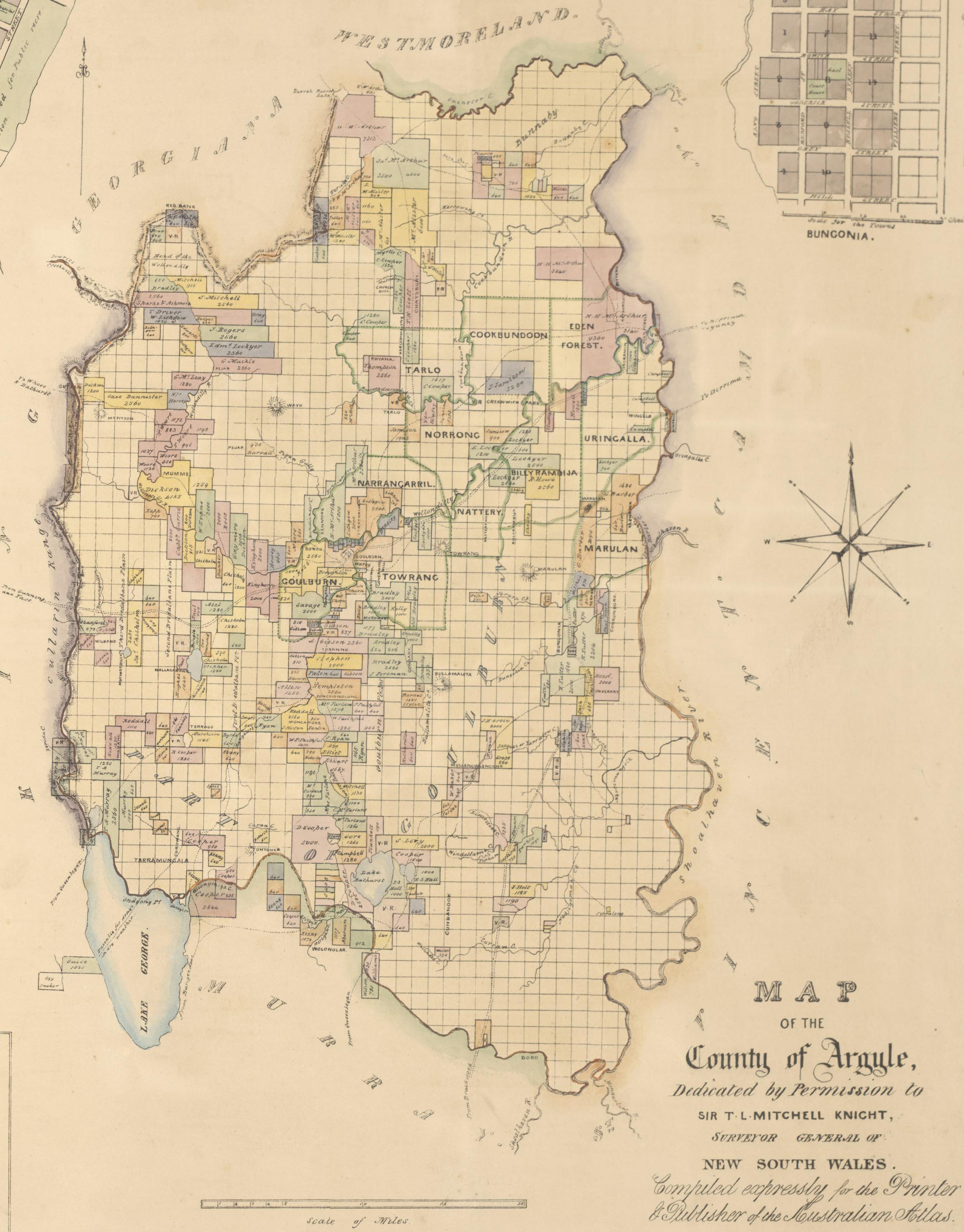
- 1840s map of the County of Argyle
- State: New South Wales
- Created: 1856
- Abolished: 1904
- Namesake: Argyle County
- Coordinates: 34°30′S 150°0′E

Argyle was an electoral district for the Legislative Assembly in the Australian state of New South Wales from 1856 to 1904, including Argyle County surrounding Goulburn. The town of Goulburn was in Southern Boroughs from 1856 to 1859 and then Goulburn. The district had previously been represented by the district of County of Argyle in the partially elected Legislative Council.

It elected two members simultaneously between 1880 and 1894, with voters casting two votes and the first two candidates being elected.

== Members for Argyle ==
Single-member (1856–1880)
Member	Party	Term			
John Plunkett	None	1856–1857			
Daniel Deniehy	None	1857–1859			
Terence Aubrey Murray	None	1859–1862			
Samuel Emmanuel	None	1862–1864			
Phillip Dignam	None	1864–1869			
Edward Butler	None	1869–1877			
William Davies	None	1877–1880			
Two members (1880–1894)
Member	Party	Term	Member	Party	Term
William Holborow	None	1880–1887	Phillip G. Myers	None	1880–1881
William Holborow	None	1880–1887	John Gannon	None	1881–1885
William Holborow	None	1880–1887	Henry Parkes	None	1885–1885
William Holborow	None	1880–1887	Francis Tait	None	1885–1887
William Holborow	Free Trade	1887–1894	Edward Ball	Free Trade	1887–1891
William Holborow	Free Trade	1887–1894	Thomas Rose	Protectionist	1891–1894
Single-member (1894–1904)
Member	Party	Term			
Thomas Rose	Protectionist	1894–1901			
Thomas Rose	Progressive	1901–1904			

== Election results ==
1901 New South Wales state election: Argyle
Party	Candidate	Votes	%	±%
Progressive	Thomas Rose	1,059	67.3	+12.2
Liberal Reform	Francis Isaac	514	32.7	−12.2
Total formal votes		1,573	99.4	−0.1
Informal votes		9	0.6	+0.1
Turnout		1,582	59.7	−4.6
Progressive hold				
