= Electoral results for the district of Northumberland =

Election results for Northumberland, New South Wales, Australia

Northumberland, an electoral district of the Legislative Assembly in the Australian state of New South Wales was created in 1859 and abolished in 1913.

Election	Member	Party				
1859	Alexander Scott	None				
1860	Thomas Lewis	None				
1862 by	Atkinson Tighe	None				
1864	Atkinson Tighe	None				
1868 by	Atkinson Tighe	None				
1869	William Brookes	None				
1872	James Hannell	None				
1874	Charles Stevens	None				
1877 by	William Turner	None				
1877	Thomas Hungerford	None				
1880 by	Ninian Melville	None	Member	Party		
1880	Ninian Melville	None	William Turner	None		
1882 by	Ninian Melville	None	Thomas Hungerford	None		
1882	Ninian Melville	None	Atkinson Tighe	None		
1884	Ninian Melville	None	Richard Luscombe	None		
1885	Ninian Melville	None	Joseph Creer	None	Member	Party
1887	Ninian Melville	Protectionist	Joseph Creer	Ind. Protectionist	Thomas Walker	Protectionist
1889	Ninian Melville	Protectionist	Joseph Creer	Protectionist	Thomas Walker	Protectionist
1891	Ninian Melville	Protectionist	Alfred Edden	Labour	Thomas Walker	Protectionist
1894	Richard Stevenson	Protectionist				
1895	Henry Wheeler	Free Trade				
1898	Richard Stevenson	Protectionist				
1899 by	John Norton	Independent				
1901	John Norton	Independent				
1904	Matthew Charlton	Labour				
1907	Matthew Charlton	Labour				
1910 by	William Kearsley	Labour				
1910	William Kearsley	Labour				

== Election results ==
=== Elections in the 1910s ===
==== 1910 ====
1910 New South Wales state election: Northumberland
Party	Candidate	Votes	%	±%
Labour	William Kearsley	7,389	79.1	
Independent Liberal	Reginald Harris	1,957	20.9	
Total formal votes		9,346	97.6	
Informal votes		228	2.4	
Turnout		9,574	56.9	
Labour hold				

==== 1910 by-election ====
1910 Northumberland by-election Wednesday 23 March
Party	Candidate	Votes	%	±%
Labor	William Kearsley	Unopposed		
Labor hold				

Matthew Charlton (Labor) resigned to successfully contest the 1910 federal election for Hunter.

=== Elections in the 1900s ===
==== 1907 ====
1907 New South Wales state election: Northumberland
Party	Candidate	Votes	%	±%
Labour	Matthew Charlton	3,749	69.2	
Liberal Reform	John Sutton	1,668	30.8	
Total formal votes		5,417	96.5	
Informal votes		197	3.5	
Turnout		5,614	45.8	
Labour hold				

==== 1904 ====
1904 New South Wales state election: Northumberland
Party	Candidate	Votes	%	±%
Labour	Matthew Charlton	2,009	54.9	
Independent Liberal	Reginald Harris	1,005	27.5	
Liberal Reform	John Fitzpatrick	543	14.9	
Independent	Alfred Jacques	60	1.6	
Total formal votes		3,657	98.2	
Informal votes		67	1.8	
Turnout		3,724	46.2	
Labour gain from Independent				

Northumberland lost part of the district to Hartley and The Hawkesbury and was expanded to include parts of the abolished seats of East Maitland, West Maitland and Wallsend. The member for Northumberland was John Norton (Independent) who successfully contested Surry Hills. The member for West Maitland, John Gillies (Independent), defeated the member for East Maitland, James Brunker (Liberal Reform), for Maitland. The member for Wallsend was John Estell (Labour) who successfully contested Waratah while the member for Waratah was Matthew Charlton (Labour). John Fitzpatrick was the member for Rylstone.

==== 1901 ====
1901 New South Wales state election: Northumberland
Party	Candidate	Votes	%	±%
Independent	John Norton	unopposed		
Independent gain from Protectionist				

Richard Stevenson (Protectionist) died in 1899 and John Norton (Independent) won the seat in a by-election.

=== Elections in the 1890s ===
==== 1899 by-election ====
1899 Northumberland colonial by-election
Party	Candidate	Votes	%	±%
Ind. Protectionist	John Norton	838	52.6	+52.6
Free Trade	Henry Wheeler	655	41.1	−6.1
Federalist	William Snape	52	3.3	+3.3
Independent	Charles Duffy	33	2.1	+2.1
Independent	George Black	11	0.7	+0.7
Federalist	William Melville (withdrawn)	3	0.2	+0.2
Protectionist	William Schey (withdrawn)	2	0.1	−52.7
Total formal votes		1,594	98.5	−0.7
Informal votes		24	1.5	+0.7
Turnout		1,618	66.3	−0.6
Ind. Protectionist gain from Protectionist		Swing	N/A	

==== 1898 ====
1898 New South Wales colonial election: Northumberland
Party	Candidate	Votes	%	±%
National Federal	Richard Stevenson	823	52.8	
Free Trade	Henry Wheeler	735	47.2	
Total formal votes		1,558	99.2	
Informal votes		12	0.8	
Turnout		1,570	66.9	
National Federal gain from Free Trade				

==== 1895 ====
1895 New South Wales colonial election: Northumberland
Party	Candidate	Votes	%	±%
Free Trade	Henry Wheeler	719	52.8	
Protectionist	Richard Stevenson	643	47.2	
Total formal votes		1,362	99.4	
Informal votes		8	0.6	
Turnout		1,370	72.5	
Free Trade gain from Protectionist				

==== 1894 ====
1894 New South Wales colonial election: Northumberland
Party	Candidate	Votes	%	±%
Protectionist	Richard Stevenson	670	45.2	
Free Trade	Henry Wheeler	623	42.0	
Labour	James Donnelly	191	12.9	
Total formal votes		1,484	99.4	
Informal votes		9	0.6	
Turnout		1,493	78.5	
Protectionist win		(previously 3 members)		

==== 1891 ====
1891 New South Wales colonial election: Northumberland Wednesday 24 June
Party	Candidate	Votes	%	±%
Protectionist	Thomas Walker (re-elected 1)	3,686	26.2	
Protectionist	Ninian Melville (re-elected 2)	2,892	20.5	
Labour	Alfred Edden (elected 3)	2,879	20.4	
Labour	James Thompson	2,551	18.1	
Protectionist	Joseph Creer (defeated)	2,089	14.8	
Total formal votes		14,097	99.6	
Informal votes		52	0.4	
Turnout		5,396	72.5	
Protectionist hold 2				
Labour gain 1 from Protectionist				

=== Elections in the 1880s ===
==== 1889 ====
1889 New South Wales colonial election: Northumberland Monday 4 February
Party	Candidate	Votes	%	±%
Protectionist	Joseph Creer (elected 1)	3,433	31.5	
Protectionist	Ninian Melville (elected 2)	3,403	31.3	
Protectionist	Thomas Walker (elected 3)	3,257	29.9	
Free Trade	Josiah Wright	791	7.3	
Total formal votes		10,884	99.4	
Informal votes		62	0.6	
Turnout		4,245	64.7	
Protectionist hold 2				
Member changed to Protectionist from Ind. Protectionist				

==== 1887 ====
1887 New South Wales colonial election: Northumberland Thursday 17 February
Party	Candidate	Votes	%	±%
Protectionist	Ninian Melville (re-elected 1)	2,399	23.2	
Protectionist	Thomas Walker (elected 2)	2,323	22.5	
Ind. Protectionist	Joseph Creer (re-elected 3)	2,069	20.0	
Protectionist	John Osborne	1,952	18.9	
Free Trade	Nicholas Downing	1,010	9.8	
Protectionist	Andrew Love	578	5.6	
Total formal votes		10,331	99.3	
Informal votes		71	0.7	
Turnout		4,117	75.1	
		(1 new seat)		

==== 1885 ====
1885 New South Wales colonial election: Northumberland Friday 16 October
Candidate	Votes	%
Joseph Creer (elected 1)	1,662	27.1
Ninian Melville (re-elected 2)	1,539	25.1
Thomas Walker	1,287	21.0
Joseph Gorrick (defeated)	871	14.2
George Perry	598	9.8
Richard Luscombe (defeated)	176	2.9
Total formal votes	6,133	98.8
Informal votes	73	1.2
Turnout	6,206	63.6

Joseph Gorrick was the sitting member for Wollombi.

==== 1884 by-election ====
1884 Northumberland by-election Saturday 26 May
Candidate	Votes	%
Richard Luscombe (elected)	962	38.7
William Christie	484	19.5
Thomas Hungerford	403	16.2
Total formal votes	2,487	97.3
Informal votes	69	2.7
Turnout	2,556	68.1

Atkinson Tighe resigned.

==== 1882 ====
1882 New South Wales colonial election: Northumberland Saturday 9 December
Candidate	Votes	%
Ninian Melville (re-elected 1)	1,897	43.0
Atkinson Tighe (elected 2)	1,312	29.8
William Christie	1,200	27.2
Total formal votes	4,409	99.5
Informal votes	21	0.5
Turnout	2,530	71.0

==== 1882 by-election ====
1882 Northumberland by-election Wednesday 18 January
Candidate	Votes	%
Thomas Hungerford (elected)	1,339	53.7
William Grisdale	1,155	46.3
Total formal votes	2,494	98.4
Informal votes	40	1.6
Turnout	2,534	71.0

William Turner resigned.

==== 1880 ====
1880 New South Wales colonial election: Northumberland Friday 26 November
Candidate	Votes	%
Ninian Melville (re-elected 1)	1,978	37.5
William Turner (elected 2)	1,616	30.6
Thomas Hungerford	1,191	22.6
Thomas Dalveen	491	9.3
Total formal votes	5,276	99.6
Informal votes	20	0.4
Turnout	2,906	77.2
	(1 new seat)	

==== 1880 by-election ====
1880 Northumberland by-election Friday 30 April
Candidate	Votes	%
Ninian Melville (elected)	1,240	42.0
Joseph Creer	931	31.6
Sir William Gordon	749	25.4
George Maclean	30	1.0
Total formal votes	2,950	96.3
Informal votes	112	3.7
Turnout	3,062	60.6

Thomas Hungerford resigned.

=== Elections in the 1870s ===
==== 1877 ====
1877 New South Wales colonial election: Northumberland Monday 29 October
Candidate	Votes	%
Thomas Hungerford (elected)	1,580	50.7
William Turner (defeated)	1,534	49.3
Total formal votes	3,114	97.7
Informal votes	75	2.4
Turnout	3,189	72.7

==== 1877 by-election ====
1877 Northumberland by-election Friday 20 July
Candidate	Votes	%
William Turner (elected)	1,558	63.9
Thomas Hungerford	481	19.7
Total formal votes	2,439	98.1
Informal votes	48	1.9
Turnout	2,487	80.4 (Note: Estimate based on an electoral roll of 3,095 at the 1874 election.)

Charles Stevens was insolvent.

==== 1874 ====
1874–75 New South Wales colonial election: Northumberland Thursday 17 December 1874
Candidate	Votes	%
Charles Stevens (elected)	1,305	54.7
James Hannell (defeated)	1,083	45.4
Total formal votes	2,388	97.6
Informal votes	59	2.4
Turnout	2,447	79.1

==== 1872 ====
1872 New South Wales colonial election: Northumberland Wednesday 21 February
Candidate	Votes	%
James Hannell (elected)	991	57.1
William Brookes (defeated)	387	22.3
Francis O'Brien	188	10.8
Thomas Adam	90	5.2
Henry Langley	68	3.9
James Pemell	13	0.8
Total formal votes	1,737	98.6
Informal votes	25	1.4
Turnout	1,762	65.5

=== Elections in the 1860s ===
==== 1869 ====
1869–70 New South Wales colonial election: Northumberland Thursday 9 December 1869
Candidate	Votes	%
William Brookes (elected)	760	43.7
Joseph Ward	430	24.7
F Shaw	350	20.1
Francis O'Brien	122	7.0
Charles Cleveland	69	4.0
Samuel Gordon	8	0.5
Total formal votes	1,739	96.9
Informal votes	55	3.1
Turnout	1,794	72.0

==== 1868 by-election ====
1868 Northumberland by-election Thursday 8 February
Candidate	Votes	%
Atkinson Tighe (re-elected)	783	67.3
Alexander Black	380	32.7
Total formal votes	1,163	96.5
Informal votes	42	3.5
Turnout	1,205	57.6

Atkinson Tighe was appointed Postmaster-General in the second Martin ministry.

==== 1864 ====
1864–65 New South Wales colonial election: Northumberland Saturday 24 December 1864
Candidate	Votes	%
Atkinson Tighe (re-elected)	630	62.1
William Brookes	384	37.9
Total formal votes	1,014	96.7
Informal votes	35	3.3
Turnout	1,049	57.2

==== 1862 by-election ====
1862 Northumberland by-election Tuesday 23 December
Candidate	Votes	%
Atkinson Tighe (elected)	339	50.6
William Brookes	331	49.4
Total formal votes	670	100.0
Informal votes	0	0.0
Turnout	670	44.4

Thomas Lewis was insolvent and resigned.

==== 1860 ====
1860 New South Wales colonial election: Northumberland Saturday 8 December
Candidate	Votes	%
Thomas Lewis (elected)	240	41.1
Alexander Scott (defeated)	235	40.2
Arthur Hodgson	109	18.7
Total formal votes	584	100.0
Informal votes	0	0.0
Turnout	623	62.8

=== Elections in the 1850s ===
==== 1859 ====
1859 New South Wales colonial election: Northumberland Friday 17 June
Candidate	Votes	%
Alexander Scott (re-elected)	unopposed	
