= 1884 Northumberland colonial by-election =

By-election in New South Wales, Australia

A by-election for the seat of Northumberland in the New South Wales Legislative Assembly was held on 26 May 1884 because of the resignation of Atkinson Tighe due to ill health.

== Dates ==
Date	Event
7 May 1884	Atkinson Tighe resigned.
8 May 1884	Writ of election issued by the Speaker of the Legislative Assembly.
22 May 1884	Day of nomination
26 May 1884	Polling day
3 June 1884	Return of writ

== Candidates ==
- William Christie was a surveyor from Sydney who stood unsuccessfully for Tenterfield in 1880, Northumberland and Gloucester in 1882.
- Thomas Hungerford was a free trader and a former member for Northumberland who had decided to stand for The Upper Hunter at the 1882 election but was defeated.
- Richard Luscombe was a co-founder of the Protection and Political Reform League with the other sitting member for Northumberland, Ninian Melville.

== Result ==
1884 Northumberland by-election Saturday 26 May
Candidate	Votes	%
Richard Luscombe (elected)	962	38.7
William Christie	484	19.5
Thomas Hungerford	403	16.2
Total formal votes	2,487	97.3
Informal votes	69	2.7
Turnout	2,556	68.1

== See also ==
- Electoral results for the district of Northumberland
- List of New South Wales state by-elections
