= 1899 Northumberland colonial by-election =

← 1898	20 June 1899	1901 →

Electoral district of Northumberland in the New South Wales Legislative Assembly
- Registered: 2,439
- Turnout: 66.3% (▼0.6)
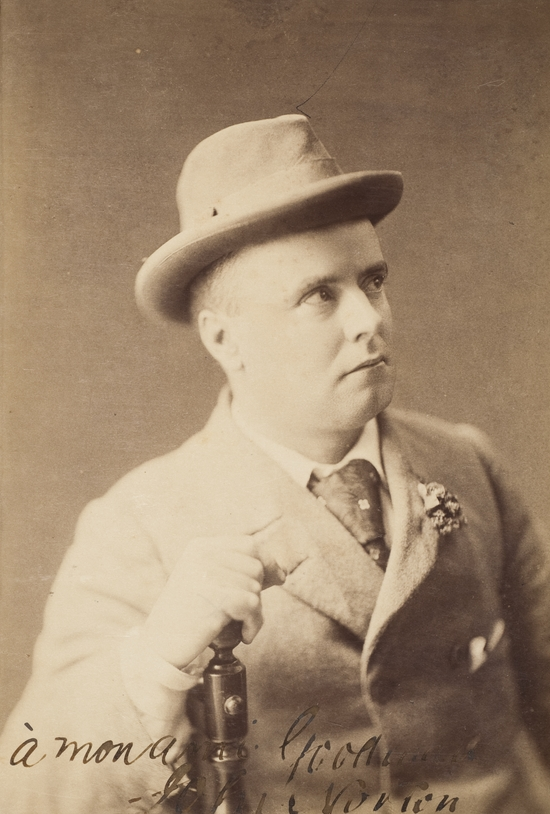

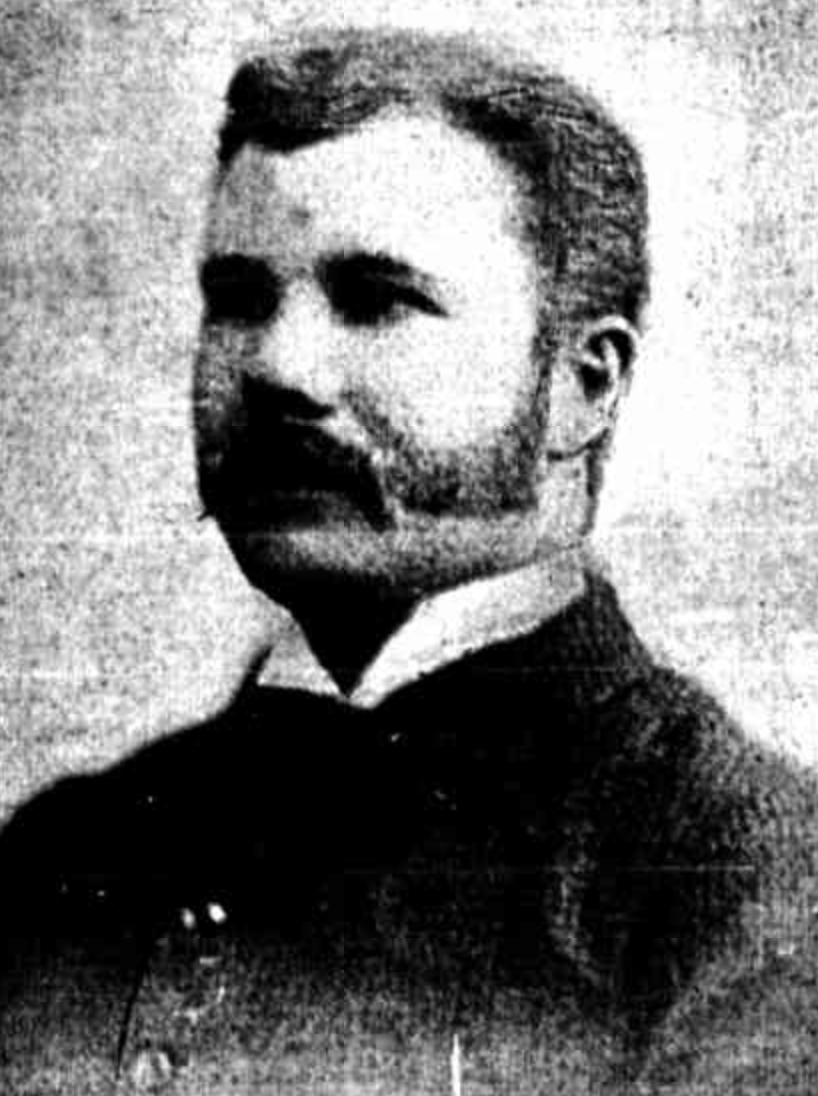
	First party	Second party
Candidate	John Norton	Henry Wheeler
Party	Ind. Protectionist	Free Trade
Popular vote	838	655
Percentage	52.6%	41.1%
Swing	▲52.6	▼6.1
MP before election
Richard Stevenson
Protectionist
Elected MP
William Zuill
Independent Protectionist

The 1899 Northumberland colonial by-election was held on 20 June 1899 to elect the member for Northumberland in the New South Wales Legislative Assembly, following the death of Protectionist MP Richard Stevenson. The vote was held on the same day as a statewide referendum on the subject of federation, which was an issue throughout the campaign.

Two candidates withdrew during the campaign. On 9 June 1899, Protectionist-endorsed candidate William Schey withdrew shortly after candidate nominations closed to avoid splitting the vote with Independent Protectionist candidate John Norton. Five days later, William Melville withdrew and endorsed fellow Federalist candidate William Snape.

Norton won the seat with 52.6% of the vote, defeating Free Trade candidate (and former Northumberland MP) Henry Wheeler.

== Key events ==
- 14 May 1899 − Richard Stevenson died
- 2 June 1899 − Writ of election issued by the Speaker of the Legislative Assembly
- 9 June 1899 − Candidate nominations
- 20 June 1899 − Polling day
- 24 June 1899 − Declaration of result
- 30 June 1899 − Return of writ

== Candidates ==
Party	Candidate	Background
Independent	George Black	Not the former MP of the same name
Independent	Charles Duffy	Not the former Premier of Victoria of the same name
Federalist	William Melville	Advocate for Federation
Ind. Protectionist	John Norton	Former MP for Sydney-Fitzroy
Protectionist	William Schey	Former MP for Redfern and Darlington
Federalist	William Snape	Advocate for Federation
Free Trade	Henry Wheeler	Former MP for Northumberland

== Result ==
1899 Northumberland colonial by-election
Party	Candidate	Votes	%	±%
Ind. Protectionist	John Norton	838	52.6	+52.6
Free Trade	Henry Wheeler	655	41.1	−6.1
Federalist	William Snape	52	3.3	+3.3
Independent	Charles Duffy	33	2.1	+2.1
Independent	George Black	11	0.7	+0.7
Federalist	William Melville (withdrawn)	3	0.2	+0.2
Protectionist	William Schey (withdrawn)	2	0.1	−52.7
Total formal votes		1,594	98.5	−0.7
Informal votes		24	1.5	+0.7
Turnout		1,618	66.3	−0.6
Ind. Protectionist gain from Protectionist		Swing	N/A	

== See also ==
- Electoral results for the district of Northumberland
- List of New South Wales state by-elections
