= 1877 Northumberland colonial by-election =

By-election in New South Wales, Australia

A by-election was held for the New South Wales Legislative Assembly electorate of Northumberland on 12 February 1877 because Charles Stevens was insolvent. Stevens had left the colony on an expedition to recover valuable property, including 2,576 ounces of gold from the General Grant, which wrecked off Auckland Island.

== Dates ==
Date	Event
26 June 1877	Charles Stevens declared insolvent.
6 July 1877	Charles Steven's seat of Northumberland was declared vacant by reason of insolvency.
7 July 1877	Writ of election issued by the Speaker of the Legislative Assembly.
18 July 1877	Nominations
20 July 1877	Polling day
27 July 1877	Return of writ

== Candidates ==
- Thomas Hungerford was a pastoralist and a former member for Upper Hunter however his election was overturned by the Election and Qualifications Committee and he was defeated in the resulting by-election.
- William Turner was a mining foreman at Wallsend. Members of parliament were unpaid at the time and Turner was supported by the local miners under the banner of the political reform league with funds raised by a subscription, said to be £0.08 per person.

== Result ==
1877 Northumberland by-election Friday 20 July
Candidate	Votes	%
William Turner (elected)	1,558	63.9
Thomas Hungerford	481	19.7
Total formal votes	2,439	98.1
Informal votes	48	1.9
Turnout	2,487	80.4 (Note: Estimate based on an electoral roll of 3,095 at the 1874 election.)

== See also ==
- Electoral results for the district of Northumberland
- List of New South Wales state by-elections
