= 1880 Northumberland colonial by-election =

By-election in New South Wales, Australia

A by-election was held for the New South Wales Legislative Assembly electorate of Northumberland on 30 April 1880 because Thomas Hungerford resigned attend to personal business matters.

== Dates ==
Date	Event
14 April 1880	Thomas Hungerford resigned.
15 April 1880	Writ of election issued by the Speaker of the Legislative Assembly.
28 April 1880	Nominations.
30 April 1880	Polling day between 9 am and 4 pm.
10 May 1880	Return of writ

== Candidates ==
- Joseph Creer was a cabinet maker and Newcastle councillor. This was his first candidacy for the Legislative Assembly.
- Sir William Gordon was a surgeon from Murrurundi. This was his tenth and final time standing unsuccessfully for the Legislative Assembly.
- George Maclean was a free selector. He had previously stood unsuccessfully for the Liverpool Plains by-election in 1876.
- Ninian Melville was chairman of the Working Men's Defence Association and campaigned on a platform of protectionism and opposition to assisted immigration. He had twice been defeated for East Sydney in 1877 at the by-election in August and the general election in October.

== Result ==
1880 Northumberland by-election Friday 30 April
Candidate	Votes	%
Ninian Melville (elected)	1,240	42.0
Joseph Creer	931	31.6
Sir William Gordon	749	25.4
George Maclean	30	1.0
Total formal votes	2,950	96.3
Informal votes	112	3.7
Turnout	3,062	60.6

== See also ==
- Electoral results for the district of Northumberland
- List of New South Wales state by-elections
