= 1882 Northumberland colonial by-election =

By-election in New South Wales, Australia

A by-election was held for the New South Wales Legislative Assembly electorate of Northumberland on 18 January 1882 because of the resignation of William Turner. Members of parliament were unpaid at the time. Turner was paid by a subscription, said to be £0.08 per member of the Reform League. Subscriptions however proved to be inadequate to support him and he resigned from parliament.

== Dates ==
Date	Event
20 December 1881	William Turner resigned.
23 December 1881	Writ of election issued by the Speaker of the Legislative Assembly.
16 January 1882	Nominations at Waratah
18 January 1882	Polling day
20 February 1882	Return of writ

== Candidates ==
- William Grisdale was an auctioneer and Newcastle Alderman. This was his first time standing for the Legislative Assembly and he died the following month.
- Thomas Hungerford was a pastoralist and a former member for Northumberland who had been defeated by William Turner at the 1880 election.

== Result ==
1882 Northumberland by-election Wednesday 18 January
Candidate	Votes	%
Thomas Hungerford (elected)	1,339	53.7
William Grisdale	1,155	46.3
Total formal votes	2,494	98.4
Informal votes	40	1.6
Turnout	2,534	71.0

== See also ==
- Electoral results for the district of Northumberland
- List of New South Wales state by-elections
