= 1868 Northumberland colonial by-election =

By-election in New South Wales, Australia

A by-election was held for the New South Wales Legislative Assembly electorate of Northumberland in 1868 because Atkinson Tighe had been appointed Postmaster-General in the second Martin ministry. Such ministerial by-elections were usually uncontested.

Alexander Black was a former Crown Lands Commissioner, the brother of John Black, the former Secretary for Lands. He campaigned against an unpopular government. This was the first occasion on which he stood for parliament.

== Dates ==
Date	Event
29 September 1868	Atkinson Tighe appointed Postmaster-General.
30 September 1868	Writ of election issued by the Speaker of the Legislative Assembly.
8 October 1868	Nominations at Newcastle.
10 October 1868	Polling day.
17 October 1868	Return of writ

== Polling places ==
- Newcastle
- Burwood
- Pittown
- Hexham

== Result ==
1868 Northumberland by-election Thursday 8 February
Candidate	Votes	%
Atkinson Tighe (re-elected)	783	67.3
Alexander Black	380	32.7
Total formal votes	1,163	96.5
Informal votes	42	3.5
Turnout	1,205	57.6

== See also ==
- Electoral results for the district of Northumberland
- List of New South Wales state by-elections
