= List of mayors of Adamstown =

People who served as the mayor of the Municipality of Adamstown are:

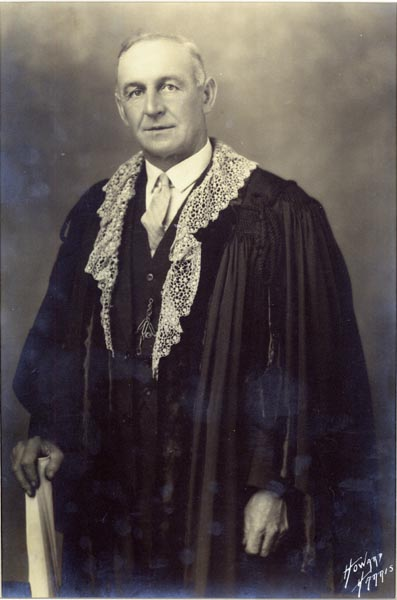
James Wiggins, Mayor (1928–29)

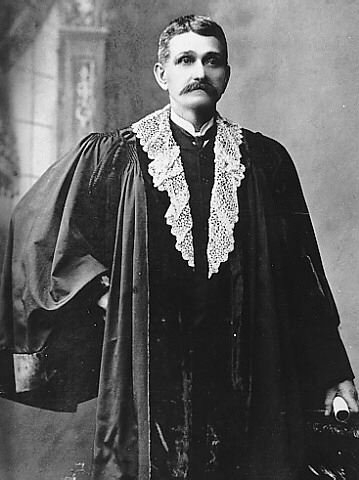
James Bullerwell, Mayor (1909-10)

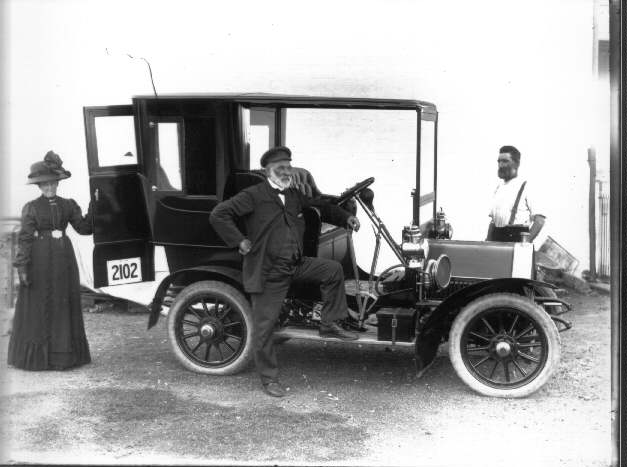
James Gray, Mayor (1899–1900, 1902–03, 1915–16)

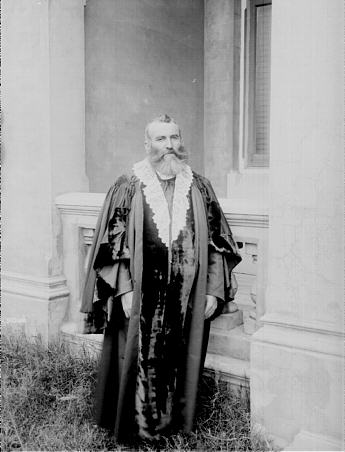
Jeremiah Robinson, Mayor (1897–98, 1904)

No	Mayors	Start	End	Time in office	Notes
1	Thomas Weir	10 March 1886	9 February 1887	336 days	
2	Henry Evans	10 February 1887	14 February 1888	1 year, 4 days	
3	Thomas Hetherington	15 February 1888	11 February 1889	362 days	
4	Alfred Edden	12 February 1889	10 February 1890	363 days	
5	Thomas Frith	11 February 1890	9 February 1891	363 days	
(4)	Alfred Edden	10 February 1891	5 July 1891	145 days	
6	John Sheedy	6 July 1891	8 February 1892	217 days	
7	Richard Adams	9 February 1892	13 February 1893	1 year, 4 days	
8	John Carr	14 February 1893	12 February 1894	363 days	
9	John Thwaites	13 February 1894	11 February 1895	363 days	
(6)	John Sheedy	12 February 1895	26 July 1895	164 days	
9	John Thwaites	27 July 1895	10 February 1896	198 days	
10	Jeremiah Jennings	11 February 1896	8 February 1897	363 days	
11	Jeremiah Robinson	9 February 1897	7 February 1898	363 days	
12	Matthew Lydon	8 February 1898	13 February 1899	1 year, 5 days	
13	James Gray	14 February 1899	12 February 1900	363 days	
14	William Court	13 February 1900	13 February 1901	1 year, 0 days	
(9)	John Thwaites	14 February 1901	11 February 1902	362 days	
(13)	James Gray	12 February 1902	9 February 1903	362 days	
(12)	Matthew Lydon	10 February 1903	8 February 1904	363 days	
(11)	Jeremiah Robinson	9 February 1904	9 February 1905	1 year, 0 days	
15	Stephen Powell	10 February 1905	12 February 1906	1 year, 2 days	
(14)	William Court	13 February 1906	4 February 1907	356 days	
16	Thomas Rutherford	5 February 1907	6 February 1908	1 year, 1 day	
17	Theophilus Robin	7 February 1908	7 February 1909	1 year, 0 days	
18	James Bullerwell	8 February 1909	10 February 1910	1 year, 2 days	
19	John Gellately	11 February 1910	2 February 1911	356 days	
20	William Angus	3 February 1911	4 February 1912	1 year, 1 day	
21	Anthony Shaw	5 February 1912	2 February 1913	363 days	
(17)	Theophilus Robin	3 February 1913	7 February 1915	2 years, 4 days	
(13)	James Gray	8 February 1915	8 February 1916	1 year, 0 days	
(17)	Theophilus Robin	9 February 1916	5 February 1918	1 year, 361 days	
22	Allan Cameron	6 February 1918	24 February 1920	2 years, 18 days	
23	Benjamin Saunders	25 February 1920	21 December 1920	300 days	
24	Joshua Arthur	22 December 1920	11 December 1923	2 years, 354 days	
25	James Cousins	12 December 1923	9 December 1924	363 days	
26	Robert Coote	10 December 1924	7 December 1926	1 year, 362 days	
27	Frank Moxey	8 December 1926	4 December 1928	1 year, 362 days	
(25)	James Cousins	7 December 1927	4 December 1928	363 days	
28	James Wiggins	5 December 1928	3 December 1929	363 days	
29	David Lloyd	4 December 1929	2 December 1930	363 days	
(22)	Allan Cameron	3 December 1930	7 December 1931	1 year, 4 days	
30	John Williams	8 December 1931	3 December 1932	361 days	
31	Albert Bartley	4 December 1932	9 December 1934	2 years, 5 days	
(29)	David Lloyd	11 December 1933	9 December 1934	363 days	
(22)	Allan Cameron	10 December 1934	8 December 1936	1 year, 364 days	
25	James Cousins	14 April 1936	8 December 1936	238 days	
32	William Warnock	9 December 1936	1 April 1938	1 year, 113 days	

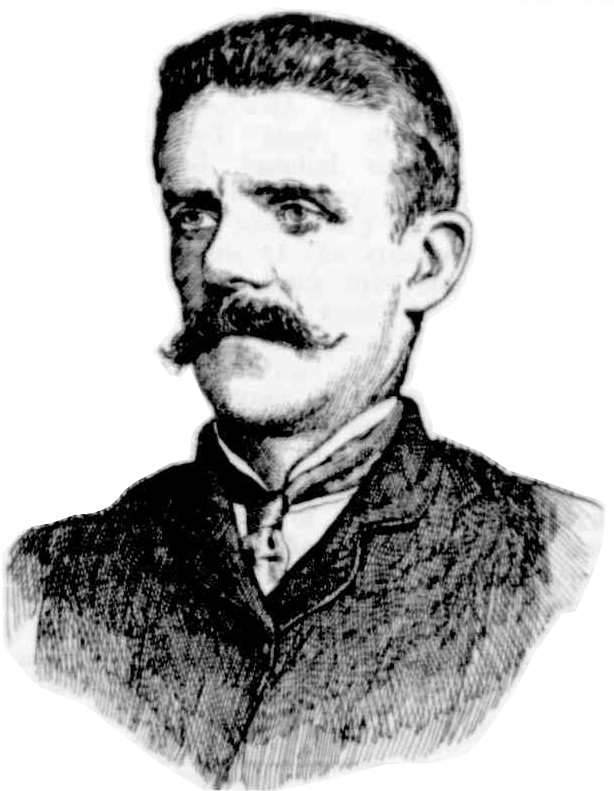
Alfred Edden, Mayor (1889-90, 1891)

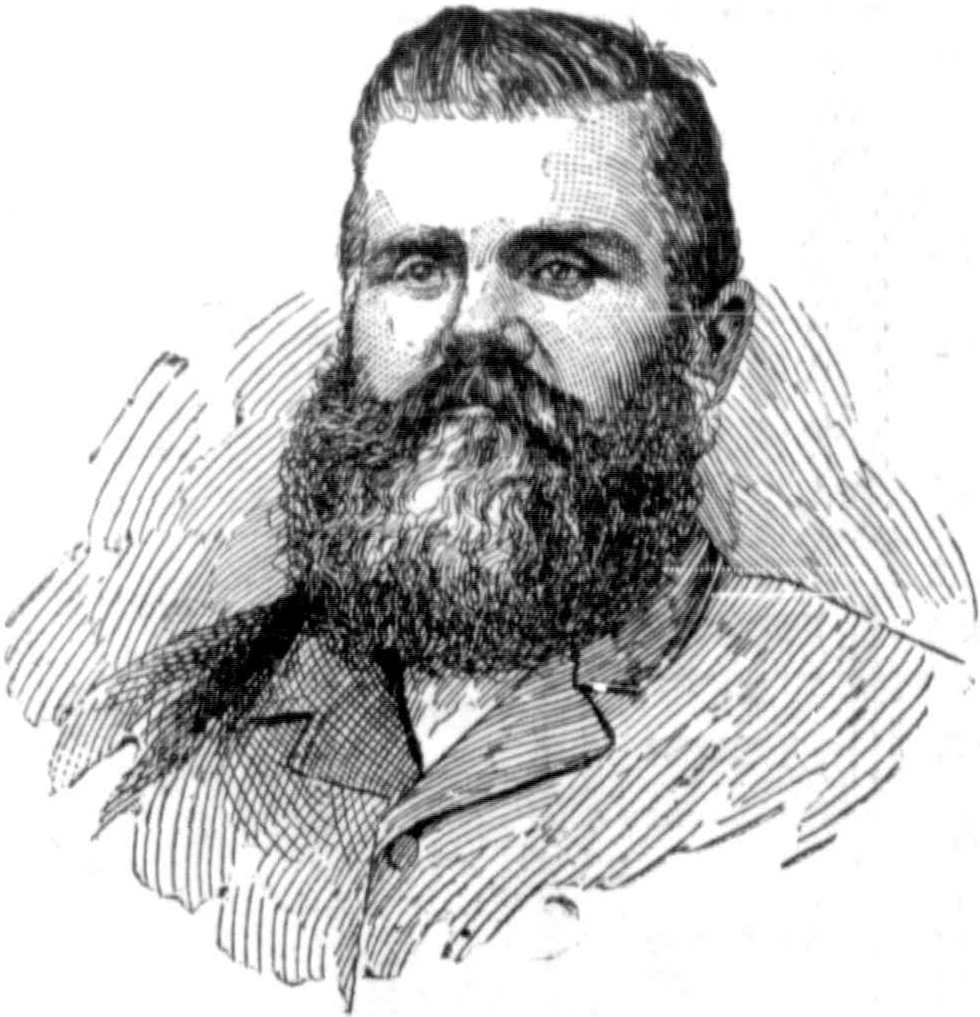
Thomas Hetherington, Mayor (1888-89)
