= 1910 Northumberland state by-election =

Election result for Northumberland, New South Wales, Australia

A by-election was held for the New South Wales Legislative Assembly electorate of Northumberland on 23 March 1910. The by-election was triggered by the resignation of Matthew Charlton (Labor) to successfully contest the 1910 federal election for Hunter.

== Dates ==
Date	Event
28 February 1910	Resignation of Matthew Charlton.
8 March 1910	Writ of election issued by the Speaker of the Legislative Assembly.
23 March 1910	Nominations
13 April 1910	Polling day and 1910 Federal election
3 May 1910	Return of writ

== Results ==
1910 Northumberland by-election Wednesday 23 March
Party	Candidate	Votes	%	±%
Labor	William Kearsley	Unopposed		
Labor hold				

== See also ==
- Electoral results for the district of Northumberland
- List of New South Wales state by-elections
