= List of mayors of Ashfield =

People who served as the mayor of the Municipality of Ashfield are:

#	Mayor	Party	Term start	Term end	Notes
1	John Pope		1872	1873	
2	Daniel Holborow		1874	1880	
3	Thomas Nicholson		1881	1881	
4	Mark Hammond		1882	1884	
5	John Watkin		1884	1884	
1 (2nd term)	John Pope		1885	1885	
6	Joseph Mortley		1886	1887	
7	Joseph Watkin		1888	1888	
8	Thomas Dean		1888	1888	
9	Robert Dougan		1889	1890	
10	Albert Brown		1891	1892	
11	Richard Stanton		1893	7 March 1895	
12	Ninian Melville	Protectionist	8 March 1895	23 February 1896	
13	John Upward		24 February 1896	1897	
14	Francis Josephson		1898	1898	
15	William Robson	Free Trade	1899	1899	
16	John Mills		1900	1900	
17	Ernest Broughton	Liberal Reform	1901	1902	
18	Arthur Miller	Liberal Reform	1903	1905	
11 (2nd term)	Richard Stanton		1906	1906	
19	Charles Websdale		1907	1907	
20	George Brown		1908	1908	
21	Herbert Pratten	Liberal Reform	1909	1911	
22	Alfred Crane	Liberal Reform	1911	1912	
23	Charles Algie		1913	1914	
24	John Hammond		1915	1917	
25	John Yeo		1917	1919	
26	Frank Hedger	Nationalist	1919	1920	
27	George Watson	Nationalist	1920	1922	
24 (2nd term)	John Hammond		1922	1923	
28	D McDonald	Nationalist	1923	1925	
26 (2nd term)	Frank Hedger	Nationalist	1925	1929	
29	Henry Gough	Nationalist	1929	1932	
30	John Lapish	United Australia	1932	1933	
31	William Grainger	United Australia	1933	1935	
32	Thomas Cavill	United Australia	1935	1938	
33	Edward Allman	United Australia	1938	1943	
34	J Lindsay		1943	1944	
32 (2nd term)	Thomas Cavill	Liberal	1944	1946	
35	Ralph Tetley	Liberal	1946	1948	
36	Thomas Marshall	Independent	1948	1950	
37	Richard Murden	Liberal	1950	1952	
38	Herbert Bailey	Liberal	1952	1954	
39	James Blackwood		1954	1957	
40	Charles Bullivant		1957	1959	
41	Darrell Jackson		1959	1962	
42	William Peters	Labor	1962	1964	
43	Bede Spillane	Labor	1964	1965	
44	Allan Crawford		1965	1967	
37 (2nd term)	Richard Murden	Liberal	December 1967	September 1972	
45	Paul Whelan	Labor	September 1972	September 1976	
46	Lew Herman	Labor	September 1976	September 1991	
47	Dr John Ward	Independent	September 1991	September 1995	
46 (2nd term)	Lew Herman	Labor	September 1995	September 1996	
48	Vincent Sicari	No Aircraft Noise	September 1996	September 1997	
49	Mark Bonanno	Labor	September 1997	March 2004	
50	Rae Desmond Jones	Labor	March 2004	September 2006	
51	Ted Cassidy	Independent	September 2006	September 2011	
52	Lyall Kennedy	Greens	September 2011	September 2012	
53	Morris Mansour	Independent	September 2012	September 2013	
54	Lucille McKenna	Labor	September 2013	12 May 2016	
