= Thomas Walker (Australian politician) =

Politician from NSW & Western Australia

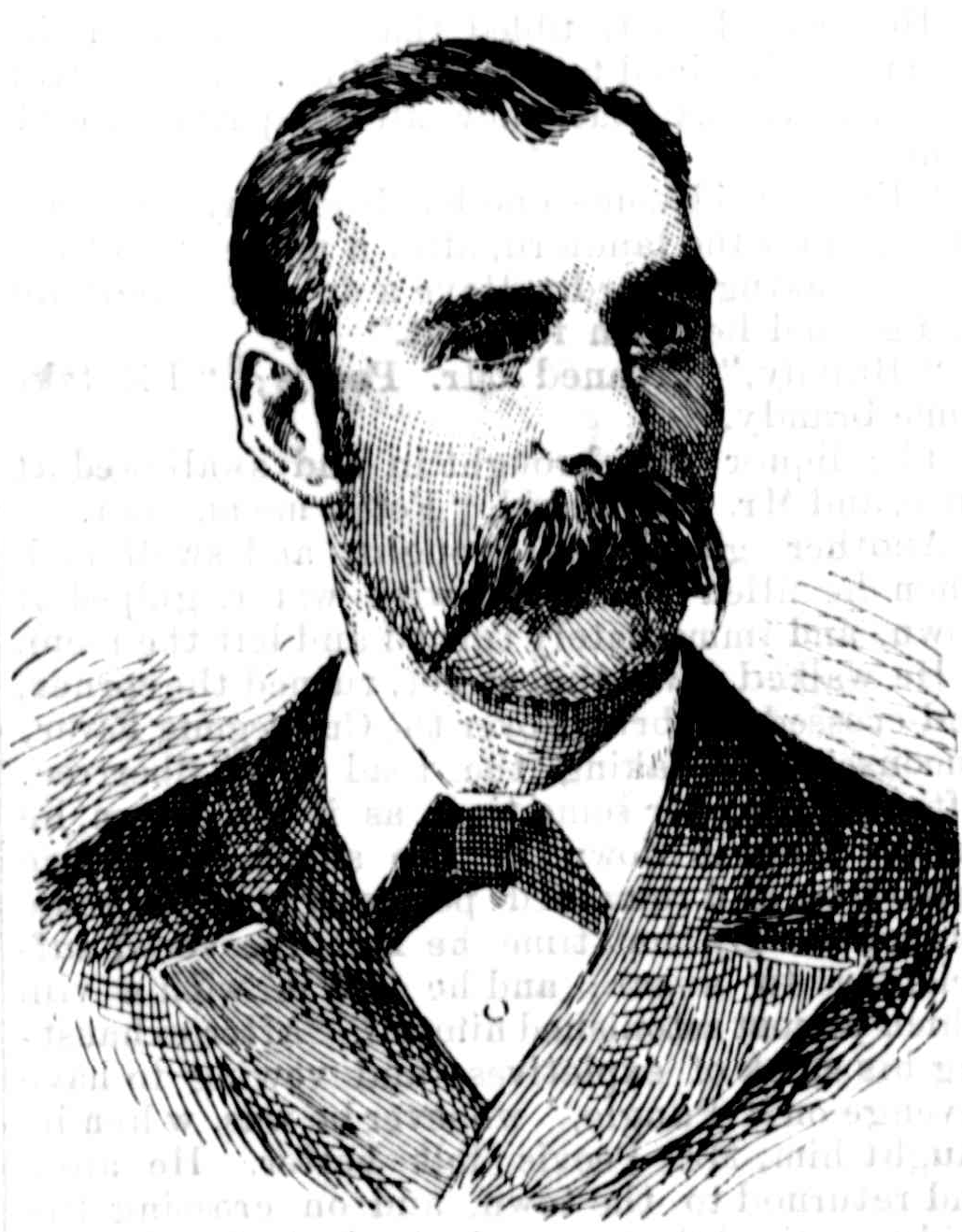
- Thomas Walker

9th Speaker of the Western Australian Legislative Assembly
- In office 24 July 1924 – 29 July 1930
- Preceded by: George Taylor
- Succeeded by: Sydney Stubbs

Attorney-General of Western Australia
- In office 7 October 1911 – 27 July 1916
- Premier: John Scaddan
- Preceded by: John Nanson
- Succeeded by: Robert Robinson

Member of the Western Australian Legislative Assembly for Kanowna
- In office 27 October 1905 – 10 May 1932
- Preceded by: Robert Hastie
- Succeeded by: Emil Nulsen

Member of the New South Wales Legislative Assembly for Northumberland
- In office 17 February 1887 – 25 June 1894
- Preceded by: Joseph Creer
- Succeeded by: Richard Stevenson

Personal details
- Born: 5 February 1858 Preston, Lancashire, England
- Died: 10 May 1932 (aged 74) Inglewood, Western Australia
- Resting place: Karrakatta Cemetery
- Party: Labor
- Other political affiliations: Protectionist
- Spouse: Andrietta Maria Somers (m. 1881)
- Children: 4
- Education: Leyland Grammar School
- Occupation: Lecturer, journalist, politician

Thomas Walker (5 February 1858 – 10 May 1932) was an English-born Australian politician, a member of the New South Wales Legislative Assembly and the Western Australian Legislative Assembly.

== Early life ==
Walker was born in Preston, Lancashire, England, the son of corn miller and merchant Thomas Walker, and Ellen (née Eccles). He was educated at Leyland Grammar School, then worked as a schoolteacher at Preston for two years. He then emigrated to Canada, where he worked as a farmhand and chemist's assistant. After returning to the United Kingdom he work as a journalist on the Preston Herald. He later spent some time in Toledo, Ohio, where he spent 1876 lecturing on evolution and the occult. The following year he toured through New South Wales, England and South Africa, lecturing on spiritualism and politics.

Walker returned to Australia in 1882, spending some time in Victoria before settling in New South Wales. He became a prominent public figure through his political lectures, in which he argued for secularism and an immediate separation of New South Wales from England. In February 1885 he played a prominent role in a meeting held to discuss British government policy towards the Pacific Islands, and shortly afterwards he was involved in opposing the deployment of New South Wales troops to the Sudan.

== New South Wales politics ==
On 17 February 1887 Walker was elected to the New South Wales Legislative Assembly seat of Northumberland as a Protectionist. He continued to push for separation from England, helping to form the short-lived Republican Union and Republican League. He held his Legislative Assembly seat until the election of 25 June 1894, when he unsuccessfully contested the seat of Wallsend. He contested the seat again the following year without success.

Some time after 1894, Walker visited New Zealand, where he taught elocution, promoted temperance, lectured on various subjects, and wrote for the press. On returning to New South Wales he unsuccessfully contested the seat of Sturt in 1898.

== Journalism ==
In 1899, Walker emigrated to Western Australia. He found work as a journalist with the Sunday Times in Perth, and later with the Kalgoorlie newspapers Sun and Kalgoorlie Miner. He became editor of the Sunday Times in 1901, and was also editor of the Sun until 1905. It was while editor for the Sunday Times that he is believed to have written the article "Corruption by Contract" condemning C. Y. O'Connor and the Golden Pipeline scheme. This article is generally believed to have contributed to O'Connor's suicide.

== Western Australian politics ==
On 27 October 1905, Walker was elected to the Western Australian Legislative Assembly seat of Kanowna on a Labor ticket. He held the seat until his death over 25 years later. From around 1906 he began studying law, and in 1911 was admitted to the Western Australian bar. He was a member of the Senate of the University of Western Australia from 1912 to 1916.

When the Labor party won government under John Scaddan on 7 October 1911, Walker was appointed Minister for Justice and Education, and Attorney General. He held both portfolios until the Scaddan government's defeat on 27 July 1916. He was Speaker of the Western Australian Legislative Assembly from 24 July 1924 to 29 July 1930.

== Personal life and death ==
Walker had 4 children with his wife Andrietta Maria Somers, who he married in 1881. He died at Inglewood on 10 May 1932 (aged 74), and was buried in Karrakatta Cemetery.

New South Wales Legislative Assembly
Preceded by Joseph Creer; Ninian Melville	Member for Northumberland; 1887 – 1894; With: Joseph Creer/Alfred Edden; Ninian Melville	Succeeded by Richard Stevenson
Parliament of Western Australia
Political offices
Preceded by John Nanson	Attorney General; 1911 – 1916	Succeeded by Robert Robinson
Preceded by John Nanson	Minister for Justice and Education; 1911 – 1916	Succeeded by Hal Colebatch as Minister for Education
Western Australian Legislative Assembly
Preceded by George Taylor	Speaker of the Legislative Assembly; 1924 – 1930	Succeeded by Sydney Stubbs
Preceded by Robert Hastie	Member for Kanowna; 1905 – 1932	Succeeded by Emil Nulsen
