= William Brookes (New South Wales politician) =

Australian politician

William Brookes was an Australian politician.

He migrated to Australia around 1854 and settled near Newcastle. Although he was referred to as "Dr Brookes", he was not practising medicine at this time. In 1869 he was elected to the New South Wales Legislative Assembly for Northumberland, serving until his defeat in 1872.

New South Wales Legislative Assembly
Preceded by Atkinson Tighe	Member for Northumberland; 1869–1872	Succeeded by James Hannell
