= Municipality of Adamstown =

Former local government area in New South Wales, Australia

Coordinates: 32°56′04″S 151°43′33″E

Municipality of Adamstown New South Wales
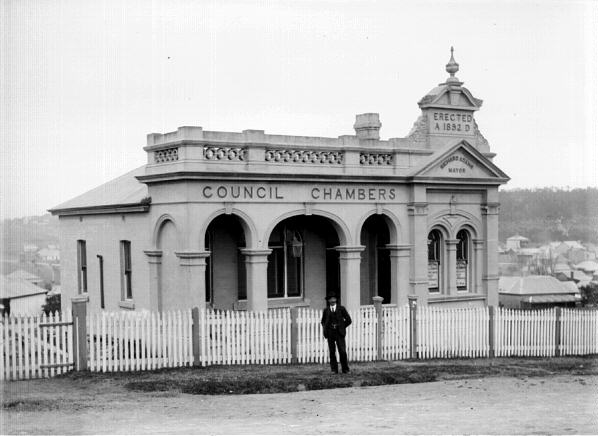
- Adamstown Council Chambers c 1891
- Population: 3,959 (1921 census)
  - Density: 1,320/km^{2} (3,420/sq mi)
- Established: 31 December 1885
- Abolished: 2 April 1938
- Area: 3.0 km^{2} (1.2 sq mi)
- Region: Hunter Region
- County: Northumberland
- Parish: Kahibah
LGAs around Municipality of Adamstown:
| Lambton | Waratah | Hamilton |
| New Lambton | Municipality of Adamstown | Merewether |
| Wallsend | Lake Macquarie | Merewether |

Municipality of Adamstown was a Local Government Area of New South Wales from 1886 until 1938 when it became part of the City of Greater Newcastle. It was named after and comprised the township of Adamstown near Newcastle.

The township had been established in 1869. The Municipalities Act of 1857 provided that an area could become a municipality if there was a petition of at least 50 people who would be ratepayers in the district. Most of the nearby towns had become municipalities in the 1870s and 209 people signed a petition for Adamstown that was published in March 1885. The main reason for becoming a municipality was for roads, drains and nightsoil collection. The major employer in town was coal mining. The municipality was proclaimed on 31 December 1885 and its main boundaries were Hamilton and Merewether to the east, while the railway formed the north western boundary separating it from New Lambton.

The first council election was held on Saturday 6 March 1886, electing 9 aldermen to serve a 3-year term, including Alfred Edden, who was President of the Waratah colliery lodge. The aldermen unanimously elected Thomas Weir as the inaugural mayor of Adamstown.

Women were not eligible to serve on the council until 1919, however no women were subsequently elected.

There had been proposals to merge the "pocket-handkerchief municipalities" surrounding Newcastle since 1891, including the Greater Newcastle Royal Commission in 1919, however this did not eventuate until 1937 when the Greater Newcastle Act 1937 merged Adamstown and 9 other municipalities with City of Newcastle to create the City of Greater Newcastle. The date of the amalgamation was 2 April 1938.

== Mayors ==
People who served as the mayor of the Municipality of Adamstown are:

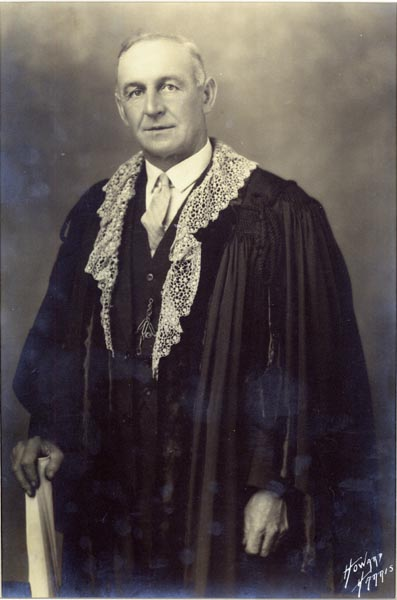
James Wiggins, Mayor (1928–29)

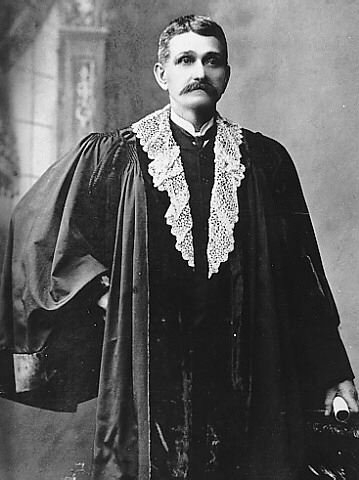
James Bullerwell, Mayor (1909-10)

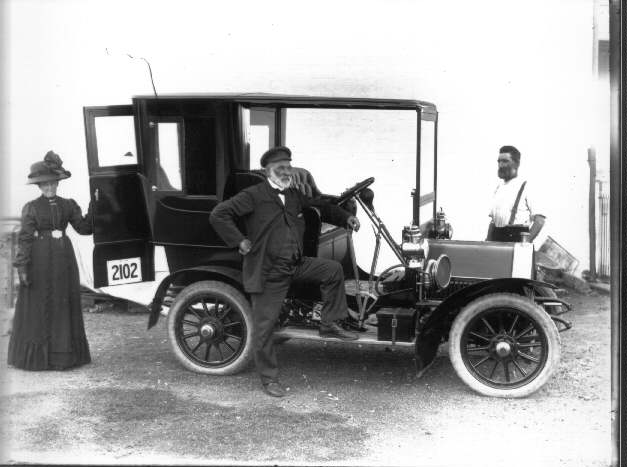
James Gray, Mayor (1899–1900, 1902–03, 1915–16)

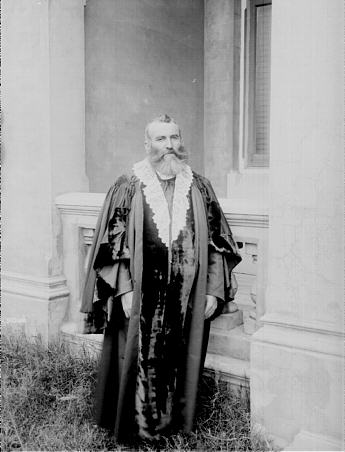
Jeremiah Robinson, Mayor (1897–98, 1904)

| No | Mayors | Start | End | Time in office | Notes |
|---|---|---|---|---|---|
| 1 | Thomas Weir | 10 March 1886 | 9 February 1887 | 336 days | |
| 2 | Henry Evans | 10 February 1887 | 14 February 1888 | 1 year, 4 days | |
| 3 | Thomas Hetherington | 15 February 1888 | 11 February 1889 | 362 days | |
| 4 | Alfred Edden | 12 February 1889 | 10 February 1890 | 363 days | |
| 5 | Thomas Frith | 11 February 1890 | 9 February 1891 | 363 days | |
| (4) | Alfred Edden | 10 February 1891 | 5 July 1891 | 145 days | |
| 6 | John Sheedy | 6 July 1891 | 8 February 1892 | 217 days | |
| 7 | Richard Adams | 9 February 1892 | 13 February 1893 | 1 year, 4 days | |
| 8 | John Carr | 14 February 1893 | 12 February 1894 | 363 days | |
| 9 | John Thwaites | 13 February 1894 | 11 February 1895 | 363 days | |
| (6) | John Sheedy | 12 February 1895 | 26 July 1895 | 164 days | |
| 9 | John Thwaites | 27 July 1895 | 10 February 1896 | 198 days | |
| 10 | Jeremiah Jennings | 11 February 1896 | 8 February 1897 | 363 days | |
| 11 | Jeremiah Robinson | 9 February 1897 | 7 February 1898 | 363 days | |
| 12 | Matthew Lydon | 8 February 1898 | 13 February 1899 | 1 year, 5 days | |
| 13 | James Gray | 14 February 1899 | 12 February 1900 | 363 days | |
| 14 | William Court | 13 February 1900 | 13 February 1901 | 1 year, 0 days | |
| (9) | John Thwaites | 14 February 1901 | 11 February 1902 | 362 days | |
| (13) | James Gray | 12 February 1902 | 9 February 1903 | 362 days | |
| (12) | Matthew Lydon | 10 February 1903 | 8 February 1904 | 363 days | |
| (11) | Jeremiah Robinson | 9 February 1904 | 9 February 1905 | 1 year, 0 days | |
| 15 | Stephen Powell | 10 February 1905 | 12 February 1906 | 1 year, 2 days | |
| (14) | William Court | 13 February 1906 | 4 February 1907 | 356 days | |
| 16 | Thomas Rutherford | 5 February 1907 | 6 February 1908 | 1 year, 1 day | |
| 17 | Theophilus Robin | 7 February 1908 | 7 February 1909 | 1 year, 0 days | |
| 18 | James Bullerwell | 8 February 1909 | 10 February 1910 | 1 year, 2 days | |
| 19 | John Gellately | 11 February 1910 | 2 February 1911 | 356 days | |
| 20 | William Angus | 3 February 1911 | 4 February 1912 | 1 year, 1 day | |
| 21 | Anthony Shaw | 5 February 1912 | 2 February 1913 | 363 days | |
| (17) | Theophilus Robin | 3 February 1913 | 7 February 1915 | 2 years, 4 days | |
| (13) | James Gray | 8 February 1915 | 8 February 1916 | 1 year, 0 days | |
| (17) | Theophilus Robin | 9 February 1916 | 5 February 1918 | 1 year, 361 days | |
| 22 | Allan Cameron | 6 February 1918 | 24 February 1920 | 2 years, 18 days | |
| 23 | Benjamin Saunders | 25 February 1920 | 21 December 1920 | 300 days | |
| 24 | Joshua Arthur | 22 December 1920 | 11 December 1923 | 2 years, 354 days | |
| 25 | James Cousins | 12 December 1923 | 9 December 1924 | 363 days | |
| 26 | Robert Coote | 10 December 1924 | 7 December 1926 | 1 year, 362 days | |
| 27 | Frank Moxey | 8 December 1926 | 4 December 1928 | 1 year, 362 days | |
| (25) | James Cousins | 7 December 1927 | 4 December 1928 | 363 days | |
| 28 | James Wiggins | 5 December 1928 | 3 December 1929 | 363 days | |
| 29 | David Lloyd | 4 December 1929 | 2 December 1930 | 363 days | |
| (22) | Allan Cameron | 3 December 1930 | 7 December 1931 | 1 year, 4 days | |
| 30 | John Williams | 8 December 1931 | 3 December 1932 | 361 days | |
| 31 | Albert Bartley | 4 December 1932 | 9 December 1934 | 2 years, 5 days | |
| (29) | David Lloyd | 11 December 1933 | 9 December 1934 | 363 days | |
| (22) | Allan Cameron | 10 December 1934 | 8 December 1936 | 1 year, 364 days | |
| 25 | James Cousins | 14 April 1936 | 8 December 1936 | 238 days | |
| 32 | William Warnock | 9 December 1936 | 1 April 1938 | 1 year, 113 days | |

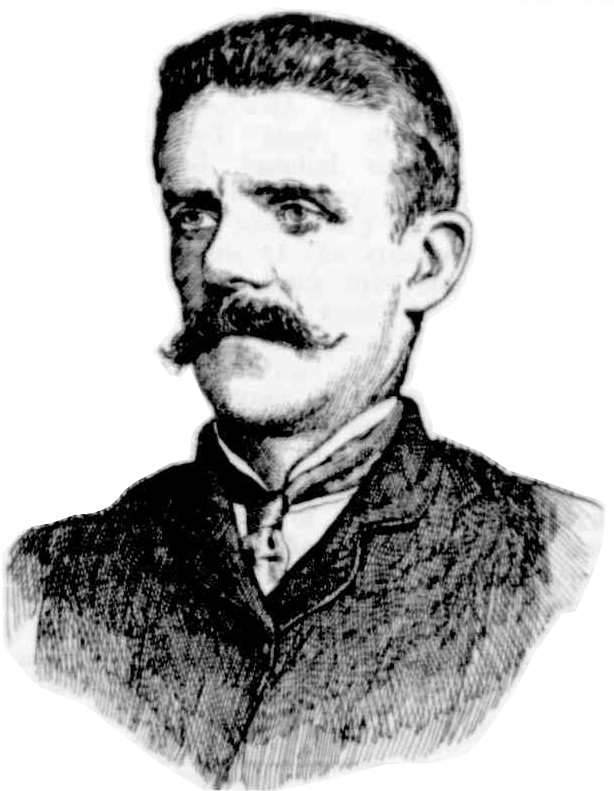
Alfred Edden, Mayor (1889-90, 1891)

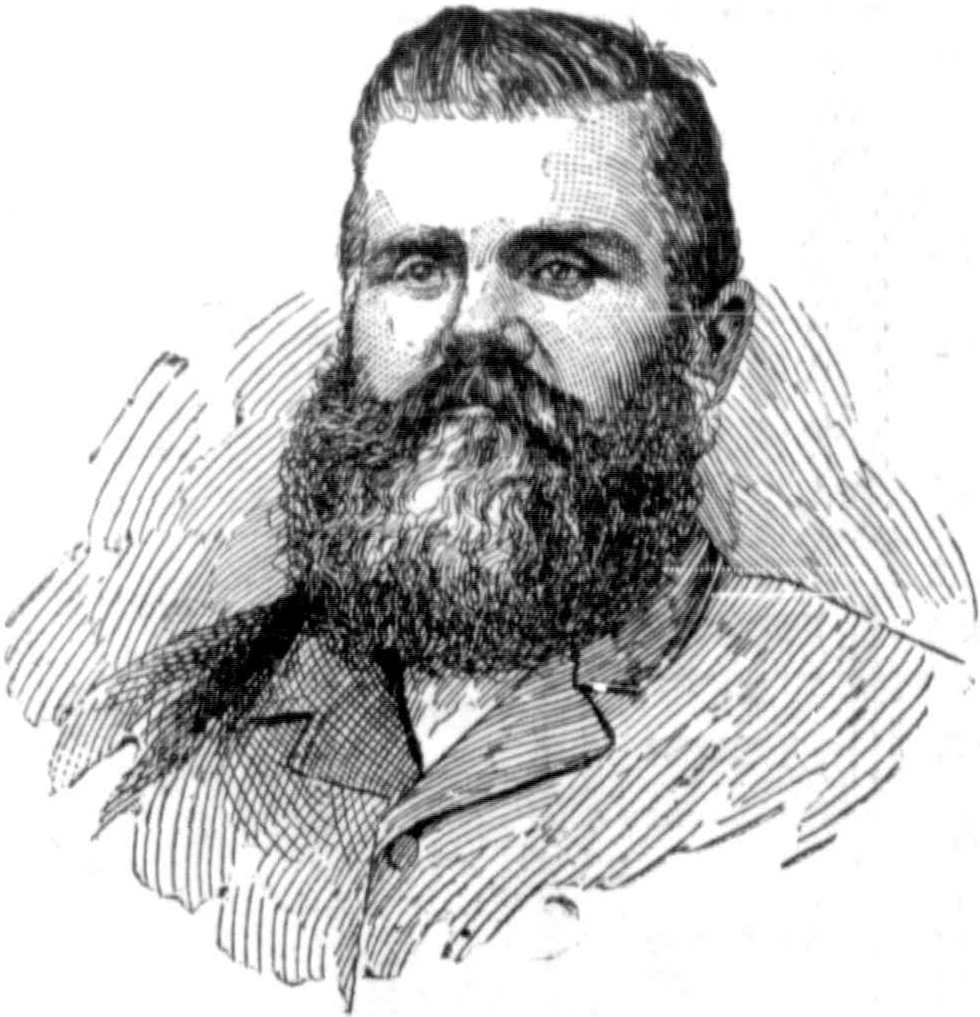
Thomas Hetherington, Mayor (1888-89)
