= Alfred Edden =

Australian politician (1850–1930)

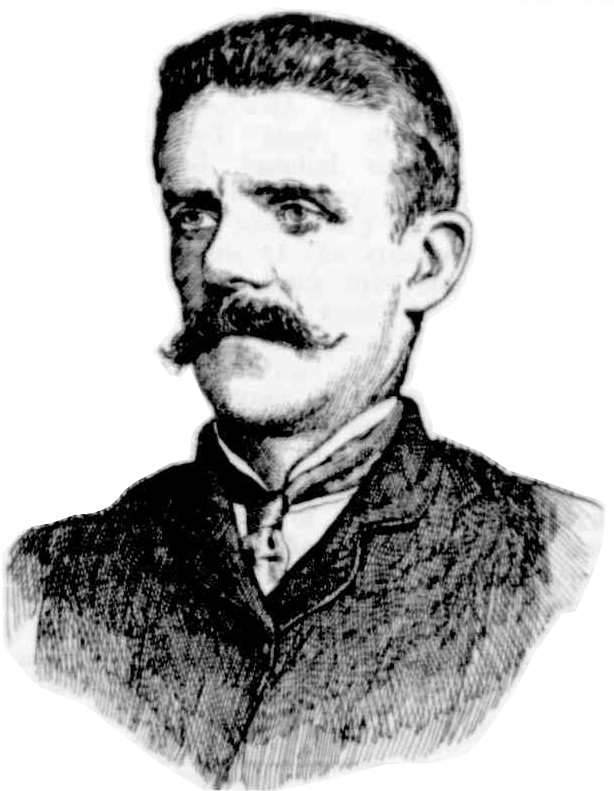
- Alfred Edden in 1889

Secretary for Mines
- In office 1910–1914

Personal details
- Born: 24 November 1850 Tamworth, England
- Died: 27 July 1930 (aged 79) Redfern, New South Wales
- Party: Labor Party Nationalist Party of Australia

Alfred Edden (24 November 1850 – 27 July 1930) was a politician, trade union organiser and coal miner in New South Wales, Australia. He was a member of the New South Wales Legislative Assembly for more than 28 years, including 3 as Secretary for Mines. He was a foundation member of the Labor Party but left the party twice, in 1891 over the question of the solidarity pledge and was expelled in 1916 over the question of conscription.

== Early life ==
Edden was born in Tamworth, England. He was the son of a coal-miner who died in a mining accident shortly before his birth. He had little education and worked as a coal miner from age 10. He migrated with his family to Australia in 1879 and worked in collieries in the Newcastle area. After 1879 Edden became an official of the coal miners union and was charged with unlawful assembly during an 1888 strike. He was elected as an alderman of Adamstown Municipal Council of which he was mayor in 1889 and 1891. Edden was a member of the Oddfellows, Masons and Single Tax League.

== State Politics ==
Edden was selected by the nascent Labor party as its candidate for the seat of Northumberland at the 1891 colonial election. He was one of 35 Labor party members elected to the parliament. However, together with 25 of his colleagues he left the party when he was required to sign a pledge to support all caucus decisions. At the 1894 colonial election he successfully contested the newly created seat of Kahibah as an Independent Labor candidate. He then rejoined the Labor party and became the deputy leader in 1902.

== Government ==
With the election of the New South Wales Labor Government of James McGowen in 1910 Edden was appointed the Secretary for Mines. He maintained this position in the first Holman ministry until 1914 when he was dropped from the ministry, after expressing his irritation with strikes. During the ALP split over conscription in World War I he supported William Holman and was expelled from the party. He joined William Holman's grand coalition, which coalesced into the Nationalist Party in 1917, but was not appointed to the second Holman ministry. He retired from parliament at the end of the term and did not contest the 1920 state election.

== Personal life ==
On 20 February 1871 Edden married Maria Brown in Nottinghamshire, England and they had 2 sons and 2 daughters. Maria died during child birth on 1 June 1887, and on 28 September 1887 he married Mary Ann George, née Langley, a widow. Mary died on 18 March 1929.

Edden died at Redfern on 27 July 1930 (aged 79), survived by 2 sons and a daughter from his first marriage and 2 sons and a daughter from his second. There is conflicting information as to the number of his children, with the Australian Dictionary of Biography stating he had 9 children, while his parliamentary biography states that he had 7.

== See also ==
- Members of the New South Wales Legislative Assembly
- 1891–1894
- 1894–1895
- 1895–1898
- 1898–1901
- 1901–1904
- 1904–1907
- 1907–1910
- 1910–1913
- 1913–1917
- 1917–1920
- Results of New South Wales state elections
- 1891 (Northumberland)
- 1894 (Kahibah)
- 1895 (Kahibah)
- 1898 (Kahibah)
- 1901 (Kahibah)
- 1904 (Kahibah)
- 1907 (Kahibah)
- 1910 (Kahibah)
- 1913 (Kahibah)
- 1917 (Kahibah)

New South Wales Legislative Assembly
| Preceded by Joseph Creer | Member for Northumberland; 1891 – 1894; Served alongside: Melville, Walker | Succeeded by Richard Stevenson |
| Preceded by New division | Member for Kahibah; 1894 – 1920 | Succeeded by Hugh Connell |
Political offices
| Preceded by William Wood | Secretary for Mines; 1910 – 1914 | Succeeded by John Cann |
Civic offices
| Preceded by Thomas Hetherington | Mayor of Adamstown; February 1889 – February 1890 | Succeeded by Thomas Frith |
| Preceded by Thomas Frith | Mayor of Adamstown; February – July 1891 | Succeeded by John Sheedy |
