= William Turner (Australian politician) =

Politician and miner in New South Wales, Australia

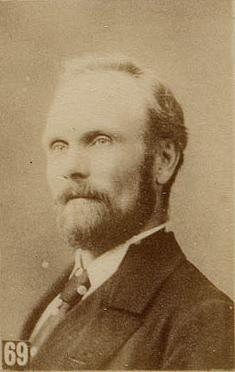

William Turner (1837 – 24 April 1916) was an English-born politician and miner in Victoria and New South Wales, Australia.

== Early life ==
Turner was born in Wickham in Durham to bootmaker William Turner and Ann née White. His date of birth is uncertain: his biographies list him as born in 1837, which would make him aged 78–79 at his death, while the notice of his death lists his age as 82, which would mean he was born in 1833 or 1834. He migrated to Victoria in 1857 and worked on the goldfields. On 15 February 1861 he married Margaret Elliott, with whom he had five children. He became a temperance lecturer and Methodist preacher in the Ballarat and Scarsdale districts.

== Politics ==
He ran for the Victorian Legislative Assembly in 1871, contesting the district of Grenville but was narrowly defeated for the second seat by 13 votes (0.2%).

Around 1873 moved to Wallsend where he was a foreman at one of the coal mines. He was elected to the New South Wales Legislative Assembly for Northumberland at the by-election in July 1877, comfortably defeating Thomas Hungerford with a margin of 1,077 votes (44.2%). Members of parliament were unpaid at the time and Turner was supported by the local miners under the banner of the political reform league with funds raised by a subscription, said to be £0.08 per person. He was considered to be the first direct representative of labour to sit in the Legislative Assembly. He was defeated by Hungerford at the general election in October 1877, with a margin of 46 votes (1.4%). Northumberland was expanded to two members in 1880 and Turner defeated Hungerford to win the second seat with a margin of 425 votes (8.0%). He resigned from parliament in 1881. Turner stated that he was unable to support himself as a member of parliament. His obituaries stated that the miners had failed to renew their subscriptions, while the Australian Dictionary of Biography states that Turner denied that the financial support of the miners had been promised before the 1880 election.

He stood a final time as the Protectionist Party candidate at the 1889 election for The Hunter, but was defeated with a margin of 72 votes (6.4%).

== Later life and death ==
From 1882 to 1887 he was a school attendance officer, and he then worked as a florist and horticulturist at Belmore. Turner retired in 1903 and moved to Hurstville where he died in 1916. He was survived by his wife Margaret, two daughters and three sons.

New South Wales Legislative Assembly
Preceded by Charles Stevens	Member for Northumberland; 1877	Succeeded by Thomas Hungerford
Preceded by Ninian Melville	Member for Northumberland; 1880–1881; With: Ninian Melville	Succeeded by Thomas Hungerford
