= Richard Luscombe =

Australian politician

Richard Charles Luscombe was an Australian politician.

He was a master builder and insurance agent, and co-founded the Protection and Political Reform League with Ninian Melville in 1881. He was elected to the New South Wales Legislative Assembly for Northumberland in 1884, but was defeated in 1885.

New South Wales Legislative Assembly
Preceded by Atkinson Tighe	Member for Northumberland; 1884–1885; Served alongside: Ninian Melville	Succeeded by Joseph Creer
