= Ninian Melville =

Australian politician (1843–1897)

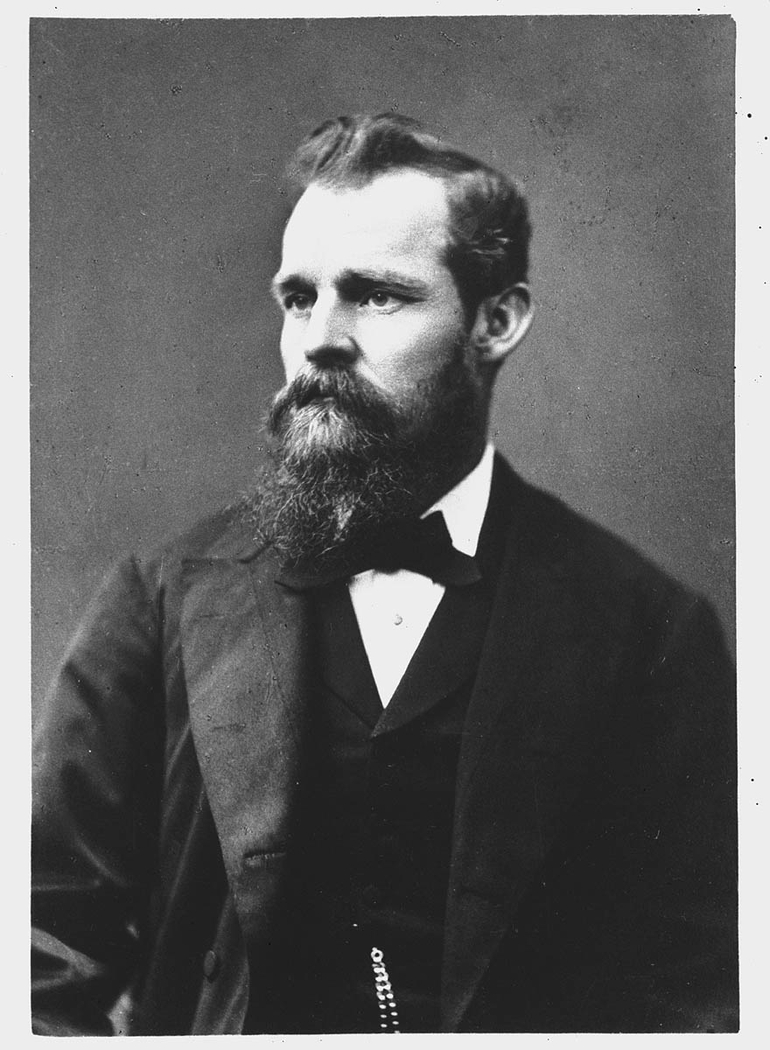
Ninian Melville

Ninian Melville (29 December 1843 – 26 June 1897) was an Australian politician in the late nineteenth century.

== Early life ==
The son of a Scottish cabinet maker (Ninian Melville Jnr) who had been transported to Australia for stealing clothes, Melville was born in Sydney and followed his father into the furniture making business. Unfortunately, the business collapsed in 1866 under pressure from foreign imports and Melville began organising the unemployed to protest and demand protection for the industry.

== Politics ==
He moved to Melbourne the following year where he put his carpentry skills to use with an undertaker and also unsuccessfully contested a seat in the Victorian Parliament. He returned to Sydney in 1874 and, campaigning on a protectionist platform, he eventually won the seat of Northumberland in the New South Wales Legislative Assembly at the 1880 by-election which he held until 1894. He was elected Chairman of Committees in 1886 but never served as a minister. His period in office was colourful including an unproven allegation of bribery and being described by the premier Sir Henry Parkes as the "veriest charlatan that ever lived" and by poet Henry Kendall in The Song of Ninian Melville as "that immense imposter".

Melville was also active in local politics spending time on Newtown Council, where he was elected mayor in 1882, and Ashfield Council, where he was elected mayor in 1896.

== Death ==
When he died in his Summer Hill home in 1897, he was survived by his wife Mary, two sons and two daughters.

== Notes ==
New South Wales Legislative Assembly
Preceded by Thomas Hungerford	Member for Northumberland; April – November 1880; With: none	
	1880 – 1887; With: Turner / Hungerford / Tighe / Luscombe / Creer	
	1887 – 1894; With: Joseph Creer / Alfred Edden; Thomas Walker	Succeeded by Richard Stevenson
Civic offices
Preceded by Charles Whately	Mayor of Newtown; 1882 – 1883	Succeeded by Charles Boots
Preceded by John Upward	Mayor of Ashfield; 1895	Succeeded by Richard Stanton
