= Joseph Creer =

Politician, mayor and cabinet maker in New South Wales, Australia

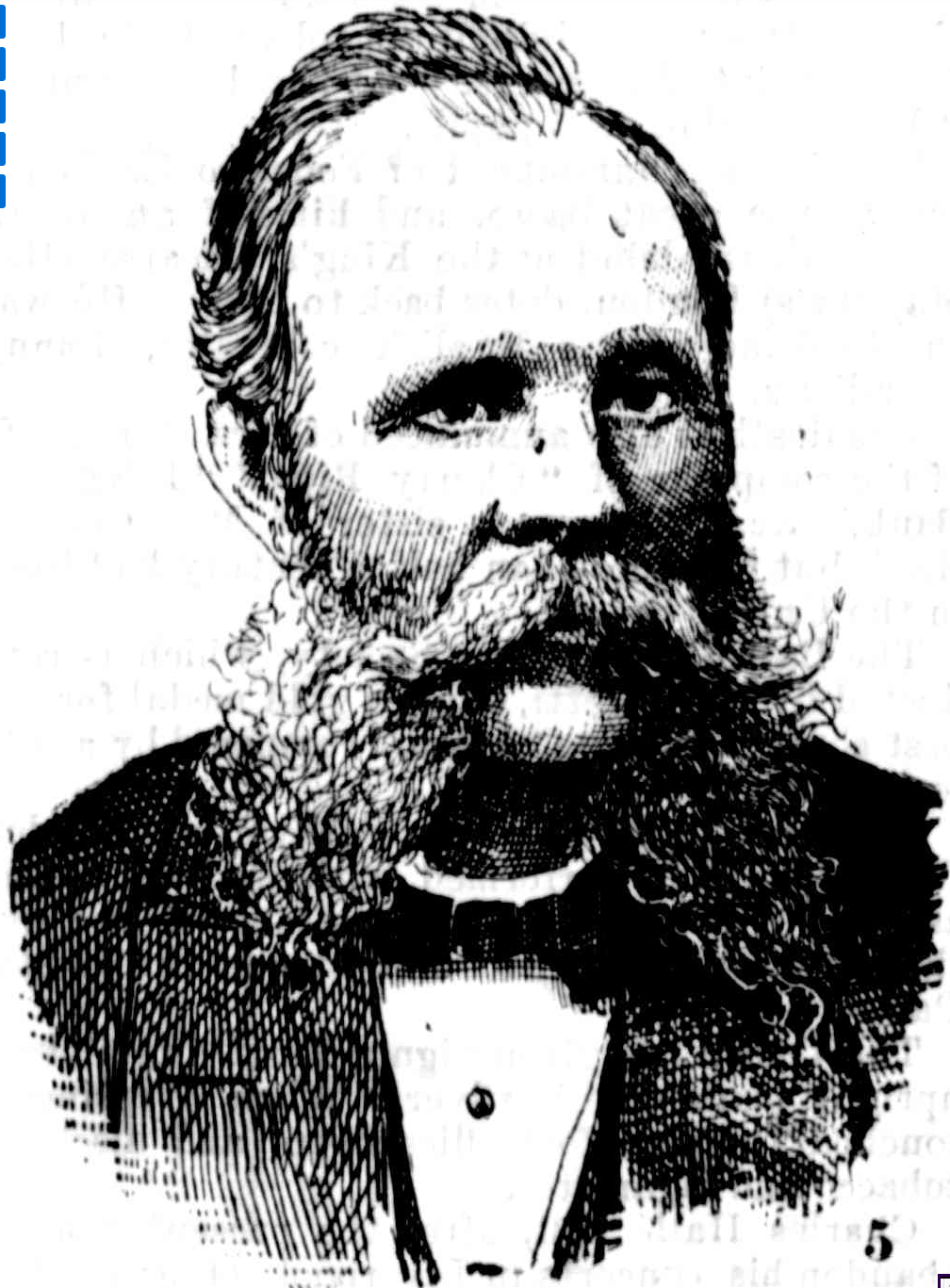
Mr Joseph Creer MLA

Joseph Creer (1 February 1832 – 17 August 1913) was a Manx-born Australian politician and cabinetmaker.

== Early life ==
He was born on the Isle of Man to farmer Patrick Creer and Ann Quirk. He married Annie Harrison at Liverpool in 1854; they had nine children. In 1855 he migrated to New South Wales, settling in Maitland, where he worked as a builder and broom manufacturer. He left Maitland due to flooding and moved to Newcastle in 1870, working as a cabinet maker, until his business was destroyed by fire. He then established a successful business as an auctioneer. He was a prominent member of the temperance movement in Newcastle, and was appointed a magistrate in 1880.

== Civic and political career ==
In 1867 he was elected an alderman of the Borough of West Maitland. He was defeated in February 1869, but re-elected to a casual vacancy in April 1869. He was first elected an alderman for Newcastle in 1875, serving until 1887, including as Mayor of Newcastle in 1881. In 1885 he was elected to the New South Wales Legislative Assembly as one of the members for Northumberland on a protectionist platform. An independent protectionist when political parties emerged in 1887, he joined the Protectionist Party in 1889 and held his seat until his defeat in 1891. He did not hold any ministerial or parliamentary office.

== Later life and death ==
Creer was appointed superintendent of the government labour bureau in 1892, holding the position for ten years until 1901 when he was appointed a Labour Commissioner, before retiring in 1902 when he went on a trip to Europe and North America. He moved to Summer Hill on his return, where he died in 1913 (aged 82).

New South Wales Legislative Assembly
Preceded by Richard Luscombe	Member for Northumberland; 1885 – 1891; With: Ninian Melville none/Thomas Walker	Succeeded by Ninian Melville; Thomas Walker; Alfred Edden
Civic offices
Preceded by Samuel Chapman	Mayor of Newcastle; 1881	Succeeded by Thomas Brooks
