= Henry Wheeler (politician) =

Australian politician

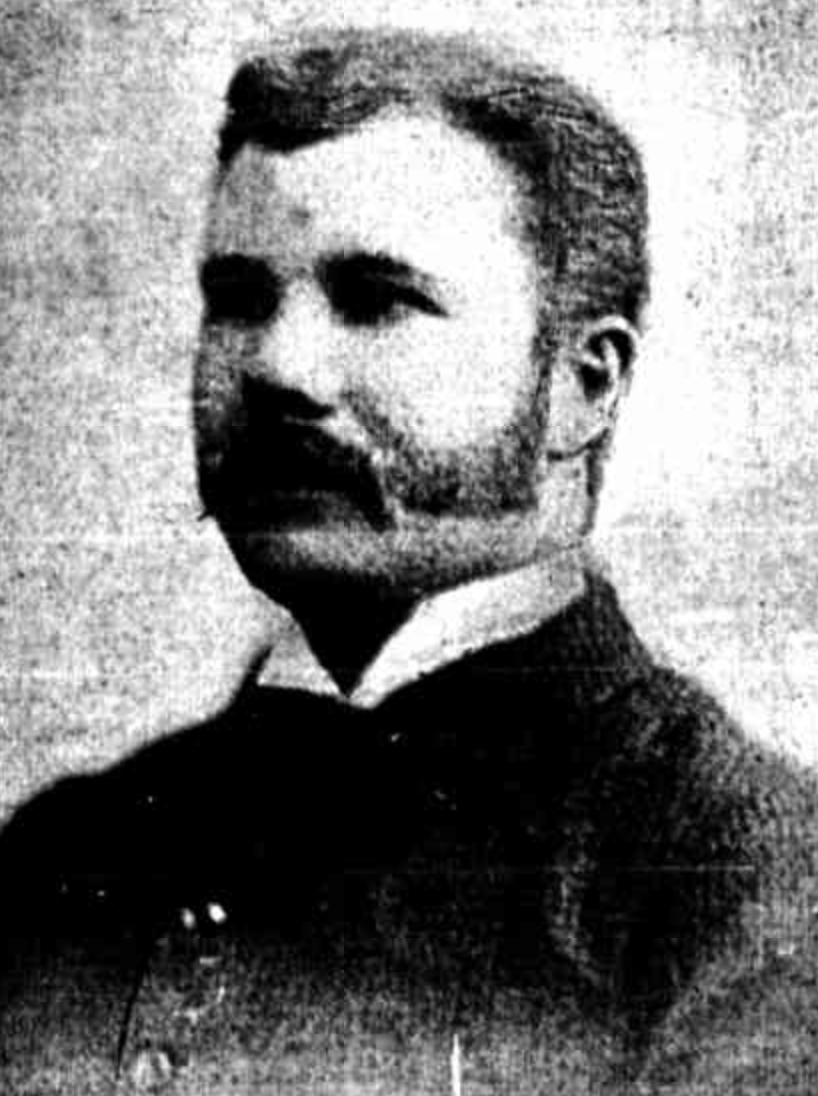
Wheeler in 1888

Henry Charles Wheeler (10 November 1861 – 1 April 1935) was an Australian politician.

He was born at St Albans to schoolmaster William Wheeler and Eliza Martha. He served as the mayor of Gosford in 1888. From 1895 to 1898 he was the Free Trade member for Northumberland in the New South Wales Legislative Assembly. An Anglican bachelor, he died at Paddington in 1935, at which time he was a sharebroker.

New South Wales Legislative Assembly
Preceded by Richard Stevenson	Member for Northumberland; 1895–1898	Succeeded by Richard Stevenson
