= Atkinson Tighe =

Butcher, politician and police magistrate in New South Wales, Australia

Atkinson Alfred Patrick Tighe (3 March 1827 – 13 June 1905) was an Australian politician, butcher and police magistrate.

He was born at sea near Corfu to Sergeant Robert Tighe of the 17th Regiment. He arrived in New South Wales around 1830, and by 1840 his father was chief constable and a publican at Newcastle. The younger Tighe established a slaughterhouse, and on 14 July 1859 married Arabella Vine, with whom he had seven children. A Newcastle alderman from 1859 to 1862 and from 1871 to 1873, he served as mayor from 1872 to 1873.

In 1862 he was elected to the New South Wales Legislative Assembly for Northumberland, serving until 1869. During this period he served for a month (September – October 1868) as Postmaster-General. In 1873 he was appointed local coroner at Newcastle, and he was a police magistrate from 1874 to 1878. He returned to the Assembly in 1882 but resigned due to ill health in 1884.

Tighe died at Glebe Point on 13 June 1905 (aged 78).

Parliament of New South Wales
Political offices
Preceded by Joseph Docker	Postmaster-General; Sep – Oct 1868	Succeeded by Daniel Egan
New South Wales Legislative Assembly
Preceded by Thomas Lewis	Member for Northumberland; 1862 – 1869	Succeeded by William Brookes
Preceded by Thomas Hungerford	Member for Northumberland; 1882 – 1884; Served alongside: Ninian Melville	Succeeded by Richard Luscombe
Civic offices
Preceded by James Hannell	Mayor of Newcastle; 1872 – 1873	Succeeded by E. A. White
