= Charles Stevens (Australian politician) =

English-born Australian politician

Charles James Stevens (1823 – 18 November 1883) was an English-born Australian politician.

He was born in Kent, the son of an Anglican clergyman. He migrated to New South Wales around 1863 and worked as a mine manager at Newcastle. In 1874 he was elected to the New South Wales Legislative Assembly for Northumberland. He left the colony on an expedition to recover valuable property, including 2,576 ounces of gold, from the General Grant, which wrecked off Auckland Island in 1866. As he hadn't returned, in June 1877 he was declared insolvent, and his seat in parliament was declared vacant.

Stevens died at Newcastle in 1883 (aged 60).

New South Wales Legislative Assembly
Preceded by James Hannell	Member for Northumberland; 1874–1877	Succeeded by William Turner
