= James Hannell =

Australian politician (1813–1876)

- Born: 1 December 1813; Parramatta, New South Wales, Australia
- Died: 31 December 1876 (aged 63); Maryville, New South Wales, Australia
- Other name: James Walton
- Occupations: Police Constable, auctioneer, publican, politician
- Spouse: Mary Anne Sophia Priest (1819–1884)
- Children: 11

James Hannell (1 December 1813 – 31 December 1876) was an auctioneer, publican, and Australian politician elected as a member of the New South Wales Legislative Assembly, the first mayor of Newcastle, and the first mayor of Wickham.

== Early life ==
Hannell, was free-born in Parramatta, New South Wales, Australia, on 1 December 1813. He was the eldest son of two convicts. His mother Elizabeth Hannell arrived in Sydney in 1812 from Middlesex, England (Convict – 7 years). His father James Walton of Lancashire, England, a private of the Coldstream Guards. Hannell was registered with NSW Births, Deaths and Marriages Register with his father's family name 'Walton,' as were his brothers John (b. 27 August 1815) and Jesse (b. 15 November 1817); however, in life they used their mother's maiden name.

Hannell was baptised on 13 May 1814 at St. John's Church, Parramatta.

Hannell's mother was incarcerated in the Parramatta Female Factory. She was involved with other convicts (James Garland and James Stubbs) in a scam to obtain money from forged receipts and was convicted and sentenced in June 1820 to 'Life' in Newcastle. She was transported to Newcastle on the ship Princess Charlotte and arrived on 27 July 1820. She had a daughter, Mary Ann (b. 10 May 1821), with a convict called John White (died November 1828). Elizabeth was granted permission to wed the district constable, and ticket of leave man, John Butler Hewson, on 28 May 1828. Hewson became the foster father of the children, including Hannell, when they joined their mother in Newcastle.

Hannell was educated at Christ Church School, Newcastle.

On 12 March 1836, Hannell married Mary Ann Sophia (b. 1819, Sydney), second daughter of Edward Priest (a former convict who arrived in Newcastle in 1817). Hannell and Mary had eleven children: Clarence Hewson, Stephena Mary, Emily Frances, Fanny Anne, James Edward, Mary Elizabeth, Florence Jane, Constance Myra, Arthur Hubert, James Edward (d. 1842), and John Henry (d. 1860).

The area known as Smedmore, where the Hannell home was situated, became known as Maryville, in honour of Hannell's wife, Mary. The main street of Wickham is Hannell Street.

== Career ==
Hannell was a police constable from 1833 to 1836. He became Newcastle's first licensed auctioneer in September 1839. He bought a licensed public house called the 'Ship Inn' on the corner of Hunter and Bolton Street, Newcastle.

Hannell's brother, John Hannell, became the licensee of the Wheat Sheaf Inn at Hexham, near Newcastle. He was a sportsman, and pilot of ships on the Hunter River. When the punt service was opened, around 1862, John was appointed to run it. Another of Hannell's brothers, Jesse Hannell, became Signal Master and the first lighthouse keeper at Nobbys Head Lighthouse.

In 1857, Hannell was gazetted as a justice of the peace and attended the Newcastle bench. Hannell was a churchwarden and trustee of Christ Church Cathedral. Hannell was involved in the incorporation of Newcastle and became its first mayor in 1859–62, serving again in 1868–69 and 1871. He was mayor in 1868 when the Duke of Edinburgh visited on 5 March. In 1859–64, 1866–71 and 1873–76 he represented city ward in the Newcastle Council. Hannell became Mayor of Wickham when it became a municipality in 1871. He served alongside Peter Fleming, Charles Thomas, James Harrison Hubbard, Charles Upfold, and William Henry White.

Hannell became Newcastle's member of the New South Wales Legislative Assembly. He represented the City Ward in 1860, and was re-elected in 1864. He contested and won the Northumberland vote and was returned to Parliament.

Hannell organised concerts for the Newcastle Hospital, in which he took part as a comic singer. When the new hospital 'Wing' was completed it was named the 'Hannell Wing' in honour of Hannell and his son Clarence.

Hannell was president and judge of the Newcastle Jockey Club. He organised the first regatta and was president of the Newcastle Regatta Committee for thirty years. He was president of the Newcastle Cricket Club. He helped establish the Newcastle Mechanics' School of Arts. In 1858 was a trustee of the Newcastle National School. In 1867 he became a member of the board of the Newcastle Public School.

== Death ==
Hannell died from pneumonia, on 31 December 1876, and was interred at the burial ground of Christ Church Cathedral. His tombstone is still in the grounds, just outside the Warriors' Chapel.

Hannell was survived by Mary and nine of their eleven children:
1) Clarence Hewson, b. 15 October 1836 (BDM V18361179 20/1836) – d. 3 April 1909 (BDM 2528/1909) – m. Maria Phoebe TIGHE,
2) Stephena Mary, b. 2 June 1838 (BDM V18381282 22/1838) – d. Sep. 1927 (BDM 12068/1927) – m. Henry ROUSE,
3) James Edward*, b. 30 June 1840 (BDM V18401483 24A/1840) – d. 3 December 1842 (BDM V18421155 26B/1842),
4) Emily Frances, b. 25 December 1841 (BDM V18411572 26A/1841) – d. 7 May 1906 (BDM 9634/1906) – m. Thomas Albert CLACK,
5) Fanny Anne, b. 27 January 1844 – d. 29 October 1910 (BDM 14480/1910) – m. Joseph WOOD,
6) James Edward, b. 15 November 1847 (BDM V18472158 32A/1847) – d. 2 March 1903 (BDM 2481/1903) – m. Jane Danson RUSH,
7) Mary Elizabeth, b. 6 October 1850 (BDM V18502927 35/1850) – d. 30 April 1884 (Unsure) – m. Edwin Alfred MITCHELL,
8) Florence Jane, b. 9 December 1853 (BDM V18551671 42A/1855) – d. 16 June 1931 (BDM 8321/1931) – m. John Aloysius CRAVEN,
9) Constance Myra, b. 11 October 1857 (BDM 9291/1857) – d. 8 November 1928 (BDM 17776/1928) – m. Rev. William Jenton JAMES,
10) John Henry*, b. 28 August 1858 (BDM 10433/1859) – d. 19 April 1860 (BDM 4955/1860),
11) Arthur Hubert, b. 13 January 1862 (BDM 10868/1862) – d. 30 December 1938 (BDM 23685/1938) – m. Sarah Jane BRIGGS,

* Denotes infant death.

James Hannell's estate was valued at under £1000.

== Notes ==
Statistics from the NSW Birth Deaths and Marriages.

New South Wales Legislative Assembly
Preceded by Arthur Hodgson	Member for Newcastle; 1860–1869	Succeeded by George Lloyd
Preceded by William Brookes	Member for Northumberland; 1872–1874	Succeeded by Charles Stevens
