= Richard Stevenson (Australian politician) =

Politician from New South Wales, Australia

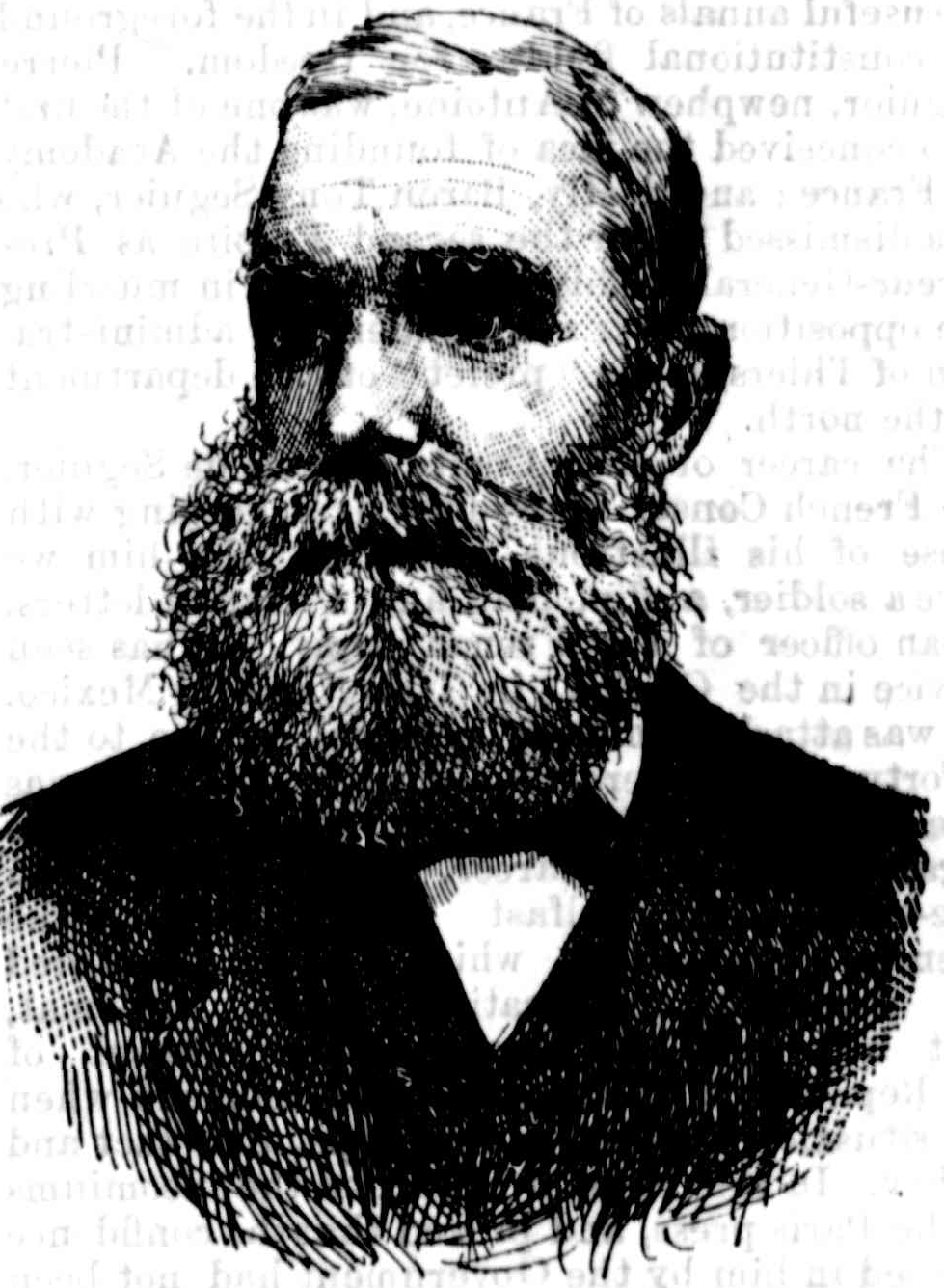

Richard Stevenson (1832 – 14 May 1899) was an English-born Australian politician.

== Early life ==
He was born at Egham in Surrey, and after working in a printing house arrived in New South Wales in 1851, where he joined the Sydney Morning Herald, working there until 1857 when he left to work on the goldfields at Hanging Rock and Rocky River. 18 months later he returned to Herald, leaving again in 1861 when he purchased the Clarence and Richmond Examiner and New England Advertiser for £600. On 8 October 1862 he married Louise Whitehouse at Grafton, they had no children. He published the paper until 1875 when he sold it for £3,000 due to ill health.

== Political career ==
Stevenson stood unsuccessfully for Grafton at the 1880 election and The Clarence at the 1882 and 1885 elections. He was elected to the New South Wales Legislative Assembly as the member for Wollombi at the by-election in 1886. With the emergence of political parties in 1887, he joined the Free Trade Party, but changed to the Protectionist Party in 1889. Wollombi was abolished in 1894 and he successfully contested Northumberland. He was defeated in 1895 but elected again in 1898.

Stevenson died at Putty on 14 May 1899 (aged 66–67).

New South Wales Legislative Assembly
Preceded by Lyall Scott	Member for Wollombi; 1886–1894	Abolished
Preceded by Alfred Edden; Ninian Melville; Thomas Walker	Member for Northumberland; 1894–1895	Succeeded by Henry Wheeler
Preceded by Henry Wheeler	Member for Northumberland; 1898–1899	Succeeded by John Norton
