= Electoral district of Northumberland =

Former state electoral district of New South Wales, Australia

Northumberland was an electoral district for the Legislative Assembly in the Australian state of New South Wales from 1859 to 1913, in the Newcastle area and named after Northumberland County. It elected two members simultaneously between 1880 and 1887 and three members between 1887 and 1894. Voters cast a vote for each vacancy and the leading candidates were elected.

== Members for Northumberland ==
Single-member (1859–1880)
Member	Party	Term						
Alexander Scott	None	1859–1860						
Thomas Lewis	None	1860–1862						
Atkinson Tighe	None	1862–1869						
William Brookes	None	1869–1872						
James Hannell	None	1872–1874						
Charles Stevens	None	1874–1877						
William Turner	None	1877–1877						
Thomas Hungerford	None	1877–1880						
Ninian Melville	None	1880–1880						
Two members (1880–1887)
Member	Party	Term	Member	Party	Term			
Ninian Melville	None	1880–1887	William Turner	None	1880–1881			
Ninian Melville	None	1880–1887	Thomas Hungerford	None	1882–1882			
Ninian Melville	None	1880–1887	Atkinson Tighe	None	1882–1884			
Ninian Melville	None	1880–1887	Richard Luscombe	None	1884–1885			
Ninian Melville	None	1880–1887	Joseph Creer	None	1885–1887			
Three members (1887–1894)
Member	Party	Term	Member	Party	Term	Member	Party	Term
Ninian Melville	Protectionist	1887–1894	Joseph Creer	Ind. Protectionist	1887–1889	Thomas Walker	Protectionist	1887–1894
Ninian Melville	Protectionist	1887–1894	Joseph Creer	Protectionist	1889–1891	Thomas Walker	Protectionist	1887–1894
Ninian Melville	Protectionist	1887–1894	Alfred Edden	Labour	1891–1894	Thomas Walker	Protectionist	1887–1894
Single-member (1894–1913)
Member	Party	Term						
Richard Stevenson	Protectionist	1894–1895						
Henry Wheeler	Free Trade	1895–1898						
Richard Stevenson	Protectionist	1898–1899						
John Norton	Ind. Protectionist	1899–1904						
Matthew Charlton	Labour	1904–1910						
William Kearsley	Labour	1910–1913						

== Election results ==
1910 New South Wales state election: Northumberland
Party	Candidate	Votes	%	±%
Labour	William Kearsley	7,389	79.1	
Independent Liberal	Reginald Harris	1,957	20.9	
Total formal votes		9,346	97.6	
Informal votes		228	2.4	
Turnout		9,574	56.9	
Labour hold				
