= Electoral results for the district of Morpeth =

Election results for state seat of Morpeth, New South Wales, Australia

Morpeth, an electoral district of the Legislative Assembly in the Australian state of New South Wales was created in 1859 and abolished in 1894.

Election	Member	Party
1859	Edward Close	None
1860 by	Samuel Cohen	None
1860	David Buchanan	None
1862 by	Edward Close	None
1864	James Campbell	None
1869	James Campbell	None
1872	James Campbell	None
1874	Robert Wisdom	None
1877	Robert Wisdom	None
1880	Robert Wisdom	None
1882	Robert Wisdom	None
1885	Robert Wisdom	None
1887	John Bowes	Protectionist
1889	Myles McRae	Protectionist
1891	John Bowes	Protectionist

== Election results ==
=== Elections in the 1890s ===
==== 1891 ====
1891 New South Wales colonial election: Morpeth Wednesday 17 June
Party	Candidate	Votes	%	±%
Protectionist	John Bowes (elected)	509	53.6	
Free Trade	William Arnold	357	37.6	
Protectionist	John Courtney	50	5.3	
Free Trade	Malcolm Martin	33	3.5	
Total formal votes		949	98.4	
Informal votes		15	1.6	
Turnout		964	75.4	
Protectionist hold				

=== Elections in the 1880s ===
==== 1889 ====
1889 New South Wales colonial election: Morpeth Saturday 9 February
Party	Candidate	Votes	%	±%
Protectionist	Myles McRae (elected)	375	37.5	
Protectionist	John Bowes	356	35.6	
Free Trade	John Clarke	270	27.0	
Total formal votes		1,001	98.8	
Informal votes		12	1.2	
Turnout		1,013	77.2	
Protectionist hold				

==== 1887 ====
1887 New South Wales colonial election: Morpeth Wednesday 16 February
Party	Candidate	Votes	%	±%
Protectionist	John Bowes (elected)	541	58.2	
Free Trade	Myles McRae	388	41.8	
Total formal votes		929	98.7	
Informal votes		12	1.3	
Turnout		941	75.3	

==== 1885 ====
1885 New South Wales colonial election: Morpeth Thursday 22 October
Candidate	Votes	%
Robert Wisdom (re-elected)	536	56.7
Robert Pierce	409	43.3
Total formal votes	945	99.8
Informal votes	2	0.2
Turnout	947	79.7

==== 1882 ====
1882 New South Wales colonial election: Morpeth Wednesday 13 December
Candidate	Votes	%
Robert Wisdom (re-elected)	554	62.9
Archibald Jacob (defeated)	327	37.1
Total formal votes	881	97.5
Informal votes	23	2.5
Turnout	904	77.8

Archibald Jacob was the sitting member for Gloucester.

==== 1880 ====
1880 New South Wales colonial election: Morpeth Thursday 18 November
Candidate	Votes	%
Robert Wisdom (re-elected)	unopposed	

=== Elections in the 1870s ===
==== 1877 ====
1877 New South Wales colonial election: Morpeth Monday 29 October
Candidate	Votes	%
Robert Wisdom (re-elected)	unopposed	

==== 1874 ====
1874–75 New South Wales colonial election: Morpeth Thursday 17 December 1874
Candidate	Votes	%
Robert Wisdom (elected)	300	56.9
Pierce O'Keeffe	177	33.6
Myles McRae	50	9.5
William Bellamy	0	0.0
Total formal votes	527	95.6
Informal votes	24	4.4
Turnout	551	71.7

==== 1872 ====
1872 New South Wales colonial election: Morpeth Tuesday 20 February
Candidate	Votes	%
James Campbell (re-elected)	309	66.7
John Keating	144	31.1
J D Nelson	10	2.2
Total formal votes	463	89.6
Informal votes	54	10.4
Turnout	517	65.2

=== Elections in the 1860s ===
==== 1869 ====
1869–70 New South Wales colonial election: Morpeth Friday 17 December 1869
Candidate	Votes	%
James Campbell (re-elected)	397	65.3
John Keating	211	34.7
Total formal votes	608	97.6
Informal votes	15	2.4
Turnout	623	75.9

==== 1864 ====
1864–65 New South Wales colonial election: Morpeth Tuesday 13 December 1864
Candidate	Votes	%
James Campbell (elected)	315	59.8
John Keating	212	40.2
Total formal votes	527	100.0
Informal votes	0	0.0
Turnout	527	61.1

==== 1862 by-election ====
1862 Morpeth by-election Thursday 18 September
Candidate	Votes	%
Edward Close (elected)	330	68.5
David Buchanan (defeated)	152	31.5
Total formal votes	482	100.0
Informal votes	0	0.0
Turnout	482	61.5

David Buchanan was insolvent and resigned.

==== 1860 ====
1860 New South Wales colonial election: Morpeth Friday 14 December
Candidate	Votes	%
David Buchanan (elected)	285	54.4
Samuel Cohen (defeated)	239	45.6
Total formal votes	524	100.0
Informal votes	0	0.0
Turnout	524	64.8

==== 1860 by-election ====
1860 Morpeth by-election Tuesday 7 August
Candidate	Votes	%
Samuel Cohen (elected)	312	59.8
David Buchanan	210	40.2
Total formal votes	522	100.0
Informal votes	0	0.0
Turnout	522	64.5

Edward Close resigned.

=== Elections in the 1850s ===
==== 1859 ====
1859 New South Wales colonial election: Morpeth Friday 24 June
Candidate	Votes	%
Edward Close (elected)	280	54.8
Samuel Gordon	231	45.2
Total formal votes	231	100.0
Informal votes	511	0.0
Turnout	511	68.2
