= 1862 Morpeth colonial by-election =

By-election in New South Wales, Australia

A by-election was held for the New South Wales Legislative Assembly electorate of Morpeth on 18 September 1862 because David Buchanan was insolvent and resigned his seat. Buchanan had unsuccessfully sued the Sydney Morning Herald for libel and was required to pay their legal costs. He was unable to pay and declared himself bankrupt and resigned from parliament. Buchanan re-contested the seat at the resulting by-election but was defeated, with Edward Close Jr. being elected from that electoral district.

== Dates ==
Date	Event
2 September 1862	David Buchanan resigned.
2 September 1862	Writ of election issued by the Speaker of the Legislative Assembly.
16 September 1862	Nominations at Morpeth.
18 September 1862	Polling day between 9 am and 4 pm.
25 September 1862	Return of writ

== Polling places ==
- Morpeth
- Hinton
- Largs
- Clifden

== Result ==
1862 Morpeth by-election Thursday 18 September
Candidate	Votes	%
Edward Close (elected)	330	68.5
David Buchanan (defeated)	152	31.5
Total formal votes	482	100.0
Informal votes	0	0.0
Turnout	482	61.5

== See also ==
- Electoral results for the district of Morpeth
- List of New South Wales state by-elections
