= Maitland Lodge of Unity Masonic Hall and Lodge =

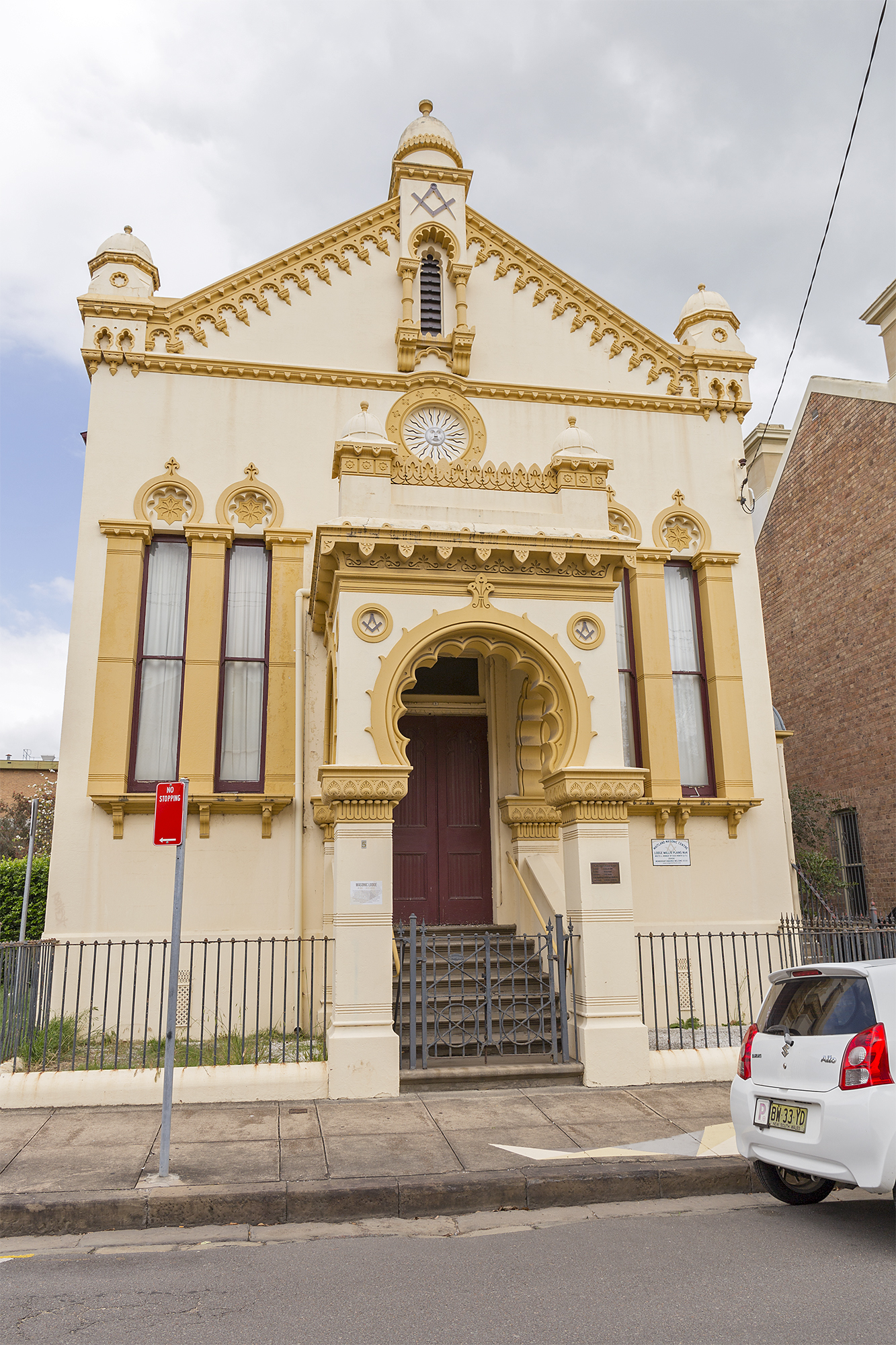

- Location within New South Wales Location within Australia
- 32.7370°S 151.5596°E
- Location: 5 Victoria Street, Maitland, City of Maitland, New South Wales, Australia

History
- Built: 1886–1927

Site notes
- Architect: J. W. Pender
- Owner: Maitland Lodge of Unity

New South Wales Heritage Register
- Official name: Maitland Lodge of Unity Masonic Hall and Lodge
- Type: state heritage (built)
- Designated: 19 December 2014
- Reference no.: 1937
- Type: Hall Masonic
- Category: Community Facilities

Maitland Lodge of Unity Masonic Hall and Lodge is a heritage-listed masonic lodge and masonic hall at 5 Victoria Street, Maitland, City of Maitland, New South Wales, Australia. It was designed by J. W. Pender and built from 1886 to 1927. The property is owned by Maitland Lodge of Unity. It was added to the New South Wales State Heritage Register on 19 December 2014.

== History ==
As the colony of New South Wales expanded outside of Sydney in the early 19th century, Europeans soon discovered the fertile lands of the Hunter Valley region and established a colonial outpost.

With its rich alluvial lands, the township of Maitland (then called Wallis Plains) was settled soon after and its strategic position on the Hunter River, which could provide steamship transport from the region to Sydney in less than twelve hours, was the key to its success and development. Maitland quickly became an important agricultural provider for the colony and, by the 1840s, its booming commercial sector saw its population expand exponentially, exceeded only by that of Sydney itself.

Much of the new population of Maitland were English settlers tasked with establishing an economically and socially viable community in the new and largely foreign environment. In an effort to maintain the traditions and familiarities of the British motherland, the colonists continued to pursue those activities and institutions from home and with this came freemasonry.

Warranted under one of the three Grand Lodges of the British Isles (being England, Ireland and Scotland), freemasonry was first established in Sydney in 1820 with the formation of the Australian Social Lodge under the Grand Lodge of Ireland. This lodge was later followed by the establishment of the Leinster Marine Lodge of Australia (also established under the Grand Lodge of Ireland in 1824), the Lodge of Australia (established under the Grand Lodge of England in 1828) and St Johns Lodge of Parramatta (an unaffiliated lodge, established in 1839).

The fifth lodge established in NSW, and the first to be formed outside of the Sydney colony, was the Maitland Lodge of Unity.

Upon the closure of St Johns Lodge of Parramatta (date unknown), the Maitland Lodge of Unity was renumbered as the fourth lodge of NSW.

Formed in 1840, the original members of the Maitland Lodge of Unity (at this point, numbering 18) were those leading influential businessmen of the booming Maitland township who were tasked with developing and maintaining the cultural and social progress of the communities of the Hunter region.

Although the lodge did not have a permanent meeting place (as was the case for many young lodges with fledgling numbers), meetings were held at a number of different venues that were available, discreet and confidential. As well as the private residences of members, early meetings of the Maitland Lodge of Unity were held at the Rose Inn (the publican, Philip Joseph Cohen, was himself a mason and lodge member) as well as the Waterloo Inn and the Australian Hotel.

By the tenth anniversary of the formation of the Maitland Lodge of Unity in 1850, its membership had swelled to 50 but, over the next two decades, the lodge was to experience wavering support in its numbers. By the 1860s, Maitland's role as the chief town in the region was in decline. Its agricultural industry had been hit critically by a wheat rust outbreak and flooding of the Hunter River had damaged crops and made river travel increasingly difficult. By 1869, due largely to financial, conduct and attendance difficulties, membership of the lodge had hit a low of only 19 people.

To survive the challenges facing the town, Maitland diversified its business into alternative industries, fundamentally changing how it used its landscape and subsequently witnessed a revival of its commercial interests. Only four years after its lowest membership numbers since its establishment, the lodge saw a resurgence and, by 1873, numbers had reached its highest point with 81 masons.

With this increase in membership came an increase in funding which made the probability of the Maitland Lodge of Unity securing its first permanent venue plausible. The lodge soon purchased land at 280 High Street Maitland but quickly realised that the cost of developing this site was unachievable. The Greater Northern Permanent Building, Investment and Loan Society was to develop the site and rented two of its rooms to the lodge from 1877 for a ten-year period with the option to purchase.

In 1884 however, the lodge purchased land at Victoria Street, Maitland and commissioned prominent local architect, and also a lodge member, J. W. Pender to design a permanent purpose-built building for the lodge (Pender was, coincidentally, also the architect of the High Street development). On 3 August 1886, the existing two buildings on the site had been demolished and the foundation stone for the new lodge building was laid by the wife of lodge member, Brother Levy (traditionally a fraternal organisation, it is of note that a woman was invited to formally lay the foundation stone for the new Masonic lodge building). Completed in March 1887, the Maitland Lodge of Unity building was officially opened by the Master of the Lodge, Worshipful Master Thomas Browne.

In 1888, and in an effort to achieve a Grand Lodge that was responsive to the needs and requirements of Australian freemasonry and independent of the Grand Lodges of the British Isles, the lodges of NSW (including the Maitland Lodge of Unity) amalgamated to form the United Grand Lodge of New South Wales and the Australian Capital Territory which would, from that time on, be the main governing body for freemasonry in the state.

As the Maitland Lodge of Unity grew, the lodge slowly expanded its facilities and acquired plots of land surrounding the Victoria Street site. In 1927, the lodge constructed a second building, fronting Grant Street and called "The South", to be used as a supper room and for community social purposes.

== Description ==
Designed by prominent regional architect and lodge member John W. Pender, the Masonic Hall of the Maitland Lodge of Unity is an ornately decorated building of the Late Victorian style with stylistic elements of "Arabesque" or "Moorish" influence. Of brick construction with a pitched timber framed roof, the lodge building has a rendered painted facade fronting Victoria Street with highly decorative elements including mouldings, mock domes and Masonic emblems. Fenced at street level with a palisade fence and gates, the lodge building is entered via a raised central porch with horse-shoe arches and ornate symbolic imagery.

The lodge building is face brick on side elevations and is topped with a timber-framed roof lantern with glazed pivot windows and timber louvres.

Internally, the Masonic Hall of the Maitland Lodge of Unity conforms to the measurements, principles and proportions of double cube construction which is the principle of freemasonry design. The lodge building includes two spaces: a simply designed and largely undecorated ante room that leads to a more ornately decorated temple room. Decorated with a central linoleum floor panel with Masonic imagery (including the 'blazing sun'), the temple has a coved roof, central lantern and triangular "G" icon suspended from the ceiling that symbolises God. The temple is highly decorated with mouldings, cornices, vents and Masonic emblems (including the eight-point star formed by the double cube).

The second lodge building, constructed in 1927 and fronting Grant Street, is a simply detailed building without the detailing and Masonic references of the lodge building. Of brick construction with a gabled terracotta tile roof, the building contains a hall and kitchen that are both vernacular and functional in design and use. This building is of lesser heritage value but contributes to the use of the 1887 Masonic Hall.

A small Victorian hall still used for its original purpose. Face brick sides, gabled iron roof with clerestory lights along ridge. Elaborate stuccoed facade and porch in Moorish/Indian influenced style incorporating masonic emblems. Side timber porch in similar style. Simple iron fence on masonry base. Set in a narrow street of other worth while Victorian buildings. Condition excellent. Interior not seen. Architectural Style: Moorish/Indian influenced. Building Material: Brick.

== Heritage listing ==
The Maitland Lodge of Unity Masonic Hall and Lodge is of state heritage significance as the fifth Masonic lodge established in NSW, and the first to be formed outside Sydney. Established in 1840, the Maitland Lodge of Unity constructed the Masonic lodge building in 1887 as the first permanent purpose-built venue for their freemasonry activities.

The Masonic lodge building is associated with John W. Pender, a prominent regional architect and a leader in the civic development of the Hunter region during the 19th century.

The Maitland Lodge of Unity Masonic Hall and Lodge is a fine representative example of a Masonic lodge designed to the perfect measurements and proportions of the double cube principle of freemasonry design. An aesthetically distinctive and decorative building of the Late Victorian style, the Masonic lodge building incorporates stylistic elements of "Arabesque" or "Moorish" influence which were rare aesthetic and architectural features in a regional colonial outpost in the 19th century.

Maitland Lodge of Unity Masonic Hall and Lodge was listed on the New South Wales State Heritage Register on 19 December 2014 having satisfied the following criteria.

The place is important in demonstrating the course, or pattern, of cultural or natural history in New South Wales.

The Maitland Lodge of Unity Masonic Hall and Lodge is of state heritage significance as the fifth Masonic lodge established in NSW, and the first to be formed outside Sydney.

Formed in 1840, the Maitland Lodge of Unity constructed the Masonic lodge building in 1887 as the first permanent purpose-built venue for their freemasonry activities. Designed by prominent regional architect and lodge member J. W. Pender, the lodge building reflects the resurgence of Maitland as a regional commercial centre in the late 19th century. Members of the lodge included the leading community members and businessmen who were instrumental in the revival of Maitland in this period.

The place has a strong or special association with a person, or group of persons, of importance of cultural or natural history of New South Wales's history.

The Maitland Lodge of Unity Masonic Hall and Lodge is of state heritage significance for its association with the prominent regional architect, John Wilshire Pender. A significant architect in the development of the Hunter region in the 19th century and a prominent community leader, Pender was a member of the Maitland Lodge of Unity from c. 1886 and was commissioned to design a permanent purpose-built venue for freemasonry activities in Maitland.

J. W. Pender has also been attributed with the design of the following SHR-listed items: Cintra House, Maitland (1878, SHR No.1892), former Maitland Synagogue (1879, SHR No.376), Anambah House, Anambah (1889, SHR No.275) and Saumarez Homestead, Armidale (1888, SHR No.1505).

The Maitland Lodge of Unity Masonic Hall and Lodge is also of state heritage significance for its association with those prominent community members and businessmen (and lodge members) that were integral to the development of Maitland and the Hunter region in the 19th century. .

The place is important in demonstrating aesthetic characteristics and/or a high degree of creative or technical achievement in New South Wales.

The Maitland Lodge of Unity Masonic Hall and Lodge is of state heritage significance as an aesthetically distinctive and decorative purpose-built Masonic hall. Designed by prominent regional architect and lodge member John W. Pender, the Masonic Hall of the Maitland Lodge of Unity is an ornately decorated building of the Late Victorian style. Designed in contrast to the functionalist Classical design of many other Masonic lodge halls in NSW, many of which adapted existing buildings for Masonic activities, Pender's design for the Maitland Masonic Hall also incorporated stylistic elements of "Arabesque" or "Moorish" influence which were rare aesthetic and architectural features in a regional colonial outpost in the 19th century.

With a rendered painted brick facade fronting Victoria Street, the purpose-built Maitland Lodge of Unity Masonic Hall incorporates highly decorative elements including mouldings, archways, mock domes and Masonic emblems. Conforming to the perfect measurements of the double cube principle of freemasonry design (evident in the length, width and height of the building), both the exterior and interior of the Masonic hall is ornately decorated and highly detailed with symbolic images. Symbolism, a traditional and fundamental teaching of freemasonry, is evident throughout the Masonic Hall of the Maitland Lodge of Unity through the use of key emblems such as the eight-point star formed by the double cube, the blazing sun on the central floor panel and the triangular "G" icon suspended from the ceiling symbolising God.

The place has strong or special association with a particular community or cultural group in New South Wales for social, cultural or spiritual reasons.

The Maitland Lodge of Unity Masonic Hall and Lodge is held in high social esteem by the community as it continues to retain its original use as a permanent purpose-built venue for freemasonry activities in the Hunter region. Since the lodge was formed in 1840 and the Masonic hall established in 1887, the Maitland Lodge of Unity has been valued by the Masonic membership and the community continues to retain an attachment and regard for the freemasons, their longevity in the community and their social and charitable practices for others.

The place has potential to yield information that will contribute to an understanding of the cultural or natural history of New South Wales.

Prior to the construction of the Masonic Hall of the Maitland Lodge of Unity in 1886–87, the Victoria Street site was occupied by two earlier buildings - the larger in the northern corner of the site and a smaller structure in the eastern corner. Demolished for the construction of the Masonic hall, there may be some potential for archaeological remnants of the earlier buildings to remain if further research was undertaken.

The place possesses uncommon, rare or endangered aspects of the cultural or natural history of New South Wales.

The Maitland Lodge of Unity Masonic Hall and Lodge is of state heritage significance as a rare example of an architecturally inspired and distinctive purpose-built Masonic hall.

Designed by prominent regional architect and lodge member John W Pender, the Masonic Hall of the Maitland Lodge of Unity is an ornately decorated building of the Late Victorian style. Designed in contrast to the functionalist, vernacular or Classical design of many other Masonic lodge halls in NSW (many of which adapted existing buildings for Masonic activities), Pender's design for the Maitland Masonic Hall creatively incorporated stylistic elements of "Arabesque" or "Moorish" influence which were rare aesthetic and architectural features in a regional colonial outpost in the 19th century.

The features of the Maitland Lodge of Unity Masonic Hall and Lodge are also of particular interest as the lodge was the first to be established in a newly settled and developing regional area outside of Sydney.

The place is important in demonstrating the principal characteristics of a class of cultural or natural places/environments in New South Wales.

The Maitland Lodge of Unity Masonic Hall and Lodge is of state heritage significance as a fine representative example of a Masonic lodge designed to the perfect measurements and proportions of the double cube principle of freemasonry design (evident in the length, width and height of the building). The Masonic hall incorporates many of the traditional symbolism of freemasonry that are fundamental to the teaching of the practice (such as the eight-point star formed by the double cube, the blazing sun on the central floor panel and the triangular "G" icon suspended from the ceiling symbolising God).

Although the double cube principles and symbolism is practiced throughout the design of many Masonic lodges in NSW, the Maitland Lodge of Unity Masonic Hall and Lodge is a particularly fine and well maintained example in the state.
