= Edward Close =

Edward Close may refer to:

- Edward Charles Close (1790–1866), British soldier, engineer and member of the New South Wales Legislative Council
- Edward Close Jr. (1825–1887), pastoralist and member of the New South Wales Legislative Assembly, son of Edward Charles Close.
