= Cintra House, Maitland =

Building in New South Wales, Australia

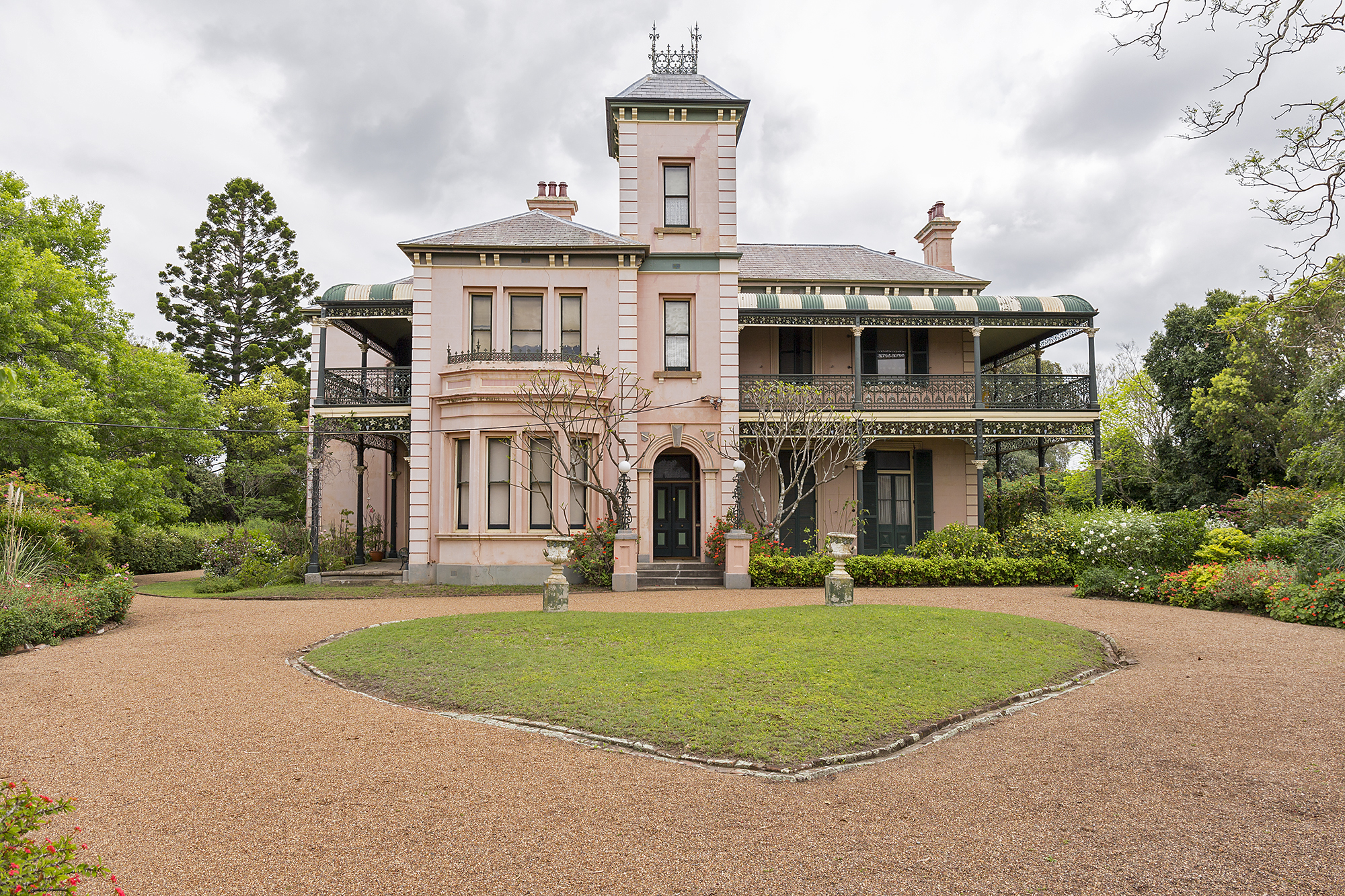
- Cintra House
- Interactive map of the Cintra House, Maitland area

General information
- Architectural style: Victorian Filigree, Victorian Italianate
- Location within New South Wales Location within Australia
- 32°43′51″S 151°32′44″E
- Location: 34 Regent Street, Maitland, City of Maitland, New South Wales, Australia

History
- Built: 1878–1879

Site notes
- Architect(s): Buildings and extensions: John Wiltshire Pender; Garden: Mr R Culbert (Sydney landscape architect)

New South Wales Heritage Register
- Official name: Cintra – House, Garden and Stables
- Type: state heritage (built)
- Designated: 31 August 2012
- Reference no.: 01892
- Type: Villa
- Category: Residential buildings (private)
- Builders: House, Stables, Fence & Garden – Robert James; 1887 Ext. – H Noad; Underground water tanks – I Morris

Cintra House is a heritage-listed residence and one-time private hospital at 34 Regent Street, Maitland, in the Hunter Region of New South Wales, Australia. It was designed by John Wiltshire Pender with a garden by Sydney landscape architect R. Culbert. It was built from 1879 by Robert James with an 1887 extension by H. Noad. It is also known as Cintra. It was added to the New South Wales State Heritage Register on 31 August 2012.

== History ==
=== Cintra House and Garden ===
The early history of Cintra is connected to the Levy and Cohen families, part of an important Jewish merchant family locally and internationally.

Cintra was designed and constructed as a private residence for Benn W. Levy in 1878 by Maitland architect J. W. Pender. Benn Levy became the head of the Cohen business in London in 1886, moving there in 1887. This saw ownership of Cintra transferred to his cousin Neville Cohen. In 1887 Pender designed extensions to Cintra for Neville Cohen and his family. Originally the house had 23 rooms, and the extensions added a second wing on the northern side, making it 31 rooms including the attic and cellar. The new second wing consisted of a billiard room, servants' hall, housekeeper's room, an additional four bedrooms and bathroom facilities.

Early in the 20th century, business and family dispersion rendered Cintra impracticable to the Cohen family and was sold to the Long family in 1917. Cintra was left in the charge of five sisters and was run as a private hospital from World War One until the late 1930s when it again became a private residence. The sisters, "though genteel, when left to their own devices, pursued life-long careers in art, music, nursing, physiotherapy and advertising." Cintra as a private hospital was operated under the auspices of Nurse Eileen Long until its closure in the late 1930s or early 1940s due to lack of resources. The hospital is known to still be operating in 1938.

Strong rumours surfaced during the period that the hospital closed that the property would be taken over by the Department of Defence. However, this did not take place. Instead, residential flats were established in the northern wing. Richard and Yvonne Long took possession in 1965 and the flats were left vacant until as they became unoccupied and were later restored as part of the private residence.

The Long family undertook maintenance and restoration works to the interior and exterior, including painting, garden works and fencing. Although there is an extensive movable heritage collection, inclusive of personal possessions from the last century onwards which contribute to Cintra's appearance, these are not original to the property. The garden, complete with its original planting schemes and garden features contributes significantly to the house and as evidence of the period to which it belongs.

In 1988, the building was refurbished, with the demolition and replacement of unoriginal bathrooms and kitchen.

In 1990–92 Cintra received two loans allowing the owners to conserve its original intact verandah over a two-year period of works. Tallowwood (Eucalyptus microcorys) was used as a substitute for the original beech wood, which had become unsafe due to water damage.

=== The David Cohen Company in Australia ===
The growing Jewish community in Maitland in the late nineteenth century contributed to the urban and economic development of Maitland. More importantly, the families of the David Cohen Company played a central role in the development of commercial ventures in the region and expanded the trade of the colony. The David Cohen company's store and warehouse was notable, as its "size and opulence visually marked the prosperity of its proprietors and of the town, and when connected to other buildings constructed for the company and its family of owners in Maitland, Newcastle and Sydney, the success of David Cohen & Company is clearly widespread, deep, awe inspiring and formidable".

Benn Levy and Neville Cohen were the descendants of the founders of David Cohen & Co. Ltd. Benn Levy was the nephew of David Lewis Levy who founded the renowned Lewis' department store in Liverpool in the United Kingdom while Neville Cohen was the cousin of George Judah Cohen, the chairman of the Commercial Banking Company of Sydney in the early 20th century and who was praised as the "doyen" of Australian banking.

Brothers David, Lewis and Samuel Cohen arrived in Australia between 1831 and 1840. In 1835 Lewis and Samuel bought land in High Street, Maitland which later became the site of their warehouse. In 1836 Samuel opened a shop selling a wide variety of goods and known as Lambeth House. This was the beginning of the Cohen family company in Australia. In 1837 Lewis and Samuel established a business partnership. However, this only lasted until 1839. Samuel continued to trade in Maitland while Lewis set up business in Campbelltown and Sydney. In 1840 their first cousin, Lewis Wolfe Levy migrated to Australia. He lived briefly in Maitland before opening a successful store in Tamworth. Lewis returned to Maitland in 1854. The brother's business interests were consolidated between 1843 and 1845. Samuel Levy filed for insolvency in 1843 and his brother David took over the debts. In 1845 Lewis Levy joined the firm. David Cohen's name (the youngest brother) was given to the firm due to the quality of his reputation and the company became the largest firm in the Maitland district.

The company constructed a warehouse on their land in High Street in 1865 that was designed by John Horbury Hunt. From 1880 onwards they commissioned and leased a number of other warehouses including constructing the six-storey warehouse at their Newcastle East site in 1890.

David Cohen and Co. sold whatever goods were popular and could be imported in reasonable condition at the time. These included tools, clocks, sewing machines and electro-plated ware imported from America. From around 1900 they concentrated on English branded grocery lines and teas in their advertising.

Lewis Levy led a vigorous expansion of David Cohen and Co. The company prospered, the firm grew and the partners of the company became more prominent in society. In 1912 David Cohen and Co became a public company and George Cohen, Chairman of the CBC Bank and the United Insurance Company, became its first Chairman. A resolution ensured that the company remained firmly in the control of the family.

David Cohen & Co. Ltd continued the business of wholesale grocery and market of products from outside Australia until its decline when local manufacturing and delivery in Australia took over. The company never recovered from the Depression. The company name is preserved on the Frederick Menkens designed David Cohen & Co. Warehouse facade in Bolton Street, Newcastle.

=== The Cohen and Levy families ===
Samuel Cohen and Lewis Levy both became members of parliament for country seats. Members of both families also served charities, local community organisations and hospitals during their lifetime. Dr R. J. Pierce of Maitland Hospital Committee commented that few firms in the colony were as generous to charitable causes as David Cohen & Co. In 1888 Lewis Levy's family gave to Sydney the marble fountain topped by a bronze figure near the Woolloomooloo gates of the Botanical Gardens. Neville and Samuel Cohen were president of Maitland and Newcastle hospitals respectively during their rebuilding. George, Samuel and Neville all held office in the Great Synagogue of Sydney and the family exercised influential leadership in the small Jewish communities of Maitland and Newcastle. The family, particularly Samuel (the elder) and George Cohen, were integral to the establishment of the Maitland Synagogue, c. 1879, the first outside of Sydney. Samuel Cohen established the German Jewish Relief Fund which became the Australian Jewish Welfare Society and raised funds, with Commonwealth government support from 1938, to select and provide for deserving refugees to migrate to Australia.

=== Comparative information ===
A review of Hunter Region heritage listings identifies a small number of large Victorian Italianate boom style villas constructed in the 1870-90s, which originally enjoyed substantial gardens and outbuildings. Most have since been subdivided or adapted for residential flats and significantly altered internally. Regional Victorian villas of similar age to Cintra, but smaller in scale, in more restricted settings and internally altered include Grossman House, Bishops Residence, Benholm, Moncrieff and 86-88 Victoria Street in Maitland, and Atherstone in Muswellbrook. Cintra is the principal intact example of the highly creative work of the architectural firm of J.W. Pender in this period; Anambah House at Rutherford and Belltrees at Scone being later.

Cintra retains its entire original garden setting, mature plantings and stables outbuilding. The property has undergone relatively few alterations, retaining much of its original architectural character. It has historical associations with the Cohen and Levy families and has subsequently remained under the stewardship of the Long family.

JW Pender's architectural practice operated for 125 years, with his son Walter, and grandson Ian continuing his work. Pender's work includes aforementioned Benhome, Leeholme and numerous civic and business buildings around the Hunter Valley and further afield. The firm's original drawings, specifications and other records are now conserved in the University of Newcastle library, including the documents for their grand Villa design, Cintra.

== Description ==
=== House ===
Cintra is a large two-storey villa built in the late Victorian era in the Italianate boom style of architecture. It is situated on its original block with driveways, paths, gardens, lawns, stables etc. in their original layout. The house is built of brick on a concrete foundation, and rendered with a slate roof. The house has 31 rooms, balconies, verandahs and a three-storey tower totalling over 965 square metres. The tower reaches to 14 metres above the entry vestibule and is topped with cast iron embellishments. Above the smoking room/ attic within the tower was a 2,000 gallon water tank fed by a pumping system from a 7,500 gallon circular underground tank at the rear of the house. Linked to this a rectangular underground tank was constructed to hold a further 20,000 gallons. The home was therefore serviced interiorly by both gravity feed or if necessary by pumping, as also were the gardens. The mansard roofed tower is also covered in Bangor slates.

The balconies have iron roofs supported at the corners by curved solid timber beams and finely fluted cast iron Corinthian columns over 4.3 metres tall, produced by Taylor and Wearing of Redfern. There is extensive and intricate cast-iron lace balustrading and trellis on the balconies. The cast iron verandah friezes feature a design of grape vine and leaf with pendant fruit painted and highlighted.

The villa has two wings to the rear which form a U-shaped courtyard. Internally, there are two staircases in addition to the servants' stairs, attic stairs and cellar stairs. The main staircase rises from the entrance hall and has finely turned cedar balusters and decorative newel posts. The second staircase is in the north wing.

The rooms are lofty (ceiling height downstairs is 4 metres and upstairs 3.7m), well-proportioned with cedar joinery and elaborate cornices to the major rooms. The rooms opening onto the verandahs have stone thresholds, French doors and louvered shutters. Many of the rooms have marble mantlepieces with tessellated tile hearths. The bathrooms for the upstairs bedrooms were fitted with hot and cold water, a shower bath and lavatory.

The main public rooms feature marble mantlepieces. The original interior detailing, exuded luxury, from the costly imported gas light fittings to the ebony and gold or white and gold door furniture.

The single storey wing on the southwest side of the building contains the original kitchen, scullery and laundry. The external barred airshaft to the cellar is visible on the south wall.

Beneath the house is a cellar and a strong room arched in solid brickwork, which may have been fitted with an iron safe door prior to 1915.

When Benn W. Levy relocated from Cintra back to London in 1887 to operate the Cohen company there, the original household furniture and effects were put up for sale by auction. The auction notice that ran in the Maitland Mercury describes the contents of the house in full with descriptive detail including shape, colour, and design of the furniture and contents. No original contents remain except for a cupboard (possibly used as a kitchen sideboard/shelves but now functions as a bookcase).

=== Garden ===
Cintra has retained its original driveways, garden, stables and coach house.

The formal late nineteenth century town/ villa garden is entered through the original wrought iron carriage and pedestrian gates hung on moulded sandstone posts at the front of the property. The gates lead onto the brick edged heart shaped lawn which surrounds a carriage loop. The lawn in the centre of the loop is adorned with a pair of terracotta urns on pedestals, by the Sydney potter Thomas Field. Two tall elaborate iron light standards flank the stone steps to the house.

A gravelled drive continues from the loop, around the house to allow carriage access to the coach house at the rear. The drive is lined with hedges of may bush (Spiraea sp.), Cape plumbago (P.capensis), olive (Olea europaea), Wisteria sp. and leads to random built stone walls delineating the service area.

Formal lawns and pathways border the house. To each side of the carriage loop are irregularly curving beds, which still contain the descendants and original palms and bird-of-paradise-flowers (Strelitzia sp.), along with other plantings including shrubs and perennials popular in the Victorian age.

A brick edged path runs parallel to the northern eastern boundary fence, separated by a border of shrubs. The brick edging was originally tiles, fragments of which remain beneath the ground. To the north of the house another open rectangular lawn, originally described as being for croquet and bowls, has two very large elaborate cast and wrought iron flower jardinieres along the path on the eastern end. After the First World War a tennis court was constructed on the northern lawn, but has since been removed to reinstate the original lawn.

To the south and west (rear) of the house although there are some mature trees there is modest landscaping. Araucarias originally bordered the Regent Street entrance. Throughout Cintra's grounds are significant mature bunya bunya (Araucaria bidwillii), hoop pine (Araucaria cunninghamii), Cape chestnut (Calodendrum capense), lemon scented gums (Corymbia citriodora), jacarandas (Jacaranda mimosifolia), Canary Island pine (Pinus canariensis), Brazilian pepper trees (Schinus molle var.areira), small leafed figs (Ficus sp.) and Moreton Bay figs (Ficus macrophylla).

A summer house, now demolished, overlooked the lawn from the west. The property also contains a coach house and stables building along the rear boundary and two other garden sheds between the rear boundary and the house.

=== Stables ===
At the rear of the house is a two-storeyed sandstock brick gabled building which includes coach house and stables over a stone flagged floor with dish drain. In the Maitland Mercury April 26, 1879, the ground floor of the stables building is described as including a coach house, harness room, two stalled stable and loose box. The rooms were thoroughly ventilated with louvre windows. Above the stables on the first floor is a hay loft and a groom's room. This building was connected to the water tanks and sewer pits.

=== Condition ===
As at 24 April 2014, the house and garden have been maintained to an excellent standard, with the aim of conserving the property's authenticity and original architectural features, plantings and landscape elements.

Although it is spaciously planted, the density of vegetation reflects its original appearance and is true to its Victorian design. Large plantings such as the Araucarias have been removed and replaced with young trees for safety reasons.

The high scallop-topped front picket fence, which is shown in a c.1895 photograph, has also been replaced. However, the design and construction of the new fence replicates the original fencing, as closely as possible, and retains the original gates and piers.

The paths and carriageway (currently a driveway) are maintained with locally sourced, finely graded washed river gravel as per the original paths and carriageway.

Within the grounds there is archaeological potential for the footings and under-floor deposit of the Summer House. The underground water tanks remain in situ. Post holes may exist in an archaeological context where the horse yards were situated to the south east of the coach house and stables building.

A 2010 report indicates that there is evidence of cracking and overall movement of the masonry walls within the house, which requires attention.

Cintra is exceptionally intact, the house still sited on its original allotment. All original outbuildings except for the Summer House (now demolished) are extant, and the garden layout retains its original design and plantings, except for the replacement of a few key specimen trees with younger varieties. The front fence has been replaced with a new fence that replicates the original. A council footpath and roadway encroaches slightly in the south west corner.

== Heritage listing ==
Cintra House, Garden and Stables is of State heritage significance for its exceptional aesthetic value as an outstanding, highly intact example of a Victorian Italianate style town villa with original and early interiors and extant outbuildings and service wings, including the original stables, kitchen, scullery and laundry, set within an historic landscaped garden setting. The house within its setting is a widely recognised architectural landmark in Maitland. It contributes to the heritage of the Hunter Valley, demonstrating the pattern of settlement and commercial expansion of the region prior to the growth of Newcastle.

Constructed in 1878, it is significant for its historical associations with the eminent Hunter architectural firm of J. W. Pender, who designed the house and outbuildings; the famous Jewish merchant families of Levy and Cohen, for whom Cintra was built; and its association and links to the Jewish community in Maitland and Sydney, NSW, and the United Kingdom.

It is a benchmark of its architectural style.

Cintra House was listed on the New South Wales State Heritage Register on 31 August 2012 having satisfied the following criteria.

The place is important in demonstrating the course, or pattern, of cultural or natural history in New South Wales.

Cintra demonstrates the pattern of development of the Hunter region, as pastoralism establishes town development and commercial expansion, followed by civic infrastructure and community pride. Its detailed architectural design and complementary outbuilding and gates are evidence of the development of Maitland's permanent settlement and the expansion of Jewish commercial interests in the region. Cintra is physical evidence of the growth and expansion of the prominent architectural firm of J.W. Pender and of the local and regional development of quality tradesman and suppliers able to construct substantial buildings within the region. The house and garden form a cultural landscape demonstrating the continuous pattern of residential use and occupation by the Cohen and Long families over 125 years.

The place has a strong or special association with a person, or group of persons, of importance of cultural or natural history of New South Wales's history.

Cintra has significance for its strong and lengthy association with John W. Pender, a Maitland architect prominent in the development of the Hunter region in the nineteenth century. Cintra's extension was also designed by John W. Pender, who possessed a wide range of talents including cast iron frieze designs and manufacturing.

The life and work of the Cohen and Levy families is especially associated with Cintra, which originally belonged to Benn Levy and Neville Cohen, part of a well-known Jewish merchant family important in the development of trade, commerce and the economy in Maitland, Newcastle, Sydney and the UK. Both families were generous to the community and charitable causes, the Levy fountain at the Woolloomooloo gates of the Sydney Botanical Gardens being testament to this.

The place is important in demonstrating aesthetic characteristics and/or a high degree of creative or technical achievement in New South Wales.

Cintra is State significant for its ability to demonstrate the aesthetic characteristics of both the Victorian era town villa and the Victorian Italianate style of architecture. The property is an intact and representative example of boom period house and garden in rural towns of the late nineteenth century. The property's curved carriage loop, ornamental specimen plants, decorative urns, elaborate gates, intricate cast iron verandah friezes, asymmetrical massing, prominent tower, grouped openings, colonnaded loggia, rendered wall finish, stepped lintels, bracketed eaves, low pitched hipped verandah roof, charm, formality and status in the landscape, are all characteristics that epitomise the Victorian period Italianate design (c. 1840-c. 1890). Not only is the house aesthetically significant at a State level, it is complemented by a garden of "attractive enclosed scenes with detail and focii, and a heart shaped carriage way". The villa complex is exceptionally intact with its original and early interiors and original stables, carriage house, water tanks, kitchen, laundry and scullery at the rear.

The place has a strong or special association with a particular community or cultural group in New South Wales for social, cultural or spiritual reasons.

Cintra has special associations with the early Jewish community in New South Wales. It represents the hard earned success of the Jewish merchant families and also their contribution to the Jewish community and Australian society. Their commercial ventures saw the Hunter Region well supplied with goods and products from the UK and the latest from America. The Cohen and Levy families created significant commercial and residential buildings such as Cintra, and the 1879 David Cohen and Co. warehouse (the lower storey of which still remains in High Street, Maitland). The Cohen and Levy families were well respected in both the Jewish and wider community. The Cohen family were also the prime instigators for church services and eventually the construction of the Maitland Synagogue, the first outside of Sydney. Many descendants of the original owners and others associated with these two Jewish families have visited Cintra both from the local area and as far as Jamaica, Montana and London.

The place has potential to yield information that will contribute to an understanding of the cultural or natural history of New South Wales.

Cintra, together with its garden and stables, is State significant as a benchmark reference site for NSW's Boom style villas.

The place possesses uncommon, rare or endangered aspects of the cultural or natural history of New South Wales.

Cintra is State significant as a rare example of a boom style Victorian Italianate Villa in a regional setting. This Late Victorian Villa is of exceptional integrity, with original house layout, original and early interiors, kitchen, scullery, laundry wing, coach house, stables and garden remaining intact.

The place is important in demonstrating the principal characteristics of a class of cultural or natural places/environments in New South Wales.

Cintra is State significant as a benchmark property, important in demonstrating accurately the architectural and landscaping style of an Italianate Victorian country town villa. It retains special features, including the heart shaped carriage loop and lawn. Cintra is Maitland's principal residence of the High Victorian era, and its most intact example of boom-style architecture. It retains all the dominant architectural style indicators including intricate cast iron friezes, asymmetrical massing, prominent tower, complemented by a period garden in its original layout, decorative urns, elaborate gates and the original coach house and stables building. The formality and authenticity of the house and garden have ensured that Cintra House epitomises the Victorian period Italianate design (c. 1840-c. 1890).
