= Maitland Jewish Cemetery =

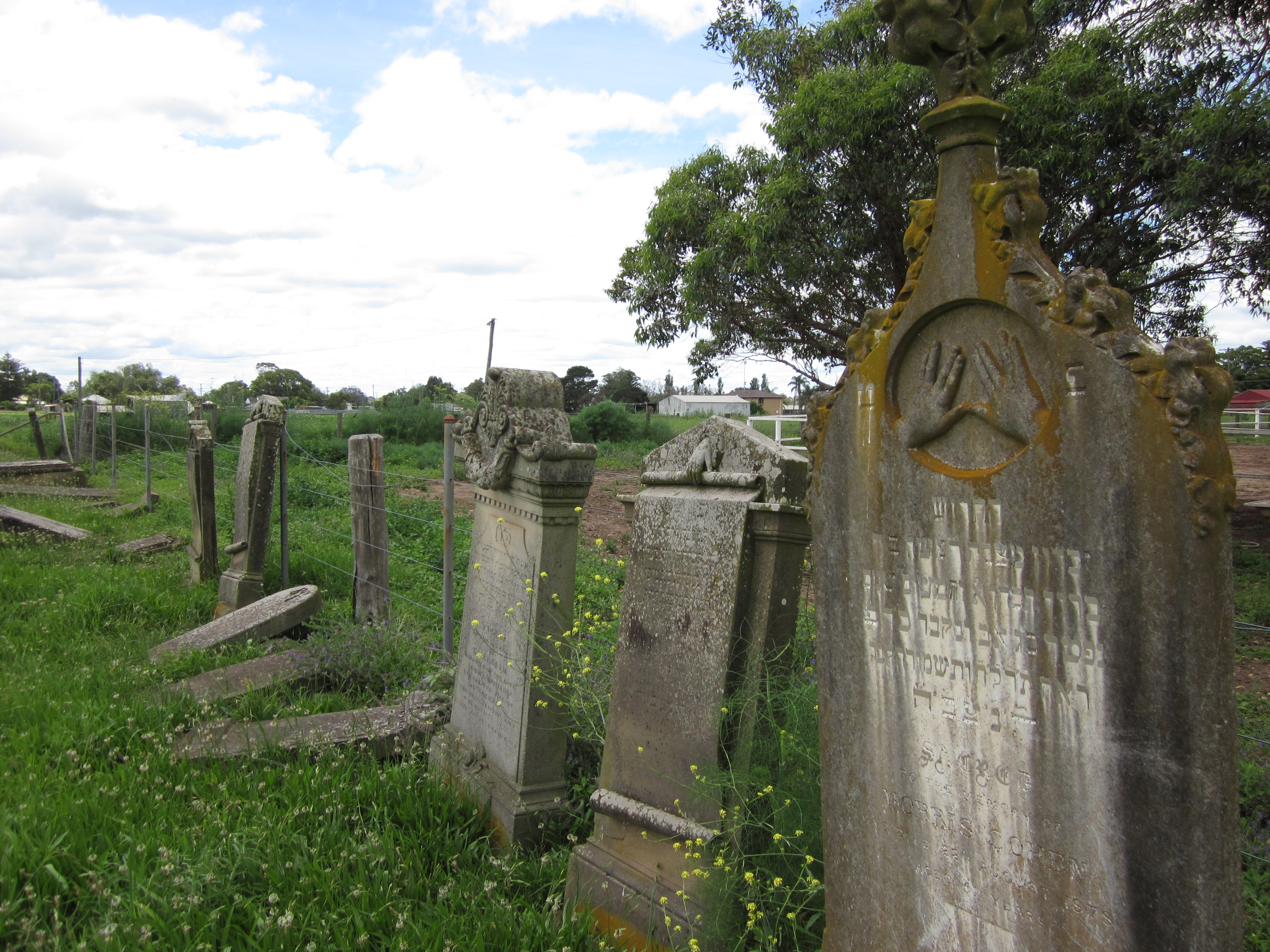
- Headstones at Maitland Jewish Cemetery, 2010

- Location within New South Wales Location within Australia
- 32.7490°S 151.5574°E
- Location: 112–114 Louth Park Road, South Maitland, City of Maitland, New South Wales, Australia

History
- Built: 1846–1934

Site notes
- Owner: Maitland City Council

New South Wales Heritage Register
- Official name: Maitland Jewish Cemetery
- Type: state heritage (archaeological-terrestrial)
- Designated: 7 March 2014
- Reference no.: 1921
- Type: Cemetery/Graveyard/Burial Ground
- Category: Cemeteries and Burial Sites

Maitland Jewish Cemetery is a heritage-listed closed cemetery at 112–114 Louth Park Road, South Maitland, City of Maitland, New South Wales, Australia. It was in use from 1846 to 1934. The property is owned by Maitland City Council. It was added to the New South Wales State Heritage Register on 7 March 2014.

== History ==
As the colony of New South Wales expanded into the Hunter Valley in the early 19th century, with Maitland was strategically positioned on the Hunter River, it soon became a booming new township for commerce and trade between the region and Sydney. Known then as Wallis Plains, the establishment and success of the shipping trade along the river resulted in the expansion of the district as land grants were allocated amongst the settlers, many of whom were Jewish entrepreneurs. Bringing their business skills from Sydney, and often from their native England, the Jewish colonists soon became prosperous leaders of the burgeoning community and formed a strong core for the small Jewish community of the region.

Adherence to tradition was often used by colonists to establish a community and connect people to a new place. As followers of the Orthodox faith, the Jewish community soon established a dedicated burial ground on which to observe the burial rites and customs of the religion. In keeping with Jewish tradition, a parcel of land was acquired in 1846 beyond the outskirts of the township and in an area isolated from neighbouring residences. Attained "upon trust for a Burial Place for the internment (sic) of deceased members of the Jewish Religion" the first burial for the cemetery took place in 1849 for young Jane Cohen, an 11-year old girl who had succumbed to the scarlet fever disease epidemic of the time.

As the strength of the Jewish community grew in the region, so too did the number of burials at the cemetery. A cottage structure was established on the site to receive the dead and where rites and prayer rituals could take place prior to interment. The rarity of a dedicated Jewish cemetery north of Sydney also bought Jewish people from afar for interment.

The strength of the Jewish community in the mid-to-late 19th century is also reflected in the erection of the Maitland Synagogue in 1879. However, when the synagogue ceased functioning as a place of worship in 1898, it was evident that the presence of the Jewish community in Maitland was wavering. As the numbers of the community slowly dwindled, so too did the number of burials occurring at the cemetery. After the last burial in 1934, the cemetery was considered to be "full".

As the years passed, the cemetery experienced periods of neglect. The cottage was removed, occasional floods swept through the site and vegetation slowly took control. Renewed community interest in the historic site has evolved in recent decades and the cemetery was reconsecrated in 1979. Ownership was transferred to Maitland City Council in 1992 and one final burial took place in 2010. Following this, the cemetery was officially closed.

== Description ==
Located 3 kilometres (1.9 mi) from the centre of Maitland, the Jewish Cemetery is sited at the end of a narrow unsealed laneway in a rural field landscape. In keeping with Jewish tradition, the cemetery was established beyond the outskirts of the township and the graves positioned to face west away from the neighbouring settlement and its residents.

Bounded by a post and wire fence (which replaced an earlier timber paling fence), the cemetery contains 53 burial sites. Positioned in four rows, the graves are laid out in a north-south direction with the earlier burials at its highest point while the later graves continue down the sloping site. A row of children's graves is positioned along the northern boundary.

Of the 53 grave sites, 46 headstones remain in varying states of repair. Dating mostly from 1849 to 1909, the Hebrew and English inscriptions may have faded with age but the form and ornamentation of the monuments indicate the importance of adherence to the Jewish faith during the interment process. Mostly discreet in nature, the monuments reflect the Jewish tradition that "in death, all are equal".

=== Condition ===
As at 18 July 2013, of the 53 grave sites, 46 headstones remain in varying states of repair. Dating mostly from 1849 to 1909, many of the Hebrew and English inscriptions have faded with age and weather exposure. Some headstones have also collapsed but recent conservation works (2013–14) has seen the restoration of many of the stones.

The rural nature of the site is reflected in the grassed condition of the cemetery. However, this receives regular maintenance.

The post and wire fence enclosing the cemetery allows neighbouring livestock to graze the outskirts of the cemetery which could cause subsidence or collapse of the outlying monuments. The current fence replaced an earlier timber paling fence which could be a replacement enclosure at some future point in time.

Of the 53 burial sites within the cemetery, the retention of 46 headstone monuments makes the cemetery the most intact dedicated Jewish cemetery in NSW.

=== Modifications and dates ===
- 1846 – cemetery established
- 1849 – first burial took place
- c. 1920s – general repairs
- 1934 – last burial took place
- c. 1930s – cottage was removed/demolished or collapsed
- c. 1955 – monument restoration following floods
- c. mid 20th century – original timber paling fence removed
- 1978 – renewed maintenance of site involved vegetation clearance
- 2010 – new burial took place

== Heritage listing ==
Maitland Jewish Cemetery is of state heritage significance as the earliest and largest dedicated Jewish cemetery in NSW. With 53 burials in total (dating, in the most part, from 1849 to 1909), the cemetery retains 46 of its original headstones which makes this site the most intact dedicated Jewish cemetery in the state.

Established in 1846 by prominent Jewish settlers of the Maitland region, the cemetery served the Orthodox Jewish community of the surrounding Hunter Valley region and the broader Jewish community of NSW. The cemetery is a physical record of the Jewish community in the region and its survival demonstrates the ongoing public interest and connection to the place.

Of the three dedicated Jewish cemeteries established in NSW, Maitland Jewish Cemetery is a rare surviving example that demonstrates the traditions and rituals of life and death in the Jewish faith. The location of the cemetery, the positioning of the grave sites and the form, design and style of the monuments demonstrate the community's adherence to their faith and the importance of observing traditions when laying their dead to rest.

Maitland Jewish Cemetery was listed on the New South Wales State Heritage Register on 7 March 2014 having satisfied the following criteria.

The place is important in demonstrating the course, or pattern, of cultural or natural history in New South Wales.

Maitland Jewish Cemetery is of state heritage significance as the earliest and largest dedicated Jewish cemetery in NSW. Established in 1846, the cemetery contains 53 burial sites and, with 46 headstone monuments remaining on site, it is the most intact of the three dedicated Jewish cemeteries in NSW.

The early establishment of a dedicated burial ground is a tradition of the Orthodox Jewish faith and the Maitland Jewish Cemetery played an important part in the development of the Jewish community in the region. The location of the cemetery, positioning of the grave sites and the design and ornamentation of the headstones also reflects the traditions of the Orthodox Jewish faith and the community's commitment to their religion.

The place has a strong or special association with a person, or group of persons, of importance of cultural or natural history of New South Wales's history.

The Maitland Jewish Cemetery has a particular association with the prominent Jewish settlers of the Hunter Valley region. At the core of the Jewish community of the Maitland area in the mid-19th century were a number of wealthy and influential Jewish businessmen who played an important role in the development of the region. The prominence of these particular people is reflected in the early establishment of a dedicated Jewish cemetery and associated synagogue in the region.

The place is important in demonstrating aesthetic characteristics and/or a high degree of creative or technical achievement in New South Wales.

Positioned in a rural landscape on the outskirts of the town, the Maitland Jewish Cemetery is a small regional burial ground that reflects the traditions of the Orthodox Jewish faith. A discreetly located site, the cemetery contains a number of modest monuments that demonstrates "that, in death, all are equal and ostentation is out of place". The layout, monument form and ornamentation suggest a deliberate observance to the traditions of the Orthodox Jewish faith.

The place has strong or special association with a particular community or cultural group in New South Wales for social, cultural or spiritual reasons.

Maitland Jewish Cemetery is of state heritage significance for its social value to the Jewish community of Maitland as well as its broader connection to the Jewish community of NSW. Cemeteries demonstrate the rituals of life and death and reflect how a community manages its grief. Furthermore, the importance of a dedicated Jewish cemetery to the broader Jewish community is reflected in its use by the people of Maitland as well as those from afar who were interred at the site.

The cemetery is a physical record of the Jewish community in the region and its survival demonstrates the ongoing public interest and connection to the place. This contemporary social value is demonstrated by the establishment of the Friends of the Maitland Jewish Cemetery to maintain the site and the ongoing release of research and written material about the history of the cemetery.

The place has potential to yield information that will contribute to an understanding of the cultural or natural history of New South Wales.

Maitland Jewish Cemetery has some potential to reveal further information about the traditional burial practices and rituals of the Orthodox Jewish faith in NSW in the mid-19th century. Although the remaining monuments are in a varying state of repair, further analysis of their form, design style and use of liturgical symbolism could provide further insight into how death was celebrated by the Orthodox Jewish faith.

Cemeteries are also a valuable genealogical resource and provide evidence of the social history of the Jewish faith in the Hunter Valley region.

There is some potential that the archaeological remains of the cottage building could be investigated further. The likely position of the building in the south western corner is evident but no formal archaeological investigation of the site has been undertaken.

The place possesses uncommon, rare or endangered aspects of the cultural or natural history of New South Wales.

Maitland Jewish Cemetery is of state heritage significance as a rare example of a dedicated Jewish burial ground in NSW. Many multi-denominational cemeteries contain Jewish sections but only three dedicated Jewish cemeteries have ever been established in NSW – Maitland in 1846, Goulburn Jewish Cemetery in 1848 and Raphael's Ground in Lidcombe in 1867. Of the three cemeteries, only those at Maitland and Goulburn remain today. (Raphael's Ground was disbanded and monuments relocated to Rookwood Cemetery in 1970.)

As the largest and most intact of the two Jewish cemeteries in NSW (Maitland contains 53 grave sites and 46 headstones while Goulburn has 35 burials and retains only 11 headstones), Maitland Jewish Cemetery has state heritage significance for its rarity value.

The place is important in demonstrating the principal characteristics of a class of cultural or natural places/environments in New South Wales.

Maitland Jewish Cemetery is a representative example of a small regional burial ground that reflects the traditional burial rites and rituals of a religious faith. The design and form of the monuments reflect the masonry practices of the late 19th and early 20th centuries and the liturgical inscriptions demonstrate the traditional symbolism of the Jewish faith.

== See also ==
- History of the Jews in Australia
- List of synagogues in Australia and New Zealand
- Maitland Synagogue
