= Myles McRae =

Australian politician

Myles McRae (1845 – 13 April 1926) was an Australian politician.

He was born at Dunmore on the Hunter River to farmer Alexander McRae and Mary McInnes. He was a businessman in Morpeth, and later a land speculator in Sydney. In 1871 he married Clara Charlotte Taylor, with whom he had four children. In 1889 he was elected to the New South Wales Legislative Assembly as the Protectionist member for Morpeth, but he did not contest the 1891 election. McRae died at Penshurst in 1926.

New South Wales Legislative Assembly
Preceded by John Bowes	Member for Morpeth; 1889–1891	Succeeded by John Bowes
