= David Cohen & Co. Warehouse =

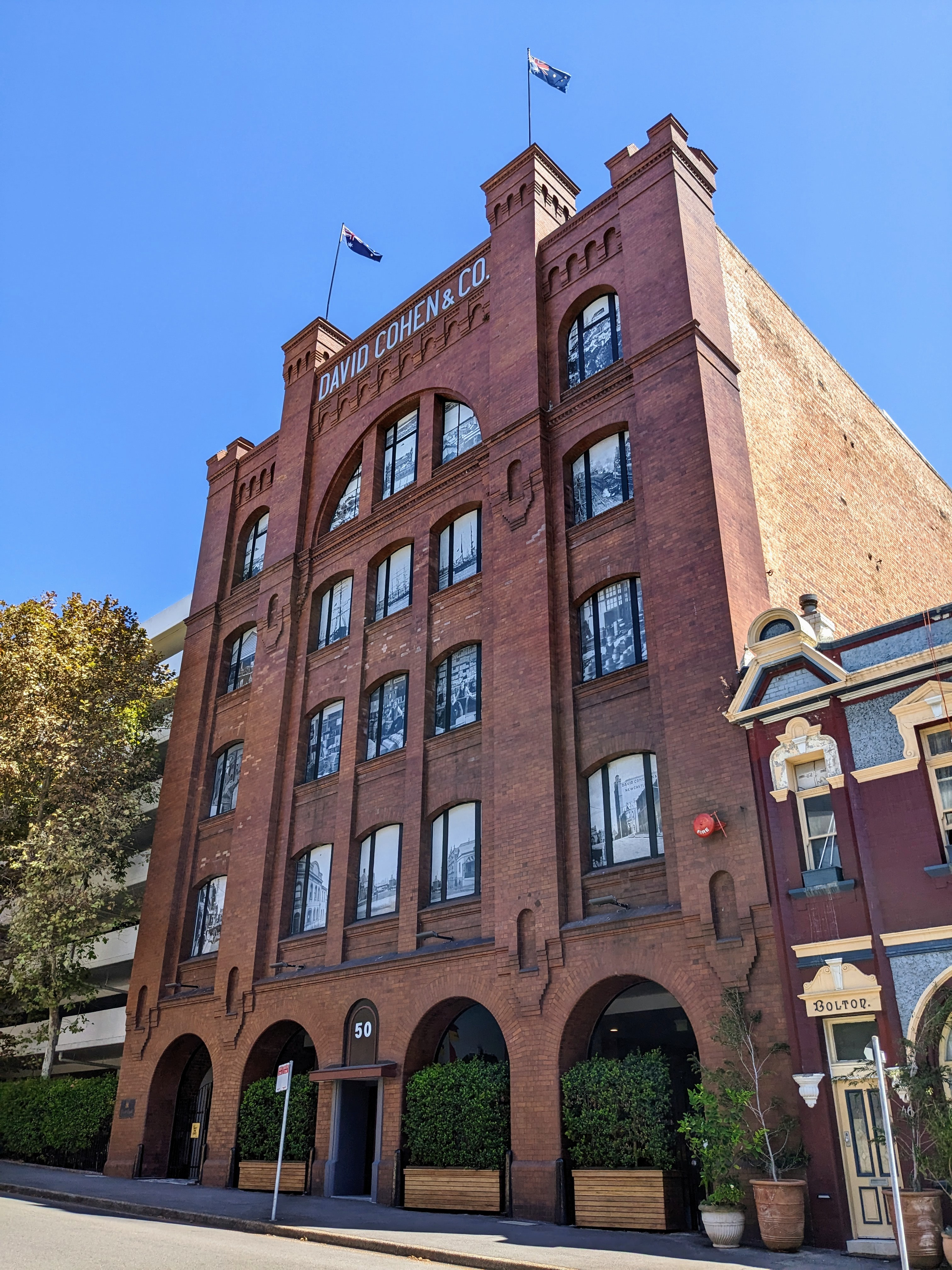

- Location within New South Wales Location within Australia
- 32.9288°S 151.7824°E
- Location: 48–50 Bolton Street, Newcastle, City of Newcastle, New South Wales, Australia

History
- Built: 1901

Site notes
- Architect: Frederick B. Menckens
- Owner: Newcastle City Council

New South Wales Heritage Register
- Official name: Bolton Street Car Park Facade & Side Wall; David Cohen Warehouse
- Type: state heritage (built)
- Designated: 2 April 1999
- Reference no.: 66
- Type: Warehouse/storage area
- Category: Commercial

David Cohen & Co. Warehouse is a heritage-listed facade and side wall from a former warehouse at 48–50 Bolton Street in the Newcastle Central Business District, New South Wales, Australia. It was designed by Frederick B. Menckens and built from 1901. It now forms part of the Bolton Street Car Park. It was added to the New South Wales State Heritage Register on 2 April 1999.

== History ==
This building was designed by Menkens after his release from debtors' prison. It was built for David Cohen as a shipping warehouse and converted to a parking station by Newcastle Council with the demolition of all but the facade and side wall in 1983. Architects Suters Busteed Corner Clode were the architectural team responsible for the conversion. It was slated for demolition until the NSW Government protected it with the imposition of a Permanent Conservation Order in 1981, transposed to a listing on the State Heritage Register in 1999.

Darren Nicholson purchased the car park complex from Newcastle City Council in 2013 and restored the brickwork of the facade. Nicholson proposed to redevelop the site, which has not occurred as of 2018.

== Description ==
The former David Cohen & Co. Warehouse consists of a five-storey dark red brick facade of interwar art deco/functionalist ocean liner style, following Newcastle City Council's demolition of the remainder of the building to build a car park in the early 1980s.

Architecture Newcastle describes the building as "a monochromatic, dark red facade and brickwork masterpiece." The building is 5 storeys high of brick load bearing construction finely executed in the Federation Warehouse style. The main facade is finished entirely in face brickwork and detailed to form arched openings and massive corbelled piers. Detail is related to the brick units themselves, as opposed to any classical detailing. The composition is based on a tripartite group of openings vertically and horizontally, and a vertically emphasised proportion. The arches are elegant and complete the vertical composition of the openings. The building's parapet features splendidly detailed brick caps and cornice.

The warehouse was constructed from load bearing brick walls with ironbark timber post and beam framings internally. The main facade is finished entirely in face brickwork, detailed to form arched openings and massive corbelled piers. The facade is of great strength which is almost fortress like in its monumentality, with a basically vertical fenestration of piers, windows and recesses. The facade is relieved by two narrow cornices at first and fourth floor levels.

The building has important historical associations with David Cohen and the pre-eminent 19th century architect Frederick B. Menkens. The building has been described as the best example of Menkens' work in Australia. The building makes an important contribution to the streetscape and is a visually significant element of the Newcastle skyline, particularly when viewed from the foreshore, Fort Scratchley and other parts of the city centre. The National Trust of Australia described it as one of the best examples of a Federation era warehouse building to be found anywhere in Australia. The building became the benchmark for many local builders constructing in brickwork at the turn of the century.

The building is regarded as Newcastle architect, Frederick Menkens' finest commercial essay in brick design in the Functionalist tradition. The building is a fitting reminder of the once bustling warehouse and shipping office quarter of Newcastle.

== Heritage listing ==
Bolton Street Car Park was listed on the New South Wales State Heritage Register on 2 April 1999.
