= John Bowes (Australian politician) =

Commercial agent and politician (1843–1897)

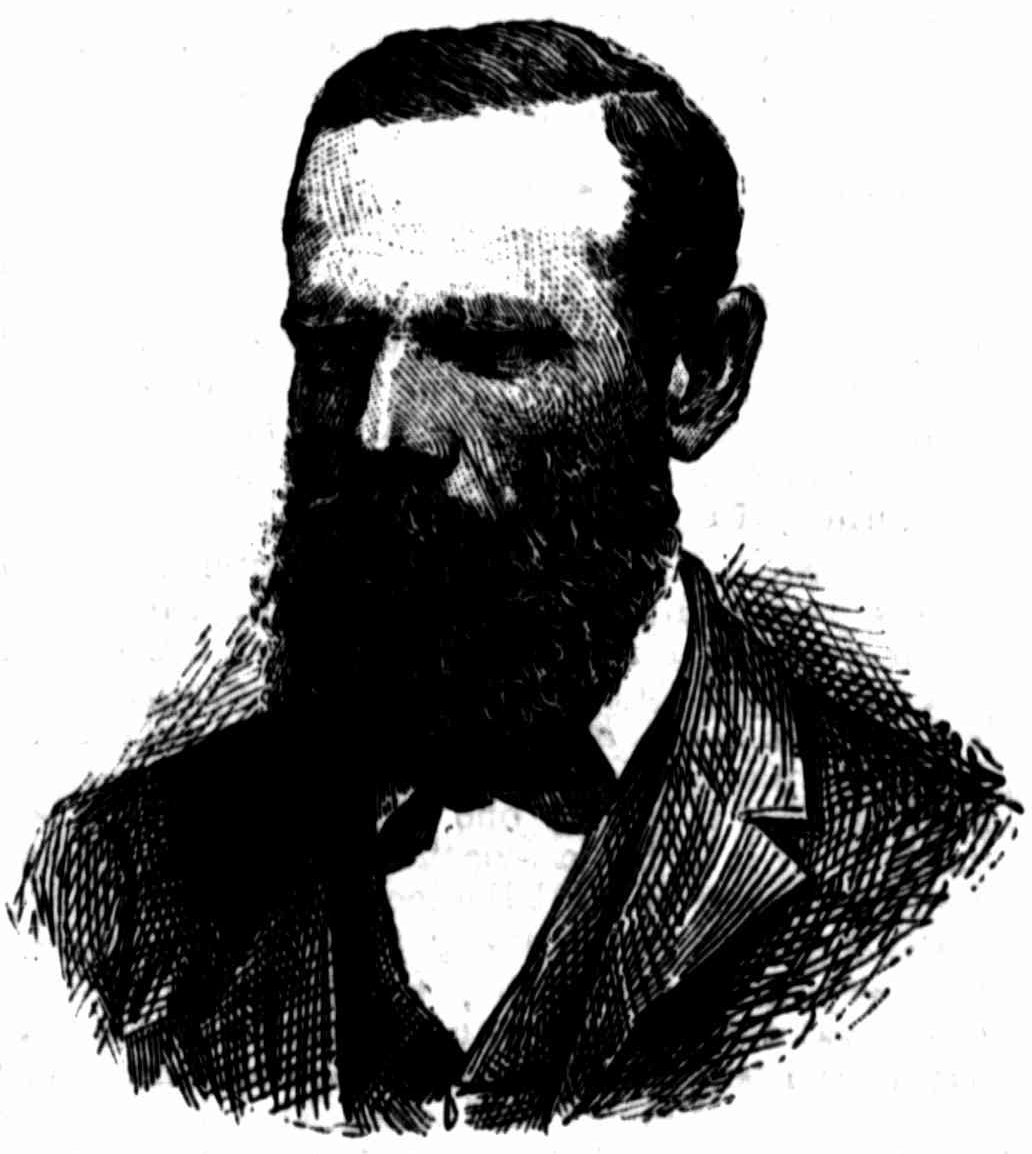
John Wesley Bowes, MLA for Morpeth

John Wesley Bowes (21 July 1843 – 4 February 1897) was an Australian politician.

He was born in Parramatta to baker John Bowes (later a Wesleyan clergyman) and Euphemia Bridges (née Allen), a temperance reformer and suffragette. He was a commercial agent around Morpeth and Tamworth and from 1885 was principal promoter of the Hunter River Farmers' and Consumers' Cooperative Company. He served a period as mayor of Morpeth. On 23 January 1874 he married Emma Jane Young at Kurrajong. In 1887 he was elected to the New South Wales Legislative Assembly as the Protectionist member for Morpeth. Defeated in 1889, he was re-elected in 1891. His seat was abolished in 1894 and he was defeated running for the urban seat of Newtown-St Peters. Bowes died in Sydney in 1897.

New South Wales Legislative Assembly
Preceded by Robert Wisdom	Member for Morpeth; 1887–1889	Succeeded by Myles McRae
Preceded by Myles McRae	Member for Morpeth; 1891–1894	District abolished
