= James Campbell (New South Wales politician) =

Australian politician

James Campbell (1820 – 30 September 1879) was an Irish-born Australian politician.

== Biography ==
He was the son of farmers David and Dorothy Campbell, and migrated to New South Wales in 1845. He had married Eliza Jane Nunn on the Isle of Man; they had one child. He set up a store at Morpeth. In 1858 he moved to Sydney to partner in a merchant house. In 1864 he was elected to the New South Wales Legislative Assembly for Morpeth, serving until his retirement in 1874. Campbell died at Robertson in 1879. Elected as a Councillor in 1866 for Waverley Ward on the Waverley Municipal Council, and serving until 1870 as an Alderman, Campbell lived in Waverley in his later years and was buried in Waverley Cemetery.

New South Wales Legislative Assembly
| Preceded by Edward Close | Member for Morpeth; 1864–1874 | Succeeded by Robert Wisdom |
