= Samuel Cohen (New South Wales politician) =

Australian politician

The Honourable Samuel Cohen
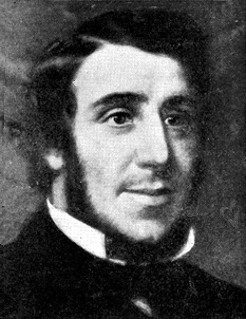
- Hon. Samuel Cohen
- Born: 14 July 1812; Lambeth, England
- Died: 4 November 1861 (aged 49); Sydney, Australia
- Occupation: Merchant
- Known for: Member of New South Wales Legislative Assembly (MLA)

The Hon. Samuel Cohen (14 July 1812 – 4 November 1861) was a 19th-century Australian colonial politician and businessman.

Born at Lambeth, Surrey, of Jewish ancestry, to merchant Barnett Cohen (1779–1856) and his wife Sierlah née Levy (1788–1854), he emigrated to Australia, arriving in Sydney on 19 April 1834, aboard the Resource. Cohen had been sent by his father to escort his brothers, David and Lewis, back to England, but was unsuccessful in doing so.

== Business Interests ==
From 1835 Cohen lived at Maitland, and partnered with Lewis Levy, who later also entered politics.

In 1836 he co-founded a general merchants company with his brother David, operating out of Sydney and Newcastle in New South Wales.

== Politics ==
In 1860 Cohen was elected to the New South Wales Legislative Assembly for Morpeth in a by-election, but he was defeated at the general election later that year.

== Personal life ==
On 23 August 1837 Cohen married Rachel Nathan (1813–1893), having seven children, of whom the eldest Sarah Mandelson (1839–1894) was great-great-grandmother of New Labour grandee, Peter Mandelson.

Samuel Cohen died suddenly, in Sydney, on 4 November 1861. The Empire reported that "the mournful cortege consisted of a hearse, fourteen mourning coaches, and seventy-two carriages... As the funeral passed through the different streets, large numbers of spectators assembled to witness it; thus showing the general esteem in which the deceased gentleman was held by all sections of the community."

Cohen's widow returned to London, dying at Kensington on 26 October 1893.

== See also ==
- Cintra House

New South Wales Legislative Assembly
Preceded by Edward Close	Member for Morpeth; 1860	Succeeded by David Buchanan
