= Edward Close Jr. =

Pastoralist and politician from New South Wales, Australia

Edward Charles Close (21 January 1825 – 19 February 1887) was an Australian politician.

He was born at Morpeth to Sophia Susannah Palmer and Edward Charles Close, who was a British soldier and member of the New South Wales Legislative Council. On 2 January 1837 he laid the foundation stones of St James's Church of England in Morpeth. He was a pastoralist and landowner and on 24 July 1847 married Louisa Slade Platt, with whom he had four children.

In 1859 he was elected to the New South Wales Legislative Assembly for Morpeth, but resigned in 1860, later stating that he did so because it had been a lengthy session of parliament, marked by a power struggle among Charles Cowper, William Forster and John Robertson during which nothing was done. He successfully contested the Morpeth by-election in 1862 before retiring again in 1864.

Close died at St Leonards on 19 February 1887 (aged 62).

New South Wales Legislative Assembly
New seat	Member for Morpeth; 1859–1860	Succeeded by Samuel Cohen
Preceded by David Buchanan	Member for Morpeth; 1862–1864	Succeeded by James Campbell
