= Maitland Synagogue =

Maitland Synagogue (former)
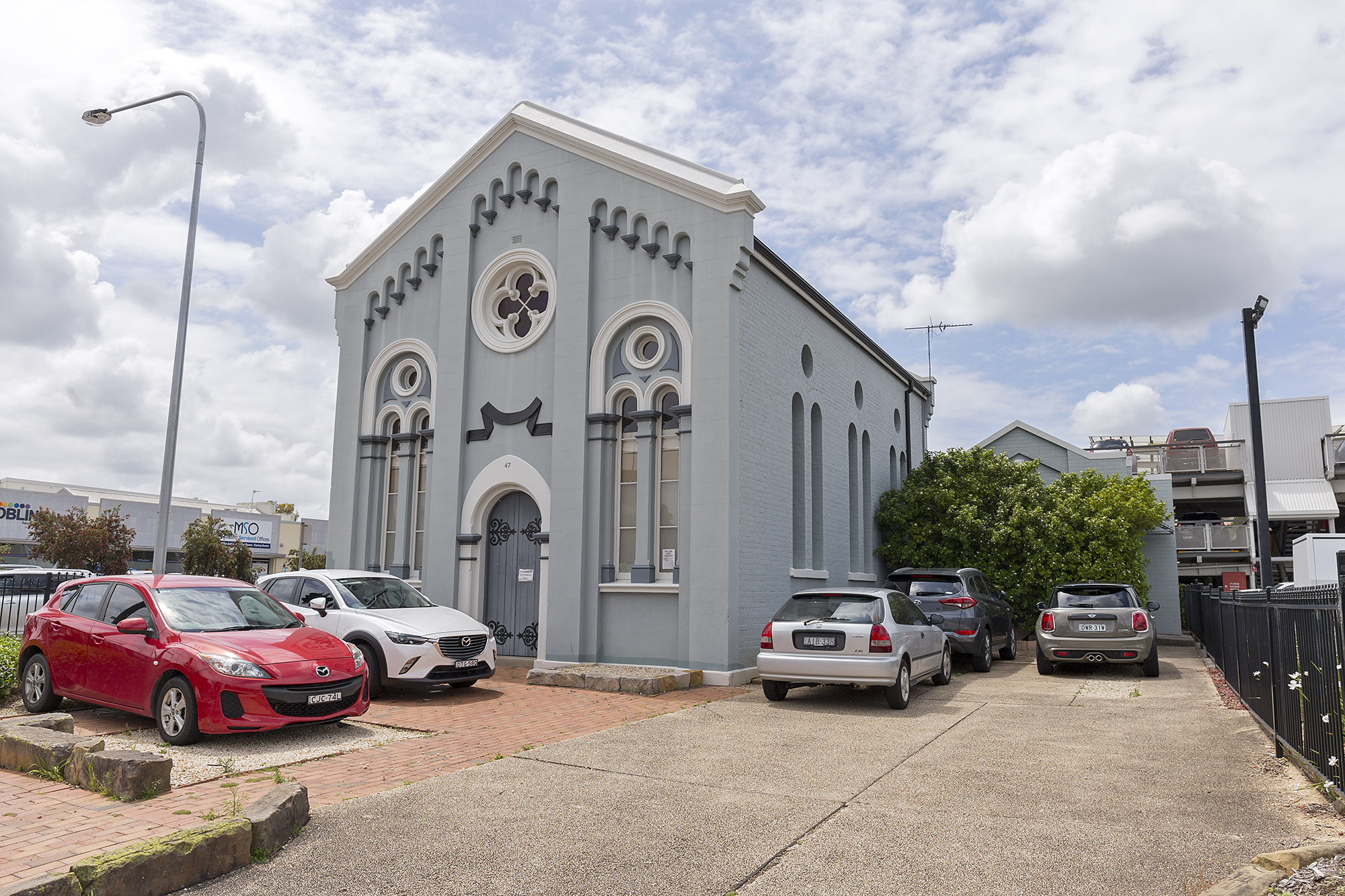
- Former synagogue in Maitland, 2018

- Location in New South Wales

Religion
- Affiliation: Judaism
- Ecclesiastical or organisational status: Closed
- Year consecrated: 1879
- Status: Commercial use(s)

Location
- Location: 47 Church Street, Maitland, City of Maitland, New South Wales
- Country: Australia
- Coordinates: 32.7340°S 151.5532°E

Architecture
- Architect: John W. Pender
- Type: Synagogue
- Style: Romanesque Revival style
- Groundbreaking: 24 February 1879
- Completed: 1879; 147 years ago
- New South Wales Heritage Register
- Official name: Maitland Synagogue (former); Synagogue; The Old Synagogue
- Type: State heritage (built)
- Designated: 2 April 1999
- Reference no.: 376
- Type: Synagogue
- Category: Religion
- Builders: James Pritchard

The Maitland Synagogue is a heritage-listed former synagogue located at 47 Church Street, Maitland, in the City of Maitland local government area of New South Wales, Australia. It was designed by John W. Pender and built in 1879 by James Pritchard. It is also known as The Old Synagogue. It was added to the New South Wales State Heritage Register on 2 April 1999.

== History ==
For at least the first half of the 150-year history of Maitland, the Jewish community provided a strong contribution to the development of the district. As the number of Jewish settlers increased it was decided to build a synagogue, and land was purchased in Church Street.

J. W. Pender prepared alternative designs for the synagogue in 1878, and the present building was the less elaborate and probably the less expensive of the two. John Pender was the founder of the architectural practice known as Pender & Associates.

The foundation stone was laid by Lewis W. Levy on 24 February 1879, when Morris Benjamin was president of the congregation. The building was constructed in 1879 by James Pritchard to meet the needs of the then substantial Jewish community.

The synagogue was consecrated on 7 September 1879 by the Rev. A. B. Davis of the Great Synagogue, together with the Rev. S. A. Goldstein, Maitland's Minister. However, during the 1890s depression, the Jewish community declined in numbers to the point when in 1898, the synagogue was finally closed.

When it ceased to operate as a synagogue, the building became a private school, and then a Masonic lodge. Circa 1936 the original flooring was replaced with narrow, secret-nailed boards more suitable for dancing than the original wide, shot-edge boards and was used during World War II as a dance hall to entertain soldiers. About this time the gallery and the Ark were demolished.

In 1946 a large opening was made in the east wall and timber-framed galvanised iron additions were made to the east and south sides.

The building was later used as a motor vehicle repair shop.

In 1981 a s.130 Order was placed over the building as a result of its poor condition and the possibility of demolition. In 1983 an Interim Conservation Order was placed over the building. The then owners of the property advised that they wished to demolish the building in order to redevelop the site. The building was not considered beyond restoration and was in a good position for a sympathetic use. In 1985 a Permanent Conservation Order was placed over the building.

In 1986 the building was converted into a credit union. In 2018, it houses a provider of occupational medicine services.

The Maitland Jewish Cemetery is also listed on the New South Wales State Heritage Register.

== Description ==
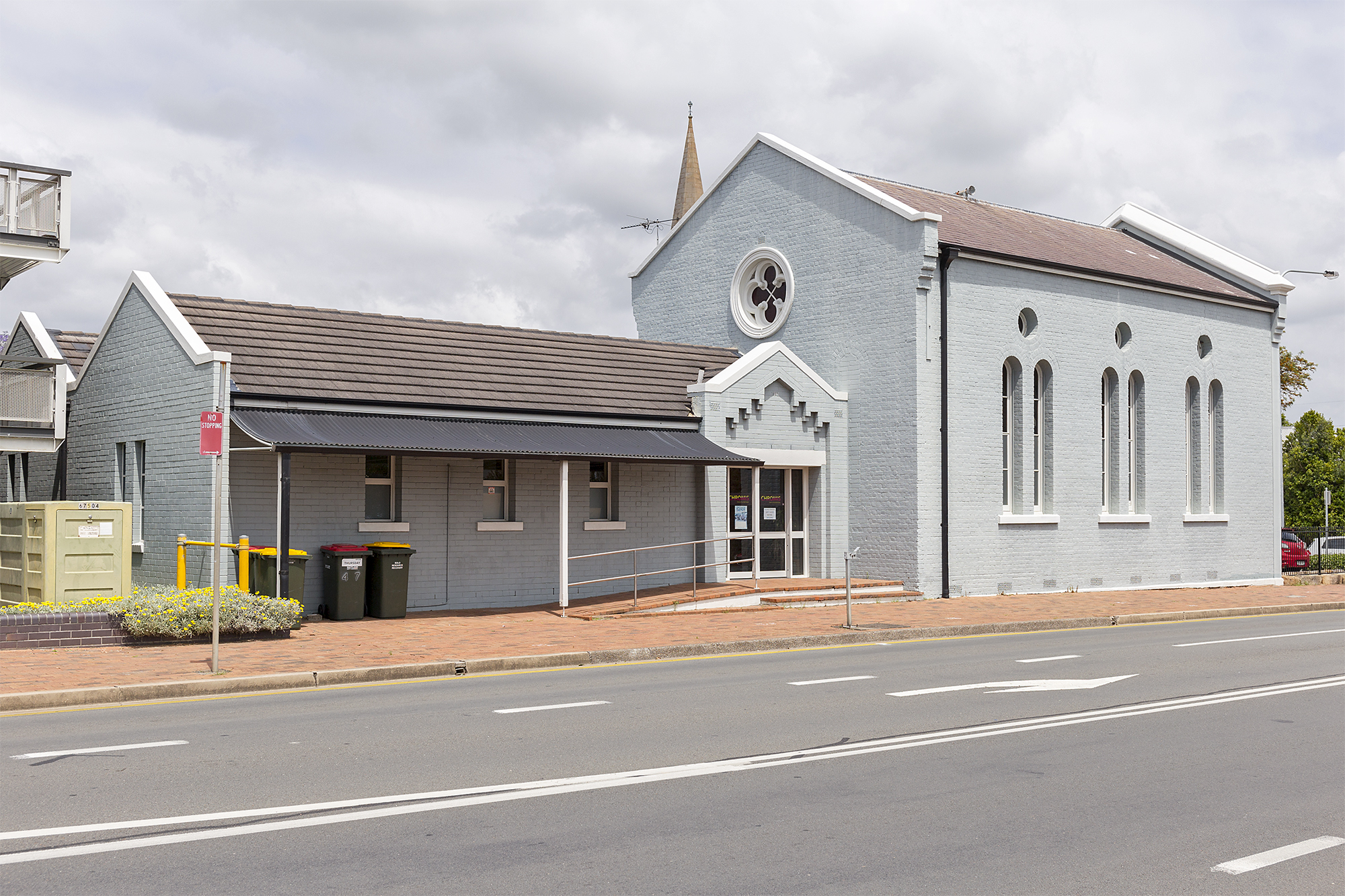
Side view, 2018

The building is a small symmetrical solid brick structure with slate roof and high elliptical lath and plaster ceiling. It was designed in the Romanesque Revival style and displays elaborate cement-rendered details, including corbelled arcades and columns, quatrefoil windows and round-headed arches. The interior retains its original cedar windows which are still in good condition, although parts of the walls have been altered by successive owners. It is approximately 8 by 13 metres (26 by 43 ft) in size.

It was reported to be in good physical condition as at 15 October 1999.

== Heritage listing ==
The Maitland Synagogue is of historic significance in its associations with the strong Jewish community in the area and their contribution to the success and importance of Maitland as a trading centre in the latter half of the 19th century.

Maitland Synagogue was listed on the New South Wales State Heritage Register on 2 April 1999 having satisfied the following criteria.

The place is important in demonstrating the course, or pattern, of cultural or natural history in New South Wales.

Much of the success and importance of Maitland as a trading centre in the latter half of the 19th century can be attributed to the strong Jewish community. The Maitland Synagogue was built two years after the erection of the Great Synagogue in Sydney and is the oldest surviving example outside Sydney of the very few synagogues built within New South Wales.

The place is important in demonstrating aesthetic characteristics and/or a high degree of creative or technical achievement in New South Wales.

The synagogue is an important element in the streetscape of Church Street, complementing other heritage items including Grossman House, Brough House and the splendid Blacket Church, St Mary's the Virgin Anglican Church and its Rectory.

== See also ==
- History of the Jews in Australia
- List of synagogues in Australia
- Maitland Jewish Cemetery
