= Electoral district of Morpeth =

Former state electoral district of New South Wales, Australia

Morpeth was an electoral district of the Legislative Assembly in the Australian state of New South Wales, created in 1859 and partly replacing Northumberland Boroughs and including the suburb of Morpeth in the city of Maitland. The Morpeth electoral district was abolished in 1894, and divided between Gloucester, Durham and East Maitland.

== Members for Morpeth ==
| Member | Party | Period |
|---|---|---|
| Edward Close | None | 1859–1860 |
| Samuel Cohen | None | 1860–1860 |
| David Buchanan | None | 1860–1862 |
| Edward Close | None | 1862–1864 |
| James Campbell | None | 1864–1874 |
| Robert Wisdom | None | 1874–1887 |
| John Bowes | Protectionist | 1887–1889 |
| Myles McRae | Protectionist | 1889–1891 |
| John Bowes | Protectionist | 1891–1894 |

== Election results ==
1891 New South Wales colonial election: Morpeth Wednesday 17 June
| Party | Candidate | Votes | % | ±% |
|---|---|---|---|---|
| Protectionist | John Bowes (elected) | 509 | 53.6 | |
| Free Trade | William Arnold | 357 | 37.6 | |
| Protectionist | John Courtney | 50 | 5.3 | |
| Free Trade | Malcolm Martin | 33 | 3.5 | |
| Total formal votes | | 949 | 98.4 | |
| Informal votes | | 15 | 1.6 | |
| Turnout | | 964 | 75.4 | |
| Protectionist hold | | | | |
