= Electoral results for the district of West Sydney =

Results for state seat of West Sydney, New South Wales, Australia

West Sydney, an electoral district of the Legislative Assembly in the Australian state of New South Wales was created in 1859 and abolished in 1894.

Election	Member	Party	Member	Party	Member	Party	Member	Party
1859	John Lang	None	James Pemell	None	John Plunkett	None	Thomas Broughton	None
1860	John Lang	None	William Windeyer	None	Daniel Dalgleish	None	William Love	None
Jan 1863 by	John Lang	None	Geoffrey Eagar	None	Daniel Dalgleish	None	William Love	None
Oct 1863 by	John Lang	None	Geoffrey Eagar	None	Daniel Dalgleish	None	William Love	None
1864	John Lang	None	John Darvall	None	John Robertson	None	Samuel Joseph	None
Feb 1865 by	John Lang	None	John Darvall	None	John Robertson	None	Samuel Joseph	None
Jul 1865 by	John Lang	None	Geoffrey Eagar	None	John Robertson	None	Samuel Joseph	None
Oct 1865 by	John Lang	None	Geoffrey Eagar	None	John Robertson	None	Samuel Joseph	None
1866 by	John Lang	None	Geoffrey Eagar	None	William Windeyer	None	Samuel Joseph	None
1868 by	John Lang	None	Geoffrey Eagar	None	William Windeyer	None	William Campbell	None
1869	William Speer	None	John Robertson	None	William Windeyer	None	Joseph Wearne	None
Mar 1870 by	William Speer	None	John Robertson	None	William Windeyer	None	Joseph Wearne	None
Dec 1870 by	William Speer	None	John Robertson	None	William Windeyer	None	Joseph Wearne	None
1872	Joseph Raphael	None	John Robertson	None	John Booth	None	Joseph Wearne	None
1874	Henry Dangar	None	John Robertson	None	Angus Cameron	None	George Dibbs	None
1877 by	Henry Dangar	None	John Robertson	None	Angus Cameron	None	George Dibbs	None
1877	John Harris	None	Daniel O'Connor	None	Angus Cameron	None	James Merriman	None
1880	William Martin	None	Daniel O'Connor	None	Angus Cameron	None	Francis Abigail	None
1882	George Merriman	None	Daniel O'Connor	None	Angus Cameron	None	Francis Abigail	None
1885	John Young	None	Daniel O'Connor	None	Alexander Kethel	None	Francis Abigail	None
1887	George Merriman	Free Trade	Daniel O'Connor	Free Trade	Alexander Kethel	Free Trade	Francis Abigail	Free Trade
1889	Alfred Lamb	Free Trade	Daniel O'Connor	Free Trade	Thomas Playfair	Free Trade	Francis Abigail	Free Trade
1890 by	Adolphus Taylor	Independent	Daniel O'Connor	Free Trade	Thomas Playfair	Free Trade	Francis Abigail	Free Trade
1891	Thomas Davis	Labor	George Black	Labor	Andrew Kelly	Labor	Jack FitzGerald	Labor

== Election results ==
=== Elections in the 1890s ===
==== 1891 ====
1891 New South Wales colonial election: West Sydney Wednesday 17 June
Party	Candidate	Votes	%	±%
Labour	Jack FitzGerald (elected 1)	4,174	15.8	
Labour	George Black (elected 2)	4,078	15.4	
Labour	Andrew Kelly (elected 3)	3,798	14.3	
Labour	Thomas Davis (elected 4)	2,730	10.3	
Protectionist	John Young	2,601	9.8	
Free Trade	Thomas Playfair (defeated)	2,535	9.6	
Free Trade	Daniel O'Connor (defeated)	2,493	9.4	
Free Trade	Francis Abigail (defeated)	2,326	8.8	
Free Trade	Frederick Woolcott-Waley	1,745	6.6	
Total formal votes		26,480	99.8	
Informal votes		66	0.3	
Turnout		7,428	68.6	
Labour gain 3 from Free Trade and gain 1 from Independent				

Adolphus Taylor (Independent) did not contest the election.

==== 1890 by-election ====
1890 West Sydney by-election Wednesday 25 October
Party	Candidate	Votes	%	±%
Independent	Adolphus Taylor (elected)	3,455	63.8	
Free Trade	John Taylor	1,963	36.2	
Total formal votes		5,418	97.9	
Informal votes		116	2.1	
Turnout		5,534	51.2	
Independent gain from Free Trade				

Alfred Lamb (Free Trade) died.

=== Elections in the 1880s ===
==== 1889 ====
1889 New South Wales colonial election: West Sydney Saturday 2 February
Party	Candidate	Votes	%	±%
Free Trade	Thomas Playfair (elected 1)	3,896	15.5	
Free Trade	Daniel O'Connor (elected 2)	3,697	14.7	
Free Trade	Francis Abigail (elected 3)	3,678	14.6	
Free Trade	Alfred Lamb (elected 4)	3,552	14.1	
Protectionist	John Young	2,788	11.1	
Protectionist	Arthur Nelson	2,566	10.2	
Protectionist	Francis Freehill	2,549	10.1	
Protectionist	John Wearne	2,416	9.6	
Total formal votes		25,142	99.8	
Informal votes		47	0.2	
Turnout		6,977	61.2	
Free Trade hold 4				

==== 1887 ====
1887 New South Wales colonial election: West Sydney Saturday 5 February
Party	Candidate	Votes	%	±%
Free Trade	Francis Abigail (re-elected 1)	3,688	19.9	
Free Trade	Alexander Kethel (re-elected 2)	3,450	18.6	
Free Trade	George Merriman (elected 3)	3,049	16.4	
Free Trade	Daniel O'Connor (re-elected 4)	2,988	16.1	
Protectionist	John Young (defeated)	2,246	12.1	
Protectionist	Arthur Nelson	1,212	6.5	
Protectionist	William Westman	977	5.3	
Free Trade	William Pritchard	972	5.2	
Total formal votes		18,582	99.0	
Informal votes		189	1.0	
Turnout		7,429	64.5	

==== 1885 ====
1885 New South Wales colonial election: West Sydney Friday 16 October
Candidate	Votes	%
Alexander Kethel (elected 1)	3,515	21.0
Daniel O'Connor (re-elected 2)	3,057	18.3
Francis Abigail (re-elected 3)	3,043	18.2
John Young (elected 4)	2,870	17.2
Angus Cameron (defeated)	2,388	14.3
George Merriman (defeated)	1,853	11.1
Total formal votes	16,726	99.2
Informal votes	140	0.8
Turnout	7,140	68.4

==== 1882 ====
1882 New South Wales colonial election: West Sydney Tuesday 5 December
Candidate	Votes	%
Daniel O'Connor (re-elected 1)	2,967	20.7
George Merriman (elected 2)	2,519	17.5
Francis Abigail (re-elected 3)	2,340	16.3
Angus Cameron (re-elected 4)	2,176	15.2
William Martin (defeated)	2,070	14.4
Edward O'Sullivan	1,627	11.3
Charles Pilcher (defeated)	362	2.5
Jeremiah Murphy	306	2.1
Total formal votes	14,367	98.9
Informal votes	166	1.1
Turnout	5,416	58.1

==== 1880 ====
1880 New South Wales colonial election: West Sydney Monday 22 November
Candidate	Votes	%
Angus Cameron (re-elected 1)	3,070	18.5
Daniel O'Connor (re-elected 2)	2,687	16.2
Francis Abigail (elected 3)	2,226	13.4
William Martin (elected 4)	2,206	13.3
John Harris (defeated)	2,033	12.2
Thomas White	1,197	7.2
Charles Roberts	1,109	6.7
David Buchanan	999	6.0
John Harris Snr	571	3.4
William Roylance	511	3.1
Total formal votes	16,609	98.7
Informal votes	216	1.3
Turnout	5,858	66.0

The other sitting member James Merriman did not contest the election. David Buchanan was the sitting member for Mudgee and subsequently regained a seat in that district.

=== Elections in the 1870s ===
==== 1877 ====
1877 New South Wales colonial election: West Sydney Thursday 25 October
Candidate	Votes	%
James Merriman (elected 1)	2,929	15.9
Angus Cameron (re-elected 2)	2,373	12.9
Daniel O'Connor (elected 3)	2,249	12.2
John Harris (elected 4)	2,117	11.5
Henry Dangar (defeated)	2,010	10.9
Sir John Robertson (defeated)	1,892	10.3
Thomas White	1,602	8.7
George Dibbs (defeated)	1,394	7.6
Jacob Garrard	675	3.7
Benjamin Palmer	627	3.4
Joseph O'Connor	404	2.2
Archibald Hamilton	111	0.6
Henry Fisher	74	0.4
Total formal votes	18,457	100.0
Informal votes	0	0.0
Turnout	6,542	64.8

==== 1877 by-election ====
1877 West Sydney by-election Monday 27 August
Candidate	Votes	%
Sir John Robertson (re-elected)	1,703	54.6
Thomas White	1,414	45.4
Total formal votes	3,117	97.0
Informal votes	97	3.0
Turnout	3,214	31.8 (Note: estimate based on an electoral roll of 10,097 at October 1877.)

Sir John Robertson was appointed Colonial Secretary forming the fourth Robertson ministry.

==== 1874 ====
1874–75 New South Wales colonial election: West Sydney Wednesday 16 December 1874
Candidate	Votes	%
John Robertson (re-elected 1)	2,705	17.6
George Dibbs (elected 2)	2,294	15.0
Henry Dangar (elected 3)	2,207	14.4
Angus Cameron (elected 4)	2,129	13.9
George Thornton	1,888	12.3
Joseph Wearne (defeated)	1,746	11.4
Joseph O'Connor (defeated)	1,659	10.8
Walter Cooper (defeated)	436	2.8
Joseph Raphael (defeated)	267	1.7
Total formal votes	15,331	100.0
Informal votes	0	0.0
Turnout	5,574	63.0

==== 1872 ====
1872 New South Wales colonial election: West Sydney Thursday 15 February
Candidate	Votes	%
Joseph Wearne (re-elected 1)	2,997	20.7
John Booth (elected 2)	2,925	20.2
John Robertson (re-elected 3)	2,058	14.2
Joseph Raphael (elected 4)	1,966	13.6
George Lloyd (defeated)	1,789	12.4
William Windeyer (defeated)	1,512	10.4
Robert Campbell	717	5.0
Samuel Goold	371	2.6
Richard Dransfield	90	0.6
Henry Fisher	64	0.4
Total formal votes	14,489	100.0
Informal votes	0	0.0
Turnout	4,851	53.1

==== December 1870 by-election ====
1870 West Sydney by-election Friday, 30 December
Candidate	Votes	%
John Robertson (re-elected 1)	2,536	38.7
William Windeyer (re-elected 2)	2,393	36.6
Joseph O'Connor	1,617	24.7
Total formal votes	6,546	100.0
Informal votes	0	0.0
Turnout	3,214	34.8

John Robertson was appointed Colonial Secretary and William Windeyer was appointed Solicitor General in the third Martin ministry.

==== March 1870 by-election ====
1870 West Sydney by-election Wednesday 2 March
Candidate	Votes	%
John Robertson (elected)	2,482	57.4
John Stewart	1,832	42.3
Nicholas Eagar	12	0.3
Total formal votes	4,326	100.0
Informal votes	0	0.0
Turnout	4,326	47.7

The by-election was caused by the resignation of John Robertson due to financial difficulties.

=== Elections in the 1860s ===
==== 1869 ====
1869–70 New South Wales colonial election: West Sydney Thursday 9 December 1869
Candidate	Votes	%
Joseph Wearne (elected 1)	2,977	17.8
John Robertson (re-elected 2)	2,829	17.0
William Windeyer (re-elected 3)	2,739	16.4
William Speer (elected 4)	2,664	16.0
William Campbell (defeated)	2,602	15.6
Geoffrey Eagar (defeated)	2,353	14.1
Alexander Richardson	526	3.2
Total formal votes	16,690	100.0
Informal votes	0	0.0
Turnout	5,172	57.1

==== 1868 by-election ====
1868 West Sydney by-election Tuesday 15 December
Candidate	Votes	%
William Campbell (elected)	2,175	52.2
Joseph Wearne	1,982	47.5
Richard Dransfield	13	0.3
Total formal votes	4,170	100.0
Informal votes	0	0.0
Turnout	4,170	48.6

The by-election was caused by the resignation of Samuel Joseph who had traveled to Europe.

==== 1866 by-election ====
1866 West Sydney by-election Wednesday 17 January
Candidate	Votes	%
William Windeyer (elected)	869	52.4
John Robertson (defeated)	789	47.6
Total formal votes	1,658	100.0
Informal votes	0	0.0
Turnout	1,658	21.2

John Robertson was re-appointed Secretary for Lands in the fourth Cowper ministry.

==== October 1865 by-election ====
1865 West Sydney by-election Wednesday 18 October
Candidate	Votes	%
John Robertson (elected)	unopposed	

John Robertson resigned due to financial difficulties.

==== July 1865 by-election ====
1865 West Sydney by-election Friday 7 July
Candidate	Votes	%
Geoffrey Eagar (elected)	1,314	53.8
William Love	1,130	46.2
Total formal votes	2,444	100.0
Informal votes	0	0.0
Turnout	2,444	31.3

John Darvall resigned to return to England.

==== February 1865 by-election ====
1865 West Sydney by-election Saturday 18 February
Candidate	Votes	%
John Robertson (re-elected 1)	1,113	40.2
John Darvall (re-elected 2)	1,033	37.4
Daniel Dalgleish	620	22.4
Total formal votes	2,766	100.0
Informal votes	0	0.0
Turnout	1,383	18.7 (Note: Antony Green's estimate is based on based on each person voting for two candidates. If the 620 people who voted for Dalgleish had plumped for him, as claimed at the declaration of the poll, the turnout would have been around 1,733, 23%.)

John Darvall was appointed Attorney General, and John Robertson was appointed Secretary for Lands in the fourth Cowper ministry.

==== 1864 ====
1864–65 New South Wales colonial election: West Sydney Thursday 24 November 1864
Candidate	Votes	%
John Robertson (re-elected 1)	2,270	18.3
John Lang (re-elected 2)	2,248	18.1
Samuel Joseph (elected 3)	2,183	17.6
John Darvall (re-elected 4)	2,012	16.2
Geoffrey Eagar (defeated)	1,473	11.9
Daniel Dalgleish (defeated)	1,187	9.6
William Love (defeated)	662	5.3
James Murphy	373	3.0
Total formal votes	12,408	100.0
Informal votes	0	0.0
Turnout	4,056	54.9

==== October 1863 by-election ====
October 1863 West Sydney by-election Friday 30 October
Candidate	Votes	%
Geoffrey Eagar (re-elected)	883	95.9
Jabez Bunting	38	4.1
Total formal votes	921	100.0
Informal votes	0	0.0
Turnout	921	12.9

Geoffrey Eagar had been appointed Colonial Treasurer in the first Martin ministry.

==== January 1863 by-election ====
January 1863 West Sydney by-election Thursday 8 January
Candidate	Votes	%
Geoffrey Eagar (elected)	1,315	48.7
William Speer	1,202	44.5
William Moffatt	184	6.8
Total formal votes	2,701	100.0
Informal votes	0	0.0
Turnout	2,701	41.8

William Windeyer resigned.

==== 1860 ====
1860 New South Wales colonial election: West Sydney Wednesday 12 December
Candidate	Votes	%
John Lang (re-elected 1)	1,751	16.4
William Windeyer (re-elected 2)	1,725	16.1
William Love (elected 3)	1,538	14.4
Daniel Dalgleish (elected 4)	1,426	13.3
John Plunkett (defeated)	1,303	12.2
James Martin	1,111	10.4
Robert Tooth	837	7.8
J G White	485	4.5
William Dalley	215	2.0
Thomas Broughton (defeated)	215	2.0
Julius Berncastle	94	0.9
Total formal votes	10,700	100.0
Informal votes	0	0.0
Turnout	3,347	54.1

=== Elections in the 1850s ===
==== 1859 ====
1859 New South Wales colonial election: West Sydney Tuesday 14 June
Candidate	Votes	%
John Lang (elected 1)	2,148	19.7
James Pemell (elected 2)	1,957	17.9
Thomas Broughton (elected 3)	1,799	16.5
John Plunkett (re-elected 4)	1,744	16.0
Robert Stewart	1,668	15.3
Daniel Deniehy (defeated)	1,450	13.3
Thomas Duigan	143	1.3
Total formal votes	10,909	100.0
Informal votes	0	0.0
Turnout	3,661	57.0
