= 1868 West Sydney colonial by-election =

By-election in New South Wales, Australia

A by-election was held for the New South Wales Legislative Assembly electorate of West Sydney on 15 December 1868 because of the resignation of Samuel Joseph, who had traveled to Europe but stayed longer than he had contemplated and so resigned his seat.

== Dates ==
Date	Event
28 November 1868	Samuel Joseph announced his resignation.
1 December 1868	Writ of election issued by the Speaker of the Legislative Assembly.
14 December 1868	Nominations
15 December 1868	Polling day
21 December 1868	Return of writ

== Result ==
1868 West Sydney by-election Tuesday 15 December
Candidate	Votes	%
William Campbell (elected)	2,175	52.2
Joseph Wearne	1,982	47.5
Richard Dransfield	13	0.3
Total formal votes	4,170	100.0
Informal votes	0	0.0
Turnout	4,170	48.6

== See also ==
- Electoral results for the district of West Sydney
- List of New South Wales state by-elections
