= 1866 West Sydney colonial by-election =

By-election in New South Wales, Australia

A by-election was held for the New South Wales Legislative Assembly electorate of West Sydney on 17 January 1866 because John Robertson had been re-appointed Secretary for Lands in the fourth Cowper ministry. Such ministerial by-elections were usually uncontested however on this occasion a poll was required at both West Sydney and The Williams (Marshall Burdekin). Both Robertson and Burdekin were defeated, with the Cowper government falling, replaced by the second Martin ministry.

== Dates ==
Date	Event
1 January 1866	John Robertson re-appointed Secretary for Lands.
9 January 1866	Writ of election issued by the Speaker of the Legislative Assembly.
15 January 1866	Nominations
17 January 1866	Polling day
20 January 1866	Return of writ

== Result ==
1866 West Sydney by-election Wednesday 17 January
Candidate	Votes	%
William Windeyer (elected)	869	52.4
John Robertson (defeated)	789	47.6
Total formal votes	1,658	100.0
Informal votes	0	0.0
Turnout	1,658	21.2

== See also ==
- Electoral results for the district of West Sydney
- List of New South Wales state by-elections
