= January 1863 West Sydney colonial by-election =

By-election in New South Wales, Australia

A by-election was held for the New South Wales Legislative Assembly electorate of West Sydney on 8 January 1863 because William Windeyer resigned. Windeyer was a member of the victorious NSW rifle team which had traveled to Melbourne for a rifle match. They were returning to Sydney on the City of Sydney, an iron steamship, when it struck rocks and sank at Green Cape. While all passengers and crew survived, the Australian Dictionary of Biography states it affected Windeyer's mental and physical health which led to his resignation. Windeyer's letter to the electors of West Sydney refers to the successful passage of the Lands Act, the abolition of state aid to religion, and the pursuit of his profession as a barrister.

== Dates ==
Date	Event
22 December 1862	William Windeyer resigned.
24 December 1862	Writ of election issued by the Speaker of the Legislative Assembly.
6 January 1863	Nominations.
8 January 1863	Polling day
12 January 1863	Return of writ

== Result ==
January 1863 West Sydney by-election Thursday 8 January
Candidate	Votes	%
Geoffrey Eagar (elected)	1,315	48.7
William Speer	1,202	44.5
William Moffatt	184	6.8
Total formal votes	2,701	100.0
Informal votes	0	0.0
Turnout	2,701	41.8

== See also ==
- Electoral results for the district of West Sydney
- List of New South Wales state by-elections
