= 1870 West Sydney colonial by-election =

1870 West Sydney colonial by-election may refer to:

- March 1870 West Sydney colonial by-election
- December 1870 West Sydney colonial by-election

== See also ==
- List of New South Wales state by-elections
