= December 1870 West Sydney colonial by-election =

By-election in New South Wales, Australia

A by-election was held for the New South Wales Legislative Assembly electorate of West Sydney on 30 December 1870 because John Robertson was appointed Colonial Secretary and William Windeyer was appointed Solicitor General in the third Martin ministry. Such ministerial by-elections were usually uncontested and the other ministers were all re-elected unopposed.

== Dates ==
| Date | Event |
|---|---|
| 16 December 1870 | Third Martin ministry appointed. |
| 17 December 1870 | Writ of election issued by the Speaker of the Legislative Assembly. |
| 28 December 1870 | Nominations |
| 30 December 1870 | Polling day |
| 24 January 1871 | Return of writ |

== Result ==
1870 West Sydney by-election Friday, 30 December
| Candidate | Votes | % |
|---|---|---|
| John Robertson (re-elected 1) | 2,536 | 38.7 |
| William Windeyer (re-elected 2) | 2,393 | 36.6 |
| Joseph O'Connor | 1,617 | 24.7 |
| Total formal votes | 6,546 | 100.0 |
| Informal votes | 0 | 0.0 |
| Turnout | 3,214 | 34.8 |

== See also ==
- Electoral results for the district of West Sydney
- List of New South Wales state by-elections
