= 1865 West Sydney colonial by-election =

1865 West Sydney colonial by-election may refer to

- 1865 West Sydney colonial by-election 1 held in February 1865
- 1865 West Sydney colonial by-election 2 held in July 1865
- 1865 West Sydney colonial by-election 3 held in October 1865

== See also ==
- List of New South Wales state by-elections
