= 1890 West Sydney colonial by-election =

By-election in New South Wales, Australia

A by-election was held for the New South Wales Legislative Assembly electorate of West Sydney on 26 July 1890 because of the death of Alfred Lamb (Free Trade).

== Dates ==
Date	Event
13 October 1890	Alfred Lamb died.
16 October 1890	Writ of election issued by the Speaker of the Legislative Assembly.
22 October 1890	Nominations
25 October 1890	Polling day
30 October 1890	Return of writ

== Candidates ==
- Adolphus Taylor was the editor of the Truth and had been the member for Mudgee from 1882 until 1887.
- John Taylor was a timber merchant who had been an alderman on the Sydney City Council since 1877 and before that an alderman and mayor of Balmain Council. He had unsuccessfully stood as a candidate for Balmain at the 1880, and 1882 elections.
- Peter Brennan was the president of the Trades and Labor Council and was its endorsed candidate, however he ultimately did not nominate after some of the maritime unions supported Adolphus Taylor.

== Result ==
1890 West Sydney by-election]] Wednesday 25 October
Party	Candidate	Votes	%	±%
Independent	Adolphus Taylor (elected)	3,455	63.8	
Free Trade	John Taylor	1,963	36.2	
Total formal votes		5,418	97.9	
Informal votes		116	2.1	
Turnout		5,534	51.2	
Independent gain from Free Trade				

== See also ==
- Electoral results for the district of West Sydney
- List of New South Wales state by-elections
