= March 1870 West Sydney colonial by-election =

By-election in New South Wales, Australia

A by-election was held for the New South Wales Legislative Assembly electorate of West Sydney on 2 March 1870 because of the resignation of John Robertson due to financial difficulties.

== Dates ==
Date	Event
22 February 1870	John Robertson resigned.
22 February 1870	Writ of election issued by the Speaker of the Legislative Assembly.
28 February 1870	Nominations
2 March 1870	Polling day
9 March 1870	Return of writ

== Result ==
1870 West Sydney by-election Wednesday 2 March
Candidate	Votes	%
John Robertson (elected)	2,482	57.4
John Stewart	1,832	42.3
Nicholas Eagar	12	0.3
Total formal votes	4,326	100.0
Informal votes	0	0.0
Turnout	4,326	47.7

== See also ==
- Electoral results for the district of West Sydney
- List of New South Wales state by-elections
