= 1863 West Sydney colonial by-election =

1863 West Sydney colonial by-election may refer to

- 1863 West Sydney colonial by-election 1 held on 8 January 1863
- 1863 West Sydney colonial by-election 2 held on 30 October 1863

== See also ==
- List of New South Wales state by-elections
