= October 1865 West Sydney colonial by-election =

By-election in New South Wales, Australia

A by-election was held for the New South Wales Legislative Assembly electorate of West Sydney on 18 October 1865 because of the resignation of John Robertson due to financial difficulties.

== Dates ==
Date	Event
10 October 1865	John Robertson resigned.
11 October 1865	Writ of election issued by the Speaker of the Legislative Assembly.
18 October 1865	Nominations
20 October 1865	Polling day
24 October 1865	Return of writ

== Result ==
1865 West Sydney by-election Wednesday 18 October
Candidate	Votes	%
John Robertson (elected)	unopposed	

== See also ==
- Electoral results for the district of West Sydney
- List of New South Wales state by-elections
