= Martin ministry (1870–1872) =

Third New South Wales government ministry led by James Martin

Third Martin ministry
- 13th Cabinet of the Colony of New South Wales

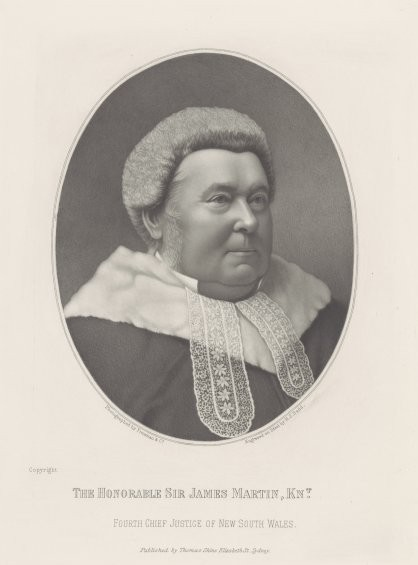
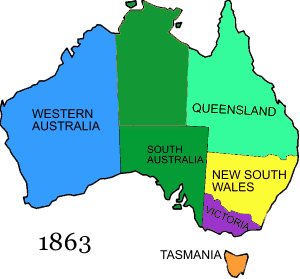
- Premier Sir James Martin and the Colony of New South Wales (1863–1900)
- Date formed: 16 December 1870
- Date dissolved: 13 May 1872

People and organisations
- Monarch: Queen Victoria
- Governor: The Earl Belmore
- Head of government: Sir James Martin
- No. of ministers: 7
- Member party: unaligned
- Status in legislature: Minority government
- Opposition party: unaligned
- Opposition leader: Charles Cowper

History
- Predecessor: Fifth Cowper ministry
- Successor: First Parkes ministry

The third Martin ministry was the thirteenth ministry of the Colony of New South Wales, and the third and final occasion of being led by Sir James Martin.

Martin was elected in the first free elections for the New South Wales Legislative Assembly held in 1856. He came to power as Premier on the first occasion after Charles Cowper's government fell in October 1863. Martin was asked to form government on the second occasion, this time in coalition with his former rival, Henry Parkes, after Cowper again lost the confidence of the Assembly in December 1865. Martin came to power on this occasion, after Cowper again lost confidence of the Assembly.

The title of Premier was widely used to refer to the Leader of Government, but not enshrined in formal use until 1920.

There was no party system in New South Wales politics until 1887. Under the constitution, ministers were required to resign to recontest their seats in a by-election when appointed. A poll was required for West Sydney with Sir John Robertson and William Windeyer comfortably re-elected. The other ministers were all re-elected unopposed.

This ministry covers the period from 16 December 1870 until 13 May 1872, when Martin retired. Upon retirement from politics, he was appointed as Chief Justice of New South Wales.

== Composition of ministry ==
| Portfolio | Minister | Term start | Term end | Term length |
|---|---|---|---|---|
| Premier; Attorney General | Sir James Martin | 16 December 1870 | 13 May 1872 | 1 year, 149 days |
| Colonial Secretary | Sir John Robertson | 16 December 1870 | 13 May 1872 | 1 year, 149 days |
| Colonial Treasurer | George Lord | 16 December 1870 | 13 May 1872 | 1 year, 149 days |
| Secretary for Lands | Bowie Wilson | 16 December 1870 | 13 May 1872 | 1 year, 149 days |
| Secretary for Public Works | James Byrnes | 16 December 1870 | 13 May 1872 | 1 year, 149 days |
| Solicitor General | William Windeyer | 16 December 1870 | 13 May 1872 | 1 year, 149 days |
| Postmaster-General; Representative of the Government in the Legislative Council | Joseph Docker MLC | 16 December 1870 | 13 May 1872 | 1 year, 149 days |

Ministers are members of the Legislative Assembly unless otherwise noted.

== See also ==
- Self-government in New South Wales
- Members of the New South Wales Legislative Assembly, 1869–1872
- Members of the New South Wales Legislative Assembly, 1872–1874
- First Martin ministry (1863–1865)
- Second Martin ministry (1866–1868)

| Preceded by Fifth Cowper ministry | Third Martin ministry 1870–1872 | Succeeded by First Parkes ministry |
