= James Merriman (politician) =

Australian politician

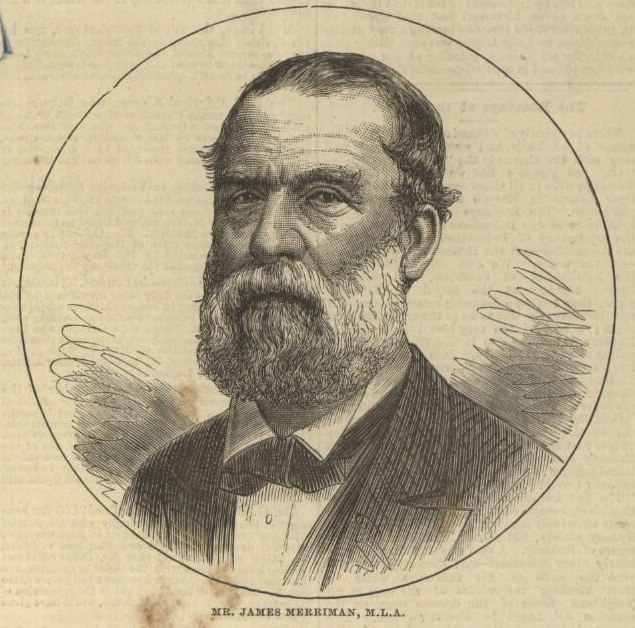
- Born: 23 October 1816
- Died: 13 May 1883 (aged 66); Sydney, Australia
- Occupations: cooper, publican, shipowner, civic leader
- Years active: 1830–1883
- Known for: parliamentarian & three times Lord Mayor of Sydney

James Merriman (23 October 1816 – 13 May 1883) was an Australian cooper, whaler, publican, shipowner, alderman, mayor of Sydney and member of the New South Wales Parliament.

== Biography ==
=== Early years ===
He was born at Parramatta to George and Mary Merriman. His parents died while he was very young and he and his sister Mary were raised by guardians. By 1828 they were lodging with Sydney merchant Joseph Raphael and his wife.

He was indentured as a cooper in the 1830s. He later served as a cooper in charge of the oil casks on whaling vessels for four years.

In 1843, he married Anne Thompson, with whom he had five children. One of them was, George Merriman (1845–1893), who would later serve as a politician, representing West Sydney in the Legislative Assembly from 1882 to 1889.

James’ first venture into business seems to have been as a grocer in York St, Sydney. However he closed the store and sold his stock in trade in October 1843. A month later he was declared insolvent owing £21/9/6.

He was trading to the Pacific Islands by 1844.

=== Publican ===
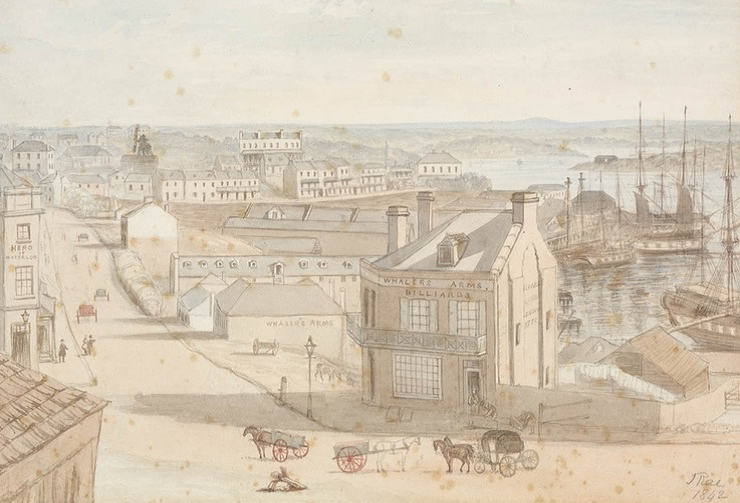
The Whalers Arms, Millers' Point in 1842

In July 1847 he applied for the license of the Whalers' Arms public house, Windmill Street, Miller's Point; one of three pubs with that name in Sydney at the time. He remained the licensee till September 1855. In 1856 he applied for the licence to the Grafton Hotel, 26 Kent Street, Sydney. He had left that hotel by 1862 and moved on to another pub in Millers Point, the Gladstone Hotel. That one he left in January 1863.

As the 1850s went on, his commercial interests began to shift to maritime activities and shipping.

=== Shipowner ===
He was the owner, or part-owner, of at least 36 vessels between 1850 and 1875. Six of these vessels were used as whalers and they made 19 voyages in that trade between 1852 and 1874.

From about 1850, Merriman was shipping goods to New Zealand and the Pacific Islands. His associates in his ship-owning and trading operations were Captains Hugh Fairclough (1828-1898) and Benjamin Jenkins (c1830-1901) and Mr William Andrews.

Some of the vessels were involved in the gathering of Beche-de-mer and pearl shell. A few of them were lost at sea. In 1872 his vessel the barque James Merriman was lost at sea while engaged in the pearl shell fishery in Torres Strait.

=== Landlord ===
He seems to have been a considerable property owner in Sydney. In December 1862 he advertised for tradesmen to repair seven houses in Argyle St, Millers Point.

=== Politician ===
From 1867 to 1883 he served on Sydney City Council, including periods as mayor in 1873 and from 1877 to 1878. In 1877 he was elected to the New South Wales Legislative Assembly for West Sydney, but he did not re-contest in 1880.

He was made a trustee of the Wentworth Park Trust in July 1878. In December of that year he was appointed as a member of the Sydney International Exhibition Commission.

Merriman died in Sydney on 12 May 1883.

=== Recognition ===
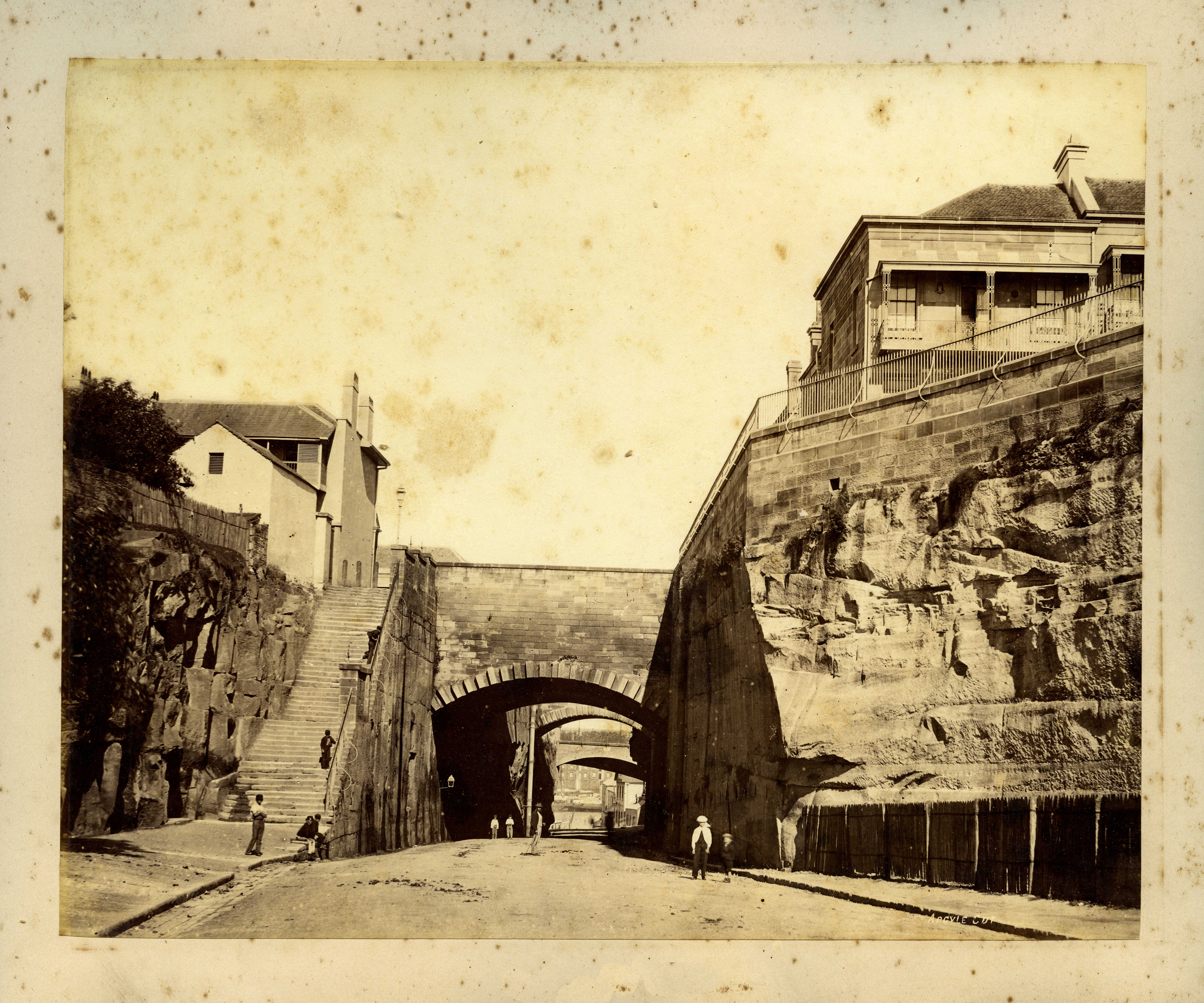
Argyle Cut with Merriman Stairs on the left

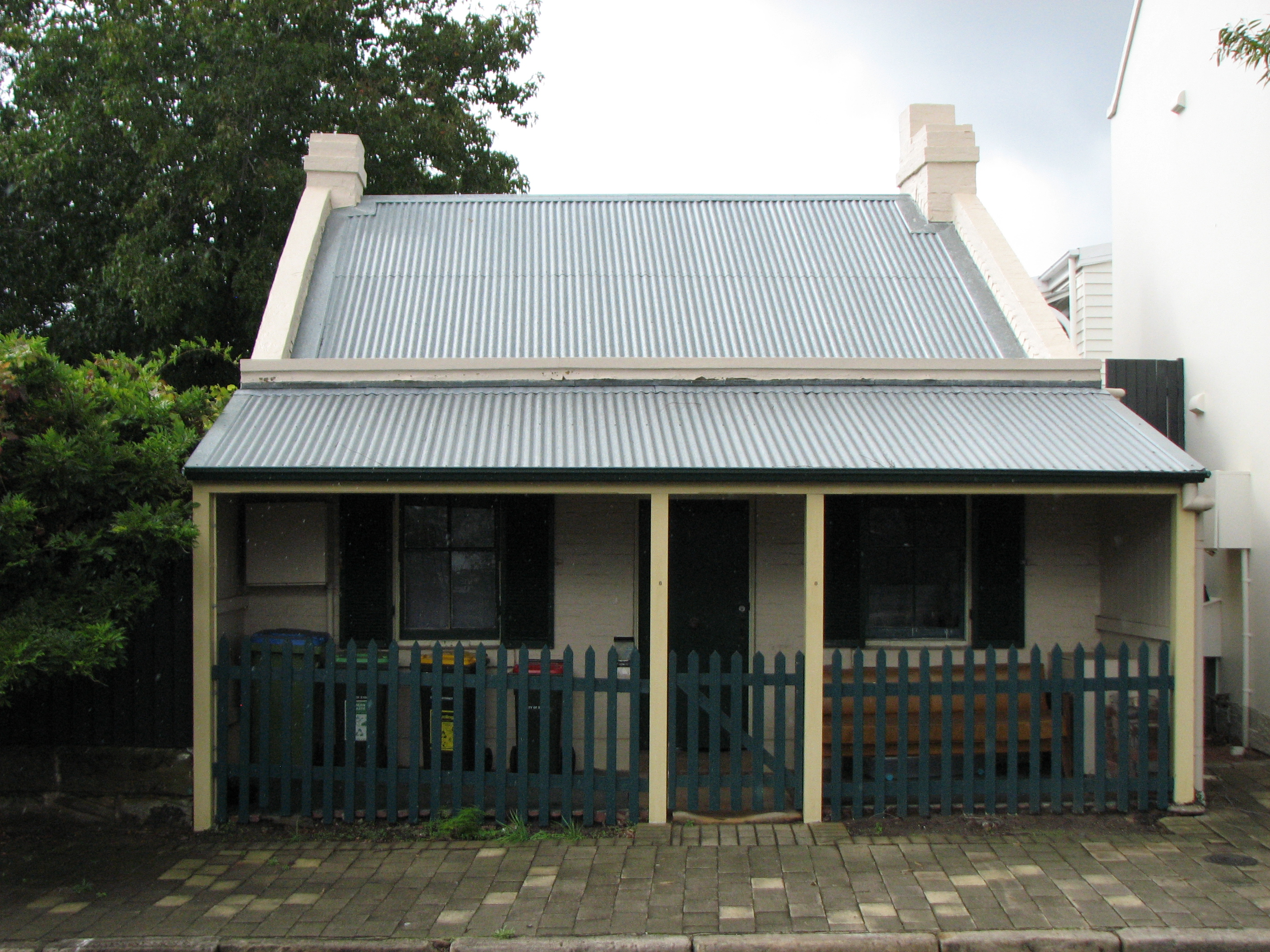
A heritage listed cottage at 18 Merriman St, Millers Point

Stairs were built beside Argyle Cut in 1859 and named in honour of James Merriman. They were demolished in 1931 to make way for the construction of Sydney Harbour Bridge.

Crown Road in Miller's Point was renamed Merriman Street in 1875.

After his death in 1883 The Bulletin offered this evaluation.

In the whole of the City of Sydney, it is to be questioned if there was any one who had the amount of influence of the deceased ... Mr Merriman was quietly and unobtrusively charitable. He was foolish enough to give away a great deal of money, and to never advertise it ... [he] lived in a large but rather rambling house in Argyle Street. It was always bright and clean .. At Millers Point [he] was King. He seems to have owned it all from the Argyle Cut to the Central Wharf. But with the exception of maintaining a handsome carriage and pair for his family, his unostentatiousness bordered on the primitive.

New South Wales Legislative Assembly
Preceded by John Booth; Henry Dangar; George Dibbs	Member for West Sydney; 1877–1880; Served alongside: Angus Cameron, John Harris, Daniel O'Connor	Succeeded by Francis Abigail; William Martin
Civic offices
Preceded by Michael Chapman	Mayor of Sydney; 1873	Succeeded by Stephen Goold
Preceded by Benjamin Palmer	Mayor of Sydney; 1877–1878	Succeeded by Charles Roberts
