= July 1865 West Sydney colonial by-election =

By-election in New South Wales, Australia

A by-election was held for the New South Wales Legislative Assembly electorate of West Sydney on 7 July 1865 because of the resignation of John Darvall to return to England.

== Dates ==
Date	Event
22 June 1865	John Darvall resigned.
28 June 1865	Writ of election issued by the Speaker of the Legislative Assembly.
5 July 1865	Nominations
7 July 1865	Polling day
12 July 1865	Return of writ

== Result ==
1865 West Sydney by-election Friday 7 July
Candidate	Votes	%
Geoffrey Eagar (elected)	1,314	53.8
William Love	1,130	46.2
Total formal votes	2,444	100.0
Informal votes	0	0.0
Turnout	2,444	31.3

== See also ==
- Electoral results for the district of West Sydney
- List of New South Wales state by-elections
