= Alexander Kethel =

Australian politician

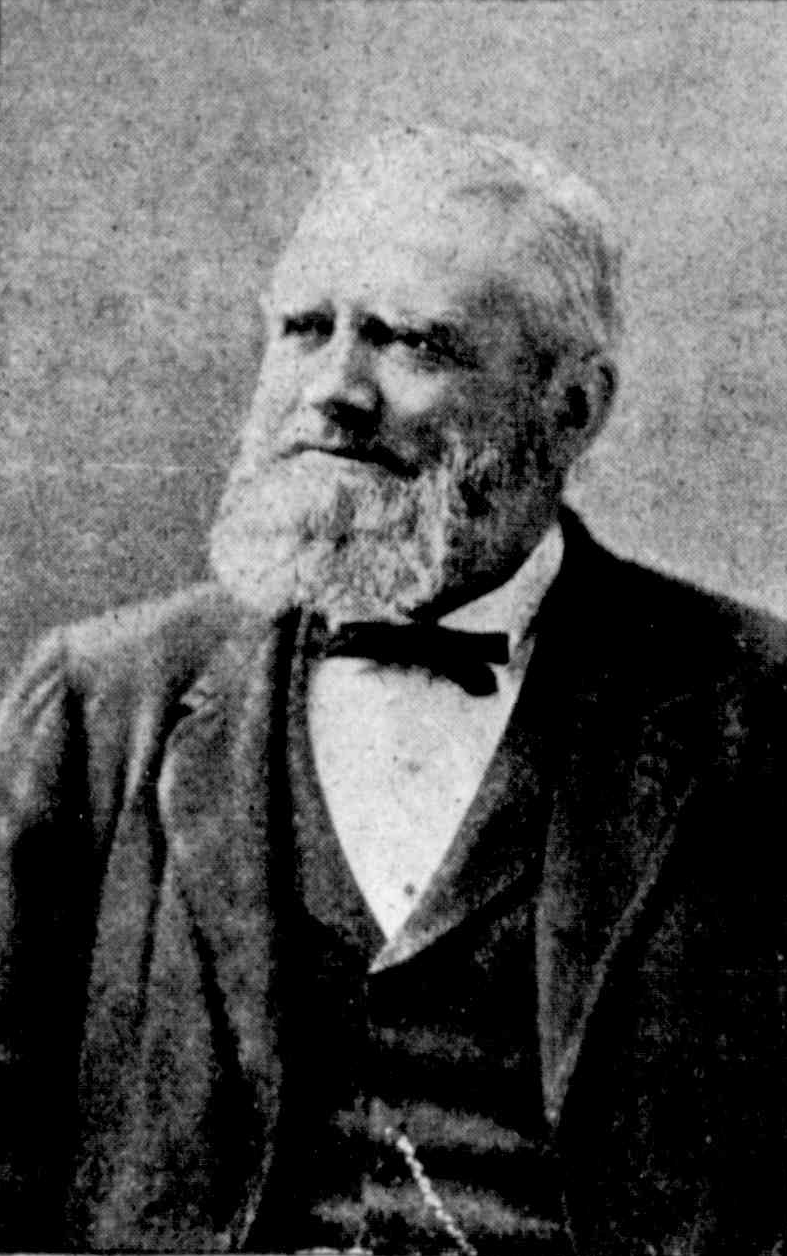

Alexander Kethel (2 November 1832 – 23 June 1916) was a Scottish-born Australian politician and timber merchant. From 1895 to 1889 he served as member for the Electoral district of West Sydney in the Parliament of New South Wales. In his first period he was unaffiliated and after his re-election in 1887 he represented the Free Trade Party. In 1895 he was appointed a member to the upper house of the parliament, the Legislative Council where he remained until his death.

== Early life ==
He was born in Perth, Scotland, to carpenter William Kethel and Mary Watson. After a limited education, he was apprenticed to a shoemaker and then went to sea, traveling in the North Sea and the Mediterranean before jumping ship in Sydney in 1853. After working on coastal vessels and in the Victorian goldfields, he returned to Sydney to work at John Booth's sawmill, promoted to foreman and one of three partners leasing the business from 1870. In 1861 he married Mary Ann Yeates; they had seven children. He faced a number of set backs, having been shipwrecked 3 times, then the sawmill burnt down in 1874.

It was as a wholesale timber merchant that he prospered, becoming a wharfinger, leasing the market wharf in Sydney. moving into coastal shipping, including as a ship owner. In 1888 he had a Grand Victorian mansion built on the corner of Glebe Point and Wigram Roads in Glebe which he named Ben Ledi, after the mountain near his birthplace in Scotland.

== Political career ==
He was elected to the New South Wales Legislative Assembly in 1885 for West Sydney. Re-elected as a Free Trader in 1887, he did not re-contest in 1889. In 1892 he was appointed to a Royal Commission, along with William Owen and John Young, to inquire into charges made by William Schey against Edward Eddy, the Chief Commissioner of Railways. In 1895 he was appointed to the New South Wales Legislative Council, where he remained until his death. He did not hold ministerial or parliamentary office.

== Death ==
His son was the architect Joseph Alexander Kethel. He died at Castle Hill on 23 June 1916 (aged 83), survived by two sons and three daughters.

New South Wales Legislative Assembly
Preceded by Angus Cameron; George Merriman	Member for West Sydney; 1885 – 1889; With: Francis Abigail; Daniel O'Connor; John Young / George Merriman	Succeeded by Alfred Lamb; Thomas Playfair
