= William Love (Australian politician) =

Australian politician

- Born: 1810; Omagh, Ireland
- Died: 31 January 1885 (aged 74–75); Gundagai
- Occupations: merchant, magistrate, politician
- Title: Mr William Love PM
- Spouse: Ellinor (née Robinson)

William Love (1810-1885) was a member of the New South Wales Legislative Assembly for West Sydney from 1860 to 1864. Love served as Chairman of the Sydney Revenues Improvement Bill Committee.

== Early life ==
Love married to Ellinor Robinson at Fintona, Ireland in 1838 and they arrived in Sydney in 1841 as bounty immigrants in the Brothers. The family settled on the Coppabella Run at Tumbarumba, New South Wales, owned by Love's father-in-law, James Robinson (d.1868).

After failing on the land, in 1850 Love opened a retail grocery shop at 476 George Street with his son James as a partner. In 1875 William was appointed police magistrate at Gundagai.

== NSW parliament ==
Love was a candidate at the 1860 election where he was the third of four members elected, with 1,538 votes (14.4%). He stood again at the 1864–65 election however he was defeated, finishing seventh with 662 votes (5.3%). He stood again at the 1865 West Sydney by-election, but was again unsuccessful with 1,130 votes (46.2%).

== Later life ==
The grocery firm Love and Son became insolvent in 1866.

Love died at Gundagai on 31 January 1885 (aged 75).

Love and Ellinor had 7 children. Of these James was a successful merchant, while Milton was a well known Sydney stipendiary magistrate.

New South Wales Legislative Assembly
| Preceded by John Dunmore Lang; Thomas Broughton; James Pemell; John Plunkett | Member for West Sydney; 1860–1864; With: Lang; Dalgleish; Windeyer/Eagar | Succeeded by John Dunmore Lang; John Darvall; Samuel Joseph; John Robertson |
