= Henry Cary Dangar =

Australian politician (1830–1917)

Member of the New South Wales Legislative Council
- In office 9 October 1883 – 25 April 1917

Member of the New South Wales Legislative Assembly for East Sydney
- In office 17 November 1880 – 23 November 1882 Serving with Henry Parkes, George Reid and Arthur Renwick
- Preceded by: John Davies; James Greenwood; John Macintosh
- Succeeded by: Edmund Barton; George Griffiths; John McElhone

Member of the New South Wales Legislative Assembly for West Sydney
- In office 16 December 1874 – 12 October 1877 Serving with Angus Cameron, George Dibbs and John Robertson
- Preceded by: John Booth; Joseph Raphael; Joseph Wearne
- Succeeded by: John Harris; James Merriman; Daniel O'Connor

Personal details
- Born: 4 June 1830 Port Stephens, New South Wales, Australia
- Died: 25 April 1917 (aged 86) Potts Point, New South Wales, Australia

Henry Cary Dangar (4 June 1830 – 25 April 1917) was a colonial Australian politician. He served two terms in the New South Wales Legislative Assembly during the 1870s and 1880s.

== Biography ==
Dangar was born in Port Stephens, New South Wales, the second son of Henry Dangar. Dangar was educated at Trinity College, Cambridge, where he graduated M.A. in 1857. He entered at the Inner Temple in August 1849, and was called to the bar in June 1854.

Dangar was elected to the New South Wales Legislative Assembly on 16 December 1874 for West Sydney, a seat he held until 12 October 1877. He then represented East Sydney from 17 November 1880 to 23 November 1882. On 9 October 1883 he was appointed to the New South Wales Legislative Council, a position he held until his death.

Dangar was a member of the Australian Jockey Club for 42 years. On 19 September 1865, Dangar married Lucy Lamb.

Dangar died of hemiplegia in Potts Point, Sydney, on 25 April 1917, aged 86. His estate was valued at £48,312 for probate.

New South Wales Legislative Assembly
Preceded by John Booth; Joseph Raphael; Joseph Wearne	Member for West Sydney; 1874–1877; Served alongside: Cameron, Dibbs, Robertson	Succeeded by John Harris; James Merriman; Daniel O'Connor
Preceded by John Davies; James Greenwood; John Macintosh	Member for East Sydney; 1880–1882; Served alongside: Parkes, Reid, Renwick	Succeeded by Edmund Barton; George Griffiths; John McElhone
