= Daniel O'Connor (politician) =

Australian politician (1844–1914)

The Honourable Daniel O'Connor JP
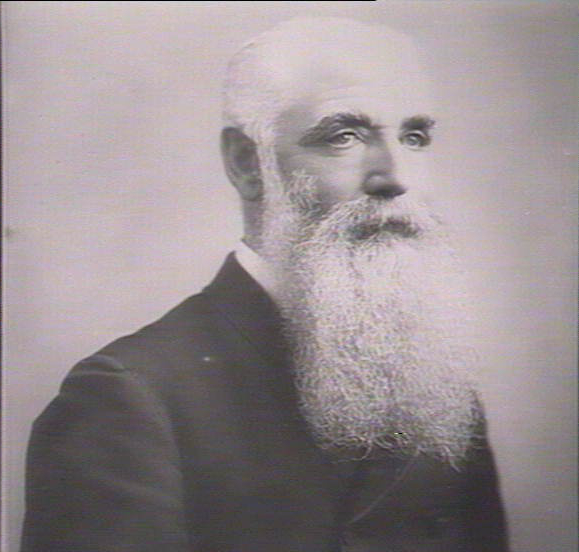

Member of the New South Wales Parliament for Electoral district of West Sydney
- In office 1877–1891

Member of Legislative Council of New South Wales
- In office 1891–1892
- In office 1895–1898

Member of the New South Wales Parliament for Electoral district of Sydney-Phillip
- In office 1900–1904

Personal details
- Born: 13 September 1844 County Tipperary, Ireland
- Died: 24 January 1914 (aged 69) Liverpool, New South Wales, Australia
- Spouse: Mary Carroll

Daniel O'Connor JP (13 September 1844 – 24 January 1914) was an Irish-born politician and businessman active in colonial-era New South Wales.

== Early life and education ==
O'Connor was born in County Tipperary, Ireland, to Patrick and Margaret O'Connor. In 1854 he moved with his family to Sydney, sailing on the Lord Hungerford. The younger O'Connor joined his father working in a butcher's shop after only a brief education. Eventually as a teenager he studied literature at the Sydney School of Arts and later at the City College.

He was married in 1868 to Mary Carroll. They had seven children.

== Business ==
By the early 1870s O'Connor had his own butchering business and had accumulated 14 houses and 7000 pounds. By 1872 he had lost his money and houses after speculating on goldmining shares. By the time the decade was out he had regained his fortune.

== Public life ==
O'Connor was active in Sydney public life in the 1870s, being a member of the Catholic Association, chair of the Catholic Truth Society and vocal in his support of pardoned Fenian prisoners. In 1876 he was elected to the Phillip Ward of the Sydney City Council. Apart from a brief period in 1879, he represented the ward until 1885.

O'Connor was elected to the West Sydney electorate of the New South Wales Legislative Assembly in 1877. As a member of Parliament he was an opponent of Chinese immigration and payment of Members of Parliament. In December 1885 O'Connor was appointed Postmaster-General in the fifth Robertson ministry, a role he served in for just over two months, until the ministry fell in February 1886. He joined the Free Trade Party with the emergence of political parties at the 1887 election. He was again appointed Postmaster-General in March 1889 in the fifth Parkes ministry, serving for over two and a half years.

After serving eight terms and almost 14 years in the Legislative Assembly he lost his seat of West Sydney in the 1891 election that saw the emergence of the Labour Party, winning all four seats in West Sydney. He was subsequently appointed to the New South Wales Legislative Council.

While still in Parliament, O'Connor went into business with sometime-politician John Hurley. In 1892 the business collapsed, forcing O'Connor, and Hurley, to declare bankruptcy. As a bankrupt he had to give up his seat in the Legislative Council. He was reappointed in 1895, serving until his resignation in July 1898 when he attempted to regain a seat in the Legislative Assembly switching to Edmund Barton's National Federal Party.

O'Connor was elected to the Legislative Assembly seat of Sydney-Phillip at the 1900 by-election on a Protectionist ticket, retaining the seat in 1901. He served the electorate until 1904 when he finally withdrew from public life.

== World trip ==
After leaving Parliament O'Connor embarked on a world tour, visiting England and Ireland before heading to the United States. He was in San Francisco during the 1906 earthquake and lost all of his belongings.

== Death ==
O'Connor died at the Liverpool, New South Wales, asylum in 1914 (aged 69). He was buried in the Catholic section of the Waverley Cemetery.

New South Wales Legislative Assembly
| Preceded by Henry Dangar; George Dibbs; John Robertson; Angus Cameron | Member for West Sydney; 1877–1891; With: Cameron/Kethel/Playfair; Harris/Martin/G. Merriman/Young/Lamb/Taylor; J. Merriman/Abigail | Succeeded by George Black; Thomas Davis; Jack FitzGerald; Andrew Kelly |
| Preceded by Henry Copeland | Member for Sydney-Phillip; 1900–1904 | District abolished |
