= Thomas Playfair =

Australian politician

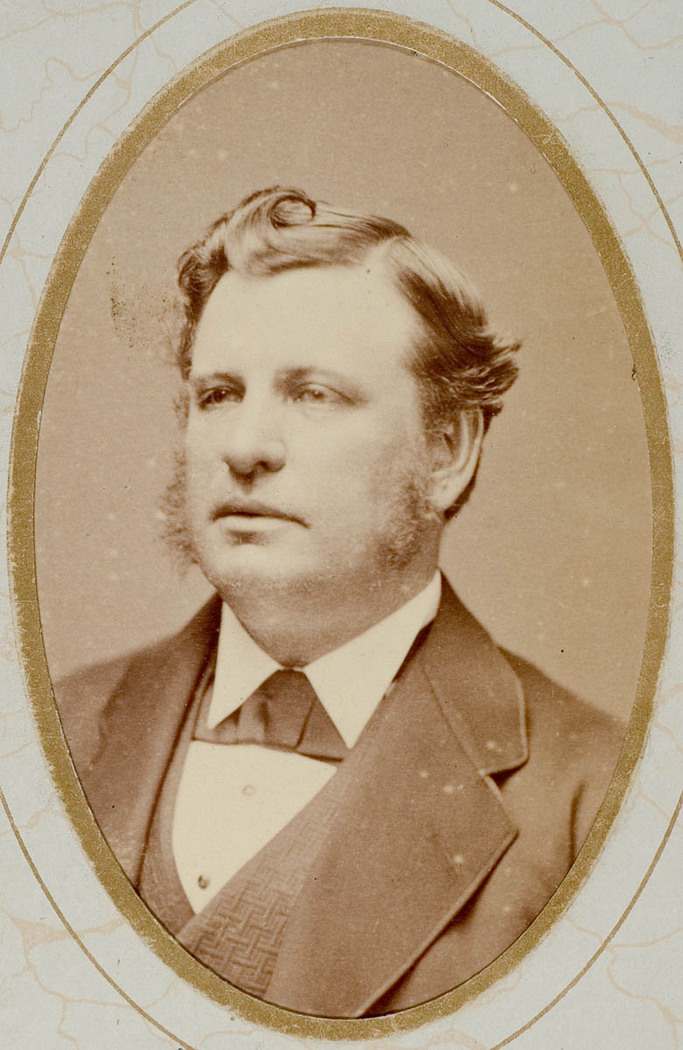
- Portrait of Playfair
- Born: John Thomas Playfair; Essex, England
- Baptised: 12 February 1832
- Died: 15 November 1893; Kings Cross, New South Wales
- Occupations: Navy steward, butcher, ship's providore, politician
- Known for: Reforms in public sanitation, establishment of Homebush sale-yards, charitable work
- Relatives: Thomas Alfred John Playfair (grandson)

Sydney City Council

Councillor
- In office 1875–1893

John Thomas Playfair (1832 – 15 November 1893) was an English-born Australian butcher, ship's providore, politician and benefactor.

== Early life ==
John Thomas Playfair, known as Thomas Playfair, the eldest son of tailor Thomas Playfair and Mary Anne, née Arnold, was baptised on 12 February 1832 in Essex, England. He went to sea at the age of twelve, becoming a captain's steward in the Royal Navy. In 1859, he settled in Sydney, entering into a partnership with wholesale butcher E. J. Baily, also operating a separate business as a shipping butcher at 103 George Street, The Rocks. On 7 November 1860, he married Ellen Matheson, with whom he had three sons. After her death in 1866, he married her sister, Georgina Hope, on 26 February 1867; they had a daughter and two sons.

== Career ==
Following the death of E. J. Baily, Playfair continued the business partnership with his widow. The ship's providore venture grew into a prosperous enterprise.

Playfair was a Sydney City Councillor, representing Gipps Ward continuously from 1875 to 1893. His achievements during his time in the Council include the widening of George Street North and the erection of new cattle sale-yards at Homebush. Serving as Mayor of Sydney in 1885, he pledged to "improve the homes of the poor, and clear out the dark places of the city". In 1889, he was elected to the New South Wales Legislative Assembly as a Free Trade member for West Sydney, serving only one term before his defeat in 1891.

== Personal life ==
Playfair was a generous benefactor to several charities, including the Sydney Ragged School, the Sisters of St Joseph's Providence and the Boys' Brigade.

Playfair died at his home in Darlinghurst Road, Kings Cross on 15 November 1893, following an attack of rheumatic gout. He was interred in the Church of England section of Waverley Cemetery. His estate, which included approximately thirty properties in the city, Eastern Suburbs, North Sydney and Manly, was divided between his four surviving children, Thomas Arnold, Edmund John Baily, Jessie and Alfred Donald. The butchering business was bequeathed to Edmund.

== Legacy / Memorials ==
Playfair Street and Playfair Stairs, both located in The Rocks, are named after Thomas Playfair.

The Playfair Memorial Drinking Fountain was installed at the Flemington sale-yards in May 1896, in recognition of Playfair's efforts to modernise Sydney's water supply. The fountain was moved to Sydney Olympic Park on 1 March 1968.

A plaque was placed on the doors of Holy Trinity Church in Millers Point in 1960 in his memory.

New South Wales Legislative Assembly
Preceded by Alexander Kethel; George Merriman	Member for West Sydney; 1889–1891; Served alongside: Abigail, Lamb/Taylor, O'Connor	Succeeded by George Black; Thomas Davis; Jack FitzGerald; Andrew Kelly
Civic offices
Preceded by John Hardie	Mayor of Sydney; 1885	Succeeded by John Young
