= William Speer (politician) =

Irish-born Australian politician

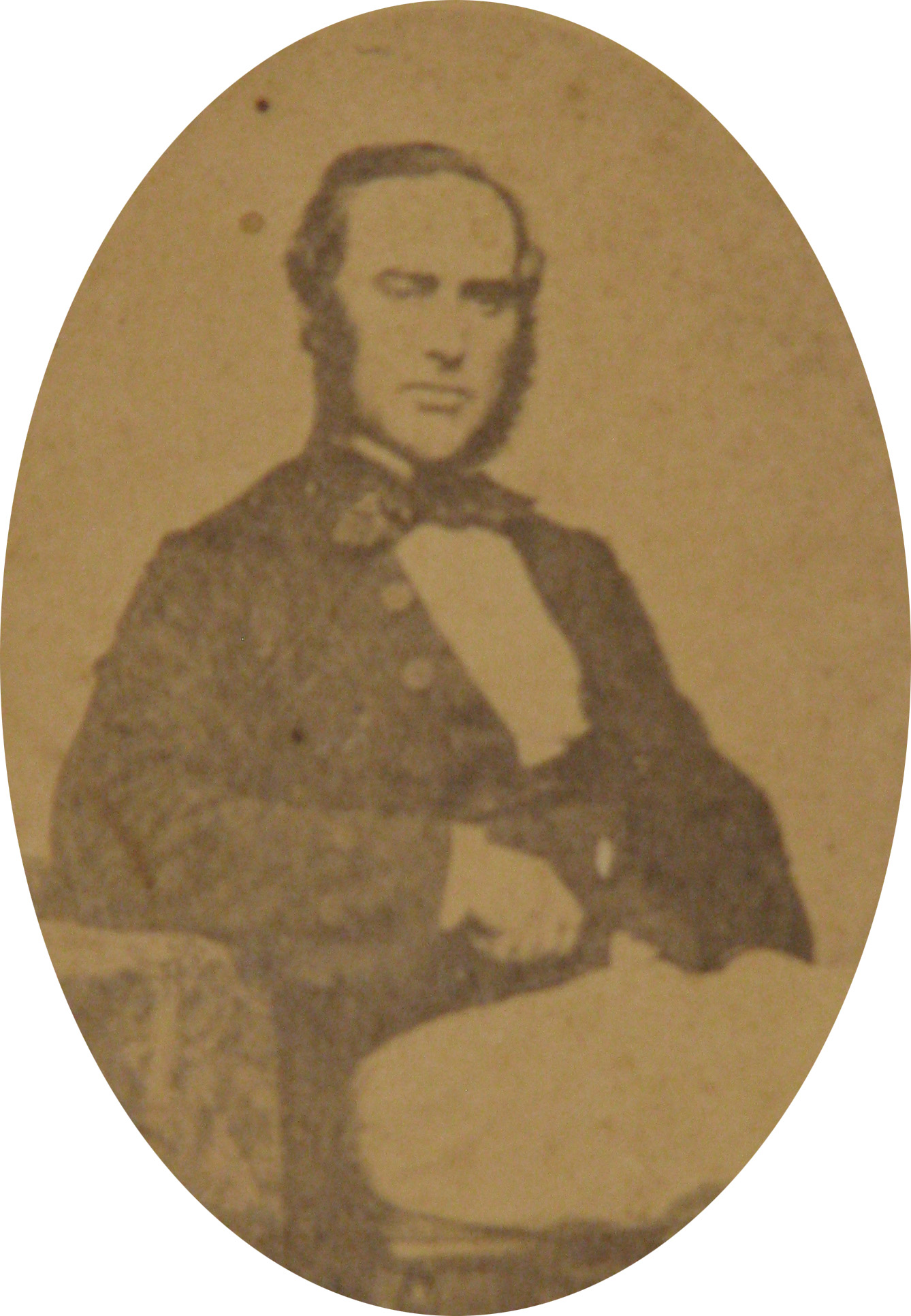
William Speer

William Speer (1818 – 20 September 1900) was an Irish-born Australian politician.

Speer was born in County Tyrone and migrated to Australia in 1841. Elected an alderman of the Sydney Municipal Council in 1858, he served as mayor in 1864. In 1869 he was elected to the New South Wales Legislative Assembly for West Sydney, but he did not re-contest in 1872. Speer died at Glebe Point in 1900.

New South Wales Legislative Assembly
Preceded by William Campbell; Geoffrey Eagar; John Lang	Member for West Sydney; 1869–1872; Served alongside: Robertson, Wearne, Windeyer	Succeeded by John Booth; Joseph Raphael
