= Joseph Wearne =

Australian politician (1832–1884)

Joseph Wearne (19 August 1832 – 8 June 1884) was an English-born Australian politician.

He was born at St Levan in Cornwall, to miller Joseph Wearne and Susannah Rogers. He and his family migrated to Sydney in 1849, and after an attempt on the Victorian goldfields settled at Liverpool around 1853. Wearne became a flour miller. On 21 January 1857, he married Isabella Caldwell, with whom he had six children. He was elected to the New South Wales Legislative Assembly for West Sydney in 1869, transferring to Central Cumberland in 1875 but resigning later the same year due to bankruptcy. He was discharged in 1876, and died at Liverpool in 1884. His nephew, Walter Wearne, also served in the Legislative Assembly.

New South Wales Legislative Assembly
Preceded by William Campbell; Geoffrey Eagar; John Lang	Member for West Sydney; 1869–1874; Served alongside: Robertson, Speer/Raphael, Windeyer/Booth	Succeeded by Angus Cameron; Henry Dangar; George Dibbs
Preceded by John Hurley	Member for Central Cumberland; 1875; Served alongside: John Lackey	Succeeded by William Long
