= Francis Abigail =

Australian politician

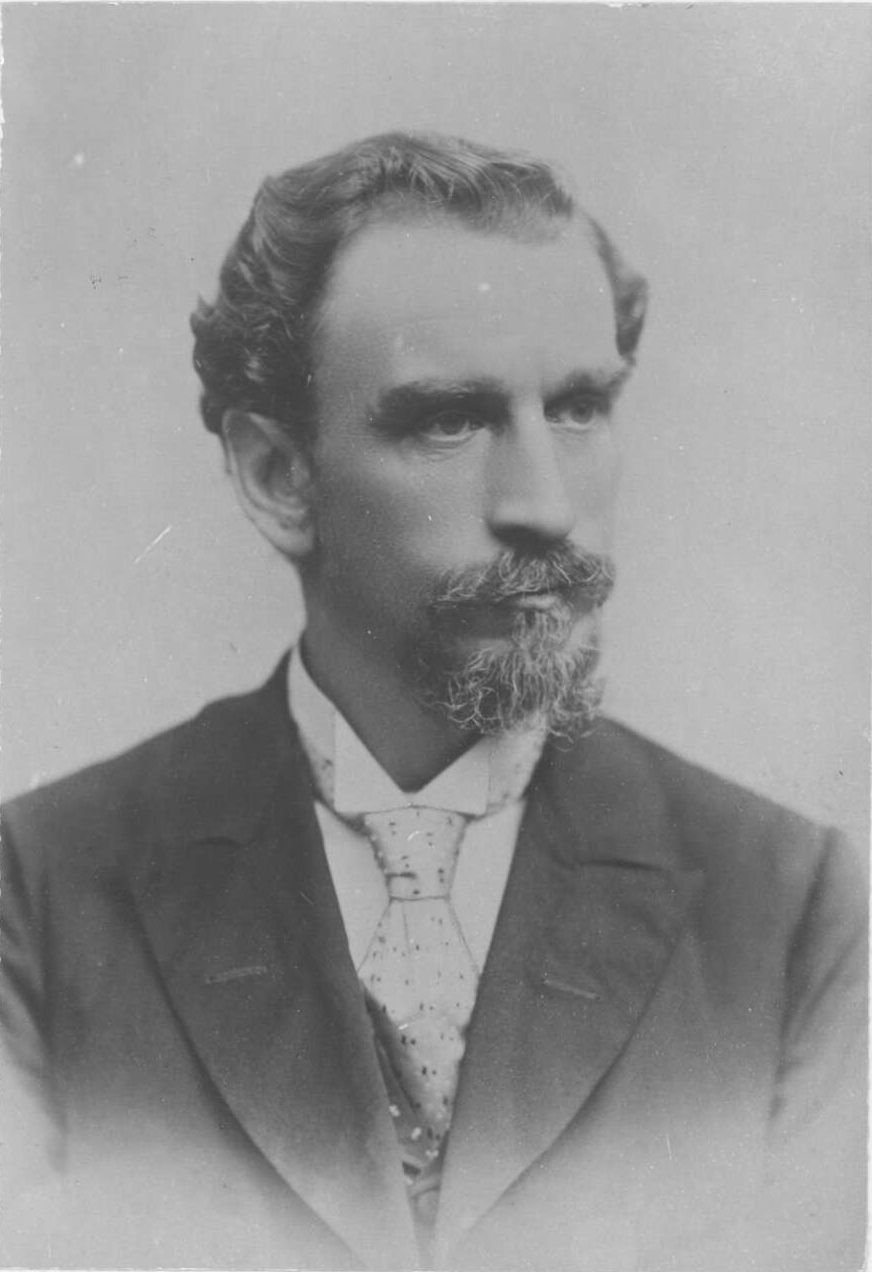
- Francis Abigail, MLA, c1887, NSW Secretary of Mines

Member of the NSW Legislative Assembly

Member of Parliament for West Sydney
- In office 1880–1891

Personal details
- Born: 16 January 1840 London, England
- Died: 23 July 1921 (aged 81) Ashfield, New South Wales
- Spouse: Mary Ann Wenner (married 1861)
- Children: 12
- Parent(s): William Abigail; Hannah Coney

Francis Abigail (16 January 1840 – 23 July 1921) was politician and manufacturer from New South Wales, Australia.

== Early life ==
Francis Abigail was the son of Hannah née Coney and William Abigail. In 1860, he immigrated to Sydney and was married the following year.

== Politics and public service ==
He served as a Member of the New South Wales Legislative Assembly for West Sydney from 1880 to June 1891. He served as Secretary for Mines in the fourth ministry of Sir Henry Parkes from 20 January 1887 to 10 January 1889.

He was a Justice of the Peace for the colonies of New South Wales and Victoria.

Abigail was a member of the New South Wales Commission for the Melbourne Centennial Exhibition of 1888. In 1890, he was a member of the Exhibition of Mining and Metallurgy, held at the Crystal Palace. That same year, he visited England and the various Orange bodies in England and the north of Ireland. While in London, he gave evidence before the Royal Commission on Mines.

== Criminal conviction ==
In July 1887 he was elected to the board of the Australian Banking Co, subsequently becoming chairman of directors and the company was placed in liquidation on 10 November 1891. In October 1892 he was charged, along with 6 others, with falsely representing the affairs of the bank, and was found not guilty. He was then charged with conspiring with the manager, Roderick McNamara, to issue a false balance sheet, with fraudulent intent. They were convicted and Abigail was sentenced to imprisonment for 5 years while McNamara was sentenced to 7 years. He was released from prison in June 1895 after serving 2 years 6 months and 29 days.

== Later life ==
He attempted to return to politics, standing as an independent Free Trade candidate at the 1901 NSW Senate election, but polled 7,164 votes. well short of the 70,000 needed for election.

Abigail died at Ashfield on 23 July 1921 (aged 81).

Parliament of New South Wales
Political offices
Preceded by Charles Mackellar	Secretary for Mines; 1887 – 1889	Succeeded by John Chanter
New South Wales Legislative Assembly
Preceded by John Harris; James Merriman	Member for West Sydney; 1880 – 1891; With: Cameron/Kethel/Playfair; Martin/Merriman/Young/Merriman/Lamb/Taylor; O'Connor	Succeeded by George Black; Thomas Davis; Jack FitzGerald; Andrew Kelly
