= John Young (Australian politician) =

Scottish-born Australian politician

John Douglas Young (1842 – 16 November 1893) was a Scottish-born Australian politician.

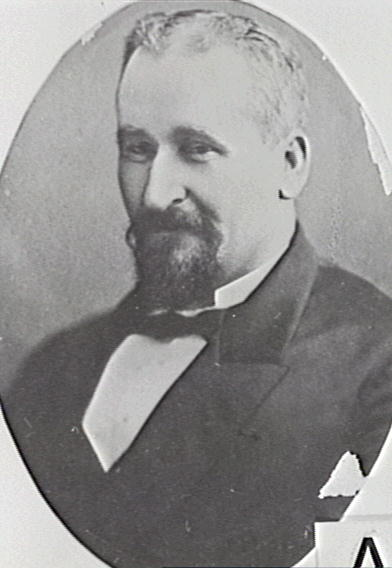
John Douglas Young, Alderman for Gipps Ward, 1879 to 1893

He was born in Hamilton in Lanarkshire to miner William Young and Helen Wilson. At the age of thirteen he became an apprentice engineer, and he went to sea two years later. In 1865 he settled in Sydney, where he worked a number of jobs before purchasing a hotel around 1869. On 27 March 1869 he married widow Margaret O'Brien Kelly, with whom he had a son. A Sydney City Councillor from 1879 to 1893, he was elected to the New South Wales Legislative Assembly for West Sydney in 1885, but he was defeated in 1887. He was appointed to the New South Wales Legislative Council in 1892, where he remained until his death in Sydney in 1893.

New South Wales Legislative Assembly
| Preceded by Angus Cameron; George Merriman | Member for West Sydney; 1885–1887; Served alongside: Francis Abigail, Alexander Kethel, Daniel O'Connor | Succeeded by George Merriman |
