= Daniel Dalgleish =

Australian politician

Daniel Cameron Dalgleish (1 February 1827 – 18 February 1870) was a Scottish-born Australian politician.

He was born in Alloa to exercise supervisor Adam Dalgleish. He was apprenticed to an engineer in Edinburgh and then moved to London, where it was difficult to find work due to his membership of the Amalgamated Society of Engineers (ASE). In 1852 he moved to Sydney with others in a similar situation, and on the voyage they formed the first overseas branch of the ASE, which later became the Amalgamated Engineering Union. In 1860 he was elected to the New South Wales Legislative Assembly for West Sydney, but he was defeated in 1864. In 1865 he lost a libel case to Thomas Holt. He was subsequently an inspector for the Steam Navigation Board. Dalgleish died in Sydney in 1870.

New South Wales Legislative Assembly
Preceded by Thomas Broughton; James Pemell; John Plunkett	Member for West Sydney; 1860–1864; Served alongside: Lang, Love, Windeyer/Eagar	Succeeded by John Darvall; Samuel Joseph; John Robertson
