= George Black (Australian politician) =

Australian politician

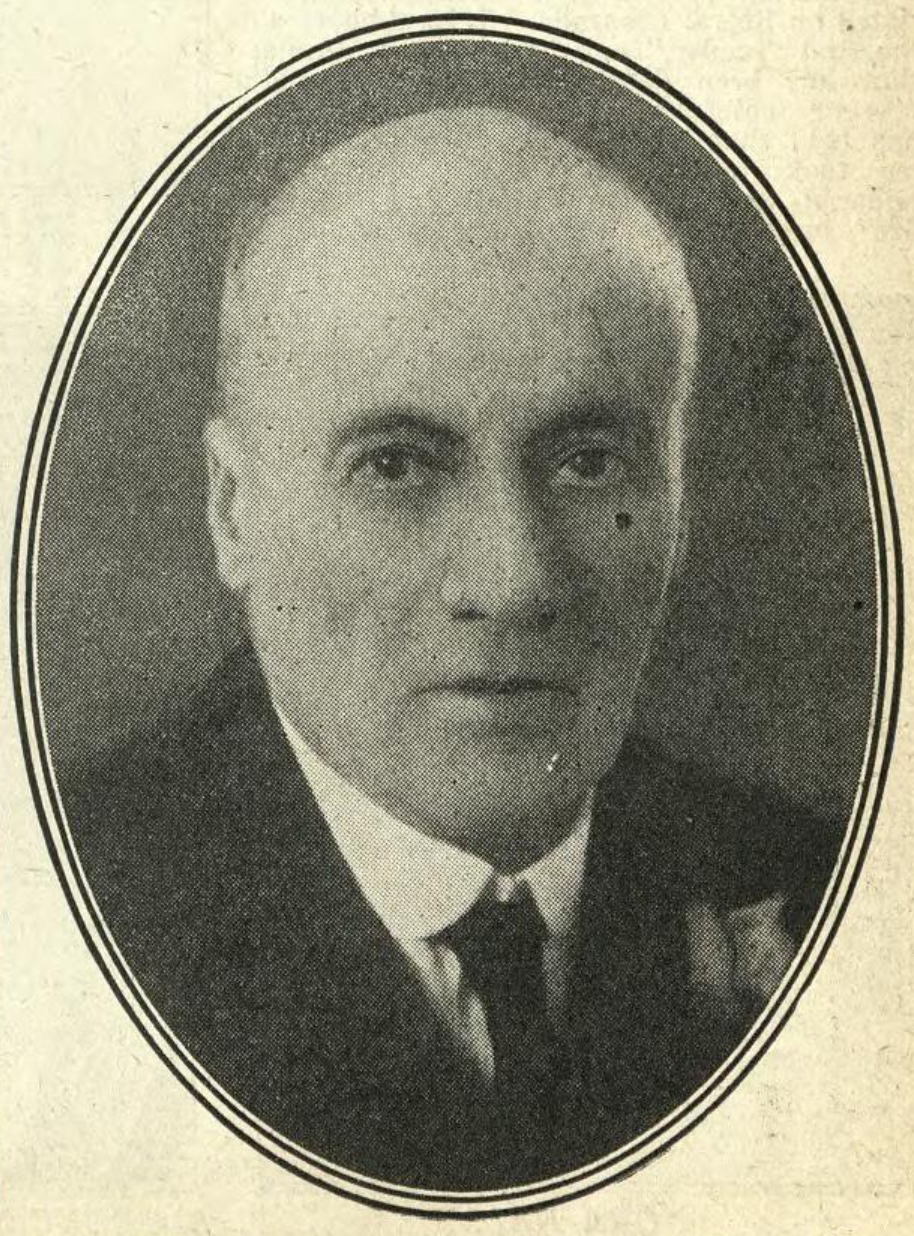
George Black MLC

George Mure Black (15 February 1854 – 18 July 1936) was a Scottish-born Australian politician.

He was born in Edinburgh to messenger-at-arms George Stevenson Black and Isabella Muir. He was educated at Leith and attended the University of Edinburgh, studying arts and medicine but never graduating. He emigrated to Victoria in 1877, moving to New South Wales in 1878. From 1877 he lived with Georgina Duggan; they were never married but had twelve children. Black undertook a variety of jobs, eventually becoming a journalist with the Bulletin from 1889 to 1891 and editor of the Australian Workman from 1891 to 1892. In 1891 he was elected to the New South Wales Legislative Assembly for West Sydney, one of the first group of Labour MLAs. In 1894 he was elected to Sydney-Gipps as an independent Labour member, having fallen out with the party over the introduction of the pledge, but he had rejoined by 1895 after changes were made to the pledge. On 21 June 1894 he had married Rosielinn Clarkson. He was defeated in 1898 and returned to journalism, editing the Sydney Worker, the Radical and the Bathurst National Advocate. He returned to parliament in 1910 as the member for Namoi and was promoted to the front bench as Minister for Agriculture (February to March 1915), Colonial Secretary (1915–1916) and Minister for Public Health (1915–1916). Expelled from the Labor Party over conscription in 1916, he was defeated as an Independent Labor candidate in 1917. He was then appointed by the Nationalist Party to the New South Wales Legislative Council, where he served from 1917 to 1934.

His first wife was Georgina Johnstone. This marriage produced several children.

He married Rosalind Clarkson (née Singleton) in 1894 at St Paul's Anglican Church in Hornsby. Rosalind passed in 1917.

He married Priscilla Verne (née, Jones, Kelly), a former actress on the Tivoli circuit in Australia, at Randwick on 11 April 1928. He had met Priscilla while shopping at David Jones in Sydney. A news article stated that the pair become grandparents several weeks later.

Black died at Lidcombe in 1936.

Parliament of New South Wales
Political offices
Preceded by William Ashford	Minister of Agriculture; Feb–Mar 1915	Succeeded by William Ashford
Preceded by John Cann	Chief Secretary; 1915–1916	Succeeded by George Fuller
Preceded by Fred Flowers	Minister for Public Health; 1915–1916	Succeeded by Fred Flowers
New South Wales Legislative Assembly
Preceded by Francis Abigail; Daniel O'Connor; Thomas Playfair; Adolphus Taylor	Member for West Sydney; 1891–1894; With: Thomas Davis; Jack FitzGerald; Andrew Kelly	Abolished
New district	Member for Sydney-Gipps; 1894–1898	Succeeded by Wilfred Spruson
Preceded by Albert Collins	Member for Namoi; 1910–1917	Succeeded by Walter Wearne
