= William Campbell (New South Wales politician) =

Australian politician (1838–1906)

William Robert Campbell (1838 – 3 July 1906) was an Australian politician.

He was born in Sydney to Annie Sophie Riley and Robert Campbell a merchant and member of the Legislative Council. He attended The King's School in Parramatta and was a pastoralist and merchant before entering politics. In 1868 he was elected to the New South Wales Legislative Assembly for West Sydney, but he was defeated in 1869. On 24 February 1881 he married Eglantine Julia Thomson. He returned to the Assembly in 1880 as the member for Gwydir, serving until his resignation in 1886. He was then appointed to the New South Wales Legislative Council in 1890, where he remained until his death at Elizabeth Bay in 1906.

He had extensive family connections in politics: his grandfather Robert, father, father-in-law Sir Edward Deas Thomson, and uncles John, and Charles, were all members of the New South Wales Parliament.

New South Wales Legislative Assembly
Preceded by Samuel Joseph	Member for West Sydney; 1868–1869; With: Geoffrey Eagar; John Dunmore Lang; William Windeyer	Succeeded by John Robertson; William Speer; Joseph Wearne
Preceded by Thomas Dangar	Member for Gwydir; 1880–1886	Succeeded by Thomas Hassall
