= George Merriman =

Australian politician

George Merriman (1845 – 17 November 1893) was an Australian politician.

He was born in Sydney to shipowner James Merriman, later also a politician, and Anne Thompson. He attended Fort Street Public School and Sydney Grammar School before clerking for a number of solicitors. He was admitted as a solicitor around 1868. Around 1872 he married Minnie Hamilton, with whom he had five children. In 1882 he was elected to the New South Wales Legislative Assembly for West Sydney. Defeated in 1885, he was returned in 1887 but retired due to ill health in 1889. Merriman died at North Sydney in 1893.

New South Wales Legislative Assembly
Preceded by William Martin	Member for West Sydney; 1882–1885; Served alongside: Francis Abigail, Angus Cameron, Daniel O'Connor	Succeeded by Alexander Kethel; John Young
Preceded by John Young	Member for West Sydney; 1887–1889; Served alongside: Francis Abigail, Alexander Kethel, Daniel O'Connor	Succeeded by Alfred Lamb; Thomas Playfair
