= William Martin (Australian politician) =

Australian politician

William Fraser Martin (1834 – 25 October 1917) was a Scottish-born Australian politician.

He was born in Inverness to farmer William Martin and Elizabeth Fraser. The family moved to New South Wales around 1837 and became farmers. Martin followed the gold rushes through New South Wales and Victoria before becoming a farmer in 1859. On 28 April 1859 he married Mary McFarlane, with whom he had two sons. He moved to Sydney to work as a land agent, and in 1880 was elected to the New South Wales Legislative Assembly for West Sydney. He was defeated in 1882, but returned to the Assembly in 1887 as the member for Shoalhaven. He did not contest the 1889 election. Martin died at Redfern in 1917.

New South Wales Legislative Assembly
Preceded by John Harris; James Merriman	Member for West Sydney; 1880–1882; Served alongside: Francis Abigail, Angus Cameron, Daniel O'Connor	Succeeded by George Merriman
Preceded by Frederick Humphery	Member for Shoalhaven; 1887–1889	Succeeded by Philip Morton
