= George Dibbs =

Australian politician (1834–1904)

The Honourable Sir George Dibbs KCMG
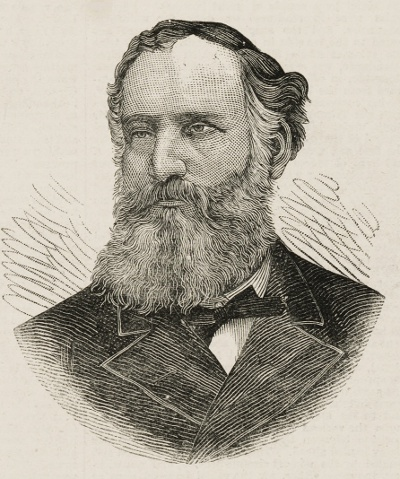
- Dibbs as depicted at the Federation Conference, while New South Wales Colonial Treasurer, 1884

10th Premier of New South Wales
- Constituency: West Sydney (1874–1877); St Leonards (1882–1885); Murrumbidgee (1885–1894); Tamworth (1894–1895)
- In office 7 October 1885 – 21 December 1885
- Preceded by: Alexander Stuart
- Succeeded by: Sir John Robertson
- In office 17 January 1889 – 7 March 1889
- Preceded by: Henry Parkes
- Succeeded by: Henry Parkes
- In office 23 October 1891 – 2 August 1894
- Preceded by: Henry Parkes
- Succeeded by: George Reid

Personal details
- Born: 12 October 1834 Sydney, Australia
- Died: 5 August 1904 (aged 69) Hunters Hill, New South Wales, Australia
- Party: Protectionist Party
- Spouse: Anne Maria Robey
- Children: nine daughters and two sons
- Relatives: Thomas Allwright (brother); John Campbell (brother)

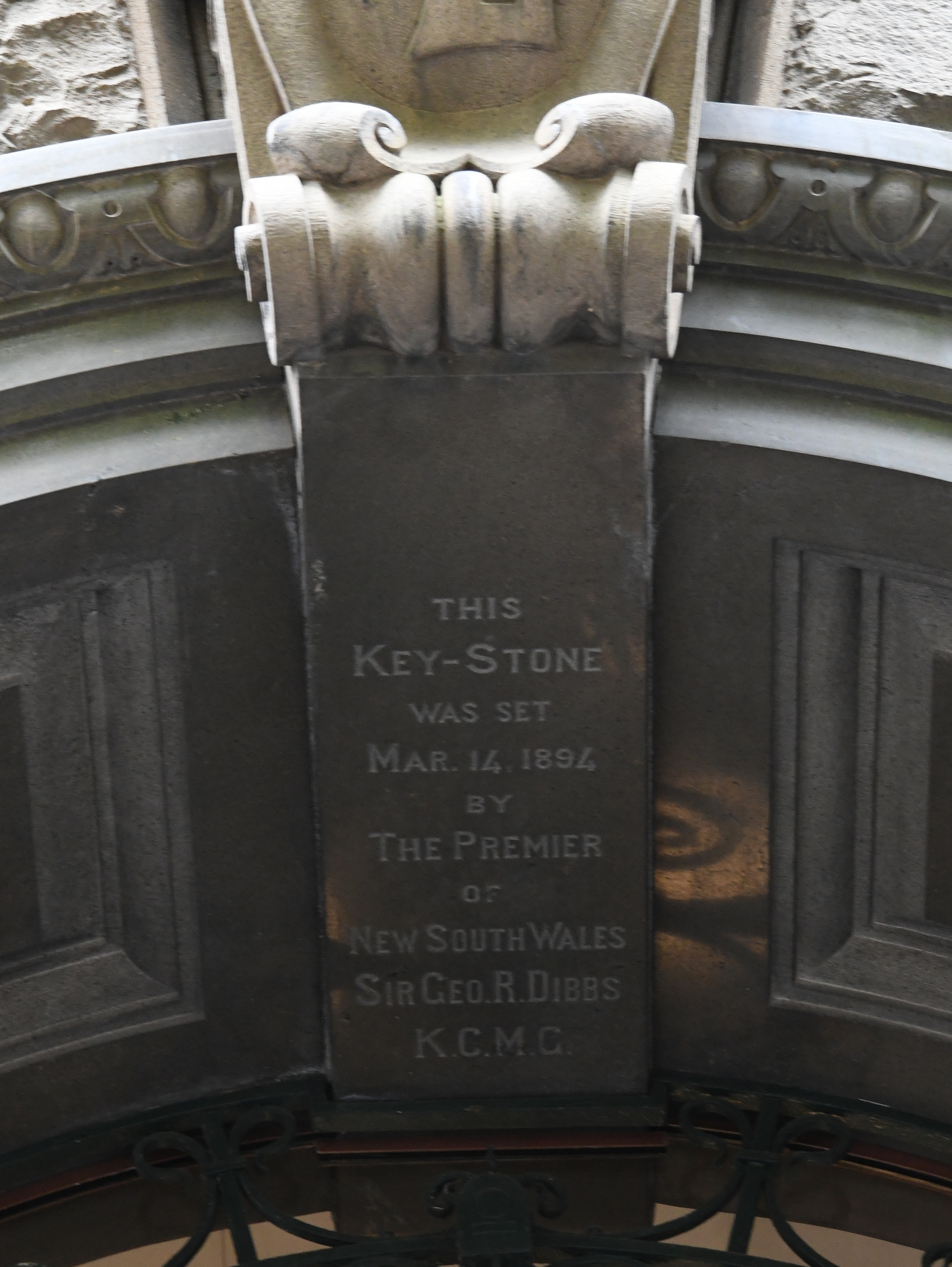
Keystone set by Dibbs in Colonial Mutual Life Building, Sydney

Sir George Richard Dibbs KCMG (12 October 1834 – 5 August 1904) was an Australian politician who was Premier of New South Wales on three occasions. In 1857, he married Anne Maria Robey. He travelled abroad, and established a branch in Valparaiso in 1865, which involved running a Spanish blockade during the Chincha Islands War.

== Political career ==
Dibbs entered parliament in 1874 as MLA for West Sydney, as a supporter of business interests and compulsory, secular and free education, which involved withdrawal of the support from denominational schools, provided under the Education Act of 1866. He opposed the first ministry of Henry Parkes on this issue and was loosely associated with the third ministry of John Robertson, but fell out with Robertson, denouncing his education bill as a sham and betrayal, returning to support Parkes. He lost his seat at the 1877 election due to his support for assisted immigration, which gave him a reputation as an "enemy of labour". Subsequently, a seamen's strike broke out against the Australian Steam Navigation Co, because it had begun to employ Chinese sailors on the Australian coast, and he was obliged as a director of the company to defend its policy, further reducing his popularity.

In 1880 John Shepherd commenced the great slander case against him, claiming that Dibbs had slandered him by saying that Shepherd had committed adultery with the wife of Dibb's brother John. Shepherd obtained judgment for £2000 plus costs, which Dibbs refused to pay and Dibbs was imprisoned at HM Prison Darlinghurst for a year. During his incarceration he was reported in the Sydney Morning Herald as having a suite of rooms, his own manservant to make life tolerable, and a woodworking shop where he made gifts for some 3500 visitors. Ladies decorated his cell with flowers. The woodworking lathe was supplied by Parkes. Dibbs was perceived by the electorate as the virtuous underdog, Shepherd as the villain, and on his release on 6 May 1881, he found his political popularity restored.

In 1882, he won St Leonards, with the support of the unions. In January 1883 he was committed to continued railway-building although revenue was under pressure due to a suspension of land sales and no new taxation. Dibbs would later describe this decision as "the gravest political blunder of my life". The Assembly refused to pass an increase in property tax, so he decided to borrow an unprecedented £14m, giving him a subsequent reputation for extravagance. Stuart resigned due to ill-health in October 1885 and Dibbs became Premier. In the October 1885 elections, he was attacked mercilessly by Parkes who defeated him in the St Leonards election, was defeated for The Richmond, but he won The Murrumbidgee. Although his government polled badly overall, he attempted to govern on, but he was forced to resign after less than three months when it became clear that there would be a budget deficit of over £1m.

Dibbs was Colonial Secretary in the ministry of Sir Patrick Jennings from February 1886 to January 1887. Dibbs was a free trader, however the government introduced an ad valorem tax of 5%, which Dibbs denied was a protective tariff. Parkes formed the Free Trade Party and fought the 1887 election on the fiscal question of free trade or protection. While Dibbs supported free trade, he opposed Parkes, and stood as an independent free trade candidate. Dibbs was politically isolated and in July 1887 joined the Protectionist Party, becoming leader of the party on 20 September 1887.

== Honours ==
He was made a Knight Commander of the Order of St Michael and St George (KCMG) in July 1892.

Parliament of New South Wales
Political offices
Preceded by James Watson	Colonial Treasurer; 1883 – 1885	Succeeded by John Burns
Preceded by Alexander Stuart	Premier of New South Wales; 1885	Succeeded by John Robertson
Preceded by Henry Parkes	Colonial Secretary; 1889	Succeeded by Henry Parkes
Preceded by Henry Parkes	Premier of New South Wales; Colonial Secretary; 1889	Succeeded by Henry Parkes
Preceded by Henry Parkes	Premier of New South Wales; Colonial Secretary; 1891 – 1894	Succeeded by George Reid as Premier
Preceded by Henry Parkes	Premier of New South Wales; Colonial Secretary; 1891 – 1894	Succeeded by James Brunker as Colonial Secretary
New South Wales Legislative Assembly
Preceded by John Robertson; John Booth; Joseph Wearne; Joseph Raphael	Member for West Sydney; 1874 – 1877; With: John Robertson; Angus Cameron; Henry Dangar	Succeeded by Angus Cameron; John Harris; James Merriman; Daniel O'Connor
Preceded by James Farnell	Member for St Leonards; 1882 – 1885; With: Holtermann	Succeeded by Henry Parkes
Preceded by Auber Jones; George Loughnan	Member for Murrumbidgee; 1885 – 1894; With: James Gormly; Bolton/Gale/Copland/Rae	Succeeded by Thomas Fitzpatrick
Preceded by William Dowel; Robert Levien	Member for Tamworth; 1894 – 1895	Succeeded by Albert Piddington
