= Joseph Raphael (politician) =

English-born Australian politician

Joseph George Raphael (16 February 1818 – 2 February 1879) was an English-born Australian politician.

He was born in London to Phillip Raphael, a merchant, and his wife Grace. He migrated to Sydney in 1839, working as a draper and acquiring his own general dealership by 1842. On 30 December 1840, he married Maria Moses, with whom he had five daughters. Active in the business community, he was a Sydney City Councillor from 1860 to 1866 and from 1870 to 1872. In 1872, he was elected to the New South Wales Legislative Assembly for West Sydney, but he was defeated in 1874. Raphael died in Sydney in 1879.

New South Wales Legislative Assembly
Preceded by William Speer; William Windeyer	Member for West Sydney; 1872–1874; Served alongside: John Booth, John Robertson, Joseph Wearne	Succeeded by Angus Cameron; Henry Dangar; George Dibbs
