= John Daniel FitzGerald =

Australian politician, union official, journalist and barrister (1862–1922)

The Honourable John Daniel FitzGerald
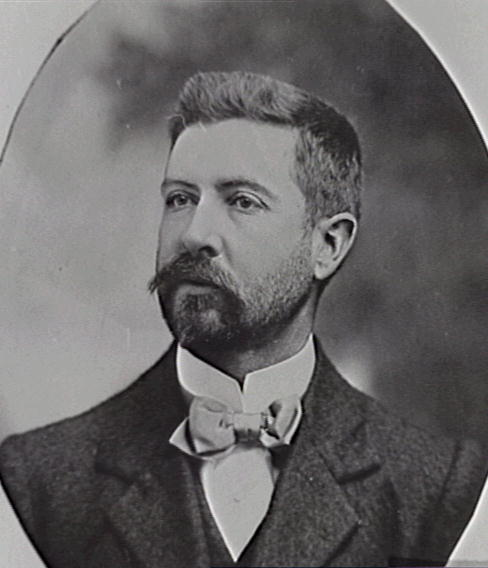
- Fitzgerald c. 1901

Vice-President of the Executive Council
- In office 27 April 1915 – 30 July 1919
- Premier: William Holman
- Preceded by: Frederick Flowers
- Succeeded by: David Hall

Member of the New South Wales Legislative Council
- In office 15 June 1915 – 4 July 1922

Personal details
- Born: 11 June 1862 Shellharbour, Colony of New South Wales
- Died: 4 July 1922 (aged 60) Darling Point, New South Wales, Australia
- Spouse: Octavie Camille Clara Ernestine Roche (m. 1892)

John Daniel FitzGerald (11 June 1862 – 4 July 1922) was a politician, union official, journalist and barrister in New South Wales, Australia.

== Early life ==
Jack FitzGerald was born in Shellharbour to schoolteacher John Daniel FitzGerald and Mary Ann Cullen. He attended Shellharbour Public School, Fort Street Public School and St Mary's Cathedral School in Sydney before apprenticing as a Bathurst compositor. A founding member of the New South Wales Typographical Association, he was president from 1887 to 1888. He was elected to the executive of the Trades and Labor Council. He supported maritime workers in the 1890 strike, paying his own way to travel to England to raise support for the strikers. He returned to Sydney where he was one of the founders of the Labor Electoral League, which became the Labor party. He would later write a book about the origins and rise of the party.

== Legislative Assembly ==
In 1891 FitzGerald stood for Legislative Assembly as a Labor candidate for the 4 member district of West Sydney. He was elected first of the 4 Labour candidates, with the party winning 35 seats, the first Labour candidates elected in the Australasian colonies. Labor took a significant number of votes and seats from the 2 previous major parties in the assembly, which were divided on fiscal lines, the Free Trade and Protectionist parties, giving Labour the balance of power. He was on the steering committee of 5 which led Labor at the time, along with George Black, Joseph Cook, Thomas Houghton and William Sharp. With poor party organisation, the caucus split almost from the day of its first meeting. The fiscal question of free trade or tariff protection was the basis of the division between the parties and Labour was divided as to which was in the best interests of its members. Fitzgerald and Sharp supported protection while Cook and Houghton supported free trade. Black's pragmatic policy of "support in return for concessions" saw Labour support the Free Trade government of Sir Henry Parkes until October 1891, switching support to the Protectionist government of Sir George Dibbs.

In response to the 1892 Broken Hill miners' strike, the strike leaders were arrested for conspiracy on the direction of the government and police were used to support the mines re-opening using strike-breakers. George Reid, the leader of the Free Trade party moved a censure motion against the Dibbs government. Labour unsuccessfully sought to have the Legislative Assembly condemn the handling of the strike. FitzGerald, 3 other Labour members, Andrew Kelly James Johnston and William Sharp and 7 ex-Labour members voted against Reid's censure motion and the Dibbs government hung on. The 4 Labour members were expelled from the party in November 1893.

Multi-member districts were abolished in 1894 and FitzGerald stood as a Protectionist candidate at the 1894 election for the new district of Sydney-Lang. He was defeated by Billy Hughes, finishing 3rd with 22% of the vote. He stood unsuccessfully as a protectionist candidate in 1895 (Bathurst), 1898 (Rylstone) and 1901 federal election (Robertson) and as an independent candidate in 1904 (Belmore). In 1909 he re-joined the Labour party, but was again unsuccessful in 1910 (Darlinghurst). He was a member of the central executive from (1911–16) and vice-president of the party in 1912.

== Career outside parliament ==
FitzGerald was called to the New South Wales Bar in 1900 and was elected a Sydney City Councillor for the Belmore Ward on 7 December 1900, serving until 9 August 1904.

== Legislative Council ==
In 1915 he was appointed to the Legislative Council, serving as Vice-President of the Executive Council (1915–19). He was the Representative of the Holman Labor government in the Legislative Council from 1915 until 1916 when Holman and his supporters were expelled from the Labor Party for supporting conscription. Holman continued as Premier of a grand coalition with the conservative Liberal Reform Party, later merging to become the Nationalist Party. Fitzgerald continued as vice-president of the Executive Council and Representative of the Government in the Legislative Council until 1918. Other ministerial positions he held in the Holman government were Minister of Public Health (1916–19), Minister for Local Government (1916–20), Minister of Justice and Solicitor General (1919–20), and Assistant Minister for Public Instruction (1916).

== Personal life and death ==
On 26 May 1892 Fitzgerald married Octavie Camille Clara Ernestine Roche at Chelsea in England and they had one daughter, Maria. He died at Darling Point on 4 July 1922 (aged 60), survived by his daughter Maria Galatea Clarke.

== Publications ==
- The rise of the Australian Labor Party. Sydney: Australian Labor Party. 1915 – via State Library Victoria.
- Children of the sunlight : stories of Australian circus life. Sydney: N.S.W. Bookstall. 1923 – via Trove.

New South Wales Legislative Assembly
Preceded by Francis Abigail	Member for West Sydney; 1891 – 1894; With: Black, Davis, Kelly	District abolished
Political offices
Preceded by Fred Flowers	Representative of the Government in the Legislative Council; 1915 – 1918	Succeeded by John Garland
Preceded by Fred Flowers	Vice-President of the Executive Council; 1915 – 1919	Succeeded by David Hall
Preceded by George Black	Minister of Public Health; 1916 – 1919	Succeeded by David Storey
New title	Minister for Local Government; 1916 – 1920	Succeeded by Thomas Mutch
Preceded by John Garland	Minister of Justice; 1919 – 1920	Succeeded by Edward McTiernan
Preceded by John Garland	Solicitor General for New South Wales; 1919 – 1920	Succeeded by Robert Sproule
