= Angus Cameron (Australian politician) =

Australian politician

Angus Cameron (1847 – 26 January 1896) was a Scottish-born Australian politician.

He was born in Edinburgh to railway porter Neil Cameron and Mary Young. The family migrated to New South Wales in 1854. He married Eleanor Lyons on 1 January 1876 at Waterloo and they had five children.

He first worked as a carpenter, quickly becoming involved in the union movement and becoming secretary of the Trades and Labor Council by 1873. In 1874 he was elected to the New South Wales Legislative Assembly as the Trades and Labor Council's endorsed candidate for West Sydney. In 1876 he disassociated himself from the Trades and Labor Council, and he was defeated in 1885. He was elected at the 1887 by-election for Kiama, but his first term lasted barely more than 1 week before Parliament was dissolved. Cameron was re-elected unopposed at the election on 9 February as a Free Trade candidate, but did not contest the 1889 election.

By now known as a strong temperance advocate, he returned to politics in 1894 as the member for Waverley, but he died in 1896.

New South Wales Legislative Assembly
Preceded by John Robertson; John Booth; Joseph Raphael; Joseph Wearne	Member for West Sydney; 1874–1885; With: John Robertson/Daniel O'Connor; Henry Dangar/John Harris/William Martin/George Merriman; George Dibbs/James Merriman/Francis Abigail	Succeeded by Daniel O'Connor; Francis Abigail; Alexander Kethel; John Young
Preceded by Harman Tarrant	Member for Kiama; 1887–1889	Succeeded by George Fuller
New district	Member for Waverley; 1894–1896	Succeeded by Thomas Jessep
