= Samuel Joseph (Australian politician) =

English-born Australian politician

Samuel Aaron Joseph (14 October 1824 – 25 September 1898) was an English-born Australian politician.

He was born in London to Aaron Steatham Joseph and Frances Cohen. He migrated to Wellington in New Zealand in 1843 and moved to Sydney in 1856. He married Matilda Phillipa Levien in 1856; they had three children. In Sydney he was a merchant and closely involved in the business community. In 1864 he was elected to the New South Wales Legislative Assembly for West Sydney, serving until his resignation in 1868 to travel to England. In 1882 he was appointed to the New South Wales Legislative Council; he left the Council in 1885 but returned in 1887, serving until 1893. Joseph died at Woollahra in 1898.

New South Wales Legislative Assembly
| Preceded by Daniel Dalgleish; Geoffrey Eagar; William Love | Member for West Sydney; 1864–1868; With: John Darvall / Geoffrey Eagar; John Lang; John Robertson / William Windeyer | Succeeded by William Campbell |
