= John Booth (Australian politician) =

Australian politician

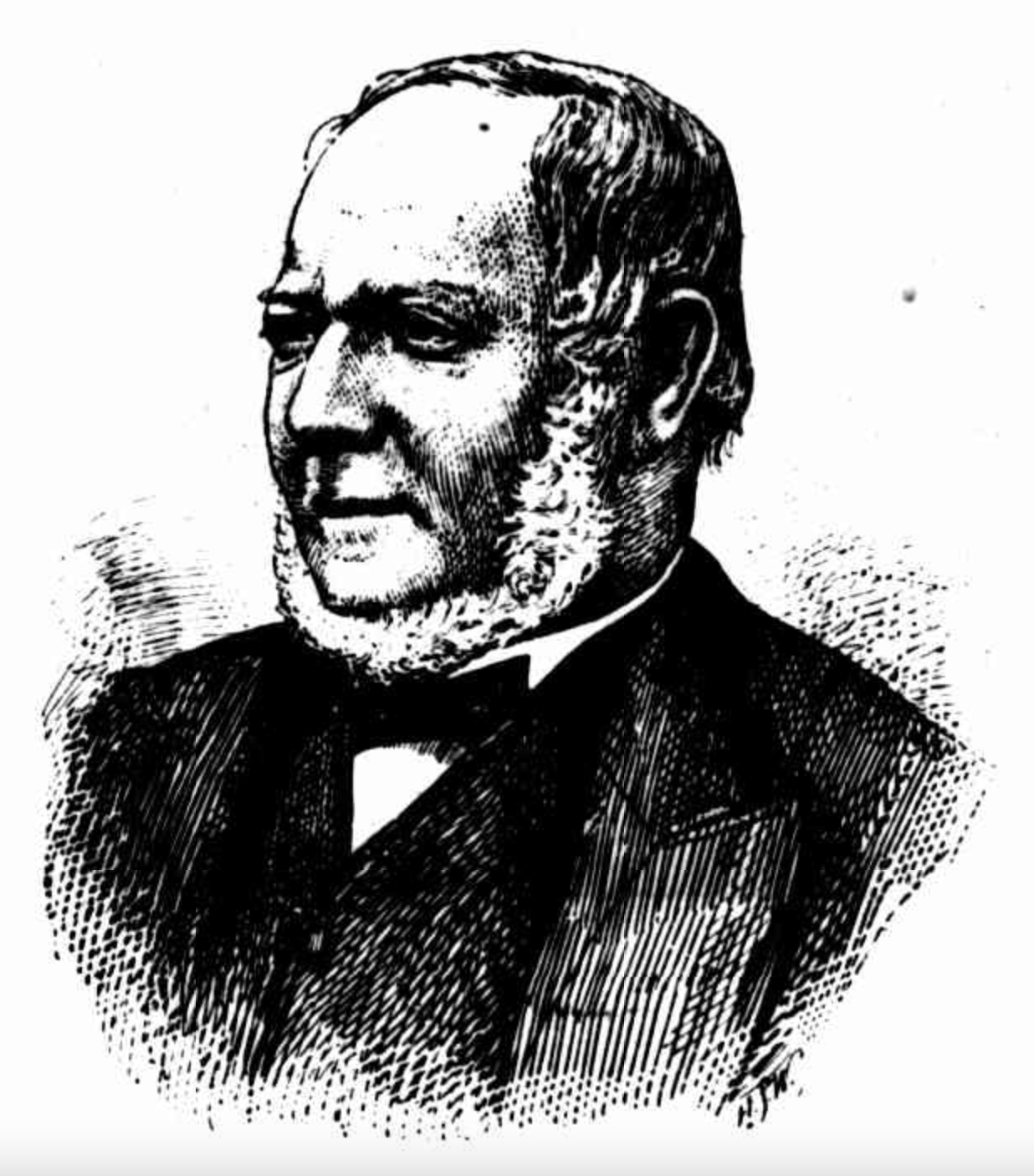
John Booth MLA

John Booth (27 February 1822 – 11 April 1898) was an English-born Australian politician.

He was born in Bermondsey in London; his father, Henry Booth, was a corn-factor. He went to sea in 1833, settled in Sydney in 1839 and learned shipbuilding on Brisbane Water, before moving to Balmain around 1854. In 1850 he married Susannah Wetherall, with whom he had eleven children. He was Balmain's first mayor in 1867 and by 1870 owned successful sawmills at Balmain and on the Manning River. He went to England in 1870, and in 1872 was elected to the New South Wales Legislative Assembly for West Sydney. Defeated in 1874, he was elected for East Macquarie later in the election period in 1875. In 1874 his mills were burned down, and despite only having partial insurance he rebuilt them. He was defeated running for re-election in 1877. Booth died at Bundanoon, where he owned property, in 1898.

Civic offices
| Preceded by Walter Church | Chairman of the Balmain Municipal Council; 1867 | Succeeded by Himself as Mayor of Balmain |
| Preceded by Himself as Chairman | Mayor of Balmain; 1867–1868 | Succeeded by Henry Perdriau |
New South Wales Legislative Assembly
| Preceded by William Speer; William Windeyer | Member for West Sydney; 1872–1874; Served alongside: Joseph Raphael, John Robertson, Joseph Wearne | Succeeded by Angus Cameron; Henry Dangar; George Dibbs |
| Preceded by Walter Cooper; William Cummings | Member for East Macquarie; 1875–1877; Served alongside: William Suttor, Jr. | Succeeded by John Robertson |
