= Geoffrey Eagar =

Australian politician

Personal details
- Born: 17 December 1818; Sydney, New South Wales
- Died: 12 September 1891 (aged 72)

Geoffrey Eagar (17 December 1818 – 12 September 1891) was an accountant and colonial politician and civil servant in New South Wales, Australia.

== Early life ==
Eagar was born in Sydney, son of Jemima née McDuel and Edward, a lawyer, emancipated convict and merchant. Edward left Australia in 1821, while Geoffrey was still an infant, to take a legal battle over the rights of freed convicts to London, and did not return. His mother Jemima them moved into a house on Macquarie Street provided for by William Wentworth, by whom she gave birth to a son. In 1843 he married Mary Ann Bucknell, and the couple had 4 children.

== Politics ==
Eagar worked as an accountant at the Bank of New South Wales from 1854 for around five years before resigning to accept an appointment to the New South Wales Legislative Council in September 1859. The following month he was appointed Secretary for Public Works and Representative of the Government in the Legislative Council in the Forster ministry, serving until the ministry's defeat in March 1860. He resigned from the Council in November 1860, to contest the election for The Glebe, but he finished a distant 3rd.

He was elected to the Legislative Assembly at the by-election in January 1863 for the seat of West Sydney. He was appointed Colonial Treasurer in the first Martin ministry in October 1863. He lost his seat at the 1864 election for West Sydney, and was unsuccessful at election for the Paterson. He was returned to the Legislative Assembly at the West Sydney by-election in July 1865, and in January 1866 was appointed Colonial Treasurer in the second Martin ministry, serving until the resignation of the ministry in October 1868. Eagar lost his seat again at the 1869 election for West Sydney, and was unsuccessful at the Hastings, and Goldfields West.

== Later life ==
After leaving parliament he was appointed head of the New South Wales Treasury from 1872, until his retirement in February 1891.

Eagar died at his home in the Sydney suburb of Glebe Point, survived by his wife and three of their four children, Arthur, a bank manager, Ernest a civil servant and a daughter. He also had a house in the Blue Mountains, opposite Eagar's Platform, now called Valley Heights railway station.

Political offices
Preceded by John Dickson	Representative of the Government in the Legislative Council; 1859 – 1860	Succeeded by John Hargrave
Preceded by Edward Flood	Secretary for Public Works; 1859 – 1860	Succeeded by William Arnold
Preceded by Thomas Smart	Colonial Treasurer; 1863 – 1865	Succeeded by Thomas Smart
Preceded by Marshall Burdekin	Colonial Treasurer; 1866 – 1868	Succeeded by Saul Samuel
New South Wales Legislative Assembly
Preceded by William Charles Windeyer	Member for West Sydney; 1863 – 1864; Served alongside: Lang, Dalgleish, Love	Succeeded by John Darvall
Preceded by John Darvall	Member for West Sydney; 1864 – 1869; Served alongside: Lang, Robertson/Windeyer, Joseph/Campbell	Succeeded by John Robertson
Government offices
Preceded by Henry Lane	Under Secretary for Finance and Trade; 1872 – 1891	Succeeded by Francis Kirkpatrick
