= William Charles Windeyer =

Australian politician (1834–1897)

Sir William Charles Windeyer
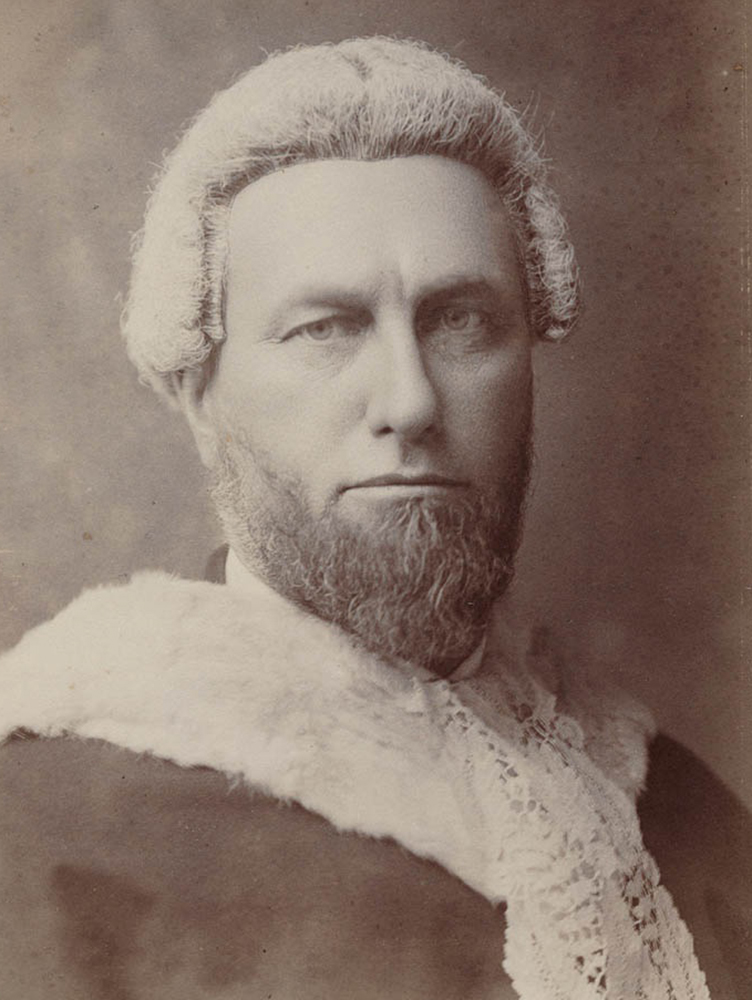
- Judge William Charles Windeyer, c. 1890, by Freeman and Co

6th Chancellor of the University of Sydney
- In office 1895–1896
- Preceded by: William Manning
- Succeeded by: Henry MacLaurin

6th Vice-Chancellor of the University of Sydney
- In office 1883–1886
- Preceded by: Robert Allwood
- Succeeded by: Henry MacLaurin

Justice of the Supreme Court of New South Wales
- In office August 1881 – 31 August 1896

16th Attorney General of New South Wales
- In office 22 March 1877 – 16 August 1877
- Preceded by: William Dalley
- Succeeded by: William Dalley
- In office 21 December 1878 – 10 August 1879
- Preceded by: William Foster
- Succeeded by: Robert Wisdom

14th Solicitor General for New South Wales
- In office 16 December 1870 – 13 May 1872
- Preceded by: Julian Salomons
- Succeeded by: Joseph Innes

Personal details
- Born: 29 September 1834 London, United Kingdom
- Died: 11 September 1897 (aged 62) Bologna, Italy
- Spouse(s): Mary Elizabeth, née Bolton
- Children: 5 daughters including Margaret; three sons including Richard and William
- Parent(s): Richard Windeyer; Maria Camfield
- Education: The King's School, Sydney
- Alma mater: University of Sydney

Sir William Charles Windeyer (29 September 1834 – 11 September 1897) was an Australian politician and judge.

As a New South Wales politician he was responsible for the creation of Belmore Park (north of the new Central railway constructed in 1874 in Haymarket), Lang Park (in Church Hill, between York, Lang and Grosvenor Streets in the city), Observatory Park (on Flagstaff Hill in the west Rocks) and Cromwell Park at the head of Long Bay, Malabar and parks on Clark, Rodd, and Snapper Islands. He was also the author of the New South Wales Patents Act and the Married Women's Property Act of 1879.

== Early life ==
Windeyer was born in London as the only child of Richard Windeyer and Maria Camfield.

== Political career ==
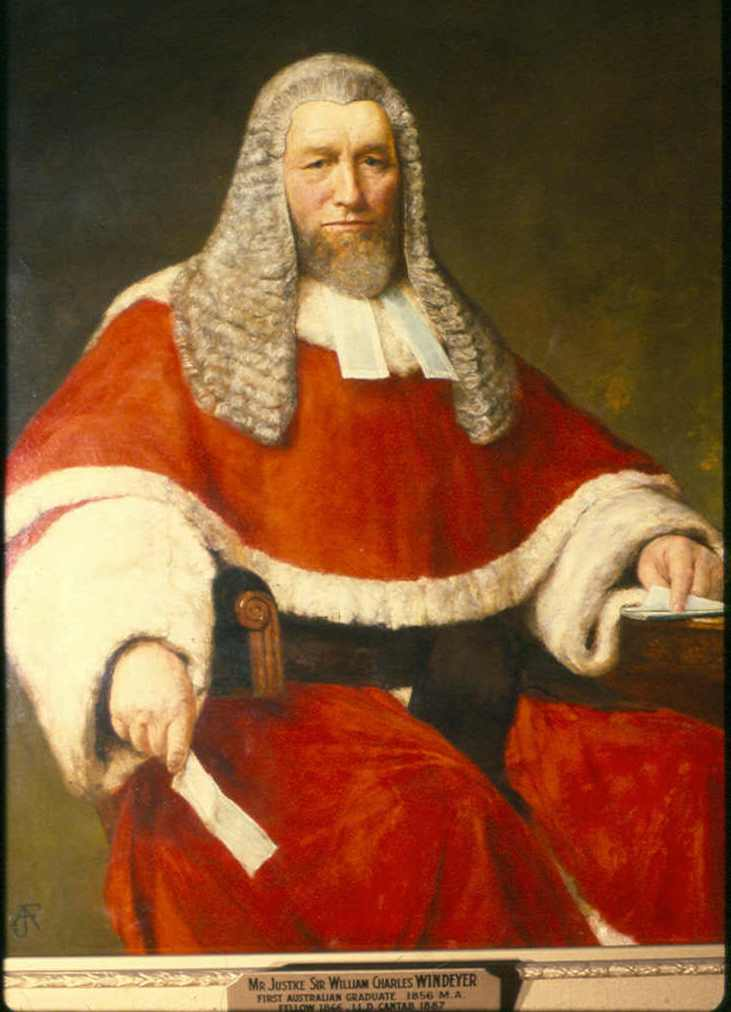
MrJusticeSirWilliamCharlesWindeyer

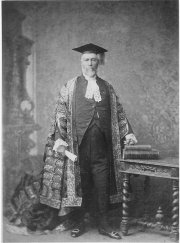
Sir William Charles Windeyer as Chancellor of the University of Sydney.

On 16 December 1870 Windeyer became Solicitor General in the third Martin ministry and held this position until 13 May 1872.

== Judge and educationalist ==
Windeyer was appointed as acting judge of the Supreme Court in August 1879. In August 1881 he became a puisne judge of the supreme court, and held this position for almost 15 years. He believed strongly in the enforcement of the criminal law, particularly where the victims were women. In the Mount Rennie rape case, he sentenced nine young men to death for pack rape, and four were in fact hanged in 1887. Ian Barker QC described the trial as being run in an oppressive manner, with the defence counsel not commencing their address to the jury until after midnight and that Windeyer was biased against the accused. In 1895 Windeyer caused controversy by imposing the death penalty on George Dean for attempting to poison his wife. There was a strong belief that Dean was innocent and that his wife and her mother (who was a woman of ill repute) had conspired against him. Although, Dean was very likely guilty, his death sentence was commuted and he was later released on a free pardon. He was subsequently convicted of perjury and spent nine years in jail. Windeyer resigned on 31 August 1896, prior to his trip to Europe.

== Death ==
His daughter Margaret was a librarian and women's rights campaigner.

Parliament of New South Wales
Political offices
Preceded by Julian Salomons	Solicitor General; 1870 – 1872	Succeeded by Joseph Innes
Preceded by William Dalley	Attorney General; Mar – Aug 1877	Succeeded by William Dalley
Preceded by William Foster	Attorney General; Dec 1878 – Aug 1879	Succeeded by Robert Wisdom
New South Wales Legislative Assembly
New seat	Member for Lower Hunter; 1859–1860	Succeeded by Alexander Scott
Preceded by Thomas Broughton; James Pemell; John Plunkett	Member for West Sydney; 1860–1862; With: Daniel Dalgleish; John Lang; William Love	Succeeded by Geoffrey Eagar
Preceded by John Robertson	Member for West Sydney; 1866–1872; With: Geoffrey Eagar / John Robertson; Samuel Joseph / William Campbell / Joseph Wearne; John Lang / William Speer	Succeeded by John Booth; Joseph Raphael
New seat	Member for University of Sydney; 1876–1879	Succeeded by Edmund Barton
Academic offices
Preceded by William Manning	Chancellor of the University of Sydney; 1895 – 1896	Succeeded by Henry MacLaurin
Preceded by Robert Allwood	Vice-Chancellor of the University of Sydney; 1883 – 1886	Succeeded by Henry MacLaurin
