= John Robertson (premier) =

Australian politician (1816–1891)

The Honourable Sir John Robertson KCMG
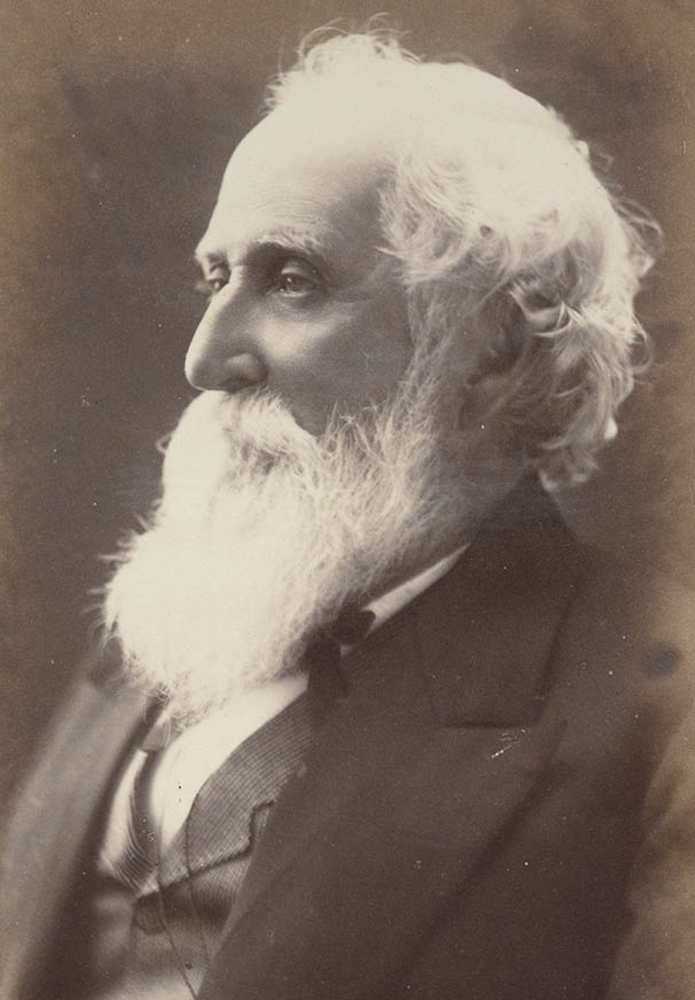
- Portrait of Sir John Robertson, c. 1890

5th Premier of New South Wales
- In office 9 March 1860 – 9 January 1861
- Preceded by: William Forster
- Succeeded by: Charles Cowper
- In office 27 October 1868 – 12 January 1870
- Preceded by: James Martin
- Succeeded by: Charles Cowper
- In office 9 February 1875 – 21 March 1877
- Preceded by: Henry Parkes
- Succeeded by: Henry Parkes
- In office 17 August – 17 December 1877
- Preceded by: Henry Parkes
- Succeeded by: James Farnell
- In office 22 December 1885 – 22 February 1886
- Preceded by: George Dibbs
- Succeeded by: Sir Patrick Jennings

Personal details
- Born: 15 October 1816 Bow, Middlesex, England
- Died: 8 May 1891 (aged 74) Watsons Bay, Sydney, Australia
- Spouse: Margaret Emma "Madge" Davies
- Children: 9

Sir John Robertson KCMG (15 October 1816 – 8 May 1891) was a London-born Australian politician and Premier of New South Wales on five occasions. Robertson is best remembered for land reform and in particular the Robertson Land Acts of 1861, which sought to open up the selection of Crown land and break the monopoly of the squatters.

Robertson was elected to Parliament in 1856 supporting manhood suffrage, secret ballot, electorates based on equal populations, abolition of state aid to religion, government non-denominational schools, free trade, and land reform. He saw free selection of crown land before survey as the key to social reform with poor settlers being able to occupy agricultural and pastoral land, even that occupied by lease-holding squatters. This insight enabled him to dominate the politics of 1856–61.

== Biography ==
Robertson was born at Bow, London, the fourth child and third son of James Robertson, a watchmaker and pastoralist from Scotland, and English woman Anna Marie Ripley, who married in Stepney, London in 1809. Subsequently, on the advice of Sir Thomas Brisbane, the then Governor of New South Wales, the family emigrated to Australia, arriving on the "Providence" on 8 January 1822. They were apparently in good circumstances, for, according to the custom of the time, anyone bringing to the colony a sum of not less than £2,500 was entitled to a first class grant of 2500 acres (10 km^{2}) of land, and this they received in the Hunter Valley.

James Robertson senior worked as a watchmaker and silversmith, and became Supervisor of Governor Brisbane's astronomical instruments and clocks at the government observatory in the Parramatta Domain. He received a 35 hectare grant of land at Robertson's Point (subsequently Cremorne Point), on the north shore of Sydney Harbour.

At five years of age the young Robertson was sent to the new school in Sydney just opened by John Dunmore Lang. He subsequently attended schools kept by Bradley Gilchrist and W. T. Cape. Among his schoolfellows were two other boys also destined to become premiers of New South Wales, James Martin and William Forster. On leaving school about the year 1833 Robertson went to sea and worked his passage to England where, through the medium of some letters of introduction, he accidentally came in contact with Lord Palmerston. The personality of the young man so impressed Palmerston that he invited him to stay with him for a few days in the country. There he introduced him to various distinguished people, and afterwards, when he was leaving England, gave him a letter to the New South Wales governor, Sir Richard Bourke.

Robertson visited France and South America, and, after an absence of two years, left the sea and joined his family in northern New South Wales. He engaged in grazing and the farming of crops for some years. He married Margaret Emma "Madge" Davies when he was 22; they were to have three sons and six daughters. In 1842 he successfully submitted the protests of squatters to Governor Sir George Gipps, whose civil servants had attempted to restrict the expansion of grazing in northwestern New South Wales.

== Parliamentary career ==
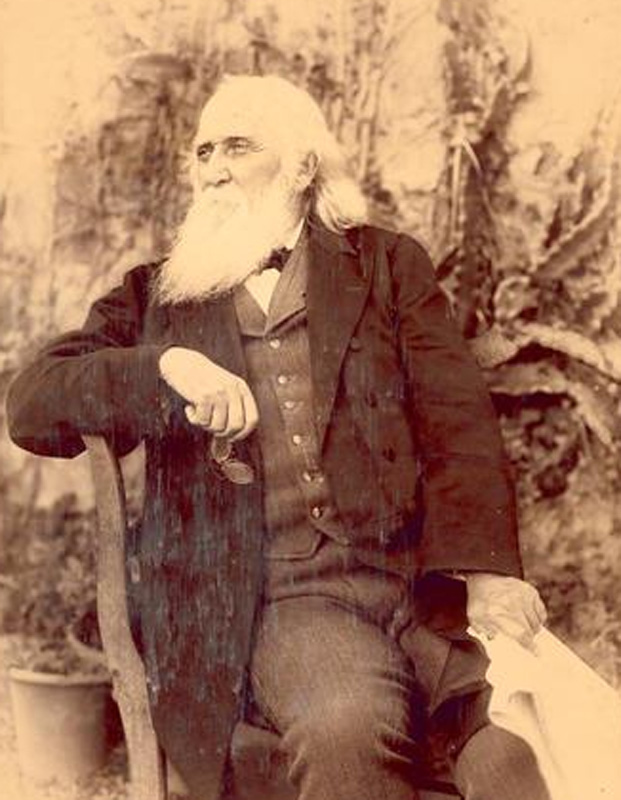
Sir John Robertson, c. 1890

With the establishment of responsible government in 1856, Robertson stood for the Legislative Assembly seat of Phillip, Brisbane and Bligh, promising manhood suffrage, secret ballot, electorates based on equal populations, abolition of state aid to religion, government non-denominational schools, free trade, and free selection of crown lands before survey. Although unable to campaign due to poor health he easily defeated his conservative opponent, sitting with other liberals in the new parliament, and soon becoming their leader. He was convinced that agriculture was being unfairly handicapped by the land laws, and believed that social equilibrium could be achieved through land reform, gaining great support in both urban and rural areas as a result.

In January 1858, he joined the second Cowper ministry as Secretary for Lands and Public Works. He was largely responsible for amending the electoral law to introduce adult male franchise, increase Legislative Assembly seats from 54 to 80, although eight of these were abolished when Queensland separated in late 1859. It also included a seat for the University of Sydney once it had 100 graduates, which did not occur to 1876. In the June 1859 general election, he was re-elected to his seat, now called Upper Hunter. The Cowper government was defeated in October 1859, partly as a result of Robertson's opposition to the education bill. The succeeding Forster government was forced to resign when it lost a parliamentary vote in February 1860.

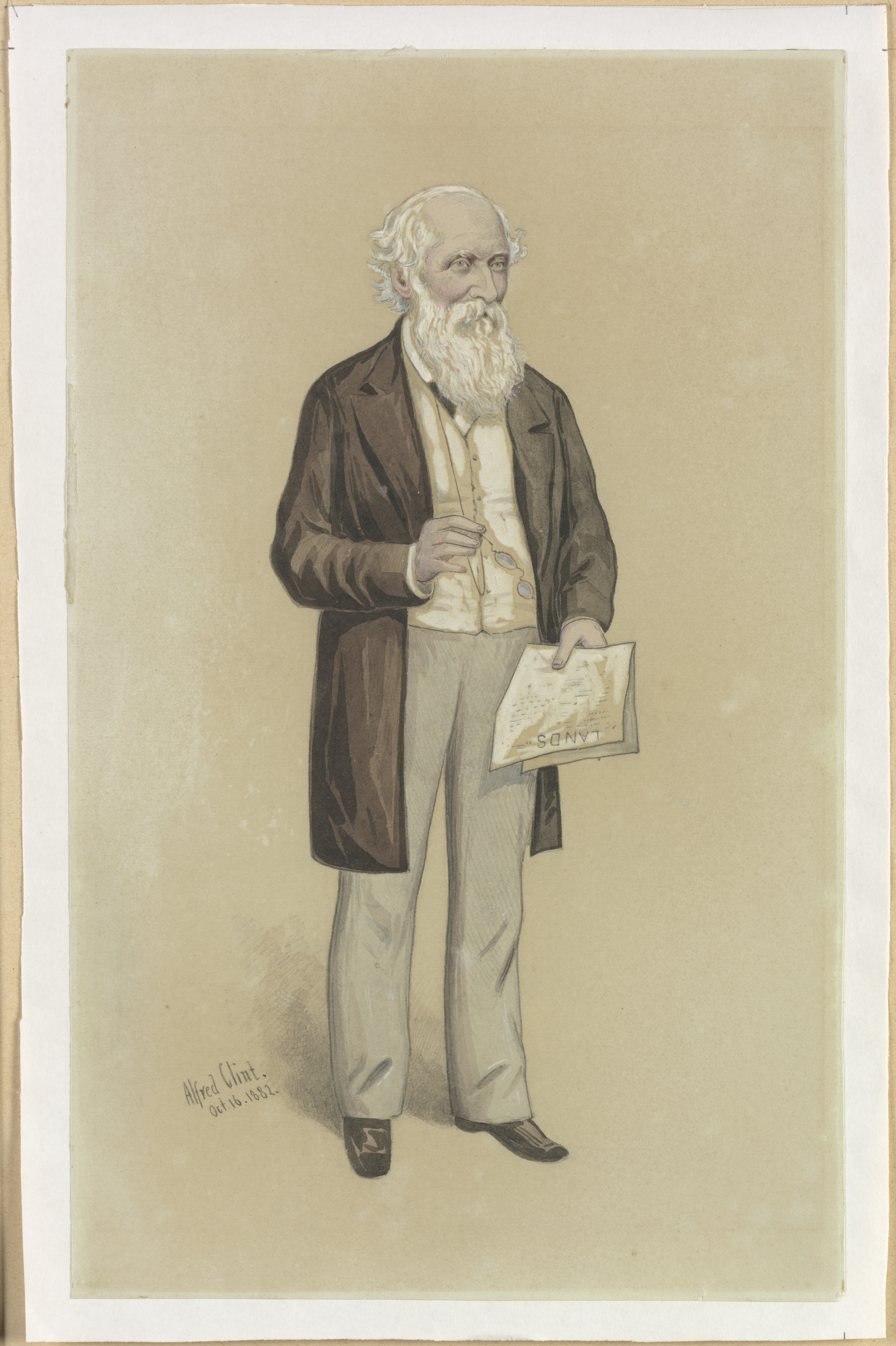
Robertson by Alfred Clint, 1882

== First ministry and land reform ==
Robertson became Premier, in March 1860 and completed the drafting of legislation to put into effect his land reforms, the Crown Lands Alienation bill and the Crown Lands Occupation bill, which allowed free selection before survey. These bills were defeated in committee in October. This enabled him to obtain a dissolution from Governor Denison and to fight an election on the issue in December, which gave him a clear majority in the Legislative Assembly, all the candidates who publicly opposed land reform having been defeated.

Robertson handed over the Premiership to Cowper on 10 January 1861, while Robertson concentrated on the land bills as Secretary for Lands. He had his land bills passed by the Assembly on 27 March and resigned from the Assembly so that he could be appointed to the Legislative Council on 3 April to complete the process. As the council was resolutely opposed to the land bills, he persuaded Premier to ask the new Governor Sir John Young to swamp the council with 21 new members.

Before administering the oath to the new members the President of the council, William Westbrooke Burton, announced his resignation and left the chamber. Other members followed his example, there was no quorum, and on the same day Parliament was prorogued. The five-year terms of the 1856 Council appointments had run out and the Governor appointed a new Council to life terms, including Robertson. Due to the reappointment of Council, the land bills had to be passed again by the Assembly in September and were passed by the Council in October 1861. The resulting act remained the law of the country for many years.

Robertson resigned from the Council in December 1861 and John Garrett resigned the seat of Shoalhaven to allow him to win it at a by-election in January 1862. He successfully contested the seat of West Sydney, a working class electorate, in the November 1864 general election. In February 1865, he was appointed as Secretary for Lands again in the fourth Cowper ministry. He resigned from Parliament to sort out his financial difficulties through the failure of some properties he held in northern Queensland in October 1865, but he was renominated to fill the vacancy eight days later.

In the January 1866 election, he was defeated in West Sydney, due to opposition to the Government's policy of preserving some crown land for public purposes, such as water supply, and to a false claim, reported by the Sydney Morning Herald, that he was "the President of the Fenian Society". Martin compared him to Tiberius Gracchus: "both advocated the cause of free selection, both hit upon the same amount of land for each individual … [and] both had been the idols of the people … [and] deserted by the people." He won a by-election for Clarence in August 1866, and represented it to November 1869.

== Second ministry ==
In January 1868, holding the offices of Premier and Colonial Secretary, Robertson formed his second ministry and he won back West Sydney in the December 1869 general election. He was unable to get any of his own legislation passed and relinquished the premiership but to Cowper in January 1870 and in February, he was forced to resign from Parliament due to bankruptcy. A committee was formed to raise and invest funds to sort out his financial problems and he won back West Sydney in March and discharged his bankruptcy in August.

Robertson rejoined the ministry in August 1870 as Secretary for Lands. This government had a very small majority in the house, and when Cowper was appointed agent-general in London it resigned. Sir James Martin was sent for and to the surprise of the country Robertson joined him as Colonial Secretary in his ministry. At the general election held early in 1872, three members of the government were defeated, and Henry Parkes came into power on 14 May 1872, there was a constant struggle between the parties under Robertson and Parkes for some years.

== Third and fourth ministries ==
Robertson was Premier again in February 1875, Parkes in March 1877, Robertson in August 1877; but this ministry only lasted until December. He called an election in November 1877, at which he was beaten in West Sydney, but won Mudgee and East Macquarie and chose to represent Mudgee until December 1878.

The coming-in of the Farnell ministry in 1877 gave the main contestants time to take breath and consider the position, and in December 1878 a coalition was made between Parkes and Robertson which led to an effective ministry which lasted for over four years and had unprecedented success in passing legislation. Parkes was Premier, and Robertson went to the Legislative Council as Vice-President of the Executive Council and Representative of the Government in the Legislative Council.

In 1879, he founded the Royal National Park. During Parkes's absence in England, between December 1881 and August 1882, Robertson was acting-Premier and Colonial Secretary. On 31 December 1881, he resigned from the Legislative Council and was returned as member for Mudgee at a by-election in January 1882. The general election held in December 1882 was adverse to the government and it resigned.

== Fifth ministry and retirement ==
Robertson formed his fifth ministry in December 1885 but resigned in the following February. He was a trustee of the Royal National Park and he injured his leg while working on it, which increased his depression and this together with his poor finances led him to retire from parliament in June 1886. A grant of £10,000 was made to him by the government. Henceforth he lived in retirement, his health was impaired and he was unable to take part in public life. He was strongly against federation, largely on the grounds it would amount to the annexation of New South Wales by the other colonies, and led the Sydney campaign against the constitutional convention of 1891. Almost his last act was the sending of a letter opposing it to the Sydney Morning Herald, which appeared on the day preceding his death.

== Death ==
Sir John Robertson died in Watsons Bay and was accorded a public funeral.

== Honours ==
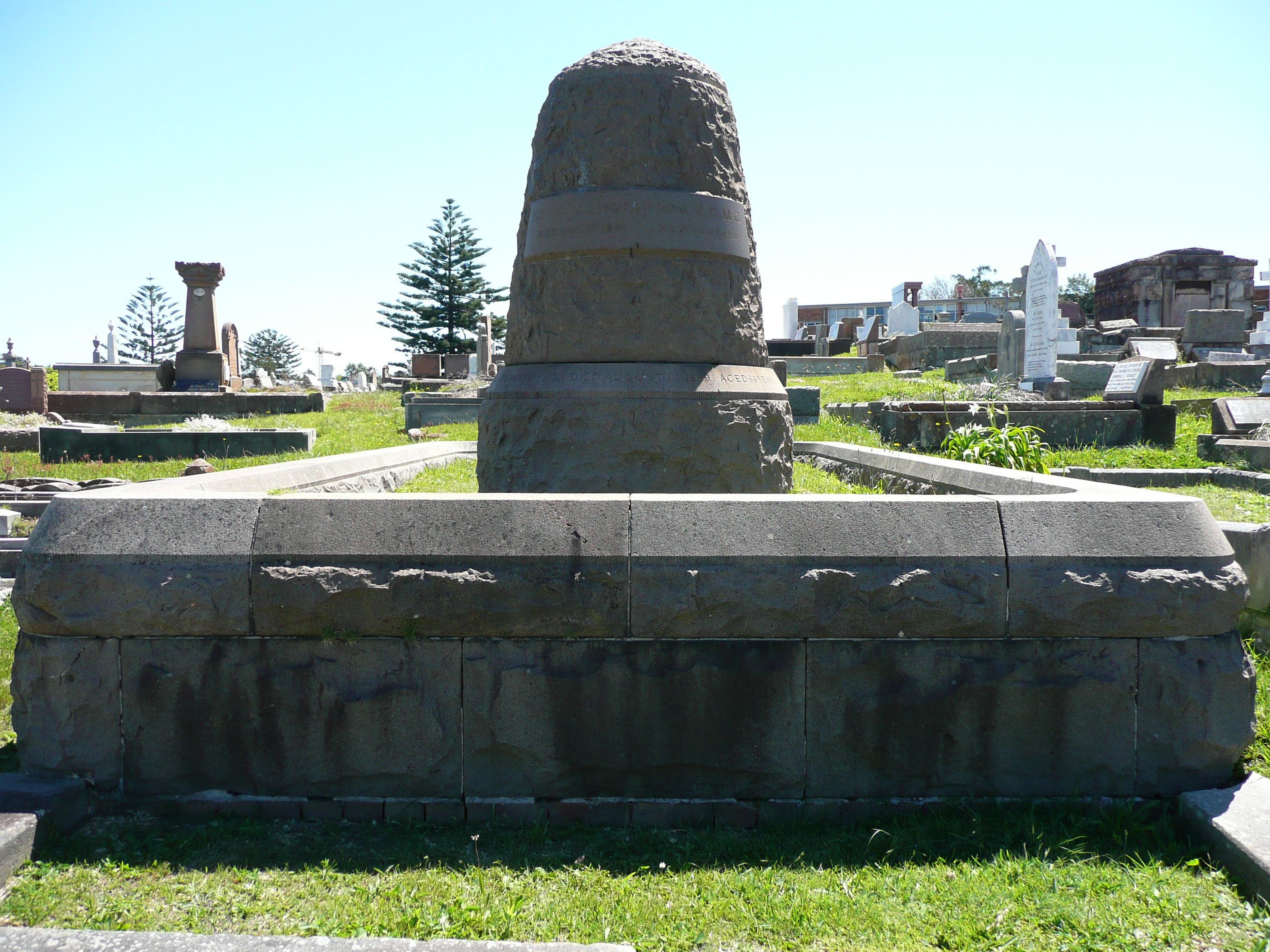
John Robertson Memorial, South Head Cemetery, Vaucluse, New South Wales, designed by John Horbury Hunt

He was made a Knight Commander of the Order of St Michael and St George (KCMG) in 1877. His statue graces The Domain near the Art Gallery of New South Wales. The Federal division of Robertson, the former state electoral district of Robertson, and the NSW Southern Highlands town of Robertson were all named after him.

One of his daughters, Margaret-Emma, married the Russian scientist and explorer Nicholas Miklouho-Maclay, who built the first Marine Biological Station in Australia at Watsons Bay.

One of his grandchildren, Archibald Clark Kerr, later Sir Archibald and then later Lord Inverchapel, became one of Britain's most influential 20th century diplomats.

Political offices
Preceded by William Forster	Premier of New South Wales; 1860–1861	Succeeded by Charles Cowper
Preceded by James Martin	Premier of New South Wales; 1868–1870	Succeeded by Charles Cowper
Preceded by Henry Parkes	Premier of New South Wales; 1875–1877	Succeeded by Henry Parkes
Preceded by Henry Parkes	Premier of New South Wales; 1877	Succeeded by James Farnell
Preceded by George Dibbs	Premier of New South Wales; 1885–1886	Succeeded by Patrick Jennings
New South Wales Legislative Assembly
Preceded by New seat	Member for Phillip, Brisbane and Bligh; 1856–1859	Succeeded by Seat abolished
Preceded by New seat	Member for Upper Hunter; 1859–1861	Succeeded by Thomas Dangar
Preceded by John Garrett	Member for Shoalhaven; 1862–1864	Succeeded by Thomas Garrett
Preceded by Daniel Dalgleish	Member for West Sydney; 1864–1866; Served alongside: Lang, Darvall/Eagar, Joseph	Succeeded by William Windeyer
Preceded by John Laycock	Member for Clarence; 1866–1869	Succeeded by Thomas Bawden
Preceded by Geoffrey Eagar	Member for West Sydney; 1869–1877; Served alongside: Speer/Raphael/Dangar, Windeyer/Booth/Cameron, Wearne/Dibbs	Succeeded by Daniel O'Connor
Preceded by John Booth	Member for East Macquarie; 1877–1878; Served alongside: Suttor	Succeeded by Edmund Webb
Preceded by Richard Rouse	Member for Mudgee; 1877–1878	Succeeded by Richard Rouse
Preceded by Samuel Terry	Member for Mudgee; 1882–1886; Served alongside: Buchanan/Browne, Beyers/Taylor	Succeeded by William Wall
