= Electoral district of West Sydney =

Former state electoral district of New South Wales, Australia

West Sydney was an electoral district for the Legislative Assembly in the Australian State of New South Wales created in 1859 from part of the electoral district of Sydney, covering the western part of the current Sydney central business district, Ultimo and Pyrmont, bordered by George Street, Broadway, Bay Street and Wentworth Park. It elected four members simultaneously, with voters casting four votes and the first four candidates being elected. For the 1894 election, it was replaced by the single-member electorates of Sydney-Gipps, Sydney-Lang, Sydney-Denison and Sydney-Pyrmont.

== Members for West Sydney ==
| Member | Party | Period | Member | Party | Period | Member | Party | Period | Member | Party | Period |
|---|---|---|---|---|---|---|---|---|---|---|---|
| John Lang | None | 1859–1869 | James Pemell | None | 1859–1860 | John Plunkett | None | 1859–1860 | Thomas Broughton | None | 1859–1860 |
| John Lang | None | 1859–1869 | William Windeyer | None | 1860–1862 | Daniel Dalgleish | None | 1860–1864 | William Love | None | 1860–1864 |
| John Lang | None | 1859–1869 | Geoffrey Eagar | None | 1863–1864 | Daniel Dalgleish | None | 1860–1864 | William Love | None | 1860–1864 |
| John Lang | None | 1859–1869 | John Darvall | None | 1864–1865 | John Robertson | None | 1864–1866 | Samuel Joseph | None | 1864–1868 |
| John Lang | None | 1859–1869 | Geoffrey Eagar | None | 1865–1869 | John Robertson | None | 1864–1866 | Samuel Joseph | None | 1864–1868 |
| John Lang | None | 1859–1869 | Geoffrey Eagar | None | 1865–1869 | William Windeyer | None | 1866–1872 | Samuel Joseph | None | 1864–1868 |
| John Lang | None | 1859–1869 | Geoffrey Eagar | None | 1865–1869 | William Windeyer | None | 1866–1872 | William Campbell | None | 1868–1869 |
| William Speer | None | 1869–1872 | John Robertson | None | 1869–1877 | William Windeyer | None | 1866–1872 | Joseph Wearne | None | 1869–1874 |
| Joseph Raphael | None | 1872–1874 | John Robertson | None | 1869–1877 | John Booth | None | 1872–1874 | Joseph Wearne | None | 1869–1874 |
| Henry Dangar | None | 1874–1877 | John Robertson | None | 1869–1877 | Angus Cameron | None | 1874–1885 | George Dibbs | None | 1874–1877 |
| John Harris | None | 1877–1880 | Daniel O'Connor | None | 1877–1887 | Angus Cameron | None | 1874–1885 | James Merriman | None | 1877–1880 |
| William Martin | None | 1880–1882 | Daniel O'Connor | None | 1877–1887 | Angus Cameron | None | 1874–1885 | Francis Abigail | None | 1880–1887 |
| George Merriman | None | 1882–1885 | Daniel O'Connor | None | 1877–1887 | Angus Cameron | None | 1874–1885 | Francis Abigail | None | 1880–1887 |
| John Young | None | 1885–1887 | Daniel O'Connor | None | 1877–1887 | Alexander Kethel | None | 1885–1887 | Francis Abigail | None | 1880–1887 |
| George Merriman | Free Trade | 1887–1889 | Daniel O'Connor | Free Trade | 1887–1891 | Alexander Kethel | Free Trade | 1887–1889 | Francis Abigail | Free Trade | 1887–1891 |
| Alfred Lamb | Free Trade | 1889–1890 | Daniel O'Connor | Free Trade | 1887–1891 | Thomas Playfair | Free Trade | 1889–1891 | Francis Abigail | Free Trade | 1887–1891 |
| Adolphus Taylor | Independent | 1890–1891 | Daniel O'Connor | Free Trade | 1887–1891 | Thomas Playfair | Free Trade | 1889–1891 | Francis Abigail | Free Trade | 1887–1891 |
| Thomas Davis | Labor | 1891–1894 | George Black | Labor | 1891–1894 | Andrew Kelly | Labor | 1891–1894 | Jack FitzGerald | Labor | 1891–1894 |

== Election results ==
1891 New South Wales colonial election: West Sydney Wednesday 17 June
| Party | Candidate | Votes | % | ±% |
|---|---|---|---|---|
| Labour | Jack FitzGerald (elected 1) | 4,174 | 15.8 | |
| Labour | George Black (elected 2) | 4,078 | 15.4 | |
| Labour | Andrew Kelly (elected 3) | 3,798 | 14.3 | |
| Labour | Thomas Davis (elected 4) | 2,730 | 10.3 | |
| Protectionist | John Young | 2,601 | 9.8 | |
| Free Trade | Thomas Playfair (defeated) | 2,535 | 9.6 | |
| Free Trade | Daniel O'Connor (defeated) | 2,493 | 9.4 | |
| Free Trade | Francis Abigail (defeated) | 2,326 | 8.8 | |
| Free Trade | Frederick Woolcott-Waley | 1,745 | 6.6 | |
| Total formal votes | | 26,480 | 99.8 | |
| Informal votes | | 66 | 0.3 | |
| Turnout | | 7,428 | 68.6 | |
| Labour gain 3 from Free Trade and gain 1 from Independent | | | | |

Adolphus Taylor (Independent) did not contest the election.
