= Electoral results for the district of Hawkesbury =

Election results for Hawkesbury, New South Wales, Australia

Hawkesbury, an electoral district of the Legislative Assembly in the Australian state of New South Wales, has had two incarnations, the first from 1859 to 1920, the second from 1927 until the present.

== Members for Hawkesbury ==
First incarnation (1859–1920)
Election	Member	Party	Member	Party
1859	William Piddington	None	John Darvall	None
1860	William Piddington	None	James Cunneen	None
1864	William Piddington	None	James Cunneen	None
1869	William Piddington	None	Henry Moses	None
1872	William Piddington	None	Henry Moses	None
1874	William Piddington	None	Henry Moses	None
1877 by	William Piddington	None	Henry Moses	None
1877	Alexander Bowman	None	Henry Moses	None
1880	Alexander Bowman	None		
1882	Henry McQuade	None		
1885	Alexander Bowman	None		
1887	Alexander Bowman	Free Trade		
1889	Alexander Bowman	Free Trade		
1891	Alexander Bowman	Free Trade		
1892 by	Sydney Burdekin	Free Trade		
1894	William Morgan	Ind. Free Trade		
1895	William Morgan	Free Trade		
1898	William Morgan	Free Trade		
1901	Brinsley Hall	Progressive		
1903	Brinsley Hall	Progressive		
1907	Brinsley Hall	Liberal Reform		
1910	Brinsley Hall	Liberal Reform		
1913	Brinsley Hall	Liberal Reform		
1917	Bruce Walker Sr	Independent		
Second incarnation (1927–present)
Election	Member	Party		
1927	Bruce Walker Sr	Nationalist		
1930	Bruce Walker Sr	Nationalist		
1932	Bruce Walker Jr	United Australia		
1935	Bruce Walker Jr	United Australia		
1938	Bruce Walker Jr	United Australia		
1941	Frank Finnan	Labor		
1944	Frank Finnan	Labor		
1947	Frank Finnan	Labor		
1950	Bernie Deane	Liberal		
1953	Bernie Deane	Liberal		
1956	Bernie Deane	Liberal		
1959	Bernie Deane	Liberal		
1962	Bernie Deane	Liberal		
1965	Bernie Deane	Liberal		
1968	Bernie Deane	Liberal		
1971	Bernie Deane	Liberal		
1973	Kevin Rozzoli	Liberal		
1976	Kevin Rozzoli	Liberal		
1978	Kevin Rozzoli	Liberal		
1981	Kevin Rozzoli	Liberal		
1984	Kevin Rozzoli	Liberal		
1988	Kevin Rozzoli	Liberal		
1991	Kevin Rozzoli	Liberal		
1995	Kevin Rozzoli	Liberal		
1999	Kevin Rozzoli	Liberal		
2003	Steven Pringle	Liberal		
2007	Ray Williams	Liberal		
2011	Ray Williams	Liberal		
2015	Dominic Perrottet	Liberal		
2019	Robyn Preston	Liberal		
2023	Robyn Preston	Liberal		

== Election results ==
=== Elections in the 2020s ===
==== 2023 ====
2023 New South Wales state election: Hawkesbury
Party	Candidate	Votes	%	±%
Liberal	Robyn Preston	23,283	43.8	−6.8
Labor	Amanda Kotlash	13,532	25.4	+5.7
One Nation	Susane Popovski	5,476	10.3	+10.3
Greens	Danielle Wheeler	3,977	7.5	+1.2
Independent	Angela Maguire	2,275	4.3	+4.3
Small Business	Eddie Dogramaci	2,025	3.8	+3.8
Independent	Tony Pettitt	1,486	2.8	+2.8
Sustainable Australia	Elissa Carrey	1,125	2.1	−0.4
Total formal votes		53,179	95.7	−0.4
Informal votes		2,368	4.3	+0.4
Turnout		55,547	90.8	+1.7
Two-party-preferred result
Liberal	Robyn Preston	26,004	59.8	−6.7
Labor	Amanda Kotlash	17,460	40.2	+6.7
Liberal hold		Swing	−6.7	

=== Elections in the 2010s ===
==== 2019 ====
2019 New South Wales state election: Hawkesbury
Party	Candidate	Votes	%	±%
Liberal	Robyn Preston	25,127	51.34	−5.27
Labor	Peter Reynolds	9,325	19.05	−3.39
Shooters, Fishers, Farmers	Shane Djuric	4,385	8.96	+8.96
Greens	Danielle Wheeler	3,102	6.34	−1.20
Independent	Marie-Jeanne Bowyer	2,290	4.68	+4.68
Animal Justice	Sarah Coogans	1,394	2.85	+2.85
Independent	Eddie Dogramaci	1,312	2.68	+2.68
Sustainable Australia	Elissa Carrey	1,217	2.49	+2.49
Keep Sydney Open	Perran Costi	789	1.61	+1.61
Total formal votes		48,941	96.13	+0.34
Informal votes		1,972	3.87	−0.34
Turnout		50,913	91.32	−0.89
Two-party-preferred result
Liberal	Robyn Preston	26,935	67.48	−0.30
Labor	Peter Reynolds	12,982	32.52	+0.30
Liberal hold		Swing	−0.30	

==== 2015 ====
2015 New South Wales state election: Hawkesbury
Party	Candidate	Votes	%	±%
Liberal	Dominic Perrottet	26,530	56.6	−9.9
Labor	Barry Calvert	10,520	22.4	+7.1
Greens	Danielle Wheeler	3,534	7.5	−2.8
Independent	Kate Mackaness	2,845	6.1	+6.1
Christian Democrats	Caroline Fraser	1,250	2.7	−1.1
No Land Tax	Victor Alberts	935	2.0	+2.0
Independent	Ralph Harlander	733	1.6	+1.6
Australia First	Tania Rollinson	518	1.1	+1.1
Total formal votes		46,865	95.8	−0.2
Informal votes		2,063	4.2	+0.2
Turnout		48,928	92.2	+4.6
Two-party-preferred result
Liberal	Dominic Perrottet	27,866	67.8	−10.6
Labor	Barry Calvert	13,246	32.2	+10.6
Liberal hold		Swing	−10.6	

==== 2011 ====
2011 New South Wales state election: Hawkesbury
Party	Candidate	Votes	%	±%
Liberal	Ray Williams	35,793	75.4	+29.7
Labor	Peter Wicks	5,276	11.1	−4.9
Greens	Leigh Williams	4,705	9.9	+3.4
Christian Democrats	Muriel Sultana	1,726	3.6	+3.6
Total formal votes		47,500	97.3	−0.1
Informal votes		1,300	2.7	+0.1
Turnout		48,800	95.1	
Two-party-preferred result
Liberal	Ray Williams	37,401	84.7	+28.7
Labor	Peter Wicks	6,755	15.3	+15.3
Liberal hold		Swing	+28.7	

=== Elections in the 2000s ===
==== 2007 ====
2007 New South Wales state election: Hawkesbury
Party	Candidate	Votes	%	±%
Liberal	Ray Williams	19,611	45.6	−1.6
Independent	Steven Pringle	11,661	27.1	+27.1
Labor	Alicia McCosker	6,872	16.0	−6.9
Greens	Jocelyn Howden	2,785	6.5	+0.1
AAFI	Gregg Pringle	2,069	4.8	+3.1
Total formal votes		42,998	97.4	−0.1
Informal votes		1,135	2.6	+0.1
Turnout		44,133	94.1	
Notional two-party-preferred count
Liberal	Ray Williams	23,217	69.3	+4.8
Labor	Alicia McCosker	10,273	30.7	−4.8
Two-candidate-preferred result
Liberal	Ray Williams	20,402	56.0	−8.6
Independent	Steven Pringle	16,012	44.0	+44.0
Liberal hold		Swing	−8.6 (Note: In 2003, Hawkesbury was won by Steve Pringle, representing the Liberals on a 14.6% margin against Labor. In 2006, he defected from the Liberals to become an Independent.)	

==== 2003 ====
2003 New South Wales state election: Hawkesbury
Party	Candidate	Votes	%	±%
Liberal	Steven Pringle	19,751	44.4	−3.0
Labor	Carl Bazeley	9,582	21.5	−3.4
Independent	Rex Stubbs	5,570	12.5	+12.5
Greens	Laurie Fraser	3,182	7.1	+1.8
Independent	John Griffiths	3,132	7.0	+7.0
Independent	Judy Pope	1,140	2.6	+2.6
One Nation	Noeline Saxiones	794	1.8	−7.5
AAFI	Hugh McNaught	756	1.7	+0.5
Democrats	Bruce van de Weg	446	1.0	−3.7
Unity	Ngoc Vuong	157	0.4	+0.4
Total formal votes		44,510	97.4	−0.4
Informal votes		1,204	2.6	+0.4
Turnout		45,714	92.8	
Two-party-preferred result
Liberal	Steven Pringle	22,037	64.1	+0.8
Labor	Carl Bazeley	12,367	35.9	−0.8
Liberal hold		Swing	+0.8	

=== Elections in the 1990s ===
==== 1999 ====
1999 New South Wales state election: Hawkesbury
Party	Candidate	Votes	%	±%
Liberal	Kevin Rozzoli	19,202	47.4	−14.0
Labor	Meagan Lawson	10,094	24.9	+2.7
One Nation	Noeline Saxiones	3,777	9.3	+9.3
Greens	Jocelyn Howden	2,146	5.3	+5.3
Democrats	Arthur Rutter	1,905	4.7	−3.1
Independent	Les Sheather	1,887	4.7	+4.7
Independent	David Belling	895	2.2	+2.2
AAFI	Geoffrey Dakin	496	1.2	+1.2
Non-Custodial Parents	Ian Bruggemann	105	0.3	+0.3
Total formal votes		40,507	97.7	+2.4
Informal votes		938	2.3	−2.4
Turnout		41,445	93.7	
Two-party-preferred result
Liberal	Kevin Rozzoli	21,510	63.3	−8.5
Labor	Meagan Lawson	12,466	36.7	+8.5
Liberal hold		Swing	−8.5	

==== 1995 ====
1995 New South Wales state election: Hawkesbury
Party	Candidate	Votes	%	±%
Liberal	Kevin Rozzoli	21,086	57.6	−5.7
Labor	Barry Calvert	9,122	24.9	+4.1
Democrats	Adam Baczynskyj	3,042	8.3	+1.1
Call to Australia	Heather Kraus	2,271	6.2	+6.2
Confederate Action	Robin Philbey	1,095	3.0	+3.0
Total formal votes		36,616	95.1	+2.5
Informal votes		1,871	4.9	−2.5
Turnout		38,487	94.8	
Two-party-preferred result
Liberal	Kevin Rozzoli	23,765	68.5	−4.3
Labor	Barry Calvert	10,914	31.5	+4.3
Liberal hold		Swing	−4.3	

==== 1991 ====
1991 New South Wales state election: Hawkesbury
Party	Candidate	Votes	%	±%
Liberal	Kevin Rozzoli	19,347	63.2	−7.0
Labor	Bob Benson	6,362	20.8	−7.9
Democrats	Michael Antrum	2,190	7.2	+7.2
Independent	Carl Bazeley	1,984	6.5	+6.5
Independent	Richard Mezinec	381	1.2	+1.2
Citizens Electoral Council	Warwick Gummerson	325	1.1	+1.1
Total formal votes		30,589	92.7	−4.1
Informal votes		2,425	7.3	+4.1
Turnout		33,014	93.0	
Two-party-preferred result
Liberal	Kevin Rozzoli	21,129	72.8	+1.8
Labor	Bob Benson	7,881	27.2	−1.8
Liberal hold		Swing	+1.8	

=== Elections in the 1980s ===
==== 1988 ====
1988 New South Wales state election: Hawkesbury
Party	Candidate	Votes	%	±%
Liberal	Kevin Rozzoli	21,419	72.1	+0.7
Labor	Lenore Craven	8,292	27.9	−0.7
Total formal votes		29,711	96.7	−0.9
Informal votes		1,018	3.3	+0.9
Turnout		30,729	93.4	
Liberal hold		Swing	+0.7	

==== 1984 ====
1984 New South Wales state election: Hawkesbury
Party	Candidate	Votes	%	±%
Liberal	Kevin Rozzoli	23,128	68.0	+9.5
Labor	Harmanus Toorneman	10,862	32.0	−2.0
Total formal votes		33,990	97.6	+0.6
Informal votes		832	2.4	−0.6
Turnout		34,822	90.8	+1.1
Liberal hold		Swing	+5.2	

==== 1981 ====
1981 New South Wales state election: Hawkesbury
Party	Candidate	Votes	%	±%
Liberal	Kevin Rozzoli	17,755	58.5	
Labor	Bennett Fienberg	10,317	34.0	
Independent	John Whittington	2,256	7.4	
Total formal votes		30,328	97.0	
Informal votes		930	3.0	
Turnout		31,258	89.7	
Two-party-preferred result
Liberal	Kevin Rozzoli	18,254	62.8	+4.2
Labor	Bennett Fienburg	10,833	37.2	−4.2
Liberal hold		Swing	+4.2	

=== Elections in the 1970s ===
==== 1978 ====
1978 New South Wales state election: Hawkesbury
Party	Candidate	Votes	%	±%
Liberal	Kevin Rozzoli	19,823	55.2	−5.6
Labor	Alwyn Lindfield	16,061	44.8	+5.6
Total formal votes		35,884	97.1	−1.0
Informal votes		1,083	2.9	+1.0
Turnout		36,967	92.1	+0.7
Liberal hold		Swing	−5.6	

==== 1976 ====
1976 New South Wales state election: Hawkesbury
Party	Candidate	Votes	%	±%
Liberal	Kevin Rozzoli	19,367	60.8	−0.1
Labor	Alwyn Lindfield	12,486	39.2	+8.9
Total formal votes		31,853	98.1	+1.4
Informal votes		609	1.9	−1.4
Turnout		32,462	91.4	−0.4
Liberal hold		Swing	−5.7	

==== 1973 ====
1973 New South Wales state election: Hawkesbury
Party	Candidate	Votes	%	±%
Liberal	Kevin Rozzoli	16,183	60.9	+10.0
Labor	Peter Stone	8,050	30.3	−12.3
Independent	John McMahon	840	3.2	+3.2
Australia	Peter Knowland	762	2.9	+2.9
Democratic Labor	Emma Ekman	727	2.7	+2.7
Total formal votes		26,562	96.7	
Informal votes		912	3.3	
Turnout		27,474	91.8	
Two-party-preferred result
Liberal	Kevin Rozzoli	17,664	66.5	+10.0
Labor	Peter Stone	8,898	33.5	−10.0
Liberal hold		Swing	+10.0	

==== 1973 by-election ====
1973 Hawkesbury by-election Saturday 17 February
Party	Candidate	Votes	%	±%
Liberal	Kevin Rozzoli	11,621	45.5	−4.4
Labor	Peter Dunn	10,495	41.1	−2.5
Democratic Labor	John Allen	1,003	3.9	
Australia	Vivienne Berzin	703	2.8	
Independent	Charles Bannister	677	2.6	
Independent	Donald MacDonald	672	2.6	
Independent	Mervyn Crane	379	1.5	
Total formal votes		25,550	96.41	−1.1
Informal votes		951	3.59	+1.1
Turnout		26,501	83.18	−8.2
Two-party-preferred result
Liberal	Kevin Rozzoli	13,428	52.6	−2.4
Labor	Peter Dunn	12,122	47.4	+2.4
Liberal hold		Swing	−2.44	

Bernie Deane (Liberal) resigned.

==== 1971 ====
1971 New South Wales state election: Hawkesbury
Party	Candidate	Votes	%	±%
Liberal	Bernie Deane	12,359	49.9	
Labor	Walter Brown	10,801	43.6	
Independent	Charles Rogers	1,628	6.6	
Total formal votes		24,788	97.5	
Informal votes		632	2.5	
Turnout		25,420	91.4	
Two-party-preferred result
Liberal	Bernie Deane	13,634	55.0	−7.0
Labor	Walter Brown	11,154	45.0	+7.0
Liberal hold		Swing	−7.0	

=== Elections in the 1960s ===
==== 1968 ====
1968 New South Wales state election: Hawkesbury
Party	Candidate	Votes	%	±%
Liberal	Bernie Deane	10,313	48.4	
Labor	Dick Klugman	8,955	42.0	
Democratic Labor	Leslie Clarke	1,432	6.7	
Republican	William Murray	428	2.0	
Independent	Rodney Rose	177	0.8	
Total formal votes		21,305	97.4	
Informal votes		558	2.6	
Turnout		21,863	91.4	
Two-party-preferred result
Liberal	Bernie Deane	11,713	55.0	−5.8
Labor	Dick Klugman	9,592	45.0	+5.8
Liberal hold		Swing	−5.8	

==== 1965 ====
1965 New South Wales state election: Hawkesbury
Party	Candidate	Votes	%	±%
Liberal	Bernie Deane	15,809	64.8	+3.8
Labor	Lawrence Kaufmann	8,048	33.0	−0.7
Independent	Malcolm Tarlton−Rayment	532	2.2	+2.2
Total formal votes		24,389	98.3	−0.2
Informal votes		427	1.7	+0.2
Turnout		24,816	92.2	−1.4
Two-party-preferred result
Liberal	Bernie Deane	16,075	65.9	+1.5
Labor	Lawrence Kaufmann	8,314	34.1	−1.5
Liberal hold		Swing	+1.5	

==== 1962 ====
1962 New South Wales state election: Hawkesbury
Party	Candidate	Votes	%	±%
Liberal	Bernie Deane	12,915	61.0	−4.5
Labor	Lawrence Kaufmann	7,138	33.7	−0.8
Independent	Donald McKay	1,125	5.3	+5.3
Total formal votes		21,178	98.5	
Informal votes		312	1.5	
Turnout		21,490	93.6	
Two-party-preferred result
Liberal	Bernie Deane	13,646	64.4	−1.1
Labor	Lawrence Kaufmann	7,532	35.6	+1.1
Liberal hold		Swing	−1.1	

=== Elections in the 1950s ===
==== 1959 ====
1959 New South Wales state election: Hawkesbury
Party	Candidate	Votes	%	±%
Liberal	Bernie Deane	11,371	57.7	
Labor	Kevin Dwyer	8,338	42.3	
Total formal votes		19,709	98.8	
Informal votes		240	1.2	
Turnout		19,949	93.2	
Liberal hold		Swing		

==== 1956 ====
1956 New South Wales state election: Hawkesbury
Party	Candidate	Votes	%	±%
Liberal	Bernie Deane	11,013	64.3	+7.1
Labor	John Grinham	6,113	35.7	−7.1
Total formal votes		17,126	98.3	+0.1
Informal votes		298	1.7	−0.1
Turnout		17,424	91.4	−1.2
Liberal hold		Swing	+7.1	

==== 1953 ====
1953 New South Wales state election: Hawkesbury
Party	Candidate	Votes	%	±%
Liberal	Bernie Deane	9,149	57.2	
Labor	John Egan	6,848	42.8	
Total formal votes		15,997	98.2	
Informal votes		293	1.8	
Turnout		16,290	92.6	
Liberal hold		Swing		

==== 1950 ====
1950 New South Wales state election: Hawkesbury
Party	Candidate	Votes	%	±%
Liberal	Bernie Deane	7,274	47.5	
Independent	Herbert Daley	4,711	30.8	
Country	Greg McGirr	3,324	21.7	
Total formal votes		15,309	95.4	
Informal votes		742	4.6	
Turnout		16,051	90.7	
Two-candidate-preferred result
Liberal	Bernie Deane	9,286	60.7	
Independent	Herbert Daley	6,023	39.3	
Liberal notional hold				

The redistribution made Hawkesbury a notional Liberal seat. The sitting member Frank Finnan (Labor) successfully contested the new district of Darlinghurst.

=== Elections in the 1940s ===
==== 1947 ====
1947 New South Wales state election: Hawkesbury
Party	Candidate	Votes	%	±%
Labor	Frank Finnan	10,034	52.0	−6.7
Liberal	Bernie Deane	7,562	39.1	+16.1
Country	Edward Mann	1,717	8.9	−9.4
Total formal votes		19,313	98.6	+0.2
Informal votes		279	1.4	−0.2
Turnout		19,592	95.6	+4.7
Labor hold		Swing	N/A	

- Preferences were not distributed.

==== 1944 ====
1944 New South Wales state election: Hawkesbury
Party	Candidate	Votes	%	±%
Labor	Frank Finnan	9,195	58.7	+15.7
Democratic	George Ardill	3,599	23.0	−15.1
Country	Ernest Batchelor	2,874	18.3	+18.3
Total formal votes		15,668	98.4	−0.3
Informal votes		256	1.6	+0.3
Turnout		15,924	90.9	−2.0
Labor hold		Swing	N/A	

- Preferences were not distributed.

==== 1941 ====
1941 New South Wales state election: Hawkesbury
Party	Candidate	Votes	%	±%
Labor	Frank Finnan	6,453	43.0	
United Australia	Arthur Brown	5,718	38.1	
Ind. United Australia	Charles Staples	2,841	18.9	
Total formal votes		15,012	98.7	
Informal votes		195	1.3	
Turnout		15,207	92.9	
Two-party-preferred result
Labor	Frank Finnan	7,571	50.4	
United Australia	Arthur Brown	7,441	49.6	
Labor gain from United Australia		Swing		

=== Elections in the 1930s ===
==== 1938 ====
1938 New South Wales state election: Hawkesbury
Party	Candidate	Votes	%	±%
United Australia	Bruce Walker Jr	8,676	56.0	−13.7
Independent	Victor Gillespie	6,803	44.0	+44.0
Total formal votes		15,479	97.4	+0.4
Informal votes		406	2.6	−0.4
Turnout		15,885	95.9	+0.1
United Australia hold		Swing	−13.7	

==== 1935 ====
1935 New South Wales state election: Hawkesbury
Party	Candidate	Votes	%	±%
United Australia	Bruce Walker Jr	10,102	69.7	+17.9
Independent	Allan Cordner	4,385	30.3	+30.3
Total formal votes		14,487	97.0	−1.9
Informal votes		443	3.0	+1.9
Turnout		14,930	95.8	−0.9
United Australia hold		Swing	N/A	

==== 1932 ====
1932 New South Wales state election: Hawkesbury
Party	Candidate	Votes	%	±%
United Australia	Bruce Walker Jr	6,754	51.8	−13.2
Labor (NSW)	Henry Taverner	2,495	19.1	−15.9
Independent Country	Robert Wood	2,394	18.4	+18.4
Independent Country	Albert Taylor	1,398	10.7	+10.7
Total formal votes		13,041	98.9	+0.4
Informal votes		151	1.1	−0.4
Turnout		13,192	96.7	+0.2
United Australia hold		Swing	N/A	

- Preferences were not distributed.

==== 1930 ====
1930 New South Wales state election: Hawkesbury
Party	Candidate	Votes	%	±%
Nationalist	Bruce Walker Sr	7,846	65.0	
Labor	William Acason	4,216	35.0	
Total formal votes		12,062	98.5	
Informal votes		179	1.5	
Turnout		12,241	96.5	
Nationalist hold		Swing		

=== Elections in the 1920s ===
==== 1927 ====
This section is an excerpt from 1927 New South Wales state election § Hawkesbury

1927 New South Wales state election: Hawkesbury
Party	Candidate	Votes	%	±%
Nationalist	Bruce Walker Sr	7,553	66.9	
Labor	Florence Ewers	2,501	22.1	
Independent	William Grahame	1,242	11.0	
Total formal votes		11,296	98.7	
Informal votes		145	1.3	
Turnout		11,441	77.6	
Nationalist win		(new seat)		

==== 1920 - 1927 ====
District abolished

=== Elections in the 1910s ===
==== 1917 ====
This section is an excerpt from 1917 New South Wales state election § Hawkesbury

1917 New South Wales state election: Hawkesbury
Party	Candidate	Votes	%	±%
Nationalist	Brinsley Hall	3,395	46.0	−16.2
Independent	Bruce Walker	2,011	27.2	+27.2
Labor	Tom Arthur	1,981	26.8	+1.2
Total formal votes		7,387	98.9	+1.8
Informal votes		79	1.1	−1.8
Turnout		7,466	67.0	+3.9
Second round result
Independent	Bruce Walker	3,600	50.2	
Nationalist	Brinsley Hall	3,568	49.8	
Total formal votes		7,168	99.6	+0.7
Informal votes		26	0.4	−0.7
Turnout		7,194	64.5	+1.4
Independent gain from Nationalist				

==== 1913 ====
This section is an excerpt from 1913 New South Wales state election § Hawkesbury

1913 New South Wales state election: Hawkesbury
Party	Candidate	Votes	%	±%
Liberal Reform	Brinsley Hall	4,114	62.2	
Labor	Frederick Webster	1,693	25.6	
Independent Liberal	Henry Wilson	810	12.2	
Total formal votes		6,617	97.1	
Informal votes		196	2.9	
Turnout		6,813	63.1	
Liberal Reform hold				

==== 1910 ====
This section is an excerpt from 1910 New South Wales state election § The Hawkesbury

1910 New South Wales state election: The Hawkesbury
Party	Candidate	Votes	%	±%
Liberal Reform	Brinsley Hall	4,041	69.6	
Labour	Albert Jones	1,766	30.4	
Total formal votes		5,807	98.3	
Informal votes		98	1.7	
Turnout		5,905	66.4	
Liberal Reform hold				

=== Elections in the 1900s ===
==== 1907 ====
This section is an excerpt from 1907 New South Wales state election § The Hawkesbury

1907 New South Wales state election: The Hawkesbury
Party	Candidate	Votes	%	±%
Liberal Reform	Brinsley Hall	3,571	65.6	
Independent	Thomas Smith	1,673	30.7	
Labour	Arthur Mackenzie	200	3.7	
Total formal votes		5,444	97.0	
Informal votes		169	3.0	
Turnout		5,613	68.0	
Member changed to Liberal Reform from Progressive				

==== 1904 ====
This section is an excerpt from 1904 New South Wales state election § The Hawkesbury

1904 New South Wales state election: The Hawkesbury
Party	Candidate	Votes	%	±%
Progressive	Brinsley Hall	3,058	51.2	
Liberal Reform	Thomas Kelly	2,918	48.8	
Total formal votes		5,976	99.2	
Informal votes		46	0.8	
Turnout		6,022	71.8	
Progressive hold				

The Hawkesbury lost part of the district to Sherbrooke and was expanded to include parts of Northumberland, and the abolished seat of The Nepean. The member for The Hawkesbury was Brinsley Hall (Progressive). The member for Northumberland was John Norton (Independent) who successfully contested Surry Hills. The member for The Nepean was Thomas Smith who unsuccessfully contested Sherbrooke.

==== 1901 ====
This section is an excerpt from 1901 New South Wales state election § The Hawkesbury

1901 New South Wales state election: The Hawkesbury
Party	Candidate	Votes	%	±%
Progressive	Brinsley Hall	1,348	63.3	+17.8
Liberal Reform	William Morgan	781	36.7	−12.1
Total formal votes		2,129	99.2	+0.3
Informal votes		18	0.8	−0.3
Turnout		2,147	80.2	+7.3
Progressive gain from Liberal Reform				

=== Elections in the 1890s ===
==== 1898 ====
This section is an excerpt from 1898 New South Wales colonial election § The Hawkesbury

1898 New South Wales colonial election: The Hawkesbury
Party	Candidate	Votes	%	±%
Free Trade	William Morgan	978	48.8	
Independent Federalist	Brinsley Hall	913	45.6	
National Federal	John Paine	81	4.0	
Independent Federalist	William Dean	32	1.6	
Total formal votes		2,004	98.8	
Informal votes		24	1.2	
Turnout		2,028	72.9	
Free Trade hold				

==== 1895 ====
This section is an excerpt from 1895 New South Wales colonial election § The Hawkesbury

1895 New South Wales colonial election: The Hawkesbury
Party	Candidate	Votes	%	±%
Free Trade	William Morgan	1,065	61.0	
Independent	Arthur Bowman	680	39.0	
Total formal votes		1,745	99.5	
Informal votes		8	0.5	
Turnout		1,753	75.8	
Member changed to Free Trade from Ind. Free Trade				

==== 1894 ====
This section is an excerpt from 1894 New South Wales colonial election § The Hawkesbury

1894 New South Wales colonial election: The Hawkesbury
Party	Candidate	Votes	%	±%
Ind. Free Trade	William Morgan	1,029	48.4	
Free Trade	Sydney Burdekin	939	44.1	
Labour	Henry Buttsworth	110	5.2	
Protectionist	Thomas Bennett	50	2.4	
Total formal votes		2,128	98.9	
Informal votes		23	1.1	
Turnout		2,151	89.0	
Ind. Free Trade gain from Free Trade				

==== 1892 by-election ====
1892 The Hawkesbury by-election Saturday 30 July
Party	Candidate	Votes	%	±%
Free Trade	Sydney Burdekin (elected)	982	47.9	
Free Trade	William Morgan	879	42.9	
Free Trade	John Fitzpatrick	189	9.2	
Total formal votes		2,050	98.7	
Informal votes		26	1.3	
Turnout		2,076	79.4 (Note: Turnout is an estimate based on the roll of 2,616 at the election on 17 June 1891.)	
Free Trade hold				

Alexander Bowman (Free Trade) died.

==== 1891 ====
1891 New South Wales colonial election: The Hawkesbury Wednesday 17 June
Party	Candidate	Votes	%	±%
Free Trade	Alexander Bowman (elected)	883	51.2	
Free Trade	William Morgan	841	48.8	
Total formal votes		1,724	98.5	
Informal votes		26	1.5	
Turnout		1,750	66.9	
Free Trade hold				

=== Elections in the 1880s ===
==== 1889 ====
This section is an excerpt from 1889 New South Wales colonial election § The Hawkesbury

1889 New South Wales colonial election: The Hawkesbury Saturday 16 February
Party	Candidate	Votes	%	±%
Free Trade	Alexander Bowman (elected)	1,151	67.8	
Protectionist	Thomas Rose	548	32.3	
Total formal votes		1,699	98.5	
Informal votes		26	1.5	
Turnout		1,725	69.7	
Free Trade hold				

==== 1887 ====
This section is an excerpt from 1887 New South Wales colonial election § The Hawkesbury

1887 New South Wales colonial election: The Hawkesbury Saturday 12 February
Party	Candidate	Votes	%	±%
Free Trade	Alexander Bowman (re-elected)	758	46.3	
Ind. Free Trade	John Griffin	657	40.1	
Independent	Thomas Primrose	222	13.6	
Total formal votes		1,637	97.7	
Informal votes		38	2.3	
Turnout		1,675	73.4	

==== 1885 ====
This section is an excerpt from 1885 New South Wales colonial election § The Hawkesbury

1885 New South Wales colonial election: The Hawkesbury Monday 19 October
Candidate	Votes	%
Alexander Bowman (elected)	831	52.9
Henry McQuade (defeated)	741	47.1
Total formal votes	1,572	98.0
Informal votes	32	2.0
Turnout	1,604	76.3

==== 1882 ====
This section is an excerpt from 1882 New South Wales colonial election § The Hawkesbury

1882 New South Wales colonial election: The Hawkesbury Monday 11 December
Candidate	Votes	%
Henry McQuade (elected)	862	53.8
Alexander Bowman (defeated)	739	46.2
Total formal votes	1,601	97.1
Informal votes	48	2.9
Turnout	1,649	81.4

==== 1880 ====
This section is an excerpt from 1880 New South Wales colonial election § The Hawkesbury

1880 New South Wales colonial election: The Hawkesbury Friday 26 November
Candidate	Votes	%
Alexander Bowman (re-elected)	866	54.1
Henry McQuade (defeated)	736	45.9
Total formal votes	1,602	98.2
Informal votes	29	1.8
Turnout	1,631	82.8
	(1 less seat)	

The other sitting member Henry Moses did not contest the election. Henry McQuade was the sitting member for the abolished district of Windsor.

=== Elections in the 1870s ===
==== 1877 ====
1877 New South Wales colonial election: The Hawkesbury Tuesday 30 October
Candidate	Votes	%
Alexander Bowman (elected 1)	462	33.0
Henry Moses (re-elected 2)	383	27.3
William Piddington (defeated)	283	20.2
Thomas Primrose	177	12.6
George Davies	96	6.9
Total formal votes	1,401	100.0
Informal votes	0	0.0
Turnout	1,401	50.8

==== 1877 by-election ====
1877 The Hawkesbury by-election Saturday 7 April
Candidate	Votes	%
William Piddington (elected)	439	72.8
George Davies	164	27.2
Total formal votes	603	100.0
Informal votes	0	0.0
Turnout	603	43.7 (Note: Turnout is an estimate based on the roll of 1,380 at the election on 30 October 1877.)

William Piddington had been appointed Colonial Treasurer in the second Parkes ministry.

==== 1874-75 ====
This section is an excerpt from 1874-75 New South Wales colonial election § The Hawkesbury

1874–75 New South Wales colonial election: The Hawkesbury Monday 28 December 1874
Candidate	Votes	%
Henry Moses (re-elected 1)	475	40.5
William Piddington (re-elected 2)	467	39.9
George Davies	230	19.6
Total formal votes	1,172	100.0
Informal votes	0	0.0
Turnout	1,172	43.1

==== 1872 ====
This section is an excerpt from 1872 New South Wales colonial election § The Hawkesbury

1872 New South Wales colonial election: The Hawkesbury Thursday 7 March
Candidate	Votes	%
Henry Moses (re-elected 1)	591	43.0
William Piddington (re-elected 2)	522	38.0
Marshall Burdekin	262	19.1
Total formal votes	1,375	100.0
Informal votes	0	0.0
Turnout	1,375	46.4

=== Elections in the 1860s ===
==== 1869-70 ====
This section is an excerpt from 1869-70 New South Wales colonial election § The Hawkesbury

1869–70 New South Wales colonial election: The Hawkesbury Saturday 18 December 1869
Candidate	Votes	%
Henry Moses (elected 1)	525	36.1
William Piddington (re-elected 2)	445	30.6
James Cunneen (defeated)	406	27.9
James Ascough	73	5.0
W P Wilshire	6	0.4
Total formal votes	1,455	100.0
Informal votes	0	0.0
Turnout	1,021	66.6

==== 1864-65 ====
This section is an excerpt from 1864–65 New South Wales colonial election § The Hawkesbury

1864–65 New South Wales colonial election: The Hawkesbury Tuesday 29 November 1864
Candidate	Votes	%
William Piddington (re-elected)	unopposed	
James Cunneen (re-elected)	unopposed	

==== 1860 ====
This section is an excerpt from 1860 New South Wales colonial election § The Hawkesbury

1860 New South Wales colonial election: The Hawkesbury Friday 21 December
Candidate	Votes	%
William Piddington (re-elected 2)	unopposed	
James Cunneen (elected 1)	unopposed	

=== Elections in the 1850s ===
==== 1859 ====
This section is an excerpt from 1859 New South Wales colonial election § The Hawkesbury

1859 New South Wales colonial election: The Hawkesbury Saturday 25 June
Candidate	Votes	%
William Piddington (re-elected)	unopposed	
John Darvall (elected)	unopposed	
