= 1892 Hawkesbury colonial by-election =

By-election in New South Wales, Australia

A by-election was held for the New South Wales Legislative Assembly electorate of The Hawkesbury on 30 July 1892 caused by the death of Alexander Bowman (Free Trade).

== Dates ==
Date	Event
10 July 1892	Death of Alexander Bowman.
18 July 1892	Writ of election issued by the Speaker of the Legislative Assembly.
23 July 1892	Nominations
30 July 1892	Polling day
13 August 1892	Return of writ

== Results ==
1892 The Hawkesbury by-election Saturday 30 July
Party	Candidate	Votes	%	±%
Free Trade	Sydney Burdekin (elected)	982	47.9	
Free Trade	William Morgan	879	42.9	
Free Trade	John Fitzpatrick	189	9.2	
Total formal votes		2,050	98.7	
Informal votes		26	1.3	
Turnout		2,076	79.4 (Note: Turnout is an estimate based on the roll of 2,616 at the election on 17 June 1891.)	
Free Trade hold				

== See also ==
- Electoral results for the district of Hawkesbury
- List of New South Wales state by-elections
