= Electoral results for the district of Darlinghurst =

Election results for Darlinghurst, New South Wales, Australia

Darlinghurst, an electoral district of the Legislative Assembly in the Australian state of New South Wales had two incarnations, from 1904 until 1920 and from 1950 until 1953.

First incarnation (1904–1920)
Election	Member	Party
1904	Daniel Levy	Liberal Reform
1907	Daniel Levy	Liberal Reform
1910	Daniel Levy	Liberal Reform
1913	Daniel Levy	Liberal Reform
1917	Daniel Levy	Nationalist
Second incarnation (1950–1953)
Election	Member	Party
1950	Frank Finnan	Labor

== Election results ==
=== Elections in the 1950s ===
==== 1950 ====
1950 New South Wales state election: Darlinghurst
Party	Candidate	Votes	%	±%
Liberal	John Paget	10,553	47.8	
Labor	Frank Finnan	10,505	47.6	
Communist	Adam Ogston	1,012	4.6	
Total formal votes		22,070	97.3	
Informal votes		603	2.7	
Turnout		22,673	89.0	
Two-party-preferred result
Labor	Frank Finnan	11,401	51.7	
Liberal	John Paget	10,669	48.3	
Labor notional hold				

Frank Finnan (Labor) was the member for Hawkesbury.

District recreated

==== 1920 - 1950 ====
District abolished

=== Elections in the 1910s ===
==== 1917 ====
1917 New South Wales state election: Darlinghurst
Party	Candidate	Votes	%	±%
Nationalist	Daniel Levy	4,143	55.0	+2.2
Labor	John Farrell	3,316	44.1	−3.1
Independent	Percy Brunton	68	0.9	+0.9
Total formal votes		7,527	98.4	+1.7
Informal votes		124	1.6	−1.7
Turnout		7,651	55.3	−6.0
Nationalist hold		Swing	+2.2	

==== 1913 ====
1913 New South Wales state election: Darlinghurst
Party	Candidate	Votes	%	±%
Liberal Reform	Daniel Levy	4,055	52.8	
Labor	Frank Foster	3,622	47.2	
Total formal votes		7,677	96.7	
Informal votes		264	3.3	
Turnout		7,941	61.3	
Liberal Reform hold				

==== 1910 ====
1910 New South Wales state election: Darlinghurst
Party	Candidate	Votes	%	±%
Liberal Reform	Daniel Levy	3,556	52.9	
Labour	Jack FitzGerald	3,043	45.2	
Independent	John Haynes	128	1.9	
Total formal votes		6,727	97.9	
Informal votes		144	2.1	
Turnout		6,871	65.0	
Liberal Reform hold				

=== Elections in the 1900s ===
==== 1907 ====
1907 New South Wales state election: Darlinghurst
Party	Candidate	Votes	%	±%
Liberal Reform	Daniel Levy	2,640	57.7	
Labour	Donald McKinnon	1,263	27.6	
Independent	David Middleton	661	14.4	
Total formal votes		4,579	97.5	
Informal votes		116	2.5	
Turnout		4,695	56.9	
Liberal Reform hold				

==== 1904 ====
1904 New South Wales state election: Darlinghurst
Party	Candidate	Votes	%	±%
Liberal Reform	Daniel Levy	2,743	56.3	
Labour	John Birt	2,129	43.7	
Total formal votes		4,872	99.5	
Informal votes		27	0.6	
Turnout		4,899	50.0	
Liberal Reform win		(new seat)		

Darlinghurst was a new seat consisting of parts of Paddington and the abolished seats of Sydney-Fitzroy and Sydney-Bligh. The member for Sydney-Fitzroy was Daniel Levy (Liberal Reform). The member for Sydney-Bligh was Patrick Quinn (Progressive) who unsuccessfully contested King. The member for Paddington was Charles Oakes (Liberal Reform) who successfully contested that seat.
