= 1872 Newcastle colonial by-election =

Election result for Newcastle, New South Wales, Australia

A by-election was held for the New South Wales Legislative Assembly electorate of Newcastle on 27 May 1872. The by-election was triggered because George Lloyd had been appointed Postmaster-General in the first Parkes ministry.

Henry Parkes comfortably retained his seat at the East Sydney by-election held the week before, while the five other ministers were re-elected unopposed. (Note: The five other ministers were Edward Butler (Argyle), James Farnell (Parramatta), Joseph Innes (Mudgee), William Piddington (The Hawkesbury) and John Sutherland (Paddington) Green, Antony. "Index of By-elections". New South Wales Election Results 1856-2007. Parliament of New South Wales.)

== Dates ==
Date	Event
14 May 1872	George Lloyd appointed Postmaster-General.
15 May 1872	Writ of election issued by the Speaker of the Legislative Assembly.
27 May 1872	Day of nomination
29 May 1872	Polling day
11 June 1872	Return of writ

== Results ==
1872 Newcastle by-election Wednesday 29 May
Candidate	Votes	%
George Lloyd (re-elected)	692	57.1
Daniel Macquarie	519	42.9
Total formal votes	1,211	98.6
Informal votes	17	1.4
Turnout	1,228	78.8

== See also ==
- Electoral results for the district of Newcastle
- List of New South Wales state by-elections
