= 1973 Hawkesbury state by-election =

Election result for Hawkesbury, New South Wales, Australia

A by-election was held for the New South Wales Legislative Assembly seat of Hawkesbury on Saturday, 17 February 1973. It was triggered by the resignation of Bernie Deane (Liberal).

== Dates ==
Date	Event
24 October 1972	Resignation of Bernie Deane.
19 January 1973	Writ of election issued by the Speaker of the Legislative Assembly and close of electoral rolls.
26 January 1973	Nominations
17 February 1973	Polling day
16 March 1973	Return of writ

== Results ==
1973 Hawkesbury by-election Saturday 17 February
Party	Candidate	Votes	%	±%
Liberal	Kevin Rozzoli	11,621	45.5	−4.4
Labor	Peter Dunn	10,495	41.1	−2.5
Democratic Labor	John Allen	1,003	3.9	
Australia	Vivienne Berzin	703	2.8	
Independent	Charles Bannister	677	2.6	
Independent	Donald MacDonald	672	2.6	
Independent	Mervyn Crane	379	1.5	
Total formal votes		25,550	96.41	−1.1
Informal votes		951	3.59	+1.1
Turnout		26,501	83.18	−8.2
Two-party-preferred result
Liberal	Kevin Rozzoli	13,428	52.6	−2.4
Labor	Peter Dunn	12,122	47.4	+2.4
Liberal hold		Swing	−2.44	

== See also ==
- Electoral results for the district of Hawkesbury
- List of New South Wales state by-elections
