= Parkes ministry =

Parkes ministry may refer to the following governments of the Colony of New South Wales led by Henry Parkes:

- Parkes ministry (1872–1875), the 14th ministry
- Parkes ministry (1877), the 16th ministry
- Parkes ministry (1878–1883), the 19th ministry
- Parkes ministry (1887–1889), the 24th ministry
- Parkes ministry (1889–1891), the 26th ministry
