= 1877 Hawkesbury colonial by-election =

By-election in New South Wales, Australia

A by-election was held for the New South Wales Legislative Assembly electorate of The Hawkesbury on 7 April 1877 because William Piddington had been appointed Colonial Treasurer in the second Parkes ministry. Such ministerial by-elections were usually uncontested and on this occasion, The Hawkesbury was the only district at which the re-election of a minister was opposed.

== Dates ==
Date	Event
23 March 1877	Writ of election issued by the Speaker of the Legislative Assembly.
4 April 1877	Nominations
7 April 1877	Polling day
19 April 1877	Return of writ

== Results ==
1877 The Hawkesbury by-election Saturday 7 April
Candidate	Votes	%
William Piddington (elected)	439	72.8
George Davies	164	27.2
Total formal votes	603	100.0
Informal votes	0	0.0
Turnout	603	43.7 (Note: Turnout is an estimate based on the roll of 1,380 at the election on 30 October 1877.)

== See also ==
- Electoral results for the district of Hawkesbury
- List of New South Wales state by-elections
