= Kevin Rozzoli =

Australian politician

The Honourable Kevin Rozzoli AM

26th Speaker of the New South Wales Legislative Assembly
- In office 27 April 1988 – 1 May 1995
- Premier: Nick Greiner; John Fahey
- Preceded by: Laurie Kelly
- Succeeded by: John Murray

Member of the New South Wales Legislative Assembly for Hawkesbury
- In office 17 February 1973 – 28 February 2003
- Preceded by: Bernie Deane
- Succeeded by: Steven Pringle

Personal details
- Born: Kevin Richard Rozzoli; 13 September 1939 (age 87) Sydney, New South Wales, Australia
- Party: Liberal Party
- Spouse(s): Lei Garfield, Carol Anne Rozzoli
- Children: 3

Kevin Richard Rozzoli AM (born 13 September 1939) is a former New South Wales politician, lawyer and watchmaker and jeweller. He was a Liberal Party of Australia member of the New South Wales Legislative Assembly from 1973 until 2003, representing the electorate of Hawkesbury and serving as Deputy Leader of the Liberal Party and Deputy Opposition Leader from 1981 to 1983 and as Speaker of the Legislative Assembly from 1988 to 1995, during the Greiner and John Fahey governments.

== Early years and career ==
Born in Sydney on 13 September 1939, Rozzoli was the second son of Frank Rozzoli, a watchmaker and jeweller, and Kathleen Butt. The family moved to the Hawkesbury region in 1940, and his father purchased a jewellers at 161 Windsor Road, Richmond in 1946. After gaining his initial education at Richmond High School, Rozzoli gained his Watchmaking trade certificate in 1960 and worked in the family business, "Rozzoli’s Jewellers", from 1956 until 1972. After his father's death in 1975, his brother Ron Rozzoli (b. 1936) took over the business, which he operated until his retirement in 1995. Ron Rozzoli was the Honorary Secretary of the Richmond School of Arts from 1960 to 2003.

Rozzoli is a great-grandson of Octave Fariola, a Belgian-born former Union Army officer who fought in the American Civil War and the Fenian Rising in Ireland, who later became farmer and civil engineer and who spent his final decades in Australia under variants of the name "Fariola de Rozzoli" after fleeing a scandal-plagued first marriage in Queensland. Speaking to the Hawkesbury Gazette in 2003, Rozzoli said he believed himself descended from "an old aristocratic Italian family" through Fariola, and was reported to be writing a book about his ancestor.

=== Early career ===
In December 1968, Rozzoli was elected as an Alderman on the Windsor Municipal Council (a forerunner to the City of Hawkesbury). Serving until 1974, Rozzoli's time as a local politician was marked by an interest in the protection of heritage buildings in the local area and the effects of sand and gravel mining in the Hawkesbury River. Rozzoli served as the founding President of the Hawkesbury District Conservation Society. Rozzoli soon became involved in the local branches of the Liberal Party of Australia, serving as Secretary of the Richmond Branch from 1972 to 1973 and as Secretary of the Hawkesbury State Electoral Council from 1972 to 1973.

== Political career ==
When the sitting Liberal member for the local seat of Hawkesbury, Bernie Deane, resigned due to ill health on 24 October 1972, a by-election for his seat was declared for the 17 February 1973. At age 33, Rozzoli narrowly won Liberal pre-selection for the seat after five ballots, defeating among others, Alan Cadman. The seat had gradually become more marginal over the years and Rozzoli went on to narrowly defeat the Labor candidate Peter Dunn by a two-party-preferred margin of 52 to 47 percent. However, he picked up a large swing in the state election a year later, and would be re-elected a further eight times in this seat. He was only seriously threatened once, in the 1978 "Wranslide," but even then won 55 percent on the first count, enough to retain the seat outright.

Serving as a shadow minister while the Liberal Party was in opposition during the 1980s, Rozzoli was elected deputy leader of the party and Deputy Opposition Leader in 1981, serving under leader John Dowd. However, with the departure of Dowd from the leadership on 15 March 1983 Rozzoli was defeated in his position of Deputy Leader by Rosemary Foot 7 votes to 6. While serving as an MP, Rozzoli undertook law studies through the Barristers Admission Board, being awarded a Diploma of Law in 1985 and was called to the bar in New South Wales in July 1985. When the Liberal Party under leader Nick Greiner won office in March 1988, Rozzoli was elected as the Speaker of the Legislative Assembly. After being re-elected in this office in 1991, during the tense period of the hung parliament where the Greiner government was held in place by three independents, Rozzoli was congratulated by the then Leader of the Opposition, Bob Carr: "This is the second occasion upon which your election has proceeded unopposed by the Opposition. Such a rare union ticket in this place could begin to earn you, the suspicion of your colleagues." The independent member for South Coast, John Hatton, was also glowing in his admiration: "I have been in this House for 18 years and I have seen Speakers come and go. Mr Rozzoli is the fairest and most impartial Speaker I have seen in this House."

Rozzoli sought to model his time in the Speaker's chair on the role of the Speaker of the House of Commons and has been the last speaker in the NSW Parliament so far to wear the full traditional dress of the Speaker, which includes the wig and full legal dress. Rozzoli's strict impartiality and affability as Speaker earned him great credit from all sides during the turbulent period of the hung parliament from 1991 to 1995 and was the only speaker of the Legislative Assembly in the 20th century to not have had a dissent or censure motion moved against him.

In 1999, the University of Western Sydney awarded him with a Doctorate of Letters (D.Litt.) recognising his services to the university. On 1 January 2001, Rozzoli, as a serving Member of Parliament, was awarded the Centenary Medal. His brother Ron was also awarded the medal for his service to the Richmond School of Arts. Rozzoli attempted to recontest his seat for a tenth time at the 2003 election, but amidst a period of intra-party factional conflict, was defeated for Liberal preselection by former Hornsby mayor Steven Pringle. The animosity created by defeating Rozzoli after thirty years was later touted as a factor in Pringle's own loss of preselection to Ray Williams after only one term; at the time, Rozzoli stated "what comes around, goes around".

== Later life ==
After leaving politics, Rozzoli served as national president of the Australasian Study of Parliament Group and as the Chair of the National Drug & Alcohol Research Centre at the University of New South Wales. Rozzoli also serves as a Director of the NSW Law & Justice Foundation, a Director of the Public Interest Advocacy Centre and as an Honorary Research Associate in the Department of Government at the University of Sydney. In 2005, the City of Hawkesbury decided to honour Rozzoli and his brother Ron by naming a new function room within the 'Deerubbin Centre' incorporating the Hawkesbury City Library, Museum and Art Gallery as the "Rozzoli Room". In the 2008 Australia Day Honours Rozzoli was made a Member of the Order of Australia (AM): "For service to the New South Wales Parliament, and to the community of the Greater Western Sydney area through a range of environmental protection, health and welfare, and educational organisations."

In July 2015, following the significant public criticism of the conduct of the Speaker of the Australian House of Representatives Bronwyn Bishop, including her decision to include the cost of helicopter flights to attend a part fundraiser within her parliamentary entitlements, Rozzoli was interviewed for his views as a former speaker. In addition to criticising the decision over the flights, Rozzoli noted that Bishop had failed to grasp "the true essence" of her role as Speaker: "She is seen as a politically-biased speaker, which is what I don’t like about it. Before I went into the Speaker’s job, I made a very careful study of the role. I read everything I could possibly find. I tried to immerse myself in the subject so that what I absorbed was its ethos. I don’t think Bronwyn’s done that and I don’t think she understands the first thing about it."

New South Wales Legislative Assembly
Preceded by Bernie Deane	Member for Hawkesbury; 1973–2003	Succeeded by Steven Pringle
Preceded by Laurie Kelly	Speaker of the New South Wales Legislative Assembly; 1988–1995	Succeeded by John Murray
Political offices
Preceded by Jim Cameron	Deputy Leader of the Opposition in New South Wales; 1981–1983	Succeeded by Rosemary Foot
Party political offices
Preceded by Jim Cameron	Deputy Leader of the New South Wales Liberal Party; 1981–1983	Succeeded by Rosemary Foot
