= May 1872 East Sydney colonial by-election =

By-election in New South Wales, Australia

A by-election was held for the New South Wales Legislative Assembly electorate of East Sydney on 22 May 1872 because Henry Parkes had been appointed Premier and Colonial Secretary, forming the first Parkes ministry. Such ministerial by-elections were usually uncontested however on this occasion a poll was required in East Sydney and Newcastle (George Lloyd), while the five other ministers, Edward Butler (Argyle), James Farnell (Parramatta), Joseph Innes (Mudgee), William Piddington (The Hawkesbury) and John Sutherland (Paddington), were re-elected unopposed.

James Jones had been an unsuccessful candidate for Central Cumberland at the 1868 by-election, and the 1869 election.

== Dates ==
Date	Event
14 May 1872	First Parkes ministry appointed.
15 May 1872	Writ of election issued by the Speaker of the Legislative Assembly.
20 May 1872	Nominations
22 May 1872	Polling day
11 June 1872	Return of writ

== Result ==
1872 East Sydney by-election Wednesday 22 May
Candidate	Votes	%
Henry Parkes (re-elected)	2,686	68.8
James Jones	1,216	31.2
Total formal votes	3,902	100.0
Informal votes	0	0.0
Turnout	3,902	35.0

== See also ==
- Electoral results for the district of East Sydney
- List of New South Wales state by-elections
