= 1872 East Sydney colonial by-election =

1872 East Sydney colonial by-election may refer to

- 1872 East Sydney colonial by-election 1 held in May 1872
- 1872 East Sydney colonial by-election 2 held in June 1872

== See also ==
- List of New South Wales state by-elections
