= Parkes ministry (1872–1875) =

First Parkes ministry
- 14th Cabinet of the Colony of New South Wales

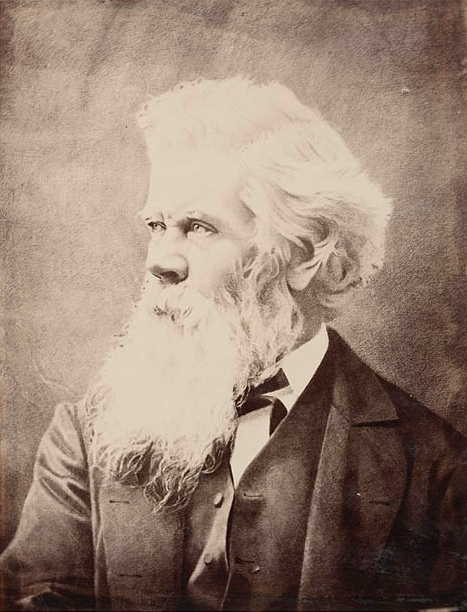
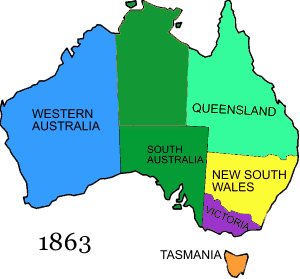
- Premier Henry Parkes and the Colony of New South Wales (1863–1900)
- Date formed: 14 May 1872
- Date dissolved: 8 February 1875

People and organisations
- Monarch: Queen Victoria
- Governor: Hercules Robinson
- Head of government: Henry Parkes
- No. of ministers: 10
- Member party: unaligned
- Status in legislature: Minority government
- Opposition party: unaligned
- Opposition leader: John Robertson

History
- Predecessor: Third Martin ministry
- Successor: Third Robertson ministry

The first Parkes ministry was the fourteenth ministry of the Colony of New South Wales, and the first of five occasions of being led by Henry Parkes.

Having served in the New South Wales Legislative Council between 1854 and 1856, Parkes was elected in the first free elections for the New South Wales Legislative Assembly held in 1856, however resigned from Parliament later that year. He served in the Assembly on several occasions, between 1858 and 1870, being forced to resign on 4 occasions due to his personal insolvency. He came to power as Premier on the first occasion after the Sir James Martin ministry had involved itself in a petty squabble with the colony of Victoria over a question of border duties. The acting-governor had sent for William Forster before parliament met, but he was unable to form a ministry, and in May 1872 Parkes formed his first ministry.

The title of Premier was widely used to refer to the Leader of Government, but not enshrined in formal use until 1920.

There was no party system in New South Wales politics until 1887. Under the constitution, ministers were required to resign to recontest their seats in a by-election when appointed. A poll was required for East Sydney (Henry Parkes) and Newcastle (George Lloyd), both of whom were comfortably re-elected. The five other ministers, Edward Butler (Argyle), James Farnell (Parramatta), Joseph Innes (Mudgee), William Piddington (The Hawkesbury) and John Sutherland (Paddington), were re-elected unopposed. Polls were subsequently required on the appointment of George Allen (Glebe) and Robert Abbott (Tenterfield) but each were comfortably re-elected.

The ministry created two new ministerial roles, Minister of Justice and Public Instruction in 1873 and the Secretary for Mines in 1874. The office of Solicitor General became dormant in 1873 when the Attorney General, Edward Butler. resigned and Solicitor General Joseph Innes was appointed Attorney General.

This ministry covers the period from 14 May 1872 until 8 February 1875, when Parkes lost the confidence of the Assembly following Governor Robinson's decision to release the bushranger Frank Gardiner, resulting in the defeat of the ministry.

== Composition of ministry ==
Portfolio	Minister	Term start	Term end	Term length
Premier; Colonial Secretary	Henry Parkes	14 May 1872	8 February 1875	2 years, 270 days
Colonial Treasurer	William Piddington	14 May 1872	4 December 1872	204 days
Colonial Treasurer	George Lloyd	5 December 1872	8 February 1875	2 years, 65 days
Secretary for Lands	James Farnell (Note: Without salary as Secretary for Mines.)	14 May 1872	8 February 1875	2 years, 270 days
Secretary for Mines	James Farnell	9 May 1874	26 July 1874	78 days
Secretary for Mines	Robert Abbott	27 July 1874	8 February 1875	196 days
Secretary for Public Works	John Sutherland	15 May 1872	8 February 1875	2 years, 269 days
Attorney General	Edward Butler	15 May 1872	10 November 1873	1 year, 179 days
Attorney General	Sir Joseph Innes MLA / MLC (Note: Joseph Innes resigned from his seat of Mudgee to accept appointment to the Legislative Council on 9 September 1873. He did not have a seat in Cabinet from 9 December 1873.)	20 November 1873	8 February 1875	1 year, 80 days
Solicitor General	Sir Joseph Innes MLA / MLC	14 May 1872	19 November 1873	1 year, 189 days
Minister of Justice and Public Instruction	George Allen	9 December 1873	8 February 1875	1 year, 61 days
Postmaster-General	George Lloyd	14 May 1872	4 December 1872	204 days
Postmaster-General	Saul Samuel MLC	3 December 1872	8 February 1875	2 years, 67 days
Vice-President of the Executive Council	Saul Samuel MLC	14 May 1872	8 February 1875	2 years, 270 days
Representative of the Government in the Legislative Council	Saul Samuel MLC	14 May 1872	13 September 1873	1 year, 122 days
Representative of the Government in the Legislative Council	Sir Joseph Innes MLC	13 September 1873	8 February 1875	1 year, 148 days

Ministers are members of the Legislative Assembly unless otherwise noted.

== See also ==
- Self-government in New South Wales
  - Members of Parliament
  - 1872–1874 (Assembly)
  - (Council)
  - 1874–1877 (Assembly)
  - (Council)
  - Parkes ministries
  - Second (1877)
  - Third (1878–1883)
  - Fourth (1887–1889)
  - Fifth (1889–1891)

Government offices
Preceded by Third Martin ministry	First Parkes ministry 1872–1875	Succeeded by Third Robertson ministry
