= Robertson ministry (1875–1877) =

Third Robertson ministry
- 15th Cabinet of the Colony of New South Wales

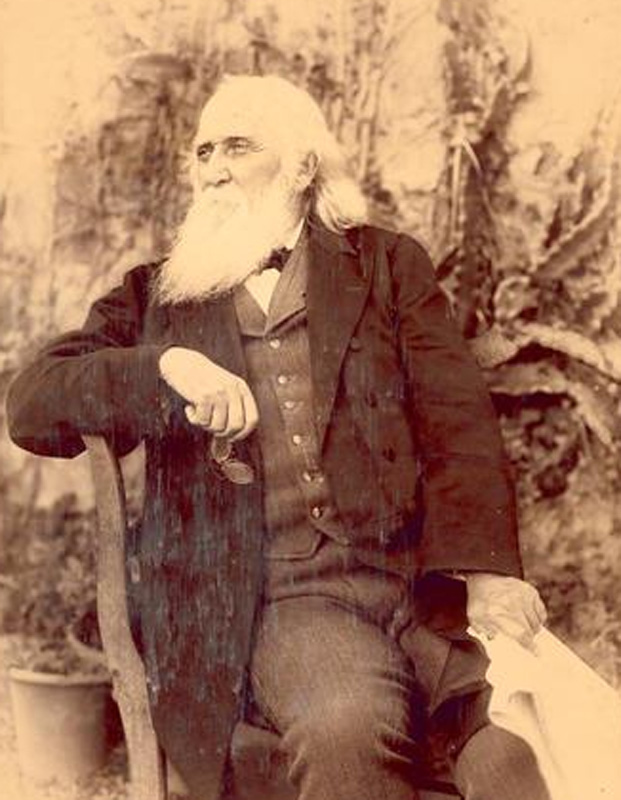
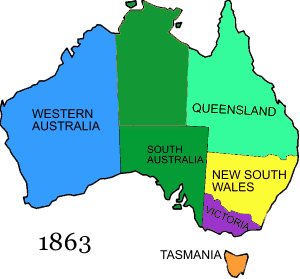
- Premier John Robertson and the Colony of New South Wales (1863–1900)
- Date formed: 9 February 1875
- Date dissolved: 21 March 1877

People and organisations
- Monarch: Queen Victoria
- Governor: Sir Hercules Robinson
- Head of government: John Robertson
- No. of ministers: 8
- Member party: unaligned
- Status in legislature: Minority government
- Opposition party: unaligned
- Opposition leader: Henry Parkes

History
- Predecessor: First Parkes ministry
- Successor: Second Parkes ministry

The third Robertson ministry was the fifteenth ministry of the Colony of New South Wales, and was led by John Robertson. It was the third of five occasions that Robertson was Premier. Robertson was elected in the first free elections for the New South Wales Legislative Assembly held in March 1856.

The title of Premier was widely used to refer to the Leader of Government, but not a formal position in the ministry until 1920.

There was no party system in New South Wales politics until 1887. Under the constitution, ministers were required to resign to recontest their seats in a by-election when appointed. Such ministerial by-elections were usually uncontested and on this occasion the ministers were all re-elected unopposed.

In 1876 William Forster was appointed Agent-General for New South Wales in London and was replaced as Colonial Treasurer by Alexander Stuart. In January 1877 Thomas Garrett was accused of bribery in relation to positions within the Department of Lands, and insobriety affecting his capacity to fulfill his responsibilities as minister. Garrett resigned as minister and the government narrowly survived a censure motion by 29 votes to 26. Ezekiel Baker replaced Garrett as Secretary for Lands.

This ministry covers the period from 9 February 1875 until 21 March 1877, when Robertson was unable to obtain supply and resigned when Henry Parkes indicated that he was able to form a government.

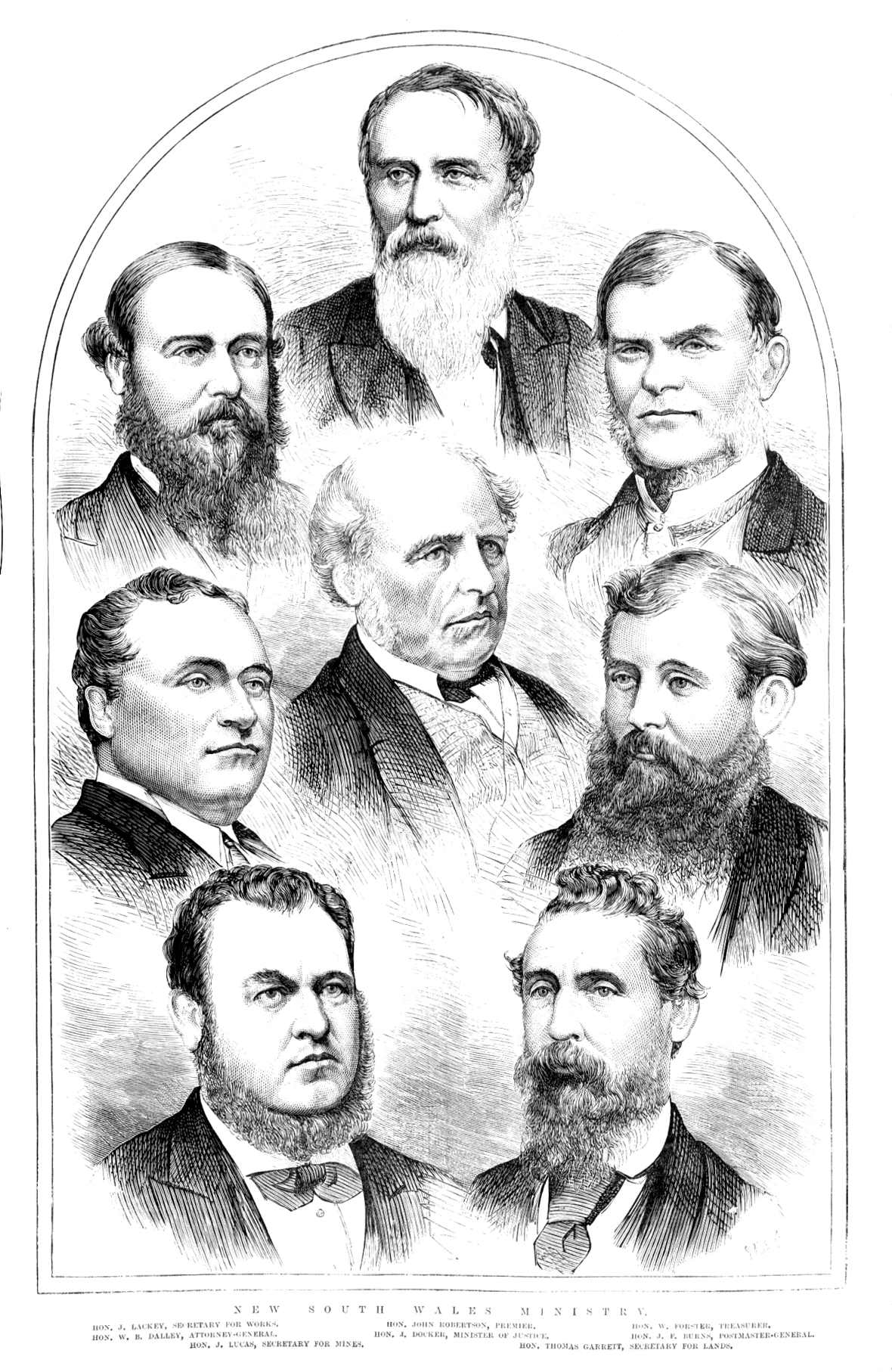
Third Robertson ministry 1875

== Composition of ministry ==
Portfolio	Minister	Term start	Term end	Term length
Premier; Colonial Secretary	John Robertson	9 February 1875	21 March 1877	2 years, 40 days
Colonial Treasurer	William Forster	9 February 1875	7 February 1876	363 days
Colonial Treasurer	Alexander Stuart	8 February 1876	21 March 1877	1 year, 41 days
Minister of Justice and Public Instruction; Representative of the Government in the Legislative Council	Joseph Docker MLC	9 February 1875	21 March 1877	2 years, 40 days
Secretary for Lands	Thomas Garrett	9 February 1875	5 February 1877	1 year, 362 days
Secretary for Lands	Ezekiel Baker	6 February 1877	21 March 1877	43 days
Secretary for Public Works	John Lackey	9 February 1875	21 March 1877	2 years, 40 days
Attorney General	William Dalley MLC (Note: A member of the Government without a seat in the Executive Council.)	9 February 1875	21 March 1877	2 years, 40 days
Secretary for Mines	John Lucas	9 February 1875	21 March 1877	2 years, 40 days
Postmaster-General	John Burns	9 February 1875	21 March 1877	2 years, 40 days

Ministers are members of the Legislative Assembly unless otherwise noted.

== See also ==
  - Members of Parliament
  - 1874–1877 Legislative Assembly
  - Legislative Council
  - Robertson ministries
  - First (1860–1861)
  - Second (1868–1870)
  - Fourth (1877)
  - Fifth (1885–1886)

== Notes ==
Preceded by First Parkes ministry	Third Robertson ministry 1875–1877	Succeeded by Second Parkes ministry
