= Members of the New South Wales Legislative Council, 1874–1877 =

Members of the New South Wales Legislative Council who served from 1874 to 1877 were appointed for life by the Governor on the advice of the Premier. This list includes members between the beginning of the 1874–75 colonial election on 8 December 1874 and the beginning of the 1877 colonial election on 24 October 1877. The President was John Hay.

Name	Years in office	Office
George Allen	1856–1861, 1861–1877	
John Blaxland	1863–1884	
William Busby	1867–1887	
William Byrnes	1858–1861, 1861–1891	
Alexander Campbell	1864–1890	
Charles Campbell	1870–1888	
John Campbell	1856, 1861–1886	
James Chisholm	1865–1888	
Edward Cox	1874–1883	
George Cox	1863–1901	
William Dalley (Note: William Dalley was appointed on 9 February 1875. and took his seat on the same day.)	1870–1873, 1875–1880, 1883–1888	Attorney General (9 February 1875 – 21 March 1877) (17 August 1877 – 17 December 1877)
Frederick Darley	1868–1886	
Leopold De Salis	1874–1898	
Joseph Docker	1856–1861, 1863–1884	Chairman of Committees (15 January 1873 – 9 February 1875); Minister of Justice and Public Instruction and Representative of the Government (9 February 1875 – 21 March 1877); Representative of the Government and Vice-President of the Executive Council (17 August 1877 – 17 December 1877)
John Fairfax (Note: John Fairfax died on 16 June 1877.)	1874–1877	
John Frazer	1874–1884	
Samuel Gordon	1861–1882	
William Grahame (Note: William Grahame was appointed on 19 January 1875, and took his seat on 2 February 1875.)	1875–1889	
John Hay	1867–1892	President
Thomas Holt	1868–1883	
Sir Joseph Innes	1873–1881	Representative of the Government (13 September 1873 – 8 February 1875); Attorney General (20 November 1873 – 8 February 1875); Chairman of Committees (9 February 1875 – 16 December 1880)
Francis Lord	1856–1861, 1864–1893	
Sir William Macarthur	1864–1882	
Sir William Manning (Note: Sir William Manning resigned on 8 May 1876 having been appointed a Judge of the Supreme court.)	1861–1876, 1888–1895	
Jacob Montefiore (Note: Jacob Montefiore resigned on 23 July 1877 to move to London.)	1856–1860, 1874–1877	
Henry Moore	1868–1888	
Edward Ogilvie	1863–1889	
Robert Owen	1868–1878	
John Richardson	1868–1887	
Bourn Russell	1858–1861, 1861–1880	
Saul Samuel	1872–1880	Postmaster-General and Vice-President of the Executive Council (3 December 1872 – 8 February 1875) (22 March 1877 – 16 August 1877)
Thomas Smart	1870–1881	
John Smith	1874–1885	
Sir Alfred Stephen (Note: Sir Alfred Stephen was appointed on 8 March 1875, and took his seat on 23 March 1875.)	1856–1858, 1875–1879, 1879–1885, 1886–1890	
Sir Edward Deas Thomson	1856–1861, 1861–1879	
John Watt	1861–1866, 1874–1890	
Elias Weekes	1865–1880	
James White	1874–1890	

== See also ==
- First Parkes ministry
- Third Robertson ministry
- Second Parkes ministry
- Fourth Robertson ministry
