= McQuade Park =

- Interactive map of McQuade Park
- 33.6103°S 150.8131°E
- Location: 361 George Street, Windsor, City of Hawkesbury, New South Wales, Australia

History
- Built: 1811–1994

Site notes
- Architect(s): Governor Macquarie; 1810–1811; James Meehan; surveyor 1811; G.B. White; surveyor 1827

McQuade Park is a heritage-listed park and sporting venue at 361 George Street, Windsor, City of Hawkesbury, New South Wales, Australia. The park was set aside by Governor Lachlan Macquarie in 1810, first surveyed by James Meehan in 1811, and re-surveyed and significantly expanded by G. B. White in 1827. It is also known as The Great Square, Church Green and Windsor Park. The property is owned by Hawkesbury City Council. It was added to the New South Wales State Heritage Register on 14 January 2011.

== History ==
The Hawkesbury region was inhabited by the Dharug people prior to European colonisation. The riparian area along the Hawkesbury River had been a source of food for the local Aboriginal people for over 50,000 years (it is known to the Dharug as Dyarrabin' or 'Deerubbin') and, with relatively frequent floods that spread enriched alluvium throughout the surrounding land, the region was known to be an abundant and reliable resource. It was also a place with strong social and spiritual significance.

Following the establishment of the colony of New South Wales, the new colonists quickly recognised the agricultural potential of the banks of the Hawkesbury River. This led to intensive farming of the area to supply food to the developing colony that was experiencing severe shortages in the early years. However, following flooding in 1799, 1800, 1806 and 1809, life for the colonists farming the flats of the Hawkesbury River was a hard one, fraught with potential devastation with any inundation of the river.

Governor Macquarie founded six new towns in the countryside of New South Wales during 1810, his first year of office. Unlike the first at Liverpool, the five towns on the Upper Hawkesbury and Lower Nepean (Windsor, Richmond, Wilberforce, Pitt Town and Castlereagh) were primarily created to assist existing farmers who suffered recurrent losses on the flood-plain. The Governor intended the new towns to have some common features, including a centrally sited square. Windsor was unique among the 1810 towns in incorporating an existing government village, in the area called Green Hills. As a result, there was already a square inside the area designated for the new town, but this public area, named Thompson Square by Macquarie, was at the extreme north-east end of the town and another square was planned from the outset in a more central position within the new grid-plan. This second reserve, which Macquarie called the Great Square, evolved into McQuade Park.

James Meehan, the surveyor, started to lay out the new central square on 9 January 1811. At that stage he envisaged it as occupying two whole rectangular sections in the town, constituting the link between the narrow north-east end of the town and the regular, broader grid-plan of the south-west end, set at a slight angle to the north-east part. Meehan measured the Great Square as 15 chains (300 metres) in length by 15.5 chains (310 metres) in depth, although a chain would be taken off on each of the four sides for a street of standard width. The square would then be reduced to 280 by 290 metres, though later surveys show the area as considerably less, at around 4 hectares (e.g., SRNSW, Map 5967 of 1835).

The church and cemetery reserve in 1811 was to occupy land immediately to the north of the square, as an extension of the town grid. This is shown clearly on the 1812 plan of the town, signed by Macquarie himself.

Meehan, most unusually, commented in his Field Book about the purpose of the Great Square. It was, he wrote, "intended as a Square or Open Area - as a parade or park for the use of the Town". The reference to "parade" refers to the military contingent stationed in the town.

It is not known whether the area of the square was already cleared in 1811, but a panorama of Windsor painted in 1816 shows the area empty both of houses and of trees, while the detailed vista of the town painted by Joseph Lycett in 1821-1822, which shows St Matthew's Anglican Church, confirms that no trees survived on the site of the square. It is likely that the area was used at this time for grazing, for military parades and for the occasional game of cricket between the military and the farmers.

By 1827, when new plans were drawn, the area of the Square had been more than doubled and its shape was no longer rectangular. The original Square which Meehan surveyed in 1811 is shown in red hatching on the map below. The only part which remained the same by 1827 was the southern edge, along George Street, although the George Street frontage was now extended to the west to a total of about 230 metres.

The Square had become an irregular pentagon, and it has largely retained its 1827 dimensions. The road to Richmond flanking the west side of the square is now Hawkesbury Valley Way, which runs along William Cox's original line. On the north, turning along the front of St Matthew's Anglican Church and its rectory (the 'Glebe House') is Moses Street, and the street on the east running almost at right angles from George Street up to the rectory garden is the present Tebbutt Street.

Although the Square was encircled by surveyed streets, the townsfolk from the populated part of the town to the north-east had by 1840 their own preferred informal pathway curving through the public space to the Anglican church and beyond to the Richmond road.

The inscription by Surveyor Galloway along the path he plotted through the Square around 1840 is: "Line of Road now used from Windsor to the Church". The north-south street shown running through the Square straight to St Matthew's is an entirely notional extension of Forbes Street north of George Street.

The square is on sloping ground and stumps from the early tree-felling remained a nuisance well into Queen Victoria's reign, although they did not prevent occasional use as a cricket-pitch from Macquarie's time onwards. Unlike Richmond's central reserve (Richmond Park), Windsor's square was not used for markets, which were held instead to the south of George Street. Because of its position, the square was closely associated with St Matthew's Anglican Church and by the 1840s it was regularly known as the Church Green (e.g. Sydney Herald, 5 June 1841; Votes & Proceedings, Legislative Assembly 1858, III, 445, p. 26). The 8-hectare area seems to have remained without plantings until the 1870s. By the 1840s cricket was a more regular feature on the Church Green and Aboriginal men played for the town (e.g. Windsor Express and Richmond Advertiser, 21 March 1844).

In the 1860s there was a massive move in the New South Wales government to create public reserves, for public recreation either general or specific. In 1868 the State government made Church Green into a Public Reserve (21 acres and 1 rod), at the same time as two hundred acres between Windsor and Richmond was gazetted as a racecourse and the much smaller (7 acres, 3 rods 37 perches) Richmond Park was created "for public recreation". No trustees were appointed at Windsor, unlike Richmond. The Municipality of Windsor was created in 1870 and in 1874 the government granted the reserve, which was still on crown land, to the Town Council. The grant was made "upon Trust to use the said Land as a Site for Public Recreation and for no other use or purpose whatsoever". The Council was responsible for making rules and regulations and for managing any structures which might be erected. There was provision for forfeiture (to the Crown) if the conditions were not met.

A small rectangular part of the land was in fact resumed by the Crown in 1972, the part then, and now, occupied by Windsor Bowling Club with a frontage onto Tebbutt Street. After this change took place, the crown issued a new land-grant for the remaining 8.125 hectares to the Council in August 1972. Fulfilling the forecast of James Meehan in 1811, road alterations had already nibbled away small parts of the periphery of the reserve in 1932, 1957 and 1961.

Before Windsor Municipal Council was given formal ownership of the land, it decided to name the reserve McQuade Park. John McQuade was mayor of the municipality in 1872. He was an ambitious local magistrate, but his father had been a transportee, who as an emancipist had established an inn in Windsor close to the Square, on the corner of Tebbutt and George Streets. John himself had built a fine house, Auburn Villa, just across Moses Street from the reserve, while his brother, William McQuade senior, lived close by, across the Richmond Road, in the old Cox house of Fairfield. On 6 June 1872 the Councillors voted to name the reserve after John McQuade and transmitted their decision to the Department of Lands, which still controlled the reserve. At the same time, the Council fenced the reserve for the first time in 1872, with a few seats for the public soon donated by individuals such as the mayor. The Council also established a Park Committee.

On 16 April 1873 the Council rescinded the motion of the previous June and renamed the area Windsor Park. But the Department of Lands refused to accept this change and wrote to the Council saying that the name would remain McQuade Park. In August the Council debated the issue again and, by the casting vote of the new mayor (no friend of John McQuade), decided to abide by the name Windsor Park.

In 1874 the reserve was granted formally to the Council, while John McQuade was again mayor. On his casting vote, the rescission motion of August 1873 was itself rescinded. The Council restored the name McQuade Park and erected a signpost with the new name painted in gold letters. This was promptly vandalised and in March 1878, when William Walker, the local solicitor and politician, was mayor, the Council voted to restore the name Windsor Park. Since the land was now owned in freehold by the Council, the Department of Lands did not enter into the controversy.

It seems that the decision of 6 March 1878 has never been rescinded, so technically the name of the reserve should be Windsor Park, but the long shadow of the McQuade family seems to have ensured that the name McQuade Park has de facto acceptance. The historian of Windsor, the Revd James Steele, wrote wryly in 1916 that "the local park is sometimes, and sometimes not, called McQuade Park". But the McQuades seem to have won the war, even if they lost the last engagement with Council in 1878.

In 1874 south side of Moses Street part of park was fenced, trenched and planted with c250 trees (from Messrs. Ferguson of Camden & others); a roadway was made across water hole (formerly a bog) leaving another water hole (the present lake); the George Street entrance gravelled; a Tebbutt Street entrance was made with a circle shrubbery formed, fenced and planted; a new roadway was formed from George Street to Richmond Road with trees planted on each side, some 40' (13m) wide and parts of the park were levelled and filled in.

Under successive local Councils, the park evolved as a public amenity, with a variety of sporting facilities, tree plantings, memorial areas and an attractive lake. Cricket had originally been played on rather rough ground opposite St Matthew's and Cornwallis Road between the arms of the curving pathway of the 1840s. In 1891 the present cricket-pitch was created to the east on newly levelled and formed land which had previously been transected by the curving pathway. In the 1880s it was described as an "eyesore" and over 100 trees were planted around the exterior of the park. In 1897 the Hawkesbury Cricket Club was formed. Windsor Park, the home ground of Windsor Cricket Club increasingly became the rival of Richmond Park as the ground of eminence in the district. A grandstand was ultimately constructed close to Tebbutt Street in 1937, and was opened by the Minister for Works & Local Government. To meet post-war demand in 1945 a second cricket wicket was laid in concrete on the north-west part of the park for the Don't Worry Cricket Club. Golden Fleece petrol sponsored cricket by contributing advertising on the oval and Council built a sightscreen and a further turf wicket.

A fountain was erected at the George Street entrance in 1891.

Football followed cricket, but as at Richmond, though goal posts were erected in the 1890s, the game played second-best to cricket well into the twentieth century.

Cycling was very popular in the late Victorian period and bicycle races were common from the 1890s onwards. Bicycle sports days became a crowd drawer and by 1900 "the attendance of district folk was very large", although a proper track was not constructed around the periphery of the park until 1945.

Because Windsor Park was so large, it could accommodate a wider diversity of activity than any other Hawkesbury park. The local tennis club was formed in 1923 with its courts in the south-east area where they are still located. Night lights were introduced in 1947 and the present club-house was opened in 1987.

Also during the inter-war years, the Windsor Bowling Club was allowed to form a green close to Tebbutt Street in 1931 and the relationship between the club and the Council was formalised by a lease in 1947. In 1972, however, the irregular rectangle of land leased by the Bowling Club was resumed by the crown and granted directly to the club as portion 346. Since 1972, this area has ceased to be part of the park. The Council received a new grant of the Park (reserve) excluding that section.

The other body which was allowed to build in the park was the Country Women's Association, which opened its brick hall close to George Street in 1938.

The park had from the outset been associated with the military. It had been envisaged as a parade ground in 1811. In 1861 the Governor Sir John Young presented colours to the state's Volunteer forces in the park (still then called the Church Green) and in 1874 the park became the official parade ground for the Windsor Volunteers. The involvement of local men and women in the Boer War was commemorated by the erection in 1903 of a fine War Memorial, with carvings by J. O'Kelly, in the south-east corner of the park and after World War I this was supplemented by a large War Memorial (gates), opened in 1923. This was extended to celebrate later warriors: ANZAC parades were held in the park and after World War II and subsequent engagements in Vietnam and Korea, additional honour lists were mounted on the World War I monument.

Captain James Cook was remembered in 1970 by the replacement of the old swampy pond near George Street by a hard-edged ornamental lake designed by landscape architect Peter Spooner, with a small island, accessible by a pedestrian bridge. The island was originally shaded by two willow-trees, but is now treeless. The lake became the focal point of a passive recreation area in the south-west sector of the park and was attractive for wedding receptions and other parties. This guaranteed the permanence of the "pon hole", the much-loved 19th century feature of the park which resisted all attempts by Councillors over the years to fill it in or securely enclose it. This is indicative of the late response to modernism in park and garden design in Australia.

The next historical commemoration came in 1994, when the Hawkesbury, and particularly Windsor, celebrated the two-hundredth anniversary of European settlement on this part of the river. Trees were extensively planted by Council, using donations from descendants of early families in memory of their forebears, who were named on small plaques. Although many individual trees have perished through the usual problems of maintenance, in particular the lack of consistent watering, the impact on the park was and remains considerable and, as the surviving trees grow, a wider impact will be visible. At the same time a bronze statue of Governor Macquarie was commissioned from a local sculptor, Frederic Chapeaux, who completed the work but died before his bronze casting was erected late in 1994 opposite St Matthew's Church. It was installed in a sandstone setting designed by local architect, Robert Pont.

Further works in this part of the park were installed in 2010 as part of the bicentenary commemoration of Governor Macquarie.

== Description ==
McQuade Park occupies an irregular pentagon. The east and south sides of Macquarie's original rectangular Great Square are still part of the park, along most of the frontage to Tebbutt Street and part of the frontage to George Street. The western side of the park is bounded by Hawkesbury Valley Way (known as Richmond Road until 2009). The two northerly sides of the park are bounded by the dog-leg of Moses Street.

Team sport dominates the northern sector of the park today. There are two ovals, primarily used for cricket. The principal playing field, with a grandstand, car-parking and amenities, is on the east, with a vehicular entry from Tebbutt Street. The playing area is delimited by a white picket fence installed early in the twenty-first century as the result of an initiative of the local Rotary Club. The other cricket pitch, known as the Don't Worry field, lies to the west and has no amenities.

Between the two ovals there is a memorial area, created in 1994. The central feature is Frederic Chepeaux's bronze statue of Governor Macquarie, standing at a stone plinth, facing St Matthew's Anglican Church and looking at plans of his Hawkesbury towns. The raised entry to the statue from Moses Street is flanked by eight pillars made of red brick and a triangular area in which a mosaic will be set late in 2010. Around the statue there is a low circular brick wall encompassed by a hedge planted at ground level below the artificial platform.

To the south of the grandstand there is a playground and bandstand.

The south-west sector of the park is used primarily for passive recreation around the lake close to George Street. This hard-edged free-form pond, normally adorned with water-lilies, is a modern development of the natural feature of a swampy area fed by a spring and a seasonal waterway. A small, grassy island, reached by a short pedestrian bridge, has been created in the northern part of the pond.

Immediately to the east of the pond, accessed from George Street, is the Country Women's Association meeting hall, an inter-war brick cottage within a small rectangular enclosure.

To the east of this hall is the Tennis Clubhouse and courts in a square area, also accessed from George Street.

To the north and north-east of the tennis courts is Windsor Bowling Club, with its clubhouse and two greens on a rectangular block of land, but this was excised from the park in 1972.

The south-east corner of the park, in a square enclosure bounded by George and Tebbutt Streets, is called Memorial Park, dedicated to war memorials. It is entered through an opening between two high brick walls bearing granite plaques which commemorate those who fought in the two world wars, in Vietnam and in Korea. Behind each wall is a field-gun. The square beyond is a formally laid-out garden around the very fine Boer War Memorial. This consists of a marble obelisk, placed on a sandstone plinth, dedicated to the three local men who died while serving in the Boer War. The stone section contains two fine relief carvings, each of a mounted trooper, carved by J. O'Kelly. A local female nurse who also served in South Africa is separately commemorated by a marble plaque placed on the perimeter of the small circular area around the obelisk.

Five Lagerstroemia indica (crepe myrtle trees) are planted around the Boer War Memorial on the park's north-east corner.

The major trees in McQuade Park, however, are clustered around the periphery and are narrow leaved ironbark (Eucalyptus crebra). The three surviving bunya pines (Araucaria bidwillii) are located on Moses Street opposite the Anglican church hall and on the corner of Moses Street and Tebbutt Street. A variety of other trees which are probably nineteenth- or early twentieth-century plantings are prominent along Moses Street, the northern part of Tebbutt Street and at the corner of Moses Street and Hawkesbury Valley Way. The species include Pinus pinea (stone pine) (2), Monterey pine (Pinus radiata) (1) and Melia azedarach var.australasica (white cedar). Other younger tree plantings include kurrajong (Brachychiton populneum), crepe myrtles, Chinese elms (Ulmus parvifolia), silky oak (Grevillea robusta), sweet gum (Liquidambar styraciflua), paperbark (Melaleuca sp.), turpentine (Syncarpia glomulifera) and bottle brush (Callistemon viminalis).

The principal areas of later tree-plantings are along a driveway which runs diagonally across the Park, south-east from Hawkesbury Valley Way, above the pond, and then turns south to George St between the CWA hall and the tennis courts. There is also a tree shield between the lake and Hawkesbury Valley Way. Many, but by no means all, of these more recent plantings commemorate individual "pioneers", a programme initiated during the 1994 celebrations of two hundred years of European settlement along the Upper Hawkesbury.

Because of the lack of built elements within the park along Moses St, the original relationship of the Great Square with the Anglican complex of St Matthew's and its rectory has remained highly legible.

The Park has seen many changes over 200 years, in vegetation, in surfaces and in built features. The present fabric is well maintained and reflects well the various stages of the Park's usage. Although some of these changes will be represented in archaeological deposits, it is not considered that the potential for meaningful archaeological excavation is high.

The two war memorials, which are the oldest built features of McQuade Park, are in excellent condition, while the more recent additions are also well maintained. The park retains the essential characteristics of Governor Macquarie’s original Great Square, with its historic layout and overall character largely preserved.

=== Modifications and dates ===
The history of McQuade Park is one of regular modification over two centuries. These changes are documented in the historical outline below. The principal changes in the built environment are:

- 1811 definition of the 'square'
- c. 1827 enlargement of reserve to its present size (more than double its 1811 size and no longer rectangular);
- 1874 south side of Moses Street part of park fenced, trenched and planted with c250 trees (from Mr.Ferguson of Camden & others); roadway made across water hole (formerly a bog) leaving another water hole (the present lake); George Street entrance gravelled; ?Tebbutt Street entrance made with circle shrubbery formed, fenced and planted; roadway from George Street to Richmond Road formed with trees planted on each side, some 40' (13m) wide; parts of park levelled and filled in;
- 1891 formal creation (levelled and formed) of present cricket oval; over 100 trees planted around exterior of park;
- 1903 Boer War Memorial;
- 1923 World War I Memorial; first tennis courts;
- 1931 bowling green built;
- 1932 road widening resumption part of reserve edges;
- 1937 grandstand;
- 1938 Country Women's Association hall opened;
- 1945 creation of Don't Worry cricket oval's concrete wicket;
- 1957 road widening resumption part of reserve edges;
- 1961 road widening resumption part of reserve edges;
- 1970 part of reserve resumed by the Crown – portion 346 fronting Tebbutt Street, for the Bowling Club tenancy;
- 1972 removal of Windsor Bowling Club land from park; re-issue of remaining 8.125 ha of reserve grant to Council;
- 1987 opening of present tennis club-house;
- 1994 statue of Governor Macquarie; planting of trees in commemoration of European pioneer settlers.

== Heritage listing ==
According to its New South Wales State Heritage Register listing, McQuade Park is of State heritage significance because it is a rare feature of Governor Macquarie's concept of a planned country town in 1810. A central square played a pivotal role in a Macquarie town and McQuade Park retains this role in relation to public activities and open space, as well as its relationship to one of the great early churches and cemeteries of New South Wales (St Matthews). The intimate association with Macquarie himself and with his chief surveyor, James Meehan, is of state significance.

The early adjustment in the shape and dimensions of the park is significant because it offers uncommonly legible evidence of the accommodations which colonial governments made with landowners to respect existing rights. The later extensions of functions within the park, including sporting, recreational and commemorative, have not obscured the original purpose of Macquarie's Great Square, though many of these additional functions have local rather than state significance. The Boer War Memorial is, however, an exception because of its rarity and because of the aesthetic merit of O'Kelly's carvings of mounted troopers from the South African engagement.

McQuade Park was listed on the New South Wales State Heritage Register on 14 January 2011 having satisfied the following criteria.

The place is important in demonstrating the course, or pattern, of cultural or natural history in New South Wales.

McQuade Park is of State Historical significance because it is a powerful testimony to the first stage of formal town-planning in New South Wales. The expanse of open green space in the centre of Governor Macquarie's most significant Hawkesbury town has survived and been expanded over two centuries and is still today an essential historic asset for public recreation, both sporting and passive. Its deliberate siting adjacent to the iconic Anglican Church of St Matthew and cemetery enhances the state significance of both park and church and cemetery.

The change in shape of the reserve from the original simple rectangle surveyed by James Meehan was a conscious historical act which demonstrates more forcibly than elsewhere among Macquarie's new towns the tensions which might exist between a newly planned town and the boundaries of existing land-holdings. The complex pentagon is the result of a series of adjustments to recognise property "lines". The boundaries of McQuade Park are of state significance as a rare visible expression of these accommodations between colonial governments and landowners.

The sporting potential of the substantial area of the reserve was largely realised after the area was transferred to the ownership of the local government authority in 1874. The establishment of formal ovals and tennis courts are of local significance.

The park was the chosen site for Windsor's memorials to those who fell or otherwise served in external wars. The Boer War memorial is notable at the state level because of its rarity and its quality of presentation, especially shown in the two stone relief carvings of mounted troopers. The later, more grandiose, memorial erected after World War I and reused to commemorate subsequent campaigns, is of high local significance.

The place has a strong or special association with a person, or group of persons, of importance of cultural or natural history of New South Wales's history.

McQuade Park has State associational significance because of its direct association with Governor Macquarie. The plan of Windsor drawn up in 1812 by the ex-convict surveyor, James Meehan, himself a figure of state significance, was signed, twice over, by Macquarie, who had personally selected the location of the Anglican church and the adjacent reserve. The bronze statue of Macquarie, erected in the park in 1994, is a signal recognition of this association.

The McQuade family after whom the park was named in a highly political and contested manoeuvre in the 1870s was significant not only in Windsor but also in Sydney. This association does not, however, meet this criterion at more than the local level.

The place is important in demonstrating aesthetic characteristics and/or a high degree of creative or technical achievement in New South Wales.

McQuade Park has aesthetic/technical State significance because of the high aesthetic values of the Boer War memorial with its O'Kelly carvings and its surrounding formal garden. The park as a whole with its extensive tree-plantings is an attractive and necessary adornment to the town, but the diffuseness of the multi-purpose planning of the modern park does not in itself qualify for significance at the state level. The park's extent and open nature are critical to, and form the green heart of modern Windsor and a crucial setting for St.Matthews Church, cemetery and Manse along with other key buildings facing it. McQuade Park has locally significant aesthetic value because its form and elements illustrate most of the uses to which an early town square might be put over a long period, including sports, passive recreation, public celebration and the commemoration of external wars.

The place has strong or special association with a particular community or cultural group in New South Wales for social, cultural or spiritual reasons.

McQuade Park has State social significance because the residents of the Windsor area have chosen the park as the place to plant trees in commemoration of early European settlers and as the location for a succession of war memorials and the important statue of Governor Macquarie.

The place possesses uncommon, rare or endangered aspects of the cultural or natural history of New South Wales.

McQuade Park has rarity value at State level because it is an example of the small number of town squares which survive and fulfil their original function in the eight country towns founded and planned by Governor Macquarie.

The Boer War was commemorated by only a few public monuments throughout New South Wales and the fine example in McQuade Park is of state significance.

The place is important in demonstrating the principal characteristics of a class of cultural or natural places/environments in New South Wales.

McQuade Park has State significant representative value because it illustrates most of the uses to which an early town square might be put over a long period, including sport of various kinds, passive recreation, public celebration and the commemoration of those who served in external wars.
