= Robyn Preston =

Australian politician

Robyn Preston MP
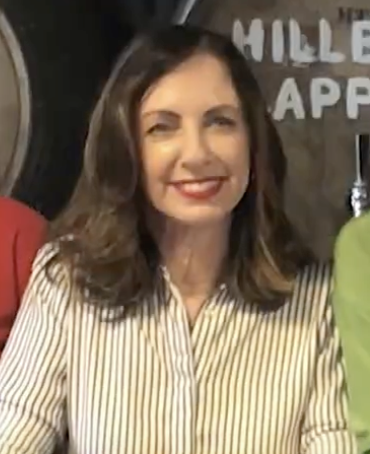
- Preston in 2020

Member of the New South Wales Parliament for Hawkesbury
- Incumbent
- Assumed office 23 March 2019
- Preceded by: Dominic Perrottet

Personal details
- Party: Liberal Party of Australia

Robyn Anne Preston is an Australian politician. She has been a member of the New South Wales Legislative Assembly since 2019, representing Hawkesbury for the Liberal Party. Her Electorate Office is situated within the grounds of Western Sydney University in Richmond.

Preston was on The Hills Shire Council for ten years, including a period as deputy mayor, and was also Australia's first female rugby league commentator on commercial television.

In the 1980s, Preston appeared as a centrefold model in Penthouse Magazine under the pseudonym of Kelly Russell. The photos re-emerged in 2018 as she was seeking preselection for the seat she eventually won and in 2012 as she sought to be elected to The Hills Shire Council. One of the people who had circulated them in 2018 was Peter Poulos who became a member of the Legislative Council in 2021 and was publicly criticised for it in the leadup to the 2023 election.

New South Wales Legislative Assembly
Preceded by Dominic Perrottet	Member for Hawkesbury; 2019–present	Incumbent
