= Bernie Deane =

Australian politician

Personal details
- Born: 2 January 1918 Mudgee, New South Wales
- Died: 1 April 1999 (aged 81) Windsor, New South Wales
- Party: Liberal Party

Bernard Sydney Llewellyn Deane (2 January 1918 – 1 April 1999) was an Australian politician. He was a member of the New South Wales Legislative Assembly from 1950 until 1972. He was a member of the Liberal Party.

Deane was born in Mudgee, New South Wales. He was the son of a coach builder and was educated to intermediate level at state high schools. He also studied for a religious ministry and was awarded doctorates in theology and philosophy. Deane initially worked as a farmer but was also employed in public relations and as the executive director of the Australian Clay Products Association. He unsuccessfully contested the seat of Hawkesbury at the 1947 state election and was subsequently elected to the New South Wales Parliament as the Liberal member for that seat at the election in 1950. At that election, following a re-distribution, Hawkebury had become a safe Liberal seat and the sitting member, Labor's Frank Finnan, decided to contest the safe Labor seat of Darlinghurst. Deane retained the seat at 7 subsequent elections until he resigned in 1972. He did not hold ministerial, parliamentary or party office.

New South Wales Legislative Assembly
Preceded by Frank Finnan	Member for Hawkesbury; 1950 – 1972	Succeeded by Kevin Rozzoli
