= Henry McQuade =

Australian politician

Henry Michael Hale McQuade (2 July 1852 – 20 November 1893), generally known as Harry McQuade, was an Australian politician.

He was born at Windsor to landowner William McQuade and Amelia Anne Hale. He became a landowner himself, and on 1 April 1878 he married Cecily King, with whom he had three children. He was elected to the New South Wales Legislative Assembly for Windsor in an 1880 by-election, but was defeated at the general election later that year. In 1882 he returned to the Assembly as the member for Hawkesbury, but he was defeated again in 1885. McQuade died at Elizabeth Bay in 1893.

Their daughter Amelia McQuade married cellist Jean Gérardy at St James's, Manchester Square, London on 8 October 1907.

New South Wales Legislative Assembly
Preceded by Richard Driver	Member for Windsor; 1880	Abolished
Preceded by Alexander Bowman	Member for Hawkesbury; 1882–1885	Succeeded by Alexander Bowman
