= Henry Moses (politician) =

Australian politician

Henry Moses (2 November 1832 – 19 June 1926) was an Australian politician.

He was born at Windsor to baker Uriah Moses and his wife Ann. Educated locally, he went to the goldfields before becoming a miller a Windsor and eventually a pastoralist with extensive property. On 19 May 1857 he married Ann Primrose, with whom he had ten children. In 1869 he was elected to the New South Wales Legislative Assembly for Hawkesbury, serving until he retired in 1880. He returned in 1882 as a member for Canterbury, but in 1885 was elevated to the Legislative Council, where he remained until 1923. Moses died at Potts Point in 1926.

New South Wales Legislative Assembly
Preceded by James Cunneen	Member for Hawkesbury; 1869–1880; Served alongside: William Piddington/Alexander Bowman	Succeeded by Alexander Bowman
Preceded by William Henson	Member for Canterbury; 1882–1885; Served alongside: William Pigott/Mark Hammond, Septimus Stephen	Succeeded by William Henson
