= Brinsley Hall =

Australian politician

Brinsley Hall (26 October 1862 – 8 May 1940) was an Australian politician.

He was born along the Macdonald River near St Albans in New South Wales, the son of William Hall, a farmer. He attended Windsor Grammar School and then worked as a farmer in outback New South Wales, Victoria and Queensland. In 1885 he married Anicus Kate George, with whom he had four children. After a year in New Zealand, he managed the family property on the Hawkesbury River, becoming active in local agricultural circles. In 1901 he was elected to the New South Wales Legislative Assembly as the member for Hawkesbury. Initially a member of the Progressive Party, he transferred to the Liberal Party following the Progressives' collapse in 1904. He held the seat until his defeat as a Nationalist candidate in 1917. Hall died in Darlinghurst in 1940.

New South Wales Legislative Assembly
Preceded by William Morgan	Member for Hawkesbury; 1901–1917	Succeeded by Bruce Walker
