= Municipality of Windsor =

Former local government area in New South Wales, Australia

- Local government area
- Country: Australia
- State: New South Wales
- Region: Greater Western Sydney
- Established: 4 March 1871
- Abolished: 1 January 1981
- Council seat: Council Chambers (1891–1966); Council Chambers (1966–1981)

Population
  - Total: 18,550 (1976 census)
- Parish: St Matthew
LGAs around Municipality of Windsor
| Colo | | Colo |
| Blue Mountains | Municipality of Windsor | Baulkham Hills |
| Penrith | | Blacktown |

The Municipality of Windsor was a local government area of Greater Western Sydney, New South Wales, Australia. The municipality was proclaimed as the Borough of Windsor on 4 March 1871 and was centred on the Town of Windsor. In 1949, with the passing of the Local Government (Areas) Act 1948, the council doubled in size with the amalgamation of the Municipality of Richmond to the west. On 1 January 1981, Windsor merged with the Colo Shire Council to the north, forming the Hawkesbury Shire (City of Hawkesbury from 1989).

== Council history ==
=== Windsor District Council ===
First settled by Europeans in 1794 in a bid to acquire arable land to feed the increasing population of the penal colony at Sydney, Windsor was proclaimed a Town in December 1810 by Governor of New South Wales Lachlan Macquarie, when he established the five Macquarie Towns in the Hawkesbury River area: Castlereagh, Pitt Town, Richmond, Wilberforce and Windsor. Windsor's place on the river, meant that it was an important location for provided the fledgling Colony of New South Wales with half its annual grain requirements. On 24 July 1843, the Windsor District Council was proclaimed by Governor Sir George Gipps, as part of an early attempt to establish local government administration throughout the colony. Established under the Constitution Act 1842, the District Council comprised a Warden, William Cox (son of pioneer William Cox), and seven Councillors, Josiah Allen Betts, Robert Fitzgerald, Francis Beddek, Charles Tompson, Thomas Tebbutt, and Thomas Arndell.

The first quarterly meeting of the Windsor District Council was held on 12 August 1843 and the council's main functions included education, land valuation, and public works (such as road maintenance). This experiment in local government was not very successful, with much public opposition focused on the issue of increased taxation, and a lack of oversight and faulty administration led to the collapse of many of these District Councils. The Windsor District Council had ceased to exist by 1858, when the NSW Parliament passed the Municipalities Act, which allowed for the creation of Municipalities and Boroughs.

=== Borough and Municipality ===
Under the succeeding Municipalities Act, 1867, which allowed for residents to petition the Colonial Government for incorporation, a petition signed by 242 Windsor residents, amongst a population of 1,902 residents in the 1861 Census, was sent to the Governor in October 1870. The petition was subsequently accepted and on 4 March 1871, the "Borough of Windsor" was proclaimed by the Governor The Earl Belmore.

The first election was held on 1 June 1871 for nine Aldermen. On 7 June Robert Dick was elected the first mayor and John Thomas Smith was appointed the first Council Clerk. The neighbouring Richmond Borough Council to the west followed on 18 June 1872. The first meeting was held at the Windsor Court House, the second in the School of Arts, and afterwards in the Oddfellows' Hall to 1891.

In 1890 the municipality acquired the 1879 post and telegraph office on George Street at the junction of Christie Street opposite Windsor Public School in exchange for a piece of land that was added to the public school grounds. On 25 January 1891, Council reopened the building as their first Council Chambers and held their first meeting there on 22 April 1891. From 28 December 1906, following the passing of the Local Government Act, 1906, boroughs ceased to be a category of local government and the council was renamed as the "Municipality of Windsor". The area was also enlarged to include rural areas.

After Council in 1927 voted to reject a proposal to borrow £10,800 for the erection of a new town hall, it was nevertheless recognised that the 1891 Council Chambers were "dilapidated and a disgrace to the town". A new Council Chambers on the same site was accepted by Council in 1934, with a tender for £1,182 accepted in April. The old chambers were quickly demolished and the foundation of the Georgian revival Inter-War Free Classical building by architect John Barr (noted for his work on St Andrew's Canberra, and St Paul's Cathedral, Melbourne) was officially laid by the Minister for Local Government, Eric Spooner, on 16 June 1934. The new Council Chambers were officially opened by the Member for Hawkesbury (and grandson of former Windsor Mayor, William Walker), Bruce Walker Jr, on 13 October 1934.

=== Later history ===
By the end of the Second World War, the NSW Government had realised that its ideas of infrastructure expansion could not be effected by the present system of the patchwork of small municipal councils across Sydney and the Minister for Local Government, Joseph Cahill, following the recommendations of the 1945–46 Clancy Royal Commission on Local Government Boundaries, passed a bill in 1948 that abolished a significant number of those councils. Under the Local Government (Areas) Act 1948 (effective 1 January 1949), Windsor Municipal Council merged with the Municipality of Richmond, adding the Town of Richmond, to form a reconstituted Windsor municipality.

By 1966, the 1934 Council Chambers was considered too small for the greatly-enlarged municipality and Council built new Council Chambers and offices further down at 366 George Street, opposite McQuade Park in 1966, which were renovated and extended in 1980–81 to become the Hawkesbury Council Chambers, where the City of Hawkesbury meets today.

With the passing of the Local Government Areas Amalgamation Act 1980, on 1 January 1981 Windsor Municipal Council merged with the neighbouring Colo Shire to form the Hawkesbury Shire, which became the City of Hawkesbury from 1989.

== Mayors ==
| Term | Mayor | Notes |
|---|---|---|
| 7 June 1871 – 14 February 1872 | Robert Dick | |
| 14 February 1872 – 13 February 1873 | John Michael McQuade | |
| 13 February 1873 – 11 February 1874 | William Dean | |
| 11 February 1874 – 10 February 1875 | John Michael McQuade | |
| 10 February 1875 – 9 February 1876 | John Johnson | |
| 9 February 1876 – 15 February 1877 | William Irons Crew | |
| 15 February 1877 – 13 February 1878 | William Gosper | |
| 13 February 1878 – 12 February 1879 | William Walker | |
| 12 February 1879 – 11 February 1880 | Thomas Primrose | |
| 11 February 1880 – 9 February 1881 | William Moses | |
| 9 February 1881 – 15 February 1882 | Francis Simon | |
| 15 February 1882 – 14 February 1883 | Robert McNiven | |
| 14 February 1883 – 15 February 1884 | Thomas Primrose | |
| 15 February 1884 – 11 February 1885 | William Moses | |
| 11 February 1885 – 14 February 1886 | William Farmer Linsley | |
| 14 February 1886 – 10 February 1887 | Thomas Primrose | |
| 10 February 1887 – 11 February 1891 | Frederick James Mortley | |
| 11 February 1891 – 10 February 1892 | William Gosper | |
| 10 February 1892 – 17 February 1893 | Daniel Holland | |
| 17 February 1893 – 16 February 1894 | William Hessel Dean | |
| 16 February 1894 – 12 February 1895 | Daniel Holland | |
| 12 February 1895 – 12 August 1903 | John Jackson Paine | |
| 17 August 1903 – 8 February 1904 | Thomas Primrose | |
| 8 February 1904 – 16 February 1906 | Frederick James Mortley | |
| 16 February 1906 – 8 February 1907 | William Hessel Dean | |
| 8 February 1907 – 14 February 1910 | Albert Charles Hannabus | |
| 14 February 1910 – 3 February 1911 | J. W. Ward | |
| 3 February 1911 – 1 March 1914 | James William Chandler | |
| 1 March 1914 – 13 October 1915 | William Hessel Dean | |
| 13 October 1915 – 14 February 1916 | James William Chandler | |
| 14 February 1916 – 6 February 1918 | Robert Hewlett Judd | |
| 6 February 1918 – 14 April 1919 | James William Chandler | |
| 16 April 1919 – 11 December 1925 | John William Ross | |
| 11 December 1925 – 10 September 1931 | William Hessel Dean | |
| 24 September 1931 – 20 December 1932 | Rev. Norman Jenkyn | |
| 20 December 1932 – 11 December 1941 | John James McLeod | |
| 11 December 1941 – 10 December 1942 | Victor William Gillespie | |
| 10 December 1942 – 5 December 1950 | William John Ross | |
| 5 December 1950 – December 1956 | Victor William Gillespie OBE | |
| December 1956 – 31 December 1980 | | |
