= Bruce Walker (politician, born 1897) =

Australian politician

(Ronald) Bruce Walker (7 December 1897 – 1981) was an Australian politician.

== Early life ==
He was born at Windsor, to Lucinda Isabel Rowthorn and (Robert) Bruce Walker, who was also a politician. Ronald attended Sydney Grammar School and was admitted as a solicitor in 1925. On 19 December 1923 he married Muriel Smith, with whom he had a son. He joined the family law firm, William Walker & Son, becoming a senior partner in 1932.

== Member of parliament ==
In 1932 he succeeded his father in the New South Wales Legislative Assembly as the United Australia Party member for Hawkesbury. He was re-elected in 1935, and 1938, serving until 1941.

== Conspiracy conviction ==
In August 1939 he was arrested and charged with conspiracy to defraud members of the public in connection with the Scottish Loan and Finance Company of which he was a director. After a 36-day hearing in the Supreme Court in 1941, in which Walker addressed the jury for 9 hours, Walker and one of his co-accused, solicitor Albert Levitus, were convicted. Justice Sir Percival Halse Rogers sentenced Walker to three years imprisonment and Levitus to five years imprisonment. Walker was struck off the roll of solicitors in 1941. He was released from prison in July 1943.

== Later life ==
Walker became an estate agent and was elected an alderman of the Windsor Council in 1945. Walker died in 1981 (aged 83–84) .

== See also ==
- Members of the New South Wales Legislative Assembly
- 1932-1935
- 1935-1938
- 1938-1941
- Results of the New South Wales state elections for Hawkesbury
- 1932
- 1935
- 1938

New South Wales Legislative Assembly
Preceded by Bruce Walker Sr	Member for Hawkesbury; 1932–1941	Succeeded by Frank Finnan
