= Steven Pringle =

Australian politician

Steven Bruce Scott Pringle is a naval officer in the Royal Australian Naval Reserves and former politician. He was the member of the New South Wales Legislative Assembly from March 2003 to March 2007, representing the Electoral district of Hawkesbury.

He is a past mayor of Hornsby Shire Council, having served four terms (emeritus mayor) and was the director of community engagement at Macquarie University.

Pringle was elected at the 2003 New South Wales state election with 64% of the 2pp vote, having defeated in a single ballot veteran sitting MP Kevin Rozzoli, Boyd Falconer, Bart Bassett and Kevin Connolly in a Liberal Party preselection contest. He represented the party until October 2006, when he resigned to sit as an independent, after losing Liberal preselection in controversial circumstances as below. He was defeated (46.4% 2pp) in a closely fought contest at the 2007 state election by Liberal candidate Ray Williams.

== Background ==
Pringle grew up in Chatswood, New South Wales and studied at Macquarie University, attaining a Bachelor of Arts, majoring in economics and history, a Diploma of Education and a Master of Arts, majoring in politics. It was at university where he first became involved in politics, joining the university Liberal Party of Australia Club and serving in positions on the University Council, Union Board and Student Council, simultaneously, the first person to do so. After graduating from university, Pringle joined the Bank of NSW and then the Royal Australian Navy, attaining the rank of lieutenant commander. He served in a variety of postings, including HMA Ships Creswell, Kuttabul, Platypus, Penguin, Naval Support Command, Nirimba and Watson. He was a visiting military fellow at the Australian Defence Force Academy.

== Local government career ==
Pringle had a strong interest in local issues, and in 1987 he was elected to Hornsby Shire Council in northern Sydney, as an independent, a position he held until retiring in 2003. With strong community support, he topped the poll in each of the elections subsequent to 1987. Pringle was elected president of Hornsby Shire Council in 1992, becoming its youngest president thus far at the age of 34. He went on to serve as mayor in 1996, 1999 and 2002. Pringle was a community activist supported by a range of local groups, including the Epping and Pennant Hills Civic Trusts. At Hornsby Shire Council, he established and led the successful Bushland Management, Heritage, Drainage and Agenda 21 Committees. He also led the development of the Hornsby Shire Housing Strategy and chaired both the National Parks and Wildlife Service Northern Sydney Advisory Committee and Lane Cove State Recreation Area Trust.

== Parliamentary aspirations ==
Pringle first attempted to enter State Parliament in 1990, contesting preselection for a by-election in the safe electoral district of The Hills, but came a close second to car dealer Tony Packard. Pringle did not stand for re-election as mayor in 1993, and instead contested preselection for the safe electoral district of Northcott for the New South Wales State Election, 1995, losing to then State Director and subsequently Premier Barry O'Farrell. Pringle gained various party positions, including North-West Regional President. He served three more terms as shire president/mayor (The term shire president was replaced by mayor) in the late 1990s and early 2000s, before making another bid to enter state parliament.

Pringle contested preselection for a 2002 by-election in the electoral district of Hornsby, won by Judy Hopwood. He later defeated Kevin Rozzoli, a former Speaker and incumbent of nearly 30 years, for preselection in the electoral district of Hawkesbury for the 2003 New South Wales state election. The then mayors of Hawkesbury City Council and Baulkham Hills Shire Council stood against him, but Pringle nevertheless easily retained the seat for the Liberal Party and was elected to Parliament.

== Parliament ==
Pringle was elected Member for Hawkesbury at the general election held on 22 March 2003 and held the seat until the next general election held on 2 March 2007. Pringle showcased some of the products of his electorate through the Hawkesbury Harvest (local produce and products) which were displayed in the foyer of parliament during his inaugural speech. Pringle particularly focused on the issues of planning, transport education and the environment. He was the Shadow Parliamentary Secretary for Transport in 2006 and a member of the Statuary Public Works, Lane Cove Tunnel Inquiry and Valuer General's Committees. He actively supported local businesses and groups and was heavily involved in community activities, raising many local issues in Parliament.

Though he held Christian beliefs, and attended the same parliamentary prayer group as hard-right factional power-broker David Clarke, he was always aligned with the party's moderate faction. This allegiance began threatening his career as early as 2005, only two years into his term, when reports emerged that the hard-right was engaging in branch stacking in Hawkesbury as a prelude to a possible preselection challenge. Several months later, in the wake of the resignation of moderate Opposition Leader John Brogden (politician), Pringle was one of a number of MPs who reportedly had their preselection threatened if they did not vote for the hard-right's preferred candidate, Peter Debnam, as Brogden's replacement, a campaign which ultimately sparked the withdrawal of Debnam's only opponent Barry O'Farrel from the race. A State Electorate boundary redistribution altered the balance between moderate and right branches. The tensions from the previous year were confirmed when, on 2 September 2006, Australian politician Ray Williams, a Baulkham Hills Shire Councillor backed by the hard-right faction, challenged Pringle. This came in the wake of reports that numbers in one branch in Pringle's electorate had swelled from 17 to 500 (with none actually living in the suburb) due to an influx of Lebanese Australian members, and public allegations by Howard Crawford, party president for the nearby electoral district of Londonderry that a campaign of "branch-stacking, malpractice and political promises" was being used to undermine Pringle. Reports also emerged during the campaign that Williams had claimed that he could secure a $100,000 donation to the party from a property development company if he were elected, which later sparked controversy and an enforced veto of the move from party leader Peter Debnam. Pringle was endorsed by Debnam to remain as a member of parliament. Although Debnam's intervention had saved numerous sitting members under attack over the previous year, it was not enough to save Pringle, who was defeated by Williams on 15 October. It was subsequently reported that Pringle had obtained approximately 50% of the local branch vote in spite of the branch stacking, but had been soundly defeated by the votes of the hard right-dominated state council and state executive. Pringle responded to news of his preselection defeat by declaring "betrayal and disgust" at what had occurred, labeling Debnam either "lying or impotent". He resigned from the Liberal Party during Question Time in Parliament on 17 October, announcing his intention to serve out his term as an independent, and recontest his seat as an independent. The government used its numbers to suspend standing orders so Pringle could speak at a time of maximum coverage, and in an explosive attack Pringle criticized Clarke, Debnam and the Liberal Party, claiming that the party was being controlled by "an exclusive sect" – referring to Clarke's membership of Opus Dei – labelling Clarke "the Godfather", and calling the preselection "an absolute rort". He further accused the party of being preoccupied with issues such as homosexuality and drug injecting rooms, instead of the real issues of health, transport, education and the environment and claimed that it "does not deserve to govern".

New South Wales Legislative Assembly
Preceded by Kevin Rozzoli	Member for Hawkesbury; 2003 – 2007	Succeeded by Ray Williams
