= Parkes ministry (1877) =

Second New South Wales government ministry led by Henry Parkes

Second Parkes ministry
- 16th Cabinet of the Colony of New South Wales

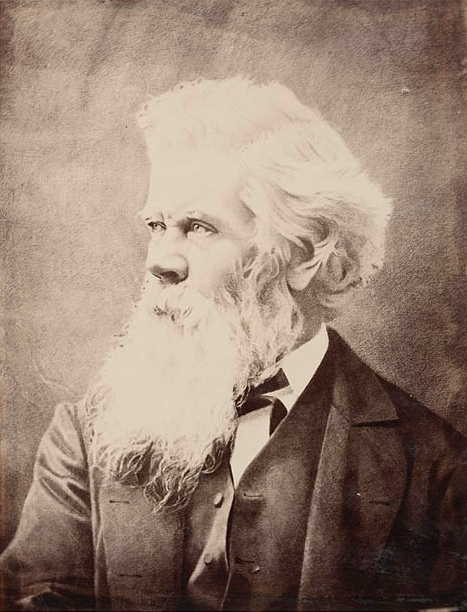
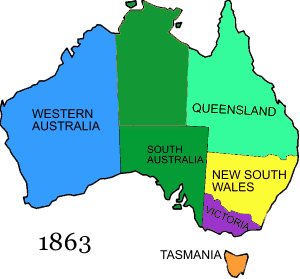
- Premier Henry Parkes and the Colony of New South Wales (1863–1900)
- Date formed: 22 March 1877
- Date dissolved: 16 August 1877

People and organisations
- Monarch: Queen Victoria
- Governor: Hercules Robinson
- Head of government: Henry Parkes
- No. of ministers: 8
- Member party: unaligned
- Status in legislature: Minority government
- Opposition party: unaligned
- Opposition leader: John Robertson

History
- Predecessor: Third Robertson ministry
- Successor: Fourth Robertson ministry

The second Parkes ministry was the sixteenth ministry of the Colony of New South Wales, and was led by Sir Henry Parkes. It was the second of five occasions that Parkes was Leader of the Government.

Having served in the New South Wales Legislative Council between 1854 and 1856, Parkes was elected in the first free elections for the New South Wales Legislative Assembly held in 1856, however resigned from Parliament later that year. He served in the Assembly on several occasions, between 1858 and 1870, being forced to resign on at least on occasion due to his personal insolvency. He came to power as Premier on the first occasion in 1872, serving as Premier for a period of three years. However, Parkes lost the confidence of the Assembly following Governor Robinson's decision to release of the bushranger Frank Gardiner led to the defeat of the ministry in 1875.

John Robertson served as Leader of the Government between 1875 and 1877, before Robertson's supply bill was defeated in the Assembly and the Governor had refused to dissolve the parliament without supply. Parkes formed his second ministry in a challenging environment where both Parkes and Robertson shared equal representation in the Legislative Assembly and business was sometimes at a standstill.

The title of Premier was widely used to refer to the Leader of Government, but not enshrined in formal use until 1920.

There was no party system in New South Wales politics until 1887. Under the constitution, ministers were required to resign to re-contest their seats in a by-election when appointed. Such ministerial by-elections were usually uncontested and on this occasion a poll was required for The Hawkesbury (William Piddington) and he was comfortably re-elected. The six other ministers, Henry Parkes (East Sydney), Francis Suttor (Bathurst), Richard Driver (Windsor), James Hoskins (The Tumut), William Windeyer (University of Sydney) and George Lloyd (Newcastle), were re-elected unopposed.

This ministry covers the period from 22 March 1877 until 16 August 1877, when Parkes was in turn unable to obtain supply and resigned when Robertson indicated that he was able to form a government.

== Composition of ministry ==
Portfolio	Minister	Term start	Term end	Term length
Premier; Colonial Secretary	Sir Henry Parkes	22 March 1877	16 August 1877	147 days
Colonial Treasurer	William Piddington	22 March 1877	16 August 1877	147 days
Minister of Justice and Public Instruction	Francis Suttor	22 March 1877	16 August 1877	147 days
Secretary for Lands	Richard Driver	22 March 1877	16 August 1877	147 days
Secretary for Public Works	James Hoskins	22 March 1877	16 August 1877	147 days
Attorney General	William Windeyer (Note: A member of the government without a seat in the Executive Council.)	22 March 1877	16 August 1877	147 days
Secretary for Mines	George Lloyd	22 March 1877	16 August 1877	147 days
Postmaster-General; Representative of the Government in Legislative Council	Saul Samuel MLC	22 March 1877	16 August 1877	147 days

Ministers are members of the Legislative Assembly unless otherwise noted.

== See also ==
  - Members of Parliament
  - 1874–1877 Legislative Assembly
  - Legislative Council
  - Parkes ministries
  - First (1872–1875)
  - Third (1878–1883)
  - Fourth (1887–1889)
  - Fifth (1889–1891)

Preceded by Third Robertson ministry	Second Parkes ministry 1877	Succeeded by Fourth Robertson ministry
