= Frank Finnan =

Australian politician (1897–1966)

The Honourable Frank Finnan CBE
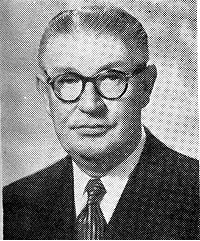

Minister for Labour and Industry and Minister for Social Welfare
- In office 9 March 1948 – 23 February 1953
- Premier: William McKell; James McGirr; Joseph Cahill
- Preceded by: Jack Baddeley
- Succeeded by: Abe Landa

Personal details
- Born: 23 September 1897 The Rocks, New South Wales, Australia
- Died: 21 March 1966 (aged 68) Waratah, New South Wales, Australia
- Party: Labor Party

Francis Joseph Finnan CBE (23 September 1897 – 21 March 1966) was an Australian politician and a member of the New South Wales Legislative Assembly from 1941 until 1953. He was a member of the Labor Party and held numerous ministerial positions between 1947 and 1953.

== Early life and career ==
Finnan was born in The Rocks and was educated at St Aloysius' College (Sydney). He initially worked as a shearer in Queensland and was an official in the Australian Workers' Union. By 1930, Finnan had returned to Sydney and was involved in the management of Labor papers including Common Cause and the Labor Daily.

== Political career ==
He was elected to the New South Wales Parliament as the Labor member for Hawkesbury at the 1941 state election. The sitting United Australia Party member, Bruce Walker Jr, didn't stand as he was on trial for conspiracy charges, and Finnan's victory helped Labor gain a majority at the election. He held the seat at the next 2 elections but a redistribution prior to the 1950 state election made the seat unwinnable for Labor. During the premierships of James McGirr and Joseph Cahill, Finnan held numerous ministerial positions including Minister for Tourism, and Minister for Labour and Industry and Social Welfare.

Finnan successfully stood for the new seat of Darlinghurst at the 1950 election. Darlinghurst was abolished in the 1952 redistribution, he lost the preselection contest for Concord, and was unsuccessful in an attempt to win the seat of Albury. He then retired from state politics and was granted retention of the "Honourable" title for life by Queen Elizabeth II.

== Later life and career ==
Finnan then moved to Newcastle where he was appointed by Premier Cahill as president of the Hunter District Water Board. In 1960, he was appointed a Commander of the Order of the British Empire (CBE). Reappointed in 1960, when he reached the statutory retiring age in 1962, the government passed special legislation enabling him to continue for another term, serving a further two years before retiring in 1964.

Finnan was a council-member (1959–66) of Newcastle University College (University of Newcastle from 1965), chairman of the Hunter Valley Research Foundation, a member of the Newcastle Regional Development Committee and of the Newcastle International Sports Centre Trust, and a director of the Mater Misericordiae Hospital, Waratah. Finnan was a patient of the same hospital and died there in 1966.

Finnan Oval in Blackalls Park, Lake Macquarie, is named after him on land owned by Hunter Water.

New South Wales Legislative Assembly
Preceded by Bruce Walker Jr	Member for Hawkesbury; 1941 – 1950	Succeeded by Bernie Deane
New district	Member for Darlinghurst; 1950 – 1953	District abolished
Political offices
Preceded by Clive Evatt	Minister in Charge of Tourist Activities Immigration; 1947 – 1948	Succeeded by Claude Matthews
Preceded by Jack Baddeley	Minister for Labour and Industry and Social Welfare; 1948 – 1953	Succeeded by Abe Landa
Government offices
Preceded by Charles George Schroder	President of the Hunter District Water Board; 1953 – 1964	Succeeded by Frank Keith Duncan
