= Alexander Bowman (Australian politician) =

Australian politician (1838–1892)

Alexander Bowman (1838 – 10 July 1892) was an Australian politician.

He was born in Richmond. The Bowman brothers: George Pearce Bowman (1821–1870), pastoralist, Robert Bowman (1830–1873), medical practitioner, and Alexander Bowman (1838–1892), parliamentarian, were the eldest, fifth and seventh sons of Eliza Sophia Pearce and George Bowman, pioneers of the Hawkesbury region. He was the grandson of John Bowman.

He attended Cape's College at Darlinghurst and Carey's School at Windsor before studying at the University of Sydney, from which he received a Bachelor of Arts in 1858. He moved to Queensland in 1859 but later that year returned to New South Wales, living at Singleton where he became a racehorse breeder and pastoralist. On 25 March 1881 he married Johanna Heuston, with whom he had three children. He served as a Singleton alderman and then as mayor for seven years. In 1877 he was elected to the New South Wales Legislative Assembly as the member for Hawkesbury. Defeated in 1882, he was re-elected in 1885, becoming associated with the Free Trade Party. Bowman held his seat until his death at Glebe in 1892.

New South Wales Legislative Assembly
Preceded by William Piddington	Member for Hawkesbury; 1877–1882; Served alongside: Henry Moses/none	Succeeded by Henry McQuade
Preceded by Henry McQuade	Member for Hawkesbury; 1885–1892	Succeeded by Sydney Burdekin
