= Electoral district of Darlinghurst =

Former state electoral district of New South Wales, Australia

Darlinghurst was an electoral district of the Legislative Assembly in the Australian state of New South Wales. Named after and including Darlinghurst, it was created in the 1904 re-distribution of electorates following the 1903 New South Wales referendum, which required the number of members of the Legislative Assembly to be reduced from 125 to 90. It consisted of parts of Paddington and the abolished seats of Sydney-Fitzroy and Sydney-Bligh. It was abolished in 1920 with the introduction of proportional representation and was absorbed into the multi-member electorate of Sydney. It was briefly recreated in 1950 before being abolished in 1953.

== Members for Darlinghurst ==
First incarnation (1904–1920)
Member	Party	Term
Daniel Levy	Liberal Reform	1904–1917
Daniel Levy	Nationalist	1917–1920
Second incarnation (1950–1953)
Member	Party	Term
Frank Finnan	Labor	1950–1953

== Election results ==
1950 New South Wales state election: Darlinghurst
Party	Candidate	Votes	%	±%
Liberal	John Paget	10,553	47.8	
Labor	Frank Finnan	10,505	47.6	
Communist	Adam Ogston	1,012	4.6	
Total formal votes		22,070	97.3	
Informal votes		603	2.7	
Turnout		22,673	89.0	
Two-party-preferred result
Labor	Frank Finnan	11,401	51.7	
Liberal	John Paget	10,669	48.3	
Labor notional hold				

Frank Finnan (Labor) was the member for Hawkesbury.
