= William Morgan (New South Wales politician) =

Australian politician

William Morgan (17 March 1842 – 31 July 1907) was an Australian politician.

He was born at Kelso to brickmaker William Morgan and Jeanette Williamson. He was a solicitor, practising in Bathurst (1867–82) and Sydney (1882–1907). In 1894 he was elected to the New South Wales Legislative Assembly as the member for Hawkesbury; he was generally considered a Free Trader. He held the seat until his defeat in 1901. Morgan, who was unmarried, died at Paddington in 1907.

New South Wales Legislative Assembly
Preceded by Sydney Burdekin	Member for Hawkesbury; 1894–1901	Succeeded by Brinsley Hall
