= Ray Williams (politician) =

Australian politician

The Honourable Ray Williams MP

Minister for Multiculturalism
- In office 30 January 2017 – 23 March 2019
- Premier: Gladys Berejiklian
- Preceded by: John Ajaka
- Succeeded by: John Sidoti (as Minister for Sport, Multiculturalism, Seniors and Veterans)

Minister for Disability Services
- In office 30 January 2017 – 23 March 2019
- Premier: Gladys Berejiklian
- Preceded by: John Ajaka
- Succeeded by: Gareth Ward (as Minister for Families, Communities and Disability Services)

Member of the New South Wales Legislative Assembly for Kellyville
- Incumbent
- Assumed office 25 March 2023
- Preceded by: Seat established

Member of the New South Wales Legislative Assembly for Castle Hill
- In office 28 March 2015 – 25 March 2023
- Preceded by: Dominic Perrottet
- Succeeded by: Mark Hodges
- Majority: 29.4%

Member of the New South Wales Legislative Assembly for Hawkesbury
- In office 24 March 2007 – 28 March 2015
- Preceded by: Steven Pringle
- Succeeded by: Dominic Perrottet

Personal details
- Born: Raymond Craig Williams; 27 September 1960 (age 66) Camperdown, New South Wales, Australia
- Party: Liberal Party
- Occupation: Maintenance manager

Raymond Craig Williams (born 27 September 1960) is an Australian politician who served as a member of the New South Wales Legislative Assembly representing the seat of Kellyville for the Liberal Party since 2023 until his resignation in 2026. He previously represented the electorates of Hawkesbury from 2007 to 2015 and Castle Hill from 2015 to 2023.

Williams has also been the New South Wales Minister for Multiculturalism and the Minister for Disability Services from January 2017 to March 2019 in the Berejiklian ministry.

== Early life and background ==
Williams is the son of Allen Williams, a former heavyweight boxing champion of Australia and the South Pacific and Margaret Williams, the daughter of English migrants from Cornwall. His family was involved in the training of horses, and Williams followed in the family footsteps and trained horses for more than 30 years. From 1985, he worked for Glenorie Bus Company at Dural.

Williams was a panel beater and maintenance manager with the Hillsbus company. He was a councillor on Baulkham Hills Shire Council until September 2008. He was a President of the Kellyville Rouse Hill Progress Association. Williams led a campaign of roadside protests to highlight the need for the upgrade of Windsor Road.

== Political career ==
In 2003, Williams contested the seat of Riverstone, and was unsuccessful. In an internal Liberal Party preselection for Hawkesbury prior to the 2007 state election, Williams defeated incumbent Steven Pringle. As a result, Pringle decided to run for the seat as an independent candidate. Williams won the seat in the 2007 state election with a 6.07% majority. In 2007, Williams was accused of branch stacking after a local pastor stated in a statutory declaration that Williams paid him party membership fees for churchgoers. This claim was denied by Williams, and has not been substantiated.

In 2008, Williams was ejected from state parliament by the Speaker Richard Torbay for pretending to wrestle a toy iguana, in reference to the Belinda Neal – John Della Bosca scandal known as Iguanagate.

Since his election to parliament, Williams has been appointed the Deputy Chair of the Liberal Party's Western Sydney Taskforce. In June 2010, Williams was appointed the Shadow Parliamentary Secretary for Western Sydney and replaced Wayne Merton who retired. At the 2011 state election, Williams reverted Hawkesbury to its traditional status as a comfortably safe Liberal seat, winning 84.7 per cent of the two-party vote on a swing of 28.7 points. He was one of several Liberal MPs who saw their margins blow out amid the Coalition's massive landslide of that year.

At the 2015 state election, Williams traded seats with Dominic Perrottet, the member for the equally safe seat of Castle Hill. Williams was preselected for Castle Hill while Perrottet was preselected for Hawkesbury, and both were easily re-elected–in Williams' case, with 79.4 percent of the two-party vote, making Castle Hill the safest seat in the state.

Following the resignation of Mike Baird as Premier, Gladys Berejiklian was elected as Liberal leader and sworn in as Premier. The First Berejiklian ministry was subsequently formed with Williams sworn in as the Minister for Multiculturalism and the Minister for Disability Services with effect from 30 January 2017. Following the 2019 state election where Williams retained the seat of Castle Hill, he was not reappointed to the Second Berejiklian ministry.

Due to electoral redistributions, Williams chose to contest the newly created electorate of Kellyville. He was elected to that seat, though suffered a 12.2% swing against him.

In October 2026, Williams announced his retirement to take effect at the 2027 New South Wales state election after having made a speech that sparked Operation Rosny, undertaken by the Independent Commission Against Corruption (ICAC).

== See also ==
- First Berejiklian ministry

New South Wales Legislative Assembly
Preceded by Steven Pringle	Member for Hawkesbury; 2007–2015	Succeeded by Dominic Perrottet
Preceded by Dominic Perrottet	Member for Castle Hill; 2015–2023	Succeeded by Mark Hodges
New seat	Member for Kellyville; 2023–2026	Incumbent
Political offices
Preceded by John Ajaka	Minister for Multiculturalism; 2017–2019	Succeeded by John Sidoti as Minister for Sport, Multiculturalism, Seniors and Veterans
Preceded by John Ajaka	Minister for Disability Services; 2017–2019	Succeeded by Gareth Ward as Minister for Families, Communities and Disability Services
