= William Piddington =

Australian politician

William Richman Piddington
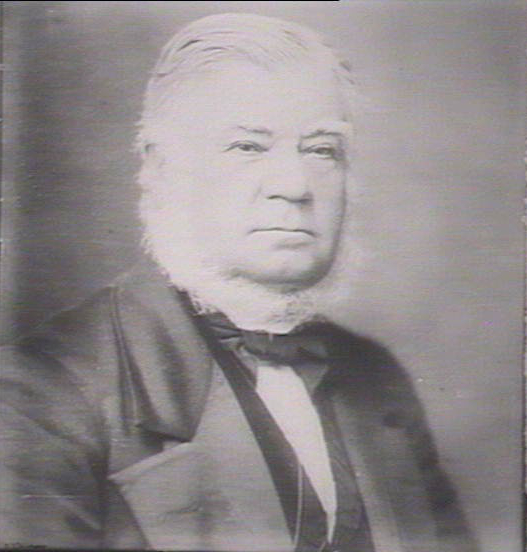

13th Colonial Treasurer of New South Wales
- In office 14 May 1872 – 4 December 1872
- Preceded by: George Lord
- Succeeded by: George Lloyd
- In office 22 March 1877 – 16 August 1877
- Preceded by: Alexander Stuart
- Succeeded by: William Long

Member of the New South Wales Legislative Council
- In office 28 October 1879 – 25 November 1887

Personal details
- Born: 8 March 1813 London
- Died: 25 November 1887 (aged 72) Sydney

William Richman Piddington (1815 – 25 November 1887) was an Australian bookseller and politician. He was a member of the New South Wales Legislative Assembly between 1856 and 1877 and a member of the New South Wales Legislative Council from 1879 until his death. He served two brief terms as the Colonial Treasurer of New South Wales in 1872 and 1877.

== Early life ==
Piddington was born in the parish of Newington St Mary, Surrey, England on 8 March 1813, to parents Bythima (née Richman) and William Weston Piddington. Being from a family of booksellers, William Richman Piddington was initially apprenticed to a bookshop in Bond Street, London. He emigrated to Sydney in 1838 and after farming for a short time on the Hunter River established a stationery and book shop at 332 George St, Sydney (replaced in 1906 by the Eastway Brothers' Building). Philosophically a radical, he became politically active during the 1840s and 1850s and opposed the conservative constitution proposed by William Wentworth. He was a member of the committee of the Anti-Transportation League and an alderman of the Sydney Municipal Council in 1851.

== Colonial Parliament ==
At the first election under the new constitution Piddington successfully contested the seats of Northumberland and Hunter. When this seat was abolished at the 1859 election he transferred to the seat of Hawkesbury which he represented until 1877. In 1879, he accepted a life appointment to the Legislative Council, where he was Chairman of Committees from March 1885 until his death.

== Government ==
Piddington was the Colonial Treasurer in the first ministry of Henry Parkes in May 1872 but resigned in December due to ill health. He was again colonial treasurer in the second Parkes ministry, losing his seat at the 1877 election. He supported the extension of the rural railway network and was a strong opponent of state aid for religious schools. In his later years his political opinions became more conservative and he opposed the granting of universal male suffrage. He was described by David Buchanan as "a little, squat, burly piece of pompous vulgarity" who "abandoned all his political opinions and turned Tory", however MacDonald notes "he supported such liberal measures as Parkes's 1866 Education Act, opposed state aid for public worship as 'contrary to the spirit of Christianity' and contributed to the rebuilding of St Mary's Cathedral."

New South Wales Legislative Assembly
New parliament	Member for Northumberland and Hunter; 1856 – 1859; With: Alexander Scott; Hovenden Hely / George White	district abolished
New district	Member for Hawkesbury; 1859 – 1877; With: Darvall / Cunneen / Moses	Succeeded by Alexander Bowman
Political offices
Preceded by George Lord	Colonial Treasurer; 1872	Succeeded by George Lloyd
Preceded by Alexander Stuart	Colonial Treasurer; 1877	Succeeded by William Long
New South Wales Legislative Council
Preceded by Joseph Docker	Chairman of Committees; 1887–1900	Succeeded by Archibald Jacob
