= Electoral district of Hawkesbury =

State electoral district of New South Wales, Australia

Hawkesbury New South Wales—Legislative Assembly
- Interactive map of district boundaries from the 2023 state election
- State: New South Wales
- Dates current: 1859–1920, 1927–present
- MP: Robyn Preston
- Party: Liberal
- Namesake: Hawkesbury River
- Electors: 61,167 (2023)
- Area: 3,171.18 km^{2} (1,224.4 sq mi)
- Demographic: Outer-metropolitan
Electorates around Hawkesbury:
Bathurst	Upper Hunter	Cessnock
Bathurst	Hawkesbury	Hornsby
Blue Mountains	Londonderry	Castle Hill

Hawkesbury is an electoral district of the Legislative Assembly in the Australian state of New South Wales. It has been represented by Robyn Preston of the Liberal Party since the 2019 election.

It includes all of the City of Hawkesbury and the far north of both The Hills Shire and Hornsby Shire.

== History ==
Hawkesbury was originally created in 1859, replacing part of Cumberland (North Riding) and named after the Hawkesbury River. It elected two members simultaneously from 1859 to 1880. It was abolished in 1920, with the introduction of proportional representation and absorbed into Cumberland. It was recreated in 1927.

Hawkesbury has been safely conservative for most of its existence. Labor held it for three terms after its 1941 victory. However, a redistribution ahead of the 1950 state election made it notionally Liberal, and it has remained in Liberal hands since.

At the Liberal Party landslide victory in 2011, Liberal candidate Ray Williams achieved 84.7% of the two-party preferred vote, with a primary vote share of 75.4%.

== Members for Hawkesbury ==
First incarnation (1859–1880, 2 members)
Member	Party	Term	Member	Party	Term
John Darvall	None	1859–1860	William Piddington	None	1859–1877
James Cunneen	None	1860–1869	William Piddington	None	1859–1877
Henry Moses	None	1869–1880	William Piddington	None	1859–1877
Henry Moses	None	1869–1880	Alexander Bowman	None	1877–1880

(1880–1920, 1 member)
Member	Party	Term
Alexander Bowman	None	1880–1882
Henry McQuade	None	1882–1885
Alexander Bowman	None	1885–1887
Alexander Bowman	Free Trade	1887–1892
Sydney Burdekin	Free Trade	1892–1894
William Morgan	Ind. Free Trade	1894–1895
William Morgan	Free Trade	1895–1901
Brinsley Hall	Progressive	1901–1907
Brinsley Hall	Liberal Reform	1907–1917
Bruce Walker Sr	Independent	1917–1920
Second incarnation (1927–present, 1 member)
Member	Party	Term
Bruce Walker Sr	Nationalist	1927–1932
Bruce Walker Jr	United Australia	1932–1941
Frank Finnan	Labor	1941–1950
Bernie Deane	Liberal	1950–1972
Kevin Rozzoli	Liberal	1973–2003
Steven Pringle	Liberal	2003–2006
Steven Pringle	Independent	2006–2007
Ray Williams	Liberal	2007–2015
Dominic Perrottet	Liberal	2015–2019
Robyn Preston	Liberal	2019–present

== Election results ==
2023 New South Wales state election: Hawkesbury
Party	Candidate	Votes	%	±%
Liberal	Robyn Preston	23,283	43.8	−6.8
Labor	Amanda Kotlash	13,532	25.4	+5.7
One Nation	Susane Popovski	5,476	10.3	+10.3
Greens	Danielle Wheeler	3,977	7.5	+1.2
Independent	Angela Maguire	2,275	4.3	+4.3
Small Business	Eddie Dogramaci	2,025	3.8	+3.8
Independent	Tony Pettitt	1,486	2.8	+2.8
Sustainable Australia	Elissa Carrey	1,125	2.1	−0.4
Total formal votes		53,179	95.7	−0.4
Informal votes		2,368	4.3	+0.4
Turnout		55,547	90.8	+1.7
Two-party-preferred result
Liberal	Robyn Preston	26,004	59.8	−6.7
Labor	Amanda Kotlash	17,460	40.2	+6.7
Liberal hold		Swing	−6.7	
