= Electoral results for the district of Hume =

Election results for Hume, New South Wales, Australia

Hume, an electoral district of the Legislative Assembly in the Australian state of New South Wales was created in 1894 and abolished in 1920.

Election	Member	Party		
1859	Morris Asher	None		
1860	Thomas Mate	None		
1864	Thomas Mate	None		
1869	James Fallon	None		
1872	James McLaurin	None		
1873 by	Thomas Robertson	None		
1874	George Day	None		
1877	George Day	None	Member	Party
1880	William Lyne	None	Leyser Levin	None
1885	William Lyne	None	James Hayes	None
1887	William Lyne	Protectionist	James Hayes	Protectionist
1889	William Lyne	Protectionist	James Hayes	Protectionist
1891	William Lyne	Protectionist	James Hayes	Protectionist
1894	William Lyne	Protectionist		
1895	William Lyne	Protectionist		
1898	William Lyne	Protectionist		
1899 by	William Lyne	Protectionist		
1901 by	Gordon McLaurin	Protectionist		
1901	Gordon McLaurin	Progressive		

== Election results ==
=== Elections in the 1900s ===
==== 1901 ====
1901 New South Wales state election: The Hume
Party	Candidate	Votes	%	±%
Progressive	Gordon McLaurin	unopposed		
Progressive hold				

Sir William Lyne (Progressive) resigned prior to the federal election in March 1901 at which he successfully contested the seat of Hume. Having resigned earlier than other candidates, a by-election was held in April 1901 in which Gordon McLaurin retained the seat for the Progressive Party.

==== 1901 by-election ====
1901 The Hume state by-election Wednesday 17 April
Party	Candidate	Votes	%	±%
Protectionist	Gordon McLaurin (elected)	745	46.7	−11.9
Independent	John McGrath	528	33.1	
Independent	John Miller	322	20.2	−21.2
Total formal votes		1,595	100.0	−
Informal votes		0	0.0	−
Turnout		1,595	66.4 (Note: based on a roll of 2,401 at the 1899 by-election.)	+20.8
Protectionist hold				

Sir William Lyne (Protectionist) resigned to successfully contest the federal seat of Hume.

=== Elections in the 1890s ===
==== 1899 by-election ====
1899 The Hume by-election Saturday 10 September
Party	Candidate	Votes	%	±%
Protectionist	William Lyne (re-elected)	642	58.6	−15.6
Independent	John Miller	453	41.4	
Total formal votes		1,095	100.0	+1.6
Informal votes		0	0.0	−1.6
Turnout		1,095	45.6	−1.6
Protectionist hold				

William Lyne was appointed Premier and Colonial Treasurer, forming the Lyne ministry.

==== 1898 ====
1898 New South Wales colonial election: The Hume
Party	Candidate	Votes	%	±%
National Federal	William Lyne	718	74.2	
Free Trade	William Wiesner	250	25.8	
Total formal votes		968	98.4	
Informal votes		16	1.6	
Turnout		984	47.2	
National Federal hold				

==== 1895 ====
1895 New South Wales colonial election: The Hume
Party	Candidate	Votes	%	±%
Protectionist	William Lyne	632	69.1	
Free Trade	Thomas Rhodes	283	30.9	
Total formal votes		915	99.4	
Informal votes		6	0.7	
Turnout		921	56.4	
Protectionist hold				

==== 1894 ====
1894 New South Wales colonial election: The Hume
Party	Candidate	Votes	%	±%
Protectionist	William Lyne	882	76.1	
Free Trade	Hugh Bridson	277	23.9	
Total formal votes		1,159	97.9	
Informal votes		25	2.1	
Turnout		1,184	71.2	
Protectionist win		(previously 2 members)		

==== 1891 ====
1891 New South Wales colonial election: The Hume Tuesday 30 June
Party	Candidate	Votes	%	±%
Protectionist	William Lyne (elected 1)	1,240	36.6	
Protectionist	James Hayes (elected 2)	1,175	34.7	
Free Trade	Walter Harper	448	13.2	
Protectionist	John O'Brien	428	12.6	
Protectionist	Sidney Lindeman	99	2.9	
Total formal votes		3,390	98.9	
Informal votes		39	1.1	
Turnout		1,889	59.1	
Protectionist hold 2				

=== Elections in the 1880s ===
==== 1889 ====
1889 New South Wales colonial election: The Hume Monday 28 January
Party	Candidate	Votes	%	±%
Protectionist	William Lyne (elected)	unopposed		
Protectionist	James Hayes (elected)	unopposed		
Protectionist hold 2				

==== 1887 ====
1887 New South Wales colonial election: The Hume Wednesday 9 February
Party	Candidate	Votes	%	±%
Protectionist	William Lyne (re-elected)	unopposed		
Protectionist	James Hayes (re-elected)	unopposed		

==== 1885 ====
1885 New South Wales colonial election: The Hume Friday 23 October
Candidate	Votes	%
William Lyne (re-elected 1)	1,080	42.2
James Hayes (elected 2)	720	28.2
Edmund Bond	451	17.6
John Gale	306	12.0
Total formal votes	2,557	99.2
Informal votes	20	0.8
Turnout	1,379	50.8

==== 1882 ====
1882 New South Wales colonial election: The Hume Wednesday 13 December
Candidate	Votes	%
William Lyne (re-elected)	unopposed	
Leyser Levin (re-elected)	unopposed	

==== 1880 ====
1880 New South Wales colonial election: The Hume Monday 29 November
Candidate	Votes	%
William Lyne (elected 1)	900	34.1
Leyser Levin (elected 2)	803	30.4
Philip Gell	641	24.3
Edmund Bond	295	11.2
Total formal votes	2,639	99.2
Informal votes	21	0.8
Turnout	1,705	57.8
	(1 new seat)	

The sitting member George Day successfully contested Albury

=== Elections in the 1870s ===
==== 1877 ====
1877 New South Wales colonial election: The Hume Monday 5 November
Candidate	Votes	%
George Day (re-elected)	461	97.7
Sir Henry Parkes	11	2.3
Total formal votes	472	100.0
Informal votes	0	0.0
Turnout	484	15.4

==== 1874 ====
1874–75 New South Wales colonial election: The Hume Tuesday 29 December 1874
Candidate	Votes	%
George Day (elected)	456	84.4
Thomas Robertson (defeated)	84	15.6
Total formal votes	540	97.5
Informal votes	14	2.5
Turnout	554	20.6

==== 1873 by-election ====
1873 The Hume by-election Wednesday 17 December
Candidate	Votes	%
Thomas Robertson (elected)	707	57.5
Morris Asher	523	42.5
Total formal votes	1,230	100.0
Informal votes	0	0.0
Turnout	1,230	50.1

James McLaurin resigned.

==== 1872 ====
1872 New South Wales colonial election: The Hume Friday 15 March
Candidate	Votes	%
James McLaurin (elected)	847	64.4
George Day	468	35.6
Total formal votes	1,315	97.6
Informal votes	32	2.4
Turnout	1,347	59.5

=== Elections in the 1860s ===
==== 1869 ====
1869–70 New South Wales colonial election: The Hume Thursday 23 December 1869
Candidate	Votes	%
James Fallon (elected)	513	57.8
Thomas Mate (defeated)	375	42.2
Total formal votes	888	97.7
Informal votes	21	2.3
Turnout	909	53.3

==== 1864 ====
1864–65 New South Wales colonial election: The Hume Saturday 24 December 1864
Candidate	Votes	%
Thomas Mate (re-elected)	243	44.8
Morris Asher	234	43.2
Walter Miller	65	12.0
Total formal votes	542	100.0
Informal votes	0	0.0
Turnout	542	47.5

==== 1860 ====
1860 New South Wales colonial election: The Hume Saturday 15 December
Candidate	Votes	%
Thomas Mate (elected)	300	63.2
Morris Asher (defeated)	175	36.8
Total formal votes	475	100.0
Informal votes	0	0.0
Turnout	475	39.6

=== Elections in the 1850s ===
==== 1859 ====
1859 New South Wales colonial election: The Hume Tuesday 28 June
Candidate	Votes	%
Morris Asher (elected)	175	41.4
Thomas Mate	172	40.7
J Badham	73	17.3
Eugene Owen	3	0.7
Total formal votes	423	100.0
Informal votes	0	0.0
Turnout	423	45.7
