= Results of the 1872 New South Wales colonial election =

Colonial election for New South Wales, Australia in 1872

New South Wales colonial election, 13 February 1872 – 28 March 1872 Legislative Assembly << 1869–70–1874–75 >>
Enrolled voters					
Votes cast	91,784		Turnout	48.44	−5.26
Informal votes	642		Informal	1.00	+0.59
Summary of votes by party
Party	Primary votes	%	Swing	Seats	Change
Total	91,784			72	

The 1872 New South Wales colonial election was for 72 members representing 60 electoral districts. The election was conducted on the basis of a simple majority or first-past-the-post voting system. In this election there were 8 multi-member districts returning 20 members and 52 single member districts. In the multi-member districts each elector could vote for as many candidates as there were vacancies. 12 districts were uncontested.

There were three districts that did not have a residential or property qualification, Goldfields North (1,500), Goldfields South (2,500) and Goldfields West (16,000). The average number of enrolled voters per seat in the other districts was 1,839 ranging from The Paterson (600) to The Lachlan (4,355). The electoral boundaries were established under the Electoral Act 1858 (NSW).

== Election results ==
=== Argyle ===
1872 New South Wales colonial election: Argyle Friday 8 March
Candidate	Votes	%
Edward Butler (re-elected)	unopposed	

=== Balranald ===
1872 New South Wales colonial election: Balranald Thursday 28 March
Candidate	Votes	%
Joseph Phelps (re-elected)	unopposed	

=== Bathurst ===
1872 New South Wales colonial election: Bathurst Friday 23 February
Candidate	Votes	%
Edward Combes (elected)	389	56.4
Henry Rotton	301	43.6
Total formal votes	690	98.3
Informal votes	12	1.7
Turnout	702	61.0

=== The Bogan ===
1872 New South Wales colonial election: The Bogan Monday 11 March
Candidate	Votes	%
George Lord (re-elected)	943	67.3
Jeremiah Rundle	381	27.2
Jean Serisier	78	5.6
Total formal votes	1,402	98.2
Informal votes	26	1.8
Turnout	1,428	42.0

=== Braidwood ===
1872 New South Wales colonial election: Braidwood Tuesday 5 March
Candidate	Votes	%
Edward Greville (re-elected)	1,017	67.3
George Alley	485	32.1
Archibald Condon	10	0.7
Total formal votes	1,512	96.0
Informal votes	63	4.0
Turnout	1,662	57.4

=== Camden ===
1872 New South Wales colonial election: Camden Monday 26 February
Candidate	Votes	%
Thomas Garrett (elected 1)	925	39.7
Arthur Onslow (re-elected 2)	741	31.8
Richard Roberts	664	28.5
Total formal votes	2,330	100.0
Informal votes	0	0.0
Turnout	1,608	62.9

=== Canterbury ===
1872 New South Wales colonial election: Canterbury Tuesday 20 February
Candidate	Votes	%
Richard Hill (re-elected 1)	1,715	38.7
John Lucas (re-elected 2)	1,442	32.5
Richard Wynne	1,147	25.9
William Henson	98	2.2
John Davis	30	0.7
Total formal votes	4,432	100.0
Informal votes	0	0.0
Turnout	2,806	54.7

=== Carcoar ===
1872 New South Wales colonial election: Carcoar Monday 26 February
Candidate	Votes	%
Thomas West (elected)	unopposed	

=== The Clarence ===
1872 New South Wales colonial election: The Clarence Tuesday 5 March
Candidate	Votes	%
Thomas Bawden (re-elected)	835	72.2
Edward Madgwick	322	27.8
Total formal votes	1,157	96.1
Informal votes	47	3.9
Turnout	1,203	31.0

=== Central Cumberland ===
1872 New South Wales colonial election: Central Cumberland Thursday 22 February
Candidate	Votes	%
John Lackey (re-elected 1)	762	42.2
John Hurley (b 1844) (elected 2)	573	31.7
Henry Zions	431	23.8
Frederick Birmingham	34	1.9
Total formal votes	8	100.0
Informal votes	1,808	0.0
Turnout	1,808	39.4

=== East Macquarie ===
1872 New South Wales colonial election: East Macquarie Thursday 22 February
Candidate	Votes	%
William Cummings (re-elected 1)	611	33.8
James Martin (elected 2)	495	27.4
Joseph Innes	424	23.5
John Smith (b 1811)	278	15.4
Total formal votes	1,808	100.0
Informal votes	0	0.0
Turnout	1,808	32.7

=== East Maitland ===
1872 New South Wales colonial election: East Maitland Saturday 24 February
Candidate	Votes	%
Stephen Scholey (elected)	316	52.8
Alexander Dodds (defeated)	278	46.4
Archibald Hamilton	5	0.8
Total formal votes	599	98.0
Informal votes	12	2.0
Turnout	611	67.9

=== East Sydney ===
1872 New South Wales colonial election: East Sydney Tuesday 13 February
Candidate	Votes	%
Henry Parkes (re-elected 1)	3,270	17.0
John Macintosh (elected 2)	3,068	16.0
Saul Samuel (re-elected 3)	3,048	15.9
James Neale (re-elected 4)	2,663	13.9
James Martin (defeated)	2,073	10.8
David Buchanan (defeated)	1,739	9.1
Bowie Wilson (defeated)	1,730	9.0
William Barker	1,379	7.2
George King (defeated)	240	1.3
Total formal votes	19,210	100.0
Informal votes	0	0.0
Turnout	5,598	49.8

=== Eden ===
1872 New South Wales colonial election: Eden Monday 26 February
Candidate	Votes	%
Henry Clarke (re-elected)	760	61.6
John D'Arcy	470	38.1
William Clements	4	0.3
Total formal votes	1,234	100.0
Informal votes	0	0.0
Turnout	1,262	67.0

=== The Glebe ===
1872 New South Wales colonial election: The Glebe Monday 19 February
Candidate	Votes	%
George Allen (re-elected)	890	53.6
Charles Mossman	742	44.7
David Buchanan	30	1.8
Total formal votes	1,662	96.5
Informal votes	60	3.5
Turnout	1,722	60.0

=== Goldfields North ===
1872 New South Wales colonial election: Goldfields North Monday 25 March
Candidate	Votes	%
James Rodd (elected)	252	51.0
Robert Forster (defeated)	213	43.1
Charles Carey	29	5.9
Total formal votes	494	100.0
Informal votes	0	0.0
Turnout	494	32.9

=== Goldfields South ===
1872 New South Wales colonial election: Goldfields South Monday 25 March
Candidate	Votes	%
Ezekiel Baker (re-elected)	441	80.8
William Bedall	105	19.2
Total formal votes	546	100.0
Informal votes	0	0.0
Turnout	553	22.1

=== Goldfields West ===
1872 New South Wales colonial election: Goldfields West Monday 25 March
Candidate	Votes	%
David Buchanan (elected)	1,727	45.4
James Plunkett	1,159	30.5
Walter Church (defeated)	710	18.7
Simon Belinfante	209	5.5
Total formal votes	3,805	97.1
Informal votes	114	2.9
Turnout	3,919	24.5

=== Goulburn ===
1872 New South Wales colonial election: Goulburn Tuesday 5 March
Candidate	Votes	%
William Teece (elected)	372	64.8
Maurice Alexander (defeated)	202	35.2
Total formal votes	574	100.0
Informal votes	0	0.0
Turnout	578	66.1

=== The Gwydir ===
1872 New South Wales colonial election: The Gwydir Thursday 21 March
Candidate	Votes	%
Thomas Dangar (re-elected)	213	29.9
Adolph Goldman	163	22.9
John Macansh	161	22.6
Alexander Bowman	103	14.5
David Jones	73	10.2
Total formal votes	713	97.3
Informal votes	20	2.7
Turnout	733	38.5

=== Hartley ===
1872 New South Wales colonial election: Hartley Wednesday 6 March
Candidate	Votes	%
Thomas Brown (elected)	434	47.8
Morris Asher	225	24.8
James Byrnes	187	20.6
John Garsed	47	5.2
E N Emmett	10	1.1
Joseph Johnson	4	0.4
John Ardill	1	0.1
Total formal votes	908	100.0
Informal votes	0	0.0
Turnout	933	45.0

=== The Hastings ===
1872 New South Wales colonial election: The Hastings Thursday 29 February
Candidate	Votes	%
Robert Smith (re-elected)	907	47.0
Eugene Fattorini	586	30.4
James Garvan	435	22.6
Total formal votes	1,928	100.0
Informal votes	0	0.0
Turnout	1,928	59.9

=== The Hawkesbury ===
1872 New South Wales colonial election: The Hawkesbury Thursday 7 March
Candidate	Votes	%
Henry Moses (re-elected 1)	591	43.0
William Piddington (re-elected 2)	522	38.0
Marshall Burdekin	262	19.1
Total formal votes	1,375	100.0
Informal votes	0	0.0
Turnout	1,375	46.4

=== The Hume ===
1872 New South Wales colonial election: The Hume Friday 15 March
Candidate	Votes	%
James McLaurin (elected)	847	64.4
George Day	468	35.6
Total formal votes	1,315	97.6
Informal votes	32	2.4
Turnout	1,347	59.5

=== The Hunter ===
1872 New South Wales colonial election: The Hunter Saturday 2 March
Candidate	Votes	%
John Burns (elected)	500	61.7
John Dillon (defeated)	311	38.4
Total formal votes	811	98.0
Informal votes	17	2.1
Turnout	828	64.5

=== Illawarra ===
1872 New South Wales colonial election: Illawarra Thursday 29 February
Candidate	Votes	%
William Forster (re-elected)	363	40.7
John Brown	328	36.8
Andrew Lysaght	201	22.5
Total formal votes	892	100.0
Informal votes	0	0.0
Turnout	892	65.3

=== Kiama ===
1872 New South Wales colonial election: Kiama Friday 23 February
Candidate	Votes	%
John Stewart (re-elected)	unopposed	

=== The Lachlan ===
1872 New South Wales colonial election: The Lachlan Saturday 9 March
Candidate	Votes	%
James Watson (re-elected)	1,177	73.4
T R Icely	427	26.6
Total formal votes	1,604	100.0
Informal votes	0	0.0
Turnout	1,604	36.8

=== Liverpool Plains ===
1872 New South Wales colonial election: Liverpool Plains Monday 11 March
Candidate	Votes	%
Hanley Bennett (elected)	532	45.1
Francis Rusden	207	17.5
William Gordon	152	12.9
Bowie Wilson	151	12.8
George Wallace	125	10.6
Alexander Bowman	13	1.1
Total formal votes	1,180	100.0
Informal votes	0	0.0
Turnout	1,230	43.1

=== The Lower Hunter ===
1872 New South Wales colonial election: The Lower Hunter Thursday 7 March
Candidate	Votes	%
Archibald Jacob (elected)	258	50.9
Robert Wisdom (defeated)	249	49.1
Total formal votes	507	100.0
Informal votes	0	0.0
Turnout	520	77.6

=== Monara ===
1872 New South Wales colonial election: Monara Friday 15 March
Candidate	Votes	%
William Grahame (elected)	738	70.4
Abram Moriarty	310	29.6
Total formal votes	1,048	100.0
Informal votes	0	0.0
Turnout	1,050	55.6

=== Morpeth ===
1872 New South Wales colonial election: Morpeth Tuesday 20 February
Candidate	Votes	%
James Campbell (re-elected)	309	66.7
John Keating	144	31.1
J D Nelson	10	2.2
Total formal votes	463	89.6
Informal votes	54	10.4
Turnout	517	65.2

=== Mudgee ===
1872 New South Wales colonial election: Mudgee Thursday 7 March
Candidate	Votes	%
Joseph Innes (elected)	833	59.8
Joseph O'Connor	559	40.2
Total formal votes	1,392	100.0
Informal votes	0	0.0
Turnout	1,392	50.9

=== The Murray ===
1872 New South Wales colonial election: The Murray Thursday 21 March
Candidate	Votes	%
Patrick Jennings (re-elected)	unopposed	

=== The Murrumbidgee ===
1872 New South Wales colonial election: The Murrumbidgee Tuesday 12 March
Candidate	Votes	%
William Macleay (re-elected)	unopposed	

=== Narellan ===
1872 New South Wales colonial election: Narellan Monday 4 March
Candidate	Votes	%
John Hurley (b 1796) (elected)	261	52.6
Joseph Leary (defeated)	231	46.6
William Walker	4	0.8
Total formal votes	496	100.0
Informal votes	0	0.0
Turnout	497	73.7

=== The Nepean ===
1872 New South Wales colonial election: The Nepean Wednesday 28 February
Candidate	Votes	%
Joseph Single (elected)	286	33.3
Henry Woods	236	27.5
James Rodd	172	20.1
James Ryan (defeated)	164	19.1
Total formal votes	858	100.0
Informal votes	0	0.0
Turnout	856	63.8

=== New England ===
1872 New South Wales colonial election: New England Friday 8 March
Candidate	Votes	%
Samuel Terry (re-elected)	1,098	84.3
William Windeyer	205	15.7
Total formal votes	1,303	98.6
Informal votes	19	1.4
Turnout	1,322	49.9

=== Newcastle ===
1872 New South Wales colonial election: Newcastle Saturday 2 March
Candidate	Votes	%
George Lloyd (elected)	610	51.8
Daniel Macquarie	567	48.2
Total formal votes	1,177	100.0
Informal votes	0	0.0
Turnout	1,177	73.4

=== Newtown ===
1872 New South Wales colonial election: Newtown Monday 4 March
Candidate	Votes	%
Stephen Brown (re-elected)	1,125	92.6
Edward Flood	81	6.7
Elias Bethel	9	0.7
Total formal votes	1,215	100.0
Informal votes	0	0.0
Turnout	1,215	46.6

=== Northumberland ===
1872 New South Wales colonial election: Northumberland Wednesday 21 February
Candidate	Votes	%
James Hannell (elected)	991	57.1
William Brookes (defeated)	387	22.3
Francis O'Brien	188	10.8
Thomas Adam	90	5.2
Henry Langley	68	3.9
James Pemell	13	0.8
Total formal votes	1,737	98.6
Informal votes	25	1.4
Turnout	1,762	65.5

=== Orange ===
1872 New South Wales colonial election: Orange Monday 4 March
Candidate	Votes	%
Harris Nelson (elected)	404	42.8
Andrew Kerr	403	42.7
Samuel Goold	136	14.4
Total formal votes	943	100.0
Informal votes	0	0.0
Turnout	964	59.8

=== Paddington ===
1872 New South Wales colonial election: Paddington Tuesday 20 February
Candidate	Votes	%
John Sutherland (re-elected)	unopposed	

=== Parramatta ===
1872 New South Wales colonial election: Parramatta Tuesday 20 February
Candidate	Votes	%
James Farnell (re-elected 1)	468	35.6
Hugh Taylor (elected 2)	451	34.4
James Byrnes (defeated)	394	30.0
Total formal votes	1,313	100.0
Informal votes	0	0.0
Turnout	746	52.3

=== The Paterson ===
1872 New South Wales colonial election: The Paterson Saturday 17 February
Candidate	Votes	%
William Arnold (re-elected)	144	96.0
George Townshend	6	4.0
Total formal votes	150	100.0
Informal votes	0	0.0
Turnout	150	25.0

=== Patrick's Plains ===
1872 New South Wales colonial election: Patrick's Plains Tuesday 27 February
Candidate	Votes	%
William Browne (elected)	535	61.9
Alexander Bowman	330	38.2
Total formal votes	865	97.6
Informal votes	21	2.4
Turnout	886	54.0

=== Queanbeyan ===
1872 New South Wales colonial election: Queanbeyan Wednesday 6 March
Candidate	Votes	%
Leopold William De Salis (elected)	305	37.6
Charles Walsh	289	35.6
William O'Neill	217	26.8
Total formal votes	811	100.0
Informal votes	0	0.0
Turnout	811	71.1

=== Shoalhaven ===
1872 New South Wales colonial election: Shoalhaven Tuesday 5 March
Candidate	Votes	%
James Warden (re-elected)	622	54.7
John Roseby	515	45.3
Total formal votes	1,137	97.8
Informal votes	26	2.2
Turnout	1,163	76.1

=== St Leonards ===
1872 New South Wales colonial election: St Leonards Wednesday 6 March
Candidate	Votes	%
William Tunks (re-elected)	686	65.8
James Byrnes	342	32.8
W Wardle	9	0.9
James French	5	0.5
Total formal votes	1,042	100.0
Informal votes	0	0.0
Turnout	1,044	49.8

=== Tenterfield ===
1872 New South Wales colonial election: Tenterfield Tuesday 12 March
Candidate	Votes	%
Robert Abbott (elected)	453	55.6
Colin Fraser (defeated)	362	44.4
Total formal votes	815	100.0
Informal votes	0	0.0
Turnout	827	47.6

=== The Tumut ===
1872 New South Wales colonial election: The Tumut Wednesday 21 February
Candidate	Votes	%
James Hoskins (re-elected)	564	67.5
Edward Brown (defeated)	272	32.5
Total formal votes	836	100.0
Informal votes	0	0.0
Turnout	836	51.6

=== The Upper Hunter ===
1872 New South Wales colonial election: The Upper Hunter Thursday 29 February
Candidate	Votes	%
John Creed (elected)	845	56.1
James White	661	43.9
Total formal votes	1,506	95.5
Informal votes	71	4.5
Turnout	1,577	57.8

=== Wellington ===
1872 New South Wales colonial election: Wellington Wednesday 28 February
Candidate	Votes	%
John Smith (elected)	164	34.6
George Stephen	149	31.4
Gerald Spring (defeated)	100	21.1
Andrew Ross	61	12.9
William Dalley	0	0.0
William Forlonge	0	0.0
Total formal votes	474	100.0
Informal votes	0	0.0
Turnout	591	37.8

=== West Macquarie ===
1872 New South Wales colonial election: West Macquarie Saturday 24 February
Candidate	Votes	%
Edmund Webb (re-elected)	320	78.6
George Thornton	87	21.4
Total formal votes	407	98.3
Informal votes	7	1.7
Turnout	414	40.2

=== West Maitland ===
1872 New South Wales colonial election: West Maitland Tuesday 5 March
Candidate	Votes	%
Benjamin Lee (re-elected)	504	58.3
Joseph Eckford	267	30.9
Archibald Hamilton	93	10.8
Total formal votes	864	98.2
Informal votes	16	1.8
Turnout	880	77.0

=== West Sydney ===
1872 New South Wales colonial election: West Sydney Thursday 15 February
Candidate	Votes	%
Joseph Wearne (re-elected 1)	2,997	20.7
John Booth (elected 2)	2,925	20.2
John Robertson (re-elected 3)	2,058	14.2
Joseph Raphael (elected 4)	1,966	13.6
George Lloyd (defeated)	1,789	12.4
William Windeyer (defeated)	1,512	10.4
Robert Campbell	717	5.0
Samuel Goold	371	2.6
Richard Dransfield	90	0.6
Henry Fisher	64	0.4
Total formal votes	14,489	100.0
Informal votes	0	0.0
Turnout	4,851	53.1

=== The Williams ===
1872 New South Wales colonial election: The Williams Friday 8 March
Candidate	Votes	%
John Nowlan (re-elected)	423	50.4
William Watson	416	49.6
Total formal votes	839	100.0
Informal votes	0	0.0
Turnout	839	64.1

=== Windsor ===
1872 New South Wales colonial election: Windsor Tuesday 20 February
Candidate	Votes	%
Richard Driver (re-elected)	241	50.7
William Walker	234	49.3
Total formal votes	475	100.0
Informal votes	0	0.0
Turnout	480	77.9

=== Wollombi ===
1872 New South Wales colonial election: Wollombi Wednesday 21 February
Candidate	Votes	%
James Cunneen (elected)	348	55.0
Joseph Eckford (defeated)	285	45.0
Total formal votes	633	100.0
Informal votes	0	0.0
Turnout	633	54.0

=== Yass Plains ===
1872 New South Wales colonial election: Yass Plains Friday 8 March
Candidate	Votes	%
Michael Fitzpatrick (re-elected)	unopposed	

== See also ==
- Candidates of the 1872 New South Wales colonial election
- Members of the New South Wales Legislative Assembly, 1872–1874
