= Candidates of the 1872 New South Wales colonial election =

This is a list of candidates for the 1872 New South Wales colonial election. The election was held from 13 February to 28 March 1872.

There was no recognisable party structure at this election.

== Retiring Members ==
- Archibald Bell MLA (Upper Hunter)
- Arthur Dight MLA (Windsor)
- James Fallon MLA (Hume)
- James Hart MLA (Monaro)
- Lewis Levy MLA (Liverpool Plains)
- John Morrice MLA (Camden)
- James Osborne MLA (Illawarra)
- William Speer MLA (West Sydney)
- John Suttor MLA (East Macquarie)
- William Suttor MLA (Bathurst)

== Legislative Assembly ==
Sitting members are shown in bold text. Successful candidates are highlighted.

Electorates are arranged chronologically from the day the poll was held. Because of the sequence of polling, some sitting members who were defeated in their constituencies were then able to contest other constituencies later in the polling period. On the second occasion, these members are shown in italic text.

Electorate	Successful candidates	Unsuccessful candidates
Tuesday 13 February 1872
East Sydney	John Macintosh; **James Neale**; **Henry Parkes**; **Saul Samuel**	William Barker; **David Buchanan**; **George King**; **James Martin**; **Bowie Wilson**
Thursday 15 February 1872
West Sydney	John Booth; Joseph Raphael; **John Robertson**; **Joseph Wearne**	Robert Campbell; Richard Dransfield; Henry Fisher; Samuel Goold; **George Lloyd**; **William Windeyer**
Saturday 17 February 1872
Paterson	**William Arnold**	George Townshend
Monday 19 February 1872
Glebe	**George Allen**	David Buchanan; Charles Mossman
Tuesday 20 February 1872
Canterbury	**Richard Hill**; **John Lucas**	John Davis; William Henson; Richard Wynne
Morpeth	**James Campbell**	John Keating; J D Nelson
Paddington	**John Sutherland**	
Parramatta	**James Farnell**; Hugh Taylor	**James Byrnes**
Windsor	**Richard Driver**	William Walker
Wednesday 21 February 1872
Northumberland	James Hannell	Thomas Adam; **William Brookes**; Henry Langley; Francis O'Brien; James Pemell
Tumut	**James Hoskins**	**Edward Brown**
Wollombi	James Cunneen	**Joseph Eckford**
Thursday 22 February 1872
Central Cumberland	John Hurley; **John Lackey**	Samuel Barber; Frederick Birmingham; Henry Zions
East Macquarie	**William Cummings**; James Martin	Joseph Innes; John Smith (b 1811)
Friday 23 February 1872
Bathurst	Edward Combes	Henry Rotton
Kiama	**John Stewart**	
Saturday 24 February 1872
East Maitland	Stephen Scholey	**Alexander Dodds**; Archibald Hamilton
West Macquarie	**Edmund Webb**	George Thornton
Monday 26 February 1872
Camden	Thomas Garrett; **Arthur Onslow**	Richard Roberts
Carcoar	Thomas West	
Eden	**Henry Clarke**	William Clements; John D'Arcy
Tuesday 27 February 1872
Patrick's Plains	William Browne	Alexander Bowman
Wednesday 28 February 1872
Nepean	Joseph Single	James Rodd; **James Ryan**; Henry Woods
Wellington	John Samuel Smith	William Dalley; William Forlonge; Andrew Ross; **Gerald Spring**; George Stephen
Thursday 29 February 1872
Hastings	**Robert Smith**	Eugene Fattorini; James Garvan
Illawarra	**William Forster**	John Brown; Andrew Lysaght
Upper Hunter	John Creed	James White
Saturday 2 March 1872
Hunter	John Burns	**John Dillon**
Newcastle	George Lloyd	Daniel Macquarie
Monday 4 March 1872
Narellan	John Hurley	**Joseph Leary**; William Walker
Newtown	**Stephen Brown**	Elias Bethel; **Edward Flood**
Orange	Harris Nelson	Samuel Goold; Andrew Kerr
Tuesday 5 March 1872
Braidwood	**Edward Greville**	George Alley; Archibald Condon
Clarence	**Thomas Bawden**	Edward Madgwick
Goulburn	William Teece	**Maurice Alexander**
Shoalhaven	**James Warden**	John Roseby
West Maitland	**Benjamin Lee**	Joseph Eckford; Archibald Hamilton
Wednesday 6 March 1872
Hartley	Thomas Brown	John Ardill; Morris Asher; James Byrnes; E N Emmett; John Garsed; Joseph Johnson
Queanbeyan	Leopold De Salis	William O'Neill; Charles Walsh
St Leonards	**William Tunks**	James Byrnes; James French; W H Wardle
Thursday 7 March 1872
Hawkesbury	**Henry Moses**; **William Piddington**	Marshall Burdekin
Lower Hunter	Archibald Jacob	**Robert Wisdom**
Mudgee	Joseph Innes	Joseph O'Connor
Friday 8 March 1872
Argyle	**Edward Butler**	
New England	**Samuel Terry**	William Windeyer
Williams	**John Nowlan**	William Watson
Yass Plains	**Michael Fitzpatrick**	
Saturday 9 March 1872
Lachlan	**James Watson**	T R Icely
Monday 11 March 1872
Bogan	**George Lord**	Jeremiah Rundle; Jean Serisier
Liverpool Plains	Hanley Bennett	Alexander Bowman; William Gordon; Francis Rusden; George Wallace; Bowie Wilson
Tuesday 12 March 1872
Murrumbidgee	**William Macleay**	
Tenterfield	Robert Abbott	**Colin Fraser**
Friday 15 March 1872
Hume	James McLaurin	George Day
Monaro	William Grahame	Abram Moriarty
Thursday 21 March 1872
Gwydir	**Thomas Dangar**	Alexander Bowman; Adolph Goldman; David Jones; John Macansh
Murray	**Patrick Jennings**	
Monday 25 March 1872
Goldfields North	James Rodd	Charles Carey; **Robert Forster**
Goldfields South	**Ezekiel Baker**	William Bedall
Goldfields West	David Buchanan	Simon Belinfante; **Walter Church**; James Plunkett
Thursday 28 March 1872
Balranald	**Joseph Phelps**	

== See also ==
- Members of the New South Wales Legislative Assembly, 1872–1874
