= Members of the New South Wales Legislative Assembly, 1872–1874 =

Members of the New South Wales Legislative Assembly who served in the seventh parliament of New South Wales held their seats from 1872 to 1874. The 182 election was held between 13 February and 28 March 1872 with parliament first meeting on 30 April 1872. There were 72 members elected for 52 single member electorates, 6 two member electorates and 2 four member electorates. The maximum term of this parliament was 3 years. However the assembly was dissolved after 32 months. Henry Parkes was the premier for the duration of the parliament. The Speaker was William Arnold.

Name	Electorate	Years in office
Robert Abbott	Tenterfield	1872–1877, 1880–1882
George Allen	Glebe	1869–1883
William Arnold	Paterson	1856–1875
Ezekial Baker	Goldfields South	1870–1877, 1879–1881, 1884–1887
Thomas Bawden	Clarence	1869–1880
Hanley Bennett	Liverpool Plains	1872–1880
John Booth	West Sydney	1872–1877
Stephen Brown	Newtown	1864–1881
Thomas Brown	Hartley	1872–1876
William Browne	Patrick's Plains	1872–1880
David Buchanan	Goldfields West	1860–1862, 1864–1867, 1869–1877, 1879–1885, 1888–1889
John Burns	Hunter	1861–1869, 1872–1891
Edward Butler	Argyle	1869–1877
James Campbell	Morpeth	1864–1874
Henry Clarke	Eden	1869–1894, 1895–1904
Edward Combes	Bathurst	1872–1885
Walter Cooper (Note: East Macquarie MLA Sir James Martin resigned in November 1873 on being appointed Chief Justice of New South Wales. The resulting by-election was won by Walter Cooper on 1 December 1873.)	East Macquarie	1873–1874
John Creed	Upper Hunter	1872–1874
William Cummings	East Macquarie	1859–1874
James Cunneen	Wollombi	1860–1869, 1872–1877
Thomas Dangar	Gwydir	1865–1885, 1887–1890
Leopold William De Salis	Queanbeyan	1872–1874
Richard Driver	Windsor	1860–1880
James Farnell	Parramatta	1860–1860, 1864–1885, 1887–1888
Michael Fitzpatrick	Yass Plains	1869–1881
William Forster	Illawarra	1856–1860, 1861–1864, 1864–1869, 1869–1874, 1875–1876, 1880–1882
Thomas Garrett	Camden	1860–1871, 1872–1891
William Grahame	Monaro	1865–1869, 1872–1874
Edward Greville	Braidwood	1870–1880
James Hannell	Northumberland	1860–1869, 1872–1874
William Hay (Note: Murray MLA Patrick Jennings resigned in July 1872. The resulting by-election on 5 August 1872 was won by William Hay.)	Murray	1872–1877, 1880–1882
Richard Hill	Canterbury	1868–1877
James Hoskins	Tumut	1859–1863, 1868–1882
John Hurley (b.1796)	Narellan	1859–1860, 1864–1869, 1872–1880
John Hurley (b.1844)	Central Cumberland	1872–1874, 1876–1880, 1887–1891, 1901–1907
Joseph Innes (Note: Mudgee MLA Joseph Innes was elevated to the Legislative Council in August 1873. The resulting by-election was won by Joseph O'Connor on 8 September 1873.)	Mudgee	1872–1873
Archibald Jacob	Lower Hunter	1872–1882
Patrick Jennings	Murray	1869–1872, 1880–1887
John Lackey	Central Cumberland	1860–1864, 1867–1880
Benjamin Lee (Note: West Maitland MLA Benjamin Lee resigned due to financial difficulties. The resulting by-election on 4 August 1874 was won by Lewis Levy.)	West Maitland	1864–1874
Lewis Levy	West Maitland	1871–1872, 1874–1874
George Lloyd	Newcastle	1869–1877, 1880–1882, 1885–1887
George Lord	Bogan	1856–1877
John Lucas	Canterbury	1860–1869, 1871–1880
John Macintosh	East Sydney	1872–1880
William Macleay	Murrumbidgee	1856–1874
Sir James Martin	East Macquarie	1856, 1857–1860, 1862–1873
James McLaurin (Note: Hume MLA James McLaurin resigned from parliament in March 1873. The resulting by-election was won by Thomas Robertson on 31 March 1873.)	Hume	1872–1873
Charles Moore (Note: East Sydney MLA James Neale resigned in June 1874. The resulting by-election of 15 July 1874 was won by Charles Moore.)	East Sydney	1874
Henry Moses	Hawkesbury	1869–1880, 1882–1885
James Neale	East Sydney	1864–1874
Harris Nelson	Orange	1872–1877
John Nowlan	Williams	1866–1874
Joseph O'Connor	Mudgee	1873–1874
George Oakes (Note: East Sydney MLA Saul Samuel was elevated to the Legislative Council in June 1872. The resulting by-election was won by George Oakes on 12 June 1872.)	East Sydney	1856–1860, 1872–1874
Arthur Onslow	Camden	1869–1880
Henry Parkes	East Sydney	1856, 1858, 1859–1861, 1864–1870, 1872–1895
Joseph Phelps	Balranald	1864–1877
William Piddington	Hawkesbury	1856–1877
Joseph Raphael	West Sydney	1872–1874
John Robertson	West Sydney	1856–1861, 1862–1865, 1865–1866, 1866–1870, 1870–1877, 1877–1878, 1882–1886
Thomas Robertson	Hume	1873–1874
James Rodd	Goldfields North	1865–1869, 1872–1874
Saul Samuel	East Sydney	1859–1860, 1862–1872
Stephen Scholey	East Maitland	1872–1878
Joseph Single	Nepean	1872–1874
John Smith	Wellington	1872–1877
Robert Smith	Hastings	1870–1889
John Stewart	Kiama	1866–1869, 1871–1874
John Sutherland	Paddington	1860–1881, 1882–1889
Hugh Taylor (Note: Parramatta MLA Hugh Taylor resigned as he had received conflicting legal advice as to whether his contract to supply articles to a destitute institution disqualified him from office. He was elected unopposed at the resulting by-election on 22 May 1872.)	Parramatta	1872–1880, 1882–1894
William Teece	Goulburn	1872–1880
Samuel Terry	New England	1859–1869, 1871–1881
William Tunks	St Leonards	1864–1874
James Warden	Shoalhaven	1871–1877
James Watson	Lachlan	1869–1882, 1884–1885
Joseph Wearne	West Sydney	1869–1875
Edmund Webb	West Macquarie	1869–1874, 1878–1881
Thomas West	Carcoar	1872–1874

== See also ==
- First Parkes ministry
- Results of the 1872 New South Wales colonial election
- Candidates of the 1872 New South Wales colonial election

== Notes ==
There was no party system in New South Wales politics until 1887. Under the constitution, ministers were required to resign to recontest their seats in a by-election when appointed. These by-elections are only noted when the minister was defeated; in general, he was elected unopposed.
