= 1873 Hume colonial by-election =

By-election in New South Wales, Australia

A by-election was held for the New South Wales Legislative Assembly electorate of The Hume on 31 March 1873 because James McLaurin resigned due to ill health.

== Dates ==
Date	Event
9 December 1873	James McLaurin resigned
28 February 1873	Writ of election issued by the Speaker of the Legislative Assembly.
17 March 1873	Nominations at Albury.
31 March 1873	Polling day
21 April 1873	Return of writ

== Candidates ==
- Morris Asher was a businessman from Albury who had been elected member for the Hume at the first election for the district in 1859 but was defeated in 1860 and 1864.
- Thomas Robertson was a solicitor and pastoralist, a long time alderman of the Municipality of Deniliquin and former Mayor of Deniliquin. This was the first time he stood for the Legislative Assembly.

== Result ==
1873 The Hume by-election Wednesday 17 December
Candidate	Votes	%
Thomas Robertson (elected)	707	57.5
Morris Asher	523	42.5
Total formal votes	1,230	100.0
Informal votes	0	0.0
Turnout	1,230	50.1

== See also ==
- Electoral results for the district of Hume
- List of New South Wales state by-elections
