= 1901 Hume state by-election =

Election result for Hume, New South Wales, Australia

A by-election for the seat of Hume in the New South Wales Legislative Assembly was held on 17 April 1901 because of the resignation of Sir William Lyne (Protectionist) to successfully contest the federal seat of Hume.

== Dates ==
Date	Event
20 March 1901	Sir William Lyne resigned.
25 March 1901	Writ of election issued by the Speaker of the Legislative Assembly.
4 April 1901	Day of nomination
17 April 1901	Polling day
30 April 1901	Return of writ

== Result ==
1901 The Hume state by-election Wednesday 17 April
Party	Candidate	Votes	%	±%
Protectionist	Gordon McLaurin (elected)	745	46.7	−11.9
Independent	John McGrath	528	33.1	
Independent	John Miller	322	20.2	−21.2
Total formal votes		1,595	100.0	−
Informal votes		0	0.0	−
Turnout		1,595	66.4 (Note: based on a roll of 2,401 at the 1899 by-election.)	+20.8
Protectionist hold				

== See also ==
- Electoral results for the district of Hume
- List of New South Wales state by-elections
