= Macansh =

Macansh is a surname. Notable people with the surname include:

- Alexander Macansh (1803–1866), Scottish poet
- John Macansh (1820–1896), Australian politician
