= James Fallon =

James or Jim Fallon may refer to:

- James Fallon (politician) (1823–1886), Australian politician, vigneron, and wine merchant
- James H. Fallon (1947–2023), American neuroscientist
- Jim Fallon (footballer) (born 1950), Scottish association football player and manager
- Jim Fallon (rugby) (born 1965), English rugby union and rugby league footballer
- Jimmy Fallon (born 1974), American comedian and talk show host
- Jim Fallon, character in the 1952 film The Big Trees, played by Kirk Douglas

== See also ==
- James Fallon High School, Albury, New South Wales, Australia
