= 1899 Hume colonial by-election =

Election result for Hume, New South Wales, Australia

A by-election was held for the New South Wales Legislative Assembly electorate of The Hume on 10 September 1899 because William Lyne had been appointed Premier and Colonial Treasurer, forming the Lyne ministry. Until 1904, members appointed to a ministerial position were required to face a by-election. These were generally uncontested. Of the nine ministers appointed in the Lyne ministry, The Hume and Ashfield (Bernhard Wise) were the only electorates in which the by-election was contested.

== Dates ==
Date	Event
15 September 1899	William Lyne appointed Colonial Treasurer.
16 September 1899	Writ of election issued by the Speaker of the Legislative Assembly.
23 September 1899	Nominations
30 September 1899	Polling day
9 October 1899	Return of writ

== Result ==
1899 The Hume by-election Saturday 10 September
Party	Candidate	Votes	%	±%
Protectionist	William Lyne (re-elected)	642	58.6	−15.6
Independent	John Miller	453	41.4	
Total formal votes		1,095	100.0	+1.6
Informal votes		0	0.0	−1.6
Turnout		1,095	45.6	−1.6
Protectionist hold				

== See also ==
- Electoral results for the district of Hume
