= Lyne ministry =

New South Wales government ministry led by William Lyne

- 29th Cabinet of the Colony of New South Wales

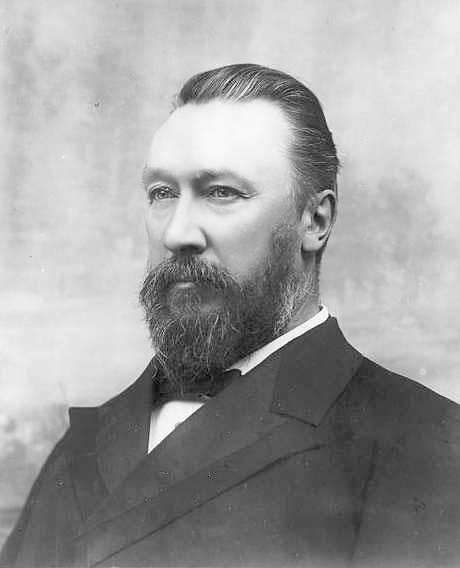
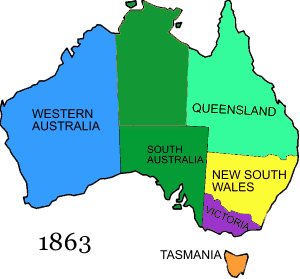
- Premier Sir William Lyne and the Colony of New South Wales (1863–1900)
- Date formed: 14 September 1899
- Date dissolved: 27 March 1901

People and organisations
- Monarch: Queen Victoria
- Governor: The Earl Beauchamp
- Premier: Sir William Lyne
- No. of ministers: 10
- Member party: Protectionist Party
- Status in legislature: Majority government
- Opposition party: Liberal and Reform Association
- Opposition leader: Joseph Carruthers

History
- Predecessor: Reid ministry
- Successor: See ministry

The Lyne ministry was the 29th ministry of the Colony of New South Wales, and was led by the 13th Premier, Sir William Lyne, KCMG. (Note: In 1900, Lyne was appointed a Knight Commander of the Order of St Michael and St George whilst in office.)

Lyne was elected to the New South Wales Legislative Assembly in 1880 as member for Hume, serving in the Jennings and Dibbs ministries. He succeeded Sir George Dibbs as leader of the Protectionist Party and Leader of the Opposition in August 1895. The party performed well at the election in July 1898, gaining 10 seats. The Reid government survived with the support of Labour. Lyne resigned as leader in October 1898, nominating Edmund Barton to replace him in recognition that Barton was acknowledged as the leader of the federal movement. In August 1899, Reid was losing support however Labour, who had held the balance of power since 1898, would not support Barton as Premier. Barton resigned as leader and was replaced by Lyne. Labour withdrew its support for Reid and Lyne became Premier on 14 September 1899.

Under the constitution, ministers in the Legislative Assembly were required to resign to recontest their seats in an election when appointed. Such ministerial by-elections were usually uncontested and on this occasion a by-election was only required in The Hume (Sir William Lyne) and Ashfield (Bernhard Wise) and both were re-elected. The other ministers were re-elected unopposed.

Lyne resigned in March 1901 to successfully contest the federal Division of Hume. He was succeeded by his Protectionist Party colleague, John See.

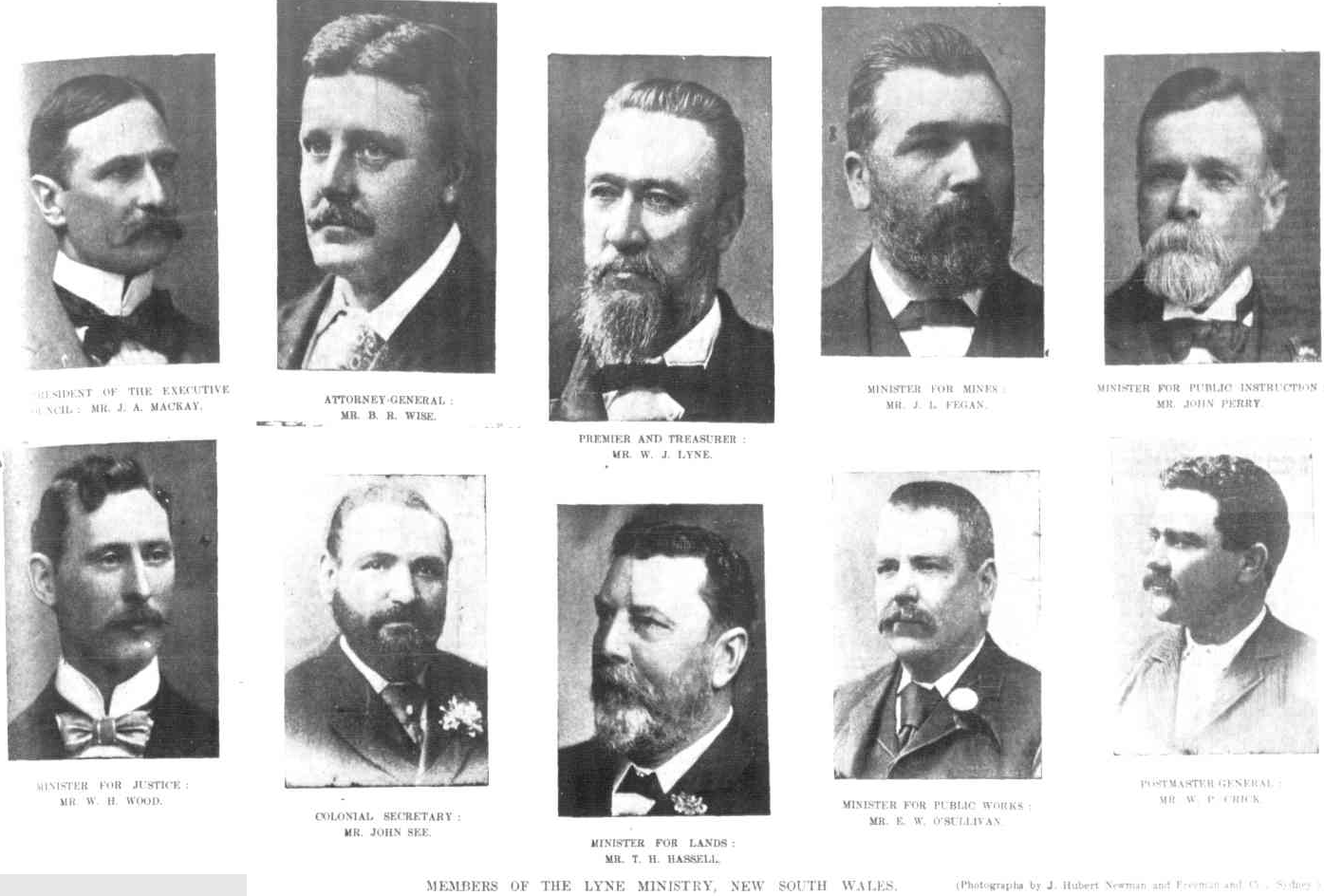
The Lyne ministry

== Composition of ministry ==
The composition of the ministry was announced by Premier Lyne on 14 September 1899 and covers the period up to 27 March 1901; although some ministers retained portfolio responsibilities until the See ministry was sworn in. Ministers are listed in order of seniority.

Portfolio	Minister	Party	Term start	Term end	Term length
Premier	Sir William Lyne	Protectionist	14 September 1899	27 March 1901	1 year, 194 days
Vice-President of the Executive Council	Sir William Lyne	Protectionist	14 September 1899	15 September 1899	1 day
Colonial Treasurer; Collector of Internal Revenue	Sir William Lyne	Protectionist	15 September 1899	20 March 1901	1 year, 186 days
Colonial Secretary; Registrar of Records	John See	Protectionist	14 September 1899	27 March 1901	1 year, 194 days
Attorney General	Bernhard Wise QC, MLA / MLC	Protectionist	14 September 1899	27 March 1901	1 year, 194 days
Secretary for Lands	Thomas Hassall	Protectionist	14 September 1899	9 April 1901	1 year, 207 days
Secretary for Public Works	Edward O'Sullivan	Protectionist	14 September 1899	27 March 1901	1 year, 194 days
Minister of Justice	William Wood	Protectionist	14 September 1899	9 April 1901	1 year, 207 days
Minister of Public Instruction; Minister for Labour and Industry	John Perry	Protectionist	14 September 1899	27 March 1901	1 year, 194 days
Secretary for Mines and Agriculture	John Fegan	Protectionist	15 September 1899	8 April 1901	1 year, 205 days
Postmaster-General	Paddy Crick	Protectionist	14 September 1899	28 February 1901	1 year, 167 days
Minister without portfolio	Paddy Crick	Protectionist	1 March 1901	10 April 1901	40 days
Vice-President of the Executive Council; Representative of the Government in Legislative Council	Kenneth Mackay MLC	Protectionist	15 September 1899	24 April 1900	221 days
Vice-President of the Executive Council; Representative of the Government in Legislative Council	Francis Suttor MLC	Protectionist	12 June 1900	27 March 1901	288 days

Ministers were members of the Legislative Assembly unless otherwise noted.

== See also ==
  - Members of Legislative Assembly
  - (1891-1901)
  - Members of Legislative Council
  - (1898–1901)

== Notes ==
Preceded by Reid ministry	Lyne ministry 1899–1901	Succeeded by See ministry
