= Leyser Levin =

Prussian-born Australian politician

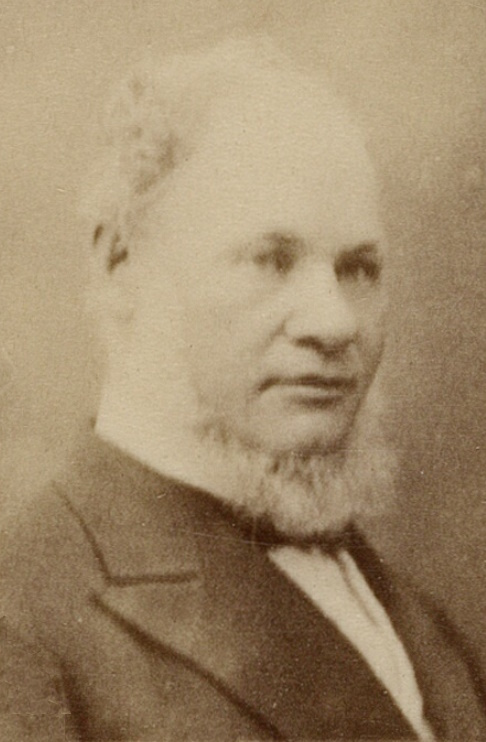

Member for Hume (NSW Legislative Assembly)
- In office 25 November 1880 – 7 October 1885

Personal details
- Born: 23 April 1829 Germany (Prussia)
- Died: 26 January 1908 (aged 78) St Kilda, Melbourne, Victoria

Leyser Levin (23 April 1829 – 26 January 1908) was a Prussian-born Australian businessman and politician.

Levin emigrated to Melbourne with his family in 1855. In the early 1860s he established a storekeeping business at the newly-formed township of Rutherglen. In 1866 he purchased a store at nearby Wahgunyah on the Murray River and by the early 1870s he had established his business at Corowa, opposite Wahgunyah on the New South Wales side of the river. For over forty years Levin was a prominent local businessman and active in the progress of the district on both sides of the border, including a period as a local member in the New South Wales parliament from 1880 to 1885.

== Biography ==
=== Early years ===
Leyser Levin was born on 23 April 1829 in Germany, probably in Prussia (now a part of Poland).

In 1852, as a young man, Levin emigrated to London from Bromberg in Prussia. His immigration record lists his occupation as a merchant.

Leyser Levin and Johanna Schnog were married on 22 March 1854 at the New Synagogue in Liverpool, England. The first two of their seven children were born in England.

=== Melbourne ===
Levin and his family emigrated to Australia, arriving in Melbourne on 25 June 1855 aboard the clipper ship Champion of the Seas.

Levin formed a partnership with Bernard King operating a business as tobacconists at 202 Bourke Street in Melbourne. The partnership was dissolved "by mutual consent" in November 1856.

=== Rutherglen ===
In late 1860 or 1861 Levin "was induced to go to Rutherglen", north-east of Melbourne near the Murray River, at that time a new township formed as a result of a gold rush. He arrived at a time when Rutherglen "was a canvas town". Levin commenced business in Drummond Street. The centre of the township was later relocated from the low swampy ground of Drummond Street to a more easterly location in High Street where "Mr. Levin's name was prominent among the names of the various business places". Levin's store at Rutherglen was known as Manchester House, selling clothing and drapery. In October 1865 Levin held a "clearing-out sale", announcing his intention to leave the district.

=== Wahgunyah and Corowa ===
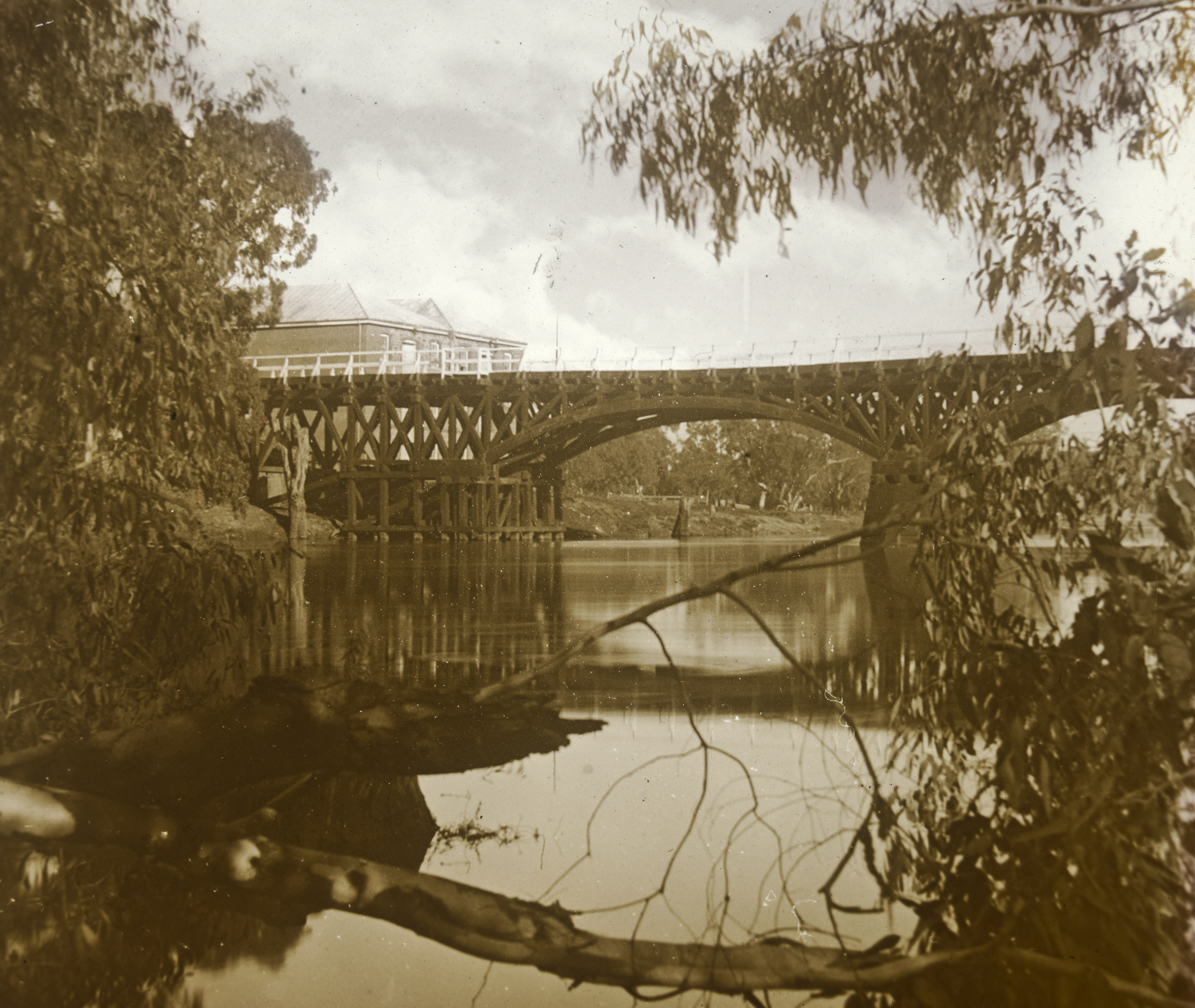
The first bridge between Wahgunyah and Corowa, spanning the Murray River.

In July 1866 Levin purchased a store at Wahgunyah formerly conducted by Main and Baldock. Although Levin was then living at Rutherglen, he had been a frequent visitor to nearby Wahgunyah, on the southern bank of the Murray River. The article reporting the change commented: "the straightforward and business-like way he has carried out his engagements will ensure for him here increased patronage".

Levin later turned his attention to Corowa, opposite Wahgunyah on the New South Wales side of the Murray River. Wahgunya and Corowa were accessible to each other by a privately-built toll-bridge completed in 1862. In 1868 Levin erected a brick store at Corowa, the first such building in the township. The "handsome and substantial store" was completed in September 1868, a building described as one that "certainly reflects great credit to owner and builders" and which will "compare favorably with any in Melbourne or Sydney".

In May 1869 Levin's store in Wahgunyah caught alight in the middle of the night. By the time it was discovered "the fire was so far advanced that any attempts to save anything in the store were perfectly futile, owing to the inflammable nature of its contents – the shelves being made of pine, and the roof of shingles". Efforts were directed towards successfully saving Levin's adjoining dwelling house as well as the Court House.

In 1872 Corowa had a population of about three hundred, with six hotels, four stores and a court-house and lockup. Levin's large store facing the main street was described as "a wholesale and retail grocery and drapery establishment", with an adjoining private residence of the owner and his family. At the rear of the store, on the bank of the Murray River, stood the Corowa steam flour mill owned and built by Levin, construction of which was completed in early 1872. The mill was a brick building, four storeys high, housing a twenty horse-power steam engine working three pairs of grinding stones. The steam flour mill at Corowa enabled Levin to develop a flourishing trade supplying flour to Riverina townships such as Swan Hill, Deniliquin, Balranald and Hay, much of it being conveyed by river steamers.

At Corowa Levin constructed the premises which was later leased and occupied by the Bank of New South Wales, "the bank then not having sufficient confidence in Corowa to build for themselves". He was active in local matters, being one of the founders of the Corowa Agricultural Society and the School of Arts. In the early 1870s Levin purchased a fifty-eight acre paddock near Corowa's main street. He later subdivided the land and donated several lots to the government for a post office and a public school. Although Levin made the offer of a two-acre lot for a government school as early as October 1875, it was only in 1878 that plans and specifications were prepared and tenders called for the construction of a public school at Corowa.

In 1874 Levin purchased the 'Goombargona' and 'Oil Tree' pastoral stations, which he kept "for a couple of years" before they were sold to John G. Gray.

In July 1876 Levin left Australia to travel to the Centennial Exhibition in Philadelphia, leaving his wife and family to carry on the storekeeping and milling business in Corowa during his absence". On the eve of his departure a farewell banquet was held for him at the Royal Hotel in Corowa.

In May 1879 Levin became the fourth partner of a partnership previously made up of Abraham Goldberg, Herman Goldberg and Lipman Levinsohn, in business as clothing manufacturers and warehousemen trading in Melbourne and Sydney under the new name of Levin, Goldberg Bros. and Co. At about the same time Levin admitted his sons Henry and Jacob as partners in his business at Corowa, as general storekeepers and wine and spirit merchants (trading as L. Levin and Sons). Levin's sole trader business, as a miller and produce merchant at Corowa, continued unchanged. Levin later claimed to have withdrawn in July 1880 as a partner from Levin, Goldberg Bros. and Co., but by that stage he had contributed about nine thousand pounds to the partnership and had received no repayments. At the request of the manager of the Bank of New South Wales Levin's withdrawal from the partnership was not made public. The debt owed to him was reduced to five thousand pounds after Levin took goods in lieu of money.

=== Political career ===
In 1880 Levin decided to contest the New South Wales elections for the Hume electorate. Under the Electoral Act of 1880 the Hume electorate was changed from a single member to a two-member electorate. Four candidates were nominated for the electorate. At the election held in November 1880 Levin was elected as one of the two members to represent the Hume electorate in the New South Wales Legislative Assembly, together with William J. Lyne. Levin polled behind Lyne with 803 votes (or 30.4 percent).

In 1882 Levin acted as an intermediary in the negotiations between the governments of Victoria and New South Wales, resulting in the purchase of the bridge between Wahgunyah and Corowa. The bridge was opened for public use, free of tolls and charges, an event celebrated on 7 July 1882 with a sports day and fireworks.

The Melbourne firm of Levin, Goldberg Bros. and Co. was experiencing financial difficulties and in early July 1882 they held a meeting of creditors to request time to pay their debts. Levin attended the meeting both as a partner and a creditor. In early December 1882 Levin's estate was voluntarily sequestrated upon his own petition, claiming the cause of his insolvency was "having allowed my name to appear as a partner in the firm Levin, Goldberg Brothers, and Company, of Melbourne... of which I ceased to be a member in the month of July, 1880; and being pressed by creditors of that firm, which has sequestrated its estate".

At the general election held in December 1882 both Levin and Lyne were re-elected unopposed to represent the Hume electorate in the New South Wales Legislative Assembly.

In February 1883 a special meeting was held at Corowa in regard to Levin's insolvent estate.

During the period he was a member for the Hume, Levin and his colleague William Lyne were active in pushing for improvements in the electorate, such as direct telegraphic communication between Albury and Deniliquin and the raising of the road above flood level between Corowa and the bridge over the Murray.

In about 1883 Levin purchased land near Wahgunyah on which he later had planted seventy acres of grape-vines for the production of wine.

In November 1883 a certificate discharging his debts (applicable to the colony of Victoria) was granted to Leyser Levin in regard to his previous partnership of "Levin, Goldberg Bros., and Co., wholesale clothiers". In about March 1884 Levin applied for a certificate of conformity to discharge his insolvency in the colony of New South Wales.

=== Last years ===
After his retirement from politics in October 1885 Levin devoted his time to viticulture on his 'Lake Vineyard' property on Lake Moodemere, a large billabong south of Wahgunyah and west of Rutherglen. A description of his vineyard published in 1887 detailed the wine grape varieties grown there: Pedro, Shiraz, Reisling, Madeira and Brown Muscatel. He also grew the table grape varieties Black Hamburg, Black Prince and Muscat Alexandra. On a farm adjoining his vineyard Levin cultivated twenty-five acres of land, from which in 1886 he produced seventy bags of wheat, thirty bags of oats and about fifteen tons of chaff and hay. Levin's farm near Lake Moodemere was described as "one of the best vineyard properties in the district". He was an active member of the Vinegrowers' Association and "was always ready to give the experience he had gained in parliament for the betterment of the industry".

In January 1903 Leyser and Johanna Levin went to live in St Kilda in Melbourne, due to Levin's "failing health".

Leyser Levin died on 26 January 1908 at St Kilda, aged 78. His widow Johanna Levin died at Darlinghurst in Sydney in November 1908, aged 78.

New South Wales Legislative Assembly
Preceded by George Day	Member for Hume; 1880–1885; Served alongside: William Lyne	Succeeded by James Hayes
