= Thomas Mate =

English-born Australian politician

Thomas Hodges Mate (5 April 1810 – 22 July 1894) was an English-born Australian politician.

He was born at Canterbury, the son of Thomas Mate. He migrated to Sydney in 1833 and acquired a sheep and cattle farm on Tarcutta Creek. On 8 February 1836 he married Maria Bardwell, with whom he had seven children; a second marriage in 1882 to Florence Brown would produce a further daughter. In 1850 he settled in Albury, where he established a general store and later served as mayor and alderman. In 1860 he was elected to the New South Wales Legislative Assembly for Hume, serving until his retirement in 1869. Mate died at Manly in 1894.

New South Wales Legislative Assembly
| Preceded by Morris Asher | Member for Hume; 1860–1869 | Succeeded by James Fallon |
