= James Hayes (Australian politician) =

Politician and miller in New South Wales, Australia

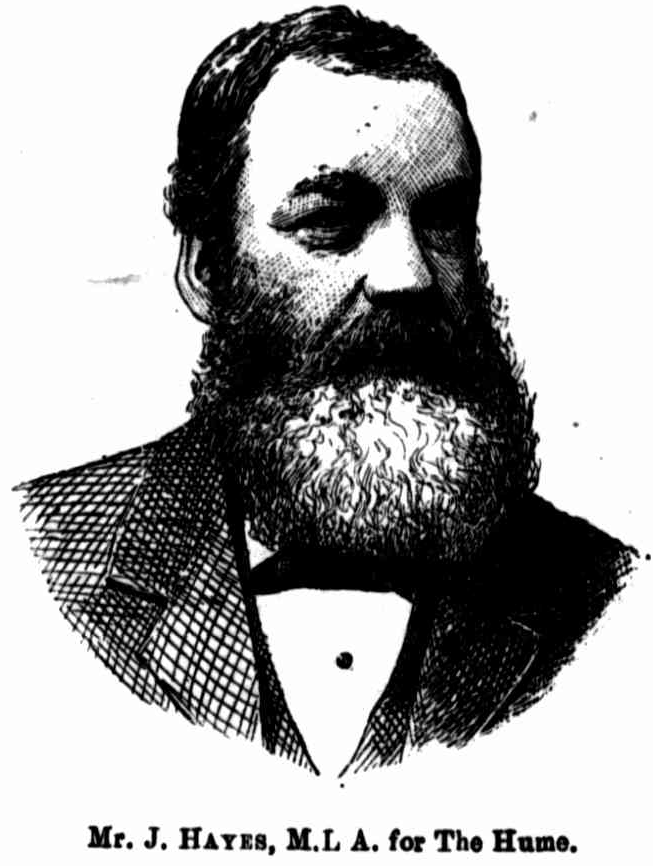

James Hayes (1831 – 24 May 1908) was an Australian politician.

Hayes was born in Cork, Ireland and arrived with parents in New South Wales in 1837. He was educated at a private school near Parramatta and became a miller. He married Frances Foott Besnard on 19 June 1861 and had four daughters and six sons.
Issue:

- Henry John Besnard Hayes
- Frances Mary Louisa Hayes
- Frederick William Hayes
- James Hayes (died young)
- Nicholas Richard Hayes
- Alice Ellen Pope Hayes
- Stanley Herbert Julius Hayes
- Eleanor Maude Isabel Hayes
- Florence Augusta May Hayes
- Eileen Mary Hayes

Hayes was elected as a member for the district of The Hume of the New South Wales Legislative Assembly in 1885 and was re-elected each election until multi-member districts were abolished in 1894, when he switched to the district of The Murray, which he held until 1904. In 1901 he was appointed a minister without portfolio in the See ministry. He did not contest the 1904 election as was appointed to the New South Wales Legislative Council where he served until his death.

He died in the Sydney suburb of Stanmore in 1908 (aged 77).

== Notes ==
New South Wales Legislative Assembly
Preceded by Leyser Levin	Member for The Hume; 1885 – 1894; With: William Lyne	Succeeded by William Lyne
Preceded by Robert Barbour; John Chanter	Member for The Murray; 1894 – 1904	Succeeded by Robert Scobie
