= Gordon McLaurin =

Australian politician

Gordon Ranald McLaurin (1862 – 13 October 1917) was an Australian politician.

== Biography ==
McLaurin was born near Holbrook to Isabella née Rankin and James McLaurin, a pastoralist and politician. He was educated by a private tutor while growing up on his father's station, after which he worked for Goldsbrough Mort & Co. In 1891, he purchased his father's land.

McLaurin's father had briefly been a member of the New South Wales Legislative Assembly for The Hume, and Gordon also became a member of the Legislative Assembly representing The Hume, winning the seat at the 1901 by-election as the Progressive candidate. He transferred to Albury in 1904 and after the collapse of his party, he was one of the few Progressives not to join the Liberal Party, continuing in parliament as an Independent Liberal. He held his seat in 1907, however he was defeated in 1913 by the Labor candidate.

McLaurin died near Holbrook in 1917 (aged 54–55).

New South Wales Legislative Assembly
| Preceded by Sir William Lyne | Member for Hume; 1901–1904 | Abolished |
| Preceded by Thomas Griffith | Member for Albury; 1904–1913 | Succeeded by John Cusack |
