= Alexander Macansh =

- Born: 1803; Doune, Scotland
- Died: 1866 (aged 62–63); Dunfermline, Scotland
- Occupation: Heckler
- Father: Alexander Macansh snr

Alexander Macansh (1803–1866) was a Scottish millworker, poet, lecturer and author in Dunfermline, Scotland.

In spite of working 14-hour days at the mill and dealing with poor health, disabilities and depression, Macansh produced poetry, journal articles and scientific lectures.

Macansh published an anthology of his poetry and a collection of autobiographical works and the texts of his lectures.

== Early years ==
Macansh was born in 1803 in Doune, near Stirling, the illegitimate son of a young flax heckler, Alexander Macansh Sr. Nothing is known about his mother. He was raised by his grandparents, James Macansh (also a flax heckler) and Mary Spittal Macansh. His grandfather died in 1805. Macansh's memories of his early life are all of his grandmother, whom he memorialized in the following poem.

Well I remember all her homely ways
Her cup of tea at early morning tide.
When, creeping from our curtained sleeping place
I nestled down, half naked, at her side.
Receiving from her kind, ungrudging hand
The other crust and, with the other crust,
Some fondling token of maternal trust.
Well I remember how each Sabbath morn
She dressed and trimmed me out, and led me down
To the small village kirk, so old and worn
I firmly holding by her mourning gown
Dressed in my Highland kilt and milk-white hose
She in her widow weeds and high-heeled shoon,
Above her tremulous head and shoulders rose.

Macansh started his education at the village school at the age of five or six. He remembered the habit of Mr Young, the domini, of dismissing his pupils at the end of each day with a Latin quotation. At age 11, Macansh was apprenticed to a flax dresser in Dunfermline. In his poem he remembered

....that dark winter morn when Mary stood -
stood with me in the lamp-light at her door.
Her withered cheek o'er glistening with the dew
Of farewell sorrow; for she inly knew
We were about to part for evermore -
She to the skies, and I to wander forth,
Our ways divided wide as heaven and earth.

In 1814, Macansh started his apprenticeship in a 'sale shop', In this shop, a few men manually prepared flax for women working at their spinning wheels in their own homes. The final process in the preparation of flax for spinning was the combing out of the fibres with an implement called a heckle and the men who did the work were called either 'hecklers' or, more often, flax dressers.

In 1816 Andrew Rutherford opened a further mill at Harribrae, Dunfermline, manufacturing white and coloured yarns for table linen, ticking, sheetings, towellings and shirting, Macansh's father was an overseer at Rutherford's mill and probably got his son a job in 1819 in one of the heckling shops,.

Macansh worked at the mill until it closed in 1852.

== The Heckling Shop ==
Macansh described his time in Rutherford's in an article called 'The Politics of the Workshop'. It was published in instalments in 1854 in The Northern Warder and General Advertiser for the Counties of Fife, Perth, and Forfar. Macansh later updated the article for his anthology Working Man's Bye Hours, published in 1866.

'The Politics of the Workshop' described the political discussions of his fellow workers and their working conditions.

The shop in which I wrought thirty years ago….held a dozen of us, six on each side with a window between every two. The centre of this window was a glazed fixture, the upper and under parts of this were hinged wooden blinds that could be lifted up or lowered down for the admission of fresh air or the emission of dust. In the winter months, November and December especially, this dust, the exhalation of a decayed vegetation, hung over our heads in a cloud so dense that one of my shopmates used to say, playfully, that he could write his name on it This was not the most Arcadian atmosphere for men to labour in from six in the morning till eight at night and not alone for days but for months and years. Many of the men were asthmatic and all were affected more or less with shortness of breath. Out of the dozen in our shop and six in another close by belonging to the same employers, are all dead with the exception of myself and another man.

At age 16, according to Macansh, he was 'attacked with severe pains in his limbs, which, accompanied with a series of cruel accidents reduced him ere he attained his twenty-first year "to a state of dwarfish deformity". This disability exposed him to 'the constant taunts and jeers of his rougher fellow-workmen and the still more torturing expressions of pity from the more kindly-hearted'.

‘The trade at which the writer was employed for thirty-eight years – that of a flax dresser – was of that kind with permits conversation during working hours. The noise is not such as to drown the sound of the voice, but in a large shop, in which a dozen, or perhaps a score of heckles, are ringing, it is so great as to require the voice to be pitched on a rather high key, that the words may be heard and understood. Hecklers, for this reason, have a rather disagreeable habit of talking and reading in the octave key, even in a private room where there is not necessity for any particular elevation of voice.'

Macansh also described a pet bird in the shop and the hecklers' excursions into the countryside with a donkey they had adopted.

....we had a shop bird – indeed we almost always had a bird of some sort – a blackbird, a mavis (song thrush) or a linnet….The bird in question was a green linnet, a fine, strong chap with the closest and glossiest plumage. Dick would feed from the hand, perch upon a shoulder and, above everything in the world, delight in a fight. He would stand in the door of his cage and bending cock-fashion, unshuffled his tippet and attack the finger….We always left his cage door open and gave him full liberty of wing and Dick would suddenly bolt out of his wired domicile and disappearing in the wood behind the shop or west in the fields, be absent for hours amusing himself, how or where no-one could say. Then, all at once, he would dive in through one of the windows and, after taking a sweep two or three times round, would again enter his cage and be tail-up in his seed box ere one could count two. One day when the shopmates were in a very disagreeable mood, launching uncourteous epithets at each other, Dick suddenly swooped in through an open window from one of his excursions and circling round overhead, made a salute at every paper cap as he passed. The effect was electric. A good-humoured laugh took the place of angry invectives and a harmonious conversation followed.

In Macansh's article, he described the lifestyles that produced differing political opinions, beginning with the aristocrat, followed by the middle class merchant and ending with the workman.

The poor workman, again, standing at the foot of the social ladder is by position a Radical - a Chartist. He says, "It is no fault of mine that I am poor, but because I am poor I am disenfranchised, am I? My father, like myself, was a hard working man, with a numerous family and he might have been, in the opinion of these two gentlemen up the trap, not very intelligent. I got little or no schooling. How could I? My mother set me down at the pirn wheel when I was nine years of age. Thence I was sent to the loom when I was eleven. Unfit to pace the treadles from the brevity of my yet ungrown limbs, they had at first to nail bars to enable me to work them with success. I wrought at the trade of making table covers for the more fortunate portions of society for many years, giving my earnings to my parents to enable them to live and bring up the rest and I arrived at manhood with one suit of clothes and my brain as unfurnished as my back with anything more substantial than politics.

It was the custom of the men in the heckling shop to buy various newspapers and they took turns at reading them out loud while the work went on.

We had two newspapers and a weekly political pamphlet. One of them was the Scotsman, not generally liked by our Radical shopmates, for it was then, thirty-five years ago, now forty-seven, wholly literary and political and the tone of its articles, though the most liberal in Scotland at that period, did not come up to our men's ideas of the true Radical standard. The favourites were Wooler's Gazette and his Black Dwarf, the former long since defunct - a firebrand and, like all its class, as stupid as it was violent. The latter a firebrand also....We read by turns, column about, commencing with the editor's commentary, then the Parliamentary debates, then the miscellaneous matter - a murder or a horrible accident always having the preference.

== Scholar, Poet, Journalist and Lecturer ==
After working a 14-hour day in the mill, Macansh would eat supper and then start studying.

In his humble abode in one of the closes off the High Street of Dunfermline, he held championship with the greatest and brightest of intellects. He resumed the Latin studies which fascinated him in his early boyhood at Doune, when old Mr Young, the village schoolmaster, was wont to dismiss his scholars with a classical phrase and caused a far-sounding shout of Ad scholam to be piped when the hour for opening the school approached. He also taught himself French and two or three other Continental languages, without, of course, becoming scholastically proficient; and I think he also knew a little Greek and Hebrew, on which he occasionally held consultations with his friend the Rev. James Mackenzie of the Free Abbey Church. He kept well abreast, too, with modern science and literature, as his published essays and lectures show. He was held in respect by the most cultured men in the town.

In 1850, Macansh's anthology The Social Curse (or Intemperance): A Rhyme and Other Pieces was published in Edinburgh. The 'Rhyme' of the title extended to fifty-three pages and was accompanied by fifty-three 'Other Pieces'. Several of his poems had already been published in the Scotsman in 1828 and 1830, Tait's Magazine and The Edinburgh Literary Journal.

== Published works ==
- The Social Curse (or Intemperance): A Rhyme and Other Pieces published Edinburgh 1850
- Two Essays on the Benefits of Savings Banks to the Working Classes by Alexander Macansh and James Cousin. Published Dunfermline 1852
- Working Man's Bye-Hours: Essays, Lectures, Poems. published by William Clark, Dunfermline, 1866
