= James Fallon High School =

Location
- 400 Fallon Street, North Albury, New South Wales; Australia; 36°3′44″S 146°56′6″E

Information
- Former name: Albury North High School (1961–1996)
- Type: Government-funded co-educational comprehensive secondary day school
- Motto: Together We Succeed
- Established: January 1961; 65 years ago (as Albury North High School)
- School district: Riverina
- Educational authority: NSW Department of Education
- Principal: Jennifer Parrett
- Teaching staff: 62.4 FTE (2018)
- Years: 7–12
- Enrolment: 733 (2018)
- Campus type: Regional
- Colours: Navy blue and maroon
- Website: jamesfallo-h.schools.nsw.gov.au

James Fallon High School is a government-funded co-educational comprehensive secondary day school, located in North Albury, a city in the Riverina region of New South Wales, Australia.

Established in 1961 as Albury North High School, the school enrolled approximately 730 students in 2018, from Year 7 to Year 12, of whom 15 percent identified as Indigenous Australians and seven percent were from a language background other than English. The school is operated by the NSW Department of Education; the principal is Jennifer Parrett.

== History ==
The establishment of the school resulted from a realisation (originally in 1954) that the town of Albury would need a second high school. It was established to serve the educational needs of the rapidly developing North Albury and Lavington area, and its original name was Albury North High School. It was first opened in 1961, receiving a student intake of 150 students in January (housed in the town's other high school) and moving into its own first new buildings in June of that year.

There was a fire in B Block in 1973. In 1982 an Aboriginal Liaison Officer was appointed. This is believed to be the first such appointment in a NSW school. Visual Arts Head Teacher John Skillington designed the Centenary of Federation Medallion. The school has participated in 126 Rock Eisteddfod Challenges; participating in the Premier Division for the past 7 years.

=== Name change ===
The name of the school was changed in 1996 to James Fallon High School. Further, the motto became "excellence in diversity".

James Fallon (1823–1886) was an Irish-born businessman (son of a farmer in Athlone, Ireland) who arrived in Sydney in 1841 and moved to Albury in 1854 to open a general store. He rose to great prominence in the town, and served (from 1859) as its first mayor. He also became a successful vineyard owner and wine merchant.

== Facilities ==
The school currently has a hall, a dance hall, seven school teaching blocks, two large ovals and a multi-sports complex.

== Notable alumni ==
- Dominic Thornely – cricket player; represented the New South Wales Blues
- Ethan Hailey – Snow Skiing; represented Australia at Hakuba

== See also ==
- List of government schools in New South Wales: G–P
- List of schools in the Riverina
- Education in Australia
