= Agnes Sillars Hamilton =

Scottish reformer, public lecturer and phrenologist

- Born: Agnes Sillars; 1790s Scotland
- Died: 22 October 1870; Edinburgh, Scotland
- Known for: Phrenology
- Spouse: Edward Hamilton
- Children: Archibald Sillars Hamilton

Agnes Hamilton née Sillars (born c. 1794, died Edinburgh 22 October 1870) was a Scottish reformer, public lecturer and phrenologist who argued for women's right to an education which promoted gender equality.

== Life ==
She was born in about 1794 and her parents were Jane (born MacDougall) and Archibald Sillars. In 1819 married Edward Hamilton and they had a son, Archibald Sillars Hamilton.

She comes to notice in 1832 when she was known as a lecturer on politics. By 1836, she was being described by the Leeds Times as a 'phenomenon in politics'.

She gave public lectures on phrenology, religious liberty as a right, and on women's right to an education which promoted gender equality.

By the 1840s she was reported as dealing in "practical phrenology". Hamilton would use a group of marbles to illustrate the principles of phrenology. Over fifteen years she said that she had analysed the heads of 60,000 people as she toured throughout Britain and Ireland. Where she gathered interest she would spend some months in that town but in other cases she would quickly move on.

She was well received but she was not able to retire and she attracted varying reviews from acknowledged phrenologists George Combe and Andrew Combe of the Edinburgh Phrenological Society. One account notes her as a "dirty old wench".

Her son Archibald Sillars Hamilton was a phrenologist in his twenties and he left for Australia in 1854 where he continued that profession. Archibald was given the head of Ned Kelly after his death and he published an account of the skull's phrenology.

Hamilton died in Edinburgh in 1870.
