= James Fallon (politician) =

Irish-born Australian vigneron and politician

James Thomas Fallon

Member for Hume (NSW Legislative Assembly)
- In office 23 December 1869 – 3 February 1872

Personal details
- Born: c. 1819^{[A]} Athlone, Ireland
- Died: 26 May 1886 (aged 67) Manly, New South Wales
- Parents: James Fallon (father); Margaret (née Norton) (mother)

James Thomas Fallon (c. 1819 – 26 May 1886) was an Irish-born Australian vigneron, viticulturist, wine merchant and politician, best known as an enterprising pioneer of the Australian wine industry. He was a strong promoter of the emerging colonial wine industry and an important figure in the development of an export trade in wine.

Fallon served as the first mayor of Albury township in the period July 1859 to February 1862. In January 1870 he was elected as the member for the Hume electorate in the New South Wales Legislative Assembly, serving for one term until February 1872.

== Biography ==
=== Early life ===
James Thomas Fallon was born in about 1819 in Athlone in central Ireland, on the border of counties Roscommon and Westmeath, the son of James Fallon and Margaret (née Norton or Naughton). His father was a farmer. Young James "received a good liberal education" at the Athlone Grammar School.^{[A]}

=== Goldfields ===
Fallon emigrated to Australia as a young man under the bounty immigration scheme, departing from Plymouth aboard the barque John Renwick and arriving at Sydney on 31 August 1841.

Fallon was described as "an Irishman of good position and attainments, but without any means". In partnership with J. Plumb, Fallon leased a property called 'Brisbane Meadows', owned by the Mitchell family, in the Southern Tablelands district near Bungonia township, in the colony of New South Wales. Fallon was involved in establishing a school at the nearby community of Bungonia.

In September 1851 alluvial gold was discovered in the Araluen Valley, south of Braidwood. By the end of October many of the miners attracted to the area began moving to nearby Upper Bell's Creek, north of Araluen township, after gold was found there. By May 1852 Fallon had established a store on the goldfields at Bell's Creek.

Fallon later established general stores on 'The Ovens' diggings in north-eastern Victoria, at the Yackandandah and Indigo goldfields (south of Albury on the Murray River).

=== Albury ===
By early 1854 James Fallon had established a general store in Kiewa Street at Albury, known as the Commercial Store.

In October 1854 Fallon met up with his younger brother, Patrick Edward Fallon, who had emigrated to Melbourne from the United States. After his older brother had emigrated to Australia in 1841, Patrick had remained in Ireland where he experienced "the horrors of the famine years" of 1847 and 1848. In 1852 he emigrated to the United States, living in New York, but after two years he emigrated to Australia to join his brother. In Melbourne the Fallon brothers purchased "a quantity of goods" which they transported to the diggings at Yackandandah.

In April 1858 James Fallon selected 164 acres of land at North Barnawartha (in Victoria, south of 'Wodonga' station), which he purchased for one pound per acre.

After the borough of Albury was incorporated as a municipality, in July 1859 Fallon was one of nine aldermen elected to the newly-formed Albury Municipal Council. In a vote by the elected aldermen, he was chosen as the first mayor of Albury. In February 1860, at a special meeting of council, Fallon was re-elected as mayor for the ensuing twelve months.

In January 1860 a prospectus for the formation of a limited liability company called the Murray Valley Vineyard Association was published. The proposed company had the broad objective of "encouraging the growth of the grape in the district of the Upper Murray". The first meeting of the directors of the company was held on 15 February 1860 at the Imperial Hotel. The company directors included the mayor James Fallon, two other local aldermen J. Roper and James McLaurin and the Albury police magistrate Heyward Atkins. In May 1860 an amended scheme to launch the company "into active life" was recommended by a sub-committee of the Association. It was proposed that the company be constituted, with limited liability, by the issue of 2,400 shares of five pounds each (with half the share value paid as a deposit, and the remainder "called up when required").

From January 1861 the business of the Commercial Stores in Kiewa Street, general storekeepers and wholesale spirit merchants of Albury, was conducted under the name of Fallon Brothers.

At a special meeting of Albury Municipal Council in February 1861 James Fallon was re-elected as mayor against one other candidate. Fallon retired from the council in February 1862.

=== Wine-making ===
In 1863 Fallon was reported as the owner of two year-old grapevines on five acres of land near the Indigo Creek, and was in the process of planting out five acres more.

In 1864 Fallon completed the construction of new stores in a central location in Kiewa Street in Albury. Fallon was active in community affairs and took a particular interest in local education. By May 1865 he was serving as the honorary secretary of the Albury Model School.

In June 1865 it was reported that James Fallon had purchased the whole of the previous year's vintage of the Murray Valley Vineyard Company (apart from one quarter cask bought privately), and intended selling colonial wine at prices significantly below "those lately charged in Albury". The protectionist tariffs imposed by the colony of Victoria on goods imported from other Australian colonies affected the financial viability of the Murray Valley Vineyard Company by preventing the sale of their wine at competitive prices in Victoria. The Murray Valley Vineyard had been operating at a loss, costing the company shareholders about seven thousand pounds by the end of 1866, "the first large vineyard that has succumbed under the devastating influence of the border customs". Unable to avoid tariffs into the Victorian market the company was forced to sell their wine for three shillings a gallon, "which was unremunerative". In November 1866 the property belonging to the Murray Valley Vineyard Company was put up for auction, but failed to attract a single bid. The company property of 640 acres (259 ha) was located about three miles north-east of Albury, comprising twenty-five acres of shiraz, riesling and brown muscat grapevines, a further ten acres cleared and prepared for trenching and the buildings and wine production plant required "for a first-class vine-growing establishment". In December 1867 the Murray Valley Vineyard was sold by auction "in virtue of a power of sale contained in a mortgage deed". The property was sold for £2,300 to James Fallon, "this amount being sufficient to cover the principal and interest secured by the mortgage" and included the vineyard's plant and equipment. The investment into the property by the company had totalled £8,300 and the newspaper report of the sale commented that "we fancy that Mr. Fallon has cause to congratulate himself on his bargain".

After the railway connecting Melbourne to Echuca was completed in September 1864, followed by the construction of the Port of Echuca Wharf in 1865, a busy steamer trade developed linking townships on the inland rivers to the Echuca railhead. In June 1866 the side-paddle river steamer Cumberoona was built for the Albury Steam Navigation Company and launched at Echuca. The vessel was named after John Hore's pastoral station of the same name near Albury. From July 1866 the partnership of 'W. M. N. Edmondson and others' owned and operated the Cumberoona between Echuca and Albury, carrying goods and passengers to and from the Victorian railhead at Echuca, whenever the Murray River was navigable. 'W. M. N. Edmondson and others' was a partnership of seven businessmen and pastoralists from Albury and the surrounding district, one of whom was James Fallon.^{[B]}

=== Expansion ===
In early 1867 an agreement between the colonies of Victoria and New South Wales (known as the 'border customs treaty') enabled the free trade in wine between the colonies.

Fallon's Murray Valley Vineyard was described as being "prettily situated on ground rising or sloping in three directions, and snowy mountains in the distance makes the view a very fine and picturesque one". Fallon recognised the value of "a proper and systematic development" of winemaking. He enlarged the property and erected the largest cellars in the colony, giving practical proof "of the sincerity of his conviction that some day the wines of Australia would constitute the largest item on the list of Australian exports". For many years he carried on "a very large and flourishing trade, acquiring a considerable amount of freehold property".

In late 1868 Fallon began construction of "a wine cellar of immense size, and admirably adapted for the storage of wines". Located in Kiewa Street, Albury, the cellar and brick building above was build to provide storage space for casks and fermentation facilities.

In March 1870 Fallon had sent a shipment of his wines to London, with instructions to his agents to store it for three years. The purpose of the consignment was to test the "keeping qualities" of the wine under export conditions. The wines sent to England were of the 1867 vintage, a total of ten hogsheads of muscat, riesling, cabernet and shiraz wines. The wines were sampled after arrival in London, and were "found to be in excellent condition". At the end of the three year period Fallon instructed that the stored wines should be returned to Australia.

Fallon's wine cellars in Kiewa Street were situated below a brick building of offices and storage space. The cellars, supported by large pillars and cross pieces of river red gum, contained rows of oval casks, each with a capacity of 1500 gallons. In April 1872 the cellars were storing twenty thousand gallons of wine produced from the last season's harvest from forty vineyards. By 1872 the Murray Valley Vineyard had 140 acres (57 ha) of vines, laid out in squares of ten acres each. About fifty acres were planted with riesling grapes. Other varieties grown at the vineyard included verdelho, tokay, shiraz, burgundy and cabernet.

In about 1871 Fallon gave up his business in Albury and relocated to Sydney "for the purpose of entirely devoting himself to the development of the wine trade" and "of furthering the interests of winegrowers". However, throughout the remainder of his life Fallon maintained his close connection with the Albury district and was a frequent visitor.

=== Member for Hume ===
At the general election held in December 1869 and January 1870 there were two nominations to contest the Hume electorate in the New South Wales Legislative Assembly, an electoral district on the border with the colony of Victoria and which included the township of Albury. At the election Fallon was opposed to the sitting member, Thomas H. Mate, who had held the seat since December 1860. Fallon topped the poll with 513 votes (or 57.8 percent).

In a speech at Albury after his election Fallon was critical of the "lavish" government funding of infrastructure in the vicinity of Sydney at the expense of districts more distant from the metropolis. He spoke of the government's determination to terminate the railway system at Wagga Wagga, in order to "not play into the hands of the Victorian Government", and described the decision as "a dog-in-the-manger policy". Fallon maintained that if the New South Wales government refused to allow the residents of his electorate "their fair share of representation and of expenditure, separation or annexation would have to become the cry". During his speech he supported the contention that the Murrumbidgee River was the natural boundary of Victoria and expressed support for the district to be annexed to the colony of Victoria.

In early 1872 Fallon declined to stand for re-election at the New South Wales colonial election held in February and March 1872.

=== Wine promotion ===
After retiring from parliament Fallon visited England on several occasions, "with a view to bring Australian wines more prominently before the British public". By 1872 he had set up a distillery, a central depot in Sydney and cellars in Melbourne and was exporting wine to England, North America, India, Ceylon and New Zealand.

Fallon left Melbourne for Europe in 1873 with the "sole object and intention" of visiting "all the vineyards of known celebrity in the wine-growing districts of the continent". He inspected vineyards in the Rhine district of Germany and in the Médoc, Burgundy, Charente and Champagne regions of France. Fallon also attended the Vienna International Exhibition held from May to October 1873.

On 3 December 1873 Fallon presented a paper at a meeting of the Society of Arts in London on the topic of 'Australian vines and wines'. He argued that "the merits of good Australian wine were not recognised in England". After giving a comprehensive summary of the history of vineyards and wine-making in the Australian colonies, Fallon asserted that British duties discriminated against Australian wines compared to those of European countries. He explained that Australian wines often had an alcoholic strength above the maximum of twenty-six degree proof fixed under the customs' tariff and were therefore required to pay a duty of two shillings and sixpence per gallon. European wines, in comparison, had a lower alcoholic strength and were subjected to the lower duty of one shilling per gallon. Fallon concluded by arguing that "Australian vignerons... have a right to ask the Government of this country for a change of tariff, whereby their wines may be admitted at such a rate of duty that they may compete with Continental wines on an equal footing". During the discussion after his presentation, Dr. Thudichum asserted that Fallon's claims for the strength of colonial wines were opposed to all established scientific facts, claiming "that nowhere was any wine made which naturally had above 26 per cent of proof spirit". During his overseas visit Fallon engaged Léonce Frère, a distinguished French vigneron, to manage his Murray Valley vineyard and produce champagne.

The Press Room at the Murray Valley Vineyard, published in Illustrated Sydney News, 12 June 1880.

The shipment of Fallon's wines sent to London in 1870 were returned to Australia, as instructed, after three years, as a further test of their "keeping qualities" under export conditions. They arrived in Melbourne by the ship Calcutta in July 1873 and were judged to be in "superb condition... proving that a sea voyage would do no injury to a well-made wine".

Fallon travelled back to Australia aboard the S.S. Northumberland, which arrived at Melbourne in early May 1874.

As a result of Dr. Thudichum's claim that 26 degree proof was the upper alcoholic limit for the fermentation of wine, on his return to Australia Fallon undertook to have his wines evaluated for alcoholic strength in an effort to prove his contention that the strength of Australian wines "was due to natural causes". He had the grapes harvested and fermented under his personal supervision. The Chief Inspectors of Distilleries of both Victoria and New South Wales visited the Albury vineyards to test the wine. The results justified Fallon's claims, with the highest figure obtained being 32.4 degree proof without fortification. On 20 June 1876 Fallon presented these results before the Royal Colonial Institute in London (later published as The Wines of Australia).

Under Léonce Frère's management Fallon's winery near Albury produced the first champagne from Australian grapes in 1876. Fallon demonstrated that "first-class champagne" could be made in Australia "by engaging a French gentleman of large experience to come to Albury and superintend the manufacture".

=== Last years ===
In October 1882 Fallon's Murray Valley Vineyard won a silver medal for a cabernet wine, 1868 vintage, at the Bordeaux Wine Exhibition in France. The wine jury at the exhibition was reported to have been "favourably impressed with the excellence of the Australian exhibits".

After Fallon had spent a decade lobbying for the change, in early 1886 the lower-duty alcohol threshold for British duties on imported wine was raised to 30 degree proof, a variation heralded just months before his death and not ratified until months afterwards. The change was formalised in an amendment to the British Customs and Inland Revenue Act of 1886, brought about as part of a commercial treaty with Spain, but also applicable to all other countries including the British colonies.

James Thomas Fallon died "after a short illness" on 26 May 1886 at his residence, 'Riverstone Cottage' at Manly, aged 67.

Fallon's remains were buried at Albury after a funeral held there on 29 May. The funeral was "the largest that has taken place there for many years", with all the places of business being closed for the afternoon. The mayor and aldermen attended in a body. Fallon was described in The Albury Banner newspaper as "a kindhearted man, of liberal views, generous disposition, and genial manner, he was a general favourite with all who enjoyed the pleasure of his acquaintance".

The editorial in The Albury Banner foresaw a time when the wine industry in Australia attained great importance to the nation, "and when the time arrives, it must perforce be admitted that the foundations of the prosperity attained were in no small measure the work of J. T. Fallon of Albury". Fallon left his estate of twenty thousand pounds to his brother Patrick who carried on the Murray Valley Vineyard. The vineyard was destroyed by phylloxera, but was replanted and wine was made there by the Fallon family until the 1930s.

== Publications ==
- The 'Murray Valley Vineyard' Albury, New South Wales, and 'Australian Vines and Wines', Melbourne: Azzoppardi, Hildreth & Co., February 1874; "... extracts from the Press, &c., coupled with a Paper... read by Mr. Jas. T. Fallon at the Society of Arts' Meeting in London, Dec. 3, 1873".
- J. T. Fallon (1876), The Wines of Australia, "A Paper read before the Royal Colonial Institute on the 20th of June, 1876", London: Unwin Brothers.

== Legacy ==
In 1996 the Albury North High School, established in 1961 and serving the North Albury and Lavington areas, had its name changed to the James Fallon High School.

== Notes ==
A.Some biographical records and one contemporary obituary of James Thomas Fallon state that he was born in about 1823. However, Fallon's obituary in The Albury Banner and newspaper notifications of his death state that he was aged 67 when he died in May 1886, leading to the conclusion (as stated in the aforementioned obituary) that he was born in "about the year 1819". A birthdate of about 1819 is considered most likely to be correct.

B.The partnership trading as 'W. M. N. Edmondson and others' was made up of seven businessmen and pastoralists from Albury and district, namely: William M. N. Edmondson, James Thomas Fallon, George Day and Kenneth McLennan, Thomas H. Mate of Tarcutta, John Dight of 'Bungowamah' station and John Hore of 'Cumberoona' station. The partnership was formed for the purpose of operating as a steam navigation company to carry passengers and goods on the inland rivers (principally the Murray, Murumbidgee and Darling rivers), with each partner contributing capital of six hundred pounds to the enterprise. Although the partnership was formally instituted on 15 August 1866, it had been operating informally before that, in particular involving the purchase of the newly-built steamer Cumberoona in June or July 1866.
