= John Macansh =

Australian politician

The Honourable John MacAnsh
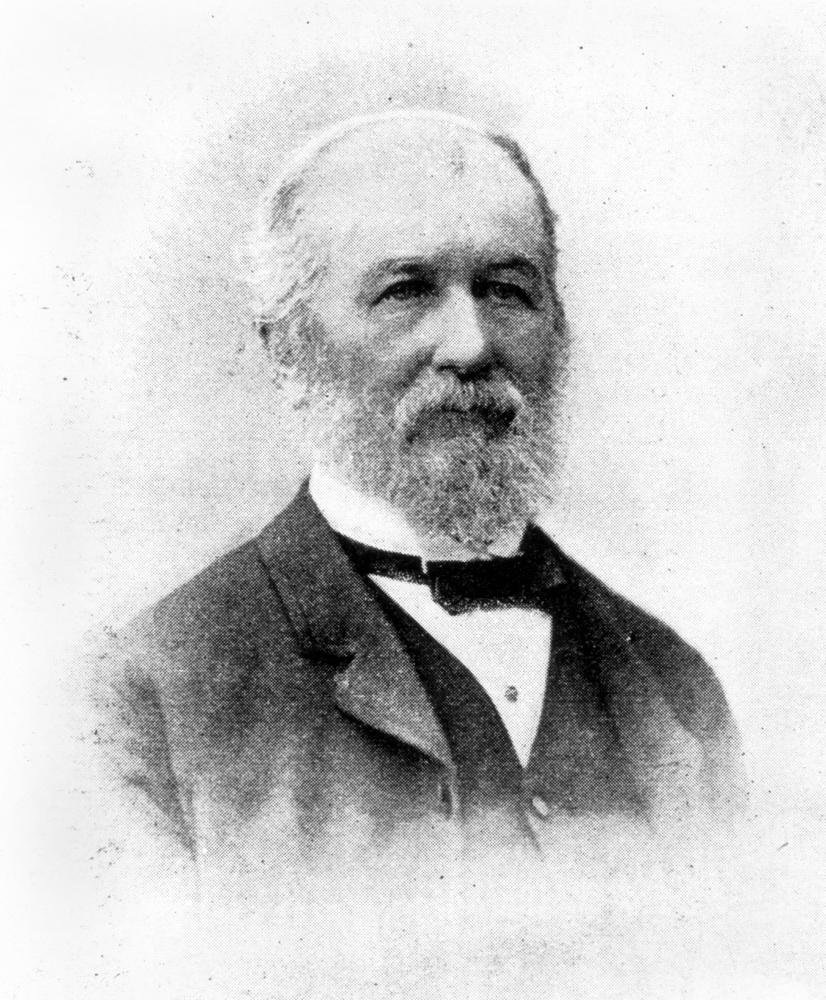

Member of the Queensland Legislative Council
- In office 17 April 1886 – 1 August 1896

Personal details
- Born: John Donald MacAnsh; 31 May 1820 Stirling, Scotland
- Died: 1 August 1896 (aged 76) Warwick, Queensland, Australia
- Spouse: Sarah Jane Windeyer (m.1849 d.1900)
- Occupation: Cattle breeder, Grazier

John Donald Macansh (31 May 1820 – 1 August 1896) was a member of the Queensland Legislative Council.

== Business career ==
Macansh was born in Stirling, Scotland in 1820 to John Macansh and his wife Ann (née White) and was educated at Edinburgh High School and Stirling Grammar. Arriving in Australia in 1838, he worked as a clerk for the Bank of Australasia before leasing a property on the Hunter River in 1840. Around 1846 he moved to Murrumburrah and began work as a Station manager for S.K. Salting and together they established a merino stud at Bonyeo. Macansh worked at various properties in the Yass area of New South Wales and in 1867 he joined in partnership with two of Salting's sons to purchase a property near Narrabri.

By 1875, Macansh had moved to Queensland and bought Canning Downs on the Darling Downs and in 1880 he purchased Albilbah Station. He used Canning Downs to breed stud dairy and beef cattle and then he obtained a lease on Brunette Downs Station in the Northern Territory.

== Political career ==
Macansh was elected to the Glengallan Divisional Board and then was appointed to the Queensland Legislative Council in April 1886 which he served until his death ten years later. His liberal policies had little impact with the other Legislative Council members and none of his objectives were realised.

== Personal life ==
In 1849, he married Sarah Jane Windeyer daughter of Archibald Windeyer, a landowner and pastoralist. He died while attending a Glengallan Divisional Board meeting in August 1896 and his will, valued nominally at £241,588, was administered by a family trust that needed to be legalised by a private members bill in 1910.
