= James Rodd (Australian politician) =

Australian politician

James Rodd (1830 – 31 March 1900) was an English-born Australian politician.

== Early life ==
He was born at Rayleigh in Essex to James Rodd and Ann Alabaster. He migrated to Sydney in 1857 and went to the goldfields at Braidwood, where he opened a store. On 11 June 1861 he married Jane Gregson, with whom he had a son; both mother and son died soon after birth. He remarried Ellen Alicia Madden on 23 September 1871. In 1866 he was appointed a magistrate.

== Politics ==
He was elected to the New South Wales Legislative Assembly for Goldfields South in 1865. In 1867 a Royal Commission was appointed to enquire into crime in the Braidwood district, in reference to the crimes of the bushrangers the Clarke brothers, and whether police and magistrates had been diligent in seeking to apprehend them. Rodd's electorate included the Braidwood goldfields and he gave evidence before the commission which was critical of magistrate Rowland Hassall. The commissioners reported that Hassall "has refrained from taking any open or active part against the bushrangers or their associates, to preserve himself and his property from outrage and depredation. He has throughout evaded his duty as a Magistrate, by systematically abstaining from adjudicating, or in any way taking part in cases against such offenders or their connections". Hassall subsequently sued Rodd for slander in relation to his evidence before the royal commission. The case was prosecuted by the current and 2 former Attorneys General, Sir William Manning QC, John Darvall QC and Sir James Martin QC. Rodd was represented by Henry Stephen and Edward Butler, instructed by Joseph Leary, in successfully defending the case in a trial lasting 15 days. Rodd incurred costs of £1,947 9s 3d, recovering £1,171 0s 5d from Hassall. In 1871 he sought that the government pay the balance of £755 6s, which was initially refused, however the parliament authorised the expenditure in January 1873.

He did not contest the 1869 election. In 1872 he unsuccessfully stood for The Nepean, before being elected for Goldfields North. He was bankrupted in 1874 and forced to resign.

By 1880 he was working in Sydney as an auctioneer.

Rodd died in 1900 (aged 69–70).

New South Wales Legislative Assembly
Preceded by Bowie Wilson	Member for Goldfields South; 1865–1869	Succeeded by Ezekiel Baker
Preceded by Robert Forster	Member for Goldfields North; 1872–1874	Succeeded by Robert Forster
