= James McLaurin =

Scottish-born Australian politician

James McLaurin (23 July 1821 – 10 November 1891) was a Scottish-born Australian politician.

He was born at Dunoon in Argyllshire to farmer James McLaurin and Mary McGibbon. He migrated to Sydney in 1838 and worked as a station manager at Singleton. He married twice: first to Anne Sparrow, with whom he had no children, and secondly to Isabella McDonald Rankin, with whom he had eight children. He went to the Victorian goldfields in 1852, and from 1859 to 1860 was an alderman at Albury.

He was elected to the New South Wales Legislative Assembly for Hume at the 1872 election, but he resigned in 1873. One of his sons, Gordon, was also a member of the Legislative Assembly for The Hume.

McLaurin died at Yarra Yarra Station near Holbrook in 1891.

New South Wales Legislative Assembly
Preceded by James Fallon	Member for Hume; 1872–1873	Succeeded by Thomas Robertson
