= 1872 New South Wales colonial election =

Colonial election for New South Wales, Australia in 1872

- 13 February 1872 – 28 March 1872

All 72 seats in the New South Wales Legislative Assembly 37 Assembly seats were needed for a majority
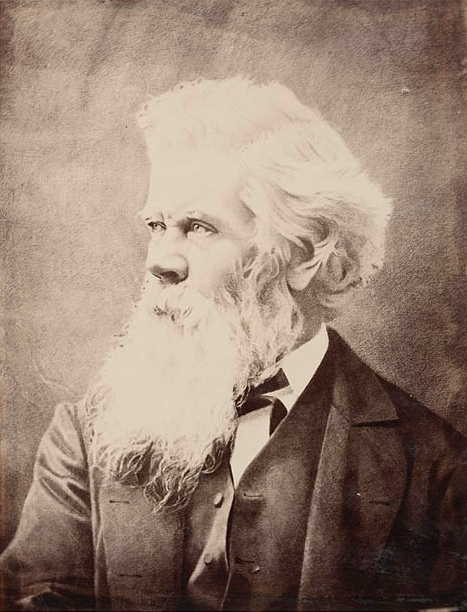

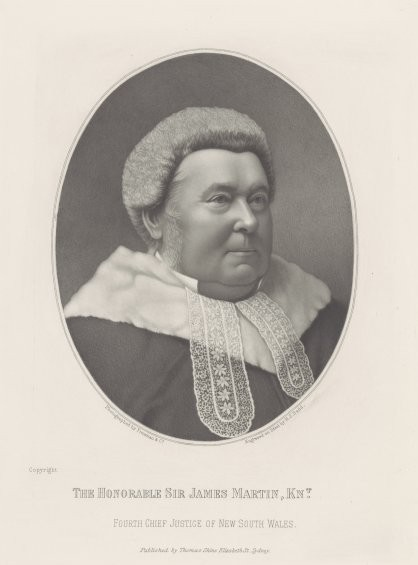

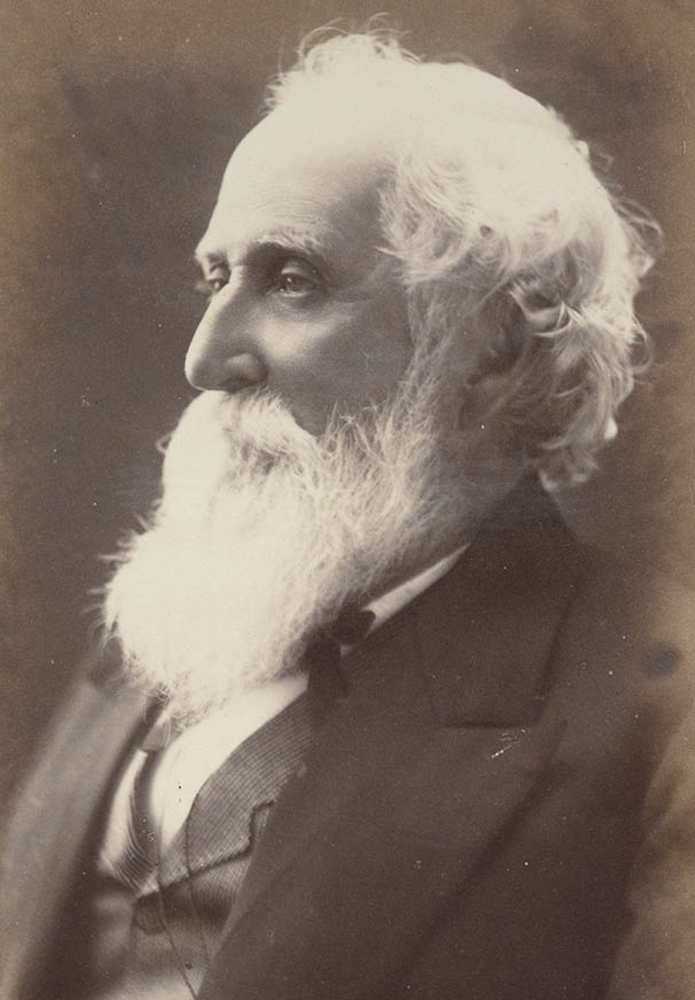
	First party	Second party	Third party
Leader	Henry Parkes	Sir James Martin	John Robertson
Party	Opposition	Government	Robertsonite
Leader's seat	Mudgee (elected to East Sydney)	East Sydney (elected to East Macquarie)	West Sydney
Seats before	38	18	3
Seats won	46	6	3
Seat change	▲8	▼12	Steady
- Results of the election, showing winners in each seat. Seats without member charts indicate the electorate returned one member.
Premier before election
Sir James Martin
Elected Premier
Henry Parkes

The 1872 New South Wales colonial election was held between 13 February and 28 March 1872. This election was for all of the 72 seats in the New South Wales Legislative Assembly and it was conducted in 52 single-member constituencies, six 2-member constituencies and two 4-member constituencies, all with a first past the post system. Suffrage was limited to adult white males. The previous parliament of New South Wales was dissolved on 3 February 1872 by the Governor, Lord Belmore, on the advice of the Premier, Sir James Martin.

There was no recognisable party structure at this election; instead the government was determined by a loose, shifting factional system.

== Key dates ==
Date	Event
3 February 1872	The Legislative Assembly was dissolved, and writs were issued by the Governor to proceed with an election.
12 February to 7 March 1872	Nominations for candidates for the election closed.
13 February to 28 March 1872	Polling days.
30 April 1872	Opening of new Parliament.

== Results ==
New South Wales colonial election, 13 February 1872 – 28 March 1872 Legislative Assembly << 1869–70–1874–75 >>
Enrolled voters					
Votes cast	91,784		Turnout	48.44	−5.26
Informal votes	642		Informal	1.00	+0.59
Summary of votes by party
Party	Primary votes	%	Swing	Seats	Change
Total	91,784			72	

== See also ==
- Members of the New South Wales Legislative Assembly, 1872–1874
- Candidates of the 1872 New South Wales colonial election
