= Thomas Robertson (Australian politician) =

English-born Australian politician

Thomas Robertson (1830 – 1 October 1891) was an English-born Australian politician.

He was born at Windsor in Berkshire to Thomas Robertson, who taught mathematics at Eton College, and Isabella Stevenson. He migrated to New South Wales, becoming a squatter in the Clarence River area. He subsequently qualified as a solicitor and in 1863 settled at Deniliquin, where he was a long time alderman of the Municipality of Deniliquin and twice elected Mayor of Deniliquin. On 26 February 1857 he married Jane Susannah Cunningham, with whom he had twelve children. In 1873 he was elected to the New South Wales Legislative Assembly for Hume, but he was defeated in 1874. Robertson died at Hay in 1891 (aged 61).

New South Wales Legislative Assembly
| Preceded by James McLaurin | Member for Hume; 1873 – 1874 | Succeeded by George Day |
Civic offices
| Preceded by James Watson | Mayor of Deniliquin; February 1871 – February 1873 | Succeeded by James Watson |
