= William Lyne =

Australian politician (1844–1913)

The Honourable Sir William Lyne KCMG
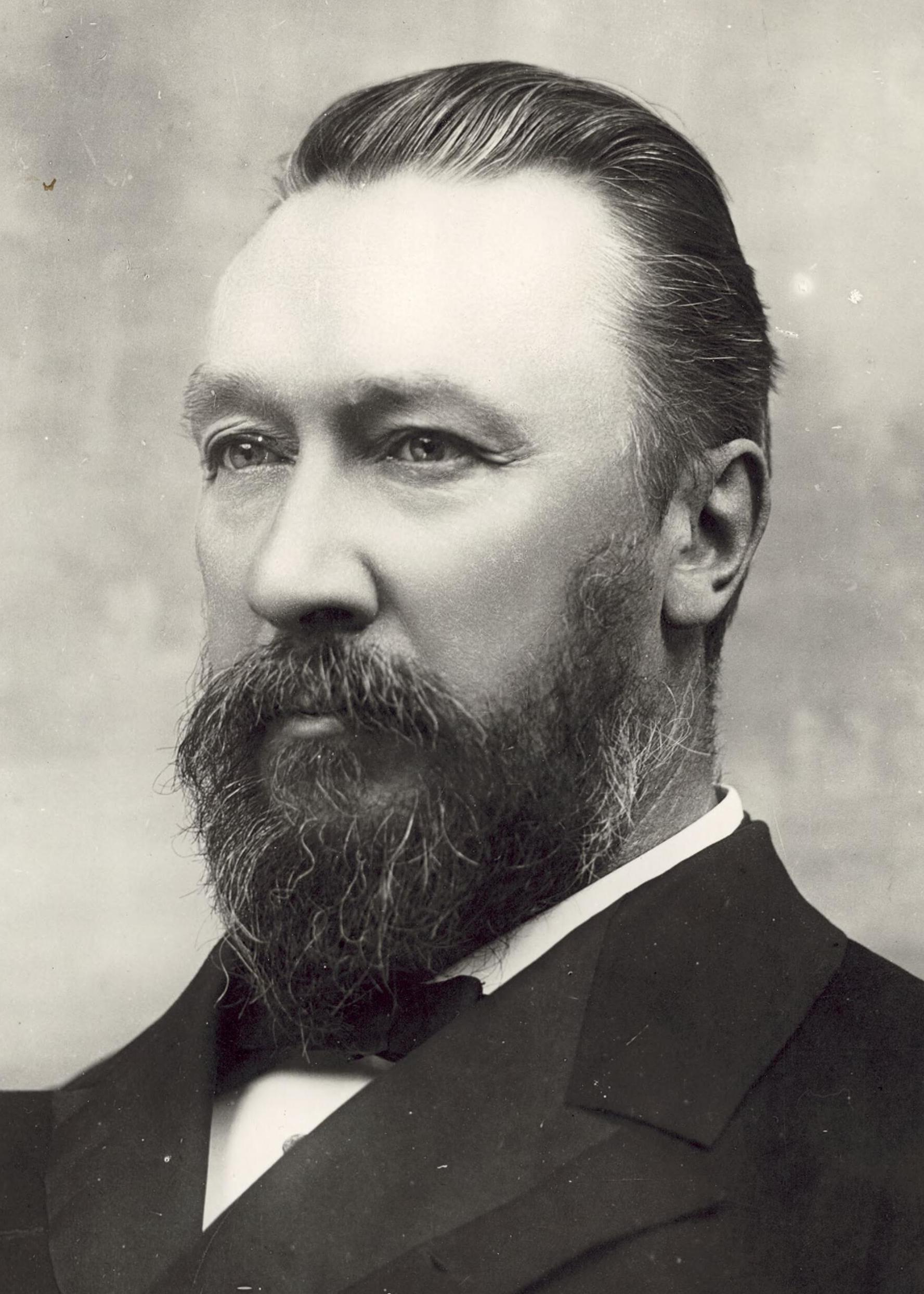

Treasurer of Australia
- In office 30 July 1907 – 12 November 1908
- Prime Minister: Alfred Deakin
- Preceded by: John Forrest
- Succeeded by: Andrew Fisher

Minister for Trade and Customs
- In office 5 July 1905 – 30 July 1907
- Prime Minister: Alfred Deakin
- Preceded by: Allan McLean
- Succeeded by: Austin Chapman
- In office 11 August 1903 – 27 April 1904
- Prime Minister: Edmund Barton; Alfred Deakin
- Preceded by: Charles Kingston
- Succeeded by: Andrew Fisher

Minister for Home Affairs
- In office 1 January 1901 – 11 August 1903
- Prime Minister: Edmund Barton
- Preceded by: New office
- Succeeded by: John Forrest

Premier of New South Wales
- In office 14 September 1899 – 27 March 1901
- Governor: Lord Beauchamp
- Preceded by: George Reid
- Succeeded by: John See

Member of the Australian Parliament for Hume
- In office 29 March 1901 – 13 May 1913
- Preceded by: New division
- Succeeded by: Robert Patten

Member of the New South Wales Parliament for Hume
- In office 29 November 1880 – 20 March 1901
- Preceded by: George Day
- Succeeded by: Gordon McLaurin

Personal details
- Born: 6 April 1844 Great Swanport, Van Diemen's Land, Australia
- Died: 3 August 1913 (aged 69) Double Bay, New South Wales, Australia
- Party: Protectionist (before 1909); Independent (after 1909)
- Spouses: Martha Shaw (m. 1870–1903) Sarah Olden (m. 1905)
- Relations: John Lyne (father); Carmichael Lyne (brother)

Sir William John Lyne KCMG (6 April 1844 – 3 August 1913) was an Australian politician who served as Premier of New South Wales from 1899 to 1901, and later as a federal cabinet minister under Edmund Barton and Alfred Deakin. He is best known as the subject of the so called "Hopetoun Blunder", unexpectedly being asked to serve as the first Prime Minister of Australia but proving unable to form a government.

Lyne was born in Van Diemen's Land, the son of a pastoral farmer. When he was 20, he and cousin took up a sheep station in North West Queensland. However, he moved back home after a few years and found work in local government. Lyne moved to New South Wales in 1875, buying a station near Albury and becoming prominent in community affairs. He was elected to the colonial Legislative Assembly in 1880, and first entered cabinet in 1885 under George Dibbs. He was a member of the Protectionist Party, and a major opponent of free-traders Henry Parkes and George Reid.

Lyne was elected leader of the Protectionists in 1895, and became Leader of the Opposition in New South Wales. He stood aside in 1898, but returned as leader the following year and became premier at the head of a coalition with the Labor Party. Lyne led an energetic and progressive government, instituting a number of major social reforms such as the introduction of compulsory arbitration and the early closing of shops together with legislation for accommodation for shearers and aged pensions.

He considered the draft constitution to be too unfavourable to New South Wales and supported the "no" vote at the 1898 and 1899 referendums.

In 1900, Lyne was asked by Lord Hopetoun (the incoming governor-general) to lead Australia's first national government. Hopetoun was relying on the precedent established at Canadian Confederation, where the premier of the largest colony became the prime minister of the new federation. However, Lyne had no support from leading federationists and was forced to relinquish the honour to Edmund Barton. Lyne became Minister for Home Affairs in Barton's government, and was later Minister for Trade and Customs and Treasurer under Alfred Deakin. Lyne opposed the formation of the new Commonwealth Liberal Party in 1909 and spent the rest of his career as a crossbencher, supporting Andrew Fisher's Labor government. He lost his seat at the 1913 election and died a few months later.

== Early life ==
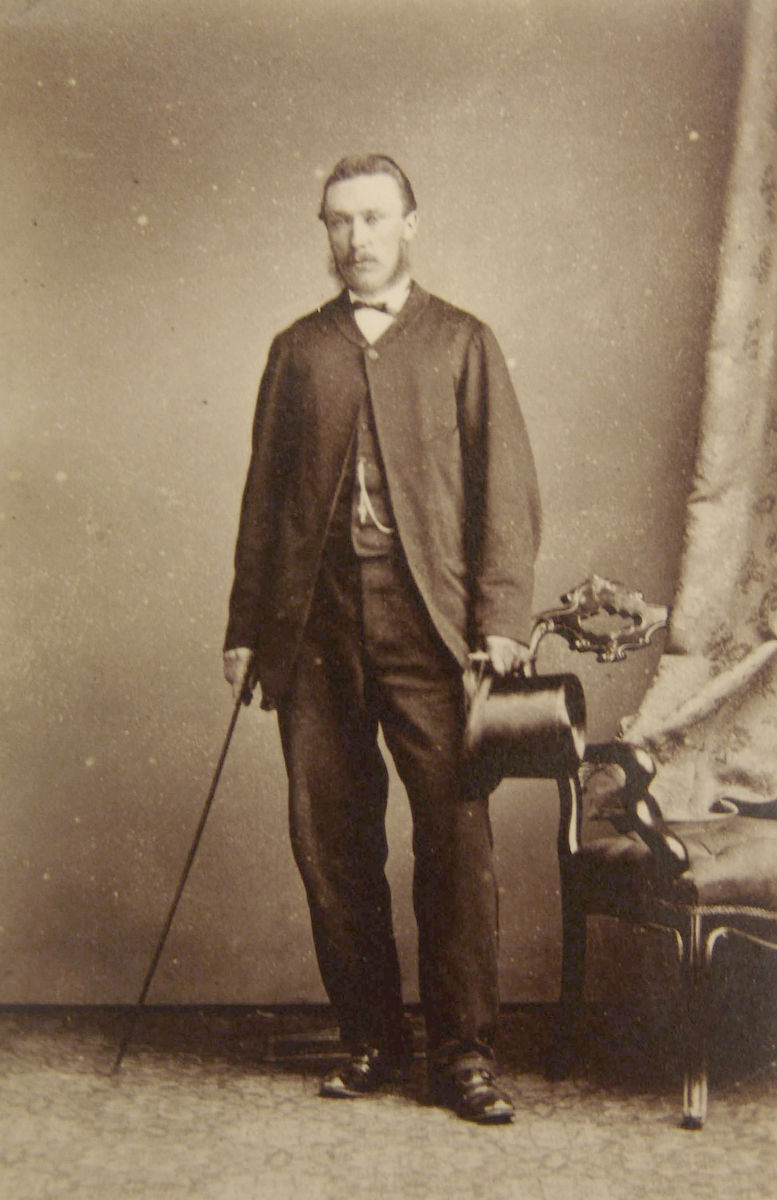
Lyne as a young man (c. 1860s)

Lyne was born at Great Swanport, Van Diemen's Land (what is now Swansea, Tasmania). He was the eldest son of John Lyne, a pastoral farmer who would serve in the Tasmanian House of Assembly from 1880 to 1893. He was educated at Horton College, Ross, and subsequently by a private tutor.

== Grazier ==
In the mid 1860s, he left Tasmania at 20 to take up land in northern Queensland. He journeyed with Henry Steiglitz and camped on the Gregory River before heading to George Sutherland's Rocklands lease on the Georgina River. At this place, Lyne participated in a skirmish with the local Aboriginal people.

Sutherland, with the assistance of Lyne, resorted to force to dispossess the Aboriginal inhabitants of a nearby creek, writing that:

"Lyne and Steiglitz were camped for some time with their sheep...looking for country to take up. Noticing several blacks’ fires near us, we deemed it fully time to make a raid, and drive them back. Mr Lyne and myself made for the fires, and before reaching them we met a large mob of the niggers...as the darkies advanced...we were prepared to stand our ground and fight the battle out...one of our party raised his carbine [and] fired, and [they] all fled back for their lives, but to frighten them we kept trotting behind them to give them a further scare and make them understand we were their masters".

Flood, drought and the cost of transportation of wool forced the pastoralists to leave the Georgina River leaseholds by 1869.

Lyne returned to Tasmania a year later and became a clerk at Glamorgan Council. After 10 years, Lyne left for the mainland again in 1875 and took up land at Cumberoona near Albury, New South Wales.

== New South Wales politics ==
Lyne c. 1885

Lyne was the member for Hume in the New South Wales Legislative Assembly from 1880. A Protectionist, he was Secretary for Public Works in 1885 and from 1886 to 1887 and Secretary for Lands in 1889. From 1891 to 1894, he became Secretary for Public Works again in the third ministry of George Dibbs. Lyne was a strong protectionist and fought hard for a high tariff. He also strongly supported railway expansion and pressed on with the building of the Culcairn to Corowa line in his own electorate.

George Reid won the 1895 election on behalf of free traders, and Lyne became Leader of the Opposition as Dibbs had lost his seat. In September 1898 Lyne vacated the leadership of the opposition to Edmund Barton on the latter's entry into parliament. But within twelve months the fracturing of George Reid's free trade government by the issue of Federation made possible a protectionist minority government as long as Lyne replaced Barton, and accordingly Lyne resumed leadership of protectionists in August 1899. Lyne was hastened into the premiership by scandal. Reid had entrusted John Cash Neild with a preparation of a report upon old age pensions, and he had promised the leader of the Labor Party that he would give Neild no payment for this without the sanction of Parliament. Finding that the work was much greater than he expected, Neild had asked for and obtained an advance in anticipation of a vote. Lyne, by a clever amendment of a vote of want of confidence, made it practically impossible for the Labor party to support Reid, thus aligning the Labor Party who held the balance of power against Reid. Lyne became Premier by agreeing to reforms proposed by the Labor Party. Lyne promised the Labor Party specific reforms and he passed 85 Acts between July and December 1900, including early closing of retail shops, coal mines regulation and miners' accident relief, old-age pensions and graduated death duties.

In the constitutional debates of the 1890s Lyne favoured unification of the Australian colonies over their federation. He was one of the representatives of New South Wales at the 1897-8 convention, and sat on its finance committee, but was absent from 49 percent of its divisions, the worst record of any delegate but one. He publicly advocated No in the referendum of 1898, and in the second referendum of 1899, the only New South Wales convention representative still dissatisfied with the amended bill. George Reid, the premier, had declared himself whole-heartedly on the side of federation, and the second referendum showed a substantial majority on the "Yes" side. Lyne protested the contamination of the result by ballot fraud, but soon reconciled himself to the new political reality.

== Federal politics ==
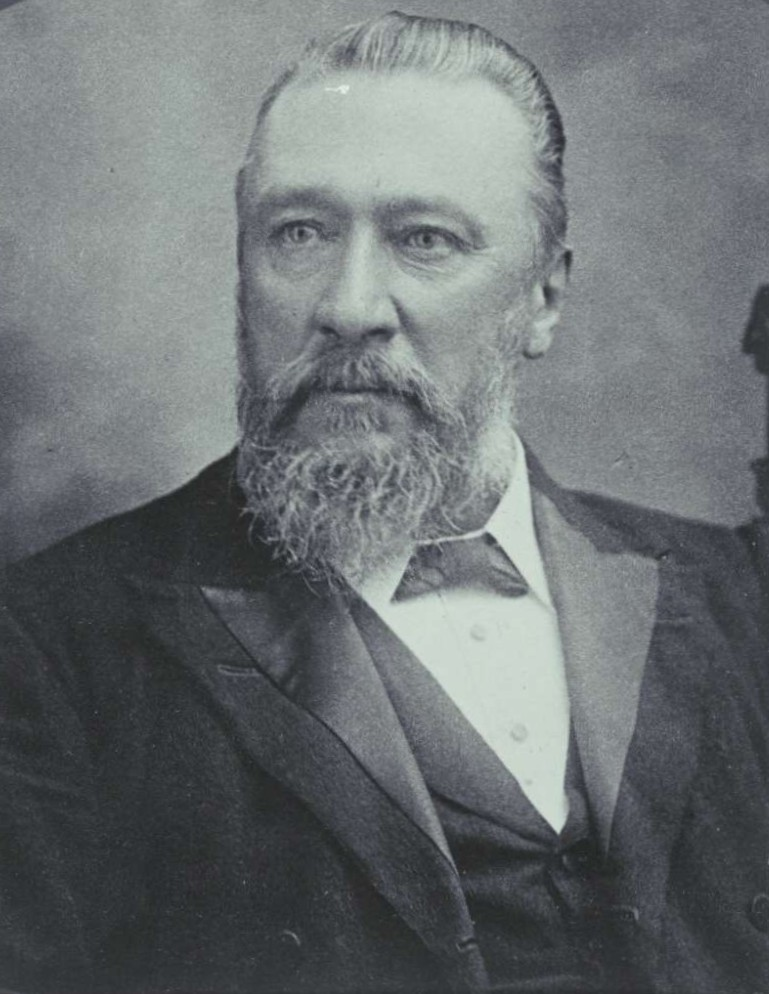
William Lyne at the 1898 Australasian Federal Convention

As Premier of the largest colony, Lyne considered himself entitled to be the first Prime Minister of Australia when the colonies federated in January 1901. This was in accordance with the precedent established at Canadian Confederation three decades earlier.

The Governor-General, Lord Hopetoun, was also of this mind, and offered the post to Lyne in December 1900, heading an interim government that would serve until the first federal election. However, since Lyne had opposed federation, most senior politicians, notably Alfred Deakin, told Hopetoun that they would not serve under Lyne. When it was apparent that Lyne would not be able to form a government, he returned his commission to Hopetoun. Eventually, Hopetoun was forced to accept the majority view that Edmund Barton, the leader of the federation movement, should be prime minister. Lyne's failure to form a government is known as the "Hopetoun Blunder."

Lyne became Minister for Home Affairs in Barton's cabinet on 1 January 1901 and was elected to the first federal Parliament as member for the Division of Hume in March 1901. He was responsible for the Commonwealth Franchise Act 1902 (preceded the Commonwealth Electoral Act), including the introduction of women's suffrage and the establishment of the Commonwealth Public Service. He remained Minister for Home Affairs until Charles Kingston left the cabinet, and became Minister for Trade and Customs in his stead on 7 August 1903. He retained this position when Deakin became prime minister towards the end of September. The general election held in December 1903 resulted in the return of three nearly equal parties, and Deakin was forced to resign in April 1904 but came back into power in July 1905 with Lyne in his old position.

In April 1907 Lyne accompanied Deakin to the colonial conference and endeavoured to persuade the British politicians that they were foolish in clinging to their policy of free trade. Deakin and Lyne returned to Australia in June, and when Sir John Forrest resigned his position as Treasurer at the end of July 1907, Lyne succeeded him.

Lyne was given charge of the legislation implementing Deakin's New Protection policy, which sought to link government support for industry with "fair and reasonable" wages. His name is associated with the 'Lyne Tariff'— the Customs Tariff Act 1908—which significantly increased levels of protection for local industry. It represented the final triumph of politicians favouring protection, over those advocating free trade, and brought to an end the main political divergence of pre-Federation Australia.

== Fusion government ==
In November 1908, the Labor party withdrew its support from Deakin, and Fisher succeeded him and held office until June 1909, when Deakin and Cook joined forces and formed the so-called "Fusion" government. Lyne accused Deakin of betrayal and thereafter sat as an independent Protectionist. His bitter denunciations of his one-time friend continued during the 11 months the ministry lasted but Deakin did not respond. The Labor Party came in with a large majority in the April 1910 election, and Lyne was elected as a pro-Labor independent. However, Lyne lost his seat in the May 1913 election when the Labor Party lost to the opposition Commonwealth Liberal Party.

== Personal life ==
Following the death of his first wife Martha née Shaw, Lyne remarried in 1911, to Sarah Jane Olden.

Sir William Lyne died in the Sydney suburb of Double Bay, in 1913. He was survived by one son and three daughters of the first marriage and by his second wife and her daughter. On 8 April 1960, Sarah, Lady Lyne presented a lithograph portraying the opening of the first Federal Parliament to the then newly opened Lyneham High School. Lady Lyne died in Canberra in 1961 and is buried in Woden Cemetery.

== Assessment ==
The 1949 Dictionary of Australian Biography assessed Lyne as:

Lyne was more of a politician than a statesman, always inclined to take a somewhat narrow view of politics. He did some good work when Premier of New South Wales by putting through the Early Closing bill (regulating shopping hours), the Industrial Arbitration bill, and bringing in graduated death duties; but even these measures were part of his bargain with the Labor party.

He was tall and vigorous, in his younger days a typical Australian bushman. He knew everyone in his electorate and was a good friend to all. He was bluff and frank and it was said of him that he was a man whose hand went instinctively into his pocket when any appeal was made to him. In Parliament, he was courageous and a vigorous administrator.

Scarcely an orator, he was a good tactician. Although overshadowed by greater men like Barton, Reid and Deakin, his views had much influence in his time. In his early political life he was a great advocate of irrigation, and in federal politics he had much to do with the shaping of the policy of protection eventually adopted by the Commonwealth.

His reputation has been sullied by Alfred Deakin's description of him as "a crude, sleek, suspicious, blundering, short-sighted, backblocks politician".

Lyne was also largely responsible for pushing through Parliament the bounty scheme that brought the Thylacine (Tasmanian tiger) to its extinction. In extensive reviews of the bounty scheme payments and official sheep farming records, Lyne's insistence of the threat posed by the native marsupial to sheep seems to have been largely at odds with the facts.

== Honours ==
Lyne was created a Knight Commander of the Order of St Michael and St George (KCMG) in 1900. The Federal electoral Division of Lyne and the Canberra suburb of Lyneham are named after him.

== See also ==
- Australian Commonwealth ministries 1901-2004

New South Wales Legislative Assembly
Preceded by George Day	Member for Hume; 1880–1901; With: Levin/Hayes/none	Succeeded by Gordon McLaurin
Political offices
Preceded by Henry Badgery	Secretary for Public Works; 1885	Succeeded by Jacob Garrard
Preceded by Jacob Garrard	Secretary for Public Works; 1886–1887	Succeeded by John Sutherland
Preceded by James Brunker	Secretary for Lands; 1889	Succeeded by James Brunker
Preceded by James Young	Secretary for Public Works; 1891–1894	Succeeded by James Young
Preceded by George Reid	Premier of New South Wales; 1899–1901	Succeeded by Sir John See
Preceded by Joseph Carruthers	Colonial Treasurer of New South Wales; 1899–1901	Succeeded by Thomas Waddell
Parliament of Australia
New division	Member for Hume; 1901–1913	Succeeded by Robert Patten
Political offices
New title	Minister for Home Affairs; 1901–1903	Succeeded by John Forrest
Preceded by Charles Kingston	Minister for Trade and Customs; 1903–1904	Succeeded by Andrew Fisher
Preceded by Allan McLean	Minister for Trade and Customs; 1905–1907	Succeeded by Austin Chapman
Preceded by Sir John Forrest	Treasurer of Australia; 1907–1908	Succeeded by Andrew Fisher
