= Morris Asher =

English-born Australian politician

Morris Asher (3 June 1818 – 29 October 1909) was an English-born Australian politician.

He was born in Hackney to Isaac Benjamin and Mary Asher. He migrated to Sydney in 1839 and ran general stores first near Young and then at Grenfell. He then migrated to New Zealand, running a store at Wellington before moving back to New South Wales in 1846 and settling at Albury. In 1846 he married Rebecca Levey, with whom he had ten children. In 1859 he was elected to the New South Wales Legislative Assembly for Hume, but he was defeated in 1860. Already owning three hotels, a general store, a flour mill and a boiling-down works at Albury, he opened a further store on the Lachlan goldfields and in the 1870s was an appraiser for Crown Lands. Later an auctioneer in Sydney, Asher died at Potts Point in 1909.

New South Wales Legislative Assembly
New seat	Member for Hume; 1859–1860	Succeeded by Thomas Mate
