= George Day (Australian politician) =

Australian politician

George Day (29 October 1826 – 13 July 1906) was an Australian politician. He was born in the Hawkesbury River district of New South Wales on 29 October 1826.

He was elected from 1874 to 1880 as a member of the New South Wales Legislative Assembly, for the electoral district of Hume, and elected from 1880 to 1889 for the electoral district of Albury.

He then served from 1889 to 1906 in the New South Wales Legislative Council.

He died at Petersham in Sydney on 13 July 1906.

New South Wales Legislative Assembly
Preceded by Thomas Robertson	Member for Hume; 1874 – 1880	Succeeded by William Lyne
Preceded by New Creation	Member for Albury; 1880 – 1889	Succeeded by John Wilkinson
