= Electoral district of Hume =

Former state electoral district of New South Wales, Australia

Hume was an electoral district of the Legislative Assembly in the Australian state of New South Wales established in 1859 in the Albury area, named after Hamilton Hume. It did not include the town of Albury after the creation of the electoral district of Albury in 1880. From 1880 to 1894, it elected two members. Following federation, the 1903 NSW referendum decided that the Legislative was to be reduced from 125 to 90 members and in 1904 Hume was abolished and partly replaced by Corowa with the balance absorbed into Albury.

== Members for Hume ==
Single-member (1859–1880)
Member	Party	Term			
Morris Asher	None	1859–1860			
Thomas Mate	None	1860–1869			
James Fallon	None	1869–1872			
James McLaurin	None	1872–1873			
Thomas Robertson	None	1873–1874			
George Day	None	1874–1880			
Two members (1880–1894)
Member	Party	Term	Member	Party	Term
William Lyne	None	1880–1887	Leyser Levin	None	1880–1885
William Lyne	None	1880–1887	James Hayes	None	1885–1887
William Lyne	Protectionist	1887–1894	James Hayes	Protectionist	1887–1894
Single-member (1894–1904)
Member	Party	Term			
William Lyne	Protectionist	1894–1901			
Gordon McLaurin	Progressive	1901–1904			

== Election results ==
1901 New South Wales state election: The Hume
Party	Candidate	Votes	%	±%
Progressive	Gordon McLaurin	unopposed		
Progressive hold				

Sir William Lyne (Progressive) resigned prior to the federal election in March 1901 at which he successfully contested the seat of Hume. Having resigned earlier than other candidates, a by-election was held in April 1901 in which Gordon McLaurin retained the seat for the Progressive Party.
