= Electoral results for the district of Mudgee =

Election results for Mudgee, New South Wales, Australia

Mudgee, an electoral district of the Legislative Assembly in the Australian state of New South Wales had two incarnation, from 1859 to 1920 and from 1927 to 1968.

Election	Member	Party				
1859	Lyttleton Bayley	None				
1859 by	Samuel Terry	None				
1860	Samuel Terry	None				
1864	Samuel Terry	None				
1869	Henry Stephen	None				
1872 by	Henry Parkes	None				
1872	Joseph Innes	None				
1873 by	Joseph O'Connor	None				
1874	Stephen Goold	None				
1876 by	Richard Rouse	None				
1877	John Robertson	None				
1879 by	Richard Rouse	None				
1879 re-count	David Buchanan	None	Member	Party	Member	Party
1880	David Buchanan	None	Samuel Terry	None	Louis Beyers	None
1882 by	David Buchanan	None	John Robertson	None	Louis Beyers	None
1882	David Buchanan	None	John Robertson	None	Adolphus Taylor	None
1883 by	David Buchanan	None	John Robertson	None	Adolphus Taylor	None
1885	Thomas Browne	None	John Robertson	None	Adolphus Taylor	None
1886 by	Thomas Browne	None	William Wall	None	Adolphus Taylor	None
1887	Reginald Black	Free Trade	William Wall	Protectionist	Adolphus Taylor	None
1887 by	Reginald Black	Free Trade	William Wall	Protectionist	John Haynes	Free Trade
1891	Robert Jones	Ind. Free Trade	William Wall	Protectionist	John Haynes	Ind. Free Trade
1894	Robert Jones	Free Trade				
1895	Robert Jones	Free Trade				
1898	Edwin Richards	Protectionist				
1901	Edwin Richards	Progressive				
1904	Edwin Richards	Progressive				
1907	Robert Jones	Liberal Reform				
1910	Bill Dunn	Labor				
1911 by	Bill Dunn	Labor				
1913	Bill Dunn	Labor				
1917	Bill Dunn	Labor				
Election	Member	Party				
1927	Bill Dunn	Labor				
1930	Bill Dunn	Labor				
1932	David Spring	Country				
1935	Bill Dunn	Labor (NSW)				
1938	Bill Dunn	Labor				
1941	Bill Dunn	Labor				
1944	Bill Dunn	Labor				
1947	Bill Dunn	Labor				
1950	Frederick Cooke	Country				
1953	Leo Nott	Labor				
1956	Leo Nott	Labor				
1959	Leo Nott	Labor				
1962	Leo Nott	Labor				
1965	Leo Nott	Labor				

== Election results ==
=== Elections in the 1960s ===
==== 1965 ====
1965 New South Wales state election: Mudgee
Party	Candidate	Votes	%	±%
Labor	Leo Nott	8,115	50.6	−3.3
Liberal	Richard Evans	4,509	28.1	+2.4
Country	Emile Moufarrige	3,423	21.3	+3.0
Total formal votes		16,047	98.9	+0.4
Informal votes		184	1.1	−0.4
Turnout		16,231	96.0	+0.6
Two-party-preferred result
Labor	Leo Nott	8,355	52.1	−3.5
Liberal	Richard Evans	7,692	47.9	+3.5
Labor hold		Swing	−3.5	

==== 1962 ====
1962 New South Wales state election: Mudgee
Party	Candidate	Votes	%	±%
Labor	Leo Nott	8,772	53.9	+4.6
Liberal	Albert Cox	4,187	25.7	−0.6
Country	Edward Punch	2,988	18.3	−3.9
Democratic Labor	Edward Byrnes	334	2.1	−0.1
Total formal votes		16,281	98.5	
Informal votes		247	1.5	
Turnout		16,528	95.4	
Two-party-preferred result
Labor	Leo Nott	9,048	55.6	+4.7
Liberal	Albert Cox	7,233	44.4	−4.7
Labor hold		Swing	+4.7	

=== Elections in the 1950s ===
==== 1959 ====
1959 New South Wales state election: Mudgee
Party	Candidate	Votes	%	±%
Labor	Leo Nott	7,929	49.3	
Liberal	Jack Ives	4,221	26.3	
Country	Norman Griffith	3,576	22.2	
Democratic Labor	Donald Bennett	347	2.2	
Total formal votes		16,073	98.8	
Informal votes		198	1.2	
Turnout		16,271	95.4	
Two-party-preferred result
Labor	Leo Nott	8,174	50.9	
Liberal	Jack Ives	7,899	49.1	
Labor hold		Swing		

==== 1956 ====
1956 New South Wales state election: Mudgee
Party	Candidate	Votes	%	±%
Labor	Leo Nott	8,220	50.7	−2.3
Liberal	Eric Hennessy	4,650	28.7	+28.7
Country	Kenneth Masters	3,343	20.6	−26.4
Total formal votes		16,213	99.0	+0.6
Informal votes		160	1.0	−0.6
Turnout		16,373	94.2	−0.8
Two-party-preferred result
Labor	Leo Nott	8,554	52.8	−0.2
Liberal	Eric Hennessy	7,659	47.2	+0.2
Labor hold		Swing	−0.2	

==== 1953 ====
1953 New South Wales state election: Mudgee
Party	Candidate	Votes	%	±%
Labor	Leo Nott	8,817	53.0	
Country	Frederick Cooke	7,818	47.0	
Total formal votes		16,635	98.4	
Informal votes		262	1.6	
Turnout		16,897	95.0	
Labor gain from Country		Swing		

==== 1950 ====
1950 New South Wales state election: Mudgee
Party	Candidate	Votes	%	±%
Labor	John Breen	7,128	45.9	
Country	Frederick Cooke	4,381	28.2	
Liberal	Norman Horne	4,019	25.9	
Total formal votes		15,528	98.9	
Informal votes		175	1.1	
Turnout		15,703	94.2	
Two-party-preferred result
Country	Frederick Cooke	8,122	52.3	
Labor	John Breen	7,406	47.7	
Country gain from Labor		Swing		

=== Elections in the 1940s ===
==== 1947 ====
1947 New South Wales state election: Mudgee
Party	Candidate	Votes	%	±%
Labor	Bill Dunn	6,487	55.0	−8.0
Country	Frederick Cooke	5,298	45.0	+45.0
Total formal votes		11,785	99.2	+1.1
Informal votes		96	0.8	−1.1
Turnout		11,881	95.5	+4.2
Labor hold		Swing	N/A	

==== 1944 ====
1944 New South Wales state election: Mudgee
Party	Candidate	Votes	%	±%
Labor	Bill Dunn	6,967	63.0	−6.4
Independent	Frederick Cooke	3,304	29.9	−0.7
Independent	Kevin Nott	788	7.1	+7.1
Total formal votes		11,059	98.1	−0.8
Informal votes		209	1.9	+0.8
Turnout		11,268	91.3	−2.9
Labor hold		Swing	N/A	

- Preferences were not distributed.

==== 1941 ====
1941 New South Wales state election: Mudgee
Party	Candidate	Votes	%	±%
Labor	Bill Dunn	8,771	69.4	
Independent	Frederick Cooke	3,877	30.6	
Total formal votes		12,648	98.9	
Informal votes		143	1.1	
Turnout		12,791	94.2	
Labor hold		Swing		

=== Elections in the 1930s ===
==== 1938 ====
1938 New South Wales state election: Mudgee
Party	Candidate	Votes	%	±%
Labor	Bill Dunn	8,587	60.5	+7.8
Country	Eric Pye	3,279	23.1	−24.2
Country	Reginald Wilson	2,320	16.3	+16.3
Total formal votes		14,186	98.4	−1.0
Informal votes		229	1.6	+1.0
Turnout		14,415	96.4	−1.0
Labor hold		Swing	N/A	

- Preferences were not distributed.

==== 1935 ====
1935 New South Wales state election: Mudgee
Party	Candidate	Votes	%	±%
Labor (NSW)	Bill Dunn (defeated)	7,598	52.7	+5.5
Country	David Spring	6,818	47.3	−5.2
Total formal votes		14,416	99.4	+0.3
Informal votes		91	0.6	−0.3
Turnout		14,507	97.4	+0.5
Labor (NSW) gain from Country		Swing	N/A	

==== 1932 ====
1932 New South Wales state election: Mudgee
Party	Candidate	Votes	%	±%
Country	David Spring	6,956	52.5	+14.1
Labor (NSW)	Bill Dunn	6,248	47.2	−13.8
Communist	James Terry	43	0.3	−0.3
Total formal votes		13,247	99.1	0.0
Informal votes		114	0.9	0.0
Turnout		13,361	96.9	+0.9
Country gain from Labor (NSW)		Swing	N/A	

- David Spring was jointly endorsed by the UAP and Country Party. In parliament, he caucused with the Country party.

==== 1930 ====
1930 New South Wales state election: Mudgee
Party	Candidate	Votes	%	±%
Labor	Bill Dunn	7,538	61.0	
Country	Gordon Wilkins	4,741	38.4	
Communist	Patrick Walsh	76	0.6	
Total formal votes		12,355	99.1	
Informal votes		109	0.9	
Turnout		12,464	96.0	
Labor hold		Swing		

=== Elections in the 1920s ===
==== 1927 ====
1927 New South Wales state election: Mudgee
Party	Candidate	Votes	%	±%
Labor	Bill Dunn	6,948	54.1	
Country	Gordon Wilkins	5,904	45.9	
Total formal votes		12,852	99.4	
Informal votes		79	0.6	
Turnout		12,931	88.9	
Labor win		(new seat)		

==== 1920 - 1927 ====
District abolished

=== Elections in the 1910s ===
==== 1917 ====
1917 New South Wales state election: Mudgee
Party	Candidate	Votes	%	±%
Labor	Bill Dunn	unopposed		
Labor hold				

==== 1913 ====
1913 New South Wales state election: Mudgee
Party	Candidate	Votes	%	±%
Labor	Bill Dunn	4,127	52.8	
Liberal Reform	Owen Gilbert	3,696	47.2	
Total formal votes		7,823	97.7	
Informal votes		182	2.3	
Turnout		8,005	82.2	
Labor hold				

==== 1911 by-election ====
1911 Mudgee by-election Wednesday 16 August
Party	Candidate	Votes	%	±%
Labor	Bill Dunn (re-elected)	3,173	51.6	−1.6
Liberal Reform	Owen Gilbert	2,975	48.4	+1.6
Total formal votes		6,148	100.0	+1.0
Informal votes		0	0.0	−1.0
Turnout		6,148	72.7 (Note: Estimate based on a roll of 8,458 at the 1910 election.)	−5.3
Labor hold		Swing	−1.6	

Bill Dunn (Labor) resigned in protest over land legislation.

==== 1910 ====
1910 New South Wales state election: Mudgee
Party	Candidate	Votes	%	±%
Labour	Bill Dunn	3,476	53.2	+10.6
Liberal Reform	Robert Jones (defeated)	3,052	46.8	−6.9
Total formal votes		6,528	99.0	+1.7
Informal votes		69	1.0	−1.7
Turnout		6,597	78.0	+4.8
Labour gain from Liberal Reform				

=== Elections in the 1900s ===
==== 1907 ====
1907 New South Wales state election: Mudgee
Party	Candidate	Votes	%	±%
Liberal Reform	Robert Jones	3,045	53.7	
Labour	James Morrish	2,417	42.6	
Independent	William Wall	211	3.7	
Total formal votes		5,673	97.3	
Informal votes		156	2.7	
Turnout		5,829	73.2	
Liberal Reform gain from Progressive				

==== 1904 ====
1904 New South Wales state election: Mudgee
Party	Candidate	Votes	%	±%
Progressive	Edwin Richards	2,731	50.1	
Liberal Reform	John Haynes	2,717	49.9	
Total formal votes		5,448	99.4	
Informal votes		33	0.6	
Turnout		5,481	70.7	
Progressive hold				

Mudgee was expanded to include part of the abolished seat of Wellington. The member for Mudgee was Edwin Richards (Progressive) and the member for Wellington was John Haynes (Liberal Reform).

==== 1901 ====
1901 New South Wales state election: Mudgee
Party	Candidate	Votes	%	±%
Progressive	Edwin Richards	1,318	54.4	+4.3
Liberal Reform	Robert Jones	1,104	45.6	−4.3
Total formal votes		2,422	99.4	+0.3
Informal votes		15	0.6	−0.3
Turnout		2,437	74.0	+5.9
Progressive hold				

=== Elections in the 1890s ===
==== 1898 ====
1898 New South Wales colonial election: Mudgee
Party	Candidate	Votes	%	±%
National Federal	Edwin Richards	1,065	50.1	
Free Trade	Robert Jones	1,059	49.9	
Total formal votes		2,124	99.1	
Informal votes		20	0.9	
Turnout		2,144	68.1	
National Federal gain from Free Trade				

==== 1895 ====
1895 New South Wales colonial election: Mudgee
Party	Candidate	Votes	%	±%
Free Trade	Robert Jones	971	55.8	
Protectionist	J McEwen	768	44.2	
Total formal votes		1,739	99.2	
Informal votes		14	0.8	
Turnout		1,753	69.2	
Free Trade hold				

==== 1894 ====
1894 New South Wales colonial election: Mudgee
Party	Candidate	Votes	%	±%
Free Trade	Robert Jones	1,085	56.8	
Protectionist	Richard Rouse	749	39.2	
Labour	J M Appleyard	65	3.4	
Independent	J Scully	10	0.5	
Ind. Protectionist	W Logan	3	0.2	
Total formal votes		1,912	93.6	
Informal votes		131	6.4	
Turnout		2,043	79.9	
Free Trade win		(previously 3 members)		

==== 1891 ====
1891 New South Wales colonial election: Mudgee Monday 22 June
Party	Candidate	Votes	%	±%
Ind. Free Trade	John Haynes (re-elected 1)	1,521	21.0	
Protectionist	William Wall (re-elected 2)	1,343	18.5	
Ind. Free Trade	Robert Jones (elected 3)	1,290	17.8	
Free Trade	Reginald Black (defeated)	1,218	16.8	
Protectionist	George Waldron	1,049	14.5	
Labour	James Cook	836	11.5	
Total formal votes		7,257	99.6	
Informal votes		27	0.4	
Turnout		2,797	68.5	
Member changed to Ind. Free Trade from Free Trade				
Protectionist hold 1				
Ind. Free Trade gain 1 from Free Trade				

John Haynes and Robert Jones whilst Free Traders, did not support the Free Trade government of Sir Henry Parkes.

=== Elections in the 1880s ===
==== 1889 ====
1889 New South Wales colonial election: Mudgee Saturday 9 February
Party	Candidate	Votes	%	±%
Free Trade	Reginald Black (elected 1)	1,338	18.5	
Protectionist	William Wall (elected 2)	1,302	18.0	
Free Trade	John Haynes (elected 3)	1,206	16.7	
Protectionist	G Townsend	1,177	16.3	
Free Trade	Dr Kelly	1,112	15.4	
Protectionist	Thomas Browne	1,098	15.2	
Total formal votes		7,233	99.7	
Informal votes		25	0.3	
Turnout		2,509	63.1	
Free Trade hold 2				
Protectionist hold 1				

Thomas Browne (Protectionist) was a sitting member for Wentworth.

==== 1887 by-election ====
1887 Mudgee by-election Friday 6 May
Party	Candidate	Votes	%	±%
Free Trade	John Haynes (elected)	1,025	54.5	
Protectionist	John Carden	855	45.5	
Total formal votes		1,880	100.0	
Informal votes		0	0.0	
Turnout		1,880	47.8	
Free Trade hold				

Adolphus Taylor (Free Trade) resigned to become the Examiner of Patents.

==== 1887 ====
1887 New South Wales colonial election: Mudgee Tuesday 15 February
Party	Candidate	Votes	%	±%
Free Trade	Adolphus Taylor (re-elected 1)	1,219	20.2	
Protectionist	William Wall (re-elected 2)	1,071	17.8	
Free Trade	Reginald Black (elected 3)	1,056	17.5	
Protectionist	Richard Rouse	990	16.4	
Free Trade	John Haynes	884	14.7	
Protectionist	John Carden	805	13.4	
Total formal votes		6,025	99.3	
Informal votes		40	0.7	
Turnout		2,231	56.7	

Thomas Browne unsuccessfully contested Wentworth.

==== 1886 by-election ====
1886 Mudgee by-election Tuesday 29 June
Candidate	Votes	%
William Wall (elected)	unopposed	

John Robertson resigned.

==== 1885 ====
1885 New South Wales colonial election: Mudgee Friday 23 October
Candidate	Votes	%
Sir John Robertson (re-elected 1)	1,628	29.5
Adolphus Taylor (re-elected 2)	1,583	28.7
Thomas Browne (elected 3)	1,178	21.4
John Hurley	567	10.3
Louis Beyers	562	10.2
Total formal votes	5,518	99.6
Informal votes	22	0.4
Turnout	2,065	51.3

==== 1883 by-election ====
1883 Mudgee by-election Tuesday 13 March
Candidate	Votes	%
Adolphus Taylor (elected)	1,289	66.6
John McElhone	645	33.4
Total formal votes	1,934	100.0
Informal votes	0	0.0
Turnout	1,934	38.6

Adolphus Taylor resigned after a challenge by John McElhone.

==== 1882 ====
1882 New South Wales colonial election: Mudgee Monday 11 December
Candidate	Votes	%
Adolphus Taylor (elected 1)	1,976	32.3
John Robertson (re-elected 2)	1,256	20.5
David Buchanan (re-elected 3)	1,154	18.8
Thomas Browne	1,104	18.0
George Davidson	637	10.4
Total formal votes	6,127	99.7
Informal votes	21	0.3
Turnout	2,445	49.1

==== 1882 by-election ====
1882 Mudgee by-election Friday 13 January
Candidate	Votes	%
John Robertson (elected)	unopposed	

==== 1880 ====
1880 New South Wales colonial election: Mudgee Wednesday 1 December
Candidate	Votes	%
Samuel Terry (re-elected 1)	1,790	25.0
Louis Beyers (re-elected 2)	1,754	24.5
David Buchanan (re-elected 3)	1,492	20.8
Joseph O'Connor	1,063	14.9
Total formal votes	1,059	100.0
Informal votes	7,158	0.0
Turnout	7,158	53.7
	(2 new seats)	

The sitting member David Buchanan had already unsuccessfully contested West Sydney. Samuel Terry was the member for New England and Louis Beyers was the member for the abolished district of Goldfields West.

=== Elections in the 1870s ===
==== 1879 re-count ====
1879 Mudgee election re-count Thursday 20 March
Candidate	Votes	%
David Buchanan (elected)	N/A	
Richard Rouse (defeated)	N/A	

The Committee of Elections and Qualifications overturned the election of Richard Rouse and declared that David Buchanan was elected as the member for Mudgee.

==== 1879 by-election ====
1879 Mudgee by-election Monday 6 January
Candidate	Votes	%
Richard Rouse (elected)	895	50.03
David Buchanan	894	49.97
Total formal votes	1,789	100.0
Informal votes	0	0.0
Turnout	1,789	43.6

Sir John Robertson resigned to be appointed to the Legislative Council.

==== 1877 ====
1877 New South Wales colonial election: Mudgee Monday 5 November
Candidate	Votes	%
Sir John Robertson (elected)	1,142	53.7
Richard Rouse (defeated)	985	46.3
Total formal votes	2,127	100.0
Informal votes	0	0.0
Turnout	2,130	44.4

==== 1876 by-election ====
1876 Mudgee by-election Thursday 5 October
Candidate	Votes	%
Richard Rouse (elected)	1,360	54.6
William Pigott	1,129	45.4
Total formal votes	2,4890	100.0
Informal votes	0	0.00
Turnout	2,489	49.0

Stephen Goold died.

==== 1874 ====
1874–75 New South Wales colonial election: Mudgee Wednesday 23 December 1874
Candidate	Votes	%
Stephen Goold (elected)	1,660	56.6
Patrick Jennings	1,271	43.4
Total formal votes	2,931	100.0
Informal votes	0	0.0
Turnout	2,930	49.6

==== 1873 by-election ====
1873 Mudgee by-election Monday 8 September
Candidate	Votes	%
Joseph O'Connor (elected)	1,618	40.0
Walter Church	995	24.6
Alfred O'Connor	881	21.8
John Scully	556	13.7
Total formal votes	4,050	100.0
Informal votes	0	0.0
Turnout	4,050	45.8

Joseph Innes was appointed to the Legislative Council.

==== 1872 ====
1872 New South Wales colonial election: Mudgee Thursday 7 March
Candidate	Votes	%
Joseph Innes (elected)	833	59.8
Joseph O'Connor	559	40.2
Total formal votes	1,392	100.0
Informal votes	0	0.0
Turnout	1,392	50.9

==== 1872 by-election ====
1872 Mudgee by-election Tuesday 2 January
Candidate	Votes	%
Henry Parkes (elected)	848	64.6
Joseph O'Connor	465	35.4
Total formal votes	1,313	100.0
Informal votes	0	0.0
Turnout	1,313	48.0

Henry Stephen resigned.

=== Elections in the 1860s ===
==== 1869 ====
1869–70 New South Wales colonial election: Mudgee Thursday 16 December 1869
Candidate	Votes	%
Henry Stephen (elected)	760	59.0
Samuel Terry (defeated)	529	41.0
Total formal votes	1,289	100.0
Informal votes	0	0.0
Turnout	1,289	53.8

==== 1864 ====
1864–65 New South Wales colonial election: Mudgee Saturday 24 December 1864
Candidate	Votes	%
Samuel Terry (re-elected)	583	57.1
Joseph Innes	438	42.9
Total formal votes	1,021	100.0
Informal votes	0	0.0
Turnout	1,021	52.6

==== 1860 ====
1860 New South Wales colonial election: Mudgee Saturday 15 December 1860
Candidate	Votes	%
Samuel Terry (re-elected)	547	86.0
James Martin	89	14.0
Total formal votes	636	100.0
Informal votes	0	0.0
Turnout	636	26.0

=== Elections in the 1850s ===
==== 1859 by-election ====
1859 Mudgee by-election Monday 19 December
Candidate	Votes	%
Samuel Terry (elected)	342	47.6
T H Sinden	376	52.4
Total formal votes	718	100.0
Informal votes	0	0.0
Turnout	718	35.6

Lyttleton Bayley resigned.

==== 1859 ====
1859 New South Wales colonial election: Mudgee Saturday 18 June
Candidate	Votes	%
Lyttleton Bayley (elected)	524	68.8
Robert Lowe	238	31.2
Total formal votes	762	100.0
Informal votes	0	0.0
Turnout	762	37.8
