= Electoral results for the district of Wellington (New South Wales) =

Election results for Wellington, New South Wales, Australia

Wellington, an electoral district of the Legislative Assembly in the Australian state of New South Wales, was created in 1859 and abolished in 1904.

| Election | Member | Party |
|---|---|---|
| 1859 | Nicolas Hyeronimus | None |
| 1860 by | Silvanus Daniel | None |
| 1860 | Silvanus Daniel | None |
| 1862 by | Saul Samuel | None |
| 1864 | Saul Samuel | None |
| 1868 by | Saul Samuel | None |
| 1869 | Gerald Spring | None |
| 1872 | John Smith | None |
| 1875 | John Smith | None |
| 1877 | John Shepherd | None |
| 1880 | Edmund Barton | None |
| 1882 | David Ferguson | None |
| 1885 | David Ferguson | None |
| 1887 | David Ferguson | Protectionist |
| 1889 | David Ferguson | Protectionist |
| 1891 by | Thomas York | Protectionist |
| 1891 | Thomas York | Protectionist |
| 1894 | John Haynes | Free Trade |
| 1895 | John Haynes | Free Trade |
| 1898 | John Haynes | Free Trade |
| 1901 | John Haynes | Liberal Reform |

== Election results ==
=== Elections in the 1900s ===
==== 1901 ====
1901 New South Wales state election: Wellington
| Party | Candidate | Votes | % | ±% |
|---|---|---|---|---|
| Liberal Reform | John Haynes | 1,239 | 54.1 | −2.9 |
| Progressive | John McEwen | 1,053 | 45.9 | +2.9 |
| Total formal votes | | 2,292 | 100.0 | +1.5 |
| Informal votes | | 0 | 0.0 | −1.5 |
| Turnout | | 2,292 | 61.1 | −0.8 |
| Liberal Reform hold | | | | |

=== Elections in the 1890s ===
==== 1898 ====
1898 New South Wales colonial election: Wellington
| Party | Candidate | Votes | % | ±% |
|---|---|---|---|---|
| Free Trade | John Haynes | 1,026 | 57.0 | |
| National Federal | William Galloway | 775 | 43.0 | |
| Total formal votes | | 1,801 | 98.5 | |
| Informal votes | | 28 | 1.5 | |
| Turnout | | 1,829 | 61.9 | |
| Free Trade hold | | | | |

==== 1895 ====
1895 New South Wales colonial election: Wellington
| Party | Candidate | Votes | % | ±% |
|---|---|---|---|---|
| Free Trade | John Haynes | 1,035 | 60.9 | |
| Protectionist | Louis Veech | 666 | 39.2 | |
| Total formal votes | | 1,701 | 99.3 | |
| Informal votes | | 12 | 0.7 | |
| Turnout | | 1,713 | 66.2 | |
| Free Trade hold | | | | |

==== 1894 ====
1894 New South Wales colonial election: Wellington
| Party | Candidate | Votes | % | ±% |
|---|---|---|---|---|
| Free Trade | John Haynes | 831 | 40.8 | |
| Labour | Michael O'Halloran | 607 | 29.8 | |
| Protectionist | Thomas York | 580 | 28.5 | |
| Ind. Protectionist | H Boehme | 20 | 1.0 | |
| Total formal votes | | 2,038 | 98.0 | |
| Informal votes | | 41 | 2.0 | |
| Turnout | | 2,079 | 80.0 | |
| Free Trade gain from Protectionist | | | | |

==== 1891 ====
1891 New South Wales colonial election: Wellington Saturday 20 June
| Party | Candidate | Votes | % | ±% |
|---|---|---|---|---|
| Protectionist | Thomas York (re-elected) | 448 | 38.5 | |
| Protectionist | Thomas Quirk | 383 | 32.9 | |
| Labour | Michael O'Halloran | 332 | 28.6 | |
| Total formal votes | | 1,163 | 98.7 | |
| Informal votes | | 15 | 1.3 | |
| Turnout | | 1,178 | 71.0 | |
| Protectionist hold | | | | |

==== 1891 by-election ====
1891 Wellington by-election Friday 29 May
| Party | Candidate | Votes | % | ±% |
|---|---|---|---|---|
| Protectionist | Thomas York (elected) | 292 | 31.0 | |
| Protectionist | Thomas Quirk | 285 | 30.2 | |
| Labour | Michael O'Halloran | 221 | 23.4 | |
| Labour | Alexander Riddel | 145 | 15.4 | |
| Total formal votes | | 943 | 100.0 | +3.3 |
| Informal votes | | 0 | 0.0 | −3.3 |
| Turnout | | 943 | 58.5 | +1.9 |
| Protectionist hold | | | | |

David Ferguson (Protectionist) died.

=== Elections in the 1880s ===
==== 1889 ====
1889 New South Wales colonial election: Wellington Saturday 2 February
| Party | Candidate | Votes | % | ±% |
|---|---|---|---|---|
| Protectionist | David Ferguson (elected) | 454 | 53.4 | |
| Free Trade | H Montagu | 318 | 37.4 | |
| Protectionist | Michael O'Halloran | 78 | 9.2 | |
| Total formal votes | | 850 | 96.7 | |
| Informal votes | | 29 | 3.3 | |
| Turnout | | 879 | 56.6 | |
| Protectionist hold | | | | |

==== 1887 ====
1887 New South Wales colonial election: Wellington Saturday 19 February
| Party | Candidate | Votes | % | ±% |
|---|---|---|---|---|
| Protectionist | David Ferguson (re-elected) | 547 | 64.4 | |
| Free Trade | W J Hill | 303 | 35.7 | |
| Total formal votes | | 850 | 98.2 | |
| Informal votes | | 16 | 1.9 | |
| Turnout | | 866 | 64.5 | |

==== 1885 ====
1885 New South Wales colonial election: Wellington Tuesday 20 October
| Candidate | Votes | % |
|---|---|---|
| David Ferguson (re-elected) | 458 | 58.9 |
| Paddy Crick | 258 | 33.2 |
| E Bennett | 61 | 7.9 |
| Total formal votes | 777 | 98.6 |
| Informal votes | 11 | 1.4 |
| Turnout | 787 | 59.8 |

==== 1882 ====
1882 New South Wales colonial election: Wellington Monday 11 December
| Candidate | Votes | % |
|---|---|---|
| David Ferguson (elected) | 518 | 78.5 |
| William Shorter | 142 | 21.5 |
| Total formal votes | 660 | 96.5 |
| Informal votes | 24 | 3.5 |
| Turnout | 684 | 53.9 |

The sitting member Edmund Barton successfully contested East Sydney.

==== 1880 ====
1880 New South Wales colonial election: Wellington Monday 29 November
| Candidate | Votes | % |
|---|---|---|
| Edmund Barton (re-elected) | unopposed | |

The sitting member John Shepherd did not contest the election. Edmund Barton was the member for the abolished district of University of Sydney.

=== Elections in the 1870s ===
==== 1877 ====
1877 New South Wales colonial election: Wellington Friday 2 November
| Candidate | Votes | % |
|---|---|---|
| John Shepherd (elected) | 741 | 50.2 |
| Patrick Jennings | 595 | 40.3 |
| Thomas Wythes | 139 | 9.4 |
| Total formal votes | 1,475 | 99.4 |
| Informal votes | 9 | 0.6 |
| Turnout | 1,521 | 60.9 |

The sitting member was John Smith who unsuccessfully contested Nepean.

==== 1875 ====
1874–75 New South Wales colonial election: Wellington Thursday 7 January 1875
| Candidate | Votes | % |
|---|---|---|
| John Smith (re-elected) | 573 | 41.2 |
| Thomas Wythes | 524 | 37.7 |
| John Hurley (defeated) | 294 | 21.1 |
| Total formal votes | 1,391 | 98.3 |
| Informal votes | 24 | 1.7 |
| Turnout | 1,415 | 52.4 |

==== 1872 ====
1872 New South Wales colonial election: Wellington Wednesday 28 February
| Candidate | Votes | % |
|---|---|---|
| John Smith (elected) | 164 | 34.6 |
| George Stephen | 149 | 31.4 |
| Gerald Spring (defeated) | 100 | 21.1 |
| Andrew Ross | 61 | 12.9 |
| William Dalley | 0 | 0.0 |
| William Forlonge | 0 | 0.0 |
| Total formal votes | 474 | 100.0 |
| Informal votes | 0 | 0.0 |
| Turnout | 591 | 37.8 |

=== Elections in the 1860s ===
==== 1869 ====
1869–70 New South Wales colonial election: Wellington Tuesday 28 December 1869
| Candidate | Votes | % |
|---|---|---|
| Gerald Spring (elected) | 238 | 66.7 |
| Andrew Ross | 62 | 17.4 |
| Charles Blakefield | 57 | 16.0 |
| Total formal votes | 357 | 100.0 |
| Informal votes | 0 | 0.0 |
| Turnout | 357 | 26.5 |

==== 1868 by-election ====
1868 Wellington by-election Thursday 8 February
| Candidate | Votes | % |
|---|---|---|
| Saul Samuel (re-elected) | 173 | 68.9 |
| Philip Holdsworth | 78 | 31.1 |
| Total formal votes | 251 | 100.0 |
| Informal votes | 0 | 0.0 |
| Turnout | 251 | 20.5 |

Saul Samuel was appointed Colonial Treasurer in the second Robertson ministry.

==== 1864 ====
1864–65 New South Wales colonial election: Wellington Wednesday 21 December 1864
| Candidate | Votes | % |
|---|---|---|
| Saul Samuel (re-elected) | 345 | 66.4 |
| James Martin | 175 | 33.7 |
| Total formal votes | 520 | 100.0 |
| Informal votes | 0 | 0.0 |
| Turnout | 520 | 33.5 |

==== 1862 by-election ====
1861 Wellington by-election Wednesday 26 February
| Candidate | Votes | % |
|---|---|---|
| Saul Samuel (elected) | unopposed | |

Silvanus Daniel resigned.

==== 1860 ====
1860 New South Wales colonial election: Wellington Saturday 15 December
| Candidate | Votes | % |
|---|---|---|
| Silvanus Daniel (re-elected) | 174 | 76.7 |
| E B Cornish | 53 | 23.4 |
| Total formal votes | 227 | 100.0 |
| Informal votes | 0 | 0.0 |
| Turnout | 237 | 25.9 |

==== 1860 by-election ====
1860 Wellington by-election Thursday 26 July
| Candidate | Votes | % |
|---|---|---|
| Silvanus Daniel (elected) | 165 | 78.2 |
| James Garland | 46 | 21.8 |
| Total formal votes | 548 | 100.0 |
| Informal votes | 0 | 0.0 |
| Turnout | 548 | 58.0 |

Nicolas Hyeronimus died.

=== Elections in the 1850s ===
==== 1859 ====
1859 New South Wales colonial election: Wellington Wednesday 15 June
| Candidate | Votes | % |
|---|---|---|
| Nicolas Hyeronimus (elected) | 100 | 52.9 |
| Arthur Holroyd | 89 | 47.1 |
| Total formal votes | 189 | 100.0 |
| Informal votes | 0 | 0.0 |
| Turnout | 189 | 29.2 |
