= 1873 Mudgee colonial by-election =

By-election in New South Wales, Australia

A by-election was held for the New South Wales Legislative Assembly electorate of Mudgee on 8 September 1873 because Joseph Innes was appointed to the Legislative Council.

== Dates ==
Date	Event
13 August 1873	Writ of election issued by the Speaker of the Legislative Assembly and close of electoral rolls.
1 September 1873	Nominations
8 September 1873	Polling day
22 September 1873	Return of writ

== Candidates ==
- Walter Church was the former member for Goldfields West who had been defeated at the 1872 election.
- Alfred O'Connor was a gold miner who was previously a member of the Parliament of Victoria from 1861 to 1864.
- Joseph O'Connor was a printer and journalist from Sydney who had unsuccessfully stood at the December 1870 West Sydney by-election, and the 1872 Mudgee by-election.
- John Scully was a gold miner.

== Results ==
1873 Mudgee by-election Monday 8 September
Candidate	Votes	%
Joseph O'Connor (elected)	1,618	40.0
Walter Church	995	24.6
Alfred O'Connor	881	21.8
John Scully	556	13.7
Total formal votes	4,050	100.0
Informal votes	0	0.0
Turnout	4,050	45.8

== See also ==
- Electoral results for the district of Mudgee
- List of New South Wales state by-elections
