= 1891 Wellington colonial by-election =

By-election in New South Wales, Australia

A by-election was held for the New South Wales Legislative Assembly electorate of Wellington on 29 May 1891 because of the death of David Ferguson (Protectionist).

== Dates ==
Date	Event
5 May 1891	David Ferguson died.
12 May 1891	Writ of election issued by the Speaker of the Legislative Assembly.
22 May 1891	Nominations
29 May 1891	Polling day
1 June 1891	Declaration of the poll.
6 June 1891	The Legislative Assembly was dissolved, and writs were issued by the Governor to proceed with a general election.
11 June 1891	Return of writ
20 June 1891	Poll at Wellington

== Candidates ==
- Michael O'Halloran was the proprietor of the Wellington Times and Australian Industrial Liberator, founded to support the labour movement, and one of the pioneers of the Labour Electoral League, that would become the Labour Party.
- Alexander Riddel was a former minister, proprietor of the Broken Hill Times, advocate for a single tax, and another of the pioneers of the Labour Electoral League He had previously stood as a Free Trade candidate at the 1889 election for Inverell.
- Thomas Quirk was the manager of flour mills owned by the former member David Ferguson and was an alderman on the Wellington Council.
- Thomas York was a stock and station agent in Wellington and a former Mayor of Wellington.

Both O'Halloran and Riddel claimed to represent the Labour Party and engaged in a public dispute as to who had been chosen by the unions to represent the workers of Wellington. Antony Green labeled O'Halloran as a Protectionist and Riddel as a Free Trader, which reflects their positions on the fiscal issue, one of the issues which would divide the Labour Party following the 1891 election.

== Result ==
1891 Wellington by-election Friday 29 May
Party	Candidate	Votes	%	±%
Protectionist	Thomas York (elected)	292	31.0	
Protectionist	Thomas Quirk	285	30.2	
Labour	Michael O'Halloran	221	23.4	
Labour	Alexander Riddel	145	15.4	
Total formal votes		943	100.0	+3.3
Informal votes		0	0.0	−3.3
Turnout		943	58.5	+1.9
Protectionist hold				

== Aftermath ==
York did not get to take his seat as parliament was prorogued the day after the declaration of the poll, and dissolved on 6 June for a general election. York, Quirk and O'Halloran each contested the election on 20 June, with similar results, York was elected with a slightly increased margin.

== See also ==
- Electoral results for the district of Wellington
- List of New South Wales state by-elections
