= 1886 Mudgee colonial by-election =

By-election in New South Wales, Australia

A by-election was held for the New South Wales Legislative Assembly electorate of Mudgee on 29 June 1886 because of the resignation of John Robertson attributed to ill-health, financial difficulties and loss of the premiership.

== Dates ==
Date	Event
19 June 1886	Writ of election issued by the Speaker of the Legislative Assembly.
29 June 1886	Nominations
2 July 1886	Polling day
8 July 1886	Return of writ

== Results ==
1886 Mudgee by-election Tuesday 29 June
Candidate	Votes	%
William Wall (elected)	unopposed	

== See also ==
- Electoral results for the district of Mudgee
- List of New South Wales state by-elections
