= 1879 Mudgee colonial by-election =

Election result for Mudgee, New South Wales, Australia

A by-election was held for the New South Wales Legislative Assembly electorate of Mudgee on 6 January 1879 because of the resignation of Sir John Robertson who was then appointed to the Legislative Council, to facilitate the coalition of his supporters and those of Sir Henry Parkes to form an effective government.

== Dates ==
Date	Event
14 December 1878	Writ of election issued by the Speaker of the Legislative Assembly and close of electoral rolls.
30 December 1878	Nominations
6 January 1879	Polling day
21 January 1879	Return of writ

== Candidates ==
- Richard Rouse was a former member for Mudgee, winning the 1876 by-election, before being defeated by Robertson at the 1877 election.
- David Buchanan was a former member for Goldfields West, who had been defeated at the 1877 election.

== Results ==
1879 Mudgee by-election Monday 6 January
Candidate	Votes	%
Richard Rouse (elected)	895	50.03
David Buchanan	894	49.97
Total formal votes	1,789	100.0
Informal votes	0	0.0
Turnout	1,789	43.6

== Aftermath ==
In March 1879 the Committee of Elections and Qualifications overturned the election of Richard Rouse and declared that David Buchanan was elected as the member for Mudgee.

== See also ==
- Electoral results for the district of Mudgee
- List of New South Wales state by-elections
