= 1872 Mudgee colonial by-election =

By-election in New South Wales, Australia

A by-election was held for the New South Wales Legislative Assembly electorate of Mudgee on 2 January 1872 because of the resignation of Henry Stephen.

== Dates ==
Date	Event
13 December 1871	Writ of election issued by the Speaker of the Legislative Assembly and close of electoral rolls.
28 December 1871	Nominations
2 January 1872	Polling day
16 January 1872	Return of writ

== Results ==
1872 Mudgee by-election Tuesday 2 January
Candidate	Votes	%
Henry Parkes (elected)	848	64.6
Joseph O'Connor	465	35.4
Total formal votes	1,313	100.0
Informal votes	0	0.0
Turnout	1,313	48.0

== See also ==
- Electoral results for the district of Mudgee
- List of New South Wales state by-elections
