= 1887 Mudgee colonial by-election =

By-election in New South Wales, Australia

A by-election was held for the New South Wales Legislative Assembly electorate of Mudgee on 6 May 1887 because of the resignation of Adolphus Taylor (Free Trade) to become the Examiner of Patents.

== Dates ==
Date	Event
21 April 1887	Adolphus Taylor resigned.
22 April 1887	Writ of election issued by the Speaker of the Legislative Assembly and close of electoral rolls.
6 May 1887	Nominations
11 May 1887	Polling day
25 May 1887	Return of writ

== Results ==
1887 Mudgee by-election Friday 6 May
Party	Candidate	Votes	%	±%
Free Trade	John Haynes (elected)	1,025	54.5	
Protectionist	John Carden	855	45.5	
Total formal votes		1,880	100.0	
Informal votes		0	0.0	
Turnout		1,880	47.8	
Free Trade hold				

== See also ==
- Electoral results for the district of Mudgee
- List of New South Wales state by-elections
