= 1876 Mudgee colonial by-election =

By-election in New South Wales, Australia

A by-election was held for the New South Wales Legislative Assembly electorate of Mudgee on 5 October 1876 because of the death of Stephen Goold.

== Dates ==
Date	Event
26 August 1876	Stephen Goold died.
7 September 1876	Writ of election issued by the Speaker of the Legislative Assembly.
25 September 1876	Nominations
5 October 1876	Polling day
19 October 1876	Return of writ

== Results ==
1876 Mudgee by-election Thursday 5 October
Candidate	Votes	%
Richard Rouse (elected)	1,360	54.6
William Pigott	1,129	45.4
Total formal votes	2,4890	100.0
Informal votes	0	0.00
Turnout	2,489	49.0

== See also ==
- Electoral results for the district of Mudgee
- List of New South Wales state by-elections
