= 1868 Wellington colonial by-election =

By-election in New South Wales, Australia

A by-election was held for the New South Wales Legislative Assembly electorate of Wellington on 1868 because Saul Samuel had been appointed Colonial Treasurer in the second Robertson ministry. Such ministerial by-elections were usually uncontested and on this occasion the other ministers were all re-elected unopposed.

Philip Risby Holdsworth was the secretary of the protection league and opposed to the free trade treasurer. This was the first occasion on which he stood for parliament.

== Dates ==
Date	Event
27 October 1868	Saul Samuel appointed Colonial Treasurer.
27 October 1868	Writ of election issued by the Speaker of the Legislative Assembly.
9 November 1868	Nominations at Newcastle.
13 November 1868	Polling day.
8 December 1868	Return of writ

== Polling places ==
- Wellington
- Tambaoora
- Ironbarks
- Burrandong
- Molong
- Pyramul

== Result ==
1868 Wellington by-election Thursday 8 February
Candidate	Votes	%
Saul Samuel (re-elected)	173	68.9
Philip Holdsworth	78	31.1
Total formal votes	251	100.0
Informal votes	0	0.0
Turnout	251	20.5

== See also ==
- Electoral results for the district of Wellington
- List of New South Wales state by-elections
