= 1879 Mudgee colonial election re-count =

By-election in New South Wales, Australia

In March 1879 the Elections and Qualifications Committee overturned the 1879 Mudgee by-election, in which Richard Rouse had been declared elected by a margin of 1 vote over David Buchanan.

The committee declared that Richard Rouse had not been elected the member for Mudgee, however no by-election was conducted. Instead the committee declared that David Buchanan had been elected. No reasons were published however The Sydney Morning Herald stated that it appeared that the majority of Mr Rouse was created by illegal voting.

== Petition ==
Buchannan's supporters petitioned the Speaker of the Legislative Assembly against the return of Rouse, alleging that

1. The returning officer illegally voted in the election and voted for Rouse;
2. That a voter had left his vote for Rouse on the table and not placed it in the ballot box;
3. The Poll Clerk at one booth did not appear until 10:00 am despite voting commencing at 9:00 am; and
4. The electoral roll included two men under 21 years old who had voted for Rouse.

== Result ==
1879 Mudgee election re-count Thursday 20 March
Candidate	Votes	%
David Buchanan (elected)	N/A	
Richard Rouse (defeated)	N/A	

== See also ==
- Electoral results for the district of Mudgee
- List of New South Wales state by-elections
