= Edwin Richards (politician) =

Australian politician

Edwin Richards (9 March 1856 – 22 January 1927) was an Australian politician.

He was born in Mudgee to Evan Richards and Caroline Smith. He worked as a journalist, jointly running the Mudgee Independent with George Cohen until 1889. Declared bankrupt in 1890, he later became partner in a printing business. In 1898 he was elected to the New South Wales Legislative Assembly as the National Federal Party member for Mudgee. A Progressive from 1901, he retired from politics in 1907. He subsequently ran the Western Express at Rylstone until 1922. Richards died in Sydney in 1927.

New South Wales Legislative Assembly
Preceded by Robert Jones	Member for Mudgee; 1898–1907	Succeeded by Robert Jones
