= Frederick Cooke =

Australian politician

Fred Cooke

Personal details
- Born: 1 February 1897 Hill End, New South Wales
- Died: 17 July 1965 (aged 68) Springwood, New South Wales
- Party: Country Party

Frederick George Cooke (1 February 1897 – 17 July 1965) was an Australian politician. He was a member of the New South Wales Legislative Assembly for a single term from 1950 until 1953 . He was a member of the Country Party.

Cooke was born in Hill End, New South Wales. He was the son of a carrier and was educated to elementary level. After initially working as a farm hand and share farmer, Cooke became a storekeeper in Mudgee. He served in the First Australian Imperial Force and was wounded and captured in France. On repatriation he became active in Mudgee community organizations including the hospital and ambulance boards and the parents and citizens association. Cooke was a councillor on Mudgee Shire Council between 1936 and 1949 and was the mayor in 1945–6. Cooke was elected to the New South Wales Parliament as the Country Party member for Mudgee at the 1950 state election. He replaced the Labor Party's Bill Dunn who had retired. He was defeated at the 1953 state election by Labor's Leo Nott. He did not hold ministerial or party office.

New South Wales Legislative Assembly
Preceded by Bill Dunn	Member for Mudgee; 1950 – 1953	Succeeded by Leo Nott
