= Bill Dunn (Australian politician) =

Australian politician

Captain The Honourable William Dunn JP
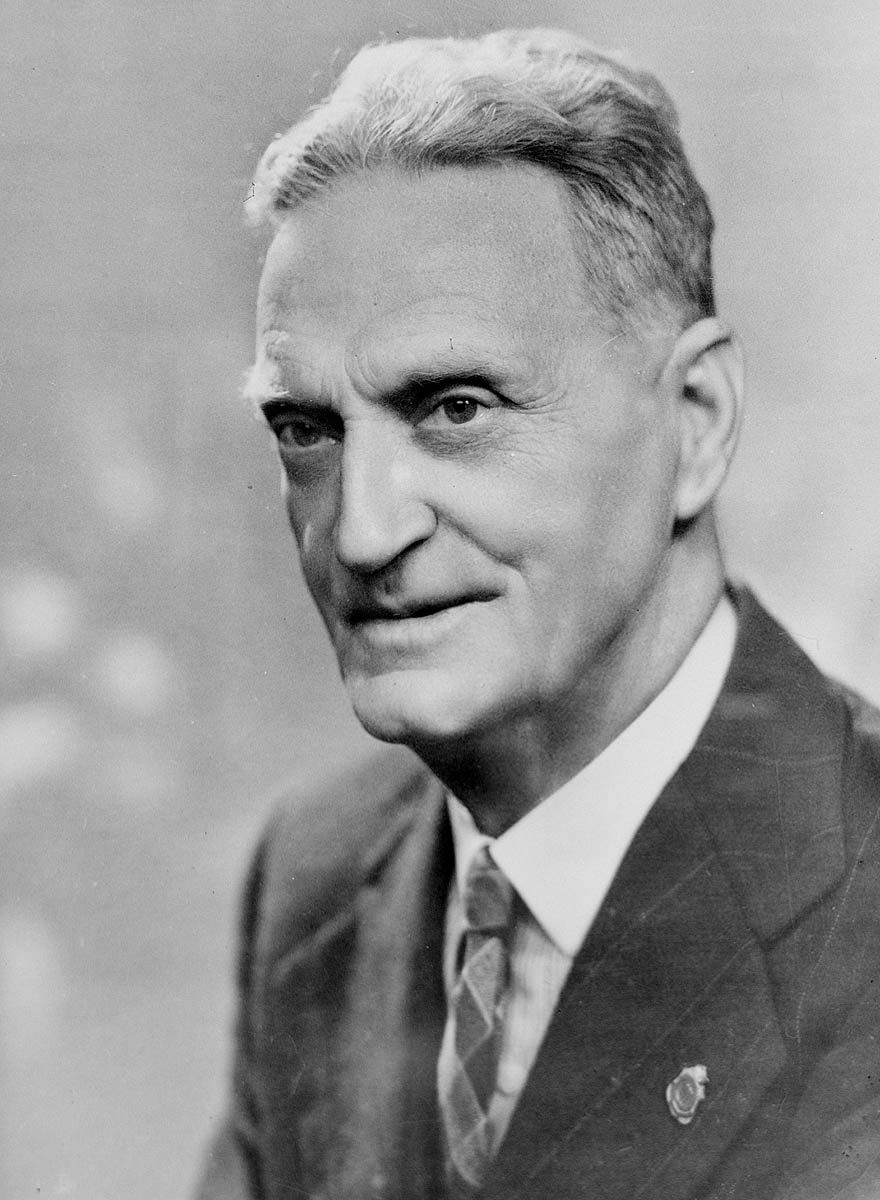
- William Fraser Dunn, NSW Minister for Agriculture

10th Leader of the Opposition of New South Wales
- In office 16 April 1923 – 31 July 1923
- Preceded by: Greg McGirr
- Succeeded by: Jack Lang

Personal details
- Born: 2 February 1877 Queanbeyan, Colony of New South Wales
- Died: 7 October 1951 (aged 74) Moore Park, New South Wales, Australia
- Party: Labor
- Spouse: Minnie Elizabeth Dunnington

Military service
- Allegiance: Australia
- Branch/service: Australian Army
- Years of service: 1915–1918
- Rank: Captain
- Unit: 35th Battalion
- Battles/wars: First World War

William Fraser Dunn JP (2 February 1877 – 7 October 1951) was a Labor Party politician and member of the New South Wales Legislative Assembly from 1910 until 1950. He served as Minister for Agriculture for eight years, as well as deputy leader and leader of the Labor Party in New South Wales.

== Early life ==
Dunn was born in Queanbeyan where his father was a small farm holder. He was educated at the local public school which he left at the age of 15 to assist on his father's farm. Following an injury he joined the New South Wales Department of Education and taught at various schools in NSW regional areas.

== Political career ==
He joined the ALP in 1895 and was the party's successful candidate for the seat of Mudgee in the 1910 election. He resigned from the Labor Party and parliament in protest at the party's land policy in 1911. This left the party without a majority in the parliament and the policy was rapidly changed, allowing Dunn to win the resulting by-election as the endorsed ALP candidate. He continued as the member for Mudgee until the seat was replaced by the multi-member seat of Wammerawa in 1920. He represented this electorate until the single member seat of Mudgee was recreated in 1927 and, with the exception of the period 1932–1935, he remained the member for Mudgee until his retirement in 1950. In 1915-1918 he was granted leave from parliament to serve as a captain in the First Australian Imperial Force.

== Ministerial career ==
Dunn was the Minister for Agriculture in the governments of John Storey, James Dooley, Jack Lang, William McKell and the first ministry of James McGirr. Under his leadership the ministry expanded its activities in organised marketing and co-operative development.

== Party Leader ==
Although Dunn had no factional power base in the Labor Party, his geniality resulted in his advancement within the parliamentary caucus. He was the deputy leader of the party in 1922–1923 and was selected by the federal executive of the ALP as a stopgap parliamentary leader during a factional party schism related to the expulsion of James Dooley from the party. Jack Lang claimed that Dunn spent much of his time as party leader wandering around parliament house, trying to get Labor party members to attend a caucus meeting.

New South Wales Legislative Assembly
Preceded by Robert Jones	Member for Mudgee; 1910–1920	District abolished
New district	Member for Wammerawa; 1920–1927; Served alongside: Clark/Thorby/Ashford	District abolished
New district	Member for Mudgee; 1927–1932	Succeeded by David Spring
Preceded by David Spring	Member for Mudgee; 1935–1950	Succeeded by Frederick Cooke
Political offices
Preceded by William Ashford	Minister for Agriculture; 1920–1921	Succeeded by Frank Chaffey
Preceded by Frank Chaffey	Minister for Agriculture; 1921–1922	Succeeded by Richard Ball
Preceded by Frank Chaffey	Minister for Agriculture; 1925–1927	Succeeded by Paddy Stokes
Preceded by Harold Thorby	Minister for Agriculture; 1930–1932	Succeeded by Hugh Main
Preceded by Reginald Weaver	Minister for Forests; 1930–1932	Succeeded by Hugh Main
Preceded by Albert Reid as Minister for Agriculture	Minister for Agriculture and Forests; 1941–1944	Succeeded by Eddie Graham as Minister for Agriculture
Preceded by Roy Vincent as Minister for Forests	Minister for Agriculture and Forests; 1941–1944	Vacant Title next held by Milton Morris as Minister for Forests
New title	Minister for Conservation; 1944–1946	Succeeded by George Weir
Preceded by Jack Tully	Secretary for Lands; 1946–1947	Succeeded by Bill Sheahan
Party political offices
Preceded by ????	Deputy Leader of the Australian Labor Party (NSW Branch); 1922–1923	Succeeded by Jack Baddeley
Preceded by Greg McGirr	Leader of the Australian Labor Party (NSW Branch); 1923	Succeeded by Jack Lang
