= Alfred Arthur O'Connor =

Australian politician

Alfred Arthur O'Connor was a wild-card Irish miner who attended the Melbourne Land Convention 1857 and was elected onto the Ballarat Mining Board 1858; he followed the big gold rush to Chiltern in 1859 and was a successful deep wet lead miner. He stood as a candidate for the Ovens election in 1859 and lost. Returned to Ballarat and was elected into parliament for Grenville during 1861.

O'Connor moved to Sydney in 1872 and was an unsuccessful candidate at the 1873 Mudgee by-election for the New South Wales Legislative Assembly.

His activities on the Ovens covered in detail in Shenanigans on the Ovens Goldfields: the 1859 election.
