= Reginald Black =

Australian politician

Reginald James Black (19 March 1845 – 30 June 1928) was an Australian politician.

He was born in Sydney to cashier John Henry Black, later general manager of the Bank of New South Wales, and Louisa Skinner. He attended Sydney Grammar School, and worked for the Bank of New South Wales from 1863. After working at Penrith, Bathurst, Goulburn and Glen Innes, he was assistant inspector and then manager of the Bathurst branch from 1875 to 1880. From 1882 he was a stockbroker. On 26 February 1883 he married Eleanor Rouse, with whom he had six children. In 1887 Black was elected to the New South Wales Legislative Assembly as a Free Trade member for Mudgee. Re-elected in 1889, he was defeated in 1891. In 1898 he became director of the Bank of New South Wales and also of the Australian Mutual Providence Society. He was appointed to the New South Wales Legislative Council in 1900, serving until his death at Wollstonecraft in 1928.

New South Wales Legislative Assembly
Preceded by Thomas Browne; Adolphus Taylor	Member for Mudgee; 1887–1891; Served alongside: John Haynes, William Wall	Succeeded by Robert Jones
