= Robert Jones (Australian politician) =

Australian politician

Robert Jones (1845 – 7 January 1927) was an Irish-born Australian politician.

He was born in Longford to farmer William Jones and Anne Percival. He arrived in Sydney in the early 1860s and worked as a shearer, drover and stationhand at Coonabarabran from 1862 to 1866. From 1872 to 1887 he was the butcher and hotelier at the goldmining town of Hargraves, moving to Mudgee in 1888. In 1891 he was elected to the New South Wales Legislative Assembly as the Free Trade member for Mudgee. He was defeated in 1898, but returned in 1907 to serve a single term as a Liberal before being defeated again in 1910. Jones died in Mudgee in 1927.

New South Wales Legislative Assembly
Preceded by Reginald Black	Member for Mudgee; 1891–1898; Served alongside: Haynes/none; Wall/none	Succeeded by Edwin Richards
Preceded by Edwin Richards	Member for Mudgee; 1907–1910	Succeeded by Bill Dunn
