= David Spring =

Australian politician

David Hugh Spring (1 March 1872 – 7 June 1947) was an Australian politician, member of the New South Wales Legislative Assembly.

== Early life ==
Spring was born at Pine Ridge near Gulgong to land and commercial agent Gerald Spring (also a member of the New South Wales Legislative Assembly, 1869–72, 1882–87) and Jane née Watt. He attended Young Public School and Newington College.

== Career ==
He became a clerk with the Australian Joint Stock Bank and then mining at Captains Flat. Spring served in the Boer War as a second lieutenant, and also in World War I as a private. He and his wife Maisie had five children. He worked as an auctioneer at Gulgong until 1925 and was active in the local community, serving as a local alderman in 1910. In 1932 he was elected to the New South Wales Legislative Assembly as the member for Mudgee, having had joint endorsement from the United Australia Party and the Country Party; he sat with the latter in parliament. He was defeated in 1935.

== Death ==
Spring died at Mudgee in 1947.

New South Wales Legislative Assembly
Preceded by Bill Dunn	Member for Mudgee; 1932–1935	Succeeded by Bill Dunn
