= Leo Nott =

Australian politician

Shire President of Gulgong
- In office 17 December 1951 – 26 August 1953
- Deputy: B. B. Loneragan
- Preceded by: Norman Horne
- Succeeded by: B. B. Loneragan

Member of the New South Wales Parliament for Mudgee
- In office 14 February 1953 – 23 January 1968
- Preceded by: Frederick Cooke
- Succeeded by: Seat Abolished

Member of the New South Wales Parliament for Burrendong
- In office 13 February 1971 – 19 October 1973
- Preceded by: Roger Wotton
- Succeeded by: Roger Wotton

Councillor of the Gulgong Shire Council
- In office 2 December 1950 – 5 December 1953
- Constituency: D Riding

Personal details
- Born: 27 October 1915 Dunedoo, New South Wales, Australia
- Died: 19 September 1992 (aged 76) Rockdale, New South Wales, Australia
- Party: Labor
- Occupation: shearer, farmer

Leo Mervyn Nott (27 October 1915 – 19 September 1992) was an Australian politician and a member of the New South Wales Legislative Assembly between 1953 and 1968 and again between 1971 and 1973. He was a member of the NSW Branch of the Labor Party.

== Early life ==
Nott was born at Dunedoo, New South Wales and was the son of a farmer. His brother, [Hon Roger Nott, CBE], was a member of the Legislative Assembly between 1941 and 1961 and a minister between 1954 and 1961. He was educated to elementary level at Dunedoo Catholic School and initially worked as a shearer and farm hand before becoming a sheep and wheat farmer. He was active in community organizations in the Dunedoo area including the Land Board, Hospital Board and Wheatgrowers' Union.

Nott was elected to Gulgong Shire Council between 1950 and 1953 and was the Shire President in 1951–53.

== Political career ==
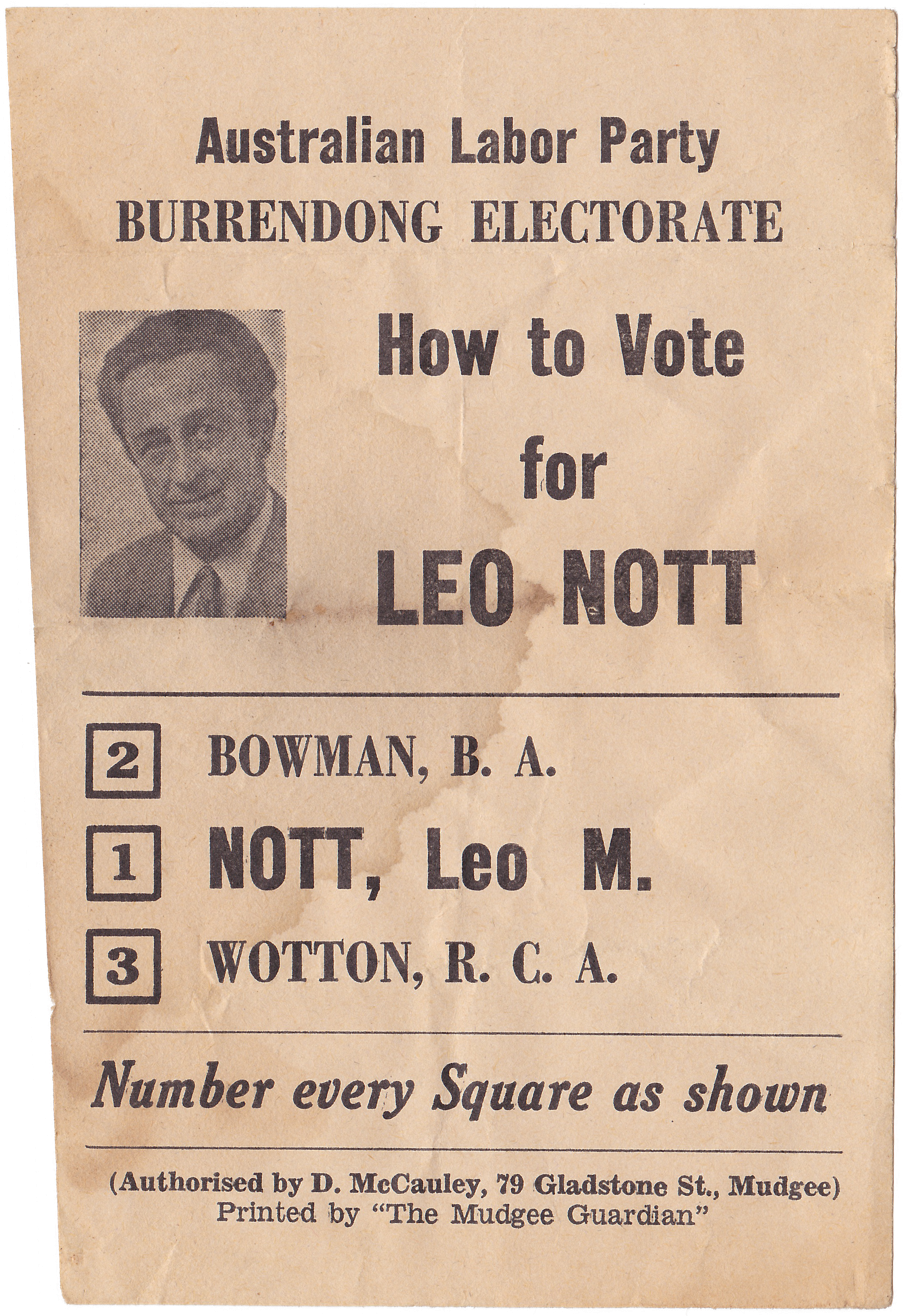
Leo Nott, ALP. 1973 how to vote slip. Burrendong Electorate.

Nott was elected to the parliament as the Labor member for Mudgee at the 1953 state election in an election marked by a resurgence in Labor support in rural NSW. He was the chairman of Labor's Country Conference between 1949 and 1952 but did not hold any other party, parliamentary or ministerial office. Nott retained the seat for Labor at the next four elections until it was abolished in 1968.

Nott then retired from public life and worked at the Daily Telegraph. He was persuaded to stand again, as the Labor candidate for the seat of Burrendong, which had replaced Mudgee, at the 1971 state election, defeating the sitting Country Party member, Roger Wotton. However, the result was reversed at the next election in 1973 and Nott did not contest any further elections. After leaving parliament he retired.

New South Wales Legislative Assembly
Preceded by Frederick Cooke	Member for Mudgee; 1953 – 1968	Succeeded by seat abolished
Preceded by Roger Wotton	Member for Burrendong; 1971 – 1973	Succeeded by Roger Wotton
