= Wellington Times =

Newspaper published in Wellington, NSW, Australia

- Type: Weekly newspaper
- Owner: Australian Community Media
- Founder: Michael Conlan O'Halloran
- Founded: 1889
- Language: English
- City: Wellington, New South Wales
- Website: wellingtontimes.com.au

The Wellington Times is a newspaper published in Wellington, New South Wales, Australia since 1889. The Wellington Times has also been published as The Wellington Times and Australian Industrial Liberator.

== History ==
The Wellington Times and Australian Industrial Liberator was first published on 23 May 1889 by Michael Conlan O'Halloran to support the labour movement. In 1899 the name was shortened to the Wellington Times. In 1927 the Wellington Times absorbed The Wellington Gazette.

In 1972 the Wellington Star was established as a competitor to the Times by Colin Lord. However the Star was incorporated into the Times in 1973 when the latter was purchased by Lord. The Times was purchased by Macquarie Publications in 1984 from Lord and is today published by Fairfax Regional Media.

== Digitisation ==
The paper has been digitised as part of the Australian Newspapers Digitisation Program project of the National Library of Australia.

== See also ==
- List of newspapers in Australia
- List of newspapers in New South Wales
