= Hugo Louis Beyers =

Australian politician

- Born: Ludwig Hugo Beyers; 1 January 1845; Posen, Westpreussen, Prussia
- Died: 28 May 1910 (aged 65); Mount Morgans, Western Australia, Australia
- Occupation(s): gold miner and politician
- Spouse: Mary Emmett (1850–1883)
- Children: Sylvia Helena Beatrice Beyers (1868–1919); Gertrude Harriet Adeline Beyers (1870–1966); Oswald Arthur Bernard Beyers (1873–1943); Letita Mary Aurora Beyers (1874–1883); Clara Victoria Matilda Beyers (1877–1949); Theodore Greville Mcculloch Beyers (1878–1940); Bellvinah Clorinda Lou Beyers (1881–1914)
- Relatives: Bernhardt Holtermann (husband of sister-in-law) and business partner

Ludwig Hugo (Louis) Beyers was a German-Australian gold miner and politician.

== Biography ==
After his parents died in West Prussia from plague, he immigrated at age 13 to America, arriving in New York City. Not permitted to proceed to the California goldfields because of his youth, he then journeyed to Australia, arriving in 1856.

He married Mary Emmett (daughter of Edward Emmett) on 22 February 1868 at White Rock, near Bathurst, New South Wales, Australia in a double wedding. Mary's sister Harriet married his friend and mining partner Bernhardt Holtermann.

== Career ==
On arrival in Sydney, he worked as a draper's assistant, and in 1856 moved to Hill End to mine gold. He also prospected at Rockhampton, the Snowy River, Lucknow and in New Zealand. He set up a partnership with Bernard Holtermann at Hill End and in 1870 – 1871, they struck a rich vein of gold and in 1872, they floated the Star of Hope Gold Mining Company which found the largest specimen of reef gold (Holtermann's nugget).

He was an alderman at Hill End from 1875, and its mayor from 1876 until 1877 and again from 1885. He was elected to the New South Wales Legislative Assembly on 12 November 1877, retiring on 23 November 1882. He was the member for Goldfields from 12 November 1877 to 9 November 1880 and Mudgee from 1 December 1880 to 23 November 1882. He was a patron of the local hospital at Hill End and a member of many friendly societies.

A friend, to whom he had entrusted the management of his estate, enriched himself and left Beyers bankrupted in 1894. He moved to Mount Higgins, Western Australia, where he successfully resumed mining.

New South Wales Legislative Assembly
Preceded by David Buchanan	Member for Goldfields West; 1877–1880	District abolished
New district	Member for Mudgee; 1880–1882; With: Buchanan, Terry/Robertson	Succeeded by Adolphus Taylor
