= John Samuel Smith =

Australian politician

John Samuel Smith (1841 – 6 July 1882) was an Australian politician.

He was the son of solicitor John Smith and was a wealthy squatter at South Creek. He married actress Kate Corcoran. He owned racehorses, including Speculation which won the Sydney Cup in 1874 and in partnership with William Long, the unbeaten Grand Flaneur.

In 1872, he was elected to the New South Wales Legislative Assembly for Wellington, serving until 1877 when he unsuccessfully contested Nepean.

Smith died in London in 1882 aged 41.

New South Wales Legislative Assembly
Preceded by Gerald Spring	Member for Wellington; 1872–1877	Succeeded by John Shepherd
