= William Wall (Australian politician) =

Australian politician (1845–1926)

William Chandos Wall
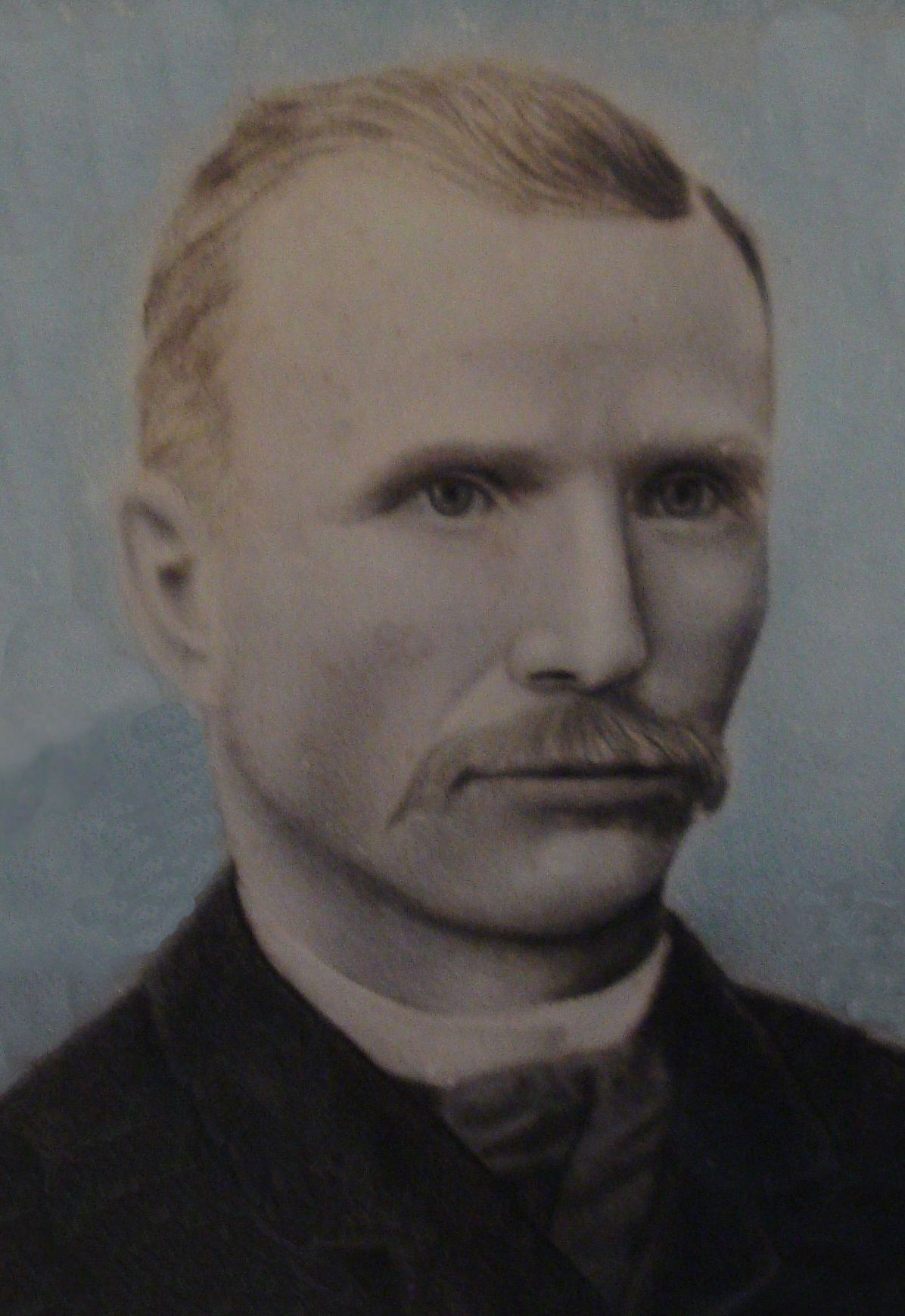

Member of the New South Wales Legislative Assembly for Mudgee
- In office 29 June 1886 – 25 June 1894
- Preceded by: Sir John Robertson KCMG
- Succeeded by: Robert Jones

Member for Rylstone
- In office 29 June 1886 – 25 June 1894
- Succeeded by: John Fitzpatrick

Personal details
- Born: 27 November 1845 Sydney
- Died: 1 July 1926 (aged 80) Granville NSW
- Party: Protectionist
- Spouse: Mary (née) Hunt
- Occupation: Mining Agent
- Profession: Miner

William Chandos Wall (27 November 1845 – 1 July 1926) was an Australian politician. He was also a prospector, geologist, minerals surveyor, commission / mining agent, inventor and a quarry and mine operator before and after entering politics. In June 1886 he was elected to the New South Wales Legislative Assembly to succeed the former NSW premier Sir John Robertson KCMG as one of the members for Mudgee. In 1894 Wall transferred to Rylstone and in July 1895 he lost the Rylstone seat.

== Parliamentary career ==
William Chandos Wall was a 'liberal' Protectionist member in the NSW Parliaments from the 12th to the 16th inclusive (under the Jennings, Parkes, Dibbs and Reid Governments). After representing Mudgee in four Parliaments, he served only one term for Rylstone, and was defeated by the Free-Trade candidate, John Charles Lucas Fitzpatrick, in the elections for the 17th parliament in 1895. The first result for the 1895 election in Rylstone, held on 24 July, was disputed. A by-election was then held on 14 October 1895 and although Fitzpatrick was again returned, it appeared that Wall was correct in his assertion that the original count was irregular. (The Elections and Qualifications Committee in its re-count of the July election, excluded 256 of the 1028 votes cast). Although voting was not compulsory and the electorate was relatively small, the 1895 by-election in Rylstone was hotly contested. 1028 votes (54.6% of eligible voters) were counted in the July election and 1309 (69.55% of eligible voters) in the by-election held on Monday 14 October 1895. In this context, the 1895 Rylstone election was seen as a public scandal and was subject to an investigation and Report to the NSW Parliament.

Wall stood in the 1898 NSW State Election for the seat of Botany, but polled only 2.3% of the vote. He was a supporter for Federation which in the 1898 NSW Referendum had failed to reach the 80,000 'yes' votes necessary to proceed. A second NSW Referendum in 1899 polled 107,420 to 82,741 and the enabling legislation was passed by the UK Parliament in July 1900. Wall also stood in the 1902 by-election for the seat of Inverell as an Independent Federalist obtaining 26.5% of the vote, but finished third behind the Labor Party candidate, George Alfred Jones, who won 37.7%. In 1903, he stood as a Protectionist candidate for the national Parliament in the (Federal) seat of Robertson. He was defeated by Henry Willis (Free-Trade). The Protectionist Party was in decline at this time and would merge with the Anti-Socialist Party in May 1909. Again in 1907 Wall stood as an independent for the NSW State seat of Mudgee, but polled only 3.7% of the votes cast. It seems that after the 1907 defeat, he gave up his attempts to re-enter parliament.

The (pro-Protectionist) Bulletin Weekly of 12 October 1916 said:

"Though unheard of in politics these days W. C. Wall once loomed large on the New South Wales horizon. It used to be said that he had only to send his old boots up to Rylstone to secure his return on polling day." This claim (it actually was about sending his old boots up to Wollar) was ascribed to Wall as part of what appeared to be a ‘dirty tricks’ campaign around the 1895 election. It offended the Wollar voters and he lost a substantial number of their 90 votes. This led to his 1895 defeat. Similarly in the 1907 NSW Election, this story was again used against him. He denied it and challenged the proponents to prove it. No proof was ever offered.

== Mining activity ==
William Chandos took out 2 mining leases in July 1884 (the year of his marriage and the year that first train arrived in Mudgee on 10 September 1884) in Gulgong and several more there in 1886 and 1887. This was a pattern of mining activity in which he was active most of his life. He appears to have been a knowledgeable geologist and over his long career prospected for or mined: antimony (at Moolarben – 20 Km NE of Crossroads, Mudgee), gold, iron at Cooyal and Tallawang, tin and tungsten (Ardlethan and Yalgogrin, NSW), coal and kerosene shale (Megalong Valley), limestone, dolomite and gypsum (at Wall's Mt. Knowles quarries).

He moved on to the Blue Mountains, NSW around late 1887, where he spent some time surveying the geology in and about the Megalong Valley. Wall's Pass from the adjacent Cedar Valley up the eastern escarpment to the Narrow Neck Plateau is named after him. As a result of his survey work, in October 1888 he took out Mining Permits in the Megalong Valley, NSW around Narrow Neck and Ruined Castle. In March 1890 he was part of a syndicate with his brothers, Ignatius and Damian, and some parliamentary colleagues to establish the Megalong Coal and Shale Mining Company Limited to acquire the mining rights, from Messrs. W. C. Wall MP, I. Wall, D. R. Wall, Thomas Hassall, William Dowel, and J. M. Moxon, and to mine for coal and shale. This period was at the start of the 1890s depression and company was "extinct' a year later.

At the time of his mother's death, in 1891, he was living in Wentworth Falls, NSW. In the same year he appears to have had some financial benefit from his enterprises and moved his family to live in Sydney. Between 1892 and 1895 (the year he was defeated in the Rylstone Election) he took out further mining leases at Hargraves (with George Ensor), at Windeyer (with Robert Victor Leffley) and alone at Peak Hill (130 Km west of Mudgee). In 1903 he took over the gold mine of Garner and party at Windeyer. In 1907 W.C. Wall and Patrick Pilley held Mining Lease No. 1 at Hargraves, NSW. 1908 saw him negotiating with Messrs G and C Hoskins, proprietors of the Eskbank Iron Works, about the sale of his discoveries of iron ore at Cooyal, Lowes Park and Tallawang. In 1909 he went so far as to set up an "open draught furnace" and produced some iron which he exhibited at the Mudgee Show. Wall was an activist for sound forestry management and was well known for his knowledge of geology and as a champion for mining and miners when he served in parliament. Gold production peaked in Australia in 1903 at around 130 tons (about 30% of total world production), so, Wall's activity coincided with the period of greatest Australian interest in gold mining.

After his parliamentary service, his Megalong Valley enterprise and his discharge from bankruptcy on 19 Nov 1901, Wall's activity switched back to the Mudgee area. Between August 1907 and May 1908, he took up further mining leases in Windeyer and Hargraves. The complex geology of the district held/holds many opportunities and gold mining the deeper reefs using modern techniques is still being carried out (Aug. 2008) in all the Mudgee areas where Wall once held mining leases.

In 1906, he attempted to set up a kerosene shale mining operation in the Barigan Valley (at Peters Creek, west of Barigan Road) – between Wollar & Botobolar, but this project seems to have been later abandoned. (However in 1924 and again in the 1940s, shale was being carted from the Barigan deposits to the rail head at Lue – 25 km south east of Mudgee – on the second occasion, when additional oil was needed during the Second World War.)

By 1911, Wall was operating gypsum (Calcium sulphate), dolomite (Calcium-Magnesium carbonate) and limestone (Calcium carbonate) quarries on Dolomite Road at Mount Knowles near Mudgee (possibly with his brothers Ignatius and Damian) and ran a private tramway to move the quarried stone to connect with the main railway from Mudgee to the Blue Mountains at Wall's Siding, Mount Knowles. Others were also quarrying in that area. "Messrs. G. & C. Hoskins being supplied by Messrs. Curlewis, also of Wall's Siding, the dolomite in this instance being calcined in a cupola furnace before railing to Lithgow". Wall's limestone and gypsum was also shipped to Sydney.

In May 1911 he held Lease PL No. 232 adjoining the Traelman Gold mining Company at Ivy Paddock near Mudgee and was also investigating the setting-up of a 'hill-side' furnace on the Dunedoo rail line, near Mudgee. In October 1912, a William Wall is listed as holding a 4 acre mining lease at Yambulla (south of Cooma, NSW).

In 1913, he was operating his business from offices adjacent to the London Hotel in Ardlethan, NSW. These rented offices were burnt down along with a few shops and the Bank of NSW on Christmas morning 1914 It must have been a significant set back at 69 to have lost all his professional equipment in this fire. He seems to have been well regarded there and played a significant role the mining affairs of the town. In 1915 he was operating mining leases around Ardlethan and Narian. The 1917 Sands Country Alphabetical Directory lists W. C. Wall as a Mining Agent at Ardlethan, NSW (80 km east of Griffith). Two years later in 1919 Wall was at North Yalgogrin, NSW (35 Km west of West Wyalong where gold was first discovered in 1893 on Robert Payne's selection 2 Km east of the township) mining gold and processing his ore at the Yalgogrin stamper battery. He was then 74.

In the letter from Yalgogrin to his daughter Ethel (June 1919), he describes the severe drought at that time and states his intention to come down to Sydney via Mudgee as soon as he can process his ore at the Yalgogrin stamper battery.

In 1921, at 76, he was back in Mudgee mining and was well known for his expertise.

He spent the last few years of his life in Sydney.

== Biography ==
William Chandos Wall was the son of William Charles & Mary (née Maher) Wall. William Charles and Mary were Bounty immigrants from Tipperary, Ireland, who came to Sydney, Australia on the Forth in 1841. William 'Chandos' Wall was baptised: William Michael, on 7 Dec 1845 in St Mary's Cathedral, Sydney. The origin of the name ‘Chandos’ by/or for William Michael is not known. He was officially known as William Chandos and by his Parliamentary nickname, 'Billy'. He died on 1 July 1926, at Granville, NSW.

His lifelong interest in mining was probably initiated with his family's move from Sydney to the Meroo, NSW goldfield when he was 3 years old (his father ran a ‘goldfield's pub’ there, – "The Golden Inn"). His father subsequently established his capital from his mining activity on the goldfields around Mudgee and at Kaludabah (between Mudgee and Gulgong – where his brother, Damian Redman Wall, was born). With this stake his father established the "Travellers Rest" hotel at Stony Creek just north of Mudgee. Wall and his brothers grew up surrounded by prospecting "lore".

Wall was an autodidact. When he was 12, the Mechanics Institute Library was located in a property at 3 Short Street Mudgee belonging to his uncle, Thomas Spicer. It contained 200 volumes. It is likely that this library provided the beginning for his extensive knowledge of minerals, geology and mining practice. As noted above, he was interested in forestry and his Hansard speeches show his interests ranged widely.

William Chandos Wall – (Commission Agent, and in his later years – Mining Agent) of Stoney (sic.) Creek, Mudgee, NSW, married Mary Hunt (dressmaker) in Mudgee on 31 Dec 1884. Mary was a strong resourceful woman and was raised on cattle stations on the anabranch of the Macintyre River – near the present NSW and Queensland border – and south of there, on the Liverpool Plains. This country was first settled in the 1840s to 1860s. She was descended from Irish convict pioneers from the Hunter Valley and Bathurst. William Chandos and Mary née Hunt had 7 children. All were professionals; the sons including a doctor and a lawyer and the daughters worked in health services and office management. Two sons served in World War I and two in World War II.

In his early days in Parliament, Wall stayed at hotels while in Sydney for the Parliamentary sessions. For example, in 1888 he was staying at the Picton Arms Hotel, in Campbell Street Sydney not too far from Redfern where the Mudgee train terminated at that time.'. (The Central Railway Station terminus was opened in 1906). In 1891, Wall's family moved from Mudgee to Sydney. In 1892, at the time of the birth of their son, Hugh Alton Chandos, his wife, Mary née Hunt was living in Glebe, NSW. The family then moved to Newtown and then to Stanmore NSW. At the time of her death, Mary née Hunt was living in what became the family home for the next 40 years in Randwick.

As well as helping on the Wall family farms around Stoney Creek, Wall acted as a Commission Agent for selectors in the district. This led him to become involved in the Land Law Reform Movement and he attended the Land Law Reform Conference in Sydney in October 1882 in which he played a significant role along with other prominent members in the movement like Edward O'Sullivan, and John Gale. After his election to the NSW Parliament he also worked to 'pave the way' for a Mining on Private Property Bill for NSW, as existed in Victoria.

Wall was put into bankruptcy in September 1897 by the Australian Joint Stock Bank, which called up Wall's guarantee for his brother, Ignatius', debt. Wall's son, Leo, held that it was related to the bank crash earlier that decade (1893/94). "The depth of the recession in the early to mid-1890s in Australia is a reflection of the negative real economic growth between 1890 and 1895 of (minus) -6.3% ." Leo was correct and although the Australian Joint Stock Bank was eventually wound up by its fixed deposit holders and creditors only at a meeting in London on 22 March 1910, it had been in a continuing scheme of arrangement since 1893, when it took the action which sent Wall bankrupt. Twelve banks operating in Australia were 'restructured' in 1893 as a result of the banking crisis in that year.

He was also an inventor, and his interests ranged over many issues during his life. Some of his 'Letters to Editor' appear in the Sydney Morning Herald from the 1880s through to the early 1900s.

After a long (colourfull?) career working in outback NSW and as he aged, his health suffered and he became estranged from his wife and immediate family. He died destitute on 1 July 1926 (aged 80) in the Rookwood State Hospital and Asylum for Men. His extended family saw him as the most significant and eminent of his Wall generation. He is buried in the Rookwood Cemetery.

== Notes and references ==
New South Wales Legislative Assembly
Preceded by John Robertson	Member for Mudgee; 1886–1894; With: Browne/Black/Jones; Taylor/Haynes	Succeeded by Robert Jones
New district	Member for Rylstone; 1894–1895	Succeeded by John Fitzpatrick
