= David Ferguson (Australian politician) =

By-election in New South Wales, Australia

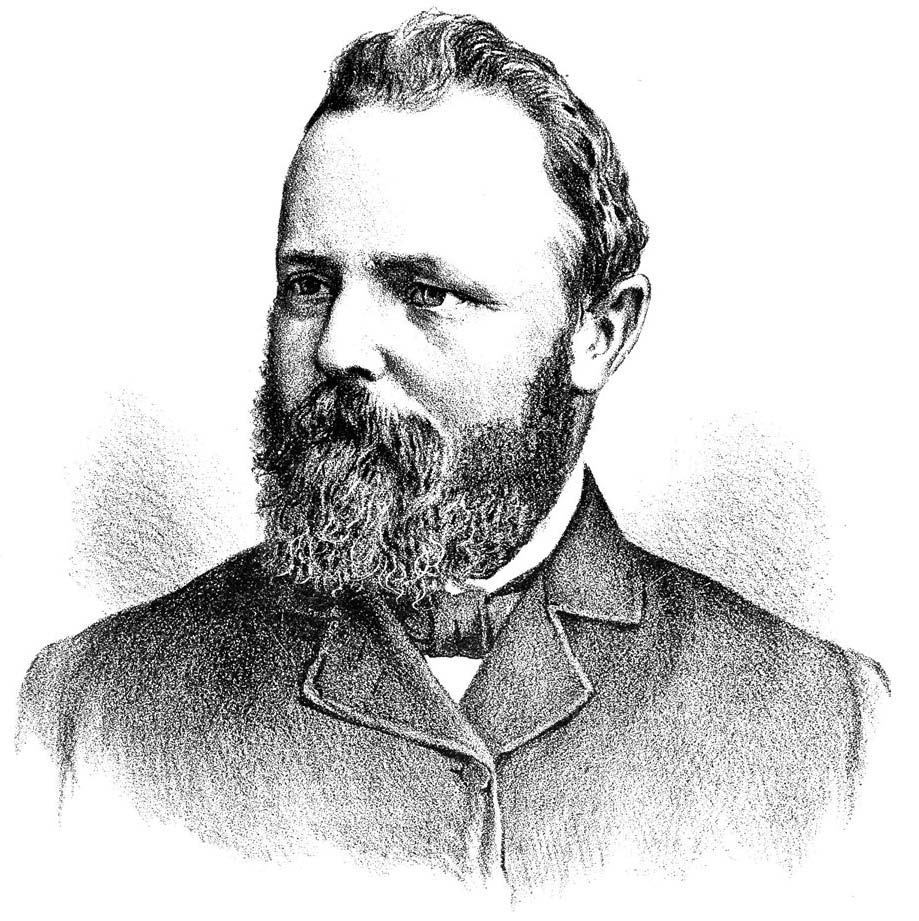

David Alexander Ferguson (16 October 1844 – 5 May 1891) was an Australian politician.

He was born at Naria near Wellington to innkeeper Alexander Ferguson and Elizabeth Inglis. He was educated at Bathurst and Redfern, and became a pastoralist, first managing his father's properties and then inheriting them in 1869. On 8 June 1868 he married Elizabeth Phillips, with whom he had nine children; a second marriage, on 12 March 1890 to Jane Horn, produced no children. Ferguson was a Wellington alderman from 1879, and served as mayor in 1881.

In 1882 he was elected to the New South Wales Legislative Assembly as the member for Wellington. A Protectionist, he served until his death in 1891.

New South Wales Legislative Assembly
Preceded by Edmund Barton	Member for Wellington; 1882–1891	Succeeded by Thomas York
