= Stephen Goold =

English-born Australian politician

Stephen Styles Goold (1817 – 28 August 1876) was an English-born Australian politician.

He was born in Wiltshire, the son of Moses Goold, an English Jew. He migrated to Sydney in 1841 and worked as a painter and glazier. On 7 March 1843 he married Margery Balfour, with whom he had four children. By the 1860s he owned several houses at Waterloo, and he joined the Protestant Political Association, becoming its paid itinerant organiser in 1869. In 1870 he was elected to Sydney City Council, serving until 1876 and as Mayor in 1874. In 1874 he was elected to the New South Wales Legislative Assembly for Mudgee, but he died in Sydney in 1876.

New South Wales Legislative Assembly
Preceded by Joseph O'Connor	Member for Mudgee; 1874–1876	Succeeded by Richard Rouse
Civic offices
Preceded by James Merriman	Mayor of Sydney; 1874	Succeeded by Benjamin Palmer
