= Adolphus Taylor =

Australian politician (1857–1900)

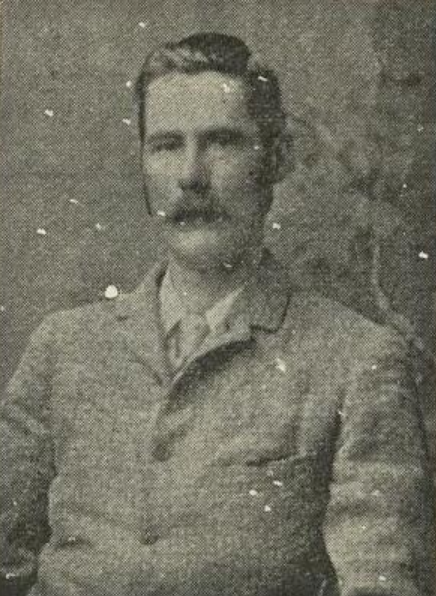
Adolphus Taylor

Adolphus George Taylor (14 June 1857 – 18 January 1900) was an Australian journalist and populist politician, active in New South Wales the 1880s and 1890s.

== Early life ==
Reputed the illegitimate son of a gentleman father, Taylor was born in Mudgee, New South Wales and was educated at the local Church of England School and became a teacher in Mudgee by 1875. He joined the New South Wales Permanent Artillery as a private, but was court-martialled for "insubordination" in 1878. He then joined or returned to the Mudgee Independent as a journalist.

== Political career ==
Taylor - "a lanky youth, dressed in a torn coat that hang from his ears" - won a surprise victory in the seat Mudgee in 1882, pushing the longtime popular hero, Sir John Robertson, into second place. He became an expert in parliamentary procedure and constitutional law, and established that George Reid's appointment as a Minister for Public Instruction in 1883 was unconstitutional, forcing Reid to stand for a by-election, which he lost. His emotional and often drunken harangues of the House led to frequent expulsions and as a result of being suspended twice in a row for a week by the Speaker, Edmund Barton, he successfully sued Barton for £1,000. In 1886, he travelled to London to fight Barton's appeal to the Privy Council, having raised his fare by lecturing on "The Iron Hand in Politics" and selling his stamp collection. He took "his wife, his mother, a cockatoo, a parrot and a magpie" to England and won his own case, although he then refused to accept the damages on the basis that they would come out of the taxpayers pockets rather than Barton's.

In April 1887, Taylor resigned from Parliament so that he could be appointed examiner of patents. He was re-elected to parliament as the member for West Sydney in 1890 but did not stand for the 1891 election, following widespread criticism of his delayed report of the rape of his 12-year-old maid servant by clerical imposter, James Joseph Crouch. He ran unsuccessfully for Sydney-King in 1894.

== Later life ==
Taylor became the first editor of the Truth in 1890 and 1891, and he returned to edit it in 1894. In 1892 he edited a the Spectator short-lived rural paper.

Alcoholic and probably neurosyphilitic, in 1898, aged 45, Taylor was admitted to the Hospital for the Insane in the Sydney suburb of Callan Park, where he died, survived by his wife, Rosetta Nicholls, who he had married in 1885. He was buried at Rookwood Anglican Cemetery on 20 January 1900.

W.B. Melville recorded of Taylor, "He could discern the weaknesses of his contemporaries, he could not cure his own".

== Notes ==
=== Sources ===
- Pearl, Cyril (1958). Wild Men of Sydney. London: W.H. Allen. ISBN 0-207-13539-8.

New South Wales Legislative Assembly
Preceded by Louis Beyers	Member for Mudgee; 1882–1887; With: David Buchanan / Thomas Browne; John Robertson / William Wall	Succeeded by Reginald Black; John Haynes; William Wall
Preceded by Alfred Lamb	Member for West Sydney; 1890–1891; With: Francis Abigail; Daniel O'Connor; Thomas Playfair	Succeeded by George Black; Thomas Davis; Jack FitzGerald; Andrew Kelly
