= Joseph Innes =

Australian politician

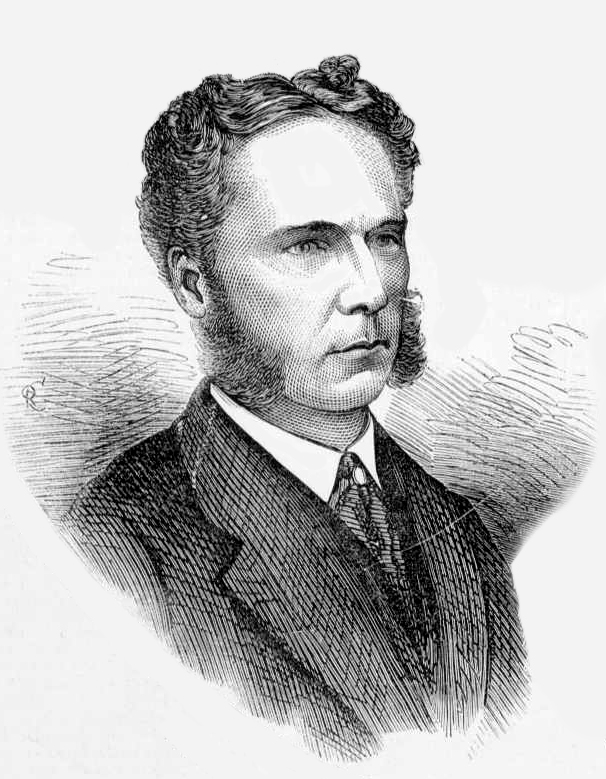
Joseph Innes, 1874 engraving

Sir Joseph George Long Innes (16 October 1834 – 28 October 1896), often referred to as Sir J. George Long Innes, was a judge and politician in colonial Australia, and Attorney General of New South Wales from 1873 to 1875.

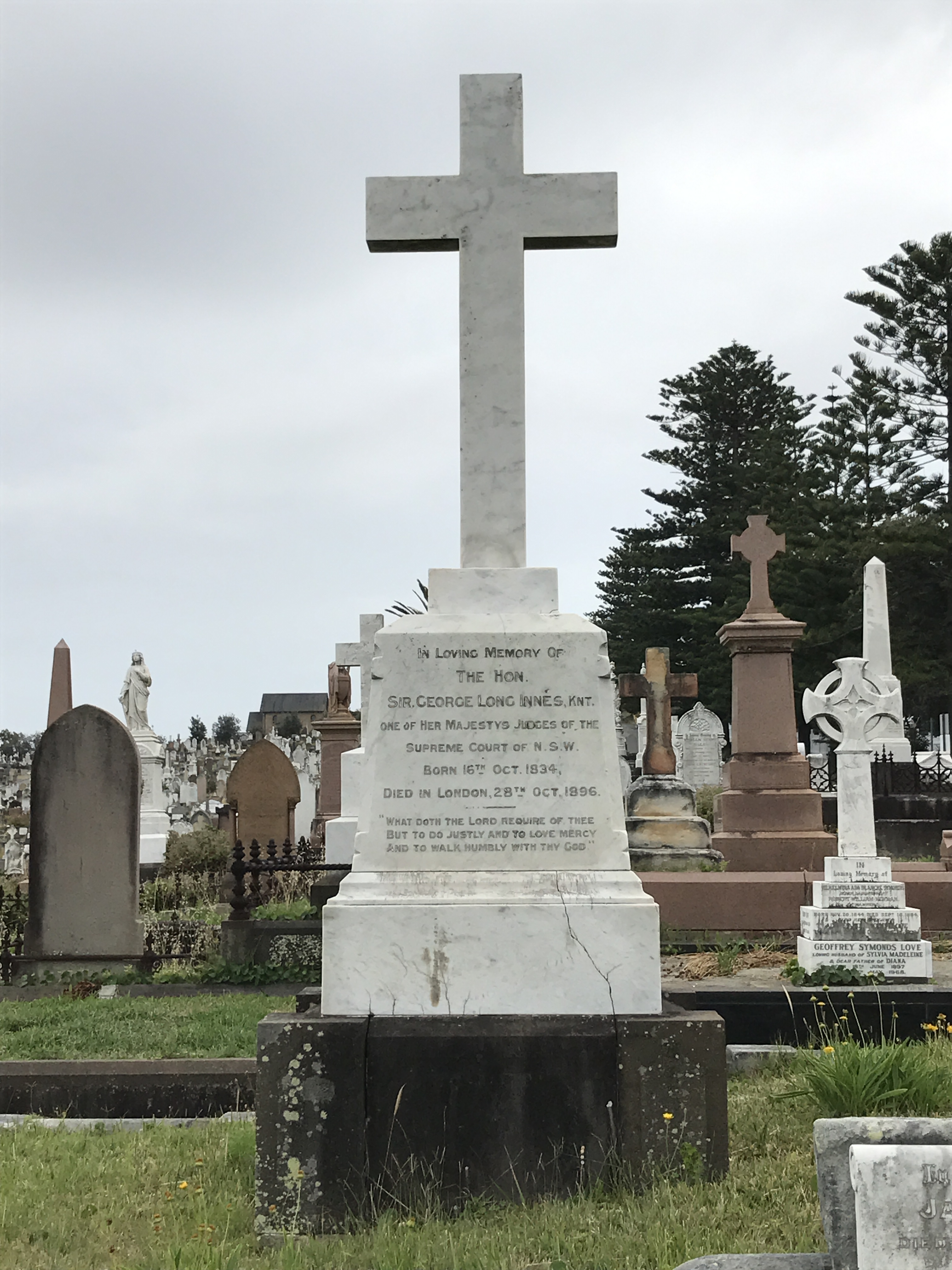
Innes grave at Waverley Cemetery.

Innes was born in Sydney, New South Wales the eldest son of Major Joseph Long Innes (superintendent of police) and his wife Elizabeth Anne, the daughter of Thomas Reibey and Mary Reibey. Innes was educated at William Timothy Cape's school and at the King's School, Parramatta. He then went to England, and entered as a student at Lincoln's Inn in November 1856; and, after winning a certificate of honour in May 1859, he was called to the bar in November of the same year.

Having returned to Australia, Innes was admitted to the New South Wales bar in 1862, and practised till 1865, when he was appointed a district judge in Queensland. This position he resigned in 1869, and returned to practise his profession in Sydney. He also went into politics, and was returned to the New South Wales Legislative Assembly for Mudgee on 7 March 1872, in May of which year he became Solicitor General in the first Parkes ministry. He resigned as the member for Mudgee to accept an appointment to the Legislative Council, appointed Representative of the Government in the Legislative Council from taking his seat on 9 September 1873. In November he was appointed Attorney General in succession to Edward Butler, without a seat in Cabinet, holding office until the break-up of the Parkes Ministry in February 1875. In the previous year he had accompanied Sir Hercules Robinson, the then Governor of New South Wales, on his special mission to Fiji, in connection with the annexation of the island to the British Crown, and was knighted in January 1875 in recognition of his legal services on that occasion. Sir George acted as Chairman of Committees in the Legislative Council till August 1880, when he succeeded Francis Suttor as Minister of Justice in the third Parkes ministry, resigning from the ministry and the Legislative Council in October 1881, on being appointed a Judge of the Supreme Court of New South Wales.

In 1865 Innes married Emily Janet née Smith, daughter of John Smith of Llanarth, Bathurst, New South Wales.

Sir George died on 28 October 1896 (aged 62) in England, survived by his wife, five sons and a daughter. One of his sons, Reginald, was also appointed to the Supreme Court.

Political offices
| Preceded by William Windeyer | Solicitor General; 1872 – 1873 | Dormant Title next held by Richard O'Connor |
| Preceded by Edward Butler | Attorney General; 1873 – 1875 | Succeeded by William Dalley |
| Preceded by Saul Samuel | Representative of the Government in the Legislative Council; 1873 – 1875 | Succeeded by Joseph Docker |
| Preceded by Francis Suttor | Minister of Justice; 1880 – 1881 | Succeeded by William Foster |
New South Wales Legislative Assembly
| Preceded by Henry Parkes | Member for Mudgee; 1872 – 1873 | Succeeded by Joseph O'Connor |
New South Wales Legislative Council
| Preceded by Joseph Docker | Chairman of Committees; 1875–1880 | Succeeded by Joseph Docker |
