= Thomas York (Australian politician) =

Australian politician

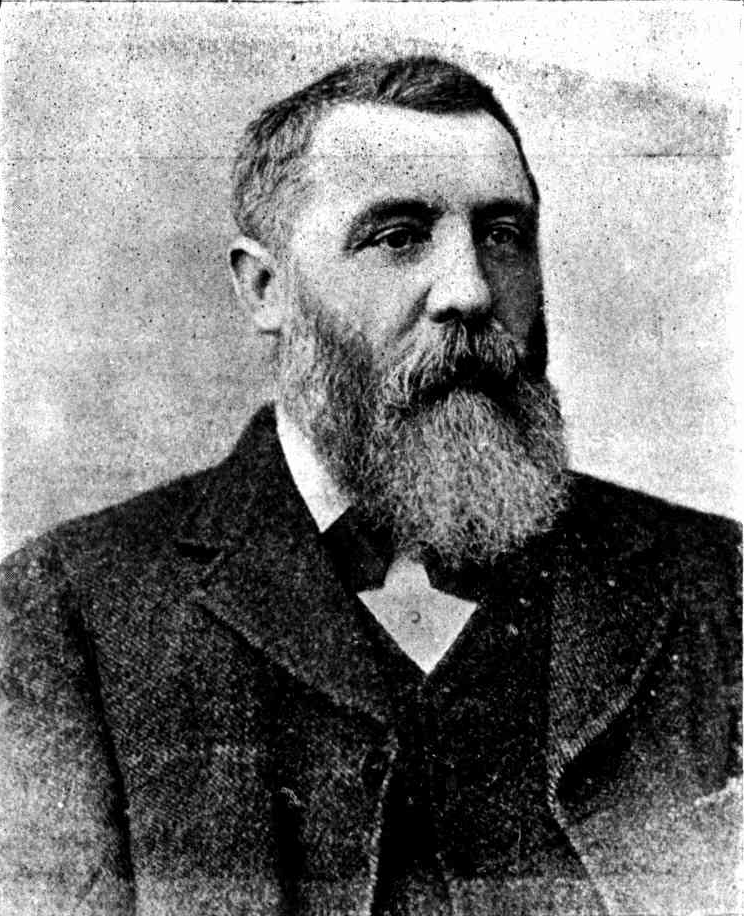

Thomas Henry York (25 June 1850 – 18 August 1910) was an Australian politician.

== Biography ==
He was born on the Snowy River near Monaro to pastoralist Henry York and Mary Murphy. He worked as a cattle buyer and butcher before moving to Wellington in 1882 to become a stock and station agent. On 8 June 1882 he married Frances Hughes, with whom he had five children. He served as a Wellington alderman and as mayor in 1886. In 1891 he was elected to the New South Wales Legislative Assembly as the Protectionist member for Wellington, but he was defeated in 1894. York died in Sydney in 1910.

New South Wales Legislative Assembly
Preceded by David Ferguson	Member for Wellington; 1891–1894	Succeeded by John Haynes
