= John Haynes (journalist) =

Politician and journalist in New South Wales, Australia

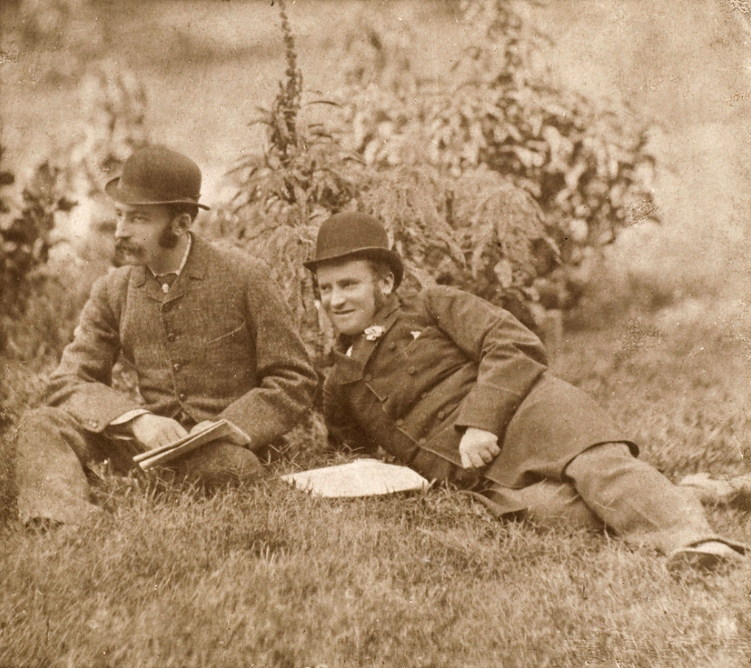
J F Archibald and John Haynes ca. 1882

John Haynes (26 April 1850 – 15 August 1917) was a parliamentarian in New South Wales, Australia for five months short of thirty years, and co-founder (1880), with J. F. Archibald, of The Bulletin.

== Early life ==
Haynes was born in Singleton, New South Wales, son of John Haynes, a schoolteacher, and his wife Margaret, née Daly. He was apprenticed as a compositor with the Morpeth Leader, and worked for several country newspapers. In 1871, he married Sarah Belford and they had five sons and one daughter. In 1873 he moved to Sydney. In 1880, he founded The Bulletin with Archibald, and in 18 months built its circulation in up to 15,000. He believed in serious provocative journalism, especially exposure articles. As the result of one article, written by William Henry Traill, they were sued by the owner of the Clontarf pleasure gardens. They refused to pay the costs of the resulting libel action and Haynes and Archibald were imprisoned for six weeks in 1882. The public raised £3,000 and they were released however they lost control of The Bulletin to Traill. Haynes maintained a minority shareholding in The Bulletin until 1885.

== Political career ==
In 1887, Haynes stood for Mudgee, as a supporter of the Free Trade Party, led by Henry Parkes, which tended to be associated with Protestants. During the campaign, he repudiated his Roman Catholic faith, which led to lasting bitterness with Protectionists. Initially unsuccessful, he was elected three months later at the by-election in May 1887. In May 1891 four free traders, Haynes, George Reid, Jack Want and Jonathan Seaver, voted against the fifth Parkes Ministry in a motion of no confidence, which was only defeated by the casting vote of the Speaker. Whilst the government survived the motion, parliament was dissolved on 6 June 1891 and Haynes held his seat of Mudgee as an independent free trader.

In 1891, Haynes was ratepayer on several Sydney addresses that were the focus of radical and even anarchist activity in Sydney (Leigh House, Active Service Brigade HQ and William McNamara's Book Depot). He married his second wife, Mary Duff, in 1892. Multi-member districts were abolished in 1894 and Haynes was elected for Wellington, which he held until that district was abolished in 1904. He continued to support free trade and decentralisation, and vigorously oppose Federation. He was a humorous but boisterous member of Parliament, and his accusations of corruption involved him in bitter arguments and physical aggression, including an attack on the Protectionist member Paddy Crick in 1893. He married his third wife, Esther Campbell, in 1899 and they had one daughter and one son. In 1904, he was narrowly defeated for Mudgee, with a margin of just 14 votes (0.2%), and continued to lose elections until elected to Willoughby in 1915, but he was defeated in 1917.

Haynes continued to pursue the allegedly corrupt politicians Crick and William Nicholas Willis through the courts, the latter all the way to South Africa. The 1906 Royal Commission on Lands Administration partly supported his allegations. He was later editor of the Newsletter, which in 1906 attacked John Norton, fellow parliamentarian and Truth publisher, as a criminal and murderer.

== Death ==
Haynes died at his residence at Alfred Street, North Sydney from heart failure supervening Influenza. He was buried on 17 August 1917 in the Presbyterian section of Rookwood Cemetery.

== See also ==
- Members of the New South Wales Legislative Assembly
- 1887–1889
- 1889–1891
- 1891–1894
- 1894–1895
- 1895–1898
- 1898–1901
- 1901–1904
- 1913–1917
- Results of New South Wales elections
- 1887 (Mudgee)
- 1887 (Mudgee by-election)
- 1889 (Mudgee)
- 1891 (Mudgee)
- 1887 (Wellington)
- 1895 (Wellington)
- 1898 (Wellington)
- 1901 (Wellington)
- 1904 (Mudgee)
- 1907 (Glebe)
- 1910 (Darlinghurst)
- 1913 (Belmore)
- 1915 (Willoughby by-election)
- 1917 (Willoughby)

New South Wales Legislative Assembly
| Preceded by Adolphus Taylor | Member for Mudgee; 1887–1894; With: Reginald Black / Robert Jones; William Wall | Succeeded by Robert Jones |
| Preceded by Thomas York | Member for Wellington; 1894–1904 | Succeeded by Abolished |
| Preceded by Edward Larkin | Member for Willoughby; 1915–1917 | Succeeded by Reginald Weaver |
