= Henry Stephen (judge) =

Australian politician

The Honourable Sir Henry Stephen

Member of the New South Wales Parliament for Mudgee
- In office 16 December 1869 – 12 December 1871
- Preceded by: Samuel Terry
- Succeeded by: Henry Parkes

Judge of the Supreme Court of New South Wales
- In office 19 May 1887 – 25 February 1904

Personal details
- Born: Matthew Henry Stephen; 5 December 1828 Hobart, Van Diemen's Land
- Died: 1 April 1920 (aged 91) Bellevue Hill NSW
- Spouse(s): Caroline Sibella née Shadforth; Florence Sophie, née Huthwaite
- Parent(s): Sir Alfred Stephen, Mary Anne, née Pasmore
- Occupation: Barrister, politician, judge

Sir Matthew Henry Stephen (5 December 1828 – 1 April 1920) was a politician and Puisne Judge in New South Wales.

The Stephen family is a prominent legal dynasty in Australia. Stephen was the eldest son of the Hon. Sir Alfred Stephen KCMG CB (1802–1894), who would later become Chief Justice of NSW and Lieutenant-Governor of NSW, and was born at Hobart, Van Diemen's Land (later named Tasmania). He was called to the New South Wales Bar in 1850, and was appointed a Queen's Counsel (QC) in 1879. He was a member of the New South Wales Legislative Assembly for Mudgee from December 1869 to December 1871, defeating Samuel Terry who had been a member for that an electoral district from 1859–1869. Stephen was a Supreme Court Judge from 1887. He married on 30 September 1854, Caroline Sibella, daughter of Henry Tudor Shadforth, formerly of the 57th Regiment, and Usher of the Black Rod, New South Wales. Sir Henry was Chancellor of the Church of England diocese of Sydney.

Stephen was senior vice-president of the New South Wales Cricket Association and from 1895, was a fellow of the Royal Colonial Institute. Stephen died at Bellevue Hill, Sydney, New South Wales, Australia on 1 April 1920, survived by his second wife (Florence Sophie, née Huthwaite) and by Caroline, his only daughter from his first marriage.

New South Wales Legislative Assembly
Preceded by Samuel Terry	Member for Mudgee; 1869–1871	Succeeded by Henry Parkes
