= Joseph O'Connor (Australian politician) =

Australian politician

Joseph Graham O'Connor (1839 – 22 July 1913) was an Irish-born Australian politician.

He was born at Dareen House in Kings County, Ireland, to tanner Stephen O'Connor and Anne Graham. He migrated to Australia in 1841 and became an apprentice wood engraver and printer. In the late 1850s he established his own business. He married Mary Earl in 1861; they had a daughter. In 1873 he was elected to the New South Wales Legislative Assembly for Mudgee, but he was defeated in 1874. He was bankrupted in 1876, and was discharged in 1884 but bankrupted again in 1890. O'Connor died at Newcastle in 1913.

New South Wales Legislative Assembly
Preceded by Joseph Innes	Member for Mudgee; 1873–1874	Succeeded by Stephen Goold
