= Electoral district of Wellington (New South Wales) =

Former state electoral district of New South Wales, Australia

Wellington was an electoral district of the Legislative Assembly in the Australian state of New South Wales, created in 1859 and named after and including Wellington. It replaced part of Wellington (County). It was abolished in 1904 due to the re-distribution of electorates following the 1903 New South Wales referendum, which required the number of members of the Legislative Assembly to be reduced from 125 to 90. The district was largely replaced by an expanded The Macquarie, while parts also went to Liverpool Plains and Mudgee.

== Members for Wellington ==
Member	Party	Term
Nicolas Hyeronimus	None	1859–1860
Silvanus Daniel	None	1860–1862
Saul Samuel	None	1862–1869
Gerald Spring	None	1869–1872
John Smith	None	1872–1877
John Shepherd	None	1877–1880
Edmund Barton	None	1880–1882
David Ferguson	None	1882–1887
David Ferguson	Protectionist	1887–1891
Thomas York	Protectionist	1891–1894
John Haynes	Free Trade	1894–1901
John Haynes	Liberal Reform	1901–1904

== Election results ==
1901 New South Wales state election: Wellington
Party	Candidate	Votes	%	±%
Liberal Reform	John Haynes	1,239	54.1	−2.9
Progressive	John McEwen	1,053	45.9	+2.9
Total formal votes		2,292	100.0	+1.5
Informal votes		0	0.0	−1.5
Turnout		2,292	61.1	−0.8
Liberal Reform hold				
