= Richard Rouse (politician) =

Australian politician

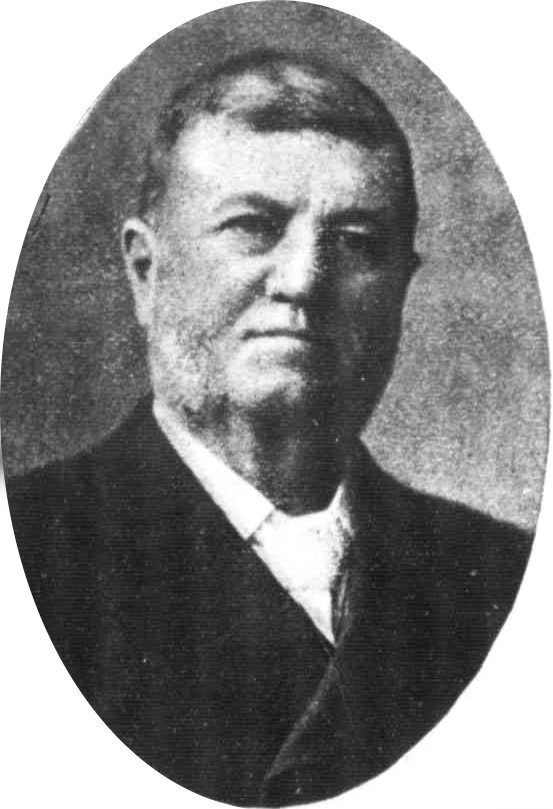
Mr Richard Rouse of Guntawang

Richard Rouse (2 January 1842 – 2 March 1903) was an Australian politician.

He was born at Guntawang near Mudgee to pastoralist Edwin Rouse and Hannah Hipkins. He was educated at Parramatta and subsequently managed his father's 4,000-acre property on the Cudgegong River, which he inherited in 1862. On 25 July 1865 he married Charlotte Emily Barnard, with whom he had four children. He was an alderman at Gulgong, serving as mayor in 1876 and from 1899 to 1903. In 1876 he was elected to the New South Wales Legislative Assembly for Mudgee, but he was defeated in 1877. He won the 1879 by-election by a single vote, but this result was overturned by the Committee of Elections and Qualifications. No reasons were published however The Sydney Morning Herald stated that it appeared that the majority of Mr Rouse was created by illegal voting. Rouse died at Guntawang in 1903.

Rouse was the grandson of Richard Rouse, a Colonial public servant and early settler.

New South Wales Legislative Assembly
Preceded by Stephen Goold	Member for Mudgee; 1876–1877	Succeeded by John Robertson
Preceded by John Robertson	Member for Mudgee; 1879	Succeeded by David Buchanan
