= Electoral district of Mudgee =

Former state electoral district of New South Wales, Australia

Mudgee was an electoral district of the Legislative Assembly in the Australian state of New South Wales first created in 1859, partly replacing Wellington and Bligh and named after and including the town of Mudgee. Following the abolition of Goldfields West in 1880, it elected three members simultaneously, with voters casting three votes and the three leading candidates being elected. In 1894 it was divided into the single-member electorates of Mudgee and Rylstone. In 1920, with the introduction of proportional representation it was absorbed into Wammerawa, along with Castlereagh and Liverpool Plains. Mudgee was recreated as an electoral district for the 1927 election. It was abolished in 1968 and replaced by Burrendong.

== Members for Mudgee ==
Single-member (1859–1880)
| Member | Party | Term | | | | | | |
|---|---|---|---|---|---|---|---|---|
| Lyttleton Bayley | None | 1859–1859 | | | | | | |
| Samuel Terry | None | 1859–1869 | | | | | | |
| Henry Stephen | None | 1869–1871 | | | | | | |
| Henry Parkes | None | 1872–1872 | | | | | | |
| Joseph Innes | None | 1872–1873 | | | | | | |
| Joseph O'Connor | None | 1873–1874 | | | | | | |
| Stephen Goold | None | 1874–1876 | | | | | | |
| Richard Rouse | None | 1876–1877 | | | | | | |
| John Robertson | None | 1877–1878 | | | | | | |
| Richard Rouse | None | 1879–1879 | | | | | | |
| David Buchanan | None | 1879–1880 | | | | | | |
Three members (1880–1894)
| Member | Party | Term | Member | Party | Term | Member | Party | Term |
| David Buchanan | None | 1880–1885 | Samuel Terry | None | 1880–1881 | Louis Beyers | None | 1880–1882 |
| David Buchanan | None | 1880–1885 | John Robertson | None | 1882–1886 | Louis Beyers | None | 1880–1882 |
| David Buchanan | None | 1880–1885 | John Robertson | None | 1882–1886 | Adolphus Taylor | None | 1882–1887 |
| Thomas Frederic Browne | None | 1885–1887 | John Robertson | None | 1882–1886 | Adolphus Taylor | None | 1882–1887 |
| Thomas Frederic Browne | None | 1885–1887 | William Wall | None | 1886–1887 | Adolphus Taylor | None | 1882–1887 |
| Reginald Black | Free Trade | 1887–1891 | William Wall | Protectionist | 1887–1894 | John Haynes | Free Trade | 1887–1894 |
| Robert Jones | Ind. Free Trade | 1891–1894 | William Wall | Protectionist | 1887–1894 | John Haynes | Free Trade | 1887–1894 |
Single-member (1894–1920)
| Member | Party | Term | | | | | | |
| Robert Jones | Free Trade | 1894–1898 | | | | | | |
| Edwin Richards | Protectionist | 1898–1901 | | | | | | |
| Edwin Richards | Progressive | 1901–1907 | | | | | | |
| Robert Jones | Liberal Reform | 1907–1910 | | | | | | |
| Bill Dunn | Labor | 1910–1920 | | | | | | |
Single-member (1927–1968)
| Member | Party | Term | | | | | | |
| Bill Dunn | Labor | 1927–1932 | | | | | | |
| David Spring | Country | 1932–1935 | | | | | | |
| Bill Dunn | Labor | 1935–1950 | | | | | | |
| Frederick Cooke | Country | 1950–1953 | | | | | | |
| Leo Nott | Labor | 1953–1968 | | | | | | |

== Election results ==
1965 New South Wales state election: Mudgee
| Party | Candidate | Votes | % | ±% |
|---|---|---|---|---|
| Labor | Leo Nott | 8,115 | 50.6 | −3.3 |
| Liberal | Richard Evans | 4,509 | 28.1 | +2.4 |
| Country | Emile Moufarrige | 3,423 | 21.3 | +3.0 |
| Total formal votes | | 16,047 | 98.9 | +0.4 |
| Informal votes | | 184 | 1.1 | −0.4 |
| Turnout | | 16,231 | 96.0 | +0.6 |
Two-party-preferred result
| Labor | Leo Nott | 8,355 | 52.1 | −3.5 |
| Liberal | Richard Evans | 7,692 | 47.9 | +3.5 |
| Labor hold | | Swing | −3.5 | |
