= Electoral results for the district of South Sydney =

Results for state seat of South Sydney, New South Wales, Australia

South Sydney, an electoral district of the Legislative Assembly in the Australian state of New South Wales was created in 1880 and abolished in 1904.

Election	Member	Party	Member	Party	Member	Party	Member	Party
1880	George Carter	None	John Davies	None	William Poole	None	George Withers	None
1882	John Harris	None	Joseph Olliffe	None	William Poole	None	George Withers	None
1885	James Toohey	None	Joseph Olliffe	None	John Davies	None	Archibald Forsyth	None
1887	James Toohey	Protectionist	Bernhard Wise	Free Trade	George Withers	Free Trade	Alban Riley	Free Trade
1887 by	James Toohey	Protectionist	Bernhard Wise	Free Trade	George Withers	Free Trade	Alban Riley	Free Trade
1889	James Toohey	Protectionist	William Traill	Protectionist	Walter Edmunds	Protectionist	James Martin	Free Trade
1891	James Toohey	Protectionist	William Traill	Protectionist	Bernhard Wise	Free Trade	James Martin	Free Trade
1893 by	William Manning	Protectionist	William Traill	Protectionist	Bernhard Wise	Free Trade	James Martin	Free Trade

== Election results ==
=== Elections in the 1890s ===
==== 1893 by-election ====
1893 South Sydney by-election Monday 13 February
Party	Candidate	Votes	%	±%
Protectionist	William Manning (elected)	1,985	41.7	
Free Trade	Edward Foxall	1,962	41.2	
Labour	Frederick Flowers	814	17.1	
Total formal votes		4,761	98.7	
Informal votes		64	1.3	
Turnout		4,825	48.9 (Note: estimate based on an electoral roll of 9,862 at the 1891 election.)	
Protectionist hold				

James Toohey (Protectionist) resigned.

==== 1891 ====
1891 New South Wales colonial election: South Sydney Wednesday 17 June
Party	Candidate	Votes	%	±%
Protectionist	William Traill (re-elected 1)	2,917	12.0	
Free Trade	Bernhard Wise (elected 2)	2,808	11.5	
Free Trade	James Martin (re-elected 3)	2,729	11.2	
Protectionist	James Toohey (re-elected 4)	2,662	10.9	
Protectionist	Walter Edmunds (defeated)	2,553	10.5	
Protectionist	George Dibbs	2,510	10.3	
Free Trade	Edward Foxall	2,237	9.2	
Free Trade	John McDonagh	2,136	8.8	
Labour	Frederick Flowers	2,017	8.3	
Labour	W Higgs	1,805	7.4	
Total formal votes		24,374	99.3	
Informal votes		179	0.7	
Turnout		6,754	68.5	
Protectionist hold 2				
Free Trade hold 1, gain 1 from Protectionist				

=== Elections in the 1880s ===
==== 1889 ====
1889 New South Wales colonial election: South Sydney Saturday 2 February
Party	Candidate	Votes	%	±%
Protectionist	William Traill (elected 1)	3,036	13.0	
Protectionist	Walter Edmunds (elected 2)	2,996	12.9	
Protectionist	James Toohey (re-elected 3)	2,934	12.6	
Free Trade	James Martin (elected 4)	2,918	12.5	
Protectionist	John Wright	2,912	12.5	
Free Trade	Bernhard Wise (defeated)	2,899	12.4	
Free Trade	Alban Riley (defeated)	2,824	12.1	
Free Trade	George Pile	2,805	12.0	
Total formal votes		23,324	99.9	
Informal votes		35	0.2	
Turnout		5,819	60.9	
Protectionist hold 1 and gain 2 from Free Trade				
Free Trade hold 1				

==== 1887 by-election ====
1887 South Sydney by-election Saturday 4 June
Party	Candidate	Votes	%	±%
Free Trade	Bernhard Wise (re-elected)	2,618	50.4	
Protectionist	William Traill	2,578	49.6	
Total formal votes		5,196	99.1	
Informal votes		49	0.9	
Turnout		5,245	53.9	
Free Trade hold				

Bernhard Wise (Free Trade) was appointed Attorney General in the fourth Parkes ministry.

==== 1887 ====
1887 New South Wales colonial election: South Sydney Saturday 5 February
Party	Candidate	Votes	%	±%
Free Trade	Alban Riley (elected 1)	3,426	20.2	
Free Trade	Bernhard Wise (elected 2)	3,067	18.1	
Free Trade	George Withers (elected 3)	2,845	16.8	
Protectionist	James Toohey (re-elected 4)	1,999	11.8	
Protectionist	John Davies (defeated)	1,394	8.2	
Protectionist	Alfred Miller	1,356	8.0	
Protectionist	Archibald Forsyth (defeated)	1,110	6.5	
Protectionist	Edward Bennett	1,085	6.4	
Independent	Michael Simmons	685	4.0	
Total formal votes		16,967	99.3	
Informal votes		126	0.7	
Turnout		6,602	68.6	

==== 1885 ====
1885 New South Wales colonial election: South Sydney Friday 16 October
Candidate	Votes	%
John Davies (elected 1)	2,444	17.0
James Toohey (elected 2)	2,309	16.1
Joseph Olliffe (re-elected 3)	2,084	14.5
Archibald Forsyth (elected 4)	2,012	14.0
George Withers (defeated)	1,738	12.1
Alfred Miller	1,563	10.9
Edward O'Sullivan	1,130	7.9
William Poole (defeated)	710	4.9
William Richardson	378	2.6
Total formal votes	14,368	98.3
Informal votes	252	1.7
Turnout	6,268	71.9

==== 1882 ====
1882 New South Wales colonial election: South Sydney Saturday 2 December
Candidate	Votes	%
Joseph Olliffe (elected 1)	2,672	21.7
John Harris (elected 2)	2,669	21.7
William Poole (re-elected 3)	1,948	15.8
George Withers (re-elected 4)	1,569	12.8
Sydney Burdekin (defeated)	1,412	11.5
John Davies (defeated)	1,345	10.9
George Carter (defeated)	682	5.6
Total formal votes	12,297	98.5
Informal votes	191	1.5
Turnout	4,714	59.6

Sydney Burdekin was a sitting member for Tamworth.

==== 1880 ====
1880 New South Wales colonial election: South Sydney Thursday 18 November
Candidate	Votes	%
John Davies (re-elected 1)	2,707	17.3
George Withers (elected 2)	2,389	15.3
George Carter (elected 3)	2,170	13.9
William Poole (elected 4)	2,158	13.8
Joseph Olliffe	2,125	13.6
Edward Horden	2,115	13.6
John Fitzgerald	1,040	6.7
Alexander Steel	764	4.9
Aaron Wheeler	144	0.9
Total formal votes	15,612	99.2
Informal votes	133	0.8
Turnout	5,648	69.5
	(new seat)	

John Davies was a sitting member for East Sydney.
