= Results of the 1885 New South Wales colonial election =

Colonial election for New South Wales, Australia in October 1885

New South Wales colonial election, 16 – 31 October 1885 Legislative Assembly << 1882–1887 >>
Enrolled voters	232,390				
Votes cast	129,888		Turnout	61.10	+4.41
Informal votes	2,669		Informal	2.01	−0.09
Summary of votes by party
Party	Primary votes	%	Swing	Seats	Change
Total	23,899			122	

The 1885 New South Wales colonial election was for 122 members representing 72 electoral districts. The election was conducted on the basis of a simple majority or first-past-the-post voting system. In this election there were 35 multi-member districts returning 85 members and 37 single member districts giving a total of 122 members. In the multi-member districts each elector could vote for as many candidates as there were vacancies. 7 districts were uncontested. There was no recognisable party structure at this election. The average number of enrolled voters per seat was 1,831, ranging from East Maitland (1,018) to Canterbury (2,630).

== Election results ==
=== Albury ===
1885 New South Wales colonial election: Albury Friday 16 October
Candidate	Votes	%
George Day (re-elected)	501	61.2
Luke Gulson	318	38.8
Total formal votes	819	96.9
Informal votes	26	3.1
Turnout	845	63.9

=== Argyle ===
1885 New South Wales colonial election: Argyle Thursday 22 October
Candidate	Votes	%
William Holborow (re-elected 1)	1,165	43.7
Francis Tait (elected 2)	784	29.4
Edward Ball	716	26.9
Total formal votes	2,665	99.8
Informal votes	6	0.2
Turnout	1,449	53.8

The sitting member Sir Henry Parkes successfully contested St Leonards.

=== Balmain ===
1885 New South Wales colonial election: Balmain Friday 16 October
Candidate	Votes	%
Jacob Garrard (re-elected 1)	2,642	27.0
Solomon Hyam (elected 2)	2,323	23.7
John Hawthorne (elected 3)	1,606	16.4
Samuel Davison	1,178	12.0
Maurice Fitzharding	1,131	11.6
Edward Buchanan	908	9.3
Total formal votes	9,788	98.7
Informal votes	126	1.3
Turnout	4,112	60.9
	(1 new seat)	

The other sitting member William Hutchinson did not contest the election.

=== Balranald ===
1885 New South Wales colonial election: Balranald Wednesday 28 October
Candidate	Votes	%
Robert Wilkinson (re-elected 1)	1,025	37.2
John Cramsie (re-elected 2)	941	34.1
Allen Lakeman	790	28.7
Total formal votes	2,756	100.0
Informal votes	0	0.0
Turnout	2,756	36.5

=== Bathurst ===
1885 New South Wales colonial election: Bathurst Friday 23 October
Candidate	Votes	%
Francis Suttor (re-elected)	866	65.2
John Meagher	463	34.8
Total formal votes	1,329	98.4
Informal votes	21	1.6
Turnout	1,350	76.1

=== The Bogan ===
1885 New South Wales colonial election: The Bogan Monday 26 October
Candidate	Votes	%
George Cass (re-elected 1)	1,347	35.6
Sir Patrick Jennings (re-elected 2)	1,271	33.6
John Kelly	1,168	30.9
Total formal votes	3,786	99.0
Informal votes	40	1.1
Turnout	2,318	50.6

=== Boorowa ===
1885 New South Wales colonial election: Boorowa Monday 19 October
Candidate	Votes	%
Thomas Slattery (re-elected)	446	75.0
Argyle McCallum	149	25.0
Total formal votes	595	97.2
Informal votes	17	2.8
Turnout	612	55.3

=== Bourke ===
1885 New South Wales colonial election: Bourke Monday 26 October
Candidate	Votes	%
William Sawers (elected 1)	934	35.4
Russell Barton (re-elected 2)	750	28.4
Richard Machattie (defeated)	523	19.8
Austin O'Grady	435	16.5
Total formal votes	2,642	99.0
Informal votes	27	1.0
Turnout	1,703	43.8

=== Braidwood ===
1885 New South Wales colonial election: Braidwood Friday 23 October
Candidate	Votes	%
Alexander Ryrie (re-elected)	453	54.1
Angus Cameron	385	45.9
Total formal votes	838	97.2
Informal votes	24	2.8
Turnout	862	60.4

Angus Cameron was a sitting member for West Sydney however he had been defeated for that seat on Tuesday 13 October.

=== Camden ===
1885 New South Wales colonial election: Camden Monday 19 October
Candidate	Votes	%
John Kidd (elected 1)	1,610	37.9
Thomas Garrett (re-elected 2)	1,422	33.5
Henry Badgery (defeated)	1,217	28.6
Total formal votes	4,249	99.4
Informal votes	24	0.6
Turnout	2,649	59.6

=== Canterbury ===
1885 New South Wales colonial election: Canterbury Friday 16 October
Candidate	Votes	%
Mark Hammond (re-elected 1)	2,760	16.1
William Henson (re-elected 2)	2,479	14.5
Septimus Stephen (re-elected 3)	2,432	14.2
William Judd (elected 4)	2,311	13.5
Alban Riley	2,178	12.7
Alexander Hutchison	1,955	11.4
Richard McCoy	1,911	11.2
Thomas Robertson	1,104	6.4
Total formal votes	17,130	99.3
Informal votes	125	0.7
Turnout	6,042	57.4
	(1 new seat)	

=== Carcoar ===
1885 New South Wales colonial election: Carcoar Friday 23 October
Candidate	Votes	%
Charles Garland (elected 1)	1,034	39.5
Ezekiel Baker (re-elected 2)	932	35.6
Francis Freehill	655	25.0
Total formal votes	2,621	99.4
Informal votes	17	0.6
Turnout	1,725	55.7

The other sitting member George Campbell did not contest the election.

=== The Clarence ===
1885 New South Wales colonial election: The Clarence Tuesday 20 October
Candidate	Votes	%
John Purves (re-elected)	719	63.1
Richard Stevenson	254	22.3
Allen Cameron	167	14.7
Total formal votes	1,140	98.3
Informal votes	20	1.7
Turnout	1,160	63.3

=== Central Cumberland ===
1885 New South Wales colonial election: Central Cumberland Thursday 29 October
Candidate	Votes	%
Andrew McCulloch (re-elected 1)	1,953	21.3
Nathaniel Bull (elected 2)	1,879	20.5
Varney Parkes (re-elected 3)	1,858	20.3
Cyrus Fuller	1,503	16.4
Charles Scrivener	973	10.6
Frank Farnell	808	8.8
Henry Statham	180	2.0
Total formal votes	9,154	98.6
Informal votes	128	1.4
Turnout	3,976	66.2
	(1 new seat)	

=== Durham ===
1885 New South Wales colonial election: Durham Monday 26 October
Candidate	Votes	%
Herbert Brown (re-elected)	737	72.6
William Johnston	278	27.4
Total formal votes	1,015	97.9
Informal votes	22	2.1
Turnout	1,037	72.4

=== East Macquarie ===
1885 New South Wales colonial election: East Macquarie Monday 26 October
Candidate	Votes	%
Sydney Smith (re-elected 1)	1,113	43.1
John Shepherd (elected 2)	587	22.7
John Hughes	528	20.4
James Tonkin	355	13.7
Total formal votes	2,583	99.2
Informal votes	21	0.8
Turnout	1,474	65.8

The other sitting member Edward Combes did not contest the election.

=== East Maitland ===
1885 New South Wales colonial election: East Maitland Friday 16 October
Candidate	Votes	%
James Brunker (re-elected)	unopposed	

=== East Sydney ===
1885 New South Wales colonial election: East Sydney Friday 16 October
Candidate	Votes	%
Edmund Barton (re-elected 1)	3,903	22.0
George Reid (elected 2)	3,399	19.2
Henry Copeland (re-elected 3)	3,208	18.1
Sydney Burdekin (re-elected 4)	2,988	16.9
George Griffiths (defeated)	1,997	11.3
Samuel Lees	1,786	10.1
George Brown	435	2.5
Total formal votes	17,716	99.5
Informal votes	97	0.5
Turnout	6,917	67.6

=== Eden ===
1885 New South Wales colonial election: Eden Thursday 29 October
Candidate	Votes	%
James Garvan (re-elected 1)	1,385	40.5
Henry Clarke (re-elected 2)	1,253	36.6
Henry Walker	785	22.9
Total formal votes	3,423	99.2
Informal votes	29	0.8
Turnout	2,156	68.7

=== Forbes ===
1885 New South Wales colonial election: Forbes Thursday 22 October
Candidate	Votes	%
Alfred Stokes (re-elected 1)	765	37.5
Walter Coonan (re-elected 2)	647	31.7
Henry Cooke	627	30.8
Total formal votes	2,039	99.4
Informal votes	13	0.6
Turnout	1,300	52.8

=== The Glebe ===
1885 New South Wales colonial election: The Glebe Friday 16 October
Candidate	Votes	%
William Wilkinson (elected 1)	1,102	33.4
John Meeks (elected 2)	1,069	32.4
Michael Chapman (defeated)	815	24.7
William Bailey	312	9.5
Total formal votes	3,298	98.7
Informal votes	45	1.4
Turnout	1,956	60.1
	(1 new seat)	

=== Glen Innes ===
1885 New South Wales colonial election: Glen Innes Monday 19 October
Candidate	Votes	%
William Fergusson (re-elected)	574	55.3
Alexander Hutchison	398	38.3
W Pomeroy	66	6.4
Total formal votes	1,038	97.7
Informal votes	25	2.4
Turnout	1,061	43.7

=== Gloucester ===
1885 New South Wales colonial election: Gloucester Saturday 24 October
Candidate	Votes	%
Robert White (re-elected)	unopposed	

=== Goulburn ===
1885 New South Wales colonial election: Goulburn Tuesday 27 October
Candidate	Votes	%
William Teece (re-elected)	unopposed	

=== Grafton ===
1885 New South Wales colonial election: Grafton Tuesday 15 October
Candidate	Votes	%
John See (re-elected)	unopposed	

=== Grenfell ===
1885 New South Wales colonial election: Grenfell Thursday 22 October
Candidate	Votes	%
Robert Vaughn (re-elected)	387	59.3
E Whelan	266	40.7
Total formal votes	653	99.4
Informal votes	4	0.6
Turnout	714	49.0

=== Gundagai ===
1885 New South Wales colonial election: Gundagai Thursday 22 October
Candidate	Votes	%
Jack Want (elected)	943	62.8
Gerard Phillips	559	37.2
Total formal votes	1,502	98.7
Informal votes	20	1.3
Turnout	1,522	64.1

The sitting member James Watson did not contest the election.

=== Gunnedah ===
1885 New South Wales colonial election: Gunnedah Monday 19 October
Candidate	Votes	%
Joseph Abbott (re-elected)	706	59.7
Ethelbert Clemesha	476	40.3
Total formal votes	1,182	96.7
Informal votes	41	3.4
Turnout	1,223	62.6

=== The Gwydir ===
1885 New South Wales colonial election: The Gwydir Friday 23 October
Candidate	Votes	%
William Campbell (re-elected)	376	54.3
Thomas Dangar (defeated)	317	45.7
Total formal votes	693	96.3
Informal votes	27	3.8
Turnout	720	36.7

Thomas Dangar was the sitting member for The Namoi.

=== Hartley ===
1885 New South Wales colonial election: Hartley Friday 16 October
Candidate	Votes	%
Walter Targett (re-elected)	591	52.5
Brisbane Doyle	535	47.5
Total formal votes	1,126	98.1
Informal votes	22	1.9
Turnout	1,148	57.3

=== The Hastings and Manning ===
1885 New South Wales colonial election: The Hastings and Manning Tuesday 20 October
Candidate	Votes	%
James Young (re-elected 1)	1,229	39.9
Charles Roberts (re-elected 2)	883	28.7
Hugh McKinnon	499	16.2
G W Tait	466	15.1
Total formal votes	3,077	99.5
Informal votes	16	0.5
Turnout	1,720	66.4

=== The Hawkesbury ===
1885 New South Wales colonial election: The Hawkesbury Monday 19 October
Candidate	Votes	%
Alexander Bowman (elected)	831	52.9
Henry McQuade (defeated)	741	47.1
Total formal votes	1,572	98.0
Informal votes	32	2.0
Turnout	1,604	76.3

=== The Hume ===
1885 New South Wales colonial election: The Hume Friday 23 October
Candidate	Votes	%
William Lyne (re-elected 1)	1,080	42.2
James Hayes (elected 2)	720	28.2
Edmund Bond	451	17.6
John Gale	306	12.0
Total formal votes	2,557	99.2
Informal votes	20	0.8
Turnout	1,379	50.8

The other sitting member Leyser Levin did not contest the election.

=== The Hunter ===
1885 New South Wales colonial election: The Hunter Friday 23 October
Candidate	Votes	%
John Burns (re-elected)	unopposed	

=== Illawarra ===
1885 New South Wales colonial election: Illawarra Monday 19 October
Candidate	Votes	%
Andrew Lysaght Sr. (elected)	617	38.0
Francis Woodward	562	34.6
William Wiley	444	27.4
Total formal votes	1,623	98.1
Informal votes	32	1.9
Turnout	1,655	70.0

The sitting member Alexander Stuart did not contest the election.

=== Inverell ===
1885 New South Wales colonial election: Inverell Monday 19 October
Candidate	Votes	%
Samuel Moore (elected)	666	57.9
Richard Murray (defeated)	484	42.1
Total formal votes	1,150	96.9
Informal votes	37	3.1
Turnout	1,187	64.6

=== Kiama ===
1885 New South Wales colonial election: Kiama Friday 16 October
Candidate	Votes	%
Harman Tarrant (re-elected)	574	61.0
Philip Holdsworth	367	39.0
Total formal votes	941	97.7
Informal votes	22	2.3
Turnout	963	61.5

=== The Macleay ===
1885 New South Wales colonial election: The Macleay Monday 19 October
Candidate	Votes	%
Robert Smith (re-elected)	1,108	69.0
Otho Dangar	499	31.1
Total formal votes	1,607	97.5
Informal votes	41	2.5
Turnout	1,648	64.0

=== Molong ===
1885 New South Wales colonial election: Molong Thursday 29 October
Candidate	Votes	%
Andrew Ross (re-elected)	695	54.8
Fergus Smith	573	45.2
Total formal votes	1,268	98.3
Informal votes	22	1.7
Turnout	1,290	69.1

=== Monaro ===
1885 New South Wales colonial election: Monaro Friday 30 October
Candidate	Votes	%
Henry Dawson (elected 1)	941	33.6
Harold Stephen (elected 2)	658	23.5
Thomas O'Mara (defeated)	447	15.9
H M Joseph	390	13.9
Henry Merrett	368	13.1
Total formal votes	2,804	99.2
Informal votes	22	0.8
Turnout	1,681	59.1

The sitting members Septimus Badgery and David Ryrie did not contest the election. Thomas O'Mara was the sitting member for Tumut.

=== Morpeth ===
1885 New South Wales colonial election: Morpeth Thursday 22 October
Candidate	Votes	%
Robert Wisdom (re-elected)	536	56.7
Robert Pierce	409	43.3
Total formal votes	945	99.8
Informal votes	2	0.2
Turnout	947	79.7

=== Mudgee ===
1885 New South Wales colonial election: Mudgee Friday 23 October
Candidate	Votes	%
Sir John Robertson (re-elected 1)	1,628	29.5
Adolphus Taylor (re-elected 2)	1,583	28.7
Thomas Browne (elected 3)	1,178	21.4
John Hurley	567	10.3
Louis Beyers	562	10.2
Total formal votes	5,518	99.6
Informal votes	22	0.4
Turnout	2,065	51.3

The other sitting member David Buchanan did not contest the election.

=== The Murray ===
1885 New South Wales colonial election: The Murray Thursday 29 October
Candidate	Votes	%
John Chanter (elected 1)	851	38.3
Robert Barbour (re-elected 2)	741	33.4
Alexander Wilson (defeated)	630	28.4
Total formal votes	2,222	99.3
Informal votes	16	0.7
Turnout	1,517	55.8

=== The Murrumbidgee ===
1885 New South Wales colonial election: The Murrumbidgee Saturday 31 October
Candidate	Votes	%
George Dibbs (elected 1)	2,171	28.0
James Gormly (elected 2)	1,920	24.7
Alexander Bolton (elected 3)	1,585	20.4
James Douglas	1,394	18.0
Frank Cowley	696	9.0
Total formal votes	7,766	99.3
Informal votes	58	0.7
Turnout	3,518	50.5
	(1 new seat)	

The sitting members Auber Jones and George Loughnan did not contest the election. George Dibbs was the Premier and a member for St Leonards where he was successfully challenged by Sir Henry Parkes on Friday 16 October.

=== The Namoi ===
1885 New South Wales colonial election: The Namoi Monday 26 October
Candidate	Votes	%
Charles Collins (elected)	743	72.1
William Wright	288	27.9
Total formal votes	1,031	99.2
Informal votes	8	0.8
Turnout	1,039	48.0

The sitting member Thomas Dangar unsuccessfully contested The Gwydir.

=== The Nepean ===
1885 New South Wales colonial election: The Nepean Friday 16 October
Candidate	Votes	%
Thomas Smith (re-elected)	838	79.6
Thomas Cross	215	20.4
Total formal votes	1,053	98.0
Informal votes	21	2.0
Turnout	1,074	62.6

=== Newcastle ===
1885 New South Wales colonial election: Newcastle Friday 16 October
Candidate	Votes	%
James Fletcher (re-elected 1)	2,483	42.2
George Lloyd (elected 2)	1,839	31.3
Total formal votes	1,557	100.0
Informal votes	5,879	0.0
Turnout	5,934	68.7

=== New England ===
1885 New South Wales colonial election: New England Saturday 31 October
Candidate	Votes	%
James Inglis (elected 1)	1,233	35.6
William Proctor (re-elected 2)	1,191	34.4
William Drew	580	16.7
William Dowel	285	8.2
Charles Givney	177	5.1
Total formal votes	3,466	98.8
Informal votes	41	1.2
Turnout	2,024	55.7

The sitting member James Farnell was appointed to the Legislative Council and did not contest the election.

=== Newtown ===
1885 New South Wales colonial election: Newtown Friday 16 October
Candidate	Votes	%
William Foster (elected 1)	1,906	23.6
James Smith (elected 2)	1,899	23.5
Frederick Gibbes (re-elected 3)	1,731	21.4
Richard Bellemey	1,154	14.3
Nicholas Hawken	726	9.0
Joseph Mitchell (defeated)	668	8.3
Total formal votes	8,084	99.1
Informal votes	71	0.9
Turnout	3,515	65.0
	(1 new seat)	

=== Northumberland ===
1885 New South Wales colonial election: Northumberland Friday 16 October
Candidate	Votes	%
Joseph Creer (elected 1)	1,662	27.1
Ninian Melville (re-elected 2)	1,539	25.1
Thomas Walker	1,287	21.0
Joseph Gorrick (defeated)	871	14.2
George Perry	598	9.8
Richard Luscombe (defeated)	176	2.9
Total formal votes	6,133	98.8
Informal votes	73	1.2
Turnout	6,206	63.6

Joseph Gorrick was the sitting member for Wollombi.

=== Orange ===
1885 New South Wales colonial election: Orange Saturday 17 October
Candidate	Votes	%
William Clarke (re-elected 1)	1,049	40.9
Thomas Dalton (re-elected 2)	882	34.4
Valentine Heaton	631	24.6
Total formal votes	2,562	98.8
Informal votes	31	1.2
Turnout	2,593	48.8

=== Paddington ===
1885 New South Wales colonial election: Paddington Friday 16 October
Candidate	Votes	%
John Neild (elected 1)	2,033	20.6
William Trickett (re-elected 2)	1,628	16.5
Robert Butcher (re-elected 3)	1,514	15.3
John McLaughlin (defeated)	1,487	15.0
Alfred Allen	1,451	14.7
Charles Hellmrich	1,363	13.8
Charles Cansdell	418	4.2
Total formal votes	9,894	98.3
Informal votes	176	1.8
Turnout	4,356	64.7

=== Parramatta ===
1885 New South Wales colonial election: Parramatta Friday 16 October
Candidate	Votes	%
Hugh Taylor (re-elected)	922	69.8
William Ferris	399	30.2
Total formal votes	1,321	97.0
Informal votes	41	3.0
Turnout	1,362	72.6

=== Patrick's Plains ===
1885 New South Wales colonial election: Patrick's Plains Wednesday 28 October
Candidate	Votes	%
Albert Gould (re-elected)	676	55.2
William Browne	548	44.8
Total formal votes	1,224	99.0
Informal votes	12	1.0
Turnout	1,236	78.6

=== Queanbeyan ===
1885 New South Wales colonial election: Queanbeyan Friday 23 October
Candidate	Votes	%
Edward O'Sullivan (elected)	304	32.5
Percy Hodgkinson	209	22.3
William Affleck	193	20.6
John Wright	164	17.5
William O'Neill	66	7.1
Total formal votes	936	98.0
Informal votes	19	2.0
Turnout	955	49.3

The sitting member George De Salis did not contest the election.

=== Redfern ===
1885 New South Wales colonial election: Redfern Friday 16 October
Candidate	Votes	%
John Sutherland (re-elected 1)	2,806	25.3
Arthur Renwick (elected 2)	2,137	19.3
Thomas Williamson (elected 3)	2,009	18.1
William Stephens	1,861	16.8
Francis Wright (defeated)	1,232	11.1
John Martin	1,042	9.4
Total formal votes	11,087	98.9
Informal votes	125	1.1
Turnout	5,325	69.4

The other sitting member Alfred Fremlin did not contest the election.

=== The Richmond ===
1885 New South Wales colonial election: The Richmond Wednesday 28 October
Candidate	Votes	%
Thomas Ewing (elected 1)	1,922	40.9
Patrick Hogan (elected 2)	1,454	30.9
Frederick Crouch	1,280	27.2
George Dibbs	46	1.0
Total formal votes	4,702	99.2
Informal votes	40	0.8
Turnout	2,796	59.9
	(1 new seat)	

The sitting member Samuel Gray did not contest the election

=== Shoalhaven ===
1885 New South Wales colonial election: Shoalhaven Monday 19 October
Candidate	Votes	%
Frederick Humphery (re-elected)	850	54.6
William Martin	706	45.4
Total formal votes	1,556	98.6
Informal votes	22	1.4
Turnout	1,578	78.0

=== South Sydney ===
1885 New South Wales colonial election: South Sydney Friday 16 October
Candidate	Votes	%
John Davies (elected 1)	2,444	17.0
James Toohey (elected 2)	2,309	16.1
Joseph Olliffe (re-elected 3)	2,084	14.5
Archibald Forsyth (elected 4)	2,012	14.0
George Withers (defeated)	1,738	12.1
Alfred Miller	1,563	10.9
Edward O'Sullivan	1,130	7.9
William Poole (defeated)	710	4.9
William Richardson	378	2.6
Total formal votes	14,368	98.3
Informal votes	252	1.7
Turnout	6,268	71.9

The other sitting member John Harris did not contest the election.

=== St Leonards ===
1885 New South Wales colonial election: St Leonards Friday 16 October
Candidate	Votes	%
Sir Henry Parkes (re-elected 1)	1,506	33.4
Isaac Ives (re-elected 2)	1,149	25.5
George Dibbs (defeated)	1,039	23.0
Edward Clark	819	18.2
Total formal votes	4,513	98.7
Informal votes	60	1.3
Turnout	3,008	70.5

Sir Henry Parkes was the member for Argyle who contested St Leonards to successfully challenge the Premier George Dibbs. Dibbs was returned to Parliament by successfully contesting The Murrumbidgee on Saturday 31 October.

=== Tamworth ===
1885 New South Wales colonial election: Tamworth Wednesday 21 October
Candidate	Votes	%
Robert Levien (re-elected 1)	882	29.4
Michael Burke (elected 2)	772	25.8
John Gill (defeated)	707	23.6
William Dowel	402	13.4
A Sampson	235	7.8
Total formal votes	2,998	98.9
Informal votes	32	1.1
Turnout	1,676	58.4

=== Tenterfield ===
1885 New South Wales colonial election: Tenterfield Friday 30 October
Candidate	Votes	%
Charles Lee (re-elected)	unopposed	

=== Tumut ===
1885 New South Wales colonial election: Tumut Friday 30 October
Candidate	Votes	%
Travers Jones (elected)	446	36.9
Nathaniel Emanuel	438	36.2
James Hoskins	326	26.9
Total formal votes	1,210	98.8
Informal votes	15	1.2
Turnout	1,233	66.9

The sitting member Thomas O'Mara unsuccessfully contested Monaro.

=== The Upper Hunter ===
1885 New South Wales colonial election: The Upper Hunter Monday 26 October
Candidate	Votes	%
Robert Fitzgerald (elected 1)	910	37.3
Thomas Hungerford (elected 2)	776	31.8
John McElhone (defeated)	756	31.0
Total formal votes	2,442	99.5
Informal votes	12	0.5
Turnout	1,591	56.4

The other sitting member John McLaughlin did not contest the election.

=== Wellington ===
1885 New South Wales colonial election: Wellington Tuesday 20 October
Candidate	Votes	%
David Ferguson (re-elected)	458	58.9
Paddy Crick	258	33.2
E Bennett	61	7.9
Total formal votes	777	98.6
Informal votes	11	1.4
Turnout	787	59.8

=== Wentworth ===
1885 New South Wales colonial election: Wentworth Saturday 31 October
Candidate	Votes	%
Edward Quin (re-elected)	unopposed	
William MacGregor (elected)	unopposed	
	(1 new seat)	

=== West Macquarie ===
1885 New South Wales colonial election: West Macquarie Thursday 22 October
Candidate	Votes	%
Lewis Lloyd (re-elected)	355	56.3
James Fitzpatrick	276	43.7
Total formal votes	631	98.0
Informal votes	13	2.0
Turnout	644	59.5

=== West Maitland ===
1885 New South Wales colonial election: West Maitland Friday 16 October
Candidate	Votes	%
Richard Thompson (elected)	632	54.5
Walter Edmunds	527	45.5
Total formal votes	1,159	97.0
Informal votes	36	3.0
Turnout	1,195	72.6

The sitting member Henry Cohen did not contest the election.

=== West Sydney ===
1885 New South Wales colonial election: West Sydney Friday 16 October
Candidate	Votes	%
Alexander Kethel (elected 1)	3,515	21.0
Daniel O'Connor (re-elected 2)	3,057	18.3
Francis Abigail (re-elected 3)	3,043	18.2
John Young (elected 4)	2,870	17.2
Angus Cameron (defeated)	2,388	14.3
George Merriman (defeated)	1,853	11.1
Total formal votes	16,726	99.2
Informal votes	140	0.8
Turnout	7,140	68.4

=== Wollombi ===
1885 New South Wales colonial election: Wollombi Saturday 31 October
Candidate	Votes	%
Lyall Scott (elected)	592	62.8
Walter Vivian	257	27.3
George Anderson	69	7.3
A S Jaques	25	2.7
Total formal votes	943	99.0
Informal votes	10	1.1
Turnout	953	57.0

The sitting member Joseph Gorrick unsuccessfully contested Northumberland.

=== Yass Plains ===
1885 New South Wales colonial election: Yass Plains Monday 19 October
Candidate	Votes	%
Louis Heydon (re-elected)	601	55.4
Richard Colonna-Close	483	44.6
Total formal votes	1,084	96.1
Informal votes	44	3.9
Turnout	1,128	61.4

=== Young ===
1885 New South Wales colonial election: Young Thursday 22 October
Candidate	Votes	%
Gerald Spring (re-elected 1)	1,270	38.6
William Watson (elected 2)	1,011	30.7
James Mackinnon (defeated)	1,009	30.7
Total formal votes	3,290	100.0
Informal votes	0	0.0
Turnout	3,290	47.0

== See also ==
- Candidates of the 1885 New South Wales colonial election
- Members of the New South Wales Legislative Assembly, 1885–1887
