= Candidates of the 1885 New South Wales colonial election =

This is a list of candidates for the 1885 New South Wales colonial election. The election was held from 16 October to 31 October 1885.

This was the last election at which there was no recognisable party structure.

== Retiring members ==
- David Buchanan MLA (Mudgee)
- George Campbell MLA (Carcoar)
- Henry Cohen MLA (West Maitland)
- Edward Combes MLA (East Macquarie)
- George De Salis MLA (Queanbeyan)
- James Farnell MLA (New England) — appointed to the Legislative Council
- Alfred Fremlin MLA (Redfern)
- Samuel Gray MLA (Richmond)
- John Harris MLA (South Sydney)
- William Hutchinson MLA (Balmain)
- Auber Jones MLA (Murrumbidgee)
- Leyser Levin MLA (Hume)
- George Loughnan MLA (Murrumbidgee)
- William McCourt MLA (Camden)
- David Ryrie MLA (Monaro)
- Sir Alexander Stuart MLA (Illawarra)
- James Watson MLA (Gundagai)

== Legislative Assembly ==
Sitting members are shown in bold text. Successful candidates are highlighted.

Electorates are arranged chronologically from the day the poll was held. Because of the sequence of polling, some sitting members who were defeated in their constituencies were then able to contest other constituencies later in the polling period. On the second occasion, these members are shown in italic text.

Electorate	Successful candidates	Unsuccessful candidates
Friday 16 October 1885
Albury	**George Day**	Luke Gulson
Balmain	**Jacob Garrard**; John Hawthorne; Solomon Hyam	Edward Buchanan; Samuel Davison; Maurice Fitzharding
Canterbury	**Mark Hammond**; **William Henson**; William Judd; **Septimus Stephen**	Alexander Hutchison; Richard McCoy; Alban Riley; Thomas Robertson
East Maitland	**James Brunker**	
East Sydney	**Edmund Barton**; **Sydney Burdekin**; **Henry Copeland**; George Reid	George Brown; **George Griffiths**; Samuel Lees
Glebe	John Meeks; William Wilkinson	William Bailey; **Michael Chapman**
Hartley	**Walter Targett**	Brisbane Doyle
Kiama	**Harman Tarrant**	Philip Holdsworth
Nepean	**Thomas Smith**	Thomas Cross
Newcastle	**James Fletcher**; George Lloyd	**James Ellis**
Newtown	William Foster; **Frederick Gibbes**; James Smith	Richard Bellemey; Nicholas Hawken; **Joseph Mitchell**
Northumberland	Joseph Creer; **Ninian Melville**	**Joseph Gorrick**; **Richard Luscombe**; George Perry; Thomas Walker
Paddington	**Robert Butcher**; John Neild; **William Trickett**	Alfred Allen; Charles Cansdell; Charles Hellmrich; **John McLaughlin**
Parramatta	**Hugh Taylor**	William Ferris
Redfern	Arthur Renwick; **John Sutherland**; Thomas Williamson	John Martin; William Stephen; **Francis Wright**
St Leonards	**Isaac Ives**; **Sir Henry Parkes**	Edward Clark; **George Dibbs**
South Sydney	John Davies; Archibald Forsyth; **Joseph Olliffe**; James Toohey	Alfred Miller; Edward O'Sullivan; **William Poole**; William Richardson; **George Withers**
West Maitland	Richard Thompson	Walter Edmunds
West Sydney	**Francis Abigail**; Alexander Kethel; **Daniel O'Connor**; John Young	**Angus Cameron**; **George Merriman**
Saturday 17 October 1885
Orange	**William Clarke**; **Thomas Dalton**	Valentine Heaton
Monday 19 October 1885
Boorowa	**Thomas Slattery**	Argyle McCallum
Camden	**Thomas Garrett**; John Kidd	**Henry Badgery**
Glen Innes	**William Fergusson**	Alexander Hutchison; W O Pomeroy
Gunnedah	**Joseph Abbott**	Ethelbert Clemesha
Hawkesbury	Alexander Bowman	**Henry McQuade**
Illawarra	Andrew Lysaght	William Wiley; Francis Woodward
Inverell	Samuel Moore	**Richard Murray**
Macleay	**Robert Smith**	Otho Dangar
Shoalhaven	**Frederick Humphery**	
Yass Plains	**Louis Heydon**	Richard Colonna-Close
Tuesday 20 October 1885
Clarence	**John Purves**	Allen Cameron; Richard Stevenson
Grafton	**John See**	
Hastings and Manning	**Charles Roberts**; **James Young**	Hugh McKinnon; G W Tait
Wellington	**David Ferguson**	E Bennett; Paddy Crick
Wednesday 21 October 1885
Tamworth	Michael Burke; **Robert Levien**	William Dowel; **John Gill**; A H Sampson
Thursday 22 October 1885
Argyle	**William Holborow**; Francis Tait	Edward Ball
Forbes	**Walter Coonan**; **Alfred Stokes**	Henry Cooke
Grenfell	**Robert Vaughn**	E B Whelan
Gundagai	Jack Want	Gerard Phillips
Morpeth	**Robert Wisdom**	Robert Pierce
West Macquarie	**Lewis Lloyd**	James Fitzpatrick
Young	**Gerald Spring**; William Watson	**James Mackinnon**
Friday 23 October 1885
Bathurst	**Francis Suttor**	John Meagher
Braidwood	**Alexander Ryrie**	Angus Cameron
Carcoar	**Ezekiel Baker**; Charles Garland	Francis Freehill
Gwydir	**William Campbell**	**Thomas Dangar**
Hume	James Hayes; **William Lyne**	Edmund Bond; John Gale
Hunter	**John Burns**	
Mudgee	Thomas Browne; **Sir John Robertson**; **Adolphus Taylor**	Louis Beyers; John Hurley
Queanbeyan	Edward O'Sullivan	William Affleck; Percy Hodgkinson; William O'Neill; John Wright
Saturday 24 October 1885
Gloucester	**Robert White**	
Monday 26 October 1885
Bogan	**George Cass**; **Sir Patrick Jennings**	John Kelly
Bourke	**Russell Barton**; William Sawers	**Richard Machattie**; Austin O'Grady
Durham	**Herbert Brown**	William Johnston
East Macquarie	**Sydney Smith**; John Shepherd	John Hughes; James Tonkin
Namoi	Charles Collins	William Wright
Upper Hunter	Robert Fitzgerald; Thomas Hungerford	**John McElhone**
Tuesday 27 October 1885
Goulburn	**William Teece**	
Wednesday 28 October 1885
Balranald	**John Cramsie**; **Robert Wilkinson**	Allen Lakeman
Patrick's Plains	**Albert Gould**	William Browne
Richmond	Thomas Ewing; Patrick Hogan	Frederick Crouch; George Dibbs
Thursday 29 October 1885
Central Cumberland	Nathaniel Bull; **Andrew McCulloch**; **Varney Parkes**	Frank Farnell; Cyrus Fuller; Charles Scrivener; Henry Statham
Eden	**Henry Clarke**; **James Garvan**	Henry Walker
Molong	**Andrew Ross**	Fergus Smith
Murray	**Robert Barbour**; John Chanter	**Alexander Wilson**
Friday 30 October 1885
Monaro	Henry Dawson; Harold Stephen	H M Joseph; Henry Merrett; **Thomas O'Mara**
Tenterfield	**Charles Lee**	
Tumut	Travers Jones	Nathaniel Emanuel; James Hoskins
Saturday 31 October 1885
Murrumbidgee	Alexander Bolton; George Dibbs; James Gormly	Frank Cowley; James Douglas
New England	James Inglis; **William Proctor**	William Dowel; William Drew; Charles Givney
Wentworth	William MacGregor; **Edward Quin**	
Wollombi	Lyall Scott	George Anderson; A S Jaques; Walter Vivian

== See also ==
- Members of the New South Wales Legislative Assembly, 1885–1887
