= Results of the 1880 New South Wales colonial election =

Colonial election for New South Wales, Australia in 1880

New South Wales colonial election, 17 November – 2 December 1880 Legislative Assembly << 1877–1882 >>
Enrolled voters					
Votes cast	178,807		Turnout	61.94	+13.63
Informal votes	2,001		Informal	1.96	+0.95
Summary of votes by party
Party	Primary votes	%	Swing	Seats	Change
Total	178,807			108	

The 1880 New South Wales colonial election was for 108 members representing 72 electoral districts. The election was conducted on the basis of a simple majority or first-past-the-post voting system. In this election there were 29 multi-member districts returning 68 members and 43 single member districts. In the multi-member districts each elector could vote for as many candidates as there were vacancies. 14 districts were uncontested. There was no recognisable party structure at this election. The average number of enrolled voters per seat was 1,549 for a country seat and 2,361 for an urban one, ranging from East Maitland (966) to Bourke (3,478).

The electoral boundaries were established under the Electoral Act 1880 (NSW) which was the first major redistribution since 1858 in which 12 districts were abolished, (Note: The four districts that did not have a residential qualification were abolished, Goldfields North, Goldfields South, Goldfields West and University of Sydney plus the districts of The Hastings, The Lachlan, Liverpool Plains, The Lower Hunter, Narellan, The Paterson, The Williams and Windsor.) and 23 new districts were created. (Note: The new districts were Albury, Balmain, Boorowa, Bourke, Durham, Forbes, Glen Innes, Gloucester, Grafton, Grenfell, Gundagai, Gunnedah, The Hastings and Manning, Inverell, The Macleay, Molong, The Namoi, Redfern, The Richmond, South Sydney, Tamworth, Tumut, Wentworth and Young.) an overall increase in the number of districts from 61 to 72, and an increase in the number of members from 73 to 108.

== Election results ==
=== Albury ===
1880 New South Wales colonial election: Albury Saturday 20 November
Candidate	Votes	%
George Day (re-elected)	unopposed	
	(new seat)	

George Day was the sitting member for The Hume

=== Argyle ===
1880 New South Wales colonial election: Argyle Friday 26 November
Candidate	Votes	%
William Holborow (elected 1)	1,026	27.5
Phillip G. Myers (elected 2)	992	26.6
Louis Heydon	780	20.9
John Walsh	683	18.3
William Connolly	254	6.8
Total formal votes	3,735	99.2
Informal votes	29	0.8
Turnout	1,976	71.3
	(1 new seat)	

The sitting member William Davies did not contest the election.

=== Balmain ===
1880 New South Wales colonial election: Balmain Friday 19 November
Candidate	Votes	%
Jacob Garrard (elected)	789	34.2
John Taylor	777	33.7
Albert Elkington	568	24.6
Charles Mossman	173	7.5
Total formal votes	2,307	96.8
Informal votes	76	3.2
Turnout	2,383	74.0
	(new seat)	

The Sydney Daily Telegraph reported that 60 of the informal votes had written "I Vote for Taylor" on them, where Jacob Garrard won the election by only 12 votes.

=== Balranald ===
1880 New South Wales colonial election: Balranald Thursday 2 December
Candidate	Votes	%
John Cramsie (elected 1)	1,039	35.8
Robert Wilkinson (elected 2)	1,002	34.5
James Warby	482	16.6
Total formal votes	378	100.0
Informal votes	2,901	0.0
Turnout	2,921	49.9
	(1 new seat)	

The sitting member Colin Simson did not contest the election.

=== Bathurst ===
1880 New South Wales colonial election: Bathurst Friday 19 November
Candidate	Votes	%
Francis Suttor (re-elected)	641	58.9
William Butler	447	41.1
Total formal votes	1,088	97.6
Informal votes	27	2.4
Turnout	1,115	78.2

=== The Bogan ===
1880 New South Wales colonial election: The Bogan Tuesday 30 November
Candidate	Votes	%
Patrick Jennings (elected 1)	1,394	42.1
George Cass (elected 2)	750	22.6
William Forlonge	671	20.3
William Shorter	498	15.0
Total formal votes	3,313	98.8
Informal votes	42	1.3
Turnout	1,842	56.2
	(1 new seat)	

The Bogan lost part of the district to the new seat of Forbes. The sitting member Walter Coonan unsuccessfully contested Forbes.

=== Boorowa ===
1880 New South Wales colonial election: Boorowa Monday 29 November
Candidate	Votes	%
Thomas Slattery (elected)	456	63.9
Albert Middleton	258	36.1
Total formal votes	714	97.7
Informal votes	17	2.3
Turnout	731	52.7
	(new seat)	

=== Bourke ===
1880 New South Wales colonial election: Bourke Tuesday 30 November
Candidate	Votes	%
Russell Barton (elected)	738	56.6
Joseph Olliffe	566	43.4
Total formal votes	1,304	98.0
Informal votes	27	2.0
Turnout	1,331	35.5
	(new seat)	

Joseph Olliffe had already unsuccessfully contested East Sydney.

=== Braidwood ===
1880 New South Wales colonial election: Braidwood Monday 29 November
Candidate	Votes	%
Alexander Ryrie (elected)	609	55.4
Edward Greville (defeated)	491	44.6
Total formal votes	1,100	95.9
Informal votes	47	4.1
Turnout	1,147	73.3

=== Camden ===
1880 New South Wales colonial election: Camden Saturday 20 November
Candidate	Votes	%
John Kidd (elected 1)	1,386	32.1
Thomas Garrett (re-elected 2)	1,368	31.7
William McCourt	686	15.9
Joseph Leary (defeated)	567	13.1
Thomas Robertson	314	7.3
Total formal votes	4,321	98.9
Informal votes	50	1.1
Turnout	2,777	80.8

The other siting member Arthur Onslow did not contest the election. Joseph Leary was the sitting member for The Murrumbidgee.

=== Canterbury ===
1880 New South Wales colonial election: Canterbury Monday 22 November
Candidate	Votes	%
William Pigott (elected 1)	2,513	42.1
William Henson (elected 2)	1,380	23.1
Alfred Allen	672	11.3
Thomas Courtney	622	10.4
George Pile	493	8.3
Myles McRae	232	3.9
Total formal votes	56	100.0
Informal votes	5,968	0.0
Turnout	5,993	55.5

One sitting member John Lucas did not contest the election. The other sitting member Sir Henry Parkes successfully contested East Sydney.

=== Carcoar ===
1880 New South Wales colonial election: Carcoar Monday 22 November
Candidate	Votes	%
Ezekiel Baker (re-elected 1)	1,320	43.6
Andrew Lynch (re-elected 2)	883	29.2
William Suttor	825	27.3
Total formal votes	3,028	99.1
Informal votes	29	1.0
Turnout	1,724	64.6
	(1 new seat)	

Ezekiel Baker was the sitting member for the abolished district of Goldfields South.

=== The Clarence ===
1880 New South Wales colonial election: The Clarence Tuesday 23 November
Candidate	Votes	%
John Purves (elected)	unopposed	

The Clarence lost part of the district to Grafton and part to The Richmond. The sitting member Charles Fawcett successfully contested The Richmond.

=== Central Cumberland ===
1880 New South Wales colonial election: Central Cumberland Monday 22 November
Candidate	Votes	%
John Lackey (re-elected 1)	1,470	41.0
Andrew McCulloch (re-elected 2)	1,350	37.6
Thomas Wearne	770	21.5
Total formal votes	3,590	99.0
Informal votes	36	1.0
Turnout	2,216	62.9

=== Durham ===
1880 New South Wales colonial election: Durham Monday 22 November
Candidate	Votes	%
Herbert Brown (re-elected)	660	63.2
William Johnston (defeated)	385	36.8
Total formal votes	1,045	98.5
Informal votes	16	1.5
Turnout	1,061	72.1
	(new seat)	

Durham replaced all of the abolished district of The Paterson and part of the abolished district of The Williams. Herbert Brown was the member for The Paterson and William Johnston was the member for The Williams.

=== East Macquarie ===
1880 New South Wales colonial election: East Macquarie Tuesday 23 November
Candidate	Votes	%
Edward Combes (re-elected 1)	903	41.7
Edmund Webb (re-elected 2)	737	34.0
Sydney Smith	526	24.3
Total formal votes	2,166	99.4
Informal votes	13	0.6
Turnout	1,280	62.3

=== East Maitland ===
1880 New South Wales colonial election: East Maitland Wednesday 24 November
Candidate	Votes	%
James Brunker (elected)	unopposed	

The sitting member Henry Badgery successfully contested Monaro.

=== East Sydney ===
1880 New South Wales colonial election: East Sydney Wednesday 17 November
Candidate	Votes	%
George Reid (elected 1)	3,413	19.0
Arthur Renwick (re-elected 2)	3,295	18.3
Henry Dangar (elected 3)	3,102	17.3
Sir Henry Parkes (re-elected 4)	2,770	15.4
Charles Roberts	2,295	12.8
Samuel Lees	1,385	7.7
Charles Moore	1,216	6.8
Isaac Josephson	507	2.8
Total formal votes	17,983	99.3
Informal votes	120	0.7
Turnout	5,488	61.0

Of the sitting members, James Greenwood and John Macintosh did not contest the election and John Davies successfully contested South Sydney. Sir Henry Parkes was a sitting member for Canterbury.

=== Eden ===
1880 New South Wales colonial election: Eden Friday 26 November
Candidate	Votes	%
Henry Clarke (re-elected 1)	1,099	40.5
James Garvan (elected 2)	899	33.1
W Manning	375	13.8
Alexander Hutchison	344	12.7
Total formal votes	2,717	99.2
Informal votes	22	0.8
Turnout	2,739	53.5
	(1 new seat)	

=== Forbes ===
1880 New South Wales colonial election: Forbes Saturday 27 November
Candidate	Votes	%
Henry Cooke (elected 1)	675	23.6
John Bodel (elected 2)	638	22.3
Walter Coonan (defeated)	631	22.0
Alfred Stokes	499	17.4
George Moore	336	11.7
Baker, St Baker	84	2.9
Total formal votes	2,863	99.0
Informal votes	30	1.0
Turnout	1,630	60.3
	(new seat)	

Forbes replaced part of The Bogan. Walter Coonan was the sitting member for The Bogan.

=== The Glebe ===
1880 New South Wales colonial election: The Glebe Thursday 18 November
Candidate	Votes	%
George Allen (re-elected)	812	72.4
James Graham	309	27.6
Total formal votes	1,121	97.1
Informal votes	34	2.9
Turnout	1,155	58.7

=== Glen Innes ===
1880 New South Wales colonial election: Glen Innes Wednesday 24 November
Candidate	Votes	%
William Fergusson (elected)	514	54.3
Edward Bennett	432	45.7
Total formal votes	946	98.3
Informal votes	16	1.7
Turnout	972	61.7
	(new seat)	

Glen Innes was created from the northern part of New England.

=== Gloucester ===
1880 New South Wales colonial election: Gloucester Saturday 27 November
Candidate	Votes	%
Archibald Jacob (re-elected)	471	50.2
Charles Readett	468	49.8
Total formal votes	939	97.6
Informal votes	23	2.4
Turnout	962	63.0
	(new seat)	

Archibald Jacob was the member for the abolished district of The Lower Hunter.

=== Goulburn ===
1880 New South Wales colonial election: Goulburn Thursday 18 November
Candidate	Votes	%
William Teece (re-elected)	unopposed	

=== Grafton ===
1880 New South Wales colonial election: Grafton Friday 26 November
Candidate	Votes	%
John See (elected)	636	55.4
Richard Stevenson	513	44.7
Total formal votes	1,149	97.2
Informal votes	33	2.8
Turnout	1,182	62.3
	(new seat)	

Grafton was created from part of The Clarence.

=== Grenfell ===
1880 New South Wales colonial election: Grenfell Monday 29 November
Candidate	Votes	%
Robert Vaughn (elected)	421	49.2
George Greene	294	34.4
J Donkin	141	16.5
Total formal votes	856	98.5
Informal votes	13	1.5
Turnout	869	53.8
	(new seat)	

Grenfell partly replaced the abolished district of The Lachlan.

=== Gundagai ===
1880 New South Wales colonial election: Gundagai Tuesday 30 November
Candidate	Votes	%
William Forster (elected)	600	52.2
Frederick Pinkstone	303	26.4
Samuel Swift	246	21.4
Total formal votes	1,149	98.5
Informal votes	17	1.5
Turnout	1,167	66.7
	(new seat)	

Gundagai partly replaced the abolished district of The Lachlan.

=== Gunnedah ===
1880 New South Wales colonial election: Gunnedah Monday 29 November
Candidate	Votes	%
Joseph Abbott (elected)	714	61.1
Thomas Browne	454	38.9
Total formal votes	1,168	97.5
Informal votes	30	2.5
Turnout	1,198	62.5
	(new seat)	

=== The Gwydir ===
1880 New South Wales colonial election: The Gwydir Tuesday 30 November
Candidate	Votes	%
William Campbell (elected)	unopposed	

The sitting member Thomas Dangar successfully contested The Namoi.

=== Hartley ===
1880 New South Wales colonial election: Hartley Friday 26 November
Candidate	Votes	%
Robert Abbott (elected)	396	44.0
John Hurley (defeated)	361	40.1
Walter Targett	143	15.9
Total formal votes	900	96.6
Informal votes	32	3.4
Turnout	932	55.6

=== The Hastings and Manning ===
1880 New South Wales colonial election: The Hastings and Manning Saturday 27 November
Candidate	Votes	%
James Young (elected 1)	897	30.6
Joseph Andrews (elected 2)	792	27.0
Daniel Macquarie	428	14.6
Charles McDonnell	383	13.1
William Gill	214	7.3
Henry Zions	135	4.6
Total formal votes	82	100.0
Informal votes	2,931	0.0
Turnout	2,961	64.2
	(new seat)	

Replaced the abolished district of The Hastings. The sitting member Robert Smith successfully contested The Macleay.

=== The Hawkesbury ===
1880 New South Wales colonial election: The Hawkesbury Friday 26 November
Candidate	Votes	%
Alexander Bowman (re-elected)	866	54.1
Henry McQuade (defeated)	736	45.9
Total formal votes	1,602	98.2
Informal votes	29	1.8
Turnout	1,631	82.8
	(1 less seat)	

The other sitting member Henry Moses did not contest the election. Henry McQuade was the sitting member for the abolished district of Windsor.

=== The Hume ===
1880 New South Wales colonial election: The Hume Monday 29 November
Candidate	Votes	%
William Lyne (elected 1)	900	34.1
Leyser Levin (elected 2)	803	30.4
Philip Gell	641	24.3
Edmund Bond	295	11.2
Total formal votes	2,639	99.2
Informal votes	21	0.8
Turnout	1,705	57.8
	(1 new seat)	

The sitting member George Day successfully contested Albury

=== The Hunter ===
1880 New South Wales colonial election: The Hunter Tuesday 23 November
Candidate	Votes	%
John Burns (re-elected)	644	60.3
John Nowlan	424	39.7
Total formal votes	1,068	97.5
Informal votes	28	2.6
Turnout	1,096	80.2

=== Illawarra ===
1880 New South Wales colonial election: Illawarra Wednesday 24 November
Candidate	Votes	%
Alexander Stuart (re-elected)	unopposed	

=== Inverell ===
1880 New South Wales colonial election: Inverell Monday 29 November
Candidate	Votes	%
Richard Murray (elected)	561	54.3
G R Maclean	472	45.7
Total formal votes	1,033	96.5
Informal votes	37	3.5
Turnout	1,070	60.0
	(new seat)	

=== Kiama ===
1880 New South Wales colonial election: Kiama Saturday 27 November
Candidate	Votes	%
Harman Tarrant (re-elected)	unopposed	

=== The Macleay ===
1880 New South Wales colonial election: The Macleay Tuesday 23 November
Candidate	Votes	%
Robert Smith (re-elected)	unopposed	
	(new seat)	

Robert Smith was the member for the abolished district of The Hastings.

=== Molong ===
1880 New South Wales colonial election: Molong Friday 26 November
Candidate	Votes	%
Andrew Ross (elected)	520	50.3
John Smith	514	49.7
Total formal votes	1,034	97.7
Informal votes	24	2.3
Turnout	1,058	57.0
	(new seat)	

=== Monaro ===
1880 New South Wales colonial election: Monaro Thursday 2 December
Candidate	Votes	%
Henry Badgery (re-elected 1)	899	30.9
Robert Tooth (elected 2)	868	29.8
John Toohey	719	24.7
W T Cohen	426	14.6
Total formal votes	2,912	99.3
Informal votes	21	0.7
Turnout	1,754	67.7
	(1 new seat)	

The sitting member John Murphy did not contest the election. Henry Badgery was the member for East Maitland.

=== Morpeth ===
1880 New South Wales colonial election: Morpeth Thursday 18 November
Candidate	Votes	%
Robert Wisdom (re-elected)	unopposed	

=== Mudgee ===
1880 New South Wales colonial election: Mudgee Wednesday 1 December
Candidate	Votes	%
Samuel Terry (re-elected 1)	1,790	25.0
Louis Beyers (re-elected 2)	1,754	24.5
David Buchanan (re-elected 3)	1,492	20.8
Joseph O'Connor	1,063	14.9
Total formal votes	1,059	100.0
Informal votes	7,158	0.0
Turnout	7,158	53.7
	(2 new seats)	

The sitting member David Buchanan had already unsuccessfully contested West Sydney. Samuel Terry was the member for New England and Louis Beyers was the member for the abolished district of Goldfields West.

=== The Murray ===
1880 New South Wales colonial election: The Murray Thursday 2 December
Candidate	Votes	%
Alexander Wilson (elected 1)	1,058	26.9
William Hay (elected 2)	992	25.2
Edward Killen	951	24.2
Robert Barbour (defeated)	933	23.7
Total formal votes	3,934	98.6
Informal votes	56	1.4
Turnout	2,206	69.1
	(1 new seat)	

=== The Murrumbidgee ===
1880 New South Wales colonial election: The Murrumbidgee Wednesday 1 December
Candidate	Votes	%
James Douglas (elected 1)	1,307	34.9
George Loughnan (elected 2)	1,263	33.7
Auber Jones	1,173	31.3
Total formal votes	3,743	99.2
Informal votes	30	0.8
Turnout	3,773	36.2
	(1 new seat)	

The sitting member Joseph Leary unsuccessfully contested Camden.

=== The Namoi ===
1880 New South Wales colonial election: The Namoi Wednesday 24 November
Candidate	Votes	%
Thomas Dangar (re-elected)	unopposed	
	(new seat)	

Thomas Dangar was the sitting member for The Gwydir.

=== The Nepean ===
1880 New South Wales colonial election: The Nepean Monday 22 November
Candidate	Votes	%
Thomas Smith (re-elected)	unopposed	

=== New England ===
1880 New South Wales colonial election: New England Thursday 2 December
Candidate	Votes	%
William Proctor (elected 1)	962	35.8
Henry Copeland (re-elected 2)	909	33.9
Jeremiah O'Connell	814	30.3
Total formal votes	2,685	99.2
Informal votes	23	0.9
Turnout	1,779	51.9
	(1 new seat)	

The sitting member Samuel Terry successfully contested Mudgee. Henry Copeland was the member for the abolished seat of Goldfields North.

=== Newcastle ===
1880 New South Wales colonial election: Newcastle Monday 22 November
Candidate	Votes	%
James Fletcher (elected 1)	1,876	38.2
George Lloyd (elected 2)	1,195	24.3
James Ellis	1,012	20.6
Richard Bowker (defeated)	830	16.9
Total formal votes	4,913	99.3
Informal votes	34	0.7
Turnout	4,947	73.6
	(1 new seat)	

=== Newtown ===
1880 New South Wales colonial election: Newtown Monday 22 November
Candidate	Votes	%
Stephen Brown (re-elected 1)	1,545	36.3
William Foster (elected 2)	1,281	30.1
John Young	844	19.8
Joseph Mitchell	588	13.8
Total formal votes	4,258	99.0
Informal votes	42	1.0
Turnout	2,171	64.3
	(1 new seat)	

=== Northumberland ===
1880 New South Wales colonial election: Northumberland Friday 26 November
Candidate	Votes	%
Ninian Melville (re-elected 1)	1,978	37.5
William Turner (elected 2)	1,616	30.6
Thomas Hungerford	1,191	22.6
Thomas Dalveen	491	9.3
Total formal votes	5,276	99.6
Informal votes	20	0.4
Turnout	2,906	77.2
	(1 new seat)	

=== Orange ===
1880 New South Wales colonial election: Orange Wednesday 24 November
Candidate	Votes	%
Andrew Kerr (re-elected 1)	964	37.2
William Clarke (elected 2)	818	31.6
Thomas Dalton	811	31.3
Total formal votes	2,593	99.5
Informal votes	13	0.5
Turnout	1,566	63.6
	(1 new seat)	

=== Paddington ===
1880 New South Wales colonial election: Paddington Thursday 18 November
Candidate	Votes	%
William Trickett (elected 1)	1,590	39.8
William Hezlet (re-elected 2)	1,212	30.4
William Allen	688	17.2
J Carroll	502	12.6
Total formal votes	3,992	98.9
Informal votes	46	1.1
Turnout	2,599	64.3
	(1 new seat)	

=== Parramatta ===
1880 New South Wales colonial election: Parramatta Thursday 18 November
Candidate	Votes	%
Charles Byrnes (elected)	601	51.2
Hugh Taylor (defeated)	574	48.9
Total formal votes	1,175	97.1
Informal votes	35	2.9
Turnout	1,210	84.7
	(1 less seat)	

The other siting member William Long did not contest the election.

=== Patrick's Plains ===
1880 New South Wales colonial election: Patrick's Plains Thursday 25 November
Candidate	Votes	%
John Brown (elected)	493	50.3
William Browne (defeated)	487	49.7
Total formal votes	980	97.3
Informal votes	27	2.7
Turnout	1,007	66.2

=== Queanbeyan ===
1880 New South Wales colonial election: Queanbeyan Monday 22 November
Candidate	Votes	%
James Thompson (re-elected)	518	57.6
Percy Hodgkinson	381	42.4
Total formal votes	899	100.0
Informal votes	0	0.0
Turnout	929	54.3

=== Redfern ===
1880 New South Wales colonial election: Redfern Friday 19 November
Candidate	Votes	%
John Sutherland (elected 1)	2,386	40.3
Alfred Fremlin (elected 2)	2,209	37.3
Patrick Stanley	757	12.8
Patrick Hogan	567	9.6
Total formal votes	5,919	99.1
Informal votes	55	0.9
Turnout	3,567	66.0
	(new seat)	

=== The Richmond ===
1880 New South Wales colonial election: The Richmond Wednesday 24 November
Candidate	Votes	%
Charles Fawcett (re-elected)	unopposed	
	(new seat)	

The Richmond was created from the northern part of The Clarence and Charles Fawcett was the member for The Clarence.

=== Shoalhaven ===
1880 New South Wales colonial election: Shoalhaven Tuesday 23 November
Candidate	Votes	%
John Roseby (re-elected)	859	52.8
Frederick Humphery	767	47.2
Total formal votes	1,626	98.3
Informal votes	28	1.7
Turnout	1,654	85.4

=== South Sydney ===
1880 New South Wales colonial election: South Sydney Thursday 18 November
Candidate	Votes	%
John Davies (re-elected 1)	2,707	17.3
George Withers (elected 2)	2,389	15.3
George Carter (elected 3)	2,170	13.9
William Poole (elected 4)	2,158	13.8
Joseph Olliffe	2,125	13.6
Edward Horden	2,115	13.6
John Fitzgerald	1,040	6.7
Alexander Steel	764	4.9
Aaron Wheeler	144	0.9
Total formal votes	15,612	99.2
Informal votes	133	0.8
Turnout	5,648	69.5
	(new seat)	

John Davies was a sitting member for East Sydney.

=== St Leonards ===
1880 New South Wales colonial election: St Leonards Monday 22 November
Candidate	Votes	%
James Farnell (re-elected)	869	55.3
Bernard Holtermann	703	44.7
Total formal votes	1,572	96.8
Informal votes	52	3.2
Turnout	1,624	59.8

=== Tamworth ===
1880 New South Wales colonial election: Tamworth Thursday 2 December
Candidate	Votes	%
Sydney Burdekin (elected 1)	821	29.3
Robert Levien (elected 2)	820	29.3
Michael Burke	610	21.8
Hanley Bennett (defeated)	548	19.6
Total formal votes	2,799	99.1
Informal votes	25	0.9
Turnout	2,824	39.2
	(new seat)	

Hanley Bennett was the member for the abolished district of Liverpool Plains.

=== Tenterfield ===
1880 New South Wales colonial election: Tenterfield Monday 22 November
Candidate	Votes	%
John Dillon (re-elected)	381	70.0
William Christie	163	30.0
Total formal votes	544	96.5
Informal votes	20	3.6
Turnout	564	40.0

=== Tumut ===
1880 New South Wales colonial election: Tumut Saturday 20 November
Candidate	Votes	%
James Hoskins (re-elected)	564	51.0
William Spicer	542	49.0
Total formal votes	1,106	98.8
Informal votes	13	1.2
Turnout	1,119	58.0
	(new seat)	

=== The Upper Hunter ===
1880 New South Wales colonial election: The Upper Hunter Tuesday 30 November
Candidate	Votes	%
John McElhone (re-elected 1)	1,050	37.2
John McLaughlin (elected 2)	979	34.7
William Clendinning	791	28.1
Total formal votes	2,820	99.5
Informal votes	15	0.5
Turnout	2,835	51.1
	(1 new seat)	

=== Wellington ===
1880 New South Wales colonial election: Wellington Monday 29 November
Candidate	Votes	%
Edmund Barton (re-elected)	unopposed	

The sitting member John Shepherd did not contest the election. Edmund Barton was the member for the abolished district of University of Sydney.

=== Wentworth ===
1880 New South Wales colonial election: Wentworth Thursday 2 December
Candidate	Votes	%
William Brodribb (elected)	unopposed	
	(new seat)	

=== West Macquarie ===
1880 New South Wales colonial election: West Macquarie Saturday 27 November
Candidate	Votes	%
Charles Pilcher (re-elected)	461	53.3
Alfred Pechey	404	46.7
Total formal votes	865	97.5
Informal votes	22	2.5
Turnout	882	79.3

=== West Maitland ===
1880 New South Wales colonial election: West Maitland Thursday 25 November
Candidate	Votes	%
James Fulford (elected)	612	58.6
Henry Cohen (defeated)	432	41.4
Total formal votes	1,044	98.1
Informal votes	20	1.9
Turnout	1,064	87.0

=== West Sydney ===
1880 New South Wales colonial election: West Sydney Monday 22 November
Candidate	Votes	%
Angus Cameron (re-elected 1)	3,070	18.5
Daniel O'Connor (re-elected 2)	2,687	16.2
Francis Abigail (elected 3)	2,226	13.4
William Martin (elected 4)	2,206	13.3
John Harris (defeated)	2,033	12.2
Thomas White	1,197	7.2
Charles Roberts	1,109	6.7
David Buchanan	999	6.0
John Harris Snr	571	3.4
William Roylance	511	3.1
Total formal votes	16,609	98.7
Informal votes	216	1.3
Turnout	5,858	66.0

The other sitting member James Merriman did not contest the election. David Buchanan was the sitting member for Mudgee and subsequently regained a seat in that district.

=== Wollombi ===
1880 New South Wales colonial election: Wollombi Wednesday 24 November
Candidate	Votes	%
Joseph Eckford (re-elected)	406	42.3
Joseph Gorrick	328	34.1
Robert Higgins	227	23.6
Total formal votes	961	99.4
Informal votes	6	0.6
Turnout	967	75.1

=== Yass Plains ===
1880 New South Wales colonial election: Yass Plains Tuesday 23 November
Candidate	Votes	%
Michael Fitzpatrick (re-elected)	562	59.6
Henry Dodds	381	40.4
Total formal votes	943	97.7
Informal votes	22	2.3
Turnout	964	51.9

=== Young ===
1880 New South Wales colonial election: Young Monday 22 November
Candidate	Votes	%
James Watson (re-elected 1)	968	30.3
William Watson (elected 2)	841	26.4
John Heaton	726	22.8
Patrick Crowe	656	20.6
Total formal votes	3,191	98.6
Informal votes	44	1.4
Turnout	1,644	53.9
	(new seat)	

== See also ==
- Candidates of the 1880 New South Wales colonial election
- Members of the New South Wales Legislative Assembly, 1880–1882
