= 1887 South Sydney colonial by-election =

By-election in New South Wales, Australia

A by-election was held for the New South Wales Legislative Assembly electorate of South Sydney on 4 June 1887 because Bernhard Wise (Free Trade) was appointed Attorney General in the fourth Parkes ministry. Such ministerial by-elections were usually uncontested. Most of the ministry was not required to face a by-election as they had been appointed prior to the general election in February 1887. William Foster had been the Attorney General however he resigned on the ground that he had been promised an appointment to the Supreme Court and Henry Stephen had been appointed instead.

== Dates ==
Date	Event
18 May 1887	William Foster resigned as Attorney General.
27 May 1887	Bernhard Wise appointed Attorney General.
31 May 1887	Writ of election issued by the Speaker of the Legislative Assembly.
2 June 1887	Nominations
4 June 1887	Polling day
7 June 1887	Return of writ

== Result ==
1887 South Sydney by-election]] Saturday 4 June
Party	Candidate	Votes	%	±%
Free Trade	Bernhard Wise (re-elected)	2,618	50.4	
Protectionist	William Traill	2,578	49.6	
Total formal votes		5,196	99.1	
Informal votes		49	0.9	
Turnout		5,245	53.9	
Free Trade hold				

== Aftermath ==
With a margin of just 40 votes, William Traill challenged the result in the Elections and Qualifications Committee. The Committee consisted of 2 Free Trade members (William Trickett and Charles Garland) and 3 Protectionist members (James Garvan, Thomas Slattery and Henry Clarke). The committee scrutinised the ballot papers and held that Wise was properly elected, finding that the true result was Wise 2,611, Traill 2,571, formal 5,182, informal 62, total 5,244.

== See also ==
- Electoral results for the district of South Sydney
- List of New South Wales state by-elections
