= 1893 South Sydney colonial by-election =

By-election in New South Wales, Australia

A by-election was held for the New South Wales Legislative Assembly electorate of South Sydney on 13 February 1893 because of the resignation of James Toohey (Protectionist), in protest at the failure of the Protectionist Dibbs government to implement principles of protection.

== Dates ==
Date	Event
31 January 1893	James Toohey resigned.
1 February 1893	Writ of election issued by the Speaker of the Legislative Assembly.
10 February 1893	Nominations.
13 February 1893	Polling day
20 February 1893	Return of writ

== Result ==
1893 South Sydney by-election Monday 13 February
Party	Candidate	Votes	%	±%
Protectionist	William Manning (elected)	1,985	41.7	
Free Trade	Edward Foxall	1,962	41.2	
Labour	Frederick Flowers	814	17.1	
Total formal votes		4,761	98.7	
Informal votes		64	1.3	
Turnout		4,825	48.9 (Note: estimate based on an electoral roll of 9,862 at the 1891 election.)	
Protectionist hold				

== See also ==
- Electoral results for the district of South Sydney
- List of New South Wales state by-elections
