= William Patrick Manning =

Australian financier and politician

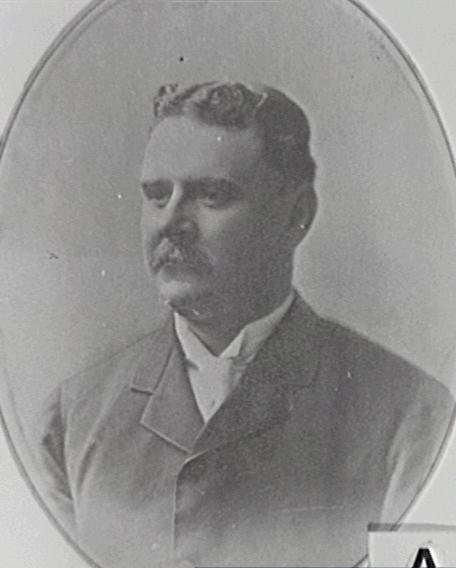
- Born: 18 November 1845; Darlinghurst, New South Wales
- Died: 20 April 1915 (aged 69); Rose Bay, New South Wales
- Occupation(s): Financier, politician
- Spouse: Honorah Torpy (m. 1868)

Sir William Patrick Manning (18 November 1845 – 20 April 1915) was an Australian financier and politician.

== Early life ==
Manning was born at Darlinghurst, New South Wales, to baker John Manning and Margaret née Hourigan (Note: His parliamentary biography gives Mary's maiden name as Harrocks.) On 8 August 1868 he married Honorah Torpy in Sydney, with whom he had three daughters and five sons.

== Business interests ==
He commenced working for an engineering firm, becoming chief accountant. The firm closed in the mid 1870s and he set up his own business as a public accountant and broker. He worked as a financier and had extensive business interests, including a director of the Sun Insurance Office from 1894, a director of the Citizens' Life Assurance Co from 1896 and chairman of the Australian Joint Stock Bank from 1911.

== Civic and political career ==
On 1 December 1887 he was elected an alderman for the Bourke Ward on the Sydney Municipal Council with a large majority, defeating John Young. He would serve on the council until 6 December 1900. In April 1891 Sydney Burdekin resigned as Mayor of Sydney to travel to Europe and Manning was unanimously elected to replace him. He served as Mayor until December 1894. During his time on council, he was a member of the Finance Committee, 1899–1900, the Electric Lighting Committee, 1895–1900 and the Disposal of Refuse Committee, 1895–98. He oversaw the remodelling of the Belmore Markets and played a major role in the construction of the Queen Victoria Market Building. He chaired the 1891 Royal Commission into Alleged Chinese Gambling and Immorality, and was also commissioner on three other occasions. He was noted for his management of the council during the financial crisis in 1893 and for assisting Premier Sir George Dibbs in drafting the Bank Issue Act of 1893.

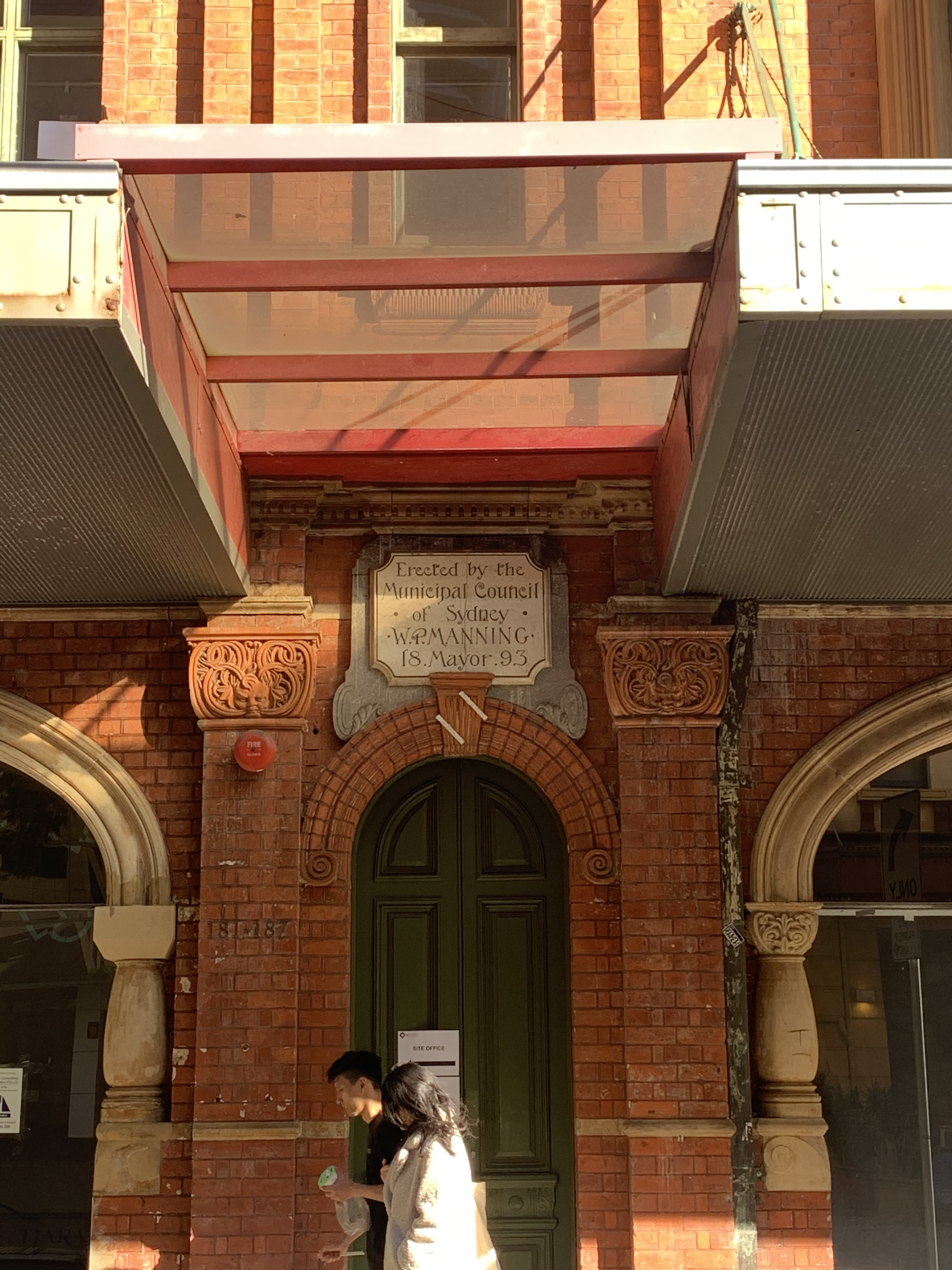
Plaque showing "WP Manning, Mayor, 1893" on building, Hay Street, Haymarket Sydney

He was a Protectionist candidate for the New South Wales Legislative Assembly, district of East Sydney at the 1891 election, however he finished 5th with a margin of 705 votes (3.5%). He was successful at the 1893 by-election, winning with a margin of 23 votes (0.5%). Multi-member districts were abolished in 1894 and South Sydney was divided into 4 new districts, including Sydney-Phillip. Manning stood as the Protectionist candidate for Sydney-Phillip, however he was defeated at the 1894 election by 117 votes (7.7%). He was a strong advocate for Federation in his campaign for Woollahra at the 1898 election, however this did not result in electoral success, defeated by 174 votes (12.5%). He did not hold ministerial or party office.

== Death ==
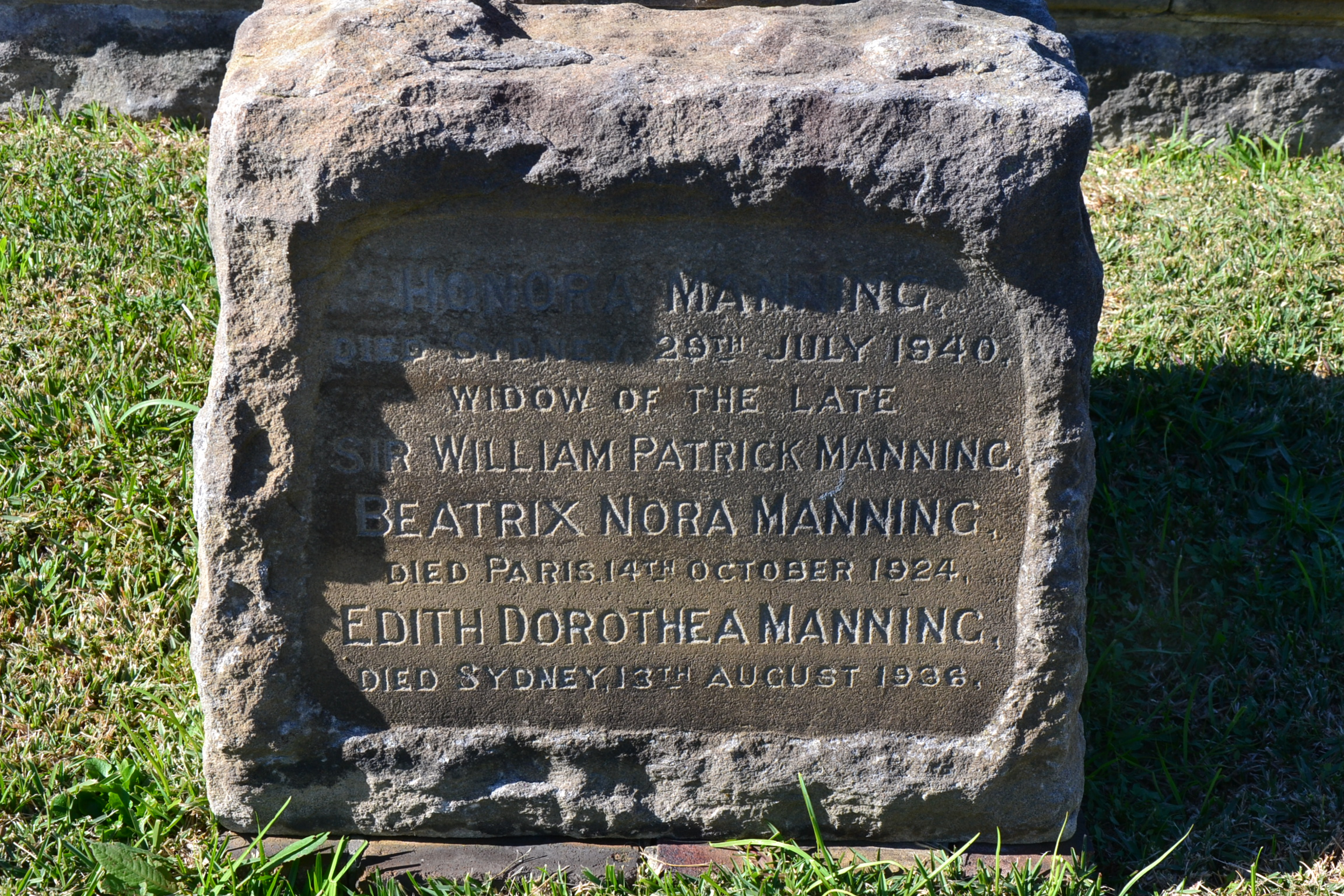
Grave of Manning's wife Honora, South Head Cemetery, Sydney

Manning died at Rose Bay on 20 April 1915 (aged 69). He was survived by his wife and eight children. The second son, Sir Henry, was a barrister and politician, while the fourth son, Frederic, was a writer.

== Honours ==
Manning was knighted on 15 February 1894, by reference to his service as Mayor of Sydney.

== Notes ==
Civic offices
Preceded by Sydney Burdekin	Mayor of Sydney; 1891 – 1894	Succeeded by Samuel Lees
New South Wales Legislative Assembly
Preceded by James Toohey	Member for South Sydney; 1893 – 1894; With: Martin, Traill, Wise	District abolished
