= John Toohey (politician) =

Irish-born Australian brewer and politician

John Thomas Toohey (26 April 1839 – 5 May 1903) was an Irish-born Australian brewer and politician.

He was born in Moneygall, County Tipperary to businessman Matthew Toohey and Honora Hall. His family migrated to Melbourne in 1841. He was educated at St Patrick's College, East Melbourne. His father was involved in unsuccessful business dealings that eventually forced them to move to New South Wales in 1866. Toohey settled near Lismore, and around 1869 established a cordial factory. The following year he and his brother James began brewing at the Metropolitan Brewery; this would eventually lead to Tooheys Brewery, which the brothers ran. On 26 August 1871 Toohey married Sarah Doheny, with whom he had five children; he would later marry Annie Mary Murphy Egan, a widow, in New Zealand. In 1892 he was appointed to the New South Wales Legislative Council, where he was known as a supporter of Irish nationalism and as a prominent Catholic. In 1902 he embarked on a world tour, but he died in Chicago the following year.
