= James Toohey (New South Wales politician) =

Australian politician

James Matthew Toohey
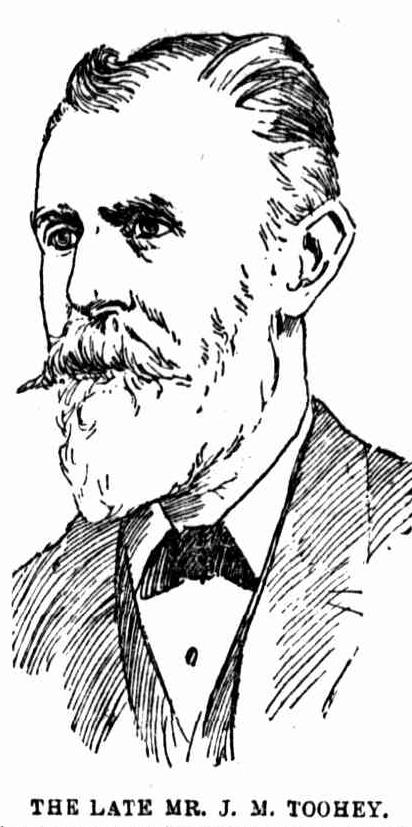
- Born: 18 March 1850; Melbourne, Victoria, Australia
- Died: 25 September 1895 (aged 45); Pisa, Italy
- Burial place: Rookwood Cemetery
- Occupation: Politician
- Spouse: Catherine Magdalene Ferris

Member of the New South Wales Parliament for South Sydney
- In office 1885–1893

James Matthew Toohey (18 March 1850 – 25 September 1895) was a brewer and politician in the Colony of New South Wales.

== Early life ==
He was born in Melbourne to businessman Matthew Toohey and Honora Hall, his middle name referring to Father Mathew, the Irish apostle of temperance. He was educated at St Patrick's College, East Melbourne.

On 5 June 1873 he married Catherine Magdalene Ferris, with whom he had twelve children.

== Brewing ==
In 1870, aged 20, he opened a brewing business with his brother John. The brewery was successful, moving to larger premises in 1873 and again in 1876, and would eventually become the public company Tooheys.

== Politics ==
He stood as a candidate for the New South Wales Legislative Assembly for district of South Sydney at the 1885 election. On the major issues of the election, he noted that it scarcely needed to be said that he was opposed to the local option, put forward by the teetotallers to reduce the consumption of alcohol, stating that "people will not be made total abstainers by Act of Parliament". He praised the despatch of the New South Wales Contingent to the Sudan, describing it as "a huge advertisement for the colony", and that tariffs needed to be altered so as to protect local manufacturers. He has no position on the Land Bill, describing it as "a thing no fellow can understand". He was elected second with 16.1% of the vote, holding it until he resigned in 1893. Toohey said that his resignation was in protest at the failure of the Protectionist Dibbs government to implement principles of protection. He did not hold ministerial or other parliamentary position. Such was his antipathy for Dibbs he ran against him as an independent protectionist candidate for Tamworth at the 1894 election, however Toohey polled poorly with just 35 votes (2.5%) and Dibbs won the seat.

== Death ==
Toohey went on a trip to Ireland, England and Europe, however he died at Pisa in Italy on 25 September 1895 (aged 45). His body was returned to Sydney for a funeral at St Mary's Cathedral, and he was buried in Rookwood Cemetery. He was succeeded in the brewing business by his eldest son, John Thomas.

New South Wales Legislative Assembly
| Preceded by John Harris; William Poole; George Withers | Member for South Sydney; 1885–1893; Served alongside: Davies/Withers/Edmunds/Wise; Forsyth/Riley/Martin; Olliffe/Wise/Traill | Succeeded by William Manning |
