= Alban Riley =

Australian politician

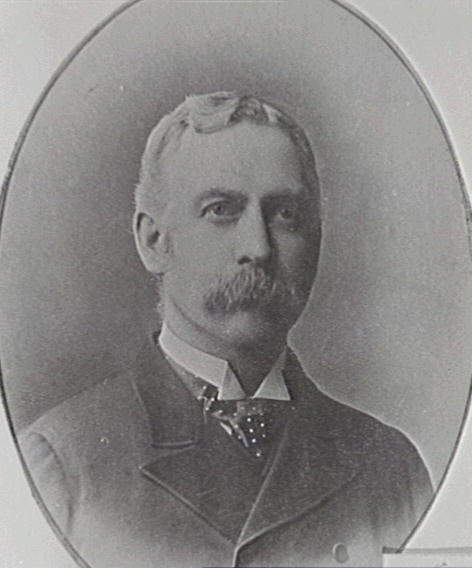
Alderman Alban Joseph Riley J.P. (1885–1891) Mayor 1887

Alban Joseph Riley (8 June 1844 – 24 July 1914) was an Australian politician. He was mayor of the City of Sydney and a Member of the New South Wales Legislative Assembly.

== Early life ==
Riley was born at Balmain to softgoods merchant Alban Joseph Riley and Juliana Lyons. He was educated privately at Maitland, and in 1859 was apprenticed to a draper. He established his own branches around 1868 at Bathurst and in 1874 at Maitland. On 4 October 1870 he married Eleanor Harriett Birkenhead, the second daughter of William and Hannah Birkenhead, at Sydney.

In 1878 Riley visited India, Palestine, Europe and England. He established an export drapery business, AJ Riley & Co, with branches in London, Paris and Sydney. His private residence was Tulloona, in Gloucester Avenue, Burwood.

== Politics ==
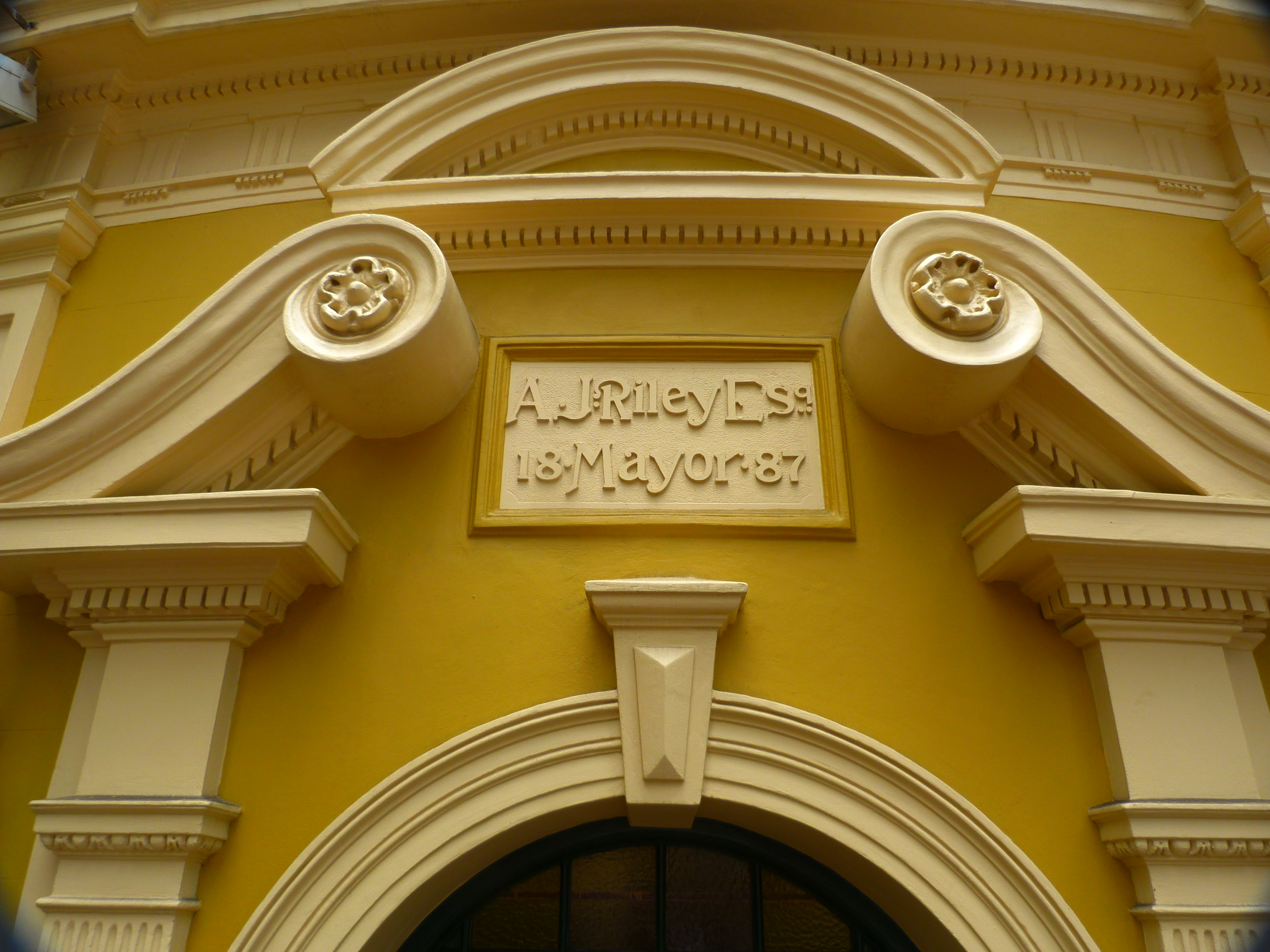
Riley's name over the entrance to the Sydney Corn Exchange building

Riley was a Burwood alderman in 1884. He served on Sydney City Council from 1885 to 1891 and was mayor in 1887. He first stood for the New South Wales Legislative Assembly at the 1885 election for Canterbury, but was unsuccessful by a margin of 133 votes (0.8%). In 1887 he was elected to the Legislative Assembly as a Free Trade member for South Sydney, finishing at the head of the poll, but was defeated in 1889 with a swing to the Protectionists. Appointed to the New South Wales Legislative Council in 1891, he was forced to resign in 1893 when he was declared bankrupt. He was alleged to have continued trading and obtaining credit despite his bankruptcy.

== Later life ==
Riley died at his home Tulloona, Park Road, Burwood on 24 July 1914 (aged 70), survived by Eleanor, five sons and five daughters. He was buried in Rookwood Cemetery on 26 July 1914.

== Legacy ==
The Corn Exchange built in 1887 has his name and that he was mayor in 1887 over the corner door.

New South Wales Legislative Assembly
Preceded by John Davies; Archibald Forsyth; Joseph Olliffe; James Toohey	Member for South Sydney; 1887–1889; With: Bernhard Wise; George Withers; James Toohey	Succeeded by Walter Edmunds; James Martin; William Traill; James Toohey
Civic offices
Preceded by John Young	Mayor of Sydney; 1887	Succeeded by John Harris
