= Sydney Burdekin =

Australian politician (1839–1899)

Sydney Burdekin JP
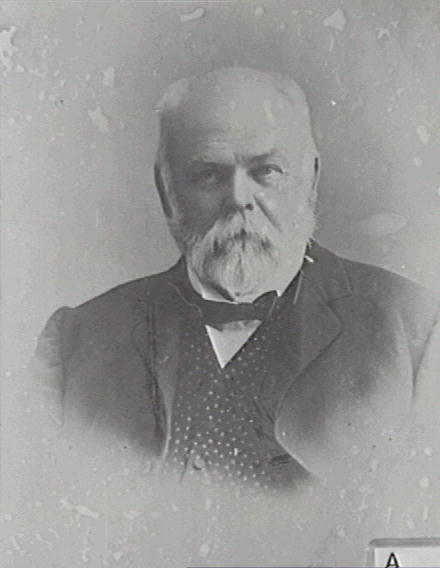

36th Mayor of Sydney
- In office 1 January 1890 – 31 December 1891
- Preceded by: John Harris
- Succeeded by: William Patrick Manning

Alderman of the Sydney City Council
- In office 1 December 1883 – 20 November 1898
- Succeeded by: William Dymock
- Constituency: Macquarie Ward

Personal details
- Born: 18 March 1839 Sydney, Colony of New South Wales
- Died: 17 December 1899 (aged 60) Rooty Hill, Colony of New South Wales
- Party: Free Trade Party
- Relatives: Marshall Burdekin (Brother); Alexander Hay (Son-in-law)

Sydney Burdekin (18 February 1839 – 17 December 1899) was an Australian politician.

He was born in Sydney to merchant Thomas Burdekin and Mary Ann Bossley. He was educated at Darlinghurst and graduated from the University of Sydney in 1859 with a Bachelor of Arts. He became a solicitor's clerk, but apparently did not become a solicitor, instead becoming a pastoralist in northern New South Wales and Queensland. On 24 January 1872 he married Catherine Byrne, with whom he had eight children.

He was elected to the New South Wales Legislative Assembly as the member for Tamworth at the 1880 election, but he was defeated at the 1882 election contesting South Sydney. Having moved to Sydney, he was elected to Sydney City Council in 1883; he would serve on that council until 1898. In 1884 he was returned to the Assembly via the by-election for East Sydney. He was Mayor of Sydney from 1890 to 1891, when he retired from the Assembly; however, he won the 1892 by-election for Hawkesbury, but was defeated again in 1894. A Free Trader, he also served as director of Sydney Hospital from 1878 to 1899.

Burdekin died at Rooty Hill in 1899. His brother, Marshall Burdekin, was also a member of the Legislative Assembly.

New South Wales Legislative Assembly
New seat	Member for Tamworth; 1880–1882; Served alongside: Robert Levien	Succeeded by John Gill
Preceded by George Reid	Member for East Sydney; 1884–1891; Served alongside: Barton/Street/Bradley, Copeland/McMillan, Griffiths/Reid	Succeeded by Edmund Barton; Varney Parkes
Preceded by Alexander Bowman	Member for Hawkesbury; 1892–1894	Succeeded by William Morgan
Civic offices
Preceded by John Harris	Mayor of Sydney; 1890–1891	Succeeded by William Patrick Manning
Non-profit organization positions
Preceded by Sir John Robertson	President of the Royal Agricultural Society of New South Wales; 1890–1891	Succeeded by John See
