= George Griffiths (Australian politician) =

Australian politician (1840–1905)

George Neville Griffiths (23 January 1840 – 28 April 1905) was a New South Wales colonial politician.

He was born in Sydney to banker George Richard Griffiths and Letitita Chatfield. Educated in England, he graduated from Cambridge University with a Bachelor of Arts in 1861, soon returning to Australia. After a period in Queensland, he returned to Sydney and purchased property throughout both colonies, also founding a stock agents' firm. On 3 March 1874 he married Ada Frances Scott, the daughter of John Scott M.L.A. and M.L.C., with whom he had eight children.

He was elected to the New South Wales Legislative Assembly for East Sydney in 1882, but he was defeated in 1885.

Griffiths died in Darlinghurst in 1905. He and his wife Ada Frances are buried in Waverley Cemetery.

Griffiths and Ada Scott had four sons and four daughters:

- Frederick Guy, b. 18 July 1876 and d. 6 June 1952
- John Neville, b. 9 September 1881 and killed in action in France 30 November 1917
- Hugh, b. 18 November 1885 and killed in action at Gallipoli 6 August 1915
- Francis, b. 10 March 1890
- Agnes Laetitia, b. 21 March 1875
- Ada Violet, b. 9 February 1878
- Noel Eve, b. 24 December 1879
- Florence Denise, b. 15 August 1883, married 29 October 1906 William Charles Wentworth III, and were the parents of William Charles Wentworth IV M.P.

== See also ==
- Australian political families § Wentworth/Hill/Griffiths/Scott/Cooper family

New South Wales Legislative Assembly
Preceded by Henry Dangar; Sir Henry Parkes; Arthur Renwick	Member for East Sydney; 1882–1885; Served alongside: Barton, McElhone/Copeland, Reid/Burdekin	Succeeded by George Reid
