= James Martin (New South Wales politician, born 1850) =

Australian politician

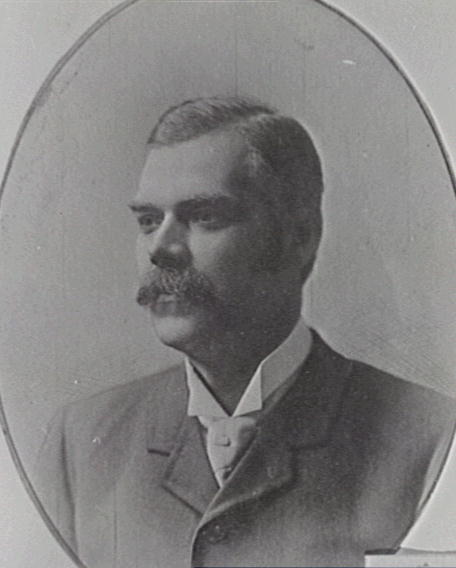
Alderman James Martin [1888-1891 A-00041347. City of Sydney Archives

James Martin (1850 – 30 April 1898) was a politician in the British colony of New South Wales..

He was born in Sydney to contractor Francis Martin and Hannah Allan. He attended William Street and Fort Street public schools and then Sydney Grammar School, becoming a businessman dealing in hardware and machinery. In 1872 he married Elizabeth Bates, with whom he had four children. In 1889 he was elected to the New South Wales Legislative Assembly as the Free Trade member for South Sydney. He transferred to Sydney-Bligh in 1894 but was defeated in 1895. He also served as an alderman of the City of Sydney where he represented Denison Ward, from 1 December 1888 to 30 November 1891. Martin died at Burwood in 1898.

New South Wales Legislative Assembly
Preceded by Alban Riley; Bernhard Wise; George Withers	Member for South Sydney; 1889–1894; Served alongside: Edmunds/Wise, Toohey, Traill	Abolished
New seat	Member for Sydney-Bligh; 1894–1895	Succeeded by James Harvey
