= William Henry Traill =

Australian journalist and politician

W. H. Traill
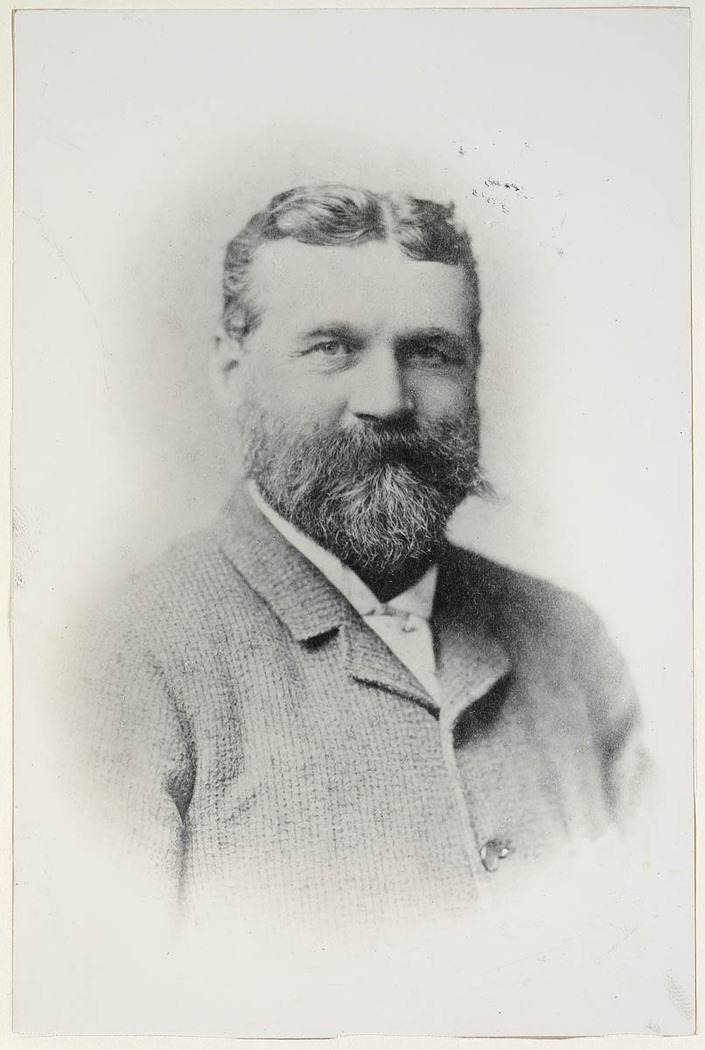
- Traill c. 1892

Member of the New South Wales Parliament for South Sydney
- In office 19 January 1889 – 25 June 1894 Serving with James Toohey, William Manning, Walter Edmunds, Bernhard Wise, James Martin
- Preceded by: Bernhard Wise
- Succeeded by: Abolished

Personal details
- Born: 7 May 1842 London, England
- Died: 21 May 1901 (aged 59) Brisbane, Queensland, Australia
- Party: Protectionist Party
- Spouses: Jessie Lewis (m. 1866; died 1867) Agnes Lewis (m. 1871)
- Occupation: Public servant, journalist, newspaper editor

William Henry Traill (7 May 1842 – 21 May 1902) was an Australian journalist and politician, commonly referred to as W. H. Traill. He was an early editor and for a period the principal proprietor of The Bulletin in Sydney.

== Early life ==
Traill, only son of John Traill of Westove, Orkney Islands, and his wife Eliza Dunbar (née Heddle) (Note: The names Traill and Heddle crop up together across strands not closely related to this family. For instance, the painter Jessie C. A. Traill held an exhibition opened by her cousin Captain E. Moodie-Heddle in 1948.) was born in London. The Westove Estate had been held by Traill descendants for more than 300 years.

== Journalism ==
Traill started his career with a regular column headed Passing Thoughts to the Express, while a special commissioner investigating the land dummying being carried on in connection with the opening up of the Darling Downs. In 1871 he married Agnes Lewis, the sister of his first wife. He returned to the Courier's literary staff in late 1873 when Gresley Lukin became part proprietor and managing editor. Traill served as editor of The Queenslander from late 1873 until late 1878 when he moved with his family to Sydney to take up the editorship of The Sydney Mail. He continued to contribute to The Sydney Mail, Echo and The Sydney Morning Herald.

== Parliamentary career ==
Traill elected a member of the Legislative Assembly for South Sydney in 1889. He was committed to protectionism, but otherwise was an independent and was not offered a ministry. He held a position as chairman of the commission to enquire into the working of the New South Wales Lands Office. He was defeated in 1895 and afterwards was engaged unsuccessfully in pastoral and mining pursuits in New South Wales and Queensland and declared bankrupt in 1896.

He wrote for the historical and mining portion of the Queensland Year Book 1902. He died of heart disease at his residence at Yeerongpilly in Brisbane in 1902 at the age of 58. He married twice; at the time of his death he had four sons and three daughters.

== Personal ==
On 23 April 1866 Traill married singer Jessie Lewis (20 December 1846 – 19 February 1869), daughter of James (31 March 1816 – 11 June 1862) and Mary Ann Lewis (21 March 1819 – 23 August 1894 at "Cliffside", Watsons Bay, NSW), of Escrick, near York, England. She died of consumption at her home, Armagh cottage, Kangaroo Point, Queensland. They had one daughter. The journalist Pattie Lewis, aka Mrs James Fotheringhame ("Mab" of the Bulletin), was Jessie’s sister.

- Amelia "Millie" Heddle Traill (10 March 1867 – 3 August 1957), a musician, she married Forster Heddle in London on 7 November 1899 and moved to Canada in 1941.

Traill married again, to his wife's sister, Agnes Lewis (February 1851 – 17 May 1930) on 11 March 1871. They had nine children, including

- Thomas Traill Fotheringham Westove Traill, usually T. T. F. Traill (29 October 1871 – 14 March 1939) married Margaret Province of "Wonbah station" on 29 December 1902. He was a grazier of "Cynthia station" and "Culcraigie", Eidsvold.
- Brenda Traill (4 August 1872 – 10 October 1877).
- James Lewis "Jim" Traill (24 March 1874 – 20 June 1909) part-owner of Traill Bros, process engravers,
- William Henry Traill (22 February 1877 – 12 December 1879).
- Walter Harold Traill (13 November 1879 – 1 April 1939) partner in Traill Bros., process engravers.
- John Alexander Traill (19 November 1879 – 11 December 1880).
- Gillian Marion Westove Traill (7 October 1881 – 9 April 1965) married Brisbane journalist William Evan Dick (16 May 1878 – 2 December 1939) in Brisbane on 12 January 1907. William was the son of journalist William Heddle Dick (27 February 1850 – 21 July 1893), author of The Mountain of Gold: origin, history, geological features etc of the famous Mount Morgan gold mine (Brisbane, 1889). Their daughter, Brenda Marion, married journalist Angus Brammall, son of Tasmanian writer and poet Bertha Southey Brammall.
- Randolph Charles Magnus Westove "Rolph" Traill (12 January 1885 – 24 February 1950) married Gladys Mildred Frances Ellis on 18 March 1907; they had a son named William Henry Traill on 4 October 1910. Rolph was acting caretaker of Hamilton Island when he died of an accidental gunshot wound.
- Pattie Ernestine Orana Traill (18 March 1888 – 11 December 1978) married electrician, Thomas Heddle Dick (died 14 October 1949), brother of William Evan Dick above, who married Pattie's sister, Gillian.

== Works ==
- A Queenly Colony: Pen Sketches and Camera Glimpses (Brisbane, 1901), 142 pages
- A Plain Explanation of the New Land Act of 1876, and Regulations: Specially Designed for the Information and Guidance of Selectors in Every Part of the Colony (Toowoomba, 1877), 33 pages
- Historical Sketch of Queensland (Sydney, 1980), 111 pages, facsimile; originally published as a section of 'Picturesque atlas of Australasia' edited by Andrew Garran (Sydney 1886)

== Notes ==
New South Wales Legislative Assembly
| Preceded by Alban Riley; Bernhard Wise; George Withers | Member for South Sydney; 1889–1894; Served alongside: Edmunds/Wise, Martin, Toohey/Manning | Abolished |
