= George Carter (New South Wales politician) =

Australian politician

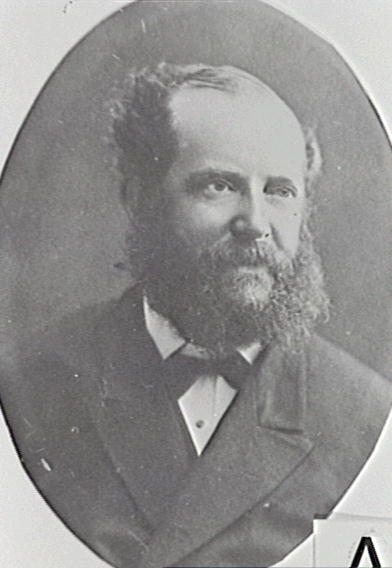
George Carter (1884)

George Lord Carter (1841 – 18 October 1891) was an Australian politician.

He was born in Sydney to dealer Robert Thomas Carter and Elizabeth Maria Bonn. He was a tailor and mercer who worked from George Street. On 26 March 1863 he married Mary Ann McCoy, with whom he had nine children. He served on Sydney City Council from 1878 to 1884. On 1 November 1880 his candidacy for the seat of South Sydney in the New South Wales Legislative Assembly was confirmed and at the election on 18 November 1880 he was elected. He was, however, defeated in 1882. Carter died in Sydney in 1891.

In a pre-election speech on 4 November 1880, he expressed himself as a free-trader, but in favour of initial state-support for industries, as being against Chinese immigration to the colony, and for the speedy extension of the railways. On 29 November 1882, he argued his case for re-election to the seat of South Sydney, in a meeting at the Victoria Park Hotel, stating that he had honoured his pledges.

New South Wales Legislative Assembly
| New seat | Member for South Sydney; 1880–1882; Served alongside: John Davies, William Poole, George Withers | Succeeded by John Harris; Joseph Olliffe |
