= Archibald Forsyth =

Australian politician (1826–1908)

Archibald Forsyth (10 March 1826 – 15 March 1908) was a Scottish-born Australian politician.

He was born at Garmouth in Morayshire to carpenter John Forsyth and Helen Young. He worked on the railways and in the timber trade before migrating to New South Wales in 1848. He logged cedar on the Northern Rivers before following the gold rush across New South Wales and Victoria. He was married three times: firstly on 21 January 1854 to Sarah Corbett, with whom he had nine children; secondly on 24 October 1877 to Sarah Spottiswood Emmett née Blackham (widow of Edward Nucella Emmett); and thirdly around 1906 to Harriet Grace Walker.

A general merchant from 1862 to 1864, he established a rope factory in Sydney in 1865. He was the first president of the Chamber of Manufacturers in 1885, lead the Protection Union in 1886, and helped found the Animal Protection Society in 1873. In 1885 he was elected to the New South Wales Legislative Assembly for South Sydney, but he was defeated in 1887. Forsyth died at Randwick in 1908.

New South Wales Legislative Assembly
| Preceded by John Harris; William Poole; George Withers | Member for South Sydney; 1885–1887; Served alongside: John Davies, Joseph Olliffe, James Toohey | Succeeded by Alban Riley; Bernhard Wise; George Withers |
