= John Meagher (Australian politician) =

Irish-born Australian politician (1837–1920)

Caricature by DavidLow

John Meagher (8 December 1837 – 26 August 1920) was an Irish-born Australian politician.

He was born in Kilrush in County Clare to farmer Roger Meagher and Catherine Mahoney. He migrated to New South Wales around 1859 and worked in a general store at Bathurst, eventually opening his own store in 1867. He also owned stores at Hill End, Trunkey and Carcoar. On 19 September 1864, he married Mary Ann Byrne, with whom he had eight children. In 1881, he went to the gold rush at Temora. He was involved in the campaign for Federation and also supported Irish home rule. In 1900, he was appointed to the New South Wales Legislative Council; a Protectionist, he had known Labor sympathies. He remained in the council until his death in Sydney in 1920.
