= John Davies (New South Wales politician) =

Australian politician (1839–1896)

John Davies CMG (2 March 1839 – 23 May 1896), was a member of the Parliament of New South Wales.

Davies was born in Sydney, the son of John Davies, of New South Wales. In 1861 he married Miss Elisabeth Eaton.

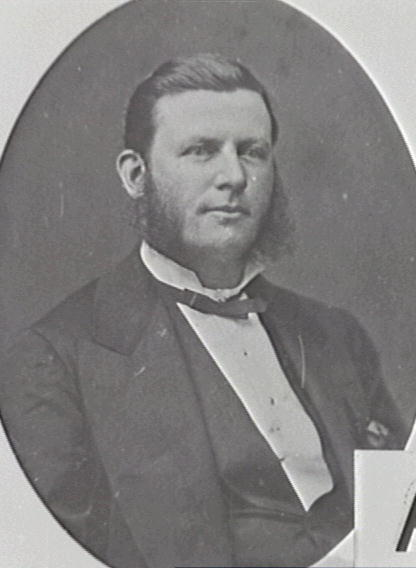
Alderman John Davies, C.M.G., M.L.A., J.P. (1874-82)

Starting in business as an ironmonger and general blacksmith, he commenced to take an active part in politics on the Liberal side as soon as he was of age. On 1 December 1874 he was elected an alderman for the City of Sydney, serving as an alderman until 1882. He was elected to the Legislative Assembly as one of four members for East Sydney at the election on 9 December 1874, representing this seat until 1880. He was Postmaster-General in the Robertson Government from August to December 1877. Davies was acting British Commissioner at the Sydney International Exhibition in 1879, and was made a Companion of the Order of St Michael and St George in the following year, when he was a Commissioner for New South Wales to the Melbourne International Exhibition; as also for the Amsterdam Exhibition in 1883, and the Colonial and Indian Exhibition in 1886. He was President of the Royal Commission on Friendly Societies.

In 1880 Davies switched to the new district of South Sydney, In 1882 he was defeated for South Sydney, and then a week later was unsuccessful at Kiama. He was returned as a member for South Sydney in 1885, but was defeated again in 1887. He was not well educated and acquired the nickname "Jannery", on account of his inability to correctly spell January, under cross examination by Frederick Darley QC, during his slander case against John Harris.

Davies was appointed to the Legislative Council in December 1887, taking his seat in February 1888 and serving until his death on 23 May 1896 (aged 57).

Parliament of New South Wales
Political offices
Preceded by Saul Samuel	Postmaster-General; Aug – Dec 1877	Succeeded by John Burns
New South Wales Legislative Assembly
Preceded by John Macintosh; Henry Parkes; Charles Moore; George Oakes	Member for East Sydney; 1874 – 1880; With: John Macintosh; Henry Parkes/James Greenwood; Alexander Stuart/Arthur Renwick	Succeeded by Henry Dangar; Henry Parkes; George Reid; Arthur Renwick
New district	Member for South Sydney; 1880 – 1882; With: George Carter; William Poole; George Withers	Succeeded by John Harris; Joseph Olliffe; William Poole; George Withers
Preceded by John Harris; Joseph Olliffe; William Poole; George Withers	Member for South Sydney; 1885 – 1887; With: Archibald Forsyth; Joseph Olliffe; James Toohey	Succeeded by Alban Riley; Bernhard Wise; George Withers; James Toohey
