= Walter Edmunds =

Australian politician

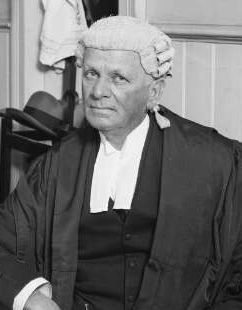
Judge Walter Edmunds during the Royal Commission into AB Piddington Sydney 1927

Walter Edmunds (6 January 1856 – 15 August 1932) was an Australian judge and politician.

== Biography ==
Walter Edmunds was born at Maitland to saddler John Edmunds and Rosina Smith. He attended Lyndhurst College and Fort Street Training School before becoming a teacher at Wollongong. He moved back to Sydney to study at the University of Sydney, gaining a Master of Arts in 1879 and a Bachelor of Law in 1881. He was called to the bar in 1882. In 1889 he was elected to the New South Wales Legislative Assembly as a Protectionist member for South Sydney, serving a single term. On 9 February 1897 he married Monica Victoria May McGrath, with whom he had six children. In 1911 he became a judge on the District Court, and in 1914 was appointed a judge of the Court of Industrial Arbitration. In 1920 he was briefly president of the Board of Trade, and from 1920 to 1926 was senior judge on the Industrial Court. In 1927 he was appointed to conduct a Royal Commission into allegations concerning the Industrial Commissioner, Albert Piddington, along with Judge Walter Bevan and Edward Loxton KC.

Edmunds died at Strathfield in 1932.

New South Wales Legislative Assembly
Preceded by Alban Riley; Bernhard Wise; George Withers; James Toohey	Member for South Sydney; 1889–1891; With: James Martin; James Toohey; William Traill	Succeeded by James Martin; James Toohey; William Traill; Bernhard Wise
