= 1885 New South Wales colonial election =

Colonial election for New South Wales, Australia in 1885

- 16 October 1885 – 31 October 1885

All 122 seats in the New South Wales Legislative Assembly 62 Assembly seats were needed for a majority
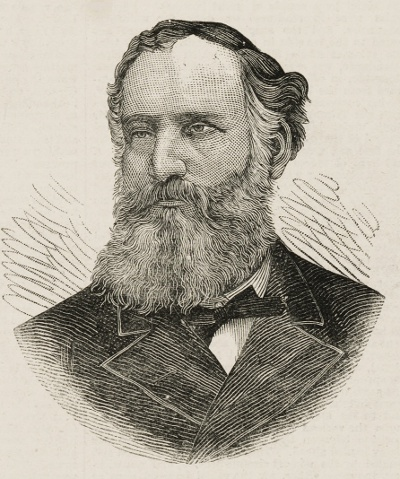

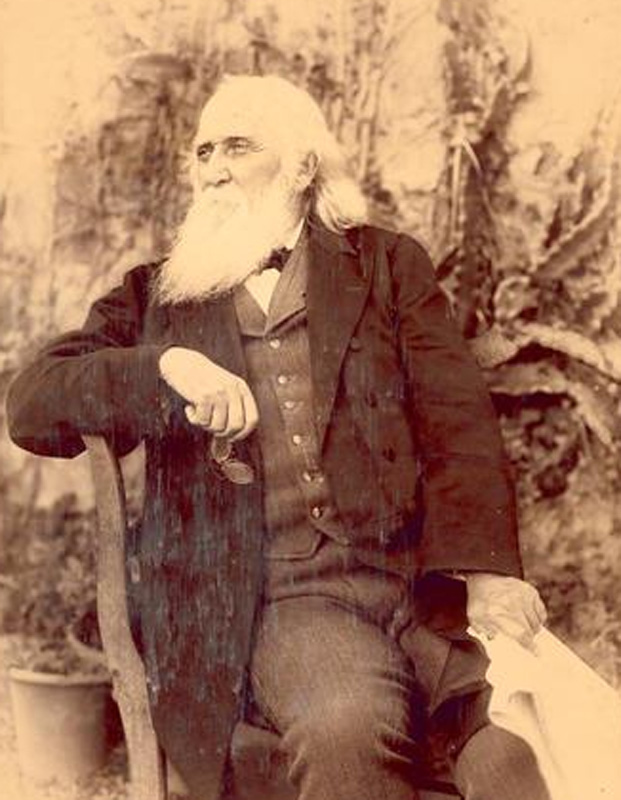
	First party	Second party
Leader	George Dibbs	Sir John Robertson
Party	Government	Opposition
Leader's seat	St Leonards	Mudgee
Seats won	9 Ministers; 58 Supporters^{[a]}	11 Oppositionists; 56 Against Government^{[a]}
- Results of the election, showing winners in each seat. Seats without circles indicate the electorate returned one member. Members are categorised by their vote in a vote of no confidence which took place on 8 December 1885.
Premier before election
George Dibbs
Elected Premier
George Dibbs

The 1885 New South Wales colonial election was held between 16 October and 31 October 1885. This election was for all of the 122 seats in the New South Wales Legislative Assembly and it was conducted in 37 single-member constituencies, 24 2-member constituencies, seven 3-member constituencies and four 4-member constituencies, all with a first past the post system. Suffrage was limited to adult male British subjects, resident in New South Wales. The previous parliament of New South Wales was dissolved on 7 October 1885 by the Governor, Lord Augustus Loftus, on the advice of the Premier, George Dibbs.

There was no recognisable party structure at this election. Instead the government was determined by a loose, shifting factional system. It became the last election to be organised in such a fashion with the rise of the nascent political parties known as the Protectionist Party and the Free Trade Party that were founded in time to contest the 1887 election, and eventually merged in 1909 to become the first of the parties in the lineage of the modern Liberal Party of Australia.

Dibbs had succeeded Alexander Stuart two weeks before the election was held, and maintained a fragile grip on power after the election until 22 December, when he was defeated by Sir John Robertson.

== Key dates ==
Date	Event
7 October 1885	The Legislative Assembly was dissolved, and writs were issued by the Governor to proceed with an election.
13 October to 24 October 1885	Nominations for candidates for the election closed.
16 October to 31 October 1885	Polling days.
17 November 1885	Opening of new Parliament.

== Results ==
New South Wales colonial election, 16 – 31 October 1885 Legislative Assembly << 1882–1887 >>
Enrolled voters	232,390				
Votes cast	129,888		Turnout	61.10	+4.41
Informal votes	2,669		Informal	2.01	−0.09
Summary of votes by party
Party	Primary votes	%	Swing	Seats	Change
Total	23,899			122	

== Notes ==
^{a} There was no discernable party structure in New South Wales at the time. Instead, this numbers are gathered from the ministerial and opposition benches at the start of Parliament, as well as the results of an 8 December 1885 attempted Vote of no confidence against Premier Dibbs. All candidates stood and were elected as independents and their classification here into groups is intended only to give an easier assessment of the political situation in the colony.

== See also ==
- Members of the New South Wales Legislative Assembly, 1885–1887
- Candidates of the 1885 New South Wales colonial election
