= John Harris (New South Wales politician) =

Australian politician

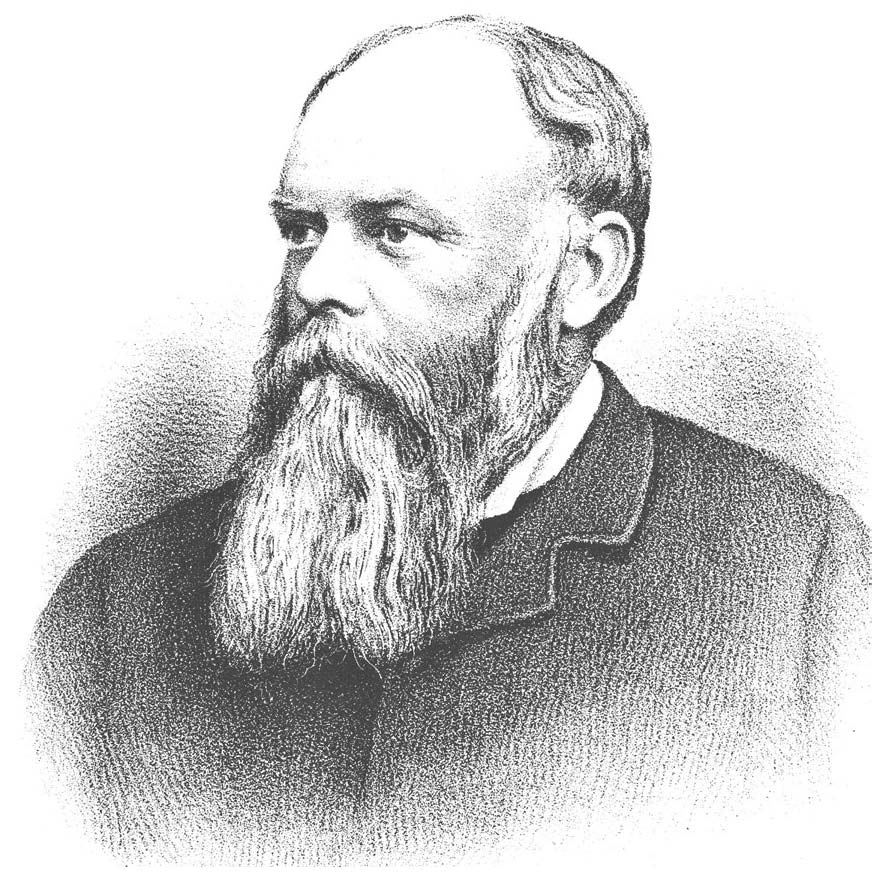

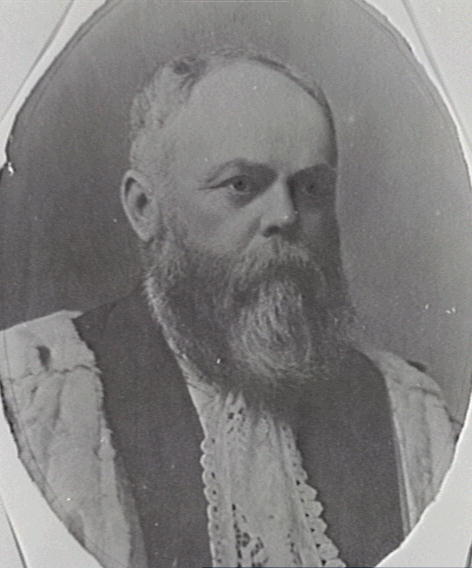
Alderman John Harris, J.P. 1887

John Harris (10 August 1838 – 7 November 1911) was an Irish-born Australian politician.

He was born in Maghera in County Londonderry to John Harris and Nancy Ann McKee. His family migrated to Sydney in 1842. He attended the University of Sydney, but left before graduating to manage the property he had inherited from his father. In 1869 he married Lizzie Henrietta Dingle Page; they had eight children.

He was a Sydney City Councillor from 1873 to 1883, from 1885 to 1900 and from 1902 to 1911, serving as Mayor from 1881 to 1883 and from 1888 to 1889, known for reforming the council and with a reputation for honesty. He was elected to the New South Wales Legislative Assembly for West Sydney at the 1877 election, but he was defeated at the 1880 election. He was returned to the Legislative Assembly as the member for South Sydney at the 1882 election, he did not contest in 1885. He stood as the Liberal Reform candidate for Pyrmont at the 1904 election, but was unsuccessful. He did not hold any ministerial office.

Harris died at Ultimo on 7 November 1911 (aged 73).

New South Wales Legislative Assembly
Preceded by John Booth; Henry Dangar; George Dibbs	Member for West Sydney; 1877 – 1880; With: Angus Cameron; James Merriman; Daniel O'Connor	Succeeded by Francis Abigail; William Martin
Preceded by George Carter; John Davies	Member for South Sydney; 1882 – 1885; With: Joseph Olliffe; William Poole; George Withers	Succeeded by John Davies; Archibald Forsyth; James Toohey
Civic offices
Preceded by Robert Fowler	Mayor of Sydney; 1881 – 1883	Succeeded by John Hardie
Preceded by Alban Riley	Mayor of Sydney; 1888 – 1889	Succeeded by Sydney Burdekin
