= Edward Foxall =

Edward William Foxall (1857 – 24 May 1926), also known by the pseudonym Gizen-No-Teki, was an Australian liberal and free trade activist and one of the more vocal early opponents of the White Australia policy.

Foxall was born in England but attended Sydney Grammar School, becoming an accountant. A Georgist, he was closely involved in liberal circles through the 1880s and 1890s, and in 1900 was appointed English Secretary to the Japanese Consul-General. In 1903 Foxall, financed by the wealthy Free Trade MP Bruce Smith, published Colorphobia: An Exposure of the White Australia Fallacy, in which he sharply criticised the political orthodoxy surrounding White Australia as based on racial prejudice and especially decried Free Traders who supported the Immigration Restriction Act despite its clear anti-free trade implications. Although his views were supported by a small number of federal politicians, including Smith and Senator Edward Pulsford, Foxall's opposition to White Australia placed him squarely outside the political orthodoxy. He died in 1926 in Sydney.
