= Joseph Benjamin Olliffe =

Australian politician

Joseph Benjamin Olliffe (10 September 1835 – 6 September 1930) was an Irish-born Australian politician.

He was born at Cork to innkeeper Joseph Benjamin Olliffe and Ann Osborne. He arrived in New South Wales around 1837 and became a hotel keeper. On 22 May 1861 he married Elizabeth Catherine Callaghan, with whom he had thirteen children. He was elected to the New South Wales Legislative Assembly for South Sydney in 1882, serving until 1887. Olliffe died at Randwick in 1930.

New South Wales Legislative Assembly
Preceded by George Carter; John Davies	Member for South Sydney; 1882–1887; Served alongside: Harris/Toohey, Poole/Davies, Withers/Forsyth	Succeeded by Alban Riley; Bernhard Wise; George Withers
