= Bernhard Wise =

Australian politician (1858–1916)

Bernhard Ringrose Wise QC
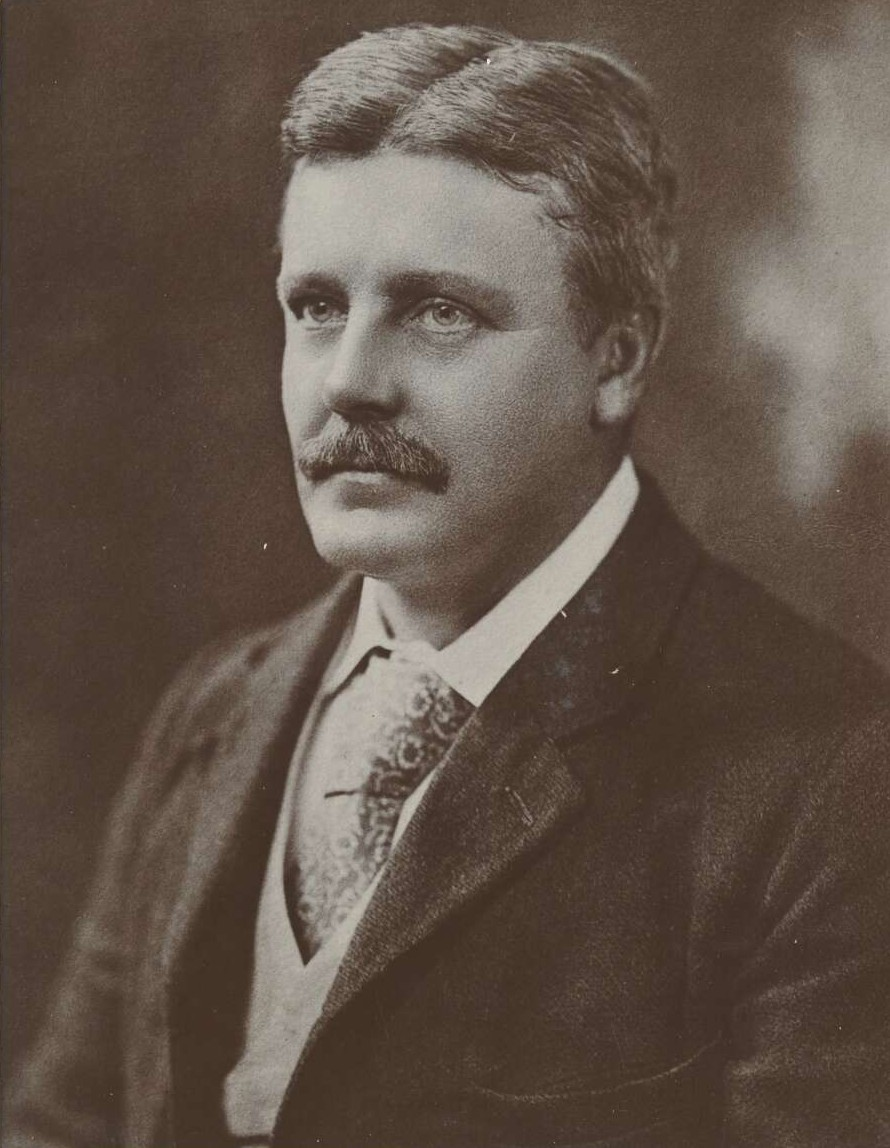
- Wise in 1898 at the Australasian Federal Convention, Melbourne

Member of the New South Wales Legislative Assembly for South Sydney
- In office 5 February 1887 – 19 January 1889 Serving with Alban Riley, James Toohey, George Withers
- Preceded by: Joseph Olliffe
- Succeeded by: William Traill
- In office 17 June 1891 – 25 June 1894 Serving with James Martin, William Traill, James Toohey/William Manning
- Preceded by: Walter Edmunds
- Succeeded by: Seat abolished

Member of the New South Wales Legislative Assembly for Sydney-Flinders
- In office 17 July 1894 – 5 July 1895
- Preceded by: New seat
- Succeeded by: Arthur Nelson

Member of the New South Wales Legislative Assembly for Ashfield
- In office 27 July 1898 – 30 October 1900
- Preceded by: Thomas Bavister
- Succeeded by: Frederick Winchcombe

Personal details
- Born: 10 February 1858 Petersham, New South Wales
- Died: 19 September 1916 (aged 58) Kensington, London, England
- Resting place: Brookwood Cemetery
- Party: Free Trade Party
- Spouse: Lilian Margaret Baird (1884–1916)
- Children: 1 son
- Education: University of Oxford

Bernhard Ringrose Wise KC (10 February 1858 – 19 September 1916), commonly referred to as B. R. Wise, was an Australian politician. He was a social reformer, seen by some as a traitor to his class, but who was not fully accepted by the labour movement. He said, "My failure in Sydney has been so complete—my qualities those which Australia does not recognise, my defects those which Australians dislike most." When he died, William Holman said, "There is hardly anything in our public life which we have to consider to-day that cannot be traced back to his brilliant mind and clear foresight … [Wise] held undisputed supremacy as the foremost debater, foremost thinker and foremost public man in the life of New South Wales".

== Early life ==
Wise was born in the Sydney suburb of Petersham. He was the second son of Edward Wise, a judge of the Supreme Court of New South Wales, and Maria Bate (née Smith). After his father's death in 1865, his mother took the family to Leeds, England to put her sons through grammar school, where their "homemade clothes exposed us to ridicule and bullying". She moved to Rugby and took work, so that Wise could be educated at Rugby School as a day student. Wise won a £90-a-year scholarship to The Queen's College, Oxford.

Wise played rugby football at Rugby School and at Oxford University, the latter likely overlapping with the time of fellow Australian, Charles Gregory Wade.

Wise twice won the amateur mile event of Britain, winning the title at the 1879 AAC Championships and 1881 AAA Championships. His interest in athletics led to his co-founding the Amateur Athletic Association, alongside Clement Jackson, and Montague Shearman. In 1882, he moved to London and worked closely with the social reformer, Arnold Toynbee.

Wise was called to the bar of the Middle Temple in April 1883; and, in August 1883, he returned to Sydney with his fiancée, Lilian Margaret Baird, whom he married in April 1884. He was admitted as a barrister in August 1883 and began to build up a successful practice.

Later in life in November 1898, while the member of the New South Wales Legislative Assembly for Ashfield, he was appointed a Queen's Counsel.

== Political career ==
In February 1887, Wise was elected to the Legislative Assembly for the working class district of South Sydney, advocating direct taxation, payment of members, an eight-hour day and free trade. On 27 May, became Attorney-General of New South Wales in Henry Parkes's fourth ministry. He was defeated at the January 1889 election. In the 1890 maritime strike, he supported the right of the workers to strike, and won back his seat in South Sydney, despite his education and accent.

In 1894, he was returned as member for Sydney-Flinders. His failure to choose sides between Reid and Parkes during a no-confidence debate left him isolated and he was defeated for re-election in 1895.

== Legal reform and latter life ==
Wise was Attorney-General in Lyne's ministry from September 1899 to June 1904 and, from July 1901, was also Minister of Justice. He was now able to put through some of his ideas for social reform and succeeded in passing important legislation, including the Industrial Arbitration Act (1901), the Early Closing Act (1899), the Old-age Pensions Act (1900) and the Women's Franchise Act (1902). He resigned his seat in the Legislative Assembly to accept an appointment to the Legislative Council on 30 October 1900, to pilot the Arbitration bill through the Council. More than once he had a State Children's bill passed by the Council only to have it rejected by the Assembly and its ideas were incorporated in the Neglected Children and Juvenile Offenders Act (1905). He was acting-Premier for part of 1903–04.

When John See resigned as Premier, Wise was considered for appointment, however the Governor Sir Harry Rawson refused considering him to be able but unreliable and in due course asked Thomas Waddell to be Premier. Wise refused to serve in Waddell's ministry.

On 10 March 1908 his seat in the Legislative Council was declared vacant due to his absence for two sessions. In May 1915, he was appointed Agent-General for New South Wales in London. He worked hard despite his ill-health and died suddenly in Kensington in September 1916 (aged 58). His wife survived him with one son.

== Writings ==
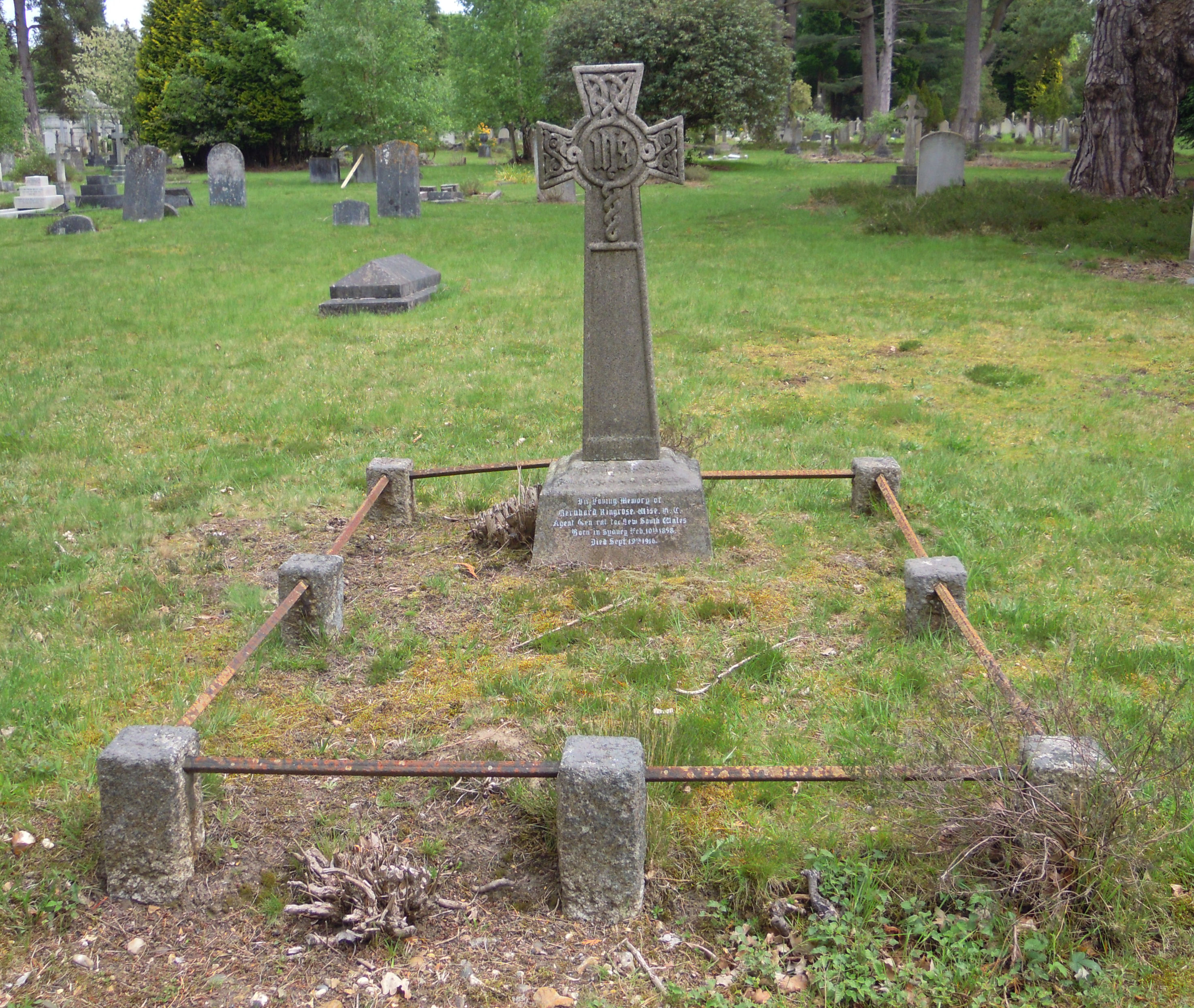
The grave of Bernhard Ringrose Wise in Brookwood Cemetery in 2019

Wise had also at one point socialised with Scottish-Australian poet and bush balladeer Will H. Ogilvie (1869–1963); they also played chess. In a now unidentified English monthly magazine, Wise wrote an article titled Rugby in the 1870s about life at Rugby School, including briefly about innovations in rugby football.

== Personality ==
Wise's personality incited marked responses. "A most agreeable companion" (7th Earl of Beauchamp, NSW Governor), with a "clear musical voice" (the Age), and "attractive manner" (John Quick), but with "inveterate personal and political enemies" (W.B. Melville). "A most unstable politician" (Joseph Carruthers), "a sort of Australian Randolph Churchill" (Review of Reviews), "a rising young man who had somehow never risen" (Beauchamp).

== Works ==
- "Australia and its Critics" . The Empire and the century. London: John Murray. 1905. pp. 424–445.

== Notes ==
Parliament of New South Wales
Political offices
Preceded by William Foster QC	Attorney General; 1887 – 1888	Succeeded by George Simpson QC
Preceded by George Reid QC	Attorney General; 1899 – 1904	Succeeded by James Gannon
Preceded by Robert Fitzgerald	Minister of Justice; 1901 – 1904	Succeeded by Thomas Waddell
New South Wales Legislative Assembly
Preceded by Joseph Olliffe	Member for South Sydney; 1887 – 1889; Served alongside: Riley, Toohey, Withers	Succeeded by William Traill
Preceded by Walter Edmunds	Member for South Sydney; 1891 – 1894; Served alongside: Martin, Traill, Toohey/Manning	Succeeded by Abolished
Preceded by New seat	Member for Sydney-Flinders; 1894 – 1895	Succeeded by Arthur Nelson
Preceded by Thomas Bavister	Member for Ashfield; 1898 – 1900	Succeeded by Frederick Winchcombe
Diplomatic posts
Preceded by Sir Timothy Coghlan	Agent-General for New South Wales; 1915 – 1916	Succeeded by Sir Timothy Coghlan
