= George Withers (politician) =

Australian politician

George Withers (15 June 1843 – 31 March 1908) was an Australian politician.

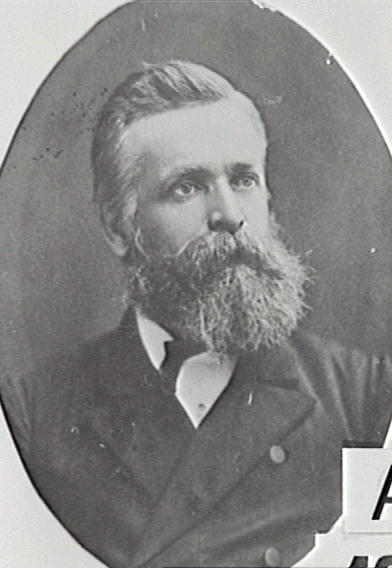
George Withers Alderman for Cook Ward, 2 December 1878 to 30 November 1890

He was born in Parramatta, the son of draper Edwin Augustus Withers. He was apprenticed to a builder at the age of sixteen, and became a partner in the List Brothers firm in 1867. On 18 April 1870 he married Mary Ann Callaghan, with whom he had seven children. In 1880 he was elected to the New South Wales Legislative Assembly for South Sydney. Re-elected in 1882, he was defeated in 1885 but returned in 1887; he retired in 1889. During this period he retired from building and became a land auctioneer. After leaving politics he moved to Perth, where he died in 1908.

New South Wales Legislative Assembly
New seat	Member for South Sydney; 1880–1885; Served alongside: Carter/Harris, Davies/Olliffe, Poole	Succeeded by John Davies; Archibald Forsyth
Preceded by John Davies; Archibald Forsyth	Member for South Sydney; 1887–1889; Served alongside: Alban Riley, James Toohey, Bernhard Wise	Succeeded by Walter Edmunds; James Martin; William Traill
