= Electoral district of South Sydney =

Former state electoral district of New South Wales, Australia

South Sydney was an electoral district for the Legislative Assembly in the Australian state of New South Wales from 1880 to 1894, covering the southern part of the current Sydney central business district, Haymarket, Surry Hills, Moore Park and Chippendale, bordered by George Street, Broadway, City Road, Cleveland Street, South Dowling Street, Dacey Avenue, the western edge of Centennial Park, Moore Park Road, South Dowling Street, Oxford Street and Liverpool Street. It elected four members simultaneously, with voters casting four votes and the first four candidates being elected. For the 1894 election, it was replaced by the single-member electorates of Sydney-Phillip, Sydney-Belmore, Sydney-Flinders and Sydney-Cook.

Elections for the district were held in the general elections of 1880, 1882, 1885, 1887, 1889, and 1891. There was also a by-election in 1887 as a result of Bernhard Wise accepting the office of Attorney-General in the fourth Parkes government.

== Members for South Sydney ==
Member	Party	Period	Member	Party	Period	Member	Party	Period	Member	Party	Period
George Carter	None	1880–1882	John Davies	None	1880–1882	William Poole	None	1880–1885	George Withers	None	1880–1885
John Harris	None	1882–1885	Joseph Olliffe	None	1882–1887	William Poole	None	1880–1885	George Withers	None	1880–1885
James Toohey	None	1885–1887	Joseph Olliffe	None	1882–1887	John Davies	None	1885–1887	Archibald Forsyth	None	1885–1887
James Toohey	Protectionist	1887–1893	Bernhard Wise	Free Trade	1887–1889	George Withers	Free Trade	1887–1889	Alban Riley	Free Trade	1887–1889
James Toohey	Protectionist	1887–1893	William Traill	Protectionist	1889–1894	Walter Edmunds	Protectionist	1889–1891	James Martin	Free Trade	1889–1894
James Toohey	Protectionist	1887–1893	William Traill	Protectionist	1889–1894	Bernhard Wise	Free Trade	1891–1894	James Martin	Free Trade	1889–1894
William Manning	Protectionist	1893–1894	William Traill	Protectionist	1889–1894	Bernhard Wise	Free Trade	1891–1894	James Martin	Free Trade	1889–1894

== Election results ==
1891 New South Wales colonial election: South Sydney Wednesday 17 June
Party	Candidate	Votes	%	±%
Protectionist	William Traill (re-elected 1)	2,917	12.0	
Free Trade	Bernhard Wise (elected 2)	2,808	11.5	
Free Trade	James Martin (re-elected 3)	2,729	11.2	
Protectionist	James Toohey (re-elected 4)	2,662	10.9	
Protectionist	Walter Edmunds (defeated)	2,553	10.5	
Protectionist	George Dibbs	2,510	10.3	
Free Trade	Edward Foxall	2,237	9.2	
Free Trade	John McDonagh	2,136	8.8	
Labour	Frederick Flowers	2,017	8.3	
Labour	W Higgs	1,805	7.4	
Total formal votes		24,374	99.3	
Informal votes		179	0.7	
Turnout		6,754	68.5	
Protectionist hold 2				
Free Trade hold 1, gain 1 from Protectionist				
