= William Poole (Australian politician) =

Australian politician (1828–1902)

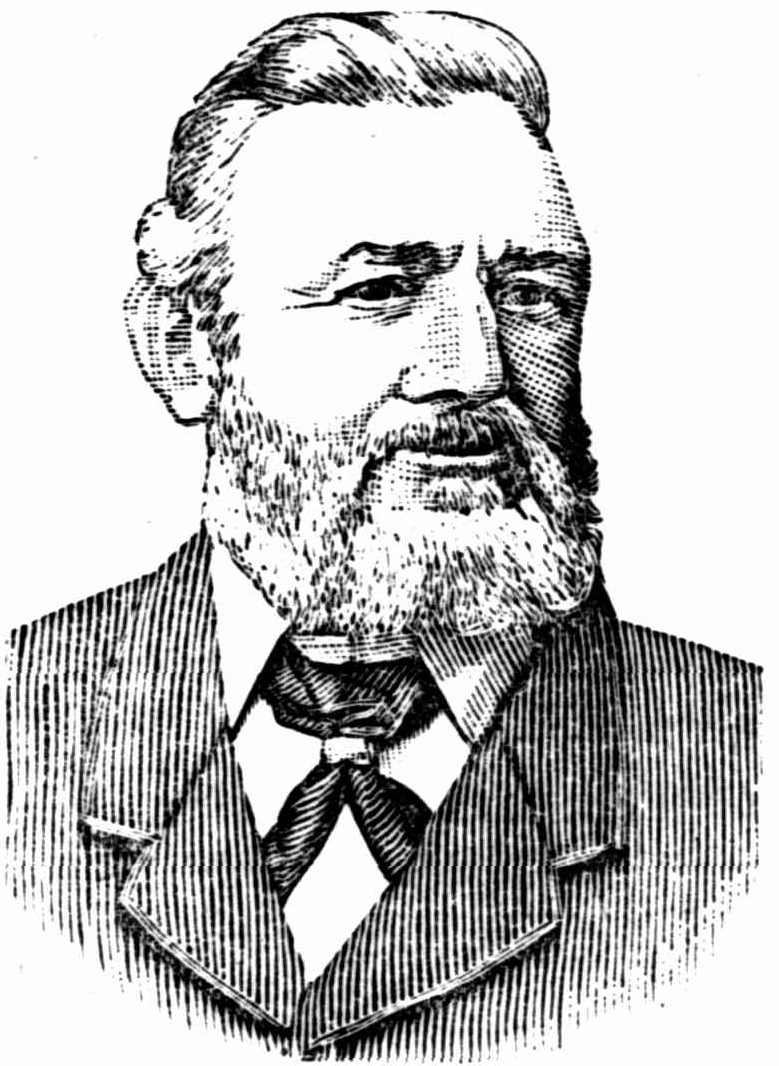

William Thomas Poole (1828 – 7 February 1902) was an English-born Australian politician.

He was born in London to farmer Daniel Cluttenbuck Poole and Eliza Quiddington. He worked as a railway contractor from a young age and in 1851 was shipwrecked, penniless, in South Australia. He worked on New South Wales railways and settled in Sydney. On 31 December 1853 he married Emma Mary Slemmings, with whom he had five children; a second marriage on 21 June 1867 to Mary Sinclair Macfie produced a further six children. He worked as a district surveyor and also owned a sugar mill at Kempsey. In 1880 he was elected to the New South Wales Legislative Assembly for South Sydney, serving until his defeat in 1885. In 1891 he was elected to Redfern council, of which he was mayor from 1895 to 1896. Poole died at Redfern in 1902.

New South Wales Legislative Assembly
New seat	Member for South Sydney; 1880–1885; Served alongside: Carter/Harris, Davies/Olliffe, Withers	Succeeded by John Davies; Archibald Forsyth
Civic offices
Preceded by William Davis	Mayor of Redfern; 1895 – 1896	Succeeded by George Richard Parkes
