= Candidates of the 1887 New South Wales colonial election =

This is a list of candidates for the 1887 New South Wales colonial election. The election was held from 4 February to 26 February 1887.

This was the first election at which there were recognisable political parties in New South Wales: the Free Trade Party of Premier Sir Henry Parkes, and the Protectionist Party. In general, candidates classified as independent protectionists were protectionists who supported Parkes, while independent free traders were free traders who opposed him.

== Retiring Members ==
Bourke MLAs Russell Barton and William Sawers had resigned on 2 December 1886 and a poll held, however parliament was dissolved before the writ was returned.

- Ezekiel Baker MLA (Carcoar)
- Edmund Barton MLA (East Sydney) – appointed to Legislative Council
- Alexander Bolton MLA (Murrumbidgee)
- Michael Burke MLA (Tamworth)
- Robert Butcher MLA (Paddington)
- Charles Collins MLA (Namoi)
- Walter Coonan MLA (Forbes)
- John Cramsie MLA (Balranald)
- Mark Hammond MLA (Canterbury)
- Patrick Hogan MLA (Richmond)
- Frederick Humphery MLA (Shoalhaven)
- Sir Patrick Jennings MLA (Bogan)
- William Judd MLA (Canterbury)
- Lewis Lloyd MLA (West Macquarie)
- Joseph Olliffe MLA (South Sydney)
- William Proctor MLA (New England)
- Edward Quin MLA (Wentworth)
- Septimus Stephen MLA (Canterbury)
- Francis Tait MLA (Argyle)
- Robert White MLA (Gloucester)
- Thomas Williamson MLA (Redfern)
- Robert Wisdom MLA (Morpeth)

== Legislative Assembly ==
Sitting members are shown in bold text. Successful candidates are highlighted in the relevant colour and marked with an asterisk (*).

Electorates are arranged chronologically from the day the poll was held. Because of the sequence of polling, some sitting members who were defeated in their constituencies were then able to contest other constituencies later in the polling period. On the second occasion, these members are shown in italic text.

Electorate	Protectionist candidates	Free Trade candidates	Other candidates
Friday 4 February 1887
St Leonards		**Isaac Ives***; **Sir Henry Parkes***	
Saturday 5 February 1887
Balmain	Thomas Belgrave; **Solomon Hyam**; Aaron Wheeler	**Jacob Garrard***; **John Hawthorne***; Frank Smith*	
East Sydney	William Traill	**Sydney Burdekin***; William McMillan*; **George Reid***; John Street*	
Glebe	Stephen Byrne	William Bailey; Michael Chapman*; **John Meeks**; **William Wilkinson***	
Goulburn		**William Teece***	
Newcastle	**James Fletcher***	James Ellis*; **George Lloyd**	
Newtown	**James Smith**	**William Foster***; **Frederick Gibbes***; Nicholas Hawken*	
Parramatta		**Hugh Taylor***	
Redfern	Alfred Fremlin; Peter Howe; **Arthur Renwick**	James Farnell*; William Schey*; William Stephen*; **John Sutherland***	
South Sydney	Edward Bennett; **John Davies**; **Archibald Forsyth**; Alfred Miller; **James Toohey***	Alban Riley*; Bernhard Wise*; George Withers*	Michael Simmons (Ind)
West Sydney	Arthur Nelson; William Westman; **John Young**	**Francis Abigail***; **Alexander Kethel***; George Merriman*; **Daniel O'Connor***; William Pritchard	
Monday 7 February 1887
Nepean		Samuel Lees*	**Thomas Smith** (Ind FT)
Wednesday 9 February 1887
Bathurst	**Francis Suttor**	William Cortis*	
Hastings and Manning	**Walter Targett**	**Charles Roberts***; **James Young***	
Orange	**Thomas Dalton***; George Hawke	**William Clarke***	
Paddington	William Allen	Alfred Allen*; John McLaughlin; **John Neild***; **John Shepherd**; **William Trickett***	Edwin Bottrell (Ind)
Thursday 10 February 1887
East Maitland		**James Brunker***	
Grafton	**John See***		
New England	**Henry Copeland***; Charles Givney	**James Inglis***	
Friday 11 February 1887
Albury	**George Day***	William Smith	
Argyle	Thomas Rose	Edward Ball*; **William Holborow***	
Boorowa	**Thomas Slattery***		
Camden	James Hanrahan	**Thomas Garrett***; **John Kidd**; William McCourt*	
Clarence	John McFarlane*	**John Purves**	
East Macquarie	Paddy Crick	**Sydney Smith***; James Tonkin*	
West Maitland		**Richard Thompson***	
Saturday 12 February 1887
Canterbury	John Watkin	William Cameron; Joseph Carruthers*; William Davis*; **William Henson***; Alexander Hutchison*; Richard McCoy; George Wallace; John Wheeler; James Wilshire	
Carcoar	Francis Freehill	**Charles Garland***; Charles Jeanneret*	
Central Cumberland	**Nathaniel Bull**	Frank Farnell*; **Andrew McCulloch***; John Nobbs; **Varney Parkes***	
Hartley	Brisbane Doyle; John Young	John Hurley*	Richard Inch (Ind FT)
Hawkesbury		**Alexander Bowman***	John Griffin (Ind FT); Thomas Primrose (Ind)
Hunter		**John Burns***	
Kiama		**Angus Cameron***	
Molong			**Andrew Ross*** (Ind Prot)
Monday 14 February 1887
Braidwood	**Alexander Ryrie***	John Lingen	
Forbes	Joseph Reymond; **Alfred Stokes***	Henry Cooke*	
Patrick's Plains		**Albert Gould***	
Shoalhaven	William Lovegrove	William Martin*	
Tuesday 15 February 1887
Hume	**James Hayes***; **William Lyne***		
Mudgee	John Carden; Richard Rouse; **William Wall***	Reginald Black*; John Haynes; **Adolphus Taylor***	
Wednesday 16 February 1887
Grenfell	**Robert Vaughn***	A L Park	
Gundagai	Robert Newman		**Jack Want*** (Ind FT)
Gunnedah	Thomas Goodwin*	J Poole	
Morpeth	John Bowes*	Myles McRae	
Thursday 17 February 1887
Eden	**Henry Clarke***; **James Garvan***		
Gwydir	**Thomas Hassall***		
Northumberland	Andrew Love; **Ninian Melville***; John Osborne; Thomas Walker*	Nicholas Downing	**Joseph Creer*** (Ind Prot)
West Macquarie	Paddy Crick; John Hughes	Fergus Smith*	
Friday 18 February 1887
Illawarra	**Andrew Lysaght**	Francis Woodward*	
Upper Hunter	William Abbott	**Robert Fitzgerald***; **Thomas Hungerford**; John McElhone*	
Saturday 19 February 1887
Glen Innes	Alexander Hutchison	George Matheson*	
Inverell	George Cruickshank	**Samuel Moore***	
Queanbeyan	**Edward O'Sullivan***	George Tompsitt	
Tumut	**Travers Jones***	Nathaniel Emanuel	
Wellington	**David Ferguson***	W J Hill	
Wollombi		**Richard Stevenson***; George Watt	
Yass Plains	**Thomas Colls***	Henry Donaldson	
Young	**James Mackinnon***; **Gerald Spring**	James Gordon*; William Lucas	
Monday 21 February 1887
Tamworth	William Dowel*; **Robert Levien***	Eustace Pratt; William Tribe	
Tenterfield	William Richardson	**Charles Lee***	
Tuesday 22 February 1887
Bourke	William Willis	Thomas Waddell*; Alexander Wilson*	
Namoi		George Dale; Thomas Dangar*	
Wednesday 23 February 1887
Bogan	Rene Berteaux; **George Cass**	John Kelly*; Joseph Penzer*	
Gloucester	George Perry	John Hart; John McLaughlin; Jonathan Seaver*	
Macleay	**Robert Smith***		Enoch Rudder (Ind Prot)
Thursday 24 February 1887
Balranald			Alexander Cameron (Ind); Allen Lakeman* (Ind Prot); **Robert Wilkinson*** (Ind FT)
Murrumbidgee	John Gale*; **James Gormly***	Robert Reynolds	**George Dibbs*** (Ind FT)
Friday 25 February 1887
Monaro	**Henry Dawson***; **Harold Stephen**	Herbert Elles	Thomas O'Mara* (Ind Prot)
Saturday 26 February 1887
Durham		**Herbert Brown***	John Wade (Ind FT)
Murray	**Robert Barbour***; **John Chanter***	William Virgoe	
Richmond	Frederick Crouch*; **Thomas Ewing***	James Barrie; R E De B Lopez	
Wentworth	**Joseph Abbott***; **Thomas Browne**; **William Fergusson**		**William MacGregor*** (Ind FT)

== See also ==
- Members of the New South Wales Legislative Assembly, 1887–1889
