= Results of the 1887 New South Wales colonial election =

Colonial election for New South Wales, Australia in February 1887

New South Wales colonial election, 4 – 26 February 1887 Legislative Assembly << 1885–1889 >>
Enrolled voters					
Votes cast	128,787		Turnout	57.84	−3.26
Informal votes	2,275		Informal	1.74	−0.27
Summary of votes by party
Party	Primary votes	%	Swing	Seats	Change
Free Trade	78,238	60.75	n/a	79	n/a
Protectionist	42,354	32.89	n/a	37	n/a
Ind. Free Trade	4,159	3.23	n/a	4	n/a
Ind. Protectionist	3,105	2.41	n/a	4	n/a
Independent	931	0.72	n/a	0	n/a
Total	252,004			124	

The 1887 New South Wales colonial election was for 124 members representing 74 electoral districts. The election was conducted on the basis of a simple majority or first-past-the-post voting system. In this election there were 35 multi-member districts returning 87 members and 37 single member districts giving a total of 124 members. In the multi-member districts each elector could vote for as many candidates as there were vacancies. 13 districts were uncontested. This was the first election at which there were recognisable political parties. The average number of enrolled voters per seat was 1,984, ranging from Boorowa (1,103) to Canterbury (3,161).

== Election results ==
=== Albury ===
1887 New South Wales colonial election: Albury Friday 11 February
Party	Candidate	Votes	%	±%
Protectionist	George Day (re-elected)	513	58.6	
Free Trade	William Smith	363	41.4	
Total formal votes		876	98.0	
Informal votes		18	2.0	
Turnout		894	61.8	

=== Argyle ===
1887 New South Wales colonial election: Argyle Friday 11 February
Party	Candidate	Votes	%	±%
Free Trade	William Holborow (re-elected 1)	975	35.7	
Free Trade	Edward Ball (elected 2)	970	35.5	
Protectionist	Thomas Rose	789	28.9	
Total formal votes		2,734	99.6	
Informal votes		11	0.4	
Turnout		1,723	62.5	

=== Balmain ===
1887 New South Wales colonial election: Balmain Saturday 5 February
Party	Candidate	Votes	%	±%
Free Trade	Jacob Garrard (re-elected 1)	3,012	26.6	
Free Trade	John Hawthorne (re-elected 2)	2,915	25.8	
Free Trade	Frank Smith (elected 3)	2,717	24.0	
Protectionist	Solomon Hyam (defeated)	1,585	14.0	
Protectionist	Thomas Belgrave	723	6.4	
Protectionist	Aaron Wheeler	353	3.1	
Total formal votes		11,305	99.1	
Informal votes		108	1.0	
Turnout		4,640	58.7	

=== Balranald ===
1887 New South Wales colonial election: Balranald Thursday 24 February
Party	Candidate	Votes	%	±%
Ind. Protectionist	Allen Lakeman (elected 1)	946	40.4	
Ind. Free Trade	Robert Wilkinson (re-elected 2)	777	33.2	
Independent	Alexander Cameron	621	26.5	
Total formal votes		2,344	98.2	
Informal votes		43	1.8	
Turnout		1,589	39.4	

The other sitting member John Cramsie did not contest the election.

=== Bathurst ===
1887 New South Wales colonial election: Bathurst Wednesday 9 February
Party	Candidate	Votes	%	±%
Free Trade	William Cortis (elected)	773	59.9	
Protectionist	Francis Suttor (defeated)	517	40.1	
Total formal votes		1,290	98.6	
Informal votes		18	1.4	
Turnout		1,308	70.2	

=== The Bogan ===
1887 New South Wales colonial election: The Bogan Wednesday 23 February
Party	Candidate	Votes	%	±%
Free Trade	John Kelly (elected 1)	1,422	31.4	
Free Trade	Joseph Penzer (elected 2)	1,352	29.9	
Protectionist	George Cass (defeated)	1,179	26.1	
Protectionist	Rene Berteaux	570	12.6	
Total formal votes		4,523	99.6	
Informal votes		19	0.4	
Turnout		2,359	48.4	

The other sitting member Patrick Jennings did not contest the election.

=== Boorowa ===
1887 New South Wales colonial election: Boorowa Monday 7 February
Party	Candidate	Votes	%	±%
Protectionist	Thomas Slattery (re-elected)	unopposed		

=== Bourke ===
1887 New South Wales colonial election: Bourke Tuesday 22 February
Party	Candidate	Votes	%	±%
Free Trade	Thomas Waddell (elected 1)	1,220	38.7	
Free Trade	Alexander Wilson (elected 2)	996	31.6	
Protectionist	William Willis	934	29.7	
Total formal votes		3,150	99.3	
Informal votes		21	0.7	
Turnout		2,047	46.2	

The sitting members were Russell Barton and William Sawers, both of whom resigned on 2 December 1886. A writ was issued for a by-election, which was held on 21 January 1887, with the result Thomas Waddell 1019, William Willis 833 and Alexander Wilson 682. The writ was not returned however as the parliament was dissolved on 26 January.

=== Braidwood ===
1887 New South Wales colonial election: Braidwood Monday 14 February
Party	Candidate	Votes	%	±%
Protectionist	Alexander Ryrie (re-elected)	535	58.3	
Free Trade	John Lingen	383	41.7	
Total formal votes		918	97.6	
Informal votes		23	2.4	
Turnout		939	62.6	

=== Camden ===
1887 New South Wales colonial election: Camden Friday 11 February
Party	Candidate	Votes	%	±%
Free Trade	Thomas Garrett (re-elected 1)	1,740	33.3	
Free Trade	William McCourt (elected 2)	1,591	30.5	
Free Trade	John Kidd (defeated)	1,485	28.4	
Protectionist	James Hanrahan	407	7.8	
Total formal votes		5,223	98.9	
Informal votes		58	1.1	
Turnout		3,086	62.0	

=== Canterbury ===
1887 New South Wales colonial election: Canterbury Saturday 12 February
Party	Candidate	Votes	%	±%
Free Trade	Joseph Carruthers (elected 1)	4,302	19.8	
Free Trade	Alexander Hutchison (elected 2)	3,013	13.9	
Free Trade	William Henson (re-elected 3)	2,385	11.0	
Free Trade	William Davis (elected 4)	2,264	10.4	
Free Trade	James Wilshire	2,179	10.0	
Free Trade	William Cameron	2,101	9.7	
Free Trade	John Wheeler	2,028	9.3	
Protectionist	John Watkin	1,507	6.9	
Free Trade	Richard McCoy	1,477	6.8	
Free Trade	George Wallace	504	2.3	
Total formal votes		21,760	99.3	
Informal votes		160	0.7	
Turnout		6,776	53.6	

Three of the sitting members, Mark Hammond, William Judd and Septimus Stephen, did not contest the election.

=== Carcoar ===
1887 New South Wales colonial election: Carcoar Saturday 12 February
Party	Candidate	Votes	%	±%
Free Trade	Charles Garland (re-elected 1)	1,160	38.7	
Free Trade	Charles Jeanneret (elected 2)	1,014	33.8	
Protectionist	Francis Freehill	824	27.5	
Total formal votes		2,998	100.0	
Informal votes		0	0.0	
Turnout		1,940	55.2	

The other sitting member Ezekiel Baker did not contest the election.

=== The Clarence ===
1887 New South Wales colonial election: The Clarence Friday 11 February
Party	Candidate	Votes	%	±%
Protectionist	John McFarlane (elected)	646	55.7	
Free Trade	John Purves (defeated)	513	44.3	
Total formal votes		1,159	98.9	
Informal votes		13	1.1	
Turnout		1,172	60.1	

=== Central Cumberland ===
1887 New South Wales colonial election: Central Cumberland Saturday 12 February
Party	Candidate	Votes	%	±%
Free Trade	Varney Parkes (re-elected 1)	2,404	25.8	
Free Trade	Andrew McCulloch (re-elected 2)	2,119	22.7	
Free Trade	Frank Farnell (elected 3)	1,861	19.9	
Free Trade	John Nobbs	1,775	19.0	
Protectionist	Nathaniel Bull (defeated)	1,173	12.6	
Total formal votes		9,332	99.3	
Informal votes		67	0.7	
Turnout		4,040	51.3	

=== Durham ===
1887 New South Wales colonial election: Durham Saturday 26 February
Party	Candidate	Votes	%	±%
Free Trade	Herbert Brown (re-elected)	591	57.9	
Ind. Free Trade	John Wade	429	42.1	
Total formal votes		1,020	97.1	
Informal votes		30	2.9	
Turnout		1,050	70.4	

=== East Macquarie ===
1887 New South Wales colonial election: East Macquarie Friday 11 February
Party	Candidate	Votes	%	±%
Free Trade	Sydney Smith (re-elected 1)	951	42.2	
Free Trade	James Tonkin (elected 2)	795	35.2	
Protectionist	Paddy Crick	510	22.6	
Total formal votes		2,256	99.5	
Informal votes		11	0.5	
Turnout		1,264	45.1	

The other sitting member John Shepherd unsuccessfully contested Paddington.

=== East Maitland ===
1887 New South Wales colonial election: East Maitland Tuesday 8 February
Party	Candidate	Votes	%	±%
Free Trade	James Brunker (re-elected)	unopposed		

=== East Sydney ===
1887 New South Wales colonial election: East Sydney Saturday 5 February
Party	Candidate	Votes	%	±%
Free Trade	Sydney Burdekin (re-elected 1)	4,238	23.8	
Free Trade	George Reid (re-elected 2)	4,108	23.1	
Free Trade	William McMillan (elected 3)	4,025	22.6	
Free Trade	John Street (elected 4)	3,605	20.2	
Protectionist	William Traill	1,846	10.4	
Total formal votes		17,822	99.7	
Informal votes		63	0.4	
Turnout		6,883	63.2	

The two other sitting members Edmund Barton was appointed to the Legislative Council and Henry Copeland successfully contested New England.

=== Eden ===
1887 New South Wales colonial election: Eden Friday 11 February
Party	Candidate	Votes	%	±%
Protectionist	Henry Clarke (re-elected)	unopposed		
Protectionist	James Garvan (re-elected)	unopposed		

=== Forbes ===
1887 New South Wales colonial election: Forbes Monday 14 February
Party	Candidate	Votes	%	±%
Protectionist	Alfred Stokes (re-elected 1)	788	36.6	
Free Trade	Henry Cooke (elected 2)	706	32.8	
Protectionist	Joseph Reymond	657	30.5	
Total formal votes		2,151	99.3	
Informal votes		16	0.7	
Turnout		1,273	52.8	

The other sitting member Walter Coonan did not contest the election.

=== The Glebe ===
1887 New South Wales colonial election: The Glebe Saturday 5 February
Party	Candidate	Votes	%	±%
Free Trade	William Wilkinson (re-elected 1)	1,332	36.0	
Free Trade	Michael Chapman (elected 2)	1,261	34.0	
Free Trade	John Meeks (defeated)	503	13.6	
Free Trade	William Bailey	384	10.4	
Protectionist	Stephen Byrne	225	6.1	
Total formal votes		3,705	97.8	
Informal votes		84	2.2	
Turnout		2,448	67.0	

=== Glen Innes ===
1887 New South Wales colonial election: Glen Innes Saturday 19 February
Party	Candidate	Votes	%	±%
Free Trade	George Matheson (elected)	604	51.6	
Protectionist	Alexander Hutchison	567	48.4	
Total formal votes		1,171	98.3	
Informal votes		20	1.7	
Turnout		1,191	42.1	

The sitting member William Fergusson unsuccessfully contested Wentworth.

=== Gloucester ===
1887 New South Wales colonial election: Gloucester Wednesday 23 February
Party	Candidate	Votes	%	±%
Free Trade	Jonathan Seaver (elected)	434	45.4	
Free Trade	John Hart	267	27.9	
Free Trade	John McLaughlin	207	21.7	
Protectionist	George Perry	48	5.0	
Total formal votes		956	98.6	
Informal votes		14	1.4	
Turnout		970	59.2	

The sitting member Robert White did not contest the election. John McLaughlin had been unsuccessful in contesting Paddington on 9 February.

=== Goulburn ===
1887 New South Wales colonial election: Goulburn Thursday 3 February
Party	Candidate	Votes	%	±%
Free Trade	William Teece (re-elected)	unopposed		

=== Grafton ===
1887 New South Wales colonial election: Grafton Saturday 5 February
Party	Candidate	Votes	%	±%
Protectionist	John See (re-elected)	unopposed		

=== Grenfell ===
1887 New South Wales colonial election: Grenfell Wednesday 16 February
Party	Candidate	Votes	%	±%
Protectionist	Robert Vaughn (re-elected)	431	53.3	
Free Trade	A L Park	378	46.7	
Total formal votes		809	98.2	
Informal votes		15	1.8	
Turnout		824	51.6	

=== Gundagai ===
1887 New South Wales colonial election: Gundagai Wednesday 16 February
Party	Candidate	Votes	%	±%
Ind. Free Trade	Jack Want (re-elected)	701	55.3	
Protectionist	Robert Newman	566	44.7	
Total formal votes		1,267	98.5	
Informal votes		19	1.5	
Turnout		1,286	49.2	

=== Gunnedah ===
1887 New South Wales colonial election: Gunnedah Wednesday 16 February
Party	Candidate	Votes	%	±%
Protectionist	Thomas Goodwin (elected)	616	62.7	
Free Trade	J Poole	367	37.3	
Total formal votes		983	95.4	
Informal votes		47	4.6	
Turnout		1,030	50.3	

The sitting member Joseph Abbott successfully contested Wentworth.

=== The Gwydir ===
1887 New South Wales colonial election: The Gwydir Thursday 10 February
Party	Candidate	Votes	%	±%
Protectionist	Thomas Hassall (re-elected)	unopposed		

=== Hartley ===
1887 New South Wales colonial election: Hartley Saturday 12 February
Party	Candidate	Votes	%	±%
Free Trade	John Hurley (elected)	619	44.8	
Ind. Protectionist	Richard Inch	333	24.1	
Protectionist	John Young	245	17.7	
Protectionist	Brisbane Doyle	184	13.3	
Total formal votes		1,381	97.9	
Informal votes		30	2.1	
Turnout		1,411	64.1	

The sitting member Walter Targett unsuccessfully contested The Hastings and Manning.

=== The Hastings and Manning ===
1887 New South Wales colonial election: The Hastings and Manning Wednesday 9 February
Party	Candidate	Votes	%	±%
Free Trade	Charles Roberts (re-elected 1)	1,195	40.7	
Free Trade	James Young (re-elected 2)	1,107	37.7	
Protectionist	Walter Targett (defeated)	635	21.6	
Total formal votes		2,937	99.5	
Informal votes		15	0.5	
Turnout		1,628	55.5	

Walter Targett was the member for Hartley

=== The Hawkesbury ===
1887 New South Wales colonial election: The Hawkesbury Saturday 12 February
Party	Candidate	Votes	%	±%
Free Trade	Alexander Bowman (re-elected)	758	46.3	
Ind. Free Trade	John Griffin	657	40.1	
Independent	Thomas Primrose	222	13.6	
Total formal votes		1,637	97.7	
Informal votes		38	2.3	
Turnout		1,675	73.4	

=== The Hume ===
1887 New South Wales colonial election: The Hume Wednesday 9 February
Party	Candidate	Votes	%	±%
Protectionist	William Lyne (re-elected)	unopposed		
Protectionist	James Hayes (re-elected)	unopposed		

=== The Hunter ===
1887 New South Wales colonial election: The Hunter Monday 7 February
Party	Candidate	Votes	%	±%
Free Trade	John Burns (re-elected)	unopposed		

=== Illawarra ===
1887 New South Wales colonial election: Illawarra Friday 18 February
Party	Candidate	Votes	%	±%
Free Trade	Francis Woodward (elected)	939	55.7	
Protectionist	Andrew Lysaght Sr. (defeated)	748	44.3	
Total formal votes		1,687	98.3	
Informal votes		29	1.7	
Turnout		1,716	59.7	

=== Inverell ===
1887 New South Wales colonial election: Inverell Saturday 19 February
Party	Candidate	Votes	%	±%
Free Trade	Samuel Moore (re-elected)	763	60.1	
Protectionist	George Cruickshank	507	39.9	
Total formal votes		1,270	98.4	
Informal votes		21	1.6	
Turnout		1,291	63.0	

=== Kiama ===
1887 New South Wales colonial election: Kiama Wednesday 9 February
Party	Candidate	Votes	%	±%
Free Trade	Angus Cameron (re-elected)	unopposed		

=== The Macleay ===
1887 New South Wales colonial election: The Macleay Wednesday 23 February
Party	Candidate	Votes	%	±%
Protectionist	Robert Smith (re-elected)	945	58.0	
Ind. Protectionist	Enoch Rudder	684	42.0	
Total formal votes		1,629	98.1	
Informal votes		31	1.9	
Turnout		1,660	54.8	

=== Molong ===
1887 New South Wales colonial election: Molong Tuesday 8 February
Party	Candidate	Votes	%	±%
Ind. Protectionist	Andrew Ross (re-elected)	unopposed		

=== Monaro ===
1887 New South Wales colonial election: Monaro Friday 25 February
Party	Candidate	Votes	%	±%
Ind. Protectionist	Thomas O'Mara (elected 1)	1,148	38.0	
Protectionist	Henry Dawson (re-elected 2)	783	25.9	
Protectionist	Harold Stephen (defeated)	637	21.1	
Free Trade	Herbert Elles	453	15.0	
Total formal votes		3,021	99.6	
Informal votes		12	0.4	
Turnout		1,732	55.7	

=== Morpeth ===
1887 New South Wales colonial election: Morpeth Wednesday 16 February
Party	Candidate	Votes	%	±%
Protectionist	John Bowes (elected)	541	58.2	
Free Trade	Myles McRae	388	41.8	
Total formal votes		929	98.7	
Informal votes		12	1.3	
Turnout		941	75.3	

The sitting member Robert Wisdom did not contest the election.

=== Mudgee ===
1887 New South Wales colonial election: Mudgee Tuesday 15 February
Party	Candidate	Votes	%	±%
Free Trade	Adolphus Taylor (re-elected 1)	1,219	20.2	
Protectionist	William Wall (re-elected 2)	1,071	17.8	
Free Trade	Reginald Black (elected 3)	1,056	17.5	
Protectionist	Richard Rouse	990	16.4	
Free Trade	John Haynes	884	14.7	
Protectionist	John Carden	805	13.4	
Total formal votes		6,025	99.3	
Informal votes		40	0.7	
Turnout		2,231	56.7	

The other sitting member Thomas Browne unsuccessfully contested Wentworth.

=== The Murray ===
1887 New South Wales colonial election: The Murray Saturday 26 February
Party	Candidate	Votes	%	±%
Protectionist	John Chanter (re-elected 1)	836	35.7	
Protectionist	Robert Barbour (re-elected 2)	759	32.4	
Free Trade	William Virgoe	750	32.0	
Total formal votes		2,345	98.9	
Informal votes		26	1.1	
Turnout		1,377	47.8	

=== The Murrumbidgee ===
1887 New South Wales colonial election: The Murrumbidgee Thursday 24 February
Party	Candidate	Votes	%	±%
Protectionist	James Gormly (re-elected 1)	2,226	31.5	
Protectionist	John Gale (elected 2)	1,897	26.9	
Ind. Free Trade	George Dibbs (re-elected 3)	1,630	23.1	
Free Trade	Robert Reynolds	1,310	18.6	
Total formal votes		7,063	99.6	
Informal votes		31	0.4	
Turnout		3,214	40.5	

The other sitting member Alexander Bolton did not contest the election.

=== The Namoi ===
1887 New South Wales colonial election: The Namoi Tuesday 22 February
Party	Candidate	Votes	%	±%
Free Trade	Thomas Dangar (elected)	762	65.0	
Free Trade	George Dale	411	35.0	
Total formal votes		1,173	98.3	
Informal votes		20	1.7	
Turnout		1,193	47.4	

The sitting member Charles Collins did not contest the election.

=== The Nepean ===
1887 New South Wales colonial election: The Nepean Monday 7 February
Party	Candidate	Votes	%	±%
Free Trade	Samuel Lees (elected)	701	50.7	
Ind. Free Trade	Thomas Smith (defeated)	683	49.4	
Total formal votes		1,384	98.5	
Informal votes		21	1.5	
Turnout		1,405	75.5	

=== New England ===
1887 New South Wales colonial election: New England Thursday 10 February
Party	Candidate	Votes	%	±%
Free Trade	James Inglis (re-elected 1)	1,371	46.1	
Protectionist	Henry Copeland (re-elected 2)	999	33.6	
Protectionist	Charles Givney	603	20.3	
Total formal votes		2,973	99.0	
Informal votes		31	1.0	
Turnout		2,108	53.9	

=== Newcastle ===
1887 New South Wales colonial election: Newcastle Saturday 5 February
Party	Candidate	Votes	%	±%
Free Trade	James Ellis (elected 1)	2,724	41.2	
Protectionist	James Fletcher (re-elected 2)	2,281	34.5	
Free Trade	George Lloyd (defeated)	1,603	24.3	
Total formal votes		6,608	99.3	
Informal votes		44	0.7	
Turnout		3,890	75.4	

=== Newtown ===
1887 New South Wales colonial election: Newtown Saturday 5 February
Party	Candidate	Votes	%	±%
Free Trade	William Foster (re-elected 1)	2,404	29.6	
Free Trade	Frederick Gibbes (re-elected 2)	2,321	28.6	
Free Trade	Nicholas Hawken (elected 3)	2,106	26.0	
Protectionist	James Smith (defeated)	1,284	15.8	
Total formal votes		8,115	99.3	
Informal votes		57	0.7	
Turnout		3,446	56.3	

=== Northumberland ===
1887 New South Wales colonial election: Northumberland Thursday 17 February
Party	Candidate	Votes	%	±%
Protectionist	Ninian Melville (re-elected 1)	2,399	23.2	
Protectionist	Thomas Walker (elected 2)	2,323	22.5	
Ind. Protectionist	Joseph Creer (re-elected 3)	2,069	20.0	
Protectionist	John Osborne	1,952	18.9	
Free Trade	Nicholas Downing	1,010	9.8	
Protectionist	Andrew Love	578	5.6	
Total formal votes		10,331	99.3	
Informal votes		71	0.7	
Turnout		4,117	75.1	
		(1 new seat)		

=== Orange ===
1887 New South Wales colonial election: Orange Wednesday 9 February
Party	Candidate	Votes	%	±%
Protectionist	Thomas Dalton (re-elected 1)	997	37.4	
Free Trade	William Clarke (re-elected 2)	920	34.5	
Protectionist	George Hawke	751	28.2	
Total formal votes		2,668	99.2	
Informal votes		21	0.8	
Turnout		1,857	69.2	

=== Paddington ===
1887 New South Wales colonial election: Paddington Wednesday 9 February
Party	Candidate	Votes	%	±%
Free Trade	John Neild (re-elected 1)	2,601	22.3	
Free Trade	Alfred Allen (elected 2)	2,271	19.5	
Free Trade	William Trickett (re-elected 3)	2,230	19.1	
Free Trade	John McLaughlin	2,139	18.3	
Free Trade	John Shepherd (defeated)	1,630	14.0	
Protectionist	William Allen	715	6.1	
Independent	Edwin Bottrell	89	0.8	
Total formal votes		11,675	98.7	
Informal votes		151	1.3	
Turnout		5,159	66.6	

The other sitting member Robert Butcher did not contest the election. John Shepherd was the member for East Macquarie. John McLaughlin also unsuccessfully contested Gloucester.

=== Parramatta ===
1887 New South Wales colonial election: Parramatta Thursday 3 February
Party	Candidate	Votes	%	±%
Free Trade	Hugh Taylor (re-elected)	unopposed		

=== Patrick's Plains ===
1887 New South Wales colonial election: Patrick's Plains Thursday 10 February
Party	Candidate	Votes	%	±%
Free Trade	Albert Gould (re-elected)	unopposed		

=== Queanbeyan ===
1887 New South Wales colonial election: Queanbeyan Saturday 19 February
Party	Candidate	Votes	%	±%
Protectionist	Edward O'Sullivan (re-elected)	707	56.8	
Free Trade	George Tompsitt	537	43.2	
Total formal votes		1,244	98.4	
Informal votes		20	1.6	
Turnout		1,264	48.5	

=== Redfern ===
1887 New South Wales colonial election: Redfern Saturday 5 February
Party	Candidate	Votes	%	±%
Free Trade	John Sutherland (re-elected 1)	3,582	23.2	
Free Trade	James Farnell (elected 2)	2,644	17.1	
Free Trade	William Stephen (elected 3)	2,599	16.8	
Free Trade	William Schey (elected 4)	2,407	15.6	
Protectionist	Arthur Renwick (defeated)	1,938	12.6	
Protectionist	Peter Howe	1,803	11.7	
Protectionist	Alfred Fremlin	467	3.0	
Total formal votes		15,440	99.3	
Informal votes		103	0.7	
Turnout		5,053	58.8	
		(1 new seat)		

The other sitting member Thomas Williamson did not contest the election.

=== The Richmond ===
1887 New South Wales colonial election: The Richmond Saturday 26 February
Party	Candidate	Votes	%	±%
Protectionist	Thomas Ewing (re-elected 1)	2,153	42.0	
Protectionist	Frederick Crouch (elected 2)	1,950	38.0	
Free Trade	James Barrie	659	12.9	
Free Trade	R Lopez	366	7.1	
Total formal votes		5,128	99.5	
Informal votes		27	0.5	
Turnout		2,828	54.7	

The other sitting member Patrick Hogan did not contest the election.

=== Shoalhaven ===
1887 New South Wales colonial election: Shoalhaven Monday 14 February
Party	Candidate	Votes	%	±%
Free Trade	William Martin (elected)	853	51.7	
Protectionist	William Lovegrove	798	48.3	
Total formal votes		1,651	99.1	
Informal votes		15	0.9	
Turnout		1,666	76.9	

The sitting member Frederick Humphery did not contest the election.

=== South Sydney ===
1887 New South Wales colonial election: South Sydney Saturday 5 February
Party	Candidate	Votes	%	±%
Free Trade	Alban Riley (elected 1)	3,426	20.2	
Free Trade	Bernhard Wise (elected 2)	3,067	18.1	
Free Trade	George Withers (elected 3)	2,845	16.8	
Protectionist	James Toohey (re-elected 4)	1,999	11.8	
Protectionist	John Davies (defeated)	1,394	8.2	
Protectionist	Alfred Miller	1,356	8.0	
Protectionist	Archibald Forsyth (defeated)	1,110	6.5	
Protectionist	Edward Bennett	1,085	6.4	
Independent	Michael Simmons	685	4.0	
Total formal votes		16,967	99.3	
Informal votes		126	0.7	
Turnout		6,602	68.6	

The other sitting member Joseph Olliffe did not contest the election.

=== St Leonards ===
1887 New South Wales colonial election: St Leonards Wednesday 2 February
Party	Candidate	Votes	%	±%
Free Trade	Sir Henry Parkes (re-elected)	unopposed		
Free Trade	Isaac Ives (re-elected)	unopposed		

=== Tamworth ===
1887 New South Wales colonial election: Tamworth Monday 21 February
Party	Candidate	Votes	%	±%
Protectionist	Robert Levien (re-elected 1)	928	28.0	
Protectionist	William Dowel (elected 2)	829	25.0	
Free Trade	William Tribe	784	23.6	
Free Trade	Eustace Pratt	776	23.4	
Total formal votes		3,317	99.0	
Informal votes		32	1.0	
Turnout		1,784	58.2	

The other sitting member Michael Burke did not contest the election.

=== Tenterfield ===
1887 New South Wales colonial election: Tenterfield Monday 21 February
Party	Candidate	Votes	%	±%
Free Trade	Charles Lee (re-elected)	672	65.8	
Protectionist	William Richardson	350	34.3	
Total formal votes		1,022	97.4	
Informal votes		27	2.6	
Turnout		1,049	45.1	

=== Tumut ===
1887 New South Wales colonial election: Tumut Saturday 19 February
Party	Candidate	Votes	%	±%
Protectionist	Travers Jones (re-elected)	662	52.2	
Free Trade	Nathaniel Emanuel	607	47.8	
Total formal votes		1,269	98.0	
Informal votes		26	2.0	
Turnout		1,295	74.3	

=== The Upper Hunter ===
1887 New South Wales colonial election: The Upper Hunter Friday 18 February
Party	Candidate	Votes	%	±%
Free Trade	John McElhone (elected 1)	984	36.7	
Free Trade	Robert FitzGerald (re-elected 2)	599	22.4	
Protectionist	William Abbott	549	20.5	
Free Trade	Thomas Hungerford (defeated)	548	20.5	
Total formal votes		2,680	99.8	
Informal votes		6	0.2	
Turnout		1,637	57.0	

=== Wellington ===
1887 New South Wales colonial election: Wellington Saturday 19 February
Party	Candidate	Votes	%	±%
Protectionist	David Ferguson (re-elected)	547	64.4	
Free Trade	W J Hill	303	35.7	
Total formal votes		850	98.2	
Informal votes		16	1.9	
Turnout		866	64.5	

=== Wentworth ===
1887 New South Wales colonial election: Wentworth Saturday 26 February
Party	Candidate	Votes	%	±%
Protectionist	Joseph Abbott (re-elected 1)	939	34.5	
Ind. Free Trade	William MacGregor (re-elected 2)	779	28.6	
Protectionist	Thomas Browne (defeated)	636	23.4	
Protectionist	William Fergusson (defeated)	369	13.6	
Total formal votes		2,723	98.6	
Informal votes		38	1.4	
Turnout		1,583	29.1	

William MacGregor one of two sitting members for Wentworth. The other sitting member Edward Quin did not contest the election. Joseph Abbott was the member for Gunnedah, Thomas Browne was the member for Mudgee and William Fergusson was the member for Glen Innes.

=== West Macquarie ===
1887 New South Wales colonial election: West Macquarie Thursday 17 February
Party	Candidate	Votes	%	±%
Free Trade	Fergus Smith (elected)	340	48.3	
Protectionist	Paddy Crick	255	36.2	
Protectionist	John Hughes	109	15.5	
Total formal votes		704	98.9	
Informal votes		8	1.1	
Turnout		712	64.2	

The sitting member Lewis Lloyd did not contest the election.

=== West Maitland ===
1887 New South Wales colonial election: West Maitland Wednesday 9 February
Party	Candidate	Votes	%	±%
Free Trade	Richard Thompson (re-elected)	unopposed		

=== West Sydney ===
1887 New South Wales colonial election: West Sydney Saturday 5 February
Party	Candidate	Votes	%	±%
Free Trade	Francis Abigail (re-elected 1)	3,688	19.9	
Free Trade	Alexander Kethel (re-elected 2)	3,450	18.6	
Free Trade	George Merriman (elected 3)	3,049	16.4	
Free Trade	Daniel O'Connor (re-elected 4)	2,988	16.1	
Protectionist	John Young (defeated)	2,246	12.1	
Protectionist	Arthur Nelson	1,212	6.5	
Protectionist	William Westman	977	5.3	
Free Trade	William Pritchard	972	5.2	
Total formal votes		18,582	99.0	
Informal votes		189	1.0	
Turnout		7,429	64.5	

=== Wollombi ===
1887 New South Wales colonial election: Wollombi Saturday 19 February
Party	Candidate	Votes	%	±%
Free Trade	Richard Stevenson (re-elected)	578	55.5	
Free Trade	George Watt	463	44.5	
Total formal votes		1,041	98.4	
Informal votes		17	1.6	
Turnout		1,058	55.3	

=== Yass Plains ===
1887 New South Wales colonial election: Yass Plains Saturday 19 February
Party	Candidate	Votes	%	±%
Protectionist	Thomas Colls (re-elected)	691	56.9	
Free Trade	Henry Donaldson	524	43.1	
Total formal votes		1,215	98.2	
Informal votes		22	1.8	
Turnout		1,247	63.9	

=== Young ===
1887 New South Wales colonial election: Young Saturday 19 February
Party	Candidate	Votes	%	±%
Free Trade	James Gordon (elected 1)	1,095	30.7	
Protectionist	James Mackinnon (re-elected 2)	1,053	29.5	
Protectionist	Gerald Spring (defeated)	922	25.8	
Free Trade	William Lucas	498	14.0	
Total formal votes		3,568	99.3	
Informal votes		24	0.7	
Turnout		2,206	64.4	

== See also ==
- Candidates of the 1887 New South Wales colonial election
- Members of the New South Wales Legislative Assembly, 1887–1889
