= Electoral results for the district of Wentworth =

Election results for Wentworth, New South Wales, Australia

Wentworth, an electoral district of the Legislative Assembly in the Australian state of New South Wales, was created in 1859 and abolished in 1904.

Single-member (1880–1885)
Election	Member	Party		
1880	William Brodribb	None		
1882 by	Edward Quin	None		
1882	Edward Quin	None	Member	Party
1885	Edward Quin	None	William MacGregor	None
1887	(Sir) Joseph Abbott	Protectionist	William MacGregor	Ind. Free Trade
1887 by	(Sir) Joseph Abbott	Protectionist	Thomas Browne	Protectionist
1889	(Sir) Joseph Abbott	Protectionist		
1891	(Sir) Joseph Abbott	Independent		
1894	(Sir) Joseph Abbott	Protectionist		
1895	(Sir) Joseph Abbott	Protectionist		
1898	(Sir) Joseph Abbott	Protectionist		
1901	Robert Scobie	Labor		

== Election results ==
=== Elections in the 1900s ===
==== 1901 ====
1901 New South Wales state election: Wentworth
Party	Candidate	Votes	%	±%
Labour	Robert Scobie	649	63.3	+32.3
Independent	Harry Harben	258	25.2	
Independent	Thomas Boynton	85	8.3	
Independent Liberal	Alexander Cameron	34	3.3	
Total formal votes		1,026	99.1	+0.3
Informal votes		9	0.9	−0.3
Turnout		1,035	60.7	+17.0
Labour gain from Progressive				

The sitting member was Sir Joseph Abbott (Protectionist) who did not contest the election.

=== Elections in the 1890s ===
==== 1898 ====
1898 New South Wales colonial election: Wentworth
Party	Candidate	Votes	%	±%
National Federal	Sir Joseph Abbott	577	69.0	
Labour	Robert Scobie	259	31.0	
Total formal votes		836	98.8	
Informal votes		10	1.2	
Turnout		846	43.7	
National Federal hold				

==== 1895 ====
1895 New South Wales colonial election: Wentworth
Party	Candidate	Votes	%	±%
Protectionist	Sir Joseph Abbott	515	65.9	
Labour	Robert Scobie	266	34.1	
Total formal votes		781	98.9	
Informal votes		9	1.1	
Turnout		790	51.0	
Protectionist hold				

==== 1894 ====
1894 New South Wales colonial election: Wentworth
Party	Candidate	Votes	%	±%
Protectionist	Sir Joseph Abbott	476	55.4	
Labour	Robert Scobie	383	44.6	
Total formal votes		859	97.4	
Informal votes		23	2.6	
Turnout		882	58.5	
Member changed to Protectionist from Independent				

Joseph Abbott had been appointed as Speaker in 1890, was listed as an independent and elected unopposed. While he retained the role of Speaker he was opposed for this election and stood as a Protectionist.

==== 1891 ====
1891 New South Wales colonial election: Wentworth Thursday 18 June
Party	Candidate	Votes	%	±%
Independent	Joseph Abbott (elected)	unopposed		
Member changed to Independent from Protectionist				

Joseph Abbott had been elected as a Protectionist however on his appointment as Speaker in 1890 he was listed as an independent.

=== Elections in the 1880s ===
==== 1889 ====
1889 New South Wales colonial election: Wentworth Thursday 31 January
Party	Candidate	Votes	%	±%
Protectionist	Joseph Abbott (elected)	unopposed		
Protectionist hold				

Wentworth previously returned two members, however it was split, with two new seats, Sturt and Wilcannia. One sitting member for Wentworth Joseph Abbott (Protectionist) was nominated for both Wentworth and East Sydney. The other member for Wentworth was Thomas Browne (Protectionist) who unsuccessfully contested Mudgee.

==== 1887 by-election ====
1887 Wentworth by-election Wednesday 28 September
Party	Candidate	Votes	%	±%
Protectionist	Thomas Browne (elected)	735	52.2	
Free Trade	John Griffin	672	47.8	
Total formal votes		1,407	100	
Informal votes		0	0.00	
Turnout		1,407	25.1	
Protectionist hold				

William MacGregor (Protectionist) resigned.

==== 1887 ====
1887 New South Wales colonial election: Wentworth Saturday 26 February
Party	Candidate	Votes	%	±%
Protectionist	Joseph Abbott (re-elected 1)	939	34.5	
Ind. Free Trade	William MacGregor (re-elected 2)	779	28.6	
Protectionist	Thomas Browne (defeated)	636	23.4	
Protectionist	William Fergusson (defeated)	369	13.6	
Total formal votes		2,723	98.6	
Informal votes		38	1.4	
Turnout		1,583	29.1	

William MacGregor one of two sitting members for Wentworth. The other sitting member Edward Quin did not contest the election. Joseph Abbott was the member for Gunnedah, Thomas Browne was the member for Mudgee and William Fergusson was the member for Glen Innes.

==== 1885 ====
1885 New South Wales colonial election: Wentworth Saturday 31 October
Candidate	Votes	%
Edward Quin (re-elected)	unopposed	
William MacGregor (elected)	unopposed	
	(1 new seat)	

==== 1882 ====
1882 New South Wales colonial election: Wentworth Monday 18 December
Candidate	Votes	%
Edward Quin (re-elected)	511	50.1
Evan Evans	509	49.9
Total formal votes	1,020	97.7
Informal votes	24	2.3
Turnout	1,044	35.1

==== 1882 by-election ====
1882 Wentworth by-election Monday 23 January
Candidate	Votes	%
Edward Quin (elected)	216	50.7
Evan Evans	210	49.3
Total formal votes	426	100.0
Informal votes	0	0.0
Turnout	426	22.4

William Brodribb resigned to accept an appointment to the Legislative Council.

==== 1880 ====
1880 New South Wales colonial election: Wentworth Thursday 2 December
Candidate	Votes	%
William Brodribb (elected)	unopposed	
	(new seat)	
