= Members of the New South Wales Legislative Assembly, 1887–1889 =

Members of the New South Wales Legislative Assembly who served in the 13th parliament of New South Wales held their seats from 1887 to 1889. They were elected at the 1887 colonial election between 4 and 26 February 1887. The Speaker was James Young. This was the first parliament to have recognizable party groups.

Name	Party	Electorate	Term in office
Joseph Abbott ^{[6]}	Free Trade	Newtown	1888–1895
Joseph Palmer Abbott	Protectionist	Wentworth	1880–1901
Francis Abigail	Free Trade	West Sydney	1880–1891
Alfred Allen	Free Trade	Paddington	1887–1894
William Allen ^{[5]}	Protectionist	Paddington	1888–1889
Edward Ball	Free Trade	Argyle	1887–1891
Robert Barbour	Protectionist	Murray	1877–1880, 1882–1894
Reginald Black	Free Trade	Mudgee	1887–1891
John Bowes	Protectionist	Morpeth	1887–1889, 1891–1894
Alexander Bowman	Free Trade	Hawkesbury	1877–1882, 1885–1892
Herbert Brown	Free Trade	Durham	1875–1898
Thomas Browne ^{[2]}	Protectionist	Wentworth	1885–1889
James Brunker	Free Trade	East Maitland	1880–1904
David Buchanan ^{[9]}	Protectionist	Central Cumberland	1860–1862, 1864–1867, 1869–1877, 1879–1885, 1888–1889
Sydney Burdekin	Free Trade	East Sydney	1880–1882, 1884–1891, 1892–1894
John Burns	Free Trade	Hunter	1861–1869, 1872–1891
Angus Cameron	Free Trade	Kiama	1874–1889, 1894–1896
Joseph Carruthers	Free Trade	Canterbury	1887–1908
John Chanter	Protectionist	Murray	1885–1901
Michael Chapman	Free Trade	Glebe	1883–1891
Henry Clarke	Protectionist	Eden	1869–1894, 1895–1904
William Clarke	Free Trade	Orange	1880–1889
Thomas Colls	Protectionist	Yass Plains	1886–1894
Henry Cooke	Free Trade	Forbes	1880–1882, 1887–1891
Henry Copeland	Protectionist	New England	1877–1883, 1883–1895, 1895–1900
William Cortis	Free Trade	Bathurst	1887–1889
Joseph Creer	Ind. Protectionist	Northumberland	1885–1891
Frederick Crouch	Protectionist	Richmond	1887–1889
Thomas Dalton	Protectionist	Orange	1882–1891
Thomas Dangar	Free Trade	Namoi	1865–1885, 1887–1890
William Davis	Free Trade	Canterbury	1887–1889
Henry Dawson	Protectionist	Monaro	1885–1894
George Day	Protectionist	Albury	1874–1889
George Dibbs	Ind. Free Trade	Murrumbidgee	1874–1877, 1882–1895
William Dowel	Protectionist	Tamworth	1887–1894
James Ellis	Free Trade	Newcastle	1882–1885, 1887–1889, 1894–1895
Thomas Ewing	Protectionist	Richmond	1885–1901
Frank Farnell	Free Trade	Central Cumberland	1887–1898, 1901–1903
James Farnell ^{[10]}	Free Trade	Redfern	1860–1860, 1864–1885, 1887–1888
David Ferguson	Protectionist	Wellington	1882–1891
Robert Fitzgerald	Protectionist	Upper Hunter	1885–1901
James Fletcher	Protectionist	Newcastle	1880–1891
William Foster ^{[7]}	Free Trade	Newtown	1880–1882, 1885–1888
John Gale	Protectionist	Murrumbidgee	1887–1889
Charles Garland	Free Trade	Carcoar	1885–1891
Jacob Garrard	Free Trade	Balmain	1880–1898
Thomas Garrett	Free Trade	Camden	1860–1871, 1872–1891
James Garvan	Protectionist	Eden	1880–1894
Frederick Gibbes ^{[6]}	Free Trade	Newtown	1882–1888
Thomas Goodwin ^{[11]}	Protectionist	Gunnedah	1887–1888, 1895–1901
James Gordon	Free Trade	Young	1887–1889
James Gormly	Protectionist	Murrumbidgee	1885–1904
Albert Gould	Free Trade	Patrick's Plains	1882–1898
Thomas Hassall	Protectionist	Gwydir	1886–1901
Nicholas Hawken	Free Trade	Newtown	1887–1891
John Hawthorne ^{[8]}	Free Trade	Balmain	1885–1891, 1894–1904
James Hayes	Protectionist	Hume	1885–1904
John Haynes ^{[1]}	Free Trade	Mudgee	1887–1904, 1915–1917
William Henson	Free Trade	Canterbury	1880–1882, 1885–1889
William Holborow	Free Trade	Argyle	1880–1894
Peter Howe ^{[10]}	Protectionist	Redfern	1888–1891
John Hurley	Free Trade	Hartley	1872–1874, 1876–1880, 1887–1891, 1901–1907
Alexander Hutchison	Free Trade	Canterbury	1887–1891
James Inglis	Free Trade	New England	1885–1894
Isaac Ives	Free Trade	St Leonards	1885–1889
Charles Jeanneret	Free Trade	Carcoar	1887–1889, 1891–1894
Travers Jones	Protectionist	Tumut	1885–1891, 1894–1898
John Kelly	Free Trade	Bogan	1887–1889
Alexander Kethel	Free Trade	West Sydney	1885–1889
Allen Lakeman	Ind. Protectionist	Balranald	1887–1891
Charles Lee	Free Trade	Tenterfield	1884–1920
Samuel Lees	Free Trade	Nepean	1887–1895, 1898–1901
Robert Levien	Protectionist	Tamworth	1880–1889, 1889–1913
William Lyne	Protectionist	Hume	1880–1901
William MacGregor ^{[2]}	Ind. Free Trade	Wentworth	1885–1887
James Mackinnon	Protectionist	Young	1882–1894
William Martin	Free Trade	Shoalhaven	1880–1882, 1887–1889
George Matheson	Free Trade	Glen Innes	1887–1889
William McCourt	Free Trade	Camden	1882–1885, 1887–1913
Andrew McCulloch ^{[4][9]}	Free Trade	Central Cumberland	1877–1888
John McElhone	Free Trade	Upper Hunter	1875–1885, 1887–1889, 1895–1898
John McFarlane	Protectionist	Clarence	1887–1915
William McMillan	Free Trade	East Sydney	1887–1898
Ninian Melville	Protectionist	Northumberland	1880–1887, 1889–1894
George Merriman	Free Trade	West Sydney	1882–1885, 1887–1889
Joseph Mitchell ^{[7]}	Free Trade	Newtown	1881–1882, 1883–1885, 1888–1889, 1889–1891
Samuel Moore	Free Trade	Inverell	1885–1889, 1894–1910
John Neild	Free Trade	Paddington	1885–1889, 1891–1894, 1895–1901
John Nobbs ^{[8]}	Free Trade	Central Cumberland	1888–1993, 1898–1913
Thomas O'Mara	Ind. Protectionist	Monaro	1882–1885, 1887–1889
Daniel O'Connor	Free Trade	West Sydney	1877–1891, 1900–1904
Joseph Olliffe	Protectionist	Queanbeyan	1885–1910
Sir Henry Parkes ^{[3]}	Free Trade	St Leonards	1856, 1858, 1859–1861, 1864–1870, 1872–1895
Varney Parkes ^{[8]}	Free Trade	Central Cumberland	1885–1888, 1891–1900, 1907–1913
Joseph Penzer	Free Trade	Bogan	1887–1889
George Reid	Free Trade	East Sydney	1880–1884, 1885–1901
Alban Riley	Free Trade	South Sydney	1887–1889
Charles Roberts	Free Trade	Hastings and Manning	1882–1890
Andrew Ross	Ind. Protectionist	Molong	1880–1904
Alexander Ryrie	Protectionist	Braidwood	1880–1891
William Schey	Free Trade	Redfern	1887–1898
Jonathan Seaver	Free Trade	Gloucester	1887–1891
John See	Protectionist	Grafton	1880–1904
Thomas Slattery	Protectionist	Boorowa	1880–1885, 1887–1895
Fergus Smith	Free Trade	West Macquarie	1887–1889
Frank Smith	Free Trade	Balmain	1887–1891
Robert Smith	Protectionist	Macleay	1870–1889
Sydney Smith	Free Trade	East Macquarie	1887–1889
William Stephen	Free Trade	Redfern	1887–1891, 1894–1895
Richard Stevenson	Free Trade	Wollombi	1886–1895, 1898–1899
Alfred Stokes	Protectionist	Forbes	1882–1891
John Street	Free Trade	East Sydney	1887–1891
John Sutherland	Free Trade	Redfern	1860–1881, 1882–1889
Adolphus Taylor ^{[1]}	Free Trade	Mudgee	1882–1887, 1890–1891
Hugh Taylor	Free Trade	Parramatta	1882–1894
William Teece	Free Trade	Goulburn	1872–1890
Richard Thompson	Free Trade	West Maitland	1885–1891
James Tonkin	Free Trade	East Macquarie	1887–1895
James Toohey	Protectionist	South Sydney	1885–1891
William Trickett ^{[5]}	Free Trade	Paddington	1880–1887
Edwin Turner ^{[11]}	Free Trade	Gunnedah	1889–1894
Robert Vaughn	Protectionist	Grenfell	1880–1894
Thomas Waddell	Protectionist	Bourke	1887–1917
Thomas Walker	Protectionist	Northumberland	1887–1894
William Wall	Protectionist	Mudgee	1886–1895
Jack Want	Ind. Free Trade	Gundagai	1885–1894
Robert Wilkinson	Free Trade	Balranald	1880–1894
William Wilkinson	Free Trade	Glebe	1885–1889
Alexander Wilson	Free Trade	Bourke	1880–1885, 1887–1889
Bernhard Wise	Free Trade	South Sydney	1887–1889, 1891–1895, 1898–1900
George Withers	Free Trade	South Sydney	1880–1885, 1887–1889
Francis Woodward	Free Trade	Illawarra	1887–1891
James Young	Free Trade	Hastings and Manning	1880–1901, 1904–1907

By-elections

Under the constitution, ministers were required to resign to recontest their seats in a by-election when appointed. These by-elections are only noted when the minister was defeated; in general, he was elected unopposed.

#	Electorate	Departing Member	Party	Reason for By-election	Date of By-election	Winner of By-election	Party
1	Mudgee	Adolphus Taylor	Free Trade	Accepted position as Examiner of Patents	11 May 1887	John Haynes	Free Trade
2	Wentworth	William MacGregor	Independent Free Trade	Resignation	28 September 1887	Thomas Browne	Protectionist
3	St Leonards	Sir Henry Parkes	Free Trade	Financial Difficulty	25 October 1887	Sir Henry Parkes	Free Trade
4	Central Cumberland	Andrew McCulloch	Free Trade	Financial difficulty	28 December 1887	Andrew McCulloch	Free Trade
5	Paddington	William Trickett	Free Trade	Appointed to Legislative Council	12 January 1888	William Allen	Protectionist
6	Newtown	Frederick Gibbes	Protectionist	Death	3 February 1888	Joseph Abbott	Free Trade
7	Newtown	William Foster	Free Trade	Appointed Supreme Court Judge	25 February 1888	Joseph Mitchell	Free Trade
8	Central Cumberland	Varney Parkes	Free Trade	Business Commitments	14 March 1888	John Nobbs	Free Trade
9	Central Cumberland	Andrew McCulloch	Free Trade	Financial Difficulty	15 May 1888	David Buchanan	Protectionist
10	Redfern	James Farnell	Free Trade	Death	8 September 1888	Peter Howe	Protectionist
11	Gunnedah	Thomas Goodwin	Protectionist	Resignation	12 September 1888	Edwin Turner	Free Trade

== See also ==
- Fourth Parkes ministry
- Second Dibbs ministry
- Results of the 1887 New South Wales colonial election
- Candidates of the 1887 New South Wales colonial election
