= Electoral results for the district of Glen Innes =

Election results for Glen Innes, New South Wales, Australia

Glen Innes an electoral district of the Legislative Assembly in the Australian state of New South Wales was created in 1859 and abolished in 1904.

Election	Member	Party		
1880	William Fergusson	None		
1882	William Fergusson	None		
1885	William Fergusson	None		
1887	George Matheson	Free Trade	Member	Party
1889	Francis Wright	Protectionist	Alexander Hutchison	Protectionist
1891	Francis Wright	Protectionist	Alexander Hutchison	Protectionist
1894	Francis Wright	Protectionist		
1895	Francis Wright	Protectionist		
1898	Francis Wright	Protectionist		
1901	Francis Wright	Progressive		
1903 by	Follett Thomas	Liberal Reform		

== Election results ==
=== Elections in the 1900s ===
==== 1903 by-election ====
1903 Glen Innes by-election Wednesday 28 October
Party	Candidate	Votes	%	±%
Liberal Reform	Follett Thomas (elected)	865	58.1	+27.1
Progressive	Alexander Hay	624	41.9	+1.8
Total formal votes		1,489	99.3	+0.5
Informal votes		10	0.7	−0.5
Turnout		1,499	66.6 (Note: Estimate based on a roll of 2,252 at the 1901 election.)	+1.1
Liberal Reform gain from Progressive				

Francis Wright died.

==== 1901 ====
1901 New South Wales state election: Glen Innes
Party	Candidate	Votes	%	±%
Progressive	Francis Wright	584	40.1	−9.3
Independent Liberal	Follet Thomas	452	31.0	
Independent	Thomas Chandler	421	28.9	−14.4
Total formal votes		1,457	98.8	−0.5
Informal votes		18	1.2	+0.5
Turnout		1,475	65.5	+10.3
Progressive hold				

=== Elections in the 1890s ===
==== 1898 ====
1898 New South Wales colonial election: Glen Innes
Party	Candidate	Votes	%	±%
National Federal	Francis Wright	520	49.4	
Independent	Thomas Chandler	455	43.3	
Independent	John Wetherspoon	77	7.3	
Total formal votes		1,052	99.3	
Informal votes		8	0.8	
Turnout		1,060	55.2	
National Federal hold				

==== 1895 ====
1895 New South Wales colonial election: Glen Innes
Party	Candidate	Votes	%	±%
Protectionist	Francis Wright	510	46.8	
Independent Labour	Alexander Hutchison	368	33.8	
Free Trade	John Wetherspoon	211	19.4	
Total formal votes		1,089	99.3	
Informal votes		8	0.7	
Turnout		1,097	62.0	
Protectionist hold				

==== 1894 ====
1894 New South Wales colonial election: Glen Innes
Party	Candidate	Votes	%	±%
Protectionist	Francis Wright	589	44.2	
Protectionist	Alexander Hutchison	508	38.1	
Ind. Protectionist	William Cameron	200	15.0	
Labour	John Souter	37	2.8	
Total formal votes		1,334	98.7	
Informal votes		18	1.3	
Turnout		1,352	77.3	
Protectionist win		(previously 2 members)		

==== 1891 ====
1891 New South Wales colonial election: Glen Innes Saturday 27 June
Party	Candidate	Votes	%	±%
Protectionist	Francis Wright (re-elected 1)	877	33.7	
Protectionist	Alexander Hutchison (re-elected 2)	747	28.7	
Free Trade	George Simpson	506	19.4	
Protectionist	Christopher Legh	474	18.2	
Total formal votes		2,604	98.8	
Informal votes		31	1.2	
Turnout		1,593	59.0	
Protectionist hold 2				

=== Elections in the 1880s ===
==== 1889 ====
1889 New South Wales colonial election: Glen Innes Saturday 16 February
Party	Candidate	Votes	%	±%
Protectionist	Francis Wright (elected 1)	671	31.2	
Protectionist	Alexander Hutchison (elected 2)	578	26.9	
Protectionist	William Fergusson	478	22.2	
Free Trade	Walter Vivian	423	19.7	
Total formal votes		2,150	99.1	
Informal votes		19	0.9	
Turnout		1,375	59.8	
Protectionist win 1 and gain 1 from Free Trade		(1 new seat)		

The sitting member George Matheson (Free Trade) did not contest the election.

==== 1887 ====
1887 New South Wales colonial election: Glen Innes Saturday 19 February
Party	Candidate	Votes	%	±%
Free Trade	George Matheson (elected)	604	51.6	
Protectionist	Alexander Hutchison	567	48.4	
Total formal votes		1,171	98.3	
Informal votes		20	1.7	
Turnout		1,191	42.1	

The sitting member William Fergusson unsuccessfully contested Wentworth.

==== 1885 ====
1885 New South Wales colonial election: Glen Innes Monday 19 October
Candidate	Votes	%
William Fergusson (re-elected)	574	55.3
Alexander Hutchison	398	38.3
W Pomeroy	66	6.4
Total formal votes	1,038	97.7
Informal votes	25	2.4
Turnout	1,061	43.7

==== 1882 ====
1882 New South Wales colonial election: Glen Innes Wednesday 20 December
Candidate	Votes	%
William Fergusson (re-elected)	unopposed	

==== 1880 ====
1880 New South Wales colonial election: Glen Innes Wednesday 24 November
Candidate	Votes	%
William Fergusson (elected)	514	54.3
Edward Bennett	432	45.7
Total formal votes	946	98.3
Informal votes	16	1.7
Turnout	972	61.7
	(new seat)	

Glen Innes was created from the northern part of New England.
