= Electoral results for the district of Eden =

Election results for Eden, New South Wales, Australia

Eden, an electoral district of the Legislative Assembly in the Australian state of New South Wales was created in 1859 and abolished in 1894.

Election	Member	Party		
1859	Daniel Egan	None		
1860	Daniel Egan	None		
1864-65	Daniel Egan	None		
1869-70	Henry Clarke	None		
1872	Henry Clarke	None		
1874-75	Henry Clarke	None		
1877	Henry Clarke	None	Member	Party
1880	Henry Clarke	None	James Garvan	None
1882	Henry Clarke	None	James Garvan	None
1885	Henry Clarke	None	James Garvan	None
1887	Henry Clarke	Protectionist	James Garvan	Protectionist
1889	Henry Clarke	Protectionist	James Garvan	Protectionist
1891	Henry Clarke	Protectionist	James Garvan	Protectionist

== Election results ==
=== Elections in the 1890s ===
==== 1891 ====
1891 New South Wales colonial election: Eden Wednesday 24 June
Party	Candidate	Votes	%	±%
Protectionist	Henry Clarke (elected 1)	1,079	30.3	
Protectionist	James Garvan (elected 2)	1,021	28.7	
Free Trade	William Neilley	603	17.0	
Ind. Protectionist	William Boot	510	14.3	
Ind. Protectionist	Richard Crabb	344	9.7	
Total formal votes		3,557	97.5	
Informal votes		90	2.5	
Turnout		2,690	72.4	
Protectionist hold 2				

=== Elections in the 1880s ===
==== 1889 ====
1889 New South Wales colonial election: Eden Saturday 2 February
Party	Candidate	Votes	%	±%
Protectionist	Henry Clarke (elected 1)	1,647	45.1	
Protectionist	James Garvan (elected 2)	1,457	39.9	
Free Trade	Nicholas Downing	545	14.9	
Total formal votes		3,649	99.4	
Informal votes		22	0.6	
Turnout		2,041	58.0	
Protectionist hold 2				

==== 1887 ====
1887 New South Wales colonial election: Eden Friday 11 February
Party	Candidate	Votes	%	±%
Protectionist	Henry Clarke (re-elected)	unopposed		
Protectionist	James Garvan (re-elected)	unopposed		

==== 1885 ====
1885 New South Wales colonial election: Eden Thursday 29 October
Candidate	Votes	%
James Garvan (re-elected 1)	1,385	40.5
Henry Clarke (re-elected 2)	1,253	36.6
Henry Walker	785	22.9
Total formal votes	3,423	99.2
Informal votes	29	0.8
Turnout	2,156	68.7

==== 1882 ====
1882 New South Wales colonial election: Eden Monday 11 December
Candidate	Votes	%
James Garvan (re-elected 2)	unopposed	
Henry Clarke (re-elected 1)	unopposed	
Total formal votes	15,071	99.7
Informal votes	53	0.4
Turnout	4,719	58.7

==== 1880 ====
1880 New South Wales colonial election: Eden Friday 26 November
Candidate	Votes	%
Henry Clarke (re-elected 1)	1,099	40.5
James Garvan (elected 2)	899	33.1
W Manning	375	13.8
Alexander Hutchison	344	12.7
Total formal votes	2,717	99.2
Informal votes	22	0.8
Turnout	2,739	53.5
	(1 new seat)	

=== Elections in the 1870s ===
==== 1877 ====
1877 New South Wales colonial election: Eden Tuesday 30 October
Candidate	Votes	%
Henry Clarke (re-elected)	825	69.6
Sir Henry Parkes	361	30.4
Total formal votes	1,186	100.0
Informal votes	0	0.0
Turnout	1,216	54.5

==== 1874-75 ====
1874–75 New South Wales colonial election: Eden Monday 28 December 1874
Candidate	Votes	%
Henry Clarke (re-elected)	667	74.4
William Clements	230	25.6
Total formal votes	897	100.0
Informal votes	0	0.0
Turnout	897	48.0

==== 1872 ====
1872 New South Wales colonial election: Eden Monday 26 February
Candidate	Votes	%
Henry Clarke (re-elected)	760	61.6
John D'Arcy	470	38.1
William Clements	4	0.3
Total formal votes	1,234	100.0
Informal votes	0	0.0
Turnout	1,262	67.0

=== Elections in the 1860s ===
==== 1869-70 ====
1869–70 New South Wales colonial election: Eden Tuesday 14 December 1869
Candidate	Votes	%
Henry Clarke (elected)	590	50.5
Daniel Egan (defeated)	578	49.5
Total formal votes	1,168	100.0
Informal votes	0	0.0
Turnout	1,168	72.9

==== 1864-65 ====
1864–65 New South Wales colonial election: Eden Saturday 24 December 1864
Candidate	Votes	%
Daniel Egan (re-elected)	unopposed	

==== 1860 ====
1860 New South Wales colonial election: Eden Monday 10 December
Candidate	Votes	%
Daniel Egan (re-elected)	unopposed	

=== Elections in the 1850s ===
==== 1859 ====
1859 New South Wales colonial election: Eden Thursday 23 June
Candidate	Votes	%
Daniel Egan (elected)	337	55.6
Henry Clarke	269	44.4
Total formal votes	606	100.0
Informal votes	0	0.0
Turnout	605	78.7

Daniel Egan was defeated as the sitting member for Monara.
