= Electoral results for the district of Gough =

Election results for Gough, New South Wales, Australia

Gough, an electoral district of the Legislative Assembly in the Australian state of New South Wales was created in 1904 and abolished in 1920.

Election	Member	Party
1904	Follett Thomas	Liberal Reform
1907	Follett Thomas	Liberal Reform
1910	Follett Thomas	Liberal Reform
1913	Follett Thomas	Liberal Reform
1917	Follett Thomas	Nationalist

== Election results ==
=== Elections in the 1910s ===
==== 1917 ====
1917 New South Wales state election: Gough
Party	Candidate	Votes	%	±%
Nationalist	Follet Thomas	3,633	52.1	0.0
Labor	Lou Cunningham	3,337	47.9	0.0
Total formal votes		6,970	98.5	+1.0
Informal votes		105	1.5	−1.0
Turnout		7,075	65.6	−12.9
Nationalist hold		Swing	0.0	

==== 1913 ====
1913 New South Wales state election: Gough
Party	Candidate	Votes	%	±%
Farmers and Settlers	Follett Thomas (Note: Also endorsed by Liberal Reform.)	4,227	52.1	
Labor	Henry Colditz	3,878	47.9	
Total formal votes		8,105	97.5	
Informal votes		207	2.5	
Turnout		8,312	78.5	
Member changed to Farmers and Settlers from Liberal Reform				

==== 1910 ====
1910 New South Wales state election: Gough
Party	Candidate	Votes	%	±%
Liberal Reform	Follett Thomas	3,485	50.8	
Labour	Henry Colditz	3,381	49.2	
Total formal votes		6,866	98.5	
Informal votes		106	1.5	
Turnout		6,972	73.9	
Liberal Reform hold				

=== Elections in the 1900s ===
==== 1907 ====
1907 New South Wales state election: Gough
Party	Candidate	Votes	%	±%
Liberal Reform	Follett Thomas	2,982	55.6	
Labour	Francis Bryant	2,166	40.4	
Independent	William Vincent	217	4.0	
Total formal votes		5,365	96.4	
Informal votes		203	3.7	
Turnout		5,568	67.2	
Liberal Reform hold				

==== 1904 ====
1904 New South Wales state election: Gough
Party	Candidate	Votes	%	±%
Liberal Reform	Follet Thomas	2,234	50.9	
Labour	Frank Foster	1,799	41.0	
Progressive	John MacDonald	228	5.2	
Independent	Thomas Jones	130	3.0	
Total formal votes		4,391	98.3	
Informal votes		74	1.7	
Turnout		4,465	62.4	
Liberal Reform win		(new seat)		

Gough was a new seat that comprised the abolished seat of Glenn Innes and part of Inverell. The member for Glen Innes was Follet Thomas (Labour). The member for Inverell was George Jones (Labour) who successfully contested The Gwydir.
