= 1882 Wentworth colonial by-election =

By-election in New South Wales, Australia

A by-election was held for the New South Wales Legislative Assembly electorate of Wentworth on 23 January 1882 because of the resignation of William Brodribb to accept an appointment to the Legislative Council.

== Dates ==
Date	Event
29 December 1881	William Brodribb resigned, and summoned to the Legislative Council.
29 December 1881	Writ of election issued by the Speaker of the Legislative Assembly.
13 January 1882	Nominations
23 January 1882	Polling day
6 February 1882	Return of writ

== Result ==
1882 Wentworth by-election Monday 23 January
Candidate	Votes	%
Edward Quin (elected)	216	50.7
Evan Evans	210	49.3
Total formal votes	426	100.0
Informal votes	0	0.0
Turnout	426	22.4

== See also ==
- Electoral results for the district of Wentworth
- List of New South Wales state by-elections
