= Wentworth by-election =

Wentworth by-election may refer to:

- 1882 Wentworth colonial by-election, for the New South Wales Legislative Assembly electorate of Wentworth
- 1887 Wentworth colonial by-election, for the New South Wales Legislative Assembly electorate of Wentworth
- 1933 Wentworth by-election, for the United Kingdom Parliament constituency of Wentworth
- 1956 Wentworth by-election, for the Australian House of Representatives seat of Wentworth
- 1981 Wentworth by-election, for the Australian House of Representatives seat of Wentworth
- 1995 Wentworth by-election, for the Australian House of Representatives seat of Wentworth
- 2018 Wentworth by-election, for the Australian House of Representatives seat of Wentworth
