= 1903 Glen Innes state by-election =

By-election in New South Wales, Australia

- 4 November 1903

Electoral district of Boorowa in the Legislative Assembly of New South Wales
- Turnout: 66.6 % (▲1.1%)
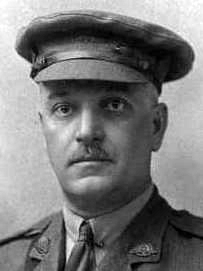
	First party	Second party
	LRP
Candidate	Follett Thomas	Alexander Hay
Party	Liberal Reform	Progressive
Popular vote	865	624
Percentage	58.1%	41.9%
MLA before election
Francis Augustus Wright
Progressive
Elected MLA
Follett Thomas
Liberal Reform

A by-election was held for the New South Wales Legislative Assembly electorate of Glen Innes on 4 November 1903 because of the death of Francis Wright.

== Dates ==
Date	Event
1 October 1903	Francis Wright died.
7 October 1903	Writ of election issued by the Speaker of the Legislative Assembly.
16 October 1903	Nominations
28 October 1903	Polling day
11 November 1903	Return of writ

== Result ==
1903 Glen Innes by-election Wednesday 28 October
Party	Candidate	Votes	%	±%
Liberal Reform	Follett Thomas (elected)	865	58.1	+27.1
Progressive	Alexander Hay	624	41.9	+1.8
Total formal votes		1,489	99.3	+0.5
Informal votes		10	0.7	−0.5
Turnout		1,499	66.6 (Note: Estimate based on a roll of 2,252 at the 1901 election.)	+1.1
Liberal Reform gain from Progressive				

== See also ==
- Electoral results for the district of Glen Innes
- List of New South Wales state by-elections
