= 1887 Wentworth colonial by-election =

By-election in New South Wales, Australia

A by-election was held for the New South Wales Legislative Assembly electorate of Wentworth on 28 September 1887 because of the resignation of William MacGregor (Protectionist).

== Dates ==
Date	Event
5 September 1887	William MacGregor resigned.
8 September 1887	Writ of election issued by the Speaker of the Legislative Assembly.
22 September 1887	Nominations
28 September 1887	Polling day
11 October 1887	Return of writ

== Result ==
1887 Wentworth by-election Wednesday 28 September
Party	Candidate	Votes	%	±%
Protectionist	Thomas Browne (elected)	735	52.2	
Free Trade	John Griffin	672	47.8	
Total formal votes		1,407	100	
Informal votes		0	0.00	
Turnout		1,407	25.1	
Protectionist hold				

== See also ==
- Electoral results for the district of Wentworth
- List of New South Wales state by-elections
