= Tarella Quin =

Australian children's author and novelist (1877–1945)

- Born: 1877 near Wilcannia, New South Wales
- Died: 22 October 1945 (aged 67–68)
- Occupation: Author
- Writing career
- Pen name: Tarella Daskein; James Dare; James Adare; Tarella Quin Daskein
- Genres: Children's literature, fiction
- Notable works: Gum Tree Brownie and Other Faerie Folk of the Never Never

Tarella Quin (1877 – 22 October 1945), was an Australian children's author, novelist and short story writer. Known as Ella, she wrote under various names, including Tarella Quin, Tarella Daskein, James Dare, James Adare and Tarella Quin Daskein.

Tarella Quin, daughter of Edith Quin (née Dollman) and pastoralist and politician Edward Quin, was born in 1877 on a property near Wilcannia, New South Wales. She was educated in Adelaide at Miss Thornber's school in Unley Park.

Several of her books were illustrated by Ida Rentoul Outhwaite.

== Works ==
- Gum Tree Brownie and Other Faerie Folk of the Never Never, 1907
- Freckles, 1910
- Before the Lamps are Lit, 1911
- A Desert Rose, 1912
- Kerno: A Stone, 1914
- Paying Guests, 1917
- The Other Side of Nowhere, 1934
- Chimney Town, 1934
