= Gulgong Guardian =

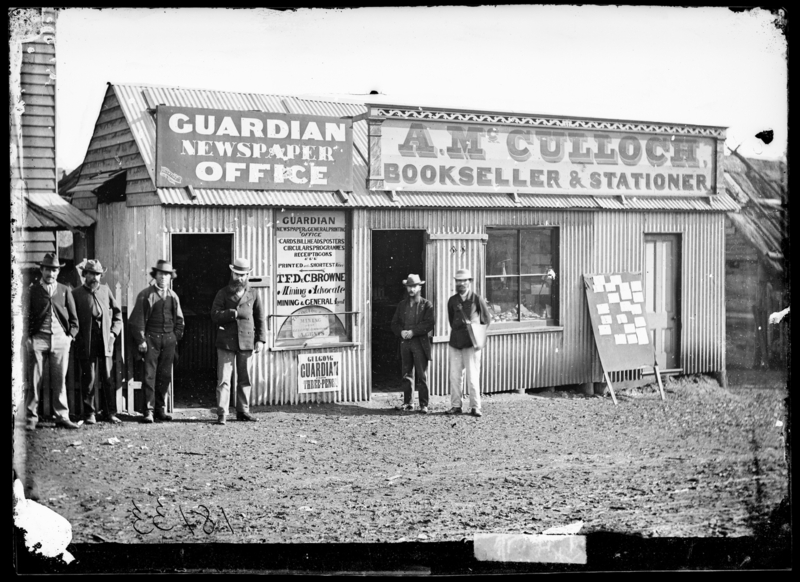
Thomas Frederick De Courcy Browne's Guardian Newspaper Office

The Gulgong Guardian (in full the Gulgong Guardian and District Mining Record) was an English language newspaper published in Gulgong, New South Wales, Australia from 1871 to 1873.

== History ==
The newspaper was first published on 18 February 1871 by Thomas Frederic De Courcy Browne. The Illustrated Sydney News and New South Wales Agriculturalist and Grazier wrote that the Guardian "ably advocated the cause of mining reform."

It published its final issue on 5 July 1873. Sydney newspaper The Evening News reported that the Gulgong Guardian had "ceased to exist" on 19 July 1873, with its plant bought by competitor the Gulgong Argus.

In the week before the newspaper ceased publishing, editor Browne, who had only just been released from one month's imprisonment for libel, had been placed on trial for embezzlement in relation to a company of which he had been secretary. The Albury Banner and Wodonga Express claimed that Browne was "believed to be the victim of malicious prosecution".

== See also ==
- List of newspapers in Australia
- List of newspapers in New South Wales
