= John Osborne (journalist) =

John Osborne (25 September 1842 – 1 September 1908) was an Australian journalist and Methodist minister.

He was born at Wollongong to builder Robert Osborne and Rebecca Musgrave. He became a solicitor's clerk before joining the Wesleyan ministry. On 9 April 1867 he married Elizabeth Wastell, and they soon both departed to Samoa as missionaries. He was sent to Fiji in 1869 and Rotuma in 1870, before his wife's health forced him to return to New South Wales. He was a minister at Adelong, Yass, Newtown and Newcastle before his appointment to York Street, the colony's leading Methodist church, in 1883.

Osborne's liberal approach to religion and lack of sectarianism achieved the desired effect of increasing church attendance, but it also alienated conservatives. He was charged with heresy after praising Roger Vaughan, the Catholic Archbishop of Sydney; acquitted of the charge, he was nevertheless urged to restrain his preachings. Osborne did not follow this directive, and instead attended the Requiem Mass for Vaughan and supported George Higinbotham and the Australian Church radical Charles Strong. He pre-empted his removal by resigning from the ministry and the church in January 1884.

Osborne then became a journalist, working for the Daily Telegraph and also running the non-sectarian Christian Platform, which ran until 1885. By 1886 he was a declared secularist, and had also abandoned his original support for free trade in favour of protectionism. He contested a by-election for the Legislative Assembly seat of Argyle in 1885 as a supporter of Alexander Stuart, and was only narrowly defeated by Sir Henry Parkes. He ran for office twice more, for Northumberland in 1887 and for Goulburn in 1889, without success. He joined the staff of the Sydney Morning Herald in 1886 but by 1889 was working for the protectionist Australian Star, becoming its editor the following year. In 1899 he became secretary of the Public Service Association of NSW. Osborne died after a heart attack at Double Bay in 1908.
