= George Higinbotham =

Australian politician

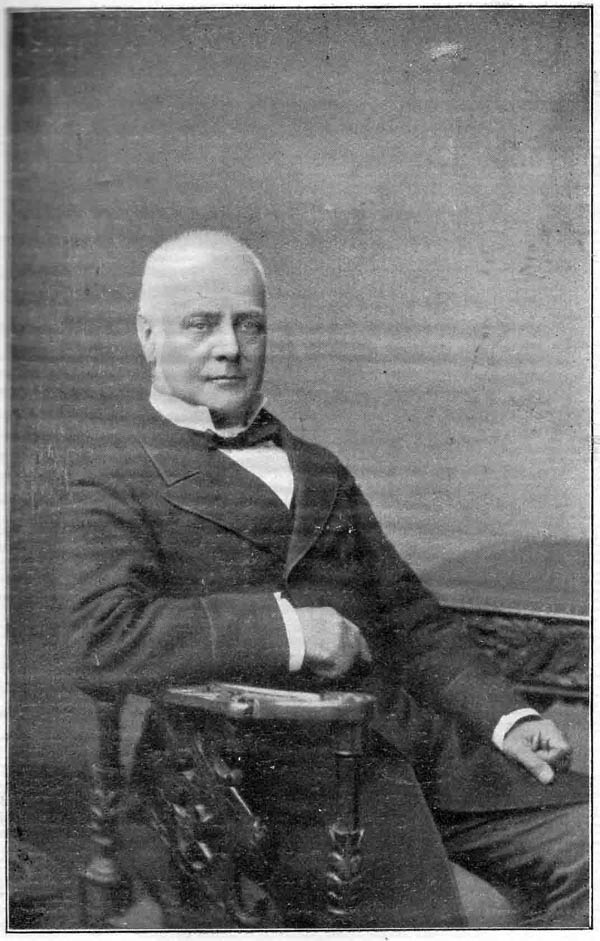

Chief Justice of the Supreme Court of Victoria
- In office 24 September 1886 – 31 December 1892
- Preceded by: William Stawell
- Succeeded by: John Madden

Personal details
- Born: 19 April 1826 Dublin, Ireland
- Died: 31 December 1892 (aged 66) South Yarra, Melbourne
- Resting place: Brighton, Victoria
- Education: Trinity College, Dublin

George Higinbotham (19 April 1826 – 31 December 1892) was a politician and Chief Justice of the Supreme Court of Victoria, which is the highest ranking court in the Australian colony, later state, of Victoria.

== Early life ==
George Higinbotham was the sixth son (and youngest of eight) of Henry Higinbotham, a merchant in Dublin, and Sarah Wilson, daughter of Joseph Wilson.

Higinbotham qualified for the degree of Bachelor of Arts in 1849 and Master of Arts in 1853.

== Move to Australia ==
On 1 December 1853 Higinbotham left Liverpool for Australia on the Briseis and arrived in Melbourne on 10 March 1854, where he contributed to the Melbourne Herald and practised at the bar with much success. In 1857 he became editor of the Melbourne Argus, but resigned in 1859 and returned to the bar. He was elected to the Victorian Legislative Assembly in May 1861 for Brighton as an independent Liberal, was rejected at the general election of July the same year, but was returned nine months later.

== Attorney-General ==
In June 1863, Higinbotham became attorney-general in the Sir James McCulloch government. Under his influence measures were passed through the legislative assembly of a somewhat extreme character, completely ignoring the rights of the Victorian Legislative Council, and the government was carried on without any Appropriation Act for more than a year. Higinbotham, by his eloquence and earnestness, obtained great influence amongst the members of the legislative assembly, but his colleagues were not prepared to follow him as far as he desired to go.

Higinbotham contended that in a constitutional colony like Victoria the secretary of state for the colonies had no right to fetter the discretion of the queen's representative.

Higinbotham did not return to power with his chief, Sir James McCulloch, after the defeat of the short-lived Sladen administration; and being defeated for Brighton at the next general election by a comparatively unknown man, Sir Thomas Bent, he devoted himself to his practice at the bar.

Among his other labours as attorney-general, Higinbotham had codified all the statutes which were in force throughout the colony. In May 1873 he was returned to the legislative assembly for East Bourke Boroughs, resigning in January 1876.

== Judge ==
In 1880 Higinbotham was appointed a puisne judge of the Supreme Court, and in 1886, on the retirement of Sir William Stawell, he was promoted to the office of chief justice. Higinbotham was appointed president of the International Exhibition held in Melbourne in 1888–1889, but did not take any active part in its management. One of his latest public acts was to subscribe a sum of £10, 10s. a week towards the funds of the strikers in the great Australian labour dispute of 1890, an act which did not meet with general approval.

== Women's rights ==
Higinbotham was a champion for women's rights from the beginning of his parliamentary career, when he proposed the Married Women's Property Bill and was posthumously lauded by the Women's Political Association of Victoria, for proposing women's suffrage in 1869.

He is mentioned as an exception to typical men of the nineteenth century as a "legislator of unusual wisdom for that era" in Henrietta Dugdale's utopian novel "A Few Hours In A Far Off Age".

== Death ==
Higinbotham died at South Yarra, Melbourne, on 31 December 1892, and was survived by his wife, two sons and three daughters. He had a private funeral at his own request.

== Commemoration ==
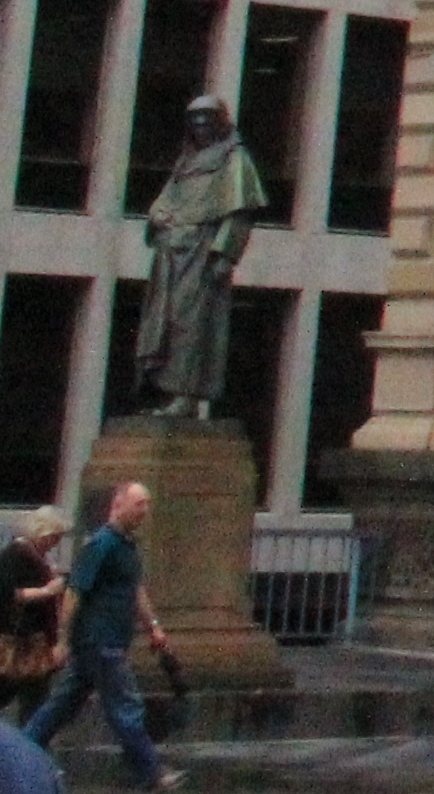
Statue of Higinbotham outside the Old Treasury Building, Melbourne

There is a bronze statue to him outside the Old Treasury Building, Melbourne. Furthermore, the former division of Higinbotham was named for him.

== See also ==
- Judiciary of Australia
- List of Judges of the Supreme Court of Victoria

== Sources ==
- Gwyneth M. Dow, 'Higinbotham, George (1826 - 1892)', Australian Dictionary of Biography, Volume 4, Melbourne University Press, 1972, pp 391–397. Retrieved on 26 April 2009
- Serle, Percival (1949). "Higinbotham, George". Dictionary of Australian Biography. Sydney: Angus & Robertson.

Victorian Legislative Assembly
Preceded by Charles Ebden	Member for Brighton; May 1861 – July 1861	Succeeded by William Brodribb
Preceded by William Brodribb	Member for Brighton; April 1862 – January 1871	Succeeded by Thomas Bent
Preceded by William Champ	Member for East Bourke Boroughs; May 1873 – January 1876	Succeeded by William Cook
Political offices
Preceded by Richard Davies Ireland	Attorney-General of Victoria; 27 June 1863 – 5 May 1868	Succeeded by Morgan McDonnell
Legal offices
Preceded by William Stawell	Chief Justice of the Supreme Court of Victoria; 24 September 1886 – 31 December 1892	Succeeded by John Madden
