= Electoral district of Gough =

Former state electoral district of New South Wales, Australia

Gough was an electoral district of the Legislative Assembly in the Australian state of New South Wales, named after the Gough County, which includes the town of Glen Innes. It was created in the 1904 re-distribution of electorates following the 1903 New South Wales referendum, which required the number of members of the Legislative Assembly to be reduced from 125 to 90. It consisted of the abolished seat of Glenn Innes and part of Inverell.

In 1920, with the introduction of proportional representation, it was absorbed into Northern Tablelands, along with Armidale and Tenterfield.

== Members for Gough ==
Member	Party	Term
Follett Thomas	Liberal Reform	1904–1917
Follett Thomas	Nationalist	1917–1920

== Election results ==
1917 New South Wales state election: Gough
Party	Candidate	Votes	%	±%
Nationalist	Follet Thomas	3,633	52.1	0.0
Labor	Lou Cunningham	3,337	47.9	0.0
Total formal votes		6,970	98.5	+1.0
Informal votes		105	1.5	−1.0
Turnout		7,075	65.6	−12.9
Nationalist hold		Swing	0.0	
