= Robert Scobie (Australian politician, born 1848) =

Australian politician

Robert Scobie (1848 – 15 August 1917) was an Australian politician, elected as a member of the New South Wales Legislative Assembly.

He was born in Glasgow to Robert Scobie and Margaret Orr. On 24 December 1872 he married Elizabeth Farris, with whom he had nine children. Scobie and his young family left Scotland for Bombay where he managed a saddlery and leather business. They arrived in New South Wales around 1878 and settled in Menindee, where he opened a saddlery business.

Scobie was a Labor Party candidate for Wentworth but was unsuccessful in 1894, 1895, and 1898, before winning the seat in 1901. Wentworth was abolished in the 1904 redistribution and replaced by Murray, which Scobie won in 1904, and held until his death in 1917. He was a supporter of conscription and supported Billy Hughes in the subsequent 1916 Australian Labor Party split, during which he joined the Nationalist Party, for which he was re-elected at the 1917 election.

Scobie died at Bellevue Hill on 15 August 1917 (aged 68–69).

== Notes ==
New South Wales Legislative Assembly
Preceded by Sir Joseph Abbott	Member for Wentworth; 1901–1904	Abolished
Preceded by James Hayes	Member for Murray; 1904–1917	Succeeded by Brian Doe
