= William Adams Brodribb =

Australian politician

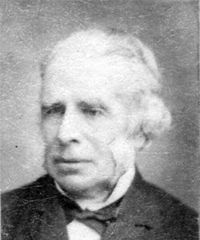
- Born: 27 May 1809; London, England
- Died: 31 May 1886 (aged 77); Sydney, NSW, Australia
- Occupations: pastoralist, politician

William Adams Brodribb (27 May 1809 – 31 May 1886) was an Australian pastoralist and politician.

He was born in London on 27 May 1809. His father, also William Adams Brodribb, was an attorney who was convicted of administering unlawful oaths in 1816 and transported for seven years. He arrived at Sydney in Sir William Bensley in March 1817, and was sent to Hobart. In February 1818 his wife and children arrived at Hobart in Duke of Wellington. They settled on a farm near New Norfolk and three more sons were born.

In April 1835 William junior moved to New South Wales and became a partner in a cattle station. In 1836 he overlanded the second draft of cattle to Melbourne. On returning from Port Phillip Brodribb relocated to what later became the site of Gundagai. In August Brodribb petitioned for a punt over the Murrumbidgee near his Gundagai hut and in January 1838 Deputy Surveyor General Samuel Perry reported that 'a better site could not have been chosen for a Town of the first class' in reference to Gundagai. In 1841, following Strzelecki, he formed an expedition to Gippsland which named Port Albert, the Latrobe River, the Albert River and explored inland.

In 1843 he became manager of the Monaro runs of William Bradley. For the next twelve years he lived on Coolringdon station near Cooma. In 1855 he settled on the Wanganella run, near Deniliquin. He owned a series of properties in western New South Wales until retiring to Sydney in 1879.

At the 1859 election he was a candidate for the seat Balranald in the New South Wales Legislative Assembly, but was unsuccessful. In July 1861 Brodribb won the seat of Brighton in the Victorian Legislative Assembly, but resigned the following year. His brother Kenric was also a member of the Victorian Legislative Assembly, representing St Kilda from 1861 to 1864. He made a further attempt for a seat in the NSW Legislative Assembly at the 1864-65 election for Monara, but was unsuccessful.

He was elected to the New South Wales Legislative Assembly at the November 1880 election for the seat of Wentworth, but he served for barely a year before he resigned to accept appointment to the Legislative Council in December 1881, where he remained until his death.

Brodribb published an autobiography in 1883.

He died in Sydney on 31 May 1886 (aged 77) and was buried with his family in St Andrew's Graveyard, Brighton, Victoria.

== Etymology ==
The Brodribb River in East Gippsland is named after him.

Victorian Legislative Assembly
Preceded by George Higinbotham	Member for Brighton; 1861–1862	Succeeded by George Higinbotham
New South Wales Legislative Assembly
New seat	Member for Wentworth; 1880–1881	Succeeded by Edward Quin
