= Francis Augustus Wright =

Australian politician (1835–1903)

The Honourable Francis Augustus Wright JP
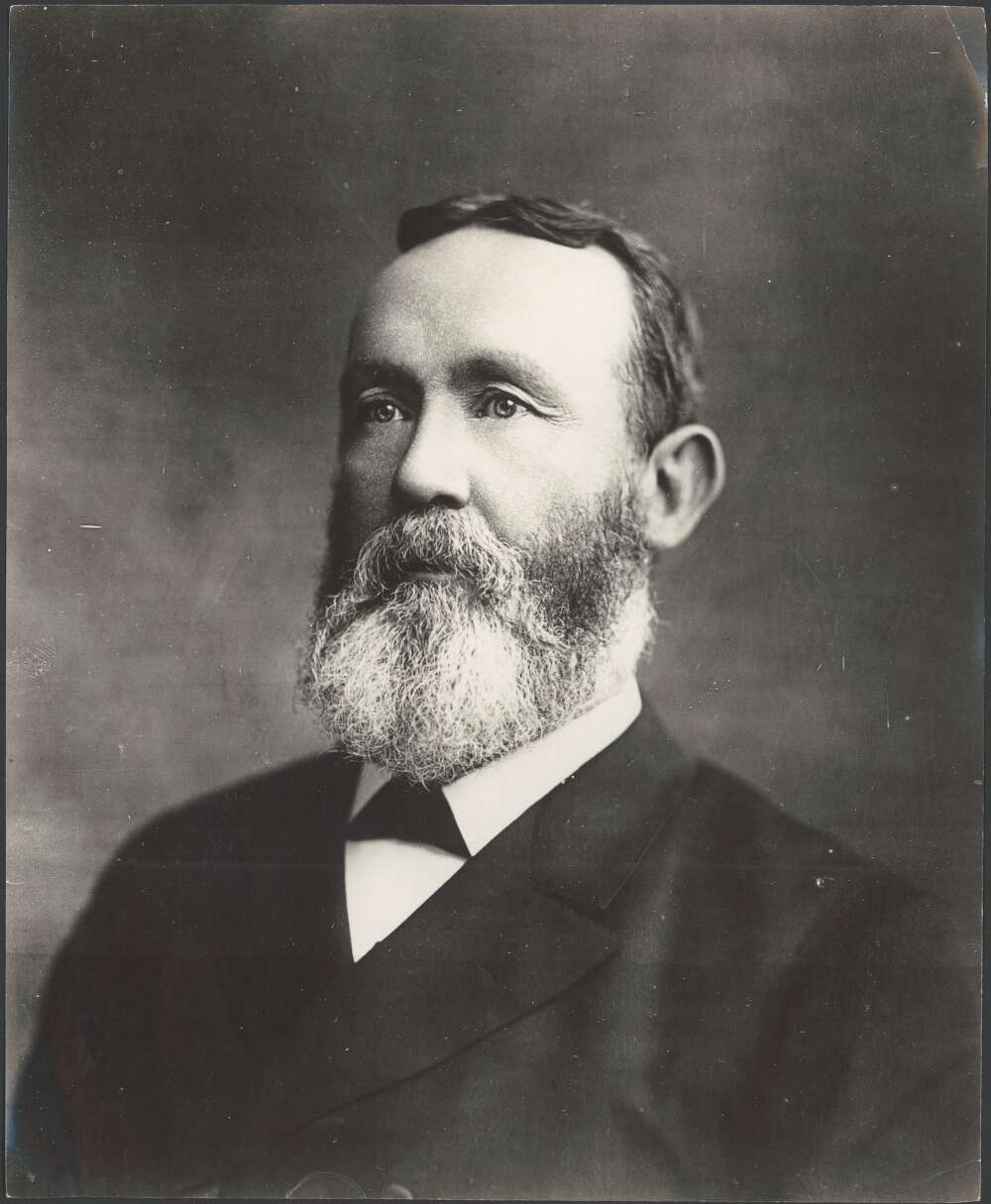
- Wright circa 1895

Secretary for Public Works
- In office 28 May 1883 – 6 October 1885
- Premier: Sir Alexander Stuart
- Preceded by: Henry Copeland
- Succeeded by: Henry Badgery

Mayor of Redfern
- In office February 1882 – February 1885
- Preceded by: Patrick Stanley
- Succeeded by: George Lander

Alderman on the Redfern Municipal Council
- In office February 1873 – 2 September 1886
- Succeeded by: John Beveridge
- Constituency: Belmore Ward

Personal details
- Born: 1 August 1835 London, England, UK
- Died: 1 October 1903 (aged 68) Ryde, New South Wales, Australia

Military service
- Allegiance: United Kingdom; Australia
- Branch/service: (New South Wales) NSW Colonial Forces
- Years of service: 1873 – 1902
- Rank: Lieutenant Colonel
- Unit: Sydney Bn. Volunteer Rifles

Francis Augustus Wright (1 August 1835 – 1 October 1903) was a merchant sailor, gold miner, carrier and member of the Parliament of New South Wales.

== Early life ==
Wright was born in London, England to Eliza née Lunn. His father, also named Frances Augustus Wright, was a Captain of the Royal Navy, and the family emigrated to New South Wales in 1836. Wright went to sea as an apprentice, returning to Australia in 1852 and working in the gold fields of Victoria and New South Wales for three years. He married Alice Marcia Williams on 19 December 1864.

== Politics ==
In 1873 Wright was elected as an alderman for the Municipality of Redfern, serving until 1887, including a period as He became Mayor of Redfern from February 1882 until February 1885. At a by-election in 1882 he was elected as a member for Redfern in the New South Wales Legislative Assembly, He was a friend of Henry Copeland and both were appointed ministers in the Stuart ministry from January 1883, with Wright being allocated the portfolio of Postmaster-General. Copeland was forced to resign two months later and in May 1883 Wright was allocated Copeland's former portfolio of Secretary for Public Works, holding it until October 1885, when he joined the Dibbs ministry, and held office as Secretary for Mines until his defeat for Redfern in October 1885.

Both Wright and Copeland were committed free traders, however both altered their positions, becoming members of the Protectionist Party. Wright returned to politics as a Protectionist candidate for Glen Innes, winning the seat at the 1889 election, and retaining it until his death.

He was a commissioner for New South Wales for the international exhibitions in London in 1886 and Chicago in 1893.

Wright died in Ryde, Sydney on 1 October 1903 (aged 68). Alice and he had 5 daughters and 5 sons and he was survived by Alice, 3 daughters and 2 sons.

== See also ==
- Members of the New South Wales Legislative Assembly
- 1880–1882
- 1882–1885
- 1889–1891
- 1891–1894
- 1894–1895
- 1895–1898
- 1898–1901
- 1901–1904
- Results of New South Wales state elections
- 1882 (Redfern)
- 1885 (Redfern)
- 1889 (Glen Innes)
- 1891 (Glen Innes)
- 1894 (Glen Innes)
- 1895 (Glen Innes)
- 1898 (Glen Innes)
- 1901 (Glen Innes)

Parliament of New South Wales
Political offices
Preceded by Alexander Campbell	Postmaster-General of New South Wales; 1883	Succeeded by William Trickett
Preceded by Henry Copeland	Secretary for Public Works; 1883 – 1885	Succeeded by Henry Badgery
Preceded by Joseph Abbott	Secretary for Mines; 1885	Succeeded by George Thornton
New South Wales Legislative Assembly
Preceded by John Sutherland; Alfred Fremlin	Member for Redfern; 1882 – 1885; With: Alfred Fremlin; John Sutherland	Succeeded by John Sutherland; Arthur Renwick; Thomas Williamson
Preceded by George Matheson	Member for Glen Innes; 1889 – 1903; With: Alexander Hutchison / none	Succeeded by Follett Thomas
Civic offices
Preceded by Patrick Stanley	Mayor of Redfern; 1882 – 1885	Succeeded by George Lander
