= Joseph Palmer Abbott =

Australian politician (1842–1901)

Sir Joseph Palmer Abbott KCMG
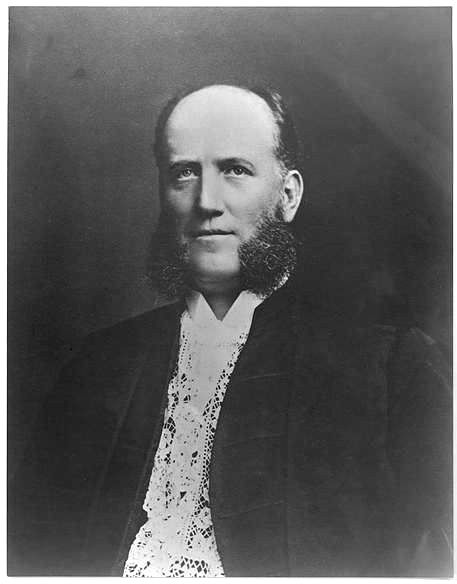

Member of the NSW Legislative Assembly
- In office 29 November 1880 – 11 June 1901

Personal details
- Born: 29 September 1842 Muswellbrook, New South Wales
- Died: 15 September 1901 (aged 58) Turramurra, New South Wales
- Spouse(s): Matilda Elizabeth Macartney (married 1873–1880); Edith Solomon (married 1883–1901)
- Parent(s): John Kingsmill Abbott; Frances Amanda Brady
- Occupation: Politician

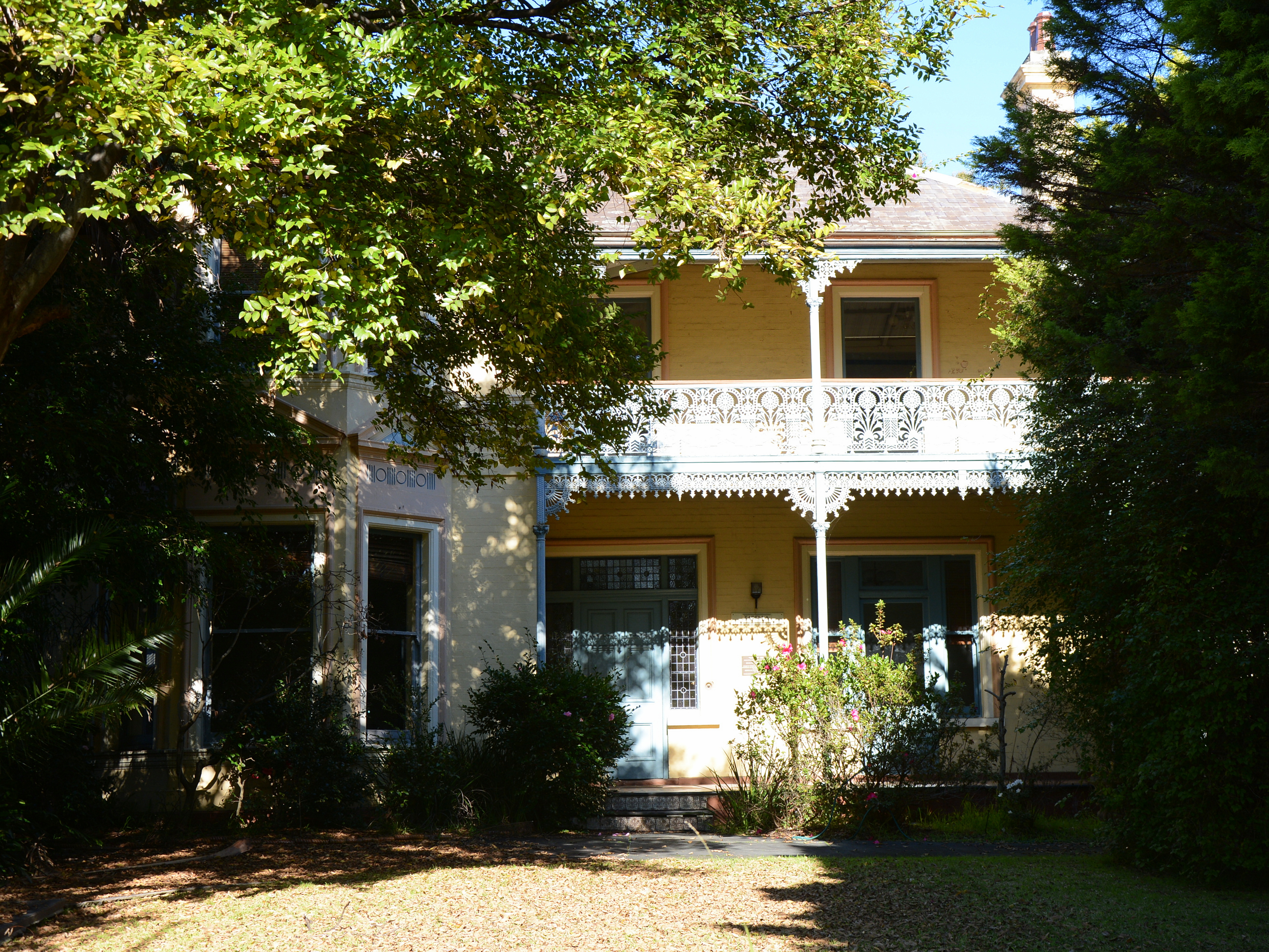
Tarella, Abbott's home after 1886

Sir Joseph Palmer Abbott, KCMG (29 September 1842 – 15 September 1901) was an Australian politician, pastoralist and solicitor.

== Early life ==
Joseph Palmer Abbott was born on 29 September 1842 at Muswellbrook, New South Wales, to John Kingsmill Abbott, a squatter, and his wife Frances Amanda, née Brady. Abbott was educated at the Church of England school at Muswellbrook, moving to John Armstrong's school at Redfern at nine years of age, then to J. R. Huston's Surry Hills Academy and finally to The King's School, Parramatta.

Upon completion of his education in 1857 he returned to the family station "Glengarry", near Wingen in the upper Hunter Valley, where his mother had gone from Muswellbrook in 1847 upon the death of his father.

== Work ==
Abbott was admitted as a solicitor in 1865, and practised law in Murrurundi, specialising in land cases. He was appointed a commissioner of the Supreme Court of New South Wales, for the district of Maitland. Founding a firm, Abbott & Allan in Sydney, Abbott established himself as an expert in property and land law.

He was a director and later chair of the Australian Mutual Provident Society.

== Politics ==
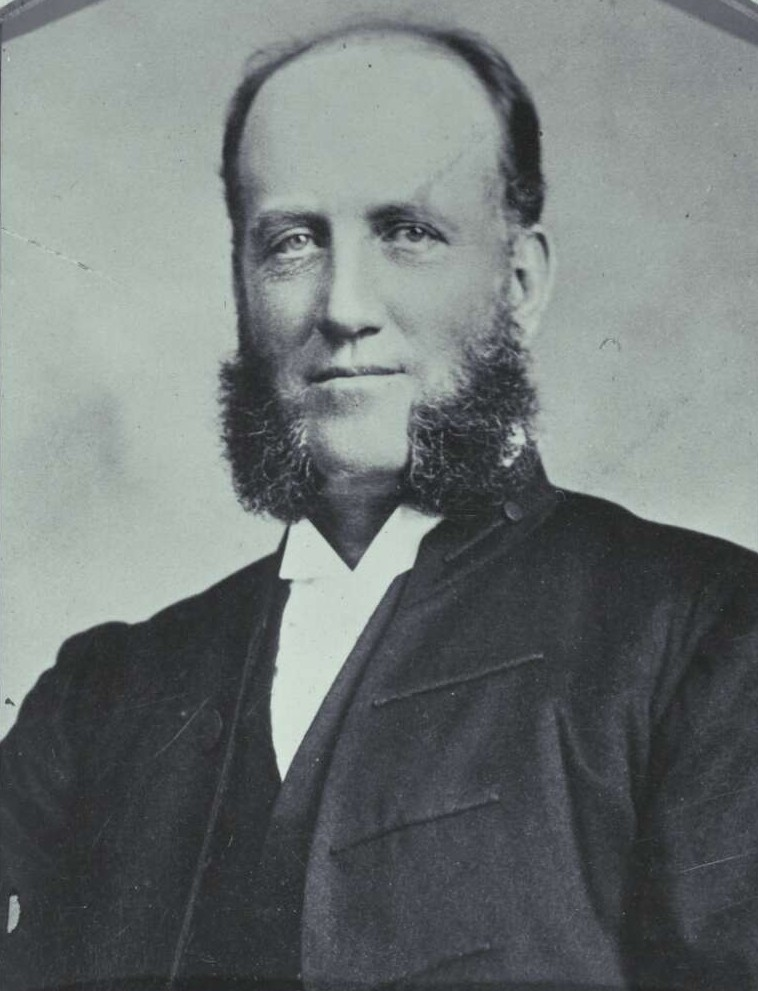
Abbott at the 1898 Australasian Federal Convention.

Abbott was nominated as a candidate for the New South Wales Legislative Assembly for the district of The Williams at the by-election in January 1866, in opposition to Marshall Burdekin who had been appointed colonial treasurer in the fourth Cowper ministry, however he withdrew in favour of Frederick Manton to avoid splitting the liberal vote. Manton was successful, and the Cowper ministry fell, however Manton was forced to vacate the seat due to insolvency two months later. Abbott was nominated at the by-election in April 1866, speaking for two hours and fifty minutes at the nomination, however was unsuccessful with 26.9% of the vote. At the 1870 by-election for Liverpool Plains Abbott was supporting Edward Parnell in opposition to Charles Cowper following the formation of the fifth Cowper ministry, however also nominated himself so that he could demand a poll. He was proposed as a candidate at the 1874 election for the Upper Hunter, however he declined, having already nominated Francis White.

He was elected to the Legislative Assembly as the member for Gunnedah on 29 November 1880. He created the 1881 Hospital Acts Amendment Act, which led to him becoming an honorary governor of several medical facilities. In January 1883, Abbott became the Secretary for Mines in the ministry of Sir Alexander Stuart. After Stuart's resignation in 1885, Abbott became the Secretary for Lands in the ministry of George Dibbs.

He was not a candidate for Gunnedah at the 1887 election, but was nominated for Wentworth without his consent and easily topped the poll at the election on 26 February 1887. He served as the member for Wentworth until he retired from parliament on 11 June 1901.

He was one of the free traders turned protectionists in opposition to the Free Trade Party led by Sir Henry Parkes and was briefly the leader of the Opposition for the Protectionist Party from March 1887. Abbott resigned as leader in May 1887 as he supported Parkes' plan to reform the standing orders of the Legislative Assembly, against the views of his followers. He was nominated as a Protectionist candidate for East Sydney at the 1889 election, however he had been elected unopposed for Wentworth on the same day and the Free Trade Party won all four seats.

Abbott was elected Speaker of the Legislative Assembly in 1890 and had a reputation as an authority on parliamentary procedure. He also imposed dignified control over the formerly unruly Assembly. He resigned the Speakership in 1900.

He was known for his work involving property laws of Australia, and as a New South Wales delegate for the Federation Conventions of 1891, 1897, and 1898 where he was Chairman of Committees.

== Family and social life ==
He was initiated as a Freemason in 1864, and served as Grand Master of the United Grand Lodge of New South Wales from 1895 to 1899. Abbott, along with many other politicians, was a member of the Australian Club and Union Club.

He was knighted in 1892. For his services towards Australian law and politics, he was made a Knight Commander of the Order of St Michael and St George in 1895.

In 1873, at West Maitland, Abbott married Matilda Elizabeth (née Macartney) with whom he had two sons, John Henry (1874–1953) and Macartney (Mac) (1877–1960) and a daughter. Matilda died in 1880. In 1883, at East Maitland, he married Edith (née Solomon); they had one son, Joseph Palmer (Joe) (1891–1965) and three daughters.

- John Henry was a novelist and poet;
- Mac was a solicitor and member of the New South Wales Legislative Assembly for Upper Hunter (1913–1918) and a Senator from 1935 to 1941.
- Joe was a grazier and member for New England in the Australian House of Representatives from 1940 to 1949; and

Abbott lived for a time in Tarella, an Italianate mansion in Amherst Street, Cammeray, which he built c. 1886. Palmer Street in Cammeray is named after him. He died on 15 September 1901 (aged 59), and was buried in Waverley Cemetery.

New South Wales Legislative Assembly
New district	Member for Gunnedah; 1880–1887	Succeeded by Thomas Goodwin
Preceded by Edward Quin	Member for Wentworth; 1887–1901; Served alongside: Macgregor, Browne, none	Succeeded by Robert Scobie
Preceded by James Young	Speaker of the New South Wales Legislative Assembly; 1890–1900	Succeeded by William McCourt
Parliament of New South Wales
Political offices
Preceded by Arthur Renwick	Secretary for Mines; 1883–1885	Succeeded by Francis Wright
Preceded by James Farnell	Secretary for Lands; October – December 1885	Succeeded by Gerald Spring
