= William Fergusson (politician) =

Australian politician

William John Fergusson was a solicitor and politician from New South Wales, Australia.

He was a practicing solicitor in Sydney before entering politics, having been admitted in March 1876. He was elected to the New South Wales Legislative Assembly for Glen Innes, at the 1880 election, serving until 1887. Fergusson supported William Clarke's attempts to form a third party, however these failed with no other parliamentarian joining them, and Fergusson sat with the opposition to the ministry of Patrick Jennings. Political parties emerged in New South Wales in 1887, divided on fiscal lines, and despite his previous opposition to Jennings, Fergusson stood as a Protectionist candidate at the 1887 election for Wentworth, finishing a distant fourth.

Very little is known of his biography, with his parliamentary biography bereft of the usual details. On 14 May 1881 he married Emily Maud Mary née York. He was a partner in the legal firm Fergusson and Broad and by 1893 the partnership was in difficulty, having received £1,000 from a client and £500 went missing. The explanation offered by his partner was that Fergusson, who was in England, had sent a draft and the money lodged in the bank had been used to pay that draft. He was a trustee of the will of James York, and in 1893 the beneficiaries, including his wife sought to have him removed as a trustee and to account for the money received by him.

It appears that he never returned to Australia, and his wife obtained a divorce in 1912 on the grounds of desertion.

Fergusson is believed to have died in New Zealand.

New South Wales Legislative Assembly
| New seat | Member for Glen Innes; 1880–1887 | Succeeded by George Matheson |
