= Follett Thomas =

Australian politician

Follett Johns Thomas (21 October 1863 – 3 January 1942) was an Australian politician.

He was born at Majors Creek, near Araluen in New South Wales, to Richard Uren Thomas and Mary Ann Johns. The family moved to Inverell around 1871 and Thomas attended the public school there before apprenticing to a chemist in Glen Innes. He qualified as a chemist, and also served as an alderman at Glen Innes from 1884 to 1903, as mayor in 1895, 1896, 1902 and 1903. On 30 June 1888 he married Louise Dibley Dawson, with whom he had four children. In 1903 he was elected to the New South Wales Legislative Assembly as the Liberal member for Glen Innes, moving to Gough in 1904. He held the seat until the introduction of proportional representation in 1920, when he was defeated running for Northern Tableland as a Progressive. Thomas died in North Sydney in 1942.

New South Wales Legislative Assembly
Preceded by Francis Wright	Member for Glen Innes; 1903–1904	Abolished
New seat	Member for Gough; 1904–1920	Abolished
