= Electoral district of Eden =

Former state electoral district of New South Wales, Australia

Eden was an electoral district of the Legislative Assembly in the Australian state of New South Wales from 1859 to 1894, including the town of Eden. From 1880 to 1894 it elected two members, with voters casting two votes and the first two candidates being elected. In 1894, single-member electorates were introduced statewide and Eden was split into Eden-Bombala (including Bombala) and Bega. Eden-Bombala was abolished in 1904 and absorbed into Monaro and Bega.

== Members for Eden ==
Single-member (1859–1880)
Member	Party	Term			
Daniel Egan	None	1859–1869			
Henry Clarke	None	1869–1880			
Two members (1880–1894)
Member	Party	Term	Member	Party	Term
Henry Clarke	None	1880–1887	James Garvan	None	1880–1887
Henry Clarke	Protectionist	1887–1894	James Garvan	Protectionist	1887–1894

== Election results ==
1891 New South Wales colonial election: Eden Wednesday 24 June
Party	Candidate	Votes	%	±%
Protectionist	Henry Clarke (elected 1)	1,079	30.3	
Protectionist	James Garvan (elected 2)	1,021	28.7	
Free Trade	William Neilley	603	17.0	
Ind. Protectionist	William Boot	510	14.3	
Ind. Protectionist	Richard Crabb	344	9.7	
Total formal votes		3,557	97.5	
Informal votes		90	2.5	
Turnout		2,690	72.4	
Protectionist hold 2				
