= George Matheson (politician) =

Australian politician (1853–1895)

George McLeod Matheson (1853 – 28 November 1895) was an Australian politician.

He was a sharebroker before entering politics, and was based in Broken Hill. In 1887 he was elected to the New South Wales Legislative Assembly as the Free Trade member for Glen Innes, but he did not re-contest in 1889. He died after falling over the balcony of the Royal Hotel at Coolgardie in 1895.

New South Wales Legislative Assembly
Preceded by William Fergusson	Member for Glen Innes; 1887–1889	Succeeded by Alexander Hutchison; Francis Wright
