= Alexander Hutchison (1838–1908) =

Scottish-born Australian politician

Alexander Hutchison (1838 – 24 August 1908) was a Scottish-born Australian politician.

He was born in Dumfries to farmers Peter and Janet Hutchison. He was a builder, and around 1863 married Agnes Potter, with whom he had eight children. He arrived in New South Wales around 1880. In 1889 he was elected to the New South Wales Legislative Assembly as the Protectionist member for Glen Innes, holding the seat until his defeat in 1894. He died at Stanmore in 1908.

New South Wales Legislative Assembly
Preceded by George Matheson	Member for Glen Innes; 1889–1894; Served alongside: Francis Wright	Succeeded by Francis Wright
