= Henry Clarke (Australian politician) =

Australian businessman and politician

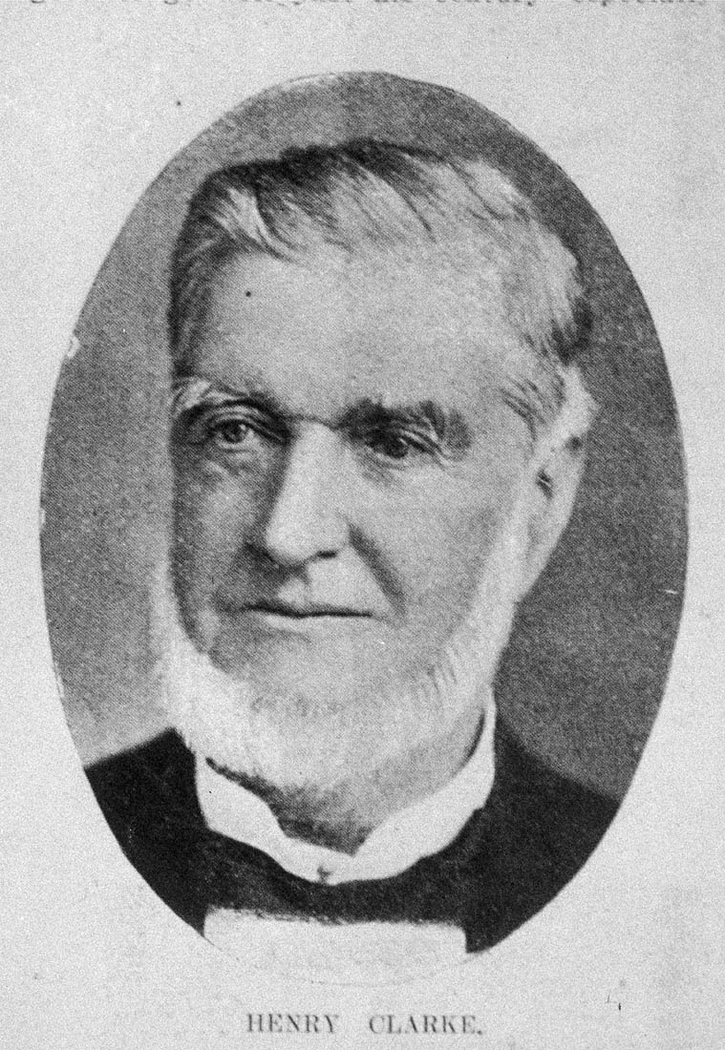

Henry Clarke (22 June 1822 – 22 November 1907) was an Australian businessman and politician in the New South Wales Legislative Assembly.

Clarke was born in Maghera, County Londonderry, Ireland, he emigrated to New South Wales in 1841 and he farmed for a while at Broulee. He returned to Sydney and married Jane Rayner in 1847 and they eventually had eleven children. He and Robert Gee established a successful shipping agency and owned three ships operating between Sydney and Melbourne by 1861. In the early 1860s, he lived for a period at Bergalia station near Moruya, but returned to Sydney in 1865 and worked at his agency until 1894.

== Parliamentary career ==
In 1860, he contested the seat of Eden and lost to Daniel Egan. In 1869 he re-contested Eden and won. He held the seat continually until the district was abolished in 1894 and he stood unsuccessfully for Moruya in 1894. He returned to the parliament in 1895 as the member for Bega, which he held until 1904 when he was defeated by William Wood. He was Postmaster General in the short lived second Dibbs ministry in 1889. He was noted as a hard-working parliamentarian.

Clarke died in Randwick. On his eightieth birthday he had claimed to have two hundred grandchildren and two great-grandchildren.

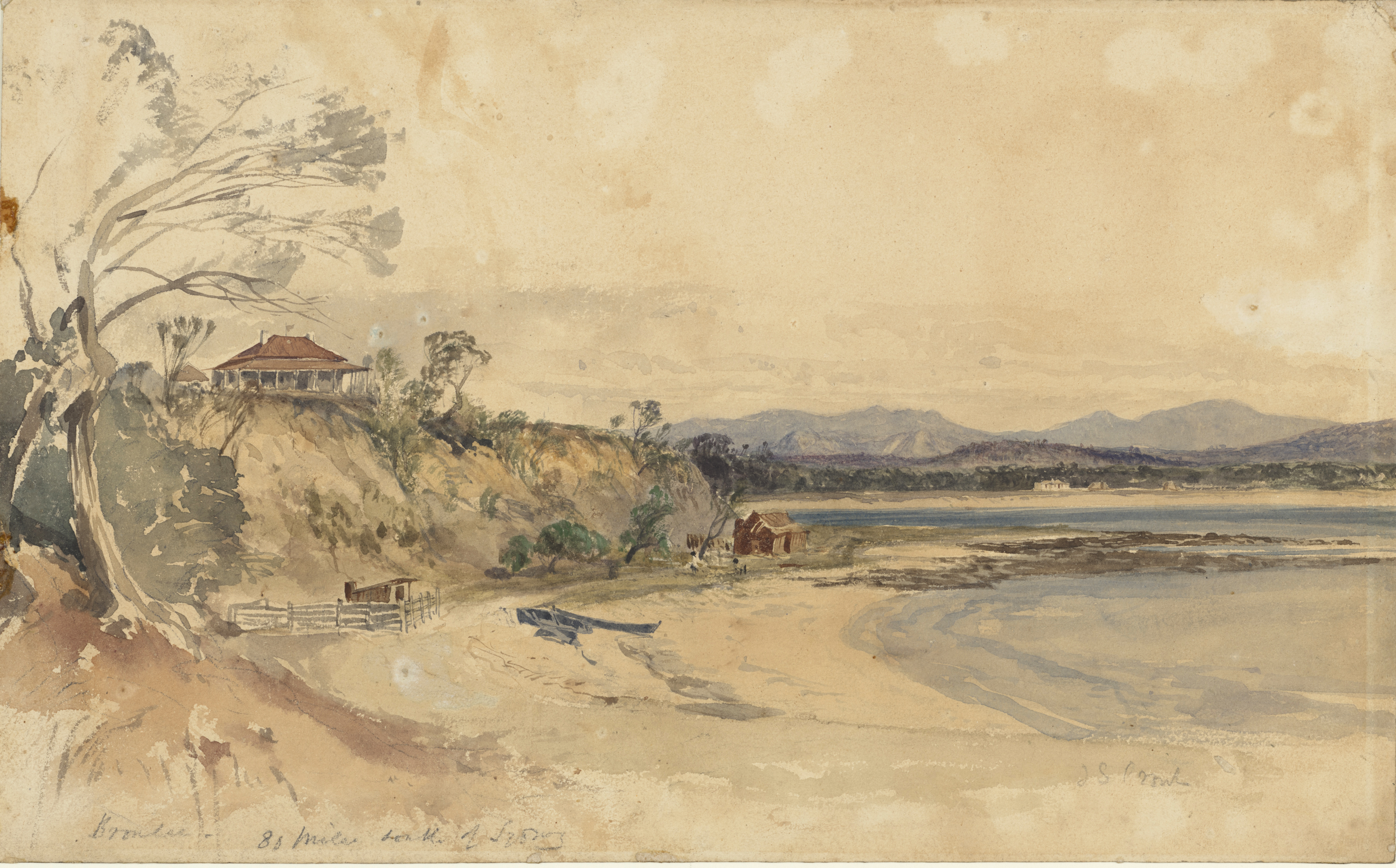
Broulee in 1843; painted by John Skinner Prout in watercolour and gouache

Political offices
Preceded by Charles Roberts	Postmaster-General; January–March 1889	Succeeded by John Kidd
New South Wales Legislative Assembly
Preceded by Daniel Egan	Member for Eden; 1869 – 1894; With: none / James Garvan	Succeeded by District abolished
Preceded by Thomas Rawlinson	Member for Bega; 1895 – 1904	Succeeded by William Wood
