= James Garvan =

Australian politician (1843–1896)

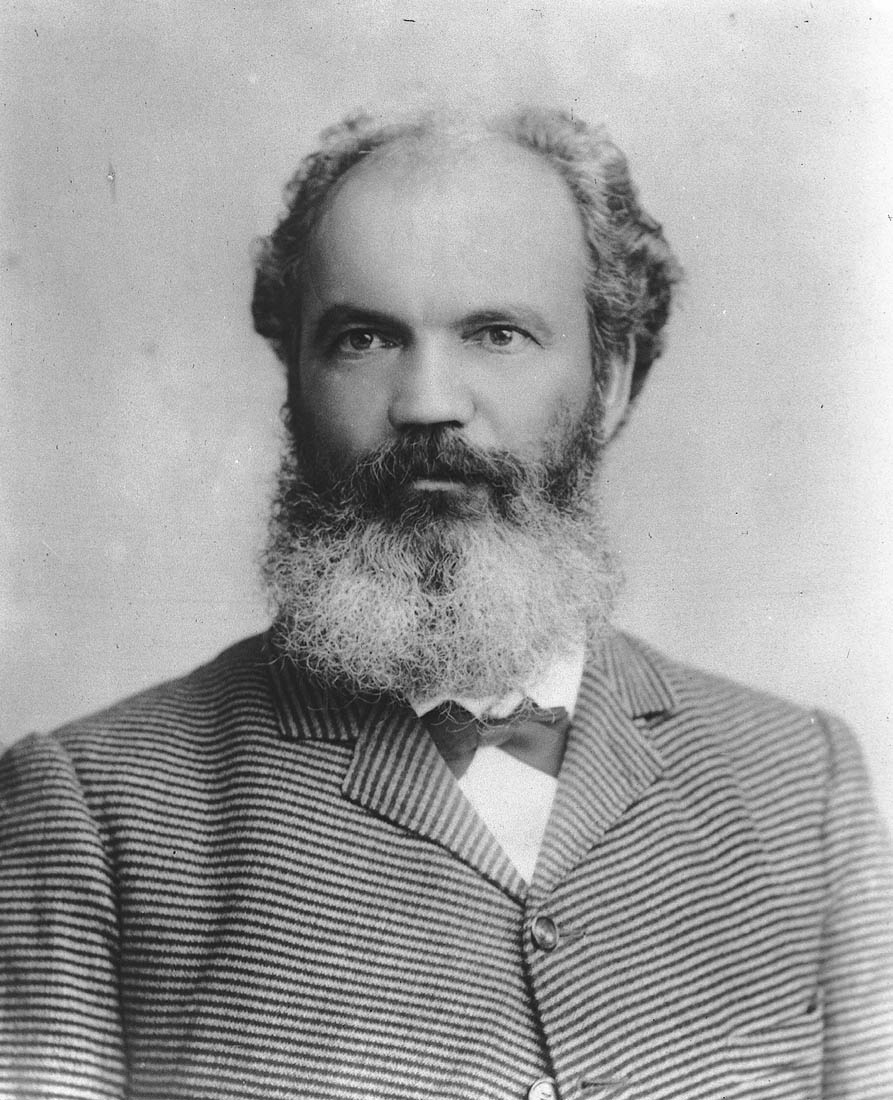

James Patrick Garvan (2 May 1843 – 20 November 1896) was an Australian politician, Colonial Treasurer of New South Wales in 1889.

== Life ==
Garvan was born in Cappagh, County Limerick, Ireland, son of Denis Bourke Garvan and Anne, née Culhane. Garvan founded the North Shore Steam Ferry Co. Ltd., the City Mutual Fire Insurance Co. Ltd and the City Mutual Life Assurance Society Ltd. He represented Eden in the New South Wales Legislative Assembly. He was Minister of Justice in the Jennings ministry from February 1886 to January 1887, and Colonial Treasurer in the second Dibbs ministry from January to March 1889.

== Death ==
Garvan died at North Sydney on 20 November 1896 (aged 53).

His son John Garvan was the inaugural chairman of the Commonwealth Bank of Australia.

After his death, Garvan's daughter Helen Mills donated £100,000 towards the establishment of a medical research institute, which she requested be named the Garvan Institute of Medical Research in her father's honour.

Parliament of New South Wales
Political offices
Preceded by Louis Heydon	Minister of Justice; 1886 – 1887	Succeeded by William Clarke
Preceded by Patrick Jennings	Colonial Treasurer; January – March 1889	Succeeded by William McMillan
New South Wales Legislative Assembly
Preceded by Henry Clarke	Member for Eden; 1880–1894; With: Henry Clarke	District abolished
