= Edward Quin (pastoralist) =

Australian pastoralist, politician

Edward Quin (ca.1843 – 22 November 1922) was a noted pastoralist in the north-west of New South Wales, Australia, who represented Wentworth in the New South Wales Legislative Assembly

== History ==
Quin set up in business in Wilcannia, New South Wales, when that town was in its infancy. In 1872, he took over Tarella Estate, a station of 685,000 acres 50 miles from Wilcannia, and spent £70,000 on improvements on the property, which eventually was carrying 120,000 sheep, 1,000 Shorthorn cattle, and around 180 pure bred horses, plus draught horses and Arabs. He formed a business, Quin, Currie and Co., to operate the business.

In 1881, with Alfred Kirkpatrick of Wilcannia, he purchased Merweh station, in the Warrego River in Queensland. They bought Buckanbe station near Tilpa later the same year.

He was elected a member for Wentworth in the New South Wales Legislative Assembly in a by-election 1882 (an early opponent was E. B. L. Dickens, son of Charles Dickens) and was returned in December that year and again, unopposed, in 1885. He declined to stand in 1887. He was later appointed to the committee which was concerned with the rabbit pest.

He later purchased the Leasowes property, of 505 acres, near Fern Tree Gully.

He retired to live in "Warwillah" in Wangaratta, where he died aged 79 after a prolonged illness.

== Family ==
Quin married Edith Dollman, daughter of an Adelaide chemist, on 15 June 1871 at Wilcannia. They had two sons and six daughters.

Their eldest son, Edward Parmeter Quin (14 April 1872 – 20 February 1942), dubbed "Quin of Tarella", moved to Aruma on the Monaro in 1902, then Narromine, then Cobar, where he established for himself a reputation as a drover, being involved in many long-distance droving trips to Queensland. He retired to Sydney around 1937 but soon moved to a small property called "Kismet" at Kemps Creek, and it was there that he died. His wife, Edith Alice Quin (ca.1868 – 3 March 1944), died in West Hoxton Park, leaving four children: Keith, Eileen and Doreen (Mrs J. Parker).

A daughter, Tarella Ruth Quin, (1877–22 October 1945), was a children's writer who married the pastoralist Thomas S. Daskein (died 3 December 1937).

A sister, Mary Theresa Quin (July 1849 – 8 July 1941), married Quin's business partner Alfred Kirkpatrick (ca.1840 – 13 April 1919) in 1869. Their son Hedley John Kirkpatrick D.S.O. was an officer with the 6th Dragoon Guards then lieutenant colonel in command of the 2nd South African Scottish Regiment. then commanded the 9th South African Infantry in the German East Africa campaign of 1916–1917. He was appointed Commissioner of Police in South West Africa before retiring to the Seychelle Islands in 1934.

New South Wales Legislative Assembly
Preceded by William Brodribb	Member for Wentworth; 1882 – 1887; With: none / William MacGregor	Succeeded by William MacGregor; Joseph Abbott
