= William MacGregor (Australian politician) =

Australian politician

William Peter MacGregor (1853 – 24 February 1899) was a Scottish-born Australian politician.

His parents were Andrew MacGregor and Mary Dove, and he arrived in New South Wales around 1878, settling in Broken Hill. He ran a station near Silverton, and became involved in local mining as a shareholder and businessman. He was chairman of directors of BHP at the time of the 1892 Broken Hill miners' strike.

In 1885 he was elected to the New South Wales Legislative Assembly as the member for Wentworth. He was re-elected in 1887, but resigned later that year.

MacGregor died of pneumonia in East Melbourne in 1899.

New South Wales Legislative Assembly
Preceded by Edward Quin	Member for Wentworth; 1885–1887; Served alongside: Edward Quin/Joseph Abbott	Succeeded by Thomas Browne
