= Thomas Frederic De Courcy Browne =

Australian politician (1838–1899)

Thomas Frederic De Courcy Browne (1838 – 9 October 1899) was an Irish-born Australian politician and journalist.

He was born in Dublin to John Browne and Mary O'Neill. His early life is unclear; some sources state that he was educated at the University of Dublin, while others indicate he went to the Victorian goldmines as an adolescent.

He moved to New South Wales in 1862 and mined at Burrangong Creek, where he became a local journalist and chairman of the mining court. In his capacity as chairman of the mining court, he developed an influential code of mining regulations. He edited the Murrumbidgee Herald at Gundagai for a period, then acquired the Burrangong Tribune in 1864. In 1864, he was also serving as honorary secretary of the Gundagai Hospital. In 1865, he established the Gundagai Herald at Gundagai, but sold it the next year. In 1867, he was a mining agent at Grenfell and was agent there for the Emu Creek Miner; he also served as Clerk of Petty Sessions there until his dismissal in 1868.

In 1868 he followed the gold rush to Gympie, where he was a member of the local mining court. He then accepted an appointment as Acting Clerk of Petty Sessions on the Gilbert River Goldfields in July 1869, but quarreled with the Gold Commissioner, leading to both being removed from their positions.

He returned to New South Wales in 1870, living at Gulgong. In February 1871, he founded the Gulgong Guardian newspaper, which he published and edited until its closure in July 1873. In May 1873, he was found guilty of criminal libel against Thomas Alexander Browne and sentenced to six months imprisonment in Darlinghurst Gaol. He was released after one month on order of the Governor, but was immediately rearrested on embezzlement charges. The Guardian folded two weeks after his second arrest and he was committed for trial in July 1874; the outcome is not known.

In June 1874, he founded another Gulgong area newspaper, the Home Rule Pilot, but this was short-lived. In the same month, he was elected as the Mudgee district representative on the Mining Board of New South Wales, on which he served for several years. He contested the 1874-75 New South Wales election in the seat of Northern Goldfields, but was defeated. In 1880, he was serving as superintendent of the Mudgee Volunteer Fire Brigade. He contested the 1882 election in the Mudgee seat, but was defeated.

Browne was elected to the Legislative Assembly at the 1885 New South Wales colonial election. He was defeated in 1887, but returned in a by-election for Wentworth later that year. He was defeated for good in 1889, and moved to Broken Hill and then to Western Australia.

Browne returned to Sydney in 1898, where he died from "paralysis of the brain" in October 1899. Several newspapers claimed that he had died at the Callan Park Hospital for the Insane. He was buried at Waverley Cemetery.

New South Wales Legislative Assembly
Preceded by David Buchanan	Member for Mudgee; 1885–1887; Served alongside: Sir John Robertson/William Wall, Adolphus Taylor	Succeeded by Reginald Black
Preceded by William MacGregor	Member for Wentworth; 1887–1889; Served alongside: Joseph Abbott	Succeeded by Joseph Abbott
