= Electoral district of Glen Innes =

Former state electoral district of New South Wales, Australia

Glen Innes was an electoral district of the Legislative Assembly in the Australian state of New South Wales, named after Glen Innes. It was created in 1880 and gained a second member in 1889, with voters casting two votes with the two leading candidates being elected. In 1894, it became a single-member electorate and, in 1904, it was abolished and replaced by Gough.

== Members for Glen Innes ==
Single-member (1880–1889)
| Member | Party | Term | | | |
|---|---|---|---|---|---|
| William Fergusson | None | 1880–1887 | | | |
| George Matheson | Free Trade | 1887–1889 | | | |
Two members (1889–1894)
| Member | Party | Term | Member | Party | Term |
| Alexander Hutchison | Protectionist | 1889–1894 | Francis Wright | Protectionist | 1889–1894 |
Single-member (1894–1904)
| Member | Party | Term | | | |
| Francis Wright | Protectionist | 1894–1901 | | | |
| Francis Wright | Protectionist | 1901–1903 | | | |
| Follett Thomas | Liberal Reform | 1903–1904 | | | |

== Election results ==
1903 Glen Innes by-election Wednesday 28 October
| Party | Candidate | Votes | % | ±% |
|---|---|---|---|---|
| Liberal Reform | Follett Thomas (elected) | 865 | 58.1 | +27.1 |
| Progressive | Alexander Hay | 624 | 41.9 | +1.8 |
| Total formal votes | | 1,489 | 99.3 | +0.5 |
| Informal votes | | 10 | 0.7 | −0.5 |
| Turnout | | 1,499 | 66.6 (Note: Estimate based on a roll of 2,252 at the 1901 election.) | +1.1 |
| Liberal Reform gain from Progressive | | | | |

Francis Wright died.
