= 1887 New South Wales colonial election =

Colonial election for New South Wales

- 4 February 1887 – 26 February 1887

All 124 seats in the New South Wales Legislative Assembly 63 Assembly seats were needed for a majority
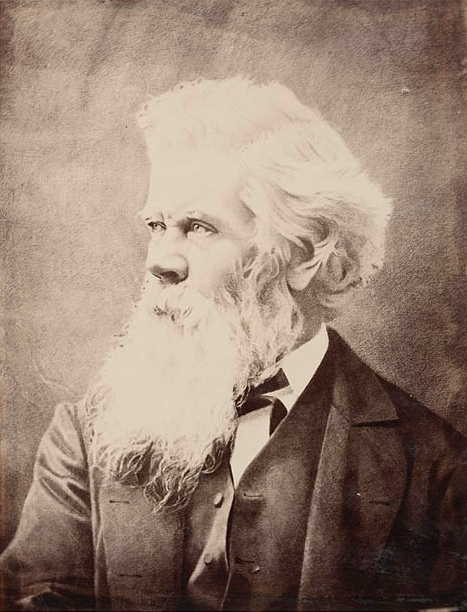

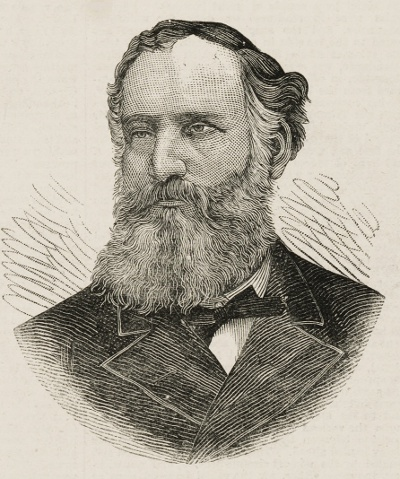
	First party	Second party
Leader	Sir Henry Parkes	George Dibbs
Party	Free Trade	Protectionist
Leader since	1886	20 January 1887
Leader's seat	St Leonards	Murrumbidgee
Seats won	79 seats	37 seats
Percentage	60.75%	32.89%
- Results of the election, showing winners in each seat. Seats without circles indicate the electorate returned one member.
Premier before election
Sir Henry Parkes
Free Trade
Elected Premier
Sir Henry Parkes
Free Trade

The 1887 New South Wales colonial election was held between 4 February and 26 February 1887. This election was for all of the 124 seats in the New South Wales Legislative Assembly and it was conducted in 37 single-member constituencies, 23 2-member constituencies, seven 3-member constituencies and five 4-member constituencies, all with a first past the post system. Part 1 (section 13) of the Electoral Act of 1880 had awarded the right to vote to 'every male subject of Her Majesty of the full age of twenty-one years and absolutely free being a natural born or naturalized'. The previous parliament of New South Wales was dissolved on 26 January 1887 by the Governor, Lord Carrington, on the advice of the Premier, Sir Henry Parkes.

Parkes had defeated the government of Patrick Jennings less than a week previously, and was keen to test his electoral strength. This was the first election at which there were recognisable political parties, namely the Protectionist Party, which coalesced around Jennings' successor George Dibbs, and Parkes' Free Trade Party. At this stage these parties were still organisationally very different from today's political parties, and party affiliation was often fluid or non-existent, depending on the individual member.

== Key dates ==
Date	Event
26 January 1887	The Legislative Assembly was dissolved, and writs were issued by the Governor to proceed with an election.
2 February to 18 February 1887	Nominations for candidates for the election closed.
4 February to 26 February 1887	Polling days.
8 March 1887	Opening of new Parliament.

== Results ==
New South Wales colonial election, 4 – 26 February 1887 Legislative Assembly << 1885–1889 >>
Enrolled voters					
Votes cast	128,787		Turnout	57.84	−3.26
Informal votes	2,275		Informal	1.74	−0.27
Summary of votes by party
Party	Primary votes	%	Swing	Seats	Change
Free Trade	78,238	60.75	n/a	79	n/a
Protectionist	42,354	32.89	n/a	37	n/a
Ind. Free Trade	4,159	3.23	n/a	4	n/a
Ind. Protectionist	3,105	2.41	n/a	4	n/a
Independent	931	0.72	n/a	0	n/a
Total	252,004			124	

Popular vote
Free Trade	60.75%
Protectionist	32.89%
Ind. Free Trade	3.23%
Ind. Protectionist	2.41%
Independent	0.72%
Parliamentary seats
Free Trade	79
Protectionist	37
Ind. Free Trade	4
Ind. Protectionist	4

== See also ==
- Members of the New South Wales Legislative Assembly, 1887–1889
- Candidates of the 1887 New South Wales colonial election
