= Electoral district of Wentworth =

Former state electoral district of New South Wales, Australia

Wentworth was an electoral district for the Legislative Assembly in the far south west of the Australian state of New South Wales and named after and including the town of Wentworth. It established in 1880 and partly replacing Lachlan. From 1885 until 1889 it elected two members. The population in Wentworth had grown significantly since the 1880 redistribution, especially as a result of the growth of mining at Broken Hill, with the electoral roll growing from 1,901 in 1880 to 5,617 in 1887. Under the formula for seats, Wentworth was due to return 3 members, however because of the large area covered by the district, in 1889 it was split into 3, Wentworth, Sturt and Wilcannia. Wentworth retained the eponymous town, along with the towns of Menindie and Pooncaira. Sturt contained the mining boom towns of Broken Hill, Silverton and Milparinka while Wilcannia was the only town in that district.

The district was abolished in 1904 due to the re-distribution of electorates following the 1903 New South Wales referendum, which required the number of members of the Legislative Assembly to be reduced from 125 to 90. It was replaced by a re-created district of The Murray along with parts of The Lachlan and the abolished district of Hay.

== Members for Wentworth ==
Single-member (1880–1885)
| Member | Party | Term | | | |
|---|---|---|---|---|---|
| William Brodribb | None | 1880–1882 | | | |
| Edward Quin | None | 1882–1885 | | | |
Two members (1885–1889)
| Member | Party | Term | Member | Party | Term |
| Edward Quin | None | 1885–1887 | William MacGregor | None | 1885–1887 |
| Joseph Abbott | Protectionist | 1887–1889 | William MacGregor | Ind. Free Trade | 1887–1887 |
| Joseph Abbott | Protectionist | 1887–1889 | Thomas Browne | Protectionist | 1887–1889 |
Single-member (1889–1894)
| Member | Party | Term | | | |
| (Sir) Joseph Abbott | Protectionist | 1889–1891 | | | |
| (Sir) Joseph Abbott | Independent | 1891–1894 | | | |
| (Sir) Joseph Abbott | Protectionist | 1894–1901 | | | |
| Robert Scobie | Labor | 1901–1904 | | | |

== Election results ==
1901 New South Wales state election: Wentworth
| Party | Candidate | Votes | % | ±% |
|---|---|---|---|---|
| Labour | Robert Scobie | 649 | 63.3 | +32.3 |
| Independent | Harry Harben | 258 | 25.2 | |
| Independent | Thomas Boynton | 85 | 8.3 | |
| Independent Liberal | Alexander Cameron | 34 | 3.3 | |
| Total formal votes | | 1,026 | 99.1 | +0.3 |
| Informal votes | | 9 | 0.9 | −0.3 |
| Turnout | | 1,035 | 60.7 | +17.0 |
| Labour gain from Progressive | | | | |

The sitting member was Sir Joseph Abbott (Protectionist) who did not contest the election.
