= Electoral results for the district of Yass Plains =

Election results for Yass Plains, New South Wales, Australia

Yass Plains, an electoral district of the Legislative Assembly in the Australian state of New South Wales, was created in 1859 and abolished in 1894.

Election	Member	Party
1859	Thomas Laidlaw	None
1859 by	Thomas Laidlaw	None
1860	Henry O'Brien	None
1861 by	Peter Faucett	None
1864	Peter Faucett	None
1865 by	Robert Isaacs	None
1866 by	Robert Isaacs	None
1869	Michael Fitzpatrick	None
1872	Michael Fitzpatrick	None
1874	Michael Fitzpatrick	None
1877	Michael Fitzpatrick	None
1878 by	Michael Fitzpatrick	None
1880	Michael Fitzpatrick	None
1882 by	Louis Heydon	None
1882	Louis Heydon	None
1885	Louis Heydon	None
1886 by	Thomas Colls	None
1887	Thomas Colls	Protectionist
1889	Thomas Colls	Protectionist
1891	Thomas Colls	Protectionist

== Election results ==
=== Elections in the 1890s ===
==== 1891 ====
1891 New South Wales colonial election: Yass Plains Wednesday 24 June
Party	Candidate	Votes	%	±%
Protectionist	Thomas Colls (re-elected)	709	56.7	
Free Trade	William Affleck	210	16.8	
Protectionist	Bernard Grogan	199	15.9	
Labour	Gustavus Herfort	132	10.6	
Total formal votes		1,250	97.7	
Informal votes		30	2.3	
Turnout		1,280	56.9	
Protectionist hold				

=== Elections in the 1880s ===
==== 1889 ====
1889 New South Wales colonial election: Yass Plains Monday 28 January
Party	Candidate	Votes	%	±%
Protectionist	Thomas Colls (re-elected)	unopposed		
Total formal votes		1,015	98.5	
Informal votes		16	1.6	
Turnout		1,031	45.7	
Protectionist hold				

==== 1887 ====
1887 New South Wales colonial election: Yass Plains Saturday 19 February
Party	Candidate	Votes	%	±%
Protectionist	Thomas Colls (re-elected)	691	56.9	
Free Trade	Henry Donaldson	524	43.1	
Total formal votes		1,215	98.2	
Informal votes		22	1.8	
Turnout		1,247	63.9	

==== 1886 by-election ====
1886 Yass Plains by-election Monday 20 December
Candidate	Votes	%
Thomas Colls (elected)	603	54.2
Richard Colonna-Close	509	45.8
Total formal votes	1,112	100.0
Informal votes	0	0.0
Turnout	1,112	57.0

Louis Heydon resigned.

==== 1885 ====
1885 New South Wales colonial election: Yass Plains Monday 19 October
Candidate	Votes	%
Louis Heydon (re-elected)	601	55.4
Richard Colonna-Close	483	44.6
Total formal votes	1,084	96.1
Informal votes	44	3.9
Turnout	1,128	61.4

==== 1882 ====
1882 New South Wales colonial election: Yass Plains Wednesday 6 December
Candidate	Votes	%
Louis Heydon (re-elected)	669	60.2
Henry Dodds	442	39.8
Total formal votes	1,111	96.6
Informal votes	39	3.4
Turnout	1,150	57.4

==== 1882 by-election ====
1882 Yass Plains by-election Tuesday 10 January
Candidate	Votes	%
Louis Heydon (elected)	674	53.7
Allan Campbell	580	46.3
Total formal votes	1,254	97.2
Informal votes	36	2.8
Turnout	1,290	68.2

Michael Fitzpatrick died.

==== 1880 ====
1880 New South Wales colonial election: Yass Plains Tuesday 23 November
Candidate	Votes	%
Michael Fitzpatrick (re-elected)	562	59.6
Henry Dodds	381	40.4
Total formal votes	943	97.7
Informal votes	22	2.3
Turnout	964	51.9

==== 1878 by-election ====
1878 Yass Plains by-election Wednesday 2 January
Candidate	Votes	%
Michael Fitzpatrick (re-elected)	290	92.9
Arthur Remmington	22	7.1
Total formal votes	312	98.7
Informal votes	4	1.3
Turnout	316	18.2

Michael Fitzpatrick was appointed Colonial Secretary in the Farnell ministry.

=== Elections in the 1870s ===
==== 1877 ====
1877 New South Wales colonial election: Yass Plains Wednesday 31 October
Candidate	Votes	%
Michael Fitzpatrick (re-elected)	382	52.3
Michael Perry	327	44.8
Arthur Remmington	21	2.9
Total formal votes	730	96.6
Informal votes	26	3.4
Turnout	756	43.6

==== 1874 ====
1874–75 New South Wales colonial election: Yass Plains Friday 18 December 1874
Candidate	Votes	%
Michael Fitzpatrick (re-elected)	412	53.2
Arthur Remmington	362	46.8
Total formal votes	774	98.2
Informal votes	14	1.8
Turnout	788	43.8

==== 1872 ====
1872 New South Wales colonial election: Yass Plains Friday 8 March
Candidate	Votes	%
Michael Fitzpatrick (re-elected)	unopposed	

=== Elections in the 1860s ===
==== 1869 ====
1869–70 New South Wales colonial election: Yass Plains Friday 24 December 1869
Candidate	Votes	%
Michael Fitzpatrick (elected)	show of hands	
Thomas Laidlaw		

==== 1866 by-election ====
1866 Yass Plains by-election Thursday 8 February
Candidate	Votes	%
Robert Isaacs (re-elected)	406	71.6
Robert Ross	161	28.4
Total formal votes	567	100.0
Informal votes	0	0.0
Turnout	567	46.6

Robert Isaacs was appointed Solicitor General in the second Martin ministry.

==== 1865 by-election ====
1865 Yass Plains by-election Monday 6 November
Candidate	Votes	%
Robert Isaacs (elected)	unopposed	

Peter Faucett accepted appointment as a judge of the Supreme Court.

==== 1864 ====
1864–65 New South Wales colonial election: Yass Plains Tuesday 20 December 1864
Candidate	Votes	%
Peter Faucett (re-elected)	480	71.0
William Harbottle	196	29.0
Total formal votes	676	100.0
Informal votes	0	0.0
Turnout	676	55.5

==== 1861 by-election ====
1861 Yass Plains by-election Thursday 15 August
Candidate	Votes	%
Peter Faucett (elected)	unopposed	

Henry O'Brien resigned.

==== 1860 ====
1860 New South Wales colonial election: Yass Plains Saturday 15 December
Candidate	Votes	%
Henry O'Brien (elected)	unopposed	

=== Elections in the 1850s ===
==== 1859 by-election ====
1859 Yass Plains by-election Thursday 15 September
Candidate	Votes	%
Thomas Laidlaw (elected)	unopposed	

Thomas Laidlaw resigned as he held the office of deputy postmaster at the time of his election.

==== 1859 ====
1859 New South Wales colonial election: Yass Plains Friday 24 June
Candidate	Votes	%
Thomas Laidlaw (elected)	unopposed	
