= Electoral results for the district of Yass =

Election results for Yass, New South Wales, Australia

Yass, an electoral district of the Legislative Assembly in the Australian state of New South Wales, had two incarnations, from 1894 to 1920 and from 1930 to 1950.

Election	Member	Party
1894	William Affleck	Free Trade
1895	William Affleck	Free Trade
1898	William Affleck	Free Trade
1901	William Affleck	Liberal Reform
1904	Niels Nielsen	Labor
1907	Niels Nielsen	Labor
1910	Niels Nielsen	Labor
1913	Niels Nielsen	Labor
1913 by	Greg McGirr	Labor
1917	Greg McGirr	Labor
Election	Member	Party
1930	George Ardill	Nationalist
1932	George Ardill	United Australia
1935	George Ardill	United Australia
1938	George Ardill	United Australia
1941	Bill Sheahan	Labor
1944	Bill Sheahan	Labor
1947	Bill Sheahan	Labor

== Election results ==
=== Elections in the 1940s ===
==== 1947 ====
1947 New South Wales state election: Yass
Party	Candidate	Votes	%	±%
Labor	Bill Sheahan	8,393	60.4	−39.6
Country	John MacKay	3,957	28.5	+28.5
Liberal	Noel Barber	1,384	10.0	+10.0
Independent	John Cusack	163	1.2	+1.2
Total formal votes		13,897	99.0	
Informal votes		137	1.0	
Turnout		14,043	95.5	
Labor hold		Swing	N/A	

- Preferences were not distributed.

==== 1944 ====
1944 New South Wales state election: Yass
Party	Candidate	Votes	%	±%
Labor	Bill Sheahan	unopposed		
Labor hold				

==== 1941 ====
1941 New South Wales state election: Yass
Party	Candidate	Votes	%	±%
Labor	Bill Sheahan	7,941	55.5	
Country	Bill Ross	6,363	44.5	
Total formal votes		14,304	99.4	
Informal votes		84	0.6	
Turnout		14,388	94.3	
Labor gain from Country		Swing		

=== Elections in the 1930s ===
==== 1938 ====
1938 New South Wales state election: Yass
Party	Candidate	Votes	%	±%
United Australia	George Ardill	7,074	57.4	−0.4
Independent	Vivian Partridge	5,240	42.6	+42.6
Total formal votes		12,314	98.5	−0.1
Informal votes		186	1.5	+0.1
Turnout		12,500	96.1	−1.0
United Australia hold		Swing	N/A	

==== 1935 ====
1935 New South Wales state election: Yass
Party	Candidate	Votes	%	±%
United Australia	George Ardill	7,206	57.8	−4.1
Labor (NSW)	John Cleary	5,263	42.2	+4.1
Total formal votes		12,469	98.6	+0.2
Informal votes		180	1.4	−0.2
Turnout		12,649	97.1	−0.2
United Australia hold		Swing	−4.1	

==== 1932 ====
1932 New South Wales state election: Yass
Party	Candidate	Votes	%	±%
United Australia	George Ardill	7,364	61.9	+33.5
Labor (NSW)	Reginald O'Brien	4,524	38.1	−8.2
Total formal votes		11,888	98.4	+0.2
Informal votes		197	1.6	−0.2
Turnout		12,085	97.3	+1.1
United Australia hold		Swing	+11.3	

==== 1930 ====
1930 New South Wales state election: Yass
Party	Candidate	Votes	%	±%
Labor	William Webster	5,368	46.3	
Nationalist	George Ardill	3,296	28.4	
Country	Thomas Collins	2,942	25.3	
Total formal votes		11,606	98.2	
Informal votes		208	1.8	
Turnout		11,814	96.2	
Two-party-preferred result
Nationalist	George Ardill	5,876	50.6	
Labor	William Webster	5,730	49.4	
Nationalist win		(new seat)		

District recreated

==== 1920 - 1930 ====
District abolished

=== Elections in the 1910s ===
==== 1917 ====
1917 New South Wales state election: Yass
Party	Candidate	Votes	%	±%
Labor	Greg McGirr	4,524	57.8	+7.1
Nationalist	Patrick Bourke	3,308	42.2	+9.3
Total formal votes		7,832	98.7	+1.6
Informal votes		100	1.3	−1.6
Turnout		7,932	70.0	−5.1
Labor hold		Swing	+7.1	

==== 1913 ====
1913 New South Wales state election: Yass
Party	Candidate	Votes	%	±%
Labor	Greg McGirr	4,498	50.7	
Farmers and Settlers	Patrick Bourke (Note: Also endorsed by Liberal Reform.)	2,921	32.9	
Country Party Association	Robert Donaldson (defeated)	1,448	16.3	
Total formal votes		8,867	97.1	
Informal votes		260	2.9	
Turnout		9,127	75.1	
Labor hold				

Robert Donaldson was the sitting member for Wynyard which had been largely replaced by Yass.

==== 1913 by-election ====
1913 Yass by-election Wednesday 5 March
Party	Candidate	Votes	%	±%
Labor	Greg McGirr	2,972	50.3	−3.2
Liberal Reform	Patrick Bourke	2,931	49.7	+3.2
Total formal votes		5,903	100.0	+1.4
Informal votes		0	0.0	−1.4
Turnout		5,903	73.8 (Note: Estimate based on a roll of 8,001 at the 1910 election.)	+0.1
Labor hold		Swing	−3.2	

Niels Nielsen (Labor) resigned.

=== Elections in the 1900s ===
==== 1910 ====
1910 New South Wales state election: Yass
Party	Candidate	Votes	%	±%
Labour	Niels Nielsen	3,113	53.5	
Liberal Reform	Bernard Grogan	2,705	46.5	
Total formal votes		5,818	98.6	
Informal votes		81	1.4	
Turnout		5,899	73.7	
Labour hold				

==== 1907 ====
1907 New South Wales state election: Yass
Party	Candidate	Votes	%	±%
Labour	Niels Nielsen	2,705	52.4	
Liberal Reform	Bernard Grogan	2,453	47.6	
Total formal votes		5,158	98.0	
Informal votes		104	2.0	
Turnout		5,262	71.0	
Labour hold				

==== 1904 ====
1904 New South Wales state election: Yass
Party	Candidate	Votes	%	±%
Labour	Niels Nielsen	2,260	52.2	
Liberal Reform	William Affleck	2,052	47.4	
Progressive	Bernard Grogan	17	0.4	
Total formal votes		4,329	98.3	
Informal votes		77	1.8	
Turnout		4,406	67.0	
Labour gain from Liberal Reform				

Yass lost part of the electorate to Queanbeyan and was expanded to include parts of the abolished seats of Boorowa and West Macquarie. The member for Yass was William Affleck (Liberal Reform) while the member for Boorowa was Niels Nielsen (Labour). The member for West Macquarie was Paddy Crick (Progressive) who successfully contested Blayney.

==== 1901 ====
1901 New South Wales state election: Yass
Party	Candidate	Votes	%	±%
Liberal Reform	William Affleck	875	52.3	+5.8
Progressive	Bernard Grogan	799	47.7	+4.3
Total formal votes		1,674	100.0	+1.2
Informal votes		0	0.0	−1.2
Turnout		1,674	75.5	+12.1
Liberal Reform hold				

=== Elections in the 1890s ===
==== 1898 ====
1898 New South Wales colonial election: Yass
Party	Candidate	Votes	%	±%
Free Trade	William Affleck	599	46.5	
National Federal	Bernard Grogan	560	43.4	
Independent Federalist	George Harrison	130	10.1	
Total formal votes		1,289	98.8	
Informal votes		16	1.2	
Turnout		1,305	63.4	
Free Trade hold				

==== 1895 ====
1895 New South Wales colonial election: Yass
Party	Candidate	Votes	%	±%
Free Trade	William Affleck	631	54.8	
Protectionist	Thomas Colls	520	45.2	
Total formal votes		1,151	99.1	
Informal votes		11	1.0	
Turnout		1,162	65.1	
Free Trade hold				

==== 1894 ====
1894 New South Wales colonial election: Yass
Party	Candidate	Votes	%	±%
Free Trade	William Affleck	516	39.8	
Protectionist	Thomas Colls	440	33.9	
Ind. Protectionist	Argyle McCallum	342	26.4	
Total formal votes		1,298	99.2	
Informal votes		10	0.8	
Turnout		1,308	72.4	
Free Trade gain from Protectionist				

Yass Plains was renamed Yass. Thomas Colls (Protectionist) was the sitting member for Yass Plains.
