= Electoral results for the district of Patrick's Plains =

Election results for Patrick's Plains, New South Wales, Australia

Patrick's Plains, an electoral district of the Legislative Assembly in the Australian state of New South Wales, was created in 1859 and abolished in 1894.

Member	Party	Term
1859	William Russell	None
1860	William Lesley	None
1861 by	Joseph Harpur	None
1864	Bowie Wilson	None
1866 by	Bowie Wilson	None
1869	James Hoskins	None
1872	William Browne	None
1874	William Browne	None
1877	William Browne	None
1880	John Brown	None
1882	Albert Gould	None
1885	Albert Gould	None
1887	Albert Gould	Free Trade
1889	Albert Gould	Free Trade
1891	Albert Gould	Free Trade

== Election results ==
=== Elections in the 1890s ===
==== 1891 ====
1891 New South Wales colonial election: Patrick's Plains Friday 19 June
Party	Candidate	Votes	%	±%
Free Trade	Albert Gould (re-elected)	790	58.1	
Protectionist	Alfred De Lissa	570	41.9	
Total formal votes		1,360	99.3	
Informal votes		10	0.7	
Turnout		1,370	70.7	
Free Trade hold				

=== Elections in the 1880s ===
==== 1889 ====
1889 New South Wales colonial election: Patrick's Plains Saturday 9 February
Party	Candidate	Votes	%	±%
Free Trade	Albert Gould (elected)	667	51.8	
Protectionist	William Browne	620	48.2	
Total formal votes		1,287	99.1	
Informal votes		12	0.9	
Turnout		1,299	72.4	
Free Trade hold				

==== 1887 ====
1887 New South Wales colonial election: Patrick's Plains Thursday 10 February
Party	Candidate	Votes	%	±%
Free Trade	Albert Gould (re-elected)	unopposed		

==== 1887 ====
1887 New South Wales colonial election: Patrick's Plains Thursday 10 February
Party	Candidate	Votes	%	±%
Free Trade	Albert Gould (re-elected)	unopposed		

==== 1885 ====
1885 New South Wales colonial election: Patrick's Plains Wednesday 28 October
Candidate	Votes	%
Albert Gould (re-elected)	676	55.2
William Browne	548	44.8
Total formal votes	1,224	99.0
Informal votes	12	1.0
Turnout	1,236	78.6

==== 1882 ====
1882 New South Wales colonial election: Patrick's Plains Thursday 7 December
Candidate	Votes	%
Albert Gould (elected)	393	38.4
William Browne	359	35.1
James Hutchinson	230	22.5
John Elliott	41	4.0
Total formal votes	1,023	97.8
Informal votes	23	2.2
Turnout	1,046	67.0

==== 1880 ====
1880 New South Wales colonial election: Patrick's Plains Thursday 25 November
Candidate	Votes	%
John Brown (elected)	493	50.3
William Browne (defeated)	487	49.7
Total formal votes	980	97.3
Informal votes	27	2.7
Turnout	1,007	66.2

=== Elections in the 1870s ===
==== 1877 ====
1877 New South Wales colonial election: Patrick's Plains Tuesday 30 October
Candidate	Votes	%
William Browne (re-elected)	468	63.6
William Durham	268	36.4
Total formal votes	736	97.1
Informal votes	22	2.9
Turnout	758	52.8

==== 1874 ====
1874–75 New South Wales colonial election: Patrick's Plains Wednesday 16 December 1874
Candidate	Votes	%
William Browne (re-elected)	664	75.0
Alexander Bowman	221	25.0
Total formal votes	885	98.1
Informal votes	17	1.9
Turnout	902	58.4

==== 1872 ====
1872 New South Wales colonial election: Patrick's Plains Tuesday 27 February
Candidate	Votes	%
William Browne (elected)	535	61.9
Alexander Bowman	330	38.2
Total formal votes	865	97.6
Informal votes	21	2.4
Turnout	886	54.0

=== Elections in the 1860s ===
==== 1869 ====
1869–70 New South Wales colonial election: Patrick's Plains Thursday 23 December 1869
Candidate	Votes	%
James Hoskins (re-elected)	482	54.2
Bowie Wilson (defeated)	407	45.8
Total formal votes	889	100.0
Informal votes	0	0.0
Turnout	910	54.9

==== 1866 by-election ====
1866 Patrick's Plains by-election Thursday 8 February
Candidate	Votes	%
Bowie Wilson (re-elected)	339	70.5
E E Darvall	142	29.5
Total formal votes	481	100.0
Informal votes	0	0.0
Turnout	481	29.4

Bowie Wilson was appointed Secretary for Lands in the second Martin ministry.

==== 1864 ====
1864–65 New South Wales colonial election: Patrick's Plains Friday 9 December 1864
Candidate	Votes	%
Bowie Wilson (re-elected)	314	56.3
John Waller	244	43.7
Total formal votes	558	100.0
Informal votes	0	0.0
Turnout	579	37.8

==== 1861 by-election ====
1861 Patrick's Plains by-election Thursday 4 July
Candidate	Votes	%
Joseph Harpur (elected)	unopposed	

William Lesley resigned.

==== 1860 ====
1860 New South Wales colonial election: Patrick's Plains Thursday 13 December
Candidate	Votes	%
William Lesley (elected)	261	58.1
William Russell (defeated)	177	39.4
Walter Rotton	11	2.5
Total formal votes	449	100.0
Informal votes	0	0.0
Turnout	469	47.5

=== Elections in the 1850s ===
==== 1859 ====
1859 New South Wales colonial election: Patrick's Plains Thursday 30 June
Candidate	Votes	%
William Russell (elected)	264	57.4
James Dickson	196	42.6
Total formal votes	460	100.0
Informal votes	0	0.0
Turnout	460	53.3
