= Electoral results for the district of Boorowa =

Election results for Boorowa, New South Wales, Australia

Boorowa, an electoral district of the Legislative Assembly in the Australian state of New South Wales was created in 1880 and abolished in 1904.

Election	Member	Party
1880	Thomas Slattery	None
1882	Thomas Slattery	None
1885	Thomas Slattery	None
1887	Thomas Slattery	Protectionist
1889	Thomas Slattery	Protectionist
1891	Thomas Slattery	Protectionist
1894	Thomas Slattery	Protectionist
1895 by	Kenneth Mackay	Protectionist
1895	Kenneth Mackay	Protectionist
1898	Kenneth Mackay	Protectionist
1899 by	Niels Nielsen	Labour
1901	Niels Nielsen	Labour

== Election results ==
=== Elections in the 1900s ===
==== 1901 ====
1901 New South Wales state election: Boorowa
Party	Candidate	Votes	%	±%
Labour	Niels Nielsen	1,128	76.2	+38.4
Ind. Progressive	Herbert O'Leary	352	23.8	
Total formal votes		1,480	98.9	+0.2
Informal votes		17	1.1	−0.2
Turnout		1,497	65.7	+4.7
Labour gain from Progressive				

Kenneth Mackay (Progressive) had been elected in 1898, however, he was appointed to the Legislative Council and Niels Nielsen (Labour) won the seat at the by-election.

=== Elections in the 1890s ===
==== 1899 by-election ====
1899 Boorowa by-election Saturday 10 November
Party	Candidate	Votes	%	±%
Labour	Niels Nielsen (elected)	539	53.0	+15.2
Protectionist	George Waddell	478	47.0	−15.2
Total formal votes		1,017	97.8	−0.9
Informal votes		23	2.2	+0.9
Turnout		1,040	45.6	−15.4
Labour gain from Protectionist		Swing	+15.2	

Kenneth Mackay (Protectionist) resigned to accept an appointment to the Legislative Council.

==== 1898 ====
1898 New South Wales colonial election: Boorowa
Party	Candidate	Votes	%	±%
National Federal	Kenneth Mackay	783	62.2	
Labour	James Toomey	475	37.8	
Total formal votes		1,258	98.7	
Informal votes		17	1.3	
Turnout		1,275	61.0	
National Federal hold				

==== 1895 ====
1895 New South Wales colonial election: Boorowa
Party	Candidate	Votes	%	±%
Protectionist	Kenneth Mackay	727	55.0	
Labour	James Wilson	590	44.6	
Independent	Robert Horne	5	0.4	
Total formal votes		1,322	98.1	
Informal votes		26	1.9	
Turnout		1,348	72.8	
Protectionist hold				

==== 1895 by-election ====
1895 Boorowa by-election Thursday 24 January
Party	Candidate	Votes	%	±%
Protectionist	Kenneth Mackay (elected)	746	53.6	-
Labour	James Toomey	647	46.4	-
Total formal votes		1,393	99.2	+1.6
Informal votes		11	0.8	−1.6
Turnout		1,404	76.2 (Note: Estimate based on a roll of 1,842 at the July 1894 election.)	−3.9
Protectionist hold				

Thomas Slattery (Protectionist) resigned.

==== 1894 ====
1894 New South Wales colonial election: Boorowa
Party	Candidate	Votes	%	±%
Protectionist	Thomas Slattery	773	53.6	
Labour	James Toomey	668	46.4	
Total formal votes		1,441	97.6	
Informal votes		35	2.4	
Turnout		1,476	80.1	
Protectionist hold				

==== 1891 ====
1891 New South Wales colonial election: Boorowa Wednesday 24 June
Party	Candidate	Votes	%	±%
Protectionist	Thomas Slattery (re-elected)	509	66.0	
Free Trade	Albert Middleton	245	31.8	
Protectionist	Malcolm Burns	17	2.2	
Total formal votes		771	98.2	
Informal votes		14	1.8	
Turnout		785	63.2	
Protectionist hold				

=== Elections in the 1880s ===
==== 1889 ====
1889 New South Wales colonial election: Boorowa Tuesday 29 January
Party	Candidate	Votes	%	±%
Protectionist	Thomas Slattery (elected)	unopposed		
Protectionist hold				

==== 1887 ====
1887 New South Wales colonial election: Boorowa Monday 7 February
Party	Candidate	Votes	%	±%
Protectionist	Thomas Slattery (re-elected)	unopposed		

==== 1885 ====
1885 New South Wales colonial election: Boorowa Monday 19 October
Candidate	Votes	%
Thomas Slattery (re-elected)	446	75.0
Argyle McCallum	149	25.0
Total formal votes	595	97.2
Informal votes	17	2.8
Turnout	612	55.3

==== 1882 ====
1882 New South Wales colonial election: Boorowa Wednesday 13 December
Candidate	Votes	%
Thomas Slattery (re-elected)	unopposed	

==== 1880 ====
1880 New South Wales colonial election: Boorowa Monday 29 November
Candidate	Votes	%
Thomas Slattery (elected)	456	63.9
Albert Middleton	258	36.1
Total formal votes	714	97.7
Informal votes	17	2.3
Turnout	731	52.7
	(new seat)	
