= Ardill =

Ardill may refer to:

== People ==
- Austin Ardill (1917–2010), Northern Irish unionist politician
- George Ardill (1889–1964), Australian politician
- John Ardill, Irish Anglican priest
- Katie Ardill (1886–1955), Australian medical doctor
- Louisa Ardill (1853-1920), British-born Australian temperance leader, suffragist, and city missionary
- Len Ardill (1931–2014), Australian politician

== Places ==
- Ardill, Saskatchewan, Canada

== See also ==
- Ardell
