= 1895 Boorowa colonial by-election =

By-election in New South Wales, Australia

- 24 January 1895

Electoral district of Boorowa in the Legislative Assembly of New South Wales
- Turnout: 76.2% (▼3.9%)
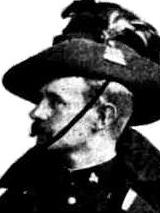
	First party	Second party
		ALP
Candidate	Kenneth Mackay	James Toomey
Party	Protectionist	Labor
Popular vote	746	647
Percentage	53.6%	46.5%
MLA before election
Thomas Slattery
Protectionist
Elected MLA
Kenneth Mackay
Protectionist

A by-election for the seat of Boorowa in the New South Wales Legislative Assembly was held on 24 January 1895 because Thomas Slattery (Protectionist) resigned to concentrate on his legal practice.

== Dates ==
Date	Event
1 January 1895	Thomas Slattery resigned.
2 January 1895	Writ of election issued by the Speaker of the Legislative Assembly.
15 January 1895	Day of nomination
24 January 1895	Polling day
20 February 1895	Return of writ

== Result ==
1895 Boorowa by-election Thursday 24 January
Party	Candidate	Votes	%	±%
Protectionist	Kenneth Mackay (elected)	746	53.6	-
Labour	James Toomey	647	46.4	-
Total formal votes		1,393	99.2	+1.6
Informal votes		11	0.8	−1.6
Turnout		1,404	76.2 (Note: Estimate based on a roll of 1,842 at the July 1894 election.)	−3.9
Protectionist hold				

== See also ==
- Electoral results for the district of Boorowa
- List of New South Wales state by-elections
