= 1886 Yass Plains colonial by-election =

By-election in New South Wales, Australia

A by-election was held for the New South Wales Legislative Assembly electorate of Yass Plains on 20 December 1886 because of the resignation of Louis Heydon.

== Dates ==
Date	Event
29 November 1886	Louis Heydon resigned.
2 December 1886	Writ of election issued by the Speaker of the Legislative Assembly.
15 December 1886	Nominations
20 December 1886	Polling day
10 January 1887	Return of writ

== Candidates ==
- Thomas Colls was a long time resident of the district, having been a hotel proprietor before his retirement in 1879, an alderman on the council of the Municipality of Yass and former Mayor of Yass. This was the first occasion in which he stood for parliament.
- Richard Colonna-Close was a barrister in Sydney who had stood unsuccessfully for Yass Plains at the election in 1885,

== Result ==
1886 Yass Plains by-election Monday 20 December
Candidate	Votes	%
Thomas Colls (elected)	603	54.2
Richard Colonna-Close	509	45.8
Total formal votes	1,112	100.0
Informal votes	0	0.0
Turnout	1,112	57.0

== See also ==
- Electoral results for the district of Yass Plains
- List of New South Wales state by-elections
