= 1866 Yass Plains colonial by-election =

By-election in New South Wales, Australia

A by-election was held for the New South Wales Legislative Assembly electorate of Yass Plains on 8 February 1866 because Robert Isaacs had been appointed Solicitor General in the second Martin ministry. Such ministerial by-elections were usually uncontested however on this occasion a poll was required in Patrick's Plains (Bowie Wilson) and Yass Plains. Both ministers were comfortably re-elected with more than 70% of the vote. The other ministers James Martin (The Lachlan), Henry Parkes (Kiama), James Byrnes (Parramatta) and Geoffrey Eagar (West Sydney) were re-elected unopposed.

Robert Ross campaigned for free trade and free selection before survey and had been unsuccessful in three previous elections, for Cumberland Boroughs in 1856, Windsor in 1859 and The Hastings in 1860. This was the final occasion on which he stood for parliament.

== Dates ==
Date	Event
22 January 1866	Second Martin ministry appointed.
23 January 1866	Writ of election issued by the Speaker of the Legislative Assembly.
5 February 1866	Nominations at Yass.
8 February 1866	Polling day
17 February 1866	Return of writ

== Result ==
1866 Yass Plains by-election Thursday 8 February
Candidate	Votes	%
Robert Isaacs (re-elected)	406	71.6
Robert Ross	161	28.4
Total formal votes	567	100.0
Informal votes	0	0.0
Turnout	567	46.6

== See also ==
- Electoral results for the district of Yass Plains
- List of New South Wales state by-elections
