= 1878 Yass Plains colonial by-election =

By-election in New South Wales, Australia

A by-election was held for the New South Wales Legislative Assembly electorate of Yass Plains on 2 January 1878 because Michael Fitzpatrick was appointed Colonial Secretary in the Farnell ministry. Such ministerial by-elections were usually uncontested and on this occasion the six other ministers were re-elected unopposed.

== Dates ==
Date	Event
31 October 1877	Michael Fitzpatrick re-elected for Yass Plains.
18 December 1877	Michael Fitzpatrick appointed Colonial Secretary.
19 December 1877	Writ of election issued by the Governor.
28 December 1877	Nominations
2 January 1878	Polling day
18 January 1878	Return of writ

== Result ==
1878 Yass Plains by-election Wednesday 2 January
Candidate	Votes	%
Michael Fitzpatrick (re-elected)	290	92.9
Arthur Remmington	22	7.1
Total formal votes	312	98.7
Informal votes	4	1.3
Turnout	316	18.2

== See also ==
- Electoral results for the district of Yass Plains
- List of New South Wales state by-elections
