= 1861 Patrick's Plains colonial by-election =

By-election in New South Wales, Australia

A by-election was held for the New South Wales Legislative Assembly electorate of Patrick's Plains on 4 July 1861 because of the resignation of William Lesley.

== Dates ==
Date	Event
5 June 1861	William Lesley resigned.
12 June 1861	Writ of election issued by the Speaker of the Legislative Assembly.
4 July 1861	Nominations
8 July 1861	Polling day
20 July 1861	Return of writ

== Result ==
1861 Patrick's Plains by-election Thursday 4 July
Candidate	Votes	%
Joseph Harpur (elected)	unopposed	

== See also ==
- Electoral results for the district of Patrick's Plains
- List of New South Wales state by-elections
