= 1866 Patrick's Plains colonial by-election =

By-election in New South Wales, Australia

A by-election was held for the New South Wales Legislative Assembly electorate of Patrick's Plains on 8 February 1866 because Bowie Wilson had been appointed Secretary for Lands in the second Martin ministry. Such ministerial by-elections were usually uncontested however on this occasion a poll was required in Patrick's Plains and Yass Plains (Robert Isaacs). Both ministers were comfortably re-elected with more than 70% of the vote. The other ministers James Martin (The Lachlan), Henry Parkes (Kiama), James Byrnes (Parramatta) and Geoffrey Eagar (West Sydney) were re-elected unopposed.

Mr E E Darvall was a bank clerk, the son of John Darvall, the former attorney general. This was the only occasion on which he stood for parliament.

John Heuston was a burlesque candidate, apparently winning a £10 bet for nominating, but withdrew before the poll.

== Dates ==
Date	Event
22 January 1866	Second Martin ministry appointed.
23 January 1866	Writ of election issued by the Speaker of the Legislative Assembly.
5 February 1866	Nominations at Singleton.
8 February 1866	Polling day.
17 February 1866	Return of writ

== Polling places ==
- Singleton
- Belford
- Camberwell
- Warkworth
- Jerry's Plains
- Broke

== Result ==
1866 Patrick's Plains by-election Thursday 8 February
Candidate	Votes	%
Bowie Wilson (re-elected)	339	70.5
E E Darvall	142	29.5
Total formal votes	481	100.0
Informal votes	0	0.0
Turnout	481	29.4

== See also ==
- Electoral results for the district of Patrick's Plains
- List of New South Wales state by-elections
