= 1882 Yass Plains colonial by-election =

By-election in New South Wales, Australia

A by-election was held for the New South Wales Legislative Assembly electorate of Yass Plains on 10 January 1882 because of the death of Michael Fitzpatrick.

== Dates ==
| Date | Event |
|---|---|
| 10 December 1881 | Michael Fitzpatrick died. |
| 14 December 1882 | Writ of election issued by the Speaker of the Legislative Assembly. |
| 4 January 1882 | Nominations |
| 10 January 1882 | Polling day |
| 24 January 1882 | Return of writ |

== Candidates ==
- Dr Allan Campbell was a local surgeon. This was his only candidacy for the Legislative Assembly.
- Louis Heydon was a solicitor from Sydney who had been defeated at the Argyle by-election in December 1881.

== Result ==
1882 Yass Plains by-election Tuesday 10 January
| Candidate | Votes | % |
|---|---|---|
| Louis Heydon (elected) | 674 | 53.7 |
| Allan Campbell | 580 | 46.3 |
| Total formal votes | 1,254 | 97.2 |
| Informal votes | 36 | 2.8 |
| Turnout | 1,290 | 68.2 |

== See also ==
- Electoral results for the district of Yass Plains
- List of New South Wales state by-elections
