= 1861 Yass Plains colonial by-election =

By-election in New South Wales, Australia

A by-election was held for the New South Wales Legislative Assembly electorate of Yass Plains on 15 August 1861 because of the resignation of Henry O'Brien due to ill health.

== Dates ==
Date	Event
16 July 1861	Henry O'Brien resigned.
25 July 1861	Writ of election issued by the Speaker of the Legislative Assembly.
15 August 1861	Nominations
22 August 1861	Polling day
2 September 1861	Return of writ

== Result ==
1861 Yass Plains by-election Thursday 15 August
Candidate	Votes	%
Peter Faucett (elected)	unopposed	

== See also ==
- Electoral results for the district of Yass Plains
- List of New South Wales state by-elections
