= 1865 Yass Plains colonial by-election =

By-election in New South Wales, Australia

A by-election was held for the New South Wales Legislative Assembly electorate of Yass Plains on 6 November 1865 because Peter Faucett accepted an appointment as a judge of the Supreme Court.

== Dates ==
Date	Event
6 October 1865	Peter Faucett sworn in as a judge of the Supreme Court.
24 October 1865	Peter Faucett's seat was declared vacant.
25 October 1865	Writ of election issued by the Speaker of the Legislative Assembly.
6 November 1865	Nominations
9 November 1865	Polling day
16 November 1865	Return of writ

== Result ==
1865 Yass Plains by-election Monday 6 November
Candidate	Votes	%
Robert Isaacs (elected)	unopposed	

== See also ==
- Electoral results for the district of Yass Plains
- List of New South Wales state by-elections
