= 1913 Yass state by-election =

Election result for Yass, New South Wales, Australia

A by-election was held for the New South Wales Legislative Assembly electorate of Yass on 5 March 1913 because of the resignation of Niels Nielsen (Labor). Nielsen was the Secretary for Lands in the McGowen ministry, and drafted legislation to repeal the Land Conversion Act consistent with Labor policy, however this proved to be controversial, with extensive division in the Labor Party, resulting in Bill Dunn and Henry Hoyle resigning from parliament in July 1911, removing Labor's slim majority in the Legislative Assembly. Caucus dropped his legislation and Nielsen resigned from the ministry on 1 August 1911. Unable to regain ministerial office, he resigned his seat in 1913 as part of a party deal that saw him appointed New South Wales trade commissioner in San Francisco.

== Dates ==
Date	Event
4 February 1913	Niels Nielsen resigned.
5 February 1913	Writ of election issued by the Speaker of the Legislative Assembly.
12 February 1913	Nominations
5 March 1913	Polling day
31 March 1913	Return of writ

== Result ==
1913 Yass by-election Wednesday 5 March
Party	Candidate	Votes	%	±%
Labor	Greg McGirr	2,972	50.3	−3.2
Liberal Reform	Patrick Bourke	2,931	49.7	+3.2
Total formal votes		5,903	100.0	+1.4
Informal votes		0	0.0	−1.4
Turnout		5,903	73.8 (Note: Estimate based on a roll of 8,001 at the 1910 election.)	+0.1
Labor hold		Swing	−3.2	

== See also ==
- Electoral results for the district of Yass
- List of New South Wales state by-elections
