= 1899 Boorowa colonial by-election =

Election result for Boorowa, New South Wales, Australia

A by-election was held for the New South Wales Legislative Assembly electorate of Boorowa on 30 September 1899 because Kenneth Mackay (Protectionist) resigned to accept an appointment to the Legislative Council.

== Dates ==
Date	Event
15 September 1899	Kenneth Mackay resigned from the Legislative Assembly.
16 September 1899	Writ of election issued by the Speaker of the Legislative Assembly.
23 September 1899	Nominations
30 September 1899	Polling day
9 October 1899	Return of writ

== Result ==
1899 Boorowa by-election Saturday 10 November
Party	Candidate	Votes	%	±%
Labour	Niels Nielsen (elected)	539	53.0	+15.2
Protectionist	George Waddell	478	47.0	−15.2
Total formal votes		1,017	97.8	−0.9
Informal votes		23	2.2	+0.9
Turnout		1,040	45.6	−15.4
Labour gain from Protectionist		Swing	+15.2	

== See also ==
- Electoral results for the district of Boorowa
- List of New South Wales state by-elections
