= Richard Colonna-Close =

English teacher and clergyman (1836–1905)

Richard Colonna-Close (1836–1905) was a teacher, clergyman, lawyer and politician in England and Australia.

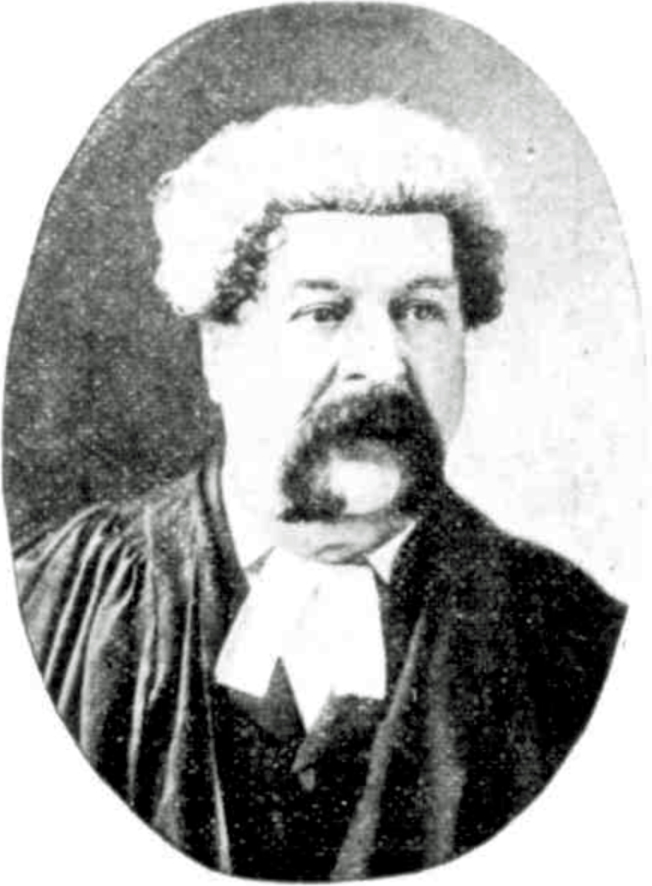
Richard Colonna-Close

He was born in 1836 as Richard Close, the son of Richard Backhouse Close of Hexham, Northumberland. A condition of an inheritance led to him adopting, from 1879, the maiden name of his maternal grandmother, in addition to his own surname. He thereafter styled himself "Richard Colonna-Close".

In 1851, he was recorded as an apprentice to an attorney and, in 1855, he became an ensign in the Northumberland Light Infantry Regiment of Militia. He resigned his commission as a lieutenant in the Regiment in 1859.

While travelling in Europe, he spent some time in Oldenberg where he came under the protection and patronage of Peter II, Grand Duke of Oldenburg, who had family connections with the Russian royal family. In 1859, he obtained an appointment as a Professor of the English language in the University of St Petersburg. He reported that he was presented with the 13th rank of Russian nobility, accompanied by a coat-of-arms. He also acted as English tutor to three of the younger sons of Tsar Alexander II who were to become Tsar Alexander III and the Grand Dukes Vladimir and Sergius.

Having returned to England, he was made a deacon in the Church of England by the Bishop of Manchester in 1866 and was ordained priest in the Diocese of Exeter in 1870. In the ten-year period 1866 to 1875 he served curacies in a variety of parishes and chapels, including St Mary Preston (Lancashire) in the Diocese of Manchester; Plumstead, Greenwich, in the Diocese of Rochester – where he had "sole charge" of the chapel of the Royal Artillery garrison at Woolwich; Bampton (Devon), where he was minister at a chapel of ease in the hamlet of Petton; Pelton in the Diocese of Durham; Nuffield in the Diocese of Oxford; and Buckhorn Weston (Dorcetshire).

In 1870 he married Prudence Elizabeth Gray Isaac at St Margaret, Plumstead, Greenwich. Between 1871 and 1878 they had five children: four girls and one boy.

Close enrolled at St Edmund's Hall, Oxford in 1872. However, despite later claims that he held a Master of Arts from Oxford University he did not proceed to graduation. He was appointed headmaster of Woodstock Grammar School in January 1875, but resigned in the first half of the next year.

In 1876, he was officiating in churches at Chinnor and Begbroke in Oxfordshire, when he was found guilty, at the Oxford Assizes, of indecently assaulting a 14-year-old girl. The sentencing judge noted that it was a premeditated attempt to inveigle the victim to his own home to seduce her, but the absence of extreme violence made it a "medium case". Close was sentenced to 12 months’ imprisonment with hard labour.

After his release from gaol, Close emigrated to Australia. His family did not join him. His son Richard Bevill Middleton Close (1878–1948) was born at Ealing on 24 April 1878, after Close's arrival in Australia. The younger Richard, like his father, became a priest in the Church of England.

In Australia, in February 1878, Close started as Incumbent of Toowong in the Diocese of Brisbane, Queensland. However, he soon lost the confidence of his parishioners and "charges against his moral character" began circulating in the parish. At one parish meeting, held in March 1879, a note from Close was delivered by an intermediary stating: "The Rev. Mr. Close presents his compliments to the gentlemen present, and requests me to inform them that should any among them say anything slanderous of him, he, the Rev. Mr. Close, will horsewhip that individual when ever he may meet him, even though it be in Queen-street." By the end of April 1879, he was reduced to advertising a Church of England service in the Temperance Hall in Edward Street.

Moving to Melbourne, he commenced studying law and, in 1881, became the editor of "The Federated Australian" which claimed to be "a weekly summary of the pastoral, agricultural, political, social, scientific and sporting affairs of the whole of Australia".

An application for admission as a student at law in New South Wales in 1880 was refused because he had not passed two examinations in any faculty at the University of Sydney. This was notwithstanding that he had passed the first two years of the Bachelor of Laws course at the University of Melbourne – a course which Sydney did not yet offer. The history of the New South Wales Bar describes him as "a flowery orator with an eccentric taste in clothes".

He was finally admitted to the bar in Sydney in 1882. At the time it was noted that he had "made himself prominent in the legal and literary circles of most portions of the old world, and commenced a new career in the new with credentials of superlative character". He was disbarred at his own request so he could be admitted as a solicitor in 1899, but he was readmitted to the bar again in 1900.

From around 1884 until 1895 he lived in relative isolation on the cliffs near Coogee in a residence called "Point Colonna" near what is now Close Street, South Coogee.

In politics Close was an unsuccessful candidate for several seats in the New South Wales Legislative Assembly: for the electorate of Yass Plains in 1885, and 1886; for Randwick in 1894; and Leichhardt in 1898. He also unsuccessfully contested a seat in the first Australian Senate election in 1901. His political interests included the Women's Liberal League, Australian Federation and old-age pensions.

He was said to be a friend of Sir Henry Parkes. In jovial company, Sir Henry often insisted on the telling of a story about Close's courtroom oratory: At the Bathurst Court House, Close had exhorted the jury to acquit his client, painting a picture of his loving father and devoted mother seated together in their little English cottage oblivious to his plight. The client was found guilty and Judge Josephson observed in sentencing that he would not have far to go in finding his loving father and devoted mother, since they were serving the latter part of their sentences in the Bathurst Gaol only a few yards away.

Close died suddenly after a heart attack in his Paddington home on 27 September 1905. He was buried in the Randwick General Cemetery in Coogee.
