= 1860 East Sydney colonial by-election =

By-election in New South Wales, Australia

A by-election was held for the New South Wales Legislative Assembly electorate of East Sydney on 20 January 1860 because Charles Cowper had resigned from parliament on 26 October 1859, but was re-elected at the resulting by-election, having been nominated without his consent.

== Dates ==
Date	Event
27 October 1859	Charles Cowper resigned from parliament.
10 November 1859	Charles Cowper re-elected.
17 November 1859	Charles Cowper resigned from Parliament, again.
9 January 1860	Writ of election issued by the Speaker of the Legislative Assembly.
18 January 1860	Nominations.
20 January 1860	Polling day
24 January 1860	Return of writ

== Candidates ==
- Peter Faucett was a barrister and former member of the Legislative Assembly. He had received the most votes of the unsuccessful candidates at the 1859 East Sydney by-election.
- Robert Stewart was cabinetmaker and undertaking who was nominated by the Reverend John Lang. He had received the most votes of the unsuccessful candidates at the 1859 West Sydney election.
- John West was the conservative editor of the Sydney Morning Herald. Antony Green described his nomination as a joke on the hustings. The Empire gave a detailed account of the nomination of Reverend West, while the Sydney Morning Herald reported that the nominator had spoken in a "facetious strain for some minutes".

== Result ==
1860 East Sydney by-election Thursday 10 November
Candidate	Votes	%
Peter Faucett (elected)	1,346	50.3
Robert Stewart	1,315	49.2
John West	14	0.5
Total formal votes	2,675	100.0
Informal votes	0	0.0
Turnout	2,675	30.0

== See also ==
- Electoral results for the district of East Sydney
- List of New South Wales state by-elections
