= 1859 East Sydney colonial by-election =

By-election in New South Wales, Australia

A by-election was held for the New South Wales Legislative Assembly electorate of East Sydney on 10 November 1859 because the Cowper government was defeated, causing Charles Cowper to resign his commission as Premier and Colonial Secretary and he resigned from parliament the following day. The second vacancy was caused because John Black had been appointed Secretary for Lands in the new Forster ministry,

== Dates ==
Date	Event
26 October 1859	Charles Cowper resigned as Premier and Colonial Secretary.
27 October 1859	Charles Cowper resigned from parliament,
27 October 1859	John Black appointed Secretary for Lands.
27 October 1859	Writs of election issued by the Speaker of the Legislative Assembly.
8 November 1859	Nominations
10 November 1859	Polling day
15 November 1859	Return of writ

== Result ==
1859 East Sydney by-election Thursday 10 November
Candidate	Votes	%
Charles Cowper (re-elected 1)	1,282	28.2
John Black (re-elected 2)	1,237	27.2
Peter Faucett	1,000	22.0
Richard Driver	969	21.3
Thomas Duigan	56	1.2
Total formal votes	4,544	100.0
Informal votes	0	0.0
Turnout	2,272	30.0

== Aftermath ==
Charles Cowper was nominated in his absence and resigned after the election, resulting in the 1860 by-election, won by Peter Faucett.

== See also ==
- Electoral results for the district of East Sydney
- List of New South Wales state by-elections
