= Joseph Harpur =

Australian politician

Joseph Jehosephat Harpur (1810 – 2 May 1878) was an Australian politician.

Harpur was born in 1810 in the Hunter River district of New South Wales to Joseph Harpur and Sarah née Chidley. His father was originally from Kinsale, County Cork, Ireland, and was parish clerk and master of the Windsor district school while his mother was from Somerset. Both had been transported. One of his brothers was the poet Charles Harpur.

He was a public servant and clerk, and active in radical and temperance movements. In 1861 he was elected to the New South Wales Legislative Assembly for Patrick's Plains at a by-election, but he did not re-contest in 1864.

Harpur died in Sydney in 1878 (aged 67–68).

New South Wales Legislative Assembly
Preceded by William Lesley	Member for Patrick's Plains; 1861–1864	Succeeded by Bowie Wilson
