= Martin ministry (1866–1868) =

Second Martin ministry
- 10th Cabinet of the Colony of New South Wales

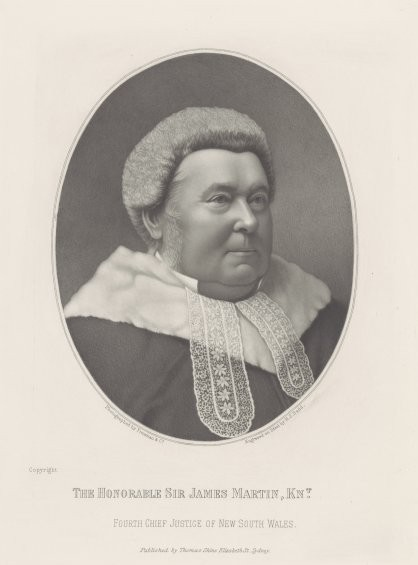
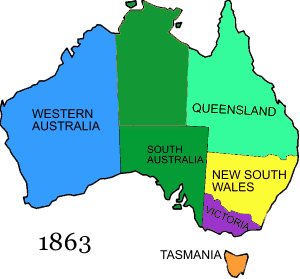
- Premier James Martin and the Colony of New South Wales (1863–1900)
- Date formed: 22 January 1866
- Date dissolved: 26 October 1868

People and organisations
- Monarch: Queen Victoria
- Governor: Sir John Young / The Earl Belmore
- Head of government: James Martin
- No. of ministers: 9
- Member party: unaligned
- Status in legislature: Minority government
- Opposition party: unaligned
- Opposition leader: Charles Cowper; John Robertson

History
- Predecessor: Fourth Cowper ministry
- Successor: Second Robertson ministry

The second Martin ministry was the tenth ministry of the Colony of New South Wales, and second of three occasions of being led by James Martin QC.

Martin was elected in the first free elections for the New South Wales Legislative Assembly held in 1856. He came to power as Premier on the first occasion after he defeated Charles Cowper's government fell in October 1863. Martin was asked to form government on the second occasion, this time in coalition with his former rival, Henry Parkes, after Cowper again lost the confidence of the Assembly in December 1865.

The title of Premier was widely used to refer to the Leader of Government, but not enshrined in formal use until 1920.

There was no party system in New South Wales politics until 1887. Under the constitution, ministers were required to resign to recontest their seats in a by-election when appointed. Such ministerial by-elections were usually uncontested and each of James Martin (The Lachlan), Henry Parkes (Kiama), James Byrnes (Parramatta) and Geoffrey Eagar (West Sydney) were re-elected unopposed. A poll was required in Patrick's Plains (Bowie Wilson) and Yass Plains (Robert Isaacs) however both ministers were comfortably re-elected with more than 70% of the vote.

This ministry covers the period from 22 January 1866 until 26 October 1868, when Martin resigned.

== Composition of ministry ==
Portfolio	Minister	Term start	Term end	Term length
Premier; Attorney-General	James Martin	22 January 1866	26 October 1868	2 years, 278 days
Colonial Secretary	Henry Parkes	22 January 1866	17 September 1868	2 years, 239 days
Colonial Secretary	Joseph Docker MLC	28 September 1868	26 October 1868	28 days
Representative of the Government in the Legislative Council	Joseph Docker MLC	22 January 1866	26 October 1868	2 years, 278 days
Colonial Treasurer	Geoffrey Eagar	22 January 1866	26 October 1868	2 years, 278 days
Secretary for Lands	Bowie Wilson	22 January 1866	26 October 1868	2 years, 278 days
Secretary for Public Works	James Byrnes	22 January 1866	26 October 1868	2 years, 278 days
Solicitor General	Robert Isaacs	22 January 1866	26 October 1868	2 years, 278 days
Postmaster-General	Joseph Docker MLC	22 January 1866	27 September 1868	2 years, 249 days
Postmaster-General	Atkinson Tighe	29 September 1868	26 October 1868	27 days

Ministers are members of the Legislative Assembly unless otherwise noted.

== See also ==
- Self-government in New South Wales
- Members of the New South Wales Legislative Assembly, 1864–1869
- First Martin ministry (1863–1865)
- Third Martin ministry (1870–1872)

Preceded by Fourth Cowper ministry	Second Martin ministry 1866–1868	Succeeded by Second Robertson ministry
