= Louisa Ardill =

(1853–1920), evangelist, matron and social worker

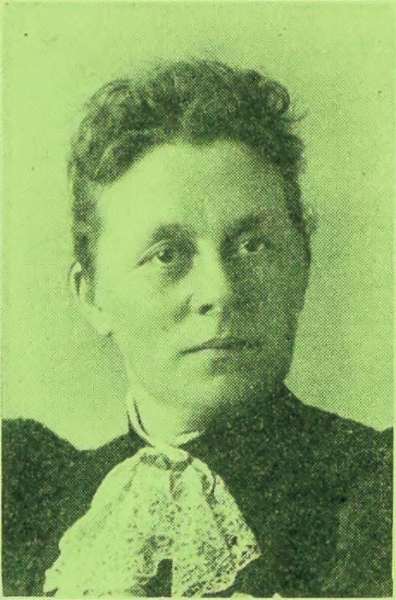
- Ardill, pictured in the Standard Encyclopedia of the Alcohol Problem (1925)
- Born: Louisa Wales; 13 May 1853; Marylebone, London, England
- Died: 16 July 1920 (aged 67); Newtown, New South Wales
- Resting place: Waverley Cemetery
- Occupations: Evangelist, temperance and suffrage campaigner, hospital matron
- Organization: Woman's Christian Temperance Union
- Spouse: George Edward Ardill (m. 1885)
- Children: 2, including Katie Ardill

Louisa Ardill (née Wales; 1853–1920) was a British-born Australian temperance and suffrage leader, and a city missionary. An active worker in Christian, temperance, and philanthropic work, Ardill was for a long time identified with the Woman's Christian Temperance Union (WCTU), serving as superintendent of the Australian Commonwealth's Suffrage and Political department.

== Biography ==
Louisa Wales was born in Marylebone, London, England, on May 13, 1853. She was the eldest daughter of Thomas Wales, who moved to Petersham, New South Wales.

Early on, she became enlisted among the workers and speakers in the temperance cause, and before coming to Australia, she was active in evangelistic work. In 1885, she emigrated to Australia and settled in Sydney. Prior to her marriage, she conducted a large number of missions in New South Wales.

Uniting with the WCTU on its first organization in Australia, she was assigned to the Suffrage and Political department for the New South Wales WCTU. Her title in 1901 was State Superintendent of Legislation and Woman's Franchise. Later, she was elected superintendent of this department for the entire Australian Commonwealth. She developed marked efficiency in this line of endeavor, while greatly assisting her husband in his humanitarian and evangelistic movements in Sydney.

Ardill served as matron-superintendent of the Home of Hope hospital which was eventually renamed the South Sydney Women's hospital. In 1895, in Sydney, Mr. and Mrs. Ardill conducted Evangelistic Services at Woodloch's Circus Tent. In 1901, she visited England and Canada, lecturing on temperance in many of the cities, and seeking to inaugurate and further such movements as her husband had founded in Australia.

== Personal life ==
She married George Edward Ardlll on 8 September 1885 at the Baptist Church, Bathurst Street, Sydney, who, at the time, was president of the Blue Ribbon Gospel Army. Later, he founded the Sydney Rescue Society and other similar benevolent movements. They had two children, Katie Louisa Ardill (1886–1955) who was born on 3 August 1886 at Knox Street, and George Edward Ardill (1889–1964) who was born on 18 October 1889 at Darlinghurst. Katie attended Wellesley College, and the University of Sydney and became a medical doctor; she served in World War I and was a surgeon. George was educated at Stanmore Public School and Newington College.

Louisa Wales Ardill died July 16/17, 1920, in Newtown, New South Wales, after a prolonged illness and was buried at Sydney's Waverley Cemetery.
