= St Mary's Church, Preston =

Coordinates: 53.7616°N 2.6867°W

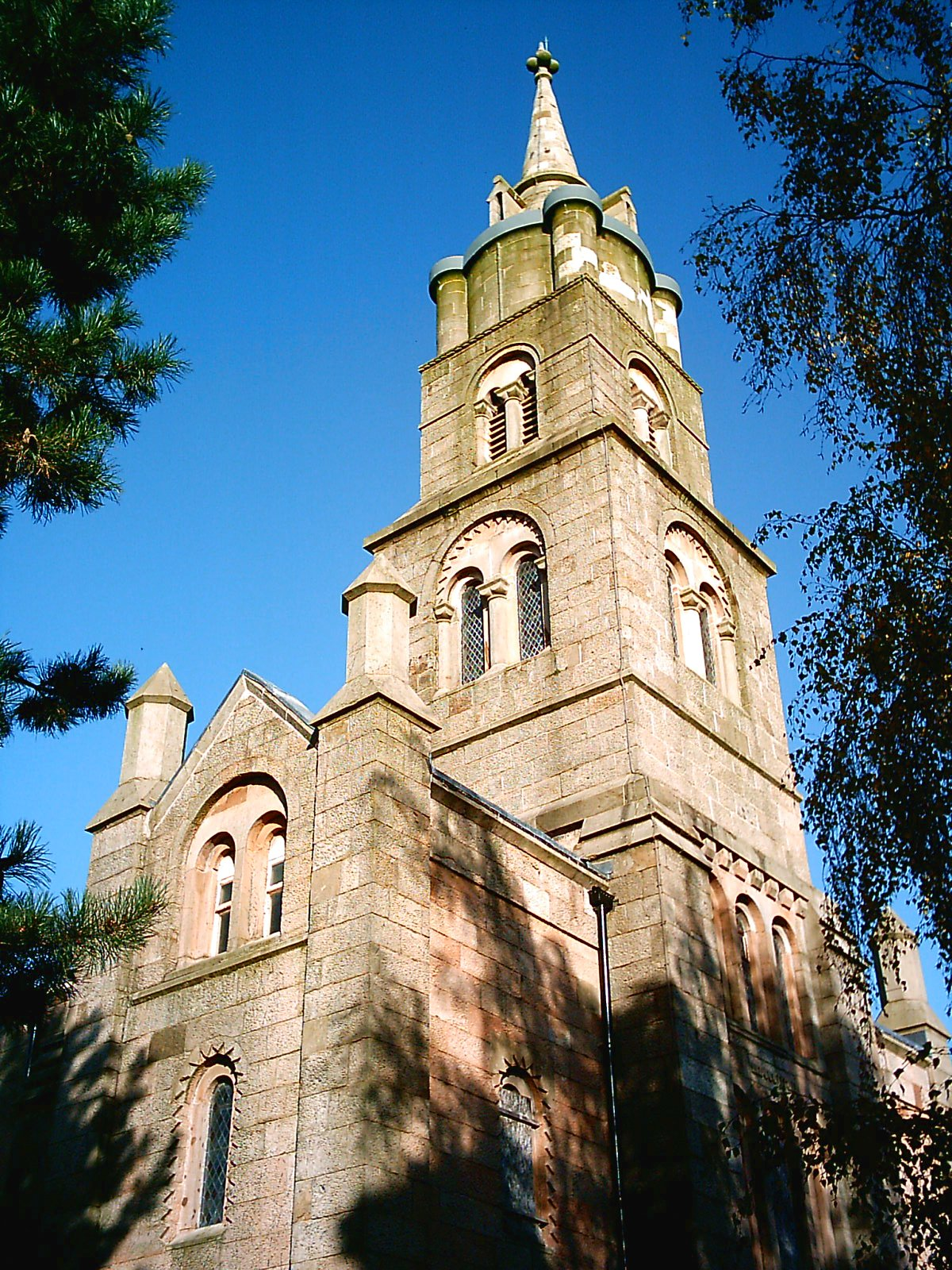

- Location in Preston St Mary's Church, Preston (Lancashire) St Mary's Church, Preston (England)
- OS grid reference: SD 549 297
- Location: St Mary's Street, Preston, Lancashire
- Country: England
- Denomination: Anglican

History
- Status: Former parish church

Architecture
- Functional status: redundant
- Heritage designation: Grade II
- Designated: 27 September 1979
- Architect(s): John Latham, E. H. Shellard
- Architectural type: Church
- Style: Romanesque Revival
- Groundbreaking: 1836
- Completed: 1838

Specifications
- Materials: Sandstone, slate roof

St Mary's Church is in St Mary's Street, Preston, Lancashire, England. It is a redundant Anglican parish church, and was converted into a conservation centre in 2006. The church is recorded in the National Heritage List for England as a designated Grade II listed building.

== History ==
St Mary's was built to accommodate the increasing population of the town in the early 19th century. Building began in May 1836 and the church opened in 1838. The church was designed by John Latham, (Note: John Latham designed a number of churches in Preston and the surrounding area. His style is described by Hartwell and Pevsner as being "idiosyncratic".) and was extended in a matching style with the addition of transepts and a chancel in 1852–56 by E. H. Shellard. The church was declared redundant by the diocese of Blackburn on 1 March 1996, and was converted into a conservation centre for the Museum of Lancashire in 2006.

== Architecture ==
The church is constructed in sandstone and has a slate roof. It is orientated in a north–south axis and is in Romanesque Revival style. The plan consists of a five-bay nave, east and west transepts, and a chancel. All the windows are round-headed. At the south end of the church is a tower flanked by wings. The tower is in four stages, the bottom stage being in three storeys. The lowest of these storeys contains a round-headed doorway with three orders of moulding. Both of the upper storeys contain a three-light window. Each of the three upper stages is set back, with two-light bell openings in the second and third stages. The top stage consists of a drum with corner cylinders, on which is a needle spire with lucarnes. The wings flanking the tower are of a similar height to its first stage. Both have round-headed doorways with a window above, and clasping pilasters, the outer one surmounted by squat pinnacles. The east and west sides of the wings are gabled. Along the sides of the nave the windows are set in round-headed arches, and the bays are divided by pilasters. The transepts also have clasping pilasters, and at the corners these rise to two-stage turrets containing blind arcading and topped by pyramidal caps. The chancel contains three lancet windows, with a circular window above.

== External features ==
The gates, gate piers, and the walls surrounding the churchyard are also listed at Grade II. The walls and gate piers are in sandstone. The piers have a square plan, with panelled sides, and have plain caps with pyramidal tops. The walls form a boundary on the east and south sides of the churchyard, and incorporate twelve piers similar in style to the gate piers. The gates are ramped, their railings having spear heads. There are matching railings on a section of the wall, but the other railings were replaced in the 20th century.

== Appraisal ==
The church was designated as a Grade II listed building on 27 September 1979, and the gates, gate piers and walls on 20 December 1991. Grade II is the lowest of the three grades of listing and is applied to "buildings of national importance and special interest". Hartwell and Pevsner in the Buildings of England series comment that the outline of the church "seems to owe a debt to the pinnacles at the west end of Tewkesbury Abbey" and that the massing of the architectural details is "reminiscent" of works by Christopher Wren and Nicholas Hawksmoor.

== See also ==
- Listed buildings in Preston, Lancashire

== Notes and references ==
Notes

Citations

Sources

- Hartwell, Clare; Pevsner, Nikolaus (2009) [1969], Lancashire: North, The Buildings of England, New Haven and London: Yale University Press, ISBN 978-0-300-12667-9
