= William Browne (New South Wales politician) =

Australian politician

William Charles Browne (26 July 1842 – 12 June 1916) was an Australian politician.

He was born at Singleton to grazier John Browne and Elizabeth Alcorn. He became a grazier at Singleton, and also obtained a Bachelor of Arts from the University of Sydney in 1864. On 12 December 1866 he married Jessie Campbell MacTaggart, with whom he had eight children. In 1872 he was elected to the New South Wales Legislative Assembly for Patrick's Plains, serving until his defeat in 1880. Browne died at Manly in 1916.

New South Wales Legislative Assembly
Preceded by James Hoskins	Member for Patrick's Plains; 1872–1880	Succeeded by John Brown
