= John Brown (New South Wales politician) =

Australian politician

Member of the New South Wales Legislative Assembly for Patrick's Plains
- In office 1880–1882
- Preceded by: William Browne
- Succeeded by: Albert Gould

Personal details
- Born: December 13, 1821 Cattai Creek, near Windsor, New South Wales
- Died: April 23, 1896 Jerry's Plains, New South Wales
- Spouse: Sarah Alcorn
- Children: 8
- Occupation: Pastoralist, politician

John Brown (13 December 1821 – 23 April 1896) was an Australian politician.

He was born at Cattai Creek near Windsor to farmer David Brown and Mary Elizabeth McMahon. A pastoralist, he married Sarah Alcorn in 1848; they had eight children. In 1880 he was elected to the New South Wales Legislative Assembly for Patrick's Plains, but he did not re-contest in 1882. Brown died at Jerry's Plains in 1896.

New South Wales Legislative Assembly
Preceded by William Browne	Member for Patrick's Plains; 1880–1882	Succeeded by Albert Gould
