= Katie Ardill =

Australian medical doctor (1886–1955)

Katie Ardill Brice OBE MB ChM
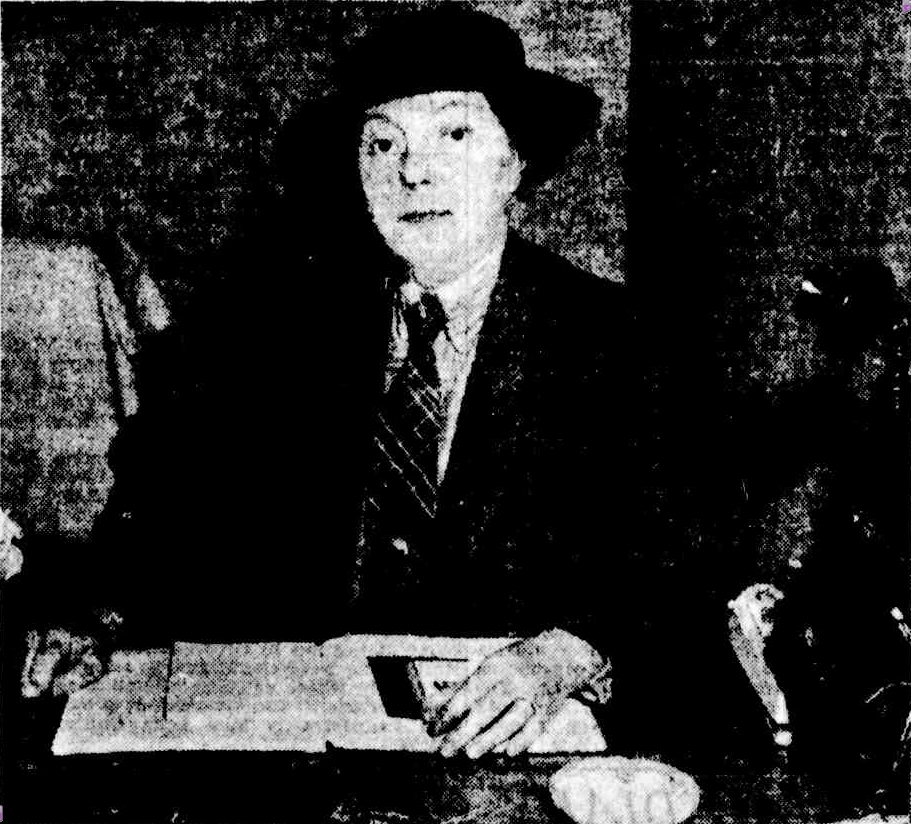
- Born: Katie Louisa Ardill; 3 August 1886; Sydney, Australia
- Died: 3 January 1955 (aged 68)
- Education: University of Sydney
- Military career
- Branch: British Expeditionary Forces
- Rank: Captain (Medical doctor)
- Conflicts: World War I
- Awards: OBE (1941), and Dame of Grade of the Order of St John of Jerusalem (1952)
- Other work: Chairwoman of St John Ambulance Brigade

Katie Louisa Ardill, OBE MB ChM (3 August 1886 – 3 January 1955) was an Australian medical doctor. She was the first woman to be appointed as a divisional surgeon in New South Wales, and a year later was among the first female doctors when she joined the British Expeditionary Forces in Egypt in 1915.

== Early life and education ==
Born in Chippendale, a suburb in inner Sydney, to two evangelist social workers, George Edward Ardill, an Australian politician, and Louisa Ardill (née Wales), a matron-superintendent of the Home of Hope hospital which was eventually renamed the South Sydney Women's hospital. Schooled at Wellesley College, Ardill graduated from University of Sydney on 9 April 1913 with a degree in medicine.

== Career ==
In 1913, Ardill completed a one-year internship at the Prince Alfred Hospital and served as an honorary anaesthetist and out-patients medical officer at the South Sydney Women's Hospital. During that year she began working as a lecturer and an examiner of first aid and Home Nursing Classes at the St. John Ambulance Association's Training Branch, and joined the St John Ambulance Brigade Headquarters Nursing Division a year later.

=== World War I service ===
Ardill served as a doctor for four years during World War I, respectively in Britain, France and Egypt. Her application to serve with the Australian Expeditionary Forces was rejected because she was a woman. At that time, Australian government policy prohibited women from service, compelling them to join overseas units instead. Ardill therefore travelled to Britain, signing up with the British Red Cross who in September 1915 deployed her to serve at the Anglo-Belgian Hospital in Calais. In mid-1916, Ardill become one of the first women doctors in the British Expeditionary Forces field services, when the army changed their policy to allow the to enlist on a contractual basis. Serving under the Royal Army Medical Corps, Ardill was deployed to the County Middlesex War Hospital, St. Albans, England. This was previously an asylum, but in September 1915 it was reopened as a hospital to treat wounded soldiers as they arrived from the Western Front, and had 1600 beds and the capacity to treat 250 men in its specialist military mental health unit. She then worked at the Anglo-Belgian Base Clearing Military Hospital at Étaples in France, where she was the only Australian woman doctor until 1917, and was later promoted to the rank of captain. Other service included posts at Napbury, the Dover military hospital, and the Citadel hospital, Cairo, all with the British Army.

=== Post World War I ===
When she returned to Australia in August 1919, Ardill rejoined the Sydney Central Nursing Division, returned to her hospital work, and established a gynaecological practice in Macquarie Street, Sydney. She later began to offer a free clinic from her Macquarie Street rooms for wives and children of servicemen.

On 1 June 1921, she married Charles Christie Brice at St Andrews Cathedral in Sydney. Her husband was a law student at the time and later became an accountant.

From 1933, she was an honorary member of the Racial Hygiene Association of New South Wales (which eventually became the Family Planning Association of New South Wales), having become a consultant in 1932. After joining the St John Ambulance Brigade, she became an executive member from 1938, served as deputy chairman in 1947–48, and became the Brigade's first chairwoman in New South Wales, a role she held from 1950 to 1955.

In 1952, Ardill travelled to England with her husband, captain Charles Brice; while there she studied atomic bomb defence at the British Military School of Civil Defence.

She researched treatment for atomic blast in Britain in 1952, and died on 3 January 1955.

== Awards and honours ==
In 1929 Katie Louisa Ardill was appointed a life member of the St John Ambulance Association. She was admitted to the Order of St John as a member in 1938, was promoted to Officer of the Order in 1943, and in 1947 was promoted to the Commander of the Order. She was promoted "Dame of Grace" of the order of St John of Jerusalem in 1952, having served as a sister from the date of her admission to the order in 1938. She was made an Officer of the Order of the British Empire in 1941.
