= William Russell (New South Wales politician) =

English-born Australian politician

William Russell (1807 – 2 April 1866) was an English-born Australian politician.

He was born at Woodbridge in Suffolk to soldier Andrew Hamilton Russell and Sarah Blundell. He settled in New South Wales in 1836, possibly after a naval career, and became a pastoralist based in the Hunter River district. On 11 March 1841 he married Jane Rebecca Griffiths Jamison, with whom he had eleven children. He was elected to the New South Wales Legislative Assembly for Patrick's Plains in 1859, but he was defeated in 1860. In 1861 he was appointed to the New South Wales Legislative Council, where he served until 1865 when his seat was vacated due to absence. Russell died at Tarban Creek in 1866.

New South Wales Legislative Assembly
New seat	Member for Patrick's Plains; 1859–1860	Succeeded by William Lesley
