= James Toomey =

- Born: 28 November 1862; Wagga Wagga, New South Wales
- Died: 1 April 1920 (aged 57); Lambton, New South Wales
- Occupation: Trade unionist
- Political party: Australian Labor Party
- Spouse: Elizabeth Mary Post
- Children: 1

James Morton Toomey (28 November 1862 – 1 April 1920) was an Australian trade unionist.

== Political and unionist career ==
Born at Gribbin Station near Wagga Wagga to superintendent James Henry Toomey and Sarah Jane Morton, Toomey helped found the Wagga Wagga Shearers' Union in 1886. In 1888 he moved to Young and was elected first secretary of the local branch of the Shearers' Union; he also established local branches of the Amalgamated Miners' Association and the District Carriers' Union, and a local trades and labour council composed solely of his three unions. A conference he organised resulted in the first specific agreement between shearers and pastoralists. His cooperation with the pastoralists' unions played a part in preventing the spread of the 1891 shearers' strike into New South Wales.

A significant part in the organisation of the early Labor Party, he worked tirelessly for a united party at the 1894 election. Although he would have had a strong chance of winning Young, he persuaded Chris Watson to run for that seat and instead contested Boorowa and was defeated. Subsequently his influence declined, and the Australian Workers' Union abolished the Young branch in 1896 to cut costs. Toomey felt abandoned and bitter, and his only subsequent union involvement was as a delegate to the AWU conferences in 1898 and 1899 from Creswick. He returned to Young and ran unsuccessfully for the first federal parliament, contesting East Sydney.

== Latter career ==
Declared bankrupt in 1905, he married Elizabeth Mary Post on 26 December 1906 and became an accountant and paymaster on the northern coalfields. Having been dismissed after he supported striking miners, he worked as a traveller until his death of chronic nephritis at Lambton in 1920.
