= Ardell =

Ardell is a name which can serve as a given name and as a surname.

Notable people with the given name:

- Ardell Brede (born 1939), American politician
- Shirley Ardell Mason (1923–1998), American psychiatric patient and art teacher
- Ardell Wiegandt (born 1940), American/Canadian football coach

Notable people with the surname:

- Dan Ardell (born 1941), American baseball player
- Donald Ardell, American politician
- James MacArdell (1729?–1765), Irish engraver of mezzotints

== See also ==
- The Ardells, there have been several bands called the Ardells
