= Thomas Colls =

Politician and hotelier in New South Wales, Australia

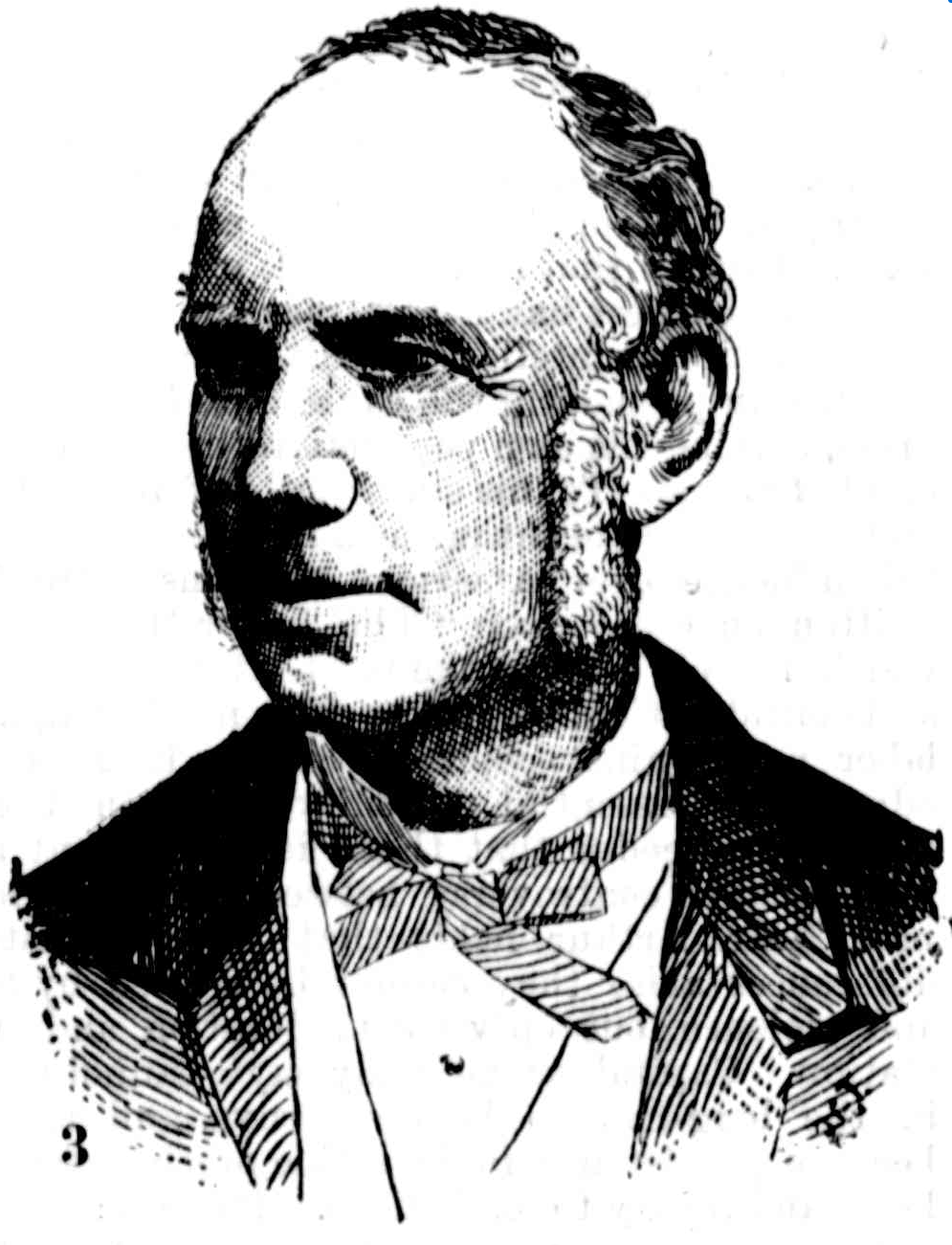
Mr Thomas Colls MLA for Yass Plains

Thomas Colls (1822 – 2 March 1898) was a politician and hotelier in New South Wales.

He was born in Liverpool to Thomas Colls and Sarah Perkins. He attended a boarding school near Campbelltown before being apprenticed to a wheelwright. In 1847 he moved to Yass, working as a wheelwright, blacksmith and farrier. He became a hotelier in 1848, retiring in 1873. His first marriage was to Elizabeth Clegg in 1842 and produced ten children; the second was to Minnie Linsley in 1894. In around 1874 Colls was elected a Yass alderman and was elected Mayor of Yass in December 1874, re-elected in 1875. He continued to serve as an alderman until 1897.

serving four times as mayor. In 1886, he was elected to the New South Wales Legislative Assembly as the member for Yass Plains. A Protectionist, he held the seat until his defeat in 1894 when the district was renamed Yass.

Colls died at Yass in 1898 (aged 75–76) .

New South Wales Legislative Assembly
Preceded by Louis Heydon	Member for Yass Plains; 1886 – 1894	Succeeded by William Affleck as Member for Yass
Civic offices
Preceded by James Cottrell	Mayor of Yass; December 1874 – February 1876	Succeeded by Henry Sampson
Preceded by George Thomson	Mayor of Yass; March 1881 – February 1883	Succeeded by Edward Iceton
