= Peter Faucett =

Politician, barrister and judge in New South Wales, Australia

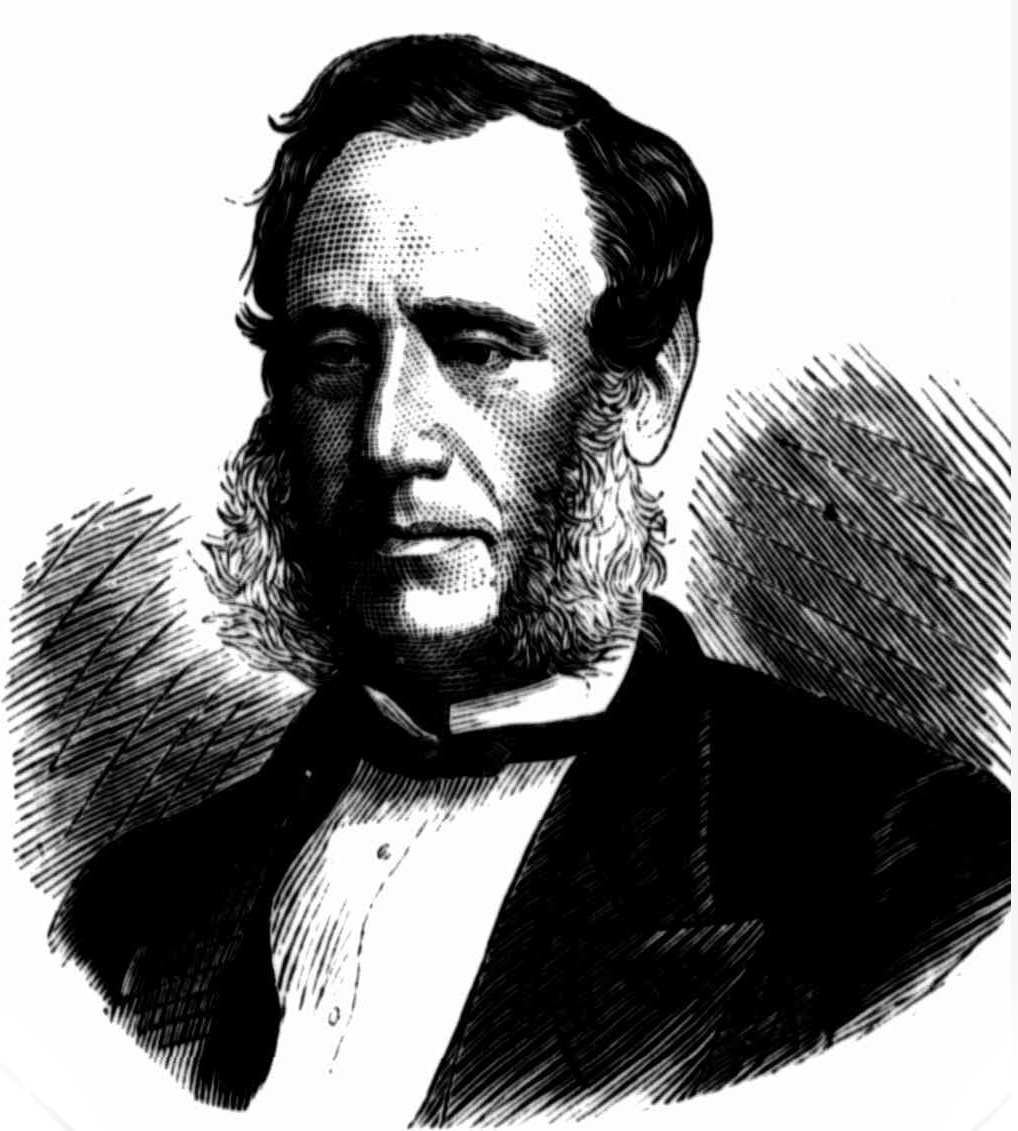

Solicitor General
- In office 16 October 1863 – 2 February 1865
- Preceded by: John Hargrave
- Succeeded by: John Hargrave

Judge of the Supreme Court (NSW)
- In office 4 October 1865 – 8 February 1888

Personal details
- Born: 1 January 1813 Dublin, Ireland
- Died: 22 May 1894 (aged 80–81) Five Dock, New South Wales
- Resting place: Petersham Cemetery
- Spouse: Frances Clements

Peter Faucett (1813 – 22 May 1894) was an Australian barrister, judge and politician. He was a member of the New South Wales Legislative Assembly between 1856 and 1865. He held the position of Solicitor General in the first government of James Martin. He was a judge of the Supreme Court between 1865 and 1888 and a member of the New South Wales Legislative Council between 1888 and 1894.

== Early life ==
Faucett was born in Dublin on 29 September 1813, the son Catherine née Cook and Peter Faucett, a blacksmith from Ballyconnell, County Cavan. He was educated at Trinity College where he graduated with a Bachelor of Arts. He was called to the Irish Bar in 1845 and emigrated to Sydney in 1852 and was admitted to the New South Wales Bar on 19 December 1852 where he established a large, private legal practice, regularly appearing in criminal proceedings.

== Parliamentary career ==
Faucett was as a member of the first New South Wales Legislative Assembly which was elected after the establishment of responsible self-government in 1856. He was elected as the member for King and Georgiana and retained the seat, unopposed, at the 1858 election. Faucett was not a candidate at the 1859 election and was an unsuccessful candidate at the 1859 East Maitland by-election caused by the resignation of Joseph Chambers who had accepted a position as Crown Prosecutor in the Western Districts of New South Wales. Faucett was also unsuccessful at a ministerial by-election for the four member seat of East Sydney in November 1859 but eventually re-entered parliament as the member for that seat after winning the 1860 by-election caused by the resignation of Charles Cowper. However he was subsequently defeated at the general election held later that year. King and Georgiana had been replaced by Yass Plains and Faucett again entered parliament as the member for the region at the 1861 by-election caused by the resignation, due to ill-health of the incumbent Henry O'Brien. He retained the seat until his resignation from the Assembly in 1865 to accept an appointment as a judge of the Supreme Court.

Faucett's only ministerial appointment was as Solicitor General in the first government of James Martin, at a time when the Solicitor General often the conducted criminal prosecutions. It has been said that his career in public office was unspectacular but he had an earnest desire to see justice done and was a "plain-spoken, sober-sided, solid man".

== Later life and death ==
Faucett was appointed a Judge of the Supreme Court on 4 October 1865, serving until 8 February 1888 when he resigned due to ill health. In April he accepted a life appointment to the Legislative Council, which he retained until his death.

He married Frances Susan Clements on 21 January 1862 at St Mary's Cathedral, however she died in childbirth on 3 June 1866.

He had an intense interest in education. He was a Member of the Denominational School Board from 6 March 1854 to July 1864. He was a member of the Committee of Management for the Institute for Destitute Children at Parramatta in 1859. He was a Fellow of the Senate of the University of Sydney from 1859 to 1894 and an honorary examiner in law from 1869 to at least 1891. He was a member of the council to establish The Women's College at the University of Sydney in 1891–1892. On 21 August 1857 Faucett introduced a petition and a bill to the New South Wales Parliament for the establishment of St John's College at the university. He was also a Fellow of the College Council from 1858 to 1863. Whilst in Parliament, Faucett advocated state support for religious denominations and their schools, no matter the denomination. He was also involved in the establishment of St Vincent's Hospital.

He died at Five Dock on 22 May 1894 (aged 80–81), survived by his daughter Frances (aged 27).

== See also ==
- Members of the New South Wales Legislative Assembly
- 1856–1858
- 1858–1859
- 1859–1860
- 1860–1864
- 1864–1869
- Results of New South Wales elections
- 1856 (King and Georgiana)
- 1858 (King and Georgiana)
- 1859 (East Maitland by)
- 1859 (East Sydney by)
- 1860 (East Sydney by)
- 1860 (East Sydney)
- 1860 (Hunter)
- 1861 (Goulburn by)
- 1861 (Yass Plains by)
- 1864 (Yass Plains)
- Members of the New South Wales Legislative Council
- 1887–1889
- 1889–1891
- 1891–1894

Parliament of New South Wales
Political offices
Preceded by John Hargrave	Solicitor General; 1863 – 1865	Succeeded by John Hargrave
New South Wales Legislative Assembly
New assembly	Member for King and Georgiana; 1856 – 1859	Succeeded by Seat abolished
Preceded by Charles Cowper	Member for East Sydney; 1860; With: John Black; Henry Parkes; James Martin	Succeeded by Charles Cowper; Henry Parkes; John Caldwell; Robert Stewart
Preceded by Henry O'Brien	Member for Yass Plains; 1861 – 1865	Succeeded by Robert Isaacs
