= William Affleck =

Australian politician

William Affleck (5 March 1836 – 6 March 1923) was a Scottish-born Australian politician.

He was born in West Wemyss in Fifeshire, Scotland; his father was storekeeper Arthur Affleck, while his mother's name is unknown. He received a primary education before being apprenticed as a confectioner, and later at a warehouse. He arrived in New South Wales in 1855 and settled at Gundaroo, where he and his father worked as storekeepers. In August 1865 he married Catherine Campbell Cameron, with whom he had two sons; his second marriage, on 17 June 1880, was to Isabella Anderson. In 1894 he was elected to the New South Wales Legislative Assembly as the Free Trade member for Yass; he served until his defeat in 1904.

He died at Strathfield in 1923 (aged 87).

New South Wales Legislative Assembly
Preceded by Thomas Colls as member for Yass Plains	Member for Yass; 1894–1904	Succeeded by Niels Nielsen
