= Thomas Slattery =

Solicitor and politician from New South Wales, Australia

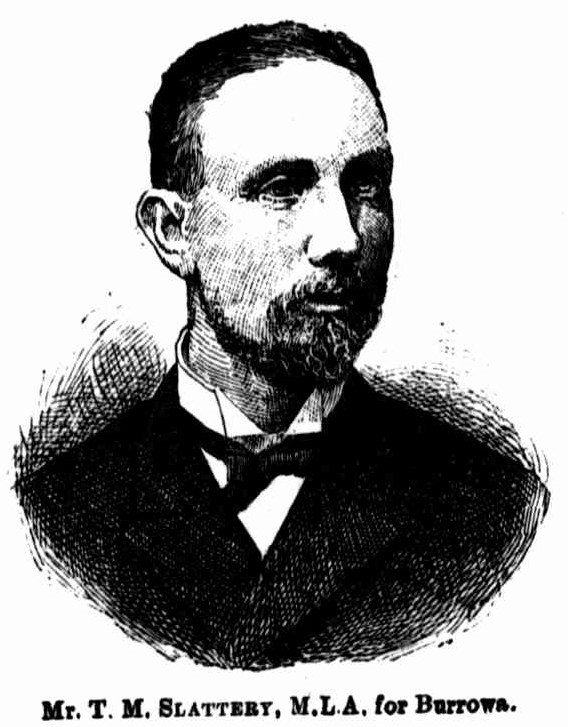

Thomas Michael Slattery (17 December 1844 – 25 July 1920) was an Irish-born Australian solicitor and politician.

He was born in Greenane in County Tipperary to shoemaker Edward Slattery and Alice Walsh. His family arrived in Sydney in 1847 and he attended St Mary's Seminary School before becoming a junior clerk in 1864. First working for the Customs Department, he clerked for the Supreme Court of New South Wales from 1872, becoming chief clerk in 1874. In 1875, he was admitted as a solicitor, practising first in the matrimonial courts and then from 1880 privately. On 10 January 1867 he married Annie Genevieve O'Connor, with whom he had four children. His wife died in 1885 and on 23 November 1886 he married her sister Agnes Melanie O'Connor.

In 1880 he was elected to the New South Wales Legislative Assembly as the member for Boorowa. He served in the Assembly until 1895, during which time he became associated with the Protectionist Party. He was twice Minister of Justice (1885, 1889), and also served as from 1891 to 1894. In 1900 he was appointed to the New South Wales Legislative Council, where he remained until 1905.

In April 1905 Slattery was convicted in the Supreme Court of stealing £6,958 that had been collected by him on behalf of Mrs Mary Scanlon. Justice Pring sentenced him to three and a half years in prison. His conviction was upheld by the Full Court, and he was struck off the roll of solicitors.

On 13 June 1905 his seat in the Legislative Council was declared vacant on account of being convicted of a felony. Later that month the High Court heard his appeal and quashed the conviction on the technicality that while Slattery had fraudulently misappropriated the money he was not properly convicted of larceny. The quashing of his conviction did not result in Slattery being restored to the Legislative Council.

Slattery and his wife went to the United States of America, returning in 1909.

He died in Mosman in 1920 (aged 75).

New South Wales Legislative Assembly
New district	Member for Boorowa; 1880 – 1895	Succeeded by Kenneth Mackay
Political offices
Preceded by James Farnell	Minister of Justice; Nov – Dec 1885	Succeeded by Louis Heydon
Preceded by William Clarke	Minister of Justice; Jan – Mar 1889	Succeeded by Albert Gould
Preceded by Sydney Smith	Secretary for Mines and Agriculture; 1891 – 1894	Succeeded by Sydney Smith
