= George Ardill =

Australian politician (1889–1964)

New South Wales Legislative Assembly
- In office 1930–1941
- Constituency: Yass

Personal details
- Born: 18 October 1889
- Died: 13 July 1964 (aged 74)
- Party: Nationalist Party
- Other political affiliations: United Australia Party
- Spouse: Louisa Wales Ardill
- Children: Katie Louisa Ardill, George Edward Ardill

George Edward Ardill (18 October 1889 – 13 July 1964) was an Australian politician. He was a member of the New South Wales Legislative Assembly from 1930 to 1941, representing the electorate of Yass for the Nationalist Party and its successor, the United Australia Party.

Ardill was born in Newtown, the son of George Ardill, senior, a conservative Christian evangelist and social activist who was a prominent advocate of the removal of Aboriginal children from their families to be resettled in white homes. He was educated at Stanmore Public School and Newington College (1903–1907). He was a dairy farmer at Coraki for a time after leaving school, before buying his own property at Gunning in 1916. He also worked as a stock and station agent and auctioneer, and at one point also owned a motor garage.

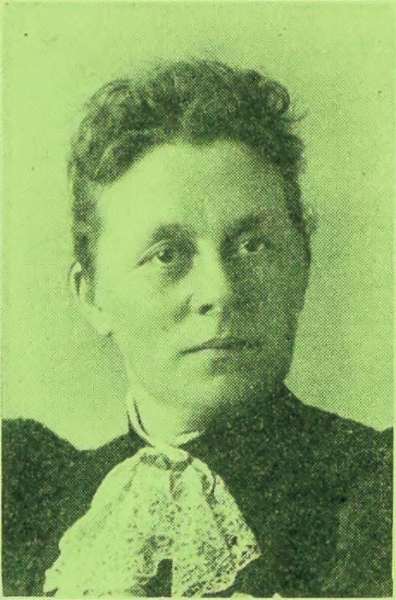
Louisa Wales Ardill

George Ardill married his wife Louisa Wales (1853–1920) on 8 September 1885 at the Baptist Church, Bathurst Street. They had two children, Katie Louisa Ardill (1886–1955) who was born on 3 August 1886 at Knox Street, and George Edward Ardill (1889–1964) who was born on 18 October 1889 at Darlinghurst. Katie attended Wellesley College, and the University of Sydney and became a medical doctor, and served in World War I and a surgeon. George was educated at Stanmore Public School and Newington College. After Louisa's death in 1920, Ardill married his second wife Kelsie Hannah, née Starr, whom he had married on 5 October 1921.

Ardill was actively involved in community organisations throughout his life, serving as a member of the Aborigines Protection Board from 1936 to 1945, as Executive Director of the Society for Providing Homes for Neglected Children from 1945 to 1964, and as Foundation President of the Sound Finance League of Australia in 1933. At a local level, he was a councillor of the Gunning Shire Council from 1920 until 1934 and 1938 until 1941, and shire president in 1923 and 1927–1928. He was also secretary of the local agricultural society, founder of the local dramatic society, branch secretary of the Primary Producers Union and Graziers Association, and a Methodist lay preacher for the Gunning circuit.

Ardill entered state politics at the 1930 election, narrowly winning the new, notionally Nationalist seat of Yass. He was easily re-elected in 1932, 1935, and 1938. He was appointed to Government Whip in 1937. He attempted to shift to the adjacent seat of Goulburn at the 1941 election after a hostile redistribution affected his margin in Yass, but lost to the incumbent Labor MLA, Jack Tully. He attempted to re-enter parliament in 1944, contesting the seat of Hawkesbury, but was again unsuccessful. He thereafter retired from politics.

Ardill died at Concord in 1964.

New South Wales Legislative Assembly
Preceded by Seat recreated	Member for Yass; 1930–1941	Succeeded by Bill Sheahan
