= Farnell ministry =

New South Wales government ministry led by James Farnell

- 18th Cabinet of the Colony of New South Wales

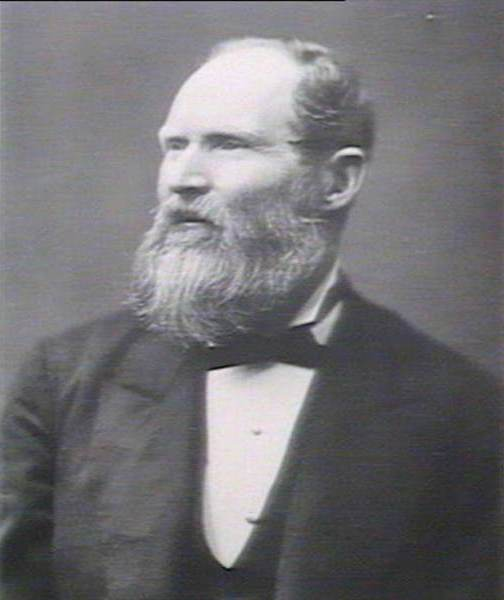
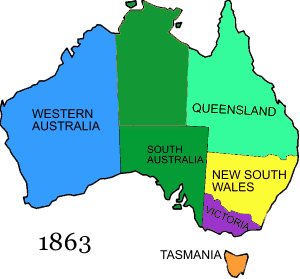
- Premier James Farnell and the Colony of New South Wales (1863–1900)
- Date formed: 18 December 1877
- Date dissolved: 20 December 1878

People and organisations
- Monarch: Queen Victoria
- Governor: Hercules Robinson
- Head of government: James Farnell
- No. of ministers: 9
- Member party: unaligned
- Status in legislature: Minority government
- Opposition party: unaligned
- Opposition leader: Henry Parkes

History
- Predecessor: Fourth Robertson ministry
- Successor: Third Parkes ministry

The Farnell ministry was the eighteenth ministry of the Colony of New South Wales, and was led by James Farnell. Farnell was first elected to the New South Wales Legislative Assembly in 1860.

The eighth parliament had been a challenging environment, where neither Sir John Robertson nor Sir Henry Parkes had been able to maintain the confidence of the Legislative Assembly. The 1877 election did not resolve the issue with neither Robertson nor Parkes obtaining a majority. Instead the government was formed by Farnell as a compromise Premier.

The title of Premier was widely used to refer to the Leader of the Government, but was not a formal ministerial office until 1920.

There was no party system in New South Wales politics until 1887. Under the constitution, ministers were required to resign to recontest their seats in a by-election when appointed. Such ministerial by-elections were usually uncontested and on this occasion a poll was required for Yass Plains (Michael Fitzpatrick) and he was easily re-elected. The six other ministers, James Farnell (St Leonards), Henry Cohen (West Maitland), Joseph Leary (The Murrumbidgee), John Sutherland (Paddington), William Suttor Jr. (East Macquarie) and John Burns (The Hunter), were re-elected unopposed.

This ministry covers the period from 18 December 1877 until 20 December 1878, when Farnell resigned following his inability to gain safe passage of a land bill through Parliament. Sir Henry Parkes succeeded Farnell as Leader of the Government.

== Composition of ministry ==
Portfolio	Minister	Term start	Term end	Term length
Premier; Secretary for Lands	James Farnell	18 December 1877	20 December 1878	1 year, 2 days
Colonial Secretary	Michael Fitzpatrick	18 December 1877	20 December 1878	1 year, 2 days
Colonial Treasurer	Henry Cohen	18 December 1877	20 December 1878	1 year, 2 days
Minister of Justice and Public Instruction	Joseph Leary	18 December 1877	20 December 1878	1 year, 2 days
Secretary for Public Works	John Sutherland	18 December 1877	20 December 1878	1 year, 2 days
Attorney General	William Foster MLC	18 December 1877	20 December 1878	1 year, 2 days
Secretary for Mines	William Suttor	18 December 1877	20 December 1878	1 year, 2 days
Postmaster-General of New South Wales	John Burns	18 December 1877	20 December 1878	1 year, 2 days
Vice-President of the Executive Council; Representative of the Government in the Legislative Council	John Marks MLC	14 January 1878	20 December 1878	340 days

Ministers are members of the Legislative Assembly unless otherwise noted.

== See also ==
- James Farnell - eighth Premier of New South Wales
- Self-government in New South Wales
- Members of the New South Wales Legislative Assembly, 1877–1880

Preceded by Fourth Robertson ministry	Farnell ministry 1877–1878	Succeeded by Third Parkes ministry
