= William Lesley =

Scottish-born Australian politician

William Copland Lesley (1820 – 21 July 1876) was a Scottish-born Australian politician.

He was born at Foveran to Royal Navy lieutenant William Lesley and Jane Watt. A chemist, he migrated to Australia in 1841 and settled at Singleton. On 22 October 1850 he married Mary Perrett. In 1860 he was elected to the New South Wales Legislative Assembly for Patrick's Plains, but he resigned in 1861. Lesley died at Singleton in 1876.

New South Wales Legislative Assembly
Preceded by William Russell	Member for Patrick's Plains; 1860–1861	Succeeded by Joseph Harpur
