= Louis Heydon =

Politician and solicitor from New South Wales, Australia

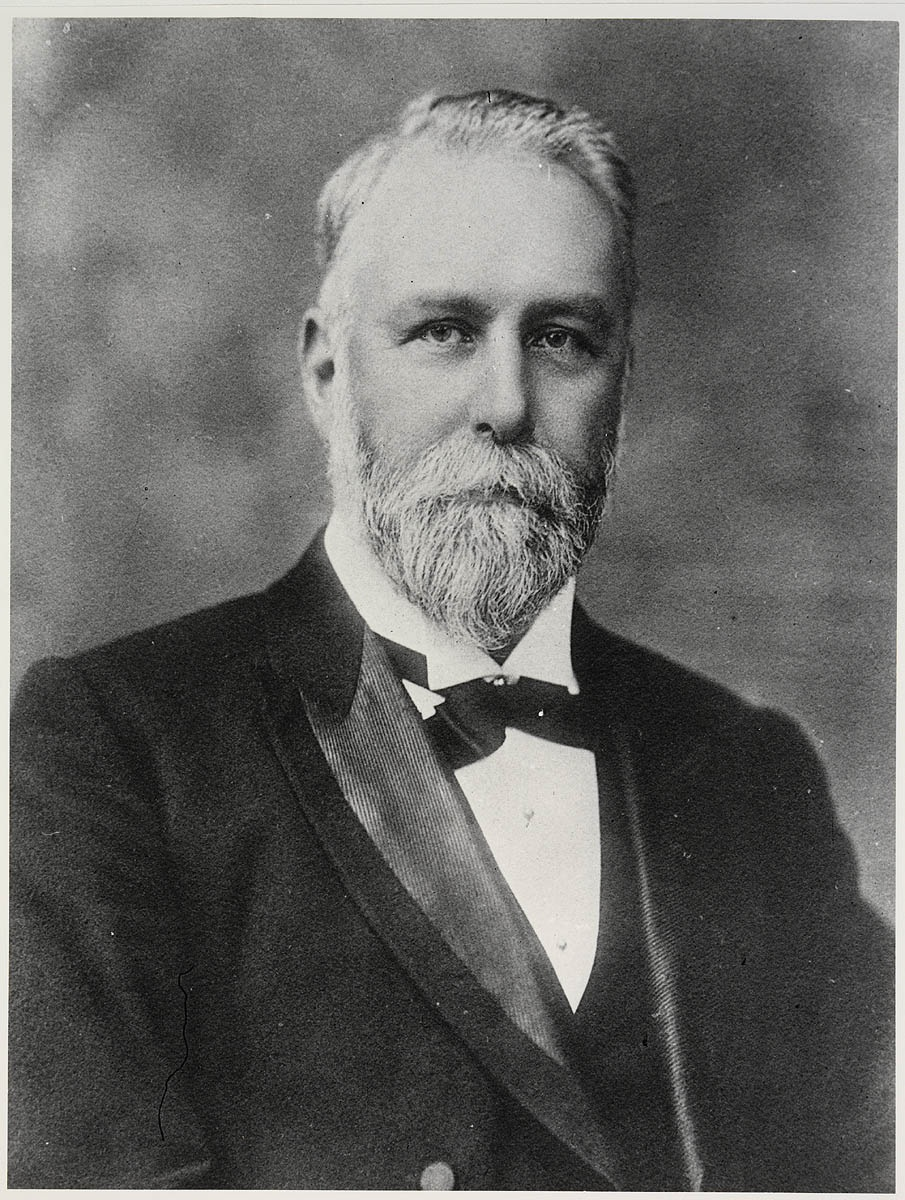

Louis Francis Heydon (23 April 1848 – 17 May 1918) was a politician and solicitor in New South Wales, Australia and was Minister of Justice for six weeks 1885 to 1886.

== Early life ==
Heydon was born in Sydney, New South Wales, the son of Jabez King Heydon and Sophia née Hayes. He was educated at St Mary's Cathedral school and then Sydney Grammar School. He was admitted as a solicitor in 1873 and practiced in Bathurst for eight years, before returning to Sydney where he entered into a partnership with Thomas Slattery. He married Mary Josephine Gell Lithgow, New South Wales on 15 August 1881.

== Political career ==
He stood as a candidate for the New South Wales Legislative Assembly at the 1880 election for Argyle, finishing 3rd with a margin of 212 votes (5.7%). He contested the by-election for Argyle in December 1881, but was again unsuccessful. He found success in January 1882 at the by-election for Yass Plains, holding the seat at the elections in December 1882 and October 1885. In 1884 Heydon was part of a land reform conference, which included Paddy Crick, Edward O'Sullivan and Adolphus Taylor to "establish a political organisation of the agricultural, mining, and working classes of New South Wales, in order to initiate a more liberal and progressive policy for the colony", a protectionist party that became known as the Land and Industrial Alliance. Heydon later became president and recognised as the leader of the party.

In December 1885 he was appointed minister for justice in the fifth Robertson ministry, but resigned 44 days later because he disagreed with the suggested property tax. He resigned from the Legislative Assembly on 29 November 1886.

In February 1889 he was appointed to the New South Wales Legislative Council by the second Dibbs Ministry. In 1893 his elder brother Charles was also appointed to the Legislative Council.

== Controversies ==
In 1890 Heydon was one of 13 members who lodged protests against the passage of the divorce bill introduced by Sir Alfred Stephen, who as well as being a member of the Legislative Council and Chief Justice was also Lieutenant-Governor. Heydon's protest was expunged from the record of the council because it included the following passage:

4. Because this measure has not been carried in this House by reason of its merits, and because it commended itself to the judgment of a majority of honorable members, but by the influence of the member introducing it. The small majority of twenty-six to twenty-one, by which the third reading of the bill was carried, would, certainly, in my opinion, have been reversed, and the bill have been rejected by a much larger majority against it but for the extreme enthusiasm and devotion to the measure shown by the member who introduced it, and his warm, personal canvas, and persevering solicitations of honorable members, coupled with his great influence and high position as Lieutenant-Governor of the colony. It is specially a matter for protest that, while actually discharging the duties of Governor, in the absence of Lord Carrington, the author of the bill sent down, by the member in charge of the bill, a message from Government House, the night before the final division on the bill, to his supporters in the House, to thank them, as he said, for having sustained him in his efforts to pass the bill.

In 1901 the Incorporated Law Institute of New South Wales commenced disciplinary proceedings against him for misconduct. In 1896 the trustees for an estate commenced proceedings with Heydon acting for them. Five of the defendants approached Heydon to represent them. As he couldn't represent both plaintiff and defendants, Heydon referred them to five different solicitors, with an agreement that he would receive a percentage of the costs they were paid. Apparently the payment of an introduction fee was a common practice for solicitors at the time. Part of the result of the litigation was the replacement of the trustees for the estate, the new trustees for the estate found out about the arrangements and sought to recover the payments made to Heydon. The trial judge, A. H. Simpson, stated that the practice was indefensible and ordered that Heydon pay the money to the plaintiff, plus costs. Out of costs of £5,068 Heydon had received £977 commission, which he repaid to the plaintiff. In the disciplinary proceedings the Full Court also condemned the practice, which Chief Justice Sir Frederick Darley stating it "was of a vicious tendency and wholly indefensible", fining Heydon £50 plus paying costs of the proceedings. He was not however suspended from practice.

== Death ==
Heydon died in Hunters Hill, Sydney, New South Wales, Australia, on 17 May 1918 (aged 70). He was survived by a son, Joseph Kentigern Heydon, and a daughter, Mrs Mary Elizabeth Collingridge.

Parliament of New South Wales
Political offices
Preceded by Thomas Slattery	Minister of Justice; Dec 1885 – Feb 1886	Succeeded by James Garvan
New South Wales Legislative Assembly
Preceded by Michael Fitzpatrick	Member for Yass Plains; 1882–1886	Succeeded by Thomas Colls
