= Kenneth Mackay (Australian politician) =

Australian politician (1859–1935)

Major General Kenneth Mackay CB, OBE, VD
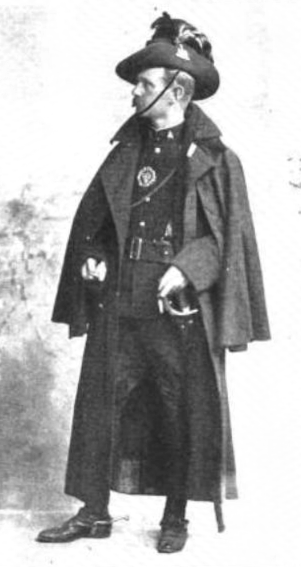
- In The Sketch, 11 July 1900

Member of the New South Wales Legislative Council
- In office 18 October 1899 – 22 April 1934

Member of the New South Wales Legislative Assembly for Boorowa
- In office 24 July 1895 – 15 September 1899
- Preceded by: Thomas Slattery
- Succeeded by: Niels Nielsen

Personal details
- Born: 5 June 1859 Wallendbeen, New South Wales
- Died: 16 November 1935 (aged 76) Cootamundra, New South Wales
- Party: Protectionist Party

Military service
- Allegiance: Australia
- Branch/service: New South Wales Military Forces (1885–01); Citizens Military Force (1901–20)
- Years of service: 1885–1920
- Rank: Major-General
- Commands: 1st Light Horse Brigade (1912–14); New South Wales Imperial Bushmen (1900); 1st Australian Horse (1897–00); West Camden Light Horse (1885–86)
- Battles/wars: Second Boer War; First World War
- Awards: Companion of the Order of the Bath; Officer of the Order of the British Empire; Mentioned in Despatches; Volunteer Officers' Decoration

Major-General James Alexander Kenneth Mackay, CB, OBE, VD (5 June 1859 – 16 November 1935), usually known as Kenneth Mackay, was an Australian soldier and politician.

== Personal life ==
Born at Wallendbeen station, near Murrumburrah, the second son to pastoralist Alexander Mackay and Annie Mackenzie, he attended Camden College and Sydney Grammar School before farming at his father's property. His brother Donald Mackay went on to aerially survey areas of central Australia.

In 1890 Mackay married Mabel White from Victoria, a member of a squatter family. He died at Cootamundra in 1935, survived by his wife and two daughters (Annie Mabel Baldry and Agnes Jean).

== Military and political life ==
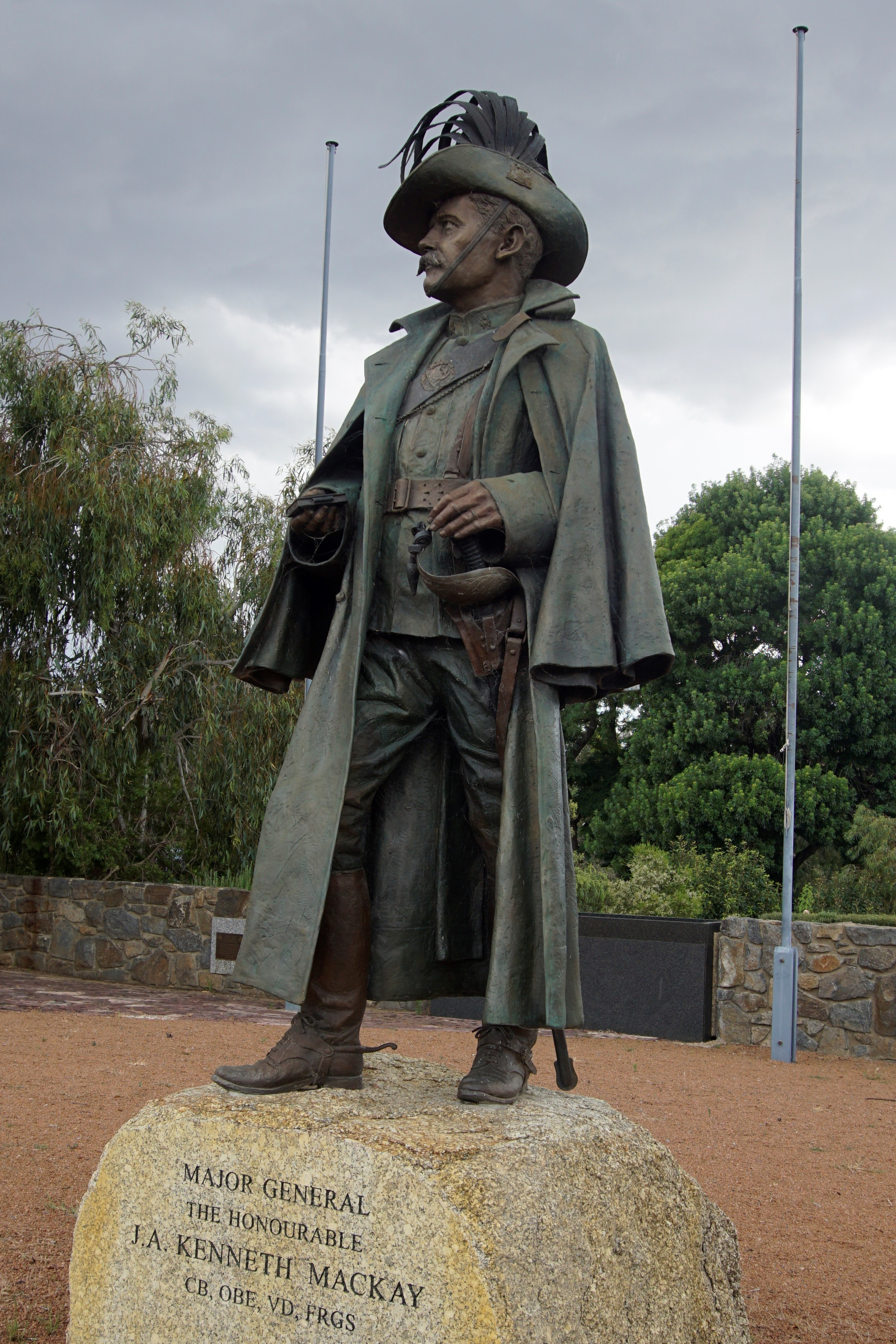
Statue of Mackay at Murrumburrah

Loving horses, including being an amateur jockey, in 1885 he joined the military volunteers and raised the West Camden Light Horse; he was a commissioned as a captain in 1886.

In 1897 he raised the 1st Australian Volunteer Horse Regiment, and he was elevated lieutenant colonel in 1898. His military force was captured in two poems by Scottish-Australian poet Will H. Ogilvie (1869–1963), in The Real Mackays! (1898) and Your Chance, Mackays! (1899).

In 1895 he was elected to the New South Wales Legislative Assembly as the member for Boorowa, serving until 1899, when he was appointed to the Legislative Council. Mackay served as Vice-President of the Executive Council and Representative of the Government in the Legislative Council in the Lyne ministry from September 1899 to April 1900, when he left to serve in the Boer War until 1901, commanding the 6th Imperial Bushmen's contingent of New South Wales. He saw action at Elands River, was mentioned in despatches, and made a Companion of the Order of the Bath (CB). Mackay was awarded the South African War Medal with four clasps, (Rhodesia, Transvaal, Orange River Colony and Cape Colony) Whilst in South Africa he stood as a candidate for the Australian Senate at the 1901 election, but was unsuccessful.

He returned from South Africa in July 1901. He resumed his former position of Vice President of the Executive Council and Representative of the Government in the Legislative Council in 1903 as part of the See ministry, serving until 1904.

From 1906 to 1907, Mackay was the chairman of a Royal Commission overseeing the administration of the Territory of Papua, where he submitted a report in 1907.

He continued to serve in the Legislative Council until 1934 when the council was reformed by members indirectly elected by the Parliament.

Promoted colonel and then brigadier in 1912 and awarded the Volunteer Officers' Decoration. He drew up plans for the Australian Army Reserve in 1915, and became its first director-general in 1916. Considered too old, he was not appointed to active service overseas in World War I. He was appointed to conduct an inquiry into the Liverpool riot of 1916 by soldiers at the Liverpool and Casula camps. In 1920 he was promoted brigadier general and later retired as a major general. He was appointed an Officer of the Order of the British Empire on his retirement.

== Writings ==
Kenneth Mackay published three books of poetry, including Stirrup Jingles of sporting and bush verse, and two novels from 1887 to 1908. His books included Outback (1893), The Yellow Wave (1895), an invasion literature work, and Across Papua.

In 1896 he published a play, To the West, a collaboration with Alfred Dampier.

His poems included the Sons of Britannia still we are (1898).

Parliament of New South Wales
Political offices
| Preceded by William Lyne | Vice-President of the Executive Council; 1899–1900 | Succeeded by Francis Suttor |
| Preceded by John Hughes | Representative of the Government in the Legislative Council; 1899–1900 | Succeeded by Francis Suttor |
| Preceded by Francis Suttor | Vice-President of the Executive Council; Representative of the Government in the Legislative Council; 1903–1904 | Succeeded by John Hughes |
New South Wales Legislative Assembly
| Preceded by Thomas Slattery | Member for Boorowa; 1895–1899 | Succeeded by Niels Nielsen |
