= Electoral district of Boorowa =

Former state electoral district of New South Wales, Australia

Boorowa was an electoral district of the Legislative Assembly in the Australian State of New South Wales from 1880 to 1904, including the town of Boorowa. Its name was spelt "Booroowa" from 1899 to 1901. It was abolished in the 1904 re-distribution of electorates following the 1903 New South Wales referendum, which required the number of members of the Legislative Assembly to be reduced from 125 to 90, and was largely absorbed by Yass, with the balance going to the new district of Burrangong.

== Members for Boorowa ==
Member	Party	Period
Thomas Slattery	None	1880–1887
Thomas Slattery	Protectionist	1887–1895
Kenneth Mackay	Protectionist	1895–1899
Niels Nielsen	Labor	1899–1904

== Election results ==
1901 New South Wales state election: Boorowa
Party	Candidate	Votes	%	±%
Labour	Niels Nielsen	1,128	76.2	+38.4
Ind. Progressive	Herbert O'Leary	352	23.8	
Total formal votes		1,480	98.9	+0.2
Informal votes		17	1.1	−0.2
Turnout		1,497	65.7	+4.7
Labour gain from Progressive				

Kenneth Mackay (Progressive) had been elected in 1898, however, he was appointed to the Legislative Council and Niels Nielsen (Labour) won the seat at the by-election.
