= Michael Fitzpatrick (Australian politician) =

Australian politician (1816–1881)

Michael Fitzpatrick (16 December 1816 – 10 December 1881) was a politician in colonial New South Wales, Australia.

Fitzpatrick was born at Parramatta and educated at a Roman Catholic school and at the Australian College, where he entered in January 1832, and carried off the highest prizes. After acting as tutor at the Normal Institution, he became a clerk in the Lands Department of New South Wales in October 1837, first-class clerk in 1846, and clerk of the Executive Council in 1851. Fitzpatrick was selected as the first under secretary for Lands and Works in 1856, on the introduction of responsible government. When these departments were divided, he held the office of under secretary for Lands until 1869, when he retired on a pension.

Fitzpatrick was member for Yass Plains in the New South Wales Legislative Assembly from 20 December 1869 to 10 December 1881 and colonial secretary in the Farnell ministry from 18 December 1877 to 20 December 1878.

Parliament of New South Wales
Political offices
| Preceded by Sir John Robertson | Colonial Secretary; 1877 – 1878 | Succeeded by Sir Henry Parkes |
New South Wales Legislative Assembly
| Preceded by Robert Isaacs | Member for Yass Plains; 1869 – 1881 | Succeeded by Louis Heydon |
