= Electoral district of Patrick's Plains =

Former state electoral district of New South Wales, Australia

Patrick's Plains was an electoral district of the Legislative Assembly in the Australian state of New South Wales created in 1859 and named after an old name for the Singleton area. In 1894, it was replaced by Singleton.

== Members for Patrick's Plains ==
Member	Party	Term
William Russell	None	1859–1860
William Lesley	None	1860–1861
Joseph Harpur	None	1861–1864
Bowie Wilson	None	1864–1869
James Hoskins	None	1869–1872
William Browne	None	1872–1880
John Brown	None	1880–1882
Albert Gould	None	1882–1887
Albert Gould	Free Trade	1887–1894

== Election results ==
1891 New South Wales colonial election: Patrick's Plains Friday 19 June
Party	Candidate	Votes	%	±%
Free Trade	Albert Gould (re-elected)	790	58.1	
Protectionist	Alfred De Lissa	570	41.9	
Total formal votes		1,360	99.3	
Informal votes		10	0.7	
Turnout		1,370	70.7	
Free Trade hold				
