= Niels Nielsen (politician) =

Politician and union official in New South Wales, Australia

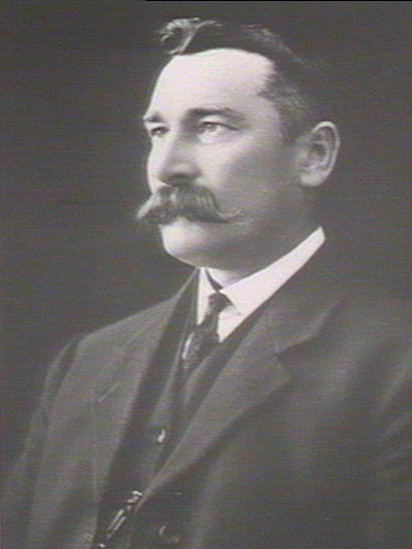
Niels Nielsen c 1911

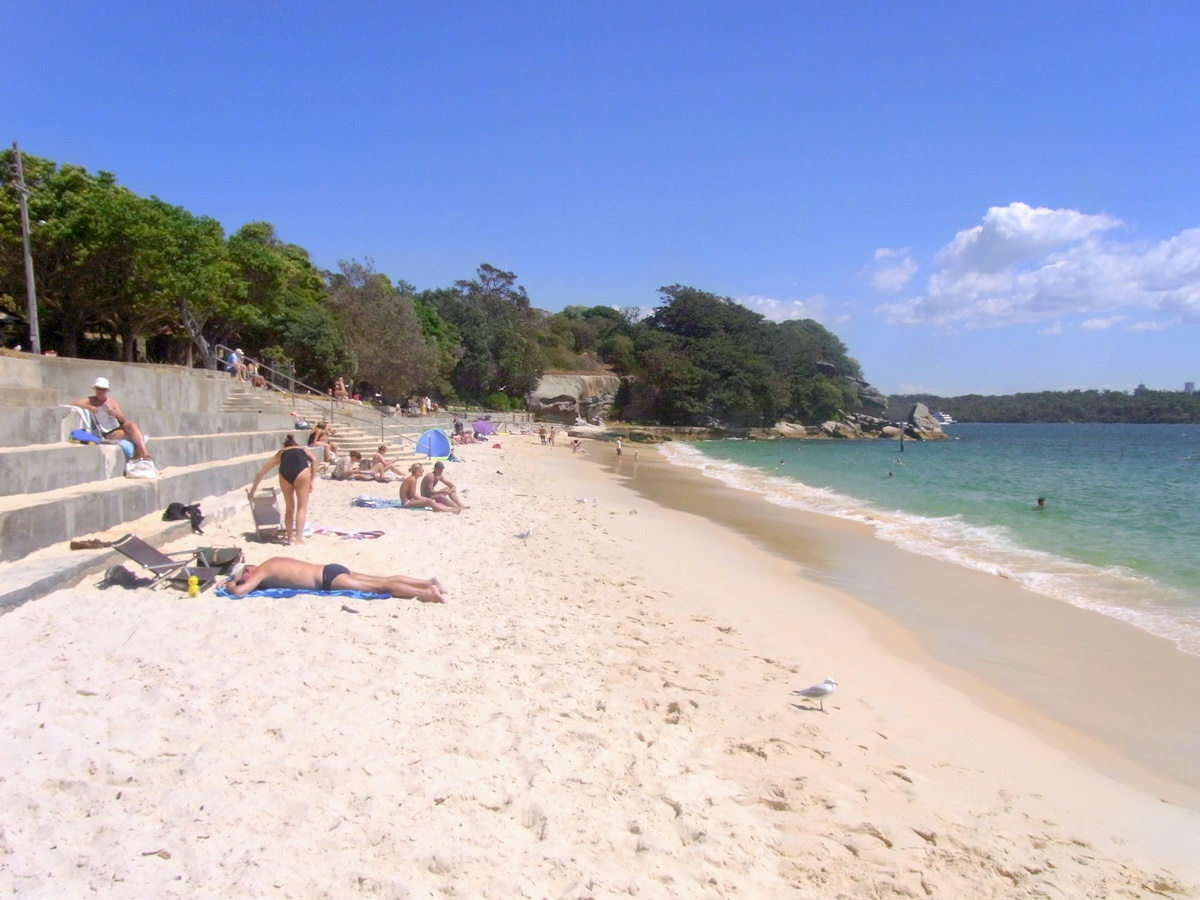
Nielsen Park in Sydney Harbour, named after Nielsen

Niels Rasmus Wilson Nielsen (2 March 1869 – 1 July 1930) was a Danish-born politician and union official in New South Wales, Australia.

== Life and career ==
He was born in Copenhagen to Niels Peter Nielsen and Susan Wilson. He arrived in Australia around 1874, becoming a carpenter and farmer near Young and a local officer of the Australian Workers' Union. Around 1888 he married Marie Booth in Yass; they had three daughters and three sons. He was elected to the New South Wales Legislative Assembly as the Labor member for Boorowa at the 1899 by-election. Boorowa was abolished in the 1904 re-distribution of electorates following the 1903 New South Wales referendum, which required the number of members of the Legislative Assembly to be reduced from 125 to 90, and was largely absorbed by Yass, with the balance going to the new district of Burrangong.

He transferred to Yass in 1904. In 1910 he was appointed Secretary for Lands in the McGowen ministry, the first state Labor government. Labor policy was that land should not be converted from leasehold to freehold. Nielsen drafted legislation to repeal the Land Conversion Act however this proved to be controversial, with extensive division in the Labor Party, resulting in Bill Dunn and Henry Hoyle resigning from parliament in July 1911, removing Labor's slim majority in the Legislative Assembly. Caucus dropped his legislation and Nielsen resigned from the ministry on 1 August 1911. Unable to regain ministerial office, he resigned his seat in 1913.

He was the New South Wales trade commission in San Francisco from 1913 and in 1916 as a conscriptionist left the Labor Party for the Nationalist Party. His position was terminated in 1917. He was chairman of the Taronga Park Trust from 1927 until his death at Gladesville on 1 July 1930 (aged 61), survived by his estranged wife Marie, three daughters and two sons.

Nielsen Park is named after him.

New South Wales Legislative Assembly
Preceded by Kenneth Mackay	Member for Boorowa; 1899–1904	District abolished
Preceded by William Affleck	Member for Yass; 1904–1913	Succeeded by Greg McGirr
Political offices
Preceded by Samuel Wilkinson Moore	Secretary for Lands; 1910–1911	Succeeded by Fred Flowers
