= Electoral district of Yass =

Former state electoral district of New South Wales, Australia

Yass was an electoral district of the Legislative Assembly in the Australian state of New South Wales between 1894 and 1920. It included the town of Yass. It largely replaced the electoral district of Yass Plains. In 1920, with the introduction of proportional representation, it was absorbed along with Burrangong into Cootamundra. It was recreated in 1930 and replaced by Burrinjuck in 1950.

== Members for Yass ==
First incarnation (1894—1920)
Member	Party	Term
William Affleck	Free Trade	1894–1901
William Affleck	Liberal Reform	1901–1904
Niels Nielsen	Labor	1904–1913
Greg McGirr	Labor	1913–1920
Second incarnation (1930—1950)
Member	Party	Term
George Ardill	Nationalist	1930–1931
George Ardill	United Australia	1931–1941
Bill Sheahan	Labor	1941–1950

== Election results ==
1947 New South Wales state election: Yass
Party	Candidate	Votes	%	±%
Labor	Bill Sheahan	8,393	60.4	−39.6
Country	John MacKay	3,957	28.5	+28.5
Liberal	Noel Barber	1,384	10.0	+10.0
Independent	John Cusack	163	1.2	+1.2
Total formal votes		13,897	99.0	
Informal votes		137	1.0	
Turnout		14,043	95.5	
Labor hold		Swing	N/A	

- Preferences were not distributed.
