= Robert Isaacs =

Australian politician

Robert McIntosh Isaacs
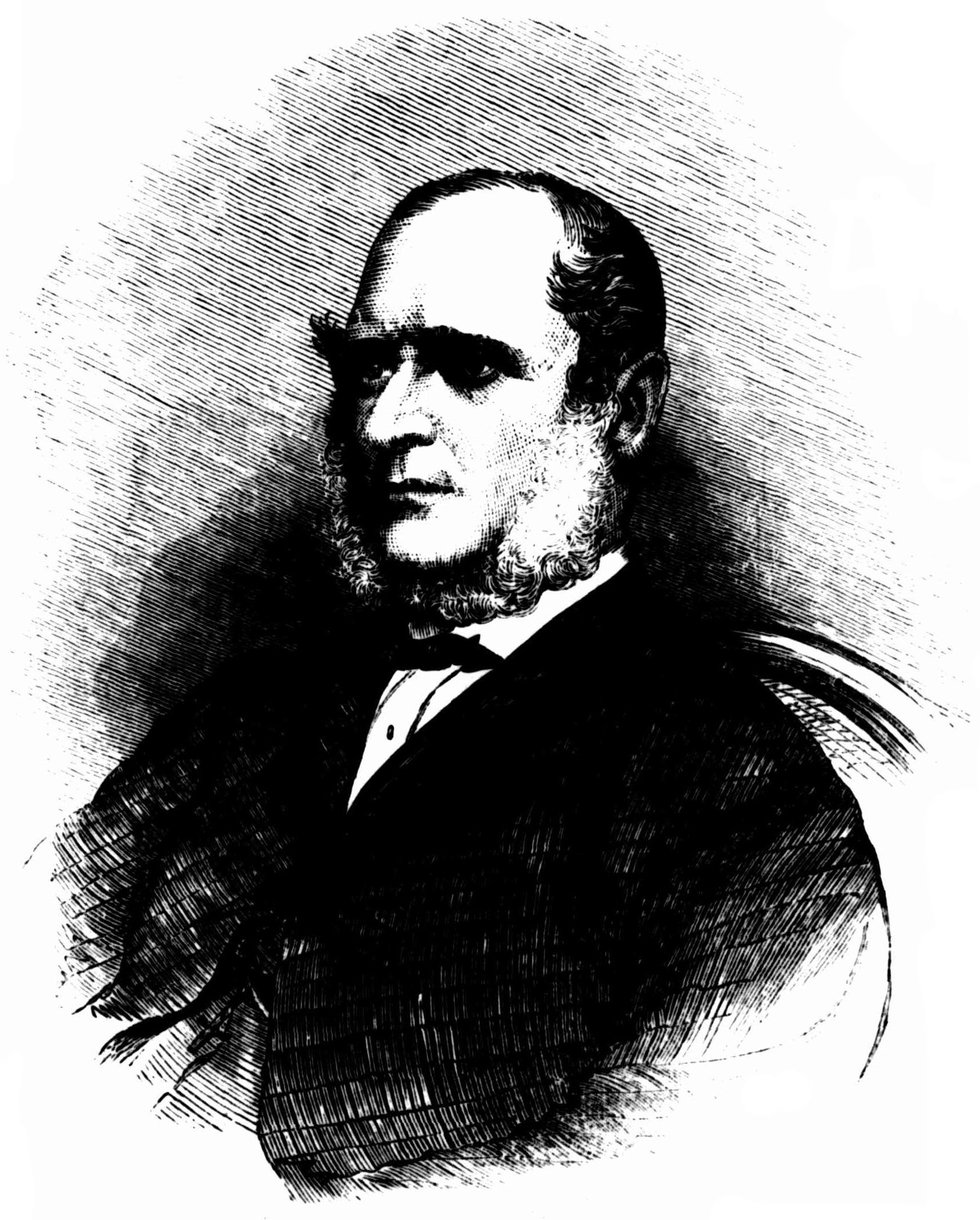

Member of the NSW Legislative Council
- In office 25 February 1857 – 10 May 1861

Member for Yass Plains
- In office 6 November 1865 – 15 November 1869
- Preceded by: Peter Faucett
- Succeeded by: Michael Fitzpatrick

Solicitor-General
- In office 22 January 1866 – 26 October 1868
- Preceded by: John Hargrave
- Succeeded by: Joshua Josephson

Personal details
- Born: 26 September 1815 Tortola, British Virgin Islands
- Died: 26 March 1876 (aged 61) Darlinghurst, New South Wales
- Spouse: Barberina (née Rogers-Harrison)
- Children: 4 daughters & 2 sons including Robert McIntosh Isaacs Jnr

Robert McIntosh Isaacs (26 September 1815 – 26 March 1876) was an Australian politician.

Robert M. Isaacs was born at Tortola in the British Virgin Islands, the son of Robert Glover Isaacs and Ann (née Frett). He was educated in England and called to the bar in 1839. On 27 July 1841, he married Barberina Rogers Harrison, with whom he had six children.

From about 1846, Isaacs practiced as a barrister on the island of Antigua in the West Indies, during which time he was a member of the Legislature. For a period, he filled the role of acting Chief Justice and for several years was Chancellor to the Bishop. Isaacs and his family left the West Indies at the end of 1854 for England. In October 1855, Isaacs and his family sailed from Liverpool for Australia aboard the clipper ship Schomberg on her maiden voyage, which was wrecked near Cape Otway on 27 December 1855. Isaacs, his wife and children were removed from the wreck and shortly afterwards came to Sydney.

A member of the New South Wales Legislative Council from 1857 to 1861, he refused appointment as Attorney-general. His period as member of the Upper House was "characterised by rather extreme views".

In 1865, he was elected to the New South Wales Legislative Assembly for Yass Plains, serving until his retirement in 1869. Isaacs was appointed as Solicitor-General in the second government of James Martin on 22 January 1866, and continued in that role until 26 October 1868. In 1871, he moved to Hobart to serve as chancellor of the Anglican archdiocese of Hobart, returning to Sydney in 1872 where he became Crown Prosecutor for the western districts. A conservative politically, he described himself as a Tory.

Isaacs died at his residence in Darlinghurst on 26 March 1876.

New South Wales Legislative Assembly
Preceded by Peter Faucett	Member for Yass Plains; 1865–1869	Succeeded by Michael Fitzpatrick
Political offices
Preceded by John Hargrave	Solicitor General; 1866 – 1868	Succeeded by Joshua Josephson
