= Electoral district of Yass Plains =

Former state electoral district of New South Wales, Australia

Yass Plains was an electoral district of the Legislative Assembly in the Australian state of New South Wales between 1859 and 1894. It largely replaced the electoral district of King and Georgiana. It was largely replaced by Yass in 1894.

== Members for Yass Plains ==
Member	Party	Term
Thomas Laidlaw	None	1859–1860
Henry O'Brien	None	1860–1861
Peter Faucett	None	1861–1865
Robert Isaacs	None	1865–1869
Michael Fitzpatrick	None	1869–1881
Louis Heydon	None	1882–1886
Thomas Colls	None	1886–1887
Thomas Colls	Protectionist	1887–1894

== Election results ==
1891 New South Wales colonial election: Yass Plains Wednesday 24 June
Party	Candidate	Votes	%	±%
Protectionist	Thomas Colls (re-elected)	709	56.7	
Free Trade	William Affleck	210	16.8	
Protectionist	Bernard Grogan	199	15.9	
Labour	Gustavus Herfort	132	10.6	
Total formal votes		1,250	97.7	
Informal votes		30	2.3	
Turnout		1,280	56.9	
Protectionist hold				
