= Electoral results for the district of Ashburnham =

Election results for Ashburnham, New South Wales, Australia

Ashburnham, an electoral district of the Legislative Assembly in the Australian state of New South Wales, had two incarnations, the first from 1894 to 1920, the second from 1927 to 1950.

First incarnation (1894–1920)
Election	Member	Party
1894	Albert Gardiner	Independent Labor
1895	Joseph Reymond	Protectionist
1898	Joseph Reymond	Protectionist
1901	Joseph Reymond	Progressive
1904	Eden George	Liberal Reform
1907	John Lynch	Labor
1910	John Lynch	Labor
1913	Arthur Grimm	Farmers and Settlers
1917	Arthur Grimm	Nationalist
Second incarnation (1927–1950)
Election	Member	Party
1927	Edmund Best	Nationalist
1930	William Keast	Labor
1932	Hilton Elliott	Country
1935	Hilton Elliott	Country
1938	Hilton Elliott	Country
1941	Edgar Dring	Labor
1944	Edgar Dring	Labor
1947	Edgar Dring	Labor

== Election results ==
=== Elections in the 1940s ===
==== 1947 ====
1947 New South Wales state election: Ashburnham
Party	Candidate	Votes	%	±%
Labor	Edgar Dring	6,472	47.5	−10.9
Liberal	Holman Cockram	3,671	26.9	+26.9
Country	Hilton Elliott	3,481	25.6	−16.0
Total formal votes		13,624	98.6	+0.6
Informal votes		194	1.4	
Turnout		13,818	95.9	+4.5
Two-party-preferred result
Labor	Edgar Dring	6,921	50.8	−7.6
Liberal	Holman Cockram	6,703	49.2	+49.2
Labor hold		Swing	−7.6	

==== 1944 ====
1944 New South Wales state election: Ashburnham
Party	Candidate	Votes	%	±%
Labor	Edgar Dring	7,418	58.4	+3.8
Country	Charles McCarron	5,278	41.6	−3.8
Total formal votes		12,696	98.0	−0.4
Informal votes		264	2.0	+0.4
Turnout		12,960	91.4	−2.8
Labor hold		Swing	+3.8	

==== 1941 ====
1941 New South Wales state election: Ashburnham
Party	Candidate	Votes	%	±%
Labor	Edgar Dring	7,367	54.6	
Country	Hilton Elliott	6,136	45.4	
Total formal votes		13,503	98.4	
Informal votes		220	1.6	
Turnout		13,723	94.2	
Labor gain from Country		Swing		

=== Elections in the 1930s ===
==== 1938 ====
1938 New South Wales state election: Ashburnham
Party	Candidate	Votes	%	±%
Country	Hilton Elliott	6,409	48.4	−4.5
Labor	Edgar Dring	5,779	43.6	−3.5
Independent	William Gibbons	1,065	8.0	+8.0
Total formal votes		13,253	98.7	−0.2
Informal votes		175	1.3	+0.2
Turnout		13,428	96.8	0.0
Two-party-preferred result
Country	Hilton Elliott	6,963	52.5	−0.4
Labor	Edgar Dring	6,290	47.5	+0.4
Country hold		Swing	−0.4	

==== 1935 ====
1935 New South Wales state election: Ashburnham
Party	Candidate	Votes	%	±%
Country	Hilton Elliott	6,986	52.9	+19.5
Labor (NSW)	William Keast	6,228	47.1	+5.4
Total formal votes		13,214	98.9	+0.4
Informal votes		150	1.1	−0.4
Turnout		13,364	96.8	−0.3
Country hold		Swing	−4.1	

==== 1932 ====
1932 New South Wales state election: Ashburnham
Party	Candidate	Votes	%	±%
Labor (NSW)	William Keast	5,211	41.7	−7.6
Country	Hilton Elliott	4,175	33.4	+33.4
United Australia	Eric Pryor	2,474	19.8	−18.4
Ind. United Australia	Edmund Best	631	5.1	+5.1
Total formal votes		12,491	98.5	0.0
Informal votes		189	1.5	0.0
Turnout		12,680	97.1	+2.0
Two-party-preferred result
Country	Hilton Elliott	7,124	57.0	+57.0
Labor (NSW)	William Keast	5,367	43.0	−7.4
Country gain from Labor (NSW)		Swing	N/A	

==== 1930 ====
1930 New South Wales state election: Ashburnham
Party	Candidate	Votes	%	±%
Labor	William Keast	5,941	49.3	
Nationalist	Edmund Best (defeated)	4,611	38.2	
Independent Country	David Kelly	1,512	12.5	
Total formal votes		12,064	98.5	
Informal votes		179	1.5	
Turnout		12,243	95.1	
Two-party-preferred result
Labor	William Keast	6,084	50.4	
Nationalist	Edmund Best	5,980	49.6	
Labor gain from Nationalist		Swing		

=== Elections in the 1920s ===
==== 1927 ====
1927 New South Wales state election: Ashburnham
Party	Candidate	Votes	%	±%
Nationalist	Edmund Best	7,063	58.8	
Labor	William Keast	4,954	41.2	
Total formal votes		12,017	98.4	
Informal votes		200	1.6	
Turnout		12,217	82.8	
Nationalist win		(new seat)		

==== 1920 - 1927 ====
District abolished

=== Elections in the 1910s ===
==== 1917 ====
1917 New South Wales state election: Ashburnham
Party	Candidate	Votes	%	±%
Nationalist	Arthur Grimm	4,169	54.9	+4.6
Labor	John Lynch	3,423	45.1	−4.6
Total formal votes		7,592	99.0	+1.5
Informal votes		78	1.0	−1.5
Turnout		7,670	72.6	−4.9
Nationalist hold		Swing	+4.6	

==== 1913 ====
1913 New South Wales state election: Ashburnham
Party	Candidate	Votes	%	±%
Farmers and Settlers	Arthur Grimm (Note: Also endorsed by Liberal Reform.)	3,999	50.3	
Labor	John Lynch	3,954	49.7	
Total formal votes		7,953	97.5	
Informal votes		205	2.5	
Turnout		8,158	77.5	
Farmers and Settlers gain from Labor				

==== 1910 ====
1910 New South Wales state election: Ashburnham
Party	Candidate	Votes	%	±%
Labour	John Lynch	3,349	53.4	
Liberal Reform	Reginald Weaver	2,917	46.6	
Total formal votes		6,266	98.2	
Informal votes		118	1.8	
Turnout		6,384	75.8	
Labour hold				

=== Elections in the 1900s ===
==== 1907 ====
1907 New South Wales state election: Ashburnham
Party	Candidate	Votes	%	±%
Labour	John Lynch	2,972	53.7	+22.3
Liberal Reform	Eden George	2,560	46.3	+10.9
Total formal votes		5,532	96.0	
Informal votes		231	4.0	
Turnout		5,763	74.0	
Labour gain from Liberal Reform		Swing	+5.7	

==== 1904 ====
1904 New South Wales state election: Ashburnham
Party	Candidate	Votes	%	±%
Liberal Reform	Eden George	1,832	35.4	
Independent	Joseph Reymond	1,721	33.2	
Labour	Patrick Clara	1,626	31.4	
Total formal votes		5,179	99.4	
Informal votes		29	0.6	
Turnout		5,208	68.7	
Liberal Reform gain from Progressive				

Ashburnham was one of two seats contested by 3 sitting members. (Note: The two seats contested by 3 sitting members were Ashburnham and The Lachlan.) The district lost parts to Belubula and absorbed parts of the abolished seats of Condoublin and Molong. Joseph Reymond had held the seat since the 1898 election as a member of the Progressive Party, however was standing as an independent. The member for Condoublin was Patrick Clara (Labour) and Eden George (Liberal Reform) was the member for the abolished seat of Sydney-Belmore. The member for Molong was Andrew Ross (Independent Liberal) who unsuccessfully contested Orange.

==== 1901 ====
1901 New South Wales state election: Ashburnham
Party	Candidate	Votes	%	±%
Progressive	Joseph Reymond	1,081	56.0	−2.2
Liberal Reform	Thomas Bavister	605	31.4	−10.4
Independent	Frank Calder	243	12.6	
Total formal votes		1,929	99.4	+0.3
Informal votes		12	0.6	−0.3
Turnout		1,941	68.3	+0.6
Progressive hold				

=== Elections in the 1890s ===
==== 1898 ====
1898 New South Wales colonial election: Ashburnham
Party	Candidate	Votes	%	±%
National Federal	Joseph Reymond	1,092	58.2	
Free Trade	Albert Gardiner	783	41.8	
Total formal votes		1,875	99.1	
Informal votes		18	1.0	
Turnout		1,893	67.6	
National Federal hold				

==== 1895 ====
1895 New South Wales colonial election: Ashburnham
Party	Candidate	Votes	%	±%
Protectionist	Joseph Reymond	672	44.0	
Free Trade	Albert Gardiner	534	35.0	
Labour	George Hutchinson	322	21.1	
Total formal votes		1,528	99.7	
Informal votes		5	0.3	
Turnout		1,533	70.1	
Protectionist gain from Free Trade				

==== 1894 ====
1894 New South Wales colonial election: Ashburnham
Party	Candidate	Votes	%	±%
Independent Labour	Albert Gardiner	577	31.9	
Protectionist	Alfred Stokes	530	29.3	
Ind. Free Trade	George Hutchinson	386	21.3	
Labour	John Hanney	195	10.8	
Ind. Free Trade	Thomas Spencer	121	6.7	
Total formal votes		1,809	97.9	
Informal votes		39	2.1	
Turnout		1,848	83.3	
Independent Labour win		(new seat)		
