= Electoral results for the district of Forbes =

Election results for Forbes, New South Wales, Australia

Forbes, an electoral district of the Legislative Assembly in the Australian state of New South Wales was created in 1880 and abolished in 1894.

election	Member	Party	Member	Party
1880	Henry Cooke	None	John Bodel	None
1882	Walter Coonan	None	Alfred Stokes	None
1885	Walter Coonan	None	Alfred Stokes	None
1887	Henry Cooke	Free Trade	Alfred Stokes	Protectionist
1889	Henry Cooke	Free Trade	Alfred Stokes	Protectionist
1891	Albert Gardiner	Labour	George Hutchinson	Labour

== Election results ==
=== Elections in the 1890s ===
==== 1891 ====
1891 New South Wales colonial election: Forbes Wednesday 24 June
Party	Candidate	Votes	%	±%
Labour	Albert Gardiner (elected 1)	1,030	27.9	
Labour	George Hutchinson (elected 2)	1,027	27.8	
Free Trade	Henry Cooke (defeated)	866	23.5	
Protectionist	Joseph Reymond	769	20.8	
Total formal votes		3,692	99.2	
Informal votes		29	0.8	
Turnout		2,200	61.3	
Labour gain 1 from Protectionist and gain 1 from Free Trade				

=== Elections in the 1880s ===
==== 1889 ====
1889 New South Wales colonial election: Forbes Wednesday 13 February
Party	Candidate	Votes	%	±%
Free Trade	Henry Cooke (elected 1)	730	27.1	
Protectionist	Alfred Stokes (elected 2)	715	26.6	
Protectionist	George Hutchinson	682	25.3	
Free Trade	Francis Cotton	565	21.0	
Total formal votes		2,692	99.6	
Informal votes		10	0.4	
Turnout		1,531	61.3	
Free Trade hold 1				
Protectionist hold 1				

==== 1887 ====
1887 New South Wales colonial election: Forbes Monday 14 February
Party	Candidate	Votes	%	±%
Protectionist	Alfred Stokes (re-elected 1)	788	36.6	
Free Trade	Henry Cooke (elected 2)	706	32.8	
Protectionist	Joseph Reymond	657	30.5	
Total formal votes		2,151	99.3	
Informal votes		16	0.7	
Turnout		1,273	52.8	

==== 1885 ====
1885 New South Wales colonial election: Forbes Thursday 22 October
Candidate	Votes	%
Alfred Stokes (re-elected 1)	765	37.5
Walter Coonan (re-elected 2)	647	31.7
Henry Cooke	627	30.8
Total formal votes	2,039	99.4
Informal votes	13	0.6
Turnout	1,300	52.8

==== 1882 ====
1882 New South Wales colonial election: Forbes Friday 8 December
Candidate	Votes	%
Walter Coonan (elected 1)	731	36.2
Alfred Stokes (elected 2)	649	32.1
Henry Cooke (defeated)	640	31.7
Total formal votes	2,020	98.9
Informal votes	23	1.1
Turnout	1,523	57.0

Sitting member John Bodel did not contest the election.

==== 1880 ====
1880 New South Wales colonial election: Forbes Saturday 27 November
Candidate	Votes	%
Henry Cooke (elected 1)	675	23.6
John Bodel (elected 2)	638	22.3
Walter Coonan (defeated)	631	22.0
Alfred Stokes	499	17.4
George Moore	336	11.7
Baker, St Baker	84	2.9
Total formal votes	2,863	99.0
Informal votes	30	1.0
Turnout	1,630	60.3
	(new seat)	

Forbes replaced part of The Bogan. Walter Coonan was the sitting member for The Bogan.
