= Electoral results for the district of Condoublin =

Election results for Condoublin, New South Wales, Australia

Condoublin, an electoral district of the Legislative Assembly in the Australian state of New South Wales was created in 1894 and abolished in 1904.

Election	Member	Party
1894	Thomas Brown	Independent Labour
1895	Thomas Brown	Labour
1898	Thomas Brown	Labour
1901	Patrick Clara	Labour
1901 by	Patrick Clara	Labour

== Election results ==
=== Elections in the 1910s ===
==== 1901 by-election ====
1901 Condoublin by-election Monday 4 November
Party	Candidate	Votes	%	±%
Labour	Patrick Clara (re-elected)	830	50.3	
Independent	Andrew Stewart	821	49.7	
Total formal votes		1,651	99.5	+0.2
Informal votes		9	0.5	−0.2
Turnout		1,660	59.9 (Note: Estimate based on a roll of 2,771 at the 1901 election.)	+2.0
Labour hold				

=== Elections in the 1900s ===
==== 1901 ====
1901 New South Wales state election: Condoublin
Party	Candidate	Votes	%	±%
Labour	Patrick Clara	575	36.1	−18.4
Independent	Andrew Stewart	560	35.1	
Independent Liberal	David Tasker	268	16.8	
Independent	William Nash	96	6.0	
Independent	William Wilkinson	95	6.0	
Total formal votes		1,594	99.3	−
Informal votes		11	0.7	−
Turnout		1,605	57.9	+3.3
Labour hold				

The election was overturned by the Elections and Qualifications Committee due to irregularities in the poll and Patrick Clara retained the seat for Labour at the subsequent by-election.

=== Elections in the 1890s ===
==== 1898 ====
1898 New South Wales colonial election: Condoublin
Party	Candidate	Votes	%	±%
Labour	Thomas Brown	754	54.5	
National Federal	Andrew Stewart	630	45.5	
Total formal votes		1,384	99.3	
Informal votes		10	0.7	
Turnout		1,394	54.6	
Labour hold				

==== 1895 ====
1895 New South Wales colonial election: Condoublin
Party	Candidate	Votes	%	±%
Labour	Thomas Brown	707	64.2	
Protectionist	Patrick Ryan	394	35.8	
Total formal votes		1,101	98.5	
Informal votes		17	1.5	
Turnout		1,118	55.9	
Member changed to Labour from Independent Labour				

==== 1894 ====
1894 New South Wales colonial election: Condoublin
Party	Candidate	Votes	%	±%
Independent Labour	Thomas Brown	622	48.6	
Protectionist	Patrick Ryan	394	30.8	
Ind. Free Trade	Henry Cooke	254	19.9	
Ind. Protectionist	Thomas Browne	9	0.7	
Total formal votes		1,279	97.4	
Informal votes		34	2.6	
Turnout		1,313	69.7	
Independent Labour win		(new seat)		
