= Electoral results for the district of Sydney-Belmore =

Election results for Sydney-Belmore, New South Wales, Australia

Sydney-Belmore, an electoral district of the Legislative Assembly in the Australian state of New South Wales, was created in 1894 and abolished in 1904.

Election	Member	Party
1894	James Graham	Free Trade
1895	James Graham	Free Trade
1898	James Graham	Free Trade
1901	Eden George	Progressive

== Election results ==
=== Elections in the 1900s ===
==== 1901 ====
1901 New South Wales state election: Sydney-Belmore
Party	Candidate	Votes	%	±%
Progressive	Eden George	715	49.6	+15.9
Liberal Reform	James Graham	672	46.6	−3.1
Labour	William Gocher	47	3.3	
Independent	John Donovan	8	0.6	
Total formal votes		1,442	98.8	−0.6
Informal votes		17	1.2	+0.6
Turnout		1,459	54.1	+2.1
Progressive gain from Liberal Reform				

=== Elections in the 1890s ===
==== 1898 ====
1898 New South Wales colonial election: Sydney-Belmore
Party	Candidate	Votes	%	±%
Free Trade	James Graham	582	49.7	
National Federal	Henry Hoyle	394	33.7	
Independent Federalist	Joseph Carlos	150	12.8	
Independent	Henry Foran	45	3.8	
Total formal votes		1,171	99.4	
Informal votes		7	0.6	
Turnout		1,178	52.1	
Free Trade hold				

==== 1895 ====
1895 New South Wales colonial election: Sydney-Belmore
Party	Candidate	Votes	%	±%
Free Trade	James Graham	674	56.2	
Protectionist	Francis Freehill	526	43.8	
Total formal votes		1,200	99.3	
Informal votes		8	0.7	
Turnout		1,208	64.8	
Free Trade hold				

==== 1894 ====
1894 New South Wales colonial election: Sydney-Belmore
Party	Candidate	Votes	%	±%
Free Trade	James Graham	448	28.9	
Ind. Protectionist	Francis Freehill	368	23.7	
Labour	Thomas Tytherleigh	333	21.4	
Ind. Free Trade	Edward Foxall	168	10.8	
Protectionist	Robert Mackay	121	7.8	
Ind. Protectionist	Joseph Purcell	67	4.3	
Ind. Protectionist	William Court	29	1.9	
Ind. Protectionist	George Perry	15	1.0	
Ind. Protectionist	Thomas Murray	4	0.3	
Total formal votes		1,553	97.9	
Informal votes		33	2.1	
Turnout		1,586	83.3	
Free Trade win		(new seat)		
