= Electoral results for the Division of Canobolas =

Australian federal elections in the Edwardian-era NSW constituency

This is a list of electoral results for the Division of Canobolas in Australian federal elections from the division's creation in 1901 until its abolition in 1906.

== Members ==
Member	Party	Term
Thomas Brown	Labor	1901—1906

== Election results ==
=== Elections in the 1900s ===
==== 1903 ====
1903 Australian federal election: Canobolas
Party	Candidate	Votes	%	±%
Labour	Thomas Brown	unopposed		
Labour hold		Swing		

==== 1901 ====
1901 Australian federal election: Canobolas
Party	Candidate	Votes	%	±%
Labour	Thomas Brown	4,120	54.2	+54.2
Protectionist	Bernhard Wise	3,278	43.1	+43.1
Ind. Protectionist	William Melville	153	2.0	+2.0
Ind. Protectionist	Thomas Dalveen	54	0.7	+0.7
Total formal votes		7,605	98.5	
Informal votes		112	1.5	
Turnout		7,717	70.0	
Labour win		(new seat)		
