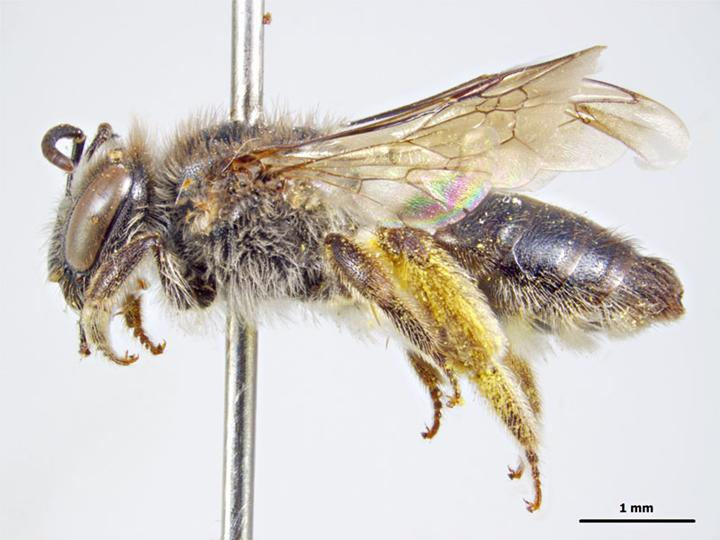
- Female

Scientific classification
- Kingdom: Animalia
- Phylum: Arthropoda
- Clade: Pancrustacea
- Class: Insecta
- Order: Hymenoptera
- Family: Colletidae
- Genus: Leioproctus
- Species: L. capillatus

Binomial name
- Leioproctus capillatus (Rayment, 1935)

Synonyms
- Paracolletes (Heterocolletes) capillatus Rayment, 1935

= Leioproctus capillatus =

Species of bee

Leioproctus capillatus, or Leioproctus (Leioproctus) capillatus, is a species of bee in the family Colletidae and subfamily Colletinae. It is endemic to Australia. It was described by Australian entomologist Tarlton Rayment in 1935.

== Description ==
Female body length is about 11 mm, the male 10 mm. Integumental colouration is mainly black; the hair white through pale brown to golden.

== Distribution and habitat ==
The species occurs in south-eastern Australia. The type locality is Wilsons Promontory. Other published localities in Victoria include Emerald and Mount Buffalo, as well as Mount Canobolas in New South Wales.

== Behaviour ==
The adults are flying mellivores. Flowering plants visited by the bees include Leptospermum species.

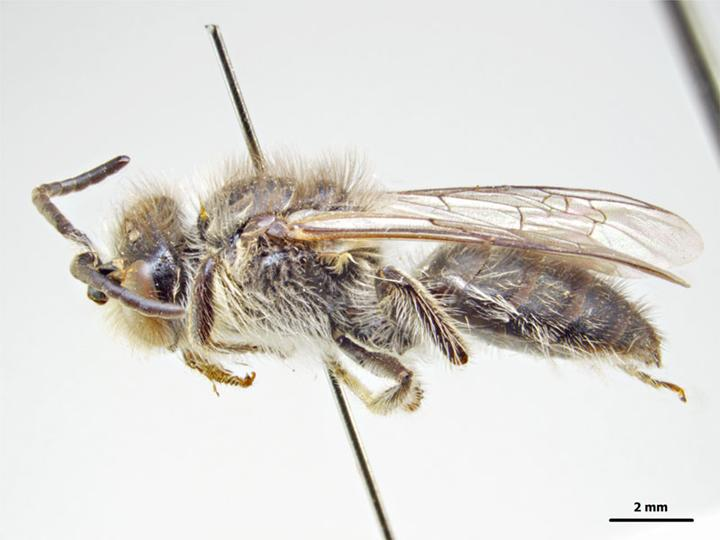
Male
