= George Hutchinson (politician) =

Australian politician

George Fairhurst Hutchinson
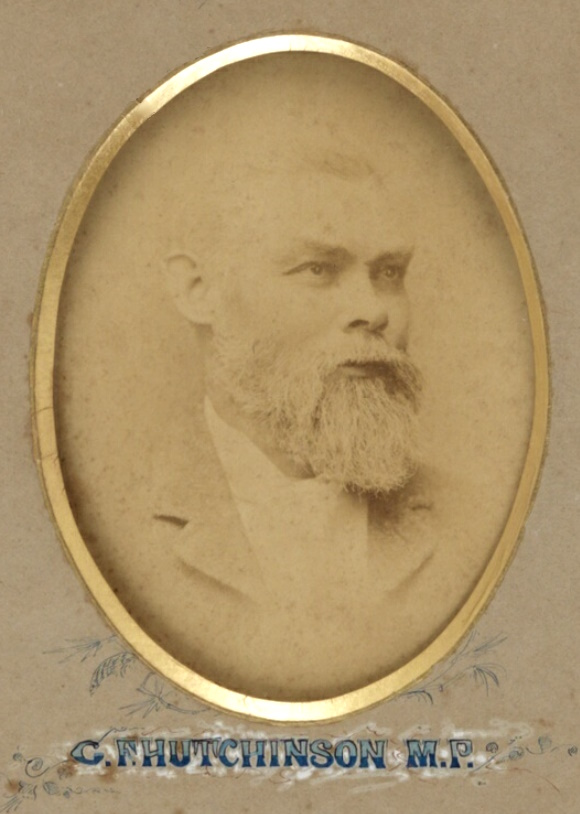

Member for Forbes (NSW Legislative Assembly)
- In office 24 June 1891 – 25 June 1894

Personal details
- Born: 7 February 1844 Canterbury, New South Wales
- Died: 23 November 1923 (aged 79) North Sydney, New South Wales
- Spouse(s): (1) Mary Detores (2) Emily Gilligan
- Parents: Edward Hutchinson (father); Mary (née ---) (mother)

George Fairhurst Hutchinson (7 February 1844 – 23 November 1923) was an Australian politician and a longtime resident of Forbes, on the Lachlan River.

From 1862 Hutchinson established himself at Forbes as a saddler. He was elected as an alderman in 1872 and served as mayor of the township on multiple occasions. From June 1891 to June 1894 Hutchinson represented the electorate of Forbes in the New South Wales Legislative Assembly. Though he campaigned as a supporter of protectionism, he joined the Labour Electoral League after the election (becoming one of an initial group of Labor Party members in parliament). Hutchinson opposed the solidarity pledge (made compulsory at a Labour League conference in November 1893). He contested the 1894 election as an independent for the newly-formed Ashburnham electorate, but was defeated. He rejoined the Labour Electoral League, signed the pledge and contested the 1895 general election as a Labour candidate, but was once again defeated. From 1897 to March 1910 Hutchinson was the publican of the Australia Hotel at Forbes.

== Biography ==
=== Early years ===
George Fairhurst Hutchinson was born on 7 February 1844 at Canterbury, a south-western suburb of Sydney, the son of Edward and Mary Hutchinson. His father was a station manager.

In about 1850, when George was aged six, his father died, an event that "left the family in very poor circumstances". George's education was "therefore necessarily brief", made up of a year at Beechworth in north-east Victoria and slightly less than a year at St. James School in Melbourne. Much of his subsequent study was carried out in his spare time at home as he began to earn his own living at an early age.

In his younger days Hutchinson experienced many of the 'ups and downs' of life, being engaged in a variety of occupations including fencing, butchery, bullock driving, and mining.

=== Forbes ===
Hutchinson began an apprenticeship as a saddler in Victoria. In 1862 he travelled from Chiltern in north-east Victoria to the Lachlan goldfields in New South Wales. At Forbes he completed his apprenticeship as a saddler under the supervision of John Pendlebury.

In 1866 George Hutchinson was married to Mary Detores, the only daughter of Joseph Detores, a shoe and bootmaker of Forbes. The couple had four children, three sons and a daughter, born from 1867 to 1873.

Hutchinson's employer, John Pendlebury, died in July 1871 after which Hutchinson took over the management of the business on behalf of Pendlebury's widow. Hutchinson's saddlery and harness-making business was located at the corner of Lachlan and Templar streets in Forbes, but later it was relocated to Rankin Street.

Forbes was incorporated as a municipal district in April 1870. In 1872 Hutchinson was elected as an alderman of the Forbes Municipal Council. With the exception of one year, when he was absent from the township in the back country, he was elected alderman of the local council until at least the early 1890s.

Mary, the wife of George Hutchinson, died on 17 November 1874, aged 25, at the family residence in Rankin Street, Forbes.

In June 1877 George Hutchinson was placed under sequestration by the Insolvency Court, with goods seized under a bill of sale, the cause being attributed to "dullness of trade". After meetings were held establishing proofs of debt, a plan of distribution of Hutchinson's estate was finally filed in the office of the Registrar in Insolvency in April 1879.

George Hutchinson was married to Emily Gilligan in 1877 (his second marriage). The couple had eleven children, four sons and seven daughters, born from 1878 to 1904.

In 1881 Hutchinson was elected mayor of Forbes. After taking on the role he found that the arrears of council rates had been allowed to accumulate and vigorous action was initiated to compel the payment of overdue rates. By the end of his term in office "the finances of the municipality were in a flourishing condition". During Hutchinson's mayoralty a scheme was devised for supplying Forbes with water by steam power and gravitation, though work did not commence until the following year. The scheme was effective and inexpensive, carried out by the council without requiring Government assistance. Hutchinson was re-elected as mayor in 1884.

In 1885 Hutchinson was appointed as a member of both the Forbes and Parkes land boards. In 1886 he was gazetted as a justice of the peace. Hutchinson was elected mayor in 1887.

=== Political career ===
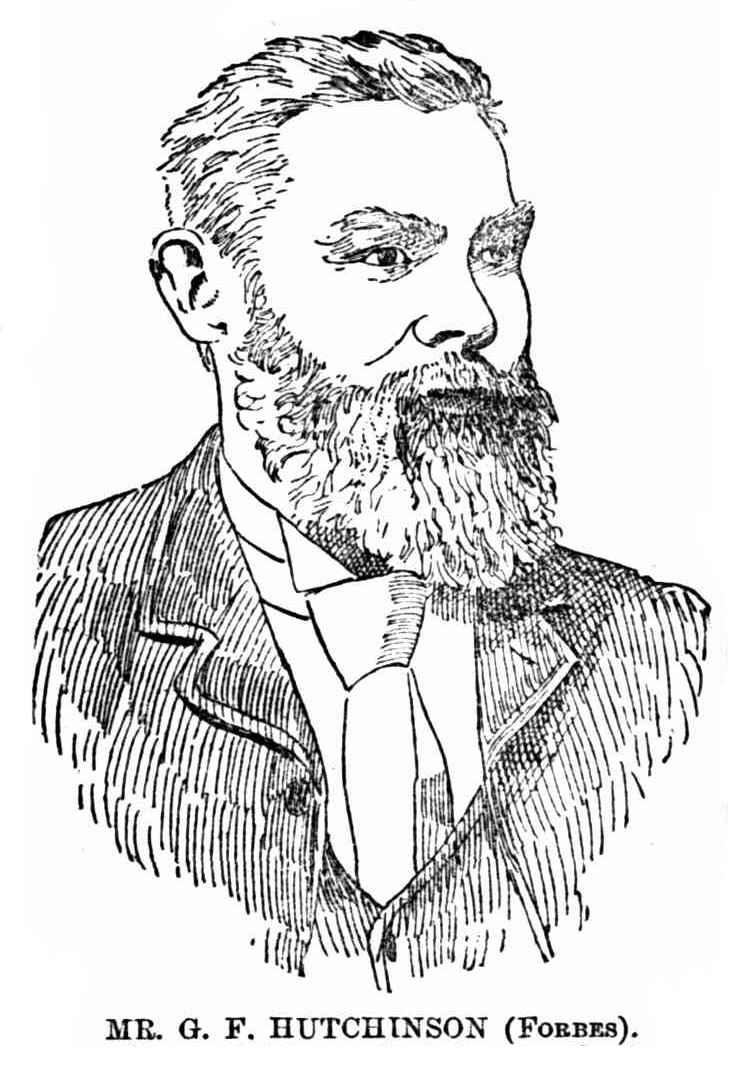
Illustration of George Hutchinson, published in Evening News (Sydney), 23 July 1891.

At the general election of 1889, held in February 1889, Hutchinson was nominated as a candidate for the Forbes electorate in the New South Wales Legislative Assembly, at that time represented by two members of parliament. Hutchinson stood as a protectionist. His opponents were one other protectionist candidate and two supporters of free trade. At the election held on 13 February Hutchinson polled third, gaining 682 votes (25.3 percent), thirty-three votes short of the other protectionist candidate. Those elected were Henry Cooke, of the Free Trade Party, and Alfred Stokes, of the Protectionist Party.

Hutchinson was elected mayor of Forbes in 1889 and 1890. He continued to serve as an alderman up to the time he was elected to the colonial parliament in July 1891.

At the general election of 1891, held in June and early July 1891, Hutchinson was once again nominated as a candidate for the Forbes electorate, running as a supporter of protectionism. One of the sitting members, Alfred Stokes, did not contest the election, so the other candidates were the other sitting member, Henry Cooke, the Labour Electoral League candidate Albert Gardiner and another protectionist candidate. In a closely fought contest Hutchinson polled second, just four votes behind Gardiner, the Labour candidate. After the election Hutchinson joined the Labour Electoral League, so the Forbes electorate was then represented by two Labour candidates.

In September 1893 the Electoral Districts Commissioners presented their scheme of redistribution of seats under the new Electoral Act before the New South Wales Legislative Assembly. As part of the process, multi-member electorates were abolished and the electorates were realigned and in some cases renamed. The new electorate of Ashburnham included the townships of Forbes, Parkes and Eugowra.

In January 1894, on a visit to Parkes, Hutchinson stated that, although he had joined the Labour Electoral League after being elected in 1891, he would not seek Labour League nomination at the next election. He decided he would contest the Ashburnham electorate as an independent, even though "he is as much a labour man as ever". Hutchinson explained that he "strongly disapproves of the decision of the recent labour conference seeking to compel individual members to vote according to a majority vote of members in caucus".

For the 1894 general election Hutchinson was nominated as an independent free trade candidate for the newly-created Ashburnham electorate. The election was held on 17 July 1894. Hutchinson was defeated, polling second behind Albert Gardiner.

In September 1894 "number of gentlemen" met at the Criterion Hotel to present George Hutchinson with "an illuminated address and a purse of sovereigns" on the eve of his departure from Forbes. During the evening "speeches of a eulogistic character were made by several gentlemen".

Prior to the 1895 general election Hutchinson had rejoined the Labour Electoral League and was nominated as the Labour candidate for the Ashburnham electorate after having signed the pledge. In a speech to the electors at Parkes prior to the election, Hutchinson "sought at some length to justify his action in having signed the solidarity pledge". His opponents were Gardiner, running as a Free Trade Party candidate, and Joseph Reymond for the Protectionist Party. At the election held on 24 July 1895 Hutchinson received the least number of votes, in a contest won by the protectionist candidate, Joseph Reymond. Hutchinson had his election expenses paid by supporters at Forbes.

=== Later years ===
Despite having departed from Forbes in September 1894, Hutchinson later returned to the township. By 1896 he was once again elected as an alderman in the municipal council.

Hutchinson was granted a publicans' license for the Australia Hotel in Lachlan Street, Forbes, for the period July 1897 to June 1898. In May 1899 it was reported that John Bodel, the owner of the Australia Hotel on the corner of Lachlan and Templar streets in Forbes, was intending to replace the old wooden building with a more substantial structure. The wooden building had been built in 1862 and was initially used as a store before being converted to a hotel. It was planned to extend the brick portion of the building to a two-storey structure encompassing the entire street corner. In June 1899 Hutchinson's publicans' license for the Australia Hotel was renewed.

Hutchinson was elected as mayor in both 1899 and 1901. He served as mayor of Forbes on twelve occasions throughout his life.

In March 1910 it was reported that P. McDermott had purchased "the goodwill" of the Australia Hotel from Hutchinson.

Hutchinson left Forbes in about 1910 and settled in Sydney.

George Fairhurst Hutchinson died on 23 November 1923 at North Sydney.

New South Wales Legislative Assembly
Preceded by Henry Cooke; Alfred Stokes	Member for Forbes; 1891–1894; Served alongside: Albert Gardiner	Abolished
