= 1901 Condoublin state by-election =

Election result for Condoublin, New South Wales, Australia

A by-election was held for the New South Wales Legislative Assembly electorate of Condoublin on 4 November 1901 because the 1901 election for Condoublin was overturned by the Elections and Qualifications Committee due to irregularities in the poll. Patrick Clara had defeated Andrew Stewart by 15 votes however 30 people were prevented from voting at Bulgandramine.

== Dates ==
Date	Event
3 July 1901	Poll conducted
28 August 1901	Andrew Stewart lodged a petition against the election.
10 October 1901	Election of Patrick Clara declared to be void.
11 October 1901	Writ of election issued by the Speaker of the Legislative Assembly.
22 October 1901	Nominations
4 November 1901	Polling day
21 November 1901	Return of writ

== Result ==
1901 Condoublin by-election Monday 4 November
Party	Candidate	Votes	%	±%
Labour	Patrick Clara (re-elected)	830	50.3	
Independent	Andrew Stewart	821	49.7	
Total formal votes		1,651	99.5	+0.2
Informal votes		9	0.5	−0.2
Turnout		1,660	59.9 (Note: Estimate based on a roll of 2,771 at the 1901 election.)	+2.0
Labour hold				

== See also ==
- Electoral results for the district of Condoublin
- List of New South Wales state by-elections
