= Division of Canobolas =

Former Australian federal electoral division

Canobolas Australian House of Representatives Division
- Created: 1901
- Abolished: 1906
- Namesake: Mount Canobolas

The Division of Canobolas was an Australian electoral division in the state of New South Wales. The division was proclaimed in 1900, and was one of the original 65 divisions to be contested at the first federal election. It was abolished in 1906, when the Division of Calare was created. It was named after Mount Canobolas (an Aboriginal word meaning "two peaks"). It was located in central western New South Wales, including the towns of Forbes, Orange and Parkes. It was held by the Australian Labor Party throughout its existence.

== Members ==
Image	Member	Party	Term	Notes
	Thomas Brown (1861–1934)	Labour	29 March 1901 – 12 December 1906	Previously held the New South Wales Legislative Assembly seat of Condoublin. Transferred to the Division of Calare after Canobolas was abolished in 1906
