= Electoral district of Forbes =

Former state electoral district of New South Wales, Australia

Forbes was an electoral district of the Legislative Assembly in the Australian state of New South Wales, created in 1880, replacing Lachlan, and named after and including Forbes. In 1894, with the abolition of multi-member electorates, it was abolished and replaced by Lachlan and Condoublin.

== Members for Forbes ==
Member	Party	Term	Member	Party	Term
Henry Cooke	None	1880–1882	John Bodel	None	1880–1882
Walter Coonan	None	1882–1887	Alfred Stokes	None	1882–1887
Henry Cooke	Free Trade	1887–1891	Alfred Stokes	Protectionist	1887–1891
Albert Gardiner	Labour	1891–1894	George Hutchinson	Labour	1891–1894

== Election results ==
1891 New South Wales colonial election: Forbes Wednesday 24 June
Party	Candidate	Votes	%	±%
Labour	Albert Gardiner (elected 1)	1,030	27.9	
Labour	George Hutchinson (elected 2)	1,027	27.8	
Free Trade	Henry Cooke (defeated)	866	23.5	
Protectionist	Joseph Reymond	769	20.8	
Total formal votes		3,692	99.2	
Informal votes		29	0.8	
Turnout		2,200	61.3	
Labour gain 1 from Protectionist and gain 1 from Free Trade				
