= William Keast (New South Wales politician) =

Australian politician

Theophilus William John Keast (6 June 1872 – 16 September 1938) was an Australian politician. He was a Labor Party member of the New South Wales Legislative Assembly from 1930 to 1932, representing the electorate of Ashburnham.

Keast was born at Creswick in Victoria, but moved with his family to Parkes at an early age. He worked as an engine driver for a period, during which time he lost an eye in an accident. He operated a bakery from 1903 to 1910, when he sold out and established another bakery at Bogan Gate. He worked as a stock and station agent from 1914 to 1918; from 1918 onwards he was a farmer at Bogan Gate. He was an alderman of the Parkes Shire Council from 1925 until 1931 and 1933 until 1938, serving as mayor from 1929 to 1930. He also served for a time as chairman of the Parkes District Hospital Board.

Keast was preselected to contest the newly recreated seat of Ashburnham for Labor at the 1927 state election, but was defeated by Edmund Best, then the MLA for Murrumbidgee. He recontested the seat at the 1930 election, and defeated Best amidst Labor's landslide victory under Jack Lang. His time in politics was to be short-lived, however; the Lang government was sacked by the state Governor in 1932, and Keast was one of many Labor MLAs to lose at the subsequent election. He attempted to regain the seat in 1935, but was again unsuccessful.

Keast died at Parkes in 1938.

New South Wales Legislative Assembly
Preceded by Edmund Best	Member for Ashburnham; 1930 – 1932	Succeeded by Hilton Elliott
