= Hilton Elliott =

Australian politician

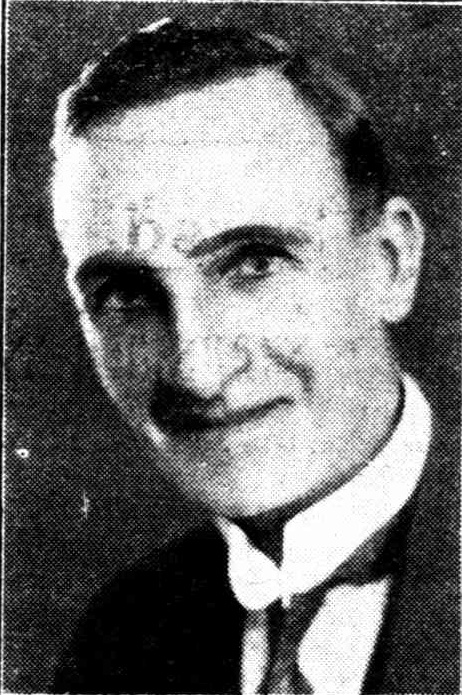
Mr Hilton Oswald Elliott

Hilton Oswald Elliott (15 June 1885 – 28 April 1960) was an Australian politician.

He was born in Forbes, the second son of Joseph Elliott, a local farmer. He was educated in local primary schools before working on the family farm, creating his own property, "Fairfield", in 1906 near Mulyandry. Around 1912 he married Eva Maud Chandler at Blayney, with whom he had five children.

He was elected to Jemalong Shire Council in 1917, serving until 1925 (president 1920, 1923). From 1921 to 1922 he was a member of the Farmers' and Settlers' Association of New South Wales's executive, and in 1927 he travelled around the United States and Canada.

In 1932 he was elected to the New South Wales Legislative Assembly as the Country Party member for Ashburnham. He served until he was defeated in 1941. He contested the seat again at the 1947 election but was unsuccessful.

Elliott retired to Forbes in 1949, dividing his property between his sons, and in 1955 was elected to Forbes Municipal Council, serving as mayor in 1956 before retiring from politics for good. Elliott died at Forbes on 28 April 1960 (aged 74).

New South Wales Legislative Assembly
Preceded by William Keast	Member for Ashburnham; 1932–1941	Succeeded by Edgar Dring
