= John Lynch (New South Wales politician) =

Australian politician (1875–1944)

John Patrick Lynch (6 February 1875 – 2 June 1944) was an Australian politician.

== Biography ==
Lynch was born on 6 February 1875, near Parkes, to miner William Sullivan Lynch and Mary Seymour. He attended local public schools and became a schoolteacher, working at Parkes from 1895 to 1897 and at various country schools thereafter. In 1907, he was elected to the New South Wales Legislative Assembly as the Labor member for Ashburnham. He served until his defeat in 1913. Subsequently, he became a commercial agent and hotel manager. On 3 June 1922, he married Florence Staub. Lynch died on 2 June 1943, aged 69, in St Leonards.

New South Wales Legislative Assembly
Preceded by Eden George	Member for Ashburnham; 1907–1913	Succeeded by Arthur Grimm
