= Walter Coonan =

Australian actor

Walter Thomas Coonan (1853 – 4 October 1926) was an Australian actor.

He was born in Hobart to gaol warder Thomas Coonan and Ann Birmingham. A solicitor before entering politics, he practised at West Wyalong and Waverley. He was married three times: firstly on 7 May 1879 to Harriett Elizabeth Hollingdale; secondly on 15 December 1901 to Rebecca Agnes Wales, whom he later divorced; and thirdly to Isabella Jane Peterson. None of these marriages produced children. In 1877 he was elected to the New South Wales Legislative Assembly for Bogan, but he was defeated in 1880. He returned as the member for Forbes in 1882 and was re-elected in 1885, but did not contest the 1887 election. Coonan died in 1926.

New South Wales Legislative Assembly
Preceded by George Lord	Member for Bogan; 1877–1880	Succeeded by George Cass; Patrick Jennings
Preceded by John Bodel; Henry Cooke	Member for Forbes; 1882–1887; Served alongside: Alfred Stokes	Succeeded by Henry Cooke
