= Alfred Stokes =

English-born Australian politician

Alfred Stokes (1835 – 15 June 1914) was an English-born Australian politician.

He was born in Somerset to publican John Stokes and Sarah Leonard. He arrived in Victoria around 1856, mining at Ballarat and Bendigo before moving to New South Wales some time around 1860. On 27 October 1857 he married Mary Ann Glancey; they had eight children. Having settled in Forbes, he became a successful hotel and property owner. In 1882 he was elected to the New South Wales Legislative Assembly as the member for Forbes. He served until 1891, when he retired. Stokes died at Orange in 1914.

New South Wales Legislative Assembly
Preceded by John Bodel; Henry Cooke	Member for Forbes; 1882–1891; Served alongside: Walter Coonan/Henry Cooke	Succeeded by Albert Gardiner; George Hutchinson
