= Electoral district of Sydney-Belmore =

Former state electoral district of New South Wales, Australia

Sydney-Belmore was an electoral district for the Legislative Assembly in the Australian state of New South Wales from 1894 to 1904. It was named after Earl Belmore who was Governor of New South Wales from 1868 until 1872.

== Members for Sydney-Belmore ==
Member	Party	Term
James Graham	Free Trade	1894–1901
Eden George	Progressive	1901–1904

== History ==
Multi-member constituencies were abolished in the 1893 redistribution, resulting in the creation of 76 new districts, including Sydney-Belmore. Sydney-Belmore consisted of a northern part of the four member district of South Sydney. It was in northern Surry Hills bounded by Liverpool Street, and Oxford Street in the north, Riley Street in the east, Foveaux Street in the south and Elizabeth Street in the west. In 1904, its name was changed to Belmore.

== Election results ==
1901 New South Wales state election: Sydney-Belmore
Party	Candidate	Votes	%	±%
Progressive	Eden George	715	49.6	+15.9
Liberal Reform	James Graham	672	46.6	−3.1
Labour	William Gocher	47	3.3	
Independent	John Donovan	8	0.6	
Total formal votes		1,442	98.8	−0.6
Informal votes		17	1.2	+0.6
Turnout		1,459	54.1	+2.1
Progressive gain from Liberal Reform				
