= James Graham (physician) =

Australian physician and politician (1856–1913)

Sir James Graham
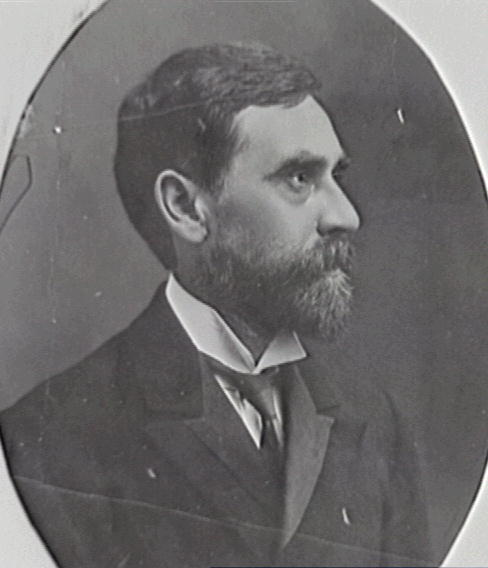
- Graham in 1901

38th Mayor of Sydney
- In office 1901–1901
- Preceded by: Sir Matthew Harris
- Succeeded by: Thomas Hughes

Personal details
- Born: 29 July 1856 Edinburgh, Scotland
- Died: 8 March 1913 (aged 56)

Sir James Graham (29 July 1856 – 8 March 1913) was a Scottish-born physician and politician, active in Australia. He was Mayor of Sydney in 1901.

Graham was born in Edinburgh, son of Thomas Graham, marble polisher, and his wife Jane ( née Square).

In 1906 Graham opposed Chris Watson for the federal seat of South Sydney but was defeated.

New South Wales Legislative Assembly
Preceded by New district	Member for Sydney-Belmore; 1894–1901	Succeeded by Eden George
Preceded by Albert Bruntnell	Member for Surry Hills; 1907–1910	Succeeded by Henry Hoyle
Civic offices
Preceded by Sir Matthew Harris	Mayor of Sydney; 1901	Succeeded by Thomas Hughes
