= Eden George =

Australian and New Zealand politician

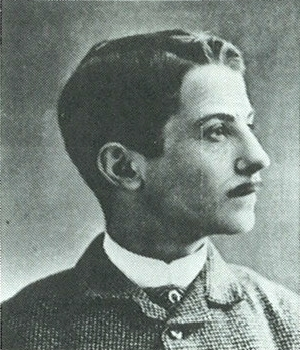
- Eden George (year unknown)

Member of the New South Wales Parliament for Sydney-Belmore
- In office 1901–1904
- Preceded by: James Graham
- Succeeded by: Constituency abolished

Member of the New South Wales Parliament for Ashburnham
- In office 1904–1907
- Preceded by: Joseph Reymond
- Succeeded by: John Lynch

19th Mayor of Christchurch
- In office 21 December 1892 – 20 December 1893
- Preceded by: William Prudhoe
- Succeeded by: Thomas Gapes

Personal details
- Born: 18 September 1863 Forbes, New South Wales
- Died: 2 May 1927 (aged 63) Manly, New South Wales
- Party: Progressive Party; Liberal Reform Party
- Spouse: Ada Jane Butler
- Profession: Photographer

Ernest Eden George (18 September 1863 – 2 May 1927), known as Eden George, was born in New South Wales and came to New Zealand as a young man. He made his career in photography and was active in Auckland and Dunedin, but mainly in Christchurch. Entrepreneurial, combative and confrontational, he entered the political scene. In his early life, he stood at five elections to the New Zealand Parliament, but he came last at every occasion. Surprisingly, he was elected Mayor of Christchurch in 1892 without, unlike all his predecessors, having ever served as a councillor on Christchurch City Council before. He had a most difficult year, was soundly beaten at the next election and told councillors that they "should forget him, as he would forget them". Indeed, in 1906, his was the only photo of all the city's ex mayors that was not on display in the mayor's office.

After a short period in Auckland, George moved to Australia, where he continued his career as a photographer. He was a member of the New South Wales Legislative Assembly for six years. After his defeat, he travelled extensively.

== Early life ==
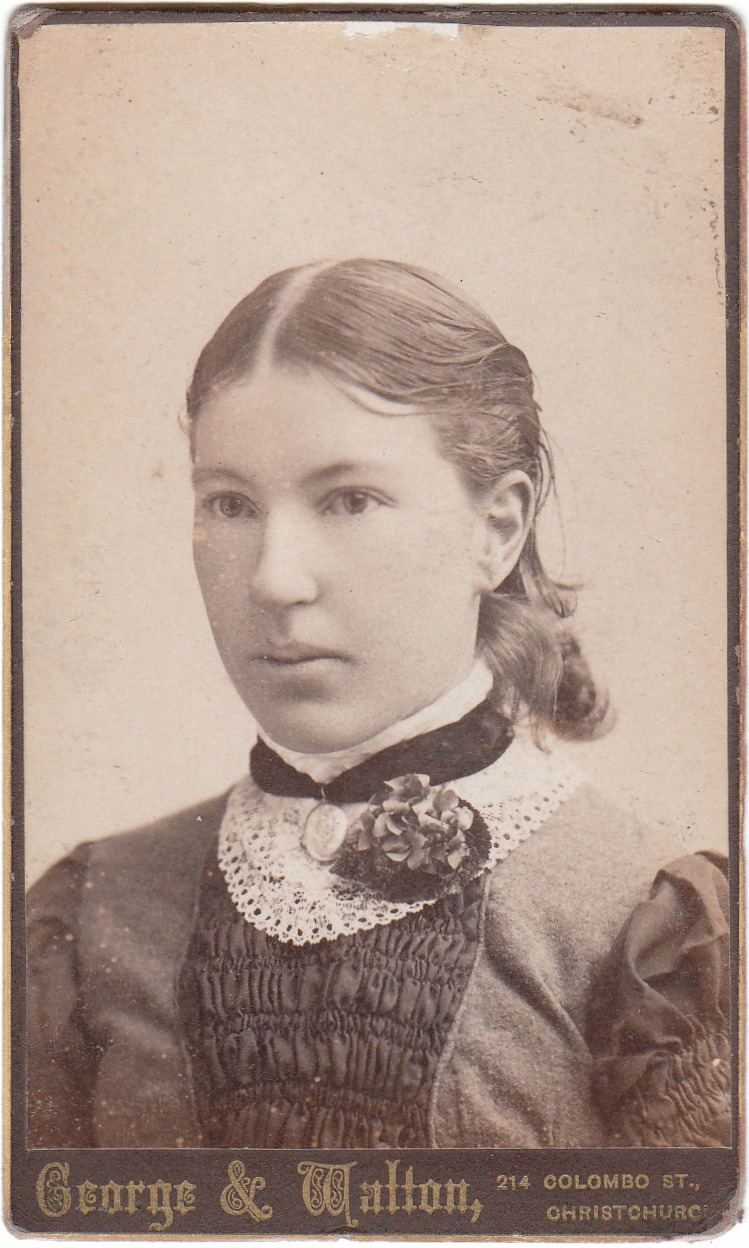
Carte de visite produced by George & Walton

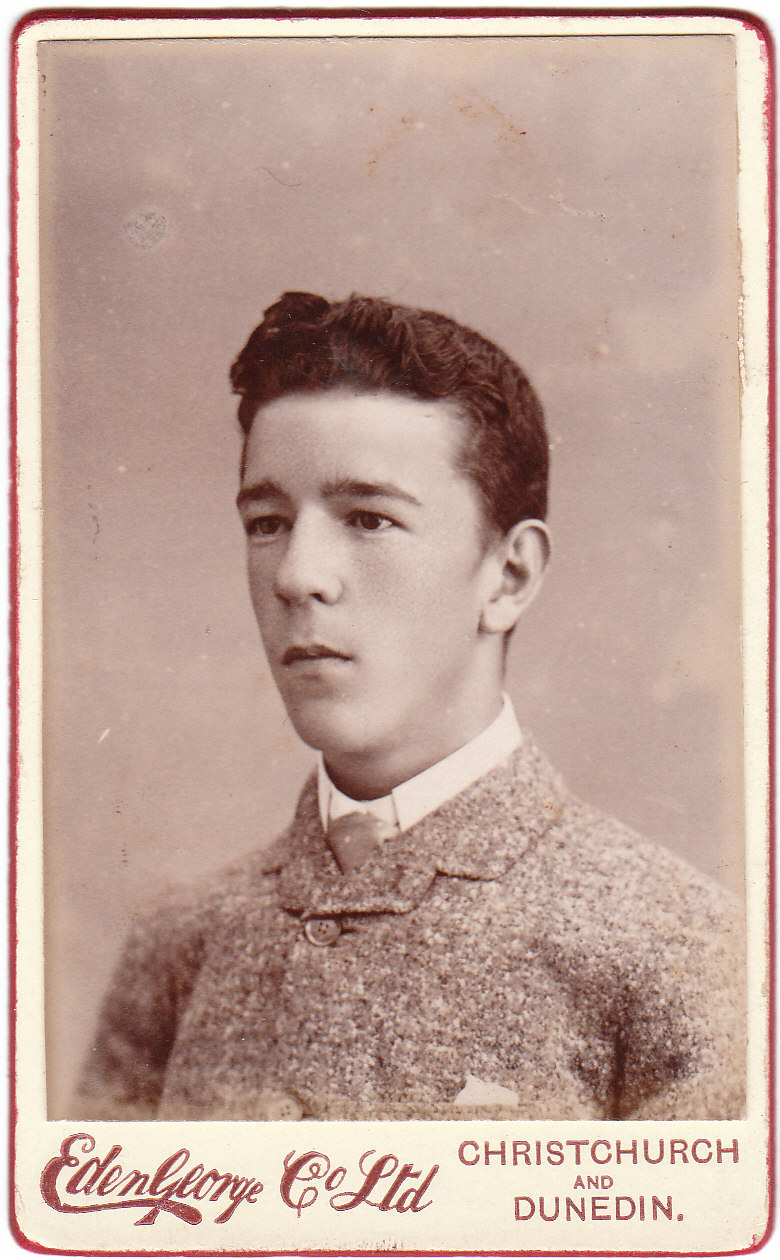
Carte de visite produced by Eden George Co Ltd

George was born in Forbes, New South Wales to photographer and well-known cyclist William Rufus George and Bettina Holme. He attended Sydney Grammar School before becoming a photographer in c.1883 in Christchurch, New Zealand. The name of his business was George and Walton and they operated at 214 Colombo Street, which was located in the central city opposite Victoria Square. The photography studio was purpose-built and they first advertised their services as 'American Photographers' in The Press on 30 November 1883, and on occasions flew the American flag at their office. A branch studio was opened in Dunedin.

He moved to Auckland and set up a branch of the Melbourne photography business Tuttle & Co in Upper Queen Street.

George returned to Christchurch; by April 1886, his name appeared in the newspaper again as a Christchurch photographer. His business partner, Walton, retired and the firm was from then known as 'Eden George'. George became embroiled in a series of legal cases between 1888 and 1890, starting with a wages dispute with Karl Gerstenkorn, whom he had met in Sydney in 1888 and hired as a plate maker for his business. Their legal battle escalated when George claimed his studio had been ransacked by an intruder; speculation attributed this either to Gerstenkorn, or rival photographers, or Eden himself seeking insurance compensation. George unwisely alleged Gerstenkorn's involvement in public and was successfully charged with slander. George sold his photography business to Wrigglesworth and Binns at the end of 1893. He went to Australia and established new businesses in Sydney and Melbourne.

== Family ==
George married Ada Jane Butler on 31 May 1885 at St Matthew's Church in Auckland. His wife was born in Christchurch in 1864; she was the daughter of Gilbert Butler (d. 1885) and Maria Page (1837–1906; died in Sydney)

Their first daughter was Morea Eden George, who was born on 17 March 1886 at their home in 27 Gloucester Street, Christchurch. The girl died just short of its first birthday on 5 March 1887 and was buried at Linwood Cemetery.

Their second daughter, Irene Eden George, was born on 11 August 1888 at their home in 27 Gloucester Street. She died in 1970 in Melbourne.

Their first son, Stanley E George, was born on 18 November 1890 at their home in Worcester Street in Christchurch. He died in 1980 in Sydney.

Their last child was Leslie George, who was born in 1893 in Christchurch. He died in an aeroplane accident on 12 May 1918 at RAF Worthy Down, England.

== Political career ==
=== New Zealand Parliament ===
George contested the Christchurch South electorate in the 1887 election. In one of his election meetings, George addressed a large crowd at the Oddfellow's Hall in Lichfield Street, where he was well received by an orderly crowd. The nomination meeting on 17 September 1887 at the same venue was often disorderly, though. Westby Perceval, Aaron Ayers, Henry Thomson and George were put forward as candidates. Thomson had been Mayor of Christchurch in 1877–1878, and Ayers was the current mayor. Of the four candidates, George came last, having received 113 votes of 1,572 votes in total (7.2%).

The resignation of Sir Julius Vogel caused the 19 June 1889 by-election in the Christchurch North electorate, contested by three candidates. Edward Humphreys beat John Ollivier by a small margin, with George coming a distant third. George received 184 out of 965 votes (19.1%).

George was one of six candidates who stood for election in three-member City of Christchurch electorate in the 1890 election; the others were William Pember Reeves, Westby Perceval, Richard Molesworth Taylor, John Tippett Smith and Edward Wingfield Humphreys. George came a distant last, receiving 119 votes out of a total of 11,715 (1.02%). Reeves, Perceval and Taylor were thus declared elected.

George contested the 1891 by-election for the City of Christchurch electorate against John Tippett Smith and Ebenezer Sandford. Sandford came first with 1851 votes, representing a majority of 742 votes. Smith and George received 1109 and 637 votes, respectively. George petitioned against the election, arguing that the nominations for Sandford and Smith were received too late by the returning officer, and he was thus the only person who could have been declared elected. The elections petitions court found that whilst the returning officer had made an error, the subsequent election was valid and the petition had to be dismissed.

Towards the end of his term as Mayor of Christchurch, the 1893 election was held. Eleven candidates, including George, stood in the City of Christchurch electorate and with 1,647 of 32,715 votes (5.0%), he came last. Together with Mortimer Davie and Joseph Evison, he represented the conservative opposition to the ruling Liberal Government.

=== Mayor of Christchurch ===
Aaron Ayers retired from two terms as Mayor of Christchurch towards the end of 1887. Charles Louisson, who had contested the most fiercely fought mayoral election in Christchurch thus far and had only been narrowly beaten by Ayers in 1886, decided to stand again. George, who had just contested the Christchurch South electorate in the September 1887 general election, was requested by 227 ratepayers to contest the mayoralty. He declined by basically stating that Louisson was the stronger candidate.

George contested the Christchurch mayoralty at the end of 1892. Three candidates were nominated: William Thomson, John Tippett Smith and George. According to Christchurch City Council records, Thomson and Smith had previously both been city councillors; Thomson served in 1890–1891 and Smith in 1891, 1893, 1896, 1899 and 1901–1903. Contemporary newspaper reporting shows that Thomson and Smith were both councillors in November 1892.

At an election meeting, George argued that the mayor's honorarium should not be seen as a salary, as previous mayors had regarded it. He claimed that it was important to elect somebody of wealth, so that he could entertain visitors and citizens beyond what the honorarium provided for.

A meeting where the three candidates all addressed electors was held the evening before election day and chaired by the current mayor, William Prudhoe. George got into an argument with the mayor over speaking arrangements, but eventually obliged with the chairman's ruling. In his speech, George was critical of the use of council funds, called for streets to be properly constructed and the Avon River to be beautified.

The election was held on 30 November 1892 at the council chambers. Unlike some other elections, polling day was an orderly affair. George received 403 votes and was elected by a narrow margin, with Thomson and Smith having received 390 and 329 votes, respectively. George was installed as mayor on 21 December of that year. He was 29 years old at the time, and was the youngest mayor up to that time in Christchurch. He advocated for improvements like asphalting the streets, which at the time he was ridiculed for, but many of these measures were carried out over the next decade.

At the end of his one-year term, George contested the mayoralty again on 29 November 1893. He was opposed by Thomas Gapes. Gapes and George received 820 and 365 votes, respectively, which represented the largest majority in a Christchurch mayoral election at that time. Gapes was installed as the new mayor at a council meeting on 20 December. He was in conflict with councillors during his mayoralty and at Gapes' installation remarked that councillors should forget him, as he would forget them. Against tradition, he did not add a link to the mayoral chain at the end of his term. He sold his photography business and left for Sydney on 30 December 1893.

The mayoralty was his only elected office for Christchurch City Council. Unlike most other mayors, he did not also serve as a city councillor at some other time.

In 1906, the following report appeared in the media:

The weight of the Christchurch Mayoral chain has now reached 3lbs. It is composed entirely of solid gold shields presented by each of the Mayors on leaving office with the exception of Mr. Eden George. The portrait of that gentleman is also missing from the collection of pictures of the Mayors hung in the Mayor's room.

=== Auckland ===
His time in Sydney was brief, and by 19 March 1894, he arrived in Auckland. He apparently tried to establish an agency for incandescent lamps. He also started canvassing for support for a by-election in the Waitemata electorate, which arose from the election of Richard Monk having been declared invalid. Jackson Palmer and William Massey were also campaigning, and William Joseph Napier received a requisition from electors. George retired from the contest, as the writ was issued too early for him being able to visit the whole electorate; only Massey and Palmer were nominated. Massey won the contest and began his parliamentary career; he was to become Prime Ministers in 1912.

=== New South Wales ===
He returned to Sydney in 1895, where he set up a photography business named 'Eden Photo Studios' at 727 George Street, opposite Central railway station. In 1898, George encountered one of several legal entanglements in which he would become involved over the remainder of his life, when he was sued for libel after advertising that a competitor's photographic development process (the "Rococo" process by Mark Blow of Crown Studios) was one of the "cheapest and easiest" in the photographic trade. After six days of hearing and an hour's deliberation, a jury returned a verdict in George's favour. In 1901, he was sued by two of his staff for not paying them wages. One of the cases was dismissed, whilst he was fined in the other case.

In 1902, George sold all his racehorses, and they did not get a single win in 90 races.

In 1901, George nominated as a candidate for New South Wales in for the Australian Senate in the inaugural federal election. He addressed a number of public meetings in Sydney's northern districts in support of his candidature, but was not elected.

From 1901 to 1907 he was a member of the New South Wales Legislative Assembly, representing Sydney-Belmore from 1901 to 1904 and Ashburnham from 1904 to 1907. Initially a Progressive, he withdrew his support from Premier Sir John See in 1902 and was endorsed by the Liberal Reform Party in 1904. Following the 1901 election, he was sued by one of his election canvassers for libel, but the complainant was nonsuited.

== World War I ==
In 1914, George travelled to Germany to attend his daughter Irene's wedding to a German doctor. He deposited the amount of £800 (for the couple's wedding present) in a German bank, then accompanied his daughter to London for a holiday. Just before the outbreak of hostilities between Britain and Germany, the German government seized all British funds deposited in German banks, ordering their value in gold to be sent to the Treasury to fund the war effort.

With the war under way, George was determined to fight on the front line. He approached British military authorities to volunteer, but they rebuffed his offer due to his age. Instead, George purchased a motor car, which he converted into an ambulance and donated to the French authorities, also volunteering to drive the vehicle. His offer was accepted, and after a month's training at Versailles, he was stationed at Compiègne. He served as an ambulance driver for several months until early 1916, when he contracted pleurisy from exposure to bad weather and was repatriated to Australia to recover.

In 1918, George and his wife were en route to England to visit their son Leslie, who was serving as a flight lieutenant in the Royal Air Force, however Leslie was killed while flying shortly after his parents' departure from Australia, and there was concern that they would not be informed of his death until their arrival.

== Later life and death ==
Following his 1907 defeat, George travelled around Europe and the United States. He died on 2 May 1927 at a private hospital in Manly.

New South Wales Legislative Assembly
Preceded by James Graham	Member for Sydney-Belmore; 1901–1904	Constituency abolished
Preceded by Joseph Reymond	Member for Ashburnham; 1904–1907	Succeeded by John Lynch
Civic offices
Preceded by William Prudhoe	Mayor of Christchurch; 1892–1893	Succeeded by Thomas Gapes
