= John Bodel =

Australian politician

John Bodel (1834 – 28 September 1903) was an Irish-born Australian politician.

He was born in Belfast and migrated to New South Wales in 1862. He was an early resident of Forbes, and married Ellen Agnes Shaw. A local alderman, he served a single term in the New South Wales Legislative Assembly as member for Forbes from 1880 to 1882. Bodel died in Forbes in 1903.

New South Wales Legislative Assembly
New seat	Member for Forbes; 1880–1882; Served alongside: Henry Cooke	Succeeded by Walter Coonan; Alfred Stokes
