= Henry Cooke (Australian politician) =

Politician and journalist in New South Wales, Australia

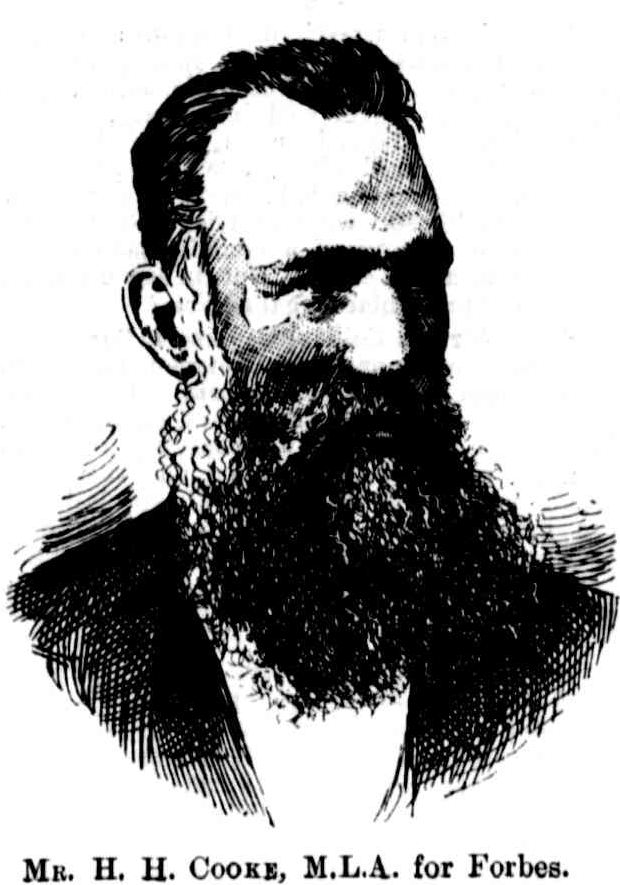

Henry Harry Cooke (1840 – 22 June 1903) was an English-born Australian politician.

He was born at St Martin's in Cornwall to wheelwright Thomas Cooke and Jane. He moved to Victoria in 1857 and New South Wales in 1861, where he worked as a miner and storekeeper. On 19 August 1869 he married Mary Ann Isabel Peacock, with whom he had nine children. Having settled in the Forbes area, he founded the Forbes and Parkes Gazette and was its initial editor. He served as a Parkes alderman and the town's first mayor. In 1880 he was elected to the New South Wales Legislative Assembly as the member for Forbes, but he was defeated in 1882. He returned in 1887 as a Free Trader, serving until his defeat in 1891.

Cooke died at Parkes in 1903 (aged 63).

New South Wales Legislative Assembly
| New district | Member for Forbes; 1880–1882; With: John Bodel | Succeeded by Walter Coonan; Alfred Stokes |
| Preceded by Walter Coonan; Alfred Stokes | Member for Forbes; 1887–1891; With: Alfred Stokes | Succeeded by Albert Gardiner; George Hutchinson |
