= Electoral district of Condoublin =

State electoral district of New South Wales, Australia

Condoublin was an electoral district of the Legislative Assembly in the Australian state of New South Wales from 1894 to 1901, in the Condobolin area.

== History ==
Prior to 1894 the town, then known as Condoublin, was part of the district of Forbes, which returned two members. Multi-member constituencies were abolished in the 1893 redistribution, resulting in the creation of 76 new districts, including Condoublin. Forbes was abolished and largely divided between the new district of Condoublin and the recreated district of The Lachlan, with the remainder going to Cobar. Condoublin also absorbed part of the abolished district of The Bogan. The electoral district included all of the counties of Cunningham and Kennedy as well as parts of the surrounding counties of Flinders, Narromine and Oxley. At its establishment in 1894 Condoublin had 1,883 enrolled voters, slightly less than the average of 2,046.

Condoublin was abolished in 1904 and absorbed by the districts of Ashburnham, Cobar and The Lachlan.

== Members for Condoublin ==
Member	Party	Term
Thomas Brown	Independent Labour	1894–1895
Thomas Brown	Labour	1895–1901
Patrick Clara	Labour	1901–1904

== Election results ==
1901 New South Wales state election: Condoublin
Party	Candidate	Votes	%	±%
Labour	Patrick Clara	575	36.1	−18.4
Independent	Andrew Stewart	560	35.1	
Independent Liberal	David Tasker	268	16.8	
Independent	William Nash	96	6.0	
Independent	William Wilkinson	95	6.0	
Total formal votes		1,594	99.3	−
Informal votes		11	0.7	−
Turnout		1,605	57.9	+3.3
Labour hold				

The election was overturned by the Elections and Qualifications Committee due to irregularities in the poll and Patrick Clara retained the seat for Labour at the subsequent by-election.
