= Thomas Brown (New South Wales politician) =

Australian farmer and politician (1861–1934)

The Honourable Thomas Brown
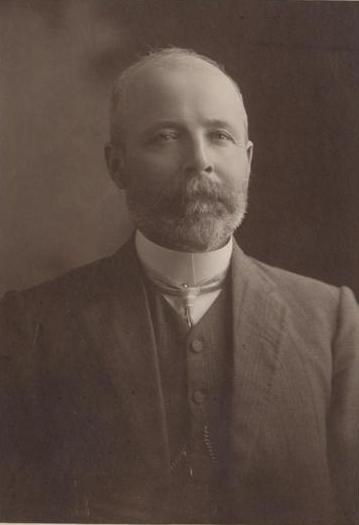

Member of the Australian Parliament for Canobolas
- In office 29 March 1901 – 12 December 1906
- Preceded by: New seat
- Succeeded by: Seat abolished

Member of the Australian Parliament for Calare
- In office 12 December 1906 – 31 May 1913
- Preceded by: New seat
- Succeeded by: Henry Pigott

Personal details
- Born: 6 October 1861 Forbes, New South Wales
- Died: 23 March 1934 (aged 72) Randwick, Sydney
- Party: Australian Labor Party
- Spouse: Louisa Jane Brown
- Children: Three
- Education: University of Sydney
- Occupation: Preacher

Thomas Brown (6 October 1861 – 23 March 1934) was an Australian farmer and politician, born near Forbes, New South Wales, to Mitchell Brown, a domestic servant, and his wife Isabella, née Abernethy.

Brown studied at St Andrew's College, University of Sydney, intending to enter the Presbyterian ministry, but was forced to withdraw due to health problems. He remained a preacher and married his cousin Louisa Jane Brown on 15 December 1897 at Chalmers Church in Redfern.

Representing Forbes at the first Farmers and Settlers' Association conference in 1893, Brown was a skilled advocate, and was elected to the New South Wales Legislative Assembly as the Labor Member for Condoublin in 1894. He was a free trader and supported Sir George Reid against Sir William Lyne and William Holman, and also attended the interstate conference for the formation of a federal Labor Party in 1900.

Brown resigned from New South Wales Parliament in 1901 and, in a surprising turn of events, defeated Bernhard Wise for the seat of Canobolas. He became known as the "Bannerman" of the parliament, and by 1906, when Canobolas had been replaced with Calare, he was usually referred to as "Honest Tom" Brown. He was easily elected to Calare, and his standing in parliament was shown when he was sent as part of the Australian delegation to the coronation of King George V in 1911. He also became the first secretary of the Empire Parliamentary Association in Australia.

Defeated in Calare in 1913, Brown returned to New South Wales politics as the member for Lachlan, where he remained well known as a supporter of rural interests. Defeated by Ernest Buttenshaw in 1917, he worked for a temperance organisation before becoming secretary to the Prime Minister, Billy Hughes.

Brown remained active in the Presbyterian community. In 1909 he was behind the public discussion on social issues which led to the famous clash between Prime Minister Andrew Fisher and Rev. John Ferguson. He was a councillor of the Scots College in Sydney and in 1915 was a member of the Council for Civil and Moral Advancement. He died of cerebral haemorrhage at his home in Randwick on 23 March 1934, survived by his wife and three children (a daughter and two sons).

New South Wales Legislative Assembly
New division	Member for Condoublin; 1894–1901	Succeeded by Patrick Clara
Parliament of Australia
New division	Member for Canobolas; 1901–1906	Division abolished
New division	Member for Calare; 1906–1913	Succeeded by Henry Pigott
New South Wales Legislative Assembly
Preceded by Andrew Kelly	Member for Lachlan; 1913–1917	Succeeded by Ernest Buttenshaw
