= Mount Canobolas =

Mountain in New South Wales, Australia

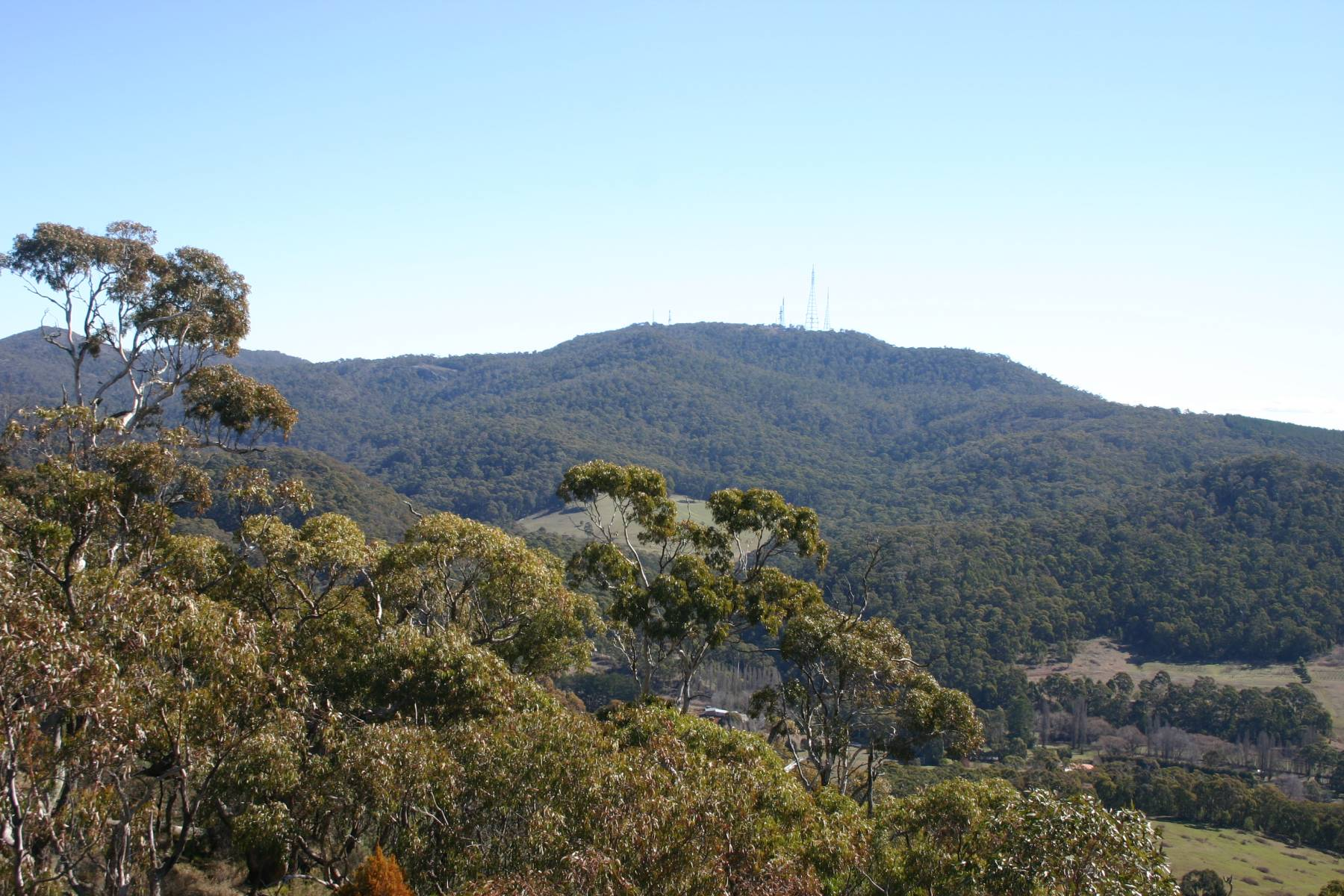
- Mount Canobolas from the Pinnacle.

Highest point
- Elevation: 1,397 m (4,583 ft)
- Coordinates: 33.344253°S 148.982309°E

Geography
- Location within New South Wales
- Location: Central Tablelands, New South Wales, Australia
- Parent range: Main Range, Great Dividing Range
- Topo map: Cudal

Geology
- Mountain type: Extinct volcano

Climbing
- First ascent: 1835 – Major Thomas Mitchell (European)
- Easiest route: Drive

Mount Canobolas, a mountain on a spur of the Great Dividing Range, is located in the Central Tablelands region of New South Wales, Australia.

With an elevation of 1,397 metres (4,583 ft) above sea level, Mount Canobolas, an extinct shield volcano, is the highest mountain in the region. Situated 13 kilometres (8.1 mi) southwest of the city of Orange, it is about 250 kilometres (155 mi) west of Sydney.

The northern slopes of the mountain, with fertile volcanic soil, is a popular cold-climate wine producing area.

== Etymology ==
The name comes from two words in the Wiradjuri language (the local Aboriginal language), "gaahna" and "bula". This means "two shoulders" which refers to the summits of Mount Canobolas itself and the subsidiary peak Young Man Canobolas.

== Description ==
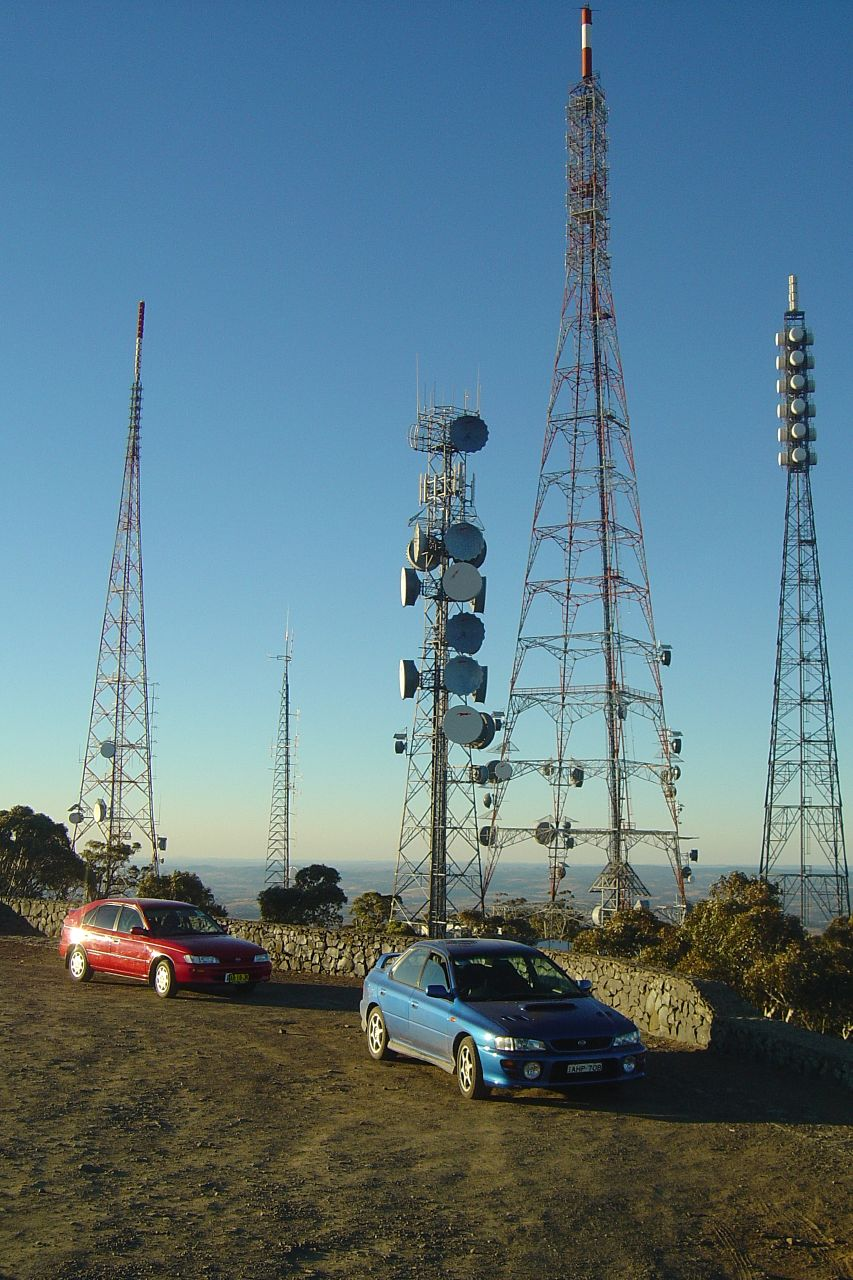
Communications towers atop Mount Canobolas

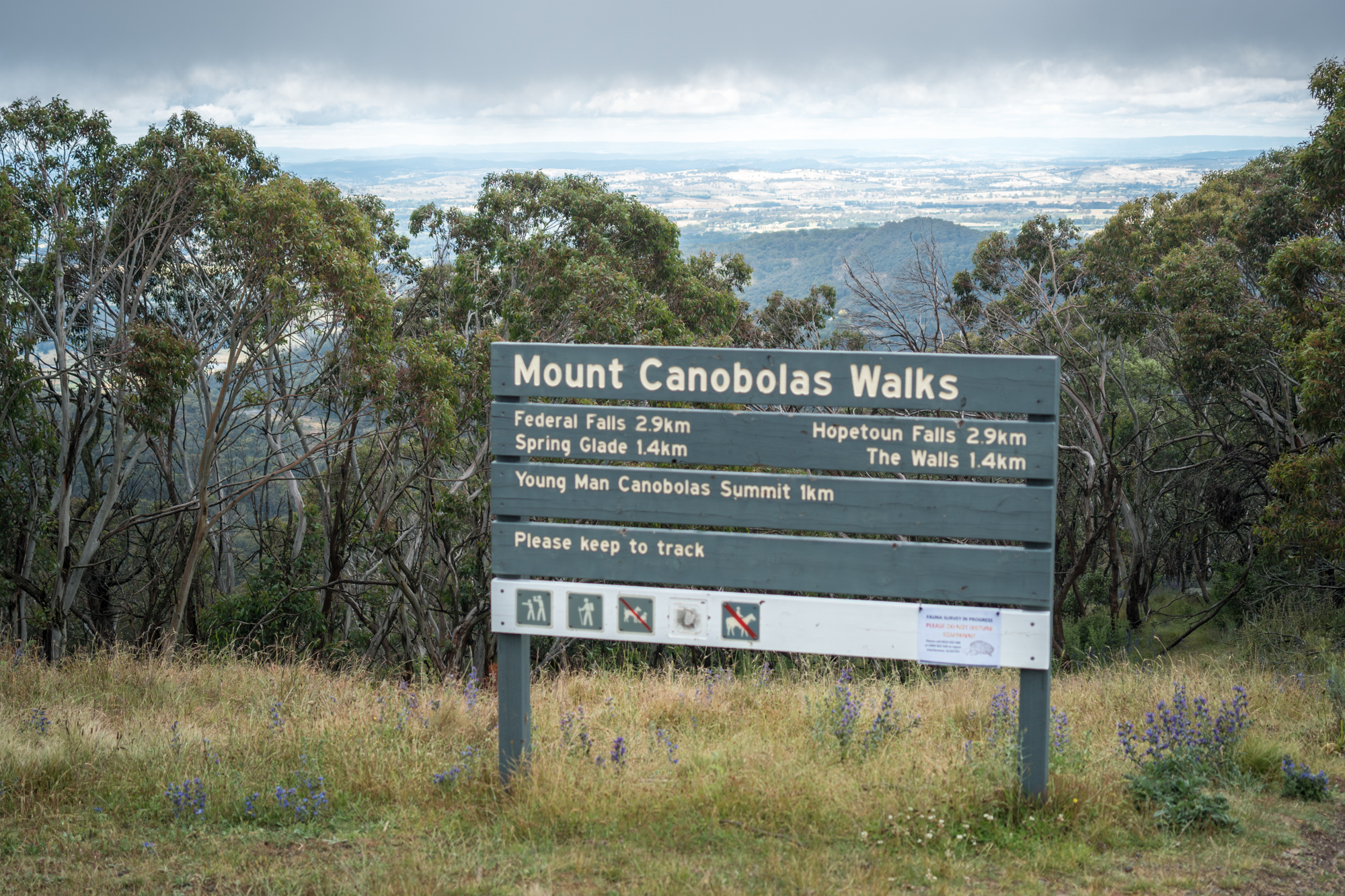
Mount Canobolas Walks sign

Mount Canobolas is an extinct volcanic complex which erupted in several phases between 13 and 11 million years ago, making the mountain a relatively recent geological feature. Earlier eruptions were less violent with free flowing lavas reaching a maximum coverage extent of approximately. Later eruptions became more violent, and producing increasingly viscous lavas with less extensive coverage.

The contemporary landscape of Mount Canobolas exhibits erosional features dominated by several remnant peaks. Additional volcanic features are present within the zone of volcanic influence, including vents, dykes, peaks, domes and plugs.

The mountain's geologic history has yielded a variety of landforms which provide a range of environmental habitats, and notably rocky outcrops harbouring rare species of lichens. There are cliff features with waterfalls, such as the popular recreation locality, Federal Falls. Mount Canobolas was listed on the Register of the National Estate because of its geological significance, before the Register was abandoned in 2007.

There is a 360 degree view from the summit, which is often snow-capped in winter. The summit can be seen from up to 100 km away.

The mountain is now part of the 15-square-kilometre (5.8 sq mi) Mount Canobolas Conservation Area, managed by the NSW National Parks and Wildlife Service, which offers various walks: to Bald Hill; to Young Man Canobolas; Federal Falls to Mount Towac, and other locations. The volcanic peaks give wide views and there are some attractive waterfalls.

Since 1962, with the opening of television stations ABCN-1 and CBN-8, the top of the mountain has been dominated by several towers used for communications, radio and television transmissions across large areas of the Central Tablelands and Central Western Slopes regions. These include towers for television transmitters – Australian Broadcasting Corporation, Seven Network (formerly Prime7 and Prime Television), Channel 10 (formerly Southern Cross Nine and Southern Cross 10), and WIN Television – and for Airservices Australia and the Royal Australian Air Force.

Each year the Orange community runs the Great Volcanic Mountain Challenge, an 11-kilometre (6.8 mi) walk and fun run from the Pinnacle to the Summit of Mount Canobolas by the volcanic plugs of Mount Towac and Young Man Canobolas. The inaugural event was held in 2006.

== Fires on the mountain ==
A major bushfire in 1967 affected 415 ha in the northern section of the Mount Canobolas Conservation Area. Another bushfire in 1982 affected 414 ha in the western part of the conservation area and a further bushfire occurred in the southern part of the conservation area in 1985.

Another bushfire affected most of the northern area of Mount Canobolas in February 2018, and the entire Mount Canobolas Conservation Area apart from the summit remains closed (as of mid 2020) until the effects of this fire – the danger of falling trees and branches and damage to much of the walking track infrastructure – are rectified.

Bushire frequency on Mount Canobolas is poorly recorded, however it is believed to be quite low. The floristic composition suggests that the vegetation has evolved largely in the absence of regular intense fire. Information from local landholders indicates that the mountain was subjected to annual low intensity burning by previous occupiers to maintain fresh feed for their stock during the 1940s and 1950s.

== Highest point claims ==
Mount Canobolas is not, as is sometimes claimed in tourism brochures, the highest point between Australia's Great Dividing Range and Africa, as Mount Zeil in Australia's Northern Territory and Ngarutjaranya in South Australia are further west and higher, and a number of peaks elsewhere on the Great Dividing Range and peaks on Madagascar and Réunion are higher. It is, however, the highest point in a direct east-west line between the Blue Mountains and the western coast of Australia. However, it is also higher than anywhere in the Blue Mountains, and it is the highest point in the Central Tablelands of New South Wales.

== See also ==
- List of mountains in Australia § New South Wales
- List of volcanoes in Australia
- Division of Canobolas
