= Patrick Clara =

Australian politician

Patrick James Clara (1863 – 20 October 1915) was an Australian politician.

He was born in Forbes, the son of Michael Clara. He was a storekeeper, but was bankrupted in 1887 and became a commercial traveller. A member of the Forbes and Waverley Leagues, he was elected to the New South Wales Legislative Assembly in 1901, winning the seat of Condoublin for the Labor Party. His initial victory was overturned due to voting irregularities, but he won the by-election later that year. He was defeated in 1904 running for Ashburnham. After his political career, he worked as a ganger and a toolsmith. He died in Sydney on 1915.

New South Wales Legislative Assembly
| Preceded by Thomas Brown | Member for Condoublin; 1901–1904 | Abolished |
