= William Gocher =

- Born: 20 March 1856; Ipswich, Suffolk
- Died: 18 August 1921 (aged 65); New South Wales
- Spouse: Elizabeth Josephine Storm
- Children: 6

William Henry Gocher (20 March 1856 – 18 August 1921) was an Australian artist and advocate for bimetallism who campaigned to lift the ban on daylight sea bathing in Sydney.

Gocher was born in Ipswich, Suffolk to salesman Charles Gocher and Louisa King. He attended St John's College at Hurstpierpoint, converted to Roman Catholicism and emigrated to Australia around 1872. He worked as an artist in Sydney from around 1884. On 2 May 1888, he married Elizabeth Josephine Storm in Surry Hills. In the 1890s, he was an active member of the bimetallic movement, serving as vice-president of the Bimetallic League of New South Wales. Gocher admired William Jennings Bryan and supported Federation, believing it would shield Australia from the "jeers of Jews, capitalists and the press". He unsuccessfully contested the Senate in 1901 and the New South Wales Parliament in 1901 and 1904. Gocher continued advocating for bimetallism as president of the Australian Currency League from 1912 to 1918. In 1918, he published a pamphlet, Australia Must be Heard, urging the Pope to bring about an armistice.

A writer for John Norton's Truth, he established the Manly and Sydney News in 1900 when he and his family moved to Manly. As part of a campaign against the ban on daylight bathing, he announced his intention to swim at midday in October 1902; the police took him away after he criticised their laxness, and he was not charged with any crimes. In November 1903, Manly Council legalised all-day bathing; many attributed Gocher with the victory. He returned to the city in 1906 and launched the Balmain Banner. Having been devastated by one of his sons' death at Messines, he suffered a stroke in 1917 and died in 1921 of arteriosclerosis and chronic nephritis.
