= Electoral district of Ashburnham =

Former state electoral district of New South Wales, Australia

Ashburnham was an electoral district of the Legislative Assembly in the Australian state of New South Wales, originally created in 1894 in the Parkes area and named after Ashburnham County. In 1920, with the introduction of proportional representation, it was absorbed into Murrumbidgee, along with Lachlan. It was recreated in 1927 and abolished in 1950.

== Members for Ashburnham ==
First incarnation (1894–1920)
Member	Party	Term
Albert Gardiner	Independent Labour	1894–1895
Joseph Reymond	Protectionist	1895–1901
Joseph Reymond	Progressive	1901–1904
Eden George	Liberal Reform	1904–1907
John Lynch	Labor	1907–1913
Arthur Grimm	Farmers and Settlers	1913–1917
Arthur Grimm	Nationalist	1917–1920
Second incarnation (1927–1950)
Member	Party	Term
Edmund Best	Nationalist	1927–1930
William Keast	Labor	1930–1932
Hilton Elliott	Country	1932–1941
Edgar Dring	Labor	1941–1950

== See also ==
- Electoral results for the district of Ashburnham
