= Albert Gardiner =

Australian politician (1867–1952)

The Honourable Albert Gardiner
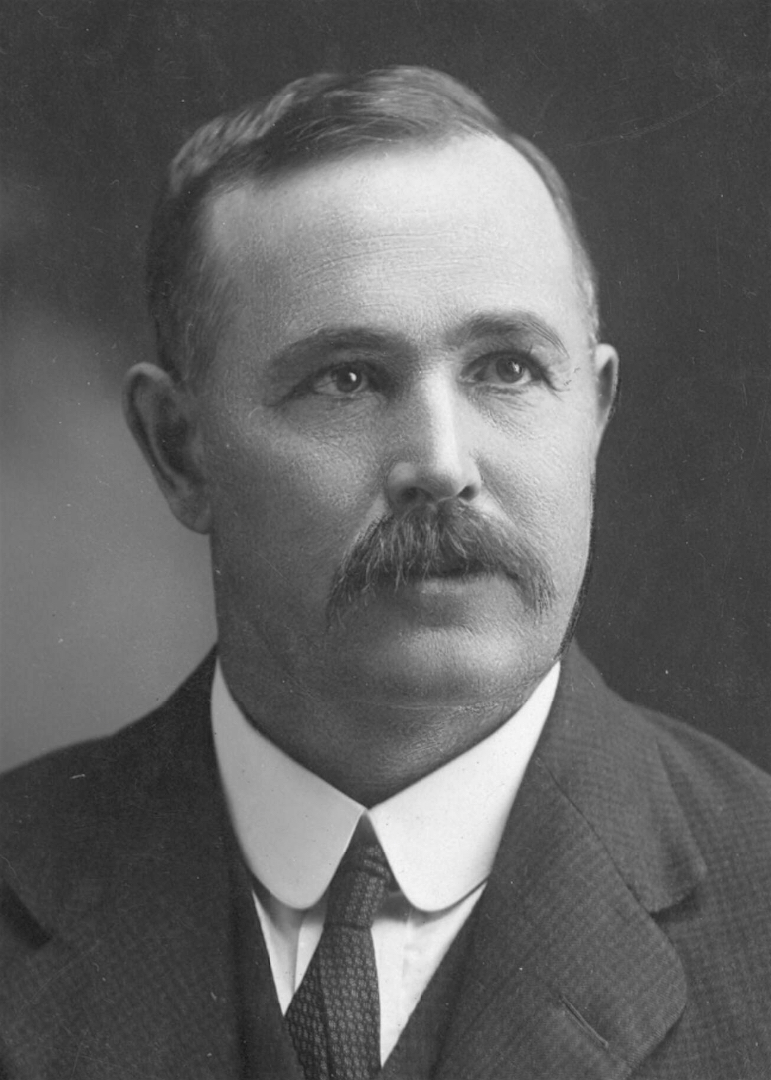

Deputy Leader of the Australian Labor Party
- In office 14 November 1916 – 30 June 1926
- Leader: Frank Tudor; Matthew Charlton
- Preceded by: George Pearce
- Succeeded by: James Scullin

Leader of the Opposition in the Senate
- In office 17 February 1917 – 30 June 1926
- Preceded by: Edward Millen
- Succeeded by: Ted Needham

Senator for New South Wales
- In office 1 July 1910 – 30 June 1926
- Preceded by: John Neild
- Succeeded by: Walter Massy-Greene
- In office 5 June 1928 – 16 November 1928
- Preceded by: John Grant
- Succeeded by: John Dooley

Personal details
- Born: 30 July 1867 Orange, New South Wales, Australia
- Died: 14 August 1952 (aged 85) Bondi Junction, New South Wales, Australia
- Party: Labor
- Spouses: Ada Jewell (m. 1892–1897) Theresa Clayton (m. 1902)
- Occupation: Goldminer

Albert "Jupp" Gardiner (30 July 1867 – 14 August 1952) was an Australian politician who served as a Senator for New South Wales from 1910 to 1926 and again briefly in 1928. A member of the Labor Party, he served in cabinet as Vice-President of the Executive Council under Andrew Fisher and Billy Hughes, and from 1916 to 1926 was his party's Senate leader; he was its only senator from 1920 to 1922. Before entering federal politics he had served in the Parliament of New South Wales from 1891 to 1895 and from 1904 to 1907.

== Early life ==
Gardiner was born on 30 July 1867 in Orange, New South Wales. He was the seventh son and one of twelve children born to Charlotte (née Davis) and William Gardiner. His father, born in Tasmania, was a wheelwright. His mother was illiterate at the time of his birth.

Gardiner was educated at Flanagan's School in Orange until the age of 15, when he was apprenticed to a carpenter. He moved to Parkes in 1890 and began working at the Hazlehurst gold battery. He was nicknamed "Jupp" after the English cricketer Harry Jupp, whom he was supposed to resemble; both were large men with broad shoulders.

Gardiner played rugby union as a forward and represented New South Wales against New Zealand and Queensland in 1897 and against England in 1899.

== New South Wales politics ==
In 1891, Gardiner was elected to the New South Wales Legislative Assembly with the support of the Labor Electoral League, the Labor Party's predecessor. He topped the poll in the seat of Forbes, although he refused to sign Labor's solidarity pledge in 1893. In 1894, with the abolition of Forbes, he was elected the member for Ashburnham, but was defeated in 1895. He stood unsuccessfully for Ashburnham in 1898 for the Free Trade Party and Orange in 1901 as an independent. He was elected member for Orange in 1904, but lost the seat in 1907.

== Federal politics ==
=== Early years ===
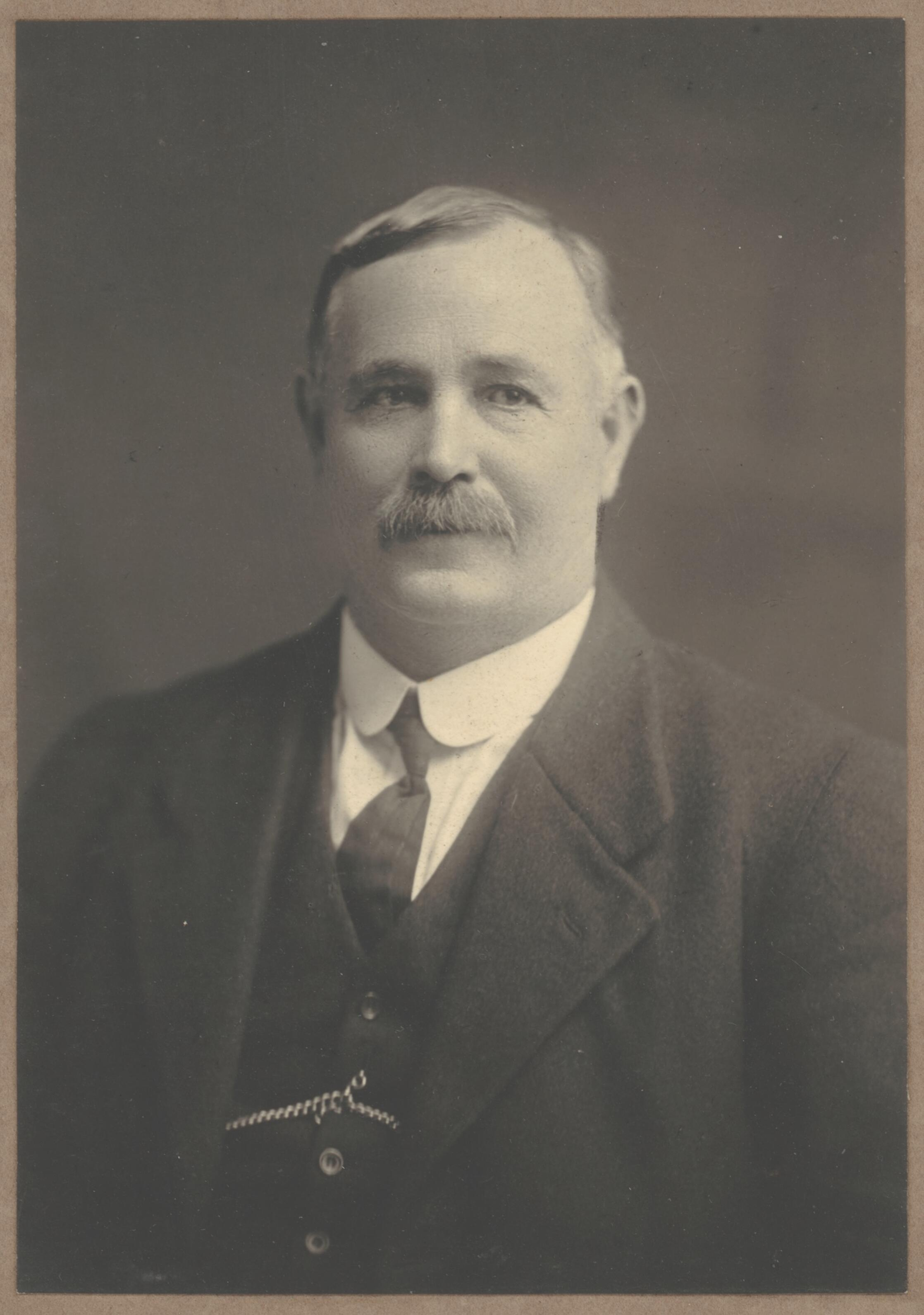
Undated photo, T. Humphrey & Co.

Gardiner was elected to the Senate at the 1910 federal election, winning a six-year term commencing on 1 July 1910. He was one of the parliamentary representatives of Australia at the coronation of King George V in 1911. In the Senate, Gardiner spoke on a wide range of topics and was known for his "forceful delivery, 'rapid in utterance, fiery in tone'", as well as for his independence of mind including deviation from decisions of the ALP caucus on some occasions. He was a prominent opponent of the Cook government from 1913 to 1914, which had secured a narrow one-seat majority in the House of Representatives but faced a hostile Senate dominated by the ALP.

=== Ministerial career ===
Following a double dissolution, Gardiner was re-elected to the Senate at the 1914 election and was subsequently appointed Vice-President of the Executive Council in the Fisher government. He was also made assistant minister for defence in July 1915, under defence minister and Senate leader George Pearce, retaining both roles after Billy Hughes replaced Andrew Fisher as prime minister in October 1915. As assistant defence minister he "took a close interest in the conditions of military camps".

Gardiner supported Australian involvement in World War I but was unequivocally opposed to compulsory overseas service for conscripts. He nonetheless supported the government's decision to hold the 1916 Australian conscription referendum, in the interests of cabinet solidarity. On 27 October 1916, a day before the referendum, Gardiner discovered that Hughes had authorised the distribution of a compulsory questionnaire aimed at detecting conscription evaders, despite the fact that he and fellow ministers William Higgs and Edward Russell had expressly withheld consent for such a measure. They resigned from the ministry on the same date, not before Gardiner had released an account of the incident to the press.

=== Senate leader ===
In November 1916, the ALP formally split over conscription and expelled Hughes from the party, who remained as prime minister at the head of a National Labor Party ministry and later merged with the opposition Liberal Party to form a Nationalist government. Gardiner remained loyal to the ALP, now led by Frank Tudor, and on 29 November 1916 replaced Pearce as the party's Senate leader and leader of the opposition in the Senate.

The 1917 federal election saw a landslide victory for the Nationalists, with the ALP failing to win any Senate seats and being left without a Senate majority for the first time since 1910. Gardiner played a key role in the diminished ALP opposition's attempts to thwart Hughes' agenda. In November 1918, he mounted a filibuster against the Commonwealth Electoral Act 1918, which introduced preferential voting for House of Representatives. He spoke on the bill for 12 hours and 40 minutes, reading the entire bill and its schedule, and setting a record for the longest parliamentary speech in Australia. The Senate subsequently amended its standing orders to introduce a time limit for speeches.

Gardiner was the only ALP senator re-elected at the 1919 election, with the consecutive electoral wipeouts leaving him as the party's sole Senate representative from 1920 to 1923. In 1922, he contested the leadership of the Labor Party against Matthew Charlton who defeated him by 22 votes to 2. In 1924, Gardiner was the only member of parliament to make "sustained objections" to the introduction of compulsory voting for federal elections, despite its inclusion in the ALP platform. He stated his opposition to "anything in democracy which savours of compulsion" and described the bill as "a further infringement on the liberty of the individual".

=== Final years ===
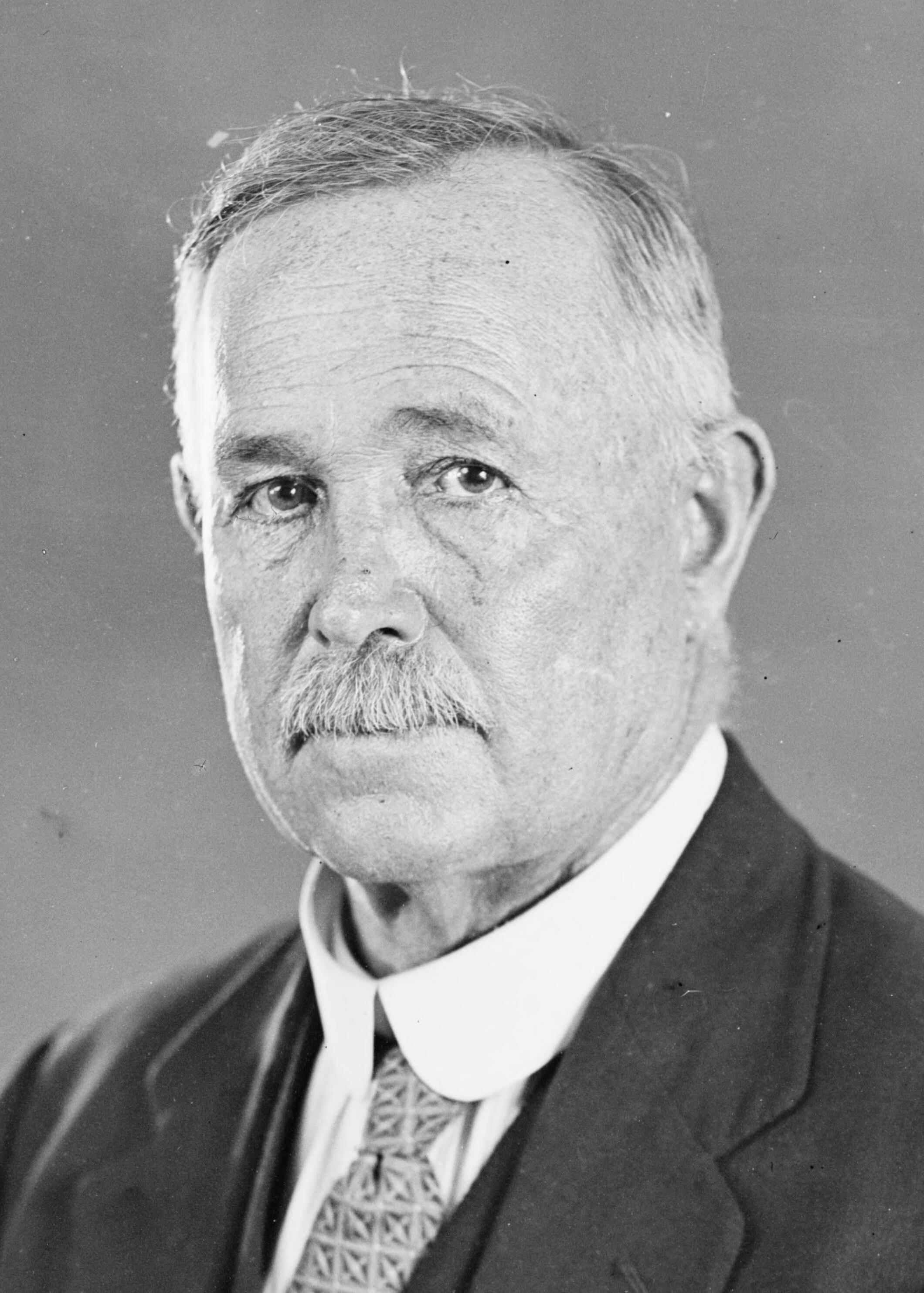
Gardiner in later life

Gardiner lost his Senate seat at the 1925 election, with his term as a senator and ALP Senate leader expiring on 30 June 1926.

In 1928, Gardiner filled a casual vacancy for five months, despite expulsion from the Lang-led state branch of the party. He unsuccessfully contested Dalley as an independent Labor candidate in 1928. He then unsuccessfully contested the State seats of Waverley in 1932 and Canterbury in 1935 as an Official Labor candidate—that is, recognised by the Federal Labor Party, but not the State branch.

== Personal life ==
Gardiner was married to Ada Evelyn Jewell from 1892 until their divorce in 1897. She was also active in the labour movement and in 1906 was one of the first women elected to the ALP state executive in New South Wales, along with Kate Dwyer, Harriet Powell, Selina Siggins, Mary Anne Grant, Edith Bethel and Maggie Hall.

In 1902, Gardiner re-married to Theresa Alice Clayton, with whom he had two children. He died on 14 August 1952 at his home in Bondi Junction, Sydney, aged 85.

Political offices
Preceded by James McColl	Vice-President of the Executive Council; 1914–1916	Succeeded by William Spence
Party political offices
Preceded by George Pearce	Deputy Leader of the Australian Labor Party; 1916–1926	Succeeded by James Scullin
Preceded by George Pearce	Leader of the Australian Labor Party in the Senate; 1916–1926	Succeeded by Ted Needham
New South Wales Legislative Assembly
Preceded by Henry Cooke	Member for Forbes; 1891 – 1894; Served alongside: Hutchinson	Succeeded by Abolished
Preceded by New seat	Member for Ashburnham; 1894 – 1895	Succeeded by Joseph Reymond
Preceded by Harry Newman	Member for Orange; 1904 – 1907	Succeeded by John Fitzpatrick
