= Joseph Reymond =

Australian politician (1843–1918)

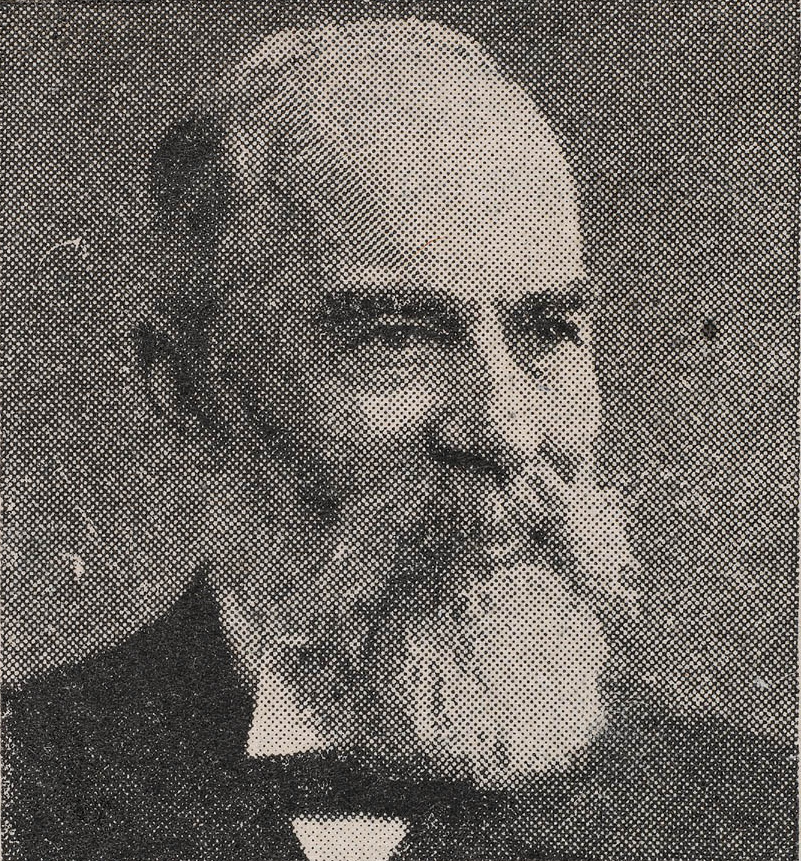
Joseph Bernard Reymond, MLA for Ashburnham

Joseph Bernard Reymond (3 May 1843 – 20 September 1918) was a French-born Australian politician.

He was born in Chabaud in France to farmer Etienne Bernard Reymond and Elizabeth Charriere Rond. He taught English from 1854 until 1857 before migrating to Melbourne in 1857, prospecting at Ararat, Ballarat and Chiltern. In 1862 he followed a gold rush to Forbes, where he set up a general store. He was an alderman from 1875 to 1884 and mayor from 1883 to 1884. He had married Margaret Kerr on 13 August 1861 at Wahgunyah; they had seven children. In 1895, Reymond was elected to the New South Wales Legislative Assembly as the Protectionist member for Ashburnham. He served until 1904, when he was defeated running as an independent. Reymond became director of Forbes Hospital in his retirement, and died at Forbes in 1918.

New South Wales Legislative Assembly
Preceded by Albert Gardiner	Member for Ashburnham; 1895–1904	Succeeded by Eden George
