= Members of the New South Wales Legislative Council, 1882–1885 =

Members of the New South Wales Legislative Council who served from 1882 to 1885 were appointed for life by the Governor on the advice of the Premier. This list includes members between the elections commencing on 30 November 1882 and the elections commencing on 16 October 1885. (Note: Sir Alexander Stuart and James Farnell were appointed on 7 October 1885, but did not take their seats until November 1885.) The President was Sir John Hay.

| Name | Years in office | Office |
|---|---|---|
| Robert Abbott (Note: Robert Abbott and Alexander Gordon were appointed on 18 September 1883, and took their seats on the same day.) | 1883–1888 | |
| William Alderson (Note: William Alderson died on 21 April 1884.) | 1881–1882, 1882–1884 | |
| Archibald Bell (Note: Archibald Bell died on 9 August 1883.) | 1879–1883 | |
| John Blaxland (Note: John Blaxland died on 26 January 1884.) | 1863–1884 | |
| William Brodribb | 1882–1886 | |
| William Busby | 1867–1887 | |
| William Byrnes | 1858–1861, 1861–1891 | |
| Thomas Cadell | 1881–1886 | |
| Alexander Campbell | 1864–1890 | Postmaster-General (30 August 1882 − 4 January 1883) |
| Charles Campbell | 1870–1888 | |
| John Campbell | 1856, 1861–1886 | |
| Samuel Charles | 1885–1909 | |
| James Chisholm | 1865–1888 | |
| Edward Cox (Note: Edward Cox died on 25 June 1883.) | 1874–1883 | |
| George Cox | 1863–1901 | |
| John Creed (Note: 8 members were appointed on 31 August 1885, and took their seats on 8 September 1885.) | 1885–1930 | |
| William Dalley (Note: William Dalley was appointed on 5 January 1883.) | 1870–1873, 1875–1880, 1883–1888 | Attorney General; Representative of the Government (5 January 1883 − 6 October 1885) |
| Henry Dangar (Note: Henry Dangar & Archibald Jacob were appointed on 18 September 1883, and took their seats on 9 October 1883.) | 1883–1917 | |
| Frederick Darley | 1868–1886 | Representative of the Government; Vice-President of the Executive Council (14 November 1881 − 4 January 1883) |
| Leopold De Salis | 1874–1898 | |
| Joseph Docker (Note: Joseph Docker died on 11 December 1884.) | 1856–1861, 1863–1884 | Chairman of Committees (16 December 1880 − 11 December 1884) |
| Alexander Dodds | 1885–1892 | |
| John Eales | 1880–1894 | |
| Edward Flood | 1879–1888 | |
| John Frazer (Note: John Frazer died on 25 October 1884.) | 1874–1884 | |
| Alexander Gordon | 1883–1886 | |
| William Grahame | 1875–1889 | |
| William Halliday | 1885–1892 | |
| Sir John Hay | 1867–1892 | President |
| Richard Hill | 1880–1895 | |
| Thomas Holt (Note: Thomas Holt resigned on 6 December 1883 to return to England.) | 1868–1883 | |
| Archibald Jacob | 1883–1900 | |
| Samuel Joseph (Note: Samuel Joseph resigned on 8 September 1885.) | 1882–1885, 1887–1893 | |
| Philip King | 1880–1904 | |
| Edward Knox | 1856–1857, 1882–1894 | |
| John Lackey | 1885–1903 | |
| George Lee | 1882–1912 | |
| Lewis Levy (Note: Lewis Levy died on 25 January 1885.) | 1880–1885 | |
| William Long | 1885–1909 | |
| Francis Lord | 1856–1861, 1864–1893 | |
| John Lucas | 1880–1902 | |
| John Macintosh | 1882–1911 | |
| Charles Mackellar | 1885–1903, 1903–1925 | |
| William Macleay | 1877–1891 | |
| John Marks (Note: John Marks died on 3 March 1885.) | 1878–1885 | |
| Charles Moore | 1880–1895 | |
| Henry Moore | 1868–1888 | |
| Henry Mort | 1882–1900 | |
| Henry Moses | 1885–1923 | |
| James Neale (Note: James Neale was appointed on 18 September 1883, and took their seats on 17 October 1883.) | 1883–1890 | |
| James Norton | 1879–1906 | Postmaster-General (2 May 1884 − 6 October 1885) |
| Edward Ogilvie | 1863–1889 | |
| William Piddington | 1879–1887 | Chairman of Committees (17 March 1885 − 25 November 1887) |
| John Richardson | 1868–1887 | |
| Richard Roberts | 1882–1903 | |
| Jeremiah Rundle | 1882–1893 | |
| John Ryan (Note: John Ryan was appointed on 18 September 1883, and took his seat on 31 October 1883.) | 1883–1887 | |
| John Smith (b 1811) | 1880–1895 | |
| John Smith (b 1821) (Note: John Smith (b 1821) died on 12 October 1885.) | 1874–1885 | |
| Sir Alfred Stephen | 1856–1858, 1875–1879, 1879–1885, 1886–1890 | |
| John Stewart | 1879–1895 | |
| John Suttor | 1882–1886 | |
| William Suttor Jr. | 1880–1900 | |
| Samuel Terry | 1882–1887 | |
| George Thornton | 1877–1901 | |
| John Watt | 1861–1866, 1874–1890 | |
| Edmund Webb | 1882–1899 | |
| James White | 1874–1890 | |

== See also ==
- Third Parkes ministry
- Stuart ministry
- First Dibbs ministry
