= Members of the New South Wales Legislative Council, 1880–1882 =

Members of the New South Wales Legislative Council who served from 1880 to 1882 were appointed for life by the Governor on the advice of the Premier. This list includes members between the elections commencing on 17 November 1880 and the elections commencing on 30 November 1882. The President was Sir John Hay.

Name	Years in office	Office
William Alderson (Note: William Alderson was appointed on 29 December 1881, discovered he may have had an interest in a contract with the Crown, resigning on 19 August 1882 before taking his seat, was re-appointed on 21 August 1882, and took his seat on 22 August 1882.)	1881–1882, 1882–1884	
Archibald Bell	1879–1883	
John Blaxland	1863–1884	
William Brodribb (Note: 11 members were appointed on 29 December 1881, and took their seats on 22 August 1882.)	1882–1886	
Stephen Brown (Note: Stephen Brown was appointed on 16 November 1881.) (Note: Stephen Brown died on 16 October 1882.)	1881–1882	Postmaster-General (14 November 1881 − 22 August 1882)
William Busby	1867–1887	
William Byrnes	1858–1861, 1861–1891	
Thomas Cadell	1881–1886	
Alexander Campbell	1864–1890	Postmaster-General (30 August 1882 − 4 January 1883)
Charles Campbell	1870–1888	
John Campbell	1856, 1861–1886	
James Chisholm	1865–1888	
Edward Cox	1874–1883	
George Cox	1863–1901	
Frederick Darley	1868–1886	Representative of the Government; Vice-President of the Executive Council
Leopold De Salis	1874–1898	
Joseph Docker	1856–1861, 1863–1884	Chairman of Committees
John Eales (Note: 10 members were appointed on 10 December 1880, and took their seats on 15 December 1880.)	1880–1894	
Edward Flood	1879–1888	
John Frazer	1874–1884	
Samuel Gordon (Note: Samuel Gordon died on 24 July 1882.)	1861–1882	
William Grahame	1875–1889	
Sir John Hay	1867–1892	President
Patrick Higgins (Note: Patrick Higgins died on 28 January 1882.)	1880–1882	
Richard Hill	1880–1895	
Thomas Holt	1868–1883	
Sir Joseph Innes (Note: Sir Joseph Innes resigned on 14 October 1881 on being appointed a Judge of the Supreme Court of New South Wales.)	1873–1881	
Samuel Joseph	1882–1885, 1887–1893	
Philip King	1880–1904	
Edward Knox	1856–1857, 1882–1894	
George Lee	1882–1912	
Lewis Levy	1880–1885	
Francis Lord	1856–1861, 1864–1893	
John Lucas	1880–1902	
Sir William Macarthur (Note: The seat of Sir William Macarthur was declared vacant due to absence on 22 August 1882.)	1864–1882	
John Macintosh	1882–1911	
William Macleay	1877–1891	
John Marks	1878–1885	
Charles Moore	1880–1895	
Henry Moore	1868–1888	
Henry Mort	1882–1900	
James Norton	1879–1906	
George Oakes (Note: George Oakes died on 10 August 1881.)	1879–1881	
Edward Ogilvie	1863–1889	
Arthur Onslow (Note: Arthur Onslow died on 31 January 1882.)	1880–1882	
William Piddington	1879–1887	
John Richardson	1868–1887	
Richard Roberts	1882–1903	
Sir John Robertson (Note: Sir John Robertson resigned on 31 December 1881 to return to the Legislative Assembly.)	1861, 1861, 1879–1881	
Jeremiah Rundle (Note: Jeremiah Rundle was appointed on 29 December 1881, and took his seat on 13 September 1882.)	1882–1893	
Thomas Smart (Note: Thomas Smart died on 28 May 1881.)	1870–1881	
John Smith (b 1811)	1880–1895	
John Smith (b 1821)	1874–1885	
Sir Alfred Stephen	1856–1858, 1875–1879, 1879–1885, 1886–1890	
John Stewart	1879–1895	
John Sutherland (Note: John Sutherland was appointed on 29 December 1881, and resigned on 29 November 1882 without taking his seat to contest the 1882 Redfern election.)	1881–1882	
John Suttor	1882–1886	
William Suttor Jr.	1880–1900	
Samuel Terry	1882–1887	
George Thornton	1877–1901	
John Watt	1861–1866, 1874–1890	
Edmund Webb	1882–1899	
Elias Weekes (Note: Elias Weekes died on 24 November 1880.)	1865–1880	
James White	1874–1890	

== See also ==
- Third Parkes ministry
