= Members of the New South Wales Legislative Council, 1885–1887 =

Members of the New South Wales Legislative Council who served from 1885 to 1887 were appointed for life by the Governor on the advice of the Premier. This list includes members between the elections commencing on 16 October 1885 and the elections commencing on 4 February 1887. The President was Sir John Hay.

Name	Years in office	Office
Robert Abbott	1883–1888	
William Brodribb (Note: William Brodribb died on 31 May 1886.)	1882–1886	
John Burns (Note: John Burns was appointed on 21 January 1887, for the purpose of taking charge of the supply bill and resigned on 28 January 1887 to return to the Legislative Assembly.)	1887	Representative of the Government (21 – 27 January 1887)
William Busby	1867–1887	
William Byrnes	1858–1861, 1861–1891	
Thomas Cadell (Note: Thomas Cadell resigned on 22 September 1886 to visit England.)	1881–1886	
Alexander Campbell	1864–1890	
Charles Campbell	1870–1888	
John Campbell (Note: John Campbell died on 2 January 1886.)	1856, 1861–1886	
Samuel Charles	1885–1909	
James Chisholm	1865–1888	
George Cox	1863–1901	
John Creed	1885–1930	
William Dalley	1870–1873, 1875–1880, 1883–1888	
Henry Dangar	1883–1917	
Frederick Darley (Note: Frederick Darley resigned on 1 December 1886 as he had been appointed Chief Justice.)	1868–1886	
Leopold De Salis	1874–1898	
Alexander Dodds	1885–1892	
John Eales	1880–1894	
James Farnell (Note: James Farnell was appointed on 7 October 1885, and took his seat on 25 November 1885.)	1885–1887	
Edward Flood	1879–1888	
Alexander Gordon (Note: Alexander Gordon had retired to England in 1885 and resigned on 18 August 1886.)	1883–1886	
William Grahame	1875–1889	
William Halliday	1885–1892	
Sir John Hay	1867–1892	President
Richard Hill	1880–1895	
Archibald Jacob	1883–1900	
Philip King	1880–1904	
Edward Knox	1856–1857, 1882–1894	
John Lackey	1885–1903	
George Lee	1882–1912	
William Long	1885–1909	
Francis Lord	1856–1861, 1864–1893	
John Lucas	1880–1902	
John Macintosh	1882–1911	
Charles Mackellar	1885–1903, 1903–1925	Representative of the Government; Vice-President of the Executive Council (26 February 1886 – 23 December 1886)
William Macleay	1877–1891	
Charles Moore	1880–1895	
Henry Moore	1868–1888	
Henry Mort	1882–1900	
Henry Moses	1885–1923	
James Neale	1883–1890	
James Norton	1879–1906	
Edward Ogilvie	1863–1889	
William Piddington	1879–1887	Chairman of Committees
John Richardson	1868–1887	
Richard Roberts	1882–1903	
Jeremiah Rundle	1882–1893	
John Ryan (Note: John Ryan died on 28 January 1887.)	1883–1887	
George Simpson (Note: George Simpson was appointed on 22 December 1885.)	1885–1894	Representative of the Government (22 December 1885 – 25 February 1886)
John Smith	1880–1895	
Sir Alfred Stephen (Note: Sir Alfred Stephen resigned on 9 November 1885 to become acting Governor of New South Wales and was re-appointed on 16 December 1885, taking his seat on 27 January 1886.)	1856–1858, 1875–1879, 1879–1885, 1886–1890	
John Stewart	1879–1895	
Sir Alexander Stuart (Note: Sir Alexander Stuart was appointed on 7 October 1885, took his seat on 17 November 1885 and died on 16 June 1886.)	1885–1886	
John Suttor (Note: John Suttor died on 27 May 1886.)	1882–1886	
William Suttor Jr.	1880–1900	
Samuel Terry	1882–1887	
George Thornton	1877–1901	Secretary for Mines; Representative of the Government in Legislative Council (13 November 1885 − 21 December 1885)
John Watt	1861–1866, 1874–1890	
Edmund Webb	1882–1899	
James White	1874–1890	
Robert White	1888–1900	

== See also ==
- Fifth Robertson ministry
- Jennings ministry
- Fourth Parkes ministry
