= Members of the New South Wales Legislative Council, 1887–1889 =

Members of the New South Wales Legislative Council who served from 1887 to 1889 were appointed for life by the Governor on the advice of the Premier. This list includes members between the elections commencing on 4 February 1887 and the elections commencing on 1 February 1889. The President was Sir John Hay.

Although a loose party system had emerged in the Legislative Assembly at this time, there was no real party structure in the Council.

Name	Years in office	Office
Robert Abbott (Note: Robert Abbott resigned on 29 February 1888.)	1883–1888	
Edmund Barton (Note: Edmund Barton was appointed on 2 February 1887, and took his seat on 8 March 1887.)	1887–1891, 1897–1898	Attorney General; Representative of the Government in Legislative Council (17 January 1889 – 7 March 1889)
Richard Bowker (Note: 11 members were appointed on 30 December 1887, and took their seats on 8 February 1888.)	1888–1903	
William Busby (Note: William Busby died on 23 June 1887.)	1867–1887	
William Byrnes	1858–1861, 1861–1891	
Alexander Campbell	1864–1890	
Charles Campbell (Note: Charles Campbell died on 23 October 1888.)	1870–1888	
George Campbell (Note: George Campbell was appointed on 30 December 1887, and took his seat on 15 February 1888.)	1888–1890	
Samuel Charles	1885–1909	
James Chisholm (Note: James Chisholm died on 24 June 1888.)	1865–1888	
George Cox	1863–1901	
John Creed	1885–1930	
William Dalley (Note: William Dalley died on 28 October 1888.)	1870–1873, 1875–1880, 1883–1888	
Henry Dangar	1883–1917	
John Davies	1888–1896	
Leopold De Salis	1874–1898	
Alexander Dodds	1885–1892	
John Eales	1880–1894	
James Farnell (Note: James Farnell resigned on 17 February 1887 having been elected to the Legislative Assembly at the 1887 Redfern election.)	1885–1887	
Peter Faucett (Note: Peter Faucett was appointed on 9 April 1888, and took his seat on 18 April 1888.)	1888–1894	
Edward Flood (Note: Edward Flood died on 9 September 1888.)	1879–1888	
Andrew Garran (Note: 7 members were appointed on 15 February 1887, and took their seats on 8 March 1887.)	1887–1892, 1895–1901	
William Grahame	1875–1889	
William Halliday	1885–1892	
Sir John Hay	1867–1892	President
Richard Hill	1880–1895	
Frederick Humphery	1888–1908	
Archibald Jacob	1883–1900	Chairman of Committees (1 December 1887 – 28 May 1900)
Samuel Joseph	1881–1885, 1887–1893	
Andrew Kerr	1888–1907	
Philip King	1880–1904	
Edward Knox	1856–1857, 1882–1894	
John Lackey	1885–1903	Vice-President of the Executive Council (17 January 1889 – 7 March 1889)
George Lee	1882–1912	
George Lloyd	1887–1897	
William Long	1885–1909	
Francis Lord	1856–1861, 1864–1893	
John Lucas	1880–1902	
John Macintosh	1882–1911	
Charles Mackellar	1885–1903, 1903–1925	
William Macleay	1877–1891	
Sir William Manning	1861–1876, 1888–1895	
Charles Moore	1880–1895	
Henry Moore (Note: Henry Moore died on 29 June 1888.)	1868–1888	
Henry Mort	1882–1900	
Henry Moses	1885–1923	
James Neale	1883–1890	
James Norton	1879–1906	
Richard O'Connor	1888–1898	
Edward Ogilvie	1863–1889	
William Piddington (Note: William Piddington died on 25 November 1887.)	1879–1887	Chairman of Committees (17 March 1885 – 25 November 1887)
William Pigott	1887–1907	
Arthur Renwick	1888–1908	
John Richardson (Note: John Richardson resigned on 29 June 1887.)	1868–1887	
Richard Roberts	1882–1903	
Jeremiah Rundle	1882–1893	
Julian Salomons (Note: Julian Salomons was appointed on 7 March 1887, and took his seat on 8 March 1887)	1870–1871, 1887–1899	Representative of the Government; Vice-President of the Executive Council (20 January 1887 – 16 January 1889)
George Simpson	1885–1894	Attorney General (10 February 1888 – 16 January 1889)
Patrick Shepherd	1888–1903	
John Smith	1880–1895	
Sir Alfred Stephen	1856–1858, 1875–1879, 1879–1885, 1886–1890	
Septimus Stephen	1887–1900	
John Stewart	1879–1895	
William Suttor Jr.	1880–1900	
Samuel Terry (Note: Samuel Terry died on 21 September 1887.)	1882–1887	
George Thornton	1877–1901	
William Trickett	1888–1916	
Ebenezer Vickery	1887–1906	
William Walker	1888–1908	
James Watson	1887–1907	
John Watt	1861–1866, 1874–1890	
Edmund Webb	1882–1899	
James White	1874–1890	
Robert White	1888–1900	
Sir Robert Wisdom (Note: Robert Wisdom was appointed on 2 February 1887, but died on 16 March 1888 without taking his seat.)	1888	

== See also ==
- Fourth Parkes ministry
- Second Dibbs ministry
