= Members of the New South Wales Legislative Council, 1889–1891 =

Members of the New South Wales Legislative Council who served from 1889 to 1891 were appointed for life by the Governor on the advice of the Premier. This list includes members between the elections commencing on 1 February 1889 and the elections commencing on 17 June 1891. The President was Sir John Hay.

Although a loose party system had emerged in the Legislative Assembly at this time, there was no real party structure in the Council.

Name	Years in office	Office
Edmund Barton (Note: Edmund Barton resigned on 12 June 1891 to stand for the Legislative Assembly at the 1891 East Sydney election.)	1887–1891, 1897–1898	
Richard Bowker	1888–1903	
David Buchanan (Note: 8 members were appointed by the defeated Dibbs ministry on 22 February 1889, and took their seats on 27 February 1889.) (Note: David Buchanan died on 4 April 1890.)	1889–1890	
William Byrnes	1858–1861, 1861–1891	
Alexander Campbell (Note: Alexander Campbell died on 24 July 1890.)	1864–1890	
George Campbell (Note: George Campbell died on 2 September 1890.)	1888–1890	
William Campbell (Note: 3 members were appointed on 15 April 1890, and took their seats on 29 April 1890.)	1890–1906	
Samuel Charles	1885–1909	
Edward Combes (Note: 4 members were appointed on 24 March 1891, and took their seats on 19 May 1891.)	1891–1895	
George Cox	1863–1901	
John Creed	1885–1930	
Henry Dangar	1883–1917	
John Davies	1888–1896	
George Day	1889–1906	
Leopold De Salis	1874–1898	
Alexander Dodds	1885–1892	
John Eales	1880–1894	
James Ellis	1891–1894	
Peter Faucett	1888–1894	
Andrew Garran	1887–1892, 1895–1901	
William Grahame (Note: The seats of William Grahame and Edward Ogilvie were declared vacant due to absence on 27 February 1889.)	1875–1889	
William Halliday	1885–1892	
Sir John Hay	1867–1892	President
Louis Heydon	1889–1918	
Richard Hill	1880–1895	
James Hoskins	1889–1900	
Frederick Humphery	1888–1908	
Archibald Jacob	1883–1900	Chairman of Committees
Sir Patrick Jennings (Note: Sir Patrick Jennings was appointed on 15 April 1890, and took his seat on 22 May 1890.)	1867–1869, 1890–1897	
Samuel Joseph	1881–1885, 1887–1893	
Henry Kater	1889–1924	
Andrew Kerr	1888–1907	
Philip King	1880–1904	
Edward Knox	1856–1857, 1882–1894	
John Lackey	1885–1903	
William Laidley	1889–1897	
Walter Lamb	1889–1893	
George Lee	1882–1912	
George Lloyd	1887–1897	
William Long	1885–1909	
Francis Lord	1856–1861, 1864–1893	
John Lucas	1880–1902	
John Macintosh	1882–1911	
Charles Mackellar	1885–1903, 1903–1925	
Normand MacLaurin	1889–1914	
Sir William Macleay	1877–1891	
Sir William Manning	1861–1876, 1888–1895	
Charles Moore	1880–1895	
Henry Mort	1882–1900	
Henry Moses	1885–1923	
James Neale (Note: James Neale died on 27 December 1890.)	1883–1890	
James Norton	1879–1906	
Richard O'Connor	1888–1898	
Edward Ogilvie	1863–1889	
William Pigott	1887–1907	
Charles Pilcher	1891–1916	
Arthur Renwick	1888–1908	
Alban Riley	1891–1893	
Charles Roberts	1890–1925	
Richard Roberts	1882–1903	
Jeremiah Rundle (Note: The seat of John Watt was declared vacant due to absence on 29 April 1890.)	1882–1893	
Sir Julian Salomons	1870–1871, 1887–1899	
George Simpson	1885–1894	Attorney General
Patrick Shepherd	1888–1903	
John Smith	1880–1895	
Sir Alfred Stephen (Note: Sir Alfred Stephen resigned on 27 October 1890 to become acting Governor of New South Wales.)	1856–1858, 1875–1879, 1879–1885, 1886–1890	
Septimus Stephen	1887–1900	
John Stewart	1879–1895	
Francis Suttor (Note: Francis Suttor was appointed on 21 February 1889, and took his seat on 27 February 1889.) (Note: Francis Suttor resigned on 13 June 1891 to stand for the Legislative Assembly at the 1891 Bathurst election.)	1889–1891, 1900–1915	
William Suttor Jr.	1880–1900	Representative of the Government; Vice-President of the Executive Council
Harman Tarrant	1890–1896	
George Thornton	1877–1901	
William Trickett	1888–1916	
Ebenezer Vickery	1887–1906	
William Walker	1888–1908	
James Watson	1887–1907	
John Watt	1861–1866, 1874–1890	
Edmund Webb	1882–1899	
James White (Note: James White died on 13 July 1890.)	1874–1890	
Robert White	1888–1900	

== See also ==
- Fifth Parkes ministry
