= Members of the New South Wales Legislative Council, 1891–1894 =

Members of the New South Wales Legislative Council who served from 1891 to 1894 were appointed for life by the Governor on the advice of the Premier. This list includes members between the elections commencing on 17 June 1891 and the election on 17 July 1894. The President was Sir John Hay until his death on 10 January 1892 and then Sir John Lackey.

Although a loose party system had emerged in the Legislative Assembly at this time, there was no real party structure in the Council.

Name	Years in office	Office
Richard Bowker	1888–1903	
Alexander Brown (Note: 9 members were appointed on 30 April 1892 and took their seats on 30 August 1892.)	1892–1926	
William Byrnes (Note: William Byrnes died on 25 October 1891.)	1858–1861, 1861–1891	
William Campbell	1890–1906	
Samuel Charles	1885–1909	
Edward Combes	1891–1895	
George Cox	1863–1901	
John Creed	1885–1930	
Thomas Dalton	1892–1901	
Henry Dangar	1883–1917	
John Davies	1888–1896	
George Day	1889–1906	
Leopold De Salis	1874–1898	
Alexander Dodds (Note: Alexander Dodds died on 6 February 1892.)	1885–1892	
John Eales (Note: John Eales died on 30 April 1894.)	1880–1894	
James Ellis (Note: James Ellis resigned on 9 July 1894 to successfully contest the election for Newcastle West.)	1891–1894	
Peter Faucett (Note: Peter Faucett died on 22 May 1894.)	1888–1894	
Andrew Garran (Note: Andrew Garran resigned on 19 October 1892 to accept appointment as president of the New South Wales Council of Arbitration.)	1887–1892, 1895–1901	
Charles Goodchap	1892–1896	
Edward Greville	1892–1903	
William Halliday (Note: William Halliday died on 25 August 1892.)	1885–1892	
Sir John Hay (Note: Sir John Hay died on 20 January 1892.)	1867–1892	President (8 July 1873 – 10 January 1892)
Charles Heydon (Note: Charles Heydon was appointed on 15 December 1893.)	1893–1898, 1898–1900	Attorney General (15 December 1893 – 2 August 1894)
Louis Heydon	1889–1918	
Richard Hill	1880–1895	
James Hoskins	1889–1900	
Frederick Humphery	1888–1908	
Solomon Hyam	1892–1901	
Archibald Jacob	1883–1900	Chairman of Committees
Sir Patrick Jennings	1867–1870, 1890–1897	
Samuel Joseph (Note: Samuel Joseph died on 24 August 1893.)	1881–1885, 1887–1893	
Henry Kater	1889–1924	
Andrew Kerr	1888–1907	
Philip King	1880–1904	
Edward Knox	1856–1857, 1882–1894	
Sir John Lackey	1885–1903	President (26 January 1892 – 23 May 1903)
William Laidley	1889–1897	
Walter Lamb (Note: Walter Lamb resigned on 3 November 1893 due to bankruptcy.)	1889–1893	
George Lee	1882–1912	
George Lloyd	1887–1897	
William Long	1885–1909	
Francis Lord (Note: The seat of Francis Lord was declared vacant due to absence on 19 January 1893.)	1856–1861, 1864–1893	
John Lucas	1880–1902	
John Macintosh	1882–1911	
Charles Mackellar	1885–1903, 1903–1925	
Normand MacLaurin	1889–1914	Representative of the Government; Vice-President of the Executive Council (5 April 1893 – 2 August 1894)
Sir William Macleay (Note: Sir William Macleay died on 7 December 1891.)	1877–1891	
Sir William Manning	1861–1876, 1888–1895	
Charles Moore	1880–1895	
Henry Mort	1882–1900	
Henry Moses	1885–1923	
James Norton	1879–1906	
Daniel O'Connor (Note: Daniel O'Connor was appointed on 29 July 1891, and resigned on 22 December 1892 due to bankruptcy.)	1891–1892, 1895–1898	
Richard O'Connor	1888–1898	Minister of Justice (23 October 1891 – 14 December 1893)
William Pigott	1887–1907	
Charles Pilcher	1891–1916	
Arthur Renwick	1888–1908	
Alban Riley (Note: Alban Riley resigned on 16 November 1893 due to bankruptcy.)	1891–1893	
Charles Roberts	1890–1925	
Richard Roberts	1882–1903	
Jeremiah Rundle (Note: Jeremiah Rundle died on 6 March 1893.)	1882–1893	
Alexander Ryrie	1892–1909	
Sir Julian Salomons	1870–1871, 1887–1899	Representative of the Government; Vice-President of the Executive Council (23 October 1891 – 26 January 1893)
George Simpson	1885–1894	
Patrick Shepherd	1888–1903	
John Smith	1880–1895	
Thomas Smith	1892–1902	
Septimus Stephen	1887–1900	
John Stewart	1879–1895	
William Suttor Jr.	1880–1900	
Harman Tarrant	1890–1896	
George Thornton	1877–1901	
John Toohey	1892–1903	
William Trickett	1888–1916	
Ebenezer Vickery	1887–1906	
William Walker	1888–1908	
James Watson	1887–1907	
Edmund Webb	1882–1899	
Robert White	1888–1900	
John Young (Note: John Young died on 16 November 1893.)	1892–1893	

== See also ==
- Third Dibbs ministry
