= Dibbs =

Dibbs is a surname. Notable people with the surname include:

- Charlie Dibbs (1905–1960), Australian rules footballer
- Crustified Dibbs, better known by his stage name R.A. the Rugged Man, is an American rapper
- Eddie Dibbs (born 1951), retired American tennis player also nicknamed "Fast Eddie"
- George Dibbs KCMG (1834–1904), Australian politician who was Premier of New South Wales on three occasions
- John Dibbs, master mariner during 1822–1835 around the colony of New South Wales, New Zealand and the Society Islands
- Mr. Dibbs (born Brad Forste), American DJ and hip hop producer
- Thomas Allwright Dibbs (1833–1923), Australian banker

== See also ==
- Dibbs ministry (disambiguation) may refer to one of the three ministries of George Dibbs, Premier of New South Wales
  - Dibbs ministry (1885)
  - Dibbs ministry (1889)
  - Dibbs ministry (1891–94)
- Dibb (disambiguation)
- Dibs (disambiguation)
- McDibbs
