= Parkes ministry (1889–1891) =

Fifth Parkes ministry
- 26th Cabinet of the Colony of New South Wales

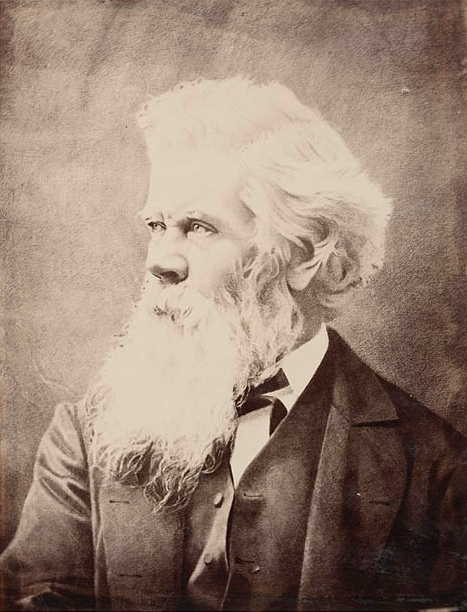
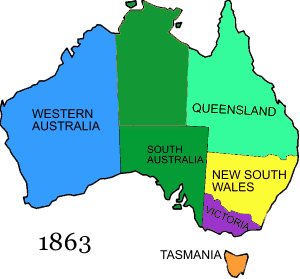
- Premier Sir Henry Parkes and the Colony of New South Wales (1863–1900)
- Date formed: 8 March 1889
- Date dissolved: 22 October 1891

People and organisations
- Monarch: Queen Victoria
- Governor: Lord Carrington / The Earl of Jersey
- Premier: Sir Henry Parkes
- No. of ministers: 10
- Member party: Free Trade Party
- Status in legislature: Minority government
- Opposition party: Protectionist Party
- Opposition leader: George Dibbs

History
- Predecessor: Second Dibbs ministry
- Successor: Third Dibbs ministry

The fifth Parkes ministry was the 26th ministry of the Colony of New South Wales, and was led by the seventh Premier, Sir Henry Parkes. It was the fifth and final occasion that Parkes was Premier. The title of Premier was widely used to refer to the Leader of Government, but was not a formal position in the government until 1920. Instead the Premier was appointed to another portfolio, usually Colonial Secretary. Having served in the New South Wales Legislative Council between 1854 and 1856, Parkes was elected in the first free elections for the New South Wales Legislative Assembly held in 1856, however resigned from Parliament later that year. He served in the Assembly on several occasions, between 1858 and 1870, being forced to resign on 4 occasions due to his personal insolvency. (Note: Henry Parkes resigned due to financial difficulties in 1856 (Sydney City), 1858 (Cumberland (North Riding)), 1870 (Kiama) and 1871 (Kiama). He would again resign due to financial difficulties in 1887 (St Leonards).) He came to power as Premier on the first occasion in 1872, serving as Premier for a period of three years. However, Parkes lost the confidence of the Assembly following Governor Robinson's decision to release of the bushranger Frank Gardiner led to the defeat of the ministry in 1875.

John Robertson served as Premier between 1875 and 1877, before Robertson was defeated at the 1877 election. Parkes formed his second ministry in a challenging environment where both Parkes and Robertson shared equal representation in the Legislative Assembly and business was sometimes at a standstill. Parkes' second term as Colonial Premier lasted just 147 days, with the Farnell ministry giving both Parkes and Robertson reprieve for 12 months, prior to Parkes and Robertson forming an alliance government in the third Parkes ministry. The retirement of Robertson pitted Parkes against George Dibbs and after the governments of both Dibbs and Sir Patrick Jennings faltered under public debt, Parkes formed his fourth ministry, leading the newly established the Free Trade Party and holding office for nearly two years.

Parkes lost a vote on the floor of the Assembly in January 1889 and Dibbs assumed office. Parliament was dissolved on 19 January 1889 and an election was held in February. There was a significant swing to the Protectionists, gaining 29 seats, however it was insufficient to command a majority of the Legislative Assembly and Parkes resumed the premiership, where he agitated for the formation of a Commonwealth of Australia against a somewhat hostile New South Wales Colonial government. The July 1891 election saw the emergence of the Australian Labor Party, winning 35 seats, with no party having a majority. Parkes held on as Premier until October 1891 when he again lost a vote in the Legislative Assembly, causing Parkes to resign as Premier and leader of the Free Trade Party.

Under the constitution, ministers were required to resign to recontest their seats in a by-election when appointed. These by-elections were usually uncontested and on this occasion all of the ministers were re-elected unopposed.

This ministry covers the period from 8 March 1889 until 22 October 1891.

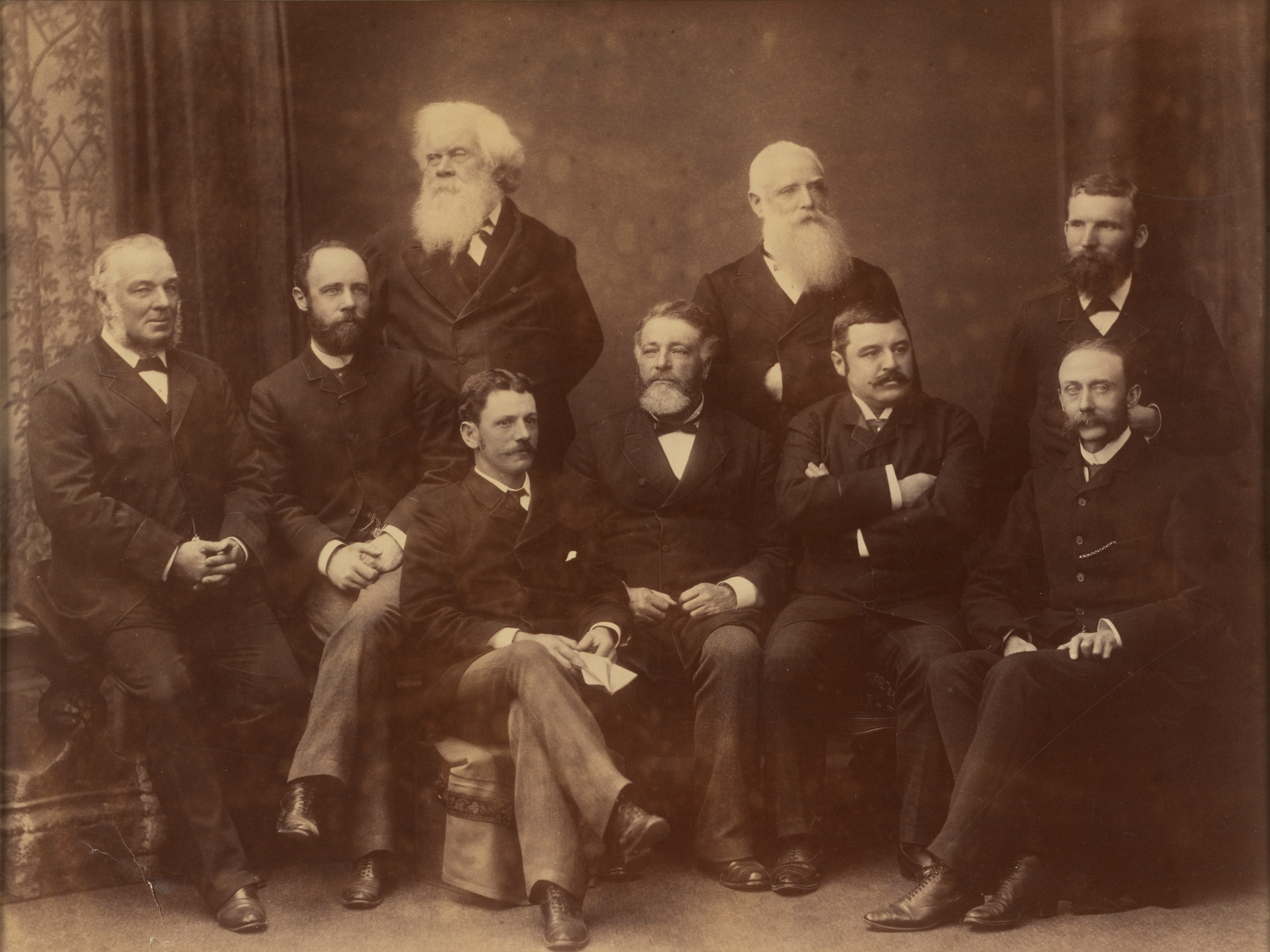

== Composition of ministry ==
| Portfolio | Minister | Party | Term start | Term end | Term length |
|---|---|---|---|---|---|
| Premier; Colonial Secretary; Registrar of Records | Sir Henry Parkes | Free Trade | 8 March 1889 | 22 October 1891 | 2 years, 228 days |
| Colonial Treasurer; Collector of Internal Revenue | William McMillan | Free Trade | 8 March 1889 | 27 July 1891 | 2 years, 141 days |
| Colonial Treasurer; Collector of Internal Revenue | Bruce Smith | Free Trade | 14 August 1891 | 22 October 1891 | 69 days |
| Attorney General | George Simpson QC, MLC | Free Trade | 8 March 1889 | 22 October 1891 | 2 years, 228 days |
| Secretary for Lands | James Brunker | Free Trade | 8 March 1889 | 22 October 1891 | 2 years, 228 days |
| Secretary for Public Works | Bruce Smith | Free Trade | 8 March 1889 | 13 August 1891 | 2 years, 158 days |
| Secretary for Public Works | James Young | Free Trade | 14 August 1891 | 22 October 1891 | 69 days |
| Minister of Justice | Albert Gould | Free Trade | 8 March 1889 | 22 October 1891 | 2 years, 228 days |
| Minister of Public Instruction | Joseph Carruthers | Free Trade | 8 March 1889 | 22 October 1891 | 2 years, 228 days |
| Secretary for Mines / Secretary for Mines and Agriculture (Note: The title of the Secretary for Mines was changed to Secretary for Mines and Agriculture from 28 February 1890.) | Sydney Smith | Free Trade | 8 March 1889 | 22 October 1891 | 2 years, 228 days |
| Postmaster-General | Daniel O'Connor (Note: Daniel O'Connor was defeated at the 1891 election for West Sydney and was appointed to the Legislative Council on 29 July 1891.) | Free Trade | 8 March 1889 | 22 October 1891 | 2 years, 228 days |
| Representative of the Government in Legislative Council | William Suttor Jr. MLC | Free Trade | 8 March 1889 | 22 October 1891 | 2 years, 228 days |
| Vice-President of the Executive Council | William Suttor Jr. MLC | Free Trade | 30 April 1889 | 22 October 1891 | 2 years, 175 days |

Ministers were members of the Legislative Assembly unless otherwise noted.

== See also ==
  - Members of Legislative Assembly
  - (1889–1891)
  - (1891–1894)
  - Members of Legislative Council
  - (1889–1891)
  - (1891–1894)
  - Parkes ministries
  - First (1872–1875)
  - Second (1877)
  - Third (1878–1883)
  - Fourth (1887–1889)

== Notes ==
| Preceded by Second Dibbs ministry | Fifth Parkes ministry 1889–1891 | Succeeded by Third Dibbs ministry |
