= Parkes ministry (1887–1889) =

Fourth New South Wales government ministry led by Henry Parkes

Fourth Parkes ministry
- 24th Cabinet of the Colony of New South Wales

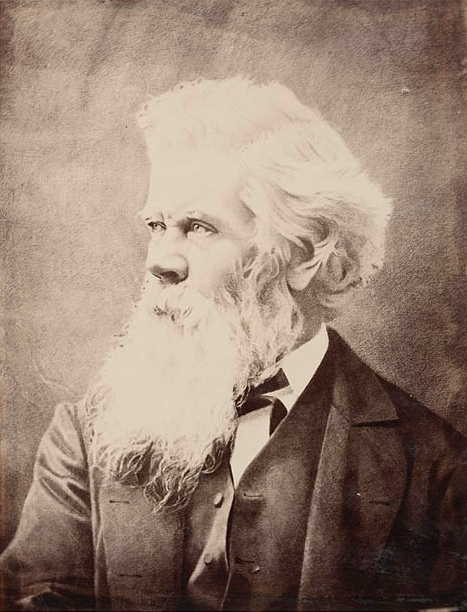
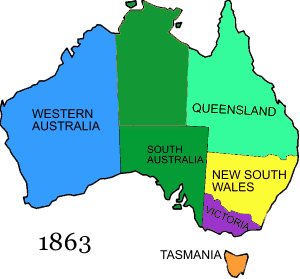
- Premier Sir Henry Parkes and the Colony of New South Wales (1863–1900)
- Date formed: 20 January 1887
- Date dissolved: 16 January 1889

People and organisations
- Monarch: Queen Victoria
- Governor: Lord Carrington
- Premier: Sir Henry Parkes
- No. of ministers: 10
- Member party: Free Trade Party
- Status in legislature: Minority government
- Opposition party: Protectionist Party
- Opposition leader: George Dibbs

History
- Predecessor: Jennings ministry
- Successor: Second Dibbs ministry

The fourth Parkes ministry was the 24th ministry of the Colony of New South Wales, and was led by the seventh Premier, Sir Henry Parkes. It was the fourth of five occasions that Parkes was Premier.

Having served in the New South Wales Legislative Council between 1854 and 1856, Parkes was elected in the first free elections for the New South Wales Legislative Assembly held in 1856, however resigned from Parliament later that year. He served in the Assembly on several occasions, between 1858 and 1870, being forced to resign on at least one occasion due to his personal insolvency. He came to power as Premier on the first occasion in 1872, serving as Premier for a period of three years. However, Parkes lost the confidence of the Assembly following Governor Robinson's decision to release of the bushranger Frank Gardiner led to the defeat of the ministry in 1875.

John Robertson served as Premier between 1875 and 1877, before Robertson was defeated at the 1877 election. Parkes formed his second ministry in a challenging environment where both Parkes and Robertson shared equal representation in the Legislative Assembly and business was sometimes at a standstill. Parkes' second term as Colonial Premier lasted just 147 days, with the Farnell ministry giving both Parkes and Robertson reprieve for 12 months, prior to Parkes and Robertson forming an alliance government in the third Parkes ministry.

The retirement of Robertson pitted Parkes against George Dibbs and after the governments of both Dibbs and Sir Patrick Jennings faltered under public debt, Parkes formed this, his fourth ministry.

The title of Premier was widely used to refer to the Leader of Government, but was not a formal position in the government until 1920. Instead the Premier was appointed to another portfolio, usually Colonial Secretary.

There was no party system in New South Wales politics prior to 1887. Under the constitution, ministers in the Legislative Assembly were required to resign to recontest their seats in a by-election when appointed. The initial ministers were not required to face a by-election as they had been appointed prior to the general election in February 1887. Of the subsequent appointments, Bernhard Wise (South Sydney) was narrowly re-elected, while James Brunker (East Maitland) was re-elected unopposed.

This ministry covers the period from 20 January 1887 until 16 January 1889.

== Composition of ministry ==
Portfolio	Minister	Party	Term start	Term end	Term length
Premier; Colonial Secretary	Sir Henry Parkes	Free Trade	20 January 1887	16 January 1889	1 year, 362 days
Vice-President of the Executive Council	Sir Henry Parkes	Free Trade	20 January 1887	6 March 1887	45 days
Vice-President of the Executive Council	Julian Salomons MLC	Free Trade	7 March 1887	16 January 1889	1 year, 315 days
Representative of the Government in Legislative Council	Julian Salomons MLC	Free Trade	20 January 1887	16 January 1889	1 year, 362 days
Colonial Treasurer	John Burns	Free Trade	20 January 1887	16 January 1889	1 year, 362 days
Attorney General	William Foster	Free Trade	20 January 1887	18 May 1887	118 days
Attorney General	Bernhard Wise	Free Trade	27 May 1887	7 February 1888	256 days
Attorney General	George Simpson MLC	Free Trade	10 February 1888	16 January 1889	341 days
Secretary for Lands	Thomas Garrett	Free Trade	20 January 1887	19 January 1888	364 days
Secretary for Lands	Sir Henry Parkes	Free Trade	26 July 1888	23 August 1888	28 days
Secretary for Lands	James Brunker	Free Trade	29 August 1888	16 January 1889	140 days
Secretary for Public Works	John Sutherland	Free Trade	20 January 1887	16 January 1889	1 year, 362 days
Minister of Justice	William Clarke	Free Trade	20 January 1887	16 January 1889	1 year, 362 days
Minister of Public Instruction	James Inglis	Free Trade	20 January 1887	16 January 1889	1 year, 362 days
Secretary for Mines	Francis Abigail	Free Trade	20 January 1887	16 January 1889	1 year, 362 days
Postmaster-General	Charles Roberts	Free Trade	20 January 1887	16 January 1889	1 year, 362 days

Ministers were members of the Legislative Assembly unless otherwise noted.

== See also ==
  - Members of Legislative Assembly
  - (1885–1887)
  - (1887–1889)
  - Members of Legislative Council
  - (1885–1887)
  - (1887–1889)
  - Parkes ministries
  - First (1872–1875)
  - Second (1877)
  - Third (1878–1883)
  - Fifth (1889–1891)

Preceded by Jennings ministry	Fourth Parkes ministry 1887–1889	Succeeded by Second Dibbs ministry
