= Stuart ministry =

New South Wales government ministry led by Alexander Stuart

- 20th Cabinet of the Colony of New South Wales

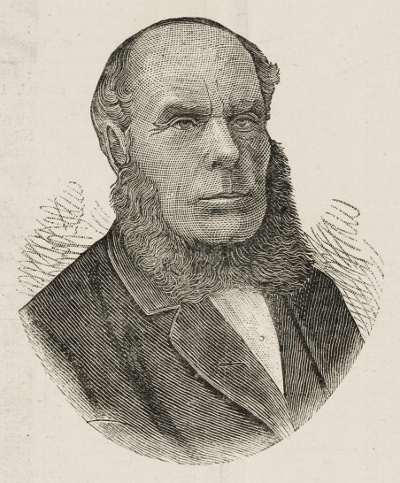
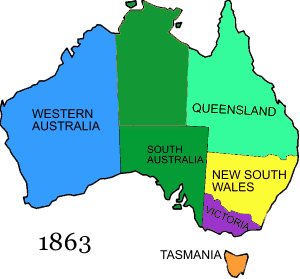
- Premier Alexander Stuart and the Colony of New South Wales (1863–1900)
- Date formed: 5 January 1883
- Date dissolved: 6 October 1885

People and organisations
- Monarch: Queen Victoria
- Governor: Lord Augustus Loftus
- Head of government: Alexander Stuart
- No. of ministers: 10
- Member party: unaligned
- Status in legislature: Minority government
- Opposition party: unaligned
- Opposition leader: Henry Parkes

History
- Predecessor: Third Parkes ministry
- Successor: First Dibbs ministry

The Stuart ministry was the 20th ministry of the Colony of New South Wales, and was led by Sir Alexander Stuart. Stuart was elected to the New South Wales Legislative Assembly in 1874.

The title of Premier was widely used to refer to the Leader of Government, but not enshrined in formal use until 1920.

There was no party system in New South Wales politics until 1887. Under the constitution, ministers in the Legislative Assembly were required to resign to recontest their seats in a by-election when appointed. Such ministerial by-elections were usually uncontested and on this occasion a poll was required for East Sydney where George Reid was easily re-elected and Newtown where Henry Copeland was narrowly defeated. Copeland was able to return to the assembly the following week due to a vacancy at East Sydney. The 6 other ministers, Sir Alexander Stuart (Illawarra), George Dibbs (St Leonards), Henry Cohen (West Maitland), James Farnell (New England), Francis Wright (Redfern) and Joseph Abbott (Gunnedah ), were re-elected unopposed. The minister subsequently appointed, William Trickett (Paddington) was also re-elected unopposed.

In January 1884 the Committee of Elections and Qualifications held that an error in the drafting of the constitution meant that George Reid could not be validly appointed Minister of Public Instruction, and declared his seat vacant. Reid was defeated in the resulting by-election in February 1884.

This ministry covers the period from 5 January 1883 until 6 October 1885. Suffering a paralytic stroke whilst in office, William Dalley was acting Premier from late 1884, with Dalley deciding to send a contingent of troops to the Sudan. Stuart resumed his duties in May 1885 before resigning in October due to continued ill health. His Treasurer, George Dibbs, succeeded Stuart as Premier.

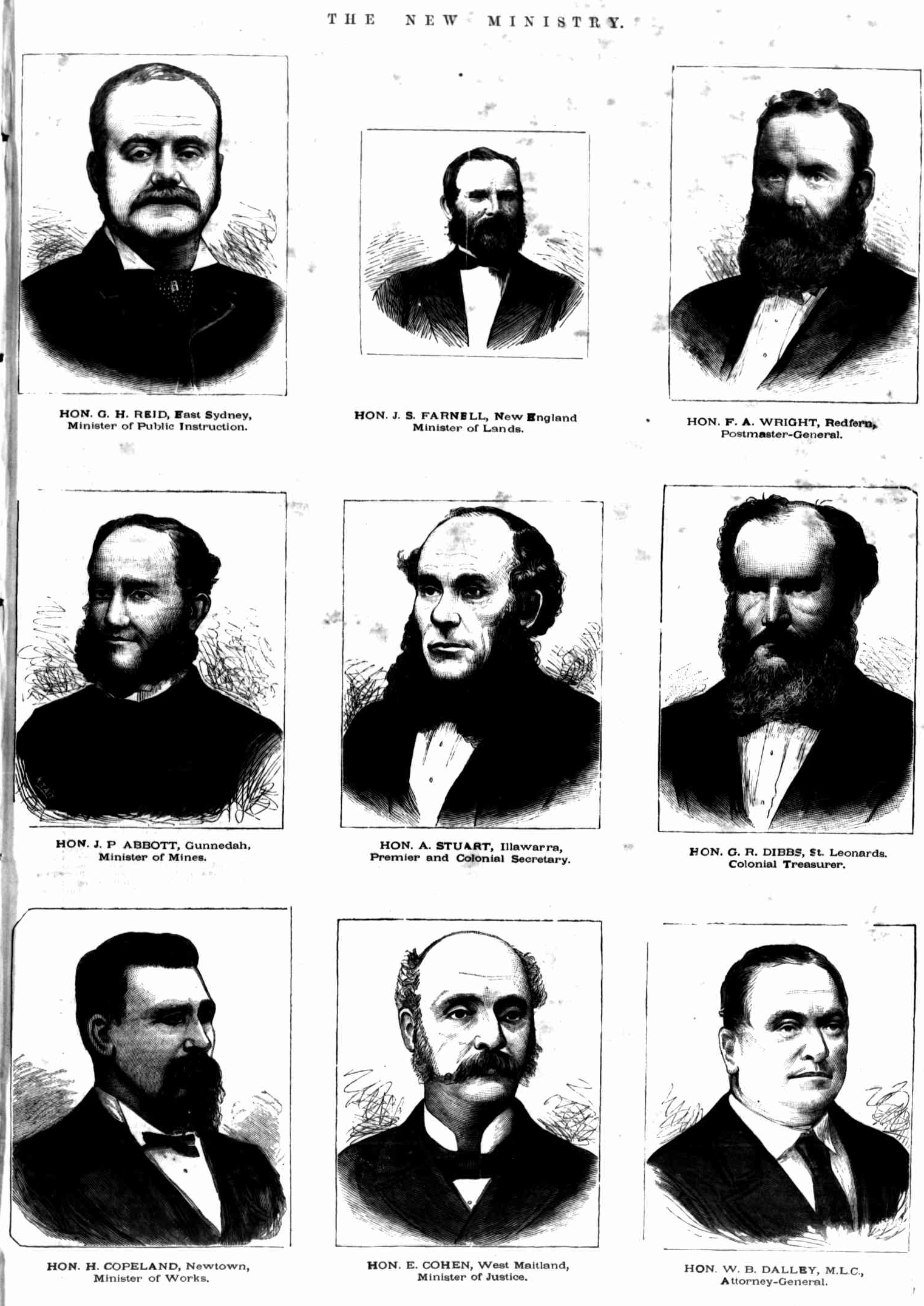

== Composition of ministry ==
Portfolio	Minister	Term start	Term end	Term length
Premier; Colonial Secretary	Sir Alexander Stuart (Note: Due to the illness of Sir Alexander Stuart, in addition to his other responsibilities, William Dalley was also charged with the duties of Colonial Secretary from 7 October 1884 to 11 May 1885.)	5 January 1883	6 October 1885	2 years, 274 days
Colonial Treasurer	George Dibbs	5 January 1883	6 October 1885	2 years, 274 days
Minister of Public Instruction	George Reid	5 January 1883	6 March 1884	1 year, 61 days
Minister of Public Instruction	William Trickett	2 May 1884	6 October 1885	1 year, 157 days
Minister of Justice	Henry Cohen	5 January 1883	6 October 1885	2 years, 274 days
Attorney General; Representative of the Government in Legislative Council	William Dalley MLC	5 January 1883	6 October 1885	2 years, 274 days
Secretary for Lands	James Farnell	5 January 1883	6 October 1885	2 years, 274 days
Secretary for Public Works	Henry Copeland	5 January 1883	28 March 1883	82 days
Secretary for Public Works	Francis Wright	28 May 1883	6 October 1885	862 days
Postmaster-General	Francis Wright	5 January 1883	27 May 1883	142 days
Postmaster-General	William Trickett	28 May 1883	1 May 1884	339 days
Postmaster-General	James Norton MLC	2 May 1884	6 October 1885	1 year, 157 days
Secretary for Mines	Joseph Abbott	5 January 1883	6 October 1885	2 years, 274 days
Vice-President of the Executive Council	Sir Patrick Jennings	5 January 1883	31 July 1883	207 days

Ministers are members of the Legislative Assembly unless otherwise noted.

== See also ==
- Self-government in New South Wales
- Members of the New South Wales Legislative Assembly, 1882–1885
- Members of the New South Wales Legislative Council, 1882–1885

Preceded by Third Parkes ministry	Stuart ministry 1883–1885	Succeeded by First Dibbs ministry
