= Robertson ministry (1885–1886) =

Fifth New South Wales government ministry led by John Robertson

Fifth Robertson ministry
- 22nd Cabinet of the Colony of New South Wales

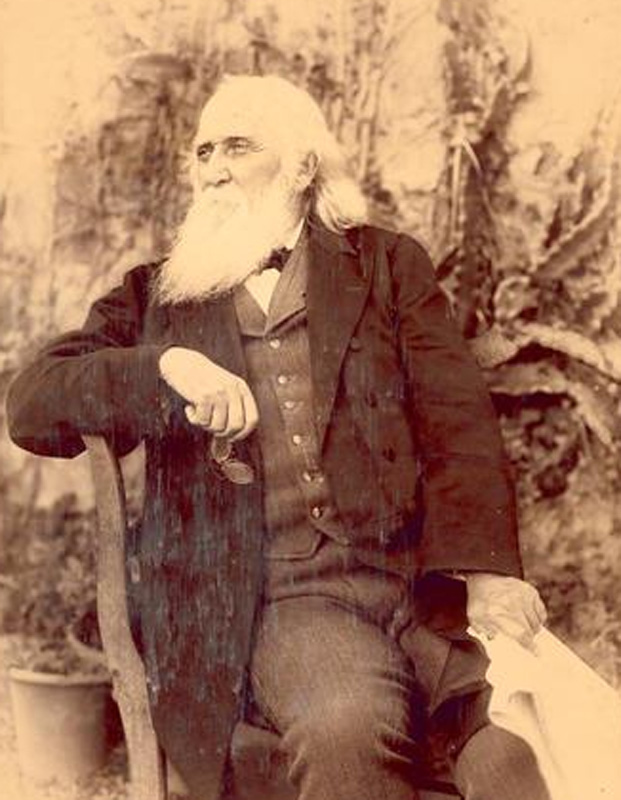
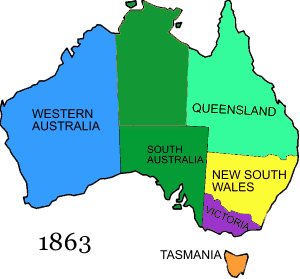
- Premier Sir John Robertson and the Colony of New South Wales (1863–1900)
- Date formed: 22 December 1885
- Date dissolved: 25 February 1886

People and organisations
- Monarch: Queen Victoria
- Governor: The Lord Carrington
- Head of government: Sir John Robertson
- No. of ministers: 9
- Member party: unaligned
- Status in legislature: Minority government
- Opposition party: unaligned
- Opposition leader: Henry Parkes; George Dibbs

History
- Predecessor: First Dibbs ministry
- Successor: Jennings ministry

The fifth Robertson ministry was the 22nd ministry of the Colony of New South Wales, and was led by the Premier, Sir John Robertson. It was the fifth and final occasion that Robertson was Premier. Robertson was elected in the first free elections for the New South Wales Legislative Assembly held in March 1856.

The title of Premier was widely used to refer to the Leader of Government, but was not a formal position in the government until 1920. Instead the Premier was appointed to another portfolio, usually Colonial Secretary.

There was no party system in New South Wales politics until 1887. Under the constitution, ministers in the Legislative Assembly were required to resign to recontest their seats in a by-election when appointed. Such ministerial by-elections were usually uncontested and on this occasion all of the ministers were re-elected unopposed. Louis Heydon resigned on 4 February 1886 because he disagreed with the suggested property tax, and was not replaced as Minister of Justice.

This ministry covers the period from 22 December 1885 until 25 February 1886, when Robertson's government faltered due to the destablishing influence of his old foe, Sir Henry Parkes. Robertson was succeeded as Premier by Sir Patrick Jennings, and retired from parliament in June 1886.

== Composition of ministry ==
Portfolio	Minister	Term start	Term end	Term length
Premier; Colonial Secretary	Sir John Robertson	22 December 1885	25 February 1886	65 days
Colonial Treasurer	John Burns	22 December 1885	25 February 1886	65 days
Minister of Public Instruction	James Young	22 December 1885	25 February 1886	65 days
Minister of Justice	Louis Heydon	22 December 1885	4 February 1886	44 days
Attorney General; Representative of the Government in Legislative Council	George Simpson MLC	22 December 1885	25 February 1886	65 days
Secretary for Lands	Gerald Spring	22 December 1885	25 February 1886	65 days
Secretary for Public Works	Jacob Garrard	22 December 1885	25 February 1886	65 days
Postmaster-General	Daniel O'Connor	22 December 1885	25 February 1886	65 days
Secretary for Mines	Robert Vaughn	22 December 1885	25 February 1886	65 days

Ministers are members of the Legislative Assembly unless otherwise noted.

== See also ==
  - Members of Parliament
  - 1885–1887 Legislative Assembly
  - Legislative Council
  - Robertson ministries
  - First (1860–1861)
  - Second (1868–1870)
  - Third (1875–77)
  - Fourth (1877)

Preceded by First Dibbs ministry	Fifth Robertson ministry 1885–1886	Succeeded by Jennings ministry
