= Thomas Cadell =

Thomas Cadell may refer to:

- Thomas Cadell (VC) (1835–1919), Scottish soldier and recipient of the Victoria Cross
- Thomas Cadell (politician) (1831–1896), English-born Australian politician
- Thomas Cadell (publisher) (1742–1802), English bookseller and publisher
- Thomas Cadell the younger (1773–1836), bookseller with Cadell & Davies
