= Dibbs ministry =

The Dibbs ministry may refer to one of the three ministries of George Dibbs, Premier of New South Wales:

- Dibbs ministry (1885) — first ministry
- Dibbs ministry (1889) — second ministry
- Dibbs ministry (1891–94) — third ministry
