= Members of the New South Wales Legislative Assembly, 1885–1887 =

Members of the New South Wales Legislative Assembly who served in the 12th parliament of New South Wales held their seats between from 1885 to 1887. Elections for the twelfth Legislative Assembly were held between 16 and 31 October 1885 with parliament first meeting on 17 November 1885. The Assembly was expanded from 113 to 122 members elected in 37 single member electorates, 24 two member electorates, 7 three member electorate and 4 four member electorates. The parliament had a maximum term of 3 years but was dissolved on 26 January 1886 after 14 months. The Premiers during this parliament were George Dibbs until 22 December 1885, Sir John Robertson until 26 February 1886, Sir Patrick Jennings until 20 January 1887 and Sir Henry Parkes.

Name	Electorate	Years in office
Joseph Abbott	Gunnedah	1880–1901
Francis Abigail	West Sydney	1880–1891
Ezekiel Baker	Carcoar	1870-1877 1879-1881 1884-1887
Robert Barbour	Murray	1877-1880 1882-1894
Edmund Barton	East Sydney	1879–1887, 1891–1894, 1898–1900
Russell Barton (Note: Both members for Bourke, Russell Barton and William Sawers, resigned on 2 December 1886. A writ was issued for a by-election, which was held on 21 January 1887. The writ was not returned however as the parliament was dissolved on 26 January.)	Bourke	1880–1886
Alexander Bolton	Murrumbidgee	1885–1887
Alexander Bowman	Hawkesbury	1877-1882 1885-1892
Herbert Brown	Durham	1875–1898
Thomas Browne	Mudgee	1885–1889
James Brunker	East Maitland	1880–1904
Nathaniel Bull	Central Cumberland	1885–1887
Sydney Burdekin	East Sydney	1880-1882 1884-1891 1892-1894
Michael Burke	Tamworth	1885–1887
John Burns	Hunter	1861–1869, 1872–1891
Robert Butcher	Paddington	1882–1887
Angus Cameron (Note: Kiama MLA Harman Tarrant resigned in December 1886. The resulting by-election on 13 January 1887 was won by Angus Cameron.)	Kiama	1874–1885 1887-1889 1894-1896
William Campbell (Note: Gwydir MLA William Campbell resigned in May 1886. The resulting by-election on 10 June 1886 was won by Thomas Hassall.)	Gwydir	1868–1869 1880-1886
George Cass	Bogan	1880–1892
John Chanter	Murray	1885–1901
Henry Clarke	Eden	1869–1894, 1895–1904
William Clarke	Orange	1880–1889
Charles Collins	Namoi	1885–1887 1890-1898
Thomas Colls (Note: Yass Plains MLA Louis Heydon retired in December 1886. The resulting by-election on 20 December 1886 was won by Thomas Colls.)	Yass Plains	1886–1894
Walter Coonan	Forbes	1877-1880 1882-1887
Henry Copeland	East Sydney	1877–1883, 1883–1895, 1895–1900
John Cramsie	Balranald	1880–1887
Joseph Creer	Northumberland	1885–1891
Thomas Dalton	Orange	1882–1891
John Davies	South Sydney	1874–1882 1885-1887
Henry Dawson	Monaro	1885–1894
George Day	Albury	1874–1889
George Dibbs	Murrumbidgee	1874–1877, 1882–1895
Thomas Ewing	Richmond	1885–1901
David Ferguson	Wellington	1882–1891
William Fergusson	Glen Innes	1880–1887
Robert Fitzgerald	Upper Hunter	1885–1901
James Fletcher	Newcastle	1880–1891
Archibald Forsyth	South Sydney	1885–1887
William Foster	Newtown	1880–1882 1885-1888
Charles Garland	Carcoar	1885–1891
Jacob Garrard	Balmain	1880–1898
Thomas Garrett	Camden	1860–1871, 1872–1891
James Garvan	Eden	1880–1894
Frederick Gibbes	Newtown	1882–1888
James Gormly	Murrumbidgee	1885–1904
Albert Gould	Patrick's Plains	1882–1898
Mark Hammond	Canterbury	1884–1887
Thomas Hassall	Gwydir	1886–1901
John Hawthorne	Balmain	1885–1891 1894-1904
James Hayes	Hume	1885–1904
William Henson	Canterbury	1880-1882 1885-1889
Louis Heydon	Yass Plains	1882–1886
Patrick Hogan	Richmond	1885–1887 1889-1895
William Holborow	Argyle	1880–1894
Frederick Humphery	Shoalhaven	1882–1887
Thomas Hungerford	Upper Hunter	1875-1875 1877-1882 1885-1887
Solomon Hyam	Balmain	1885–1887
James Inglis	New England	1885–1894
Isaac Ives	St Leonards	1885–1889
Sir Patrick Jennings	Bogan	1869–1872 1880-1887
Travers Jones	Tumut	1885–1891 1894-1898
William Judd	Canterbury	1885–1887
Alexander Kethel	West Sydney	1885–1889
John Kidd	Camden	1880–1882, 1885–1887 1889-1904
Charles Lee	Tenterfield	1884–1920
Robert Levien	Tamworth	1880–1889, 1889–1913
George Lloyd	Newcastle	1869–1877, 1880–1882, 1885-1887
Lewis Lloyd	West Macquarie	1884–1887
William Lyne	Hume	1880–1901
Andrew Lysaght	Illawarra	1885–1887 1891
William MacGregor	Wentworth	1885–1887
James Mackinnon (Note: Young MLA William Watson's election victory was overturned by the Qualifications Committee. James Mackinnon was declared to be the Member for Young on 22 December 1885.)	Young	1882–1894
Andrew McCulloch	Central Cumberland	1877–1888
John Meeks	Glebe	1885–1887
Ninian Melville	Northumberland	1880–1887 1889-1894
Samuel Wilkinson Moore	Inverell	1885–1889 1894-1910
John Neild	Paddington	1885–1889 1891-1894 1895-1901
Daniel O'Connor	West Sydney	1877-1891 1900-1904
Joseph Olliffe	South Sydney	1882–1887
Edward O'Sullivan	Queanbeyan	1885–1910
Sir Henry Parkes	St Leonards	1856, 1858, 1859–1861, 1864–1870, 1872–1895
Varney Parkes	Central Cumberland	1885–1888, 1891–1900 1907-1913
William Proctor (Note: New England MLA William Proctor resigned and then successfully recontested his seat at the resulting by-election on 10 January 1887.)	New England	1880–1887
John Purves	Clarence	1880–1887
Edward Quin	Wentworth	1882–1887
George Reid	East Sydney	1880-1884 1885-1901
Arthur Renwick	Redfern	1879-1882 1885-1887
Charles Roberts	Hastings and Manning	1882–1890
Sir John Robertson	Mudgee	1856–1861, 1862–1865, 1865–1866, 1866–1870, 1870–1877, 1877–1878, 1882–1886
Andrew Ross	Molong	1880–1904
Alexander Ryrie	Braidwood	1880–1891
William Sawers	Bourke	1885–1886 1898-1901
Lyall Scott (Note: Wollombi MLA Lyall Scott retired in December 1886 citing ill-health. The resulting by-election on 17 December 1886 was won by Richard Stevenson.)	Wollombi	1885–1886
John See	Grafton	1880–1904
John Shepherd	East Macquarie	1877-1880 1885-1887 1889-1891
Thomas Slattery	Boorowa	1880-1885 1887-1895
James Smith	Newtown	1885–1887 1901-1907
Robert Smith	Macleay	1870–1889
Sydney Smith	East Macquarie	1882–1898 1900
Thomas Smith	Nepean	1877-1887 1895-1904
Gerald Spring	Young	1869–1872 1882-1887
Harold Stephen	Monaro	1885–1889
Septimus Stephen	Canterbury	1882–1887
Richard Stevenson	Wollombi	1885–1886
Alfred Stokes	Forbes	1882–1891
Francis Suttor	Bathurst	1875-1887 1891-1894 1898-1900
John Sutherland	Redfern	1860–1881, 1882–1889
Francis Tait	Argyle	1885–1887
Walter Targett	Hartley	1882–1887
Harman Tarrant	Kiama	1880–1887
Adolphus Taylor	Mudgee	1882–1887 1890-1891
Hugh Taylor	Parramatta	1882–1894
William Teece	Goulburn	1872–1890
Richard Thompson	West Maitland	1885–1891
James Toohey	South Sydney	1885–1891
William Trickett	Paddington	1880–1887
Robert Vaughn	Grenfell	1880–1894
William Wall (Note: Mudgee MLA John Robertson retired in June 1886 citing ill-health, financial difficulties and dejection at the loss of government. The resulting by-election on 2 July 1886 was won by William Wall.)	Mudgee	1886–1895
Jack Want	Gundagai	1885–1894
William Watson	Young	1880–1882 1885
Robert White	Gloucester	1882–1887
Robert Wilkinson	Balranald	1880–1894
William Wilkinson	Glebe	1885–1889
Thomas Williamson	Redfern	1885–1887
Robert Wisdom	Morpeth	1859–1872, 1874–1887
James Young	Hastings and Manning	1880–1901 1904-1907
John Young	West Sydney	1885–1887

== See also ==
- Dibbs ministry
- Fifth Robertson ministry
- Jennings ministry
- Fourth Parkes ministry

== Notes ==
There was no party system in New South Wales politics until 1887. Under the constitution, ministers were required to resign to recontest their seats in a by-election when appointed. These by-elections are only noted when the minister was defeated; in general, he was elected unopposed.
