= Dibbs ministry (1889) =

Second New South Wales government ministry led by George Dibbs

Second Dibbs ministry
- 25th Cabinet of the Colony of New South Wales

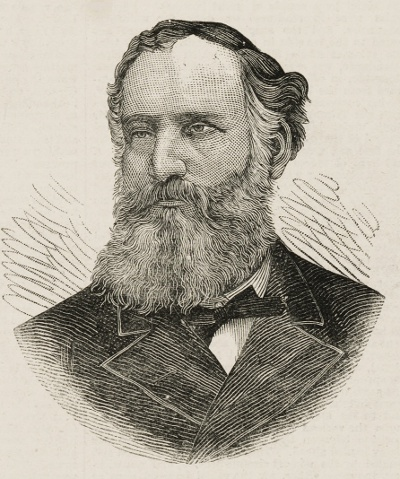
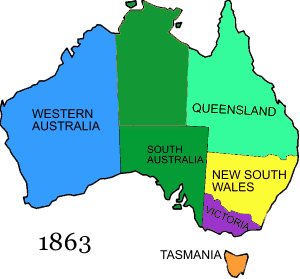
- Premier George Dibbs and the Colony of New South Wales (1863–1900)
- Date formed: 17 January 1889
- Date dissolved: 7 March 1889

People and organisations
- Monarch: Queen Victoria
- Governor: The Lord Carrington
- Premier: George Dibbs
- No. of ministers: 10
- Member party: unaligned
- Status in legislature: Minority government
- Opposition party: Free Trade Party
- Opposition leader: Henry Parkes

History
- Predecessor: Fourth Parkes ministry
- Successor: Fifth Parkes ministry

The second Dibbs ministry was the 25th ministry of the Colony of New South Wales, and was the second of three occasions of being led by the tenth Premier, George Dibbs. Dibbs was elected to the New South Wales Legislative Assembly in 1874. In a period of great financial stress for the Colony, this ministry covers just 49 days from 17 January 1889 until 7 March 1889. Dibbs took over as Premier on the first occasion in October 1885 following resignation of the Alexander Stuart due to ill-health, with his ministry lasting for 75 days. Dibbs served as Colonial Secretary in the Jennings ministry, before it too suffered budgetary pressures. It was during this time that the party system was formed in New South Wales with Sir Henry Parkes leading the Free Trade Party. Dibbs had been elected as an independent free trader, however his opposition to Parkes caused Dibbs to align himself with the Protectionist Party. Dibbs had assumed office when Parkes lost a vote on the floor of the Assembly. Parliament was dissolved on 19 January 1889 and an election was held in February. There was a significant swing to the Protectionists, gaining 29 seats, however it was insufficient to command a majority of the Legislative Assembly and Parkes resumed the premiership.

Under the constitution, ministers in the Legislative Assembly were required to resign to recontest their seats in an election when appointed. On this occasion however no by-elections were required as the ministers had all been appointed prior to the general election.

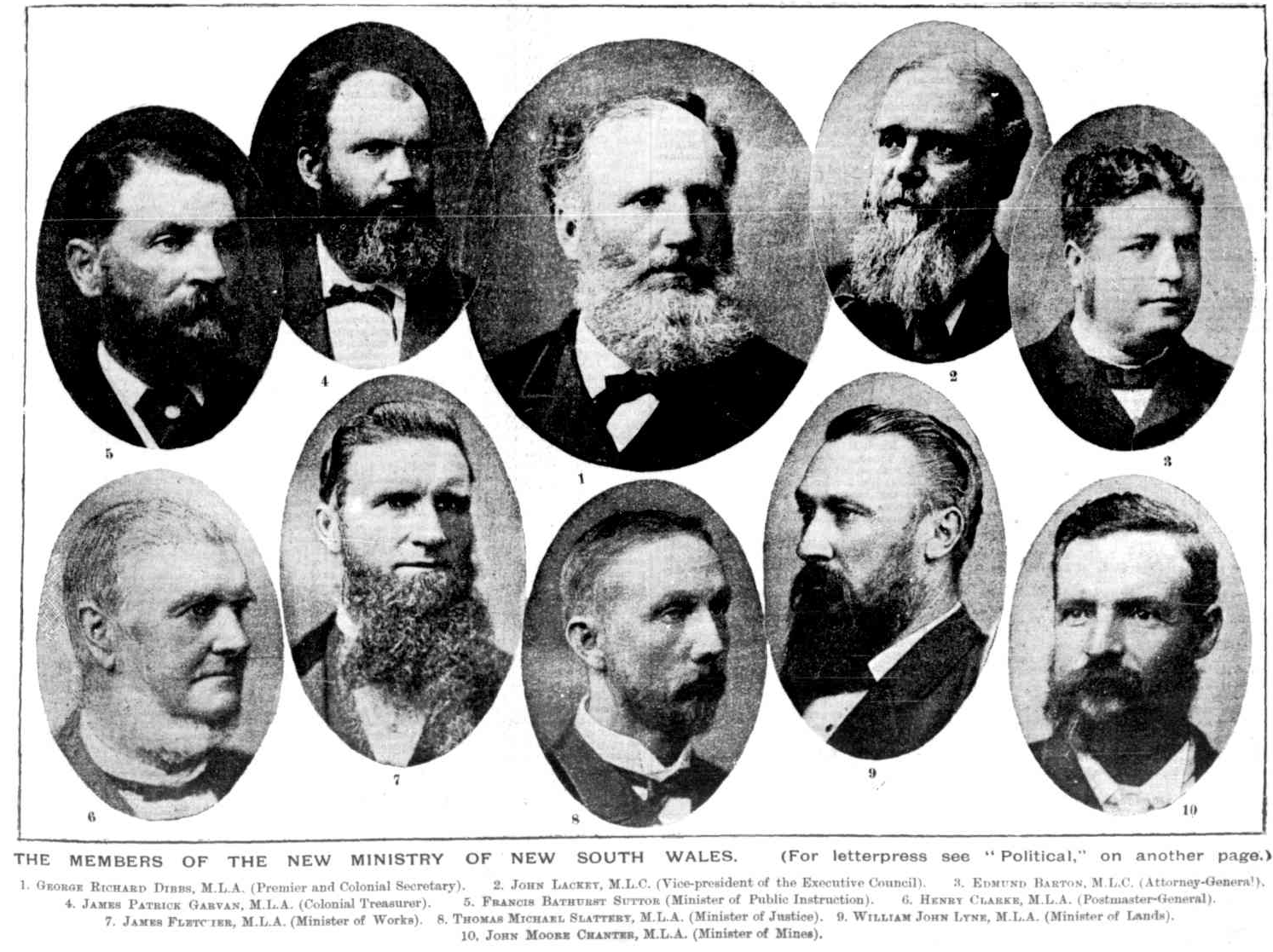

== Composition of ministry ==
Portfolio	Minister	Party	Term start	Term end	Term length
Premier; Colonial Secretary	George Dibbs	Protectionist	17 January 1889	7 March 1889	49 days
Colonial Treasurer	James Garvan	Protectionist	17 January 1889	7 March 1889	49 days
Attorney General; Representative of the Government in Legislative Council	Edmund Barton MLC	Protectionist	17 January 1889	7 March 1889	49 days
Secretary for Lands	William Lyne	Protectionist	17 January 1889	7 March 1889	49 days
Secretary for Public Works	James Fletcher	Protectionist	17 January 1889	7 March 1889	49 days
Minister of Justice	Thomas Slattery	Protectionist	17 January 1889	7 March 1889	49 days
Minister of Public Instruction	Francis Suttor MLC (Note: Francis Suttor was not a member of parliament at the time of his appointment. He was a candidate for Bathurst at the 1889 election but was unsuccessful, and was appointed to the Legislative Council on 21 February 1889.)	Protectionist	17 January 1889	7 March 1889	49 days
Secretary for Mines	John Chanter	Protectionist	17 January 1889	7 March 1889	49 days
Postmaster-General	Henry Clarke	Protectionist	17 January 1889	7 March 1889	49 days
Vice-President of the Executive Council	John Lackey MLC	Protectionist	17 January 1889	7 March 1889	49 days

Ministers were members of the Legislative Assembly unless otherwise noted.

== See also ==
  - Members of Legislative Assembly
  - (1887–1889)
  - (1889–1891)
  - Members of Legislative Council
  - (1887–1889)
  - (1889–1891)
  - Dibbs ministries
  - First (1885)
  - Third (1891–1894)

== Notes ==
Preceded by Fourth Parkes ministry	Second Dibbs ministry 1889	Succeeded by Fifth Parkes ministry
