= Duckenfield, New South Wales =

Duckenfield
- Town
- Coordinates: 32°43′54″S 151°41′04″E
- Country: Australia
- State: New South Wales
- Region: Hunter
- LGA: City of Maitland

Government
  - State electorate: Maitland
  - Federal division: Paterson

Population
  - Total: 92 (SAL 2021)
- Postcode: 2321
- County: Northumberland
- Parish: Alnwick

Duckenfield is a locality in the City of Maitland, New South Wales, Australia. It lies on the south bank of the Hunter River. The first European settler in the locality was John Eales who had two estates Berry Park and Duckenfield House both along Duckenfield Road. The area is known for breeding racehorses. At the 2016 census, it had a population of 108.

== Duckenfield ==
John Eales was granted 2100 acres on the Hunter River and was assigned six convicts. It was built out of Sydney sandstone with a plain verandah. In 1822, Eales purchased a property from Dr Moran. The property had 45 room and was two stories In 1870s, John Eales junior completed some extensions. The property was sold to BHP in 1916, which they demolished the property for building material in 1917.

== Duckenfield Park Creamery and Butter Factory ==
In 1895 John Eales decided to establish a creamery and butter factory. In 1897 the factory won first prize for butter at Royal Agricultural Show. In 1898, the factory started to be exported to England and other countries. On 1 January 1902 became a cooperative under the management of William McMillian. In 1906 the factory moved to Morpeth. Eighteen months later the company was factory facing bankruptcy was purchased by

Bowthrone Butter Factory for £410
