= Dibbs ministry (1885) =

First Dibbs ministry
- 21st Cabinet of the Colony of New South Wales

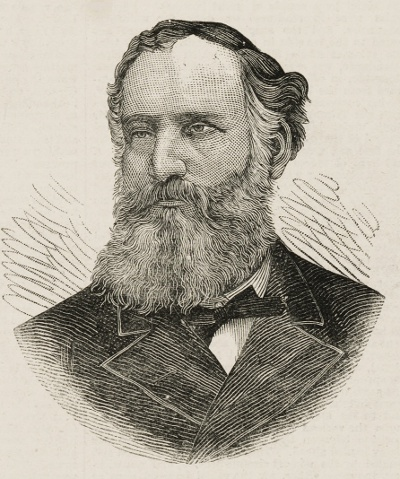
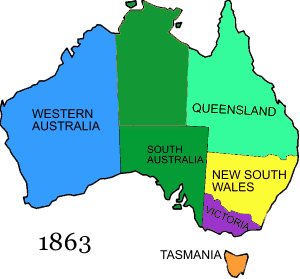
- Premier George Dibbs and the Colony of New South Wales (1863–1900)
- Date formed: 7 October 1885
- Date dissolved: 21 December 1885

People and organisations
- Monarch: Queen Victoria
- Governor: Lord Augustus Loftus / The Lord Carrington
- Head of government: George Dibbs
- No. of ministers: 10
- Member party: unaligned
- Status in legislature: Minority government
- Opposition party: unaligned
- Opposition leader: John Robertson

History
- Predecessor: Stuart ministry
- Successor: Fifth Robertson ministry

The first Dibbs ministry was the 21st ministry of the Colony of New South Wales, and was the first of three occasions of being led by the Premier, George Dibbs. Dibbs was elected to the New South Wales Legislative Assembly in 1874.

The title of Premier was widely used to refer to the Leader of Government, but was not a formal position in the government until 1920. Instead the Premier was appointed to another portfolio, usually Colonial Secretary, but on this occasion Dibbs kept the portfolio of Colonial Treasurer he had held in the Stuart ministry.

There was no party system in New South Wales politics until 1887. Under the constitution, ministers in the Legislative Assembly were required to resign to recontest their seats in a by-election when appointed. Such ministerial by-elections were usually uncontested and on this occasion most of the ministers had been appointed prior to the election in October 1885. The two new ministers, Thomas Slattery (Boorowa) and William Lyne (The Hume), were re-elected unopposed.

This ministry covers the period from 7 October 1885 until 21 December 1885. Dibbs took over as Premier following the October 1885 resignation of Sir Alexander Stuart due to ill-health. At the subsequent election Dibbs' government polled badly and despite attempting to govern; less than three months later when it became clear that there would be a budget deficit of over £1m. Dibbs was succeeded by Sir John Robertson.

== Composition of ministry ==
| Portfolio | Minister | Term start | Term end | Term length |
|---|---|---|---|---|
| Premier | George Dibbs | 7 October 1885 | 21 December 1885 | 75 days |
| Colonial Treasurer | George Dibbs | 10 October 1885 | 21 December 1885 | 72 days |
| Colonial Secretary | George Dibbs | 7 October 1885 | 9 October 1885 | 2 days |
| Colonial Secretary | Sir Patrick Jennings | 10 October 1885 | 21 December 1885 | 72 days |
| Minister of Public Instruction | William Trickett | 7 October 1885 | 21 December 1885 | 75 days |
| Representative of the Government in Legislative Council | George Thornton MLC | 13 November 1885 | 21 December 1885 | 38 days |
| Representative of the Government in Legislative Council | James Farnell MLC | 7 October 1885 | 9 October 1885 | 2 days |
| Minister of Justice | James Farnell MLC | 7 October 1885 | 9 October 1885 | 2 days |
| Minister of Justice | Thomas Slattery | 2 November 1885 | 21 December 1885 | 49 days |
| Attorney General | Jack Want | 7 October 1885 | 21 December 1885 | 75 days |
| Secretary for Lands | Joseph Abbott | 7 October 1885 | 21 December 1885 | 75 days |
| Secretary for Public Works | Henry Badgery | 7 October 1885 | 31 October 1885 | 24 days |
| Secretary for Public Works | William Lyne | 2 November 1885 | 21 December 1885 | 49 days |
| Postmaster-General | John See | 7 October 1885 | 21 December 1885 | 75 days |
| Secretary for Mines | Francis Wright | 7 October 1885 | 17 October 1885 | 10 days |
| Secretary for Mines | George Thornton MLC | 13 November 1885 | 21 December 1885 | 38 days |

Ministers are members of the Legislative Assembly unless otherwise noted.

== See also ==
  - Members of Legislative Assembly
  - (1882–1885)
  - (1885–1887)
  - Members of Legislative Council
  - (1882–1885)
  - (1885–1887)
  - Dibbs ministries
  - Second (1889)
  - Third (1891–1894)

| Preceded by Stuart ministry | First Dibbs ministry 1885 | Succeeded by Fifth Robertson ministry |
