= Jennings ministry =

New South Wales government ministry led by Sir Patrick Jennings

- 23rd Cabinet of the Colony of New South Wales

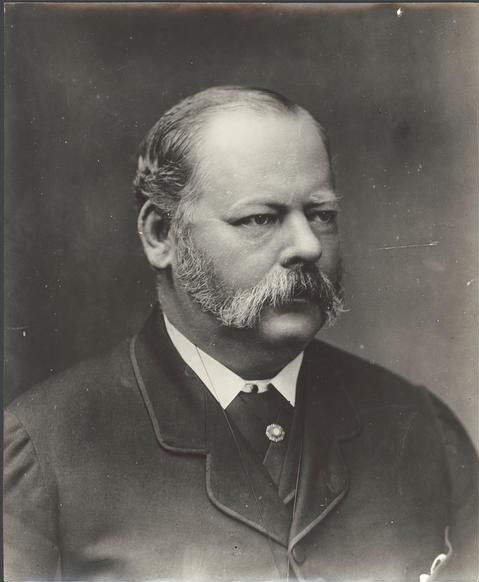
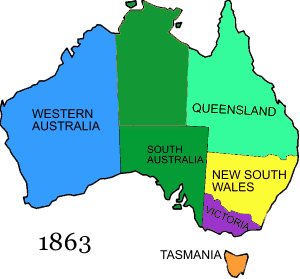
- Premier Sir Patrick Jennings and the Colony of New South Wales (1863–1900)
- Date formed: 26 February 1886
- Date dissolved: 19 January 1887

People and organisations
- Monarch: Queen Victoria
- Governor: The Lord Carrington
- Premier: Sir Patrick Jennings
- No. of ministers: 10
- Member party: unaligned
- Status in legislature: Minority government
- Opposition party: unaligned
- Opposition leader: John Robertson; Henry Parkes

History
- Predecessor: Fifth Robertson ministry
- Successor: Fourth Parkes ministry

The Jennings ministry was the 23rd ministry of the Colony of New South Wales, and was led by the eleventh Premier, Sir Patrick Jennings, and the first Roman Catholic to hold the office of Colonial Premier. Jennings was first elected to the New South Wales Legislative Assembly at the 1869–70 election, and then again in 1880.

The title of Premier was widely used to refer to the Leader of Government, but was not a formal position in the government until 1920. Instead the Premier was appointed to another portfolio, usually Colonial Secretary, but on this occasion Jenning chose the portfolio of Colonial Treasurer.

There was no party system in New South Wales politics until 1887. Under the constitution, ministers in the Legislative Assembly were required to resign to recontest their seats in a by-election when appointed. Such ministerial by-elections were usually uncontested and on this occasion a poll was required for Bathurst (Francis Suttor) and Redfern (Arthur Renwick) however both were re-elected. The other ministers were re-elected unopposed.

This ministry covers the period from 26 February 1886 until 19 January 1887. Jennings took over as Premier following the February 1886 resignation of Sir John Robertson. Jennings' ministry was beset by financial difficulties, lasted only 11 months, and was succeeded by Henry Parkes.

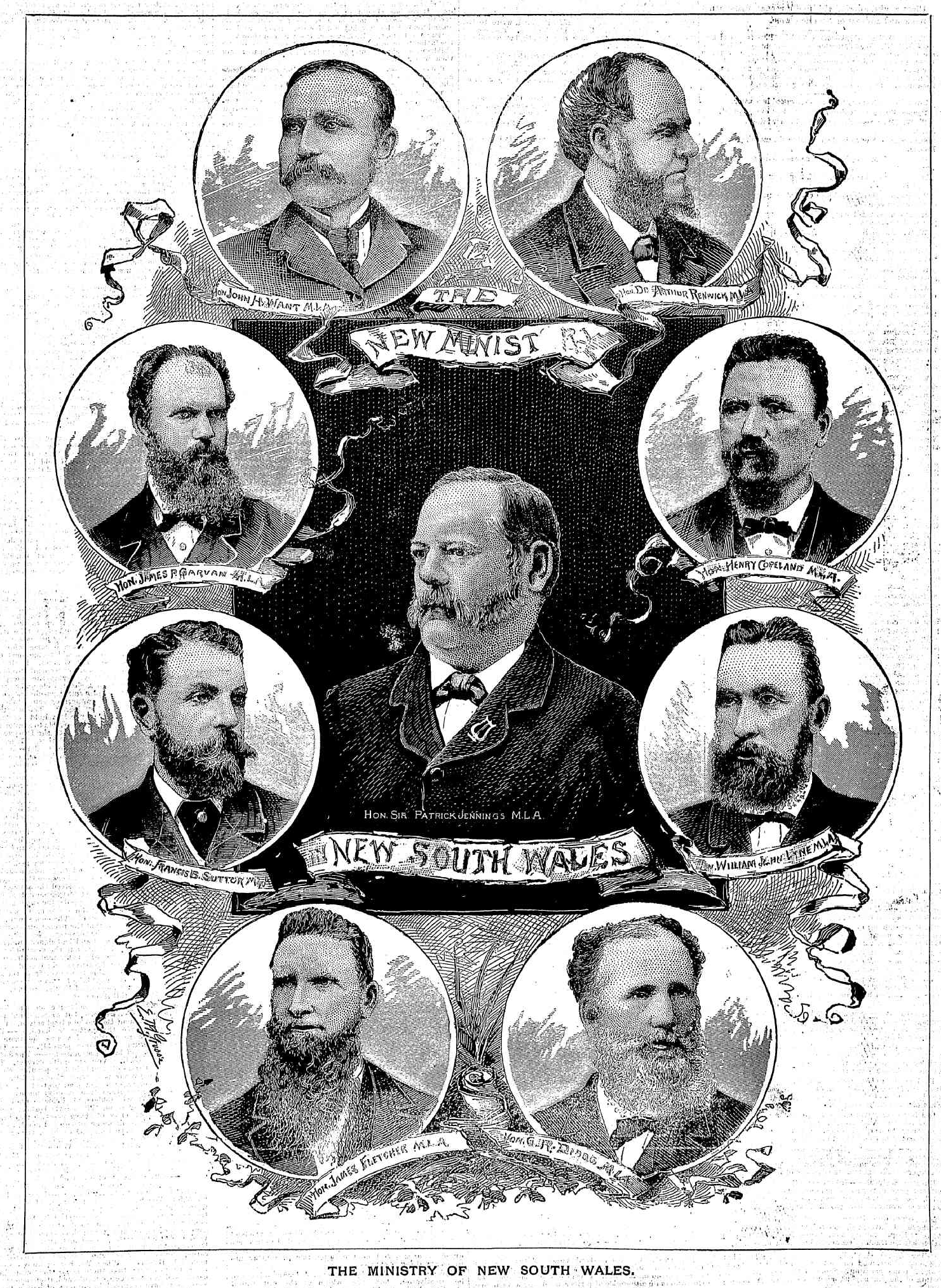

== Composition of ministry ==
| Portfolio | Minister | Term start | Term end | Term length |
|---|---|---|---|---|
| Premier; Colonial Treasurer | Sir Patrick Jennings | 26 February 1886 | 19 January 1887 | 327 days |
| Colonial Secretary | George Dibbs | 26 February 1886 | 19 January 1887 | 327 days |
| Minister of Public Instruction | Arthur Renwick | 26 February 1886 | 19 January 1887 | 327 days |
| Minister of Justice | James Garvan | 26 February 1886 | 19 January 1887 | 327 days |
| Attorney General | Jack Want | 26 February 1886 | 19 January 1887 | 327 days |
| Secretary for Lands | Henry Copeland | 26 February 1886 | 19 January 1887 | 327 days |
| Secretary for Public Works | William Lyne | 26 February 1886 | 19 January 1887 | 327 days |
| Postmaster-General | Francis Suttor | 26 February 1886 | 19 January 1887 | 327 days |
| Secretary for Mines | James Fletcher | 26 February 1886 | 23 December 1886 | 300 days |
| Secretary for Mines | Charles Mackellar MLC | 24 December 1886 | 19 January 1887 | 24 days |
| Representative of the Government in Legislative Council; Vice-President of the Executive Council | Charles Mackellar MLC | 26 February 1886 | 23 December 1886 | 300 days |

Ministers are members of the Legislative Assembly unless otherwise noted.

== See also ==
  - Members of Parliament
  - 1885–1887 Legislative Assembly
  - Legislative Council

| Preceded by Fifth Robertson ministry | Jennings ministry 1886–1887 | Succeeded by Fourth Parkes ministry |
