= Alexander Gordon (judge) =

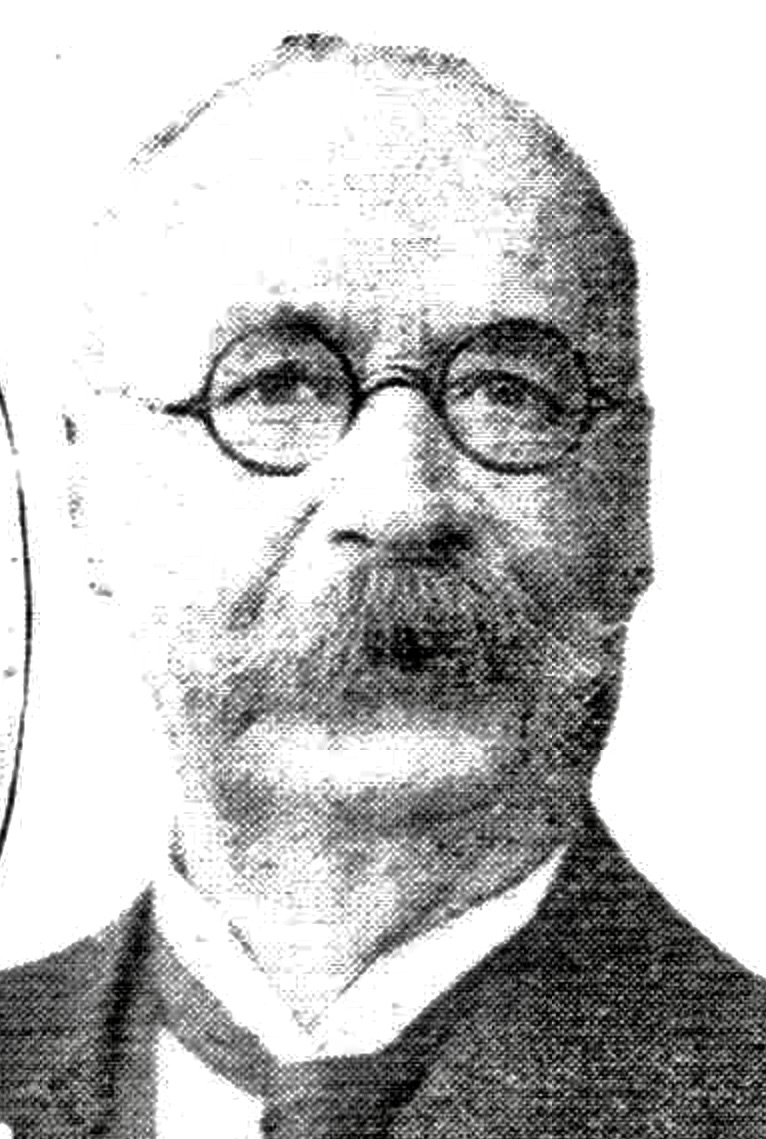
Sir Alexander Gordon

Sir Alexander Gordon (1858 – 7 January 1942) was an Australian lawyer, a judge of the Supreme Court of New South Wales from 1910 to 1928.

== History ==
Gordon was born in Redfern, Sydney, the son of Alexander Gordon MLC, and his wife Annie Gordon, née Chambers. Their home in his younger days was at 25 Nelson Street, Woollahra, which later became the Karitane Mothercraft Centre. He was educated at Repton, England, and returned to Australia around 1878. After serving his papers he was called to the Bar and practised law in various towns in NSW. He was appointed to the Supreme Court in 1910 retiring in 1928, the last 12 years in the Divorce Court. He was knighted in June 1930.

His remains were privately cremated after a funeral service at Woollahra.

== Other interests ==
Gordon was at various times:

- chairman of the Hospital Saturday Fund

a member of

- the council of Cranbrook School
- the council of St Luke's Private Hospital, Potts Point

president of

- Sydney Lawn Tennis Club
- N.S.W. Cricket Association, and was made a life member

vice-president of

- Sydney Philharmonic Society
- Sydney Madrigal Society
- St John Ambulance Association

and served for years on the advisory board of the Karitane Mothercraft Training Centre.

== Family ==
On 26 September 1906 Gordon married the Welsh contralto Margaret Thomas, who was in Australia with J. C. Williamson's Royal Comic Opera Company. Gordon and his fiancée (escorted by a lady friend) travelled by RMS Mongolia to Britain, and the ceremony took place in Wales. They had two children:

- Alexander Gordon (19 October 1908 – ) married Elizabeth Jean Shannon on 26 September 1936.
- Anne Gordon
