= Dibb (surname) =

Dibb is an English, topographic surname for someone living in a hollow, from Middle English dyppe. Notable people with the name include:

- Bronwyn Dibb (born 1997), New Zealand trampoline gymnast
- Kirra Dibb (born 1997), Australia international rugby league footballer
- Mike Dibb (born 1940), English documentary filmmaker
- Osvaldo Domínguez Dibb (1940–2024), Paraguayan politician, businessman
- Paul Dibb (born 1939), Australian academic and defence analyst
- Saul Dibb (born 1968), British film director and screenwriter
- Thomas Townend Dibb (1807–1875), English lawyer

== See also ==
- Dibb (disambiguation)
