= Dibb =

Dibb may refer to:

- Dibb (surname), a list of people with the name
- The River Dibb in England
