= Dibs =

Dibs may refer to:

- Pekmez, Arabic fruit molasses
- "Dibs" (song), a 2015 song by Kelsea Ballerini
- The subject of Dibs in Search of Self, an emotionally crippled boy
- Mr Dibs (born 1964), a British rock musician
- Nestlé Dibs, a frozen snack
- Dibs, an alternative name for the game of knucklebones or jacks
- The name used in Chicago, US, for the practice of using a parking chair to save a shoveled-out parking space

== See also ==
- DIB (disambiguation)
