= John Smith (New South Wales politician, born 1821) =

Professor of chemistry and physics in Australia (1821–1885)

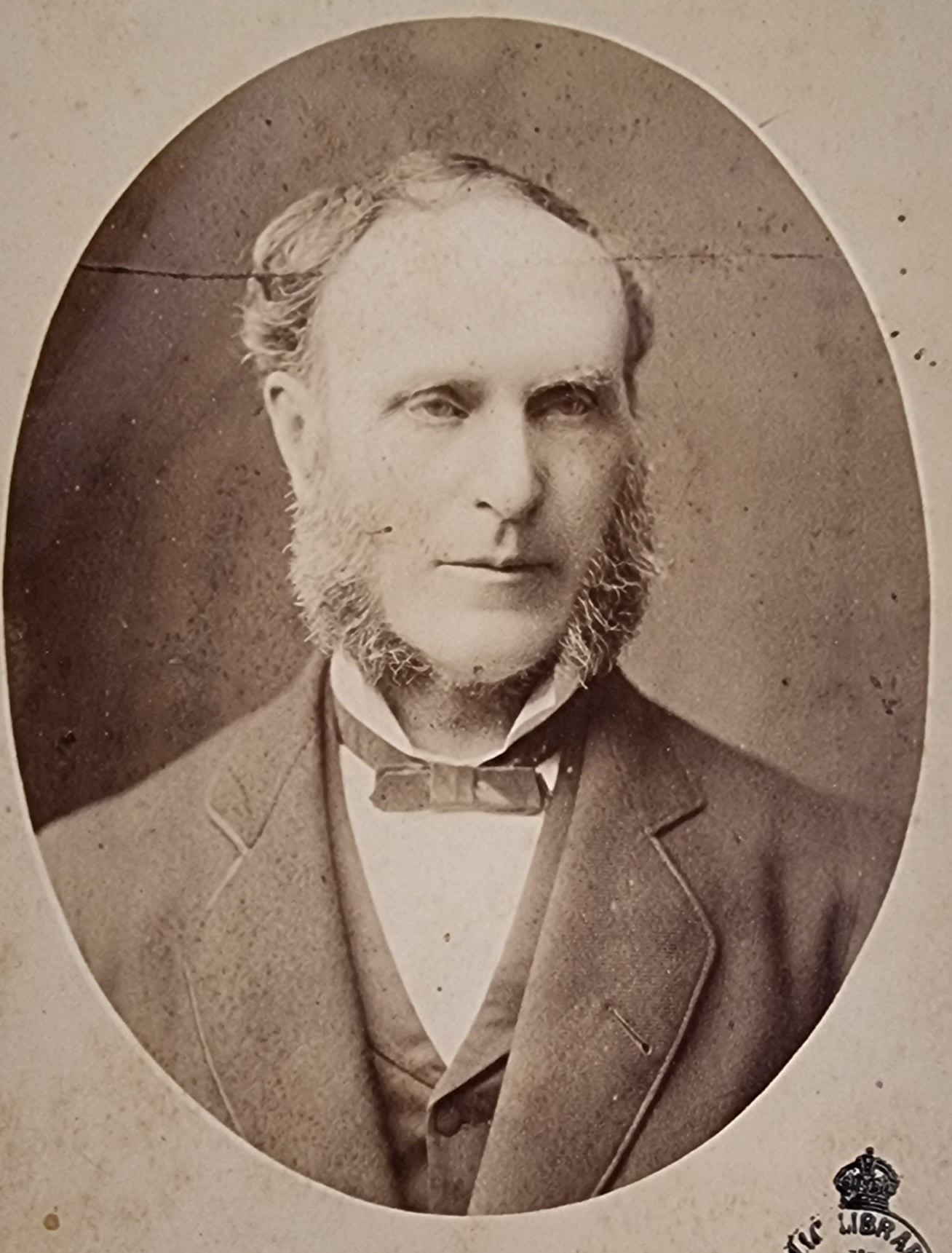
- Professor John Smith, Sydney, c.1885
- Born: 12 December 1821; Peterculter, Aberdeen, Scotland
- Died: 12 October 1885 (aged 63); Australia
- Burial place: Waverley Cemetery
- In office 3 November 1874 – 12 October 1885

John Smith CMG (12 December 1821 – 12 October 1885) was a professor of chemistry and experimental physics at the University of Sydney, and a member of the New South Wales Legislative Council.

== Background ==
Smith was born in Peterculter, Aberdeenshire, Scotland, educated at the University of Aberdeen, where he graduated M.A. and M.D. For five years he taught chemistry at Marischal College, and in 1852, when the University of Sydney was constituted, he was selected to be the first Professor of Chemistry and Experimental Physics, a position which he held for over thirty years. In 1853 he was appointed a member of the Board of National Education, and served till it was dissolved by the Public Schools Act of 1866, when he became a member of the Council of Education constituted thereunder, and was for a number of years president. In 1867 he was appointed to a commission investigating the water supply for Sydney.

On 3 November 1874 Smith was nominated to the Legislative Council, and strongly advocated the adoption of a protectionist policy. In 1876 the University of Aberdeen conferred on him the honorary degree of LL.D., and in 1877 he was created C.M.G. in recognition of his services in the cause of education. In May 1883 the New South Wales Government appointed him a member of the Board of Technical Education, which was abolished in 1890. He died on 12 October 1885. Smith was elected trustee of the Australian Museum; vice-president of the Young Men's Christian Association and honorary treasurer of Sydney Infirmary and Dispensary from 1866 until 1867.
