= William Alderson =

Australian politician

William Maddison Alderson (7 May 1814 – 21 April 1884) was an English-born Australian politician.

He was born in Newcastle upon Tyne to William Henry Alderson and Barbara Maddison. He worked in the leather trade, and in 1835 married Isabel Milford, with whom he had thirteen children. He migrated to New South Wales in 1842, establishing a tannery. He expanded his holdings to include another tannery in Brisbane as well as boot and harness works and a fellmongering works. He was known as a prominent protectionist and an opponent of trade unions. In December 1881, he was appointed to the New South Wales Legislative Council but he never took his seat and resigned in August 1882. He was re-appointed later in that month and served until his death at Darlinghurst in 1884.
