= Henry Kater (politician) =

Australian politician

Henry Edward Kater (20 September 1841 – 23 September 1924) was an Australian politician.

He was born at Bungarabee near Penrith to pastoralist Henry Herman Kater, later a miller and cloth manufacturer, and Eliza Charlotte Darvall. He worked as a junior clerk in Mudgee before acquiring land on the Castlereagh River in 1863, which he then sold. He worked at Wellington as a flour miller. In 1870 married Mary Eliza Forster, daughter of Premier William Forster, with whom he had one son, Norman. In 1879 he settled in Moss Vale, where he became a businessman and pastoralist. In 1888 he was elected to the Council of the Municipal District of Moss Vale.

He was nominated to the New South Wales Legislative Council in 1889 by Premier George Dibbs, but he did not profess loyalty to either the Protectionist or Free Trade parties and was regarded as an independent. Kater remained in the Council until his death in 1924.

His son Norman also served on the Legislative Council.
