= Alexander Gordon (Australian politician) =

English-born Australian politician

Alexander Gordon QC (1815 – 12 December 1903) was an English-born Australian politician.

He was born in London to solicitor Alexander Gordon. He became a London barrister in 1841, focusing on equity law. He married Annie Chambers. He was also a Queen's Counsel, and from 1862 was chancellor of the Sydney Diocese. In 1883 he was appointed to the New South Wales Legislative Council, but he retired to England in late 1885 and his seat was vacated in August 1886. Gordon died at Pucklechurch in Gloucestershire in 1903.

- A daughter Harriet Eliza Gordon (1853–1910) married Rev. Stephen Henry Childe (1844–1923) on 22 November 1886. Their son Vere Gordon Childe was an eminent archaeologist.
- A son Alexander Gordon, later Sir Alexander, was a Supreme Court judge.
