= John Campbell (Australian politician) =

Australian politician (1802–1886)

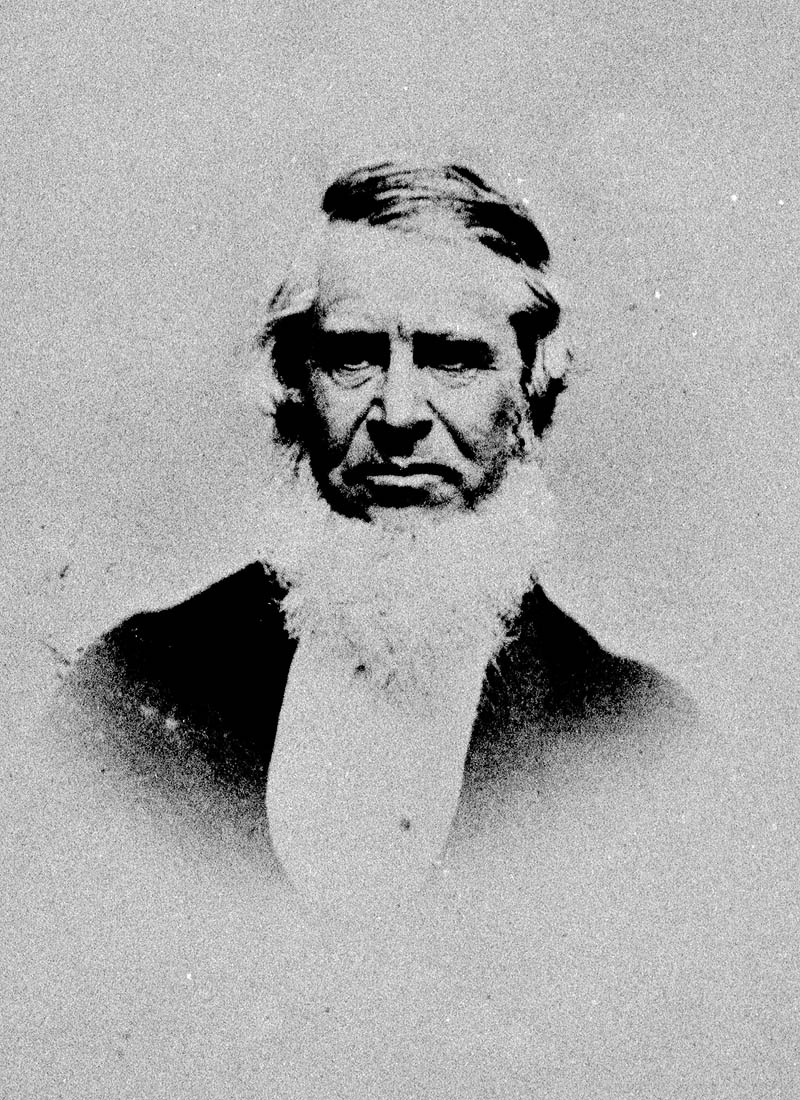

Personal details
- Born: 25 July 1802 Sydney
- Died: 22 January 1886 (aged 83) Stanmore, New South Wales

John Campbell (25 July 1802 – 22 January 1886) was an Australian politician. He was a member of the New South Wales Legislative Council in 1856 and between 1861 and 1886. He was also a member of the New South Wales Legislative Assembly between 1856 and 1860.

== Early life ==
Campbell was the eldest son of Sophia Palmer and Robert Campbell a pioneer Sydney merchant and member of the Legislative Council. He was also the elder brother of Robert Campbell Jr who, at various times, was a member of the Legislative Council and Assembly and Colonial Treasurer. In addition, his youngest brother Charles was a member of the Legislative Council, and his nephew William was a member of the Legislative Council and Assembly between 1868 and 1906. Campbell was educated in England between 1810 and 1820 and joined his father's business after returning to Australia. He became the sole owner of the business in 1859 and was a noted philanthropist who donated much of his fortune to the Anglican Church of Australia. He was the founder of the Anglican Diocese of Riverina.

== Colonial Parliament ==
Campbell was appointed to the first New South Wales Legislative Council which was convened after the establishment of responsible self-government in 1856. However he resigned after 17 days to unsuccessfully contest a ministerial by-election for the seat of Sydney Hamlets. He was defeated by the premier, Stuart Donaldson but Donaldson again resigned from the seat when he accepted a position in the government of Henry Parker in October 1856. Campbell defeated Donaldson at the subsequent by-election and was re-elected at the 1858 colonial election. He transferred to the seat of Glebe at the 1859 election but resigned from the Assembly to concentrate on the family business prior to the election in 1860. He subsequently received a life appointment to the Legislative Council.

New South Wales Legislative Assembly
Preceded by Stuart Donaldson	Member for Sydney Hamlets; 1856 – 1859; Served alongside: Cooper	Succeeded by Seat Abolished
Preceded by New Seat	Member for Glebe; 1859 – 1860	Succeeded by Thomas Smart
