= Charles Campbell (New South Wales politician) =

Australian politician (1810–1888)

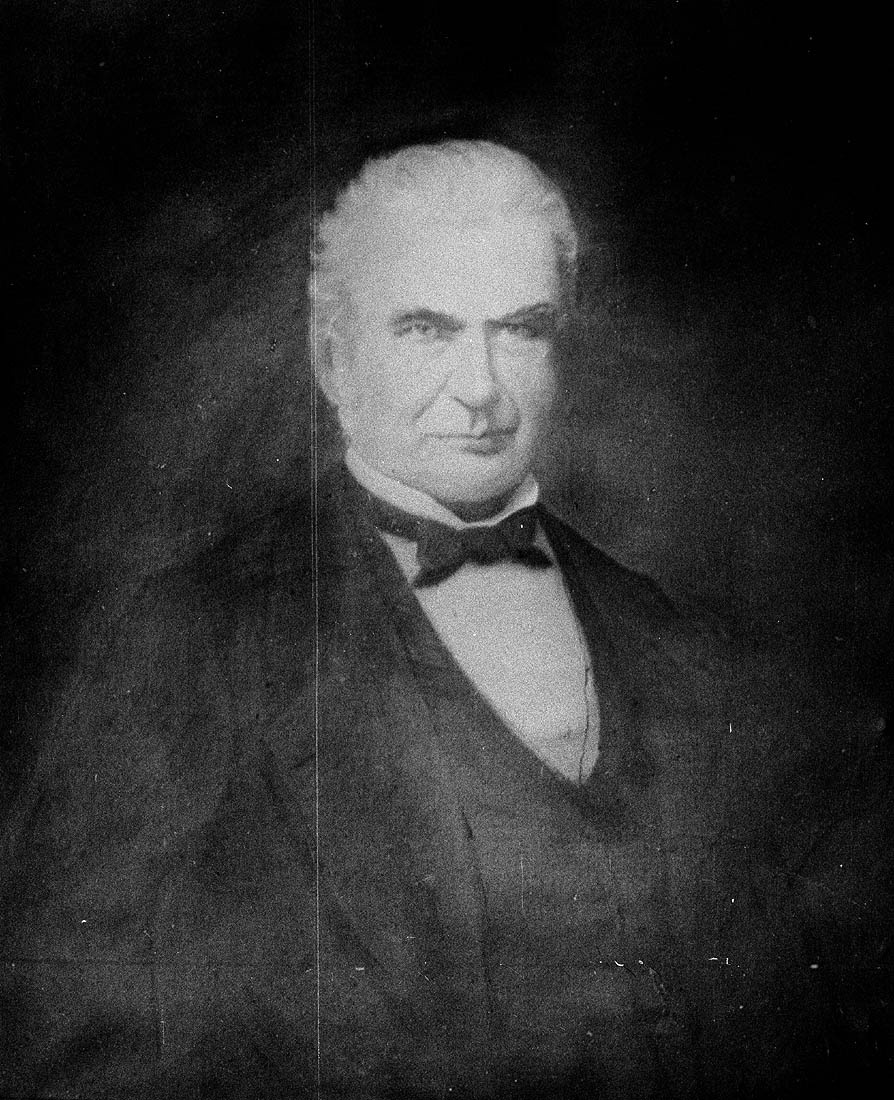

Charles Campbell (20 September 1810 – 23 October 1888) was an Australian barrister, pastoralist and politician.

He was born at sea to merchant Robert Campbell and Sophia Palmer. He received an extensive private education and, after a European tour from 1829 to 1835, purchased land and became a pastoralist. He managed Duntroon for his father and Ginninderra for his cousin George Thomas Palmer. In 1837 he married Palmer's daughter Catherine Irene, and purchased Ginninderra, paying a deposit. They would have five children. Following the drought of 1837–1839 Campbell was unable to continue paying installments Ginninderra and his father-in-law foreclosed on the property and took over.

Campbell and his family moved to Duntroon. He went to England in 1854 and was called to the bar, subsequently serving as a barrister in New South Wales.

Campbell's family were active in NSW politics, his father was a member of the Legislative Council, while his brothers John, and Robert, and nephew William, were at various times members of the Legislative Council and Assembly. Campbell was twice unsuccessful in seeking election for the district of Queanbeyan, in 1864 and 1869. He was appointed to the Legislative Council in 1870 and served there until his death.

In 1868 Charles and his brother John were instrumental in having The King's School re-opened after it had been closed for four years.

Charles died at Inverness in Scotland in 1888.
