= Henry Moore (Australian politician) =

English-born Australian politician

Henry Moore (26 September 1815 – 29 June 1888) was an English-born Australian politician. He was born in London to merchant Joseph Moore, and migrated to Sydney with his father around 1818. After his education he worked as a merchant in his father's firm, and after 11 years established his own business. On 20 April 1839 he married Elizabeth Scholes Johnson, with whom he had nine children. He was also a bank director and insurance company agent. In 1868 he was appointed to the New South Wales Legislative Council, where he served until his death at Rose Bay in 1888.
