= Thomas Cadell (politician) =

Australian politician

Thomas Cadell (1831 – 25 June 1896) was an English-born Australian politician.

He was born in Somerset to Thomas Cadell and Elizabeth Boyce. He migrated to New South Wales around 1855 and farmed at West Maitland before becoming an auctioneer. He married Sophia Richabella Doyle on 29 January 1859; they had seven children. He was later a squatter and businessman, and was a director of the Bank of New South Wales. In 1881, he was appointed to the New South Wales Legislative Council, where he served until his resignation in 1886. Cadell died at Elizabeth Bay in 1896.
