= George Bowen Simpson =

Australian politician

Sir George Bowen Simpson QC (22 May 1838 – 7 September 1915) was a politician and judge in New South Wales, a member of the New South Wales Legislative Council.

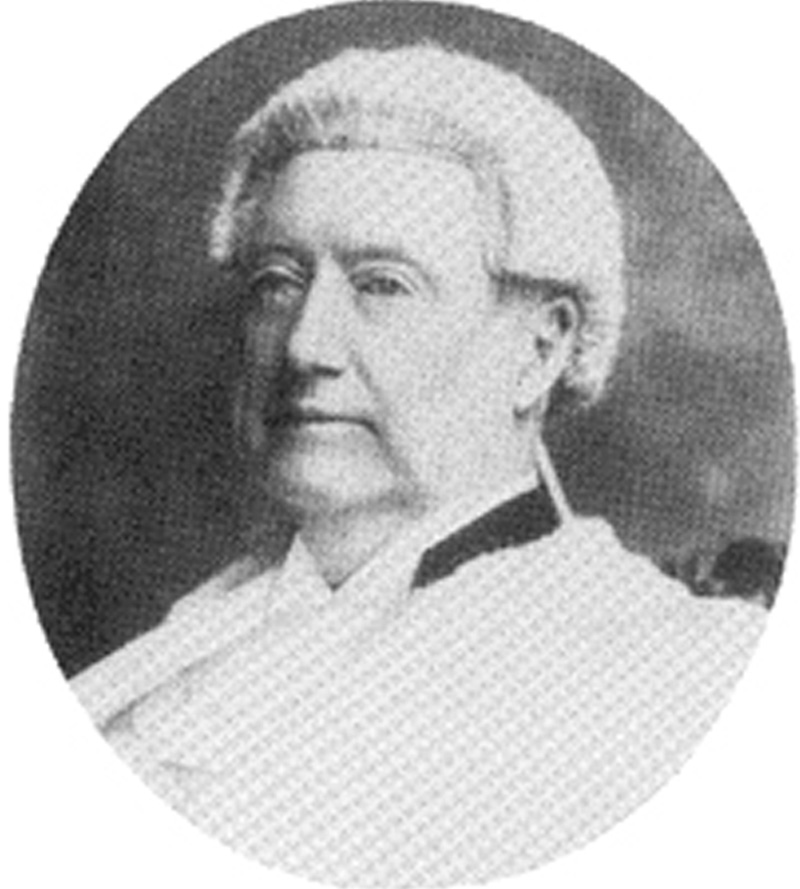
Sir George Bowen Simpson, circa 1900

Simpson was the son of Pierce (Percy) Simpson and his wife, Hester Elizabeth, née MacNeill. Simpson practised at the New South Wales bar, to which he was admitted in November 1858. Simpson lived at Cloncorrick, Darling Point. He was nominated to the Legislative Council in December 1885, and was Attorney-General and Representative of the Government in the Legislative Council in the fifth Robertson ministry from that date till February 1886. He held the same office in the fourth Parkes ministry, from February 1888 to January 1889, when he retired with his colleagues, but was reappointed in March 1889, when Sir Henry Parkes fifth Parkes ministry returned to power. He resigned with his colleagues in October 1891.

Simpson resigned from the Legislative Council as he had been appointed a judge of the New South Wales Supreme Court on 18 December 1894. Simpson was knighted in 1909 and acted as chief justice for a year after Sir Frederick Matthew Darley retired until January 1910 and twice acted as governor.
