= William Halliday (politician) =

Scottish-born Australian pastoralist and politician

- Born: 1828
- Died: 25 August 1892
- Occupation: Politician

William Halliday (1828 – 25 August 1892) was a Scottish-born Australian pastoralist and politician.

He was born at Dumfries to sheep farmer William Halliday and Margaret Harvey. In 1852 he emigrated to Victoria, where he worked on sheep runs in the Wimmera. In 1852 he married Marion Irving, with whom he had five children. He purchased land in New South Wales in 1873, and was active in the Pastoralists Union. In 1885 he was appointed to the New South Wales Legislative Council, serving until his death at Woollahra in 1892.
