= John Watt (politician) =

Australian politician

The Honourable John Brown Watt
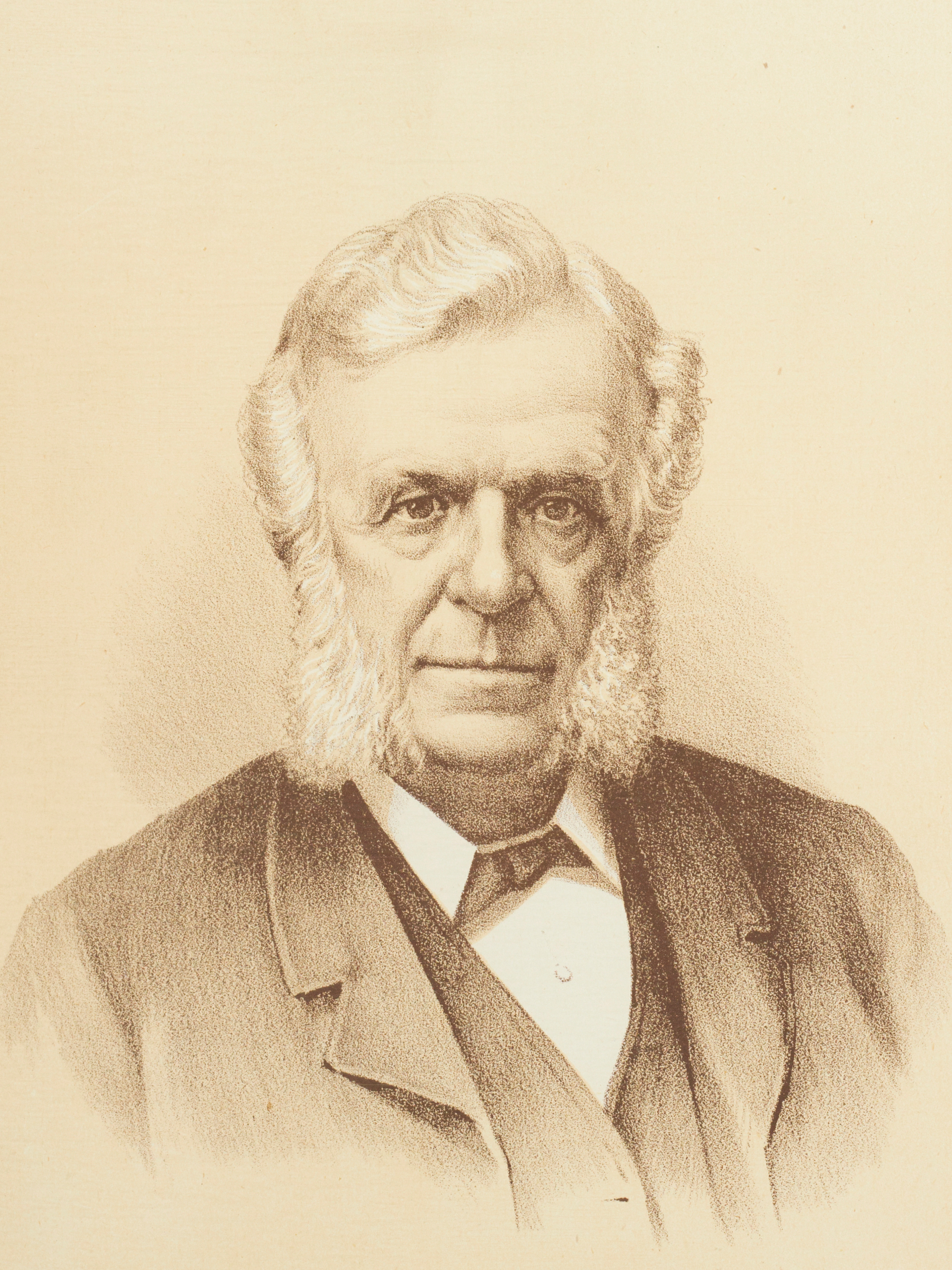

Member of Legislative Council of New South Wales
- In office 11 September 1861 – 20 April 1867
- In office 11 September 1874 – 22 March 1890

Personal details
- Born: 26 May 1826 Edinburgh, Mid-Lothian, Scotland
- Died: 28 September 1897 (aged 71) Sydney, New South Wales, Australia
- Party: Free Trade Party
- Children: Oswald Watt
- Relatives: George Holden (father-in-law); Susan Rankine (née Watt) (granddaughter)
- Education: University of Edinburgh

John Brown Watt, MLC (16 May 1826 – 28 September 1897) was a Scottish-born Australian politician. He served as a member of the New South Wales Legislative Council in Sydney, and he was a board member of the Imperial Federation League in London. He was the founder of the Hospital for Sick Children, Glebe, and a director of the Royal Prince Alfred Hospital, and a director of the Sydney Infirmary and Dispensary, and a director of the Colonial Sugar Refining Company, and a director of the Union Bank of Australia (now the Australia and New Zealand Banking Group Limited).

== Early years ==
Watt was born in Edinburgh, Mid-Lothian, Scotland. He was the eldest son of Alexander Hamilton Watt, a Royal Navy officer, and his wife Margaret (née Gilchrist). Watt graduated from the University of Edinburgh in 1840, and in 1842, he emigrated to Sydney via the Benares.

== Early career ==
Watt was appointed a member of the New South Wales Legislative Council in September 1861, and he resigned on leaving for England in March 1866.

He was reappointed to the New South Wales Legislative Council in October 1874. In 1877, he presented the sum of £1000 to the University of Sydney to found an exhibition for students from primary schools. He presided over the Royal Commission on Military Defences of 1881.

== Later career ==
He was the Commissioner for New South Wales at the International Exhibitions of Philadelphia (1876), Paris (1878), Sydney (1879), Amsterdam (1883) and at Calcutta (1883–84). In 1884, he was invited to the United Kingdom to join the Executive Committee of the Imperial Federation League. In 1890, he forfeited his New South Wales Legislative Council seat due to absence in England.

Watt died in Bournemouth, Dorset on 28 September 1897.

== Family ==
Watt married Mary Jane Holden, daughter of Australian politician George Kenyon Holden; they had five sons and five daughters, including:

- Lieutenant Colonel Walter "Toby" Oswald Watt, OBE, who was a celebrated aviator.
- Ernest Alexander Stuart Watt (born c. 1875 in Sydney) married Annie Elizabeth Caroline Weston on 3 April 1900. They divorced, and on 22 February 1912, Watt married Marie Margeurite Beerbohm, 22-year-old niece of Max Beerbohm. They also divorced, and he married again to 23-year-old Ruth Edmunds Massey on 2 September 1929.

- Susan Gai Watt, AM, daughter of Ernest and Ruth, married Commander Sir Laurence Whistler Street. She was the first female chair of the Eastern Sydney Health Service (later amalgamated with Illawarra).
