= George Cox (New South Wales politician) =

Australian politician

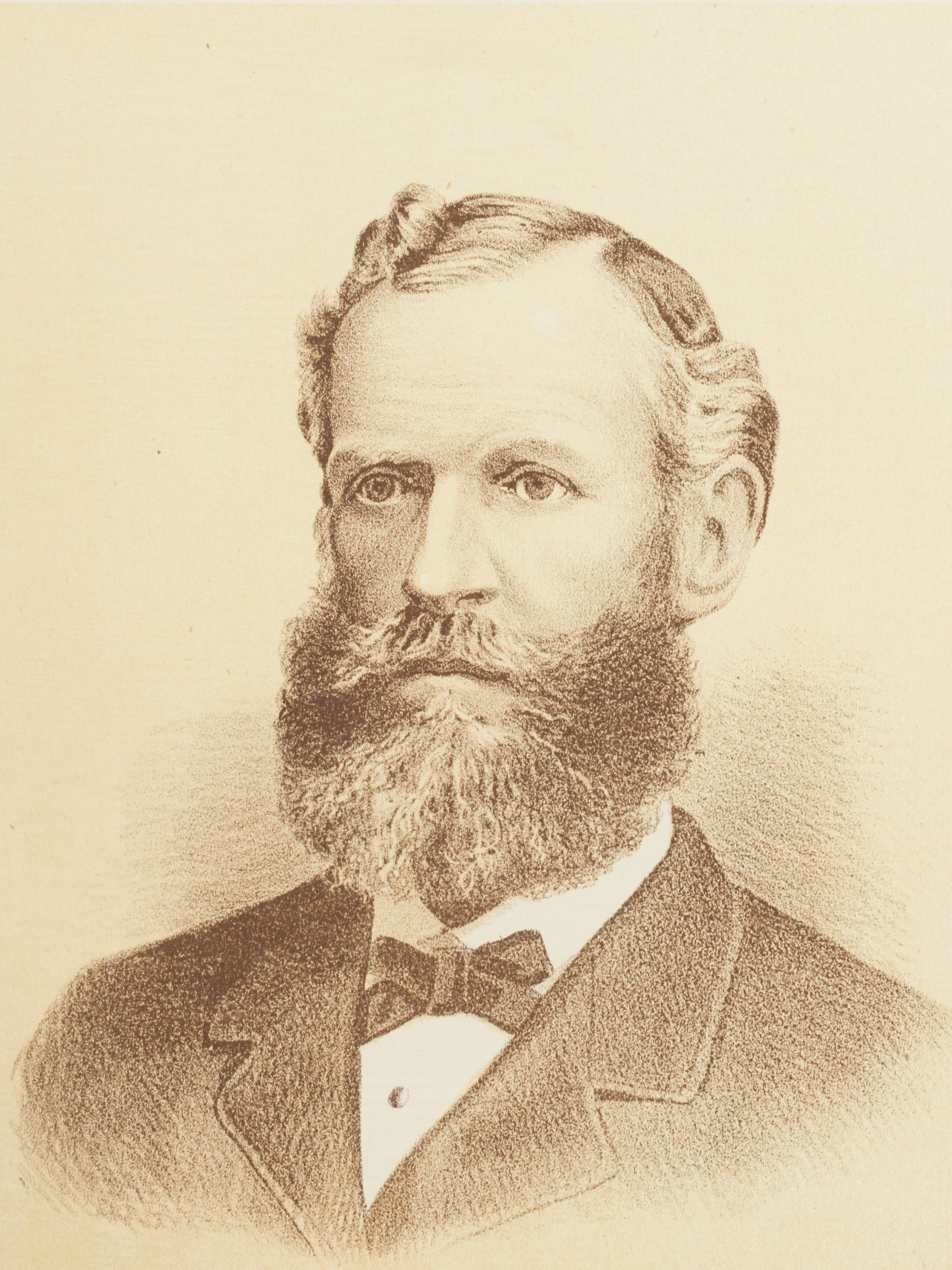

Personal details
- Born: George Henry Cox; 18 October 1824 Mulgoa, New South Wales, Australia
- Died: 21 November 1901 (aged 77) Mudgee, New South Wales, Australia
- Party: Free Trade Party

George Henry Cox (18 October 1824 – 21 November 1901) was an Australian politician. He was a member of the New South Wales Legislative Council between 1863 and 1901. He was also a member of the New South Wales Legislative Assembly between 1856 and 1859.

== Early life ==
Cox was the eldest son of George Cox a pioneer Sydney pastoralist and a grandson of William Cox who constructed the first road across the Blue Mountains. He was the nephew of Edward Cox, a member of the first Legislative Council and a cousin of Edward King Cox and Archibald Bell who also served in the New South Wales Parliament. Cox was educated at The King's School, Parramatta and developed extensive pastoral interests in Dubbo, Mudgee, the Warrego River District and the Liverpool Plains.

He was prominent in the synod of the Anglican Church of Australia, active in local Government in the Mudgee district and a foundation member of the Royal Agricultural Society of New South Wales.

== Colonial Parliament ==
Cox was elected as the representative for the seat of Wellington (County) in the first Legislative Assembly convened after the granting of responsible self-government in 1856. He was subsequently re-elected unopposed at the 1858 colonial election, but did not contest the 1859 election when the seat of Wellington (County) was abolished. He received a life appointment to the Legislative Council in 1863 and became an active supporter of the Free Trade Party.

== Business career ==
As well as his pastoral interests, Cox was the chairman of Pastoral Finance Association, Limited, from its incorporation in 1890 until his death. It operated a large wool store, freezing works and cold store at Kirribilli.

New South Wales Legislative Assembly
Preceded by First Election	Member for Wellington (County); 1856 – 1859	Succeeded by Seat Abolished
