= George Lee (Australian politician) =

Australian politician

George Lee (16 December 1834 – 23 January 1912) was an Australian politician.

== Life ==
Lee was born at Kelso near Bathurst to pastoralist William Lee and Mary Dargin. He attended schools in Bathurst, Newtown and Sydney before managing his father's lands. In 1860 he married Emily Louisa Kite. He inherited his father's estate in 1870, with property at Kelso and Condobolin. He bred merino sheep, shorthorn cattle and racehorses, and was closely involved in the local agricultural community. In 1882 he was appointed to the New South Wales Legislative Council, where he became known as a Free Trader. He remained in the council until his death at Kelso in 1912.
