= James Norton Jr. =

Australian politician

James Norton Jr. (5 December 1824 – 18 July 1906) was a solicitor and member of the New South Wales Legislative Council.

Norton was born in Sydney, New South Wales, Australia, the eldest son of James Norton, also a member of the Legislative Council and solicitor in large practice in Sydney, by his first wife, Jane, daughter of Alexander Kenneth Mackenzie.

Norton was appointed to the New South Wales Legislative Council in October 1879, and was Postmaster-General in the Stuart ministry from May 1884 to October 1885. He served in the council until his death in 1906.

Norton practised as a solicitor in Sydney, being a Fellow of St Paul's College within the University of Sydney and a trustee of the Free Public Library and Australian Museum. He married first, at Longford, Tasmania, in June 1854, Harriott Mary, eldest daughter of Thomas Walker, Deputy Assistant Commissary-General of New South Wales (who died in 1860); and, secondly, at Sydney, in December 1862, Isabella, eldest daughter of Rev. William Stephens, of Levens, Westmoreland.

Norton was a member of the Royal Society of New South Wales from 1873, and was a founder of Linnean Society of New South Wales in 1875, president in 1899 and 1900, and the orchid Adenochilus nortonii was named in his honour.

Parliament of New South Wales
Political offices
Preceded by William Trickett	Postmaster-General; 1883 – 1884	Succeeded by John See
