= William Byrnes =

Australian politician

William Byrnes (2 June 1809 – 25 October 1891) was an Australian politician.

He was born in Parramatta to James and Frances Byrnes; his father was a member of the New South Wales Corps. He was an apprentice saddler before pioneering steam ferries on the Parramatta River with his brother James. On 6 December 1834 he married Ann Oakes, daughter of MLC Francis Oakes and they had fourteen children.

In the 1840s the brothers ran a flour mill, and they continued to run mills and stores thereafter. Byrnes was a member of the New South Wales Legislative Council from August 1858 to May 1861 and from September 1861 until his death at Parramatta in October 1891.

His brother James was a member of the NSW Parliament at various times between 1850 and 1872. His nephew, Charles, James' youngest son was also a member of the Legislative Assembly between 1874 and 1882.
