= John Eales (Australian politician) =

Australian politician

Assembly Member for New South Wales Legislative Council
- In office 15 December 1880 – 30 April 1894

Personal details
- Born: 1 February 1831 Berry Park, Hunter River, New South Wales, Australia
- Died: 30 April 1894 (aged 63) Duckenfield, Hunter River, New South Wales, Australia
- Spouse: Ann Maria Gain
- Children: 6 sons
- Occupation: Landlord and racehorse breeder

John Eales (1 February 1831 – 30 April 1894) was an Australian politician.

He was born at Berry Park on the Hunter River to landowners John and Jane Eales. He was educated in Sydney and managed his father's estate, which he then inherited. On 23 February 1861 he married Ann Maria Gain, with whom he had six sons. In 1880 he was appointed to the New South Wales Legislative Council, where he served until his death at his Duckenfield estate in 1894.

He earned his income from breeding racehorses and other stock and taking on tenant farmers. He was a parishioner of the Church of England.

In 1880s, Eales owned Morpeth House and was the first European settler in Duckenfield.

According to Harry Boyle's Historic Largs Village, John Eales offered to take the Midlothian immigrants, but they refused and decided to settle on Goulburn Grove.
