= Philip King (Australian politician) =

Australian politician (1817–1904)

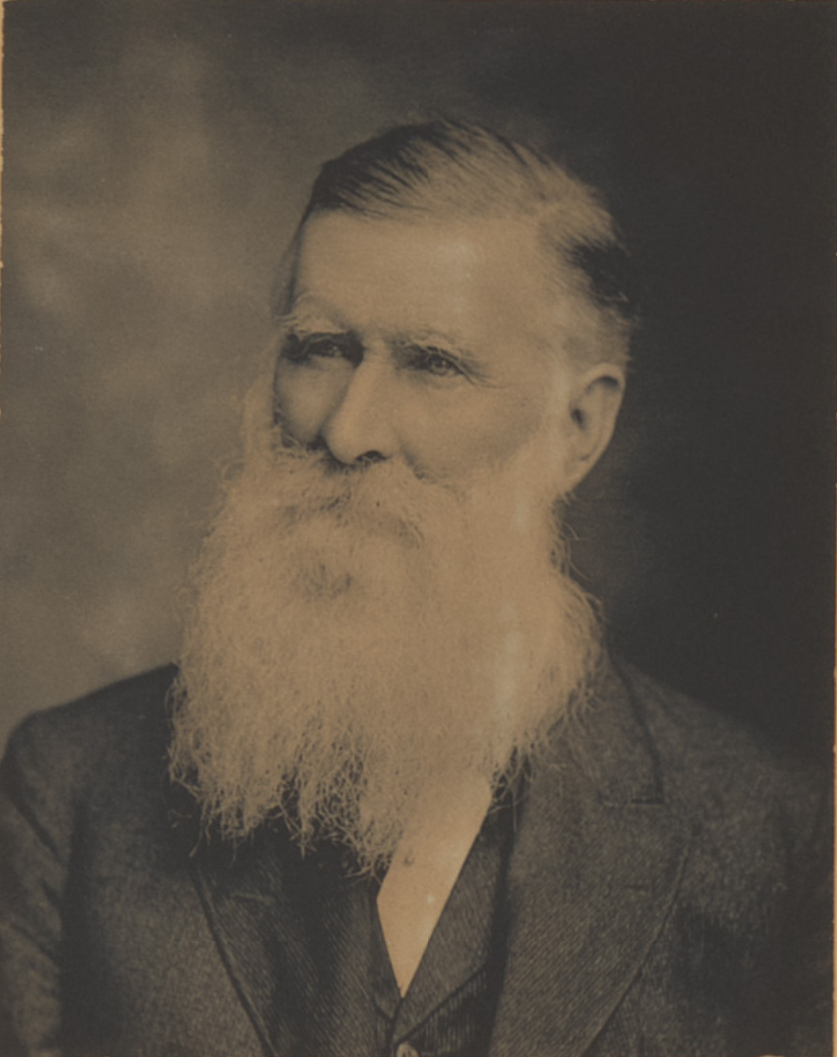
- King in c. 1898
- Born: 31 October 1817; Parramatta, New South Wales
- Died: 5 August 1904 (aged 86); Double Bay, New South Wales
- Occupation: Pastoralist
- Years active: 1831–1904
- Known for: The Voyage of the Beagle, Australian Agricultural Company, Australian politics

Philip Gidley King (31 October 1817 – 5 August 1904) was a pastoralist and politician from the colony of New South Wales. He served as a member of New South Wales Legislative Council from 1880 until his death in 1904. In 1843 at St John's Church, Parramatta, he married Elizabeth (d.1899), daughter of Hannibal Macarthur.

== Early life ==
Philip Gidley King was born on 31 October 1817 at Parramatta to Phillip Parker King and Harriet Lethbridge; his grandfather, Philip Gidley King, was Governor of New South Wales from 1800 to 1806. He was educated at Deptford in England from 1824 to 1825, and at the age of nine sailed with his father on the ship HMS Adventure surveying the coast of South America.

In December 1831, he sailed as midshipman on HMS Beagle where he befriended Charles Darwin who he remained in contact with over the course of his lifetime. In January 1836, he returned to Parramatta, and subsequently he worked on pastoral stations on the Murrumbidgee River and around Port Phillip. In 1842 he took charge of horse and cattle studs at Stroud for the Australian Agricultural Company. He married Elizabeth Macarthur in 1843; they had four children. From 1854, King managed a property near Tamworth.

== Politics ==
King was the inaugural mayor of the town of Tamworth from 1876 to 1880. In 1880 he was appointed by Sir Henry Parkes, the Premier, to the New South Wales Legislative Council, where he was generally associated with the Free Trade Party.

== Later life ==
In 1892, at the request of the publisher John Murray, King was asked for recollections as a possible supplement to the new illustrated edition of Darwin's The Voyage of the Beagle. These reminiscences are now held at the State Library of New South Wales along with an unpublished autobiography written in 1894. King died at Double Bay in Sydney on 5 August 1904.

Trustee of Australian Museum 1881 - 1904. Member of Aborigines Protection Board 1883 - 1904. Married Elizabeth Macarthur in 1843 and had, 1 daughter and 3 sons. In the 1880s he was the director of the Mercantile Bank of Sydney that became part of the Bank of New South Wales.
