= Jeremiah Rundle =

Australian politician

Jeremiah Brice Rundle (1 January 1816 – 6 March 1893) was an English-born Australian politician. He was born in Cornwall to farmer Jeremiah Brice Rundle and Elizabeth White. He emigrated to Australia around 1835 and settled at Murrurundi, where he ran a store. In the 1840s, he earned income by boiling down stock for tallow and foreclosing mortgages. He was eventually a partner in a mercantile firm, which ran until 1859. He set up with Richard Carey Danger a merchant and commission agency called Rundle, Dangar & Co. in Sydney and Dangar & Co. in London. On 18 March 1848 he married Mary Simond, with whom he had eleven children. In the 1850s owned land with the Dangar family owned 600,000 acres of land in Walcha He remained a prominent businessman in the colony, and also owned extensive land in the Liverpool Plains, as well as the Warrego and Darling Downs districts in Queensland. In September 1860 he wrote a letter to the colonial sectary wanting to produce a bill that addresses cattle stealing. In November 1860 he was appointed to the general committee of the New South Wales Constitutional Association He was the director and chairman of the Australian Joint Bank From 1870 - 1893 he was the director of the Sydney Meat Preserving Co, the Morouya Silver Mining Co, and the United Fire and Marine Insurance Co. He also served as magistrate for the City of Sydney, a trustee of the Victoria Club and an early member of the Royal Sydney Yacht Squadron. In 1882 he was appointed to the New South Wales Legislative Council, where he served until his death at Potts Point in 1893.
