= Edward Knox (Australian politician) =

Australian politician (1819–1901)

Sir Edward Knox
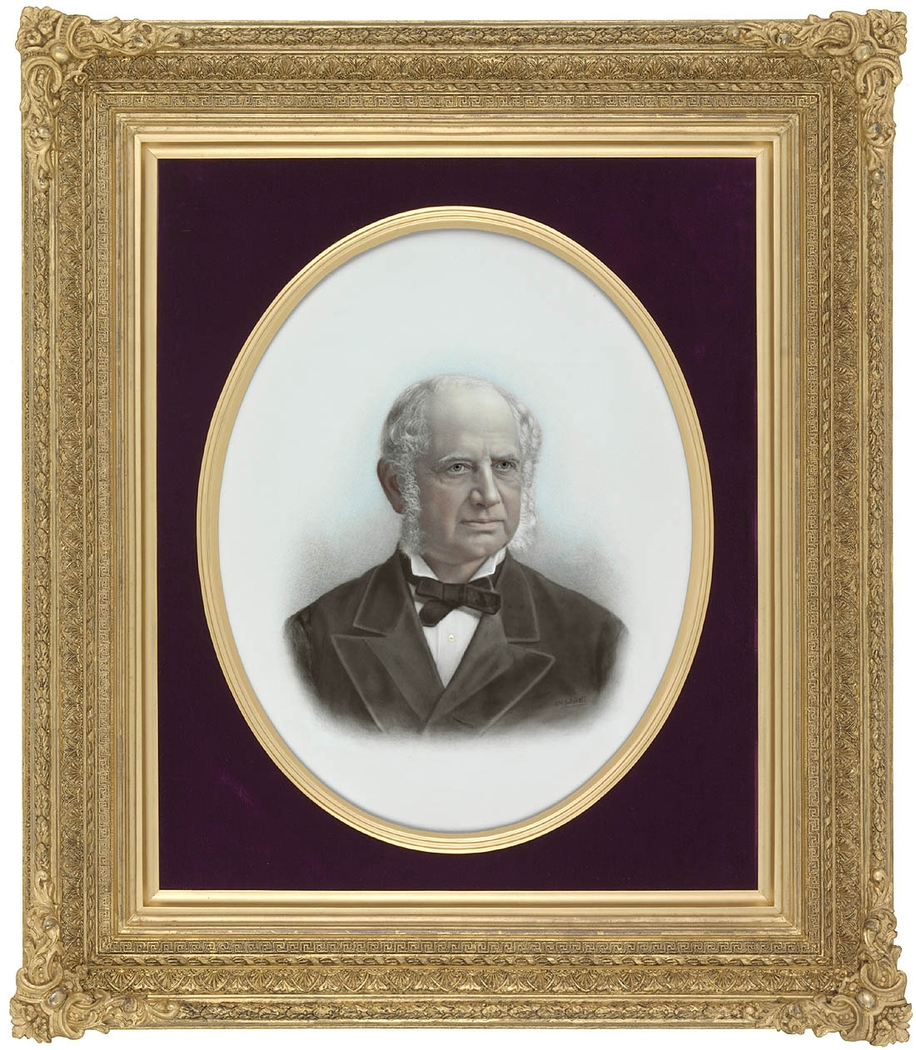
- Born: 6 June 1819; Helsingor, Denmark
- Died: 7 January 1901 (aged 81); Woollahra, NSW
- Resting place: Waverley Cemetery
- Occupations: Politician, sugar-refiner and banker
- Known for: Founder and Chairman, Colonial Sugar Refining Company (CSR)
- Office: Inaugural, Legislative Council of New South Wales, 1856-7
- Board member of: Chairman, Commercial Banking Company of Sydney; Director, Benevolent Society; Founding Director and Chairman. Royal Prince Alfred Hospital; President and Founding Member, Union Club
- Children: 4 sons and 4 four daughters
- Parent(s): George Knox and Elizabeth Frances, nee Mullens
- Honours: Knighted 1898

Sir Edward Knox (6 June 1819 – 7 January 1901) was a Danish-born Australian politician, sugar refiner and banker.

== Early life ==
He was born in Helsingør, Denmark, to merchant George Knox and Elizabeth Frances, née Mullens. His father was from Scotland. His mother was born in Bordeaux. He received his schooling at Sorø Academy. He became a merchant at 16, training in Lübeck, Germany, before entering his uncle's London merchant house as a clerk. He then migrated to Sydney in 1840 deciding on a new life as a pastoralist.

== Career in business ==
He was employed by the Australian Auction Company and in 1843 rose to the position of manager before transferring to the Australasian Sugar Company. He was eventually a partner in a sugar distillery, which he leased to his employers. In 1855 he founded the Colonial Sugar Refining Company, of which he was the first chairman of directors, a position he held until 1901. Knox expanded his interests establishing refineries and mills throughout Australia, New Zealand and later Fiji. He handed over the management of the company to his son Edward William but stayed on as chairman until 1901. He was a respected employer displaying an interest in his employees by establishing one of the first staff provident funds.

Knox had other business interests notably in banking and commerce. A director of the Commercial Banking Company of Sydney between 1845 and 1901, he became manager in July 1847. He then became a director of the Sydney Tramway and Railway Company, and helped establish the Sydney Chamber of Commerce.

== Career in politics ==
Knox was appointed to the first New South Wales Legislative Council in 1856–57. He later resigned due to his absence from the colony and founded the Victoria Sugar Company. He served again in the Legislative Council from 1882 to 1894 during which time he was active in opposing Sir Alfred Stephen's divorce bills.

== Personal life ==
Knox married Martha Rutledge on 4 June 1844, with whom he had eight children.

- Their second son, Edward William Knox (1 April 1847 – 26 June 1933), was managing director of Colonial Sugar Refining Co., Ltd. 1880–1933.

In 1894 he celebrated his golden wedding anniversary and fifty years with the company with a memorable testimonial hosted by the directors, officers and employees of the Colonial Sugar Refining Company.

Knox was a devout Anglican and active churchman, serving as a member of Synod and countless church committees. His charitable works included the Benevolent Society and Sydney Infirmary and Dispensary of which he acted as director, and he was founding director and chairman of Royal Prince Alfred Hospital. He was knighted in 1898.

Sir Edward Knox died at his residence Fiona in Woollahra on 7 January 1901. Fiona was designed by the architect John Frederick Hilly and is now part of Ascham School in Edgecliff. Knox is buried at Sydney's Waverley Cemetery.

== See also ==
- CSR Limited
