= Postmaster-General of New South Wales =

Former government position in Australia

- Style: The Honourable
- Appointer: Governor of New South Wales
- Precursor: Postmaster of New South Wales
- Formation: 21 October 1835
- First holder: James Raymond
- Final holder: Paddy Crick
- Abolished: 28 January 1901
- Succession: Postmaster General of Australia; Postmaster-General's Department

The Postmaster-General of New South Wales was a position in the government of the colony of New South Wales. This portfolio managed the postal department of the New South Wales Government and was in charge of all postal and communications services in the colony prior to the Federation of Australia, from 1835 to 1901. Upon Federation, Section 51(v) of the Constitution of Australia gave the Commonwealth exclusive power for "postal, telegraphic, telephonic, and other like services".

== History ==
The first Postmaster of New South Wales, Isaac Nichols, was appointed by the military junta following the overthrow of Governor Bligh in the Rum Rebellion. Nichols retained the position when Governor Macquarie arrived in 1810, holding it until his death in 1819. The post office was re-organised in 1835, with postmaster James Raymond being appointed as Postmaster-General, responsible for the various post offices throughout the colony. Raymond's replacement, Francis Merewether was appointed to the Legislative Council. With the establishment of responsible government in 1856, the position reverted to a civil service office. At first the postmaster-general reported to the Colonial Secretary, then the Colonial Treasurer. In September 1865 the Governor declared that a member of the Legislative Assembly was capable of holding the office of Postmaster-General, and James Cunneen was appointed, however his appointment as a minister did not give him a seat in cabinet.

== List of Postmasters-General ==
Title	Name	Party affiliation	Term start	Term end	Time in office	Notes
Postmaster	Isaac Nichols	Not a member of Legislative Council	March 1809	18 November 1819	9–10 years	
Postmaster	George Panton	Not a member of Legislative Council	16 November 1819	24 April 1829	9 years, 159 days	
Postmaster	James Raymond	Not a member of Legislative Council	27 April 1829	20 October 1835	6 years, 176 days	
Postmaster-General	James Raymond	Not a member of Legislative Council	21 October 1835	29 May 1851	15 years, 220 days	
Postmaster-General	Francis Merewether	Appointed position in Legislative Council	9 June 1851	30 April 1852	326 days	
Postmaster-General	William Christie	Appointed position in Legislative Council, until 1856	1 May 1852	1 October 1865	13 years, 153 days	
Postmaster-General	James Cunneen	No party	1 October 1865	21 October 1866	1 year, 20 days	
Postmaster-General	Joseph Docker	No party	22 January 1866	27 September 1868	2 years, 249 days	
Postmaster-General	Atkinson Tighe	No party	29 September 1868	26 October 1868	27 days	
Postmaster-General	Daniel Egan	No party	27 October 1868	16 October 1870	1 year, 354 days	
Postmaster-General	Joseph Docker	No party	16 December 1870	13 May 1872	1 year, 149 days	
Postmaster-General	George Lloyd	No party	14 May 1872	4 December 1872	204 days	
Postmaster-General	Saul Samuel	No party	5 December 1872	8 February 1875	2 years, 65 days	
Postmaster-General	John Burns	No party	9 February 1875	21 March 1877	2 years, 40 days	
Postmaster-General	Saul Samuel	No party	22 March 1877	16 August 1877	147 days	
Postmaster-General	John Davies	No party	17 August 1877	17 December 1877	122 days	
Postmaster-General	John Burns	No party	18 December 1877	20 December 1878	1 year, 2 days	
Postmaster-General	Saul Samuel	No party	21 December 1878	10 August 1880	1 year, 233 days	
Postmaster-General	Francis Suttor	No party	11 August 1881	13 November 1881	94 days	
Postmaster-General	Stephen Brown	No party	14 November 1881	22 August 1882	281 days	
Postmaster-General	Alexander Campbell	No party	30 August 1882	4 January 1883	127 days	
Postmaster-General	Francis Wright	No party	5 January 1883	27 May 1883	142 days	
Postmaster-General	William Trickett	No party	28 May 1883	1 May 1884	339 days	
Postmaster-General	James Norton	No party	2 May 1884	6 October 1885	1 year, 157 days	
Postmaster-General	John See	No party	7 October 1885	21 December 1885	75 days	
Postmaster-General	Daniel O'Connor	No party	22 December 1885	25 February 1886	65 days	
Postmaster-General	Francis Wright	No party	26 February 1886	19 January 1887	327 days	
Postmaster-General	Charles Roberts	Free Trade	20 January 1887	16 January 1889	1 year, 362 days	
Postmaster-General	Henry Clarke	Protectionist	17 January 1889	7 March 1889	49 days	
Postmaster-General	Daniel O'Connor	Free Trade	8 March 1889	22 October 1891	2 years, 228 days	
Postmaster-General	John Kidd	Protectionist	27 October 1891	2 August 1894	2 years, 279 days	
Postmaster-General	Joseph Cook	Free Trade	3 August 1894	27 August 1898	4 years, 24 days	
Postmaster-General	Varney Parkes	Free Trade	27 August 1898	13 September 1899	1 year, 17 days	
Postmaster-General	Paddy Crick	Protectionist	14 September 1899	28 February 1901	1 year, 167 days	
