= Electoral results for the district of New England =

Election results for New England, New South Wales, Australia

New England, an electoral district of the Legislative Assembly in the Australian state of New South Wales, was created in 1859 and abolished in 1894.

Single-member (1859–1880)
Election	Member	Party				
1859	James Hart	None				
1860	George Markham	None				
1862 by	Robert Forster	None				
1864	Theophilus Cooper	None				
1869	Charles Weaver	None				
1871 by	Samuel Terry	None				
1874	Samuel Terry	None				
1877	Samuel Terry	None				
Two members (1880–1891)
Election	Member	Party	Member	Party		
1880	Henry Copeland	None	William Proctor	None		
1882	James Farnell	None	William Proctor	None		
1885	James Inglis	None	William Proctor	None		
1887 by	James Inglis	None	William Proctor	None		
1887	James Inglis	Free Trade	Henry Copeland	Protectionist		
1889	James Inglis	Free Trade	Henry Copeland	Protectionist		
Three members (1891–1894)
Election	Member	Party	Member	Party	Member	Party
1891	James Inglis	Free Trade	Henry Copeland	Protectionist	Edmund Lonsdale	Free Trade

== Election results ==
=== Elections in the 1890s ===
==== 1891 ====
1891 New South Wales colonial election: New England Thursday 25 June
Party	Candidate	Votes	%	±%
Free Trade	James Inglis (re-elected 1)	1,731	19.5	
Protectionist	Henry Copeland (re-elected 2)	1,563	17.6	
Free Trade	Edmund Lonsdale (elected 3)	1,544	17.4	
Protectionist	Charles Wilson	1,399	15.7	
Free Trade	George Meallin	1,353	15.2	
Protectionist	William Proctor	1,311	14.7	
Total formal votes		8,901	99.5	
Informal votes		42	0.5	
Turnout		3,247	60.8	
Free Trade hold 1, win 1		(1 new seat)		
Protectionist hold 1		(1 new seat)		

=== Elections in the 1880s ===
==== 1889 ====
1889 New South Wales colonial election: New England Monday 4 February
Party	Candidate	Votes	%	±%
Protectionist	Henry Copeland (elected 1)	1,396	34.9	
Free Trade	James Inglis (elected 2)	1,099	27.4	
Protectionist	William Proctor	1,052	26.3	
Protectionist	Charles Givney	459	11.5	
Total formal votes		4,006	99.2	
Informal votes		31	0.8	
Turnout		3,064	73.6	
Protectionist hold 1				
Free Trade hold 1				

==== 1887 ====
1887 New South Wales colonial election: New England Thursday 10 February
Party	Candidate	Votes	%	±%
Free Trade	James Inglis (re-elected 1)	1,371	46.1	
Protectionist	Henry Copeland (re-elected 2)	999	33.6	
Protectionist	Charles Givney	603	20.3	
Total formal votes		2,973	99.0	
Informal votes		31	1.0	
Turnout		2,108	53.9	

==== 1887 by-election ====
1887 New England by-election Monday 10 January
Candidate	Votes	%
William Proctor (re-elected)	673	45.7
Charles Givney	484	32.8
William Cleghorn	317	21.5
Total formal votes	1,474	100.0
Informal votes	0	0.0
Turnout	1,474	37.7

William Proctor resigned because he was found to have an interest in a government contract.

==== 1885 ====
1885 New South Wales colonial election: New England Saturday 31 October
Candidate	Votes	%
James Inglis (elected 1)	1,233	35.6
William Proctor (re-elected 2)	1,191	34.4
William Drew	580	16.7
William Dowel	285	8.2
Charles Givney	177	5.1
Total formal votes	3,466	98.8
Informal votes	41	1.2
Turnout	2,024	55.7

The sitting member James Farnell was appointed to the Legislative Council and did not contest the election.

==== 1882 ====
1882 New South Wales colonial election: New England Saturday 16 December
Candidate	Votes	%
William Proctor (re-elected 1)	980	33.8
James Farnell (elected 2)	968	33.4
Jeremiah O'Connell	951	32.8
Total formal votes	2,899	99.2
Informal votes	24	0.8
Turnout	1,931	49.2

The sitting member Henry Copeland successfully contested Newtown. James Farnell was a sitting member for St Leonards and had already unsuccessfully contested Parramatta.

==== 1880 ====
1880 New South Wales colonial election: New England Thursday 2 December
Candidate	Votes	%
William Proctor (elected 1)	962	35.8
Henry Copeland (re-elected 2)	909	33.9
Jeremiah O'Connell	814	30.3
Total formal votes	2,685	99.2
Informal votes	23	0.9
Turnout	1,779	51.9
	(1 new seat)	

The sitting member Samuel Terry successfully contested Mudgee. Henry Copeland was the member for the abolished seat of Goldfields North.

=== Elections in the 1870s ===
==== 1877 ====
1877 New South Wales colonial election: New England Saturday 3 November
Candidate	Votes	%
Samuel Terry (re-elected)	736	58.6
Robert Forster (defeated)	521	41.5
Total formal votes	1,257	96.8
Informal votes	42	3.2
Turnout	1,299	49.2

==== 1874 ====
1874–75 New South Wales colonial election: New England Thursday 7 January 1875
Candidate	Votes	%
Samuel Terry (re-elected)	unopposed	

==== 1872 ====
1872 New South Wales colonial election: New England Friday 8 March
Candidate	Votes	%
Samuel Terry (re-elected)	1,098	84.3
William Windeyer	205	15.7
Total formal votes	1,303	98.6
Informal votes	19	1.4
Turnout	1,322	49.9

==== 1871 by-election ====
1871 New England by-election Monday 28 August
Candidate	Votes	%
Samuel Terry (elected)	578	54.0
Robert Abbott	492	46.0
Total formal votes	1,070	100.0
Informal votes	0	0.00
Turnout	1,070	40.4

Charles Weaver resigned.

=== Elections in the 1860s ===
==== 1869 ====
1869–70 New South Wales colonial election: New England Thursday 23 December 1869
Candidate	Votes	%
Charles Weaver (elected)	759	59.2
Robert Forster	520	40.6
Alexander Black	3	0.2
Total formal votes	1,282	100.0
Informal votes	0	0.0
Turnout	1,319	58.7

==== 1864 ====
1864–65 New South Wales colonial election: New England Saturday 24 December 1864
Candidate	Votes	%
Theophilus Cooper (elected)	559	53.7
Robert Forster (defeated)	482	46.3
Total formal votes	1,041	100.0
Informal votes	0	0.0
Turnout	1,041	60.8

==== 1862 by-election ====
1862 New England by-election Saturday 28 June
Candidate	Votes	%
Robert Forster (elected)	353	46.7
Thomas Rusden	313	41.5
Alfred Hayles	56	7.4
James Husband	33	4.4
Total formal votes	755	100.0
Informal votes	0	0.0
Turnout	755	47.1

George Markham resigned.

==== 1860 ====
1860 New South Wales colonial election: New England Monday 24 December
Candidate	Votes	%
George Markham (elected)	475	60.7
Thomas Rusden	304	38.9
John Eames	2	0.3
James Hart	1	0.1
Total formal votes	782	98.5
Informal votes	12	1.5
Turnout	794	53.7

=== Elections in the 1850s ===
==== 1859 ====
1859 New South Wales colonial election: New England Thursday 30 June
Candidate	Votes	%
James Hart (re-elected)	313	49.8
Thomas Rusden	311	49.5
James Eames	4	0.6
Total formal votes	628	99.8
Informal votes	2	0.2
Turnout	630	56.0

Four people were charged with impersonating electors and a petition was lodged against the election. The Elections and Qualifications Committee conducted a re-count.

1859 New South Wales colonial election: New England Re-count
Candidate	Votes	%
James Hart (re-elected)	310	50.1
Thomas Rusden	307	49.6
John Eames	2	0.3
Total formal votes	619	99.6
Informal votes	5	0.4
Turnout	624	55.5
