= Electoral results for the district of St Leonards =

Election results for state seat of St Leonards, New South Wales, Australia

St Leonards, an electoral district of the Legislative Assembly in the Australian state of New South Wales was created in 1894 and abolished in 1904.

Single-member (1859–1882)
Member	Party	Term				
1859	Edward Sayers	None				
1860 by	James Farnell	None				
1860	Isaac Shepherd	None				
1864	William Tunks	None				
1869	William Tunks	None				
1872	William Tunks	None				
1874	James Farnell	None				
1877	James Farnell	None				
1880	James Farnell	None	Member	Party		
1882	George Dibbs	None	Bernhardt Holtermann	None		
1885	Henry Parkes	None	Isaac Ives	None		
1887	Henry Parkes	Free Trade	Isaac Ives	Free Trade		
1887 by	Henry Parkes	Free Trade	Isaac Ives	Free Trade	Member	Party
1889	Henry Parkes	Free Trade	Joseph Cullen	Free Trade	John Burns	Free Trade
1891	Henry Parkes	Free Trade	Joseph Cullen	Free Trade	Edward Clark	Labour
1894	Henry Parkes	Free Trade				
1895	Edward Clark	Free Trade				
1898	Edward Clark	Free Trade				
1901	Edward Clark	Liberal Reform				
1904	Thomas Creswell	Liberal Reform				
1907	Edward Clark	Independent				
1910	Arthur Cocks	Liberal Reform				
1913	Arthur Cocks	Liberal Reform				
1917	Arthur Cocks	Nationalist				

== Election results ==
=== Elections in the 1910s ===
==== 1917 ====
1917 New South Wales state election: St Leonards
Party	Candidate	Votes	%	±%
Nationalist	Arthur Cocks	3,992	65.5	+11.4
Labor	Robert Edwards	2,052	33.7	−10.0
Independent	Frederick Clancy	53	0.9	+0.9
Total formal votes		6,097	98.7	+1.6
Informal votes		80	1.3	−1.6
Turnout		6,177	51.4	−11.6
Nationalist hold		Swing	+11.4	

==== 1913 ====
1913 New South Wales state election: St Leonards
Party	Candidate	Votes	%	±%
Liberal Reform	Arthur Cocks	4,042	54.1	
Labor	George Down	3,264	43.7	
Independent	Frederick Meyer	86	1.2	
Independent	Peter Pollack	78	1.0	
Total formal votes		7,470	97.1	
Informal votes		221	2.9	
Turnout		7,691	63.0	
Liberal Reform hold				

==== 1910 ====
1910 New South Wales state election: St Leonards
Party	Candidate	Votes	%	±%
Liberal Reform	Arthur Cocks	3,382	46.0	+15.2
Labour	George Down	2,232	30.4	+21.0
Independent Liberal	Edward Clark (defeated)	1,735	23.6	−13.4
Total formal votes		7,349	99.6	+2.0
Informal votes		29	0.4	−2.0
Turnout		7,378	68.1	−3.8

1910 New South Wales state election: St Leonards - Second Round
Party	Candidate	Votes	%	±%
Liberal Reform	Arthur Cocks	4,443	57.3	+26.5
Labour	George Down	3,317	42.7	+33.3
Total formal votes		7,760	99.7	+2.1
Informal votes		23	0.3	−2.1
Turnout		7,783	71.8	−0.1
Liberal Reform gain from Independent				

=== Elections in the 1900s ===
==== 1907 ====
1907 New South Wales state election: St Leonards
Party	Candidate	Votes	%	±%
Independent	Edward Clark	2,366	37.0	−0.5
Liberal Reform	John Carter	1,972	30.8	−18.9
Independent Liberal	Herbert McIntosh	909	14.2	
Labour	Herbert Milner	600	9.4	−0.9
Independent Liberal	Thomas Creswell (defeated)	549	8.6	
Total formal votes		6,396	97.6	
Informal votes		156	2.4	
Turnout		6,552	71.9	
Independent gain from Liberal Reform		Swing	+9.2	

This was the third and final contest for St Leonards between Edward Clark and Thomas Creswell. Clark, as the selected Liberal Reform candidate defeated Cresswell at the 1901 election. Creswell then defeated Clark to be selected as the Liberal Reform candidate in 1904, before comfortably beating him at the election. Cresswell however lost Liberal preselection for the seat in 1907 to John Carter, with Clark defeating both Cresswell and Carter to regain the seat.

==== 1904 ====
1904 New South Wales state election: St Leonards
Party	Candidate	Votes	%	±%
Liberal Reform	Thomas Creswell	2,164	49.8	
Independent Liberal	Edward Clark	1,630	37.5	
Labour	George Down	445	10.2	
Independent	Fountain Winter	99	2.3	
Independent Liberal	Charles Lloyd	10	0.2	
Independent	David Middleton	1	0.0	
Total formal votes		4,349	99.0	
Informal votes		45	1.0	
Turnout		4,394	55.9	
Liberal Reform hold				

St Leonards lost part of the district to Lane Cove and was expanded to include part of Warringah. The member for St Leonards was Edward Clark (Liberal Reform), who had defeated Thomas Creswell as an independent liberal candidate at the 1901 election. For 1904 Creswell was selected as the official Liberal candidate while Clark ran as an independent liberal candidate.

==== 1901 ====
1901 New South Wales state election: St Leonards
Party	Candidate	Votes	%	±%
Liberal Reform	Edward Clark	1,066	53.7	−11.9
Independent Liberal	Thomas Creswell	801	40.3	
Labour	Peter O'Connell	119	6.0	
Total formal votes		1,986	99.5	+0.4
Informal votes		11	0.6	−0.4
Turnout		1,997	59.3	+1.8
Liberal Reform hold				

=== Elections in the 1890s ===
==== 1898 ====
1898 New South Wales colonial election: St Leonards
Party	Candidate	Votes	%	±%
Free Trade	Edward Clark	1,080	63.5	
National Federal	Fountain Winter	421	24.8	
Independent Federalist	Andrew Eaton	190	11.2	
Independent Federalist	Robert Moodie	9	0.5	
Total formal votes		1,700	99.0	
Informal votes		17	1.0	
Turnout		1,717	57.5	
Free Trade hold				

==== 1895 ====
1895 New South Wales colonial election: St Leonards
Party	Candidate	Votes	%	±%
Free Trade	Edward Clark	996	62.4	
Ind. Free Trade	William Goddard	601	37.6	
Total formal votes		1,597	99.0	
Informal votes		16	1.0	
Turnout		1,613	68.0	
Free Trade hold				

==== 1894 ====
1894 New South Wales colonial election: St Leonards
Party	Candidate	Votes	%	±%
Free Trade	Sir Henry Parkes	1,028	50.8	
Ind. Free Trade	Edward Clark	825	40.8	
Protectionist	Francis Punch	159	7.9	
Ind. Free Trade	William Stoddart	8	0.4	
Ind. Free Trade	James Ford	2	0.1	
Total formal votes		2,022	99.3	
Informal votes		15	0.7	
Turnout		2,037	83.9	
Free Trade win		(previously 3 members)		

==== 1891 ====
1891 New South Wales colonial election: St Leonards Wednesday 17 June
Party	Candidate	Votes	%	±%
Free Trade	Sir Henry Parkes (re-elected 1)	2,510	24.1	
Free Trade	Joseph Cullen (re-elected 2)	2,359	22.6	
Labour	Edward Clark (elected 3)	1,917	18.4	
Free Trade	John Burns (defeated)	1,808	17.3	
Protectionist	Francis Punch	1,345	12.9	
Ind. Free Trade	Jonathan Seaver (defeated)	494	4.7	
Total formal votes		10,433	99.0	
Informal votes		102	1.0	
Turnout		4,532	61.4	
Free Trade hold 2				
Labour gain 1 from Free Trade				

Jonathan Seaver was the member for Gloucester, a staunch free trader who contested St Leonards because of his opposition to the leadership of Sir Henry Parkes.

=== Elections in the 1880s ===
==== 1889 ====
1889 New South Wales colonial election: St Leonards Saturday 2 February
Party	Candidate	Votes	%	±%
Free Trade	Sir Henry Parkes (elected 1)	2,221	27.3	
Free Trade	Joseph Cullen (elected 2)	1,922	23.6	
Free Trade	John Burns (elected 3)	1,575	19.3	
Free Trade	Edward Clark	1,372	16.8	
Protectionist	J Griffin	1,057	13.0	
Total formal votes		8,147	99.1	
Informal votes		78	1.0	
Turnout		3,708	58.4	
Free Trade hold 2 and win 1		(1 new seat)		

==== 1887 by-election ====
1887 St Leonards by-election Monday 24 October
Party	Candidate	Votes	%	±%
Free Trade	Sir Henry Parkes (elected)	unopposed		
Free Trade hold				

Sir Henry Parkes (Free Trade) resigned due to insolvency.

==== 1887 ====
1887 New South Wales colonial election: St Leonards Wednesday 2 February
Party	Candidate	Votes	%	±%
Free Trade	Sir Henry Parkes (re-elected)	unopposed		
Free Trade	Isaac Ives (re-elected)	unopposed		

==== 1885 ====
1885 New South Wales colonial election: St Leonards Friday 16 October
Candidate	Votes	%
Sir Henry Parkes (re-elected 1)	1,506	33.4
Isaac Ives (re-elected 2)	1,149	25.5
George Dibbs (defeated)	1,039	23.0
Edward Clark	819	18.2
Total formal votes	4,513	98.7
Informal votes	60	1.3
Turnout	3,008	70.5

Sir Henry Parkes was the member for Argyle who contested St Leonards to successfully challenge the Premier George Dibbs. Dibbs was returned to Parliament by successfully contesting The Murrumbidgee on Saturday 31 October.

==== 1882 ====
1882 New South Wales colonial election: St Leonards Tuesday 5 December
Candidate	Votes	%
Bernhardt Holtermann (elected 1)	965	30.9
George Dibbs (elected 2)	962	30.8
Cunningham Atchison	713	22.8
Philip Richardson	327	10.5
William Muston	86	2.8
Sir Henry Parkes	70	2.2
Total formal votes	3,123	98.5
Informal votes	49	1.5
Turnout	1,926	62.5
	(1 new seat)	

Sitting member James Farnell unsuccessfully contested Parramatta and subsequently successfully contested New England. After Sir Henry Parkes unsuccessfully contested East Sydney and nominated for both St Leonards and then Tenterfield where he was elected unopposed. Parkes then withdrew from St Leonards.

==== 1880 ====
1880 New South Wales colonial election: St Leonards Monday 22 November
Candidate	Votes	%
James Farnell (re-elected)	869	55.3
Bernard Holtermann	703	44.7
Total formal votes	1,572	96.8
Informal votes	52	3.2
Turnout	1,624	59.8

=== Elections in the 1870s ===
==== 1877 ====
1877 New South Wales colonial election: St Leonards Wednesday 31 October
Candidate	Votes	%
James Farnell (re-elected)	unopposed	

==== 1874 ====
1874–75 New South Wales colonial election: St Leonards Monday 21 December 1874
Candidate	Votes	%
James Farnell (elected)	856	64.0
Bernard Holtermann	471	35.2
James French	7	0.5
Edward Lord	4	0.3
Total formal votes	1,338	100.0
Informal votes	0	0.0
Turnout	1,338	59.8

==== 1872 ====
1872 New South Wales colonial election: St Leonards Wednesday 6 March
Candidate	Votes	%
William Tunks (re-elected)	686	65.8
James Byrnes	342	32.8
W Wardle	9	0.9
James French	5	0.5
Total formal votes	1,042	100.0
Informal votes	0	0.0
Turnout	1,044	49.8

=== Elections in the 1860s ===
==== 1869 ====
1869–70 New South Wales colonial election: St Leonards Monday 20 December 1869
Candidate	Votes	%
William Tunks (re-elected)	752	56.5
William Forster (defeated)	579	43.5
Total formal votes	1,331	100.0
Informal votes	0	0.0
Turnout	1,331	67.0

==== 1864 ====
1864–65 New South Wales colonial election: St Leonards Wednesday 7 December 1864
Candidate	Votes	%
William Tunks (elected)	591	51.8
Edward Sayers	550	48.2
Total formal votes	1,141	100.0
Informal votes	0	0.0
Turnout	1,141	57.2

==== 1860 ====
1860 New South Wales colonial election: St Leonards Wednesday 19 December
Candidate	Votes	%
Isaac Shepherd (elected)	580	68.4
George McIntosh	252	29.7
James Martin	16	1.9
Total formal votes	848	100.0
Informal votes	0	0.0
Turnout	850	46.9

The sitting member James Farnell unsuccessfully contested Goldfields West and then Central Cumberland.

==== 1860 by-election ====
1860 St Leonards by-election Wednesday 2 May
Candidate	Votes	%
James Farnell (elected)	382	52.7
Isaac Shepherd	343	47.3
Total formal votes	725	100.0
Informal votes	0	0.0
Turnout	725	49.1

Edward Sayers resigned.

=== Elections in the 1850s ===
==== 1859 ====
1859 New South Wales colonial election: St Leonards Friday 17 June
Candidate	Votes	%
Edward Sayers (elected)	389	47.3
Isaac Shepherd	319	38.8
James Farnell	115	14.0
Total formal votes	823	100.0
Informal votes	0	0.0
Turnout	823	55.8
