= 1862 New England colonial by-election =

By-election in New South Wales, Australia

A by-election was held for the New South Wales Legislative Assembly electorate of New England on 28 June 1862 because George Markham resigned, to be appointed superintendent for the southern district in the establishment of the Police Force.

== Dates ==
Date	Event
13 February 1862	George Markham resigned.
19 February 1862	Writ of election issued by the Speaker of the Legislative Assembly.
19 March 1862	Nominations at Armidale.
2 April 1862	Polling day between 9 am and 4 pm.
16 April 1862	Return of writ

== Candidates ==
- Alfred Hayles was a one time candidate, a gold miner from Rocky River.
- James Husband was a solicitor in Sydney and this was the only occasion on which he stood for election
- Robert Forster was a solicitor in Armidale.
- Thomas Rusden was a squatter in the Glen Innes region and a former member for Member for New England and Macleay.

== Result ==
1862 New England by-election Saturday 28 June
Candidate	Votes	%
Robert Forster (elected)	353	46.7
Thomas Rusden	313	41.5
Alfred Hayles	56	7.4
James Husband	33	4.4
Total formal votes	755	100.0
Informal votes	0	0.0
Turnout	755	47.1

== See also ==
- Electoral results for the district of New England
- List of New South Wales state by-elections
