= 1860 St Leonards colonial by-election =

By-election in New South Wales, Australia

A by-election was held for the New South Wales Legislative Assembly electorate of St Leonards on 2 May 1860 because Edward Sayers resigned.

== Dates ==
Date	Event
16 April 1860	Edward Sayers resigned.
18 April 1860	Writ of election issued by the Speaker of the Legislative Assembly.
30 April 1860	Nominations at Ryde.
2 May 1860	Polling day.
8 May 1860	Return of writ

== Polling places ==
- Hunters Hill
- Lane Cove
- Manly Beach
- Pitt Water
- Ryde
- St Leonards
- Sydney

== Result ==
1860 St Leonards by-election Wednesday 2 May
Candidate	Votes	%
James Farnell (elected)	382	52.7
Isaac Shepherd	343	47.3
Total formal votes	725	100.0
Informal votes	0	0.0
Turnout	725	49.1

== See also ==
- Electoral results for the district of St Leonards
- List of New South Wales state by-elections
