= January 1883 East Sydney colonial by-election =

By-election in New South Wales, Australia

A by-election was held for the New South Wales Legislative Assembly electorate of East Sydney on 11 January 1883 because George Reid was appointed Minister of Public Instruction in the Stuart ministry. Such ministerial by-elections were usually uncontested and six ministers were re-elected unopposed. On this occasion a poll was required in East Sydney and Newtown (Henry Copeland). Copeland was defeated but regained a seat in parliament at the second by-election for East Sydney held on 23 January 1883. The six other ministers, Alexander Stuart (Illawarra), George Dibbs (St Leonards), Henry Cohen (West Maitland), James Farnell (New England), Francis Wright (Redfern) and Joseph Abbott (Gunnedah), were re-elected unopposed.

Albert Elkington had been the mayor of Balmain from February 1881 until February 1882.

== Dates ==
Date	Event
5 January 1883	Stuart ministry appointed.
6 January 1883	Writ of election issued by the Speaker of the Legislative Assembly.
10 January 1883	Nominations
11 January 1883	Polling day
16 January 1883	Return of writ

== Result ==
1883 East Sydney by-election Thursday 11 January
Candidate	Votes	%
George Reid (re-elected)	2,258	74.7
Albert Elkington	729	25.3
Total formal votes	2,887	99.2
Informal votes	24	0.8
Turnout	2,911	36.2

== Aftermath ==
The following year the Committee of Elections and Qualifications held that an error in the drafting of the constitution meant that Reid could not be validly appointed Minister of Public Instruction, and declared his seat vacant. Reid was defeated in the resulting by-election in February 1884.

== See also ==
- Electoral results for the district of East Sydney
- List of New South Wales state by-elections
