= 1883 Newtown colonial by-election =

By-election in New South Wales, Australia

A by-election was held for the New South Wales Legislative Assembly electorate of Newtown on 13 January 1883. The election was triggered by the appointment of Henry Copeland as Secretary for Public Works in the Stuart ministry.

George Reid comfortably retained his seat at the East Sydney by-election held the week before, while the six other ministers, Alexander Stuart (Illawarra), George Dibbs (St Leonards), Henry Cohen (West Maitland), James Farnell (New England), Francis Wright (Redfern) and Joseph Abbott (Gunnedah), were re-elected unopposed.

== Dates ==
Date	Event
5 January 1883	Henry Copeland accepts appointment as Secretary for Public Works.
6 January 1883	Writ of election issued by the Speaker of the Legislative Assembly.
11 January 1883	Nominations
13 January 1883	Polling day
16 January 1883	Return of writ

== Results ==
1883 Newtown by-election Saturday 13 January
Candidate	Votes	%
Joseph Mitchell (elected)	1,249	50.7
Henry Copeland (defeated)	1,217	49.4
Total formal votes	2,466	100.0
Informal votes	0	0.0
Turnout	2,466	64.7

== Aftermath ==
The next by-election was held the following week for East Sydney and Henry Copeland was comfortably elected.

== See also ==
- Electoral results for the district of Newtown
- List of New South Wales state by-elections
