= 1871 New England colonial by-election =

By-election in New South Wales, Australia

A by-election for the seat of New England in the New South Wales Legislative Assembly was held on 6 January 1871 because of the resignation of Charles Weaver to accept appointment as a police magistrate at Gosford.

== Dates ==
Date	Event
18 Jul 1871	Charles Weaver resigned.
29 July 1871	Writ of election issued by the Speaker of the Legislative Assembly.
1 August 1871	Charles Weaver appointed as a police magistrate.
21 August 1871	Nominations at Armidale
28 August 1871	Polling day
2 October 1871	Return of writ

== Result ==
1871 New England by-election Monday 28 August
Candidate	Votes	%
Samuel Terry (elected)	578	54.0
Robert Abbott	492	46.0
Total formal votes	1,070	100.0
Informal votes	0	0.00
Turnout	1,070	40.4

== See also ==
- Electoral results for the district of New England
- List of New South Wales state by-elections
