= 1883 East Sydney colonial by-election =

1883 East Sydney colonial by-election may refer to

- 1883 East Sydney colonial by-election 1 held on 11 January 1883
- 1883 East Sydney colonial by-election 2 held on 11 January 1883

== See also ==
- List of New South Wales state by-elections
