= William Judd =

William Judd may refer to:

- William Judd (English cricketer) (1845–1922), English cricketer
- William Judd (New Zealand cricketer) (1864–1906), New Zealand cricketer
- William Judd (Australian politician) (1847–1929), Australian politician
- William Nelson Judd (1887–1955), American politician
