= Municipality of St Peters =

Former local government area in New South Wales, Australia

Municipality of St Peters Sydney, New South Wales
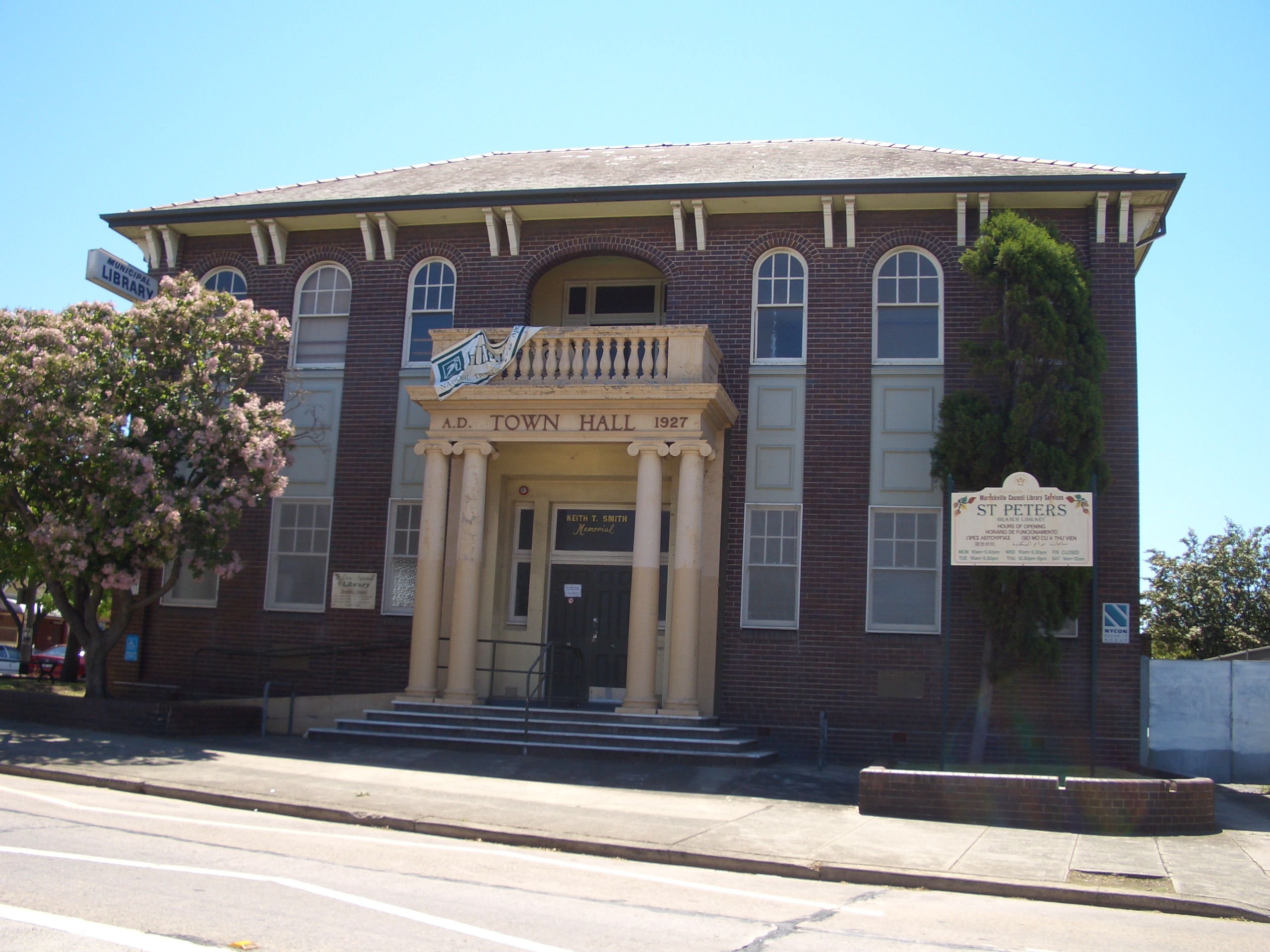
- St Peters Town Hall, on Unwins Bridge Road, Sydenham, seat of the council from 1927–1948.
- Population: 12,404 (1947 census)
  - Density: 4,000/km^{2} (10,360/sq mi)
- Established: 13 January 1871
- Abolished: 31 December 1948
- Area: 3.1 km^{2} (1.2 sq mi)
- Council seat: St Peters Town Hall
- Region: Inner West
- Parish: Petersham
LGAs around Municipality of St Peters:
Marrickville	Marrickville	Newtown
Canterbury	Municipality of St Peters	Alexandria
West Botany/Rockdale	Botany	North Botany/Mascot

The Municipality of St Peters was a local government area of Sydney, New South Wales, Australia. It was originally proclaimed as the Municipal District of St Peters on 13 January 1871. With an area of 4.2 square kilometres, it included the modern suburbs of St Peters, Tempe and Sydenham. The council was amalgamated with the Municipality of Marrickville, along with the Municipality of Petersham, with the passing of the Local Government (Areas) Act 1948, and is now part of the Inner West Council.

== Council history ==
The Municipal District of St Peters was first proclaimed on 13 January 1871. At the time the population was at about 3500, with 1088 houses within the municipal area. The Mayor of Marrickville, Charles St Julian, was appointed as the Returning Officer conducting the first election, and the first council was declared elected on 14 February 1871. The council comprised six aldermen elected to two wards, St Peter's Ward and Cook's River Ward, which each returned three aldermen. On 2 May 1878 a third ward, Brompton Ward, was added, bringing the total number of aldermen to nine.

The first elected council:

Seat	Alderman	Notes
Cook's River Ward	George Alfred Tucker	Superintendent of a Lunatic Asylum, Bay View House, Cook's River Road.
Cook's River Ward	Christopher Henry Lenehan	Grocer, Cook's River Road.
Cook's River Ward	George Rose	Freeholder, Unwin's Bridge Road.
St Peter's Ward	Thomas Percival	Gardener, Albert Street.
St Peter's Ward	James Turner	Leaseholder, Cook's River Road.
St Peter's Ward	Emanuel Harber	Brickmaker, Silver Street.

By the late 1890s, the municipality had grown in population to around 7000, with manufacturing and industry playing a greater role, particularly brickworks fed by clay from the Cooks River. An 1899 profile of the suburb in the Australian Town and Country Journal noted in this regard: "St. Peters is mainly a residential suburb, but it can boast of some industries, and on its borders are situated a number of very prosperous brickworks. There are portions of the district which are admirably adapted for manufacturing purposes, and no doubt in course of time full advantage will be taken of these opportunities." On 18 December 1903, the wards were rearranged to North Ward, Bellevue Ward and Tempe Ward. On 17 December 1919, a fourth ward was added when Brompton Ward was recreated.

=== Later history ===
By the end of the Second World War, the NSW Government had come to the conclusion that its ideas of infrastructure expansion could not be realised by the present system of the mostly-poor inner-city municipal councils and the Minister for Local Government, Joseph Cahill, passed a bill in 1948 that abolished a significant number of those councils. Under the Local Government (Areas) Act 1948, St Peters Municipal Council was merged, along with Petersham council, with the neighbouring Municipality of Marrickville which was located to the North.

== Mayors ==
Years	Mayor	Notes
14 February 1871 – 19 February 1873	George Alfred Tucker	
19 February 1873 – 9 July 1873	William Price	
9 July 1873 – 30 April 1877	John Tangelder Gorus	
30 April 1877 – 11 February 1878	William George Judd	
11 February 1878 – 10 July 1878	Thomas George McCauley	
17 July 1878 – 10 February 1881	William George Judd	
10 February 1881 – 18 February 1882	Samuel Henry Terry	
18 February 1882 – 20 March 1882	George Alfred Tucker	
20 March 1882 – 14 February 1883	Samuel Henry Terry	
14 February 1883 – 13 February 1884	William George Judd	
13 February 1884 – 11 February 1885	William Edwards	
11 February 1885 – 12 February 1886	George Godfrey Geering	
12 February 1886 – 10 February 1887	William Walmsley	
10 February 1887 – 16 February 1888	Archibald McKechnie	
16 February 1888 – 14 February 1889	James Fallick	
14 February 1889 – 14 February 1891	Robert Hewlett Judd	
14 February 1891 – 11 February 1892	William Edwards	
11 February 1892 – 16 February 1893	Elias James Harber	
16 February 1893 – 15 February 1895	Robert Hewlett Judd	
15 February 1895 – 7 February 1898	Alexander Stuart	
7 February 1898 – 14 February 1899	George Farr	
14 February 1899 – 13 February 1902	James Campbell	
13 February 1902 – 12 February 1903	John Benbow	
12 February 1903 – 7 February 1908	Edwin Spackman	
7 February 1908 – February 1912	William S. Baker	
February 1912 – 10 February 1913	William Henry Swain	
10 February 1913 – 4 February 1914	William Stanley Farr	
4 February 1914 – February 1915	Francis Sanderson	
February 1915 – February 1918	John Harvey Camp Bradshaw	
February 1918 – 13 February 1919	William Digby Rowe	
13 February 1919 – February 1920	William Pickering	
February 1920 – December 1920	Henry Adams	
December 1920 – December 1921	John Thomas Lane	
December 1921 – December 1922	William Ralph Green	
December 1922 – 7 December 1923	George Alfred Rowswell	
7 December 1923 – 10 December 1926	Edward Joseph Burrows	
10 December 1926 – December 1927	George Alfred Rowswell	
December 1927 – 10 December 1928	Edward Joseph Burrows	
10 December 1928 – 6 December 1929	Edwin Joseph O'Gradey	
6 December 1929 – 8 December 1930	Stanley Wycliffe Harvey	
8 December 1930 – December 1931	George Alfred Rowswell	
December 1931 – 8 December 1933	Henry Morton Holbeach	
8 December 1933 – 7 December 1934	Frederick Luck	
7 December 1934 – 11 June 1935	Henry Morton Holbeach	
11 June 1935 – 10 January 1936	William Henry Gleeson	
10 January 1936 – 8 December 1936	Spencer Thomas William Annabel	
8 December 1936 – 8 December 1937	Arthur Edward Bridge	
8 December 1937 – 9 December 1940	Guy Frank Applebee (ALP)	
9 December 1940 – 19 December 1941	James Trenear	
19 December 1941 – 14 December 1942	William Jacob Hogan	
14 December 1942 – 13 December 1943	Keith Thomas Smith (ALP)	
13 December 1943 – 17 December 1945	William Edgar Kendrick	
17 December 1945 – 6 December 1946	William Jacob Hogan (ALP)	
6 December 1946 – 15 December 1947	Keith Thomas Smith (ALP)	
15 December 1947 – 31 December 1948	Charles Lawrence Gillam (ALP)	

== Town Clerks ==
Years	Town Clerk	Notes
February 1871 – 1 August 1873	Frederick Keene	
1 August 1873 – 23 March 1885	Thomas King Leeder	
23 March 1885 – 9 November 1886	Samuel McCauley	
9 November 1886 – 3 September 1890	Andrew Thompson Gibson	
3 September 1890 – 23 September 1891	Frederick Weston Thompson	
23 September 1891 – 10 July 1899	Archibald Mackintosh	
10 July 1899 – 21 May 1900	George Hugh Melville	
21 May 1900 – 28 August 1911	Walter Grist Salmon	
28 August 1911 – 1 November 1912	William Irvine Donald	
18 November 1912 – 30 June 1913	John McCormack	
July 1913 – August 1919	Donald Morrison	
August 1919 – 31 December 1948	Frank H. Terry	
