= Mayor of St Peters =

Mayor of St Peters may refer to

- Mayor of St Peters (New South Wales) between 1871 and 1948.
- Mayor of St Peters (South Australia) between 1885 and 1997

== See also ==
- List of New South Wales state by-elections
