= 1887 New England colonial by-election =

By-election in New South Wales, Australia

A by-election was held for the New South Wales Legislative Assembly electorate of New England on 10 January 1887 because of the resignation of William Proctor. He had been found guilty by a jury of having sat and voted in parliament whilst he had an interest in a contract with the Government and the statutory penalty of £500 was imposed. Proceedings were stayed pending Proctor's appeal to the Full Court of the Supreme Court, however he resigned stating that he desired to have the verdict of his constituents.

== Dates ==
Date	Event
18 December 1886	Proctor found guilty of having sat and voted whilst he had an interest in a government contract.
20 December 1886	William Proctor resigned.
29 December 1886	Writ of election issued by the Speaker of the Legislative Assembly.
6 January 1887	Nominations.
10 January 1887	Polling day
20 January 1887	Return of writ
26 January 1887	Parliament dissolved
14 November 1887	Proctor's conviction set aside by the Full Court of the Supreme Court.

== Background ==
Thomas Logan and David Proudfoot were partners in a contract for the construction of a section of the Illawarra railway. Proudfoot became insolvent which dissolved the partnership. Logan wanted to carry on the contract and sought Proctor's assistance to get him a bank guarantee. Proctor became one of Logan's guarantors, and wishing to protect himself took an assignment of the contract from Logan. At the time of taking the assignment Proctor was a member of the Legislative Assembly, and Proudfoot sought to recover the penalty of £500 because Proctor, being a member of the Legislative Assembly, had entered into a contract with the Government for or on account of the public service, within the meaning of s. 28 of the Constitution of New South Wales. The jury found for Proudfoot for the full amount claimed. Proceedings were stayed pending Proctor's appeal to the Full Court of the Supreme Court.

== Candidates ==
This by-election was at the emergence of political parties in New South Wales, where the division was on fiscal lines of free trade and protection.

- William Cleghorn declared himself to be a free trader. This was the only occasion on which he stood for election.
- Charles Givney was a protectionist. This was the second of five times in which he stood unsuccessfully for parliament.
- William Proctor was the sitting member and described himself as a fair trader. He opposed the Jennings ministry, which formed the Protectionist Party, but also opposed Sir Henry Parkes who would lead the Free Trade Party at the 1887 election.

== Result ==
1887 New England by-election Monday 10 January
Candidate	Votes	%
William Proctor (re-elected)	673	45.7
Charles Givney	484	32.8
William Cleghorn	317	21.5
Total formal votes	1,474	100.0
Informal votes	0	0.0
Turnout	1,474	37.7

== Aftermath ==
Proctor resumed his seat in the Legislative Assembly however Parliament was dissolved on 26 January. He did not stand as a candidate at the election on 10 February.

His appeal the Full Court of the Supreme Court was successful, which held that (1) Proctor did not receive any money that was payable under the contract and (2) the contract required the consent of the government. As that had not been given, Proctor had no rights against the government nor did the government have any rights against Proctor. The Full Court's view was that this was not a sufficient interest to disqualify Proctor from sitting and voting as a member.

== See also ==
- Electoral results for the district of New England
- List of New South Wales state by-elections
