= 1887 St Leonards colonial by-election =

By-election in New South Wales, Australia

A by-election was held for the New South Wales Legislative Assembly electorate of St Leonards on 24 October 1887 because of the resignation of Sir Henry Parkes (Free Trade) due to insolvency, having assigned his estate for the benefit of his creditors.

== Dates ==
Date	Event
14 October 1887	Sir Henry Parkes assigned his estate for the benefit of his creditors.
18 October 1887	Sir Henry Parkes resigned.
19 October 1887	Writ of election issued by the Speaker of the Legislative Assembly.
24 October 1887	Nominations
25 October 1887	Polling day
26 October 1887	Return of writ

== Result ==
1887 St Leonards by-election]] Monday 24 October
Party	Candidate	Votes	%	±%
Free Trade	Sir Henry Parkes (elected)	unopposed		
Free Trade hold				

== See also ==
- Electoral results for the district of St Leonards
- List of New South Wales state by-elections
