= Municipality of Mascot =

Former local government area in New South Wales, Australia

- Local government area
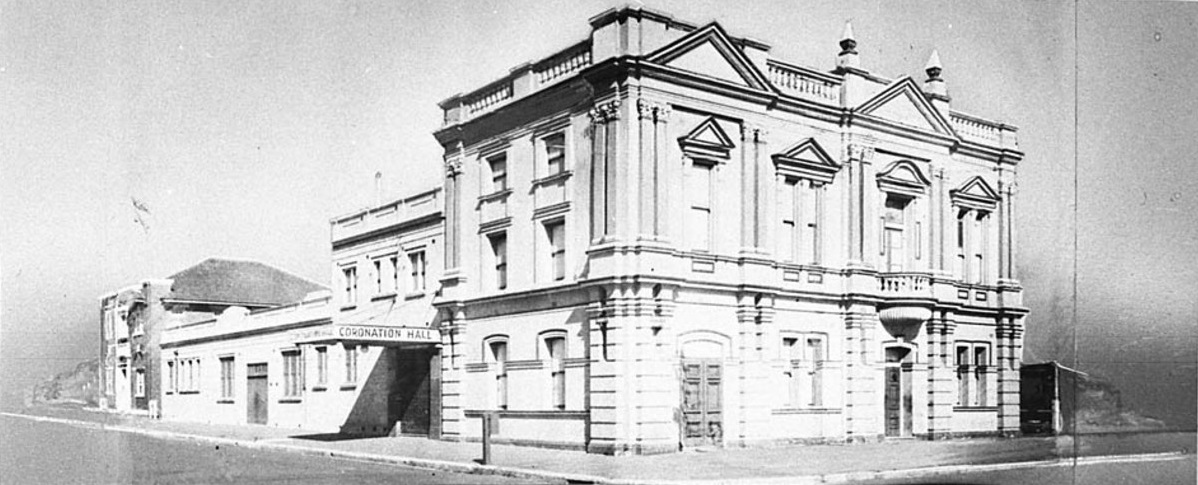
- Mascot Town Hall, Coronation Hall and Council Chambers by Sam Hood in 1938.

- Country: Australia
- State: New South Wales
- Region: South-Eastern Sydney
- Established: 29 March 1888 (Nth Botany); 31 October 1911 (Mascot)
- Abolished: 31 December 1948
- Council seat: Mascot Town Hall

Area
  - Total: 9 km^{2} (3.5 sq mi)

Population
  - Total: 17,984 (1947 census)
  - Density: 2,000/km^{2} (5,180/sq mi)
- Parish: Botany
LGAs around Municipality of Mascot
Alexandria	Waterloo	Randwick
St Peters	Municipality of Mascot	Randwick
Rockdale	Botany	Botany

The Municipality of Mascot was a local government area in the inner south of Sydney, New South Wales, Australia. The municipality was proclaimed as the Borough of North Botany on 29 March 1888 and was renamed to the Municipality of Mascot, in order to differentiate itself from their southern neighbour, from 31 October 1911. It included the modern suburbs of Eastlakes and Daceyville, with parts of Mascot and Pagewood. From 1 January 1949, the council was amalgamated into the Municipality of Botany, with the passing of the Local Government (Areas) Act 1948.

== Council history ==
=== Early years and development ===
The North Botany area was first incorporated on 29 March 1888, when the Governor of New South Wales, Lord Carrington, proclaimed the "Borough of North Botany", the same day the Municipality of Botany was proclaimed immediately to the south. The first council was elected on 4 June 1888, with nine aldermen elected at-large:

Alderman	Notes
James Coward	Dairyman, North Botany.
John Moloney	Teacher, South Waterloo.
George Henry Baily	Grocer, North Botany.
Aaron Laycock	Dairyman, North Botany.
Stephen Tancred	Tallow refiner, North Botany.
Alfred Webber Sparks	Cabinet-maker, North Botany.
William Parker	Gardener, North Botany.
Edward Hicks	Boot manufacturer, North Botany.
Henry Ramsay	Bus proprietor, North Botany.

The Council first met on 7 June 1888 at "Eurimbla", the house of the first returning officer John Pottie, and James Coward was elected the first mayor, with William Coleman appointed first Town Clerk in July 1888. In February 1889 council petitioned for the division of the area into Wards: North Ward, South Ward and Central Ward. This was accepted and proclaimed on 10 June 1889. On 31 January 1908, these wards were abolished. From 28 December 1906, following the passing of the Local Government Act, 1906, the council was renamed as the "Municipality of North Botany". Aldermen at this time included Henry Punter (1894–1901), later Mayor of The Glebe.

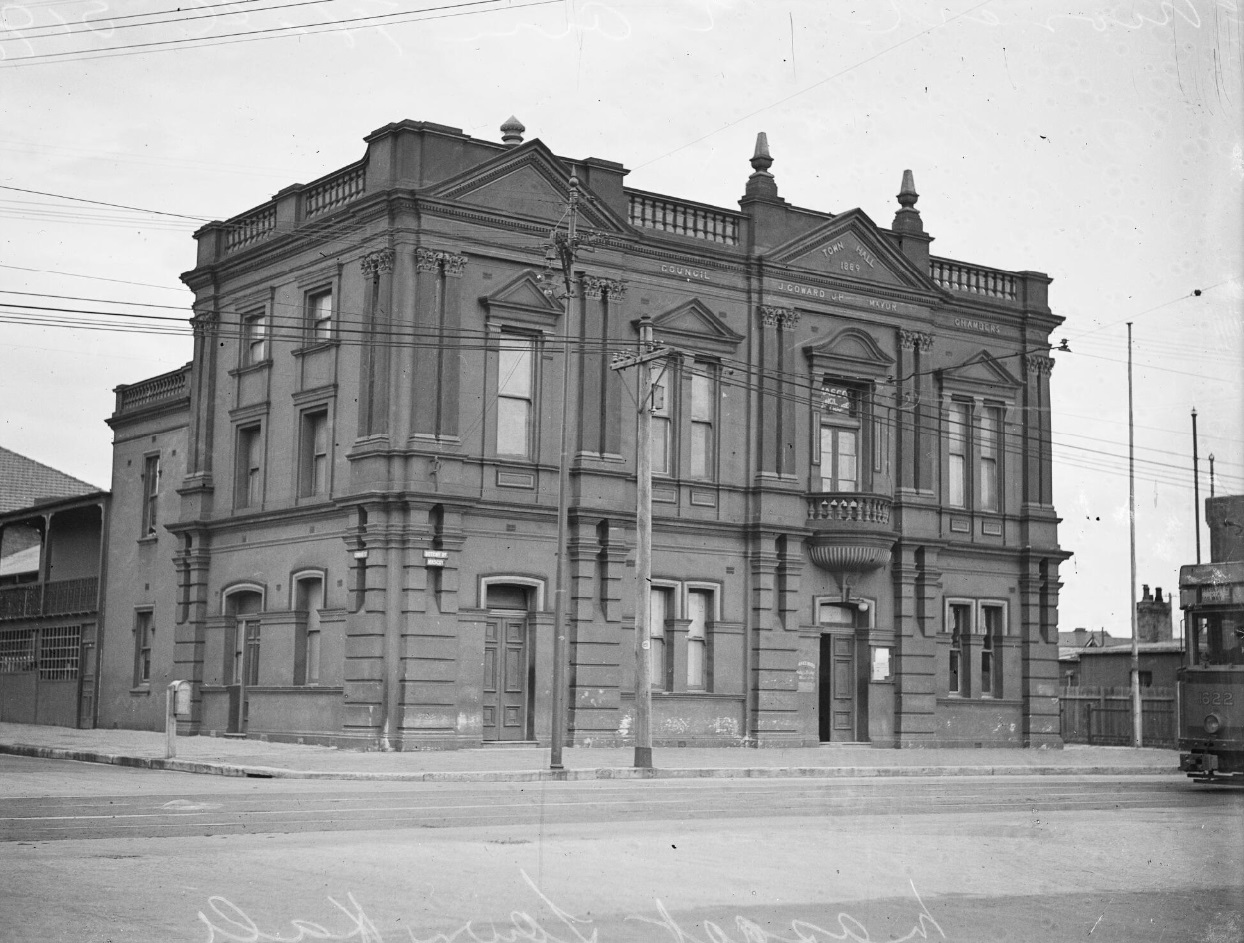
Mascot Town Hall on the corner of Botany Road and Coward Street, pictured in 1929, was the primary meeting place of the council from 1890 to 1929. It was heavily altered in the 1970s.

At the July 1888 meeting, council resolved to purchase a block of land at the corner of Botany Road and Ricketty Street (Later Edward Street, then Coward Street, after the first mayor) at the cost of £600. On 21 December 1889, the foundation stone was laid for the new Town Hall, designed in the Victorian Italianate style by C. Hawkins and built by Edward Christie. The Town Hall was officially opened by the Mayor, James Coward, on 2 August 1890. However, within a few years, it had become apparent that this town hall was inadequate for the purposes of a growing council and area, along with the need for a modern function hall compliant with the Theatres and Public Halls Act. Council resolved in 1910, to commission expansions along the Edward Street frontage. This expansion, designed in a similar style by Buchanan & McKay, Architects, and built by Peter Doulan, was named "Coronation Hall" to commemorate the coronation of George V and opened on 8 July 1911.

Following incorporation, the council area developed a strong industrial character similar to its northern neighbours of Alexandria, Waterloo and St Peters. A Sydney Morning Herald profile of the council in 1914 expressed this change: "During the first year of its existence, the council had less than £1000 to work upon. This year the revenue will reach £6000. The district now carries a population of 8500, which is housed in 1750 buildings. [...] Like its neighbour, Botany, Mascot has developed into an industrial centre, and in this respect is making splendid progress. In fact, the whole district will in time become the Birmingham of Australia."

=== Name change ===
With these changes in the local area, the "North Botany" name of the council however raised negative connotations and it was felt in council that it was too similar in name to their southern neighbour; As a result, in early 1911, council conducted a referendum of ratepayers to decide on a new name, with "Ascot" being chosen, which referenced the nearby racecourse. However, when council submitted this request to the state Minister for Public Works, Arthur Griffith, and the Commonwealth Postmaster General, Josiah Thomas, it was rejected based on the view that "Ascot" was a term already well-used for place names. Council then debated on several other options, including "Boronia" and "Booralee", before "Mascot" was chosen, accepted and proclaimed on 31 October 1911.

=== Later history ===
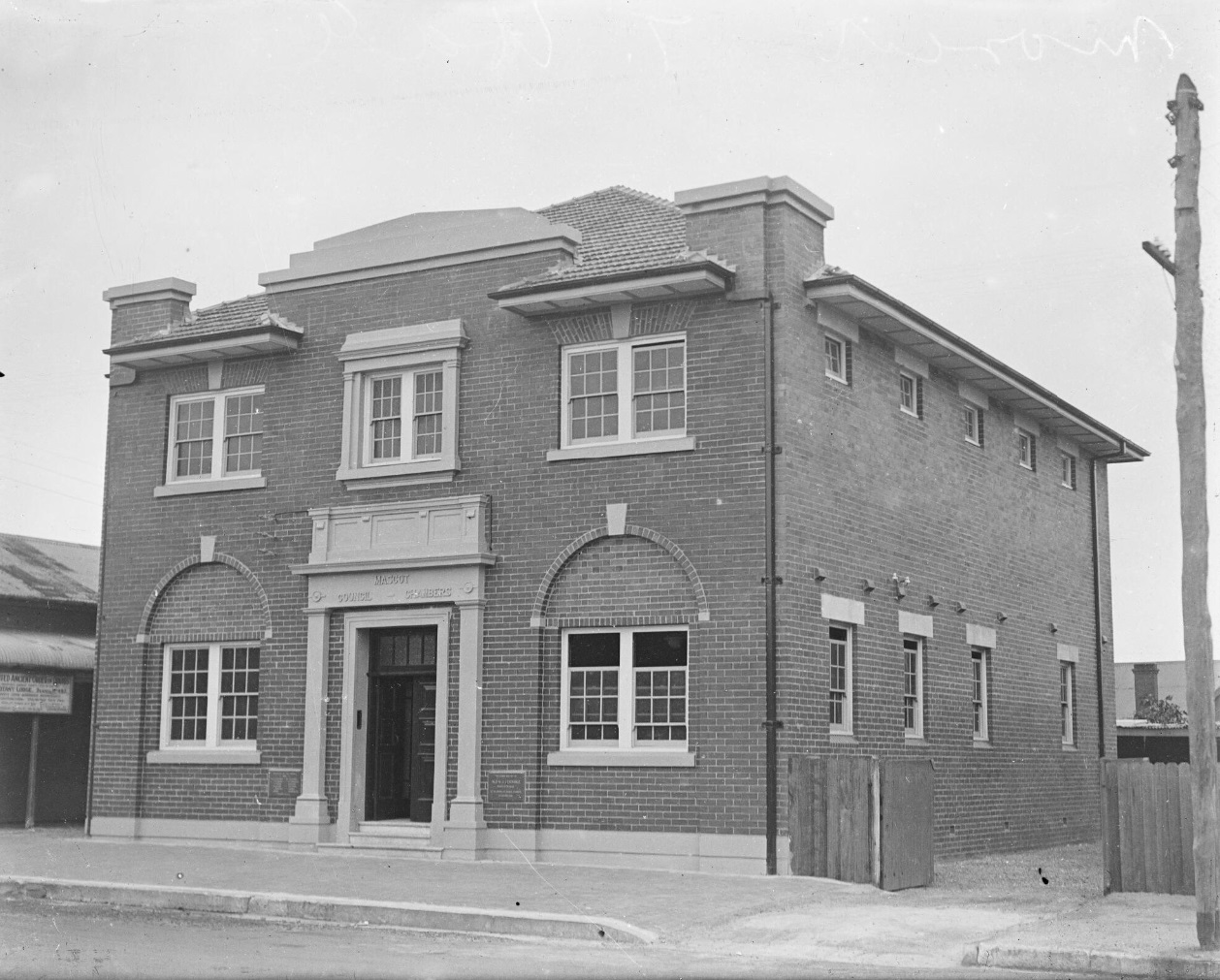
Mascot Council Chambers on Coward Street, opened in 1929, was the meeting-place of the council from 1929 to 1948.

The council established a reputation for its probity and prudent financial management, at a time when the small Sydney municipalities were often struggling to keep up with infrastructure demands, population growth and political infighting. The Construction & Local Government Journal praised Mascot council in this vein in a March 1920 editorial, noting "Mascot is essentially a working man's suburb, but the fashionable socialism of Labor Government does not appear to find favor with the sturdy, thrifty working men and intelligent women who have votes in this Municipality, and the reason is not very far to seek, for it is a remarkable circumstance that nearly all the residents own their own homes." At the same time, planning had begun for the construction of a larger public airfield at Mascot, with the Commonwealth Government purchasing 65 hectares for this purpose in 1921. Indeed, the Mayor in 1920, Thomas Hicks, declared: "The year has marked a new era for the Municipality of Mascot in the establishment of an aerodrome by Australian Aircraft & Engineering, on the area between Cook's River and Old Botany Road. This site has been pronounced as the favored-by-nature of any other in the County of Cumberland, and the establishment of the air-service undertaking must bring Mascot very prominently before the world." Such was the pride the council took in its growing recognition with aviation, that they changed the council seal in the 1930s to depict an aircraft in flight. Aldermen during this time included Thomas Mutch (1923–1930), MLA for Botany (1917–1930).

In 1929, Mascot council inaugurated a new Council Chambers building, designed in the Inter-war Georgian Revival style by R. S. Hamilton and built by J. Figures of Randwick, located on Coward Street next to the 1890 Town Hall and 1911 Coronation Hall. This building remained the council seat until amalgamation in 1948 and was demolished in the 1970s to be replaced by the Botany Administration Centre.

By the end of the Second World War, the NSW Government had realised that its ideas of infrastructure expansion could not be effected by the present system of the patchwork of small municipal councils across Sydney and the Minister for Local Government, Joseph Cahill, following the recommendations of the 1945–46 Clancy Royal Commission on Local Government Boundaries, passed a bill in 1948 that abolished a significant number of those councils. Under the Local Government (Areas) Act 1948, Mascot Municipal Council became the First Ward of the Municipality of Botany, which was located immediately to the south. The serving Mascot Town Clerk, T. G. Barber, became Town Clerk of the re-formed Municipality of Botany.

== Mayors ==
Years	Mayor	Notes
7 June 1888 – 11 February 1891	James Coward	
11 February 1891 – 17 February 1893	Alfred Webber Sparks	
17 February 1893 – 16 February 1894	Aaron Laycock	
16 February 1894 – 16 February 1895	James Pallett	
16 February 1895 – 10 February 1896	James Thornton	
10 February 1896 – 11 February 1897	Benjamin Farrar Reeve	
11 February 1897 – February 1898	James Coward	
February 1898 – 11 February 1899	James Thornton	
11 February 1899 – 16 February 1900	Daniel Lee	
16 February 1900 – 18 February 1901	Benjamin Farrar Reeve	
18 February 1901 – 15 February 1902	Michael Gearin	
15 February 1902 – 11 February 1904	James Coward	
11 February 1904 – 18 February 1905	Aaron Laycock	
18 February 1905 – 9 May 1905	Alfred Webber Sparks	
9 May 1905 – 14 February 1908	Alfred James King	
14 February 1908 – February 1909	Aaron Laycock	
February 1909 – May 1910	James Thornton	
May 1910 – February 1911	Thomas Henry Hicks	
February 1911 – 8 February 1912	Francis James Chipman	
8 February 1912 – February 1913	Charles Munger	
February 1913 – February 1914	Francis James Chipman	
February 1914 – February 1916	Thomas Henry Hicks	
February 1916 – 9 February 1918	Clarence Edgar Felton Hughes	
9 February 1918 – 11 February 1919	John Ingram	
11 February 1919 – 10 February 1920	Clarence Edgar Felton Hughes	
10 February 1920 – December 1920	Thomas Henry Hicks	
December 1920 – December 1921	Francis James Chipman	
December 1921 – 11 December 1922	Clarence Edgar Felton Hughes	
11 December 1922 – December 1925	Richard Stephen King	
December 1925 – 18 December 1929	Michael Joseph L'Estrange	
18 December 1929 – December 1931	David Allen Alexander	
December 1931 – December 1932	Arthur Henry Loveridge	
December 1932 – December 1935	Cyril Joseph Dransfield	
December 1935 – December 1936	Francis James Chipman	
December 1936 – December 1937	John Elder Galloway	
December 1937 – 6 December 1941	Clifford John Sweeney	
December 1941 – December 1942	Gladstone Sparks	
December 1942 – December 1943	Arthur Benjamin Finney	
December 1943 – December 1944	Spencer John Middlemiss	
December 1944 – December 1945	Alfred Phillip Price Lever	
December 1945 – December 1946	William Todd	
December 1946 – December 1947	Charles Leslie Gray	
December 1947 – 31 December 1948	Alexander Finlayson	

== Town Clerks ==
Years	Town Clerk	Notes
4 July 1888 – 5 May 1891	William Allen Coleman	
5 May 1891 – December 1905	Thomas Alexander Watson	
25 January 1906 – 14 May 1908	Alfred Webber Sparks	
14 May 1908 – 24 May 1909	Thomas Arthur Tester	
24 May 1909 – 22 December 1909	Charles Arthur Cork	
22 December 1909 – 20 May 1912	Henry Dunstan	
20 May 1912 – 20 January 1933	William Hughes	
January 1933 – September 1934	Edgar Jay	
September 1934 – 31 December 1948	T. G. Barber	
