= St Peters Town Hall =

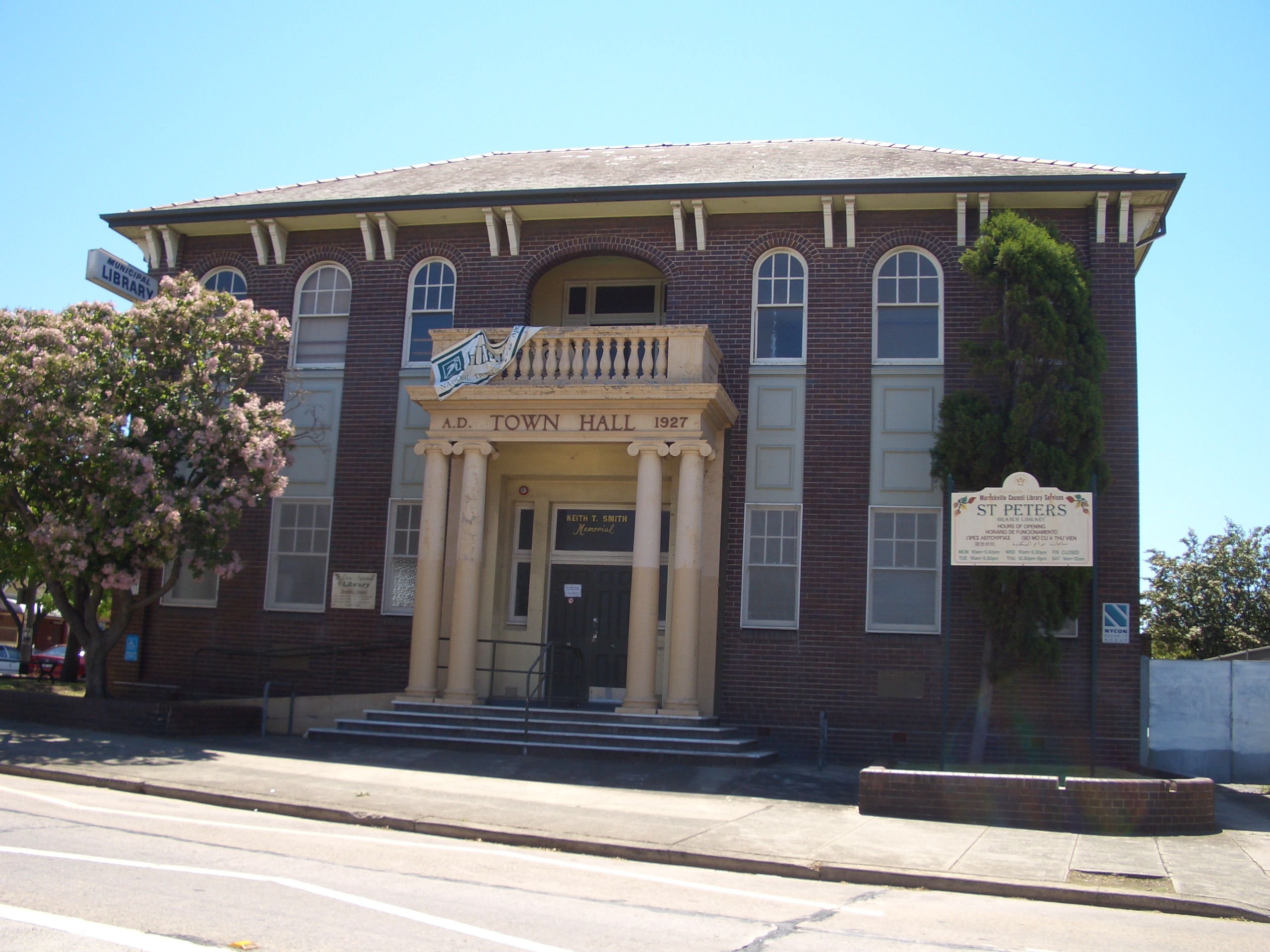
- St Peters Town Hall in 2006.
- Interactive map of the St Peters Town Hall area

General information
- Type: Government town hall
- Architectural style: Inter-War Free Classical
- Location: Sydenham, New South Wales, Australia
- Construction started: 16 April 1927
- Completed: 3 December 1927
- Renovated: 2009
- Client: St Peters Municipal Council
- Owner: Inner West Council (current)

Design and construction
- Architecture firm: J. Campbell & Son
- Main contractor: William M. Martin

The St Peters Town Hall is a heritage-listed town hall located in Sydenham, New South Wales, Australia. The Town Hall was built in 1927 in the Inter-War Free Classical architectural style by architects J. Campbell & Son, and replaced the 1878 St Peters Town Hall, which was located on the Princes Highway and was resumed by the state government in 1926 for road-widening. The Town Hall was the seat of St Peters Municipal Council from 1927 to 1948 and from 1949 was a branch library and community hall of the Municipality of Marrickville, which absorbed St Peters.

== Second St Peters Town Hall ==
Designed by J. Campbell & Son, the foundation stone of the town hall was laid by Deputy Mayor Edward Burrows on 16 April 1927. Completed to a cost of £7000, the hall was officially opened by the mayor, George Rowswell, on 3 December 1927.

== Heritage listing and conservation ==
The Town Hall and its interiors was first listed in 2001 under the Marrickville Local Environment Plan (updated 2011) as "one of the last buildings which commemorates the old Municipality of St Peters."

== See also ==
- List of town halls in Sydney
- Architecture of Sydney
