= List of mayors of St Peters (New South Wales) =

People who served as the mayor of the Municipality of St Peters are:

Years	Mayor	Notes
14 February 1871 – 19 February 1873	George Alfred Tucker	
19 February 1873 – 9 July 1873	William Price	
9 July 1873 – 30 April 1877	John Tangelder Gorus	
30 April 1877 – 11 February 1878	William George Judd	
11 February 1878 – 10 July 1878	Thomas George McCauley	
17 July 1878 – 10 February 1881	William George Judd	
10 February 1881 – 18 February 1882	Samuel Henry Terry	
18 February 1882 – 20 March 1882	George Alfred Tucker	
20 March 1882 – 14 February 1883	Samuel Henry Terry	
14 February 1883 – 13 February 1884	William George Judd	
13 February 1884 – 11 February 1885	William Edwards	
11 February 1885 – 12 February 1886	George Godfrey Geering	
12 February 1886 – 10 February 1887	William Walmsley	
10 February 1887 – 16 February 1888	Archibald McKechnie	
16 February 1888 – 14 February 1889	James Fallick	
14 February 1889 – 14 February 1891	Robert Hewlett Judd	
14 February 1891 – 11 February 1892	William Edwards	
11 February 1892 – 16 February 1893	Elias James Harber	
16 February 1893 – 15 February 1895	Robert Hewlett Judd	
15 February 1895 – 7 February 1898	Alexander Stuart	
7 February 1898 – 14 February 1899	George Farr	
14 February 1899 – 13 February 1902	James Campbell	
13 February 1902 – 12 February 1903	John Benbow	
12 February 1903 – 7 February 1908	Edwin Spackman	
7 February 1908 – February 1912	William S. Baker	
February 1912 – 10 February 1913	William Henry Swain	
10 February 1913 – 4 February 1914	William Stanley Farr	
4 February 1914 – February 1915	Francis Sanderson	
February 1915 – February 1918	John Harvey Camp Bradshaw	
February 1918 – 13 February 1919	William Digby Rowe	
13 February 1919 – February 1920	William Pickering	
February 1920 – December 1920	Henry Adams	
December 1920 – December 1921	John Thomas Lane	
December 1921 – December 1922	William Ralph Green	
December 1922 – 7 December 1923	George Alfred Rowswell	
7 December 1923 – 10 December 1926	Edward Joseph Burrows	
10 December 1926 – December 1927	George Alfred Rowswell	
December 1927 – 10 December 1928	Edward Joseph Burrows	
10 December 1928 – 6 December 1929	Edwin Joseph O'Gradey	
6 December 1929 – 8 December 1930	Stanley Wycliffe Harvey	
8 December 1930 – December 1931	George Alfred Rowswell	
December 1931 – 8 December 1933	Henry Morton Holbeach	
8 December 1933 – 7 December 1934	Frederick Luck	
7 December 1934 – 11 June 1935	Henry Morton Holbeach	
11 June 1935 – 10 January 1936	William Henry Gleeson	
10 January 1936 – 8 December 1936	Spencer Thomas William Annabel	
8 December 1936 – 8 December 1937	Arthur Edward Bridge	
8 December 1937 – 9 December 1940	Guy Frank Applebee (ALP)	
9 December 1940 – 19 December 1941	James Trenear	
19 December 1941 – 14 December 1942	William Jacob Hogan	
14 December 1942 – 13 December 1943	Keith Thomas Smith (ALP)	
13 December 1943 – 17 December 1945	William Edgar Kendrick	
17 December 1945 – 6 December 1946	William Jacob Hogan (ALP)	
6 December 1946 – 15 December 1947	Keith Thomas Smith (ALP)	
15 December 1947 – 31 December 1948	Charles Lawrence Gillam (ALP)	
