= 23 January 1883 East Sydney colonial by-election =

By-election in New South Wales, Australia

A by-election was held for the New South Wales Legislative Assembly electorate of East Sydney on 23 January 1883 because John McElhone had also been elected to Upper Hunter and chose to resign from East Sydney.

== Dates ==
Date	Event
30 November 1882	Election for East Sydney.
11 January 1883	First by-election for East Sydney.
17 January 1883	John McElhone resigned as member for East Sydney.
18 January 1883	Writ of election issued by the Speaker of the Legislative Assembly.
22 January 1883	Nominations
23 January 1883	Polling day
24 January 1883	Return of writ

== Candidates ==
- Henry Copeland was appointed Secretary for Public Works in the Stuart ministry, however he was defeated in the subsequent by-election for Newtown. This was the first by-election following his defeat.
- Arthur Renwick was a doctor of medicine who was a former member for East Sydney who had been defeated at the 1882 election.

== Result ==
1883 East Sydney by-election Tuesday 23 January
Candidate	Votes	%
Henry Copeland (elected)	2,942	67.8
Arthur Renwick	1,397	32.2
Total formal votes	4,339	100.0
Informal votes	0	0.0
Turnout	4,339	53.9

== See also ==
- Electoral results for the district of East Sydney
- List of New South Wales state by-elections
