= William Tunks =

Australian politician

William Tunks (8 April 1816 – 12 April 1883) was an Australian politician.

He was born in the Nepean district to timber merchant John Tunks and Esther Arndell. He was an apprentice carpenter at Parramatta and later the licensee of an inn and a metal contractor. He was the first mayor of St Leonards and was re-elected fifteen times. On 11 December 1838 he married Margaret McCone Bisseck, with whom he had eleven children. In 1864 he was elected to the New South Wales Legislative Assembly for St Leonards, serving until his retirement in 1874. Tunks died at St Leonards in 1883.

He was also a cricketer. He played one first-class match for New South Wales in 1855/56.

== See also ==
- List of New South Wales representative cricketers

New South Wales Legislative Assembly
| Preceded by Isaac Shepherd | Member for St Leonards; 1864 – 1874 | Succeeded by James Farnell |
Civic offices
| New title | Mayor of St Leonards; 1867 – 1883 | Succeeded by Joseph Musgrave |
