= James Inglis (politician) =

Australian politician

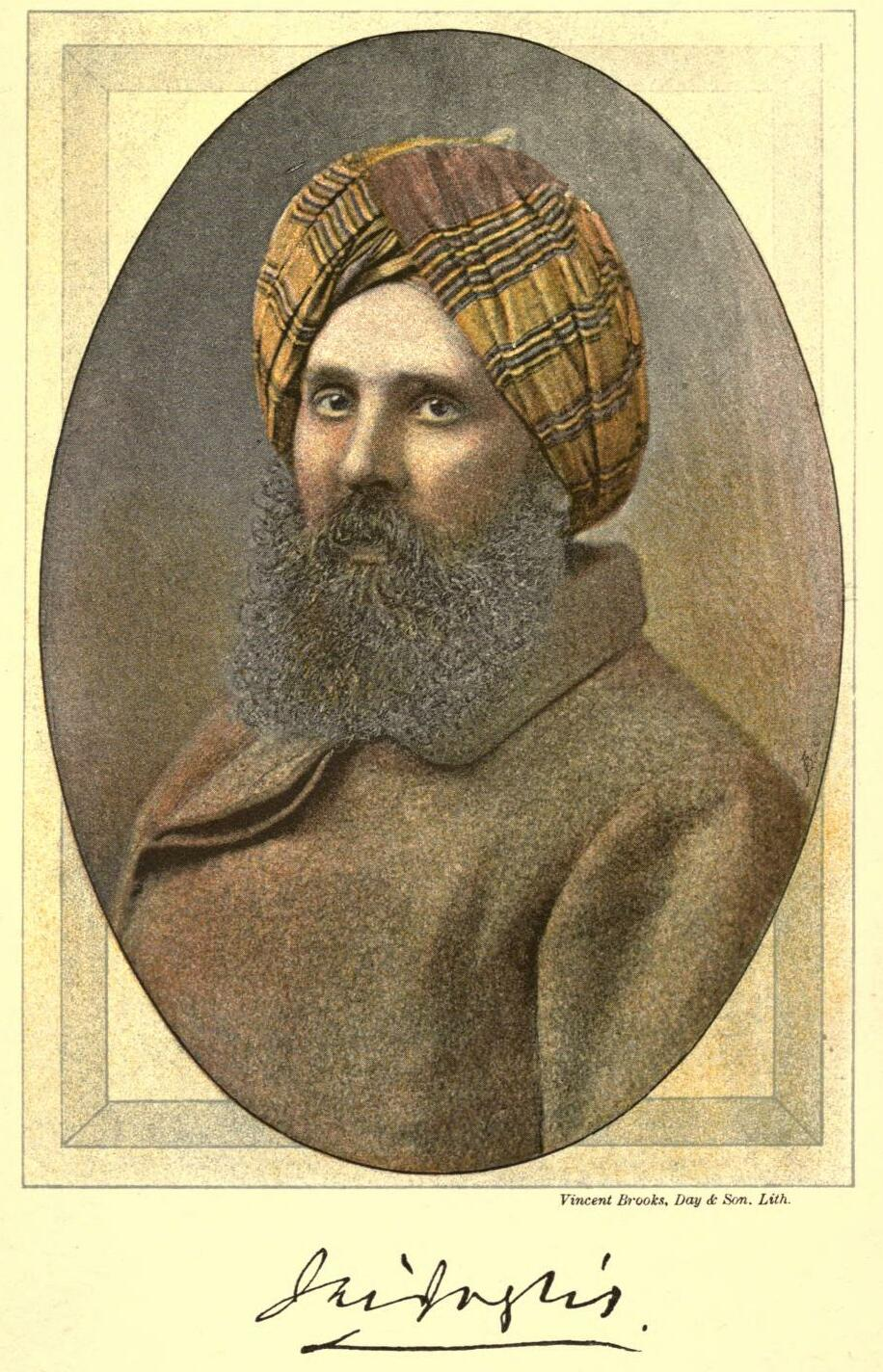
In Indian attire

James Inglis (24 November 1845 – 15 October 1908) was a colonial tea planter, merchant, writer who worked in India before serving as a politician in colonial New South Wales. He was involved in tea trade between India and Australia. He also wrote poetry, books on travel and sport hunting.

== Biography ==
Inglis was the son of Rev. Robert Inglis, M.A. of the Free Church and Helen née Brand, born at Edzell, Forfarshire, Scotland. He was educated at University of Edinburgh. He visited New Zealand in 1864 to join the gold rush at Timaru, went to India at the end of 1866 where his brother Alexander was a Calcutta tea merchant. He settled there as an indigo planter and indulged in sport in his spare time and wrote under the pen name "Maori". He served as a Famine Commissioner in Bhagalpur in 1875, and Executive Commissioner for the Government of India to the Melbourne International Exhibition of 1880–81. He suffered from rheumatism from 1877 and left to Australia to write for the Pioneer Mail newspaper. He also became a correspondent for the Echo and Sydney Mail. He married Mary née Nichol in 1879 and worked with Cowan and Co. He worked as an agent for trade between India and Australia becoming agent in Sydney for the Indian Tea Association. In 1883 he joined W. P. Brown to set up Inglis, Brown and Company. In 1884 he was involved in introducing Indian plants of economic value into Australia. In 1886 he became a vice president of the Free Trade Association. He became a representative in the New South Wales Legislative Assembly for New England in 1885, and was Minister of Public Instruction in the Parkes ministry (1887–1889) from January 1887 to January 1889.

== "Waltzing Matilda" ==
"Waltzing Matilda"
Tune for "Waltzing Matilda"

His company James Inglis & Co marketed the brand Billy Tea. Inglis wanted to use “Waltzing Matilda” as an advertising jingle for Billy Tea. Harry Nathan published a setting of “Waltzing Matilda” in late December 1902. Its melody was a variation of Christina Macpherson’s and he made some changes to the lyrics. In early 1903, Inglis purchased the rights to “Waltzing Matilda” and asked Marie Cowan, the wife of one of his managers, to try her hand at turning it into an advertising jingle. Cowan made some more changes to the words and some very minor changes to Nathan's melody. She gave the song a simple, brisk, harmonious accompaniment which made it very catchy. Her song, published in 1903, grew in popularity, and Cowan's arrangement remains the best-known version of "Waltzing Matilda". The connection between “Waltzing Matilda” and Billy Tea is still recorded on packets of Billy Tea sold today.

== Publications ==
Inglis wrote to the press under the signature "Maori," and, in 1879, served as editor of the Newcastle Morning Herald. His books included:

- "Tirhoot Rhymes" (1873)
- "Sport and Work on the Nepaul Frontier" (Macmillan & Co., London, 1880)
- "Our Australian Cousins" (Macmillan, 1882)
- "Our New Zealand Cousins" (Sampson Low & Co., London, 1886)
- "Tent Life in Tiger Land" (Sampson Low, 1888)
- "Oor Ain Folk" (1894)
- "The Humor of the Scot" (1894)

== Private life ==
Inglis married Mary Nichol in Sydney in October 1879. She died in 1903. On 13 December 1905 he married Ethel Kate Mason, née Macpherson, who survived him. There were no children from either marriage.

Inglis died in Strathfield, Sydney, of kidney disease on 15 October 1908 and was buried in the Presbyterian section of Rookwood cemetery.

New South Wales Legislative Assembly
Preceded by James Farnell	Member for New England; 1885–1894; Served alongside: Proctor/Copeland, none/Lonsdale	Abolished
