= William Nelson Judd =

American politician (1887–1955)

William Nelson Judd (May 4, 1887 – January 13, 1955) was an American politician.

Judd was born in Schuyler, Nebraska on May 4, 1887. His family moved to Clinton, Iowa, when he was two years old. He attended school in Clinton, and, at the age of 15, began working as a barber. Judd married Katherine Paulson in 1906, with whom he raised a son. That same year, Judd was hired by the Chicago Northwestern Railroad as a freight brakeman. He was successively promoted to conductor in 1913, and terminal yardmaster based in Belle Plaine in 1919. Four years later, Judd moved back to Clinton to continue his yardmaster duties there.

Judd was affiliated with the Republican Party. Between 1926 and 1934, he sat on the Clinton City Council. From 1943 to 1944, he was mayor of Clinton. Judd was first elected to the Iowa House of Representatives from District 45 in 1936. He served four consecutive terms, until 1945. Judd recaptured his old district in 1950, and served until his death in Des Moines on January 13, 1955. Judd was survived by his second wife, Olga Willke Herrick. whom he had married in 1952 after the death of his first the previous year, as well as his son.
