= Thomas Creswell =

Australian politician

Thomas Edgar Creswell (18 March 1852 – 5 January 1920) was an Australian politician.

He was born in Hobart, Van Diemen's Land, to schoolmaster Thomas Creswell and Martha Chadwick. After attending Hobart Collegiate School he became a law clerk in 1867, and in 1874 was admitted as a solicitor. Around 1877 he married Charlotte Hannah, with whom he had a daughter. He moved to Sydney in 1880, becoming a partner in Creswell and Whatmore. In 1904 he was elected to the New South Wales Legislative Assembly as the Liberal member for St Leonards. He lost preselection in 1907 and stood as an Independent Liberal, but was defeated. A North Sydney alderman from 1901 to 1913, he was honorary treasurer of the North Sydney Benevolent Society from around 1904 to 1912. He was struck off the solicitors' roll in 1912, and later worked as a conveyancing clerk. Creswell died in North Sydney in 1920.

New South Wales Legislative Assembly
Preceded by Edward Clark	Member for St Leonards; 1904–1907	Succeeded by Edward Clark
