= Sydenham, New South Wales =

Sydenham
- Suburb
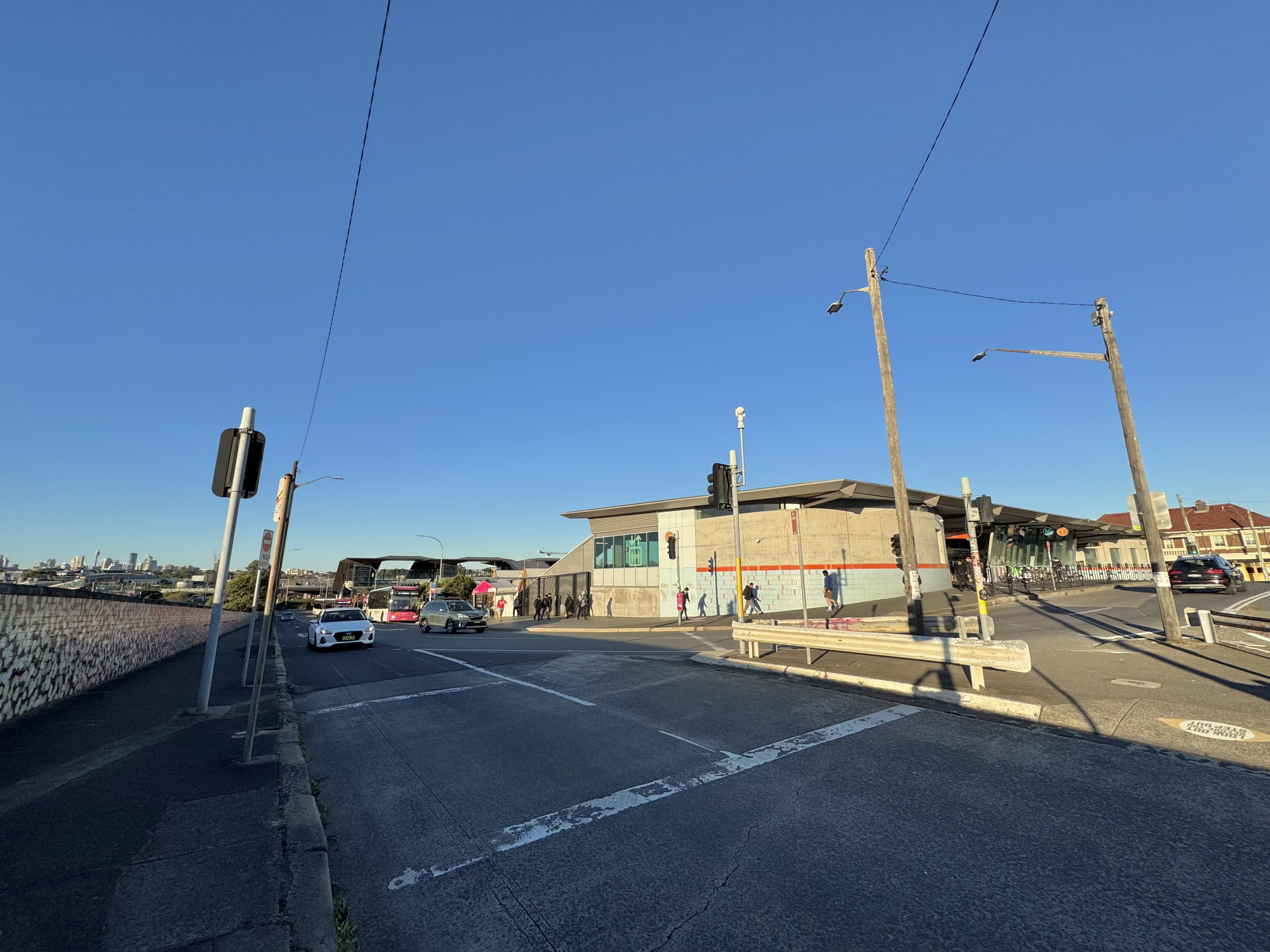
- Sydenham Station

- Interactive map of Sydenham
- Coordinates: 33°55′04″S 151°10′04″E
- Country: Australia
- State: New South Wales
- City: Sydney
- LGA: Inner West Council
- Location: 8 km (5.0 mi) south of Sydney CBD

Government
  - State electorate: Heffron
  - Federal division: Grayndler

Area
  - Total: 0.27 km^{2} (0.10 sq mi)
- Elevation: 9 m (30 ft)

Population
  - Total: 1,100 (2021 census)
  - Density: 4,070/km^{2} (10,600/sq mi)
- Postcode: 2044
Suburbs around Sydenham
| Marrickville | Marrickville | St Peters |
| Marrickville | Sydenham | St Peters |
| Tempe | Tempe | St Peters |

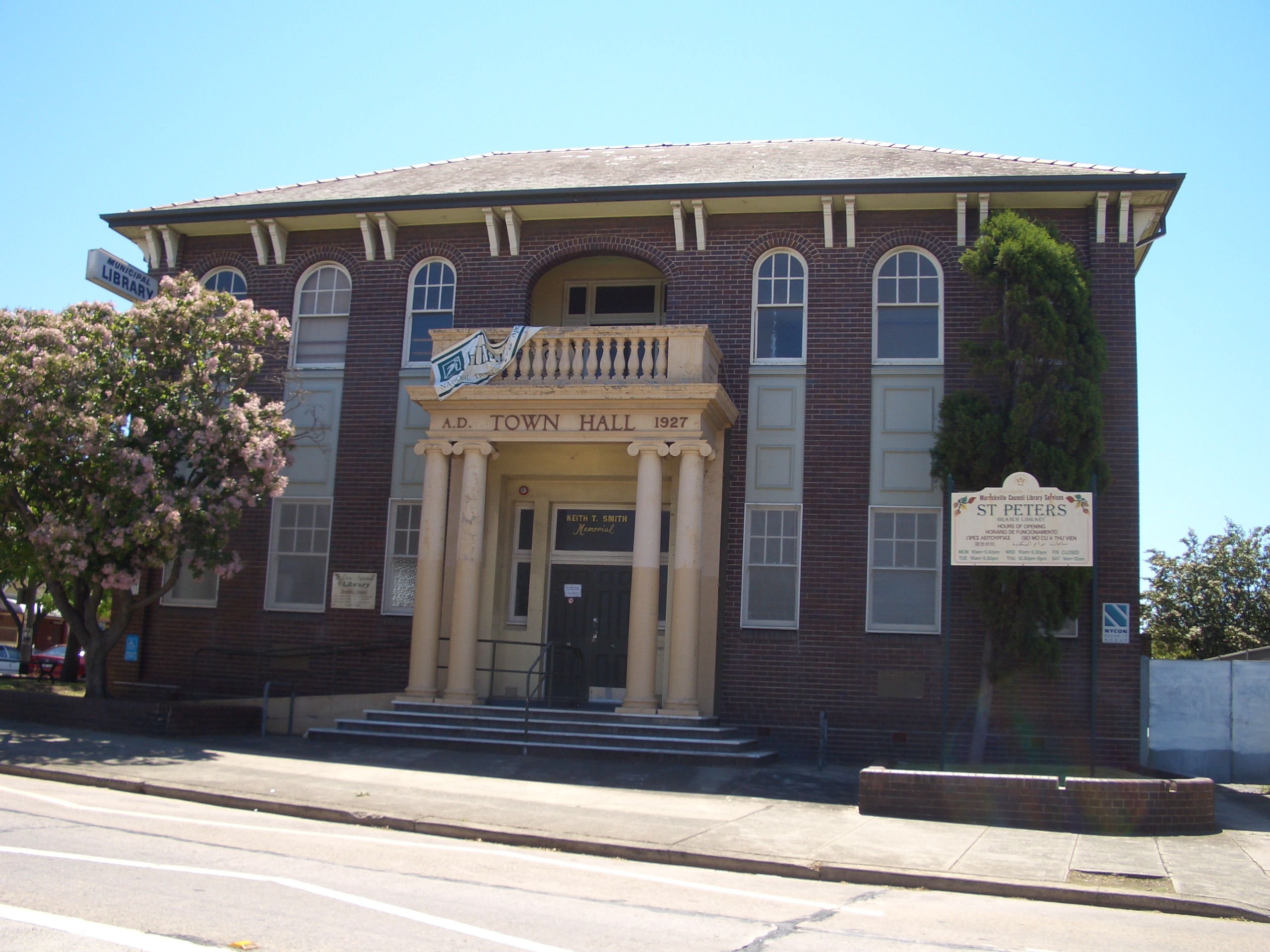
St Peters Town Hall

Sydenham is a suburb in the Inner West of Sydney, in the state of New South Wales, Australia. Sydenham is located 8 kilometres south of Sydney central business district and is part of the local government area of Inner West Council. Sydenham is surrounded by the suburbs of Marrickville, St Peters and Tempe.

== History ==
Sydenham developed after the Illawarra railway line came through the area to Hurstville in the late 1800s. It was named after Sydenham, a suburb of London, for their similarities in their close proximity to the city and a railway junction. The station was originally known as Marrickville when it opened on 15 October 1884. It was changed to Sydenham on 19 March 1895 when a new line was being built to Bankstown and the first station was to be called Marrickville. The post office opened in April 1899 as Tempe Park and was only renamed Sydenham in 1964.

Marrickville Council proposed the Sydenham Creative Hub—a commercial area of bars, cafes and galleries—near Sydenham Station sometime after 2011. On 12 December 2017, the Inner West Council voted to shrink the proposed precinct to an area immediately adjacent to the station only.

The aftermath of World War II saw Australia's post-war immigration boom. Many immigrants from Europe, particularly from Italy and Greece, settled in the inner suburbs of Sydney, including Sydenham. Demand for housing led to the development of new residencies, in the form of semi-detached houses, terraces, and apartments. The period also saw the stable development of industrial areas around Sydenham, with a number of factories, warehouses and manufacturing facilities, contributing to the working-class character of the suburb.

On 19 December 1953, a train collision occurred in Sydenham when a red rattler, travelling to Bankstown, rammed into a rear of another passenger train due to a signaling error. The crash resulted in the deaths of 5 railway passengers.

Sydenham has a number of heritage-listed sites, including Sydenham railway station.

== Population ==
In the 2021 Census, there were 1,100 people in Sydenham. 58.8% of people were born in Australia and 62.8% of people only spoke English at home. The most common responses for religion were No Religion 47.7%, Catholic 16.1%, Buddhism 8.9%, Eastern Orthodox 5.2% and Anglican 4.5%.

== Transport ==
Sydenham railway station is a junction for three lines on the Sydney Trains network: the Illawarra, Airport & South and Bankstown lines, and is served by Sydney Metro.

=== Former tram service ===
A cross country line connected the Cooks River Line and the Dulwich Hill line via Sydenham, operating along Railway Road and Sydenham Road in Sydenham.

== Features ==
Sydenham is a small suburb extending southeast from the railway station to the Princes Highway. It has a mixture of residential and industrial developments. A small group of shops is located around the intersection of Unwins Bridge Road and Railway Road, close to Sydenham railway station. In the adjacent suburb of Marrickville, commercial developments are also located along Sydenham and Marrickville Roads close to the border with Sydenham. Marrickville Metro Shopping Centre is also very close to Sydenham.

=== Sydenham Green ===
Sydenham is directly under the flight path of Sydney Airport. To deal with noise complaints from residential properties between Unwins Bridge Road and the Princes Highway, the government acquired these properties and converted them into a recreational park. The park occupies a large portion of the small suburb. Sydenham Green is located on either side of Railway Road, named after the park of the same name in Sydenham, London. Two heritage buildings along Railway Road were retained, a sandstone terrace house and St Mary's Church (which was later controversially demolished after a suspicious fire.) In the park, a series of oversized 'living room' sculptures – lamp, chairs and fireplace pays homage to the residential houses that formerly occupied the site.

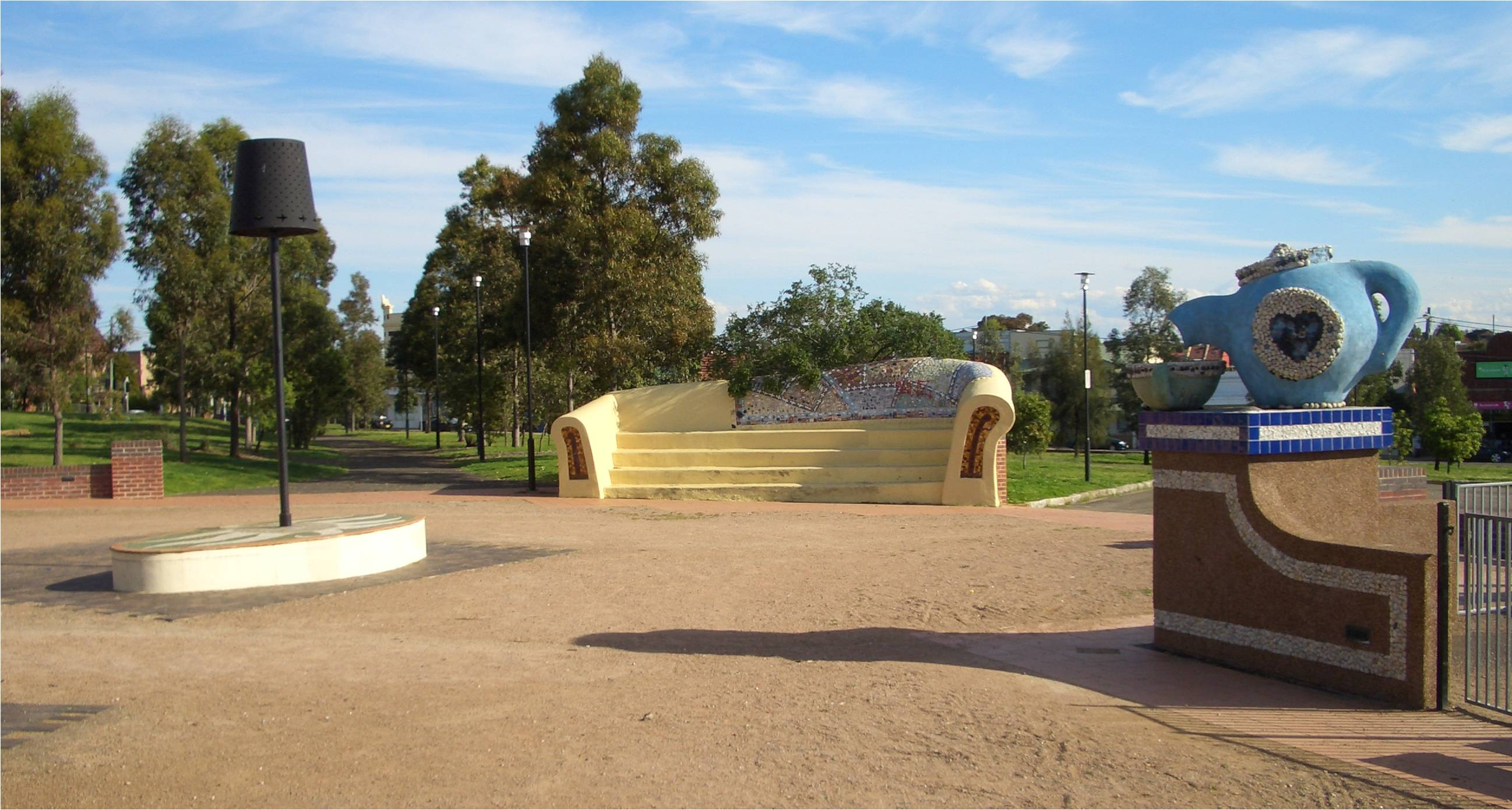

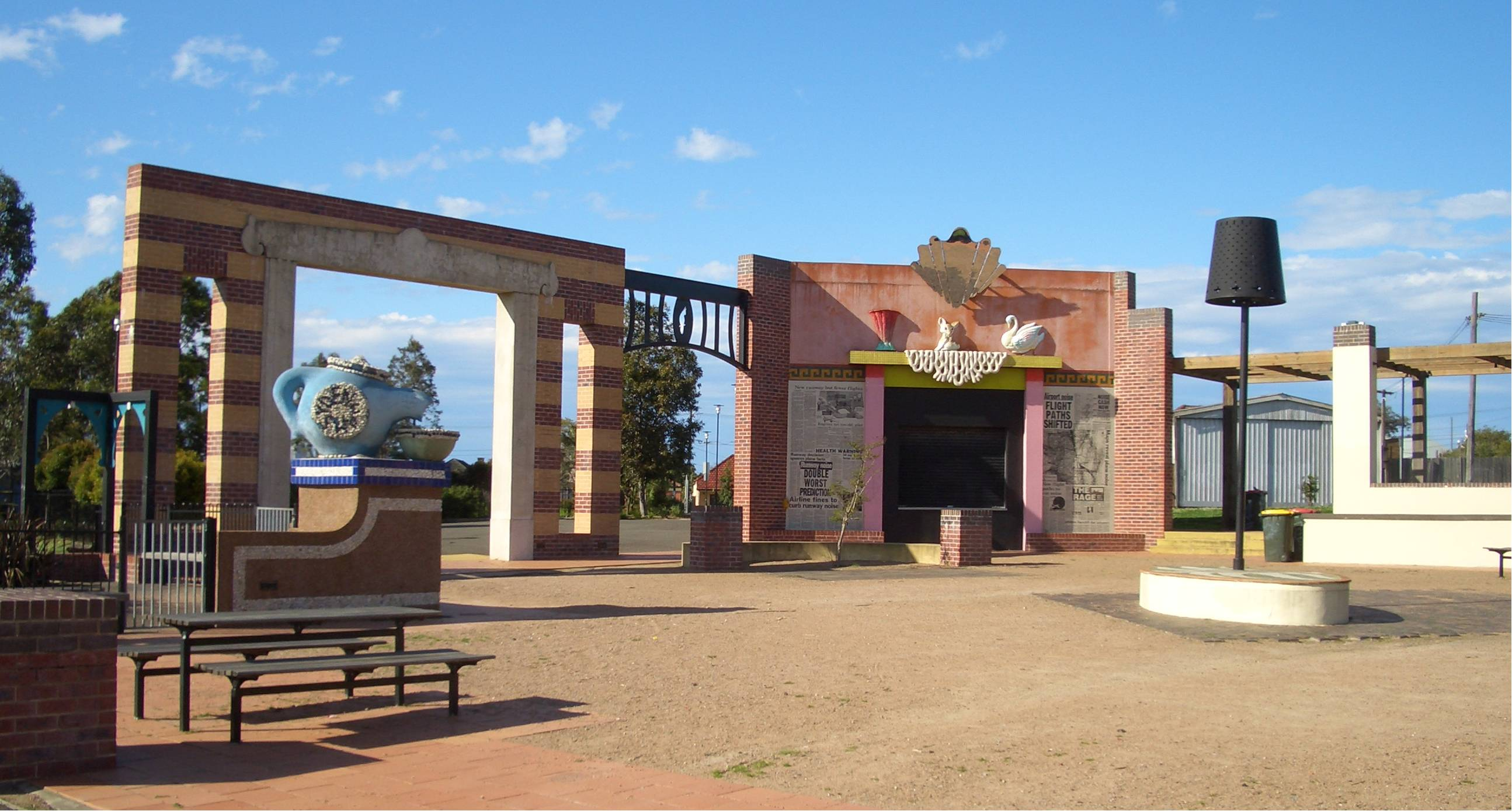

== Schools and Churches ==
Schools close to Sydenham are St Pius Catholic School, Enmore Road - Near Marrickville Metro, Tempe High School (Sydney) and Tempe Public School. St Mary's Church was the first Coptic Church outside Egypt, but was demolished in 2017.
