= William Proctor (Australian politician) =

Solicitor and politician in New South Wales, Australia

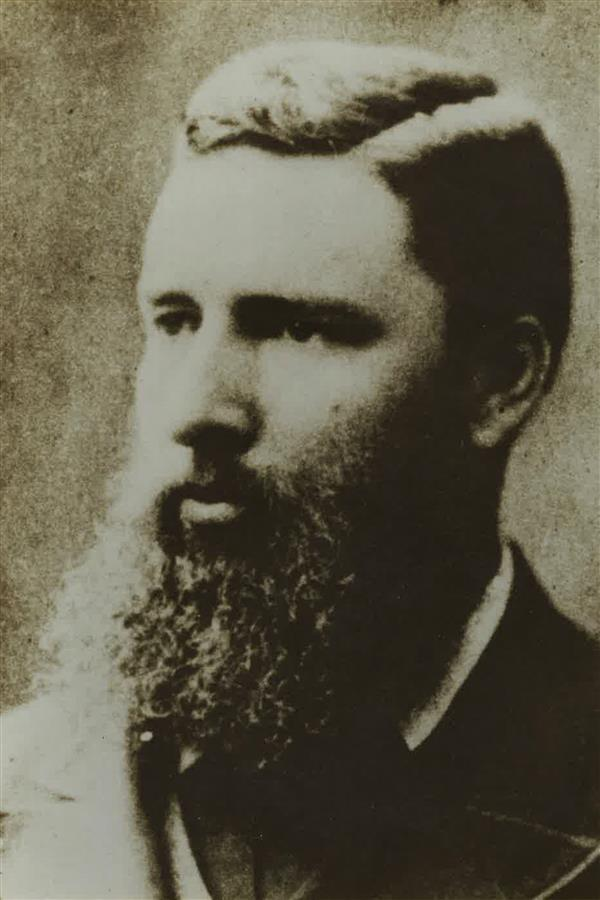
Proctor, c. 1880s

William Consett Proctor (1850 – 23 November 1905) was an English-born Australian solicitor and politician who was mayor of Armidale from 1877 to 1880 and a member of the New South Wales Legislative Assembly from 1880 to 1887. He was the father of artist Thea Proctor.

== Early life ==
He was born in Leicester to police constable John Proctor and Ellen Whelan. The family migrated to New South Wales around 1852. Proctor became a solicitor and settled at Armidale. On 30 November 1878 he married Kathleen Roberts, with whom he had two children, one of whom was the artist Thea Proctor. Proctor and Kathleen divorced in 1897, and he remarried Julia Cusack on 24 August 1903; they had four children.

== Political career ==
He was elected an alderman in the Municipality of Armidale in February 1876, elected mayor in February 1877, an office he held until February 1880.

In 1880, after finishing his term as mayor, Proctor left Armidale to practice as a solicitor in Sydney. At the election on 2 December 1880 he was elected to the New South Wales Legislative Assembly as one of two members for New England. He was re-elected at the 1882 and 1885 elections.

In December 1886 Proctor was found guilty by a jury of having sat and voted in parliament whilst he had an interest in a contract with the Government and the statutory penalty of £500 was imposed. Thomas Logan and David Proudfoot were partners in a contract for the construction of a section of the Illawarra railway. Proudfoot became insolvent which dissolved the partnership. Logan wanted to carry on the contract and sought Proctor's assistance to get him a bank guarantee. Proctor became one of Logan's guarantors, and wishing to protect himself took an assignment of the contract from Logan. At the time of taking the assignment Proctor was a member of the Legislative Assembly, and Proudfoot sought to recover the penalty of £500 because Proctor, being a member of the Legislative Assembly, had entered into a contract with the Government for or on account of the public service, within the meaning of s. 28 of the Constitution of New South Wales. Proceedings were stayed pending Proctor's appeal to the Full Court of the Supreme Court, however he resigned stating that he desired to have the verdict of his constituents.

The resulting by-election was held on 10 January 1887, which was at the emergence of political parties in New South Wales, where the division was on fiscal lines of free trade and protection. Proctor described himself as a fair trader. He opposed the Jennings ministry, which formed the Protectionist Party, but also opposed Sir Henry Parkes who would lead the Free Trade Party at the 1887 election. He was comfortably re-elected with a margin of 189 votes (12.9%). His return to parliament did not last long however as parliament was dissolved two weeks later and he did not stand as a candidate at the election on 10 February 1887.

Proctor's appeal to the Full Court of the Supreme Court was successful, which held that (1) Proctor did not receive any money that was payable under the contract and (2) the contract required the consent of the government. As that had not been given, Proctor had no rights against the government nor did the government have any rights against Proctor. The Full Court's view was that this was not a sufficient interest to disqualify Proctor from sitting and voting as a member. He was subsequently a Protectionist candidate for New England at the elections in 1889 and 1891 but was unsuccessful.

== Later life and death ==
By 1886 Proctor was a director of the Director of the Mercantile Building, Land and Investment Society and the Universal Land Building and Investment Society. He practiced for a while as a solicitor in Lismore, before returning to Sydney. It was his directorship of the Mercantile Land and Building Co (Limited) which resulted in his financial demise. (Note: It is unclear whether there was any relationship between the Mercantile Building, Land and Investment Society and the similarly named Mercantile Land and Building Co (Limited).) Proctor proposed that the company purchase land at Tennyson for James Farnell and voted in favour of the purchase. What he did not disclose to the company however was that he stood to gain £2,750 in commissions for the sale. In September 1890 the Company obtained judgment in the Supreme Court requiring him to repay that commission. Proctor's appeal to the Full Court of the Supreme Court was unsuccessful, and he was bankrupted on the company's petition in May 1891.

Proctor died in Ryde in 1905 (aged 55).

== See also ==
- Members of the New South Wales Legislative Assembly
- 1880–1882
- 1882–1885
- 1885–1887

== Notes ==
New South Wales Legislative Assembly
Preceded by Samuel Terry	Member for New England; 1880–1887; With: Copeland / Farnell / Inglis	Succeeded by Henry Copeland
Civic offices
Preceded by James E Salmon	Mayor of Armidale; 1877 – 1879	Succeeded by Alexander Richardson
