= Edward Clark (Australian politician) =

Australian politician (1854–1933)

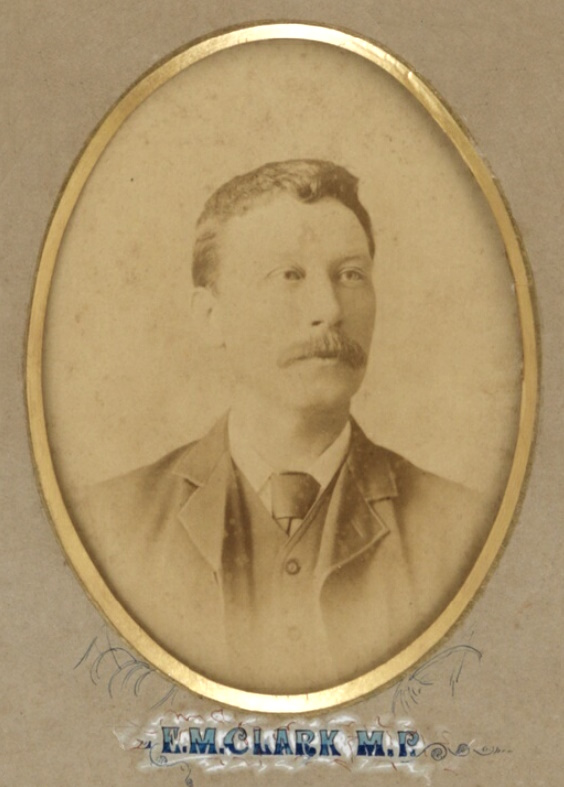

Deputy Mayor of North Sydney
- In office 1926
- Preceded by: Office established
- Succeeded by: Robert Charles Forsyth

Mayor of North Sydney
- In office 1918–1919
- Preceded by: William Anderson
- Succeeded by: Albert Ernest Whatmore

Member of the New South Wales Legislative Assembly
- In office 10 September 1907 – 14 September 1910
- Preceded by: Thomas Creswell
- Succeeded by: Arthur Cocks
- Constituency: St Leonards
- In office 24 July 1895 – 16 July 1904
- Preceded by: Henry Parkes
- Succeeded by: Thomas Creswell
- Constituency: St Leonards
- In office 30 November 1894 – 5 June 1895
- Preceded by: Joseph Cullen
- Succeeded by: George Howarth
- Constituency: Willoughby

Mayor of North Sydney
- In office 1892–1893
- Preceded by: Gerard Phillips
- Succeeded by: Alexander Macknight
- In office 17 June 1891 – 25 June 1894 Serving with Henry Parkes, Joseph Cullen
- Preceded by: John Fitzgerald Burns
- Succeeded by: Henry Parkes
- Constituency: St Leonards

Mayor of East St Leonards
- In office 1885–1886
- Preceded by: Nicholas McBurney
- Succeeded by: George Ranken

Personal details
- Born: Edward Mann Clark; 12 April 1854 Hobart, Tasmania
- Died: 30 May 1933 (aged 78) North Sydney, New South Wales, Australia
- Spouses: Margaret Jenkins (m. 1874; died 1926) Emma Eileen Kirby (m. 1926)
- Children: 7
- Nickname: E. M. Clark

Edward Mann Clark (12 April 1854 – 30 May 1933), often referred to as E. M. Clark, was an Australian politician. He was a North Sydney alderman for many years and served six terms as a member of the New South Wales Legislative Assembly in North Shore electorates. He was counted amongst the thirty-five Labor Electoral League members elected to parliament in 1891, but for most of his political career, Clark was identified with free trade fiscal beliefs, mostly as an independent and occasionally representing the Free Trade Party.

== Early life ==
Edward Arthur Mann Clark was born on 12 April 1854 at Hobart, Van Diemen's Land, the son of William and Selina Clark. Edward's father was a carpenter.

Young Edward was educated at Oldfield's Commercial Academy in Hobart.

Edward's father died in 1866, when he was aged twelve, after which the family moved to Sydney.

== Early career ==
Clark was first employed by N. Dawson, a watchmaker with business premises in Barrack Street, Sydney. He intended learning the watchmaking trade, but after Dawson's death he left and took a position with the timber merchants, Messrs. Goodlet and Smith, an established business with a steam saw and joinery mill at Darling Harbour and a head office at 483 George Street. For the remainder of his working life Clark was connected with the timber and building trade.

By 1878, Clark was working for the timber merchants, Miller and Harrison.

By July 1881, Clark was a partner of Clark and Priestman, timber merchants of the corner of Walker and Blue streets in North Sydney. In late November 1883, Clark's business partner, Edward Priestman, appeared before the Insolvency Court. After Priestman became insolvent, the partnership was terminated, and Clark took over the running of the business on his own account.

In 1884, Clark was elected as an alderman of the municipality of East St. Leonards. He was elected mayor in 1885.

In June 1885, Clark's timber business on Sydney's North Shore, E. M. Clark and Company, was the subject of insolvency proceedings and assigned to trustees. In about March 1886, Clark resigned as alderman of East St. Leonards, and a clearing sale of timber was held by the trustees. In November 1886 an allotment with a brick cottage fronting Arthur and Little Walker streets, St. Leonards, was sold in order to close the accounts "in the assigned estate of E. M. Clark".

Clark was re-elected as an alderman of the borough council of East St. Leonards in 1888. He was actively involved in the proposed amalgamation of the boroughs of East St. Leonards, St. Leonards and Victoria to form the municipality of North Sydney. After the amalgamation in July 1890 Clark was elected as an alderman of the North Sydney Council. He was an alderman of the North Sydney Council on a continuous basis from its incorporation in 1890 until 1928.

By 1891, Clark was the manager of a brick company.

== Political career ==
Clark's first attempt to win a seat in the New South Wales Legislative Assembly was at the October 1885 general election when he was a candidate for the two-member electorate of St. Leonards. The contest for the electorate was closely watched by the colonial press and the general public, with the premier George Dibbs being one of the sitting members. Dibbs had only recently become leader of the colonial government upon the resignation of Alexander Stuart (on the day parliament was dissolved). As well as Clark and Dibbs, the other candidates for the seat of St. Leonards was the veteran parliamentarian and prominent opposition politician, Henry Parkes, as well as the other sitting member Isaac Ives (who had won the seat in a by-election three months earlier). Parkes had been one of the members for Argyle prior to the election, elected in a by-election in late March 1885, but he chose to contest the St. Leonards electorate at the general election as a direct challenge to Dibbs. At the election held on 16 October 1885, Parkes topped the poll with 1,506 votes (33.4 percent) and Ives polled second to retain his seat. Dibbs was defeated with 23 percent of the vote, and Clark finished fourth with 18.2 percent.

Clark was urged by supporters to become a candidate at the 1887 general election. However, at that time the fiscal issue of free trade versus protectionism dominated the political discourse and Clark was asked by Henry Parkes, parliamentary leader of the emerging Free Trade Party, to retire from the contest in order that he and his colleague Isaac Ives might be returned unopposed.

Clark made a second attempt to win a seat in the Legislative Assembly at the 1889 general election, for which St. Leonards was allocated one extra seat making it a three-member electorate. Of the five candidates, four were identified as free trade candidates (including Clark), and the fifth was a protectionist. Isaac Ives had decided not to re-contest his seat and Parkes chose Joseph Cullen and John Fitzgerald Burns (previously the member for The Hunter) as the other two Free Trade Party candidates, leaving Clark to run as an independent candidate. Parkes and his two Free Trade Party colleagues were elected, with Clark polling fourth and again failing to be elected.

In September 1890 Clark was prominently involved in establishing a branch of the Single Tax League at North Sydney.

At the 1891 general election Parkes again chose Cullen and Burns as his fellow Free Trade Party candidates. They were opposed by Clark, one other independent free trade supporter and a protectionist. On this occasion, at the election held on 17 June 1891, Clark outpolled John F. Burns for the third seat, attracting 1,917 votes (18.4 percent). Although he had campaigned as an independent free trade candidate, Clark recognised that his election was "largely due to the vote of the working-men in his own neighbourhood". He had not contested as a nominee of the Labor Electoral League, but claimed he was "in thorough accord with the labor platform" and announced that he would "sit on the cross benches with the party", as a result of which Clark was considered to be one of the initial thirty-five elected Labor Electoral League candidates to win seats at the 1891 New South Wales election. Clark was one of a group of members of parliament who attended the fourth annual meeting of the Single Tax League of New South Wales, held in January 1892 in Sydney. He served a term as mayor of North Sydney from May to February 1893.

In September 1893 the Electoral Districts Commissioners presented their scheme of redistribution of seats under the new Electoral Act before the New South Wales Legislative Assembly. As part of the process, multi-member electorates were abolished and the electorates were realigned and in some cases renamed. The St. Leonards electorate was split into three separate constituencies, the original name being retained for one and the other two named Warringah and Willoughby.

Clark was one of the original trustees of the Kuring-gai Chase Trust, established in June 1894 to manage the Ku-ring-gai Chase National Park.

Even though E. M. Clark was considered to be one of the thirty-five Labor members elected to the Legislative Assembly in 1891, by the time of the 1894 general election he was not counted amongst their number, neither as a solidarity candidate adhering to the caucus pledge or as an independent Labor candidate. At the 1894 general election the election of the member for St. Leonards, now a single-member electorate, became a contest between Henry Parkes and Clark, both of whom had been sitting members. Parkes, representing the Free Trade Party, was opposed by three independent free trade candidates (including Clark) and a protectionist. At the election held on 14 July 1894, Parkes topped the poll with 1,028 votes (50.1 percent), with Clark in second place with 825 votes (40.8 percent). At the 1894 election Joseph Cullen won the seat of Willoughby for the Free Trade Party. However, four months later, in November 1894, he was required to resign his seat after filing for bankruptcy. Cullen immediately offered himself for re-election at the by-election which was held on 30 November 1894. He was opposed by three other candidates, two of whom, Clark and George Howarth, also represented the Free Trade Party. In a closely fought by-election Clark was elected to the seat, attracting 453 votes (39.5 percent).

The Free Trade Party under the leadership of George Reid dominated the New South Wales Legislative Assembly after the July 1894 election. However, after the party's legislative reform agenda was subjected to obstruction by the Legislative Council, Reid went to a general election a year later in an effort to strengthen his mandate for reform. Even though Henry Parkes was the sitting member and a member of the Free Trade Party, the party committee chose Edward Clark as the nominee for the St. Leonards electorate. Parkes was a political rival of George Reid and his influence within parliament and the Free Trade Party had begun to wane. Parkes reacted by opposing Reid in the Sydney-King electorate, where Reid was the sitting member. At the election Clark was returned as member for St. Leonards with 62.4 percent of the vote against one other candidate and Parkes was unsuccessful in his bid to unseat George Reid.

Clark held the St. Leonards seat for the following two general elections. In July 1898 he was opposed by a protectionist candidate, identified then as representing the National Federal Party, and two independent federalists, reflecting a focus on Federation as an election issue. Clark was elected with 63.5 percent of the vote on that occasion. With Federation the main political parties re-evaluated their priorities which was reflected in name changes, with the Protectionist Party becoming the Progressive Party and the Free Trade Party becoming the Liberal Reform Party. At the 1901 general election Clark was opposed in St. Leonards by two other candidates, one from the Labor Party and an independent liberal candidate, but was re-elected with 53.7 percent of the vote. For the 1904 general election Clark was not selected as the Liberal Reform Party candidate, with the party opting to select Thomas Creswell as their nominee. Clark was one of two independent liberal candidates, along with a Labor Party candidate and another classified as 'independent'. Creswell, the Liberal Reform candidate, won the seat at the election held in August 1904.

By the time of the September 1907 general election the party alliances in the Legislative Assembly were essentially reduced to the Liberal Reform Party led by the premier, Joseph Carruthers, and the Labor Electoral League under James McGowen. In 1907 Creswell, the sitting member for St. Leonards, was not endorsed by the Liberal Reform Party, who instead chose John Carter as their nominee. Clark, along with Creswell and one other, contested the election as independents against Carter and a Labor candidate. In a close contest, Clark topped the poll with 37 percent of the vote and returned to parliament as, once again, the member for St. Leonards.

Clark's victory against the selected Liberal Reform candidate in 1907 caused divisions within local party branches as they prepared for the 1910 general election. Amid disagreements as to whether to nominate a candidate against Clark, eventually Arthur Cocks was chosen as the Liberal Reform nominee. The election was held in October 1910 between Clark, Cocks and a Labor candidate, resulting in Clark being defeated, polling third with 23.6 percent of the vote.

After his defeat in 1910 Edward Clark made five further attempts to re-enter the New South Wales Legislative Assembly during the period 1913 to 1932, contesting elections in the Willoughby electorate and the North Shore and North Sydney electorates. At each unsuccessful attempt his poll numbers were moderate to low.

From March 1918 to March 1919 Clark served his second term of mayor of North Sydney, having been an alderman on the council since its incorporation in 1890.

== Personal life ==
Edward M. Clark and Margaret ('Maggie') Herbertson Jenkins were married on 24 January 1874 at the residence of the bride's parents in Elizabeth Street, Sydney. The couple had 7 children born from 1876 to 1884.

By 1880 Edward Clark and his family were living at St. Leonards on Sydney's North Shore.

In 1926 Edward and Margaret Clark were living in Ridge Street, North Sydney. Margaret Clark died on 20 April 1926 and was buried in the Methodist cemetery at Gore Hill.

On 6 August 1926 Edward M. Clark and Emma Eileen Kirby were married.

== Later life and death ==
Clark was actively associated with the movements for the establishment of the Taronga Park Zoo (opened in 1916) and the Northern Suburbs cemetery (opened in 1922).

Edward Mann Clark died on 30 May 1933 at his residence in Laycock Street, Neutral Bay, aged 72.

New South Wales Legislative Assembly
Preceded by John Fitzgerald Burns	Member for St Leonards; 1891 – 1894; Served alongside: Parkes, Cullen	Succeeded by Henry Parkes
Preceded by Joseph Cullen	Member for Willoughby; 1894 – 1895	Succeeded by George Howarth
Preceded by Henry Parkes	Member for St Leonards; 1895 – 1904	Succeeded by Thomas Creswell
Preceded by Thomas Creswell	Member for St Leonards; 1907 – 1910	Succeeded by Arthur Cocks
Civic offices
Preceded by Nicholas McBurney	Mayor of East St Leonards; 1885 – 1886	Succeeded by George Ranken
Preceded by Gerard Phillips	Mayor of North Sydney; 1892 – 1893	Succeeded by Alexander Macknight
Preceded by William Anderson	Mayor of North Sydney; 1918 – 1919	Succeeded by Albert Ernest Whatmore
New title	Deputy Mayor of North Sydney; 1926	Succeeded by Robert Charles Forsyth
