= Theophilus Cooper (politician) =

Australian politician

Theophilus Cooper (17 July 1827 – 17 February 1912) was a politician in New South Wales, a member of the New South Wales Legislative Assembly.

Cooper was born in Surrey, England, and arrived in New South Wales on board the 'Sir Thomas Munro' on 18 February 1833.

Cooper was elected to the seat of New England on 24 December 1864, a position he held until 15 November 1869. He did not contest the 1869 election.

He died in Mosman on 17 February 1912 (aged 84).

New South Wales Legislative Assembly
Preceded by Robert Forster	Member for New England; 1864–1869	Succeeded by Charles Weaver
