= Henry Copeland (politician) =

Australian politician (1839–1904)

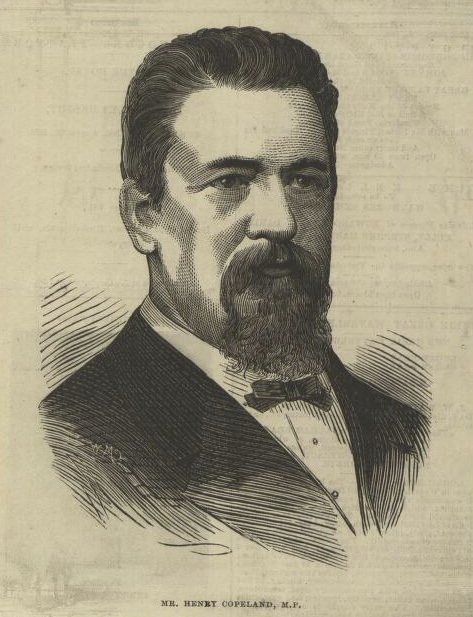

Agent-General for New South Wales
- In office 14 May 1900 – 18 July 1903
- Preceded by: Julian Salomons
- Succeeded by: Lord Jersey

Personal details
- Born: 6 June 1839 Kingston upon Hull, England
- Died: 22 June 1904 (aged 65) London, England
- Spouse(s): Hannah Beecroft (m. 1863; died 1879) Mary Beecroft (m. 1880)
- Occupation: Businessman; Politician

Henry Copeland (6 June 1839 – 22 June 1904) was a member of the New South Wales Legislative Assembly.

Copeland was born in Hull, Yorkshire, England. Aged 18 years, he arrived in Williamstown, Victoria and spent around 15 years on the goldfields as a digger, farmer and contractor. In 1863 he visited England where he married Hannah née Beecroft on 20 April. He would later marry her sister Mary and had 4 sons and 7 daughters from both marriages. He moved to New South Wales in 1872.

Copeland was elected unopposed to the New South Wales Mining Board in 1874. He entered the New South Wales Legislative Assembly and represented six different seats between 1877 and 1900.

He was briefly Secretary for Public Works in the Stuart ministry appointed in January 1883, defeated in the resulting ministerial by-election and was returned to the assembly at the East Sydney by-election held the following week, before resigning from the ministry in March 1883 following a speech he made, whilst intoxicated, at the St Patrick's day banquet. He was Secretary for Lands in the Jennings ministry from February 1886 to January 1887. In October 1891, when the third Dibbs ministry Government was formed, he was again appointed Secretary for Lands from October 1891 until August 1894.

He was appointed Agent-General for New South Wales in London in May 1900, serving until 18 July 1903.

Copeland died in Twickenham, London, England on 22 June 1904 (aged 65).

His brother was the Rev. G.D. Copeland of St Stephen's, London.

Parliament of New South Wales
Political offices
| Preceded by John Lackey | Secretary for Public Works; January – March 1883 | Succeeded by Francis Wright |
| Preceded by Gerald Spring | Secretary for Lands; 1886 – 1887 | Succeeded by Thomas Garrett |
| Preceded by James Brunker | Secretary for Lands; 1891 – 1894 | Succeeded by Joseph Carruthers |
New South Wales Legislative Assembly
| Preceded by Robert Forster | Member for Goldfields North; 1877 – 1880 | Abolished |
| Preceded by Samuel Terry | Member for New England; 1880 – 1882; With: William Proctor | Succeeded by James Farnell |
| Preceded by William Foster; Joseph Mitchell | Member for Newtown; 1882 – 1883; With: Frederick Gibbes | Succeeded by Joseph Mitchell |
| Preceded by John McElhone | Member for East Sydney; 1883 – 1887; With: Edmund Barton; George Griffiths / George Reid; George Reid / Sydney Burdekin | Succeeded by William McMillan; John Street |
| Preceded by William Proctor | Member for New England; 1887 – 1894; With: James Inglis none / Edmund Lonsdale | Abolished |
| New district | Member for Armidale; 1894 – 1895 | Succeeded by Edmund Lonsdale |
| Preceded by Richard Meagher | Member for Sydney-Phillip; 1895 – 1900 | Succeeded by Daniel O'Connor |
Diplomatic posts
| Preceded by Sir Julian Salomons | Agent-General for New South Wales; 1900 – 1903 | Succeeded by The Earl of Jersey |
