= Edward Sayers (politician) =

English-born Australian politician

Edward Mawney Sayers (1818 – 7 December 1909) was an English-born Australian politician.

He was born in Essex, and migrated to Van Diemen's Land in 1834. He later moved to Melbourne, where he married his first wife Anna in 1838; they had three children. On 4 March 1842, while working as a merchant, he was declared insolvent and moved to Sydney. On 22 November 1844 he married Mary Ann Hayman; they had seven children. In Sydney he acquired a number of coastal trading vessels and pioneered the Sydney to Melbourne shipping line. In 1859 he was elected to the New South Wales Legislative Assembly for St Leonards, but he did not re-contest in 1860. He retired around 1890, and around 1893 married his third and final wife, Edith Hayles. Sayers died at Mosman in 1909 (aged 91).

New South Wales Legislative Assembly
| New district | Member for St Leonards; 1859–1860 | Succeeded by James Farnell |
