= George Markham (Australian politician) =

Irish-born Australian politician

George Markham (1822 – 2 February 1864) was an Irish-born Australian politician.

He was born in County Cork to British captain John Markham. He migrated to Australia in the 1840s and became an auctioneer at Armidale. On 5 March 1854 he married Susan Allingham, with whom he had five children. In 1860 he was elected to the New South Wales Legislative Assembly for New England. He retired in 1862, to be appointed superintendent for the southern district in the establishment of the Police Force, based at Cooma.

In January 1864 he was cleaning or loading his revolver in his residence when it discharged and he was fatally wounded, dying aged 41–42 and leaving a widow and five young children.

New South Wales Legislative Assembly
Preceded by James Hart	Member for New England; 1860–1862	Succeeded by Robert Forster
