= Charles Weaver (Australian politician) =

English-born Australian politician

Charles Thomas Weaver (1817 – 2 June 1874) was an English-born Australian politician.

He was born in Gloucester to pin manufacturer Charles Weaver and Maria Paten. He migrated to Australia around 1838. On 11 October 1854 he married Jacoba Henrietta Maria Johanna de Moulin, with whom he had eight children. He was a police magistrate at Armidale both before and after his political career. In 1869 he was elected to the New South Wales Legislative Assembly for New England, but he resigned in 1871. Weaver died at Armidale in 1874.

New South Wales Legislative Assembly
Preceded by Theophilus Cooper	Member for New England; 1869–1871	Succeeded by Samuel Terry
