= William Judd (Australian politician) =

Australian politician

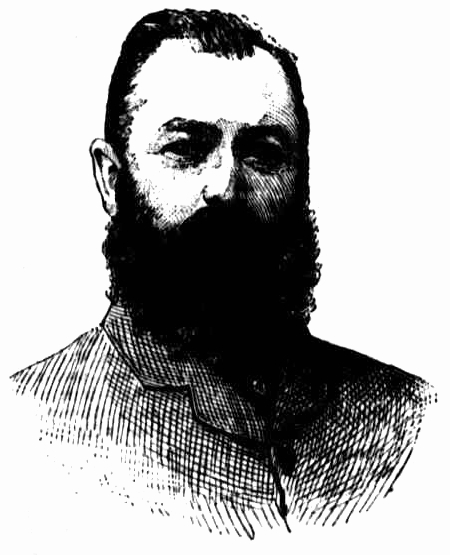
William George Judd c.1887

William George Judd (1847 – 6 December 1929) was an Australian politician.

Known as George Judd, he was born in Sydney to labourer James Judd and Selina Matthews. He ran a store at St Peters before entering politics, and also ran a brick and tile company. On 15 February 1869 he married Eleanor Eliza Howard, with whom he had four children. In 1885 he was elected to the New South Wales Legislative Assembly for Canterbury, but he did not re-contest in 1887. In 1906, he was elected as the first president of Sutherland Shire, a position which he held until 1910. Judd died at Arncliffe in 1929 and was buried at Woronora Memorial Park.

His name is associated with Judd's Hurstville Brickworks.

Civic offices
Preceded by John Gorus	Mayor of St Peters; 1877–1878	Succeeded by Thomas McCauley
Preceded by Thomas McCauley	Mayor of St Peters; 1878–1881	Succeeded by Samuel Terry
Preceded by Samuel Terry	Mayor of St Peters; 1883–1884	Succeeded by William Edwards
New creation	President of Sutherland Shire; 1906-1910	Succeeded by E. W. Hyndman
New South Wales Legislative Assembly
New district	Member for Canterbury; 1885–1887; With: Mark Hammond; William Henson; Septimus Stephen	Succeeded by Joseph Carruthers; William Davis; Alexander Hutchison
