= Robert Forster (Australian politician) =

Australian politician (1818–1880)

Robert Henry Mariner Forster (1818 – 2 February 1880) was an Australian politician.

He was born at sea near Corfu to Henry and Margaret Forster; his father would later serve as governor of Goulburn Gaol. He arrived in Australia around 1836 and became a solicitor, based ar Armidale. On 9 September 1847 he married Maria Ann Morris, with whom he had seven children. In 1862 he was elected to the New South Wales Legislative Assembly for New England, but he was defeated in 1864. He returned in 1870 as the member for Goldfields North; he was defeated in 1872, re-elected in 1875 and defeated again in 1877. Forster died at Greenwich in 1880.

New South Wales Legislative Assembly
Preceded by George Markham	Member for New England; 1862–1864	Succeeded by Theophilus Cooper
Preceded by Robert Wisdom	Member for Goldfields North; 1870–1872	Succeeded by James Rodd
Preceded by James Rodd	Member for Goldfields North; 1875–1877	Succeeded by Henry Copeland
