= Isaac Shepherd =

Australian politician

Isaac Shepherd (1800 – 11 December 1877) was an Australian politician.

He was born at Ryde to farmers James and Ann Shepherd. On 4 December 1832 he married Ann Payne, with whom he had ten children; a second marriage on 16 March 1875 to Matilda Mary Ridley was childless. A pastoralist, he held extensive land on the Murrumbidgee River. In 1860 he was elected to the New South Wales Legislative Assembly for St Leonards, but he retired in 1864. Shepherd died at Ryde in 1877.

New South Wales Legislative Assembly
Preceded by James Farnell	Member for St Leonards; 1860–1864	Succeeded by William Tunks
