= Samuel Terry (politician) =

Australian politician

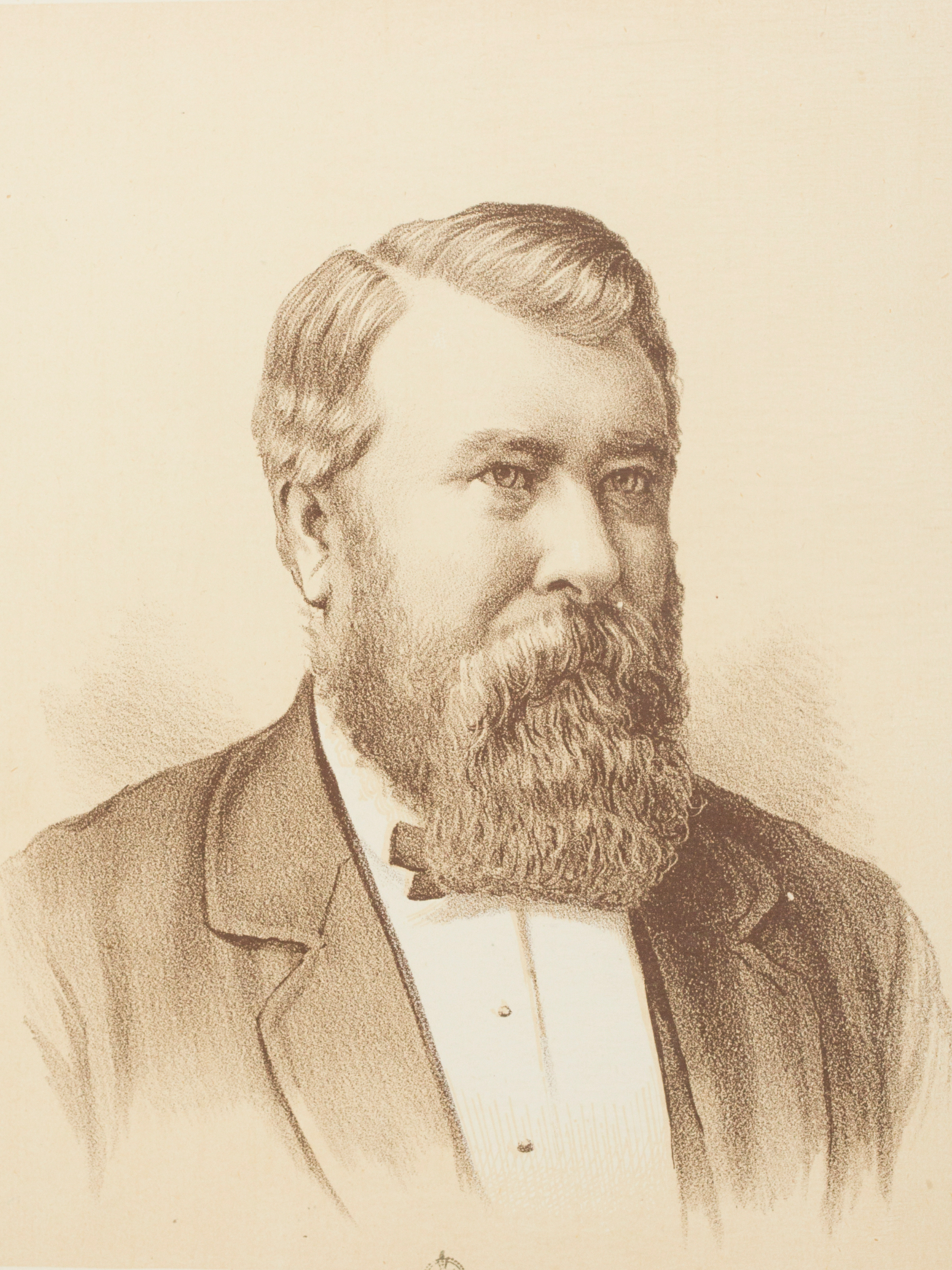
Samuel Henry Terry, MLC

Samuel Henry Terry (9 April 1833 – 21 September 1887) was an Australian politician.

He was born at Box Hill to landowner John Terry and Eleanor Rouse. He entered a counting house at a young age to learn business, but in 1842 inherited his father's property at Box Hill, in addition to 5,000 acres on the Yass Plains. He bought up extensive suburban real estate in Sydney and also owned property in Queensland and New Zealand. On 13 May 1856 he married Clementina Parker Want, with whom he had two children; a second marriage on 12 September 1863 to Jane Weaver produced a further three children. In 1859 he was elected to the New South Wales Legislative Assembly for Mudgee. He served until he was defeated in 1869 by Henry Stephen , but he was returned for New England in 1871. He served until he resigned in 1881 (having transferred back to Mudgee in 1880), and in 1882 he was appointed to the New South Wales Legislative Council, where he served until his death at Ashfield in 1887.

== See also ==
- Hunting Lodge, Rouse Hill

New South Wales Legislative Assembly
Preceded by Lyttleton Bayley	Member for Mudgee; 1859–1869	Succeeded by Henry Stephen
Preceded by Charles Weaver	Member for New England; 1871–1880	Succeeded by Henry Copeland; William Proctor
Preceded by David Buchanan	Member for Mudgee; 1880–1881; Served alongside: Beyers, Buchanan	Succeeded by John Robertson
Civic offices
Preceded by William Judd	Mayor of St Peters; 1881–1882	Succeeded by George Tucker
Preceded by George Tucker	Mayor of St Peters; 1882–1883	Succeeded by William Judd
