= James Farnell =

Australian politician (1825–1888)

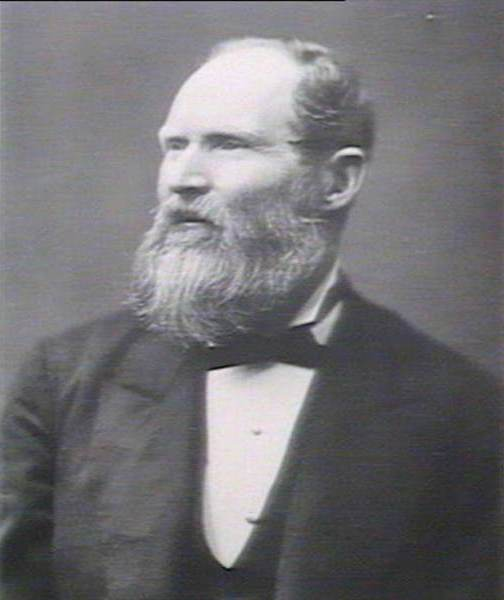

8th Premier of New South Wales
- In office 18 December 1877 – 20 December 1878
- Governor: Sir Hercules Robinson
- Preceded by: John Robertson
- Succeeded by: Henry Parkes

Personal details
- Born: James Squire Farnell; 25 June 1825 St Leonards, New South Wales
- Died: 21 August 1888 (aged 63) Petersham, New South Wales
- Spouse: Margaret O'Donnell (m. 1853)
- Children: Frank Farnell

James Squire Farnell (25 June 1825 – 21 August 1888) was an Australian politician and Premier of New South Wales.

== Early years ==
Farnell was born in St Leonards, New South Wales, son of Thomas Charles Farnell, a brewer, and Mary Ann Farnell, daughter of James Squire, an English Romanichal, who arrived on the First Fleet and may have been Australia's first brewer. He was educated at Parramatta. He visited America and New Zealand during the California Gold Rush in 1849.

== Political career ==
In 1860, Farnell won the by-election for the Legislative Assembly seat of St Leonards, but was defeated at the next election for the seat of Central Cumberland. In 1864 he won the seat of Parramatta, which he held for the next 10 years. He was Secretary for Lands between May 1872 and February 1875. He also spent time as Secretary for Mines. He was defeated for 1874 election for Parramatta, but was returned to parliament election for St Leonards held 11 days later, serving until 1882.

=== Premier ===
Farnell became premier on 18 December 1877 and took office as the first Australian-born Premier, choosing the portfolio of Secretary for Lands. Farnell resigned in October 1878 and was succeeded by the third Parkes ministry.

=== Subsequent career ===
Farnell was unsuccessful in his candidacy for Parramatta at the 1882 election, but was returned to parliament at the election for New England held 2 weeks later. From 1882 to 1885, he represented New England. In January 1883, Farnell again became Secretary for Lands. He then became Minister of Justice and Representative of the Government in the Legislative Council in October 1885, having been appointed to the Legislative Council on the same day, but resigned from the ministry 2 days later. In 1887, he resigned from the Legislative Council to successfully contest Redfern as a Free Trade candidate at the election on 5 February and represented that constituency until his death.

He died in Petersham. His son Frank Farnell was a member of the Legislative Assembly for Central Cumberland.

== Honours ==
Farnell declined a knighthood.

Farnell was Grand Master of the Grand Lodge of New South Wales, installed on 3 December 1877.

Parliament of New South Wales
Political offices
Preceded by John Robertson	Premier of New South Wales; 1877 – 1878	Succeeded by Henry Parkes
Preceded by Bowie Wilson	Secretary for Lands; 1872 – 1875	Succeeded by Thomas Garrett
New office	Secretary for Mines; May – July 1874	Succeeded by Robert Abbott
Preceded by Ezekiel Baker	Secretary for Lands; 1877 – 1878	Succeeded by James Hoskins
Preceded by John Robertson	Secretary for Lands; 1883 – 1885	Succeeded by Joseph Abbott
Preceded by Henry Cohen as Minister of Justice	Minister of Justice Representative of the Government in the Legislative Council; 7 – 9 October 1885	Succeeded by Thomas Slattery as Minister of Justice
Preceded by William Dalley as Representative of the Government	Minister of Justice Representative of the Government in the Legislative Council; 7 – 9 October 1885	Succeeded by George Thornton as Representative of the Government
New South Wales Legislative Assembly
Preceded by Edward Sayers	Member for St Leonards; May – November 1860	Succeeded by Isaac Shepherd
Preceded by John Lackey	Member for Parramatta; 1864 – 1874; With: James Byrnes / Hugh Taylor	Succeeded by Charles Byrnes
Preceded by William Tunks	Member for St Leonards; 1874 – 1882	Succeeded by George Dibbs; Bernhardt Holtermann
Preceded by Henry Copeland	Member for New England; 1882 – 1885; With: William Proctor	Succeeded by James Inglis
Preceded by Arthur Renwick; John Sutherland; Thomas Williamson	Member for Redfern; 1887 – 1888; With: William Schey; William Stephen; John Sutherland	Succeeded by James Howe
