= Electoral district of St Leonards =

State electoral district of New South Wales, Australia

St Leonards was an electoral district of the Legislative Assembly in the Australian state of New South Wales, created in 1859, partly replacing Sydney Hamlets, and named after the Sydney suburb of St Leonards, which then included North Sydney, its main settlement. It extended from North Sydney to Broken Bay, including the Northern Beaches. It elected one member from 1859 to 1882, two members from 1882 to 1889 and three members from 1889 to 1894. With the abolition of multi-member constituencies in 1894, it was replaced by the single-member electorates of St Leonards, Warringah and Willoughby. In 1920, with the introduction of proportional representation, it was absorbed into North Shore.

== Members for St Leonards ==
Single-member (1859–1882)
Member	Party	Term						
Edward Sayers	None	1859–1860						
James Farnell	None	1860–1860						
Isaac Shepherd	None	1860–1864						
William Tunks	None	1864–1874						
James Farnell	None	1874–1882						
Two members (1882–1889)
Member	Party	Term	Member	Party	Term			
George Dibbs	None	1882–1885	Bernhardt Holtermann	None	1882–1885			
Henry Parkes	None	1885–1887	Isaac Ives	None	1885–1887			
Henry Parkes	Free Trade	1887–1889	Isaac Ives	Free Trade	1887–1889			
Three members (1889–1894)
Member	Party	Term	Member	Party	Term	Member	Party	Term
Henry Parkes	Free Trade	1889–1894	Joseph Cullen	Free Trade	1889–1894	John Burns	Free Trade	1889–1891
Henry Parkes	Free Trade	1889–1894	Joseph Cullen	Free Trade	1889–1894	Edward Clark	Labour	1891–1894
Single-member (1894–1920)
Member	Party	Term						
Henry Parkes	Free Trade	1894–1895						
Edward Clark	Free Trade	1895–1901						
Edward Clark	Liberal Reform	1901–1904						
Thomas Creswell	Liberal Reform	1904–1907						
Edward Clark	Independent	1907–1910						
Arthur Cocks	Liberal Reform	1910–1917						
Arthur Cocks	Nationalist	1917–1920						

== Election results ==
1917 New South Wales state election: St Leonards
Party	Candidate	Votes	%	±%
Nationalist	Arthur Cocks	3,992	65.5	+11.4
Labor	Robert Edwards	2,052	33.7	−10.0
Independent	Frederick Clancy	53	0.9	+0.9
Total formal votes		6,097	98.7	+1.6
Informal votes		80	1.3	−1.6
Turnout		6,177	51.4	−11.6
Nationalist hold		Swing	+11.4	
