= Electoral district of New England =

Former state electoral district of New South Wales, Australia

New England New South Wales—Legislative Assembly
- State: New South Wales
- Created: 1859
- Abolished: 1894
- Demographic: Rural

New England was an electoral district of the Legislative Assembly in the then colony of New South Wales.

Initially created in 1859 in the New England region of northern New South Wales, it partly replaced the Electoral district of New England and Macleay.

Originally electing one member, New England elected two members from 1880 to 1891 and three members from 1891 to 1894. With the introduction of single-member electorates in 1894, New England was replaced by Armidale, Uralla-Walcha and Bingara.

== Members for New England ==
Single-member (1859–1880)
Member	Party	Term						
James Hart	None	1859–1860						
George Markham	None	1860–1862						
Robert Forster	None	1862–1864						
Theophilus Cooper	None	1864–1869						
Charles Weaver	None	1869–1871						
Samuel Terry	None	1871–1880						
Two members (1880–1891)
Member	Party	Term	Member	Party	Term			
Henry Copeland	None	1880–1882	William Proctor	None	1880–1887			
James Farnell	None	1882–1885	William Proctor	None	1880–1887			
James Inglis	None	1885–1887	William Proctor	None	1880–1887			
James Inglis	Free Trade	1887–1891	Henry Copeland	Protectionist	1887–1891			
Three members (1891–1894)
Member	Party	Term	Member	Party	Term	Member	Party	Term
James Inglis	Free Trade	1891–1894	Henry Copeland	Protectionist	1891–1894	Edmund Lonsdale	Free Trade	1891–1894

== Election results ==
1891 New South Wales colonial election: New England Thursday 25 June
Party	Candidate	Votes	%	±%
Free Trade	James Inglis (re-elected 1)	1,731	19.5	
Protectionist	Henry Copeland (re-elected 2)	1,563	17.6	
Free Trade	Edmund Lonsdale (elected 3)	1,544	17.4	
Protectionist	Charles Wilson	1,399	15.7	
Free Trade	George Meallin	1,353	15.2	
Protectionist	William Proctor	1,311	14.7	
Total formal votes		8,901	99.5	
Informal votes		42	0.5	
Turnout		3,247	60.8	
Free Trade hold 1, win 1		(1 new seat)		
Protectionist hold 1		(1 new seat)		
