= Members of the New South Wales Legislative Council, 1864–1869 =

Members of the New South Wales Legislative Council who served from 1864 to 1869 were appointed for life by the Governor on the advice of the Premier. This list includes members between the beginning of the 1864–65 colonial election on 22 November 1864 and the beginning of the 1869–70 colonial election on 3 December 1869. The President was Sir Terence Murray.

Name	Years in office	Office
George Allen	1856–1861, 1861–1877	Chairman of Committees
John Blaxland	1863–1884	
William Busby (Note: William Busby was appointed on 1 July 1867, and took his seat on 2 July 1867.)	1867–1887	
William Byrnes	1858–1861, 1861–1891	
Alexander Campbell	1864–1890	
John Campbell	1856, 1861–1886	
James Chisholm (Note: James Chisholm was appointed on 17 October 1864, but did not take his seat until 27 January 1865.)	1865–1888	
Edward Cox (Note: Edward Cox and James Macarthur were appointed on 5 June 1866, and took their seats on 24 July 1866.) (Note: Edward Cox died on 18 May 1868.)	1866–1868	
George Cox	1863–1901	
Frederick Darley (Note: 5 Members were appointed on 28 September 1868, and took their seats on 13 October 1868.)	1868–1886	
Joseph Docker	1856–1861, 1863–1884	Representative of the Government (22 January 1866 – 26 October 1868)
Robert Fitzgerald (Note: Robert Fitzgerald died on 9 May 1865.)	1856–1861, 1861–1865	
Samuel Gordon	1861–1882	
John Hargrave (Note: John Hargrave resigned on 23 June 1865 having been appointed a Judge of the Supreme court.)	1859–1861, 1861–1865	Representative of the Government (3 February 1865 – 21 January 1866)
John Hay (Note: John Hay was appointed on 26 June 1867, and took his seat on 2 July 1867.)	1867–1892	
Thomas Holt	1868–1883	
Thomas Icely	1843–1853; 1855–1856; 1864–1874	
Patrick Jennings (Note: Patrick Jennings was appointed on 28 March 1867, and took his seat on 31 July 1867.)	1867–1869, 1890–1897	
Robert Johnson (Note: Robert Johnson died on 6 November 1866.)	1856–1861, 1863–1866	
Edward Lloyd (Note: Edward Lloyd resigned on 10 May 1865.)	1863–1865	
Francis Lord	1856–1861, 1864–1893	
James Macarthur (Note: James Macarthur died on 21 April 1867.)	1866–1867	
Sir William Macarthur	1864–1882	
John MacFarlane	1858–1861, 1861–1870	
Sir William Manning (Note: While Sir William Manning was Attorney General he refused to sit in the cabinet or represent the government in the Council.)	1861–1876, 1888–1895	Attorney General (21 October 1868 - 15 December 1870)
Alexander McArthur (Note: The seats of Alexander McArthur, Francis Merewether and William Russell were declared vacant due to absence on 24 October 1865.)	1861–1865	
Francis Merewether	1856–1861, 1861–1865	
James Mitchell (Note: James Mitchell died on 1 February 1869.)	1856–1861, 1861–1869	
Henry Moore	1868–1888	
Sir Terence Murray	1862–1873	President
Edward Ogilvie	1863–1889	
Robert Owen (Note: Robert Owen was appointed on 8 December 1868, and took his seat the same day.)	1868–1878	Representative of the Government (27 October 1868 – 1 August 1870)
Alexander Park	1858–1861, 1868–1873	
John Plunkett (Note: John Plunkett died on 9 May 1869.)	1857–1858, 1861–1869	Representative of the Government (23 November 1863 – 2 February 1865)
John Richardson	1868–1887	
Bourn Russell	1858–1861, 1861–1880	
William Russell	1861–1865	
Alexander Scott (Note: Alexander Scott resigned on 1 May 1866.)	1862–1866	
Sir Edward Deas Thomson	1856–1861, 1861–1879	
Robert Towns	1856–1861, 1863–1873	
William Walker (Note: resigned on 25 April 1867 departing permanently for England.)	1863–1867	
Hugh Wallace (Note: Hugh Wallace was appointed on 5 June 1866, and took his seat on 16 August 1866.) (Note: Hugh Wallace died on 7 June 1868.)	1866–1868	
Edward Ward (Note: Edward Ward resigned on 12 April 1865.)	1861–1865	
John Watt (Note: John Watt resigned on 9 April 1866 to leave for England.)	1861–1866, 1874–1890	
Elias Weekes (Note: Elias Weekes was appointed on 11 July 1865, and took his seat on 24 October 1865.)	1865–1880	

== See also ==
- First Martin ministry (1873–1865)
- Fourth Cowper ministry (1865–1866)
- Second Martin ministry (1866–1868)
- Second Robertson ministry (1868–1870)
