= Members of the New South Wales Legislative Council, 1861–1864 =

Members of the New South Wales Legislative Council who served from 1861 to 1864 were appointed for life by the Governor on the advice of the Premier. The 1855 Constitution of New South Wales provided that the first council was appointed for a period of 5 years, but that subsequent members would be appointed for life. The previous council had ended in controversy with an attempt was made to swamp the chamber by appointing 21 new members in May 1861, because the council had rejected the Robertson land bills. When the council met and the new members were waiting to be sworn in, the President Sir William Burton stated that he felt he had been treated with discourtesy in the matter, resigned his office of president and his membership, and left the chamber. 19 other members also resigned in protest. In the absence of the President and Chairman of Committees, under the standing orders the council was adjourned. There were no further sitting days before the terms of the members of council had expired.

Of the 38 members prior to the attempted swamping, 12 were re-appointed, including just 4 of the 20 who had resigned in protest. (Note: The 4 members re-appointed were George Holden, Francis Merewether, James Mitchell and Edward Deas Thomson.) The Robertson Land Acts were passed by the Council on 17 October 1861.

This list includes members between the end of the initial terms on 13 May 1861 and the beginning of the 1864–65 colonial election on 22 November 1864. The President was William Wentworth until 10 October 1862 and then Terence Murray.

Name	Years in office	Office
George Allen (Note: 12 members who served in the first council were re-appointed on 24 June 1861.)	1856–1861, 1861–1877	Chairman of Committees
John Blaxland (Note: 3 members were appointed on 24 November 1863, and took their seats on 25 November 1863.)	1863–1884	
Edward Butler (Note: Edward Butler and Samuel Gordon were appointed on 2 September 1861, and took their seats on 3 September 1861.) (Note: Edward Butler resigned on 1 July 1863.)	1861–1863, 1877–1879	
William Byrnes	1858–1861, 1861–1891	
Alexander Campbell (Note: Francis Lord was appointed on 17 October 1864, and took his seat on 18 October 1864.)	1864–1890	
John Campbell (Note: 6 members were appointed on 24 June 1861, and took their seats on 3 September 1861.)	1856, 1861–1886	
George Cox (Note: 3 members were appointed on 17 June 1863, and took their seats on 23 June 1863.)	1863–1901	
Joseph Docker (Note: Joseph Docker was appointed on 1 December 1863, and took his seat on 26 December 1863.)	1856–1861, 1863–1884	
Robert Fitzgerald	1856–1861, 1861–1865	
Samuel Gordon	1861–1882	
John Hargrave	1859–1861, 1861–1865	Representative of the Government (9 March 1860 – 15 October 1863)
George Holden (Note: George Holden resigned on 14 October 1862.)	1856–1861, 1861–1863	
Thomas Icely (Note: Thomas Icely was appointed on 3 June 1864, and took his seat on 26 October 1864.)	1864–1874	
Robert Johnson	1856–1861, 1863–1866	
Charles Kemp (Note: Charles Kemp died on 1 April 1864.)	1861–1864	
Edward Lloyd (Note: Edward Lloyd was appointed on 17 June 1863, and took his seat on 1 July 1863.)	1863–1865	
Francis Lord	1856–1861, 1864–1893	
Sir William Macarthur	1864–1882	
John MacFarlane	1858–1861, 1861–1870	
Sir William Manning	1861–1876, 1888–1895	
Alexander McArthur	1861–1865	
Francis Merewether	1856–1861, 1861–1865	
James Mitchell	1856–1861, 1861–1869	
Sir Terence Murray (Note: Sir Terence Murray was appointed to the Council as President on 13 October 1862, and took his seat on 14 October 1862.)	1862–1873	President (14 October 1862 – 22 June 1873)
Edward Ogilvie	1863–1889	
John Plunkett (Note: John Plunkett was appointed on 24 June 1861, and took his seat on 1 October 1861.)	1857–1858, 1861–1869	Representative of the Government (16 October 1863 – 2 February 1865)
John Robertson (Note: John Robertson resigned on 30 December 1861 after the Robertson Land Acts were passed by the Council and was re-elected to the Legislative Assembly.)	1861, 1861, 1878–1881	Secretary for Lands (9 March 1860 – 15 October 1863)
Ralph Robey (Note: Ralph Robey and John Watt were appointed on 24 June 1861, and took their seats on 13 September 1861.) (Note: Ralph Robey died on 26 December 1863.)	1858–1861, 1861–1864	
Bourn Russell	1858–1861, 1861–1880	
William Russell	1861–1865	
Alexander Scott (Note: Alexander Scott was appointed on, and took his seat on 27 May 1862.)	1862–1866	
Edward Deas Thomson	1856–1861, 1861–1879	
Robert Towns	1856–1861, 1863–1873	
William Walker	1863–1867	
Edward Ward	1861–1865	
John Watt	1861–1866, 1874–1890	
William Wentworth (Note: William Wentworth resigned on 10 October 1862 to return to England.)	1861–1862	President (24 June 1861 – 10 October 1862)

== See also ==
- Third Cowper ministry (1861–1863)
- First Martin ministry (1863–1865)
