= Members of the New South Wales Legislative Council =

Following are lists of members of the New South Wales Legislative Council:

- Members of the New South Wales Legislative Council, 1823–1843
- Members of the New South Wales Legislative Council, 1843–1851
- Members of the New South Wales Legislative Council, 1851–1856
- Members of the New South Wales Legislative Council, 1856–1861
- Members of the New South Wales Legislative Council, 1861–1864
- Members of the New South Wales Legislative Council, 1864–1869
- Members of the New South Wales Legislative Council, 1869–1872
- Members of the New South Wales Legislative Council, 1872–1874
- Members of the New South Wales Legislative Council, 1874–1877
- Members of the New South Wales Legislative Council, 1877–1880
- Members of the New South Wales Legislative Council, 1880–1882
- Members of the New South Wales Legislative Council, 1882–1885
- Members of the New South Wales Legislative Council, 1885–1887
- Members of the New South Wales Legislative Council, 1887–1889
- Members of the New South Wales Legislative Council, 1889–1891
- Members of the New South Wales Legislative Council, 1891–1894
- Members of the New South Wales Legislative Council, 1894–1895
- Members of the New South Wales Legislative Council, 1895–1898
- Members of the New South Wales Legislative Council, 1898–1901
- Members of the New South Wales Legislative Council, 1901–1904
- Members of the New South Wales Legislative Council, 1904–1907
- Members of the New South Wales Legislative Council, 1907–1910
- Members of the New South Wales Legislative Council, 1910–1913
- Members of the New South Wales Legislative Council, 1913–1917
- Members of the New South Wales Legislative Council, 1917–1920
- Members of the New South Wales Legislative Council, 1920–1922
- Members of the New South Wales Legislative Council, 1922–1925
- Members of the New South Wales Legislative Council, 1925–1927
- Members of the New South Wales Legislative Council, 1927–1930
- Members of the New South Wales Legislative Council, 1930–1932
- Members of the New South Wales Legislative Council, 1932–1934
- Members of the New South Wales Legislative Council, 1934–1937
- Members of the New South Wales Legislative Council, 1937–1940
- Members of the New South Wales Legislative Council, 1940–1943
- Members of the New South Wales Legislative Council, 1943–1946
- Members of the New South Wales Legislative Council, 1946–1949
- Members of the New South Wales Legislative Council, 1949–1952
- Members of the New South Wales Legislative Council, 1952–1955
- Members of the New South Wales Legislative Council, 1955–1958
- Members of the New South Wales Legislative Council, 1958–1961
- Members of the New South Wales Legislative Council, 1961–1964
- Members of the New South Wales Legislative Council, 1964–1967
- Members of the New South Wales Legislative Council, 1967–1970
- Members of the New South Wales Legislative Council, 1970–1973
- Members of the New South Wales Legislative Council, 1973–1976
- Members of the New South Wales Legislative Council, 1976–1978
- Members of the New South Wales Legislative Council, 1978–1981
- Members of the New South Wales Legislative Council, 1981–1984
- Members of the New South Wales Legislative Council, 1984–1988
- Members of the New South Wales Legislative Council, 1988–1991
- Members of the New South Wales Legislative Council, 1991–1995
- Members of the New South Wales Legislative Council, 1995–1999
- Members of the New South Wales Legislative Council, 1999–2003
- Members of the New South Wales Legislative Council, 2003–2007
- Members of the New South Wales Legislative Council, 2007–2011
- Members of the New South Wales Legislative Council, 2011–2015
- Members of the New South Wales Legislative Council, 2015–2019
- Members of the New South Wales Legislative Council, 2019–2023
