= James Chisholm =

James Chisholm may refer to:

- James Chisholm (bishop) (died c. 1545), Scottish Catholic Bishop of Dunblane 1487–1526
- James Chisholm (merchant) (1772–1837), colonial Australia
  - James Chisholm (politician) (1806–1888), son of the merchant, and legislator
- James Chisholm (priest) (1815–1855), Episcopal, Portsmouth, Virginia, US
- James Chisholm of The Troth heathen organization
- James Chisholm (rugby union) (born 1995), English

== See also ==
- Jimmy Chisholm (born 1956), Scottish actor in Take the High Road
- James Chisholm King (1886–1970), Canadian dentist and politician
- James Chisholm Dillon (1880–1949), Australian politician
