= Members of the New South Wales Legislative Council, 1869–1872 =

Members of the New South Wales Legislative Council who served from 1869 to 1872 were appointed for life by the Governor on the advice of the Premier. This list includes members between the beginning of the 1869–70 colonial election on 3 December 1869 and the beginning of the 1872 colonial election on 13 February 1872. The President was Sir Terence Murray.

Name	Years in office	Office
George Allen	1856–1861, 1861–1877	Chairman of Committees
John Blaxland	1863–1884	
William Busby	1867–1887	
William Byrnes	1858–1861, 1861–1891	
Alexander Campbell	1864–1890	
Charles Campbell (Note: Charles Campbell was appointed on 25 January 1870, and took his seat on 1 February 1870.)	1870–1888	
John Campbell	1856, 1861–1886	
James Chisholm	1865–1888	
George Cox	1863–1901	
William Dalley (Note: William Dalley was appointed on 28 May 1870, and took his seat on 11 August 1870.)	1870–1873, 1875–1880, 1883–1888	
Frederick Darley	1868–1886	
Joseph Docker	1856–1861, 1863–1884	Representative of the Government (16 December 1870 – 13 May 1872)
Samuel Gordon	1861–1882	
John Hay	1867–1892	
Thomas Holt	1868–1883	
Thomas Icely	1843–1853; 1855–1856; 1864–1874	
Patrick Jennings (Note: Patrick Jennings resigned on 17 December 1869 to return to the Legislative Assembly at the election for The Murray.)	1867–1869, 1890–1897	
Francis Lord	1856–1861, 1864–1893	
Sir William Macarthur	1864–1882	
John MacFarlane (Note: John MacFarlane resigned on 26 May 1870.)	1858–1861, 1861–1870	
Sir William Manning (Note: While Sir William Manning was Attorney General he refused to sit in the cabinet or represent the government in the Council.)	1861–1876, 1888–1895	Attorney General (21 October 1868 - 15 December 1870)
Henry Moore	1868–1888	
Sir Terence Murray	1862–1873	President
Edward Ogilvie	1863–1889	
Robert Owen	1868–1878	Representative of the Government (27 October 1868 – 1 August 1870)
Alexander Park	1858–1861, 1868–1873	
John Richardson	1868–1887	
Bourn Russell	1858–1861, 1861–1880	
Julian Salomons (Note: Julian Salomons was not a member of parliament when he was appointed Solicitor General in December 1869. He was appointed to the Legislative Council on 4 August 1870, took his seat on 11 August 1870 and resigned on 14 February 1871.)	1870–1871, 1887–1899	Solicitor General (18 December 1869 – 15 December 1870); Representative of the Government (11 August 1870 – 15 December 1870)
Thomas Smart (Note: Thomas Smart was appointed on 25 January 1870, and took his seat on 27 January 1870.)	1870–1881	
Sir Edward Deas Thomson	1856–1861, 1861–1879	
Robert Towns	1856–1861, 1863–1873	
Elias Weekes	1865–1880	

== See also ==
- Second Robertson ministry (1868–1870)
- Fifth Cowper ministry (1870)
- Third Martin ministry (1870–1872)
