= Members of the New South Wales Legislative Council, 1872–1874 =

Members of the New South Wales Legislative Council who served from 1872 to 1874 were appointed for life by the Governor on the advice of the Premier. This list includes members between the beginning of the 1872 colonial election on 13 February 1872 and the beginning of the 1874–75 colonial election on 8 December 1874. The President was Sir Terence Murray until his death on 22 June 1873 and then John Hay.

Name	Years in office	Office
George Allen	1856–1861, 1861–1877	Chairman of Committees (4 June 1856 – 15 January 1873)
John Blaxland	1863–1884	
William Busby	1867–1887	
William Byrnes	1858–1861, 1861–1891	
Alexander Campbell	1864–1890	
Charles Campbell	1870–1888	
John Campbell	1856, 1861–1886	
James Chisholm	1865–1888	
Edward Cox (Note: Edward Cox was appointed on 14 July 1874, and took his seat on 11 November 1874.)	1874–1883	
George Cox	1863–1901	
William Dalley (Note: William Dalley resigned on 19 September 1873.)	1870–1873, 1875–1880, 1883–1888	
Frederick Darley	1868–1886	
Leopold De Salis (Note: 5 members were appointed on 14 July 1874, and took their seats on 3 November 1874.)	1874–1898	
Joseph Docker	1856–1861, 1863–1884	Representative of the Government and Postmaster-General (16 December 1870 – 13 May 1872); Chairman of Committees (15 January 1873 – 9 February 1875)
John Fairfax (Note: John Fairfax and John Watt were appointed on 29 October 1874, and took their seats on 3 November 1874.)	1874–1877	
John Frazer	1874–1884	
Samuel Gordon	1861–1882	
John Hay	1867–1892	President (8 July 1872 - 10 January 1892)
Thomas Holt	1868–1883	
Thomas Icely (Note: Thomas Icely died on 13 February 1874.)	1843–1853; 1855–1856; 1864–1874	
Joseph Innes (Note: Joseph Innes was appointed on 1 September 1873, and took his seat on 9 September 1873.)	1873–1881	Representative of the Government (13 September 1873 – 8 February 1875); Attorney General (20 November 1873 – 8 February 1875)
Francis Lord	1856–1861, 1864–1893	
Sir William Macarthur	1864–1882	
Sir William Manning	1861–1876, 1888–1895	
Jacob Montefiore	1856–1860, 1874–1877	
Henry Moore	1868–1888	
Sir Terence Murray (Note: Sir Terence Murray died on 22 June 1873.)	1862–1873	President (14 October 1862 - 22 June 1873)
Edward Ogilvie	1863–1889	
Robert Owen	1868–1878	
Alexander Park (Note: Alexander Park died on 21 July 1873.)	1858–1861, 1868–1873	
John Richardson	1868–1887	
Bourn Russell	1858–1861, 1861–1880	
Saul Samuel (Note: Saul Samuel was appointed on 5 June 1872, and took his seat on 12 June 1872.)	1872–1880	Postmaster-General and Vice-President of the Executive Council (3 December 1872 – 8 February 1875)
Thomas Smart	1870–1881	
John Smith	1874–1885	
Sir Edward Deas Thomson	1856–1861, 1861–1879	
Robert Towns (Note: Robert Towns died on 11 April 1873.)	1856–1861, 1863–1873	
John Watt	1861–1866, 1874–1890	
Elias Weekes	1865–1880	
James White	1874–1890	

== See also ==
- Third Martin ministry (1870–1872)
- First Parkes ministry (1872–1875)
