= Cumberland Place and Steps =

Heritage-listed street in Sydney, Australia

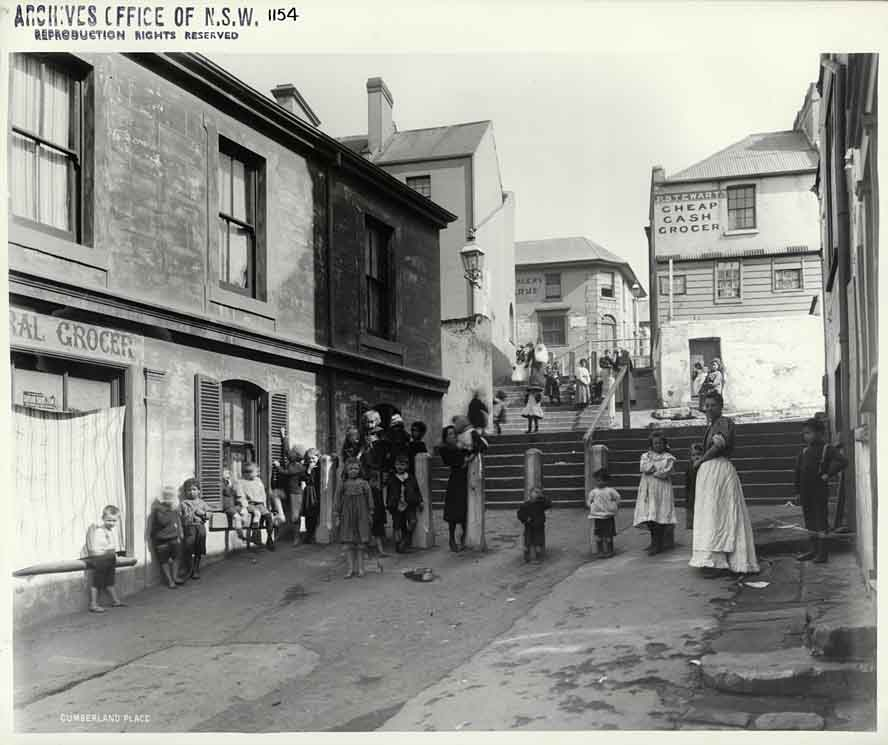
- Cumberland Place and Steps, 1901

- Location within Sydney Location within Australia
- 33.8602°S 151.2075°E
- Location: Cumberland Place, The Rocks, City of Sydney, New South Wales, Australia

History
- Built: 1807

Site notes
- Owner: Property NSW

New South Wales Heritage Register
- Official name: Cumberland Place and Steps; Suffolk Lane; Stubbs Lane; Gloucester Lane; Cribb's Lane
- Type: State heritage (built)
- Designated: 10 May 2002
- Reference no.: 1542
- Type: Townscape
- Category: Urban Area

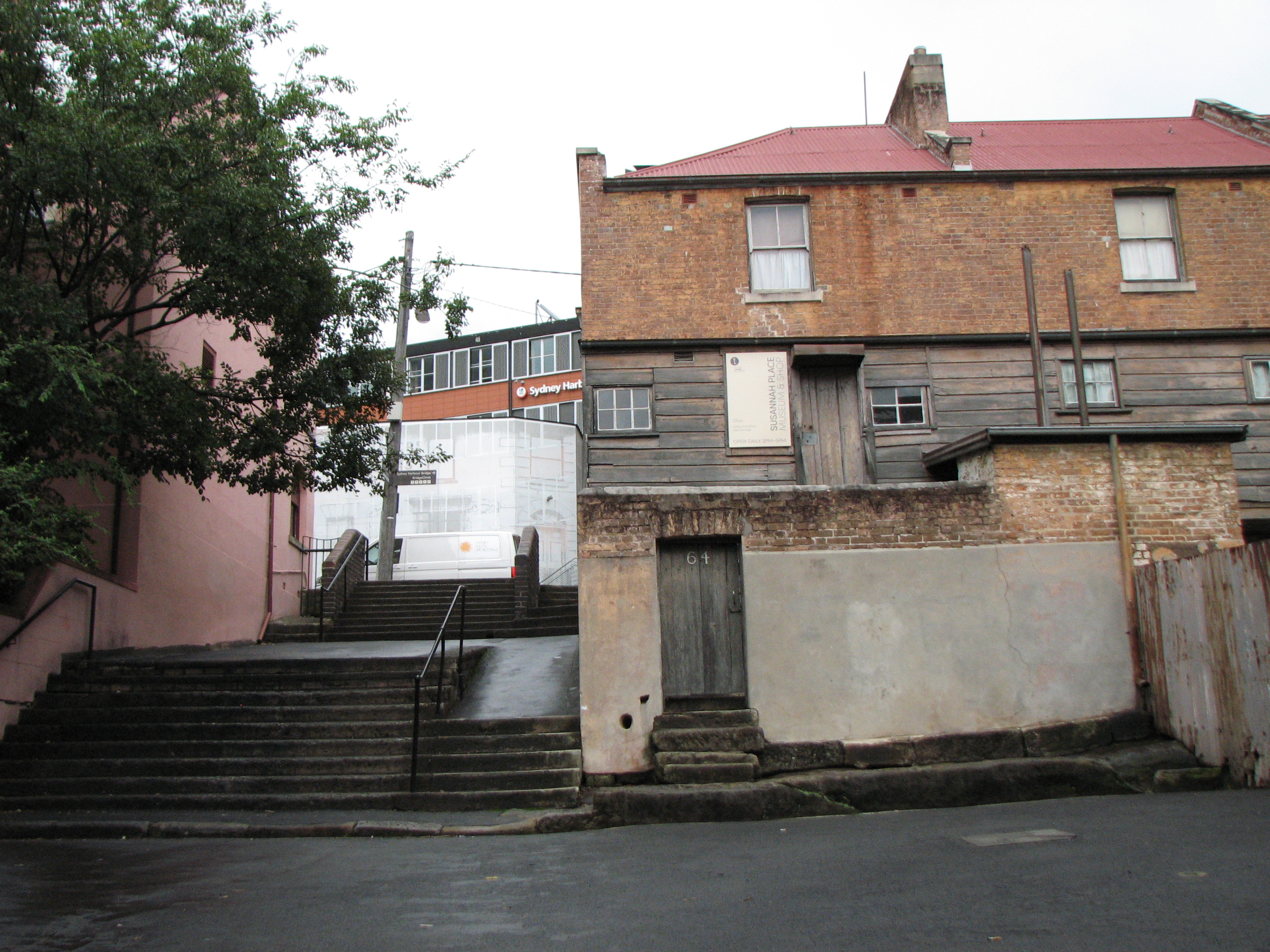
Cumberland Place and Steps from the steps leading to Harrington Street, The Rocks, NSW, 2019

The Cumberland Place and Steps are heritage-listed steps and a laneway located at Cumberland Place, in the inner city Sydney suburb of The Rocks, New South Wales in Australia. It was built from 1807. It is also known as Suffolk Lane; Stubbs Lane; Gloucester Lane; and Cribb's Lane. The property is owned by Property NSW, an agency of the Government of New South Wales. It was added to the New South Wales State Heritage Register on 10 May 2002.

The top steps lead to Cumberland Street. A set of steps at the lower end of the place leads to Harrington Street. Cumberland Place gives access to the rear of Susannah Place, a heritage-listed building, formerly cottages and a store and now a museum.

== History ==
The 1994 archaeological investigation on the Cumberland and Gloucester Streets site confirmed that Cribbs Lane was in existence, between Cumberland and Gloucester Streets, by at least 1811. However the laneway may have existed earlier as early maps and plans show a footpath or track between Cambridge and Cumberland Streets on the alignment of Cumberland Place by 1807, and the convict butcher, George Cribb, purchased a house in 1809 that lay along the alignment of the laneway. Cribb set about purchasing properties around this house, and all this land was on the southern side of the laneway alignment. By 1811 he owned almost half of the land on the area today included in the Cumberland and Gloucester Streets archaeological site, including along Gloucester Street.

Cumberland Place between Cambridge and Gloucester Street is on the same alignment as Cribbs Lane between Gloucester and Cumberland Streets, so this could indicate that Cribbs lane extended from Cumberland Street to Harrington Street. The section between Cambridge Street and Cumberland Street was called Cribb's Lane by 1823.

Harper's Plan of Sydney 1823 shows Cribbs Lane labelled as 'Stubb's Lane', with name crossed out. Between Harrington Street and Cambridge Street the thoroughfare is not shown but there is a clear area in the exact location of the lane, between building lines. Inspection of a copy of the original shows that a laneway may have been drawn in this location, but it wasn't labelled and is very faint. It appears that in 1973 the overlay map made use of knowledge of the area and filled in the blanks. By 1825, similar through lanes (e.g. Longs Lane), were well established, and their names recorded on contemporary maps. Gloucester Street itself did not have a regular alignment.

One of the boundaries to Cumberland Place at the eastern side of Gloucester Street is Susannah Place, a row of four terrace houses (one serving as shop), constructed in 1844. Harpers map of 1823 indicates structures here by that date facing Cambridge Street and this could be interpreted to mean that the boundary of Cumberland Place was already set by the time Harper's map was surveyed in the early 1820s. A public house was in operation on this site from c.1824. A building application dated 20 October 1830 for a two-storey stone building included a provision for Cribbs Lane to remain.

The first original depiction of a thoroughfare between Harrington and Gloucester Streets in the location of Cumberland Place appears in the 1832 NSW General Post Office (GPO) Directory. An 1838 plan of Sydney is the earliest known official plan that shows the name of the "Cribbs Lane" between Cumberland and Gloucester Streets.

In the 1840s, the jail moved from its site on George Street to Darlinghurst, and the original jail building was demolished. A plan was drawn up to show the land of the jail and the "Proposed Realignment of Harrington Street". The plan shows a "Proposed Lane" where Cumberland Place is now. This laneway was already in existence by that date, so this plan could be the instrument used to formalise the thoroughfare. Similarly, Globe Street, which was also depicted in some earlier maps and plans, is here marked as a "Proposed Street", indicating that in 1848 it had not been officially recognised.

The expansion of Sydney suburbs to the east, south and west made the city too large to be depicted with much detail on most maps produced after the 1840s. Small laneways and alleys were seldom shown as the scale of maps increased. One of the maps that shows The Rocks at a good level of detail is the 1865 Trigonometrical Survey of Sydney. This map shows and labels Cribbs Lane running from Harrington Street to Cumberland Street. Interestingly, there are no stairs marked on the alignment of the laneway, but the stairs at the retaining wall in the centre of Harrington Street are shown. This may indicate that the stairs that are today an important feature of Cumberland Place had not been built before 1865.

The name of the thoroughfare was changed between 1890 and 1900. Since the early 1800s the entire laneway from Harrington to Cumberland Street was known as Cribbs Lane. In 1896 the Sydney City Council received petitions to change that name to Cumberland Place. Since all plans and historic images from that date refer to the lane as Cumberland Place, it is assumed that the suggestion was acted upon. The name Cumberland Place held much more prestige than Cribbs Lane. The Council at the time was changing names around the city primarily to try to cut down on duplication of names, but anyone could request a name change for any reason, and all the council had to do was to gazette it.

The date of creation of the earliest steps in Cumberland Place cannot be confirmed. They were apparently built some time before 1887, as the earliest documents to show the steps on Cumberland Place are the City of Sydney Sections, drawn in that year. The road levels in Harrington Street were changed in 1907 to their current level. Previously, they were on two levels. This may have affected the steps into the laneway from Harrington Street. An etching by Lionel Lindsay, dated c. 1911, shows a narrower flight of steps from Harrington Street than exists today. The etching provides evidence from the stone retaining walls on Harrington Street that the steps were widened to the north. They were widened to twice their original width during the 1970s. Due to wear, the older side of the Harrington Street Steps were fenced off and the other side capped with concrete in the 1990s.

When Cumberland Street was realigned and widened in 1911, the streetscape of Gloucester Street changed significantly, as a number of buildings were demolished including the notable Gloucester Street Bridge. As two sections of Gloucester Street were divided, and its level in the vicinity of the subject site was raised, a retaining wall was constructed in front of the Gloucester Street terraces (including Susannah Place) to support the newly elevated grounds of the street. About that time, the fourth set of stairs was added to Cumberland Place.

== Description ==
Cumberland Place and Steps is a public thoroughfare from Harrington to Cumberland Street, comprising a laneway with a series of flights of steps and landings.

Half of the first flight of steps from Harrington Street between Nos. 55 and 57 has been fenced off from public use by an iron railing for safety reasons as the stone is very worn and uneven. These are the steps depicted in an etching by Lionel Lindsay c. 1911, which are narrower than the steps as they are today. The steps have been widened to the north and are continuous with the stone steps but have been given a concrete surface over stone. There is a landing which opens up to an area shaded a tree then concrete aggregate steps continue up to the Cambridge Street level, where there is an early lamp post (c. 1840s).

The pedestrian way continues up to Cumberland Street via two further flights of stairs with a landing leading to Cumberland Street, between No. 64 (Susannah Place) and Baker's Terrace, Nos. 66-72 Cumberland Street. There is a bitumen block edging to the ramp on the northern side of the first flight of steps from Cambridge Street, which dated from c. 1900. There are other such blocks found only at the Victoria Barracks, the East Sydney Technical College, the Lands Department central courtyard and at Garryowen, Rozelle Hospital.

Across the road, Cribbs Lane, which is on the same alignment was uncovered during the 1994 excavation of the Cumberland/Gloucester Street dig site, it is assumed from the evidence that this laneway is associated with Cumberland Place and once extended from Cumberland Street through to Harrington Street. The Cribbs Lane section was planned to reopen to the public near the end of 2009.

=== Condition ===
As at 13 May 2004, the condition of the site is fair. The worn steps have been fenced off to prevent the public using them for safety reasons. A concrete layer has been installed over the original stone for safety and conservation reasons. The Cribbs Lane section, between Gloucester and Cumberland Street is flagged with sandstone and was covered by bitumen. This section is an archaeological item. The Cumberland Place section between Gloucester and Harrington Street is likely to contain an important archaeological resource.

Archaeology undisturbed

== Heritage listing ==
As at 27 January 2009, Cumberland Place is of heritage significance for the State of NSW for historical and scientific reasons. It is of significance for The Rocks and Sydney areas and for the Foreshore Authority for its elements that are rare or representative on the local level. Cumberland Place is a related place to a number of State heritage items located in the adjacent Harrington, Cambridge, Cumberland and Gloucester Streets. Cumberland Place is of historical significance as one of the oldest known pedestrian streets in The Rocks, and probably Australia, being continuously in use since at least 1808. It is significant for the local area and Sydney in demonstrating the early urban character and scale of development that characterised The Rocks throughout the 19th Century, particularly as part of the Cribbs Lane. Its physical form demonstrates the urban planning response of the early days of the European settlement to the local rocky topography. There is a high likelihood of encountering archaeological relics on the site, and these relics may be of State level of significance. Cumberland Place includes elements of planned urban facilities, including stars, stair risers and retaining walls as elements that are rare or representative in the local context. This includes historical stone risers, worn of long use, which are elements of archaeological interest.

Cumberland Place and Steps was listed on the New South Wales State Heritage Register on 10 May 2002 having satisfied the following criteria.

The place is important in demonstrating the course, or pattern, of cultural or natural history in New South Wales.

Cumberland Place is historically significant as a pedestrian path that continuously connects the higher areas of The Rocks to the Sydney Cove since at least 1808. The current configuration is historically significant in demonstrating that path, and as the southern part of Cribbs Lane that was defined in The Rocks from the 1840s. The present configuration (and some elements of fabric) relate to that early configuration, with several buildings that defined Cumberland Place surviving, including Susannah Place (c. 1849) and Baker's Terrace (parts from the 1860s) on Gloucester Street. The surviving Cumberland Place fabric is important in demonstrating the pedestrian character and modest scale of the narrow lanes that characterised The Rocks in the 19th Century. The creation of Cumberland Place as a series of ramps, stairs and concourses demonstrates the urban planning response of the early days colony to the rocky topography. Cumberland Place meets this criterion on State level.

The place has a strong or special association with a person, or group of persons, of importance of cultural or natural history of New South Wales's history.

Cumberland Place has evolved over a considerable period of time through subsequent improvements of the pathway that would originally have been selected by pedestrians due to its favourable natural terrain configuration. However, there is no strong or special association with any particular person of importance in the course of history. Cumberland Place does not meet this criterion.

The place is important in demonstrating aesthetic characteristics and/or a high degree of creative or technical achievement in New South Wales.

The extant fabric of Cumberland Place is an example of public stairs and passageways of the 19th and 20th Centuries in Sydney, however, it does not appear to possess any rare or unusual features that could be described as important in terms of aesthetics, or of creative or technical achievement. Cumberland Place does not meet this criterion.

The place has a strong or special association with a particular community or cultural group in New South Wales for social, cultural or spiritual reasons.

Cumberland Place is of interest for heritage professionals and general public for its important part in the history of The Rocks.

The place has potential to yield information that will contribute to an understanding of the cultural or natural history of New South Wales.

It is estimated that archaeological relics of State significance may survive under the protective layers of concrete and asphalt, including below Stairs B, C and D and the associated concourses. Important elements of early fabric are also likely to survive within the three of the four stairs, and the significance of these elements is likely to be of local level. Cumberland Place meets this criterion on State level.

The place possesses uncommon, rare or endangered aspects of the cultural or natural history of New South Wales.

Cumberland Place is rare in The Rocks and Sydney context as a remnant of a pedestrian urban communication path, indicative of the scale and character of early Sydney. The surviving fabric includes original and early stone risers, bricks, and retaining walls as elements that are rare in The Rocks and Sydney terms.

The place is important in demonstrating the principal characteristics of a class of cultural or natural places/environments in New South Wales.

Cumberland Place is important in demonstrating the character of an early urban environment of Sydney. In its current form, its elements are identifiable as examples of Sydney's urban facilities of the 19th and 20th century and are representative of government's approach to the urban design and planning in the various periods.

== See also ==
- List of streets in Sydney
