= Lancelot Ward =

English cricketer and educator

Personal information
- Full name: Lancelot Bangor Ward
- Born: 14 September 1883; Shillong, Assam, British India
- Died: 12 July 1959 (aged 75); Cardigan, Cardiganshire, Wales
- Batting: Unknown
- Bowling: Unknown
- Relatives: William Ward (father); Edward Ward (uncle)

Domestic team information
- Years: Team
- 1910/11: Europeans

Career statistics
Competition	First-class
Matches	2
Runs scored	8
Batting average	25.33
100s/50s	–/–
Top score	7
Balls bowled	246
Wickets	2
Bowling average	60.00
5 wickets in innings	–
10 wickets in match	–
Best bowling	2/28
Catches/stumpings	3/–
- Source: ESPNcricinfo, 2 December 2022

Lancelot Bangor Ward (14 September 1883 — 12 July 1959) was an English first-class cricketer and an officer in the Indian Civil Service.

The son of William Erskine Ward, he was born in British India at Shillong in September 1883. He was educated in England at Marlborough College, before matriculating to Trinity College, Cambridge. After graduating from Cambridge, he joined the Indian Civil Service in June 1905. Ward held a number of positions within the civil service with the Indian Finance Department, holding the position of accountant-general for the Central Provinces and Berar by April 1926. While in India, he made two appearances in first-class cricket for the Europeans cricket team in September 1910, against the Parsees and the Hindus. He scored 7 runs in his two matches, in addition to taking 2 wickets. Ward later returned to the United Kingdom, where he died in Wales at Cardigan in July 1959. His uncle, Edward Wolstenholme Ward, was also a first-class cricketer.
