= Anna Maria Bunn =

Australian writer

Anna Maria Bunn (1808–1889) was the anonymous author of The Guardian: a Tale (by an Australian) (1838), the first novel published on mainland Australia and the first in the continent by a woman. Bunn's authorship was only established after a historian found a copy of the book in which her son had noted his mother's authorship.

== Life ==
Anna Maria Murray was born in Ireland in 1808 and in 1827 came to Australia with her father, who, as a retired army officer, was entitled to a free land grant in New South Wales. Her brother Terence Aubrey Murray also came out, while her brother James remained behind until he had finished training as a surgeon. A year later she married Captain George Bunn, a mariner and merchant, a brother of the English theatrical manager Alfred Bunn. They settled in Pyrmont in Sydney. Captain Bunn died suddenly on 9 January 1834, aged 43, leaving Anna Maria aged 25 years, with two small sons and in financial difficulties. It was in the five years after her husband's death that she wrote the novel. In this time she alternated between living with her brother James, who owned Woden homestead and her brother Terence, who owned Yarralumla homestead, both in the area of present-day Canberra. She had planned to return to Ireland, but this became impractical. In 1852 she moved to live at St Omer in the Braidwood district a property of which had been owned by Captain Bunn but which the couple had never occupied. In 1860 her youngest son died from a fall from a horse, and five years later his wife and son died of typhoid fever, leaving a daughter Georgiana who was raised by Anna Maria. Bunn apparently wrote nothing else apart from her novel, but she did produce paintings of insects and flowers which are in the collection of the National Library of Australia. She died at St Omer on 19 September 1889. Her grave is in the Braidwood General Cemetery.

== Novel ==
The novel mixes the apparently incongruous modes of the Gothic novel and the comedy of manners. The setting is England and Ireland, with New South Wales only referred to at times in the text, mostly in amusingly disparaging terms. It is written partly in the form of letters between two former school friends and partly in third person narrative. Themes include the search for security, the issue of whether to marry for love (the author appears to be against it) and the ups and downs of marriage. These are expressed in a melodramatic gothic plot culminating in infanticide and suicide. The author does not seem particularly comfortable with the Gothic sensibility. Dale Spender points out that although the plot includes the eventual discovery of an incestuous secret (husband and wife discover that they are also brother and sister), the author seems blasé about this turn of affairs and regards such a situation as unfortunate rather than a sin that will be punished.
