= Electoral district of Counties of Murray, King and Georgiana =

Former legislative council electoral district of New South Wales, Australia

Counties of Murray, King and Georgiana New South Wales—Legislative Council
- State: New South Wales
- Created: 1843
- Abolished: 1851
- Namesake: Murray County, King County, Georgiana County
- Coordinates: 34°50′30″S 148°54′39″E

The Electoral district of Counties of Murray, King and Georgiana and from 1851, Counties of King and Georgiana was an electorate of the partially elected New South Wales Legislative Council, created for the first elections for the Council in 1843. The electoral district included the south western counties of Murray, King and Georgiana. Polling took place at Queanbeyan, Yass and Wheeo, which were within the counties and the nearby towns of Braidwood, Goulburn and Bathurst. The towns of Queanbeyan and Yass were removed from the district with the expansion of the Council in 1851 and combined with Braidwood and Goulburn to form the Southern Boroughs. The rural area of the County of Murray became part of the Counties of Murray and St Vincent and leaving the district to cover the remaining rural areas of the Counties of King and Gergiana.

At all three elections, there was only one candidate who was therefore elected unopposed. In 1856 the unicameral Legislative Council was abolished and replaced with an elected Legislative Assembly and an appointed Legislative Council. The district was represented by the Legislative Assembly electorate of King and Georgiana.

== Members ==
District name	Member	Term
Murray, King and Georgiana	Terence Murray	Jun 1843 – Jun 1851
King and Georgiana	James Chisholm	Sep 1851 – Feb 1856

Terence Murray went on to represent the Southern Boroughs from September 1851.

== Election results ==
=== 1843 ===
1843 New South Wales colonial election, 22 June: Counties of Murray, King and Georgiana
Candidate	Votes	%
Terence Murray	unopposed	

=== 1848 ===
1848 New South Wales colonial election, 31 July: Counties of Murray, King and Georgiana
Candidate	Votes	%
Terence Murray (elected)	unopposed	

=== 1851 ===
1851 New South Wales colonial election, 20 September: Counties of King and Georgiana
Candidate	Votes	%
James Chisholm	unopposed	

== See also ==
- Members of the New South Wales Legislative Council, 1843–1851
