= Electoral district of Southern Boroughs (NSW Legislative Council) =

Former legislative council electoral district of New South Wales, Australia

Southern Boroughs New South Wales—Legislative Council
- State: New South Wales
- Created: 1851
- Abolished: 1856
- Coordinates: 34°45′S 149°43′E

The Electoral district of Southern Boroughs was an electorate of the New South Wales Legislative Council at a time when some of its members were elected and the balance were appointed by the Governor. It was a new electorate created in 1851 by the expansion of the Legislative Council to 54, 18 to be appointed and 36 elected. The district consisted of the towns of Goulburn, Braidwood, Yass and Queanbeyan, while the surrounding rural area were in the districts of Argyle, Counties of Murray and St Vincent and Counties of King and Georgiana.

In 1856 the unicameral Legislative Council was abolished and replaced with an elected Legislative Assembly and an appointed Legislative Council. The district was represented by the Legislative Assembly electorate of Southern Boroughs.

== Members ==
Member	Term
Terence Murray	Sep 1851 – Feb 1856

Terence Murray went on to represent Southern Boroughs in the Legislative Assembly from 1856.

== Election results ==
=== 1851 ===
1851 New South Wales colonial election, 22 September: Southern Boroughs
Candidate	Votes	%
Terence Murray	unopposed	
