= William Erskine Ward =

British Indian Civil Service officer

Sir William Erskine Ward KCSI (4 February 1838 – 24 December 1916) was a British Indian Civil Service officer.

Ward was the son of Hon. John Petty Ward and Eleanor Erskine, and the great-grandson of Bernard Ward, 1st Viscount Bangor. He was educated at Trinity College, Cambridge.

He served as Chief Commissioner of Assam between 1885 and 1887, and was made Companion of the Order of the Star of India in 1888. He served as Chief Commissioner of Assam for a second period between 1891 and 1896. In 1896 he was knighted as Knight Commander of the Order of the Star of India. His son, Lancelot, was also an officer in the Indian Civil Service and a first-class cricketer.

Government offices
Preceded by Sir Charles Alfred Elliott	Chief Commissioner of Assam; 1885-1887 (First time)	Succeeded by Sir Dennis Fitzpatrick
Preceded by James Wallace Quinton	Chief Commissioner of Assam; 1891-1896 (Second time)	Succeeded by Sir Henry Cotton
