= Terence Aubrey Murray =

Australian politician (1810–1873)

Sir Terence Aubrey Murray
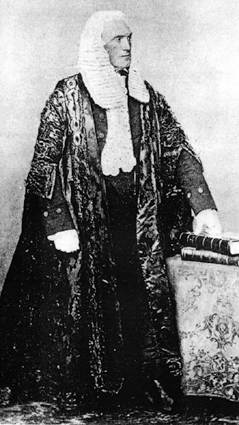

Member of Parliament for electoral district of Argyle
- In office 1859–1862

2nd Speaker of the New South Wales Legislative Assembly
- In office 31 January 1860 – 13 October 1862
- Preceded by: Sir Daniel Cooper
- Succeeded by: John Hay

5th President of the New South Wales Legislative Council
- In office 14 October 1862 – 22 June 1873
- Preceded by: William Wentworth
- Succeeded by: Sir John Hay
- Born: 10 May 1810; Limerick, Ireland
- Died: 22 June 1873 (aged 63); Darlinghurst, New South Wales
- Spouse(s): Mary 'Minnie' Gibbes (m. 1843; died 1858) Agnes Edwardes (m. 1860)
- Relatives: Hubert Murray (son); Gilbert Murray (son)

Sir Terence Aubrey Murray (10 May 1810 – 22 June 1873) was an Irish-Australian pastoralist, parliamentarian and knight of the realm. He had the double distinction of being, at separate times, both the Speaker of the New South Wales Legislative Assembly and the President of the New South Wales Legislative Council. From 1837 to 1859 he owned the Yarralumla estate, which now serves as the official Canberra residence of the Governor-General of Australia.

== Early years and background ==
Murray was born in Limerick, Ireland, into a patriotic and politically aware Roman Catholic family. His mother, Ellen Murray (née Fitzgerald), died at Saint-Omer in France in 1812, when Terence was still a child. His father, also named Terence, served as a paymaster in the British Army, enjoying the commissioned rank of captain. Young Terence had two older siblings, Dr James Fitzgerald Murray (who trained as a surgeon), and poet, Anna Maria Murray (who married farmer and grazier George Bunn, of Braidwood, New South Wales).

Paymaster Captain Terence Murray (1781–1835) had travelled with his regiment on a posting to the Australian colony of New South Wales in 1817 and later, in 1825, to India. In 1827, Captain Murray, then a single father, decided to move permanently to New South Wales with Anna-Maria and Terence Aubrey, to take advantage of the free land grants being made to military officers by the colonial government. They arrived in Sydney in April 1827 on the Elizabeth and leased a house at Erskine Park as a temporary measure. Capt. Murray's eldest son, James Fitzgerald, joined them after he finished medical school.

Around 1829, Murray acquired his first farming and grazing land near the village of Collector, south-west of Sydney. His main property was situated alongside Lake George. He called it Winderradeen. Murray added to his country estates in 1837 when he purchased another large sheep-grazing property, Yarralumla, on the Limestone Plains (in what is now the Australian Capital Territory). Today, Yarralumla is the site of the official residence of the Governor-General of Australia. Murray also acquired the Coolamine outstation, where he could graze his sheep in cooler conditions during the hot summer months.

== Political career ==
With the establishment of a partially representative parliament in the colony in 1843, Murray resolved to pursue a political career. He was elected unopposed to the New South Wales Legislative Council, representing the Counties of Murray, King and Georgiana. During the ensuing years, he played a prominent role in parliamentary debates and proceedings. In 1856, a fully representative Legislative Assembly was established with the introduction of responsible government. Murray was duly elected to it, representing the electoral district of Southern Boroughs, and from 1859 Argyle. In 1856–1858, he sat in the New South Wales cabinet as the Secretary for Lands and Works. At one point, Murray had the opportunity to form a ministry with himself heading up the government as premier. But the move failed when Murray was unable to enlist the support of sufficient Members of Parliament, a number of whom disliked him, finding him intellectually arrogant. Substantial discrimination against Irish Catholics existed in the colony at that time, and robust Parliamentary debate involving aspersions cast against Murray's religion, can be found on the Hansard. Murray is attributed by biographer, Gwendoline Wilson, as the first colonial politician to campaign against 'transportation' and the death penalty. Murray is noted by biographer, Wilson, to have commissioned Stewart Mowle to preserve the local Aboriginal nations' languages. Wilson, a descendant of Mowle, noted he then catalogued 12. Murray also named his property Winderradeen after the notable Wiradjuri warrior and resistance leader Windradyne, who had been active in the Lake George area.

From 1860 to 1862, Murray served as an extremely effective and genuinely impartial speaker of the legislative assembly. Towards the end of 1862, he was appointed for life to the legislative council, which was the upper house of the New South Wales Parliament. He would serve as a "distinguished" president of the council until his death in 1873.

Murray was a highly intelligent, extremely well-read country "squire". He owned an extensive library of books, a fine collection of furniture and other household possessions, and a comparatively liberal (if sometimes outspokenly opinionated) view of society and its institutions. His library included buddhist and other religious texts, philosophy, political science and sociology texts, and, a Quran. He was tall in stature (over 190 cm) with red hair, a swaggering walk and an imposing physical presence. Murray was also an outstanding horseman and bushman who, at the same time, liked to pursue the comfortable lifestyle of a prosperous "landed gentleman", drawing rents from the tenant farmers who occupied a large portion of Yarralumla after the abolition of assigned convict labour in the early 1840s.

== Marriage to Minnie Gibbes ==
On 27 May 1843, Murray married into the Anglo-colonial establishment when he wed Mary "Minnie" Gibbes (1817–1858) at St James' Anglican Church, Sydney. English-born Mary went to live with her new husband (whom she called "Aubrey") at Yarralumla homestead; but being a cultivated and gregarious young lady, she found it extremely hard to adjust to rural life in the lonely and uncouth Australian countryside. She was also physically frail, and the six pregnancies that she experienced during the time of her marriage to Murray badly weakened her constitution, leaving her vulnerable to infection. At the time of Mary's wedding, Murray had settled a moiety of his landed property on her in case he should ever become bankrupt as a result of drought or economic depression. When 40-year-old Mary died suddenly at Winderradeen homestead on 2 January 1858, this arrangement put Murray in a difficult situation because control of Yarralumla and a key part of Winderradeen now passed to the trustees of Mary's estate. Murray wanted to sell some of the land but he could not do so without the trustees' permission. The trustees included Murray's father-in-law, Colonel John George Nathaniel Gibbes (1787-1873), who was a member of the colonial legislature and the Collector of Customs for NSW, and Murray's brother-in-law, Augustus Onslow Manby Gibbes (1828–1897), who was the manager of Yarralumla. (A third trustee, the politician, landowner and founder of the University of Sydney Sir Charles Nicholson, would return to England to live in 1862 and cease to be involved in Murray's affairs.)

In July 1859, Murray sold Yarralumla, all its buildings and its livestock to Augustus Onslow Manby Gibbes in order to raise cash. He continued, however, to reside at Winderradeen, the sale of which his late wife's trustees blocked repeatedly, much to Murray's growing annoyance. Regrettably, the dispute over the protracted non-sale of Winderradeen eventually spilled over into the NSW Supreme Court in 1868, when Murray tried without success to oust the trustees and replace them with people more sympathetic to his needs. This acrimonious legal action widened an existing rift between Murray on the one hand, and Colonel Gibbes and his wife Elizabeth on the other. Mrs Gibbes was particularly hostile towards Murray because she felt that he had contributed to her daughter Mary's early death by keeping her sequestered away on his country properties, far from Sydney and the better standard of medical care that was available there. The Gibbes trustees had also said it was their duty not to rush into the sale of Winderradeen. By obtaining the best possible price for the property, they could purportedly maximise the benefits accruing to Mary's three surviving children—Leila Alexandrina Murray, Evelyn 'Mary' Murray and James 'Aubrey' Gibbes Murray.

Murray remarried in 1860, to governess Agnes Edwardes. They had two sons (see below). His financial position worsened during the mid-1860s when disease devastated his sheep flocks. He auctioned the contents of Winderradeen's library to pay off debts. At one point, Murray's creditors had bailiffs dispatched to Winderradeen to seize valuable items from the homestead. In fact, Murray was only saved from bankruptcy (and automatic removal from his seat in parliament) by the generosity of a few of his colleagues, who loaned him money. He remained in a tight fiscal position for the rest of his life. The trustees of Winderradeen finally consented to the sale of the property at the end of the 1860s, which perhaps reflected the changing situation for the Colonol and Mrs Gibbes, as well as Murray himself, who all died in the years following.

== Knighthood, final illness and death ==
Murray's financial travails did not hamper the effectiveness with which he discharged his public duties, and he had a knighthood conferred upon him by Queen Victoria in 1869 for his services to the parliament and the people of NSW. For a comprehensive account and assessment of Murray's administrative achievements, parliamentary activities and political attitudes, the best source remains Gwendoline Wilson's detailed 1968 biography, Murray of Yarralumla, published by Oxford University Press (Melbourne, London, Wellington and New York).

His health declined due to cancer and he was forced to take leave from parliament. In 1873, he died at a rented property, Richmond House, in the inner-Sydney suburb of Darlinghurst. He had endured his painful final illness with dignity and courage. Although baptised a Catholic, a faith that he never renounced, Murray had agreed shortly before his death to be interred in an Anglican churchyard when offered a burial plot at St Jude's, Randwick—in Sydney's eastern suburbs. Such an unorthodox arrangement was typical of Murray, who had consistently taken a non-sectarian approach to Christian worship.

== Children and second marriage ==
Murray was survived by three children from his first marriage to Mary Gibbes. They were:

- Leila Alexandrina Murray (1844–1901), rejected the practice of marriage as the subjugation of women, and worked for a time as a school teacher in Sydney for Lady Agnes Murray, her stepmother. She had also been the housekeeper of her uncle Augustus Onslow Manby Gibbes at Yarralumla. After Gibbes sold Yarralumla in 1881, she became his travelling companion on a nine-year-long tour around the UK and northern Europe. She spent the final few years of her life living on a small rural property near Goulburn, NSW.
- Evelyn Mary Fanny Matilda Murray (1849–1928), who, like her sister and father, was an expert rider and adept with firearms, from pastoral life. She married a sheep grazier, Robert Morrison, from Wellington, NSW, in 1874. She moved to England following her husband's death, and her daughter attended Cambridge University. Evelyn 'Mary' Morrison, and her daughter, also 'Mary', joined Pankhurst's suffragette movement in the early 1900s. Notably, Mary (Snr) was arrested with Pankhurst on Black Friday, whilst Mary (Jnr) was photographed wearing the suffrage sash, with Pankhurst, before the protest. She died in London.
- James Aubrey Gibbes Murray (1857–1933), known as 'Aubrey', a skilful draftsman, joined the NSW Department of Lands. His brother Gilbert described him as gentle and retiring. In 1882, he married Marion Edith Lewis in Sydney. They had a number of children, including: Hubert Hubert Leonard Murray, CBE, born in 1886; George Gilbert Murray born 1892, (Lance Corporal, AIF 17th Battalion) of 1 ANZAC Corps, who died in the Battle of Poelcappelle on 9 October 1917. Another of his sons, Dr Gerald Aubrey Murray, born 1890, was the Commonwealth Quarantine Officer and later the Chief Medical Officer of Western Australia; four of six of his sons enlisted in WW2, two in the RAAF and two as Australian Army medics. One, Terence Desmond Murray, born 1924, died in WW2 in flying combat in Hungary during Operation Gardening, whilst attached to the RAF 205 Group 150 Sqn.

In addition, Murray's first marriage produced three daughters who died in infancy. Christened Ayleen, Constance and Geraldine, they were all buried at Yarralumla.

Murray's first wife, Mary, had died in 1858, succumbing after the birth of her last child to heart failure and a severe infection. Mary Gibbes' reputed grandfather was the Duke of York, who was chronically affected by a stigmatized genetic disorder, Porphyria. Two years after this tragedy, on 4 August 1860, Murray married his children's English nanny/governess, Agnes Ann Edwards (1835–1891), at Winderradeen homestead. He would have a further two children with Agnes, who, incidentally, was a cousin of W. S. Gilbert of the celebrated Gilbert and Sullivan musical partnership. These children would both earn a degree of world fame when they grew up. They were:

- Sir John Hubert Plunkett Murray (1861–1940), who attended Oxford University and, on his return to Australia, served as a commissioned officer in the Boer War. In 1908, he became the highly regarded colonial administrator of Papua, dying in office shortly before the Japanese invasion during World War II.
- Dr Gilbert Murray (1866–1957), who became Regius Professor of Greek at Oxford University and, among other things, a participant in the drafting of the League of Nations Covenant. (Note: Professor Murray, whose full array of given names was George Gilbert Aimé, declined to accept a knighthood when one was offered by the King in 1912 but he accepted the Order of Merit in 1941.)

Following the loss of her husband in 1873, Lady Agnes Murray made ends meet by conducting a girls' school at Sydney's Potts Point. (Her stepdaughter, Leila Alexandrina Murray, was a member of the school's staff for a time.) She was also a founding committee member of the Sydney Foundling Hospital (now The Infants' Home Child and Family Services) a refuge for unmarried mothers and their children. Lady Murray's girls school did not thrive financially in the long run, however. She returned home to England, dying there in 1891.

== See also ==
- Members of the Legislative Council
- 1843-1851
- 1851–1856
- Election results for the Legislative Council
- 1843
- 1848
- 1851
- Members of the Legislative Assembly
- 1856-1858
- 1856-1858
- 1858-1859
- 1859-1860
- 1860-1864
- Election results for the Legislative Assembly
- 1856
- 1859
- 1860
- Members of the Legislative Council
- 1861–1864
- 1864–1869
- 1869–1872
- 1872–1874

Parliament of New South Wales
New South Wales Legislative Council
New district	Member for Counties of Murray, King and Georgiana; 1843–1851	Succeeded by James Chisholm as Member for Counties of King and Georgiana
New district	Member for Southern Boroughs; 1851–1856	Council abolished
New South Wales Legislative Assembly
New parliament	Member for Southern Boroughs; 1856–1859	District abolished
Preceded by Daniel Deniehy	Member for Argyle; 1859–1862	Succeeded by Samuel Emmanuel
Preceded by Sir Daniel Cooper	Speaker of the New South Wales Legislative Assembly; 1860–1862	Succeeded by John Hay
Political offices
Preceded by Bob Nichols	Auditor-General of New South Wales; August – October 1856	Succeeded by William Mayne
Preceded by Bob Nichols	Secretary for Lands and Works; August – October 1856	Succeeded by John Hay
Preceded by John Hay	Secretary for Lands and Works; September 1857 – January 1858	Succeeded by John Robertson
