= Hugh Wallace =

Scottish-born Australian politician (1808–1868)

Hugh Wallace (1808 – 7 June 1868) was a Scottish-born Australian politician.

He was born at Dumfries to solicitor William Wallace and his wife Mary. He married Mary Bowes around 1831. He migrated to New South Wales around 1841 and became a pastoralist and squatter, holding land in the Monaro district. From 1866 until his death at Braidwood in 1868, he was a member of the New South Wales Legislative Council.
