= James Mitchell (New South Wales politician) =

Scottish-born Australian surgeon and politician

James Mitchell (1789 or 1792 – 1 February 1869) was a Scottish-born Australian surgeon, businessman and politician.

== Personal life ==
He was born in Fife to farmer David Mitchell and Margaret Low. He arrived in Sydney on 15 July 1820. He married Augusta Maria Scott on 22 August 1833 and fathered three children. One of them was David Scott Mitchell. On 1 February 1869 he died at his house in Cumberland and received a private funeral at Rockwood Cemetery.

== Military career ==
In 1810 he joined the Army Medical Corps. With the army he spent nine years travelling around Spain, America, the Netherlands, the West Indies, and Australia. He served in several battles in the Peninsular War, Napoleonic Wars and American War including the Battle of New Orleans. He served in a Military hospital in Brussels during the Battle of Waterloo.

== Medical practice ==
In 1813 he became a member of the Royal College of Surgeons. He served as Assistant Surgeon of the 48th Regiment, including two visits to Australia. In 1823 he was appointed Assistant Surgeon of the Colonial Medical Staff and sent to work at Sydney Civil Hospital He was in charge of the hospital from 1825 until 1837 and was officially appointed surgeon on 1 January 1829. He was appointed the doctor to look after convicts at the Hyde Park barracks. He only lasted a few weeks due to being suspended for refusal to attend a flogging. A court of inquiry found him guilty of disobedience and his name was removed from the list of colonial surgeons. In 1845 he was elected to the medical board and became the president in 1852.

== Property ==
Mitchell was granted two lots, both 2,000 acres in Burragorang and Glendon Brook. He owned 1,300 acres of land in Gosford. He owned house of his estate Cumberland Place and in Hutchinson Street Surry Hills. He had land at Hunters Hills and Cooks River.

== Business dealings ==
In 1833 he became a director of the Bank of Australia until it failed in 1843. In 1843 he was appointed chairman of the Board of the Committee of Works. In 1852 he became a director of the Australian Mutual Provident Society. In 1853 he invested in Hunter River Railway Company. In 1853 he established the Newcastle Coal and Copper Co leasing his property at Burwood. He invested the Commercial Banking Company, the Australian Gas Light Company and the Australasian Stream Navigation. He became a director of the Australian Gas Light Company and appointed deputy chairman of directors for the Sydney Ferry Company.

== Political work ==
He was a non-elective member of the New South Wales Legislative Council from 1855 to 1856 and a member of the reconstituted body from 1856 to 1861 and from 1861 to 1869, when he died.

== Community work ==
He was a foundation member of the Australian Club which was formed on 29 May 1838. In 1838 he financed the Newcastle Mechanics Institute. In 1840 he established a school in Sydney on behalf of the Propagation of Christian Knowledge. Between 1853 and 1869 he served a trustee for the Australian Museum. He helped the Royal Exchange raise funds to support immigration. He was a member of the Central Committee of the Australian Immigration Association. He served as commissioner to the justice of peace. He was a benefactor of St Paul's College at the University of Sydney.
