= James Chisholm (merchant) =

Australian banker

James Chisholm (23 January 1772 – 31 March 1837) was an early settler in colonial Australia, contributing to its business, banking, Presbyterian church, education, democratic processes and pastoral industry. He was the first person of the name Chisholm to come to Australia and is considered the patriarch of the Clan Chisholm in that country. From being a private, then corporal (1798) and sergeant (1808), in the New South Wales Corps, he became a prominent merchant in Sydney. Chisholm was a founder and director of the Bank of New South Wales, a leader in the movement for democratic reform, a humanitarian benefactor, and one of the largest landholders in New South Wales.

== Early life and military service ==
Chisholm was born at Mid Calder, in the Scottish Lowlands some 15 miles west of Edinburgh, the third child of John Chisholm and his wife Isabel née Wilson, and was baptized at the kirk of Calder on 2 February 1772. His other siblings were Elizabeth (b. 1768), Alexander Hugh (1770–1850) and Mary (c. 1782–1835). On 14 November 1788, at the age of 16, Chisholm enlisted in the 29th Regiment of Foot with a letter of recommendation from either the Hon. Robert Sandilands or his cousin James Sandilands the Ninth Lord Torphichen, the local Baron and principal heritor of the kirk of Calder. He maintained correspondence with the Tenth Baron after his establishment in New South Wales. Chisholm transferred to the New South Wales Corps, commanded by Major Francis Grose, at Forton Barracks in Gosport, on 11 July 1790, with the rank of private and the occupation of "taylor".

== Master taylor of the New South Wales Corps (1791–1810) ==
James Chisholm travelled to New South Wales as part of the Third Fleet contingent of the New South Wales Corps, as a guard of convicts on the whaler Britannia, leaving Portsmouth on 27 March and arriving at Port Jackson on 14 October 1791. He was assigned to Major Francis Grose's Headquarters Company from the time of his arrival in the colony. In 1793, Chisholm assisted the Surveyor-General, Baron Augustus Alt, to set out town allotments along Spring Row (later George Street, Sydney). These lots, adjacent to the new Parade Ground and Barracks, were allocated to six non-commissioned members of the New South Wales Corps, including one for Chisholm himself, where he resided until 1821–22. At this time he undertook the duties of a tailor and by July 1798, when he was promoted to Corporal, became "master taylor" of the New South Wales Corps, operating this function from his establishment in Spring Row. Because of these duties, Chisholm did not have active involvement in the suppression of the Castle Hill Rebellion of 1804. On 26 January 1806, at the age of 34, he married the 21-year-old Mary Brown, daughter of the Scottish free settler David Brown. Later that year their son, James Chisholm Junior, was born. James Chisholm was illiterate at the time of his marriage but, under Mary's tutelage, was later able to read and write as early as 1808 when he was promoted to sergeant.

Chisholm was not a major player in the Rum Rebellion, which deposed Governor Bligh in January 1808. He was aligned with Lieutenant Colonel Joseph Foveaux, whom he claimed as a friend, and Lieutenant Colonel William Paterson, both of whom were opposed to the perpetrators of the Rebellion, principally Major George Johnston and John Macarthur. Governor Macquarie later favoured Chisholm for his loyalty to the Crown. Moreover, unlike the officers of the New South Wales Corps, there is no evidence that Chisholm was involved in the rum trade or any other private enterprise before 1808. However, in that year he commenced dealing as an agent in real estate and mortgage transactions, obtained his first rural land grant at the Eastern Farms and began trading in agricultural commodities. In February 1809, Chisholm purchased for £140 the lease on two town lots measuring "141 feet in front, 175 feet in length", previously owned by Sergeant-Major William Jamieson, and adjacent to his own land in Spring Row. On 5 March 1809, he obtained a licence to retail wine and spirits from Jamieson's former premises, later named the Crown and Thistle, a licence he held continuously until 1822.

== Merchant of Sydney (1810–1823) ==
With the arrival of Colonel Lachlan Macquarie as Governor of New South Wales, on 11 February 1810 James Chisholm requested and received his discharge from the army, after 21 years service. He never returned to military service nor the tailoring trade. With the support of Colonel Foveaux, Macquarie also renewed the leases to Chisholm's land in George Street (as Spring Row was renamed that year). Macquarie, in a concerted effort to shut down the rum trade, also restricted the number of persons licensed to retail spirits. Nevertheless, he granted James Chisholm one of only 20 liquor licenses issued on 16 February 1810. Chisholm then launched into a career as an importer and retailer of wine and spirits, a producer of rural produce for sale into the Commissariat, a trustee of deceased estates and mortgages, and a land agent and developer; as a consequence of his mercantile interests, he was an early agitator for monetary reform and the establishment of a colonial currency. He also began to accumulate town and country real estate in his own right, eventually spending some £12,000 on land and owning 23,000 acres stretching from the County of Cumberland to the Southern Tablelands. By the late 1820s Chisholm was one of the six largest landholders in New South Wales, and by the 1880s his descendants owned 3,125 square miles of Australia, stretching from the Gulf of Carpentaria to the state of Victoria. James Chisholm's Sydney real estate included a 379-foot frontage (a block of more than one acre) along the eastern side of George Street, the main thoroughfare of Sydney. With a few minor set-backs, the diversity of his business allowed him to weather the economic crisis of 1812–1815 and he became a wealthy and influential Sydney merchant.

Chisholm's first wife, Mary, died on 17 December 1817, aged only 32. Soon after, the 11-year-old James Chisholm Junior travelled to Calcutta, where he lived, worked, and received schooling, under the care of his father's business partner John Campbell Burton. In August 1818, while his son was away in India, Chisholm Senior, now 46, married his second wife the 21-year-old Mary Bowman (1796–1878), daughter of John and Honor Bowman of Archerfield, Richmond, New South Wales. The Bowmans had arrived as free immigrants on the Barwell in 1798.

In 1817, Chisholm was one of the "principal merchants" invited by Governor Macquarie to a meeting that led to the formation of Australia's first trading bank. In June 1822, Chisholm sold his spirits licence to Mary Reiby and leased his Crown and Thistle inn to the newly formed Bank of New South Wales, wherein it conducted business until 1853. He was an original shareholder in the bank and later became a director (1826). In 1821–22, Chisholm commenced building a country house on his 57-acre Newtown Farm, at what is today the suburb of Redfern. This he named Calder House, after the Torphichen mansion in Scotland, and it became his principal residence for the remainder of his life. Newtown Farm was chosen as the site for the Eveleigh Railway Workshops in 1875 and Calder House was destroyed by fire in 1923. In 1823, Chisholm also constructed a three-story stone townhouse, next to the Bank of NSW, at 85 George Street, Sydney.

== Religion, education, public service, politics and later life (1823–1837) ==
James Chisholm gave to public and private charitable institutions and served on their councils and committees. He was a reformed evangelical Christian, many of the charities he supported being sponsored by the Presbyterian Church, but he also supported the construction of the first Roman Catholic chapel in Hyde Park. Chisholm contributed to the establishment of Scots Church in Sydney (1826), and its associated religious-social schemes, principally through his loyalty to Rev. John Dunmore Lang (1799–1878). He was a founding trustee of the Sydney Public Free Grammar School of Dr Laurence Hynes Halloran (1824), and became a member of its management committee (1825), was a founding governor of Sydney College (1830), and a supporter, shareholder and councilor of Lang's Presbyterian School, Australian College (1831). In the field of assisted emigration, Chisholm was a committee member and treasurer of Lang's Emigrant's Friend Society (1832). In addition to his interests in the Bank of NSW, Chisholm was a founding shareholder in the Bank of Australia (July 1826), and later a trustee of the Savings Bank of NSW, which opened on 18 August 1832 at his three-story house next door to the trading bank.

Chisholm had long and active involvement in the colonial court system of NSW (1822–37): he was one of two members of the Governor's Court, appointed by Governor Macquarie (1822–23); and a member of the 'grand juries' and juries of the Quarter Sessions courts (1823–36), being their first Foreman (1824). He was prominent in initiatives for political change through his association with the reforms of William Charles Wentworth (1790–1872). He supported Wentworth in his campaigns for trial by jury, taxation reform and representative government in the form of an elected Legislative Assembly, being a founding member of the Australian Patriotic Association (1835). Although aligned with Lang and Wentworth, Chisholm was not a radical – his politics would appear conservative to modern observers – but in the context of colonial NSW they were democratic and reformist. Throughout his public service, he maintained his family and business interests, and remained loyal to his friends: as an example, along with his friend John Dickson, he provided co-surety of £6,000 for William Douglas Campbell in his legal suit against the estate of his former business partner, Garnham Blaxcell (1823–27). In 1827, Chisholm was granted 2,118 acres (9 km^{2}) of land in what is now Smithfield, and the village was initially called 'Chisholm's Bush'.

In 1834, the Colonial Secretary, Alexander Macleay, asked James Chisholm to justify his ownership of his land in George Street after a legal challenge from a descendant of William Jamieson. In this Chisholm was successful, and all the leases along the east side of George Street, between Hunter and King Street, were converted to freehold. A series of stores and tenements had been built on the George Street lots, with Chisholm's tenants providing him with rental income. He sold a small portion of this land in January 1836, but his family retained the remainder until the 1880s.

== Death ==
In March 1837, James Chisholm visited the house his eldest son had built at his property, Kippilaw, some 8 miles west of Goulburn, New South Wales. Here he caught a cold that turned to pneumonia. He was driven by carriage back to Calder House in Sydney, where he died on 31 March, aged 65. His second wife, his eldest son James Junior and seven children of his second marriage, the last child Edwin being born eight months before his death, survived him. Chisholm was initially buried on Newtown Farm, according to the rites of the Presbyterian Church, but the remains were moved with his first wife to St Stephen's Church of England Cemetery, Camperdown, in 1867, where they remain to this day. The inscription on his grave states that he departed this life "leaving a numerous family to lament their loss. He was a native of Scotland and upwards of 47 years a resident of this Colony, where he maintained a character which for simplicity of manner and integrity will long be remembered."

== Legacy ==
James Chisholm's legacy as a wealthy merchant, political reformer and landowner, was built upon by his descendants. His widow Mary Chisholm was a successful pastoralist and businesswoman in her own right. His eldest son James became a pioneer sheep breeder and woolgrower, an elected member of parliament for the seat of King and Georgiana (1851–56), voting for the Constitution Act, that conferred responsible government in NSW (1864), and a Legislative Councillor (1865–88). James Junior, his sons and his half-brother John William, expanded the Chisholm family land holdings over the Breadalbane Plains and beyond throughout the nineteenth century, eventually controlling two million acres of Australia.

== Sources ==
- Chown, Carolyn (1989). The Clan Chisholm in Australia, 1790–1990. St Ives NSW. ISBN 0731690559.
- Maxwell, Chis & Pugh, Alex (2015). The Merchant of Sydney: James Chisholm (1772–1837). Melbourne: Australian Scholarly Publishing. ISBN 9781925333282.
- Statham, Pamela, ed. (1992). A Colonial Regiment, NSW Corps 1789–1810. Canberra: Australian National University \year=1992. ISBN 0646081101.
- "Papers of Miriam Chisholm, 1817-1981", MS6207 [Series (S) 1 to 8, Folders (F) 1–103; 19 document boxes (B), 3 Folio boxes, 1817 – via National Library of Australia
- Evatt, H V (1938). Rum Rebellion: A Study of the Overthrow of Governor Bligh by John Macarthur and the New South Wales Corps. Sydney: Angus & Robertson.
- National Archives of the United Kingdom, "Description and Succession Books for the NSW Corps, 1808–1816", War Office Records (WO) 25/642, WO25/643
- National Archives of the United Kingdom, "Muster Books, Muster Rolls and Pay Lists of the 102nd Foot (NSW Corps) (1810–1812)", War Office Records (WO) 12/11018 (1791), WO 12/9904 (1807–09) & WO12/9905
- National Archives of the United Kingdom, "General Muster Books and Pay Lists of the 29th Foot 1st and 2nd Battalions, (1784–1797)", War Office Records (WO) 12/4494
- State Records of New South Wales, Colonial Secretary Papers, 1788–1825
