= Susannah Place =

Historic building in Sydney, Australia

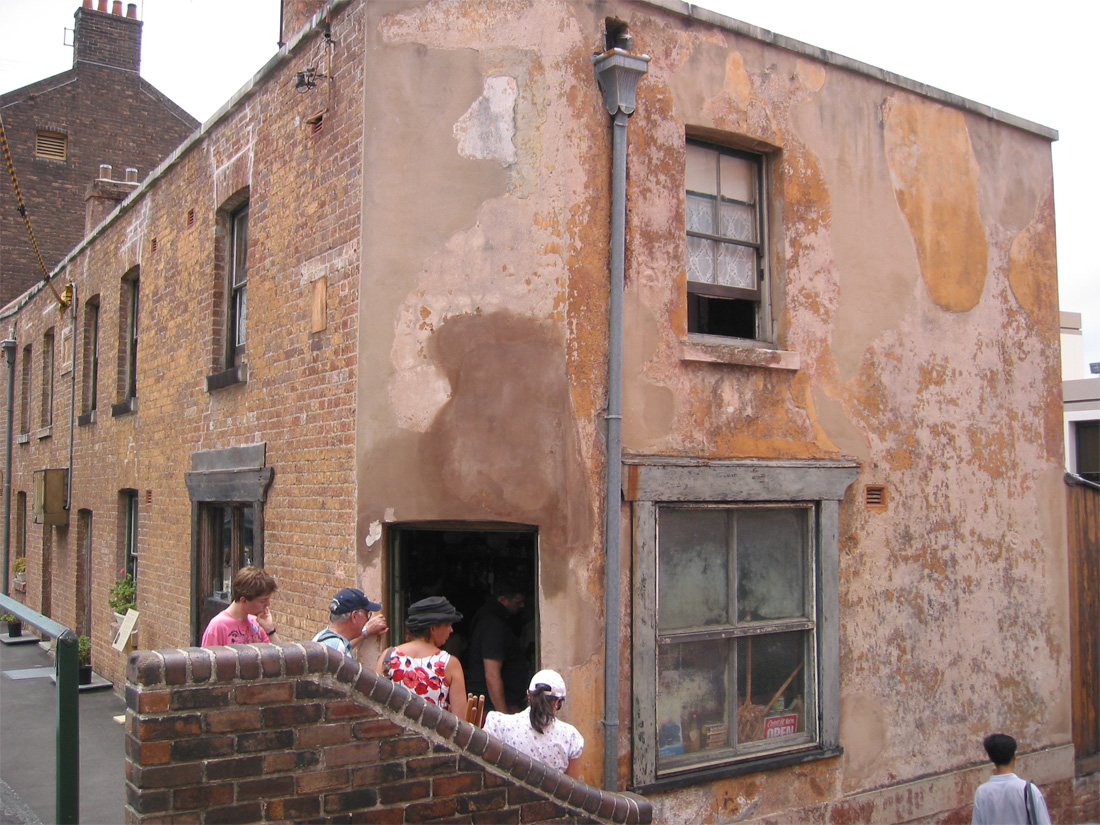

- Location within Sydney Location within Australia
- 33.8601°S 151.2074°E
- Location: 58–64 Gloucester Street, The Rocks, City of Sydney, New South Wales, Australia

History
- Built: 1844

Site notes
- Architectural style: Victorian Georgian
- Governing body: Museums of History NSW
- Owner: Property NSW
- Website: sydneylivingmuseums.com.au/susannah-place-museum

New South Wales Heritage Register
- Official name: Susannah Place; Susannah Place Museum; Susannah Terrace
- Type: State heritage (built)
- Designated: 10 December 1999
- Reference no.: 1310
- Type: Terrace
- Category: Residential buildings (private)

Susannah Place is a heritage-listed former grocery store and workers' cottages and now historic house museum located at 58–64 Gloucester Street in the inner city Sydney suburb of The Rocks in the City of Sydney local government area of New South Wales, Australia. It was built during 1844. It is also known as Susannah Place Museum. The property is owned by Property NSW and managed by Museums of History NSW, agencies of the Government of New South Wales. It was added to the New South Wales State Heritage Register on 10 December 1999.

Susannah Place had domestic occupants until 1990 and the former cottages and store serve as an evolution of Western occupation over 160 years, especially the urban working class community.

== History ==
The early site ownership is confused by a convoluted set of claims and counter claims from the 1830s tracing back to 1816 and two men; William Walsh and Dennis Conway, each of whom owned a building on the site. In 1815 Walsh acquired a publican's license and the Memorials allude to an inn called The Duke Wellington on the site. Not long after, Walsh succeeded in securing an indenture in which Dennis Conway "did assign bargain transfer and make over to the said William Walsh...all that dwelling house situate lying and being No. 6 Gloucester Street, Sydney".

In May 1834, long after the death of both men, Conway's grandson, John Norman, disputed William Walsh Junior's ownership of the site. After obtaining evidence from witnesses about the event of 15 years earlier, the Commissioner for Claims found in favour of Norman. After the claim had been settled, the site was purchased by Walsh Jnr's widow, Harriet Walsh, however, by December 1835, the Sheriff forced her to sell her property due to financial difficulties. The purchaser was ex-convict James Byrne who acquired the land and buildings for £220. A map of Section 76 by Robert Russell dated 3 January 1838 indicates the presence of two structures on the site. The larger of the two structures occupies the northern section of the site. The building is constructed to the Gloucester Street boundary and to the slightly kinked northern site boundary. Annotations on the plan note "James Byrne, claimant Harriet Walsh". Details on a map held at the Land Titles Office also confirms Harriet Walsh's claim to this land located in City Section 76. Both Byrne and Walsh owned land on the other side of Gloucester Street. Byrne, a licensed victualler, died in 1838 and left all his property to his wife.

In 1842 Sarah Byrne was forced to sell most of the land she inherited including St Patrick's Inn and the Gloucester Street site by public auction. In July of the same year Edward Riley purchased land in The Rocks that one source notes included a "six-room cottage with a yard" for £450. Another source notes that Susannah Place replaced a semi-detached pair of single storey cottages constructed in the rock ledge above Cambridge Street. However, by 1844 the building(s) had been demolished and four houses constructed. The 1845 City Council Rate Assessment Book notes the new buildings "with basement kitchens" owned by Edward Reilly (sic) and occupied by John Munro (shop), Thomas Hall, Francis Cunningham and James Macknell. It is not clear who the actual builder of the terrace was, although it is thought to have been Riley; he owned the building when it was completed and tenanted but when he acquired the land is unknown.

Edward Riley and his wife Mary were assisted immigrants who arrived in Sydney in 1838. They were accompanied by their nineteen year old niece, Susannah Sterne (also referred to as Susannah Stere or Sterne). The shipping list described Edward as a thirty year old farmer from Wexford and his wife, aged thirty-one, as a nursery governess. Their niece was described as a milliner from County Carlow. All three were sponsored by Mr John Marshall, who also sponsored most of the other 245 passengers aboard HMS Amelia Thompson. Little is known about the family's life in the colony. Edward Riley's transition from assisted immigrant to owner of four houses in six years and in a depressed economy is intriguing. Edward Riley died in 1853 and Mary became the owner of the terraces. As owner and occupant of the place for nearly thirty years, Mary would have provided a constant and stable presence, contrary to the absentee landlords, common in The Rocks during this period. Tenants in the other houses left and returned regularly in the period up until 1874. Apparently people who lived elsewhere in the street moved in when there was a vacancy.

It is thought that Susannah Place was connected to the water supply and sewer during Mary Riley's ownership. On her death Mary Riley left the shop and adjacent terrace to her "grand-daughter" Mary Ann Hensley and the other two houses to the Anglican Church. Mary Ann was in fact the daughter of Mary's niece, Susannah. Mary Ann married John Finnegan In October 1874 and the Finnegan's ran the grocers shop between 1876 and 1877. By 1886 they had moved to Granville. All four houses were then tenanted. Susannah Place did not change hands again until after it was resumed by the government under the Darling Harbour Wharves Resumption Act in 1900, after the outbreak of plague. The resumption does not appear to have altered the tenancy pattern.

Cumberland Street and Gloucester Street were realigned during the early 1900s and the level of Gloucester Street was raised. This resulted in changes to Cumberland Place, and Cambridge Street virtually disappearing. The rear yards of numbers 58-62 were extended across what had been that street. Around 1911 and 1912 terraces were built around Susannah Place and the Australian Hotel was rebuilt on the corner of Cumberland Place and Cumberland Street. In the 1930s the Maritime Services Board became the landlords for the area. Again there appears to have been no change in the tenancy pattern.

When the Sydney Cove Redevelopment Authority (SCRA) took control of the property only three of the four residences were occupied. All the residents received notification that their houses would be affected by the Authority's redevelopment scheme in November 1971 and that they would be relocated to neighbouring Housing Commission developments or other properties under the Authority's control. One family, the Andersens at No 58, remained until 1974, Mr R. W. Smith who had been at number 64 since 1955 stayed until 1976. The Marshalls in number 62 remained at Susannah Place until 1990 and took on the role of unofficial caretakers. Agreement between the Rocks Resident Action Group and the Builders' Labourers Federation saw the imposition of a "Green Ban" on the area - the third in Sydney, but the first in a working-class neighbourhood and the first with the State government as opponent.

In January 1978 the SCRA received a quote to demolish Susannah Place as it was one of a group of buildings to be demolished having been perceived as being at the end of their "economic lives and standing on sites required for redevelopment". In 1986 the Historic Houses Trust of New South Wales became interested in Susannah Place and the NSW Premier, Neville Wran reaffirmed that the Trust should acquire the property as a matter of "critical significance to the State's heritage". Negotiations began to lease the property as the freehold could not be transferred. Conservation work began on the site in 1987 as a joint project between the SCRA and the Trust. In 1988 the SCRA became the Sydney Cove Authority, signifying shifts away from the push towards maximum redevelopment of The Rocks, although not a halt to development. The Clock Tower development has obliterated the views of the harbour from Susannah Place, an important feature of the property.

Major conservation and repair works carried out by SCA in 1992. When restoration works commenced, the primary tasks involved the stabilisation of the plasterwork, repair of leaking parapets and guttering, the removal and replacement of white ant infested timber and the upgrading of the drainage services. Restoration works were completed in 1992 at a total cost of $250,000. Susannah Place was then handed over to the Historic Houses Trust of NSW, who undertook an interpretive fitout and opened it as a house museum. The museum included the recreation of the corner shop to the 1910-1920s.

A new project to recreate the Hughes family's 1919 era bedroom at Susannah Place is part of Sydney Living Museums' ongoing interpretation strategy to tell real stories of the houses and their occupants while maintaining the integrity of the buildings' surviving fabric.

=== Archaeological history ===
Granted as Lot 1, Section 76 of 10 perches to James Byrne. Susannah Place is a row of four terrace houses, one also serving as a shop, constructed in 1844. Harpers map of 1823 indicates structures here by that date although their history has not been fully researched. The conservation works were part of a stabilisation program whereby the terrace was handed over to the Historic Houses Trust for use as a house-museum. The terrace has been interpreted as an archaeological resource in itself, revealing to visitors the changes that have occurred to its fabric over its lifetime.

== Description ==
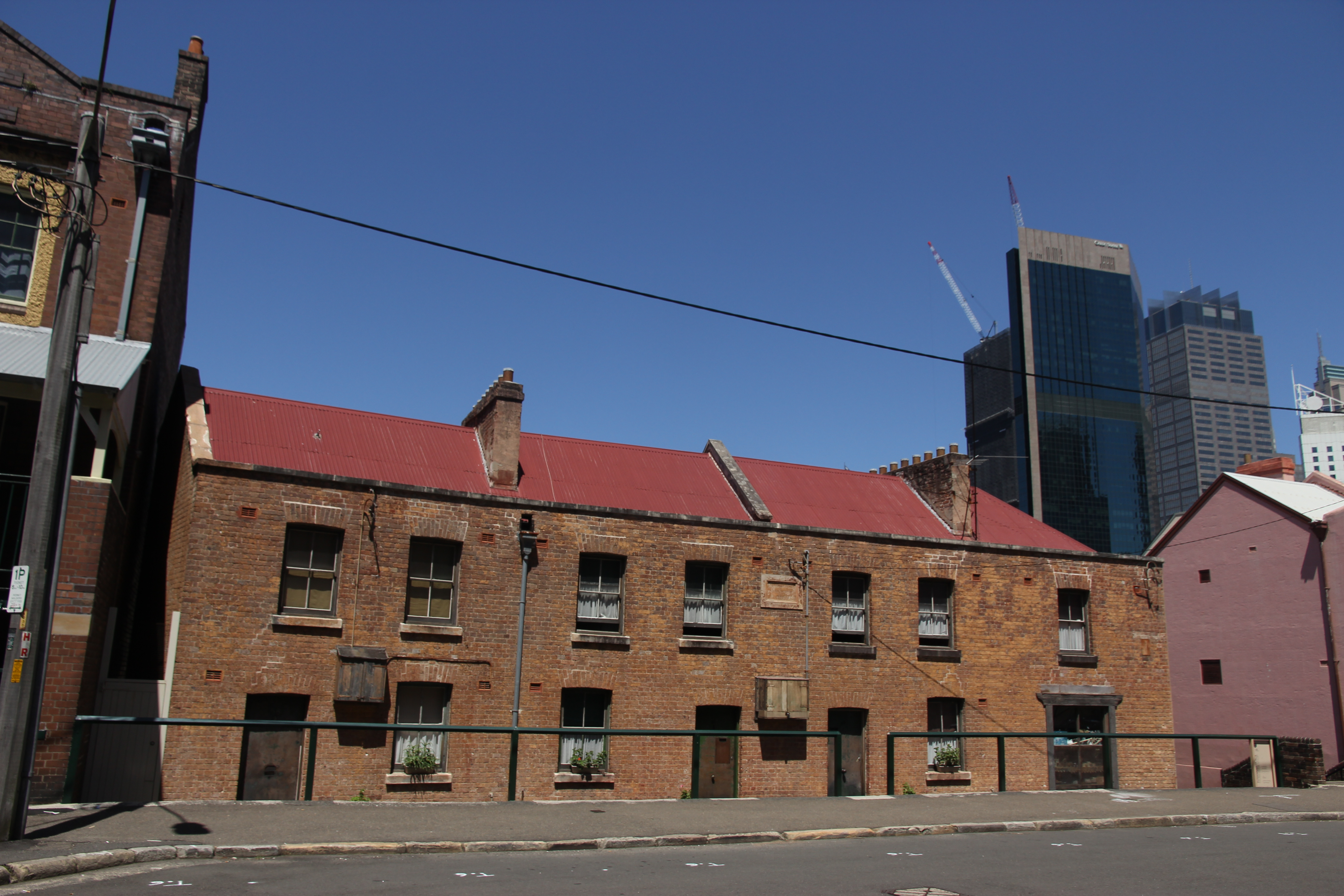
Susannah Place terrace houses as viewed from Gloucester Street in 2019. The shop is the terrace on the right.

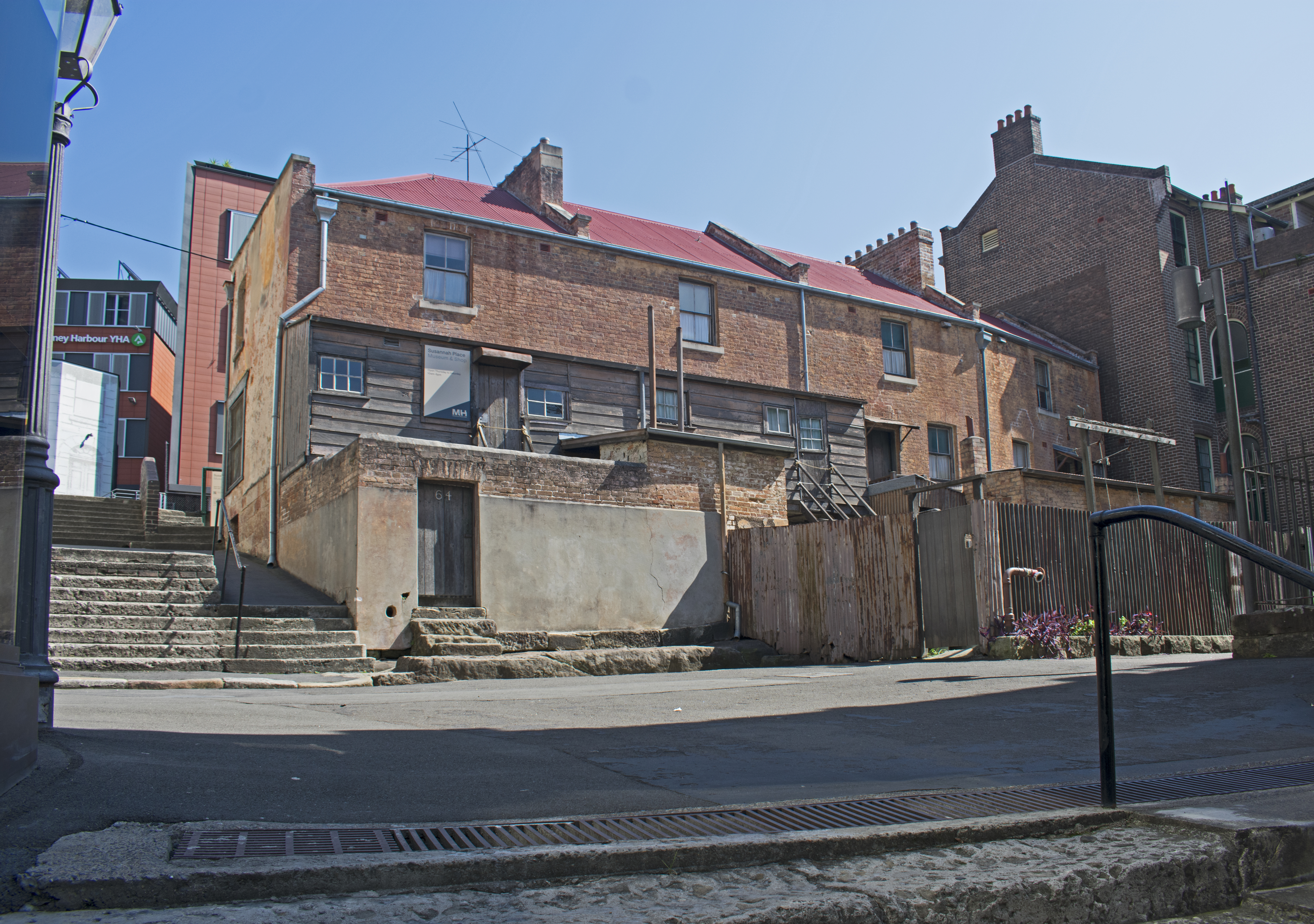
Susannah Place Museum seen from below

Susannah Place is a small early Victorian Georgian terrace row of four dwellings which includes a former corner shop. It is bounded on the north by a row of terraces built In 1912, on the west by Gloucester Street, on the east by Cambridge Street and on the south by Cumberland Place. The present level of Gloucester Street is four steps higher than the area immediately in front of Susannah Place and the ground floor level in the houses is another step below this.

Susannah Place ‘is very similar to a class of London houses that featured simple pattern of openings and detailing.’ It is made up of four multi-level terraces, with a two-storey façade facing onto Gloucester Street and a three-storey façade facing onto Cambridge Street and Cumberland Place. The building is on a sandstone foundation, with external brick walls in colonial bond and internal walls brick nogged. The roof line is hidden by a sandstone-capped parapet, in the fashion of the day. There is an inscription on the Gloucester Street (western) elevation which reads "Susannah Place Anno Domini 1844".

Each house was originally built with six rooms over three levels, with the kitchen in the basement and external outhouses. Originally, the rooms of the first floor were the bedrooms, whilst the rooms on the ground floor were used as parlours and dining rooms. Currently, the majority of rooms have been retained to certain eras, based on the information and history known about the families and also the surviving details. The houses are a source of the changes of technology in the area, as seen by the ‘shift from dependence for water upon community pumps in the streets to piped water; and from the used of oil, candles, wood and coal to gas and electricity for light, cooking and heating.’

Susannah Place is built of colonial bond brickwork on a rock-faced sandstone site. The basements are cut into the bedrock of the sloping site, The brickwork to the Cumberland Place elevation and the splay to the south western corner have been rendered. However, there is evidence of painted shop signs below the base coat of render. All other brickwork is face brickwork and painted. Window sills, parapet copings and upstands are of dressed sandstone. The main internal traverse walls are brick nogged; subsidiary walls are boarded with wider cedar lining boards of irregular widths.

Susannah Place is irregularly shaped with a kink at the junction of numbers 58 and 60. The northern wall is angled. The building is simply proportioned. The doors to Gloucester Street are six-panelled while the internal doors and external doors to the rear are ledged and sheeted. The original shingle roof was replaced with corrugated iron in the latter quarter of the nineteenth century. Timber ground floor additions at the back are of Oregon, Baltic Pine and Redwood.

=== Condition ===
As at 11 March 2009, the property was decayed but stabilised. The finishes and fabric are largely intact. Archaeology is partly disturbed.

Archaeology Assessment Condition: Partly disturbed. Assessment Basis: Terraced into hill slope. Archaeological excavation in 1992 concentrated mainly on No 60, consisting of small trenches in the basement, a trench in the rear yard and another at the Gloucester St footpath, all sited according to the schedule of conservation works. In the final stages of conservation works, staff of the Historic Houses Trust removed sub-floor deposits from some areas in the upper floor. It is believed these were later replaced "in situ". The archaeological investigations have further identified the extent of the resource on the site. Investigation: Conservation Plan, Watching Brief.

=== Modifications and dates ===
The following modifications are known to have taken place to the shop and/or cottages:

- c. 1885 – Running water connected
- c. 1858 – Connection to sewer line
- c. 1880 – Timber addition to rear of numbers 62 & 64
- c. 1877–1900 – Shingle roofing replaced by corrugated iron
- c. 1911–12 – Rear yards of numbers 58-62 extended across what had been Cambridge Street
- c. 1920s – Partly open laundry and corrugated iron bathroom facilities built
- c. 1940s – Basement kitchens in 62 and 64 relocated to timber addition
- c. 1945–1950 – Chip heaters installed

== Conservation as a museum ==
In 1987, a joint project between the Historic Houses Trust of New South Wales and the Sydney Cove Authority was established to conserve the terrace houses. The conservation work focuses on preserving and conserving, rather than recreating, so all restorative work is fully documented and where possible, reversible. The terraces contrast with many other restored houses because it retains old materials rather than recreating them from new ones. Susannah Place aims to ‘preserve the evidence of the building’s use and its adaptation to the changing needs of its occupants over 150 years.’

A conservation management plan places exceptional importance on retaining the character of the building, stating the need to ‘retain overall form, scale and character of the exterior and character of the ground, first floor levels’. One example of creating a museum in the making include leaving the front room on the ground floor of no. 58 ‘as found’, which hadn't been occupied since 1974 and the only changes were essential repairs.

== Tenants ==
The history of Susannah Place’s occupancy has been put together through oral histories and contextual research. Some of the families and people that lived in each of the four houses are listed below:

=== No. 58 ===
Thomas Hughes and his family lived here between 1916 and 1929. Between 1934 and 1974, the house was occupied by John and Adelaide (Ada) Gallagher, then their daughter Mary Anderson with her husband Martin and two sons, the younger son, Ernie, then living in the house until 1974. The house had no more tenants after that.

=== No. 60 ===
The first tenants of this house were Ellen and Francis Cunninghame, who arrived in Australia from Glasgow on 8 February 1840 on the ship The Arkwright. Documents from that time indicate that he had been sponsored by A B Smith & Co., and lived here between 1844 and 1845. During this time, Ellen Cunninghame gave birth to two children first a son Francis and then another daughter, Ellen when living in No. 60. In 1848 Francis joined with Edward Hawskley to establish the radical newspaper The People's Advocate and New South Wales Vindicator.

The house was then run as a lodging house in 1865 by William Merchant, with most tenants being of maritime occupations due to the close proximity of Susannah Place to the docks. Dorothea, Arthur and Emmanuel Sarantides lived in this house between 1934 and 1946. Evidence of their occupancy is shown through the kitchen on the ground floor, which was recreated based on Dorothea’s grandchildren’s recollections of visiting their grandmother after school.

=== No. 62 ===
House no. 62 was originally occupied by the builders and owners, Edward and Mary Riley. They arrived as Irish immigrants to the colony with Susannah Sterne who was Mary's daughter by her first marriage in Clonigal, Ireland and whom the terraces are named after. The property was purchased for £450, a valuable amount, and was an incredible feat for the Rileys after arriving only four years earlier and dealing with the depression of the 1840s. Another tenant of the no. 62 was Ellen and Dennis Marshall, who lived in the house for 28 years between 1962 and 1990. They remained as unofficial caretakers for many years, as the other terraces were no longer occupied, the last tenants of the other houses moving out by 1976.

=== No. 64 ===
A small grocer shop selling food and essential household items was included in this house during the construction and is now the entrance to the museum as well as a working shop. The first tenant was James Munro, who was a ginger beer maker and lived there in 1845. Another tenant of the corner shop was George Hill, who moved there in 1879 and fell into debt 8 years later. He remained there until 1898 after reselling his stock and furniture to repay debts. After being sold to Eliza and Robert Sneddon in 1931, the store was run until 1935 when their departure also meant the end of the shop. Later tenants include Mary Carmichael between 1949 and 1954, and the last tenant, Ronald Smith who arrived in 1965 and left in 1972.

=== Current shop ===
Through oral histories, a current shop has been established in the 1920s era, modelled after recollections of Jim Young. He was the son of Hugo and Clara Youngein, who were the tenants of the shop between 1904 and 1930.

== Heritage listing ==
As at 26 June 2002, Susannah Place, Nos. 58-64 Gloucester Street is of State significance for its historic, aesthetic, scientific and social values. The site and buildings are significant for their contribution to the character and qualities of the precinct and are significant for their contribution to The Rocks. Susannah Place is a rare example of a simple working class 1840s terrace in The Rocks and wider area, which has undergone few alterations despite major changes of ownership and social infrastructure since its construction.

Susannah Place significantly retains fabric and physical evidence of its continuous occupation since 1844. The buildings were constructed for the rental market, but were also initially owner-occupied for over thirty years which may have also contributed to the good standard of construction and care of the buildings. The survival of the buildings through the cleansing operations of the early 1900s is largely due to its sound construction and adherence to building codes introduced in the late 1830s. Since their construction the buildings have continued to be occupied by a number of tenants under landlords such as the Church of England, Sydney Harbour Trust and Maritime Services Board. The buildings significantly survived the development pressures of the 1970s due to the work of local resident action groups and remaining tenants in the building. As such the buildings have high social value which is enhanced by the extant fabric and archaeological resources found on the site which tell much of the lives of the occupants and development and changes in The Rocks in general. Susannah Place is of historical and technological significance as it demonstrates early 19th century construction techniques and finishes and a vernacular domestic style in the adaption of the standard terrace form and adherence to the building codes of the 1830s. The buildings provide evidence of how the working classes lived from the 1840s and this ongoing use and occupation also provides much research potential. The terraces are prominent elements in the area and make a positive contribution to the Gloucester and Cambridge Street streetscapes and Cumberland Place. Susannah Place was listed on the New South Wales State Heritage Register on 10 December 1999 having satisfied the following criteria.

The place is important in demonstrating the course, or pattern, of cultural or natural history in New South Wales.

Susannah Place is historically significant as a good and largely intact terrace dating from the 1840s that demonstrates the development of a housing form, building and servicing technology of this period. The buildings are historically significant as they have had relatively few alterations in their 160 year history and retain evidence of their ongoing use and occupation. The site of Susannah Place is significant as it demonstrates the changes in town planning in the precinct through the changing street levels in Gloucester Street and changing Gloucester and Cambridge Street alignments. Susannah Place reflects aspects of Australian History with evidence of works undertaken as a result of the outbreak of the plague to realignment of the street frontage in part due to preparation works for the construction of the Sydney Harbour Bridge. The terraces are representative of relatively simple, speculative developments which were also initially owner-occupied which may attribute to the level of servicing and maintenance of the buildings. They significantly survived the demolitions and cleansing operations that followed the plague of 1900, due to their construction and adherence to building codes of the late 1830s, and more recent redevelopment pressures in the 1970s due to the actions of the local resident action groups and their supporters. Susannah Place as educational value as a resource for the interpretation of the history and development of area and the people who lived here and living standards through the various phases of development.

The place has a strong or special association with a person, or group of persons, of importance of cultural or natural history of New South Wales's history.

Susannah Place is associated with a known progression of owners and tenants from the working and lower middle classes with owners ranging from owner-occupiers to the Church of England and a history of public housing under government bodies who administered the buildings. These comprise the Sydney Harbour Trust, Maritime Services Board, Sydney Cove Redevelopment Authority and Sydney Cove Authority. The buildings are now associated with Sydney Harbour Foreshore Authority and Historic Houses Trust of NSW.

The place is important in demonstrating aesthetic characteristics and/or a high degree of creative or technical achievement in New South Wales.

Susannah Place is a rare example of a simple terrace that demonstrates early 19th century construction techniques and finishes and a vernacular domestic style in the adaption of the model form of terrace housing to suit the sloping site and incorporation of basement level in lieu of rear service wings and treatment of the rear of the buildings. The use of solid building materials, stone and brick, and incorporation of party walls that extend beyond the roof line that created separation between each of the dwellings also indicates adherence to the newly introduced building codes of the day. The form of the building, lack of garden and incorporation of a corner shop in the building also represents a shift in the style of residential accommodation during this period and change in living standards as the land in the area became more developed and densely populated with locals relying on small stores instead of cottage gardens. The terraces are prominent elements in the Gloucester and Cambridge Street streetscapes primarily due to their modest scale and location on Cumberland Place. They are the only survivors from the early Victorian development of the area and make a positive contribution to varied character and nature of the precinct.

The place has a strong or special association with a particular community or cultural group in New South Wales for social, cultural or spiritual reasons.

Susannah Place has had continuous life since 1844 as a cluster of working class residences in a closely knit working-class neighbourhood within a city area that has undergone periodic physical transformations. It demonstrates the way of life, architecture and attitudes of Its working class occupants dating to the 1840s. Susannah Place is significant for its evidence of, and ability to demonstrate, domestic and family life and the role of The Rocks' urban working class In the 19th and 20th centuries. Susannah Place demonstrates a high standard of pride in its occupants despite being rental accommodation. This significance is enhanced by the number of people who have an intimate knowledge of the property and the way of life played out in it. The social significance of the place is enhanced by the oral histories compiled that indicate that the place has special significance to a number of former residents of the buildings and The Rocks area in general. The Historic Houses Trust has released a book "A Place in The Rocks" that is specifically about Susannah Place and its inhabitants.

The place has potential to yield information that will contribute to an understanding of the cultural or natural history of New South Wales.

Susannah Place is largely intact as such demonstrates the architecture of the 1840s and domestic standards, spatial requirements and way of life and attitudes of its occupants from this time. The changes to the surrounding area, the front street alignment and rear site boundaries also demonstrate changes in the local urban planning and development of the area. The grounds and environs contain a unique resource for interpretation of these changes. The finishes and fabric of the buildings provide a valuable resource and reference to the type of interior decorations common to working-class houses. The buildings have now been interpreted and significantly demonstrate the domestic and local life in the 19th and 20th centuries.

The place possesses uncommon, rare or endangered aspects of the cultural or natural history of New South Wales.

Susannah Place is a rare surviving example of an intact simple terrace which has had few alterations since 1844. There are a number of terraces constructed in the mid to late 19th century remaining in The Rocks area, however, these vary in scale and detail, have undergone alterations and some are now used as commercial premises.

The place is important in demonstrating the principal characteristics of a class of cultural or natural places/environments in New South Wales.

Susannah Place is significant as a row of working class residences dating from the 1840s that demonstrates a continuity of occupation, domestic family and local life, tastes and circumstances over the past 160 years.

== See also ==
- Australian residential architectural styles
- Historic house museum
- 46-56 Gloucester Street
- Baker's Terrace, 66-72 Gloucester Street
