= Baker's Terrace =

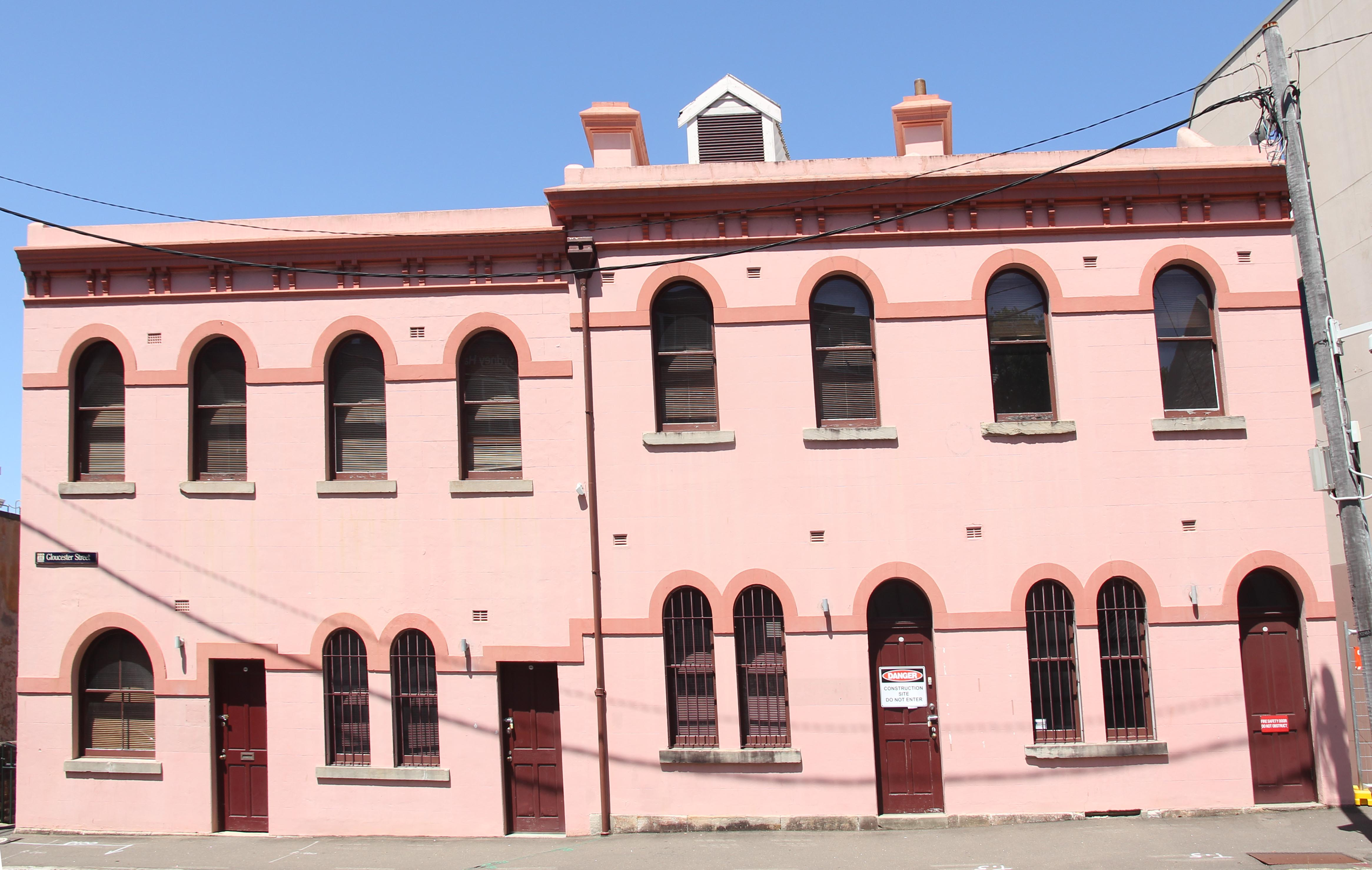
- Baker's Terrace, pictured in 2019.

- Location within Sydney Location within Australia
- 33.8605°S 151.2075°E
- Location: 66–68 and 70–72 Gloucester Street, The Rocks, City of Sydney, New South Wales, Australia

History
- Built: 1875
- Built for: William Andrews and Edward Baker

Site notes
- Owner: Property NSW

New South Wales Heritage Register
- Official name: Baker's Terrace; Bakers Terrace
- Type: State heritage (built)
- Designated: 10 May 2002
- Reference no.: 1530 & 1531
- Type: Terrace
- Category: Residential buildings (private)

Baker's Terrace are heritage-listed commercial office buildings and former terrace houses located at 66–68 and 70–72 Gloucester Street, in the inner city Sydney suburb of The Rocks in the City of Sydney local government area of New South Wales, Australia. It was built during 1875 for William Andrews and Edward Baker. It is also known as Bakers Terrace. The property is owned by Property NSW, an agency of the Government of New South Wales. It was added to the New South Wales State Heritage Register on 10 May 2002.

== History ==
Available historical information suggests the subject site was in use for residential purposes by the start of the 19th century. Initially this may have been for a freestanding building, but from the 1830s the historical maps suggest the area was largely terrace style housing.

In 1807, this site is shown by Meehan's survey to contain what appears to be a well defined building line to the west and a lane on the northern boundary. Artists' representations of the area from as early as 1803 reveal many small houses in the general vicinity. By 1835, the date of Russell's survey, the site was known as allotment 1A (Nos. 66–68) of section 77 in the Town of Sydney. This allotment was originally one parcel with allotment 1B (Nos. 70–72) to the south. It was granted to Johanna Davis by the Court of Claims Commissioners appointed in 1835 having been claimed originally by the children of Richard Porter. Court of Claims records indicate that this site (allotment 1A & 1B) had been occupied for some years prior to 1819 and since that date by a chain of purchasers. In 1837, Denis Murphy claimed the northern half of the site (1A) which, on Russell's survey, possessed a building which occupies most of the site. Mrs Davies retained allotment 1B (70–72) and in 1845 Council Rate Assessors noted Denis Murphy as the Proprietor and Patrick Ryan the tenant of a two-room stone house with a shingled roof in "bad repair (with) no outhouses". They also noted two small stone cottages with shingled roofs on the site: the northernmost containing two rooms, the other three. Both were described as in "bad repair (with) no outhouses". The width of the building was measured as 26 feet and the depth14 feet. From 1851-c. 1870, John Sims was the proprietor and in this period the building was continually described as an old house in bad repair. By the 1865 Trigonometrical Survey, the site contained four residential buildings, numbered 46, 48, 50 and 52 Gloucester Street. The Sands Directories for this period indicate a large number of residents in the street. Those listed with occupations are usually tradesmen or worked in the maritime industries. In 1871 no entry is recorded for the site. In 1877, William Andrews is noted as the owner of a two-storey brick terrace of two houses, each with five rooms.

The northern two houses, 46 and 48, were generally tenanted throughout the period recorded by the Sands Directories. 50 and 52 were sometimes untenanted and no tenants were recorded in No. 50 between 1863 and 1871, when the site is noted as "vacant land". This is consistent with the rate records indicating at least some of the buildings on the site were in poor repair. No tenants are recorded for the year 1881, consistent with the buildings being demolished for the construction of Baker's Terraces.

In 1880 Edward Baker was the owner and though the evidence for this is not clear, according to Dove's 1880 plan of the area, the buildings at No. 50 and 52 are single storey and set further west, out of alignment with the row of buildings. Baker may have merely demolished the single storey buildings and constructed two new buildings. The different roof pitch and the presence of the box gutter in the northern two buildings suggest this may be the case. The buildings were later unified through a new façade on Gloucester Street. Between 1880 and 1882, Baker purchased the two adjoining properties to the south and erected two brick terraces on these. Between 1882 & 1887 Baker added new fronts to his original terraces so that the four became a matched unit. At this later date the terrace was known as Baker's Terrace. The terrace has remained essentially unaltered from that date and was tenanted as a residential unit until 1976. In 1890, the street was renumbered and Baker's Terrace became Nos. 66, 68, 70 and 72.

In 1988–89, the terraces at 68-72 Gloucester Street, were adapted for use as a restaurant and office, as part of the seven storey Harrington Court development designed by Mitchell Giurgola Thorp at 77-95 Harrington Street, on the site bounded by Harrington Street, Cumberland Place, Gloucester Street and the Cahill Expressway. In 1989, the Harrington Court development was leased for a period of 99 years.

== Description ==
Style: Victorian Terrace; Storeys: Two; Roof Frame: Iron (possibly slate original).

The two buildings are two pairs of terrace houses which are joined to each other. The two pairs of buildings read as similar buildings to the street, however have different forms and features behind the façade and to the rear (Cambridge Street – Cumberland Place). The front of 66–68 was rebuilt 1880s to match the new terrace pair at 70–72 Gloucester Street.

The building presents an ashlar rendered masonry parapet wall to Gloucester Street, all doors and windows have arched heads, defined by a rendered string course. The window and door joinery appears to have been replaced to original/traditional detail, and the door frames are possibly original fabric. The parapet wall has a prominent cornice supported on Italianate style paired brackets. There are two dormer gables to the roof, which are traditional in form, but do not appear to be original. The decorative rendered chimneys appears to be original.

The rear of the building appears largely in original form, although the rear yard has been incorporated into the landscaping of the public pedestrian area. The interiors were not inspected.

=== Condition ===
As at 21 April 2000, the terrace is in very good condition as a result of the work carried out in the late 1980s.

Archaeology Assessment Condition: Partly disturbed. The terraces were renovated and restored in the late 1980s, however the brief held instructions to prevent any removal or destruction of artefacts, or the return to the Authority of any which had to be removed. During the works fill was introduced to the site, and concrete was underlain with polyethylene film which may seal archaeological deposits. It appears the only excavation necessary was minimal required for the upgrading of services to the buildings.

=== Modifications and dates ===
- c. 1885 – New fronts
- 1988–89 – Adaptation for restaurant and office use as part of the Harrington Court development.

== Heritage listing ==
As at 20 January 2009, Baker's Terrace and site are of State heritage significance for their historical and scientific cultural values. The site and building are also of State heritage significance for their contribution to The Rocks area which is of State Heritage significance in its own right. The site has been continually occupied since very early settlement and has strong associations with the early grants and subsequent developments on the site and The Rocks generally. This terrace is a good example of both the terrace style of residential development and the subdivision patterns that occurred in the mid Victorian period of Sydney particularly in The Rocks precinct. The rear of the buildings reflect the architectural response to the sloping topography of The Rocks. Baker added new fronts to the adjoining terraces to the north such that the four terraces became one unit in appearance. This addition is aesthetically interesting, it is a unique surviving example of such practice in The Rocks and it is deemed rare in Sydney and NSW terms. By 1887 they were known as Baker's Terrace. The terrace has remained essentially unaltered from 1887 and was tenanted as a residential unit until 1976/77. The site's changing use reflects the urban, economic and social development of the area. It also reflects the working and lower middle class lifestyles of the early twentieth century and the two storey scale of the area which predominated in the pre bridge area.

Bakers Terrace is held in high esteem as indicated by its listing on the registers of both the National Estate and National Trust, and thus is recognised by an identifiable group and has importance to the wider community.

Bakers Terrace hold social significance for the local residents of The Rocks including Millers Point who have fought hard for the retention of the built fabric of The Rocks and for their right to continue living in the area. In addition, it has a special significance for those who campaigned vigorously with the residents against plans for the areas full scale redevelopment. It has special value to historians and heritage professionals and others who hold The Rocks in high regard for its historical, archaeological and architectural significance and research potential. The site contains potential archaeological remains which may provide information on the way of life and aspirations of the inhabitants over time. The site has the potential to reveal information about construction techniques associated with residential dwellings of the period and the subsurface archaeological remains may provide information about former dwellings and land use on the site. Bakers terrace is representative of a number of two storey terraces built for residential use in The Rocks, many of which have now disappeared.

Baker's Terrace was listed on the New South Wales State Heritage Register on 10 May 2002 having satisfied the following criteria.

The place is important in demonstrating the course, or pattern, of cultural or natural history in New South Wales.

Baker's Terrace and site are of State heritage significance for their historical and scientific cultural values. The site and building are also of State heritage significance for their contribution to The Rocks area which is of State Heritage significance in its own right. The site has been continually occupied since very early settlement and has strong associations with the early grants and subsequent developments on the site and The Rocks generally. This terrace is a good example of both the terrace style of residential development and the subdivision patterns that occurred in the mid Victorian period of Sydney particularly in The Rocks precinct. Baker added new fronts to the adjoining terraces to the north such that the four terraces became one unit in appearance. By 1887 they were known as Baker's Terrace. The terrace has remained essentially unaltered from 1887 and was tenanted as a residential unit until 1976/77 they were updated in the late 1980s. Bakers Terrace is important in demonstrating the development of The Rocks over time, and the continued pressure for greater density within the inner suburbs of Sydney. The swift decline of the building from its construction in the 1880s to slumlike conditions by the early 20th century demonstrates the rapid change in the fortunes of The Rocks and of its residents. Its subsequent restoration is an important part of the story of the conservation of The Rocks as a historic precinct and in the development of heritage conservation in Australia. The site's changing use reflects the urban, economic and social development of the area. It also reflects the working and lower middle class lifestyles of the early twentieth century and the two storey scale of the area which predominated in the pre bridge area. The rear of the buildings reflect the response to building on an uneven site. As a part of the substantial collection of 19th Century residential buildings in The Rocks, both Bakers Terraces as a whole, and its two original components at 66-68 and 70-72 Gloucester Street separately meet this criterion at a State level.

The place has a strong or special association with a person, or group of persons, of importance of cultural or natural history of New South Wales's history.

While the name of the builder, Edward Baker, is known, as well as names of many of the 19th and 20th century residents, none of them are associated with any events of particular historical note. The item does not meet this criterion.

The place is important in demonstrating aesthetic characteristics and/or a high degree of creative or technical achievement in New South Wales.

Bakers Terrace contributes strongly to the character of The Rocks, and it is an important part of the streetscape of Gloucester Street. The terraces show many of the typical features of the worker's terraces erected in Sydney in the middle Victorian period. They are well scaled buildings and good examples of their size and type. Baker added new fronts to the adjoining terraces to the north such that the four terraces became one unit in appearance. This action is indicative of one way of thinking, as it was apparently undertaken with the presumption that one larger building will present as being of greater status than two smaller, and to that degree which made the whole exercise perceived as feasible. By 1887 they were known as Baker's Terrace. The terrace has remained essentially unaltered from 1887 and was tenanted as a residential unit until 1976/77. Bakers Terrace as a whole meets this criterion at a State level.

The place has a strong or special association with a particular community or cultural group in New South Wales for social, cultural or spiritual reasons.

The site's changing use reflects the urban, economic and social development of the area. It also reflects the working and lower middle class lifestyles of the early twentieth century and the two storey scale of the area which predominated in the pre bridge area. The rear of the buildings reflect the response to building on an uneven site.

Bakers Terrace is held in high esteem as indicated by its listing on the registers of both the National Estate and National Trust, and thus is recognised by an identifiable group and has importance to the wider community. Bakers Terrace hold social significance for the local residents of The Rocks including Millers Point who have fought hard for the retention of the built fabric of The Rocks and for their right to continue living in the area. In addition, it has a special significance for those who campaigned vigorously with the residents against plans for the area's full scale redevelopment. It has special value to historians and heritage professionals and others who hold The Rocks in high regard for its historical, archaeological and architectural significance and research potential. Bakers Terrace as a whole meets this criterion at a State level.

The place has potential to yield information that will contribute to an understanding of the cultural or natural history of New South Wales.

The site contains potential archaeological remains which may provide information on the way of life and aspirations of the inhabitants over time. The site has the potential to reveal information about construction techniques associated with residential dwellings of the period and the subsurface archaeological remains may provide information about former dwellings and land use on the site.

The place possesses uncommon, rare or endangered aspects of the cultural or natural history of New South Wales.

While terrace housing is common across Sydney, Bakers Terrace is one of a relatively small number of surviving terrace-style houses within The Rocks area, as many were lost to clearance and the construction of the Sydney Harbour Bridge and the Cahill Expressway. It is also a rare surviving example of a façade deliberately created to incorporate two originally separate buildings. Bakers Terrace meets this criterion at a State level.

The place is important in demonstrating the principal characteristics of a class of cultural or natural places/environments in New South Wales.

The buildings at 66–68 & 70–72 Gloucester Street individually are typical of late Victorian terrace houses, with the unusual characteristic of incorporating parts of two earlier terrace houses into a single structure. Within The Rocks, each building separately and Bakers Terrace as a whole, are important in demonstrating the terrace style housing as a widespread and important change to the housing styles in mid 19th century inner Sydney, created in response to the increasing population density. Bakers Terrace meets this criterion at a local level.

== See also ==
- Australian residential architectural styles
- Susannah Place, 58–64 Gloucester Street
