= Robert Johnson (Australian politician) =

English-born Australian politician

Robert Ebenezer Johnson (1812 – 6 November 1866) was an English-born Australian politician.

He was born in London to Richard Johnson and Elizabeth Phillips. He migrated to Sydney around 1833 and worked as a solicitor's clerk, before being admitted as a solicitor in 1842. On 30 October 1834 he married Elizabeth Byrne, with whom he had five children. He was bankrupted in 1847 but discharged in 1848. He was a member of the New South Wales Legislative Council from 1856 to 1861 and from 1861 until his death in Double Bay in 1866; while serving he was known as a leader of the extreme conservatives.
