= Edward Wolstenholme Ward =

Australian politician

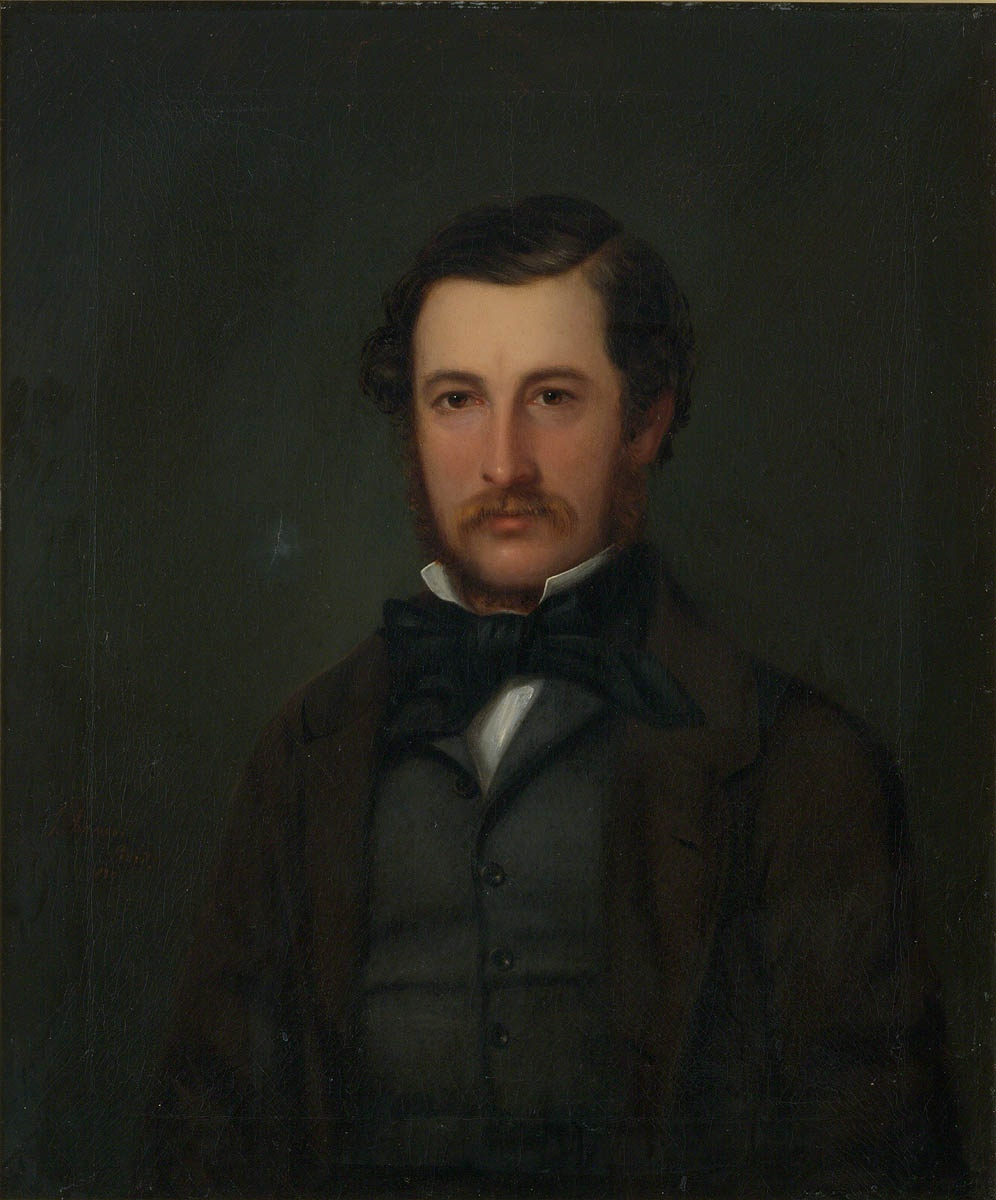
- Captain Edward Wolstenholme Ward, Sydney, 1859, by J. Anderson
- Born: Edward Wolstenholme Ward; 17 August 1823; Kolkata, India
- Died: 5 February 1890 (aged 66); Cannes, Queensland
- Education: Royal Military Academy, Woolwich
- Occupations: soldier; engineer; politician
- Known for: founder of the Fellowship of Australian Writers

Major-General Sir Edward Wolstenholme Ward KCMG (17 August 1823 – 5 February 1890) was an Indian-born British soldier and Australian politician as well as cricket player.

== Background ==
Born in Calcutta, he was the oldest son of John Petty Ward and his wife Eleanor Erskine, daughter of John Erskine. He was educated at Royal Military Academy, Woolwich and joined then the Royal Engineers as cadet in 1841.

== Career ==
Shortly after his admission, he got a promotion to second lieutenant and then in 1844 to first lieutenant. After additional studies at the Royal School of Mines, he began working for the Royal Mint and became second captain in 1852. Two years later, Ward was sent as deputy-master of its oversea branch to Sydney and was promoted to captain in 1855. In January 1855 he was appointed Chief Commissioner of New South Wales Railways, a new position, and was replaced by Captain Mann in July. In May of that year he was nominated a non-elective member of the New South Wales Legislative Council, sitting in it for nine months. He was appointed to the council for life in 1861, however resigned his seat in 1865. Ward was promoted to major in January 1864 and to lieutenant-colonel only few months later. When he returned to England in 1866, he was set on halfpay. He was replaced as deputy-master of the Mint by Charles Elouis, who held the position from 1868 to 1877.

In 1869, he became colonel and resumed his old post as deputy-master in a new branch in Melbourne. He was awarded a Commander of the Order of St Michael and St George in 1874 and retired with a pension three years later, having been promoted to major-general. In 1879, he was further honoured as a Knight Commander.

Ward played for the New South Wales cricket team in four of its early matches against Victoria between 1857 and 1862. He was one of the pioneers of roundarm bowling in Australia and was most effective, taking 27 wickets in his four matches at an average of 7.66. In the match against Victoria in 1858-59 he took 10 wickets for 57 runs. In 1857 the Australian Cricketer's Guide said of him: "Is an excellent and puzzling left-hand round-arm bowler, with medium pace, keeping the ball usually 'on the spot'."

He was a trustee of the Australian Museum and member of the Australian Philosophical Society. He was elected a member of the Photographic Society in March 1853 remaining a member until at least 1859.

== Family ==
On 21 November 1857, he married Anne Sophia Campbell, daughter of Robert Campbell, and had by her three sons and four daughters. Ward died in Cannes, aged 66.

== See also ==
- List of New South Wales representative cricketers
