= John MacFarlane (New South Wales politician) =

Scottish-born Australian physician and politician

John MacFarlane (31 July 1813 – 6 July 1873) was a Scottish-born Australian physician and politician.

He was born in Glasgow and studied medicine at Glasgow University, qualifying in 1837. MacFarlane was the first to describe desmoid tumours. He worked as a ship's doctor until 1840, when he settled in Sydney and opened a practice. In 1847 he married Agnes Grace Johnstone. He was honorary physician at Sydney Infirmary from 1847 to 1869 and an examiner for the University of Sydney in 1856; he was also awarded an honorary degree from the University of Melbourne. In 1860 he was president of the Australian Medical Association. He was a member of the New South Wales Legislative Council from 1858 to 1861 and from 1861 to 1870.

He died in Sydney on 6 July 1873 (aged 59), survived by his wife Agnes, two daughters and three sons.
