= John Blaxland (politician) =

Australian politician

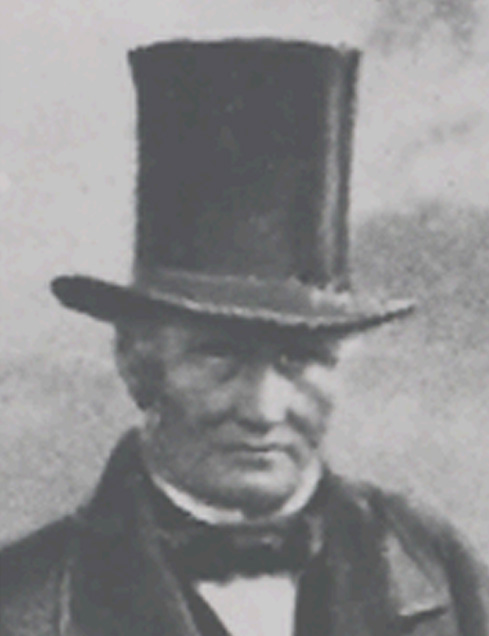
- Born: 26 September 1801; Kent, England
- Died: 26 January 1884 (aged 84–85); Denistone, NSW Australia
- Occupation(s): Merchant, Director of the Australian Joint Stock Bank, Auditor of the City Bank, Member of the NSW Legislative Council.
- Years active: MLC 25 Nov 1863 – 26 Jan 1884
- Spouse: Elaine Falkner
- Children: 9

John Blaxland (26 September 1801 (Note: The date of birth inscribed on John Blaxland's headstone at St Anne's, Ryde NSW gives his date of birth as 26 September 1801. The Parliament of NSW profile gives his birth year of 1799, stating "The exact date of birth is not known (1 January is put here for database reasons).") – 26 January 1884) was an English-born Australian businessman and politician.

He was born in Kent, England, to Gregory and Elizabeth Blaxland, and baptised at All Saints' Church, Purleigh, Essex. He came to New South Wales in 1805–6 with his family at the age of five. In New South Wales, his father became a merchant, businessman, and an explorer who would take a leading role in the first successful crossing of the Blue Mountains.

On 23 December 1845, John Blaxland married Ellen Falkner, with whom he had nine children. He was a merchant, and also became a Director of the Australian Joint Stock Bank and Auditor of the City Bank.

He was appointed to the New South Wales Legislative Council in 1863, and served there until his death at Ryde, New South Wales, in 1884.

He died at his home, The Hermitage, Denistone, and his remains are buried in St Anne's Churchyard, Ryde, New South Wales.

== See also ==
- Political families of Australia
