= James Chisholm (politician) =

Australian politician

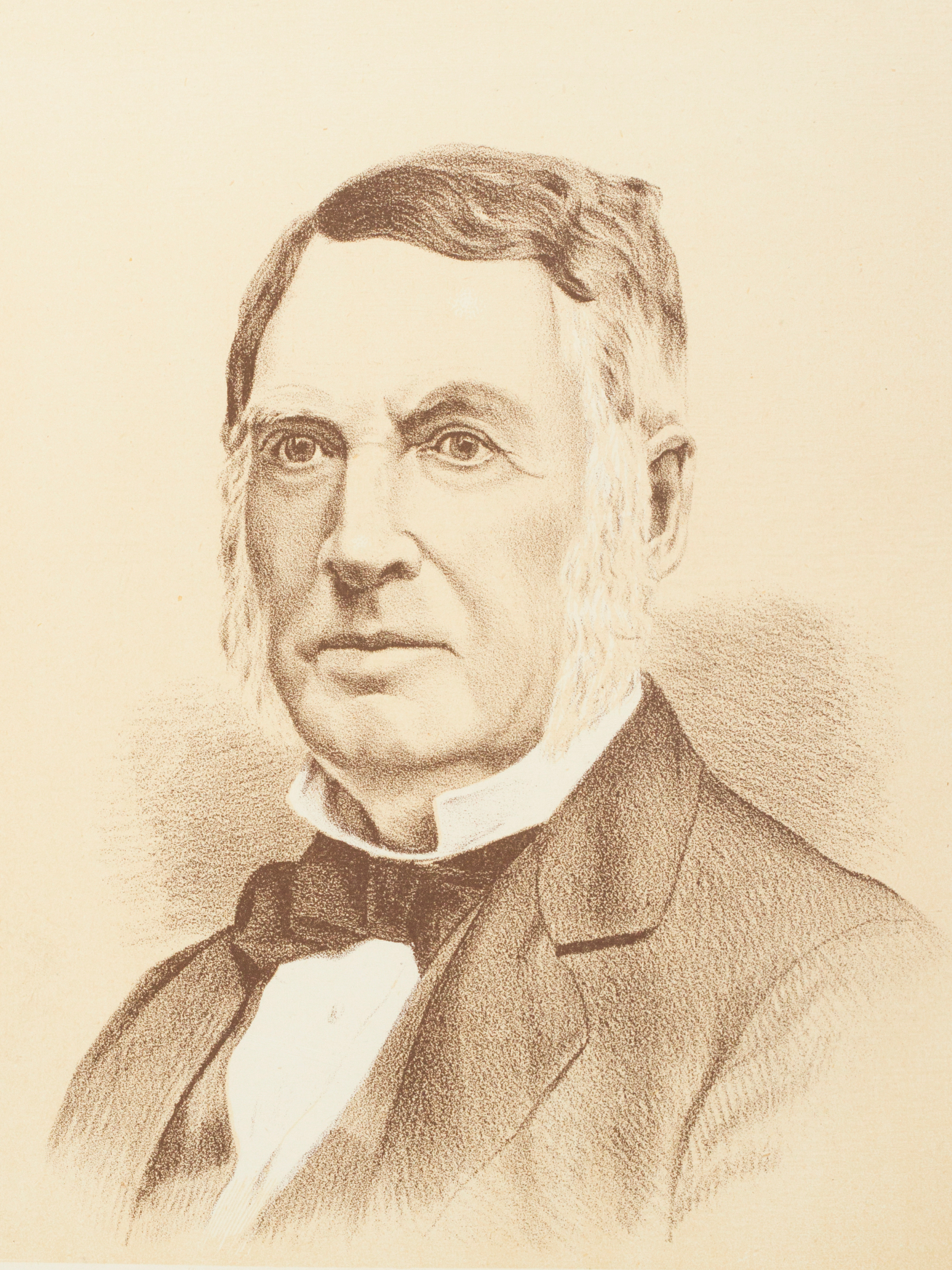
James Chisholm MLC

James Chisholm (5 November 1806 – 24 June 1888) was an Australian politician.

He was born in Sydney to James Chisholm, a member of the New South Wales Corps. At a young age he became a pastoralist near goulburn, taking up his head station, Kippilaw, about twelve kilometres due west of Goulburn, in 1826. On 9 June 1829 he married Elizabeth Margaret Kinghorne, with whom he had nine sons.

In January 1841, as a business venture, Chisholm supplied 5,000 sheep for overlanding from Goulburn to Adelaide, following the Murrumbidgee and Murray rivers. The overlanding party, under the joint command of Henry Inman and Henry Field, were attacked by Aboriginals at the Rufus River on 16 April 1841. All the livestock and equipment was lost, the overlanders narrowly escaping with their lives.

Chisholm was elected as a member of the New South Wales Legislative Council from 1851 to 1856 representing the Counties of King and Georgiana and was appointed to the council from 1865 to 1888, when he died at Goulburn.

New South Wales Legislative Council
Preceded by Terence Murray as member for Counties of Murray, King and Georgiana	Member for Counties of King and Georgiana; 1851 – 1856	Council abolished
