= Llanarth =

Llanarth may refer to:

- Llanarth, Ceredigion
- Llanarth, Monmouthshire
- Llanarth, Queensland
- Llanarth, New South Wales
- Llanarth (house), New South Wales
