= John Smith (New South Wales politician, born 1811) =

English-born Australian pastoralist and politician

John Smith (25 May 1811 – 1 January 1895) was an English-born Australian pastoralist and politician.

He was born at St Keverne in Cornwall to farmer John Smith and Elizabeth Cock. He emigrated to Sydney in 1836, and became a station superintendent at Molong. On 12 September 1842 he married Mary William Tom, with whom he had eleven children, of whom one, Fergus, would later serve in the New South Wales Parliament, and another, Emily Janet, married Sir Joseph Innes. He acquired land on the Lachlan River and Macquarie River, and also around Bathurst, including the now heritage listed property Llanarth.

He stood as a candidate for East Macquarie at the 1872 election, but was unsuccessful. He was again unsuccessful in contesting Molong at the November 1880 election.

In December 1880 he was appointed to the New South Wales Legislative Council, where he served until his death at Ashfield in 1895.
