= Number 470 Fire Bell =

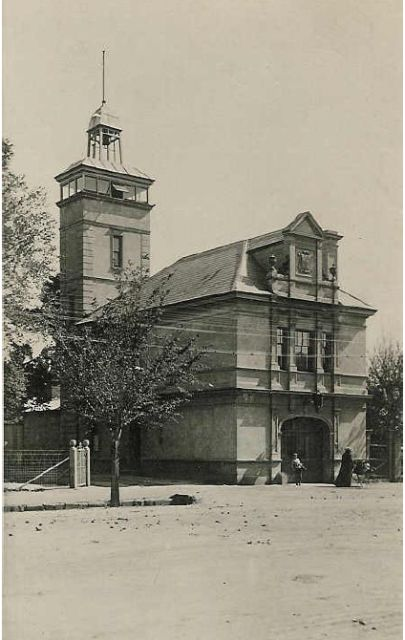
- Original 1887 Bathurst Fire Station, observation tower and bell. Circa 1891

- Original 1887 Bathurst Fire Station, observation tower and bell, circa 1891 Number 470 Fire Bell (Australia)
- 33.7477°S 150.6933°E
- Location: 56 Suttor Street, West Bathurst, Bathurst Region, New South Wales, Australia

History
- Built: 1855–1855

Site notes
- Architect: John C. Wilson

New South Wales Heritage Register
- Official name: Number 470 Fire Bell; Sydney Insurance Companies Fire Bell; Bathurst Fire Bell
- Type: state heritage (movable / collection)
- Designated: 11 July 2014
- Reference no.: 1928
- Type: Fire Control Objects (movable)
- Category: Utilities - Fire Control
- Builders: Gorbals Brass and Bell Foundry, Glasgow

Number 470 Fire Bell is a heritage-listed fire bell at 56 Suttor Street, West Bathurst, Bathurst Region, New South Wales, Australia. It was designed by John C. Wilson and built in 1855 by Gorbals Brass and Bell Foundry, Glasgow. It is also known as Sydney Insurance Companies Fire Bell and Bathurst Fire Bell. It was added to the New South Wales State Heritage Register on 11 July 2014.

== History ==
=== Aboriginal people and colonisation ===
Aboriginal occupation of the Blue Mountains area dates back at least 12,000 years and appears to have intensified some 3000–4000 years ago. In pre-colonial times the area now known as Bathurst was inhabited by Aboriginal people of the Wiradjuri linguistic group. The clan associated with Bathurst occupied on a seasonal basis most of the Macquarie River area. They moved regularly in small groups but preferred the open land and used the waterways for a variety of food. There are numerous river flats where debris from recurrent camps accumulated over a long period. European settlement in this region after the first documented white expedition west of the Blue Mountains in 1813 was tentative because of apprehensions about resistance from Aboriginal people. There was some contact, witnessed by sporadic hostility and by the quantity of surviving artefacts manufactured by the Aborigines from European glass. By 1840 there was widespread dislocation of Aboriginal culture, aggravated after 1850 by the goldrush to the region.

Prior to European settlement in Australia, the Wiradjuri Aboriginal group lived in the upper Macquarie Valley. Bathurst was proclaimed a town by Lachlan Macquarie on 7 May 1815, named after Lord Bathurst, Principal Secretary of State for the Colonies. Bathurst is Australia's oldest inland township. It was proclaimed a town in 1815 with the discovery of gold.

=== Bathurst ===
Governor Macquarie chose the site of the future town of Bathurst on 7 May 1815 during his tour over the Blue Mountains, on the road already completed by convict labour supervised by William Cox. Macquarie marked out the boundaries near the depot established by surveyor George Evans and reserved a site for a government house and domain. Reluctant to open the rich Bathurst Plains to a large settlement, Macquarie authorised few grants there initially, one of the first being 1000 acres to William Lawson, one of the three European explorers who crossed the mountains in 1813. The road-maker William Cox was another early grantee but later had to move his establishment to Kelso on the non-government side of the Macquarie River.

A modest release of land in February 1818 occurred when ten men were chosen to take up 50 acre farms and 2 acre town allotments across the river from the government buildings. When corruption by government supervisor Richard Lewis and acting Commandant William Cox caused their dismissal, they were replaced by Lieutenant William Lawson who became Commandant of the settlement in 1818.

Macquarie continued to restrict Bathurst settlement and reserved all land on the south side of the Macquarie River for government buildings and stock, a situation that prevailed until 1826. In December 1819 Bathurst had a population of only 120 people in 30 houses, two thirds being in the township of Kelso on the eastern side of the river and the remainder scattered on rural landholdings nearby. The official report in 1820 numbered Bathurst settlers at 114, including only 14 women and 15 children. The government buildings comprised a brick house for the commandant, brick barracks for the military detachment and houses for the stock keeper, and log houses for the 50 convicts who worked the government farm. Never successful, the government farm was closed by Governor Darling in 1828.

Governor Darling, arriving in Sydney in 1825, promptly commenced a review of colonial administration and subsequently introduced vigorous reforms. On advice from Viscount Goderich, Darling divided colonial expenditure into two parts: one to cover civil administration, funded by New South Wales; the other for the convict system, funded by Britain.

By this time, J. McBrien and Robert Hoddle had surveyed the existing grants in the vicinity. Surveyor James Bym Richards began work on the south side of the river in 1826. But the town was apparently designed by Thomas Mitchell in 1830 and did not open until late 1833 after Richards had completed the layout of the streets with their two-road allotments. The first sales were held in 1831 before the survey was complete.

In 1832 the new Governor, Major General Sir Richard Bourke, visited Bathurst in October. He instructed the Surveyor General Major Thomas L. Mitchell to make arrangements for "opening the town of Bathurst without delay" and he in turn instructed the Assistant Surveyor at Bathurst J.B. Richards to lay out the blocks and streets. This was done in September 1833. It is believed that Major Mitchell named the streets, with George Street being named after King George III.

=== Thomas & Charles Bown / the Insurance Companies Fire Brigade ===
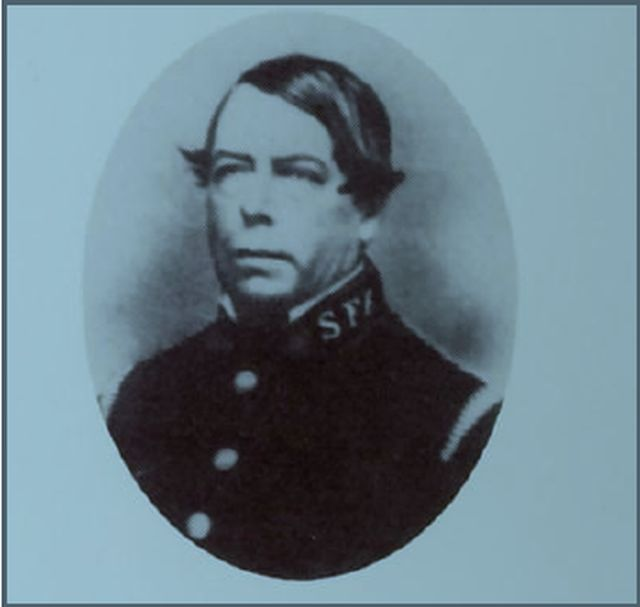
Thomas Bown who imported the Number 470 Bell from Glasgow and from whom the insurance companies purchased the bell

The name of Bown (spanning two generations) occupies a significant place in the history of firefighting in New South Wales and has a historical association with No. 470 Bell, as does the Insurance Companies Fire Brigade.

Thomas Bown arrived in Sydney from London, England, in June 1842. He was accompanied by Edward Harris. Both men were experienced professional firemen, and had been brought to the colony at the expense of the Mutual Fire Insurance Association (together with two fire engines) in order to form a fire brigade. Bown was appointed Principal Fireman and Superintendent of Water Works. Unfortunately, the brigade only lasted for thirteen months. The fire engines were consequently sold to the Sydney Corporation (ie City Council). Bown and Harris were then employed by the Corporation as firemen under the direction of the City Surveyor; however, Bown resigned just two months later in order to pursue his business interests, located in George Street.

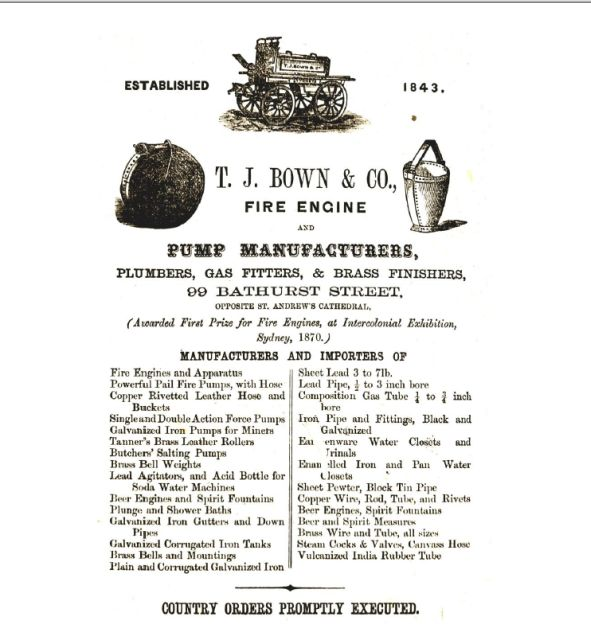
Advertisement for T.J. Bown who manufactured and imported bells and other firefighting equipment

By January 1851, the Sydney Corporation was reconsidering the justification and expense of maintaining a fire brigade, especially since it was coming under increased criticism concerning its capacity to provide adequate fire protection. This growing concern led a consortium of insurance companies to form its own fire brigade: the "Insurance Companies Fire Brigade" (also known as the Sydney Fire Establishment). Thomas Bown, was appointed Superintendent and the fire engine was housed at his premises in George Street, Brickfield Hill. Twice each month, this brigade of twelve volunteers (plus foreman Edward Harris) assembled for practice.

From 1854, the Insurance Companies Fire Brigade operated from a number of premises in George Street (all owned by Bown). In 1864, it occupied a three-storey, brick fire station, built at Bown's personal expense, at 105 Bathurst Street (opposite St Andrew's Cathedral). Tenders were called in September 1864, and the foundation stone was laid on 18 October 1864.

On the day that Bown retired as Superintendent of the Insurance Companies Fire Brigade (late 1867), it comprised twelve firemen; a foreman, an assistant foreman, a watchman, and three engineers. The brigade's working plant comprised a steam fire engine, three manual engines; a hose reel; and one hose and ladder carriage. Thomas Bown, died in January 1872 and was buried at St Peter's Cemetery, having (according to the Mayor of Sydney), "distinguished himself in the sphere of labour which he had marked out for himself - " the establishment and keeping in operation a fire brigade in Sydney'.

The retirement of Thomas Bown in 1867 did not conclude the family's association with the colony's fire protection. His nephew, Charles Bown, had arrived in the colony in 1857. Joining the Insurance Companies Fire Brigade, he was promoted to Foreman before succeeding his uncle as Superintendent in 1868, a position that he held until the passing of the Fire Brigades Act (1884). With the passing of the Act, the Metropolitan Fire Brigade (MFB) was instituted under the control of a newly-instituted Fire Brigade's Board. The Insurance Companies Brigade accordingly disbanded, with many of the firemen joining the new Metropolitan Fire Brigade. The MFB then occupied the Bathurst Street fire station (leased to the Fire Brigades Board by Charles Bown, who had by that stage taken over the management of his uncle's business). Charles was elected to the Fire Brigades Board as its first Chairman: an office that he held until the institution of the state-wide, Board of Fire Commissioners of NSW, in 1910. He then became that board's first President.

=== Number 470 Bell ===
Fire bells played an important role in nineteenth century firefighting - they not only called a brigade into action, but also directed neighbouring brigades to the fireground location. In 1857, Sydney was protected by the Insurance Companies Fire Brigade (located at George Street, Brickfields Hill) and two volunteer fire companies: No. 1 Company at Haymarket; and No. 2 Company in Phillip Street (near the current Justice and Police Museum).

The following excerpt is taken from an article written in June that year, which describes the completion of No. 1 Volunteer Company's new fire station in Pitt Street, Haymarket. It is significant in that it provides an insight into the deficiencies of Sydney's fire alarm system, and suggests a solution:

'...The portion now finished includes ... the belfry, in which is placed an alarm bell ... With respect to the alarm bells of the two Volunteer companies, and the Fire Insurance Offices' brigade, it has been found that they are by no means adequate to give notice of the fire simultaneously, and that an alarm being sounded by the No. 1 Company's watchman in Pitt-street South, or by Mr Bown, on Brickfield-hill, cannot be heard by the No. 2 Company's watchman at their engine-house in the neighbourhood of the semi-Circular Quay; and vice versa.
This defect in the arrangements has been lately brought under the notice of the Mayor and the Court of Aldermen, by Mr Torning, in the form of a memorial from the members of both Volunteer Companies, and the Insurance Brigade. The memorialists set forth the serious inconvenience and delays which arise from the want of a general alarm bell in the centrical (sic) part of the city, and they suggest that a fire bell of great capacity of sound should be hung on the top of the George-street Police Office, and watchmen ... stationed night and day; and who, by certain strokes of the bell, shall indicate the ward in which a fire may be discovered, and the firemen be thus enabled to direct their engines, simultaneously, to the scene of danger. They inform the Court, that Mr Bown has for sale the largest bell in Sydney, whose tones can be distinctly heard in every part of the city ... '.

This reference, in June 1857, to Thomas Bown possessing "a large bell" is the earliest indication that Number 470 Bell had arrived in Sydney. Number 470 Bell was manufactured by Glasgow bellfounder: John C. Wilson, on 20 January 1855. Wilson's company, "Gorbals Brass and Bell Foundry", supplied numerous bells to the colonies (including Sydney and Melbourne). The Company's register of bells describes bell number 470 as a rough finished (ie unpolished), 26 inches (66 cm), Turret Bell of 350 lb 12 oz (159.1 kg). It also records that the bell was sold to Thomas Bown through an agent (Mr Alexander) who sold numerous bells to the Australian colonies.

The lack of a substantial fire alarm system gave rise to various suggestions for rectifying the situation, with the system used in San Francisco being a dominating topic of discussion:

'... On the roof of the City Hall, which is erected on an elevated point in the centre of San Francisco, ... are constantly stationed watchmen; the belfry having a loud sounding alarm bell. The instant a fire is perceived, a certain number of strokes announces in which of the twelve districts or wards into which the city is divided the fire has been discovered, and thus, ere the fire has time to acquire strength, several engines are on the spot, and the united hoses give them a command of water from various cisterns ...'.

The following month, the matter of a fire bell was discussed by Council, at which time a motion to purchase four bells (to be placed throughout the city) was rejected. It was eventually resolved to vote twenty pounds toward the cost of erecting a fire alarm bell at the Central Police Court (as suggested in the abovementioned petition from the three brigades).

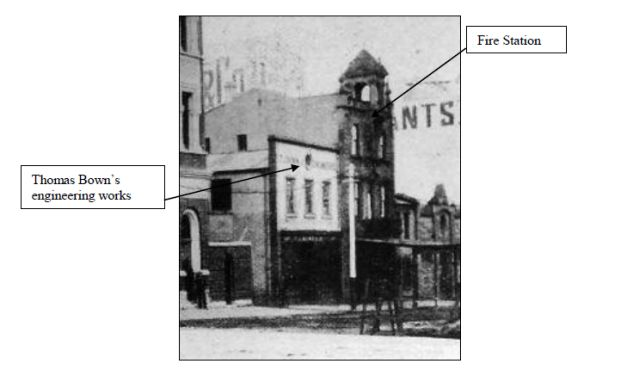
Insurance Companies Fire Brigade Station, Bathurst St Sydney in 1901. The Bell Tower is empty as the bell is in Bathurst by this time.

The Council's resolution, however, does not appear to have been acted upon and Mr Bown's "large bell" disappears from the records until June 1860, when the Insurance Companies Fire Brigade christened its - "new fire bell". The cost of this bell had been borne by the various insurance companies rather than by Council, and various representations were made concerning its possible location. It appears, however, that Thomas Bown (who had been instrumental in both the purchase and the erection of the bell) had the final say concerning where it would be erected:

'A new fire bell of large dimensions, swung on a wooden framework tower at the back of the Fire Insurance Brigade's enginehouse, was christened and rung for the first time on Wednesday evening. The bell weighs about four cwt., being four times larger than any fire bell in Sydney. The elevation of this bell to a suitable place has been in contemplation for more than a twelve-month (sic). Application was in the first instance made by Mr Dyer to the Corporation for leave to place it in the tower at the north end of the New Market, but some objection was made, and the application was consequently refused. The tower of the Police Office was next suggested, but this suggestion was not carried into effect. Ultimately, Mr Bown (not being allowed to place the bell in the front of the new building now occupied by the insurance engines in George-street, near Bathurst-street) erected a wooden tower at the back, and hung the bell there at an elevation of thirty three feet above the ground ...'.

Like the bell in San Francisco, Sydney's new bell was intended to be a city-wide signal bell for all three brigades:

'... The bell can be rung by means of the apparatus by which it is swung, or by means of a rope attached to the clapper. In this way a difference of tone is expected to be obtained, which Mr Bown intends to make available for indicating the position of a fire, for the benefit of the other fire brigades, should the tone not prove sufficiently distinct by the method of ringing the bell, then it is proposed to indicate the position of the fire by striking the bell a certain number of times per minute, according to a preconcerted (sic) arrangement. Attached to the tower, and rising far above it, is a pole, on which a red light will be exhibited as soon as a fire has been discovered, and which light will continue to be exhibited till the fire is extinguished. The expenses consequent on the purchase of the bell, and the placing it in the present position, is to be borne by the united Fire Insurance Companies. The bell was christened on Wednesday evening by Mr Dyer, of the Sydney Insurance Company ...'.

The relationship between the Insurance Brigade and the volunteer companies was not always harmonious; in fact, it could be very competitive. Indeed, in 1861, No. 470 fire bell became a matter of contention, with one correspondent complaining to the editor of the Sydney Morning Herald:

'This evening, at five minutes past seven, the fire bell in George-street sounded the alarm, and at the same instant I perceived the Insurance Company's engine ... having already departed. The fact is, and this is not the first time I have observed it, they get the fire engine ready, and when it has fairly started they sound the alarm for the volunteer companies to follow them ... Surely the public will see the vital necessity of having their own fire bell somewhere, say, for example, in the yard of the Central Police Court'.

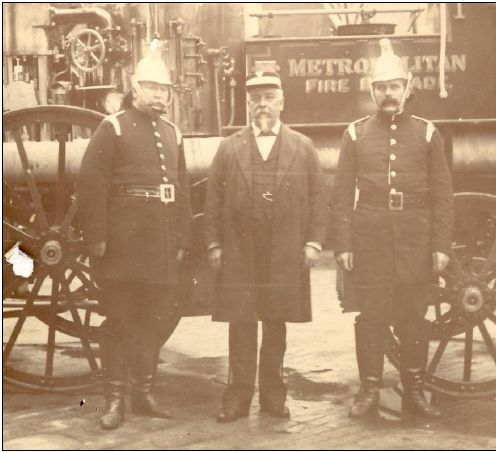
Charles Bown (centre) with Superintendent Alfred Webb and Deputy Superintendent Nicholas Sparkes in 1887

During the late 1860s, relations between the volunteer companies and the Insurance Brigade deteriorated. The supporters of the Insurance Brigade spoke of the volunteers as disorganised rabble, whilst the volunteers accused the Insurance Companies of being motivated solely by profit. By late 1864 or early 1865, the bell was located at the new fire station in Bathurst Street, which had been erected and leased to the Insurance Companies Brigade by Thomas Bown (see above). The fire station featured an impressive bell tower. When describing the laying of the foundation stone, the Sydney Morning Herald reported:

'... There will be a handsome bell turret from the roof twelve feet six inches high, giving a total height of forty feet. The turret will open on all sides, and from its elevation will afford a good view over the city'.

Technological advances, however, determined that the bell's continued service in Sydney would be limited to a further thirteen years. In 1881, Sydney's first telephone exchange was established at the Royal Exchange. The following year, the Post Master General also established an exchange, to which the Insurance Companies Fire Brigade was connected. From this time, the large fire bell and messengers on foot were increasingly replaced by the telephone, as a means of reporting fires.

In 1884, the Metropolitan Fire Brigade replaced the Insurance Companies Fire Brigade, leasing the Bathurst Street fire station from Charles Bown. From that time on, there was no longer any need for a large bell to summon firemen. The firemen of the Metropolitan Fire Brigade were "full-time" firemen. They lived at the fire station; and they were on duty twenty-four hours a day - seven days out of eight! Moreover, the bell was no longer needed as a signalling device to direct the neighbouring volunteer companies to a fire, for telephonic communication had been established between them and the MFB. Thus, by 1887, Number 470 Bell had outlived its usefulness in Sydney, and so Charles Bown (now the Chairman of the new Fire Brigades Board) sold the bell to the Bathurst Fire Brigade Board (probably in time for the official opening of the new Bathurst Fire Station, in June that year).

=== Relocating to Bathurst (1887) ===
Following several unsuccessful attempts to form a fire brigade in Bathurst (dating back to 1875) a Bathurst Fire Brigade Board was formed in January 1886. With Bathurst not being covered by the Fire Brigades Act (1884), this was one of the three ways that country towns could establish a volunteer fire brigade: 1) formation by a group of citizens; 2) formation by the Town Council; and, as in the case of Bathurst; 3) formation through the establishment of a local Fire Brigade Board.

The new Bathurst Fire Brigade Board immediately set about its task, ordering a fire engine from England and instructing an architect to prepare plans for a substantial fire station. Tenders were called and, in September 1886, the Board accepted that of Dunkley & Bartlett. The two-storey fire station (in Williams Street) was completed in early 1887, and "officially opened" on Saturday 25 June 1887. James Butcher, the first captain, recalled in 1910 that the observation/bell tower was not part of the original plans: "The contract price [of the fire station] was £1100, but subsequently a tower was erected at a cost of about £165". Eighteen years later, Station Officer George Butcher wrote that, once the brigade had been formed:

'... a large call bell was purchased from Messrs. C.J. Bown & Co., this bell had seen service in Sydney for some years with the Insurance Fire Brigade under their Superintendent Mr Charles Bown, and is still at Bathurst'.

In being positioned in the new tower, Number 470 bell commenced a new stage in its career; however, it wasn't always considered to provide satisfactory service. The bell first called Bathurst Brigade to action, on 17 August 1887, to a fire at the Peers' Newmarket Hotel in William Street; however, it appears that the "belfry" badly affected the performance of the bell. Two months later it was observed that:

'Great complaints have frequently been made about the position of the fire bell ... The belfry is altogether too low, and last night, it could not be heard at any great distance even by those about in the streets, while those asleep in houses close to the Station and to the scene of the fire were not aroused'.

The Bathurst Board consequently announced its intention to have the tower raised by approximately forty feet (12 m) in the hope that, in future, Captain Butcher would not be "put to the inconvenience of sending his own children as messengers to arouse the Brigade". Tenders were called on 6 December 1887, and the work was finished by March 1891. The alterations were generally thought to be a success:

'Very recently the tower attached to the Fire Brigade Station has been altered and the position of the bell changed ... From reports we learn that the alarm last night was heard in the most remote portions of the city'.

Unfortunately, it appears that, over the ensuing nineteen years past mistakes were forgotten, and were destined to be repeated. In 1916, Number 470 Bell once again came under criticism for its performance, and narrowly escaped being melted down and sold. Bathurst Volunteer Fire Brigade had come under the control of the newly-instituted Board of Fire Commissioners of NSW in 1910. Unlike its predecessor, this Board had state-wide jurisdiction over fire protection. Accordingly, the Bathurst Fire Brigade Board was dissolved, and all property belonging to that Board was vested in the Board of Fire Commissioners. By 1916, the bell had become "too heavy to work on account of the long pulling ropes, and their leads". It was therefore recommended that the bell be lowered from the tower to the yard. The new Board apparently had no knowledge of the earlier acoustics problems experienced in earlier times, for the recommendation was adopted. The Board Secretary noted in 1916: "the fire bell, which weighs it is understood in the neighbourhood of 4 cwt., is hung on uprights a few feet from the ground".

Unfortunately, once again the bell's performance was adversely affected; and once again it came under criticism. Bathurst's officer in charge complained that the bell could not be heard, and concluded that it was "not a good ringing bell". It was suggested that the bell might be replaced by a "stock bell" and the cost recouped by melting down the old bell and selling the metal to a dealer. The Board of Fire Commissioners sought a report from the Resident Country Inspector, who noted:

'In reference to the bell, I might state that, as the Station was surrounded by large trees in the park, also that it was under a big pine tree in the Station yard, the bell did not seem to have any sound in it. During the last few weeks the trees ... have been cut down and I have also cut some branches off the tree in the yard. I rang the bell during last week and it seemed to have an improvement in it ...'.

The Board decided that, since the bell was the same one formerly used by the Insurance Companies Fire Brigade in Sydney, which was recognised as a splendid ringing bell, it would allow the matter to stand until renovations to the station were completed. By October 1917, the bell was once again hanging on what was then referred to as the "hose tower" and its performance was reported to be most satisfactory (it appears that by 1917, the observation tower was also being utilised as a hose drying tower). Photographic evidence reveals that, in 1963, when the bell was removed prior to the demolition of the Williams Street station, it was being removed from its original (1887) position: above the observation tower.

=== Recovery and Restoration (2007-2010) ===
On 29 June 1962, the Bathurst Shire Clerk wrote to the Board of Fire Commissioners with a request concerning the bell:

'Now that steps have been taken towards the building of a new Fire Station at Bathurst, it is requested that as soon as possible, your Board call for tenders for the demolition of the existing Fire Station In connection with the demolition, it would be appreciated if the old fire bell could be made available to the Council for exhibition in its Historical Exhibition'.

The Board's minutes record that the Board granted the council's request "subject to the usual conditions". The minutes do not elaborate on those conditions; however, a letter subsequently forwarded to the Town Clerk states:

'... the Board has approved the old fire bell being handed over to your council for display in its Historical Exhibition on a permanent loan basis'.

In June 1963, with the demolition of the Williams Street fire station imminent, Number 470 Bell was removed from the belltower. Records indicate that, three weeks after Council's request to have the bell made available for its historical exhibition, Bathurst District Historical Society made a similar request to the Board. The Board Secretary informed the Society that it had already given approval to the council's request and suggested that the Society contact Council. It appears that the bell was subsequently handed over to the Society by Bathurst Council soon after its removal from the old station. Mr Doug Humphreys (son of former resident volunteer fireman, Kevin Humphreys), resided in both the Williams Street and George Street Fire Stations as a child. He recalls the bell being in the possession of the Bathurst Historical Society at No. 1 George Street:

'At that time the Society occupied premises at 1 George Street, Bathurst. I can remember as a child visiting the museum and ringing the bell. It was in the back yard of number 1 George Street on a low mounting'.

Mr Humphreys’ recollections concerning the bell's location during the mid-1960s are congruent with a comment made by the Western Advocate at the time of the bell's restoration to the current Bathurst Fire Station, in 2010. This newspaper stated that Bathurst Historical Society had "salvaged the original No. 470 bell, which had been found hidden under a wisterias (sic) bush at No. 1 George Street" (WA 8/11/2010 online). This is also consistent with a statement contained in a subsequent loan agreement (between the Bathurst Historical Society and Fire & Rescue NSW), which indicates that the bell had been on display in the grounds of the Old Government Cottage since 1965, and that it had been mounted on a steel frame. (The grounds of Old Government Cottage are in Stanley Street, at the rear of No. 1 George Street).

The bell has now been re-located to the premises of the current fire station, and has been re-hung in the restored upper section of the observation/bell tower, which comprised part of the original Williams Street fire station (1887) and had been used as an orchid "hot-house" by both Bathurst Council, and private residents, over the years. On 5 November 2010, the bell and tower were officially reopened by Fire Commissioner Greg Mullins, who later reported: 'I attended the official reopening of the restored bell tower at Bathurst Fire Station on 5 November. The observation and bell tower formed part of the original Bathurst Fire Station on Williams Street that was opened in 1887. The restoration project was undertaken by Bathurst retained firefighters, with extensive support from the Bathurst Regional Council and local community. The tower was restored over a period of three years, with local TAFE students spending around 2000 hours on the project, and local businesses donating a range of materials, including paints and timber. The restored observation and bell tower is now located at the current Bathurst Fire Station as a reminder of the long and proud history of the NSWFB to the community ...' (CC 2010 online).

Thus, Number 470 Bell has been restored to a firefighting context. Its association with the firefighting community of NSW has been re-established. It is an association that commenced in 1857, with Superintendent Thomas Bown, in Sydney.

== Description ==
The Number 470 Fire Bell is an unpolished, 26 inches (66 cm) Turret Bell of 350 pounds 12 ounces (159.1 kg). It bears the inscription; "John C. Wilson, Glasgow; 1855". The bell is installed in the remnant original Bathurst fire bell tower. The bell and tower were restored in 2010 by the Bathurst Fire Brigade volunteers.

During the restoration of the bell to the Bathurst Fire Station in 2007-2010 the bell was painted black and the manufacturers inscription was painted white. Having been manufactured by Gorbals Brass and Bell Foundry it is likely to be cast in brass, the paint would need to be scraped off to confirm this.

The integrity of the bell is high.

== Heritage listing ==
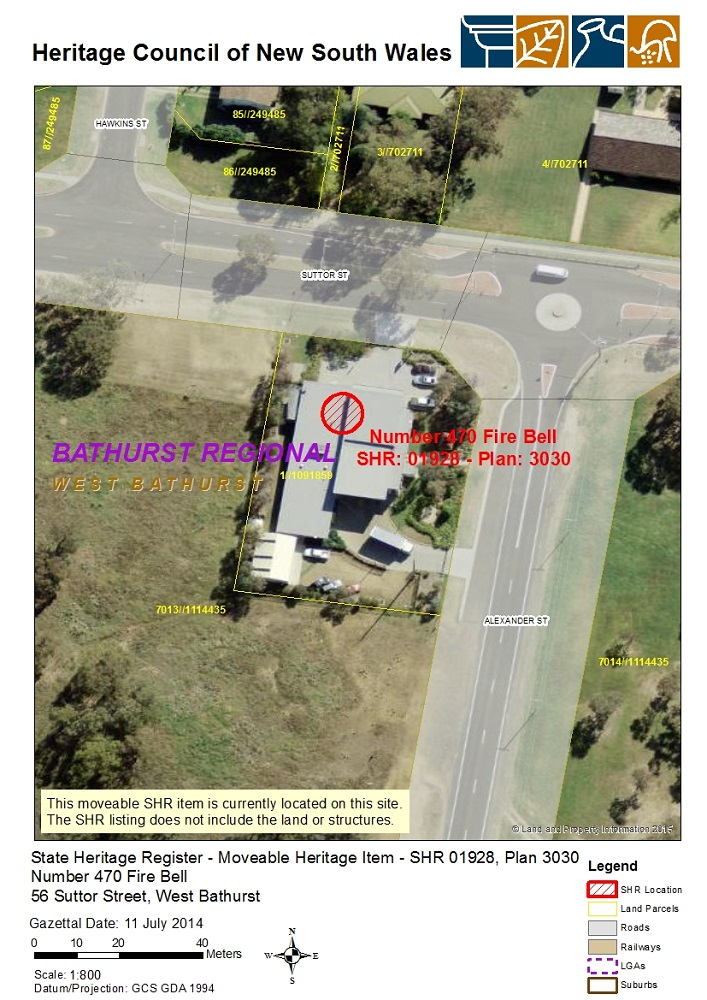
Heritage boundaries

Number 470 Fire Bell, installed in remnants of the original Bathurst bell tower, is of State heritage significance for its historic values, as the first large bell used to establish a centralised fire alert system in Sydney and NSW. It was made in 1855 at Gorbels Foundry in Glasgow.

The bell is one of the very few fire alarm bells from the period predating statutory fire control in NSW, the history of its use provides a clear insight into methods of fire alarming prior to statutory control and modern telecommunication systems making it of State heritage significance.

Its heritage significance at a state level is enhanced through its association with an historically significant figure in the development of the fire service in NSW, Thomas Bown, founding figure in the evolution of fire fighting services in NSW. It is also significant for its association with the Insurance Companies Fire Brigades prior to statutory fire control in NSW and for its long standing association with the NSW Fire Service from its inception in 1884 to the present day.

It has rarity values as likely the largest and oldest, UK manufactured bell, four times the size of normal fire bells at the time, remaining in the Fire and Rescue NSW collection, and also in the context of its long working life at Bathurst Fire Station.

Number 470 Fire Bell was listed on the New South Wales State Heritage Register on 11 July 2014 having satisfied the following criteria.

The place is important in demonstrating the course, or pattern, of cultural or natural history in New South Wales.

Number 470 Bell is historically significant as the first large fire bell used to establish a centralised fire alert system in NSW. Its history of use by the Insurance Companies Fire Brigade then by the Metropolitan Fire Brigade and later the Bathurst Volunteer Fire Brigade Station reflects the development of fire alarming technologies from the period prior to statutory fire control in NSW. The Number 470 Fire Bell effectively demonstrates the culmination of the first phase of development of the state's fire fighting technology in NSW.

The place has a strong or special association with a person, or group of persons, of importance of cultural or natural history of New South Wales's history.

Number 470 Bell is of state significance for its association with an historically significant figure in the development of the fire service in NSW. Thomas Bown, who imported and sold the bell to the Insurance Companies Fire Brigade, was one of the first professional firemen in NSW. He established and headed the Insurance Companies Fire Brigade from 1851 to 1867. It is also significant for its association with the Insurance Companies Fire Brigades prior to statutory fire control in NSW and for its long standing association with the NSW Fire Service from its inception in 1884 to the present day.

The place possesses uncommon, rare or endangered aspects of the cultural or natural history of New South Wales.

The Number 470 Fire Bell is of State heritage significance as likely the only large, UK manufactured bell, four times the size of normal fire bells at the time, remaining in the Fire and Rescue collection (documented in its Heritage and Conservation Register). A small number of Fire Stations retain bells but these are smaller, common cast bells made in Australia dating from a later period. It is also rare at the local level for the length of its working life at Bathurst Fire Station.
