= Llanarth (house) =

Heritage listed house in New South Wales, Australia

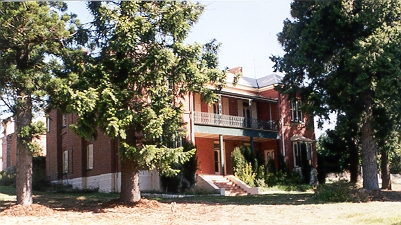

- Location within New South Wales Location within Australia
- 33.3954°S 149.5558°E
- Location: 120 Eglinton Road, Llanarth, Bathurst Region, New South Wales, Australia

History
- Built: 1858–1864

Site notes
- Architect: 1907 Stables: Architect JJ Copeman

New South Wales Heritage Register
- Official name: Llanarth; Strathden; Stratheden
- Type: state heritage (built)
- Designated: 2 April 1999
- Reference no.: 296
- Type: Semi-Detached House
- Category: Residential buildings (private)
- Builders: Mr W Atkins (1858); John Smith (1864)

Llanarth is a heritage-listed residence at 120 Eglinton Road, Llanarth, Bathurst Region, New South Wales, Australia. It was built from 1858 to 1864, the original house by W. Atkins and the 1864 alterations by John Smith. The 1907 stables were designed by J. J. Copeman. It is also known as Strathden and Stratheden. It was added to the New South Wales State Heritage Register on 2 April 1999.

== History ==
=== Aboriginal people and colonisation ===
Aboriginal occupation of the Blue Mountains area dates back at least 12,000 years and appears to have intensified some 3000–4000 years ago. In pre-colonial times the area now known as Bathurst was inhabited by Aboriginal people of the Wiradjuri linguistic group. The clan associated with Bathurst occupied on a seasonal basis most of the Macquarie River area. They moved regularly in small groups but preferred the open land and used the waterways for a variety of food. There are numerous river flats where debris from recurrent camps accumulated over a long period. European settlement in this region after the first documented white expedition west of the Blue Mountains in 1813 was tentative because of apprehensions about resistance from Aboriginal people. There was some contact, witnessed by sporadic hostility and by the quantity of surviving artefacts manufactured by the Aborigines from European glass. By 1840 there was widespread dislocation of Aboriginal culture, aggravated after 1850 by the goldrush to the region.

Prior to European settlement in Australia, the Wiradjuri Aboriginal group lived in the upper Macquarie Valley. Bathurst was proclaimed a town by Lachlan Macquarie on 7 May 1815, named after Lord Bathurst, Principal Secretary of State for the Colonies. Bathurst is Australia's oldest inland township. It was proclaimed a town in 1815 with the discovery of gold.

=== Bathurst ===
Governor Macquarie chose the site of the future town of Bathurst on 7 May 1815 during his tour over the Blue Mountains, on the road already completed by convict labour supervised by William Cox. Macquarie marked out the boundaries near the depot established by surveyor George Evans and reserved a site for a government house and domain. Reluctant to open the rich Bathurst Plains to a large settlement, Macquarie authorised few grants there initially, one of the first being 1000 acres to William Lawson, one of the three European explorers who crossed the mountains in 1813. The road-maker William Cox was another early grantee but later had to move his establishment to Kelso on the non-government side of the Macquarie River.

A modest release of land in February 1818 occurred when ten men were chosen to take up 50 acre farms and 2 acre town allotments across the river from the government buildings. When corruption by government supervisor Richard Lewis and acting Commandant William Cox caused their dismissal, they were replaced by Lieutenant William Lawson who became Commandant of the settlement in 1818.

Macquarie continued to restrict Bathurst settlement and reserved all land on the south side of the Macquarie River for government buildings and stock, a situation that prevailed until 1826. In December 1819 Bathurst had a population of only 120 people in 30 houses, two thirds being in the township of Kelso on the eastern side of the river and the remainder scattered on rural landholdings nearby. The official report in 1820 numbered Bathurst settlers at 114, including only 14 women and 15 children. The government buildings comprised a brick house for the commandant, brick barracks for the military detachment and houses for the stock keeper, and log houses for the 50 convicts who worked the government farm. Never successful, the government farm was closed by Governor Darling in 1828.

Governor Darling, arriving in Sydney in 1825, promptly commenced a review of colonial administration and subsequently introduced vigorous reforms. On advice from Viscount Goderich, Darling divided colonial expenditure into two parts: one to cover civil administration, funded by New South Wales; the other for the convict system, funded by Britain.

By this time, J. McBrien and Robert Hoddle had surveyed the existing grants in the vicinity. Surveyor James Bym Richards began work on the south side of the river in 1826. But the town was apparently designed by Thomas Mitchell in 1830 and did not open until late 1833 after Richards had completed the layout of the streets with their two-road allotments. The first sales were held in 1831 before the survey was complete.

In 1832 the new Governor, Major General Sir Richard Bourke, visited Bathurst in October. He instructed the Surveyor General Major Thomas L. Mitchell to make arrangements for "opening the town of Bathurst without delay" and he in turn instructed the Assistant Surveyor at Bathurst J.B. Richards to lay out the blocks and streets. This was done in September 1833. It is believed that Major Mitchell named the streets, with George Street being named after King George III.

=== Llanarth ===
In 1830 Thomas Jarman Hawkins received a land grant for 320 acres in Bathurst, which he called Walmer. Hawkins was born in 1809 and died in 1885. Hawkins was a Coroner and Returning Officer for Bathurst, Commissioner of Crown Lands for the Western District and Gold Commissioner. He was also a prominent churchman and was one of the earliest pioneer pastoralists of western New South Wales. In November 1853 320 acres of the original land grant to Hawkins was transferred to James H. Stewart and his wife Leticia Stewart. N. Stewart sold the land to William Atkins in August 1857.

Atkins proceeded to build the house, coach-house and stables in 1858. He named the property 'Stratheden'. Originally the house was built on Ophir Road, which has now been renamed Eglinton Road. The house was surrounded by a large garden and had a long driveway. The coach-house was originally built as servant's quarters. The house is said to be built by convict labour using hand made bricks and Australian red cedar.

In September 1858 the deed of the property was transferred from William Atkins to Sophia Hannah Atkins, his wife and his sons, Thomas and James, but it was transferred back to William Atkins in March 1862. William Atkins appears to have sold part of the property to Charles Macphillamy in April 1862.

The road north of Llanarth was part of the original road to the goldfields and was known as Mason's Lane. The first wine grapes were planted in this area by Rankin and Hawkins on the land between Llanarth and Excelsior. A hawthorn (Crataegus oxycantha) hedge on the Ophir Road was part of the windbreak. The road on the north side of Llanarth was part of the original road to the goldfields at Hill End. It was known as Mason's Lane. The area behind "Llanarth" (to the south) was known as Hawkin's Bush Park, and was a favourite picnic and social gathering area for many years.

John Smith of Molong purchased the subject site in April 1863 from Charles Macphillamy and William Atkins. John Smith purchased numerous parcels of land in Molong between 1856 and 1865, and the Golden Fleece Inn in West Molong in the 1860s. He was said to have spent less time at his property in Molong known as "Gamboola" and more at Llanarth by 1864.

The Hastings family lived the house for a brief period of time in 1863, but do not appear to have been the owners, during which the rear section of the house was burnt down. The house was not rebuilt at this time. During ownership by the Smith family, the coachman's cottage is said to have been built in front of the entrance gates to Llanarth (BDHS nd). Mr Tyne lived in the cottage with his family. In c. 1864 there were several small buildings adjacent to Llanarth but the one most prominent was a cottage in front at the entrance gates, known as 'the coachman's cottage'. Mr Tyne and his family lived in the coachman's cottage for quite some time.

John Smith rebuilt the rear section of the house and renamed it "Llanarth". Smith was born in 1811 in Trelanvean, Cornwall, England and came to Sydney in 1836 in the Abel Gower. His main occupation was a sheep breeder, and in 1880 he joined the Legislative Council with his knowledge of financial and pastoral matters. He was the President of the Pastoral and Agricultural Association in Molong before he moved to Llanarth. John Smith married Mary Tom, daughter of William Tom, in September 1842 and they had five sons and six daughters.

John Smith's eldest son, Fergus Jago Smith, was educated at the King's School in Sydney, was initially interested in pastoral pursuits. He went on to represent West Macquarie in the Legislative Assembly between 1887 and 1889 and he sat in the Legislative Council between 1895 and 1924, and he travelled extensively, spending much of his time in Egypt. Mrs Emily Smith (née Machattie) was almost as well known in Bathurst as her husband due to her "philanthropic and war-time work". Shortly after their marriage the couple lived at "Toogong" on the Forbes Road, about 30 miles from Orange, but Jago Smith died in 1925 in his home "Hawthorne" in Bathurst. Hawthorne villa was recommended in Bathurst Regional Heritage Study 2007 for inclusion in the Wattle Flat Village Conservation Area.

The name "Llanarth" is said to have Cornish origins (BDHS nd). Both John and Mary Smith had Cornish ancestry, as Mary's father, William Tom, was born in 1791 on a farm at Blisland, Cornwall, England and came to Sydney on the Betty Ann and Jupiter in 1823 at which time Mary was four years old. Mary Smith (née Tom) was one of thirteen children of William and Ann Tom.

In 1907 Fergus Jago Smith called for tenders for the erection of brick stables on the property. The architect for the stables was JJ Copeman, and these stables may have replaced earlier stables built by Atkins in 1860. The Trent Pavilion at the Bathurst Showgrounds was also designed by Copeman in 1897 (Heritage Office, 2008C).

The Smith family lived in the house for nearly 50 years. When John Smith died in 1895 in Ashfield he left "Llanarth" to his wife during her lifetime, with the proceeds to be distributed to their children on her death. Mary Smith was strongly involved in community affairs, such as raising funds for a hall along with other local ladies from a bazaar in December 1874. Mary died in 1912 in Bathurst.

In August 1912 the following list of rooms at Llanarth was taken from four pages of inventory of furniture and fittings:

- Verandah room
- Sitting room
- Mrs Smith's room
- Hall
- Back passage
- Miss Savage's room
- Dining room
- Work room
- Front verandah
- Pantry
- Kitchen
- Laundry
- Maid's rooms
- Dairy
- Bachelors' rooms
- Lumber room
- Back verandah
- Coach House
- Yard
- Cellar

It also included the following rooms upstairs: a drawing room, five bedrooms and the hall.

In 1916 a valuer's list noted Llanarth consisting of the following elements:

- Dining room
- Hall
- 8 bedrooms
- Sitting room
- Drawing room
- Nursery
- 2 bedrooms off store room
- 2 bedrooms
- School room
- Man's room
- Store room and office
- Kitchen
- Wash house
- Verandah
- Back verandah
- Coach house
- Stables
- Cellar.

Numerous dignitaries were entertained at Llanarth, such as Lord and Lady Hopetoun and Lord Kitchener. John Hope, 7th Earl of Hopetoun, was born John Adrian Louis Hope in 1860 in Scotland, and was the first Governor-General of Australia from 1901 to 1903. Lord Kitchener, 1st Earl of Kitchener, was born Horatio Herbert Kitchener in 1850 in Ireland, and was a field marshal between 1900 and 1902 during the Second Boer War (1899-1902). A noteworthy incident occurred on 10 January 1910 when Lord Kitchener visited Llanarth for dinner, after he had unveiled the Boer War Memorial in Kings Parade in Bathurst.

In 1912 "The Estate" managed the property on behalf of the Smith family, following the death of Mary Smith in the same year. At the time of the property's sale, the furniture was valued at £500. It appears that after the death of Mary Smith, none of the Smith's children lived in the house with their families.

In 1916 Fergus Jago Smith and Lancelot S. Smith (of Molong), sons of the late John Smith and trustees of his will, sold the property to Jerome William McGuire, a butcher in Bathurst. Smith's other children, Mr E. A. Smith, Mr Claude Smith (of Katoomba), the late Mr Wallace Smith, Mrs R. D. Barton (of Wellington), Mrs H. E. Holt (of Sydney), Mrs C. Barton (of Bathurst), Mrs W. a'Beckett (of Wellington) and Mrs M. a'Beckett (of Sydney), also mourned his loss.

Frederick Henry Roberts, a grazier in Bathurst, purchased the property in March 1924 from Jerome William Maguire, a butcher in Bathurst, for £1600. The property was Portion 140 of Hawkin's original land grant. Roberts was born in 1860 in Bathurst. He married Alice Helena Walshaw. Roberts was famous for his discovery of gold at Meekatharra in Western Australia, along with his brothers, Andrew, Jack and Charles. Roberts died in 1935 but the property remained in the ownership of the Roberts' family. At this time Alice Helena Roberts, Archibald John Roberts, Frederick William Roberts, Clarence Raynor Walshaw Roberts, and Spencer McDonald Roberts appear to have managed the property until it was formally transferred to the ownership of Arthur Christopher Roberts around 1937.

During occupation of the house by the Robert's family between 1924 and 1973 the opening between the kitchen and living and dining rooms was altered (these rooms are now referred to as the kitchen, family/TV room and family dining room) . The property was sold in 1973 to Dr Douse or Doust according to Dawn Hollows (pers. comm. 2008). The Bathurst Orange Development Corporation (BODC) purchased Llanarth from Dr Douse in 1976 and a number of proposals were considered including complete restoration. In November 1979 the Bathurst Orange Development Corporation wrote to the Heritage Council requesting funding assistance for restoration works to the property, also noting potential leasing arrangements to Mr and Mrs G. Downer.

Considering the poor state of the property in later years, it is possible that funding was not provided and restoration works were not undertaken or were not undertaken to the extent that was required. In July 1979 an article in a local paper entitled 'House Fate is Topic' mentions the disrepair of the "Llanarth House", that a group of people from the local community consider the property to be a "great asset" to the community, and its future would be discussed at a meeting at the "West Bathurst Community House" in Stewart on Thursday at 7:30 pm, with an invitation for people to come along to offer "their thoughts or ideas" for its future. It is not known the outcome of this meeting, but subsequent owners of the property did undertake necessary restoration works.

Another article in the local paper suggests that when the property had a tenant, under the ownership of the BODC, the house was in better repair.

In 1979 Mrs Mary Steel and Mr Arthur Roberts were the registered owners of the property.

The Bathurst and Orange Development Company (BODC) purchased the house with the intention of developing the land. The BODC was developing land in the Bathurst/Orange/Blayney triangle in NSW, providing incentives for owners and investors, including lower rents, rail-freight concessions and low land costs. The BODC was dissolved in 1992 having operated for around 17 years when the Growth Centres (Development Corporations) Act 1974 was amended.

In May 1980 Colin F. C. Crisp, Principal Engineer at firm McBean and Crisp Pty Ltd, prepared a Structural Engineer's Report for Llanarth for the purpose of identifying the likely causes of structural damage and advising on suitable action for the owners, BODC. Colin Crisp was well known for his conservation work to heritage structures and had a long association with the NSW Branch of the National Trust.

During his site visit in January 1980 Crisp noted the following structural problems and remedies

- The rear (southern) portion of the east wall of the house, which was an addition to the original residence, was added without "toothing in" to old brickwork; the butt joint has become the focus of movement between the new and old wall; there are several cracks along the southern portion of this wall; tops of the north and south chimney has been removed, but the centre one remains;
- Significant cracking on the east end of the ground floor verandah on the northern wall of the house; other cracking near windows along wall; No cracks on the northern end of the west wall of the house; cracking near chimney and first and ground floor windows; top of northern chimney has been removed; minor cracking to kitchen wing;
- There are cracks over and under windows on the south wall of the house;
- Internally, cracks have been identified in the house in similar location to those externally, although they are obscured by render, plaster and wallpaper and there are some signs of repair works;
- Runoff from one of three downpipes on the house is collected in an underground tank; the underground tank is presumed to be brick lined and water may seep from the structure; further investigations are recommended in terms of its contribution to excess ground water;
- Cracking is evident on all four elevations of the coach house with the east wall the most severely damaged;
- Serious cracking is evident in north wall of the stables and it is in danger of collapsing at the west end, and the south wall is cracked at the west end; the east wall is relatively crack free; the roof water collected from the stables is not being directed to underground storage tanks and is causing problems on the ground at the western end;
- Cracking is caused by a lowering of soil strength and areas of soil saturation around the buildings which leads to differential settlement in the clay soils; it is proposed to add new guttering and downpipes to move water away from the buildings, and regularly maintain the guttering system;
- The proximity of the large trees to the house may exacerbate drainage from the roof by choking gutters;
- There is evidence of rising damp in areas of the coach house and main house, as it is considered that the damp-proof course with which the building was fitted has become ineffective in places;

there is evidence of fretting of mortar joints in brick courses close to the ground level; increased sub-floor ventilation and repair of joints required;

- Excess watering of plants in garden beds close to the house should be avoided; and
- Consideration should be given to underpinning all external walls due to the depth of the footings (300–500 mm); if the foundation was at 100–150 mm, settlement would be unlikely; which walls should be underpinned depends on cost and condition and could be done by a program of works.

It is not known the extent of repairs works undertaken, however a plan in his 1983 report shows areas where underpinning was recommended, the location of downpipes at the time, and the depth of footings.

William (Bill) Richard Cummings purchased the property in 1982 from the BODC. Cummings was a warrant officer in the Royal Australian Navy. Cummings purchased the house "because he left sorry about the dilapidated state of the home", and he was later sorry to sell the house due to his mother's ill heath. Shortly after purchasing the property Cummings set-about to restore the building, which he used as a country home. The house was decorated with period furniture, much purchased by Cummings, it was laid with plush red carpet throughout

In June 1982 R. M. Todd surveyed the property for Mr Cummings, DP 150460, consisting of 2.46 hectares (6 acres).

Mrs Mary Steele, daughter of Mr Frederick Roberts, never lived at Llanarth but visited the property to see her family from time to time. The Roberts family owned Llanarth from 1924 to 1973. On 16 October 1982 she revisited the house and recalled found memories of her visits and her family's occupation. She noted that Arthur Roberts, her brother, lived at the property from the age of 11 and took over the household when their father died, which was "in the room referred to as the Green Room, situated under the stairway".

Mrs Steele's account of the house during her family occupation included the front verandah being supported by four wooden columns instead of the cement balustrades, what is now the dining room was at one stage used as the master bedroom and the doorway leading to the family room (F1) and kitchen (K1) was added during their occupation. The green room (F1), off the kitchen, was then painted powder blue. The bedroom (B1) with the bay window was used as a private sitting room by Mrs Roberts, and at the time it had wallpaper in green, white and gold tones. The adjoining bedroom (B2) was used as a guest room.

Walking through the front door of the house, the entrance hall leads to the banquet hall. The dining room (D1) was used as a billiard room by the Roberts family and later as a TV room. The cavity on the north wall was used as a bookshelf. The butler's pantry (BK) was known as the cool room, but in the 1980s it was used as a pantry. The sitting room (SR) was used for many purposes, such as an extra bedroom or piano room. The two double French doors were draped with hand-made lace curtains, left behind by the Smith family, the wallpaper was a dark plain blue, and a piano stood in the corner beside the fireplace. The cavity on the eastern wall of this room was used as a feature to break up the monotony of this wall space. It was used as a bedroom for the "convalescing Mr Roberts Senior".

Mrs Steele (1982:2) referred to the family room (F1) as the green room. This room had all the walls and woodwork painted over in a pale green by Dr Douse. She described the kitchen as a reconstructed area of the house, and what is now a bathroom and laundry used to be the original pantry that only had access through the door off the courtyard verandah. At the time of Mrs Steele's visit in 1982 the kitchen walls were painted pale pink with evidence of blue and green showing through, and the floor was brick paving. The laundry and toilet (LP1) used to be the washhouse or bathroom with a boiler in the corner.

On the southern external wall of the laundry was a concrete slab on which stood a toilet. This toilet was referred to as "the three seater" as it had three separate but attached compartments with the size of the toilet seats ranging from small, medium and large. When septic came, Mr Roberts discarded this toilet arrangement and built the toilet standing at the end of the courtyard. The kitchen, laundry and toilet were all accessible only from the courtyard off the back verandah, with another door at the northern end of the kitchen verandah leading back into the house.

On the first floor of the house, Mrs Steele (1982:3) recalls the master bedroom was originally a ballroom. The small bedroom (B5) south of the master bedroom was occupied by Arthur Roberts when he was a child. Dr Douse redecorated the room in a yellow paper and curtains with motifs of children under a willow tree. This room may have originally had a fireplace, but when the rear section of the house was rebuilt during the Smith's occupation following the earlier fire, a fireplace was never reinstated.

Bedrooms on the north-eastern corner of the first floor were only referred to by Mrs Steele as having been wall papered. The upstairs bathroom had a floor to ceiling linen press, which covered the entire right side of the wall. All the rooms in the house were originally wall paper with numerous scatter rugs.

During the occupation by Dr Douse (1973–76) wallpaper was reinstated. Prior to this the house was painted in pale hues. The present owner, Mr Cummings, agreed that Mrs Steele could return to the house for another visit when she may be accompanied by her brother, Mr Arthur Roberts, who was not able to attend this visit due to ill health.

In 1982 Mr D. A. Rutherford, grandson of John Smith, recalled aspects of the house and owners in his notes. Mr Rutherford published a book in 2004 on the grandchildren of John Smith, and appears to have collected a lot of historical information regarding the property over many years. In his 1982 notes, Mr Rutherford refers to two names that are engraved on window panes in what is now the sitting room (SR). The engraved names were A. a'Beckett and May Innes.

Rutherford notes that A. a'Beckett was probably Arthur Martin a'Beckett (b. 1885 d. 1977), eldest son of W. C. a'Beckett and Gertrude Smith (6th daughter of John Smith), and the corresponding number engraved next to the name "93" may refer to a year, which would have made him 8 years of age. May Innes may have been Mary Emily Long Innes (b. 1873 d. 1964), eldest daughter of Justice Sir Joseph G. Long Innes and Emily Janet Smith (eldest daughter of John Smith), although the significance of the corresponding number is not known. These engravings, which look like scratching on the window panes of the French doors of the sitting room overlooking the front verandah are still legible today (2008).

On 15 February 1983 Mr Brian Costello from the firm Trevor-Jones, Small and Associates, Architects and Town Planners wrote to the Heritage Council of NSW on behalf of Mr Cummings for financial assistance to undertake restoration works to the property. The amount requested was $20,000 in the form of a grant or repayable loan, and the works would be based on recommendations made in the 1980 engineering report by McBean and Crisp. Tenders were called at this stage for reconstruction ($9,000), under-pinning ($26,400), replacement of roof materials to rear section of main house ($1,150) and internal plasterwork ($4,000). It was noted that Mr Cummings had spent around $30,000 to date on elevating stormwater problems and restoring the coach house as a caretakers' flat.

An application was submitted to the Heritage Council for funding for restoration works dated 13 March 1983 by Cummings (1983A), however the Heritage Office can not find records that any amount was approved for restoration works to the property. It appears that an original application was made for $20,000 grant and $10,000 that was amended to a $31,550 interest free loan following discussions with Heritage Office staff. The financial assistance was sought for "structural defects (underpinning), re-building stables, main building roof and internal plasterwork" to undertake urgent prevention of deterioration, permanent repairs and restoration. Details within the application suggest that Cummings was renting the property for a period of time and living in Dundas.

Subsequent investigations into the structure of the buildings found that the major problems were caused by broken downpipes, poor disposal systems and underground water from the hill behind the house. It appears from correspondence by Brian Costello, Architect, that the stormwater lines were reconstructed, a drainage trench was dug along the rear of the property that dispersed water either side of the buildings and a new septic tank was installed during 1983 and 1984. Rains mid 1984 have not had adverse affects on the building, and the structural problems seemed to have been stabilised.

It was noted by Costello (1983:3) that the underground tank in the rear courtyard may require ongoing maintenance including regular pumping out of water. It was also noted that a portion of the building had been re-roofed, which may be that of the kitchen and laundry. Restoration and conservation projects proposed as part of the works by Costello included: restoration of chimneys; reconstruction of original columns and balcony rail; repaint external buildings in original colour scheme; rebuild the original gate house; and rebuilding of structurally unsound walls on the stables. Costello (1983:5-6) included plans of the property where room uses were noted, which mentioned that the property was used as a schoolroom in the 1930s.

The property was proposed to be subdivided in August 1983 into three lots (Heritage Office, 2008B). The proposed lot for Llanarth, Lot 3, was 1.68 hectares or approximately 4 acres. Proposed lots 1 and 2 both have an entrance off Ophir Road and are approximately 1 acre each. It is noted in the Heritage Council minutes that the subdivision is not allowable under current zoning, but there is no objection on heritage grounds. The property was eventually approved for subdivision into this arrangement of three lots with the house having a reduced setting with the new western boundary fence quite close to the house.

On 3 November 1983 the Heritage Council considered a request from Mr Cummings to place a Permanent Conservation Order (PCO) over the property for the purpose of reducing local rates (Heritage Council minutes, 25-11-83 in Heritage Office, 2008B). On 28 November 1983 the PCO was approved by the Minister, and on 23 March 1984 the PCO was gazetted (Heritage Office 2008A).

Debbie and Ron White were the next owners in 1984. A formal party was held to change ownership of the house from the Cummings to the Whites. After purchasing the house, the White's said they were happy that the home was remaining in the ownership of a local family, and they planned to undertake further renovations and landscaping. The White family are said to have painted the walls white during their occupation.

Prior to the sale of the house in 1989, the house was advertised for sale in the Weekend Advocate (1989:18) boasting its near original materials, such as joinery, massive bathtub, iron lace on the balcony, huge kitchen range (Anthony Hordern, Sydney) and ceiling plasterwork.

David and Denise Roach purchased the property in 1989 and made improvements to the house. An auction brochure by LJ Hooker Real Estate firm (Heritage Office 2008B), perhaps at the time the Roach's purchased Llanarth, shows photographs of the house with the driveway looping to the front door, low brick wall on front verandah, and lean-to on the western side of the coach house and southern end of the kitchen and laundry. The hand pump and well in the external courtyard between the house and coach house shows its location near the kitchen, and what appears to be a hanging plant of some sort on the posts and roof of the verandah off the kitchen and laundry. The existing concrete surface in the external courtyard has levelled out the verandah surface and external paving, as well as covering the location of the hand pump and well.

The photos also show that the roller doors on the coach house have replaced the outward opening timber doors, the display stove in the kitchen by Anthony Hordens has been built into the fireplace for the kitchen, there is no carpet on the main staircase to the first floor in the house, the walls appear to be painted white, many of the rooms have chandelier lighting (now predominantly brass ceiling light fittings), and the flooring in the house appears to have been a light coloured carpet. The fireplace, surround and mantelpiece in the sitting room off the front verandah and main entrance is the same as it is today, as is the panelled glazing with flower decoration on the double doors off the hall to the dining room.

At this time the property was subdivided into three lots but dwellings were not built yet on the land west of the house. The hedge along the fence-line of the eastern boundary of the property along Bradwardine Road has not been planted, and the boundary was a low timber post and rail fence. It appears that this fence is still present, although the boundary fence for the property is now a higher metal fence that is located inside the hedge and timber post and rail fence. The dirt and gravel driveway that extends from the entrance of the property to the front door finished at this time in an alignment with the western wall of stables.

An application was submitted in 1989 to the Heritage Council for restoration and internal alterations, including new bathrooms, new verandah and fence (Heritage Office, 2008B). Ms Roach was living in Castle Hill at the time the application was submitted, so it is not known if they occupied the house.

Architect Henry Bialowas was engaged by the Roach's to undertake the alterations to Llanarth. Correspondence to the Heritage Council (1989) noted that some of the changes were functional, such as the dining room is to become the family room and the TV room becomes the family dining room. Other proposed changes included: a new fit out for the first floor main bathroom; a covered link between the garage and adjacent building by means of a fully glazed conservatory; and relocation of the verandah to the house. Not all of these changes were undertaken, although records do not indicate whether this was a change in the owner's preference or a request by local council or the Heritage Council.

In a submission to the Bathurst City Council for the proposed alterations to the house, the National Trust (1989) noted that the new kitchen, laundry, verandah and related windows were kept in the same character as the original house. It appears that this was undertaken, as the dimensions of the windows and doors to the kitchen and laundry (ground floor) are similar to that of the rest of the house but they lack the earlier detailed timber surrounds.

During the 1990s real estate company Raine and Horne put together a brochure on the property of Llanarth that included a short history and floor plan sketch (Raine and Horne nd). The house was noted as having been "painstakingly restored to its former glory, including rewiring, new plumbing and drainage, stormwater etc and all modern connivances including a massive kitchen and full natural gas central heating". The floor plan sketch and codes were used in the preparation of this report.

The configuration of the house at this time was noted as having 27 rooms. The main house consists of:

- Master bedroom suite (3 rooms: bedroom of magnificent proportions, large ensuite and dressing room)
- 5 additional bedrooms
- 1 bathroom (plus ensuite)
- 2 powder rooms
- Formal entrance hall
- Formal sitting room
- Formal dining room
- Butlerette (with own kitchen) off formal dining room
- Informal dining room
- Family/TV room
- Laundry
- Main kitchen (of restaurant size).

The coach house is two-storey with a basement cellar. Rooms on the ground floor consist of:

- 2 single lift up garages
- Single car port
- 1 bedroom flat (with kitchen and bathroom)
- Storeroom
- Power room

and on the first floor of the coach house there is a flat consisting of:

- 2 bedrooms
- Bathroom
- Laundry
- Lounge room
- Kitchen
- Dining room.

The stables consists of:

- Blacksmith shop
- Track room
- Horse stalls (with original cedar timber)
- 65 foot long hay loft.

The property also includes:

- 3 wells (only two accessible)
- Central heating
- Town water
- Sewerage
- Natural gas
- Separate power and phone supply to coach house.

Bathurst Council listed the property as a heritage item on their local environment plan in March 1987. In July 1993 the National Trust of Australia listed the property on their heritage register. In mid 1995 Bathurst City Council received an application for a two lot subdivision and erection of two residential dwellings on the land west of "Llanarth". It appears that this application was approved by Bathurst City Council and the Heritage Council and dwellings were built on the land west of "Llanarth" a short time later.

The Western Advocate published an article on 18 December 1995 in which David and Denise Roach received a National Trust Heritage Award for their extensive restoration and conservation of 'Llanarth'. The article mentions the family use every room for business and personal functions, and that the original school room is now used as a family room. It also noted that the Stranger's room, which does not have internal access within the house, only an external door to the front verandah for people calling on business, is adjacent to the school room and is now used as a family living room. Rooms within the coach house were original said to have been used for the coachman and groom at the time.

During the occupation by the Roach family between 1989 and 2001 the verandah was paved with sandstone block, but these needed to be replaced due to subsistence. The verandah was resurfaced in tiles, which are present today on several surfaces throughout the property.

In April 1999 Llanarth was transferred onto the State Heritage Register.

'Llanarth' was again in the newspapers in 1999 with tenders requested for its sale by Century 21 Mid West Realty of Bathurst (The Sun Herald 1999:57), noting many of the previous owners and the extensive restoration that many undertook. Both articles mention the house is nestled amongst 150 year old cedar, cypress and budwilli (Araucaria bidwillii, bunya pine) trees.

Allan and Robyn Munro purchased the property in 2001 followed by another couple several years later. The Munro's restored the property, which was affected by bird infestation in the chimneys, rising damp in the walls of the formal dining room due to the former owner's concreting the courtyard, and poor renovations. Before moving in to the property the Munro's had to clean the internal spaces of bird droppings before installing their furniture. Other work that may have been carried out by the Munro's includes installation of the existing entrance gate and fence, and polishing the floorboards under the carpets on the staircase and bedrooms, which was referred to as 'future projects' in the 2002 newspaper article.

An article in the Western Times in 2003 by the Bathurst Flooring Specialists illustrated the "flooded gum Big River timber floor" in the new kitchen fitout in "Llanarth".

'Llanarth' was up for sale again and in the papers in January 2005 for $1,600,000 and in May 2006 for $1,790,000, both times making the front page with the striking picture of the front facade and garden.

In April 2005 the history of "Llanarth" was presented in the Western Advocate by the National Trust as part of their Diamond Jubilee celebrations (1945 - 2005), including details of its numerous owners and their families.

The current owners purchased the property in April 2007).

== Description ==
=== Grounds/Site ===
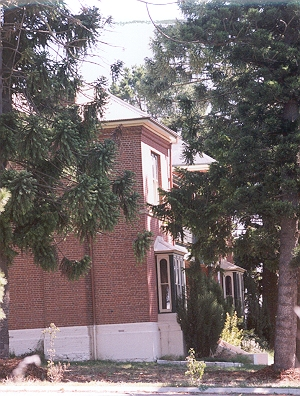
Side view

The property is approximately 4.2 acres and the buildings are situated towards the rear of the lot which slopes downhill to the north and has views to Macquarie River. The property is located in the suburb of Llanarth in the township of Bathurst. It is surrounded by recent residential development and sub-divided allotments. Eglinton Road may potentially be widened, which is why the front portion of several allotments along this part of the road was subdivided to form crown land in the last few years. There is a gentle slope down to the north in the area of the subject property. Neighbouring properties are predominantly new developments. The two dwellings west of Llanarth were originally part of the subject property, but they were subdivided and the dwellings constructed around 1995.

Formerly a rural setting, the grounds have established trees including a number of bunya-bunya pines (Araucaria bidwillii) and hoop pines (A. cunninghamii). A long driveway from the Ophir Road (now Eglinton Road) to the north leads in to the house and loops in front (north) of it, also runs behind (south) of the house to the coach house and stables complex.

The 16.75ha lot is broadly a parallelogram in shape, its northern boundary facing the (then) Ophir Road. This was the PCO gazetted on 23/3/1984. A driveway running north–south near the eastern boundary approaches the main house and makes a large loop to its north. Another branch off this driveway goes behind the house to the south to outbuildings and stables.

The site is on the north-western outskirts of Bathurst on what was the main road to Hill End & Sofala's gold fields. The allotment is an irregular rectangular shape with an easement along the eastern boundary. The original allotment when the house was built was larger, but has been reduced several times.

Llanarth' consists of three main buildings: two-storey brick house; two-storey brick coach house (c.1858); and single-storey brick stables (c.1907). The stables may have replaced an earlier stables. The buildings are situated towards the rear of the allotment, which slopes downhill in a northerly direction. The property is used as a residence, which has been its only use in addition to various families using some rooms as a schoolhouse and office. It is surrounded by recent residential development and sub-divided allotments. Neighbouring properties are predominantly new developments. The land on which the two dwellings west of Llanarth are situated was originally part of the property, but the land was subdivided and built on around 1995.

=== House ===
Symmetrical main elevation with recessed two storey verandah set between protecting wings with rectangular single storey bays. It has a detached brick stables, a coach house, servants quarters and courtyard. The house is 55 squares in area and has fine unpainted cedar joinery and original ceilings.

Four panelled doors and original plaster ceilings - very fine cedar joinery unpainted and waxed. Doors have fielded panels and are beaded down centre. Elaborate consoled mantel in front drawing room. Very elaborate plaster rose on drawing room ceilings - geometric stair even 11/7 handrail 2 foot 5 inches. Handsome symmetrical reception room on first floor with french doors to balcony consoled mantel. 55 squares. Two projecting bay verandahs supported on timber columns - balcony, cast iron supports. House has stone dressings and stone flagged verandahs.

Windows - double hung but simulate casement windows - all windows shuttered. Large servants' quarters with cellar beneath. Back section added later.

The large (55 squares) two storey house was built in the Victorian Italianate architectural style in 1858 with red brick in Flemish Bond (alternate courses of headers and stretchers) on the front facade. The rear section of the house was burnt down in the 1860s and rebuilt a short time later. The roof form is hipped at the front (east–west alignment) with hipped extensions on the two bays on the sides of the front roof. The rear roof form of the residence is a series of four hipped roofs with a northsouth alignment, sitting behind the front hipped roof form. The roof material is silver galvanised steel with dark green box gutters.

Downpipes are predominantly painted to match the red bricks, except where potentially replaced. The house consists of nine rooms and two halls on the ground floor, and eight rooms and three halls on the first floor. The internal spaces are mostly intact however there has been substantial alteration to certain rooms, such as the kitchens and bathrooms that do not have any original fittings or fixtures except window and some door joinery. Intact features in the house include: door and window joinery; ceiling roses and cornice plasterwork; timber stair to first floor; niches in sitting room and family room walls; and most of the chimney pieces, grates, chimney breasts and tiled hearths.

There are seven chimneys: three on the eastern facade, two on the western facade, one in the single storey kitchen on the western facade, and one in the master bedroom visible from the northern facade. The chimneys are all brick with a bed moulding of bricks and dentils to match the Italianate design of the house.

The front verandah has three wooden timber posts supporting the first floor balcony with a relatively recent timber scalloped facia. The tiles on the front entrance stairs and front verandah are recent additions to the property, and are the same materials as used in other rooms, such as the butler's pantry in the house and kitchen 1 in the coach house. The front verandah was originally sandstone flagging and it is not known if any of this fabric remains under the current tile surface.

The front balcony to the master bedroom has an iron balustrade, two supporting posts and fringe. The floor is timber. The height of the balustrade was raised within the last 10 years to meet BCA standards at that time.

External windows of the house are generally painted with a dark green stone sill and cream timber joinery around the window panes with cream louvered timber shutters. Other than shutters there is little decoration on any of the windows. Shutters are not fixed to every window, although there is evidence in the brickwork that this may have been the case. Some smaller shutters are painted cream with a green surround. Windows are all single-pane sash with curved heads, typical of the late Victoria period and Italianate style.

Some of the windows form groups of twos or threes, such as on the southern elevation of the house to the family lounge and dining room and the first floor bedroom 3. The groups of two windows have middle timber elements painted cream whilst the groups of three windows have the middle timber elements painted green with cream inners. The windows predominantly have a flat arch of bricks above. Some windows have curved arches and may have been built at a later time or modified.

The dual timber front entry doors of the house have singular semi-circular headed panels. The two sets of doors off the sitting room onto the front verandah and three sets off the Master Bedroom onto the front balcony are all French doors with four panes and painted timber surrounds in cream or white. The front entry door, two sets of French doors and timber door to Dining room all have a concrete step down to the front verandah. The front entry door is the only external door unpainted on the exterior.

=== Stables/Coach House ===
Detached red brick stables built c.1858 with galvanised roof, coach house and servants' quarters to the rear of the house form an internal courtyard. Building Material: stone dressings and stone flagged verandah, original plaster ceilings, very fine cedar joinery.

The two-storey red brick Coach House was built in 1858. It has a hipped silver galvanised steel roof with an east–west alignment. The car port on the western end of the building has an extended hipped roof in light green galvanised steel, and was added around 1990. The two coach rooms have been converted to garages and the top of their arches were in-filled with brick when metal roller doors were added in the late 1980s. Internally, the coach house have been substantially altered including new a fitout to all bathrooms and kitchens, the doors leading from the ground floor internal rooms to the garages have been bricked-up, conversion of doors to windows with the removal of the original timber stair on the northern facade, and removal of fireplace elements.

Intact features in the coach house include: some door and window joinery and general spatial layout. The ground floor consists of the following rooms: garage 1, garage 2, living and dining room, bathroom 2, kitchen, bathroom 1 and storage room. The cellar is located under the coach house. There is an external stair on the northern facade that accesses the first floor of the coach house that consists of the following rooms: kitchen 2, living room, bedroom 1, bedroom 2, hall and bathroom 3.

The house and coach house have been altered by various owners, including some unsympathetic alterations in the 1980s and 1990s. This report recommends works to conserve significant fabric, such as investigations and repairs of cracking of internal and external walls, and a structural analysis of the stables. Maintenance works will ensure the ongoing conservation and repair of all fabric. The original roof materials were timber shingles. The galvanised iron roof was added over the shingles.

The western facade's front chimney has had detailing removed. The back verandah to the kitchen has four wooden posts with a galvanised steel roof. This verandah was a recent addition to the kitchen.

The front verandah has three wooden timber posts supporting the first floor balcony with a relatively recent timber scalloped facia. The tiles on the front entrance stairs and front verandah are recent additions to the property, and are the same materials as used in other rooms, such as the butler's pantry in the house and kitchen 1 in the coach house. The front verandah was originally sandstone flagging and it is not known if any of this fabric remains under the current tile surface.

The front balcony to the master bedroom has an iron balustrade, two supporting posts and fringe. The floor is timber. The height of the balustrade was raised within the last 10 years to meet BCA standards at that time.

External windows of the house are generally painted with a dark green stone sill and cream timber joinery around the window panes with cream louvered timber shutters. Other than shutters there is little decoration on any of the windows. Shutters are not fixed to every window, although there is evidence in the brickwork that this may have been the case. Some smaller shutters are painted cream with a green surround. Windows are all single-pane sash with curved heads, typical of the late Victoria period and Italianate style.

Some of the windows form groups of twos or threes, such as on the southern elevation of the house to the family lounge and dining room and the first floor bedroom 3. The groups of two windows have middle timber elements painted cream whilst the groups of three windows have the middle timber elements painted green with cream inners. The windows predominantly have a flat arch of bricks above. Some windows have curved arches and may have been built at a later time or modified.

=== Condition ===
As at 1 December 2008 the internal spaces were reported to be mostly intact however there had been substantial alteration to certain rooms, such as the kitchens and bathrooms that do not have any original fittings or fixtures except window and some door joinery. Intact features in the house include: door and window joinery; ceiling roses and cornice plasterwork; timber stair to first floor; niches in sitting room and family room walls; and most of the chimney pieces, grates, chimney breasts and tiled hearths.

It has archaeological potential to reveal further information about the layout of the garden, internal courtyard and other buildings on the site.

There were several small buildings adjacent to Llanrth in the 1870s but the one most prominent was a cottage in front at the entrance gates, known as 'coachman's cottage'. Mr Tyne and his family lived in the coachman's cottage for quite some time.

=== Modifications and dates ===
- 1858 - Llanarth constructed.
- 1860s - rear portion burnt down and later rebuilt.
- 1981: 6.5acres of historic curtilage - of which a minimum of 4 acres was garden. Formerly its northern boundary was the Ophir Road. This was realigned further north in the 1980s with residential development in the area. A 1982 survey showed a curtilage of 2.46ha.A proposed subdivision dated 17/8/1983 was into 3 lots, with Llanarth on 1.657ha, and 2 4000m2 lots alongside to its west, all facing the Ophir Road (Lot 2 down a battleaxe driveway between lot 1 & 3 (Llanarth)).
- c. 1995: The two dwellings west of Llanarth were originally part of Llanarth, but were subdivided and dwellings constructed around 1995.

=== Recent Subdivision history ===
- 1982 the property consisted of DP 150460, 2.46 hectares (6 acres).
- 1984 subdivided into three lots, Lots 1, 2 and 3 in DP 710184. Lot 3 in DP 710184 was the land containing "Llanarth" (1.68 hectares or 4.2 acres), and Lots 1 and 2 in DP 710184 were both west of "Llanarth", rural land.
- 23/3/1984: Permanent Conservation Order over "Llanarth" gazetted for Part Lot 1 in DP 150460. Heritage Office (2008B) records show that the property was subdivided by Bathurst City Council whilst the Minister was considering the PCO, therefore the PCO was gazetted for Part Lot 1 in DP 150460 instead of Lot 3 in DP 710184.
- 1 June 1984 Government Gazette No. 86 confirmed the subdivision of Lot 1 in DP 150462 into Lots 1, 2 and 3 in DP 710184 (0.4, 0.4 and 1.68 hectares consecutively) under the Bathurst Planning Scheme Ordinance. The Ordinance was repealed when the Bathurst Local Environmental Plan 1987 came into effect.
- 1994 Bathurst City Council proposed to rezone Lots 1 and 2 in DP 710184 (west of "Llanarth", now Lot 3 in DP 710184) from 1(a) General Rural to 2(a) General Residential, allowing dwellings to be erected on these properties, however this did not go ahead.
- late 1994 or early 1995 'Llanarth' was consolidated with the land to the east along Bradwardine Road, Lot 15 in DP 800657 to form the new property boundary, Lot 1 in DP 808063
- Mid 1995 Bathurst City Council received an application for a two lot subdivision and erection of two residential dwellings (land west of 'Llanarth'). It appears that this application was approved by Bathurst City Council and the Heritage Council and dwellings were built on the land west of "Llanarth".

== Heritage listing ==
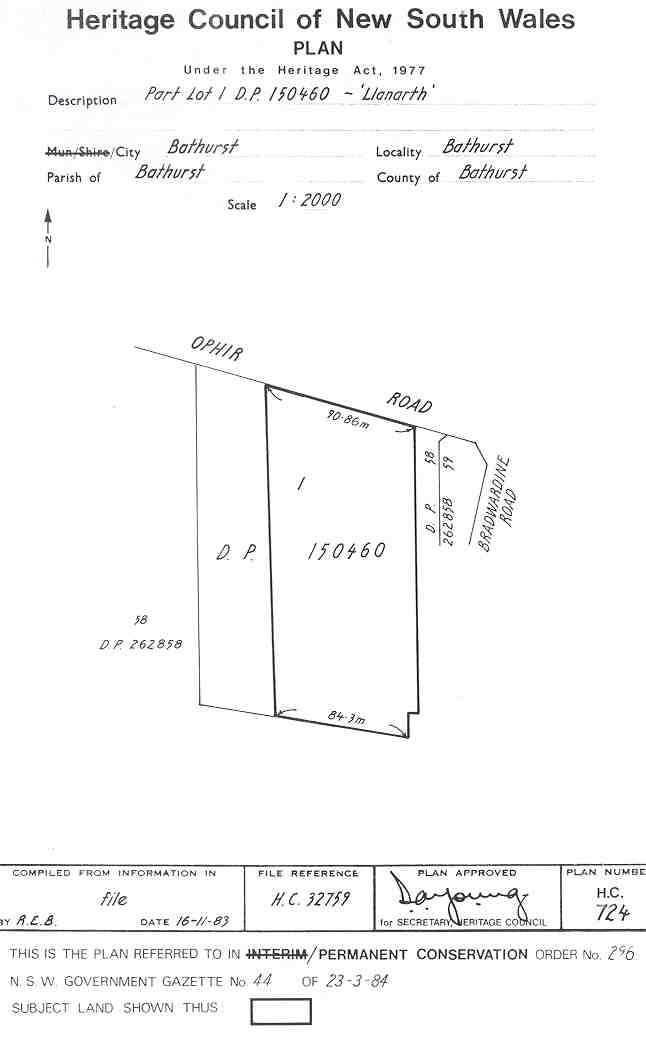
Heritage boundarie

Constructed in 1858, Llanarth is a large two storey Victorian Italianate mansion of red face brick under a hipped roof with a complex of brick outbuildings forming an internal courtyard, set in a generous garden area with large, mature trees including Bunya and hoop pines. The property is associated with Mr W Atkins, Thomas Jarman Hawkins of Walmer who was later Coroner, Commissioner of Crown Lands, Gold Commissioner. The first wine grapes west of the Blue Mountains were planted by Rankine and Hawkins on the land between Llanarth and Excelsior. The property is associated with the Hastings and Smith families, the latter living here from the 1860s until 1916 and Mr Fred Roberts who was famous for his discovery of gold at Meekatharra in Western Australia with his brothers Andrew, Jack & Charles. The Roberts family held the property until the late 1970s (Heritage Branch file).

Llanarth was listed on the New South Wales State Heritage Register on 2 April 1999.
