= West Bathurst, New South Wales =

West Bathurst New South Wales
- Coordinates: 33°24′35″S 149°33′55″E
- Population: 3,672 (2016 census)
- Postcode(s): 2795
- LGA(s): Bathurst Region
- State electorate(s): Bathurst
- Federal division(s): Calare

West Bathurst is a suburb of Bathurst in the Bathurst Region, New South Wales, Australia.

== Heritage listings ==
West Bathurst has a number of heritage-listed sites, including:

- 56 Suttor Street: Number 470 Fire Bell
