= Llanarth, New South Wales =

Llanarth
- Suburb
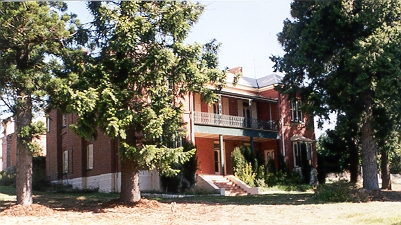
- Llanarth (heritage house)

- Interactive map of Llanarth
- Coordinates: 33°23′58″S 149°32′58″E
- Country: Australia
- State: New South Wales
- City: Bathurst
- LGA: Bathurst Region
- Location: 4 km (2.5 mi) NW of Bathurst

Government
  - State electorate: Bathurst
  - Federal division: Calare

Population
  - Total: 2,198 (2016 census)
- Postcode: 2795

Llanarth is a locality in the Bathurst Region of New South Wales, Australia, approximately 3 kilometres (1.9 mi) from Bathurst. It was named after the historic Llanarth property, established in 1858 by the Smith family after their previous home of Llanarth in Cornwall. It had a population of 2,198 people as of the 2016 census.

The area has been subject to large-scale residential development in recent years.

== Heritage listings ==
Llanarth has a number of heritage-listed sites, including:

- 120 Eglington Road: Llanarth
