= Australasian Photo-Review =

Australian photography magazine published 1894–1956

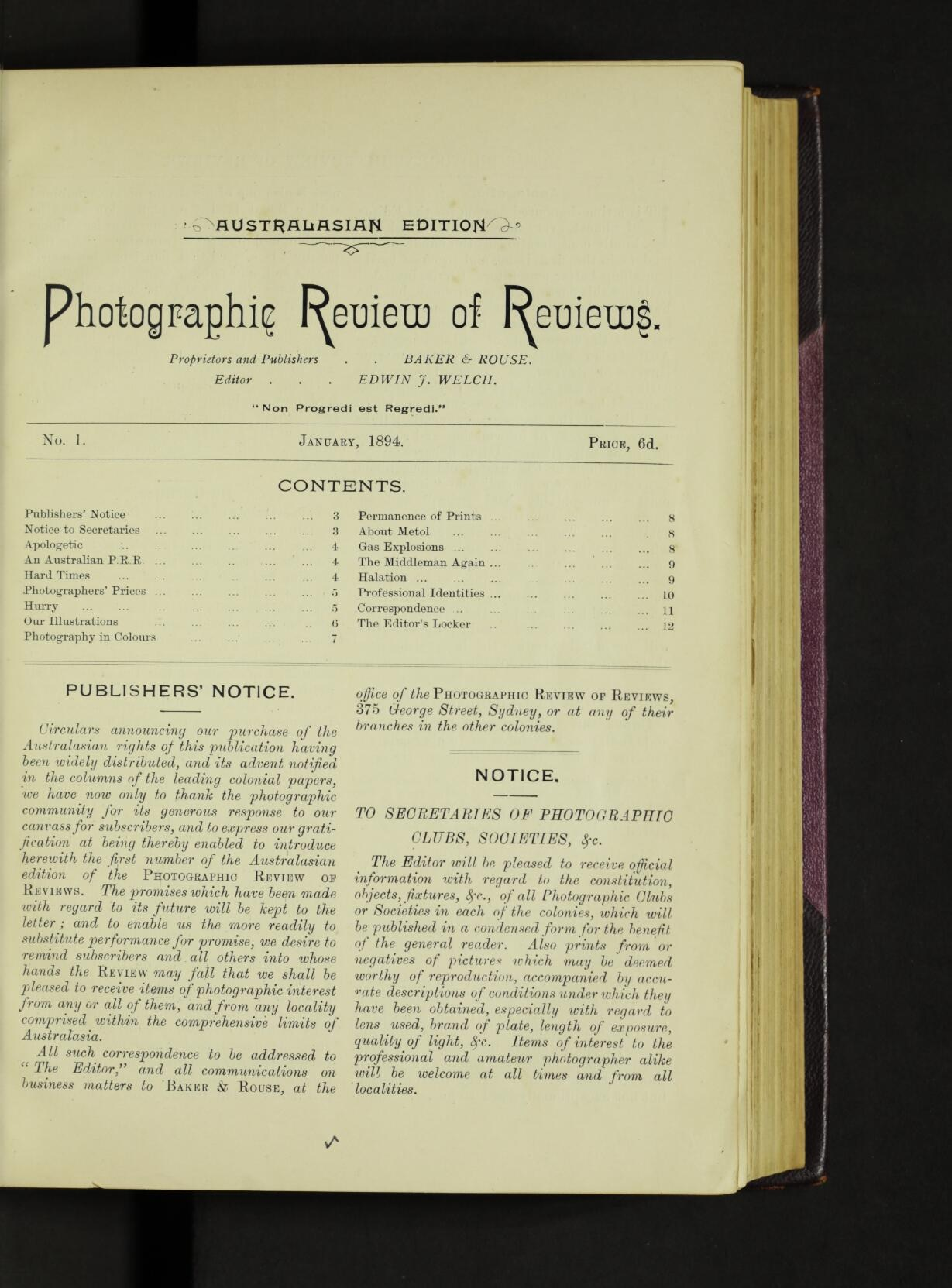
First page of the Australasian Photographic Review of Reviews, later the Australasian Photographic Review, later the Australasian Photo-Review.

The Australasian Photo-Review was an English language magazine, published for photographers by Baker & Rouse and later Kodak (Australasia), and published in Sydney, Australia 1894–1956.

== History ==
The magazine was first published in 1894 as the Australian edition of the British Photographic Review of Reviews, after the photographic supply company Baker & Rouse purchased the Australasian publishing rights. At this early stage of its publication, the magazine was issued as a short ten to fifteen page supplement to the British edition. In 1895 the magazine's name was changed to Australalasian Photographic Review, and in 1903, the title was shortened to Australasian Photo-Review.

The first editor-in-chief of the magazine was Edwin J. Welch F.R.G.S., F.R.C.I., who declared in the first issue that Australian photographic works would be reviewed with 'bluntness, perhaps, but no namby pamby'. Walter Burke F.R.P.S. was Editor. In 1922 Walter's son Eric Keast Burke became associate editor and, in 1943 editor, a position he held until the Review ceased publication in 1956 with the last issue released in December.

== Content ==
The Review was notable for promoting the work of Australian photographers or 'camerists', as they were referred to in early editions, and for its high-grade reproduction of photographs.

At a time when the nation's history of photography was scant and under-appreciated, Keast Burke's series of historical articles included articles on pioneering Australian photographers John William Lindt and Charles Kerry and on his 1953 discovery, in a shed in Chatswood, New South Wales, B. O. Holtermann’s collection of wet-plate negatives; all gold-fields photographs by Charles Bayliss and Beaufoy Merlin to whom he devoted several issues of AP-R, and later published Gold and silver : an album of Hill End and Gulgong photographs from the Holtermann Collection in 1973.

His father Walter had also been historically minded and both Keast's son Quentin, and wife Iris, assisted in research and article writing for the AP-R. Jack Cato consulted extensively with Keast in writing his 1955 history The Story of the Camera in Australia. Having formally retired in 1960, from 1961 to 1969 Burke was the first editor and then art director of Australian Popular Photography (later named Australian Photography)

== Digitisation ==
The magazine has been digitised by the National Library of Australia.
