= Eric Keast Burke =

Australian photographer and journalist

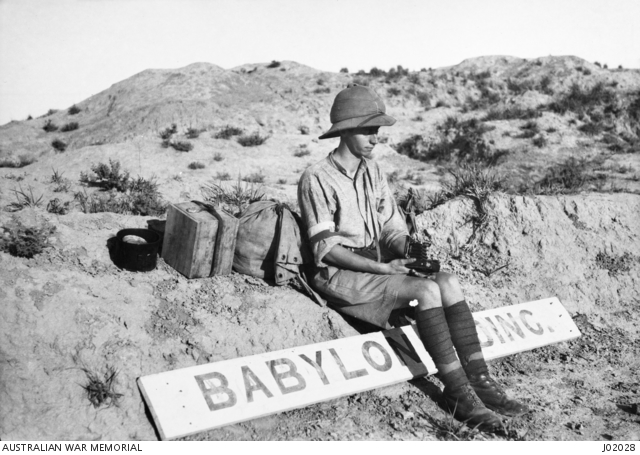
- Eric Keast Burke
- Born: 16 January 1896; Christchurch, New Zealand
- Died: 31 March 1974 (aged 78); Concord, New South Wales, Australia

Eric Keast Burke (16 January 1896 – 31 March 1974) was a New Zealand-born Australian photographer and journalist.

== Early life and education ==
Burke was born at Christchurch, New Zealand. He was the only child of Walter Ernest Burke, and his wife Amy Eliza Mary, nee Thompson. He went to Sydney with his family in March 1904 and was educated at Sydney Church of England Grammar School and the University of Sydney where he studied economics.

== War service ==
During World War I, after a year in the Signal Corps, Australian Military Forces, he enlisted in the Australian Imperial Force. He embarked for the Middle East in December 1917 and served as a sapper with the 1st Australian Wireless Signal Squadron, Mesopotamian Expeditionary Force. He was discharged on 28 January 1920 on his return to Sydney.

On 23 November 1925, he married Iris Lily Daniell.

During World War II, he served as a captain in the Volunteer Defence Corps, and worked in intelligence.

== Photography and research ==
In 1922 he became associate-editor, under his father, of the Australasian Photo-Review. He exhibited his work in Australia, Europe, London and the United States of America, and in 1938 was elected an associate of the Royal Photographic Society of Great Britain for a portfolio of male figure studies. That year he was appointed Australian chairman of Kodak International Salons of Photography.

He edited the Australasian Photo-Review from 1943–1956.

Recognizing the significance of photography to Australian history, in 1943 Burke published a series of articles on early photographers, among them William Jevons, J. W. Lindt and Charles Kerry. His wife, Iris, became his valued research assistant.

In 1952 Burke located the Holtermann Collection of wet-plate negatives and recommended its donation to the Mitchell Library in Sydney; in a shed in Chatswood, New South Wales, glass plates created by Beaufoy Merlin and Charles Bayliss were ranged in 'neat stacks of cedar boxes of various dimensions, each with slotted fittings which held the large negatives in perfect preservation.' The negatives disclosed 'every detail of the lives of our gold-fields pioneers'. He devoted several issues of AP-R to the discovery.

Burke provided his expertise to Jack Cato through regular correspondence as the latter was researching for his The Story of the Camera in Australia, published in 1955. In 1956 after the Australasian Photo-Review folded, he was employed as advertising manager for the Kodak Company.

== Later life ==
Having formally retired at 64 in 1960, from 1961 to 1969 Burke was the first editor and then art director of Australian Popular Photography (later named Australian Photography), a contributor to the Australian Dictionary of Biography and a frequent judge of photographic competitions. As consultant in photography to the National Library of Australia, Canberra, he oversaw the preservation of historic photographs. He later published Gold and silver : an album of Hill End and Gulgong photographs from the Holtermann Collection in 1973. Burke lectured on the collection, prepared exhibitions and presented a television series, 'Peeps into the Past with Keast Burke', for the Australian Broadcasting Commission. His other interests included bushwalking, native flora and fauna, genetics, maps and map-making, amateur radio, architecture and engineering.

Eric Keast Burke died on 31 March 1974 in Concord Repatriation General Hospital and was cremated. He was survived by his wife Lilly, a daughter and three sons.

== Works ==
- Burke, Keast; Australian and New Zealand Wireless Signal Squadron History. Committee (1927), With horse and morse in Mesopotamia : the story of Anzacs in Asia, A. & N.Z. Wireless Signal Squadron History. Committee]
- Burke, Keast (1932), Achievement : a collection of unusual studies of the Sydney Harbour Bridge, McPherson's
- Burke, Keast (1973), Gold and silver : an album of Hill End and Gulgong photographs from the Holtermann Collection, Heinemann, ISBN 978-0-85561-005-0
