= Bernhardt Holtermann =

Australian businessman, photographer and politician (1838–1885)

Bernhardt Otto Holtermann
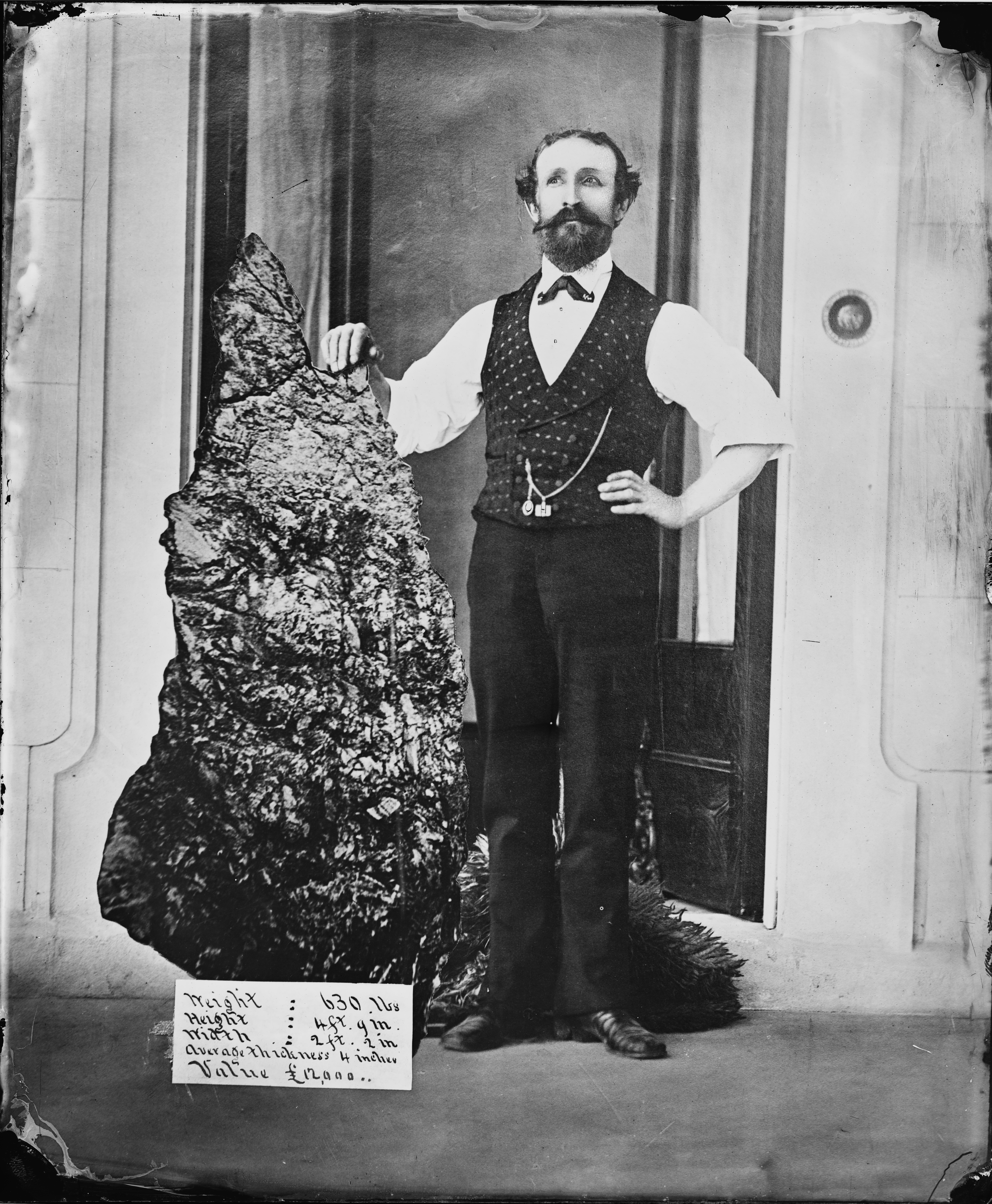
- Holtermann and the gold specimen discovered at Star of Hope Mine in 1872
- Born: 29 April 1838; Hamburg, Germany
- Died: 29 April 1885 (aged 47); St Leonards, New South Wales, Australia
- Resting place: St Thomas's Cemetery
- Occupations: gold miner, businessman and politician
- Years active: 1858–1885
- Spouse: Harriet Emmett
- Children: 6
- Relatives: Hugo Louis Beyers (brother-in-law and business partner)

Bernhardt Otto Holtermann (29 April 1838 – 29 April 1885) was a German-born Australian gold miner, businessman, politician and photographer. Perhaps his greatest claim to fame is his association with the Holtermann Nugget, the largest gold specimen ever found, 59 inches (1.5 m) long, weighing 630 pounds (290 kg) and with an estimated gold content of 3,000 troy ounces (93 kg), found at Hill End, near Bathurst, New South Wales. This gave him the wealth to build a mansion in North Sydney.

== Early life ==
Holtermann was born in Hamburg, Germany. He emigrated in 1858 to avoid Prussian military service. He departed Liverpool aboard the ship Salem and reached Melbourne in August after a journey lasting 101 days.

== Mining ==
After working at a variety of jobs, he teamed up with Ludwig Hugo 'Louis' Beyers. They began prospecting around Hill End, New South Wales. Years of unrewarding labour followed. On 22 February 1868, Holtermann married Harriett Emmett, while Beyers married her sister Mary.

In 1871, the Star of Hope Gold Mining Company, in which he and Beyers were among the partners, struck rich veins of gold. On 19 October 1872, the Holtermann Nugget was discovered. Not strictly speaking a nugget, it was a gold specimen, a mass of gold embedded in rock, in this case quartz. Holtermann attempted to buy the 3,000-troy-ounce (93-kilogram) specimen from the company, offering £1000 over its estimated value of £12,000 (about AU$1.9 million in 2016 currency, AU$4.8 million on the 2017 gold price), but was turned down, and it was sent away to have the gold extracted. Disheartened, he resigned from the company in February 1873.

== Later life ==
=== Photography ===
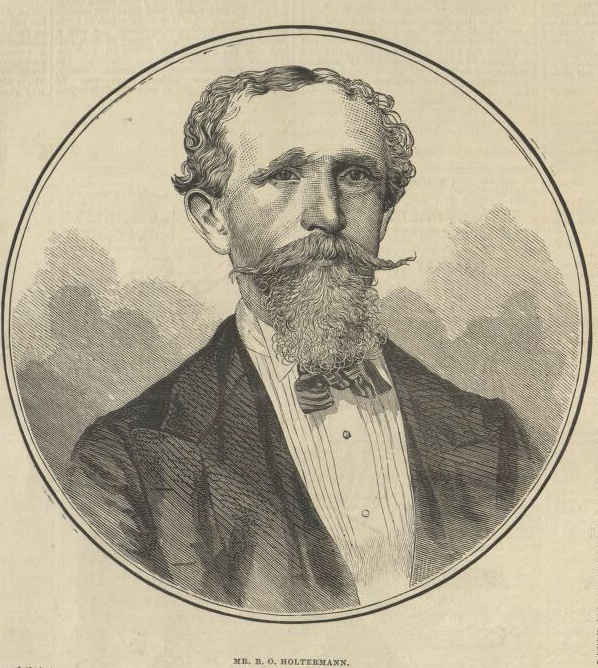
Bernhardt Holtermann in 1880

He built a large mansion, "The Towers" in North Sydney, complete with a stained glass window depicting himself and the specimen. Located at a panoramic location near Blue and William streets, he resided there until his death in 1885; the site is now occupied by the Sydney Church of England Grammar School. He invested wisely and kept his wealth, allowing him to take up his true passion of photography.

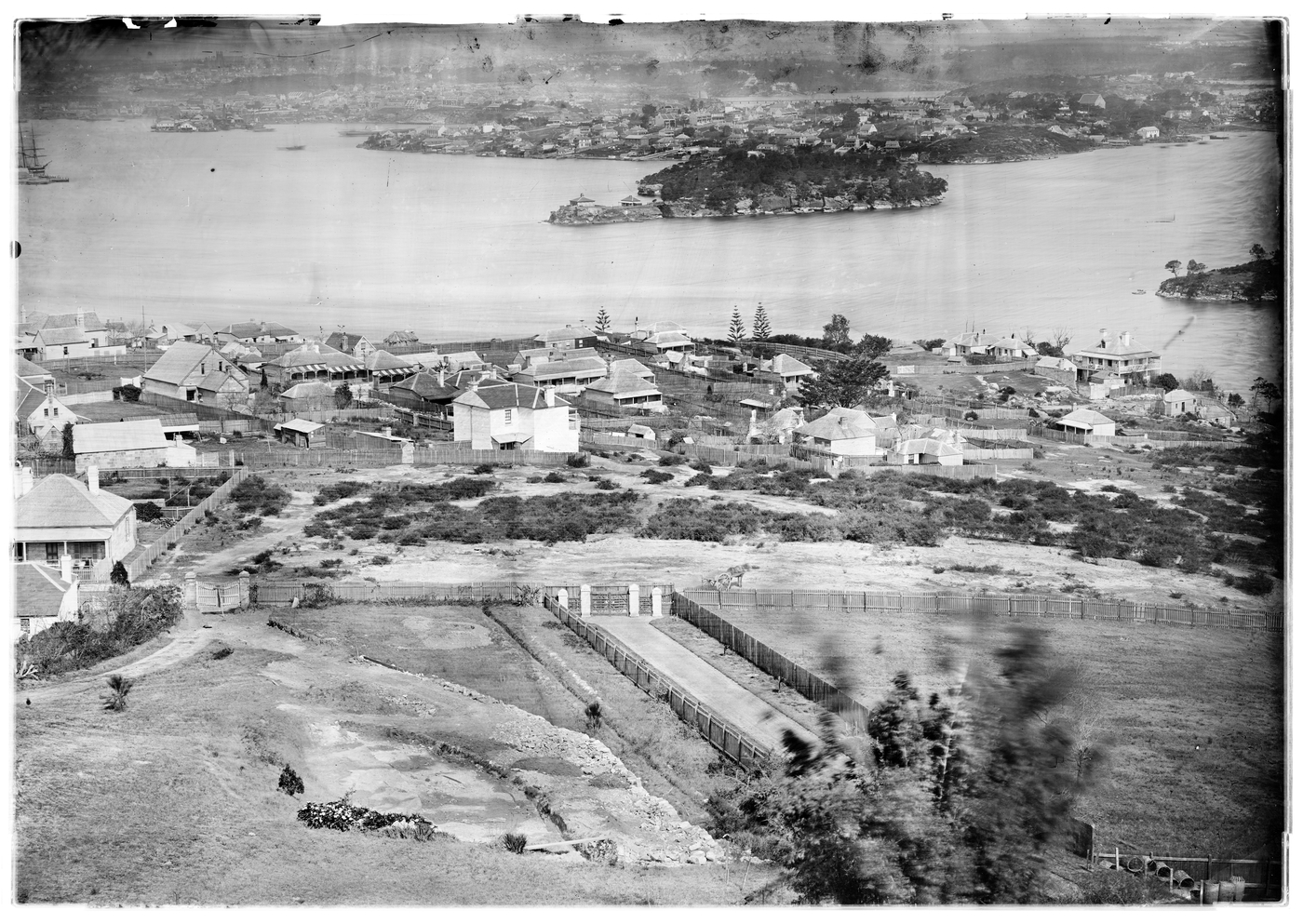
The view of Sydney Harbour from 'The Towers'

Holtermann financed and possibly participated in Henry Beaufoy Merlin's project to photograph New South Wales and exhibit the results abroad to encourage immigration. The work was taken up after Merlin's death in 1873 by his assistant, Charles Bayliss. In 1875, Holtermann and Bayliss produced the Holtermann panorama, a series of "23 albumen silver photographs which join together to form a continuous 978 centimetre [32 foot, 1 inch] view of Sydney Harbour and its suburbs." Some of the photographs, including the panorama, were displayed at the Philadelphia Centennial Exhibition, where they won a bronze medal. The panorama was also displayed at the 1878 Exposition Universelle Internationale in Paris.

Holtermann and Bayliss also made the largest glass plate negatives produced in the nineteenth century. These were made in Holtermann's tower in 1875. Almost seventy years after Holtermann's death, more than 3,000 of the negatives created by Merlin and Bayliss were retrieved from a garden shed in the Sydney suburb of Chatswood. The UNESCO-listed collection of negatives, known as the Holterman Collection, is housed in the State Library of New South Wales and presented in the Gulgong Holtermann Museum.

=== Politics ===
When the Hill End Borough Council was constituted on 6 August 1873, Holtermann was elected an alderman of the first council. In October 1874, Holtermann was elected an alderman in a special election for the Belmore Ward of the Borough of St Leonards.

In 1882, on his third try, Holtermann was elected to the New South Wales Legislative Assembly for St Leonards, which he served until his death.

=== Patent medicine ===
Holtermann was also interested in patent medicine. He was proud of having cured fellow passengers on his 1858 sea voyage to Australia. After he retired from mining, he wrote papers and devised formulae for medicines, and promoted and sold "Holtermann's Life Preserving Drops".

== Death ==
He died at age 47, in Sydney, Australia, on his birthday, 29 April 1885, of "cancer of the stomach, cirrhosis of the liver and dropsy", leaving a wife, three sons and two daughters.

== Bibliography ==
- Hein, Christoph: Australia 1872. How Bernhard Holtermann turned gold into a unique photographic treasure, Emons Verlag, Cologne 2020, ISBN 978-37408-0841-9

New South Wales Legislative Assembly
Preceded by James Farnell	Member for St Leonards; 1882–1885; With: Dibbs	Succeeded by Isaac Ives
