= Holtermann collection =

Negative & print collection

The Holtermann Collection
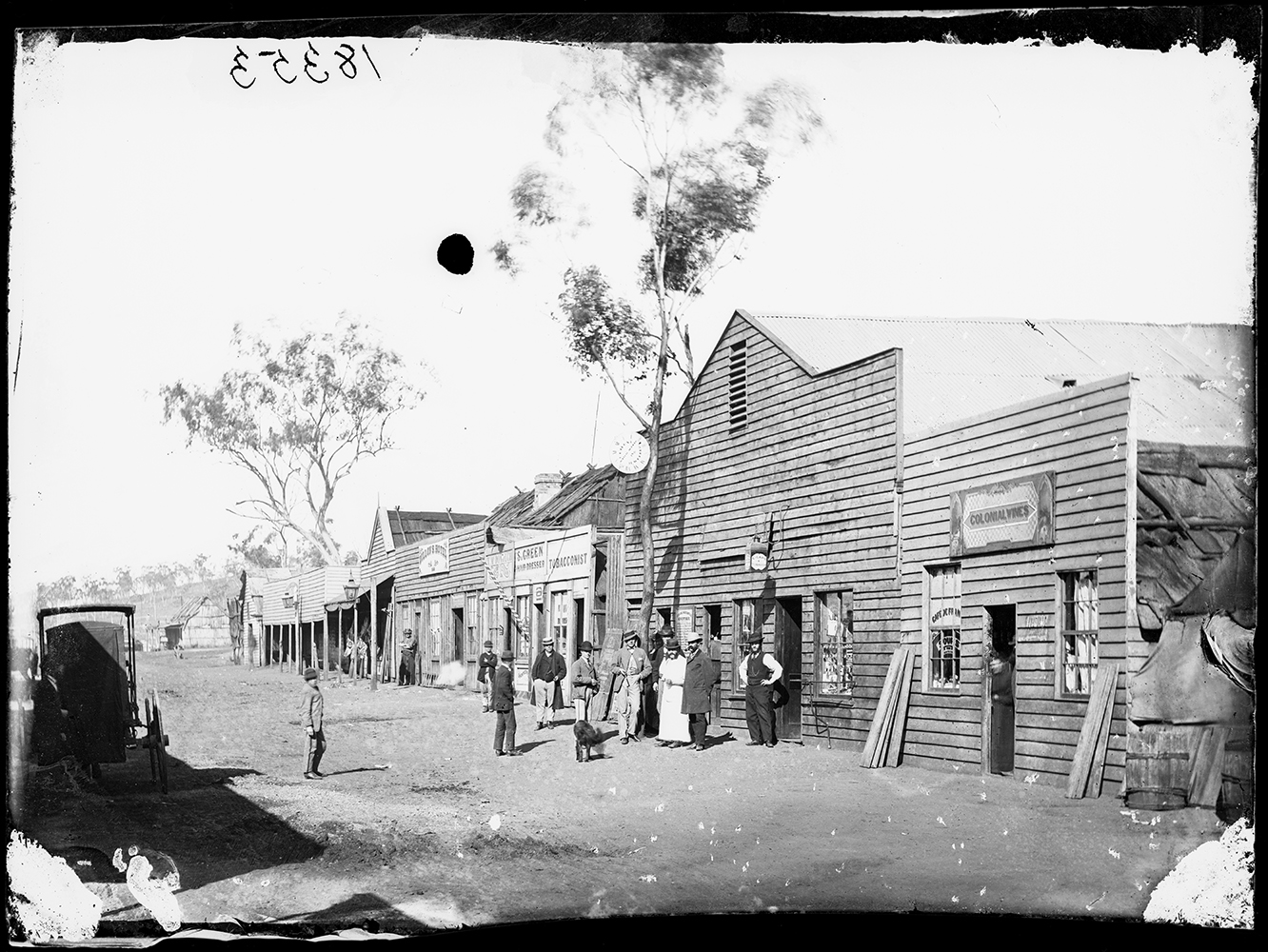
- Mayne Street Gulgong, 1872, by American & Australasian Photographic Company.
- Housed at: State Library of New South Wales
- Funded by: Government of New South Wales
- Size (no. of items): 3500+ photographic negatives and albumen prints
- Website: https://www.sl.nsw.gov.au/

The Holtermann Collection is the name given to a collection of over 3,500 glass-plate negatives and albumen prints, many of which depict life in New South Wales goldfield towns. It also includes numerous photographs of Australian rural towns and the cities of Sydney and Melbourne taken between 1871 and 1876. The collection is held by the State Library of New South Wales.

== Gold Rush, Regional Towns and Cities ==
Many of the 3500 wet-plate glass negatives and albumen prints in the Holtermann collection capture life in the goldfield towns of Hill End and Gulgong, Home Rule and Canadian Lead between 1872 and 1873. Photographs covering the goldfields, regional towns and cities in New South Wales and Victoria between 1871 and 1873 are attributed to the American and Australasian Photographic Company employees Beaufoy Merlin and Charles Bayliss. It also seems Bayliss is responsible for much of the later work from 1873 to 1876; sometimes with the assistance of Holtermann. Merlin had done commissioned work for Holtermann while at Hill End in 1872 but sometime around January 1873, Merlin was commissioned by Bernhardt Otto Holtermann to start taking photographs for his new 'Holtermann Exposition' project to promote Australia to the world. The Holtermann collection seems to have been formed around this time and Merlin may have contributed some of his earlier photographs to this project.

== The Colossal Glass Plate Negatives ==
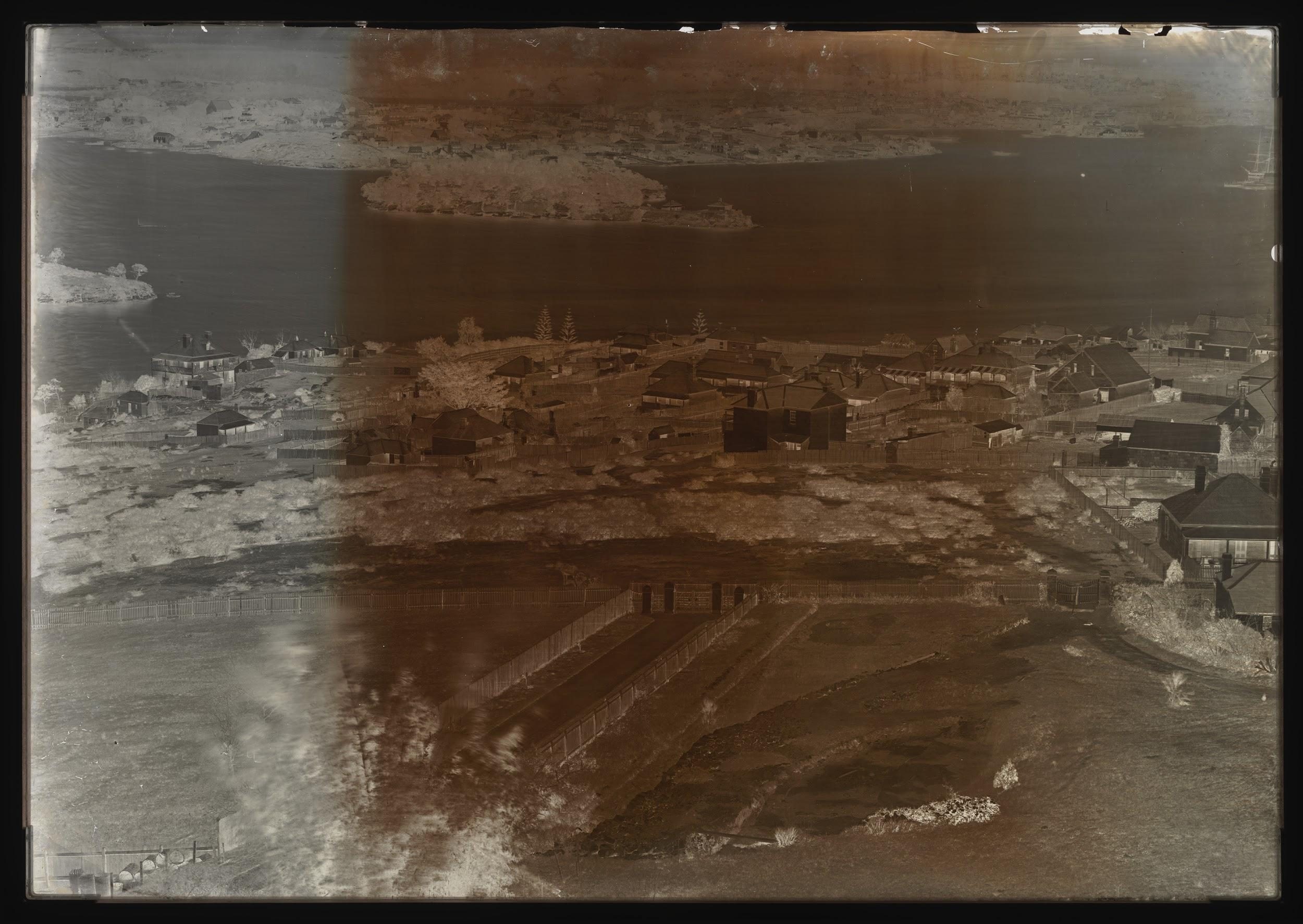
Berrys Bay and Goat Island, Sydney, 1875, Charles Bayliss and Bernhardt Holtermann from negative, 136 x 95 cm (4.4 x 3.1 feet

The largest glass plate negatives produced in the nineteenth century appear to have been made in Sydney, Australia, in 1875, and three are held in the Holtermann Collection, State Library of New South Wales. Intended for display at International Exhibitions they were made by the professional photographer Charles Bayliss with the help of Bernhardt Holtermann who also funded the project. Only four of the colossal glass negatives produced by Bayliss and Holtermann have been identified and all of them were taken from Holtermann's purpose-built camera in the tower of his mansion in North Sydney. Two were 160 x 96.5 cm (5.1 ft x 3.08 ft) and formed a panorama of Sydney Harbour from Garden Island to Millers Point. The other two were 136 x 95 cm (4.4 x 3.1 feet) and were of the Harbour Lavender Bay and Fort Maccquarie and Berry's Bay and Goat Island. All four colossal negatives were acknowledged at the time as being the largest negatives made and appear to have remained so until 1900 when George R. Lawrence built his (4.5 x 8 ft) camera to photograph the Alton Limited locomotive. In 1876 one of the negatives was viewed by the Photographers Art Society of the Pacific Coast (PASPC) who acknowledged it as being the largest negative ever produced. The society declared,

that as photographers we are indebted to the liberality of B. O. Holterman, for demonstrating the possibility and perfecting the production of the largest negative; and we tender him the thanks of this society for kindly placing this negative on view for our benefit.

== The Holtermann Panorama ==
Panorama of Sydney from Lavender Bay, 1875, by Bernard Otto Holtermann and Charles Bayliss

In 1875 Charles Bayliss and Bernhardt Holtermann produced a large panorama of Sydney harbour made from a series of twenty-three wet-plate negatives measuring 56 by 46 centimetres (22 x 18 inches) many of which were duplicated four or more times to obtain the best image. The finished panorama was nearly ten metres (30 feet) long.

It was photographed from the central tower of Holtermann's house in North Sydney. Sitting some 27 metres (90 feet) above a ridge that was already well-elevated the tower gave a special vantage from which to photograph Sydney and the harbour of Port Jackson.

Some of the photographs, including the panorama, were displayed at the Philadelphia Centennial Exhibition, where they won a bronze medal. The panorama was also displayed at the 1878 Exposition Universelle Internationale in Paris.

== Rediscovery ==
Interior, Weir & Embleton's cordial factory, Hill End, 1872, by American & Australasian Photographic Company (details)

In 1951 the negatives were discovered in a garden shed in Chatswood, New South Wales. Credit for the discovery of the photographs goes to Keast Burke and Vyvyan Curnow who worked for the Australasian Photo-Review. While writing a story on the gold nugget discovered by Bernhard Holtermann they found photographs donated by Holtermann at the Mitchell Library. This led Curnow to visit one of Holtermann's descendants who was living in Chatswood, Sydney. Here he discovered some 3,500 glass plate negatives which had been locked for many years in a garden shed. The collection was in remarkably good condition as the plates had remained undisturbed in a safe place out of the light for over seventy-five years. In time, the find proved to be one of the most important to document life on the goldfields of Australia.

== International significance ==
The international significance of the collection is due to its size and quality combined with the level of detail captured in the glass plate negatives. It is a rare survivor of a large-scale nineteenth-century Australian photographic archive. The collection includes three of the largest surviving wet-plate negatives in the world. In May 2013, the Holtermann Collection of glass plate negatives at the State Library of New South Wales was included on the UNESCO Memory of the World Register – Asia and the Pacific. Three giant views of Sydney Harbour, the largest measuring over 1.6 metres (5 feet 3 inches) wide, were added to the UNESCO International Memory of the World Register in November 2017.

== Collection ==
- Collection of 3,500 glass negatives, photographs of goldfield towns in N.S.W. and Victoria; Sydney and Melbourne streets and buildings, 1871-1876.
- PXD 352/vol. 1. Drawings, coloured and uncoloured albumen prints of New South Wales Scenery.
- PXD 352/vol. 2. Uncoloured albumen prints of Victorian Scenery, Bernard O. Holtermann, gold mining scenes Ballarat.
- PXD 352/vol. 3. Albumen prints of Victorian Scenery includes panorama Victorian Sth Yarra etc.
- PXD 352/vol. 4. Coloured and uncoloured albumen prints, silver gelatine prints and photo-mechanical prints of portraits and European scenes.
- MLMSS 968. Bernard Otto Holtermann papers, 1864-1876.
- PXE 1373 and R 2019. 41 albumen prints, 3 medals, 6 Waterhouse stops.

== Digitisation ==
In 2008, the collection was digitised at high resolution and images like this one of On Gay & Co., general storekeepers (grocery & drapery), Hill End were made available through the Library's image viewer. In 2015, Gulgong Holtermann Museum, which uses many of these hi-resolution images, was launched in Gulgong, New South Wales. It officially opened on 26 October 2019.
