= Canadian Lead, New South Wales =

Canadian Lead
- Town
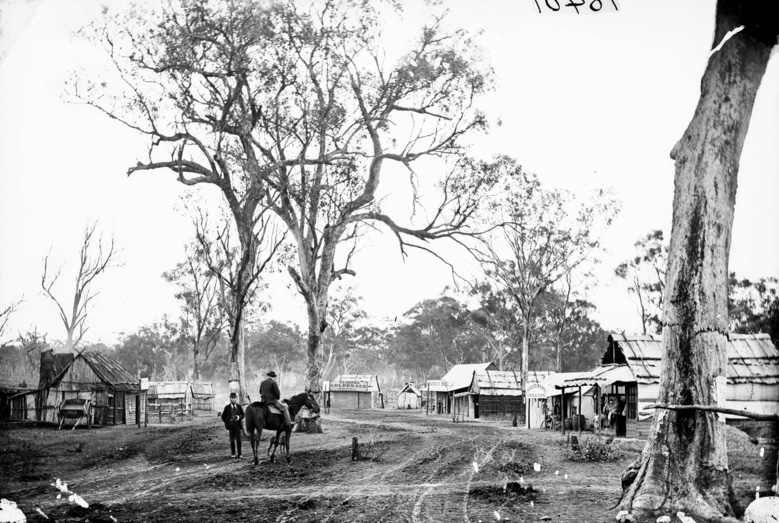
- Canadian Lead, New South Wales, c.1872

- Coordinates: 32°24′20″S 149°33′05″E
- Country: Australia
- State: New South Wales

Population
  - Total: 11 (2016 census)
- Postcode: 2859
Localities around Canadian Lead
Gulgong	Gulgong	Yarrawonga (NSW)
Gulgong	Canadian Lead	Home Rule
Galambine	Wilbetree	Home Rule

Canadian Lead is a 19th-century gold rush town in rural New South Wales, Australia. It is 301 km to Sydney.

In April 1872, The Maitland Mercury and Hunter River General Advertiser reported that "...the Canadian lead, where a month ago some four hundred people were, can now boost of a couple of thousands."
