= Jack Cato =

Australian photographer and photo historian

- Athol Shmith, Jack Cato, circa 1955. National Library of Australia
- Born: John Cyril Cato; 4 April 1889; Launceston, Tasmania, Australia
- Died: 14 August 1971 (aged 85); Melbourne, Victoria, Australia
- Other name: John Cyril Cato
- Occupations: Photographer and author
- Known for: author; The Story of the Camera in Australia
- Spouse: Mary Boote Pearce (24 December 1921 – 1970; deceased)
- Children: Paula Lawrence, John Cato

John Cyril "Jack" Cato, F.R.P.S. (4 April 1889 – 14 August 1971) was an Australian portrait photographer in the pictorialist style, operating in the first half of the twentieth century. He was the author of the first history of Australian photography; The Story of the Camera in Australia (1955)

== Early life ==
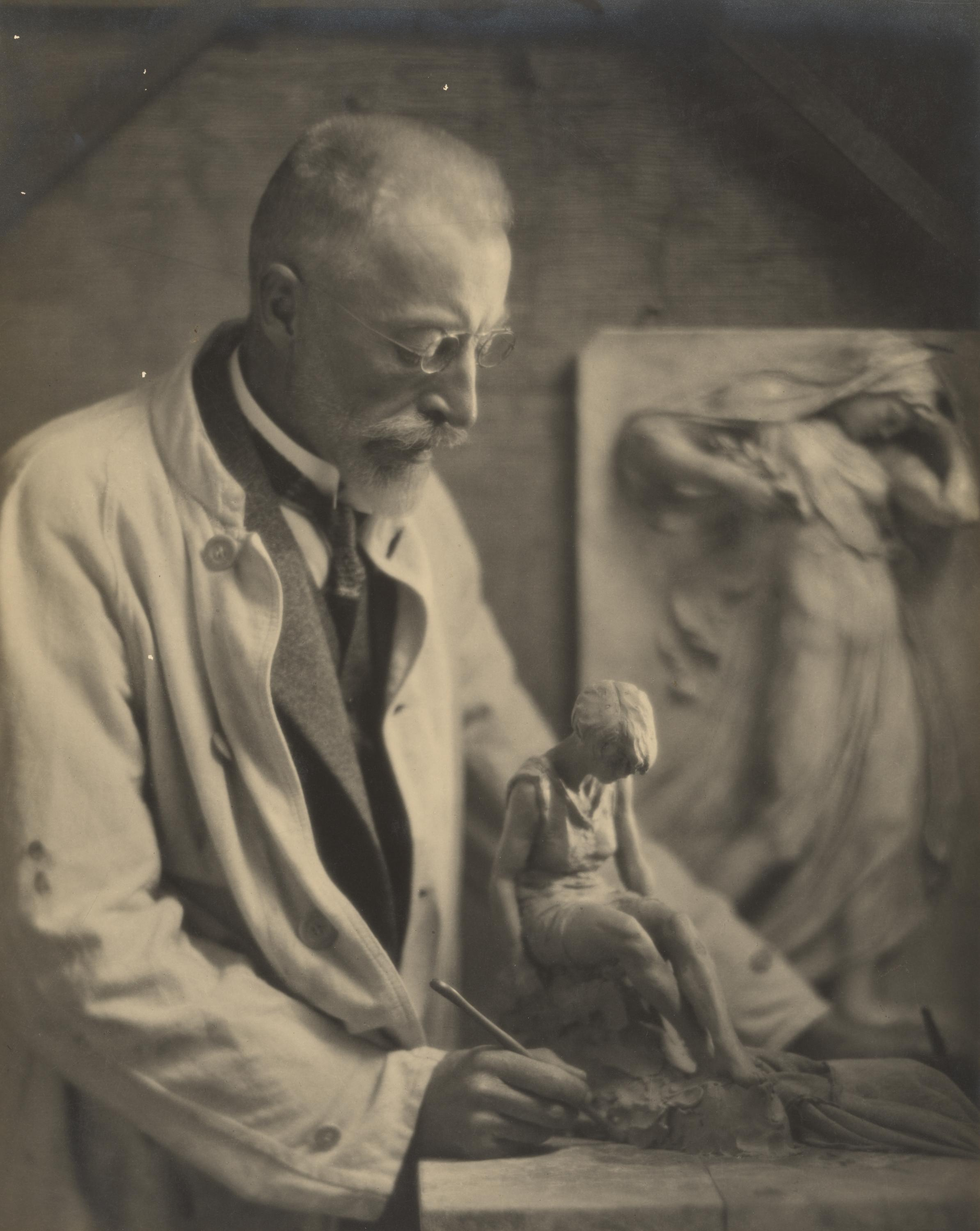
Jack Cato (1924): artist Lucien Dechaineux

Angelo Minghetti, tenor in the Melba-Williamson Grand Opera Company, Melbourne, 1928

John Cyril (Jack) Cato (1889–1971), photographer, was born on 4 April 1889 at Launceston, Tasmania, son of Albert Cox Cato, salesman, and his wife Caroline Louise, née Morgan. At the age of 12 years he did an apprenticeship, and studied arts in night school. His father arranged for him to have lessons from a friend who was a metallurgist at Queenstown, where he learnt the properties of metals in photography. John Watt Beattie, a Scottish landscape photographer and also the son of a photographer, introduced young Jack to the medium in 1896. He was further trained in art by Lucien Dechaineux at Launceston Technical School. From 1901, Cato worked under Percy Whitelaw and John Andrew, both local portrait photographers.

== Career ==
In 1906, aged 17, Cato joined Beattie in his Hobart premises and set up his own studio. Later he applied to be official photographer to (Sir) Douglas Mawson's 1911 Australasian Antarctic Expedition. However, Mawson passed him up, and Henri Mallard, in favour of Frank Hurley. Cato travelled that year in Europe finding work with photographers in London, among them H. Walter Barnett, the fashionable society and vice-regal portraitist, and theatre photographer Claude Harris. Through the latter, and with encouragement from Dame Nellie Melba, he pursued freelance work in the theatrical world. Having contracted tuberculosis and, seeking the relief of a warm climate, Cato left England in 1914 to photograph on the expeditions in Rhodesia of Professor Cory of Grahamstown University. He enlisted for war service in South Africa. The anthropological photography earned him a fellowship (1917) of the Royal Photographic Society of Great Britain.

In 1920, Cato, still convalescing, returned to Tasmania, where he operated his own portrait-studio in Hobart, and there married Mary Boote Pearce (d.1970) on 24 December 1921. He was President of the Tasmanian Photographers' Association in 1923. In 1926 their son John was born and in 1927 they moved to Melbourne. Again with the patronage of Dame Nellie Melba, and through her introductions to society and to theatrical circles, he set up a society portrait studio, first at 244 Collins Street, then permanently in Marcus R. Barlow's (1930) Art Deco Howey House at 259 Collins Street. There, he was conveniently located for clients, close to Melbourne's photographic community and the best department stores and boutiques around Collins Street, Melbourne. He put his pictorialist style, natural gregariousness, love of theatre and technical knowledge to effect in becoming a leader of the trade in Melbourne for two decades.

His society, theatre and advertising photographs were frequently published in magazines and newspapers including The Australian Women's Weekly, The Argus, Table Talk, The Illustrated Tasmanian Mail, The Hobart Mercury, and The Australasian. He maintained links with professional associations and amateur clubs through occasional exhibitions of his best work, and was senior vice-president (1938) and a life member of the Professional Photographers' Association.

== Author ==
Cato retired from his Melbourne studio in 1946 to begin a career as an author In addition to a large number of articles in photographic, philatelic and other magazines, as well as serving as chronicler for the Savage Club, he published an autobiography, I Can Take It (1947), the writing of which he described in an article in the Australasian Photo-Review;

So one night I sat down with a blank sheet of paper and scribbled a precis. It went something like this: —first beginnings with the wet-plate, when we sensitised all our materials from chemicals which we had to prepare ourselves. —coming of the dry-plate—my years as a landscape photographer climbing the mountains, trudging around the lakes and rivers of Tasmania. —my first studio in Hobart. Work in Paris. Excitements in Italy. A year with the camera through Europe. —five years in London. State and theatrical photography under the friendly patronage of Dame Nellie Melba, Covent Garden Opera, Caruso, Pavlova, Bernard Shaw, Marie Corelli, Churchill, etc., etc., etc. —next six years in Africa: hunting, scientific and geographic expeditions in the valley of the Zambesi. —return to Australia – twenty-five years portraiture, pictorial, commercial, architectural, medical – ballet, theatre, royalty, beggars, bishops, prime ministers, weddings, banquets, criminals, generals, corpses, millionaires, nudes, lunatics, models, artists. Faces repaired, ego's [sic] exalted. "Vanitas Vanitatum” Then I secured a lot more paper and began to fill in names and incidents...

Cato’s next book was a pictorial documentary, Melbourne (1949). before he set out on producing a history of his medium.

== The Story of the Camera in Australia ==
Cato's The Story of the Camera in Australia (1955), though it is more populist than academic, is acknowledged as the first Australian national history of the medium, and was premised on his belief that photography "as no other medium, literary or graphic", recorded and would reveal the history of the young nation.

Writing of Cato's work in Walkabout in 1964, Albert Brown, founder of Group M photographers, notes;

That the memory of these early photographers has not been allowed to die is due very largely to Jack Cato, a Melbourne portrait photographer with a talent for journalism. His book, The Story of the Camera in Australia, discloses something of the work and character of such men as Fauchery, Kerry, Lindt, Caire, Merlin, Wagner and others.

A keen stamp-collector from childhood (also 1935 president of the Royal Philatelic Society of Victoria), Cato was able to sell his stamps for about £10,000 in 1954 to finance six years of research for this book. He used the La Trobe Library picture and newspaper collections in Melbourne, making only one visit to Sydney and Canberra institutions. Cato also relied on regular personal correspondence with experts, such as (the 100 or so) letters from Harold Cazneaux, the celebrated pictorialist, and from Keast Burke in Sydney, a photography historian and campaigner for the recognition of photography as a historical resource and who was engaged in 1964 as consultant to the collections at the National Library of Australia.

== Later life ==
From 1960 to 1963, Cato was photography columnist for The Age newspaper in Melbourne. He died on 14 August 1971 at Sandringham, Melbourne, survived by a son, photographer John Cato, and a daughter, Paula Lawrence.

== In collections ==
Collections of Jack Cato's photographs are held by:

- The National Gallery of Australia and
- the National Portrait Gallery, both in Canberra,
- The State Library of Victoria
- National Gallery of Victoria

== Selected exhibitions ==
- 2002 Included in exhibition Just Married, Monash Gallery of Art, Wheelers Hill, 6 September – 20 October 2002.
- 1995 Included posthumously with Athol Shmith, Harold Cazneaux, John Lee, Laurence Le Guay and Max Dupain in National Portrait Gallery curated exhibition High Society: Society Portraiture and Photographs
- 1938 Queen Victoria Museum Art Gallery, Launceston
- 1937 group show of early Kodachromes at Kodak (Australasia), 45 Elizabeth St., Hobart.
- 1936 group show Kodak (A'Asia) Gallery, Collins Street, Melbourne
- 1934 group show Centenary International Exhibition of Professional Photography, Athenaeum Gallery, Melbourne. Awarded Silver Medal in Commercial section.
- 1932 solo show, Athenaeum Gallery
- 1925 solo show of landscapes, The Bookshelf Gallery, Hobart.
- 1923 group show of the Professional Photographers' Association of Tasmania, Hobart.

== Selected bibliography ==
- Cato, J. & Institute of Photography (2009). Charles Nettleton (3rd ed). Institute of Australian Photography, Melbourne
- Cato, J. (1971) Philately from Australia, Sept 1971
- Cato, Jack (1963). Some early Australian Commonwealth postage stamp essays. Review Pubs, Dubbo, N.S.W.
- Cato, Jack (1955). The Story of the Camera in Australia. [With photographs.] Melbourne: Georgian House. OCLC 557556364.
- Cato, Jack (1949). Melbourne. Georgian House, Melbourne
- Cato, Jack (1947). I can take it : the autobiography of a photographer. Georgian House, Melbourne
- Dow, D. M. (1947) Melbourne Savages (Melb)
- Ayrey, Cato, & Cato, Jack. (1950). Australian wildflowers and their arrangement / by Betty Ayrey; colour photography by John Cato for Athol Shmith Studios. Melbourne: Georgian House.
- Cosier, I. (1980) Jack Cato (M.A. prelim thesis, University of Melbourne).
- Ennis, Helen & National Library of Australia & National Portrait Gallery (Australia) (1996). The reflecting eye : portraits of Australian visual artists. National Library of Australia, Canberra.
- Narkiewicz, Ewa (2000). "Jack Cato's Melbourne: an interview with John Cato". In La Trobe Journal. (65), 17–27.
- Newton, G. (1980) Silver and Grey (Sydney)
- Newton, Gael (1993). "Cato, John Cyril (Jack) (1889–1971)". Australian Dictionary of Biography. Vol. 13. National Centre of Biography, Australian National University. ISBN 978-0-522-84459-7. ISSN 1833-7538. OCLC 70677943.
- Newton, G. (1986) "A Story of the Story: Correspondence between Jack Cato and Keast Burke". Photofile, Autumn 1986
- Professional Photography in Australia, 23, no. 5, August–September 1971
- Photofile, 4, no. 1, Autumn 1986
- "The Great Lindt; a compilation based on research by Jack Cato, R. J. Barcham and Keast Burke". (1955-10-01). In Image. 4 (7), 54(1).
- Van Wyk, Susan & Shmith, Michael & Whitfield, Danielle (2006). The Paris End : Photography, Fashion & Glamour. National Gallery of Victoria, Melbourne.
