= Home Rule, New South Wales =

Home Rule
- Town
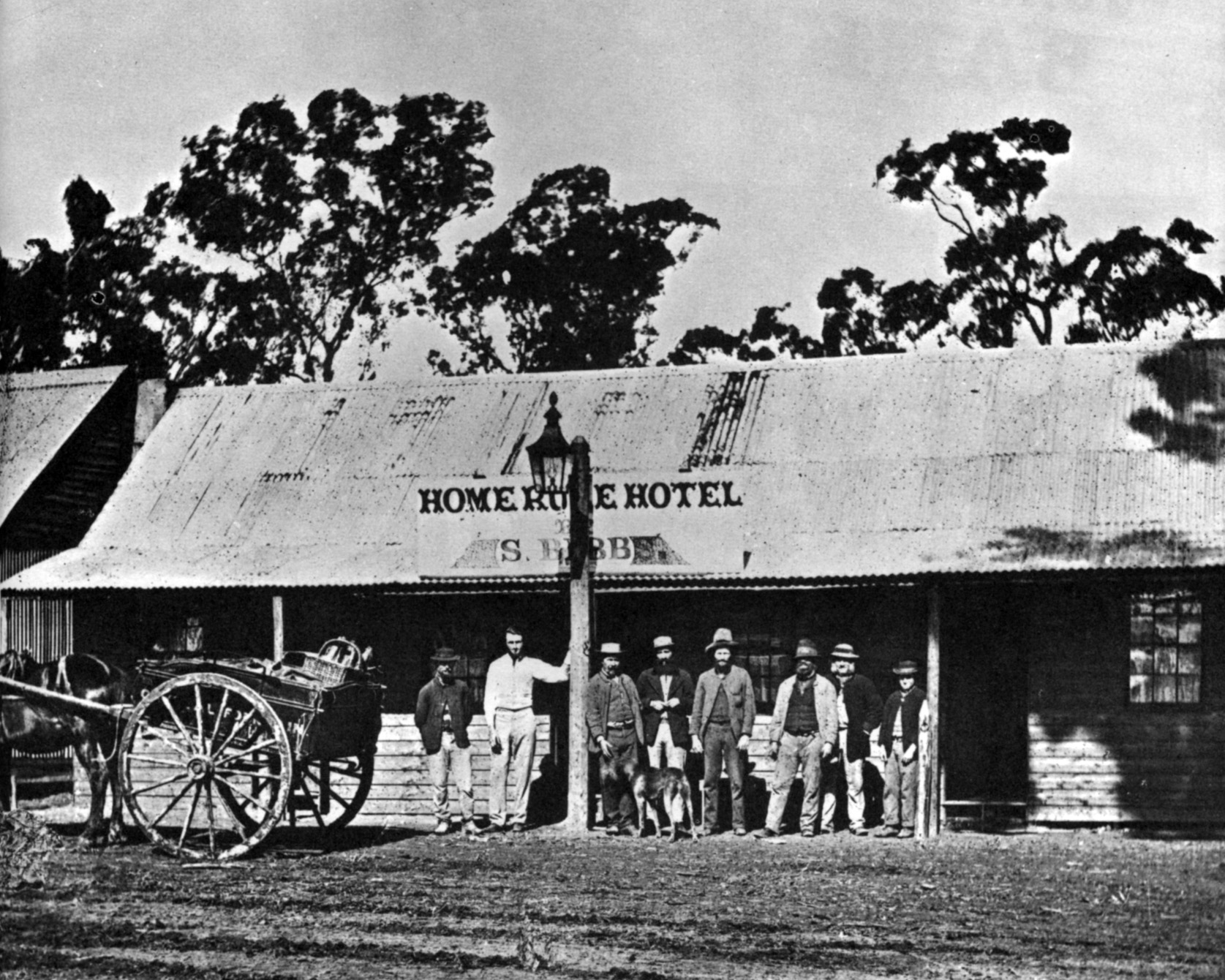
- Home Rule Hotel, c.1872. From the Holtermann Collection

- Interactive map of Home Rule
- Coordinates: 32.4344867°S 149.614146°E
- Country: Australia
- State: New South Wales
- Location: 299 km (186 mi) NW of Sydney; 12 km (7.5 mi) SE of Gulgong; 174 km (108 mi) N of Orange; 30 km (19 mi) N of Mudgee

Population
  - Total: 55 (SAL 2021)
- Postcode: 2850

Home Rule is a locality in the Central West region of New South Wales. Little remains of the 19th-century gold rush era village of the same name, which lies within the locality.

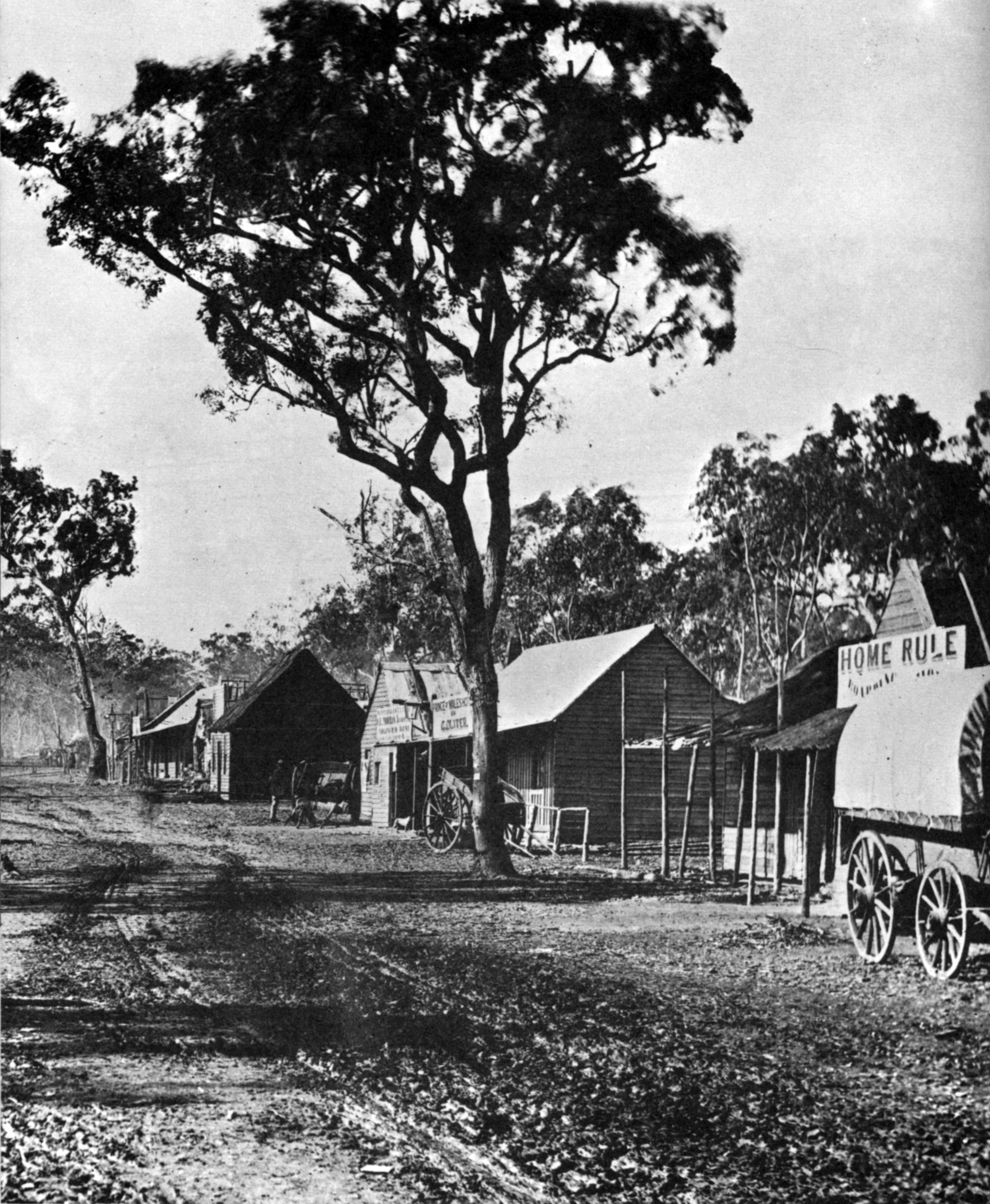
Photograph taken c.1872 of shops at Home Rule. From the Holtermann Collection.

== History ==
The area now known as Home Rule lies on the traditional lands of Wiradjuri people.

Prospectors worked progressively from Gulgong (gold discovered in 1870), through Canadian Lead (gold discovered in 1871), and found gold at Home Rule, in May 1872, in deep lead deposits.

On 9 July 1872 The Maitland Mercury and Hunter River General Advertiser reported that:

"The scene at Home Rule is a busy one, and very few people can form an idea of it unless they go and see for themselves. A township is in rapid formation, and streets are being made close to the golden holes. One digger refused £500 for a share in a claim on the right spot. Everyone appears sanguine. The storekeepers and publicans look remarkably pleasant, as if they anticipated rich harvests, and even John Chinaman smiles graciously on meeting you. It would almost be an impossibility to give an account of the different claims, as they extend for miles; and until the dispute as to the frontage and block system is settled, many men will prefer to be idle."

The mining village at Home Rule came into existence immediately after the discovery of gold there. Home Rule had about 3,000 inhabitants when, on 15 July 1872, Charles Bayliss took a series of photographs of businesses in the village, together with those owners, staff and customers who happened to be there at the time. These glass plate negative photographs form a part of the Holtermann Collection.

Around 1904, there was a revival of deep lead mining in the area.

For many years, the official name of the village was Wyaldra, but it has since reverted to its original and better known name, Home Rule.

There was a public school there, from November 1874 until December 1957. It was first called Home Rule, until December 1874, Mobellah until May 1913, then Wyaldra, before reverting to its original name of Home Rule in December 1913.

== Remnants of the village ==
The names of three streets of the old mining village, Commercial Street, Stanley Street, and Britannia Road are still applied to modern-day roads. The portion of Commercial Street that runs east-to-west corresponds to the old main street of the mining village. Britannia Road running north-to-south corresponds to the original street, where the old school building survives.

There is a water-filled mining pit lying to the east of the eastern end of Commercial Street.
