= Charles Bayliss =

Australian photographer (1850–1897)

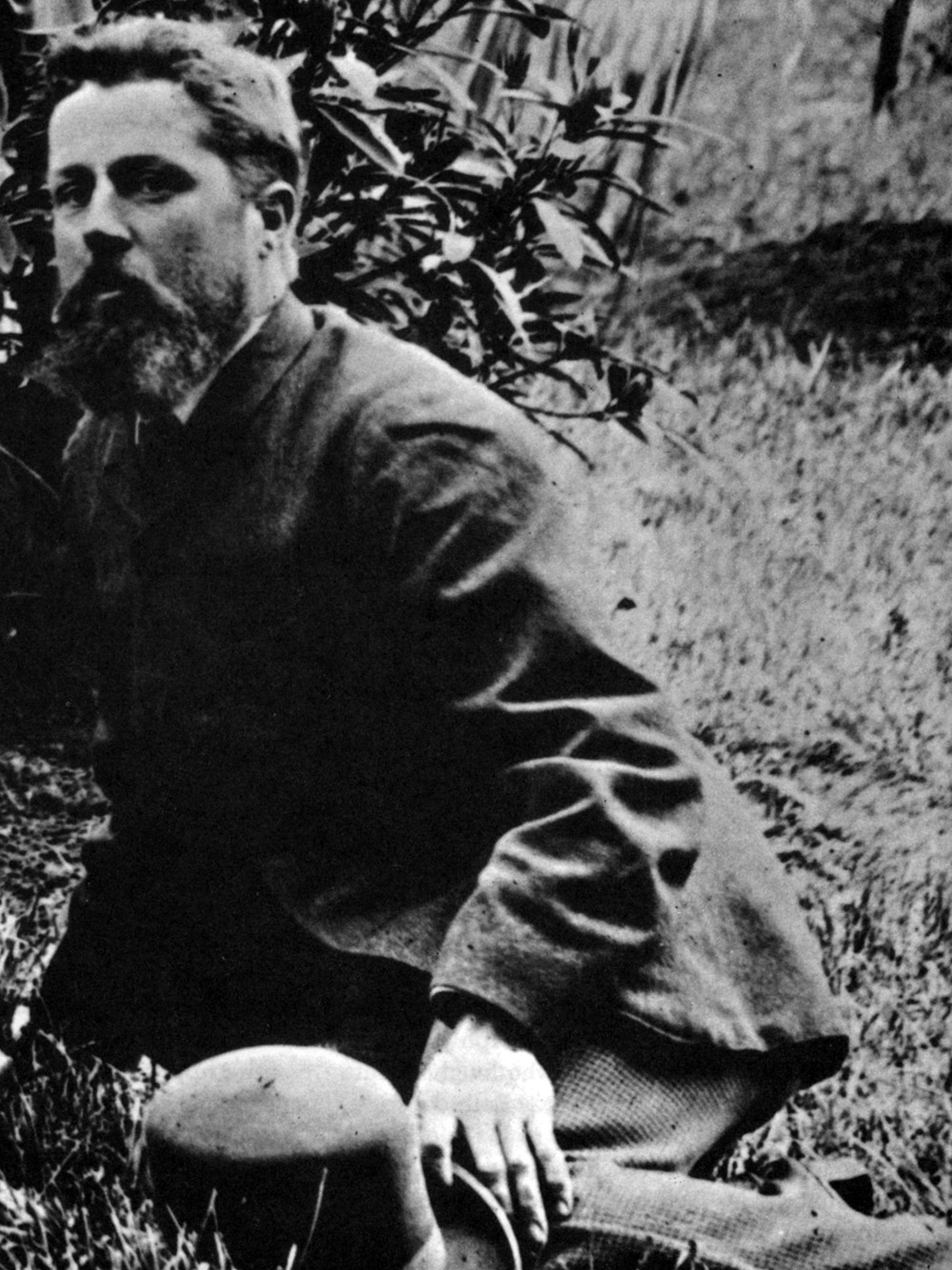
Charles Bayliss, photographer, photographed in Fitzroy Gardens, Melbourne in 1886

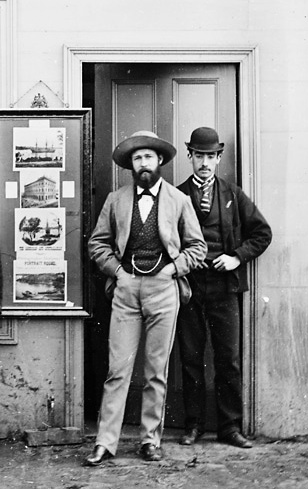
Charles Bayliss (left) and Henshaw Clarke, outside A & A Photographic Company premises, Hill End, New South Wales, 1872.

Charles Bayliss (2 March 1850-4 June 1897), was an Australian photographer, who is best known for photographs that he took during the 1870s, which form a large part of the Holtermann Collection.

== Early life ==
Bayliss was born in Hadleigh, Suffolk, England in 1850. He went to Australia with his parents and they arrived in Melbourne in 1854.

When about sixteen years old Bayliss met the travelling photographer, Beaufoy Merlin, who came to the Bayliss house in suburban Melbourne while photographing houses and families throughout Victoria, with a view to selling the photographs to people along the way. Merlin operated under the name of the American and Australasian Photographic Company (A & A Photographic Company).

== Photographer ==
Bayliss became Merlin's assistant and the pair travelled extensively throughout Victoria and New South Wales. At the goldfields around Hill End, New South Wales, Merlin and Bayliss met Bernhardt Otto Holtermann, who had become wealthy as the result of successful gold mining. Holtermann employed the A & A Photographic Company to produce a series of photographs of the settled areas of Victoria and New South Wales, which could be sent abroad to advertise the colony and encourage migrants. By September 1873 the major part of New South Wales had been completed. However Merlin died at this time.

=== Panorama of Sydney ===
Bayliss, then 23 years old, was contracted to continue the work on the project in both New South Wales and Victoria and, in 1874, Holtermann purchased a mammoth Plate camera for Bayliss and the first images taken with it were of Holtermann's recent purchase of the Post office Hotel in Sydney. Bayliss also completed a panorama of Ballarat using this camera.

In 1875 a panorama of Sydney was completed. This was taken from the tower attached to Holtermann's house in North Sydney, now part of Sydney Church of England Grammar School (Shore). Bayliss was the main photographer, with work also done by Holtermann together with another photographer, Henshaw Clarke.

Up to this time Bayliss was based in Melbourne. Then, in 1876, he and the family moved to Sydney and he established a studio in the city.

== Personal life ==
In 1883 Bayliss had married Christiana Salier. They had seven children together: Raymond Charles (born 1884), Alfred John (1886), Charles (1887—died in infancy), Bessie Salier (1888), Emily Annie (1891), Walter Norman (1893), Eric Edward (1896). Alfred and Walter were both killed in France during World War One.

On 4 June 1897 Charles Bayliss died at his home, "Hadleigh" in Wemyss Street, Marrickville, a suburb of Sydney. He had previously caught a chill which swiftly turned to a "galloping pneumonia." He left a wife and young family, the oldest child being only 13 years old. He is buried at Rookwood Cemetery.

== Legacy ==
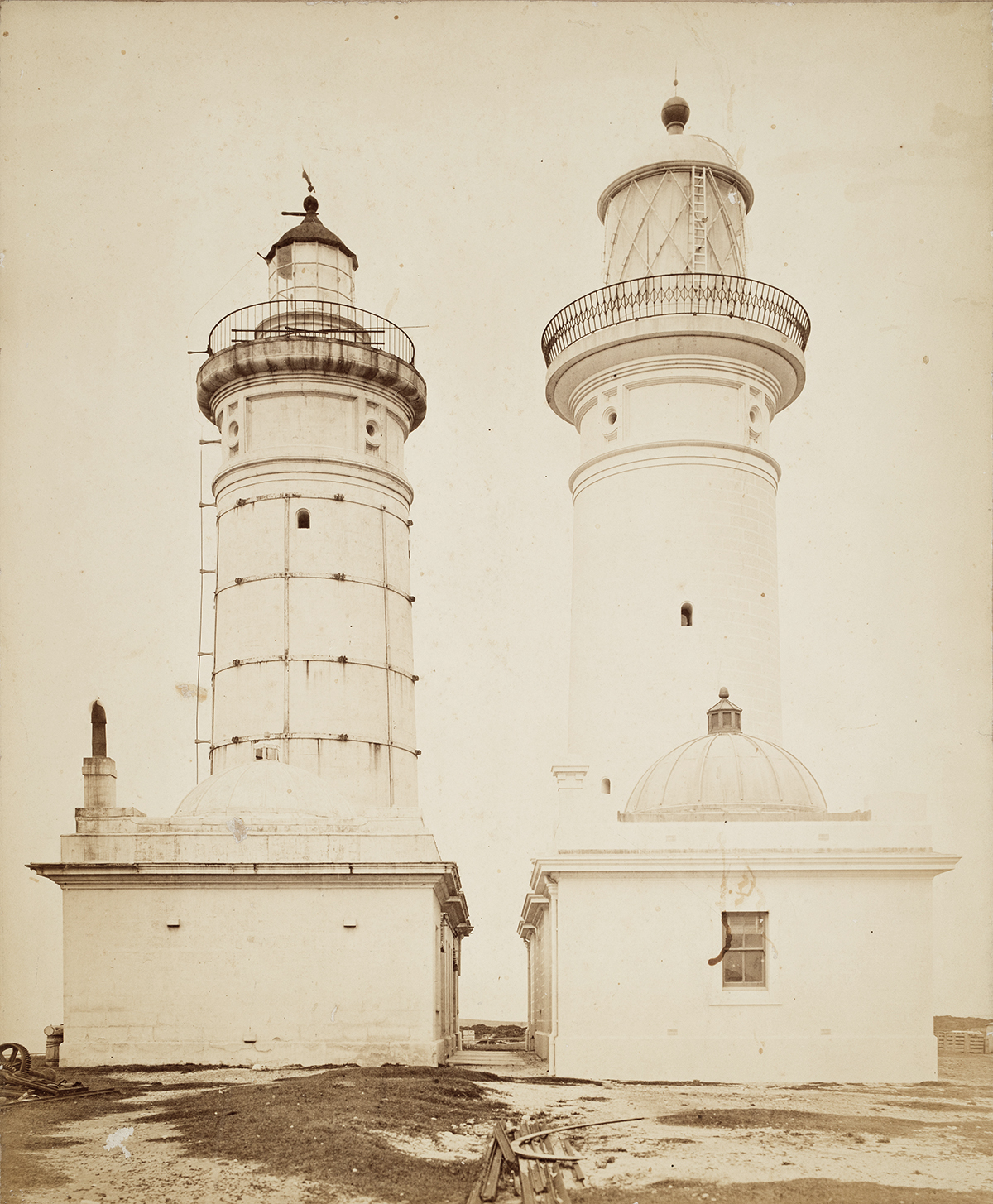
Charles Bayliss (c.1883) The Macquarie Lighthouses – old and new. Macleay Collections

In 1951 approximately 3,500 glass plate photographic negatives were found in the possession of Bernhardt Holtermann's descendants. They were subsequently donated to the Mitchell Library (within the NSW State Library) in Sydney and form the basis of the "Holtermann Collection." In fact, Beaufoy Merlin and Charles Bayliss were the photographers.

On 7 March 1953, Eric Bayliss, a son of Charles Bayliss, wrote a letter to the Sydney Morning Herald regarding his father's work. He quoted from an obituary for Bayliss, which appeared in the Australasian Photo-Review on 19 June 1897, two weeks after the death of Bayliss: "He also took the well-known panorama of Sydney and the harbour from the great dome of the Garden Palace in the Domain and, to get this, performed some astonishing and risky feats of climbing and balancing on the outside of the dome. The picture was taken on a series of 18in x 22in plates and, when completed, formed a panoramic view nearly 20ft in length..."

In the letter to the newspaper, Eric Bayliss himself then went on to note that: "These, as well as all other work by him, were taken on 'wet plate' negatives. He took a vast number of photographs of Sydney, the suburbs, mountains, and country, as far as the Victorian border, as well as groups and portraits. After Beaufoy Merlin's death, Charles Bayliss took over the business and carried on in his own name until his death. Many of the photographs found in the shed on the property owned by Mr. Holtermann were taken by Charles Bayliss." Holtermann and Bayliss together made the largest glass plate negatives produced in the nineteenth century. These were made in Holtermann's tower in 1875, and three are held in the Holtermann Collection at the State Library of New South Wales.

The obituary in the "Australian Photographical Review" (mentioned above) noted that "As a man he was ever genial and kindly; as a landscape photographer he had few equals and no superiors. His memory is forever honoured in the hearts of all who knew him." His memory is also forever honoured in the "Holtermann Collection," the most important photographic documentation of goldfields life in Australia and an enduring record of life in Australia in the late 19th century.
