= Henry Beaufoy Merlin =

Australian artist (1830–1873)

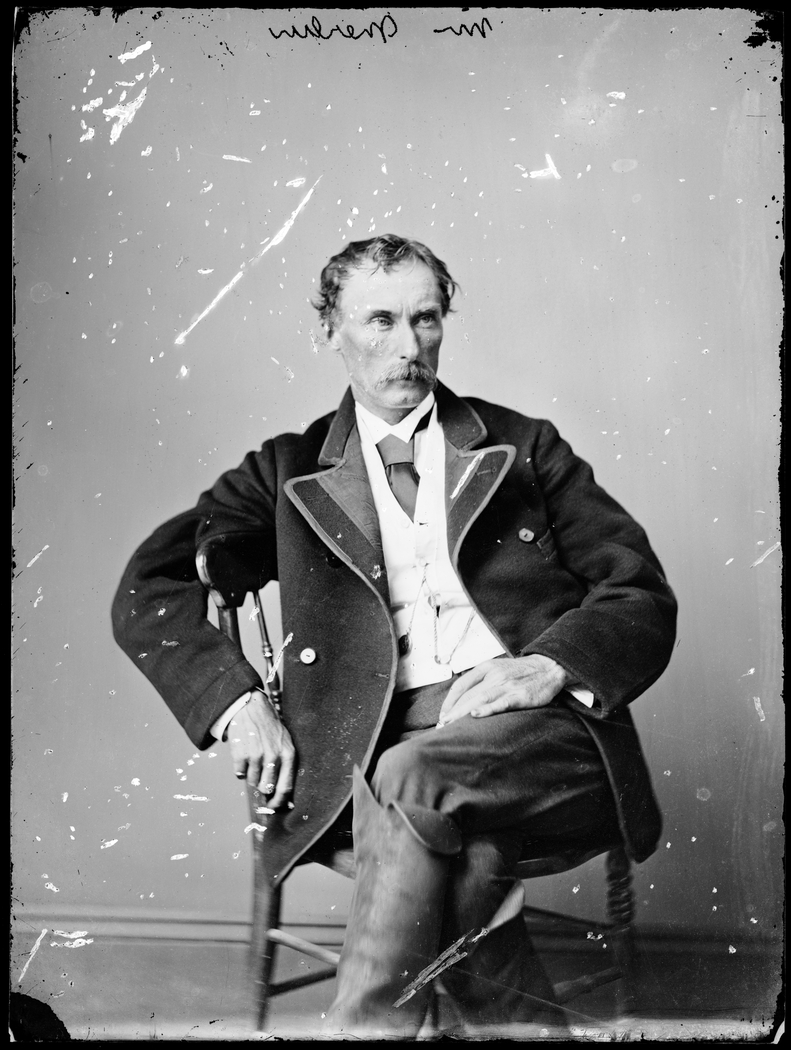
- Portrait of Henry Beaufoy Merlin, 1872–1873, attributed to the American and Australian Photographic Company, State Library of New South Wales, ON 4 Box 30 No 68
- Born: Henry Beaufoy Merlin; Baptised 29 March 1830; Norfolk, England
- Died: 27 September 1873; Leichhardt, New South Wales
- Occupations: Theatrical entrepreneur, illustrator, photographer
- Years active: 1851–1873
- Known for: American and Australasian Photographic Company, Gold Rush and Holtermann Exposition photographs

Henry Beaufoy Merlin (1830–1873) was an Australian photographer, showman, illusionist and illustrator. In the 1850s he worked as a theatrical showman and performer in Sydney, Newcastle and Maitland. In 1863, he was the first person to introduce Pepper's ghost to Australia. After this, he took up photography and between 1869 and 1872 turned the American Australasian Photographic Company into one of the most respected studios in Australia. Between 1872 and 1873, he worked extensively documenting the goldfields and mining towns of New South Wales. In 1873, as an employee of Bernhardt Holtermann, he photographed Sydney and many rural New South Wales towns. He died on 27 September 1873.

== Early life ==
Merlin was born in Norfolk, England, the son of a chemist, Frederick Merlin, and his wife, Ann Harriet (nee Beaufoy). He was baptised in Wells-next-the-Sea in March 1830. Merlin and his mother arrived in Sydney from London on 8 December 1848.

In 1851, Ann Harriet married Henry John Forster. The Sydney Morning Herald records that the bride's name was Anne Harriett Murlin, daughter of Benjamin Beaufoy. After his mother's marriage to Foster, Merlin took to using a number of different names before finally settling on Beaufoy Merlin, leading to some confusion around his early history.

== Theatrical showman ==
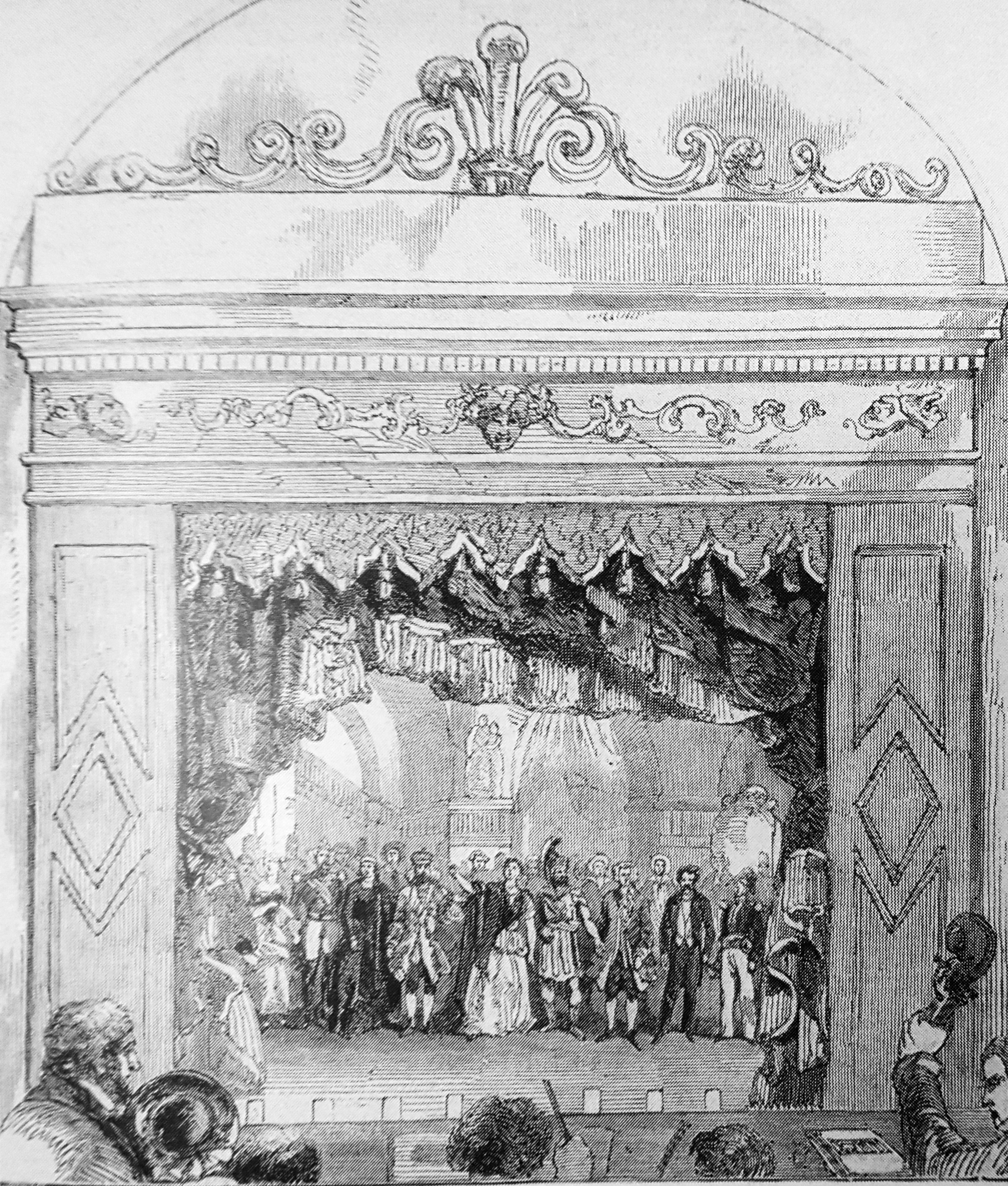
The Royal Marionette Theatre, Illustrated London News, 17 January 1852

In May 1853, Henry Murlin took out a licence to establish a Marionette theatre, 'executed with mechanical figures.' Merlin opened in the old Olympic Circus building in Castlereagh Street and a month later went on the road with the 'burlesque theatre' holding a number of shows, including a performance of Bombastes Furioso by William Rhodes.

By 1855, Merlin had set up an amateur theatre in Maitland where he started referring to himself as Henry B. Muriel. Around the middle of 1856, Merlin opened a 'beautiful little' theatre in High Street named the 'Queen's Theatre' which accommodated 300 people. The Following year, after the Maitland theatre burned to the ground, he moved to Newcastle, where he worked as a manager, actor and painter of scenery for 'The Newcastle Theatre.'

After a few shows, Merlin left Newcastle and, in May 1857, he applied for a license to exhibit panoramas in Sydney. A year later, he was still in Sydney, and in June 1858, he opened a new exhibition at the Lyceum Theatre, Sydney.

Merlin's Indian panorama, painted by himself and a Mr. Guy, seems to have involved a series of scrolling panoramic scenes and projections over which a narrator would recount tales, offer scientific snippets, sing songs and offer humorous vignettes. Within a few weeks of its, opening Merlin added a new scene to the production titled The Storming of Delhi, from the Cashmere [sic.] Gate, presumably highlighting events from the Indian rebellion the year before. At the end of November 1858 Merlin sold the 'Indian Panorama'.

While details of Merlin's general movements are sketchy, over the next few years by 1863, he was back in England. In January, Henry Beaufoy Merlin married Louisa Eleanor Foster at the church of St Mary in Bow, Middlesex, and it was under this name that he and Louisa moved back to Australia. By July Merlin was settled in Melbourne where he embarked on a new theatrical enterprise which projected a spectral illusion onto a stage.

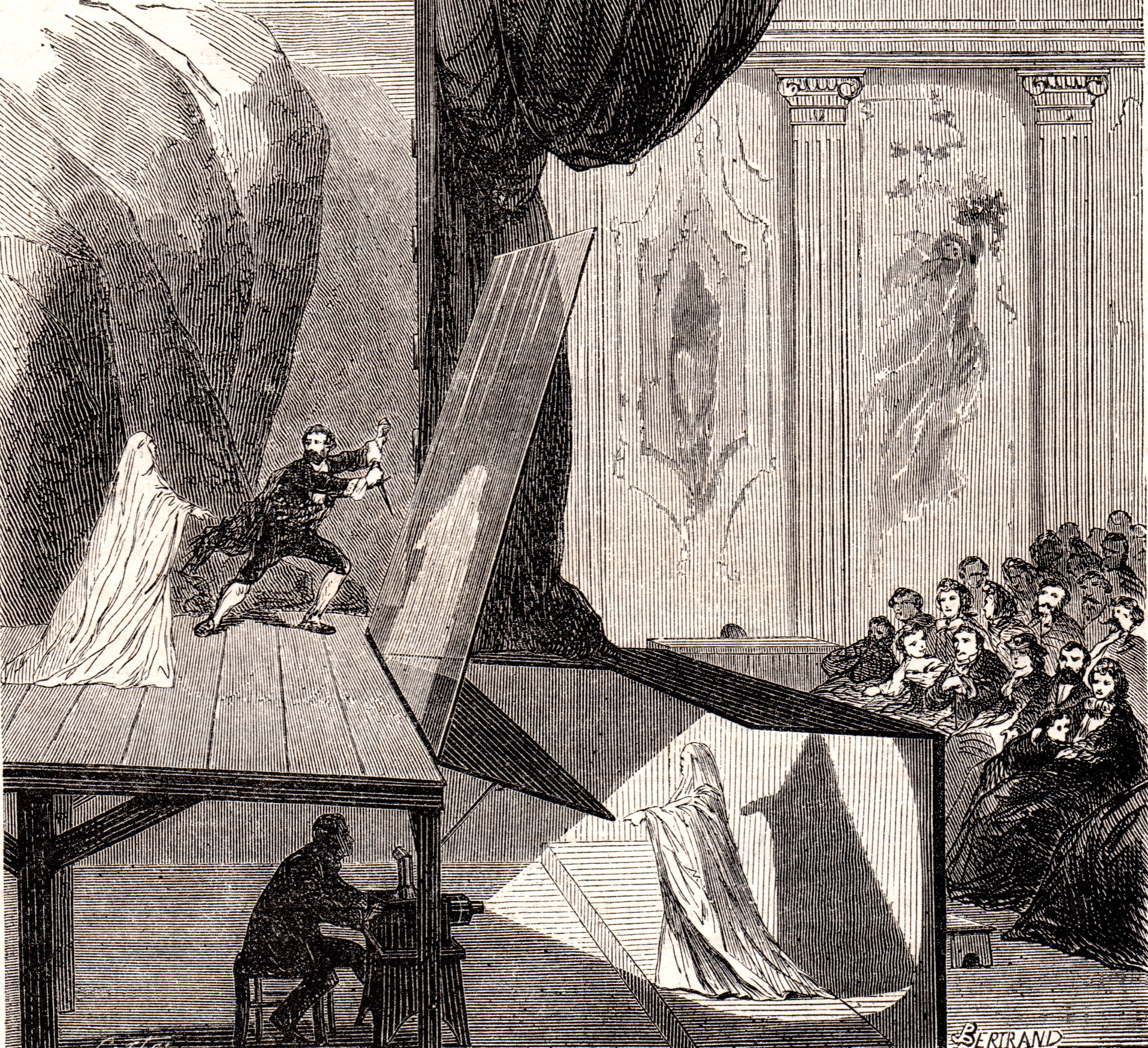
Pepper's Ghost stage set up, 1862, Le Monde Illustré

This spectral illusion, popularly known as Pepper's ghost, used a series of angled sheets of glass to project a ghost onto the stage alongside the actors. A provisional patent had been lodged in England by John Henry Pepper and Henry Dircks in February 1863, and this may have been why it was possible for Merlin to lodge one here in Australia.

Merlin's consortium was the first to successfully perform the trick for the theatre here in Australia and the first play they chose was a popular drama entitled The Castle Spectre. It was well received according to contemporary accounts.

In late September, he was presenting 'The Ghost' in Castlemaine, Victoria, but with no theatrical accompaniment. Instead, the illusion was presented by Merlin himself as part of a lecture on spiritualism. When a presentation of 'The Ghost' arrived at the Victoria Theatre in Adelaide in October 1863, it was Woollaston and a Mr. Solomon who were being credited as the main instigators.

== Photographer 1865–1872 ==
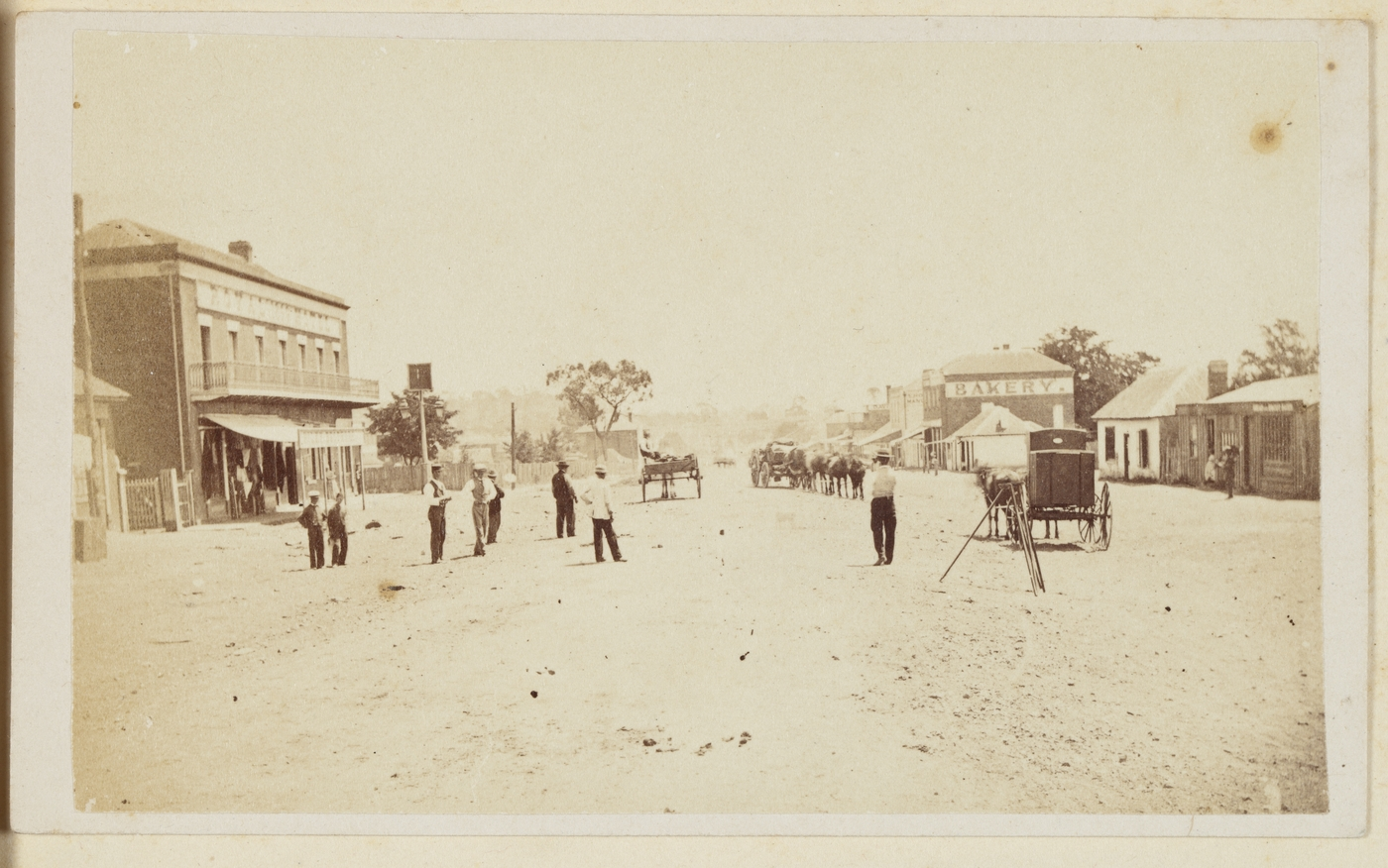
Street scene, rural New South Wales, 1870–1972, American and Australasian Photographic Company

On 21 January 1865, H. Merlin opened the 'Kyneton Photographic Studio' in Piper Street, Kyneton, a small town in northern Victoria. The studio was completed at considerable expense and advertised instantaneous portraits, landscape and stereoscopic views, enlargements from carte de visites in crayon and in oil, as well as an operating room, 'constructed on the principle recently designed by Mr Matheson of the Crystal Palace, and until the present occasion, never introduced to this colony.

Importantly, Merlin was already advertising his services to take photographs of public buildings and private residences, 'at moderate terms and on the shortest notice', as this would become one of the features of the American and Australasian Photographic Company. However, it seems Merlin had dangerously extended his credit to set up the studio and without enough customers, was, by May 1865, filing for insolvency. In particular, he pointed out how 'he had been deprived by the owner of the use of certain necessary implements he had on hire for the purpose of carrying on his business.'

By December 1865, the insolvency proceedings had been resolved and, with no more creditors, Merlin appears to have moved to Ballarat where his mother, now a widow, was also living. Included in a description of the Ballarat District Exhibition for 1866, photographs by Roberts and Merlin of Ballarat are mentioned alongside Mrs Forster's wax flowers and fruits, which were described as being, 'so beautiful that it is difficult to wish for anything better.'

By February 1869, his contemporaries were touting him as a successful travelling landscape photographer, and he was working on an album of landscapes for His Excellency the Governor of Victoria as well as taking photographs for the Prince of Wales who was to visit Sydney in the same year.

In June 1869, he was at Emerald Hill giving a 'highly-interesting and instructive lecture, The Pilgrim's Progress, illustrated with beautiful dissolving views.' His experiences over this period must have convinced him that there was money to be made taking landscape and architectural views, but the failure of his studio in Kyneton and his prior experience as a travelling showman seem to have encouraged him to set up a different kind of photographic business. On 21 June 1869, he formed the American and Australasian [sometimes recorded as Australian] Photographic Company (AAPC).

A company called the American and Australian Photographic Company has been formed, for the purpose of carrying out photographic operations on an extensive scale. The company have an office in the city, but the headquarters of the landscape department is at Emerald Hill. The company commenced business on Monday.

Initially, the office in Melbourne was located at 73 Little Collins Street but it seems Merlin opened a second office at 4 Barrack Street, Sydney, in September 1869. Although the AAPC offices were located in the city, much of the business was being done in rural areas. The AAPC business model adopted a new methodology to increase efficiency and mitigate the costs of travelling to country towns. And this seems in part shaped by the many years Merlin had spent promoting his theatrical events.

Firstly, advertisements in local papers would alert the residents that a representative of the company would be arriving. Once there, the photographer would take a photograph of every house and building. The negatives would then be sent back to head office where they could be stored. As orders came in, either through the AAPC photographer or AACP representatives in the town, prints were made and sent to the purchaser.

This approach appears to have been set in place almost from the inception of the company. In September 1869, the company arrived in Beechworth, where advertisements in the Ovens and Murray Advertiser stated the town's residences would be photographed.

As the year drew to a close, Merlin still appears to have been handling the bulk of the photography work. The AAPC advertisements from this period also make it clear he was making his way towards Sydney through Emerald Hill (June), Beechworth (September), Shepparton (October) and Wangaratta (November). In December, he was at the El Dorado Goldfields, where he photographed the turning of the sod for the Devon Company's first mine shaft.

By February 1870, he was in New South Wales, visiting Yass, where he made good on his advertised promises to photograph every house. Not only were the pictures done rapidly, but they were also done with more than usual excellence. Although the photographs were for sale at the time they were taken, the company representatives did not press their sale while on location. Instead, the negatives were stored at the head offices in Melbourne and Sydney, and prints were put on display there. From here, they could be ordered as required. Agents were also employed by the company to sell photographs on commission.

== The Australian Eclipse Expedition 1871 ==
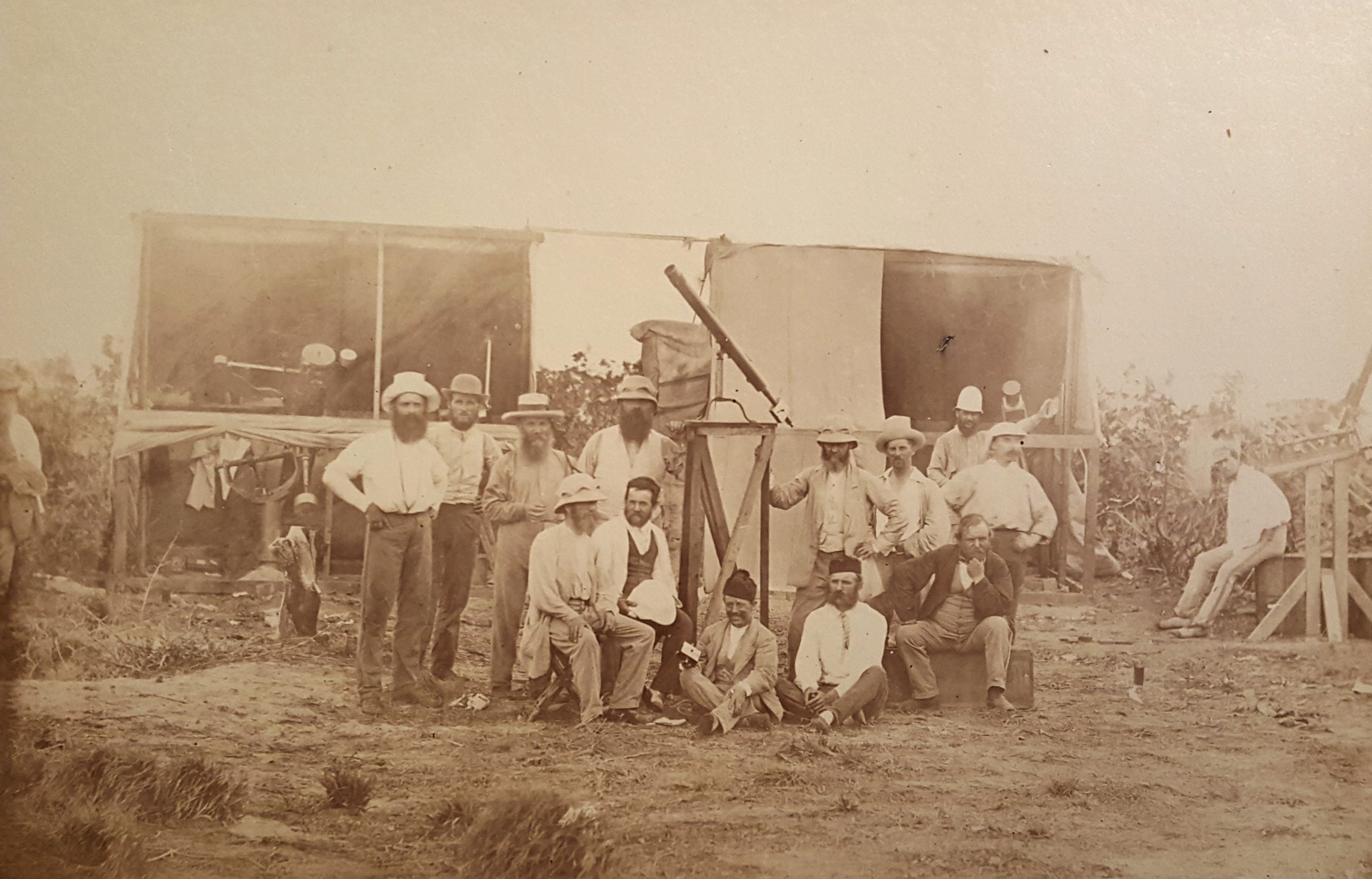
Astronomers, Australian Eclipse Expedition, 1871, attributed to Beaufoy Merlin

In October, Merlin left Sydney to take photographs of Wollongong and Kiama, leaving Charles Bayliss in charge of the 'supervision of the Landscape Department' and attending to all orders, weather permitting. This arrangement may have been a way to shore up the company before Merlin's final adventure for 1871. On 27 November, Merlin left Sydney on the steamship Governor Blackall as part of the Australian Solar Eclipse Expedition bound for North Queensland. Accompanying him on board were a 'who's who' of Australia's natural historians and scientists, all of whom were travelling to Cape Sidmouth to view the solar eclipse on 12 December. Unfortunately, after they had set up their instruments on Eclipse Island, the day proved too overcast and, even though he continued to expose the plates, Merlin described their trip to have been in vain.

On the return journey, Merlin experimented with taking a series of coastline views of the Whitsunday Passage and succeeded in recording a considerable portion of it. These, he thought, would prove useful to the mariner as they reproduced the 'elevations, depressions, projections, &c, with an accuracy impossible in hand-drawings.' Merlin arrived back in Sydney on Christmas Eve, 'in time to hear the joyous Christmas bells ring out.'

== Gold rush photographs ==
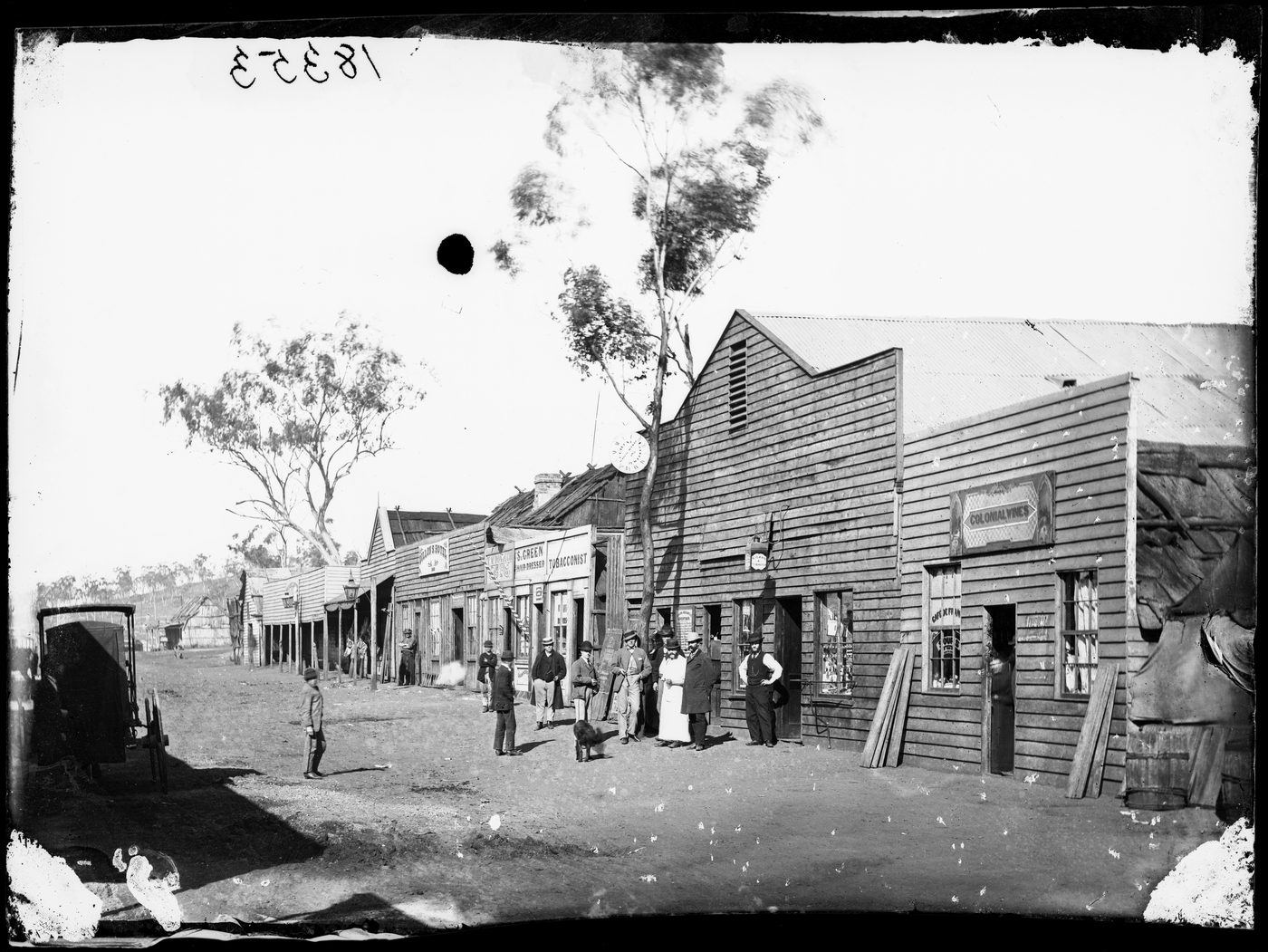
Mayne Street, Gulgong, 1872–1973, [attributed to] Henry Beaufoy Merlin

Beaufoy Merlin's photographic cart c. 1873

The new year initially seemed to be business as usual for the AAPC, with operators at work in Wagga Wagga and Gympie. But on 5 February, he announced he was retiring from management of the New South Wales branch of the Company. He was replaced by Mr. Carlisle, who continued to use the photographic staff from the company.

He then packed up his camera and equipment and headed off to the newly discovered goldfields at Hill End, Tambaroora and Gulgong near Bathurst, New South Wales. This arrangement does not mean Merlin left the company; in fact, he continued to supply Carlisle with negatives of Hill End to print.

Merlin's photographs of shops, hotels, theatres, mines and batteries were supplemented by more traditional portraits of the townsfolk taken in the AAPC studio set up in Tambaroora and the temporary one set up at Hill End. The earlier work of the AACP photographers, including Merlin, had focused on landscape views. While these sometimes-included people in the streets and outside their houses, this feature became even more obvious in Merlin's goldfield photos. Here people seem to have been actively encouraged to pose in front of their cottage, mine or shop and, thus, most of these 1872 views include owners, families and managers posed in front of their buildings.

Contemporary newspapers cite Merlin as the photographer responsible for the 1872 landscape views taken on the New South Wales goldfields and these photographs remain his most lasting legacy. By 4 May, he had spent time at both Hill End and Tambaroora and had taken over 100 views, some of which made their way to the Metropolitan Intercolonial Exhibition in Sydney. Less than a week later the Evening News was effusive in its praise of Merlin's images of Hawkins Hill and twenty large views, one dozen lesser views, and sixty smaller photographs of every scene of interest as well as the principle machinery at work. The whole series made up a valuable portrayal of the extensive mining operations at the locations. The Evening News also made it clear how unique Merlin's enterprise was,

these splendid photographs, will, we hope, reimburse the spirited artist for the great difficulties undergone and expense he incurred is carrying out his object in so mountainous and broken a country. So far as we are aware nothing of the like nature has ever before been successfully accomplished in similar circumstances.

While many of the shots were taken of the buildings and streets, others were taken in the goldfields themselves and required a great deal more effort. One of these, depicting the mines at Hawkins Hill, was reproduced in the Town and Country Journal on 18 May 1872, where the journalist, possibly Merlin himself, describes how the photograph was only possible after erecting a series of stages in the highest trees above the thousand-foot-deep gully. The camera and photographer then climbed up to the stage to photograph the mines nearly two miles away on the other side of the gully.

== Holtermann Exposition ==
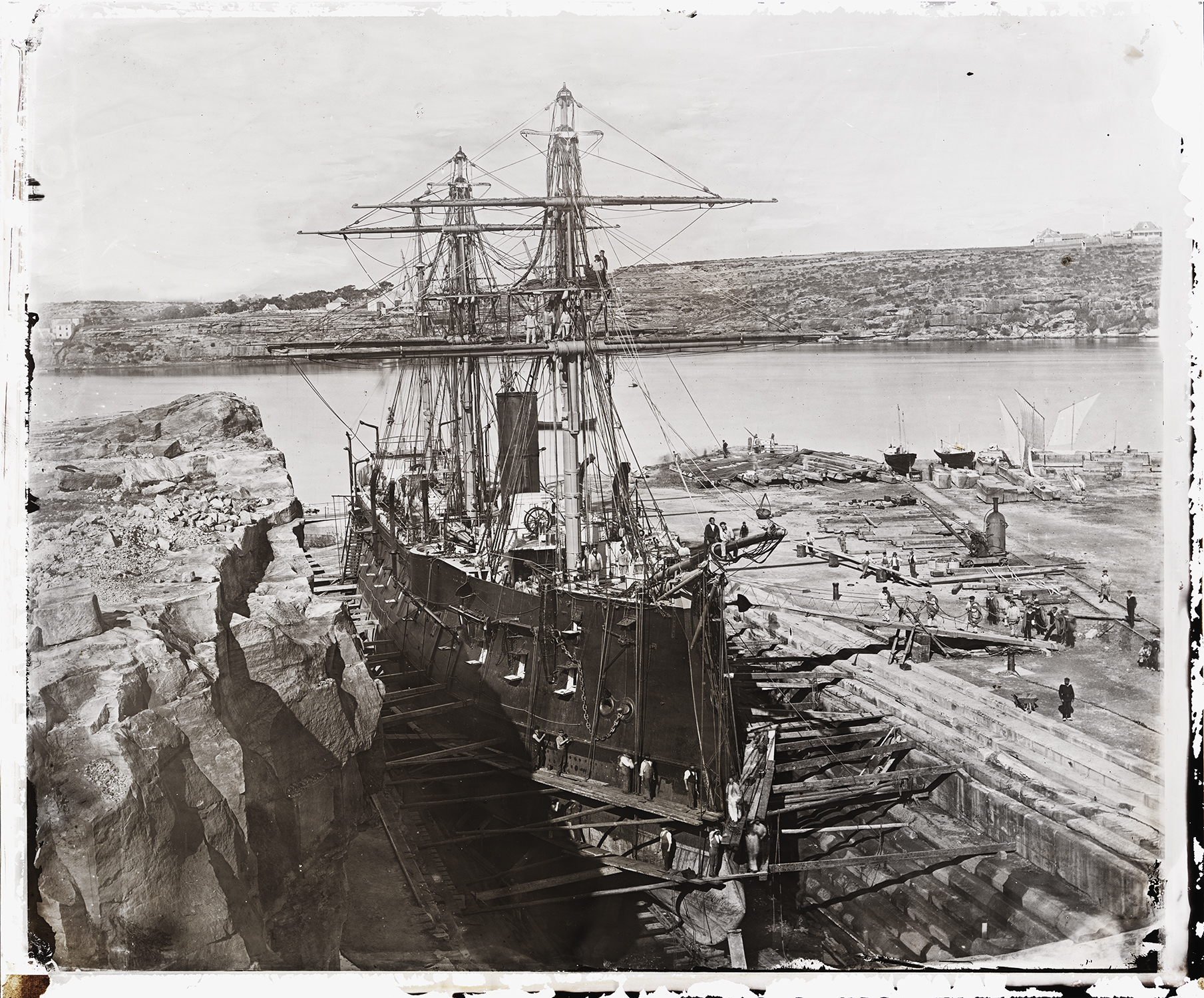
Atalante in the Fitzroy Dock, Sydney Harbour, 1873, by Beaufoy Merlin

By 1872, The Star of Hope Gold Mining Company was mining one of the richest veins of gold in Hawkins Hill, and this had made its manager, Bernard Holtermann, very wealthy. Merlin and Holtermann's relationship came to the fore when the largest piece of reef-gold in the world was discovered in the Star of Hope mine on 19 October 1872. Holtermann approached Merlin, who photographed it before it was sent to the crusher and took several photographs of Holtermann and his partner Beyer. Then on 30 October, Merlin wrote a long biographical article praising Holtermann's hard work and persistence, which had kept the mine running in the years before they struck gold. In November, he photographed the cakes of pure gold made from crushing the huge piece of reef gold.

By the end of December, Holtermann had left the Hill End to set himself up in his new home on the North Shore of Sydney. It was also around this time that Merlin seems to have inspired Holtermann to start a new project. On 1 January 1873, a number of advertisements appeared in papers across the country describing Holtermann's new and ambitious scheme to promote Australia's industrial resources and to seek submissions from interested parties before the proposed opening in eight months time.

Holtermann engaged Merlin to take panoramas and views of all the towns and gold-fields in the colonies, which would then be used to create albums of each town and gold-field, containing statistical information and other valuable matter. These photographs were to be presented as large transparent pictures using a new process invented by Merlin. As the year progressed, Holtermann continued to support Merlin in his photographic endeavours. In March, the Governor of New South Wales, Hercules Robinson, visited Hill End and Merlin captured the banners strung across the street to welcome him.

In April, Merlin was in Bathurst photographing the town for Holtermann. And, on 5 July, the Town and Country Journal posted an article by the 'Photographic Artist of Holtermann's Exhibition,' presumably Merlin, which extolled the beauty of the countryside, and the described the 102 main buildings in the town as well as the character of its inhabitants. By the end of July, he was back in Sydney, taking more photographs for the exhibition and working on a series of large three-foot transparent photographs, hundreds of which were intended for Holtermann's Exposition. The positive transparencies were created by enlarging his original negatives, and their size was noted by those who saw the early examples produced by Merlin.

One reason for the coverage in the news may have been due to a deputation of the New South Wales Commissioners for the International Exhibition, who were meeting with the Colonial Secretary to discuss setting up a permanent exhibition building in London. This proposal fell through, even though it was potentially a good fit for Holtermann's Exposition collection. Being of German origin, Holtermann may have been looking to display at the Vienna Exhibition, but when this opened in September 1873, there were no displays from New South Wales. Regardless of these setbacks, Merlin worked with his normal diligence, preparing his collections for the Exposition without knowing when they would finally open. His primary focus continued to be the work for Holtermann but he also found time to write journalistic articles for the papers. In August 1873, he produced a series of articles on the recent discoveries made by the expedition of HMS Basilisk to New Guinea.

At the same time, he continued with his photographic work and his image of the French warship Atalante at Fitzroy Dock on Cockatoo Island, Sydney, is one Merlin himself acknowledged as among his best works. Soon after this, Merlin left Sydney to photograph the townships of Orange and Dubbo. His account of this journey, which appeared in the Town and Country Journal, praised the people and the climate and reads almost like a caption for one of the proposed albums of views for Holtermann's Exposition.

== Death ==
On 27 September 1873, Merlin died after a very short illness at his home in Little Abercrombie Street, Leichhardt, Sydney. The cause was an 'inflammation of the lungs supervening upon the epidemic (a kind of influenza) which has lately been so general in Sydney.'

The Evening News, which recorded his death, also gave an insight into the character of this highly motivated and successful man:

Mr. Merlin had won the esteem of a wide circle of friends by his kindness of heart, and singularly unpretentious, straight-forward, and genial character. Energetic, temperate, and active to a remarkable degree, his unexpected decease [sic.] will surprise as well as grieve all to whom he was known. As a photographic artist, he was almost without rival, while his talents as a writer were of a superior kind, although the want of leisure greatly interfered with his literary tastes.

== Legacy ==
Whilst Merlin was well known as a photographer at the time of his death, it was not until 1951 that the extent of his photographic achievement, and that of his assistant, Charles Bayliss, was realised with the discovery of approximately 3,000 glass photographic negatives neatly packed in cedar and metal boxes. The find was subsequently titled the Holtermann collection in honour of Bernhardt Holtermann, who had financed the enterprise of photographing.

After Merlin's death, his wife and children returned to England. Merlin's mother found herself in financial distress following his death, and funds were collected to assist her.

Merlin's lasting legacy is the Holtermann Collection. As Keast Burke put it, "Australia must forever owe a deep debt of gratitude to Beaufoy Merlin, for his photography proved to be the true historian of that time and place—incomparable, authentic[,] unchallengeable." In 2013, the Holtermann collection of photographs was listed on the UNESCO Memory of the World Programme.
