= John William Lindt =

German-Australian photographer

- Johannes Wilhelm Lindt
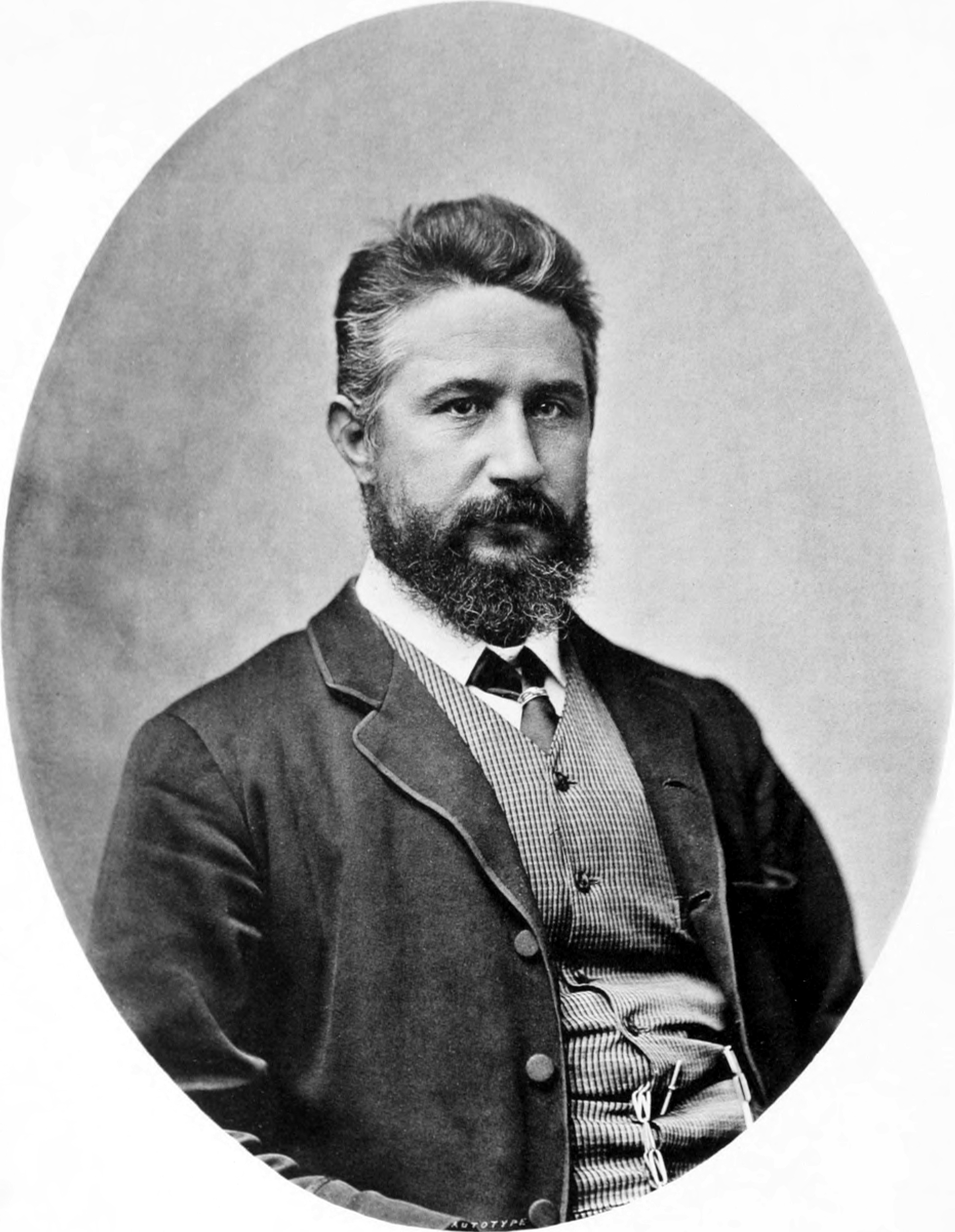
- J. W. Lindt, FRGS, from Picturesque New Guinea, Plate II
- Born: 1845; Frankfurt-am-Main, Germany
- Died: 1926 (aged 80–81); Black Spur, Victoria
- Occupation: Photographer
- Spouses: Anna Wagner (m. 1872; died 1888) Catherine Elizabeth Cousens (m. 1889)
- Children: 2
- Writing career
- Years active: 1869-1925
- Notable awards: FRGS

John William Lindt FRGS (1845–1926), was a German-born Australian landscape and ethnographic photographer, early photojournalist, and portraitist.

== Early life and arrival in Australia ==
Johannes Wilhelm Lindt (often referred to in the literature simply as J.W. Lindt, and his name anglicised in Australia as 'John William') was born at Frankfurt-am-Main, Germany, son of Peter Joseph Lindt, a customs officer, and his wife Justine, née Rambach.

At 17 he took a working passage to Australia on a Dutch sailing ship which he left at Port Melbourne (Frost and Boddington, basing their accounts on Cato, incorrectly have him disembarking—even 'deserting'—his ship at Brisbane). Taking up work as an itinerant piano-tuner, he traveled amongst towns in Victoria and New South Wales before settling in Grafton in 1863 where he became assistant and apprentice to photographer Conrad Wagner (c.1818- 1910).

== Photographer ==
After a brief return to Germany in 1867 Lindt took over management of Wagner's studio in 1869. He married Wagner's daughter, Anna on 13 January 1872 and in March 1873 moved the studio into more luxurious premises in Prince Street. There, he advertised 'Portraits in any size and style of the Art, equal to Sydney Houses. Large instantaneous pictures of horses and cattle'. Between 1870 and 1873 he made township views, scenes of mining and group portraits. Mateship features as a theme amongst his images of teams of bush workers.

== Indigenous subjects ==
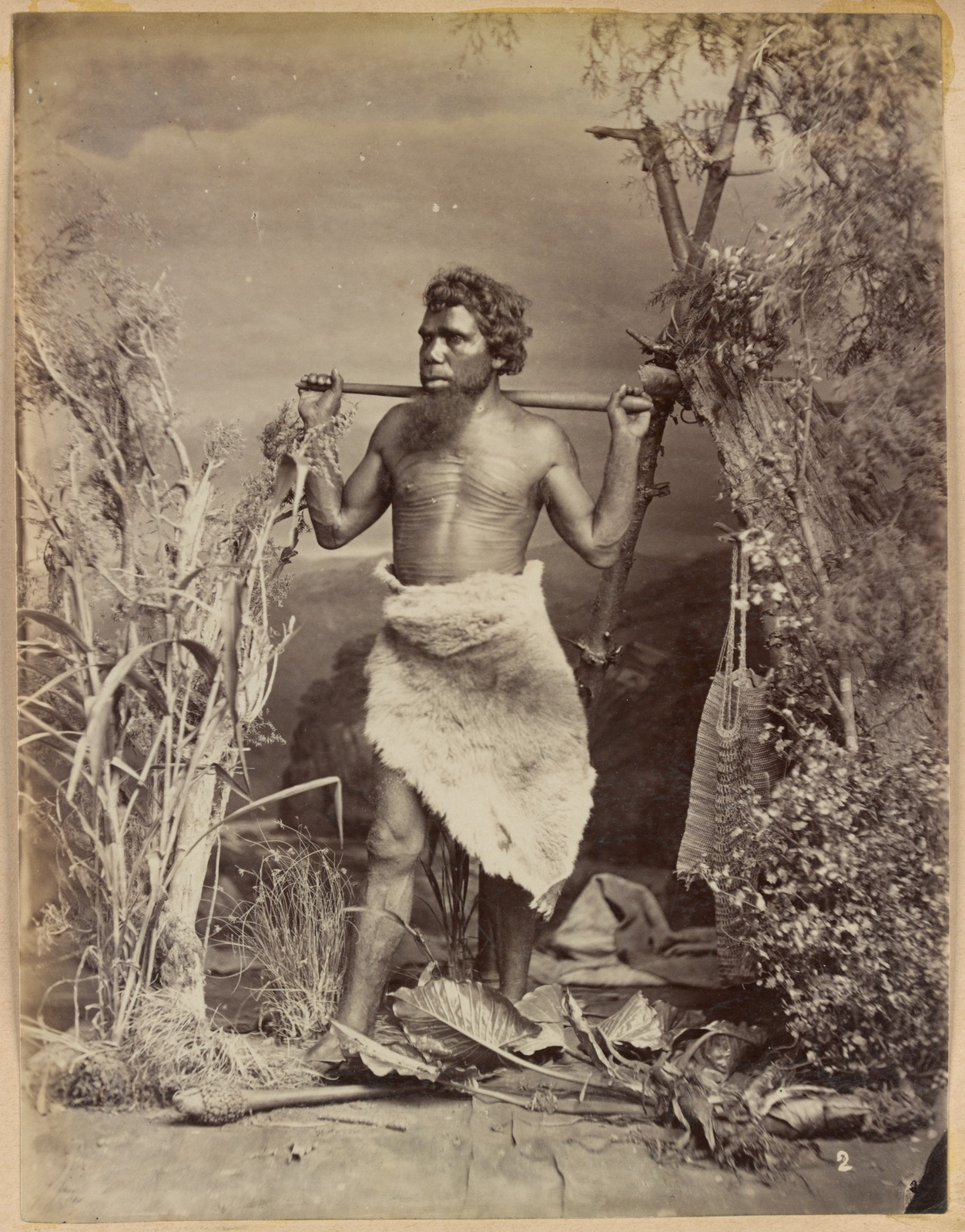
Studio portrait of an Aboriginal Australian (ca. 1870-1892) J. W. Lindt

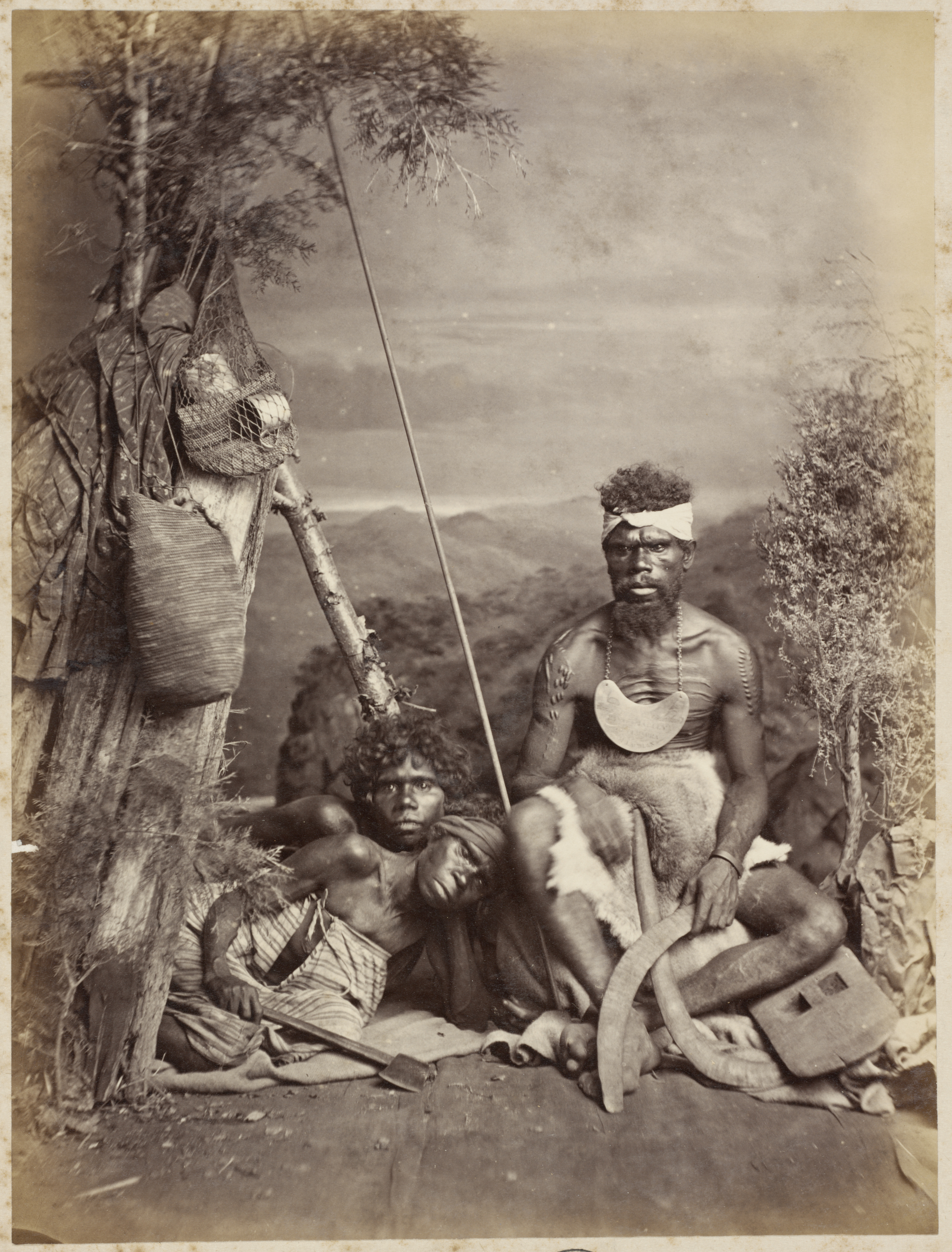
Two First Nations women and a man, Clarence River District, New South Wales, 1875

Over c.1873-1874, using the slow and laborious wet-plate collodion process Lindt produced photographs of the local indigenous people both in their environment conducting actual traditional ceremonies in the Clarence River district, and in his studio. In the latter, the subjects, set in elaborate recreations of natural environment, clothed traditionally, and surrounded by implements, are the more compositionally controlled because Lindt was able to prepare and process his plates with the necessary complex chemistry close at hand in his darkrooms. His prints were contact-printed from huge 20 x 16 inch (50.8 cm x 40.64 cm) wet plate negatives. Twelve of this series is included his 1874 album Australian Aboriginals. Also during his Grafton years, from 1869 to 1876, Lindt produced Australian Types (c.1873-1874); and Characteristic Australian Scenery (1875) commissioned by the New South Wales Government for the 1876 Philadelphia Centennial Exhibition. The albums include fastidiously composed and exposed images such as The Artist's Camp (Near Wintervale) (1875) and Tower Hill Creek, N.S.W. (1875) each meticulously printed, qualities he maintained in his imagery henceforth.

Contemporary commentary records the aboriginal studio portraits as "the first successful attempt at representing the native blacks truthfully as well as artistically." The Sydney Morning Herald, of 24 November 1874 expanded on what made the photographs attractive to Europeans;

There is no settled portion of our colony which affords a better field for the study of aboriginal bush life than that presented by our northern rivers, for there - although decreasing yearly in numbers as their territories become more settled upon by white population - the blacks preserve their customs and traditions, adhering more closely to true aboriginal life than tribes in other districts of New South Wales, and Mr Lindt can be complimented upon the artistic use he has made of the rugged subjects he has had at his disposal.

The report clearly sets out a cynical nostalgia for the traditional ways of these people which is made sentimental by noting their 'decreasing numbers' as their country was cleared by loggers, expressing a common attitude amongst the colonists that the indigenous populations were doomed. Several of the individuals in Lindt's group portraits were identified in an article in the Grafton Argus covering the occasion of his departure to Sydney on the paddle steamer Agnes Irving where he was to publish his album of "12 views 6 inches by 8 inches, mounted upon tinted cardboard, 12 x 10 inches, the whole to be arranged in portfolio wrapping...which when bound up would form a suitable present for friends in England and other parts." The Argus article gives descriptions of each image, for example;

"No. 6 is a group of natives comprising "King Charley", of Ulmarra, with his mother and gin; "King Charley" has the brass crescent plate round his neck which is used to denote his rank, and the war implements consisting of "boomerang," "nulla-nulla," "heliman," and "spear" are introduced together with a collection of "dilly-bags" and other appliances of domestic use."

In the album as published, in its presentation in exhibitions in Philadelphia, Calcutta and Amsterdam and in subsequent mechanical reprinting in the 1880s the captions, and thus identities, were omitted, and the subjects' clans and languages (Gumbaynggirr and Bandjalung), are not named and in other reproductions titles even incorrectly represent the subjects as being from 'Victoria' or elsewhere. The studio scenery and backdrops, while elaborate, are generic with little reference to the actual homelands of the people depicted. In recent times with the cooperation of the Grafton Regional Gallery, the subjects' identities are being traced by descendant Shauna Bostock-Smith, researcher Annika Korsgaard and others.

Despite their constructed nature and depiction of what was then (incorrectly) perceived as a vanishing culture, Lindt's Aboriginal tableaux were so highly regarded as scientific records when they were made that they were purchased by the New South Wales government for presentation to 'various scientific institutions in the old country'. Several were sent in 1875 to Italian Darwinist Enrico Giglioli. The current identities of such institutions, the Museum of Mankind, the Royal Anthropological Institute, the Royal Commonwealth Society (in London) and the Pitt Rivers Museum in Oxford, all retain copies, and one set, now held in the Cambridge University Museum of Archaeology and Ethnology, was acquired by Von Hégel on his 1874-77 visit to the South Pacific.

== Melbourne ==
Lindt moved to Melbourne in 1876 where he worked for Batchelder & Co. before opening his own opulent studios at number 7 at the top of Collins Street opposite the Treasury, in 1877. His cartes-de-visite had printed "J. W. Lindt, Photographer, Prize Medallist Philadelphia, Sydney, Brisbane, Paris, 7 Collins Street, Melbourne" on the back. At a time of great wealth in Melbourne lavishly appointed studios were a sign of the rising status of photography in Australia, as elsewhere, and Lindt's studio was a prime example; his apprentice Herman Carl Krutli, who first visited within its third year remembered the 'rich crimson velvet pile carpet of the reception room' and posing for Lindt's first dry plate exposure in 1880. Lindt's business of this period was wide-ranging, and included portraits, records of Melbourne public buildings and streetscapes, the Botanical Gardens, and Port Melbourne. Tall and prepossessing, Lindt is remembered in 1955 by Jack Cato in this colourful description in his The Story of the Camera in Australia:

"he was a man of great dignity, but he was simply a great MAN [sic] and wherever he happened to be he was as obvious as a mountain in a desert. He was a handsome giant with a barrel of a chest, a dark sandy beard, and a mass of strong hair. He had high principles and all the fine virtues of the mid-nineteenth century German; was shrewd in business and industrious; a lover of music, fluent in four languages, and possessing a quality of charm which brought him friends in high places. He loved congenial company, was impatient with bores, could also be over-forceful and dominating, and never far away was that touch of austerity which, in his later years, was to turn him into something of a recluse."

He was a welcome photographer of members of parliament and other Melbourne personalities, their society and cultural life including the theatre, and was known as a 'rich man's photographer' for those whose families he grouped informally on the lawns in front of their mansions, with servants at the rails of the upstairs balconies. He continued with landscape, producing folios Fernshaw and Watt River Scenery, Victoria ( c.1878-82), Scenery on the Ovens and Buckland Rivers, Victoria (c.1878–82) and Lorne, Louttit Bay and Cape Otway Ranges (1883). Sales of his Black Spur scenery amounted to approximately 25,000 copies printed from the original negatives between 1882 and 1892.

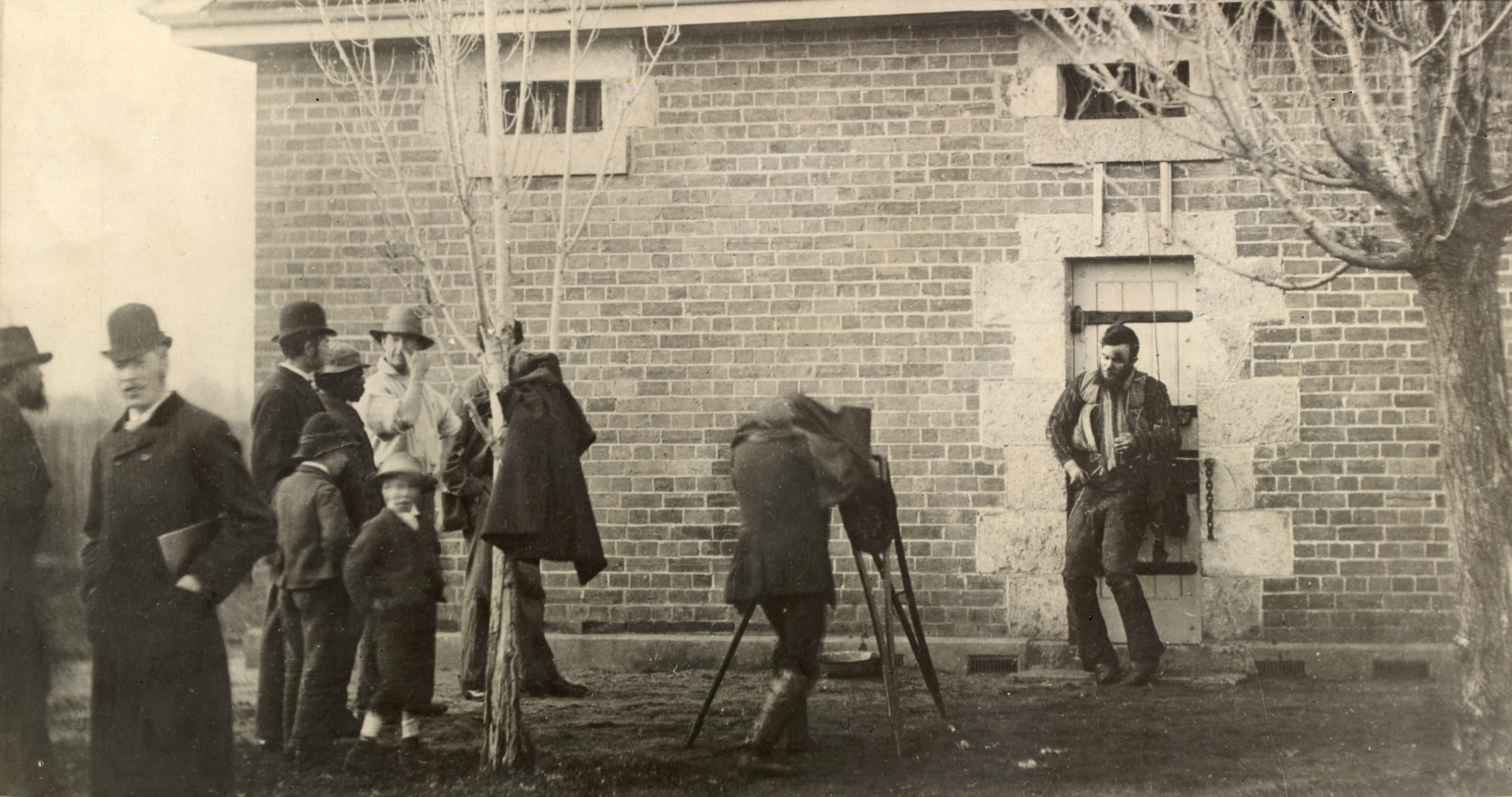
J.W. Lindt (1880) Body of Joe Byrne, member of the Kelly gang, hung up for photography, outside the Benalla lock-up.

In June 1880 a Melbourne newspaper commissioned Lindt to document the capture of the notorious bush-rangers, the Kelly gang in Glenrowan, Victoria. Arriving after the event, Lindt produced a wet plate image Body of Joe Byrne, member of the Kelly gang, hung up for photography, outside the Benalla lock-up. His panoramic image, made on 29 June, encompasses the Victorian government photographer A.W. Burman (son of William Insull Burman ), the artist Julian Ashton sketching Byrne's body for the Illustrated Sydney News, with casual bystanders. It is amongst his most famous images and has been hailed as the earliest press photograph taken in Australia.

During the early 1880s Lindt contemplated exchanging his career from photographer to photographic supplier, after his return abroad the Liguria on 31 August 1881 from visiting Europe to source the latest photographic equipment, Lindt became sole Australian agent for numerous studio suppliers, including Enholtz's scenic backgrounds. Thus keeping abreast of developments in the medium, from about 1881 he was using the recently introduced Voigtländer Euryscope lenses on his Haake & Albers' studio cameras, and to produce enlargements. He quickly adopted the commercial dry plates which he ordered from England soon after they became commercially available. An accomplished technician, he readily adapted and invented equipment to suit his needs. From 1884 operated a second studio installed behind his newly acquired estate; 'Ethelred' in Hawthorn, in order to accommodate the high demand for his work.

== New Guinea ==
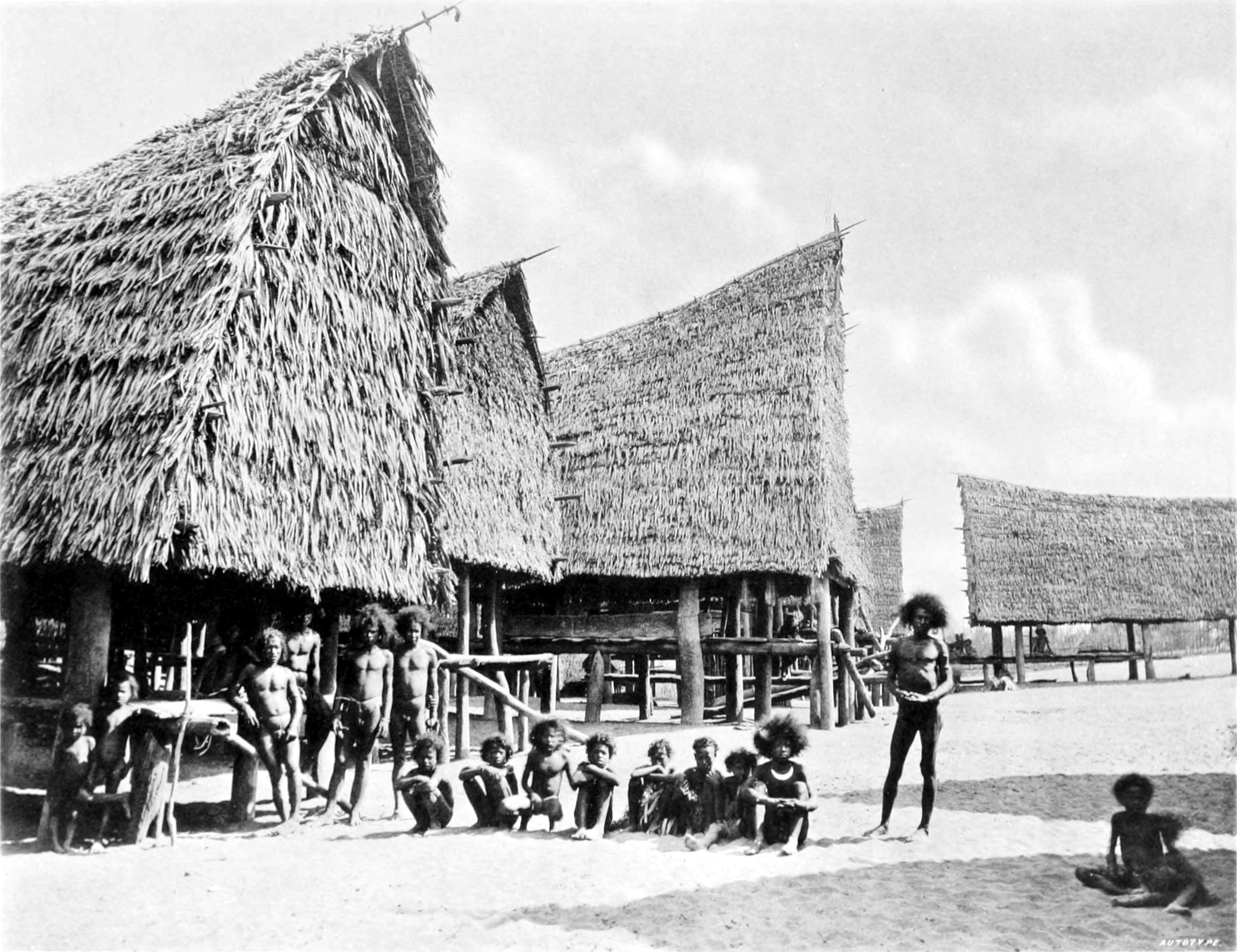
illage Scene at Moapa, Aroma District 1885, by J.W. Lindt

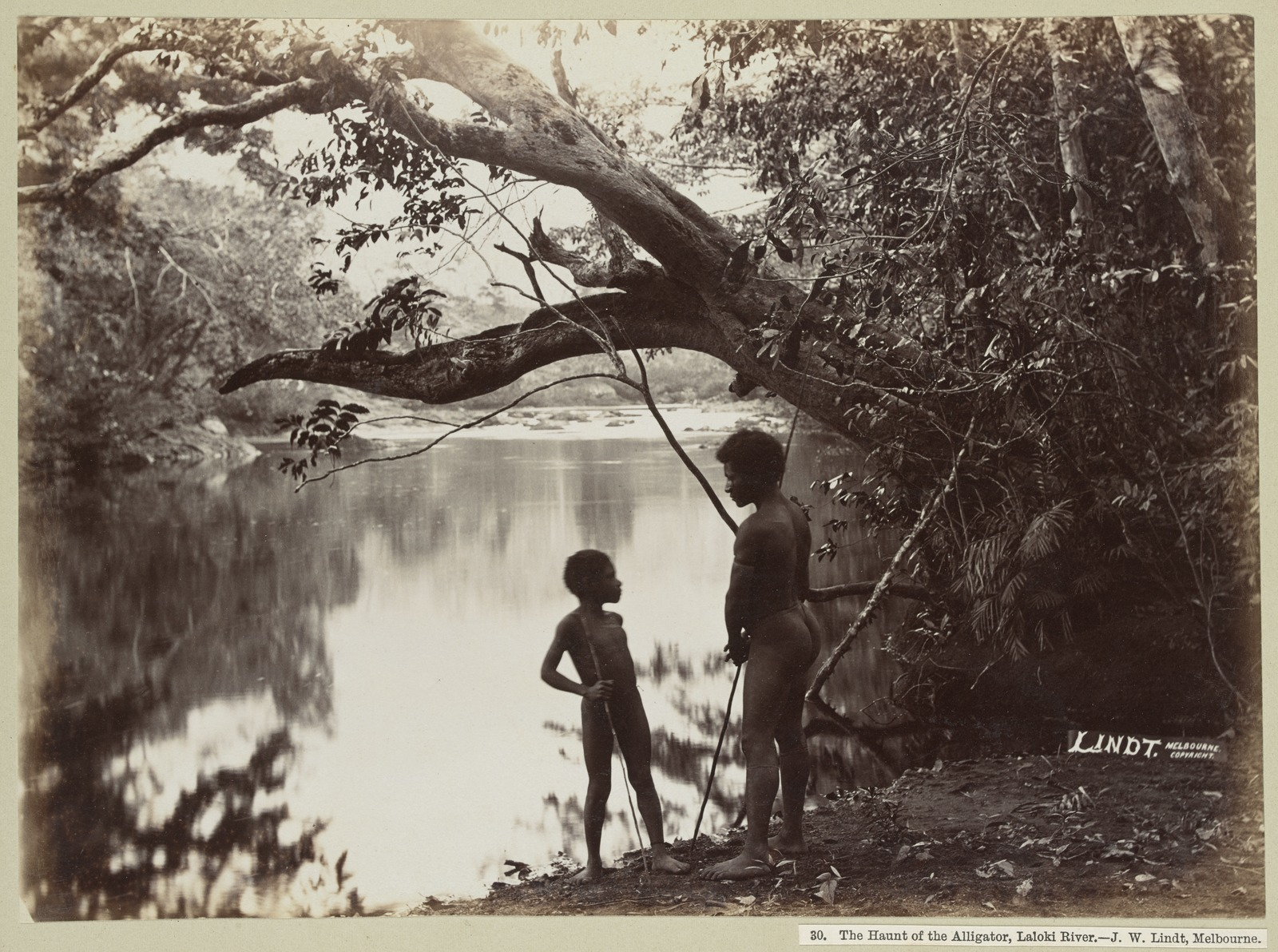
The haunt of the alligator, Laloki River, 1885, by J. W. Lindt

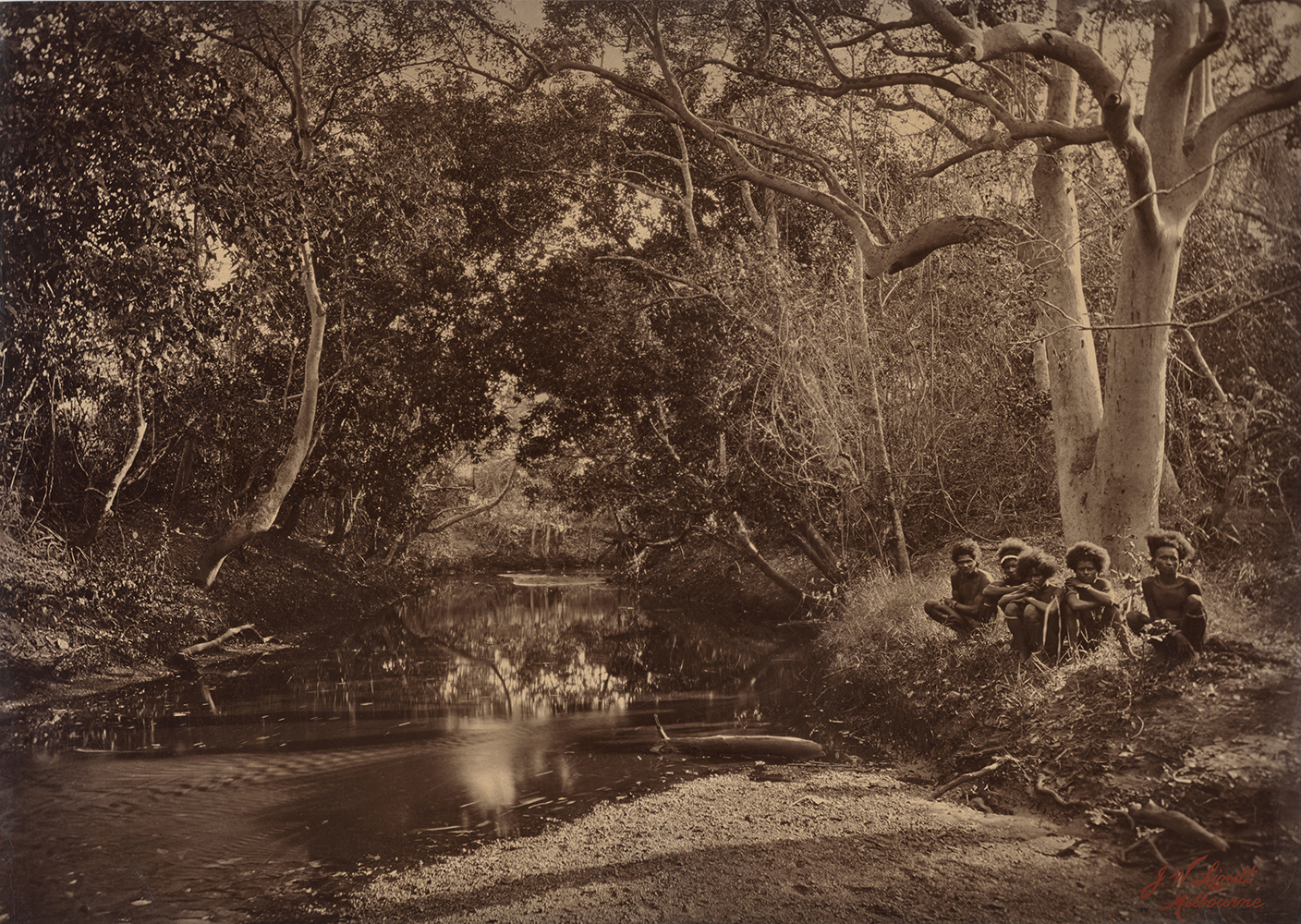
Ka Kalo Creek, Papua New Guinea, 1885, by JW Lindt, printed c. 1893

A keen ethnographer of the nineteenth-century persuasion, in 1885 Lindt joined Major-General Sir Peter Scratchley, superintendent of coastal defences, in an expedition from Sydney on the Governor Blackall to the newly proclaimed Protectorate of British New Guinea. As its official photographer, his first journey was up the Laloki River as far as the Rano Falls to the native villages at Sadara and Makara, then he made pictures of a lakatois on Port Moresby harbour, before venturing into the Owen Stanley Range, at night processing his plates by the light of a hurricane lamp wrapped in red trade cloth. Receiving news that his wife was ill, they returned, but Sir Peter Scratchley died of fever on the return journey.

Lindt produced several hundred dry plate negatives of tribal life, and the resultant album was shown at the Indian and Colonial Exhibition in London in 1886. During a visit to the optical institutions and manufacturers which he represented commercially, Lindt secured a publisher for fifty of these pictures in Picturesque New Guinea (London, 1887) which, printed in a new autotype process, took full commercial advantage of the advent of half-tone printing. By this means, the 1880s photographs by Lindt were the earliest from PNG to be seen by a wider audience, which enhanced his reputation as a photographer. Hasselberg and Quanchi note that Lindt's iconic images, such as the water-carrier, lakotoi sailing canoe and the tree houses, became exemplars imitated by photographers who followed.

In the next year, he was honoured with appointment as a Fellow in the Royal Geographical Society. In 1888 The Argus praised the quality of this work: "It has often been a matter of discussion how far, or whether at all photography may be considered a fine art. By the work of J. W. Lindt this question is decided in a way that is a triumph for his profession.

== Collins Street studio ==
In 1889 Lindt moved his studio to 177 Collins Street and on 10 July 1889 he married his retoucher Catherine Elizabeth Cousens after the death, on 27 May 1888, of his first wife in giving birth to a stillborn.

He was commissioned by the Victorian Government to document, for a series of promotional lantern slide lectures, the Chaffey brothers' pioneering irrigation works on the River Murray at Mildura in north-west Victoria. The Royal Geographical Society (R.G.S.) supported Lindt's further expeditions, first to the New Hebrides in 1890 where in June he climbed the Tanna volcano, and to Fiji in 1891 during which he documented a fire-walking ceremony, first published as plates in the Transactions of the R.G.S, that were hailed as proof that the traditional ordeal did exist and was not a visual figment of group hysteria. Having made his island imagery into lantern slides he conducted numerous popular lectures which were credited with creating a boom in island tourism.

== Later career ==
Though he had speculated in the 1880s land boom as a director of the Melbourne and Adelaide Real Estate Company, Lindt was adversely impacted by the subsequent 1890s depression so that in 1893 he was advertising that his rates of "16 years" for 'cabinet portraits' were being reduced from 40 shillings per dozen to 15s/6d (2018 equivalents of $A250, to $A100), and he exhibited at his 'Austral Studios' at 117 Collins Street a series of city views, at a half-price cut from "15 shillings a dozen to 8s. and 6d a dozen" for work that had "won thirty gold medals". He managed to produce a last ethnographic portfolio, of a touring Northern Australian Aboriginal performing troupe in an indoor studio setting in 1893, before in 1894 or 1895, he closed his studio.

As early as 1883 he had been exhibiting pictures of the Blacks' Spur (now Black Spur) in the Dandenong Ranges and, having survived the economic depression, in 1894 he built and moved to a guesthouse 'The Hermitage' with a garden designed by his friend Ferdinand von Mueller, and featuring New Guinea tree houses from which he made frequent panoramas of his property and surrounding primeval forest of towering, 30-metre mountain ash. There, from the age of 50, and in semi-retirement, he wrote articles, conducted international correspondence, and continued his photography in a studio 30m x 8m, with a wall glazed in ground glass. In it he photographed guests, of whom he also made outdoor portraits in the bush setting, and projected lantern slides for their entertainment. He showed in the Victorian Artists Society's Albert Street Art Gallery in 1909. In 1913 he collaborated with Nicholas Caire to produce a tourist booklet on the area.

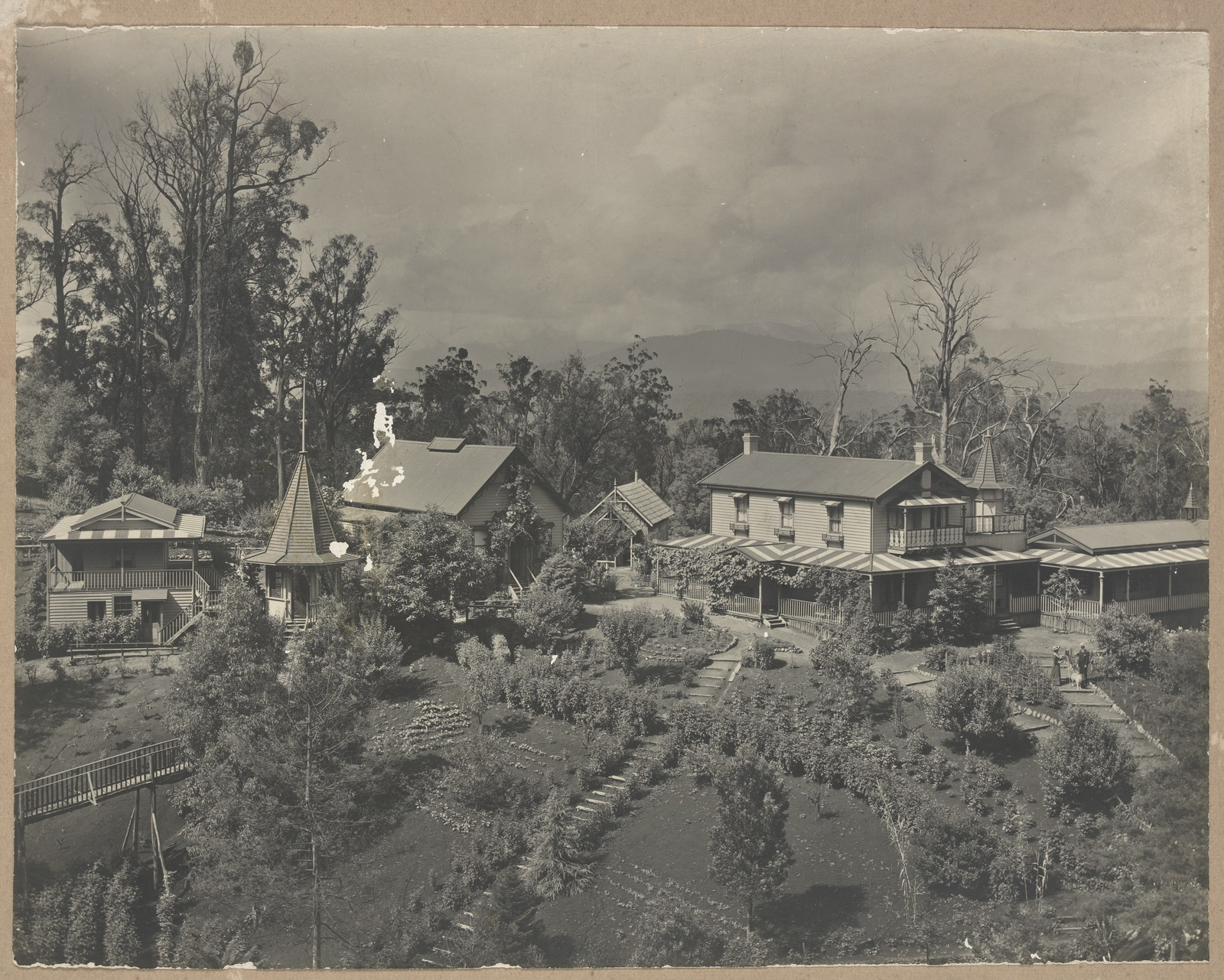
J. W. Lindt (Hermitage, Narbethong) ca. 1890-1910 State Library Victoria H94.170/1

Though he suffered from anti-German sentiment during and after WW1, and had to defend himself when a public meeting was called at the local shire council hall to demand that he be sent to a concentration camp, Lindt continued to sell prints from his older glass negatives and from new photographs he took of his forest home, guests in his gardens, and genre scenes. In 1925 the Argus reported that Lindt "continues to produce remarkable and most artistic pictures of the beauties of mountain landscape. He is not a believer in the blurred effects favoured by many ... instead he is a master of detail."

Aged 81 Lindt died of heart failure during disastrous bushfires on 19 February 1926 at the Hermitage. He was survived by his wife Catherine who continued to run 'The Hermitage' guest house before she retired to the city. In the early 1930s, Joan Anderson purchased the property, maintaining it as a guest house until the 1950s after which the condition of the property deteriorated until in 1979 it was sold and restored, and reopened as a guest house in 1988.

== Contemporary evaluation ==
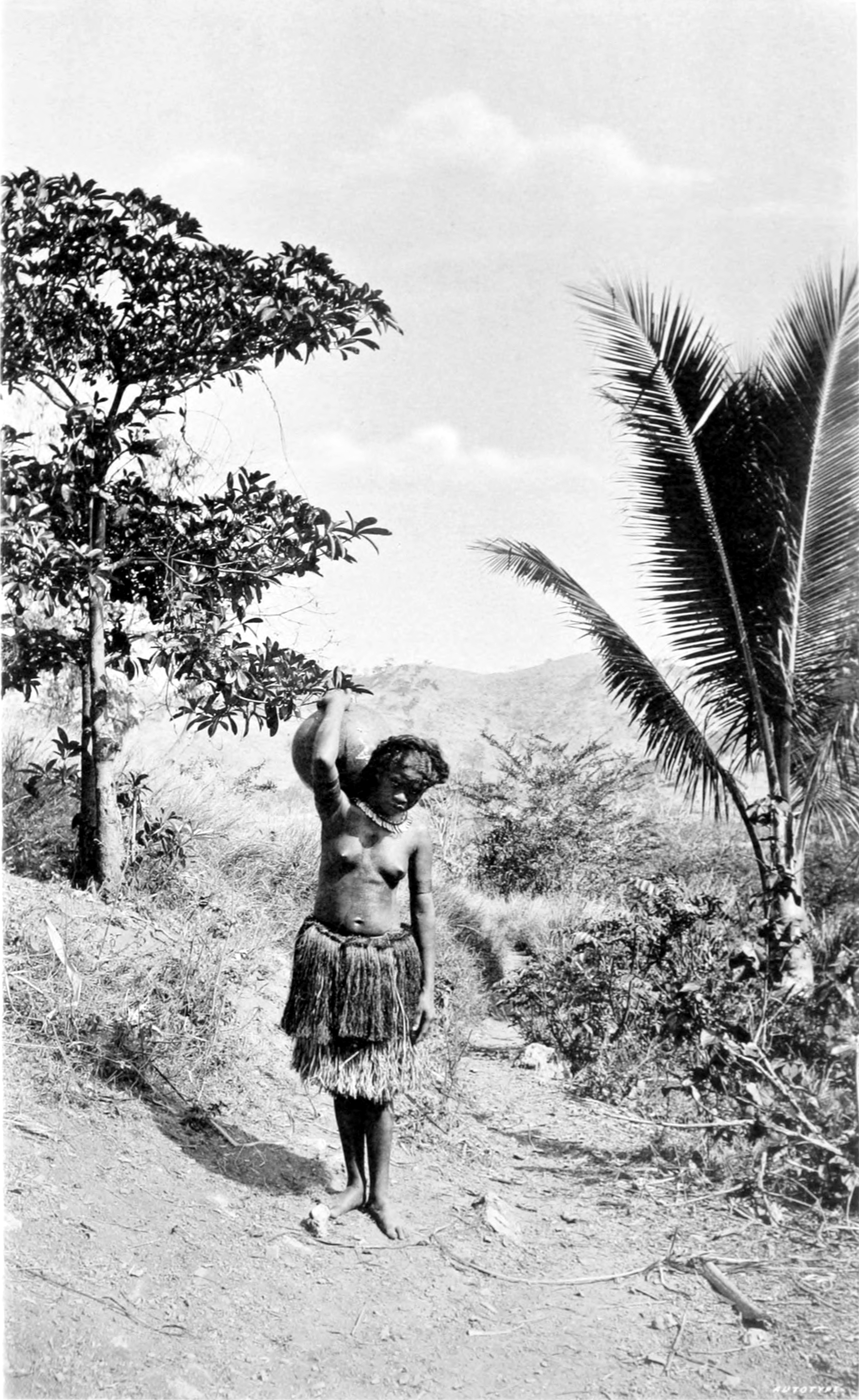
J.W. Lindt (1885) 'Motu Water Carrier, Port Moresby,' Plate I from Picturesque New Guinea

Lindt's staged studio spectacles of indigenous people are now regarded as exemplifying a colonial attitude that the Australian aborigine was an inferior, dying race whose inevitable vanishment was a romantic curiosity that warranted a photographic record. In the field, in New Guinea, his marketable imagery of the 'mysterious shores of Papua and their savage inhabitants' were posed, by subjects bribed or coerced to do so, against suitably picturesque backgrounds chosen by Lindt, and thus are no more accurate as ethnographic records than his studio tableaux, and are loaded with romance and prejudice derived from his reading of British accounts and diaries of colonialists' adventures in Africa.

Quanchi criticises the voyeuristic intention of the cover image, widely reproduced and imitated, of Picturesque New Guinea, which shows an adolescent, bare-breasted, partially clothed Motu girl carrying a pot on her shoulder. The 'natural' backdrop was, nevertheless, a device he continued even with his European subjects who were guests at 'The Hermitage'.

Lindt's landscapes, even his earliest made along the Orara River, a tributary of the Clarence, have continued to earn praise as fine examples of 'proto-' Pictorialism; he being regarded as "one of the first photographers to use the camera creatively to move beyond recording to make evocative pictures...recognised nationally and internationally for his artistic contribution to the development of photography." Boddington notes a "true serenity and majesty of nature" in Lindt's landscapes but cautions that they "deteriorate eventually to sentimentality", and though by the 1930s numbers of Australian Pictorialists "glorified the gum-tree", they were "a lamentable descent from John William Lindt" though the decline was "indicated, hinted at, foreseen in his latest bush studies when he had so completely withdrawn to The Hermitage." His c.1890 maritime drama, a purposefully-worked albumen print showing a stricken vessel under breaking skies is a notable example from the zenith of his powers.

However in the case of Lindt's New Guinea landscapes, Ryan shows that he used the presence of indigenous inhabitants for aesthetic appeal, adding or subtracting figures to make a picturesque effect in support of a colonialist ideology. Instead of etching his image title and name into the emulsion of his plates as was the convention, Lindt physically inserted a small wooden sign 'LINDT, MELBOURNE, COPYRIGHT' in white lettering, into the scene (see above; The Haunt of the Alligator, Laloki River), in effect "staking his claim to the landscape and marking permanently the scene as his property and copyright," and thus photography becomes an instrument of visual colonisation, just as did cartography and surveying, translating "unknown territory into familiar scenes, opening up distant territory to imperial eyes"

== Publications ==
- Lindt, J. W. (John William); Centennial International Exhibition (1888-1889 : Melbourne, Vic.) (1888), British New Guinea : ethnographical collection and samples of raw products, J. W. Lindt
- Lindt, J. W. (John William); Caire, Nicholas (1904), Companion guide to Healesville, Blacks' Spur, Narbethong and Marysville, Atlas Press
- Lindt, J. W. (John William); V. V (1883), A few results of modern photography, Printed by Welch & Whitelaw
- Centennial International Exhibition (1888-1889 : Melbourne, Vic.); Lindt, J. W. (John William) (1888), Collections from British New Guinea exhibited by Her Majesty's Special Commissioner. : in charge of J.W. Lindt, Warwick and Sapsford Printers
- Lindt, J. W. (John William) (1885), Narrative of the expedition of the Australian Squadron to the south-east coast of New Guinea : October to December, 1884, T. Richards, Govt. Printer
- Lindt, J. W. (John William) (1887), Picturesque New Guinea : with an historical introduction and supplementary chapters on the manners and customs of the Papuans, Longmans, Green

== Exhibitions ==
- 1876, August; 'Queensland Exhibition', Brisbane
- 1893, March; Views of Melbourne and other cities, Austral Studio, 119 Collins St., Melbourne

== Retrospective exhibitions ==
- Portraits of Oceania: 27 August-26 October 1997, Art Gallery of New South Wales
- Australien im Auge der Kamera: Charles Kerry, John W. Lindt, 29 Oct – 5 Dec 2004, Ethnological Museum of Berlin
- An unorthodox flow of images, Melbourne Festival, 29 Sep – 12 Nov 2017, Centre for Contemporary Photography, Melbourne

== Collections ==
- State Library of Victoria, Melbourne
- State Library of New South Wales, Sydney
- National Gallery of Australia, Canberra
- National Library of Australia, Canberra
- National Gallery of Victoria, Melbourne
- Clarence River Historical Society, Grafton
- Grafton Regional Gallery

== Awards and recognition ==
- April 1876: silver medal from the New South Wales Academy of Art
- International photographic exhibition at Frankfurt: judge
- Photographic Association of Vienna: gold medal
- Fellow of the Royal Geographical Society, London.
- Medals in exhibitions in Amsterdam, Calcutta and Frankfurt.
- 1888 Melbourne International Exhibition: official photographer
- 1893: councillor of the Victorian branch of the Royal Geographical Society
