= Black Spur =

Road in Victoria, Australia

The Black Spur Black Spur Drive Victoria
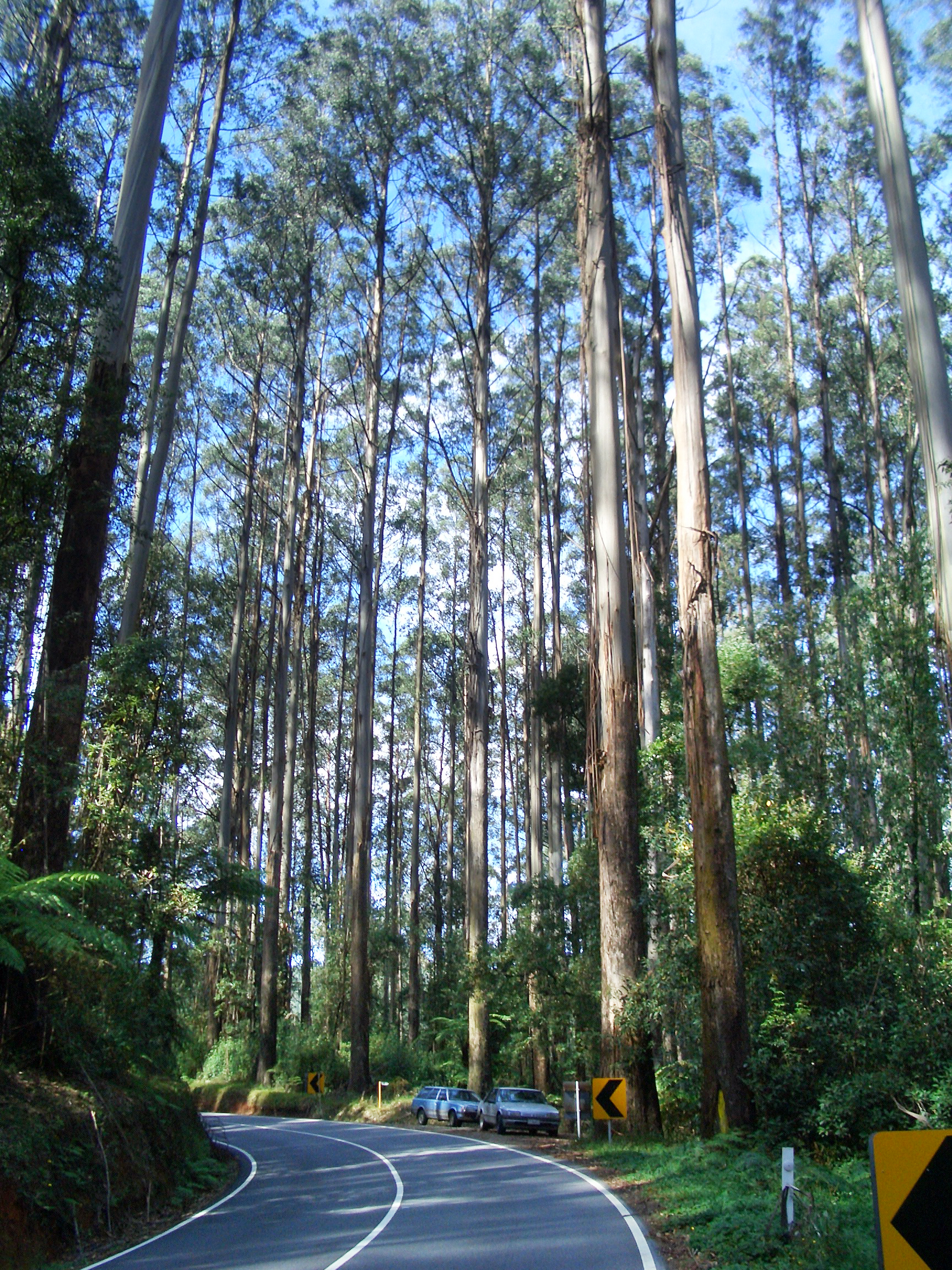
- Mountain ash (Eucalyptus regnans) along the Maroondah Highway on the Black Spur

General information
- Type: Road
- Length: 30 km (19 mi)

Major junctions
- Southwest end: Healesville
- Northeast end: Narbethong

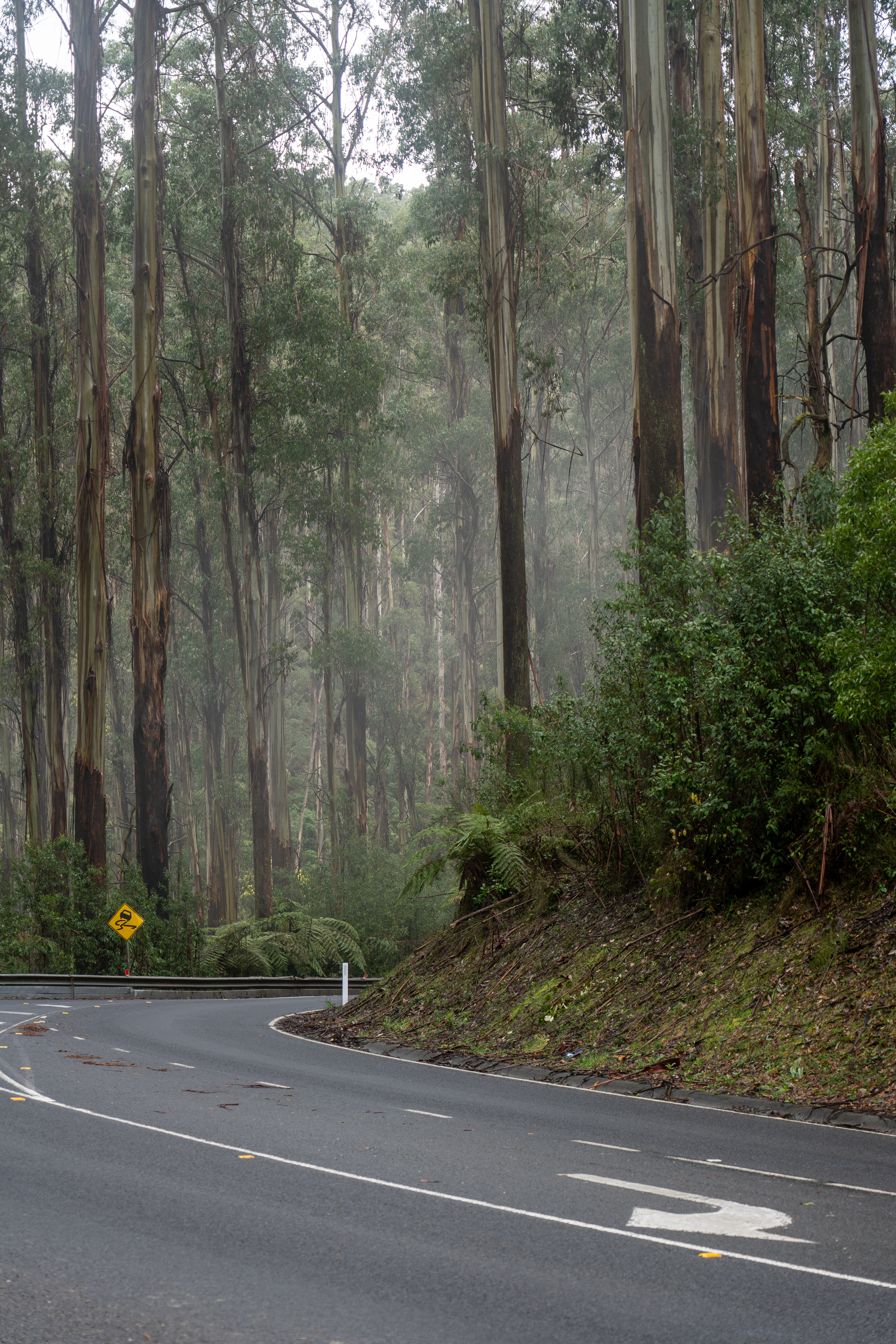
The Black Spur near the Dom Dom Saddle picnic area

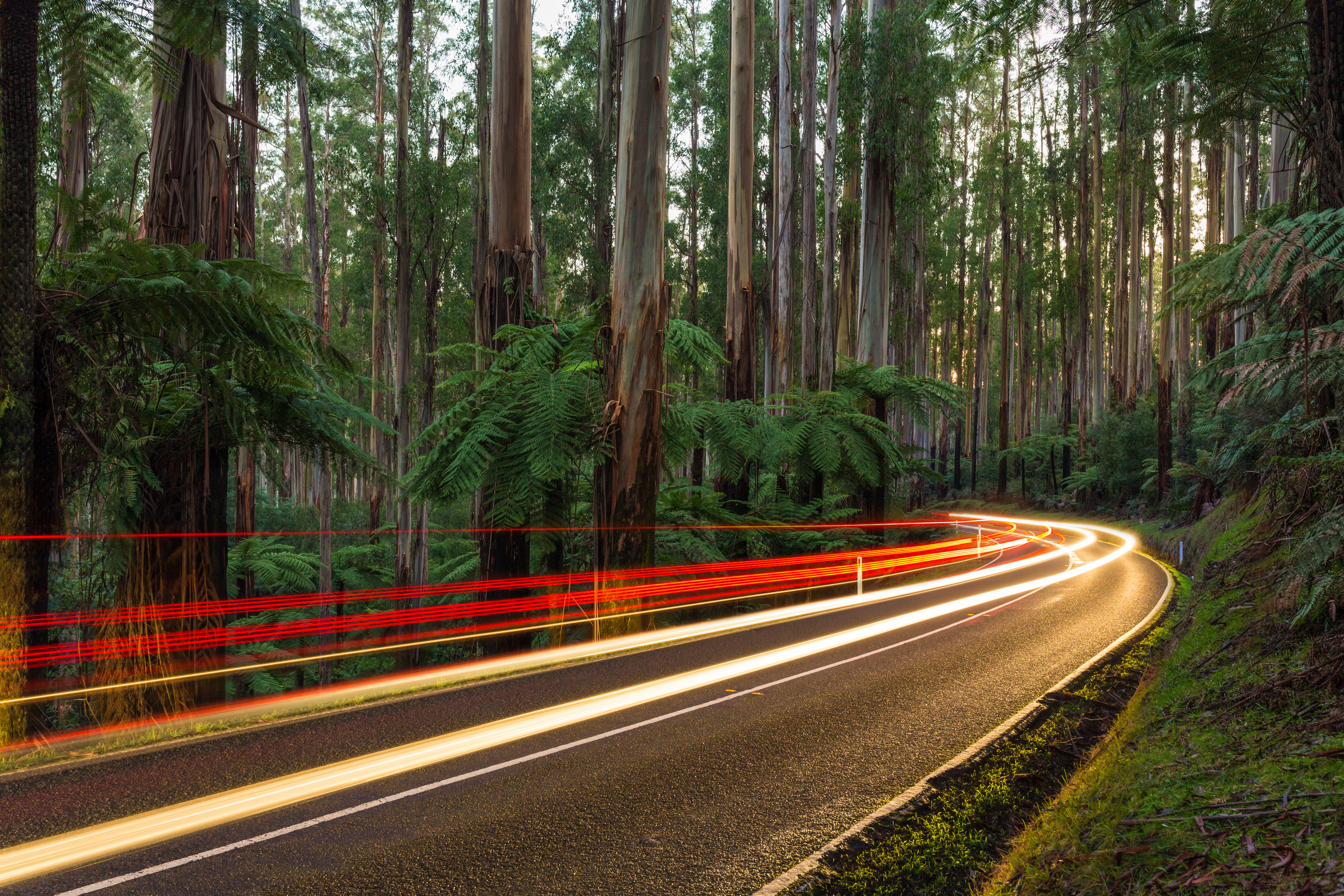
Light trails from cars in 2019

The Black Spur is a road between the towns of Healesville and Narbethong in Victoria, Australia. It is also known as Black Spur Drive and is part of the Maroondah Highway.

== Location ==
The Black Spur is approximately 60 kilometres northeast of Melbourne on the Maroondah Highway between Healesville and Marysville.

== Etymology ==
Originally known as "The Blacks' Spur", the road gained its name from the route that displaced Aboriginal people from northern Victoria used to take on their way to a settlement at Corranderrk, near Healesville.

== History ==
During the mid-1890s depression, German-born Melbourne photographer John William Lindt closed his studio. As early as 1883 he had been exhibiting pictures of the Blacks' Spur, where he built and moved to a guesthouse, The Hermitage, in gardens set out by his friend Ferdinand von Mueller. The gardens feature New Guinea tree houses from which Lindt made frequent panoramas of his property and surrounding primeval forest of towering, 30-metre mountain ash. The Hermitage contained a 30m x 8m studio, with a wall glazed in ground glass. In it, he photographed guests, of whom he also made outdoor portraits in the bush setting.

In 1913, Lindt collaborated with Nicholas Caire to produce a tourist booklet on the area. Lindt suffered from anti-German sentiment during and after WW1, and had to defend himself when a public meeting was called at the local shire council hall to demand that he be sent to an internment camp. Lindt continued to sell prints from his older glass negatives, and from new photographs he took of his forest home, guests in his gardens, and genre scenes. Some of those prints are accessible on the sites of State Library of Victoria, State Library of New South Wales, National Gallery of Australia, National Library of Australia, and the National Gallery of Victoria.

In 2009, a large section of Black Spur was damaged during the Black Saturday bushfires.

In 2019, Angie Suryadi, a woman from Melbourne was killed on the Black Spur when a large tree fell on her family's car during strong winds. Her four year old son was injured.

== Description of road ==
The road has undergone restoration and improvements in August 2006, and was widened later that same year. It consists of a series of hairpin turns punctuated by short straights. Some corners are prone to dampness due to the ferny rainforest surroundings. The surrounding landscape has tall mountain ash trees and tree ferns, the typical of southeastern Australia's temperate rainforests.

In March 2008, the Victorian State government allocated $547,000 to improve road safety on the Black Spur. Stage 1 of the works involved reducing the speed limit from 100 to 80 km/h in May 2008.

== Statistics ==
- Length: 30 km
- Corner Ratio: 80%
- Corner Speeds: 35–60 km/h
- Legal Speed Limit: 80 km/h
- Traffic: 2–5 (cars/min)
- Bumpiness: Smooth some corrugation
- Bitumen Grip: Very grippy
- Special Notes: The rainforest surroundings mean the road is often damp. There is regularly bark on the road in winter and bushfires in the area in summer.
