= Agnes Irving =

British paddle steamer

Coordinates: 30.806350°S 153.005007°E

History

New South Wales
- Name: Agnes Irving
- Owner: Clarence and Richmond River Steam Navigation Company
- Port of registry: Sydney
- Builder: Charles Lungley Kent, Deptford Green, United Kingdom
- Completed: 1862
- Identification: Registration number: 59/1862; Official number: 43237
- Fate: Wrecked 28 December 1879

General characteristics
- Type: Iron paddle steamer
- Tonnage: 431 GRT
- Displacement: 333 NRT
- Length: 62.02 m
- Beam: 7.467 m
- Draught: 3.566 m
- Propulsion: Oscillating steam engine

The Agnes Irving was an iron paddle steamer built in 1862 at Charles Lungley's Dockyard, Deptford Green on the River Thames, London. It was wrecked on 28 December 1879, when it entered the Macleay River on ebb tide whilst carrying general cargo from Sydney, and was lost off the South Spit of the old entrance of Trial Bay, New South Wales.
