= Nicholas Caire =

Australian photographer (1837–1918)

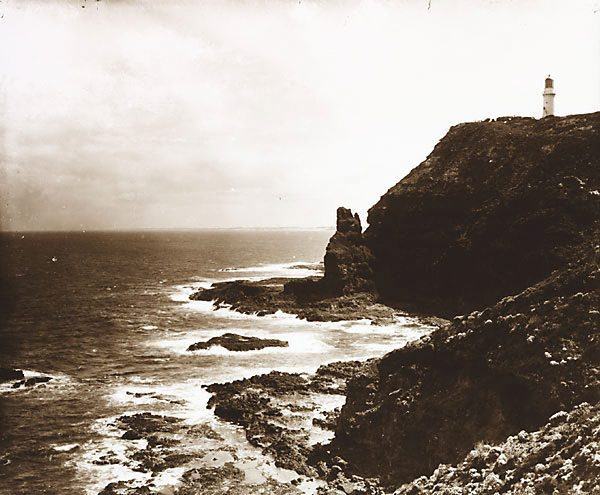
- Cape Schanke and lighthouse, Flinders
- Born: Nicholas John Caire; 28 February 1837; Guernsey, Channel Islands
- Died: 13 February 1918 (aged 80); Armadale, Victoria,
- Occupation: Photographer
- Spouse: Louisa Master

Nicholas John Caire (28 February 1837 – 13 February 1918) was an Australian photographer. Caire was born in Guernsey, Channel Islands, to Nicholas Caire and Hannah Margeret. As a boy Caire spoke French found he had a passion for photography that his parents encouraged. Caire moved to Adelaide, Australia, along with both his parents in 1860. Around this time Caire Found a mentor in Townsend Duryea. in 1867 he opened his own studio in Adelaide, Australia. He was married to Louisa Master in 1870 and then shortly after moved to Talbot, Victoria where he continued his photography and started to write for Life and Health Magazine. Caire died in 1918 in Armadale, Victoria.

== Photography ==
At a young age Caire developed his passion for his photography and, with encouragement from his parents, he pursued this goal his entire life. Caire never pursued any other career goals that didn't include photography. Shortly after, he moved to Australia he found his mentor, photographer Townsend Duryea. His work in 1865 consisted of him taking Wet plate images of the Indigenous Australians in Gippsland. Two years later in 1867 Caire opened his first studio in Adelaide, Australia. Three years later Caire moved to Talbot, Victoria. In 1876 he brought his second studio in Collins Street, Melbourne.

Until 1885, Caire specialized mostly in portrait photography, The development of the Dry Plate process in 1855 revolutionized what photographers could do with landscape photography. This caused him to leave the city and set up a new studio in South Yarra. At this point Caire decided to focus on outdoor photography, particularly the Australian landscape. His photography aided in helping the tourism around Gippsland, the place which one of his most popular bodies of work, Gippsland Scenery, was named, this body of work is believed to have contained roughly 60 images. Then when Australia got access to x-ray photography, Caire would shoot X-Ray photography at the Melbourne General Hospital one day each week, he did this for free.

He would only work with what he considered to be perfect conditions, this meant he would only take one or maybe two images a day, but because of the image quality in the work he would produce he could sell his works for a very high price and in large quantities. His best known series documented the rewards and hardships in the daily life of the first settlers.

Photographs of settler life & south-eastern Victoria landscapes taken by N.J. Caire
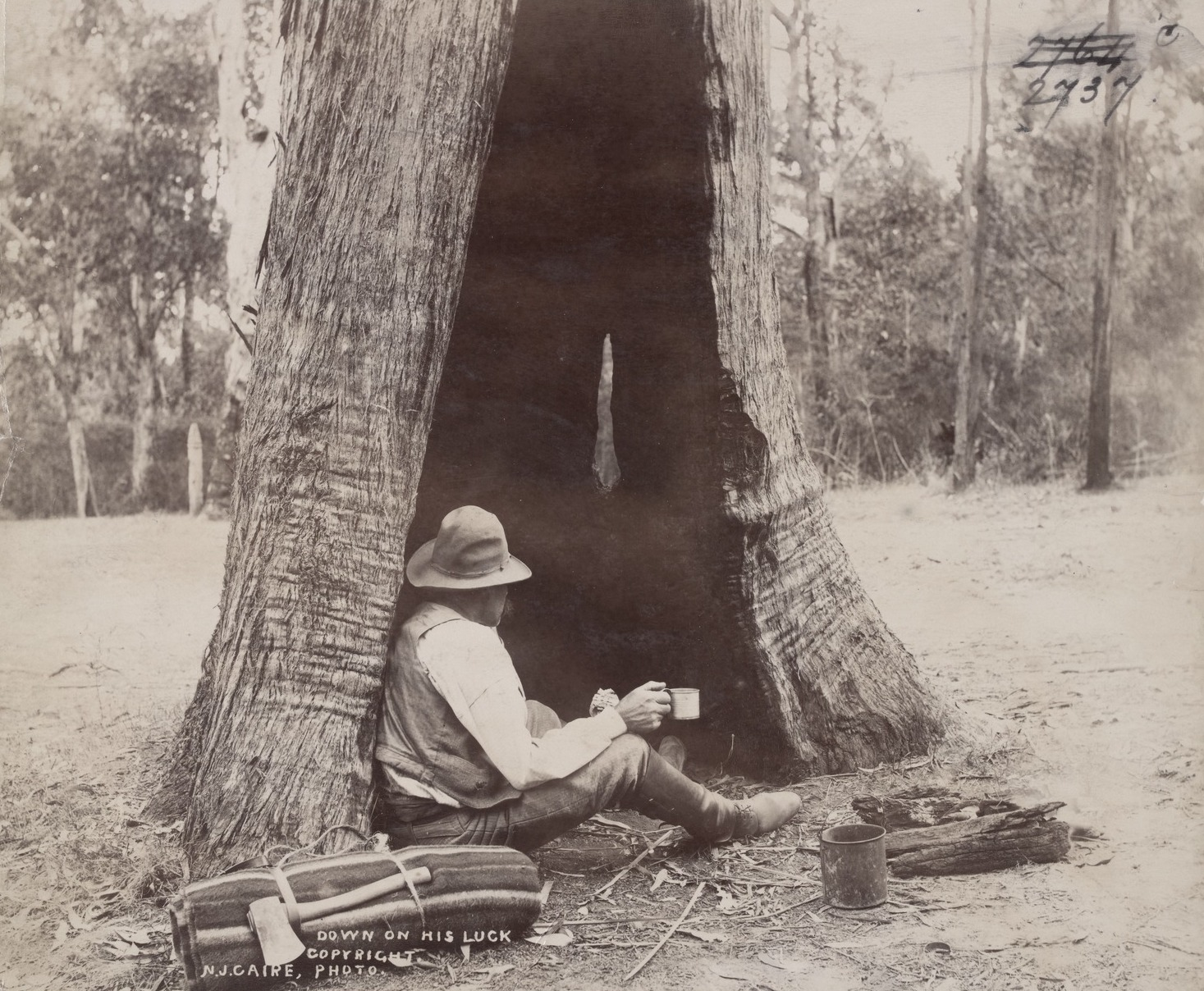
Down on his Luck

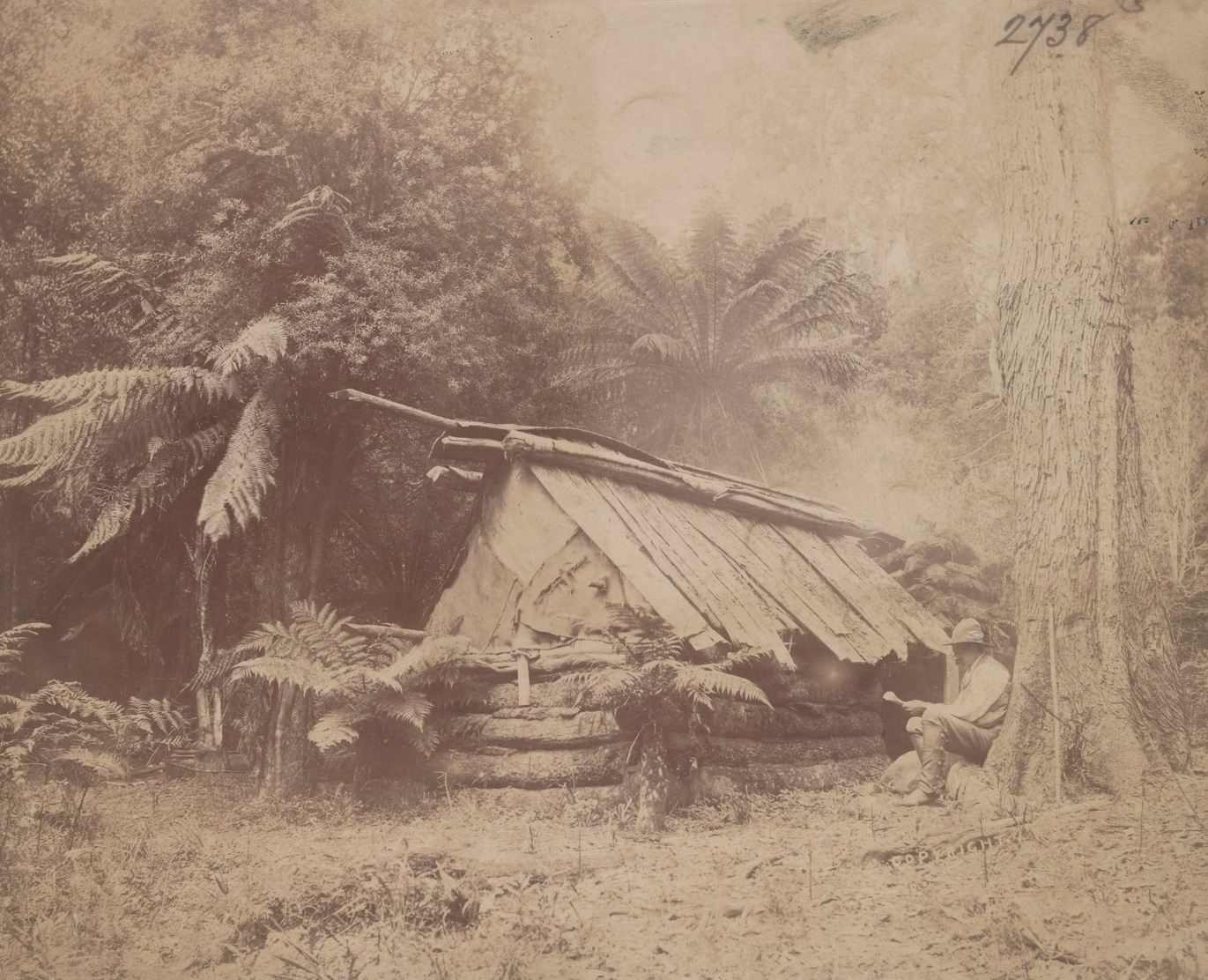
Bush Hut

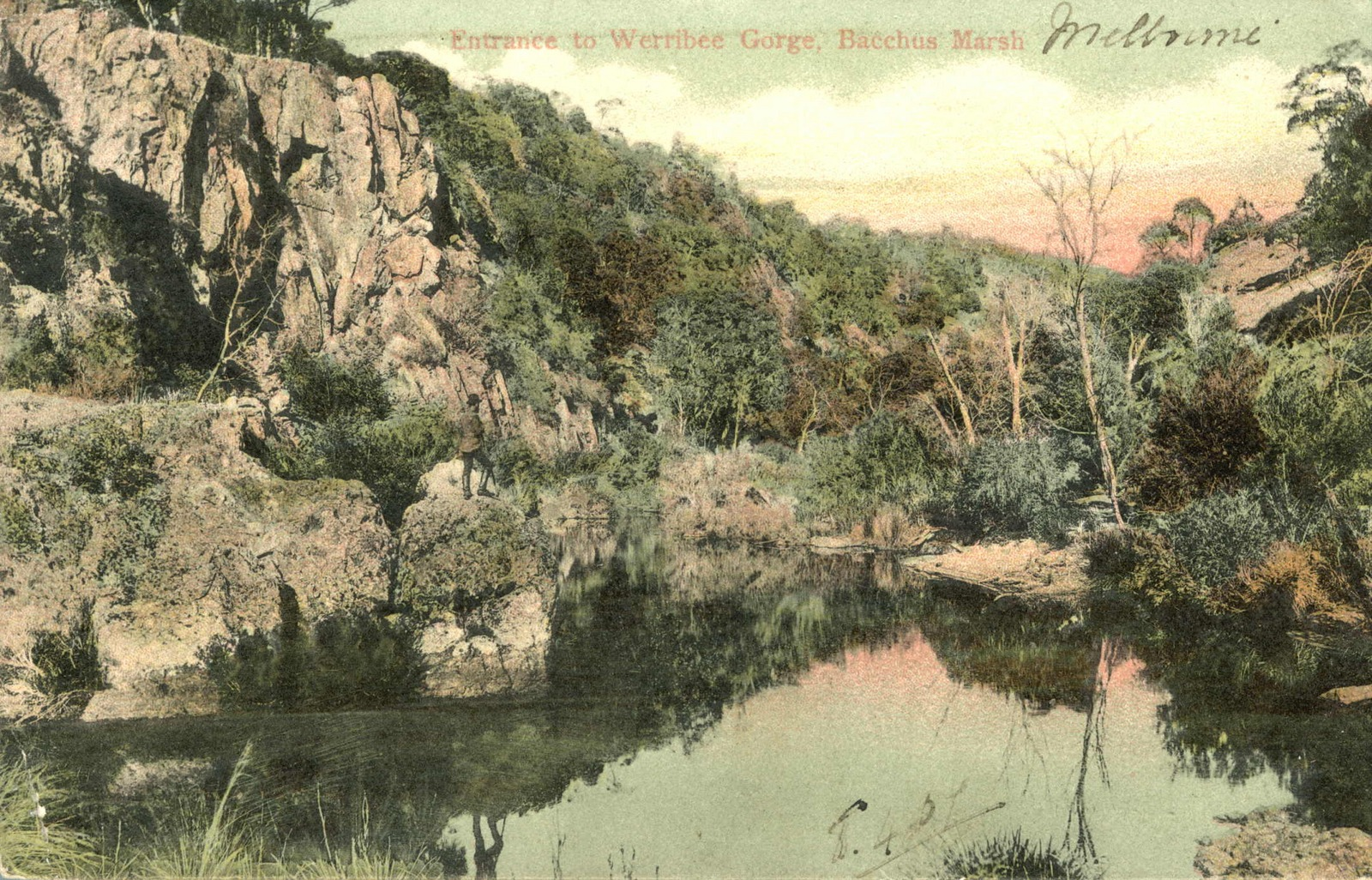
Entrance to Werribee Gorge

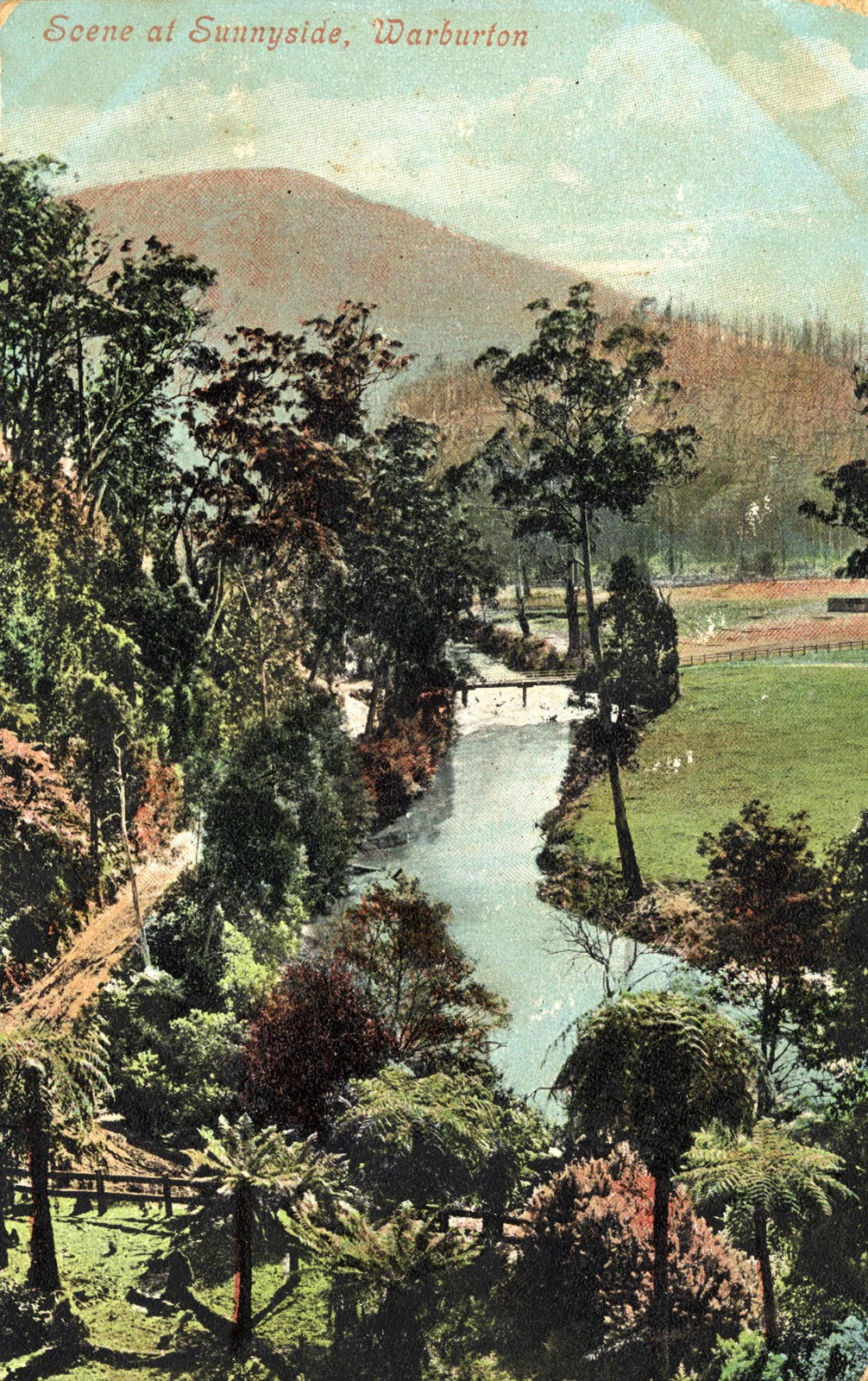
Scene at Sunnyside, Warburton
Images courtesy of Pictures Collection, State Library Victoria

== Exhibitions ==
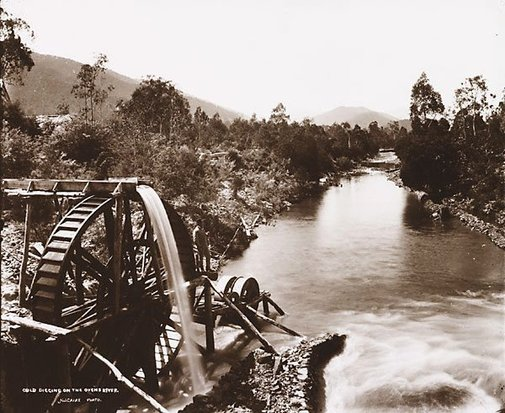
gelatin silver photograph, used in Art Gallery of New South Wales exhibition, Nicolas Caire.

Caire currently still has 5 artworks on display at the Art Gallery of New South Wales. With a previous exhibition being held at the same place consisting of 32 artworks on display, the exhibition was titled Nicholas Caire. At his Calcutta Exhibition Caire was awarded a prize for his images of the Melbourne Botanic Gardens.

List of exhibitions

- Nicholas John Caire: photographer 1837–1918, at Art Gallery of New South Wales, Sydney, NSW, 1 November 1980 – 14 December 1980.
- Melbourne Centennial International Exhibition, at Exhibition Building, Melbourne, Victoria, 1888–1889.
- Calcutta International Exhibition, at Calcutta, India, 1883–1884
- Melbourne International Exhibition, at Exhibition Building, Melbourne, 1880–1881.
- Sydney International Exhibition, at Garden Palace, Sydney, 1879–1880

== Death ==
Caire died on 13 February 1918. he was living in Armadale, Victoria, Australia at the time. He left behind many albums of his landscape work. A few of his negatives have been kept, unfortunately, most of his glass plates were cleaned off, to be used as glass for framing his pictures that he sold, because of the shortages in supplies during the First World War, framing was a major part of his business. This included many of his ones used in his major folio Gippsland Scenery, which is his best known work. He was survived by his wife, Louisa Master, his two sons and his four daughters, to one of whom he left his two cameras.
