= Electoral results for the district of Paddington (New South Wales) =

Election results for Paddington, New South Wales, Australia

Paddington, an electoral district of the Legislative Assembly in the Australian state of New South Wales, had two incarnations, from 1859 to 1920 and from 1927 to 1959.

Election	Member	Party						
1859	Daniel Cooper	None						
1860	John Sutherland	None						
1864	John Sutherland	None						
1869	John Sutherland	None						
1872	John Sutherland	None						
1874	John Sutherland	None						
1877	John Sutherland	None						
1880 by	William Hezlet	None	Member	Party				
1880	William Hezlet	None	William Trickett	None				
1882	Robert Butcher	None	William Trickett	None	Member	Party		
1885	Robert Butcher	None	William Trickett	None	John Neild	None		
1887	Alfred Allen	Free Trade	William Trickett	Free Trade	John Neild	Free Trade		
1888 by	Alfred Allen	Free Trade	William Allen	Protectionist	John Neild	Free Trade	Member	Party
1889	Alfred Allen	Free Trade	John Shepherd	Free Trade	Robert King	Free Trade	Jack Want	Free Trade
1891	Alfred Allen	Free Trade	James Marks	Free Trade	John Neild	Free Trade	Jack Want	Ind. Free Trade
1894	William Shipway	Free Trade						
1895	John Neild	Ind. Free Trade						
1898	John Neild	Free Trade						
1901	Charles Oakes	Liberal Reform						
1904	Charles Oakes	Liberal Reform						
1907	Charles Oakes	Liberal Reform						
1910	John Osborne	Labor						
1913	John Osborne	Labor						
1917	John Osborne	Labor						
May 1919 by	Lawrence O'Hara	Labor						
July 1919 by	John Birt	Labor						
Election	Member	Party						
1927	(Sir) Daniel Levy	Nationalist						
1930	Maurice O'Sullivan	Labor						
1932	Maurice O'Sullivan	Labor						
1935	Maurice O'Sullivan	Labor						
1938	Maurice O'Sullivan	Labor						
1941	Maurice O'Sullivan	Labor						
1944	Maurice O'Sullivan	Labor						
1947	Maurice O'Sullivan	Labor						
1950	Maurice O'Sullivan	Labor						
1953	Maurice O'Sullivan	Labor						
1956	Maurice O'Sullivan	Labor						

== Election results ==
=== Elections in the 1950s ===
==== 1956 ====
1956 New South Wales state election: Paddington
Party	Candidate	Votes	%	±%
Labor	Maurice O'Sullivan	12,570	66.4	−20.6
Liberal	Rodney Craigie	4,339	22.9	+22.9
Communist	Bill Brown	2,035	10.7	−2.3
Total formal votes		18,944	97.1	+4.4
Informal votes		573	2.9	−4.4
Turnout		19,517	91.4	+1.1
Two-party-preferred result
Labor	Maurice O'Sullivan	14,401	76.0	−11.0
Liberal	Rodney Craigie	4,543	24.0	+24.0
Labor hold		Swing	N/A	

==== 1953 ====
1953 New South Wales state election: Paddington
Party	Candidate	Votes	%	±%
Labor	Maurice O'Sullivan	17,596	87.0	
Communist	Bill Brown	2,641	13.0	
Total formal votes		20,237	92.7	
Informal votes		1,581	7.3	
Turnout		21,818	90.3	
Labor hold		Swing		

==== 1950 ====
1950 New South Wales state election: Paddington
Party	Candidate	Votes	%	±%
Labor	Maurice O'Sullivan	12,962	64.9	
Liberal	Bob Mutton	5,948	29.8	
Communist	Phyllis Johnson	1,051	5.3	
Total formal votes		19,961	98.4	
Informal votes		326	1.6	
Turnout		20,287	92.4	
Two-party-preferred result
Labor	Maurice O'Sullivan		69.0 (Note: Two party preferred vote was estimated.)	
Liberal	Bob Mutton		31.0	
Labor hold		Swing		

=== Elections in the 1940s ===
==== 1947 ====
1947 New South Wales state election: Paddington
Party	Candidate	Votes	%	±%
Labor	Maurice O'Sullivan	12,755	68.1	−31.9
Lang Labor	Owen Cahill	2,972	15.9	+15.9
Protestant Labour	Jonno Hodgson	1,634	8.7	+8.7
Communist	Phyllis Johnson	1,357	7.3	+7.3
Total formal votes		18,718	96.2	
Informal votes		739	3.8	
Turnout		19,457	93.3	
Labor hold		Swing	N/A	

- Preferences were not distributed.

==== 1944 ====
1944 New South Wales state election: Paddington
Party	Candidate	Votes	%	±%
Labor	Maurice O'Sullivan	unopposed		
Labor hold				

==== 1941 ====
1941 New South Wales state election: Paddington
Party	Candidate	Votes	%	±%
Labor	Maurice O'Sullivan	14,124	84.8	
State Labor	George Hales	2,529	15.2	
Total formal votes		16,653	96.2	
Informal votes		648	3.8	
Turnout		17,301	87.8	
Labor hold		Swing		

=== Elections in the 1930s ===
==== 1938 ====
1938 New South Wales state election: Paddington
Party	Candidate	Votes	%	±%
Labor	Maurice O'Sullivan	13,768	90.2	+23.7
Communist	Lance Sharkey	1,503	9.8	+1.2
Total formal votes		15,271	92.3	−3.8
Informal votes		1,266	7.7	+3.8
Turnout		16,537	92.9	−0.5
Labor hold		Swing	N/A	

==== 1935 ====
1935 New South Wales state election: Paddington
Party	Candidate	Votes	%	±%
Labor (NSW)	Maurice O'Sullivan	10,470	66.5	+8.5
Federal Labor	Leslie Kirkwood	3,931	25.0	+21.1
Communist	George Gowland	1,352	8.6	+6.6
Total formal votes		15,753	96.1	−0.4
Informal votes		635	3.9	+0.4
Turnout		16,388	93.4	−3.1
Labor (NSW) hold		Swing	N/A	

- Preferences were not distributed.

==== 1932 ====
1932 New South Wales state election: Paddington
Party	Candidate	Votes	%	±%
Labor (NSW)	Maurice O'Sullivan	9,061	58.0	−19.6
United Australia	Frank Graham	5,130	32.9	+12.6
Federal Labor	George Laughlan	614	3.9	+3.9
Ind. United Australia	Alfred Webb	501	3.2	+3.2
Communist	George Fleming	305	2.0	+0.3
Total formal votes		15,611	96.5	−1.0
Informal votes		567	3.5	+1.0
Turnout		16,178	96.5	+5.4
Labor (NSW) hold		Swing	N/A	

- Preferences were not distributed.

==== 1930 ====
1930 New South Wales state election: Paddington
Party	Candidate	Votes	%	±%
Labor	Maurice O'Sullivan	12,152	77.6	
Nationalist	Charles Robinson	3,231	20.6	
Communist	Bernard Richardson	272	1.7	
Total formal votes		15,655	97.5	
Informal votes		400	2.5	
Turnout		16,055	91.1	
Labor gain from Nationalist		Swing		

The sitting member was Daniel Levy (Nationalist) who successfully contested Woollahra

=== Elections in the 1920s ===
==== 1927 ====
1927 New South Wales state election: Paddington
Party	Candidate	Votes	%	±%
Nationalist	Daniel Levy	7,913	55.3	
Labor	William Bates	6,390	44.7	
Total formal votes		14,303	98.2	
Informal votes		259	1.8	
Turnout		14,562	81.6	
Nationalist win		(new seat)		

District recreated

==== 1920 - 1927 ====
District abolished

=== Elections in the 1910s ===
==== July 1919 by-election ====
July 1919 Paddington state by-election
Party	Candidate	Votes	%	±%
Labor	John Birt	2,678	88.1	+30.0
Socialist	Arthur Reardon	208	6.8	+6.8
Independent	James Jones	153	5.0	+4.6
Total formal votes		3,039	99.1	+0.4
Informal votes		28	0.9	−0.4
Turnout		3,067	26.9	−8.6
Labor hold		Swing	N/A	

The by-election was caused by the death of Lawrence O'Hara (Labor).

==== May 1919 by-election ====
1919 Paddington by-election Saturday 24 May
Party	Candidate	Votes	%	±%
Labor	Lawrence O'Hara	2,613	58.1	+1.0
Nationalist	William Harris	955	22.1	−20.8
Independent	James Thomson	869	19.3	
Independent	James Jones	19	0.4	
Total formal votes		4,496	98.7	−0.7
Informal votes		59	1.3	+0.7
Turnout		4,555	35.5 (Note: Estimate based on a roll of 12,842 at the 1917 election.)	−26.4
Labor hold		Swing	N/A	

The by-election was caused by the resignation of John Osborne (Labor) who had accepted an appointment to the Metropolitan Meat Industry Board.

==== 1917 ====
1917 New South Wales state election: Paddington
Party	Candidate	Votes	%	±%
Labor	John Osborne	4,512	57.1	+0.3
Nationalist	Thomas Eslick	3,391	42.9	+0.4
Total formal votes		7,903	99.4	+1.2
Informal votes		48	0.6	−1.2
Turnout		7,951	61.9	−4.1
Labor hold		Swing	+0.3	

==== 1913 ====
1913 New South Wales state election: Paddington
Party	Candidate	Votes	%	±%
Labor	John Osborne	4,676	56.8	
Liberal Reform	Reginald Harris	3,498	42.5	
Independent	Charles Carter	35	0.4	
Independent	James Jones	27	0.3	
Total formal votes		8,236	98.2	
Informal votes		154	1.8	
Turnout		8,390	66.0	
Labor hold				

==== 1910 ====
1910 New South Wales state election: Paddington
Party	Candidate	Votes	%	±%
Labour	John Osborne	3,783	50.8	+7.5
Liberal Reform	Charles Oakes (defeated)	3,472	46.6	−9.8
Independent Liberal	Francis Meacle	192	2.6	
Total formal votes		8,236	98.8	+0.8
Informal votes		89	1.2	−0.8
Turnout		7,536	70.3	+12.7
Labour gain from Liberal Reform				

=== Elections in the 1900s ===
==== 1907 ====
1907 New South Wales state election: Paddington
Party	Candidate	Votes	%	±%
Liberal Reform	Charles Oakes	2,978	56.4	
Labour	John Osborne	2,290	43.3	
Independent	Sidney Baird	17	0.3	
Total formal votes		5,285	98.0	
Informal votes		110	2.0	
Turnout		5,395	57.6	
Liberal Reform hold				

==== 1904 ====
1904 New South Wales state election: Paddington
Party	Candidate	Votes	%	±%
Liberal Reform	Charles Oakes	2,576	63.8	
Progressive	Thomas Bartholomew Curran	1,459	36.2	
Total formal votes		4,035	99.0	
Informal votes		43	1.1	
Turnout		4,078	46.2	
Liberal Reform hold				

Paddington lost part of the district to Darlinghurst and Woolahra and was expanded to include parts of Randwick and the abolished seat of Sydney-Bligh. The member for Paddington was Charles Oakes (Liberal Reform). The member for Randwick was David Storey (Liberal Reform) who successfully contested that seat. The member for Sydney-Bligh was Patrick Quinn (Progressive) who unsuccessfully contested King.

==== 1901 ====
1901 New South Wales state election: Paddington
Party	Candidate	Votes	%	±%
Liberal Reform	Charles Oakes	878	38.0	−15.0
Progressive	Thomas West	766	33.2	−13.0
Independent	Robert Usher	459	19.9	
Independent	Thomas Meagher	111	4.8	
Independent	Frederick Harper	97	4.2	
Total formal votes		2,311	99.5	+1.0
Informal votes		11	0.5	−1.0
Turnout		2,322	60.0	−1.5
Liberal Reform hold				

The sitting member was John Neild (Liberal Reform) who did not contest the election as he had been elected in March 1901 as a Senator for NSW.

=== Elections in the 1890s ===
==== 1898 ====
1898 New South Wales colonial election: Paddington
Party	Candidate	Votes	%	±%
Free Trade	John Neild	973	53.0	
National Federal	Thomas West	848	46.2	
Ind. Free Trade	Arthur Fletcher	15	0.8	
Total formal votes		1,836	98.6	
Informal votes		27	1.5	
Turnout		1,863	61.5	
Member changed to Free Trade from Ind. Free Trade				

==== 1895 ====
1895 New South Wales colonial election: Paddington
Party	Candidate	Votes	%	±%
Ind. Free Trade	John Neild	613	39.3	
Ind. Free Trade	Thomas West	476	30.5	
Free Trade	William Shipway	424	27.2	
Labour	Arthur Fletcher	47	3.0	
Total formal votes		1,560	99.1	
Informal votes		15	1.0	
Turnout		1,575	63.8	
Ind. Free Trade gain from Free Trade				

==== 1894 ====
1894 New South Wales colonial election: Paddington
Party	Candidate	Votes	%	±%
Free Trade	William Shipway	731	36.7	
Protectionist	John White	420	21.1	
Ind. Free Trade	Thomas West	390	19.6	
Labour	Stephen Byrne	309	15.5	
Ind. Free Trade	James Dillon	77	3.9	
Ind. Protectionist	Roger Kirby	38	1.9	
Ind. Free Trade	Maitland Whysall	15	0.8	
Ind. Protectionist	John Robinson	7	0.4	
Ind. Free Trade	Alfred Godfrey	4	0.2	
Ind. Free Trade	William Cowper	2	0.1	
Total formal votes		1,993	97.7	
Informal votes		48	2.4	
Turnout		2,041	81.4	
Free Trade win		(previously 4 members)		

==== 1891 ====
1891 New South Wales colonial election: Paddington Wednesday 17 June
Party	Candidate	Votes	%	±%
Free Trade	John Neild (elected 1)	3,275	14.7	
Ind. Free Trade	Jack Want (re-elected 2)	3,092	13.9	
Free Trade	James Marks (elected 3)	2,776	12.5	
Free Trade	Alfred Allen (re-elected 4)	2,698	12.1	
Labour	George Dyson	2,604	11.7	
Free Trade	Robert King (defeated)	2,076	9.3	
Free Trade	Charles Hellmrich	1,667	7.5	
Protectionist	William Martin	1,552	7.0	
Protectionist	William Allen	1,353	6.1	
Protectionist	James Roberts	1,162	5.2	
Total formal votes		22,255	99.1	
Informal votes		192	0.9	
Turnout		7,115	68.4	
Free Trade hold 3				
Member changed to Ind. Free Trade from Free Trade				

Jack Want whilst a Free Trader, did not support the Free Trade government of Sir Henry Parkes.

=== Elections in the 1880s ===
==== 1889 ====
1889 New South Wales colonial election: Paddington Saturday 2 February
Party	Candidate	Votes	%	±%
Free Trade	Jack Want (elected 1)	3,209	15.8	
Free Trade	Alfred Allen (elected 2)	2,949	14.5	
Free Trade	John Shepherd (elected 3)	2,520	12.4	
Free Trade	Robert King (elected 4)	2,220	10.9	
Protectionist	John McLaughlin	2,139	10.5	
Protectionist	William Allen	1,886	9.3	
Protectionist	John Neild	1,806	8.9	
Protectionist	John Walsh	1,798	8.9	
Protectionist	Robert Watkins	1,761	8.7	
Total formal votes		20,288	98.8	
Informal votes		245	1.2	
Turnout		5,670	61.0	
Free Trade hold 3 and win 1		(1 new seat)		

William Allen (Protectionist) had won a seat at a by-election in 1888 however was unable to retain it at this election. John Neild had been elected as a Free Trade member in 1887 however changed to the Protectionist party for this election.

==== 1888 by-election ====
1888 Paddington by-election Thursday 12 January
Party	Candidate	Votes	%	±%
Protectionist	William Allen (elected)	1,696	40.6	
Free Trade	Charles Hellmrich	1,682	40.2	
Free Trade	Edward Knapp	612	14.6	
Free Trade	Charles Cansdell	192	4.6	
Total formal votes		4,182	97.7	
Informal votes		98	2.3	
Turnout		4,280	51.1	
Protectionist gain from Free Trade				

William Trickett (Free Trade) was appointed to the Legislative Council.

==== 1887 ====
1887 New South Wales colonial election: Paddington Wednesday 9 February
Party	Candidate	Votes	%	±%
Free Trade	John Neild (re-elected 1)	2,601	22.3	
Free Trade	Alfred Allen (elected 2)	2,271	19.5	
Free Trade	William Trickett (re-elected 3)	2,230	19.1	
Free Trade	John McLaughlin	2,139	18.3	
Free Trade	John Shepherd (defeated)	1,630	14.0	
Protectionist	William Allen	715	6.1	
Independent	Edwin Bottrell	89	0.8	
Total formal votes		11,675	98.7	
Informal votes		151	1.3	
Turnout		5,159	66.6	

John Shepherd was the member for East Macquarie. John McLaughlin also unsuccessfully contested Gloucester.

==== 1885 ====
1885 New South Wales colonial election: Paddington Friday 16 October
Candidate	Votes	%
John Neild (elected 1)	2,033	20.6
William Trickett (re-elected 2)	1,628	16.5
Robert Butcher (re-elected 3)	1,514	15.3
John McLaughlin (defeated)	1,487	15.0
Alfred Allen	1,451	14.7
Charles Hellmrich	1,363	13.8
Charles Cansdell	418	4.2
Total formal votes	9,894	98.3
Informal votes	176	1.8
Turnout	4,356	64.7

==== 1882 ====
1882 New South Wales colonial election: Paddington Saturday 2 December
Candidate	Votes	%
William Trickett (re-elected 1)	1,602	36.6
Robert Butcher (elected 2)	1,061	24.2
John Neild	616	14.1
Ebenezer Vickery	573	13.1
William Allen	531	12.1
Total formal votes	4,383	97.3
Informal votes	120	2.7
Turnout	2,768	60.9

==== 1880 ====
1880 New South Wales colonial election: Paddington Thursday 18 November
Candidate	Votes	%
William Trickett (elected 1)	1,590	39.8
William Hezlet (re-elected 2)	1,212	30.4
William Allen	688	17.2
J Carroll	502	12.6
Total formal votes	3,992	98.9
Informal votes	46	1.1
Turnout	2,599	64.3
	(1 new seat)	

==== 1880 by-election ====
1880 Paddington by-election Friday 20 February
Candidate	Votes	%
William Hezlet (elected)	1,306	83.0
John Douglass	267	17.0
Total formal votes	1,573	98.3
Informal votes	27	1.7
Turnout	1,600	29.8

John Sutherland resigned.

=== Elections in the 1870s ===
==== 1877 ====
1877 New South Wales colonial election: Paddington Friday 26 October
Candidate	Votes	%
John Sutherland (re-elected)	unopposed	

==== 1874 ====
1874–75 New South Wales colonial election: Paddington Thursday 10 December 1874
Candidate	Votes	%
John Sutherland (re-elected)	unopposed	

==== 1872 ====
1872 New South Wales colonial election: Paddington Tuesday 20 February
Candidate	Votes	%
John Sutherland (re-elected)	unopposed	

=== Elections in the 1860s ===
==== 1869 ====
1869–70 New South Wales colonial election: Paddington Monday 6 December 1869
Candidate	Votes	%
John Sutherland (re-elected)	unopposed	

==== 1864 ====
1864–65 New South Wales colonial election: Paddington Wednesday 23 November 1864
Candidate	Votes	%
John Sutherland (re-elected)	650	67.9
Henry Mort	307	32.1
Total formal votes	957	100.0
Informal votes	0	0.0
Turnout	957	51.4

==== 1860 ====
1860 New South Wales colonial election: Paddington Saturday 8 December
Candidate	Votes	%
John Sutherland (elected)	unopposed	

=== Elections in the 1850s ===
==== 1859 ====
1859 New South Wales colonial election: Paddington Friday 10 June
Candidate	Votes	%
Daniel Cooper (re-elected)	528	52.0
William Windeyer	487	48.0
Total formal votes	1,015	100.0
Informal votes	0	0.0
Turnout	1,015	58.4
