= Electoral results for the district of Gundagai =

Election results for Gundagai, New South Wales, Australia

Gundagai, an electoral district of the Legislative Assembly in the Australian state of New South Wales was created in 1880 and abolished in 1904.

Election	Member	Party
1880	William Forster	None
1882 by	Bruce Smith	None
1882	Bruce Smith	None
1884 by	James Watson	None
1885	Jack Want	None
1887	Jack Want	Ind. Free Trade
1889	John Barnes	Protectionist
1891	John Barnes	Protectionist
1894	John Barnes	Protectionist
1895	John Barnes	Protectionist
1898	John Barnes	Protectionist
1901	John Barnes	Progressive

== Election results ==
=== Elections in the 1900s ===
==== 1901 ====
1901 New South Wales state election: Gundagai
Party	Candidate	Votes	%	±%
Progressive	John Barnes	785	39.4	−0.3
Independent	Walter Griffin	709	35.6	
Liberal Reform	John Miller	449	22.5	
Independent Liberal	James Cook	49	2.5	
Total formal votes		1,992	98.9	+0.8
Informal votes		22	1.1	−0.8
Turnout		2,014	69.5	4.0
Progressive hold				

=== Elections in the 1890s ===
==== 1898 ====
1898 New South Wales colonial election: Gundagai
Party	Candidate	Votes	%	±%
National Federal	John Barnes	591	39.7	
Independent Federalist	John Miller	511	34.3	
Independent Federalist	Waldo Sibthorpe	316	21.2	
Labour	William Matchett	70	4.7	
Total formal votes		1,488	98.1	
Informal votes		29	1.9	
Turnout		1,517	63.5	
National Federal hold				

==== 1895 ====
1895 New South Wales colonial election: Gundagai
Party	Candidate	Votes	%	±%
Protectionist	John Barnes	648	47.8	
Labour	John Day	464	34.2	
Ind. Protectionist	John Miller	244	18.0	
Total formal votes		1,356	99.1	
Informal votes		13	1.0	
Turnout		1,369	66.9	
Protectionist hold				

==== 1894 ====
1894 New South Wales colonial election: Gundagai
Party	Candidate	Votes	%	±%
Protectionist	John Barnes	699	46.3	
Independent Labour	Robert McCook	385	25.5	
Free Trade	Frederick Pinkstone	333	22.1	
Ind. Free Trade	Richard Ramsden	92	6.1	
Total formal votes		1,509	96.9	
Informal votes		48	3.1	
Turnout		1,557	77.8	
Protectionist hold				

==== 1891 ====
1891 New South Wales colonial election: Gundagai Saturday 27 June
Party	Candidate	Votes	%	±%
Protectionist	John Barnes (elected)	887	62.2	
Free Trade	Henry Deakin	540	37.8	
Total formal votes		1,427	97.6	
Informal votes		35	2.4	
Turnout		1,462	64.1	
Protectionist hold				

=== Elections in the 1880s ===
==== 1889 ====
1889 New South Wales colonial election: Gundagai Saturday 9 February
Party	Candidate	Votes	%	±%
Protectionist	John Barnes (elected)	686	54.1	
Protectionist	John McLaughlin	582	45.9	
Total formal votes		1,268	97.7	
Informal votes		30	2.3	
Turnout		1,298	58.4	
Protectionist gain from Ind. Free Trade				

The sitting member Jack Want (Independent Free Trade) did not contest the election, having been elected for Paddington on 2 February.

==== 1887 ====
1887 New South Wales colonial election: Gundagai Wednesday 16 February
Party	Candidate	Votes	%	±%
Ind. Free Trade	Jack Want (re-elected)	701	55.3	
Protectionist	Robert Newman	566	44.7	
Total formal votes		1,267	98.5	
Informal votes		19	1.5	
Turnout		1,286	49.2	

==== 1885 ====
1885 New South Wales colonial election: Gundagai Thursday 22 October
Candidate	Votes	%
Jack Want (elected)	943	62.8
Gerard Phillips	559	37.2
Total formal votes	1,502	98.7
Informal votes	20	1.3
Turnout	1,522	64.1

==== 1884 by-election ====
1884 Gundagai by-election Tuesday 22 April
Candidate	Votes	%
James Watson (elected)	558	50.3
Jack Want	552	49.7
Total formal votes	1,110	100.0
Informal votes	0	0.0
Turnout	1,110	61.1

Bruce Smith resigned.

==== 1882 ====
1882 New South Wales colonial election: Gundagai Wednesday 13 December
Candidate	Votes	%
Bruce Smith (re-elected)	588	62.9
Frederick Pinkstone	347	37.1
Total formal votes	935	98.3
Informal votes	16	1.7
Turnout	951	54.5

Bruce Smith had been successful at a by-election on 23 November 1882 however parliament was dissolved on the same day and he could not take his seat.

==== 1882 by-election ====
1882 Gundagai by-election Thursday 23 November
Candidate	Votes	%
Bruce Smith (elected)	380	70.5
George Wallace	92	17.1
Robert Barbour	67	12.4
Total formal votes	539	100.0
Informal votes	0	0.0
Turnout	539	30.9

William Forster died.

==== 1880 ====
1880 New South Wales colonial election: Gundagai Tuesday 30 November
Candidate	Votes	%
William Forster (elected)	600	52.2
Frederick Pinkstone	303	26.4
Samuel Swift	246	21.4
Total formal votes	1,149	98.5
Informal votes	17	1.5
Turnout	1,167	66.7
	(new seat)	

Gundagai partly replaced the abolished district of The Lachlan.
