= 1888 Paddington colonial by-election =

By-election in New South Wales, Australia

A by-election was held for the New South Wales Legislative Assembly electorate of Paddington on 12 January 1888 because William Trickett (Free Trade) was appointed to the Legislative Council.

== Dates ==
Date	Event
23 December 1887	William Trickett resigned.
28 December 1887	Writ of election issued by the Speaker of the Legislative Assembly.
30 December 1887	William Trickett appointed to Legislative Council.
9 January 1888	Nominations
12 January 1888	Polling day
14 January 1888	Return of writ

== Candidates ==
- William Allen (Protectionist) was a soap manufacturer. His brother Alfred was one of the sitting Free Trade members for Paddington
- Charles Cansdell (Free Trade) was a barrister, former Crown Prosecutor and Acting Judge of the District Court. This was his third and final time as a candidate, having previously been unsuccessful in 1877 (Windsor) and 1885 (Paddington).
- Charles Hellmrich (Free Trade) was an architect, alderman in the Paddington Municipal Council and former Mayor of Paddington. This was his second of three attempts for Paddington, having previously been unsuccessful in 1885 (Paddington). He stood unsuccessfully for a final time in 1891.
- Edward Knapp (Free Trade) was a surveyor and member of the Local Option League. This was the only time he stood for parliament.

== Result ==
1888 Paddington by-election Thursday 12 January
Party	Candidate	Votes	%	±%
Protectionist	William Allen (elected)	1,696	40.6	
Free Trade	Charles Hellmrich	1,682	40.2	
Free Trade	Edward Knapp	612	14.6	
Free Trade	Charles Cansdell	192	4.6	
Total formal votes		4,182	97.7	
Informal votes		98	2.3	
Turnout		4,280	51.1	
Protectionist gain from Free Trade				

== Aftermath ==
With a margin of just 14 votes, Charles Hellmrich challenged the result in the Elections and Qualifications Committee. The Committee consisted of 2 Free Trade members (Jacob Garrard and Albert Gould) and 3 Protectionist members (Joseph Palmer Abbott, Robert Smith and John See). The committee scrutinised the ballot papers and held that Allen was properly elected, finding that the true result was Allen 1,689, Hellmrich 1,653, Knapp 608 and Cansdell 191, formal 4,141, informal 114, total 4,255.

== See also ==
- Electoral results for the district of Paddington
- List of New South Wales state by-elections
