= 1880 Paddington colonial by-election =

By-election in New South Wales, Australia

A by-election was held for the New South Wales Legislative Assembly electorate of Paddington on 20 February 1880 because John Sutherland resigned when his company accepted a government contract to re-roll railway rails.

== Dates ==
Date	Event
3 February 1880	John Sutherland resigned.
4 February 1880	Writ of election issued by the Speaker of the Legislative Assembly.
18 February 1880	Nominations
20 February 1880	Polling day
25 February 1880	Return of writ

== Result ==
1880 Paddington by-election Friday 20 February
Candidate	Votes	%
William Hezlet (elected)	1,306	83.0
John Douglass	267	17.0
Total formal votes	1,573	98.3
Informal votes	27	1.7
Turnout	1,600	29.8

== See also ==
- Electoral results for the district of Paddington
- List of New South Wales state by-elections
