= 1884 Gundagai colonial by-election =

By-election in New South Wales, Australia

A by-election was held for the New South Wales Legislative Assembly electorate of Gundagai on 21 November 1884 because of the resignation of Bruce Smith, to return to Melbourne to run his father's business, WM Howard Smith and Sons Ltd.

== Dates ==
Date	Event
8 April 1884	Bruce Smith resigned.
9 April 1884	Writ of election issued by the Speaker of the Legislative Assembly.
18 April 1884	Nominations.
22 April 1884	Polling day
28 April 1884	Return of writ

== Candidates ==
- James Watson had been the member for Lachlan and then Young until his defeat at the 1882 election, and had been the Colonial Treasurer in the Parkes - Robertson coalition ministry.
- Jack Want was a barrister from Sydney and this was the first occasion he stood for parliament, although he would subsequently serve for 20 years in both houses of parliament, including three periods as Attorney General.

Want won the show of hands however a poll was demanded.

== Result ==
1884 Gundagai by-election Tuesday 22 April
Candidate	Votes	%
James Watson (elected)	558	50.3
Jack Want	552	49.7
Total formal votes	1,110	100.0
Informal votes	0	0.0
Turnout	1,110	61.1

Bruce Smith resigned.

== See also ==
- Electoral results for the district of Gundagai
- List of New South Wales state by-elections
