= Eliza Pottie =

Australian evangelist, pacifist and reformer (1837–1907)

- Born: Eliza Allen; 14 December 1837; Belfast, United Kingdom
- Died: 14 November 1907 (aged 69); Manly, New South Wales, Australia
- Burial place: Waverley Cemetery
- Citizenship: Australian
- Organization: Women's Christian Temperance Union
- Known for: social reform
- Movement: temperance, suffrage, women's rights
- Spouse: John Pottie
- Parents: William Bell Allen (father); Ruth Allen (mother)
- Relatives: William Johnston Allen (brother); Alfred Allen (brother)

Eliza Pottie (14 December 1837 – 14 November 1907) was an Australian social reformer, and a leader in women's organizations in New South Wales. She was involved in the founding of the Young Women's Christian Association in Sydney, the Ladies' Sanitation Association, and the Women's Christian Temperance Union (WCTU). She served as president of the Ladies Sanitation Association for nine years.

Pottie advocated for prison reform, supported orphanages, visited people in hospitals and institutions, and campaigned for women's suffrage. She was appointed to the Government Asylum Inquiry Board in 1886. A member of the Religious Society of Friends, she helped found the Quaker Relief Committee during the depression of 1893. In 1896, she attended the first National Council of Women New South Wales as a delegate for the WCTU. She died at her home in Manly in 1907.

== Biography ==
Eliza Allen was born in Belfast in Northern Ireland on 14 December 1837. Her father, William Bell Allen, voluntarily emigrated from Belfast to Australia, arriving on 11 March 1841. He established a factory for making candles and soap in Sydney and grew the business into one of the largest in the region. Allen became active in politics in New South Wales and was a leader in the protectionist movement.

In 1844, Eliza's mother, Ruth Allen, emigrated with her children to join her husband in Sydney. Eliza was the second child of four children and the only daughter. Her older brother, William Johnston Allen, became a successful businessman and sat in Parliament. He supported tariffs and the protectionist movement like his father. Her younger brother Alfred Allen, supported free market policies in opposition to his father and elder brother.

In 1862, Eliza married John Pottie, a Scottish immigrant who had a successful veterinary practice in Sydney. The couple had ten children together, four of whom died in infancy.

Eiza Pottie was a member of the Religious Society of Friends, like her mother. She wore simple dress, unadorned by ribbons or jewelry, as was the custom for Quakers.

Once her children were grown, Pottie took on leadership roles in various philanthropic and advocacy organizations. She and her husband were key leaders in the Sydney City Mission, established in 1862. She supported many causes for social reform. In addition to providing charitable visits to women in institutions, she advocated for changes in policy to improve conditions. She advocated for prison reform on the occasion of the country's centenary. She supported campaigns for reducing work hours and improving conditions for women shop assistants, a cause championed by her brother Alfred. She was a pacifist, who opposed violence of all forms. She believed in temperance and advocated for women's suffrage. In 1886, Pottie was appointed to the Government Asylum Inquiry Board, because of her concern for women who had been institutionalized.

She was a skilled speaker and writer, and often wrote poetry and letters to the editor, which were published in the local press.

Pottie died at home in Manly, New South Wales, on 14 November 1907. She is buried in Waverley Cemetery. Her husband died the following year, on 18 August 1908. Five of their children were still living at the time of their deaths, three sons and two daughters.

== Activism ==
Pottie helped found and lead several organizations that would prove to be influential in addressing social issues in New South Wales. She was one of a small group of women, convened by Mrs. Mary Jane Barker, who launched the first Young Women's Christian Association in Sydney in 1880. The mission of the Sydney YWCA was to provide lodging for women who had recently migrated to Australia, and who might arrive with little resources or support and be "vulnerable to exploitation." While a branch of the YWCA had been formed in Geelong earlier, it had lapsed. The Sydney branch became the first permanent YWCA branch in Australia.

Pottie also participated in the founding of the Ladies' Sanitary Association in New South Wales, which was part of a world-wide movement to teach women about good hygiene, nutrition, and how to keep their families healthy. Sanitation was an important issue of public health, because of the prevalence of contagious diseases, like tuberculosis, which caused high infant mortality as well as deaths in adults. As she lost four children of her own, Pottie was personally familiar with the heartbreak caused by high infant mortality rates. She was president of the Ladies' Sanitation Association for nine years, from 1892 to 1901.

She was also concerned for poor women's health and well-being, and served on a committee for the Sydney Female Mission Home, established in 1873. She also served in a volunteer capacity in support of children's orphanages.

Her concern for women's well being led Pottie to be an advocate for temperance. In 1882, she participated in the founding meeting of the Women's Christian Temperance Union in Sydney. This was the first branch of the W.C.T.U. to be created in Australia. Pottie became vice-president in 1883. She remained involved in the organization until her death in 1907. She served as head of the peace and arbitration committee, a cause that was important to her because of her religious faith.

An advocate for women's suffrage, Pottie became president of the newly formed Franchise League in 1890. The Franchise League was established by the W.C.T.U to organize support for women's suffrage, but it was short-lived; it collapsed because of its close link to the temperance movement which was not widely popular. After the organization's demise, Pottie became a founding member of the Womanhood Suffrage League, and served on the organization's council. She resigned over a disagreement with fellow league councilor Eliza Ashton, the wife of Julian Rossi Ashton, a well-known painter and art teacher. A writer for the Daily Telegraph, Eliza Ashton was outspoken in her criticism of the institution of marriage, launching a controversy that caused Pottie to withdraw from the suffrage organization.

In 1893, Australia experienced a financial and banking crisis that led to the worst depression in Australian history. Unemployment was widespread and families began to need assistance to survive. Relief societies were organized by faith groups to respond to the needs. Pottie helped establish the Quaker Relief Committee to assist the poor and unemployed in New South Wales.

On 26 June 1896, Pottie attended the founding meeting of the National Council of Women New South Wales held at the Sydney Town Hall. The council brought together various women's groups for the purpose of advocacy on issues related to women and children's welfare. Membership constituted of delegates from the various women's organizations in New South Wales. Pottie attended as the representative of the W.C.T.U. The idea of councils of women started in the United States with women's rights advocates. This led to the creation of the International Council of Women, linking women's advocacy globally. Margaret Windeyer, who attended the Chicago World's Fair exhibition in 1893, was introduced to the idea of regional councils of women at the exhibition. Upon her return to New South Wales, she initiated the formation of the first council in New South Wales, to which Pottie was a delegate. Lady Hampden, wife of New South Wales governor Henry Brand, known as Lord Hampden, took on the leadership of the NCWNSW after it was established.

== See also ==
- Temperance movement in Australia
- Women's suffrage in Australia
