= 1882 Gundagai colonial by-election =

By-election in New South Wales, Australia

A by-election was held for the New South Wales Legislative Assembly electorate of Gundagai on 23 November 1882 because of the death of William Forster. Parliament was dissolved on the same day as the polling and so Bruce Smith could not take his seat.

== Dates ==
Date	Event
30 October 1882	William Forster died.
2 November 1882	Writ of election issued by the Speaker of the Legislative Assembly.
17 November 1882	Nominations
23 November 1882	Polling day
5 December 1882	Return of writ

== Result ==
1882 Gundagai by-election Thursday 23 November
Candidate	Votes	%
Bruce Smith (elected)	380	70.5
George Wallace	92	17.1
Robert Barbour	67	12.4
Total formal votes	539	100.0
Informal votes	0	0.0
Turnout	539	30.9

== See also ==
- Electoral results for the district of Gundagai
- List of New South Wales state by-elections
