= James Marks =

James Marks may refer to:

- James Marks (architect) (1834–1915), Australian architect
- James Marks (politician) (1835–1907), Member of the New South Wales Legislative Assembly
