= John Neild =

Australian politician (1846–1911)

The Honourable John Neild
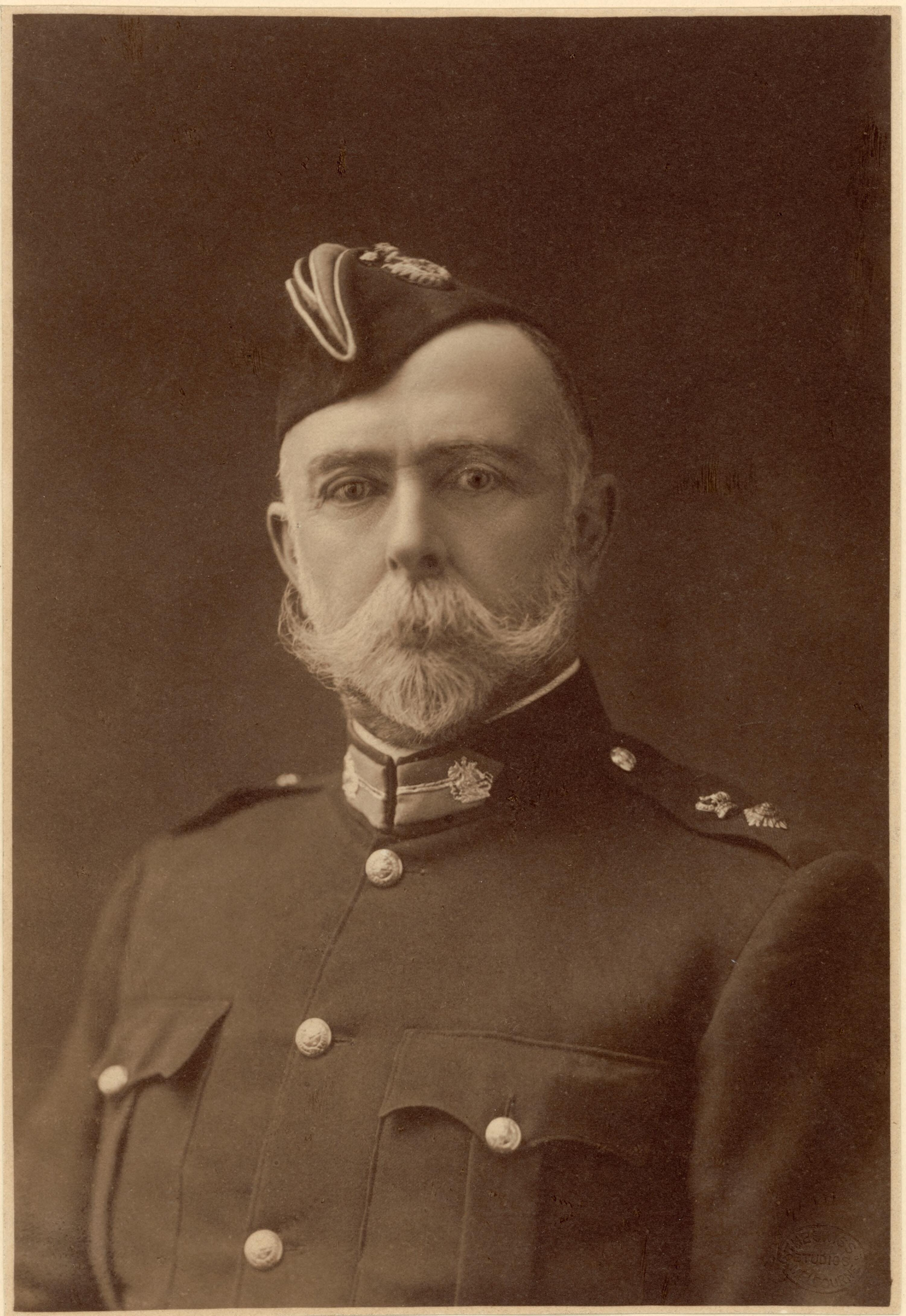
- Neild in 1901

Senator for New South Wales
- In office 29 March 1901 – 30 June 1910

Member for Paddington (New South Wales Legislative Assembly)
- In office 24 Jul 1895 – 11 June 1901
- In office 17 June 1891 – 25 June 1894
- In office 16 October 1885 – 19 January 1889

Personal details
- Born: 4 January 1846 Bristol, England
- Died: 8 March 1911 (aged 65) Woollahra, New South Wales
- Party: Free Trade (1887–1906); Anti-Socialist (1906–09); Liberal (1909–10)
- Spouse(s): Clara Matilda Gertrude Agnew (1868–79); Georgine Marie Louise Uhr (1880–1911)
- Occupation: Commission agent, insurance agent, alderman

John Cash Neild (4 January 1846 – 8 March 1911) was an Australian politician who served as the member for the Paddington electorate in the New South Wales Legislative Assembly for three intermittent periods between January 1885 and June 1901. After Federation Neild was elected as a senator representing New South Wales in the federal parliament, where he served until June 1910.

Although he spent his political career as a back-bencher, Neild had a prominent public profile due to his tenacious advocacy for causes he had taken up. In 1886 Neild, a supporter of free trade, delivered a tactical speech in the New South Wales parliament opposing customs duties of nearly nine hours duration, a feat for which he was dubbed 'Jawbone' Neild. In 1896 he published a book of verse, which became a source of satire due to Neild's liberal usage of archaic language. His dogged determination and financial problems led to the downfall of the George Reid's government in 1899, when it was revealed that Reid had been persuaded to advance an expenses payment to Neild, for a report into old-age pensions, without previous parliamentary consent. In 1896 Neild was one of the founders of a volunteer military corps called St. George's English Rifles, serving as its commanding officer from its inception until 1905. His dual roles of military officer and politician led to disputes with those in the higher chain of command (including an incident in 1899 when Neild was placed under 'open arrest' for insubordination). Neild was a frequent subject of satire by writers, cartoonists and his political opponents.

== Biography ==
=== Early life ===
John Cash Neild was born on 4 January 1846 in Bristol, England, the second son of John Cash Neild and Maria (née Greenwood). His father was a surgeon and his mother was the daughter of a banker.^{[A]}

In 1853 the family emigrated to New Zealand. They settled in the Taranaki region in the west of New Zealand's North Island. During the early stage of the Maori War at Taranaki, Dr. Neild was in charge of medical services to the troops at headquarters and the military hospital. Dr. Neild and his family left New Zealand for Australia to escape the violence, travelling to Sydney aboard the steamer Lord Worsley in July 1860.

John Neild (junior) was educated privately, by a tutor and attending private schools.

=== Business and local government ===
Neild was first employed at Montefiore, Joseph & Co., an importing firm. In October 1865 Neild commenced business as a broker and commission agent, located in the Lyons Buildings in George Street, Sydney. He was the sole agent in the Australian colonies for J. S. Fry and Sons of Bristol and London, manufacturers of chocolates and cocoas.

As a young man Neild was active in the Free Church of England (FCE). The FCE had separated from the established Church of England in the mid-1840s by evangelical low church clergy and congregations, in response to what were perceived as attempts to re-introduce traditional Catholic practices into Anglican liturgy and theology. In November 1866 Neild successfully applied to the Municipality of Cook at Camperdown, an inner western suburb of Sydney, for the use of a room in the council chambers for the purpose of holding divine worship by the FCE. In May 1867 he delivered a lecture at the Free Church of England premises in Woolloomooloo "on the subject of the Taranaki Volunteers, and the New Zealand War". The event was chaired by Captain R. Peel Raymond of the Sydney Volunteer Rifles.

On 29 October 1868 Neild married Clara Agnew, the eldest daughter of Rev. Philip Agnew, founder of the Free Church of England in New South Wales, and his wife Matilda. The marriage took place at the residence of the bride's father in Paddington.

In October 1869 Neild was listed as a member of the Society for the Abolition of Capital Punishment in New South Wales. By April 1870, working from his business premises in the Lyons Buildings, Neild became an agent for the Queen Insurance Company of England. He was also recorded as carrying on business as an actuary and accountant. During the 1870s Neild was the music and drama critic for the Catholic newspaper, the Evening Post.

John and Clara Neild initially lived at a residence named 'Caylus', in Ocean Street, Woollahra. The couple had one child, a boy named Philip, born in April 1872. Their son died on 19 June 1876 at their residence, "after a few hours' illness, of croup".

In September 1875 Neild was one of a group of "influential residents of Woollahra" who signed a requisition calling for the establishment of a volunteer fire brigade in the Borough of Woollahra. In January 1876 Neild was nominated to stand as an alderman in Piper Ward of the Borough of Woollahra. He was elected to the municipal council in 1876. In January 1878 Alderman Neild was appointed to act as the Council returning officer for elections to be held in the following month.

Clara Neild died on 16 September 1879 at her residence, 'Greycairn' in Edgcliff Road, Woollahra, "after a long illness".

Neild remarried on 19 February 1880 at St. Paul's Anglican Church in Redfern, to Georgine Uhr, the daughter of the late George Uhr, a former Sheriff of New South Wales. The couple had two children who survived to adulthood, a daughter born in May 1882 and a son born in December 1884.

=== Colonial politics ===
At the colonial election of December 1882 Neild stood as an independent candidate for the electorate of Paddington in the New South Wales Legislative Assembly. However, he failed a gain a seat in the two-member electorate, finishing in third place. Neild stood for a seat in the Paddington electorate again in the New South Wales general election of November 1885, this time a three-member electorate. On this occasion he was successful, finishing on top of the poll and elected to serve in the New South Wales Legislative Assembly alongside William J. Trickett and Robert Butcher, who had been the members for Paddington in the previous parliament. Neild made his first speech in the Legislative Assembly on 20 November 1885, delivering "a general condemnation" of the protectionist Dibbs government.

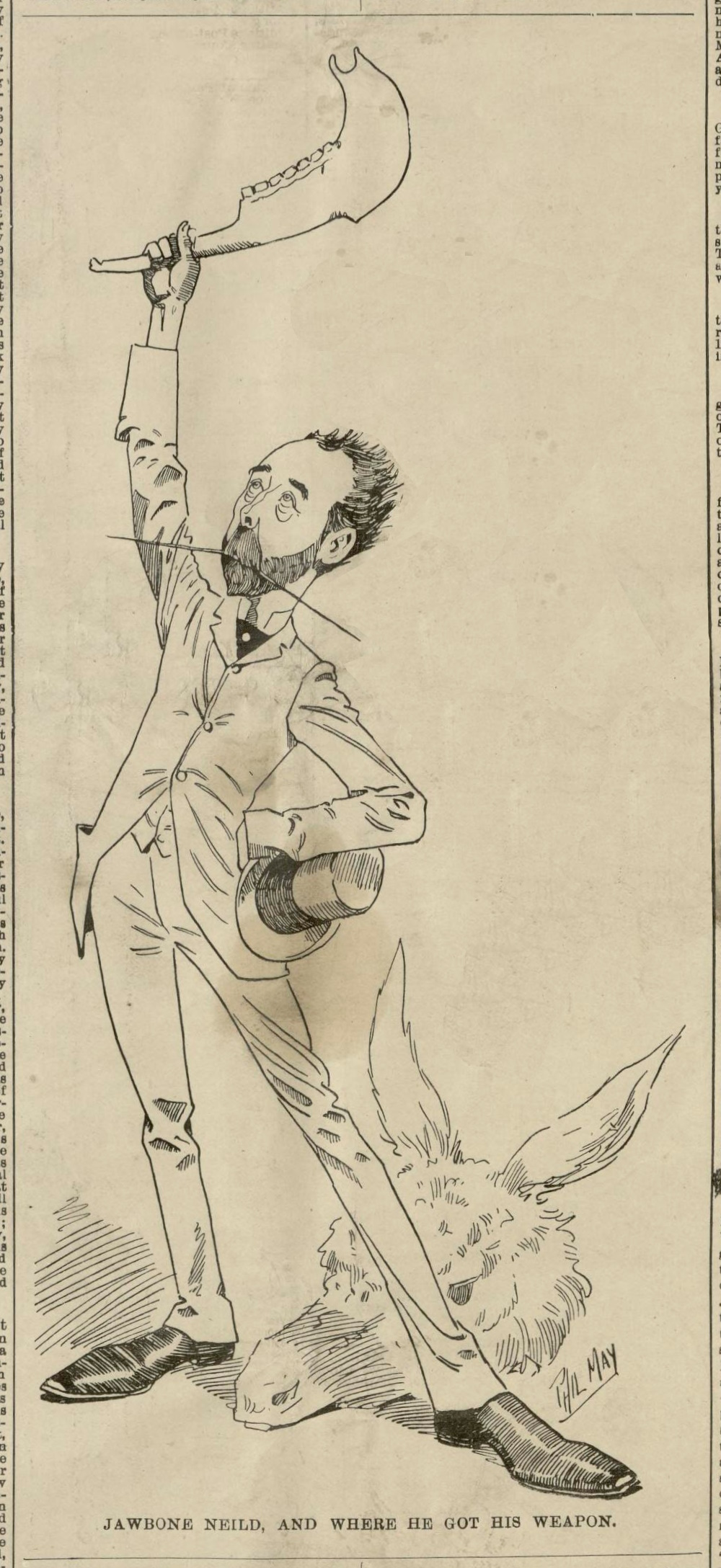
'Jawbone Neild, and Where He Got His Weapon' by Phil May (The Bulletin, 3 July 1886).

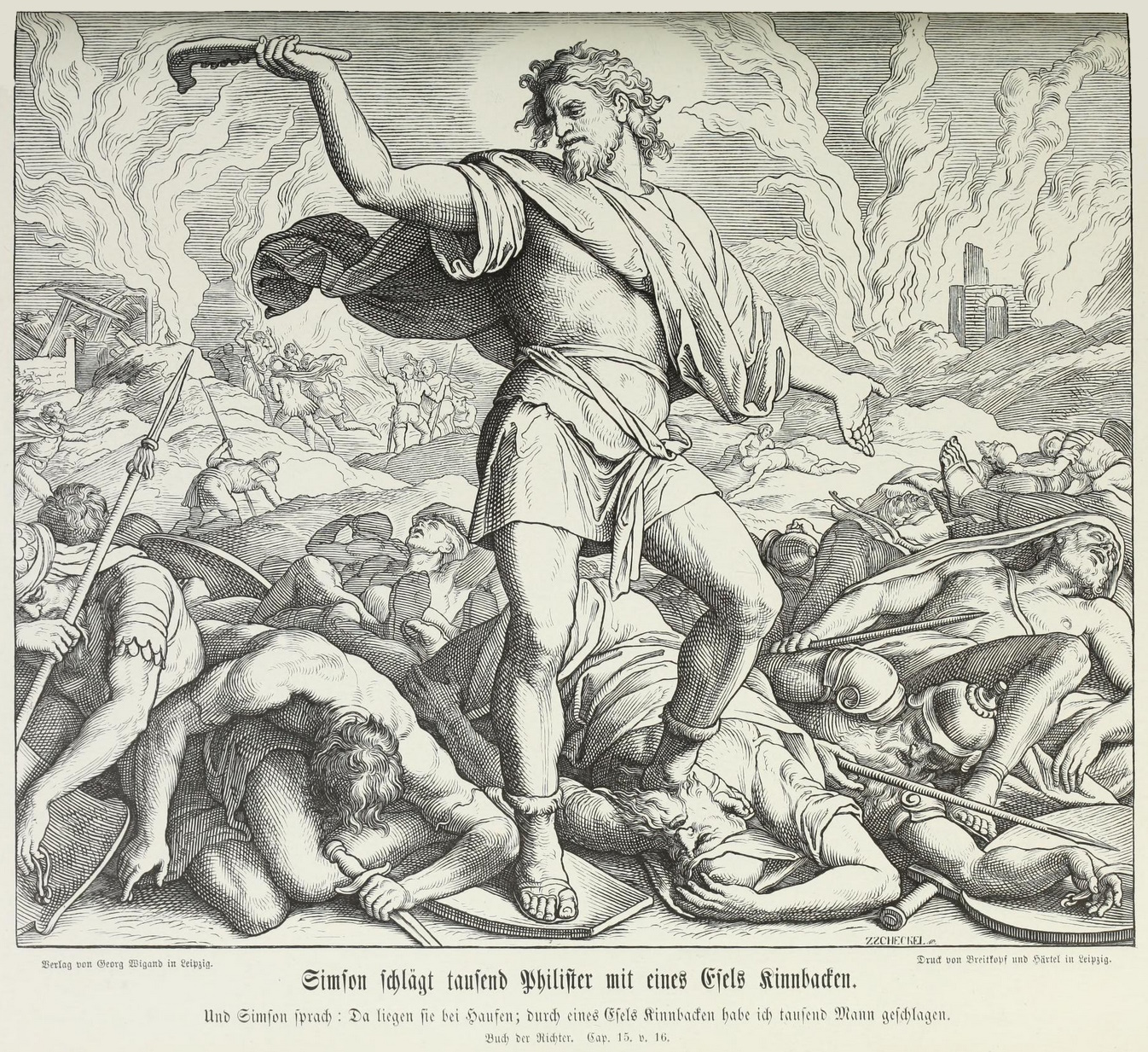
An engraving of Samson, after having slayed a thousand Philistines with the jawbone of an ass, by the artist Julius Schnorr von Carolsfeld (published in Die Bibel in Bildern, 1860).

For his first few years in parliament Neild was a member of the opposition, supporting free trade for the colony. In June 1886 he delivered a speech, during a debate in the Legislative Assembly on the Customs Duties Bill, that extended for nearly nine hours. On 18 June 1886 the leader of the opposition in the New South Wales parliament, Sir John Robertson, retired from public life on medical advice, in the process resigning from his seat for the Mudgee electorate. At a meeting of opposition members Sir Henry Parkes was unanimously chosen to replace him as leader. During the week preceding Robertson's resignation the parliament had been debating the Customs Duties Bill, after the Premier Patrick Jennings had moved for the second reading of the legislation proposing the introduction of ad valorem duties. Soon after being elected as leader of the free trade opposition, Parkes left Sydney to fulfill an existing commitment to visit the Manning River district. The parliamentary agenda had set aside 24 hours, beginning on the afternoon of Wednesday 23 June, for debate of the Customs Duties Bill, after which other parliamentary business was to take precedence. The opposition suspected Jennings' government were planning a division during this period to take advantage of Parkes' absence.

It had been an open secret that the opposition was planning to make a prolonged speech to prevent a vote on the bill when Neild rose to begin his speech soon after nine o'clock in the evening of 23 June. He continued throughout the night until ten minutes to seven the following morning (excluding an forty-five minute adjournment commencing at four in the morning). His speech was confined to the question of custom duties and was delivered "from an ultra free-trade point of view". For the duration of his speech Neild was called to order by the Speaker on only two occasions, "once for irrelevancy, and once for repeating himself". During his address Neild was "loudly cheered and encouraged by his colleagues on the Opposition side... and received an ovation from them at the conclusion". When the New South Wales Hansard for the week was published, Neild's speech took up 29 of the 165 pages.

Neild's nine-hour parliamentary speech proved to be one of the defining events of his life. In the following weeks journalists working for The Bulletin magazine and the Catholic newspaper The Freeman's Journal dubbed him 'Jawbone' Neild, a nickname he was known by for the remainder of his life. The Bulletin cartoonists Phil May and Livingston Hopkins added a visual element to the label by depicting Neild brandishing the jawbone of an ass, an image referencing the Biblical text describing the killing of a thousand Philistines by Samson, using a donkey's jawbone as a weapon.

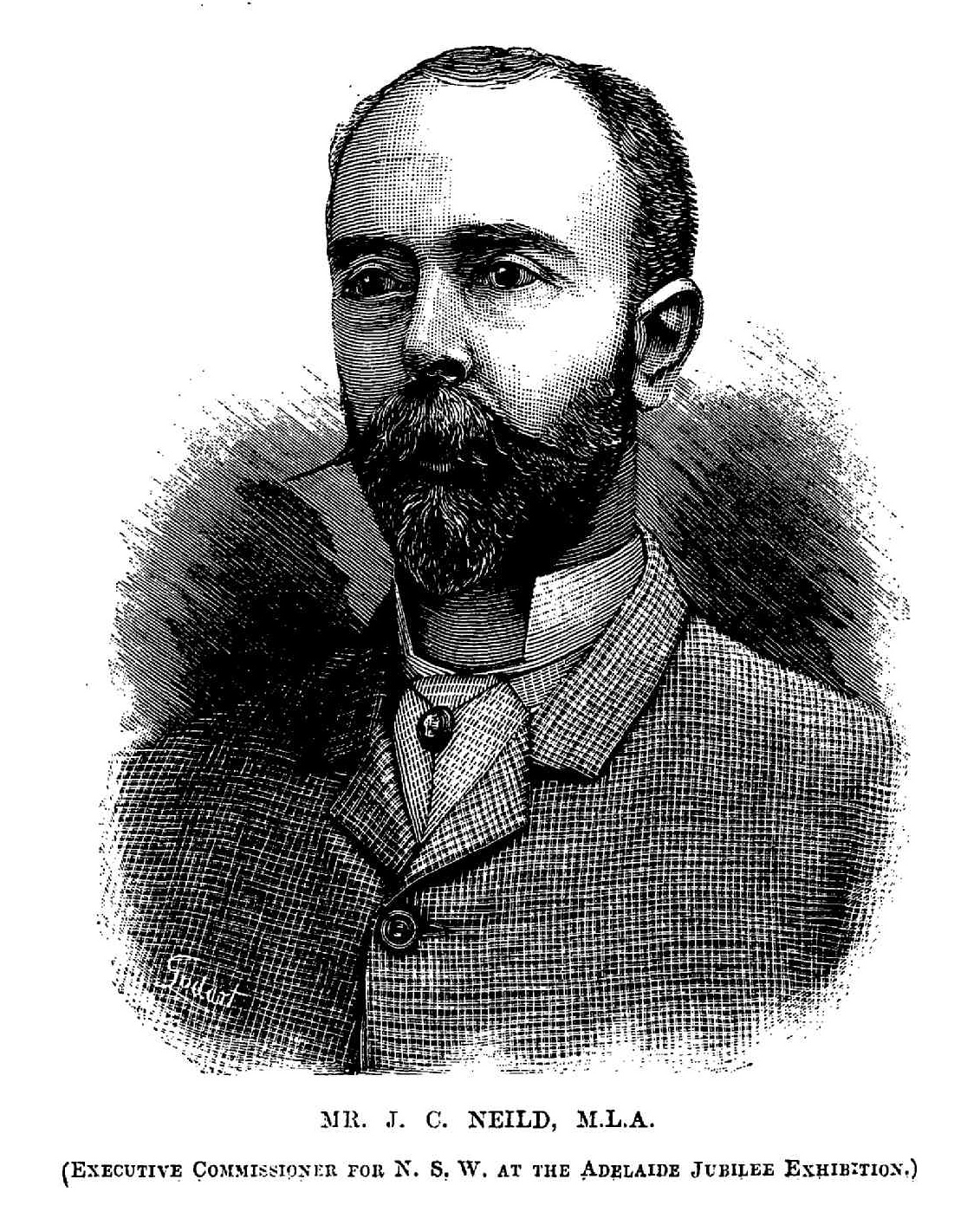
Engraving illustration of John C. Neild by Frank Godart, published in The Sydney Mail, 30 July 1887.

In January 1887 Henry Parkes became Premier of New South Wales following the resignation of the protectionist Patrick Jennings, brought about by political and personal differences with the Colonial Secretary George Dibbs. Parkes selected a ministry prior to contesting a general election in February, but did not offer Neild a role. At a meeting with Neild, Parkes "made certain explanations to him and gave him certain assurances"; for his part Neild claimed that "the explanations were unnecessary [as] he in no way sought office". Although generally supporting the Parkes administration Neild chose to sit on the cross-benches in parliament. In February 1887 Neild was described in the following terms: "Celebrated for the length of his oratory and of his moustache, although his vanity is more extensive than either; a man of great expectations, and probably the greatest disappointment of his life was that he was not asked by Sir Henry Parkes to take office". In April 1887 he was recorded as "a freetrader, and gives an independent support to the present Ministry".

In 1887 Neild was appointed as executive commissioner for New South Wales at the Adelaide Jubilee International Exhibition, which opened in June that year. The New South Wales display featured a "triumphal arch" and a "magnificent array" of minerals and timbers, agricultural products and "diversified manufactures", displaying "the magnitude and variety" of the colony's economic resources. In the lead-up to the opening, Neild's seat in the Legislative Assembly was challenged on the ground that he held an office of profit under the Crown as commissioner for the exhibition. The question was referred to the Committee of Elections and Qualifications which found no impropriety, with all expenditure of public funds being confined to exhibition-related expenses.

In April 1888 a simmering animosity between Neild and Sir Henry Parkes, the New South Wales premier, came to the fore. Neild had made a speech in parliament, sharply criticising the government's financial management, and Parkes reacted by relating an anecdote about a pig-farmer: "One day hearing a considerable amount of squalling, and seeking to discover the cause for the noise, he found one little pig (a little porker) crying because he had not a teat to suck". During a subsequent debate on the Supply Bill Neild responded to Parkes comments, pointing out that "those who had got the teats were on the Government benches". He claimed the premier "had reversed nature, because while the litter sucked the sow, Sir Henry Parkes sucked his litter" (to which comments the opposition reacted with loud cheers).

Neild had remained an alderman of the Woollahra Municipal Council after being elected as a member of the Legislative Assembly. In June 1888, upon the resignation of William Trickett, Neild was unanimously elected to the office of mayor of Woollahra.

In the New South Wales general election of February 1889 Neild was defeated for a seat to represent the four-member Paddington electorate, finishing seventh from a field of nine candidates. In the lead-up to the election Neild had suffered from a fractured leg.

Neild remained as mayor of Woollahra until February 1890 when Thomas Magney was elected in his place. Neild did not attend any subsequent council meetings and in June 1890 he sent a letter tendering his resignation as alderman.

Neild had temporarily moved from Sydney to Gosford after February 1890, where he was working as an auctioneer. In June 1890 a sequestration petition was granted declaring Neild bankrupt. His liabilities were estimated to be approximately ten thousand pounds, against which there were assets of about six thousand pounds. Neild's financial problems were related to his engagement in "a large amount of litigation" over a ten-year period with various persons and the Lion Fire Insurance Company, including at least one appeal to the Privy Council in Britain.^{[B]}

Neild had joined the Loyal Orange Institution of New South Wales in 1883, an affiliated lodge of the Protestant fraternal order based in Northern Ireland. In February 1891 he was elected as the Right Worshipful Grand Master of the institution.

Neild was re-elected as a member of the four-member Paddington electorate in the New South Wales election of June 1891. Soon after his return to parliament Neild introduced the Children's Protection Bill (No 2), an effort to prevent 'baby farming' by regulating those who took children into their care for payment. His bill passed the Legislative Assembly in August 1891 and the Legislative Council in March 1892.

Neild also introduced a bill for divorce reform, extending the grounds for dissolution of marriage to include desertion, habitual drunkenness, assault or imprisonment for at least seven years. Efforts to introduce these measures in New South Wales had begun in 1886 when Sir Alfred Stephen, then a member of the Legislative Council, championed the Divorce Extension Act, which passed both houses of parliament but was refused royal assent. Stephen continued to re-introduce the bill in successive sessions, encountering determined opposition until it lapsed in 1890. Stephen resigned from the Legislative Council in October 1890. In August 1891 Neild gave notice of his intention to introduce a bill for the amendment and extension of divorce laws. Neild's Divorce Act Extension and Amendment Bill was passed in the Legislative Assembly in February 1892. The legislation was passed by the Legislative Council in March and became law after its assent by the Governor in August 1892.

=== Politics, the military and verse ===
During an address on the occasion of the annual Orangemens' Day celebration on 12 July 1894 at the Loyal Orange lodge, Grand Master Neild referred to the illness and expected death of Pope Leo XIII and called upon Protestants to "unite with their brethren of the Roman Catholic Church in praying... that the physical sufferings of his Holiness might be few". It was reported that "Mr. Neild's remarks were received in silence". Less than a week after Neild's controversial remarks to the Orangemen, the New South Wales general election was held. Neild had decided to stand for the electorate of Woollahra, but when the votes were cast on 17 July he was defeated by Adrian Knox, another Free Trade candidate. In August 1894 Neild resigned from the Loyal Orange Institution of New South Wales, both as Grand Master and as a member of the lodge. A writer for the Freeman's Journal claimed that Neild had "tried to use the Lodge as a political ladder, while posing publicly as a reformer of the old fierce Orange spirit", adding that his "formal resignation of both the Grandmastership and membership of the Orange Lodge is a curious anti-climax to the political dreams both of Grand Master and Lodge".

At the New South Wales general election in July 1895 Neild was elected as the member for Paddington (by then a one-member electorate), polling first against two other free-trade candidates (including the previous member, William Shipway).

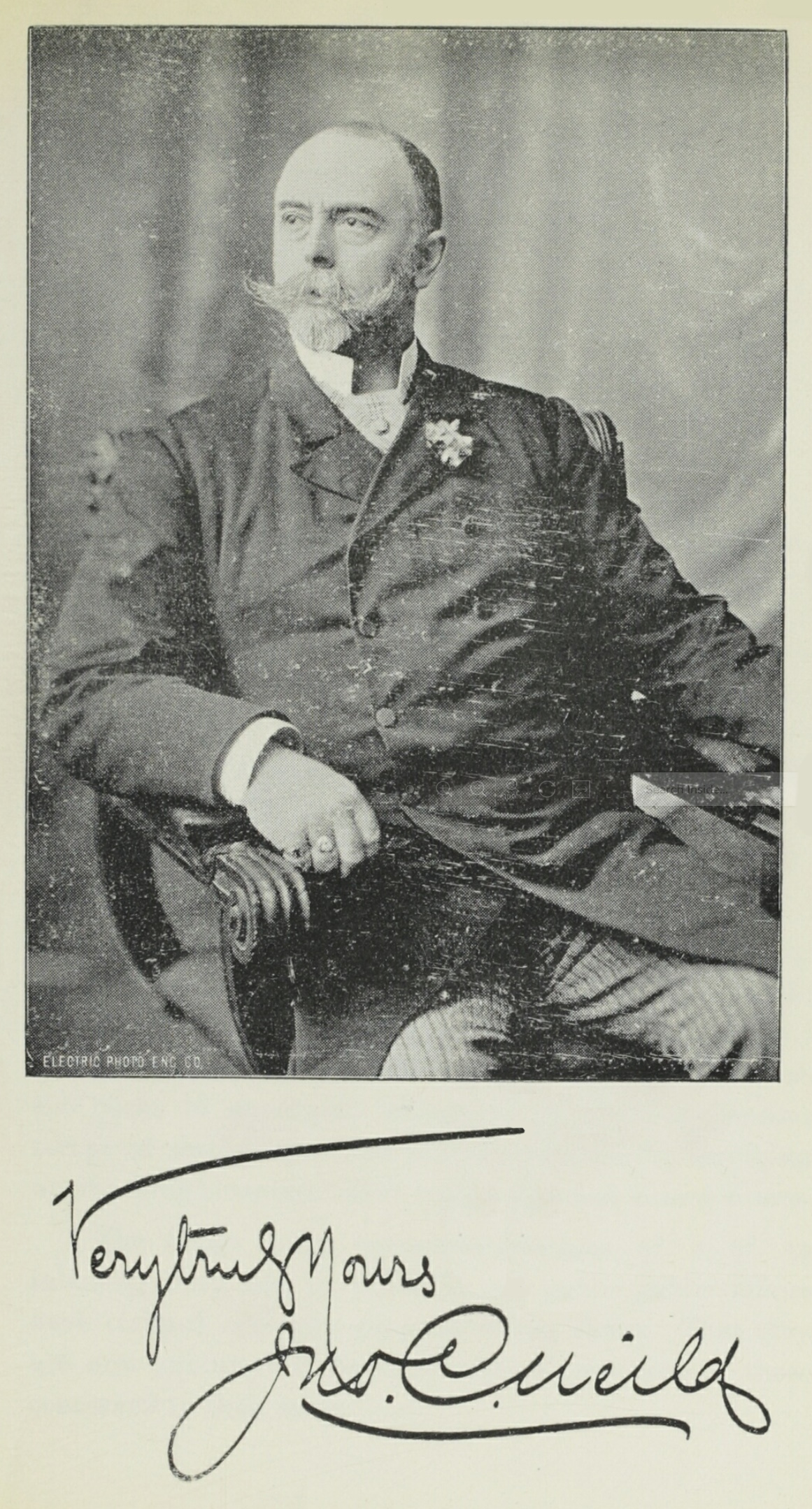
Photograph and signature of John C. Neild, published in Songs 'Neath the Southern Cross (1896).

In February 1896 an anthology of Neild's poetry was published, titled Songs 'Neath the Southern Cross. In the book's preface Neild claimed the contents "were not written with a view to publication", but that "the composition of the Songs afforded occupation to an active mind, in what might otherwise have been idle moments – in train, tram and omnibus, and at other odd times", adding: "The only opportunity for anything approaching sustained effort was during occasional illness". A review in the Sydney Morning Herald was luke-warm, describing Neild's professed effort "to reproduce the vernacular and incidents of bush life" as "praiseworthy", but "where performance falls short in this respect, something must be set down to the credit of a good intention". The writer quoted extracts from the volume, including the line: "Eftsoons a nocent watersprout would rise" (used as an example of the poet's "certain command of a pretty quaintness of phrase, quite his own"). Neild's frequent employment of anachronistic words and phrases seemed to be at odds with his claim in the 'Preface': "In this volume it is sought to interest by incident and action, and by a faithful portrayal of human passions, rather than to excite astonishment by dexterity of verbal manipulation". A review of Songs 'Neath the Southern Cross in The Bulletin was more critical, describing Neild as a "mechanically accurate person" and "obviously not a poet", with "no fire within him, no energy, nothing that anyone will ever want to remember". In describing Neild's liberal usage of archaic language the reviewer makes the comment: "In this painfully new land, old, disused statements like 'eftsoons' seem out of place". The writer speculates that possibly "the author couldn't sleep till he got this volume off his chest, and, if so, he did well to publish it", adding: "Suppressed poetry is bad for the health at all times". The reviewer in Sydney's Evening News noted the author's claim that his verse was not written "with a view to publication" and comments: "The obvious query then is why on earth did Mr. Neild publish?".

In late March 1896 Neild responded to critics of his poetry by holding a public lecture, during which he fulminated against critics across the breadth of British literary history before expressing his grievances in "sweeping diatribes" about critics of his own poetry. During his remarks he also lambasted the work of contemporary Australian poets such as A. B. 'Banjo' Paterson, Henry Lawson and John Farrell. The writer of an article about the event in The Australian Star, described Neild in the following terms: "He is tall and rather stalwart, with a military aspect, a moist mouth and a limpid eye, and might be a militia major in full practice if he were not a poet and a politician". Neild's performance at the public lecture was described as an "exhibition of envy, hatred, malice and vulgarity".

In May 1896 Neild was one of a group of men who initiated the establishment of a volunteer military corps known as 'St. George's English Rifles'. In June 1896 the St. George's English Rifles was incorporated into the 5th Union Volunteer Infantry Regiment, together with the long-established Scottish Rifles and the Irish Rifles (formed in November 1895). The official sanction allowed for the volunteer corps to be supplied "with arms and accoutrements, and an annual capitation allowance at the rate of £3 per head for the purpose of providing uniform, &c.". The St. George's Rifles initially consisted of a three companies, with Neild appointed to the rank of major and commanding officer in August 1896 (despite his lack of previous military experience). The dress uniform of the corps was a scarlet tunic (with buff facings on the collar, shoulder straps and cuffs) and blue trousers. The field service uniform included a brown jacket with buff facings and scarlet trimmings. In June 1897 the St. George's Rifles was increased to six companies. In February 1898 the corps was gazetted as the 7th Volunteer Infantry Regiment (St. George's Rifles) and in the following April Neild was promoted to the rank of lieutenant-colonel. The regimental march of the St. George's Rifles was an arrangement of 'The British Grenadiers' and 'The English Gentleman'. St. George's Day (23 April) was celebrated annually (on the nearest Sunday to that day) by a regimental parade and church attendance at St. James' church in King Street.

After Neild's return to the Legislative Assembly in 1895, both he and Edward O'Sullivan (the member for Queanbeyan), began to agitate for old-age pensions. In June 1896 Neild moved "for the substitution of old age pensions or outdoor relief... for the present asylum system". During the ensuing debate O'Sullivan drew a distinction between an old-age pension (as "a right which every man and woman... can claim at the hands of the State they have served") and "outdoor relief" which was a form of charity and served to "pauperise the idea". O'Sullivan successfully moved an amendment to Neild's motion, to refer the matter of "poor law reconstruction" to a select committee. Both men contributed to the Select Committee on Old-Age Pensions, though Neild maintained more of a public profile on the issue. In August 1896, prior to the final report of the select committee, Neild travelled to England. His trip was on private business, but in addition he had been given a "roving commission" by the premier George Reid to inquire into and report upon systems of old-age pensions in Britain and Europe. Prior to his departure, in a reply to a question in parliament, Reid stated that "no remuneration was to be given and no expenses were to be paid in connection with the undertaking". The committee's final report, primarily the work of O'Sullivan, was presented to parliament in September 1896 (but not adopted). It argued for the liberal position that citizens had a statutory right to support in old age, explicitly stating that pensions were to be paid by the State as a right, and not as charity. Both Neild and O'Sullivan had argued for gender equality in the old-age pension, which became a feature of the eventual scheme.

In November 1896, while Neild was in London, the Freeman's Journal drew attention to a description of him in London's The Times as the "Commissioner for Charities for New South Wales, who has been empowered to visit Europe and report upon the questions of old-age pensions and the distribution of charitable relief". In a mocking tone the Journal article claimed that "the Premier has twice explained in the House that... [Neild] has no authority from the Government to inquire into anything". Neild returned to Australia in late March 1897. Upon his arrival in Sydney Neild initiated a libel action against the Freeman's Journal, claiming damages of two thousand pounds relating to the November 1896 article, which he contended "did him serious injury in England".

=== Political crisis ===
In June 1898 Neild was seriously ill, suffering from bronchitis, gastritis and measles, to the extent that attending doctors "held out little hopes for his recovery". Neild's voluminous report (of over 500 pages), detailing the systems of old-age pensions charitable relief and State insurance in Britain and Europe, was published in November 1898. The Premier George Reid later wrote that he had expected Neild to produce a comparatively small document that could be printed as a parliamentary paper. In reply to a question shortly after its publication, parliament was assured "that no payments had been made in connection with the pension report", though Reid later claimed that he planned to place an amount of £600 on the Estimates for Neild's out-of-pocket expenses and personal labour (which would have required parliamentary approval). In January 1899 Neild received an advance payment of £350 from Treasury funds. The payment was notated "Charities, old-age pensions, etc." without reference to whom it had been paid. It was later revealed that Neild had approached Reid to ask for the payment for his report, explaining that his life insurance policy was "about to be forfeited, and he was in absolute pecuniary distress". Reid "honestly believed" that Neild "had done work which was worth many hundreds of pounds to the State" and made the payment, "taking all risks" and fully aware he had previously assured parliament that no remuneration would be made.

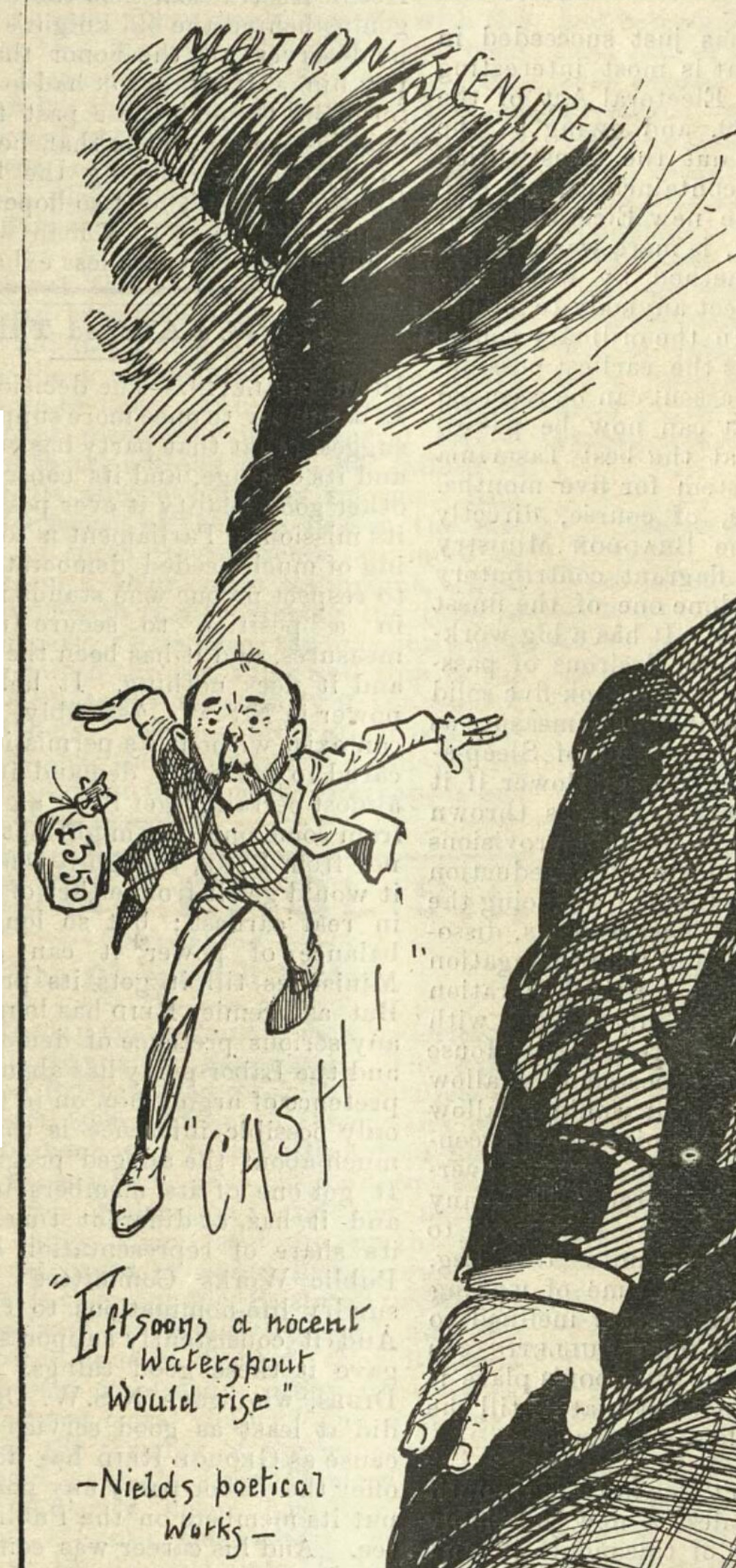
Neild's "waterspout" as a censure motion by Livingston Hopkins ('Hop') (The Bulletin, 9 September 1899).

The St. George's Rifles (7th Volunteer Infantry Regiment) took part in Easter manoeuvres in 1899, carried out over four days. On Easter Monday, 3 April, during an 'engagement' between opposing forces in the vicinity of the Cook's River at Canterbury and surrounding suburbs, the St. George's Rifles were part of the defending forces. During a mock battle at Kingsgrove three companies of the volunteer regiment were captured by the men of the 2nd Regiment. An account of the manoeuvres reported that "their commanding officer, Colonel Neild, was discovered later on careering wildly about on his charger in search of his three missing companies". Towards the end of the 'battle' Neild was described as being "cooped up in a paddock" with the remnants of his regiment, "hardly knowing what was expected of him". Afterwards Neild wrote a number of letters to the press setting forth his version of the part he had played as the commanding officer on the day. In his series of letters Neild then turned his critical attention to lieutenant-colonel Montague W. Bayly, the officer commanding the volunteer forces and Neild's immediate superior officer. His letters were addressed to Bayly, but also adversely criticised the action of major-general French and other officers of the headquarters staff. Bayly reacted by ordering that Neild be placed under 'open arrest', charged with insubordination, and suspending him from military duties. A staff sergeant arrived at Neild's residence on the morning of 15 April 1899 and placed him under open arrest.^{[C]} At first Neild took a defiant attitude, pointing out that he had written the letters as a citizen and member of parliament, signed as "J. C. Neild". He claimed the right, when not actually on military duty, to write letters to newspapers criticising the actions of military authorities (a right denied to a regular soldier). Eventually, however, Neild gave an "unqualified and unreserved expression of regret and admission of error". The New South Wales cabinet met about the matter, but decided no further punishment was warranted, though "in order to preserve discipline and prevent insubordination, any future case will be dealt with more severely". A series of military inquiries were held in 1899 and 1900, investigating the affairs of the 7th Regiment as well as a dispute between Neild and the regiment's second-in-command Major John Waine. Although Neild's decisions were subjected to criticism he remained in command of the St. George's Rifles.

In August 1899 Alfred Edden, the member for Kahibah, asked the Colonial Treasurer "whether anything had been paid to anybody in connection with the report on old age pensions". He was then informed of the payment of £350 to Neild "towards the expenses incurred by him in England and on the Continent of Europe in obtaining information for his report". After debate in the Legislative Assembly it was determined that the Elections and Qualifications Committee should investigate the matter. Several days later Neild repaid the money to Treasury.

The committee report on the matter was released on 30 August 1899. It exonerated Neild by finding he had not accepted an office of profit, prohibited for members under the terms of the State constitution, but also pointed out that accepting payment from the Government, without previous parliamentary consent, "is constitutionally dangerous, and should be discontinued". Later that day the opposition leader William Lyne moved a motion of censure in Reid's government, claiming that it "does not possess the confidence of this House". During his speech Lyne made it clear that impetus for the censure motion was the Government's payment to Neild. After extensive debate and political manoeuvering, the 'no confidence' motion in the Reid government passed on 7 September. An article in the Australian Town and Country Journal lamented the government's decline over such a small amount of money: "The Reid Government after five years of prosperity has fallen upon evil days, and has come to grief over a little item of £350 advanced to Mr. Neild, the member for Paddington, for expenses in connection with his old-age pensions report".

Legislation to introduce the old-age pension in New South Wales was eventually passed in late 1900 by William Lyne's liberal government, which included Edward O'Sullivan as a minister. The New South Wales old-age pension served as the model for the national system passed by the Commonwealth parliament in 1908 (which superseded State laws).

=== Senate ===
After Federation Neild had intended to run for the electorate of Wentworth at the first federal election, but after another free-trade candidate, William McMillan, nominated as a candidate Neild was persuaded to become a Free Trade Party candidate for the Senate. Neild was one of five Free Trade candidates elected to the Senate for New South Wales (fifth position in a quota of six seats). Senator Neild wore the scarlet dress uniform of the St. George's Rifles at the opening of the first Australian parliament, in a ceremony on 9 May 1901 in the western annexe of the Royal Exhibition Building in Melbourne.

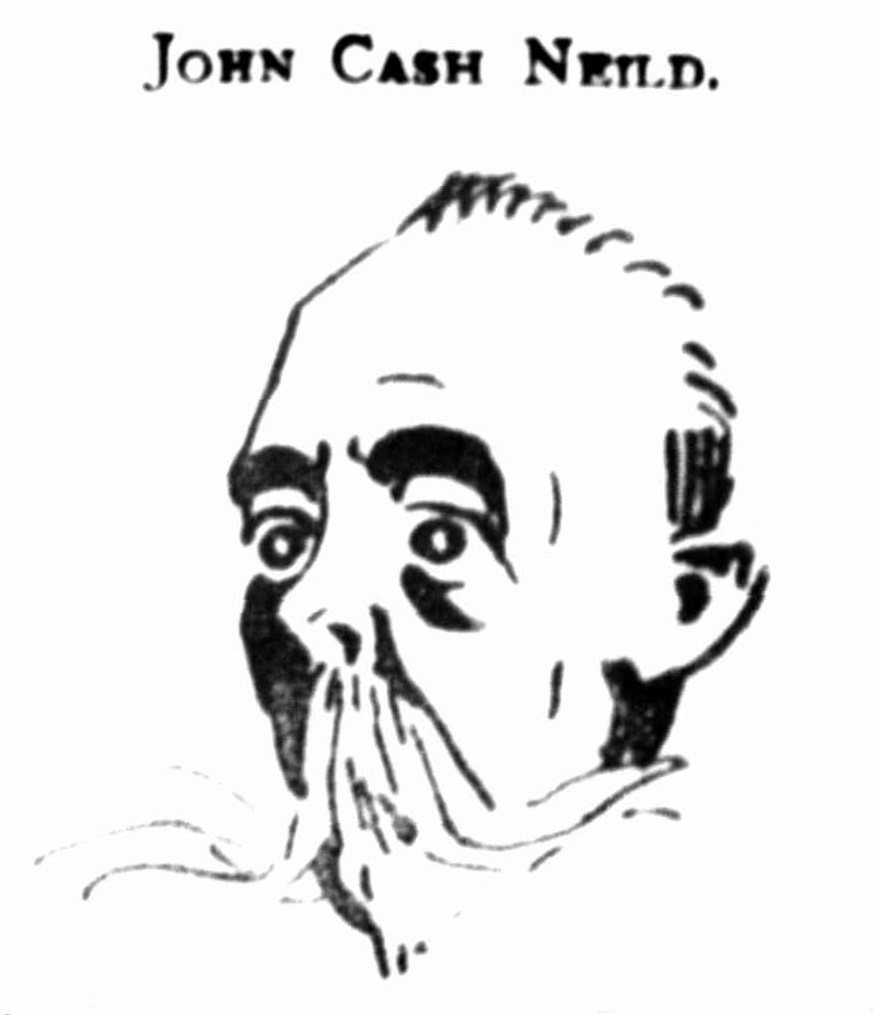
Caricature of John Cash Neild, published in The Sunbury News (Christmas Supplement), 25 December 1902.

Neild was an active member on some of the Senate's first committees. In August 1901 he introduced his Parliament Evidence Bill to the Senate. It was almost identical to existing New South Wales legislation and aimed "to enable and regulate the taking of evidence by Parliament and Parliamentary Committees". However the bill was withdrawn and reintroduced several times over the next decade and was never passed into law. During debate on the Immigration Restriction Bill and Pacific Islands Labourers Act Neild opposed as cowardly and 'un-English' the exclusion of non-British immigrants by a dictation test "in a European language" and the forcible deportation of Kanaka labourers. Aspects of Neild's past were often mocked by his opponents in debates in the Senate chamber. During one debate in December 1901, for example, he was referred to as "a gentleman with a magnificent record for stonewalling". In another instance, Neild commented that "mere stubborness did not represent strength", to which another senator retorted: "Nor doggerel poetry" (followed by general laughter). Neild was not a supporter of party discipline and refused to adhere to the discipline imposed by Sir Josiah Symon in his role as leader of the Free Trade senators.

Neild's fifth position in a quota of six senators at the 1901 election required that he face re-election at the next general election, held in December 1903. Standing again as a Free Trade candidate, and supported by George Reid (opposition leader in the House of Representatives), Neild campaigned on his advocacy of Commonwealth old-age pensions, free trade and loyalty to the British Empire. He criticised the Deakin government for its efforts to deport Kanakas "who had become naturalised British subjects, who had sworn fealty to the Crown" and denounced the catch-cry of 'white Australia' as a "fraud and a sham". Despite being in precarious health, Neild campaigned strongly and was elected at the top of the poll as a New South Wales senator.

During a Senate debate in March 1904, Neild was critical of the government's military policy and of the commander of federal military forces, Major-General Sir Edward Hutton. Shortly afterwards Brigadier-General Henry Finn, the New South Wales military commander, waited upon Neild at the behest of Major-General Hutton. The senator was asked by Finn to resign from the St. George's Rifles "on the score of ill-health". However Neild refused, claiming to be "in the pink of condition", after which Hutton wrote to the Minister of Defence, Austin Chapman, recommending that Neild "should be retired on account of his speeches in the Senate, and because of the alleged disaffection in his regiment". Austin declined to act without "stronger reasons". When Neild was interviewed about the situation, he said defiantly: "I am 58 years of age and I will have to retire in two years, but hang me if I am going to be kicked out". On 21 April 1904 Neild brought forward "a matter of privilege" in the Senate, and successfully moved for the appointment of a select committee to investigate whether General Hutton had sought to intimidate or interfere with him in the discharge of his duties as a senator. The committee, initially chaired by Senator Dawson, began sitting the following day. The committee's investigation was wide-ranging, including the examination of incidents in 1903 involving Neild's dismissal of Sergeant George King from the regiment for misconduct and the subsequent memorial to Neild from twelve non-commissioned officers in reference to King's discharge, a situation described by Neild as "closely bordering on mutiny".

The committee's report was presented to the Senate in October 1904. It found that Hutton's attempt to force Neild's retirement was partly for military reasons and partly in consequence of speeches he had made in the Senate. The committee also found that Hutton's "comments or protests against Senator Neild's speeches in the Senate may be regarded us an attempt to interfere with Senator Neild in the discharge of his duties as a senator, but such comments or protests did not amount to intimidation" (falling short of finding General Hutton guilty of contempt of parliament). In January 1905 it was reported that Lieutenant-Colonel Neild, having "been on leave for several months consequent on ill health and Parliamentary engagements", has resumed active duty as commanding officer of the St. George's English Rifles. In April 1905 Neild resigned his command of the regiment, stating that the requirement to study "the enormous number" of military regulations was incompatible with his political duties. In September 1905 two months' leave of absence from attending Senate sittings were granted to Neild, on account of being seriously ill from pneumonia. In April 1906 he was appointed as an honorary colonel of his old command.

Neild introduced a number of bills in his remaining five years in the Senate, all of which lapsed. He continued to speak out on civil rights issues, defending army officers and Muslim camel drivers and expressing opposition to compulsory military training for boys. He continued to oppose elements of the White Australia policy, raising concerns about Australian-born children of Kanaka labourers.

Neild was defeated at the general election in April 1910. Each of the three senators elected for New South Wales were members of the Australian Labor Party.

=== Last years ===
Neild was known for "his remarkable capacity for letter writing", with a "tenacity of purpose" bordering on a mania. One writer commented: "Once he took up a cause, or set himself to attain a desired end, he could always be relied upon to fight and argue until he had achieved his object – or if he did not do that, it was safe to bet that he would have the last word, even though it was only one with which to open a possible track for further argument with tongue or pen in the future". George Reid, a political ally, described Neild as "a man of great ability, zeal, and thoroughness, but had a very sensitive nature, was quick in attack, and most caustic in defence".

Towards the end of his life Neild suffered from hepatic cirrhosis. In January 1911 he was admitted to the Royal Prince Alfred Hospital, having been "seriously ill for some time". After about a month he was permitted to return home. Prior to his death in March 1911 Neild was confined to his bed. During his last few days his heart was "rapidly failing, and his demise was not unexpected".

John Cash Neild died on 8 March 1911 at his home in Edgecliff Road, Woollahra, aged 65. He received a military funeral and was buried at Waverley Cemetery in Sydney, with Anglican rites.

== Satirical representations ==
John Neild's high public profile, extravagant gestures and elaborate facial hair (with a moustache curled like the "dashing militaire") were fully exploited by cartoonists and satirists. In the 3 July 1886 issue of The Bulletin a small item was published: "It used to be J. C. Neild. Now it is J. B. Neild – Jaw Bone Neild". In the same issue the Bulletin cartoonists Livingston Hopkins and Phil May made three separate attempts at depicting Neild in his incarnation as a renowned long-duration orator. Hopkins represented Neild as a "patent self-acting, self-winding, talking machine, warranted to go on for nine hours and produce sweet and refreshing slumber". On the following page Phil May depicting Neild as "the man with the iron jaw". However it was May's other attempt in the same issue that produced the most enduring image depicting Neild's nine-hour marathon speech. The cartoon 'Jawbone Neild, and Where He Got His Weapon' was a caricature of the member for Paddington holding aloft the jawbone of an ass (referencing the biblical Samson), with the head of a donkey at his feet.

Soon after Neild's nine-hour speech in parliament the Catholic Freeman's Journal wrote about "Mr. Jawbone Neild" and "his jackass speech". In late July 1886 the Nepean Times republished a satirical article from Hayne's Weekly titled 'The Mayor's Ball', in which "several of the more prominent characters" attending the ball were described. Amongst those listed was J. C. Neild who went as "Sampson with the jawbone of an ass (his own)".

Neild's poetry, described as "an awkward combination of the mannered and the vernacular", was also a source of satire, in particular the much-quoted and parodied line: "Eftsoons a nocent watersprout would rise".

== Gallery ==
John Neild as depicted by cartoonists
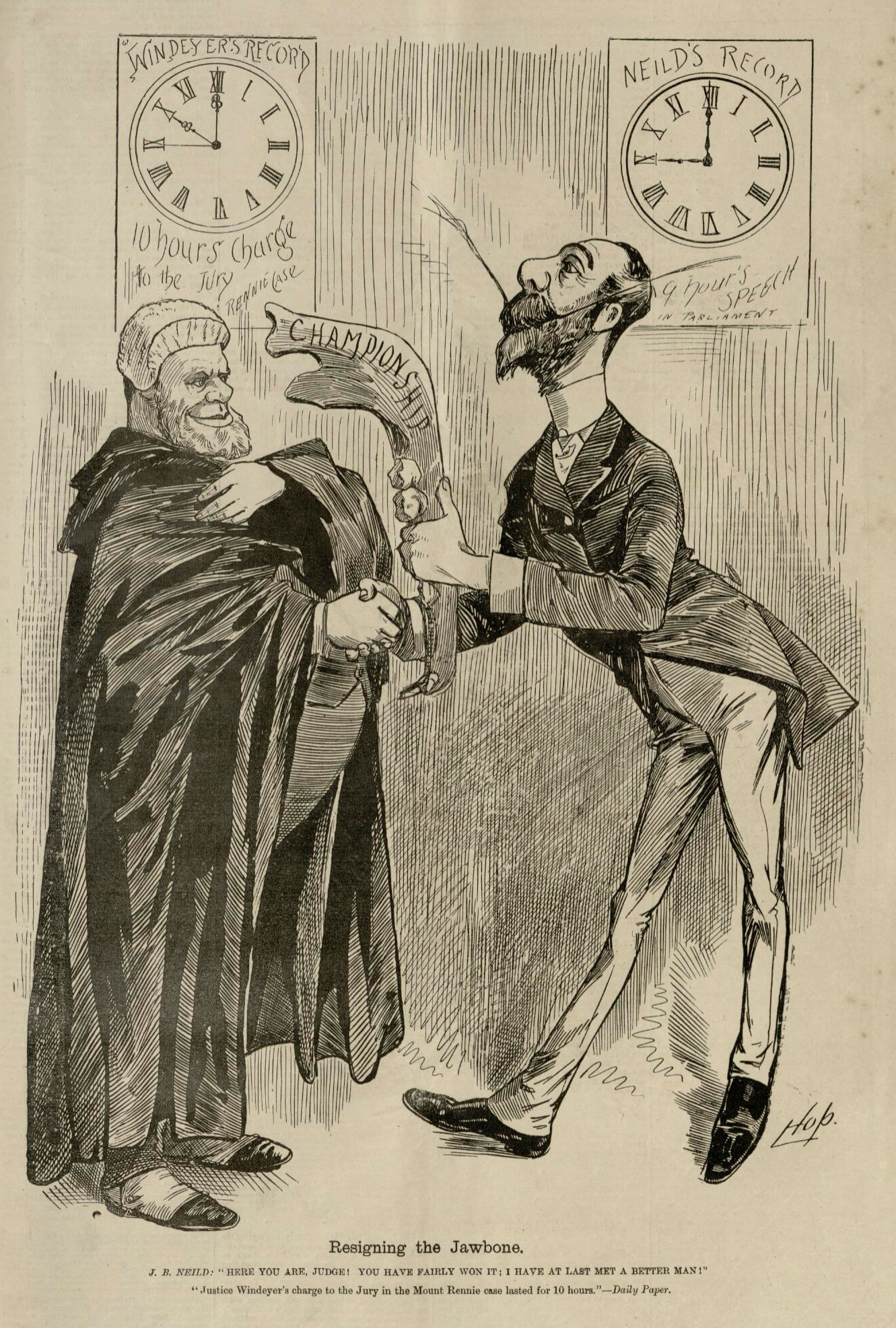
'Resigning the Jawbone', a cartoon by Livingston Hopkins, depicting John 'Jawbone' Neild and Justice Windeyer, published in The Bulletin, 4 December 1886.

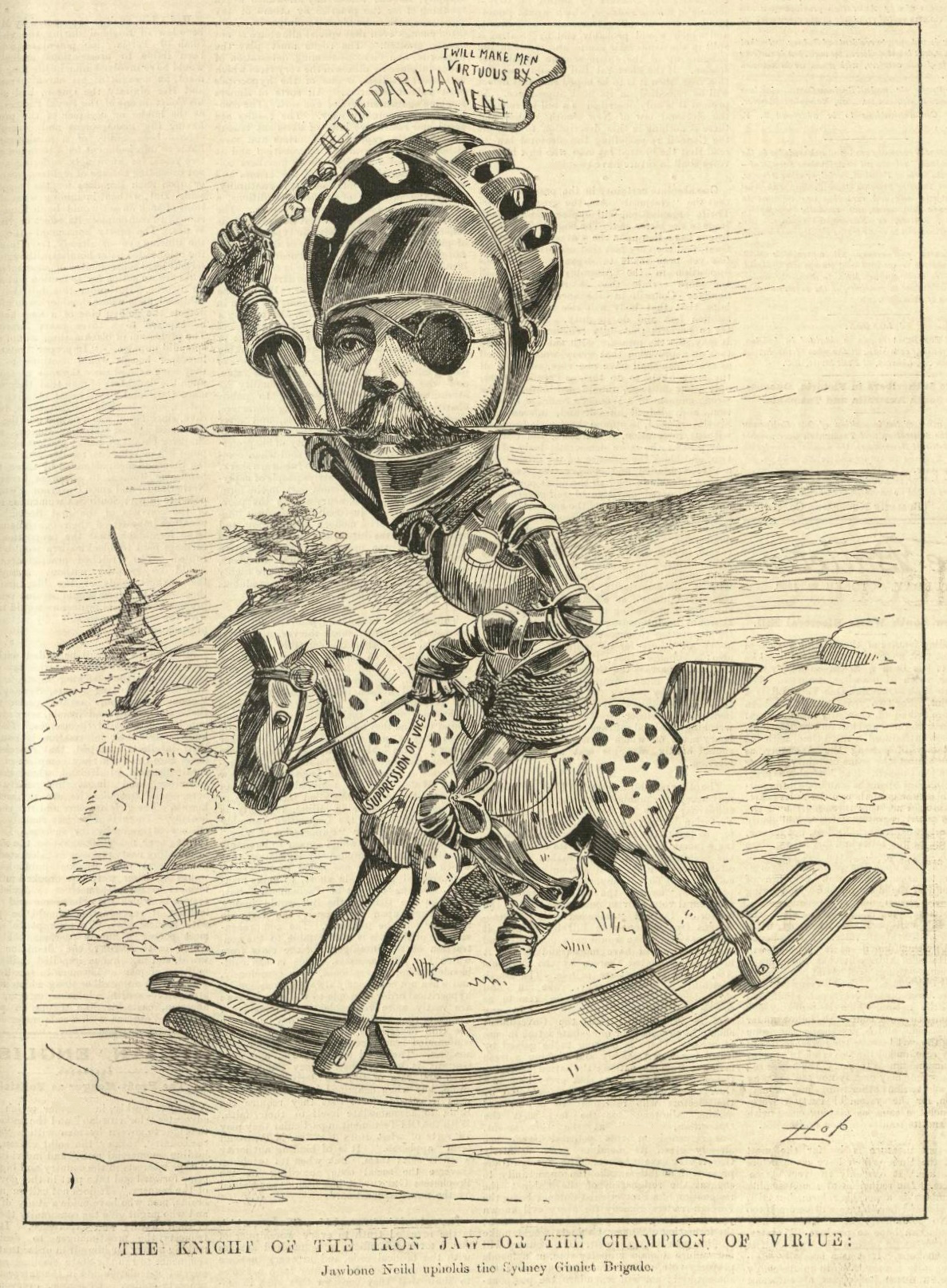
'The Knight of the Iron Jaw – Or the Champion of Virtue', cartoon depicting Neild by Livingston Hopkins, published in The Bulletin, 22 October 1892.

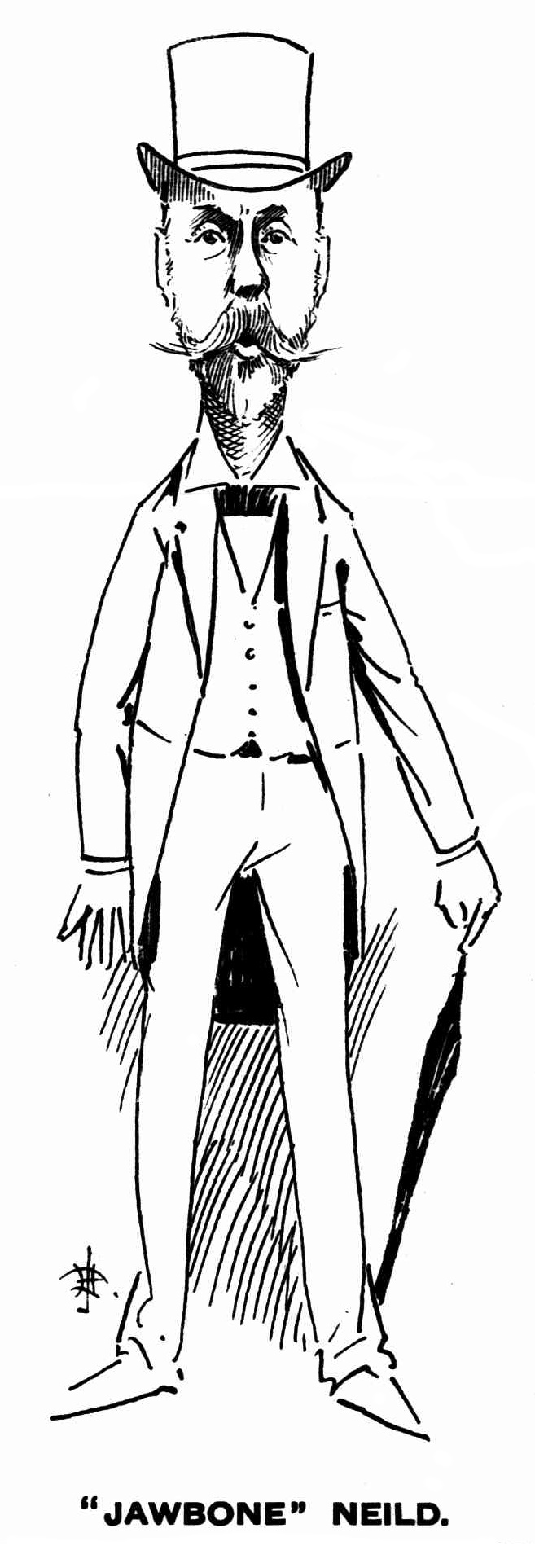
Cartoon of John 'Jawbone' Neild by John Henry Chinner, published in Quiz and the Lantern, 14 May 1896.

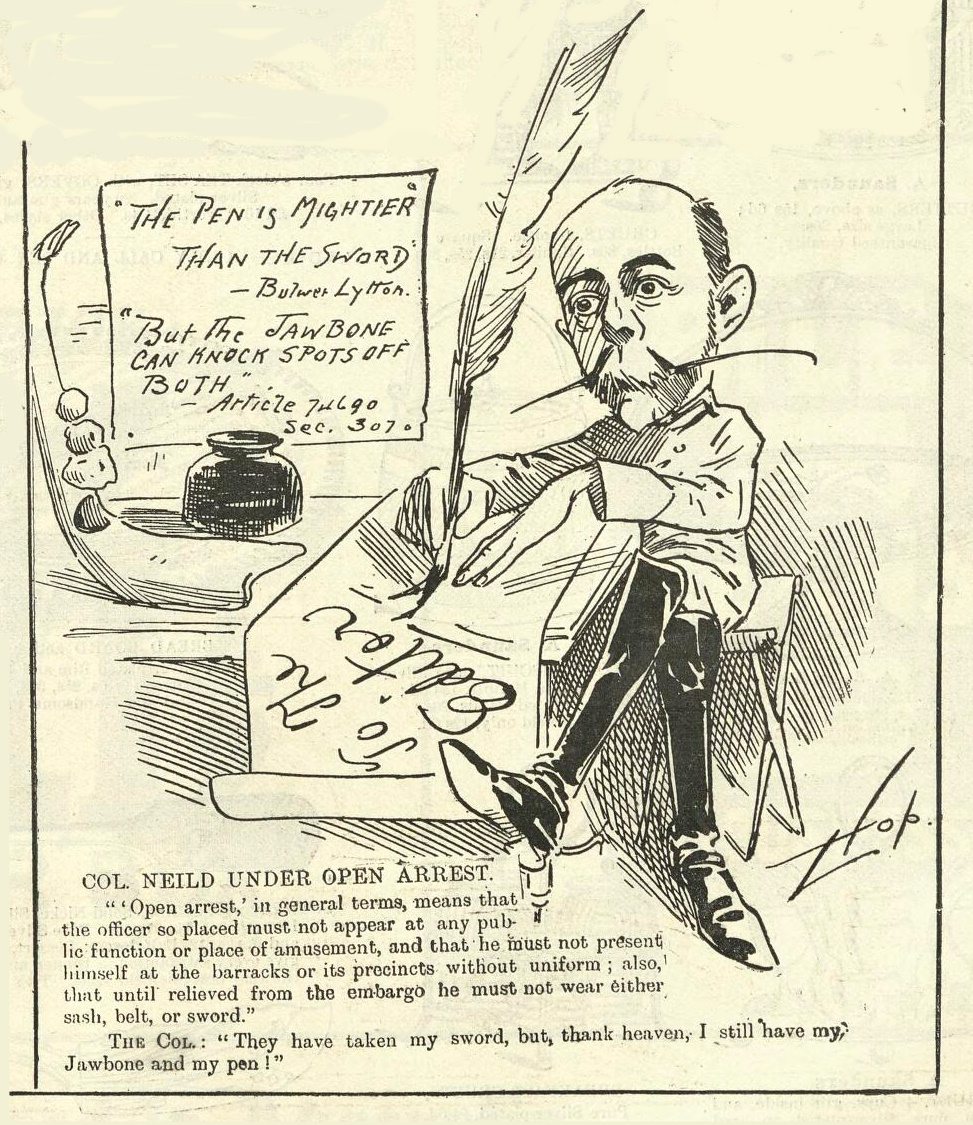
A cartoon depicting John C. 'Jawbone' Neild by Livingston Hopkins, published in The Bulletin, 22 April 1899.

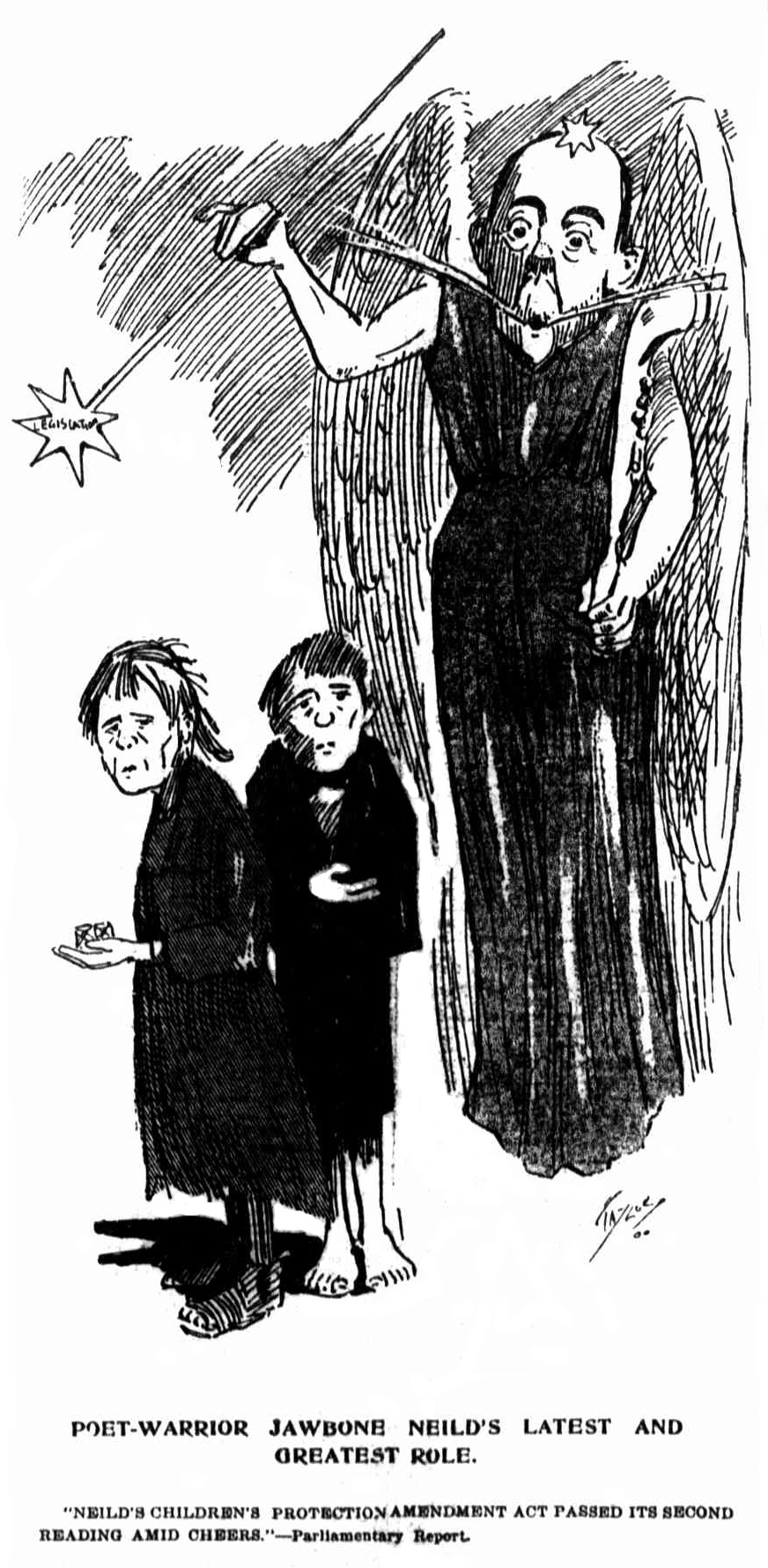
'Poet-Warrior Jawbone Neild's Latest and Greatest Role', cartoon depicting John C. Neild by "Taylor", published in The Arrow, 20 October 1900.

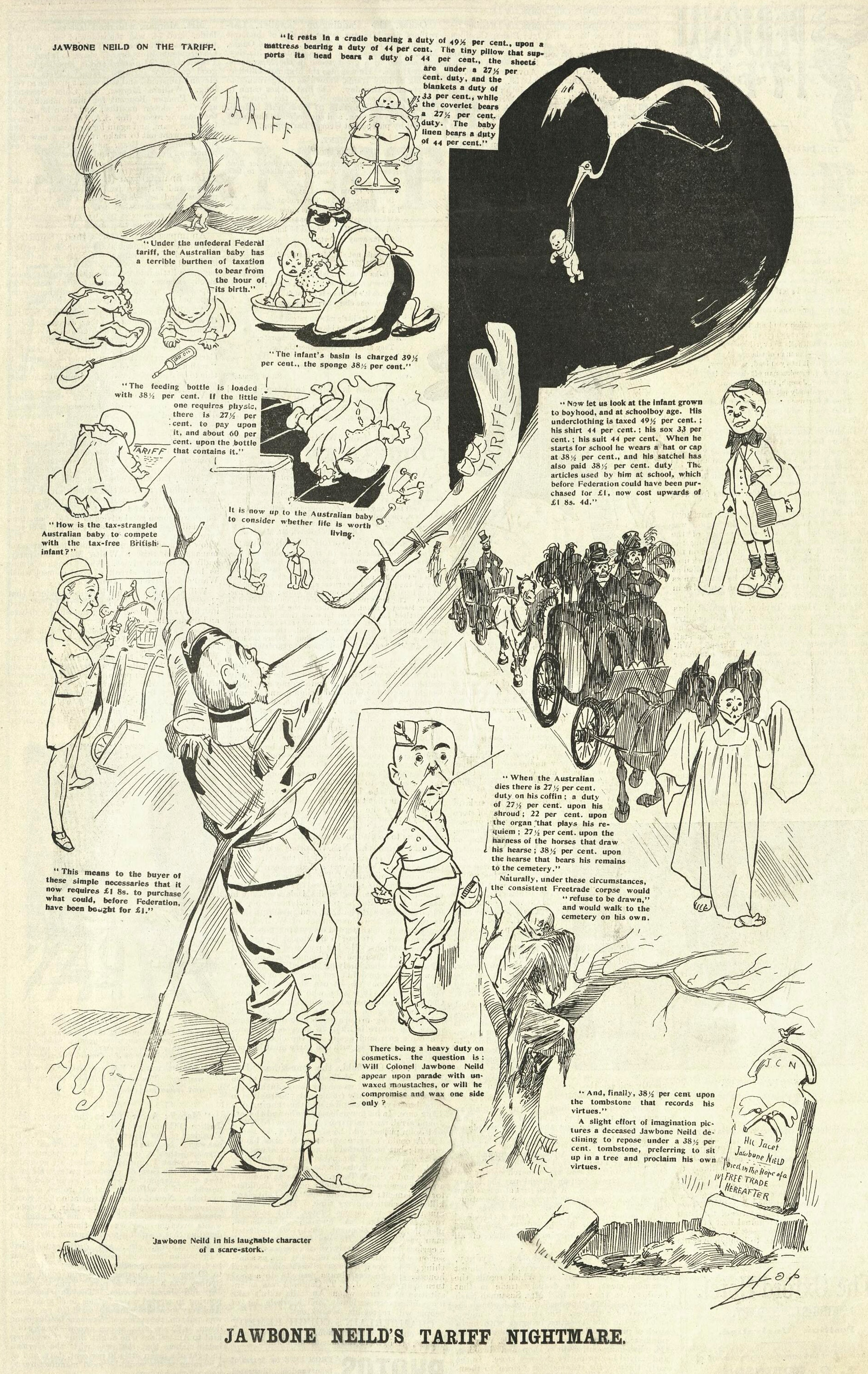
'Jawbone Neild's Tariff Nightmare', a group of cartoons depicting John C. 'Jawbone' Neild by Livingston Hopkins, published in The Bulletin, 3 October 1907.

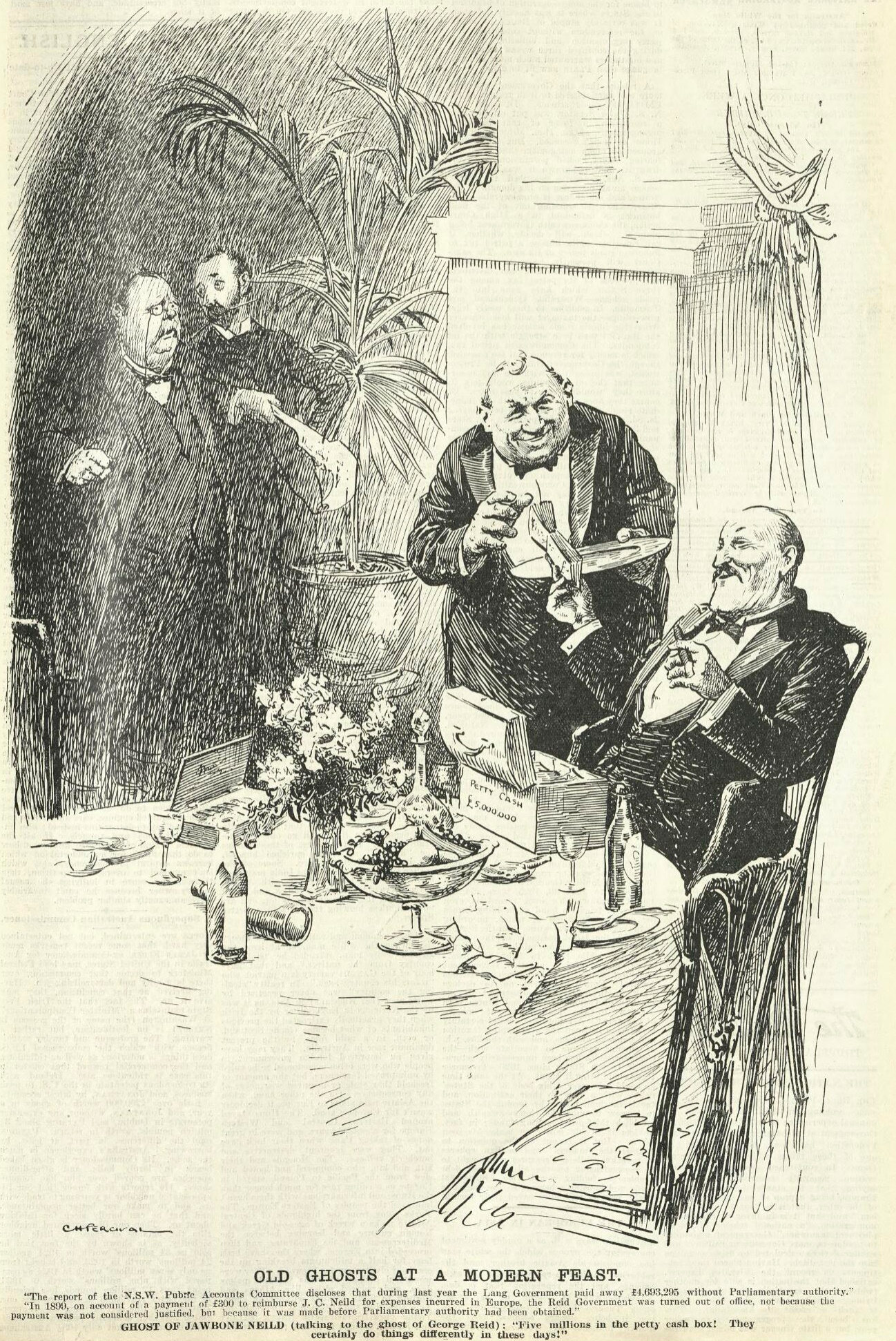
'Old Ghosts at a Modern Feast', cartoon depicting Jack Lang and the ghosts of George Reid and John C. Neild, by Cecil Humphrey Percival, published in The Bulletin, 4 November 1926.

== Publications ==
- Songs 'Neath the Southern Cross, Sydney: George Robertson & Co. 1896.
- Report on Old Age Pensions, Charitable Relief and State Insurance in England and on the Continent of Europe, Sydney: Government Printer, 1898.

== Notes ==
A.John Cash Neild (senior) was born in February 1814 in Manchester, county Cheshire. He studied medicine at Berlin University, attaining the degrees of Doctor of Medicine and Doctor of Surgery, as well as the Diploma of Member of the Royal College of Surgeons (MRCS). He settled in Bristol where he was an honorary staff-member of the Bristol General Hospital and a lecturer on anatomy. After he brought his family to Australia in 1860, Dr. Neild initially worked as a doctor in Sydney. In July 1865 Dr. Neild chartered the steamer Agnes Irving to convey his family and effects from Sydney to Port Macquarie. He had leased the 'Lake Innes' property "for the purpose of commencing the cultivation of the sugar cane and the manufacture of sugar". In about August 1866 Dr. Neild was appointed as "Surgeon and Dispenser of the Port Macquarie Asylum for the Infirm and Destitute". He returned to Sydney in 1873 where he resumed practicing as a doctor. From 1881 Neild (senior) resided at Camden, south-west of Sydney. He died on 9 October 1892 at Camden.

B.Neild was eventually discharged from bankruptcy in August 1893.

C.An officer placed under 'open arrest' was not permitted to appear at any public function or place of amusement and must not present himself at the barracks or its precincts without uniform. He was also not permitted to wear either sash, belt or sword.

New South Wales Legislative Assembly
Preceded by Robert Butcher; William Trickett	Member for Paddington; 1885–1889; With: Robert Butcher / Alfred Allen; William Trickett / William Allen	Succeeded by Alfred Allen; Robert King; John Shepherd; Jack Want
Preceded by Alfred Allen; Robert King; John Shepherd; Jack Want	Member for Paddington; 1891–1894; With: Alfred Allen; James Marks; Jack Want	Succeeded by William Shipway
Preceded by William Shipway	Member for Paddington; 1895–1901	Succeeded by Charles Oakes
