= Randolph Want =

English-born Australian politician

Randolph John Want (1811 – 28 June 1869) was an English-born Australian politician.

He was born in London to surgeon John Want and Mary Nott. He migrated to New South Wales in 1829 and was granted land near Camden. In 1837 he was admitted as a solicitor. On 28 September 1839 he married Harriette Lister, with whom he had nine children. one of these, John Henry, would be a significant politician in the latter half of the nineteenth century.

From 1856 to 1861 he was a member of the New South Wales Legislative Council. He was also a pioneer of shale mining in New South Wales.

Want died in 1869 (aged 57–58) .
