= William Shipway =

Australian politician

William Charles Shipway (2 September 1862 – 28 June 1925) was an Australian politician.

Born in Braidwood to Joshua Shipway and Mary Downey, he attended school in Yass and Sydney and was articled as a solicitor, admitted in 1890. He served in Sudan with the New South Wales Infantry Regiment in 1885. From 1894 to 1895, he was the Free Trade member for Paddington in the New South Wales Legislative Assembly. He married Mabel Adeline Bull on 15 September 1897 in Liverpool, with whom he had four children. Shipway died in Mosman in 1925.

New South Wales Legislative Assembly
Preceded by Alfred Allen; James Marks; John Neild; Jack Want	Member for Paddington; 1894–1895	Succeeded by John Neild
