= Robert John King =

Australian politician

Robert John King (1839 – 25 July 1899) was an Australian politician.

He was born in Sydney to merchant George King and Jane Creighton. He was a businessman before entering politics, succeeding his father at the family firm. On 19 December 1865 he married Lucy Chatfield, with whom he had a son. In 1889 he was elected to the New South Wales Legislative Assembly as the Free Trade member for Paddington, serving until his defeat in 1891. King died at Bondi in 1899.

New South Wales Legislative Assembly
Preceded by Alfred Allen; William Allen; John Neild	Member for Paddington; 1889–1891; With: Alfred Allen; John Shepherd; Jack Want	Succeeded by Alfred Allen; James Marks; John Neild; Jack Want
