= Robert Butcher =

Australian politician

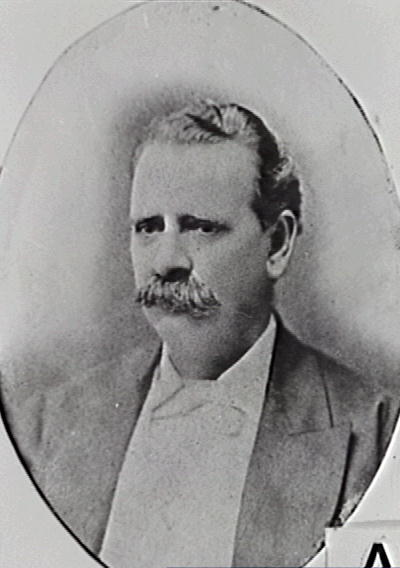
Robert Butcher

Robert Butcher (1834 – 14 October 1888) was an English-born Australian politician.

He was born at Liverpool to mercantile clerk Edward Butcher and Isabella Harrop. He left school at a young age to work for Gibbs, Bright & Co. He migrated to Australia in 1852 and went to the goldfields before clerking for wine merchant William Long, whose business he eventually inherited. On 8 February 1855 he married Robina Mary Gibbon, with whom he had four children; a second marriage on 17 August 1869 to Mary Theresa Keen resulted in a further four children. He served on Woollahra council from 1877 to 1886 (mayor from 1881 to 1886) and on Sydney City Council from 1880 to 1883. In 1882 he was elected to the New South Wales Legislative Assembly for Paddington, serving until he retired in 1887. He was also a director of Sydney Hospital.

Butcher died at Waverley in 1888.

New South Wales Legislative Assembly
Preceded by William Hezlet	Member for Paddington; 1882–1887; Served alongside: William Trickett, none/John Neild	Succeeded by Alfred Allen
