= Jawbone club =

Native American bone weapon

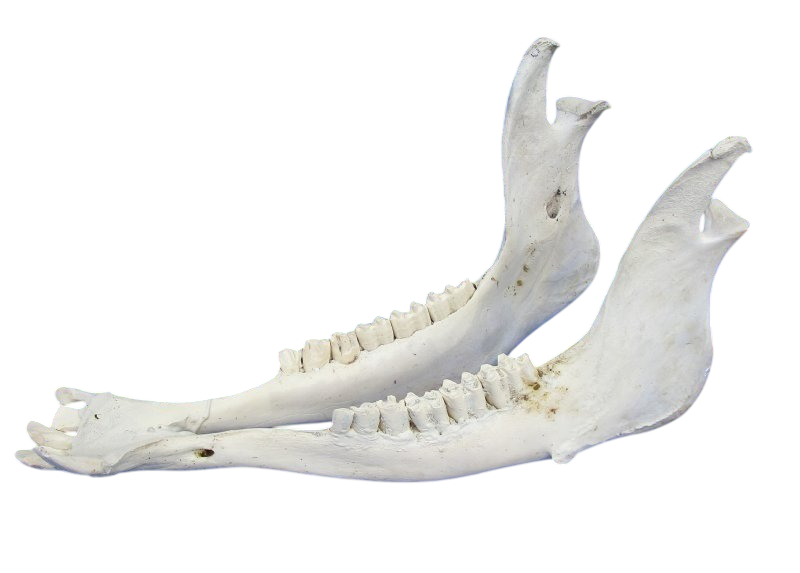
Raw material for making jawbone war clubs

A jawbone war club is an edged weapon that was in the past used by Native American tribes. The weapon is made out of the mandible of an elk, bison, horse or bear. It was common practice to add leather to make a weapon's handle. Such war club were sometimes painted with symbols of tribal significance. Despite being a relatively primitive weapon, it was considered highly effective, and saw widespread use in prehistoric North America. The weapon was used primarily for close combat and was able to penetrate a human's chest. Occasionally the jawbone war club's teeth were polished.
