= John Barnes (New South Wales politician) =

Australian politician

John Frederick Barnes (1838 – 21 April 1915) was an English-born Australian politician.

He was born in London to storekeeper John Barnes and Elizabeth Ellen King. The family emigrated to New South Wales and settled at Little River, a small sheep station near Yass. Young John attended Burwood Denominational School until the age of fourteen, when he went to the Turon River gold rush. After trying unsuccessfully at Ophir and Abercrombie, he returned to Sydney to be apprenticed to a cabinet maker. After another abortive attempt on the goldfields, he worked as a salesman. In 1860 he married Jane Marshall in Sydney; they would have seven children. In 1861 Barnes went to the goldfields at Lambing Flat to support the family store at Cootamundra; Barnes and his younger brother took over the business in 1875. He was also the local hotelier and postmaster, and was Cootamundra's first mayor in 1884.

In 1887 he retired from business and turned his attention to politics, winning election to the New South Wales Legislative Assembly in 1889 as the Protectionist member for Gundagai. He served in that capacity until the reduction in the Assembly's size in 1904, when he was defeated running for Cootamundra.

Barnes then retired from public life and moved to Sydney, dying at Hurstville in 1915.

New South Wales Legislative Assembly
Preceded by Jack Want	Member for Gundagai; 1889–1904	District abolished
