= John Shepherd (Australian politician) =

Australian politician

John Shepherd (1849 – 8 April 1893) was an Australian politician.

He was born in Melbourne to John Shepherd and Eliza Audley. A solicitor, he moved to Sydney around 1873. On 25 October 1883 he married Margaret Kennedy Yorston Ballantyne, with whom he had a daughter. In 1877 he was elected to the New South Wales Legislative Assembly for Wellington; he did not contest the subsequent election in 1880. He returned to the Assembly in 1885 as the member for East Macquarie, but was defeated running for Paddington in 1887. A Free Trader, he served his final term on election to Paddington in 1889, and did not contest in 1891. Shepherd died in Sydney in 1893.

New South Wales Legislative Assembly
Preceded by John Smith	Member for Wellington; 1877–1880	Succeeded by Edmund Barton
Preceded by Edward Combes	Member for East Macquarie; 1885–1887; Served alongside: Sydney Smith	Succeeded by James Tonkin
Preceded by William Allen; John Neild	Member for Paddington; 1889–1891; Served alongside: Alfred Allen, Robert King, Jack Want	Succeeded by James Marks; John Neild
