= William Johnston Allen =

Australian politician

William Johnston Allen (1835 – 12 June 1915) was an Irish-born Australian politician.

== Biography ==
William Johnston Allen was born in Belfast, Ireland, the eldest child of Ruth Sayers Johnston and soap manufacturer William Bell Allen, later a member of the New South Wales Legislative Assembly, as the member for Williams from 1860 until 1864. His father arrived in Sydney in 1841, and his mother brought William and his sister Eliza Allen, in 1844. When he grew older, William joined his father in the soap and candle business.

On 21 April 1868 he married Edith Isabella Crew; they had eight children.

== Legislative Assembly ==
William unsuccessfully stood for election to the Legislative Assembly for the district of Paddington, in 1880 for the then two member district, 1882, and 1887 as a member of the Protectionist Party. His brother Alfred also stood for Paddington in 1887 but for the Free Trade Party and was elected, second of three Free Trade members.

In 1888 William was narrowly elected in a by-election for Paddington in 1888, in which three Free Trade members stood for the single vacancy, splitting the vote. thereby sitting on the opposite side of the Legislative Assembly to Alfred. William was defeated in 1889 while Alfred was re-elected. Alfred was re-elected in 1891 and William again campaigned unsuccessfully against him.

In 1895 the brothers both stood for the single member district of Waverley, however neither were elected.

== Death ==
Allen died in Waverley on 12 June 1915 (aged 79–80).

New South Wales Legislative Assembly
Preceded by William Trickett	Member for Paddington; 1888–1889; With: Alfred Allen; John Neild	Succeeded by Alfred Allen; Robert King; John Shepherd; Jack Want
