= Jack Want =

Australian politician

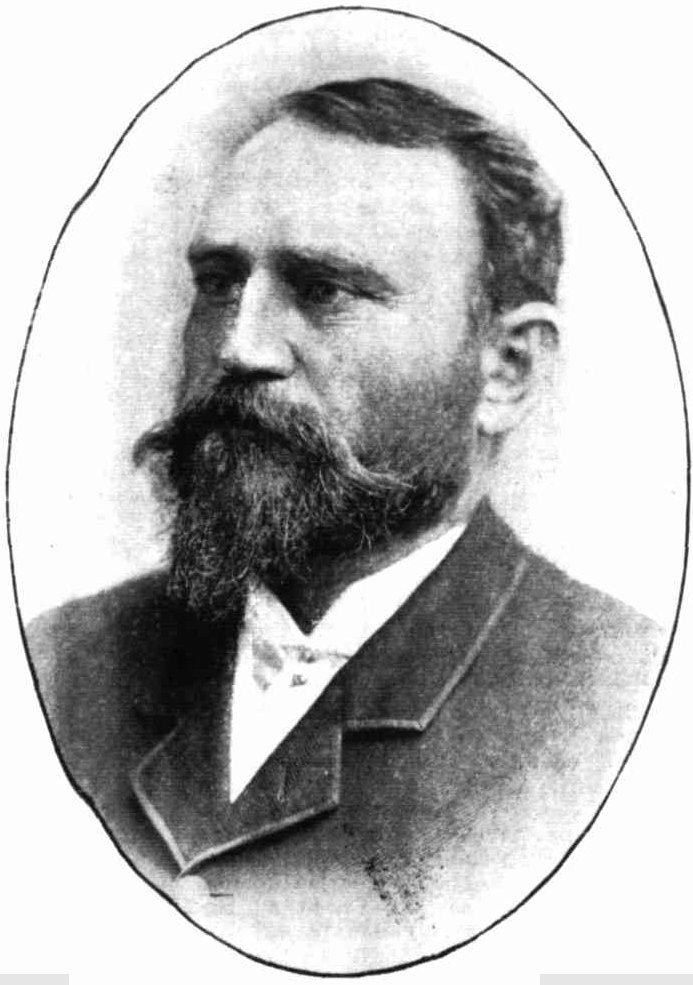

John Henry Want QC (4 May 1846 – 22 November 1905) was an Australian barrister and politician, as well as the 19th Attorney-General of New South Wales.

== Early life ==
Want was born at the Glebe, Sydney, the fourth son of nine children of Randolph John Want, a solicitor, and his wife, Hariette, née Lister. Want was educated at Rev. W. H. Savigny's Collegiate School, Cooks River, and reportedly in Caen, Normandy, France, where he learned to speak fluent French. Want worked in his father's office but soon became bored with the legal practice, went on the land in Queensland, and afterward worked in a mine at Lithgow. Want then returned to Sydney and read in the chambers of Sir Frederick Darley. Want was called to the bar on 13 November 1869 and established a large practice as a barrister. He also engaged in many profitable commercial ventures, some of a "suspicious character".

== The Mignonette ==
Want was a keen yachtsman, his father had been a founding member of the Royal Sydney Yacht Squadron in 1862, and in 1883 Want travelled to England to look for a new vessel. He purchased the Mignonette at Cowes, a 19.43 net tonnage, 52 foot cruiser built in 1867. The yacht could only reasonably be transported to Australia by sailing her there but she was a small vessel and the prospect of a 15,000 mile voyage hampered Want's initial attempts to find a suitable crew. However, she finally set sail for Sydney from Southampton on 19 May 1884 with a crew of four: Tom Dudley, the captain; Edwin Stephens; Edmund Brooks; and Richard Parker, the cabin boy. Parker was aged 17 and an inexperienced seaman.

On 5 July, the yacht was running before a gale at 27°10' south, 9°50' west, around 1,600 miles northwest of the Cape of Good Hope. Though the weather was by no means extreme and the vessel was not in any difficulties, a wave struck the yacht and washed away the lee bulwarks. Dudley instantly realised that the yacht was doomed and ordered the single 13-foot lifeboat to be lowered. The Mignonette sank within five minutes of being struck and the crew abandoned ship for the lifeboat, only managing to salvage vital navigational instruments along with two tins of turnips and no fresh water. There have been various theories about the structural inadequacies of the yacht that led to such a catastrophic failure in routine weather.

The crew were adrift for 24 days and resorted to cannibalism, with Parker being killed and eaten and Dudley and Stephens later prosecuted in England in a landmark case.

== Political career ==
=== Lower house ===
Want was a candidate for the New South Wales Legislative Assembly seat of Gundagai at the 1884 by-election, but was unsuccessful. Want was successful at the 1885 election, His parliamentary skills were recognised and he became Attorney-General in the first ministry of George Dibbs (October to December 1885) and in the Patrick Jennings ministry (February 1886 to January 1887).

He was a staunch free-trader and with the emergence of political parties in 1887 stopped working with Dibbs and Jennings who had formed the Protectionist Party, and Henry Parkes who led the bulk of free traders. Want stood as an independent free trade candidate at the 1887 election where he was re-elected.

In January 1889 Want moved to adjourn the Assembly, so as to censure the appointment of William Meeke Fehon as one of the Railway Commissioners, and the motion was carried 37 to 23. The then premier, Sir Henry Parkes, treated this as a vote of no confidence and resigned.

The Governor, Lord Carrington accepting his recommendation to call for George Dibbs to form his second ministry. Dibbs never commanded a majority on the floor of the Assembly and almost immediately parliament was dissolved and an election called. For the resulting election Want was a candidate for Paddington, standing as an independent free trader, despite his views on Parkes and his role in moving for the adjournment of the house, and was the first elected of four members. In May 1891 four free traders, Want, George Reid, John Haynes and Jonathan Seaver, voted against the fifth Parkes Ministry in a motion of no confidence, which was only defeated by the casting vote of the Speaker. Whilst the government survived the motion, parliament was dissolved on 6 June 1891 and his opposition to Parkes meant that Want reverted to standing as an independent free trade candidate for the 1891 election. He was the second elected of four members. He was not anxious for office and temporarily retired from politics in 1894.

Want was appointed a Queen's Counsel in 1887.

=== Upper house ===
Want was nominated to the New South Wales Legislative Council in 1894 and from 18 December 1894 until April 1899 (apart from 10 weeks in 1898) was attorney-general in the ministry of George Reid.

In 1897, in the face of a ferocious rear guard action by Edward Barton, Want successfully steered through the Legislative Council, a requirement that the 1898 referendum on Federation receive at least 80,000 Yes votes (or 50 percent of the electorate) to be deemed successful.

Want rejoined the ministry as Attorney General, but effectively abdicated his role of leader of the opposition to Federation. In January 1899 Want left Australia for an extended journey to Europe via the Suez Canal, just as Australia's premiers were to meet and decide on a second referendum on a somewhat revised federal constitution. The upshot was that the Attorney General of New South Wales - the minister responsible for the provision of expert advice on the Constitution - was only to learn of the premiers decision when a copy of the Daily Graphic reached him on his desert wanders through Egypt. He resigned from the ministry in the following April. With no obvious cause, Want was absent from the campaign over the second referendum held in June 1899, when New South Wales voted in favour of federation. Want's abdication of his responsibility and role in the struggle over Federation remains mysterious.

== Later life ==
Want protested the basing of the new High Court of Australia in Melbourne. He was never held office again. He died of appendicitis on 22 November 1905.

== Personality and assessment ==
He was "flamboyant and ostentatious, usually going by the name of "Jack" or "Jimmy". Want could have been Premier in 1889 but let the Governor know he would be "damned" if he would accept the appointment, and he twice declined the position of Chief Justice.

Parliament of New South Wales
Political offices
Preceded by William Dalley	Attorney General; October – December 1885	Succeeded by George Simpson
Preceded by George Simpson	Attorney General; February 1886 – January 1887	Succeeded by William Foster
Preceded by George Simpson QC	Attorney General; 1894 – 1899	Succeeded by William Foster
Preceded by Robert Wisdom	Attorney General; 1883 – 1885	Succeeded by Jack Want
New South Wales Legislative Assembly
Preceded by James Watson	Member for Gundagai; 1885–1889	Succeeded by John Barnes
Preceded by Alfred Allen; William Allen; John Neild	Member for Paddington; 1889–1894; With: Alfred Allen; Robert King / John Neild; John Shepherd / James Marks	Succeeded by William Shipway
