= William Hezlet =

Australian politician

William Hezlet (1825 – 26 June 1903) was an Irish-born Australian politician.

He was born at Newry to Matthew Hezlet and Marjorie Oliver. He migrated to New South Wales around 1843, becoming a commercial agent. In 1845 he was the second person initiated into the New South Wales Loyal Orange institution. On 15 July 1858 he married Sarah Griffen, with whom he had six children. In 1880 he was elected to the New South Wales Legislative Assembly for Paddington. He did not re-contest in 1882. Hezlet died at Ashfield in 1903.

New South Wales Legislative Assembly
Preceded by John Sutherland	Member for Paddington; 1880–1882; Served alongside: none/William Trickett	Succeeded by Robert Butcher
