= James Marks (politician) =

Australian politician

James Marks (1835 – 12 January 1907) was an Australian politician.

He was born in Sydney to publican James Marks and Elizabeth Charles. He attended school privately in Sydney and then worked on his father's farm. In 1862 he married Sarah Jane Moffitt, with whom he had six children. The family farm was such a success that Marks was able to retire at the age of forty, moving to Woollahra where he became a local alderman. In 1891 he was elected to the New South Wales Legislative Assembly as the Free Trade member for Paddington, but he did not re-contest in 1894. Marks died at Woollahra in 1907.

His son Walter Marks became a federal MP, while his brother John Marks and uncle Samuel Charles also served in the colonial parliament.

New South Wales Legislative Assembly
Preceded by Alfred Allen; Robert King; John Shepherd; Jack Want	Member for Paddington; 1891–1894; With: Alfred Allen; John Neild; Jack Want	Succeeded by William Shipway
