= Alfred Allen (Australian politician) =

Australian politician

Alfred Allen (1839 – 5 August 1917) was an Irish-born Australian politician.

== Biography ==
Alfred Allen was born in Belfast to soap and candle manufacturer William Bell Allen and Ruth Johnston Sayers. His father arrived in Sydney in 1841; his mother and siblings followed in 1844. Allen's father was a member of the Legislative Assembly, as the member for Williams from 1860 until 1864.

Allen was dismissed from his apprenticeship to an engineers' firm after supporting early closing and the eight-hour day. His sister Eliza Pottie (née Allen), who was active in social reform causes, supported his campaign for a shorter workday. He worked as an engineer, goldminer, farmer, printer, manufacturer and insurance salesman before his father's death in 1869 led him to take over the family business with his brother William Johnston Allen.

He married Amelia Petford on 9 September 1861; they had four children.

== Legislative Assembly ==
He twice unsuccessfully stood for election to the New South Wales Legislative Assembly, in 1880 for the two member district of Canterbury, and in 1885 for the three member district of Paddington. In 1887 he was elected second of the three members for Paddington and all three were members of the Free Trade Party. His elder brother William was a member of the Protectionist Party and had campaigned unsuccessfully against Alfred in 1887. William was narrowly elected in a by-election in 1888, thereby sitting on the opposite side of the Legislative Assembly to Alfred. Alfred was re-elected in 1889 however William was defeated. Alfred was re-elected in 1891 and William again campaigned unsuccessfully against him.

The multi-member electorates were abolished in 1894 and Allen stood as an independent free trade candidate for Waverley, but was defeated. Both Alfred and William stood for election in 1895 for Waverley, however neither was successful. Alfred again stood unsuccessfully in 1898, this time for Queanbeyan, and 1901 for Waverley.

== Death ==
Allen died in Waverley on August 5, 1917 (aged 77–78).

New South Wales Legislative Assembly
Preceded by Robert Butcher; John Neild; William Trickett	Member for Paddington; 1887–1894; With: William Trickett / William Allen / John Shepherd / James Marks; John Neild / Robert King / John Neild; None / Jack Want	Succeeded by William Shipway
