= William Trickett =

Australian politician (1843–1916)

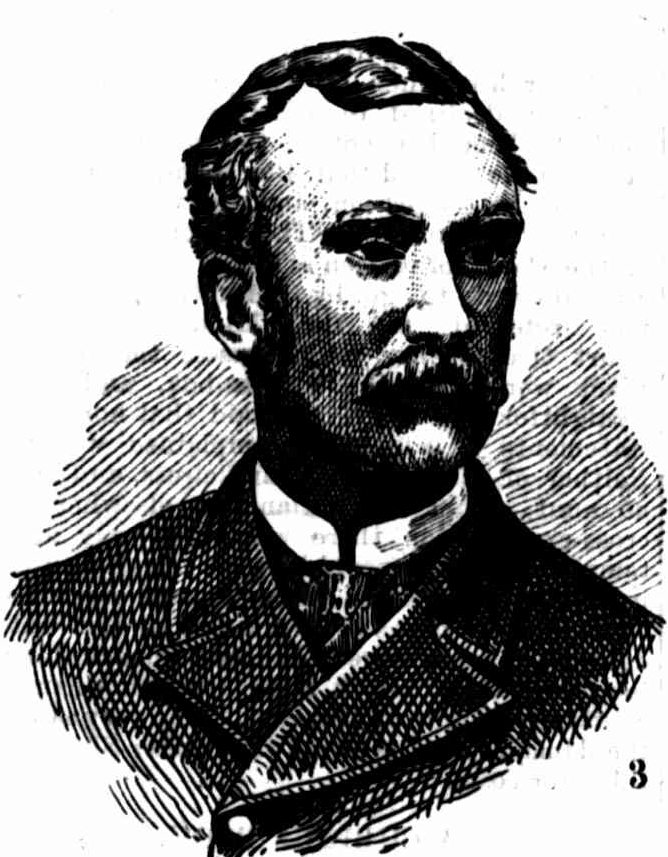

William Joseph Trickett (2 September 1843 – 4 July 1916) was a politician, Postmaster-General and solicitor in colonial New South Wales.

Trickett was the son of Joseph Trickett and Elizabeth (née Backshall), born at Gibraltar, where his father, a civil engineer, was employed on the Government works. In 1854 he accompanied his father, who was appointed manager of the coining department of the Sydney branch of the Royal Mint, to New South Wales, where he was admitted as a solicitor in 1866.

Trickett, who has been several times Mayor of the Borough of Woollahra, represented Paddington in the New South Wales Legislative Assembly from 18 November 1880 to 23 December 1887, when he resigned and was appointed a member of the New South Wales Legislative Council which he held until his death. He was Postmaster-General in the Stuart ministry from May 1883 to May 1884, when he took the position of Minister of Public Instruction in the same Government, and retained office in the succeeding first Dibbs ministry until its resignation in December 1885. Trickett was also Chairman of Committees in the Assembly for eight months, but resigned in consequence of illness. He was a justice of the peace, a trustee of the Art Gallery, a member of the State Children's Relief Board, was on the committee of the Royal Sydney Yacht Squadron, an officeholder in several of the sporting clubs, a director of several mercantile institutions, and a member of the Parliamentary Standing Committee on Public Works.

He was a commissioner for New South Wales for the international exhibitions in Calcutta in 1883, London in 1886, Adelaide in 1887 and Melbourne in 1888.

Trickett died of heart disease on 4 July 1916 (aged 72) at his home, Shorewell, in Woollahra, New South Wales. At the time of his death, he had a wife, two sons and four daughters. He was buried in the Anglican section of Waverley Cemetery.

Parliament of New South Wales
Political offices
Preceded by Francis Wright	Postmaster-General; 1883 – 1884	Succeeded by James Norton Jr.
Preceded by George Reid	Minister of Public Instruction; 1884 – 1885	Succeeded by James Young
New South Wales Legislative Assembly
Preceded by William Hezlet	Member for Paddington; 1880–1887; With: William Hezlet / Robert Butcher / Alfred Allen; John Neild	Succeeded by Alfred Allen; John Neild; William Allen
New South Wales Legislative Council
Preceded by Archibald Jacob	Chairman of Committees; 1900–1912	Succeeded by Broughton O'Conor
