= Electoral district of Paddington (New South Wales) =

Former state electoral district of New South Wales, Australia

Paddington was an electoral district of the Legislative Assembly in the Australian state of New South Wales, originally created in 1859, partly replacing Sydney Hamlets. It included the suburbs of Paddington and Redfern. The rest of Sydney's current Eastern Suburbs, which were then rural, were part of Canterbury. With the creation of the electoral districts of South Sydney and Redfern in 1880, Paddington included the northern part of the eastern suburbs, generally east of what is now known as Anzac Parade and north of Rainbow Street, including all of current Woollahra and Waverley and part of Randwick. It elected one member from 1859 to 1880, two members from 1880 to 1885, three members from 1885 to 1889 and four members from 1889 to 1894. With the abolition of multi-member constituencies in 1894, it was replaced by the single-member electorates of Paddington, Waverley, Woollahra and Randwick. In 1920, with the introduction of proportional representation, it was absorbed into Sydney. Paddington was recreated in 1927. In 1959, it was combined with part of Waverley and renamed Paddington-Waverley, which was itself abolished in 1962 and partly replaced by Bligh.

== Members for Paddington ==
First incarnation (1859–1920) Single-member (1859–1880)
Member	Party	Term									
Daniel Cooper	None	1859–1860									
John Sutherland	None	1860–1880									
William Hezlet	None	1880–1880									
Two members (1880–1885)
Member	Party	Term	Member	Party	Term						
William Hezlet	None	1880–1882	William Trickett	None	1880–1885						
Robert Butcher	None	1882–1885	William Trickett	None	1880–1885						
Three members (1885–1889)
Member	Party	Term	Member	Party	Term	Member	Party	Term			
Robert Butcher	None	1885–1887	William Trickett	None	1885–1887	John Neild	None	1885–1887			
Alfred Allen	Free Trade	1887–1889	William Trickett	Free Trade	1887–1887	John Neild	Free Trade	1887–1889			
Alfred Allen	Free Trade	1887–1889	William Allen	Protectionist	1888–1889	John Neild	Free Trade	1887–1889			
Four members (1889–1894)
Member	Party	Term	Member	Party	Term	Member	Party	Term	Member	Party	Term
Alfred Allen	Free Trade	1889–1894	John Shepherd	Free Trade	1889–1891	Robert King	Free Trade	1889–1891	Jack Want	Free Trade	1889–1891
Alfred Allen	Free Trade	1889–1894	James Marks	Free Trade	1891–1894	John Neild	Free Trade	1891–1894	Jack Want	Ind. Free Trade	1891–1894
Single-member (1894–1920)
Member	Party	Term									
William Shipway	Free Trade	1894–1895									
John Neild	Ind. Free Trade	1895–1898									
John Neild	Free Trade	1898–1901									
Charles Oakes	Liberal Reform	1901–1910									
John Osborne	Labor	1910–1919									
Lawrence O'Hara	Labor	1919–1919									
John Birt	Labor	1919–1920									
Second incarnation (1927–1959) Single-member
Member	Party	Term									
(Sir) Daniel Levy	Nationalist	1927–1930									
Maurice O'Sullivan	Labor	1930–1959									

== Election results ==
1956 New South Wales state election: Paddington
Party	Candidate	Votes	%	±%
Labor	Maurice O'Sullivan	12,570	66.4	−20.6
Liberal	Rodney Craigie	4,339	22.9	+22.9
Communist	Bill Brown	2,035	10.7	−2.3
Total formal votes		18,944	97.1	+4.4
Informal votes		573	2.9	−4.4
Turnout		19,517	91.4	+1.1
Two-party-preferred result
Labor	Maurice O'Sullivan	14,401	76.0	−11.0
Liberal	Rodney Craigie	4,543	24.0	+24.0
Labor hold		Swing	N/A	
