= Electoral district of Gundagai =

Former state electoral district of New South Wales, Australia

Gundagai New South Wales—Legislative Assembly
- State: New South Wales
- Created: 1880
- Abolished: 1904
- Namesake: Gundagai, New South Wales

Gundagai was an electoral district of the Legislative Assembly in the Australian state of New South Wales from 1880 to 1904 in the Gundagai area. It was replaced by Wynyard.

== Members for Gundagai ==
Member	Party	Period
William Forster	None	1880–1882
Bruce Smith	None	1882–1884
James Watson	None	1884–1885
Jack Want	None	1885–1887
Jack Want	Ind. Free Trade	1887–1889
John Barnes	Protectionist	1889–1901
John Barnes	Progressive	1901–1904

== Election results ==
1901 New South Wales state election: Gundagai
Party	Candidate	Votes	%	±%
Progressive	John Barnes	785	39.4	−0.3
Independent	Walter Griffin	709	35.6	
Liberal Reform	John Miller	449	22.5	
Independent Liberal	James Cook	49	2.5	
Total formal votes		1,992	98.9	+0.8
Informal votes		22	1.1	−0.8
Turnout		2,014	69.5	4.0
Progressive hold				
