= Results of the 1889 New South Wales colonial election =

Colonial election for New South Wales, Australia in February 1889

New South Wales colonial election, 1 – 16 February 1889 Legislative Assembly << 1887–1891 >>
Enrolled voters					
Votes cast	150,816		Turnout	59.93	+1.69
Informal votes	2,641		Informal	1.72	−0.02
Summary of votes by party
Party	Primary votes	%	Swing	Seats	Change
Protectionist	77,468	51.37	+18.48	66	+29
Free Trade	73,348	48.63	−12.12	71	−8
Other			–6.36	0	-8
Total	363,554			137	

The 1889 New South Wales colonial election was for 137 members representing 74 electoral districts. The election was conducted on the basis of a simple majority or first-past-the-post voting system. In this election there were 37 multi-member districts returning 100 members. In these multi-member districts each elector could vote for as many candidates as there were vacancies. 10 districts were uncontested. The average number of enrolled voters per seat was 1,955, ranging from Boorowa (1,142) to Canterbury (4,129).

== Election results ==
=== Albury ===
1889 New South Wales colonial election: Albury Saturday 2 February
Party	Candidate	Votes	%	±%
Protectionist	John Wilkinson (elected)	472	51.5	
Protectionist	George Day	445	48.5	
Total formal votes		917	98.4	
Informal votes		15	1.6	
Turnout		932	65.1	
Protectionist hold				

=== Argyle ===
1889 New South Wales colonial election: Argyle Saturday 2 February
Party	Candidate	Votes	%	±%
Free Trade	William Holborow (elected 1)	982	25.9	
Free Trade	Edward Ball (elected 2)	950	25.1	
Protectionist	Thomas Rose	941	24.9	
Protectionist	Solomon Meyer	912	24.1	
Total formal votes		3,785	99.6	
Informal votes		17	0.5	
Turnout		1,910	66.0	
Free Trade hold 2				

=== Balmain ===
1889 New South Wales colonial election: Balmain Saturday 2 February
Party	Candidate	Votes	%	±%
Free Trade	Jacob Garrard (elected 1)	3,177	15.0	
Free Trade	Frank Smith (elected 2)	3,125	14.7	
Free Trade	George Clubb (elected 3)	3,101	14.6	
Free Trade	John Hawthorne (elected 4)	3,083	14.5	
Protectionist	Solomon Hyam	2,291	10.8	
Protectionist	William Inglis	2,178	10.3	
Protectionist	David Buchanan	2,130	10.0	
Protectionist	William Hutchinson	2,120	10.0	
Total formal votes		21,205	99.6	
Informal votes		87	0.4	
Turnout		5,566	61.0	
Free Trade hold 4				

=== Balranald ===
1889 New South Wales colonial election: Balranald Monday 28 January
Party	Candidate	Votes	%	±%
Protectionist	Allen Lakeman (elected)	unopposed		
Free Trade	Robert Wilkinson (elected)	unopposed		
Member changed to Protectionist from Ind. Protectionist				
Member changed to Free Trade from Ind. Free Trade				

=== Bathurst ===
1889 New South Wales colonial election: Bathurst Saturday 2 February
Party	Candidate	Votes	%	±%
Free Trade	William Paul (elected)	736	52.3	
Protectionist	Francis Suttor	672	47.7	
Total formal votes		1,408	98.8	
Informal votes		17	1.2	
Turnout		1,425	72.8	
Free Trade hold				

=== The Bogan ===
1889 New South Wales colonial election: The Bogan Wednesday 13 February
Party	Candidate	Votes	%	±%
Protectionist	George Cass (elected 1)	1,436	19.0	
Protectionist	William Alison (elected 2)	1,402	18.6	
Free Trade	William A'Beckett (elected 3)	1,394	18.5	
Protectionist	John Ryrie	1,281	17.0	
Protectionist	John Kelly (defeated)	1,066	14.1	
Free Trade	Julius Caro	970	12.9	
Total formal votes		7,549	99.6	
Informal votes		31	0.4	
Turnout		2,815	53.1	
Protectionist win 1 and gain 1 from Free Trade		(1 new seat)		
Free Trade hold 1		(1 new seat)		

=== Boorowa ===
1889 New South Wales colonial election: Boorowa Tuesday 29 January
Party	Candidate	Votes	%	±%
Protectionist	Thomas Slattery (elected)	unopposed		
Protectionist hold				

=== Bourke ===
1889 New South Wales colonial election: Bourke Wednesday 13 February
Party	Candidate	Votes	%	±%
Protectionist	Thomas Waddell (elected 1)	1,510	27.4	
Protectionist	William Willis (elected 2)	1,198	21.8	
Protectionist	William Davis (elected 3)	1,102	20.0	
Free Trade	George Griffiths	842	15.3	
Protectionist	W Daniell	501	9.1	
Protectionist	Austin O'Grady	349	6.3	
Total formal votes		5,502	99.1	
Informal votes		52	0.9	
Turnout		2,058	37.5	
Protectionist gain 1 from Free Trade, win 1 and 1 member changed from Free Trade		(1 new seat)		

Thomas Waddell had been elected as a Free Trade member at the 1887 election however changed to the Protectionist party for this election.

=== Braidwood ===
1889 New South Wales colonial election: Braidwood Monday 4 February
Party	Candidate	Votes	%	±%
Protectionist	Alexander Ryrie (re-elected)	586	56.8	
Free Trade	John Lingen	446	43.2	
Total formal votes		1,032	97.7	
Informal votes		24	2.3	
Turnout		1,056	65.6	
Protectionist hold				

=== Camden ===
1889 New South Wales colonial election: Camden Saturday 9 February
Party	Candidate	Votes	%	±%
Free Trade	William McCourt (elected 1)	2,083	23.5	
Free Trade	Thomas Garrett (elected 2)	1,722	19.5	
Protectionist	John Kidd (elected 3)	1,714	19.4	
Free Trade	J Hodgson	1,409	15.9	
Protectionist	James Hanrahan	918	10.4	
Protectionist	William Richardson	913	10.3	
Free Trade	John Pidgeon	94	1.1	
Total formal votes		8,853	98.9	
Informal votes		98	1.1	
Turnout		3,419	61.7	
Free Trade hold 2		(1 new seat)		
Protectionist win 1		(1 new seat)		

=== Canterbury ===
1889 New South Wales colonial election: Canterbury Saturday 2 February
Party	Candidate	Votes	%	±%
Free Trade	Joseph Carruthers (elected 1)	6,066	20.6	
Free Trade	John Wheeler (elected 2)	5,658	19.2	
Free Trade	James Wilshire (elected 3)	5,576	18.9	
Free Trade	Alexander Hutchison (elected 4)	5,504	18.7	
Protectionist	John Watkin	2,320	7.9	
Protectionist	Wilfred Blacket	2,207	7.5	
Protectionist	Alexander Ralston	2,120	7.2	
Total formal votes		29,451	99.6	
Informal votes		122	0.4	
Turnout		8,435	51.1	
Free Trade hold 4				

=== Carcoar ===
1889 New South Wales colonial election: Carcoar Saturday 9 February
Party	Candidate	Votes	%	±%
Free Trade	Charles Garland (elected 1)	1,174	27.7	
Free Trade	John Plumb (elected 2)	1,146	27.0	
Protectionist	Denis Donnelly	972	22.9	
Protectionist	Alfred Fremlin	953	22.5	
Total formal votes		4,245	99.5	
Informal votes		23	0.5	
Turnout		2,294	61.5	
Free Trade hold 2				

=== The Clarence ===
1889 New South Wales colonial election: The Clarence Monday 28 January
Party	Candidate	Votes	%	±%
Protectionist	John McFarlane (elected)	unopposed		
Protectionist hold				

=== Central Cumberland ===
1889 New South Wales colonial election: Central Cumberland Saturday 9 February
Party	Candidate	Votes	%	±%
Free Trade	Frank Farnell (elected 1)	3,339	17.1	
Free Trade	John Nobbs (elected 2)	3,222	16.5	
Free Trade	Robert Ritchie (elected 3)	3,143	16.1	
Free Trade	John Linsley (elected 4)	3,040	15.5	
Protectionist	Alban Gee	1,806	9.2	
Protectionist	Nathaniel Bull	1,797	9.2	
Protectionist	Warden Graves	1,622	8.3	
Protectionist	John Thorpe	1,595	8.2	
Total formal votes		19,564	99.6	
Informal votes		84	0.4	
Turnout		5,059	52.2	
Free Trade hold 3 and win 1		(1 new seat)		

David Buchanan (Protectionist) won a seat in a by-election in May 1888 and unsuccessfully contested Balmain.

=== Durham ===
1889 New South Wales colonial election: Durham Saturday 16 February
Party	Candidate	Votes	%	±%
Free Trade	Herbert Brown (elected)	626	56.5	
Protectionist	John Wade	482	43.5	
Total formal votes		1,108	97.5	
Informal votes		29	2.6	
Turnout		1,137	72.1	
Free Trade hold				

=== East Macquarie ===
1889 New South Wales colonial election: East Macquarie Saturday 16 February
Party	Candidate	Votes	%	±%
Free Trade	James Tonkin (re-elected 1)	945	35.6	
Free Trade	Sydney Smith (re-elected 2)	938	35.4	
Protectionist	Francis Suttor	770	29.0	
Total formal votes		2,653	99.6	
Informal votes		12	0.5	
Turnout		1,691	64.9	
Free Trade hold 2				

=== East Maitland ===
1889 New South Wales colonial election: East Maitland Saturday 2 February
Party	Candidate	Votes	%	±%
Free Trade	James Brunker (elected)	unopposed		
Free Trade hold				

=== East Sydney ===
1889 New South Wales colonial election: East Sydney Saturday 2 February
Party	Candidate	Votes	%	±%
Free Trade	Sydney Burdekin (elected 1)	3,894	20.1	
Free Trade	George Reid (elected 2)	3,631	18.7	
Free Trade	William McMillan (elected 3)	3,604	18.6	
Free Trade	John Street (elected 4)	3,402	17.5	
Protectionist	Joseph Palmer Abbott	2,503	12.9	
Protectionist	Thomas O'Mara	2,378	12.3	
Total formal votes		19,412	99.8	
Informal votes		33	0.2	
Turnout		6,647	61.0	
Free Trade hold 4				

Joseph Palmer Abbott was nominated for both East Sydney and Wentworth, however he was elected unopposed for Wentworth before the poll for East Sydney.

=== Eden ===
1889 New South Wales colonial election: Eden Saturday 2 February
Party	Candidate	Votes	%	±%
Protectionist	Henry Clarke (elected 1)	1,647	45.1	
Protectionist	James Garvan (elected 2)	1,457	39.9	
Free Trade	Nicholas Downing	545	14.9	
Total formal votes		3,649	99.4	
Informal votes		22	0.6	
Turnout		2,041	58.0	
Protectionist hold 2				

=== Forbes ===
1889 New South Wales colonial election: Forbes Wednesday 13 February
Party	Candidate	Votes	%	±%
Free Trade	Henry Cooke (elected 1)	730	27.1	
Protectionist	Alfred Stokes (elected 2)	715	26.6	
Protectionist	George Hutchinson	682	25.3	
Free Trade	Francis Cotton	565	21.0	
Total formal votes		2,692	99.6	
Informal votes		10	0.4	
Turnout		1,531	61.3	
Free Trade hold 1				
Protectionist hold 1				

=== The Glebe ===
1889 New South Wales colonial election: The Glebe Saturday 2 February
Party	Candidate	Votes	%	±%
Free Trade	Bruce Smith (elected 1)	1,654	30.7	
Free Trade	Michael Chapman (elected 2)	1,630	30.2	
Protectionist	Michael Conlon	1,103	20.5	
Protectionist	Percy Lucas	1,007	18.7	
Total formal votes		5,394	99.0	
Informal votes		57	1.1	
Turnout		3,071	71.9	
Free Trade hold 2				

=== Glen Innes ===
1889 New South Wales colonial election: Glen Innes Saturday 16 February
Party	Candidate	Votes	%	±%
Protectionist	Francis Wright (elected 1)	671	31.2	
Protectionist	Alexander Hutchison (elected 2)	578	26.9	
Protectionist	William Fergusson	478	22.2	
Free Trade	Walter Vivian	423	19.7	
Total formal votes		2,150	99.1	
Informal votes		19	0.9	
Turnout		1,375	59.8	
Protectionist win 1 and gain 1 from Free Trade		(1 new seat)		

The sitting member George Matheson (Free Trade) did not contest the election.

=== Gloucester ===
1889 New South Wales colonial election: Gloucester Saturday 16 February
Party	Candidate	Votes	%	±%
Free Trade	Jonathan Seaver (elected)	369	36.0	
Protectionist	Richard Price	360	35.2	
Free Trade	John Hart	295	28.8	
Total formal votes		1,024	98.8	
Informal votes		12	1.2	
Turnout		1,036	58.5	
Free Trade hold				

=== Goulburn ===
1889 New South Wales colonial election: Goulburn Saturday 2 February
Party	Candidate	Votes	%	±%
Free Trade	William Teece (elected)	889	58.6	
Protectionist	John Osborne	629	41.4	
Total formal votes		1,518	99.0	
Informal votes		15	1.0	
Turnout		1,533	66.1	
Free Trade hold				

=== Grafton ===
1889 New South Wales colonial election: Grafton Monday 4 February
Party	Candidate	Votes	%	±%
Protectionist	John See (elected)	955	71.2	
Protectionist	Richard Becher	386	28.8	
Total formal votes		1,341	98.0	
Informal votes		28	2.1	
Turnout		1,369	59.9	
Protectionist hold				

=== Grenfell ===
1889 New South Wales colonial election: Grenfell Monday 4 February
Party	Candidate	Votes	%	±%
Free Trade	George Greene (elected)	475	52.3	
Protectionist	Robert Vaughn	433	47.7	
Total formal votes		908	98.8	
Informal votes		11	1.2	
Turnout		919	52.0	
Free Trade gain from Protectionist				

=== Gundagai ===
1889 New South Wales colonial election: Gundagai Saturday 9 February
Party	Candidate	Votes	%	±%
Protectionist	John Barnes (elected)	686	54.1	
Protectionist	John McLaughlin	582	45.9	
Total formal votes		1,268	97.7	
Informal votes		30	2.3	
Turnout		1,298	58.4	
Protectionist gain from Ind. Free Trade				

The sitting member Jack Want (Independent Free Trade) did not contest the election, having been elected for Paddington on 2 February.

=== Gunnedah ===
1889 New South Wales colonial election: Gunnedah Saturday 9 February
Party	Candidate	Votes	%	±%
Free Trade	Edwin Turner (elected)	658	58.2	
Protectionist	Harold Tilley	472	41.8	
Total formal votes		1,130	95.4	
Informal votes		55	4.6	
Turnout		1,185	59.8	
Free Trade gain from Protectionist				

Edwin Turner (Free Trade) won the seat at a by-election in 1888 and retained it at this election.

=== The Gwydir ===
1889 New South Wales colonial election: The Gwydir Monday 28 January
Party	Candidate	Votes	%	±%
Protectionist	Thomas Hassall (elected)	unopposed		
Protectionist hold				

=== Hartley ===
1889 New South Wales colonial election: Hartley Saturday 9 February
Party	Candidate	Votes	%	±%
Free Trade	John Hurley (elected)	707	48.9	
Protectionist	J P T Caulfield	537	37.1	
Protectionist	Richard Inch	203	14.0	
Total formal votes		1,447	98.0	
Informal votes		29	2.0	
Turnout		1,476	61.5	
Free Trade hold				

=== The Hastings and Manning ===
1889 New South Wales colonial election: The Hastings and Manning Saturday 9 February
Party	Candidate	Votes	%	±%
Free Trade	James Young (elected 1)	1,065	25.3	
Free Trade	Charles Roberts (elected 2)	1,063	25.2	
Protectionist	Hugh McKinnon	1,044	24.8	
Protectionist	John Ruthven	1,040	24.7	
Total formal votes		4,212	99.6	
Informal votes		19	0.5	
Turnout		2,166	69.5	
Free Trade hold 2				

=== The Hawkesbury ===
1889 New South Wales colonial election: The Hawkesbury Saturday 16 February
Party	Candidate	Votes	%	±%
Free Trade	Alexander Bowman (elected)	1,151	67.8	
Protectionist	Thomas Rose	548	32.3	
Total formal votes		1,699	98.5	
Informal votes		26	1.5	
Turnout		1,725	69.7	
Free Trade hold				

=== The Hume ===
1889 New South Wales colonial election: The Hume Monday 28 January
Party	Candidate	Votes	%	±%
Protectionist	William Lyne (elected)	unopposed		
Protectionist	James Hayes (elected)	unopposed		
Protectionist hold 2				

=== The Hunter ===
1889 New South Wales colonial election: The Hunter Saturday 9 February
Party	Candidate	Votes	%	±%
Free Trade	Robert Scobie (elected)	605	53.2	
Protectionist	William Turner	533	46.8	
Total formal votes		1,138	97.9	
Informal votes		25	2.2	
Turnout		1,163	71.5	
Free Trade hold				

=== Illawarra ===
1889 New South Wales colonial election: Illawarra Saturday 9 February
Party	Candidate	Votes	%	±%
Free Trade	Francis Woodward (elected 1)	1,140	31.2	
Free Trade	Joseph Mitchell (elected 2)	973	26.6	
Protectionist	Andrew Lysaght Sr.	814	22.3	
Protectionist	Frederic Jones	420	11.5	
Protectionist	William Wiley	309	8.5	
Total formal votes		3,656	98.8	
Informal votes		44	1.2	
Turnout		1,871	59.0	
Free Trade hold 1 and win 1		(1 new seat)		

=== Inverell ===
1889 New South Wales colonial election: Inverell Saturday 9 February
Party	Candidate	Votes	%	±%
Protectionist	George Cruickshank (elected)	847	65.0	
Free Trade	Alexander Riddel	456	35.0	
Total formal votes		1,303	98.4	
Informal votes		21	1.6	
Turnout		1,324	56.7	
Protectionist gain from Free Trade				

The sitting member Samuel Moore (Free Trade) did not contest the election.

=== Kiama ===
1889 New South Wales colonial election: Kiama Saturday 9 February
Party	Candidate	Votes	%	±%
Free Trade	George Fuller (elected)	528	47.2	
Free Trade	John Cole	495	44.2	
Protectionist	John Roseby	96	8.6	
Total formal votes		1,119	98.2	
Informal votes		21	1.8	
Turnout		1,140	69.1	
Free Trade hold				

=== The Macleay ===
1889 New South Wales colonial election: The Macleay Saturday 16 February
Party	Candidate	Votes	%	±%
Protectionist	Patrick Hogan (elected 1)	1,201	34.5	
Protectionist	Otho Dangar (elected 2)	1,145	32.9	
Free Trade	Charles Jeanneret	272	7.8	
Free Trade	Edmund Woodhouse	208	6.0	
Protectionist	Phillip Hill	204	5.9	
Protectionist	Alfred Salmon	196	5.6	
Protectionist	Enoch Rudder	139	4.0	
Protectionist	Frederick Panton	118	3.4	
Total formal votes		3,483	98.7	
Informal votes		46	1.3	
Turnout		1,993	55.6	
Protectionist hold 1 and win 1		(1 new seat)		

Charles Jeanneret (Free Trade) was the sitting member for Carcoar.

=== Molong ===
1889 New South Wales colonial election: Molong Monday 28 January
Party	Candidate	Votes	%	±%
Protectionist	Andrew Ross (elected)	unopposed		
Total formal votes		25,142	99.8	
Informal votes		47	0.2	
Turnout		6,977	61.2	
Member changed to Protectionist from Ind. Protectionist				

=== Monaro ===
1889 New South Wales colonial election: Monaro Thursday 7 February
Party	Candidate	Votes	%	±%
Protectionist	Henry Dawson (re-elected 1)	1,294	41.8	
Protectionist	Harold Stephen (elected 2)	1,033	33.3	
Free Trade	David Myers	771	24.9	
Total formal votes		3,098	99.6	
Informal votes		12	0.4	
Turnout		3,110	42.9	
Protectionist hold 1 and gain 1 from Ind. Protectionist				

One of the sitting members Thomas O'Mara (Independent Protectionist) unsuccessfully contested East Sydney. The other sitting member was Henry Dawson (Protectionist).

=== Morpeth ===
1889 New South Wales colonial election: Morpeth Saturday 9 February
Party	Candidate	Votes	%	±%
Protectionist	Myles McRae (elected)	375	37.5	
Protectionist	John Bowes	356	35.6	
Free Trade	John Clarke	270	27.0	
Total formal votes		1,001	98.8	
Informal votes		12	1.2	
Turnout		1,013	77.2	
Protectionist hold				

John Bowes (Protectionist) was the sitting member for Morpeth.

=== Mudgee ===
1889 New South Wales colonial election: Mudgee Saturday 9 February
Party	Candidate	Votes	%	±%
Free Trade	Reginald Black (elected 1)	1,338	18.5	
Protectionist	William Wall (elected 2)	1,302	18.0	
Free Trade	John Haynes (elected 3)	1,206	16.7	
Protectionist	G Townsend	1,177	16.3	
Free Trade	Dr Kelly	1,112	15.4	
Protectionist	Thomas Browne	1,098	15.2	
Total formal votes		7,233	99.7	
Informal votes		25	0.3	
Turnout		2,509	63.1	
Free Trade hold 2				
Protectionist hold 1				

Thomas Browne (Protectionist) was a sitting member for Wentworth.

=== The Murray ===
1889 New South Wales colonial election: The Murray Monday 28 January
Party	Candidate	Votes	%	±%
Protectionist	John Chanter (elected 2)	unopposed		
Protectionist	Robert Barbour (elected 1)	unopposed		
Protectionist hold 2				

=== The Murrumbidgee ===
1889 New South Wales colonial election: The Murrumbidgee Friday 1 February
Party	Candidate	Votes	%	±%
Protectionist	James Gormly (elected 1)	2,711	31.5	
Protectionist	George Dibbs (elected 2)	2,078	24.1	
Protectionist	David Copland (elected 3)	2,070	24.0	
Free Trade	Alexander Smith	1,013	11.8	
Free Trade	Alfred Miller	649	7.5	
Free Trade	George Wilson	98	1.1	
Total formal votes		8,619	99.3	
Informal votes		61	0.7	
Turnout		3,391	44.8	
Protectionist hold 2				
Member changed to Protectionist from Ind. Free Trade				

=== The Namoi ===
1889 New South Wales colonial election: The Namoi Wednesday 13 February
Party	Candidate	Votes	%	±%
Free Trade	Thomas Dangar (elected)	733	61.2	
Protectionist	William Buchanan	464	38.8	
Total formal votes		1,197	97.0	
Informal votes		37	3.0	
Turnout		1,234	41.6	
Free Trade hold				

=== The Nepean ===
1889 New South Wales colonial election: The Nepean Saturday 9 February
Party	Candidate	Votes	%	±%
Free Trade	Samuel Lees (elected)	1,068	61.8	
Protectionist	Thomas Smith	661	38.2	
Total formal votes		1,729	98.9	
Informal votes		19	1.1	
Turnout		1,748	69.5	
Free Trade hold				

=== New England ===
1889 New South Wales colonial election: New England Monday 4 February
Party	Candidate	Votes	%	±%
Protectionist	Henry Copeland (elected 1)	1,396	34.9	
Free Trade	James Inglis (elected 2)	1,099	27.4	
Protectionist	William Proctor	1,052	26.3	
Protectionist	Charles Givney	459	11.5	
Total formal votes		4,006	99.2	
Informal votes		31	0.8	
Turnout		3,064	73.6	
Protectionist hold 1				
Free Trade hold 1				

=== Newcastle ===
1889 New South Wales colonial election: Newcastle Saturday 2 February
Party	Candidate	Votes	%	±%
Protectionist	James Fletcher (elected 1)	2,657	19.3	
Protectionist	Alexander Brown (elected 2)	2,620	19.1	
Protectionist	William Grahame (elected 3)	2,452	17.8	
Free Trade	Henry Brown	2,069	15.1	
Free Trade	James Ellis (defeated)	2,050	14.9	
Free Trade	Charles Stokes	1,903	13.8	
Total formal votes		13,751	99.4	
Informal votes		81	0.6	
Turnout		4,767	75.1	
Protectionist hold 1, win 1 and gain 1 from Free Trade		(1 new seat)		

=== Newtown ===
1889 New South Wales colonial election: Newtown Saturday 2 February
Party	Candidate	Votes	%	±%
Free Trade	Joseph Abbott (elected 1)	2,747	21.0	
Free Trade	Edmund Molesworth (elected 2)	2,690	20.6	
Free Trade	Nicholas Hawken (elected 3)	2,634	20.1	
Protectionist	James Smith	1,722	13.2	
Protectionist	Richard Bellemey	1,693	12.9	
Protectionist	James Angus	1,604	12.3	
Total formal votes		13,090	99.4	
Informal votes		80	0.6	
Turnout		4,909	69.0	
Free Trade hold 3				

=== Northumberland ===
1889 New South Wales colonial election: Northumberland Monday 4 February
Party	Candidate	Votes	%	±%
Protectionist	Joseph Creer (elected 1)	3,433	31.5	
Protectionist	Ninian Melville (elected 2)	3,403	31.3	
Protectionist	Thomas Walker (elected 3)	3,257	29.9	
Free Trade	Josiah Wright	791	7.3	
Total formal votes		10,884	99.4	
Informal votes		62	0.6	
Turnout		4,245	64.7	
Protectionist hold 2				
Member changed to Protectionist from Ind. Protectionist				

=== Orange ===
1889 New South Wales colonial election: Orange Saturday 2 February
Party	Candidate	Votes	%	±%
Protectionist	Thomas Dalton (elected 1)	1,072	27.7	
Protectionist	James Torpy (elected 2)	1,055	27.2	
Free Trade	William Clarke	911	23.5	
Free Trade	H Woodhouse	836	21.6	
Total formal votes		3,874	99.4	
Informal votes		25	0.6	
Turnout		2,038	74.5	
Protectionist hold 1 and gain 1 from Free Trade				

=== Paddington ===
1889 New South Wales colonial election: Paddington Saturday 2 February
Party	Candidate	Votes	%	±%
Free Trade	Jack Want (elected 1)	3,209	15.8	
Free Trade	Alfred Allen (elected 2)	2,949	14.5	
Free Trade	John Shepherd (elected 3)	2,520	12.4	
Free Trade	Robert King (elected 4)	2,220	10.9	
Protectionist	John McLaughlin	2,139	10.5	
Protectionist	William Allen	1,886	9.3	
Protectionist	John Neild	1,806	8.9	
Protectionist	John Walsh	1,798	8.9	
Protectionist	Robert Watkins	1,761	8.7	
Total formal votes		20,288	98.8	
Informal votes		245	1.2	
Turnout		5,670	61.0	
Free Trade hold 3 and win 1		(1 new seat)		

William Allen (Protectionist) had won a seat at a by-election in 1888 however was unable to retain it at this election. John Neild had been elected as a Free Trade member in 1887 however changed to the Protectionist party for this election.

=== Parramatta ===
1889 New South Wales colonial election: Parramatta Saturday 9 February
Party	Candidate	Votes	%	±%
Free Trade	Hugh Taylor (elected)	1,022	72.64	
Protectionist	Charles Byrnes	385	27.36	
Total formal votes		1,407	97.98	
Informal votes		29	2.02	
Turnout		1,436	63.29	
Free Trade hold				

=== Patrick's Plains ===
1889 New South Wales colonial election: Patrick's Plains Saturday 9 February
Party	Candidate	Votes	%	±%
Free Trade	Albert Gould (elected)	667	51.8	
Protectionist	William Browne	620	48.2	
Total formal votes		1,287	99.1	
Informal votes		12	0.9	
Turnout		1,299	72.4	
Free Trade hold				

=== Queanbeyan ===
1889 New South Wales colonial election: Queanbeyan Saturday 2 February
Party	Candidate	Votes	%	±%
Protectionist	Edward O'Sullivan (elected)	698	65.3	
Free Trade	Andrew Cunningham	371	34.7	
Total formal votes		1,069	98.4	
Informal votes		17	1.6	
Turnout		1,086	63.6	
Protectionist hold				

=== Redfern ===
1889 New South Wales colonial election: Redfern Saturday 2 February
Party	Candidate	Votes	%	±%
Free Trade	John Sutherland (elected 1)	2,988	13.8	
Protectionist	Peter Howe (elected 2)	2,896	13.3	
Free Trade	William Stephen (elected 3)	2,574	11.9	
Protectionist	Charles Goodchap (elected 4)	2,528	11.6	
Protectionist	David Davis	2,480	11.4	
Protectionist	Thomas Williamson	2,429	11.2	
Free Trade	George Anderson	2,414	11.1	
Free Trade	John Beveridge	2,397	11.0	
Protectionist	William Schey	1,023	4.7	
Total formal votes		21,729	98.5	
Informal votes		323	1.5	
Turnout		6,035	64.7	
Protectionist gain 2 from Free Trade				
Free Trade hold 2				

Peter Howe (Protectionist) won a seat at a by-election in 1888 and retained it at this election. William Schey had been elected as a Free Trade member in Redfern however changed to the Protectionist party for this election.

=== The Richmond ===
1889 New South Wales colonial election: The Richmond Wednesday 13 February
Party	Candidate	Votes	%	±%
Protectionist	Thomas Ewing (elected 1)	2,862	33.3	
Protectionist	Bruce Nicoll (elected 2)	2,525	29.4	
Protectionist	John Perry (elected 3)	1,973	23.0	
Protectionist	William Bourke	1,231	14.3	
Total formal votes		8,591	99.7	
Informal votes		24	0.3	
Turnout		3,262	55.0	
Protectionist hold 2 and win 1		(1 new seat)		

=== Shoalhaven ===
1889 New South Wales colonial election: Shoalhaven Wednesday 13 February
Party	Candidate	Votes	%	±%
Free Trade	Philip Morton (elected)	1,233	68.4	
Protectionist	William Lovegrove	569	31.6	
Total formal votes		1,802	98.4	
Informal votes		30	1.6	
Turnout		1,832	73.3	
Free Trade hold				

=== South Sydney ===
1889 New South Wales colonial election: South Sydney Saturday 2 February
Party	Candidate	Votes	%	±%
Protectionist	William Traill (elected 1)	3,036	13.0	
Protectionist	Walter Edmunds (elected 2)	2,996	12.9	
Protectionist	James Toohey (re-elected 3)	2,934	12.6	
Free Trade	James Martin (elected 4)	2,918	12.5	
Protectionist	John Wright	2,912	12.5	
Free Trade	Bernhard Wise (defeated)	2,899	12.4	
Free Trade	Alban Riley (defeated)	2,824	12.1	
Free Trade	George Pile	2,805	12.0	
Total formal votes		23,324	99.9	
Informal votes		35	0.2	
Turnout		5,819	60.9	
Protectionist hold 1 and gain 2 from Free Trade				
Free Trade hold 1				

=== St Leonards ===
1889 New South Wales colonial election: St Leonards Saturday 2 February
Party	Candidate	Votes	%	±%
Free Trade	Sir Henry Parkes (elected 1)	2,221	27.3	
Free Trade	Joseph Cullen (elected 2)	1,922	23.6	
Free Trade	John Burns (elected 3)	1,575	19.3	
Free Trade	Edward Clark	1,372	16.8	
Protectionist	J Griffin	1,057	13.0	
Total formal votes		8,147	99.1	
Informal votes		78	1.0	
Turnout		3,708	58.4	
Free Trade hold 2 and win 1		(1 new seat)		

=== Sturt ===
1889 New South Wales colonial election: Sturt Wednesday 13 February
Party	Candidate	Votes	%	±%
Protectionist	Wyman Brown (elected)	654	72.7	
Protectionist	Charles O'Neill	246	27.3	
Total formal votes		900	97.9	
Informal votes		19	2.1	
Turnout		919	31.4	
Protectionist win		(new seat)		

Sturt and Wilcannia were new seats split off from Wentworth which previously returned two members.

=== Tamworth ===
1889 New South Wales colonial election: Tamworth Monday 4 February
Party	Candidate	Votes	%	±%
Protectionist	Robert Levien (elected 1)	1,011	35.3	
Protectionist	William Dowel (elected 2)	995	34.8	
Free Trade	William Tribe	855	29.9	
Total formal votes		2,861	99.4	
Informal votes		16	0.6	
Turnout		1,774	51.1	
Protectionist hold 2				

=== Tenterfield ===
1889 New South Wales colonial election: Tenterfield Saturday 16 February
Party	Candidate	Votes	%	±%
Free Trade	Charles Lee (elected)	692	53.3	
Protectionist	Richard Stuart	606	46.7	
Total formal votes		1,298	98.2	
Informal votes		24	1.8	
Turnout		1,322	52.9	
Free Trade hold				

=== Tumut ===
1889 New South Wales colonial election: Tumut Saturday 2 February
Party	Candidate	Votes	%	±%
Protectionist	Travers Jones (elected)	692	58.9	
Free Trade	Walter Vivian	482	41.1	
Total formal votes		1,174	98.2	
Informal votes		21	1.8	
Turnout		1,195	67.6	
Protectionist hold				

=== The Upper Hunter ===
1889 New South Wales colonial election: The Upper Hunter Monday 4 February
Party	Candidate	Votes	%	±%
Protectionist	Robert Fitzgerald (elected 1)	925	38.9	
Protectionist	William Abbott (elected 2)	831	35.0	
Protectionist	Thomas Hungerford	620	26.1	
Total formal votes		2,376	99.5	
Informal votes		13	0.5	
Turnout		1,495	49.1	
Protectionist hold 1 and gain 1 from Free Trade				

One of the sitting members John McElhone (Free Trade) did not contest the election. Robert Fitzgerald (Protectionist) was the other sitting member

=== Wellington ===
1889 New South Wales colonial election: Wellington Saturday 2 February
Party	Candidate	Votes	%	±%
Protectionist	David Ferguson (elected)	454	53.4	
Free Trade	H Montagu	318	37.4	
Protectionist	Michael O'Halloran	78	9.2	
Total formal votes		850	96.7	
Informal votes		29	3.3	
Turnout		879	56.6	
Protectionist hold				

=== Wentworth ===
1889 New South Wales colonial election: Wentworth Thursday 31 January
Party	Candidate	Votes	%	±%
Protectionist	Joseph Palmer Abbott (elected)	unopposed		
Protectionist hold				

Wentworth previously returned two members, however it was split, with two new seats, Sturt and Wilcannia. One sitting member for Wentworth Joseph Palmer Abbott (Protectionist) was nominated for both Wentworth and East Sydney. The other member for Wentworth was Thomas Browne (Protectionist) who unsuccessfully contested Mudgee.

=== West Macquarie ===
1889 New South Wales colonial election: West Macquarie Saturday 16 February
Party	Candidate	Votes	%	±%
Protectionist	Paddy Crick (elected)	470	55.1	
Free Trade	Bernhard Wise	383	44.9	
Total formal votes		853	98.2	
Informal votes		16	1.8	
Turnout		869	73.2	
Protectionist gain from Free Trade				

=== West Maitland ===
1889 New South Wales colonial election: West Maitland Saturday 9 February
Party	Candidate	Votes	%	±%
Free Trade	Richard Thompson (elected)	754	69.2	
Protectionist	Thomas Hungerford	335	30.8	
Total formal votes		1,089	98.1	
Informal votes		21	1.9	
Turnout		1,110	59.6	
Free Trade hold				

=== West Sydney ===
1889 New South Wales colonial election: West Sydney Saturday 2 February
Party	Candidate	Votes	%	±%
Free Trade	Thomas Playfair (elected 1)	3,896	15.5	
Free Trade	Daniel O'Connor (elected 2)	3,697	14.7	
Free Trade	Francis Abigail (elected 3)	3,678	14.6	
Free Trade	Alfred Lamb (elected 4)	3,552	14.1	
Protectionist	John Young	2,788	11.1	
Protectionist	Arthur Nelson	2,566	10.2	
Protectionist	Francis Freehill	2,549	10.1	
Protectionist	John Wearne	2,416	9.6	
Total formal votes		25,142	99.8	
Informal votes		47	0.2	
Turnout		6,977	61.2	
Free Trade hold 4				

=== Wilcannia ===
1889 New South Wales colonial election: Wilcannia Wednesday 13 February
Party	Candidate	Votes	%	±%
Protectionist	Edward Dickens (elected)	209	68.3	
Free Trade	Charles Fartiere	97	31.7	
Total formal votes		306	97.8	
Informal votes		7	2.2	
Turnout		313	25.6	
Protectionist win		(new seat)		

Wilcannia and Sturt were new seats split off from Wentworth which previously returned two members.

=== Wollombi ===
1889 New South Wales colonial election: Wollombi Saturday 9 February
Party	Candidate	Votes	%	±%
Protectionist	Richard Stevenson (elected)	652	64.2	
Free Trade	Fred Walsh	363	35.8	
Total formal votes		1,015	98.5	
Informal votes		16	1.6	
Turnout		1,031	45.7	
Member changed to Protectionist from Free Trade				

=== Yass Plains ===
1889 New South Wales colonial election: Yass Plains Monday 28 January
Party	Candidate	Votes	%	±%
Protectionist	Thomas Colls (re-elected)	unopposed		
Total formal votes		1,015	98.5	
Informal votes		16	1.6	
Turnout		1,031	45.7	
Protectionist hold				

=== Young ===
1889 New South Wales colonial election: Young Saturday 9 February
Party	Candidate	Votes	%	±%
Protectionist	John Gough (elected 1)	931	24.8	
Protectionist	James Mackinnon (elected 2)	917	24.5	
Free Trade	James Gordon	902	24.1	
Free Trade	William Lucas	512	13.7	
Protectionist	John Miller	487	13.0	
Total formal votes		3,749	98.9	
Informal votes		40	1.1	
Turnout		2,287	69.5	
Protectionist win 1 and gain 1 from Free Trade				

== See also ==
- Candidates of the 1889 New South Wales colonial election
- Members of the New South Wales Legislative Assembly, 1889–1891
