= Candidates of the 1889 New South Wales colonial election =

This is a list of candidates for the 1889 New South Wales colonial election. The election was held from 1 February to 16 February 1889.

== Retiring Members ==
=== Protectionist ===
- Frederick Crouch MLA (Richmond)
- John Gale MLA (Murray)
- Robert Smith MLA (Macleay)

=== Free Trade ===
- Angus Cameron MLA (Kiama)
- William Cortis MLA (Bathurst)
- William Davis MLA (Canterbury)
- William Henson MLA (Canterbury)
- Isaac Ives MLA (St Leonards)
- Alexander Kethel MLA (West Sydney)
- William Martin MLA (Shoalhaven)
- George Matheson MLA (Glen Innes)
- John McElhone MLA (Upper Hunter)
- George Merriman MLA (West Sydney)
- Samuel Moore MLA (Inverell)
- Joseph Penzer MLA (Bogan)
- Fergus Smith MLA (West Macquarie)
- William Wilkinson MLA (Glebe)
- Alexander Wilson MLA (Bourke)
- George Withers MLA (South Sydney)

== Legislative Assembly ==
Sitting members are shown in bold text. Successful candidates are highlighted in the relevant colour and marked with an asterisk (*).

Electorates are arranged chronologically from the day the poll was held. Because of the sequence of polling, some sitting members who were defeated in their constituencies were then able to contest other constituencies later in the polling period. On the second occasion, these members are shown in italic text.

Electorate	Held by	Protectionist candidates	Free Trade candidates
Friday 1 February 1889
Murrumbidgee	3 Protectionist	David Copland*; **George Dibbs***; **James Gormly***	Alfred Miller; Alexander Smith; George Wilson
Saturday 2 February 1889
Albury	Protectionist	**George Day**; John Wilkinson*	
Argyle	2 Free Trade	Solomon Meyer; Thomas Rose	**Edward Ball***; **William Holborow***
Balmain	3 Free Trade; 1 New	**David Buchanan**; William Hutchinson; Solomon Hyam; William Inglis	George Clubb*; **Jacob Garrard***; **John Hawthorne***; **Frank Smith***
Bathurst	Free Trade	Francis Suttor	William Paul*
Boorowa	Protectionist	**Thomas Slattery***	
Canterbury	4 Free Trade	Wilfred Blacket; Alexander Ralston; John Watkin	**Joseph Carruthers***; **Alexander Hutchison***; John Wheeler*; James Wilshire*
East Sydney	4 Free Trade	Joseph Abbott; **Thomas O'Mara**	**Sydney Burdekin***; **William McMillan***; **George Reid***; **John Street***
Eden	2 Protectionist	**Henry Clarke***; **James Garvan***	Nicholas Downing
Glebe	2 Free Trade	Michael Conlon; Percy Lucas	**Michael Chapman***; Bruce Smith*
Goulburn	Free Trade	John Osborne	**William Teece***
Molong	Protectionist	**Andrew Ross***	
Newcastle	1 Protectionist; 1 Free Trade; 1 New	Alexander Brown*; **James Fletcher***; William Grahame*	Henry Brown; **James Ellis**; Charles Stokes
Newtown	3 Free Trade	James Angus; Richard Bellemey; James Smith	**Joseph Abbott***; **Nicholas Hawken***; Edmund Molesworth*
Orange	1 Protectionist; 1 Free Trade	**Thomas Dalton***; James Torpy*	**William Clarke**; H M Woodhouse
Paddington	1 Protectionist; 2 Free Trade; 1 New	**William Allen**; John McLaughlin; **John Neild**; John Walsh; Robert Watkins	**Alfred Allen***; Robert King*; John Shepherd*; **Jack Want***
Queanbeyan	Protectionist	**Edward O'Sullivan***	Andrew Cunningham
Redfern	4 Free Trade	David Davis; Charles Goodchap*; **Peter Howe***; **William Schey**; Thomas Williamson	George Anderson; John Beveridge; **William Stephen***; **John Sutherland***
St Leonards	2 Free Trade; 1 New	J G Griffin	**John Burns***; Edward Clark; Joseph Cullen*; **Sir Henry Parkes***
South Sydney	1 Protectionist; 3 Free Trade	Walter Edmunds*; **James Toohey***; William Traill*; John Wright	James Martin*; George Pile; **Alban Riley**; **Bernhard Wise**
Tumut	Protectionist	**Travers Jones***	Walter Vivian
Wellington	Protectionist	**David Ferguson***; Michael O'Halloran	H N Montagu
West Sydney	4 Free Trade	Francis Freehill; Arthur Nelson; John Wearne; John Young	**Francis Abigail***; Alfred Lamb*; **Daniel O'Connor***; Thomas Playfair*
Yass Plains	Protectionist	**Thomas Colls***	
Monday 4 February 1889
Balranald	1 Protectionist; 1 Free Trade	**Allen Lakeman***	**Robert Wilkinson***
Braidwood	Protectionist	**Alexander Ryrie***	John Lingen
Clarence	Protectionist	**John McFarlane***	
East Maitland	Free Trade		**James Brunker***
Grafton	Protectionist	Richard Becher; **John See***	
Grenfell	Protectionist	**Robert Vaughn**	George Greene*
Gwydir	Protectionist	**Thomas Hassall***	
Hume	2 Protectionist	**James Hayes***; **William Lyne***	
Murray	2 Protectionist	**Robert Barbour***; **John Chanter***	
New England	1 Protectionist; 1 Free Trade	**Henry Copeland***; Charles Givney; William Proctor	**James Inglis***
Northumberland	3 Protectionist	**Joseph Creer***; **Ninian Melville***; **Thomas Walker***	Josiah Wright
Tamworth	2 Protectionist	**William Dowel***; **Robert Levien***	William Tribe
Upper Hunter	2 Free Trade	William Abbott*; **Robert Fitzgerald***; Thomas Hungerford	
Thursday 7 February 1889
Monaro	2 Protectionist	**Henry Dawson***; Harold Stephen*	David Myers
Saturday 9 February 1889
Camden	2 Free Trade; 1 New	James Hanrahan; John Kidd*; William Richardson	**Thomas Garrett***; J Hodgson; **William McCourt***; John Pidgeon
Carcoar	2 Free Trade	Denis Donnelly; Alfred Fremlin	**Charles Garland***; John Plumb*
Central Cumberland	1 Protectionist; 2 Free Trade; 1 New	Nathaniel Bull; Alban Gee; Warden Graves; John Thorpe	**Frank Farnell***; John Linsley*; **John Nobbs***; Robert Ritchie*
Gundagai	Free Trade	John Barnes*; John McLaughlin	
Gunnedah	Free Trade	Harold Tilley	**Edwin Turner**
Hartley	Free Trade	J P T Caulfield; Richard Inch	**John Hurley***
Hastings and Manning	2 Free Trade	Hugh McKinnon; John Ruthven	**Charles Roberts***; **James Young***
Hunter	Free Trade	William Turner	Robert Scobie*
Illawarra	1 Free Trade; 1 New	Frederic Jones; Andrew Lysaght; William Wiley	**Joseph Mitchell***; **Francis Woodward***
Inverell	Free Trade	George Cruickshank*	Alexander Riddel
Kiama	Free Trade	John Roseby	Tom Cole; George Fuller*
Morpeth	Protectionist	**John Bowes**; Myles McRae*	John Clarke
Mudgee	1 Protectionist; 2 Free Trade	**Thomas Browne**; G W Townsend; **William Wall***	**Reginald Black***; **John Haynes***; V Kelly
Nepean	Free Trade	Thomas Smith	**Samuel Lees***
Parramatta	Free Trade	Charles Byrnes	**Hugh Taylor***
Patrick's Plains	Free Trade	William Browne	**Albert Gould***
West Maitland	Free Trade	Thomas Hungerford	**Richard Thompson***
Wollombi	Free Trade	**Richard Stevenson***	Fred Walsh
Young	1 Protectionist; 1 Free Trade	John Gough*; **James Mackinnon***; John Miller	**James Gordon**; William Lucas
Wednesday 13 February 1889
Bogan	2 Free Trade; 1 New	William Alison*; George Cass*; **John Kelly**; John Ryrie	William A'Beckett*; Julius Caro
Bourke	2 Free Trade; 1 New	W H Daniell; William Davis*; Austin O'Grady; **Thomas Waddell***; William Willis*	George Griffiths
Forbes	1 Protectionist; 1 Free Trade	George Hutchinson; **Alfred Stokes***	**Henry Cooke***; Francis Cotton
Namoi	Free Trade	William Buchanan	**Thomas Dangar***
Richmond	2 Protectionist	William Bourke; **Thomas Ewing***; Bruce Nicoll*; John Perry*	
Shoalhaven	Free Trade	William Lovegrove	Philip Morton*
Sturt	Protectionist	Wyman Brown*; Charles O'Neill	
Wentworth	Protectionist	**Joseph Abbott***	
Wilcannia	Protectionist	Edward Dickens*	Charles Fartiere
Friday 16 February 1889
Durham	Free Trade	John Wade	**Herbert Brown***
East Macquarie	2 Free Trade	Francis Suttor	**Sydney Smith***; **James Tonkin***
Glen Innes	1 Free Trade; 1 New	William Fergusson; Alexander Hutchison*; Francis Wright*	Walter Vivian
Gloucester	Free Trade	Richard Price	John Hart; **Jonathan Seaver***
Hawkesbury	Free Trade	Thomas Rose	**Alexander Bowman***
Macleay	1 Protectionist; 1 New	Otho Dangar*; Phillip Hill; Patrick Hogan*; Frederick Panton; Enoch Rudder; Alfred Salmon	**Charles Jeanneret**; Edmund Woodhouse
Tenterfield	Free Trade	Richard Stuart	**Charles Lee***
West Macquarie	Free Trade	Paddy Crick	Bernhard Wise

== See also ==
- Members of the New South Wales Legislative Assembly, 1889–1891
