= Electoral results for the district of The Bogan =

Election results for The Bogan, New South Wales, Australia

The Bogan, an electoral district of the Legislative Assembly in the Australian state of New South Wales was created in 1859 and abolished in 1894.

| Election | Member | Party | | | | |
|---|---|---|---|---|---|---|
| 1859 | George Lord | None | | | | |
| 1860 | George Lord | None | | | | |
| 1864–65 | George Lord | None | | | | |
| 1869–70 | George Lord | None | | | | |
| 1872 | George Lord | None | | | | |
| 1874–75 | George Lord | None | | | | |
| 1877 | Walter Coonan | None | Member | Party | | |
| 1880 | Patrick Jennings | None | George Cass | None | | |
| 1882 | Patrick Jennings | None | George Cass | None | | |
| 1885 | Patrick Jennings | None | George Cass | None | | |
| 1887 | John Kelly | Free Trade | Joseph Penzer | Free Trade | Member | Party |
| 1889 | William Alison | Protectionist | William A'Beckett | Free Trade | George Cass | Protectionist |
| 1891 | James Morgan | Labour | Robert Booth | Free Trade | George Cass | Protectionist |
| 1892 by | James Morgan | Labour | Robert Booth | Free Trade | William A'Beckett | Free Trade |

== Election results ==
=== Elections in the 1890s ===
==== 1892 by-election ====
1892 The Bogan by-election Tuesday 31 May
| Party | Candidate | Votes | % | ±% |
|---|---|---|---|---|
| Free Trade | William A'Beckett (elected) | 984 | 37.0 | |
| Protectionist | Michael O'Halloran (Note: Michael O'Halloran was also endorsed as a Labour candidate.) | 874 | 32.9 | |
| Independent | George Plummer | 271 | 10.2 | |
| Independent | William Wilkinson | 271 | 10.2 | |
| Free Trade | John Ryrie | 257 | 9.7 | |
| Total formal votes | | 2,657 | 100.0 | |
| Informal votes | | 0 | 0.0 | |
| Turnout | | 2,657 | 43.5 | |
| Free Trade gain from Protectionist | | | | |

George Cass (Protectionist) died.

==== 1891 ====
1891 New South Wales colonial election: The Bogan Monday 29 June
| Party | Candidate | Votes | % | ±% |
|---|---|---|---|---|
| Labour | James Morgan (elected 1) | 2,286 | 23.1 | |
| Protectionist | George Cass (re-elected 2) | 1,731 | 17.5 | |
| Free Trade | Robert Booth (elected 3) | 1,517 | 15.4 | |
| Free Trade | William A'Beckett (defeated) | 1,158 | 11.7 | |
| Labour | John Prince | 1,011 | 10.2 | |
| Protectionist | William Wilkinson | 942 | 9.5 | |
| Protectionist | Tottenham Richardson | 843 | 8.5 | |
| Free Trade | Francis Conder | 392 | 4.0 | |
| Total formal votes | | 9,880 | 99.1 | |
| Informal votes | | 88 | 0.9 | |
| Turnout | | 3,648 | 59.8 | |
| Labour gain 1 from Protectionist | | | | |
| Protectionist hold 1 | | | | |
| Free Trade hold 1 | | | | |

One of the sitting members, William Alison (Protectionist), did not contest the election.

=== Elections in the 1880s ===
==== 1889 ====
1889 New South Wales colonial election: The Bogan Wednesday 13 February
| Party | Candidate | Votes | % | ±% |
|---|---|---|---|---|
| Protectionist | George Cass (elected 1) | 1,436 | 19.0 | |
| Protectionist | William Alison (elected 2) | 1,402 | 18.6 | |
| Free Trade | William A'Beckett (elected 3) | 1,394 | 18.5 | |
| Protectionist | John Ryrie | 1,281 | 17.0 | |
| Protectionist | John Kelly (defeated) | 1,066 | 14.1 | |
| Free Trade | Julius Caro | 970 | 12.9 | |
| Total formal votes | | 7,549 | 99.6 | |
| Informal votes | | 31 | 0.4 | |
| Turnout | | 2,815 | 53.1 | |
| Protectionist win 1 and gain 1 from Free Trade | | (1 new seat) | | |
| Free Trade hold 1 | | (1 new seat) | | |

==== 1887 ====
1887 New South Wales colonial election: The Bogan Wednesday 23 February
| Party | Candidate | Votes | % | ±% |
|---|---|---|---|---|
| Free Trade | John Kelly (elected 1) | 1,422 | 31.4 | |
| Free Trade | Joseph Penzer (elected 2) | 1,352 | 29.9 | |
| Protectionist | George Cass (defeated) | 1,179 | 26.1 | |
| Protectionist | Rene Berteaux | 570 | 12.6 | |
| Total formal votes | | 4,523 | 99.6 | |
| Informal votes | | 19 | 0.4 | |
| Turnout | | 2,359 | 48.4 | |

==== 1885 ====
1885 New South Wales colonial election: The Bogan Monday 26 October
| Candidate | Votes | % |
|---|---|---|
| George Cass (re-elected 1) | 1,347 | 35.6 |
| Sir Patrick Jennings (re-elected 2) | 1,271 | 33.6 |
| John Kelly | 1,168 | 30.9 |
| Total formal votes | 3,786 | 99.0 |
| Informal votes | 40 | 1.1 |
| Turnout | 2,318 | 50.6 |

==== 1882 ====
1882 New South Wales colonial election: The Bogan Tuesday 19 December
| Candidate | Votes | % |
|---|---|---|
| George Cass (re-elected 1) | 1,152 | 38.6 |
| Sir Patrick Jennings (re-elected 2) | 1,134 | 38.0 |
| William Forlonge | 701 | 23.5 |
| Total formal votes | 2,987 | 98.8 |
| Informal votes | 35 | 1.2 |
| Turnout | 3,022 | 42.7 |

==== 1880 ====
1880 New South Wales colonial election: The Bogan Tuesday 30 November
| Candidate | Votes | % |
|---|---|---|
| Patrick Jennings (elected 1) | 1,394 | 42.1 |
| George Cass (elected 2) | 750 | 22.6 |
| William Forlonge | 671 | 20.3 |
| William Shorter | 498 | 15.0 |
| Total formal votes | 3,313 | 98.8 |
| Informal votes | 42 | 1.3 |
| Turnout | 1,842 | 56.2 |
| | (1 new seat) | |

The Bogan lost part of the district to the new seat of Forbes. The sitting member Walter Coonan unsuccessfully contested Forbes.

=== Elections in the 1870s ===
==== 1877 ====
1877 New South Wales colonial election: The Bogan Monday 12 November
| Candidate | Votes | % |
|---|---|---|
| Walter Coonan (elected) | 1,248 | 51.8 |
| Sir John Robertson | 1,020 | 42.3 |
| Sir Henry Parkes | 117 | 4.9 |
| John Ardill | 12 | 0.5 |
| William Forlonge | 7 | 0.3 |
| Jean Serisier | 5 | 0.2 |
| Total formal votes | 2,409 | 97.1 |
| Informal votes | 72 | 2.9 |
| Turnout | 2,481 | 33.5 |

==== 1874-75 ====
1874–75 New South Wales colonial election: The Bogan Monday 4 January 1875
| Candidate | Votes | % |
|---|---|---|
| George Lord (re-elected) | 1,071 | 64.9 |
| Arthur Burne | 290 | 17.6 |
| John Kelly | 273 | 16.5 |
| John Ardill | 17 | 1.0 |
| Total formal votes | 1,651 | 98.3 |
| Informal votes | 29 | 1.7 |
| Turnout | 1,680 | 32.0 |

==== 1872 ====
1872 New South Wales colonial election: The Bogan Monday 11 March
| Candidate | Votes | % |
|---|---|---|
| George Lord (re-elected) | 943 | 67.3 |
| Jeremiah Rundle | 381 | 27.2 |
| Jean Serisier | 78 | 5.6 |
| Total formal votes | 1,402 | 98.2 |
| Informal votes | 26 | 1.8 |
| Turnout | 1,428 | 42.0 |

=== Elections in the 1860s ===
==== 1869-70 ====
1869–70 New South Wales colonial election: The Bogan Wednesday 22 December 1869
| Candidate | Votes | % |
|---|---|---|
| George Lord (re-elected) | 407 | 64.6 |
| Thomas Manning | 205 | 32.5 |
| John Ardill | 18 | 2.9 |
| Total formal votes | 630 | 100.0 |
| Informal votes | 0 | 0.0 |
| Turnout | 631 | 26.4 |

==== 1864-65 ====
1864–65 New South Wales colonial election: The Bogan Thursday 22 December 1864
| Candidate | Votes | % |
|---|---|---|
| George Lord (re-elected) | unopposed | |

==== 1860 ====
1860 New South Wales colonial election: The Bogan Wednesday 19 December
| Candidate | Votes | % |
|---|---|---|
| George Lord (re-elected) | 93 | 95.9 |
| John Cohen | 4 | 4.1 |
| Total formal votes | 97 | 100.0 |
| Informal votes | 0 | 0.0 |
| Turnout | 209 (Note: Newspaper reports contained incomplete counts of 97 votes, while the 1860 statistical register records 209 people voting.) | 17.6 |

=== Elections in the 1850s ===
==== 1859 ====
1859 New South Wales colonial election: The Bogan Tuesday 5 July
| Candidate | Votes | % |
|---|---|---|
| George Lord (re-elected) | 116 | 95.9 |
| Christopher McRae | 5 | 4.1 |
| Total formal votes | 121 | 100.0 |
| Informal votes | 0 | 0.0 |
| Turnout | 181 | 18.7 |
