= Candidates of the 1894 New South Wales colonial election =

This is a list of candidates for the 1894 New South Wales colonial election. The election was held on 17 July 1894.

This election saw the Assembly reconstituted into single-member constituencies. As such it is impossible to determine which party notionally held each electorate.

== Retiring members ==
=== Protectionist ===
- Robert Barbour MLA (Murray)
- James Torpy MLA (Orange)

=== Free Trade ===
- William A'Beckett MLA (Bogan)
- Robert Booth MLA (Bogan)
- David Dale MLA (Central Cumberland)
- James Eve MLA (Canterbury)
- William Holborow MLA (Argyle)
- James Inglis MLA (New England)
- James Marks MLA (Paddington)
- Bruce Smith MLA (Glebe)
- Robert Wilkinson MLA (Balranald)

=== Independent ===
- Jack Want MLA (Paddington) – Independent Free Trade
- Thomas Williams MLA (Upper Hunter) – Independent Labor

== Legislative Assembly ==
Sitting members are shown in bold text. Successful candidates are highlighted in the relevant colour. Where there is possible confusion, an asterisk (*) is also used.

Electorate	Protectionist candidate	Free Trade candidate	Labor candidate	Other candidates
Albury	**John Wilkinson**	William Hall		
Alma	Thomas Coombe		Josiah Thomas	Charles Pound (Ind)
Annandale	John Young	William Mahony	Alexander Duncan	Thomas Larkin (Ind Prot); William Pritchard (Ind FT)
Argyle	**Thomas Rose**	Henry Gannon		
Armidale	**Henry Copeland**	**Edmund Lonsdale**	George Beeby	
Ashburnham	Alfred Stokes		John Hanney	**Albert Gardiner*** (Ind Lab); **George Hutchinson** (Ind FT); Thomas Spencer (Ind FT)
Ashfield		**Thomas Bavister**	Robert Thomson	Thomas Evans (Ind FT); Mark Hammond (Ind)
Ballina	**John Perry**		Alexander Hill	Samuel Dutton (Ind Prot); George Martin (Ind Prot); Siegfried Sohn (Ind Prot)
Balmain North	**William Murphy**	Bill Wilks	Samuel Kirby	James Wheeler (Ind FT)
Balmain South	**James Johnston**	George Clubb	Sydney Law	George Maclean (Ind FT)
Barwon	**William Willis**	Richard Machattie	Sam Rosa	Patrick Griffin (Ind Prot); Donald Macdonell (Ind Lab); Langloh Parker (Ind FT)
Bathurst	**Francis Suttor**	**Sydney Smith**		James Walker (Ind Lab)
Bega	**James Garvan**	William Neilley		Thomas Rawlinson* (Ind Prot); Peter Wood (Ind FT)
Bingara	**William Dowel**	Samuel Moore		Robert Buist (Ind FT); Herbert Clark (Ind FT); Thomas Jones (Ind Lab)
Boorowa	**Thomas Slattery**		James Toomey	
Botany	Francis Luland		John Dacey	James Macfadyen (Ind FT); William Stephen* (Ind FT)
Bourke	William Davis	Edward Millen		**Hugh Langwell** (Ind Lab)
Bowral	John Walters	**William McCourt**		William Richards (Ind FT); Henry Taylor (Ind FT)
Braidwood	**Austin Chapman**	Adolph Shadler		Alfred Hitchens (Ind FT)
Broken Hill	Wyman Brown		**John Cann**	
Burwood	Frederick Gipps	**William McMillan**	John Quinnen	William Dumbrell (Ind FT); Adam Pringle (Ind FT); Griffith Russell-Jones (Ind FT)
Camden	**John Kidd**	**William Cullen**		Edward Griffiths (Ind Lab)
Canterbury	Thomas Wearne	**Varney Parkes**	James McBean	Thomas Taylor (Ind FT)
Clarence	**John McFarlane**			Nathaniel Collins (Ind Prot)
Cobar	**Thomas Waddell**	Neil Morrison	A Murphy	
Condoublin	Patrick Ryan			Thomas Brown* (Ind Lab); Thomas Browne (Ind Prot); Henry Cooke (Ind FT)
Coonamble	John Hellman		Hugh Macdonald	John Fisher (Ind Prot)
Cowra	**Denis Donnelly**	Hector Lamond	Linus Bungate	
Darlington	David Davis	William Manuell		**William Schey** (Ind Lab)
Deniliquin	**John Chanter**	George Chandler		
Dubbo	**James Morgan**	Simeon Phillips	William Wilkinson	
Durham				**Herbert Brown*** (Ind FT); Charles Duffy (Ind Prot); John Wade (Ind Prot)
East Maitland		**James Brunker**	Peter Curran	
Eden-Bombala		David Myers		Moses Cohen (Ind); Edmund Comans (Ind Prot); Coulson Murphy (Ind Prot); John O'Reilly (Ind); Maurice Roche (Ind Prot); Charles Stiles (Ind); Samuel Woods (Ind Prot); William Wood* (Ind Lab)
Glebe	Michael Conlon	James Hogue	John Clune	William Cary (Ind FT); Arthur Eager (Ind FT); **Thomas Houghton** (Ind Lab)
Glen Innes	**Alexander Hutchison**; **Francis Wright***		John Souter	William Cameron (Ind Prot)
Gloucester	Richard Price	**John Hart**		William Ellingworth (Ind Lab); Donald McKinnon (Ind Prot)
Goulburn	Arthur Barrett	**Leslie Hollis**		Edward Ball (Ind FT)
Grafton	**John See**			William Hawthorne (Ind Prot); Edmund Hockey (Ind Prot)
Granville	William Ewart	**George McCredie**	George Smailes	Thomas Castle (Ind Prot); John Ferguson (Ind FT); John Nobbs (Ind FT)
Grenfell	**Robert Vaughn**	George Greene	Michael Loughnane	John Williams (Ind)
Gundagai	**John Barnes**	Frederick Pinkstone		Robert McCook (Ind Lab); Richard Ramsden (Ind FT)
Gunnedah	**Job Sheldon**		**John Kirkpatrick**	George Birney (Ind Prot); Jonathan Rendalls (Ind FT); Silas Rose (Ind FT)
Hartley	William Richardson		John Henry	**Joseph Cook*** (Ind Lab); **George Donald** (Ind Lab); John Hurley (Ind FT)
Hastings and Macleay	**Francis Clarke**	Walter Vivian	Henry Stuart	Otho Dangar (Ind Prot); Enoch Rudder (Ind Prot)
Hawkesbury	Thomas Bennett	**Sydney Burdekin**	Henry Buttsworth	William Morgan (Ind FT)
Hay	**James Newton**	James Ashton		Charles Broom (Ind); Allen Lakeman (Ind Prot); George Mair (Ind FT)
Hume	**William Lyne**	Hugh Bridson		
Illawarra	Andrew Lysaght	**Archibald Campbell**		
Inverell	**George Cruickshank**			
Kahibah			George Errington	William Case (Ind FT); **Alfred Edden*** (Ind Lab); Joseph Gorrick (Ind FT); John Penman (Ind); William Williams (Ind)
Kiama		**George Fuller**		Alexander Campbell (Ind Prot)
Lachlan	John Miller			Alexander Cameron (Ind Prot); James Carroll* (Ind Prot); James Dunsmore (Ind FT); Alexander Huie (Ind FT)
Leichhardt	Edward Purnell	**George Clark**	William Holman	Robert Cropley (Ind FT); **Edward Darnley** (Ind FT); John Hawthorne* (Ind FT); Aaron Wheeler (Ind Prot)
Lismore	**Thomas Ewing**			James Walker (Ind Lab)
Macquarie	William Hurley	**James Tonkin**	John Skelton	Henry Brown (Ind FT); John Hughes (Ind Prot)
Manning	**Hugh McKinnon**	**James Young**		
Marrickville	Daniel Gallagher	Francis McLean	Elliot Johnson	Augustus Gross (Ind FT); George Leslie (Ind FT); Andrew Macauley (Ind Prot); Alexander Scouller (Ind FT)
Molong	**Andrew Ross**	Harrington McCulloch		John Ardill (Ind Prot); Charles Lauer (Ind Lab); William Melville (Ind Prot); Arthur Sherwin (Ind Prot)
Monaro	**Henry Dawson**; **Gus Miller***	Granville Ryrie		John O'Brien (Ind); Charles Welch (Ind Prot)
Moree	**Thomas Hassall**	T G Vyner		J Halse (Ind FT); L D Mouatt (Ind Lab)
Moruya	**Henry Clarke**	William Millard		William Boot (Ind Prot); John Brogan (Ind Prot); Thomas Garrard (Ind FT); John Roseby (Ind Prot)
Mudgee	Richard Rouse	**Robert Jones**	J M Appleyard	W Logan (Ind Prot); J Scully (Ind)
Murray	**James Hayes**	William Drummond		
Murrumbidgee	Thomas Fitzpatrick			Thomas Humphreys (Ind Prot); **Arthur Rae** (Ind Lab)
Narrabri		**Charles Collins**	Hugh Ross	George Gregory (Ind); Sydney Powell (Ind FT)
Nepean	Thomas Smith	**Samuel Lees**	Lewis Litton	
Newcastle East	**David Scott**	William Dick		
Newcastle West	**William Grahame**	James Ellis	James Thomson	James Blanksby (Ind FT); George Webb (Ind FT)
Newtown-Camperdown	James Smith	**Joseph Abbott**	Benjamin Morgan	John Cotton (Ind FT)
Newtown-Erskine		**Edmund Molesworth**	Robert Hollis	John Davis (Ind Prot); **John Hindle** (Ind FT)
Newtown-St Peters	**John Bowes**		Thomas Beasley	**Francis Cotton** (Ind FT); William Rigg* (Ind Ft)
Northumberland	**Richard Stevenson**	Henry Wheeler	James Donnelly	
Orange	Valentine Heaton	**Harry Newman**		Otto Jaeger (Ind FT)
Paddington	John White	William Shipway	Stephen Byrne	William Cowper (Ind FT); James Dillon (Ind FT); Alfred Godfrey (Ind FT); Roger Kirby (Ind Prot); John Robinson (Ind Prot); Thomas West (Ind FT); Maitland Whysall (Ind FT)
Parramatta	William Ferris	**Hugh Taylor**		William Garrett (Ind FT); Dowell O'Reilly* (Ind FT); James Thomas (Ind FT)
Petersham	William Robson	Benjamin Short	William Webster	John Bell (Ind FT); **Cornelius Danahey** (Ind FT); John Gelding (Ind); Llewellyn Jones* (Ind FT); George Withers (Ind FT)
Queanbeyan	**Edward O'Sullivan**	Alfred Conroy		James McInerney (Ind Lab)
Quirindi	**Robert Levien**	A J C Agassiz	Ramsay McKillop	T S Grehan (Ind FT); W Hawker (Ind Prot)
Raleigh	**Patrick Hogan**	Joseph McKay		James Gregg (Ind Lab); John Lynn (Ind Prot); John McLaughlin (Ind Prot); William Pullen (Ind Prot); Eugene Rudder (Ind)
Randwick	**Edmund Barton**	David Storey	George Stevenson	Richard Colonna-Close (Ind FT); Michael Kinnane (Ind Prot)
Redfern	**Henry Hoyle**	Samuel Bradley	**James McGowen**	William Coombes (Ind FT); William Poole (Ind FT)
Richmond				Allan Cameron (Ind Prot); Samuel Northcote (Ind Prot); Robert Page (Ind Prot); Robert Pyers* (Ind Prot); James Stock (Ind Prot)
Robertson	**Robert Fitzgerald**	Edwin Tucker		Michael Hickey (Ind Prot)
Ryde		**Frank Farnell**		John Forsythe (Ind FT); John Lennon (Ind Lab); John Rees (Ind Lab); Edward Terry (Ind FT)
Rylstone	**William Wall**	J F Hill	Francis Gilbert	James Granter (Ind Prot); Thomas Hungerford (Ind); James Purser (Ind FT); James Taylor (Ind FT)
St George		**Joseph Carruthers**	Denis Acton	
St Leonards	Francis Punch	**Sir Henry Parkes**		**Edward Clark** (Ind FT); James Ford (Ind FT); William Stoddart (Ind FT)
Sherbrooke	Ambrose Hallen	**Jacob Garrard**	James Williamson	William Bladon (Ind FT); Samuel Bursill (Ind FT); Donald Campbell (Ind FT); John Fitzpatrick (Ind FT); Henry Pigott (Ind FT); James Tamsett (Ind Prot); Edward Wakely (Ind FT)
Shoalhaven	John McLean	**Philip Morton**		William Kennedy (Ind FT); George Sinclair (Ind Prot)
Singleton	John Connelly	**Albert Gould**	William Burnett	
Sturt			William Ferguson	John Souter (Ind Prot)
Sydney-Belmore	Robert Mackay	James Graham	Thomas Tytherleigh	William Court (Ind Prot); Edward Foxall (Ind FT); Francis Freehill (Ind Prot); Thomas Murray (Ind Prot); George Perry (Ind Prot); Joseph Purcell (Ind Prot)
Sydney-Bligh	James Murphy	**James Martin**	James Hendry	Unni Carpenter (Ind FT); Patrick Hourigan (Ind Prot); Edward McConville (Ind Prot)
Sydney-Cook	**William Traill**	Samuel Whiddon	James Watson	
Sydney-Denison	**Andrew Kelly**	Matthew Harris	Andrew Thompson	Walter Dorman (Ind Prot); Henry Willis (Ind FT)
Sydney-Fitzroy		Henry Chapman	Henry Cato	Harry Foran (Ind Prot); Charles Forssberg (Ind Prot); John McElhone (Ind FT); William Morrison (Ind FT); Robert Roberts (Ind Prot)
Sydney-Flinders	William Kippax	**Bernhard Wise**	John Dobbie	Leighton Kesteven (Ind Prot); Joseph Olliffe (Ind FT)
Sydney-Gipps		Daniel O'Connor		**George Black** (Ind Lab)
Sydney-King	John Gannon	**George Reid**	George Reeve	Ivan Henry (Ind FT); William Maguire (Ind FT)
Sydney-Lang	**Jack FitzGerald**	John Taylor	Billy Hughes	John Butler (Ind FT)
Sydney-Phillip	**William Manning**	Robert Fowler	James Wilson	Charles Renshaw (Ind FT)
Sydney-Pyrmont		John Carter	**Thomas Davis**	Cyrus Fuller (Ind Prot); George Landers (Ind FT)
Tamworth	**George Dibbs**	Albert Piddington		James Toohey (Ind Prot); Raymond Walsh (Ind Lab)
Tenterfield	Henry Campbell	**Charles Lee**	John Coxall	
Tumut	Travers Jones	**Edward Brown**		John Cheney (Ind Prot); John Downing (Ind Prot); Robert Joyce (Ind Lab)
Tweed	**Bruce Nicoll**	William Baker	John Willard	James Barrie (Ind FT); Patrick Gilroy (Ind); George Halliday (Ind Prot); David Jarman (Ind Prot); Joseph Kelly (Ind Prot); John Marks (Ind Prot); James Murphy (Ind Prot)
Uralla-Walcha	Patrick O'Connor	James Leece		John Campbell (Ind); John Gardiner (Ind); Charles Givney (Ind Prot); Hugh Healy (Ind Lab); Edmund Moberly (Ind FT); William Piddington* (Ind FT)
Wagga Wagga	**James Gormly**			James McDarra (Ind Lab)
Wallsend	**Thomas Walker**	Albert Card	David Watkins	Alfred Deering (Ind); Oswald Steel (Ind Prot)
Waratah	**Ninian Melville**	Alfred Clapin	Arthur Griffith	
Warringah		Dugald Thomson	Jonathan Lepherd	Leonard Dodds (Ind FT); Henry Moss (Ind FT)
Waterloo	**William Sharp**	George Taylor	Ernest Banner	George Anderson* (Ind FT); John Navin (Ind Prot)
Waverley	Thomas Barlow	Angus Cameron	Thomas Kemp	**Alfred Allen** (Ind FT); James Carroll (Ind Prot)
Wellington	**Thomas York**	**John Haynes**	Michael O'Halloran	H Boehme (Ind Prot)
Wentworth	**Sir Joseph Abbott**		Robert Scobie	
West Macquarie	**Paddy Crick**	R W Peacock	John Bridgeman	**Charles Jeanneret** (Ind FT); J O'Donoghue (Ind)
West Maitland		**Robert Scobie**		**John Gillies*** (Ind FT); Arthur Payne (Ind Prot); Richard Proctor (Ind Lab)
Wickham	John Gilbert	**John Fegan**	James Dick	Joseph Barclay (Ind Prot); Peter Bennett (Ind FT); William Hestelow (Ind FT)
Wilcannia	**Edward Dickens**		Richard Sleath	
Willoughby	Francis Coffee	**Joseph Cullen**	Thomas Harper	John Burns (Ind FT); George Davies (Ind Prot); George Howarth (Ind FT); Robert Moodie (Ind Prot)
Woollahra		**John Neild**	Philip Moses	Adrian Knox (Ind FT)
Woronora		Thomas Bissell		Robert Lindsley (Ind FT); Joseph Mitchell (Ind FT); **John Nicholson*** (Ind Lab); Thomas Riley (Ind Prot)
Yass	**Thomas Colls**	William Affleck		Argyle McCallum (Ind Prot)
Young	**John Gough**; **James Mackinnon**		Chris Watson	William Lewis (Ind FT)

== See also ==
- Members of the New South Wales Legislative Assembly, 1894–1895
