= Members of the New South Wales Legislative Assembly, 1889–1891 =

Members of the New South Wales Legislative Assembly who served in the 14th parliament of New South Wales held their seats from 1889 to 1891. They were elected at the 1889 colonial election between 1 and 16 February 1889. The Speaker was James Young until 21 October 1890 and then Joseph Palmer Abbott.

Name	Party	Electorate	Term in office
Joseph Abbott	Free Trade	Newtown	1888–1895
Joseph Palmer Abbott	Protectionist	Wentworth	1880–1901
William Abbott	Protectionist	Upper Hunter	1889–1891
William A'Beckett	Free Trade	Bogan	1889–1891 1892–1894
Francis Abigail	Free Trade	West Sydney	1880–1891
William Alison	Protectionist	Bogan	1889–1891
Alfred Allen	Free Trade	Paddington	1887–1894
Edward Ball	Free Trade	Argyle	1887–1891
Robert Barbour	Protectionist	Murray	1877–1880 1882–1894
John Barnes	Protectionist	Gundagai	1889–1904
Reginald Black	Free Trade	Mudgee	1887–1891
Alexander Bowman	Free Trade	Hawkesbury	1877–1882 1885–1892
Walter Bradley ^{[15]}	Protectionist	East Sydney	1891
Alexander Brown	Protectionist	Newcastle	1889–1891
Herbert Brown	Free Trade	Durham	1875–1898
Wyman Brown	Protectionist	Sturt	1889–1891
James Brunker	Free Trade	East Maitland	1880–1904
Sydney Burdekin	Free Trade	East Sydney	1880–1882 1884–1891 1892–1894
John Burns	Free Trade	St Leonards	1861–1869, 1872–1891
Joseph Carruthers	Free Trade	Canterbury	1887–1908
George Cass	Protectionist	Bogan	1880–1892
John Chanter	Protectionist	Murray	1885–1901
Michael Chapman	Free Trade	Glebe	1883–1891
Henry Clarke	Protectionist	Eden	1869–1894, 1895–1904
George Clubb	Free Trade	Balmain	1889–1891
Charles Collins ^{[10]}	Free Trade	Namoi	1885– 1887 1890–1898
Thomas Colls	Protectionist	Yass Plains	1886–1894
Henry Cooke	Free Trade	Forbes	1880–1882 1887–1891
Henry Copeland	Protectionist	New England	1877–1883, 1883–1895, 1895–1900
David Copland	Protectionist	Murrumbidgee	1889–1891
Joseph Creer	Protectionist	Northumberland	1885–1891
Paddy Crick ^{[13]}	Protectionist	West Macquarie	1889–1906
George Cruickshank	Protectionist	Inverell	1889–1901
Joseph Cullen	Free Trade	St Leonards	1889–1894
James Curley ^{[5]}	Free Trade	Newcastle	1889–1891
David Dale ^{[3]}	Free Trade	Central Cumberland	1889–1894
Thomas Dalton	Protectionist	Orange	1882–1891
Otho Dangar	Protectionist	Macleay	1889–1893
Tom Dangar ^{[10]}	Free Trade	Namoi	1865–1885, 1887–1890
William Davis	Protectionist	Bourke	1889–1891, 1898–1904
Henry Dawson	Protectionist	Monaro	1885–1894
George Dibbs	Protectionist	Murrumbidgee	1874–1877, 1882–1895
Edward Dickens	Protectionist	Wilcannia	1889–1894
William Dowel	Protectionist	Tamworth	1887–1894
Thomas Ewing	Protectionist	South Sydney	1889–1891
Frank Farnell	Protectionist	Richmond	1885–1901
Frank Farnell ^{[4]}	Free Trade	Central Cumberland	1887–1898, 1901–1903
David Ferguson ^{[16]}	Protectionist	Wellington	1882–1891
Robert Fitzgerald	Protectionist	Upper Hunter	1885–1901
James Fletcher ^{[14]}	Protectionist	Newcastle	1880–1891
George Fuller	Free Trade	Kiama	1889–1894 1915–1928
Charles Garland	Free Trade	Carcoar	1885–1891
Jacob Garrard	Free Trade	Balmain	1880–1898
Thomas Garrett	Free Trade	Camden	1860–1871, 1872–1891
James Garvan	Protectionist	Eden	1880–1894
Charles Goodchap	Protectionist	Redfern	1889–1891
James Gormly	Protectionist	Murrumbidgee	1885–1904
John Gough	Protectionist	Young	1889–1894
Albert Gould	Free Trade	Patrick's Plains	1882–1898
William Grahame ^{[5, 14]}	Protectionist	Newcastle	1889–1894
George Greene	Free Trade	Grenfell	1889–1891 1894 1895–1898
Thomas Hassall	Protectionist	Gwydir	1886–1901
Nicholas Hawken	Free Trade	Newtown	1887–1891
John Hawthorne ^{[8]}	Free Trade	Balmain	1885–1891 1894–1904
James Hayes	Protectionist	Hume	1885–1904
John Haynes	Free Trade	Mudgee	1887–1904 1915–1917
Patrick Hogan	Protectionist	Macleay	1885–1887 1889–1895
William Holborow	Free Trade	Argyle	1880–1894
Peter Howe	Protectionist	Redfern	1888–1891
John Hurley ^{[9]}	Free Trade	Hartley	1872–1874 1876–1880, 1887–1891 1901–1907
Alexander Hutchison (d 1908)	Protectionist	Glen Innes	1889–1894
Alexander Hutchison (d 1917)	Free Trade	Canterbury	1887–1891
James Inglis	Free Trade	New England	1885–1894
Travers Jones	Protectionist	Tumut	1885–1891 1894–1898
John Kidd	Protectionist	Camden	1880–1882 1885–1887 1889–1904
Robert King	Free Trade	Paddington	1889–1891
Allen Lakeman	Protectionist	Balranald	1887–1891
Alfred Lamb ^{[12]}	Free Trade	West Sydney	1889–1890
Charles Lee	Free Trade	Tenterfield	1884–1920
Samuel Lees	Free Trade	Nepean	1887–1895 1898–1901
Robert Levien ^{[1]}	Protectionist	Tamworth	1880–1889, 1889–1913
John Linsley ^{[3]}	Free Trade	Central Cumberland	1889
William Lyne	Protectionist	Hume	1880–1901
James Mackinnon	Protectionist	Young	1882–1894
James Martin	Free Trade	South Sydney	1889–1895
William McCourt	Free Trade	Camden	1882–1885 1887–1913
John McFarlane	Protectionist	Clarence	1887–1915
William McMillan	Free Trade	East Sydney	1887–1898
Myles McRae	Protectionist	Morpeth	1889–1891
Ninian Melville	Protectionist	Northumberland	1880–1887 1889–1894
Gus Miller ^{[6]}	Protectionist	Monaro	1889–1918
Joseph Mitchell	Free Trade	Illawarra	1881–1882 1883–1885 1888–1889 1889–1891
Edmund Molesworth	Free Trade	Newtown	1889–1901
Philip Morton	Free Trade	Shoalhaven	1889–1898
Bruce Nicoll	Protectionist	Richmond	1889–1894
John Nobbs	Free Trade	Central Cumberland	1888–1993 1898–1913
Daniel O'Connor	Free Trade	West Sydney	1877–1891 1900–1904
Edward O'Sullivan	Protectionist	Queanbeyan	1885–1910
Sir Henry Parkes	Free Trade	St Leonards	1856, 1858, 1859–1861, 1864–1870, 1872–1895
John Perry	Protectionist	Richmond	1889–1920
William Paul	Free Trade	Bathurst	1889–1891
Thomas Playfair	Free Trade	West Sydney	1889–1891
John Plumb	Free Trade	Carcoar	1889–1891
George Reid	Free Trade	East Sydney	1880–1884 1885–1901
Robert Ritchie	Free Trade	Central Cumberland	1889–1891
Charles Roberts ^{7]}	Free Trade	Hastings and Manning	1882–1890
Andrew Ross	Protectionist	Molong	1880–1904
Alexander Ryrie	Protectionist	Braidwood	1880–1891
William Schey ^{[2]}	Protectionist	Redfern	1887–1898
Robert Scobie	Free Trade	Hunter	1889–1894
Jonathan Seaver	Free Trade	Gloucester	1887–1891
John See	Protectionist	Grafton	1880–1904
John Shepherd	Free Trade	Paddington	1877–1880 1885–1887 1889–1891
Thomas Slattery	Protectionist	Boorowa	1880–1885 1887–1895
Bruce Smith	Free Trade	Glebe	1882–1884, 1889–1894
Frank Smith	Free Trade	Balmain	1887–1891
Sydney Smith	Free Trade	East Macquarie	1882–1898 1900
Harold Stephen ^{[6]}	Protectionist	Monaro	1885–1889
William Stephen	Free Trade	Redfern	1887–1891 1894–1895
Richard Stevenson	Protectionist	Wollombi	1886–1895 1898–1899
Alfred Stokes	Protectionist	Forbes	1882–1891
John Street ^{15]}	Free Trade	East Sydney	1887–1891
John Sutherland ^{[2]}	Free Trade	Redfern	1860–1881, 1882–1889
Adolphus Taylor ^{[12]}	Independent	West Sydney	1882–1887 1890–1891
Hugh Taylor	Free Trade	Parramatta	1882–1894
Cecil Teece ^{[11]}	Independent	Goulburn	1890–1891
William Teece ^{[11]}	Free Trade	Goulburn	1872–1890
Richard Thompson	Free Trade	West Maitland	1885–1891
James Tonkin	Free Trade	East Macquarie	1887–1895
James Toohey	Protectionist	South Sydney	1885–1891
James Torpy	Protectionist	Orange	1889–1894
William Traill	Protectionist	South Sydney	1889–1894
Edwin Turner	Free Trade	Gunnedah	1889–1894
Walter Vivian ^{[7]}	Free Trade	Hastings and Manning	1880–1894
Thomas Waddell	Protectionist	Bourke	1887–1917
Thomas Walker	Protectionist	Northumberland	1887–1894
William Wall	Protectionist	Mudgee	1886–1895
Jack Want	Free Trade	Paddington	1885–1894
John Wheeler	Free Trade	Canterbury	1889–1891
John Wilkinson	Protectionist	Albury	1889–1895
Robert Wilkinson	Free Trade	Balranald	1880–1894
William Willis	Protectionist	Bourke	1889–1904
James Wilshire	Free Trade	Canterbury	1889–1891
Francis Woodward	Free Trade	Illawarra	1887–1891
Francis Wright	Protectionist	Glen Innes	1882–1885, 1889–1903
Thomas York ^{[16]}	Protectionist	Wellington	1889–1891
James Young	Free Trade	Hastings and Manning	1880–1901 1904–1907

By-elections

Under the constitution, ministers were required to resign to recontest their seats in a by-election when appointed. These by-elections are only noted when the minister was defeated; in general, he was elected unopposed.

#	Electorate	Departing Member	Party	Reason for By-election	Date of By-election	Winner of By-election	Party
1	Tamworth	Robert Levien	Protectionist	Sought a new mandate after being involved in a legal scandal	18 June 1889	Robert Levien	Protectionist
2	Redfern	John Sutherland	Protectionist	Death	8 July 1889	William Schey	Protectionist
3	Central Cumberland	John Linsley	Free Trade	Death	22 July 1889	David Dale	Free Trade
4	Central Cumberland	Frank Farnell	Free Trade	Financial difficulty	5 October 1889	Frank Farnell	Free Trade
5	Newcastle	William Grahame	Protectionist	Financial Difficulty	12 October 1889	James Curley	Free Trade
6	Monaro	Harold Stephen	Protectionist	Death	17 December 1889	Gus Miller	Protectionist
7	Hastings and Manning	Charles Roberts	Free Trade	Resigned to travel to England	5 April 1890	Walter Vivian	Free Trade
8	Balmain	John Hawthorne	Free Trade	Financial Difficulty	12 July 1890	John Hawthorne	Free Trade
9	Hartley	John Hurley	Free Trade	Financial Difficulty	22 July 1890	John Hurley	Free Trade
10	Namoi	Tom Dangar	Free Trade	Death	31 July 1890	Charles Collins	Protectionist
11	Goulburn	William Teece Jr	Free Trade	Death	16 August 1890	Cecil Teece	Independent
12	West Sydney	Alfred Lamb	Free Trade	Death	25 October 1890	Adolphus Taylor	Independent
13	West Macquarie	Paddy Crick	Protectionist	Expelled after outrageous behaviour in the chamber	6 December 1890	Paddy Crick	Protectionist
14	Newcastle	James Fletcher	Protectionist	Death	14 April 1891	William Grahame	Protectionist
15	East Sydney	John Street	Free Trade	Death	14 April 1891	Walter Bradley	Protectionist
16	Wellington	David Ferguson	Protectionist	Death	29 May 1891	Thomas York	Protectionist

== See also ==
- Fifth Parkes ministry
- Results of the 1889 New South Wales colonial election
- Candidates of the 1889 New South Wales colonial election
