= Electoral results for the district of Molong =

Election results for Molong, New South Wales, Australia

Molong, an electoral district of the Legislative Assembly in the Australian state of New South Wales was created in 1880 and abolished in 1904

Election	Member	Party
1880	Andrew Ross	None
1882	Andrew Ross	None
1885	Andrew Ross	None
1887	Andrew Ross	Ind. Protectionist
1889	Andrew Ross	Protectionist
1891	Andrew Ross	Protectionist
1894	Andrew Ross	Protectionist
1895	Andrew Ross	Protectionist
1898	Andrew Ross	National Federal
1901	Andrew Ross	Progressive / Independent Liberal

== Election results ==
=== Elections in the 1900s ===
==== 1901 ====
1901 New South Wales state election: Molong
Party	Candidate	Votes	%	±%
Progressive	Andrew Ross	671	55.2	+10.6
Liberal Reform	John Withington	544	44.8	+13.6
Total formal votes		1,215	99.1	−0.1
Informal votes		11	0.9	+0.1
Turnout		1,226	56.6	−4.9
Progressive hold				

=== Elections in the 1890s ===
==== 1898 ====
1898 New South Wales colonial election: Molong
Party	Candidate	Votes	%	±%
National Federal	Andrew Ross	558	44.7	
Free Trade	Harrington McCulloch	389	31.1	
Independent Federalist	William Shield	302	24.2	
Total formal votes		1,249	99.2	
Informal votes		10	0.8	
Turnout		1,259	61.6	
National Federal hold				

==== 1895 ====
1895 New South Wales colonial election: Molong
Party	Candidate	Votes	%	±%
Protectionist	Andrew Ross	548	45.3	
Free Trade	Harrington McCulloch	412	34.1	
Ind. Protectionist	John Wynne	108	8.9	
Ind. Protectionist	William Melville	85	7.0	
Ind. Protectionist	Charles Lauer	56	4.6	
Total formal votes		1,209	99.1	
Informal votes		11	0.9	
Turnout		1,220	64.2	
Protectionist hold				

==== 1894 ====
1894 New South Wales colonial election: Molong
Party	Candidate	Votes	%	±%
Protectionist	Andrew Ross	504	37.4	
Free Trade	Harrington McCulloch	311	23.1	
Ind. Protectionist	William Melville	253	18.8	
Independent Labour	Charles Lauer	247	18.4	
Ind. Protectionist	Arthur Sherwin	20	1.5	
Ind. Protectionist	John Ardill	11	0.8	
Total formal votes		1,346	94.3	
Informal votes		82	5.7	
Turnout		1,428	77.2	
Protectionist hold				

==== 1891 ====
1891 New South Wales colonial election: Molong Monday 29 June
Party	Candidate	Votes	%	±%
Protectionist	Andrew Ross (re-elected)	844	62.4	
Labour	Cornelius Lindsay	319	23.6	
Free Trade	John Hurley	189	14.0	
Total formal votes		1,352	97.5	
Informal votes		35	2.5	
Turnout		1,387	65.2	
Protectionist hold				

=== Elections in the 1880s ===
==== 1889 ====
1889 New South Wales colonial election: Molong Monday 28 January
Party	Candidate	Votes	%	±%
Protectionist	Andrew Ross (elected)	unopposed		
Total formal votes		25,142	99.8	
Informal votes		47	0.2	
Turnout		6,977	61.2	
Member changed to Protectionist from Ind. Protectionist				

==== 1887 ====
1887 New South Wales colonial election: Molong Tuesday 8 February
Party	Candidate	Votes	%	±%
Ind. Protectionist	Andrew Ross (re-elected)	unopposed		

==== 1885 ====
1885 New South Wales colonial election: Molong Thursday 29 October
Candidate	Votes	%
Andrew Ross (re-elected)	695	54.8
Fergus Smith	573	45.2
Total formal votes	1,268	98.3
Informal votes	22	1.7
Turnout	1,290	69.1

==== 1882 ====
1882 New South Wales colonial election: Molong Tuesday 12 December
Candidate	Votes	%
Andrew Ross (re-elected)	656	75.8
Willoughby Andrew	210	24.3
Total formal votes	866	98.1
Informal votes	17	1.9
Turnout	883	47.5

==== 1880 ====
1880 New South Wales colonial election: Molong Friday 26 November
Candidate	Votes	%
Andrew Ross (elected)	520	50.3
John Smith	514	49.7
Total formal votes	1,034	97.7
Informal votes	24	2.3
Turnout	1,058	57.0
	(new seat)	
