= 1894 New South Wales colonial election =

Colonial election for New South Wales, Australia in July 1894

- 17 July 1894

All 125 seats in the New South Wales Legislative Assembly 63 Assembly seats were needed for a majority
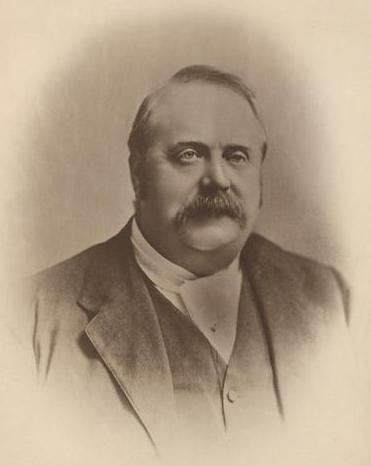

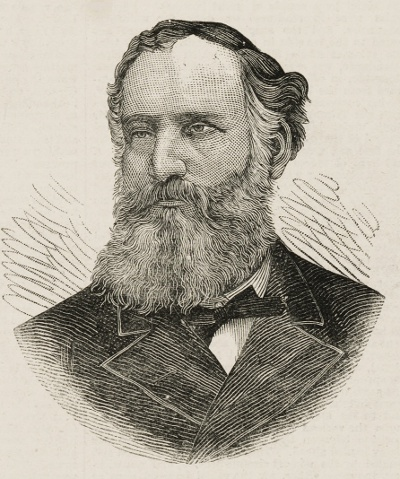
	First party	Second party	Third party
			LEL
Leader	George Reid	George Dibbs	No leader
Party	Free Trade	Protectionist	Labour
Leader since	September 1891	January 1889	N/A
Leader's seat	East Sydney (won Sydney-King)	Murrumbidgee (won Tamworth)	N/A
Last election	44 seats	52 seats	35 seats
Seats won	50	37	15
Seat change	▲6	▼15	▼20
Percentage	30.34%	27.69%	16.49%
Swing	▼6.15	▼8.81	▼4.13
- Results of the election, showing the winning vote share of the elected member.
Premier before election
George Dibbs
Protectionist
Premier after election
George Reid
Free Trade

The 1894 New South Wales colonial election was held on 17 July 1894 for all of the 125 seats in the 16th New South Wales Legislative Assembly and it was conducted in single-member constituencies with a first past the post voting system. Section 23 (1) of the Parliamentary Electorates and Elections Act of 1893 conferred a right to vote on 'every male person, being a natural born [British] subject, who shall have resided or had his principal place of abode in New South Wales for a continuous period of one year'. The 15th parliament of New South Wales was dissolved on 25 June 1894 by the Governor, Sir Robert Duff, on the advice of the Premier, George Dibbs.

This election saw the elimination of multi-member districts. At the previous election there had been 20 two-member districts, 10 three-member districts, and 9 four-member districts. Their elimination also saw the Assembly reduced in size from 141 to 125 members. Also, for the first time, the election was conducted on the one day.

Although he had lost control of the Assembly, Dibbs did not resign until after parliament had reconvened, when the Governor forced his hand.

== Key dates ==
Date	Event
25 June 1894	The Legislative Assembly dissolved, and writs issued by the Governor to proceed with an election
9 – 14 July 1894	Close of nominations for candidates
17 July 1894	Polling day
7 August 1894	Opening of 16th Parliament

== Results ==
New South Wales colonial election, 17 July 1894 Legislative Assembly << 1891–1895 >>
Enrolled voters	255,802				
Votes cast	200,956		Turnout	78.56	+19.48
Informal votes	3,310		Informal	1.62	−0.38
Summary of votes by party
Party	Primary votes	%	Swing	Seats	Change
Free Trade	60,966	30.34	−6.15	50	+6
Protectionist	55,652	27.69	−8.81	37	−15
Labor	33,143	16.49	−4.13	15	−20
Ind. Free Trade	23,324	11.61	+7.91	11	+7
Ind. Protectionist	14,434	7.18	+5.17	4	±0
Independent Labor	11,504	5.72	+5.30	8	+7
Independent	1,933	0.96	−0.71	0	−1
Total	200,956			125	

Popular vote
Free Trade	30.34%
Protectionist	27.69%
Labor	16.49%
Ind. Free Trade	11.61%
Ind. Protectionist	7.18%
Ind. Labor	5.72%
Independent	0.96%
Parliamentary seats
Free Trade	50
Protectionist	37
Labor	15
Ind. Free Trade	11
Ind. Labor	8
Ind. Protectionist	4

== Retiring members ==
=== Protectionist ===
- Robert Barbour MLA (Murray)
- James Torpy MLA (Orange)

=== Free Trade ===
- William A'Beckett MLA (Bogan)
- Robert Booth MLA (Bogan)
- David Dale MLA (Central Cumberland)
- James Eve MLA (Canterbury)
- William Holborow MLA (Argyle)
- James Inglis MLA (New England)
- James Marks MLA (Paddington)
- Bruce Smith MLA (Glebe)
- Robert Wilkinson MLA (Balranald)

=== Independent ===
- Jack Want MLA (Paddington) – Independent Free Trade
- Thomas Williams MLA (Upper Hunter) – Independent Labor

== Aftermath ==
As a result of the election the representation of Labor Electoral League members in the Legislative Assembly fell from thirty-five to fifteen (representing ten country seats and five metropolitan seats). However, during the previous parliament after the 1891 election, the Labor members had not functioned as a cohesive unit whereas the fifteen elected in 1895 were more of a united force, bonded by their pledge to maintain caucus solidarity, under the leadership of James McGowen. In addition a total of thirteen non-solidarity Labor men (those who refused to sign the caucus solidarity pledge) were elected to seats in 1894, all sitting members except two. With a combined total of twenty-eight seats the number of Labor-inclined members in the 125 seat parliament represented a potentially effective voting faction, especially with over half of those members within a bloc committed to caucus solidarity.

Free trade supporters won fifty-eight seats in the new parliament, most of them members of the Free Trade Party under George Reid and including thirty-three of the forty metropolitan seats. The protectionists were reduced to thirty-nine seats, all in country areas. After the election George Dibbs, the Protectionist Party leader, did not resign, wanting to test his support in parliament. However the Governor Robert Duff forced his hand and Dibbs resigned on 2 August 1894. The next day Reid formed his first ministry, which included Joseph Cook, leader of the non-solidarity Labor members, as Postmaster-General, a tactical decision that assured the support of at least seven free traders amongst the thirteen non-solidarity Labor members.

Despite having a majority in a reforming Legislative Assembly Reid had only a handful of supporters in the Legislative Council, made up of men nominated by previous parliaments, appointed for life by the governor, and constituting a body increasingly seen as representing a "bulwark for the privileged classes". The legislative reform agenda of the Assembly was frequently frustrated by Council amendments, as well as outright inaction and obstruction. The situation reached a critical point with the fate of the land and income tax assessment bill, for which Reid considered he had a clear mandate from the electors. The legislation was introduced in November 1894 and after a full debate was sent to the Council in March 1895. On 25 June 1895 Reid reported to the Assembly that the bill "was destroyed" in the Legislative Council. He appealed to all members of the lower house for support and announced that the lieutenant-governor had agreed to dissolve the house in order for a general election to be held.

== See also ==
- Candidates of the 1894 New South Wales colonial election
- Members of the New South Wales Legislative Assembly, 1894–1895
