= 1892 The Bogan colonial by-election =

By-election in New South Wales, Australia

A by-election was held for the New South Wales Legislative Assembly electorate of The Bogan on 31 May 1892 because of the death of George Cass (Protectionist).

== Dates ==
| Date | Event |
|---|---|
| 6 April 1892 | George Cass died. |
| 22 April 1892 | Writ of election issued by the Speaker of the Legislative Assembly. |
| 16 May 1892 | Nominations |
| 31 May 1892 | Polling day between 8:00 am and 4:00 pm. |
| 14 June 1892 | Return of writ |

== Results ==
1892 The Bogan by-election Tuesday 31 May
| Party | Candidate | Votes | % | ±% |
|---|---|---|---|---|
| Free Trade | William A'Beckett (elected) | 984 | 37.0 | |
| Protectionist | Michael O'Halloran (Note: Michael O'Halloran was also endorsed as a Labour candidate.) | 874 | 32.9 | |
| Independent | George Plummer | 271 | 10.2 | |
| Independent | William Wilkinson | 271 | 10.2 | |
| Free Trade | John Ryrie | 257 | 9.7 | |
| Total formal votes | | 2,657 | 100.0 | |
| Informal votes | | 0 | 0.0 | |
| Turnout | | 2,657 | 43.5 | |
| Free Trade gain from Protectionist | | | | |

== See also ==
- Electoral results for the district of The Bogan
- List of New South Wales state by-elections
