= Arthur A'Beckett =

Australian politician and novelist

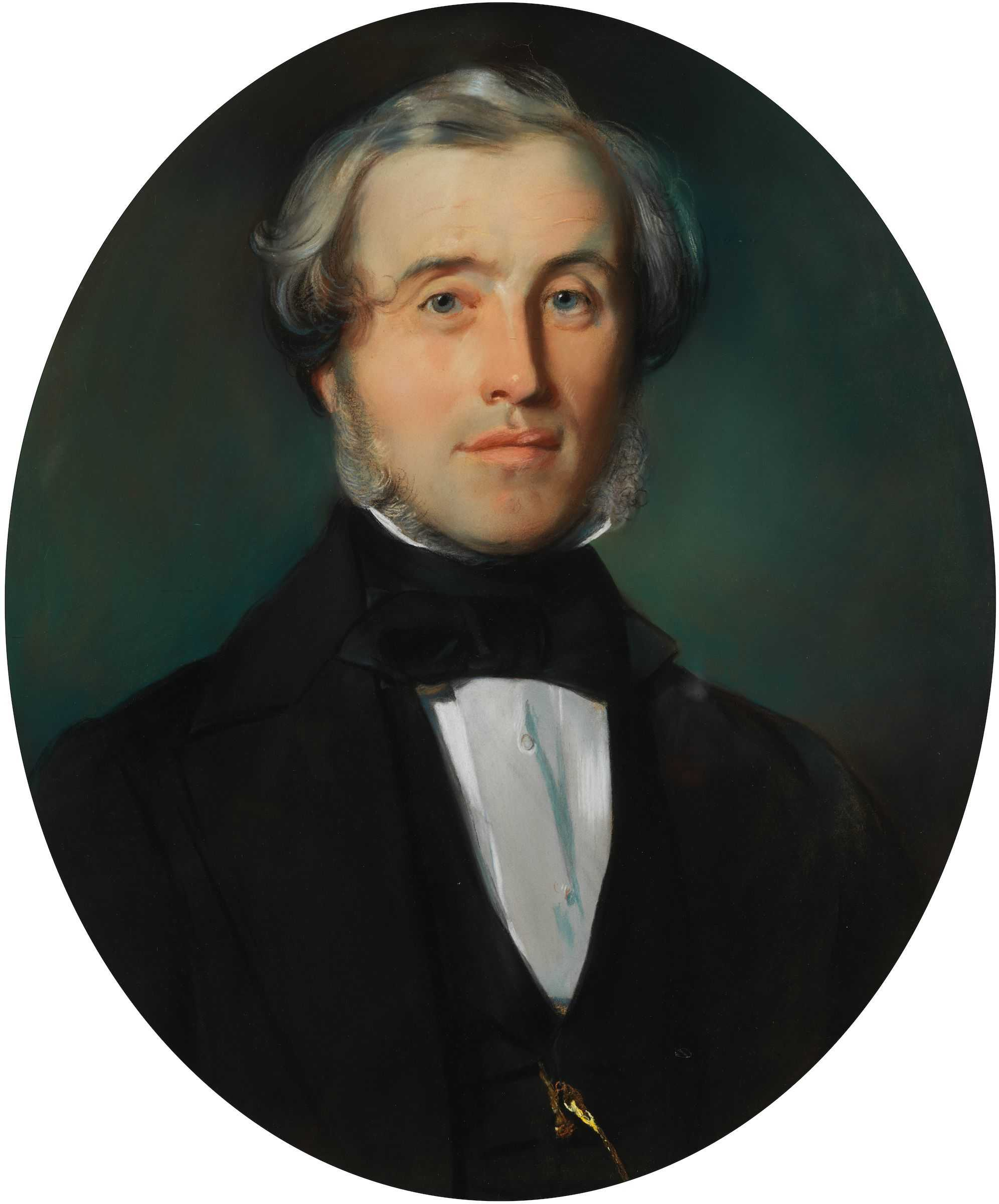
- A'Beckett circa 1840
- In office 1856–1860

Personal details
- Born: 1812 Sydney
- Died: 23 May 1871 (aged 58–59) Sydney
- Spouse: Emma Louise Elwin (m. 1838)
- Children: 5 sons and 5 daughters, including William Channing A'Beckett
- Education: University of London
- Occupation: Surgeon, politician

Arthur Martin A'Beckett (1812 – 23 May 1871) was an English-born Australian surgeon and politician who served in the New South Wales Legislative Council from 1856 to 1860. Arthur A'Beckett died in Sydney in 1871.

== Life ==
Arthur Martin A'Beckett was born in 1812 in London, United Kingdom to William A'Beckett, a solicitor, and Sarah Abbott. A'Beckett studied medicine in Paris and in London at London University. From 1835 to 1837, he served as a staff surgeon to the British Legion in Spain, where he received several Spanish decorations including the Knight Bachelor of San Ferdinand. In 1838, A'Beckett married Emma Louise Elwin, with whom he had 5 sons and 5 children, with one of his sons William Channing A'Beckett being born in 1846. They migrated in that year to New South Wales after encouragement from his brother, Sir William A'Beckett.

== Career ==
In New South Wales, he continued to serve as a surgeon, rising through the ranks of the Sydney medical fraternity. He also served as a consultant surgeon to Benevolent asylums, and as an examiner for the University of Sydney's medical faculty. In 1855, he was appointed as a Fellow of the Royal College of Surgeons.

From 13 May 1856 to 9 November 1860, A'Beckett served on the New South Wales Legislative Council. His brother Sir William A'Beckett was Chief Justice of Victoria, while his son William Channing A'Beckett later joined the New South Wales Legislative Assembly. In NSW, he continued to promote education and the arts, with A'Beckett serving as a commissioner due to his contributions to the Exposition Universelle of 1855. He also served as the President of the Sydney Mechanics' School of Arts and as a trustee of the Australian Museum and Sydney Grammar School.

== Namesake ==
Arthur A'Beckett, lawyer, journalist and son of the writer Gilbert Abbott À Beckett, joined the staff of the magazine Punch in London in 1875. His first novel Fallen Among Thieves, "an early country house murder & detective story", had appeared in 1870.
