= James McInerney (Australian politician) =

Australian politician (1844–1912)

James McInerney (15 December 1844 – 8 July 1912) was an Australian politician.

== Biography ==
He was born at Portland Head, near Windsor, to James McInerney and Honora Ryan. He grew up in Campbelltown and in the 1860s went to Narrandera and then Gundagai, working as a carrier. He eventually acquired property around Gundagai and was also involved in mining. He married Julia McLean, with whom he had eight children. He was a member of the Farmers' and Settlers' Association of New South Wales from 1899, serving as vice-president from 1899 to 1902 and as president from 1902 to 1905. In 1906, he resigned from the Association to join the New South Wales Labor Party. From 1906 to 1911, he was President of Adjungbilly Shire. In 1912, McInerney was appointed to the New South Wales Legislative Council, but he died at Gundagai before taking his seat.
