= 1889 New South Wales colonial election =

Colonial election for New South Wales, Australia in February 1889

- 1 February 1889 – 16 February 1889

All 137 seats in the New South Wales Legislative Assembly 69 Assembly seats were needed for a majority
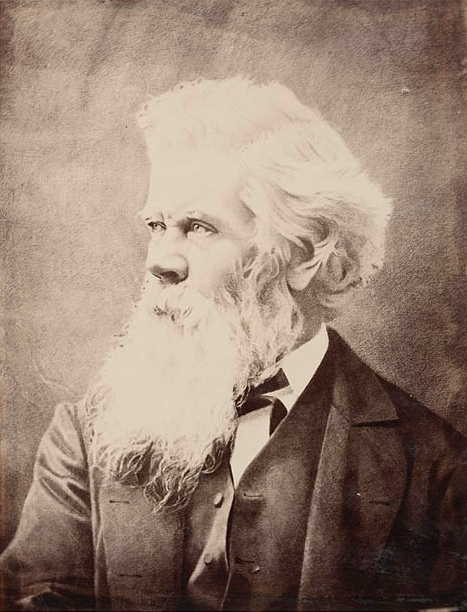

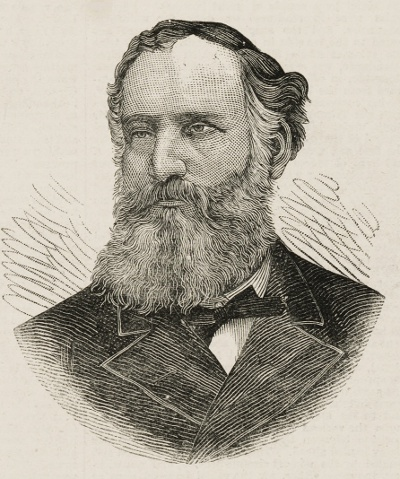
| | First party | Second party |
|---|---|---|
| Leader | Sir Henry Parkes | George Dibbs |
| Party | Free Trade | Protectionist |
| Leader since | 1886 | 17 January 1889 |
| Leader's seat | St Leonards | Murrumbidgee |
| Last election | 79 seats | 37 seats |
| Seats won | 71 seats | 66 seats |
| Seat change | ▼8 | ▲29 |
| Percentage | 48.63% | 51.37% |
| Swing | ▼12.12 | ▲18.48 |
- Results of the election, showing winners in each seat. Seats without circles indicate the electorate returned one member.
Premier before election
George Dibbs
Protectionist
Elected Premier
Sir Henry Parkes
Free Trade

The 1889 New South Wales colonial election was held between 1 February and 16 February 1889. This election was for all of the 137 seats in the New South Wales Legislative Assembly and it was conducted in 37 single-member constituencies, nineteen 2-member constituencies, ten 3-member constituencies and eight 4-member constituencies, all with a first past the post system. Part 1 (section 13) of the Electoral Act of 1880 had awarded the right to vote to 'every male subject of Her Majesty of the full age of twenty-one years and absolutely free being a natural born or naturalized'. The previous parliament of New South Wales was dissolved on 19 January 1889 by the Governor, Lord Carrington, on the advice of the Premier, George Dibbs.

Dibbs had assumed office shortly before the election after the previous Premier, Sir Henry Parkes, lost a vote on the floor of the Assembly. Dibbs' Protectionists never commanded a majority on the floor of the Assembly in this period.

== Key dates ==
| Date | Event |
|---|---|
| 19 January 1889 | The Legislative Assembly was dissolved, and writs were issued by the Governor to proceed with an election. |
| 25 January to 12 February 1889 | Nominations for candidates for the election closed. |
| 1 February to 16 February 1889 | Polling days. |
| 27 February 1889 | Opening of new Parliament. |
| 8 March 1889 | Fifth Parkes ministry sworn in. |

== Results ==
New South Wales colonial election, 1 – 16 February 1889 Legislative Assembly << 1887–1891 >>
| Enrolled voters | | | | | |
| Votes cast | 150,816 | | Turnout | 59.93 | +1.69 |
| Informal votes | 2,641 | | Informal | 1.72 | −0.02 |
Summary of votes by party
| Party | Primary votes | % | Swing | Seats | Change |
| Protectionist | 77,468 | 51.37 | +18.48 | 66 | +29 |
| Free Trade | 73,348 | 48.63 | −12.12 | 71 | −8 |
| Other | | | –6.36 | 0 | -8 |
| Total | 363,554 | | | 137 | |

Popular vote
| Protectionist | 51.37% |
| Free Trade | 48.63% |
Parliamentary seats
| Free Trade | 71 |
| Protectionist | 66 |

== Retiring members ==
=== Protectionist ===
- Frederick Crouch MLA (Richmond)
- John Gale MLA (Murray)
- Robert Smith MLA (Macleay)

=== Free Trade ===
- Angus Cameron MLA (Kiama)
- William Cortis MLA (Bathurst)
- William Davis MLA (Canterbury)
- William Henson MLA (Canterbury)
- Isaac Ives MLA (St Leonards)
- Alexander Kethel MLA (West Sydney)
- William Martin MLA (Shoalhaven)
- George Matheson MLA (Glen Innes)
- John McElhone MLA (Upper Hunter)
- George Merriman MLA (West Sydney)
- Samuel Moore MLA (Inverell)
- Joseph Penzer MLA (Bogan)
- Fergus Smith MLA (West Macquarie)
- William Wilkinson MLA (Glebe)
- Alexander Wilson MLA (Bourke)
- George Withers MLA (South Sydney)

== See also ==
- Members of the New South Wales Legislative Assembly, 1889–1891
- Candidates of the 1889 New South Wales colonial election
