= Patrick Jennings =

Australian politician (1831–1897)

The Honourable Sir Patrick Jennings KCMG
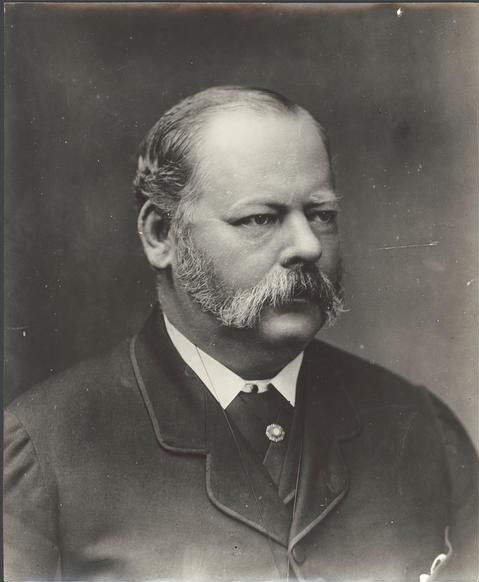
- Sir Patrick Alfred Jennings

11th Premier of New South Wales
- In office 26 February 1886 – 19 January 1887
- Preceded by: John Robertson
- Succeeded by: Henry Parkes

Colonial Secretary
- In office 10 October 1885 – 21 December 1885
- Premier: George Dibbs
- Preceded by: George Dibbs
- Succeeded by: John Robertson

Personal details
- Born: 20 March 1831 Newry, County Down, Ireland
- Died: 11 July 1899 (aged 68) Brisbane, Queensland, Australia

Sir Patrick Alfred Jennings, KCMG (20 March 1831 – 11 July 1897) was an Irish-Australian politician and Premier of New South Wales.

Australian Exhibition Schottische
MIDI render composed 1879 by William Henry Smith (1859-1929) dedicated to Patrick Jennings for the Sydney International Exhibition

== Early life ==
Jennings was born at Newry, Ireland, the son of Francis Jennings. He soon became a shopkeeper, and then moved into quartz-crushing and bought a large pastoral property on the Murrumbidgee River. In 1857 he became a magistrate. He ran unsuccessfully for the Crowlands in the Victorian Legislative Assembly in 1859 and then became chairman of the St Arnaud Council. In 1863, he married Mary Ann Shanahan and moved to Warbreccan near Deniliquin.

== Political career ==
Jennings was nominated to the Legislative Council in 1867. He resigned in 1870 to enter the Legislative Assembly, but resigned in 1872 and was out of parliament for some years. He unsuccessfully contested the 1874 election for Mudgee, the Upper Hunter by-election in June 1875 and the 1877 election for Wellington. He was a New South Wales Commissioner at the colonial exhibition in Melbourne in 1875, represented the colonies of New South Wales, Queensland and Tasmania at the Philadelphia exhibition in 1876, executive commissioner for the International Exhibition in Sydney in 1879.

Jennings was elected to the assembly again in 1880 as a member for the Bogan and from January to July 1883 was Vice-President of the Executive Council in the ministry of Sir Alexander Stuart. He was Colonial Secretary from October to December 1885 in the first ministry of George Dibbs, and in February 1886 became the first practising Catholic Premier and was also Colonial Treasurer. His attempts to balance the budget included a 5 per cent ad valorem tariff, which came to be seen as a violation of his free-trade platform. He did not contest the 1887 election.

Jennings died at Brisbane on 11 July 1897. His wife had died in 1887, but he was survived by two sons and a daughter.

== Honours ==
He actively sought honours and was fascinated with titles, publishing an essay on knighthood. In 1874, he was honoured by Pope Pius IX with the Order of St. Gregory the Great, and in 1876 was made a Knight Commander of the Order of Pope Pius IX and St. Gregory the Great; he also received the Knight Grand Cross of the Order of Pius IX from Pope Leo XIII. He was created Knight Commander of the Order of St Michael and St George (KCMG) in 1880, and was made an honorary Doctor of Laws (LL.D.) of Dublin University in 1887.

The town of Jennings, New South Wales, was named in his honour.

Political offices
| Preceded by John Robertson | Premier of New South Wales; 1886 – 1887 | Succeeded by Henry Parkes |
| Preceded by John Burns | Colonial Treasurer; 1886 – 1887 | Succeeded by John Burns |
| Preceded by George Dibbs | Colonial Secretary; October – December 1885 | Succeeded by John Robertson |
| Preceded by Frederick Darley | Vice-President of the Executive Council; Jan – July 1883 | Vacant Title next held by Charles Mackellar |
New South Wales Legislative Assembly
| Preceded by Robert Landale | Member for Murray; 1869 – 1872 | Succeeded by William Hay |
| Preceded by Walter Coonan | Member for Bogan; 1880 – 1887; With: George Cass | Succeeded by John Kelly; Joseph Penzer |
