= Wilfred Blacket =

Australian barrister (27 September 1859 - 6 February 1937)

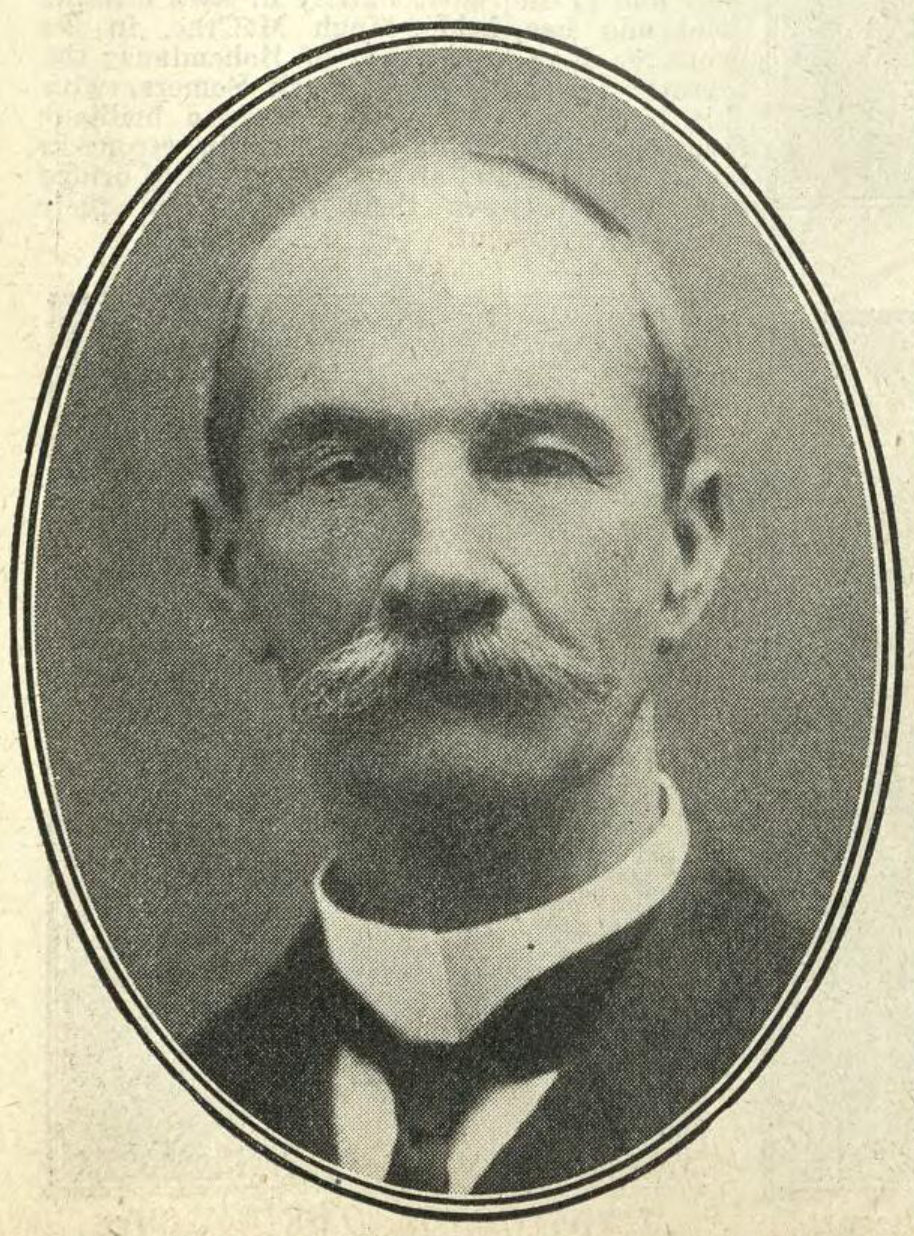
Wilfred Blacket KC

Wilfred Blacket KC (27 September 1859 – 6 February 1937) was an Australian barrister.

He was born in Sydney to clerk Russell Blacket and Alicia Jackson. He grew up at Keira Vale, where his father became the schoolmaster. He became a bank clerk at fifteen, and became a contributor to the Bulletin, becoming its first formal sub-editor by the 1880s. During this period he also studied law, and was called to the bar in 1887. He worked mostly in the district courts, often defending accused Aborigines. He married Gertrude Louisa Lovegrove on 24 April 1894, by which time he had a successful and substantial practice. During this period he twice ran for the New South Wales Legislative Assembly as a Protectionist.

Around 1900 Blacket became secretary to the Statute Law Consolidation Commission, but he was not appointed to the Supreme Court despite his obvious qualifications. He was royal commissioner into Federal capital administration in 1916–17. In 1912 he took silk, and practised mainly in the High Court, where he became known as a radical with unionist sympathies. In 1927 he published his memoirs, May It Please Your Honour. He died at Lindfield in 1937.
