= James Morgan (New South Wales politician) =

Australian politician

James Morgan (1853 – 9 August 1933) was an Australian politician.

He was born in Hobart, but his family moved to New South Wales the following year. He attended Paddington National School in Sydney and became a compositor for the Sydney Morning Herald. He was then a gold miner before settling at Wonboyn Lake near Eden. On 16 May 1874 he married Mary Gowland, with whom he had four sons. In 1891 he was elected to the New South Wales Legislative Assembly as the Labor member for Bogan. He refused to sign the pledge, and in 1894 was the successful Protectionist candidate for Dubbo. He was defeated in 1895. Morgan died at Sydney in 1933.

New South Wales Legislative Assembly
Preceded by William A'Beckett; William Alison	Member for Bogan; 1891–1894; Served alongside: Booth, Cass/A'Beckett	Abolished
New seat	Member for Dubbo; 1894–1895	Succeeded by Simeon Phillips
