= Joseph Penzer =

Australian politician

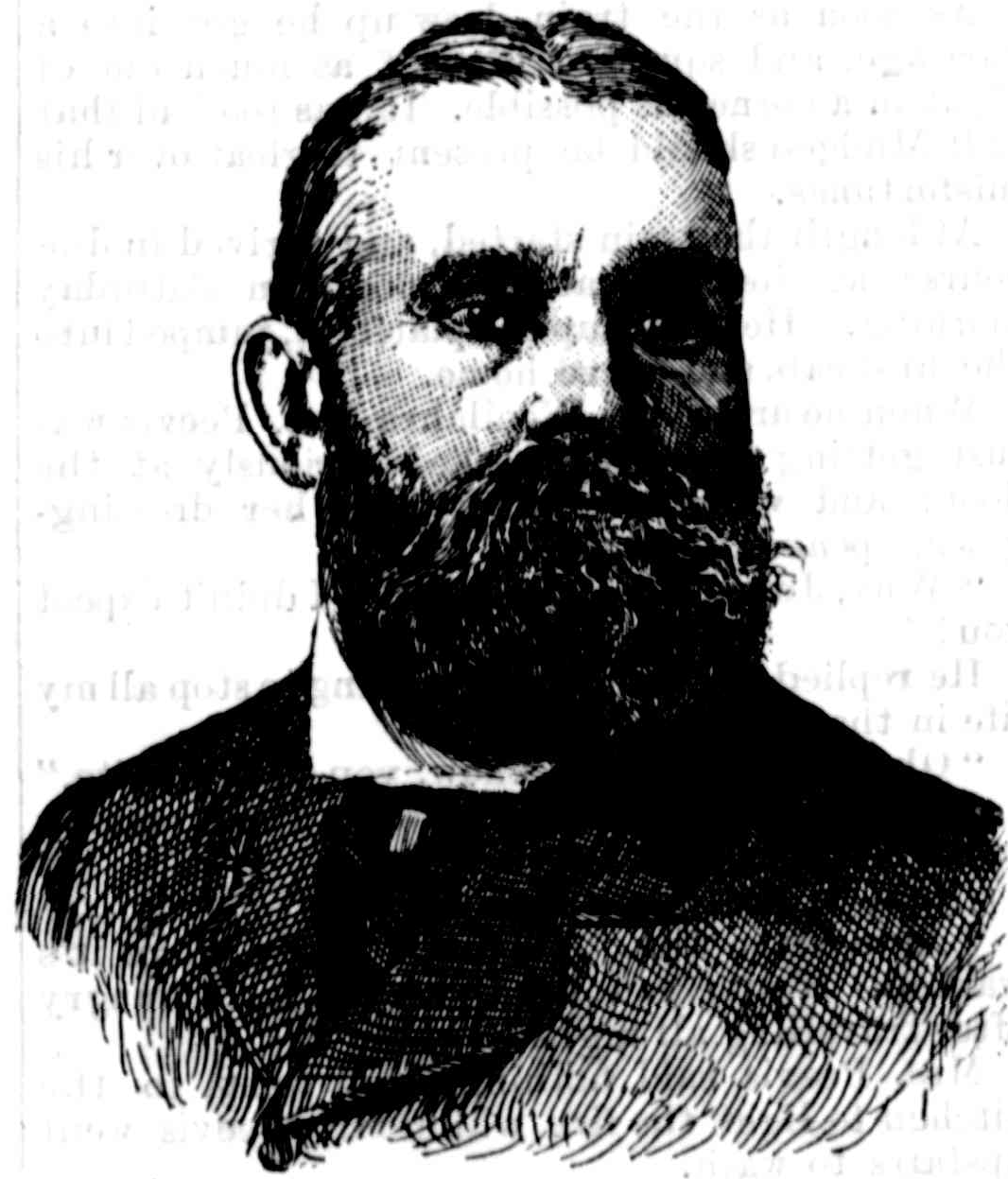

Joseph Penzer (1833 – 26 September 1905) was an English-born Australian politician.

He was born in Birmingham in 1833, a farmer's son. He arrived in New South Wales around 1854, and settled in Grafton, where he kept a store. He moved to the Dubbo region in 1862, where he was a pastoralist. He was appointed a magistrate in 1864.

On 14 April 1879 he married Jane Rebecca Booth, the sister of Robert Booth, with whom he had two sons, Walter and Robert.

In 1887 he was elected to the New South Wales Legislative Assembly as a Free Trade member for Bogan. He did not re-contest in 1889.

Penzer died at Yarrandale near Dubbo in 1905 (aged 72). (Note: His obituary in The Dubbo Liberal and Macquarie Advocate gives his year of birth as 1833, which is consistent with his age as 72, while his parliamentary biography gives his year of birth as 1830, which would make his age at death as 74–75.)

== Notes ==
New South Wales Legislative Assembly
Preceded by George Cass; Sir Patrick Jennings	Member for Bogan; 1887–1889; Served alongside: John Kelly	Succeeded by William A'Beckett; William Alison; George Cass
