= William Inglis (auctioneer) =

Australian auctioneer

William Inglis (8 March 1832 – 12 January 1896) was an Australian auctioneer and stock agent.

He was born in Sydney to merchant Thomas Inglis and Catherine Ross. He was five years a whaler and then a goldminer in the Ovens Valley before returning to his parents' property near Camden. On 3 March 1858 he married Flora McKinnon. He entered into an auctioneering partnership with Joseph Butler in 1867, which he ran alone from 1877. It continues today as William Inglis & Son.

He conducted his business between Castlereagh and Pitt streets, where he had a "horse bazaar". He ran unsuccessfully for the New South Wales Legislative Assembly in 1889 as a Protectionist candidate for Balmain. A banquet was given in his honour in 1895. Known for his trademark top hat, Inglis died at his home in Leichhardt. Two of his sons, John and William, followed him in the auctioneering trade.
