= William Alison (politician) =

Australian politician

William Alison (1856 – 12 September 1931) was a Scottish-born Australian politician.

He was born in Strathaven to pastoralists William and Eliza Alison. He was educated at Bury St Edmunds, and arrived in New South Wales in 1871. He eventually owned property near Nyngan, and was prominent in the Pastoralists' Union, serving as inaugural vice-president and later president. On 29 June 1887 he married Ellen Maud Milson, with whom he had three children.

In 1889 Alison was elected to the New South Wales Legislative Assembly as the Protectionist member for Bogan, but he did not contest the 1891 election.

Alison died at Moss Vale in 1931.

New South Wales Legislative Assembly
Preceded by John Kelly; Joseph Penzer	Member for Bogan; 1889–1891; Served alongside: William A'Beckett/George Cass	Succeeded by Robert Booth; James Morgan
