= John Kelly (New South Wales politician) =

Australian politician

John Edward Kelly (17 June 1840 – 4 November 1896) was an Australian politician.

== Early life ==
He was born at Swan Reach near Morpeth to settler James Kelly and Mary O'Keefe. He was the storekeeper on the family station, and by the age of eighteen was a head stockman. From 1862 he was a pastoralist in his own right at Bourke. In 1875, he moved to Sydney, where he operated a dairy and sawmill; he also owned a Molong copper mill.

== Family and career ==
On 26 August 1862 he married Margaret Agnes Tierney, with whom he had seven children. In 1887 he was elected to the New South Wales Legislative Assembly as a Free Trade member for Bogan. He was defeated in 1889.

Kelly died at Peak Hill in 1896 and was buried at the Peak Hill Cemetery.

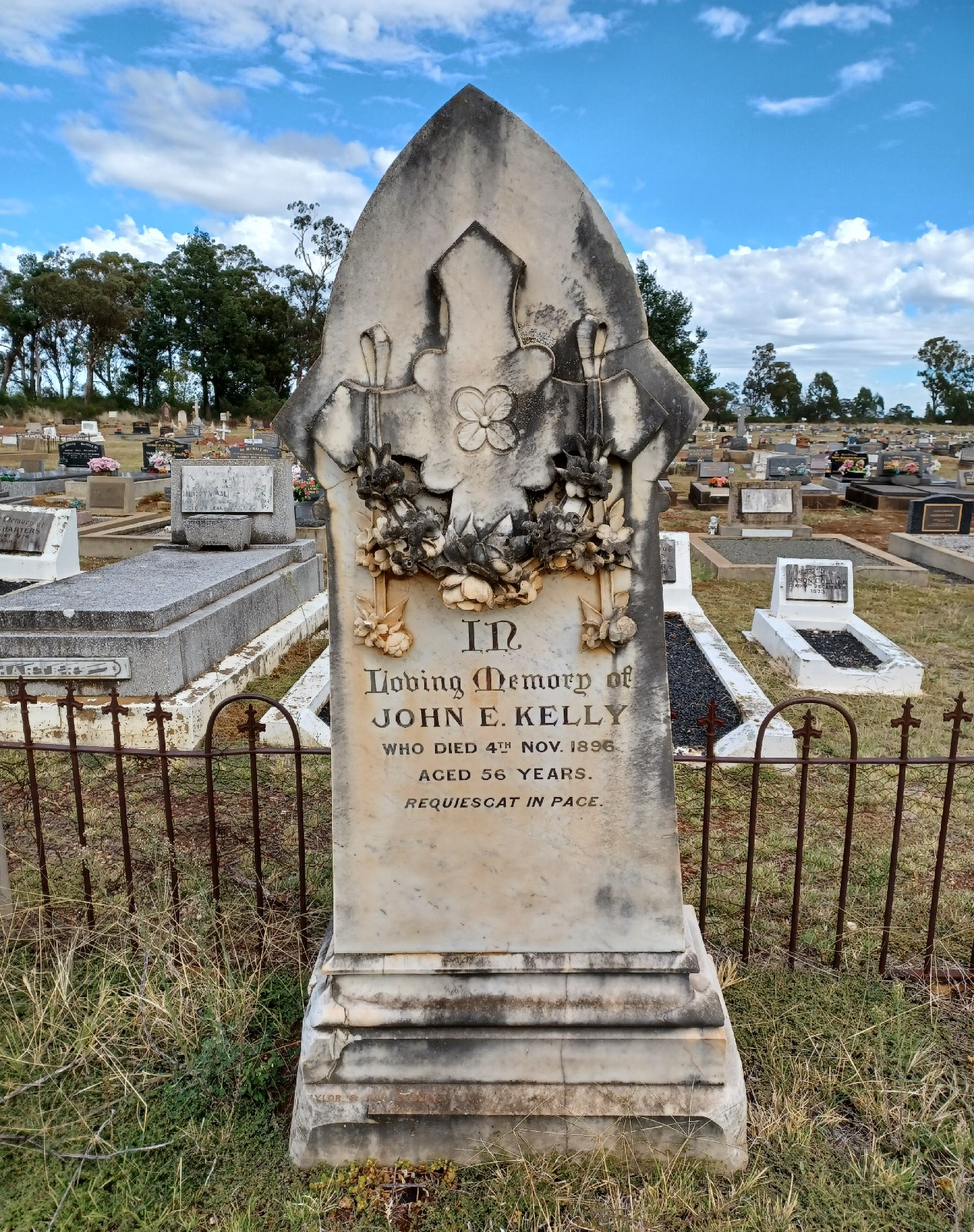
Grave of John Edward Kelly at Peak Hill Cemetery

New South Wales Legislative Assembly
Preceded by George Cass; Sir Patrick Jennings	Member for Bogan; 1887–1889; Served alongside: Joseph Penzer	Succeeded by William A'Beckett; William Alison; George Cass
