= John Plumb (politician) =

Pastoralist and politician in New South Wales, Australia

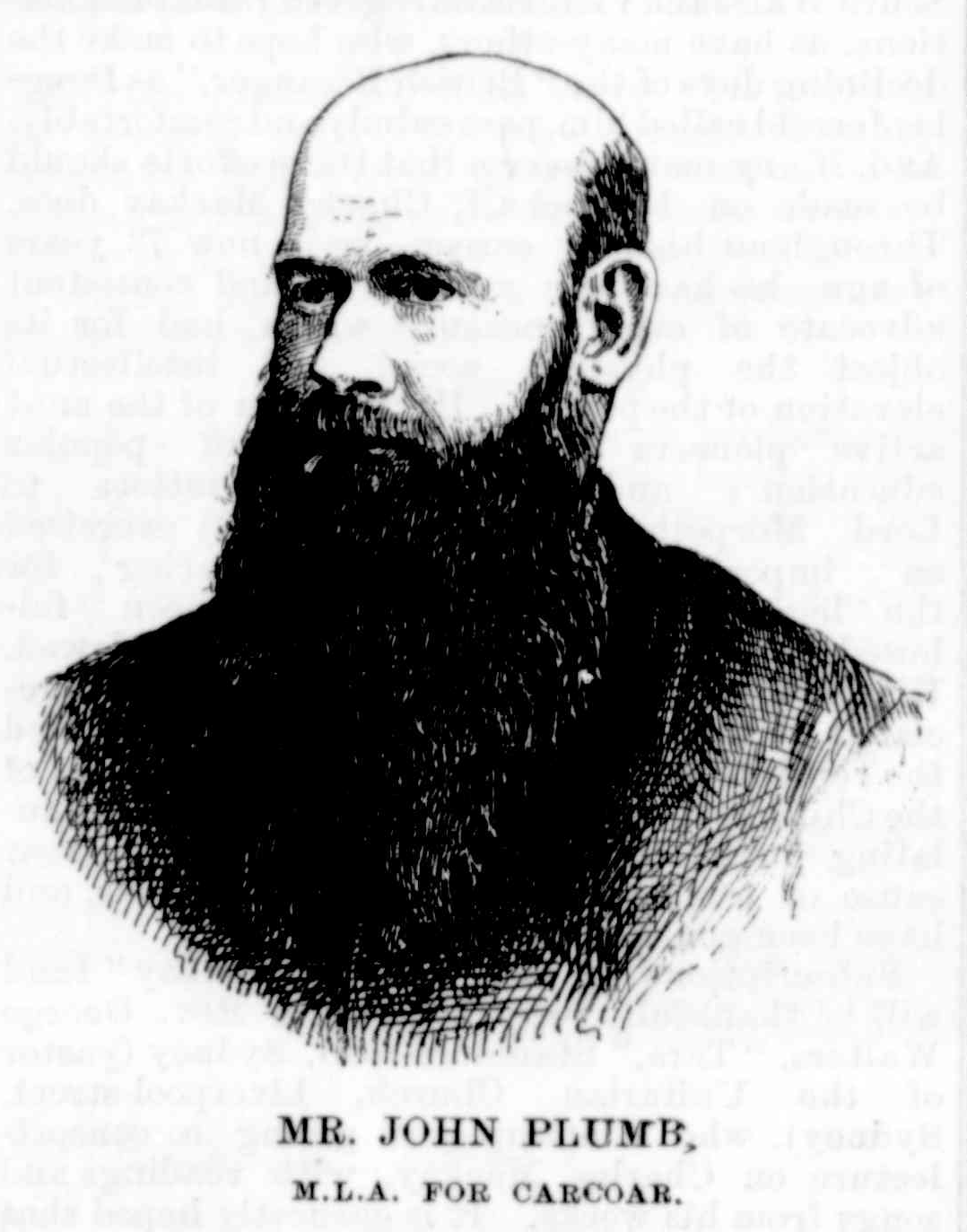

Member of the New South Wales Parliament for Carcoar
- In office 9 February 1889 – 6 June 1891

Personal details
- Born: 23 February 1846 near Goulburn
- Died: 21 July 1891 (aged 45) Woollahra
- Party: Free Trade
- Parent(s): Robert & Elizabeth Plumb

John Plumb (23 February 1846 – 21 July 1891) was a pastoralist and politician in the Colony of New South Wales.

He was born near Goulburn to farmers Robert and Elizabeth Plumb. He attended Goulburn Grammar School and Calder House Academy in Redfern, and became a sheep farmer. He also had interests in mining and contracting. In 1889 he was elected to the New South Wales Legislative Assembly as one of two Free Trade members for Carcoar, serving until his defeat in 1891. Plumb died a month later at Woollahra.

New South Wales Legislative Assembly
Preceded by Charles Jeanneret	Member for Carcoar; 1889–1891; Served alongside: Charles Garland	Succeeded by Denis Donnelly; Charles Jeanneret
