= John Wade (miller) =

Australian cornflour manufacturer

John Wade (c. 1842 – 16 September 1931) was an English-born Australian cornflour manufacturer.

Wade was born in Yorkshire to manufacturer David Wade and Mary Stockwell. The family migrated to Sydney in 1858, and John ran a store at Forbes. On 28 June 1863 he married Margaret Crawford; they had thirteen children. In 1866 he moved to Dungog, where he also ran a store. In 1878 he established a cornflour mill on the Williams River; this proved a success as one of the first cornflour mills in Australia. Wade was also an active Methodist, serving as conference representative and circuit steward. He co-founded the local School of Arts and the Williams River Steam Navigation Company, and twice ran for the New South Wales Legislative Assembly seat of Durham.

In 1888 Wade moved his mill and factory to Sydney, where his brand became widely known. In 1900 his wife, who had been active in Wesleyan charity, died. On 19 August 1903 he married Sarah Jane Clark. He sold out of his company in 1908, and died at Mosman in 1931.
