= Francis Freehill =

Francis Bede Freehill (22 November 1854 – 12 March 1908) was an Australian solicitor and activist.

He was born in Sydney to baker Patrick Freehill and Margaret Cosgrove. His father was also an Irish Catholic organiser, and Francis attended the University of Sydney, where he received a Bachelor of Arts in 1874 and a Master of Arts in 1876. In 1877, he was admitted as a solicitor; he practised in Cowra and Bathurst before inheriting the firm of his brother, Bernard Austin Freehill, in 1880. In 1883, he helped organise John Redmond's visit, and in 1885 became president of the Irish National League in New South Wales. Freehill became a leading spokesman for Irish Catholics in the colony, and made five unsuccessful runs for the New South Wales Legislative Assembly between 1885 and 1895. In 1893, he was one of the founding members of the Australasian Federation League in New South Wales, and he was involved in the "yes" campaign for the establishment of the Commonwealth.

On 14 April 1888 he married Eileen Marie Molony. In 1896 he was appointed Spanish consul, a position he held until his death. He was involved in the raising of the Irish Volunteer Rifles from 1896; he rose to the rank of colonel and retired in 1906. He was created a papal chamberlain in 1903 and was a founder of Lewisham Hospital. He toured Europe in 1907, and died at Lewisham Hospital in 1908. Freehill Tower at St John's College in Sydney University was funded by his widow and named in his honour.

The firm which he inherited from his brother survives as part of the merged international firm Herbert Smith Freehills, and is one of the largest law firms in Australia.
