= Andrew Ross (Australian politician) =

Australian politician

Andrew Hendry Ross (1 August 1829 – 29 January 1910) was a Scottish-born Australian politician.

He was born in Muirkirk in Ayrshire to farmer David Ross and Mary Kerr. He attended local parish schools before studying medicine at the University of Glasgow. He was an assistant medical officer in London and then an assistant sanitary inspector. In 1857 he arrived in New South Wales as the medical officer on an immigrant ship, and established himself as a local doctor at Molong. During this time he was also District Registrar for births, deaths and marriages, coroner, and public vaccinator. He was an alderman from 1881 to 1882, and mayor in 1882. On 7 November 1881 he married Frances Ann Genn, with whom he had two children. Ross was elected to the New South Wales Legislative Assembly in 1880 as the member for Molong. He retained his seat until 1904, becoming associated with the Protectionist Party. With the reduction in size of the Assembly, he contested Orange as an Independent Liberal but was defeated. Ross died at Surry Hills in 1910.

New South Wales Legislative Assembly
New seat	Member for Molong; 1880–1904	Abolished
