= George Cass =

Australian politician

George Edwin Cass (c. 1844 – 6 April 1892) was an English-born Australian politician.

He was born in Greenwich; his father was an engineer also named George Edwin Cass. The younger Cass moved to New South Wales around 1864, becoming a commercial agent. In September 1871 he married Catherine McCubbin near Coonamble; they had nine children. Cass owned a number of regional newspapers at Coonamble, Nyngan and Dubbo. In 1880 he was elected to the New South Wales Legislative Assembly as the member for Bogan. He was defeated in 1887, but returned in 1889 as a Protectionist. He held the seat until his death at Enmore in 1892.

New South Wales Legislative Assembly
Preceded by Walter Coonan	Member for Bogan; 1880–1887; Served alongside: Patrick Jennings	Succeeded by John Kelly; Joseph Penzer
Preceded by John Kelly; Joseph Penzer	Member for Bogan; 1889–1892; Served alongside: Alison/Booth, A'Beckett/Morgan	Succeeded by William A'Beckett
