= Robert Booth (Australian politician) =

Australian politician

Robert Booth (24 May 1851 – 2 March 1901) was an Australian politician.

He was born in Bathurst to farmers Patrick and Elizabeth Booth, and attended school locally and then at Cooks River. He became a solicitor, establishing a practice in Dubbo. He was also involved in agriculture and local politics, becoming an alderman and later mayor of Dubbo. In 1891 he was elected to the New South Wales Legislative Assembly as the Free Trade member for Bogan. He did not contest the 1894 election and made no further runs for colony-wide office. Booth died in Sydney in 1901. He shot himself in the head with a pistol while being driven through The Domain in a horse-drawn cab. A coronial inquest returned a verdict of suicide, and evidence was heard that he had been depressed and suffered from insomnia for some time before his death.

New South Wales Legislative Assembly
Preceded by Robert Butcher	Member for Bogan; 1891–1894; Served alongside: Cass/A'Beckett, Morgan	Abolished
