= Electoral district of Molong =

Former state electoral district of New South Wales, Australia

Molong was an electoral district of the Legislative Assembly in the Australian state of New South Wales, created in 1880 and named after and including Molong. The district was abolished in 1904 as a result of the 1903 New South Wales referendum, which reduced the number of members of the Legislative Assembly from 125 to 90, and the district was divided between the districts of Ashburnham, Belubula and Orange.

== Members for Molong ==
Member	Party	Period
Andrew Ross	None	1880–1887
Andrew Ross	Ind. Protectionist	1887–1889
Andrew Ross	Protectionist	1889–1901
Andrew Ross	Progressive	1901–1904
Andrew Ross	Independent Liberal	1904

== Election results ==
1901 New South Wales state election: Molong
Party	Candidate	Votes	%	±%
Progressive	Andrew Ross	671	55.2	+10.6
Liberal Reform	John Withington	544	44.8	+13.6
Total formal votes		1,215	99.1	−0.1
Informal votes		11	0.9	+0.1
Turnout		1,226	56.6	−4.9
Progressive hold				
