= Electoral district of The Bogan =

State electoral district of New South Wales, Australia

The Bogan was an electoral district of the Legislative Assembly in the Australian state of New South Wales, created in 1859 and named after the Bogan River. It elected two members between 1880 and 1889 and three members between 1889 and 1894. It was abolished in 1894 and partly replaced by Cobar, Dubbo and Coonamble.

== Members ==
(1859–1880, 1 member)
Member	Party	Term						
George Lord	None	1859–1877						
Walter Coonan	None	1877–1880						
(1880–1889, 2 members)
Member	Party	Term	Member	Party	Term			
Patrick Jennings	None	1880–1887	George Cass	None	1880–1887			
John Kelly	Free Trade	1887–1889	Joseph Penzer	Free Trade	1887–1889			
(1889–1894, 3 members)
Member	Party	Term	Member	Party	Term	Member	Party	Term
William Alison	Protectionist	1889–1891	William A'Beckett	Free Trade	1889–1891	George Cass	Protectionist	1889–1892
James Morgan	Labour	1891–1894	Robert Booth	Free Trade	1891–1894	George Cass	Protectionist	1889–1892
James Morgan	Labour	1891–1894	Robert Booth	Free Trade	1891–1894	William A'Beckett	Free Trade	1892–1894

== Election results ==
1892 The Bogan by-election Tuesday 31 May
Party	Candidate	Votes	%	±%
Free Trade	William A'Beckett (elected)	984	37.0	
Protectionist	Michael O'Halloran (Note: Michael O'Halloran was also endorsed as a Labour candidate.)	874	32.9	
Independent	George Plummer	271	10.2	
Independent	William Wilkinson	271	10.2	
Free Trade	John Ryrie	257	9.7	
Total formal votes		2,657	100.0	
Informal votes		0	0.0	
Turnout		2,657	43.5	
Free Trade gain from Protectionist				

George Cass (Protectionist) died.
