= William Channing A'Beckett =

Australian politician

William A'Beckett
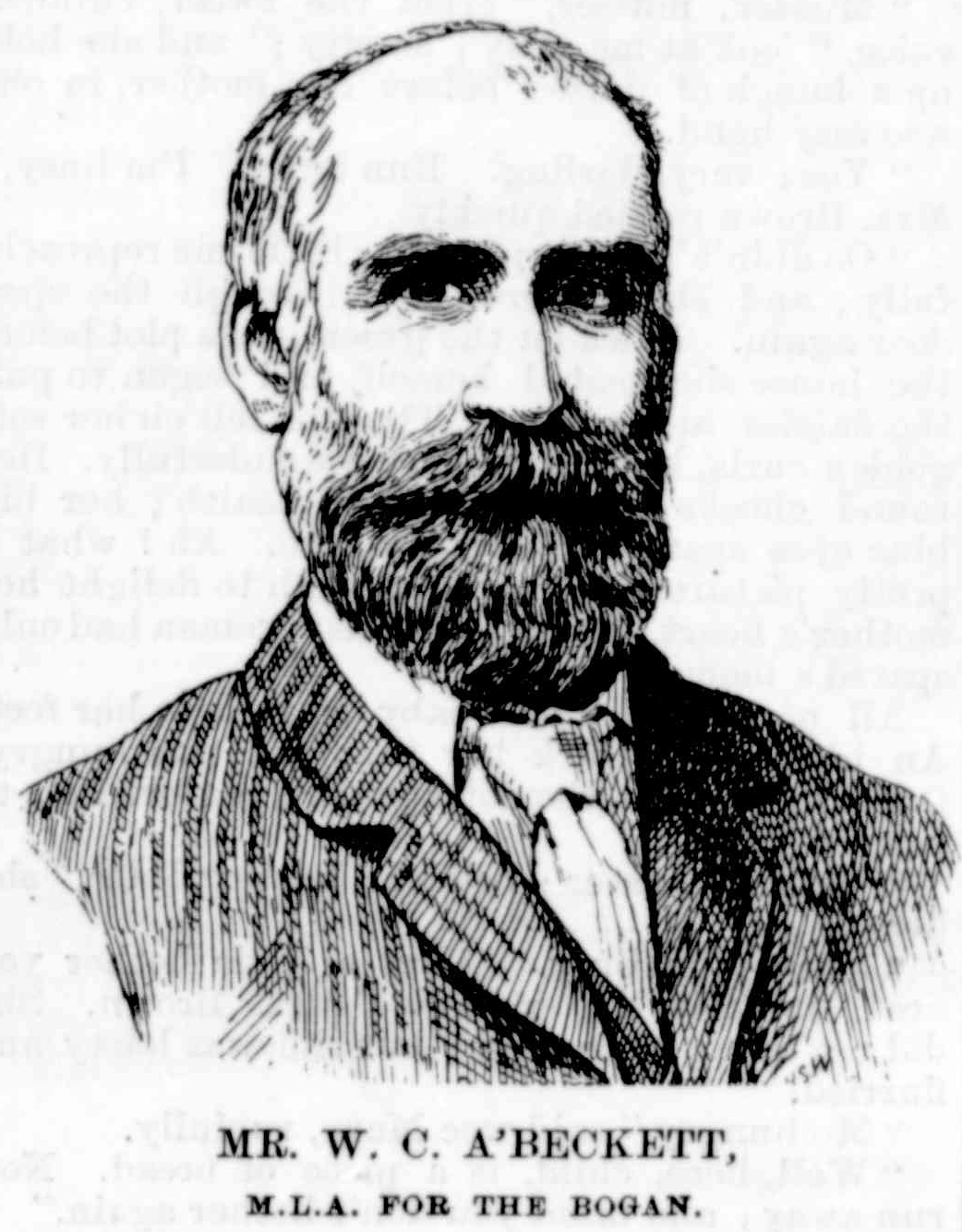

Member of the New South Wales Parliament for Bogan
- In office 13 February 1889 – 25 June 1894

Personal details
- Born: 1846 Sydney
- Died: 16 June 1929 (aged 82–83) Wellington, New South Wales
- Spouse: Jessie Gertrude Smith (married 1884)
- Children: 5
- Parent(s): Arthur Martin A'Beckett; Emma Louise Elwin

William Channing A'Beckett (1846 – 16 June 1929) was an Australian politician.

He was born in Sydney to Arthur Martin A'Beckett, a doctor who served in the New South Wales Legislative Council, and Emma Louise Elwin. He was sent to England to be educated, returning to Australia to farm in New South Wales in 1865. On 23 February 1884 he married Jessie Gertrude Smith, with whom he had five children. He owned property in the Wellington area, and in 1889 was elected to the New South Wales Legislative Assembly as the Free Trade member for Bogan. Defeated in 1891, he was re-elected in a by-election in 1892 but did not contest the 1894 election. A'Beckett died at Wellington in 1929.

New South Wales Legislative Assembly
Preceded by John Kelly; Joseph Penzer	Member for Bogan; 1889–1891; Served alongside: William Alison, George Cass	Succeeded by Robert Booth; James Morgan
Preceded by George Cass	Member for Bogan; 1892–1894; Served alongside: Robert Booth, James Morgan	Abolished
