= Candidates of the 1891 New South Wales colonial election =

This is a list of candidates for the 1891 New South Wales colonial election. The election was held from 17 June to 3 July 1891.

== Retiring Members ==
=== Protectionist ===
- William Alison MLA (Bogan)
- Wyman Brown MLA (Sturt)
- Myles McRae MLA (Morpeth)
- Alfred Stokes MLA (Forbes)

=== Free Trade ===
- Charles Garland MLA (Carcoar)
- Thomas Garrett MLA (Camden)
- Alexander Hutchison MLA (Canterbury)
- Joseph Mitchell MLA (Illawarra)
- John Shepherd MLA (Paddington)
- Edwin Turner MLA (Gunnedah)
- James Wilshire MLA (Canterbury)
- Francis Woodward MLA (Illawarra)

=== Independent ===
- Adolphus Taylor MLA (West Sydney)
- Cecil Teece MLA (Goulburn)

== Legislative Assembly ==
Sitting members are shown in bold text. Successful candidates are highlighted in the relevant colour and marked with an asterisk (*).

Electorates are arranged chronologically from the day the poll was held. Because of the sequence of polling, some sitting members who were defeated in their constituencies were then able to contest other constituencies later in the polling period. On the second occasion, these members are shown in italic text.

Electorate	Held by	Protectionist candidate	Free Trade candidate	Labor candidate	Other candidates
Wednesday 17 June 1891
Balmain	4 Free Trade	William Burns; Samuel Davison; Solomon Hyam; Angus Mackey	**George Clubb**; **Jacob Garrard**; **John Hawthorne**; **Frank Smith**	George Clark*; Edward Darnley*; James Johnston*; William Murphy*	Robert Cropley (Ind FT)
Bathurst	Free Trade	Francis Suttor*	**William Paul**		
Canterbury	4 Free Trade	William Webster	**Joseph Carruthers***; William Henson; Griffith Russell-Jones; **John Wheeler***	Thomas Bavister*; Cornelius Danahey*; John Grant	James Eve (Ind FT)
Central Cumberland	4 Free Trade	Walter Airey; Cyrus Fuller	**David Dale***; **Frank Farnell***; **John Nobbs***; **Robert Ritchie***	John Gannon; John Marshall	John Ferguson (Ind FT); John Forsyth (Ind FT); Thomas Taylor (Ind FT)
East Maitland	Free Trade	John Rigg	**James Brunker***		
East Sydney	1 Protectionist; 3 Free Trade	Edmund Barton*; **Walter Bradley**; William Manning	**William McMillan***; **Varney Parkes***	William Grantham	**George Reid*** (Ind FT)
Glebe	2 Free Trade	Michael Conlon	**Michael Chapman**; **Bruce Smith***	Thomas Houghton*	John Meeks (Ind FT); Fred Walsh (Ind FT)
Goulburn	Independent	Albert Lansdowne	Frederick Furner	Aiden Doyle; Leslie Hollis*	
Hawkesbury	Free Trade		**Alexander Bowman***; William Morgan		
Morpeth	Protectionist	John Bowes*; John Courtney	William Arnold; Malcolm Martin		
Nepean	Free Trade	Thomas Smith	**Samuel Lees***		
Newcastle	2 Protectionist; 1 Free Trade	**Alexander Brown**; **William Grahame***; Thomas Hungerford	**James Curley**; George Webb	John Fegan*; David Scott*	
Newtown	3 Free Trade; 1 New	Richard Bellemy; Wilfred Blacket; James Smith	**Joseph Abbott***; **Nicholas Hawken**; **Edmund Molesworth***; John Salmon	Francis Cotton*; John Hindle*	Marcus Clark (Ind FT); Thomas Midelton (Ind)
Paddington	4 Free Trade	William Allen; William Martin; James Roberts	**Alfred Allen***; Charles Hellmrich; **Robert King**; **James Marks***; **John Neild***	George Dyson	**Jack Want*** (Ind FT)
Parramatta	Free Trade	William Ferris	Tom Moxham; **Hugh Taylor***		
Redfern	3 Protectionist; 1 Free Trade	George Garton; **Peter Howe**; **Henry Hoyle***; **William Schey***	George Anderson; John Beveridge; William Manuell; **William Stephen**	James McGowen*; William Sharp*	William Coombes (Ind FT)
St Leonards	3 Free Trade	Francis Punch	**John Burns**; **Joseph Cullen***; **Sir Henry Parkes***	Edward Clark*	**Jonathan Seaver** (Ind FT)
South Sydney	3 Protectionist; 1 Free Trade	**George Dibbs**; **Walter Edmunds**; **James Toohey***; **William Traill***	Edward Foxall; **James Martin***; John McDonagh; Bernhard Wise*	Frederick Flowers; William Higgs	
West Maitland	Free Trade	Hugh Lusk	John Gillies*; **Richard Thompson**		
West Sydney	3 Free Trade; 1 Independent	John Young	**Francis Abigail**; **Daniel O'Connor**; **Thomas Playfair**; Frederick Woolcott-Waley	George Black*; Thomas Davis*; Jack FitzGerald*; Andrew Kelly*	
Friday 19 June 1891
Albury	Protectionist	**John Wilkinson***	Luke Gulson		
Carcoar	2 Free Trade	Ezekiel Baker; Denis Donnelly*; Alfred Fremlin	Charles Jeanneret*; **John Plumb**		
East Macquarie	2 Free Trade	Alfred Hales	**Sydney Smith***; **James Tonkin***		
Hunter	Free Trade	John Connelly; James Pritchard	**Robert Scobie***		
Kiama	Free Trade	Thomas Kennedy	**George Fuller***		
Patrick's Plains	Free Trade	Alfred de Lissa	**Albert Gould***		
Shoalhaven	Free Trade		**Philip Morton***	John Maclean	
Tenterfield	Free Trade		**Charles Lee***		
Saturday 20 June 1891
Argyle	2 Free Trade	Edward Graham; Thomas Rose*	**Edward Ball**; **William Holborow***		
Camden	1 Protectionist; 2 Free Trade	James Hanrahan; **John Kidd***; William Richardson; John Walters	William Cullen*; **William McCourt***; John Morris		John Campbell (Ind FT)
Hartley	1 Free Trade; 1 New	Evan Jones	George Donald*; **John Hurley**; Charles Passmore; John Tabrett	Joseph Cook*	Thomas Richardson (Ind)
Hastings and Manning	2 Free Trade	Hugh McKinnon*; John Ruthven	**Walter Vivian**; **James Young***		
Orange	2 Protectionist	**Thomas Dalton**; **James Torpy***		Patrick Bourke; Harry Newman*	
Wellington	Protectionist	Michael O'Halloran; Thomas Quirk; **Thomas York***			
West Macquarie	Protectionist	**Paddy Crick***	Charles Boyd		
Monday 22 June 1891
Grafton	Protectionist	**John See***			
Macleay	2 Protectionist	L L Boshell; **Patrick Hogan***; John McLaughlin; Enoch Rudder			**Otho Dangar*** (Ind Prot)
Mudgee	1 Protectionist; 2 Free Trade	George Waldron; **William Wall***	**Reginald Black**	James Cook	**John Haynes*** (Ind FT); Robert Jones* (Ind FT)
Wednesday 24 June 1891
Boorowa	Protectionist	Malcolm Burns; **Thomas Slattery***	Albert Middleton		
Braidwood	Protectionist	Austin Chapman*; **Alexander Ryrie**	George Tompsitt		
Clarence	Protectionist	**John McFarlane***			
Eden	2 Protectionist	**Henry Clarke***; **James Garvan***	William Neilley		William Boot (Ind Prot); Richard Crabb (Ind Prot)
Forbes	1 Protectionist; 1 Free Trade	Joseph Reymond	**Henry Cooke**	Albert Gardiner*; George Hutchinson*	
Illawarra	2 Free Trade	Andrew Lysaght*	Thomas Bissell; Archibald Campbell; Frederick Franklin	John Nicholson*	
Inverell	Protectionist	**George Cruickshank***			
Northumberland	3 Protectionist	**Joseph Creer**; **Ninian Melville***; **Thomas Walker***		Alfred Edden*; James Thomson	
Queanbeyan	Protectionist	**Edward O'Sullivan***	Alfred Conroy		
Richmond	3 Protectionist	Richard Luscombe; George Martin; Samuel Northcote; James Stock			**Thomas Ewing*** (Ind Prot); **Bruce Nicoll*** (Ind Prot); **John Perry*** (Ind Prot)
Tamworth	2 Protectionist	**William Dowel***; **Robert Levien***	William Tribe	Raymond Walsh	
Tumut	Protectionist	**Travers Jones**	Edward Brown*		
Upper Hunter	2 Protectionist	**William Abbott**; **Robert Fitzgerald***	John McElhone; Frederick Morris	Thomas Williams*	
Yass Plains	Protectionist	**Thomas Colls***; Bernard Grogan	William Affleck	Gustavus Herfort	
Thursday 25 June 1891
New England	1 Protectionist; 1 Free Trade; 1 New	**Henry Copeland***; William Proctor; Charles Wilson	**James Inglis***; Edmund Lonsdale*; George Meallin		
Friday 26 June 1891
Namoi	1 Free Trade; 1 New		**Charles Collins***; John Mackay	Job Sheldon*	
Wentworth	Protectionist				**Joseph Abbott*** (Ind Speaker)
Saturday 27 June 1891
Durham	Free Trade	James Boydell; William Donnelly	**Herbert Brown***		
Glen Innes	2 Protectionist	**Alexander Hutchison***; Christopher Legh; **Francis Wright***	George Simpson		
Gloucester	Free Trade	Richard Price	John Hart*		
Grenfell	Free Trade	James Gibson	Thomas Bembrick; **George Greene**	Robert Vaughn*	
Gundagai	Protectionist	**John Barnes***	Henry Deakin		
Gunnedah	Free Trade	Thomas Browne; Michael Burke; Robert Doolan		John Kirkpatrick*	
Young	2 Protectionist		James Gordon; William Lucas	**John Gough***; **James Mackinnon***	
Monday 29 June 1891
Balranald	1 Protectionist; 1 Free Trade	Alexander Cameron; **Allen Lakeman**	**Robert Wilkinson***	James Newton*	
Bogan	2 Protectionist; 1 Free Trade	**George Cass***; Tottenham Richardson; William Wilkinson	**William A'Beckett**; Robert Booth*; Francis Conder	James Morgan*; John Prince	
Molong	Protectionist	**Andrew Ross***	John Hurley	Cornelius Lindsay	
Murray	2 Protectionist	**Robert Barbour***; **John Chanter***	George Chandler		
Murrumbidgee	3 Protectionist	**David Copland**; George Dibbs*; **James Gormly***; Patrick Heffernan	John Peadon	Arthur Rae*	
Wollombi	Protectionist	**Richard Stevenson***	Joseph Gorrick		
Tuesday 30 June 1891
Hume	2 Protectionist	**James Hayes***; Sidney Lindeman; **William Lyne***; John O'Brien	Walter Harper		
Monaro	2 Protectionist	**Henry Dawson***; **Gus Miller***; Charles Welch	Daniel O'Connor		
Sturt	Protectionist			John Cann*	
Wilcannia	Protectionist	**Edward Dickens***			
Friday 3 July 1891
Bourke	3 Protectionist	**William Davis**; Peter Howe*; Austin O'Grady; **Thomas Waddell**; **William Willis***	Edward Millen		Hugh Langwell* (Ind Lab)
Gwydir	Protectionist	**Thomas Hassall***		Leonard Court	

== See also ==
- Members of the New South Wales Legislative Assembly, 1891–1894
