= Results of the 1891 New South Wales colonial election =

Colonial election for New South Wales, Australia in July 1891

New South Wales colonial election, 3 July 1891 Legislative Assembly << 1889–1894 >>
Enrolled voters					
Votes cast	180,449		Turnout	64.40	+4.87
Informal votes	3,680		Informal	2.00	+0.28
Summary of votes by party
Party	Primary votes	%	Swing	Seats	Change
Protectionist	65,866	36.5	-18.8	52	−14
Free Trade	65,850	36.5	−16.0	44	−27
Labor	37,216	20.6	+20.6	35	+35
Ind. Free Trade	6,684	3.7	+3.7	4	+4
Ind. Protectionist	3,627	2.0	+2.0	4	+4
Independent Labor	759	0.4	+0.4	1	+1
Independent	445	0.25	+0.25	1	+1
Total	202,042			141	

The 1891 New South Wales election was for 141 members representing 74 electoral districts. The election was conducted on the basis of a simple majority or first-past-the-post voting system. In this election there were 39 multi-member districts returning 106 members. In these multi-member districts each elector could vote for as many candidates as there were vacancies. 7 of the 35 single member districts were uncontested. The average number of enrolled voters per seat was 2,166, ranging from Wilcannia (1,023) to Sturt (8,306). Sturt was an anomaly, as enrolments had increased by 5,376 since the 1889 election, and the next largest electorate was Canterbury (4,676).

== Election results ==
=== Albury ===
1891 New South Wales colonial election: Albury Friday 19 June
Party	Candidate	Votes	%	±%
Protectionist	John Wilkinson (elected)	670	63.0	
Free Trade	Luke Gulson	393	37.0	
Total formal votes		0	100.0	
Informal votes		1,063	0.0	
Turnout		17	1.6	
Protectionist hold				

=== Argyle ===
1891 New South Wales colonial election: Argyle Saturday 20 June
Party	Candidate	Votes	%	±%
Protectionist	Thomas Rose (elected 1)	1,162	26.8	
Free Trade	William Holborow (elected 2)	1,074	24.8	
Protectionist	Edward Graham	1,061	24.5	
Free Trade	Edward Ball	1,042	24.0	
Total formal votes		4,339	99.6	
Informal votes		19	0.4	
Turnout		2,252	73.4	
Free Trade hold 2				

=== Balmain ===
1891 New South Wales colonial election: Balmain Wednesday 17 June
Party	Candidate	Votes	%	±%
Labour	James Johnston (elected 1)	3,146	13.8	
Labour	William Murphy (elected 2)	2,905	12.8	
Labour	George Clark (elected 3)	2,525	11.1	
Labour	Edward Darnley (elected 4)	2,518	11.1	
Protectionist	Solomon Hyam	2,055	9.0	
Free Trade	John Hawthorne (defeated)	1,820	8.0	
Free Trade	Jacob Garrard (defeated)	1,806	7.9	
Free Trade	George Clubb (defeated)	1,734	7.6	
Free Trade	Frank Smith (defeated)	1,269	5.6	
Protectionist	Angus Mackey	1,080	4.7	
Protectionist	Samuel Davison	737	3.2	
Ind. Free Trade	Robert Cropley	660	2.9	
Protectionist	William Burns	527	2.3	
Total formal votes		22,782	98.5	
Informal votes		339	1.5	
Turnout		6,932	70.8	
Labour gain 4 from Free Trade				

=== Balranald ===
1891 New South Wales colonial election: Balranald Monday 29 June
Party	Candidate	Votes	%	±%
Labour	James Newton (elected 1)	828	30.5	
Free Trade	Robert Wilkinson (elected 2)	705	26.0	
Protectionist	Allen Lakeman	650	23.9	
Protectionist	A L P Cameron	532	19.6	
Total formal votes		2,715	99.2	
Informal votes		22	0.8	
Turnout		1,639	43.2	
Labour gain 1 from Protectionist				
Free Trade hold 1				

=== Bathurst ===
1891 New South Wales colonial election: Bathurst Wednesday 17 June
Party	Candidate	Votes	%	±%
Protectionist	Francis Suttor (elected)	789	51.8	
Free Trade	William Paul (defeated)	733	48.2	
Total formal votes		1,522	99.1	
Informal votes		14	0.9	
Turnout		1,536	75.9	
Protectionist gain from Free Trade				

=== The Bogan ===
1891 New South Wales colonial election: The Bogan Monday 29 June
Party	Candidate	Votes	%	±%
Labour	James Morgan (elected 1)	2,286	23.1	
Protectionist	George Cass (re-elected 2)	1,731	17.5	
Free Trade	Robert Booth (elected 3)	1,517	15.4	
Free Trade	William A'Beckett (defeated)	1,158	11.7	
Labour	John Prince	1,011	10.2	
Protectionist	William Wilkinson	942	9.5	
Protectionist	Tottenham Richardson	843	8.5	
Free Trade	Francis Conder	392	4.0	
Total formal votes		9,880	99.1	
Informal votes		88	0.9	
Turnout		3,648	59.8	
Labour gain 1 from Protectionist				
Protectionist hold 1				
Free Trade hold 1				

One of the sitting members, William Alison (Protectionist), did not contest the election.

=== Boorowa ===
1891 New South Wales colonial election: Boorowa Wednesday 24 June
Party	Candidate	Votes	%	±%
Protectionist	Thomas Slattery (re-elected)	509	66.0	
Free Trade	Albert Middleton	245	31.8	
Protectionist	Malcolm Burns	17	2.2	
Total formal votes		771	98.2	
Informal votes		14	1.8	
Turnout		785	63.2	
Protectionist hold				

=== Bourke ===
1891 New South Wales colonial election: Bourke Friday 3 July
Party	Candidate	Votes	%	±%
Independent Labour	Hugh Langwell (elected 1)	2,089	23.9	
Protectionist	William Willis (re-elected 2)	1,886	21.6	
Protectionist	Peter Howe (elected 3)	1,725	19.7	
Protectionist	Thomas Waddell (defeated)	1,125	12.9	
Free Trade	Edward Millen	942	10.8	
Protectionist	William Davis (defeated)	869	10.0	
Protectionist	Austin O'Grady	102	1.2	
Total formal votes		8,738	99.1	
Informal votes		81	0.9	
Turnout		3,256	49.8	
Independent Labour gain 1 from Protectionist				
Protectionist hold 2				

=== Braidwood ===
1891 New South Wales colonial election: Braidwood Wednesday 24 June
Party	Candidate	Votes	%	±%
Protectionist	Austin Chapman (elected)	586	60.0	
Free Trade	George Tompsitt	230	23.6	
Protectionist	Alexander Ryrie	160	16.4	
Total formal votes		976	97.8	
Informal votes		22	2.2	
Turnout		998	53.4	
Protectionist hold				

=== Camden ===
1891 New South Wales colonial election: Camden Saturday 20 June
Party	Candidate	Votes	%	±%
Free Trade	William McCourt (re-elected 1)	2,316	23.2	
Protectionist	John Kidd (re-elected 2)	1,983	19.9	
Free Trade	William Cullen (elected 3)	1,321	13.2	
Free Trade	John Morris	1,289	12.9	
Protectionist	John Walters	1,164	11.7	
Ind. Free Trade	John Campbell	925	9.3	
Protectionist	William Richardson	705	7.1	
Protectionist	James Hanrahan	288	2.9	
Total formal votes		9,991	98.9	
Informal votes		107	1.1	
Turnout		3,809	65.5	
Free Trade hold 2				
Protectionist hold 1				

=== Canterbury ===
1891 New South Wales colonial election: Canterbury Wednesday 17 June
Party	Candidate	Votes	%	±%
Free Trade	Joseph Carruthers (re-elected 1)	7,231	19.81	
Labour	Thomas Bavister (elected 2)	4,449	12.19	
Labour	Cornelius Danahey (elected 3)	4,375	11.99	
Free Trade	John Wheeler (re-elected 4)	4,349	11.92	
Ind. Free Trade	James Eve	4,344	11.90	
Labour	John Grant	3,857	10.57	
Free Trade	Griffith Russell-Jones	3,690	10.11	
Free Trade	William Henson	2,787	7.64	
Protectionist	William Webster	1,417	3.88	
Total formal votes		36,499	99.32	
Informal votes		250	0.68	
Turnout		10,279	54.96	
Labour gain 2 from Free Trade				
Free Trade hold 2				

The Elections and Qualifications Committee conducted a re-count in September 1891 which overturned the election of John Wheeler and declared that James Eve had been elected.

=== Carcoar ===
1891 New South Wales colonial election: Carcoar Friday 19 June
Party	Candidate	Votes	%	±%
Protectionist	Denis Donnelly (elected 1)	1,124	25.9	
Free Trade	Charles Jeanneret (elected 2)	1,110	25.6	
Free Trade	John Plumb (defeated)	1,103	25.4	
Protectionist	Alfred Fremlin	921	21.2	
Protectionist	Ezekiel Baker	81	1.9	
Total formal votes		4,339	98.8	
Informal votes		51	1.2	
Turnout		2,327	63.2	
Protectionist gain 1 from Free Trade				
Free Trade hold 1				

=== The Clarence ===
1891 New South Wales colonial election: The Clarence Friday 19 June
Party	Candidate	Votes	%	±%
Protectionist	John McFarlane (re-elected)	unopposed		
Protectionist hold				

=== Central Cumberland ===
1891 New South Wales colonial election: Central Cumberland Wednesday 17 June
Party	Candidate	Votes	%	±%
Free Trade	Frank Farnell (re-elected 1)	2,850	15.8	
Free Trade	Robert Ritchie (re-elected 2)	2,491	13.8	
Free Trade	John Nobbs (re-elected 3)	2,435	13.5	
Free Trade	David Dale (re-elected 4)	1,978	11.0	
Labour	John Gannon	1,614	9.0	
Protectionist	Cyrus Fuller	1,449	8.0	
Labour	John Marshall	1,389	7.7	
Protectionist	Walter Airey	1,092	6.1	
Ind. Free Trade	Thomas Taylor	1,016	5.6	
Ind. Free Trade	John Forsyth	964	5.4	
Ind. Free Trade	John Ferguson	740	4.1	
Total formal votes		18,018	99.1	
Informal votes		163	0.9	
Turnout		5,744	57.9	
Free Trade hold 4				

=== Durham ===
1891 New South Wales colonial election: Durham Saturday 27 June
Party	Candidate	Votes	%	±%
Free Trade	Herbert Brown (re-elected)	662	56.3	
Protectionist	William Donnelly	289	24.6	
Protectionist	James Boydell	224	19.1	
Total formal votes		1,175	97.8	
Informal votes		26	2.2	
Turnout		1,201	68.6	
Free Trade hold				

=== East Macquarie ===
1891 New South Wales colonial election: East Macquarie Friday 19 June
Party	Candidate	Votes	%	±%
Free Trade	Sydney Smith (re-elected 1)	961	37.8	
Free Trade	James Tonkin (re-elected 2)	893	35.1	
Protectionist	Alfred Hales	688	27.1	
Total formal votes		2,542	99.5	
Informal votes		12	0.5	
Turnout		1,621	62.4	
Free Trade hold 2				

=== East Maitland ===
1891 New South Wales colonial election: East Maitland Wednesday 17 June
Party	Candidate	Votes	%	±%
Free Trade	James Brunker (re-elected)	632	77.9	
Protectionist	John Rigg	179	22.1	
Total formal votes		811	98.5	
Informal votes		12	1.5	
Turnout		823	62.1	
Free Trade hold				

=== East Sydney ===
1891 New South Wales colonial election: East Sydney Wednesday 17 June
Party	Candidate	Votes	%	±%
Free Trade	William McMillan (re-elected 1)	3,713	19.2	
Protectionist	Edmund Barton (elected 2)	3,535	18.3	
Free Trade	Varney Parkes (elected 3)	3,343	17.3	
Ind. Free Trade	George Reid (re-elected 4)	2,946	15.2	
Protectionist	William Manning	2,260	11.7	
Labour	William Grantham	2,241	11.6	
Protectionist	Walter Bradley	1,328	6.9	
Total formal votes		19,366	99.7	
Informal votes		65	0.3	
Turnout		6,475	64.5	
Free Trade hold 2				
Protectionist hold 1				
Member changed to Ind. Free Trade from Free Trade				

Walter Bradley (Protectionist) won a seat at the 1891 East Sydney by-election and Edmund Barton (Protectionist) held it at this election. George Reid whilst a Free Trader, did not support the Free Trade government of Sir Henry Parkes.

=== Eden ===
1891 New South Wales colonial election: Eden Wednesday 24 June
Party	Candidate	Votes	%	±%
Protectionist	Henry Clarke (elected 1)	1,079	30.3	
Protectionist	James Garvan (elected 2)	1,021	28.7	
Free Trade	William Neilley	603	17.0	
Ind. Protectionist	William Boot	510	14.3	
Ind. Protectionist	Richard Crabb	344	9.7	
Total formal votes		3,557	97.5	
Informal votes		90	2.5	
Turnout		2,690	72.4	
Protectionist hold 2				

=== Forbes ===
1891 New South Wales colonial election: Forbes Wednesday 24 June
Party	Candidate	Votes	%	±%
Labour	Albert Gardiner (elected 1)	1,030	27.9	
Labour	George Hutchinson (elected 2)	1,027	27.8	
Free Trade	Henry Cooke (defeated)	866	23.5	
Protectionist	Joseph Reymond	769	20.8	
Total formal votes		3,692	99.2	
Informal votes		29	0.8	
Turnout		2,200	61.3	
Labour gain 1 from Protectionist and gain 1 from Free Trade				

=== The Glebe ===
1891 New South Wales colonial election: The Glebe Wednesday 17 June
Party	Candidate	Votes	%	±%
Free Trade	Bruce Smith (re-elected 1)	1,479	23.7	
Labour	Thomas Houghton (elected 2)	1,472	23.6	
Protectionist	Michael Conlon	1,383	22.2	
Free Trade	Michael Chapman (defeated)	1,112	17.9	
Ind. Free Trade	John Meeks	581	9.3	
Ind. Free Trade	Fred Walsh	202	3.2	
Total formal votes		6,229	98.9	
Informal votes		68	1.1	
Turnout		3,750	78.9	
Free Trade hold 1				
Labour gain 1 from Free Trade				

=== Glen Innes ===
1891 New South Wales colonial election: Glen Innes Saturday 27 June
Party	Candidate	Votes	%	±%
Protectionist	Francis Wright (re-elected 1)	877	33.7	
Protectionist	Alexander Hutchison (re-elected 2)	747	28.7	
Free Trade	George Simpson	506	19.4	
Protectionist	Christopher Legh	474	18.2	
Total formal votes		2,604	98.8	
Informal votes		31	1.2	
Turnout		1,593	59.0	
Protectionist hold 2				

=== Gloucester ===
1891 New South Wales colonial election: Gloucester Saturday 27 June
Party	Candidate	Votes	%	±%
Free Trade	John Hart (elected)	613	52.5	
Protectionist	Richard Price	555	47.5	
Total formal votes		1,168	99.5	
Informal votes		6	0.5	
Turnout		1,174	70.6	
Free Trade hold				

The sitting member, Jonathan Seaver (Free Trade), unsuccessfully contested St Leonards because of his opposition to the leadership of Sir Henry Parkes.

=== Goulburn ===
1891 New South Wales colonial election: Goulburn Wednesday 17 June
Party	Candidate	Votes	%	±%
Labour	Leslie Hollis (elected)	823	47.9	
Free Trade	Frederick Furner	431	25.1	
Protectionist	Albert Lansdowne	396	23.0	
Labour	Aiden Doyle	69	4.0	
Total formal votes		1,719	98.5	
Informal votes		26	1.5	
Turnout		1,745	68.4	
Labour gain from Free Trade				

=== Grafton ===
1891 New South Wales colonial election: Grafton Thursday 18 June
Party	Candidate	Votes	%	±%
Protectionist	John See (re-elected)	unopposed		
Protectionist hold				

=== Grenfell ===
1891 New South Wales colonial election: Grenfell Saturday 27 June
Party	Candidate	Votes	%	±%
Labour	Robert Vaughn (elected)	593	47.1	
Free Trade	George Greene (defeated)	379	30.1	
Free Trade	Thomas Bembrick	227	18.0	
Protectionist	James Gibson	59	4.7	
Total formal votes		1,258	98.5	
Informal votes		19	1.5	
Turnout		1,277	62.2	
Labour gain from Free Trade				

=== Gundagai ===
1891 New South Wales colonial election: Gundagai Saturday 27 June
Party	Candidate	Votes	%	±%
Protectionist	John Barnes (elected)	887	62.2	
Free Trade	Henry Deakin	540	37.8	
Total formal votes		1,427	97.6	
Informal votes		35	2.4	
Turnout		1,462	64.1	
Protectionist hold				

=== Gunnedah ===
1891 New South Wales colonial election: Gunnedah Saturday 27 June
Party	Candidate	Votes	%	±%
Labour	John Kirkpatrick (elected)	659	54.9	
Protectionist	Thomas Browne	407	33.9	
Protectionist	Michael Burke	76	6.3	
Protectionist	Robert Doolan	58	4.8	
Total formal votes		1,200	96.5	
Informal votes		43	3.5	
Turnout		1,243	53.6	
Labour gain from Free Trade				

=== The Gwydir ===
1891 New South Wales colonial election: The Gwydir Friday 3 July
Party	Candidate	Votes	%	±%
Protectionist	Thomas Hassall (elected)	841	56.4	
Labour	Leonard Court	649	43.6	
Total formal votes		1,490	97.1	
Informal votes		45	2.9	
Turnout		1,535	52.3	
Protectionist hold				

=== Hartley ===
1891 New South Wales colonial election: Hartley Saturday 20 June
Party	Candidate	Votes	%	±%
Labour	Joseph Cook (elected 1)	1,049	31.5	
Free Trade	George Donald (elected 2)	699	21.0	
Free Trade	John Hurley	614	18.5	
Protectionist	Evan Jones	485	14.6	
Free Trade	Charles Passmore	231	6.9	
Free Trade	John Tabrett	153	4.6	
Independent	Thomas Richardson	97	2.9	
Total formal votes		3,328	99.3	
Informal votes		22	0.7	
Turnout		1,822	60.3	
Labour win 1		(1 new seat)		
Free Trade hold 1		(1 new seat)		

=== The Hastings and Manning ===
1891 New South Wales colonial election: The Hastings and Manning Saturday 20 June
Party	Candidate	Votes	%	±%
Free Trade	James Young (re-elected 1)	1,246	25.4	
Protectionist	Hugh McKinnon (elected 2)	1,236	25.2	
Free Trade	Walter Vivian (defeated)	1,231	25.1	
Protectionist	John Ruthven	1,198	24.4	
Total formal votes		4,911	100.0	
Informal votes		0	0.0	
Turnout		2,470	72.8	
Free Trade hold 1				
Protectionist gain 1 from Free Trade				

=== The Hawkesbury ===
1891 New South Wales colonial election: The Hawkesbury Wednesday 17 June
Party	Candidate	Votes	%	±%
Free Trade	Alexander Bowman (elected)	883	51.2	
Free Trade	William Morgan	841	48.8	
Total formal votes		1,724	98.5	
Informal votes		26	1.5	
Turnout		1,750	66.9	
Free Trade hold				

=== The Hume ===
1891 New South Wales colonial election: The Hume Tuesday 30 June
Party	Candidate	Votes	%	±%
Protectionist	William Lyne (elected 1)	1,240	36.6	
Protectionist	James Hayes (elected 2)	1,175	34.7	
Free Trade	Walter Harper	448	13.2	
Protectionist	John O'Brien	428	12.6	
Protectionist	Sidney Lindeman	99	2.9	
Total formal votes		3,390	98.9	
Informal votes		39	1.1	
Turnout		1,889	59.1	
Protectionist hold 2				

=== The Hunter ===
1891 New South Wales colonial election: The Hunter Friday 19 June
Party	Candidate	Votes	%	±%
Free Trade	Robert Scobie (elected)	677	49.6	
Protectionist	James Pritchard	455	33.4	
Protectionist	John Connelly	232	17.0	
Total formal votes		1,364	98.0	
Informal votes		28	2.0	
Turnout		1,392	70.3	
Free Trade hold				

=== Illawarra ===
1891 New South Wales colonial election: Illawarra Wednesday 24 June
Party	Candidate	Votes	%	±%
Labour	John Nicholson (elected 1)	1,180	35.7	
Protectionist	Andrew Lysaght Sr. (elected 2)	799	24.2	
Free Trade	Archibald Campbell	669	20.2	
Free Trade	Thomas Bissell	463	14.0	
Free Trade	Frederick Franklin	195	5.9	
Total formal votes		3,306	99.5	
Informal votes		16	0.5	
Turnout		2,570	78.5	
Labour gain 1 from Free Trade				
Protectionist gain 1 from Free Trade				

=== Inverell ===
1891 New South Wales colonial election: Inverell Saturday, 20 June
Party	Candidate	Votes	%	±%
Protectionist	George Cruickshank	unopposed		
Protectionist hold				

=== Kiama ===
1891 New South Wales colonial election: Kiama Friday 19 June
Party	Candidate	Votes	%	±%
Free Trade	George Fuller (elected)	894	69.0	
Protectionist	Thomas Kennedy	402	31.0	
Total formal votes		1,296	97.8	
Informal votes		29	2.2	
Turnout		1,325	71.7	
Free Trade hold				

=== The Macleay ===
1891 New South Wales colonial election: The Macleay Monday 22 June
Party	Candidate	Votes	%	±%
Ind. Protectionist	Otho Dangar (re-elected 1)	1,042	27.7	
Protectionist	Patrick Hogan (re-elected 2)	761	20.2	
Protectionist	John McLaughlin	721	19.2	
Protectionist	E Rudder	683	18.1	
Protectionist	L Boshell	558	14.8	
Total formal votes		3,765	99.5	
Informal votes		21	0.6	
Turnout		2,225	70.7	
Protectionist hold 1				
Member changed to Ind. Protectionist from Protectionist				

Otho Dangar whilst a Protectionist, supported the Free Trade government of Sir Henry Parkes.

=== Molong ===
1891 New South Wales colonial election: Molong Monday 29 June
Party	Candidate	Votes	%	±%
Protectionist	Andrew Ross (re-elected)	844	62.4	
Labour	Cornelius Lindsay	319	23.6	
Free Trade	John Hurley	189	14.0	
Total formal votes		1,352	97.5	
Informal votes		35	2.5	
Turnout		1,387	65.2	
Protectionist hold				

=== Monaro ===
1891 New South Wales colonial election: Monaro Tuesday 30 June
Party	Candidate	Votes	%	±%
Protectionist	Henry Dawson (re-elected 1)	1,117	30.9	
Protectionist	Gus Miller (re-elected 2)	1,103	30.5	
Free Trade	Daniel O'Connor	800	22.1	
Protectionist	Charles Welch	595	16.5	
Total formal votes		3,615	99.5	
Informal votes		18	0.5	
Turnout		2,033	59.8	
Protectionist hold 2				

=== Morpeth ===
1891 New South Wales colonial election: Morpeth Wednesday 17 June
Party	Candidate	Votes	%	±%
Protectionist	John Bowes (elected)	509	53.6	
Free Trade	William Arnold	357	37.6	
Protectionist	John Courtney	50	5.3	
Free Trade	Malcolm Martin	33	3.5	
Total formal votes		949	98.4	
Informal votes		15	1.6	
Turnout		964	75.4	
Protectionist hold				

=== Mudgee ===
1891 New South Wales colonial election: Mudgee Monday 22 June
Party	Candidate	Votes	%	±%
Ind. Free Trade	John Haynes (re-elected 1)	1,521	21.0	
Protectionist	William Wall (re-elected 2)	1,343	18.5	
Ind. Free Trade	Robert Jones (elected 3)	1,290	17.8	
Free Trade	Reginald Black (defeated)	1,218	16.8	
Protectionist	George Waldron	1,049	14.5	
Labour	James Cook	836	11.5	
Total formal votes		7,257	99.6	
Informal votes		27	0.4	
Turnout		2,797	68.5	
Member changed to Ind. Free Trade from Free Trade				
Protectionist hold 1				
Ind. Free Trade gain 1 from Free Trade				

John Haynes and Robert Jones whilst Free Traders, did not support the Free Trade government of Sir Henry Parkes.

=== The Murray ===
1891 New South Wales colonial election: The Murray Monday 29 June
Party	Candidate	Votes	%	±%
Protectionist	John Chanter (elected 1)	956	39.1	
Protectionist	Robert Barbour (elected 2)	918	37.5	
Free Trade	George Chandler	573	23.4	
Total formal votes		2,447	99.3	
Informal votes		17	0.7	
Turnout		1,473	48.9	
Protectionist hold 2				

=== The Murrumbidgee ===
1891 New South Wales colonial election: The Murrumbidgee Monday 29 June
Party	Candidate	Votes	%	±%
Protectionist	James Gormly (re-elected 1)	2,718	29.6	
Labour	Arthur Rae (elected 2)	2,265	24.7	
Protectionist	George Dibbs (re-elected 3)	1,790	19.5	
Protectionist	Patrick Heffernan	1,117	12.2	
Protectionist	David Copland (defeated)	690	7.5	
Free Trade	John Peadon	603	6.6	
Total formal votes		9,183	99.5	
Informal votes		50	0.5	
Turnout		3,975	52.3	
Protectionist hold 2				
Labour gain 1 from Protectionist				

=== The Namoi ===
1891 New South Wales colonial election: The Namoi Friday 26 June
Party	Candidate	Votes	%	±%
Labour	Job Sheldon (elected 1)	995	39.5	
Free Trade	Charles Collins (re-elected 2)	825	32.8	
Free Trade	John Mackay	697	27.7	
Total formal votes		2,517	99.6	
Informal votes		11	0.4	
Turnout		1,660	51.6	
Labour win 1		(1 new seat)		
Free Trade hold 1		(1 new seat)		

=== The Nepean ===
1891 New South Wales colonial election: The Nepean Wednesday 17 June
Party	Candidate	Votes	%	±%
Free Trade	Samuel Lees (re-elected)	1,079	55.8	
Protectionist	Thomas Smith	856	44.2	
Total formal votes		1,935	99.4	
Informal votes		11	0.6	
Turnout		1,946	72.2	
Free Trade hold				

=== Newcastle ===
1891 New South Wales colonial election: Newcastle Wednesday 17 June
Party	Candidate	Votes	%	±%
Labour	David Scott (elected 1)	2,912	18.5	
Labour	John Fegan (elected 2)	2,882	18.3	
Protectionist	William Grahame (re-elected 3)	2,707	17.2	
Protectionist	Alexander Brown (defeated)	2,533	16.1	
Free Trade	James Curley (defeated)	2,504	15.9	
Protectionist	Thomas Hungerford	1,273	8.1	
Free Trade	George Webb	910	5.8	
Total formal votes		15,721	99.1	
Informal votes		141	0.9	
Turnout		5,979	76.9	
Labour gain 2 from Protectionist				
Protectionist hold 1				

James Curley (Free Trade) had won a seat from William Grahame (Protectionist) at the 1889 by-election. William Grahame regained a seat at the 1891 by-election following the death of James Fletcher (Protectionist).

=== New England ===
1891 New South Wales colonial election: New England Thursday 25 June
Party	Candidate	Votes	%	±%
Free Trade	James Inglis (re-elected 1)	1,731	19.5	
Protectionist	Henry Copeland (re-elected 2)	1,563	17.6	
Free Trade	Edmund Lonsdale (elected 3)	1,544	17.4	
Protectionist	Charles Wilson	1,399	15.7	
Free Trade	George Meallin	1,353	15.2	
Protectionist	William Proctor	1,311	14.7	
Total formal votes		8,901	99.5	
Informal votes		42	0.5	
Turnout		3,247	60.8	
Free Trade hold 1, win 1		(1 new seat)		
Protectionist hold 1		(1 new seat)		

=== Newtown ===
1891 New South Wales colonial election: Newtown Wednesday 17 June
Party	Candidate	Votes	%	±%
Labour	Francis Cotton (elected 1)	2,572	14.1	
Labour	John Hindle (elected 2)	2,411	13.2	
Free Trade	Joseph Abbott (re-elected 3)	2,173	11.9	
Free Trade	Edmund Molesworth (re-elected 4)	2,136	11.7	
Free Trade	John Salmon	1,576	8.6	
Free Trade	Nicholas Hawken (defeated)	1,488	8.1	
Protectionist	Richard Bellemey	1,400	7.7	
Protectionist	Wilfred Blacket	1,353	7.4	
Independent	Thomas Midelton	1,327	7.3	
Protectionist	James Smith	1,098	6.0	
Ind. Free Trade	Marcus Clark	759	4.2	
Total formal votes		18,293	99.2	
Informal votes		140	0.8	
Turnout		5,555	68.1	
Labour win 1, gain 1 from Free Trade		(1 new seat)		
Free Trade hold 2		(1 new seat)		

=== Northumberland ===
1891 New South Wales colonial election: Northumberland Wednesday 24 June
Party	Candidate	Votes	%	±%
Protectionist	Thomas Walker (re-elected 1)	3,686	26.2	
Protectionist	Ninian Melville (re-elected 2)	2,892	20.5	
Labour	Alfred Edden (elected 3)	2,879	20.4	
Labour	James Thompson	2,551	18.1	
Protectionist	Joseph Creer (defeated)	2,089	14.8	
Total formal votes		14,097	99.6	
Informal votes		52	0.4	
Turnout		5,396	72.5	
Protectionist hold 2				
Labour gain 1 from Protectionist				

=== Orange ===
1891 New South Wales colonial election: Orange Saturday 20 June
Party	Candidate	Votes	%	±%
Labour	Harry Newman (elected 1)	1,073	26.7	
Protectionist	James Torpy (re-elected 2)	1,045	26.0	
Protectionist	Thomas Dalton (defeated)	1,036	25.8	
Labour	Patrick Bourke	860	21.4	
Total formal votes		4,014	99.3	
Informal votes		28	0.7	
Turnout		2,168	70.1	
Labour gain 1 from Protectionist				
Protectionist hold 1				

=== Paddington ===
1891 New South Wales colonial election: Paddington Wednesday 17 June
Party	Candidate	Votes	%	±%
Free Trade	John Neild (elected 1)	3,275	14.7	
Ind. Free Trade	Jack Want (re-elected 2)	3,092	13.9	
Free Trade	James Marks (elected 3)	2,776	12.5	
Free Trade	Alfred Allen (re-elected 4)	2,698	12.1	
Labour	George Dyson	2,604	11.7	
Free Trade	Robert King (defeated)	2,076	9.3	
Free Trade	Charles Hellmrich	1,667	7.5	
Protectionist	William Martin	1,552	7.0	
Protectionist	William Allen	1,353	6.1	
Protectionist	James Roberts	1,162	5.2	
Total formal votes		22,255	99.1	
Informal votes		192	0.9	
Turnout		7,115	68.4	
Free Trade hold 3				
Member changed to Ind. Free Trade from Free Trade				

Jack Want whilst a Free Trader, did not support the Free Trade government of Sir Henry Parkes.

=== Parramatta ===
1891 New South Wales colonial election: Parramatta Wednesday 17 June
Party	Candidate	Votes	%	±%
Free Trade	Hugh Taylor (re-elected)	664	41.2	−31.5
Protectionist	William Ferris	489	30.3	+3.0
Free Trade	Tom Moxham	459	28.5	+28.5
Total formal votes		1,612	98.6	+0.6
Informal votes		23	1.4	−0.6
Turnout		1,635	75.5	+12.2
Free Trade hold				

=== Patrick's Plains ===
1891 New South Wales colonial election: Patrick's Plains Friday 19 June
Party	Candidate	Votes	%	±%
Free Trade	Albert Gould (re-elected)	790	58.1	
Protectionist	Alfred De Lissa	570	41.9	
Total formal votes		1,360	99.3	
Informal votes		10	0.7	
Turnout		1,370	70.7	
Free Trade hold				

=== Queanbeyan ===
1891 New South Wales colonial election: Queanbeyan Wednesday 24 June
Party	Candidate	Votes	%	±%
Protectionist	Edward O'Sullivan (re-elected)	654	61.6	
Free Trade	Alfred Conroy	407	38.4	
Total formal votes		1,061	98.2	
Informal votes		20	1.9	
Turnout		1,081	66.1	
Protectionist hold				

=== Redfern ===
1891 New South Wales colonial election: Redfern Wednesday 17 June
Party	Candidate	Votes	%	±%
Protectionist	Henry Hoyle (elected 1)	2,982	11.8	
Protectionist	William Schey (re-elected 2)	2,768	10.9	
Labour	James McGowen (elected 3)	2,712	10.7	
Labour	William Sharp (elected 4)	2,686	10.6	
Protectionist	Peter Howe (defeated)	2,632	10.4	
Free Trade	George Anderson	2,629	10.4	
Free Trade	William Stephen (defeated)	2,535	10.0	
Free Trade	William Manuell	2,279	9.0	
Free Trade	John Beveridge	2,184	8.6	
Protectionist	George Garton	1,240	4.9	
Ind. Free Trade	William Coombes	724	2.9	
Total formal votes		25,371	99.1	
Informal votes		219	0.9	
Turnout		7,479	75.1	
Protectionist hold 2				
Labour gain 2 from Free Trade				

William Schey (Protectionist) won a seat at a by-election in 1889 and retained it at this election.

=== The Richmond ===
1891 New South Wales colonial election: The Richmond Wednesday 24 June
Party	Candidate	Votes	%	±%
Ind. Protectionist	Thomas Ewing (re-elected 1)	2,464	23.3	
Ind. Protectionist	Bruce Nicoll (re-elected 2)	2,109	20.0	
Ind. Protectionist	John Perry (re-elected 3)	1,965	18.6	
Protectionist	James Stock	1,621	15.4	
Protectionist	Samuel Northcote	930	8.8	
Protectionist	Richard Luscombe	836	7.9	
Protectionist	George Martin	632	6.0	
Total formal votes		10,557	98.8	
Informal votes		125	1.2	
Turnout		3,989	55.8	
3 Members changed to Ind. Protectionist from Protectionist				

Thomas Ewing, Bruce Nicoll and John Perry whilst Protectionists, supported the Free Trade government of Sir Henry Parkes.

=== Shoalhaven ===
1891 New South Wales colonial election: Shoalhaven Friday 19 June
Party	Candidate	Votes	%	±%
Free Trade	Philip Morton (re-elected)	1,268	60.3	
Labour	John Maclean	836	39.7	
Total formal votes		2,104	98.2	
Informal votes		39	1.8	
Turnout		2,143	76.3	
Free Trade hold				

=== St Leonards ===
1891 New South Wales colonial election: St Leonards Wednesday 17 June
Party	Candidate	Votes	%	±%
Free Trade	Sir Henry Parkes (re-elected 1)	2,510	24.1	
Free Trade	Joseph Cullen (re-elected 2)	2,359	22.6	
Labour	Edward Clark (elected 3)	1,917	18.4	
Free Trade	John Burns (defeated)	1,808	17.3	
Protectionist	Francis Punch	1,345	12.9	
Ind. Free Trade	Jonathan Seaver (defeated)	494	4.7	
Total formal votes		10,433	99.0	
Informal votes		102	1.0	
Turnout		4,532	61.4	
Free Trade hold 2				
Labour gain 1 from Free Trade				

Jonathan Seaver was the member for Gloucester, a staunch free trader who contested St Leonards because of his opposition to the leadership of Sir Henry Parkes.

=== South Sydney ===
1891 New South Wales colonial election: South Sydney Wednesday 17 June
Party	Candidate	Votes	%	±%
Protectionist	William Traill (re-elected 1)	2,917	12.0	
Free Trade	Bernhard Wise (elected 2)	2,808	11.5	
Free Trade	James Martin (re-elected 3)	2,729	11.2	
Protectionist	James Toohey (re-elected 4)	2,662	10.9	
Protectionist	Walter Edmunds (defeated)	2,553	10.5	
Protectionist	George Dibbs	2,510	10.3	
Free Trade	Edward Foxall	2,237	9.2	
Free Trade	John McDonagh	2,136	8.8	
Labour	Frederick Flowers	2,017	8.3	
Labour	W Higgs	1,805	7.4	
Total formal votes		24,374	99.3	
Informal votes		179	0.7	
Turnout		6,754	68.5	
Protectionist hold 2				
Free Trade hold 1, gain 1 from Protectionist				

=== Sturt ===
1891 New South Wales colonial election: Sturt Saturday 20 June
Party	Candidate	Votes	%	±%
Labour	John Cann (elected)	unopposed		
Labour gain from Protectionist				

The sitting member for Sturt, Wyman Brown (Protectionist), did not contest the election.

=== Tamworth ===
1891 New South Wales colonial election: Tamworth Wednesday 24 June
Party	Candidate	Votes	%	±%
Protectionist	Robert Levien (re-elected 1)	916	28.7	
Protectionist	William Dowel (re-elected 2)	887	27.8	
Labour	Raymond Walsh	755	23.6	
Free Trade	William Tribe	637	19.9	
Total formal votes		3,195	98.9	
Informal votes		35	1.1	
Turnout		2,074	52.2	
Protectionist hold 2				

=== Tenterfield ===
1891 New South Wales colonial election: Tenterfield Tuesday 16 June
Party	Candidate	Votes	%	±%
Free Trade	Charles Lee (elected)	unopposed		
Free Trade hold				

=== Tumut ===
1891 New South Wales colonial election: Tumut Wednesday 24 June
Party	Candidate	Votes	%	±%
Free Trade	Edward Brown (elected)	654	53.0	
Protectionist	Travers Jones (defeated)	581	47.0	
Total formal votes		1,235	98.3	
Informal votes		22	1.8	
Turnout		1,257	68.4	
Free Trade gain from Protectionist				

=== The Upper Hunter ===
1891 New South Wales colonial election: The Upper Hunter Wednesday 24 June
Party	Candidate	Votes	%	±%
Labour	Thomas Williams (elected 1)	1,087	32.5	
Protectionist	Robert Fitzgerald (re-elected 2)	1,071	32.0	
Protectionist	William Abbott (defeated)	522	15.6	
Free Trade	John McElhone	496	14.8	
Free Trade	Frederick Morris	174	5.2	
Total formal votes		3,350	99.4	
Informal votes		19	0.6	
Turnout		2,044	59.9	
Labour gain 1 from Protectionist				
Protectionist hold 1				

=== Wellington ===
1891 New South Wales colonial election: Wellington Saturday 20 June
Party	Candidate	Votes	%	±%
Protectionist	Thomas York (re-elected)	448	38.5	
Protectionist	Thomas Quirk	383	32.9	
Labour	Michael O'Halloran	332	28.6	
Total formal votes		1,163	98.7	
Informal votes		15	1.3	
Turnout		1,178	71.0	
Protectionist hold				

=== Wentworth ===
1891 New South Wales colonial election: Wentworth Thursday 18 June
Party	Candidate	Votes	%	±%
Independent	Joseph Palmer Abbott (elected)	unopposed		
Member changed to Independent from Protectionist				

Joseph Palmer Abbott had been elected as a Protectionist however on his appointment as Speaker in 1890 he was listed as an independent.

=== West Macquarie ===
1891 New South Wales colonial election: West Macquarie Saturday 20 June
Party	Candidate	Votes	%	±%
Protectionist	Paddy Crick (re-elected)	510	54.3	
Free Trade	Charles Boyd	429	45.7	
Total formal votes		939	97.8	
Informal votes		21	2.2	
Turnout		960	74.9	
Protectionist hold				

=== West Maitland ===
1891 New South Wales colonial election: West Maitland Wednesday 17 June
Party	Candidate	Votes	%	±%
Free Trade	John Gillies (elected)	670	52.7	
Free Trade	Richard Thompson (defeated)	459	36.1	
Protectionist	Hugh Lusk	143	11.2	
Total formal votes		1,272	97.5	
Informal votes		33	2.5	
Turnout		1,305	80.2	
Free Trade hold				

=== West Sydney ===
1891 New South Wales colonial election: West Sydney Wednesday 17 June
Party	Candidate	Votes	%	±%
Labour	Jack FitzGerald (elected 1)	4,174	15.8	
Labour	George Black (elected 2)	4,078	15.4	
Labour	Andrew Kelly (elected 3)	3,798	14.3	
Labour	Thomas Davis (elected 4)	2,730	10.3	
Protectionist	John Young	2,601	9.8	
Free Trade	Thomas Playfair (defeated)	2,535	9.6	
Free Trade	Daniel O'Connor (defeated)	2,493	9.4	
Free Trade	Francis Abigail (defeated)	2,326	8.8	
Free Trade	Frederick Woolcott-Waley	1,745	6.6	
Total formal votes		26,480	99.8	
Informal votes		66	0.3	
Turnout		7,428	68.6	
Labour gain 3 from Free Trade and gain 1 from Independent				

Adolphus Taylor (Independent) did not contest the election.

=== Wilcannia ===
1891 New South Wales colonial election: Wilcannia Saturday 20 June
Party	Candidate	Votes	%	±%
Protectionist	Edward Dickens (re-elected)	unopposed		
Protectionist hold				

=== Wollombi ===
1891 New South Wales colonial election: Wollombi Monday 29 June
Party	Candidate	Votes	%	±%
Protectionist	Richard Stevenson (re-elected)	795	72.8	
Free Trade	Joseph Gorrick	297	27.2	
Total formal votes		1,092	98.2	
Informal votes		20	1.8	
Turnout		1,112	46.3	
Protectionist hold				

=== Yass Plains ===
1891 New South Wales colonial election: Yass Plains Wednesday 24 June
Party	Candidate	Votes	%	±%
Protectionist	Thomas Colls (re-elected)	709	56.7	
Free Trade	William Affleck	210	16.8	
Protectionist	Bernard Grogan	199	15.9	
Labour	Gustavus Herfort	132	10.6	
Total formal votes		1,250	97.7	
Informal votes		30	2.3	
Turnout		1,280	56.9	
Protectionist hold				

=== Young ===
1891 New South Wales colonial election: Young Saturday 27 June
Party	Candidate	Votes	%	±%
Labour	James Mackinnon (re-elected 1)	1,394	32.6	
Labour	John Gough (re-elected 2)	1,319	30.9	
Free Trade	James Gordon	903	21.1	
Free Trade	William Lucas	657	15.4	
Total formal votes		4,273	98.9	
Informal votes		48	1.1	
Turnout		2,296	72.0	
2 Members changed to Labour from Protectionist				

== See also ==
- Candidates of the 1891 New South Wales colonial election
- Members of the New South Wales Legislative Assembly, 1891–1894
