= Members of the New South Wales Legislative Assembly, 1891–1894 =

Members of the New South Wales Legislative Assembly who served in the 15th parliament of New South Wales held their seats from 1891 to 1894 They were elected at the 1891 colonial election between 17 June and 3 July 1891. The Speaker was Sir Joseph Palmer Abbott.

Name	Party (Note: The 35 Labour candidates elected at this election were the first Labour candidates elected in the Australasian colonies. Due to poor party organisation and disputes over the meaning of the solidarity pledge and the fiscal question, the party caucus split almost from the day of its first meeting. The membership of caucus was extremely fluid with some members (here indicated as Independent Labour) accepting a modified pledge that bound them to vote for the party platform. The second party designations are those for which the member stood at the 1894 election.)	Electorate	Term in office
Joseph Abbott	Free Trade	Newtown	1888–1895
Sir Joseph Palmer Abbott	Independent (Note: Joseph Palmer Abbott had been elected as a Protectionist however on his appointment as Speaker in 1890 he was listed as an independent.)	Wentworth	1880–1901
William A'Beckett ^{5}	Free Trade	Bogan	1889–1891 1892-1894
Alfred Allen	Free Trade	Paddington	1887–1894
Robert Barbour	Protectionist	Murray	1877-1880 1882-1894
John Barnes	Protectionist	Gundagai	1889–1904
Edmund Barton	Protectionist	East Sydney	1879–1887, 1891–1894, 1898–1900
Thomas Bavister	Labour / Free Trade	Canterbury	1891–1898
George Black	Labour (Note: Labour was led by a steering committee of 5,George Black, Joseph Cook, Jack FitzGerald, Thomas Houghton and William Sharp, until 1893 when Joseph Cook became the leader of the party.) / Independent Labour	West Sydney	1891–1898 1910-1917
Robert Booth	Free Trade	Bogan	1891–1894
John Bowes	Protectionist	Morpeth	1887-1889 1891-1894
Alexander Bowman ^{6}	Free Trade	Hawkesbury	1877-1882 1885-1892
Edward Brown	Free Trade	Tumut	1866–1872, 1891–1894
Herbert Brown	Free Trade	Durham	1875–1898
James Brunker	Free Trade	East Maitland	1880–1904
Sydney Burdekin ^{6}	Free Trade	Hawkesbury	1880-1882 1884-1891 1892-1894
Archibald Campbell ^{3}	Free Trade	Illawarra	1891–1903
John Cann	Labour	Sturt	1891–1916
Joseph Carruthers	Free Trade	Canterbury	1887–1908
George Cass ^{5}	Protectionist	Bogan	1880–1892
John Chanter	Protectionist	Murray	1885–1901
Austin Chapman	Protectionist	Braidwood	1891–1901
Edward Clark	Labour / Ind. Free Trade	St Leonards	1891–1904 1907-1910
George Clark	Labour / Free Trade	Balmain	1891–1894
Francis Clarke ^{11}	Protectionist	Macleay	1893–1898 1900-1901
Henry Clarke	Protectionist	Eden	1869–1894, 1895–1904
Charles Collins	Free Trade	Namoi	1885- 1887 1890-1898
Thomas Colls	Protectionist	Yass Plains	1886–1894
Joseph Cook	Labour / Independent Labour	Hartley	1891–1901
Henry Copeland	Protectionist	New England	1877–1883, 1883–1895, 1895–1900
Francis Cotton	Labour / Free Trade	Newtown	1891–1901
Paddy Crick	Protectionist	West Macquarie	1889–1906
George Cruickshank	Protectionist	Inverell	1889–1901
Joseph Cullen	Free Trade	St Leonards	1891–1894
William Cullen	Free Trade	Camden	1891–1894
David Dale	Free Trade	Central Cumberland	1891–1894
Cornelius Danahey	Labour / Ind. Free Trade	Canterbury	1891–1894
Otho Dangar ^{11}	Ind. Protectionist	Macleay	1889–1893
Edward Darnley	Labour / Ind. Free Trade	Balmain	1891–1894
Thomas Davis	Labour	West Sydney	1891–1898
Henry Dawson	Protectionist	Monaro	1885–1894
Sir George Dibbs ^{9}	Protectionist	Murrumbidgee	1874–1877, 1882–1895
Edward Dickens	Protectionist	Wilcannia	1889–1894
George Donald	Free Trade	Hartley	1891–1894
Denis Donnelly	Protectionist	Carcoar	1891–1896
William Dowel	Protectionist	Tamworth	1891–1896
Alfred Edden	Labour / Independent Labour	Northumberland	1891–1920
James Eve ^{2}	Free Trade	Canterbury	1891–1894
Thomas Ewing	Ind. Protectionist	Richmond	1885–1901
Frank Farnell	Free Trade	Central Cumberland	1887–1898 1901-1903
John Fegan	Labour / Free Trade	Newcastle	1891–1907 1920-1922
Jack FitzGerald	Labour / Protectionist	West Sydney	1891–1894
Robert Fitzgerald	Protectionist	Upper Hunter	1885–1901
George Fuller	Free Trade	Kiama	1889–1894 1915-1928
Albert Gardiner	Labour / Independent Labour	Forbes	1891–1895 1904-1907
Jacob Garrard ^{1}	Free Trade	Central Cumberland	1880–1898
James Garvan	Protectionist	Eden	1880–1894
John Gillies	Free Trade	West Maitland	1891–1911
James Gormly	Protectionist	Murrumbidgee	1885–1904
John Gough	Labour / Protectionist	Young	1889–1894
Albert Gould	Free Trade	Patrick's Plains	1882–1898
William Grahame	Protectionist	Newcastle	1889–1894
John Hart	Free Trade	Gloucester	1891–1894
Thomas Hassall	Protectionist	Gwydir	1886–1901
James Hayes	Protectionist	Hume	1885–1904
John Haynes	Ind. Free Trade	Mudgee	1887-1904 1915-1917
John Hindle	Labour / Ind. Free Trade	Newtown	1891–1894
Patrick Hogan	Protectionist	Macleay	1885-1887 1889-1895
William Holborow	Free Trade	Argyle	1880–1894
Leslie Hollis	Labour / Free Trade	Goulburn	1891–1898
Thomas Houghton	Labour / Independent Labour	Glebe	1891–1894
Peter Howe ^{4}	Protectionist	Bourke	1888–1891
Henry Hoyle	Protectionist	Redfern	1891–1994 1910-1917
George Hutchinson	Labour / Ind. Free Trade	Forbes	1891–1994
Alexander Hutchison	Protectionist	Glen Innes	1889–1994
James Inglis	Free Trade	New England	1885–1894
Charles Jeanneret	Free Trade	Carcoar	1887-1889 1891-1894
James Johnston	Labour / Protectionist	Balmain	1891–1894
Robert Jones	Ind. Free Trade	Mudgee	1891–1998 1907-1910
Andrew Kelly	Labour / Protectionist	West Sydney	1891–1894 1901-1913
John Kidd	Protectionist	Camden	1880–1882 1885–1887 1889-1904
John Kirkpatrick	Labour	Gunnedah	1891–1895
Hugh Langwell	Independent Labour	Bourke	1891–1894
Charles Lee	Free Trade	Tenterfield	1884–1920
Samuel Lees	Free Trade	Nepean	1887–1895 1898-1901
Robert Levien	Protectionist	Tamworth	1880–1889, 1889–1913
Edmund Lonsdale	Free Trade	New England	1891–1894 1895-1898 1901-1903
William Lyne	Protectionist	Hume	1880–1901
Andrew Lysaght ^{3}	Protectionist	Illawarra	1885-1887 1891
James Mackinnon	Labour / Protectionist	Young	1882–1894
William Manning ^{8}	Protectionist	South Sydney	1893–1894
James Marks	Free Trade	Paddington	1891–1894
James Martin	Free Trade	South Sydney	1889–1895
William McCourt	Free Trade	Camden	1882-1885 1887-1913
George McCredie ^{10}	Free Trade	Central Cumberland	1893–1894
John McFarlane	Protectionist	Clarence	1887–1915
James McGowen	Labour	Redfern	1891–1917
Hugh McKinnon	Protectionist	Hastings and Manning	1891–1894
William McMillan	Free Trade	East Sydney	1887–1898
Ninian Melville	Protectionist	Northumberland	1880-1887 1889-1894
Gus Miller	Protectionist	Monaro	1889–1918
Edmund Molesworth	Free Trade	Newtown	1889–1901
James Morgan	Labour / Protectionist	Bogan	1891–1895
Philip Morton	Free Trade	Shoalhaven	1889–1898
William Murphy	Labour / Protectionist	Balmain	1891–1894
John Neild	Free Trade	Paddington	1885-1889 1891-1894 1895-1901
Harry Newman	Labour / Free Trade	Orange	1891–1904
James Newton	Labour / Protectionist	Balranald	1891–1894
John Nicholson ^{3}	Labour / Independent Labour	Illawarra	1891–1917
Bruce Nicoll	Ind. Protectionist	Richmond	1889–1894
John Nobbs ^{10}	Free Trade	Central Cumberland	1888-1993 1898-1913
Edward O'Sullivan	Protectionist	Queanbeyan	1885–1910
Sir Henry Parkes	Free Trade	St Leonards	1856, 1858, 1859–1861, 1864–1870, 1872–1895
Varney Parkes	Free Trade	East Sydney	1885–1888, 1891–1900 1907-1913
John Perry	Ind. Protectionist	Richmond	1889–1920
Arthur Rae	Labour / Independent Labour	Murrumbidgee	1891–1894
George Reid	Ind. Free Trade	East Sydney	1880-1884 1885-1901
Robert Ritchie ^{1}	Free Trade	Central Cumberland	1889–1891
Thomas Rose	Protectionist	Argyle	1891–1904
Andrew Ross	Protectionist	Molong	1880–1904
William Schey	Protectionist	Redfern	1887–1898
Robert Scobie	Free Trade	Hunter	1889–1894
David Scott	Labour / Protectionist	Newcastle	1891–1894
John See	Protectionist	Grafton	1880–1904
William Sharp	Labour / Protectionist	Redfern	1891–1894
Job Sheldon	Labour / Protectionist	Namoi	1891–1894
Thomas Slattery	Protectionist	Boorowa	1880-1885 1887-1895
Bruce Smith	Free Trade	Glebe	1882–1884, 1889–1894
Sydney Smith	Free Trade	East Macquarie	1882–1898 1900
Richard Stevenson	Protectionist	Wollombi	1886–1895 1898-1899
Francis Suttor	Protectionist	Bathurst	1875-1887 1891-1894 1898-1900
Hugh Taylor	Free Trade	Parramatta	1882–1894
James Tonkin ^{7}	Free Trade	East Macquarie	1887–1895
James Toohey ^{8}	Protectionist	South Sydney	1885–1891
James Torpy	Protectionist	Orange	1889–1894
William Traill	Protectionist	South Sydney	1889–1894
Robert Vaughn	Labour / Protectionist	Grenfell	1880–1894
Thomas Waddell ^{4}	Protectionist	Bourke	1887–1917
Thomas Walker	Protectionist	Northumberland	1887–1894
William Wall	Protectionist	Mudgee	1886–1895
Jack Want	Ind. Free Trade	Paddington	1885–1894
John Wheeler ^{2}	Free Trade	Canterbury	1889–1891
John Wilkinson	Protectionist	Albury	1889–1895
Robert Wilkinson	Free Trade	Balranald	1880–1894
William Willis	Labour / Independent Labour	Upper Hunter	1891–1894
William Willis	Protectionist	Bourke	1889–1904
Bernhard Wise	Free Trade	South Sydney	1887-1889 1891–1895 1898-1900
Francis Wright	Protectionist	Glen Innes	1882–1885, 1889–1903
Thomas York	Protectionist	Wellington	1889-1891
James Young	Free Trade	Hastings and Manning	1880-1901 1904-1907

By-elections

Under the constitution, ministers were required to resign to recontest their seats in a by-election when appointed. These by-elections are only noted when the minister was defeated; in general, he was elected unopposed.

#	Electorate	Departing Member	Party	Reason for by-election	Date of by-election	Winner of by-election	Party
1	Central Cumberland	Robert Ritchie	Free Trade	Death	29 August 1891	Jacob Garrard	Free Trade
2	Canterbury	John Wheeler	Free Trade	Previous result overturned on appeal (no by-election)	2 September 1891	James Eve	Free Trade
3	Illawarra	John Nicholson	Labour	Previous result voided on appeal	3 October 1891	John Nicholson	Labour
3	Illawarra	Andrew Lysaght	Protectionist	Previous result voided on appeal	3 October 1891	Archibald Campbell	Free Trade
4	Bourke	Peter Howe	Protectionist	Resigned after convicted of conspiracy to defraud	4 December 1891	Thomas Waddell	Protectionist
5	Bogan	George Cass	Protectionist	Death	31 May 1892	William A'Beckett	Free Trade
6	Hawkesbury	Alexander Bowman	Free Trade	Death	23 July 1892	Sydney Burdekin	Free Trade
7	East Macquarie	James Tonkin	Free Trade	Financial Difficulty	13 August 1892	James Tonkin	Free Trade
8	South Sydney	James Toohey	Protectionist	Resignation	13 February 1893	William Manning	Protectionist
9	Murrumbidgee	Sir George Dibbs	Protectionist	Financial Difficulty	6 April 1893	Sir George Dibbs	Protectionist
10	Central Cumberland	John Nobbs	Free Trade	Financial Difficulty	6 May 1893	George McCredie	Free Trade
11	Macleay	Otho Dangar	Protectionist	Financial Difficulty	29 May 1893	Francis Clarke	Protectionist

== See also ==
- Third Dibbs ministry
- Results of the 1891 New South Wales colonial election
- Candidates of the 1891 New South Wales colonial election
