= List of mayors of The Glebe =

People who served as the mayor of the Municipality of The Glebe are:

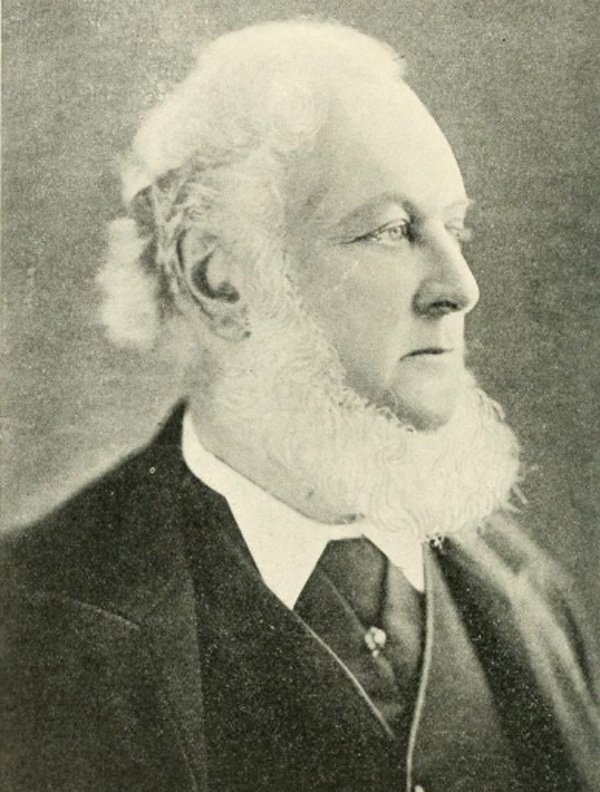
Sir George Wigram Allen (1824–1885), first chairman and Mayor 1859–1878, Speaker of the Legislative Assembly 1875–1882.

Officeholder	Party	Title	Term start	Term end	Notes
George Allen	n/a	Chairman	1 September 1859	23 December 1867	
George Allen	n/a	Mayor	23 December 1867	15 February 1878	
John Henry Seamer	n/a	Mayor	15 February 1878	13 February 1879	
William Cary	n/a	Mayor	13 February 1879	9 February 1880	
Thomas John Dunn	n/a	Mayor	9 February 1880	12 February 1881	
Charles Field	n/a	Mayor	12 February 1881	10 February 1882	
Michael Chapman	n/a	Mayor	10 February 1882	13 February 1885	
Thomas John Dunn	n/a	Mayor	13 February 1885	17 February 1888	
Percy Charles Lucas	n/a	Mayor	17 February 1888	10 February 1890	
George Frederick Burcher	n/a	Mayor	10 February 1890	10 February 1891	
Percy Charles Lucas	n/a	Mayor	10 February 1891	13 February 1892	
William George Yeates	n/a	Mayor	13 February 1892	16 February 1893	
Percy Charles Lucas	n/a	Mayor	16 February 1893	12 February 1894	
William Alston Hutchinson	n/a	Mayor	12 February 1894	13 February 1896	
William Cary	n/a	Mayor	13 February 1896	11 February 1898	
Percy Charles Lucas	n/a	Mayor	11 February 1898	7 February 1901	
Henry Macnamara	n/a	Mayor	7 February 1901	5 February 1903	
Thomas Nosworthy	n/a	Mayor	5 February 1903	15 February 1906	
Percy Charles Lucas	n/a	Mayor	15 February 1906	13 February 1908	
Stanley Cole	n/a	Mayor	13 February 1908	6 February 1911	
Frederick Lewis Artlett	n/a	Mayor	6 February 1911	8 February 1915	
Stanley Cole	n/a	Mayor	8 February 1915	10 February 1916	
Ralph Willis Stone	n/a	Mayor	10 February 1916	19 February 1918	
Henry Punter	n/a	Mayor	19 February 1918	10 February 1919	
Finlay Elgin Munro	n/a	Mayor	10 February 1919	6 February 1920	
Stanley Cole	n/a	Mayor	6 February 1920	31 December 1922	
William Thomas Tate	n/a	Mayor	31 December 1922	13 December 1923	
Henry Punter	n/a	Mayor	13 December 1923	11 December 1924	
Percy Charles Lucas	n/a	Mayor	11 December 1924	10 December 1925	
William Joseph Walsh	Labor	Mayor	10 December 1925	5 December 1929	
Francis Thomas Dick	Labor	Mayor	5 December 1929	4 December 1930	
Albert James Ward	Labor	Mayor	4 December 1930	7 January 1932	
James Diver	Labor	Mayor	7 January 1932	1 December 1932	
Bob Gorman	Labor	Mayor	1 December 1932	7 December 1933	
Matthew Aloysius Fitzpatrick	Labor	Mayor	7 December 1933	7 December 1934	
James Joseph Lahiff		Mayor	7 December 1934	5 December 1935	
Stephen Patrick McCormack	Labor	Mayor	5 December 1935	10 December 1936	
Horace Foley	Labor	Mayor	10 December 1936	December 1938	
Stephen Patrick McCormack	Industrial Labor	Mayor	December 1938	31 May 1939	
Barton Hopetoun Nolan	n/a	Administrator	31 May 1939	8 December 1940	
Harold Charles Splatt	Labor (N-C)	Mayor	12 December 1940	December 1942	
Colin Campbell Colbourne	Labor (N-C)	Mayor	December 1942	December 1943	
William Joseph Beasley	Labor	Mayor	December 1943	December 1944	
Colin Edgar Elphick	Labor	Mayor	December 1944	December 1945	
Albert Henry Lawson	Labor	Mayor	December 1945	December 1946	
Cornelius O'Neill	Labor	Mayor	December 1946	December 1947	
Michael Ward	Labor	Mayor	December 1947	31 December 1948	

Mayors of Glebe

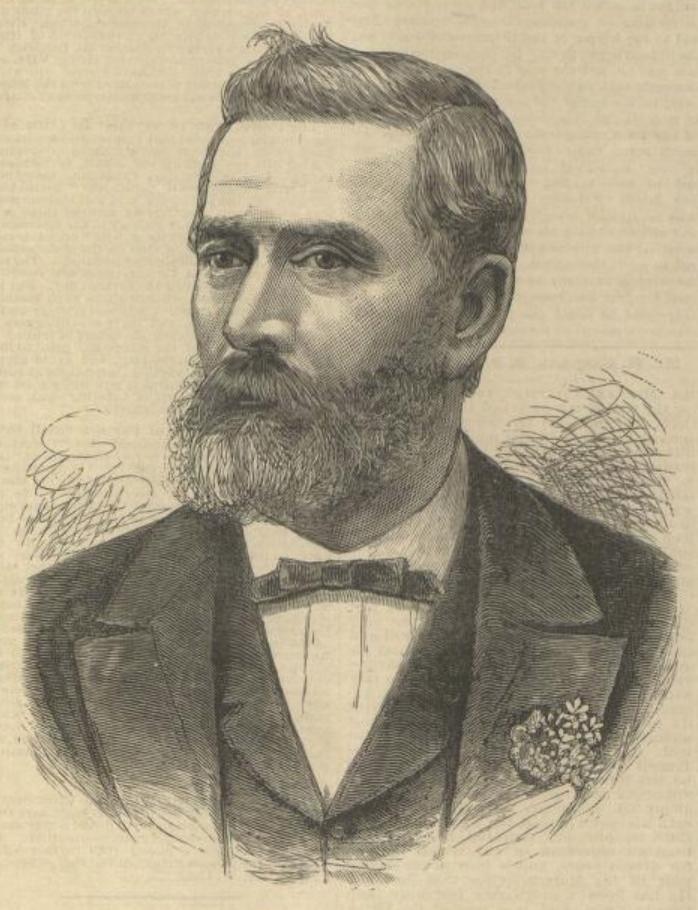
Michael Chapman

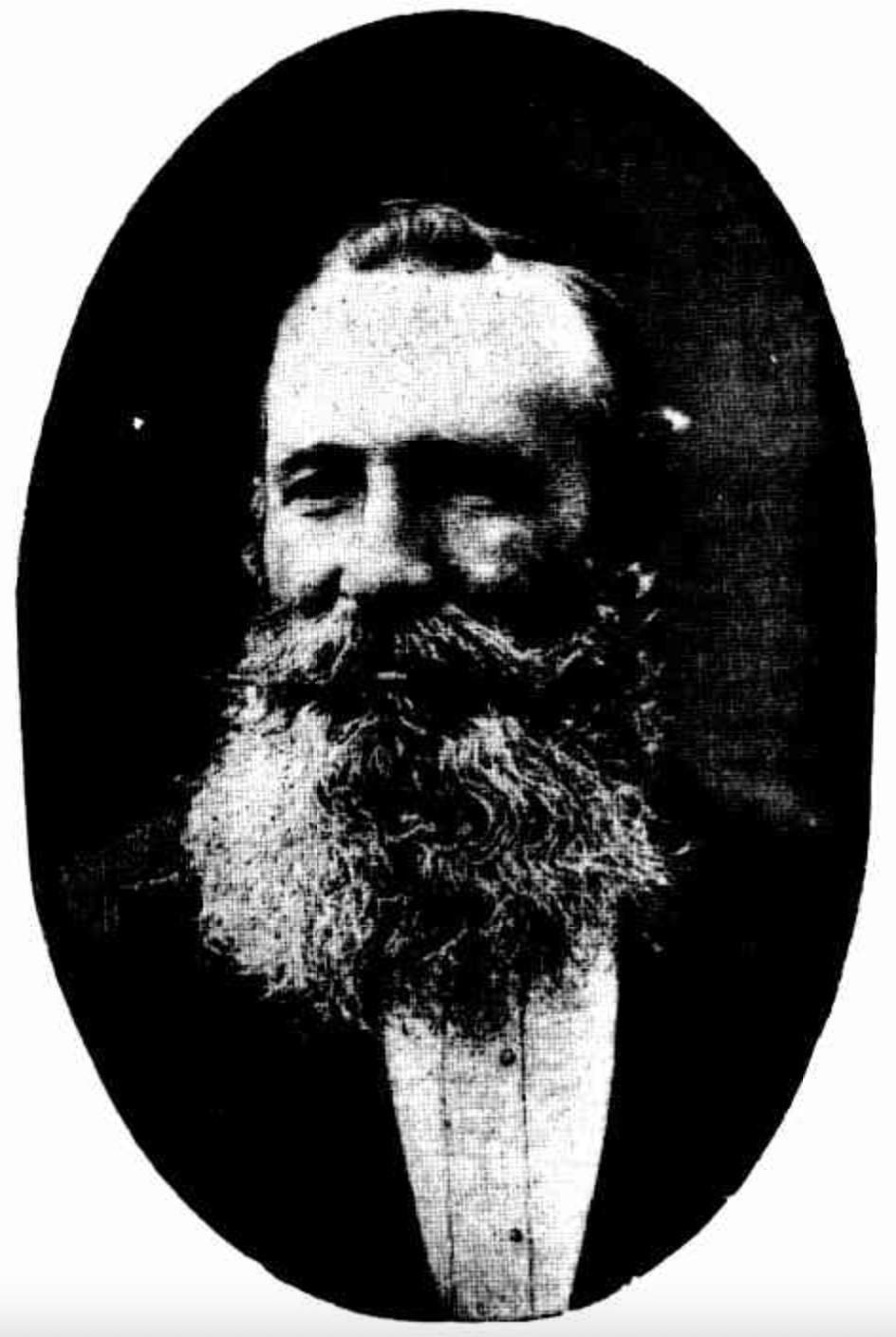
William Alston Hutchinson

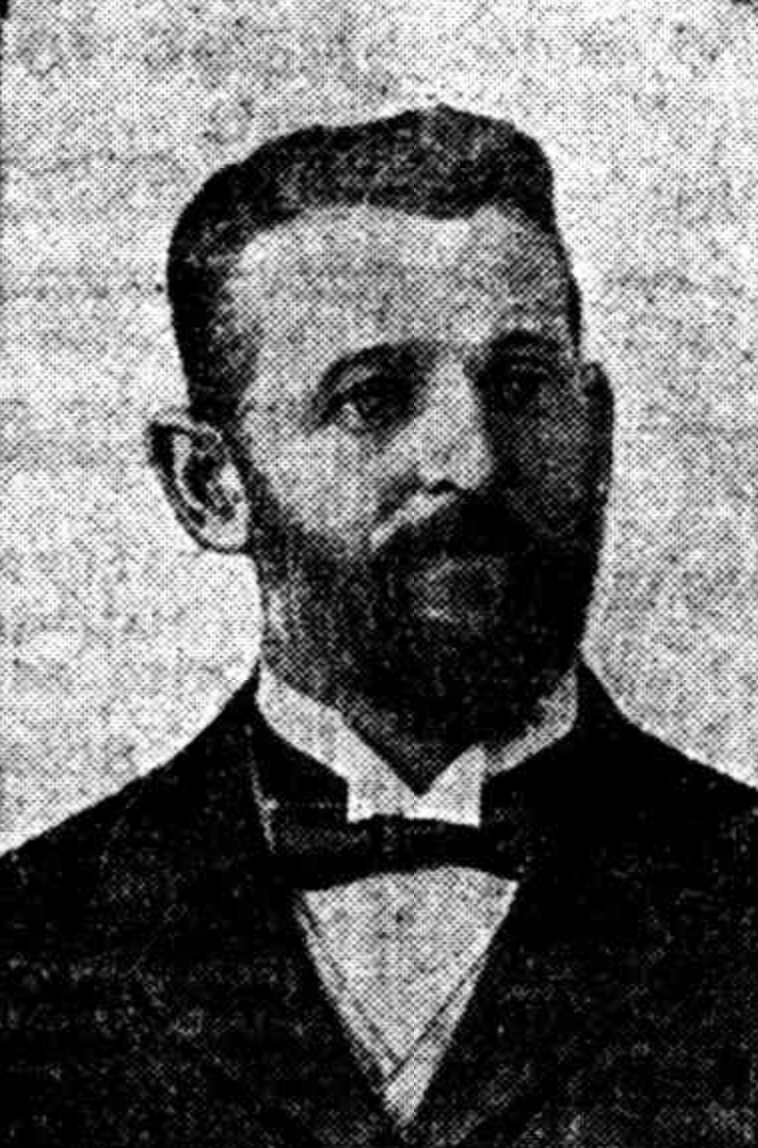
Stanley Llewellyn Cole

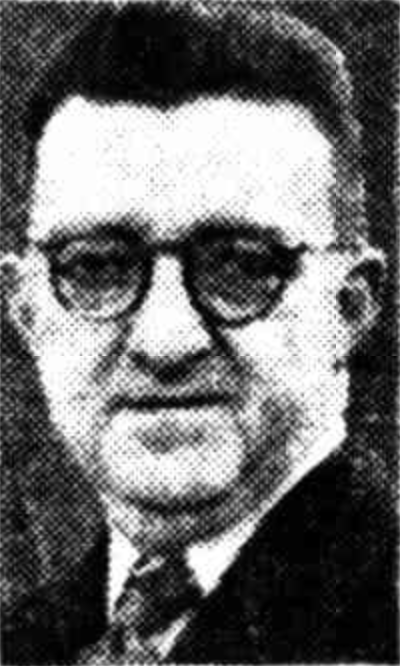
Robert Douglas Gorman

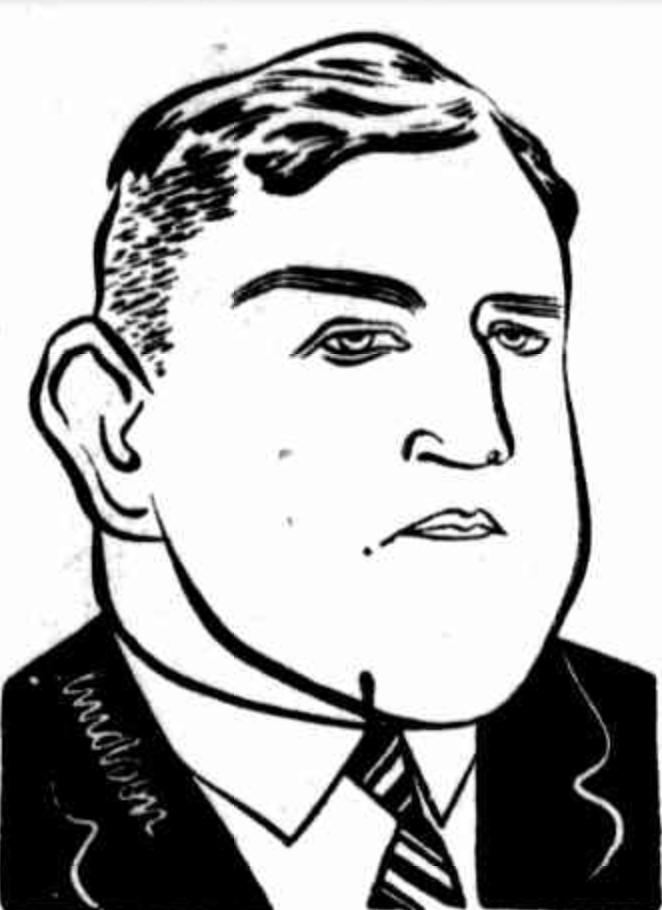
Horace John Foley
