= William Alston Hutchinson =

Australian politician

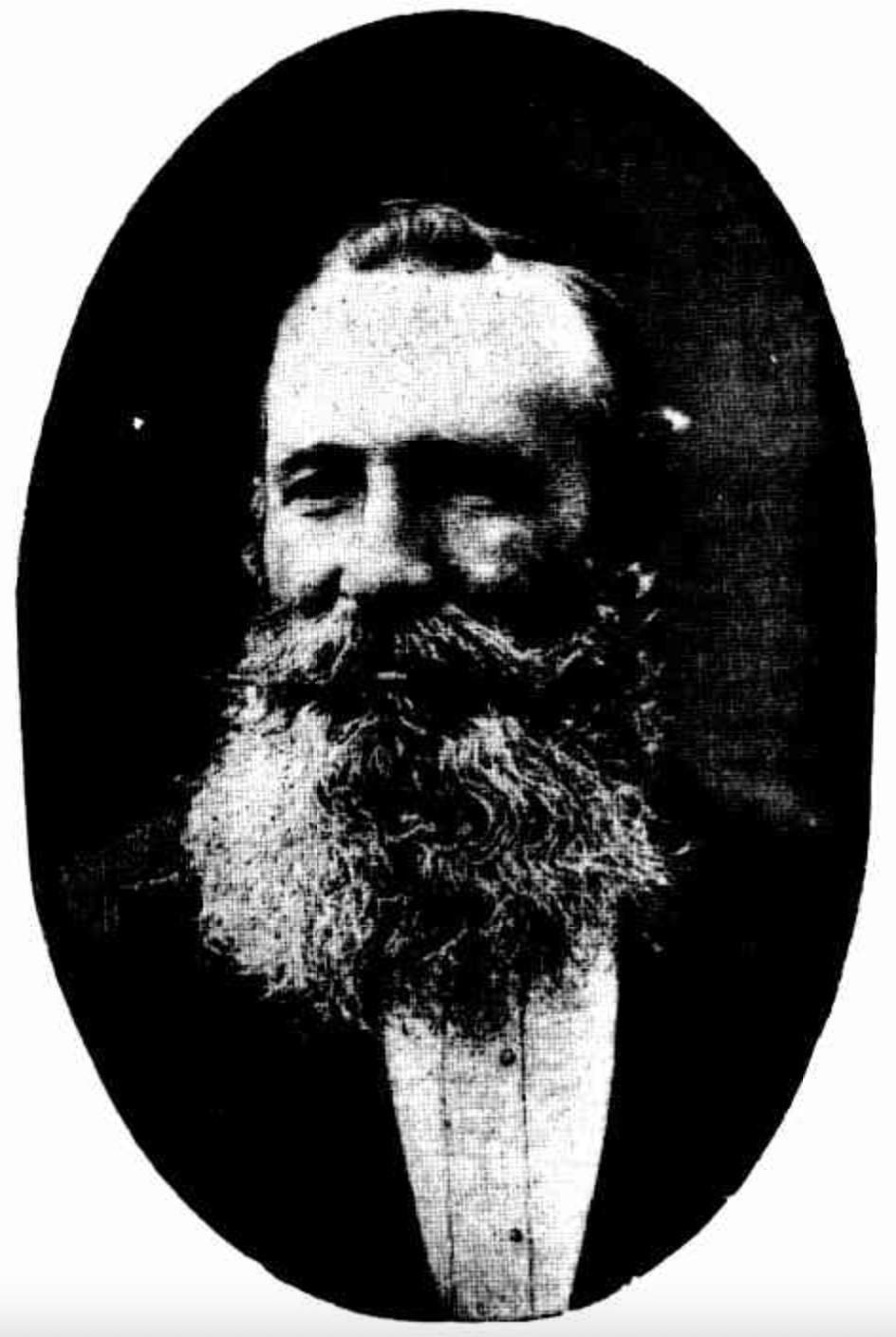
William Alston Hutchinson in 1889

William Alston Hutchinson (26 March 1839 – 20 June 1897) was an English-born Australian politician, manufacturer, merchant and colliery director.

He was born at Garrigill near Cumbria in Cumberland to storekeeper Thomas Hutchinson and Jane Phillipson. He attended Alston Grammar School and migrated to Melbourne in 1857, goldmining at Castlemaine and Ballarat. In 1860, he moved to Newcastle in New South Wales, and in 1861, he married Barbara Telena Steel, with whom he had eight children. He moved to Sydney in 1872, where he became a soap and candle merchant.

He was a Balmain alderman from 1878 and later mayor; he was also an alderman of the Municipality of The Glebe from 1893 until 1897, serving as mayor from 12 February 1894 until February 1896. In 1882, he was elected to the New South Wales Legislative Assembly for Balmain but did not re-contest in 1885. Hutchinson died at Glebe Point in 1897.

Civic offices
Preceded by Albert Elkington	Mayor of Balmain; 1881 – 1883	Succeeded by James Cameron
Preceded by Percy Charles Lucas	Mayor of The Glebe; 1894 – 1896	Succeeded by William Cary
New South Wales Legislative Assembly
Preceded by Jacob Garrard	Member for Balmain; 1882 – 1885; Served alongside: Jacob Garrard	Succeeded by John Hawthorne; Solomon Hyam
