= George Daniel Clark =

Australian politician

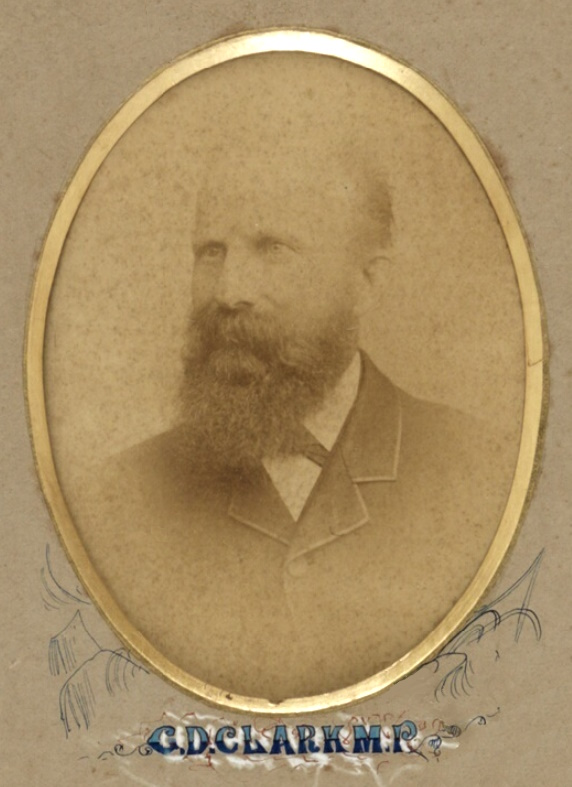

Member for Balmain (NSW Legislative Assembly)
- In office 17 June 1891 – 25 June 1894

Personal details
- Born: 30 July 1848 Greenstead, Colchester, county Essex, England
- Died: 21 February 1933 (aged 84) Lakemba, New South Wales
- Spouse: Rosannah Jane Druce
- Parents: Daniel Clark (father); Mary Ann (née Wallace) (mother)

George Daniel Clark (30 July 1848 – 21 February 1933) was an English-born Australian politician, writer and temperance reformer.

In June 1891 Clark was amongst the initial group of Labor Party members elected to the New South Wales Legislative Assembly. He represented the electorate of Balmain from 1891 to June 1894, initially as a member of the Labor Electoral League but left the party after refusing to sign a pledge requiring solidarity with caucus decisions. He later rejoined the Labor Party and unsuccessfully contested a number of elections as a Labor candidate.

From the early 1870s Clark was a tireless and prominent worker for the temperance cause and steadfast in his advocacy of prohibition. He wrote extensively on the subject and edited an influential temperance journal for thirty-five years. Clark was an influential member of the New South Wales branch of the International Order of Good Templars (IOGT), as well as several other temperance organisations.

== Biography ==
=== Early years ===
George Daniel Clark was born on 30 July 1848 at Greenstead, an outlying parish of Colchester in county Essex, the eldest son of Daniel Clark and Mary Ann (née Wallace), one of eight children in the family. His father was an agricultural labourer receiving a salary of nine to twelve shillings per week.

Young George attended school up to the age of nine, cut short by financial troubles. From the age of ten years he worked as an agricultural labourer.

In about 1864, aged sixteen, Clark worked as a seaman on vessels engaged in the English coasting trade. Later he worked on vessels sailing to foreign ports.

=== New South Wales ===
On April 1871 Clark arrived at Sydney, in the Australian colony of New South Wales. For a period of five years he was employed by the Australasian Steam Navigation Company on vessels operating between ports on the Australian coast. During this period Clark devoted "a good deal of his spare time to study, with the result that he made considerable advancement educationally".

In about 1873 Clark joined the International Order of Good Templars (IOGT), a worldwide temperance organisation advocating total abstinence and the prohibition of alcohol. The IOGT had an organisational structure modeled on Freemasonry, using similar ritual and regalia.

On 27 August 1875 he married Rosannah Jane Druce at Woolloomooloo. The couple raised five children, born from 1876 to 1889.

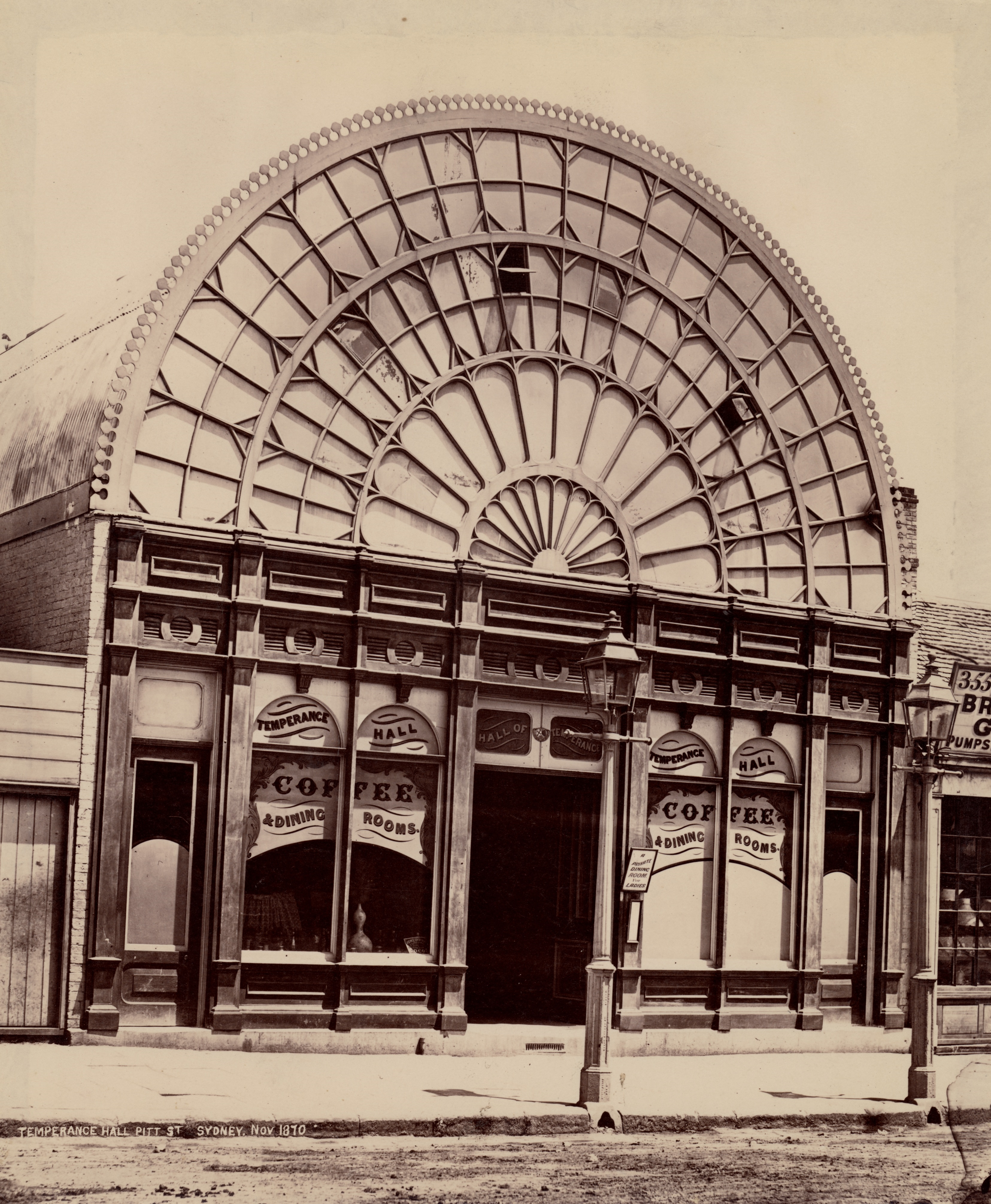
The Temperance Hall in Pitt Street, Sydney, photographed in November 1870.

In about 1876 Clark was employed as a messenger at the Sydney Observatory at Millers Point in Sydney, remaining in that position until about 1882.

In 1883 Clark became editor of the New South Wales Good Templar publication, the official organ of the New South Wales branch of the International Order of Good Templars (IOGT). He continue in that role for thirty-four years (until 1917). In December 1885 Clark, in his role as Grand Electoral Superintendent of Sydney, presided over the establishment of the 'Beacon Light' Lodge (No. 481) of the IOGT in meeting rooms in Crown Street, Sydney. Clark served in the role of electoral superintendent in the Grand Lodge of the New South Wales branch of the IOGT for many years.

In April 1885 it was decided at the annual session of the Grand Lodge to publish the Good Templar fortnightly instead of monthly, "owing to the large increase in the circulation" of the journal. In April 1889 the masthead of the New South Wales Good Templar was changed to Australian Temperance World and Good Templar Record, "with a view of still further increasing the circulation and usefulness" of the publication. The name of the publication became generally shortened to the Australian Temperance World. In August 1889 the journal claimed to have between thirty and forty thousand subscribers and was the official organ not only of the IOGT, but also the Sons Of Temperance, the Local Option League and the Women's Temperance Union. The publication's office was located in the Temperance Hall at 301 Pitt Street, Sydney.^{[A]}

By the mid-1880s Clark was also a member of other temperance organisations, the Independent Order of Rechabites (IOR) and the Local Option League. He was a foundation member of the Local Option League, a temperance lobby group formed in 1883 that campaigned to give voters the power to prohibit or restrict the sale of liquor in their own electorates. Clark delivered a paper, titled 'History of the Temperance Movement in New South Wales', before a meeting of the International Temperance Congress in June 1888 in the Temperance Hall in Sydney. He was also a member of the executive of the New South Wales Alliance for the Suppression of Intemperance.

Clark was a foundation member of the Institute of Journalists of New South Wales, formed in October 1889, an organisation with the object of protecting "the rights and privileges of journalists and to elevate the status of the profession".

=== Political career ===
By 1891 Clark was known "as a champion of the temperance cause, and an uncompromising enemy of the liquor traffic" and a loyal supporter "to the labor platform and party". Although he had never been a trade unionist, having "left the sea before the Seaman's Union was formed", Clark took an active interest in working-class and industrial matters.

The 1891 general election in New South Wales, held in June and early July 1891, saw the first electoral successes of the Labor Party (then known as the Labor Electoral League of New South Wales). The Leichhardt and Balmain branch of the Labor Electoral League nominated four candidates to contest the election for the Balmain electorate, which at that time returned four members to the New South Wales Legislative Assembly. Clark was one of the Labor nominations, together with William Murphy, Edward Darnley and James Johnston. A total of thirteen candidates stood for election for the Balmain electorate, including each of the sitting members, all four of whom represented the Free Trade Party. At the election held on 17 June 1891 all four of the Labor League members were elected to the seat, resulting in the defeat of the sitting members. Clark polled third in the ballot, receiving 2,525 votes (11.1 percent).

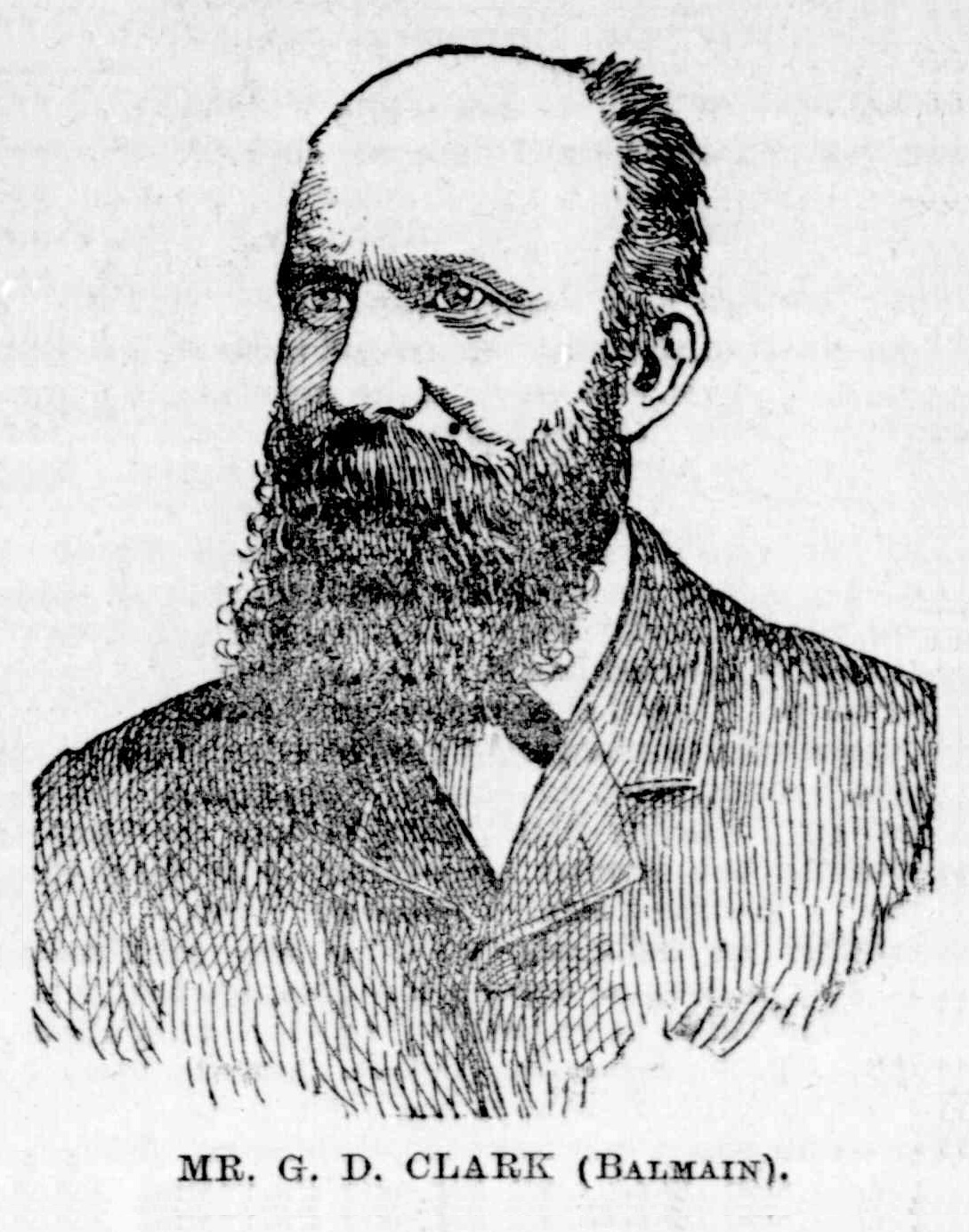
Illustration of George D. Clark, published in Evening News, 3 July 1891.

Clark had a tireless dedication to the temperance cause, writing extensively on the subject, and believed in temperance legislation as a means of social reform. At the first sitting of parliament after his election, Clark gave notice of two motions, one for the prohibition of intoxicating liquor and the other to close the bar in Parliament House. His motion to prohibit alcohol by popular vote came up for debate in September 1891, but was defeated with only nineteen members voting for it.

In parliament Clark was a supporter of the initial Labor caucus pledge affirming that decisions made at caucus meetings would be binding on all parliamentary members, based on the trade union tradition of acceptance of decisions freely made at union meetings. In December 1891 the unity of the Labor party members was tested by a censure motion against the government by George Reid, leader of the Free Trade opposition. There was no unanimity of opinion amongst the Labor Party members on the fiscal issue of free trade versus protectionism, and the debate pitted the concept of party solidarity against members' personal beliefs and their constituents' interests. When the vote on Reid's censure motion was held, all the Labor League members, with the exception of James McGowen, "voted as their fiscal faith guided them", producing a split in the Labor vote. Clark was one of the seventeen, all supporters of free trade except McGowen, who voted for the censure motion. Sixteen of the protectionist Labor members supported the government by voting against the motion, which was defeated.

In September 1893 the Electoral Districts Commissioners presented their scheme of redistribution of seats under the new Electoral Act before the New South Wales Legislative Assembly. As part of the process, multi-member electorates were abolished and the electorates were realigned and in some cases renamed. The Balmain electorate was split into the single-member electorates of Balmain North, Balmain South, Annandale and Leichhardt.

In an article published in Melbourne's Table Talk newspaper, Clark was described as a member of the New South Wales parliament "who devotes so much attention in the House to everything directly and indirectly (however remote) relating to drink and abstinence, that he might be fairly described as 'the honourable member for cold water'".

At the 1894 general election Clark was nominated as the Free Trade Party candidate for the Leichhardt electorate (one of the single-member constituencies split from the Balmain electorate). Clark's former colleague, Edward Darnley, also contested the election as an independent free trade candidate. At the election held on 14 July 1894 it was John Hawthorne, another independent free trade candidate, that topped the poll for the Leichhardt seat. Hawthorne had been one of the sitting members defeated at the 1891 election. He failed to gain pre-selection for the Free Trade Party at the 1894 election and opted to run as an independent candidate. Clark polled third with 372 votes (16.7 percent), well behind Hawthorne and the Labor Electoral League candidate, William Holman.

After his defeat at the 1894 election Clark rejoined the Labor Party and ran as its endorsed candidate in four state elections between 1898 and 1907, in each case without success. At the 1898 general election Clark was the Labor candidate to contest the Leichhardt electorate. The election was held on 17 July 1898, resulting in the sitting member, John Hawthorne (who had rejoined the Free Trade Party), being re-elected. Clark polled third out of three candidates with 478 votes (24.3 percent).

At the 1901 general election Clark was the Labor candidate for the Newtown-St. Peters electorate. At the election held on 3 July 1901 Clark was narrowly defeated by the independent candidate James Fallick, an alderman of St. Peters council who had previously served as mayor. Clark received 770 votes (just twenty votes short of Fallick's total). At the 1904 general election Clark was the Labor candidate for the electorate of Botany. At the election held on 6 August 1904 Clark was defeated in a close contest with the Liberal Reform Party candidate, Rowland Anderson. Clark attracted 2,154 votes (38.8 percent), seventy votes short of Anderson's total.

When the Liberal Reform government led by Joseph Carruthers was swept to power in New South Wales at the August 1904 election, the first in which women were allowed the vote, it owed much of its electoral success to the temperance movement. In August 1905 the government introduced the Liquor (Amendment) Bill, which included local option provisions allowing for the possibility of reductions of publicans' licenses within specific electorates by popular vote. In addition the legislation "expressly refused the granting of monetary compensation to persons deprived of their licenses through the operation of the local option vote". Clark, representing the temperance and morals committee of the Methodist church, criticised the legislation, arguing that "the bill was so hedged about with restrictions that the local option vote was likely to be inoperative", adding: "an ineffective law was worse than no law".^{[B]}

In August 1906 Clark was one of three candidates selected by the executive of the New South Wales Political Labor League to stand for election to the Senate at the forthcoming Federal election. At the election held in December 1906, candidates for the Anti-Socialist Party were elected to all three Senate seats for New South Wales, with the unsuccessful Labor candidates receiving an average of 41 percent of the vote.

At the New South Wales general election in 1907 Clark was selected as the Labor candidate for the electorate of Queanbeyan. The election, held on 10 September 1907, was won for the Liberal Reform Party by the sitting member Granville Ryrie. Clark received 1,941 votes (44.1 percent).

=== The temperance movement ===
Up until World War I the focus of the temperance movement in New South Wales had been advocacy for the introduction of local option legislation and its application, to allow decisions regarding the sale of alcohol within an electorate to be determined by a popular vote. However, the push by temperance campaigners for liquor license cancellations under the 'local option' legislation, and subsequent polls, had met with only moderate success and a general acceptance that prohibition could not be achieved. Delegates at the Australasian Temperance Conference in Adelaide in March 1914 voted to adopt six o'clock closing of hotel bars as official policy, which was also endorsed by the New South Wales Alliance at their annual convention in May 1914. By 1916 the state Labor government led by William Holman had been persuaded to hold a referendum to decide the closing time of public houses in New South Wales. The referendum, held in June 1916, resulted in an overwhelming vote in favour of closing hotels at six o'clock in the afternoon, a result that had been advocated by the temperance movement. Despite what was perceived as a victory and an important social reform by the wider temperance movement, George Clark remained a staunch advocate for prohibition.^{[C]}

By the early 1920s the state alliance of temperance groups began calling themselves the New South Wales Prohibition Alliance, with the explicit intention of building on the success of the early closing vote by reaching the ultimate objective of prohibition.

In December 1923 the Minister for Justice in the second Fuller ministry, Thomas J. Ley, introduced the Liquor Amendment Bill into the New South Wales Legislative Assembly that held the promise of a referendum to test the popular vote for the prohibition of alcohol in the state. During the debate within the temperance movement regarding the legislation, Clark was a prominent voice in the IOGT's opposition to provisions in the legislation to compensate the liquor trade, describing the proposal as "the payment of public money by way of compensation to a traffic which by its crimes against society has forfeited all right to exist". At the annual conference of the IOGT in April 1926 a motion was carried to lodge appeals to the New South Wales parliament to pass a law for a referendum on prohibition, "free from compensation, the result of such referendum to be determined by a majority of the votes cast".

The temperance movement received a set-back in 1927 when the Lang Labor government passed legislation which permitted the sale of liquor with meals on licensed premises, a measure supported by the Nationalist Party opposition led by Thomas Bavin.

Despite the objections led by Clark and the IOGT, the New South Wales Prohibition Alliance accepted that compensation for cancelled licenses was a political reality and approved the provisions of the referendum finally held in September 1928 by the Bavin government. By then public interest in the issue had considerably waned and much of the newspaper coverage highlighted the potential financial burden of compensation if the referendum was carried. In the end the vote resulted in a comprehensive rejection of prohibition. Throughout the campaign Clark had been a stalwart proponent of prohibition but was critical of the Alliance's acceptance of the need for compensation to the liquor trade. In a letter to The Methodist newspaper after the defeat of the prohibition referendum, Clark asserted that the "acceptance of the compensation issue" was "a great tactical mistake". He maintained that the "most important lesson of the poll is the urgent need of an intensive and State-wide pledge-signing campaign, and sound education in regard to the nature of alcohol, and its effects upon the human system". Clark concluded by declaring his belief that "New South Wales and Australia will get prohibition in time, and it will come all the sooner if we are prepared to apply ourselves more devotedly to the work of getting the people ready for it".

In October 1828 Clark published The Good Templar Movement: Its History and Work: A World View of the Liquor Problem, described as a "handbook for temperance workers".

=== Last years ===
Clark was a prominent member of the Methodist Church and served as a lay preacher. He was a member of the Methodist Conference's social questions committee from the early 1890s. During the later years of his life, he was a prominent member of the Methodist church at Lakemba.

In 1932 Clark was made a patriarch of the International Order of Good Templars.

By about February 1932 Clark's health had deteriorated. He was described as being "seriously ill", his daily existence "clouded by pain and weakness".

Towards the end of his life, Clark was living at 'Maldron', at 70 Taylor Street in Lakemba. George Daniel Clark died at Lakemba on 21 February 1933 (aged 84).

== Publications ==
- G. D. Clark (1928), The Good Templar Movement: Its History and Work: A World View of the Liquor Problem, Sydney: Grand Lodge of New South Wales of The International Order of Good Templars.

== See also ==
- Members of the New South Wales Legislative Assembly
- 1891–1894
- Results of New South Wales state elections
- 1891 (Balmain)
- 1894 (Leichhardt)
- 1898 (Leichhardt)
- 1901 (Newtown-St Peters)
- 1904 (Botany)
- 1907 (Queanbeyan)

== Notes ==
A.In the biography of George Daniel Clark by J. D. Bollen (published in the Australian Dictionary of Biography) it is stated that the name of the New South Wales Good Templar publication was changed to Australian Temperance World in 1896. However this is factually incorrect. The name change was approved in April 1889 at the annual session of the Grand Lodge of the Independent Order of Good Templars, changing the masthead from New South Wales Good Templar to Australian Temperance World and Good Templar Record. There are numerous newspaper references to the shortened name of Australian Temperance World in the period from 1889 to 1896.

B.The first local option poll, held concurrently with the September 1907 state election in New South Wales, resulted in a reduction of licenses in sixty-five of the ninety state electorates (resulting in 296 publicans' licenses being terminated). At the following 1910 general election, however, reductions were carried in only fourteen electorates, with only a further twenty-eight licenses being cancelled, a result impacted by defensive campaigning by the Liquor Trades Defence Union of New South Wales (representing brewers and wine growers, wine and spirit merchants and licensed victuallers). At the next local option poll, concurrent with the 1913 election, reductions were carried in fifteen electorates, with only twenty-three licenses being cancelled. The three local option polls resulted in 344 hotels being closed in New South Wales, just eleven percent of the total licenses, and no electorate voted for prohibition. The fourth local option poll, due to be taken at the 1917 election, was suspended and in 1923 local option polling under the 1905 legislation was abolished. In 1930, reflecting on the history of the temperance movement in New South Wales, George Clark stated that he held "definitely to the opinion that [from 1905] the swing... to political action was unwise".

C.The result of the June 1916 referendum was influenced by a riot of drunken soldiers that had occurred in Sydney in February 1916. Trainee troops, disgruntled by conditions at the Casula military training camp, marched from the camp and engaged in a drunken spree in hotels in Liverpool, before commandeering trains for Sydney where the rioters damaged property and looted shops and hotels. Armed military guards and police reinforcements were deployed to subdue the drunken soldiers. In one incident at Central Railway Station one soldier was killed and eight others were seriously injured. In the aftermath about a thousand soldiers were court-martialled and either gaoled or discharged from the army.

New South Wales Legislative Assembly
Preceded by Jacob Garrard; Frank Smith; John Hawthorne; George Clubb	Member for Balmain; 1891–1894; With: Edward Darnley; James Johnston; William Murphy	District abolished
