= Alfred de Lissa =

Alfred de Lissa (1838 – 25 February 1913) was an English-born Australian solicitor and legal scholar.

He was born in London to Jewish parents Solomon Aaron de Lissa and Rosetta Solomon. He attended University College London and in 1854 migrated to Sydney, where his father's upholstery business led to bankruptcy. Alfred became a solicitor in 1866, specialising in trademark and company law. In 1881 he published Bankruptcy and Insolvency Law, which was followed by Companies' Work and Mining Law in New South Wales and Victoria (1894), The Codification of Mercantile Law (1897) and The Bill of Lading Question and Marine Insurance Policies (1901). He also published pamphlets advocating reform on a range of financial and legal matters.

De Lissa had married Elizabeth Hart in 1873; they had three children. He visited England in 1887, having unsuccessfully proposed to Sir Henry Parkes a finance company to draw English investment to Australia. Politically he was a Protectionist, running for the seat of Patrick's Plains at the 1891 colonial election. De Lissa retired in 1912 and died the following year.
