= John Hawthorne (politician) =

Australian politician

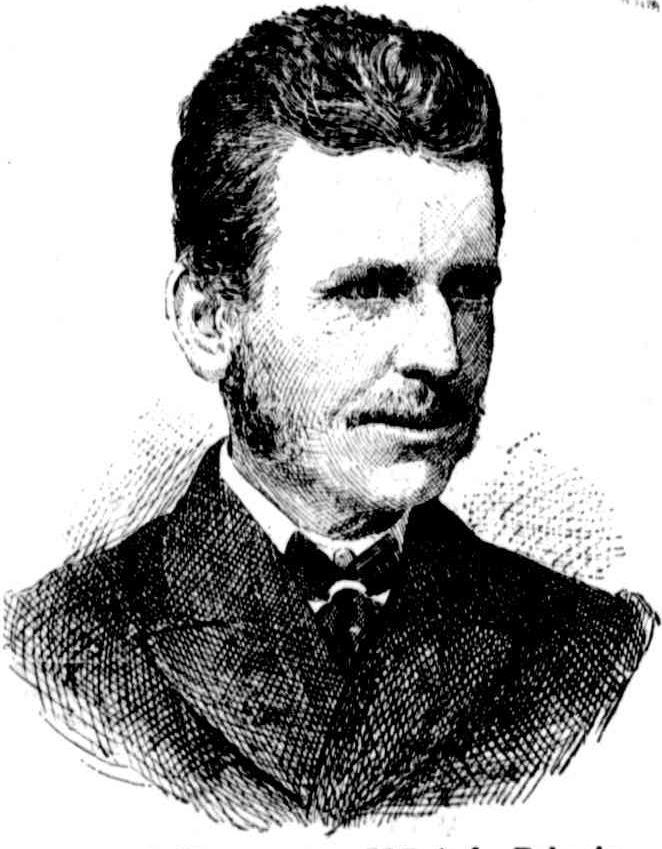

John Stuart Hawthorne (14 February 1848 – 30 July 1942) was an Australian politician.

== Early life ==
Born in Sydney to James Hawthorne and Jane Elkins, he attended Cleveland Street Public School before working with a softgoods firm, establishing his own business in 1875. In that year he married Mary Emily Meyn at Singleton, with whom he had nine children. In 1884 he was bankrupted; he was discharged in 1885, becoming an auctioneer and estate agent at Leichhardt.

== Political career ==
In 1885 he was elected to the New South Wales Legislative Assembly as one of the members for Balmain, serving until 1891, joining the Free Trade Party on the emergence of political parties in 1887. He was bankrupted again in 1890, but retained the seat unopposed at the resulting by-election. He was discharged from bankruptcy in 1891.

Multi-member constituencies were abolished in 1894 and Balmain was split into Balmain North, Balmain South, Annandale and Leichhardt. In 1894 he was not the selected Free Trade candidate for Leichhardt, but stood as an independent and was returned to the Assembly. He re-joined the Free Trade Party and the Liberal Reform Party on its formation in 1901. In 1904 he was denied Liberal Reform pre-selection in favour of Robert Booth, who had the support of the United Protestant Defence Association due to Hawthorne voting to grant money to various charities which included a Catholic orphanage. He again stood as an independent, but was defeated by Booth with a margin of 390 votes (6.4%). He stood again as an independent in 1907 but finished last of three candidates. He was the Free Trade whip during the fifth Parkes government and the Reid government, but did not hold ministerial or parliamentary office.

== Legacy ==
The Hawthorne Canal, which he agitated for in parliament in 1890, is named after John Stuart Hawthorne. In turn, the Hawthorne Canal Reserve, Hawthorne Parade and a stop on the Inner West Light Rail bear his surname.

== Later life and death ==
Hawthorne died at Summer Hill on 30 July 1942 (aged 94).

== See also ==
- Members of the New South Wales Legislative Assembly
- 1885–1887
- 1887–1889
- 1889–1891
- 1894–1895
- 1895–1898
- 1898–1901
- 1901–1904
- Results of New South Wales state elections
- 1885 (Balmain)
- 1887 (Balmain)
- 1889 (Balmain)
- 1890 (Balmain by)
- 1891 (Balmain)
- 1894 (Leichhardt)
- 1895 (Leichhardt)
- 1898 (Leichhardt)
- 1901 (Leichhardt)
- 1904 (Leichhardt)
- 1907 (Leichhardt)

New South Wales Legislative Assembly
| Preceded by Jacob Garrard; William Hutchinson | Member for Balmain; 1885 – 1891; With: Jacob Garrard; Solomon Hyam / Frank Smith none / George Clubb | Succeeded by George Clark; Edward Darnley; James Johnston; William Murphy |
| New district | Member for Leichhardt; 1894 – 1904 | Succeeded by Robert Booth |
