= Jacob Garrard =

Australian politician

The Honourable Jacob Garrard
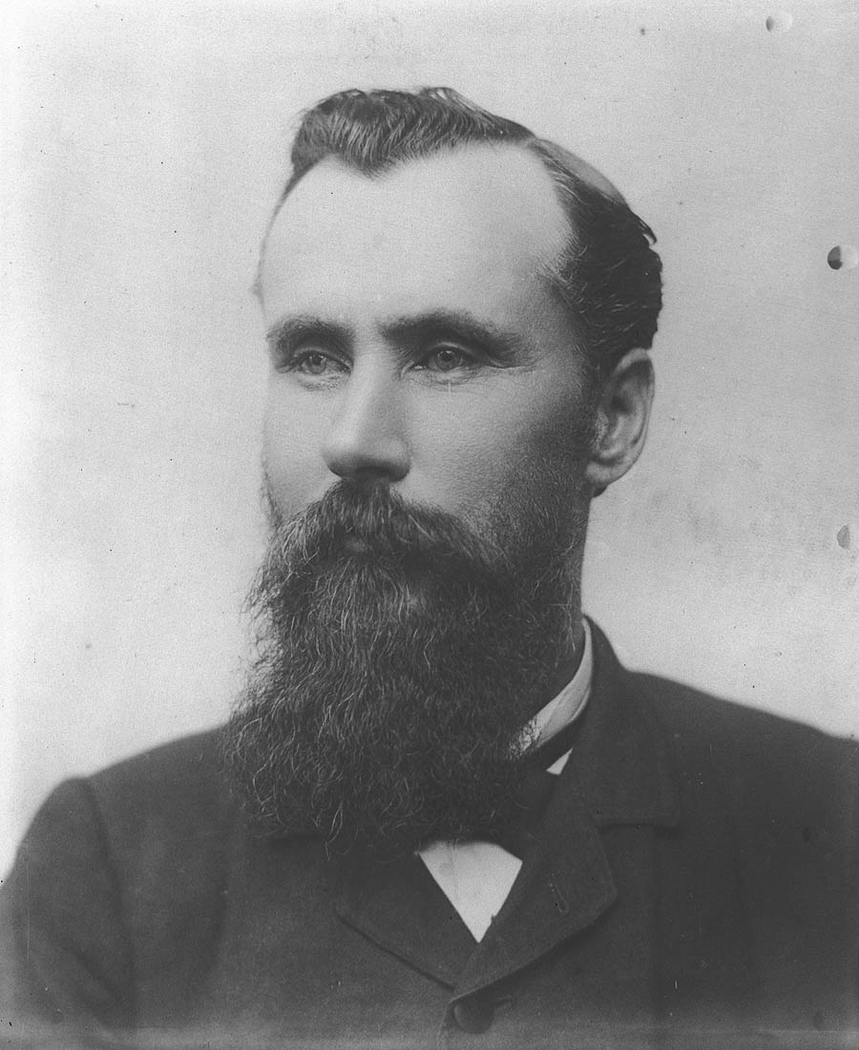

Secretary of Public Works
- In office 22 December 1885 – 25 February 1886
- Premier: Sir John Robertson
- Preceded by: William Lyne
- Succeeded by: William Lyne

Personal details
- Born: 1 January 1846 Harwich, Essex, England
- Died: 5 November 1931 (aged 85) Hornsby, New South Wales, Australia
- Party: Free Trade Party

Jacob Garrard (1 January 1846 – 5 November 1931) was a politician in colonial New South Wales, serving as Secretary for Public Works and Minister of Public Instruction.

== Early life ==
Garrard was born in Harwich, Essex, England, the son of Joseph Garrard, a revenue officer, and his wife Martha, née Piggott. Educated at Harwich National School and Southwark Borough School, Garrard migrated at 13 years of age with his family to New Zealand where he worked on coastal ships. Garrard moved in 1867 to Sydney, New South Wales and lived at Balmain and until around 1883.

== Political career ==
Garrard represented Balmain in the New South Wales Legislative Assembly from 19 November 1880 to 6 June 1891, and was returned at the head of the poll at the general election in 1889. He was defeated at the 1891 election for Balmain with Labour picking up all 4 seats. He returned to the Legislative Assembly as one of the members for Central Cumberland at the by-election on 29 August 1891 following the death of Robert Ritchie, serving until 25 June 1894 when multi-member districts were abolished. 76 new districts were created, and Garrard successfully contested Sherbrooke which largely consisted of the north western part of Central Cumberland, including Blacktown and Baulkham Hills. He held the seat in 1895 but was defeated at the 1898 election.

He was Secretary for Public Works in the last Robertson Ministry from December 1885 to February 1886. He was Minister of Public Instruction in the Reid ministry from 3 August 1894 until 15 August 1898, adding the additional portfolio of Minister for Labour and Industry from 11 March 1895.

== Later life and death ==
He was appointed to the Metropolitan Board of Water Supply and Sewerage in 1899, serving until 1912, including a period as president from 1899 until 1904.

Garrard died in Hornsby, Sydney, Australia on 5 November 1931, survived by two daughters and two of his five sons. He was buried in the Methodist section of Gore Hill Cemetery.

New South Wales Legislative Assembly
New district	Member for Balmain; 1880–1891; With: none/Hutchinson/Hyam/Smith none/Hawthorne none/Clubb	Succeeded by George Clark; Edward Darnley; James Johnston; William Murphy
Preceded by Robert Ritchie	Member for Central Cumberland; 1891–1894; With: John Nobbs/George McCredie; Frank Farnell; David Dale	District abolished
New district	Member for Sherbrooke; 1894–1898	Succeeded by Broughton O'Conor
Political offices
Preceded by William Lyne	Secretary for Public Works; 1885–1886	Succeeded by William Lyne
Preceded by Francis Suttor	Minister of Public Instruction; 1894–1898	Succeeded by James Hogue
New office	Minister for Labour and Industry; 1895–1898	Succeeded by James Hogue
Civic offices
Preceded by James Cameron	Mayor of Balmain; 1885–1886	Succeeded by John Greenway Punch
Government offices
Preceded by Thomas Rowe	President of the Metropolitan Board of Water Supply and Sewerage; 1899 – 1904	Succeeded by Thomas Keele
