= Solomon Hyam =

Australian politician

Solomon Herbert Hyam (16 May 1837 – 7 November 1901) was an Australian politician.

He was born at Sarah's Valley near Jamberoo to landowner and innkeeper Michael Hyam and Charlotte Rebecca Broughton. He was home schooled and became a commercial agent in Sydney, where he was bankrupted in 1860 and joined his father's law business. In 1866 he returned to commerce, and from 1874 was a produce merchant. In 1861 he married Sarah Priestley, with whom he had six children. A Balmain alderman from 1874 to 1879, he was mayor from 1876 to 1879. He was elected to the New South Wales Legislative Assembly for Balmain in 1885, but lost his seat in 1887. In 1892 he was appointed to the New South Wales Legislative Council, where he remained until his death at Katoomba in 1901.

Civic offices
Preceded by Henry Perdriau	Mayor of Balmain; 1876 – 1879	Succeeded by John Taylor
New South Wales Legislative Assembly
Preceded by William Hutchinson	Member for Balmain; 1885–1887; Served alongside: Jacob Garrard, John Hawthorne	Succeeded by Frank Smith
