= Frank Smith (New South Wales politician) =

Politician from New South Wales, Australia

Frank James Smith
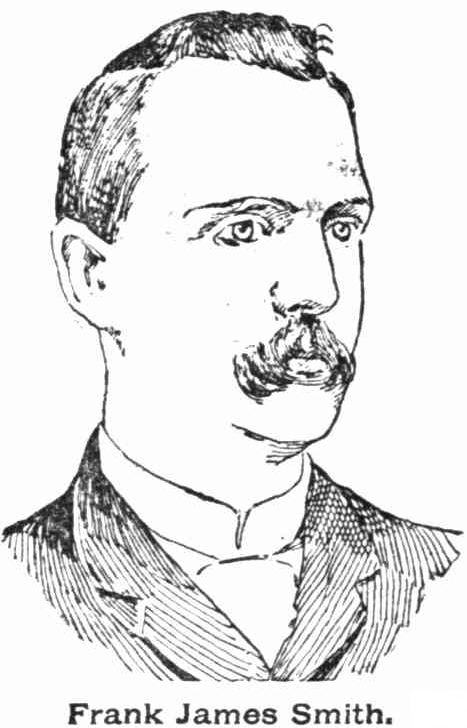

Member of the New South Wales Parliament for Balmain
- In office 5 Feb 1887 – 6 June 1891

Personal details
- Born: 1852 England
- Died: 4 January 1910 (aged 57–58) Woolwich
- Party: Free Trade
- Spouse(s): Sarah Thursdon (married c 1872)
- Children: 1 daughter
- Parent(s): Sarah Leicester; Lewis Francis Smith

Frank James Smith (1852 – 4 January 1910) was an English-born Australian politician.

== Early life ==
His parents were land speculator Lewis Francis Smith and Sarah Leicester. He arrived in Victoria around 1867, and then spent some time in Hobart. He worked as a printer's apprentice in Victoria and then moved to Balmain in Sydney around 1877. He trained as a solicitor, however he never practised. Around 1872 he married Sarah Thursdon, with whom he had a daughter.

== Political career ==
In 1887 he was elected to the New South Wales Legislative Assembly as a Free Trade member for Balmain. He was re-elected in 1889, but was defeated in 1891.

== Criminal conviction ==
Smith was the managing director of the Australian Mercantile Loan and Guarantee Company from September 1889 until September 1890, and the company was placed into liquidation on 11 September 1891. In February 1892 he was convicted of conspiracy to fraudulently misrepresent the financial affairs of the company, and was sentenced to imprisonment for 7 years. Peter Howe, another member of the Legislative Assembly, was also a director of the company. In 1891 Howe had been convicted of conspiracy to defraud the company and was also sentenced to imprisonment for 7 years.

Smith was released from prison in June 1895 after serving 3 years.

== Later life ==
He attempted to return to politics, standing as an independent Free Trade candidate at the July 1895 election for Balmain North, but polled just 32 votes.

Smith died at Woolwich on 4 January 1910 (aged 57–58).

New South Wales Legislative Assembly
Preceded by Jacob Garrard; John Hawthorne; Solomon Hyam	Member for Balmain; 1887–1891; With: Jacob Garrard; John Hawthorne none / George Clubb	Succeeded by George Clark; Edward Darnley; James Johnston; William Murphy
