= George Clubb =

Australian politician

George Clubb (2 June 1846 – 29 March 1924) was a Scottish-born Australian politician.

Born at Fochabers in Morayshire to builder John Clubb and Ann Newlands, his family moved to Sydney around 1851. He was educated at Pyrmont and became apprentice to his father in the building trade. He lived in Balmain as a builder from 1870, and in the 1880s established himself as a real estate agent in Rozelle. He married Ida Keynott in 1880; they had nine children. He was a Balmain alderman 1881-96 and 1911–22, and was elected mayor twice: for an annual term in 1890-91 and a biennial term in 1912-14. In 1889 he was elected to the New South Wales Legislative Assembly as a Free Trade member for Balmain, but he was defeated in 1891. He continued to work as an estate agent and auctioneer until his retirement in 1923. He died at Drummoyne in 1924.

New South Wales Legislative Assembly
Preceded by Jacob Garrard; John Hawthorne; Frank Smith	Member for Balmain; 1889 – 1891; Served alongside: Garrard, Hawthorne, Smith	Succeeded by George Clark; Edward Darnley; James Johnston; William Murphy
Civic offices
Preceded by James McDonald (acting)	Mayor of Balmain; 1890 – 1891	Succeeded by James Brodie
Preceded by Matthew Henry Cohen	Mayor of Balmain; 1912 – 1914	Succeeded by Henry Swan
