= Edward Darnley =

Australian politician

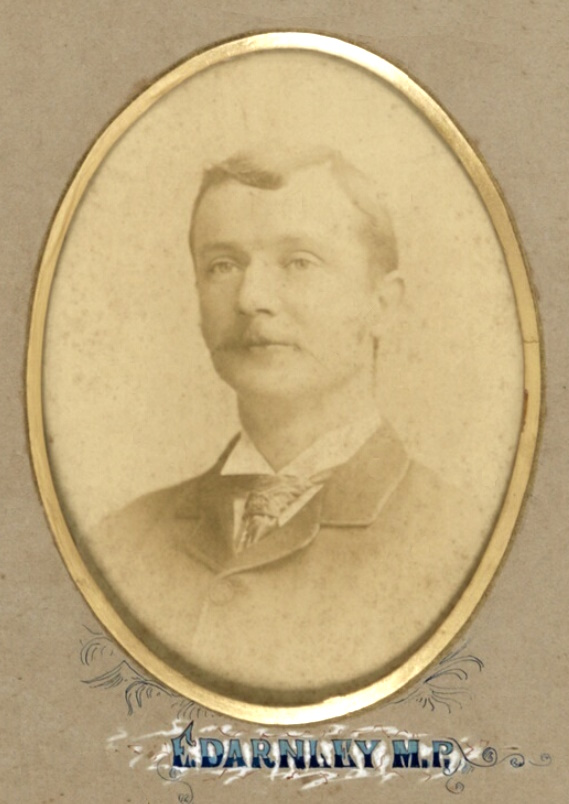

Member for Balmain (NSW Legislative Assembly)
- In office 17 June 1891 – 25 June 1894

Personal details
- Born: 29 January 1859 Birmingham, England
- Died: 25 June 1927 (aged 68) Leichhardt, New South Wales
- Spouse: Eliza Ann Wild
- Parents: Edward Darnley (father); Hannah (née Worrall) (mother)

Edward Darnley (29 January 1859 – 25 June 1927) was an English-born Australian trade union official and politician.

Darnley was a plasterer by trade and from an early age was prominently involved in union administration and activities. In June 1891 he was amongst the initial group of Labor Party members elected to the New South Wales Legislative Assembly. Darnley represented the electorate of Balmain from 1891 to June 1894, initially as a member of the Labor Electoral League but left the party after refusing to sign a pledge requiring solidarity with caucus decisions. He later rejoined the Labor Party.

== Biography ==
=== Early years ===
Edward Darnley was born on 29 January 1859 in Birmingham, England, the youngest son of Edward Darnley and Hannah (née Worrall). His father was a plasterer and later a building contractor.

Darnley's education "was not very advanced". He left school at the age of eleven and found work as an errand boy. Later he was employed in a jeweller's establishment, where he remained for four years.

His older brother, Samuel Darnley, emigrated to Queensland aboard the Toowoomba which arrived at the port of Rockhampton in November 1874. Samuel was a plasterer by trade and was living in Sydney by 1876.^{[A]}

=== Plasterer ===
By the late 1870s Edward Darnley began working as a plasterer in Birmingham. In 1879, aged twenty, he joined the National Association of Operative Plasterers, beginning a long and prominent association with unionism.

Darnley served as president of the plasterers' union in the Birmingham district.

=== New South Wales ===
Darnley emigrated to New South Wales as an unassisted migrant aboard the R.M.S. Austral, arriving at Sydney in early 2 January 1885. He joined the Sydney United Plasterers' Society soon after his arrival.^{[B]}

In October 1885, at the annual demonstration in Sydney in connection with the eight-hour movement, Darnley was a delegate representing the Plasterers' Society in organising the event. In the procession the banner of the Plasterers' Society was described as blue, bordered by red, with an image of "a large unfinished building ready for plastering, supported by emblems of the craft". On the reverse side of the banner was a representation of Captain Cook's statue.

Edward Darnley and Eliza Ann Wild were married on 2 December 1885 in Sydney. The couple had nine children, three sons and six daughters, born from 1887 to 1900.

By December 1885 'Ted' Darnley was serving as president of the Plasterers' Society, a position he held for several terms. He later held the position of secretary of the union, serving in that role for about four years. He represented the Society at the congress of trade unions at Sydney in 1885 and at Brisbane in 1888. He served as delegate to the Building Trades Council and on several occasions was a member of the Eight-hour Committee.

In about March 1889 members of the Plasterers' Society went on strike after negotiations stalled with the employers' body, the Master Plasterers' Association, over the issue of establishing a minimum basic wage. Darnley was prominent in bargaining with the employers which, after a strike lasting about four weeks, achieved the objective sought by the union of a minimum basic wage of eleven shillings per day.

In 1891 Darnley was the representative of the Plasterers' Society on the Sydney Trades and Labor Council.

=== Political career ===
The 1891 general election in New South Wales, held in June and early July 1891, saw the first electoral successes of the Labor Party (then known as the Labor Electoral League of New South Wales). The Leichhardt and Balmain branch of the Labor Electoral League nominated four candidates to contest the election for the Balmain electorate, which at that time returned four members to the New South Wales Legislative Assembly. Darnley was one of the Labor nominations, together with William Murphy, George Clark and James Johnston. A total of thirteen candidates stood for election for the Balmain electorate, including each of the sitting members, all four of whom represented the Free Trade Party. At the election held on 17 June 1891 all four of the Labor League members were elected to the seat, resulting in the defeat of the sitting members. Darnley's three Labor colleagues polled highest, with Darnley running a close fourth, having received 2,518 votes (11.1 percent).

In parliament Darnley was a supporter of the initial Labor caucus pledge affirming that decisions made at caucus meetings would be binding on all parliamentary members, based on the trade union tradition of acceptance of decisions freely made at union meetings. In December 1891 the unity of the Labor party members was tested by a censure motion against the government by George Reid, leader of the Free Trade opposition. There was no unanimity of opinion amongst the Labor Party members on the fiscal issue of free trade versus protectionism, and the debate pitted the concept of party solidarity against members' personal beliefs and their constituents' interests. When the vote on Reid's censure motion was held, all the Labor League members, with the exception of James McGowen, "voted as their fiscal faith guided them", producing a split in the Labor vote. Darnley was one of the seventeen, all supporters of free trade except McGowen, who voted for the censure motion. Sixteen of the protectionist Labor members supported the government by voting against the motion, which was defeated. After subsequent efforts were made to amend the pledge to bind Labor League parliamentarians to a unified fiscal position as determined by caucus, Darnley refused to sign. He later justified his refusal to sign the "iron-clad pledge", asserting "that the question of free-trade or protection was of no importance to the workers... [and] the best way to sink it was to leave it off the platform, and allow each man to use his vote as his conscience dictated".

In September 1893 the Electoral Districts Commissioners presented their scheme of redistribution of seats under the new Electoral Act before the New South Wales Legislative Assembly. As part of the process, multi-member electorates were abolished and the electorates were realigned and in some cases renamed. The Balmain electorate was split into the single-member electorates of Balmain North, Balmain South, Annandale and Leichhardt.

At the 1894 general election Darnley was nominated as a candidate for the Leichhardt electorate (one of the single-member constituencies split from the Balmain electorate). In mid-June 1894, at a meeting at the Royal Hotel in Leichhardt, it was agreed to form a committee to support his candidature. Darnley advised those assembled that "he would be a candidate in the interest of freetrade and labor, though he would not sign any pledges". Darnley contested the election as one of four independent candidates, in his case as a free trade supporter. The major parliamentary factions, the Free Trade Party, the Protectionist Party and the Labor Electoral League, each ran a candidate, with Darnley's former colleague, George Clark, as the Free Trade Party candidate. At the election held on 14 July 1894 it was John Hawthorne, another independent free trade candidate, that topped the poll for the Leichhardt seat. Hawthorne had been one of the sitting members defeated at the 1891 election. He failed to gain pre-selection for the Free Trade Party at the 1894 election and opted to run as an independent free trade candidate. At the election Darnley attracted only 34 votes.

=== Later years ===
Darnley remained a loyal trade unionist throughout his life and by the early 1900s had returned to the Labor party. He served as a member of the Eight-hour Committee from 1902 to 1912.

In mid-August 1906 Darnley was one of four nominations for pre-selection for the Labor Party to contest the Federal seat of Cook at the forthcoming general election. He was unsuccessful in the ballot held a week later, losing to James H. Catts who was elected as the member for Cook at the election in December 1906.

Edward Darnley died on 25 June 1927 at his residence in Flood Street, Leichhardt, aged 68. He was buried in Waverley cemetery. In his obituary published in The Labor Daily Darnley was described as "a good unionist and Labor supporter".

== Notes ==
A.Samuel Darnley was born on 29 July 1854 at Birmingham. He married Letitia Henry on 28 September 1876 in Sydney. Samuel Darnley died on 2 February 1915 at Leichhardt.

B.The Sydney United Plasterers' Society was also known as the Sydney Operative Plasterers' Society and, from about 1911, as the New South Wales Operative Plasterers' Association.

New South Wales Legislative Assembly
Preceded by George Clubb; Jacob Garrard; John Hawthorne; Frank Smith	Member for Balmain; 1891–1894; Served alongside: George Clark, James Johnston, William Murphy	Abolished
