= James Johnston (New South Wales politician) =

Australian politician

James Johnston (1854 – 31 December 1930) was an English-born Australian politician.

He was born in Liverpool to labourer Andrew Johnston and Anna Patterson. The family moved to Sydney in 1857 and he attended Balmain State School. After leaving school he was apprentice to a boilermaker, eventually becoming a journeying boilermaker himself. On 22 September 1877 he married Sarah Fuller, with whom he had eight children. A committed trade unionist, he helped to form the Boilermakers' Society and the Queensland branch of the Federated Seamen's Movement. On returning to Sydney he became president of the Boilermakers' Society. In 1891 he was elected to the New South Wales Legislative Assembly for Balmain, representing the newly formed Labor Party. On refusing to sign the pledge, he became a Protectionist, but he was defeated in 1894. Johnston died in Sydney in 1930.

New South Wales Legislative Assembly
Preceded by George Clubb; Jacob Garrard; John Hawthorne; Frank Smith	Member for Balmain; 1891–1894; Served alongside: Clark, Darnley, Murphy	Abolished
