= William Murphy (Australian politician) =

Australian politician

William Alfred Murphy (1 March 1858 – 11 October 1929) was an English-born Australian politician.

He was born in Liverpool, England and was educated there and in Montreal, Quebec, Canada. He worked for a Boston-based firm before going to sea and arriving in Sydney, Australia in 1879. He returned for a period to England, but was soon a key figure in the New South Wales labour movement. In 1891 he was elected to the New South Wales Legislative Assembly for Balmain representing the new Labor Party, but disputes over the pledge led to him contesting the 1894 election as a Protectionist unsuccessfully.

Murphy moved to Fremantle in Western Australia around the time of the conclusion of his New South Wales parliamentary term. He worked for the Customs Department for eight years before going into business as a customs agent. He was Mayor of Fremantle from 1907 to 1909, and was a member of the Western Australian Legislative Assembly from 1910 to 1911, representing the electorate of Fremantle.

He died in his house in Hampton Road, Fremantle in 1929 and was buried at Fremantle Cemetery.

New South Wales Legislative Assembly
Preceded by George Clubb; Jacob Garrard; John Hawthorne; Frank Smith	Member for Balmain; 1891–1894; Served alongside: Clark, Darnley, Johnston	Abolished
Western Australian Legislative Assembly
Preceded by James Price	Member for Fremantle; 1910–1911	Succeeded by William Carpenter
