= 1891 New South Wales colonial election =

Colonial election for New South Wales, Australia in 1891

- 17 June 1891 – 3 July 1891

All 141 seats in the New South Wales Legislative Assembly 71 Assembly seats were needed for a majority
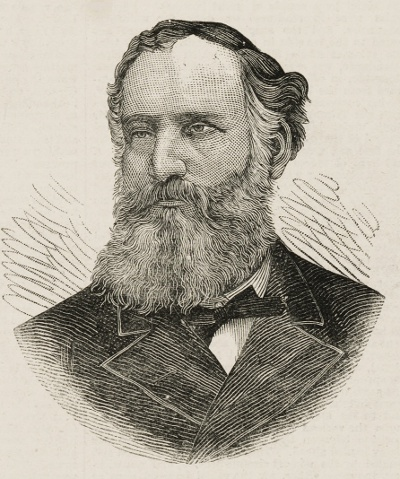

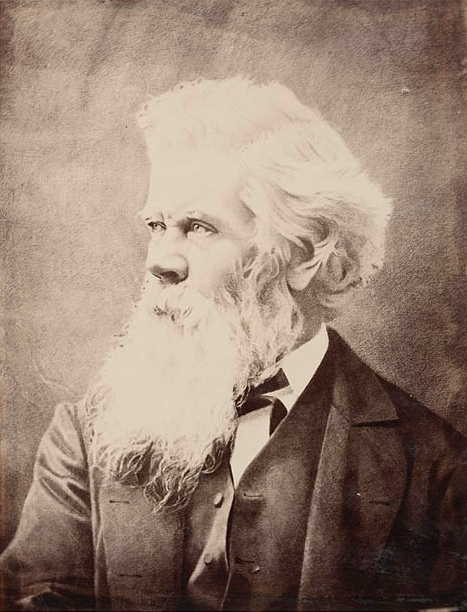
	First party	Second party	Third party
			LEL
Leader	George Dibbs	Sir Henry Parkes	Collective leadership (Note: Labor was led by the Steering Committee of 5, composed of George Black, Joseph Cook, Jack FitzGerald, Thomas Houghton and William Sharp.)
Party	Protectionist	Free Trade	Labour Elec. League
Leader since	17 January 1889	1886	July 1891
Leader's seat	Murrumbidgee	St Leonards
Last election	66 seats	71 seats	First election
Seats won	52 seats	44 seats	35 seats
Seat change	▼14	▼27	▲35
Percentage	36.50%	36.49%	20.62%
Swing	▼14.87	▼12.14	▲20.62
- Results of the election, showing winners in each seat. Seats without circles indicate the electorate returned one member.
Premier before election
Sir Henry Parkes
Free Trade
Elected Premier
Sir Henry Parkes
Free Trade

The 1891 New South Wales colonial election was held in the then colony of New South Wales between 17 June to 3 July 1891. This election was for all of the 141 seats in the New South Wales Legislative Assembly and it was conducted in 35 single-member constituencies, twenty 2-member constituencies, ten 3-member constituencies and nine 4-member constituencies, all with a first past the post system. Part 1 (section 10) of the Electoral Act of 1880 set the qualification for election on "every male subject of Her Majesty of the full age of twenty-one years and absolutely free being a natural born or naturalized subject". Seven seats were uncontested. The previous parliament of New South Wales was dissolved on 6 June 1891 by the Governor, The Earl of Jersey, on the advice of the Premier, Sir Henry Parkes.

The election saw the first appearance of the Labor Party (then known as the Labour Electoral League of New South Wales), which won 35 seats, taking a significant number of votes and seats from both of the previous two major parties in the Assembly, and giving Labour the balance of power. The main political parties in New South Wales, the Protectionist Party and the Free Trade Party both lost seats to Labour. Parkes held on as Premier until October 1891 when he again lost a vote in the Legislative Assembly, causing Parkes to resign as Premier and leader of the Free Trade Party. George Dibbs (Protectionist) became Premier after he arranged for support for his government from Labour.

== Key dates ==
Date	Event
6 June 1891	The Legislative Assembly was dissolved, and writs were issued by the Governor to proceed with an election.
15 to 24 June 1891	Nominations for candidates for the election closed.
17 June to 3 July 1891	Polling days.
14 July 1891	Opening of new Parliament.

== Results ==
The Legislative Assembly after the election.

New South Wales colonial election, 3 July 1891 Legislative Assembly << 1889–1894 >>
Enrolled voters					
Votes cast	180,449		Turnout	64.40	+4.87
Informal votes	3,680		Informal	2.00	+0.28
Summary of votes by party
Party	Primary votes	%	Swing	Seats	Change
Protectionist	65,866	36.5	-18.8	52	−14
Free Trade	65,850	36.5	−16.0	44	−27
Labor	37,216	20.6	+20.6	35	+35
Ind. Free Trade	6,684	3.7	+3.7	4	+4
Ind. Protectionist	3,627	2.0	+2.0	4	+4
Independent Labor	759	0.4	+0.4	1	+1
Independent	445	0.25	+0.25	1	+1
Total	202,042			141	

Popular vote
Protectionist	36.50%
Free Trade	36.49%
Labor	20.62%
Ind. Free Trade	3.70%
Ind. Protectionist	2.01%
Ind. Labor	0.42%
Independent	0.25%
Parliamentary seats
Protectionist	52
Free Trade	44
Labor	35
Ind. Free Trade	4
Ind. Protectionist	4
Ind. Labor	1
Independent	1

== Retiring members ==
=== Protectionist ===
- William Alison MLA (Bogan)
- Wyman Brown MLA (Sturt)
- Myles McRae MLA (Morpeth)
- Alfred Stokes MLA (Forbes)

=== Free Trade ===
- Charles Garland MLA (Carcoar)
- Thomas Garrett MLA (Camden)
- Alexander Hutchison MLA (Canterbury)
- Joseph Mitchell MLA (Illawarra)
- John Shepherd MLA (Paddington)
- Edwin Turner MLA (Gunnedah)
- James Wilshire MLA (Canterbury)
- Francis Woodward MLA (Illawarra)

=== Independent ===
- Adolphus Taylor MLA (West Sydney)
- Cecil Teece MLA (Goulburn)

== See also ==
- Members of the New South Wales Legislative Assembly, 1891–1894
- Candidates of the 1891 New South Wales colonial election

== Bibliography ==
- "Former members of the New South Wales Parliament, 1856-2006". New South Wales Parliament.
