= Electoral results for the district of Central Cumberland =

Election results for Central Cumberland, New South Wales, Australia

Central Cumberland, an electoral district of the Legislative Assembly in the Australian state of New South Wales was created in 1859 and abolished in 1894.

Election	Member	Party	Member	Party				
1859	John Laycock	None	James Atkinson	None				
1860	John Laycock	None	James Atkinson	None				
1863 by	John Laycock	None	Allan Macpherson	None				
1864	John Hay	None	Allan Macpherson	None				
1867 by	John Lackey	None	Allan Macpherson	None				
1868 by	John Lackey	None	Samuel Lyons	None				
1869	John Lackey	None	Edward Flood	None				
1872	John Lackey	None	John Hurley	None				
1875	John Lackey	None	Joseph Wearne	None				
1875 by	John Lackey	None	William Long	None				
1877 by	John Lackey	None	William Long	None				
1877	John Lackey	None	Andrew McCulloch	None				
1880	John Lackey	None	Andrew McCulloch	None				
1885 by	Varney Parkes	None	Andrew McCulloch	None	Member	Party		
1885	Varney Parkes	None	Andrew McCulloch	None	Nathaniel Bull	None		
1887	Varney Parkes	Free Trade	Andrew McCulloch	Free Trade	Frank Farnell	Free Trade		
1887 by	Varney Parkes	Free Trade	Andrew McCulloch	Free Trade	Frank Farnell	Free Trade		
March 1888 by	John Nobbs	Free Trade	Andrew McCulloch	Free Trade	Frank Farnell	Free Trade		
May 1888 by	John Nobbs	Free Trade	David Buchanan	Protectionist	Frank Farnell	Free Trade	Member	Party
1889	John Nobbs	Free Trade	Robert Ritchie	Free Trade	Frank Farnell	Free Trade	John Linsley	Free Trade
June 1889 by	John Nobbs	Free Trade	Robert Ritchie	Free Trade	Frank Farnell	Free Trade	David Dale	Free Trade
September 1889 by	John Nobbs	Free Trade	Robert Ritchie	Free Trade	Frank Farnell	Free Trade	David Dale	Free Trade
1891	John Nobbs	Free Trade	Robert Ritchie	Free Trade	Frank Farnell	Free Trade	David Dale	Free Trade
1891 by	John Nobbs	Free Trade	Jacob Garrard	Free Trade	Frank Farnell	Free Trade	David Dale	Free Trade
1893 by	George McCredie	Free Trade	Jacob Garrard	Free Trade	Frank Farnell	Free Trade	David Dale	Free Trade

== Election results ==
=== Elections in the 1890s ===
==== 1893 by-election ====
1893 Central Cumberland by-election Saturday 6 May
Party	Candidate	Votes	%	±%
Free Trade	George McCredie (elected)	2,417	66.2	
Free Trade	John Nobbs (defeated)	1,292	34.8	
Total formal votes		3,709	98.9	
Informal votes		40	1.1	
Turnout		3,749	37.8 (Note: based on an electoral roll of 9,914 at the 1891 election.)	
Free Trade hold				

John Nobbs (Free Trade) resigned due to bankruptcy.

==== 1891 by-election ====
1891 Central Cumberland by-election Saturday 29 August
Party	Candidate	Votes	%	±%
Free Trade	Jacob Garrard (elected)	1,674	39.3	
Labour	John Marshall	904	21.2	
Protectionist	John Gannon	679	16.0	
Protectionist	Cyrus Fuller	403	9.5	
Free Trade	Thomas Taylor	324	7.6	
Free Trade	William Brodie	272	6.4	
Total formal votes		4,256	97.5	
Informal votes		109	2.5	
Turnout		4,365	44.0	
Free Trade hold				

Robert Ritchie (Free Trade) died.

==== 1891 ====
1891 New South Wales colonial election: Central Cumberland Wednesday 17 June
Party	Candidate	Votes	%	±%
Free Trade	Frank Farnell (re-elected 1)	2,850	15.8	
Free Trade	Robert Ritchie (re-elected 2)	2,491	13.8	
Free Trade	John Nobbs (re-elected 3)	2,435	13.5	
Free Trade	David Dale (re-elected 4)	1,978	11.0	
Labour	John Gannon	1,614	9.0	
Protectionist	Cyrus Fuller	1,449	8.0	
Labour	John Marshall	1,389	7.7	
Protectionist	Walter Airey	1,092	6.1	
Ind. Free Trade	Thomas Taylor	1,016	5.6	
Ind. Free Trade	John Forsyth	964	5.4	
Ind. Free Trade	John Ferguson	740	4.1	
Total formal votes		18,018	99.1	
Informal votes		163	0.9	
Turnout		5,744	57.9	
Free Trade hold 4				

=== Elections in the 1880s ===
==== September 1889 by-election ====
1889 Central Cumberland by-election Saturday 28 September
Party	Candidate	Votes	%	±%
Free Trade	Frank Farnell (elected)	unopposed		
Free Trade hold				

Frank Farnell (Free Trade) resigned due to bankruptcy.

==== June 1889 by-election ====
1889 Central Cumberland by-election Saturday 22 June
Party	Candidate	Votes	%	±%
Free Trade	David Dale (elected)	1,985	48.0	
Protectionist	Alban Gee	1,657	40.1	
Ind. Free Trade	William Brodie	468	11.3	
Free Trade	Thomas Taylor	27	0.7	
Total formal votes		4,137	97.7	
Informal votes		97	2.3	
Turnout		4,234	43.2	
Free Trade hold				

The by-election was caused by the death of John Linsley (Free Trade).

==== 1889 ====
1889 New South Wales colonial election: Central Cumberland Saturday 9 February
Party	Candidate	Votes	%	±%
Free Trade	Frank Farnell (elected 1)	3,339	17.1	
Free Trade	John Nobbs (elected 2)	3,222	16.5	
Free Trade	Robert Ritchie (elected 3)	3,143	16.1	
Free Trade	John Linsley (elected 4)	3,040	15.5	
Protectionist	Alban Gee	1,806	9.2	
Protectionist	Nathaniel Bull	1,797	9.2	
Protectionist	Warden Graves	1,622	8.3	
Protectionist	John Thorpe	1,595	8.2	
Total formal votes		19,564	99.6	
Informal votes		84	0.4	
Turnout		5,059	52.2	
Free Trade hold 3 and win 1		(1 new seat)		

David Buchanan (Protectionist) won a seat in a by-election in May 1888 and unsuccessfully contested Balmain.

==== May 1888 by-election ====
1888 Central Cumberland by-election Tuesday 15 May
Party	Candidate	Votes	%	±%
Protectionist	David Buchanan (elected)	1,222	48.5	
Free Trade	George Simpson	954	37.8	
Ind. Free Trade	Thomas Taylor	345	13.7	
Total formal votes		2,521	97.1	
Informal votes		76	2.9	
Turnout		2,597	28.8	
Protectionist gain from Free Trade				

The by-election was caused by the resignation of Andrew McCulloch (Free Trade).

==== March 1888 by-election ====
1888 Central Cumberland by-election Wednesday 14 March
Party	Candidate	Votes	%	±%
Free Trade	John Nobbs (elected)	1,923	57.0	
Protectionist	John Watkin	1,453	43.0	
Total formal votes		3,376	98.0	
Informal votes		68	2.8	
Turnout		3,444	38.3	
Free Trade hold				

The by-election was caused by the resignation of Varney Parkes (Free Trade).

==== 1887 by-election ====
1887 Central Cumberland by-election Wednesday 28 December
Party	Candidate	Votes	%	±%
Free Trade	Andrew McCulloch (elected)	1,667	55.8	
Protectionist	Nathaniel Bull	1,322	44.2	
Total formal votes		2,989	97.2	
Informal votes		87	2.8	
Turnout		3,076	34.2	
Free Trade hold				

Andrew McCulloch (Free Trade) resigned due to insolvency.

==== 1887 ====
1887 New South Wales colonial election: Central Cumberland Saturday 12 February
Party	Candidate	Votes	%	±%
Free Trade	Varney Parkes (re-elected 1)	2,404	25.8	
Free Trade	Andrew McCulloch (re-elected 2)	2,119	22.7	
Free Trade	Frank Farnell (elected 3)	1,861	19.9	
Free Trade	John Nobbs	1,775	19.0	
Protectionist	Nathaniel Bull (defeated)	1,173	12.6	
Total formal votes		9,332	99.3	
Informal votes		67	0.7	
Turnout		4,040	51.3	

==== 1885 ====
1885 New South Wales colonial election: Central Cumberland Thursday 29 October
Candidate	Votes	%
Andrew McCulloch (re-elected 1)	1,953	21.3
Nathaniel Bull (elected 2)	1,879	20.5
Varney Parkes (re-elected 3)	1,858	20.3
Cyrus Fuller	1,503	16.4
Charles Scrivener	973	10.6
Frank Farnell	808	8.8
Henry Statham	180	2.0
Total formal votes	9,154	98.6
Informal votes	128	1.4
Turnout	3,976	66.2
	(1 new seat)	

==== 1885 by-election ====
1885 Central Cumberland by-election Thursday 24 September
Candidate	Votes	%
Varney Parkes (elected)	1,266	51.3
Nathaniel Bull	1,203	48.7
Total formal votes	2,469	97.2
Informal votes	70	2.8
Turnout	2,539	42.2

The by-election was caused by the resignation of John Lackey who was appointed to the Legislative Council.

==== 1882 ====
1882 New South Wales colonial election: Central Cumberland Tuesday 5 December
Candidate	Votes	%
Andrew McCulloch (re-elected 1)	1,419	39.0
John Lackey (re-elected 2)	1,258	34.6
Nathaniel Bull	964	26.5
Total formal votes	3,641	98.9
Informal votes	39	1.1
Turnout	2,404	62.3

==== 1880 ====
1880 New South Wales colonial election: Central Cumberland Monday 22 November
Candidate	Votes	%
John Lackey (re-elected 1)	1,470	41.0
Andrew McCulloch (re-elected 2)	1,350	37.6
Thomas Wearne	770	21.5
Total formal votes	3,590	99.0
Informal votes	36	1.0
Turnout	2,216	62.9

=== Elections in the 1870s ===
==== 1877 ====
1877 New South Wales colonial election: Central Cumberland Monday 29 October
Candidate	Votes	%
John Lackey (re-elected)	unopposed	
Andrew McCulloch (elected)	unopposed	

The other sitting member William Long successfully contested Parramatta.

==== 1877 by-election ====
1877 Central Cumberland by-election Friday 31 August
Candidate	Votes	%
John Lackey (elected 1)	874	54.8
William Long (elected 2)	722	45.2
Robert Graham	134	10.8
Jeremiah O'Connell	52	4.2
Total formal votes	1,236	99.2
Informal votes	10	0.0
Turnout	1,246	27.4 (Note: based on an electoral roll of 2,270 at the 1875 by-election)

The by-election was caused by the appointment of William Long and John Lackey to positions in the fourth Robertson ministry.

==== 1875 by-election ====
1875 Central Cumberland by-election Monday 28 June
Candidate	Votes	%
William Long (elected)	874	54.8
Andrew McCulloch	722	45.2
Total formal votes	1,596	100.0
Informal votes	0	0.0
Turnout	1,596	70.3

Joseph Wearne rsigned.

==== 1874-75 ====
1874–75 New South Wales colonial election: Central Cumberland Friday 8 January 1875
Candidate	Votes	%
John Lackey (re-elected 1)	692	28.9
Joseph Wearne (elected 2)	624	26.0
Joseph O'Connor	391	16.3
Andrew McCulloch	328	13.7
Charles Jeanneret	256	10.7
Nicholas Raven	99	4.1
Maurice Reynolds	8	0.3
Total formal votes	2,398	100.0
Informal votes	0	0.0
Turnout	2,398	55.1

==== 1872 ====
1872 New South Wales colonial election: Central Cumberland Thursday 22 February
Candidate	Votes	%
John Lackey (re-elected 1)	762	42.2
John Hurley (elected 2)	573	31.7
Henry Zions	431	23.8
Frederick Birmingham	34	1.9
Total formal votes	8	100.0
Informal votes	1,808	0.0
Turnout	1,808	39.4

=== Elections in the 1860s ===
==== 1869-70 ====
1869–70 New South Wales colonial election: Central Cumberland Tuesday 28 December 1869
Candidate	Votes	%
John Lackey (re-elected 1)	713	29.4
Edward Flood (elected 2)	629	25.9
William Campbell	616	25.4
James Jones	467	19.3
Total formal votes	2,425	100.0
Informal votes	0	0.0
Turnout	1,900	78.6

==== 1868 by-election ====
1868 Central Cumberland by-election Thursday 17 December
Candidate	Votes	%
Samuel Lyons (elected)	495	52.9
James Jones	440	47.1
Total formal votes	935	100.0
Informal votes	0	0.0
Turnout	935	43.3

Allan Macpherson resigned.

==== 1867 by-election ====
1867 Central Cumberland by-election Thursday 27 June
Candidate	Votes	%
John Lackey (elected)	314	53.3
Robert Graham	53	46.7
Total formal votes	367	100.0
Informal votes	0	0.0
Turnout	367	18.1

The by-election was caused by the resignation of John Hay who was then appointed to the Legislative Council.

==== 1864-65 ====
1864–65 New South Wales colonial election: Central Cumberland Saturday 26 November 1864
Candidate	Votes	%
John Hay (re-elected 1)	584	33.6
Allan Macpherson (re-elected 2)	549	31.6
John Laycock (defeated)	401	23.1
George Oakes	184	10.6
James Atkinson	19	1.1
Total formal votes	1,737	100.0
Informal votes	0	0.0
Turnout	1,737	38.8

==== 1863 by-election ====
1863 Central Cumberland by-election Saturday 6 June
Candidate	Votes	%
Allan Macpherson (elected)	586	53.3
James Atkinson (defeated)	514	46.7
Total formal votes	1,100	100.0
Informal votes	0	0.0
Turnout	1,100	50.1

James Atkinson resigned due to insolvency and re-contested the seat.

==== 1860 ====
1860 New South Wales colonial election: Central Cumberland Saturday 22 December 1860
Candidate	Votes	%
John Laycock (re-elected 1)	346	25.2
James Atkinson (re-elected 2)	335	24.4
David Bell	294	21.4
James Farnell	215	15.7
Allan Macpherson	184	13.4
Total formal votes	1,374	100.0
Informal votes	0	0.0
Turnout	1,374	36.6

James Farnell was the member for St Leonards and had already unsuccessfully contested Goldfields West.

=== Elections in the 1850s ===
==== 1859 ====
1859 New South Wales colonial election: Central Cumberland Thursday 23 June
Candidate	Votes	%
James Atkinson (elected 1)	389	35.1
John Laycock (elected 2)	358	32.3
John Lackey	343	30.9
John Beit	20	1.8
Total formal votes	1,110	100.0
Informal votes	0	0.0
Turnout	1,110	32.8
