= 1885 Central Cumberland colonial by-election =

By-election in New South Wales, Australia

A by-election was held for the New South Wales Legislative Assembly electorate of Central Cumberland on 21 November 1885 because of the resignation of John Lackey who was appointed to the Legislative Council.

== Dates ==
Date	Event
30 August 1885	John Lackey resigned.
9 September 1885	Writ of election issued by the Speaker of the Legislative Assembly.
18 September 1885	Nominations
24 September 1885	Polling day
29 September 1885	Return of writ

== Result ==
1885 Central Cumberland by-election Thursday 24 September
Candidate	Votes	%
Varney Parkes (elected)	1,266	51.3
Nathaniel Bull	1,203	48.7
Total formal votes	2,469	97.2
Informal votes	70	2.8
Turnout	2,539	42.2

== See also ==
- Electoral results for the district of Central Cumberland
- List of New South Wales state by-elections
