= June 1889 Central Cumberland colonial by-election =

By-election in New South Wales, Australia

A by-election was held for the New South Wales Legislative Assembly electorate of Central Cumberland on 22 June 1889 because of the death of John Linsley (Free Trade).

== Dates ==
Date	Event
4 June 1889	John Linsley died.
7 June 1889	Writ of election issued by the Speaker of the Legislative Assembly.
15 June 1889	Nominations
22 June 1889	Polling day from 8 am until 4 pm
29 June 1889	Return of writ

== Candidates ==
- William Brodie was an auctioneer from Parramatta
- David Dale was the "official" Free Trade candidate.
- Alban Gee was well respected in the district and personally popular.
- Thomas Taylor had split the Free Trade vote at the May 1888 by-election, and withdrew before polling day.

== Result ==
1889 Central Cumberland by-election Saturday 22 June
Party	Candidate	Votes	%	±%
Free Trade	David Dale (elected)	1,985	48.0	
Protectionist	Alban Gee	1,657	40.1	
Ind. Free Trade	William Brodie	468	11.3	
Free Trade	Thomas Taylor	27	0.7	
Total formal votes		4,137	97.7	
Informal votes		97	2.3	
Turnout		4,234	43.2	
Free Trade hold				

== See also ==
- Electoral results for the district of Central Cumberland
- List of New South Wales state by-elections
