= 1891 Central Cumberland colonial by-election =

By-election in New South Wales, Australia

A by-election was held for the New South Wales Legislative Assembly electorate of Central Cumberland on 29 August 1891 because of the death of Robert Ritchie (Free Trade).

== Dates ==
Date	Event
16 August 1891	Robert Ritchie died.
20 August 1891	Writ of election issued by the Speaker of the Legislative Assembly.
22 August 1891	Nominations
29 August 1891	Polling day from 8 am until 4 pm
8 September 1891	Return of writ

== Result ==
1891 Central Cumberland by-election]] Saturday 29 August
Party	Candidate	Votes	%	±%
Free Trade	Jacob Garrard (elected)	1,674	39.3	
Labour	John Marshall	904	21.2	
Protectionist	John Gannon	679	16.0	
Protectionist	Cyrus Fuller	403	9.5	
Free Trade	Thomas Taylor	324	7.6	
Free Trade	William Brodie	272	6.4	
Total formal votes		4,256	97.5	
Informal votes		109	2.5	
Turnout		4,365	44.0	
Free Trade hold				

== See also ==
- Electoral results for the district of Central Cumberland
- List of New South Wales state by-elections
