= 1887 Central Cumberland colonial by-election =

By-election in New South Wales, Australia

A by-election was held for the New South Wales Legislative Assembly electorate of Central Cumberland on 24 December 1887 because of the resignation of Andrew McCulloch (Free Trade) due to insolvency, having assigned his estate for the benefit of his creditors.

== Dates ==
Date	Event
12 December 1887	Andrew McCulloch assigned his estate for the benefit of his creditors.
14 December 1887	Andrew McCulloch resigned.
14 December 1887	Writ of election issued by the Speaker of the Legislative Assembly.
20 December 1887	Nominations
24 December 1887	Polling day from 8 am until 4 pm
29 December 1887	Return of writ

== Candidates ==
- Nathaniel Bull (Protectionist) was a former member for Central Cumberland who had been defeated at the election in February 1887.
- Andrew McCulloch (Free Trade) was the sitting member.

== Result ==
1887 Central Cumberland by-election Wednesday 28 December
Party	Candidate	Votes	%	±%
Free Trade	Andrew McCulloch (elected)	1,667	55.8	
Protectionist	Nathaniel Bull	1,322	44.2	
Total formal votes		2,989	97.2	
Informal votes		87	2.8	
Turnout		3,076	34.2	
Free Trade hold				

== See also ==
- Electoral results for the district of Central Cumberland
- List of New South Wales state by-elections
