= 1893 Central Cumberland colonial by-election =

By-election in New South Wales, Australia

A by-election was held for the New South Wales Legislative Assembly electorate of Central Cumberland on 6 May 1893 because of the resignation of John Nobbs (Free Trade) due to bankruptcy.

== Dates ==
| Date | Event |
|---|---|
| 26 April 1893 | John Nobbs resigned. |
| 27 April 1893 | Writ of election issued by the Speaker of the Legislative Assembly. |
| 29 April 1893 | Nominations |
| 6 May 1893 | Polling day from 8 am until 4 pm |
| 13 May 1893 | Return of writ |

== Candidates ==
- John Nobbs was the former member.
- George McCredie was the Mayor of Prospect and Sherwood.

== Result ==
1893 Central Cumberland by-election Saturday 6 May
| Party | Candidate | Votes | % | ±% |
|---|---|---|---|---|
| Free Trade | George McCredie (elected) | 2,417 | 66.2 | |
| Free Trade | John Nobbs (defeated) | 1,292 | 34.8 | |
| Total formal votes | | 3,709 | 98.9 | |
| Informal votes | | 40 | 1.1 | |
| Turnout | | 3,749 | 37.8 (Note: based on an electoral roll of 9,914 at the 1891 election.) | |
| Free Trade hold | | | | |

== See also ==
- Electoral results for the district of Central Cumberland
- List of New South Wales state by-elections
