= March 1888 Central Cumberland colonial by-election =

By-election in New South Wales, Australia

A by-election was held for the New South Wales Legislative Assembly electorate of Central Cumberland on 14 March 1888 because of the resignation of Varney Parkes (Free Trade).

== Dates ==
Date	Event
1 March 1888	Varney Parkes resigned.
2 March 1888	Writ of election issued by the Speaker of the Legislative Assembly.
8 March 1888	Nominations
14 March 1888	Polling day from 8 am until 4 pm
19 March 1888	Return of writ

== Result ==
1888 Central Cumberland by-election Wednesday 14 March
Party	Candidate	Votes	%	±%
Free Trade	John Nobbs (elected)	1,923	57.0	
Protectionist	John Watkin	1,453	43.0	
Total formal votes		3,376	98.0	
Informal votes		68	2.8	
Turnout		3,444	38.3	
Free Trade hold				

== See also ==
- Electoral results for the district of Central Cumberland
- List of New South Wales state by-elections
