= 1889 Central Cumberland colonial by-election =

1889 Central Cumberland colonial by-election may refer to

- 1889 Central Cumberland colonial by-election 1 held on 22 June 1889
- 1889 Central Cumberland colonial by-election 2 held on 28 September 1889

== See also ==
- List of New South Wales state by-elections
