= 1877 Central Cumberland colonial by-election =

Election result for Central Cumberland, New South Wales, Australia

A by-election was held for the New South Wales Legislative Assembly electorate of Central Cumberland on 31 August 1877 because the seats of William Long and John Lackey were declared vacant as they had been appointed to positions in the fourth Robertson ministry. Long was appointed Colonial Treasurer, and Lackey was appointed Minister of Justice and Public Instruction. Such ministerial by-elections were usually uncontested however on this occasion, only Thomas Garrett (Camden) and Ezekiel Baker (Goldfields South) were unopposed. While the other ministers, John Robertson (West Sydney), John Davies (East Sydney) and Edward Combes (Orange) were opposed, all were re-elected.

== Dates ==
Date	Event
17 August 1877	William Long, and John Lackey, were appointed to the fourth Robertson ministry.
18 August 1877	Writ of election issued by the Speaker of the Legislative Assembly.
27 August 1877	Nominations
31 August 1877	Polling day
17 September 1877	Return of writ

== Result ==
1877 Central Cumberland by-election Friday 31 August
Candidate	Votes	%
John Lackey (elected 1)	874	54.8
William Long (elected 2)	722	45.2
Robert Graham	134	10.8
Jeremiah O'Connell	52	4.2
Total formal votes	1,236	99.2
Informal votes	10	0.0
Turnout	1,246	27.4 (Note: based on an electoral roll of 2,270 at the 1875 by-election)

== See also ==
- Electoral results for the district of Central Cumberland
- List of New South Wales state by-elections
