= 1888 Central Cumberland colonial by-election =

1888 Central Cumberland colonial by-election may refer to

- 1888 Central Cumberland colonial by-election 1 held on 14 March 1888
- 1888 Central Cumberland colonial by-election 2 held on 14 May 1888

== See also ==
- List of New South Wales state by-elections
