= 1875 Central Cumberland colonial by-election =

By-election in New South Wales, Australia

A by-election was held for the New South Wales Legislative Assembly electorate of Central Cumberland on 28 June 1875 because of the resignation of Joseph Wearne.

== Dates ==
Date	Event
12 June 1875	Joseph Wearne resigned.
15 June 1875	Writ of election issued by the Speaker of the Legislative Assembly.
24 June 1875	Nominations
28 June 1875	Polling day
12 July 1875	Return of writ

== Result ==
1875 Central Cumberland by-election Monday 28 June
Candidate	Votes	%
William Long (elected)	874	54.8
Andrew McCulloch	722	45.2
Total formal votes	1,596	100.0
Informal votes	0	0.0
Turnout	1,596	70.3

== See also ==
- Electoral results for the district of Central Cumberland
- List of New South Wales state by-elections
