= 1867 Central Cumberland colonial by-election =

By-election in New South Wales, Australia

A by-election was held for the New South Wales Legislative Assembly electorate of Central Cumberland on 27 June 1867 because of the resignation of John Hay who was then appointed to the Legislative Council.

== Dates ==
Date	Event
27 May 1867	John Hay resigned.
5 June 1867	Writ of election issued by the Speaker of the Legislative Assembly.
24 June 1867	Nominations
27 June 1867	Polling day
5 July 1867	Return of writ

== Result ==
1867 Central Cumberland by-election Thursday 27 June
Candidate	Votes	%
John Lackey (elected)	314	53.3
Robert Graham	53	46.7
Total formal votes	367	100.0
Informal votes	0	0.0
Turnout	367	18.1

== See also ==
- Electoral results for the district of Central Cumberland
- List of New South Wales state by-elections
