= August 1877 Orange colonial by-election =

By-election in New South Wales, Australia

A by-election was held for the New South Wales Legislative Assembly electorate of Orange on 30 August 1877. The by-election was triggered because Edward Combes had been appointed Secretary for Public Works in the fourth Robertson ministry. Such ministerial by-elections were usually uncontested; however on this occasion, only Thomas Garrett (Camden) and Ezekiel Baker (Goldfields South) were unopposed. While the other ministers, John Robertson (West Sydney), John Davies (East Sydney), John Lackey, and William Long (both Central Cumberland) were opposed, all were re-elected.

== Dates ==
Date	Event
17 August 1877	Edward Combes appointed Secretary for Public Works.
18 August 1877	Writ of election issued by the Speaker of the Legislative Assembly.
27 August 1877	Nominations
30 August 1877	Polling day
17 September 1877	Return of writ

== Results ==
1877 Orange by-election Thursday 30 August
Candidate	Votes	%
Edward Combes (elected)	571	76.6
John Ardill	174	23.4
Total formal votes	745	97.5
Informal votes	11	1.5
Turnout	756	32.8 (Note: estimate based on a roll of 2,305 as at February 1877.)

== See also ==
- Electoral results for the district of Orange
- List of New South Wales state by-elections
