= 1877 West Sydney colonial by-election =

By-election in New South Wales, Australia

A by-election was held for the New South Wales Legislative Assembly electorate of West Sydney on 15 July 1877 because Sir John Robertson was appointed Colonial Secretary, forming the fourth Robertson ministry. Such ministerial by-elections were usually uncontested however on this occasion a poll was required in Central Cumberland (John Lackey and William Long), East Sydney (John Davies), Orange (Edward Combes) and West Sydney. Each minister was comfortably re-elected. Only Camden (Thomas Garrett) and Goldfields South (Ezekiel Baker) were uncontested.

== Dates ==
Date	Event
17 August 1877	Fourth Robertson ministry appointed.
18 August 1877	Writ of election issued by the Speaker of the Legislative Assembly.
24 August 1877	Nominations
27 August 1877	Polling day
17 September 1877	Return of writ

== Candidates ==
- Sir John Robertson had been a member for West Sydney since 1869, having previously represented the district from 1864 to 1866. This was the final occasion on which he was elected for the district, being defeated two months later at the 1877 election, but was then elected to both East Macquarie and Mudgee.
- Thomas White was the president of the Seamen's Union and a former secretary of the Trades and Labor Council. This was his first time standing for election to the Legislative Assembly and he would also stand unsuccessfully for West Sydney at the 1877, and 1880 elections.

== Result ==
1877 West Sydney by-election Monday 27 August
Candidate	Votes	%
Sir John Robertson (re-elected)	1,703	54.6
Thomas White	1,414	45.4
Total formal votes	3,117	97.0
Informal votes	97	3.0
Turnout	3,214	31.8 (Note: estimate based on an electoral roll of 10,097 at October 1877.)

== See also ==
- Electoral results for the district of West Sydney
- List of New South Wales state by-elections
