= 1868 Central Cumberland colonial by-election =

By-election in New South Wales, Australia

A by-election was held for the New South Wales Legislative Assembly electorate of Central Cumberland on 17 December 1868 because of the resignation of Allan Macpherson, who left the colony to return to Europe.

== Dates ==
| Date | Event |
|---|---|
| 31 October 1868 | Allan Macpherson resigned. |
| 24 November 1868 | Writ of election issued by the Speaker of the Legislative Assembly. |
| 14 December 1868 | Nominations |
| 17 December 1868 | Polling day |
| 31 December 1868 | Return of writ |

== Result ==
1868 Central Cumberland by-election Thursday 17 December
| Candidate | Votes | % |
|---|---|---|
| Samuel Lyons (elected) | 495 | 52.9 |
| James Jones | 440 | 47.1 |
| Total formal votes | 935 | 100.0 |
| Informal votes | 0 | 0.0 |
| Turnout | 935 | 43.3 |

== See also ==
- Electoral results for the district of Central Cumberland
- List of New South Wales state by-elections
