= 1877 East Sydney colonial by-election =

By-election in New South Wales, Australia

A by-election was held for the New South Wales Legislative Assembly electorate of East Sydney on 15 July 1877 because John Davies was appointed Postmaster-General in the fourth Robertson ministry. Such ministerial by-elections were usually uncontested however on this occasion a poll was required in Central Cumberland (John Lackey and William Long), East Sydney, Orange (Edward Combes) and West Sydney (John Robertson). Each minister was comfortably re-elected. Only Camden (Thomas Garrett) and Goldfields South (Ezekiel Baker) were uncontested.

== Dates ==
Date	Event
17 August 1877	Fourth Robertson ministry appointed.
18 August 1877	Writ of election issued by the Speaker of the Legislative Assembly.
25 August 1877	Nominations
28 August 1877	Polling day
17 September 1877	Return of writ

== Result ==
1877 East Sydney by-election Tuesday 28 August
Candidate	Votes	%
John Davies (re-elected)	3,137	79.9
Ninian Melville	790	20.1
Total formal votes	3,927	98.5
Informal votes	60	1.5
Turnout	3,987	32.3 (Note: estimate based on an electoral roll of 12,326 at March 1877)

== See also ==
- Electoral results for the district of East Sydney
- List of New South Wales state by-elections
