= May 1888 Central Cumberland colonial by-election =

By-election in New South Wales, Australia

A by-election was held for the New South Wales Legislative Assembly electorate of Central Cumberland on 14 May 1888 because of the resignation of Andrew McCulloch (Free Trade) who was facing financial difficulties. He announced his intention to recontest the seat at the by-election, even though he decided not to stand.

== Dates ==
Date	Event
1 May 1888	Andrew McCulloch resigned.
2 May 1888	Writ of election issued by the Speaker of the Legislative Assembly.
8 May 1888	Nominations
15 May 1888	Polling day from 8 am until 4 pm
21 May 1888	Return of writ

== Result ==
1888 Central Cumberland by-election Tuesday 15 May
Party	Candidate	Votes	%	±%
Protectionist	David Buchanan (elected)	1,222	48.5	
Free Trade	George Simpson	954	37.8	
Ind. Free Trade	Thomas Taylor	345	13.7	
Total formal votes		2,521	97.1	
Informal votes		76	2.9	
Turnout		2,597	28.8	
Protectionist gain from Free Trade				

== See also ==
- Electoral results for the district of Central Cumberland
- List of New South Wales state by-elections
