= Linnwood, Guildford =

Linnwood
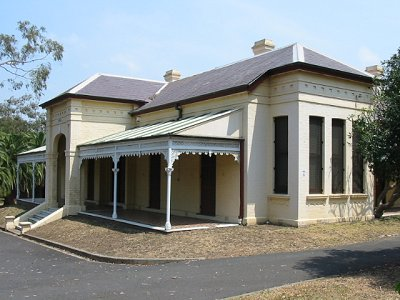

- Location within Sydney
- 33°51′17″S 150°58′31″E
- Location: 11–35 Byron Road, Guildford, Cumberland Council, New South Wales, Australia

History
- Built: 1891

Site notes
- Architect: George McCredie
- Architectural style: Victorian Italianate
- Owner: Cumberland Council; Department of Planning and Environment

New South Wales Heritage Register
- Official name: Linnwood; Linwood Hall; Lynwood Hall; Guildford Truant School
- Type: State heritage (complex / group)
- Designated: 21 February 2003
- Reference no.: 1661
- Type: Historic Landscape
- Category: Landscape – Cultural
- Builders: George McCredie

Linnwood is a heritage-listed former residence, school, local history museum and children's home and now historical society located at 11–35 Byron Road, Guildford in the Cumberland Council local government area of New South Wales, Australia. It was designed and built by George McCredie during 1891. It is also known as Linwood Hall, Lynwood Hall and Guildford Truant School. The property is owned by the Cumberland Council and the NSW Office of Environment and Heritage. It was added to the New South Wales State Heritage Register on 21 February 2003.

== History ==
=== Colonial history ===
Prior to the first land grants been given in the area the Merrylands and Guildford area was set aside for use as church and school lands for the district of Parramatta. Approximately 404 hectares (1,000 acres) were set aside following the settlement of Parramatta as a means of raising money for the continual upkeep of churches and schools in the Parramatta area through funds raised from the use of the lands. However, much of this land was never to be used in this manner, and in 1837 the first major land grant of the area was given. Guildford was named after the Earl of Guildford, a relative of Lieutenant Samuel North, the first major landowner in the area. In the 1860s and 1870s many of these larger estates were subdivided for the first time and in 1871 a provisional school was constructed in what is now Old Guildford with the permanent school built in 1876.

The Guildford area continued to grow slowly during the late 19th and early 20th century during which time the McCredie family came to the area, purchased land, and built Linnwood. During this time the area was described as a "busy though not populous fruit growing district" in 1886 and in 1888 a newspaper noted, "Like its name sake, the metropolis of Surrey, Guildford is a place of hills and also of fields and orchards; like the neighbouring districts it is known for its fruit." Into the 20th century the area was still described as a "tiny village" and "almost unknown" but in the second decade of the century a building boom took place."' In 1915 a police station, a fire station, and industry such as a brickworks, all came to the area of Guildford as it grew into a busy suburb with new residences, shops and citizens."

=== McCredie family ===
George McCredie, his wife Susan, and their nine children, moved to Guildford in early 1891, having constructed Linnwood as their country home. The McCredies, and George in particular, promptly proceeded to become involved in all facets of life in Guildford.

George McCredie was born in 1859 at "The Glebe" in Pyrmont Sydney, and was the son of a builder from Northern Ireland. He was educated at Fort Street Public School and left to become an apprentice carpenter with the Australasian Steam Navigation Company (ASN Co.) at the age of 14. At the age of 18 he was made a foreman and took a company of men to Townsville in North Queensland to construct the first large wharf in the area. In 1880 he married Susan Faulds Blackwood, daughter of James Blackwood of J. Blackwood and Sons Engineering Company. In 1880 he left the company and travelled overseas in a world trip and visited the "old country" to gain practical experience and to acquaint himself with the wider and larger enterprises of the rest of the world. Following his return to Australia he joined a partnership with his brother in A.L. (Arthur) & G. McCredie and Sons, Architects and Consulting Engineers, and undertook professional training at night school under the supervision of a Professor Jones.

McCredie and Sons were associated with the construction of many large and important buildings in Sydney and along the waterfront and often worked for the government as private contractors to undertake their proposed works. The McCredies were involved in engineering works for warehouses, factories, stores docks and reclamation projects and were responsible for or associated with the building of many buildings around Sydney such as "Montana" in Glebe (Sydney Home Nursing Service Headquarters), George Patterson House on George Street (The Establishment), the Burns Philip Building in Bridge Street, the Mark Foy Retail Building and the Sydney GPO in Martin Place. As well as the construction of such buildings the McCredies also worked for the government on larger projects such as the planning and construction of tunnels for telephone wires throughout the city and the cleansing of The Rocks area following the outbreak of the bubonic plague in 1900.

In 1891 George McCredie and his family moved from Glebe to Linnwood in Guildford and became heavily involved in the local community and political life. In 1892 he became a Justice of the Peace and in 1900 he undertook his most notable professional experience in co-ordinating the cleansing of The Rocks following the outbreak of the Bubonic Plague.

A long winding gravel driveway leads to Linnwood house which is built on rising ground. The gardens were at one time extensively landscaped and featured water fountains, summer house, schoolroom and a hall where church services for the small township of Guildford were held. Linnwood was designed in the Italianate style with a central portico flanked by French windows and segmented projecting bays. A feature to be noted are the stained glass windows and doors in the main house.

George became involved in the local community and was elected alderman of the Prospect and Sherwood Council and for some years served as Mayor. He had designed and constructed the maze of underground telephone cable tunnels that are still used today for that purpose and Linnwood was the first to be connected to the telephone system from Sydney.

George established Presbyterian services in a hall on his property in 1894. The family lived comfortably in this quiet rural estate until George McCredie died, aged 44, at Linnwood of unknown causes following a period of sickness in 1903. He had been appointed by the Government to take charge of the clean up and stop the advance of bubonic plague throughout Sydney. His first priority was to inspect and assess the infected districts. Areas were cleared one at a time of the "accumulation of filth, the utter disregard of sanitary arrangements and numerous sad cases of poverty". Volunteers were understandably reluctant to assist in clearing rubbish and demolition of buildings. 17,000 rats were killed during the demolitions that stretched from the Rocks to Chippendale and also to Manly, where a further 27,548 were destroyed at the quarantine depot. As a result of the close contact with the plague, George died "from an illness attributed to the effects of the plague".

He was survived by Susan Faulds McCredie and eight children (James McCredie, his son, died in 1895 at the age of thirteen at Rewa in Glebe). Susan McCredie later left Linnwood, initially leasing it and then selling it to the Department of Education, before moving to Wahroonga where she died in 1936. After George's death the community contributed money to build the neat brick George McCredie Memorial Church in Guildford Road, on land donated by the family.

=== Use as a state school and children's home ===
In November 1889, Susan McCredie was formally registered as the owner of Lots 15, 16, 17, 24 and 25 of Section of Henry Whittaker's estate, via his executor, Joseph Byrnes. Linnwood was subsequently erected on Lots 25 and 24. George McCredie witnessed the transfer, but held no interest in ownership of the land. The land was purchased for A£750. Susan McCredie also purchased six lots adjoining the property to the North with a frontage to Guildford Road (lots 6 to 10, Sect D, DP 2403 - Vol 952 Fol 63).

In June 1892, after having been elected to the Mayoralty of Prospect and Sherwood, George McCredie entertained his fellow alderman, and two local press men, at Linnwood. Near identical descriptions of the property were published in the Cumberland Mercury and the Cumberland Argus in the following week. The report notes that the house and grounds were connected to town water (the Water Supply Pipeline to the North of Linnwood was connected in 1886) and the electric lighting was generated on site.

Linnwood is described not as a villa, or a mansion, but as an "extensive cottage". The interior was described as "comfort trenching on the confines of luxuriousness" - but certainly not opulence. This report confirms the others in the description of the rooms. At the rear, the breakfast room and kitchen were to the left of the court, the laundry and "other offices" to the right. For the grounds, the report describes roses, a tennis court in front of the house, "a Church behind the vines to the west, a range of model stables and coach-houses down south where the electric light plant is stored; a coachman's quarters fountains, a swimming bath, gigantic swings and summer-houses, growing crops, and avenues, and poultry yards.

Susan McCredie also purchased a substantial amount of the surrounding land of Whittaker's Estate, including all of Sections E, F, G, and 1, and substantial parts of Sections J, L, and A. By 1901, Susan McCredie owned most of the land between Guildford Road, in the North, Byron Road to the East, Whittakers Road to the West, and Pine Road and the Great Southern Railway to the south. In December 1901, Real Estate agents Mobbs and Hunt advertised for sale most of the large area of Whitaker's Estate purchased by Susan McCredie earlier in the year. Sales of land however did not begin apace for some years. The land was advertised as comprising "orchard, vineyard blocks, factory, villa & business sites".

In 1901, Susan McCredie purchased from Joseph Byrnes more allotments of land at Guildford, including the triangular portion of land between the water pipeline and Guildford Road, on which the George McCredie Memorial Church was later erected. In May 1902, Lot 78 was transferred from Susan McCredie to her husband George, David Davidson, and Alexander George, in equal parts. All three were active committee members locally in the Presbyterian church, and it is tempting to see in this transfer an intention to alienate this land for construction of a Presbyterian church, and therefore the basis for the local lore that the McCredie family donated the land for the church.

In 1890, Susan McCredie's brother, Ludovic Blackwood, had purchased land from the Whittaker Estate, acquiring Lots 18 to 23 of Section D, which adjoined the property on which Linnwood was subsequently built, and fronted Carrington. In December 1901, Ludovic Blackwood's land was transferred to Susan McCredie. However, in 1907, the same land was transferred back to her brother Ludovic. The nature or purpose of these transactions is unclear. From this time onwards, the substantial estate of Susan McCredie at Guildford was progressively sold. The sale of allotments was particularly frequent during the 1920s, especially in 1922 and 1925 providing Susan McCredie with a steady stream of income.

A Sketch plan has survived on PWD files illustrating the Linnwood property at the end of Susan McCredie's period of ownership. Perhaps drawn as early as 1917, the plan has been later stamped by the Miscellaneous Branch of the Lands Department in October 1921. Aside from the house itself, other buildings on the property at the time included the summer house, the stables, cottage and shed on the Southern boundary. Near the tennis courts is a small building, which given its location may have housed sporting equipment. The property was fenced into different sections. The East portion of the land was cleared, and featured tennis courts and baths (the nature of the latter is unexplained). The entrance drive was separately fenced. Linnwood itself was surrounded by gardens, including a lawn area on the North side of the house. At the South of the main garden area, a cultivated portion was fenced off. At the rear of the site, an orchard was planted and fenced. A narrow fenced path appears to have run between the orchard and the garden from the rear service wings of Linnwood to the stables and cottage. It appears from early photos that this might have been latticed, and provided a screen between the family recreation areas and the passage of staff and workmen. This presents an insight into physical barriers to reflect class segregation at the time.

==== Truant school ====
In 1917, the Department of Education began looking for a suitable location for a new Truant School. A. L. Hinton, a Sydney real estate agent, was consulted, and offered several properties in the Parramatta region. In July 1917, Linnwood was included in the list of properties and the particulars of the residence and grounds were described. By September negotiations were in progress for the lease of the land from Mrs McCredie, with an option of purchasing the property during the life of the lease for (Pounds)5,000. Among the reasons for choosing Linnwood for the Truant School were its location, and ample accommodation and grounds: "it is more or less isolated although within easy reach of the Railway Station. There is sufficient accommodation for the staff without any additions and ample ground to provide suitable occupation for the boys after school hours. A Department of Education architect's report in September 1917, stated that Linwood was in a very good state of repair, and had only two or three slight cracks. A lease of the site from Mrs McCredie by the Crown was entered into, to commence at the beginning of December 1917.

The philosophy behind the measures taken to control truancy was that truancy is "the vestibule of all juvenile delinquency". The aim of the Truant School was to avoid the truant becoming a "Juvenile offender". One such truant was the notorious Sydney Gunman "Chow Hayes" (Cameron White, NSW Heritage Office) Though the truant school itself was run by the Education Department, the policing of truancy was conducted by the Child Welfare Department. All children between the ages of 7 and 14 were, by law, required to attend school. The position of Superintendent for the new Truant School was advertised at the end of 1917, and from nine candidates, the successful applicant was Charles Dawson.

The superintendent commenced duties on 1 February 1918 and the final boys were admitted on 19 March 1918. The staff consisted of the Superintendent (Charles. E. Dawson), Mrs Dawson, who was appointed as supervisor of domestic arrangements, a male attendant, a female attendant, a cook and a laundress-general. A residence, situated in 4.65 hectares (11.5 acres) of ground, was first rented and then purchased by the department. The land has a frontage of 161 metres (528 ft) to Byron Road and a depth of 291.7 metres. The final accommodation consisted of twelve beds. In May 1918 the accommodation was increased to 20 beds, and in December 1918 a further six beds were installed. In November 1919 an additional male attendant was appointed and the accommodation was increased to 50 by temporary arrangements which meant much congestion.

"In April 1920 an additional female attendant was appointed. In October 1920 twenty five more beds were added and placed on outside verandahs which were most unsuitable in wet weather. In December 1920 a single portable class room with an attendant's bedroom attached, was erected. The class room was used as a dormitory. In September 1921 a nightwatchman was appointed, and in October 1921 a first assistant teacher commenced duties. In November 1921 a double portable classroom was completed. This was used as a dormitory and the single portable class room was used as a school in place of the small summer house which had been previously in use as a temporary class room. This summer house is now used as a manual training room. In November 1923 a new block of buildings containing three dormitories each holding 20 beds, a corridor, a lobby and dressing room was completed. A new W.C. block, boys' bathroom and a laundry block were also completed. Other structural alterations in the existing buildings were affected at the same time thus giving splendid accommodation for 100 inmates. In October 1924 we installed another twenty five beds thus bringing the accommodation to 100 beds. In July 1925 a new domestic water supply was installed and in August 1925 a 70cm fire service with three fire hydrants was completed. Thus the school accommodation now stands at 100 with a staff consisting of superintendent, first assistant teacher, supervisor of domestic arrangements, two female attendants, a nightwatchman, two male attendants, a cook and a laundress general".

The Truant School was reserved for "confirmed and recalcitrant truants". The school was run like a boarding school, the boys living in dormitories and being schooled on site. The Child Welfare Department believed that its policy of sending "confirmed" truants to Guildford was, on the whole, successful. For example, in the years 1926 to 1929, between 13% and 16% of truants sent to the school returned after having been discharged. The department could argue that this meant over 80% of truants sent to the school were "cured" of their truancy. During these years, there was also a decrease in the number of truants admitted each year, but an increase in the number of residents at any one time.

During the Depression years, the Child Welfare Department recorded a substantial drop in rates of truancy across the State. This ran counter to expectations, which were that Depression would increase truancy rates. In explanation, the department believed that the presence of unemployed parents in the home was the principal cause for the drop in truancy. With parents at home, it was believed that there was more control over children's attendance at school, not to be found when one or both parents were absent from home in the workplace during the day. By 1931, the drop in overall truancy rates also translated into a drop in the number of residents and boys being admitted to the Truant School. At the end of 1931, there were 58 boys in residence at Linnwood. On average, most boys spent around 3 to 4 months at Linnwood.

The new dormitory building at the rear of Linnwood was constructed by the builder, Mr P. Cameron of Harris Park. The Dormitory additions were completed towards the end of 1923. A sketch plan, probably post 1923 as it indicates works proposed in 1921-22 and seemingly completed, illustrates the proposed location of new water pipes through Linnwood, servicing the bathroom next to the best bedroom, and the proposed bathroom in the hallway.

Each of the architectural plans from the early 1920s were prepared by the Department of Education architect, John Smart. The first preliminary plan for a new dormitory building at the rear of Linnwood was prepared at the beginning of 1919. A pavilion building linked to Linnwood via a covered way. Departmental officials regarded the proposal as "a high expenditure for a rented property". It would appear that this was the primary reason for delays in providing additional accommodation. By December 1920, a handwritten note to the 1919 architect's memo stated that "it has been decided to purchase this property for (Pounds)5,000". A significant impediment to capital works on the site was thus removed. The initial plans for a new dormitory were rapidly outdated and never implemented.

The desire for improved accommodation to meet the increasing needs of the school accelerated at the end of 1919, with a memorandum from Superintendent Dawson, requesting alterations to existing buildings, including a new door to the office (the former library), and laundry and bath accommodation attached to the gardener's residence. The alterations to the gardeners cottage for the baths and laundry were under construction in late 1919, thus pre-empting a more extensive package of works developed in 1921 and 1922, and implemented in 1923. A plan survives of proposals for a new door to the office, which proposed to use an existing external door from the sewing room.

In 1920, the superintendent wrote several times to the Chief Inspector, indicating that the present accommodation arrangements (including beds on the verandas) were insufficient, and calling for new accommodation to be constructed along the lines already proposed. Mr Dawson was insistent, and stated that the congestion "leaves no room for further admissions unless I follow the suicidal method of releasing boys before they are due, of which, I must confess, I have already been guilty".

The erection of the single and double portable classrooms commenced towards the end of 1921. A sketch plan of Linnwood in the 1922 bundle of papers presents an illustration of the existing floor plan of the building in its Truant School use. It illustrates the conversion of the building, with the dormitories located at the rear of the main building, with service rooms and staff quarters in the rear wings. A partition had been added in the middle of the hall. The superintendent's quarters were situated at the front, using the main bedroom and the drawing room. The McCredie' bathroom and dressing room had been converted to a "temporary bedroom" and bathroom with a partition installed. The dressing room at the rear on the North side appears to have been extended. This may therefore date after the 1922 plans for new works. The door to the office, the former library, had already been inserted.

On the basis of these plans, a report was prepared by the architect in November 1921, and acted upon in March 1922. The report noted that the existing dormitories within Linnwood were "inadequately ventilated and are very much overcrowded". The number of boys squeezed into each dormitory was only possible because the boys changed in a common dressing room, therefore "leaving the dormitories free from any furniture or fitments except the beds".

The report also notes that there was inadequate classroom space, only one classroom where there should be two. The report notes that a portable class room building was under construction at the time (1921), which was to be used at first as a temporary dormitory. It is also noted that there was an existing portable room on site, containing almost twice as many beds as it should. It was recommended that following provision of more dormitory space, this room should be converted to an "isolation dormitory".

The architect concluded that the existing building could not accommodate the present, or expected needs, of the Truant School, and that the recommended option was to construct a new dormitory building at the rear of Linnwood. The simple dormitories were designed to provide "ample windows and doors for light and air", and it was noted that "though rather crowded they would be much superior from a health point than the present dormitories of the existing main building".

The report notes that the office - the former library - required a public entrance to avoid people passing the Superintendent's quarters at the front of the building. It was proposed to alter a window to a doorway (see Fabric Survey). For similar reasons, it was proposed to install a screen in the hall to separate the residential quarter from the dormitories and visitors. The report goes on to note further requirements, including new lavatories and an extended dressing room, reversion to the original sewing room, conversion of the existing laundry in the rear wing to a store room and the construction of a new laundry near the drying area, and the provision of shower baths "in another large stable building". The existing shower baths were located in a detached building occupied by a teacher and his family (wife and three children), and were considered to be an intrusion on privacy, and discharged waste water to the ground nearby.

The final architect's certificate for completion of the works is dated November 1923. The architect's report also includes a list of variations to the proposed works.

A 1935 memorandum from the then superintendent Mr Kably to the Director of Education details the schedule of the boys at the time. Junior boys were in class during the mornings, until dinner at midday, then 1/2 hour playtime at l pm. From 1:30 to 3:30, the junior boys were engaged in gardening duties around the grounds under the supervision of an attendant. On Friday afternoons, the boys were engaged in darning and similar activities. The Senior boys were in class from 1:30 to 3:30 in the afternoons. In the mornings, the Senior boys were put to work from 9 to 11:15 in chores, such as "laundry work, scrubbing dining room or dormitories, window cleaning, or polishing". They did their gardening chores from 11:15 until dinner at midday. The memorandum notes that Linnwood had no maids, and so all domestic chores fell to the boys. At the suggestion of full-time schooling, the author made no objection, and noted that arrangements were already in place for full-time schooling for the junior boys, except Friday afternoons.

A 1927 Annual Financial return for the school notes that the school raised some income from the sale of calves, indicating that at least a part of the property was used for cattle breeding. A 1929 memorandum addressed the issue of failing admissions during the preceding years. The memorandum questioned whether the Metropolitan Children's Court was making full use of the Truant School, as overall truancy numbers had not declined.

During the 1930s at Linnwood, there were only just over a dozen boys at the school. Enrolments continued to drop in the 1930s, and by 1935, there were less than 20 boys at the school each week. In the summer break of 1935 to 1936, Superintendent Dawson took long service leave, and took a study tour of the UK and the United States, looking at schooling for "maladjusted" children. Mrs Dawson was in charge during her husband's absence. It was suggested that the school be closed. From Linnwood, Mr Dawson became Principal of the Pyrmont Adjustment School.

The Director of Education's report made reference to a report by Mr Dawson on the UK and US schools he examined, and his recommendation that problem boys, including truants, should not be going through the court system. The decision to close the school was also primarily a result of the dropping numbers. The remaining boys at the school were discharged on 29 November 1936, and the Guildford Truant School officially closed its doors in 1936. A female attendant continued as a caretaker after the school closed. On 28 November 1936, the Child Welfare Department took over the site for use as one of their institutions.

==== Domestic science training school for girls ====
Prior to opening Linnwood as a domestic science training school for female state wards, repairs were required, including renovation of the portable classrooms. Painting and repairs were required to the rooms of Linnwood, and heating needed to be installed. Converted in 1939 from the Truant school to a "residential domestic science school for female wards", Linnwood was home to 58 girls, from 12 to 15 years of age. The selection of residents was based upon those who were "unable to settle down in foster homes, or for other reasons are considered more suitable for the hostel type of life" at Linnwood. The 1961 Annual Report says that Linnwood included a school with a curriculum adapted to the "varying mental abilities and ages" of the girls. "Cooking, needlework and home management" were central to the curriculum, plus "special courses". The report notes that many girls passed public service and nursing examinations, and many were placed in "clerical position". The report also notes that the girls were taken on excursions outside the home, including to the theatre, movies, exhibitions, and picnics. Other activities included "ballet, drama and choral work and such handicrafts as embroidery, needlecraft and flower arrangement." Sporting activities included basketball, softball and swimming. The playing fields were located on the expanse of land to the front of the house (Oral History). The girls also had their own Girl Guides troop, and on at least one occasion hiked to Prospect (Oral History).

A departmental publication from 1966 describes the purpose and activities at "Lynwood Hall" at Guildford. The report notes that Linnwood was for girls aged from 12 to 15, from a deprived background. The report claims that "worthwhile goals are set and the girls are encouraged to meet them". In addition to a "general emphasis on domestic science", an emphasis was also placed on "deportment, courtesy and correct social conduct". The report notes that organisations such as Rotary and the C.W.A were responsible for providing outings for the girls and facilitating contact with the community (a picture of the Queen presented by the CWA hangs in the central hall). Other outings included trips to the city to see the ballet (Oral History). Ballet was apparently very important at Linnwood, and girls who performed well in classes were bound to be favourites of the staff (Oral History).

In Departmental literature, Lynwood Hall was described as a "home science training establishment", but which also "develops special courses where necessary for girls proposing to take up employment in particular avenues, e.g., commercial and industrial business and nursing". Life at Linnwood, as described by former residents, appears to have been either harsh or rewarding, or both at different times and for different people. Punishments carried out at Linnwood varied depending upon the misdemeanour. Perhaps the most dreaded, was to be locked in the "klink", the small, narrow room beside the laundry at the rear of the additions to Linnwood. The window was boarded up, and the room was used as a place of solitary confinement (Oral History). Alternatively, girls who had misbehaved were made to scrub the tiled veranda floors, or the main hall, or the large dining area at the rear of the building. Another punishment was being forbidden to speak to the other girls for a period of time (Oral History).

Activities for the girls at Linnwood included gardening. Plots were allocated and the best kept gardens were rewarded with prizes. The girls, like the boys before them, were also responsible for cooking. The girls were divided into groups, and each took turns to cook the meals and serve them (Oral History). Of the two kitchens at Linnwood, one was used for cooking lessons (Oral History). Another day was set aside for washing (Oral History). The girls attended school on the remaining three days. Weekends were recognised, and these were the days for outings and activities. Staff never addressed the girls by their first name according to accounts. Surnames were commonly used, which was not atypical for any boarding school environment of the time, however, accounts are that girls were also often referred to by a number only. (Oral History).

On 12 July 1956, Linnwood was extensively damaged by a fire. Former girls remember the fire starting in the rear kitchen, and then spreading from there and through the roof. The interior of the principal rooms within Linnwood itself do not appear to have been directly affected. Newspaper reports of the fire mention the girls carrying furniture, bedding, clothes and crockery from Linnwood to the front lawn, and also trying to help put out the fire with hoses. Assistance was provided by local residents until the arrival of the district fire brigades. The reports confirm that the fire started at the back of the house, extensively damaging the kitchen and dining area, and then spread principally through the roof. The Dormitory building was apparently undamaged, and was to be used for accommodation until the main building was repaired (SMH).

McCredie cottage was opened on 17 July 1970, to accommodate 26 preschool aged children, all wards of the State. A departmental report states that the building was the "first cottage home to be specially designed and constructed for preschool children". The report contained the following description of the philosophy behind the design of the building: "The needs of the children have received special consideration in the architecture, such that the home, which is in fact quite extensive, never gives the impression to its true size "proportions and perspective have been so designed that no child will feel overawed or dwarfed by the establishment."

McCredie cottage also comprised a self-contained flat for senior female wards, who would assist in the care of the children, and at the same time receive experience for future employment as live-in child care workers.

Resident numbers at Linnwood Hall during the late sixties to early seventies, was within the range of 30 to 50 residents. McCredie cottage housed 26 to 28 children at any one time. Though Linnwood for example housed on average around 40 residents at a time, during the year more than twice that number were admitted, half of whom were discharged within a twelve-month period. At McCredie cottage, the total number of admissions each year was about triple the average number of residents at a time. The Annual Report also states that the children at McCredie were there only until such a time as they could be placed in foster homes (p. 55). The opening of McCredie had assisted in reducing the demand at other facilities. (p. 9)

At the end of the 1970s, McCredie cottage was adapted to also cater for children up to the age of 8. Faulds House was opened on 23 April 1976. It was designed to provide accommodation for girls who were of primary and high school age, and attended local schools. The intention, according to the department, was to provide "a family type setting with minimum restrictions" The report also noted that upon opening Faulds House, Linnwood was closed and renovated, "to be reopened as a hostel for working age girl wards".

Married couples were in charge of Faulds. Some girls would stay at Faulds until transferred into foster homes. Others who stayed at Faulds continued in schooling to School Certificate level.

In 1977, Linnwood was described as a "Group House" by the department. In the 1980s, Linnwood was used as a hostel for State Wards up to the age of 16. There was room at this time for 16 wards in the building, male and female. They paid for their board, and were given a degree of independence. The aim of the managers was to teach the teenagers to cope on their own, and an emphasis was placed on teaching living skills (1984 Newspaper Article).

In 1991, a reunion was held at Linnwood, attended by 75 former residents. In later years (e.g. 1995), Linnwood was used by the Auburn/Holroyd Disability Services Branch of the Department of Community Services. In 1996, it was noted that no children had lived in Linnwood itself for three years (1993). In 1996, staff and students from Minali, another DOCS home, were relocated to Linnwood, as well as an Education department "assessment and tutorial service and an outreach and aftercare service".

=== Linnwood Museum ===
In 1984, a plan to provide a museum at Linnwood was advertised. On 21 March 1985, The Department of Community Services granted a license to the Holroyd and District Historical Society, to operate the "Linnwood Museum", from the building. In September of that year, the museum was officially opened by the then Minister for Youth and Community Services, Frank Walker.

The Friends of Linnwood Hall was formed in 2002 following a successful community campaign to save it from being sold and redeveloped by the NSW Department of Education. The group has since raised $200,000 towards restoration works for the historic house.

In January 2002 Minister Yeadon announced that control of the property would be transferred to the NSW Heritage Office. A steering committee was formed with representatives from the Heritage Office, Heritage Council, Holroyd City Council and the community. Control of the whole site was transferred to the Heritage Office on 30 June 2002 (Draft CMP: Linnwood.

Holroyd City Council debated handing back control of Linnwood Hall to the state government in November–December 2015, after a proposal to subdivide the land and use sale proceeds to fund its restoration have been stalled. Council will proceed with plans to subdivide the land and use proceeds from the Tamplin Road Reserve sale towards restoration of Linnwood house, following a series of meetings with the Heritage Division to address long-running delays.

== Description ==
Setting

Linnwood Hall is located in Holroyd, south of Guildford. The residence sits high on a north–south running ridge within spacious grounds of about 5.113 hectares (12.63 acres) with mature trees. Several other early elements from the initial phase of development of the property are evident within this curtilage including an unusual octagonal summerhouse, several mature trees and fountains.

The original entrance is marked by substantial chamfered timber gate posts with unusual cast iron orb finials. The accompanying concrete post, pipe rail and wire mesh fence probably dates from the early 20th century. The drive is now bitumen paved.

A long winding gravel driveway leads to Linnwood house which is built on rising ground. The gardens were at one time extensively landscaped and featured water fountains, summer house, schoolroom and a hall where church services for the small township of Guildford were held.

The site retains many early tree plantings (including Araucaria cunninghamii/hoop pines, camphor laurels), garden layout (including the entrance drive, garden features such as outbuildings, an iron fountain and the iron railing fence to street), large plantings (such as giant bamboo (Bambusa balcooa) remain, along with later plantings from the 20th century such as a grove of eucalypts along the entrance drive.

A sinuous curved drive leads to the main house from Byron Road running close to the site's northern boundary. This drive is lined with mature Eucalypts (many lemon scented gums, Corymbia citriodora (syn. Eucalyptus citriodora) (mid 20th century plantings) and some older trees including Canary Island palms (Phoenix canariensis), black bean (Castanospermum australe), camphor laurels (Cinnamomum camphora), coral trees (Erythrina spp.), Himalayan or deodar cedar (Cedrus deodara), brush box (Lophostemon confertus), African olive (Olea africana), mulberry (Morus alba), firewheel tree (Stenocarpus sinuatus), hoop pine (Araucaria cunninghamii), crepe myrtle (Lagerstroemia indica), plums (Prunus cerasifera cv.s). Shrubs include hibiscus (H.rosa-sinensis), frangipani (Plumeria rubra), jade bush (Portulacaria afra), Himalayan jasmine (Jasminium mesnyii), Photinia glabra (popular hedge species), Cape honeysuckle or tecoma (Tecomaria capensis) (also a popular hedge species), 2 species of privet, (Ligustrum ovalifolium and L.vulgare), and herbaceous plants Indian shot (Canna indica), red hot pokers (Kniphofia spp.) and Adam's bayonet (Yucca gloriosa).

Structures

There are four primary building structures located on the property.

- McCredie c. 1971 is located to the south east on the front boundary of the property;
- Linnwood Hall is predominately at the centre of the property. It is a large single storey Italianate style villa residence. It features separately roofed verandahs to the front (east) and side (north and south) elevations. The central main entry on the front elevation is marked by a small hipped portico breaking the line of the skillion roof verandah in the centre of the elevation. The portico is accessed via a small flight of rendered masonry steps. The portico is flanked by French windows and segmented projecting bays. The building is constructed of rendered masonry and features flanking bays at the ends of the verandahs and french doors. The main roof is hipped and of slate, some parts are clad with corrugated iron. A feature to be noted are the stained glass windows and doors in the main house. The interior features much intact original fabric and detailing, including stained glass windows imported from England, set plaster walls and ceilings and timber floors;
- Isaacs is located to the west of Linnwood Hall; and
- Faulds c. 1976 is located on the south of the property.

Each building is constructed of a combination of brick, concrete and timber.

Other structures includes two swimming pools located on the property, the first located in front of Linnwood Hall, the second immediately behind McCredie Cottage. Both are covered with sheet iron supported by a timber structure.

=== Condition ===
As at 6 March 2002, historic photographs show intensively developed grounds with ornamental flower beds, statues, fountains and gravel drives or paths. Because most of the old garden area is now covered by lawn, it is likely to have been little disturbed and therefore has high archaeological potential to retain evidence of the early landscaping. Areas within the main building which are likely to have archaeological potential include underfloor and foundation areas, wall cavities and roof spaces. Where deposits have not been removed by subsequent disturbance or misadventure (building works, repairs, etc.) they may be expected to yield information relevant to the original construction and occupation of the building.

Many early tree plantings (including Araucarias, camphor laurels), garden layout (including entrance drive, and garden features such as outbuildings, an iron fountain, iron railing fence to street), large plantings (such as giant bamboo) remain, along with later plantings from the 20th century such as a grove of eucalypts along the entrance drive. Such a relatively intact large urban garden retaining early structure, plantings and detail is increasingly rare today. The fencing which borders most of the property is considerably deteriorated and the property generally has been poorly maintained in recent years. The main gate posts remain although their paint is peeling off and in poor condition. Much of the building and curtilage are intact. Grounds include many original elements. Modifications are reversible.

=== Modifications and dates ===
The main residence has been adaptively re-used over many years to provide institutional care facilities for live-in clients of the Department of Community Services. There has been some intervention in original fabric of the residence, however, it is not irreversible.

On 17 March 2011 the Minister approved creation of two Crown Reserves over the Linnwood Hall Estate. One contains all buildings and heritage cartilage and will be managed by Holroyd Council. The other covers the open space fronting Tamplin Road, will be managed by the Land and Property Management Authority (LPMA).

== Heritage listing ==
As at 14 November 2007, Linnwood, including its associated buildings and landscape, is of state significance as a welfare site that was in operation and use for over 80 years. Since 1917, the site was continually adapted and developed specifically for various welfare uses such as housing and educating state wards. Of particular significance is the use of Linnwood as the first and only Truant School that was in existence in NSW between 1917 and 1936 and was later used by the Department of Welfare as a Girls Home Science Domestic School for state wards.

Linwood is also significant as an example of a prominent and wealthy city businessman's country retreat that was constructed on a large estate beyond the then outskirts of Sydney. The size and fine detail of this late Victorian residence demonstrates the wealth, aspirations and lifestyle of this class in society.

Specifically, Linnwood is in part representative of its original designer and occupier George McCredie. George McCredie was prominent for a time in the local community through his involvement in the political arena and in community activities. On a broader level George McCredie is known historically for his role in conducting the cleansing of The Rocks following the outbreak of the bubonic plague in 1900, and the building activities of his family firm A.L. & G. McCredie and Sons. The remnant of Linwood estate can still demonstrate by its scale within its urban setting the former extent of the land holdings of Susan McCredie, who was also a prominent local figure in her own right.

Linnwood was listed on the New South Wales State Heritage Register on 21 February 2003 having satisfied the following criteria.

The place is important in demonstrating the course, or pattern, of cultural or natural history in New South Wales.

Linnwood is significant as a late 19th century country retreat constructed by a prosperous city businessman demonstrating a pattern of land use that occurred during this time beyond the outskirts of Sydney. Linnwood is historically representative of the wealth and aspirations of this class of Late Victorian Sydney self made men, and also demonstrates the extensive local landholdings of Susan McCredie.

From 1917 to 1936 Linnwood was the first and only Truant School to exist in NSW. It is representative of a period in the history of NSW Education practice when truancy was a prevalent problem in government run schools. The recognition of this problem is in part due to the regulation of school attendance as part of the Public Instruction Amendment Act 1916. At this time truancy was considered an anti-social activity, that if not curtailed would eventually lead to delinquency. The Guildford Truant School at Linnwood was part of the Department of Education's attempt to rectify this problem.

Linnwood is associated with state organised welfare activities in NSW. The Truant School, the Domestic Science School and McCredie Cottage Child Care Centre, Faulds House, as well as other, more recent welfare uses, demonstrate a continuous use of the site for these purposes for over 80 years. It is associated with the practice of the NSW government to educate female wards in domestic practices thereby preparing them for the adult world.

The place has a strong or special association with a person, or group of persons, of importance of cultural or natural history of New South Wales's history.

Linnwood Hall is associated with George McCredie, a significant figure in the cultural history of the local area, and to a lesser extent of NSW.

As a mayor of the local municipality, state parliamentary member for the local Cumberland electorate and for his heavy and enthusiastic involvement in community affairs of the Guildford area including the Presbyterian Church and the Guildford Cricket Club, George McCredie was a prominent citizen in the local area between 1890 and 1903. His wife, Susan McCredie, was also a prominent member of the community, and maintained a respected profile in the local area after George McCredie's death.

George McCredie is significantly associated with the history of NSW primarily through his management and action of cleansing The Rocks area in Sydney following the outbreak of the bubonic plague in 1900. George McCredie was contracted by the city to carry out the cleansing process which included the resumption of many buildings in the area, the cleaning of drains and sewers and catching and destroying rats. George McCredie's photographic records of The Rocks cleansing is an invaluable state significant historical resource.

George McCredie and his company A.L. & G. McCredie & Sons, Architects and Consulting Engineers, were responsible or associated with the construction of many of Sydney's prominent buildings such as George Patterson House, the Burns Phillip Building, Mark Foys, and many of the former wharves in Darling Harbour. The firm was also responsible for the laying of the first underground telephone lines through tunnels beneath Sydney's streets and pavements.

Linnwood and the associated buildings on the site are significant for their association with the large number of state wards and truants that resided, and were schooled there, between the years of 1917 and 1999, notably the gangster Chow Hayes.

The place is important in demonstrating aesthetic characteristics and/or a high degree of creative or technical achievement in New South Wales.

Linnwood is a reasonably well preserved example of a late Victorian country retreat constructed by a prosperous Sydney businessman. The house, constructed in a slightly Italianate style, featured quality internal decoration and pleasure gardens displaying the high aspirations of the McCredies. The size, construction and detail (internal and external) of the dwelling give it considerable architectural significance in the local area.

McCredie Cottage is a purpose designed building that makes it significant for its demonstration of the architect's intention, and the prevalent "Sydney School" of design at the time. Originally designed to house pre-school age state wards, the cottage was designed to be of a smaller, non threatening scale so that children would be more comfortable in their own environment.

Linnwood Hall and its grounds has, since the period of construction, exhibited and retained landmark qualities in the local area due to the aesthetic character of the dwelling and it associated landscape.

The place has a strong or special association with a particular community or cultural group in New South Wales for social, cultural or spiritual reasons.

Linnwood Hall, particularly its grounds, are socially significant to the local Guildford community for the continuing association of the site with the local community through its use for community and social activities. Presently the community responds to Linnwood and the site for its aesthetic and landmark qualities, and views it as a valuable community resource.

Linnwood Hall is associated with numerous groups of children and state wards who lived, were schooled, and worked at the site at various times. Linnwood contributes to the identity of this diverse community, and significantly impacted their lives.

The place has potential to yield information that will contribute to an understanding of the cultural or natural history of New South Wales.

Linnwood and its surrounding landscape is evidence of the use and moulding of the landscape to create a country estate. The site provides evidence of this pattern of land use in the local area. McCredie Cottage and Faulds House are evidence of purpose designed welfare dwellings. McCredie cottage is particularly significant as it was designed specifically for the preschool age children that would inhabit it.

Linnwood is evidence of the conversion of a late Victorian residence for specific welfare and education uses such as the Truant School and the Domestic Science School.

Linnwood is evidence of a "welfare site" that was continually adapted over the course of eighty years in order to meet specific use requirements in regards to the housing and education of particular groups of state wards in NSW.

The site is likely to have a high level of archaeological potential, owing to a limited degree of site disturbance. The demolished remains of the original stables and cottage at the South West corner of the site are likely to be fairly undisturbed. The site is also likely to reveal evidence of former paths, outbuilding, drains, waste disposal, gardens and fences. There is a remote possibility that the footings of the 1894 Linnwood Hall church may be located in the vicinity of the Western boundary of the site. The significance of archaeological remains on the site is relative to the overall significance of the property.

The place possesses uncommon, rare or endangered aspects of the cultural or natural history of New South Wales.

Linnwood, as an example of a late Victorian country retreat constructed by a prosperous city businessman, is a rare survivor in the local area.

The use of Linnwood as a Truant School is rare in NSW. The Guildford Truant School was the only one of its kind in the history of NSW education/welfare.

The continual use, development and adaptation of the site for various welfare and education purposes, for over 80 years, is rare in the history of NSW.

The place is important in demonstrating the principal characteristics of a class of cultural or natural places/environments in New South Wales.

Linnwood is a reasonably intact representative example of a late Victorian residence constructed in a slightly Italianate style, as a country home.

Faulds House and McCredie Cottage are representative of the use of the site for specific welfare purposes, and of the Sydney School of architecture translated into Government institutional buildings.

== See also ==
- Australian residential architectural styles
