= September 1889 Central Cumberland colonial by-election =

By-election in New South Wales, Australia

A by-election was held for the New South Wales Legislative Assembly electorate of Central Cumberland on 28 September 1889 because of the resignation of Frank Farnell (Free Trade) due to bankruptcy.

== Dates ==
Date	Event
19 September 1889	Frank Farnell resigned.
20 September 1889	Writ of election issued by the Speaker of the Legislative Assembly.
23 September 1889	Frank Farnell made bankrupt on his own petition.
28 September 1889	Nominations
5 October 1889	Polling day from 8 am until 4 pm.
12 October 1889	Return of writ

== Result ==
1889 Central Cumberland by-election Saturday 28 September
Party	Candidate	Votes	%	±%
Free Trade	Frank Farnell (elected)	unopposed		
Free Trade hold				

== See also ==
- Electoral results for the district of Central Cumberland
- List of New South Wales state by-elections
