= James Atkinson (Australian politician) =

Australian politician

James Henry Atkinson (c. 1820 – 31 August 1873) was an English-born Australian politician.

Though his exact date of birth is unknown, it is estimated to have been around 1820 in the city of Wakefield in the county of Yorkshire. He ran a wool washing works at Botany Swamps before erecting a dam at Lachlan Swamps around 1849. He later expanded to become a fellmonger. In 1859 he was elected to the New South Wales Legislative Assembly for Central Cumberland, serving until his resignation due to insolvency in 1863. Atkinson died at Newtown in 1873.

New South Wales Legislative Assembly
New seat	Member for Central Cumberland; 1859–1863; Served alongside: John Laycock	Succeeded by Allan Macpherson
