= Robertson ministry (1877) =

Fourth New South Wales government ministry led by John Robertson

Fourth Robertson ministry
- 17th Cabinet of the Colony of New South Wales

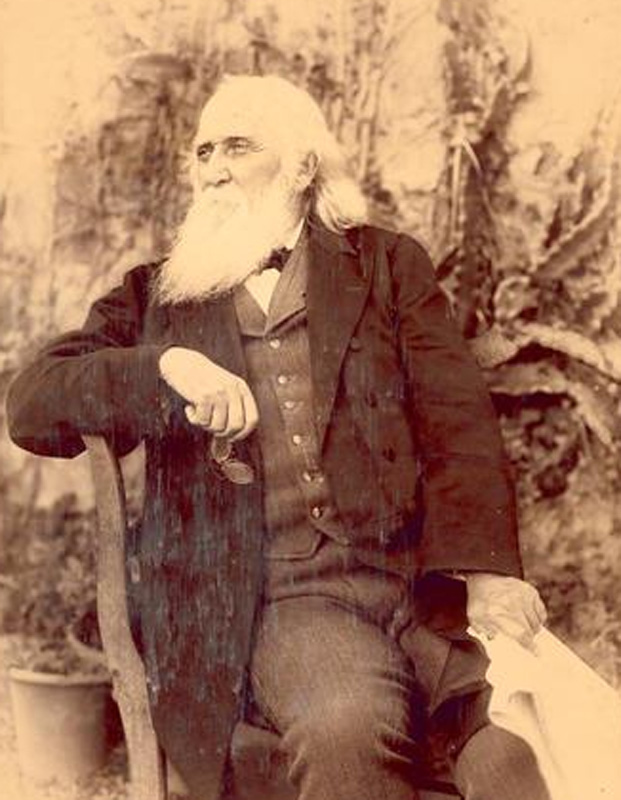
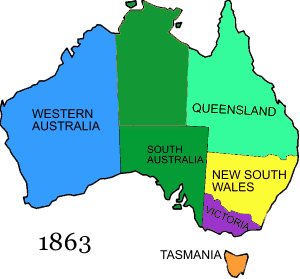
- Premier Sir John Robertson and the Colony of New South Wales (1863–1900)
- Date formed: 17 August 1877
- Date dissolved: 17 November 1877

People and organisations
- Monarch: Queen Victoria
- Governor: Sir Hercules Robinson
- Head of government: Sir John Robertson
- No. of ministers: 9
- Member party: unaligned
- Status in legislature: Minority government
- Opposition party: unaligned
- Opposition leader: Henry Parkes; James Farnell

History
- Outgoing election: 1877
- Predecessor: Second Parkes ministry
- Successor: Farnell ministry

The fourth Robertson ministry was the seventeenth ministry of the Colony of New South Wales, and was led by Sir John Robertson. It was the fourth of five occasions that Robertson led the Government. Robertson was elected in the first free elections for the New South Wales Legislative Assembly held in March 1856.

The title of Premier was widely used to refer to the Leader of Government, but not enshrined in formal use until 1920.

There was no party system in New South Wales politics until 1887. The 1874–75 election had resulted in a challenging environment. Robertson was the leader of the government until March 1877 when he was unable to obtain supply and resigned, replaced by Henry Parkes. The Parkes government however only lasted until 16 August 1877, when Parkes was in turn unable to obtain supply and resigned to be replaced by Robertson.

Under the constitution, ministers were required to resign to recontest their seats in a by-election when appointed. Such ministerial by-elections were usually uncontested however on this occasion a by-election was required for West Sydney (Sir John Robertson), East Sydney (John Davies), Orange (Edward Combes) and Central Cumberland (John Lackey and William Long). Each minister was comfortably re-elected. Only Thomas Garrett (Camden) and Ezekiel Baker (Goldfields South) were re-elected unopposed.

Garrett had a disagreement with Robertson on the question of the Land Bill and resigned in October, however the resignation was not accepted until 19 November 1877. Garrett was succeeded by Baker, with Archibald Jacob replacing Baker as Secretary for Mines. A by-election was required for The Lower Hunter, but Jacob was comfortably re-elected.

This ministry covers the period from 17 August 1877 until 17 December 1877, when Robertson did not achieve a majority at the December 1877 election. Parkes did not obtain a majority either and the subsequent government was formed by James Farnell as a compromise Premier.

== Composition of ministry ==
Portfolio	Minister	Term start	Term end	Term length
Premier; Colonial Secretary	Sir John Robertson	17 August 1877	17 December 1877	122 days
Colonial Treasurer	William Long	17 August 1877	17 December 1877	122 days
Minister of Justice and Public Instruction	John Lackey	17 August 1877	17 December 1877	122 days
Secretary for Lands	Thomas Garrett	17 August 1877	19 November 1877	94 days
Secretary for Lands	Ezekiel Baker	20 November 1877	17 December 1877	27 days
Secretary for Mines	Ezekiel Baker	17 August 1877	19 November 1877	94 days
Secretary for Mines	Archibald Jacob	20 November 1877	17 December 1877	27 days
Secretary for Public Works	Edward Combes	17 August 1877	17 December 1877	122 days
Attorney General	William Dalley MLC	17 August 1877	17 December 1877	122 days
Postmaster-General	John Davies	17 August 1877	17 December 1877	122 days
Vice-President of the Executive Council; Representative of the Government in Legislative Council	Joseph Docker MLC	17 August 1877	17 December 1877	122 days

Ministers were members of the Legislative Assembly unless otherwise noted.

== See also ==
  - Members of Parliament
  - 1874–1877 Legislative Assembly
  - Legislative Council
  - Robertson ministries
  - First (1860–1861)
  - Second (1868–1870)
  - Third (1875–77)
  - Fifth (1885–1886)

Preceded by Second Parkes ministry	Fourth Robertson ministry 1877	Succeeded by Farnell ministry
