= Andrew McCulloch (politician) =

Politician and solicitor from New South Wales, Australia

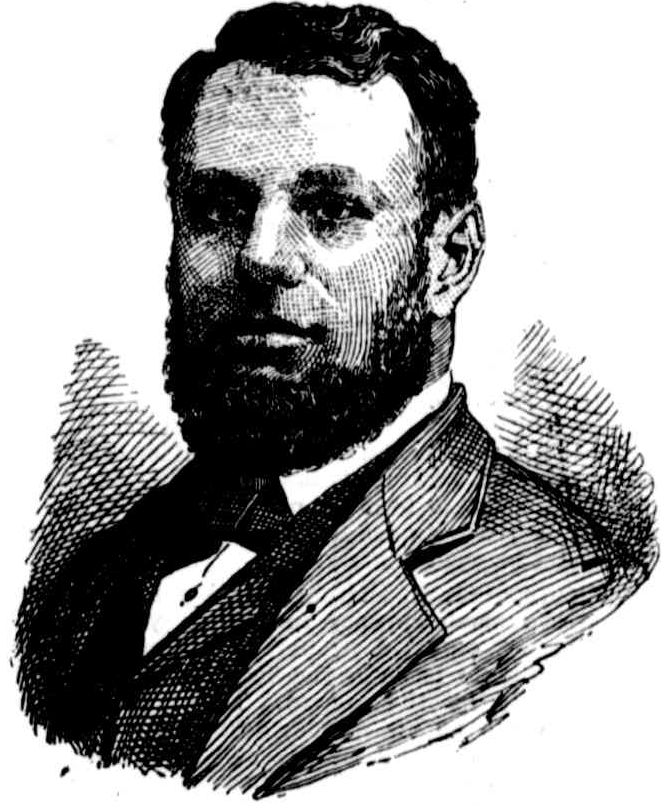

Andrew Hardie McCulloch (1844 or 1845 – 8 May or 28 May 1908) was an Australian solicitor and politician.

His father was a squatter and solicitor also called Andrew Hardie McCulloch and his mother was Elizabeth (née Griffin), but further details of his birth are unknown.

He was a Sydney solicitor, having been admitted in November 1867, and also a pastoralist with runs near Canonbar. He was elected to the New South Wales Legislative Assembly for Central Cumberland at the 1877 election. He held the seat until financial difficulty forced him to resign it in December 1887. He regained the seat at the resulting by-election, however financial difficulty caused him to resign again in May 1888. He announced his intention to recontest the seat at the May 1888 by-election, however he decided not to stand.

He was struck off the roll of solicitors on 29 May 1888.

The Parliament of New South Wales records his date of death as 8 May 1908, however the death notice published in The Argus lists McCulloch as dying at Hawthorn on 28 May 1908, aged 63 years.

New South Wales Legislative Assembly
Preceded by John Lackey; William Long	Member for Central Cumberland; 1877 – 1888; With: John Lackey / Varney Parkes / John Nobbs none / Nathaniel Bull / Frank Farnell	Succeeded by David Buchanan
