= George McCredie =

Politician from New South Wales, Australia

George McCredie (1 January 1859 – 4 February 1903) was an Australian politician.

He was born at Pyrmont, New South Wales, Australia and attended Fort Street Public School before becoming an apprentice carpenter at the age of fourteen. He worked in northern Queensland for the Australasian Steam Navigation Company before returning to Sydney to work as a consulting engineer. After a world tour in 1883, he lived at Guildford by 1891, becoming an alderman on Prospect and Sherwood Municipal Council, and was the mayor from 4 February 1892 until 20 February 1895.

During 1891 he designed and built Linnwood, his home at Guildford. He was elected to the New South Wales Legislative Assembly as a Free Trade member for Central Cumberland at the 1893 by-election. Central Cumberland, along with other multi-member districts, was abolished in 1894 and McCredie stood as the Free Trade candidate for Granville at the 1894 election but an independent free trade candidate, John Nobbs, split the Free Trade vote and both were defeated.

McCredie was the foreman of the jury in the trial of George Dean in which Dean was convicted of attempting to murder his wife. Dean was pardoned after a Royal Commission, but subsequently confessed and was convicted of perjury.

When bubonic plague struck Sydney in 1900, George McCredie was appointed by the Government to take charge of all quarantine activities in the Sydney area, beginning work on 23 March 1900. At the time of his appointment, McCredie was an architect and consulting engineer with offices in the Mutual Life of New York Building in Martin Place. McCredie's appointment was much criticised in Parliament, though it was agreed later that his work was successful. In 1900 McCredie was presented with a 'Victor of the Plague' commemorative shield.

McCredie died at Guildford on 4 February 1903 (aged 44), leaving a widow and eight children.

Civic offices
Preceded by Thomas Muston	Mayor of Prospect and Sherwood; 1892–1895	Succeeded by William Noller
New South Wales Legislative Assembly
Preceded by John Nobbs	Member for Central Cumberland; 1893–1894; Served alongside: Dale, Farnell, Garrard	Abolished
