= Frank Farnell =

Australian politician (1861–1929)

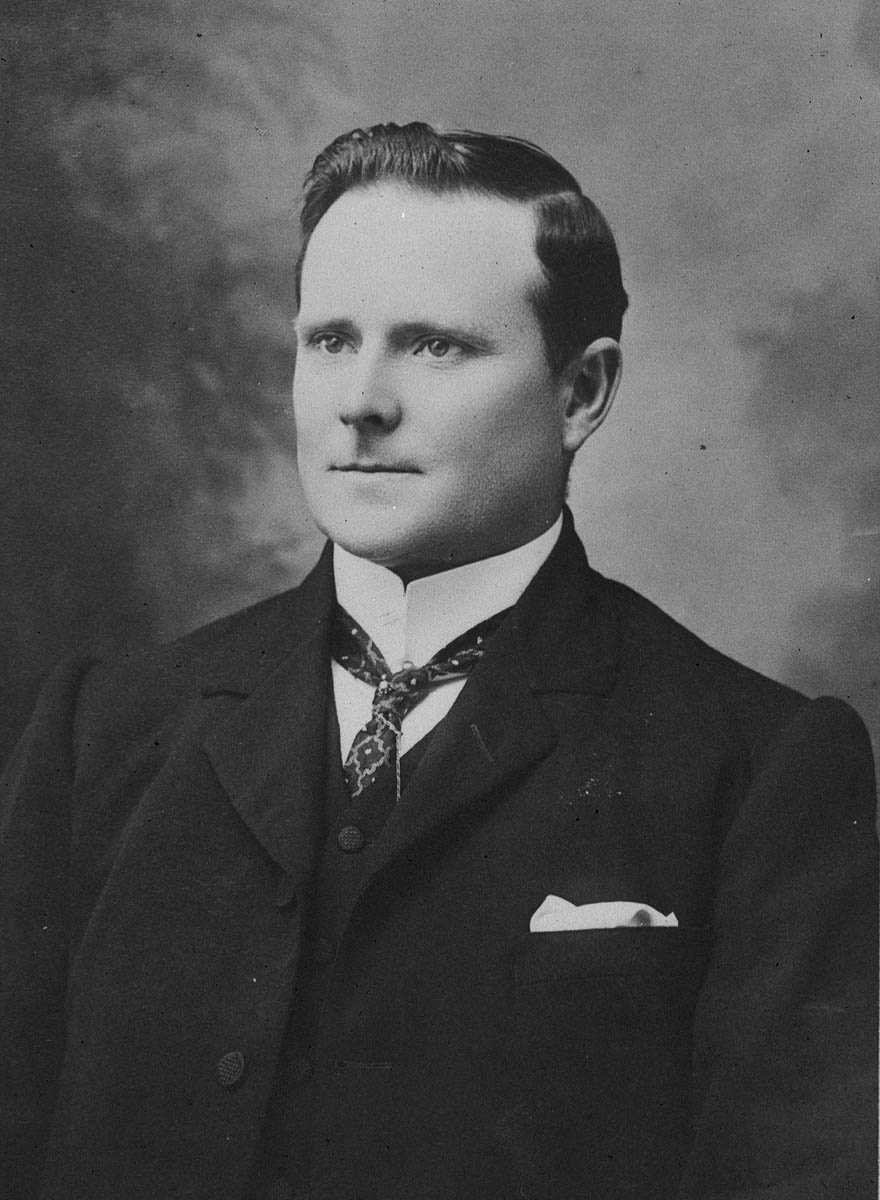

Frank Farnell (10 September 1861 – 16 July 1929) was a member of the New South Wales Legislative Assembly representing Central Cumberland and Ryde for the Free Trade Party.

== Early life ==
Farnell was born in the Sydney suburb of Ryde, the son of James Farnell, a NSW politician who would briefly become Premier of New South Wales from December 1877 until December 1878. He was educated at Newington College.

== Career ==
He worked as a clerk for commercial merchants before joining the railway department in 1880. Farnell then went into business selling tea, wine and spirits in the firm Allen, Bowden & Farnell.

== Parliament ==
In 1885 Farnell followed his father into politics, unsuccessfully standing for Central Cumberland at the 1885 election. He was successful on his second attempt at the 1887 election. and again at the 1889 election. In 1889 he was forced to resign due to financial difficulties, but was re-elected unopposed at the by-election, holding the seat in 1891 election.

The four member district of Central Cumberland was abolished in 1894 and Farnell was elected for Ryde, holding the seat until defeated at the 1898 election. Farnell regained the seat at the 1901 election. He resigned in December 1903 to accept the position of chairman of the Fisheries Board.

Farnell was unsuccessful at three further attempts at parliament, Bondi (1913), Drummoyne (1916), and North Shore (1920). He declined an appointment to the Legislative Council in 1917.

== Death ==
Farnell died in North Sydney on 16 July 1929 (aged 67).

New South Wales Legislative Assembly
Preceded by Nathaniel Bull	Member for Central Cumberland; 1887–1894; With: McCulloch/Buchanan/Ritchie/Garrard; Parkes/Nobbs/McCredie none/Linsley/Dale	District abolished
New district	Member for Ryde; 1894–1898	Succeeded by Edward Terry
Preceded by Edward Terry	Member for Ryde; 1901–1903	Succeeded by Edward Terry
