= Samuel Lyons (Australian politician) =

Australian politician

Samuel Lyons (9 June 1826 – 25 August 1910) was an Australian politician.

He was the younger son of auctioneer, landowner and businessman Samuel Lyons (1791-1851) and Mary Murphy ( -1832), and attended the University of Liège and Cambridge University. On 24 March 1853 Lyons married Charlotte Margaret Fuller at St James' Church, Sydney, and they had three sons and a daughter.

Lyons took over his father's enterprises on his father's death in 1851, and was a respected businessman and property owner. He was elected to the New South Wales Legislative Assembly for Canterbury at the 1859 election, but retired in 1860. He stood again for Canterbury at the December 1864 election, but was unsuccessful. He returned to the Legislative Assembly as the member for Central Cumberland at the 1868 by-election, but retired again in 1869.

Lyons died at Leura on 25 August 1910 (aged 84).

New South Wales Legislative Assembly
New district	Member for Canterbury; 1859–1860; Served alongside: Edward Flood	Succeeded by John Lucas; Edward Raper
Preceded by Allan Macpherson	Member for Central Cumberland; 1868–1869; Served alongside: John Lackey	Succeeded by Edward Flood
