= David Dale (Australian politician) =

Australian politician

David Dale (7 December 1843 – 22 May 1901) was an Australian politician.

He was born at Dural to farmer John Dale and Mary Williams. He was a brewer before entering politics, and also served as an alderman at Fairfield. He married twice: first, in Sydney in 1866, to Margaret MacDonald; and second, on 23 September 1876, to Marion Bertha Cox. Neither marriage produced children. In 1889 he was elected to the New South Wales Legislative Assembly as the Free Trade member for Central Cumberland. Re-elected in 1891, he retired due to poor health in 1894 and pursued pastoral interests in the northern rivers. He died at Fairfield in 1901.

New South Wales Legislative Assembly
Preceded by John Linsley	Member for Central Cumberland; 1889–1894; Served alongside: Farnell, Nobbs/McCredie, Ritchie/Garrard	Abolished
