= Nathaniel Bull =

Australian politician

Nathaniel George Bull (17 July 1842 – 7 November 1911) was an Australian politician.

He was born at Cabramatta to farmer John Bull and Mary Robinson. He became a draper at the age of fourteen, eventually running his own store from 1862. On 9 February 1861 he married Harriet Hordern, with whom he had thirteen children. He retired from storekeeping in 1875, although he would later return to business. In 1885 he was elected to the New South Wales Legislative Assembly for Central Cumberland, but he was defeated in 1887. Bull died at Potts Point in 1911.

New South Wales Legislative Assembly
Preceded by John Lackey	Member for Central Cumberland; 1885–1887; Served alongside: Andrew McCulloch, Varney Parkes	Succeeded by Frank Farnell
