= Robert Ritchie (Australian politician) =

Scottish-born Australian politician (1836–1891)

Robert Adam Ritchie (18 October 1836 – 16 August 1891) was a Scottish-born Australian politician.

He was born at Paisley in Renfrewshire to dyer John Ritchie and Barbara Henderson. In 1848 his family followed his elder brother to Sydney, and Ritchie worked at a woodmill in Parramatta managed by his father. He spent eighteen months at the Turon goldfields before becoming an apprentice blacksmith. In 1857 he took over the family business, and opened a new branch at Wickham, also merging with a Clyde-based firm. He retired from the business in 1884. On 25 March 1859 he married Jemima Fergus Douglas, with whom he had four children. After her death he remarried Clara Henderson, her sister, and had a further seven children.

A Parramatta alderman, Ritchie was elected to the New South Wales Legislative Assembly in 1889 as the member for Central Cumberland. A Free Trader, he was re-elected in 1891 but died at Auburn shortly afterwards.

New South Wales Legislative Assembly
Preceded by Frank Farnell; John Nobbs; David Buchanan	Member for Central Cumberland; 1889–1891; With: Frank Farnell; John Nobbs; John Linsley / David Dale	Succeeded by Jacob Garrard
