= John Linsley (politician) =

Australian politician

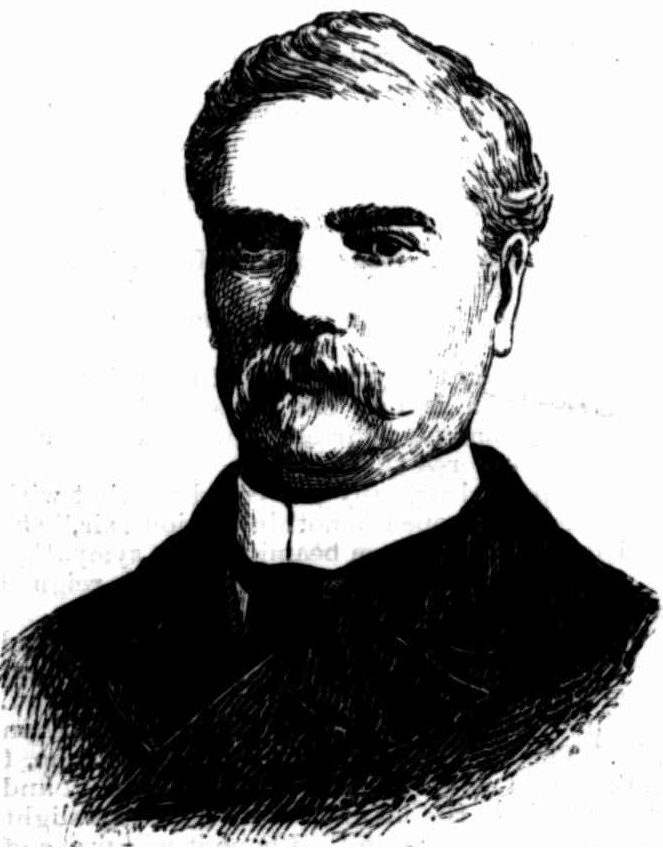
John Linsley, MLA for Central Cumberland

John Richard Linsley (30 May 1826 – 4 June 1889) was an Australian politician.

He was born at Windsor to tinman John Richard Linsley and Elizabeth Clarke. He was a successful merchant and butcher, and served as mayor of Ryde and on Sydney Municipal Council. In 1846 he married Mary Anne Ackerman, and on 24 May 1860 married Agnes Orr, with whom he had a son. In 1889 he was elected to the New South Wales Legislative Assembly as a Free Trade member for Central Cumberland, but he died less than six months later at Parramatta.

New South Wales Legislative Assembly
Preceded by David Buchanan	Member for Central Cumberland; 1889; Served alongside: Frank Farnell, John Nobbs, Robert Ritchie	Succeeded by David Dale
