= John Nobbs =

Australian politician

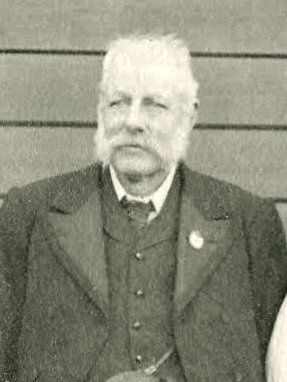
John Nobbs (1912)

John Nobbs (8 September 1845 – 11 November 1921) was an Australian politician. Between 1885 and 1888 he served in two periods as mayor of the Borough of Granville to the west of Sydney. He was the first mayor of Granville. From 1888 to 1893 and from 1898 to 1913 he represented the Free Trade Party, respectively the Liberal Reform Party as a member in the parliament of New South Wales. He was also a force of the development of association football in Australia where he was for many years the president of the New South Wales association. In May 1901 he was a co-founder of the Auburn baseball club that in later years became known as Orioles.

== Life ==
He was born at Surry Hills to John and Jane Nobbs; they were market gardeners.

Nobbs attended Sydney Grammar School and then farmed at Colo. He also worked for some period as conveyancer. Circa 1883 he founded together with the local chemist R. Richardson the Cumberland Independent newspaper. It was edited by Thomas Courtney, later a parliamentary leader writer for the Sydney Daily Telegraph. However the publication lost money - "some thousands of pounds" - and thus was short-lived. On 16 December 1865 he married Louisa Smedley; they had twelve children. In 1888 he was elected to the New South Wales Legislative Assembly as the Free Trade member for Central Cumberland; he resigned in 1893 facing bankruptcy and lost the subsequent by-election. He returned to the Assembly in 1898 as the member for Granville. He held that seat as a Liberal until his defeat in 1913. He was subsequently a member of the New South Wales Legislative Council from 1917 to 1921.

Nobbs died at Granville in 1921. His wife Louisa Ann Nobbs died in December 1927 aged 78, and was buried beside her husband in the Church of England section of Rookwood Cemetery.

Civic offices
New title	Mayor of Granville; 1885–1886	Succeeded by Harry Richardson
Preceded by Harry Richardson	Mayor of Granville; 1887–1888	Succeeded by Charles Unwin
New South Wales Legislative Assembly
Preceded by Andrew McCulloch; Varney Parkes	Member for Central Cumberland; 1888–1893; Served alongside: Buchanan/Ritchie/Garrard; Farnell/Linsley/Dale	Succeeded by George McCredie
Preceded by George Smailes	Member for Granville; 1898–1913	Succeeded by Jack Lang
