= Varney Parkes =

Australian politician (1859–1935)

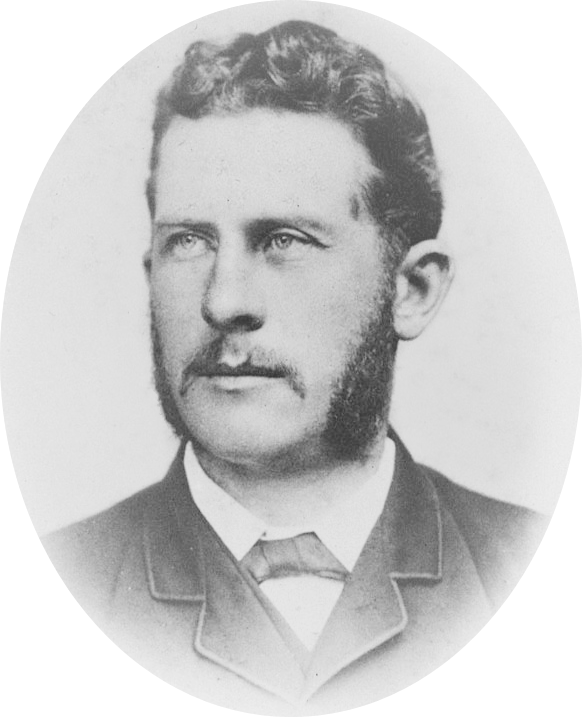
- Born: 4 June 1859; Ryde, New South Wales
- Died: 14 May 1935 (aged 75); Sydney, Australia
- Burial place: Faulconbridge Cemetery
- Parents: Henry Parkes (father); Clarinda Varney (mother)

Varney Parkes (4 June 1859 – 14 May 1935) was an Australian politician, architect and son of Henry Parkes.

== Life and career ==
Parkes was born in the Sydney suburb of Ryde, the seventh child of Henry Parkes and Clarinda Varney. He attended public schools and then The King's School in Parramatta before working at the Bank of New South Wales and the Colonial Architect's Office. On 21 March 1883 he married Mary Cameron Murray, but she died only five months later. On 24 December 1884, Parkes married Mary's older sister Isabella, with whom he had three surviving children.

Parkes worked as an architect at Liverpool and Canterbury, and in partnership with C.H.E. Blackmann (1880–1885). He was elected to the New South Wales Legislative Assembly in 1885 as the member for Central Cumberland. He left the Assembly in 1888 but was re-elected for East Sydney in 1891, switching to Canterbury in 1894. He served until 1900 and then a second term from 1907 to 1913 as a Liberal. In 1895 he was bankrupted, and not discharged until 1907.

Parkes served as Postmaster-General from August 1898 to September 1899. He died in Sydney in 1935.

== Examples of architectural work ==
- Erskineville Public School, Sydney, was designed by Parkes in partnership with C. Blackmann. It is in the Italianate style and was built in 1883. It is heritage-listed.
- Former Bank of New South Wales building, Broadway, Sydney, was designed by Parkes in the Federation Romanesque style and built in 1894. It is heritage-listed.
- St James's Church, King Street, Sydney, was designed by Francis Greenway but has been extensively modified over the years. Parkes redesigned and reclad the spire in 1894. He was also responsible for the tower doorway. The church is heritage-listed.
- Former Bank of New South Wales building, cnr Bathurst and George Streets, Sydney, is a three-storey building of red brick, with sandstone detailing. Now part of the significant Town Hall Group, it was designed by Parkes and built in 1894. It is heritage-listed.
- Marble Bar, Hilton Hotel, Sydney, is an elaborate Victorian room designed by Parkes and built in 1893. It was originally part of Adam's Hotel, which was demolished in 1969. The bar was incorporated into the Hilton Hotel and reopened in 1973. It is heritage-listed.
- Stanmore Public School, Sydney, was designed in partnership with C.Blackmann and built in 1884. It was extended in 1885 for a new girls' wing. In 1914, a local residence, Mona Villa, was acquired by the school to provide more space. The school is heritage-listed.
- Hazeldean, Queen Anne style 35-room, country guest house, Burns Road, Wahroonga, Sydney. Built for George Boyne in 1898 and extended 1903. Elaborate formal rooms with ornate ceilings; archways; multiple marble fireplaces. Heritage-listed.
- Eastwood Town Hall, 74 Agincourt Road, Marsfield. Built in 1911–12; destroyed by fire 1937, rebuilt by Louis P. Burns in 1938. Heritage-listed.

== Gallery ==
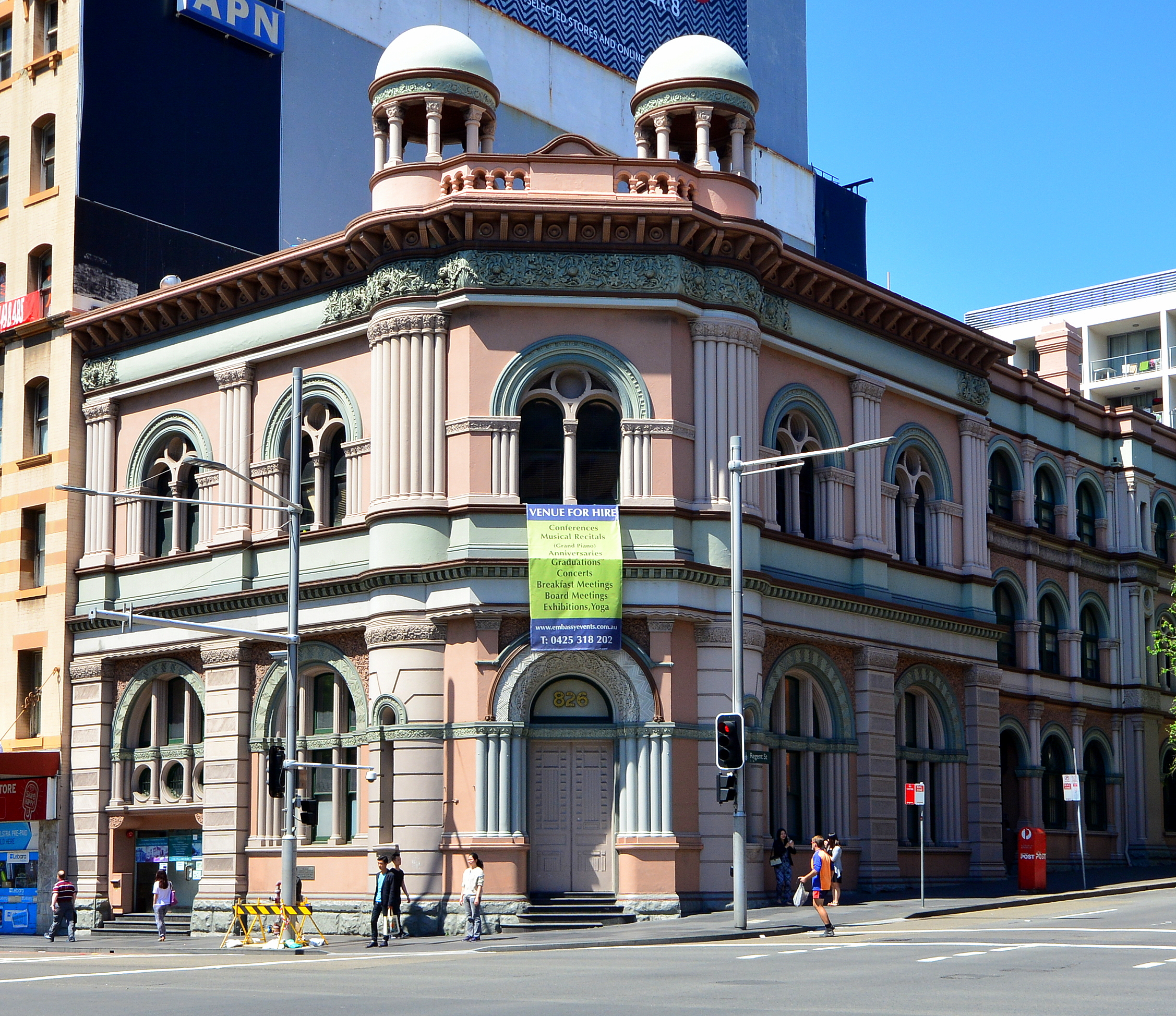
Former Bank of New South Wales, Broadway, Sydney

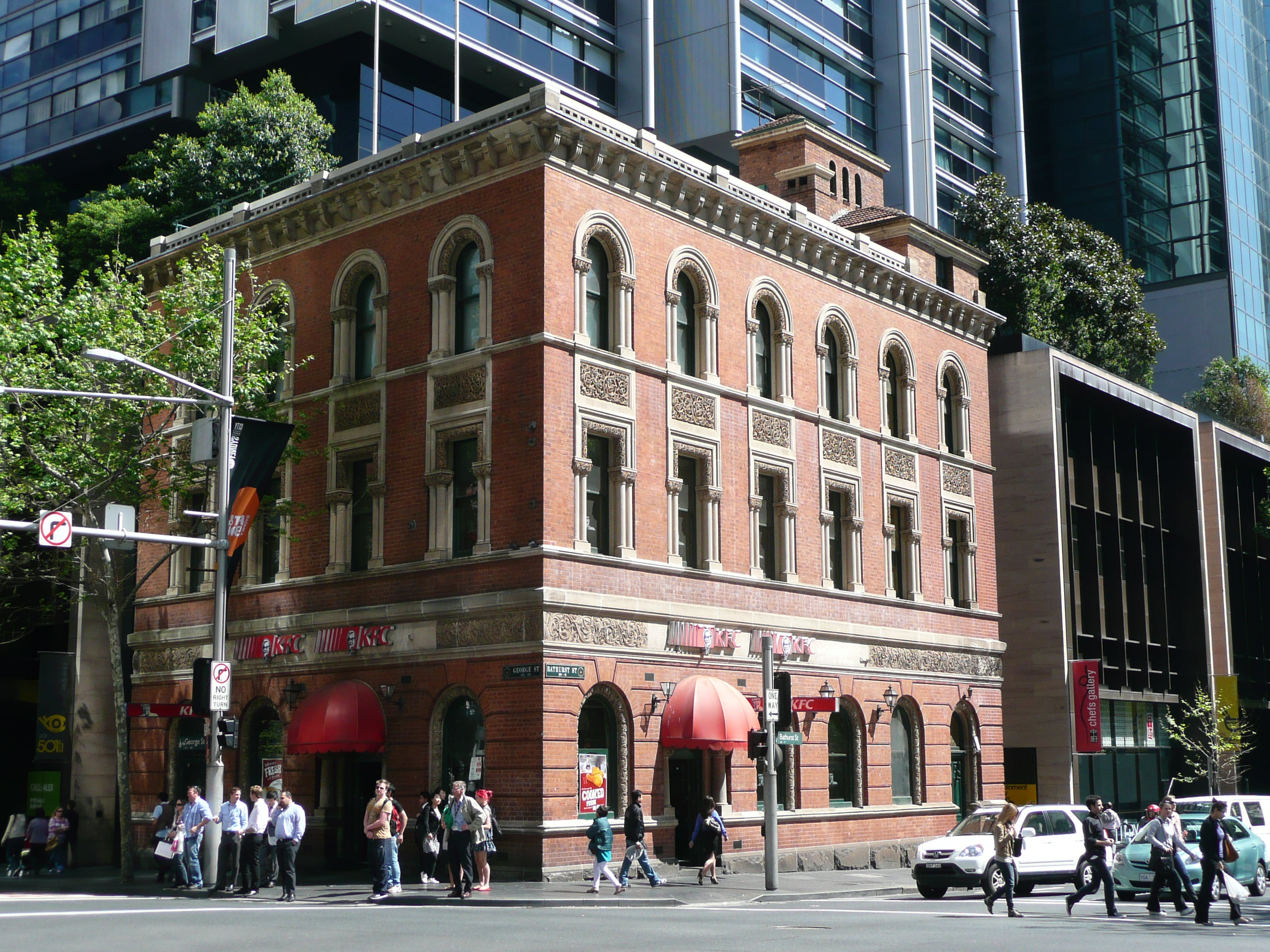
Former Bank of New South Wales, George Street, Sydney

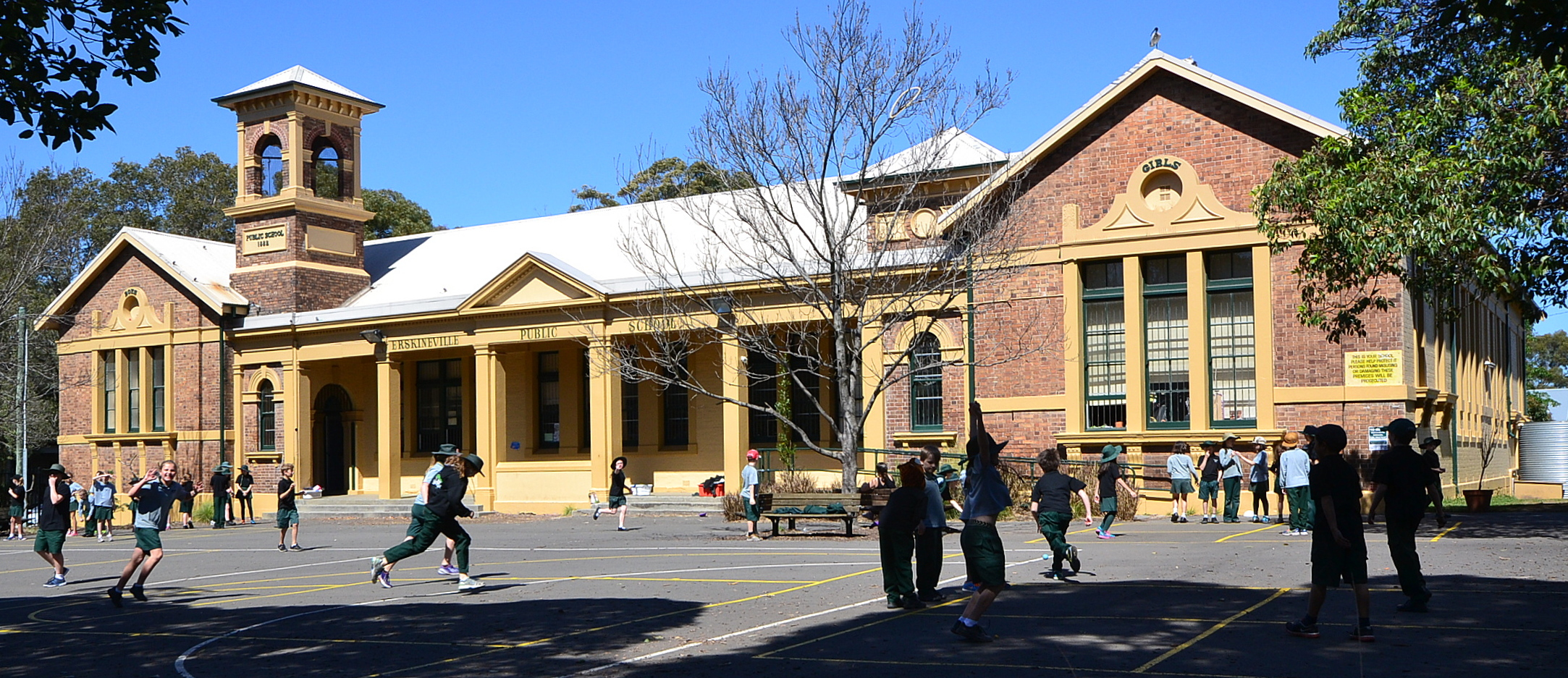
Erskineville Public School, Sydney

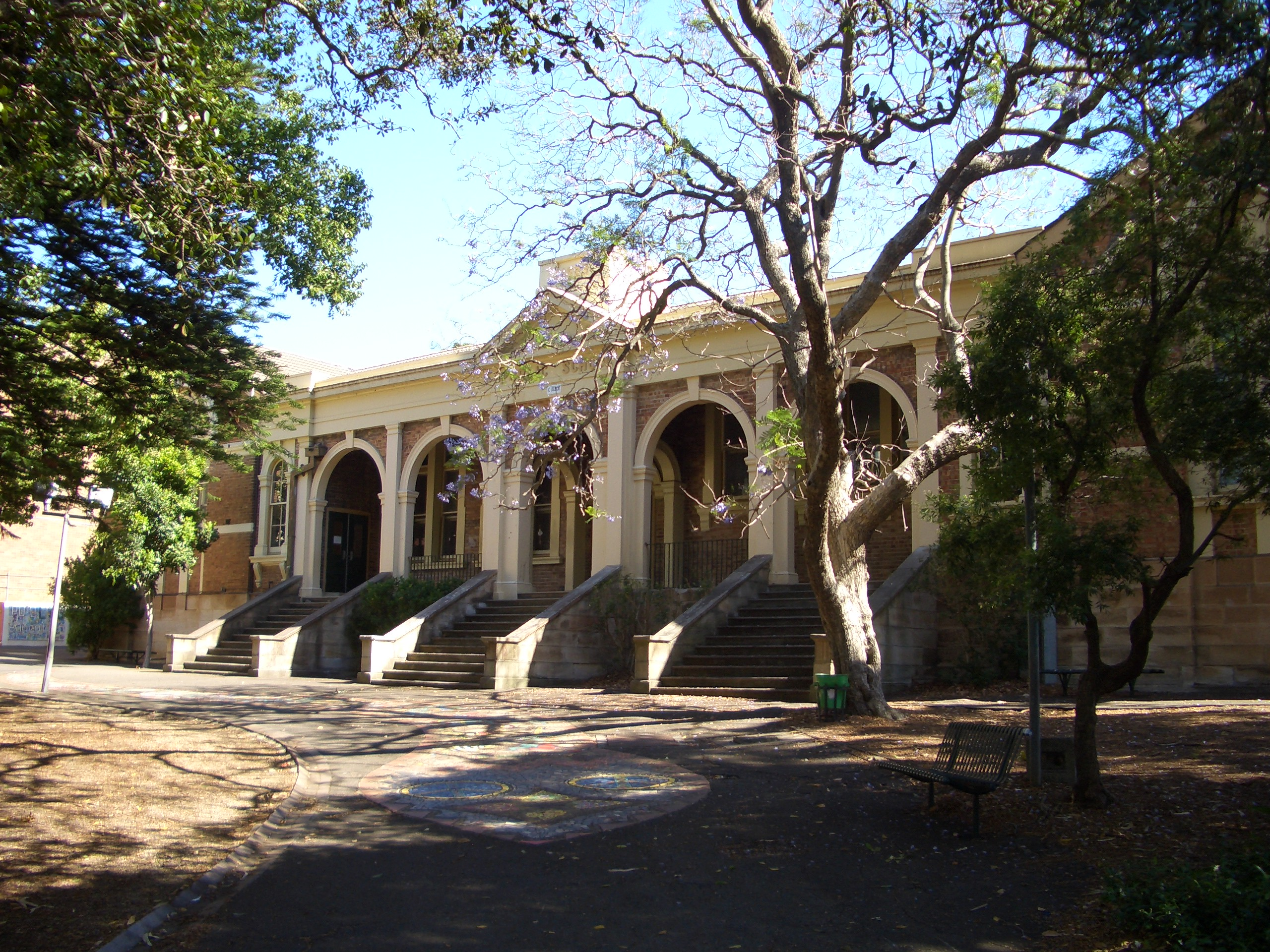
Stanmore Public School, Sydney

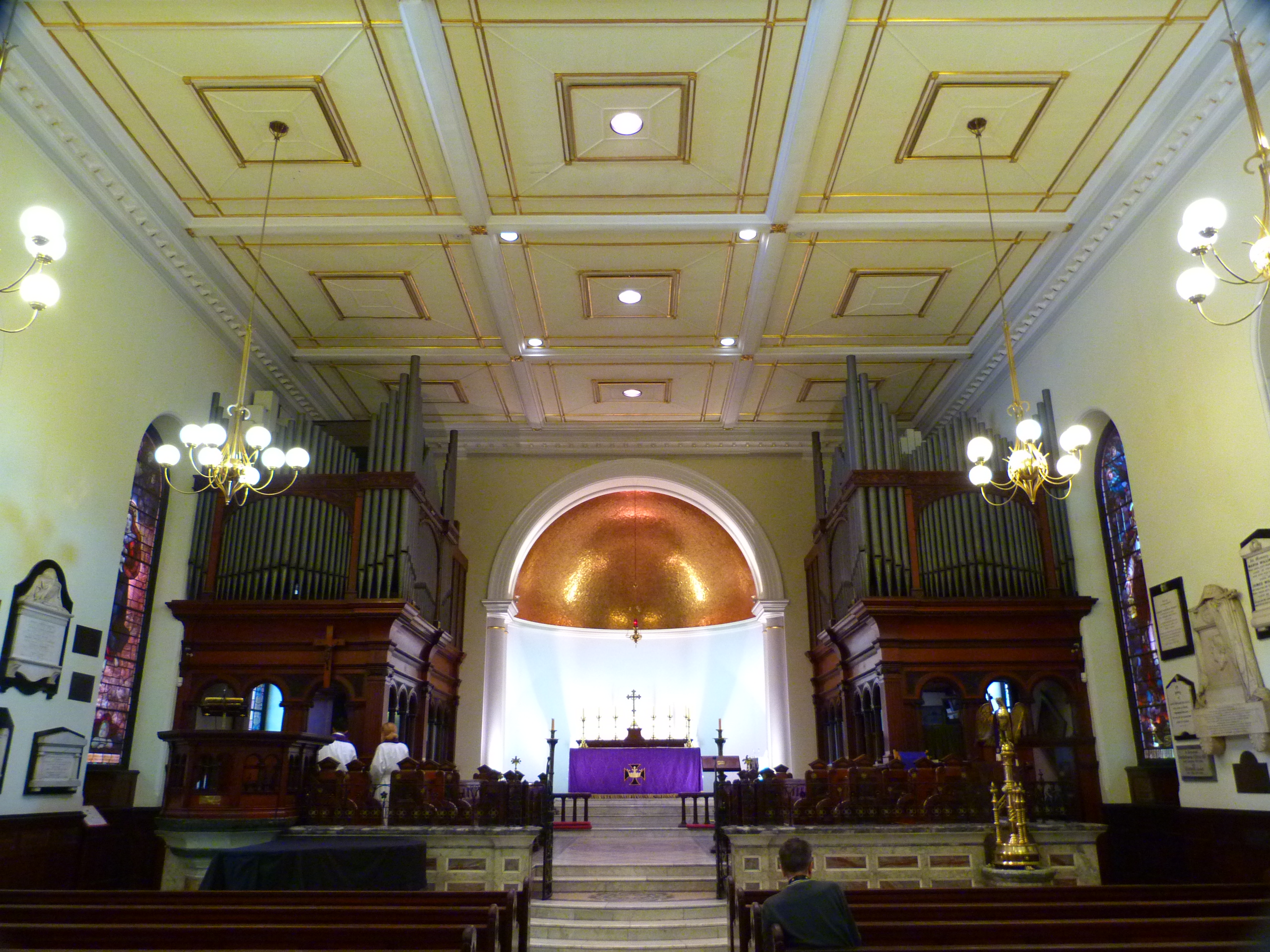
St James's Church, King Street, Sydney

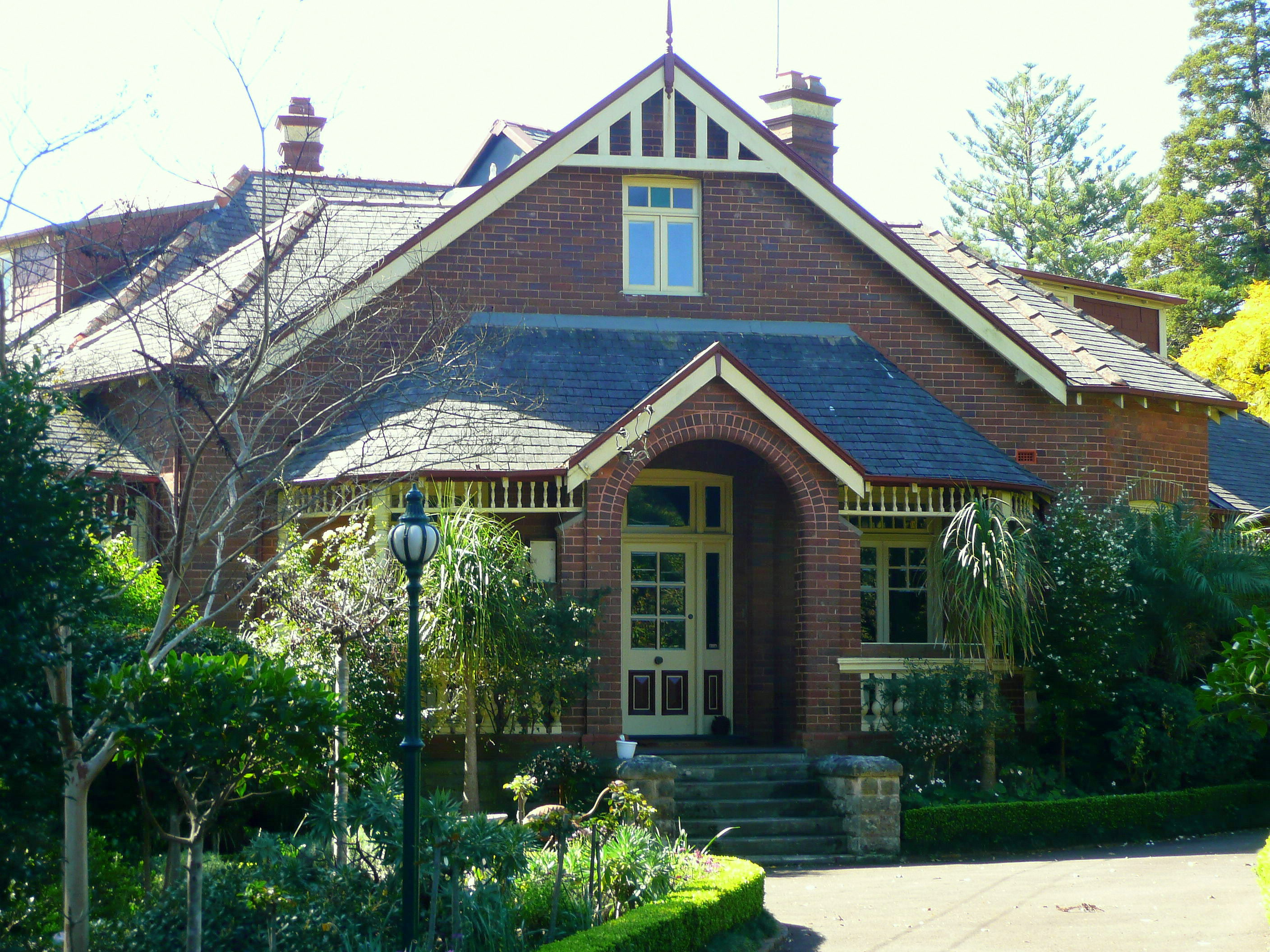
Hazeldean, Wahroonga

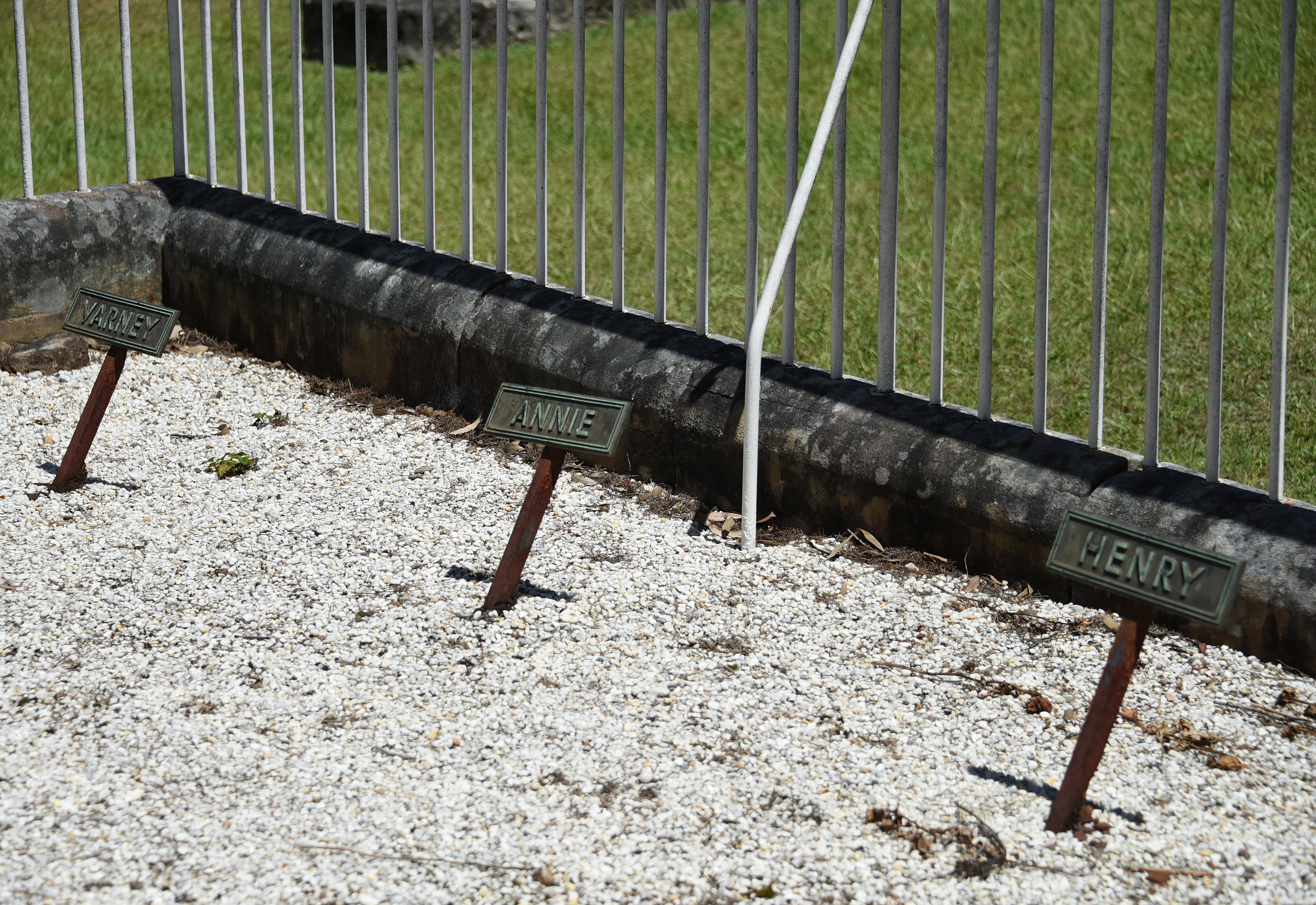
Parkes family graves in Faulconbridge Cemetery, Faulconbridge, New South Wales, with Varney's grave at far left

New South Wales Legislative Assembly
Preceded by John Lackey; Andrew McCulloch	Member for Central Cumberland; 1885 – 1888; Served alongside: McCulloch, Bull/Farnell	Succeeded by John Nobbs
Preceded by Sydney Burdekin	Member for East Sydney; 1891 – 1894; Served alongside: Barton, McMillan, Reid	District abolished
New district	Member for Canterbury; 1894 – 1900	Succeeded by Sydney Smith
Preceded by Thomas Mackenzie	Member for Canterbury; 1907 – 1913	Succeeded by Henry Peters
Political offices
Preceded by Joseph Cook	Postmaster-General of New South Wales; 1898 – 1899	Succeeded by Paddy Crick
