= Thomas Taylor (Australian politician) =

Politician from New South Wales, Australia

Thomas Whitford Taylor (died 15 September 1938) was an Irish-born Australian politician.

He was born in Armagh to an Anglican family. He attended Belfast Academy and Queens University before travelling to Manchester and Liverpool following his father's death. He spent three years in Africa before arriving in Sydney around 1881, where he commenced legal studies. He established a frozen meat export company, moving to Liverpool after its failure around 1884. By 1890, he was a long-serving member of Liverpool Council and was twice the mayor. In 1900, he was elected to the New South Wales Legislative Assembly in a by-election for the seat of Canterbury; he defeated sitting member Sydney Smith and does not appear to have belonged to any of the political parties of the time. Defeated by the Liberal candidate in 1901, he did not win office again, although he ran unsuccessfully for several more state and federal elections.

New South Wales Legislative Assembly
Preceded by Sydney Smith	Member for Canterbury; 1900–1901	Succeeded by Thomas Mackenzie
