= John Lackey (politician) =

Australian politician

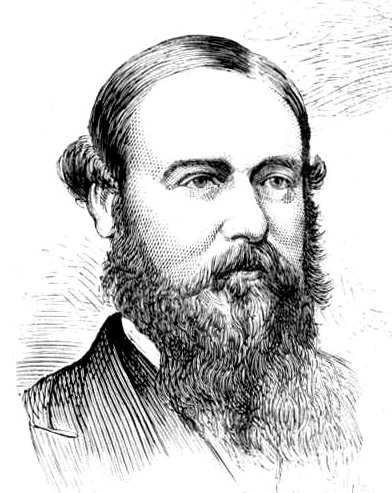
John Lackey, 1875 engraving

Sir John Lackey KCMG (6 October 1830 – 11 November 1903) was a magistrate and politician in colonial New South Wales, President of the New South Wales Legislative Council 1892 to 1903.

== Early life ==
Lackey was born in Sydney, New South Wales, son of William Lackey and his second wife Mary, née O'Dowd.

His grandfather was a wealthy publican and paid for his education Lackey was educated at the Sydney College, subsequently adopting pastoral pursuits in the Parramatta district. In 1852 he became a magistrate.

== Parliamentary career ==
He unsuccessfully contested Central Cumberland at the 1859 election, He was the first of two members elected for Parramatta at the election on 8 December 1860. James Byrnes took offence at being placed second behind a newcomer, stating that the majority of voters had decided that he was not fit to serve them and resigned in March 1861 without taking his seat. Lackey strongly supported the passing of the Robertson Land Acts in 1861. He was defeated at Parramatta at the election on 24 November 1864, but on 27 June 1867 he won the Central Cumberland by-election to re-enter the Assembly. He was Chairman of Committees from February 1870 August 1872. From February 1875 to March 1877, he was Secretary for Public Works in the third Robertson ministry. In 1877 he was Minister of Justice and Public Instruction in the short-lived fourth Robertson ministry and was again Secretary for Public Works in the Parkes-Robertson Administration from December 1878 to January 1883.

In August 1885 he resigned from the Legislative Assembly and was appointed to the Legislative Council in December 1885. In 1889 he was the Vice-President of the Executive Council in the second Dibbs ministry. In August 1892 he was appointed President of the Legislative Council, serving until his resignation as president on 23 May 1903.

== Death ==
Lackey died on 11 November 1903 (aged 73) in Bong Bong, New South Wales, survived by two sons.

== Honours ==
He was made a Knight Commander of the Order of St Michael and St George (KCMG) in 1894.

Political offices
Preceded by John Sutherland	Secretary for Public Works; 1875 – 1877	Succeeded by James Hoskins
Preceded by Francis Suttor	Minister of Justice and Public Instruction; Aug – Dec 1877	Succeeded by Joseph Leary
Preceded by John Sutherland	Secretary for Public Works; 1878 – 1883	Succeeded by Henry Copeland
Preceded by Julian Salomons	Vice-President of the Executive Council; Jan – Mar 1889	Succeeded by Julian Salomons
New South Wales Legislative Assembly
Preceded by George Oakes	Member for Parramatta; 1860 – 1864; Served alongside: James Byrnes / Arthur Holroyd	Succeeded by James Byrnes; James Farnell
Preceded by John Hay	Member for Central Cumberland; 1867 – 1885; Served alongside: Macpherson / Lyons / Flood / Hurley / Wearne / Long	Succeeded by Varney Parkes
New South Wales Legislative Council
Preceded by Sir John Hay	President of the Legislative Council; 1892 – 1903	Succeeded by Sir Francis Suttor
