= Electoral district of Central Cumberland =

State electoral district of New South Wales, Australia

Central Cumberland was an electoral district of the Legislative Assembly in the Australian state of New South Wales from 1859 to 1894, in Cumberland County, which includes Sydney, although the then built-up areas were in other electorates. It elected two members simultaneously from 1859 to 1885, three members from 1885 to 1889 and four members from 1889 to 1894, with voters casting a vote for each vacancy. In 1894, multi-member electorates were abolished and replaced by single-member electorates.

== Members for Central Cumberland ==
Two members (1859–1885)
Member	Party	Term	Member	Party	Term						
John Laycock	None	1859–1864	James Atkinson	None	1859–1863						
John Laycock	None	1859–1864	Allan Macpherson	None	1863–1868						
John Hay	None	1864–1867	Allan Macpherson	None	1863–1868						
John Lackey	None	1867–1885	Allan Macpherson	None	1863–1868						
John Lackey	None	1867–1885	Samuel Lyons	None	1868–1869						
John Lackey	None	1867–1885	Edward Flood	None	1869–1872						
John Lackey	None	1867–1885	John Hurley	None	1872–1874						
John Lackey	None	1867–1885	Joseph Wearne	None	1875–1875						
John Lackey	None	1867–1885	William Long	None	1875–1877						
John Lackey	None	1867–1885	Andrew McCulloch	None	1877–1885						
Varney Parkes	None	1885	Andrew McCulloch	None	1877–1885						
Three members (1885–1889)
Member	Party	Term	Member	Party	Term	Member	Party	Term			
Varney Parkes	None	1885–1887	Andrew McCulloch	None	1885–1887	Nathaniel Bull	None	1885–1887			
Varney Parkes	Free Trade	1887–1888	Andrew McCulloch	Free Trade	1887–1888	Frank Farnell	Free Trade	1887–1889			
John Nobbs	Free Trade	1888–1889	David Buchanan	Protectionist	1888–1889	Frank Farnell	Free Trade	1887–1889			
Four members (1889–1894)
Member	Party	Term	Member	Party	Term	Member	Party	Term	Member	Party	Term
John Nobbs	Free Trade	1889–1893	Frank Farnell	Free Trade	1889–1894	Robert Ritchie	Free Trade	1889–1891	John Linsley	Free Trade	1889–1889
John Nobbs	Free Trade	1889–1893	Frank Farnell	Free Trade	1889–1894	Robert Ritchie	Free Trade	1889–1891	David Dale	Free Trade	1889–1894
John Nobbs	Free Trade	1889–1893	Frank Farnell	Free Trade	1889–1894	Jacob Garrard	Free Trade	1891–1894	David Dale	Free Trade	1889–1894
George McCredie	Free Trade	1893–1894	Frank Farnell	Free Trade	1889–1894	Jacob Garrard	Free Trade	1891–1894	David Dale	Free Trade	1889–1894

== Election results ==
1891 New South Wales colonial election: Central Cumberland Wednesday 17 June
Party	Candidate	Votes	%	±%
Free Trade	Frank Farnell (re-elected 1)	2,850	15.8	
Free Trade	Robert Ritchie (re-elected 2)	2,491	13.8	
Free Trade	John Nobbs (re-elected 3)	2,435	13.5	
Free Trade	David Dale (re-elected 4)	1,978	11.0	
Labour	John Gannon	1,614	9.0	
Protectionist	Cyrus Fuller	1,449	8.0	
Labour	John Marshall	1,389	7.7	
Protectionist	Walter Airey	1,092	6.1	
Ind. Free Trade	Thomas Taylor	1,016	5.6	
Ind. Free Trade	John Forsyth	964	5.4	
Ind. Free Trade	John Ferguson	740	4.1	
Total formal votes		18,018	99.1	
Informal votes		163	0.9	
Turnout		5,744	57.9	
Free Trade hold 4				
