= Electoral results for the district of East Macquarie =

Election results for East Macquarie, New South Wales, Australia

East Macquarie, an electoral district of the Legislative Assembly in the Australian state of New South Wales was created in 1859 and abolished in 1894.

Election	Member	Party	Member	Party
1859	William Suttor, Sr.	None	William Cummings	None
1859 by	Thomas Hawkins	None	William Cummings	None
1860 by	Daniel Deniehy	None	William Cummings	None
1860	William Suttor, Sr.	None	William Cummings	None
1864 by	David Buchanan	None	William Cummings	None
1864	David Buchanan	None	William Cummings	None
1867 by	John Suttor	None	William Cummings	None
1869	John Suttor	None	William Cummings	None
1872	James Martin	None	William Cummings	None
1873 by	Walter Cooper	None	William Cummings	None
1875	John Booth	None	William Suttor, Jr.	None
1877	John Robertson	None	William Suttor, Jr.	None
1878 by	Edmund Webb	None	William Suttor, Jr.	None
1879 by	Edmund Webb	None	Edward Combes	None
1880	Edmund Webb	None	Edward Combes	None
Jan 1882 by	Alfred Pechey	None	Edward Combes	None
Jul 1882 by	Sydney Smith	None	Edward Combes	None
1882	Sydney Smith	None	Edward Combes	None
1885	Sydney Smith	None	John Shepherd	None
1887	Sydney Smith	Free Trade	James Tonkin	Free Trade
1889	Sydney Smith	Free Trade	James Tonkin	Free Trade
1891	Sydney Smith	Free Trade	James Tonkin	Free Trade
1892 by	Sydney Smith	Free Trade	James Tonkin	Free Trade

== Election results ==
=== Elections in the 1890s ===
==== 1892 by-election ====
1892 East Macquarie by-election Saturday 13 August
Party	Candidate	Votes	%	±%
Free Trade	James Tonkin (re-elected)	845	61.5	
Protectionist	John Boyd	528	38.5	
Total formal votes		1,373	97.6	−1.9
Informal votes		33	2.4	+1.9
Turnout		1,406	54.1 (Note: Estimate based on an electoral roll of 2,600 at the 1891 election.)	−8.3
Free Trade hold				

James Tonkin (Free Trade) resigned due to bankruptcy.

==== 1891 ====
1891 New South Wales colonial election: East Macquarie Friday 19 June
Party	Candidate	Votes	%	±%
Free Trade	Sydney Smith (re-elected 1)	961	37.8	
Free Trade	James Tonkin (re-elected 2)	893	35.1	
Protectionist	Alfred Hales	688	27.1	
Total formal votes		2,542	99.5	
Informal votes		12	0.5	
Turnout		1,621	62.4	
Free Trade hold 2				

=== Elections in the 1880s ===
==== 1889 ====
1889 New South Wales colonial election: East Macquarie Saturday 16 February
Party	Candidate	Votes	%	±%
Free Trade	James Tonkin (re-elected 1)	945	35.6	
Free Trade	Sydney Smith (re-elected 2)	938	35.4	
Protectionist	Francis Suttor	770	29.0	
Total formal votes		2,653	99.6	
Informal votes		12	0.5	
Turnout		1,691	64.9	
Free Trade hold 2				

==== 1887 ====
1887 New South Wales colonial election: East Macquarie Friday 11 February
Party	Candidate	Votes	%	±%
Free Trade	Sydney Smith (re-elected 1)	951	42.2	
Free Trade	James Tonkin (elected 2)	795	35.2	
Protectionist	Paddy Crick	510	22.6	
Total formal votes		2,256	99.5	
Informal votes		11	0.5	
Turnout		1,264	45.1	

John Shepherd unsuccessfully contested Paddington.

==== 1885 ====
1885 New South Wales colonial election: East Macquarie Monday 26 October
Candidate	Votes	%
Sydney Smith (re-elected 1)	1,113	43.1
John Shepherd (elected 2)	587	22.7
John Hughes	528	20.4
James Tonkin	355	13.7
Total formal votes	2,583	99.2
Informal votes	21	0.8
Turnout	1,474	65.8

==== 1882 ====
1882 New South Wales colonial election: East Macquarie Thursday 7 December
Candidate	Votes	%
Sydney Smith (re-elected 1)	unopposed	
Edward Combes (re-elected 2)	unopposed	

==== July 1882 by-election ====
July 1882 East Macquarie by-election Tuesday 11 July
Candidate	Votes	%
Sydney Smith (elected)	710	54.7
Robert Thompson	589	45.3
Total formal votes	1,299	98.3
Informal votes	22	1.7
Turnout	1,321	64.1

Alfred Pechey died.

==== January 1882 by-election ====
January 1882 East Macquarie by-election Thursday 19 January
Candidate	Votes	%
Alfred Pechey (elected)	423	35.1
Sydney Smith	375	31.1
Charles Roberts	357	29.6
Thomas Dalveen	50	4.2
Total formal votes	1,205	96.8
Informal votes	40	3.2
Turnout	1,245	60.1

Edmund Webb was appointed to the Legislative Council.

==== 1880 ====
1880 New South Wales colonial election: East Macquarie Tuesday 23 November
Candidate	Votes	%
Edward Combes (re-elected 1)	903	41.7
Edmund Webb (re-elected 2)	737	34.0
Sydney Smith	526	24.3
Total formal votes	2,166	99.4
Informal votes	13	0.6
Turnout	1,280	62.3

=== Elections in the 1870s ===
==== 1879 by-election ====
1879 East Macquarie by-election Friday 15 August
Candidate	Votes	%
Edward Combes (elected)	784	72.1
Thomas Dalveen	303	27.9
Total formal votes	1,087	100.0
Informal votes	0	0.0
Turnout	1,087	51.5

William Suttor Jr. resigned.

==== 1878 by-election ====
1878 East Macquarie by-election Friday 1 February
Candidate	Votes	%
Edmund Webb (elected)	556	61.0
Thomas Dalveen	356	39.0
Total formal votes	912	97.7
Informal votes	21	2.3
Turnout	933	45.2

Sir John Robertson resigned because he had also been elected to Mudgee.

==== 1877 ====
1877 New South Wales colonial election: East Macquarie Monday 5 November
Candidate	Votes	%
Sir John Robertson (elected 1)	781	38.5
William Suttor Jr. (re-elected 2)	627	30.9
William Cummings	515	25.4
George Stephen	105	5.2
Total formal votes	2,028	99.0
Informal votes	21	1.0
Turnout	1,307	63.4

==== 1875 ====
1874–75 New South Wales colonial election: East Macquarie Tuesday 5 January 1875
Candidate	Votes	%
William Suttor Jr. (elected 1)	750	38.4
John Booth (elected 2)	607	31.1
William Cummings (defeated)	546	28.0
James Daley	49	2.5
Total formal votes	1,952	98.5
Informal votes	30	1.5
Turnout	1,432	49.9

==== 1873 by-election ====
1873 East Macquarie by-election Monday 1 December
Candidate	Votes	%
Walter Cooper (elected)	513	46.8
Henry Rotton	357	32.5
Bernhardt Holtermann	224	20.4
John Smeed	3	0.3
Total formal votes	1,097	94.7
Informal votes	61	5.3
Turnout	1,158	39.2

Sir James Martin was appointed Chief Justice of New South Wales.

==== 1872 ====
1872 New South Wales colonial election: East Macquarie Thursday 22 February
Candidate	Votes	%
William Cummings (re-elected 1)	611	33.8
James Martin (elected 2)	495	27.4
Joseph Innes	424	23.5
John Smith	278	15.4
Total formal votes	1,808	100.0
Informal votes	0	0.0
Turnout	1,808	32.7

=== Elections in the 1860s ===
==== 1869 ====
1869–70 New South Wales colonial election: East Macquarie Tuesday 21 December 1869
Candidate	Votes	%
John Suttor (re-elected 1)	513	45.4
William Cummings (re-elected 2)	426	37.7
Samuel Robinson	190	16.8
Total formal votes	1,129	100.0
Informal votes	0	0.0
Turnout	564	24.8

==== 1867 by-election ====
1867 East Macquarie by-election Monday 26 August
Candidate	Votes	%
John Suttor (elected)	914	70.7
Robert Forster	378	29.3
Total formal votes	1,292	37.8
Informal votes	43	3.2
Turnout	1,335	63.0

The by-election was caused by the resignation of David Buchanan.

==== 1864 ====
1864–65 New South Wales colonial election: East Macquarie Saturday 24 December 1864
Candidate	Votes	%
William Cummings (re-elected 1)	955	39.0
David Buchanan (re-elected 2)	800	32.6
Thomas Lee	623	25.4
Patrick McDonagh	73	3.0
Total formal votes	2,451	100.0
Informal votes	0	0.0
Turnout	1,491	66.4

==== 1864 by-election ====
1864 East Macquarie by-election Thursday 6 October
Candidate	Votes	%
David Buchanan (elected)	375	52.2
Joseph West	343	48.8
Total formal votes	718	100.0
Informal votes	0	0.0
Turnout	718	32.0

William Suttor Sr. resigned.

==== 1860 ====
1860 New South Wales colonial election: East Macquarie Tuesday 11 December
Candidate	Votes	%
William Suttor Sr. (elected 1)	500	40.9
William Cummings (re-elected 2)	373	30.5
Daniel Deniehy (defeated)	350	28.6
Total formal votes	1,223	100.0
Informal votes	0	0.0
Turnout	880	39.1

==== 1860 by-election ====
1860 East Macquarie by-election Thursday 10 May
Candidate	Votes	%
Daniel Deniehy (elected)	496	68.7
John McGuigan	215	29.8
Henry Dangar	11	1.5
Total formal votes	722	100.0
Informal votes	0	0.0
Turnout	722	54.6

Thomas Hawkins resigned.

=== Elections in the 1850s ===
==== 1859 by-election ====
1859 East Macquarie by-election Thursday 6 October
Candidate	Votes	%
Thomas Hawkins (elected)	407	57.2
Daniel Deniehy	305	42.8
Total formal votes	712	100.0
Informal votes	0	0.0
Turnout	712	53.9

William Suttor Sr. resigned.

==== 1859 ====
1859 New South Wales colonial election: East Macquarie Monday 13 June
Candidate	Votes	%
William Cummings (elected 1)	415	28.1
William Suttor Sr. (re-elected 2)	394	26.7
Charles McPhillamy	370	25.1
Charles Whalan	298	20.2
Total formal votes	1,477	100.0
Informal votes	0	0.0
Turnout	1,477	55.9
