= Members of the New South Wales Legislative Assembly, 1877–1880 =

Members of the New South Wales Legislative Assembly who served in the ninth parliament of New South Wales held their seats from 1877 to 1880. The 1877 election was held between 24 October and 12 November 1877 with parliament first meeting on 27 November 1877. There were 73 members elected for 53 single member electorates, 6 two member electorates and 2 four member electorates. Premiers during this parliament were Sir John Robertson until 18 December 1877, James Farnell from 18 December 1877 until 21 December 1878 and Sir Henry Parkes from 21 December 1878. The Speaker was Sir George Allen.

Name	Electorate	Years in office
Sir George Allen	Glebe	1869–1883
Henry Badgery (Note: East Maitland MLA Stephen Scholey died on 13 May 1878. The resulting by-election was won by Henry Badgery on 5 June 1878.)	East Maitland	1878–1885
Ezekiel Baker	Goldfields South	1870–1877, 1879–1881, 1884–1887
Robert Barbour	Murray	1877–1880, 1882–1894
Edmund Barton (Note: University of Sydney MLA William Windeyer resigned to become a Judge of the New South Wales Supreme Court in August 1879. The resulting by-election was won by Edmund Barton on 26 August 1879.)	University of Sydney	1879–1887, 1891–1894, 1898–1900
Thomas Bawden (Note: Clarence MLA Thomas Bawden resigned in March 1880. The resulting by-election on 7 April 1880 was won by Charles Fawcett.)	Clarence	1869–1880
Hanley Bennett	Liverpool Plains	1872–1880
Louis Beyers	Goldfields West	1877–1882
Richard Bowker	Newcastle	1858–1859, 1877–1880
Alexander Bowman	Hawkesbury	1877–1882, 1885–1892
Herbert Brown	Paterson	1875–1898
Stephen Brown	Newtown	1864–1881
William Browne	Patrick's Plains	1872–1880
David Buchanan (Note: Mudgee MLA Richard Rouse's 1 vote victory at the 1879 by-election was overturned by the Elections and Qualifications Committee. David Buchanan was declared to be the member for Mudgee.)	Mudgee	1860–1862, 1864–1867, 1869–1877, 1879–1885, 1888–1889
John Burns	Hunter	1861–1869, 1872–1891
Angus Cameron	West Sydney	1874–1889, 1894–1896
Samuel Charles (Note: Kiama MLA Samuel Charles resigned in June 1880 to take a voyage to Europe. The resulting by-election on 2 July 1880 was won by Harman Tarrant.)	Kiama	1874–1880
Henry Clarke	Eden	1869–1894, 1895–1904
Henry Cohen	West Maitland	1874–1885
Edward Combes (Note: Orange MLA Edward Combes was declared to have an office of profit under the crown. The resulting by-election was won by Andrew Kerr on 4 March 1879.) (Note: East Macquarie MLA William Suttor resigned in July 1879. The resulting by-election on 15 August 1879 was won by Edward Combes.)	Orange, East Macquarie	1872–1874, 1877–1885
Walter Coonan	Bogan	1877–1880, 1882–1887
Henry Copeland	Goldfields North	1877–1883, 1883–1895, 1895–1900
Thomas Dangar	Gwydir	1865–1885, 1887–1890
John Davies	East Sydney	1874–1887
William Davies	Argyle	1877–1880
George Day	Hume	1874–1889
John Dillon	Tenterfield	1869–1872, 1877–1882
Richard Driver (Note: Windsor MLA Richard Driver died on 7 July 1880. The resulting by-election on 29 July 1880 was won by Henry McQuade.)	Windsor	1860–1880
Joseph Eckford	Wollombi	1860–1872, 1877–1882
James Farnell	St Leonards	1860–1860, 1864–1885, 1887–1888
Charles Fawcett	Clarence	1880–1882
Michael Fitzpatrick	Yass Plains	1869–1881
Thomas Garrett	Camden	1860–1871, 1872–1891
Samuel Gray (Note: Illawarra MLA Samuel Gray resigned in June 1880. The resulting by-election on 7 July 1880 was won by Alexander Stuart.)	Illawarra	1859–1864, 1874–1880, 1882–1885
James Greenwood	East Sydney	1877–1880
Edward Greville	Braidwood	1870–1880
John Harris	West Sydney	1877–1880, 1882–1885
William Hezlet (Note: Paddington MLA John Sutherland resigned in January 1880 because he held a position of profit under the crown. The resulting by-election on 20 February 1880 was won by William Hezlet.)	Paddington	1880–1882
James Hoskins	Tumut	1859–1863, 1868–1882
Thomas Hungerford (Note: Northumberland MLA Thomas Hungerford resigned in April 1880 to attend to personal financial matters. The resulting by-election was won by Ninian Melville on 30 April 1880.)	Northumberland	1875-1875, 1877–1882, 1885–1887
John Hurley (b.1796)	Narellan	1859–1860, 1864–1869, 1872–1880
John Hurley (b.1844)	Hartley	1872–1874, 1876–1880, 1887–1891, 1901–1907
Archibald Jacob	Lower Hunter	1872–1882
William Johnston	Williams	1877–1880
Andrew Kerr	Orange	1879–1882
John Lackey	Central Cumberland	1860–1864, 1867–1880
Joseph Leary	Murrumbidgee	1860–1864, 1869–1872, 1876–1880
William Long	Parramatta	1875–1880
John Lucas	Canterbury	1860–1869, 1871–1880
Andrew Lynch	Carcoar	1876–1884
John Macintosh	East Sydney	1872–1880
Andrew McCulloch	Central Cumberland	1877–1888
John McElhone	Upper Hunter	1875–1889, 1895–1898
Henry McQuade	Windsor	1880, 1882–1885
Ninian Melville	Northumberland	1880–1887, 1889–1894
James Merriman	West Sydney	1877–1880
Henry Moses	Hawkesbury	1869–1880, 1882–1885
John Murphy	Monaro	1877–1880
Daniel O'Connor	West Sydney	1877–1891, 1900–1904
Arthur Onslow	Camden	1869–1880
Sir Henry Parkes	Canterbury	1856, 1858, 1859–1861, 1864–1870, 1872–1895
Charles Pilcher	West Macquarie	1874–1882
Arthur Renwick (Note: East Sydney MLA Alexander Stuart resigned to take the post of Agent-General in November 1879. The resulting by-election on 17 December 1879 was won by Arthur Renwick.)	East Sydney	1879–1882, 1885–1887
Sir John Robertson (Note: East Macquarie MLA John Robertson was elected to two seats, East Macquarie and Mudgee. He resigned the seat of East Macquarie and represented Mudgee. The resulting by-election on 1 February 1878 was won by Edmund Webb.) (Note: Mudgee MLA John Robertson was elevated to the Legislative Council in December 1878. The resulting by-election on 6 January 1879 was won by Richard Rouse by 1 vote.)	East Macquarie, Mudgee	1856–1861, 1862–1865, 1865–1866, 1866–1870, 1870–1877, 1877–1878, 1882–1886
John Roseby	Shoalhaven	1877–1882
Richard Rouse	Mudgee	1876–1877, 1879
Stephen Scholey	East Maitland	1872–1878
John Shepherd	Wellington	1877–1880, 1885–1887, 1889–1891
Colin Simson	Balranald	1877–1880
Robert Smith	Hastings	1870–1889
Thomas Smith	Nepean	1877–1887, 1895–1904
Alexander Stuart	East Sydney, Illawarra	1874–1885
John Sutherland	Paddington	1860–1881, 1882–1889
Francis Suttor	Bathurst	1875–1890
William Suttor	East Macquarie	1875–1879
Harman Tarrant	Kiama	1880–1887
Hugh Taylor	Parramatta	1872–1880, 1882–1894
William Teece	Goulburn	1872–1880
Samuel Terry	New England	1859–1869, 1871–1881
James Thompson	Queanbeyan	1877–1881
James Watson	Lachlan	1869–1882, 1884–1885
Edmund Webb	East Macquarie	1869–1874, 1878–1881
William Windeyer	University of Sydney	1859–1862, 1866–1872, 1876–1879
Robert Wisdom	Morpeth	1859–1872, 1874–1887

== See also ==
- Fourth Robertson ministry
- Farnell ministry
- Third Parkes ministry
- Results of the 1877 New South Wales colonial election
- Candidates of the 1877 New South Wales colonial election

== Notes ==
There was no party system in New South Wales politics until 1887. Under the constitution, ministers were required to resign to recontest their seats in a by-election when appointed. These by-elections are only noted when the minister was defeated; in general, he was elected unopposed.
