= Candidates of the 1877 New South Wales colonial election =

This is a list of candidates for the 1877 New South Wales colonial election. The election was held from 24 October to 12 November 1877.

There was no recognisable party structure at this election.

== Retiring Members ==
- Edward Butler MLA (Argyle)
- Charles Byrnes MLA (Parramatta)
- William Hay MLA (Murray)
- George Lord MLA (Bogan) — appointed to the Legislative Council
- Joseph Phelps MLA (Balranald)
- Patrick Shepherd MLA (Nepean)
- James Warden MLA (Shoalhaven)
- John Wright MLA (Queanbeyan)

== Legislative Assembly ==
Sitting members are shown in bold text. Successful candidates are highlighted.

Electorates are arranged chronologically from the day the poll was held. Because of the sequence of polling, some sitting members who were defeated in their constituencies were then able to contest other constituencies later in the polling period. On the second occasion, these members are shown in italic text.

Electorate	Successful candidates	Unsuccessful candidates
Wednesday 24 October 1877
East Sydney	**John Davies**; James Greenwood; **John Macintosh**; **Alexander Stuart**	William Cover; Sedgwick Cowper; Francis Dixon; Isaac Josephson; Josiah Mason; Ninian Melville; **Henry Parkes**; George Perry
Thursday 25 October 1877
West Sydney	**Angus Cameron**; John Harris; James Merriman; Daniel O'Connor	**Henry Dangar**; **George Dibbs**; Henry Fisher; Jacob Garrard; Archibald Hamilton; Joseph O'Connor; Benjamin Palmer; **John Robertson**; Thomas White
Friday 26 October 1877
Goulburn	**William Teece**	Frederick Horn
Newcastle	Richard Bowker	William Brookes; Thomas Hungerford; **George Lloyd**
Orange	**Edward Combes**	
Paddington	**John Sutherland**	
Saturday 27 October 1877
Narellan	**John Hurley (b 1796)**	John Kidd
Newtown	**Stephen Brown**	James Yeomans
Parramatta	**William Long**; **Hugh Taylor**	John Bergan; Walter Cooper; George Young
Paterson	**Herbert Brown**	
Monday 29 October 1877
Bathurst	**Francis Suttor**	David Williamson
Canterbury	**John Lucas**; Henry Parkes	William Henson; **Richard Hill**; George Pile
Central Cumberland	**John Lackey**; Andrew McCulloch	
Glebe	**George Allen**	Charles Mossman
Illawarra	**Samuel Gray**	
Kiama	**Samuel Charles**	
Morpeth	**Robert Wisdom**	
Nepean	Thomas Smith	**John Smith**
Northumberland	Thomas Hungerford	**William Turner**
Queanbeyan	James Thompson	William O'Neill; Thomas Rutledge
Tuesday 30 October 1877
Camden	**Thomas Garrett**; **Arthur Onslow**	Thomas Fisher
Carcoar	**Andrew Lynch**	
Eden	**Henry Clarke**	Henry Parkes
Hawkesbury	Alexander Bowman; **Henry Moses**	George Davies; **William Piddington**; Thomas Primrose
Hunter	**John Burns**	
Lower Hunter	**Archibald Jacob**	
Patrick's Plains	**William Browne**	William Durham
Wednesday 31 October 1877
Braidwood	**Edward Greville**	
East Maitland	**Stephen Scholey**	Alexander Dodds
St Leonards	**James Farnell**	
Shoalhaven	John Roseby	Thomas Richards
West Macquarie	**Charles Pilcher**	Alexander Rae
West Maitland	**Henry Cohen**	Thomas Hungerford; Thomas Jones; James Pritchard
Yass Plains	**Michael Fitzpatrick**	Michael Perry; Arthur Remmington
Thursday 1 November 1877
Argyle	William Davies	Charles Heydon
Hartley	**John Hurley (b 1844)**	Patrick Higgins
Williams	**William Johnston**	**John Booth**
Windsor	**Richard Driver**	Charles Cansdell
Friday 2 November 1877
Monaro	John Murphy	**Alexander Montague**
Wellington	John Shepherd	Patrick Jennings; Thomas Wythes
Wollombi	Joseph Eckford	**James Cunneen**; Henry Levien
Saturday 3 November 1877
Clarence	**Thomas Bawden**	Charles Fawcett; Edward Madgwick; John Robertson
Hastings	**Robert Smith**	Thomas Amos
Lachlan	**James Watson**	
Liverpool Plains	**Hanley Bennett**	Michael Burke; George Grehan
New England	**Samuel Terry**	**Robert Forster**
Tenterfield	John Dillon	**Robert Abbott**; Alexander Murray
Upper Hunter	**John McElhone**	John Robertson
Monday 5 November 1877
East Macquarie	John Robertson; **William Suttor**	William Cummings; George Stephen
Gwydir	**Thomas Dangar**	
Hume	**George Day**	Henry Parkes
Mudgee	John Robertson	**Richard Rouse**
Murray	Robert Barbour	James Davidson
Murrumbidgee	**Joseph Leary**	James Gormly; Henry Parkes
Tumut	**James Hoskins**	John Robertson
Tuesday 6 November 1877
University of Sydney	**William Windeyer**	
Monday 12 November 1877
Balranald	Colin Simson	John Smart
Bogan	Walter Coonan	John Ardill; William Forlonge; Henry Parkes; John Robertson; Jean Serisier
Goldfields North	Henry Copeland	
Goldfields South	**Ezekiel Baker**	
Goldfields West	Louis Beyers	**David Buchanan**

== See also ==
- Members of the New South Wales Legislative Assembly, 1877–1880
