= Candidates of the 1880 New South Wales colonial election =

This is a list of candidates for the 1880 New South Wales colonial election. The election was held from 17 November to 2 December 1880.

There was no recognisable party structure at this election.

== Retiring members ==
- William Davies (Argyle)
- James Greenwood (East Sydney)
- John Hurley (b 1796) (Narellan)
- William Long (Parramatta)
- John Lucas (Canterbury)
- John Macintosh (East Sydney)
- James Merriman (West Sydney)
- Henry Moses (Hawkesbury)
- John Murphy (Monaro)
- Arthur Onslow (Camden)
- Colin Simson (Balranald)

== Legislative Assembly ==
Sitting members are shown in bold text. Successful candidates are highlighted.

Electorates are arranged chronologically from the day the poll was held. Because of the sequence of polling, some sitting members who were defeated in their constituencies were then able to contest other constituencies later in the polling period. On the second occasion, these members are shown in italic text.

Electorate	Successful candidates	Unsuccessful candidates
Wednesday 17 November 1880
East Sydney	Henry Dangar; **Sir Henry Parkes**; George Reid; **Arthur Renwick**	Isaac Josephson; Samuel Lees; Charles Moore; Charles Roberts
Thursday 18 November 1880
Glebe	**George Allen**	James Graham
Goulburn	**William Teece**	
Morpeth	**Robert Wisdom**	
Paddington	**William Hezlet**; William Trickett	William Allen; J A Carroll
Parramatta	Charles Byrnes	**Hugh Taylor**
South Sydney	George Carter; **John Davies**; William Poole; George Withers	John Fitzgerald; Edward Horden; Joseph Olliffe; Alexander Steel; Aaron Wheeler
Friday 19 November 1880
Balmain	Jacob Garrard	Albert Elkington; Charles Mossman; John Taylor
Bathurst	**Francis Suttor**	William Butler
Redfern	Alfred Fremlin; John Sutherland	Patrick Hogan; Patrick Stanley
Saturday 20 November 1880
Albury	**George Day**	
Camden	**Thomas Garrett**; John Kidd	**Joseph Leary**; William McCourt; Thomas Robertson
Tumut	**James Hoskins**	William Spicer
Monday 22 November 1880
Canterbury	William Henson; William Pigott	Alfred Allen; Thomas Courtney; Myles McRae; George Moss; George Pile
Carcoar	**Ezekiel Baker**; **Andrew Lynch**	William Suttor
Central Cumberland	**John Lackey**; **Andrew McCulloch**	Thomas Wearne
Durham	**Herbert Brown**	**William Johnston**
Nepean	**Thomas Smith**	
Newcastle	James Fletcher; George Lloyd	**Richard Bowker**; James Ellis
Newtown	**Stephen Brown**; William Foster	Joseph Mitchell; John Young
Queanbeyan	**James Thompson**	Percy Hodgkinson
St Leonards	**James Farnell**	Bernhardt Holtermann
Tenterfield	**John Dillon**	William Christie
West Sydney	Francis Abigail; **Angus Cameron**; William Martin; **Daniel O'Connor**	**David Buchanan**; **John Harris**; John Harris, Sr. Charles Roberts; William Roylance; Thomas White
Young	**James Watson**; William Watson	Patrick Crowe; John Heaton
Tuesday 23 November 1880
Clarence	John Purves	
East Macquarie	**Edward Combes**; **Edmund Webb**	Sydney Smith
Hunter	**John Burns**	John Nowlan
Macleay	**Robert Smith**	
Shoalhaven	**John Roseby**	Frederick Humphery
Yass Plains	**Michael Fitzpatrick**	Henry Dodds
Wednesday 24 November 1880
East Maitland	James Brunker	
Glen Innes	William Fergusson	Edward Bennett
Illawarra	**Alexander Stuart**	
Namoi	**Thomas Dangar**	
Orange	William Clarke; **Andrew Kerr**	Thomas Dalton
Richmond	**Charles Fawcett**	
Wollombi	**Joseph Eckford**	Joseph Gorrick; Robert Higgins
Thursday 25 November 1880
Patrick's Plains	John Brown	**William Browne**
West Maitland	James Fulford	**Henry Cohen**
Friday 26 November 1880
Argyle	William Holborow; Phillip G. Myers	William Connolly; Louis Heydon; John Walsh
Eden	**Henry Clarke**; James Garvan	Alexander Hutchison; W A Manning
Grafton	John See	Richard Stevenson
Hartley	Robert Abbott	**John Hurley (b 1844)**; Walter Targett
Hawkesbury	**Alexander Bowman**	**Henry McQuade**
Molong	Andrew Ross	John Smith
Northumberland	**Ninian Melville**; William Turner	Thomas Dalveen; Thomas Hungerford
Saturday 27 November 1880
Forbes	John Bodel; Henry Cooke	**Walter Coonan**; George Moore; Charles St Baker; Alfred Stokes
Gloucester	**Archibald Jacob**	Charles Readett
Hastings and Manning	Joseph Andrews; James Young	William Gill; Daniel Macquarie; Charles McDonnell; William Richardson; Henry Zions
Kiama	**Harman Tarrant**	
West Macquarie	**Charles Pilcher**	Alfred Pechey
Monday 29 November 1880
Boorowa	Thomas Slattery	Albert Middleton
Braidwood	Alexander Ryrie	**Edward Greville**
Grenfell	Robert Vaughn	J B Donkin; George Greene
Gunnedah	Joseph Abbott	Thomas Browne
Hume	Leyser Levin; William Lyne	Edmund Bond; Philip Gell
Inverell	Richard Murray	G R Maclean
Wellington	**Edmund Barton**	
Tuesday 30 November 1880
Bogan	George Cass; Patrick Jennings	William Forlonge; William Shorter
Bourke	Russell Barton	Joseph Olliffe
Gundagai	William Forster	Frederick Pinkstone; Samuel Swift
Gwydir	William Campbell	
Upper Hunter	**John McElhone**; John McLaughlin	William Clendinning
Wednesday 1 December 1880
Mudgee	**Louis Beyers**; David Buchanan; **Samuel Terry**	Joseph O'Connor; Richard Rouse
Murrumbidgee	James Douglas; George Loughnan	Auber Jones
Thursday 2 December 1880
Balranald	John Cramsie; Robert Wilkinson	John O'Ryan; James Warby
Monaro	Henry Badgery; Robert Tooth	W T Cohen; John Toohey
Murray	William Hay; Alexander Wilson	**Robert Barbour**; Edward Killen
New England	**Henry Copeland**; William Proctor	Jeremiah O'Connell
Tamworth	Sydney Burdekin; Robert Levien	**Hanley Bennett**; Michael Burke
Wentworth	William Brodribb	

== See also ==
- Members of the New South Wales Legislative Assembly, 1880–1882
