= Results of the 1877 New South Wales colonial election =

Colonial election for New South Wales, Australia in 1877

New South Wales colonial election, 24 October – 12 November 1877 Legislative Assembly << 1874–75–1880 >>
Enrolled voters					
Votes cast	98,503		Turnout	48.31	+1.10
Informal votes	680		Informal	1.01	−0.19
Summary of votes by party
Party	Primary votes	%	Swing	Seats	Change
Total	98,503			73	

The 1877 New South Wales colonial election was for 73 members representing 61 electoral districts. The election was conducted on the basis of a simple majority or first-past-the-post voting system. In this election there were 8 multi-member districts returning 20 members and 53 single member districts. In the multi-member districts each elector could vote for as many candidates as there were vacancies. 17 districts were uncontested. There was no recognisable party structure at this election.

There were four districts that did not have a residential or property qualification, Goldfields North (1,200), Goldfields South (1,500), Goldfields West (10,000) and University of Sydney (158). The average number of enrolled voters per seat in the other districts was 2,342 ranging from The Paterson (556) to The Bogan (7,401). The electoral boundaries were established under the Electoral Act 1858 (NSW).

== Election results ==
=== Argyle ===
1877 New South Wales colonial election: Argyle Thursday 1 November
Candidate	Votes	%
William Davies (elected)	890	61.7
Charles Heydon	553	38.3
Total formal votes	1,443	97.5
Informal votes	37	2.5
Turnout	1,480	60.9

=== Balranald ===
1877 New South Wales colonial election: Balranald Monday 12 November
Candidate	Votes	%
Colin Simson (elected)	623	79.8
John Smart	158	20.2
Total formal votes	781	100.0
Informal votes	0	0.0
Turnout	797	23.2

=== Bathurst ===
1877 New South Wales colonial election: Bathurst Monday 29 October
Candidate	Votes	%
Francis Suttor (re-elected)	551	64.1
David Williamson	308	35.9
Total formal votes	859	98.1
Informal votes	17	1.9
Turnout	876	51.9

=== The Bogan ===
1877 New South Wales colonial election: The Bogan Monday 12 November
Candidate	Votes	%
Walter Coonan (elected)	1,248	51.8
Sir John Robertson	1,020	42.3
Sir Henry Parkes	117	4.9
John Ardill	12	0.5
William Forlonge	7	0.3
Jean Serisier	5	0.2
Total formal votes	2,409	97.1
Informal votes	72	2.9
Turnout	2,481	33.5

=== Braidwood ===
1877 New South Wales colonial election: Braidwood Wednesday 31 October
Candidate	Votes	%
Edward Greville (re-elected)	unopposed	

=== Camden ===
1877 New South Wales colonial election: Camden Tuesday 30 October
Candidate	Votes	%
Thomas Garrett (re-elected 1)	762	41.4
Arthur Onslow (re-elected 2)	683	37.1
Thomas Fisher	397	21.6
Total formal votes	1,842	100.0
Informal votes	0	0.0
Turnout	1,255	53.1

=== Canterbury ===
1877 New South Wales colonial election: Canterbury Monday 29 October
Candidate	Votes	%
Sir Henry Parkes (elected 1)	1,841	28.4
John Lucas (re-elected 2)	1,645	25.4
Richard Hill (defeated)	1,443	22.3
George Pile	969	14.9
William Henson	588	9.1
Total formal votes	6,486	100.0
Informal votes	0	0.0
Turnout	6,486	49.2

=== Carcoar ===
1877 New South Wales colonial election: Carcoar Tuesday 30 October
Candidate	Votes	%
Andrew Lynch (re-elected)	unopposed	

=== The Clarence ===
1877 New South Wales colonial election: The Clarence Saturday 3 November
Candidate	Votes	%
Thomas Bawden (re-elected)	1,161	42.2
Charles Fawcett	1,126	41.0
Edward Madgwick	286	10.4
Sir John Robertson	176	6.4
Total formal votes	2,749	98.4
Informal votes	46	1.7
Turnout	2,795	59.7

=== Central Cumberland ===
1877 New South Wales colonial election: Central Cumberland Monday 29 October
Candidate	Votes	%
John Lackey (re-elected)	unopposed	
Andrew McCulloch (elected)	unopposed	

The other sitting member William Long successfully contested Parramatta.

=== East Macquarie ===
1877 New South Wales colonial election: East Macquarie Monday 5 November
Candidate	Votes	%
Sir John Robertson (elected 1)	781	38.5
William Suttor (re-elected 2)	627	30.9
William Cummings	515	25.4
George Stephen	105	5.2
Total formal votes	2,028	99.0
Informal votes	21	1.0
Turnout	1,307	63.4

=== East Maitland ===
1877 New South Wales colonial election: East Maitland Wednesday 31 October
Candidate	Votes	%
Stephen Scholey (re-elected)	268	50.2
Alexander Dodds	266	49.8
Total formal votes	534	99.1
Informal votes	5	0.9
Turnout	539	70.2

=== East Sydney ===
1877 New South Wales colonial election: East Sydney Wednesday 24 October
Candidate	Votes	%
John Macintosh (re-elected 1)	4,112	19.0
John Davies (re-elected 2)	3,761	17.4
James Greenwood (elected 3)	3,493	16.1
Alexander Stuart (re-elected 4)	2,930	13.5
Sir Henry Parkes (defeated)	2,843	13.1
Sedgwick Cowper	1,335	6.2
Francis Dixon	1,302	6.0
Isaac Josephson	1,029	4.8
Ninian Melville	540	2.5
Josiah Mason	173	0.8
William Cover	77	0.4
George Perry	60	0.3
Total formal votes	21,655	100.0
Informal votes	0	0.0
Turnout	7,156	54.1

=== Eden ===
1877 New South Wales colonial election: Eden Tuesday 30 October
Candidate	Votes	%
Henry Clarke (re-elected)	825	69.6
Sir Henry Parkes	361	30.4
Total formal votes	1,186	100.0
Informal votes	0	0.0
Turnout	1,216	54.5

=== The Glebe ===
1877 New South Wales colonial election: The Glebe Monday 29 October
Candidate	Votes	%
George Allen (re-elected)	1,179	64.8
Charles Mossman	641	35.2
Total formal votes	1,820	97.9
Informal votes	39	2.1
Turnout	1,859	55.2

=== Goldfields South ===
1877 New South Wales colonial election: Goldfields South Monday 12 November
Candidate	Votes	%
Ezekiel Baker (re-elected)	unopposed	

=== Goldfields West ===
1877 New South Wales colonial election: Goldfields West Monday 12 November
Candidate	Votes	%
Louis Beyers (elected)	476	57.9
David Buchanan (defeated)	346	42.1
Total formal votes	822	97.9
Informal votes	18	2.1
Turnout	840	8.4

=== Goldfields North ===
1877 New South Wales colonial election: Goldfields North Monday 12 November
Candidate	Votes	%
Henry Copeland (elected)	unopposed	

=== Goulburn ===
1877 New South Wales colonial election: Goulburn Friday 26 October
Candidate	Votes	%
William Teece (re-elected)	400	62.8
Frederick Horn	237	37.2
Total formal votes	637	97.7
Informal votes	15	2.3
Turnout	652	65.7

=== The Gwydir ===
1877 New South Wales colonial election: The Gwydir Monday 5 November
Candidate	Votes	%
Thomas Dangar (re-elected)	unopposed	

=== Hartley ===
1877 New South Wales colonial election: Hartley Thursday 1 November
Candidate	Votes	%
John Hurley (b 1844) (re-elected)	695	57.8
Patrick Higgins	508	42.2
Total formal votes	1,203	97.8
Informal votes	27	2.2
Turnout	1,230	63.0

=== The Hastings ===
1877 New South Wales colonial election: The Hastings Saturday 3 November
Candidate	Votes	%
Robert Smith (re-elected)	1,018	94.2
Thomas Amos	63	5.8
Total formal votes	1,081	100.0
Informal votes	0	0.0
Turnout	1,093	34.5

=== The Hawkesbury ===
1877 New South Wales colonial election: The Hawkesbury Tuesday 30 October
Candidate	Votes	%
Alexander Bowman (elected 1)	462	33.0
Henry Moses (re-elected 2)	383	27.3
William Piddington (defeated)	283	20.2
Thomas Primrose	177	12.6
George Davies	96	6.9
Total formal votes	1,401	100.0
Informal votes	0	0.0
Turnout	1,401	50.8

=== The Hume ===
1877 New South Wales colonial election: The Hume Monday 5 November
Candidate	Votes	%
George Day (re-elected)	461	97.7
Sir Henry Parkes	11	2.3
Total formal votes	472	100.0
Informal votes	0	0.0
Turnout	484	15.4

=== The Hunter ===
1877 New South Wales colonial election: The Hunter Tuesday 30 October
Candidate	Votes	%
John Burns (re-elected)	unopposed	

=== Illawarra ===
1877 New South Wales colonial election: Illawarra Monday 29 October
Candidate	Votes	%
Samuel Gray (re-elected)	unopposed	

=== Kiama ===
1877 New South Wales colonial election: Kiama Monday 29 October
Candidate	Votes	%
Samuel Charles (re-elected)	unopposed	

=== The Lachlan ===
1877 New South Wales colonial election: The Lachlan Saturday 3 November
Candidate	Votes	%
James Watson (re-elected)	unopposed	

=== Liverpool Plains ===
1877 New South Wales colonial election: Liverpool Plains Saturday 3 November
Candidate	Votes	%
Hanley Bennett (re-elected)	703	42.5
Michael Burke	536	32.4
George Grehan	415	25.1
Total formal votes	1,654	100.0
Informal votes	0	0.0
Turnout	1,654	36.4

=== The Lower Hunter ===
1877 New South Wales colonial election: The Lower Hunter Tuesday 30 October
Candidate	Votes	%
Archibald Jacob (re-elected)	unopposed	

=== Monara ===
1877 New South Wales colonial election: Monara Friday 2 November
Candidate	Votes	%
John Murphy (elected)	768	59.6
Alexander Montague (defeated)	521	40.4
Total formal votes	1,289	100.0
Informal votes	0	0.0
Turnout	1,289	54.0

=== Morpeth ===
1877 New South Wales colonial election: Morpeth Monday 29 October
Candidate	Votes	%
Robert Wisdom (re-elected)	unopposed	

=== Mudgee ===
1877 New South Wales colonial election: Mudgee Monday 5 November
Candidate	Votes	%
Sir John Robertson (elected)	1,142	53.7
Richard Rouse (defeated)	985	46.3
Total formal votes	2,127	100.0
Informal votes	0	0.0
Turnout	2,130	44.4

=== The Murray ===
1877 New South Wales colonial election: The Murray Monday 5 November
Candidate	Votes	%
Robert Barbour (elected)	815	51.9
James Davidson	754	48.1
Total formal votes	1,569	97.4
Informal votes	42	2.6
Turnout	1,611	62.9

=== The Murrumbidgee ===
1877 New South Wales colonial election: The Murrumbidgee Monday 5 November
Candidate	Votes	%
Joseph Leary (re-elected)	531	36.7
Henry Parkes	468	32.4
James Gormly	447	30.9
Total formal votes	1,446	100.0
Informal votes	0	0.0
Turnout	1,483	32.3

=== Narellan ===
1877 New South Wales colonial election: Narellan Saturday 27 October
Candidate	Votes	%
John Hurley (b 1796) (re-elected)	244	57.3
John Kidd	182	42.7
Total formal votes	426	100.0
Informal votes	0	0.0
Turnout	426	74.6

=== The Nepean ===
1877 New South Wales colonial election: The Nepean Monday 29 October
Candidate	Votes	%
Thomas Smith (elected)	520	60.9
John Smith (defeated)	334	39.1
Total formal votes	854	100.0
Informal votes	0	0.0
Turnout	854	74.0

The sitting member was Patrick Shepherd who did not contest the election. John Smith was the sitting member for Wellington.

=== New England ===
1877 New South Wales colonial election: New England Saturday 3 November
Candidate	Votes	%
Samuel Terry (re-elected)	736	58.6
Robert Forster (defeated)	521	41.5
Total formal votes	1,257	96.8
Informal votes	42	3.2
Turnout	1,299	49.2

=== Newcastle ===
1877 New South Wales colonial election: Newcastle Friday 26 October
Candidate	Votes	%
Richard Bowker (elected)	784	54.7
George Lloyd (defeated)	402	28.0
Thomas Hungerford	230	16.0
William Brookes	18	1.3
Total formal votes	1,434	98.4
Informal votes	24	1.7
Turnout	1,458	77.1

=== Newtown ===
1877 New South Wales colonial election: Newtown Saturday 27 October
Candidate	Votes	%
Stephen Brown (re-elected)	1,083	82.7
James Yeomans	227	17.3
Total formal votes	1,310	100.0
Informal votes	0	0.0
Turnout	1,310	39.3

=== Northumberland ===
1877 New South Wales colonial election: Northumberland Monday 29 October
Candidate	Votes	%
Thomas Hungerford (elected)	1,580	50.7
William Turner (defeated)	1,534	49.3
Total formal votes	3,114	97.7
Informal votes	75	2.4
Turnout	3,189	72.7

=== Orange ===
1877 New South Wales colonial election: Orange Friday 26 October
Candidate	Votes	%
Edward Combes (re-elected)	unopposed	

=== Paddington ===
1877 New South Wales colonial election: Paddington Friday 26 October
Candidate	Votes	%
John Sutherland (re-elected)	unopposed	

=== Parramatta ===
1877 New South Wales colonial election: Parramatta Saturday 27 October
Candidate	Votes	%
Hugh Taylor (re-elected 1)	571	33.9
William Long (re-elected 2)	426	25.3
Walter Cooper	370	22.0
George Young	265	15.8
John Bergan	51	3.0
Total formal votes	1,683	98.9
Informal votes	19	1.1
Turnout	988	85.7

The other sitting member Charles Byrnes did not contest the election. William Long was the member for Central Cumberland.

=== The Paterson ===
1877 New South Wales colonial election: The Paterson Saturday 27 October
Candidate	Votes	%
Herbert Brown (re-elected)	unopposed	

=== Patrick's Plains ===
1877 New South Wales colonial election: Patrick's Plains Tuesday 30 October
Candidate	Votes	%
William Browne (re-elected)	468	63.6
William Durham	268	36.4
Total formal votes	736	97.1
Informal votes	22	2.9
Turnout	758	52.8

=== Queanbeyan ===
1877 New South Wales colonial election: Queanbeyan Monday 29 October
Candidate	Votes	%
James Thompson (elected)	446	49.8
Thomas Rutledge	337	37.7
William O'Neill	112	12.5
Total formal votes	895	98.4
Informal votes	15	1.7
Turnout	910	67.4

=== Shoalhaven ===
1877 New South Wales colonial election: Shoalhaven Wednesday 31 October
Candidate	Votes	%
John Roseby (elected)	591	50.5
Thomas Richards	579	49.5
Total formal votes	1,170	100.0
Informal votes	0	0.0
Turnout	1,193	76.6

=== St Leonards ===
1877 New South Wales colonial election: St Leonards Wednesday 31 October
Candidate	Votes	%
James Farnell (re-elected)	unopposed	

=== Tenterfield ===
1877 New South Wales colonial election: Tenterfield Saturday 3 November
Candidate	Votes	%
John Dillon (elected)	642	40.9
Robert Abbott (defeated)	518	33.0
Alexander Murray	410	26.1
Total formal votes	1,570	97.3
Informal votes	44	2.7
Turnout	1,614	38.3

=== The Tumut ===
1877 New South Wales colonial election: The Tumut Monday 5 November
Candidate	Votes	%
James Hoskins (re-elected)	557	60.6
Sir John Robertson	362	39.4
Total formal votes	919	100.0
Informal votes	0	0.0
Turnout	937	42.4

=== University of Sydney ===
1877 New South Wales colonial election: University of Sydney Tuesday 6 November
Candidate	Votes	%
William Windeyer (re-elected)	unopposed	

=== The Upper Hunter ===
1877 New South Wales colonial election: The Upper Hunter Saturday 3 November
Candidate	Votes	%
John McElhone (re-elected)	1,169	71.9
Sir John Robertson	456	28.1
Total formal votes	1,625	100.0
Informal votes	0	0.0
Turnout	1,651	50.4

=== Wellington ===
1877 New South Wales colonial election: Wellington Friday 2 November
Candidate	Votes	%
John Shepherd (elected)	741	50.2
Patrick Jennings	595	40.3
Thomas Wythes	139	9.4
Total formal votes	1,475	99.4
Informal votes	9	0.6
Turnout	1,521	60.9

The sitting member was John Smith who unsuccessfully contested Nepean.

=== West Macquarie ===
1877 New South Wales colonial election: West Macquarie Wednesday 31 October
Candidate	Votes	%
Charles Pilcher (re-elected)	314	59.3
Alexander Rae	216	40.8
Total formal votes	530	98.0
Informal votes	11	2.0
Turnout	541	47.3

=== West Maitland ===
1877 New South Wales colonial election: West Maitland Wednesday 31 October
Candidate	Votes	%
Henry Cohen (re-elected)	397	55.6
James Pritchard	304	42.6
Thomas Hungerford	7	1.0
Thomas Jones	6	0.8
Total formal votes	714	98.2
Informal votes	13	1.8
Turnout	727	67.2

=== West Sydney ===
1877 New South Wales colonial election: West Sydney Thursday 25 October
Candidate	Votes	%
James Merriman (elected 1)	2,929	15.9
Angus Cameron (re-elected 2)	2,373	12.9
Daniel O'Connor (elected 3)	2,249	12.2
John Harris (elected 4)	2,117	11.5
Henry Dangar (defeated)	2,010	10.9
Sir John Robertson (defeated)	1,892	10.3
Thomas White	1,602	8.7
George Dibbs (defeated)	1,394	7.6
Jacob Garrard	675	3.7
Benjamin Palmer	627	3.4
Joseph O'Connor	404	2.2
Archibald Hamilton	111	0.6
Henry Fisher	74	0.4
Total formal votes	18,457	100.0
Informal votes	0	0.0
Turnout	6,542	64.8

=== The Williams ===
1877 New South Wales colonial election: The Williams Thursday 1 November
Candidate	Votes	%
William Johnston (re-elected)	516	51.0
John Booth (defeated)	495	49.0
Total formal votes	1,011	96.1
Informal votes	41	3.9
Turnout	1,052	70.7

William Johnston had won the seat at the 1877 by-election. John Booth was one of the sitting members for East Macquarie.

=== Windsor ===
1877 New South Wales colonial election: Windsor Thursday 1 November
Candidate	Votes	%
Richard Driver (re-elected)	327	72.2
Charles Cansdell	126	27.8
Total formal votes	453	100.0
Informal votes	0	0.0
Turnout	453	74.0

=== Wollombi ===
1877 New South Wales colonial election: Wollombi Friday 2 November
Candidate	Votes	%
Joseph Eckford (elected)	237	36.6
Henry Levien	236	36.5
James Cunneen (defeated)	174	26.9
Total formal votes	647	100.0
Informal votes	0	0.0
Turnout	647	60.6

=== Yass Plains ===
1877 New South Wales colonial election: Yass Plains Wednesday 31 October
Candidate	Votes	%
Michael Fitzpatrick (re-elected)	382	52.3
Michael Perry	327	44.8
Arthur Remmington	21	2.9
Total formal votes	730	96.6
Informal votes	26	3.4
Turnout	756	43.6

== See also ==
- Candidates of the 1877 New South Wales colonial election
- Members of the New South Wales Legislative Assembly, 1877–1880
