= Members of the New South Wales Legislative Assembly, 1880–1882 =

Members of the New South Wales Legislative Assembly who served in the 10th parliament of New South Wales held their seats from 1880 to 1882. Elections for the tenth Legislative Assembly were held between 17 November and 10 December 1880 with parliament first meeting on 15 December 1880. Electoral reforms passed by the ninth parliament had resulted in parliament being expanded to 108 members elected in 43 single member electorates, 25 two member electorates, 1 three member electorate and 3 four member electorates. In addition, electorates franchised on qualifications of occupation or education (Goldfields North, Goldfields South, Goldfields West and University of Sydney) had been abolished. The parliament had a maximum term of 3 years but was dissolved after 23 months. Sir Henry Parkes continued as the Premier for the duration of the parliament. The Speaker was Sir George Allen.

Name	Electorate	Years in office
Joseph Abbott	Gunnedah	1880–1901
Robert Abbott	Hartley	1872–1877, 1880–1882
Francis Abigail	West Sydney	1880–1891
Sir George Allen	Glebe	1869–1883
Joseph Andrews	Hastings and Manning	1880–1882
Henry Badgery	Monaro	1878–1885
Ezekiel Baker (Note: Carcoar MLA Ezekiel Baker was expelled from the Assembly after he had been found to have fraudulently dealt with trust funds. The resulting by-election was won by George Campbell on 1 December 1881.)	Carcoar	1870–1877, 1879–1881, 1884–1887
Edmund Barton	Wellington	1879–1887, 1891–1894, 1898–1900
Russell Barton	Bourke	1880–1886
Louis Beyers	Mudgee	1877–1882
John Bodel	Forbes	1880–1882
Alexander Bowman	Hawkesbury	1877–1882, 1885–1892
William Brodribb (Note: Wentworth MLA William Brodribb was elevated to the Legislative Council in January 1882. The resulting by-election on 23 January 1882 was won by Edward Quin.)	Wentworth	1880–1881
Herbert Brown	Durham	1875–1898
John Brown	Patrick's Plains	1880–1882
Stephen Brown (Note: Newtown MLA Stephen Brown was elevated to the Legislative Council in November 1881. The resulting by-election on 1 December 1881 was won by Joseph Mitchell.)	Newtown	1864–1881
James Brunker	East Maitland	1880–1904
David Buchanan	Mudgee	1860–1862, 1864–1867, 1869–1877, 1879–1885, 1888–1889
Sydney Burdekin	Tamworth	1880–1882, 1884–1891, 1892–1894
John Burns	Hunter	1861–1869, 1872–1891
Charles Byrnes	Parramatta	1874–1877, 1880–1882
Angus Cameron	West Sydney	1874–1889, 1894–1896
George Campbell	Carcoar	1881–1885
William Campbell	Gwydir	1868–1869, 1880–1886
George Carter	South Sydney	1880–1882
George Cass	Bogan	1880–1892
Henry Clarke	Eden	1869–1894, 1895–1904
William Clarke	Orange	1880–1889
Edward Combes	East Macquarie	1872–1874, 1877–1885
Henry Cooke	Forbes	1880–1882, 1887–1891
Henry Copeland	New England	1877–1883, 1883–1895, 1895–1900
John Cramsie	Balranald	1880–1887
Henry Dangar	East Sydney	1874–1877, 1880–1882
Thomas Dangar	Namoi	1865–1885, 1887–1890
John Davies	South Sydney	1874–1887
George Day	Albury	1874–1889
John Dillon (Note: Tenterfield MLA John Dillon resigned in January 1882. The resulting by-election was won by Augustus Fraser on 6 February 1882.)	Tenterfield	1869–1872, 1877–1882
James Douglas	Murrumbidgee	1880–1882
Joseph Eckford	Wollombi	1860–1872, 1877–1882
James Farnell	St Leonards	1860–1860, 1864–1885, 1887–1888
Charles Fawcett	Richmond	1880–1882
William Fergusson	Glen Innes	1880–1887
Michael Fitzpatrick (Note: Yass Plains MLA Michael Fitzpatrick died on 10 December 1881. The resulting by-election was won by Louis Heydon on 10 January 1882.)	Yass Plains	1869–1881
James Fletcher	Newcastle	1880–1891
William Forster (Note: Gundagai MLA William Forster died on 30 October 1882. The resulting by-election on 23 November 1882 was won by Bruce Smith.)	Gundagai	1856–1860, 1861–1864, 1864–1869, 1869–1874, 1875–1876, 1880–1882
William Foster	Newtown	1880–1888
Augustus Fraser	Tenterfield	1882
Alfred Fremlin	Redfern	1880–1885
James Fulford	West Maitland	1880–1882
John Gannon (Note: Argyle MLA Phillip G. Myers died on 16 November 1881. The resulting by-election was won by John Gannon on 9 December 1881.)	Argyle	1881–1885
Jacob Garrard	Balmain	1880–1898
Thomas Garrett	Camden	1860–1871, 1872–1891
James Garvan	Eden	1880–1894
William Hay	Murray	1872–1877, 1880–1882
William Henson	Canterbury	1880–1882, 1885–1889
Louis Heydon	Yass Plains	1882–1886
William Hezlet	Paddington	1880–1882
William Holborow	Argyle	1880–1894
Bernhardt Holtermann	St Leonards	1882–1885
James Hoskins (Note: Tumut MLA James Hoskins resigned in September 1882 to take a recuperative sea voyage. The resulting by-election on 17 October 1882 was won by Thomas O'Mara.)	Tumut	1859–1863, 1868–1882
Thomas Hungerford (Note: Northumberland MLA William Turner resigned in January 1882. He was a candidate supported by the local coal miners, however the miner's subscriptions were insufficient for him to stay in the Assembly. The resulting by-election was won by Thomas Hungerford on 18 January 1882.)	Northumberland	1875, 1877–1882, 1885–1887
Archibald Jacob	Gloucester	1872–1882
Sir Patrick Jennings	Bogan	1869–1872, 1880–1887
Andrew Kerr	Orange	1879–1882
John Kidd	Camden	1880–1882, 1885–1887, 1889–1904
John Lackey	Central Cumberland	1860–1864, 1867–1880
Robert Levien	Tamworth	1880–1889, 1889–1913
Leyser Levin	Hume	1880–1885
George Lloyd	Newcastle	1869–1877, 1880–1882, 1885–1887
George Loughnan	Murrumbidgee	1880–1885
Andrew Lynch	Carcoar	1876–1884
William Lyne	Hume	1880–1901
William Martin	West Sydney	1880–1882, 1887–1889
Andrew McCulloch	Central Cumberland	1877–1888
John McElhone	Upper Hunter	1875–1889, 1895–1898
John McLaughlin	Upper Hunter	1880–1885, 1895–1901
Ninian Melville	Northumberland	1880–1887, 1889–1894
Joseph Mitchell	Newtown	1881–1885, 1888–1891
Richard Murray	Inverell	1880–1885
Phillip G. Myers	Argyle	1880–1881
Daniel O'Connor	West Sydney	1877–1891, 1900–1904
Thomas O'Mara	Tumut	1882–1885, 1887–1889
Sir Henry Parkes	East Sydney	1856, 1858, 1859–1861, 1864–1870, 1872–1895
Alfred Pechey (Note: East Macquarie MLA Edmund Webb was elevated to the Legislative Council in January 1882. The resulting by-election on 19 January 1882 was won by Alfred Pechey.) (Note: East Macquarie MLA Alfred Pechey died on 5 June 1882. The resulting by-election on 11 July 1882 was won by Sydney Smith.)	East Macquarie	1882-1882
William Pigott	Canterbury	1880–1884
Charles Pilcher	West Macquarie	1874–1882
William Poole	South Sydney	1880–1885
William Proctor	New England	1880–1887
John Purves	Clarence	1880–1887
Edward Quin	Wentworth	1882–1887
George Reid	East Sydney	1880–1884, 1885–1901
Arthur Renwick	East Sydney	1879–1882, 1885–1887
Sir John Robertson (Note: Mudgee MLA Samuel Terry was elevated to the Legislative Council in December 1881. The resulting by-election on 20 January 1882 was won by John Robertson.)	Mudgee	1856–1861, 1862–1865, 1865–1866, 1866–1870, 1870–1877, 1877–1878, 1882–1886
John Roseby	Shoalhaven	1877–1882
Andrew Ross	Molong	1880–1904
Thomas Rutledge (Note: Queanbeyan MLA James Thompson resigned in January 1881. The resulting by-election on 21 January 1881 was won by Thomas Rutledge.)	Queanbeyan	1881–1882
Alexander Ryrie	Braidwood	1880–1891
John See	Grafton	1880–1904
Thomas Slattery	Boorowa	1880–1885, 1887–1895
Bruce Smith	Gundagai	1882–1884, 1889–1894
Robert Smith	Macleay	1870–1889
Sydney Smith	East Macquarie	1882–1898, 1900
Thomas Smith	Nepean	1877–1887, 1895–1904
Alexander Stuart	Illawarra	1874–1885
Francis Suttor	Bathurst	1875–1890
John Sutherland (Note: Redfern MLA John Sutherland was elevated to the Legislative Council in December 1881. The resulting by-election on 11 January 1882 was won by Francis Wright.)	Redfern	1860–1881, 1882–1889
Harman Tarrant	Kiama	1880–1887
William Teece	Goulburn	1872–1880
Samuel Terry	Mudgee	1859–1869, 1871–1881
James Thompson	Queanbeyan	1877–1881
Robert Tooth	Monaro	1880–1884
William Trickett	Paddington	1880–1885, 1887
William Turner	Northumberland	1877, 1880–1881
Robert Vaughn	Grenfell	1880–1889, 1891–1894
James Watson	Young	1869–1882, 1884–1885
William Watson	Young	1880–1885
Edmund Webb	East Macquarie	1869–1874, 1878–1881
Robert Wilkinson	Balranald	1880–1894
Alexander Wilson	Murray	1880–1885, 1887–1889
Robert Wisdom	Morpeth	1859–1872, 1874–1887
George Withers	South Sydney	1880–1885, 1887–1889
Francis Wright	Redfern	1882–1885, 1889–1903
James Young	Hastings and Manning	1880–1901, 1904–1907

== See also ==
- Third Parkes ministry
- Results of the 1880 New South Wales colonial election
- Candidates of the 1880 New South Wales colonial election

== Notes ==
There was no party system in New South Wales politics until 1887. Under the constitution, ministers were required to resign to recontest their seats in a by-election when appointed. These by-elections are only noted when the minister was defeated; in general, he was elected unopposed.
