= 1879 East Macquarie colonial by-election =

By-election in New South Wales, Australia

A by-election was held for the New South Wales Legislative Assembly electorate of East Macquarie on 15 August 1879 because of the resignation of William Suttor Jr.

== Dates ==
Date	Event
23 July 1879	William Suttor Jr resigned.
24 July 1879	Writ of election issued by the Speaker of the Legislative Assembly.
11 August 1879	Nominations
5 August 1879	Polling day
29 August 1879	Return of writ

== Candidates ==
- Edward Combes had been the member for Orange, until his seat was declared vacant because the Elections and Qualifications Committee held that his position of Executive Commissioner for New South Wales at the Paris International Exhibition was an office of profit under the crown.
- Thomas Dalveen was a publican from Bathurst. This was his third attempt at election, having previously been unsuccessful at East Macquarie in 1878, and Orange in March 1879. He would stand four more times over the following four years, but was unsuccessful on each occasion.

== Result ==
1879 East Macquarie by-election Friday 15 August
Candidate	Votes	%
Edward Combes (elected)	784	72.1
Thomas Dalveen	303	27.9
Total formal votes	1,087	100.0
Informal votes	0	0.0
Turnout	1,087	51.5

== See also ==
- Electoral results for the district of East Macquarie
- List of New South Wales state by-elections
