= Electoral results for the district of Narellan =

Election results for Narellan, New South Wales, Australia

Narellan, an electoral district of the Legislative Assembly in the Australian state of New South Wales was created in 1859 and abolished in 1880.

Election	Member	Party
1859	John Hurley	None
1860	Joseph Leary	None
1864	John Hurley	None
1869	Joseph Leary	None
1872	John Hurley	None
1874	John Hurley	None
1877	John Hurley	None

== Election results ==
=== Elections in the 1870s ===
==== 1877 ====
1877 New South Wales colonial election: Narellan Saturday 27 October
Candidate	Votes	%
John Hurley (re-elected)	244	57.3
John Kidd	182	42.7
Total formal votes	426	100.0
Informal votes	0	0.0
Turnout	426	74.6

==== 1874 ====
1874–75 New South Wales colonial election: Narellan Thursday 17 December 1874
Candidate	Votes	%
John Hurley (re-elected)	unopposed	

==== 1872 ====
1872 New South Wales colonial election: Narellan Monday 4 March
Candidate	Votes	%
John Hurley (elected)	261	52.6
Joseph Leary (defeated)	231	46.6
William Walker	4	0.8
Total formal votes	496	100.0
Informal votes	0	0.0
Turnout	497	73.7

=== Elections in the 1860s ===
==== 1869 ====
1869–70 New South Wales colonial election: Narellan Friday 17 December 1869
Candidate	Votes	%
Joseph Leary (elected)	226	51.6
John Hurley (defeated)	212	48.4
Total formal votes	438	100.0
Informal votes	0	0.0
Turnout	438	68.7

==== 1864 ====
1864–65 New South Wales colonial election: Narellan Saturday 17 December 1864
Candidate	Votes	%
John Hurley (elected)	259	55.0
Joseph Leary (defeated)	212	45.0
Total formal votes	471	98.7
Informal votes	6	1.3
Turnout	477	67.0

==== 1860 ====
1860 New South Wales colonial election: Narellan Thursday 20 December
Candidate	Votes	%
Joseph Leary (elected)	275	51.9
John Hurley (defeated)	255	48.1
Total formal votes	530	98.0
Informal votes	11	2.0
Turnout	541	61.3

=== Elections in the 1850s ===
==== 1859 ====
1859 New South Wales colonial election: Narellan Monday 27 June
Candidate	Votes	%
John Hurley (elected)	311	61.0
John Oxley	199	39.0
Total formal votes	510	100.0
Informal votes	0	0.0
Turnout	510	73.0
