= 1882 East Macquarie colonial by-election =

1882 East Macquarie colonial by-election may refer to

- 1882 East Macquarie colonial by-election 1 held on 19 January 1882
- 1882 East Macquarie colonial by-election 2 held on 11 July 1882

== See also ==
- List of New South Wales state by-elections
