= 1867 East Macquarie colonial by-election =

By-election in New South Wales, Australia

A by-election was held for the New South Wales Legislative Assembly electorate of East Macquarie on 26 August 1867 because of the resignation of David Buchanan to return to Scotland.

== Dates ==
Date	Event
1 August 1867	David Buchanan resigned.
1 August 1867	Writ of election issued by the Speaker of the Legislative Assembly.
15 August 1867	Nominations
26 August 1867	Polling day
10 September 1867	Return of writ

== Result ==
1867 East Macquarie by-election Monday 26 August
Candidate	Votes	%
John Suttor (elected)	914	70.7
Robert Forster	378	29.3
Total formal votes	1,292	37.8
Informal votes	43	3.2
Turnout	1,335	63.0

== See also ==
- Electoral results for the district of East Macquarie
- List of New South Wales state by-elections
