= July 1882 East Macquarie colonial by-election =

By-election in New South Wales, Australia

A by-election was held for the New South Wales Legislative Assembly electorate of East Macquarie on 11 July 1882 because Alfred Pechey, who was elected at the January by-election, had died four months later without taking his seat.

== Dates ==
Date	Event
5 June 1882	Alfred Pechey died.
12 June 1882	Writ of election issued by the Speaker of the Legislative Assembly.
4 July 1882	Nominations
11 July 1882	Polling day
25 July 1882	Return of writ

== Result ==
July 1882 East Macquarie by-election Tuesday 11 July
Candidate	Votes	%
Sydney Smith (elected)	710	54.7
Robert Thompson	589	45.3
Total formal votes	1,299	98.3
Informal votes	22	1.7
Turnout	1,321	64.1

== See also ==
- Electoral results for the district of East Macquarie
- List of New South Wales state by-elections
