= William Suttor =

William Suttor may refer to:

- William Henry Suttor, Australian pastoralist and politician
- William Suttor Jr, his son, Australian politician and pastoralist
