= 1873 East Macquarie colonial by-election =

By-election in New South Wales, Australia

A by-election was held for the New South Wales Legislative Assembly electorate of East Macquarie on 1 December 1873 because Sir James Martin's seat was declared vacant on accepting appointment as Chief Justice of New South Wales.

== Dates ==
Date	Event
11 November 1873	Sir James Martin's seat declared vacant.
12 November 1873	Writ of election issued by the Speaker of the Legislative Assembly.
24 November 1873	Nominations
1 December 1873	Polling day
16 December 1873	Return of writ

== Result ==
1873 East Macquarie by-election Monday 1 December
Candidate	Votes	%
Walter Cooper (elected)	513	46.8
Henry Rotton	357	32.5
Bernhardt Holtermann	224	20.4
John Smeed	3	0.3
Total formal votes	1,097	94.7
Informal votes	61	5.3
Turnout	1,158	39.2

== See also ==
- Electoral results for the district of East Macquarie
- List of New South Wales state by-elections
