= 1878 East Macquarie colonial by-election =

By-election in New South Wales, Australia

A by-election was held for the New South Wales Legislative Assembly electorate of East Macquarie on 1 February 1878 because of the resignation of Sir John Robertson who had also been elected to Mudgee on the same day.

== Dates ==
Date	Event
14 January 1878	Writ of election issued by the Speaker of the Legislative Assembly.
28 January 1878	Nominations
1 February 1878	Polling day
12 February 1878	Return of writ

== Result ==
1878 East Macquarie by-election Friday 1 February
Candidate	Votes	%
Edmund Webb (elected)	556	61.0
Thomas Dalveen	356	39.0
Total formal votes	912	97.7
Informal votes	21	2.3
Turnout	933	45.2

== See also ==
- Electoral results for the district of East Macquarie
- List of New South Wales state by-elections
