= January 1882 East Macquarie colonial by-election =

By-election in New South Wales, Australia

A by-election was held for the New South Wales Legislative Assembly electorate of East Macquarie on 19 January 1882 because Edmund Webb resigned to accept appointment to the Legislative Council.

Webb, William Brodribb, John Sutherland and Samuel Terry were appointed to the Legislative Council at the same time, and the by-elections for Mudgee, Redfern and Wentworth were held between 11 and 23 January.

== Dates ==
Date	Event
29 December 1881	Edmund Webb resigned.
29 December 1881	Writ of election issued by the Speaker of the Legislative Assembly.
13 January 1882	Nominations
19 January 1882	Polling day
31 January 1882	Return of writ

== Result ==
January 1882 East Macquarie by-election Thursday 19 January
Candidate	Votes	%
Alfred Pechey (elected)	423	35.1
Sydney Smith	375	31.1
Charles Roberts	357	29.6
Thomas Dalveen	50	4.2
Total formal votes	1,205	96.8
Informal votes	40	3.2
Turnout	1,245	60.1

== See also ==
- Electoral results for the district of East Macquarie
- List of New South Wales state by-elections
