= 1892 East Macquarie colonial by-election =

By-election in New South Wales, Australia

A by-election was held for the New South Wales Legislative Assembly electorate of East Macquarie on 13 August 1892 because James Tonkin (Free Trade) resigned due to bankruptcy.

== Dates ==
Date	Event
21 July 1892	James Tonkin declared bankrupt, and resigned.
26 July 1892	Writ of election issued by the Speaker of the Legislative Assembly.
3 August 1892	Nominations
13 August 1892	Polling day
27 August 1892	Return of writ

== Result ==
1892 East Macquarie by-election Saturday 13 August
Party	Candidate	Votes	%	±%
Free Trade	James Tonkin (re-elected)	845	61.5	
Protectionist	John Boyd	528	38.5	
Total formal votes		1,373	97.6	−1.9
Informal votes		33	2.4	+1.9
Turnout		1,406	54.1 (Note: Estimate based on an electoral roll of 2,600 at the 1891 election.)	−8.3
Free Trade hold				

== See also ==
- Electoral results for the district of East Macquarie
- List of New South Wales state by-elections
