= Presbyterian High School, Maitland =

Presbyterian High School
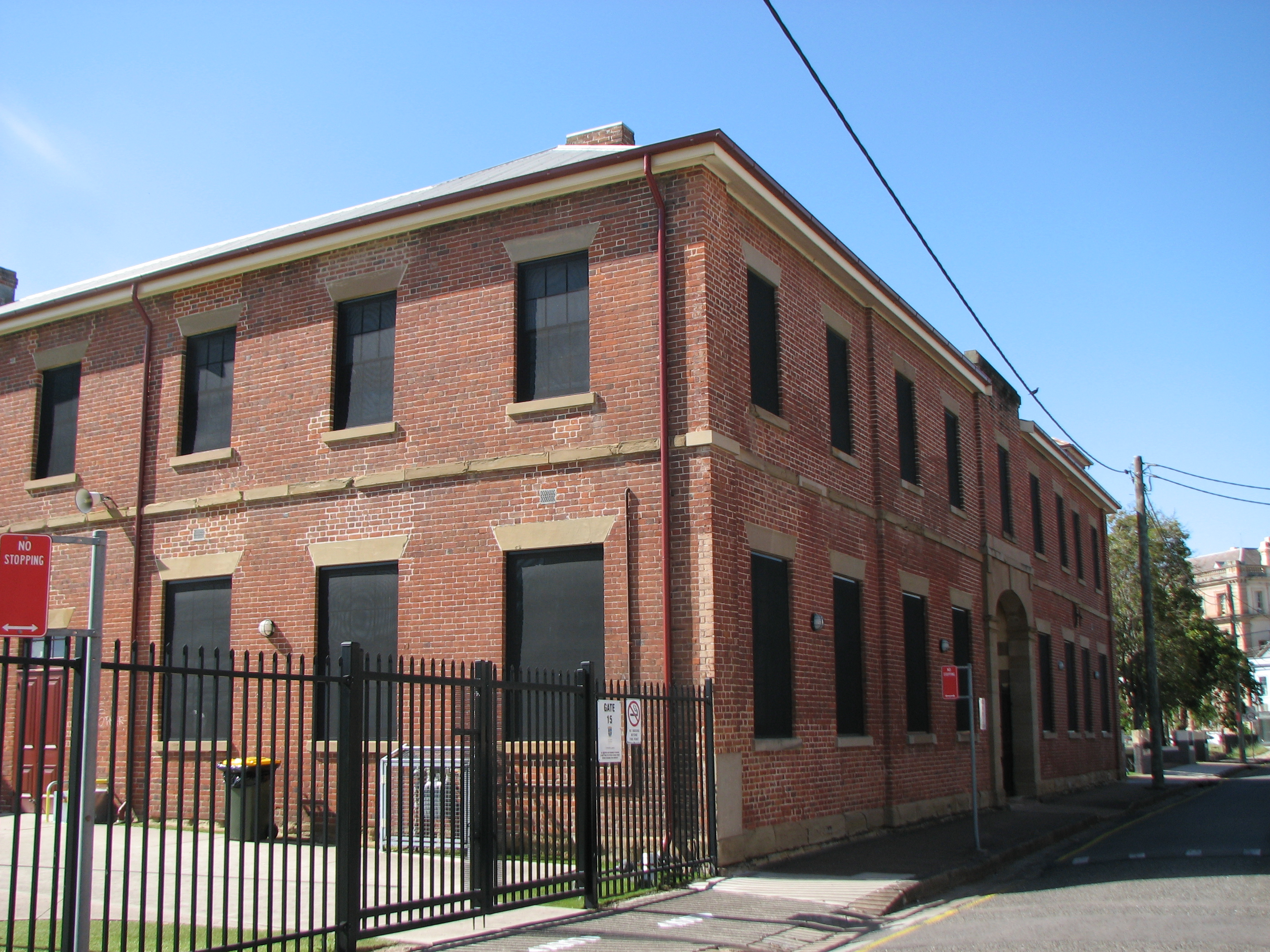
- Presbyterian High School Maitland

- Location within New South Wales Location within Australia
- 32.7349°S 151.5598°E
- Location: 12–14 Free Church Street, Maitland, City of Maitland, New South Wales, Australia

Site notes
- Owner: Roman Catholic Church Trustees

New South Wales Heritage Register
- Official name: Presbyterian High School/Manse (former); Presbyterian High School/Manse
- Type: state heritage (built)
- Designated: 2 April 1999
- Reference no.: 577
- Type: historic site

Presbyterian High School is a heritage-listed former high school and manse at 12–14 Free Church Street, Maitland, City of Maitland, New South Wales, Australia. It is also known as the Presbyterian High School/Manse. The property is owned by Roman Catholic Church Trustees. It was added to the New South Wales State Heritage Register on 2 April 1999.

== History ==
The school was first established by William McIntyre, pastor of the West Maitland Presbyterian Church, at the site of the Presbyterian manse. The foundation stone for the school was laid by McIntyre on 25 September 1855; his brother, Rev. Allan McIntyre, was the first rector or principal. Samuel Griffith, future Premier of Queensland and Chief Justice of the High Court of Australia and Charles Pilcher, later a local MP and King's Counsel, were among the students at the school.

The Presbyterian High School was relatively short-lived before its closure. A Mrs. Johnson operated a private ladies' high school out of the buildings during the 1870s and 1880s before it was acquired as the first premises of the West Maitland State High School for Girls, which opened on 21 January 1884. The new headmistress, Mary Olsen, was critical of the state of the building as "entirely out of repair and unfit for residence" and stating that the sanitary arrangements were "in such a condition that no students should come to school before improvements had been made". The school operated out of the buildings until the 1893 floods; after which Grossmann House was acquired as a new and less flood-prone school site.

By 1929, the premises was again being used as a manse.

It was threatened with demolition in the 1980s, but was prevented because of heritage concerns. A Permanent Conservation Order was granted on 8 May 1989. It is now incorporated into All Saints' College.

== Heritage listing ==
Presbyterian High School was listed on the New South Wales State Heritage Register on 2 April 1999.
