= Penrith Speedway-Aerodrome =

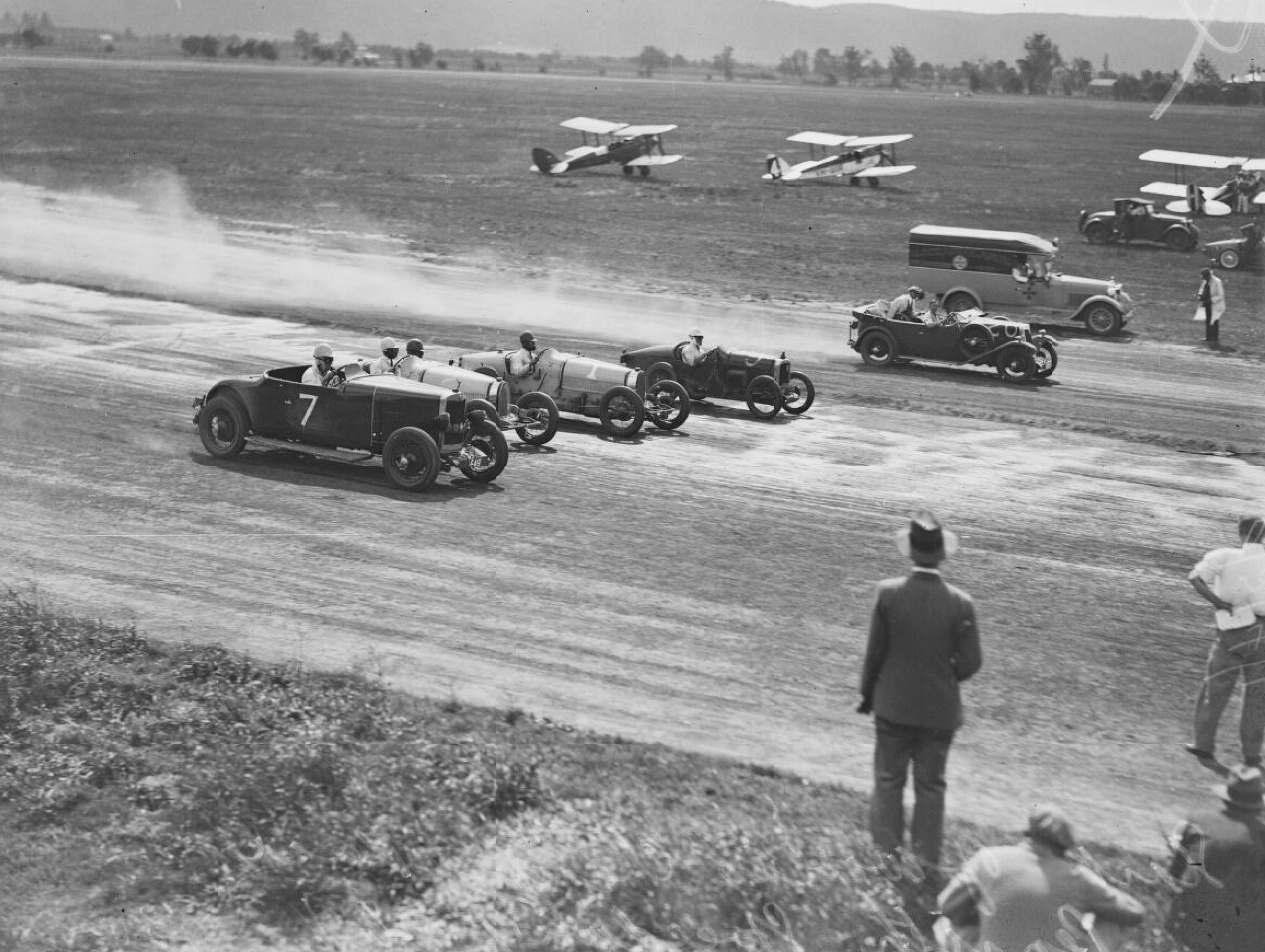
- The starting line for the "World Championship" at the Penrith Speedway, 6 October 1930.
- IATA: none; ICAO: none

Summary
- Airport type: Defunct
- Location: Penrith in Outer Western Sydney, New South Wales
- Opened: January 26, 1928; 98 years ago
- Coordinates: 33°44′49″S 150°41′46″E
- Interactive map of Penrith Speedway-Aerodrome

Penrith Speedway-Aerodrome was a racing and air sports venue located in Belmore Park, Penrith in Outer Western Sydney, New South Wales. Prior to the Penrith Speedway-Aerodrome in the mid-1920s, it served training and experimental flights of the Aerial League of Australia beginning in 1909. As a result, it is considered as the earliest airfield in Australia. At the time, the airfield held air pageants and aerial racing events while the speedway hosted motorcycle and car races.

The racing course was established in 1924, and the aerodrome opened on 26 January 1928 during Anniversary Day. During World War II in 1942, the site was converted into an Army stores depot, and grew to become one of the largest in Australia. It winded down operations in 1994, and was subsequently redeveloped for the Thornton Estate. The speedway and aerodrome's legacy is preserved through a memorial and sculpture near the estate.

== History ==
In 1862, Thomas Smith became the property owner of an undeveloped 1.98 hectare plot in central Penrith. He then constructed a residence in the 1870s, called the Thornton Hall built in the Victorian style. His son, Sydney Smith later inherited the property in 1892. The surrounding area, called Belmore park, was used to host cricket matches between Lord Sheffield’s English Club and the Nepean Districts Cricket Club.

=== Early use ===
In April 1909, George and Florence Taylor founded the Aerial League of Australia, at Hotel Australia located on Castlereagh Street in Sydney. George Taylor further established an aeroplane workshop at Surry Hills in September 1909, constructing military kites while also experimenting with human-carrying gliders and a powered monoplane. Shortly thereafter, the Aerial League of Australia chosen Belmore Park as its primary flying ground. This marked the first instance a piece of land was set aside specifically for aviation purposes. The league issued the first aviation license (No. 1) to William Ewart Hart on 5 December 1911, which was also Australia's first. In November 1911, Hart completed the first manned flight from Belmore Park to Parramatta, using a Bristol bi-plane. At the time, this became the longest flight done in the Southern Hemisphere. Postmaster-general C. E. Frazer subsequently opened Hart's aviation school at Belmore Park on 3 January 1912. In March 1912, Hart relocated his operations to the Ham Common, the site of which later grew into RAAF Base Richmond. The league would also conduct its flights elsewhere, leaving Belmore Park inactive from aviation activities.

=== Penrith speedway ===
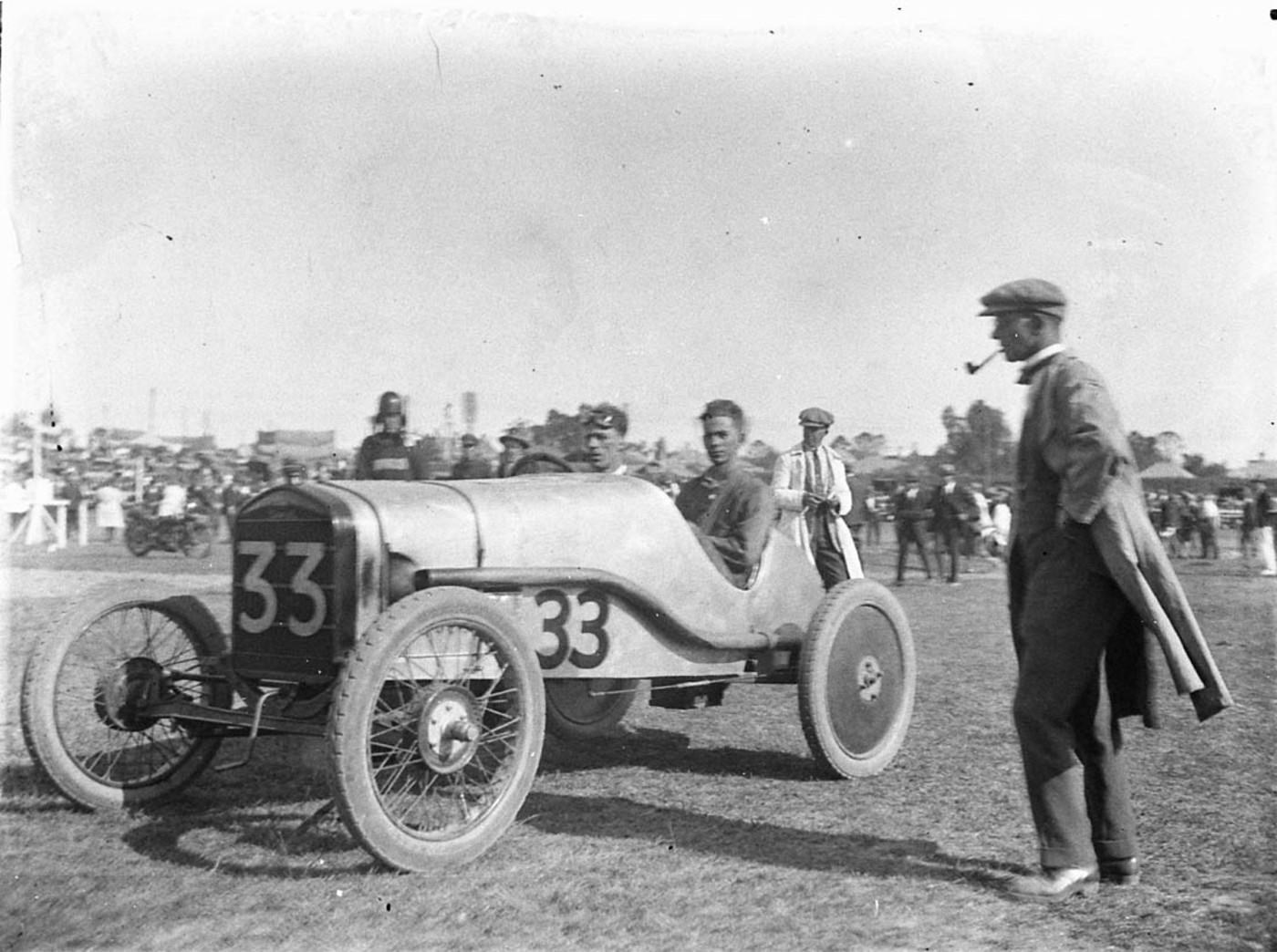
Competitor No 33 : probably Ted King in a modified Ford T racing car, Penrith Speedway, 1925

In the early 1920s, the Western Suburbs Motor Cycle Club approached Mr. Sydney Smith for the loan of a portion of his paddock to hold race meetings. As a result, the club successfully developed a track in 1924, opened over the Easter weekend. Two races were held on the 19th and 21st of April, the first of which attracted over 6,000 people. On 17 May 1924, car racing was introduce on the track, which originally measured 1 mile and 80 yards. The length was reduced down to 1 mile after the second meeting. In April 1925, Penrith Speedway Ltd. was established, leading to the establishment of the Penrith Speedway identity. In the following years, the track experienced many functional improvements. In 1925, sprinklers were installed to control the dust, and it was closed throughout 1926 for reconditioning.

=== Aerodrome ===
The development of an aerodrome at Penrith Speedway was endorsed by local politician Sydney Smith, who shown an interest in aviation at the time. At the time, it was considered by the Sydney Morning Herald as 'one of the finest in Australia'.

On 26 January 1928, during the Anniversary Day (now known as Australia Day), the aerodrome was opened. Upon opening, inaugural flying races and aerial displays were held. Earlier on 21 January, the entries for the race were closed, accumulating with 10 individual entries. Two races were held, and an aerobatics contest by the Australian Flying Corps' Association, overseen by the N.S.W. Aero Club were organised. The course was a triangular aerial circuit, with a stop to report progress at Luddenham Aerodrome and to a point near the Prospect Reservoir, before returning. The participants were: Flight Lieutenant Charles Ulm as first, followed by J. Palmer, N. Stewart, E. H. Chaseling, and Milton Kent. Ulm was the first to finish the course in 20 minutes in his de Havilland Moth, regardless of the handicapped status. The second race, called the Nepean Cup, was held after both club-trained pilots Neil Stewart and E. H. Chaseling gave the exhibition. The participants and results of the race were: F. K. Bardsley as first, followed by Chaseling, Stewart, J. Mitchell, Ulm, and Palmer. The proceeds of the event was devoted to the establishment of bursaries for aviator's children, endowment of a hospital bed, and the remainder to the construction of a hangar. Additionally, a railway siding from the Main Western railway line was located right alongside the location of the hangar.

On 25 September 1928, the Penrith Speedway was recognised by the Civil Aviation Branch under the Department of Defence (also given as the Department of Civil Aviation) as a first-class aerodrome. On 19 February 1929, local cycling official Mr. E Triton was appointed as manager for the speedway and aerodrome. On 22 November 1930, a meeting was held in participation of the Australian Flying Corps Memorial and Provident Fund. It was opened by Ulm, whom achieved local prominence as a pilot. The race saw attendance by Spencer Charles Stratton, a well-known motorcyclist from New Zealand. The Trevethan brothers, who lowered the light car record between Brisbane and Sydney days earlier, also participated in their little Triumph.

== Army usage ==
=== Penrith Engineers' Stores Depot ===
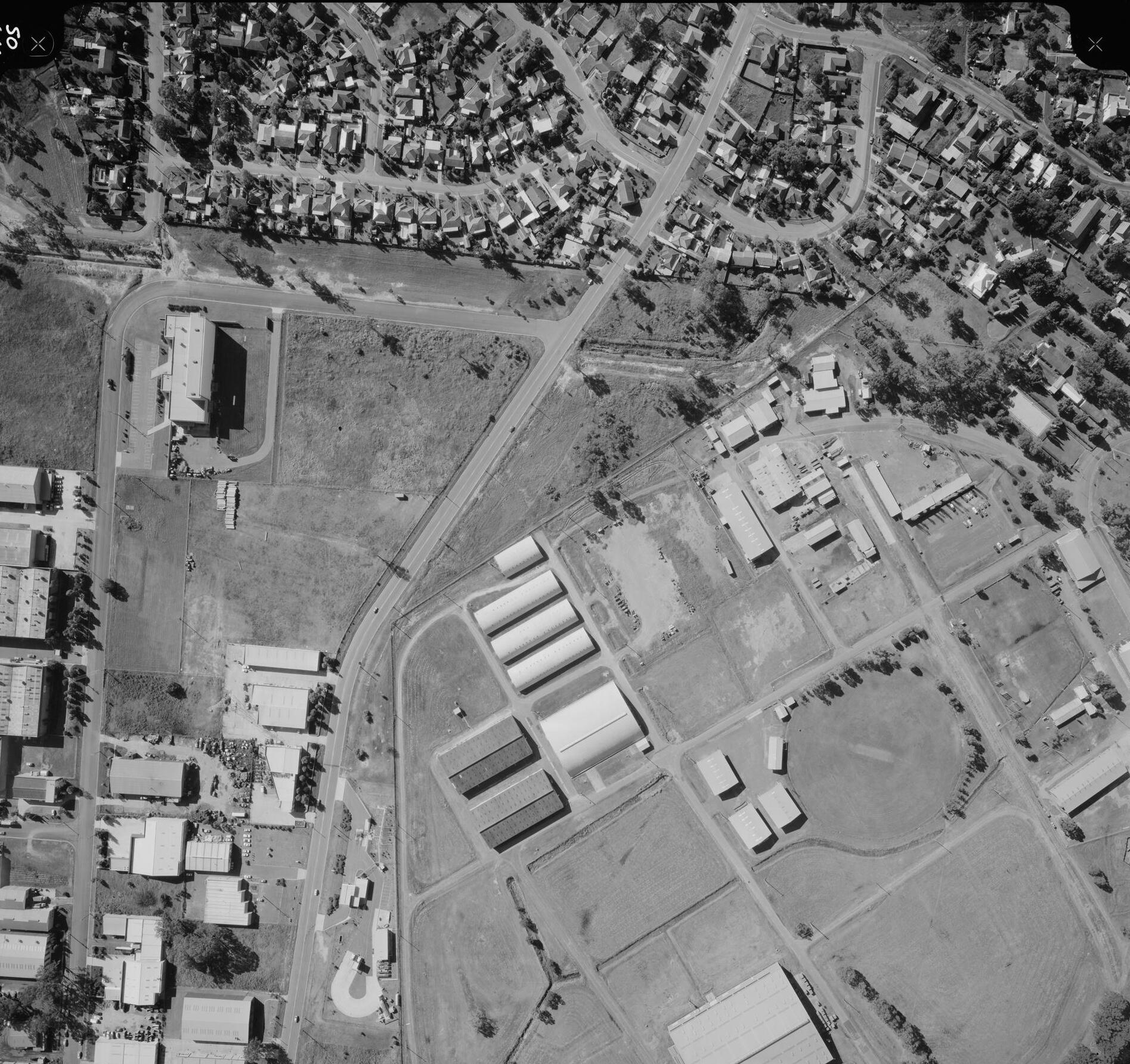
An aerial photograph of the Army Engineering Depot in Penrith, Sydney taken on 24 April 1984.

In 1941, the Royal Australian Engineers began occupying a portion of the site. In 1942, the site officially became the Penrith Engineers' Stores Depot, occupied by the 6th Engineer Stores Regiment. Between 1945 and 1969, the Commonwealth of Australia continued acquiring sections of Belmore Park. By April 1946, the depot held large stocks of unused galvanised barbed wire, galvanised rabbit-proof fencing, steel posts and corrugated fibrous cement. However, these materials were rather left to deteriorate instead of undergoing proper disposal, which became a concern of Australian politician Frank Finnan. At the time, many local businesses had placed urgent orders for these materials despite civil unavailability. On 20 August 1948, a fire was reported at a galvanised iron shed containing pontoon floats. Thirteen volunteer firefighters responded to the blaze at 4 AM, assisted by sixty army personnel. The fire was fought for an hour, and twenty floats were left destroyed.

By the 1950s, the area was remembered as the "old Speedway". In February 1951, the Thornton Hall was acquired and became the residence of the Commanding Officer beginning in 1952. By 1953, the depot held multiple workshops, sections and military supplies. The appurtenances of the base were a Troops' quarters, grocers' shop, Army canteen, sappers' and an engineers' quarters. One warehouse stored materials for installing Bailey bridges—a widely produced portable truss bridge. A shed featured ordinary stores for engineers, including sandbags and pipes, while another held refrigerators for the Army cool rooms. Additional facilities comprising the base were a plumbing shed, spare parts shed, and a transport section featuring four utilities, trucks, and a jeep. Many civilians from the local area worked at the depot, while the Regiment handled most of the operations. On the northern side, the Regiment established an experimental ornamental tree plantation to improve the general appearance of the depot. Since the fire in 1948, a fire squad now existed on the base. In 1953, a thoroughfare was established on the eastern side, named Mountain View Crescent. Afterwards, eight prefabricated houses were built on this site during October 1953. Each house featured three-bedroom units, and provided quarters to house married defence personnel.

By 1960, the Penrith Army Engineers' Stores Depot occupied over 120 acres immediately north of the station, positioned between the town centre and the growing northern suburbs. In July 1960, the Penrith City Council had concerned that the depot prevented the expansion of roads, housing, and commercial development close to the station. Residents had to take long detours to reach the station, and the council even requested for a pedestrian bypass from Lemongrove to the northern side of Penrith railway station (through the depot). However, Minister for the Army John Owen Cramer rejected the request because the depot had become one of the largest in Australia.

"It is a danger target. We could get 10,000 signatures to a petition"

— Councillor W. H. Thomas (28 July 1960)

In 1989, the Defence Housing Authority assumed management and control of Thornton Hall. The 176th Squadron vacated Thornton Hall in mid-1994, and the site remained inactive afterwards.

== Legacy ==
On 9 April 2000, members of the Vintage Motoring and Speedway movement held farewell tour on the old former racecourse perimeter. Attendees walked along the remaining bitumen outline and the first turn of the track. Members even brought vintage automobiles, including an Amilcar (numbered #21) and a green front-wheel drive Alvis, both originally raced the circuit.

In 2014, the Thornton Hall was acquired by heritage building specialist Peter Cipollone. Afterwards, Cipollone led restorative works on the building, involving replicating lost architectural features. By then, its original doors were stolen while several fireplaces were missing. Following restoration, the Thornton Hall became the front administration office for a childcare centre, with its main development taking place behind the building. Studio Gerber designed and installed a commemorative sign summarising Belmore Park's aviation history. Additionally, a nearby public sculpture was made by artists Milne and Stonehouse, featuring a modern interpretation of the Bristol Boxkite.

In 2017, the remaining 3.6 hectare site retained by the Army was declared surplus. Prior, it had been used as a Reserves and Cadets training facility. Overtime, a rise of security incidents including trespass and theft has resulted in costly repairs and replacements. In 2026, the site was divested and sold for development.

Several streets in the new Thornton Estate have been named in relation to Belmore Park's history:

- William Hart Crescent - William Edwart Hart
- Sydney Smith Drive - Sydney Smith
- Daniel Woodriff Drive - Captain Daniel Woodriff
- Thornton Avenue - Thornton Hall
- Cricketers Avenue - Referencing the 1892 cricket matches
- Lord Sheffield Circuit - Lord Sheffield's English club
- Aviators Way - Referencing the local aviation history
