= 1880 New South Wales colonial election =

Colonial election for New South Wales, Australia in 1880

- 17 November 1880 – 2 December 1880

All 108 seats in the New South Wales Legislative Assembly 54 Assembly seats were needed for a majority
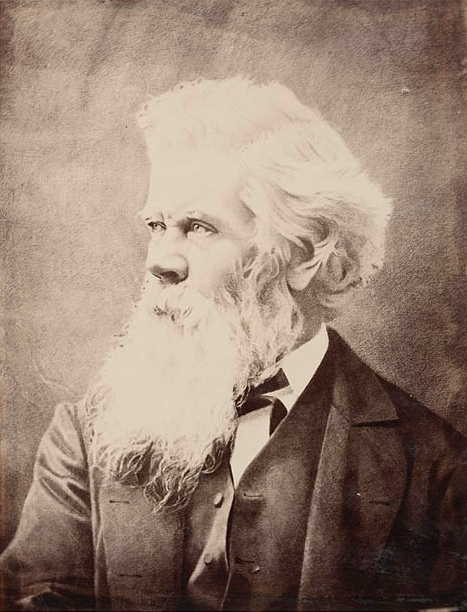

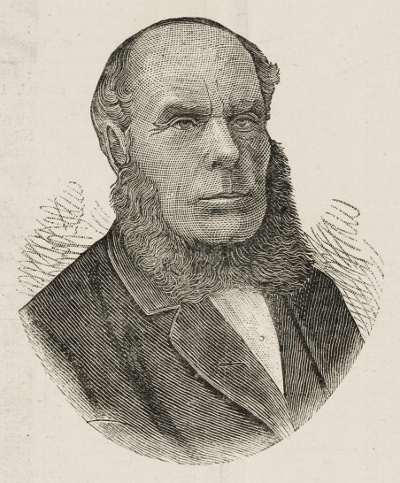
Leader	Sir Henry Parkes	Alexander Stuart
Leader's seat	Canterbury (elected for East Sydney)	elected to Illawarra
Premier before election
Sir Henry Parkes
Elected Premier
Sir Henry Parkes

The 1880 New South Wales colonial election was held between 17 November and 2 December 1880. This election was for all of the 108 seats in the New South Wales Legislative Assembly and it was conducted in 43 single-member constituencies, 25 2-member constituencies, one 3-member constituency and three 4-member constituencies, all with a first past the post system. Suffrage was limited to adult white males. The previous parliament of New South Wales was dissolved on 9 November 1880 by the Governor, Lord Augustus Loftus, on the advice of the Premier, Sir Henry Parkes.

There was no recognisable party structure at this election; instead the government was determined by a loose, shifting factional system.

== Key dates ==
Date	Event
9 November 1880	The Legislative Assembly was dissolved, and writs were issued by the Governor to proceed with an election.
15 to 25 November 1880	Nominations for candidates for the election closed.
17 November to 2 December 1880	Polling days.
15 December 1880	Opening of new Parliament.

== Results ==
New South Wales colonial election, 17 November – 2 December 1880 Legislative Assembly << 1877–1882 >>
Enrolled voters					
Votes cast	178,807		Turnout	61.94	+13.63
Informal votes	2,001		Informal	1.96	+0.95
Summary of votes by party
Party	Primary votes	%	Swing	Seats	Change
Total	178,807			108	

== See also ==
- Members of the New South Wales Legislative Assembly, 1880–1882
- Candidates of the 1880 New South Wales colonial election
