= 1879 Orange colonial by-election =

By-election in New South Wales, Australia

A by-election was held for the New South Wales Legislative Assembly electorate of Orange on 4 March 1879. It was triggered because the Elections and Qualifications Committee held that Edward Combes position of Executive Commissioner for New South Wales at the Paris International Exhibition was an office of profit under the crown and his seat was declared vacant.

== Dates ==
| Date | Event |
|---|---|
| 4 December 1878 | Question referred to the Elections and Qualifications Committee on the basis that Mr Coombes had been paid expenses of £1,250. |
| 11 February 1879 | Report of the Elections and Qualifications Committee was tabled and seat declared vacant. |
| 12 February 1879 | Writ of election issued by the Speaker of the Legislative Assembly. |
| 28 February 1879 | Nominations |
| 4 March 1879 | Polling day |
| 18 March 1879 | Return of writ |

== Results ==
1879 Orange by-election Tuesday 4 March
| Candidate | Votes | % |
|---|---|---|
| Andrew Kerr (elected) | 663 | 57.4 |
| John Ardill | 465 | 40.3 |
| Thomas Dalveen | 27 | 2.3 |
| Total formal votes | 1,155 | 100.0 |
| Informal votes | 0 | 0.0 |
| Turnout | 1,155 | 38.8 |

== See also ==
- Electoral results for the district of Orange
- List of New South Wales state by-elections
