= Thomas Jarman Hawkins =

English-born Australian politician

Thomas Jarman Hawkins (1809 – 12 December 1885) was an English-born Australian politician.

He was born at Walmer in Kent to Thomas Fitzherbert Hawkins and Elizabeth Lilly. The family migrated to Sydney in 1822, and Hawkins became a farmer near Bathurst. Around 1837 he married Ann Bowling, with whom he had four children. He was elected to the New South Wales Legislative Assembly for East Macquarie in 1859, but he resigned in 1860. From 1875 to 1881 he was Commissioner of Crown Lands for the Western District. Hawkins died near Bathurst in 1885.

New South Wales Legislative Assembly
Preceded by William Suttor	Member for East Macquarie; 1859–1860; Served alongside: William Cummings	Succeeded by Daniel Deniehy
