= James Tonkin =

Australian politician (1835–1906)

- Born: 1835; West End of London, England
- Died: 8 May 1906 (aged 71); Glebe, New South Wales, Australia
- Occupation: politician
- Known for: member, New South Wales Legislative Assembly
- Parents: James Tonkin (father); Jemima Stephens (mother)

James Ebenezer Tonkin (1835 – 8 May 1906) was an English-born Australian politician.

He was born in the West End of London to bedstead manufacturer James Tonkin and Jemima Stephens, and migrated to Melbourne in 1854. He was a goldminer at Ballarat, Bendigo, Mount Alexander and Ararat, and from 1856 to 1859 pursued business in Geelong. He followed the gold rush to New Zealand, but returned to Victoria in 1866, moving to New South Wales in 1868. During his time in New Zealand he married Mary Ann Smith, with whom he had twelve children. In 1870 he settled in the Bathurst district, becoming a contractor and hotelier. He was also a City of Bathurst councillor for 5 1/2 years from 1879.

In 1887 he was elected to the New South Wales Legislative Assembly as one of two Free Trade members for East Macquarie. On 21 July 1892 he was made bankrupt on his own petition, and forced to resign. He was re-elected at the resulting by-election. Multi-member districts were abolished in 1894 and Tonkin was the Free Trade candidate for Macquarie which partly replaced East Macquarie, winning the seat in 1894 but was defeated in 1895. He did not hold ministerial or other office.

He died at Glebe in 1906 (aged 71).

New South Wales Legislative Assembly
Preceded by John Shepherd	Member for East Macquarie; 1887–1894; Served alongside: Sydney Smith	District abolished
New district	Member for Macquarie; 1894–1895	Succeeded by William Hurley
