= Patrick Higgins (politician) =

Irish-born Australian politician

Patrick Higgins (1825 – 28 January 1882) was an Irish-born Australian politician.

He was born at Sligo in Connaught to John Higgins and Margaret Lunuy. He emigrated to Victoria in 1852, where he built a goldfields road in 1853. In 1855 he married Rose Lynch, with whom he had a son. From 1857 he worked on railway construction, moving to New South Wales in 1866. He was director of the Sydney Tramway and Omnibus Company. In 1880 he was appointed to the New South Wales Legislative Council, where he remained until his death in 1882.
