= John Bligh Suttor =

Australian politician

John Bligh Suttor (1809 – 27 May 1886) was an Australian politician.

He was born at Baulkham Hills to settler George Suttor and Sarah Dobinson. John Suttor was a pastoralist. On 16 September 1845 he married Julia Bowler, with whom he had ten children.

Suttor was elected to the New South Wales Legislative Assembly for East Macquarie in 1867, a seat previously held by his brother William. John served until his retirement in 1872. In 1882 he was appointed to the New South Wales Legislative Council, where he remained until his death at Wyagdon near Bathurst in 1886.

His nephew William Junior was later elected as the member for East Macquarie before being appointed to the Legislative Council. His grandson John served as an appointed member of the Legislative Council from 1921 until 1934.

New South Wales Legislative Assembly
Preceded by David Buchanan	Member for East Macquarie; 1867–1872; Served alongside: William Cummings	Succeeded by James Martin
