= Jean Serisier =

Jean Emile Serisier (1824 – 10 February 1880) was a French-born Australian storekeeper and vigneron who helped found the city of Dubbo, New South Wales.

== Birth ==
He was born in Bordeaux to shipping broker Emile Alexander Serisier and Rose Marie Mayou.

== Career ==
He came to New South Wales in 1838 as a midshipman; ill health saw him in the care of a merchant called Despointes. In 1847 he tried to set up a store at Dubbo but was refused permission by Robert Dulhunty, who owned the station. He petitioned for a village nearby, and bought several blocks in 1851. He ran a general store for Despointes, and also became local postmaster in 1855. He married Margaret Humphreys on 1 March 1858, with whom he had five children. He was returning officer for the Bogan electorate, and from 1862 was a magistrate. He ran unsuccessfully for the Legislative Assembly in 1872 and 1877. He sold his general store in 1873 (having acquired it from Despointes in the meantime), and subsequently ran a vineyard at his Emulga property. He died while visiting France in 1880.
