= William Henry Suttor =

Australian politician

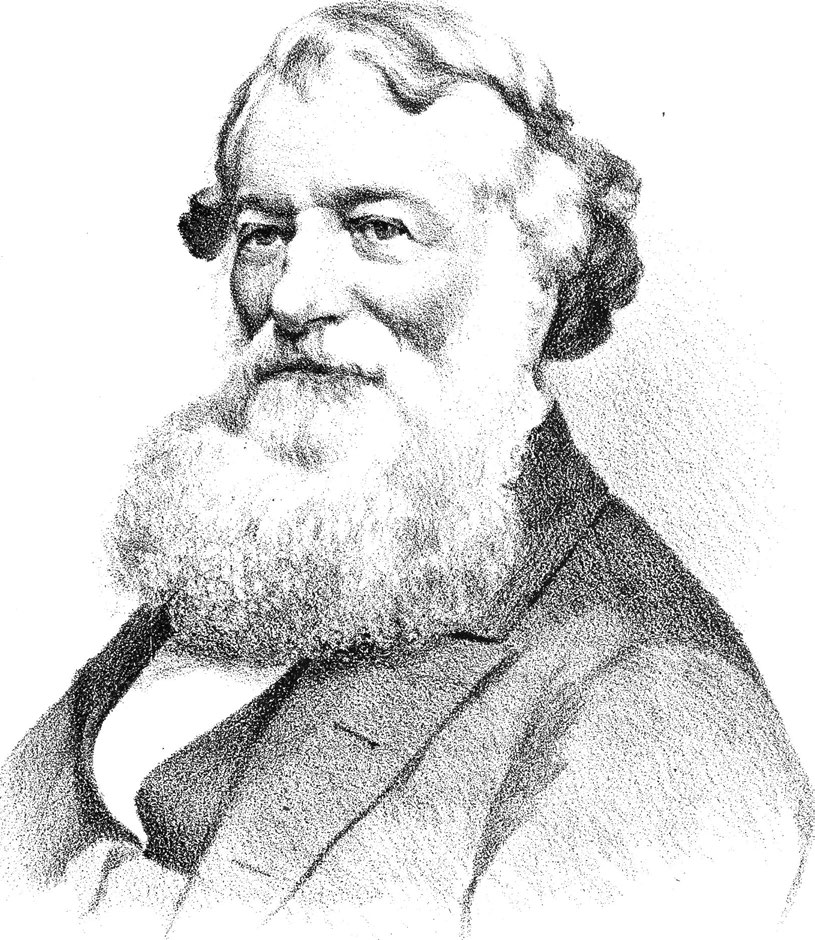

William Henry Suttor (Senior) (12 December 1805 – 20 October 1877) was an Australian pastoralist and politician.

== Early life ==
Suttor was born in Baulkham Hills, New South Wales, the third son of George Suttor and his wife Sarah Maria, née Dobinson. The politician John Bligh Suttor was a brother.

In 1822 his father appointed him overseer of his 130 hectares (320 acres) property 'Brucedale Station' on the Bathurst plains. This turned out to be a successful landholding leading to great prosperity, and was significantly expanded over time.

== Relations with Wiradjuri tribe ==
During a time of great conflict with the Indigenous Australians of the Wiradjuri nation, who resisted the taking of their lands, both William and George established good relations with the aborigines. They were known to have been close to the Wiradjuri's warrior leader Windradyne during the 1820s, and when Windradyne died he was buried at Brucedale.

== Political career ==
From 1843 to 1854 Suttor represented the Counties of Roxburgh, Phillip and Wellington in the New South Wales Legislative Council. Later, Suttor represented the County of Bathurst in the New South Wales Legislative Assembly in 1856–59, East Macquarie in 1859 and 1860–64 and Bathurst in 1866–72.

== Personal life ==
Suttor married Charlotte Francis in 1833, and together they had 14 children: William Henry Suttor (Junior) (1834–1905) who was also a NSW politician, Edwin John Piper, Francis Bathurst, Caroline, George Roxburgh, Edward Leichardt, Charlotte, Herbert Cochrane, Sarah Pauline, Albert Bruce, Walter Sydney, Clara Hay, Horace Melbourne and Norman Lachlan.

== Death ==
William Henry Suttor died in Sydney on 20 October 1877, and is buried at St. Philip's Church in Sydney.

== Legacy ==
The Suttor River in Queensland was named after him. It was named on 7 March 1845 by explorer Ludwig Leichhardt on his expedition from Moreton Bay to Port Essington. Suttor had given Leichhardt some bullocks for his expedition.

Parliament of New South Wales
New South Wales Legislative Council
New parliament	Member for Counties of Roxburgh (Phillip) and Wellington; 1843 – 1854	Succeeded by Saul Samuel
New South Wales Legislative Assembly
Preceded by John Plunkett	Member for Bathurst (County); 1856 – 1859	District abolished
New district	Member for East Macquarie; 1859; With: William Cummings	Succeeded by Thomas Hawkins
Preceded by Daniel Deniehy	Member for East Macquarie; 1860 – 1864; With: William Cummings	Succeeded by David Buchanan
Preceded by James Kemp	Member for Bathurst; 1866 – 1872; With: William Cummings	Succeeded by Edward Combes
