= 1882 Mudgee colonial by-election =

By-election in New South Wales, Australia

A by-election was held for the New South Wales Legislative Assembly electorate of Mudgee on 13 January 1882 because Samuel Terry had been appointed to the Legislative Council to the seat vacated by John Robertson, which would allow Robertson to return to the Assembly as Secretary for Lands.

== Dates ==
Date	Event
29 December 1881	Writ of election issued by the Speaker of the Legislative Assembly and close of electoral rolls.
13 January 1882	Nominations
20 January 1882	Polling day
31 January 1882	Return of writ

== Results ==
1882 Mudgee by-election Friday 13 January
Candidate	Votes	%
John Robertson (elected)	unopposed	

== See also ==
- Electoral results for the district of Mudgee
- List of New South Wales state by-elections
