= 1877 New South Wales colonial election =

Colonial election for New South Wales, Australia in 1877

- 24 October 1877 – 12 November 1877

All 73 seats in the New South Wales Legislative Assembly 37 Assembly seats were needed for a majority
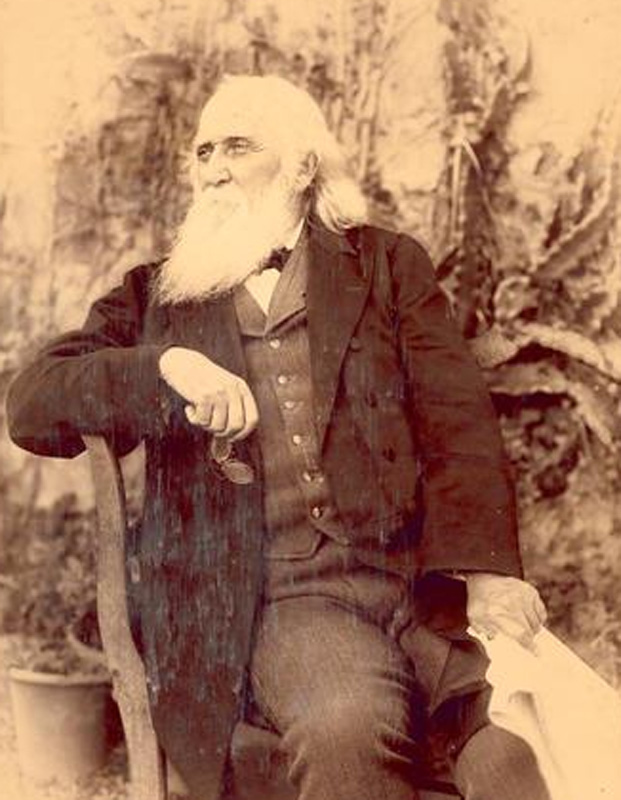

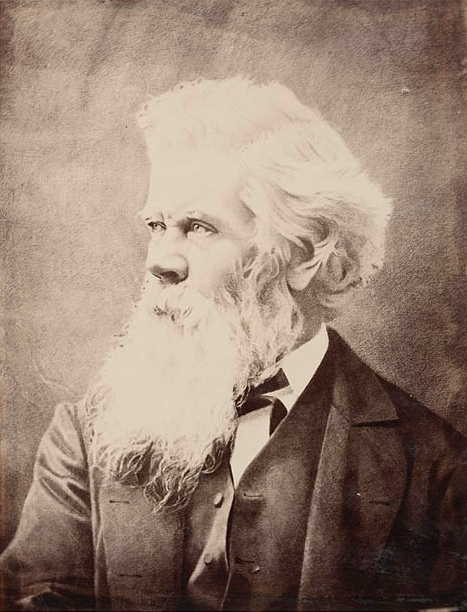
Leader	Sir John Robertson	Sir Henry Parkes
Leader's seat	West Sydney (defeated, elected for East Macquarie and Mudgee)	East Sydney (elected for Canterbury)
Premier before election
Sir John Robertson
Elected Premier
James Farnell

The 1877 New South Wales colonial election was held between 24 October and 12 November 1877. This election was for all of the 73 seats in the New South Wales Legislative Assembly and it was conducted in 53 single-member constituencies, six 2-member constituencies and two 4-member constituencies, all with a first past the post system. Suffrage was limited to adult male British subjects, resident in New South Wales. The previous parliament of New South Wales was dissolved on 12 October 1877 by the Governor, Sir Hercules Robinson, on the advice of the Premier, Sir John Robertson.

There was no recognisable party structure at this election; instead the government was determined by a loose, shifting factional system. Although the leaders of the main groupings at this election were Robertson and Sir Henry Parkes, the subsequent government was formed by James Farnell as a compromise Premier. Farnell's government lasted a year and two days.

== Key dates ==
Date	Event
12 October 1877	The Legislative Assembly was dissolved, and writs were issued by the Governor to proceed with an election.
22 October to 5 November 1877	Nominations for candidates for the election closed.
24 October to 12 November 1877	Polling days.
27 November 1877	Opening of new Parliament.

== Results ==
New South Wales colonial election, 24 October – 12 November 1877 Legislative Assembly << 1874–75–1880 >>
Enrolled voters					
Votes cast	98,503		Turnout	48.31	+1.10
Informal votes	680		Informal	1.01	−0.19
Summary of votes by party
Party	Primary votes	%	Swing	Seats	Change
Total	98,503			73	

== See also ==
- Members of the New South Wales Legislative Assembly, 1877–1880
- Candidates of the 1877 New South Wales colonial election
