= William Cummings (Australian politician) =

Australian politician

William Cummings (1 February 1803 – 22 January 1878) was an Irish-born Australian politician.

He was the son of pastoralist Keenan Cummings and Elizabeth Shelly, and migrated to New South Wales around 1822. He became a pastoralist and squatter, acquiring extensive land in the Wellington and Lachlan districts. On 19 October 1829 he married Mary Ducey; they would have eleven children. In 1859 he was elected to the New South Wales Legislative Assembly for East Macquarie, serving until his defeat in 1874. Cummings died at Peel in 1878.

New South Wales Legislative Assembly
New seat	Member for East Macquarie; 1859–1874; Served alongside: W. H. Suttor/Hawkins/Deniehy/W. H. Suttor/Buchanan/J. B. Suttor/Martin/Cooper	Succeeded by John Booth; William Suttor
