= Walter Cooper (New South Wales politician) =

Australian politician and writer

Walter Hampson Cooper (6 July 1842 – 26 July 1880) was an Australian politician and writer.

He was born at Liverpool to Joshua Cooper and Anne Jane Thompson. He worked as a journalist, first for the Queensland Guardian and then for the Sydney Morning Herald and the Argus. In 1867 he married Ellen Elizabeth Kelly, with whom he had six children. In 1873 he was elected to the New South Wales Legislative Assembly for East Macquarie, but he was defeated in 1874. He was called to the bar in 1875 and continued to work as an electoral organiser for Henry Parkes. Cooper died in 1880.

== Works ==
- The History of Kodadad and His Brothers (1866)
- Harlequin Little Jack Horner (1868)
- Colonial Experience (1868)
- The New Crime (1868)
- Sun and Shadow (1870)
- Foiled (1871)
- Hazard; Or, Pearce Dyceton's Crime (1872)
- Rugantino the Ruthless (1872)

New South Wales Legislative Assembly
Preceded by James Martin	Member for East Macquarie; 1873–1874; Served alongside: William Cummings	Succeeded by John Booth; William Suttor
