= Alfred Pechey =

Australian politician

Alfred John Pechey (1840 – 5 June 1882) was an English-born Australian politician.

He was born at Soham in Cambridgeshire to the Reverend William Pechey, a Baptist minister, and Sarah Rotton. He migrated to Australia around 1865 and worked as a surveyor near Bathurst. On 12 April 1865 he married Anthonina Jane Rotton, the daughter of Henry Rotton.

In 1882 he was elected to the New South Wales Legislative Assembly for East Macquarie at the January by-election, but he died at Bathurst four months later, without taking his seat.

New South Wales Legislative Assembly
Preceded by Edmund Webb	Member for East Macquarie; 1882; Served alongside: Edward Combes	Succeeded by Sydney Smith
