= Charles Pilcher =

Australian politician

- Born: 20 April 1844; West Maitland, New South Wales
- Died: 22 December 1916 (aged 72); Lewisham, New South Wales
- Burial place: Waverley Cemetery
- Occupations: barrister, politician
- Spouse: Maria McPhillamy (m. 1871; died 1903)
- Parents: Henry Incledon Pilcher (father); Eliza Pilcher (née Brockley) (mother)

Charles Edward Pilcher KC (20 April 1844 – 22 December 1916) was an Australian barrister and member of the Parliament of New South Wales.

== Early life ==
He was born at West Maitland, New South Wales, the younger son of Henry Incledon Pilcher, solicitor, and his wife Eliza (née Brockley). He was educated at the Presbyterian High School and the University of Sydney, where he received a Bachelor of Arts in 1865. He was admitted to the bar in 1867.

In 1871, he married Maria McPhillamy (died 1903), with whom he had four children.

== New South Wales parliament ==
He contested the Legislative Assembly seat of West Macquarie at the 1874–75 election, winning with 58.7% of the votes. He held the seat at the 1877 election, and 1880 election, before retiring in 1882.

In 1891, he was appointed to the New South Wales Legislative Council, where he remained until his death at Lewisham on 22 December 1916 (aged 72). He was appointed King's Counsel in 1902.

New South Wales Legislative Assembly
Preceded by Edmund Webb	Member for West Macquarie; 1875–1882	Succeeded by Thomas Hellyer
