= Electoral district of Narellan =

Former state electoral district of New South Wales, Australia

Narellan was an electoral district of the Legislative Assembly in the Australian state of New South Wales between 1859 and 1880, which included the town of Narellan.

== Members for Narellan ==
Member	Party	Period
John Hurley	None	1859–1860
Joseph Leary	None	1860–1864
John Hurley	None	1864–1869
Joseph Leary	None	1869–1872
John Hurley	None	1872–1880

== Election results ==
1877 New South Wales colonial election: Narellan Saturday 27 October
Candidate	Votes	%
John Hurley (re-elected)	244	57.3
John Kidd	182	42.7
Total formal votes	426	100.0
Informal votes	0	0.0
Turnout	426	74.6
