= Joseph Leary =

Australian politician

Joseph Michael Leary (1831–20 October 1881), was an Australian politician and solicitor, serving as a member of the New South Wales Legislative Assembly.

== Early life and education ==
Leary was born in 1831 in Campbelltown, to John Leary and Catherine, née Jones. His father was convicted of theft and transported to Sydney, arriving in 1816 and subsequently worked as a constable and then publican. Both his parents died in November 1846, leaving 5 children orphans when he was 14–15. He was educated at St. Mary's Seminary School, at Sydney College under William Cape, and for two years at the University of Sydney. One brother, George, was secretary to Henry Parkes and William Dalley during their emigration lectures in England and was subsequently clerk of petty sessions in Mudgee.

He married Catherine Keighran on 6 September 1854, and together they had 10 children, 5 daughters and 5 sons.

== Politics ==
In 1860 he contested the seat of Narellan, which covered the Campbelltown area, defeating sitting member John Hurley. He was defeated by Hurley at the 1864 election. He regained the seat at the election in 1869 but was defeated again by Hurley at the 1872 election. Leary unsuccessfully sought to return to parliament standing for The Murrumbidgee at the 1875 election, but won the seat unopposed in the 1876 by-election, holding it in 1877. He was appointed Minister of Justice and Public Instruction in the Farnell ministry in December 1877, and retired with his colleagues on their defeat in December 1878. Leary unsuccessfully contested Camden at the 1880 election.

== Legal career ==
Leary served his articles under the supervision of Richard Driver and in December 1866 he was admitted an attorney and solicitor of the Supreme Court of New South Wales, with his admission being moved by William Dalley. The following month he was appointed one of five commissioners to conduct a Royal Commission to inquire into and report upon the state of lawlessness and crime prevailing in the district of Braidwood. This was in reference to the crimes of the bushrangers the Clarke brothers, and whether police and magistrates had been diligent in seeking to apprehend them. The commission heard evidence from more than 50 witnesses, including Hugh Wallace, a member of the Legislative Council and James Rodd, the member for Goldfields South, which included the Braidwood goldfields. The commissioners reported that Rowland Hassall, one of the magistrates "has refrained from taking any open or active part against the bushrangers or their associates, to preserve himself and his property from outrage and depredation. He has throughout evaded his duty as a Magistrate, by systematically abstaining from adjudicating, or in any way taking part in cases against such offenders or their connections".

The Clarke brothers were arrested in April 1867 and one of Leary's first cases was instructing Dalley in their defence. Both were convicted and sentenced to death. An appeal to the full court of the Supreme Court on a point of law was unsuccessful, and the brothers were executed on 25 June 1867. Leary became a member of the Society for Abolition of Capital Punishment, subsequently serving on its executive.

Rowland Hassall subsequently sued James Rodd for slander in relation to his evidence before the royal commission. The case was prosecuted by the current and 2 former Attorneys General, Sir William Manning QC, John Darvall QC and Sir James Martin QC. Leary instructed Henry Stephen and Edward Butler to successfully defend Rodd in a trial lasting 15 days.

== Death ==
He died in 1881 (aged 49–50) after suffering from Bright's disease.

New South Wales Legislative Assembly
Preceded by John Hurley	Member for Narellan; 1860–1864	Succeeded by John Hurley
Preceded by John Hurley	Member for Narellan; 1869–1872	Succeeded by John Hurley
Preceded by William Forster	Member for The Murrumbidgee; 1876–1880	Succeeded by James Douglas; George Loughnan
Political offices
Preceded by John Lackey	Minister of Justice and Public Instruction; 1877 – 1878	Succeeded by Francis Suttor
