= Sydney Smith (Australian politician) =

Australian politician (1856–1934)

The Honourable Sydney Smith
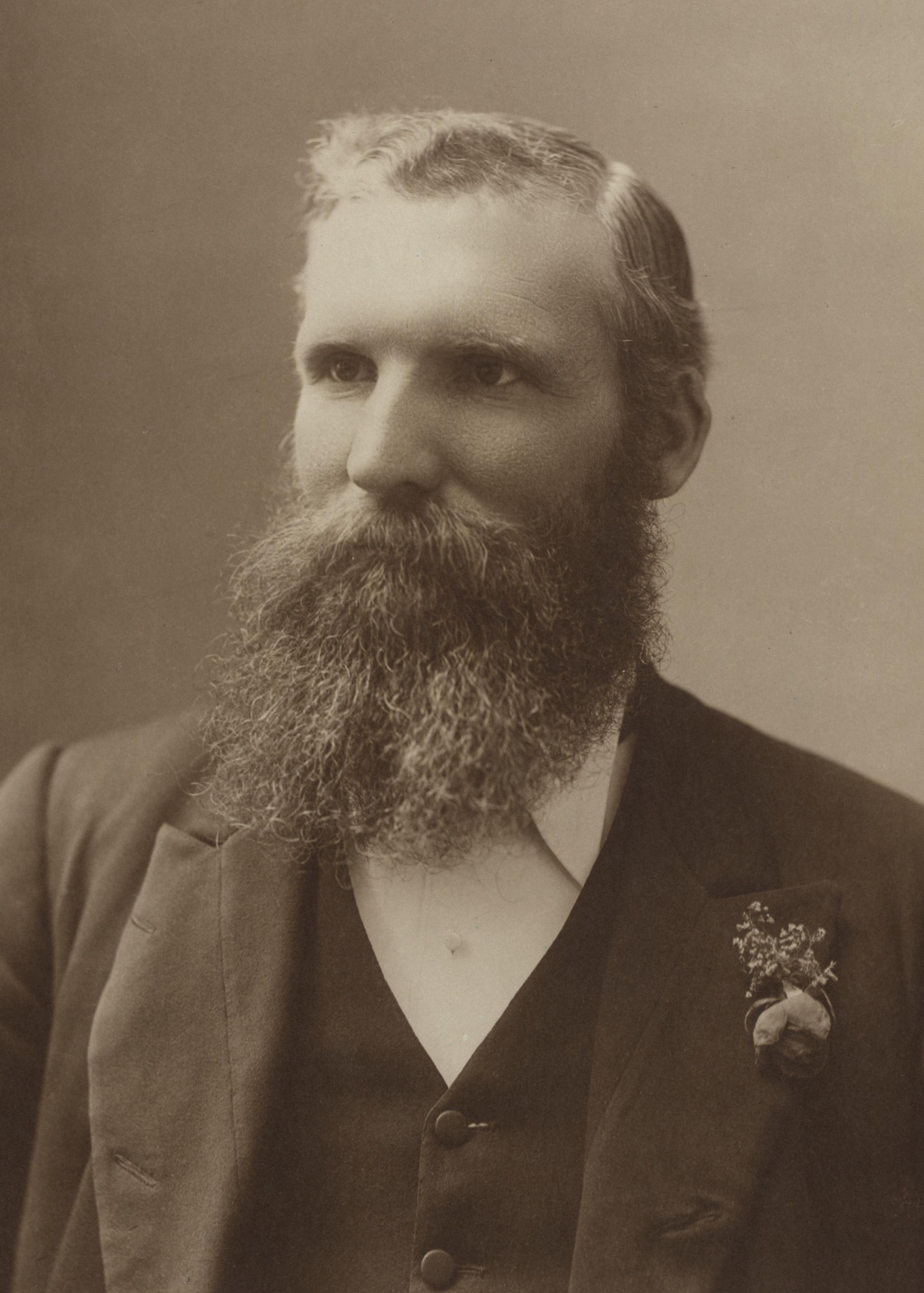

Postmaster-General of Australia
- In office 17 August 1904 – 5 July 1905
- Prime Minister: George Reid
- Preceded by: Hugh Mahon
- Succeeded by: Austin Chapman

Member of the Australian Parliament for Macquarie
- In office 29 March 1901 – 12 December 1906
- Preceded by: New seat
- Succeeded by: Ernest Carr

Personal details
- Born: 11 April 1856 Colyton, New South Wales, Australia
- Died: 21 February 1934 (aged 77) Croydon, New South Wales, Australia
- Party: Free Trade Party
- Spouse(s): Sarah Hockey (m. 1879; died 1907) Annie Shand (m. 1930)
- Occupation: Public servant Businessman

Sydney Smith (11 April 1856 – 21 February 1934) was an Australian politician. He began his parliamentary career in the New South Wales Legislative Assembly (1882–1898, 1900) and served as a government minister under Henry Parkes. He transferred to the new House of Representatives after Federation, representing the Division of Macquarie from 1901 to 1906. He served as Postmaster-General in the Reid government from 1904 to 1905.

== Early years ==
Smith was born on 11 April 1856 in Colyton, New South Wales. He was the seventh child born to Jane (née Laimbeer) and Thomas Smith; his father was a publican and orchardist.

Smith was educated in Sydney and joined the railways section of the colonial Department of Public Works in 1870. He was stationed at Penrith and initially worked as a porter, later training in telegraphy. He was appointed as a stationmaster in 1877 and was later promoted to chief clerk and assistant traffic manager.

In 1880, Smith resigned from the public service and went into business as an auctioneer and land agent with his older brother Thomas Richard Smith, who had been elected to the New South Wales Legislative Assembly a few years earlier. He established his own firm, Sydney Smith & Co., in 1888 and also acquired interests in grazing properties.

== State politics ==
Smith was first elected to the New South Wales Legislative Assembly in 1882, representing East Macquarie until its abolition in 1894 and then ran for nearby Bathurst. Described as "tall, spare and bearded" but "not renowned for his oratory skills", the non-smoking teetotaller was made Secretary for Mines by Henry Parkes in 1889 and the inaugural Secretary for Agriculture in 1890, in which position he founded Hawkesbury Agricultural College. He also found the time to serve as Mayor of Leichhardt Municipal Council from 1888–89.

Smith lost his seat by 103 votes at the 1898 New South Wales election when he ran on what many considered to be an anti-federalist stance and ran unsuccessfully against Edmund Barton for Hastings and Macleay in the by-election later that same year, before returning to the New South Wales Legislative Assembly in a by-election for Canterbury on 9 June 1900. However, his victory (by five votes) was declared void, and Smith was defeated at the subsequently reheld by-election on 28 July 1900.

== Federal politics ==
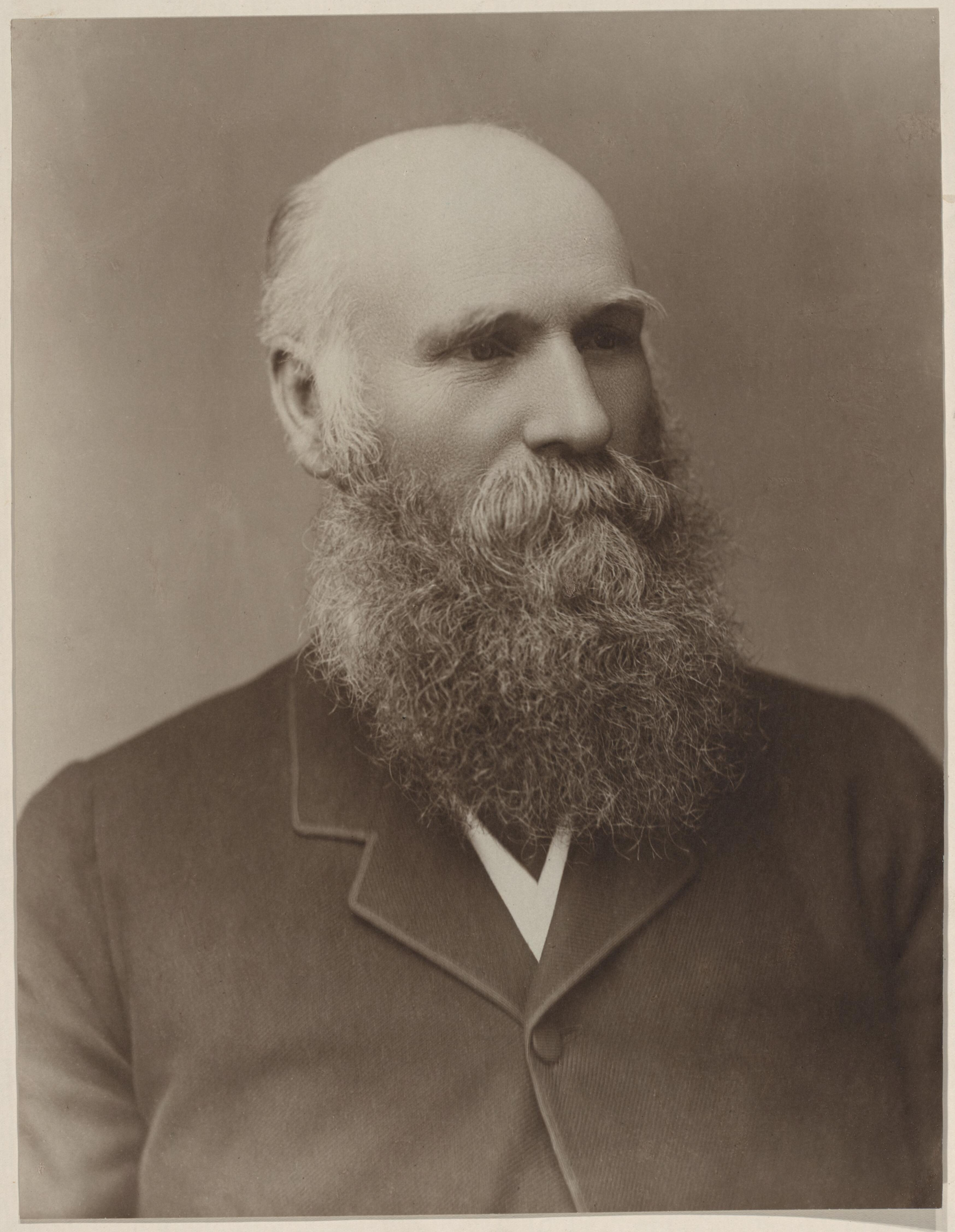
Undated photo

While not a parliamentarian, Smith served on the executive of the Free Trade Party and began planning his campaign for a seat in the new federal parliament. He decided to contest Macquarie at the first federal election in 1901 but was given little chance of victory by observers and the local press, who pointed to his earlier anti-federal views and his recent electoral losses as proof that he exercised little influence amongst the electorate. Smith, however, gained the endorsement of the local branch of the influential Loyal Orange Lodge and the support of Free Trade Party leader George Reid—who enjoyed a large personal support amongst voters—and was elected. In 1903, he again won Macquarie, defeating William Sandford.

Smith served as a senior member of the Free Trade Party in opposition before helping to engineer the downfall of the Chris Watson government and its replacement by George Reid as Prime Minister. Widely considered Reid's most faithful henchman during his time in parliament, Smith was made Postmaster-General by Reid but retired from political life following his defeat at the 1906 elections.

== Personal life ==
In 1879, Smith married Sarah Jane Hockey, with whom he had six children. His youngest son was killed at the Gallipoli landings, while his eldest son, also named Sydney, served as president of the New South Wales Cricket Association. He was widowed in 1907 and remarried in 1930 to Annie Shand, a nurse.

After his parliamentary defeat Smith retired to Thornton Hall, his father's estate at Penrith. After World War I he became the president of the Sailors' and Soldiers' Fathers' Association. In the early 1920s he allowed the Penrith Speedway to be constructed on his land, which was used for motor racing and motorcycle racing. It later evolved into the Penrith Speedway-Aerodrome, flown by locally famous aviators William Ewart Hart and Charles Ulm. He died at Croydon on 21 February 1934, aged 77.

Parliament of New South Wales
Political offices
Preceded by John Chanter as Secretary for Mines	Secretary for Mines then Secretary for Mines and Agriculture; 1889 – 1891	Succeeded by Thomas Slattery
Preceded by Thomas Slattery	Secretary for Mines and Agriculture; 1894 – 1898	Succeeded by Joseph Cook
New South Wales Legislative Assembly
Preceded by Alfred Pechey	Member for East Macquarie; 1882 – 1894; With: Combes / Shepherd / Tonkin	Succeeded by District abolished
Preceded by Francis Suttor	Member for Bathurst; 1894 – 1898	Succeeded by Francis Suttor
Preceded by Varney Parkes	Member for Canterbury; 1900	Succeeded by Thomas Taylor
Parliament of Australia
New division	Member for Macquarie; 1901 – 1906	Succeeded by Ernest Carr
Political offices
Preceded by Hugh Mahon	Postmaster-General; 1904 – 1905	Succeeded by Austin Chapman
Civic offices
Preceded by Benjamin Robert Moore	Mayor of Leichhardt; 1888 – 1889	Succeeded by Benjamin Robert Moore
