= Edmund Webb (Australian politician) =

Australian politician

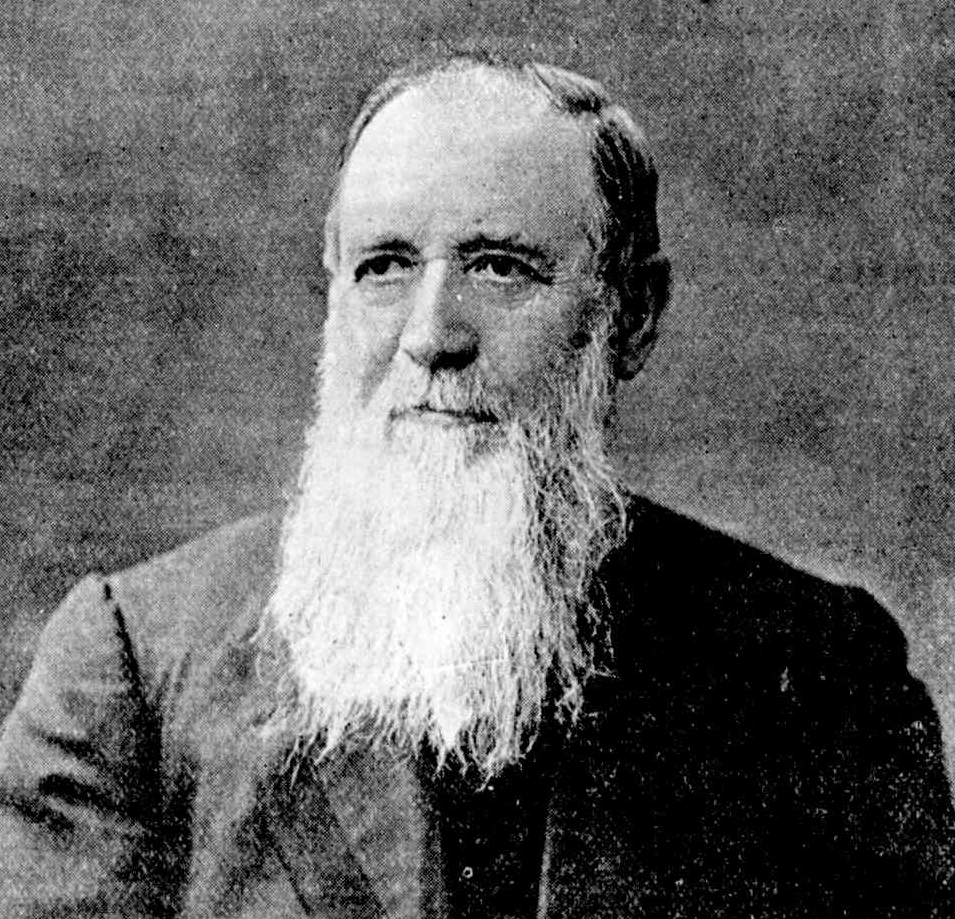

Edmund Webb (4 September 1830 – 24 June 1899) was a Cornish-born Australian politician.

He was born at Liskeard in Cornwall to farmer Thomas Webb and Catherine Geake. He arrived in Sydney with his family on 13 September 1847 and worked as a draper at Bathurst, opening his own business in 1851. On 18 January 1854 he married Selina Jane Jones; they had five children. His drapery was successful and he soon supplied much of western New South Wales. In 1863 he was elected to Bathurst Council; he served as mayor in 1866 and 1868, and from 1875 to 1877.

In 1869 he was elected to the New South Wales Legislative Assembly for West Macquarie, serving until his defeat in 1874. He was returned for East Macquarie in 1878, serving until his resignation in 1881.

In 1882 he was appointed to the New South Wales Legislative Council, where he remained until his death at Parkes in 1899. Webb was a generous benefactor, founder and councillor, from 1879 to 1897, of Newington College and its senior boarding facility, Edmund Webb House, is named in his Honour.

New South Wales Legislative Assembly
| Preceded by Richard Driver | Member for West Macquarie; 1869–1874 | Succeeded by Charles Pilcher |
| Preceded by John Robertson | Member for East Macquarie; 1878–1881; Served alongside: William Suttor, Jr./Edward Combes | Succeeded by Alfred Pechey |
Civic offices
| Preceded by Charles Croaker | Mayor of Bathurst; 1866 | Succeeded by Edward Gell |
| Preceded by James Rutherford | Mayor of Bathurst; Sep 1868 – Feb 1869 | Succeeded by John de Clouett |
| Preceded by Francis Halliday | Mayor of Bathurst; 1875 – 1877 | Succeeded by Francis Halliday |
