= John Hurley (New South Wales politician, born 1796) =

Australian politician

John Hurley (1796 – 27 November 1882) was a politician in colonial New South Wales, member of the New South Wales Legislative Assembly.

Hurley was born in Limerick, Ireland. He was a member for Narellan 27 June 1859 to 10 November 1860, 17 December 1864 to 15 November 1869 and 4 March 1872 to 9 November 1880. He did not hold caucus, parliamentary or ministerial office.

New South Wales Legislative Assembly
| New district | Member for Narellan; 1859-1860 | Succeeded by Joseph Leary |
| Preceded by Joseph Leary | Member for Narellan; 1864-1869 | Succeeded by Joseph Leary |
| Preceded by Joseph Leary | Member for Narellan; 1872-1880 | district abolished |
