= William Suttor Jr =

Australian politician

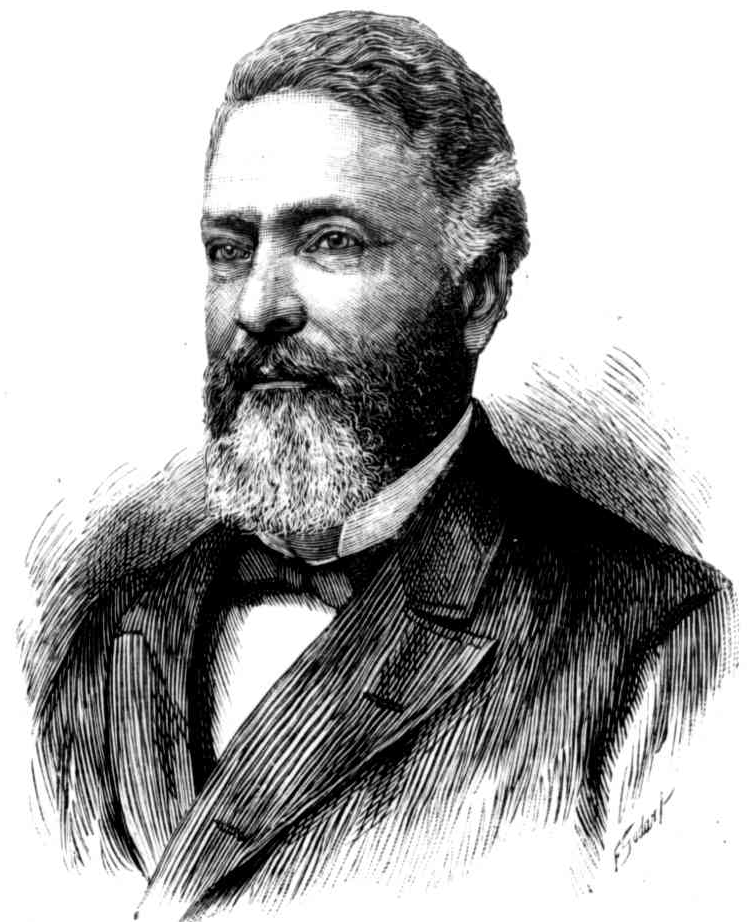

William Henry Suttor (4 November 1834 – 20 October 1905) was an Australian politician, pastoralist, and writer.

He was born at Brucedale near Bathurst to William Henry Suttor and Charlotte Augusta Ann Francis. He was educated at Parramatta and then worked on the family property, becoming his father's partner by 1865. In 1862 he married Adelaide Agnes Henrietta Bowler, with whom he had seven children.

His father had been a member of the New South Wales Legislative Council and the Legislative Assembly, and in 1875 William Junior followed him into parliament, being elected to the Legislative Assembly for East Macquarie, a seat previously held by both his father, and his uncle John. He served until his resignation in 1879, including a period as Secretary for Mines from 1877 to 1878. In 1880 he was appointed to the Legislative Council, where he remained until 1900, serving twice (1889–1891, 1894–1895) as Vice-President of the Executive Council and Representative of the Government in the Legislative Council.

Suttor died in Sydney on 20 October 1905 (aged 70).

Parliament of New South Wales
Political offices
| Preceded by Archibald Jacob | Secretary for Mines; 1877 – 1878 | Succeeded by Ezekiel Baker |
| Preceded by Sir John Lackey | Vice-President of the Executive Council; 1899 – 1891 | Succeeded by Sir Julian Salomons |
| Preceded by Edmund Barton | Representative of the Government in the Legislative Council; 1899 – 1891 | Succeeded by Sir Julian Salomons |
| Preceded by Sir John Lackey | Vice-President of the Executive Council; Representative of the Government in the Legislative Council; 1899 – 1891 | Succeeded by Sir Julian Salomons |
New South Wales Legislative Assembly
| Preceded by Walter Cooper; William Cummings | Member for East Macquarie; 1875–1879; Served alongside: John Booth/John Robertson/Edmund Webb | Succeeded by Edward Combes |
