= Edward Combes =

Australian politician (1830 - 1895)

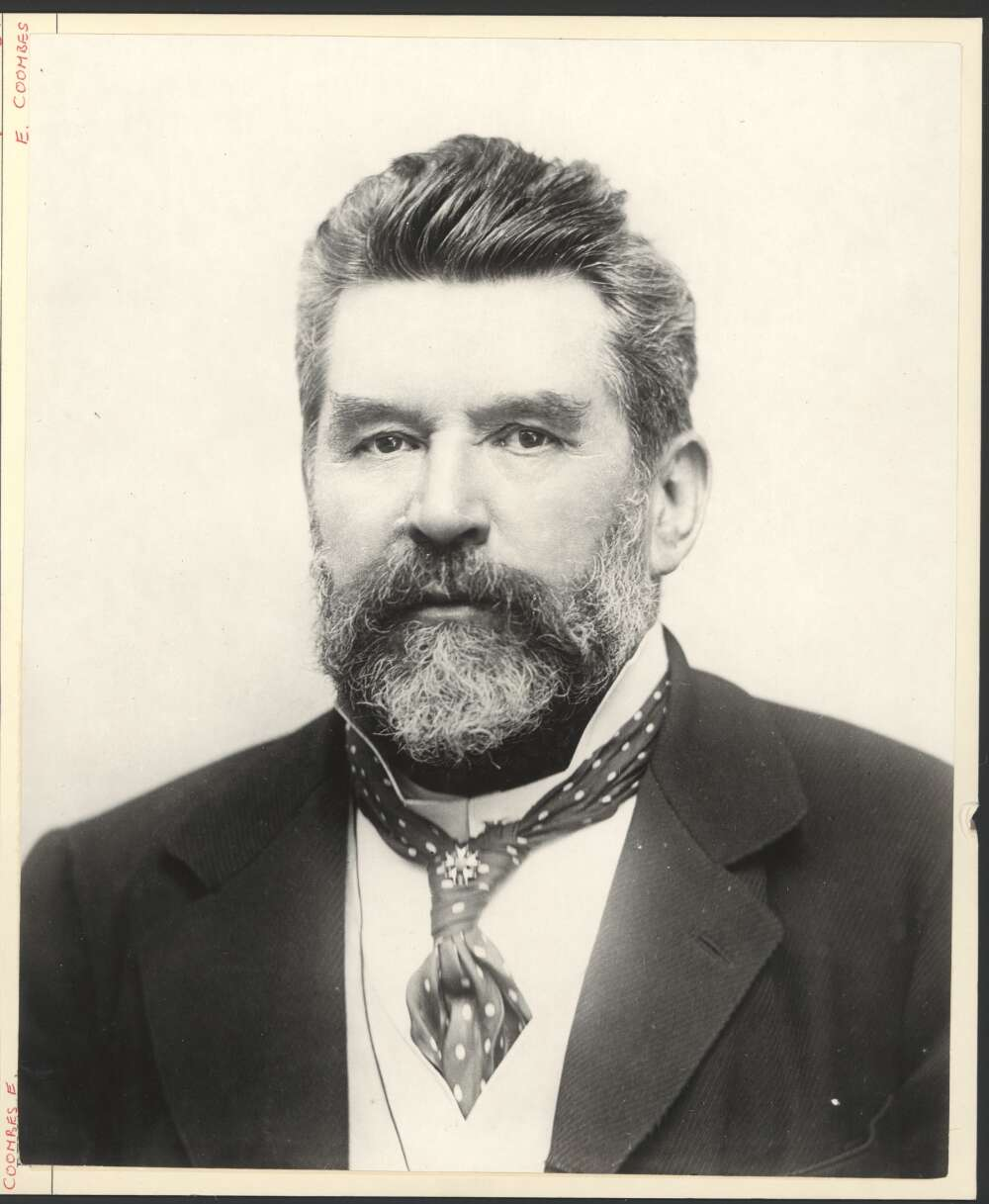
Mr Edward Combes, c. 1880

Edward Combes CMG (6 September 1830 – 18 October 1895) was an engineer, pastoralist, politician and painter. He was a member of the New South Wales Legislative Assembly, and later the New South Wales Legislative Council.

Combes entered the Government service of New South Wales in 1858. Four years later he was appointed Government Mining Engineer, and was returned to the Assembly as the member for Bathurst in 1872 and for Orange in 1875. Combes was Secretary for Public Works in the fourth Robertson ministry from August to December 1877, and in the following year was appointed Executive Commissioner for New South Wales at the Paris International Exhibition, his seat in Parliament being declared vacant because that was held to be an office of profit under the Crown. He was re-elected to parliament as the member for East Macquarie in August 1879, holding the seat until 1885. In 1891 he was appointed to the Legislative Council, which he held until his death in 1895.

He was made a Companion of the Order of St Michael and St George (CMG) for his services at Paris, and an officer of the Legion of Honour. Combes, who married a daughter of the late William C. Hare, was a member of the Institution of French Civil Engineers, and an associate of the Institution of Civil Engineers of London. He was also an artist of considerable merit, and had exhibited with success at some of the leading London galleries.

Combes died in Bathurst on 18 October 1895 (aged 65).

Parliament of New South Wales
Political offices
Preceded by James Hoskins	Secretary for Public Works; August – December 1877	Succeeded by John Sutherland
New South Wales Legislative Assembly
Preceded by William Suttor, Sr.	Member for Bathurst; 1872 – 1874	Succeeded by Francis Suttor
Preceded by Harris Nelson	Member for Orange; 1877 – 1879	Succeeded by Andrew Kerr
Preceded by William Suttor, Jr.	Member for East Macquarie; 1879 – 1885; Served alongside: Pechey/Smith	Succeeded by John Shepherd
