= Electoral district of East Macquarie =

Former state electoral district of New South Wales, Australia

East Macquarie was an electoral district of the Legislative Assembly in the Australian state of New South Wales between 1859 and 1894, in the Bathurst region. It was represented by two members, with voters casting two votes and the first two candidates being elected.

== Members for East Macquarie ==
Member	Party	Term	Member	Party	Term
William Suttor, Sr.	None	1859–1859	William Cummings	None	1859–1874
Thomas Hawkins	None	1859–1860	William Cummings	None	1859–1874
Daniel Deniehy	None	1860–1860	William Cummings	None	1859–1874
William Suttor, Sr.	None	1860–1864	William Cummings	None	1859–1874
David Buchanan	None	1864–1867	William Cummings	None	1859–1874
John Suttor	None	1867–1872	William Cummings	None	1859–1874
James Martin	None	1872–1873	William Cummings	None	1859–1874
Walter Cooper	None	1873–1874	William Cummings	None	1859–1874
John Booth	None	1875–1877	William Suttor, Jr.	None	1875–1879
John Robertson	None	1877–1878	William Suttor, Jr.	None	1875–1879
Edmund Webb	None	1878–1881	William Suttor, Jr.	None	1875–1879
Edmund Webb	None	1878–1881	Edward Combes	None	1879–1885
Alfred Pechey	None	1882–1882	Edward Combes	None	1879–1885
Sydney Smith	None	1882–1894	Edward Combes	None	1879–1885
Sydney Smith	None	1882–1894	John Shepherd	None	1885–1887
Sydney Smith	Free Trade	1887–1894	James Tonkin	Free Trade	1887–1894

== Election results ==
1891 New South Wales colonial election: East Macquarie Friday 19 June
Party	Candidate	Votes	%	±%
Free Trade	Sydney Smith (re-elected 1)	961	37.8	
Free Trade	James Tonkin (re-elected 2)	893	35.1	
Protectionist	Alfred Hales	688	27.1	
Total formal votes		2,542	99.5	
Informal votes		12	0.5	
Turnout		1,621	62.4	
Free Trade hold 2				
