= Electoral results for the district of Carcoar =

Election results for Carcoar, New South Wales, Australia

Carcoar, an electoral district of the Legislative Assembly in the Australian state of New South Wales was created in 1859 and abolished in 1894.

Election	Member	Party		
1859	William Watt	None		
1860	William Watt	None		
1862 by	William Dalley	None		
1864	Barnard Stimpson	None		
1869	Richard Driver	None		
1872	Thomas West	None		
1874	Solomon Meyer	None		
1876 by	Andrew Lynch	None		
1877	Andrew Lynch	None	Member	Party
1880	Ezekiel Baker	None	Andrew Lynch	None
1881 by	George Campbell	None	Andrew Lynch	None
1882	George Campbell	None	Andrew Lynch	None
1884 by	George Campbell	None	Ezekiel Baker	None
1885	Charles Garland	None	Ezekiel Baker	None
1887	Charles Garland	Free Trade	Charles Jeanneret	Free Trade
1889	Charles Garland	Free Trade	John Plumb	Free Trade
1891	Denis Donnelly	Protectionist	Charles Jeanneret	Free Trade

== Election results ==
=== Elections in the 1890s ===
==== 1891 ====
1891 New South Wales colonial election: Carcoar Friday 19 June
Party	Candidate	Votes	%	±%
Protectionist	Denis Donnelly (elected 1)	1,124	25.9	
Free Trade	Charles Jeanneret (elected 2)	1,110	25.6	
Free Trade	John Plumb (defeated)	1,103	25.4	
Protectionist	Alfred Fremlin	921	21.2	
Protectionist	Ezekiel Baker	81	1.9	
Total formal votes		4,339	98.8	
Informal votes		51	1.2	
Turnout		2,327	63.2	
Protectionist gain 1 from Free Trade				
Free Trade hold 1				

=== Elections in the 1880s ===
==== 1889 ====
1889 New South Wales colonial election: Carcoar Saturday 9 February
Party	Candidate	Votes	%	±%
Free Trade	Charles Garland (elected 1)	1,174	27.7	
Free Trade	John Plumb (elected 2)	1,146	27.0	
Protectionist	Denis Donnelly	972	22.9	
Protectionist	Alfred Fremlin	953	22.5	
Total formal votes		4,245	99.5	
Informal votes		23	0.5	
Turnout		2,294	61.5	
Free Trade hold 2				

==== 1887 ====
1887 New South Wales colonial election: Carcoar Saturday 12 February
Party	Candidate	Votes	%	±%
Free Trade	Charles Garland (re-elected 1)	1,160	38.7	
Free Trade	Charles Jeanneret (elected 2)	1,014	33.8	
Protectionist	Francis Freehill	824	27.5	
Total formal votes		2,998	100.0	
Informal votes		0	0.0	
Turnout		1,940	55.2	

==== 1885 ====
1885 New South Wales colonial election: Carcoar Friday 23 October
Candidate	Votes	%
Charles Garland (elected 1)	1,034	39.5
Ezekiel Baker (re-elected 2)	932	35.6
Francis Freehill	655	25.0
Total formal votes	2,621	99.4
Informal votes	17	0.6
Turnout	1,725	55.7

==== 1884 by-election ====
1884 Carcoar by-election Friday 21 November
Candidate	Votes	%
Ezekiel Baker (elected)	715	45.9
Thomas Fitzpatrick	426	27.3
Charles Garland	417	26.7
Total formal votes	1,558	100.0
Informal votes	0	0.0
Turnout	1,558	50.2

Andrew Lynch died.

==== 1882 ====
1882 New South Wales colonial election: Carcoar Wednesday 6 December
Candidate	Votes	%
George Campbell (re-elected 1)	1,074	40.7
Andrew Lynch (re-elected 2)	833	31.6
Thomas Fitzpatrick	732	27.7
Total formal votes	2,639	99.3
Informal votes	19	0.7
Turnout	1,566	54.8

==== 1881 by-election ====
1881 Carcoar by-election Thursday 1 December
Candidate	Votes	%
George Campbell (elected)	846	58.1
Ezekiel Baker (defeated)	610	41.9
Total formal votes	1,456	96.4
Informal votes	55	3.6
Turnout	1,511	56.2

The sitting member Ezekiel Baker was expelled from the Assembly on allegations of bribery and corruption.

==== 1880 ====
1880 New South Wales colonial election: Carcoar Monday 22 November
Candidate	Votes	%
Ezekiel Baker (re-elected 1)	1,320	43.6
Andrew Lynch (re-elected 2)	883	29.2
William Suttor	825	27.3
Total formal votes	3,028	99.1
Informal votes	29	1.0
Turnout	1,724	64.6
	(1 new seat)	

Ezekiel Baker was the sitting member for the abolished district of Goldfields South.

=== Elections in the 1870s ===
==== 1877 ====
1877 New South Wales colonial election: Carcoar Tuesday 30 October
Candidate	Votes	%
Andrew Lynch (re-elected)	unopposed	

==== 1876 by-election ====
1876 Carcoar by-election Wednesday 14 June
Candidate	Votes	%
Andrew Lynch (elected)	unopposed	

Solomon Meyer resigned.

==== 1874-75 ====
1874–75 New South Wales colonial election: Carcoar Monday 28 December 1874
Candidate	Votes	%
Solomon Meyer (elected)	523	50.4
T R Icely	514	49.6
Total formal votes	1,037	97.5
Informal votes	27	2.5
Turnout	1,064	52.0

==== 1872 ====
1872 New South Wales colonial election: Carcoar Monday 26 February
Candidate	Votes	%
Thomas West (elected)	unopposed	

=== Elections in the 1860s ===
==== 1869-70 ====
1869–70 New South Wales colonial election: Carcoar Thursday 23 December 1869
Candidate	Votes	%
Richard Driver (elected)	unopposed	

==== 1864-65 ====
1864–65 New South Wales colonial election: Carcoar Wednesday 21 December 1864
Candidate	Votes	%
Barnard Stimpson (elected)	unopposed	

==== 1862 by-election ====
1862 Carcoar by-election Thursday 16 October
Candidate	Votes	%
William Dalley (elected)	unopposed	

William Watt resigned.

==== 1860 ====
1860 New South Wales colonial election: Carcoar Tuesday 11 December
Candidate	Votes	%
William Watt (re-elected)	202	55.0
James Murphy	165	45.0
Total formal votes	367	98.9
Informal votes	4	1.1
Turnout	371	46.5

=== Elections in the 1850s ===
==== 1859 ====
1859 New South Wales colonial election: Carcoar Tuesday 21 June
Candidate	Votes	%
William Watt (elected)	unopposed	
