= Members of the New South Wales Legislative Assembly, 1874–1877 =

Members of the New South Wales Legislative Assembly who served in the eighth parliament of New South Wales held their seats from 1874 to 1877. The 1874–75 election was held between 8 December 1874 and 12 January 1875 with parliament first meeting on 27 January 1875. There were 72 members elected for 52 single member electorates, 6 two member electorates and 2 four member electorates. During this parliament the number of graduates of Sydney University exceeded 100 and the seat of University of Sydney was created. The maximum term of this parliament was 3 years and the assembly was dissolved after 34 months. Premiers during this parliament were Sir John Robertson 9 February 1875 till 22 March 1877 and from 17 August 1877 and Sir Henry Parkes 22 March 1877 till 17 August 1877. The Speaker was William Arnold until his death on 1 March 1875 and then George Allen.

Name	Electorate	Years in office
Robert Abbott	Tenterfield	1872–1877, 1880–1882
George Allen	Glebe	1869–1883
William Arnold (Note: Paterson MLA William Arnold died on 1 March 1875. The resulting by-election was won by Herbert Brown on 18 March 1875.)	Paterson	1856–1875
Ezekial Baker	Goldfields South	1870–1877, 1879–1881, 1884–1887
Thomas Bawden	Clarence	1869–1880
Hanley Bennett (Note: Parramatta MLA Hugh Taylor resigned after he was referred to the Committee of Elections and Qualifications as to whether he had a contract with the government. He was re-elected at the resulting by-election on 20 April 1876.)	Liverpool Plains	1872–1880
John Booth	East Macquarie	1872–1877
Herbert Brown	Paterson	1875–1898
Stephen Brown	Newtown	1864–1881
Thomas Brown (Note: Hartley MLA Thomas Brown's election was declared void as he held a position of profit under the crown in March 1876. The resulting by-election was won by John Hurley (b.1844) on 21 April 1876.)	Hartley	1872–1876
William Browne	Patrick's Plains	1872–1880
David Buchanan	Goldfields West	1860–1862, 1864–1867, 1869–1877, 1879–1885, 1888–1889
John Burns	Hunter	1861–1869, 1872–1891
Edward Butler	Argyle	1869–1877
Charles Byrnes	Parramatta	1874–1877, 1880–1882
Angus Cameron	West Sydney	1874–1889, 1894–1896
Samuel Charles	Kiama	1874–1880
Henry Clarke	Eden	1869–1894, 1895–1904
Henry Cohen	West Maitland	1874–1885
Edward Combes (Note: Orange MLA Harris Nelson resigned in January 1877. The resulting by-election on 22 February 1877 was won by Edward Combes.)	Orange	1872–1874, 1877–1885
James Cunneen	Wollombi	1860–1869, 1872–1877
Henry Dangar	West Sydney	1874–1877, 1880–1882
Thomas Dangar	Gwydir	1865–1885, 1887–1890
John Davies	East Sydney	1874–1887
George Day	Hume	1874–1889
George Dibbs	West Sydney	1874–1877, 1882–1895
Richard Driver	Windsor	1860–1880
James Farnell	St Leonards	1860–1860, 1864–1885, 1887–1888
Michael Fitzpatrick	Yass Plains	1869–1881
Robert Forster	Goldfields North	1862–1864, 1870–1872, 1874–1877
William Forster (Note: Murrumbidgee MLA William Forster resigned to accept the position of assistant to the Agent-General Charles Cowper in February 1876. The resulting by-election was won by Joseph Leary on 6 March 1876.)	Murrumbidgee	1856–1860, 1861–1864, 1864–1869, 1869–1874, 1875–1876, 1880–1882
Thomas Garrett	Camden	1860–1871, 1872–1891
Stephen Goold (Note: Mudgee MLA Stephen Goold died on 28 August 1876. The resulting by-election was won by Richard Rouse on 5 October 1876.)	Mudgee	1874–1876
Samuel Gray	Illawarra	1859–1864, 1874–1880, 1882–1885
Edward Greville	Braidwood	1870–1880
William Hay	Murray	1872–1877, 1880–1882
Richard Hill	Canterbury	1868–1877
James Hoskins	Tumut	1859–1863, 1868–1882
Thomas Hungerford (Note: Upper Hunter MLA Francis White died on 4 May 1875. The resulting by-election was won by Thomas Hungerford on 7 June 1875.) (Note: Upper Hunter MLA Thomas Hungerford's election was declared void in July 1875. The resulting by-election was won by John McElhone on 5 August 1875.)	Upper Hunter	1875-1875, 1877–1882, 1885–1887
John Hurley (b.1796)	Narellan	1859–1860, 1864–1869, 1872–1880
John Hurley (b.1844)	Hartley	1872–1874, 1876–1880, 1887–1891, 1901–1907
Archibald Jacob	Lower Hunter	1872–1882
William Johnston (Note: Williams MLA William Watson resigned in January 1877. The resulting by-election on 12 February 1877 was won by William Johnston.)	Williams	1877–1880
John Lackey	Central Cumberland	1860–1864, 1867–1880
Joseph Leary	Murrumbidgee	1860–1864, 1869–1872, 1876–1880
George Lloyd	Newcastle	1869–1877, 1880–1882, 1885–1887
George Lord	Bogan	1856–1877
William Long (Note: Central Cumberland MLA Joseph Wearne resigned due to financial difficulties in June 1875. The resulting by-election on 28 June 1875 was won by William Long.)	Central Cumberland	1875–1880
John Lucas	Canterbury	1860–1869, 1871–1880
Andrew Lynch (Note: Carcoar MLA Solomon Meyer resigned in May 1876. The resulting by-election on 21 June 1876 was won by Andrew Lynch.)	Carcoar	1876–1884
John Macintosh	East Sydney	1872–1880
John McElhone	Upper Hunter	1875–1889, 1895–1898
Solomon Meyer	Carcoar	1874–1876
Alexander Montague	Monaro	1874–1877
Henry Moses	Hawkesbury	1869–1880, 1882–1885
Harris Nelson	Orange	1872–1877
Arthur Onslow	Camden	1869–1880
Sir Henry Parkes	East Sydney	1856, 1858, 1859–1861, 1864–1870, 1872–1895
Joseph Phelps	Balranald	1864–1877
William Piddington	Hawkesbury	1856–1877
Charles Pilcher	West Macquarie	1874–1882
Sir John Robertson	West Sydney	1856–1861, 1862–1865, 1865–1866, 1866–1870, 1870–1877, 1877–1878, 1882–1886
Richard Rouse	Mudgee	1876–1879
Stephen Scholey	East Maitland	1872–1878
Patrick Shepherd	Nepean	1874–1877
John Smith	Wellington	1872–1877
Robert Smith	Hastings	1870–1889
Charles Stevens (Note: Northumberland MLA Charles Stevens resigned due to financial difficulties in May 1877. The resulting by-election on 20 July 1877 was won by William Turner.)	Northumberland	1874–1877
Alexander Stuart	East Sydney	1874–1885
John Sutherland	Paddington	1860–1881, 1882–1889
Francis Suttor	Bathurst	1875–1890
William Suttor	East Macquarie	1875–1879
Hugh Taylor	Parramatta	1872–1880, 1882–1894
William Teece	Goulburn	1872–1880
Samuel Terry	New England	1859–1869, 1871–1881
William Turner	Northumberland	1877-1877, 1880–1881
James Warden	Shoalhaven	1871–1877
James Watson	Lachlan	1869–1882, 1884–1885
William Watson	Williams	1874–1877
Joseph Wearne	Central Cumberland	1869–1875
Francis White	Upper Hunter	1874–1875
William Windeyer (Note: Having passed the threshold of 100 graduates the seat of University of Sydney was created. William Windeyer won the resulting by-election on 8 September 1876.)	University of Sydney	1859–1862, 1866–1872, 1876–1879
Robert Wisdom	Morpeth	1859–1872, 1874–1887
John Wright	Queanbeyan	1874–1877

== See also ==
- Third Robertson ministry
- Second Parkes ministry
- Results of the 1874–75 New South Wales colonial election
- Candidates of the 1874–75 New South Wales colonial election

== Notes ==
There was no party system in New South Wales politics until 1887. Under the constitution, ministers were required to resign to recontest their seats in a by-election when appointed. These by-elections are only noted when the minister was defeated; in general, he was elected unopposed.
