= Results of the 1874–75 New South Wales colonial election =

Colonial election for New South Wales, Australia in 1874-75

New South Wales colonial election, 8 December 1874 – 12 January 1875 Legislative Assembly << 1872–1877 >>
Enrolled voters					
Votes cast	60,031		Turnout	47.21	−1.23
Informal votes	762		Informal	1.20	+0.20
Summary of votes by party
Party	Primary votes	%	Swing	Seats	Change
Total	60,031			72	

The 1874–75 New South Wales colonial election was for 72 members representing 60 electoral districts. The election was conducted on the basis of a simple majority or first-past-the-post voting system. In this election there were 8 multi-member districts returning 20 members and 52 single member districts. In the multi-member districts each elector could vote for as many candidates as there were vacancies. 12 districts were uncontested.

There were three districts that did not have a residential or property qualification, Goldfields North (750), Goldfields South (1,400) and Goldfields West (20,000). The average number of enrolled voters per seat in the other districts was 2,078 ranging from The Paterson (551) to Mudgee (7,401). The electoral boundaries were established under the Electoral Act 1858 (NSW).

== Election results ==
=== Argyle ===
1874–75 New South Wales colonial election: Argyle Saturday 2 January 1875
Candidate	Votes	%
Edward Butler (re-elected)	unopposed	

=== Balranald ===
1874–75 New South Wales colonial election: Balranald Monday 11 January 1875
Candidate	Votes	%
Joseph Phelps (re-elected)	unopposed	

=== Bathurst ===
1874–75 New South Wales colonial election: Bathurst Saturday 2 January 1875
Candidate	Votes	%
Francis Suttor (elected)	555	59.2
Edmund Webb (defeated)	383	40.8
Total formal votes	938	100.0
Informal votes	0	0.0
Turnout	968	72.9

The sitting member for Bathurst Edward Combes did not contest the election. Edmund Webb was the sitting member for West Macquarie.

=== The Bogan ===
1874–75 New South Wales colonial election: The Bogan Monday 4 January 1875
Candidate	Votes	%
George Lord (re-elected)	1,071	64.9
Arthur Burne	290	17.6
John Kelly	273	16.5
John Ardill	17	1.0
Total formal votes	1,651	98.3
Informal votes	29	1.7
Turnout	1,680	32.0

=== Braidwood ===
1874–75 New South Wales colonial election: Braidwood Monday 28 December 1874
Candidate	Votes	%
Edward Greville (re-elected)	unopposed	

=== Camden ===
1874–75 New South Wales colonial election: Camden Monday 4 January 1875
Candidate	Votes	%
Thomas Garrett (re-elected 1)	807	40.8
Arthur Onslow (re-elected 2)	717	36.2
James Nichols	456	23.0
Total formal votes	1,980	100.0
Informal votes	0	0.0
Turnout	1,437	48.7

=== Canterbury ===
1874–75 New South Wales colonial election: Canterbury Monday 28 December 1874
Candidate	Votes	%
Richard Hill (re-elected 1)	1,791	35.9
John Lucas (re-elected 2)	1,689	33.9
William Pigott	1,429	28.7
Aaron Wheeler	77	1.5
Total formal votes	4,986	100.0
Informal votes	0	0.0
Turnout	3,393	62.3

=== Carcoar ===
1874–75 New South Wales colonial election: Carcoar Monday 28 December 1874
Candidate	Votes	%
Solomon Meyer (elected)	523	50.4
T R Icely	514	49.6
Total formal votes	1,037	97.5
Informal votes	27	2.5
Turnout	1,064	52.0

=== The Clarence ===
1874–75 New South Wales colonial election: The Clarence Tuesday 22 December 1874
Candidate	Votes	%
Thomas Bawden (re-elected)	1,090	50.3
Charles Fawcett	833	38.4
Edward Madgwick	245	11.3
Total formal votes	2,168	97.8
Informal votes	50	2.3
Turnout	2,218	51.1

=== Central Cumberland ===
1874–75 New South Wales colonial election: Central Cumberland Friday 8 January 1875
Candidate	Votes	%
John Lackey (re-elected 1)	692	28.9
Joseph Wearne (elected 2)	624	26.0
Joseph O'Connor	391	16.3
Andrew McCulloch	328	13.7
Charles Jeanneret	256	10.7
Nicholas Raven	99	4.1
Maurice Reynolds	8	0.3
Total formal votes	2,398	100.0
Informal votes	0	0.0
Turnout	2,398	55.1

=== East Macquarie ===
1874–75 New South Wales colonial election: East Macquarie Tuesday 5 January 1875
Candidate	Votes	%
William Suttor (elected 1)	750	38.4
John Booth (elected 2)	607	31.1
William Cummings (defeated)	546	28.0
James Daley	49	2.5
Total formal votes	1,952	98.5
Informal votes	30	1.5
Turnout	1,432	49.9

=== East Maitland ===
1874–75 New South Wales colonial election: East Maitland Wednesday 16 December 1874
Candidate	Votes	%
Stephen Scholey (re-elected)	252	52.9
Alexander Dodds	221	46.4
Abel Cobcroft	3	0.6
William Miles	0	0.0
Total formal votes	476	94.6
Informal votes	27	5.4
Turnout	503	66.4

=== East Sydney ===
1874–75 New South Wales colonial election: East Sydney Wednesday 9 December 1874
Candidate	Votes	%
Henry Parkes (re-elected 1)	3,828	17.9
John Macintosh (re-elected 2)	3,651	17.1
Alexander Stuart (elected 3)	3,083	14.4
John Davies (elected 4)	2,394	11.2
Angus Cameron	2,189	10.3
Charles Moore (defeated)	1,960	9.2
William Forster (defeated)	1,502	7.0
John Young	1,140	5.3
Edward Flood	804	3.8
James Pemell	661	3.1
Daniel O'Connell	68	0.3
John Douglass	50	0.2
Nathaniel Pawsey	23	0.1
Total formal votes	21,353	100.0
Informal votes	0	0.0
Turnout	6,430	56.4

=== Eden ===
1874–75 New South Wales colonial election: Eden Monday 28 December 1874
Candidate	Votes	%
Henry Clarke (re-elected)	667	74.4
William Clements	230	25.6
Total formal votes	897	100.0
Informal votes	0	0.0
Turnout	897	48.0

=== The Glebe ===
1874–75 New South Wales colonial election: The Glebe Friday 11 December 1874
Candidate	Votes	%
George Allen (re-elected)	1,239	60.0
John Booth (defeated)	813	39.4
Charles Mossman	14	0.7
Total formal votes	2,066	96.1
Informal votes	83	3.9
Turnout	2,149	68.1

=== Goldfields North ===
1874–75 New South Wales colonial election: Goldfields North Monday 11 January 1875
Candidate	Votes	%
Robert Forster (elected)	497	84.8
Thomas Browne	89	15.2
Total formal votes	586	100.0
Informal votes	0	0.0
Turnout	586	78.1

=== Goldfields South ===
1874–75 New South Wales colonial election: Goldfields South Monday 11 January 1875
Candidate	Votes	%
Ezekiel Baker (re-elected)	381	58.2
Henry Copeland	274	41.8
Total formal votes	655	100.0
Informal votes	0	0.0
Turnout	655	46.8

=== Goldfields West ===
1874–75 New South Wales colonial election: Goldfields West Monday 11 January 1875
Candidate	Votes	%
David Buchanan (re-elected)	1,446	89.8
J P Sweeney	164	10.2
Total formal votes	1,610	98.2
Informal votes	30	1.8
Turnout	1,640	8.2

=== Goulburn ===
1874–75 New South Wales colonial election: Goulburn Tuesday 22 December 1874
Candidate	Votes	%
William Teece (re-elected)	unopposed	

=== The Gwydir ===
1874–75 New South Wales colonial election: The Gwydir Saturday 26 December 1874
Candidate	Votes	%
Thomas Dangar (re-elected)	540	58.2
Captain W H Mosely	388	41.8
Total formal votes	928	98.5
Informal votes	14	1.5
Turnout	942	37.3

=== Hartley ===
1874–75 New South Wales colonial election: Hartley Monday 21 December 1874
Candidate	Votes	%
Thomas Brown (re-elected)	unopposed	

=== The Hastings ===
1874–75 New South Wales colonial election: The Hastings Thursday 24 December 1874
Candidate	Votes	%
Robert Smith (re-elected)	unopposed	

=== The Hawkesbury ===
1874–75 New South Wales colonial election: The Hawkesbury Monday 28 December 1874
Candidate	Votes	%
Henry Moses (re-elected 1)	475	40.5
William Piddington (re-elected 2)	467	39.9
George Davies	230	19.6
Total formal votes	1,172	100.0
Informal votes	0	0.0
Turnout	1,172	43.1

=== The Hume ===
1874–75 New South Wales colonial election: The Hume Tuesday 29 December 1874
Candidate	Votes	%
George Day (elected)	456	84.4
Thomas Robertson (defeated)	84	15.6
Total formal votes	540	97.5
Informal votes	14	2.5
Turnout	554	20.6

=== The Hunter ===
1874–75 New South Wales colonial election: The Hunter Saturday 2 January 1875
Candidate	Votes	%
John Burns (re-elected)	457	74.7
James O'Sullivan	155	25.3
Total formal votes	612	96.8
Informal votes	20	3.2
Turnout	632	50.6

=== Illawarra ===
1874–75 New South Wales colonial election: Illawarra Monday 28 December 1874
Candidate	Votes	%
Samuel Gray (elected)	504	56.8
Andrew Lysaght	384	43.2
Total formal votes	888	100.0
Informal votes	0	0.0
Turnout	888	69.0

=== Kiama ===
1874–75 New South Wales colonial election: Kiama Friday 18 December 1874
Candidate	Votes	%
Samuel Charles (elected)	405	53.2
John Stewart (defeated)	357	46.9
Total formal votes	762	100.0
Informal votes	0	0.0
Turnout	776	66.3

=== The Lachlan ===
1874–75 New South Wales colonial election: The Lachlan Tuesday 12 January 1875
Candidate	Votes	%
James Watson (re-elected)	unopposed	
Total formal votes	0	100.0
Informal votes	0	0.0
Turnout	0	0.0

=== Liverpool Plains ===
1874–75 New South Wales colonial election: Liverpool Plains Wednesday 6 January 1875
Candidate	Votes	%
Hanley Bennett (re-elected)	766	51.5
Daniel Macquarie	721	48.5
Total formal votes	1,487	97.8
Informal votes	33	2.2
Turnout	1,520	47.6

=== The Lower Hunter ===
1874–75 New South Wales colonial election: The Lower Hunter Monday 4 January 1875
Candidate	Votes	%
Archibald Jacob (re-elected)	259	53.7
Walter Cooper	219	45.4
Archibald Hamilton	4	0.8
Total formal votes	482	96.8
Informal votes	16	3.2
Turnout	498	75.3

=== Monara ===
1874–75 New South Wales colonial election: Monara Tuesday 5 January 1875
Candidate	Votes	%
Alexander Montague (elected)	562	47.4
H M Joseph	502	42.3
Daniel O'Connell	123	10.4
Total formal votes	1,187	100.0
Informal votes	0	0.0
Turnout	1,187	56.1

=== Morpeth ===
1874–75 New South Wales colonial election: Morpeth Thursday 17 December 1874
Candidate	Votes	%
Robert Wisdom (elected)	300	56.9
Pierce O'Keeffe	177	33.6
Myles McRae	50	9.5
William Bellamy	0	0.0
Total formal votes	527	95.6
Informal votes	24	4.4
Turnout	551	71.7

=== Mudgee ===
1874–75 New South Wales colonial election: Mudgee Wednesday 23 December 1874
Candidate	Votes	%
Stephen Goold (elected)	1,660	56.6
Patrick Jennings	1,271	43.4
Total formal votes	2,931	100.0
Informal votes	0	0.0
Turnout	2,930	49.6

=== The Murray ===
1874–75 New South Wales colonial election: The Murray Thursday 7 January 1875
Candidate	Votes	%
William Hay (re-elected)	469	58.6
Robert Barbour	331	41.4
Total formal votes	800	100.0
Informal votes	0	0.0
Turnout	800	64.8

=== The Murrumbidgee ===
1874–75 New South Wales colonial election: The Murrumbidgee Saturday 2 January 1875
Candidate	Votes	%
William Forster (elected)	559	55.3
Joseph Leary	384	38.0
Charles Bardwell	68	6.7
Thomas Mate	0	0.0
Total formal votes	1,011	98.7
Informal votes	13	1.3
Turnout	1,024	34.0

=== Narellan ===
1874–75 New South Wales colonial election: Narellan Thursday 17 December 1874
Candidate	Votes	%
John Hurley (b 1796) (re-elected)	unopposed	

=== The Nepean ===
1874–75 New South Wales colonial election: The Nepean Wednesday 23 December 1874
Candidate	Votes	%
Patrick Shepherd (elected)	372	55.9
James Ryan	294	44.1
Total formal votes	666	95.7
Informal votes	30	4.3
Turnout	686	63.1

=== New England ===
1874–75 New South Wales colonial election: New England Thursday 7 January 1875
Candidate	Votes	%
Samuel Terry (re-elected)	unopposed	

=== Newcastle ===
1874–75 New South Wales colonial election: Newcastle Tuesday 8 December 1874
Candidate	Votes	%
George Lloyd (re-elected)	641	52.8
Charles Stevens	574	47.2
Total formal votes	1,215	98.5
Informal votes	18	1.5
Turnout	1,233	76.4

=== Newtown ===
1874–75 New South Wales colonial election: Newtown Monday 14 December 1874
Candidate	Votes	%
Stephen Brown (re-elected)	unopposed	

=== Northumberland ===
1874–75 New South Wales colonial election: Northumberland Thursday 17 December 1874
Candidate	Votes	%
Charles Stevens (elected)	1,305	54.7
James Hannell (defeated)	1,083	45.4
Total formal votes	2,388	97.6
Informal votes	59	2.4
Turnout	2,447	79.1

=== Orange ===
1874–75 New South Wales colonial election: Orange Thursday 17 December 1874
Candidate	Votes	%
Harris Nelson (re-elected)	550	79.1
James Johns	139	20.0
Richard Sheridan	6	0.9
Total formal votes	695	97.6
Informal votes	17	2.4
Turnout	712	34.1

=== Paddington ===
1874–75 New South Wales colonial election: Paddington Thursday 10 December 1874
Candidate	Votes	%
John Sutherland (re-elected)	unopposed	

=== Parramatta ===
1874–75 New South Wales colonial election: Parramatta Thursday 10 December 1874
Candidate	Votes	%
Hugh Taylor (re-elected 1)	480	40.8
Charles Byrnes (elected 2)	361	30.7
James Farnell (defeated)	335	28.5
Total formal votes	1,176	100.0
Informal votes	0	0.0
Turnout	898	61.0

=== The Paterson ===
1874–75 New South Wales colonial election: The Paterson Friday 18 December 1874
Candidate	Votes	%
William Arnold (re-elected)	205	56.9
Herbert Brown	155	43.1
Total formal votes	360	100.0
Informal votes	0	0.0
Turnout	368	66.8

=== Patrick's Plains ===
1874–75 New South Wales colonial election: Patrick's Plains Wednesday 16 December 1874
Candidate	Votes	%
William Browne (re-elected)	664	75.0
Alexander Bowman	221	25.0
Total formal votes	885	98.1
Informal votes	17	1.9
Turnout	902	58.4

=== Queanbeyan ===
1874–75 New South Wales colonial election: Queanbeyan Wednesday 23 December 1874
Candidate	Votes	%
John Wright (elected)	455	53.3
William Forster	354	41.5
William O'Neill	44	5.2
Total formal votes	853	98.2
Informal votes	16	1.8
Turnout	869	69.6

=== Shoalhaven ===
1874–75 New South Wales colonial election: Shoalhaven Friday 18 December 1874
Candidate	Votes	%
James Warden (re-elected)	unopposed	

=== St Leonards ===
1874–75 New South Wales colonial election: St Leonards Monday 21 December 1874
Candidate	Votes	%
James Farnell (elected)	856	64.0
Bernard Holtermann	471	35.2
James French	7	0.5
Edward Lord	4	0.3
Total formal votes	1,338	100.0
Informal votes	0	0.0
Turnout	1,338	59.8

=== Tenterfield ===
1874–75 New South Wales colonial election: Tenterfield Tuesday 29 December 1874
Candidate	Votes	%
Robert Abbott (re-elected)	999	58.8
Colin Fraser	624	36.7
W Bourke	77	4.5
Total formal votes	1,700	94.8
Informal votes	93	5.2
Turnout	1,793	49.6

=== The Tumut ===
1874–75 New South Wales colonial election: The Tumut Saturday 2 January 1875
Candidate	Votes	%
James Hoskins (re-elected)	590	68.5
Thomas O'Mara	272	31.6
Total formal votes	862	98.3
Informal votes	15	1.7
Turnout	877	44.6

=== The Upper Hunter ===
1874–75 New South Wales colonial election: The Upper Hunter Monday 28 December 1874
Candidate	Votes	%
Francis White (elected)	673	52.3
Thomas Hungerford	331	25.7
John Smart	153	11.9
William Gordon	129	10.0
Total formal votes	1,286	100.0
Informal votes	0	0.0
Turnout	1,286	46.0

=== Wellington ===
1874–75 New South Wales colonial election: Wellington Thursday 7 January 1875
Candidate	Votes	%
John Smith (re-elected)	573	41.2
Thomas Wythes	524	37.7
John Hurley (b 1844) (defeated)	294	21.1
Total formal votes	1,391	98.3
Informal votes	24	1.7
Turnout	1,415	52.4

=== West Macquarie ===
1874–75 New South Wales colonial election: West Macquarie Monday 4 January 1875
Candidate	Votes	%
Charles Pilcher (elected)	425	58.7
Henry Rotton	299	41.3
Total formal votes	724	97.8
Informal votes	16	2.2
Turnout	740	57.7

The sitting member for West Macquarie was Edmund Webb who unsuccessfully contested Bathurst.

=== West Maitland ===
1874–75 New South Wales colonial election: West Maitland Monday 21 December 1874
Candidate	Votes	%
Henry Cohen (elected)	343	49.2
Joseph Eckford	196	28.1
Archibald Hamilton	152	21.8
William Farthing	5	0.7
William Brooks	1	0.1
Total formal votes	697	98.0
Informal votes	14	2.0
Turnout	711	67.9

=== West Sydney ===
1874–75 New South Wales colonial election: West Sydney Wednesday 16 December 1874
Candidate	Votes	%
John Robertson (re-elected 1)	2,705	17.6
George Dibbs (elected 2)	2,294	15.0
Henry Dangar (elected 3)	2,207	14.4
Angus Cameron (elected 4)	2,129	13.9
George Thornton	1,888	12.3
Joseph Wearne (defeated)	1,746	11.4
Joseph O'Connor (defeated)	1,659	10.8
Walter Cooper (defeated)	436	2.8
Joseph Raphael (defeated)	267	1.7
Total formal votes	15,331	100.0
Informal votes	0	0.0
Turnout	5,574	63.0

=== The Williams ===
1874–75 New South Wales colonial election: The Williams Thursday 31 December 1874
Candidate	Votes	%
William Watson (elected)	400	51.8
George Stephen	373	48.3
Total formal votes	773	97.6
Informal votes	19	2.4
Turnout	792	59.6

=== Windsor ===
1874–75 New South Wales colonial election: Windsor Wednesday 16 December 1874
Candidate	Votes	%
Richard Driver (re-elected)	255	57.6
William Walker	188	42.4
Total formal votes	443	100.0
Informal votes	0	0.0
Turnout	443	80.0

=== Wollombi ===
1874–75 New South Wales colonial election: Wollombi Monday 14 December 1874
Candidate	Votes	%
James Cunneen (re-elected)	432	68.3
Joseph Eckford	201	31.8
Total formal votes	633	100.0
Informal votes	0	0.0
Turnout	633	61.6

=== Yass Plains ===
1874–75 New South Wales colonial election: Yass Plains Friday 18 December 1874
Candidate	Votes	%
Michael Fitzpatrick (re-elected)	412	53.2
Arthur Remmington	362	46.8
Total formal votes	774	98.2
Informal votes	14	1.8
Turnout	788	43.8

== See also ==
- Candidates of the 1874–75 New South Wales colonial election
- Members of the New South Wales Legislative Assembly, 1874–1877
