= Candidates of the 1874–75 New South Wales colonial election =

This is a list of candidates for the 1874–75 New South Wales colonial election. The election was held from 8 December 1874 to 12 January 1875.

There was no recognisable party structure at this election.

== Retiring Members ==
Goldfields North MLA James Rodd had resigned on 16 November 1874 and writs issued for a by-election, which was cancelled when the general election was called.

- James Campbell MLA (Morpeth)
- Edward Combes MLA (Bathurst)
- John Creed MLA (Upper Hunter)
- Leopold De Salis MLA (Queanbeyan)
- William Grahame MLA (Monaro)
- Lewis Levy MLA (West Maitland)
- William Macleay MLA (Murrumbidgee)
- John Nowlan MLA (Williams)
- George Oakes MLA (East Sydney)
- Joseph Single MLA (Nepean)
- William Tunks MLA (St Leonards)
- Thomas West MLA (Carcoar)

== Legislative Assembly ==
Sitting members are shown in bold text. Successful candidates are highlighted.

Electorates are arranged chronologically from the day the poll was held. Because of the sequence of polling, some sitting members who were defeated in their constituencies were then able to contest other constituencies later in the polling period. On the second occasion, these members are shown in italic text.

Electorate	Successful candidates	Unsuccessful candidates
Tuesday 8 December 1874
Newcastle	**George Lloyd**	Charles Stevens
Wednesday 9 December 1874
East Sydney	John Davies; **John Macintosh**; **Henry Parkes**; Alexander Stuart	Angus Cameron; J B Douglass; Edward Flood; **William Forster**; **Charles Moore**; Daniel O'Connell; Nathaniel Pawsey; James Pemell; John Young
Thursday 10 December 1874
Paddington	**John Sutherland**	
Parramatta	Charles Byrnes; **Hugh Taylor**	**James Farnell**
Friday 11 December 1874
Glebe	**George Allen**	**John Booth**; Charles Mossman
Monday 14 December 1874
Newtown	**Stephen Brown**	
Wollombi	**James Cunneen**	Joseph Eckford
Wednesday 16 December 1874
East Maitland	**Stephen Scholey**	Abel Cobcroft; Alexander Dodds; William Miles
Patrick's Plains	**William Browne**	Alexander Bowman
West Sydney	Angus Cameron; Henry Dangar; George Dibbs; **John Robertson**	**Walter Cooper**; **Joseph O'Connor**; **Joseph Raphael**; George Thornton; **Joseph Wearne**
Windsor	**Richard Driver**	William Walker
Thursday 17 December 1874
Morpeth	Robert Wisdom	William Bellamy; Myles McRae; Pierce O'Keeffe
Narellan	**John Hurley (b 1796)**	
Northumberland	Charles Stevens	**James Hannell**
Orange	**Harris Nelson**	James Johns; Richard Sheridan
Friday 18 December 1874
Kiama	Samuel Charles	**John Stewart**
Paterson	**William Arnold**	Herbert Brown
Shoalhaven	**James Warden**	
Yass Plains	**Michael Fitzpatrick**	Arthur Remmington
Monday 21 December 1874
Hartley	**Thomas Brown**	
St Leonards	James Farnell	James French; Bernhardt Holtermann; Edward Lord
West Maitland	Henry Cohen	William Brooks; Joseph Eckford; William Farthing; Archibald Hamilton
Tuesday 22 December 1874
Clarence	**Thomas Bawden**	Charles Fawcett; Edward Madgwick
Goulburn	**William Teece**	
Wednesday 23 December 1874
Mudgee	Stephen Goold	Patrick Jennings
Nepean	Patrick Shepherd	James Ryan
Queanbeyan	John Wright	William Forster; William O'Neill
Thursday 24 December 1874
Hastings	**Robert Smith**	
Saturday 26 December 1874
Gwydir	**Thomas Dangar**	W H Mosely
Monday 28 December 1874
Braidwood	**Edward Greville**	
Canterbury	**Richard Hill**; **John Lucas**	William Pigott; Aaron Wheeler
Carcoar	Solomon Meyer	T R Icely
Eden	**Henry Clarke**	William Clements
Hawkesbury	**Henry Moses**; **William Piddington**	George Davies
Illawarra	Samuel Gray	Andrew Lysaght
Upper Hunter	Francis White	William Gordon; Thomas Hungerford; John Smart
Tuesday 29 December 1874
Hume	George Day	**Thomas Robertson**
Tenterfield	**Robert Abbott**	W D Bourke; Colin Fraser
Thursday 31 December 1874
Williams	William Watson	George Stephen
Saturday 2 January 1875
Argyle	**Edward Butler**	
Bathurst	Francis Suttor	**Edmund Webb**
Hunter	**John Burns**	James O'Sullivan
Murrumbidgee	William Forster	Charles Bardwell; Joseph Leary; Thomas Mate
Tumut	**James Hoskins**	Thomas O'Mara
Monday 4 January 1875
Bogan	**George Lord**	John Ardill; Arthur Burne; John Kelly
Camden	**Thomas Garrett**; **Arthur Onslow**	James Nichols
Lower Hunter	**Archibald Jacob**	Walter Cooper; Archibald Hamilton
West Macquarie	Charles Pilcher	Henry Rotton
Tuesday 5 January 1875
East Macquarie	John Booth; William Suttor	**William Cummings**; James Daley
Monaro	Alexander Montague	H M Joseph; Daniel O'Connell
Wednesday 6 January 1875
Liverpool Plains	**Hanley Bennett**	Daniel Macquarie
Thursday 7 January 1875
Murray	**William Hay**	Robert Barbour
New England	**Samuel Terry**	
Wellington	**John Smith**	**John Hurley (b 1844)**; Thomas Wythes
Friday 8 January 1875
Central Cumberland	**John Lackey**; Joseph Wearne	Charles Jeanneret; Andrew McCulloch; Joseph O'Connor; Nicholas Raven; Maurice Reynolds
Monday 11 January 1875
Balranald	**Joseph Phelps**	
Goldfields North	Robert Forster	Thomas Browne
Goldfields South	**Ezekiel Baker**	Henry Copeland
Goldfields West	**David Buchanan**	J P Sweeney
Tuesday 12 January 1875
Lachlan	**James Watson**	

== See also ==
- Members of the New South Wales Legislative Assembly, 1874–1877
