= Results of the 1882 New South Wales colonial election =

Colonial election for New South Wales, Australia in 1882

New South Wales colonial election, 30 November – 21 December 1882 Legislative Assembly << 1880–1885 >>
Enrolled voters					
Votes cast	164,515		Turnout	56.69	−5.25
Informal votes	2,047		Informal	2.10	+0.14
Summary of votes by party
Party	Primary votes	%	Swing	Seats	Change
Total	164,515			113	

The 1882 New South Wales colonial election was for 113 members representing 72 electoral districts. The election was conducted on the basis of a simple majority or first-past-the-post voting system. In this election there were 32 multi-member districts returning 73 members and 40 single member districts. In the multi-member districts each elector could vote for as many candidates as there were vacancies. 13 districts were uncontested. There was no recognisable party structure at this election. The average number of enrolled voters per seat was 1,701, ranging from East Maitland (984) to Wentworth (2,977).

The electoral boundaries were established under the Electoral Act 1880 (NSW), which provided that a district would return a second member if the electoral roll reached 3,000, a third member upon reaching 5,000 and a fourth member on reaching 8,000. At this election there were five districts which returned an additional member, Balmain, Bourke, Canterbury, Redfern and St Leonards.

== Election results ==
=== Albury ===
1882 New South Wales colonial election: Albury Monday 4 December
Candidate	Votes	%
George Day (re-elected)	294	40.2
James Hayes	275	37.6
Luke Gulson	162	22.2
Total formal votes	731	97.9
Informal votes	16	2.1
Turnout	747	65.8

=== Argyle ===
1882 New South Wales colonial election: Argyle Monday 11 December
Candidate	Votes	%
John Gannon (re-elected 1)	1,323	45.7
William Holborow (re-elected 2)	825	28.5
George Ranken	748	25.8
Total formal votes	2,896	99.6
Informal votes	12	0.4
Turnout	1,610	58.4

=== Balmain ===
1882 New South Wales colonial election: Balmain Saturday 2 December
Candidate	Votes	%
Jacob Garrard (re-elected 1)	1,514	35.6
William Hutchinson (elected 2)	1,238	29.1
John Taylor	1,166	27.4
William Pritchard	334	7.9
Total formal votes	4,252	98.3
Informal votes	72	1.7
Turnout	2,813	64.6
	(1 new seat)	

=== Balranald ===
1882 New South Wales colonial election: Balranald Wednesday 20 December
Candidate	Votes	%
Robert Wilkinson (re-elected)	unopposed	
John Cramsie (re-elected)	unopposed	

=== Bathurst ===
1882 New South Wales colonial election: Bathurst Saturday 2 December
Candidate	Votes	%
Francis Suttor (re-elected)	504	50.8
Thomas Hellyer	488	49.2
Total formal votes	992	97.7
Informal votes	23	2.3
Turnout	1,015	69.4

=== The Bogan ===
1882 New South Wales colonial election: The Bogan Tuesday 19 December
Candidate	Votes	%
George Cass (re-elected 1)	1,152	38.6
Sir Patrick Jennings (re-elected 2)	1,134	38.0
William Forlonge	701	23.5
Total formal votes	2,987	98.8
Informal votes	35	1.2
Turnout	3,022	42.7

=== Boorowa ===
1882 New South Wales colonial election: Boorowa Wednesday 13 December
Candidate	Votes	%
Thomas Slattery (re-elected)	unopposed	

=== Bourke ===
1882 New South Wales colonial election: Bourke Tuesday 19 December
Candidate	Votes	%
Russell Barton (re-elected 1)	573	44.2
Richard Machattie (elected 2)	395	30.5
Thomas Matthews	329	25.4
Total formal votes	1,297	98.0
Informal votes	26	2.0
Turnout	1,323	17.0
	(1 new seat)	

=== Braidwood ===
1882 New South Wales colonial election: Braidwood Saturday 9 December
Candidate	Votes	%
Alexander Ryrie (re-elected)	unopposed	

=== Camden ===
1882 New South Wales colonial election: Camden Saturday 2 December
Candidate	Votes	%
William McCourt (elected 1)	1,369	36.0
Thomas Garrett (re-elected 2)	1,233	32.5
John Kidd (defeated)	1,197	31.5
Total formal votes	3,799	99.3
Informal votes	28	0.7
Turnout	2,335	59.4

=== Canterbury ===
1882 New South Wales colonial election: Canterbury Saturday 9 December
Candidate	Votes	%
William Pigott (re-elected 1)	2,638	27.5
Septimus Stephen (elected 2)	1,933	20.1
Henry Moses (elected 3)	1,256	13.1
Mark Hammond	1,143	11.9
William Henson (defeated)	1,117	11.6
Joseph Mitchell	879	9.2
William Archer	633	6.6
Total formal votes	9,599	98.7
Informal votes	124	1.3
Turnout	3,921	58.2
	(1 new seat)	

Joseph Mitchell had previously been defeated as a sitting member for Newtown.

=== Carcoar ===
1882 New South Wales colonial election: Carcoar Wednesday 6 December
Candidate	Votes	%
George Campbell (re-elected 1)	1,074	40.7
Andrew Lynch (re-elected 2)	833	31.6
Thomas Fitzpatrick	732	27.7
Total formal votes	2,639	99.3
Informal votes	19	0.7
Turnout	1,566	54.8

=== The Clarence ===
1882 New South Wales colonial election: The Clarence Tuesday 12 December
Candidate	Votes	%
John Purves (re-elected)	689	70.0
Richard Stevenson	295	30.0
Total formal votes	984	98.9
Informal votes	11	1.1
Turnout	995	60.7

=== Central Cumberland ===
1882 New South Wales colonial election: Central Cumberland Tuesday 5 December
Candidate	Votes	%
Andrew McCulloch (re-elected 1)	1,419	39.0
John Lackey (re-elected 2)	1,258	34.6
Nathaniel Bull	964	26.5
Total formal votes	3,641	98.9
Informal votes	39	1.1
Turnout	2,404	62.3

=== Durham ===
1882 New South Wales colonial election: Durham Monday 4 December
Candidate	Votes	%
Herbert Brown (re-elected)	unopposed	

=== East Macquarie ===
1882 New South Wales colonial election: East Macquarie Thursday 7 December
Candidate	Votes	%
Sydney Smith (re-elected 1)	unopposed	
Edward Combes (re-elected 2)	unopposed	

=== East Maitland ===
1882 New South Wales colonial election: East Maitland Wednesday 6 December
Candidate	Votes	%
James Brunker (re-elected)	unopposed	

=== East Sydney ===
1882 New South Wales colonial election: East Sydney Thursday 30 November
Candidate	Votes	%
George Reid (re-elected 1)	3,044	20.2
Edmund Barton (re-elected 2)	2,948	19.6
George Griffiths (elected 3)	2,365	15.7
John McElhone (re-elected 4)	2,307	15.3
Sir Henry Parkes (defeated)	2,080	13.8
Arthur Renwick (defeated)	1,651	11.0
James Green	676	4.5
Total formal votes	15,071	99.7
Informal votes	53	0.4
Turnout	4,719	58.7

A sitting member Henry Dangar did not contest the election. Edmund Barton was the member for Wellington and John McElhone was the member for Upper Hunter where he was re-elected. McElhone subsequently resigned from East Sydney causing a by-election. Sir Henry Parkes subsequently nominated for both St Leonards and then Tenterfield where he was elected unopposed. Parkes then withdrew from St Leonards.

=== Eden ===
1882 New South Wales colonial election: Eden Monday 11 December
Candidate	Votes	%
James Garvan (re-elected 2)	unopposed	
Henry Clarke (re-elected 1)	unopposed	
Total formal votes	15,071	99.7
Informal votes	53	0.4
Turnout	4,719	58.7

=== Forbes ===
1882 New South Wales colonial election: Forbes Friday 8 December
Candidate	Votes	%
Walter Coonan (elected 1)	731	36.2
Alfred Stokes (elected 2)	649	32.1
Henry Cooke (defeated)	640	31.7
Total formal votes	2,020	98.9
Informal votes	23	1.1
Turnout	1,523	57.0

Sitting member John Bodel did not contest the election.

=== The Glebe ===
1882 New South Wales colonial election: The Glebe Friday 1 December
Candidate	Votes	%
George Allen (re-elected)	645	61.5
Michael Fitzpatrick	404	38.5
Total formal votes	1,049	97.2
Informal votes	30	2.8
Turnout	1,079	45.7

=== Glen Innes ===
1882 New South Wales colonial election: Glen Innes Wednesday 20 December
Candidate	Votes	%
William Fergusson (re-elected)	unopposed	

=== Gloucester ===
1882 New South Wales colonial election: Gloucester Thursday 21 December
Candidate	Votes	%
Robert White (elected)	445	44.7
Henry Hudson	382	38.4
William Christie	107	10.8
William Johnston	61	6.1
Total formal votes	995	98.8
Informal votes	12	1.2
Turnout	1,007	70.6

Sitting member Archibald Jacob unsuccessfully contested Morpeth.

=== Goulburn ===
1882 New South Wales colonial election: Goulburn Friday 1 December
Candidate	Votes	%
William Teece (re-elected)	unopposed	

=== Grafton ===
1882 New South Wales colonial election: Grafton Saturday 9 December
Candidate	Votes	%
John See (re-elected)	unopposed	

=== Grenfell ===
1882 New South Wales colonial election: Grenfell Friday 8 December
Candidate	Votes	%
Robert Vaughn (re-elected)	404	58.1
E Whelan	291	41.9
Total formal votes	695	97.9
Informal votes	15	2.1
Turnout	706	45.6

=== Gundagai ===
1882 New South Wales colonial election: Gundagai Wednesday 13 December
Candidate	Votes	%
Bruce Smith (re-elected)	588	62.9
Frederick Pinkstone	347	37.1
Total formal votes	935	98.3
Informal votes	16	1.7
Turnout	951	54.5

Bruce Smith had been successful at a by-election on 23 November 1882 however parliament was dissolved on the same day and he could not take his seat.

=== Gunnedah ===
1882 New South Wales colonial election: Gunnedah Wednesday 20 December
Candidate	Votes	%
Joseph Abbott (re-elected)	616	79.3
William Douglass	161	20.7
Total formal votes	777	95.9
Informal votes	33	4.1
Turnout	837	40.1

=== The Gwydir ===
1882 New South Wales colonial election: The Gwydir Wednesday 13 December
Candidate	Votes	%
William Campbell (re-elected)	405	68.4
Thomas Hassall	187	31.6
Total formal votes	592	98.2
Informal votes	11	1.8
Turnout	603	35.8

=== Hartley ===
1882 New South Wales colonial election: Hartley Thursday 14 December
Candidate	Votes	%
Walter Targett (elected)	298	28.4
Charles Passmore	293	28.0
John Shepherd	195	18.6
George Lloyd	174	16.6
John Hughes	88	8.4
Total formal votes	1,048	97.7
Informal votes	25	2.3
Turnout	1,087	54.0

The sitting member Robert Abbott did not contest the election.

=== The Hastings and Manning ===
1882 New South Wales colonial election: The Hastings and Manning Tuesday 12 December
Candidate	Votes	%
James Young (re-elected 1)	946	42.1
Charles Roberts (elected 2)	673	30.0
Daniel Macquarie	627	27.9
Total formal votes	2,246	99.3
Informal votes	15	0.7
Turnout	2,261	47.8

The other sitting member Joseph Andrews did not contest the election.

=== The Hawkesbury ===
1882 New South Wales colonial election: The Hawkesbury Monday 11 December
Candidate	Votes	%
Henry McQuade (elected)	862	53.8
Alexander Bowman (defeated)	739	46.2
Total formal votes	1,601	97.1
Informal votes	48	2.9
Turnout	1,649	81.4

=== The Hume ===
1882 New South Wales colonial election: The Hume Wednesday 13 December
Candidate	Votes	%
William Lyne (re-elected)	unopposed	
Leyser Levin (re-elected)	unopposed	

=== The Hunter ===
1882 New South Wales colonial election: The Hunter Monday 4 December
Candidate	Votes	%
John Burns (re-elected)	518	75.3
William Richardson	170	24.7
Total formal votes	688	97.3
Informal votes	19	2.7
Turnout	707	55.5

=== Illawarra ===
1882 New South Wales colonial election: Illawarra Saturday 9 December
Candidate	Votes	%
Alexander Stuart (re-elected)	785	71.1
James Watson	319	28.9
Total formal votes	1,104	98.0
Informal votes	23	2.0
Turnout	1,128	65.9

James Watson had been unsuccessful in retaining his seat in Young.

=== Inverell ===
1882 New South Wales colonial election: Inverell Saturday 9 December
Candidate	Votes	%
Richard Murray (re-elected)	566	57.3
Thomas Mayne	352	35.6
Thomas Jones	70	7.1
Total formal votes	988	97.2
Informal votes	29	2.9
Turnout	1,017	57.2

=== Kiama ===
1882 New South Wales colonial election: Kiama Monday 11 December
Candidate	Votes	%
Harman Tarrant (re-elected)	545	59.4
John Davies	372	40.6
Total formal votes	917	98.7
Informal votes	12	1.3
Turnout	929	67.4

=== The Macleay ===
1882 New South Wales colonial election: The Macleay Friday 8 December
Candidate	Votes	%
Robert Smith (re-elected)	685	65.5
Enoch Rudder	361	34.5
Total formal votes	1,046	98.5
Informal votes	16	1.5
Turnout	1,062	56.1

=== Molong ===
1882 New South Wales colonial election: Molong Tuesday 12 December
Candidate	Votes	%
Andrew Ross (re-elected)	656	75.8
Willoughby Andrew	210	24.3
Total formal votes	866	98.1
Informal votes	17	1.9
Turnout	883	47.5

=== Monaro ===
1882 New South Wales colonial election: Monaro Thursday 14 December
Candidate	Votes	%
Henry Badgery (re-elected 1)	976	37.6
Robert Tooth (re-elected 2)	856	33.0
John Toohey	761	29.4
Total formal votes	2,593	98.9
Informal votes	29	1.1
Turnout	1,687	61.7

=== Morpeth ===
1882 New South Wales colonial election: Morpeth Wednesday 13 December
Candidate	Votes	%
Robert Wisdom (re-elected)	554	62.9
Archibald Jacob (defeated)	327	37.1
Total formal votes	881	97.5
Informal votes	23	2.5
Turnout	904	77.8

Archibald Jacob was the sitting member for Gloucester.

=== Mudgee ===
1882 New South Wales colonial election: Mudgee Monday 11 December
Candidate	Votes	%
Adolphus Taylor (elected 1)	1,976	32.3
John Robertson (re-elected 2)	1,256	20.5
David Buchanan (re-elected 3)	1,154	18.8
Thomas Browne	1,104	18.0
George Davidson	637	10.4
Total formal votes	6,127	99.7
Informal votes	21	0.3
Turnout	2,445	49.1

A sitting member Louis Beyers did not contest the election.

=== The Murray ===
1882 New South Wales colonial election: The Murray Saturday 16 December
Candidate	Votes	%
Robert Barbour (elected 1)	879	31.2
Alexander Wilson (re-elected 2)	832	29.5
Thomas Hanson	633	22.5
Edward Killen	474	16.8
Total formal votes	2,818	98.6
Informal votes	40	1.4
Turnout	1,745	59.3

A sitting member William Hay did not contest the election.

=== The Murrumbidgee ===
1882 New South Wales colonial election: The Murrumbidgee Monday 18 December
Candidate	Votes	%
Auber Jones (elected 1)	1,405	40.5
George Loughnan (re-elected 2)	1,154	33.3
James Douglas (defeated)	907	26.2
Total formal votes	3,466	98.7
Informal votes	47	1.3
Turnout	2,679	54.9

=== The Namoi ===
1882 New South Wales colonial election: The Namoi Thursday 7 December
Candidate	Votes	%
Thomas Dangar (re-elected)	532	71.9
R H Hyman	208	28.1
Total formal votes	740	96.2
Informal votes	29	3.8
Turnout	769	38.7

=== The Nepean ===
1882 New South Wales colonial election: The Nepean Tuesday 5 December
Candidate	Votes	%
Thomas Smith (re-elected)	804	78.4
Joseph Single	221	21.6
Total formal votes	1,025	98.6
Informal votes	15	1.4
Turnout	1,040	70.6

=== New England ===
1882 New South Wales colonial election: New England Saturday 16 December
Candidate	Votes	%
William Proctor (re-elected 1)	980	33.8
James Farnell (elected 2)	968	33.4
Jeremiah O'Connell	951	32.8
Total formal votes	2,899	99.2
Informal votes	24	0.8
Turnout	1,931	49.2

The sitting member Henry Copeland successfully contested Newtown. James Farnell was a sitting member for St Leonards and had already unsuccessfully contested Parramatta.

=== Newcastle ===
1882 New South Wales colonial election: Newcastle Thursday 30 November
Candidate	Votes	%
James Fletcher (re-elected 1)	2,121	45.7
James Ellis (elected 2)	1,527	32.9
George Lloyd (defeated)	990	21.4
Total formal votes	4,638	99.4
Informal votes	30	0.6
Turnout	4,668	70.9

=== Newtown ===
1882 New South Wales colonial election: Newtown Saturday 2 December
Candidate	Votes	%
Frederick Gibbes (elected 1)	1,209	29.4
Henry Copeland (re-elected 2)	976	23.7
William Foster (defeated)	966	23.5
Joseph Mitchell (defeated)	960	23.4
Total formal votes	4,111	99.5
Informal votes	20	0.5
Turnout	2,429	63.7

Henry Copeland was the member for New England to challenge William Foster, the Minister for Justice. Joseph Mitchell subsequently contested Canterbury but was again unsuccessful.

=== Northumberland ===
1882 New South Wales colonial election: Northumberland Saturday 9 December
Candidate	Votes	%
Ninian Melville (re-elected 1)	1,897	43.0
Atkinson Tighe (elected 2)	1,312	29.8
William Christie	1,200	27.2
Total formal votes	4,409	99.5
Informal votes	21	0.5
Turnout	2,530	71.0

The other sitting member Thomas Hungerford unsuccessfully contested Upper Hunter.

=== Orange ===
1882 New South Wales colonial election: Orange Wednesday 6 December
Candidate	Votes	%
Thomas Dalton (elected 1)	997	37.6
William Clarke (re-elected 2)	881	33.2
James Torpy	668	25.2
Total formal votes	105	100.0
Informal votes	2,651	0.0
Turnout	2,683	50.2

The other sitting member Andrew Kerr did not contest the election.

=== Paddington ===
1882 New South Wales colonial election: Paddington Saturday 2 December
Candidate	Votes	%
William Trickett (re-elected 1)	1,602	36.6
Robert Butcher (elected 2)	1,061	24.2
John Neild	616	14.1
Ebenezer Vickery	573	13.1
William Allen	531	12.1
Total formal votes	4,383	97.3
Informal votes	120	2.7
Turnout	2,768	60.9

The other sitting member William Hezlet did not contest the election.

=== Parramatta ===
1882 New South Wales colonial election: Parramatta Saturday 2 December
Candidate	Votes	%
Hugh Taylor (elected)	595	51.5
James Farnell (defeated)	364	31.5
Cyrus Fuller	196	17.0
Total formal votes	1,155	97.2
Informal votes	33	2.8
Turnout	1,189	77.3

The sitting member Charles Byrnes did not contest the election. James Farnell was a sitting member for St Leonards and went on to successfully contest New England.

=== Patrick's Plains ===
1882 New South Wales colonial election: Patrick's Plains Thursday 7 December
Candidate	Votes	%
Albert Gould (elected)	393	38.4
William Browne	359	35.1
James Hutchinson	230	22.5
John Elliott	41	4.0
Total formal votes	1,023	97.8
Informal votes	23	2.2
Turnout	1,046	67.0

The sitting member John Brown did not contest the election.

=== Queanbeyan ===
1882 New South Wales colonial election: Queanbeyan Monday 4 December
Candidate	Votes	%
George De Salis (elected)	353	43.6
Percy Hodgkinson	244	30.2
John Wright	212	26.2
Total formal votes	809	98.3
Informal votes	14	1.7
Turnout	823	49.0

The sitting member Thomas Rutledge did not contest the election.

=== Redfern ===
1882 New South Wales colonial election: Redfern Monday 4 December
Candidate	Votes	%
Francis Wright (re-elected 1)	2,209	28.2
Alfred Fremlin (re-elected 2)	2,075	26.5
John Sutherland (elected 3)	1,992	25.4
Thomas Williamson	1,555	19.9
Total formal votes	7,831	99.6
Informal votes	34	0.4
Turnout	3,533	59.4
	(1 new seat)	

=== The Richmond ===
1882 New South Wales colonial election: The Richmond Saturday 9 December
Candidate	Votes	%
Samuel Gray (elected)	1,046	60.4
Patrick Hogan	686	39.6
Total formal votes	1,732	97.4
Informal votes	47	2.6
Turnout	1,779	60.8

The sitting member Charles Fawcett did not contest the election.

=== Shoalhaven ===
1882 New South Wales colonial election: Shoalhaven Thursday 7 December
Candidate	Votes	%
Frederick Humphery (elected)	790	52.4
John Roseby (defeated)	719	47.7
Total formal votes	1,509	98.6
Informal votes	21	1.4
Turnout	1,530	78.8

=== South Sydney ===
1882 New South Wales colonial election: South Sydney Saturday 2 December
Candidate	Votes	%
Joseph Olliffe (elected 1)	2,672	21.7
John Harris (elected 2)	2,669	21.7
William Poole (re-elected 3)	1,948	15.8
George Withers (re-elected 4)	1,569	12.8
Sydney Burdekin (defeated)	1,412	11.5
John Davies (defeated)	1,345	10.9
George Carter (defeated)	682	5.6
Total formal votes	12,297	98.5
Informal votes	191	1.5
Turnout	4,714	59.6

Sydney Burdekin was a sitting member for Tamworth.

=== St Leonards ===
1882 New South Wales colonial election: St Leonards Tuesday 5 December
Candidate	Votes	%
Bernhardt Holtermann (elected 1)	965	30.9
George Dibbs (elected 2)	962	30.8
Cunningham Atchison	713	22.8
Philip Richardson	327	10.5
William Muston	86	2.8
Sir Henry Parkes	70	2.2
Total formal votes	3,123	98.5
Informal votes	49	1.5
Turnout	1,926	62.5
	(1 new seat)	

Sitting member James Farnell unsuccessfully contested Parramatta and subsequently successfully contested New England. After Sir Henry Parkes unsuccessfully contested East Sydney and nominated for both St Leonards and then Tenterfield where he was elected unopposed. Parkes then withdrew from St Leonards.

=== Tamworth ===
1882 New South Wales colonial election: Tamworth Wednesday 13 December
Candidate	Votes	%
Robert Levien (re-elected 1)	1,021	44.2
John Gill (elected 2)	699	30.3
Michael Burke	591	25.6
Total formal votes	2,311	99.1
Informal votes	21	0.9
Turnout	1,387	46.0

The other sitting member Sydney Burdekin unsuccessfully contested South Sydney.

=== Tenterfield ===
1882 New South Wales colonial election: Tenterfield Friday 8 December
Candidate	Votes	%
Sir Henry Parkes (elected)	unopposed	

The sitting member Augustus Fraser did not contest the election. Sir Henry Parkes unsuccessfully contested East Sydney and nominated for both St Leonards and then Tenterfield. Parkes then withdrew from St Leonards.

=== Tumut ===
1882 New South Wales colonial election: Tumut Saturday 9 December
Candidate	Votes	%
Thomas O'Mara (re-elected)	602	53.8
Arthur Renwick	517	46.2
Total formal votes	1,119	98.6
Informal votes	16	1.4
Turnout	1,135	61.2

Arthur Renwick had previously unsuccessfully contested East Sydney.

=== The Upper Hunter ===
1882 New South Wales colonial election: The Upper Hunter Thursday 14 December
Candidate	Votes	%
John McElhone (re-elected 1)	1,016	36.4
John McLaughlin (re-elected 2)	941	33.7
James Wilshire	496	17.8
Thomas Hungerford (defeated)	337	12.1
Total formal votes	2,790	99.5
Informal votes	15	0.5
Turnout	1,667	62.5

John McElhone had already been elected for East Sydney. Thomas Hungerford was a sitting member for Northumberland.

=== Wellington ===
1882 New South Wales colonial election: Wellington Monday 11 December
Candidate	Votes	%
David Ferguson (elected)	518	78.5
William Shorter	142	21.5
Total formal votes	660	96.5
Informal votes	24	3.5
Turnout	684	53.9

The sitting member Edmund Barton successfully contested East Sydney.

=== Wentworth ===
1882 New South Wales colonial election: Wentworth Monday 18 December
Candidate	Votes	%
Edward Quin (re-elected)	511	50.1
Evan Evans	509	49.9
Total formal votes	1,020	97.7
Informal votes	24	2.3
Turnout	1,044	35.1

=== West Macquarie ===
1882 New South Wales colonial election: West Macquarie Wednesday 13 December
Candidate	Votes	%
Thomas Hellyer (elected)	unopposed	

The sitting member Charles Pilcher unsuccessfully contested West Sydney.

=== West Maitland ===
1882 New South Wales colonial election: West Maitland Thursday 7 December
Candidate	Votes	%
Henry Cohen (elected)	564	59.8
Richard Thompson	380	40.3
Total formal votes	944	99.1
Informal votes	9	0.9
Turnout	953	78.5

The sitting member James Fulford did not contest the election.

=== West Sydney ===
1882 New South Wales colonial election: West Sydney Tuesday 5 December
Candidate	Votes	%
Daniel O'Connor (re-elected 1)	2,967	20.7
George Merriman (elected 2)	2,519	17.5
Francis Abigail (re-elected 3)	2,340	16.3
Angus Cameron (re-elected 4)	2,176	15.2
William Martin (defeated)	2,070	14.4
Edward O'Sullivan	1,627	11.3
Charles Pilcher (defeated)	362	2.5
Jeremiah Murphy	306	2.1
Total formal votes	14,367	98.9
Informal votes	166	1.1
Turnout	5,416	58.1

=== Wollombi ===
1882 New South Wales colonial election: Wollombi Tuesday 12 December
Candidate	Votes	%
Joseph Gorrick (elected)	437	53.0
Joseph Eckford (defeated)	388	47.0
Total formal votes	825	97.9
Informal votes	18	2.1
Turnout	843	62.6

=== Yass Plains ===
1882 New South Wales colonial election: Yass Plains Wednesday 6 December
Candidate	Votes	%
Louis Heydon (re-elected)	669	60.2
Henry Dodds	442	39.8
Total formal votes	1,111	96.6
Informal votes	39	3.4
Turnout	1,150	57.4

=== Young ===
1882 New South Wales colonial election: Young Monday 4 December
Candidate	Votes	%
Gerald Spring (elected 1)	1,097	40.7
James Mackinnon (elected 2)	799	29.7
James Watson (defeated)	797	29.6
Total formal votes	2,693	98.2
Informal votes	50	1.8
Turnout	2,743	39.7

The other sitting member William Watson did not contest the election. James Watson was subsequently unsuccessful in contesting Illawarra.

== See also ==
- Candidates of the 1882 New South Wales colonial election
- Members of the New South Wales Legislative Assembly, 1882–1885
