= 1884 Carcoar colonial by-election =

By-election in New South Wales, Australia

A by-election was held for the New South Wales Legislative Assembly electorate of Carcoar on 21 November 1884 because of the death of Andrew Lynch.

== Dates ==
Date	Event
2 November 1884	Andrew Lynch died.
8 November 1884	Writ of election issued by the Speaker of the Legislative Assembly.
17 November 1884	Nominations
21 November 1884	Polling day
28 November 1884	Return of writ

== Candidates ==
- Ezekiel Baker had been the member for Carcoar from 1880 until 1881 and was Secretary for Mines when he was expelled from the Assembly on allegations of bribery and corruption in relation to the affairs of the Milburn Creek Copper Mining Co. Ltd. He was defeated at the subsequent by-election in December 1881. Charges against him were subsequently dropped and Baker petitioned parliament to rescind its censure of him, which was agreed in May 1884.
- Thomas Fitzpatrick was a squatter from Junee, who was an unsuccessful candidate at the 1882 election.
- Charles Garland was an assurance agent and miner, who had interests in mines in Leadville and on the Palmer River in Far North Queensland. He was also the proprietor of the Carcoar Chronicle, and Baker accused Garland of vilifying him in that paper in relation to the Milburn Creek case.

Fitzpatrick won the show of hands however a poll was demanded.

== Result ==
1884 Carcoar by-election Friday 21 November
Candidate	Votes	%
Ezekiel Baker (elected)	715	45.9
Thomas Fitzpatrick	426	27.3
Charles Garland	417	26.7
Total formal votes	1,558	100.0
Informal votes	0	0.0
Turnout	1,558	50.2

== See also ==
- Electoral results for the district of Carcoar
- List of New South Wales state by-elections
