= Members of the New South Wales Legislative Assembly, 1882–1885 =

Members of the New South Wales Legislative Assembly who served in the 11th parliament of New South Wales held their seats from 1882 to 1885. Elections for the eleventh Legislative Assembly were held between 30 November and 21 December 1882 with parliament first meeting on 3 January 1883. The Assembly was expanded to 113 members elected in 40 single member electorates, 26 two member electorates, 3 three member electorate and 3 four member electorates. The parliament had a maximum term of 3 years and was dissolved on 7 October 1885 after 33 months. The Premiers during this parliament were Sir Alexander Stuart until 7 October 1885 and then George Dibbs. The Speaker was Edmund Barton.

Name	Electorate	Years in office
Joseph Abbott	Gunnedah	1880–1901
Francis Abigail	West Sydney	1880–1891
George Allen (Note: Glebe MLA George Allen resigned in August 1883 to take a voyage to England. The resulting by-election was won by Michael Chapman on 26 August 1883.)	Glebe	1869–1883
Henry Badgery	Monaro	1878–1885
Ezekiel Baker (Note: Carcoar MLA Andrew Lynch died on 2 November 1884. The resulting by-election on 21 November 1884 was won by Ezekiel Baker .)	Carcoar	1870-1877 1879-1881 1884-1887
Robert Barbour	Murray	1877-1880 1882-1894
Edmund Barton	East Sydney	1879–1887, 1891–1894, 1898–1900
Russell Barton	Bourke	1880–1886
Herbert Brown	Durham	1875–1898
James Brunker	East Maitland	1880–1904
David Buchanan	Mudgee	1860–1862, 1864–1867, 1869–1877, 1879–1885, 1888–1889
Sydney Burdekin (Note: East Sydney MLA George Reid was declared to have a position of profit under the crown in January 1884. The resulting by-election on 29 February 1884 was won by Sydney Burdekin.)	East Sydney	1880-1882 1884-1891 1892-1894
John Burns	Hunter	1861–1869, 1872–1891
Robert Butcher	Paddington	1882–1887
Angus Cameron	West Sydney	1874–1889 1894-1896
George Campbell	Carcoar	1881–1885
William Campbell	Gwydir	1868–1869 1880-1886
George Cass	Bogan	1880–1892
Michael Chapman	Glebe	1883–1885 1887-1891
Henry Clarke	Eden	1869–1894, 1895–1904
William Clarke	Orange	1880–1889
Henry Cohen	West Maitland	1874 - 1880 1882-1885
Edward Combes	East Macquarie	1872-1874 1877-1885
Walter Coonan	Forbes	1877-1880 1882-1887
Henry Copeland (Note: Newtown MLA Henry Copeland was required to resign and contest a ministerial by-election after being appointed Secretary for Public Works in January 1883. The resulting by-election on 13 January 1883 was won by Joseph Mitchell.) (Note: East Sydney MLA John McElhone was elected to two seats, East Sydney and Upper Hunter. He resigned the seat of East Sydney and represented Upper Hunter. The resulting by-election on 23 January 1883 was won by Henry Copeland.)	Newtown East Sydney	1877–1883, 1883–1895, 1895–1900
John Cramsie	Balranald	1880–1887
Thomas Dalton	Orange	1882–1891
Thomas Dangar	Namoi	1865–1885, 1887–1890
George Day	Albury	1874–1889
George De Salis	Queanbeyan	1882–1885
George Dibbs	St Leonards	1874–1877, 1882–1895
James Ellis	Newcastle	1882–1885 1887-1889 1894-1895
James Farnell	New England	1860–1860, 1864–1885, 1887–1888
David Ferguson	Wellington	1882–1891
William Fergusson	Glen Innes	1880–1887
James Fletcher	Newcastle	1880–1891
Alfred Fremlin	Redfern	1880–1885
John Gannon (Note: Argyle MLA John Gannon resigned in March 1885 due to ill health. The resulting by-election on 31 March 1885 was won by Sir Henry Parkes.)	Argyle	1881–1885
Jacob Garrard	Balmain	1880–1898
Thomas Garrett	Camden	1860–1871, 1872–1891
James Garvan	Eden	1880–1894
Frederick Gibbes	Newtown	1882–1888
John Gill	Tamworth	1882–1885
Joseph Gorrick	Wollombi	1882–1885
Albert Gould	Patrick's Plains	1882–1898
Samuel Gray	Richmond	1859-1864 1874-1880 1882-1885
George Griffiths	East Sydney	1882–1885
Mark Hammond (Note: Canterbury MLA William Pigott resigned in April 1884 due to his private work commitments. The resulting by-election was won by Mark Hammond on 19 April 1884.)	Canterbury	1884–1887
John Harris	South Sydney	1877-1880 1882-1885
Thomas Hellyer (Note: West Macquarie MLA Thomas Hellyer resigned in June 1884. The resulting by-election was won by Lewis Lloyd on 2 July 1884.)	West Macquarie	1882–1884
William Henson (Note: Canterbury MLA Henry Moses was elevated to the Legislative Council in August 1885. The resulting by-election on 16 September 1885 was won by William Henson.)	Canterbury	1880-1882 1885-1889
Louis Heydon	Yass Plains	1882–1886
William Holborow	Argyle	1880–1894
Bernhardt Holtermann (Note: St Leonards MLA Bernhardt Holtermann died on 29 April 1885. The resulting by-election on 4 June 1885 was won by Isaac Ives.)	St Leonards	1882–1885
Frederick Humphery	Shoalhaven	1882–1887
William Hutchinson	Balmain	1882–1885
Isaac Ives	St Leonards	1885–1889
Sir Patrick Jennings	Bogan	1869–1872 1880-1887
Auber Jones	Murrumbidgee	1882–1885
John Lackey (Note: Central Cumberland MLA John Lackey was elevated to the Legislative Council in August 1885. The resulting by-election on 24 September 1885 was won by Varney Parkes.)	Central Cumberland	1860–1864, 1867–1885
Charles Lee (Note: Tenterfield MLA Sir Henry Parkes resigned in November 1884 claiming that he was retiring from politics. The resulting by-election on 24 November 1884 was won by Charles Lee.)	Tenterfield	1884–1920
Leyser Levin	Hume	1880–1885
Robert Levien	Tamworth	1880–1889, 1889–1913
Lewis Lloyd	West Macquarie	1882–1884
George Loughnan	Murrumbidgee	1880–1885
Richard Luscombe (Note: Northumberland MLA Atkinson Tighe resigned in May 1884. The resulting by-election on 26 May 1884 was won by Richard Luscombe.)	Northumberland	1884–1885
Andrew Lynch	Carcoar	1876–1884
William Lyne	Hume	1880–1901
Richard Machattie	Bourke	1882–1885
James Mackinnon	Young	1882–1894
William McCourt	Camden	1882–1885 1887-1913
Andrew McCulloch	Central Cumberland	1877–1888
John McElhone (Note: Mudgee MLA Adolphus Taylor, notorious for his disruption of Assembly proceedings, made an inflammatory speech in February 1883 in which he was challenged by Upper Hunter MLA John McElhone to resign and both would contest Taylor's seat of Mudgee. The challenge was accepted and both resigned. Taylor received 67% of the votes, defeating McElhone in the Mudgee by-election on 6 March 1883. McElhone had also been nominated for the Upper Hunter by-election, held on the same day, which saw him returned to his seat.)	East Sydney Upper Hunter	1875-1889 1895-1898
John McLaughlin	Upper Hunter	1880–1885 1895-1901
Henry McQuade	Hawkesbury	1880 1882-1885
Ninian Melville	Northumberland	1880–1887 1889-1894
George Merriman	West Sydney	1882–1885 1887-1889
Joseph Mitchell	Newtown	1881–1885 1888-1891
Henry Moses	Canterbury	1869–1880 1882-1885
Richard Murray	Inverell	1880–1885
Daniel O'Connor	West Sydney	1877-1891 1900-1904
Joseph Olliffe	South Sydney	1882–1885
Thomas O'Mara	Tumut	1882–1885, 1887–1889
Sir Henry Parkes	Tenterfield Argyle	1856, 1858, 1859–1861, 1864–1870, 1872–1895
Varney Parkes	Central Cumberland	1885–1888, 1891–1913
William Pigott	Canterbury	1880–1884
William Poole	South Sydney	1880–1885
William Proctor	New England	1880–1887
John Purves	Clarence	1880–1887
Edward Quin	Wentworth	1882–1887
George Reid	East Sydney	1880–1884 1885-1901
Charles Roberts	Hastings and Manning	1882–1890
Sir John Robertson	Mudgee	1856–1861, 1862–1865, 1865–1866, 1866–1870, 1870–1877, 1877–1878, 1882–1886
Andrew Ross	Molong	1880–1904
Alexander Ryrie	Braidwood	1880–1891
David Ryrie (Note: Monaro MLA Robert Tooth resigned in July 1884. The resulting by-election on 24 July 1884 was won by David Ryrie.)	Monaro	1884–1885
John See	Grafton	1880–1904
Thomas Slattery	Boorowa	1880–1885 1887-1895
Bruce Smith (Note: Gundagai MLA Bruce Smith resigned in April 1884. The resulting by-election on 22 April 1884 was won by James Watson.)	Gundagai	1882–1884, 1889–1894
Robert Smith	Macleay	1870–1889
Sydney Smith	East Macquarie	1882–1898 1900
Thomas Smith	Nepean	1877-1887 1895-1904
Gerald Spring	Young	1869–1872 1882-1887
Septimus Stephen	Canterbury	1882–1887
Alfred Stokes	Forbes	1882–1891
Sir Alexander Stuart	Illawarra	1874–1885
Francis Suttor (Note: Bathurst MLA Francis Suttor was declared to have a position of profit under the crown in January 1884. Having resolved this he was unopposed at the resulting by-election on 11 February 1884.)	Bathurst	1875–1890
John Sutherland	Redfern	1860–1881, 1882–1889
Walter Targett	Hartley	1882–1887
Harman Tarrant	Kiama	1880–1887
Adolphus Taylor	Mudgee	1882–1887 1890-1891
Hugh Taylor	Parramatta	1882–1894
William Teece	Goulburn	1872–1890
Atkinson Tighe	Northumberland	1862–1869, 1882–1884
Robert Tooth	Monaro	1880–1884
William Trickett	Paddington	1880–1885 1887
Robert Vaughn	Grenfell	1880–1894
James Watson	Gundagai	1869–1882, 1884–1885
Robert White	Gloucester	1882–1887
Robert Wilkinson	Balranald	1880–1894
Alexander Wilson	Murray	1880-1885 1887-1889
Robert Wisdom	Morpeth	1859–1872, 1874–1887
George Withers	South Sydney	1880–1885 1887-1889
Francis Wright	Redfern	1882–1885, 1889–1903
James Young	Hastings and Manning	1880–1901 1904-1907

== See also ==
- Stuart ministry
- First Dibbs ministry
- Results of the 1882 New South Wales colonial election
- Candidates of the 1882 New South Wales colonial election

== Notes ==
There was no party system in New South Wales politics until 1887. Under the constitution, ministers were required to resign to recontest their seats in a by-election when appointed. These by-elections are only noted when the minister was defeated; in general, he was elected unopposed.
