= 1862 Carcoar colonial by-election =

By-election in New South Wales, Australia

A by-election was held for the New South Wales Legislative Assembly electorate of Carcoar on 16 October 1862 because William Watt resigned.

== Dates ==
Date	Event
27 September 1862	William Watt resigned.
3 October 1862	Writ of election issued by the Speaker of the Legislative Assembly.
16 October 1862	Nominations
20 October 1862	Polling day
28 October 1862	Return of writ

== Result ==
1862 Carcoar by-election Thursday 16 October
Candidate	Votes	%
William Dalley (elected)	unopposed	

== See also ==
- Electoral results for the district of Carcoar
- List of New South Wales state by-elections
