= Candidates of the 1882 New South Wales colonial election =

This is a list of candidates for the 1882 New South Wales colonial election. The election was held from 30 November to 21 December 1882.

There was no recognisable party structure at this election.

== Retiring Members ==
- Robert Abbott MLA (Hartley)
- Joseph Andrews MLA (Hastings and Manning)
- Louis Beyers MLA (Mudgee)
- John Bodel MLA (Forbes)
- John Brown MLA (Patrick's Plains)
- Charles Byrnes MLA (Parramatta)
- Henry Dangar MLA (East Sydney)
- Charles Fawcett MLA (Richmond)
- Augustus Fraser MLA (Tenterfield)
- James Fulford MLA (West Maitland)
- William Hay MLA (Murray)
- William Hezlet MLA (Paddington)
- Andrew Kerr MLA (Orange)
- Thomas Rutledge MLA (Queanbeyan)
- William Watson MLA (Young)

== Legislative Assembly ==
Sitting members are shown in bold text. Successful candidates are highlighted.

Electorates are arranged chronologically from the day the poll was held. Because of the sequence of polling, some sitting members who were defeated in their constituencies were then able to contest other constituencies later in the polling period. On the second occasion, these members are shown in italic text.

Electorate	Successful candidates	Unsuccessful candidates
Thursday 30 November 1882
East Sydney	**Edmund Barton**; George Griffiths; **John McElhone**; **George Reid**	James Green; **Sir Henry Parkes**; **Arthur Renwick**
Newcastle	James Ellis; **James Fletcher**	**George Lloyd**
Friday 1 December 1882
Glebe	**George Allen**	Michael Fitzpatrick
Goulburn	**William Teece**	
Saturday 2 December 1882
Balmain	**Jacob Garrard**; William Hutchinson	William Pritchard; John Taylor
Bathurst	**Francis Suttor**	Thomas Hellyer
Camden	**Thomas Garrett**; William McCourt	**John Kidd**
Newtown	**Henry Copeland**; Frederick Gibbes	**William Foster**; **Joseph Mitchell**
Paddington	Robert Butcher; **William Trickett**	William Allen; John Neild; Ebenezer Vickery
Parramatta	Hugh Taylor	**James Farnell**; Cyrus Fuller
South Sydney	John Harris; Joseph Olliffe; **William Poole**; **George Withers**	**Sydney Burdekin**; **George Carter**; **John Davies**
Monday 4 December 1882
Albury	**George Day**	Luke Gulson; James Hayes
Hunter	**John Burns**	William Richardson
Queanbeyan	George De Salis	Percy Hodgkinson; John Wright
Redfern	**Alfred Fremlin**; John Sutherland; **Francis Wright**	Thomas Williamson
Young	James Mackinnon; Gerald Spring	**James Watson**
Tuesday 5 December 1882
Central Cumberland	**John Lackey**; **Andrew McCulloch**	Nathaniel Bull
Nepean	**Thomas Smith**	Joseph Single
St Leonards	George Dibbs; Bernhardt Holtermann	Cunningham Atchison; William Muston; Sir Henry Parkes; Philip Richardson
West Sydney	**Francis Abigail**; **Angus Cameron**; George Merriman; **Daniel O'Connor**	**William Martin**; Jeremiah Murphy; Edward O'Sullivan; **Charles Pilcher**
Wednesday 6 December 1882
Carcoar	**George Campbell**; **Andrew Lynch**	Thomas Fitzpatrick
East Maitland	**James Brunker**	
Orange	**William Clarke**; Thomas Dalton	Benjamin Nelson; James Torpy
Yass Plains	**Louis Heydon**	Henry Dodds
Thursday 7 December 1882
East Macquarie	**Edward Combes**; **Sydney Smith**	
Namoi	**Thomas Dangar**	R H Hyman
Patrick's Plains	Albert Gould	William Browne; John Elliott; James Hutchinson
Shoalhaven	Frederick Humphery	**John Roseby**
West Maitland	Henry Cohen	Richard Thompson
Friday 8 December 1882
Forbes	Walter Coonan; Alfred Stokes	**Henry Cooke**
Grenfell	**Robert Vaughn**	E B Whelan
Macleay	**Robert Smith**	Enoch Rudder
Tenterfield	Sir Henry Parkes	
Saturday 9 December 1882
Braidwood	**Alexander Ryrie**	
Canterbury	Henry Moses; **William Pigott**; Septimus Stephen	William Archer; Mark Hammond; **William Henson**; Joseph Mitchell
Durham	**Herbert Brown**	
Grafton	**John See**	
Illawarra	**Alexander Stuart**	James Watson
Inverell	**Richard Murray**	Thomas Jones; Thomas Mayne
Northumberland	**Ninian Melville**; Atkinson Tighe	William Christie
Richmond	Samuel Gray	Patrick Hogan
Tumut	**Thomas O'Mara**	Arthur Renwick
Monday 11 December 1882
Argyle	**John Gannon**; **William Holborow**	George Ranken
Eden	**Henry Clarke**; **James Garvan**	
Hawkesbury	Henry McQuade	**Alexander Bowman**
Kiama	**Harman Tarrant**	John Davies
Mudgee	**David Buchanan**; **Sir John Robertson**; Adolphus Taylor	Thomas Browne; George Davidson
Wellington	David Ferguson	William Shorter
Tuesday 12 December 1882
Clarence	**John Purves**	Richard Stevenson
Hastings and Manning	Charles Roberts; **James Young**	Daniel Macquarie
Molong	**Andrew Ross**	Willoughby Andrew
Wollombi	Joseph Gorrick	**Joseph Eckford**
Wednesday 13 December 1882
Boorowa	**Thomas Slattery**	
Gundagai	**Bruce Smith**	Frederick Pinkstone
Gwydir	**William Campbell**	Thomas Hassall
Hume	**Leyser Levin**; **William Lyne**	
Morpeth	**Robert Wisdom**	**Archibald Jacob**
Tamworth	John Gill; **Robert Levien**	Michael Burke
West Macquarie	Thomas Hellyer	
Thursday 14 December 1882
Hartley	Walter Targett	John Hughes; George Lloyd; Charles Passmore; John Shepherd
Monaro	**Henry Badgery**; **Robert Tooth**	John Toohey
Upper Hunter	**John McElhone**; **John McLaughlin**	**Thomas Hungerford**; James Wilshire
Saturday 16 December 1882
Murray	Robert Barbour; **Alexander Wilson**	Thomas Hanson; Edward Killen
New England	James Farnell; **William Proctor**	Jeremiah O'Connell
Monday 18 December 1882
Murrumbidgee	Auber Jones; **George Loughnan**	**James Douglas**
Wentworth	**Edward Quin**	Evan Evans
Tuesday 19 December 1882
Bogan	**George Cass**; **Sir Patrick Jennings**	William Forlonge
Bourke	**Russell Barton**; Richard Machattie	Thomas Matthews
Wednesday 20 December 1882
Balranald	**John Cramsie**; **Robert Wilkinson**	
Glen Innes	**William Fergusson**	
Gunnedah	**Joseph Abbott**	William Douglass
Thursday 21 November 1882
Gloucester	Robert White	William Christie; Henry Hudson; William Johnston

== See also ==
- Members of the New South Wales Legislative Assembly, 1882–1885
