= 1876 Carcoar colonial by-election =

By-election in New South Wales, Australia

A by-election was held for the New South Wales Legislative Assembly electorate of Carcoar on 14 June 1876 because of the resignation of Solomon Meyer. His company TF Meyer and Co had become insolvent.

== Dates ==
Date	Event
25 May 1876	Solomon Meyer resigned.
26 May 1876	Writ of election issued by the Speaker of the Legislative Assembly.
14 June 1876	Nominations
21 June 1876	Polling day
30 June 1876	Return of writ

== Result ==
1876 Carcoar by-election Wednesday 14 June
Candidate	Votes	%
Andrew Lynch (elected)	unopposed	

== See also ==
- Electoral results for the district of Carcoar
- List of New South Wales state by-elections
