= 1881 Carcoar colonial by-election =

By-election in New South Wales, Australia

A by-election was held for the New South Wales Legislative Assembly electorate of Carcoar on 1 December 1881 because Ezekiel Baker was expelled from the Assembly on allegations of bribery and corruption.

== Dates ==
Date	Event
9 November 1881	Ezekiel Baker expelled from the Legislative Assembly.
10 November 1881	Writ of election issued by the Speaker of the Legislative Assembly.
24 November 1881	Nominations
1 December 1881	Polling day
13 December 1881	Return of writ

== Result ==
1881 Carcoar by-election Thursday 1 December
Candidate	Votes	%
George Campbell (elected)	846	58.1
Ezekiel Baker (defeated)	610	41.9
Total formal votes	1,456	96.4
Informal votes	55	3.6
Turnout	1,511	56.2

== See also ==
- Electoral results for the district of Carcoar
- List of New South Wales state by-elections
