= Denison Town, New South Wales =

Denison Town New South Wales
- Coordinates: 32°01′59″S 149°29′38″E
- Established: 1850s
- Elevation: 400 m (1,312 ft)
- Location: 11.1 km (7 mi) E of Dunedoo; 374 km (232 mi) NW of Sydney
- LGA(s): Warrumbungle Shire
- Region: Orana

Denison Town is a ghost town in New South Wales, Australia. It was established in the 1850s and is thought to have been named after the Governor of New South Wales, Sir William Thomas Denison. It was located about 11 kilometres (7 mi) from the present town of Dunedoo. In its heyday, Denison Town consisted of an inn, post office, church and cemetery, and was the occasional venue for sittings of the Local Court. Local industries included the farming of wheat, sheep and cattle, alongside sporadic prospecting for silver ore.

In 1861 the inn, named the Denison Hotel, was the scene of an attempted robbery by bushrangers who had carried out previous attacks around Mudgee. The innkeeper and patrons fought off the robbers, but the incident led to calls for a permanent police presence in the town.

Denison Town Post Office opened on 1 January 1860 and closed in 1893. Denison Town had a provisional or half-time school from 1876 until 1899, A request for a local school was rejected in 1906. Eventually the opening of silver-lead mines at nearby Leadville, as well as the absence of a railway, resulted in Denison Town becoming a ghost town. One building and the pioneer cemetery remained. Newspaper reports from the 1930s indicated that the cemetery, which contained around 50 graves, was neglected and used for grazing by local livestock. The cemetery still exists.
