= Leadville, New South Wales =

Leadville New South Wales
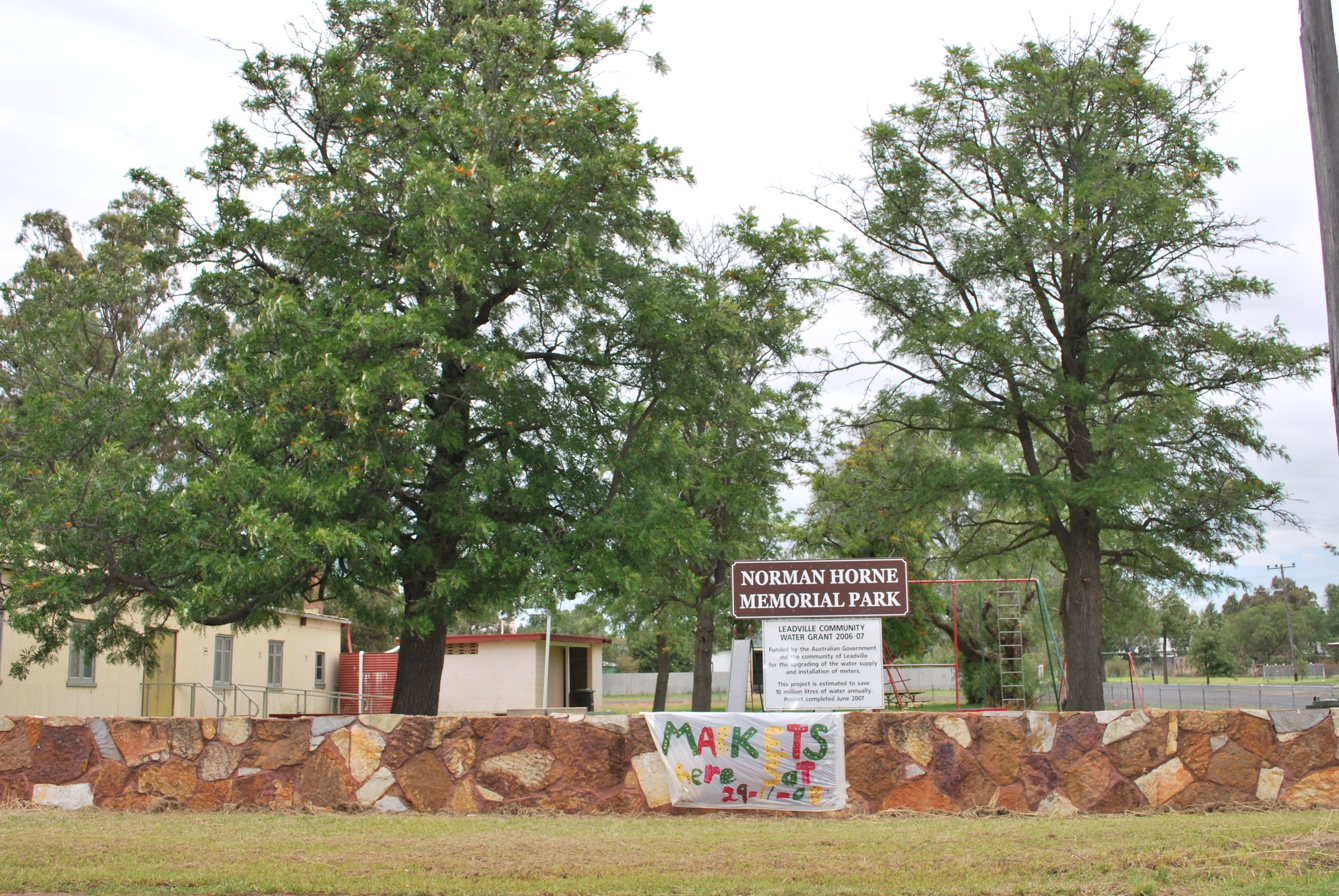
- Norman Horne Memorial Park

- Coordinates: 32°00′53.7″S 149°32′43.2″E
- Population: 169 (2016 census)
- Postcode(s): 2844
- Location: 376 km (234 mi) NW of Sydney; 107 km (66 mi) E of Dubbo; 17 km (11 mi) E of Dunedoo, New South Wales
- LGA(s): Warrumbungle Shire
- State electorate(s): Barwon
- Federal division(s): Parkes

Leadville is a town in New South Wales, Australia. The town is located in the Warrumbungle Shire local government area, 376 kilometres (234 mi) north west of the state capital, Sydney. At the 2016 census, Leadville and the surrounding area had a population of 169.

== History ==
=== Aboriginal history ===
The site of modern-day Leadville lies on the traditional lands of Wiradjuri people, close to the lands of neighbouring Kamilaroi people that lie to the north and east. Early government surveyors were directed to use local language words for place names whenever possible and place names of surrounding settlements such as Dunedoo, Coolah, Goolma, Gulgong and Mudgee are settler interpretations of Wiradjuri language words. That tends to confirm that it is Wiradjuri country.

=== Mining town ===
The origins of the town are associated with the nearby silver-lead ore deposits; the former Mount Stewart, Extended, Mount Scott, Grosvenor and Latimer Mines are nearby.

An Aboriginal man, Tommy Governor—the father of Jimmy Governor—found some interesting rocks, near what would become Mount Stewart, and showed these to Mr. George Stewart. The rocks were lead carbonate and assays showed the presence of silver. Governor was later to complain that he had not received what he thought was fair compensation for his discovery.

Mining commenced at Mount Stewart in 1888. For the first few years, the miners used nearby Denison Town for supplies and services.

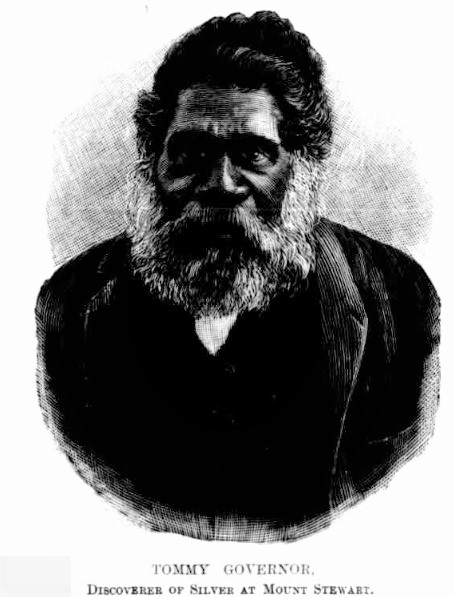
Tommy Governor, discoverer of the silver-lead deposit.

In 1891, Free Trader politician, gold-mining entrepreneur, and director of the Mount Stewart Lead and Silver Mining Company, Charles Lancelot Garland, retired as the member for Carcoar and bought 32 hectares (80 acres), at what is now Leadville, immediately to the east of the Mount Stewart mine site. He subdivided the land into 250 town allotments. The new 'private town' of Leadville took its name from another silver-lead mining town, Leadville, Colorado. Private ownership of the town was the reason that Leadville was a 'town', while nearby Dunedoo and Coolah were officially only 'villages'. The streets of the new town were named after directors of the Mount Stewart mine—Clarke, Garland, Cox, Channon, Stewart, Plumb—and others—Denham, Davis (a mine manager), and Robinson.The growth of Leadville caused Denison Town to fade away, as business migrated to the new town; One of those to move was storekeeper, William Latimer.

Mining at Leadville occurred in three distinct phases, 1888 to 1894, 1913 to 1935, and 1950 to 1952.

Beginning in 1888, silver and lead ore was mined. In 1889, the Mount Steward mine shaft had reached a depth of 78 metres (255 ft) and was driving east and west from the 76 metres (250 ft) level. In 1890, the Mount Stewart Mining Lead and Silver Mining Company was floated. For fourteen months, from early 1892, there was also a smelter at Leadville, which produced 1,539 tons of lead and 9,085 kilograms (292,093 ozt) of silver, from 15,000 tons of ore. The smelter had an 80-ton water jacket furnace (a cold-blast furnace), with 19 kilowatts (25 hp) steam-driven blast engine, and a 15 metres (50 ft) high brick chimney. The furnace used coke—brought from Newcastle to Mudgee by rail and then carted from there to Leadville, an expensive proposition—supplemented by locally burned charcoal. The fortunate accidental discovery of a deposit of limestone, within the mine itself, provided a local source of limestone for flux used in the furnace.

The initial success of the Mount Stewart Mine prompted others to explore and take up leases in the area. A second mine, the Mount Steward Extended Mine—just north of the original Mount Stewart Mine and close to its smelter—was sunk in 1892 and a company floated to fund it; Garland was also a director of this company. The Dynevor Silver and Gold Mining Co. was floated in Melbourne in 1891, and began to mine a deposit of sulphide ores approximately one kilometre/mile away from the Mount Stuart Mine. Storekeeper William Latimer's freehold paddock also became a mine. Three miles from Leadville, yet another company sank a shaft, the Mount Scott Mine, which seems never to have gone into production.

Mining activity peaked in 1893, and with it the town's population—growing from 26 in 1891 to around 1000—before the silver price crashed in a worldwide financial panic. By 1894, complicating the problem of the silver price, the carbonate ores at the Mount Stewart Mine were becoming exhausted, as miners reached the sulphide zone, consisting mainly of iron pyrites and zinc sulphide. Mining ceased around the end of 1894, and also effectively ended land sales in the town, leaving Garland with many unsold town allotments.

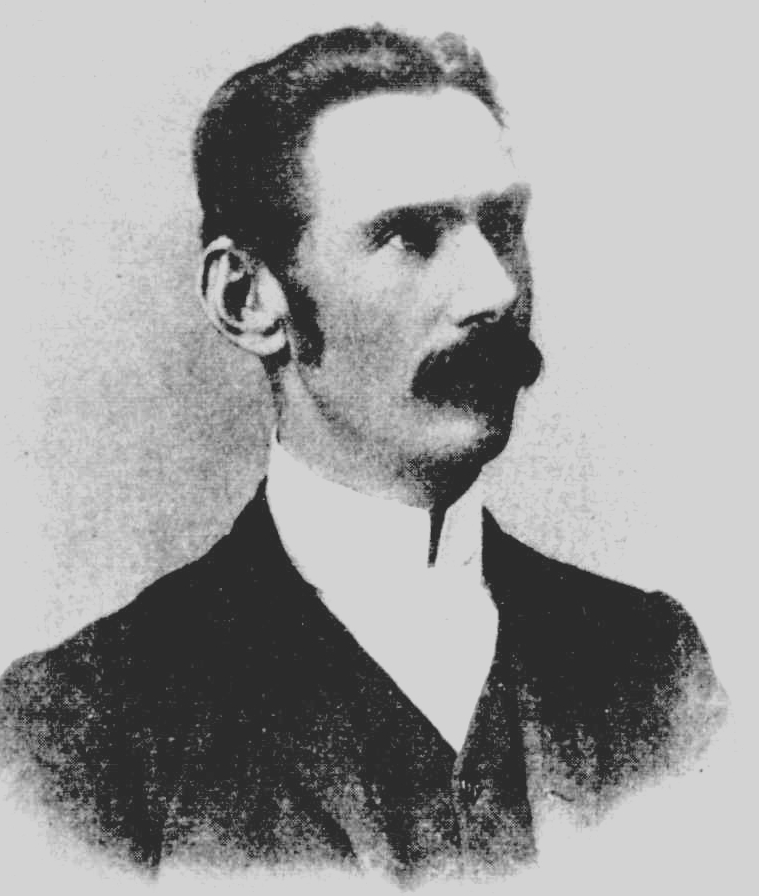
Charles Lancelot Garland, founder of Leadville, politician, and mining entrepreneur, c.1899.

After silver-lead mining ended, some ethnic-Chinese shearers and station hands settled in the town, which had been vacated by the miners. There was an ethnic-Chinese presence in the town for some years.

Charles Garland bought the Mount Stewart Mine from the liquidator in 1898 and was joined in the venture by James Channon, a Sydney manufacturer and mine owner. Pyrite (iron pyrites) was used to make sulphuric acid, providing a potential market. In 1913, a trial shipment of 100 tons of pyrite was sold. Garland was soon advocating—despite his earlier political stance in favour of free trade—the imposition of a duty on imported iron pyrites, claiming his mine would be a local source.

Prior to 1920, the closest railway connection was at Craboon, on the Gwabegar railway line. In 1913, the construction of a branch line from Craboon to Coolah—passing through Leadville and servicing the mines there—was already under active consideration. Garland advocated the new line, as a means to lower the cost of Leadville iron pyrites to superphosphate fertiliser manufacturers. An act to build the line was passed in December 1915; it opened in March 1920.

In 1916, iron pyrites was shipped to the Wallaroo-Mount Lyall Superphosphate Works, and in 1920 to the Cockle Creek Smelter, over the new railway line. Around this time, in 1919, the population of Leadville and its surrounding area was still 772. However, misfortune followed; Channon died in December 1920 and, on 14 October 1921, many buildings in the town and at the mine were damaged by a violent storm. Garland lost his earlier enthusiasm for operating the mine, and with it the support of the town.

In late 1926, the "Leadville Mines"—consisting of the Mount Stewart, Grosvenor, and Extended Mines— were on the market, "For the purposes of winding up a partnership", presumably the partnership of Garland and Channon's heirs. Garland had lost interest in reopening the mine, by 1929, further angering the people of the town whose future prosperity depended upon it. Garland died in 1930.

In 1932 the Mount Stewart Syndicate reopened the mine and began shipping iron pyrites to Australian Fertilisers Limited at Port Kembla but, in 1935, the mining ceased. In 1934–1935, there had been a bitter demarcation dispute between the Miners Federation and the Australian Workers Union, at Leadville, and, in April 1935, there was suspected sabotage at the mine. The dispute may have been a factor in bringing about the mine's closure. However, it was another industrial dispute—at distant Port Kembla—that was held responsible for the cessation of iron pyrites mining at Leadville and putting 50 men out of work. Imminent reopening was anticipated—for some years—but did not occur.

In 1951, the Leadville Mining Company, produced a small amount of ore and concentrate and, in 1952, Mr R.H. Spence attempted to recover silver from the mine tailings using the cyanide process, unsuccessfully. That was the last mineral production at Leadville.

After the First World War, two locations near Leadville, 'Pine Ridge' and 'Lawson Park', became soldier-settlement areas. Consequently, a number of returned servicemen settled in the area. Leadville became a soldier-settler town, during the inter-war years, as mining declined.

In 1935, Leadville had a population of 250 (the district 600), a public school, post office, two hotels, two churches, bakery, butcher, billiard hall, fruiterer, newsagent, stock and station agent, a commercial store, a brand new community hall, and a passenger train from Sydney, every day except Saturday.

Around 1960, the town experienced a serious decline, as businesses and services drifted away to Dunedoo. In 1960 and 1965, town allotments—including many still owned by Charles Garland's estate—were sold to recover unpaid rates. The school—opened in 1892—closed in 1972. The post office—opened in 1891—closed in 1991.

Leadville railway station opened in 1920 and closed in 1975. It was located just to the north of the town. The Coolah branch railway last carried trains in 1982. For a time, a railway from Leadville to Merriwa was proposed as an alternative to the Sandy Hollow to Maryvale railway; in the end neither line would be completed.

The town's most famous son was Major-General Sir Ivan Dougherty (1907-1998). The continuation of Garland St, after it crosses the town's boundary, is named Sir Ivan Dougherty Drive in his honour.

== Remnants ==
Modern-day Leadville is a quiet place. What remains of the town today lies just to the east of the site of the former Mount Stewart Mine. Most of the town allotments have been subsumed into larger blocks and paddocks but can still be viewed using Google Maps. The town's cemetery still exists.

== See also ==
- Denison Town, nearby ghost town
