= Barnard Stimpson =

English-born Australian politician

Barnard Stimpson (1819 – 12 October 1897) was an English-born Australian politician.

He was born in Berkshire to contractor Barnard Stimpson and his wife Rebecca. He migrated to New South Wales around 1834 and became a pastoralist. On 27 February 1842 he married Anne Henry, with whom he had one daughter. In 1864 he was elected to the New South Wales Legislative Assembly for Carcoar, but he did not re-contest in 1869. Stimpson died at Carcoar in 1897.

New South Wales Legislative Assembly
Preceded by William Dalley	Member for Carcoar; 1864–1869	Succeeded by Richard Driver
