= 1882 New South Wales colonial election =

Colonial election for New South Wales, Australia in 1882

- 30 November 1882 – 21 December 1882

All 113 seats in the New South Wales Legislative Assembly 57 Assembly seats were needed for a majority
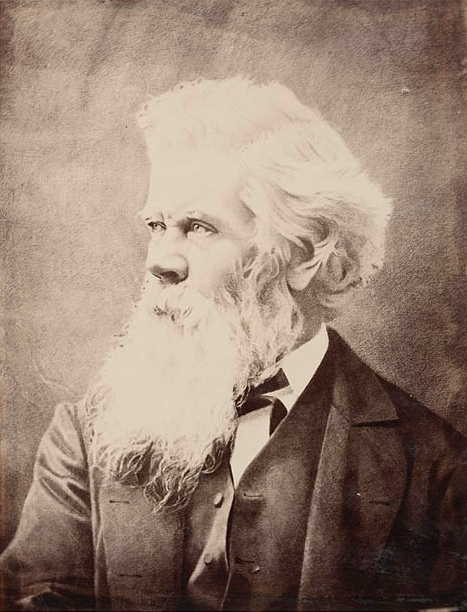

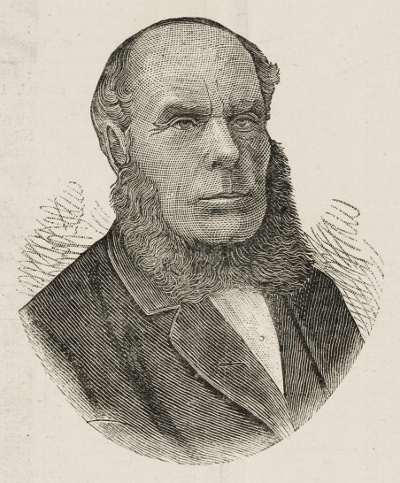
Leader	Sir Henry Parkes	Alexander Stuart
Leader's seat	East Sydney (elected for Tenterfield)	Illawarra
Premier before election
Sir Henry Parkes
Elected Premier
Alexander Stuart

The 1882 New South Wales colonial election was held between 30 November and 21 December 1882. This election was for all of the 113 seats in the New South Wales Legislative Assembly and it was conducted in 40 single-member constituencies, 26 2-member constituencies, three 3-member constituencies and three 4-member constituencies, all with a first past the post system. Suffrage was limited to adult male British subjects, resident in New South Wales. The previous parliament of New South Wales was dissolved on 23 November 1882 by the Governor, Lord Augustus Loftus, on the advice of the Premier, Sir Henry Parkes.

There was no recognisable party structure at this election; instead the government was determined by a loose, shifting factional system.

== Key dates ==
Date	Event
23 November 1882	The Legislative Assembly was dissolved, and writs were issued by the Governor to proceed with an election.
28 November to 15 December 1882	Nominations for candidates for the election closed.
30 November to 21 December 1882	Polling days.
3 January 1883	Opening of new Parliament.

== Results ==
New South Wales colonial election, 30 November – 21 December 1882 Legislative Assembly << 1880–1885 >>
Enrolled voters					
Votes cast	164,515		Turnout	56.69	−5.25
Informal votes	2,047		Informal	2.10	+0.14
Summary of votes by party
Party	Primary votes	%	Swing	Seats	Change
Total	164,515			113	

== See also ==
- Members of the New South Wales Legislative Assembly, 1882–1885
- Candidates of the 1882 New South Wales colonial election
