= Charles Garland (Australian politician) =

Australian politician

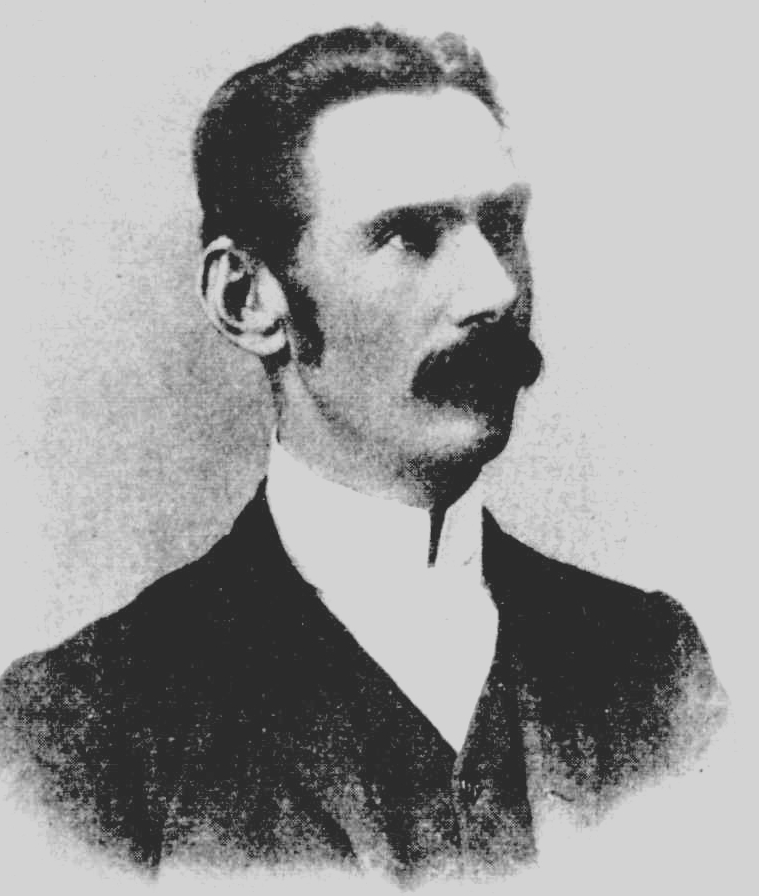
Charles Garland c.1899.

Charles Launcelot Garland (1854 – 7 January 1930) was a New Zealand-born Australian politician and mining entrepreneur. He was the founder of the town of Leadville, New South Wales.

He was born at Auckland to sea captain William Riley Garland and Nancy Turner. He was a miner from an early age, and migrated to New South Wales in 1879. Around 1882 he married Mary Newland, with whom he had a son. Garland died in Sydney in 1930.

== Business career ==
From 1882 he was an assurance agent, and was also successful mining at Leadville, on the Palmer River in Far North Queensland, and on the Macquarie River.

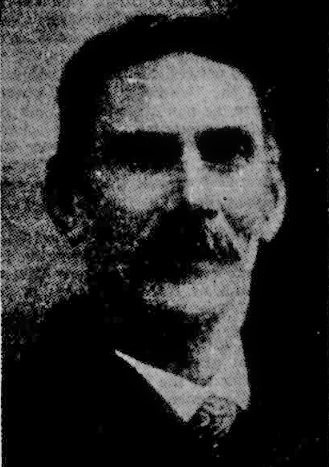
Charles Garland, in later life.

Garland is credited with being the first to introduce gold dredging—a technique used extensively in his native New Zealand—to New South Wales, He launched the first gold dredge on the Macquarie in 1899. By 1905, there were 42 dredges working in New South Wales, resulting in a significant revival of gold production.

== Political career ==
In 1885 he was elected to the New South Wales Legislative Assembly as the member for Carcoar. He retired in 1891.

== See also ==
- Leadville, New South Wales

New South Wales Legislative Assembly
Preceded by George Campbell	Member for Carcoar; 1885–1891; Served alongside: Baker/Jeanneret/Plumb	Succeeded by Denis Donnelly; Charles Jeanneret
