= Thomas West (Australian politician) =

Australian politician

Thomas Henry West (12 April 1830 – 9 December 1896) was an Australian politician.

He was born at Macquarie Plains to farmer Joseph West and Sarah Hannah Peisley. He was a pastoralist and ran the Cudgelong station. On 1 December 1860 he married Elizabeth McKay. In 1872 he was elected to the New South Wales Legislative Assembly for Carcoar, but he retired in 1874. West died at Cowra in 1896.

New South Wales Legislative Assembly
| Preceded by Richard Driver | Member for Carcoar; 1872–1874 | Succeeded by Solomon Meyer |
