= George Ranken (surveyor) =

George Ranken (17 July 1827 – 6 May 1895) was a Scottish-born Australian surveyor, pastoralist and writer.

He was born in Ayrshire to solicitor Thomas Ranken and Jean Campbell Logan. He became a surveyor, and in 1851 migrated to Victoria, where he worked for the Bank of New South Wales as a gold buyer. From 1855 he farmed around Wide Bay and the Burnett River in partnership with William Landsborough. He returned to Scotland in 1858, and the following year married Fanny Sarah Shaw. Returning to Queensland in late 1859, he lived at Rockhampton, and from March 1868 was commissioner of crown lands for Port Curtis (Leichhardt from September 1868). He was charged with attempted murder in 1869, but he was acquitted.

Ranken then moved to Sydney, where he was a partner in a stock and station agency. He was an estate agent from 1876, based in St Leonards where he was also an alderman and mayor (1886). He wrote a column for the Sydney Morning Herald under the name "Capricornus", primarily addressing land issues. He published a novel as W. H. Walker in 1877, The Invasion; a subsequent novel, Windabyne, was serialised in 1878–79. From 1879 he served on the royal commission into the Lands Department, and from 1883 was joint commissioner into land laws with Augustus Morris, delivering a controversial report which was vigorously attacked by Sir John Robertson, but upon which the 1884 Crown Lands Act was based. From 1888 Ranken was a surveyor in Young, and in 1891 he published The Federal Geography of British Australasia. He died in Young in 1895.
