= William Redfern Watt =

Irish-born Australian politician

William Redfern Watt (1813 – 17 October 1894) was an Irish-born Australian politician.

He was born at Belfast and migrated to New South Wales around 1832, to manage the properties of his uncle William Redfern. Around 1838 he married Mary Grant, with whom he had six children. A pastoralist, he had acquired 70,000 acres in the Lachlan River district by 1859, when he was elected to the New South Wales Legislative Assembly for Carcoar. He remained in the Assembly until his resignation in 1862. Watt died at Waverley in 1894.

New South Wales Legislative Assembly
New seat	Member for Carcoar; 1859–1862	Succeeded by William Dalley
