= Charles Jeanneret (politician) =

Australian steamboat owner and politician

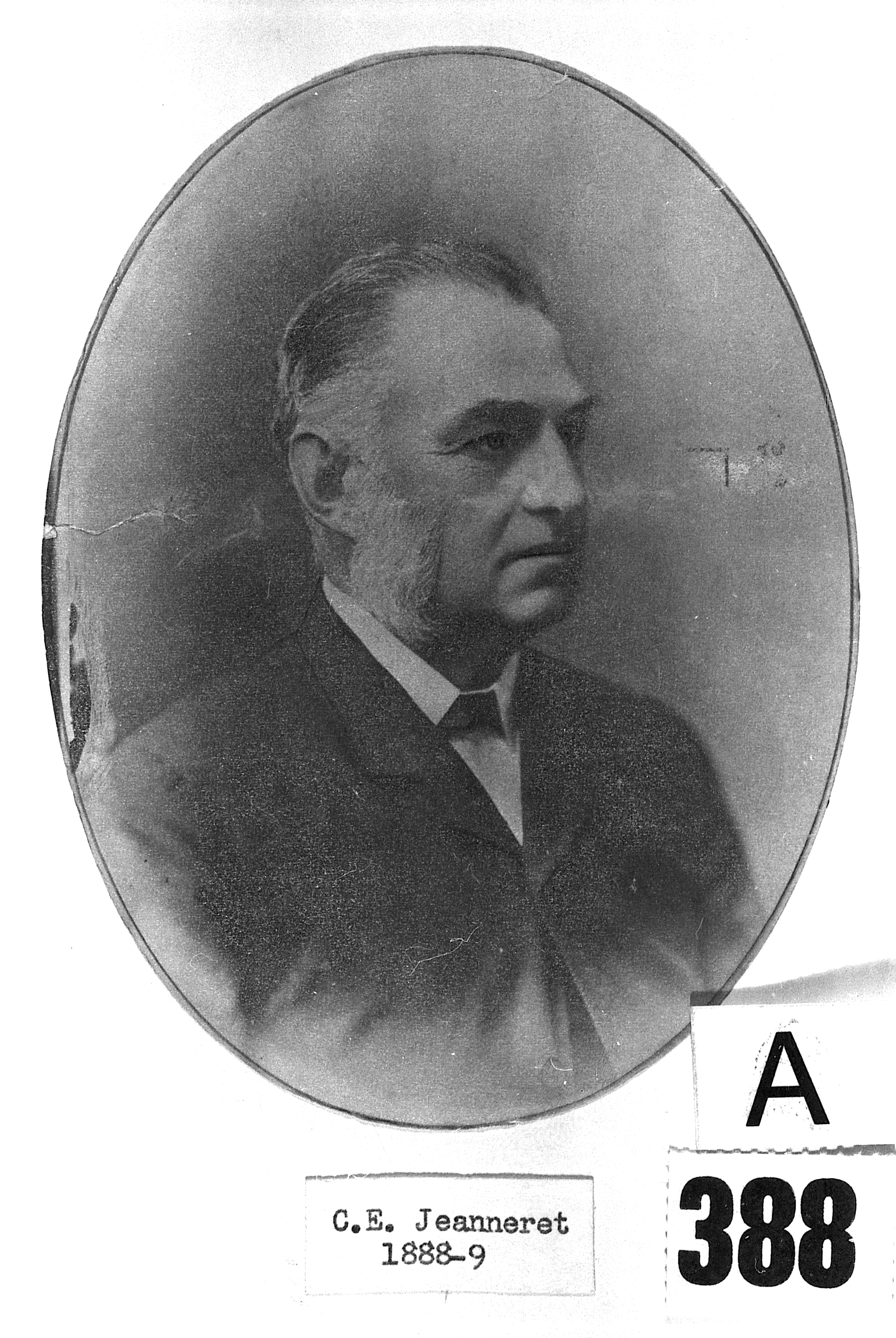

Member of the New South Wales Parliament for Carcoar
- In office 12 February 1887 – 19 January 1889
- Preceded by: Ezekiel Baker; Charles Garland
- Succeeded by: John Plumb; Charles Garland
- In office 19 June 1891 – 25 June 1894
- Preceded by: John Plumb; Charles Garland
- Succeeded by: District abolished

Alderman of the City of Sydney for Bourke Ward
- In office 1 December 1886 – 23 August 1898

Personal details
- Born: 9 February 1834 Sydney, Colony of New South Wales
- Died: 23 August 1898 (aged 64) Wyrallah, Colony of New South Wales

Charles Edward Jeanneret (9 February 1834 – 23 August 1898) was an Australian businessman and politician. He was born in Sydney to dentist Henry Jeanneret and Harriet Merrett. As a boy he was sent to Flinders Island to learn navigation and seamanship, and after a trip to Europe and three years at the goldfields, he settled in Sydney around 1857. On 12 June 1857 he married Julia Bellingham, with whom he would have ten children. He worked for the Bank of New South Wales and lived at Hunters Hill, becoming a well-known local businessman, especially in the steam boat and ferry companies. He formed the Parramatta River Steam Company in 1865 which would become the major ferry operator on the river. In 1843, he created a tramway that linked the second Parramatta wharf (Redbank Wharf, near Duck River) with the centre of Parramatta.

He was a Hunters Hill alderman and mayor from 1870 to 1871, and served on Sydney City Council from 1886 to 1898.

He was a candidate for the New South Wales Legislative Assembly for the district of Central Cumberland at the 1874–75 election, but was defeated. He was elected as the Free Trade member for Carcoar at the 1887 election. He unsuccessfully contested Macleay at the 1889 election, he was re-elected to Carcoar in 1891. Carcoar was abolished in 1894 and the district divided between West Macquarie and the new district of Cowra and Jeanneret unsuccessfully contested West Macquarie at the 1894 election. He was bankrupted in 1897.

Jeanneret died at his son's home at Richmond River near Wyrallah, on 23 August 1898 (aged 64). The NSW Parliament website incorrectly records his death location as simply "Richmond".

Civic offices
Preceded by Didier Joubert	Mayor of Hunter's Hill; 1870–1872	Succeeded by Robert Vining Gale
Preceded by Ambrose Fitzpatrick	Mayor of Hunter's Hill; 1877–1879	Succeeded by Angelo Tornaghi
Preceded by Alfred Weeks	Mayor of Hunter's Hill; 1890–1891	Succeeded by Frank McNeil
New South Wales Legislative Assembly
Preceded by Ezekiel Baker; Charles Garland	Member for Carcoar; 1887–1889; Served alongside: Charles Garland	Succeeded by John Plumb; Charles Garland
Preceded by John Plumb; Charles Garland	Member for Carcoar; 1891–1894; Served alongside: Denis Donnelly	Abolished replaced by Cowra and West Macquarie
