= 1874–75 New South Wales colonial election =

Colonial election for New South Wales, Australia in 1874–75

New South Wales colonial election, 1874–75
- 8 December 1874 – 12 January 1875

All 72 seats in the New South Wales Legislative Assembly 37 Assembly seats were needed for a majority
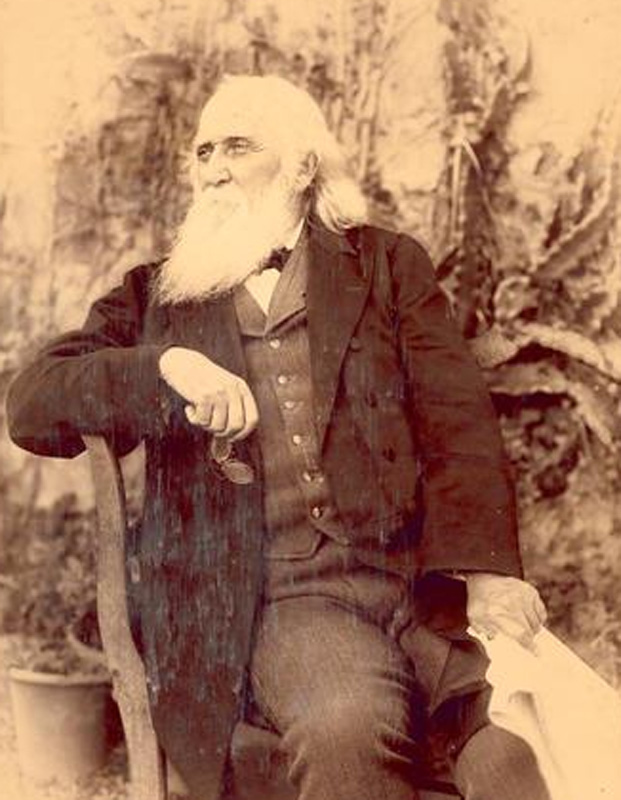

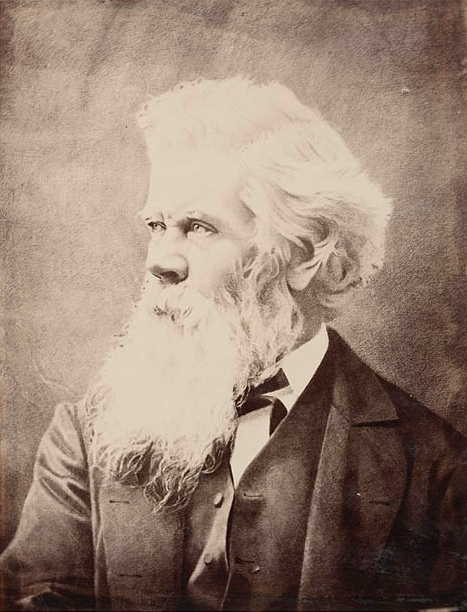
Leader	John Robertson	Henry Parkes
Leader's seat	West Sydney	East Sydney
Premier before election
Henry Parkes
Elected Premier
John Robertson

The 1874–75 New South Wales colonial election was held between 8 December 1874 and 12 January 1875. This election was for all of the 72 seats in the New South Wales Legislative Assembly and it was conducted in 52 single-member constituencies, six 2-member constituencies and two 4-member constituencies, all with a first past the post system. Suffrage was limited to adult white males. The previous parliament of New South Wales was dissolved on 28 November 1874 by the Governor, Sir Hercules Robinson, on the advice of the Premier, Henry Parkes.

There was no recognisable party structure at this election; instead the government was determined by a loose, shifting factional system.

== Key dates ==
Date	Event
28 November 1874	The Legislative Assembly was dissolved, and writs were issued by the Governor to proceed with an election.
7 December 1874 to 4 January 1875	Nominations for candidates for the election closed.
8 December 1874 to 12 January 1875	Polling days.
27 January 1875	Opening of new Parliament.

== Results ==
New South Wales colonial election, 8 December 1874 – 12 January 1875 Legislative Assembly << 1872–1877 >>
Enrolled voters					
Votes cast	60,031		Turnout	47.21	−1.23
Informal votes	762		Informal	1.20	+0.20
Summary of votes by party
Party	Primary votes	%	Swing	Seats	Change
Total	60,031			72	

== See also ==
- Members of the New South Wales Legislative Assembly, 1874–1877
- Candidates of the 1874–75 New South Wales colonial election
