= William Bede Dalley =

Australian politician (1831–1888)

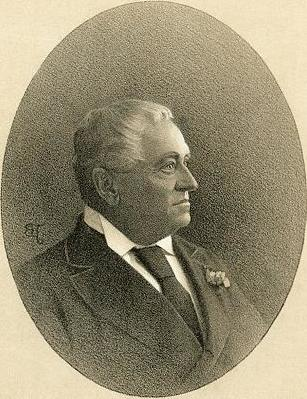
- Dalley c. 1880s
- Born: July 1831; Sydney, Australia
- Died: 28 October 1888 (aged 57)
- Education: Sydney College; St Mary's College
- Occupations: Politician, barrister
- Children: John Bede Dalley (son)

William Bede Dalley (5 July 1831 – 28 October 1888) was an Australian politician and barrister and the first Australian appointed to the Privy Council of the United Kingdom. He was a leading lay representative and champion of the Catholic community and was known for his parliamentary and legal eloquence.

== Early life ==
Dalley was born at Sydney in 1831. His father John Dalley was from Broadwindsor, Dorset, his mother Catherine Spillane was from Kinsale, County Cork. They were both convicts. He was educated at the Sydney College and St Mary's College. He was called to the bar in 1856.

== Political career ==
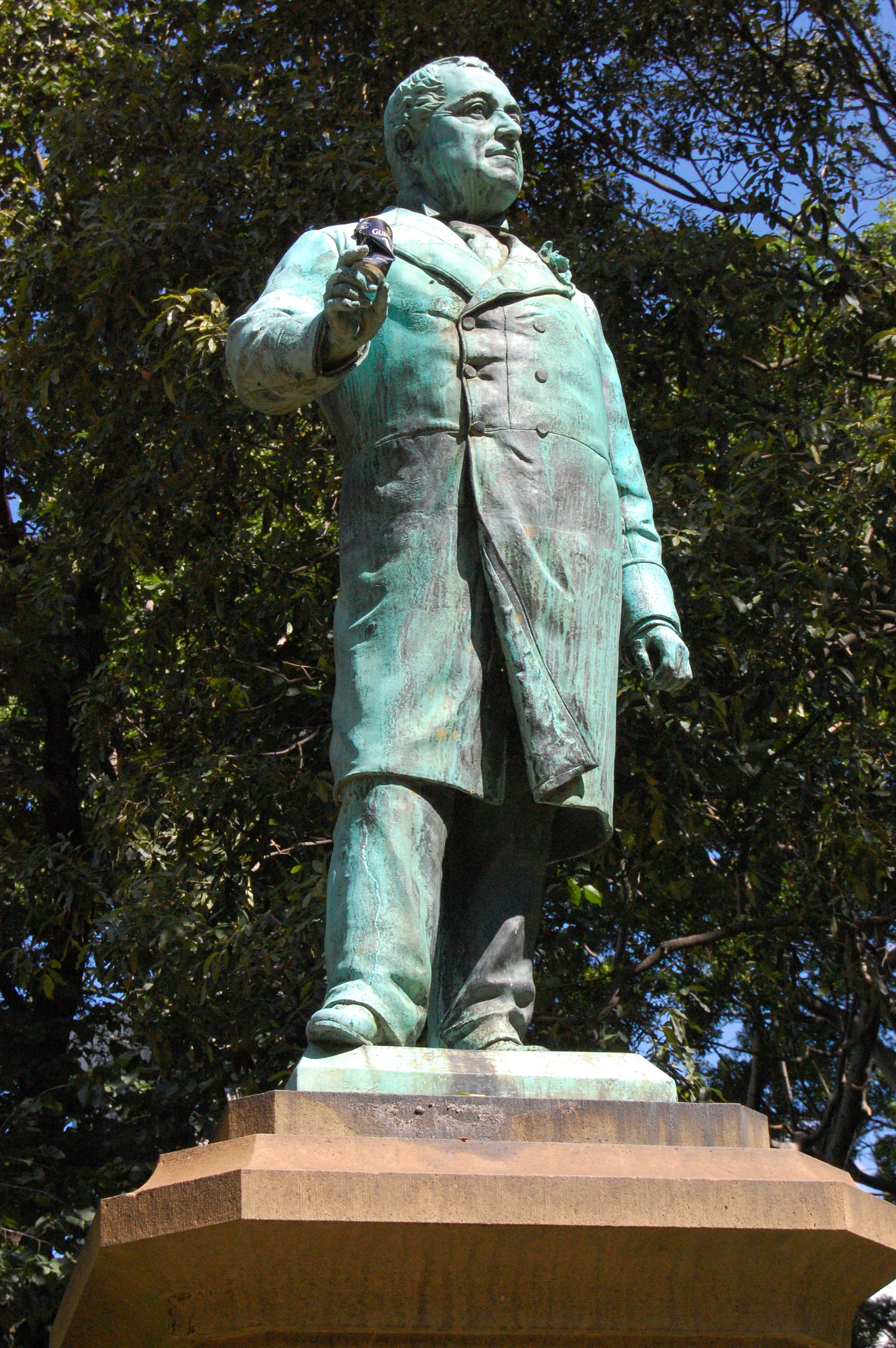
A (vandalised) statue of Dalley in Sydney

In 1857 Dalley was elected to the Legislative Assembly as a representative of Sydney (City). In 1858 he successfully contested Cumberland Boroughs to help Charles Cowper's re-election in Sydney. He pressed for several reforms including an unsuccessful attempt to abolish the death penalty for rape. He joined the second Cowper ministry as Solicitor General in November 1858, but held this position for only three months. In 1859 he became the member for Windsor, but resigned in February 1860 in order to visit Europe.

After his return to Australia in 1862, Dalley resumed his legal practice and represented Carcoar from 1862 to 1864. In 1868 he defended Henry James O'Farrell for attempting to assassinate Prince Alfred, on grounds of insanity, but was not able to prevent a conviction and a speedy hanging. In 1872 Dalley married an Anglican lady, Eleanor Long, which strained his relations with the Catholic Church. She died of typhoid fever in 1881, leaving him with three young children. He supported a petition for the freeing of Frank Gardiner which had been brought by Gardiner's sisters on the grounds of the harshness of his sentence. The petition was successful; Gardiner was freed and went into exile, but the resulting public reaction led to the collapse of the Parkes government.

=== Attorney General ===
In February 1875 Dalley joined the third Robertson ministry as Attorney General of New South Wales and was nominated to the Legislative Council. He was appointed a Queen's Counsel on 19 March 1877, towards the end of his first term as Attorney General. Robertson resigned in March 1877, although in 1881 he petitioned against the Chinese restriction bill on the floor of the Legislative Council and managed to change some of its worst features. In January 1883 he became Attorney General in the Stuart ministry, and in 1884 his Speeches on the Proposed Federal Council for Australasia were published.

In 1887 he joined with Parkes and Cardinal Moran in pleading against the hangings for the Mount Rennie rape case. Their effort was unsuccessful.

He died in the Sydney suburb of Darling Point. One of his sons John Bede Dalley became well known as a journalist and novelist in Sydney.

There is a memorial to him in St Paul's Cathedral.

== Dalley's Castle ==
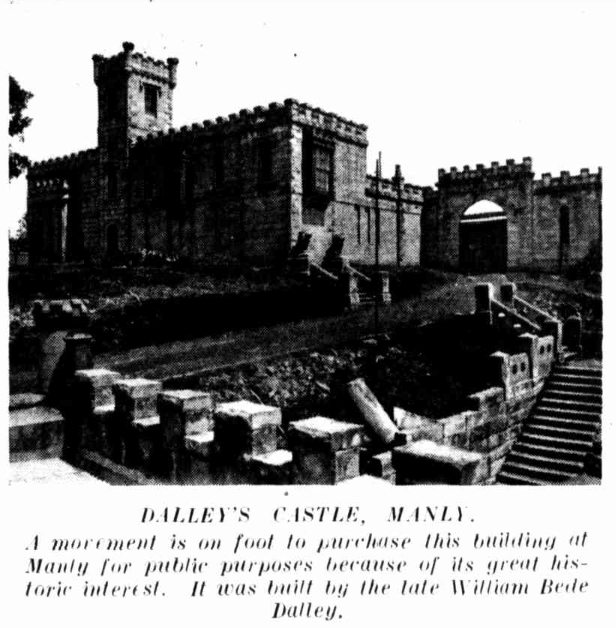

The homes he owned on the northern beaches were Marinella, commonly called Dalley's Castle, at Manly and a house called variously Yellamb i, Tallamalla, Bilgola House and Bilgola Cottage, immediately behind Bilgola Beach. While the house at Bilgola was built as a weekender, Marinella was built as a home, although Dalley's use of both was brief. Dalley bought 0.4ha on a knoll overlooking Manly in late 1882 and had a large home, called Marinella, erected upon it, although it was invariably known as Dalley's Castle because of its size and dominant position overlooking the village. The property Dalley bought also included an existing cottage and a stone tower that had previously housed a camera obscura. The Gothic Roman castle was built in 1882–1883 and by 1884 Dalley is listed as living there, although the following years were among his busiest and he had other properties closer to the city, so the amount of time he spent at Marinella is uncertain. Dalley's Castle was demolished in 1939, despite strong local opposition, and Housing Commission flats, ironically called Marinella, were built on the site.

== Honours ==
In 1886, after refusing a knighthood, he was appointed to the privy council.

== Memorials and legacy ==
Following Dalley's death in 1888, a public committee raised funds through public subscription to commission a permanent monument. A large bronze statue of Dalley, crafted by renowned sculptor James White, was placed at the northern end of Hyde Park, Sydney. Natural weathering of the bronze monument has seen it become colloquially known to Sydneysiders as "the green man of Hyde Park."

The National Rugby League (NRL) 'Player of the Year' award, is called the Dally M Medal in honour of rugby league player Herbert 'Dally' Messenger. The 'Dally' part was a misspelling of 'Dalley', a nickname given to him as a boy in the mid-1880s by his father Charles A. Messenger, a boating and sailing confrère of William Bede Dalley.

Political offices
Preceded by Alfred Lutwyche	Solicitor General; 1858 – 1859	Succeeded by John Hargrave
Preceded by Joseph Innes	Attorney General; 1875 – Mar 1877	Succeeded by William Windeyer
Preceded by William Windeyer	Attorney General; Aug – Dec 1877	Succeeded by William Foster
Preceded by Robert Wisdom	Attorney General; 1883 – 1885	Succeeded by Jack Want
New South Wales Legislative Assembly
New district	Member for Sydney City; 1856–1858	Succeeded by George Thornton
Preceded by William Bowman	Member for Cumberland Boroughs; 1858–1859	Seat abolished
New district	Member for Windsor; 1859–1860	Succeeded by William Walker
Preceded by William Watt	Member for Carcoar; 1862–1864	Succeeded by Barnard Stimpson
