= Electoral district of Goldfields South =

Former state electoral district of New South Wales, Australia

Goldfields South was an electoral district of the Legislative Assembly in the Australian state of New South Wales from 1859 to 1880, including the goldfields within several southern electorates. Rolls were not kept for goldfields seats, voters being able to establish their right to vote by presenting either a mining licence or business licence in a proclaimed gold field that had been held for at least six months. Voters could also appear on the roll for general districts, but were prevented from voting in both their resident general district and the overlaying goldfields district.

== Members for Goldfields South ==
Member	Party	Period
Bowie Wilson	None	1859–1864
James Rodd	None	1865–1869
Ezekiel Baker	None	1870–1880

== Election results ==
1877 New South Wales colonial election: Goldfields South Monday 12 November
Candidate	Votes	%
Ezekiel Baker (re-elected)	unopposed	
