= Richard Driver =

Australian solicitor, politician and cricket administrator (1829–1880)

Richard Driver Jr.
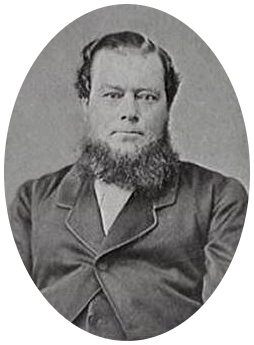

Member of the New South Wales Parliament for West Macquarie
- In office 1860–1869
- Preceded by: Henry Mort
- Succeeded by: Edmund Webb

Member of the New South Wales Parliament for Carcoar
- In office 1869–1872
- Preceded by: Barnard Stimpson
- Succeeded by: Thomas West

Member of the New South Wales Parliament for Windsor
- In office 1872–1880
- Preceded by: Arthur Dight
- Succeeded by: Henry McQuade

Richard Driver (junior) (16 September 1829 – 8 July 1880) was a Sydney solicitor, politician and cricket administrator.

Driver was born in Cabramatta, New South Wales, son of Richard Driver, hotel-keeper, and his wife Elizabeth, née Powell. In 1859, he became a solicitor for the Sydney City Council and also carried out a practice in the Sydney police court.

Driver unsuccessfully contested three seats in the New South Wales Legislative Assembly in 1858 and was defeated again for East Sydney in 1859, but won West Macquarie in 1860 and held it to 1869. He was the member for Carcoar from 1869 to 1872 and Windsor from 1872 to his death in 1880. He generally supported Henry Parkes, but turned down an offer of to be made minister of mines in 1872. He became Secretary for Lands in Parkes' 1877 government and as a cricket lover he provided £700 for improvements to the Sydney Cricket Ground and vested the ground in trustees in 1879, including himself as the representative of the New South Wales Cricket Association.

Driver played in New South Wales' first first-class cricket match against Victoria in Melbourne in 1856. He travelled with the team as the scorer, but when one of the selected team members failed to turn up, he played instead. Batting at No. 11, he made 18 in the first innings, helping to take the score from 9 for 40 to 76 all out. New South Wales won narrowly, and Driver was the match's equal highest scorer. It was his only match for New South Wales. He umpired four of New South Wales' first-class matches between 1857 and 1877. From 1860 to 1880 he was an important organiser of visits by English cricket teams and intercolonial matches. He was president of the New South Wales Cricket Association from 1870 to 1880.

In 1865 Driver was the inaugural president of Sydney's first ever football club, the Sydney FC (Australian rules football).

In 1871 Driver married Elizabeth Margaret Marlow. He died in the Sydney suburb of Randwick in July 1880 and is buried at Waverley Cemetery.

The road situated along the eastern boundary of the Moore Park fields and the western side of the Sydney Cricket Ground and Sydney Football Stadium is named Driver Avenue in his honour.

== See also ==
- Mennell, Philip (1892). "Driver, Richard" . The Dictionary of Australasian Biography. London: Hutchinson & Co – via Wikisource.
- Sydney Riot of 1879
- List of New South Wales representative cricketers

Parliament of New South Wales
Political offices
Preceded by Ezekiel Baker	Secretary for Lands; March – August 1877	Succeeded by Thomas Garrett
New South Wales Legislative Assembly
Preceded by Henry Mort	Member for West Macquarie; 1860–1869	Succeeded by Edmund Webb
Preceded by Barnard Stimpson	Member for Carcoar; 1869–1872	Succeeded by Thomas West
Preceded by Arthur Dight	Member for Windsor; 1872–1880	Succeeded by Henry McQuade
