= George Campbell (New South Wales politician) =

Australian politician

George Campbell (13 June 1827 – 2 September 1890) was an Australian politician.

He was born near Bathurst to pastoralist Archibald Campbell and Ellen Stoddart. He married Jessie Blackwood in Glasgow; they had nine children. A pastoralist, he owned property near Cowra. In 1881 he was elected to the New South Wales Legislative Assembly for Carcoar, serving until 1885, when he retired. In 1888 he was appointed to the New South Wales Legislative Council, where he remained until his death at Jerula near Cowra in 1890.

New South Wales Legislative Assembly
Preceded by Ezekiel Baker	Member for Carcoar; 1881–1885; Served alongside: Andrew Lynch/Ezekiel Baker	Succeeded by Charles Garland
