= Solomon Meyer =

English-born Australian politician

Solomon Meyer (1823 – 25 February 1902) was an English-born Australian politician.

He was born in London, the son of silk manufacturer Jacob Meyer. In 1841 he migrated to Tasmania, where he managed a business, before moving to Sydney around 1845. On 2 July 1844 he married Theophilia Faulder; they had one son. In 1851 he opened the Ophir goldfields' first general store, and he settled at Carcoar. He was an alderman at Goulburn and ran a grocery and ironmongery business. In 1874 he was elected to the New South Wales Legislative Assembly for Carcoar, but he resigned in 1876. Meyer died at Goulburn in 1902.

New South Wales Legislative Assembly
Preceded by Thomas West	Member for Carcoar; 1874–1876	Succeeded by Andrew Lynch
