= Andrew Lynch (Australian politician) =

Australian politician and pastoralist

Andrew Lynch (1819 – 2 November 1884) was an Australian politician.

He was a pastoralist at Carcoar before entering politics. In 1876 he was elected to the New South Wales Legislative Assembly for Carcoar, serving until his death in 1884.

New South Wales Legislative Assembly
Preceded by Solomon Meyer	Member for Carcoar; 1876–1884; Served alongside: none/Ezekiel Baker/George Campbell	Succeeded by Ezekiel Baker
