= Electoral district of Carcoar =

Former state electoral district of New South Wales, Australia

Carcoar was an electoral district of the Legislative Assembly in the Australian state of New South Wales, originally created in 1859 to the southwest of Bathurst and named after Carcoar. It replaced part of Western Boroughs and part of Bathurst (County). From 1880 to 1894, it elected two members. It was abolished in 1894 and was partly replaced by Cowra.

== Members for Carcoar ==
Single-member (1859–1880)
Member	Party	Term			
William Watt	None	1859–1862			
William Dalley	None	1862–1864			
Barnard Stimpson	None	1864–1869			
Richard Driver	None	1869–1872			
Thomas West	None	1872–1874			
Solomon Meyer	None	1874–1876			
Andrew Lynch	None	1876–1880			
Two members (1880–1894)
Member	Party	Term	Member	Party	Term
Ezekiel Baker	None	1880–1881	Andrew Lynch	None	1880–1884
George Campbell	None	1881–1885	Andrew Lynch	None	1880–1884
George Campbell	None	1881–1885	Ezekiel Baker	None	1884–1887
Charles Garland	None	1885–1887	Ezekiel Baker	None	1884–1887
Charles Garland	Free Trade	1887–1891	Charles Jeanneret	Free Trade	1887–1889
Charles Garland	Free Trade	1887–1891	John Plumb	Free Trade	1889–1891
Denis Donnelly	Protectionist	1891–1894	Charles Jeanneret	Free Trade	1891–1894

== Election results ==
1891 New South Wales colonial election: Carcoar Friday 19 June
Party	Candidate	Votes	%	±%
Protectionist	Denis Donnelly (elected 1)	1,124	25.9	
Free Trade	Charles Jeanneret (elected 2)	1,110	25.6	
Free Trade	John Plumb (defeated)	1,103	25.4	
Protectionist	Alfred Fremlin	921	21.2	
Protectionist	Ezekiel Baker	81	1.9	
Total formal votes		4,339	98.8	
Informal votes		51	1.2	
Turnout		2,327	63.2	
Protectionist gain 1 from Free Trade				
Free Trade hold 1				
