= Members of the New South Wales Legislative Assembly, 1869–1872 =

Members of the New South Wales Legislative Assembly who served in the sixth parliament of New South Wales held their seats from 1869 to 1872. The 1869–70 election was held between 3 December 1869 and 10 January 1870 with parliament first meeting on 27 January 1870. There were 72 members elected for 52 single member electorates, 6 two member electorates and 2 four member electorates. Due to a change in the Constitution of New South Wales the maximum term of this parliament was reduced from 5 years to 3. However the assembly was dissolved after only 25 months after the third government of Sir James Martin lost a vote of supply. The Speaker was William Arnold.

Name	Electorate	Years in office
Maurice Alexander	Goulburn	1861–1872
George Allen	Glebe	1869–1883
William Arnold	Paterson	1856–1875
Ezekiel Baker (Note: Goldfields South MLA Ezekiel Baker resigned from parliament in June 1870. He was re-elected unopposed at the resulting by-election on 20 June 1870.) (Note: Goldfields South MLA Ezekiel Baker resigned from parliament when he was appointed to the Goldfields Royal Commission. He was re-elected at the resulting by-election on 12 December 1870.)	Goldfields South, Carcoar	1870–1877, 1879–1881, 1884–1887
Thomas Bawden	Clarence	1869–1880
Archibald Bell	Upper Hunter	1868–1872
William Brookes	Northumberland	1869–1872
Edward Brown	Tumut	1866–1872, 1891–1894
Stephen Brown	Newtown	1864–1881
David Buchanan	East Sydney	1860–1862, 1864–1867, 1869–1877, 1879–1885, 1888–1889
Edward Butler	Argyle	1869–1877
James Byrnes	Parramatta	1858–1861, 1864–1872
James Campbell	Morpeth	1864–1874
Henry Clarke	Eden	1869–1894, 1895–1904
Walter Church	Goldfields West	1869–1872
Sir Charles Cowper (Note: Liverpool Plains MLA Charles Cowper resigned in December 1870 after accepting the position of Agent-General in London. The resulting by-election on 9 January 1871 was won by Lewis Levy.)	Liverpool Plains	1856–1859, 1860–1870
William Cummings	East Macquarie	1859–1874
Thomas Dangar	Gwydir	1865–1885, 1887–1890
Horace Dean (Note: Hastings MLA Horace Dean's election was invalid because he held an office of profit under the crown. He was re-elected at the resulting by-election on 4 July 1870.) (Note: Hastings MLA Horace Dean's election was declared invalid because he was not a British subject. Robert Smith, the runner-up at the resulting by-election of 4 July 1870 was declared elected.)	Hastings	1869–1870
Arthur Dight	Windsor	1869–1872
John Dillon	Hunter	1869–1872 1877–1882
Richard Driver	Carcoar	1860–1880
Alexander Dodds	East Maitland	1864–1872
Joseph Eckford (Note: Wollombi MLA Joseph Eckford resigned in September 1870 because of financial difficulties. Having resolved these difficulties he was re-elected to the seat at the resulting by-election on 19 September 1870.)	Wollombi	1860–1872, 1877–1882
Daniel Egan (Note: Monaro MLA Daniel Egan died on 16 October 1870. The resulting by-election on 17 November 1870 was won by James Hart.)	Monaro	1856–1870
James Fallon	Hume	1869–1872
James Farnell	Parramatta	1860–1860, 1864–1885, 1887–1888
Michael Fitzpatrick	Yass Plains	1869–1881
Edward Flood	Central Cumberland	1856–1860 1869–1872
Robert Forster (Note: Goldfields North MLA Robert Wisdom was elected to two seats Goldfields North and Hunter. He resigned the seat of Goldfields North and represented Hunter. The resulting by-election on 18 April 1870 was won by Robert Forster.)	Goldfields North	1862–1864, 1870–1872, 1875–1877
William Forster	Queanbeyan	1856–1860, 1861–1864, 1864–1869, 1869–1874, 1875–1876, 1880–1882
Colin Fraser	Tenterfield	1869–1872
Thomas Garrett (Note: Shoalhaven MLA Thomas Garrett resigned in August 1871 to take the position of Police Magistrate at Berrima. The resulting by-election on 28 August 1871 was won by James Warden.)	Shoalhaven	1860–1871, 1872–1891
Edward Greville (Note: Braidwood MLA Michael Kelly's election was declared invalid due to electoral irregularities. The resulting by-election on 17 October 1870 was won by Edward Greville.)	Braidwood	1870–1880
James Hart	Monaro	1862–1864, 1870–1872, 1875–1877
Richard Hill	Canterbury	1868–1877
James Hoskins	Patrick's Plains	1859–1863, 1868–1882
Patrick Jennings	Murray	1869–1872, 1880–1887
Michael Kelly	Braidwood	1869–1870
George King	East Sydney	1869–1872
John Lackey	Central Cumberland	1860–1864, 1867–1880
Joseph Leary	Narellan	1860–1864, 1869–1872, 1876–1880
Benjamin Lee	West Maitland	1864–1874
Lewis Levy	Liverpool Plains	1871–1874
George Lloyd	Newcastle	1869–1877, 1880–1882, 1885–1887
George Lord	Bogan	1856–1877
John Lucas (Note: Canterbury MLA Montagu Stephen resigned in December 1870 to visit England. The resulting by-election on 6 January 1871 was won by John Lucas.)	Canterbury	1860–1869, 1871–1880
William Macleay	Murrumbidgee	1856–1874
Sir James Martin	East Sydney	1856, 1857–1860, 1862–1873
John Morrice	Camden	1860–1872
Henry Moses	Hawkesbury	1869–1880, 1882–1885
James Neale	Hartley	1864–1874
John Nowlan	Williams	1866–1874
Arthur Onslow	Camden	1869–1880
James Osborne	Illawarra	1869–1872
Henry Parkes (Note: East Sydney MLA Henry Parkes was elected to two seats, East Sydney and Kiama. He resigned the seat of East Sydney and represented Kiama. The resulting by-election on 23 February 1870 was won by Bowie Wilson.) (Note: Kiama MLA Henry Parkes resigned in October 1870 because of financial difficulties. Having resolved these difficulties he was re-elected to the seat at the resulting by-election on 3 November 1870.) (Note: Kiama MLA Henry Parkes resigned in December 1870 because of financial difficulties. The resulting by-election was won by John Stewart on 12 January 1871.) (Note: Mudgee MLA Henry Stephen resigned in December 1871. The resulting by-election on 2 January 1872 was won by Henry Parkes.)	Kiama, East Sydney, Mudgee	1856, 1858, 1859–1861, 1864–1870, 1872–1895
Joseph Phelps	Balranald	1864–1877
William Piddington	Hawkesbury	1856–1877
John Robertson (Note: West Sydney MLA John Robertson resigned in February 1870 because of financial difficulties. Having resolved these difficulties he was re-elected to the seat at the resulting by-election on 2 March 1870.)	West Sydney, Clarence	1856–1861, 1862–1865, 1865–1866, 1866–1870, 1870–1877, 1877–1878, 1882–1886
James Ryan	Nepean	1860–1872
Saul Samuel	Orange	1859–1860, 1862–1872
Robert Smith	Hastings	1870–1889
William Speer	West Sydney	1869–1872
Gerald Spring	Wellington	1869–1872, 1882–1887
Henry Stephen	Mudgee	1869–1871
Montagu Stephen	Canterbury	1869–1870
John Stewart	Kiama	1866–1869, 1871–1874
John Sutherland	Paddington	1860–1881, 1882–1889
John Suttor	East Macquarie	1867–1872
William Suttor	Bathurst	1856–1859, 1860–1864, 1866–1872
Samuel Terry (Note: New England MLA Charles Weaver resigned in August 1871. The resulting by-election on 28 August 1871 was won by Samuel Terry.)	New England	1859–1869, 1871–1881
William Tunks	St Leonards	1864–1874
James Warden	Shoalhaven	1871–1877
James Watson	Lachlan	1869–1882, 1884–1885
Joseph Wearne	West Sydney	1869–1875
Charles Weaver	New England	1869–1871
Edmund Webb	West Macquarie	1869–1871
Bowie Wilson	East Sydney	1859–1872
William Windeyer	West Sydney	1859–1862, 1866–1872, 1876–1879
Robert Wisdom	Lower Hunter, Goldfields North	1859–1872, 1874–1887

== See also ==
- Second Robertson ministry
- Fifth Cowper ministry
- Third Martin ministry
- Results of the 1869–70 New South Wales colonial election
- Candidates of the 1869–70 New South Wales colonial election

== Notes ==
There was no party system in New South Wales politics until 1887. Under the constitution, ministers were required to resign to recontest their seats in a by-election when appointed. These by-elections are only noted when the minister was defeated; in general, he was elected unopposed.
