= Candidates of the 1869–70 New South Wales colonial election =

This is a list of candidates for the 1869–70 New South Wales colonial election. The election was held from 3 December 1869 to 10 January 1870.

There was no recognisable party structure at this election.

== Retiring Members ==
- Marshall Burdekin MLA (East Sydney)
- Theophilus Cooper MLA (New England)
- Leopold De Salis MLA (Queanbeyan)
- Phillip Dignam MLA (Argyle)
- Hugh Gordon MLA (Tenterfield)
- James Hannell MLA (Newcastle)
- James Hart MLA (East Sydney)
- Robert Isaacs MLA (Yass Plains)
- Robert Landale MLA (Murray)
- John Lang MLA (West Sydney)
- John Lloyd MLA (Liverpool Plains)
- Samuel Lyons MLA (Central Cumberland)
- George McKay MLA (Orange)
- James Oatley MLA (Canterbury)
- Richard Roberts MLA (Camden)
- James Rodd MLA (Goldfields South)
- Thomas Smart MLA (Glebe)
- Robert Stewart MLA (East Sydney)
- Barnard Stimpson MLA (Carcoar)
- Atkinson Tighe MLA (Northumberland)

== Legislative Assembly ==
Sitting members are shown in bold text. Successful candidates are highlighted.

Electorates are arranged chronologically from the day the poll was held. Because of the sequence of polling, some sitting members who were defeated in their constituencies were then able to contest other constituencies later in the polling period. On the second occasion, these members are shown in italic text.

Electorate	Successful candidates	Unsuccessful candidates
Friday 3 December 1869
East Sydney	David Buchanan; George King; **James Martin**; **Henry Parkes**	William Cover; Charles Cowper; Robert Hunt; W Jennett; **James Neale**; Julian Salomons; Alexander Steel
Newcastle	George Lloyd	**James Martin**
Monday 6 December 1869
Paddington	**John Sutherland**	
Thursday 9 December 1869
Northumberland	William Brookes	Charles Cleveland; Samuel Gordon; Francis O'Brien; F J Shaw; Joseph Ward
West Sydney	**John Robertson**; William Speer; Joseph Wearne; **William Windeyer**	**William Campbell**; **Geoffrey Eagar**; Alexander Richardson
Friday 10 December 1869
Newtown	**Stephen Brown**	Patrick Shepherd
Monday 13 December 1869
Glebe	George Allen	
Wollombi	**Joseph Eckford**	Lyall Scott
Tuesday 14 December 1869
Braidwood	**Michael Kelly**	George Alley; Edward Greville
Camden	**John Morrice**; Arthur Onslow	Simon Belinfante; William Sherwin
Clarence	Thomas Bawden	
Eden	Henry Clarke	**Daniel Egan**
Goulburn	**Maurice Alexander**	
Illawarra	James Osborne	**John Stewart**
Kiama	**Henry Parkes**	Samuel Gray
Nepean	**James Ryan**	Thomas Shepherd; Archibald Thompson
Shoalhaven	**Thomas Garrett**	Samuel Goold
Wednesday 15 December 1869
Hunter	John Dillon	Alfred Boggis; **John Burns**
Paterson	**William Arnold**	Herbert Brown; George Townshend
West Macquarie	Edmund Webb	**Richard Driver**
Thursday 16 December 1869
East Maitland	**Alexander Dodds**	Stephen Scholey
Mudgee	Henry Stephen	**Samuel Terry**
Upper Hunter	**Archibald Bell**	William Gordon
Friday 17 December 1869
Argyle	Edward Butler	
Lower Hunter	**Robert Wisdom**	Archibald Jacob
Morpeth	**James Campbell**	John Keating
Narellan	Joseph Leary	**John Hurley**
Orange	**Saul Samuel**	
Parramatta	**James Byrnes**; **James Farnell**	George Oakes; Hugh Taylor
Saturday 18 December 1869
Hawkesbury	Henry Moses; **William Piddington**	James Aschough; **James Cunneen**; W P Wilshire
Monday 20 December 1869
Murrumbidgee	**William Macleay**	
St Leonards	**William Tunks**	**William Forster**
West Maitland	**Benjamin Lee**	Andrew Liddell
Tuesday 21 December 1869
East Macquarie	**William Cummings**; **John Suttor**	Samuel Robinson
Wednesday 22 December 1869
Bathurst	**William Suttor**	
Bogan	**George Lord**	John Ardill; Thomas Manning
Tumut	**Edward Brown**	Robert Lynch; J T V Walker
Williams	**John Nowlan**	William Mullen; Francis O'Brien; William Watson
Windsor	Arthur Dight	**William Walker**
Thursday 23 December 1869
Canterbury	**Richard Hill**; Montagu Stephen	William Henson; John Lucas; Thomas Sullivan; W R Templeton
Carcoar	Richard Driver	
Hartley	James Neale	Andrew Brown; John Garsed
Hastings	Horace Dean	Geoffrey Eagar; Henry Flett; William Forster; Robert Smith; Ebenezer Vickery
Hume	James Fallon	**Thomas Mate**
Liverpool Plains	Charles Cowper	Hanley Bennett
New England	Charles Weaver	Alexander Black; Robert Forster
Patrick's Plains	**James Hoskins**	**Bowie Wilson**
Queanbeyan	William Forster	Charles Campbell
Tenterfield	Colin Fraser	Robert Abbott; James Williamson
Friday 24 December 1869
Gwydir	**Thomas Dangar**	Edward Sharp
Yass Plains	Michael Fitzpatrick	
Tuesday 28 December 1869
Central Cumberland	Edward Flood; **John Lackey**	William Campbell; James Jones
Lachlan	James Watson	William Dalley; William Forster
Wellington	Gerald Spring	Charles Blakefield; Andrew Ross
Wednesday 29 December 1869
Murray	Patrick Jennings	Robert Hunt
Tuesday 4 January 1870
Monaro	Daniel Egan	**William Grahame**
Wednesday 5 January 1870
Balranald	**Joseph Phelps**	
Monday 10 January 1870
Goldfields North	**Robert Wisdom**	William Bourke; Henry Roman
Goldfields South	Ezekiel Baker	George Stephen
Goldfields West	**Walter Church**	Geoffrey Eagar; William Redman

== See also ==
- Members of the New South Wales Legislative Assembly, 1869–1872
