= Results of the 1869–70 New South Wales colonial election =

Colonial election for New South Wales, Australia in 1869-70

New South Wales colonial election, 3 December 1869 – 10 January 1870 Legislative Assembly << 1864–65–1872 >>
Enrolled voters	124,433				
Votes cast	87,137		Turnout	53.70 (Note: There were 11 uncontested districts and turnout is based on the roll of 103,795 for the contested districts.)	+2.30
Informal votes	226		Informal	0.41	+0.05
Summary of votes by party
Party	Primary votes	%	Swing	Seats	Change
Total	87,137			72	

The 1869–70 New South Wales colonial election was for 72 members representing 60 electoral districts. The election was conducted on the basis of a simple majority or first-past-the-post voting system. In this election there were 8 multi-member districts returning 20 members and 52 single member districts. In the multi-member districts each elector could vote for as many candidates as there were vacancies. 11 districts were uncontested.

There were three districts that did not have a residential or property qualification, Goldfields North (850), Goldfields South (2,240) and Goldfields West (6,000). The average number of enrolled voters per seat in the other districts was 1,649 ranging from The Paterson (583) to The Lachlan (3,857). The electoral boundaries were established under the Electoral Act 1858 (NSW).

== Election results ==
=== Argyle ===
1869–70 New South Wales colonial election: Argyle Friday 17 December 1869
Candidate	Votes	%
Edward Butler (elected)	unopposed	

=== Balranald ===
1869–70 New South Wales colonial election: Balranald Wednesday 5 January 1870
Candidate	Votes	%
Joseph Phelps (re-elected)	unopposed	

=== Bathurst ===
1869–70 New South Wales colonial election: Bathurst Wednesday 22 December 1869
Candidate	Votes	%
William Suttor (re-elected)	unopposed	

=== The Bogan ===
1869–70 New South Wales colonial election: The Bogan Wednesday 22 December 1869
Candidate	Votes	%
George Lord (re-elected)	407	64.6
Thomas Manning	205	32.5
John Ardill	18	2.9
Total formal votes	630	100.0
Informal votes	0	0.0
Turnout	631	26.4

=== Braidwood ===
1869–70 New South Wales colonial election: Braidwood Tuesday 14 December 1869
Candidate	Votes	%
Michael Kelly (re-elected)	872	54.8
Edward Greville	625	39.3
George Alley	94	5.9
Total formal votes	1,591	100.0
Informal votes	0	0.0
Turnout	1,648	59.6

=== Camden ===
1869–70 New South Wales colonial election: Camden Tuesday 14 December 1869
Candidate	Votes	%
Arthur Onslow (elected 1)	865	30.8
John Morrice (re-elected 2)	742	26.4
William Sherwin	644	22.9
Simon Belinfante	556	19.8
Total formal votes	2,807	100.0
Informal votes	0	0.0
Turnout	1,497	62.0

=== Canterbury ===
1869–70 New South Wales colonial election: Canterbury Thursday 23 December 1869
Candidate	Votes	%
Montagu Stephen (elected 1)	1,252	26.3
Richard Hill (re-elected 2)	1,219	25.7
John Lucas (defeated)	979	20.6
William Hanson	947	19.9
Thomas Sullivan	339	7.1
W R Templeton	17	0.4
Total formal votes	4,753	100.0
Informal votes	0	0.0
Turnout	2,481	54.7

=== Carcoar ===
1869–70 New South Wales colonial election: Carcoar Thursday 23 December 1869
Candidate	Votes	%
Richard Driver (elected)	unopposed	

=== The Clarence ===
1869–70 New South Wales colonial election: The Clarence Tuesday 14 December 1869
Candidate	Votes	%
Thomas Bawden (elected)	unopposed	

=== Central Cumberland ===
1869–70 New South Wales colonial election: Central Cumberland Tuesday 28 December 1869
Candidate	Votes	%
John Lackey (re-elected 1)	713	29.4
Edward Flood (elected 2)	629	25.9
William Campbell	616	25.4
James Jones	467	19.3
Total formal votes	2,425	100.0
Informal votes	0	0.0
Turnout	1,900	78.6

=== East Macquarie ===
1869–70 New South Wales colonial election: East Macquarie Tuesday 21 December 1869
Candidate	Votes	%
John Suttor (re-elected 1)	513	45.4
William Cummings (re-elected 2)	426	37.7
Samuel Robinson	190	16.8
Total formal votes	1,129	100.0
Informal votes	0	0.0
Turnout	564	24.8

=== East Maitland ===
1869–70 New South Wales colonial election: East Maitland Thursday 16 December 1869
Candidate	Votes	%
Alexander Dodds (re-elected)	270	53.5
Stephen Scholey	235	46.5
Total formal votes	505	96.7
Informal votes	17	3.3
Turnout	522	66.8

=== East Sydney ===
1869–70 New South Wales colonial election: East Sydney Friday 3 December 1869
Candidate	Votes	%
Henry Parkes (re-elected 1)	3,397	16.7
James Martin (re-elected 2)	3,158	15.6
David Buchanan (elected 3)	2,765	13.6
George King (elected 4)	2,702	13.3
Charles Cowper	2,548	12.6
Julian Salomons	2,106	10.4
James Neale (defeated)	2,071	10.2
Robert Hunt	742	3.7
Alexander Steel	699	3.4
William Cover	77	0.4
W Jennett	30	0.2
Total formal votes	20,295	100.0
Informal votes	0	0.0
Turnout	5,701	56.1

=== Eden ===
1869–70 New South Wales colonial election: Eden Tuesday 14 December 1869
Candidate	Votes	%
Henry Clarke (elected)	590	50.5
Daniel Egan (defeated)	578	49.5
Total formal votes	1,168	100.0
Informal votes	0	0.0
Turnout	1,168	72.9

=== The Glebe ===
1869–70 New South Wales colonial election: The Glebe Monday 13 December 1869
Candidate	Votes	%
George Allen (elected)	unopposed	

=== Goldfields North ===
1869–70 New South Wales colonial election: Goldfields North Monday 10 January 1870
Candidate	Votes	%
Robert Wisdom (elected)	212	54.6
William Bourke	145	37.4
Henry Roman	31	8.0
Total formal votes	388	100.0
Informal votes	0	0.0
Turnout	390	45.9

=== Goldfields South ===
1869–70 New South Wales colonial election: Goldfields South Monday 10 January 1870
Candidate	Votes	%
Ezekiel Baker (elected)	476	65.3
George Stephen	253	34.7
Total formal votes	729	100.0
Informal votes	0	0.0
Turnout	729	32.5

=== Goldfields West ===
1869–70 New South Wales colonial election: Goldfields West Monday 10 January 1870
Candidate	Votes	%
Walter Church (re-elected)	814	64.6
Geoffrey Eagar	389	30.9
William Redman	57	4.5
Total formal votes	1,260	100.0
Informal votes	0	0.0
Turnout	1,276	21.3

=== Goulburn ===
1869–70 New South Wales colonial election: Goulburn Tuesday 14 December 1869
Candidate	Votes	%
Maurice Alexander (re-elected)	unopposed	

=== The Gwydir ===
1869–70 New South Wales colonial election: The Gwydir Friday 24 December 1869
Candidate	Votes	%
Thomas Dangar (re-elected)	369	83.1
Edward Sharp	75	16.9
Total formal votes	444	97.4
Informal votes	12	2.6
Turnout	456	29.5

=== Hartley ===
1869–70 New South Wales colonial election: Hartley Thursday 23 December 1869
Candidate	Votes	%
James Neale (elected)	628	77.2
Andrew Brown	179	22.0
John Garsed	7	0.9
Total formal votes	814	100.0
Informal votes	0	0.0
Turnout	814	38.8

=== The Hastings ===
1869–70 New South Wales colonial election: The Hastings Thursday 23 December 1869
Candidate	Votes	%
Horace Dean (elected)	474	32.0
Robert Smith	444	30.0
Henry Flett	307	20.7
William Forster	253	17.1
Geoffrey Eagar	2	0.1
Ebenezer Vickery	1	0.1
Total formal votes	1,481	100.0
Informal votes	0	0.0
Turnout	1,491	56.4

=== The Hawkesbury ===
1869–70 New South Wales colonial election: The Hawkesbury Saturday 18 December 1869
Candidate	Votes	%
Henry Moses (elected 1)	525	36.1
William Piddington (re-elected 2)	445	30.6
James Cunneen (defeated)	406	27.9
James Ascough	73	5.0
W P Wilshire	6	0.4
Total formal votes	1,455	100.0
Informal votes	0	0.0
Turnout	1,021	66.6

=== The Hume ===
1869–70 New South Wales colonial election: The Hume Thursday 23 December 1869
Candidate	Votes	%
James Fallon (elected)	513	57.8
Thomas Mate (defeated)	375	42.2
Total formal votes	888	97.7
Informal votes	21	2.3
Turnout	909	53.3

=== The Hunter ===
1869–70 New South Wales colonial election: The Hunter Wednesday 15 December 1869
Candidate	Votes	%
John Dillon (elected)	319	49.5
John Burns (defeated)	286	44.3
Alfred Boggis	40	6.2
Total formal votes	645	100.0
Informal votes	0	0.0
Turnout	644	57.8

=== Illawarra ===
1869–70 New South Wales colonial election: Illawarra Tuesday 14 December 1869
Candidate	Votes	%
James Osborne (elected)	575	59.2
John Stewart (defeated)	396	40.8
Total formal votes	971	100.0
Informal votes	0	0.0
Turnout	971	68.6

=== Kiama ===
1869–70 New South Wales colonial election: Kiama Tuesday 14 December 1869
Candidate	Votes	%
Henry Parkes (re-elected)	581	57.4
Samuel Gray	432	42.7
Total formal votes	1,013	98.9
Informal votes	11	1.1
Turnout	1,024	79.2

=== The Lachlan ===
1869–70 New South Wales colonial election: The Lachlan Tuesday 28 December 1869
Candidate	Votes	%
James Watson (elected)	974	55.6
William Dalley	767	43.8
William Forster	12	0.7
Total formal votes	1,753	97.3
Informal votes	49	2.7
Turnout	1,802	46.7

=== The Lower Hunter ===
1869–70 New South Wales colonial election: The Lower Hunter Friday 17 December 1869
Candidate	Votes	%
Robert Wisdom (re-elected)	281	51.4
Archibald Jacob	266	48.6
Total formal votes	547	97.7
Informal votes	13	2.3
Turnout	560	78.3

=== Liverpool Plains ===
1869–70 New South Wales colonial election: Liverpool Plains Thursday 23 December 1869
Candidate	Votes	%
Charles Cowper (elected)	468	91.4
Hanley Bennett	44	8.6
Total formal votes	512	100.0
Informal votes	0	0.0
Turnout	512	21.6

=== Monara ===
1869–70 New South Wales colonial election: Monara Tuesday 4 January 1870
Candidate	Votes	%
Daniel Egan (elected)	448	51.6
William Grahame (defeated)	420	48.4
Total formal votes	868	100.0
Informal votes	0	0.0
Turnout	868	54.5

=== Morpeth ===
1869–70 New South Wales colonial election: Morpeth Friday 17 December 1869
Candidate	Votes	%
James Campbell (re-elected)	397	65.3
John Keating	211	34.7
Total formal votes	608	97.6
Informal votes	15	2.4
Turnout	623	75.9

=== Mudgee ===
1869–70 New South Wales colonial election: Mudgee Thursday 16 December 1869
Candidate	Votes	%
Henry Stephen (elected)	760	59.0
Samuel Terry (defeated)	529	41.0
Total formal votes	1,289	100.0
Informal votes	0	0.0
Turnout	1,289	53.8

=== The Murray ===
1869–70 New South Wales colonial election: The Murray Wednesday 29 December 1869
Candidate	Votes	%
Patrick Jennings (elected)	341	87.2
Robert Hunt	50	12.8
Total formal votes	391	100.0
Informal votes	0	0.0
Turnout	391	40.5

=== The Murrumbidgee ===
1869–70 New South Wales colonial election: The Murrumbidgee Monday 20 December 1869
Candidate	Votes	%
William Macleay (re-elected)	unopposed	

=== Narellan ===
1869–70 New South Wales colonial election: Narellan Friday 17 December 1869
Candidate	Votes	%
Joseph Leary (elected)	226	51.6
John Hurley (defeated)	212	48.4
Total formal votes	438	100.0
Informal votes	0	0.0
Turnout	438	68.7

=== The Nepean ===
1869–70 New South Wales colonial election: The Nepean Tuesday 14 December 1869
Candidate	Votes	%
James Ryan (re-elected)	405	59.2
Archibald Thompson	271	39.6
Thomas Shepherd	8	1.2
Total formal votes	684	100.0
Informal votes	0	0.0
Turnout	684	52.5

=== New England ===
1869–70 New South Wales colonial election: New England Thursday 23 December 1869
Candidate	Votes	%
Charles Weaver (elected)	759	59.2
Robert Forster	520	40.6
Alexander Black	3	0.2
Total formal votes	1,282	100.0
Informal votes	0	0.0
Turnout	1,319	58.7

=== Newcastle ===
1869–70 New South Wales colonial election: Newcastle Friday 3 December 1869
Candidate	Votes	%
George Lloyd (elected)	588	53.8
James Martin	505	46.2
Total formal votes	1,093	100.0
Informal votes	0	0.0
Turnout	1,093	76.9

=== Newtown ===
1869–70 New South Wales colonial election: Newtown Friday 10 December 1869
Candidate	Votes	%
Stephen Brown (re-elected)	925	60.4
Patrick Shepherd	606	39.6
Total formal votes	1,531	100.0
Informal votes	0	0.0
Turnout	1,531	63.3

=== Northumberland ===
1869–70 New South Wales colonial election: Northumberland Thursday 9 December 1869
Candidate	Votes	%
William Brookes (elected)	760	43.7
Joseph Ward	430	24.7
F Shaw	350	20.1
Francis O'Brien	122	7.0
Charles Cleveland	69	4.0
Samuel Gordon	8	0.5
Total formal votes	1,739	96.9
Informal votes	55	3.1
Turnout	1,794	72.0

=== Orange ===
1869–70 New South Wales colonial election: Orange Friday 17 December 1869
Candidate	Votes	%
Saul Samuel (re-elected)	unopposed	

=== Paddington ===
1869–70 New South Wales colonial election: Paddington Monday 6 December 1869
Candidate	Votes	%
John Sutherland (re-elected)	unopposed	

=== The Paterson ===
1869–70 New South Wales colonial election: The Paterson Wednesday 15 December 1869
Candidate	Votes	%
William Arnold (re-elected)	285	76.2
Herbert Brown	88	23.5
George Townshend	1	0.3
Total formal votes	374	100.0
Informal votes	0	0.0
Turnout	374	64.2

=== Parramatta ===
1869–70 New South Wales colonial election: Parramatta Friday 17 December 1869
Candidate	Votes	%
James Byrnes (re-elected 1)	468	31.9
James Farnell (re-elected 2)	455	31.0
Hugh Taylor	274	18.7
George Oakes	270	18.4
Total formal votes	1,467	100.0
Informal votes	0	0.0
Turnout	900	70.7

=== Patrick's Plains ===
1869–70 New South Wales colonial election: Patrick's Plains Thursday 23 December 1869
Candidate	Votes	%
James Hoskins (re-elected)	482	54.2
Bowie Wilson (defeated)	407	45.8
Total formal votes	889	100.0
Informal votes	0	0.0
Turnout	910	54.9

=== Queanbeyan ===
1869–70 New South Wales colonial election: Queanbeyan Thursday 23 December 1869
Candidate	Votes	%
William Forster (elected)	334	50.7
Charles Campbell	325	49.3
Total formal votes	659	98.5
Informal votes	10	1.5
Turnout	669	63.5

=== Shoalhaven ===
1869–70 New South Wales colonial election: Shoalhaven Tuesday 14 December 1869
Candidate	Votes	%
Thomas Garrett (re-elected)	633	54.4
Samuel Goold	530	45.6
Total formal votes	1,163	99.2
Informal votes	9	0.8
Turnout	1,190	83.0

=== St Leonards ===
1869–70 New South Wales colonial election: St Leonards Monday 20 December 1869
Candidate	Votes	%
William Tunks (re-elected)	752	56.5
William Forster (defeated)	579	43.5
Total formal votes	1,331	100.0
Informal votes	0	0.0
Turnout	1,331	67.0

=== Tenterfield ===
1869–70 New South Wales colonial election: Tenterfield Thursday 23 December 1869
Candidate	Votes	%
Colin Fraser (elected)	397	43.2
Robert Abbott	308	33.5
James Williamson	215	23.4
Total formal votes	920	100.0
Informal votes	0	0.0
Turnout	920	55.7

=== The Tumut ===
1869–70 New South Wales colonial election: The Tumut Wednesday 22 December 1869
Candidate	Votes	%
Edward Brown (re-elected)	513	61.4
Robert Lynch	321	38.4
J T V Walker	2	0.2
Total formal votes	836	100.0
Informal votes	0	0.0
Turnout	836	68.2

=== The Upper Hunter ===
1869–70 New South Wales colonial election: The Upper Hunter Thursday 16 December 1869
Candidate	Votes	%
Archibald Bell (re-elected)	510	63.2
William Gordon	297	36.8
Total formal votes	807	100.0
Informal votes	0	0.0
Turnout	807	32.4

=== Wellington ===
1869–70 New South Wales colonial election: Wellington Tuesday 28 December 1869
Candidate	Votes	%
Gerald Spring (elected)	238	66.7
Andrew Ross	62	17.4
Charles Blakefield	57	16.0
Total formal votes	357	100.0
Informal votes	0	0.0
Turnout	357	26.5

=== West Macquarie ===
1869–70 New South Wales colonial election: West Macquarie Wednesday 15 December 1869
Candidate	Votes	%
Edmund Webb (elected)	397	57.6
Richard Driver (defeated)	292	42.4
Total formal votes	689	98.0
Informal votes	14	2.0
Turnout	703	74.9

=== West Maitland ===
1869–70 New South Wales colonial election: West Maitland Monday 20 December 1869
Candidate	Votes	%
Benjamin Lee (re-elected)	488	58.6
Andrew Liddell	345	41.4
Total formal votes	833	100.0
Informal votes	0	0.0
Turnout	833	75.2

=== West Sydney ===
1869–70 New South Wales colonial election: West Sydney Thursday 9 December 1869
Candidate	Votes	%
Joseph Wearne (elected 1)	2,977	17.8
John Robertson (re-elected 2)	2,829	17.0
William Windeyer (re-elected 3)	2,739	16.4
William Speer (elected 4)	2,664	16.0
William Campbell (defeated)	2,602	15.6
Geoffrey Eagar (defeated)	2,353	14.1
Alexander Richardson	526	3.2
Total formal votes	16,690	100.0
Informal votes	0	0.0
Turnout	5,172	57.1

=== The Williams ===
1869–70 New South Wales colonial election: The Williams Wednesday 22 December 1869
Candidate	Votes	%
John Nowlan (re-elected)	473	61.0
William Mullen	222	28.7
William Watson	69	8.9
Francis O'Brien	11	1.4
Total formal votes	775	100.0
Informal votes	0	0.0
Turnout	775	64.6

=== Windsor ===
1869–70 New South Wales colonial election: Windsor Wednesday 22 December 1869
Candidate	Votes	%
Arthur Dight (elected)	243	50.9
William Walker (defeated)	234	49.1
Total formal votes	477	100.0
Informal votes	0	0.0
Turnout	477	74.7

=== Wollombi ===
1869–70 New South Wales colonial election: Wollombi Monday 13 December 1869
Candidate	Votes	%
Joseph Eckford (re-elected)	414	55.7
Lyall Scott	330	44.4
Total formal votes	744	100.0
Informal votes	0	0.0
Turnout	743	65.4

=== Yass Plains ===
1869–70 New South Wales colonial election: Yass Plains Friday 24 December 1869
Candidate	Votes	%
Michael Fitzpatrick (elected)	show of hands	
Thomas Laidlaw		

== See also ==
- Candidates of the 1869–70 New South Wales colonial election
- Members of the New South Wales Legislative Assembly, 1869–1872
