= Electoral results for the district of Wollombi =

Election results for Wollombi, New South Wales, Australia

Wollombi, an electoral district of the Legislative Assembly in the Australian state of New South Wales was created in 1859 and abolished in 1894.

Election	Member	Party
1859	William Cape	None
1860 by	Joseph Eckford	None
1860	Joseph Eckford	None
1864	Joseph Eckford	None
1869	Joseph Eckford	None
1870 by	Joseph Eckford	None
1872	James Cunneen	None
1874	James Cunneen	None
1877	Joseph Eckford	None
1880	Joseph Eckford	None
1882	Joseph Gorrick	None
1885	Lyall Scott	None
1886 by	Richard Stevenson	None
1887	Richard Stevenson	Free Trade
1889	Richard Stevenson	Protectionist
1891	Richard Stevenson	Protectionist

== Election results ==
=== Elections in the 1890s ===
==== 1891 ====
1891 New South Wales colonial election: Wollombi Monday 29 June
Party	Candidate	Votes	%	±%
Protectionist	Richard Stevenson (re-elected)	795	72.8	
Free Trade	Joseph Gorrick	297	27.2	
Total formal votes		1,092	98.2	
Informal votes		20	1.8	
Turnout		1,112	46.3	
Protectionist hold				

=== Elections in the 1880s ===
==== 1889 ====
1889 New South Wales colonial election: Wollombi Saturday 9 February
Party	Candidate	Votes	%	±%
Protectionist	Richard Stevenson (elected)	652	64.2	
Free Trade	Fred Walsh	363	35.8	
Total formal votes		1,015	98.5	
Informal votes		16	1.6	
Turnout		1,031	45.7	
Member changed to Protectionist from Free Trade				

==== 1887 ====
1887 New South Wales colonial election: Wollombi Saturday 19 February
Party	Candidate	Votes	%	±%
Free Trade	Richard Stevenson (re-elected)	578	55.5	
Free Trade	George Watt	463	44.5	
Total formal votes		1,041	98.4	
Informal votes		17	1.6	
Turnout		1,058	55.3	

==== 1886 by-election ====
1886 Wollombi by-election Friday 17 December
Candidate	Votes	%
Richard Stevenson (elected)	472	50.9
Walter Vivian	456	49.1
Total formal votes	1,112	100.0
Informal votes	0	0.0
Turnout	1,112	57.0

Lyall Scott resigned.

==== 1885 ====
1885 New South Wales colonial election: Wollombi Saturday 31 October
Candidate	Votes	%
Lyall Scott (elected)	592	62.8
Walter Vivian	257	27.3
George Anderson	69	7.3
A S Jaques	25	2.7
Total formal votes	943	99.0
Informal votes	10	1.1
Turnout	953	57.0

The sitting member Joseph Gorrick unsuccessfully contested Northumberland.

==== 1882 ====
1882 New South Wales colonial election: Wollombi Tuesday 12 December
Candidate	Votes	%
Joseph Gorrick (elected)	437	53.0
Joseph Eckford (defeated)	388	47.0
Total formal votes	825	97.9
Informal votes	18	2.1
Turnout	843	62.6

==== 1880 ====
1880 New South Wales colonial election: Wollombi Wednesday 24 November
Candidate	Votes	%
Joseph Eckford (re-elected)	406	42.3
Joseph Gorrick	328	34.1
Robert Higgins	227	23.6
Total formal votes	961	99.4
Informal votes	6	0.6
Turnout	967	75.1

=== Elections in the 1870s ===
==== 1877 ====
1877 New South Wales colonial election: Wollombi Friday 2 November
Candidate	Votes	%
Joseph Eckford (elected)	237	36.6
Henry Levien	236	36.5
James Cunneen (defeated)	174	26.9
Total formal votes	647	100.0
Informal votes	0	0.0
Turnout	647	60.6

==== 1874 ====
1874–75 New South Wales colonial election: Wollombi Monday 14 December 1874
Candidate	Votes	%
James Cunneen (re-elected)	432	68.3
Joseph Eckford	201	31.8
Total formal votes	633	100.0
Informal votes	0	0.0
Turnout	633	61.6

==== 1872 ====
1872 New South Wales colonial election: Wollombi Wednesday 21 February
Candidate	Votes	%
James Cunneen (elected)	348	55.0
Joseph Eckford (defeated)	285	45.0
Total formal votes	633	100.0
Informal votes	0	0.0
Turnout	633	54.0

==== 1870 by-election ====
1870 Wollombi by-election Monday 19 September
Candidate	Votes	%
Joseph Eckford (re-elected)	365	51.4
James Cunneen	345	48.6
Total formal votes	710	100.0
Informal votes	0	0.0
Turnout	710	59.3

Joseph Eckford was insolvent.

=== Elections in the 1860s ===
==== 1869 ====
1869–70 New South Wales colonial election: Wollombi Monday 13 December 1869
Candidate	Votes	%
Joseph Eckford (re-elected)	414	55.7
Lyall Scott	330	44.4
Total formal votes	744	100.0
Informal votes	0	0.0
Turnout	743	65.4

==== 1864 ====
1864–65 New South Wales colonial election: Wollombi Tuesday 13 December 1864
Candidate	Votes	%
Joseph Eckford (re-elected)	338	53.7
Lyall Scott	292	46.4
Total formal votes	630	100.0
Informal votes	0	0.0
Turnout	630	58.2

==== 1860 ====
1860 New South Wales colonial election: Wollombi Saturday 15 December
Candidate	Votes	%
Joseph Eckford (re-elected)	unopposed	

==== 1860 by-election ====
1860 Wollombi by-election Thursday 17 May
Candidate	Votes	%
Joseph Eckford (elected)	309	56.4
George Simpson	239	43.6
Total formal votes	548	100.0
Informal votes	0	0.0
Turnout	548	58.0

William Cape resigned.

=== Elections in the 1850s ===
==== 1859 ====
1859 New South Wales colonial election: Wollombi Monday 20 June
Candidate	Votes	%
William Cape (elected)	unopposed	
