= Electoral results for the district of The Hastings (New South Wales) =

Election results for Hastings, New South Wales, Australia

The Hastings, an electoral district of the Legislative Assembly in the Australian state of New South Wales was created in 1859 and abolished in 1880.

Election	Member	Party
1859	Henry Flett	None
1860	Henry Flett	None
1864	William Forster	None
1869	Horace Dean	None
1870 by	Horace Dean	None
1870 re-count	Robert Smith	None
1872	Robert Smith	None
1874	Robert Smith	None
1877	Robert Smith	None

== Election results ==
=== Elections in the 1870s ===
==== 1877 ====
1877 New South Wales colonial election: The Hastings Saturday 3 November
Candidate	Votes	%
Robert Smith (re-elected)	1,018	94.2
Thomas Amos	63	5.8
Total formal votes	1,081	100.0
Informal votes	0	0.0
Turnout	1,093	34.5

==== 1874 ====
1874–75 New South Wales colonial election: The Hastings Thursday 24 December 1874
Candidate	Votes	%
Robert Smith (re-elected)	unopposed	

==== 1872 ====
1872 New South Wales colonial election: The Hastings Thursday 29 February
Candidate	Votes	%
Robert Smith (re-elected)	907	47.0
Eugene Fattorini	586	30.4
James Garvan	435	22.6
Total formal votes	1,928	100.0
Informal votes	0	0.0
Turnout	1,928	59.9

==== 1870 re-count ====
1870 The Hastings election re-count Friday 23 September
Candidate	Votes	%
Robert Smith (elected)	N/A	

The Elections and Qualifications Committee conducted a re-count of the 1870 The Hastings by-election and declared that Horace Dean was not qualified to be elected. No by-election was conducted, instead the committee declared that Robert Smith had been elected.

==== 1870 by-election ====
1870 The Hastings by-election Monday 4 July
Candidate	Votes	%
Horace Dean (elected)	953	68.4
Robert Smith	441	31.6
Total formal votes	1,394	100.0
Informal votes	0	0.0
Turnout	1,394	47.5

The Committee of Elections and Qualifications held that the election of Horace Dean was void because he held an office of profit under the crown at the time of his nomination.

=== Elections in the 1860s ===
==== 1869 ====
1869–70 New South Wales colonial election: The Hastings Thursday 23 December 1869
Candidate	Votes	%
Horace Dean (elected)	474	32.0
Robert Smith	444	30.0
Henry Flett	307	20.7
William Forster	253	17.1
Geoffrey Eagar	2	0.1
Ebenezer Vickery	1	0.1
Total formal votes	1,481	100.0
Informal votes	0	0.0
Turnout	1,491	56.4

==== 1864 ====
1864–65 New South Wales colonial election: The Hastings Saturday 24 December 1864
Candidate	Votes	%
William Forster (elected)	530	47.4
Henry Flett (defeated)	328	29.3
Horace Dean	260	23.3
Total formal votes	1,118	100.0
Informal votes	0	0.0
Turnout	1,133	62.4

==== 1860 ====
1860 New South Wales colonial election: The Hastings Friday 21 December
Candidate	Votes	%
Henry Flett (re-elected)	278	53.8
Frederick Panton	191	36.9
Robert Ross	40	7.7
Isaac Aaron	8	1.6
Total formal votes	517	100.0
Informal votes	0	0.0
Turnout	536	32.5

=== Elections in the 1850s ===
==== 1859 ====
1859 New South Wales colonial election: The Hastings Friday 1 July
Candidate	Votes	%
Henry Flett (elected)	321	40.8
J Andrews	278	35.4
Frederick Panton	186	23.7
James McCarthy	1	0.1
Total formal votes	786	100.0
Informal votes	0	0.0
Turnout	786	56.3
