= Electoral results for the district of East Maitland =

Election results for East Maitland, New South Wales, Australia

East Maitland, an electoral district of the Legislative Assembly in the Australian state of New South Wales was created in 1859 and abolished in 1904.

Election	Member	Party affiliation
1859	Joseph Chambers	None
1859 by	James Dickson	None
1860	James Dickson	None
June 1863 by	John Darvall	None
August 1863 by	John Darvall	None
1864	Alexander Dodds	None
1869	Alexander Dodds	None
1872	Stephen Scholey	None
1874	Stephen Scholey	None
1877	Stephen Scholey	None
1878 by	Henry Badgery	None
1880	James Brunker	None
1882	James Brunker	None
1885	James Brunker	None
1887	James Brunker	Free Trade
1889	James Brunker	Free Trade
1891	James Brunker	Free Trade
1894	James Brunker	Free Trade
1895	James Brunker	Free Trade
1898	James Brunker	Free Trade
1901	James Brunker	Liberal Reform

== Election results ==
=== Elections in the 1900s ===
==== 1901 ====
1901 New South Wales state election: East Maitland
Party	Candidate	Votes	%	±%
Liberal Reform	James Brunker	990	67.6	+15.6
Ind. Progressive	William McIlroy	475	32.4	
Total formal votes		1,465	99.7	+0.7
Informal votes		4	0.3	−0.7
Turnout		1,469	69.9	−0.2
Liberal Reform hold				

=== Elections in the 1890s ===
==== 1898 ====
1898 New South Wales colonial election: East Maitland
Party	Candidate	Votes	%	±%
Free Trade	James Brunker	705	52.0	
National Federal	Samuel Clift	650	48.0	
Total formal votes		1,355	99.0	
Informal votes		14	1.0	
Turnout		1,369	70.1	
Free Trade hold				

==== 1895 ====
1895 New South Wales colonial election: East Maitland
Party	Candidate	Votes	%	±%
Free Trade	James Brunker	854	60.5	
Labour	Peter Curran	319	22.6	
Ind. Protectionist	Samuel Clift	238	16.9	
Total formal votes		1,411	99.1	
Informal votes		13	0.9	
Turnout		1,424	80.0	
Free Trade hold				

==== 1894 ====
1894 New South Wales colonial election: East Maitland
Party	Candidate	Votes	%	±%
Free Trade	James Brunker	1,001	69.5	
Labour	Peter Curran	439	30.5	
Total formal votes		1,440	99.0	
Informal votes		14	1.0	
Turnout		1,454	81.0	
Free Trade hold				

==== 1891 ====
1891 New South Wales colonial election: East Maitland Wednesday 17 June
Party	Candidate	Votes	%	±%
Free Trade	James Brunker (re-elected)	632	77.9	
Protectionist	John Rigg	179	22.1	
Total formal votes		811	98.5	
Informal votes		12	1.5	
Turnout		823	62.1	
Free Trade hold				

=== Elections in the 1880s ===
==== 1889 ====
1889 New South Wales colonial election: East Maitland Saturday 2 February
Party	Candidate	Votes	%	±%
Free Trade	James Brunker (elected)	unopposed		
Free Trade hold				

==== 1887 ====
1887 New South Wales colonial election: East Maitland Tuesday 8 February
Party	Candidate	Votes	%	±%
Free Trade	James Brunker (re-elected)	unopposed		

==== 1885 ====
1885 New South Wales colonial election: East Maitland Friday 16 October
Candidate	Votes	%
James Brunker (re-elected)	unopposed	

==== 1882 ====
1882 New South Wales colonial election: East Maitland Wednesday 6 December
Candidate	Votes	%
James Brunker (re-elected)	unopposed	

==== 1880 ====
1880 New South Wales colonial election: East Maitland Wednesday 24 November
Candidate	Votes	%
James Brunker (elected)	unopposed	

The sitting member Henry Badgery successfully contested Monaro.

=== Elections in the 1870s ===
==== 1878 by-election ====
1878 East Maitland by-election Wednesday 5 June
Candidate	Votes	%
Henry Badgery (elected)	302	46.7
Charles Heydon	175	27.1
Joseph Gorrick	169	26.2
Total formal votes	646	98.8
Informal votes	8	1.2
Turnout	654	81.6

Stephen Scholey died.

==== 1877 ====
1877 New South Wales colonial election: East Maitland Wednesday 31 October
Candidate	Votes	%
Stephen Scholey (re-elected)	268	50.2
Alexander Dodds	266	49.8
Total formal votes	534	99.1
Informal votes	5	0.9
Turnout	539	70.2

==== 1874-75 ====
1874–75 New South Wales colonial election: East Maitland Wednesday 16 December 1874
Candidate	Votes	%
Stephen Scholey (re-elected)	252	52.9
Alexander Dodds	221	46.4
Abel Cobcroft	3	0.6
William Miles	0	0.0
Total formal votes	476	94.6
Informal votes	27	5.4
Turnout	503	66.4

==== 1872 ====
1872 New South Wales colonial election: East Maitland Saturday 24 February
Candidate	Votes	%
Stephen Scholey (elected)	316	52.8
Alexander Dodds (defeated)	278	46.4
Archibald Hamilton	5	0.8
Total formal votes	599	98.0
Informal votes	12	2.0
Turnout	611	67.9

=== Elections in the 1860s ===
==== 1869-70 ====
1869–70 New South Wales colonial election: East Maitland Thursday 16 December 1869
Candidate	Votes	%
Alexander Dodds (re-elected)	270	53.5
Stephen Scholey	235	46.5
Total formal votes	505	96.7
Informal votes	17	3.3
Turnout	522	66.8

==== 1864-65 ====
1864–65 New South Wales colonial election: East Maitland Friday 16 December 1864
Candidate	Votes	%
Alexander Dodds (elected)	unopposed	

==== August 1863 by-election ====
August 1863 East Maitland by-election Tuesday 11 August
Candidate	Votes	%
John Darvall (elected)	314	55.2
Henry Parkes	255	44.8
Total formal votes	569	100.0
Informal votes	0	0.0
Turnout	569	74.1

John Darvall had been appointed Attorney General in the third Cowper ministry.

==== June 1863 by-election ====
June 1863 East Maitland by-election Thursday, 18 June
Candidate	Votes	%
John Darvall (elected)	194	50.7
Archibald Hamilton	189	49.4
Total formal votes	383	100.0
Informal votes	0	0.0
Turnout	383	49.9

James Dickson died.

==== 1860 ====
1860 New South Wales colonial election: East Maitland Friday 14 December
Candidate	Votes	%
James Dickson (re-elected)	254	84.1
James Cox	48	15.9
Total formal votes	302	100.0
Informal votes	0	0.0
Turnout	302	35.8

=== Elections in the 1850s ===
==== 1859 by-election ====
1859 East Maitland by-election Thursday 15 September
Candidate	Votes	%
James Dickson (elected)	223	56.6
Peter Faucett	171	43.4
Total formal votes	394	100.0
Informal votes	0	0.0
Turnout	394	70.7

The seat of Joseph Chambers was declared vacant because he had accepted appointment as a Crown Prosecutor at Quarter Sessions.

==== 1859 ====
1859 New South Wales colonial election: East Maitland Saturday 18 June
Candidate	Votes	%
Joseph Chambers (elected)	210	61.6
James Dickson (defeated)	131	38.4
Total formal votes	341	100.0
Informal votes	0	0.0
Turnout	341	61.2
