= 1870 The Hastings colonial by-election =

By-election in New South Wales, Australia

A by-election was held for the New South Wales Legislative Assembly electorate of The Hastings on 4 July 1870 as a result of the Legislative Assembly declaring the election of Horace Dean was void. Dean had been appointed the postmaster at Tinonee at the time of the nominations for the 1869 election and resigned the following day. The Committee of Elections and Qualifications held that because he had an office of profit under the crown at the time of his nomination meant he was incapable of being elected, or of sitting, or voting, as a member of the Assembly.

== Dates ==
Date	Event
10 December 1869	Nominations for The Hastings
11 December 1869	Horace Dean resigned as postmaster at Tinonee
23 December 1869	Horace Dean elected at the 1869 election.
21 February 1870	Petition lodged by Robert Smith with a £100 deposit.
24 February 1870	Question referred to the Committee of Elections and Qualifications.
6 May 1870	Report of the Committee of Elections and Qualifications was tabled and seat declared vacant.
9 May 1870	Writ of election issued by the Speaker of the Legislative Assembly.
9 May 1870	Horace Dean naturalised as a British subject.
13 June 1870	Nominations
4 July 1870	Polling day
31 August 1870	Return of writ

== Committee of Elections and Qualifications ==
The petition lodged by Smith raised two substantive allegations, that (1) Dean was an alien, being someone who was neither a natural born subject nor a naturalized subject and (2) at the time of his nomination and election Dean was the postmaster at Tinonee, an office of profit under the Crown.

The Electoral Act of 1858 distinguished between a natural born subject, a "person born in Her Majesty's dominions or either of whose parents was so born", and a naturalised subject, a "person who in England is or shall be naturalized and every person made a denizen or having received a certificate" under the Aliens Act 1847 (NSW) and taken the required oath. The qualification to be a member was in section 8 which provided that:

8. Every male subject of Her Majesty of the full age of twenty-one years and absolutely free being natural born or who being a naturalized subject shall have resided in this Colony for five years shall be qualified to be elected a Member of the Assembly for any Electoral District unless disqualified by section seventeen or eighteen of the Constitution Act or unless under section eleven or twelve of this Act he would be disqualified or incapacitated as an Elector.

The relevant disqualifying clause was section eighteen of the Constitution Act which provided:

XVIII. Any person holding any Office of Profit under the Crown, or having a Pension from the Crown during Pleasure or for Term of Years, shall be incapable of being elected, or of sitting or voting as a Member of the Legislative Assembly, unless he be One of the following official Members of the Government, that is to say, the Colonial Secretary, Colonial Treasurer, Auditor General, Attorney General, and Solicitor General, or One of such additional Officers, not being more than Five, as the Governor, with the advice of the Executive Council, may from Time to Time, by a notice in the Government Gazette, declare capable of being elected a Member of the said Assembly.

The committee consisted of Stephen Brown, Alexander DoddsAlexander Dodds, Thomas Garrett, John Lackey, William Macleay, William Piddington and William Windeyer. Dean had been born in the United States of America and his naturalisation in South Australia had previously been held to be invalid as based on forged documents. There did not appear to be any doubt that being a postmaster was an office of profit under the Crown and that Dean had resigned after the nomination. The question was therefore whether the disqualification applied at the time of nomination or only at the time of the polling. The final issue was whether the seat should be awarded to Smith, who finished 2nd of the 6 candidates, or if the seat should be declared vacant and a by-election held.

In the committee Windeyer moved that the election of Dean was void because he was an alien and the seat should be awarded to Smith, however this was defeated by 4 votes to 3. (Note: Brown, Dodds, Lackey, Macleay. Piddington and Windeyer voted in favour, Garrett against.) The report does not identify whether they disagreed that Dean was an alien or whether the seat should be awarded to Smith without a by-election. The committee then resolved, by 6 to 1, (Note: Lackey, Piddington and Windeyer voted in favour, Brown, Dodds, Garrett and Macleay against.) that the seat be declared vacant because Dean held an office of profit under the crown at the time of his nomination. The issue of whether Dean was an alien arose again as the central issue in the subsequent re-count.

== Candidates ==
- Horace Dean had an uncertain history, with a number of claims subsequently disproved. In 1857 he was twice elected to the South Australian House of Assembly but was unseated by the Court of Disputed returns on each occasion, because his naturalisation was invalid as it was based on forged papers. In 1858 he had settled in Tinonee running a store and started the Manning River News. He had been a candidate for the 1864 election for the Hastings but had polled only 23.3% of the vote. Dean said at his nomination that he had obtained a certificate of naturalisation as an additional security to ensure he could not be disqualified on that ground. He called on the voters to return him by a large majority so that the unanimous will of an outraged people would be heard.
- Robert Smith was a Sydney solicitor. At the nomination Smith focused almost entirely upon the ineligibility of Dean, relying upon legal opinions given by Sir James Martin, Sir William Manning and Joseph Innes. He was interrupted throughout his speech. Smith did not appear to campaign in the region, instead returning to Sydney by paddle steamer.

== Result ==
1870 The Hastings by-election Monday 4 July
Candidate	Votes	%
Horace Dean (elected)	953	68.4
Robert Smith	441	31.6
Total formal votes	1,394	100.0
Informal votes	0	0.0
Turnout	1,394	47.5

Dean's margin over Smith increased from 30 votes at the 1869 election to 512 votes.

== See also ==
- Electoral results for the district of The Hastings (New South Wales)
- List of New South Wales state by-elections
