= 1860 Windsor colonial by-election =

By-election in New South Wales, Australia

A by-election was held for the New South Wales Legislative Assembly electorate of Windsor on 12 March 1860 because of the resignation of William Dalley.

== Dates ==
Date	Event
25 February 1860	William Dalley resigned.
29 February 1860	Writ of election issued by the Speaker of the Legislative Assembly.
9 March 1860	Nominations
12 March 1860	Polling day
15 March 1860	Return of writ

== Candidates ==
- Dr Julius Berncastle was a surgeon who specialised in the treatment of eyes (oculist) and ears (aurist). He had stood as a candidate at the 1860 election for West Sydney but had attracted less than 1% of the vote.
- William Walker was a solicitor and member of the Anti-Transportation League who had campaigned for John Darvall at the 1856 election for Cumberland North Riding and for Thomas Smith at the 1857 Cumberland North Riding by-election.

== Result ==
1860 Windsor by-election Monday 12 March
Candidate	Votes	%
William Walker (elected)	264	70.8
Julius Berncastle	102	29.2
Total formal votes	373	100.0
Informal votes	0	0.0
Turnout	373	59.6

== See also ==
- Electoral results for the district of Windsor (New South Wales)
- List of New South Wales state by-elections
