= 1870 The Hastings colonial election re-count =

By-election in New South Wales, Australia

In October 1870 the Committee of Elections and Qualifications conducted a re-count of the 1870 The Hastings by-election, in which Horace Dean had been declared elected over Robert Smith. The Committee declared that Horace Dean was not qualified to be a member and that Robert Smith had been elected.

== Dates ==
Date	Event
23 December 1869	Horace Dean elected at the 1869 election.
21 February 1870	Petition lodged by Robert Smith with a £100 deposit.
6 May 1870	Report of the Committee of Elections and Qualifications was tabled and seat declared vacant.
13 June 1870	Nominations
4 July 1870	Polling day
11 August 1870	2nd Petition lodged by Robert Smith.
18 August 1870	Petition referred to the Elections and Qualifications Committee.
23 September 1870	Elections and Qualifications Committee declared that Robert Smith had been elected.

== Committee of Elections and Qualifications ==
The 1870 by-election had been held because the Committee had previously set aside Dean's election at the 1869 election because Dean held an office of profit under the crown at the time of his nomination, being the postmaster at Tinonee. The Committee declined to hold that Dean ineligible to sit as an alien. Smith had based his re-election nomination on the basis that Dean was ineligible to be elected as he had not been a resident for 5 years after naturalisation, relying upon legal opinions given by Sir James Martin, Sir William Manning and Joseph Innes.

The Electoral Act of 1858 distinguished between a natural born subject, a "person born in Her Majesty's dominions or either of whose parents was so born", and a naturalised subject, a "person who in England is or shall be naturalized and every person made a denizen or having received a certificate" under the Aliens Act 1847 (NSW) and taken the required oath. The qualification to be a member was in section 8 which provided that:

8. Every male subject of Her Majesty of the full age of twenty-one years and absolutely free being natural born or who being a naturalized subject shall have resided in this Colony for five years shall be qualified to be elected a Member of the Assembly for any Electoral District unless disqualified by section seventeen or eighteen of the Constitution Act or unless under section eleven or twelve of this Act he would be disqualified or incapacitated as an Elector. emphasis added

Dean had been a resident of the colony at Tinonee for more than 10 years and by the time the writ was issued for the by-election Dean had received a certificate that he was naturalised. The petition lodged by Smith raised one substantive allegation, that Dean was a naturalized subject who had not resided in the Colony for five years after naturalization. The issue to be decided by the petition was whether the requirement for residence for five years was independent of naturalisation as Dean contended, or five years after naturalisation as Smith contended.

The Committee agreed with Smith's construction of the Electoral Act that the 5 year residence requirement applied after naturalisation and declared that Horace Dean was not qualified to be a member and that as a consequence Robert Smith had been elected.

== Result ==
1870 The Hastings election re-count Friday 23 September
Candidate	Votes	%
Robert Smith (elected)	N/A	

== Aftermath ==
In the Legislative Assembly Charles Cowper, the Premier and Colonial Secretary disagreed with the finding of the Committee that Mr Dean was not qualified and sought to have the Assembly declare that the seat for the Hastings was vacant with a fresh by-election to be called. The vote however was lost by 27 to 23.

Despite the animosity apparent in the election, Smith was returned as the member for the Hastings until 1880.

== See also ==
- Electoral results for the district of The Hastings (New South Wales)
- List of New South Wales state by-elections
