= Electoral results for the district of Windsor (New South Wales) =

Election results for Windsor, New South Wales, Australia

Windsor, an electoral district of the Legislative Assembly in the Australian state of New South Wales was created in 1859 and abolished in 1880.

Election	Member	Party
1859	William Dalley	None
1860 by	William Walker	None
1860	William Walker	None
1864	William Walker	None
1869	Arthur Dight	None
1872	Richard Driver	None
1874	Richard Driver	None
1877	Richard Driver	None
1880 by	Henry McQuade	None

== Election results ==
=== Elections in the 1880s ===
==== 1880 by-election ====
1880 Windsor by-election Thursday 29 July
Candidate	Votes	%
Henry McQuade (elected)	329	67.3
William Walker	160	32.7
Total formal votes	489	100.0
Informal votes	0	0.0
Turnout	489	77.7

Richard Driver died.

=== Elections in the 1870s ===
==== 1877 ====
1877 New South Wales colonial election: Windsor Thursday 1 November
Candidate	Votes	%
Richard Driver (re-elected)	327	72.2
Charles Cansdell	126	27.8
Total formal votes	453	100.0
Informal votes	0	0.0
Turnout	453	74.0

==== 1874 ====
1874–75 New South Wales colonial election: Windsor Wednesday 16 December 1874
Candidate	Votes	%
Richard Driver (re-elected)	255	57.6
William Walker	188	42.4
Total formal votes	443	100.0
Informal votes	0	0.0
Turnout	443	80.0

==== 1872 ====
1872 New South Wales colonial election: Windsor Tuesday 20 February
Candidate	Votes	%
Richard Driver (re-elected)	241	50.7
William Walker	234	49.3
Total formal votes	475	100.0
Informal votes	0	0.0
Turnout	480	77.9

=== Elections in the 1860s ===
==== 1869 ====
1869–70 New South Wales colonial election: Windsor Wednesday 22 December 1869
Candidate	Votes	%
Arthur Dight (elected)	243	50.9
William Walker (defeated)	234	49.1
Total formal votes	477	100.0
Informal votes	0	0.0
Turnout	477	74.7

==== 1864 ====
1864–65 New South Wales colonial election: Windsor Thursday 24 November 1864
Candidate	Votes	%
William Walker (re-elected)	228	50.9
George Pitt	220	49.1
Total formal votes	448	100.0
Informal votes	0	0.0
Turnout	450	68.8

==== 1860 ====
1860 New South Wales colonial election: Windsor Saturday 22 December
Candidate	Votes	%
William Walker (re-elected)	220	52.6
James Byrnes	198	47.4
Total formal votes	418	100.0
Informal votes	0	0.0
Turnout	418	65.6

==== 1860 by-election ====
1860 Windsor by-election Monday 12 March
Candidate	Votes	%
William Walker (elected)	264	70.8
Julius Berncastle	102	29.2
Total formal votes	373	100.0
Informal votes	0	0.0
Turnout	373	59.6

William Dalley resigned.

=== Elections in the 1850s ===
==== 1859 ====
1859 New South Wales colonial election: Windsor Tuesday 21 June
Candidate	Votes	%
William Dalley (re-elected)	276	66.2
Robert Ross	141	33.8
Total formal votes	417	100.0
Informal votes	0	0.0
Turnout	417	66.6
