= 1878 East Maitland colonial by-election =

By-election in New South Wales, Australia

A by-election was held for the New South Wales Legislative Assembly electorate of East Maitland on 5 June 1878 because of the death of Stephen Scholey.

== Dates ==
Date	Event
13 May 1878	Stephen Scholey died.
16 May 1878	Writ of election issued by the Speaker of the Legislative Assembly.
4 June 1878	Nominations
5 June 1878	Polling day
17 June 1878	Return of writ

== Result ==
1878 East Maitland by-election Wednesday 5 June
Candidate	Votes	%
Henry Badgery (elected)	302	46.7
Charles Heydon	175	27.1
Joseph Gorrick	169	26.2
Total formal votes	646	98.8
Informal votes	8	1.2
Turnout	654	81.6

== See also ==
- Electoral results for the district of East Maitland
- List of New South Wales state by-elections
