= 1870 Wollombi colonial by-election =

By-election in New South Wales, Australia

A by-election was held for the New South Wales Legislative Assembly electorate of Wollombi on 19 September 1870 because Joseph Eckford was insolvent.

== Dates ==
Date	Event
8 July 1870	Joseph Eckford declared insolvent.
19 August 1870	Joseph Eckford's seat of Wollombi was declared vacant.
20 August 1870	Writ of election issued by the Speaker of the Legislative Assembly.
5 September 1870	Nominations
19 September 1870	Polling day
4 October 1870	Return of writ

== Result ==
1870 Wollombi by-election Monday 19 September
Candidate	Votes	%
Joseph Eckford (re-elected)	365	51.4
James Cunneen	345	48.6
Total formal votes	710	100.0
Informal votes	0	0.0
Turnout	710	59.3

== See also ==
- Electoral results for the district of Wollombi
- List of New South Wales state by-elections
