= 1870 Goldfields South colonial by-election =

1870 Goldfields South colonial by-election may refer to:

- 1870 Goldfields South colonial by-election 1 held on 20 June 1870
- 1870 Goldfields South colonial by-election 2 held on 12 December 1870

== See also ==
- List of New South Wales state by-elections
