= 1886 Wollombi colonial by-election =

By-election in New South Wales, Australia

A by-election was held for the New South Wales Legislative Assembly electorate of Wollombi on 17 December 1886 because of the resignation of Lyall Scott due to ill health.

== Dates ==
Date	Event
22 November 1886	Lyall Scott resigned.
25 November 1886	Writ of election issued by the Speaker of the Legislative Assembly.
11 December 1886	Nominations
17 December 1886	Polling day
28 December 1887	Return of writ

== Candidates ==
- Richard Stevenson was a retired journalist who had previously stood unsuccessfully for Grafton and The Clarence.
- Walter Vivian was an estate agent from Manly who had contested Wollombi in 1885, defeated by a margin of 335 votes (35.5%).

This was at the emergence of political parties in New South Wales, and both candidates declared their support for free trade.

== Result ==
1886 Wollombi by-election Friday 17 December
Candidate	Votes	%
Richard Stevenson (elected)	472	50.9
Walter Vivian	456	49.1
Total formal votes	1,112	100.0
Informal votes	0	0.0
Turnout	1,112	57.0

== See also ==
- Electoral results for the district of Wollombi
- List of New South Wales state by-elections
