= Walter Lamb =

Walter Lamb may refer to:

- Walter Lamb (politician) (1825–1906), Australian politician, businessman and banker
- Sir Walter Lamb (classicist) (1882–1961), British classical lecturer, author and translator
- Walt Lamb (1920–1991), American football player
- Wally Lamb (born 1950), American author

== See also ==
- Walter Lambe (c. 1450–c. 1504), English composer
