= James Brunker =

Australian politician (1832–1910)

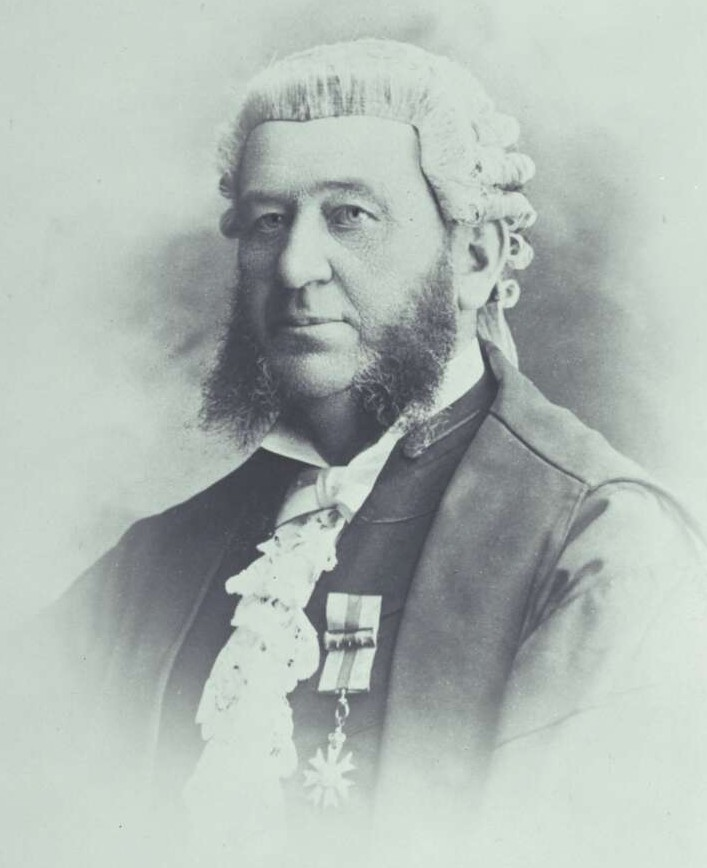
James Brunker at the 1898 Australasian Federal Convention.

James Nixon Brunker (28 April 1832 – 5 June 1910) was an Australian politician, Minister of Lands in the Parliament of New South Wales.

== Early life and business ==
Brunker was born in Port Macquarie, New South Wales, Australia. He was the son of John Nixon Brunker, a wine and spirit merchant, and his wife Mary Ann, née McGreavy. He commenced articles as a solicitor's clerk, but did not complete them. In 1851, moving to Maitland in 1851 where he established a butchery. The same year he married Elizabeth Hewlett née Weiss and they would have 10 children. In 1856 he became a stock and station agent, which in 1870 became a partnership with Henry Badgery and J E Wolfe, with branches in Newcastle and Sydney. The partnership dissolved and Brunker retained the Maitland business.

== Political career ==
Brunker was elected one of the inaugural aldermen of the Municipality of East Maitland in 1862. He was an active supporter of Henry Parkes, nominating Parkes at the 1863 East Maitland by-election, and organising campaign meetings. His business partner Badgery was elected to represent East Maitland at the 1878 East Maitland by-election. Badgery successfully contested the 1880 election for Monaro and Brunker was elected unopposed to replace him as the member for East Maitland, joining Parkes' Free Trade Party in 1887. He was re-elected unopposed throughout the 1880s and held the seat until 16 July 1904. East Maitland was abolished as a result of the 1903 re-distribution following the 1903 New South Wales referendum, and Brunker stood as the Liberal Reform Party candidate for the new district of Maitland which had largely absorbed East Maitland and West Maitland, but was defeated. On 12 June 1905 Brunker was appointed to the New South Wales Legislative Council and served until his resignation on 26 June 1909.

Brunker was appointed Secretary for Lands in the fourth Parkes ministry in August 1888, and again in the fifth Parkes ministry, retiring with his colleagues in October 1891. He was Colonial Secretary in the Reid ministry from 3 August 1894 to 13 September 1899, and acting Premier during Reid's absence in England.

== Later life and death ==
Brunker was bankrupted in 1908 with his occupation listed as auctioneer. He had a lengthy illness prior to his death in Maitland, New South Wales on 5 June 1910 (aged 78), survived by his wife Elizabeth, a daughter, Mary Ann Elizabeth and four sons, James Henry, George William, Arthur Frederick and Ernest Septimus, 34 grandchildren and 2 great grandchildren. The other five children had predeceased him. Elizabeth died on 10 November 1916 (aged 88).

Parliament of New South Wales
Political offices
Preceded by Sir Henry Parkes	Secretary for Lands; August 1888 – January 1889	Succeeded by William Lyne
Preceded by William Lyne	Secretary for Lands; March 1889 – October 1891	Succeeded by Henry Copeland
Preceded by Sir George Dibbs	Colonial Secretary; August 1894 – September 1899	Succeeded by John See
New South Wales Legislative Assembly
Preceded by Henry Badgery	Member for East Maitland; 1880–1904	District abolished
