= August 1863 East Maitland colonial by-election =

By-election in New South Wales, Australia

A by-election was held for the New South Wales Legislative Assembly electorate of East Maitland on 11 August 1863 because John Darvall QC had been appointed Attorney General in the third Cowper ministry. Such ministerial by-elections were usually uncontested however on this occasion the appointment of Darvall was controversial, not only was he a conservative appointed to the liberal ministry, but because John Hargrave, who had been Attorney General since March 1860, accepted the lesser role of Solicitor General to allow Darvall to be appointed.

== Dates ==
Date	Event
31 July 1863	Writ of election issued by the Speaker of the Legislative Assembly.
1 August 1863	John Darvall appointed Attorney General.
10 August 1863	Nominations.
11 August 1863	Polling day
15 August 1863	Return of writ

== Campaign ==
Darvall was challenged by his friend Henry Parkes who denounced the appointment as an unprincipled alliance. Darvall strongly criticised Parkes at the nomination, saying Parkes was voting against a ministry as liberal as himself to embarrass the government and that while he had traveled to England on his own money, Parkes had traveled there on public money, "enjoying his pleasure at your expense and seemed quite renovated from the effects of ease and comfort, and of the exceedingly good society into which he had found his way". Further Parkes' failure in business had ruined his creditors and caused his best friend, James Wilshire, to die of a broken heart. Parkes responded with similar personal attacks, recounting Darvall's opposition to Cowper and accusing Darvall of accepting the position as Attorney General because he had aspirations of being appointed Chief Justice to replace Sir Alfred Stephen.

== Result ==
August 1863 East Maitland by-election Tuesday 11 August
Candidate	Votes	%
John Darvall (elected)	314	55.2
Henry Parkes	255	44.8
Total formal votes	569	100.0
Informal votes	0	0.0
Turnout	569	74.1

== Aftermath ==
Following the declaration of the poll, Parkes said that his election expenses did not exceed £28 and that Darvall "had gone with his friends to solicit votes with the electoral roll in the right hand and the grog bottle in the left".

Six days after the appointment of Darvall QC as Attorney General, Harvgrave, who had stepped down to permit the appointment, was himself made Queen's Counsel.

== See also ==
- Electoral results for the district of East Maitland
- List of New South Wales state by-elections
