= Edward Lamb (politician) =

Australian politician

The Honourable Edward Lamb
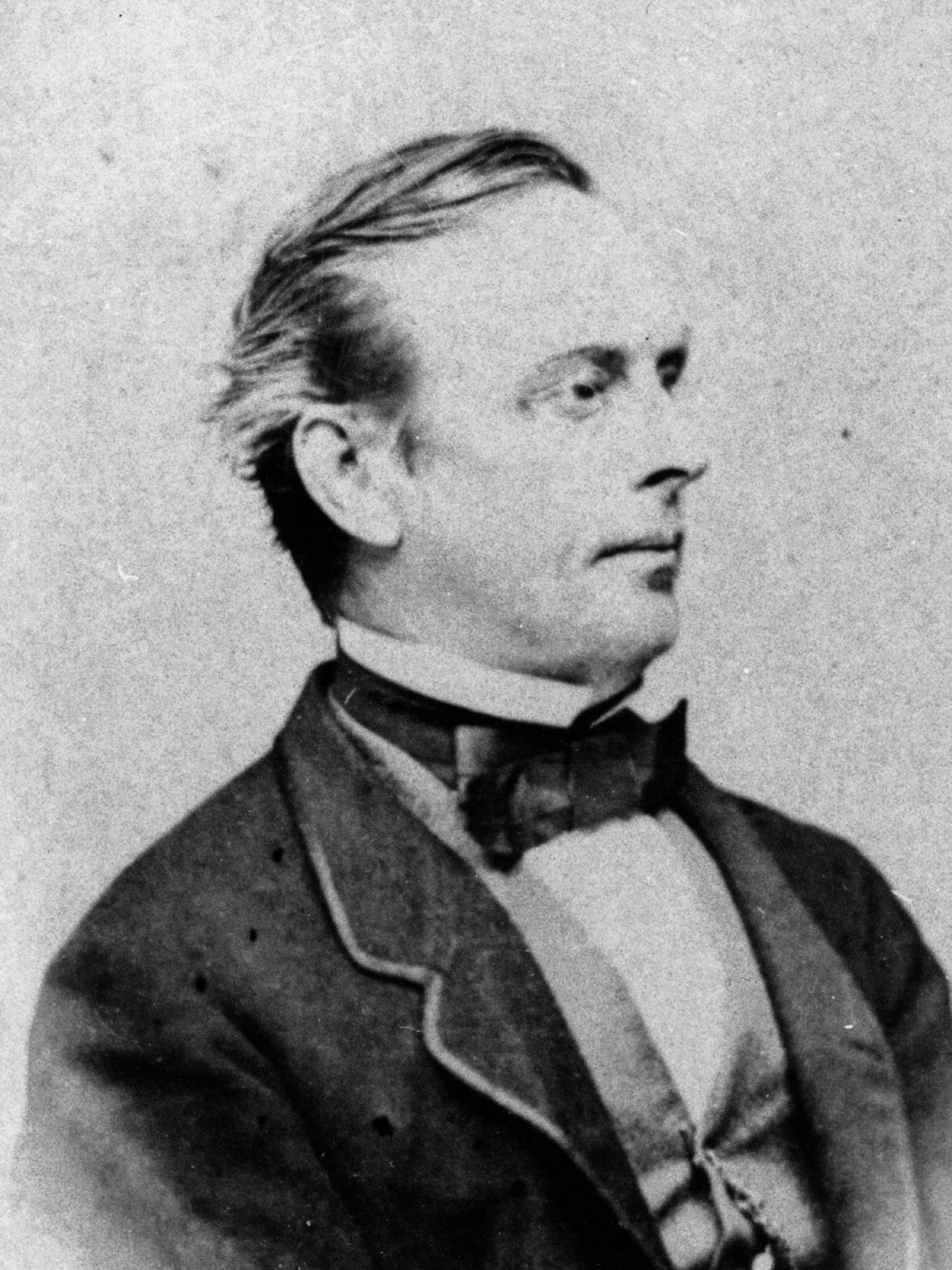

Member of the Queensland Legislative Assembly for Mitchell
- In office 4 January 1867 – 3 December 1869
- Preceded by: Theodore Harden
- Succeeded by: Archibald Buchanan

Personal details
- Born: Edward William Lamb; 6 February 1828 London, England
- Died: 18 October 1910 (aged 82) Sydney, New South Wales, Australia
- Resting place: Waverley Cemetery
- Citizenship: Australia
- Party: Free Trade
- Spouse: Julia (née Fattorini)
- Relations: Thomas Smith (brother-in-law)
- Parent: John Lamb (father)
- Relatives: Alfred Lamb (brother); Walter Lamb (brother); Gubby Allen (grandson)

Edward William Lamb, MLA (6 February 1828 – 18 October 1910) was an Australian politician, businessman and banker. In 1867, he was elected to the Legislative Assembly of Queensland for Mitchell and was Queensland's Secretary for Public Lands from 1867 to 1868. A member of the Lamb banking family, he became a director of the Commercial Banking Company of Sydney (now National Australia Bank).

== Biography ==
He was born in London to the English-born Australian politician John Lamb, who was a commander of the Royal Navy, and Emma Trant. His mother was the daughter John Robinson of Holloway, who was the deputy chairman of Lloyds Bank. His father Commander John Lamb was the chairman of the Commercial Banking Company of Sydney (now National Australia Bank), of which he and his brothers Alfred Lamb, Walter Lamb and John de Villiers Lamb were directors. His sister-in-law by John de Villiers Lamb, Henrietta Lamb (née Smith), was the sister of Thomas Smith, who was the deputy chairman of the Commercial Banking Company of Sydney, and who was the nephew of Henry Smith, who was the chairman of the Commercial Banking Company of Sydney. Thomas Smith was further a brother-in-law of Australian politician John Street, patriarch of the Street family. Lamb's family migrated to Sydney in 1829, and, after his education, Lamb became a clerk in his father's mercantile firm and later became a partner.

Lamb was a member of the Legislative Assembly of Queensland for Mitchell, and Secretary for Public Lands in the administration of Sir Robert Mackenzie, 10th Baronet, from 15 August 1867 to 10 September 1868. In this capacity he passed the Crown Lands Alienation Act. Lamb died in Sydney on 18 October 1910.

Parliament of Queensland
Preceded by Theodore Harden	Member for Mitchell; 1867 - 1869	Succeeded by Archibald Buchanan
