= Electoral results for the district of Goldfields South =

Election results for Goldfields South, New South Wales, Australia

Goldfields South, an electoral district of the Legislative Assembly in the Australian state of New South Wales was created in 1859 and abolished in 1880.

Election	Member	Party
1859	Bowie Wilson	None
1860	Bowie Wilson	None
1863 by	Bowie Wilson	None
1865	James Rodd	None
1870	Ezekiel Baker	None
June 1870 by	Ezekiel Baker	None
December 1870 by	Ezekiel Baker	None
1872	Ezekiel Baker	None
1875	Ezekiel Baker	None
1877	Ezekiel Baker	None

== Election results ==
=== Elections in the 1870s ===
==== 1877 ====
1877 New South Wales colonial election: Goldfields South Monday 12 November
Candidate	Votes	%
Ezekiel Baker (re-elected)	unopposed	

==== 1875 ====
1874–75 New South Wales colonial election: Goldfields South Monday 11 January 1875
Candidate	Votes	%
Ezekiel Baker (re-elected)	381	58.2
Henry Copeland	274	41.8
Total formal votes	655	100.0
Informal votes	0	0.0
Turnout	655	46.8

==== 1872 ====
1872 New South Wales colonial election: Goldfields South Monday 25 March
Candidate	Votes	%
Ezekiel Baker (re-elected)	441	80.8
William Bedall	105	19.2
Total formal votes	546	100.0
Informal votes	0	0.0
Turnout	553	22.1

=== Elections in the 1860s ===
==== December 1870 by-election ====
1870 Goldfields South by-election Monday 12 December
Candidate	Votes	%
Ezekiel Baker (elected)	1,054	79.9
George Stephen	265	20.1
Total formal votes	1,319	100.0
Informal votes	0	0.0
Turnout	1,319	66.0

The Committee of Elections and Qualifications held that the appointment of Ezekiel Baker to conduct a Royal Commission into the goldfields meant that he held an office of profit under the crown and his election was declared void.

==== June 1870 by-election ====
1870 Goldfields South by-election Monday 20 June
Candidate	Votes	%
Ezekiel Baker (re-elected)	unopposed	

The by-election was caused by the resignation of Ezekiel Baker.

==== 1870 ====
1869–70 New South Wales colonial election: Goldfields South Monday 10 January 1870
Candidate	Votes	%
Ezekiel Baker (elected)	476	65.3
George Stephen	253	34.7
Total formal votes	729	100.0
Informal votes	0	0.0
Turnout	729	32.5

==== 1865 ====
1864–65 New South Wales colonial election: Goldfields South Tuesday 10 January 1865
Candidate	Votes	%
James Rodd (elected)	276	49.1
Daniel Dalgleish	264	47.0
T R Browne	22	3.9
Total formal votes	562	100.0
Informal votes	0	0.0
Turnout	561	15.1

==== 1863 by-election ====
1863 Goldfields South by-election Monday 16 November
Candidate	Votes	%
Bowie Wilson (elected)	921	91.3
Frederick Cooper	88	8.7
Total formal votes	1,009	100.0
Informal votes	0	0.0
Turnout	1,009	17.1

Bowie Wilson was appointed Secretary for Lands in the first Martin ministry.

==== 1860 ====
1860 New South Wales colonial election: Goldfields South Wednesday 19 December
Candidate	Votes	%
Bowie Wilson (re-elected)	unopposed	

=== Elections in the 1850s ===
==== 1859 ====
1859 New South Wales colonial election: Goldfields South Wednesday 6 July
Candidate	Votes	%
Bowie Wilson (elected)	374	73.9
John Egan	132	26.1
Total formal votes	506	100.0
Informal votes	0	0.0
Turnout	506	N/A
