= John Lamb (Australian politician) =

Australian politician

Commander John Lamb
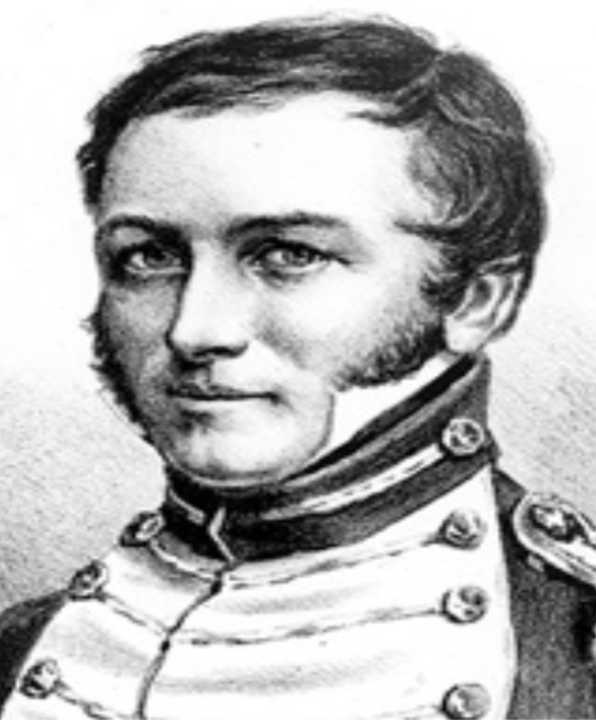

Member of Legislative Council of New South Wales
- In office 10 September 1844 – 2 February 1853

Personal details
- Born: 1 January 1790 Penrith, England
- Died: 17 January 1862 (aged 71–72) Darlinghurst, Sydney
- Citizenship: Australia
- Party: Free Trade
- Spouse: Emma (née Robinson)
- Relations: Thomas Smith
- Children: Walter Lamb; Edward Lamb; Alfred Lamb

John Lamb (1790 – 17 January 1862) was an English-born Australian politician, naval commander and banker. The son of Captain Edward Lamb of the East India Company and Eliza Buchanan, Lamb was appointed to the New South Wales Legislative Council on 10 September 1844. He had a distinguished career with the Royal Navy, beginning at age 11 on his uncle Captain William Buchanan's British Navy warship, the Leviathan. Lamb was noted for his role in several feats over the French and accepted the rank of retired naval commander in May 1846.

Lamb was the chairman of the Commercial Banking Company of Sydney (now National Australia Bank), of which his sons Walter Lamb, Alfred Lamb, Edward Lamb and John de Villiers Lamb were directors, and of which his daughter-in-law Henrietta Lamb's brother Thomas Smith was the deputy chairman, and of which the uncle of his daughter-in-law's brother Henry Smith was chairman, and his wife Emma Trant was the daughter of the deputy chairman of Lloyds Bank.

== Biography ==
He was born in Penrith, England, the son of Captain Edward Lamb of the East India Company and Eliza Buchanan. At the age of 11, he joined the Royal Navy as a midshipman, and he rose to the rank of lieutenant by 1808.

With a grant from the Royal Navy's Patriotic Fund for distinguished service, Commander Lamb and his Buchanan cousins formed the merchant banking house of Lamb, Buchanan & Co. He was in charge of convict transport and merchant ships between 1815 and 1828. In March 1823, he married Emma Trant, the daughter of John Robinson of Holloway, who was the deputy chairman of Lloyds Bank, and Lamb had fourteen children by her.

He settled in Sydney in 1829, and ran a woollen brokers and shipping agents merchant banking firm. He was a strong opponent of continued convict transportation and a member of the Anti-Transportation League. He was chosen by Governor William Bligh to transport him to New South Wales.

Lamb's partnership with Buchanan ended in 1834 and he renewed his merchant banking business as Lamb & Co. He became a director of many large public companies, including the Sydney Alliance Assurance Co., the Australian Fire and Life Assurance Co. and the Sydney Railroad Co. He was a director and several times chairman of the Commercial Banking Co. of Sydney in 1834–50. In 1851-52, he was a founder and first chairman of the Sydney Chamber of Commerce and of the Sydney Exchange Co.

He was appointed to the New South Wales Legislative Council on 10 September 1844. In 1851, the number of members in the Council was increased from to 54, 18 to be appointed and 36 elected. At the 1851 New South Wales colonial election, Lamb was elected as one of three members for the City of Sydney. He resigned in February 1853. He was again appointed to the Legislative Council in July 1857, for the balance of a five-year term ending on 10 May 1861.

His sons were the politicians Walter Lamb, Alfred Lamb, Edward Lamb, and the banker John de Villiers Lamb, all of whom were directors of the Commercial Banking Company of Sydney (now National Australia Bank). His daughter-in-law by John de Villiers, Henrietta Octavia Lamb, was the sister of Thomas Smith, who was the deputy chairman of the Commercial Banking Company of Sydney, and who was the nephew of Henry Smith, who was the chairman of the Commercial Banking Company of Sydney. Thomas Smith was further a brother-in-law of Australian politician John Street, patriarch of the Street family.

Lamb married Emma Trant, the daughter of John Robinson of Holloway, a London banker and deputy chairman of Lloyds Bank. Lamb died at Darlinghurst on 17 January 1862. He was interred St Judes Cemetery, Randwick, NSW.

New South Wales Legislative Council
Preceded by Robert Lowe	Appointed Member; Sep 1844 – Jun 1851	Council expanded
Preceded by William Wentworth; John Dunmore Lang	City of Sydney; Sep 1851 – Feb 1853; With: William Wentworth; Robert Campbell	Succeeded by William Thurlow
