= Alfred Lamb (Australian politician) =

Australian politician

The Honourable Alfred Lamb

Member of the New South Wales Parliament for West Sydney
- In office 10 September 1889 – 2 February 1890

Personal details
- Born: 28 May 1845 Penrith, England
- Died: 13 October 1890 (aged 45)
- Citizenship: Australia
- Party: Free Trade
- Spouse: Mary (née Brenan)
- Relations: Thomas Smith (brother-in-law)
- Parent: John Lamb (father)
- Relatives: Edward Lamb (brother); Walter Lamb (brother)

Alfred Lamb, MLA (28 May 1845 – 13 October 1890) was an Australian politician, businessman and banker. In 1889, he was elected to the New South Wales Legislative Assembly as a Free Trade member for West Sydney. He served in this office until his death in Potts Point in 1890. A member of the Lamb banking family, he became a director of the Commercial Banking Company of Sydney (now National Australia Bank) in 1860.

== Biography ==
He was born in London to the English-born Australian politician John Lamb, who was a commander of the Royal Navy, and Emma Trant. His mother was the daughter John Robinson of Holloway, who was the deputy chairman of Lloyds Bank. His father Commander John Lamb was the chairman of the Commercial Banking Company of Sydney (now National Australia Bank), of which he and his brothers Walter Lamb, Edward Lamb and John de Villiers Lamb were directors. His sister-in-law by John de Villiers Lamb, Henrietta Lamb (née Smith), was the sister of Thomas Smith, who was the deputy chairman of the Commercial Banking Company of Sydney, and who was the nephew of Henry Smith, who was the chairman of the Commercial Banking Company of Sydney. Thomas Smith was further a brother-in-law of Australian politician John Street, patriarch of the Street family. Lamb's family migrated to Sydney in 1829, and, after his education, Lamb became a clerk in his father's mercantile firm and became a partner in 1847. At 15 he became a clerk in his father's firm and at 22 a partner in Lamb, Spry & Co.

A key figure in the Employers' Union, he was elected to the New South Wales Legislative Assembly in 1889 as a Free Trade member for West Sydney, but he died at Potts Point the following year.

On 25 February 1868, he married Mary Elizabeth Gordon, with whom he had seven children, and a second marriage on 4 May 1881 to Mary Frances Brenan produced a further four children.

New South Wales Legislative Assembly
Preceded by Alexander Kethel; George Merriman	Member for West Sydney; 1889–1890; Served alongside: Francis Abigail, Daniel O'Connor, Thomas Playfair	Succeeded by Adolphus Taylor
