= Walter Lamb (politician) =

Australian businessman, banker and politician

The Honourable Walter Lamb

Member of Legislative Council of New South Wales
- In office 10 September 1889 – 2 February 1893

Personal details
- Born: 1 January 1825 Penrith, England
- Died: 13 November 1906 (aged 81)
- Citizenship: Australia
- Party: Free Trade
- Spouse: Margaret (née Dangar)
- Relations: Thomas Smith (brother-in-law)
- Parent: John Lamb (father)
- Relatives: Edward Lamb (brother); Alfred Lamb (brother)

Walter Lamb, MLC (8 January 1825 – 13 November 1906) was an Australian politician, businessman and banker. In 1889, he was appointed to the New South Wales Legislative Council, where he served until 1893. A member of the Lamb banking family, he became a director of the Commercial Banking Company of Sydney (now National Australia Bank) in 1860. In 1880, he became chairman of the Colonial Sugar Refining Company. He married Margaret Elizabeth Dangar, daughter of Australian explorer Henry Dangar.

== Biography ==
He was born in London to the English-born Australian politician John Lamb, who was a commander of the Royal Navy, and Emma Trant. His mother was the daughter John Robinson of Holloway, who was the deputy chairman of Lloyds Bank. His father Commander John Lamb was the chairman of the Commercial Banking Company of Sydney (now National Australia Bank), of which he and his brothers Alfred Lamb, Edward Lamb and John de Villiers Lamb were directors. His sister-in-law by John de Villiers Lamb, Henrietta Lamb (née Smith), was the sister of Thomas Smith, who was the deputy chairman of the Commercial Banking Company of Sydney, and who was the nephew of Henry Smith, who was the chairman of the Commercial Banking Company of Sydney. Thomas Smith was further a brother-in-law of Australian politician John Street, patriarch of the Street family. Lamb's family migrated to Sydney in 1829, and, after his education, Lamb became a clerk in his father's mercantile firm and became a partner in 1847. At 15, he became a clerk in his father's firm and at 22 a partner in Lamb, Spry & Co.

On his return from a visit to England in February 1857 he, his brother John and Charles Parbury carried on as Lamb, Parbury & Co. In January 1855, Lamb had become an original shareholder and director of the Colonial Sugar Refining Company and in 1880 chairman. By 1860, he was a director of the Commercial Banking Co. of Sydney, the Australian General Assurance Co. and the Sydney Exchange Co., and had served on the committees of the Sydney Chamber of Commerce and the Union Club. He remained active in the family firm until 1863, when he became a pastoralist with a large orchard and fruit cannery. He was an early director of the Colonial Sugar Refining Company, and he was an active member of the Anti-Transportation League. In 1889, he was appointed to the New South Wales Legislative Council, where he served until 1893. Lamb died at Rooty Hill in 1906.

Around 1846, he married Jane Cox, with whom he had a daughter. He subsequently married Margaret Elizabeth Dangar, daughter of Australian politician and explorer Henry Dangar, on 11 February 1858, with whom he had a further nine children.
