= John Walker (Presbyterian minister) =

Rev. John Walker DD (c. 1855 – 14 September 1941) was a Presbyterian minister in New South Wales; also Ballarat, Victoria, and Canberra, ACT.

== History ==
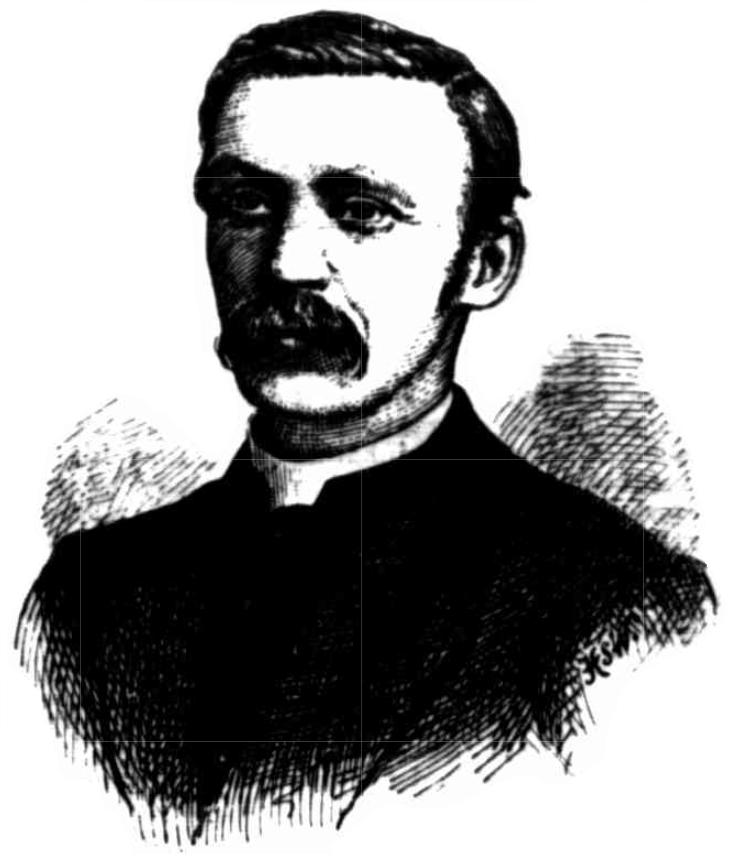
Rev. Walker c. 1890

Walker was born in Oxton, Cheshire county, England, in a family with strong Scottish and Presbyterian roots, and was educated at Birkenhead. He worked as clerk to a Liverpool merchant, then for the American evangelists Moody and Sankey Around 1876 he left for Australia, on account of his health, and in Sydney befriended the Presbyterian philanthropist John H. Goodlet, and was encouraged to train at St Andrew's College for the Presbyterian ministry.

Sometime around 1878 he was appointed general secretary of the YMCA.

He was ordained as a minister and licensed as a preacher by the Metropolitan Presbytery of Sydney on 8 June 1881. He was assigned to the Shoalhaven district, and served as an assistant to the pioneering Presbyterian William J. Grant, DD (c. 1805 – 9 August 1897) for two years. He was then offered the charge of a new church at Burwood, but elected to take the remote post of Germanton (now Holbrook) at the head of the Murray River, several days' journey on horseback. He soon became a popular and respected member of the community, and established a thriving church in the area, and another at Culcairn. Several articles refer to his attachment to the Bathurst Presbyterian church, but contemporary newspapers could only record his doings at Germanton, some 400 km away.

In May 1888 he was called to the new charge at Woollahra, into which he was inducted on 31 July.

=== Council of the Churches ===
In 1889, while stationed at Woollahra, Walker established a "Council of the Churches", a forum of representatives from the various evangelical Protestant churches of the Sydney area, as a pressure group which met monthly in the YMCA hall. Its initial goal was to dissuade the government from relaxing laws relating to Sunday observance. The council was formed several years ahead of a similar body in Melbourne, but its vitality was lost when Walker resigned as secretary in 1895, and eventually folded, to be revived in another form in 1924.

While at Woollahra he served as editor of The Presbyterian and The Presbyterian Messenger, also contributing a series of historical articles, "Fathers and Founders of the Presbyterian Church of N.S. Wales", which commenced on 4 February 1897. He resigned by necessity when he moved to Victoria — in 1908 he accepted a call to St Andrew's Kirk, Ballarat, and took up his new post in April, only the church's third minister (Note: William Henderson was inducted 10 February, 1858 and died 22 July 1884. Rev. T. R. Cairns was inducted on 27 April 1887 and stepped down in 1908, retaining the title "Senior Minister".) in 50 years. and served there for 19 years, though taken away frequently by his other responsibilities. He was at Ballarat throughout the First World War, also serving as Presbyterian chaplain at the Ballarat Camp. All five sons enlisted for military service: four with the First AIF and Noel B. D. Walker, who had been working in Fiji, joined the King's Own Rifles. Three died or were killed in action.

=== Appointments ===
In 1899 he was appointed commissioner for the Century Fund, (Note: Referring to the century of Presbyterianism in NSW, not the year 1900.) a special-purpose account dedicated to establishing churches in new areas. Because of this appointment he declined nomination as Moderator for New South Wales.

In 1902 he was appointed Moderator of the Presbyterian Church in New South Wales.

In 1918 he succeeded Prof. Ronald G. Macintyre (1863 – 2 June 1954) as Moderator-General of the Presbyterian Church of Australia, stationed in Melbourne.

=== Canberra ===
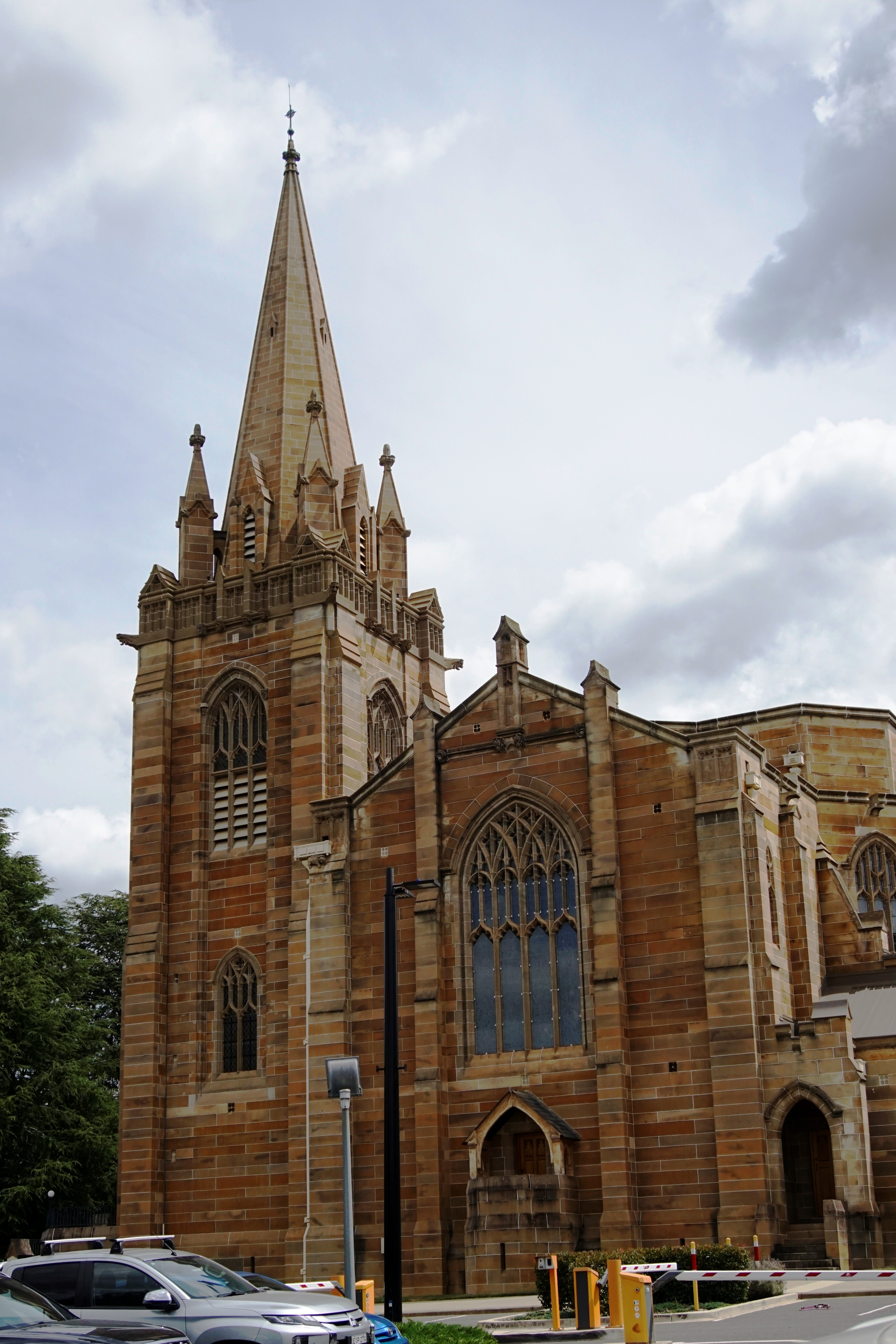
St Andrew's church, Canberra

On 1 January 1927 he formally retired from the Ballarat charge and was inducted as Canberra's first Presbyterian minister, and was largely responsible for the erection of the church building, at 1 State Circle, Forrest (the Canberra Avenue corner), and retired shortly after its completion in 1930 The plans included a "Warriors' Chapel", a screened-off space within the church, dedicated to Presbyterians who volunteered for service in time of war, especially those who lost their lives in the conflict, perhaps reflecting Walker's three sons lost in the Great War of 1914–1918. It features a four-light stained glass window, the work of Norman St Clair Carter.

The creation of a Presbyterian manse and cathedral put an end to the cooperation which had existed between Canberra's Congregational, Methodist and Presbyterian congregations.

== Other activities ==
Walker assisted Rev. Dr James Cameron (died October 1905) in editing a near-500-page History of the Presbyterian Church, N.S.W., published in 1905, and favorably reviewed.

== Family ==
Walker's father David Walker was English, but his mother Jemima Blackie was Scottish, a granddaughter of James Watt and a sister of John Stuart Blackie.

In 1883 Walker married Jessie Dight (1862–1932), eldest daughter of Arthur Dight MLA (1819–1895) and Janet Dight née McCracken (1841–1888). Three sons died or were killed overseas during World War I; two sons and two daughters survived their parents:

- Arthur Dight Walker (1884 – 18 October 1916), died of wounds.
- John Stuart Dight Walker MC (14 September 1885, killed in action, France, 21 July 1918)
- Janet Dight Walker (14 January 1887 – ) married Guy Gummell Smith on 7 March 1912.
- Alison Goodlet Dight Walker MC (29 May 1888 – 18 December 1945) with 6th Australian Light Horse Regiment. He was subject of official portrait by George Lambert.
- Marjorie Lundy Dight Walker (14 December 1889 – 8 July 1972) She enlisted in the Australian Army Nursing Service, was awarded the Greek Military Medal in 1919. She was engaged to Captain Goodall Madden, only son of Sir Frank Madden, but married Eric Osborn Thompson (1878–1944).
- Noel Balfour Dight Walker (26 December 1891 – 14 November 1916)
- Hilton Maxwell Dight Walker (21 March 1898 – ) was a chemist, enrolled with Pay Corps.
