= 1880 Windsor colonial by-election =

By-election in New South Wales, Australia

A by-election was held for the New South Wales Legislative Assembly electorate of Windsor on 29 July 1880 because Richard Driver died.

== Dates ==
Date	Event
8 July 1880	Richard Driver died.
9 July 1880	Writ of election issued by the Speaker of the Legislative Assembly.
27 July 1880	Nominations
29 July 1880	Polling day
3 August 1880	Return of writ

== Result ==
1880 Windsor by-election Thursday 29 July
Candidate	Votes	%
Henry McQuade (elected)	329	67.3
William Walker	160	32.7
Total formal votes	489	100.0
Informal votes	0	0.0
Turnout	489	77.7

== See also ==
- Electoral results for the district of Windsor
- List of New South Wales state by-elections
