= William Walker (New South Wales politician) =

Australian politician

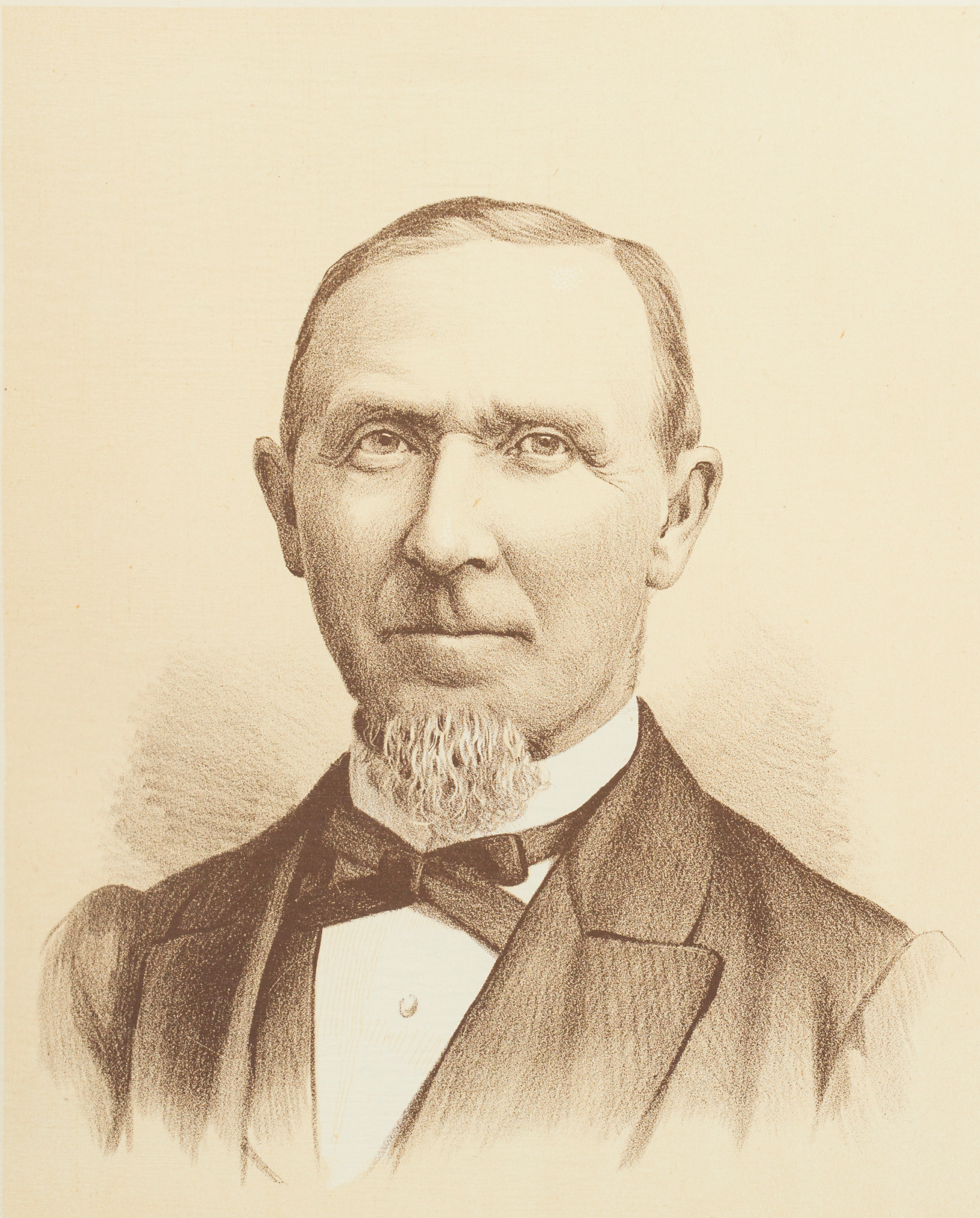
William Walker, MLC

William Walker (26 February 1828 – 12 June 1908) was a politician and solicitor in colonial New South Wales.

== Early life ==
Walker was born in Glasgow, Scotland, and arrived in Sydney with his parents in 1837. His father was a Presbyterian school teacher who had been recruited by Rev J D Lang and opened a school at Windsor. He was admitted as a solicitor in 1852 and practised at Windsor until his death in 1908.

== Politics ==
He was member of the Anti-Transportation League who had campaigned for John Darvall at the 1856 election for Cumberland North Riding and for Thomas Smith at the 1857 Cumberland North Riding by-election. He was elected as member for Windsor in the New South Wales Legislative Assembly at the 1860 by-election, holding the seat in 1860 and 1864, before being defeated at the 1869 election. In parliament he was a strong supporter of James Martin and his biography attributes his defeat to his support for Martin's land legislation which was unpopular with his squatting friends.

He contested the seat in 1872, 1874 and at the 1880 by-election but was unsuccessful. He also contested the 1872 election for Narellan, but achieved less than 1% of the vote.

On 8 February 1888 Walker was appointed to the New South Wales Legislative Council, serving until his death at Windsor on 12 June 1908 (aged 80).

New South Wales Legislative Assembly
| Preceded by William Dalley | Member for Windsor; 1860–1869 | Succeeded by Arthur Dight |
