= December 1870 Goldfields South colonial by-election =

By-election in New South Wales, Australia

A by-election was held for the New South Wales Legislative Assembly electorate of Goldfields South on 12 December 1870 as a result of the Legislative Assembly declaring the election of Ezekiel Baker was void. Baker had been appointed to conduct a Royal Commission to inquire into the laws and regulations of the goldfields and for securing a permanent water supply. The Committee of Elections and Qualifications held that this appointment was an office of profit under the crown which meant he was incapable of being elected, or of sitting, or voting, as a member of the Assembly.

== Dates ==
Date	Event
18 August 1870	Question referred to the Elections and Qualifications Committee.
4 November 1870	The Assembly considered the report of the Elections and Qualifications Committee and declared the seat vacant.
5 November 1879	Writ of election issued by the Speaker of the Legislative Assembly.
21 November 1879	Nominations at Adelong
12 December 1879	Polling day
3 January 1871	Return of writ

== Polling places ==
- Adelong
- Kimo, near Gundagai
- Grenfell
- Quondong
- Wombat
- Elrington, now known as Majors Creek
- Kiandra
- Upper Adelong
- Broken-cart Creek, near Talbingo
- Reedy Flat, now known as Batlow
- Araluen
- Mongarlowe
- Jembaicumbene
- Junee
- Sebastopol.

== Result ==
1870 Goldfields South by-election Monday 12 December
Candidate	Votes	%
Ezekiel Baker (elected)	1,054	79.9
George Stephen	265	20.1
Total formal votes	1,319	100.0
Informal votes	0	0.0
Turnout	1,319	66.0

== See also ==
- Electoral results for the district of Goldfields South
- List of New South Wales state by-elections
