= June 1870 Goldfields South colonial by-election =

By-election in New South Wales, Australia

A by-election was held for the New South Wales Legislative Assembly electorate of Goldfields South on 20 June 1870 because of the resignation of Ezekiel Baker.

== Dates ==
| Date | Event |
|---|---|
| 27 May 1870 | Ezekiel Baker resigned. |
| 31 May 1870 | Writ of election issued by the Speaker of the Legislative Assembly. |
| 20 June 1870 | Nominations |
| 11 July 1870 | Polling day |
| 1 August 1870 | Return of writ |

== Result ==
1870 Goldfields South by-election Monday 20 June
| Candidate | Votes | % |
|---|---|---|
| Ezekiel Baker (re-elected) | unopposed | |

== See also ==
- Electoral results for the district of Goldfields South
- List of New South Wales state by-elections
