= Thomas Whistler Smith =

Australian politician

The Honourable Thomas Whistler Smith

Member of Legislative Assembly of New South Wales
- In office 11 September 1857 – 11 December 1859

Personal details
- Born: 26 September 1824 London, England
- Died: 11 December 1859 (aged 35) London, England
- Relatives: Henry Smith (uncle); John Street (brother-in-law); Alfred Lamb (brother-in-law); Walter Lamb (brother-in-law); Edward Lamb (brother-in-law)
- Education: University of Sydney

Thomas Whistler Smith, MLA (26 September 1824 – 11 December 1859) was an Australian politician. He served as a member of the New South Wales Legislative Assembly from 1857 until his death in 1859. He was the deputy chairman and managing director of the Commercial Banking Company of Sydney (now National Australia Bank), and his uncle Henry Gilbert Smith was the chairman of the Commercial Banking Company of Sydney.

He married Sarah Maria Street, sister of Australian politician John Rendell Street, patriarch of the Street family. His sister Henrietta Octavia Lamb (née Smith) married John de Villiers Lamb, son of Commander John Lamb, who was the chairman of the Commercial Banking Company of Sydney, and who was the son-in-law of John Robinson of Holloway, a London banker and the deputy chairman of Lloyds Bank.

== Biography ==
Smith was born in London. He was the son of Thomas Smith, a businessman known for the Smith Bros importing company that he and his brothers Eustace Smith and Henry Gilbert Smith founded. At the age of 6, Smith emigrated to Sydney with his family. After an elementary education, he joined his father's import and mercantile business. Smith was made a director of the Commercial Banking Company of Sydney in 1850, before departing for other directorships in 1851. He was also the deputy chairman of the Sydney Exchange Company, and a director of the Australian Gaslight Company, and a director of the Australian Trust Company, and a director of the Australian General Assurance Company, and a director of the Australian Steam Navigation Company. In 1857, he returned as a director of the Commercial Banking Company of Sydney, where he was made deputy chairman and managing director. In 1857, Smith was elected as the member for Cumberland (North Riding) in the New South Wales Legislative Assembly. He won the seat at a by-election caused by the resignation of John Darvall who had become disenchanted with some of the more liberal features of the colonial constitution. He was re-elected at the 1858 election, but he resigned before the next election to take up his position in London. He did not hold a ministerial or parliamentary position. He resigned his other directorships in 1859 and was sent to the United Kingdom to establish the Commercial Banking Company of Sydney's first London office. However, shortly after his arrival in London he developed diphtheria, and he died at the age of 35.

New South Wales Legislative Assembly
Preceded by John Darvall	Cumberland (North Riding); 1857 – 1859; Served alongside: Plunkett	Succeeded by Seat Abolished
