= 1857 Cumberland (North Riding) colonial by-election =

By-election in New South Wales, Australia

A by-election was held for the New South Wales Legislative Assembly electorate of Cumberland North Riding on 11 December 1857 because of the resignation of John Darvall.

== Dates ==
| Date | Event |
|---|---|
| 26 November 1857 | John Darvall resigned. |
| 28 November 1857 | Writ of election issued by the Speaker of the Legislative Assembly. |
| 8 December 1857 | Nominations |
| 11 December 1857 | Polling day |
| 17 December 1857 | Return of writ |

== Result ==
1857 Cumberland (North Riding) by-election Friday 11 December
| Candidate | Votes | % |
|---|---|---|
| Thomas Smith (elected) | 394 | 57.4 |
| Henry Parkes | 292 | 42.6 |
| Total formal votes | 686 | 100.0 |
| Informal votes | 0 | 0 |
| Turnout | 686 | 30.8 |

== See also ==
- Electoral results for the district of Cumberland (North Riding)
- List of New South Wales state by-elections
