= Henry Flett =

Australian politician

Henry Flett (1 April 1810 – 8 November 1877) was a Scottish-born Australian politician.

He was born in Caithness to farmer Henry Flett and Diana Stephens. He migrated to New South Wales around 1834 and farmed with William Stewart, a member of the New South Wales Legislative Council. In 1841 he married Mary Wynter, with whom he had ten children. He bought land on the Manning River, and bought the estate of Taree, where he founded the town. In 1859 he was elected to the New South Wales Legislative Assembly for Hastings, where he served until his defeat in 1864. Flett died at Taree in 1877.

New South Wales Legislative Assembly
New seat	Member for Hastings; 1859–1864	Succeeded by William Forster
