= Joseph Gorrick =

Australian politician

Joseph Albert Gorrick (6 July 1843 – 22 April 1921) was an Australian politician.

He was born at Wilberforce to farmer Jacob Gorrick and Elizabeth Maskie. Educated at Maitland, he became a solicitor's clerk and was admitted as a solicitor in 1868. Also in 1868 he married Cecilia Catherine Hillcoat, with whom he had seven children. He practised at Maitland from 1868, eventually setting up his own practice in 1871. In 1882 he was elected to the New South Wales Legislative Assembly for Wollombi, but he was defeated in 1885. Gorrick died at Neutral Bay in 1921.

New South Wales Legislative Assembly
Preceded by Joseph Eckford	Member for Wollombi; 1882–1885	Succeeded by Lyall Scott
