= James Cunneen =

Politician from New South Wales, Australia

James Augustine Cunneen (22 February 1826 – 19 April 1889) was an Australian politician.

He was born at Mulgrave to pastoralist John Cunneen and Mary Flanagan. He was educated at Windsor and became a farmer and pastoralist.

In 1861 he married Elizabeth Hudson, with whom he had eight children. In 1860 he was elected to the New South Wales Legislative Assembly for Hawkesbury, serving until his defeat in 1869. He returned to the Assembly as the member for Wollombi in 1872, serving until 1877. In September 1865 the Governor declared that a member of the Legislative Assembly was capable of holding the office of Postmaster-General, and Cunneen was appointed, becoming the first member of parliament to hold the office so since the establishment of Responsible Government in 1856. He served until January 1866, however his appointment as a minister did not give him a seat in cabinet.

After leaving politics he became a land agent, but found little success.

Cunneen died after falling down a flight of stairs at his Paddington home in 1889 (aged 63).

Political offices
Preceded by William Christie as public servant	Postmaster-General; 1865–1866	Succeeded by Joseph Docker
New South Wales Legislative Assembly
Preceded by John Darvall	Member for Hawkesbury; 1860–1869; Served alongside: William Piddington	Succeeded by Henry Moses
Preceded by Joseph Eckford	Member for Wollombi; 1872–1877	Succeeded by Joseph Eckford
