= Lyall Scott =

Politician in New South Wales, Australia

Lyall Scott (1835 – 3 April 1887) was a Scottish-born Australian politician.

He was born at Balwyllo, Angus, Scotland to farmers Robert Scott and Susana Lyall. He migrated to New South Wales around 1852 and worked as a timber merchant and clerk. On 17 December 1858 he married Mary Louisa Pashley; although this union resulted in no children, a second marriage on 10 March 1866 to Martha Matilda Pashley resulted in three. In 1885 he was elected to the New South Wales Legislative Assembly for Wollombi, but he resigned a year later due to ill health and died in Sydney in 1887 (aged 52).

New South Wales Legislative Assembly
Preceded by Joseph Gorrick	Member for Wollombi; 1885 – 1886	Succeeded by Richard Stevenson
