= Henry Gilbert Smith =

Australian politician

The Honourable Henry Gilbert Smith
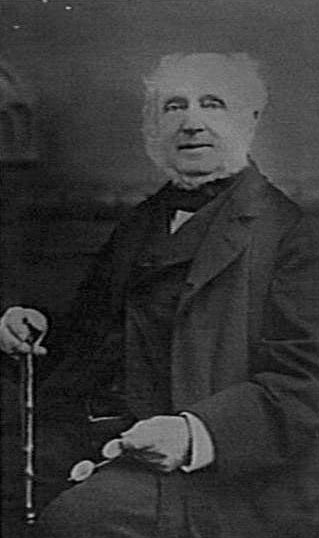

Member of Legislative Council of New South Wales
- In office 11 September 1856 – 11 December 1858

Personal details
- Born: 26 September 1802 Northamptonshire, England
- Died: 4 January 1886 (aged 83) Brighton, England
- Citizenship: Australian
- Relatives: Thomas Smith (nephew)

Henry Gilbert Smith, MLC (1802 – 1 April 1886) was an English-born Australian politician, businessman and banker, known as the "Father of Manly". He was the founder and developer of the Sydney suburb of Manly, where he built Fairlight House facing Delwood Beach. He was the chairman of the Commercial Banking Company of Sydney (now National Australia Bank), of which his nephew Thomas Smith was the managing director and deputy chairman.

== Biography ==
Smith was born in Northamptonshire, England to Thomas Smith and Frances Flesher. He migrated to Tasmania in 1827 and from there to Sydney, acquiring land on the Molonglo Plain. In 1839 he married Eleanor Whistler; he would later remarry Anne Margaret Thomas in 1856 and Anna Louisa Lloyd later than that. With his brothers Eustace Smith and Thomas Smith, he ran an importing and mercantile firm called Smith Bros in the early 1830s. He later became a director of the Commercial Banking Company of Sydney (now National Australia Bank).

He was the brother of Thomas Smith and thereby the uncle of Australian politician and banker Thomas Whistler Smith, who was the deputy chairman and managing director of the Commercial Banking Company of Sydney. From 1856 to 1858 he was an appointed member of the New South Wales Legislative Council. Smith died at Brighton in England in 1886.

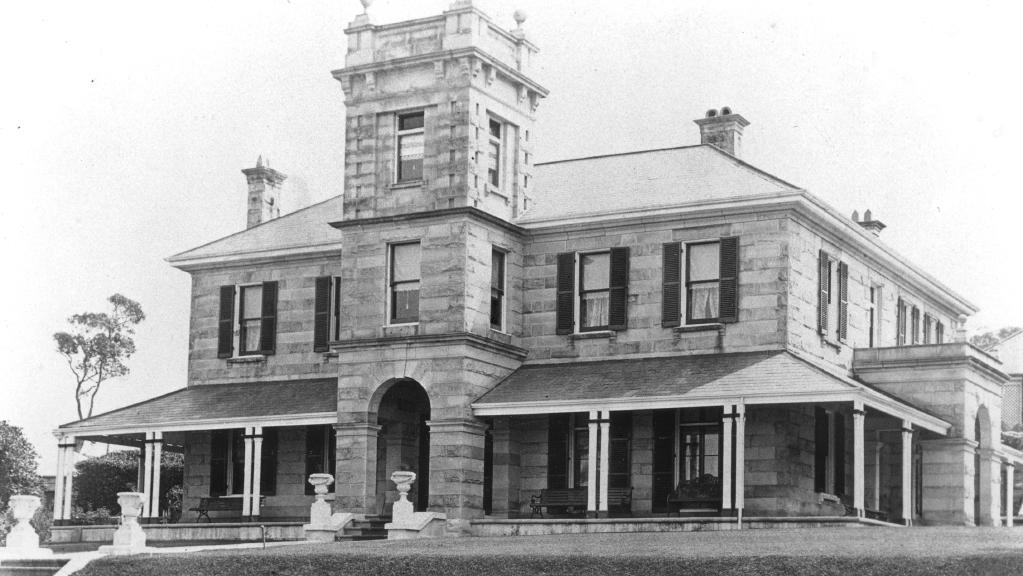
Fairlight House, Manly

Smith was the founder and developer of the Sydney suburb of Manly, where he built a home called Fairlight House facing Delwood Beach. It was demolished in 1939. A more lasting memorial was erected by Smith in 1856, in the form of a large statue of a kangaroo, located in Kangaroo Street, Manly.
