= Arthur Dight =

Australian politician

Arthur Dight (6 June 1819 – 31 July 1895) was an Australian politician.

He was born in Windsor, the son of John Dight, surgeon and pioneer settler, and Hannah, née Hilton. A landowner, he ran stations in Queensland. On 29 July 1861 he married Jannet McCracken, with whom he had ten children.

In 1869 he was elected to the New South Wales Legislative Assembly for Windsor, serving until his retirement in 1872. Dight died at Darling Point in 1895.

His brother Charles Hilton was a miller and a member of the Victorian Legislative Council, while his nephew, also called Charles Hilton, was subsequently elected to the New South Wales Legislative Assembly as the member for Singleton.

== Family ==
Dight married Janet McCracken (1841–1888); their children included

- Jessie Dight (1862–1932) married John Walker
- Helen S. Dight (1872–1893)
- Muriel Templeton Dight (1875–1893)
- Arthur Hilton Dight (1878–1918)

New South Wales Legislative Assembly
Preceded by William Walker	Member for Windsor; 1869–1872	Succeeded by Richard Driver
