= Electoral district of The Hastings (New South Wales) =

Former state electoral district of New South Wales, Australia

Hastings was an electoral district of the Legislative Assembly in the Australian state of New South Wales from 1859 to 1880. It was abolished in 1880 as part of the first major redistribution since 1858, replaced by Hastings and Manning from 1880 to 1894, which elected two members with voters casting two votes and the two leading candidates being elected. In 1894 it was divided between the single-member electoral district of Hastings and Macleay and Manning. In 1920 proportional representation was introduced and Hastings and Macleay was absorbed into the new four-member district of Oxley. The electorate was named after the Hastings, the alluvial valleys of which contained most of its population.

== Members for Hastings ==
Member	Party	Term
Henry Flett	None	1859–1864
William Forster	None	1864–1869
Horace Dean	None	1869–1870
Robert Smith	None	1870–1880

== Election results ==
1877 New South Wales colonial election: The Hastings Saturday 3 November
Candidate	Votes	%
Robert Smith (re-elected)	1,018	94.2
Thomas Amos	63	5.8
Total formal votes	1,081	100.0
Informal votes	0	0.0
Turnout	1,093	34.5
