= Stephen Scholey =

Australian politician (1815–1878)

- Scholey, right, with his wife Ann

Member of the New South Wales Legislative Assembly for East Maitland
- In office 24 February 1872 – 13 May 1878
- Monarch: Victoria
- Premier: Sir James Martin; Sir Henry Parkes; Sir John Robertson; James Farnell
- Preceded by: Alexander Dodds
- Succeeded by: Henry Badgery

Personal details
- Born: 22 January 1815 Holbeck, Leeds, England
- Died: 13 May 1878 (aged 63) East Maitland, Colony of New South Wales
- Party: Independent

Stephen Scholey (22 January 1815 – 13 May 1878) was a member of the New South Wales Legislative Assembly.

== Early life ==
Scholey was born on 22 January 1815 in a house on Garden Street in the village of Holbeck, near Leeds. The son of John Scholey (1774 – 1834), a landed proprietor, by his spouse Mary (née Gray) (1778 – 1856). Stephen, with his brother and sister, inherited a Leeds estate from their father which included a major part of the village of Holbeck, now a suburb of Leeds.

Scholey was first apprenticed as a butcher, as was his brother, John. Stephen was listed in White's History, Gazetter & Directory of the West Riding of Yorkshire for 1837 as resident at 25 Templars Street, with a butcher's business at 2 Cheapside, Leeds.

He married at Leeds Minster (St. Peter's, where he had been baptised) Ann (1809–1888) daughter of William Spink, a Yeoman of Wintringham, East Riding of Yorkshire, by his spouse Mary Topham. They had two children: John Scholey (1840–1908), and Mary Ann (1847–1896) who married, as his second wife, Daniel Cotterill (1826–1916). Both his children were born at the family residence at 27 Trafalgar Street, Leeds, and they were still living there in March 1851.

== New South Wales ==
In October 1852 he arrived at Melbourne, Australia on board “Julia”, together with his young son. His wife and young daughter joined them in Melbourne in December 1854 on board “Constance”. He travelled to East Maitland, New South Wales as a livestock agent. He returned to Leeds two years later on the ship Speedy, when he sold his business. He thereafter diversified his business and political interests and returned to colony. On 13 December 1861, he and James Brunker purchased 600 head of cattle at a sale in the Northumberland Hotel, Maitland. In March 1862 a new municipality of East Maitland was created and elections were called. Stephen Scholey was elected Alderman for the new municipality on 25 April 1862; and on 2 May 1867, he was commissioned by the Colonial Office, with a Letters Patent from the colony's governor, Sir John Young (and witnessed by Henry Parkes, who had stood for election to the Legislative Assembly in Scholey's East Maitland in August 1863, but was defeated by J. B. Darvall), to that effect, to be Warden and President of the Maitland District Council.

In 1869 he stood unsuccessfully for a seat in the colony's parliament, coming second, losing by just 35 votes. However, on 24 February 1872, he was elected the Member of the New South Wales Legislative Assembly for East Maitland, a seat he held until his death. He became a friend and colleague of the famous New South Wales parliamentarian Sir Henry Parkes, and a leading light in the temperance movement.

"Stephen Scholey, M.L.A.," had a town address in Jamison Street, Sydney, and country address in Melbourne Street, East Maitland.

He died from a ruptured duodenal ulcer, and was buried in the Wesleyan cemetery at East Maitland on 14 May 1878, the day after his death. An obituary for Stephen Scholey, with an engraving of him, appeared on Saturday 1 June 1878 in The Sydney Mail.

New South Wales Legislative Assembly
Preceded by Alexander Dodds	Member for East Maitland; 1872–1878	Succeeded by Henry Badgery
