= Electoral district of Windsor (New South Wales) =

Former state electoral district of New South Wales, Australia

Windsor was an electoral district of the Legislative Assembly in the Australian state of New South Wales, created in 1859 and named after the town of Windsor. It was abolished in 1880. The sitting member at the time, Henry McQuade, unsuccessfully contested the district of The Hawkesbury following the abolishment.

== Members for Windsor ==
| Member | Party | Period |
|---|---|---|
| William Dalley | None | 1859–1860 |
| William Walker | None | 1860–1869 |
| Arthur Dight | None | 1869–1872 |
| Richard Driver | None | 1872–1880 |
| Henry McQuade | None | 1880–1880 |

== Election results ==
1880 Windsor by-election Thursday 29 July
| Candidate | Votes | % |
|---|---|---|
| Henry McQuade (elected) | 329 | 67.3 |
| William Walker | 160 | 32.7 |
| Total formal votes | 489 | 100.0 |
| Informal votes | 0 | 0.0 |
| Turnout | 489 | 77.7 |

Richard Driver died.
