= Joseph Eckford =

Australian politician

Joseph Eckford (8 November 1814 – 22 November 1884) was an Australian politician.

He was born in Newcastle to mariner William Eckford and Mary Orrell. He was a publican before entering politics, and on 19 June 1848, he married Harriet Kerwin, with whom he had ten children. In 1860, he was elected to the New South Wales Legislative Assembly for Wollombi. He served until his defeat in 1872. He returned to the Assembly in 1877, serving until he was defeated again in 1882. Eckford died in Sydney in 1884.

New South Wales Legislative Assembly
Preceded by William Cape	Member for Wollombi; 1860–1872	Succeeded by James Cunneen
Preceded by James Cunneen	Member for Wollombi; 1877–1882	Succeeded by Joseph Gorrick
