= Alexander Dodds =

Australian politician

Alexander Dodds (2 April 1814 – 6 February 1892) was a Scottish-born Australian politician.

He was born at Kelso to farmer James Dodds and Helen Gray. He migrated to Australia in 1834, settling near Singleton with his brother. In 1836 he moved to Maitland, where he was an auctioneer, alderman and long-serving mayor. In 1867 he married Mary Dickson, with whom he had six children. He also held land runs in the Warrego district of Queensland. In 1864 he was elected to the New South Wales Legislative Assembly for East Maitland. He served until his defeat in 1872. In 1885 he was appointed to the New South Wales Legislative Council, where he remained until his death at Willoughby in 1892.

New South Wales Legislative Assembly
Preceded by John Darvall	Member for East Maitland; 1864–1872	Succeeded by Stephen Scholey
