= 1869–70 New South Wales colonial election =

Colonial election for New South Wales, Australia in 1869–70

New South Wales colonial election, 1869–70
- 3 December 1869 – 10 January 1870

All 72 seats in the New South Wales Legislative Assembly 37 Assembly seats were needed for a majority
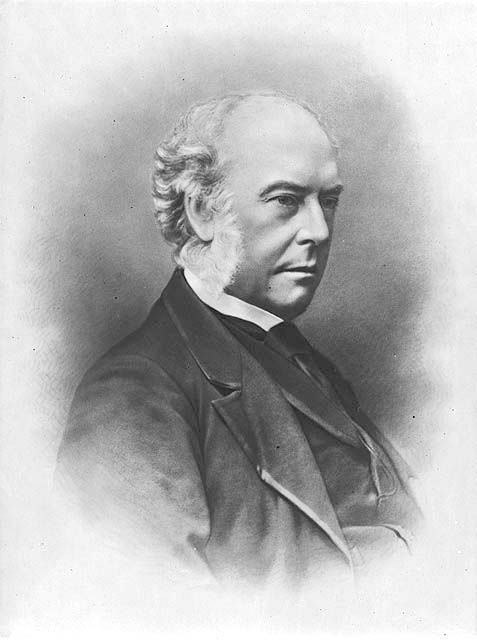

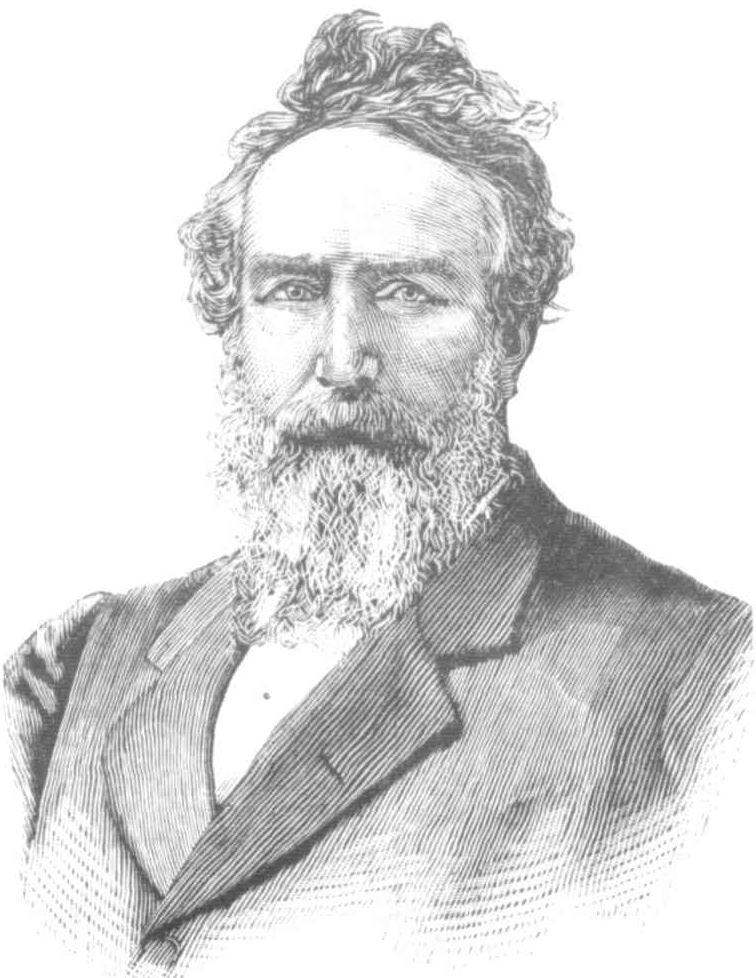
	First party	Second party
Leader	Charles Cowper	David Buchanan
Party	Government	Opposition
Leader's seat	(elected to Liverpool Plains)	(elected to East Sydney)
Seats won	34	25
- Results of the election, showing winners in each seat. Seats without member charts indicate the electorate returned one member.
Premier before election
John Robertson
Elected Premier
Charles Cowper

The 1869–70 New South Wales colonial election was held between 3 December 1869 and 10 January 1870. This election was for all of the 72 seats in the New South Wales Legislative Assembly and it was conducted in 52 single-member constituencies, six 2-member constituencies and two 4-member constituencies, all with a first past the post system. Suffrage was limited to adult white males. The previous parliament of New South Wales was dissolved on 15 November 1869 by the Governor, Lord Belmore, on the advice of the Premier, John Robertson.

There was no recognisable party structure at this election; instead the government was determined by a loose, shifting factional system. While the government, also called the Ministerial party, was returned in this election, Premier John Robertson could not get the support of the legislative assembly, and stepped aside for Charles Cowper to form a government.

== Key dates ==
Date	Event
15 November 1869	The Legislative Assembly was dissolved, and writs were issued by the Governor to proceed with an election.
2 December to 27 December 1869	Nominations for candidates for the election closed.
3 December 1869 to 10 January 1870	Polling days.
27 January 1870	Opening of new Parliament.

== Results ==
New South Wales colonial election, 3 December 1869 – 10 January 1870 Legislative Assembly << 1864–65–1872 >>
Enrolled voters	124,433				
Votes cast	87,137		Turnout	53.70 (Note: There were 11 uncontested districts and turnout is based on the roll of 103,795 for the contested districts.)	+2.30
Informal votes	226		Informal	0.41	+0.05
Summary of votes by party
Party	Primary votes	%	Swing	Seats	Change
Total	87,137			72	

== See also ==
- Members of the New South Wales Legislative Assembly, 1869–1872
- Candidates of the 1869–70 New South Wales colonial election
