= Horace Dean =

Australian politician

Horace Dean (10 November 1814 – 8 May 1887) was an American who practised as a doctor in Australia and was a journalist and political candidate at elections in South Australia and New South Wales.

Dean was born in Chicago. In 1846, he enlisted in the Mexican–American War as a surgeon and cavalry captain, apparently using forged medical diplomas from Dartmouth College, New Hampshire, and the Saint Louis University School of Medicine, Missouri. In 1847, he killed a fellow officer in a duel and fled to England, where he spent some months in a lunatic asylum. He married Jane Ann Mitchell, at Hastings and travelled to Adelaide as surgeon on the Augusta in 1849.

He practised as a doctor in Angaston in the Barossa Valley and was naturalised and admitted to a roll of medical practitioners in October 1850. He became an honorary special magistrate in 1852. His populist attacks on George Angas, led Angas to investigate Dean's qualifications and identity. As a result, Governor MacDonnell wrote in 1855 to Jefferson Davis, American Secretary of War to clarify the matter and Davis rejected Dean's claims. He was forced to resign from the magistracy and was struck off the medical rolls in 1857. He attempted to redeem his name by standing for the first election to the House of Assembly for Barossa in March 1857. He won, but he was disqualified by the Court of Disputed Returns. He won the resulting by-election in June but was disqualified again.

Dean travelled to Melbourne and Sydney where he wrote for Henry Parkes' The Empire and in 1858 became as a storekeeper at Tinonee, near Taree on the Manning River. He again practised medicine, although unregistered, and started the Manning River News in 1865. In December 1869, he was elected for The Hastings but was disqualified because he worked for the Government as a postmaster. In July 1870, he won the resulting by-election but was again disqualified by the Committee of Elections and Qualifications, this time on the ground that he had not, at the time of his election and return, "resided in the colony five years after naturalization."

Dean then moved to Uralla and, in 1875, he purchased a store at Grafton. He became Mayor of Grafton, in 1878, but was sacked within six months for "gross mismanagement". He announced his intention of writing his autobiography, but a flood washed away his papers and destroyed his store. He died in Grafton, survived by four sons and four daughters.

== Notes ==
New South Wales Legislative Assembly
Preceded by William Forster	Member for Hastings; 1869–1870	Succeeded by Robert Smith
