= Electoral district of Wollombi =

Former state electoral district of New South Wales, Australia

Wollombi was an electoral district for the Legislative Assembly in the Australian state of New South Wales. It was created in 1859, named after and including the town of Wollombi, however the district extended to the coast including the towns of Gosford and Norah. The southern border was the Hawkesbury River while the northern border was Lake Macquarie and Dora Creek. It was abolished in 1894 and absorbed into Northumberland.

== Members for Wollombi ==
Member	Party	Period
William Cape	None	1859–1860
Joseph Eckford	None	1860–1872
James Cunneen	None	1872–1877
Joseph Eckford	None	1877–1882
Joseph Gorrick	None	1882–1885
Lyall Scott	None	1885–1886
Richard Stevenson	None	1886–1887
Richard Stevenson	Free Trade	1887–1889
Richard Stevenson	Protectionist	1889–1894

== Election results ==
1891 New South Wales colonial election: Wollombi Monday 29 June
Party	Candidate	Votes	%	±%
Protectionist	Richard Stevenson (re-elected)	795	72.8	
Free Trade	Joseph Gorrick	297	27.2	
Total formal votes		1,092	98.2	
Informal votes		20	1.8	
Turnout		1,112	46.3	
Protectionist hold				
