= Robert Burdett Smith =

Australian politician (1837–1895)

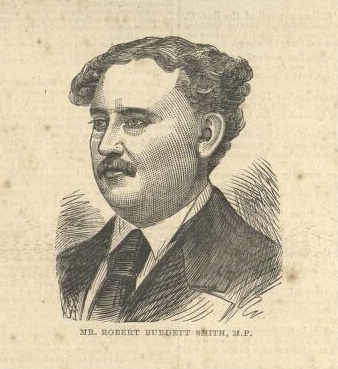
Robert Burdett Smith, 1880

Robert Burdett Smith CMG (25 August 1837 – 2 July 1895) was a solicitor and politician in colonial New South Wales, a member of the New South Wales Legislative Assembly and later the New South Wales Legislative Council.

Born Robert Lloyd Smith, he was the twin son of John Lloyd Smith and his wife Mary Ann, née Salmon in Sydney. Robert was educated at William Timothy Cape's school under Dr D. A. McKean and J. Sheridan Moore. He changed his name to Robert Burdett Smith, and was admitted a solicitor of the Supreme Court of New South Wales in 1863, practicing in Sydney. He was at one time president of the Australian Patriotic Association, and was secretary to the committee of the Captain Cook Memorial Fund. He was a member of the New South Wales Legislative Assembly for the Hastings and Macleay electorates from 1870 to 1889, when he was nominated to the New South Wales Legislative Council. Smith was a Commissioner for New South Wales at the Colonial and Indian Exhibition in 1886, and was Executive Commissioner for that colony at the Melbourne Centennial Exhibition of 1888. In 1890 he was created Companion of the Order of St Michael and St George.

The town of Smithtown, New South Wales on the Macleay River, is named after him.

New South Wales Legislative Assembly
Preceded by Horace Dean	Member for Hastings; 1870–1880	Succeeded by James Young; Joseph Andrews as Member for Hastings and Manning
New seat	Member for Macleay; 1880–1889	Succeeded by Otho Dangar; Patrick Hogan
