= Electoral district of East Maitland =

Former state electoral district of New South Wales, Australia

East Maitland was an electoral district of the Legislative Assembly in the Australian state of New South Wales from 1859 to 1904 in the Maitland area.

== Members for East Maitland ==
Member	Party affiliation	Period
Joseph Chambers	None	1859–1859
James Dickson	None	1859–1863
John Darvall	None	1863–1863
Alexander Dodds	None	1864–1872
Stephen Scholey	None	1872–1878
Henry Badgery	None	1878–1880
James Brunker	None	1880–1887
James Brunker	Free Trade	1887–1901
James Brunker	Liberal Reform	1901–1904

== Election results ==
1901 New South Wales state election: East Maitland
Party	Candidate	Votes	%	±%
Liberal Reform	James Brunker	990	67.6	+15.6
Ind. Progressive	William McIlroy	475	32.4	
Total formal votes		1,465	99.7	+0.7
Informal votes		4	0.3	−0.7
Turnout		1,469	69.9	−0.2
Liberal Reform hold				
