= Woodford Academy =

Former Australian academy school and museum

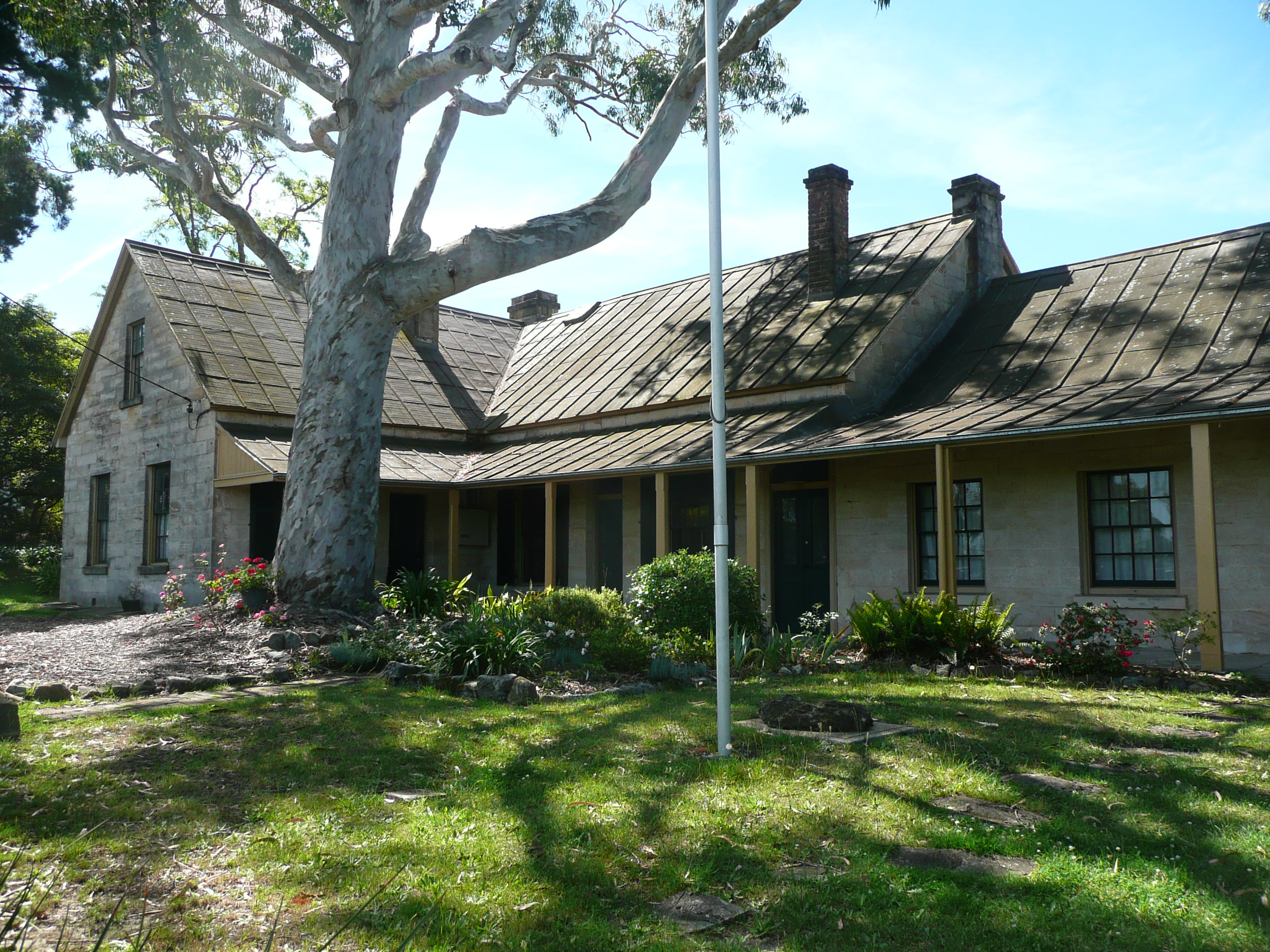
- The Woodford Academy, pictured in 2009
- Interactive map of the Woodford Academy area

General information
- Location: Woodford, NSW, 90–92 Great Western Highway, Woodford, City of Blue Mountains, New South Wales, Australia
- Coordinates: 33°43′59″S 150°28′25″E
- Construction started: 1828
- Completed: 1835
- Location within New South Wales

Site notes
- Architectural style: Victorian Georgian
- Owner: National Trust of Australia (NSW)

New South Wales Heritage Register
- Official name: Woodford Academy; Woodman's Inn; King's Arms Inn; Woodford Apartments; Buss's Apartments; Woodford House; Academy School
- Type: State heritage (built)
- Designated: 1 March 2002
- Reference no.: 1509
- Type: Inn/Tavern
- Category: Commercial
- Builders: Michael Pembroke

Woodford Academy is a heritage-listed former academy school, inn, private residence and boarding house and now a museum, and tourist attraction at 90–92 Great Western Highway, Woodford in the City of Blue Mountains local government area of New South Wales, Australia. It was built from 1828 to 1835 by Thomas Michael Pembroke. It is also known as Woodman's Inn, King's Arms Inn, Buss's Inn, Woodford House and Woodford Academy. The property is owned by the National Trust of Australia (NSW). It was added to the New South Wales State Heritage Register on 1 March 2002.

== History ==
The site was erroneously described as a that of an early road gang's encampment because of its proximity to Bulls Camp.

In November 1824 Thomas Michael Pembroke was promised a land grant of 20 hectares (50 acres). In the late 1820s the site was occupied by William James. By 1830 James had erected improvements on the land.

In November 1830 Pembroke was promised 0.81 hectares (2 acres) of land. c. 1830 he applied for his land at Twenty Mile Hollow (Woodford). By 1831 Pembroke had made a selection of land at the site partly including James' improvements. By September 1832 Pembroke was given possession of the land. By 1833 Pembroke's hut existed (on the right-hand (north) side of the road adjacent to James' improvements. His stone and weatherboard 'Woodman's Inn' possibly existed by 1833; it definitely existed by 1835 (Licensee Michael Pembroke) when described by Messrs. Backhouse and Walker as "a miserable hovel adjoining a public house which we declined entering some weeks before from the wretched appearance of the place".

On 28 October 1835 Pembroke was granted 20 hectares (50 acres) of land. By 1835 Woodman's Inn (in weatherboard) existed on the site of the early road gangs' encampment at Twenty Mile Hollow. In 1836 William James stood trial for the murder of his wife. Pembroke called it "The Woodman Inn" and he lived there with his wife and 6 children. The inn provided food and lodgings for travellers from Sydney on their way to Bathurst and the Western Plains. Soldiers and colonial officials were some of their guests. Pembroke was granted a further 19 hectares (48 acres) at what was then known as "Twenty Mile Hollow". He fell on hard times, heavily mortgaging the property and being sentenced to two years on a road gang for stealing slabs of wood at Springwood. His sentence was later reduced to one year but forced him to sell "The Woodman Inn" in 1839. In 1839 his debtors sold it to Michael Hogan. At the time it was leased by G. K. Bryant.

In 1841 the grant measured 1,510 by 1,550 metres (4,950 ft × 5,100 ft). An 1842 sketch of the "Inn at Twenty Mile Hollow" shows a building unlike the present buildings. From 1842–44 Col. John Edward Bull had a camp for a road gang nearby. It is possible families stayed at the Inn. In 1843 James Nairn was licensee of the King's Arms Hotel, succeeded in 1846 by William Barton, 1847 by John Cobcroft and 1854 by Thomas James. In 1855 Hogan sold the property to William Buss. From 1856–57 Buss held the license of 'The King's Arms' Hotel. The inn was more popularly known as "Buss" Inn'. c. 1856 a Police Lock Up was built to the inn's west (now demolished).

By 1862, during William Buss's occupancy, the west wing was added. In 1863 a railway plan denotes the buildings as the 'King's Arms Inn' showing the main building and dairy building in their existing form. The kitchen building is in three parts. Nearby there are a number of other timber buildings, now demolished. From 1867 until 1879 it was a private country retreat, owned by Alfred Fairfax, and from 1880 to 1907 it was a salubrious guesthouse house. In 1867 Buss left a life interest in the property to his wife, Bridget Buss. In 1868 the railway line reached the Weatherboard Inn at Wentworth Falls. In August 1868 the widow Mrs Buss sold the property to Alfred Fairfax. A March 1869 sketch of "Buss's" by John Vine Hall shows the present complex. In October 1869 it was advertised as 'Mountain air Woodford (late Buss's) Apartments vacant J.Sheils'.

In 1869 to 1870 Woodford House was opened as the first guesthouse in the Blue Mountains managed by John Shiels. The property was then 36 hectares (90 acres). An 1869 drawing by Vine Hall shows the main and dairy buildings in their present form. The dairy has a shingled roof and green-painted shutters. A picket fence had been built.

A pear tree (Pyrus communis cv.) has been identified on a (now) adjacent block of land that appears to date directly from the Fairfax period of ownership of the property (1860/70), suggests local horticulturist teacher with TAFE, Doug Knowles. The tree is most likely to be the last remnant of an orchard and garden planted for Fairfax, who developed the property as a gentleman's residence. Fairfax renamed his home "Woodford House" and built the second-storey east wing, primarily to accommodate his Sydney friends and their servants. It became an exclusive retreat for him and his friends. During his time here he bought more land c. 1868 and then owned 90 acres on which he created an orchard and house garden to provide fresh food for his guests. Fairfax had "house and servants" at Woodford.

In 1874 an observation was made of the transit of Venus 200 yards to the west of Woodford. Members of the scientific community visited the Fairfax property to observe the phenomenon. Portable observatories were set up in tents for the observations.

In 1879 the house was still described as Mr. Fairfax's "commodious residence and large gardens namded Woodford". In c. 1880 William Manning made additions to the kitchen building and opened the property as a guest house: "Woodford House".

From October 1881 until 1907 it is said to have been a fashionable guest and function house.

On 29 June 1897 the mortgagee, William Manning put the property up for auction and sold it to his employee David Flannery. At this time it was described as a sanatorium with two blocks of land 16.49 hectares (40.75 acres) and 20 hectares (50 acres). 'buildings are substantial...accommodation is large...pleasure grounds and orchard extensive...' Flannery subdivided and sold some of the land.

Pre 1902 the railway zig zag at Lapstone was bypassed.

A March 1903 inventory of the contents was made, with the rooms named and another made in 1905.

In November 1906 it was sold under the Real Property Act (occupied by Edward Graves).

=== Use as a school ===
From 1907 to 1934 under lessee (and distinguished classics scholar) John Fraser McManamey, it became a significant school, the Woodford Academy, in competition and then in succession to Cooerwull Academy at Lithgow, the other major Presbyterian school outside Sydney, where McManamey had previously taught.

John McManamey was a Scottish policeman's son from Wellington, educated at an Anglican boarding school, All Saints' College in Bathurst, then at the University of Sydney, where he lived at St. Andrew's College. At University and College he was enabled to indulge his passions for classical literature, and extended them into English literature, while living a vigorous outdoor and sporting life. After graduation, he was founding headmaster of Dr. Aspinall's Scots College in Sydney (now in Bellevue Hill). He left to found his own school, the Australian College and then went to Queensland to be senior classics master at the renowned Ipswich Grammar School. In 1903 he returned to NSW's central west to be rector of Cooerwull Academy, but again ventured out to create a school of his own in 1907. This was Woodford Academy, directed, like Cooerwull, towards the Sydney University entry examination and elite learning generally. This was a significant school, in competition and then in succession to Lithgow's Cooerwull Academy (which McManamey had been rector of from 1903–07). Woodford Academy was a case of adapting much older buildings to school use, while supplementing the old with a custom-made wing.

Over 300 students were educated in the Blue Mountains location between 1907 and 1925, benefitting from a curriculum based on the liberal arts with commercial subjects available for those intending to enter business life. There are tales of daily morning swims, even in the winter months, to encourage hygiene and develop character. Confident that his students would "make their mark on history", McManamey encouraged his boys to engrave their initials into their school desks and the rock shelves that surround the school buildings. They did so, but many made their mark in ways unimaginable at the time, distinguishing themselves for their actions in both world wars.

In December 1908 it was subdivided and the greater part sold to Mary Jane Waterhouse, mother of Eben Gowrie Waterhouse, later of Sydney University and Eryldene, Gordon. In 1910 the timber concert room was blown over. In 1913 Mrs McManamey died. In July 1914 the remainder of 5.1 hectares (12.5 acres) including the buildings was sold to John Fraser McManamey.

Over the duration of World War I, fifty four boys from Woodford Academy enlisted to serve King and country. Their names are listed on an Honour Roll Call, and the National Trust's Woodford Academy Management Committee hopes family and friends will recognise names and come forward with additional information on the boys. This will be added to research carried out as the basis for a display at the Academy commemorating the centenary of the Anzacs from August 2014 to November 2018. Interactive ebooks are progressively developed and displayed at the Academy museum on the centenary of the month each boy enlisted for the Great War.

From 1924–1965 the Academy Dining Hall was used for Presbyterian church services. Between 1924 and 1968 the land was further subdivided. The Academy closed in 1925 and McManamey used the building as a private residence. He reopened the school for local children in 1930, closing it again in 1936. After the Academy closed to all but private tuition in 1936, the McManamey family lived privately in the house. John Fraser McManamey died in 1946. In February 1949 Miss Gertrude McManamey inherited it.

The kitchen verandah was reconstructed in c. 1950s. From the 1950s–70s the east wing was used as a shop on two occasions. The kitchen wing was used as a flat. In 1961 land to the academy's east was donated to the Presbyterian Church. In 1976 the kitchen verandah was removed. In 1978 the Department of Main Roads proposed road widening which slightly reduced the area of the site.

From 1978–82 repair and conservation works were done for the National Trust of Australia by Clive Lucas P/L, including conversion of s5 to a bathroom; conversion of s9 to a kitchen; repair of windows to s9, s10 and s6; repair of rear door s8, removal of a vine and repair of stone walls to the dairy building; repair of the roof and eaves to the main building and providing new downpipes and gutters; reconstruction of the chimney over space 8.

=== Management by the National Trust of Australia ===
In April 1979, Miss Gertrude McManamey gifted the property to the National Trust of Australia (NSW). BMACHO suggests Miss McManamey's gift was on condition she could live there until she died. She died in 1988, having left the property in 1986 to be cared for at the Queen Victoria Homes, Wentworth Falls.

Barry O'Keefe AM, QC, former President of the Board of the National Trust of Australia (NSW), regularly visited Woodford Academy, which he loved and had visited since the Trust first negotiated with Gertrude McManamey over its acquisition, when it was falling down around her. He used his own money, spending a substantial amount to restore parts of the building particularly the eastern part of the main building. He did this unheralded and in the manner which marked his ethos of service.

The National Trust received a $1m Centenary of Federation grant from the Australian Government in 2001 which O'Keefe had a major part in obtaining, to help restore the property. Visitation to Woodford Academy increased 600 per cent in 2013/14 due largely to a widely expanded programme of events showcasing local artists, performers and historians and partnerships in local events. New primary and high school programmes have been launched, museum displays have been updated, the dining hall repainted, sandstone re-laid on the front verandah and external timberwork repaired.

A lively new volunteer team at Woodford Academy have turned the fortunes of the property around from 2013–2015, also making it a centre for Blue Mountains artistic innovation. Cutting-edge performances using local talent to interpret the historic complex with sound, light, colour, taste – in new ways not before contemplated. Ghosts provide evening entertainment. The "Make your mark in history" project, developed to commemorate students of the Academy who fought in World War I received a 2015 National Trust Heritage Award. The Norman Lindsay Gallery, Everglades and Woodford Academy were all represented in the Blue Mountains Winter Magic street festival which attracted over 30,000 people.

== Description ==
=== Site ===
The features contemporary with the construction of the building such as sandstone flagging, the stone tank, make a large contribution to the significance of the complex and should be considered as an integral part of the buildings. Not much seems to have survived from the Fairfax and guest house periods with the possible exception of some of the paving and perhaps the water pumps. These are also important as parts of this phase of the development of the buildings.

Of all the site features however, the engraved (with boy students of the Academy's names: there are many such, e.g. RSBS who was Ralph Sanders Barclay Sillar, a student in 1909 and after World War I, a successful lawyer, who lived on until 1970) on the massive rock shelves at the site's rear (east) are probably the most interesting because they graphically demonstrate the use of the building as a school in the early 20th century. The various names personalise the history of the building (sic: site).

In addition to any inherent significance the landscape at the site may have (not surveyed) the existing landscape does provide an aesthetically pleasing setting for the historic buildings. A number of the mature trees are clearly remnants of the Victorian and Edwardian period(s).

Four Monterey pine trees (Pinus radiata) flank the south-west edge of the property onto the Great Western Highway. A large mature and significant eucalypt tree grows close to the centre of the main building facing the highway. Three more Monterey pines, two poplars, a lemon-scented gum and two paths – one stone, one brick, comprise the southern front boundary plantings, running roughly from mid-main building to both sides of the rough driveway and the property's eastern boundary shared with the Presbyterian church.

To the west of the building complex an area of poplars, suckers and undergrowth with Nile lilies (Agapanthus orientalis/praecox), weeds and other undergrowth existed. To the north (rear) of the building complex a similar area of poplar suckers, undergrowth, rubbish tip, septic tank, piles of building debris, a fruit tree and black bean (Castanospermum australe) fill the "courtyard" space between wing buildings which are located at right angles to the main building. Areas of sandstone paving are also part of this "space".

A concrete drive and garage building are located to the main building complex's east, the former located close to the Presbyterian church across the boundary. Inspection of the site indicates curtilage lines other than the boundaries of the present land ownership are appropriate. The mid-range views of paddocks from the rear of the property are pleasant and it would be unfortunate if this area were developed. The boundary here is very close and a more suitable line is at the old fence line further to the north. The lot to the east (Presbyterian church) is the most intrusive of the neighbouring properties and here the boundary is also very close. A more suitable line is the west side of the church.

None of the neighbouring buildings are particularly detrimental to the character of the Woodford Academy. The most significant surviving feature of the site is the maintenance of the historic link between the buildings and the Great Western Highway. Here the curtilage should extend to the railway property on the other side of the road with the view of controlling development directly opposite the site.

=== Building complex ===
The Woodford Academy shows layers of growth from the original two-roomed inn at the east end of the south block to the present footprint.

==== Original South Wing ====
The original south wing (i.e., east end) is a symmetrical single-storey sandstone building facing south to the Great Western Highway. The gabled roof is clad in galvanised iron (Moorewood & Rogers) tiles and has a brick chimney at the east end. A verandah on the south side is broken back to the main roof and has a beaded verandah plate, stop chamfered columns and a flagged floor. A 6-panel door with bead flush lower panels, fielded top panels and a diagonally divided toplight is at the centre of the wing. It is flanked by 8 over 8 pane double-hung windows. The north wall of the original wing has 2 no. 6 over 6 pane double hung windows. Floor is abutted boards (not tongue-and-groove).

==== West Extension (South Wing) ====
The west extension of the south wing is an L-shaped gabled wing with a sandstone chimney at the west end. The verandah roofline is an extension of the original verandah but is skillioned. The galvanised iron (Moorewood & Rogers) tile roof is also used on this extension and has boxed eaves. A pair of french doors with bead flush lower panel and a toplight open to the east end of the verandah. A pair of 2 panelled doors with a toplight are off centre in the south wall opening to the verandah. 6 over 6 pane double hung windows with 3 pane toplights are also in this wall.

A 4-panel door opens from the east side of the west leg of the wing. 6 over 6 pane double hung windows are in the north and south gabled wails with 4 over 6 pane double hung windows built to imitate casements, in the gable above. The windows in the south wall are shuttered. The west wall of the wing has 6 over 6 pane double hung windows. 2 no. hipped roof bay form dormers are in the west roof slope and have double hung windows detailed to look like casements. The sandstone verandah flagging extends around the wing.

=== Condition ===
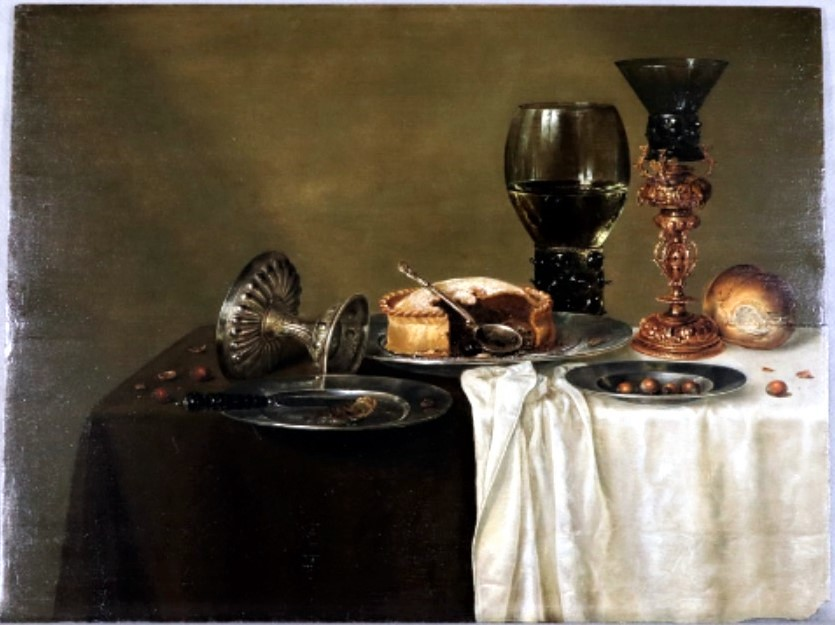
Recent funding from the National Trust made it possible to restore this painting from the Gertrude McManamey gift and it was reattributed to Gerret Willemsz Heda in 2022.

As of 20 June 2013, the property in early 1984 (both site and buildings) was in very poor condition pre-repair and conservation works). The buildings were however in an intact state and some repairs had been done to the main building. The Trust's Garden Committee had commenced a preliminary clearing of undergrowth. This site has a very high archaeological significance and potential.

The fabric is almost entirely original and of the last century. The Woodford Academy retains the intact layout and significant amounts of furniture and memorabilia of an early 20th-century private boarding school typical of the period prior to the introduction of government secondary school education in NSW c. 1911.

=== Modifications and dates ===
- 1832 – The Colonial Georgian Style building
- 1840 – A larger T-shaped wing with attic was added to the five-bay section.
- 1860 – Building was added to in 1860. Additions were made to the kitchen wing in sandstone.
- c. 1900 – A second story in brick was added to the kitchen wing with two storey verandah and covered way in courtyard.
- 1978 – Section of house occupied by Miss McManamey was upgraded, windows and doors were put in order and the kitchen and bathroom refitted to improve her quality of life. The roof was repaired; this involved reconstruction of a chimney stack, restructuring of a verandah, repairing eaves and renewing all gutters and downpipes.
- 1983 – Roof of main building replaced with reproduction Moorewood and Rogers tiles.
- 1990 – Stabilisation measures were taken out in the early 1990s (Robert Moore).
- 1996 – Other restoration and maintenance carried out by The National Trust since 1996 including conservation of Academy East Wing, West Wing, c. 1840 Wing, and Collections, landscaping, reconstruction of fences, toilet block, conservation of dairy, security and fire alarms.
- 2008 – Federal funding secured to allow installation of water tank.
- November 2008–January 2009 – National Trust Magazine (NSW): Funding was successfully sought from the Commonwealth Government, and from donors, to allow for the installation of a water tank, with work to be completed in the 2008–2009 year.

== Heritage listing ==
As of 23 July 2021, the oldest complex of colonial buildings in the Blue Mountains, Woodford Academy has had a distinguished history as a major private school as well as a Victorian country retreat, a significant inn and a seventy-year association with the McManamey family. There is a fair degree of complexity in the evolution of this site and it is therefore of high archaeological significance in its ability to reveal details about possibly William James’ hut, the Woodman’s Inn, the King’s Arms Inn, the grave yard, Woodford House, and Woodford Academy. These include matters such as the earlier configurations of the buildings and other features and the lifestyle of the occupants over time. Woodford Academy during the mid-late 1800s through the management of a Mrs Shiels, developed its use as Woodford House, a guesthouse, which was advertised as a 'Sanatorium' as far back as 1868 to promote the health benefits of its location. Woodford House was later acknowledged as having been the 'pioneer of the mountain's summer houses'. The likely association of Woodford Academy with the early development of guesthouses, summer retreats and sanatoria, all important in the history of the Blue Mountains more generally, is also a significant aspect in the history of the place. The site has considerable historical archaeological value and research potential to demonstrate the general character of its types of occupation from the early nineteenth century onwards. Previous monitoring of works indicates that significant archaeological deposits survive here which will provide evidence of the specific construction, form, nature, function and occupation of the former buildings and other structures on this site and its environs.

Woodford Academy was listed on the New South Wales State Heritage Register on 1 March 2002 having satisfied the following criteria.

The place is important in demonstrating the course, or pattern, of cultural or natural history in New South Wales.

The earliest house in the mountains, Woodford Academy has had a distinguished history as a major private school as well as a Victorian country retreat, a significant inn and a seventy- year association with the McManamey family.

The place is important in demonstrating aesthetic characteristics and/or a high degree of creative or technical achievement in New South Wales.

Woodford Academy is the only surviving example of a Victorian Georgian sandstone inn in the Blue Mountains. It has been extended and altered for its various uses but still retains its essential Georgian character especially in the south verandahs and their sandstone flagging. The south wing of the house retains its original small pane window sashes and attic window designed to appear as casements. The building has some unusual features such as the bay form dormer windows in the western roof slope.

The place has a strong or special association with a particular community or cultural group in New South Wales for social, cultural or spiritual reasons.

Anecdotal evidence further suggests that it is regarded as a heritage icon by both the Blue Mountains community and passing traffic, being highly visible from the main road. Of social significance being a well known Inn along the Western Road for much of its early history and more recently having various other uses including a school, Woodford Academy and a private residence. Overall the use and construction of the place reflects the social history of the Blue Mountains.

The place has potential to yield information that will contribute to an understanding of the cultural or natural history of New South Wales.

There is a fair degree of complexity in the evolution of this site and it is therefore of high archaeological significance in its ability to reveal details about possibly William James' hut, the Woodman's Inn, the King's Arms Inn, the grave yard, Woodford House, and Woodford Academy. These include matters such as the earlier configurations of the buildings and other features and the lifestyle of the occupants over time. The site has considerable historical archaeological value and research potential to demonstrate the general character of its types of occupation from the early nineteenth century onwards. Previous monitoring of works indicates that significant archaeological deposits survive here which will provide evidence of the specific construction, form, nature, function and occupation of the former buildings and other structures on this site and its environs.

== See also ==
- Australian residential architectural styles
