= Electoral results for the district of Grafton =

Election results for Grafton, New South Wales, Australia

Grafton, an electoral district of the Legislative Assembly in the Australian state of New South Wales was created in 1880 and abolished in 1904.

Election	Member	Party
1880	John See	None
1882	John See	None
1885	John See	None
1887	John See	Protectionist
1889	John See	Protectionist
1891	John See	Protectionist
1895	John See	Protectionist
1898	John See	Protectionist
1901	John See	Progressive

== Election results ==
=== Elections in the 1900s ===
==== 1901 ====
1901 New South Wales state election: Grafton
Party	Candidate	Votes	%	±%
Progressive	John See	843	94.2	+31.7
Independent Liberal	Frederick Wilcox	52	5.8	
Total formal votes		895	99.0	−0.5
Informal votes		9	1.0	+0.5
Turnout		904	37.9	−28.2
Progressive hold				

=== Elections in the 1890s ===
==== 1898 ====
1898 New South Wales colonial election: Grafton
Party	Candidate	Votes	%	±%
National Federal	John See	898	62.5	
Independent Federalist	Frederick McGuren	539	37.5	
Total formal votes		1,437	99.5	
Informal votes		7	0.5	
Turnout		1,444	66.1	
National Federal hold				

==== 1895 ====
1895 New South Wales colonial election: Grafton
Party	Candidate	Votes	%	±%
Protectionist	John See	unopposed		
Protectionist hold				

==== 1894 ====
1894 New South Wales colonial election: Grafton
Party	Candidate	Votes	%	±%
Protectionist	John See	994	57.2	
Ind. Protectionist	William Hawthorne	636	36.6	
Ind. Protectionist	Edmund Hockey	109	6.3	
Total formal votes		1,739	99.2	
Informal votes		14	0.8	
Turnout		1,753	83.2	
Protectionist hold				

==== 1891 ====
1891 New South Wales colonial election: Grafton Thursday 18 June
Party	Candidate	Votes	%	±%
Protectionist	John See (re-elected)	unopposed		
Protectionist hold				

=== Elections in the 1880s ===
==== 1889 ====
1889 New South Wales colonial election: Grafton Monday 4 February
Party	Candidate	Votes	%	±%
Protectionist	John See (elected)	955	71.2	
Protectionist	Richard Becher	386	28.8	
Total formal votes		1,341	98.0	
Informal votes		28	2.1	
Turnout		1,369	59.9	
Protectionist hold				

==== 1887 ====
1887 New South Wales colonial election: Grafton Saturday 5 February
Party	Candidate	Votes	%	±%
Protectionist	John See (re-elected)	unopposed		

==== 1885 ====
1885 New South Wales colonial election: Grafton Tuesday 15 October
Candidate	Votes	%
John See (re-elected)	unopposed	

==== 1882 ====
1882 New South Wales colonial election: Grafton Saturday 9 December
Candidate	Votes	%
John See (re-elected)	unopposed	

==== 1880 ====
1880 New South Wales colonial election: Grafton Friday 26 November
Candidate	Votes	%
John See (elected)	636	55.4
Richard Stevenson	513	44.7
Total formal votes	1,149	97.2
Informal votes	33	2.8
Turnout	1,182	62.3
	(new seat)	

Grafton was created from part of The Clarence.
