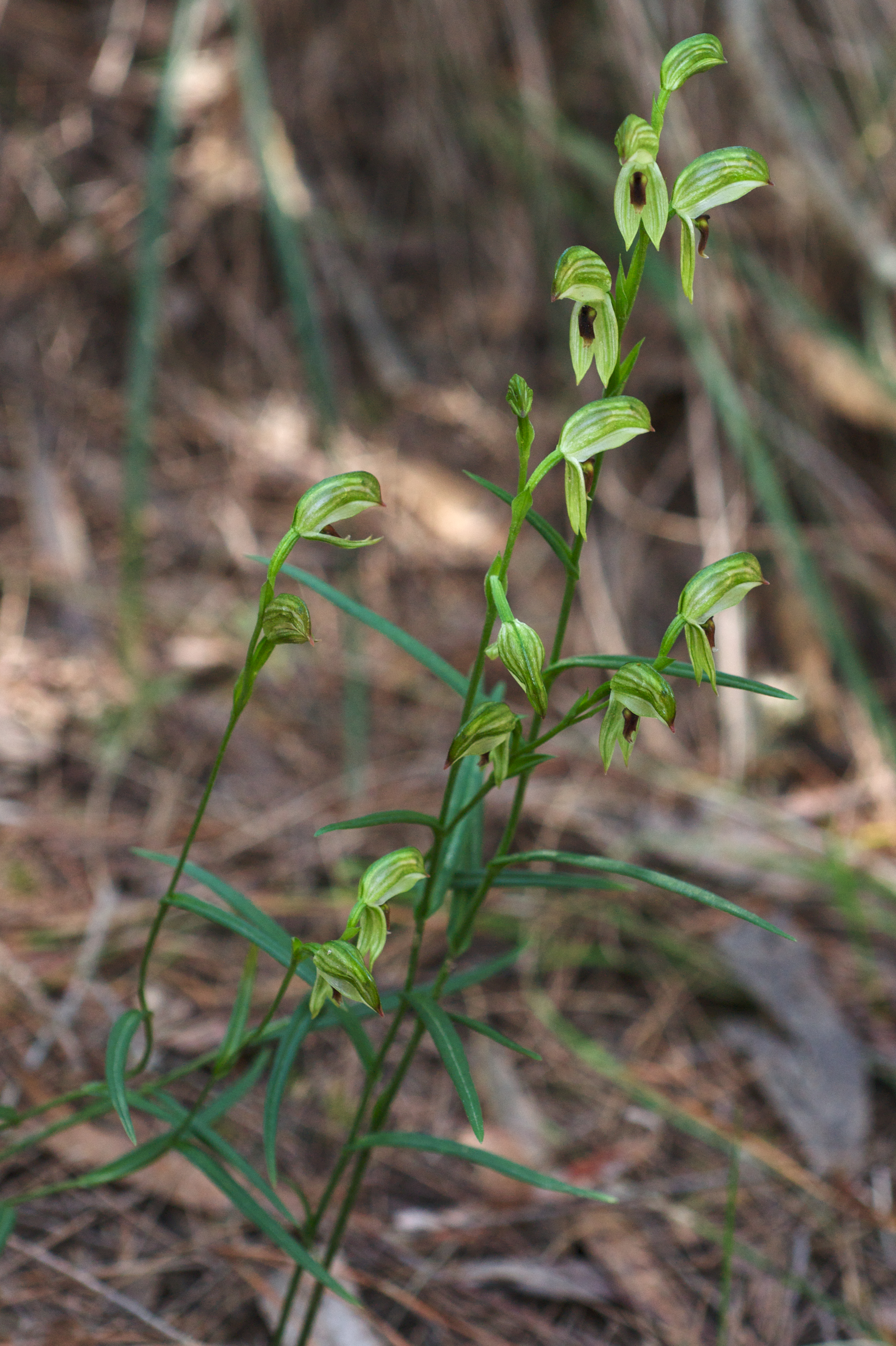
- Near Wentworth Falls

Scientific classification
- Kingdom: Plantae
- Clade: Tracheophytes
- Clade: Angiosperms
- Clade: Monocots
- Order: Asparagales
- Family: Orchidaceae
- Subfamily: Orchidoideae
- Tribe: Cranichideae
- Genus: Pterostylis
- Species: P. chocolatina

Binomial name
- Pterostylis chocolatina (D.L.Jones) G.N.Backh.

Synonyms
- Bunochilus chocolatinus D.L.Jones

= Pterostylis chocolatina =

Chocolate-lip leafy greenhood

Species of orchid

Pterostylis chocolatina, commonly known as chocolate-lip leafy greenhood, is a plant in the orchid family Orchidaceae and is endemic to New South Wales. As with similar greenhoods, plants in flower differ from those that are not. Plants not in flower have a rosette of leaves on a short stalk, but when in flower, plants lack a rosette and have up to thirteen green flowers on a flowering stem with stem leaves. The labellum is dark brown with a blackish lump near its base.

== Description ==
Pterostylis chocolatina, is a terrestrial, perennial, deciduous, herb with an underground tuber. When not flowering, plants have a rosette of between three and six leaves, each leaf 10–30 mm (0.4–1 in) long and 4–7 mm (0.2–0.3 in) wide on a stalk 60–110 mm (2–4 in) high. Plants in flower lack a rosette but have between three and thirteen flowers on a flowering spike 200–900 mm (8–40 in) high with between five and eight stem leaves that are 20–100 mm (0.8–4 in) long and 3–9 mm (0.1–0.4 in) wide. The flowers are dark green with darker lines, partly transparent, 17–20 mm (0.7–0.8 in) long and 6–8 mm (0.2–0.3 in) wide. The dorsal sepal and petals are joined to form a hood called the "galea" over the column. The lateral sepals turn downwards and are 12–15 mm (0.5–0.6 in) long, 6–8 mm (0.2–0.3 in) wide and joined for about half their length. The labellum is 5–8 mm (0.2–0.3 in) long, about 3 mm (0.1 in) wide and dark brown with a blackish lump on the top end. Flowering occurs from July to September.

== Taxonomy and naming ==
Chocolate-lip greenhood was first formally described in 2006 by David Jones who gave it the name Bunochilus chocolatinus. The description was published in Australian Orchid Research from a specimen collected near Wentworth Falls. In 2010, Gary Backhouse changed the name to Pterostylis chocolatina. The specific epithet (chocolatina) is a Latin word meaning "chocolate brown", referring to the colour of the labellum.

== Distribution and habitat ==
Pterostylis chocolatina grows between grasses and other small plants in moist, tall forest in the western Blue Mountains.
