= Task Force 72 =

Task Force 72 may refer to:

- Task Force 72 (United States Navy)
- Task Force 72 (model boat builders)
