= Glen Isla (house) =

Historic house in the Blue Mountains

Coordinates: 33°43′19″S 150°22′18″E

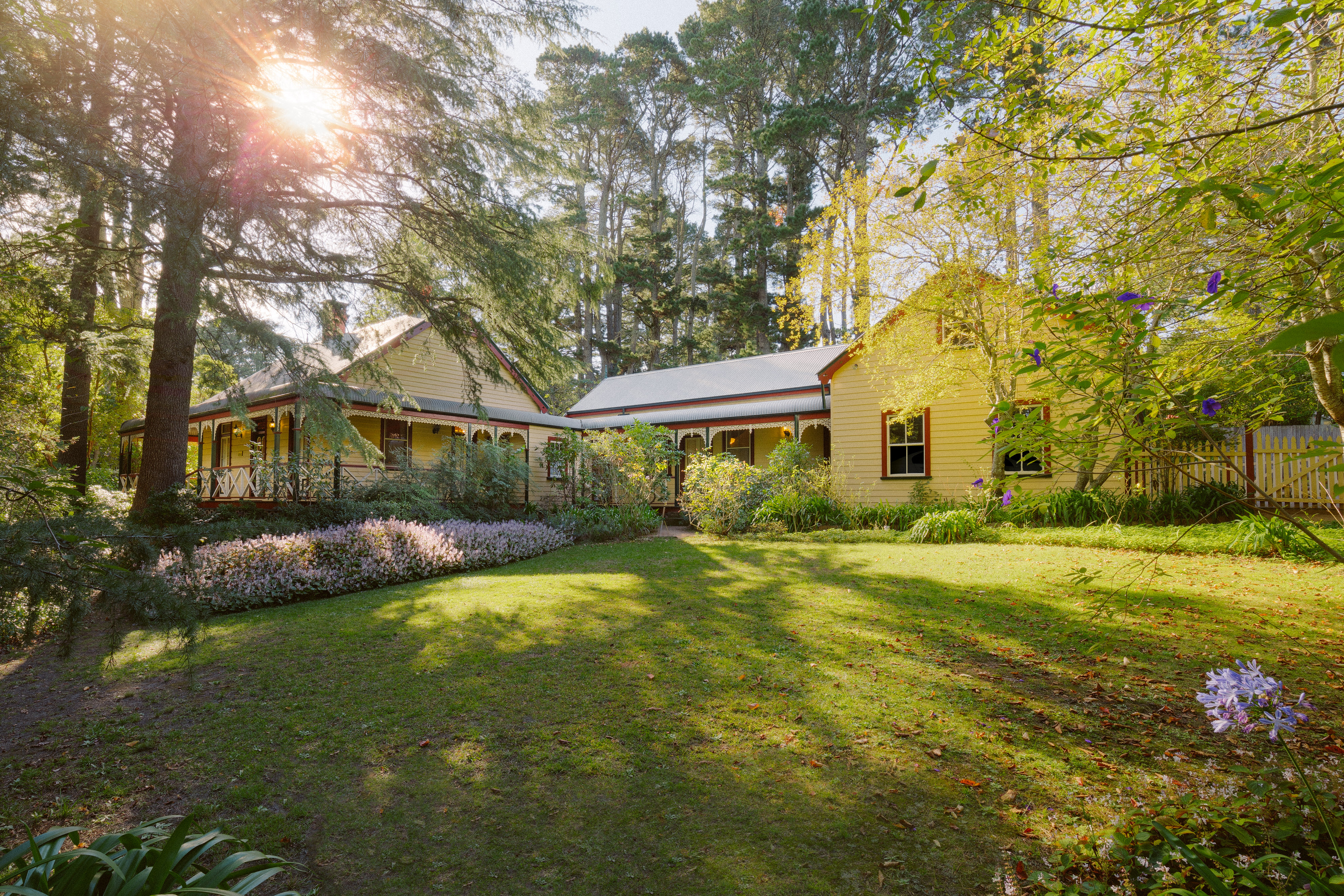
Glen Isla

Glen Isla is an historic house situated in the village of Wentworth Falls, Blue Mountains approximately 95 kilometres west of Sydney, Australia. The house has a state heritage listing.

== History and description ==
Glen Isla was constructed in approximately 1885 by Captain James Somerville Murray and his wife Elizabeth Lilla Murray (first matron at Royal Prince Alfred Hospital). The Murrays were prominent figures in Wentworth Falls with Captain Murray being the captain of vessels between Britain and Australia, and later an important figure in Wentworth Falls being in charge of the Irish Brigade who for two years constructed the National Pass

The house was constructed by the Murrays as a letting house up until the 1910s, and shared a laundry (still in existence) with St Cyrus (another Murray letting cottage adjacent). The house was eventually sold by the Murray family and was a private residence of the Park family in 1910s, and the Dumbrell family in the 1950s.

By the late 1980s the house and grounds had fallen into disrepair, and the new owners set about restoring Glen Isla. It again became a private residence until 2013, when the property was purchased by new owners and reverted to its original use as a letting house. As of 2020, the house and grounds are offered to the public as a letting house.

== See also ==
- List of Historic Houses
- List of Blue Mountains subjects
