= Davisville, Wentworth Falls =

Davisville
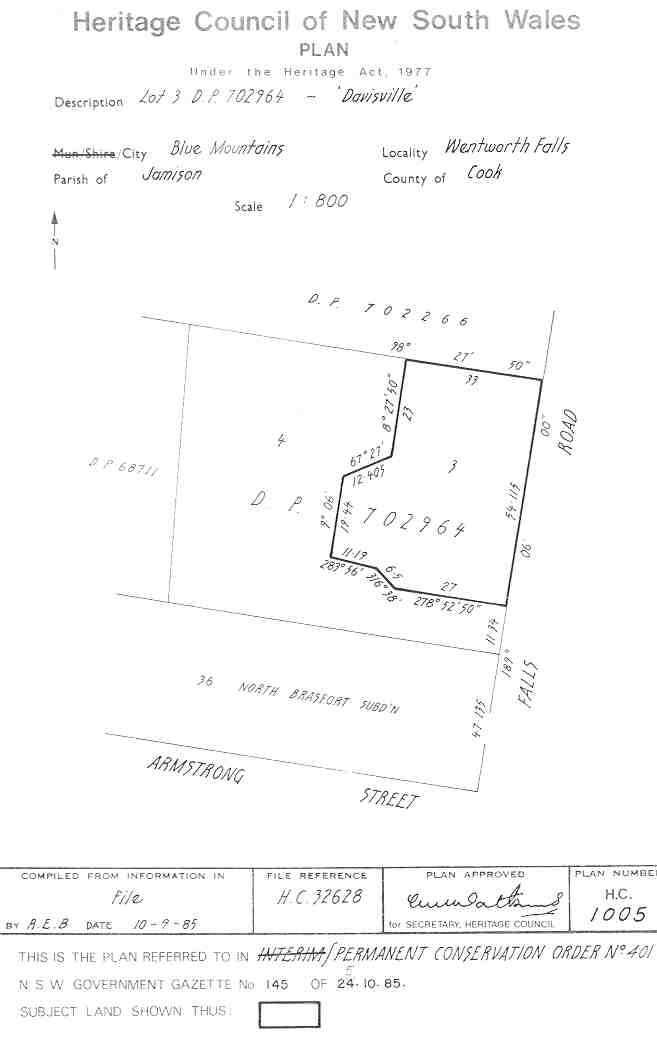
- Heritage boundaries

- Location within New South Wales Location within Australia
- 33°42′50″S 150°22′19″E
- Location: 63-67 Falls Road, Wentworth Falls, City of Blue Mountains, New South Wales, Australia

History
- Built: 1888–1920

New South Wales Heritage Register
- Official name: Davisville; Rennie House
- Type: State heritage (built)
- Designated: 2 April 1999
- Reference no.: 401
- Type: House
- Category: Residential buildings (private)
- Builders: David Davis, Sydney builder

Davisville is a heritage-listed former YWCA women's home, residence and commune and now residence and bed and breakfast in the Blue Mountains at 63-67 Falls Road, Wentworth Falls, New South Wales, Australia. It was built from 1888 to 1920 by David Davis, Sydney builder. It is also known as Rennie House. It was added to the New South Wales State Heritage Register on 2 April 1999.

== History ==
The first land grant in the area of Wentworth Falls was of 25 hectares (61 acres) to Edward Dougherty in 1857. The property on which Davisville was built was originally part of Dougherty's grant. In 1858 the land was bought by Archibald Campbell who owned it while the subdivision of Brasfort was formed. His daughters sold the Davisville subdivision to David Davis in 1888. Davis was an early purchaser of land along Falls Road (then Boonara Street). He appears to have built/ developed or owned a number of houses along Falls Road including no. 69, 74, 85 and 63.

David Davis, a Sydney builder, erected his eponymous holiday home in 1888 just north of the laid-out village of Brasfort, later Wentworth Falls. Davis clearly used materials from older houses in the building of Davisville, which has confused interpretation of the interior. There seem to have been additions made to the footprint of the house after 1913, if a rough sketch of that date can be trusted.

A c. 1920 photo of Davisville indicates the presence of the current footprint of the house including the verandah enclosures to the south, the Monterey pine (Pinus radiata) plantings along the northern boundary (large by this time), the tennis court on the north lawn and the Monterey pine tree adjacent to the tennis court. The Monterey pine on the southern side of the garden is not present in this photo. Davis finally sold the house in 1920 to the Young Women's Christian Association, which used it as a holiday home under the name Rennie House. Miss M. Stephens was resident at the house on behalf first of the YWCA and then their successors, the Christian Alliance of Women and Girls, from 1920 until after 1947.

In 1974 the Anglican church was using Rennie House and considered building a retirement village on the site. This project was abandoned and Robert Bunda, the antique dealer of Springwood, (cf. SP 030) bought the property around 1975. Alterations were made to the house about 1976 and it was soon sold to Mr and Mrs Seymour who leased it to a young commune around 1979. It is currently being conserved by new owners in preparation for the opening of a bed-and-breakfast establishment.

An interim conservation order was placed on Davisville in 1984 after community concern was raised over its fate and the adjacent "Mon Repos" in relation to a proposed development on the adjacent land. This resulted in subdivision of the rear of Davisville to its current layout which was established as the curtilage for the house at this time. A permanent conservation order was placed on the house in 1985. Mon Repos was not saved and has been replaced by a new house.

Significant alterations to the house occurred in 1985 under the ownership of Mrs G. Rawles which included alterations to the verandah, the demolition of rear outbuildings, replacement of all corrugated roofs including the bull-nosed verandah, the rewiring of all electrics and removal of pull cords, conversion of the central room along the north verandah to a bathroom (removed by the current owners). The garage was an addition under the ownership of the Westgarths in 1985.

In 1998 the house was altered internally with the placement of a number of ensuites and room divisions for conversion of the house into a bed and breakfast.

In 2006, under standard exemptions from the Heritage Council, Davisville underwent alterations to remove some of the 1998 Ensuites and alterations, and repair the surrounding verandah, in order to allow for the continued usage of the house as a private.

== Description ==
=== Garden ===
Mature Monterey pines (Pinus radiata) along the northern Falls Road boundary of the property (approx. 80 years old, over 30 metres (98 ft) high) are remnants of shelter belts around the property (mainly to the north, one tree to the south (since removed) and one beside the tennis court on the north lawn.

The general layout of the 1920s garden remains discernable today. The tennis court netting is gone but the flat area north of the house remains, as do surrounding windbreak trees, mainly (as noted above) Monterey pines. Large shrubs in the garden are likely to remain from the 1920s including a large mature Rhododendron sp./cv. near the front verandah, camellias etc. Dry stone walls also contribute to the mature landscape setting. The garden itself contributes to the leafy setting of Falls Road as a precinct.

The site contains a small gazebo to the west of the rear court, with a sandstone pond, both of these are said to be modern, c.1950 additions. There is also a garage added c.1985 in the northwest corner.

The frontage trees (east) sitting to the north and south of the house enframe it in a mature landscape setting, along with the northern windbreak treesa long the boundary. The northern windbreak tree closest to the garage is leaning over that.

Windbreak trees to the western boundary form a backdrop to the house. These consist of c. 1980s Leyland false cypresses added during the 1980s subdivision of the rear of the property, to provide privacy.

A double width driveway leads from Falls Road to the garage.

=== House ===
The original cottage (1888) was front four rooms only with an attached service wing to the rear with two fireplaces (only one survives). Now it is a three bay gabled cottage on north-south axis facing east to Falls Road, extended south c. 1912/1913-20 with a dining room (with decorative pressed metal walls and ceiling), to five bays.

Corrugated galvanised steel roof with fretwork barge boards in clubs and diamonds pattern and finials and exposed collar tie to gables. 3 no. brick-corbelled chimneys. Wrap-around bull-nosed verandah with corrugated galvanised steel roof, no rafters. Timber verandah posts with iron lace valance. Rusticated weatherboard cladding. Six panel front door with toplight centred on original cottage. Two pairs french doors either side of front door, double hung window and 3 panel half glazed door to southern extension (east facade).

Entry stair with decorative glazed tiles and slate treads with rendered spandrel and piers. Rear (west) wing at southern end with bullnosed verandah infilled at west end with rusticated weatherboards (LEP). The house bears substantial general visual appearance to, and is detailed similarly to a nearby house, Hastings, at 85 Falls Road, also built in 1888.

=== Kitchen block ===
Detached block to rear (south) of house in courtyard - demolished 1987.

=== Recent garage ===
c. 1985 single storey weatherboard building, corrugated.

=== Condition ===
As at 16 November 2010, good.

=== Modifications and dates ===
- c. 1913: extension
- c. 1920: modification for YWCA home use
- c. 1950: gazebo and sandstone pool added in rear garden
- c. 1975: likely modification for change of owner
- c. 1984/5: subdivision of rear of block.
- 1985: alterations to verandah; demolished rear outbuildings, re-roofed iron roofs including bull-nosed verandah; rewiring all electrics including all pull-cords for lights; converted central room along north verandah to bathroom (since removed by current owners); added current single storey double garage at rear.
- 1998: internal alterations - placement of a number of ensuites and divisions for conversion into bed-and-breakfast.
- 2006: (as exemptions) Removed some of 1998 ensuites and alterations to north-facing rooms, reinstating earlier room layouts, repaired surrounding verandahs to allow the use of the house again as a private residence.
- 2010: removal of 13 mature Monterey pine trees approved.
- c. 2016: iron lace work on verandah fabricated and reinstated.

== Heritage listing ==
Davisville was listed on the New South Wales State Heritage Register on 2 April 1999.
