= Electoral district of Grafton =

Former state electoral district of New South Wales, Australia

Grafton was electoral district of the Legislative Assembly in the Australian state of New South Wales from 1880 to 1904 and was named after and included the town of Grafton.

Its only member was John See and this was the only seat that See held. See was a member of the Protectionist Party from 1887 and which became the Progressive Party from 1901. See became Premier when William Lyne moved to Federal Parliament in March 1901. For the 1904 election the Legislative Assembly was reduced in size from 125 to 90 seats as a result of Federation. The redistribution saw Grafton absorbed by The Clarence, while much of The Clarence become part of Raleigh.

Sir John See retired as Premier and member for Grafton in June 1904 due to ill health, and accepted an appointment to the Legislative Council.

== Members for Grafton ==
Member	Party	Term
John See	None	1880–1887
John See	Protectionist	1887–1901
John See	Progressive	1901–1904

== Election results ==
1901 New South Wales state election: Grafton
Party	Candidate	Votes	%	±%
Progressive	John See	843	94.2	+31.7
Independent Liberal	Frederick Wilcox	52	5.8	
Total formal votes		895	99.0	−0.5
Informal votes		9	1.0	+0.5
Turnout		904	37.9	−28.2
Progressive hold				
