= John See =

Australian politician

The Honourable Sir John See KCMG JP
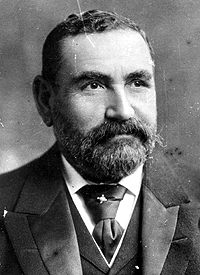

14th Premier of New South Wales
- In office 28 March 1901 – 14 June 1904
- Preceded by: William Lyne
- Succeeded by: Thomas Waddell
- Constituency: Grafton

Personal details
- Born: 14 October 1844 Yelling, Huntingdonshire, England
- Died: 31 January 1907 (aged 62) Randwick, New South Wales, Australia
- Spouse: Charlotte Mary Matthews (1876–1904)
- Children: Charlotte I. A. (m. Hordern); John Charles Matthews; Ruby Edith S.; Percy George; Lillian M. I.; Henry C. M. "Harry"; Villiers James G.; John Bruce; Infant (name unknown); Sydney M.

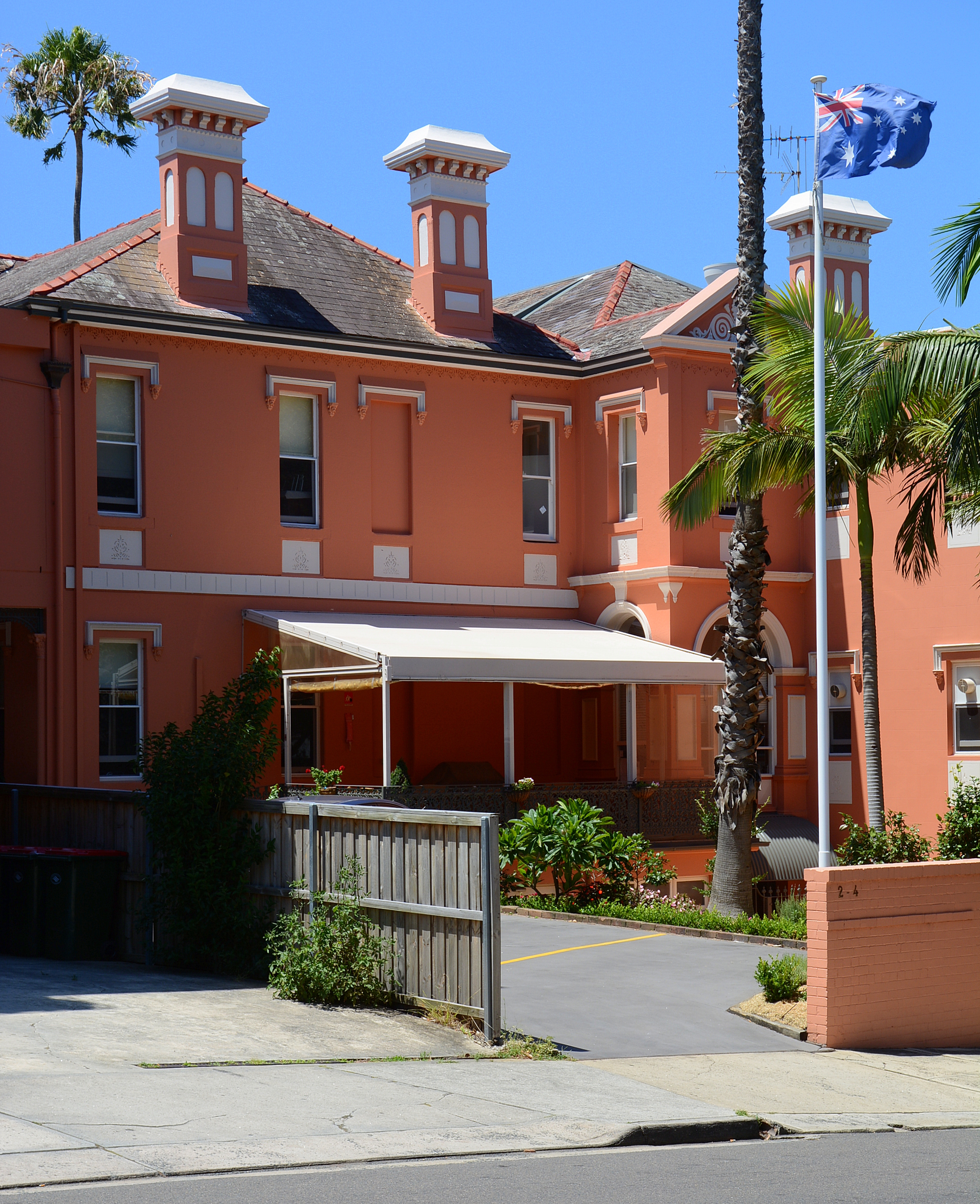
Milford House, See's Italianate mansion in the Sydney suburb of Randwick

Sir John See KCMG JP (14 October 1844 – 31 January 1907) was a member of the New South Wales Legislature from 26 November 1880 to 15 June 1901, and was then Premier of New South Wales from 1901 to 1904.

He was well regarded by both sides of politics, for Labour politicians judged that the establishment of the State clothing factory during his administration had a great influence in abolishing sweating, and that the right to women to vote for New South Wales parliament, although not to stand for it, was also introduced. The governor of New South Wales at the time of his Premiership, the 7th Earl of Beauchamp, privately judged See to be "a self made man of good heart but a most pushing and disagreeable manner".

== Early life ==
See was the son of Joseph See, a farm-labourer, and his wife Mary Ann née Bailey, and was born in Yelling, Huntingdon, England. The Parish Records of his baptism show that he was christened "See or Seekings" and that his parents/grandparents etc. used both surnames. He acquired property throughout the state, including Yester Grange.

== Political career ==
His government passed the Industrial Arbitration Act in 1901 and the Female Suffrage Act in 1902. On the other hand, poor economic conditions and drought forced the government to abandon an ambitious public works program. Failing health and the death of his wife in March 1904 compelled him to retire in June.

== Death ==
See is buried in the Church of England section of what was then known as Long Bay Cemetery (now Randwick cemetery) along with members of his family including his wife Charlotte who died 3 years before him; infant children Percy aged 10 weeks, John Bruce aged 13 months, along with a grandson named Charles Bryen, the youngest son of John Charles Matthews See and his wife Constance L. née Bryen. John Charles Matthews See is also named here, after he died in 1932.

His youngest son Lieutenant Sydney Matthews See, who died in World War I on 10 October 1916 and is interred at Flatiron Copse Cemetery, Mametz, Somme, France, is commemorated on the obelisk at the Randwick Cemetery as well.

== Honours ==
See was created Knight Commander of the Order of St Michael and St George in 1902. The See Parks in Grafton and Broken Hill are named after him, the one in Broken Hill being dedicated by him in 1902.

Civic and party political offices
Civic offices
Preceded by George Wall	Mayor of Randwick; 1880 – 1881	Succeeded by Simeon Henry Pearce
Preceded by George Denning	Mayor of Randwick; 1886	Succeeded by Thomas Lowe
New South Wales Legislative Assembly
New title	Member for Grafton; 1880–1904	District abolished
Political offices
Preceded by James Norton Jr.	Postmaster-General of New South Wales; 1885	Succeeded by Daniel O'Connor
Preceded by James Brunker	Colonial Secretary of New South Wales; 1899–1904	Succeeded by John Perry
Party political offices
New political party	Leader of the Progressive Party; 1901–1904	Succeeded by Thomas Waddell
