= Task Force 72 (model boat builders) =

Task Force 72 is an international association of Radio controlled model boat builders, all building in the common scale (ratio) of 1:72 (1 inch in 1:72 equals 72 inches or 6 feet in real life).

logo of Task Force 72

== History ==
Task Force 72 originated in Australia in 1994, when a number of individuals building radio controlled models came together to form a voluntary association.

The name derives from the military term for a group of warships operating to a common purpose, a task force, and the scale of the ship models being built (1:72).

In the years since, the association has grown from a small number of model builders to several hundred currently active and former members located in Australia, the United States, United Kingdom, Canada, New Zealand and several other countries.

At this time the largest grouping of members is located within Australia, although it is hoped to grow membership internationally.

== Annual regatta ==
The Association holds an annual regatta each year, normally at Wentworth Falls Lake, located in the Blue Mountains, west of Sydney in New South Wales, Australia.

The Task Force 72 Annual Regatta is usually held in November or December of each calendar year.

Two major prizes are awarded during the Regatta:

- The Bravo Zulu Award, named for the Naval flag hoist signifying 'well done', is awarded by a reviewing officer, usually but not always a serving member of the Royal Australian Navy.
- The Wentworth Shield is awarded to the model judged best by the members of Task Force 72 attending the Regatta.

Several minor prizes are usually presented, including:

- Best Warship
- Best Non-warship
- The Newbie Award for the best first model by a member
- The Rob Sullivan Engineering Award for the most innovative engineering incorporated into a model

== Types of models constructed ==
Currently the majority of model ships owned by Task Force 72 members are military vessels however this is slowly changing as more non-warships are completed. In fact the joint winners of the Wentworth Shield for best model at the 2007 Annual Regatta were two non-warships, the lighthouse and navigation aids tender Cape Don and the USS Charles Robinson, a Liberty Ship.

Similarly, the vessel voted best model of the 2008 Annual Regatta was a United States Army hospital ship, the USAHS St Olaf which, while operated by the military, was not a warship.

Task Force 72 members have built models of a wide range of ships and submarines, ranging from 19th century cruisers to futuristic missile corvettes, from sailing ships to ballistic missile submarines. Despite the majority of ships being of military subjects merchant and passenger ships are also well represented.

All share a basic characteristic. They are built to a common scale of 1:72 and are radio controlled.

== Task Force 72 fleet composition ==
As of November 2015 the Task Force 72 "fleet" is made up of several hundred models, ranging in size from extremely large models of various aircraft carriers and battleships down to very small models of tugboats and patrol boats.

The majority of the models are of medium-sized vessels, such as destroyers and frigates, which are considered by their builders to combine a reasonable size for ease of transport and "seaworthiness", with significant scope for the incorporation of detail and providing sufficient internal volume for the mechanics of making the models operational.

== Task Force 72 Logo ==
The Task Force 72 logo comprises a stylised compass rose with an anchor superimposed on the compass rose with the words Task Force Seventy Two surrounding the design.
