= Weatherboard Inn archaelological site =

Weatherboard Inn archaeological site
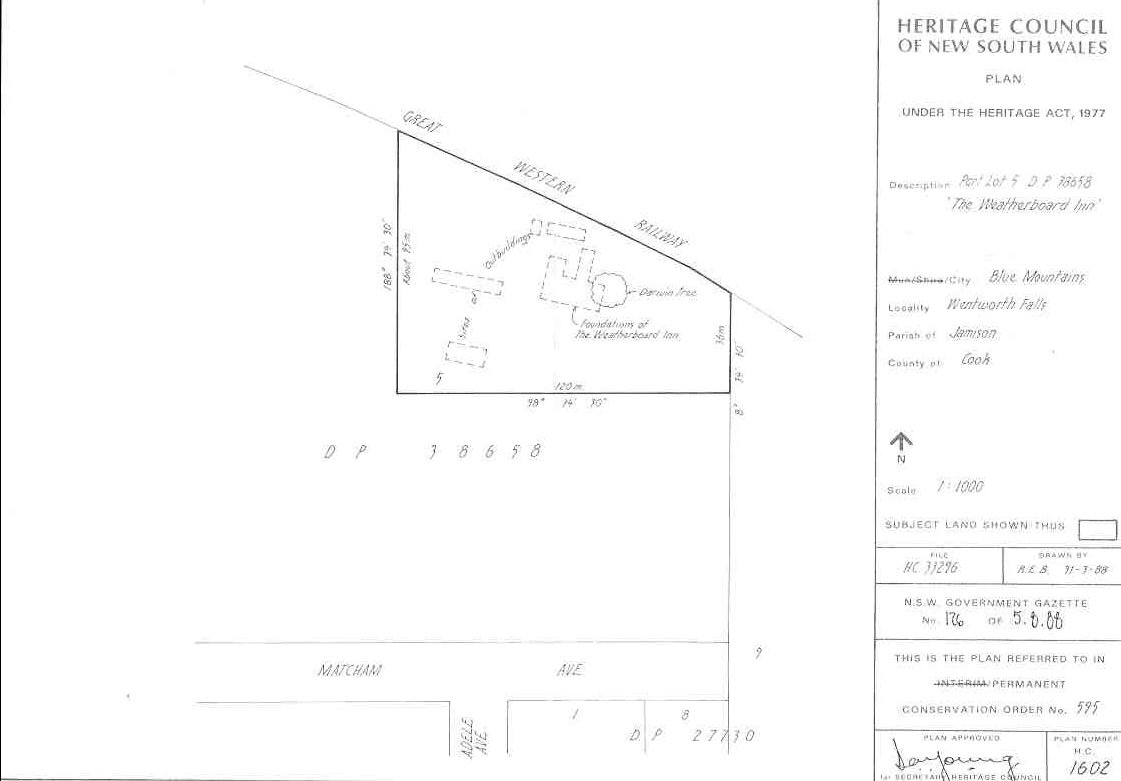
- Heritage boundaries

- Location within New South Wales Location within Australia
- 33°42′25″S 150°22′26″E
- Location: 1-15 Matcham Avenue, Wentworth Falls, City of Blue Mountains, New South Wales, Australia

History
- Built: 1814–1827

Site notes
- Owner: Blue Mountains City Council

New South Wales Heritage Register
- Official name: Weatherboard Inn Archaeological Site
- Type: State heritage (archaeological-terrestrial)
- Designated: 2 April 1999
- Reference no.: 595
- Type: Other - Transient Accommodation
- Category: Transient Accommodation

The Weatherboard Inn archaeological site is a heritage-listed former grazing ground, military post, staging inn and road building depot and now public park located at 1-15 Matcham Avenue, Wentworth Falls, City of Blue Mountains, New South Wales, Australia. It was built from 1814 to 1827. It is also known as Weatherboard Inn Archaeological Site. The property is owned by the Blue Mountains City Council. It was added to the New South Wales State Heritage Register on 2 April 1999.

== History ==
First settlement in the area was initiated by William Cox during his road construction programme over the Blue Mountains to the Western Plains.

In the immediate vicinity to the Inn site, in 1814, William Cox's second depot had been established on this site - the original weatherboard hut, built by convicts Cox had built the road over the Blue Mountains. Cox chose a site for this hut close to a stream "of excellent water". The depot was built between 1/10/1814-8/10/1814. 'The situation is very pleasant, being a ridge high enough in the front (which is due east) to overlook the standing timber altogether, and at the back there is a considerable quantity of ground without a tree, and a rivulet of fine spring water running through it. On this ground there is the grass tree and other coarse food, which the bullocks eat and fill themselves pretty well.' 'The building is 17 feet (5.2 m) x 12 feet (3.7 m) with 3 feet (0.91 m) sides, the whole weatherboarded; gable ended weatherboards and with a door on the east end (it)cost me eight men, ten days'.

This would appear to have been the first colonial building in what later became Wentworth Falls. This hut was for some time a military post with a small detachment of nine soldiers and later six mounted police were stationed there. Between 1814 and 1822 it was used as a dining room by travellers, and the site was used as a camping ground. Between the mid-1810s and 1855 the area (now Pitt Park) was used for camping and stock feeding. The area (from the present Coronation Park to Pitt Park) was used as a military camp/depot/post/lockup and stockade/site of military and police activities.

The hut evolved into a staging post for long westward journeys - Governor Macquarie used it on his journey to Bathurst in April–May 1815. It became known as a place where travelling stock could find fodder and its name of "the weatherboard hut" was shortened to "weatherboard", this even being used in official papers. The hut appears to have burnt down by c. 1823. The area was long used for camping and stock feeding.

In June 1826 Governor Darling received a request from John Mills for a small land grant in the area called the "weatherboad hut", to build an inn. He was granted one hundred acres conditional on the type of building he would build, with a liquor license for 3 years free of duty payments, and 400 acres of more fertile land elsewhere.

The Weatherboard Inn itself appears to have begun construction shortly before 1827. By 1829 Mills reported he had completed construction of a substantial dwelling place, consisting of two sitting rooms, six bedrooms, a seven stall stable, sheepfold, a paddock for horned cattle and horses and other outbuildings.

Mills was granted 40 hectares (100 acres) by Governor Darling (portion 11, Parish of Jamison, County of Cook) in 1829, the same year he completed the Inn. By June 1829 Mill's establishment and the 40 hectares (100 acres) were sold at public auction to satisfy debts. The new owner was Alexander Fraser, who stated that he finished the construction of the inn and demanded the additional 160 hectares (400 acres) promised to Mills. Following some wrangling the land was eventually given to George Innes who had financed Mills in erecting the inn.

After the final settlement the inn passed through a number of hands, both owners and licensees. In 1833 the first license was issued and the Inn named "The Bathurst Traveller". c. 1835 Fraser sold the inn to William Boyles, who held it "at least from 1835 until his death in 1842." In 1836 English naturalist Charles Darwin stayed at the Inn. At the time Darwin was on board HMS Beagle making a world tour under Captain Fitzroy, mapping latitudes. Darwin was 26. He lunched at the Weatherboard Inn on his way west to Bathurst in January 1836, sidetracked along what is now called the Charles Darwin Walk to view the Jamison Valley. On his return trip from Bathurst to Sydney, Darwin stayed again three nights, during which time he again walked to admire the view from the top of the Wentworth Falls.

An 1839 advertisement for the Inn's lease noted "a large establishment, including 3 parlours, 7 bedrooms, kitchen, taproom, bar, stores and stabling for 17 horses, as well as a large and well stocked garden, furniture and stock'.

Descriptions of 1839 indicate a large and successful operation, famous as "the weatherboard inn", with three parlours, seven bedrooms, kitchen, taproom and bar, stores and suitable stabling for 17 horses, and a large and well stocked garden. The inn was a stage for early coach lines including Cobb & Co.

In 1840 the inn was purchased by William Boyles and willed to his daughter in 1842. That same year she married Edward Dougherty, and the estate remained with them until 1896. In 1847 it was renamed "the Weatherboard Inn". In 1855 the military camp/depot/lockup was moved/ transferred to 18 Mile Hollow (Woodford).

With the coming of the railway line (an 1862 railway survey plan showed the inn; the railway line to Weatherboard opened in 1867, and the line to Mount Victoria opened in 1868) and subsequent decline in road traffic the Inn appears to have gone out of business. There is some possibility that the inn may have subsequently been occupied by a C. A. Wilson while he established an accommodation house near the railway platform, or that it was used as additional accommodation to this building, but this is speculative at best.

After 1867 the Inn's history is obscure, it is not even certain when or how the buildings were destroyed or demolished. In 1877 George Matcham Pitt acquired nearby land, and in 1888 he conveyed the acreage to his son, Robert Matcham Pitt.

It was not until 1879 that certain features (e.g.: the "weatherboard" railway, post office etc.) were renamed "Wentworth Falls". it appears that part of the inn was destroyed by fire in the later 19th century.

In 1889 Coorah was built.

The inn was purchased by Robert Jones in 1894. In 1896 the land was bought by a Mr Pitt who, earlier had established a home and gardens in the near vicinity. He commenced damming part of the creek to allow water supply to his gardens. That same year the town's name was officially changed to Wentworth Falls.

In 1914 the land began to be subdivided. Mrs Marie Pitt gave the lot on which the School of Arts now stands to the Trustees of the Wentworth Falls Literary Institute, and other portions were given to her daughters.

In 1934 Mr R. M. Pitt gave one lot (#5) (10 acres, 1 rood, 17 perch) to the Blue Mountains City Council for dedication as parkland. In 1935 the land that became Pitt Park was donated to Council for public use in 1935 (possibly under the terms of the will of RM Pitt). These were the primary portions containing the old inn site. The park was named Pitt Park. Parts of it were developed as sports fields. The remainder of the 40 hectares (100 acres) grant for the inn, south of the railway, is gradually being acquired by Blue Mountains City Council for open space.

In 1936 the Naturalist Society planted an evergreen/holm/holly oak (Quercus ilex) on the site, to commemorate the centenary of the visit and stay in the inn of English naturalist, Charles Darwin. This tree is separately recognised on the Blue Mountains Register of Significant Trees.

Adjoining lots (6 & 7) which had passed into the hands of Mrs Effie Mathews and Mrs S. A. Smith were also given to Council to incorporate into the park, "for the purposes of recreation". These were three separate land owners (donating land), two of whose land being the primary portions containing the old inn site.

In 1940 Effie Matthews agreed to convey to Council in fee simple 4 acres, 33 perches being portion 6 of William Boyle's 100 acre grant (portion 11) Parish of Jamison, County of Cook. That same year Murial Smith agreed to convey to Council in fee simple also. The park was named Pitt Park, after Robert Matcham Pitt (1849-1935).

The land containing the remains is now part of Pitt Park, a Council owned park.

In 1952 the Blue Mountains Historical Society unveiled a bronze plaque attached to a large stone as a memorial to the "weatherboard" on the site. It appears that by 1967 this plaque had been stolen, as were others in the Blue Mountains. BMHS requested that Council fence the site to protect it, and Council declining, the BMHS removed the stone to the grounds of its museum. A concrete slab remains on site in which the stone had formerly been set.

In 1985 the site came to the Heritage Council's attention when Blue Mountains City Council began removing gravel from Pitt Park to use in road building, when workers uncovered sandstone blocks and bricks. Further work resulted in the uncovering of artefacts including bricks, coins, bottles, a clay pipe, crockery and a bobbin commemorating Queen Victoria's coronation in 1830. Work ceased and an archaeological excavation was undertaken along with historical study. Finding the site significant, sand was dumped on it to cap the remains and protect them from weathering and vandalism.

== Description ==
An archaeological site within Pitt Park, Matcham Avenue, Wentworth Falls, containing remains of a former (1827) inn, former Cox's depot (c. 1814 weatherboard hut).

Site also contains a 1936 memorial tree, a holm/evergreen/holly oak (Quercus ilex), planted by the Naturalist Society of NSW in 1936 to commemorate the visit and stay in the Inn in 1836 of British naturalist Charles Darwin.

=== Modifications and dates ===
- 1985 excavation by BMCC for gravel deposits.

== Heritage listing ==
As at 30 December 2003, this site has considerable local, regional and national significance exemplifying the reasons for the development of the Blue Mountains area and as part of the great outward expansion of the colony during the early decades of the 19th century.

The site has strong associations with significant historical figures such as Charles Darwin and assistant surveyors Govett and Hay. It exemplifies a strong social factor of the early colony; the transitory state of the population between home, work and institutional places requiring rest stops such as this former inn.

There is strong scientific and research potential in this site if significant sections of the original and developed inn complex are still intact. Building techniques and materials from an early period of the colony's development, local technical variations and materials exploitation, dependence on Sydney supplies and the organisation of a large inn site are all research themes that could be explored

Much of the place now known as Pitt Park was cleared in the mid-late 1810s and used as a camping area and stockade by the military and travellers. This place, along with an area from Wentworth Falls Railway Station, through Coronation Park and the shopping centre, played an integral role in the colonisation of NSW, particularly in the development of the road across the Blue Mountains to the west.

The place was also crucial in the development of the location of Wentworth Falls. From the time William Cox established a depot in 1814 just to the east of what is now Pitt Park, the place became the nucleus of what was to become the town of Wentworth Falls. The depot was close to the current location of the railway station, and the swamp to the west became a feedlot for stock, and the surrounding grounds a camping area. The Weatherboard Inn was subsequently established on the west side of the swamp in the late 1820s and the surrounding area was used as a military depot and camping area for another 30–40 years.

Half of Pitt Park is now a significant recreation area, and Pitt Park is an important community resource for residents and visitors. (abrided overview of significance, Blue Mountains City Council, 2004)

The Weatherboard Inn archaelological site was listed on the New South Wales State Heritage Register on 2 April 1999.
