= Wentworth Falls, New South Wales =

Wentworth Falls
- Suburb
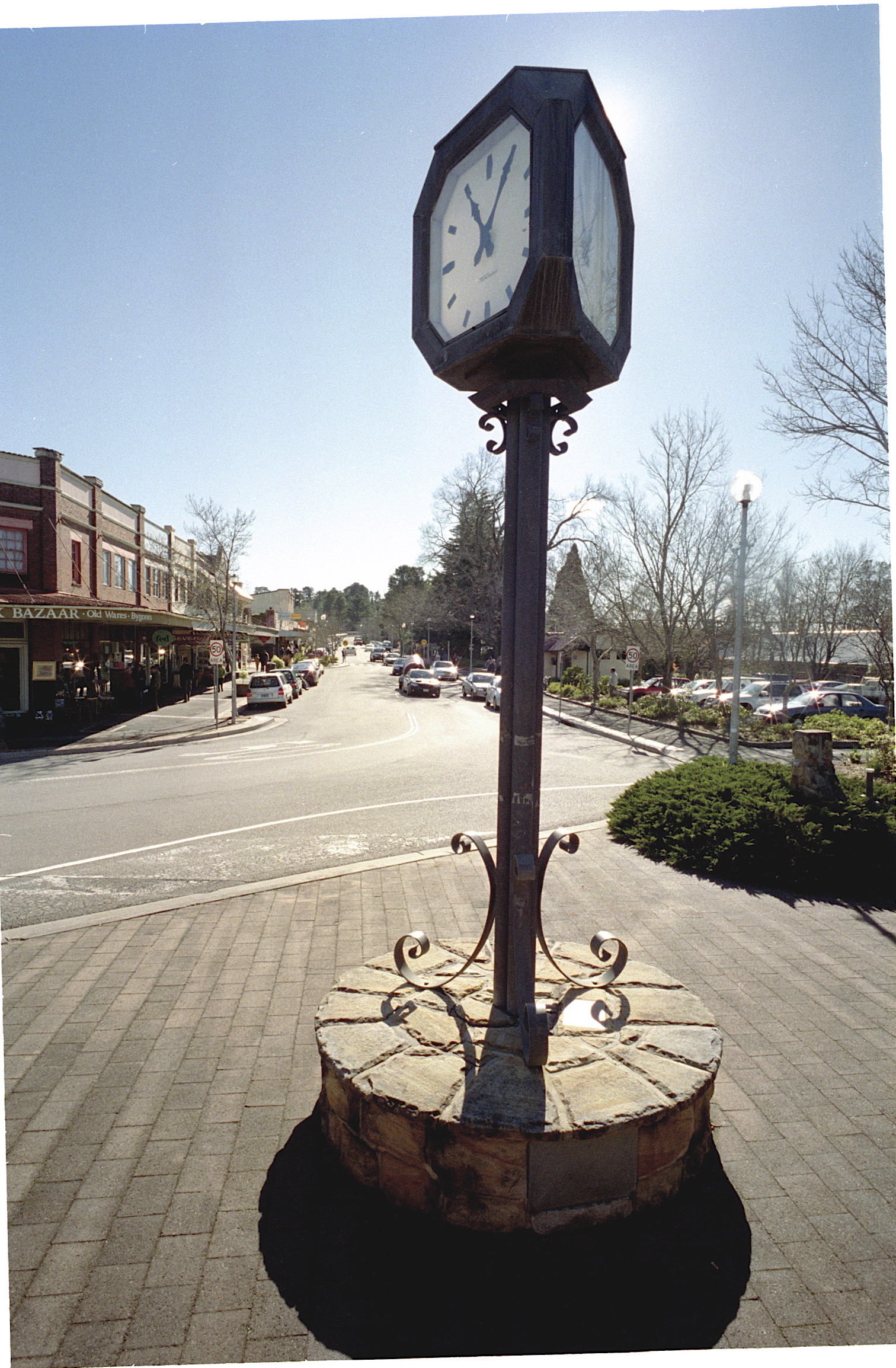
- Station Street

- Interactive map of Wentworth Falls
- Coordinates: 33°43′S 150°22′E
- Country: Australia
- State: New South Wales
- LGA: City of Blue Mountains
- Location: 97 km (60 mi) W of Sydney CBD; 8 km (5.0 mi) E of Katoomba

Government
  - State electorate: Blue Mountains
  - Federal division: Macquarie
- Elevation: 872 m (2,861 ft)

Population
  - Total: 6,428 (2021 census)
- Postcode: 2782
Suburbs around Wentworth Falls
Leura	Blue Mountains National Park	Blue Mountains National Park
Leura	Wentworth Falls	Bullaburra
Leura	Jamison Valley	Bullaburra

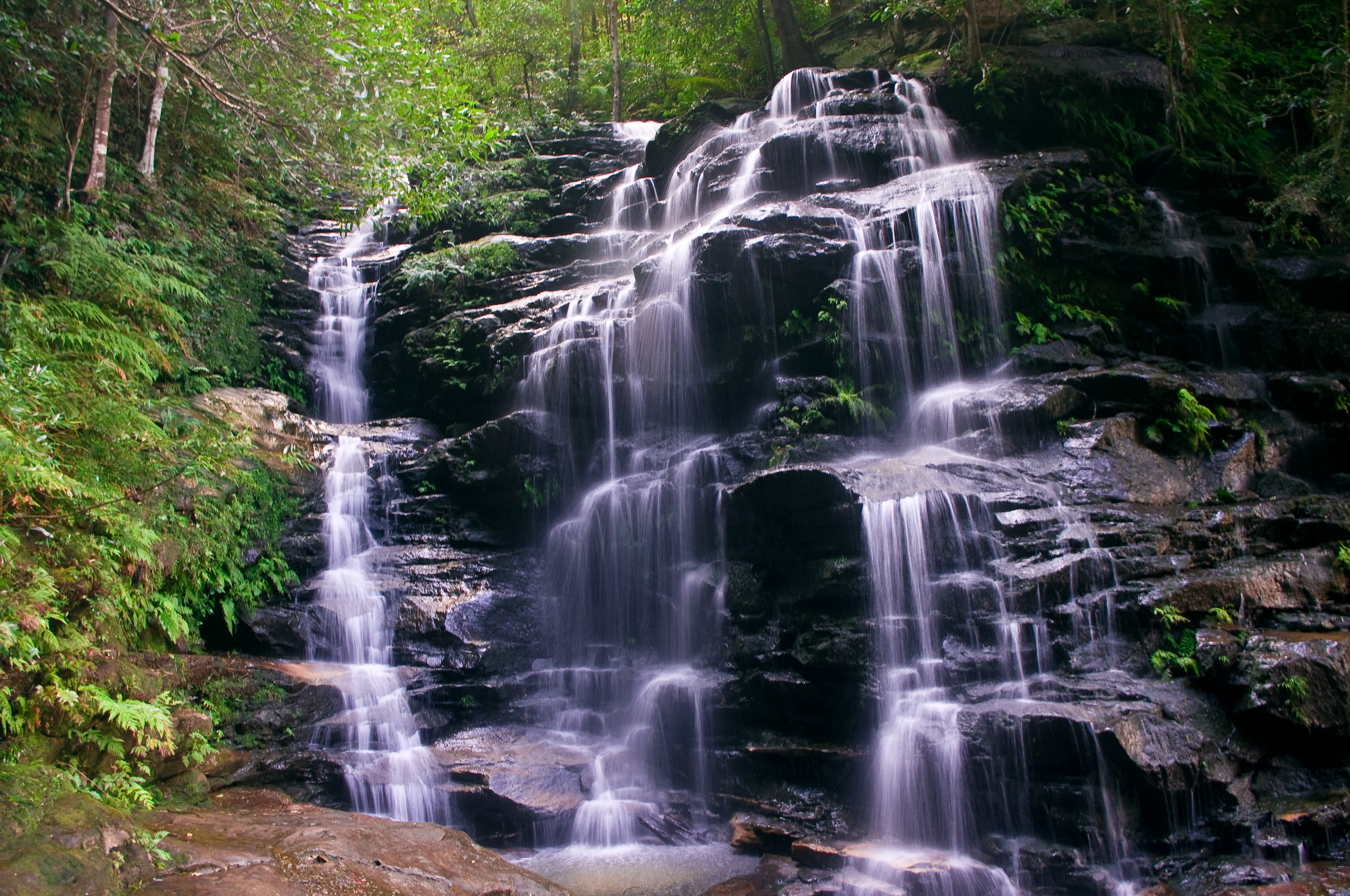
Sylvia Falls in the Valley of the Waters

Wentworth Falls (postcode: 2782) is a town in the Blue Mountains region of New South Wales, situated approximately 100 kilometres (62 mi) west of the Sydney central business district, and about 8 kilometres (5.0 mi) east of Katoomba, Australia on the Great Western Highway, with a Wentworth Falls railway station on the Main Western line. The town is at an elevation of 867 metres (2,844 ft) AHD. At the 2016 census, Wentworth Falls had a population of 6,076.

Wentworth Falls hosts several festivals and events, including the Wentworth Falls Autumn Festival in April, the Wentworth Falls Public School Art and Craft Show in October and the Task Force 72 Annual Regatta in either November or December. Wentworth Falls is home to WFCC or Wentworth Falls Cricket Club. Established in 1892 it is one of the Blue Mountains' longest serving cricket clubs.

== History ==
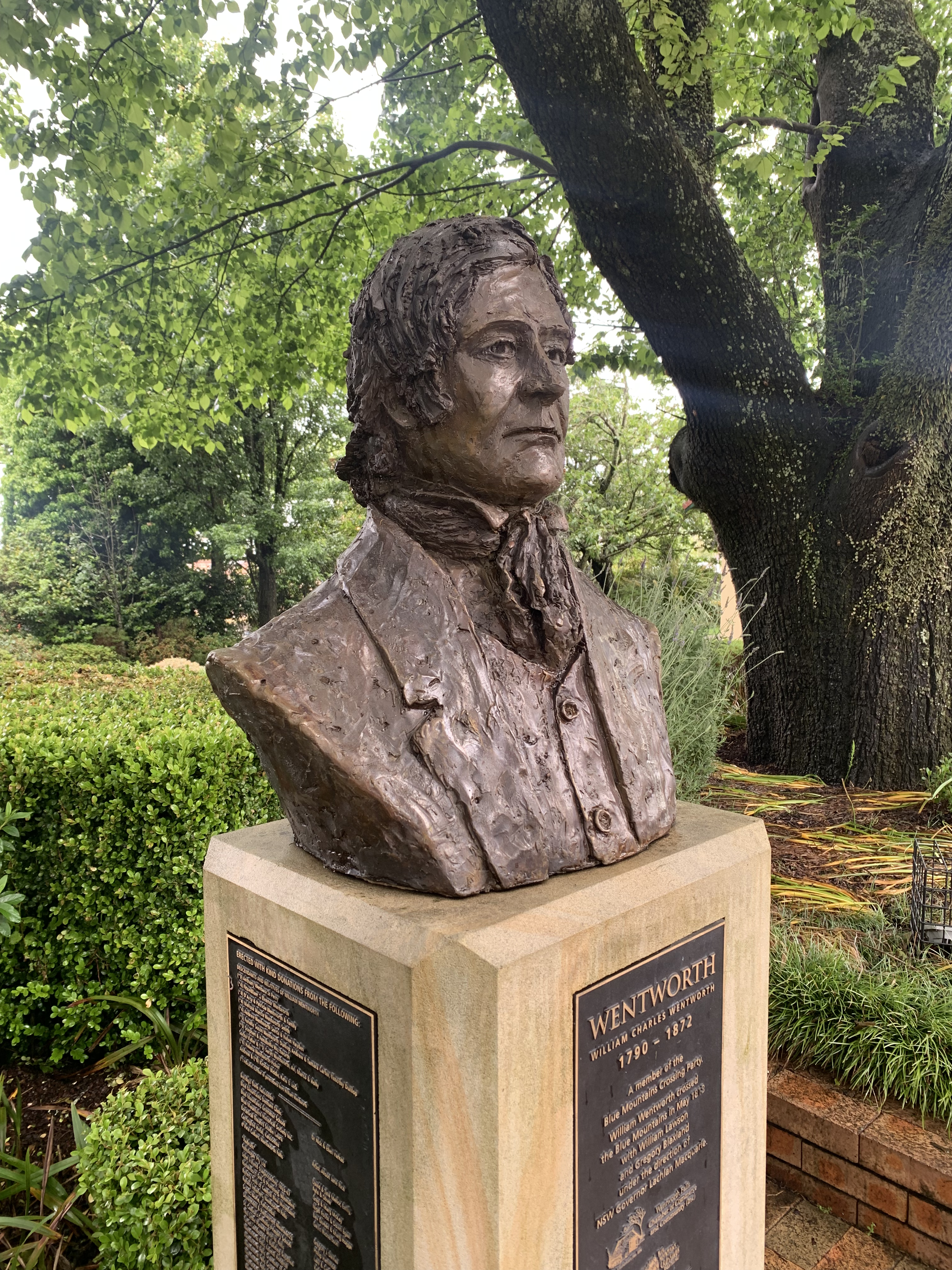
Bust of statesman and explorer William Charles Wentworth, namesake of the town

Kings Tableland, a plateau located at the south-east corner of Wentworth Falls, contains areas of major archaeological importance, including the Kings Tableland Aboriginal Site. This area is highly significant to the Gandangara, Darug and Wiradjuri people. Used as a gathering place for at least 22,000 years, the area contains a variety of cultural features, including engravings, axe-grinding grooves, modified rock pools and an occupation shelter.

Originally called The Weatherboard after the 'Weatherboard Inn' built in 1814, a year later the town was named Jamison’s Valley by Governor Lachlan Macquarie in honour of the colony's leading private citizen, Sir John Jamison. In July 1867, the first railway journey to the Blue Mountains left Penrith and traveled through to Weatherboard Station, where the train terminated. In 1879, the village took its name from a nearby system of waterfalls, which in turn were named for William Charles Wentworth, one of the men that headed the exploration to cross the mountains in 1813 and a friend of John Jamison.

On the north side of the town is Pitt Park. The Bathurst Traveller, later renamed Weatherboard Inn, was built here in 1826. Charles Darwin was reported to have stayed there in 1836, walking from the inn along Jamison Creek to the cliff's edge, about which he wrote 'an immense gulf unexpectedly opens through the trees, with a depth of perhaps 1,500 feet'. The route he took was formally opened as the Charles Darwin Walk in 1986 and leads from Wilson Park opposite the School of Arts building to the northern escarpment of the Jamison Valley.

The Kings Tableland area also once hosted a deer park that closed down in the late 1980s, with the site subsequently falling into private ownership. Several deer were sighted around the area for some time until they were culled by NSW National Parks & Wildlife Service rangers. This area is also home to the site of the former Queen Victoria Sanitorium, once a major facility for the treatment of tuberculosis. Ownership of the site has shifted between Government and various private interests over the decades since it was closed in the 1980s. Sporadic development proposals for the former hospital have been the source of some local concern.

== Heritage listings ==
Wentworth Falls has a number of heritage-listed sites, including:

- Blue Mountains National Park: Blue Mountains walking tracks
- 63-67 Falls Road: Davisville, Wentworth Falls
- 1-15 Matcham Avenue: Weatherboard Inn archaeological site
- 'La Vista', 65 Blaxland Road, Wentworth Falls.

=== Library School of Arts ===
The Literary Institute at 217 Great Western Highway, Wentworth Falls, was designed in 1915 by architect Herbert Dennis and is now known as the Library and School of Arts.

== Population ==
According to the 2016 census of Population, there were 6,076 people in Wentworth Falls.

- Aboriginal and Torres Strait Islander people made up 2.0% of the population.
- 74.9% of people were born in Australia. The next most common countries of birth were England 6.5% and New Zealand 1.7%.
- 88.2% of people spoke only English at home.
- The most common responses for religion were No Religion 38.5%, Catholic 18.4% and Anglican 17.1%.

== Tourism ==
Ingar Camp Ground, one of the most scenic picnic grounds in the Blue Mountains, is eight kilometres further east along Murphys Fire Trail. Further south along Kings Tableland are Sunset Lookout and McMahon's Lookout, both of which provide long views over Lake Burragorang. These roads went into the Burragorang Valley prior to the valley's flooding by Warragamba Dam.

Other points of interest and local institutions include the historic Grand View Hotel, the historic house Glen Isla, the Wentworth Falls School of Arts, Falls Gallery, located on Falls Road close to the Falls themselves, showing some of the major contemporary Australian artists. The Kedumba Gallery (found within the grounds of the Blue Mountains Grammar School) and Wentworth Falls Lake, an artificial lake created early in the 20th century to provide water for steam locomotives. This is now a reserve and recreation area. The School of Arts is a popular venue for local community events and theatre productions and also houses the local library. Another landmark is Yester Grange, a heritage-listed home in Yester Street. A sprawling timber bungalow with extensive verandas, Yester Grange had a number of owners over the years but eventually became a function centre.

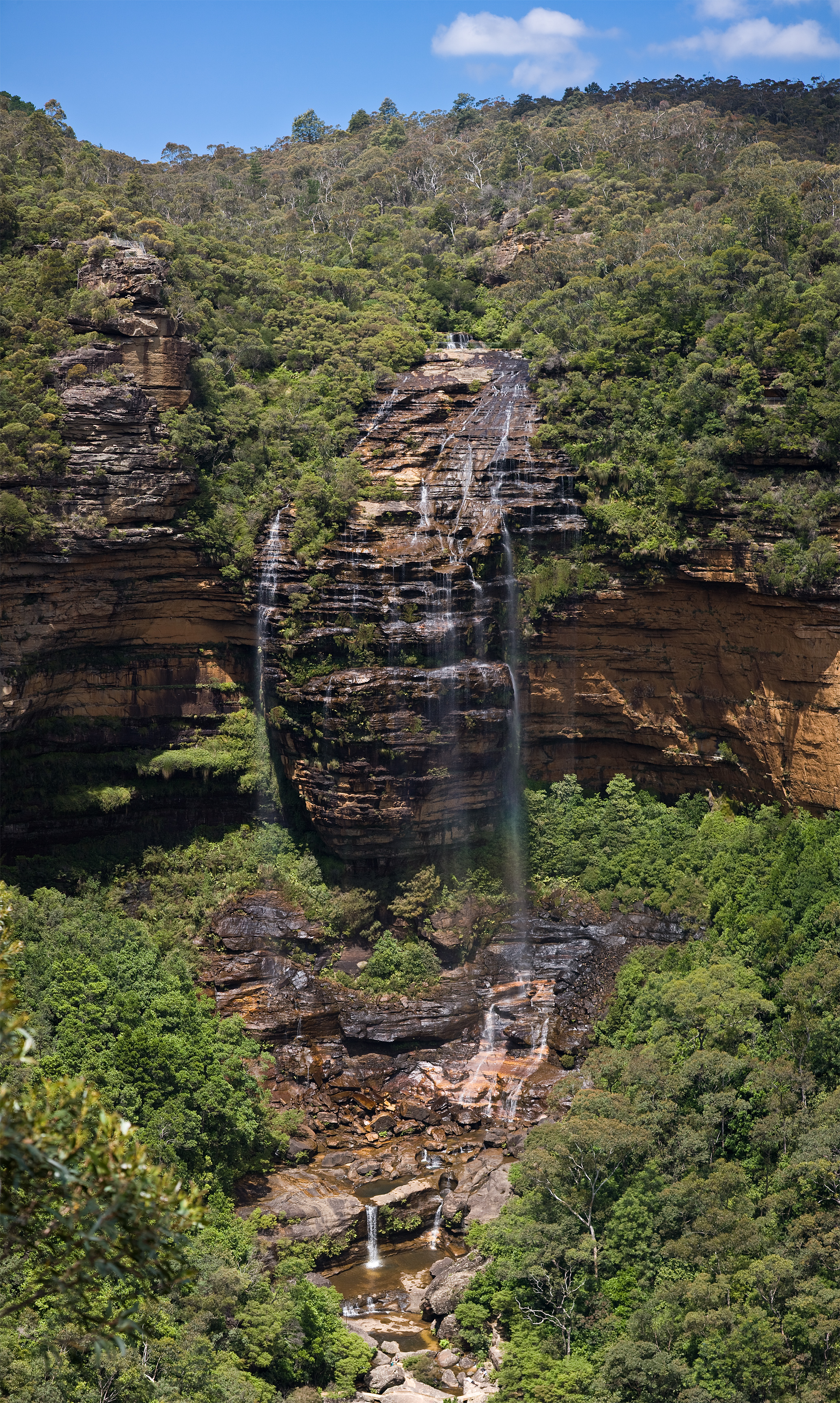
Upper Wentworth Falls as viewed along the National Pass walking track in the Jamison Valley

There are many natural lookouts in the area including Lincoln's Rock, Breakfast Point Lookout, Princes Rock Lookout, Wentworth Falls Lookout and Rocket Point Lookout. A track through the Valley of the Waters leads to Empress Falls, Sylvia Falls, Lodore Falls, Flat Rock Falls and, near the junction of Jamison and Valley of the Waters Creeks, the sheltered Vera Falls via an unmarked offbranching track, 1.9 kilometres (1.2 mi), from the Conservation Hut at the start of the walk. Empress Falls is one of the most popular beginner commercial canyoning trips in the Blue Mountains, and canyoners can be seen abseiling Empress Falls from the tourist track

One of the most popular walks in the area, the National Pass, skirts the top edge of the Valley of the Waters, along a narrow clay stone ledge perched halfway down the cliff, and then ascends the ridge via a series of sandstone steps built by Peter Mulheran and a group known as "The Irish Brigade" in 1908. The Conservation Hut is an information centre and restaurant in Wentworth Falls leased from the NSW National Parks & Wildlife Service, and serves as a starting point for several of these walks.

== Gallery ==
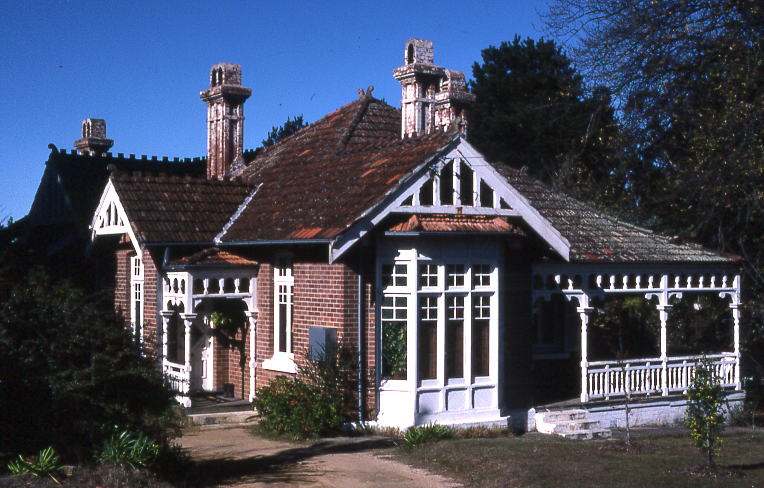
Strathmore, a heritage-listed Federation Queen Anne cottage in Falls Road

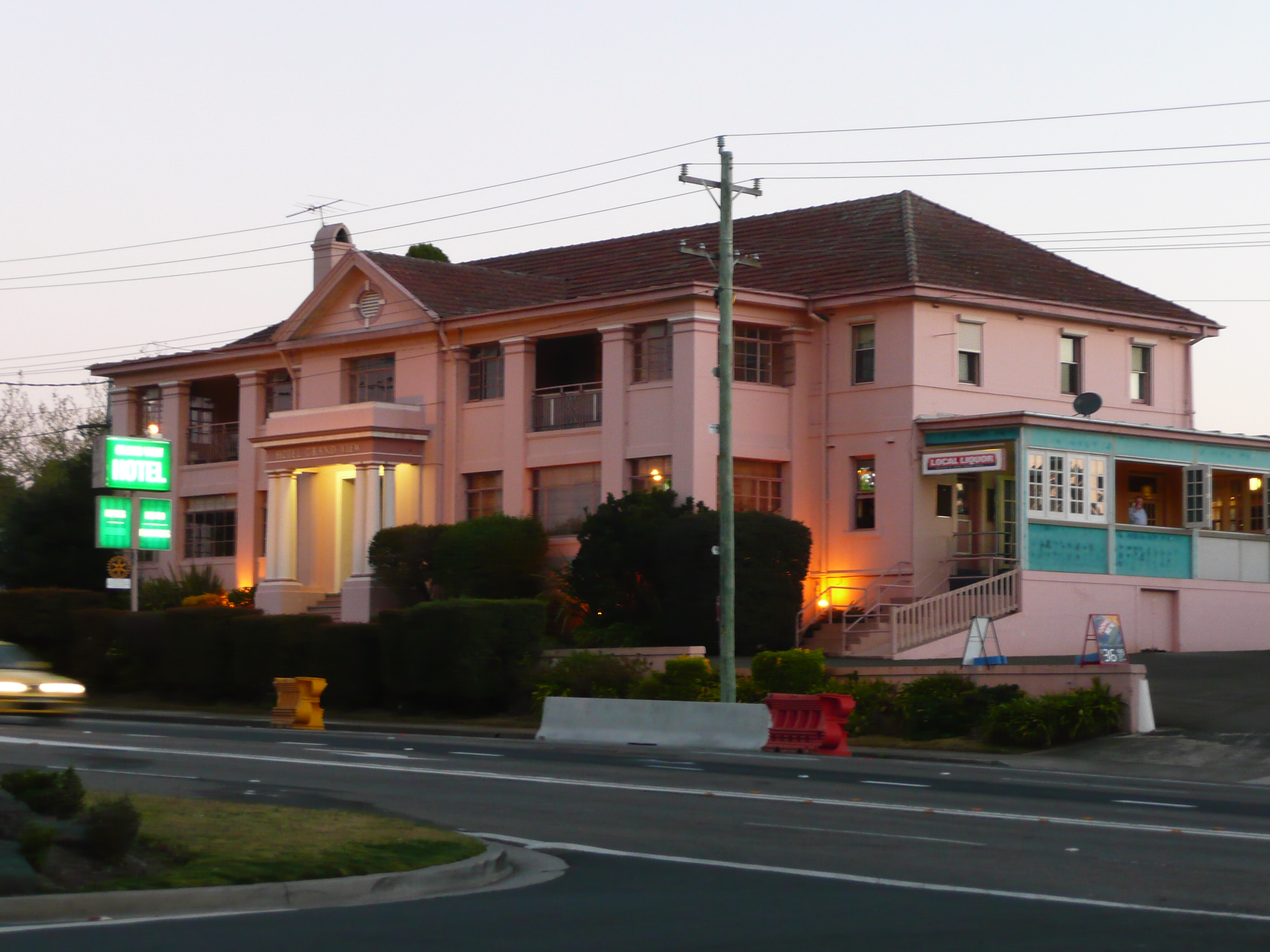
Grand View Hotel

Cascades along Jamison Creek, Wentworth Falls

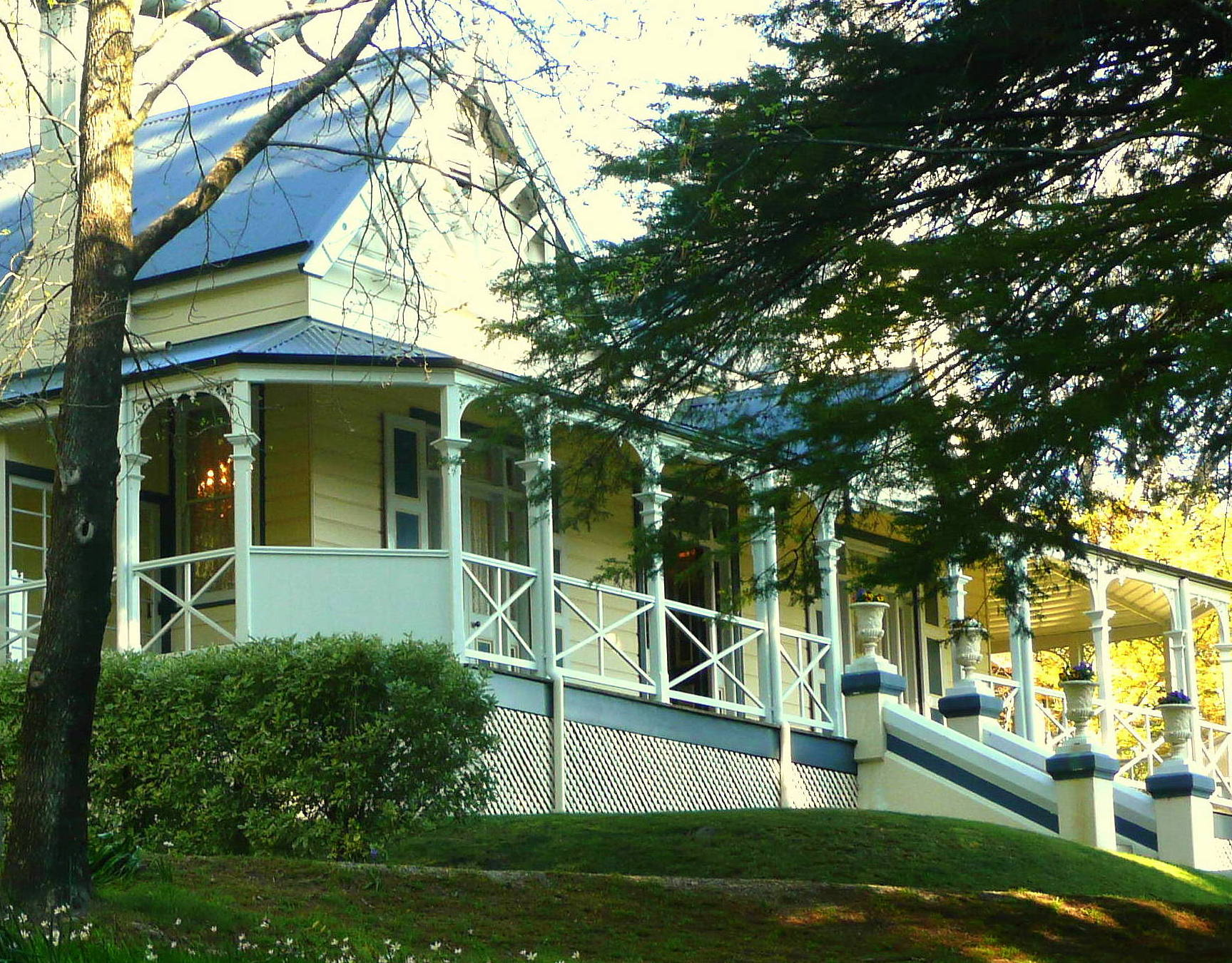
Yester Grange

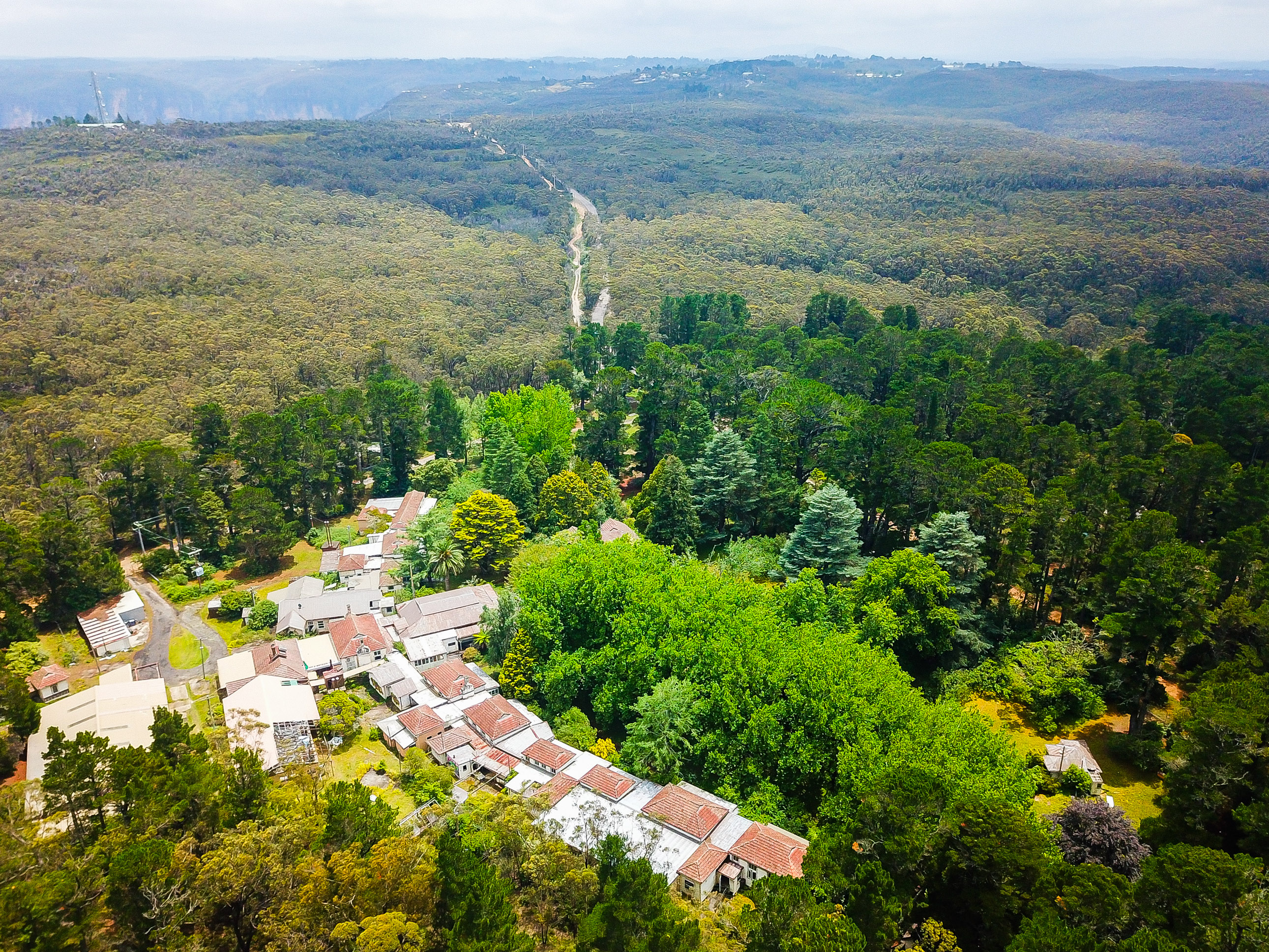
Aerial View Queen Victoria Sanitorium Wentworth Falls NSW

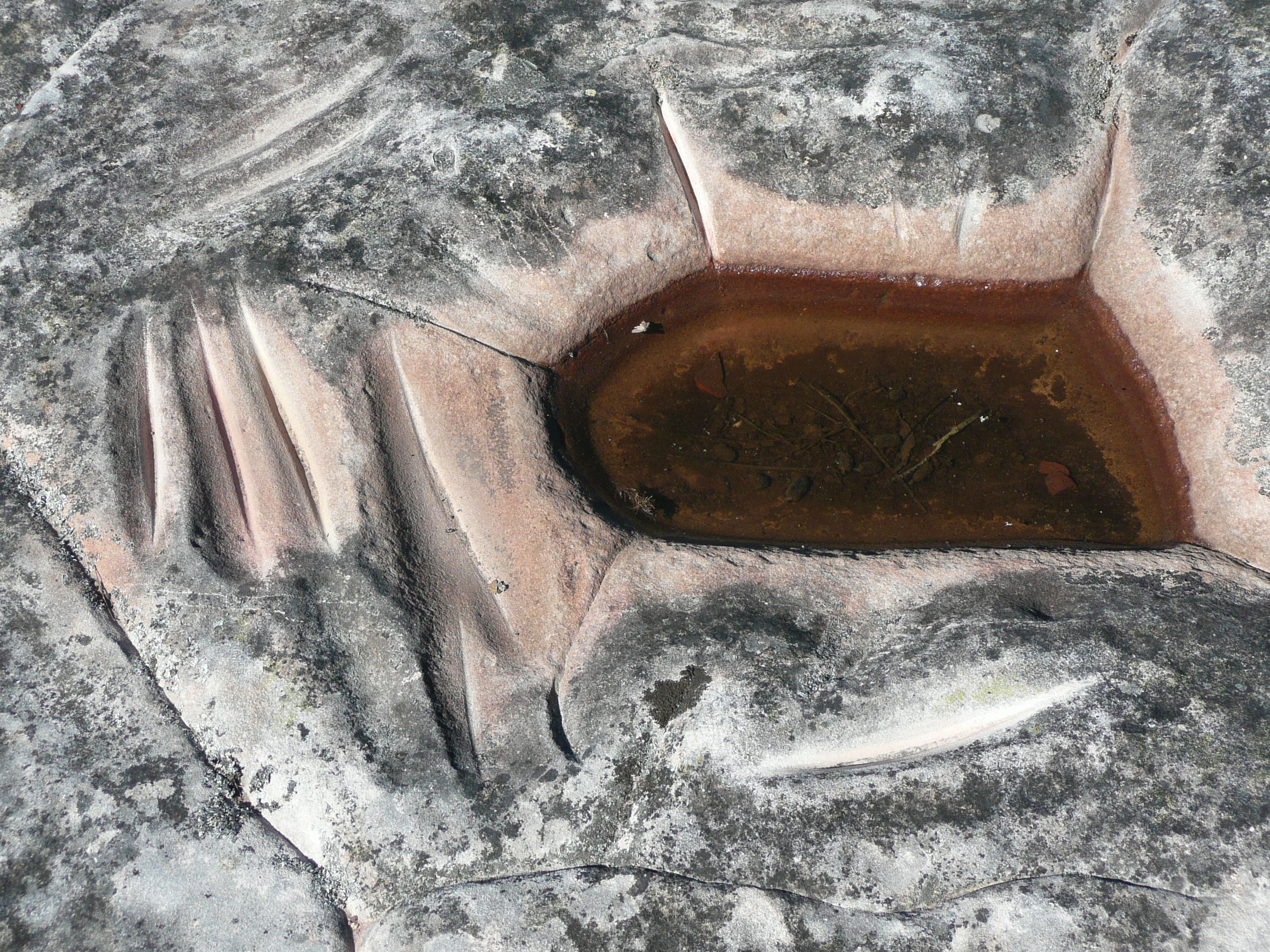
Grinding grooves, Kings Tableland Aboriginal Site

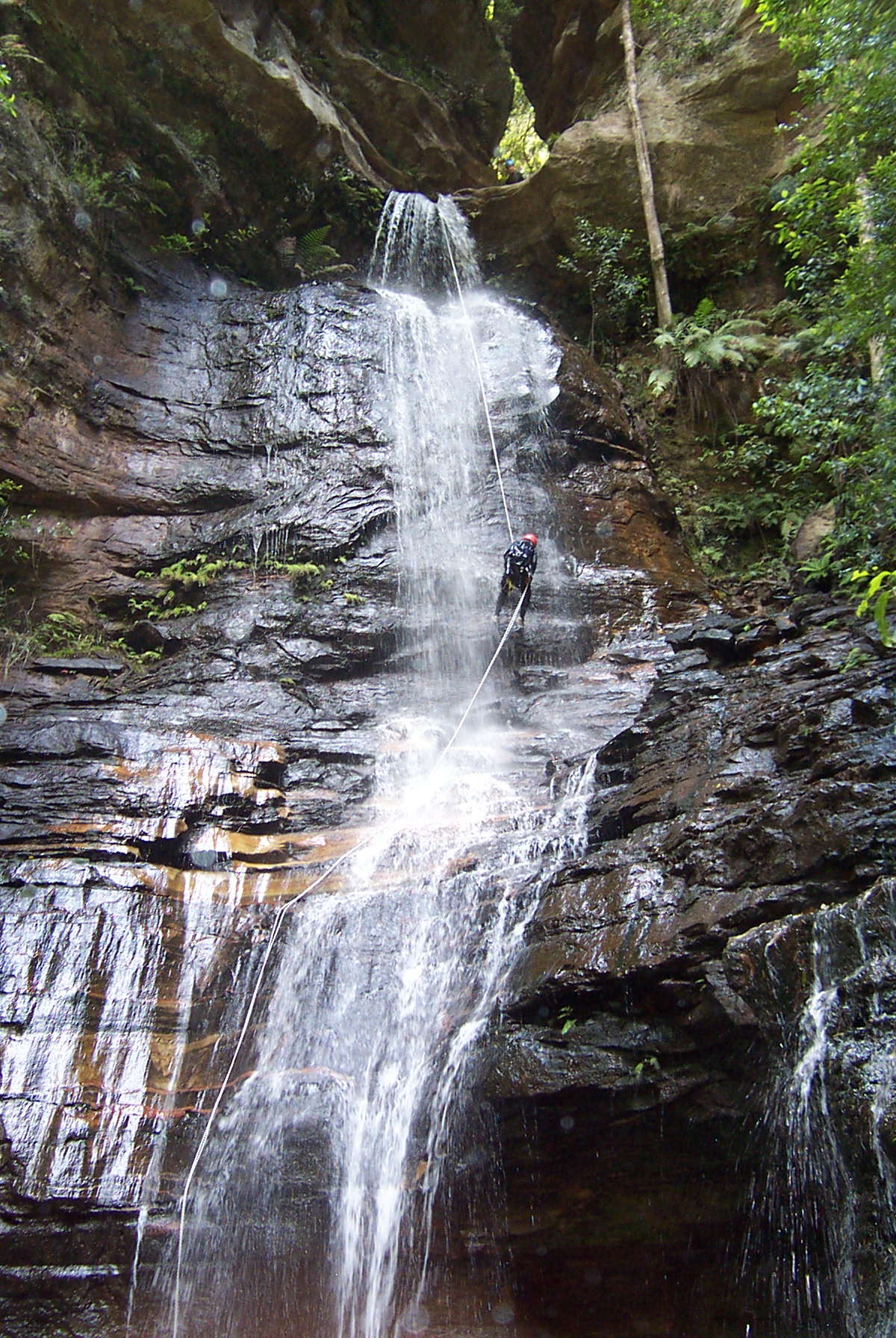
Empress Falls (with Canyoner Abseiling), Valley of the Waters, Blue Mountains

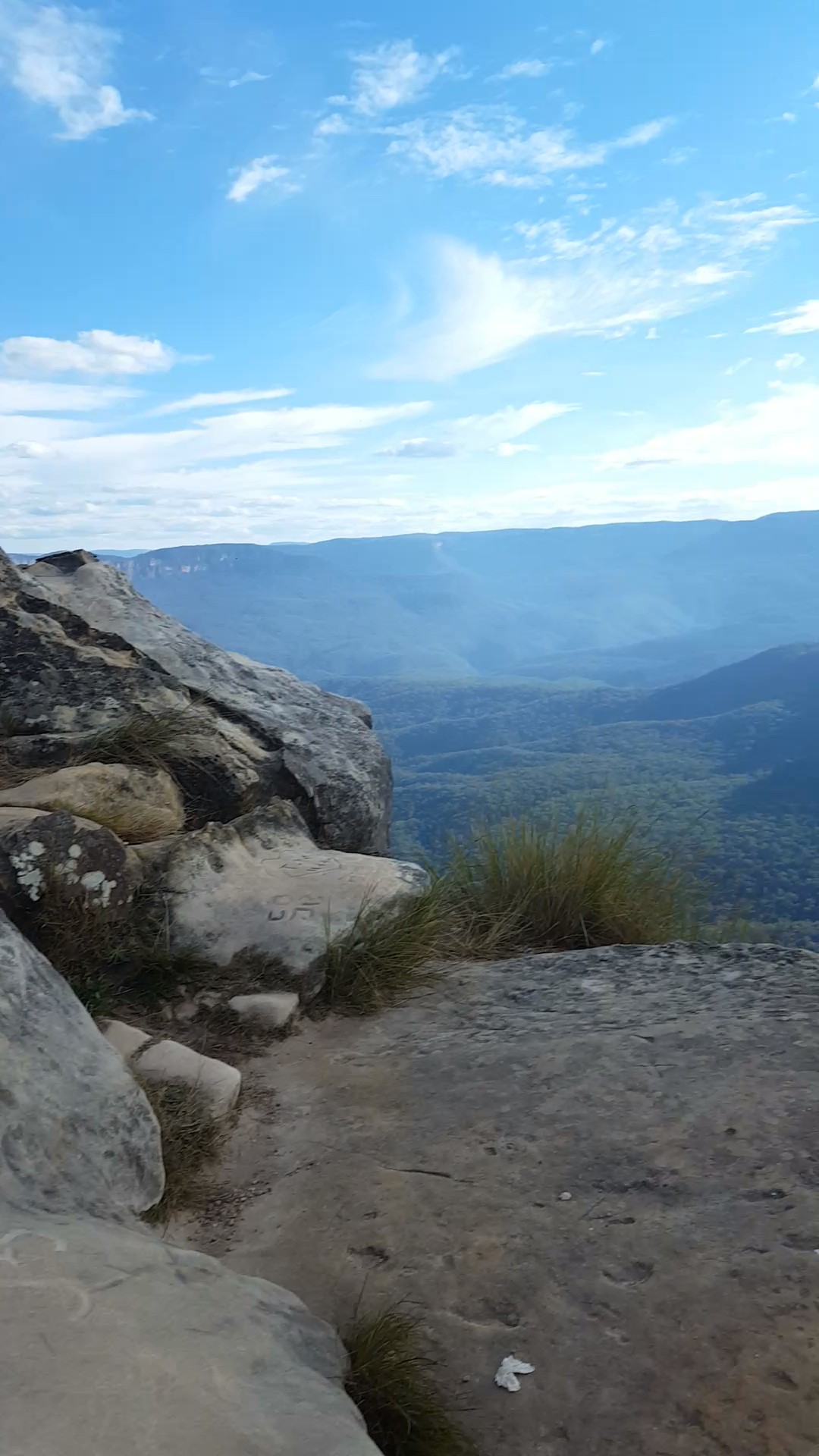
Lincoln's Rock, April 2024

== Notable residents ==
- Reg Livermore – noted actor and playwright

== See also ==
- List of waterfalls
- List of waterfalls in Australia
