= Electoral results for the district of Illawarra =

Election results for Illawarra, New South Wales, Australia

Illawarra, an electoral district of the Legislative Assembly in the Australian state of New South Wales, has had three incarnations, the first from 1859 to 1904, the second from 1927 to 1968 and the third from 1971 to 2007.

Election	Member	Party		
1859	John Hargrave	None		
1859 by	Samuel Gordon	None		
1860	Robert Haworth	None		
1864	Patrick Osborne	None		
1866 by	John Stewart	None		
1869	James Osborne	None		
1872	William Forster	None		
1874	Samuel Gray	None		
1877	Samuel Gray	None		
1880 by	Alexander Stuart	None		
1880	Alexander Stuart	None		
1882	Alexander Stuart	None		
1885	Andrew Lysaght Sr.	None		
1887	Francis Woodward	Free Trade	Member	Party
1889	Francis Woodward	Free Trade	Joseph Mitchell	Free Trade
1891	Andrew Lysaght, Sr.	Protectionist	John Nicholson	Labor
1891 by	Archibald Campbell	Protectionist	John Nicholson	Labor
1894	Archibald Campbell	Free Trade		
1895	Archibald Campbell	Free Trade		
1898	Archibald Campbell	Free Trade		
1901	Archibald Campbell	Liberal Reform		
1904 by	Edward Allen	Liberal Reform		
Election	Member	Party		
1927	Andrew Lysaght Jr.	Labor		
1930	Billy Davies	Labor		
1932	Billy Davies	Labor		
1935	Billy Davies	Labor		
1938	Billy Davies	Labor		
1941	Howard Fowles	Labor		
1944	Howard Fowles	Labor		
1947	Howard Fowles	Labor		
1950	Howard Fowles	Labor		
1953	Howard Fowles	Labor		
1956	Howard Fowles	Labor		
1959	Howard Fowles	Labor		
1962	Howard Fowles	Labor		
1965	Howard Fowles	Labor		
Election	Member	Party		
1971	George Petersen	Labor		
1973	George Petersen	Labor		
1976	George Petersen	Labor		
1978	George Petersen	Labor		
1981	George Petersen	Labor		
1984	George Petersen	Labor / Illawarra Workers		
1988	Terry Rumble	Labor		
1991	Terry Rumble	Labor		
1995	Terry Rumble	Labor		
1999	Marianne Saliba	Labor		
2003	Marianne Saliba	Labor		

== Election results ==
=== Elections in the 2000s ===
==== 2003 ====
2003 New South Wales state election: Illawarra
Party	Candidate	Votes	%	±%
Labor	Marianne Saliba	23,270	55.7	+4.9
Liberal	Benjamin Caldwell	6,372	15.3	−0.9
Greens	Margaret Johanson	4,270	10.2	+5.6
Christian Democrats	Richard Harris	1,973	4.7	−2.2
Independent	Barry Hennessy	1,848	4.4	+4.4
Independent	Charles Mifsud	1,643	3.9	+3.9
One Nation	Robert Kennedy	1,149	2.8	−6.1
Against Further Immigration	John Cipov	588	1.4	−0.2
Independent	Bill Heycott	465	1.1	+1.1
Socialist Alliance	Chris Williams	187	0.4	+0.4
Total formal votes		41,765	96.3	−0.9
Informal votes		1,612	3.7	+0.9
Turnout		43,377	94.0	
Two-party-preferred result
Labor	Marianne Saliba	26,135	74.8	+2.0
Liberal	Benjamin Caldwell	8,808	25.2	−2.0
Labor hold		Swing	+2.0	

=== Elections in the 1990s ===
==== 1999 ====
1999 New South Wales state election: Illawarra
Party	Candidate	Votes	%	±%
Labor	Marianne Saliba	20,370	50.8	−8.3
Liberal	Kosta Jordan	6,492	16.2	−9.1
One Nation	Ivan Prsa	3,576	8.9	+8.9
Christian Democrats	Brian Hughes	2,759	6.9	−0.1
Democrats	Penny Bartholomew	2,017	5.0	−3.6
Greens	Jane Andersen	1,865	4.6	+4.6
Independent	Roger Mason	1,850	4.6	+4.6
Against Further Immigration	Francis Green	656	1.6	+1.6
Democratic Socialist	Margaret Perrott	336	0.8	+0.8
Non-Custodial Parents	Stephen Blayney	208	0.5	+0.5
Total formal votes		40,129	97.2	+3.7
Informal votes		1,160	2.8	−3.7
Turnout		41,289	94.7	
Two-party-preferred result
Labor	Marianne Saliba	22,848	72.8	+5.1
Liberal	Kosta Jordan	8,554	27.2	−5.1
Labor hold		Swing	+5.1	

==== 1995 ====
1995 New South Wales state election: Illawarra
Party	Candidate	Votes	%	±%
Labor	Terry Rumble	20,893	62.3	+1.0
Liberal	Sturt Guinness	7,620	22.7	−1.0
Democrats	Bob Patrech	2,792	8.3	−1.6
Call to Australia	Brian Hughes	2,243	6.7	+1.7
Total formal votes		33,548	93.2	−2.5
Informal votes		2,450	6.8	+2.5
Turnout		35,998	94.6	
Two-party-preferred result
Labor	Terry Rumble	22,531	70.5	+0.7
Liberal	Sturt Guinness	9,431	29.5	−0.7
Labor hold		Swing	+0.7	

==== 1991 ====
1991 New South Wales state election: Illawarra
Party	Candidate	Votes	%	±%
Labor	Terry Rumble	20,347	61.3	+12.6
Liberal	Dennis Owen	7,878	23.7	−9.7
Democrats	Neil Smith	3,306	10.0	+10.0
Call to Australia	Brian Hughes	1,647	5.0	−0.3
Total formal votes		33,178	95.7	0.0
Informal votes		1,498	4.3	0.0
Turnout		34,676	94.9	
Two-party-preferred result
Labor	Terry Rumble	21,766	69.7	+11.6
Liberal	Dennis Owen	9,441	30.3	−11.6
Labor hold		Swing	+11.6	

=== Elections in the 1980s ===
==== 1988 ====
1988 New South Wales state election: Illawarra
Party	Candidate	Votes	%	±%
Labor	Terry Rumble	12,241	42.5	−21.4
Liberal	Dennis Owen	9,852	34.2	+6.0
Illawarra Workers	George Petersen	4,727	16.4	+16.4
Call to Australia	Violet Knowles	1,956	6.8	+6.8
Total formal votes		28,776	95.6	−1.8
Informal votes		1,340	4.4	+1.8
Turnout		30,116	95.2	
Two-party-preferred result
Labor	Terry Rumble	14,026	54.4	−13.6
Liberal	Dennis Owen	11,738	45.6	+13.6
Labor hold		Swing	−13.6	

==== 1984 ====
1984 New South Wales state election: Illawarra
Party	Candidate	Votes	%	±%
Labor	George Petersen	20,774	65.6	−3.5
Liberal	Dennis Owen	8,451	26.7	+11.0
Democrats	James Kay	2,444	7.7	0.0
Total formal votes		31,669	97.0	+2.0
Informal votes		989	3.0	−2.0
Turnout		32,658	93.6	+0.5
Two-party-preferred result
Labor	George Petersen		69.6	−10.0
Liberal	Dennis Owen		30.4	+10.0
Labor hold		Swing	−10.0	

==== 1981 ====
1981 New South Wales state election: Illawarra
Party	Candidate	Votes	%	±%
Labor	George Petersen	20,094	69.1	+0.6
Liberal	Mervyn Lucke	4,574	15.7	−2.0
Democrats	James Kay	2,234	7.7	−6.1
Independent	Susan Sallans	2,193	7.5	+7.5
Total formal votes		29,095	95.0	
Informal votes		1,544	5.0	
Turnout		30,639	93.1	
Two-party-preferred result
Labor	George Petersen	21,787	79.6	+1.4
Liberal	Mervyn Lucke	5,587	20.4	−1.4
Labor hold		Swing	+1.4	

=== Elections in the 1970s ===
==== 1978 ====
1978 New South Wales state election: Illawarra
Party	Candidate	Votes	%	±%
Labor	George Petersen	24,398	68.5	+2.7
Liberal	Malcolm Yates	6,302	17.7	+17.7
Democrats	William Speirs	4,924	13.8	+13.8
Total formal votes		35,624	97.5	−0.6
Informal votes		896	2.5	+0.6
Turnout		36,520	94.8	+0.8
Two-party-preferred result
Labor	George Petersen	27,845	78.2	+4.9
Liberal	Malcolm Yates	7,779	21.8	+21.8
Labor hold		Swing	+4.9	

==== 1976 ====
1976 New South Wales state election: Illawarra
Party	Candidate	Votes	%	±%
Labor	George Petersen	21,081	65.8	−6.9
Independent	Henry Schipp	9,145	28.5	+28.5
Workers	Margaret Wright	1,826	5.7	+5.7
Total formal votes		32,052	98.1	+2.8
Informal votes		608	1.9	−2.8
Turnout		32,660	94.0	+1.0
Two-candidate-preferred result
Labor	George Petersen	21,994	68.6	−4.1
Independent	Henry Schipp	10,058	31.4	+31.4
Labor hold		Swing	−4.1	

==== 1973 ====
1973 New South Wales state election: Illawarra
Party	Candidate	Votes	%	±%
Labor	George Petersen	19,523	72.7	+13.0
Democratic Labor	Everardus Himmelreich	7,318	27.3	+22.8
Total formal votes		26,841	95.3	
Informal votes		1,323	4.7	
Turnout		28,164	93.0	
Labor hold		Swing	+1.6	

==== 1971 ====
1971 New South Wales state election: Illawarra
Party	Candidate	Votes	%	±%
Labor	George Petersen	16,612	59.7	−2.1
Liberal	Lorna Shacklock	4,836	17.4	−10.7
Independent	Frank Arkell	3,361	12.1	+12.1
Independent	Raymond Clay	1,759	6.3	+6.3
Democratic Labor	Edward Himmelreich	1,237	4.4	+4.4
Total formal votes		27,805	96.8	
Informal votes		920	3.2	
Turnout		28,725	95.0	
Two-party-preferred result
Labor	George Petersen	19,763	71.1	+4.4
Liberal	Lorna Shacklock	8,042	28.9	−4.4
Labor notional hold		Swing	+4.4	

District recreated

==== 1968 - 1971 ====
District abolished

=== Elections in the 1960s ===
==== 1965 ====
1965 New South Wales state election: Illawarra
Party	Candidate	Votes	%	±%
Labor	Howard Fowles	12,523	52.7	−13.8
Liberal	John Poel	10,529	44.3	+18.4
Communist	Robert Webster	731	3.1	−4.4
Total formal votes		23,783	2.9	+0.6
Informal votes		711	2.9	−0.6
Turnout		24,494	95.1	+1.7
Two-party-preferred result
Labor	Howard Fowles	13,108	55.1	−17.5
Liberal	John Poel	10,675	44.9	+17.5
Labor hold		Swing	−17.5	

==== 1962 ====
1962 New South Wales state election: Illawarra
Party	Candidate	Votes	%	±%
Labor	Howard Fowles	13,442	66.5	−2.5
Liberal	John Weickhardt	5,239	25.9	+25.9
Communist	Milton Clunne	1,522	7.5	−2.3
Total formal votes		20,203	97.7	
Informal votes		464	2.3	
Turnout		20,667	93.4	
Two-party-preferred result
Labor	Howard Fowles	14,660	72.6	−1.3
Liberal	John Weickhardt	5,543	27.4	+27.4
Labor hold		Swing	N/A	

=== Elections in the 1950s ===
==== 1959 ====
1959 New South Wales state election: Illawarra
Party	Candidate	Votes	%	±%
Labor	Howard Fowles	14,503	69.0	
Independent	James Casey	4,463	21.2	
Communist	David Bowen	2,056	9.8	
Total formal votes		21,022	96.5	
Informal votes		765	3.5	
Turnout		21,787	93.1	
Two-candidate-preferred result
Labor	Howard Fowles	15,531	73.9	
Independent	James Casey	5,491	26.1	
Labor hold		Swing		

==== 1956 ====
1956 New South Wales state election: Illawarra
Party	Candidate	Votes	%	±%
Labor	Howard Fowles	10,809	59.9	−40.1
Liberal	Adrian O'Donnell	6,180	34.2	+34.2
Communist	David Bowen	1,070	5.9	+5.9
Total formal votes		18,059	98.4	
Informal votes		299	1.6	
Turnout		18,358	94.0	
Two-party-preferred result
Labor	Howard Fowles	11,772	65.2	−34.8
Liberal	Adrian O'Donnell	6,287	34.8	+34.8
Labor hold		Swing	N/A	

==== 1953 ====
1953 New South Wales state election: Illawarra
Party	Candidate	Votes	%	±%
Labor	Howard Fowles	unopposed		
Labor hold				

==== 1950 ====
1950 New South Wales state election: Illawarra
Party	Candidate	Votes	%	±%
Labor	Howard Fowles	9,196	60.1	
Liberal	Lindsay Maynes	6,095	39.9	
Total formal votes		15,291	98.5	
Informal votes		239	1.5	
Turnout		15,530	93.7	
Labor hold		Swing		

=== Elections in the 1940s ===
==== 1947 ====
1947 New South Wales state election: Illawarra
Party	Candidate	Votes	%	±%
Labor	Howard Fowles	8,918	59.7	−1.7
Liberal	Neville Carey	4,031	27.0	+9.2
Country	Arthur Butfield	1,994	13.3	−2.9
Total formal votes		14,943	98.6	+0.9
Informal votes		208	1.4	−0.9
Turnout		15,151	94.8	+3.3
Labor hold		Swing	N/A	

- Preferences were not distributed.

==== 1944 ====
1944 New South Wales state election: Illawarra
Party	Candidate	Votes	%	±%
Labor	Howard Fowles	8,090	61.4	+5.0
Democratic	John Hedge	2,346	17.8	−25.8
Country	Edward Spensley	2,132	16.2	+16.2
Independent Labor	Ronald Sarina	619	4.7	+4.7
Total formal votes		13,187	97.7	−0.4
Informal votes		307	2.3	+0.4
Turnout		13,494	91.5	−1.6
Labor hold		Swing	N/A	

- Preferences were not distributed.

==== 1941 ====
1941 New South Wales state election: Illawarra
Party	Candidate	Votes	%	±%
Labor	Howard Fowles	7,321	56.4	
United Australia	Clarence Faulkner	5,654	43.6	
Total formal votes		12,975	98.1	
Informal votes		249	1.9	
Turnout		13,224	93.1	
Labor hold		Swing		

=== Elections in the 1930s ===
==== 1938 ====
1938 New South Wales state election: Illawarra
Party	Candidate	Votes	%	±%
Labor	Billy Davies	unopposed		
Labor hold				

==== 1935 ====
1935 New South Wales state election: Illawarra
Party	Candidate	Votes	%	±%
Labor (NSW)	Billy Davies	8,086	51.4	+3.7
United Australia	Walter Duncan	6,659	42.3	−5.9
Communist	John Cranston	659	4.2	+1.8
Federal Labor	Albert Rowe	327	2.1	+0.7
Total formal votes		15,731	98.0	−0.2
Informal votes		322	2.0	+0.2
Turnout		16,053	97.6	+0.2
Labor (NSW) hold		Swing	N/A	

- Preferences were not distributed.

==== 1932 ====
1932 New South Wales state election: Illawarra
Party	Candidate	Votes	%	±%
United Australia	Patrick Canwell	7,133	48.2	+15.8
Labor (NSW)	Billy Davies	7,057	47.7	−18.2
Communist	William Blake	353	2.4	+0.7
Federal Labor	Mont Sheppard	201	1.4	+1.4
Independent	John Scarlett	61	0.4	+0.4
Total formal votes		14,805	98.2	−0.2
Informal votes		264	1.8	+0.2
Turnout		15,069	97.4	+1.2
Two-party-preferred result
Labor (NSW)	Billy Davies	7,426	50.2	
United Australia	Patrick Canwell	7,379	49.8	
Labor (NSW) hold		Swing	N/A	

==== 1930 ====
1930 New South Wales state election: Illawarra
Party	Candidate	Votes	%	±%
Labor	Billy Davies	8,944	65.9	
Nationalist	William Howarth	4,405	32.4	
Communist	Joseph Nixon	231	1.7	
Total formal votes		13,580	98.4	
Informal votes		219	1.6	
Turnout		13,799	96.2	
Labor hold		Swing		

The sitting member was Andrew Lysaght (Labor) who successfully contested Bulli. Billy Davies (Labor) was the sitting member for the abolished district of Wollongong.

=== Elections in the 1920s ===
==== 1927 ====
1927 New South Wales state election: Illawarra
Party	Candidate	Votes	%	±%
Labor	Andrew Lysaght Jr.	7,133	56.0	
Nationalist	Brian Doe (defeated)	5,610	44.0	
Total formal votes		12,743	98.2	
Informal votes		235	1.8	
Turnout		12,978	87.6	
Labor win		(new seat)		

District recreated

==== 1904 - 1927 ====
District abolished

=== Elections in the 1900s ===
==== 1904 by-election ====
1904 Illawarra by-election Saturday 9 January
Party	Candidate	Votes	%	±%
Liberal Reform	Edward Allen	716	42.5	−37.1
Progressive	Andrew Lysaght Sr.	563	33.5	
Labour	David Ritchie	404	24.0	
Total formal votes		1,683	100.0	+0.3
Informal votes		0	0.0	−0.3
Turnout		1,683	62.7	+20.1
Liberal Reform hold				

Archibald Campbell (Liberal Reform) died.

==== 1901 ====
1901 New South Wales state election: Illawarra
Party	Candidate	Votes	%	±%
Liberal Reform	Archibald Campbell	933	79.6	+14.3
Independent Labour	Henry Collings	239	20.4	
Total formal votes		1,172	99.7	+0.1
Informal votes		4	0.3	−0.1
Turnout		1,176	42.6	−17.8
Liberal Reform hold				

=== Elections in the 1890s ===
==== 1898 ====
1898 New South Wales colonial election: Illawarra
Party	Candidate	Votes	%	±%
Free Trade	Archibald Campbell	809	65.4	
National Federal	Thomas Kennedy	429	34.7	
Total formal votes		1,238	99.5	
Informal votes		6	0.5	
Turnout		1,244	60.4	
Free Trade hold				

==== 1895 ====
1895 New South Wales colonial election: Illawarra
Party	Candidate	Votes	%	±%
Free Trade	Archibald Campbell	875	63.0	
Protectionist	Francis Suttor	515	37.1	
Total formal votes		1,390	99.5	
Informal votes		7	0.5	
Turnout		1,397	73.8	
Free Trade hold				

==== 1894 ====
1894 New South Wales colonial election: Illawarra
Party	Candidate	Votes	%	±%
Free Trade	Archibald Campbell	972	59.8	
Protectionist	Andrew Lysaght Sr.	653	40.2	
Total formal votes		1,625	98.8	
Informal votes		19	1.2	
Turnout		1,644	85.5	
Free Trade win		(previously 2 members)		

Archibald Campbell (Free Trade) was one of two sitting members for Illawarra. The second member, John Nicholson (Labour) successfully contested the election for the new seat of Woronora.

==== 1891 by-election ====
1891 Illawarra by-election Saturday 3 October
Party	Candidate	Votes	%	±%
Labour	John Nicholson (elected 1)	1,432	37.3	
Free Trade	Archibald Campbell (elected 2)	1,055	27.5	
Protectionist	Andrew Lysaght Sr. defeated	1,009	26.3	
Free Trade	Joseph Mitchell	344	9.0	
Total formal votes		3,840	99.4	
Informal votes		24	0.6	
Turnout		3,864	59.4	
Labour hold 1				
Free Trade gain 1 from Protectionist				

The election of John Nicholson and Andrew Lysaght Sr. at the election for Illawarra in June was declared void.

==== 1891 ====
1891 New South Wales colonial election: Illawarra Wednesday 24 June
Party	Candidate	Votes	%	±%
Labour	John Nicholson (elected 1)	1,180	35.7	
Protectionist	Andrew Lysaght Sr. (elected 2)	799	24.2	
Free Trade	Archibald Campbell	669	20.2	
Free Trade	Thomas Bissell	463	14.0	
Free Trade	Frederick Franklin	195	5.9	
Total formal votes		3,306	99.5	
Informal votes		16	0.5	
Turnout		2,570	78.5	
Labour gain 1 from Free Trade				
Protectionist gain 1 from Free Trade				

=== Elections in the 1880s ===
==== 1889 ====
1889 New South Wales colonial election: Illawarra Saturday 9 February
Party	Candidate	Votes	%	±%
Free Trade	Francis Woodward (elected 1)	1,140	31.2	
Free Trade	Joseph Mitchell (elected 2)	973	26.6	
Protectionist	Andrew Lysaght Sr.	814	22.3	
Protectionist	Frederic Jones	420	11.5	
Protectionist	William Wiley	309	8.5	
Total formal votes		3,656	98.8	
Informal votes		44	1.2	
Turnout		1,871	59.0	
Free Trade hold 1 and win 1		(1 new seat)		

==== 1887 ====
1887 New South Wales colonial election: Illawarra Friday 18 February
Party	Candidate	Votes	%	±%
Free Trade	Francis Woodward (elected)	939	55.7	
Protectionist	Andrew Lysaght Sr. (defeated)	748	44.3	
Total formal votes		1,687	98.3	
Informal votes		29	1.7	
Turnout		1,716	59.7	

==== 1885 ====
1885 New South Wales colonial election: Illawarra Monday 19 October
Candidate	Votes	%
Andrew Lysaght Sr. (elected)	617	38.0
Francis Woodward	562	34.6
William Wiley	444	27.4
Total formal votes	1,623	98.1
Informal votes	32	1.9
Turnout	1,655	70.0

==== 1882 ====
1882 New South Wales colonial election: Illawarra Saturday 9 December
Candidate	Votes	%
Alexander Stuart (re-elected)	785	71.1
James Watson	319	28.9
Total formal votes	1,104	98.0
Informal votes	23	2.0
Turnout	1,128	65.9

James Watson had been unsuccessful in retaining his seat in Young.

==== 1880 ====
1880 New South Wales colonial election: Illawarra Wednesday 24 November
Candidate	Votes	%
Alexander Stuart (re-elected)	unopposed	

==== 1880 by-election ====
1880 Illawarra by-election Wednesday 7 July
Candidate	Votes	%
Alexander Stuart (elected)	686	60.3
Andrew Lysaght Sr.	437	38.4
Peter Orvad	14	1.2
Total formal votes	1,137	100.0
Informal votes	0	0.0
Turnout	1,137	70.9

Samuel Gray resigned.

=== Elections in the 1870s ===
==== 1877 ====
1877 New South Wales colonial election: Illawarra Monday 29 October
Candidate	Votes	%
Samuel Gray (re-elected)	unopposed	

==== 1874-75 ====
1874–75 New South Wales colonial election: Illawarra Monday 28 December 1874
Candidate	Votes	%
Samuel Gray (elected)	504	56.8
Andrew Lysaght	384	43.2
Total formal votes	888	100.0
Informal votes	0	0.0
Turnout	888	69.0

==== 1872 ====
1872 New South Wales colonial election: Illawarra Thursday 29 February
Candidate	Votes	%
William Forster (re-elected)	363	40.7
John Brown	328	36.8
Andrew Lysaght	201	22.5
Total formal votes	892	100.0
Informal votes	0	0.0
Turnout	892	65.3

=== Elections in the 1860s ===
==== 1869-70 ====
1869–70 New South Wales colonial election: Illawarra Tuesday 14 December 1869
Candidate	Votes	%
James Osborne (elected)	575	59.2
John Stewart (defeated)	396	40.8
Total formal votes	971	100.0
Informal votes	0	0.0
Turnout	971	68.6

==== 1866 by-election ====
1866 Illawarra by-election Monday 10 September
Candidate	Votes	%
John Stewart (elected)	460	56.7
Joseph Wilshire	352	43.3
Total formal votes	812	100.0
Informal votes	0	0.0
Turnout	812	63.1

Patrick Osborne resigned.

==== 1864-65 ====
1864–65 New South Wales colonial election: Illawarra Saturday 10 December 1864
Candidate	Votes	%
Patrick Osborne (elected)	561	56.7
John Stewart	428	43.3
Total formal votes	989	100.0
Informal votes	0	0.0
Turnout	989	79.4

==== 1860 ====
1860 New South Wales colonial election: Illawarra Wednesday 12 December
Candidate	Votes	%
Robert Haworth (elected)	476	53.1
John Stewart	420	46.9
Total formal votes	896	100.0
Informal votes	0	0.0
Turnout	896	55.7

=== Elections in the 1850s ===
==== 1859 by-election ====
1859 Illawarra by-election Monday 19 December
Candidate	Votes	%
Samuel Gordon (elected)	389	51.3
Robert Haworth	370	48.7
Total formal votes	759	100.0
Informal votes	0	0.0
Turnout	759	57.7

John Hargrave resigned to accept an appointment to the Legislative Council.

==== 1859 ====
1859 New South Wales colonial election: Illawarra Wednesday 15 June
Candidate	Votes	%
John Hargrave (re-elected)	629	61.4
Francis McCabe	396	38.6
Total formal votes	1,025	100.0
Informal votes	0	0.0
Turnout	1,025	77.9

John Hargrave was a member for East Camden.
