= Results of the 1901 New South Wales state election =

State election for New South Wales, Australia in July 1901

New South Wales state election, 3 July 1901 Legislative Assembly << 1898–1904 >>
Enrolled voters	345,500				
Votes cast	194,980		Turnout	62.84	+2.23
Informal votes	1,534		Informal	0.78	−0.14
Summary of votes by party
Party	Primary votes	%	Swing	Seats	Change
Liberal Reform	65,420	33.55	+0.66	37	−8
Progressive	44,817	22.99	−20.04	42	−10
Labour	35,952	18.44	+6.26	24	+5
Independent	21,595	11.08	+8.09	12	+8
Independent Liberal	16,770	8.60	+6.72	4	+3
Ind. Progressive	6,533	3.35	−3.68	2	−2
Independent Labor	3,565	1.83	+1.82	4	+4
Socialist Labor	328	0.17	+0.17	0	±0
Total	194,980			125	

The 1901 New South Wales state election was for 125 electoral districts, with each district returning one member. The election was conducted on the basis of a simple majority or first-past-the-post voting system. In this election, in 32 electorates the winning candidate received less than 50% of the votes, while 13 were uncontested. The average number of enrolled voters per electorate was 2,764, ranging from Wentworth (1,706) to Willoughby (4,854).

Of the 125 members of the house prior to the election, 18 had been elected to the new federal parliament, while 7 did not contest the election, (Note: For a comprehensive list, see Candidates of the 1901 New South Wales state election § Retiring members.) and a further 17 were defeated at the election. (Note: The defeated members were Henry Chapman (Sydney-Fitzroy); Thomas Clarke (Darlington); David Davis (Shoalhaven); William Ferris (Parramatta); Robert Fitzgerald (Robertson); John Garland (Woollahra); Sir James Graham (Sydney-Belmore); Samuel Lees (Nepean); Edmund Molesworth (Newtown-Erskine); William Morgan (Hawkesbury); William Rigg (Newtown-St Peters); Hugh Ross (Quirindi); Wilfred Spruson (Sydney-Gipps); Thomas Taylor (Canterbury); Edward Terry (Ryde); Charles Wilson (Armidale); James Young (Manning).) 81 members (65%) retained a seat after the election.

== Election results ==
=== Albury ===
1901 New South Wales state election: Albury
Party	Candidate	Votes	%	±%
Independent	Thomas Griffith	901	50.5	−0.7
Liberal Reform	Richard Ball	882	49.5	+0.7
Total formal votes		1,783	98.5	+0.3
Informal votes		27	1.5	−0.3
Turnout		1,810	75.4	+6.5
Member changed to Independent from Progressive				

=== Alma ===
1901 New South Wales state election: Alma
Party	Candidate	Votes	%	±%
Independent Labour	William Williams	874	52.0	
Labour	Jabez Wright	783	46.6	−42.0
Independent	William Colliss	25	1.5	+1.5
Total formal votes		1,682	100	+2.8
Informal votes		0	0	−2.8
Turnout		1,682	64.2	+18.8
Independent Labour gain from Labour				

The sitting member was Josiah Thomas (Labour) who did not contest the election as he had been elected in March 1901 to the federal seat of Barrier which included Broken Hill. William Williams nominated as an Independent Labor candidate after friction between local branches and the Barrier District Assembly.

=== Annandale ===
1901 New South Wales state election: Annandale
Party	Candidate	Votes	%	±%
Liberal Reform	William Mahony	1,186	52.1	−0.5
Progressive	Isaiah Cohen	1,076	47.3	0.2
Independent	Richard Kimber	14	0.6	
Total formal votes		2,276	99.5	−0.2
Informal votes		14	0.5	+0.2
Turnout		2,290	61.2	−1.3
Liberal Reform hold				

=== Argyle ===
1901 New South Wales state election: Argyle
Party	Candidate	Votes	%	±%
Progressive	Thomas Rose	1,059	67.3	+12.2
Liberal Reform	Francis Isaac	514	32.7	−12.2
Total formal votes		1,573	99.4	−0.1
Informal votes		9	0.6	+0.1
Turnout		1,582	59.7	−4.6
Progressive hold				

=== Armidale ===
1901 New South Wales state election: Armidale
Party	Candidate	Votes	%	±%
Liberal Reform	Edmund Lonsdale	935	50.8	+7.1
Progressive	Charles Wilson	907	49.2	−7.1
Total formal votes		1,842	98.8	−0.6
Informal votes		22	1.2	+0.6
Turnout		1,864	70.4	−8.4
Liberal Reform gain from Progressive				

=== Ashburnham ===
1901 New South Wales state election: Ashburnham
Party	Candidate	Votes	%	±%
Progressive	Joseph Reymond	1,081	56.0	−2.2
Liberal Reform	Thomas Bavister	605	31.4	−10.4
Independent	Frank Calder	243	12.6	
Total formal votes		1,929	99.4	+0.3
Informal votes		12	0.6	−0.3
Turnout		1,941	68.3	+0.6
Progressive hold				

=== Ashfield ===
1901 New South Wales state election: Ashfield
Party	Candidate	Votes	%	±%
Liberal Reform	Frederick Winchcombe	unopposed		
Liberal Reform gain from Progressive				

Bernhard Wise (Protectionist) had won the seat at the 1898 election, however he was appointed to the Legislative Council and Frederick Winchcombe (Liberal Reform) won the seat at the November 1900 by-election.

=== Ballina ===
1901 New South Wales state election: Ballina
Party	Candidate	Votes	%	±%
Progressive	John Perry	805	58.6	+0.9
Liberal Reform	Thomas Temperley	305	22.2	−20.1
Independent	Thomas Russell	233	17.0	
Independent	Samuel Dutton	30	2.2	
Total formal votes		1,373	99.4	−0.3
Informal votes		8	0.6	+0.3
Turnout		1,381	66.0	+6.1
Progressive hold				

=== Balmain North ===
1901 New South Wales state election: Balmain North
Party	Candidate	Votes	%	±%
Labour	John Storey	922	42.4	
Liberal Reform	Gilbert Murdoch	505	23.2	−28.4
Progressive	Alexander Milne	411	18.9	+0.2
Independent Liberal	William Ward	277	12.7	
Total formal votes		2,177	99.5	−
Informal votes		12	0.6	−
Turnout		2,189	65.8	+3.7
Labour gain from Liberal Reform				

The sitting member was Bill Wilks (Liberal Reform) who did not contest the election as he had been elected in March 1901 to the federal seat of Dalley which included Balmain.

=== Balmain South ===
1901 New South Wales state election: Balmain South
Party	Candidate	Votes	%	±%
Labour	Sydney Law	1,413	50.7	+3.7
Independent Liberal	John Gray	871	31.2	
Liberal Reform	Charles Donnelley	389	14.0	
Ind. Progressive	Percy Tighe	80	2.9	
Independent	William Pacey	30	1.1	
Independent	Robert Morris	5	0.2	
Total formal votes		2,788	99.0	−0.5
Informal votes		27	1.0	+0.5
Turnout		2,815	69.0	+4.1
Labour hold				

=== The Barwon ===
1901 New South Wales state election: The Barwon
Party	Candidate	Votes	%	±%
Progressive	William Willis	817	65.9	+8.0
Labour	William Wright	422	34.1	−8.0
Total formal votes		1,239	99.0	+0.3
Informal votes		13	1.0	−0.3
Turnout		1,252	56.3	+0.9
Progressive hold				

=== Bathurst ===
1901 New South Wales state election: Bathurst
Party	Candidate	Votes	%	±%
Progressive	William Young	958	51.6	−1.1
Liberal Reform	George Machattie	890	47.9	+0.6
Independent	Jacob Innes	9	0.5	
Total formal votes		1,857	98.1	−1.3
Informal votes		37	2.0	1.3
Turnout		1,894	72.9	−0.4
Progressive hold				

=== Bega ===
1901 New South Wales state election: Bega
Party	Candidate	Votes	%	±%
Progressive	Henry Clarke	925	54.8	−2.4
Independent	William Boot	717	42.5	+0.3
Independent	William Braine	45	2.7	+2.1
Total formal votes		1,687	99.1	+0.5
Informal votes		16	0.9	−0.5
Turnout		1,703	73.8	+11.9
Progressive hold				

=== Bingara ===
1901 New South Wales state election: Bingara
Party	Candidate	Votes	%	±%
Liberal Reform	Samuel Moore	unopposed		
Liberal Reform hold				

=== Boorowa ===
1901 New South Wales state election: Boorowa
Party	Candidate	Votes	%	±%
Labour	Niels Nielsen	1,128	76.2	+38.4
Ind. Progressive	Herbert O'Leary	352	23.8	
Total formal votes		1,480	98.9	+0.2
Informal votes		17	1.1	−0.2
Turnout		1,497	65.7	+4.7
Labour gain from Progressive				

Kenneth Mackay (Progressive) had been elected in 1898, however, he was appointed to the Legislative Council and Niels Nielsen (Labour) won the seat at the by-election.

=== Botany ===
1901 New South Wales state election: Botany
Party	Candidate	Votes	%	±%
Labour	John Dacey	1,236	54.6	+23.1
Liberal Reform	William Stephen	1,027	45.4	
Total formal votes		2,263	99.0	−
Informal votes		23	1.0	−
Turnout		2,286	73.3	+5.8
Labour hold				

=== Bourke ===
1901 New South Wales state election: Bourke
Party	Candidate	Votes	%	±%
Progressive	William Davis	unopposed		
Progressive hold				

=== Bowral ===
1901 New South Wales state election: Bowral
Party	Candidate	Votes	%	±%
Liberal Reform	William McCourt	unopposed		
Liberal Reform hold				

=== Braidwood ===
1901 New South Wales state election: Braidwood
Party	Candidate	Votes	%	±%
Progressive	Albert Chapman	640	43.2	−29.9
Independent Liberal	Richard Higgins	483	32.6	
Independent Liberal	Patrick O'Brien	223	15.0	
Independent Liberal	Frederick Gordon	70	4.7	
Independent Liberal	Ebenezer Henry	46	3.1	
Independent Liberal	Alexander Fraser	15	1.0	
Independent	Walter Horberry	3	0.2	
Independent	Bartholomew O'Sullivan	2	0.1	
Ind. Progressive	John Kenny	1	0.07	
Total formal votes		1,483	95.6	−3.5
Informal votes		69	4.5	+3.5
Turnout		1,552	71.1	+18.7
Progressive hold				

=== Broken Hill ===
1901 New South Wales state election: Broken Hill
Party	Candidate	Votes	%	±%
Labour	John Cann	1,281	93.5	+7.4
Independent Liberal	Charles Counsell	89	6.5	
Total formal votes		1,370	98.8	+2.8
Informal votes		17	1.2	−2.8
Turnout		1,387	40.4	−5.3
Labour hold				

=== Burwood ===
1901 New South Wales state election: Burwood
Party	Candidate	Votes	%	±%
Independent	William Archer	1,084	64.6	+15.9
Liberal Reform	Alexander Ralston	594	35.4	
Total formal votes		1,678	99.4	−
Informal votes		10	0.6	−
Turnout		1,688	65.3	+2.8
Independent hold				

=== Camden ===
1901 New South Wales state election: Camden
Party	Candidate	Votes	%	±%
Progressive	John Kidd	1,037	63.9	+6.3
Liberal Reform	William Blackmore	585	36.1	
Total formal votes		1,622	99.5	−0.2
Informal votes		9	0.6	+0.2
Turnout		1,631	60.9	−7.6
Progressive hold				

=== Canterbury ===
1901 New South Wales state election: Canterbury
Party	Candidate	Votes	%	±%
Liberal Reform	Thomas Mackenzie	1,048	47.9	−17.9
Independent	Thomas Taylor (defeated)	991	45.3	
Independent	Frederick Barker	56	2.6	
Independent	William Gilliver	53	2.4	
Independent	Hampton Slatyer	18	0.8	
Independent	Thomas Dalton	17	0.8	
Independent	Frederick Webster	3	0.14	
Total formal votes		2,186	98.5	−0.5
Informal votes		34	1.5	+0.5
Turnout		2,220	62.0	+7.6
Liberal Reform hold				

Varney Parkes (Free Trade) had won the seat at the 1898 election, however he resigned and Thomas Taylor (Independent) won the seat at the July 1900 by-election.

=== The Clarence ===
1901 New South Wales state election: The Clarence
Party	Candidate	Votes	%	±%
Progressive	John McFarlane	unopposed		
Progressive hold				

=== Cobar ===
1901 New South Wales state election: Cobar
Party	Candidate	Votes	%	±%
Labour	Donald Macdonell	unopposed		
Labour hold				

=== Condoublin ===
1901 New South Wales state election: Condoublin
Party	Candidate	Votes	%	±%
Labour	Patrick Clara	575	36.1	−18.4
Independent	Andrew Stewart	560	35.1	
Independent Liberal	David Tasker	268	16.8	
Independent	William Nash	96	6.0	
Independent	William Wilkinson	95	6.0	
Total formal votes		1,594	99.3	−
Informal votes		11	0.7	−
Turnout		1,605	57.9	+3.3
Labour hold				

The election was overturned by the Elections and Qualifications Committee due to irregularities in the poll and Patrick Clara retained the seat for Labour at the subsequent by-election.

=== Coonamble ===
1901 New South Wales state election: Coonamble
Party	Candidate	Votes	%	±%
Labour	Hugh Macdonald	895	61.6	
Ind. Progressive	John Reddan	557	38.4	
Total formal votes		1,452	99.9	+0.6
Informal votes		2	0.1	−0.6
Turnout		1,454	48.2	−7.0
Labour hold				

=== Cowra ===
1901 New South Wales state election: Cowra
Party	Candidate	Votes	%	±%
Progressive	Thomas Waddell	unopposed		
Progressive hold				

=== Darlington ===
1901 New South Wales state election: Darlington
Party	Candidate	Votes	%	±%
Labour	Phillip Sullivan	1,194	51.9	
Liberal Reform	Thomas Clarke	1,074	46.7	1.3
Socialist Labor	John Neill	33	1.4	
Total formal votes		2,301	99.3	−0.1
Informal votes		17	0.7	+0.1
Turnout		2,318	64.5	+3.6
Labour gain from Liberal Reform				

=== Deniliquin ===
1901 New South Wales state election: Deniliquin
Party	Candidate	Votes	%	±%
Ind. Progressive	Joseph Evans	452	29.3	
Independent Liberal	John Lewis	331	21.4	
Ind. Progressive	Richard Eames	293	19.0	
Ind. Progressive	Patrick Fagan	219	14.2	
Independent	Hugh McKinney	148	9.6	
Ind. Progressive	Allen Lakeman	101	6.5	
Total formal votes		1,544	98.8	−0.4
Informal votes		19	1.2	+0.4
Turnout		1,563	56.1	+2.2
Ind. Progressive gain from Progressive				

The sitting member was John Chanter (Progressive) who did not contest the election as he had been elected in March 1901 to the federal seat of Riverina which included Deniliquin.

=== Dubbo ===
1901 New South Wales state election: Dubbo
Party	Candidate	Votes	%	±%
Liberal Reform	Simeon Phillips	1,094	58.0	+1.3
Progressive	Edwin Utley	492	26.1	−17.2
Labour	Linus Bungate	301	16.0	
Total formal votes		1,887	99.5	+0.4
Informal votes		9	0.5	−0.4
Turnout		1,896	61.6	−4.5
Liberal Reform hold				

=== Durham ===
1901 New South Wales state election: Durham
Party	Candidate	Votes	%	±%
Progressive	Walter Bennett	unopposed		
Member changed to Progressive from Ind. Progressive				

=== East Maitland ===
1901 New South Wales state election: East Maitland
Party	Candidate	Votes	%	±%
Liberal Reform	James Brunker	990	67.6	+15.6
Ind. Progressive	William McIlroy	475	32.4	
Total formal votes		1,465	99.7	+0.7
Informal votes		4	0.3	−0.7
Turnout		1,469	69.9	−0.2
Liberal Reform hold				

=== Eden-Bombala ===
1901 New South Wales state election: Eden-Bombala
Party	Candidate	Votes	%	±%
Independent	William Wood	868	60.9	+4.0
Independent Liberal	Bernard McTernan	558	39.1	
Total formal votes		1,426	99.4	+1.4
Informal votes		8	0.6	−1.4
Turnout		1,434	62.8	−4.8
Member changed to Independent from Progressive				

=== Glebe ===
1901 New South Wales state election: Glebe
Party	Candidate	Votes	%	±%
Liberal Reform	James Hogue	936	42.0	−15.9
Independent	William Tate	421	18.9	
Independent	Lewis Abrams	358	16.1	
Labour	Peter Strong	289	13.0	
Independent	Stanley Cole	223	10.0	
Total formal votes		2,227	95.6	−3.7
Informal votes		102	4.4	+3.7
Turnout		2,329	63.8	+2.8
Liberal Reform hold				

=== Glen Innes ===
1901 New South Wales state election: Glen Innes
Party	Candidate	Votes	%	±%
Progressive	Francis Wright	584	40.1	−9.3
Independent Liberal	Follet Thomas	452	31.0	
Independent	Thomas Chandler	421	28.9	−14.4
Total formal votes		1,457	98.8	−0.5
Informal votes		18	1.2	+0.5
Turnout		1,475	65.5	+10.3
Progressive hold				

=== Gloucester ===
1901 New South Wales state election: Gloucester
Party	Candidate	Votes	%	±%
Independent	Richard Price	981	79.4	+15.5
Liberal Reform	Alfred Lee	255	20.6	−15.5
Total formal votes		1,236	99.8	+0.2
Informal votes		3	0.2	−0.2
Turnout		1,239	48.3	−12.4
Member changed to Independent from Progressive				

=== Goulburn ===
1901 New South Wales state election: Goulburn
Party	Candidate	Votes	%	±%
Liberal Reform	James Ashton	947	63.1	+0.8
Labour	James Toomey	554	36.9	
Total formal votes		1,501	99.5	−0.2
Informal votes		8	0.5	+0.2
Turnout		1,509	59.6	−2.7
Liberal Reform hold				

=== Grafton ===
1901 New South Wales state election: Grafton
Party	Candidate	Votes	%	±%
Progressive	John See	843	94.2	+31.7
Independent Liberal	Frederick Wilcox	52	5.8	
Total formal votes		895	99.0	−0.5
Informal votes		9	1.0	+0.5
Turnout		904	37.9	−28.2
Progressive hold				

=== Granville ===
1901 New South Wales state election: Granville
Party	Candidate	Votes	%	±%
Liberal Reform	John Nobbs	1,299	72.3	+9.4
Progressive	William Windsor	497	27.7	+6.6
Total formal votes		1,796	99.4	−0.1
Informal votes		11	0.6	+0.1
Turnout		1,807	65.4	−0.5
Liberal Reform hold				

=== Grenfell ===
1901 New South Wales state election: Grenfell
Party	Candidate	Votes	%	±%
Labour	William Holman	1,299	51.7	−3.9
Liberal Reform	Arthur Grimm	1,213	48.3	
Total formal votes		2,512	100.0	+0.4
Informal votes		0	0.0	−0.4
Turnout		2,512	68.9	11.3
Labour hold				

=== Gundagai ===
1901 New South Wales state election: Gundagai
Party	Candidate	Votes	%	±%
Progressive	John Barnes	785	39.4	−0.3
Independent	Walter Griffin	709	35.6	
Liberal Reform	John Miller	449	22.5	
Independent Liberal	James Cook	49	2.5	
Total formal votes		1,992	98.9	+0.8
Informal votes		22	1.1	−0.8
Turnout		2,014	69.5	4.0
Progressive hold				

=== Gunnedah ===
1901 New South Wales state election: Gunnedah
Party	Candidate	Votes	%	±%
Labour	David Hall	1,008		+61.2
Liberal Reform	Thomas Wills-Allen	639	38.8	+13.5
Total formal votes		1,647	99.3	+0.6
Informal votes		11	0.7	−0.6
Turnout		1,658	60.4	11.4
Labour gain from Progressive				

The sitting member Thomas Goodwin (Progressive) did not contest the election.

=== Hartley ===
1901 New South Wales state election: Hartley
Party	Candidate	Votes	%	±%
Independent	John Hurley	518	32.9	
Labour	Robert Pillans	502	31.9	
Liberal Reform	Harry Goyder	472	30.0	−40.4
Independent	John Tabrett	41	2.6	
Progressive	Henry Brierley	40	2.5	−27.1
Total formal votes		1,573	99.6	+0.9
Informal votes		7	0.4	−0.9
Turnout		1,580	67.8	15.4
Independent gain from Liberal Reform				

The sitting member was Joseph Cook (Liberal Reform) who did not contest the election as he had been elected in March 1901 to the federal seat of Parramatta.

=== The Hastings and The Macleay ===
1901 New South Wales state election: The Hastings and The Macleay
Party	Candidate	Votes	%	±%
Liberal Reform	Robert Davidson	578	28.9	
Progressive	Percival Basche	420	21.0	
Independent	Edward Noonan	403	20.2	
Independent	Otho Dangar	376	18.8	
Independent	Hugh Bridson	220	11.0	
Total formal votes		1,997	99.3	
Informal votes		14	0.7	
Turnout		2,011	74.6	
Liberal Reform gain from Progressive				

The sitting member was Francis Clarke (Progressive) who did not contest the election as he had been elected in March 1901 to the federal seat of Cowper.

=== The Hawkesbury ===
1901 New South Wales state election: The Hawkesbury
Party	Candidate	Votes	%	±%
Progressive	Brinsley Hall	1,348	63.3	+17.8
Liberal Reform	William Morgan	781	36.7	−12.1
Total formal votes		2,129	99.2	+0.3
Informal votes		18	0.8	−0.3
Turnout		2,147	80.2	+7.3
Progressive gain from Liberal Reform				

=== Hay ===
1901 New South Wales state election: Hay
Party	Candidate	Votes	%	±%
Independent	Frank Byrne	unopposed		
Member changed to Independent from Liberal Reform				

=== The Hume ===
1901 New South Wales state election: The Hume
Party	Candidate	Votes	%	±%
Progressive	Gordon McLaurin	unopposed		
Progressive hold				

Sir William Lyne (Progressive) resigned prior to the federal election in March 1901 at which he successfully contested the seat of Hume. Having resigned earlier than other candidates, a by-election was held in April 1901 in which Gordon McLaurin retained the seat for the Progressive Party.

=== Illawarra ===
1901 New South Wales state election: Illawarra
Party	Candidate	Votes	%	±%
Liberal Reform	Archibald Campbell	933	79.6	+14.3
Independent Labour	Henry Collings	239	20.4	
Total formal votes		1,172	99.7	+0.1
Informal votes		4	0.3	−0.1
Turnout		1,176	42.6	−17.8
Liberal Reform hold				

=== Inverell ===
1901 New South Wales state election: Inverell
Party	Candidate	Votes	%	±%
Progressive	William McIntyre	750	55.6	−37.1
Ind. Progressive	James McIlveen	599	44.4	
Total formal votes		1,349	100.0	+1.3
Informal votes		0	0.0	−1.3
Turnout		1,349	54.5	+20.93
Progressive hold				

The sitting member was George Cruickshank (Progressive) who did not contest the election as he had been elected in March 1901 to the federal seat of Gwydir.

=== Kahibah ===
1901 New South Wales state election: Kahibah
Party	Candidate	Votes	%	±%
Labour	Alfred Edden	1,218	89.5	+24.5
Independent Liberal	John Bailey	143	10.5	
Total formal votes		1,361	100.0	+0.3
Informal votes		0	0.0	−0.3
Turnout		1,369	54.1	−5.1
Labour hold				

=== Kiama ===
1901 New South Wales state election: Kiama
Party	Candidate	Votes	%	±%
Progressive	Alexander Campbell	710	54.4	+2.9
Liberal Reform	John Waugh	595	45.6	−2.9
Total formal votes		1,305	100.0	+0.2
Informal votes		0	0.0	−0.2
Turnout		1,305	66.6	−2.2
Progressive hold				

=== The Lachlan ===
1901 New South Wales state election: The Lachlan
Party	Candidate	Votes	%	±%
Progressive	James Carroll	unopposed		
Progressive hold				

=== Leichhardt ===
1901 New South Wales state election: Leichhardt
Party	Candidate	Votes	%	±%
Liberal Reform	John Hawthorne	1,475	67.4	+18.6
Labour	William Niland	715	32.7	+8.4
Total formal votes		2,190	99.5	−0.3
Informal votes		12	0.5	+0.3
Turnout		2,202	58.4	−5.6
Liberal Reform hold				

=== Lismore ===
1901 New South Wales state election: Lismore
Party	Candidate	Votes	%	±%
Independent Liberal	John Coleman	824	48.0	
Independent Liberal	James O'Flynn	506	29.5	
Independent Liberal	Richard Balmer	277	16.1	
Independent Liberal	James Frith	62	3.6	
Independent Liberal	Frank Russell	25	1.5	
Labour	Robert Campbell	12	0.7	
Progressive	Charles Duffy	12	0.7	
Total formal votes		1,718	98.2	−1.5
Informal votes		32	1.8	+1.5
Turnout		1,750	68.0	+23.7
Independent Liberal gain from Progressive				

The sitting member was Thomas Ewing (Progressive) who did not contest the election as he had been elected in March 1901 to the federal seat of Richmond.

=== Macquarie ===
1901 New South Wales state election: Macquarie
Party	Candidate	Votes	%	±%
Progressive	William Hurley	849	58.8	+2.7
Liberal Reform	John Miller	594	41.2	+4.8
Total formal votes		1,443	98.5	+0.6
Informal votes		22	1.5	−0.6
Turnout		1,465	59.1	+2.8
Progressive hold				

=== The Manning ===
1901 New South Wales state election: The Manning
Party	Candidate	Votes	%	±%
Progressive	John Thomson	911	50.5	+9.1
Liberal Reform	James Young	893	49.5	−9.1
Total formal votes		1,804	99.7	+0.2
Informal votes		6	0.3	−0.2
Turnout		1,810	76.9	+2.3
Progressive gain from Liberal Reform				

=== Marrickville ===
1901 New South Wales state election: Marrickville
Party	Candidate	Votes	%	±%
Liberal Reform	Richard McCoy	1,214	44.2	−11.4
Independent Liberal	David Chenhall	806	29.3	−5.6
Independent Liberal	William Moyes	341	12.4	+12.4
Independent Liberal	George Leslie	125	4.6	+4.6
Independent Liberal	George Morehouse	125	4.6	+4.6
Progressive	James Edwards	109	4.0	
Independent	John Hardy	28	1.02	
Total formal votes		2,748	99.5	−0.2
Informal votes		14	0.5	+0.2
Turnout		2,762	66.2	+1.6
Liberal Reform hold				

The sitting member was Francis McLean (Liberal Reform) who did not contest the election as he had been elected in March 1901 to the federal seat of Lang which included Marrickville.

=== Molong ===
1901 New South Wales state election: Molong
Party	Candidate	Votes	%	±%
Progressive	Andrew Ross	671	55.2	+10.6
Liberal Reform	John Withington	544	44.8	+13.6
Total formal votes		1,215	99.1	−0.1
Informal votes		11	0.9	+0.1
Turnout		1,226	56.6	−4.9
Progressive hold				

=== Manaro ===
1901 New South Wales state election: Manaro
Party	Candidate	Votes	%	±%
Labour	Gus Miller	967	67.5	+4.9
Liberal Reform	John Sellar	466	32.5	
Total formal votes		1,433	99.2	+1.9
Informal votes		11	0.8	−1.9
Turnout		1,444	62.5	+11.9
Member changed to Labour from Progressive				

=== Moree ===
1901 New South Wales state election: Moree
Party	Candidate	Votes	%	±%
Labour	William Webster	877	52.6	
Progressive	John Crane	789	47.4	−22.1
Total formal votes		1,666	100.0	+0.6
Informal votes		0	0.0	−0.6
Turnout		1,666	58.0	+8.3
Labour gain from Progressive				

The sitting member was Thomas Hassall (Progressive) who did not contest the election.

=== Moruya ===
1901 New South Wales state election: Moruya
Party	Candidate	Votes	%	±%
Liberal Reform	William Millard	956	65.6	+12.5
Independent	Joynton Smith	440	30.2	
Progressive	Theophilus Cox	62	4.3	−42.1
Total formal votes		1,458	99.6	+0.5
Informal votes		6	0.4	−0.5
Turnout		1,464	70.6	−2.2
Liberal Reform hold				

=== Mudgee ===
1901 New South Wales state election: Mudgee
Party	Candidate	Votes	%	±%
Progressive	Edwin Richards	1,318	54.4	+4.3
Liberal Reform	Robert Jones	1,104	45.6	−4.3
Total formal votes		2,422	99.4	+0.3
Informal votes		15	0.6	−0.3
Turnout		2,437	74.0	+5.9
Progressive hold				

=== The Murray ===
1901 New South Wales state election: The Murray
Party	Candidate	Votes	%	±%
Progressive	James Hayes	885	59.3	
Independent Liberal	Alexander McArthur	607	40.7	
Total formal votes		1,492	98.2	
Informal votes		27	1.8	
Turnout		1,519	49.2	
Progressive hold				

=== The Murrumbidgee ===
1901 New South Wales state election: The Murrumbidgee
Party	Candidate	Votes	%	±%
Progressive	Thomas Fitzpatrick	1,111	66.6	−2.8
Labour	Percy Waxman	558	33.4	+2.8
Total formal votes		1,669	99.3	+0.2
Informal votes		12	0.7	−0.2
Turnout		1,681	57.7	−3.1
Progressive hold				

=== Narrabri ===
1901 New South Wales state election: Narrabri
Party	Candidate	Votes	%	±%
Liberal Reform	Albert Collins	738	51.2	
Labour	John Gately	520	36.1	−4.6
Ind. Progressive	Job Sheldon	184	12.8	
Total formal votes		1,442	99.7	+1.4
Informal votes		5	0.4	−1.4
Turnout		1,447	60.2	+1.6
Liberal Reform gain from Labour				

The sitting member was Hugh Ross (Labour) who unsuccessfully contested Quirindi.

=== The Nepean ===
1901 New South Wales state election: The Nepean
Party	Candidate	Votes	%	±%
Progressive	Thomas Smith	930	53.8	+11.5
Liberal Reform	Samuel Lees	799	46.2	−1.8
Total formal votes		1,729	100.0	+1.2
Informal votes		0	0.0	−1.2
Turnout		1,729	72.5	+3.7
Progressive gain from Liberal Reform				

=== Newcastle East ===
1901 New South Wales state election: Newcastle East
Party	Candidate	Votes	%	±%
Liberal Reform	William Dick	1,037	66.9	+6.7
Labour	James Curley	514	33.1	
Total formal votes		1,551	99.6	+1.3
Informal votes		7	0.5	−1.3
Turnout		1,558	69.0	+3.7
Liberal Reform hold				

=== Newcastle West ===
1901 New South Wales state election: Newcastle West
Party	Candidate	Votes	%	±%
Liberal Reform	Owen Gilbert	802	57.9	
Progressive	Emmanuel Flynn	316	22.8	−23.6
Labour	Thomas Green	267	19.3	−34.3
Total formal votes		1,385	99.4	−0.5
Informal votes		9	0.7	+0.5
Turnout		1,394	70.8	+7.5
Liberal Reform gain from Labour				

The sitting member was James Thomson (Labour) who did not contest the election.

=== Newtown-Camperdown ===
1901 New South Wales state election: Newtown-Camperdown
Party	Candidate	Votes	%	±%
Ind. Progressive	James Smith	759	35.1	+10.2
Liberal Reform	Thomas Probert	562	26.0	−1.3
Independent Liberal	William Clegg	382	17.7	
Labour	Samuel Heaton	270	12.5	+7.2
Independent Liberal	Richard Bellemey	165	7.6	
Socialist Labor	Andrew Thomson	24	1.1	
Total formal votes		2,162	99.0	+0.5
Informal votes		22	1.0	−0.5
Turnout		2,184	62.6	+0.8
Ind. Progressive gain from Liberal Reform				

The sitting member was Francis Cotton (Liberal Reform) who did not contest the election.

=== Newtown-Erskine ===
1901 New South Wales state election: Newtown-Erskine
Party	Candidate	Votes	%	±%
Labour	Robert Hollis	921	49.7	
Liberal Reform	Edmund Molesworth	886	47.8	−13.5
Independent Liberal	Leopold Bertram	46	2.5	+2.5
Total formal votes		1,853	99.3	−0.5
Informal votes		14	0.8	+0.5
Turnout		1,867	61.0	+1.3
Labour gain from Liberal Reform				

=== Newtown-St Peters ===
1901 New South Wales state election: Newtown-St Peters
Party	Candidate	Votes	%	±%
Independent Liberal	James Fallick	790	35.0	
Labour	George Clark	770	34.2	
Liberal Reform	William Rigg	662	29.4	−31.9
Independent	David Hayes	16	0.7	
Ind. Progressive	James Mitchell	13	0.6	+0.2
Independent	Walter Arnold	4	0.2	
Total formal votes		2,255	99.1	+0.2
Informal votes		20	0.9	−0.2
Turnout		2,275	62.7	−0.5
Independent Liberal gain from Liberal Reform				

=== Northumberland ===
1901 New South Wales state election: Northumberland
Party	Candidate	Votes	%	±%
Independent	John Norton	unopposed		
Independent gain from Protectionist				

Richard Stevenson (Protectionist) died in 1899 and John Norton (Independent) won the seat in a by-election.

=== Orange ===
1901 New South Wales state election: Orange
Party	Candidate	Votes	%	±%
Liberal Reform	Harry Newman	1,012	45.6	−8.3
Independent Liberal	Albert Gardiner	613	27.6	
Progressive	Patrick Flanagan	595	26.8	−19.3
Total formal votes		2,220	99.5	+0.3
Informal votes		12	0.5	−0.3
Turnout		2,232	68.0	−2.2
Liberal Reform hold				

=== Paddington ===
1901 New South Wales state election: Paddington
Party	Candidate	Votes	%	±%
Liberal Reform	Charles Oakes	878	38.0	−15.0
Progressive	Thomas West	766	33.2	−13.0
Independent	Robert Usher	459	19.9	
Independent	Thomas Meagher	111	4.8	
Independent	Frederick Harper	97	4.2	
Total formal votes		2,311	99.5	+1.0
Informal votes		11	0.5	−1.0
Turnout		2,322	60.0	−1.5
Liberal Reform hold				

The sitting member was John Neild (Liberal Reform) who did not contest the election as he had been elected in March 1901 as a Senator for NSW.

=== Parramatta ===
1901 New South Wales state election: Parramatta
Party	Candidate	Votes	%	±%
Liberal Reform	Tom Moxham	1,234	57.02	
Progressive	William Ferris	930	42.98	
Total formal votes		2,164	99.54	
Informal votes		10	0.46	
Turnout		2,174	80.28	
Liberal Reform gain from Progressive				

=== Petersham ===
1901 New South Wales state election: Petersham
Party	Candidate	Votes	%	±%
Liberal Reform	John Cohen	1,436	58.6	+21.7
Independent Liberal	Joseph Cockbaine	950	38.8	
Independent	William Richardson	64	2.6	
Total formal votes		2,450	99.3	−0.6
Informal votes		18	0.7	+0.6
Turnout		2,468	65.6	−2.8
Member changed to Liberal Reform from Progressive				

=== Queanbeyan ===
1901 New South Wales state election: Queanbeyan
Party	Candidate	Votes	%	±%
Progressive	Edward O'Sullivan	866	69.0	+15.0
Liberal Reform	Charles Turner	376	29.9	−13.8
Independent Liberal	Patrick McNamara	14	1.1	
Total formal votes		1,256	98.4	−0.6
Informal votes		21	1.6	+0.6
Turnout		1,277	65.1	−4.8
Progressive hold				

=== Quirindi ===
1901 New South Wales state election: Quirindi
Party	Candidate	Votes	%	±%
Progressive	Robert Levien	808	58.5	+4.7
Liberal Reform	John Rodgers	380	27.5	
Labour	Hugh Ross	194	14.0	−30.3
Total formal votes		1,382	99.2	−0.1
Informal votes		11	0.8	+0.1
Turnout		1,393	59.8	−3.0
Member changed to Progressive from Independent				

=== Raleigh ===
1901 New South Wales state election: Raleigh
Party	Candidate	Votes	%	±%
Progressive	George Briner	827	51.1	+12.8
Independent	Henry Boltwood	470	29.0	
Independent	Richard Cooke	154	9.5	
Ind. Progressive	Eugene Rudder	101	6.2	
Independent	Jeremiah Mannix	67	4.1	
Total formal votes		1,619	99.0	−0.3
Informal votes		16	1.0	+0.3
Turnout		1,635	68.6	+5.7
Progressive gain from Independent				

The sitting member John McLaughlin (Independent) did not contest the election.

=== Randwick ===
1901 New South Wales state election: Randwick
Party	Candidate	Votes	%	±%
Liberal Reform	David Storey	1,367	72.4	+21.4
Progressive	James O'Donnell	508	26.9	−22.1
Independent	Thomas Armfield	13	0.7	
Total formal votes		1,888	98.3	−1.4
Informal votes		33	1.7	+1.4
Turnout		1,921	53.3	−7.6
Liberal Reform hold				

=== Redfern ===
1901 New South Wales state election: Redfern
Party	Candidate	Votes	%	±%
Labour	James McGowen	1,560	68.9	+13.8
Liberal Reform	Peter McNaught	608	26.9	+26.9
Independent	Joseph Butterfield	96	4.2	+3.5
Total formal votes		2,264	99.5	+0.3
Informal votes		11	0.5	−0.3
Turnout		2,275	61.1	+4.4
Labour hold				

=== The Richmond ===
1901 New South Wales state election: The Richmond
Party	Candidate	Votes	%	±%
Progressive	Robert Pyers	854	73.2	−6.0
Liberal Reform	Thomas McFadden	222	19.0	
Independent Liberal	John Harper	91	7.8	
Total formal votes		1,167	99.2	+0.3
Informal votes		10	0.9	−0.3
Turnout		1,177	53.0	+3.7
Progressive hold				

=== Robertson ===
1901 New South Wales state election: Robertson
Party	Candidate	Votes	%	±%
Liberal Reform	William Fleming	1,017	50.7	+12.3
Progressive	Robert Fitzgerald (defeated)	991	49.4	−12.3
Total formal votes		2,008	98.8	+0.4
Informal votes		24	1.2	−0.4
Turnout		2,032	68.3	+6.6
Liberal Reform gain from Progressive				

=== Ryde ===
1901 New South Wales state election: Ryde
Party	Candidate	Votes	%	±%
Independent Liberal	Frank Farnell	1,039	44.6	+1.5
Liberal Reform	Thomas Henley	684	29.3	
Independent	Edward Terry	604	25.9	−24.4
Ind. Progressive	Henry Tucker	4	0.2	
Total formal votes		1,167	99.2	−0.3
Informal votes		10	0.9	+0.3
Turnout		1,177	53.0	−16.1
Independent Liberal gain from Ind. Progressive				

=== Rylstone ===
1901 New South Wales state election: Rylstone
Party	Candidate	Votes	%	±%
Liberal Reform	John Fitzpatrick	932	62.5	+8.3
Progressive	Thomas Arkins	559	37.5	−8.3
Total formal votes		1,491	100.0	+0.7
Informal votes		0	0.0	−0.7
Turnout		1,491	60.1	−4.9
Liberal Reform hold				

=== St George ===
1901 New South Wales state election: St George
Party	Candidate	Votes	%	±%
Liberal Reform	Joseph Carruthers	1,519	69.2	−2.6
Labour	William Flinn	676	30.8	
Total formal votes		2,195	100.0	+0.8
Informal votes		0	0.0	−0.8
Turnout		2,195	53.2	−11.6
Liberal Reform hold				

=== St Leonards ===
1901 New South Wales state election: St Leonards
Party	Candidate	Votes	%	±%
Liberal Reform	Edward Clark	1,066	53.7	−11.9
Independent Liberal	Thomas Creswell	801	40.3	
Labour	Peter O'Connell	119	6.0	
Total formal votes		1,986	99.5	+0.4
Informal votes		11	0.6	−0.4
Turnout		1,997	59.3	+1.8
Liberal Reform hold				

=== Sherbrooke ===
1901 New South Wales state election: Sherbrooke
Party	Candidate	Votes	%	±%
Independent	Broughton O'Conor	823	56.4	+6.9
Liberal Reform	John Roughley	505	34.6	−13.2
Independent Liberal	Adam Pringle	132	9.0	
Total formal votes		1,460	99.2	−0.1
Informal votes		12	0.8	+0.1
Turnout		1,472	66.0	+4.4
Member changed to Independent from Progressive				

=== The Shoalhaven ===
1901 New South Wales state election: The Shoalhaven
Party	Candidate	Votes	%	±%
Liberal Reform	Mark Morton	927	55.5	
Progressive	David Davis	742	44.5	−11.5
Total formal votes		1,669	99.2	−0.1
Informal votes		14	0.8	+0.1
Turnout		1,683	83.7	+22.0
Liberal Reform gain from Ind. Progressive				

=== Singleton ===
1901 New South Wales state election: Singleton
Party	Candidate	Votes	%	±%
Progressive	Charles Dight	972	57.1	+1.0
Liberal Reform	Augustus Walker	585	34.4	−9.5
Independent	Thomas Blick	144	8.5	
Total formal votes		1,701	99.8	+0.3
Informal votes		4	0.2	−0.3
Turnout		1,705	68.2	+4.2
Progressive hold				

=== Sturt ===
1901 New South Wales state election: Sturt
Party	Candidate	Votes	%	±%
Independent Labor	William Ferguson	716	64.6	
Labour	Charles Maley	392	35.4	
Total formal votes		1,108	98.7	−0.3
Informal votes		15	1.3	+0.3
Turnout		1,123	53.9	+16.9
Member changed to Independent Labour from Labour				

William Ferguson had been elected in 1898 as a Labour representative, however he was denied endorsement due to his independent behaviour in the Assembly.

=== Sydney-Belmore ===
1901 New South Wales state election: Sydney-Belmore
Party	Candidate	Votes	%	±%
Progressive	Eden George	715	49.6	+15.9
Liberal Reform	James Graham	672	46.6	−3.1
Labour	William Gocher	47	3.3	
Independent	John Donovan	8	0.6	
Total formal votes		1,442	98.8	−0.6
Informal votes		17	1.2	+0.6
Turnout		1,459	54.1	+2.1
Progressive gain from Liberal Reform				

=== Sydney-Bligh ===
1901 New South Wales state election: Sydney-Bligh
Party	Candidate	Votes	%	±%
Progressive	Patrick Quinn	781	49.7	−4.9
Liberal Reform	John Brindley	604	38.4	−5.6
Independent	John Hughes	85	5.4	
Labour	Daniel Healey	76	4.8	
Independent Liberal	John Campbell	27	1.7	
Total formal votes		1,573	99.8	+1.0
Informal votes		3	0.2	−1.0
Turnout		1,576	56.4	+2.9
Progressive hold				

=== Sydney-Cook ===
1901 New South Wales state election: Sydney-Cook
Party	Candidate	Votes	%	±%
Liberal Reform	Samuel Whiddon	665	41.2	−11.0
Progressive	George Perry	623	38.6	−7.5
Independent	John Griffin	170	10.5	
Labour	Philip Mulholland	135	8.4	
Ind. Progressive	William Hart	17	1.1	
Independent	Henry Cato	4	0.3	
Total formal votes		1,614	99.3	−0.1
Informal votes		11	0.7	+0.1
Turnout		1,625	64.4	+7.3
Liberal Reform hold				

=== Sydney-Denison ===
1901 New South Wales state election: Sydney-Denison
Party	Candidate	Votes	%	±%
Labour	Andrew Kelly	804	53.9	
Liberal Reform	George Harris	570	38.2	−22.2
Independent Liberal	William Watts	83	5.6	
Independent	James Hynes	35	2.4	
Total formal votes		1,492	98.7	−0.1
Informal votes		20	1.3	+0.1
Turnout		1,512	61.4	+8.8
Labour gain from Liberal Reform				

The sitting member Sir Matthew Harris (Liberal Reform) did not contest the election.

=== Sydney-Fitzroy ===
1901 New South Wales state election: Sydney-Fitzroy
Party	Candidate	Votes	%	±%
Liberal Reform	Daniel Levy	605	35.9	
Independent Liberal	Arthur McElhone	381	22.6	
Independent	Henry Chapman	379	22.5	
Labour	Donald McKinnon	121	7.2	
Ind. Progressive	Harry Foran	108	6.4	
Independent	Denis O'Sullivan	71	4.2	
Independent	Callaghan Garvan	20	1.2	
Total formal votes		1,685	99.1	+0.1
Informal votes		15	0.9	−0.1
Turnout		1,700	56.5	−2.7
Liberal Reform hold				

At the 1898 election Henry Chapman was elected as a Liberal Reform representative, while Daniel Levy had stood as an independent.

=== Sydney-Flinders ===
1901 New South Wales state election: Sydney-Flinders
Party	Candidate	Votes	%	±%
Progressive	Arthur Nelson	601	34.9	−13.2
Liberal Reform	John Waine	598	34.8	−3.2
Ind. Progressive	Ernest Gardner	191	11.1	+2.1
Independent Liberal	Hezekiah Evers	124	7.2	
Ind. Progressive	James Lawrence	124	7.2	
Labour	Frederick Sommerhoff	82	4.8	-0.0
Total formal votes		1,720	99.2	+0.2
Informal votes		14	0.8	−0.2
Turnout		1,734	75.8	+23.4
Progressive hold				

=== Sydney-Gipps ===
1901 New South Wales state election: Sydney-Gipps
Party	Candidate	Votes	%	±%
Labour	William Daley	981	53.5	+4.5
Ind. Progressive	Wilfred Spruson	655	35.7	−14.6
Liberal Reform	Elliot Johnson	197	10.8	
Total formal votes		1,833	98.9	−0.4
Informal votes		21	1.1	+0.4
Turnout		1,854	64.4	+4.8
Labour gain from Progressive				

=== Sydney-King ===
1901 New South Wales state election: Sydney-King
Party	Candidate	Votes	%	±%
Progressive	Ernest Broughton	550	37.6	−8.3
Liberal Reform	Thomas Hughes	532	36.3	−17.3
Independent	Alexander Wilson	150	10.3	
Independent	Ernest Thompson	128	8.7	
Independent Liberal	Fred Walsh	91	6.2	
Independent	David Fealy	9	0.6	
Independent Liberal	Vincent Taylor	4	0.3	
Total formal votes		1,464	99.0	−0.3
Informal votes		15	1.0	+0.3
Turnout		1,479	53.0	−1.1
Progressive gain from Liberal Reform				

The sitting member was George Reid (Liberal Reform) who did not contest the election as he had been elected in March 1901 to the federal seat of East Sydney.

=== Sydney-Lang ===
1901 New South Wales state election: Sydney-Lang
Party	Candidate	Votes	%	±%
Labour	John Power	576	43.8	−9.8
Liberal Reform	Evan Jones	447	34.0	
Progressive	Joseph Chuck	259	19.7	−9.6
Socialist Labor	Harry Holland	34	2.6	
Total formal votes		1,316	98.8	−0.0
Informal votes		16	1.2	+0.0
Turnout		1,332	56.0	+8.5
Labour hold				

The sitting member was Billy Hughes (Labour) who did not contest the election as he had been elected in March 1901 to the federal seat of West Sydney.

=== Sydney-Phillip ===
1901 New South Wales state election: Sydney-Phillip
Party	Candidate	Votes	%	±%
Progressive	Daniel O'Connor	676	41.4	−16.1
Liberal Reform	John Moloney	514	31.5	−2.8
Labour	George Barnett	442	27.1	
Total formal votes		1,632	99.6	+0.3
Informal votes		6	0.4	−0.3
Turnout		1,638	54.1	+2.9
Progressive hold				

=== Sydney-Pyrmont ===
1901 New South Wales state election: Sydney-Pyrmont
Party	Candidate	Votes	%	±%
Labour	Samuel Smith	1,008	92.3	+39.5
Independent Liberal	John Sergeant	84	7.7	
Total formal votes		1,092	98.8	−0.3
Informal votes		13	1.2	+0.3
Turnout		1,105	46.9	−11.8
Labour hold				

=== Tamworth ===
1901 New South Wales state election: Tamworth
Party	Candidate	Votes	%	±%
Independent	Raymond Walsh	687	44.7	
Liberal Reform	Albert Piddington	646	42.0	−6.8
Progressive	Geoffrey Codrington	204	13.3	−38.0
Total formal votes		1,537	99.4	+0.7
Informal votes		9	0.6	−0.7
Turnout		1,546	68.1	+2.8
Independent gain from Progressive				

The sitting member was William Sawers (Progressive) who did not contest the election as he had been elected in March 1901 to the federal seat of New England.

=== Tenterfield ===
1901 New South Wales state election: Tenterfield
Party	Candidate	Votes	%	±%
Liberal Reform	Charles Lee	unopposed		
Liberal Reform hold				

=== Tumut ===
1901 New South Wales state election: Tumut
Party	Candidate	Votes	%	±%
Progressive	Robert Donaldson	1,127	57.3	+23.6
Labour	James Elphick	740	37.6	+5.6
Liberal Reform	Charles Royle	100	5.1	
Total formal votes		1,967	99.4	+2.5
Informal votes		11	0.6	−2.5
Turnout		1,978	73.8	+1.4
Member changed to Progressive from Independent				

=== The Tweed ===
1901 New South Wales state election: The Tweed
Party	Candidate	Votes	%	±%
Independent	Richard Meagher	802	66.3	+2.7
Liberal Reform	Alexander Eastaughffe	408	33.7	
Total formal votes		1,210	98.9	−0.1
Informal votes		14	1.1	+0.1
Turnout		1,224	64.4	+16.0
Independent hold				

=== Uralla-Walcha ===
1901 New South Wales state election: Uralla-Walcha
Party	Candidate	Votes	%	±%
Progressive	Michael MacMahon	572	46.6	−8.8
Liberal Reform	Charles Marsh	549	44.7	+39.9
Independent	James Watts	103	8.4	
Independent	Frank Townshend	3	0.2	
Total formal votes		1,227	98.6	+0.4
Informal votes		17	1.4	−0.4
Turnout		1,244	68.1	+10.3
Progressive hold				

=== Wagga Wagga ===
1901 New South Wales state election: Wagga Wagga
Party	Candidate	Votes	%	±%
Progressive	James Gormly	1,128	70.1	−0.5
Ind. Progressive	George Coleman	482	29.9	
Total formal votes		1,610	99.5	+0.2
Informal votes		8	0.5	−0.2
Turnout		1,618	65.0	+12.5
Progressive hold				

=== Wallsend ===
1901 New South Wales state election: Wallsend
Party	Candidate	Votes	%	±%
Labour	John Estell	1,560	89.4	+28.1
Socialist Labor	James Moroney	185	10.6	
Total formal votes		1,745	99.3	−0.1
Informal votes		12	0.7	+0.1
Turnout		1,757	59.2	−13.3
Labour hold				

=== Waratah ===
1901 New South Wales state election: Waratah
Party	Candidate	Votes	%	±%
Labour	Arthur Griffith	1,099	58.9	+8.6
Ind. Progressive	William Sharp	766	41.1	
Total formal votes		1,865	99.3	−0.1
Informal votes		13	0.7	+0.1
Turnout		1,878	72.0	+3.3
Labour hold				

=== Warringah ===
1901 New South Wales state election: Warringah
Party	Candidate	Votes	%	±%
Independent	Ellison Quirk	739	34.7	
Independent Liberal	James Alderson	604	28.4	
Liberal Reform	James Conroy	490	23.0	−22.0
Independent Liberal	Thomas Loxton	296	13.9	
Total formal votes		2,129	100.0	+0.5
Informal votes		0	0.0	−0.5
Turnout		2,129	62.6	−3.3
Independent gain from Progressive				

The sitting member was Dugald Thomson (Progressive), (Note: Dugald Thomson had been elected as member of the Progressive party in 1898, then known as the National Federal party, described as a free trade federationist.) who did not contest the election as he had been elected in March 1901 as a Free Trade member for the federal seat of North Sydney.

=== Waterloo ===
1901 New South Wales state election: Waterloo
Party	Candidate	Votes	%	±%
Liberal Reform	George Anderson	1,125	50.9	+0.8
Labour	Ernest Banner	1,026	46.5	+25.9
Socialist Labor	James Morrish	52	2.4	
Independent	Henry Maynard	6	0.3	−0.3
Total formal votes		2,209	99.5	+0.3
Informal votes		11	0.5	−0.3
Turnout		2,220	65.2	+2.4
Liberal Reform hold				

=== Waverley ===
1901 New South Wales state election: Waverley
Party	Candidate	Votes	%	±%
Liberal Reform	Thomas Jessep	1,035	48.9	−7.4
Independent	James Macarthur-Onslow	886	41.8	−1.8
Independent Liberal	Alfred Allen	171	8.1	
Independent	John Carroll	18	0.9	+0.3
Independent	David Penfold	8	0.4	
Total formal votes		2,118	99.1	−0.0
Informal votes		19	0.9	+0.1
Turnout		2,137	61.9	−1.1
Liberal Reform hold				

=== Wellington ===
1901 New South Wales state election: Wellington
Party	Candidate	Votes	%	±%
Liberal Reform	John Haynes	1,239	54.1	−2.9
Progressive	John McEwen	1,053	45.9	+2.9
Total formal votes		2,292	100.0	+1.5
Informal votes		0	0.0	−1.5
Turnout		2,292	61.1	−0.8
Liberal Reform hold				

=== Wentworth ===
1901 New South Wales state election: Wentworth
Party	Candidate	Votes	%	±%
Labour	Robert Scobie	649	63.3	+32.3
Independent	Harry Harben	258	25.2	
Independent	Thomas Boynton	85	8.3	
Independent Liberal	Alexander Cameron	34	3.3	
Total formal votes		1,026	99.1	+0.3
Informal votes		9	0.9	−0.3
Turnout		1,035	60.7	+17.0
Labour gain from Progressive				

The sitting member was Sir Joseph Abbott (Protectionist) who did not contest the election.

=== West Macquarie ===
1901 New South Wales state election: West Macquarie
Party	Candidate	Votes	%	±%
Progressive	Paddy Crick	1,152	59.2	+3.6
Liberal Reform	Otto Jaeger	795	40.8	−2.3
Total formal votes		1,947	99.0	+0.8
Informal votes		19	1.0	−0.8
Turnout		1,966	52.6	−4.7
Progressive hold				

=== West Maitland ===
1901 New South Wales state election: West Maitland
Party	Candidate	Votes	%	±%
Independent	John Gillies	903	78.8	+14.0
Independent	Richard Proctor	243	21.2	
Total formal votes		1,146	99.7	+0.4
Informal votes		4	0.4	−0.4
Turnout		1,150	45.5	−25.1
Member changed to Independent from Liberal Reform				

=== Wickham ===
1901 New South Wales state election: Wickham
Party	Candidate	Votes	%	±%
Progressive	John Fegan	1,005	53.7	+5.9
Labour	George Errington	677	36.2	+14.5
Liberal Reform	William Sheddon	190	10.2	
Total formal votes		1,872	99.6	+0.1
Informal votes		8	0.4	−0.1
Turnout		1,880	77.4	+4.6
Member changed to Progressive from Liberal Reform				

=== Wilcannia ===
1901 New South Wales state election: Wilcannia
Party	Candidate	Votes	%	±%
Independent Labor	Richard Sleath	637	47.9	−24.1
Labour	John Buzacott	414	31.1	
Independent Liberal	Thomas Bell	280	21.0	
Total formal votes		1,331	99.3	−0.3
Informal votes		10	0.8	+0.3
Turnout		1,341	52.5	+9.9
Member changed to Independent Labour from Labour				

=== Willoughby ===
1901 New South Wales state election: Willoughby
Party	Candidate	Votes	%	±%
Liberal Reform	George Howarth	1,671	57.9	+10.1
Independent Liberal	Claude Leplastrier	902	31.2	
Labour	George Waite	314	10.9	
Total formal votes		2,887	99.5	−0.2
Informal votes		16	0.6	+0.2
Turnout		2,903	59.8	−4.8
Liberal Reform hold				

=== Woollahra ===
1901 New South Wales state election: Woollahra
Party	Candidate	Votes	%	±%
Independent Liberal	William Latimer	1,041	56.3	+37.1
Liberal Reform	John Garland	809	43.7	−2.9
Total formal votes		1,850	100.0	+0.3
Informal votes		0	0.0	−0.3
Turnout		1,850	61.0	+0.9
Independent Liberal gain from Liberal Reform				

=== Woronora ===
1901 New South Wales state election: Woronora
Party	Candidate	Votes	%	±%
Independent Labor	John Nicholson (Note: 1898 was the only election at which John Nicholson was listed as anything other than Independent Labour and Antony Green suggests he may have been better classified as Independent Labour for 1898.)	1,099	56.4	−10.3
Liberal Reform	Thomas Bissell	834	42.8	
Labour	John Wonders	16	0.8	
Total formal votes		1,949	98.6	−0.8
Informal votes		27	1.4	+0.8
Turnout		1,976	71.2	+7.0
Member changed to Independent Labour from Liberal Reform				

=== Yass ===
1901 New South Wales state election: Yass
Party	Candidate	Votes	%	±%
Liberal Reform	William Affleck	875	52.3	+5.8
Progressive	Bernard Grogan	799	47.7	+4.3
Total formal votes		1,674	100.0	+1.2
Informal votes		0	0.0	−1.2
Turnout		1,674	75.5	+12.1
Liberal Reform hold				

=== Young ===
1901 New South Wales state election: Young
Party	Candidate	Votes	%	±%
Labour	George Burgess	833	39.4	−19.3
Independent	Alphonso Tewksbury	614	29.1	
Independent	Thomas Spring	348	16.5	
Independent	John Lynch	269	12.7	
Liberal Reform	James Rankin	49	2.3	
Total formal votes		2,113	100.0	+0.8
Informal votes		0	0.0	−0.8
Turnout		2,113	70.1	−2.3
Labour hold				

The sitting member was Chris Watson (Labour) who did not contest the election as he had been elected in March 1901 to the federal seat of Bland.

== See also ==
- Candidates of the 1901 New South Wales state election
- Members of the New South Wales Legislative Assembly, 1901–1904
