= Candidates of the 1901 New South Wales state election =

There were 373 candidates contesting 125 seats at the 1901 New South Wales state election which was held on 3 July 1901.

Since the previous election in 1898, the Protectionist Party (or National Federal Party) had become the Progressive Party, while the Free Trade Party had become the Liberal Reform Party.

== Retiring members ==
=== Progressive ===
- Joseph Abbott MLA (Wentworth)
- John Chanter MLA (Deniliquin) — elected to the federal House of Representatives
- Austin Chapman MLA (Braidwood) — elected to the federal House of Representatives
- Francis Clarke MLA (Hastings and Macleay) — elected to the federal House of Representatives
- George Cruickshank MLA (Inverell) — elected to the federal House of Representatives
- Thomas Ewing MLA (Lismore) — elected to the federal House of Representatives
- Thomas Goodwin MLA (Gunnedah)
- Thomas Hassall MLA (Moree)
- William Sawers MLA (Tamworth) — elected to the federal House of Representatives
- Dugald Thomson MLA (Warringah) — elected to the federal House of Representatives. (Note: Dugald Thomson had been elected as member of the Progressive party in 1898, then known as the National Federal party, described as a free trade federationist.)

=== Liberal ===
- Joseph Cook MLA (Hartley) — elected to the federal House of Representatives
- Francis Cotton MLA (Newtown-Camperdown)
- Sir Matthew Harris MLA (Sydney-Denison)
- Francis McLean MLA (Marrickville) — elected to the federal House of Representatives
- John Neild MLA (Paddington) — elected to the federal Senate
- George Reid MLA (Sydney-King) — elected to the federal House of Representatives
- Bill Wilks MLA (Balmain North) — elected to the federal House of Representatives

=== Labor ===
- Thomas Brown MLA (Condoublin) — elected to the federal House of Representatives
- Billy Hughes MLA (Sydney-King) — elected to the federal House of Representatives
- William Spence MLA (Cobar) — elected to the federal House of Representatives
- Josiah Thomas MLA (Alma) — elected to the federal House of Representatives
- James Thomson MLA (Newcastle West)
- David Watkins MLA (Wallsend) — elected to the federal House of Representatives
- Chris Watson MLA (Young) — elected to the federal House of Representatives

=== Independent ===
- John McLaughlin MLA (Raleigh)

== Legislative Assembly ==
Sitting members are shown in bold text. Successful candidates are highlighted in the relevant colour.

Electorate	Held by	Progressive candidate	Liberal candidate	Labour candidate	Other candidates
Albury	Progressive		Richard Ball		**Thomas Griffith** (Ind)
Alma	Labour			Jabez Wright	William Colliss (Ind)
Alma	Labour			Jabez Wright	William Williams (Ind Lab)
Annandale	Liberal	Reginald Cohen	**William Mahony**		Richard Kimber (Ind)
Argyle	Progressive	**Thomas Rose**	Francis Isaac		
Armidale	Progressive	**Charles Wilson**	Edmund Lonsdale		
Ashburnham	Progressive	**Joseph Reymond**	Thomas Bavister		Frank Calder (Ind)
Ashfield	Liberal		**Frederick Winchcombe**		
Ballina	Progressive	**John Perry**	Thomas Temperley		Samuel Dutton (Ind); Thomas Russell (Ind)
Balmain North	Liberal	Alexander Milne	Gilbert Murdoch	John Storey	Walter Macdougall (Ind); William Ward (Ind Lib)
Balmain South	Labour		Charles Donnelley	**Sydney Law**	John Gray (Ind Lib); Robert Morris (Ind); William Pacey (Ind); Percy Tighe (Ind Prog)
Barwon	Progressive	**William Willis**		William Wright	
Bathurst	Progressive	**William Young**	George Machattie		Jacob Innes (Ind)
Bega	Progressive	**Henry Clarke**			William Boot (Ind); William Braine (Ind)
Bingara	Liberal		**Samuel Moore**		
Boorowa	Labour			**Niels Nielsen**	Herbert O'Leary (Ind Prog)
Botany	Labour		William Stephen	**John Dacey**	
Bourke	Progressive	**William Davis**			
Bowral	Liberal		**William McCourt**		
Braidwood	Progressive	Albert Chapman			Alexander Fraser (Ind Lib); Frederick Gordon (Ind Lib); Richard Higgins (Ind Lib); Walter Horberry (Ind); Ebenezer Henry (Ind Lib); John Kenny (Ind Prog); Patrick O'Brien (Ind Lib); Bartholomew O'Sullivan (Ind)
Broken Hill	Labour			**John Cann**	Charles Counsell (Ind Lib)
Burwood	Independent		Alexander Ralston		**William Archer** (Ind)
Camden	Progressive	**John Kidd**	William Blackmore		
Canterbury	Independent		Thomas Mackenzie		Frederick Barker (Ind); Thomas Dalton (Ind); William Gilliver (Ind); Hampton Slatyer (Ind); **Thomas Taylor** (Ind); Frederick Webster (Ind)
Clarence	Progressive	**John McFarlane**			
Cobar	Labour			Donald Macdonell	
Condoublin	Labour			Patrick Clara	William Nash (Ind); Andrew Stewart (Ind); David Tasker (Ind Lib); William Wilkinson (Ind)
Coonamble	Labour			**Hugh Macdonald**	John Reddan (Ind Prog)
Cowra	Progressive	**Thomas Waddell**			
Darlington	Liberal		**Thomas Clarke**	Phillip Sullivan	John Neill (Soc)
Deniliquin	Progressive				Richard Eames (Ind Prog)
Deniliquin	Progressive				Joseph Evans (Ind Prog)
Deniliquin	Progressive				Patrick Fagan (Ind Prog); Allen Lakeman (Ind Prog); John Lewis (Ind Lib); Hugh McKinney (Ind)
Dubbo	Liberal	Edwin Utley	**Simeon Phillips**	Linus Bungate	
Durham	Progressive	**Walter Bennett**			
East Maitland	Liberal		**James Brunker**		William McIlroy (Ind Prog)
Eden-Bombala	Progressive				Bernard McTernan (Ind Lib)
Eden-Bombala	Progressive				**William Wood** (Ind)
Glebe	Liberal		**James Hogue**	Peter Strong	Lewis Abrams (Ind); Stanley Cole (Ind); William Tate (Ind)
Glen Innes	Progressive	**Francis Wright**			Thomas Chandler (Ind); Follett Thomas (Ind Lib)
Gloucester	Progressive		Alfred Lee		**Richard Price** (Ind)
Goulburn	Liberal		**James Ashton**	James Toomey	
Grafton	Progressive	**John See**			Frederick Wilcox (Ind Lib)
Granville	Liberal	William Windsor	**John Nobbs**		
Grenfell	Labour		Arthur Grimm	**William Holman**	
Gundagai	Progressive	**John Barnes**	John Miller		James Cook (Ind Lib); Walter Griffin (Ind)
Gunnedah	Progressive		Thomas Wills-Allen	David Hall	
Hartley	Liberal	Henry Brierley	Harry Goyder	Robert Pillans	John Hurley (Ind)
Hartley	Liberal	Henry Brierley	Harry Goyder	Robert Pillans	John Tabrett (Ind)
Hastings and Macleay	Progressive	Percival Basche	Robert Davidson		Hugh Bridson (Ind); Otho Dangar (Ind); Edward Noonan (Ind)
Hawkesbury	Liberal	Brinsley Hall	**William Morgan**		
Hay	Liberal				**Frank Byrne** (Ind)
Hume	Progressive	**Gordon McLaurin**			
Illawarra	Liberal		**Archibald Campbell**		Henry Collings (Ind Lab)
Inverell	Progressive	William McIntyre			James McIlveen (Ind Prog)
Kahibah	Labour			**Alfred Edden**	John Bailey (Ind Lib)
Kiama	Progressive	**Alexander Campbell**	John Waugh		
Lachlan	Progressive	**James Carroll**			
Leichhardt	Liberal		**John Hawthorne**	William Niland	
Lismore	Progressive	Charles Duffy		Robert Campbell	Richard Balmer (Ind Lib)
Lismore	Progressive	Charles Duffy		Robert Campbell	John Coleman (Ind Lib)
Lismore	Progressive	Charles Duffy		Robert Campbell	James Frith (Ind Lib); James O'Flynn (Ind Lib); Frank Russell (Ind Lib)
Macquarie	Progressive	**William Hurley**	John Miller		
Manning	Liberal	John Thomson	**James Young**		
Marrickville	Liberal	James Edwards	Richard McCoy		David Chenhall (Ind Lib); John Hardy (Ind); George Leslie (Ind Lib); George Morehouse (Ind Lib); William Moyes (Ind Lib)
Molong	Progressive	**Andrew Ross**	John Withington		
Monaro	Progressive		John Sellar	**Gus Miller**	
Moree	Progressive	John Crane		William Webster	
Moruya	Liberal	Theophilus Cox	**William Millard**		James Smith (Ind)
Mudgee	Progressive	**Edwin Richards**	Robert Jones		
Murray	Progressive	**James Hayes**			Alexander McArthur (Ind Lib)
Murrumbidgee	Progressive	**Thomas Fitzpatrick**		Percy Waxman	
Narrabri	Labour		Albert Collins	John Gately	Job Sheldon (Ind Prog)
Nepean	Liberal	Thomas Smith	**Samuel Lees**		
Newcastle East	Liberal		**William Dick**	James Curley	
Newcastle West	Labour	Emmanuel Flynn	Owen Gilbert	Thomas Green	
Newtown-Camperdown	Liberal		Thomas Probert	Samuel Heaton	Richard Bellemey (Ind Lib); William Clegg (Ind Lib)
Newtown-Camperdown	Liberal		Thomas Probert	Samuel Heaton	James Smith (Ind Prog)
Newtown-Camperdown	Liberal		Thomas Probert	Samuel Heaton	Andrew Thomson (Soc)
Newtown-Erskine	Liberal		**Edmund Molesworth**	Robert Hollis	Leopold Bertram (Ind Lib)
Newtown-St Peters	Liberal		**William Rigg**	George Clark	Walter Arnold (Ind)
Newtown-St Peters	Liberal		**William Rigg**	George Clark	James Fallick (Ind Lib)
Newtown-St Peters	Liberal		**William Rigg**	George Clark	David Hayes (Ind); James Mitchell (Ind Prog)
Northumberland	Independent				**John Norton** (Ind)
Orange	Liberal	Patrick Flanagan	**Harry Newman**		Albert Gardiner (Ind Lib)
Paddington	Liberal	Thomas West	Charles Oakes		Frederick Harper (Ind); Thomas Meagher (Ind); Robert Usher (Ind)
Parramatta	Progressive	**William Ferris**	Tom Moxham		
Petersham	Progressive		**John Cohen**		Joseph Cockbaine (Ind Lib); William Richardson (Ind)
Queanbeyan	Progressive	**Edward O'Sullivan**	Charles Turner		Patrick McNamara (Ind Lib)
Quirindi	Independent	**Robert Levien**	John Rodgers	**Hugh Ross**	
Raleigh	Independent	George Briner			Henry Boltwood (Ind); Richard Cooke (Ind); Jeremiah Mannix (Ind); Eugene Rudder (Ind Prog)
Randwick	Liberal	James O'Donnell	**David Storey**		Thomas Armfield (Ind)
Redfern	Labour		Peter McNaught	**James McGowen**	Joseph Butterfield (Ind)
Richmond	Progressive	**Robert Pyers**	Thomas McFadden		John Harper (Ind Lib)
Robertson	Progressive	**Robert Fitzgerald**	William Fleming		
Ryde	Independent		Thomas Henley		Frank Farnell (Ind Lib)
Ryde	Independent		Thomas Henley		**Edward Terry** (Ind); Henry Tucker (Ind Prog)
Rylstone	Liberal	Thomas Arkins	**John Fitzpatrick**		
St George	Liberal		**Joseph Carruthers**	William Flinn	
St Leonards	Liberal		**Edward Clark**	Peter O'Connell	Thomas Creswell (Ind Lib)
Sherbrooke	Progressive		John Roughley		**Broughton O'Conor** (Ind)
Sherbrooke	Progressive		John Roughley		Adam Pringle (Ind Lib)
Shoalhaven	Independent	**David Davis**	Mark Morton		
Singleton	Progressive	**Charles Dight**	Augustus Walker		Thomas Blick (Ind)
Sturt	Labour			Charles Maley	**William Ferguson** (Ind Lab)
Sydney-Belmore	Liberal	Eden George	**Sir James Graham**	William Gocher	John Donovan (Ind)
Sydney-Bligh	Progressive	**Patrick Quinn**	John Brindley	Daniel Healey	John Campbell (Ind Lib); John Hughes (Ind)
Sydney-Cook	Liberal	George Perry	**Samuel Whiddon**	Philip Mulholland	Henry Cato (Ind); John Griffin (Ind); William Hart (Ind Prog)
Sydney-Denison	Liberal		George Harris	Andrew Kelly	James Hynes (Ind); William Watts (Ind Lib)
Sydney-Fitzroy	Liberal		Daniel Levy	Donald McKinnon	**Henry Chapman** (Ind); Harry Foran (Ind Prog); Callaghan Garvan (Ind); Arthur McElhone (Ind Lib); Denis O'Sullivan (Ind)
Sydney-Flinders	Progressive	**Arthur Nelson**	John Waine	Frederick Sommerhoff	Hezekiah Evers (Ind Lib); Ernest Gardner (Ind Prog); James Lawrence (Ind Prog)
Sydney-Gipps	Progressive		Elliot Johnson	William Daley	**Wilfred Spruson** (Ind Prog)
Sydney-King	Liberal	Ernest Broughton	Thomas Hughes		David Fealy (Ind); Vincent Taylor (Ind Lib); Lindsay Thompson (Ind); Fred Walsh (Ind Lib); Alexander Wilson (Ind)
Sydney-Lang	Labour	Joseph Chuck	Evan Jones	John Power	Harry Holland (Soc)
Sydney-Phillip	Progressive	**Daniel O'Connor**	John Moloney	George Barnett	
Sydney-Pyrmont	Labour			**Samuel Smith**	John Sergeant (Ind Lib)
Tamworth	Progressive	Geoffrey Codrington	Albert Piddington		Raymond Walsh (Ind)
Tenterfield	Liberal		**Charles Lee**		
Tumut	Independent	**Robert Donaldson**	Charles Royle	James Elphick	
Tweed	Independent		Alexander Eastaughffe		**Richard Meagher** (Ind)
Uralla-Walcha	Progressive	**Michael MacMahon**	Charles Marsh		Frank Townshend (Ind); James Watts (Ind)
Wagga Wagga	Progressive	**James Gormly**			George Coleman (Ind Prog)
Wallsend	Labour			John Estell	James Moroney (Soc)
Waratah	Labour			**Arthur Griffith**	William Sharp (Ind Prog)
Warringah	Progressive		James Conroy		James Alderson (Ind Lib); Thomas Loxton (Ind Lib)
Warringah	Progressive		James Conroy		Ellison Quirk (Ind)
Waterloo	Liberal		**George Anderson**	Ernest Banner	Henry Maynard (Ind); James Morrish (Soc)
Waverley	Liberal		**Thomas Jessep**		Alfred Allen (Ind Lib); John Carroll (Ind); James Macarthur-Onslow (Ind); David Penfold (Ind)
Wellington	Liberal	John McEwen	**John Haynes**		
Wentworth	Progressive			Robert Scobie	Thomas Boynton (Ind); Alexander Cameron (Ind Lib); Harry Harben (Ind)
West Macquarie	Progressive	**Paddy Crick**	Otto Jaeger		
West Maitland	Liberal				**John Gillies** (Ind)
West Maitland	Liberal				Richard Proctor (Ind)
Wickham	Progressive	**John Fegan**	William Sheddon	George Errington	
Wilcannia	Labour			John Buzacott	Thomas Bell (Ind Lib)
Wilcannia	Labour			John Buzacott	**Richard Sleath** (Ind Lab)
Willoughby	Liberal		**George Howarth**	George Waite	Claude Leplastrier (Ind Lib)
Woollahra	Liberal		**John Garland**		William Latimer (Ind Lib)
Woronora	Liberal		Thomas Bissell	John Wonders	**John Nicholson** (Ind Lab)
Yass	Liberal	Bernard Grogan	**William Affleck**		
Young	Labour		James Rankin	George Burgess	John Lynch (Ind); Thomas Spring (Ind); Alphonso Tewksbury (Ind)

== See also ==
- Members of the New South Wales Legislative Assembly, 1901–1904
- Results of the 1901 New South Wales state election
