= Members of the New South Wales Legislative Assembly, 1901–1904 =

The members of the New South Wales Legislative Assembly who served in the 19th parliament of New South Wales from 1901 to 1904 were elected at the 1901 state election on 3 July 1901. The Speaker was William McCourt.

Name	Party	Electorate	Term in office
William Affleck	Liberal Reform	Yass	1894–1904
Edward Allen ^{11}	Liberal Reform	Illawarra	1904
George Anderson	Liberal Reform	Waterloo	1894–1904
William Archer	Independent	Burwood	1898–1904
James Ashton	Liberal Reform	Goulburn	1894–1907
John Barnes	Progressive	Gundagai	1889–1904
Walter Bennett	Progressive	Durham	1898–1907, 1917–1934
George Briner	Progressive	Raleigh	1901–1920
Ernest Broughton	Progressive	Sydney-King	1901–1910
James Brunker	Liberal Reform	East Maitland	1880–1904
George Burgess	Labour	Young	1901–1917
Frank Byrne	Independent	Hay	1898–1904
Alexander Campbell	Progressive	Kiama	1894–1904
Archibald Campbell ^{11}	Liberal Reform	Illawarra	1891–1903
John Cann	Labour	Broken Hill	1891–1916
James Carroll	Progressive	The Lachlan	1894–1904
Joseph Carruthers	Liberal Reform	St George	1887–1908
Albert Chapman	Progressive	Braidwood	1901–1904
Matthew Charlton ^{8}	Labour	Waratah	1903–1910
Patrick Clara ^{1}	Labour	Condoublin	1901–1904
Edward Clark	Liberal Reform	St Leonards	1891–1904, 1907–1910
Henry Clarke	Progressive	Bega	1869–1894, 1895–1904
John Cohen	Liberal Reform	Petersham	1898–1919
John Coleman	Independent Liberal	Lismore	1901–1905
Albert Collins	Liberal Reform	Narrabri	1901–1910
Paddy Crick	Progressive	West Macquarie	1889–1906
John Dacey	Labour	Botany	1895–1912
William Daley	Labour	Sydney-Gipps	1901–1907
Robert Davidson	Liberal Reform	The Hastings and The Macleay	1901–1910
William Davis	Progressive	Bourke	1889–1891, 1898–1904
William Dick	Liberal Reform	Newcastle East	1894–1907
Charles Dight	Progressive	Singleton	1898–1904
Robert Donaldson	Progressive	Tumut	1898–1913
Alfred Edden	Labour	Kahibah	1891–1920
John Estell	Labour	Wallsend	1901–1913, 1917–1922
Joseph Evans	Ind. Progressive	Deniliquin	1901–1904
James Fallick	Independent Liberal	Newtown-St Peters	1901–1920
Frank Farnell ^{12}	Independent Liberal	Ryde	1887–1903
John Fegan	Progressive	Wickham	1891–1907, 1920–1922
William Ferguson	Independent Labour	Sturt	1894–1904
John Fitzpatrick	Liberal Reform	Rylstone	1895–1904, 1907–1930
Thomas Fitzpatrick	Progressive	The Murrumbidgee	1894–1904
William Fleming	Liberal Reform	Robertson	1901–1910
John Garland ^{5}	Liberal Reform	Tamworth	1898–1901, 1903–1904
Eden George	Progressive	Sydney-Belmore	1901–1907
Owen Gilbert	Liberal Reform	Newcastle West	1901–1904, 1907–1910
John Gillies	Independent	West Maitland	1891–1911
James Gormly	Progressive	Wagga Wagga	1885–1904
Arthur Griffith ^{8}	Labour	Waratah	1894–1903, 1904–1920
Thomas Griffith	Independent	Albury	1898–1904
Brinsley Hall	Progressive	The Hawkesbury	1901–1917
David Hall	Labour	Gunnedah	1901–1904, 1913–1920
John Hawthorne	Liberal Reform	Leichhardt	1885–1891, 1894–1904
James Hayes	Progressive	The Murray	1885–1904
John Haynes	Liberal Reform	Wellington	1887–1904, 1915–1917
James Hogue	Liberal Reform	The Glebe	1894–1895, 1998-1910
Robert Hollis	Labour	Newtown-Erskine	1901–1917
William Holman	Labour	Grenfell	1898–1920
George Howarth ^{6}	Liberal Reform	Willoughby	1895–1903
John Hurley	Independent	Hartley	1872–1874 1876–1880, 1887–1891, 1901–1907
William Hurley	Progressive	The Macquarie	1895–1904
Thomas Jessep	Liberal Reform	Waverley	1896–1907
George Jones ^{3}	Labour	Inverell	1902–1913
Sydney Kearney ^{9}	Liberal Reform	Armidale	1903–1907
Andrew Kelly	Labour	Sydney-Denison	1891–1894, 1901–1913
John Kidd	Progressive	Camden	1880–1882, 1885–1887, 1889–1904
William Latimer	Liberal Reform	Woollahra	1901–1920
Sydney Law ^{4}	Labour / Independent Labour	Balmain South	1894–1907
Charles Lee	Liberal Reform	Tenterfield	1884–1920
Robert Levien	Progressive	Quirindi	1880–1889, 1889–1913
Daniel Levy	Liberal Reform	Sydney-Fitzroy	1901–1937
Edmund Lonsdale ^{9}	Liberal Reform	Armidale	1901–1903
Hugh Macdonald	Labour	The Castlereagh	1901–1906
Donald Macdonell	Labour	Cobar	1901–1911
Thomas Mackenzie	Liberal Reform	Canterbury	1901–1907
Michael MacMahon	Progressive	Uralla-Walcha	1900–1904
William Mahony	Liberal Reform	Annandale	1894–1910
William McCourt	Liberal Reform	Bowral	1882–1885, 1887–1913
Richard McCoy	Liberal Reform	Marrickville	1901–1910
John McFarlane	Progressive	The Clarence	1887–1915
James McGowen	Labour	Redfern	1891–1917
William McIntyre ^{3}	Progressive	Inverell	1901–1902
Gordon McLaurin	Progressive	The Hume	1901–1913
John McNeill ^{2}	Labour	Sydney-Pyrmont	1902–1913
Richard Meagher	Independent	The Tweed	1895, 1898–1904, 1907–1917
William Millard	Liberal Reform	Moruya	1894–1920, 1920–1921
Gus Miller	Labour	Monaro	1889–1918
Samuel Moore	Liberal Reform	Bingara	1885–1910
Mark Morton	Liberal Reform	The Shoalhaven	1901–1920, 1922–1938
Tom Moxham	Liberal Reform	Parramatta	1901–1916
Arthur Nelson	Progressive	Sydney-Flinders	1895–1904
Harry Newman	Liberal Reform	Orange	1891–1904
John Nicholson	Independent Labour	Woronora	1891–1917
Niels Nielsen	Labour	Boorowa	1899–1913
John Nobbs	Liberal Reform	Granville	1888–1993, 1898–1913
John Norton	Independent	Northumberland	1898–1906, 1907–1910
Charles Oakes	Liberal Reform	Paddington	1901–1910, 1917–1925
Daniel O'Connor	Progressive	Sydney-Phillip	1877–1891, 1900–1904
Broughton O'Conor	Independent	Sherbrooke	1898–1907
Edward O'Sullivan	Progressive	Queanbeyan	1885–1910
John Perry	Progressive	Ballina	1889–1920
Simeon Phillips	Liberal Reform	Dubbo	1895–1904
John Power	Labour	Sydney-Lang	1901–1904
Richard Price	Independent	Gloucester	1894–1904, 1907–1922
Robert Pyers	Progressive	The Richmond	1894–1904
Patrick Quinn	Progressive	Sydney-Bligh	1898–1904
Ellison Quirk	Independent	Warringah	1901–1904
Joseph Reymond	Progressive	Ashburnham	1895–1904
Edwin Richards	Progressive	Mudgee	1894–1904
Thomas Rose	Progressive	Argyle	1891–1904
Andrew Ross	Progressive	Molong	1880–1904
Robert Scobie	Labour	Wentworth	1901–1917
Sir John See	Progressive	Grafton	1880–1904
Richard Sleath	Independent Labour	Wilcannia	1894–1904
James Smith	Ind. Progressive	Newtown-Camperdown	1885–1887, 1901–1907
Samuel Smith ^{2}	Labour	Sydney-Pyrmont	1898–1902
Thomas Smith	Progressive	The Nepean	1877–1887, 1895–1898, 1901–1904
Percy Stirton ^{10}	Liberal Reform	Moree	1903–1904
David Storey	Liberal Reform	Randwick	1894–1920
John Storey	Labour	Balmain North	1901–1904, 1907–1921
Phillip Sullivan	Labour	Darlington	1901–1907
Edward Terry ^{12}	Independent Liberal	Ryde	1898–1901, 1904
Follett Thomas ^{7}	Independent Liberal	Glen Innes	1903–1920
John Thomson	Progressive	Manning	1901–1904
Thomas Waddell	Progressive	Cowra	1897–1917
Charles Wade ^{6}	Liberal Reform	Willoughby	1903–1917
Raymond Walsh ^{5}	Independent/Progressive	Tamworth	1901–1903
William Webster ^{10}	Labour	Moree	1901–1903
Samuel Whiddon	Liberal Reform	Sydney-Cook	1894–1904
William Williams	Independent Labour	Alma	1901–1904
William Willis	Progressive	The Barwon	1889–1904
Frederick Winchcombe	Liberal Reform	Ashfield	1900–1905
William Wood	Independent	Eden-Bombala	1894–1913
Francis Wright ^{7}	Progressive	Glen Innes	1882–1885, 1889–1903
William Young	Progressive	Bathurst	1900–1907

By-elections

Under the constitution, ministers were required to resign to recontest their seats in a by-election when appointed. These by-elections are only noted when the minister was defeated; in general, he was elected unopposed.

#	Electorate	Departing Member	Party	Reason for By-election	Date of By-election	Winner of By-election	Party
1	Condoublin	Patrick Clara	Labour	Election overturned on appeal	4 November 1901	Patrick Clara	Labour
2	Sydney-Pyrmont	Samuel Smith	Labour	Appointment to Arbitration Court	24 May 1902	John McNeill	Labour
3	Inverell	William McIntyre	Progressive	Death	31 May 1902	George Jones	Labour
4	Balmain South	Sydney Law	Labour	Refused Caucus solidarity pledge	6 December 1902	Sydney Law	Independent Labour
5	Tamworth	Raymond Walsh	Progressive	Bankruptcy	4 April 1903	John Garland	Liberal Reform
6	Willoughby	George Howarth	Liberal Reform	Bankruptcy	9 September 1903	Charles Wade	Liberal Reform
7	Glen Innes	Francis Wright	Progressive	Death	28 October 1903	Follett Thomas	Liberal Reform
8	Waratah	Arthur Griffith	Labour	Unsuccessful candidate for Senate at federal election	5 December 1903	Matthew Charlton	Labour
9	Armidale	Edmund Lonsdale	Liberal Reform	Successful candidate for New England at federal election	12 December 1903	Sydney Kearney	Liberal Reform
10	Moree	William Webster	Labour	Successful candidate for Gwydir at federal election	12 December 1903	Percy Stirton	Liberal Reform
11	Illawarra	Archibald Campbell	Liberal Reform	Death	9 January 1904	Edward Allen	Liberal Reform
12	Ryde	Frank Farnell	Independent Liberal	Appointment to Fisheries Board	23 January 1904	Edward Terry	Independent Liberal

== See also ==
- See ministry
- Waddell ministry
- Results of the 1901 New South Wales state election
- Candidates of the 1901 New South Wales state election
