= 1891 Illawarra colonial by-election =

By-election in New South Wales, Australia

A by-election for the seat of Illawarra in the New South Wales Legislative Assembly was held on 3 October 1891 because the Elections and Qualifications Committee declared that the election of John Nicholson and Andrew Lysaght Sr. at the election for Illawarra in June was void because of there were insufficient printed ballot papers and handwritten papers were used.

== Dates ==
Date	Event
24 June 1891	Illawarra election.
11 July 1891	Alexander Artis filed a petition against the election.
16 September 1891	Illawarra by-election declared void.
22 September 1891	Writ of election issued by the Speaker of the Legislative Assembly.
28 September 1891	Nominations
3 October 1891	Polling day
19 October 1891	Return of writ

== Result ==
1891 Illawarra by-election Saturday 3 October
Party	Candidate	Votes	%	±%
Labour	John Nicholson (elected 1)	1,432	37.3	
Free Trade	Archibald Campbell (elected 2)	1,055	27.5	
Protectionist	Andrew Lysaght Sr. defeated	1,009	26.3	
Free Trade	Joseph Mitchell	344	9.0	
Total formal votes		3,840	99.4	
Informal votes		24	0.6	
Turnout		3,864	59.4	
Labour hold 1				
Free Trade gain 1 from Protectionist				

== See also ==
- Electoral results for the district of Illawarra
- List of New South Wales state by-elections
