= 1904 Illawarra state by-election =

Election result for Illawarra, New South Wales, Australia

A by-election was held for the New South Wales Legislative Assembly electorate of Illawarra on 9 January 1904 because of the death of Archibald Campbell (Liberal Reform).

== Dates ==
Date	Event
14 December 1903	Archibald Campbell died.
19 December 1903	Writ of election issued by the Speaker of the Legislative Assembly.
31 December 1903	Nominations
9 January 1904	Polling day
25 January 1904	Return of writ

== Result ==
1904 Illawarra by-election Saturday 9 January
Party	Candidate	Votes	%	±%
Liberal Reform	Edward Allen	716	42.5	−37.1
Progressive	Andrew Lysaght Sr.	563	33.5	
Labour	David Ritchie	404	24.0	
Total formal votes		1,683	100.0	+0.3
Informal votes		0	0.0	−0.3
Turnout		1,683	62.7	+20.1
Liberal Reform hold				

== See also ==
- Electoral results for the district of Illawarra
- List of New South Wales state by-elections
