= 1866 Illawarra colonial by-election =

By-election in New South Wales, Australia

A by-election was held for the New South Wales Legislative Assembly electorate of Illawarra on 10 September 1866, following the resignation of Patrick Osborne.

== Dates ==
Date	Event
24 August 1866	Patrick Osborne resigned.
28 August 1860	Writ of election issued by the Speaker of the Legislative Assembly.
6 September 1866	Nominations
10 September 1866	Polling day
18 September 1866	Return of writ

== Candidates ==
John Stewart had been the unsuccessful candidate at the 1860 election, receiving 46.% of the vote, and again at the 1864 election receiving 43.3% of the vote.

== Result ==
1866 Illawarra by-election Monday 10 September
Candidate	Votes	%
John Stewart (elected)	460	56.7
Joseph Wilshire	352	43.3
Total formal votes	812	100.0
Informal votes	0	0.0
Turnout	812	63.1

== See also ==
- Electoral results for the district of Illawarra
- List of New South Wales state by-elections
