= Electoral results for the district of Balmain North =

Election results for Balmain North, New South Wales, Australia

Balmain North, an electoral district of the Legislative Assembly in the Australian state of New South Wales was created in 1894 and abolished in 1904.

== Members ==
Election	Member	Party
1894	Bill Wilks	Free Trade
1895	Bill Wilks	Free Trade
1898	Bill Wilks	Free Trade
1901	John Storey	Labour

== Election results ==
=== Elections in the 1900s ===
==== 1901 ====
1901 New South Wales state election: Balmain North
Party	Candidate	Votes	%	±%
Labour	John Storey	922	42.4	
Liberal Reform	Gilbert Murdoch	505	23.2	−28.4
Progressive	Alexander Milne	411	18.9	+0.2
Independent Liberal	William Ward	277	12.7	
Total formal votes		2,177	99.5	−
Informal votes		12	0.6	−
Turnout		2,189	65.8	+3.7
Labour gain from Liberal Reform				

The sitting member was Bill Wilks (Liberal Reform) who did not contest the election as he had been elected in March 1901 to the federal seat of Dalley which included Balmain.

=== Elections in the 1890s ===
==== 1898 ====
1898 New South Wales colonial election: Balmain North
Party	Candidate	Votes	%	±%
Free Trade	Bill Wilks	965	51.6	
Independent Federalist	Alexander Milne	556	29.7	
National Federal	Leonard Green	350	18.7	
Total formal votes		1,871	99.4	
Informal votes		11	0.6	
Turnout		1,882	62.1	
Free Trade hold				

==== 1895 ====
1895 New South Wales colonial election: Balmain North
Party	Candidate	Votes	%	±%
Free Trade	Bill Wilks	1,055	65.4	
Protectionist	Alexander Milne	523	32.4	
Ind. Free Trade	Frank Smith	36	2.2	
Total formal votes		1,614	99.5	
Informal votes		9	0.6	
Turnout		1,623	62.3	
Free Trade hold				

==== 1894 ====
1894 New South Wales colonial election: Balmain North
Party	Candidate	Votes	%	±%
Free Trade	Bill Wilks	999	45.1	
Protectionist	William Murphy	618	27.9	
Labour	Samuel Kirby	340	15.4	
Ind. Free Trade	James Wheeler	258	11.7	
Total formal votes		2,215	99.0	
Informal votes		22	1.0	
Turnout		2,237	84.2	
Free Trade win		(new seat)		
