= 1880 Illawarra colonial by-election =

By-election in New South Wales, Australia

A by-election was held for the New South Wales Legislative Assembly electorate of Illawarra on 7 July 1880 following the resignation of Samuel Gray.

== Dates ==
Date	Event
22 June 1880	Samuel Gray resigned.
23 June 1880	Writ of election issued by the Speaker of the Legislative Assembly.
5 July 1880	Nominations
7 July 1880	Polling day
17 July 1880	Return of writ

== Result ==
1880 Illawarra by-election Wednesday 7 July
Candidate	Votes	%
Alexander Stuart (elected)	686	60.3
Andrew Lysaght Sr.	437	38.4
Peter Orvad	14	1.2
Total formal votes	1,137	100.0
Informal votes	0	0.0
Turnout	1,137	70.9

== See also ==
- Electoral results for the district of Illawarra
- List of New South Wales state by-elections
