= 1901 New South Wales state election =

State election for New South Wales, Australia

- 3 July 1901

All 125 seats in the New South Wales Legislative Assembly 63 Assembly seats were needed for a majority
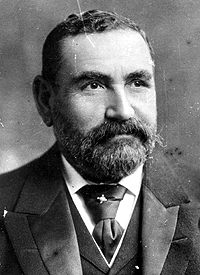

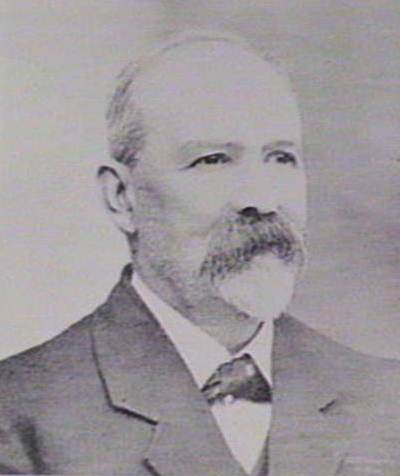

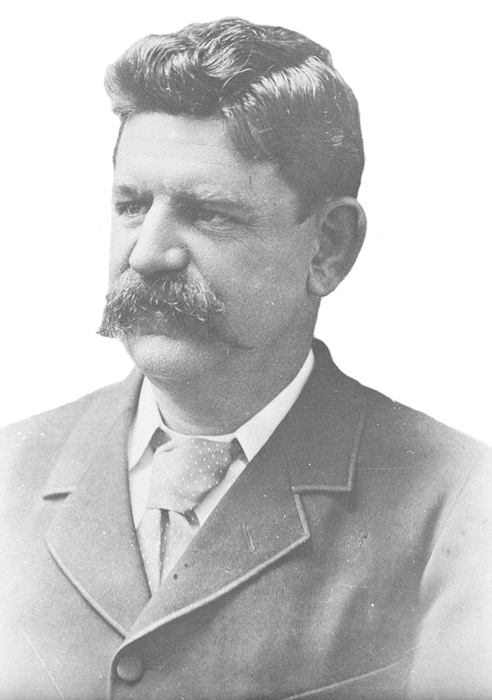
	First party	Second party	Third party
Leader	John See	Charles Lee	James McGowen
Party	Progressive	Liberal Reform	Labor
Leader since	28 March 1901	April 1901	August 1894
Leader's seat	Grafton	Tenterfield	Redfern
Last election	52 seats	45 seats	19 seats
Seats won	42 seats	37 seats	24 seats
Seat change	▼10	▼8	▲5
Percentage	22.99%	33.55%	18.44%
Swing	▼20.04	▲0.66	▲6.26
- Results of the election, showing the winning vote share of the elected member.
Premier before election
John See
Progressive
Premier after election
John See
Progressive

The 1901 New South Wales state election was held on 3 July 1901 for all of the 125 seats in the 19th New South Wales Legislative Assembly and it was conducted in single-member constituencies with a first past the post voting system. The Parliamentary Electorates Act of 1893 had conferred the right to vote on every male British subject over 21 years of age who was resident in New South Wales for a year or more. The 19th parliament of New South Wales was dissolved on 11 June 1901 by the Governor, Lord Beauchamp, on the advice of the Premier, John See.

== Background ==
The federation of the Australian colonies in 1901 saw 18 members of the parliament of New South Wales transition to the new federal parliament, including the incumbent premier William Lyne and opposition leader George Reid. Lyne resigned as premier in March 1901 and was succeeded by John See. Their party, previously known as the Protectionists, had contested the 1898 election as the National Federal Party on an explicitly pro-federation platform. Charles Lee succeeded Reid as leader of the Free Trade Party and opposition leader in April 1901, while James McGowen remained as leader of the Labor Party.

With the political issues of federation resolved and the "fiscal question" of tariff policy removed to the federal sphere, both the non-Labor parties adopted new names for the 1901 election. The Free Trade Party renamed itself the Liberal Party of New South Wales in April 1901, while the National Federal Party was renamed the Progressive Party the following month.

== Key dates ==
Date	Event
11 June 1901	The Legislative Assembly was dissolved, and writs were issued by the Governor to proceed with an election.
22 June 1901	Nominations for candidates for the election closed at noon.
3 July 1901	Polling day.
23 July 1901	Opening of 19th Parliament.

== Results ==
New South Wales state election, 3 July 1901 Legislative Assembly << 1898–1904 >>
Enrolled voters	345,500				
Votes cast	194,980		Turnout	62.84	+2.23
Informal votes	1,534		Informal	0.78	−0.14
Summary of votes by party
Party	Primary votes	%	Swing	Seats	Change
Liberal Reform	65,420	33.55	+0.66	37	−8
Progressive	44,817	22.99	−20.04	42	−10
Labour	35,952	18.44	+6.26	24	+5
Independent	21,595	11.08	+8.09	12	+8
Independent Liberal	16,770	8.60	+6.72	4	+3
Ind. Progressive	6,533	3.35	−3.68	2	−2
Independent Labor	3,565	1.83	+1.82	4	+4
Socialist Labor	328	0.17	+0.17	0	±0
Total	194,980			125	

Popular vote
Liberal Reform	33.55%
Progressive	22.99%
Labor	18.44%
Independent	11.08%
Ind. Liberal	8.60%
Ind. Progressive	3.35%
Ind. Labor	1.83%
Socialist Labor	0.17%
Parliamentary seats
Progressive	42
Liberal Reform	37
Labor	24
Independent	12
Ind. Liberal	4
Ind. Labor	4
Ind. Progressive	2

== Retiring members ==
=== Progressive ===
- Joseph Abbott MLA (Wentworth)
- John Chanter MLA (Deniliquin) — elected to the federal House of Representatives
- Austin Chapman MLA (Braidwood) — elected to the federal House of Representatives
- Francis Clarke MLA (Hastings and Macleay) — elected to the federal House of Representatives
- George Cruickshank MLA (Inverell) — elected to the federal House of Representatives
- Thomas Ewing MLA (Lismore) — elected to the federal House of Representatives
- Thomas Goodwin MLA (Gunnedah)
- Thomas Hassall MLA (Moree)
- William Sawers MLA (Tamworth) — elected to the federal House of Representatives
- Dugald Thomson MLA (Warringah) — elected to the federal House of Representatives. (Note: Dugald Thomson had been elected as member of the Progressive party in 1898, then known as the National Federal party, described as a free trade federationist.)

=== Liberal ===
- Joseph Cook MLA (Hartley) — elected to the federal House of Representatives
- Francis Cotton MLA (Newtown-Camperdown)
- Sir Matthew Harris MLA (Sydney-Denison)
- Francis McLean MLA (Marrickville) — elected to the federal House of Representatives
- John Neild MLA (Paddington) — elected to the federal Senate
- George Reid MLA (Sydney-King) — elected to the federal House of Representatives
- Bill Wilks MLA (Balmain North) — elected to the federal House of Representatives

=== Labor ===
- Thomas Brown MLA (Condoublin) — elected to the federal House of Representatives
- Billy Hughes MLA (Sydney-King) — elected to the federal House of Representatives
- William Spence MLA (Cobar) — elected to the federal House of Representatives
- Josiah Thomas MLA (Alma) — elected to the federal House of Representatives
- James Thomson MLA (Newcastle West)
- David Watkins MLA (Wallsend) — elected to the federal House of Representatives
- Chris Watson MLA (Young) — elected to the federal House of Representatives

=== Independent ===
- John McLaughlin MLA (Raleigh)

== Changing seats ==
Seats changing hands (Note: Compares members at the 1898 election and the 1901 election and does not include the seats of Canterbury where the seat was won by an independent at a by-election but was regained by the Liberal Reform Party at the 1901 election.)
Seat	1898		1901	
Seat	Party	Member	Party	Member
Alma	Labour	Josiah Thomas (Note: Elected to the federal parliament.)	Independent Labour	William Williams
Armidale	Progressive	Charles Wilson	Liberal Reform	Edmund Lonsdale
Balmain North	Liberal Reform	Bill Wilks	Labour	John Storey
Boorowa	Progressive	Kenneth Mackay (Note: Kenneth Mackay was appointed to the Legislative Council and Niels Nielsen won the seat at the by-election.)	Labour	Niels Nielsen
Darlington	Liberal Reform	Thomas Clarke	Labour	Phillip Sullivan
Deniliquin	Progressive	John Chanter	Ind. Progressive	Joseph Evans
Gunnedah	Progressive	Thomas Goodwin (Note: Did not contest the election.)	Labour	David Hall
Hartley	Liberal Reform	Joseph Cook	Independent	John Hurley
The Hastings and The Macleay	Progressive	Francis Clarke	Liberal Reform	Robert Davidson
The Hawkesbury	Liberal Reform	William Morgan	Progressive	Brinsley Hall
Lismore	Progressive	Thomas Ewing	Independent Liberal	John Coleman
Manning	Liberal Reform	James Young	Progressive	John Thomson
Moree	Progressive	Thomas Hassall	Labour	William Webster
Narrabri	Labour	Hugh Ross (Note: Unsuccessfully contested Quirindi.)	Liberal Reform	Albert Collins
Nepean	Liberal Reform	Samuel Lees	Progressive	Thomas Smith
Newcastle West	Labour	James Thomson	Liberal Reform	Owen Gilbert
Newtown-Camperdown	Liberal Reform	Francis Cotton	Ind. Progressive	James Smith
Newtown-Erskine	Liberal Reform	Edmund Molesworth	Labour	Robert Hollis
Newtown-St Peters	Liberal Reform	William Rigg	Independent Liberal	James Fallick
Northumberland	Progressive	Richard Stevenson (Note: Richard Stevenson died in 1899 and John Norton won the seat in a by-election, retaining it uncontested at the 1901 election.)	Independent Liberal	John Norton
Parramatta	Ind. Progressive	William Ferris	Liberal Reform	Tom Moxham
Raleigh	Independent	John McLaughlin	Progressive	George Briner
Robertson	Progressive	Robert Fitzgerald	Liberal Reform	William Fleming
Ryde	Ind. Progressive	Edward Terry	Independent Liberal	Frank Farnell
Shoalhaven	Ind. Progressive	David Davis	Liberal Reform	Mark Morton
Sydney-Belmore	Liberal Reform	Sir James Graham	Progressive	Eden George
Sydney-Denison	Liberal Reform	Sir Matthew Harris	Labour	Andrew Kelly
Sydney-Gipps	Progressive	Wilfred Spruson	Labour	William Daley
Sydney-King	Liberal Reform	George Reid	Progressive	Ernest Broughton
Tamworth	Progressive	William Sawers	Independent	Raymond Walsh
Warringah	Progressive	Dugald Thomson	Independent	Ellison Quirk
Wentworth	Progressive	Joseph Abbott	Labour	Robert Scobie
Woollahra	Liberal Reform	John Garland	Independent Liberal	William Latimer
Members changing party
Seat	1898		1901	
Seat	Party	Member	Party	Member
Albury	Progressive	Thomas Griffith	Independent	Thomas Griffith
Eden-Bombala	Progressive	William Wood	Independent	William Wood
Gloucester	Progressive	Richard Price	Independent	Richard Price
Hay	Liberal Reform	Frank Byrne	Independent	Frank Byrne
Manaro	Progressive	Gus Miller	Labour	Gus Miller
Petersham	Progressive	John Cohen	Liberal Reform	John Cohen
Quirindi	Independent	Robert Levien	Progressive	Robert Levien
Sherbrooke	Progressive	Broughton O'Conor	Independent	Broughton O'Conor
Sturt	Labour	William Ferguson	Independent Labour	William Ferguson
Tumut	Independent	Robert Donaldson	Progressive	Robert Donaldson
West Maitland	Liberal Reform	John Gillies	Independent	John Gillies
Wickham	Liberal Reform	John Fegan	Progressive	John Fegan
Wilcannia	Labour	Richard Sleath	Independent Labour	Richard Sleath
Woronora	Liberal Reform	John Nicholson	Independent Labour	John Nicholson

== See also ==
- Candidates of the 1901 New South Wales state election
- Members of the New South Wales Legislative Assembly, 1901–1904
