= Patrick Osborne =

Patrick Osborne may refer to:

- Patrick Osborne (animator), American animator and film director
- Patrick Osborne (rugby union) (born 1987), Fijian rugby union footballer
- Patrick Osborne (politician) (1832–1902), Australian politician
- Patrick Osbourne, a character in the TV series Revenge
