= Andrew Lysaght =

Andrew Lysaght may refer to:

- Andrew Lysaght Jr. (1873–1933), Australian politician
- Andrew Lysaght Sr. (1832–1906), Australian politician
