= Terry Rumble =

Australian politician

- Born: Terrence John Rumble; 31 October 1942 (age 84); Bangalow, New South Wales, Australia
- Education: Christian Brothers College, Wollongong; Wollongong Technical College
- Occupation: former politician
- Years active: 1988–1999
- Known for: member for Illawarra in the New South Wales Legislative Assembly
- Political party: Labor
- Spouse: Patricia (m. 1973)
- Children: 2
- Parents: Hubert Rumble (father); Kathleen Rumble (mother)

Terrence John "Terry" Rumble (born 31 October 1942) is a former Australian politician. He was the Labor member for Illawarra in the New South Wales Legislative Assembly from 1988 to 1999.

Rumble was born at Bangalow, New South Wales, to parents Hubert and Kathleen. He attended Christian Brothers College at Wollongong and then Wollongong Technical College, working as a shop assistant, clerk and public servant. He eventually qualified as an accountant. In 1962 he joined the Labor Party, and was active in the Unanderra branch. He married Patricia on 19 June 1973; they had two children.

In 1987, the Labor member for the local state seat of Illawarra, George Petersen, resigned from the party and formed his own group, the Illawarra Workers Party. Rumble was preselected as the replacement candidate, and at the 1988 election won easily. He was relatively unchallenged at the 1991 and 1995 elections, and retired in 1999; he was replaced by Marianne Saliba.

New South Wales Legislative Assembly
Preceded by George Petersen	Member for Illawarra; 1988–1999	Succeeded by Marianne Saliba
