= Francis Woodward (Australian politician) =

Australian politician

Francis Woodward (22 June 1846 – 14 September 1905) was an Australian politician.

He was born in Goulburn to storekeeper James Woodward and his wife Christina. A solicitor who practised in Wollongong, he married Emily Mary Ann Allen on 9 March 1871; they had eight children. In 1887 he was elected to the New South Wales Legislative Assembly as the Free Trade member for Illawarra. He was re-elected in 1889 but did not contest the 1891 election. Woodward died at Newtown in 1905.

New South Wales Legislative Assembly
Preceded by Andrew Lysaght	Member for Illawarra; 1887–1891; Served alongside: none/Joseph Mitchell	Succeeded by Andrew Lysaght; John Nicholson
