= Marianne Saliba =

New South Wales politician

Mayor of the City of Shellharbour
- In office 17 September 2012 – 23 December 2021
- Preceded by: Kellie Marsh
- Succeeded by: Chris Homer

Member of the New South Wales Legislative Assembly for Illawarra
- In office 27 March 1999 – 24 March 2007
- Preceded by: Terry Rumble
- Succeeded by: District abolished

Personal details
- Born: Marianne Frances Hudson; 16 April 1960 (age 66) Barrhead, Scotland
- Party: Independent (since 2022)
- Other political affiliations: Labor (1990−2022)
- Spouse: Les Dawes
- Education: University of Wollongong

Marianne Frances Saliba (born 16 April 1960) is an Australian former politician. She was the mayor of the City of Shellharbour from 2012 to 23 December 2021. She was a member of the New South Wales Legislative Assembly from 1999 to 2007, representing the (now abolished) electorate of Illawarra.

Saliba is the daughter of Alex and May Hudson and was the born in Barrhead, Scotland and migrated to Australia in 1964 with her parents. She was educated at St Anne's College, Dapto and did Secretarial Studies at the Dapto TAFE. She completed her Bachelor of Education at the University of Wollongong in 1999. She later worked for Terry Rumble, former member for Illawarra. She is married with four adopted children, Matthew, Dennis, Sara and Alexandra.

Saliba represented Illawarra for the Labor Party from March 1999 to March 2007. She was a member of multiple parliamentary, caucus and community committees and social organizations. Most notably, Marianne was Temporary Chairman of Committees (2003–2007); Member of the NSW Regulation Review Committee (1999- 2003); NSW Joint Select Committee on Victims’ Compensation (1999–2000); Vice Chairman NSW Legislative Review Committee (2003–2004); NSW Joint Standing Committee on Road Safety (Staysafe) (2003–2005); and Chairman NSW Joint Standing Committee on Electoral Matters (2004–2007). She retired from parliament at the 2007 election and the seat was renamed Shellharbour.

In 2011, she re-entered politics and was elected Deputy Lord Mayor for the Shellharbour City Council, under Liberal Mayor Kellie Marsh.

In 2012, she was elected Mayor of the City of Shellharbour but lost to Chris Homer in 2021 in a direct election.

Subsequently, in 2022 she contested a by-election for Ward A on Shellharbour City Council but received only 11.1% of the vote and was defeated.

Because she contested the ward against a Labor endorsed candidate, she is no longer a member of the Labor Party.

New South Wales Legislative Assembly
Preceded by Terry Rumble	Member for Illawarra; 1999–2007	District abolished
