= James Osborne (politician) =

Australian politician (1845–1877)

James Osborne (24 September 1845 – 11 April 1877) was an Australian politician.

He was born at Marshall Mount near Wollongong to Henry Osborne and Sarah Marshall. He advocated for pastoralism on the Murrumbidgee River before entering politics. In 1869 he was elected to the New South Wales Legislative Assembly for Illawarra, a seat his brother Patrick had already represented from 1864 to 1866. Their father had been a member of New South Wales Legislative Council (1851–1856) and Legislative Assembly (1856–57).

James Osborne retired in 1872, and died in Sydney in 1877.

New South Wales Legislative Assembly
Preceded by John Stewart	Member for Illawarra; 1869–1872	Succeeded by William Forster
