= Robert Haworth (politician) =

English-born Australian politician

Robert Haworth (1801 – 21 December 1875) was an English-born Australian politician.

He was born at Bury in Lancashire to Richard Haworth and Lizzie Burch. He married Alice Whittaker around 1822, with whom he had eight children; a second marriage on 7 October 1854 to Thirza Tapp Webber produced a further four children. He migrated to Australia around 1835. In 1860 he was elected to the New South Wales Legislative Assembly for Illawarra, but he did not re-contest in 1864. Haworth died at Wollongong in 1875.

New South Wales Legislative Assembly
Preceded by Samuel Gordon	Member for Illawarra; 1860–1864	Succeeded by Patrick Osborne
