= Alexander James Campbell =

Australian politician

Alexander James Campbell (20 August 1846 – 22 March 1926) was an Australian politician.

He was born in Gerringong to Ewen Campbell and Margaret McLean. He worked as an auctioneer around Kiama and Shoalhaven and directed the local steam navigation company. On 11 November 1869 he married Margaret Sharpe, with whom he had nine children. In 1894 he was elected to the New South Wales Legislative Assembly as the member for Kiama; he served until he was defeated in 1904 running for Allowrie. During this time he was generally affiliated with the Protectionist Party. Campbell died at Gerringong in 1926. His brother Archibald was the member for the neighbouring seat of Illawarra.

New South Wales Legislative Assembly
| Preceded by George Fuller | Member for Kiama; 1894–1904 | Abolished |
