= John Stewart (New South Wales colonial politician) =

Australian politician

John Stewart (1 October 1810 – 30 July 1896) was an English-born Australian politician.

He was born in Northumberland to estate agent Malcolm Stewart and Elizabeth Scott. He graduated from the Royal Veterinary College at Edinburgh in 1827 and was a professor at the Andersonian University in Glasgow from 1834 to 1840. In 1841 he migrated to Sydney, where he married Sarah Pringle on 1 November 1842; they had four children. He established a practice which he ran until 1852, when he retired to Keira Vale. He moved back to Sydney in 1866, when he was elected to the New South Wales Legislative Assembly for Illawarra. Defeated in 1869, he was returned for Kiama in 1871, serving until his defeat in 1874. In 1879 he was appointed to the New South Wales Legislative Council. He resumed veterinary practice in 1882. He left the Legislative Council in 1895 and died at Summer Hill the following year.

New South Wales Legislative Assembly
Preceded by Patrick Osborne	Member for Illawarra; 1866–1869	Succeeded by James Osborne
Preceded by Henry Parkes	Member for Kiama; 1871–1874	Succeeded by Samuel Charles
