= Robert Pillans =

Australian politician (1860–1941)

Robert Pillans (30 December 1860 – 31 August 1941) was a Scottish-born Australian politician.

He was born at Rootpark in Lanarkshire to coalminer William Pillans and Janet Muir. He migrated to New South Wales in 1885, becoming a coalminer at Minmi. On 7 January 1889 he married Grace Blackley, with whom he had three sons. He eventually settled at Lithgow, where he was involved in the Miners' Union and the Australian Coal and Shale Employees' Federation. From 1911 to 1934 he served as a local alderman, and he was mayor from 1912 to 1918 and from 1923 to 1927. From 1925 to 1934 he was a Labor member of the New South Wales Legislative Council. Pillans died at Lidcombe in 1941.
