= Edward Allen (Australian politician) =

Australian politician and journalist

Edward Allen (5 March 1862 – 17 August 1936) was an Australian politician and journalist.

He was born at Shellharbour to dairy farmer John Walter Allen and Charlotte Dunstan. He attended public schools at Shellharbour and Kiama, and later became a grocer and postmaster. He married Anne Mary Elizabeth Lancaster, with whom he had a son. In January 1904, he was elected in a by-election to the New South Wales Legislative Assembly as the Liberal member for Illawarra, but he was defeated running for Wollongong at the general election in July of that year. He became proprietor and editor of the Illawarra Mercury from 1904 to 1910, and then from 1910 to 1914 served in the same capacity for the Gulgong Advertiser. From 1909 to 1913 he was on the committee of the New South Wales Country Press Association. After moving to Sydney, he represented the South and Western districts for the Sydney Morning Herald. Allen retired from journalism in 1930, and died at Waverton in 1936.

New South Wales Legislative Assembly
Preceded by Archibald Campbell	Member for Illawarra; 1904	Abolished
