= Electoral district of Sydney-King =

Former state electoral district of New South Wales, Australia

Sydney-King was an electoral district of the Legislative Assembly in the Australian state of New South Wales, created in 1894 in central Sydney from part of the electoral district of East Sydney and named after Governor King. It was initially east of George Street, north of Liverpool Street and Oxford Street and west of Riley Street. It also included Lord Howe Island. In 1904, its name was changed to King.

== Members for King ==
Member	Party	Term
George Reid	Free Trade	1894–1901
Ernest Broughton	Progressive	1901–1904

== Election results ==
1901 New South Wales state election: Sydney-King
Party	Candidate	Votes	%	±%
Progressive	Ernest Broughton	550	37.6	−8.3
Liberal Reform	Thomas Hughes	532	36.3	−17.3
Independent	Alexander Wilson	150	10.3	
Independent	Ernest Thompson	128	8.7	
Independent Liberal	Fred Walsh	91	6.2	
Independent	David Fealy	9	0.6	
Independent Liberal	Vincent Taylor	4	0.3	
Total formal votes		1,464	99.0	−0.3
Informal votes		15	1.0	+0.3
Turnout		1,479	53.0	−1.1
Progressive gain from Liberal Reform				

The sitting member was George Reid (Liberal Reform) who did not contest the election as he had been elected in March 1901 to the federal seat of East Sydney.
