= Patrick Osborne (politician) =

Australian politician (1832–1902)

Pat Hill Osborne (20 May 1832 – 17 October 1902) was an Australian politician.

He was born at Marshall Mount to Henry Osborne, and Sarah Marshall. He was educated in England and became a pastoralist on his return to New South Wales. On 27 January 1864 he married Elizabeth Jane Atkinson, with whom he had nine children. His father had been a member of New South Wales Legislative Council (1851–1856) and New South Wales Legislative Assembly (1856–57). In 1864 Osbourne was elected to the Legislative Assembly for Illawarra, but he resigned in 1866. His brother James would later represent the seat from 1869 until 1872.

Osborne died at Currandooley station near Lake George in 1902.

New South Wales Legislative Assembly
Preceded by Robert Haworth	Member for Illawarra; 1864–1866	Succeeded by John Stewart
