= Thomas Griffith (Australian politician) =

Australian politician

Thomas Hunter Griffith (13 May 1842 – 15 August 1913) was an Australian politician, member of the New South Wales Legislative Assembly.

Griffith was born in Santa Cruz, West Indies, to Irish parents Thomas Griffith (sugar planter) and Mary Anne, née Hunter. He spent time in Ireland and returned to Santa Cruz to manage sugar plantations. He then arrived in Victoria in the 1860s and became a farmer. He was an alderman of Albury Council from 1886 to 1892 and mayor 1887 and 1891.

Griffith was elected to the seat of Albury in the New South Wales Legislative Assembly on 27 July 1898, holding it until 16 July 1904. Griffith supported the Federation movement.

New South Wales Legislative Assembly
| Preceded by John Wilkinson | Member for Albury; 1898–1904 | Succeeded by Gordon McLaurin |
