= Bill Wilks =

Australian politician (1863–1940)

The Honourable Bill Wilks
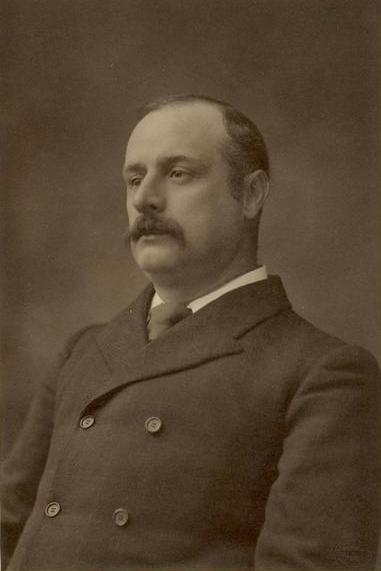

Member of the Australian Parliament for Dalley
- In office 29 March 1901 – 13 April 1910
- Preceded by: New seat
- Succeeded by: Robert Howe

Personal details
- Born: 21 June 1863 Sydney
- Died: 5 February 1940 (aged 76) Camberwell, Victoria
- Party: Free Trade (1901–06); Anti-Socialist (1906–09); Liberal (1909–10
- Spouse(s): Florence Matilda Vincent (m. 1894–1926); Edna Eunice Hinchcliffe (m. 1927–1940)
- Children: 5
- Occupation: Fuel merchant

William Henry Wilks (21 June 1863 – 5 February 1940) was an Australian politician.

== Early life ==
Wilks was born in Sydney to English sea captain Joseph Henry Wilks and Susannah, née Harris. He was educated at Balmain Public School and, before establishing a wood and coal yard at Balmain, became associated with Billy Hughes. He was elected to the council of the Free Trade Association of New South Wales in 1887, having already been president of the New South Wales Literary and Debating Societies' Union previously.

Wilks, a Freemason, was the grand master of the Grand Lodge of Scotland in 1888. He became involved in politics, being associated with the Loyal Orange Institution of New South Wales, and supported the entry of Labor into the New South Wales Parliament in 1891 due to his "strong democratic views". He himself was a member of the Free Trade Party, and became associated with its more radical section, led by George Reid. He married Florence Matilda Vincent in Sydney on 19 July 1894.

== State politics ==
In 1894 Wilks was elected to the New South Wales Legislative Assembly for the Free Trade Party for the new district of Balmain North.

Wilks was a strong supporter of Premier Reid while in the New South Wales Parliament, and attempted unsuccessfully to defuse an 1899 censure motion against Reid with an amendment separating the issue of John Neild's payment from the main motion. He also believed that the motion was motivated by an attempt to ensure that Reid did not become the first Prime Minister of Australia.

== Federal politics ==
Wilks transferred to federal politics in the inaugural federal election in 1901, and was elected to the seat of Dalley. He was whip in the 1904–1905 Reid government, and was useful to his leader in the controversies surrounding Cardinal Patrick Francis Moran. He was defeated by Labor in 1910.

== Later life ==
After his defeat in 1910 Wilks became a land valuer in Melbourne until he retired in 1928. Following his wife Florence's death in 1926, he had married Edna Eunice Hinchcliffe in Melbourne on 6 August 1927. He died on 5 February 1940 at Camberwell, and was survived by his wife, and two sons and three daughters of his first marriage. He was buried at Box Hill.

New South Wales Legislative Assembly
New district	Member for Balmain North; 1894–1901	Succeeded by John Storey
Parliament of Australia
New parliament	Member for Dalley; 1901–1910	Succeeded by Robert Howe
