= Electoral district of Balmain North =

Former state electoral district of New South Wales, Australia

Balmain North was an electoral district of the Legislative Assembly in the Australian state of New South Wales from 1894. It was abolished in the 1904 re-distribution of electorates following the 1903 New South Wales referendum, which required the number of members of the Legislative Assembly to be reduced from 125 to 90, and was reabsorbed into the district of Balmain.

== Members for Balmain North ==
Member	Party	Term
Bill Wilks	Free Trade	1894–1901
John Storey	Labour	1901–1904
