= Andrew Lysaght Sr. =

Politician from NSW, Australia (1832–1906)

Andrew Lysaght (1 October 1832 – 3 September 1906) was an Australian politician.

Born in Fairy Meadow, he spent many years as a publican of the Queens Hotel in Wollongong. An alderman of Northern Illawarra Council who served several terms as mayor, he was elected to the New South Wales Legislative Assembly in 1885 as the member for Illawarra, serving until 1887. He later served a second term from June to September 1891 before his election was voided. Lysaght died at Fairy Meadow in 1906.

New South Wales Legislative Assembly
Preceded by Alexander Stuart	Member for Illawarra; 1885–1887	Succeeded by Francis Woodward
Preceded by Francis Woodward; Joseph Mitchell	Member for Illawarra; 1891; Served alongside: John Nicholson	Succeeded by Archibald Campbell
