= John Nicholson (New South Wales politician) =

Australian politician

John Barnes Nicholson (1840 – 17 February 1919) was an English-born Australian politician.

He was born at Biglands in Cumbria to farmer John Nicholson and Mary Lightfoot. He worked as a coalminer from a young age, travelling widely to Vancouver and California before settling in New South Wales in 1882. He mined at Newcastle and then at Bulli, and was a local secretary of the Miners' Union. In February 1891 he married Ellen Brodie in Sydney; they had four children.

A foundation member of the Labour Party, he was one of the first group of Labour MLAs when he was elected to the New South Wales Legislative Assembly for Illawarra in 1891. He refused to take the pledge in 1893 and was elected to Woronora as an independent Labor member in 1894. He was a Free Trader briefly around 1898, but in 1904 rejoined the Labor Party. He transferred to the seat of Wollongong in 1904 and held it until 1917, when he was defeated after defecting to the Nationalist Party in the 1916 conscription split. Nicholson died in Woonona in 1919.

New South Wales Legislative Assembly
Preceded by Joseph Mitchell; Francis Woodward	Member for Illawarra; 1891–1894; Served alongside: Lysaght/Campbell	Succeeded by Archibald Campbell
New seat	Member for Woronora; 1894–1904	Abolished
New seat	Member for Wollongong; 1904–1917	Succeeded by Billy Davies
