= Archibald Campbell (Australian politician) =

Australian politician

Archibald Campbell (1834 – 14 December 1903) was a Scottish-born Australian politician.

He was born near Inverness to farmer Ewen Campbell and Margaret McLean. The family migrated to New South Wales in 1838. Campbell worked on the family farm at Gerringong, and in 1855 went to the Ballarat goldfields and then the Lachlan. He was part-owner of the Illawarra Mercury, and president of many local boards and societies. In 1891 he was elected to the New South Wales Legislative Assembly as the member for Illawarra. A Free Trader, he held the seat until his death in Wollongong in 1903. His brother Alexander was the member for neighbouring Kiama from 1894 to 1904.

New South Wales Legislative Assembly
| Preceded by Andrew Lysaght | Member for Illawarra; 1891–1903; Served alongside: John Nicholson; none | Succeeded by Edward Allen |
