= Electoral district of Illawarra =

Former state electoral district of New South Wales, Australia

Illawarra was an electoral district of the Legislative Assembly in the Australian state of New South Wales. It was located in the Illawarra area and originally created in 1859, replacing East Camden. It was replaced by Wollongong in 1904 and recreated in 1927. In 1968, it was abolished and partly replaced by Kembla. In 1971, Kembla was abolished and Illawarra was recreated. In 2007, it was abolished and replaced by Shellharbour.

== Members for Illawarra ==
Single-member (1859—1904)
Member	Party	Term			
John Hargrave	None	1859–1859			
Samuel Gordon	None	1859–1860			
Robert Haworth	None	1860–1864			
Patrick Osborne	None	1864–1866			
John Stewart	None	1866–1869			
James Osborne	None	1869–1872			
William Forster	None	1872–1874			
Samuel Gray	None	1874–1880			
Alexander Stuart	None	1880–1885			
Andrew Lysaght Sr.	None	1885–1887			
Francis Woodward	Free Trade	1887–1889			
Two members (1889—1894)
Member	Party	Term	Member	Party	Term
Francis Woodward	Free Trade	1889–1891	Joseph Mitchell	Free Trade	1889–1891
Andrew Lysaght Sr.	Protectionist	1891–1891	John Nicholson	Labor	1891–1894
Archibald Campbell	Free Trade	1891–1894	John Nicholson	Labor	1891–1894
Single-member (1894—1904)
Member	Party	Term			
Archibald Campbell	Free Trade	1894–1901			
Archibald Campbell	Liberal Reform	1901–1903			
Edward Allen	Liberal Reform	1904–1904			
Single-member (1927—1968)
Member	Party	Term			
Andrew Lysaght Jr.	Labor	1927–1930			
Billy Davies	Labor	1930–1941			
Howard Fowles	Labor	1941–1968			
Single-member (1971—2007)
Member	Party	Term			
George Petersen	Labor	1971–1987			
George Petersen	Illawarra Workers	1987–1988			
Terry Rumble	Labor	1988–1999			
Marianne Saliba	Labor	1999–2007			

== Election results ==
2003 New South Wales state election: Illawarra
Party	Candidate	Votes	%	±%
Labor	Marianne Saliba	23,270	55.7	+4.9
Liberal	Benjamin Caldwell	6,372	15.3	−0.9
Greens	Margaret Johanson	4,270	10.2	+5.6
Christian Democrats	Richard Harris	1,973	4.7	−2.2
Independent	Barry Hennessy	1,848	4.4	+4.4
Independent	Charles Mifsud	1,643	3.9	+3.9
One Nation	Robert Kennedy	1,149	2.8	−6.1
Against Further Immigration	John Cipov	588	1.4	−0.2
Independent	Bill Heycott	465	1.1	+1.1
Socialist Alliance	Chris Williams	187	0.4	+0.4
Total formal votes		41,765	96.3	−0.9
Informal votes		1,612	3.7	+0.9
Turnout		43,377	94.0	
Two-party-preferred result
Labor	Marianne Saliba	26,135	74.8	+2.0
Liberal	Benjamin Caldwell	8,808	25.2	−2.0
Labor hold		Swing	+2.0	
