= Results of the 1898 New South Wales colonial election =

Colonial election for New South Wales, Australia in July 1898

New South Wales colonial election, 27 July 1898 Legislative Assembly << 1895–1901 >>
Enrolled voters	301,989				
Votes cast	176,998		Turnout	58.61	−1.31
Informal votes	1,638		Informal	0.92	+0.04
Summary of votes by party
Party	Primary votes	%	Swing	Seats	Change
National Federal	76,161	43.03	+9.60	52	+10
Free Trade	58,214	32.89	−4.26	45	−13
Labour	21,556	12.18	−1.02	19	+1
Independent Federalist	12,443	7.03	+2.71	4	+2
Independent	5,290	2.99	−0.38	4	+4
Ind. Free Trade	3,325	1.88	−5.44	1	−3
Independent Labour	9	0.01	−1.21	0	−1
Total	176,998			125	

The 1898 New South Wales colonial election was for 125 electoral districts, with each district returning one member. The election was conducted on the basis of a simple majority or first-past-the-post voting system. In this election, in 21 electorates the winning candidate received less than 50% of the votes, while 3 were uncontested. The average number of enrolled voters per electorate was 2,416, ranging from The Shoalhaven (1,577) to Marrickville (3,516).

== Election results ==
=== Albury ===
1898 New South Wales colonial election: Albury
Party	Candidate	Votes	%	±%
National Federal	Thomas Griffith	834	51.2	
Free Trade	Richard Ball	795	48.8	
Total formal votes		1,629	98.3	
Informal votes		29	1.8	
Turnout		1,658	68.9	
National Federal gain from Free Trade				

=== Alma ===
1898 New South Wales colonial election: Alma
Party	Candidate	Votes	%	±%
Labour	Josiah Thomas	1,002	88.6	
National Federal	William Harding	126	11.1	
Independent	Charles Counsell	3	0.3	
Total formal votes		1,131	97.2	
Informal votes		33	2.8	
Turnout		1,164	45.4	
Labour hold				

=== Annandale ===
1898 New South Wales colonial election: Annandale
Party	Candidate	Votes	%	±%
Free Trade	William Mahony	901	52.7	
National Federal	Isaiah Cohen	810	47.3	
Total formal votes		1,711	99.7	
Informal votes		5	0.3	
Turnout		1,716	62.5	
Free Trade hold				

=== Argyle ===
1898 New South Wales colonial election: Argyle
Party	Candidate	Votes	%	±%
National Federal	Thomas Rose	768	55.2	
Free Trade	Francis Isaac	624	44.8	
Total formal votes		0	100.0	
Informal votes		0	0.0	
Turnout		0	0.0	
National Federal hold				

=== Armidale ===
1898 New South Wales colonial election: Armidale
Party	Candidate	Votes	%	±%
National Federal	Charles Wilson	1,020	56.3	
Free Trade	Edmund Lonsdale	792	43.7	
Total formal votes		0	100.0	
Informal votes		0	0.0	
Turnout		0	0.0	
National Federal gain from Free Trade				

=== Ashburnham ===
1898 New South Wales colonial election: Ashburnham
Party	Candidate	Votes	%	±%
National Federal	Joseph Reymond	1,092	58.2	
Free Trade	Albert Gardiner	783	41.8	
Total formal votes		1,875	99.1	
Informal votes		18	1.0	
Turnout		1,893	67.6	
National Federal hold				

=== Ashfield ===
1898 New South Wales colonial election: Ashfield
Party	Candidate	Votes	%	±%
National Federal	Bernhard Wise	966	50.1	
Free Trade	Thomas Bavister	961	49.9	
Total formal votes		1,927	99.6	
Informal votes		7	0.4	
Turnout		1,934	65.9	
National Federal gain from Free Trade				

=== Ballina ===
1898 New South Wales colonial election: Ballina
Party	Candidate	Votes	%	±%
National Federal	John Perry (b 1845)	610	57.7	
Independent Federalist	Thomas Temperley	447	42.3	
Total formal votes		1,057	99.1	
Informal votes		10	0.9	
Turnout		1,067	59.9	
National Federal hold				

=== Balmain North ===
1898 New South Wales colonial election: Balmain North
Party	Candidate	Votes	%	±%
Free Trade	Bill Wilks	965	51.6	
Independent Federalist	Alexander Milne	556	29.7	
National Federal	Leonard Green	350	18.7	
Total formal votes		1,871	99.4	
Informal votes		11	0.6	
Turnout		1,882	62.1	
Free Trade hold				

=== Balmain South ===
1898 New South Wales colonial election: Balmain South
Party	Candidate	Votes	%	±%
Labour	Sydney Law	979	47.0	
National Federal	William Traill	861	41.3	
Independent Federalist	Gilbert Murdoch	174	8.4	
Independent	Charles Taylor	70	3.4	
Total formal votes		2,084	99.5	
Informal votes		10	0.5	
Turnout		2,094	64.9	
Labour hold				

=== The Barwon ===
1898 New South Wales colonial election: The Barwon
Party	Candidate	Votes	%	±%
National Federal	William Willis	905	57.9	
Labour	Donald Macdonell	659	42.1	
Total formal votes		1,564	98.7	
Informal votes		20	1.3	
Turnout		1,584	55.4	
National Federal hold				

=== Bathurst ===
1898 New South Wales colonial election: Bathurst
Party	Candidate	Votes	%	±%
National Federal	Francis Suttor	995	52.7	
Free Trade	Sydney Smith	892	47.3	
Total formal votes		1,887	99.3	
Informal votes		14	0.7	
Turnout		1,901	73.3	
National Federal gain from Free Trade				

=== Bega ===
1898 New South Wales colonial election: Bega
Party	Candidate	Votes	%	±%
National Federal	Henry Clarke	753	57.2	
Independent Federalist	William Boot	555	42.2	
Independent Federalist	William Braine	8	0.6	
Total formal votes		1,316	98.7	
Informal votes		18	1.4	
Turnout		1,334	61.9	
Member changed to National Federal from Ind. Protectionist				

=== Bingara ===
1898 New South Wales colonial election: Bingara
Party	Candidate	Votes	%	±%
Free Trade	Samuel Moore	696	57.6	
National Federal	William McIntyre	513	42.4	
Total formal votes		1,209	99.2	
Informal votes		10	0.8	
Turnout		1,219	51.7	
Free Trade hold				

=== Boorowa ===
1898 New South Wales colonial election: Boorowa
Party	Candidate	Votes	%	±%
National Federal	Kenneth Mackay	783	62.2	
Labour	James Toomey	475	37.8	
Total formal votes		1,258	98.7	
Informal votes		17	1.3	
Turnout		1,275	61.0	
National Federal hold				

=== Botany ===
1898 New South Wales colonial election: Botany
Party	Candidate	Votes	%	±%
Labour	John Dacey	568	31.5	
Ind. Free Trade	William Stephen	521	28.9	
National Federal	Charles Swinbourne	465	25.8	
Independent Federalist	James Macfadyen	206	11.4	
Independent Federalist	William Wall	42	2.3	
Total formal votes		1,802	99.0	
Informal votes		19	1.0	
Turnout		1,821	67.5	
Labour hold				

=== Bourke ===
1898 New South Wales colonial election: Bourke
Party	Candidate	Votes	%	±%
National Federal	William Davis (elected)	526	50.4	
Free Trade	Edward Millen (defeated)	517	49.6	
Total formal votes		1,043	99.1	
Informal votes		10	1.0	
Turnout		1,053	45.8	
National Federal gain from Free Trade				

=== Bowral ===
1898 New South Wales colonial election: Bowral
Party	Candidate	Votes	%	±%
Free Trade	William McCourt	753	75.7	
National Federal	F N Yarwood	242	24.3	
Total formal votes		995	99.3	
Informal votes		7	0.7	
Turnout		1,002	53.8	
Free Trade hold				

=== Braidwood ===
1898 New South Wales colonial election: Braidwood
Party	Candidate	Votes	%	±%
National Federal	Austin Chapman	833	73.1	
Free Trade	Charles Beale	307	26.9	
Total formal votes		1,140	99.0	
Informal votes		12	1.0	
Turnout		1,152	52.4	
National Federal hold				

=== Broken Hill ===
1898 New South Wales colonial election: Broken Hill
Party	Candidate	Votes	%	±%
Labour	John Cann	1,125	86.1	
National Federal	Alexander Hendry	182	13.9	
Total formal votes		1,307	96.0	
Informal votes		54	4.0	
Turnout		1,361	45.7	
Labour hold				

=== Burwood ===
1898 New South Wales colonial election: Burwood
Party	Candidate	Votes	%	±%
Ind. Free Trade	William Archer	700	48.7	
National Federal	William McMillan	647	45.0	
Ind. Free Trade	James Eve	90	6.3	
Total formal votes		1,437	99.5	
Informal votes		8	0.6	
Turnout		1,445	62.5	
Ind. Free Trade gain from Free Trade				

William McMillan had been elected as a Free Trade member, but changed to National Federal for this election.

=== Camden ===
1898 New South Wales colonial election: Camden
Party	Candidate	Votes	%	±%
National Federal	John Kidd	1,020	57.6	
Free Trade	Charles Bull	637	36.0	
Independent	Henry Willis	113	6.4	
Total formal votes		1,770	99.6	
Informal votes		8	0.5	
Turnout		1,778	68.5	
National Federal gain from Free Trade				

=== Canterbury ===
1898 New South Wales colonial election: Canterbury
Party	Candidate	Votes	%	±%
Free Trade	Varney Parkes	1,083	65.8	
National Federal	Thomas Bavin	532	32.3	
Independent Federalist	George Rundle	30	1.8	
Total formal votes		1,645	99.0	
Informal votes		16	1.0	
Turnout		1,661	54.4	
Free Trade hold				

=== The Clarence ===
1898 New South Wales colonial election: The Clarence
Party	Candidate	Votes	%	±%
National Federal	John McFarlane	unopposed		
National Federal hold				

=== Cobar ===
1898 New South Wales colonial election: Cobar
Party	Candidate	Votes	%	±%
Labour	William Spence	777	50.1	
National Federal	Michael O'Halloran	396	25.5	
Independent Federalist	Richard Machattie	339	21.9	
Independent	Samuel Wood	39	2.5	
Total formal votes		1,551	98.0	
Informal votes		31	2.0	
Turnout		1,582	52.0	
Labour gain from National Federal				

The sitting member Thomas Waddell (National Federal) successfully contested Cowra.

=== Condoublin ===
1898 New South Wales colonial election: Condoublin
Party	Candidate	Votes	%	±%
Labour	Thomas Brown	754	54.5	
National Federal	Andrew Stewart	630	45.5	
Total formal votes		1,384	99.3	
Informal votes		10	0.7	
Turnout		1,394	54.6	
Labour hold				

=== Coonamble ===
1898 New South Wales colonial election: Coonamble
Party	Candidate	Votes	%	±%
Labour	Hugh Macdonald	780	55.5	
National Federal	William Alison	625	44.5	
Total formal votes		1,405	99.3	
Informal votes		10	0.7	
Turnout		1,415	55.2	
Labour hold				

=== Cowra ===
1898 New South Wales colonial election: Cowra
Party	Candidate	Votes	%	±%
National Federal	Thomas Waddell	830	58.8	
Labour	Hector Lamond	581	41.2	
Total formal votes		1,411	99.3	
Informal votes		10	0.7	
Turnout		1,421	61.0	
National Federal hold				

=== Darlington ===
1898 New South Wales colonial election: Darlington
Party	Candidate	Votes	%	±%
Free Trade	Thomas Clarke	966	50.6	
National Federal	William Schey	874	45.8	
Ind. Free Trade	William Hall	58	3.0	
Independent Federalist	Michael Keating	8	0.4	
Independent	James Jones	3	0.2	
Total formal votes		1,909	99.4	
Informal votes		11	0.6	
Turnout		1,920	60.9	
Free Trade gain from National Federal				

=== Deniliquin ===
1898 New South Wales colonial election: Deniliquin
Party	Candidate	Votes	%	±%
National Federal	John Chanter	958	75.5	
Independent	George Berryman	311	24.5	
Total formal votes		1,269	99.2	
Informal votes		10	0.8	
Turnout		1,279	53.9	
National Federal hold				

=== Dubbo ===
1898 New South Wales colonial election: Dubbo
Party	Candidate	Votes	%	±%
Free Trade	Simeon Phillips	925	56.7	
National Federal	James Morgan	707	43.3	
Total formal votes		1,632	99.9	
Informal votes		2	0.1	
Turnout		1,634	66.1	
Free Trade hold				

=== Durham ===
1898 New South Wales colonial election: Durham
Party	Candidate	Votes	%	±%
Independent Federalist	Walter Bennett	929	53.1	
National Federal	Herbert Brown	820	46.9	
Total formal votes		1,749	98.8	
Informal votes		21	1.2	
Turnout		1,770	76.6	
Independent Federalist gain from National Federal				

=== East Maitland ===
1898 New South Wales colonial election: East Maitland
Party	Candidate	Votes	%	±%
Free Trade	James Brunker	705	52.0	
National Federal	Samuel Clift	650	48.0	
Total formal votes		1,355	99.0	
Informal votes		14	1.0	
Turnout		1,369	70.1	
Free Trade hold				

=== Eden-Bombala ===
1898 New South Wales colonial election: Eden-Bombala
Party	Candidate	Votes	%	±%
National Federal	William Wood	777	56.9	
Independent Federalist	Henry Dawson	559	40.9	
Independent Federalist	Samuel Woods	30	2.2	
Total formal votes		1,366	98.0	
Informal votes		28	2.0	
Turnout		1,394	67.6	
National Federal hold				

=== Glebe ===
1898 New South Wales colonial election: Glebe
Party	Candidate	Votes	%	±%
Free Trade	James Hogue	1,021	57.9	
National Federal	Bruce Smith	742	42.1	
Total formal votes		1,763	99.3	
Informal votes		12	0.7	
Turnout		1,775	61.0	
Free Trade hold				

=== Glen Innes ===
1898 New South Wales colonial election: Glen Innes
Party	Candidate	Votes	%	±%
National Federal	Francis Wright	520	49.4	
Independent	Thomas Chandler	455	43.3	
Independent	John Wetherspoon	77	7.3	
Total formal votes		1,052	99.3	
Informal votes		8	0.8	
Turnout		1,060	55.2	
National Federal hold				

=== Gloucester ===
1898 New South Wales colonial election: Gloucester
Party	Candidate	Votes	%	±%
National Federal	Richard Price	859	63.9	
Free Trade	Frederick Hooke	486	36.1	
Total formal votes		1,345	99.6	
Informal votes		6	0.4	
Turnout		1,351	60.7	
National Federal hold				

=== Goulburn ===
1898 New South Wales colonial election: Goulburn
Party	Candidate	Votes	%	±%
Free Trade	James Ashton	842	62.3	
National Federal	Arthur Barrett	509	37.7	
Total formal votes		1,351	99.7	
Informal votes		4	0.3	
Turnout		1,355	62.3	
Free Trade hold				

=== Grafton ===
1898 New South Wales colonial election: Grafton
Party	Candidate	Votes	%	±%
National Federal	John See	898	62.5	
Independent Federalist	Frederick McGuren	539	37.5	
Total formal votes		1,437	99.5	
Informal votes		7	0.5	
Turnout		1,444	66.1	
National Federal hold				

=== Granville ===
1898 New South Wales colonial election: Granville
Party	Candidate	Votes	%	±%
Free Trade	John Nobbs	994	63.0	
National Federal	William Windsor	333	21.1	
Labour	Charles Dyer	252	16.0	
Total formal votes		1,579	99.5	
Informal votes		8	0.5	
Turnout		1,587	65.9	
Free Trade gain from Labour				

=== Grenfell ===
1898 New South Wales colonial election: Grenfell
Party	Candidate	Votes	%	±%
Labour	William Holman	1,115	55.6	
National Federal	Andrew Kelly	892	44.4	
Total formal votes		2,007	99.6	
Informal votes		8	0.4	
Turnout		2,015	57.5	
Labour gain from Ind. Free Trade				

=== Gundagai ===
1898 New South Wales colonial election: Gundagai
Party	Candidate	Votes	%	±%
National Federal	John Barnes	591	39.7	
Independent Federalist	John Miller	511	34.3	
Independent Federalist	Waldo Sibthorpe	316	21.2	
Labour	William Matchett	70	4.7	
Total formal votes		1,488	98.1	
Informal votes		29	1.9	
Turnout		1,517	63.5	
National Federal hold				

=== Gunnedah ===
1898 New South Wales colonial election: Gunnedah
Party	Candidate	Votes	%	±%
National Federal	Thomas Goodwin	631	62.5	
Free Trade	John Kirkpatrick	256	25.4	
Independent Federalist	William Case	123	12.2	
Total formal votes		1,010	98.7	
Informal votes		13	1.3	
Turnout		1,023	49.0	
National Federal hold				

=== Hartley ===
1898 New South Wales colonial election: Hartley
Party	Candidate	Votes	%	±%
Free Trade	Joseph Cook	788	70.4	
National Federal	John Tabrett	332	29.6	
Total formal votes		1,120	98.7	
Informal votes		15	1.3	
Turnout		1,135	52.4	
Free Trade hold				

=== The Hastings and The Macleay ===
1898 New South Wales colonial election: The Hastings and The Macleay
Party	Candidate	Votes	%	±%
National Federal	Francis Clarke	unopposed		
National Federal hold				

=== The Hawkesbury ===
1898 New South Wales colonial election: The Hawkesbury
Party	Candidate	Votes	%	±%
Free Trade	William Morgan	978	48.8	
Independent Federalist	Brinsley Hall	913	45.6	
National Federal	John Paine	81	4.0	
Independent Federalist	William Dean	32	1.6	
Total formal votes		2,004	98.8	
Informal votes		24	1.2	
Turnout		2,028	72.9	
Free Trade hold				

=== Hay ===
1898 New South Wales colonial election: Hay
Party	Candidate	Votes	%	±%
Free Trade	Frank Byrne	520	53.0	
National Federal	James Newton	249	25.4	
Independent Federalist	Allen Lakeman	212	21.6	
Total formal votes		981	99.2	
Informal votes		8	0.8	
Turnout		989	48.2	
Free Trade hold				

=== The Hume ===
1898 New South Wales colonial election: The Hume
Party	Candidate	Votes	%	±%
National Federal	William Lyne	718	74.2	
Free Trade	William Wiesner	250	25.8	
Total formal votes		968	98.4	
Informal votes		16	1.6	
Turnout		984	47.2	
National Federal hold				

=== Illawarra ===
1898 New South Wales colonial election: Illawarra
Party	Candidate	Votes	%	±%
Free Trade	Archibald Campbell	809	65.4	
National Federal	Thomas Kennedy	429	34.7	
Total formal votes		1,238	99.5	
Informal votes		6	0.5	
Turnout		1,244	60.4	
Free Trade hold				

=== Inverell ===
1898 New South Wales colonial election: Inverell
Party	Candidate	Votes	%	±%
National Federal	George Cruickshank	567	92.7	
Independent	Thomas Jones	45	7.4	
Total formal votes		612	98.7	
Informal votes		8	1.3	
Turnout		620	33.5	
National Federal hold				

=== Kahibah ===
1898 New South Wales colonial election: Kahibah
Party	Candidate	Votes	%	±%
Labour	Alfred Edden	843	65.0	
Independent Federalist	William Richardson	38	2.9	
National Federal	Oswald Steel	356	27.5	
Independent	William Williams	60	4.6	
Total formal votes		1,297	99.2	
Informal votes		11	0.8	
Turnout		1,308	59.1	
Labour hold				

=== Kiama ===
1898 New South Wales colonial election: Kiama
Party	Candidate	Votes	%	±%
National Federal	Alexander Campbell	707	51.5	
Free Trade	George Fuller	665	48.5	
Total formal votes		1,372	99.9	
Informal votes		2	0.2	
Turnout		1,374	68.7	
National Federal hold				

=== The Lachlan ===
1898 New South Wales colonial election: The Lachlan
Party	Candidate	Votes	%	±%
National Federal	James Carroll	558	62.9	
Independent Federalist	Alexander Cameron	323	36.4	
Ind. Free Trade	C N Broome	6	0.7	
Total formal votes		887	99.2	
Informal votes		7	0.8	
Turnout		894	46.2	
National Federal hold				

=== Leichhardt ===
1898 New South Wales colonial election: Leichhardt
Party	Candidate	Votes	%	±%
Free Trade	John Hawthorne	960	48.8	
National Federal	Richard Colonna-Close	530	26.9	
Labour	George Clark	478	24.3	
Total formal votes		1,968	99.8	
Informal votes		4	0.2	
Turnout		1,972	64.1	
Free Trade hold				

=== Lismore ===
1898 New South Wales colonial election: Lismore
Party	Candidate	Votes	%	±%
National Federal	Thomas Ewing	591	84.9	
Independent Federalist	James Walker	105	15.1	
Total formal votes		696	99.7	
Informal votes		2	0.3	
Turnout		698	44.3	
National Federal hold				

=== Macquarie ===
1898 New South Wales colonial election: Macquarie
Party	Candidate	Votes	%	±%
National Federal	William Hurley	724	55.1	
Free Trade	Robert Thompson	478	36.4	
Independent	Francis Foster	96	7.3	
Independent	David Todd	8	0.6	
Ind. Free Trade	William Paul	6	0.5	
Ind. Free Trade	Allen Carmichael	2	0.2	
Total formal votes		1,314	97.9	
Informal votes		28	2.1	
Turnout		1,342	56.3	
National Federal hold				

=== The Manning ===
1898 New South Wales colonial election: The Manning
Party	Candidate	Votes	%	±%
Free Trade	James Young	933	58.6	
National Federal	David Cowan	658	41.4	
Total formal votes		1,591	99.4	
Informal votes		9	0.6	
Turnout		1,600	74.6	
Free Trade hold				

=== Marrickville ===
1898 New South Wales colonial election: Marrickville
Party	Candidate	Votes	%	±%
Free Trade	Francis McLean	1,258	55.6	
National Federal	David Chenhall	791	34.9	
Ind. Free Trade	Elliot Johnson	153	6.8	
Independent Federalist	William Clarke	53	2.3	
Independent	William Webster	9	0.4	
Total formal votes		2,264	99.7	
Informal votes		8	0.4	
Turnout		2,272	64.6	
Free Trade hold				

=== Molong ===
1898 New South Wales colonial election: Molong
Party	Candidate	Votes	%	±%
National Federal	Andrew Ross	558	44.7	
Free Trade	Harrington McCulloch	389	31.1	
Independent Federalist	William Shield	302	24.2	
Total formal votes		1,249	99.2	
Informal votes		10	0.8	
Turnout		1,259	61.6	
National Federal hold				

=== Manaro ===
1898 New South Wales colonial election: Manaro
Party	Candidate	Votes	%	±%
National Federal	Gus Miller	694	62.6	
Ind. Free Trade	Granville Ryrie	402	36.3	
Independent	Hugh MacDonnell	13	1.2	
Total formal votes		1,109	97.4	
Informal votes		30	2.6	
Turnout		1,139	50.6	
National Federal hold				

=== Moree ===
1898 New South Wales colonial election: Moree
Party	Candidate	Votes	%	±%
National Federal	Thomas Hassall	675	69.4	
Free Trade	Henry Joseph	297	30.6	
Total formal votes		972	99.4	
Informal votes		6	0.6	
Turnout		978	49.6	
National Federal hold				

=== Moruya ===
1898 New South Wales colonial election: Moruya
Party	Candidate	Votes	%	±%
Free Trade	William Millard	812	53.0	
National Federal	Albert Chapman	709	46.3	
Independent	John Brogan	10	0.7	
Total formal votes		1,531	99.1	
Informal votes		14	0.9	
Turnout		1,545	72.8	
Free Trade hold				

=== Mudgee ===
1898 New South Wales colonial election: Mudgee
Party	Candidate	Votes	%	±%
National Federal	Edwin Richards	1,065	50.1	
Free Trade	Robert Jones	1,059	49.9	
Total formal votes		2,124	99.1	
Informal votes		20	0.9	
Turnout		2,144	68.1	
National Federal gain from Free Trade				

=== The Murray ===
1898 New South Wales colonial election: The Murray
Party	Candidate	Votes	%	±%
National Federal	James Hayes	unopposed		
National Federal hold				

=== The Murrumbidgee ===
1898 New South Wales colonial election: The Murrumbidgee
Party	Candidate	Votes	%	±%
National Federal	Thomas Fitzpatrick	1,078	69.4	
Labour	Arthur Rae	475	30.6	
Total formal votes		1,553	99.1	
Informal votes		14	0.9	
Turnout		1,567	60.8	
National Federal hold				

=== Narrabri ===
1898 New South Wales colonial election: Narrabri
Party	Candidate	Votes	%	±%
Labour	Hugh Ross	608	40.7	
National Federal	George Dale	522	34.9	
Independent Federalist	William Borthwick	365	24.4	
Total formal votes		1,495	98.3	
Informal votes		26	1.7	
Turnout		1,521	58.6	
Labour gain from Free Trade				

The sitting member Charles Collins (Free Trade) died in 1898 and Hugh Ross (Labour) had won the seat in a by-election.

=== The Nepean ===
1898 New South Wales colonial election: The Nepean
Party	Candidate	Votes	%	±%
Free Trade	Samuel Lees	744	48.0	
National Federal	Thomas Smith	656	42.3	
Ind. Free Trade	Alfred Reid	151	9.7	
Total formal votes		1,551	98.9	
Informal votes		18	1.2	
Turnout		1,569	68.8	
Free Trade gain from National Federal				

=== Newcastle East ===
1898 New South Wales colonial election: Newcastle East
Party	Candidate	Votes	%	±%
Free Trade	William Dick	845	60.2	
National Federal	Jefferson Hester	556	39.6	
Independent	Robert Huntly	3	0.2	
Total formal votes		1,404	98.3	
Informal votes		25	1.8	
Turnout		1,429	65.3	
Free Trade hold				

=== Newcastle West ===
1898 New South Wales colonial election: Newcastle West
Party	Candidate	Votes	%	±%
Labour	James Thomson	580	53.6	
National Federal	James Ellis	502	46.4	
Total formal votes		1,082	99.8	
Informal votes		2	0.2	
Turnout		1,084	63.3	
Labour hold				

=== Newtown-Camperdown ===
1898 New South Wales colonial election: Newtown-Camperdown
Party	Candidate	Votes	%	±%
Free Trade	Francis Cotton	471	27.2	
Independent Federalist	James Smith	431	24.9	
Independent Federalist	George Spark	374	21.6	
National Federal	James Abigail	350	20.2	
Labour	Edward Riley	91	5.3	
Independent Federalist	Thomas Evans	9	0.5	
Independent	Mikael Dunn	3	0.2	
Total formal votes		1,729	98.5	
Informal votes		27	1.5	
Turnout		1,756	61.8	
Free Trade hold				

=== Newtown-Erskine ===
1898 New South Wales colonial election: Newtown-Erskine
Party	Candidate	Votes	%	±%
Free Trade	Edmund Molesworth	860	61.3	
National Federal	Harold Morgan	542	38.7	
Total formal votes		1,402	99.8	
Informal votes		3	0.2	
Turnout		1,405	59.7	
Free Trade hold				

=== Newtown-St Peters ===
1898 New South Wales colonial election: Newtown-St Peters
Party	Candidate	Votes	%	±%
Free Trade	William Rigg	1,031	61.3	
National Federal	George Edwards	628	37.3	
Independent	William Sherley	12	0.7	
Independent Federalist	James Mitchell	7	0.4	
Independent Federalist	Ernest Dent	5	0.3	
Independent Federalist	George, St George	0	0.0	
Total formal votes		1,683	98.9	
Informal votes		19	1.1	
Turnout		1,702	63.3	
Free Trade hold				

=== Northumberland ===
1898 New South Wales colonial election: Northumberland
Party	Candidate	Votes	%	±%
National Federal	Richard Stevenson	823	52.8	
Free Trade	Henry Wheeler	735	47.2	
Total formal votes		1,558	99.2	
Informal votes		12	0.8	
Turnout		1,570	66.9	
National Federal gain from Free Trade				

=== Orange ===
1898 New South Wales colonial election: Orange
Party	Candidate	Votes	%	±%
Free Trade	Harry Newman	1,163	53.9	
National Federal	James Dalton	995	46.1	
Total formal votes		2,158	99.1	
Informal votes		19	0.9	
Turnout		2,177	70.2	
Free Trade hold				

=== Paddington ===
1898 New South Wales colonial election: Paddington
Party	Candidate	Votes	%	±%
Free Trade	John Neild	973	53.0	
National Federal	Thomas West	848	46.2	
Ind. Free Trade	Arthur Fletcher	15	0.8	
Total formal votes		1,836	98.6	
Informal votes		27	1.5	
Turnout		1,863	61.5	
Member changed to Free Trade from Ind. Free Trade				

=== Parramatta ===
1898 New South Wales colonial election: Parramatta
Party	Candidate	Votes	%	±%
Independent Federalist	William Ferris	747	44.8	
Free Trade	Dowell O'Reilly	743	44.6	
National Federal	Edwin Brown	168	10.1	
Independent Federalist	Joseph Withers	9	0.5	
Total formal votes		1,667	99.3	
Informal votes		12	0.7	
Turnout		1,679	70.2	
Independent Federalist gain from Free Trade				

=== Petersham ===
1898 New South Wales colonial election: Petersham
Party	Candidate	Votes	%	±%
National Federal	John Cohen	674	37.0	
Free Trade	Llewellyn Jones	626	34.3	
Ind. Free Trade	Percy Hordern	524	28.7	
Total formal votes		1,824	99.8	
Informal votes		3	0.2	
Turnout		1,827	68.4	
National Federal gain from Free Trade				

=== Queanbeyan ===
1898 New South Wales colonial election: Queanbeyan
Party	Candidate	Votes	%	±%
National Federal	Edward O'Sullivan	694	54.0	
Free Trade	Alfred Allen	562	43.7	
Independent	Percy Hodgkinson	20	1.6	
Independent	John Harper	10	0.8	
Total formal votes		1,286	98.9	
Informal votes		14	1.1	
Turnout		1,300	69.9	
National Federal hold				

=== Quirindi ===
1898 New South Wales colonial election: Quirindi
Party	Candidate	Votes	%	±%
Independent	Robert Levien	645	53.8	
Labour	John Perry (b 1849)	532	44.4	
National Federal	William Clapin	22	1.8	
Total formal votes		1,199	99.3	
Informal votes		8	0.7	
Turnout		1,207	62.8	
Member changed to Independent from National Federal				

=== Raleigh ===
1898 New South Wales colonial election: Raleigh
Party	Candidate	Votes	%	±%
Independent	John McLaughlin	814	61.8	
National Federal	Patrick Hogan	504	38.2	
Total formal votes		1,318	99.3	
Informal votes		9	0.7	
Turnout		1,327	62.9	
Member changed to Independent from Ind. Protectionist				

=== Randwick ===
1898 New South Wales colonial election: Randwick
Party	Candidate	Votes	%	±%
Free Trade	David Storey	865	51.0	
National Federal	George Raffan	831	49.0	
Total formal votes		1,696	99.7	
Informal votes		5	0.3	
Turnout		1,701	60.9	
Free Trade hold				

=== Redfern ===
1898 New South Wales colonial election: Redfern
Party	Candidate	Votes	%	±%
Labour	James McGowen	916	55.2	
National Federal	William Cameron	726	43.7	
Independent Federalist	Joseph Butterfield	13	0.8	
Independent	William Hunter	6	0.4	
Total formal votes		1,661	99.2	
Informal votes		13	0.8	
Turnout		1,674	56.7	
Labour hold				

=== The Richmond ===
1898 New South Wales colonial election: The Richmond
Party	Candidate	Votes	%	±%
National Federal	Robert Pyers	665	79.2	
Ind. Free Trade	John Willard	175	20.8	
Total formal votes		840	98.8	
Informal votes		10	1.2	
Turnout		850	49.3	
National Federal hold				

=== Robertson ===
1898 New South Wales colonial election: Robertson
Party	Candidate	Votes	%	±%
National Federal	Robert Fitzgerald	1,055	61.7	
Free Trade	Thomas Houghton	656	38.3	
Total formal votes		1,711	98.5	
Informal votes		27	1.6	
Turnout		1,738	61.8	
National Federal hold				

=== Ryde ===
1898 New South Wales colonial election: Ryde
Party	Candidate	Votes	%	±%
Independent Federalist	Edward Terry	919	50.3	
Free Trade	Frank Farnell	787	43.1	
Ind. Free Trade	Edward Foxall	121	6.6	
Total formal votes		1,827	99.5	
Informal votes		10	0.5	
Turnout		1,837	69.1	
Independent Federalist gain from Free Trade				

=== Rylstone ===
1898 New South Wales colonial election: Rylstone
Party	Candidate	Votes	%	±%
Free Trade	John Fitzpatrick	753	54.2	
National Federal	Jack FitzGerald	636	45.8	
Total formal votes		1,389	99.3	
Informal votes		10	0.7	
Turnout		1,399	65.0	
Free Trade hold				

=== St George ===
1898 New South Wales colonial election: St George
Party	Candidate	Votes	%	±%
Free Trade	Joseph Carruthers	1,522	71.8	
National Federal	George Waddell	594	28.0	
Independent	Francis Brown	4	0.2	
Total formal votes		2,120	99.3	
Informal votes		16	0.8	
Turnout		2,136	64.8	
Free Trade hold				

=== St Leonards ===
1898 New South Wales colonial election: St Leonards
Party	Candidate	Votes	%	±%
Free Trade	Edward Clark	1,080	63.5	
National Federal	Fountain Winter	421	24.8	
Independent Federalist	Andrew Eaton	190	11.2	
Independent Federalist	Robert Moodie	9	0.5	
Total formal votes		1,700	99.0	
Informal votes		17	1.0	
Turnout		1,717	57.5	
Free Trade hold				

=== Sherbrooke ===
1898 New South Wales colonial election: Sherbrooke
Party	Candidate	Votes	%	±%
National Federal	Broughton O'Conor	603	49.5	
Free Trade	Jacob Garrard (defeated)	582	47.8	
Independent	James Purser	33	2.7	
Total formal votes		1,218	99.3	
Informal votes		9	0.7	
Turnout		1,227	61.7	
National Federal gain from Free Trade				

=== The Shoalhaven ===
1898 New South Wales colonial election: The Shoalhaven
Party	Candidate	Votes	%	±%
Independent Federalist	David Davis	882	55.9	
National Federal	Philip Morton	695	44.1	
Total formal votes		1,577	99.6	
Informal votes		7	0.4	
Turnout		1,584	70.9	
Independent Federalist gain from Ind. Free Trade				

Philip Morton had been elected as an Independent Free Trader but changed to National Federal.

=== Singleton ===
1898 New South Wales colonial election: Singleton
Party	Candidate	Votes	%	±%
National Federal	Charles Dight	878	56.1	
Free Trade	Albert Gould	687	43.9	
Total formal votes		1,565	99.5	
Informal votes		8	0.5	
Turnout		1,573	64.0	
National Federal gain from Free Trade				

=== Sturt ===
1898 New South Wales colonial election: Sturt
Party	Candidate	Votes	%	±%
Labour	William Ferguson	655	86.5	
National Federal	Thomas Walker	92	12.2	
Independent	Alexander Hendry	10	1.3	
Total formal votes		757	99.0	
Informal votes		8	1.1	
Turnout		765	37.0	
Labour hold				

=== Sydney-Belmore ===
1898 New South Wales colonial election: Sydney-Belmore
Party	Candidate	Votes	%	±%
Free Trade	James Graham	582	49.7	
National Federal	Henry Hoyle	394	33.7	
Independent Federalist	Joseph Carlos	150	12.8	
Independent	Henry Foran	45	3.8	
Total formal votes		1,171	99.4	
Informal votes		7	0.6	
Turnout		1,178	52.1	
Free Trade hold				

=== Sydney-Bligh ===
1898 New South Wales colonial election: Sydney-Bligh
Party	Candidate	Votes	%	±%
National Federal	Patrick Quinn	642	54.5	
Free Trade	James Harvey	518	44.0	
Independent	William McNamara	18	1.5	
Total formal votes		1,178	98.8	
Informal votes		14	1.2	
Turnout		1,192	53.5	
National Federal gain from Free Trade				

=== Sydney-Cook ===
1898 New South Wales colonial election: Sydney-Cook
Party	Candidate	Votes	%	±%
Free Trade	Samuel Whiddon	593	52.2	
National Federal	George Lewis	524	46.1	
Independent	Daniel Healey	17	1.5	
Independent	Suleman Amein	3	0.3	
Total formal votes		1,137	99.4	
Informal votes		7	0.6	
Turnout		1,144	57.1	
Free Trade hold				

=== Sydney-Denison ===
1898 New South Wales colonial election: Sydney-Denison
Party	Candidate	Votes	%	±%
Free Trade	Matthew Harris	604	60.4	
National Federal	William Henson	376	37.6	
Independent	Alexander Hutchison	16	1.6	
Independent	Thomas O'Reilly	4	0.4	
Total formal votes		1,000	98.8	
Informal votes		12	1.2	
Turnout		1,012	52.6	
Free Trade hold				

=== Sydney-Fitzroy ===
1898 New South Wales colonial election: Sydney-Fitzroy
Party	Candidate	Votes	%	±%
Free Trade	Henry Chapman	815	51.2	
National Federal	John Norton	767	48.2	
Independent Federalist	Percy Tighe	5	0.3	
Ind. Free Trade	Daniel Levy	3	0.2	
Independent Federalist	Patrick Dorahy	1	0.1	
Total formal votes		1,591	99.1	
Informal votes		15	0.9	
Turnout		1,606	59.2	
Free Trade gain from Ind. Free Trade				

John McElhone (Independent Free Trade) died in 1898 and John Norton (National Federal) had won the seat in a by-election.

=== Sydney-Flinders ===
1898 New South Wales colonial election: Sydney-Flinders
Party	Candidate	Votes	%	±%
National Federal	Arthur Nelson	543	48.2	
Free Trade	John Dobbie	428	38.0	
Independent Federalist	Ernest Gardner	102	9.1	
Labour	Robert Cropley	54	4.8	
Independent	William Gocher	0	0.0	
Total formal votes		1,127	99.0	
Informal votes		12	1.1	
Turnout		1,139	52.4	
National Federal hold				

=== Sydney-Gipps ===
1898 New South Wales colonial election: Sydney-Gipps
Party	Candidate	Votes	%	±%
National Federal	Wilfred Spruson	747	50.4	
Labour	George Black	727	49.0	
Independent Labor	Thomas Kohen	9	0.6	
Total formal votes		1,483	99.3	
Informal votes		11	0.7	
Turnout		1,494	59.6	
National Federal gain from Labour				

=== Sydney-King ===
1898 New South Wales colonial election: Sydney-King
Party	Candidate	Votes	%	±%
Free Trade	George Reid	761	53.6	
National Federal	Edmund Barton	651	45.9	
Independent	Robert Reid	8	0.6	
Total formal votes		1,420	99.3	
Informal votes		10	0.7	
Turnout		1,430	54.0	
Free Trade hold				

=== Sydney-Lang ===
1898 New South Wales colonial election: Sydney-Lang
Party	Candidate	Votes	%	±%
Labour	Billy Hughes	544	53.6	
National Federal	Joseph Chuck	297	29.3	
Independent	John Strachan	164	16.2	
Independent Federalist	David Fealy	10	1.0	
Total formal votes		1,015	98.8	
Informal votes		12	1.2	
Turnout		1,027	47.5	
Labour hold				

=== Sydney-Phillip ===
1898 New South Wales colonial election: Sydney-Phillip
Party	Candidate	Votes	%	±%
National Federal	Henry Copeland	721	57.5	
Free Trade	Robert Hollis	430	34.3	
Ind. Free Trade	Ralph Hodgson	103	8.2	
Total formal votes		1,254	99.3	
Informal votes		9	0.7	
Turnout		1,263	51.2	
National Federal hold				

=== Sydney-Pyrmont ===
1898 New South Wales colonial election: Sydney-Pyrmont
Party	Candidate	Votes	%	±%
Labour	Samuel Smith	616	52.8	
National Federal	Daniel O'Connor	383	32.8	
Independent	John Carter	152	13.0	
Ind. Free Trade	Frederick Marshall	16	1.4	
Total formal votes		1,167	99.2	
Informal votes		10	0.9	
Turnout		1,177	58.7	
Labour hold				

=== Tamworth ===
1898 New South Wales colonial election: Tamworth
Party	Candidate	Votes	%	±%
National Federal	William Sawers	674	51.2	
Free Trade	Albert Piddington	642	48.8	
Total formal votes		1,316	98.7	
Informal votes		17	1.3	
Turnout		1,333	65.3	
National Federal gain from Free Trade				

=== Tenterfield ===
1898 New South Wales colonial election: Tenterfield
Party	Candidate	Votes	%	±%
Free Trade	Charles Lee	704	53.1	
National Federal	John Reid	622	46.9	
Total formal votes		1,326	98.7	
Informal votes		17	1.3	
Turnout		1,343	74.0	
Free Trade hold				

=== Tumut ===
1898 New South Wales colonial election: Tumut
Party	Candidate	Votes	%	±%
Independent	Robert Donaldson	530	33.7	
Labour	Robert Joyce	503	32.0	
National Federal	Travers Jones	222	14.1	
Independent Federalist	John Keenan	179	11.4	
Independent Federalist	Daniel O'Brien	139	8.8	
Total formal votes		1,573	97.0	
Informal votes		49	3.0	
Turnout		1,622	72.4	
Independent gain from National Federal				

=== The Tweed ===
1898 New South Wales colonial election: The Tweed
Party	Candidate	Votes	%	±%
Independent	Richard Meagher	649	63.6	
National Federal	Joseph Kelly	360	35.3	
Ind. Free Trade	William Baker	12	1.2	
Total formal votes		1,021	98.9	
Informal votes		11	1.1	
Turnout		1,032	48.4	
Independent gain from National Federal				

=== Uralla-Walcha ===
1898 New South Wales colonial election: Uralla-Walcha
Party	Candidate	Votes	%	±%
National Federal	William Piddington	550	55.4	
Independent Federalist	Robert Brown	395	39.8	
Free Trade	Cornelius Danahey	48	4.8	
Total formal votes		993	98.2	
Informal votes		18	1.8	
Turnout		1,011	57.8	
Member changed to National Federal from Free Trade				

=== Wagga Wagga ===
1898 New South Wales colonial election: Wagga Wagga
Party	Candidate	Votes	%	±%
National Federal	James Gormly	742	70.6	
Independent	John Norman	309	29.4	
Total formal votes		1,051	99.3	
Informal votes		7	0.7	
Turnout		1,058	52.6	
National Federal hold				

=== Wallsend ===
1898 New South Wales colonial election: Wallsend
Party	Candidate	Votes	%	±%
Labour	David Watkins	1,012	61.3	
National Federal	William Fletcher	639	38.7	
Total formal votes		1,651	99.5	
Informal votes		9	0.5	
Turnout		1,660	72.5	
Labour hold				

=== Waratah ===
1898 New South Wales colonial election: Waratah
Party	Candidate	Votes	%	±%
Labour	Arthur Griffith	817	50.4	
National Federal	John Gilbert	805	49.6	
Total formal votes		817	100.0	
Informal votes		1,622	0.0	
Turnout		9	0.6	
Labour hold				

=== Warringah ===
1898 New South Wales colonial election: Warringah
Party	Candidate	Votes	%	±%
National Federal	Dugald Thomson	805	55.0	
Free Trade	Tom Rolin	660	45.1	
Total formal votes		1,465	99.5	
Informal votes		7	0.5	
Turnout		1,472	65.9	
Member changed to National Federal from Free Trade				

=== Waterloo ===
1898 New South Wales colonial election: Waterloo
Party	Candidate	Votes	%	±%
Free Trade	George Anderson	872	50.2	
National Federal	William Martin	499	28.7	
Labour	Frederick Flowers	357	20.5	
Independent	Henry Maynard	9	0.5	
Independent	Edward Sweeney	1	0.1	
Total formal votes		1,738	99.2	
Informal votes		14	0.8	
Turnout		1,752	62.8	
Free Trade hold				

=== Waverley ===
1898 New South Wales colonial election: Waverley
Party	Candidate	Votes	%	±%
Free Trade	Thomas Jessep	998	56.3	
National Federal	James Onslow	773	43.6	
Independent Federalist	William Blunt	2	0.1	
Total formal votes		1,773	99.2	
Informal votes		15	0.8	
Turnout		1,788	63.1	
Free Trade hold				

=== Wellington ===
1898 New South Wales colonial election: Wellington
Party	Candidate	Votes	%	±%
Free Trade	John Haynes	1,026	57.0	
National Federal	William Galloway	775	43.0	
Total formal votes		1,801	98.5	
Informal votes		28	1.5	
Turnout		1,829	61.9	
Free Trade hold				

=== Wentworth ===
1898 New South Wales colonial election: Wentworth
Party	Candidate	Votes	%	±%
National Federal	Sir Joseph Abbott	577	69.0	
Labour	Robert Scobie	259	31.0	
Total formal votes		836	98.8	
Informal votes		10	1.2	
Turnout		846	43.7	
National Federal hold				

=== West Macquarie ===
1898 New South Wales colonial election: West Macquarie
Party	Candidate	Votes	%	±%
National Federal	Paddy Crick	888	55.6	
Free Trade	John Hurley	689	43.1	
Independent Federalist	Edward Goldsby	20	1.3	
Total formal votes		1,597	98.3	
Informal votes		28	1.7	
Turnout		1,625	57.3	
National Federal hold				

=== West Maitland ===
1898 New South Wales colonial election: West Maitland
Party	Candidate	Votes	%	±%
Free Trade	John Gillies	1,141	64.8	
National Federal	Walter Edmunds	620	35.2	
Total formal votes		1,761	99.3	
Informal votes		13	0.7	
Turnout		1,774	70.6	
Free Trade hold				

=== Wickham ===
1898 New South Wales colonial election: Wickham
Party	Candidate	Votes	%	±%
Free Trade	John Fegan	747	47.8	
National Federal	Eden George	478	30.6	
Labour	Frank Butler	338	21.6	
Total formal votes		1,563	99.5	
Informal votes		8	0.5	
Turnout		1,571	72.8	
Free Trade hold				

=== Wilcannia ===
1898 New South Wales colonial election: Wilcannia
Party	Candidate	Votes	%	±%
Labour	Richard Sleath	770	72.0	
National Federal	Edmond O'Donnell	300	28.0	
Total formal votes		1,070	99.5	
Informal votes		5	0.5	
Turnout		1,075	42.6	
Labour hold				

=== Willoughby ===
1898 New South Wales colonial election: Willoughby
Party	Candidate	Votes	%	±%
Free Trade	George Howarth	980	47.8	
National Federal	Joseph Cullen	578	28.2	
Independent	Herbert McIntosh	356	17.4	
Independent	William Brown	113	5.5	
Independent	John Roberts	14	0.7	
Independent	William Stoddart	10	0.5	
Total formal votes		2,051	99.7	
Informal votes		7	0.3	
Turnout		2,058	64.6	
Free Trade hold				

=== Woollahra ===
1898 New South Wales colonial election: Woollahra
Party	Candidate	Votes	%	±%
Free Trade	John Garland	650	46.7	
National Federal	William Manning	476	34.2	
Ind. Free Trade	William Latimer	267	19.2	
Total formal votes		1,393	99.7	
Informal votes		4	0.3	
Turnout		1,397	60.1	
Free Trade hold				

=== Woronora ===
1898 New South Wales colonial election: Woronora
Party	Candidate	Votes	%	±%
Free Trade	John Nicholson (Note: This was the only election at which John Nicholson was listed as a Free Trade member and Antony Green suggests he may have been better classified as Independent Labour.)	945	66.7	
National Federal	Albion Croft	472	33.3	
Total formal votes		945	100.0	
Informal votes		1,417	0.0	
Turnout		8	0.6	
Member changed to Free Trade from Independent Labour				

=== Yass ===
1898 New South Wales colonial election: Yass
Party	Candidate	Votes	%	±%
Free Trade	William Affleck	599	46.5	
National Federal	Bernard Grogan	560	43.4	
Independent Federalist	George Harrison	130	10.1	
Total formal votes		1,289	98.8	
Informal votes		16	1.2	
Turnout		1,305	63.4	
Free Trade hold				

=== Young ===
1898 New South Wales colonial election: Young
Party	Candidate	Votes	%	±%
Labour	Chris Watson	1,244	58.7	
National Federal	Richard O'Connor	876	41.3	
Total formal votes		2,120	99.2	
Informal votes		18	0.8	
Turnout		2,138	72.4	
Labour hold				

== See also ==
- Candidates of the 1898 New South Wales colonial election
- Members of the New South Wales Legislative Assembly, 1898–1901
