= Candidates of the 1898 New South Wales colonial election =

This is a list of candidates for the 1898 New South Wales colonial election. The election was held on 27 July 1898.

The Protectionist Party contested this election under the name "National Federal Party", reflecting their focus on the issue of Federation.

== Retiring members ==
=== National Federal ===
- Michael Phillips MLA (Cowra)

=== Free Trade ===
- George Greene MLA (Grenfell)
- Leslie Hollis MLA (Goulburn)
- Adrian Knox MLA (Woollahra)

=== Labor ===
- Thomas Davis MLA (Sydney-Pyrmont)
- George Smailes MLA (Granville)

== Legislative Assembly ==
Sitting members are shown in bold text. Successful candidates are highlighted in the relevant colour. Where there is possible confusion, an asterisk (*) is also used.

Electorate	Held by	National Federal candidate	Free Trade candidate	Labor candidate	Other candidates
Albury	Free Trade	Thomas Griffith	**Richard Ball**		
Alma	Labor	William Harding		**Josiah Thomas**	Charles Counsell (Ind)
Annandale	Free Trade	Reginald Cohen	**William Mahony**		
Argyle	National Federal	**Thomas Rose**	Francis Isaac		
Armidale	Free Trade	Charles Wilson	**Edmund Lonsdale**		
Ashburnham	National Federal	**Joseph Reymond**	Albert Gardiner		
Ashfield	Free Trade	Bernhard Wise	**Thomas Bavister**		
Ballina	National Federal	**John Perry**			Thomas Temperley (Ind Fed)
Balmain North	Free Trade	Leonard Green	**Bill Wilks**		Alexander Milne (Ind Fed)
Balmain South	Labor	William Traill		**Sydney Law**	Gilbert Murdoch (Ind Fed); Charles Taylor (Ind)
Barwon	National Federal	**William Willis**		Donald Macdonell	
Bathurst	Free Trade	Francis Suttor	**Sydney Smith**		
Bega	National Federal	**Henry Clarke**			William Boot (Ind Fed); William Braine (Ind Fed)
Bingara	Free Trade	William McIntyre	**Samuel Moore**		
Boorowa	National Federal	**Kenneth Mackay**		James Toomey	
Botany	Labor	Charles Swinbourne		**John Dacey**	James Macfadyen (Ind Fed); William Stephen (Ind FT); William Wall (Ind Fed)
Bourke	Free Trade	William Davis	**Edward Millen**		
Bowral	Free Trade	F. N. Yarwood	**William McCourt**		
Braidwood	National Federal	**Austin Chapman**	Charles Beale		
Broken Hill	Labor	Alexander Hendry		**John Cann**	
Burwood	Free Trade	**William McMillan**			William Archer* (Ind FT); James Eve (Ind FT)
Camden	Free Trade	John Kidd	**Charles Bull**		Henry Willis (Ind)
Canterbury	Free Trade	Thomas Bavin	**Varney Parkes**		George Rundle (Ind Fed)
Clarence	National Federal	**John McFarlane**			
Cobar	National Federal	Michael O'Halloran		William Spence	Richard Machattie (Ind Fed); Samuel Wood (Ind)
Condoublin	Labor	Andrew Stewart		**Thomas Brown**	
Coonamble	Labor	William Alison		**Hugh Macdonald**	
Cowra	National Federal	**Thomas Waddell**		Hector Lamond	
Darlington	National Federal	**William Schey**	Thomas Clarke		William Hall (Ind FT); James Jones (Ind); Michael Keating (Ind Fed)
Deniliquin	National Federal	**John Chanter**			George Berryman (Ind)
Dubbo	Free Trade	James Morgan	**Simeon Phillips**		
Durham	National Federal	**Herbert Brown**			Walter Bennett (Ind Fed)
East Maitland	Free Trade	Samuel Clift	**James Brunker**		
Eden-Bombala	National Federal	**William Wood**			Henry Dawson (Ind Fed); Samuel Woods (Ind Fed)
Glebe	Free Trade	Bruce Smith	**James Hogue**		
Glen Innes	National Federal	**Francis Wright**			Thomas Chandler (Ind); John Wetherspoon (Ind)
Gloucester	National Federal	**Richard Price**	Frederick Hooke		
Goulburn	Free Trade	Arthur Barrett	**James Ashton**		
Grafton	National Federal	**John See**			Frederick McGuren (Ind Fed)
Granville	Labor	William Windsor	John Nobbs	Charles Dyer	
Grenfell	Free Trade	Andrew Kelly		William Holman	
Gundagai	National Federal	**John Barnes**		William Matchett	John Miller (Ind Fed); Waldo Sibthorpe (Ind Fed)
Gunnedah	National Federal	**Thomas Goodwin**	John Kirkpatrick		William Case (Ind Fed)
Hartley	Free Trade	John Tabrett	**Joseph Cook**		
Hastings and Macleay	National Federal	**Francis Clarke**			
Hawkesbury	Free Trade	John Paine	**William Morgan**		William Dean (Ind Fed); Brinsley Hall (Ind Fed)
Hay	Free Trade	James Newton	Frank Byrne		Allen Lakeman (Ind Fed)
Hume	National Federal	**William Lyne**	William Wiesner		
Illawarra	Free Trade	Thomas Kennedy	**Archibald Campbell**		
Inverell	National Federal	**George Cruickshank**			Thomas Jones (Ind)
Kahibah	Labor	Oswald Steel		**Alfred Edden**	William Richardson (Ind Fed); William Williams (Ind)
Kiama	National Federal	**Alexander Campbell**	George Fuller		
Lachlan	National Federal	**James Carroll**			C. N. Broome (Ind FT); Alexander Cameron (Ind Fed)
Leichhardt	Free Trade	Richard Colonna-Close	**John Hawthorne**	George Clark	
Lismore	National Federal	**Thomas Ewing**			James Walker (Ind Fed)
Macquarie	National Federal	**William Hurley**	Robert Thompson		Allen Carmichael (Ind FT); Frank Foster (Ind); William Paul (Ind FT); David Todd (Ind)
Manning	Free Trade	David Cowan	**James Young**		
Marrickville	Free Trade	David Chenhall	**Francis McLean**		William Clarke (Ind Fed); Elliot Johnson (Ind FT); William Webster (Ind)
Molong	National Federal	**Andrew Ross**	Harrington McCulloch		William Shield (Ind Fed)
Monaro	National Federal	**Gus Miller**			Hugh MacDonnell Ind); Granville Ryrie (Ind FT)
Moree	National Federal	**Thomas Hassall**	Henry Joseph		
Moruya	Free Trade	Albert Chapman	**William Millard**		John Brogan (Ind)
Mudgee	Free Trade	Edwin Richards	**Robert Jones**		
Murray	National Federal	**James Hayes**			
Murrumbidgee	National Federal	**Thomas Fitzpatrick**		Arthur Rae	
Narrabri	Labor	George Dale		**Hugh Ross**	William Borthwick (Ind Fed)
Nepean	National Federal	**Thomas Smith**	Samuel Lees		Alfred Reid (Ind FT)
Newcastle East	Free Trade	Jefferson Hester	**William Dick**		Robert Huntly (Ind)
Newcastle West	Labor	James Ellis		**James Thomson**	
Newtown-Camperdown	Free Trade	James Abigail	**Francis Cotton**	Edward Riley	Mikael Dunn (Ind); Thomas Evans (Ind Fed); James Smith (Ind Fed); George Spark (Ind Fed)
Newtown-Erskine	Free Trade	Harold Morgan	**Edmund Molesworth**		
Newtown-St Peters	Free Trade	George Edwards	**William Rigg**		Ernest Dent (Ind Fed); James Mitchell (Ind Fed); William Sherley (Ind); Hugh St George (Ind Fed)
Northumberland	Free Trade	Richard Stevenson	**Henry Wheeler**		
Orange	Free Trade	James Dalton	**Harry Newman**		
Paddington	Free Trade	Thomas West	**John Neild**		Arthur Fletcher (Ind FT)
Parramatta	Free Trade	Edwin Brown	**Dowell O'Reilly**		William Ferris* (Ind Fed); Joseph Withers (Ind Fed)
Petersham	Free Trade	John Cohen	**Llewellyn Jones**		Percy Hordern (Ind FT)
Queanbeyan	National Federal	**Edward O'Sullivan**	Alfred Allen		John Harper (Ind); Percy Hodgkinson (Ind)
Quirindi	National Federal	William Clapin		John Perry	**Robert Levien** (Ind)
Raleigh	Independent	Patrick Hogan			**John McLaughlin** (Ind)
Randwick	Free Trade	George Raffan	**David Storey**		
Redfern	Labor	William Cameron		**James McGowen**	Joseph Butterfield (Ind Fed); William Hunter (Ind)
Richmond	National Federal	**Robert Pyers**			John Willard (Ind FT)
Robertson	National Federal	**Robert Fitzgerald**	Thomas Houghton		
Ryde	Free Trade		**Frank Farnell**		Edward Foxall (Ind FT); Edward Terry* (Ind Fed)
Rylstone	Free Trade	Jack FitzGerald	**John Fitzpatrick**		
St George	Free Trade	George Waddell	**Joseph Carruthers**		Francis Brown (Ind)
St Leonards	Free Trade	Fountain Winter	**Edward Clark**		Andrew Eaton (Ind Fed); Robert Moodie (Ind Fed)
Sherbrooke	Free Trade	Broughton O'Conor	**Jacob Garrard**		James Purser (Ind)
Shoalhaven	Independent	**Philip Morton**			David Davis (Ind Fed)
Singleton	Free Trade	Charles Dight	**Albert Gould**		
Sturt	Labor	Thomas Walker		**William Ferguson**	Alexander Hendry (Ind)
Sydney-Belmore	Free Trade	Henry Hoyle	**James Graham**		Joseph Carlos (Ind Fed); Harry Foran (Ind)
Sydney-Bligh	Free Trade	Patrick Quinn	**James Harvey**		William McNamara (Ind)
Sydney-Cook	Free Trade	George Lewis	**Samuel Whiddon**		Suleman Amein (Ind); Daniel Healey (Ind)
Sydney-Denison	Free Trade	William Henson	**Matthew Harris**		Alexander Hutchison (Ind); Thomas O'Reilly (Ind)
Sydney-Fitzroy	Independent	**John Norton**	Henry Chapman		Patrick Dorahy (Ind Fed); Daniel Levy (Ind FT); Percy Tighe (Ind Fed)
Sydney-Flinders	National Federal	**Arthur Nelson**	John Dobbie	Robert Cropley	Ernest Gardner (Ind Fed); William Gocher (Ind)
Sydney-Gipps	Labor	Wilfred Spruson		**George Black**	Thomas Kohen (Ind Lab)
Sydney-King	Free Trade	Edmund Barton	**George Reid**		Robert Reid (Ind)
Sydney-Lang	Labor	Joseph Chuck		**Billy Hughes**	David Fealy (Ind Fed); John Strachan (Ind)
Sydney-Phillip	National Federal	**Henry Copeland**	Robert Hollis		Ralph Hodgson (Ind FT)
Sydney-Pyrmont	Labor	Daniel O'Connor		Samuel Smith	John Carter (Ind); Frederick Marshall (Ind FT)
Tamworth	Free Trade	William Sawers	**Albert Piddington**		
Tenterfield	Free Trade	John Reid	**Charles Lee**		
Tumut	National Federal	**Travers Jones**		Robert Joyce	Robert Donaldson* (Ind); John Keenan (Ind Fed); Daniel O'Brien (Ind Fed)
Tweed	National Federal	**Joseph Kelly**			William Baker (Ind FT); Richard Meagher* (Ind)
Uralla-Walcha	Free Trade	**William Piddington**	Cornelius Danahey		Robert Brown (Ind Fed)
Wagga Wagga	National Federal	**James Gormly**			John Norman (Ind)
Wallsend	Labor	William Fletcher		**David Watkins**	
Waratah	Labor	John Gilbert		**Arthur Griffith**	
Warringah	Free Trade	**Dugald Thomson**	Tom Rolin		
Waterloo	Free Trade	William Martin	**George Anderson**	Frederick Flowers	Henry Maynard (Ind); Edward Sweeney (Ind)
Waverley	Free Trade	James Macarthur-Onslow	**Thomas Jessep**		William Blunt (Ind Fed)
Wellington	Free Trade	William Galloway	**John Haynes**		
Wentworth	National Federal	**Sir Joseph Abbott**		Robert Scobie	
West Macquarie	National Federal	**Paddy Crick**	John Hurley		Edward Goldsby (Ind Fed)
West Maitland	Free Trade	Walter Edmunds	**John Gillies**		
Wickham	Free Trade	Eden George	**John Fegan**	Frank Butler	
Wilcannia	Labor	Edmond O'Donnell		**Richard Sleath**	
Willoughby	Free Trade	Joseph Cullen	**George Howarth**		William Brown (Ind); Herbert McIntosh (Ind); John Roberts (Ind); William Stoddart (Ind)
Woollahra	Free Trade	William Manning	John Garland		William Latimer (Ind FT)
Woronora	Independent	Albion Croft	**John Nicholson**		
Yass	Free Trade	Bernard Grogan	**William Affleck**		George Harrison (Ind Fed)
Young	Labor	Richard O'Connor		**Chris Watson**	

== See also ==
- Members of the New South Wales Legislative Assembly, 1898–1901
