= Electoral results for the district of Namoi =

Election results for Namoi, New South Wales, Australia

Namoi, an electoral district of the Legislative Assembly in the Australian state of New South Wales had two incarnations, from 1880 to 1894 and from 1904 to 1950.

Election	Member	Party				
1880	Thomas Dangar	None				
1882	Thomas Dangar	None				
1885	Charles Collins	None				
1887	Thomas Dangar	Free Trade				
1889	Thomas Dangar	Free Trade				
1890 by	Charles Collins	Free Trade	Member	Party		
1891	Charles Collins	Free Trade	Job Sheldon	Labour		
Election	Member	Party				
1904	Albert Ernest Collins	Independent Liberal				
1907	Albert Ernest Collins	Independent Liberal				
1910	George Black	Labor				
1913	George Black	Labor / Independent Labor				
1917	Walter Wearne	Ind. Nationalist	Member	Party	Member	Party
1920	Walter Wearne	Progressive	Frank Chaffey	Nationalist	Patrick Scully	Labor
1922	Walter Wearne	Nationalist	Frank Chaffey	Nationalist	Patrick Scully	Labor
1923 apt	Walter Wearne	Nationalist	Frank Chaffey	Nationalist	William Scully	Labor
1925	Walter Wearne	Nationalist	Frank Chaffey	Nationalist	William Scully	Labor
1927	William Scully	Labor				
1930	William Scully	Labor				
1932	Colin Sinclair	Country				
1935	Colin Sinclair	Country				
1938	Colin Sinclair	Country				
1941	Raymond Hamilton	Labor				
1944	Raymond Hamilton	Labor				
1947	Raymond Hamilton	Labor				

== Election results ==
=== Elections in the 1940s ===
==== 1947 ====
1947 New South Wales state election: Namoi
Party	Candidate	Votes	%	±%
Labor	Raymond Hamilton	6,634	51.2	−8.4
Country	Malcolm Heath	6,313	48.8	+8.4
Total formal votes		12,947	99.1	+0.7
Informal votes		111	0.9	−0.7
Turnout		13,058	95.0	+7.4
Labor hold		Swing	−8.4	

==== 1944 ====
1944 New South Wales state election: Namoi
Party	Candidate	Votes	%	±%
Labor	Raymond Hamilton	7,036	59.6	+26.6
Country	Lancelot Thomas	4,762	40.4	+7.7
Total formal votes		11,798	98.4	+0.1
Informal votes		194	1.6	−0.1
Turnout		11,992	87.6	−5.5
Labor hold		Swing	+6.9	

==== 1941 ====
1941 New South Wales state election: Namoi
Party	Candidate	Votes	%	±%
Labor	Raymond Hamilton	4,387	33.0	
Country	Ernest Batchelor	4,351	32.7	
Independent Labor	Ernest Hogan	2,978	22.4	
Country	George Gilby	1,591	12.0	
Total formal votes		13,307	98.3	
Informal votes		231	1.7	
Turnout		13,538	93.1	
Two-party-preferred result
Labor	Raymond Hamilton	7,016	52.7	
Country	Ernest Batchelor	6,291	47.3	
Labor gain from Country		Swing		

=== Elections in the 1930s ===
==== 1938 ====
1938 New South Wales state election: Namoi
Party	Candidate	Votes	%	±%
Country	Colin Sinclair	7,516	51.3	−1.3
Labor	Ernest Hogan	7,120	48.7	+1.3
Total formal votes		14,636	99.0	+0.4
Informal votes		150	1.0	−0.4
Turnout		14,786	96.6	+1.2
Country hold		Swing	−1.3	

==== 1935 ====
1935 New South Wales state election: Namoi
Party	Candidate	Votes	%	±%
Country	Colin Sinclair	7,404	52.6	−3.7
Labor (NSW)	William Scully	6,678	47.4	+3.7
Total formal votes		14,082	98.6	−0.4
Informal votes		194	1.4	+0.4
Turnout		14,276	95.4	−0.9
Country hold		Swing	N/A	

==== 1932 ====
1932 New South Wales state election: Namoi
Party	Candidate	Votes	%	±%
Country	Colin Sinclair	7,264	56.3	+13.6
Labor (NSW)	William Scully	5,484	42.5	−14.8
Independent	Ernest Bachelor	151	1.2	+1.2
Total formal votes		12,899	99.0	+0.2
Informal votes		130	1.0	−0.2
Turnout		13,029	96.3	+0.9
Country gain from Labor (NSW)		Swing	N/A	

==== 1930 ====
1930 New South Wales state election: Namoi
Party	Candidate	Votes	%	±%
Labor	William Scully	7,286	57.3	
Country	William Waterford	5,430	42.7	
Total formal votes		12,716	98.8	
Informal votes		153	1.2	
Turnout		12,869	95.4	
Labor hold		Swing		

=== Elections in the 1920s ===
==== 1927 ====
1927 New South Wales state election: Namoi
Party	Candidate	Votes	%	±%
Labor	William Scully	6,035	50.1	
Nationalist	Leslie Seccombe	5,442	45.1	
Independent	Henry Jones	579	4.8	
Total formal votes		12,056	98.2	
Informal votes		216	1.8	
Turnout		12,272	79.5	
Labor win		(new seat)		

==== 1925 ====
1925 New South Wales state election: Namoi
Party	Candidate	Votes	%	±%
Quota		6,621		
Labor	William Scully (elected 1)	9,487	35.8	+5.4
Labor	Michael Hagan	897	3.4	+3.4
Labor	James Hawkins	803	3.0	+3.0
Nationalist	Walter Wearne (elected 2)	5,639	21.3	+0.6
Nationalist	Frank Chaffey (elected 3)	4,696	17.7	−4.8
Progressive	Aubrey Abbott	3,395	12.8	+12.8
Progressive	Lachlan McLachlan	392	1.5	+1.5
Progressive	James Laird	227	0.9	+0.9
Independent	Robert Levien	947	3.6	−5.8
Total formal votes		26,483	96.3	+0.3
Informal votes		1,023	3.7	−0.3
Turnout		27,506	70.3	+0.1
Party total votes
Labor		11,187	42.2	+4.4
Nationalist		10,335	39.0	−4.1
Progressive		4,014	15.2	+5.5
Independent	Robert Levien	947	3.6	−5.8

==== 1923 appointment ====
Patrick Scully resigned on 20 September 1923. Between 1920 and 1927 the Legislative Assembly was elected using a form of proportional representation with multi-member seats and a single transferable vote (modified Hare-Clark). The Parliamentary Elections (Casual Vacancies) Act, provided that casual vacancies were filled by the next unsuccessful candidate "who represents the same party interest as the late member". William Scully had the highest number of votes of the unsuccessful Labor candidates at the 1922 election and took his seat on 20 September 1923.

==== 1922 ====
1922 New South Wales state election: Namoi
Party	Candidate	Votes	%	±%
Quota		6,483		
Nationalist	Frank Chaffey (elected 2)	5,823	22.5	+9.4
Nationalist	Walter Wearne (elected 3)	5,363	20.7	+5.8
Labor	Patrick Scully (elected 1)	7,880	30.4	−6.5
Labor	William Scully	1,602	6.2	+4.4
Labor	Septimus Humphries	325	1.3	+1.3
Progressive	Roland Green	1,906	7.3	+7.3
Progressive	Albert Studdy	599	2.3	+2.3
Independent	Robert Levien	2,433	9.4	−1.2
Total formal votes		25,931	96.0	+2.5
Informal votes		1,087	4.0	−2.5
Turnout		27,018	70.2	+8.5
Party total votes
Nationalist		11,186	43.1	+18.0
Labor		9,807	37.8	−3.6
Progressive		2,505	9.7	−13.2
Independent	Robert Levien	2,433	9.4	−1.2

==== 1920 ====
1920 New South Wales state election: Namoi
Party	Candidate	Votes	%	±%
Quota		5,432		
Labor	Patrick Scully (elected 1)	8,007	36.9	
Labor	Thomas Boland	592	2.7	
Labor	William Scully	396	1.8	
Nationalist	Frank Chaffey (elected 2)	2,848	13.1	
Nationalist	John Crane (defeated)	2,605	12.0	
Progressive	Walter Wearne (elected 3)	3,244	14.9	
Progressive	Frank Heywood	969	4.5	
Progressive	Charles Woollett	754	3.5	
Independent	Robert Levien	2,309	10.6	
Total formal votes		21,724	93.5	
Informal votes		1,517	6.5	
Turnout		23,241	61.7	
Party total votes
Labor		8,995	41.4	
Nationalist		5,453	25.1	
Progressive		4,967	22.9	
Independent	Robert Levien	2,309	10.6	

=== Elections in the 1910s ===
==== 1917 ====
1917 New South Wales state election: Namoi
Party	Candidate	Votes	%	±%
Ind. Nationalist	Walter Wearne	2,389	42.3	+42.3
Labor	Thomas Egan	2,373	42.0	−11.3
Independent Labor	George Black	883	15.6	+15.6
Total formal votes		5,645	98.0	+0.9
Informal votes		117	2.0	−0.9
Turnout		5,762	61.0	−2.7

1917 New South Wales state election: Namoi - Second Round
Party	Candidate	Votes	%	±%
Ind. Nationalist	Walter Wearne	3,112	55.3	
Labor	Thomas Egan	2,516	44.7	
Total formal votes		5,628	99.6	+1.6
Informal votes		25	0.4	−1.6
Turnout		5,653	59.9	−1.1
Ind. Nationalist gain from Labor				

The sitting member George Black was expelled from Labor in the November 1916 Labor split over conscription.

==== 1913 ====
1913 New South Wales state election: Namoi
Party	Candidate	Votes	%	±%
Labor	George Black	3,151	53.3	
Liberal Reform	James Florance	2,760	46.7	
Total formal votes		5,911	97.1	
Informal votes		177	2.9	
Turnout		6,088	63.7	
Labor hold				

==== 1910 ====
1910 New South Wales state election: The Namoi
Party	Candidate	Votes	%	±%
Labour	George Black	3,267	60.3	+14.2
Independent Liberal	Hubert O'Reilly	2,153	39.7	
Total formal votes		5,420	97.1	+0.2
Informal votes		160	2.9	−0.2
Turnout		5,580	54.8	−11.1
Labour gain from Independent Liberal				

=== Elections in the 1900s ===
==== 1907 ====
1907 New South Wales state election: The Namoi
Party	Candidate	Votes	%	±%
Independent Liberal	Albert Collins (Note: Albert Collins was supported by the Liberal Reform Party as having assisted in the work of the government and generally favourable to its policies.)	2,531	53.9	
Labour	William Walton	2,165	46.1	
Total formal votes		4,696	96.9	
Informal votes		149	3.1	
Turnout		4,845	65.9	
Independent Liberal hold				

==== 1904 ====
1904 New South Wales state election: The Namoi
Party	Candidate	Votes	%	±%
Independent Liberal	Albert Collins	2,070	55.9	
Labour	Thomas Shakespeare	1,632	44.1	
Total formal votes		3,702	99.3	
Informal votes		28	0.8	
Turnout		3,730	57.7	
Independent Liberal win		(new seat)		

The Namoi was a re-created seat comprising the abolished seat of Narrabri as well as parts of the abolished seats of Gunnedah and The Barwon. The member for Narrabri was Albert Collins (Liberal Reform), who was not a member of Liberal Reform but was recommended by the party. The member for Gunnedah was David Hall (Labour) who unsuccessfully contested Liverpool Plains.

District re-created

==== 1894 - 1904 ====
District abolished

=== Elections in the 1890s ===
==== 1891 ====
This section is an excerpt from 1891 New South Wales colonial election § The Namoi

1891 New South Wales colonial election: The Namoi Friday 26 June
Party	Candidate	Votes	%	±%
Labour	Job Sheldon (elected 1)	995	39.5	
Free Trade	Charles Collins (re-elected 2)	825	32.8	
Free Trade	John Mackay	697	27.7	
Total formal votes		2,517	99.6	
Informal votes		11	0.4	
Turnout		1,660	51.6	
Labour win 1		(1 new seat)		
Free Trade hold 1		(1 new seat)		

==== 1890 by-election ====
1890 Namoi by-election Thursday 31 July
Party	Candidate	Votes	%	±%
Free Trade	Charles Collins (elected)	821	73.8	
Free Trade	David Jones	292	26.2	
Total formal votes		1,113	99.0	
Informal votes		11	1.0	
Turnout		1,124	36.7	
Free Trade hold				

Tom Dangar (Free Trade) died.

=== Elections in the 1880s ===
==== 1889 ====
This section is an excerpt from 1889 New South Wales colonial election § The Namoi

1889 New South Wales colonial election: The Namoi Wednesday 13 February
Party	Candidate	Votes	%	±%
Free Trade	Thomas Dangar (elected)	733	61.2	
Protectionist	William Buchanan	464	38.8	
Total formal votes		1,197	97.0	
Informal votes		37	3.0	
Turnout		1,234	41.6	
Free Trade hold				

==== 1887 ====
This section is an excerpt from 1887 New South Wales colonial election § The Namoi

1887 New South Wales colonial election: The Namoi Tuesday 22 February
Party	Candidate	Votes	%	±%
Free Trade	Thomas Dangar (elected)	762	65.0	
Free Trade	George Dale	411	35.0	
Total formal votes		1,173	98.3	
Informal votes		20	1.7	
Turnout		1,193	47.4	

==== 1885 ====
This section is an excerpt from 1885 New South Wales colonial election § The Namoi

1885 New South Wales colonial election: The Namoi Monday 26 October
Candidate	Votes	%
Charles Collins (elected)	743	72.1
William Wright	288	27.9
Total formal votes	1,031	99.2
Informal votes	8	0.8
Turnout	1,039	48.0

The sitting member Thomas Dangar unsuccessfully contested The Gwydir.

==== 1882 ====
This section is an excerpt from 1882 New South Wales colonial election § The Namoi

1882 New South Wales colonial election: The Namoi Thursday 7 December
Candidate	Votes	%
Thomas Dangar (re-elected)	532	71.9
R H Hyman	208	28.1
Total formal votes	740	96.2
Informal votes	29	3.8
Turnout	769	38.7

==== 1880 ====
This section is an excerpt from 1880 New South Wales colonial election § The Namoi

1880 New South Wales colonial election: The Namoi Wednesday 24 November
Candidate	Votes	%
Thomas Dangar (re-elected)	unopposed	
	(new seat)	

Thomas Dangar was the sitting member for The Gwydir.
