= 1898 New South Wales colonial election =

Colonial election for New South Wales, Australia in July 1898

- 27 July 1898

All 125 seats in the New South Wales Legislative Assembly 63 seats needed for a majority
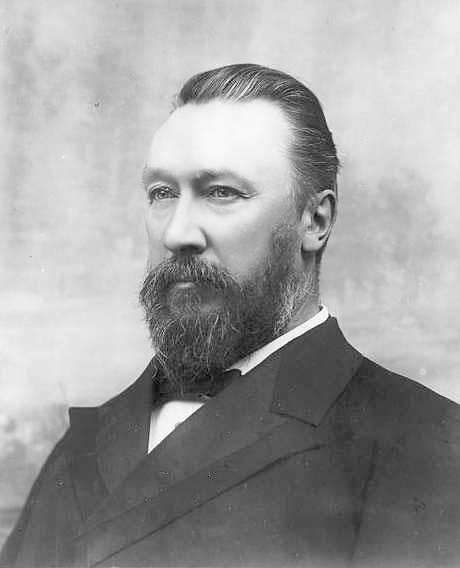

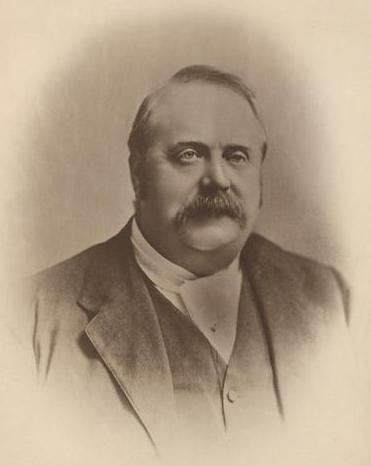

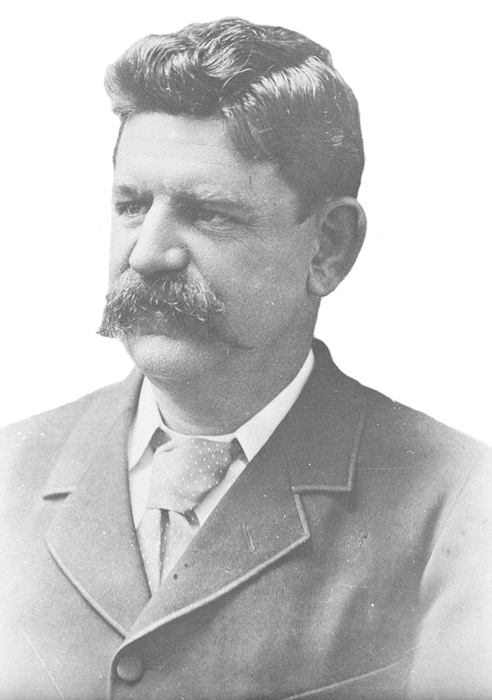
	First party	Second party	Third party
Leader	William Lyne	George Reid	James McGowen
Party	National Federal	Free Trade	Labor
Leader since	1895	September 1891	August 1894
Leader's seat	Hume	Sydney-King	Redfern
Last election	42 seats	58 seats	18 seats
Seats before	46 (Note: Four MPs − Henry Clarke (Bega), Philip Morton (The Shoalhaven), William Piddington (Uralla-Walcha) and Dugald Thomson (Warringah) − joined the National Federal Party prior to the 1898 election. Additionally, the party gained Sydney-Fitzroy at a by-election in June 1898. However, Harry Levien (Quirindi) left the party to sit as an independent.)	57 (Note: Two MPs − John Neild (Paddington) and John Nicholson (Woronora) − joined the Free Trade Party prior to the 1898 election, although this was the only election at which Nicholson was listed as a Free Trade member and Antony Green has suggested he may have been better classified as Independent Labour. William Piddington (Uralla-Walcha) and Dugald Thomson (Warringah) left the FTP and joined the National Federal Party. Additionally, the FTP lost Narrabri at a by-election in June 1898 after the death of Charles Collins.)	19 (Note: Labor gained Narrabri from the Free Trade Party at a by-election in June 1898.)
Seats won	52	45	19
Seat change	▲6	▼12	Steady
Popular vote	76,161	58,214	21,556
Percentage	43.03%	32.89%	12.18%
Swing	▲9.60	▼4.26	▼1.02
- Results of the election, showing the winning vote share of the elected member.
Premier before election
George Reid
Free Trade
Premier after election
George Reid
Free Trade

The 1898 New South Wales colonial election was held on 27 July 1898 for all of the 125 seats in the 18th New South Wales Legislative Assembly and it was conducted in single-member constituencies with a first past the post voting system. Section 23 (1) of the Parliamentary Electorates and Elections Act of 1893 conferred a right to vote on 'every male person, being a natural born [British] subject, who shall have resided or had his principal place of abode in New South Wales for a continuous period of one year'. The 18th parliament of New South Wales was dissolved on 8 July 1898 by the Governor, Lord Hampden, on the advice of the Premier, George Reid.

The Protectionist Party, the main Opposition, contested this election under the name "National Federal Party", reflecting the party's focus on Federation as an issue at the election.

== Key dates ==
Date	Event
8 July 1898	The Legislative Assembly was dissolved, and writs were issued by the Governor to proceed with an election.
18 – 22 July 1898	Nominations for candidates for the election closed at noon.
27 July 1898	Polling day.
16 August 1898	Opening of 18th Parliament.

== Results ==
New South Wales colonial election, 27 July 1898 Legislative Assembly << 1895–1901 >>
Enrolled voters	301,989				
Votes cast	176,998		Turnout	58.61	−1.31
Informal votes	1,638		Informal	0.92	+0.04
Summary of votes by party
Party	Primary votes	%	Swing	Seats	Change
National Federal	76,161	43.03	+9.60	52	+10
Free Trade	58,214	32.89	−4.26	45	−13
Labour	21,556	12.18	−1.02	19	+1
Independent Federalist	12,443	7.03	+2.71	4	+2
Independent	5,290	2.99	−0.38	4	+4
Ind. Free Trade	3,325	1.88	−5.44	1	−3
Independent Labour	9	0.01	−1.21	0	−1
Total	176,998			125	

Popular vote
Nat. Federal	43.03%
Free Trade	32.89%
Labor	12.18%
Ind. Federalist	7.03%
Independent	2.99%
Ind. Free Trade	1.88%
Ind. Labor	0.01%
Parliamentary seats
Nat. Federal	52
Free Trade	45
Labor	19
Ind. Federalist	4
Independent	4
Ind. Free Trade	1

== Retiring members ==
=== National Federal ===
- Michael Phillips MLA (Cowra)

=== Free Trade ===
- George Greene MLA (Grenfell)
- Leslie Hollis MLA (Goulburn)
- Adrian Knox MLA (Woollahra)

=== Labor ===
- Thomas Davis MLA (Sydney-Pyrmont)
- George Smailes MLA (Granville)

== Changing seats ==
Seats changing hands (Note: Compares members at the 1895 election and the 1898 election and does not include seats that changed party as a result of a by-election.)
Seat	1895		1898	
Seat	Party	Member	Party	Member
Albury	Free Trade	Richard Ball	National Federal	Thomas Griffith
Armidale	Free Trade	Edmund Lonsdale	National Federal	Charles Wilson
Ashfield	Free Trade	Thomas Bavister	National Federal	Bernhard Wise
Bathurst	Free Trade	Sydney Smith	National Federal	Francis Suttor
Bourke	Free Trade	Edward Millen	National Federal	William Davis
Burwood	Free Trade	William McMillan	Ind. Free Trade	William Archer
Camden	Free Trade	Charles Bull	National Federal	John Kidd
Cobar	National Federal	Thomas Waddell (Note: Thomas Waddell successfully contested Cowra.)	Labour	William Spence
Darlington	National Federal	William Schey	Free Trade	Thomas Clarke
Durham	National Federal	Herbert Brown	Independent Federalist	Walter Bennett
Granville	Labour	George Smailes (Note: Did not contest the election.)	Free Trade	John Nobbs
Grenfell	Ind. Free Trade	George Greene	Labour	William Holman
Mudgee	Free Trade	Robert Jones	National Federal	Edwin Richards
Narrabri	Free Trade	Charles Collins (Note: Charles Collins (Free Trade) died in 1898 and Hugh Ross (Labour) had won the seat in a by-election.)	Labour	Hugh Ross
The Nepean	National Federal	Thomas Smith	Free Trade	Samuel Lees
Northumberland	Free Trade	Henry Wheeler	National Federal	Richard Stevenson
Parramatta	Free Trade	Dowell O'Reilly	Independent Federalist	William Ferris
Petersham	Free Trade	Llewellyn Jones	National Federal	John Cohen
Ryde	Free Trade	Frank Farnell	Independent Federalist	Edward Terry
Sherbrooke	Free Trade	Jacob Garrard	National Federal	Broughton O'Conor
The Shoalhaven	Ind. Free Trade	Philip Morton (Note: Philip Morton had been elected as an Independent Free Trader but changed to National Federal.)	Independent Federalist	David Davis
Singleton	Free Trade	Albert Gould	National Federal	Charles Dight
Sydney-Bligh	Free Trade	James Harvey	National Federal	Patrick Quinn
Sydney-Fitzroy	Ind. Free Trade	John McElhone (Note: John McElhone (Independent Free Trade) died in 1898 and John Norton (National Federal) had won the seat in a by-election.)	Free Trade	Henry Chapman
Sydney-Gipps	Labour	George Black	National Federal	Wilfred Spruson
Tamworth	Free Trade	Albert Piddington	National Federal	William Sawers
Tumut	National Federal	Travers Jones	Independent	Robert Donaldson
The Tweed	National Federal	Joseph Kelly	Independent	Richard Meagher
Members changing party
Seat	1895		1898	
Seat	Party	Member	Party	Member
Bega	Independent Federalist	Henry Clarke	National Federal	Henry Clarke
Paddington	Ind. Free Trade	John Neild	Free Trade	John Neild
Quirindi	National Federal	Robert Levien	Independent	Robert Levien
Raleigh	Independent Federalist	John McLaughlin	Independent	John McLaughlin
Uralla-Walcha	Free Trade	William Piddington	National Federal	William Piddington
Warringah	Free Trade	Dugald Thomson	National Federal	Dugald Thomson
Woronora	Independent Labour	John Nicholson	Free Trade	John Nicholson

== See also ==
- Candidates of the 1898 New South Wales colonial election
- Members of the New South Wales Legislative Assembly, 1898–1901
