= Electoral results for the district of Shoalhaven =

Election result for Shoalhaven, New South Wales, Australia

Shoalhaven, an electoral district of the Legislative Assembly in the Australian state of New South Wales was created in 1859 and abolished in 1904.

Member	Party	Period
1859	John Garrett	None
1860	John Garrett	None
1862 by	John Robertson	None
1864	Thomas Garrett	None
1869	Thomas Garrett	None
1871 by	James Warden	None
1872	James Warden	None
1874	James Warden	None
1877	John Roseby	None
1880	John Roseby	None
1882	Frederick Humphery	None
1885	Frederick Humphery	None
1887	William Fraser Martin	Free Trade
1889	Philip Morton	Free Trade
1891	Philip Morton	Free Trade
1895	Philip Morton	Ind. Free Trade
1898	David Davis	Ind. Protectionist
1901	Mark Morton	Liberal Reform

== Election results ==
=== Elections in the 1900s ===
==== 1901 ====
1901 New South Wales state election: The Shoalhaven
Party	Candidate	Votes	%	±%
Liberal Reform	Mark Morton	927	55.5	
Progressive	David Davis	742	44.5	−11.5
Total formal votes		1,669	99.2	−0.1
Informal votes		14	0.8	+0.1
Turnout		1,683	83.7	+22.0
Liberal Reform gain from Ind. Progressive				

=== Elections in the 1890s ===
==== 1898 ====
1898 New South Wales colonial election: The Shoalhaven
Party	Candidate	Votes	%	±%
Independent Federalist	David Davis	882	55.9	
National Federal	Philip Morton	695	44.1	
Total formal votes		1,577	99.6	
Informal votes		7	0.4	
Turnout		1,584	70.9	
Independent Federalist gain from Ind. Free Trade				

Philip Morton had been elected as an Independent Free Trader but changed to National Federal.

==== 1895 ====
1895 New South Wales colonial election: The Shoalhaven
Party	Candidate	Votes	%	±%
Ind. Free Trade	Philip Morton	755	56.6	
Protectionist	Thomas Kennedy	571	42.8	
Ind. Protectionist	W Reid	7	0.5	
Total formal votes		1,333	97.8	
Informal votes		30	2.2	
Turnout		1,363	70.5	
Member changed to Ind. Free Trade from Free Trade				

==== 1894 ====
1894 New South Wales colonial election: The Shoalhaven
Party	Candidate	Votes	%	±%
Free Trade	Philip Morton	690	42.0	
Ind. Free Trade	William Kennedy	495	30.1	
Protectionist	John McLean	339	20.6	
Ind. Protectionist	George Sinclair	121	7.4	
Total formal votes		1,645	98.9	
Informal votes		18	1.1	
Turnout		1,663	83.7	
Free Trade hold				

==== 1891 ====
1891 New South Wales colonial election: Shoalhaven Friday 19 June
Party	Candidate	Votes	%	±%
Free Trade	Philip Morton (re-elected)	1,268	60.3	
Labour	John Maclean	836	39.7	
Total formal votes		2,104	98.2	
Informal votes		39	1.8	
Turnout		2,143	76.3	
Free Trade hold				

=== Elections in the 1880s ===
==== 1889 ====
1889 New South Wales colonial election: Shoalhaven Wednesday 13 February
Party	Candidate	Votes	%	±%
Free Trade	Philip Morton (elected)	1,233	68.4	
Protectionist	William Lovegrove	569	31.6	
Total formal votes		1,802	98.4	
Informal votes		30	1.6	
Turnout		1,832	73.3	
Free Trade hold				

==== 1887 ====
1887 New South Wales colonial election: Shoalhaven Monday 14 February
Party	Candidate	Votes	%	±%
Free Trade	William Martin (elected)	853	51.7	
Protectionist	William Lovegrove	798	48.3	
Total formal votes		1,651	99.1	
Informal votes		15	0.9	
Turnout		1,666	76.9	

==== 1885 ====
1885 New South Wales colonial election: Shoalhaven Monday 19 October
Candidate	Votes	%
Frederick Humphery (re-elected)	850	54.6
William Martin	706	45.4
Total formal votes	1,556	98.6
Informal votes	22	1.4
Turnout	1,578	78.0

==== 1882 ====
1882 New South Wales colonial election: Shoalhaven Thursday 7 December
Candidate	Votes	%
Frederick Humphery (elected)	790	52.4
John Roseby (defeated)	719	47.7
Total formal votes	1,509	98.6
Informal votes	21	1.4
Turnout	1,530	78.8

==== 1880 ====
1880 New South Wales colonial election: Shoalhaven Tuesday 23 November
Candidate	Votes	%
John Roseby (re-elected)	859	52.8
Frederick Humphery	767	47.2
Total formal votes	1,626	98.3
Informal votes	28	1.7
Turnout	1,654	85.4

=== Elections in the 1870s ===
==== 1877 ====
1877 New South Wales colonial election: Shoalhaven Wednesday 31 October
Candidate	Votes	%
John Roseby (elected)	591	50.5
Thomas Richards	579	49.5
Total formal votes	1,170	100.0
Informal votes	0	0.0
Turnout	1,193	76.6

==== 1874 ====
1874–75 New South Wales colonial election: Shoalhaven Friday 18 December 1874
Candidate	Votes	%
James Warden (re-elected)	unopposed	

==== 1872 ====
1872 New South Wales colonial election: Shoalhaven Tuesday 5 March
Candidate	Votes	%
James Warden (re-elected)	622	54.7
John Roseby	515	45.3
Total formal votes	1,137	97.8
Informal votes	26	2.2
Turnout	1,163	76.1

==== 1871 by-election ====
1871 Shoalhaven by-election Monday 21 August
Candidate	Votes	%
James Warden (elected)	Unopposed	

Thomas Garrett resigned.

=== Elections in the 1860s ===
==== 1869 ====
1869–70 New South Wales colonial election: Shoalhaven Tuesday 14 December 1869
Candidate	Votes	%
Thomas Garrett (re-elected)	633	54.4
Samuel Goold	530	45.6
Total formal votes	1,163	99.2
Informal votes	9	0.8
Turnout	1,190	83.0

==== 1864 ====
1864–65 New South Wales colonial election: Shoalhaven Wednesday 21 December 1864
Candidate	Votes	%
Thomas Garrett (re-elected)	472	52.6
Richard Kemp	350	39.0
R Seccombe	76	8.5
Total formal votes	898	100.0
Informal votes	0	0.0
Turnout	923	70.4

==== 1862 by-election ====
1862 Shoalhaven by-election
Candidate	Votes	%
John Robertson (elected)	Unopposed	

John Garrett resigned to become a police magistrate.

==== 1860 ====
1860 New South Wales colonial election: Shoalhaven Monday 17 December
Candidate	Votes	%
John Garrett (re-elected)	384	55.6
Richard Kemp	307	44.4
Total formal votes	691	100.0
Informal votes	0	0.0
Turnout	712	69.7

=== Elections in the 1850s ===
==== 1859 ====
1859 New South Wales colonial election: Shoalhaven Tuesday 21 June
Candidate	Votes	%
John Garrett (elected)	281	41.6
Charles Blakeney	222	32.8
Alexander Campbell	156	23.1
George Alley	17	2.5
Total formal votes	676	100.0
Informal votes	0	0.0
Turnout	676	73.8
