= Electoral results for the district of Narrabri =

Election results for Narrabri, New South Wales, Australia

Narrabri, an electoral district of the Legislative Assembly in the Australian state of New South Wales was created in 1894 and abolished in 1904.

Election	Member	Party
1894	Charles Collins	Free Trade
1895	Charles Collins	Free Trade
1898 by	Hugh Ross	Labour
1898	Hugh Ross	Labour
1901	Albert Collins	Liberal Reform

== Election results ==
=== Elections in the 1900s ===
==== 1901 ====
1901 New South Wales state election: Narrabri
Party	Candidate	Votes	%	±%
Liberal Reform	Albert Collins	738	51.2	
Labour	John Gately	520	36.1	−4.6
Ind. Progressive	Job Sheldon	184	12.8	
Total formal votes		1,442	99.7	+1.4
Informal votes		5	0.4	−1.4
Turnout		1,447	60.2	+1.6
Liberal Reform gain from Labour				

The sitting member was Hugh Ross (Labour) who unsuccessfully contested Quirindi.

=== Elections in the 1890s ===
==== 1898 ====
1898 New South Wales colonial election: Narrabri
Party	Candidate	Votes	%	±%
Labour	Hugh Ross	608	40.7	
National Federal	George Dale	522	34.9	
Independent Federalist	William Borthwick	365	24.4	
Total formal votes		1,495	98.3	
Informal votes		26	1.7	
Turnout		1,521	58.6	
Labour gain from Free Trade				

The sitting member Charles Collins (Free Trade) died in 1898 and Hugh Ross (Labour) had won the seat in a by-election.

==== 1898 by-election ====
1898 Narrabri by-election
Party	Candidate	Votes	%	±%
Labour	Hugh Ross	382	32.8	−3.0
Protectionist	George Dale	357	30.7	+30.7 (Note: At the 1895 election, the only Protectionist candidate − Job Sheldon − received 24.2% of the vote, meaning the combined Protectionist vote at the 1898 by-election (47.7%) was an increase of 23.5%. If compared to Sheldon's candidacy, George Dale had a positive swing of 6.5%, while Robert Barton had a negative swing of 7.2%.)
Protectionist	Robert Barton	198	17.0	+17.0
Free Trade	Gulielmus Williams	141	12.1	+12.1 (Note: At the 1895 election, the only Free Trade candidate − Charles Collins − received 40.1% of the vote, meaning the combined Free Trade vote at the 1898 by-election (19.5%) was a decrease of 20.6%. If compared to Sheldon's candidacy, Gulielmus Williams had a negative swing of 28%, while Thomas McGee had a negative swing of 32.7%.)
Free Trade	Thomas McGee	86	7.4	+7.4
Total formal votes		1,164	100.0	+0.3
Informal votes		0	0.0	−0.3
Turnout		1,164	60.4 (Note: Estimate based on a roll of 1,926 at the 1895 election.)	+4.8
Labour gain from Free Trade				

==== 1895 ====
1895 New South Wales colonial election: Narrabri
Party	Candidate	Votes	%	±%
Free Trade	Charles Collins	428	40.1	
Labour	Hugh Ross	382	35.8	
Protectionist	Job Sheldon	258	24.2	
Total formal votes		1,068	99.7	
Informal votes		3	0.3	
Turnout		1,071	55.6	
Free Trade hold				

==== 1894 ====
1894 New South Wales colonial election: Narrabri
Party	Candidate	Votes	%	±%
Free Trade	Charles Collins	672	48.7	
Labour	Hugh Ross	561	40.7	
Ind. Free Trade	Sydney Powell	130	9.4	
Independent	George Gregory	17	1.2	
Total formal votes		1,380	98.2	
Informal votes		26	1.9	
Turnout		1,406	74.1	
Free Trade win		(new seat)		
