= Electoral results for the district of Sydney-Bligh =

Election results for Sydney-Bligh, New South Wales, Australia

Sydney-Bligh, an electoral district of the Legislative Assembly in the Australian state of New South Wales, was created in 1894 and abolished in 1904.

Election	Member	Party
1894	James Martin	Free Trade
1895	James Harvey	Free Trade
1898	Patrick Quinn	National Federal
1901	Patrick Quinn	Progressive

== Election results ==
=== Elections in the 1900s ===
==== 1901 ====
1901 New South Wales state election: Sydney-Bligh
Party	Candidate	Votes	%	±%
Progressive	Patrick Quinn	781	49.7	−4.9
Liberal Reform	John Brindley	604	38.4	−5.6
Independent	John Hughes	85	5.4	
Labour	Daniel Healey	76	4.8	
Independent Liberal	John Campbell	27	1.7	
Total formal votes		1,573	99.8	+1.0
Informal votes		3	0.2	−1.0
Turnout		1,576	56.4	+2.9
Progressive hold				

=== Elections in the 1890s ===
==== 1898 ====
1898 New South Wales colonial election: Sydney-Bligh
Party	Candidate	Votes	%	±%
National Federal	Patrick Quinn	642	54.5	
Free Trade	James Harvey	518	44.0	
Independent	William McNamara	18	1.5	
Total formal votes		1,178	98.8	
Informal votes		14	1.2	
Turnout		1,192	53.5	
National Federal gain from Free Trade				

==== 1895 ====
1895 New South Wales colonial election: Sydney-Bligh
Party	Candidate	Votes	%	±%
Free Trade	James Harvey	515	46.7	
Protectionist	Patrick Quinn	317	28.8	
Ind. Free Trade	James Martin	257	23.3	
Labour	Reginald Daly	13	1.2	
Total formal votes		1,102	99.2	
Informal votes		9	0.8	
Turnout		1,111	59.4	
Free Trade hold				

==== 1894 ====
1894 New South Wales colonial election: Sydney-Bligh
Party	Candidate	Votes	%	±%
Free Trade	James Martin	609	39.8	
Labour	James Hendry	369	24.1	
Protectionist	James Murphy	265	17.3	
Ind. Free Trade	Unni Carpenter	218	14.3	
Ind. Protectionist	Patrick Hourigan	57	3.7	
Ind. Protectionist	Edward McConville	12	0.8	
Total formal votes		1,530	99.2	
Informal votes		12	0.8	
Turnout		1,542	79.8	
Free Trade win		(new seat)		
