= 1862 Shoalhaven colonial by-election =

By-election in New South Wales, Australia

A by-election was held for the New South Wales Legislative Assembly electorate of Shoalhaven in January 1861 because John Garrett resigned to become a police magistrate at Scone. The by-election allowed John Robertson to return to the Legislative Assembly after the Legislative Council had passed the Robertson Land Acts, which would open up the free selection of Crown land.

== Dates ==
Date	Event
19 December 1861	John Garrett resigned.
21 December 1861	Writ of election issued by the Speaker of the Legislative Assembly.
7 January 1861	Nominations
14 January 1861	Polling day
20 January 1861	Return of writ

== Results ==
1862 Shoalhaven by-election
Candidate	Votes	%
John Robertson (elected)	Unopposed	

== See also ==
- Electoral results for the district of Shoalhaven
- List of New South Wales state by-elections
