= 1890 Namoi colonial by-election =

By-election in New South Wales, Australia

A by-election was held for the New South Wales Legislative Assembly electorate of Namoi on 31 July 1890 because of the death of Tom Dangar (Free Trade).

== Dates ==
Date	Event
4 July 1890	Tom Dangar died.
9 July 1890	Writ of election issued by the Speaker of the Legislative Assembly and close of electoral rolls.
24 July 1890	Nominations
31 July 1890	Polling day
14 August 1890	Return of writ

== Candidates ==
- Charles Collins was a shop owner and businessman from Narrabri who had previously served as the member for Namoi, retiring at the 1887 election and was the first Mayor of Narrabri.
- David Jones was a pastoralist from Walgett, who had previously been a hotel owner and mail contractor in the region.

Both men were supporters of the former member Tom Dangar.

== Result ==
1890 Namoi by-election]] Thursday 31 July
Party	Candidate	Votes	%	±%
Free Trade	Charles Collins (elected)	821	73.8	
Free Trade	David Jones	292	26.2	
Total formal votes		1,113	99.0	
Informal votes		11	1.0	
Turnout		1,124	36.7	
Free Trade hold				

== See also ==
- Electoral results for the district of Namoi
- List of New South Wales state by-elections
