= 1898 Narrabri colonial by-election =

← 1895	3 June 1898	July 1898 →

Electoral district of Narrabri in the New South Wales Legislative Assembly
- Registered: 1,926 (Note: Estimate based on a roll of 1,926 at the 1895 election.)
- Turnout: 60.4% (▲4.8)
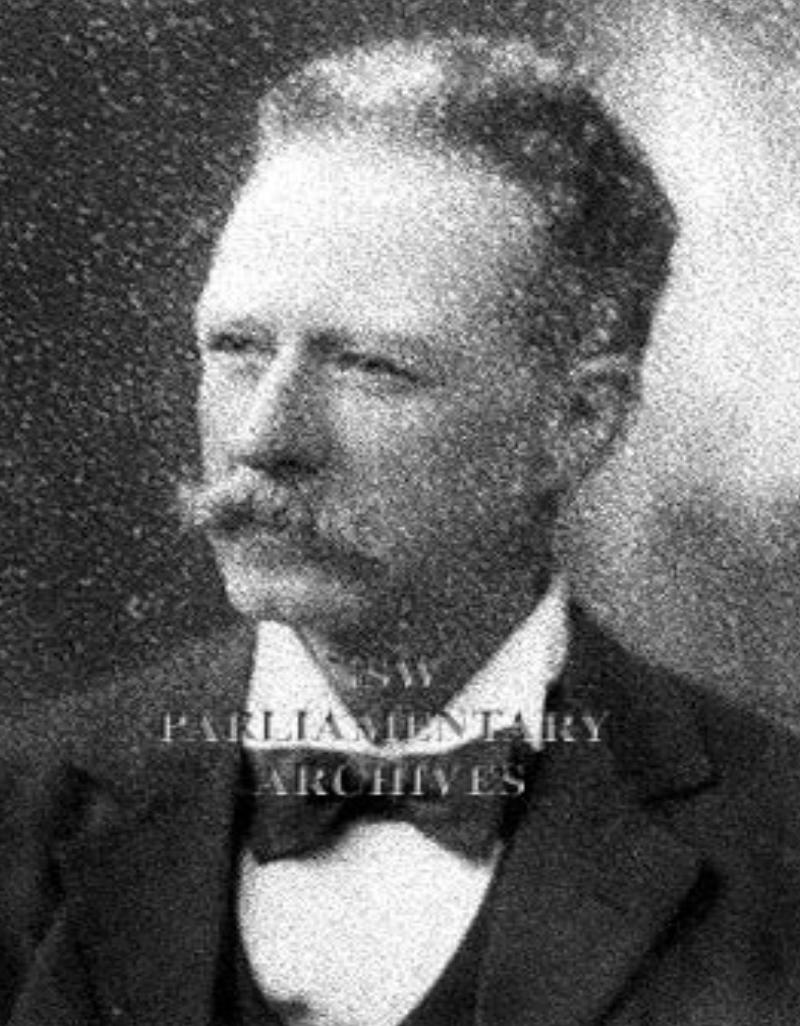
	First party	Second party
		PRO
Candidate	Hugh Ross	George Dale
Party	Labour	Protectionist
Popular vote	382	357
Percentage	32.8%	30.7%
Swing	▼3.0	▲30.7 (Note: At the 1895 election, the only Protectionist candidate − Job Sheldon − received 24.2% of the vote, meaning the combined Protectionist vote at the 1898 by-election (47.7%) was an increase of 23.5%. If compared to Sheldon's candidacy, George Dale had a positive swing of 6.5%, while Robert Barton had a negative swing of 7.2%.)
MP before election
Charles Collins
Free Trade
Elected MP
Hugh Ross
Labour

The 1898 Narrabri colonial by-election was held on 3 June 1898 to elect the member for Narrabri in the New South Wales Legislative Assembly, following the death of Free Trade MP Charles Collins. The vote was held on the same day as a by-election in Sydney-Fitzroy and a statewide referendum on the subject of federation.

The by-election was won by Labour Electoral League candidate Hugh Ross with 32.8% of the vote. He retained the seat 54 days later at the New South Wales colonial election on 27 July 1898.

== Key dates ==
- 12 April 1898 – Charles Collins died
- 2 May 1898 – Writ of election issued by the Speaker of the Legislative Assembly
- 13 May 1898 – Candidate nominations
- 3 June 1898 – Election day
- 10 June 1898 – Return of writ

== Result ==
1898 Narrabri by-election
Party	Candidate	Votes	%	±%
Labour	Hugh Ross	382	32.8	−3.0
Protectionist	George Dale	357	30.7	+30.7
Protectionist	Robert Barton	198	17.0	+17.0
Free Trade	Gulielmus Williams	141	12.1	+12.1 (Note: At the 1895 election, the only Free Trade candidate − Charles Collins − received 40.1% of the vote, meaning the combined Free Trade vote at the 1898 by-election (19.5%) was a decrease of 20.6%. If compared to Sheldon's candidacy, Gulielmus Williams had a negative swing of 28%, while Thomas McGee had a negative swing of 32.7%.)
Free Trade	Thomas McGee	86	7.4	+7.4
Total formal votes		1,164	100.0	+0.3
Informal votes		0	0.0	−0.3
Turnout		1,164	60.4	+4.8
Labour gain from Free Trade				

== See also ==
- Electoral results for the district of Narrabri
- List of New South Wales state by-elections
