= Electoral results for the district of Sydney-Fitzroy =

Election results for Sydney-Fitzroy, New South Wales, Australia

Sydney-Fitzroy, an electoral district of the Legislative Assembly in the Australian state of New South Wales, was created in 1894 and abolished in 1904.

Election	Member	Party
1894	Henry Chapman	Free Trade
1895	John McElhone	Ind. Free Trade
1898 by	John Norton	Protectionist
1898	Henry Chapman	Free Trade
1901	Daniel Levy	Liberal Reform

== Election results ==
=== Elections in the 1900s ===
==== 1901 ====
1901 New South Wales state election: Sydney-Fitzroy
Party	Candidate	Votes	%	±%
Liberal Reform	Daniel Levy	605	35.9	
Independent Liberal	Arthur McElhone	381	22.6	
Independent	Henry Chapman	379	22.5	
Labour	Donald McKinnon	121	7.2	
Ind. Progressive	Harry Foran	108	6.4	
Independent	Denis O'Sullivan	71	4.2	
Independent	Callaghan Garvan	20	1.2	
Total formal votes		1,685	99.1	+0.1
Informal votes		15	0.9	−0.1
Turnout		1,700	56.5	−2.7
Liberal Reform hold				

At the 1898 election Henry Chapman was elected as a Liberal Reform representative, while Daniel Levy had stood as an independent.

=== Elections in the 1890s ===
==== 1898 ====
1898 New South Wales colonial election: Sydney-Fitzroy
Party	Candidate	Votes	%	±%
Free Trade	Henry Chapman	815	51.2	
National Federal	John Norton	767	48.2	
Independent Federalist	Percy Tighe	5	0.3	
Ind. Free Trade	Daniel Levy	3	0.2	
Independent Federalist	Patrick Dorahy	1	0.1	
Total formal votes		1,591	99.1	
Informal votes		15	0.9	
Turnout		1,606	59.2	
Free Trade gain from Ind. Free Trade				

John McElhone (Independent Free Trade) died in 1898 and John Norton (National Federal) had won the seat in a by-election.

==== 1898 by-election ====
1898 Sydney-Fitzroy by-election
Party	Candidate	Votes	%	±%
Protectionist	John Norton	617	43.2	+43.2
Free Trade	Henry Chapman	546	38.2	+2.2
Protectionist	Patrick Dorahy	166	11.6	+11.6
Protectionist	William Martin	99	6.9	+6.9
Total formal votes		1,428	99.3	+0.0
Informal votes		10	0.7	+0.0
Turnout		1,438	66.7 (Note: Estimate based on a roll of 2,157 at the 1895 election.)	+3.4
Protectionist gain from Ind. Free Trade				

==== 1895 ====
1895 New South Wales colonial election: Sydney-Fitzroy
Party	Candidate	Votes	%	±%
Ind. Free Trade	John McElhone	624	46.0	
Free Trade	Henry Chapman	488	36.0	
Independent	Henry Harris	163	12.0	
Labour	Henry Cato	82	6.0	
Total formal votes		1,357	99.3	
Informal votes		9	0.7	
Turnout		1,366	63.3	
Ind. Free Trade gain from Free Trade				

==== 1894 ====
1894 New South Wales colonial election: Sydney-Fitzroy
Party	Candidate	Votes	%	±%
Free Trade	Henry Chapman	666	39.5	
Ind. Free Trade	John McElhone	422	25.0	
Labour	Henry Cato	355	21.1	
Ind. Free Trade	William Morrison	180	10.7	
Ind. Protectionist	Henry Foran	32	1.9	
Ind. Protectionist	Charles Forssberg	17	1.0	
Ind. Protectionist	Robert Roberts	13	0.8	
Total formal votes		1,685	98.7	
Informal votes		23	1.4	
Turnout		1,708	77.2	
Free Trade win		(new seat)		
