= 1871 Shoalhaven colonial by-election =

By-election in New South Wales, Australia

A by-election was held for the New South Wales Legislative Assembly electorate of Shoalhaven on 21 August 1871 because Thomas Garrett resigned to accept appointment as a police magistrate at Berrima.

== Dates ==
Date	Event
1 July 1871	Thomas Garratt resigned from parliament.
26 July 1871	Writ of election issued by the Speaker of the Legislative Assembly.
1 August 1871	Thomas Garrett appointed as a police magistrate.
21 August 1871	Nominations at Nowra.
28 August 1871	Polling day
2 October 1871	Return of writ

== Result ==
1871 Shoalhaven by-election Monday 21 August
Candidate	Votes	%
James Warden (elected)	Unopposed	

== See also ==
- Electoral results for the district of Shoalhaven
- List of New South Wales state by-elections
