= Justice: the people's paper =

English-language newspaper published in Narrabri, NSW, Australia

Front page of Justice : the people's paper, 5 December 1891

Justice : the people's paper was an English language newspaper published in Narrabri, New South Wales, Australia.

== Newspaper history ==
Justice : the people's paper was published in 1891 for a few months only. It was printed and published by Patrick Lyons for the proprietor, James Moylan, and was circulated through the Namoi, Gwydir and Gunnedah electorates of New South Wales. The paper made the claim to be "thoroughly independent ... purely original in tone, and a unique and remarkable innovation in country journalism. Honesty, straightforwardness, outspokenness and fearlessness are characteristics which it will ever preserve." It was sold for £1 per annum or 6d per issue.

== Digitisation ==
Justice : the people's paper has been digitised as part of the Australian Newspapers Digitisation Program of the National Library of Australia.

== See also ==
- List of newspapers in Australia
- List of newspapers in New South Wales
