= 1898 Sydney-Fitzroy colonial by-election =

← 1895	3 June 1898	July 1898 →

Electoral district of Sydney-Fitzroy in the New South Wales Legislative Assembly
- Registered: 2,157 (Note: Estimate based on a roll of 2,157 at the 1895 election.)
- Turnout: 66.7% (▲3.4)
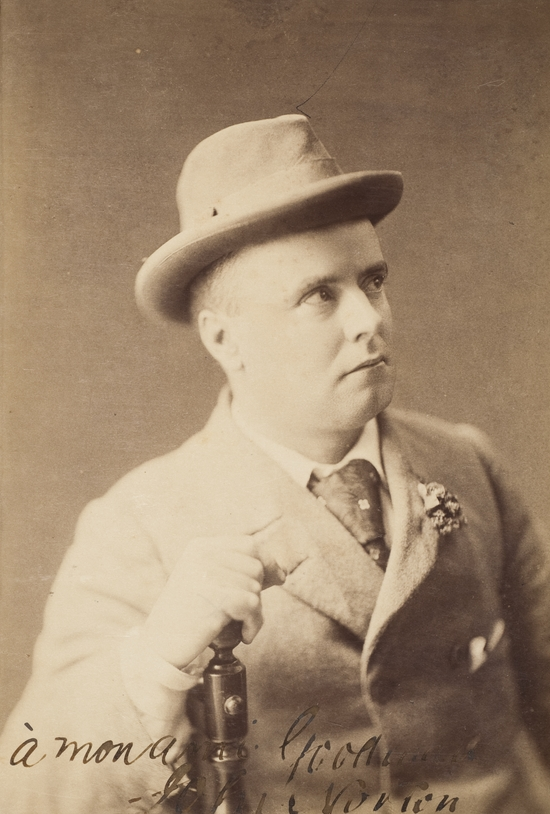
	First party	Second party
		FTP
Candidate	John Norton	Henry Chapman
Party	Protectionist	Free Trade
Popular vote	617	546
Percentage	43.2%	38.2%
Swing	▲43.2	▲2.2
MP before election
John McElhone
Ind. Free Trade
Elected MP
John Norton
Protectionist

The 1898 Sydney-Fitzroy colonial by-election was held on 3 June 1898 to elect the member for Sydney-Fitzroy in the New South Wales Legislative Assembly, following the death of Independent Free Trade MP John McElhone. The vote was held on the same day as a by-election in Narrabri and a statewide referendum on the subject of federation.

The by-election was won by Protectionist candidate John Norton, who defeated Free Trade candidate Henry Chapman and fellow Protectionist candidates Patrick Dorahy and William Martin. Norton lost the seat 54 days later at the New South Wales colonial election on 27 July 1898, when it was gained by Chapman with 51.2% of the vote.

== Key dates ==
- 6 May 1898 – John McElhone died
- 18 May 1898 – Writ of election issued by the Speaker of the Legislative Assembly
- 27 May 1898 – Candidate nominations
- 3 June 1898 – Election day
- 10 June 1898 – Return of writ

== Result ==
1898 Sydney-Fitzroy by-election
Party	Candidate	Votes	%	±%
Protectionist	John Norton	617	43.2	+43.2
Free Trade	Henry Chapman	546	38.2	+2.2
Protectionist	Patrick Dorahy	166	11.6	+11.6
Protectionist	William Martin	99	6.9	+6.9
Total formal votes		1,428	99.3	+0.0
Informal votes		10	0.7	+0.0
Turnout		1,438	66.7	+3.4
Protectionist gain from Ind. Free Trade				

== See also ==
- Electoral results for the district of Sydney-Fitzroy
- List of New South Wales state by-elections
