= Raymond Hamilton (politician) =

Australian politician

Personal details
- Born: 27 May 1909 Singleton, New South Wales
- Died: 11 June 1975 (aged 66) Inverell, New South Wales
- Party: Labor Party

Raymond George Hamilton (27 May 1909 – 6 November 1975) was an Australian politician and a member of the New South Wales Legislative Assembly between 1941 and 1950. He was a member of the Labor Party.

== Early life ==
Hamilton was born in Singleton, New South Wales and was the son of a mercer. He was educated at the Gunnedah High School and Sydney Church of England Grammar School and became an articled clerk to a firm of solicitors in Gunnedah. He also managed his father's Gunnedah Garden Theatre. He was admitted as a solicitor in 1940 and was the associate of Justice William Owen in 1941. He served with the Second Australian Imperial Force between 1941 and 1945 and attained the rank of lieutenant. Hamilton was called to the bar in 1945 and practiced in Sydney until 1953. He then developed and was a director of a number of concrete and other construction businesses. He also owned a number of cattle properties in the Nundle area. Hamilton was elected president of Nundle Shire Council between 1968 and 1972.

== State Parliament ==
Hamilton was elected to parliament as the Labor member for Namoi at the 1941 state election. He replaced the retiring Country Party member Colin Sinclair. At the election the Labor Party under William McKell made large gains in rural New South Wales, including Namoi and this was the basis of it gaining the majority in the Assembly and forming government. Hamilton retained the seat until it was abolished by a redistribution at the 1950 election. He then attempted to gain Labor pre-selection for the seat of Bankstown which the sitting member and Premier James McGirr had vacated to contest the new seat of Liverpool. He was easily defeated by Spence Powell. He did not hold party, parliamentary or ministerial offices and because of his army service, business interests and Sydney legal practice spent little time in his electorate.

New South Wales Legislative Assembly
Preceded by Colin Sinclair	Member for Namoi; 1941–1950	Succeeded by Seat abolished
