= John Roseby =

English-born Australian politician

John Roseby (1835 – 22 April 1898) was an English-born Australian politician.

He was born at Durham to monumental mason Thomas Roseby and Anne Lowes. The family moved to Australia in 1841, and Roseby followed his father as a monumental mason. In 1860 he married Ann Hooworth; they had twelve children. He was a Sydney City Councillor from 1870 to 1872. In 1877 he was elected to the New South Wales Legislative Assembly for Shoalhaven, serving until his defeat in 1882. He was bankrupted in 1885 and discharged in 1897. Roseby died in Sydney in 1898.

New South Wales Legislative Assembly
Preceded by James Warden	Member for Shoalhaven; 1877–1882	Succeeded by Frederick Humphery
