= Colin Sinclair (politician) =

Australian politician

The Honourable Sir Colin Sinclair KBE

Secretary for Lands
- In office 1 February 1938 – 6 November 1940
- Premier: Bertram Stevens; Alexander Mair
- Preceded by: Ernest Buttenshaw
- Succeeded by: Alfred Yeo

Member of the New South Wales Parliament for Namoi
- In office 11 June 1932 – 18 April 1941
- Preceded by: William Scully
- Succeeded by: Raymond Hamilton

Personal details
- Born: 24 December 1876 Inverell, Colony of New South Wales
- Died: 17 March 1956 (aged 79) Sydney, New South Wales, Australia
- Party: Progressive (to 1925); Country

Sir Colin Archibald Sinclair KBE (24 December 1876 – 17 March 1956) was an Australian politician.

== Early life ==
Sinclair was born in Inverell, New South Wales and educated at the New England Grammar School, Armidale and the University of Sydney (BA 1899, LLB 1905). He married Edith Grant in 1916.

Sinclair was elected as the member for Namoi in the New South Wales Legislative Assembly in 1932, and was Secretary for Lands from February 1938 to November 1940, when he resigned after suggestions that he had a conflict of interest, as a result of his recent appointment as a director of the Bank of New South Wales. He did not run for re-election in Namoi in 1941.

Sinclair was president of the Royal Agricultural Society of New South Wales from 1943 to 1954 and President of the Bank of New South Wales from 1952 to 1954. He also served as a president of the Australian Club. He died in Sydney. Sinclair was appointed a Knight Commander of the Order of the British Empire (KBE) in the 1953 New Year Honours.

New South Wales Legislative Assembly
Preceded by William Scully	Member for Namoi; 1932 – 1941	Succeeded by Raymond Hamilton
Political offices
Preceded by Ernest Buttenshaw	Secretary for Lands; 1938 – 1940	Succeeded by Alfred Yeo
Non-profit organization positions
Preceded by Sir Archibald Howie	President of the Royal Agricultural Society of New South Wales; 1943–1954	Succeeded by Sam Hordern
Business positions
Preceded by Sir Martin McIlrath	President of the Bank of New South Wales; 1952–1954	Succeeded by Sir Leslie Morshead
