= Frederick Humphery =

Australian politician

Frederick Thomas Humphery (16 September 1841 – 10 April 1908) was an Australian politician.

He was born at Oldbury near Berrima to settler Thomas Bott Humphery and Mary Ann Thorn. He attended private schools before becoming a commercial agent and estate manager. On 20 January 1875 he married Helena Annie King, with whom he had a son; a second marriage in 1881 to Lucy Alice Matilda King produced two daughters. In 1882 he was elected to the New South Wales Legislative Assembly for Shoalhaven, serving until his retirement in 1887. In 1888 he was appointed to the New South Wales Legislative Council, where he remained until his death in Sydney in 1908.

New South Wales Legislative Assembly
Preceded by John Roseby	Member for Shoalhaven; 1882–1887	Succeeded by William Martin
