= Albert Collins (politician) =

Australian politician

Albert Ernest Collins (11 March 1868 – 22 July 1956) was an Australian politician.

He was born at Goulburn to broker Joseph Collins and Priscilla Israel. He attended Crown Street Public School but left at fourteen to be apprenticed to a chemist in Narrabri. He then worked in his brother's store, becoming a manager in 1886 and sole proprietor in 1898. From 1894 to 1901 he was an alderman at Narrabri, serving as mayor from 1898 to 1901. In 1901 he was elected to the New South Wales Legislative Assembly as the Liberal member for Narrabri. He transferred to Namoi as an Independent Liberal in 1904 and retired from politics in 1910. Collins died at Killara in 1956.

New South Wales Legislative Assembly
Preceded by Hugh Ross	Member for Narrabri; 1901–1904	Abolished
New seat	Member for Namoi; 1904–1910	Succeeded by George Black
