= John Garrett (Australian politician) =

Australian politician

John Garrett (1805 – 21 May 1885) was an English-born Australian politician.

He was born at Whitehaven to mariner Thomas Garrett and Jane Ruddick. Around 1827 he married Sarah Stafford, with whom he had eleven children. A painter and plumber, he migrated to Australia in 1840, and eventually became a newspaper proprietor, running the Alpine Pioneer and the Kiandra Advertiser. In 1859 he was elected to the New South Wales Legislative Assembly for Shoalhaven, serving until his resignation to become a police magistrate at Scone in 1861. Garrett died at Woollahra in 1885.

Thomas Garrett, one of his sons, was also a member of the Legislative Assembly, as member for Monaro, Shoalhaven and Camden.

New South Wales Legislative Assembly
New seat	Member for Shoalhaven; 1859–1861	Succeeded by John Robertson
