= Tom Dangar =

Australian politician (1829–1890)

Thomas Gordon Gibbons Dangar (27 November 1829 – 4 July 1890) was a squatter and politician in the Colony of New South Wales.

He was born in Sydney, the son of cooper Matthew John Gibbons and Charlotte Selina Hutchinson. His father died while he was very young and his mother married Thomas Dangar, who raised the younger Thomas as his own son. He was educated at Sydney College, but did not read for the bar due to illness and became a squatter around the Liverpool Plains. In 1847 he moved to the New England district and became one of the area's pioneers, eventually settling at Bullerawa on the Namoi River around 1850. He married Catherine Annabella Mackenzie, with whom he had a son.

In 1865 he was elected to the New South Wales Legislative Assembly as the member for Gwydir. He transferred to Namoi in 1880, and in 1885 unsuccessfully attempted to transfer back to Gwydir, losing his seat. He returned to the Assembly in 1887 as the Free Trade member for Namoi, and held the seat until his death at Petersham on 4 July 1890 (aged 60).

New South Wales Legislative Assembly
Preceded by Francis Rusden	Member for Gwydir; 1864–1880	Succeeded by William Campbell
New seat	Member for Namoi; 1880–1885	Succeeded by Charles Collins
Preceded by Charles Collins	Member for Namoi; 1887–1890	Succeeded by Charles Collins
