= James Warden (politician) =

Scottish-born Australian politician

James Warden (1 March 1820 – 24 October 1904) was a Scottish-born Australian politician.

He was born at Kirriemuir in Forfarshire. He was orphaned at a young age and became a ship's carpenter at Dundee. Around 1844 he arrived at Hobart and then went to New South Wales, settling at Ulladulla where he became a ship builder. He married Sarah Gates around 1850; they had five children. In 1855 he turned to farming, purchasing the Boolgata estate in the pioneer settlement of Yatte Yattah (north or present day Milton). He was an Ulladulla alderman and served several times as mayor. In 1871 he was elected to the New South Wales Legislative Assembly for Shoalhaven, serving until his retirement in 1877. Warden died at Boolgata in 1904. His nephew, Winter Warden, served in the New South Wales Legislative Council.

New South Wales Legislative Assembly
Preceded by Thomas Garrett	Member for Shoalhaven; 1871–1877	Succeeded by John Roseby
