= Electoral district of Namoi =

Former state electoral district of New South Wales, Australia

Namoi, known as The Namoi until 1910 was an electoral district of the Legislative Assembly in the Australian state of New South Wales, created in 1880 and named after the Namoi River. It elected two members between 1891 and 1894. In 1894 it was abolished and partly replaced by Narrabri. In 1904, with the downsizing of the Legislative Assembly after Federation, Namoi was recreated, replacing Narrabri and part of Gunnedah. Between 1920 and 1927, it largely absorbed Gwydir and Tamworth and elected three members under proportional representation. In 1927, it was replaced by single-member electorates, mainly Namoi, Tamworth and Barwon. Namoi was abolished in 1950.

== Members for Namoi ==
Single-member (1880–1891)
Member	Party	Term						
Thomas Dangar	None	1880–1885						
Charles Collins	None	1885–1887						
Thomas Dangar	Free Trade	1887–1890						
Charles Collins	Free Trade	1890–1891						
Two members (1891–1894)
Member	Party	Term	Member	Party	Term			
Charles Collins	Free Trade	1891–1894	Job Sheldon	Labour	1891–1894			
Single-member (1904–1920)
Member	Party	Term						
Albert Collins	Independent Liberal	1904–1910						
George Black	Labor	1910–1916						
George Black	Independent Labor	1916–1917						
Walter Wearne	Ind. Nationalist	1917–1920						
Three members (1920–1927)
Member	Party	Term	Member	Party	Term	Member	Party	Term
Walter Wearne	Progressive	1920–1922	Frank Chaffey	Nationalist	1920–1927	Patrick Scully	Labor	1920–1923
Walter Wearne	Nationalist	1922–1927	Frank Chaffey	Nationalist	1920–1927	Patrick Scully	Labor	1920–1923
Walter Wearne	Nationalist	1922–1927	Frank Chaffey	Nationalist	1920–1927	William Scully	Labor	1923–1927
Single-member (1927–1950)
Member	Party	Term						
William Scully	Labor	1927–1932						
Colin Sinclair	Country	1932–1941						
Raymond Hamilton	Labor	1941–1950						

== Election results ==
1947 New South Wales state election: Namoi
Party	Candidate	Votes	%	±%
Labor	Raymond Hamilton	6,634	51.2	−8.4
Country	Malcolm Heath	6,313	48.8	+8.4
Total formal votes		12,947	99.1	+0.7
Informal votes		111	0.9	−0.7
Turnout		13,058	95.0	+7.4
Labor hold		Swing	−8.4	
