= Electoral district of Sydney-Bligh =

Former state electoral district of New South Wales, Australia

Sydney-Bligh was an electoral district of the Legislative Assembly in the Australian state of New South Wales, in central Sydney, created in 1894, with the abolition of the multi-member district of East Sydney and named after naval officer and colonial administrator William Bligh. It was in the Darlinghurst area, bounded by Riley Street, William Street, King's Cross Road, Bayswater Road, Neild Avenue, Boundary Street and Oxford Street. It was abolished in 1904 and partly replaced by the electoral district of Darlinghurst.

== Members for Sydney-Bligh ==
Member	Party	Term
James Martin	Free Trade	1894–1895
James Harvey	Free Trade	1895–1898
Patrick Quinn	National Federal	1898–1901
Patrick Quinn	Progressive	1901–1904

== Election results ==
1901 New South Wales state election: Sydney-Bligh
Party	Candidate	Votes	%	±%
Progressive	Patrick Quinn	781	49.7	−4.9
Liberal Reform	John Brindley	604	38.4	−5.6
Independent	John Hughes	85	5.4	
Labour	Daniel Healey	76	4.8	
Independent Liberal	John Campbell	27	1.7	
Total formal votes		1,573	99.8	+1.0
Informal votes		3	0.2	−1.0
Turnout		1,576	56.4	+2.9
Progressive hold				
