= Philip Morton (politician) =

Australian politician (1862–1932)

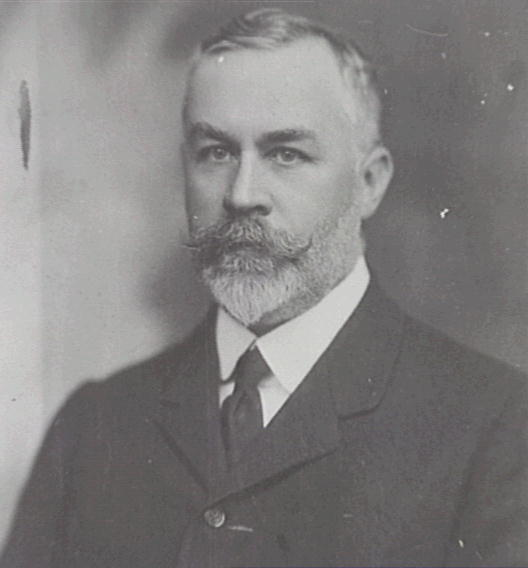
Philip Henry Morton

Philip Henry Morton (1862 – 24 April 1932) was an Australian politician.

He was born near Nowra to Henry Gordon Morton and Jane Fairlies. He attended Numbaa Public School and became an estate manager. In 1889 he was elected to the New South Wales Legislative Assembly as the Free Trade member for Shoalhaven. He was defeated in 1898 as a Federalist candidate, and later served from 1904 to 1908 on Sydney City Council. His brothers Mark, and Henry, were also members of the Legislative Assembly. Morton died in Sydney in 1932.

New South Wales Legislative Assembly
Preceded by William Martin	Member for Shoalhaven; 1889–1898	Succeeded by David Davis
