= Patrick Quinn (Australian politician) =

Australian politician

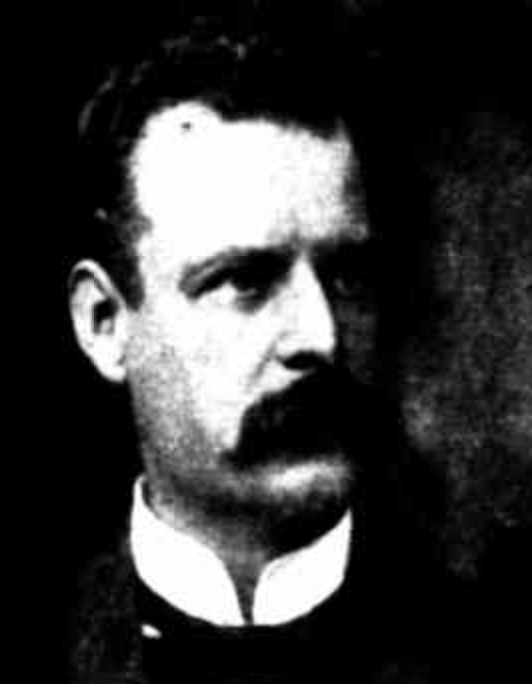
- Quinn in 1898

Member of the New South Wales Parliament for Sydney-Bligh
- In office 27 July 1898 – 16 July 1904
- Preceded by: James Harvey
- Succeeded by: Seat abolished

Personal details
- Born: 1862 Darlinghurst, Sydney
- Died: 2 April 1926 (aged 63–64) Manly, New South Wales
- Party: Protectionist Party
- Spouse: Julia Bourke (1888–1926)
- Relations: Roderic Quinn (brother, poet)
- Children: 1 daughter
- Profession: Journalist

Patrick Edward Quinn (1862 – 2 April 1926) was an Australian politician.

Born in Darlinghurst to postal officer Edward Quinn and Catherine McCarty (d. August 1900), he attended Marist Brothers School and Fort Street Public School in Sydney. He had two sisters, Nora and Frances, and brother Roderic Joseph.

Quinn began studying law but instead chose journalism as a career and edited a newspaper at Narrabri for twenty years. Later he was involved with the Illustrated Sydney News and The Daily Telegraph. Similar to his poet brother Roderic, Quinn also held an interest in versifying. He contributed lyrics to the cantata Captain Cook, written by John A. Delany. He married Julia Bourke in 1888, with whom he had one daughter. In 1898 he was elected to the New South Wales Legislative Assembly as the Protectionist member for Sydney-Bligh, serving until 1904; he was subsequently Deputy Trade Commissioner for New South Wales in the United States from 1912 to 1917.

Quinn died at Manly in 1926 following several weeks illness, leaving a widow and daughter Marjorie. He is buried at the Manly cemetery.

== Bibliography ==
=== Novel ===
- The Jewelled Belt: A Detective Story (1896)

=== Poetry collection ===
- Selected Poems edited by Marjorie Quinn (1970)

=== Short story collection ===
- The Australian Story-teller for an Idle Afternoon (1896)

New South Wales Legislative Assembly
Preceded by James Harvey	Member for Sydney-Bligh; 1898–1904	Abolished
