= Job Sheldon =

Australian politician

Member of Parliament for Electoral district of The Namoi
- In office 26 June 1891 – 25 June 1894

Personal details
- Born: 12 June 1847 Tranmere, Cheshire, England
- Died: 28 September 1914 (aged 67) Petersham, New South Wales
- Party: Labor Party
- Occupation: Politician, land agent

Job Sheldon (1847 – 28 September 1914) was an English-born Australian politician and businessman based at Narrabri, in the north-west slopes of New South Wales.

After settling at Narrabri in the mid-1880s Sheldon worked as a land agent and newspaper proprietor. As a supporter of workers' rights and unionism, in June 1891 Sheldon was amongst the initial group of Labor Party members elected to the New South Wales Legislative Assembly (representing the electorate of The Namoi). He was an advocate for protectionism and refused to sign Labor's solidarity pledge binding members of parliament to caucus decisions. In 1894 Sheldon ran unsuccessfully as a Protectionist Party candidate for the Gunnedah electorate.

== Biography ==
=== Early life ===
Job Sheldon was born on 12 June 1847 at Tranmere (a suburb of Birkenhead on the Wirral Peninsula) in county Cheshire, England, the son of James Sheldon and Elizabeth (née Stafford). His father's occupation was recorded as a medical practitioner.

Young Job was educated "at a private academy in Bexley, Kent". One account of Sheldon's early life records that "family reverses caused him to face the world at an early age".

In about 1863, when he aged sixteen, Sheldon enlisted as a "private soldier" in the Grenadier Guards, the most senior infantry regiment of the British Army. Soon afterwards he was promoted to the rank of assistant schoolmaster in the regiment. In his later life Sheldon was described as having a "tall and upright military figure", carrying the hallmark of his period with the Grenadier Guards "throughout his life".

Job Sheldon and Eliza Sophia Bouchard were married on 15 July 1869 at St. Mary's church, Lambeth, county Surrey.

In April 1881 Sheldon and his wife and family were lodging at 65 Dieppe Street, Chelsea, London. Sheldon's occupation was recorded as "London School Board Officer". By that stage Job and Eliza Sheldon had three children, Rose aged ten, Lizzie aged eight and John aged six.

Sheldon's wife, Eliza Sophia Sheldon, died in about November 1881 at Chelsea, London.

=== Immigration ===
Job Sheldon travelled from London to Australia aboard the S.S. Iberia, arriving at Sydney in the colony of New South Wales on 21 December 1883. His children had remained in England. For about a year after arriving in Australia Sheldon lived with his uncle, Joseph Stafford, at Muswellbrook in the Upper Hunter district of New South Wales.

In June 1884 Sheldon deposited the sum of two pounds to be paid "to the person under whose charge" his children were to be placed on the voyage from England to Australia. His three children – Rose, Lizzie and John – travelled to Australia aboard the S.S. Abergeldie, which arrived at Sydney in December 1884.

In 1885 Sheldon and his three children settled at Narrabri (where his first cousin Albert R. Stafford was living). He worked as a "confidential clerk" for the firm of Barry and Stafford, storekeepers of Narrabri.

By 1888 Sheldon was working as a land agent at Narrabri.

Job Sheldon and Harriett Emily Halls were married on 5 August 1890 at Granville, a suburb in western Sydney. The couple had two children, a daughter who died as an infant and a son (born in 1893).

=== Political career ===
The early 1890s were years of an economic depression and industrial turmoil in Australia. The maritime dispute that began in August 1890 eventually involved ten unions in New South Wales, including the Shearers' Union, and spread to unionists in three other colonies. The dispute began when shipowners refused to allow the Mercantile Marine Officers' Association to affiliate with the Melbourne Trades Hall Council, but it rapidly escalated into a series of strike actions involving wharf laborers, seamen, coal miners, and shearers across Australia and New Zealand. An estimated fifty thousand workers struck over the principles of the 'closed shop' versus employers' 'freedom of contract'.

In February 1891 shearers at 'Jondaryan' station on the Darling Downs went on strike after refusing to work alongside non-unionised workers. The strike spread quickly in the following months in central Queensland and into New South Wales, but the shearers' unions were hampered by a lack of funds, significant opposition from pastoralists' unions and the prosecution of union leaders by the Queensland government.

Sheldon took "great interest in the labor question" from when he began living at Narrabri. In July 1891 it was recorded that during the "late strike" he "wrote very largely on the subject in the local papers and warmly supported the shearers in their movement".

In 1891 the local branch of the Labor Electoral League elected Sheldon "unanimously" as their candidate for the upcoming general election. He was described as "a fluent speaker and forcible".

The 1891 general election in New South Wales, held in June and early July 1891, saw the first electoral successes of the Labor Party (then known as the Labor Electoral League of New South Wales). Job Sheldon was selected as a Labor Electoral League candidate, to contest the electorate of The Namoi in the New South Wales Legislative Assembly, a jurisdiction returning two members of parliament. A total of three candidates were nominated. The elected members for The Namoi electorate were Sheldon (995 votes) and the sitting member Charles Collins (825 votes). Collins declared himself an independent member (though with free trade convictions).

At a sitting of the Legislative Assembly on 21 July 1891 Sheldon asked the premier, Sir Henry Parkes, whether the government was prepared, "in view of the disturbed relations between shearers and squatters", to bring forward legislation for the establishment of a court for the settlement of industrial disputes. Parkes replied that the government "did not feel justified at that stage in making any alteration in their programme laid down".

In September 1891 Sheldon received a letter, containing 116 signatures of members of the Moree branch of the Amalgamated Shearers' Union of Australasia, thanking him for his "strenuous efforts", after being elected to parliament, in attempting "to bring about a conference between the representatives of the shearers and the pastoralists' unions".

After the electoral successes of 1891 the Labor party sought to develop the means of enforcing solidarity amongst its parliamentary members. At the Labor party's third annual conference in March 1894 it was agreed to enforce the solidarity pledge requiring parliamentary members to vote strictly as a unified group based on majority caucus decisions. In April 1894 the majority of Labor members of the Legislative Assembly, including Sheldon and the parliamentary leader Joseph Cook, refused to sign the 'caucus pledge', resulting in a split in the New South Wales Labor Electoral League. James McGowen, one of only three members who signed the pledge, succeeded Cook as parliamentary leader. It was said that Sheldon "rebelled against the caucus pledge" and that he had been "a rebel against Caucus domination from the start".

In September 1893 the Electoral Districts Commissioners presented their scheme of redistribution of seats under the new Electoral Act before the New South Wales Legislative Assembly. As part of the process, multi-member electorates were abolished and the electorates were realigned and in some cases renamed. The Namoi electorate was abolished with sections added to the existing Gunnedah and newly-created Moree electorates.

At the July 1894 general election Sheldon contested the Gunnedah electorate against the sitting Labor member, John Kirkpatrick. Sheldon was nominated as a candidate of the Protectionist Party and campaigned on his opposition to "the single tax". In addition to Kirkpatrick and Sheldon there were three other candidates (two independent free trade supporters and one independent protectionist supporter). At the election held on 17 July 1894 Kirkpatrick topped the poll with 672 votes (59.4 percent), with Sheldon in second place with 357 votes (31.5 percent).

=== Post-politics ===
In August 1894 the Narrabri solicitor, George S.E. Dale, established the Narrabri Age newspaper, of which Job Sheldon was appointed editor. The journal was described as "a cleanly-printed and readable paper... run on Protectionist lines". Soon afterwards Sheldon became a partner in the business.

After his parliamentary term ended Sheldon resumed working as a land agent at Narrabri and surrounding districts.

In July 1913 Sheldon was appointed deputy sergeant-at-arms of the New South Wales Legislative Assembly. On appointment he became the acting sergeant-at-arms, replacing William S. Christie who was absent due to ill-health. Christie returned to his role as sergeant-at-arms in early November 1913.

In the months before his death Sheldon advertised his services as a "land, mining and investment agency", located in Castlereagh Street, Sydney.

Job Sheldon died on 28 September 1914, aged 67, at Petersham in Sydney. He had been "ill for some weeks with double pneumonia". The cause of his death was recorded as "bronchitis, pleurisy with effusion, cyanosis and cardiac failure".

New South Wales Legislative Assembly
Preceded by Charles Collins	Member for Namoi; 1891–1894; Served alongside: Charles Collins	Abolished
