= David Davis (New South Wales politician) =

Australian politician

David Davis (1 February 1854 – 6 July 1927) was an Australian politician.

He was born on Norfolk Island, and moved to Victoria around 1859. In 1875, he moved to Sydney, where he was a builder; his buildings included three public libraries, the Government Printing Office and Macquarie Lighthouse.

On 29 November 1879, he married Elizabeth Anne Valley, with whom he had six children. He was an alderman and mayor of Woollahra, and in 1898 was elected to the New South Wales Legislative Assembly as the Independent Federalist member for Shoalhaven. He was defeated in 1901. Davis died at Double Bay in 1927.

New South Wales Legislative Assembly
Preceded by Philip Morton	Member for Shoalhaven; 1898–1901	Succeeded by Mark Morton
