= James Harvey (Australian politician) =

Australian politician

James Frederick Harvey (died 1912) was an Australian politician.

Harvey was the managing proprietor of the Country Milk Company and served as treasurer of the Royal Agricultural Society for a number of years. He was the Free Trade member for Sydney-Bligh from 1895 to 1898. The Sunday Times described him as "popular, though obtrusive". He was defeated by Patrick Quinn in 1898. Few further biographical details are known, although he died in San Francisco in 1912.

New South Wales Legislative Assembly
Preceded by James Martin	Member for Sydney-Bligh; 1895–1898	Succeeded by Patrick Quinn
