= Electoral district of Sydney-Fitzroy =

Former state electoral district of New South Wales, Australia

Sydney-Fitzroy was an electoral district of the Legislative Assembly in the Australian state of New South Wales, created in 1894 from part of East Sydney in inner Sydney including Woolloomooloo, Potts Point and Elizabeth Bay, and bounded by Riley Street, William Street, King's Cross Road, Bayswater Road and Port Jackson. It was named after Governor FitzRoy. It was abolished in 1904 and partly replaced by Darlinghurst.

== Members for Sydney-Fitzroy ==
Member	Party	Term
Henry Chapman	Free Trade	1894–1895
John McElhone	Ind. Free Trade	1895–1898
John Norton	Protectionist	1898–1898
Henry Chapman	Free Trade	1898–1901
Daniel Levy	Liberal Reform	1901–1904

== Election results ==
1901 New South Wales state election: Sydney-Fitzroy
Party	Candidate	Votes	%	±%
Liberal Reform	Daniel Levy	605	35.9	
Independent Liberal	Arthur McElhone	381	22.6	
Independent	Henry Chapman	379	22.5	
Labour	Donald McKinnon	121	7.2	
Ind. Progressive	Harry Foran	108	6.4	
Independent	Denis O'Sullivan	71	4.2	
Independent	Callaghan Garvan	20	1.2	
Total formal votes		1,685	99.1	+0.1
Informal votes		15	0.9	−0.1
Turnout		1,700	56.5	−2.7
Liberal Reform hold				

At the 1898 election Henry Chapman was elected as a Liberal Reform representative, while Daniel Levy had stood as an independent.
