= Hugh Ross (Australian politician) =

Australian politician

Hugh Murdoch Ross (8 July 1846 – 7 July 1912) was an Australian politician.

He was born at Murrurundi to wheelwright John Ross and Mary Mackay. He was a farmer who also worked as a stock inspector, a postmaster and poundkeeper at Quirindi, and as clerk and secretary of the Carriers/Teamster Union at Narrabri. On 20 April 1874 he married Caroline O'Neile, with whom he would have nine children. He was elected to the New South Wales Legislative Assembly in 1898 as the Labor member for Narrabri. Defeated in 1901, Ross died in Sydney in 1912.

New South Wales Legislative Assembly
Preceded by Charles Collins	Member for Narrabri; 1898–1901	Succeeded by Albert Collins
