= Henry Chapman (New South Wales politician) =

Australian politician

Henry Chapman (1846 – 20 August 1930) was an Irish-born Australian politician.

He was born in County Cork to policeman William Edward Chapman and Margaret Meaney. In 1869 he arrived in New South Wales, and on 27 October 1870 he married Mary Jane Chapman, his cousin, with whom he had six children. He worked as a grocer and tea merchant, and also joined the Field Artillery in 1870, becoming a major in 1890. From 1889 to 1900 he served on Sydney City Council representing Fitzroy Ward. In 1894 he was elected to the New South Wales Legislative Assembly as the Free Trade member for Sydney-Fitzroy. Defeated in 1895, he was returned in 1898 before being defeated once more (as an independent) in 1901. Chapman returned to his grocery business before retiring in 1917. He died in Manly in 1930, aged 84–85.

New South Wales Legislative Assembly
| New seat | Member for Sydney-Fitzroy; 1894–1895 | Succeeded by John McElhone |
| Preceded by John Norton | Member for Sydney-Fitzroy; 1898–1901 | Succeeded by Daniel Levy |
