= Electoral district of Narrabri =

Former state electoral district of New South Wales, Australia

Narrabri was an electoral district of the Legislative Assembly in the Australian state of New South Wales. It was created in 1894, largely replacing Namoi and including Narrabri. It was abolished in 1904, following the 1903 New South Wales referendum, which required the number of members of the Legislative Assembly to be reduced from 125 to 90. and was largely replaced by a recreated Namoi.

== Members for Narrabri ==
Member	Party	Period
Charles Collins	Free Trade	1894–1898
Hugh Ross	Labour	1898–1901
Albert Collins	Liberal Reform	1901–1904

== Election results ==
1901 New South Wales state election: Narrabri
Party	Candidate	Votes	%	±%
Liberal Reform	Albert Collins	738	51.2	
Labour	John Gately	520	36.1	−4.6
Ind. Progressive	Job Sheldon	184	12.8	
Total formal votes		1,442	99.7	+1.4
Informal votes		5	0.4	−1.4
Turnout		1,447	60.2	+1.6
Liberal Reform gain from Labour				

The sitting member was Hugh Ross (Labour) who unsuccessfully contested Quirindi.
