= Charles Collins (New South Wales politician) =

Australian politician

Charles Collins (12 May 1850 – 15 April 1898) was a merchant and politician in the Colony of New South Wales.

He was born in Goulburn to Joseph Collins and Lydia Marks. He received a Jewish education locally, and was apprenticed to a merchant around 1865. In 1867 he became a clerk at Narrabri, eventually becoming store manager and then, from 1873, owner of his own store. He later expanded his business to include stores in Walgett, Pilliga and Wee Waa. He was also a Narrabri alderman and served as the town's first mayor. In 1885 he was elected to the New South Wales Legislative Assembly as the member for Namoi, but he retired after a single term. He returned to the Assembly in 1890 via a by-election, switching to the seat of Narrabri in 1894, which he held until his death. He was a supporter of free trade, and while a member of the Free Trade Party, mostly confined himself to issues affecting his electorate. He did not hold ministerial or parliamentary office.

He died at Tamworth on 12 April 1898 (aged 47).

New South Wales Legislative Assembly
Preceded by Tom Dangar	Member for Namoi; 1885 – 1887	Succeeded by Tom Dangar
Preceded by Tom Dangar	Member for Namoi; 1890 – 1894; With: None / Job Sheldon	District abolished
New district	Member for Narrabri; 1894 – 1898	Succeeded by Hugh Ross
