= Electoral district of Shoalhaven =

Former state electoral district of New South Wales, Australia

Shoalhaven was an electoral district for the Legislative Assembly in the Australian state of New South Wales from 1859 to 1904. It included the lower part of the Shoalhaven valley. It replaced parts of Eastern Camden and St Vincent. It was replaced by Allowrie.

== Members for Shoalhaven ==
Member	Party	Period
John Garrett	None	1859–1861
John Robertson	None	1862–1864
Thomas Garrett	None	1864–1871
James Warden	None	1871–1877
John Roseby	None	1877–1882
Frederick Humphery	None	1882–1887
William Fraser Martin	Free Trade	1887–1889
Philip Morton	Free Trade	1889–1895
Philip Morton	Ind. Free Trade	1895–1898
David Davis	Ind. Protectionist	1898–1901
Mark Morton	Liberal Reform	1901–1904

== Election results ==
1901 New South Wales state election: The Shoalhaven
Party	Candidate	Votes	%	±%
Liberal Reform	Mark Morton	927	55.5	
Progressive	David Davis	742	44.5	−11.5
Total formal votes		1,669	99.2	−0.1
Informal votes		14	0.8	+0.1
Turnout		1,683	83.7	+22.0
Liberal Reform gain from Ind. Progressive				
