= Members of the New South Wales Legislative Assembly, 1895–1898 =

This is a list of members of the New South Wales Legislative Assembly who served in the 17th parliament of New South Wales from 1895 to 1898. They were elected at the 1895 colonial election on 24 July 1895. The Speaker was Sir Joseph Abbott.

Name	Party (Note: The party designation is the designation given at the time of election but party affiliations were particularly flexible during the pre-federation period in the New South Wales Parliament.)	Electorate	Term in office
Sir Joseph Abbott	Protectionist	Wentworth	1880–1901
William Affleck	Free Trade	Yass	1894–1904
George Anderson	Free Trade	Waterloo	1894–1904
James Ashton	Free Trade	Hay	1894–1907
Richard Ball	Free Trade	Albury	1895–1898 1904–1937
John Barnes	Protectionist	Gundagai	1889–1904
Thomas Bavister	Free Trade	Ashfield	1891–1898
George Black	Labour	Sydney-Gipps	1891–1898 1910–1917
Herbert Brown	Protectionist	Durham	1875–1898
Thomas Brown	Labour	Condoublin	1894–1901 1913–1917
James Brunker	Free Trade	East Maitland	1880–1904
Charles Bull	Free Trade	Camden	1895–1898
Angus Cameron ^{3}	Free Trade	Waverley	1874–1889 1894–1896
Alexander Campbell	Protectionist	Kiama	1894–1904
Archibald Campbell	Free Trade	Illawarra	1891–1903
John Cann	Labour	Broken Hill	1891–1916
James Carroll ^{5}	Protectionist	Lachlan	1894–1904
Joseph Carruthers	Free Trade	St George	1887–1908
John Chanter	Protectionist	Deniliquin	1885–1901
Austin Chapman	Protectionist	Braidwood	1891–1901
Edward Clark	Free Trade	St Leonards	1891–1904 1907–1910
Francis Clarke	Protectionist	Hastings and Macleay	1893–1898 1900–1901
Henry Clarke	Ind. Protectionist	Bega	1869–1894, 1895–1904
Charles Collins ^{6}	Free Trade	Narrabri	1885–1887 1890–1898
Joseph Cook	Free Trade	Hartley	1891–1901
Henry Copeland ^{2}	Protectionist	Sydney-Phillip	1877–1883, 1883–1895, 1895–1900
Francis Cotton	Free Trade	Newtown-Camperdown	1891–1901
Paddy Crick	Protectionist	West Macquarie	1889–1906
George Cruickshank	Protectionist	Inverell	1889–1901
John Dacey	Labour	Botany	1895–1912
Thomas Davis	Labour	Sydney-Pyrmont	1891–1898
William Dick	Free Trade	Newcastle East	1894–1907
Denis Donnelly ^{4}	Protectionist	Cowra	1891–1896
Alfred Edden	Labour	Kahibah	1891–1920
Thomas Ewing	Protectionist	Lismore	1885–1901
Frank Farnell	Free Trade	Ryde	1887–1898 1901–1903
John Fegan	Free Trade	Wickham	1891–1907 1920–1922
William Ferguson	Labour	Sturt	1894–1904
Robert Fitzgerald	Protectionist	Robertson	1885–1901
John Fitzpatrick ^{1}	Free Trade	Rylstone	1895–1904 1907–1930
Thomas Fitzpatrick	Protectionist	Murrumbidgee	1894–1904
Jacob Garrard	Free Trade	Sherbrooke	1880–1898
John Gillies	Free Trade	West Maitland	1891–1911
Thomas Goodwin	Protectionist	Gunnedah	1887–1888, 1895–1901
James Gormly	Protectionist	Wagga Wagga	1885–1904
Albert Gould	Free Trade	Singleton	1882–1898
James Graham	Free Trade	Sydney-Belmore	1894–1901 1907–1910
George Greene	Ind. Free Trade	Grenfell	1889–1891 1894 1895–1898
Arthur Griffith	Labour	Waratah	1894–1903 1904–1920
Matthew Harris	Free Trade	Sydney-Denison	1894–1901
James Harvey	Free Trade	Sydney-Bligh	1895–1898
Thomas Hassall	Protectionist	Moree	1886–1901
John Hawthorne	Free Trade	Leichhardt	1885–1891 1894–1904
James Hayes	Protectionist	Murray	1885–1904
John Haynes	Free Trade	Wellington	1887–1904 1915–1917
James Hogue	Free Trade	Glebe	1894–1910
Leslie Hollis	Free Trade	Goulburn	1891–1898
George Howarth	Free Trade	Willoughby	1895–1903
Billy Hughes	Labour	Sydney-Lang	1894–1901
William Hurley	Protectionist	Macquarie	1895–1904
Thomas Jessep ^{3}	Free Trade	Waverley	1896–1907
Llewellyn Jones	Free Trade	Petersham	1894–1898
Robert Jones	Free Trade	Mudgee	1891–1998 1907–1910
Travers Jones	Protectionist	Tumut	1885–1891 1894–1898
Joseph Kelly	Protectionist	Tweed	1894–1898
Adrian Knox	Free Trade	Woollahra	1894–1898
Sydney Law	Labour	Balmain South	1894–1907
Charles Lee	Free Trade	Tenterfield	1884–1920
Robert Levien	Protectionist	Quirindi	1880–1889, 1889–1913
Edmund Lonsdale	Free Trade	Armidale	1891–1894 1895–1898 1901–1903 1907–1913
William Lyne	Protectionist	Hume	1880–1901
Hugh Macdonald	Labour	Coonamble	1894–1906
Kenneth Mackay	Protectionist	Boorowa	1895–1899
William Mahony	Free Trade	Annandale	1894–1910
William McCourt	Free Trade	Bowral	1882–1885 1887–1913
John McElhone ^{7}	Ind. Free Trade	Sydney-Fitzroy	1875–1889 1895–1898
John McFarlane	Protectionist	Clarence	1887–1915
James McGowen	Labour	Redfern	1891–1917
John McLaughlin	Ind. Protectionist	Raleigh	1880–1885 1895–1901
Francis McLean	Free Trade	Marrickville	1894–1901
William McMillan	Free Trade	Burwood	1887–1898
Dick Meagher ^{2}	Protectionist	Sydney-Phillip	1895 1898–1904 1907–1917
William Millard	Free Trade	Moruya	1894–1920 1920–1921
Edward Millen	Free Trade	Bourke	1894–1898
Gus Miller	Protectionist	Monaro	1889–1918
Edmund Molesworth	Free Trade	Newtown-Erskine	1889–1901
Samuel Moore	Free Trade	Bingara	1885–1910
William Morgan	Free Trade	Hawkesbury	1894–1901
Philip Morton	Ind. Free Trade	Shoalhaven	1889–1898
John Neild	Ind. Free Trade	Paddington	1885–1889 1891–1894 1895–1901
Arthur Nelson	Protectionist	Sydney-Flinders	1895–1904
Harry Newman	Free Trade	Orange	1891–1904
John Nicholson	Labour	Woronora	1891–1917
John Norton ^{7}	Protectionist	Sydney-Fitzroy	1898–1906 1907–1910
Dowell O'Reilly	Free Trade	Parramatta	1894–1898
Edward O'Sullivan	Protectionist	Queanbeyan	1885–1910
Varney Parkes	Free Trade	Canterbury	1885–1888, 1891–1900 1907–1913
John Perry	Protectionist	Ballina	1889–1920
Michael Phillips ^{4}	Protectionist	Cowra	1896–1898
Simeon Phillips	Free Trade	Dubbo	1895–1904
Albert Piddington	Free Trade	Tamworth	1895–1898
William Henry Piddington	Free Trade	Uralla-Walcha	1894–1900
Richard Price	Protectionist	Gloucester	1894–1904 1907–1922
Robert Pyers	Protectionist	Richmond	1894–1904
George Reid	Free Trade	Sydney-King	1880–1884 1885–1901
Joseph Reymond	Protectionist	Ashburnham	1895–1904
William Rigg	Free Trade	Newtown-St Peters	1894–1901
Thomas Rose	Protectionist	Argyle	1891–1904
Andrew Ross	Protectionist	Molong	1880–1904
Hugh Ross ^{6}	Labour	Narrabri	1898–1901
William Schey	Protectionist	Darlington	1887–1898
John See	Protectionist	Grafton	1880–1904
Richard Sleath	Labour	Wilcannia	1894–1904
George Smailes	Labour	Granville	1895–1898
Sydney Smith	Free Trade	Bathurst	1882–1898 1900
Thomas Smith	Protectionist	Nepean	1877–1887 1895–1898, 1901–1904
David Storey	Free Trade	Randwick	1894–1920
Josiah Thomas	Labour	Alma	1894–1901
Dugald Thomson	Free Trade	Warringah	1894–1901
James Thomson	Labour	Newcastle West	1895–1901
Thomas Waddell	Protectionist	Cobar	1897–1917
David Watkins	Labour	Wallsend	1894–1901
Chris Watson	Labour	Young	1894–1901
Henry Wheeler	Free Trade	Northumberland	1895–1898
Samuel Whiddon	Free Trade	Sydney-Cook	1894–1904
Bill Wilks	Free Trade	Balmain North	1894–1901
William Willis	Protectionist	Barwon	1889–1904
William Wood	Protectionist	Eden-Bombala	1894–1913
Francis Wright	Protectionist	Glen Innes	1882–1885, 1889–1903
James Young	Free Trade	Manning	1880–1901 1904–1907

By-elections

Under the constitution, ministers were required to resign to recontest their seats in a by-election when appointed. These by-elections are only noted when the minister was defeated; in general, he was elected unopposed.

#	Electorate	Departing Member	Party	Reason for By-election	Date of By-election	Winner of By-election	Party
1	Rylstone	John Fitzpatrick	Free Trade	Election result voided on appeal	14 October 1895	John Fitzpatrick	Free Trade
2	Sydney-Phillip	Dick Meagher	Protectionist	Resigned in disgrace in relation to the pardon of George Dean	17 October 1895	Henry Copeland	Protectionist
3	Waverley	Angus Cameron	Free Trade	Death	18 February 1896	Thomas Jessep	Free Trade
4	Cowra	Denis Donnelly	Protectionist	Death	27 March 1896	Michael Phillips	Protectionist
5	Lachlan	James Carroll	Protectionist	Financial difficulties	11 September 1896	James Carroll	Protectionist
6	Narrabri	Charles Collins	Free Trade	Death	3 June 1898	Hugh Ross	Labour
7	Sydney-Fitzroy	John McElhone	Ind. Free Trade	Death	3 June 1898	John Norton	Protectionist

== See also ==
- Reid ministry
- Results of the 1895 New South Wales colonial election
- Candidates of the 1895 New South Wales colonial election
