= Candidates of the 1895 New South Wales colonial election =

This is a list of candidates for the 1895 New South Wales colonial election. The election was held on 24 July 1895.

== Retiring members ==
=== Protectionist ===
- Patrick Hogan MLA (Raleigh)
- John Wilkinson MLA (Albury)

=== Free Trade ===
- Joseph Abbott MLA (Newtown-Camperdown)

=== Labor ===
- John Kirkpatrick MLA (Gunnedah)
- Michael Loughnane MLA (Grenfell)

== Legislative Assembly ==
Sitting members are shown in bold text. Successful candidates are highlighted in the relevant colour. Where there is possible confusion, an asterisk (*) is also used.

Electorate	Held by	Protectionist candidate	Free Trade candidate	Labor candidate	Other candidates
Albury	Protectionist	George Billson	Richard Ball		
Alma	Labor			**Josiah Thomas**	
Annandale	Free Trade	John Maxwell	**William Mahony**	John Skelton	William Williams (Ind FT)
Argyle	Protectionist	**Thomas Rose**	Benjamin Short		
Armidale	Protectionist	**Henry Copeland**	Edmund Lonsdale		
Ashburnham	Ind Labor	Joseph Reymond	**Albert Gardiner**	George Hutchinson	
Ashfield	Free Trade		**Thomas Bavister**		John Goodlet (Ind)
Ballina	Protectionist	**John Perry**			Thomas Temperley (Ind Prot)
Balmain North	Free Trade	Alexander Milne	**Bill Wilks**		Frank Smith (Ind FT)
Balmain South	Labor	Osborne Chidgey		**Sydney Law**	George Clubb (Ind FT); James Johnston (Ind Prot)
Barwon	Protectionist	**William Willis**		Donald Macdonell	
Bathurst	Free Trade	Jack FitzGerald	**Sydney Smith**		
Bega	Protectionist	**Thomas Rawlinson**			Henry Clarke (Ind Prot)
Bingara	Free Trade	William Dowel	**Samuel Moore**		
Boorowa	Protectionist	**Kenneth Mackay**		James Wilson	Robert Horne (Ind)
Botany	Free Trade		**William Stephen**	John Dacey	James Macfadyen (Ind FT)
Bourke	Free Trade	William Davis	**Edward Millen**		
Bowral	Free Trade		**William McCourt**		
Braidwood	Protectionist	**Austin Chapman**			Adolph Shadler (Ind FT)
Broken Hill	Labor			**John Cann**	
Burwood	Free Trade		**William McMillan**		William Archer (Ind FT)
Camden	Protectionist	**John Kidd**	Charles Bull		
Canterbury	Free Trade		**Varney Parkes**		Mark Hammond (Ind)
Clarence	Protectionist	**John McFarlane**			Frederick McGuren (Ind Prot)
Cobar	Protectionist	**Thomas Waddell**		Michael O'Halloran	M Lamrock (Ind FT)
Condoublin	Labor	Patrick Ryan		**Thomas Brown**	
Coonamble	Labor	George Loughnan		**Hugh Macdonald**	
Cowra	Protectionist	**Denis Donnelly**	William Cortis	Linus Bungate	Edward Bassett (Ind Prot)
Darlington	Protectionist	**William Schey**	Thomas Clarke	Robert Harris	
Deniliquin	Protectionist	**John Chanter**			William Burrell (Ind Lab); George Chandler (Ind FT)
Dubbo	Protectionist	**James Morgan**	Simeon Phillips		
Durham	Protectionist	**Herbert Brown**			Erskine Smith (Ind Prot)
East Maitland	Free Trade		**James Brunker**	Peter Curran	Samuel Clift (Ind Prot)
Eden-Bombala	Protectionist	**William Wood**	John Griffin		Coulson Murphy (Ind Prot)
Glebe	Free Trade	Michael Conlon	**James Hogue**		
Glen Innes	Protectionist	**Francis Wright**	John Wetherspoon		Alexander Hutchison (Ind Lab)
Gloucester	Protectionist	**Richard Price**			William Ellingworth (Ind Lab)
Goulburn	Free Trade	Arthur Barrett	**Leslie Hollis**		
Grafton	Protectionist	**John See**			
Granville	Labor			**George Smailes**	John Nobbs (Ind FT)
Grenfell	Labor	Robert Vaughn		William Holman	George Greene (Ind FT)
Gundagai	Protectionist	**John Barnes**		John Medway Day	John Miller (Ind Prot)
Gunnedah	Labor	Thomas Goodwin		Samuel Hutchin	John Rogers (Ind FT)
Hartley	Free Trade	William Sandford	**Joseph Cook**		James Dickie (Ind)
Hastings and Macleay	Protectionist	**Francis Clarke**	Walter Vivian		
Hawkesbury	Free Trade		**William Morgan**		Arthur Bowman (Ind)
Hay	Free Trade	James Newton	**James Ashton**		
Hume	Protectionist	**William Lyne**	Thomas Rhodes		
Illawarra	Free Trade	Francis Suttor	**Archibald Campbell**		
Inverell	Protectionist	**George Cruickshank**		Philip Moses	Thomas Jones (Ind Lab); Frederick Webster (Ind)
Kahibah	Labor			**Alfred Edden**	
Kiama	Protectionist	**Alexander Campbell**	Tom Cole		
Lachlan	Protectionist	**James Carroll**			George Bolton (Ind FT); A Skene (Ind FT)
Leichhardt	Free Trade		**John Hawthorne**	John Dobbie	
Lismore	Protectionist	**Thomas Ewing**			
Macquarie	Free Trade	William Hurley	**James Tonkin**	Frank Foster	William Paul (Ind FT)
Manning	Free Trade	Hugh McKinnon	**James Young**		
Marrickville	Free Trade	Thomas Jones	**Francis McLean**		James Eve (Ind FT)
Molong	Protectionist	**Andrew Ross**	Harrington McCulloch		Charles Lauer (Ind Prot); William Melville (Ind Prot); John Wynne (Ind Prot)
Monaro	Protectionist	**Gus Miller**	Edwin Tucker		
Moree	Protectionist	**Thomas Hassall**			Robert Buist (Ind Lab)
Moruya	Free Trade	William Boot	**William Millard**		
Mudgee	Free Trade	John McEwen	**Robert Jones**		
Murray	Protectionist	**James Hayes**	Hugh Bridson		David Fealy (Ind Prot)
Murrumbidgee	Protectionist	**Thomas Fitzpatrick**		Arthur Rae	
Narrabri	Free Trade	Job Sheldon	**Charles Collins**	Hugh Ross	
Nepean	Free Trade	Thomas Smith	**Samuel Lees**		
Newcastle East	Free Trade	William Sharpe	**William Dick**		
Newcastle West	Free Trade	David Scott	James Blanksby	James Thomson	Alfred Asher (Ind Prot); **James Ellis** (Ind FT)
Newtown-Camperdown	Free Trade	James Smith	Francis Cotton	Edward Riley	Joseph Mitchell (Ind FT)
Newtown-Erskine	Free Trade		**Edmund Molesworth**	Robert Hollis	
Newtown-St Peters	Free Trade	Herbert Shaw	**William Rigg**	Frederick Flowers	Ernest Guile (Ind FT); Archibald McKechnie (Ind); James Onan (Ind)
Northumberland	Protectionist	**Richard Stevenson**	Henry Wheeler		
Orange	Free Trade	James Dalton	**Harry Newman**		
Paddington	Free Trade		**William Shipway**	Arthur Fletcher	John Neild* (Ind FT); Thomas West (Ind FT)
Parramatta	Free Trade		**Dowell O'Reilly**		Hugh Taylor (Ind)
Petersham	Free Trade		**Llewellyn Jones**	Percy Hordern	Cornelius Danahey (Ind FT); George Wallace (Ind Prot)
Queanbeyan	Protectionist	**Edward O'Sullivan**	Walter Palmer		
Quirindi	Protectionist	**Robert Levien**		John Perry	
Raleigh	Protectionist		James Gregg		George Briner (Ind Prot); John McLaughlin* (Ind Prot); Eugene Rudder (Ind Prot)
Randwick	Free Trade	Thomas Tuck	**David Storey**		Alexander Wilson (Ind)
Redfern	Labor	Henry Hoyle		**James McGowen**	Samuel Bradley (Ind FT)
Richmond	Protectionist	**Robert Pyers**			Donald Cameron (Ind Prot); George Martin (Ind Prot); Robert Page (Ind Prot)
Robertson	Protectionist	**Robert Fitzgerald**		Francis Gilbert	Thomas Johnston (Ind FT)
Ryde	Free Trade		**Frank Farnell**		Edward Terry (Ind FT)
Rylstone	Protectionist	**William Wall**	John Fitzpatrick		
St George	Free Trade		**Joseph Carruthers**		William Taylor (Ind)
St Leonards	Free Trade		**Edward Clark**		William Goddard (Ind FT)
Sherbrooke	Free Trade		**Jacob Garrard**		Broughton O'Conor (Ind); Thomas Pye (Ind Prot); George Stimson (Ind Prot); Edward Wakely (Ind FT)
Shoalhaven	Free Trade	Thomas Kennedy			**Philip Morton*** (Ind FT); W R Reid (Ind Prot)
Singleton	Free Trade	Alfred Holden	**Albert Gould**		
Sturt	Labor			**William Ferguson**	
Sydney-Belmore	Free Trade	Francis Freehill	**James Graham**		
Sydney-Bligh	Free Trade	Patrick Quinn	James Harvey	Reginald Daly	**James Martin** (Ind FT)
Sydney-Cook	Free Trade	William Traill	**Samuel Whiddon**		
Sydney-Denison	Free Trade	Henry Macnamara	**Matthew Harris**		
Sydney-Fitzroy	Free Trade		**Henry Chapman**	Henry Cato	Henry Harris (Ind); John McElhone* (Ind FT)
Sydney-Flinders	Free Trade	Arthur Nelson	John Waine	John Buckley	Eden George (Ind FT); **Bernhard Wise** (Ind)
Sydney-Gipps	Labor			**George Black**	Daniel O'Connor (Ind)
Sydney-King	Free Trade		**George Reid**		**Sir Henry Parkes** (Ind)
Sydney-Lang	Labor			**Billy Hughes**	John Anderson (Ind FT); Harry Foran (Ind Prot); John Taylor (Ind FT)
Sydney-Phillip	Free Trade	Dick Meagher	**Robert Fowler**		
Sydney-Pyrmont	Labor			**Thomas Davis**	John Carter (Ind FT); Cyrus Fuller (Ind Prot); Thomas Houghton (Ind); George Perry (Ind Prot)
Tamworth	Protectionist	**George Dibbs**	Albert Piddington		
Tenterfield	Free Trade	John Coxall	**Charles Lee**		
Tumut	Protectionist	**Travers Jones**	John Channon		Nathaniel Emanuel (Ind FT); Robert Newman (Ind Prot)
Tweed	Protectionist	**Joseph Kelly**	William Baker	Sam Rosa	Norman Ewing (Ind Prot); George Halliday (Ind Prot); John Morrison (Ind Prot)
Uralla-Walcha	Free Trade	James Proctor	**William Piddington**		
Wagga Wagga	Protectionist	**James Gormly**	Thomas Halloran		
Wallsend	Labor	Thomas Walker		**David Watkins**	
Waratah	Labor	Ninian Melville		**Arthur Griffith**	William Conn (Ind FT); James McWilliams (Ind Lab)
Warringah	Free Trade		**Dugald Thomson**		Henry Moss (Ind FT)
Waterloo	Free Trade	John Norton	**George Anderson**	Ernest Banner	
Waverley	Free Trade	Thomas Barlow	**Angus Cameron**		Alfred Allen (Ind FT); William Allen (Ind Prot)
Wellington	Free Trade	Louis Veech	**John Haynes**		
Wentworth	Protectionist	**Sir Joseph Abbott**		Robert Scobie	
West Macquarie	Protectionist	**Paddy Crick**	John Hurley		
West Maitland	Free Trade		**John Gillies**		Richard Proctor (Ind Prot)
Wickham	Free Trade		**John Fegan**	William Webster	
Wilcannia	Labor			**Richard Sleath**	
Willoughby	Free Trade	William Richardson	George Howarth		Joseph Cullen (Ind FT)
Woollahra	Free Trade		**Adrian Knox**		John Gannon (Ind Prot); William Harding (Ind FT)
Woronora	Ind Labor				Thomas Bissell (Ind FT); **John Nicholson*** (Ind Lab)
Yass	Free Trade	Thomas Colls	**William Affleck**		
Young	Labor	John Forsythe		**Chris Watson**	

== See also ==
- Members of the New South Wales Legislative Assembly, 1895–1898
