= Results of the 1895 New South Wales colonial election =

Colonial election for New South Wales, Australia in July 1895

New South Wales colonial election, 24 July 1895 Legislative Assembly << 1894–1898 >>
Enrolled voters	253,125				
Votes cast	151,680		Turnout	59.92	−18.64
Informal votes	1,354		Informal	0.88	−0.74
Summary of votes by party
Party	Primary votes	%	Swing	Seats	Change
Free Trade	56,347	37.15	+6.81	58	+8
Protectionist	50,703	33.43	+5.74	42	+5
Labor	20,028	13.20	−3.29	18	+3
Ind. Free Trade	11,096	7.32	–4.29	4	−7
Ind. Protectionist	6,547	4.32	−2.86	2	−2
Independent	5,107	3.37	+2.41	0	±0
Independent Labor	1,852	1.22	−4.50	1	−7
Total	151,680			125	

The 1895 New South Wales colonial election was for 125 electoral districts, with each district returning one member. The election was conducted on the basis of a simple majority or first-past-the-post voting system. In this election, in 23 electorates the winning candidate received less than 50% of the votes, while 8 were uncontested. The average number of enrolled voters per electorate was 2,025, ranging from Lismore (1,366) to Marrickville (2,863).

== Election results ==
=== Albury ===
1895 New South Wales colonial election: Albury
Party	Candidate	Votes	%	±%
Free Trade	Richard Ball	814	56.3	
Protectionist	George Billson	633	43.8	
Total formal votes		1,447	98.9	
Informal votes		16	1.1	
Turnout		1,463	73.3	
Free Trade gain from Protectionist				

=== Alma ===
1895 New South Wales colonial election: Alma
Party	Candidate	Votes	%	±%
Labour	Josiah Thomas	unopposed		
Labour hold				

=== Annandale ===
1895 New South Wales colonial election: Annandale
Party	Candidate	Votes	%	±%
Free Trade	William Mahony	783	58.3	+23.0
Protectionist	John Maxwell	411	30.6	+16.7
Labour	John Skelton	146	10.9	−17.4
Ind. Free Trade	William Williams	4	0.3	
Total formal votes		1,344	98.9	−0.2
Informal votes		15	1.1	+0.2
Turnout		1,359	61.8	−21.9
Free Trade hold				

=== Argyle ===
1895 New South Wales colonial election: Argyle
Party	Candidate	Votes	%	±%
Protectionist	Thomas Rose	751	58.6	
Free Trade	Benjamin Short	531	41.4	
Total formal votes		1,282	98.8	
Informal votes		16	1.2	
Turnout		1,298	66.8	
Protectionist hold				

=== Armidale ===
1895 New South Wales colonial election: Armidale
Party	Candidate	Votes	%	±%
Free Trade	Edmund Lonsdale	891	50.4	
Protectionist	Henry Copeland	876	49.6	
Total formal votes		1,767	99.6	
Informal votes		8	0.5	
Turnout		1,775	71.2	
Free Trade gain from Protectionist				

=== Ashburnham ===
1895 New South Wales colonial election: Ashburnham
Party	Candidate	Votes	%	±%
Protectionist	Joseph Reymond	672	44.0	
Free Trade	Albert Gardiner	534	35.0	
Labour	George Hutchinson	322	21.1	
Total formal votes		1,528	99.7	
Informal votes		5	0.3	
Turnout		1,533	70.1	
Protectionist gain from Free Trade				

=== Ashfield ===
1895 New South Wales colonial election: Ashfield
Party	Candidate	Votes	%	±%
Free Trade	Thomas Bavister	883	55.2	
Independent	John Goodlet	718	44.9	
Total formal votes		1,601	99.5	
Informal votes		8	0.5	
Turnout		1,609	68.5	
Free Trade hold				

=== Ballina ===
1895 New South Wales colonial election: Ballina
Party	Candidate	Votes	%	±%
Protectionist	John Perry (b 1845)	489	53.7	
Ind. Protectionist	Thomas Temperley	422	46.3	
Total formal votes		911	99.0	
Informal votes		9	1.0	
Turnout		920	61.8	
Protectionist hold				

=== Balmain North ===
1895 New South Wales colonial election: Balmain North
Party	Candidate	Votes	%	±%
Free Trade	Bill Wilks	1,055	65.4	
Protectionist	Alexander Milne	523	32.4	
Ind. Free Trade	Frank Smith	36	2.2	
Total formal votes		1,614	99.5	
Informal votes		9	0.6	
Turnout		1,623	62.3	
Free Trade hold				

=== Balmain South ===
1895 New South Wales colonial election: Balmain South
Party	Candidate	Votes	%	±%
Labour	Sydney Law	901	49.8	
Ind. Protectionist	James Johnston	601	33.2	
Ind. Free Trade	George Clubb	197	10.9	
Protectionist	Osborne Chidgey	111	6.1	
Total formal votes		1,810	98.8	
Informal votes		22	1.2	
Turnout		1,832	71.4	
Labour hold				

=== The Barwon ===
1895 New South Wales colonial election: The Barwon
Party	Candidate	Votes	%	±%
Protectionist	William Willis	564	54.6	
Labour	Donald Macdonell	469	45.4	
Total formal votes		1,033	98.1	
Informal votes		20	1.9	
Turnout		1,053	58.6	
Protectionist hold				

=== Bathurst ===
1895 New South Wales colonial election: Bathurst
Party	Candidate	Votes	%	±%
Free Trade	Sydney Smith	939	55.8	
Protectionist	Jack FitzGerald	745	44.2	
Total formal votes		1,684	99.5	
Informal votes		9	0.5	
Turnout		1,693	72.5	
Free Trade hold				

=== Bega ===
1895 New South Wales colonial election: Bega
Party	Candidate	Votes	%	±%
Ind. Protectionist	Henry Clarke	880	62.1	
Protectionist	Thomas Rawlinson	537	37.9	
Total formal votes		1,417	98.8	
Informal votes		17	1.2	
Turnout		1,434	71.4	
Ind. Protectionist gain from Protectionist				

=== Bingara ===
1895 New South Wales colonial election: Bingara
Party	Candidate	Votes	%	±%
Free Trade	Samuel Moore	740	59.0	
Protectionist	William Dowel	515	41.0	
Total formal votes		1,255	99.5	
Informal votes		7	0.6	
Turnout		1,262	61.3	
Free Trade hold				

=== Boorowa ===
1895 New South Wales colonial election: Boorowa
Party	Candidate	Votes	%	±%
Protectionist	Kenneth Mackay	727	55.0	
Labour	James Wilson	590	44.6	
Independent	Robert Horne	5	0.4	
Total formal votes		1,322	98.1	
Informal votes		26	1.9	
Turnout		1,348	72.8	
Protectionist hold				

=== Botany ===
1895 New South Wales colonial election: Botany
Party	Candidate	Votes	%	±%
Labour	John Dacey	610	43.4	
Free Trade	William Stephen	607	43.1	
Ind. Free Trade	James Macfadyen	190	13.5	
Total formal votes		1,407	99.0	
Informal votes		14	1.0	
Turnout		1,421	71.0	
Labour gain from Ind. Free Trade				

=== Bourke ===
1895 New South Wales colonial election: Bourke
Party	Candidate	Votes	%	±%
Free Trade	Edward Millen (elected)	517	63.5	
Protectionist	William Davis	297	36.5	
Total formal votes		814	98.9	
Informal votes		9	1.1	
Turnout		823	49.6	
Free Trade hold				

=== Bowral ===
1895 New South Wales colonial election: Bowral
Party	Candidate	Votes	%	±%
Free Trade	William McCourt	unopposed		
Free Trade hold				

=== Braidwood ===
1895 New South Wales colonial election: Braidwood
Party	Candidate	Votes	%	±%
Protectionist	Austin Chapman	887	74.7	
Ind. Free Trade	Adolph Shadler	300	25.3	
Total formal votes		1,187	99.6	
Informal votes		5	0.4	
Turnout		1,192	56.5	
Protectionist hold				

=== Broken Hill ===
1895 New South Wales colonial election: Broken Hill
Party	Candidate	Votes	%	±%
Labour	John Cann	unopposed		
Labour hold				

=== Burwood ===
1895 New South Wales colonial election: Burwood
Party	Candidate	Votes	%	±%
Free Trade	William McMillan	730	62.5	
Ind. Free Trade	William Archer	439	37.6	
Total formal votes		1,169	99.2	
Informal votes		10	0.9	
Turnout		1,179	60.4	
Free Trade hold				

=== Camden ===
1895 New South Wales colonial election: Camden
Party	Candidate	Votes	%	±%
Free Trade	Charles Bull	849	50.6	
Protectionist	John Kidd (defeated)	828	49.4	
Total formal votes		1,677	99.7	
Informal votes		5	0.3	
Turnout		1,682	70.6	
Free Trade gain from Protectionist				

=== Canterbury ===
1895 New South Wales colonial election: Canterbury
Party	Candidate	Votes	%	±%
Free Trade	Varney Parkes	955	71.9	
Independent	Mark Hammond	373	28.1	
Total formal votes		1,328	99.6	
Informal votes		6	0.5	
Turnout		1,334	50.7	
Free Trade hold				

=== The Clarence ===
1895 New South Wales colonial election: The Clarence
Party	Candidate	Votes	%	±%
Protectionist	John McFarlane	851	65.5	
Ind. Protectionist	Frederick McGuren	449	34.5	
Total formal votes		1,300	99.3	
Informal votes		9	0.7	
Turnout		1,309	71.1	
Protectionist hold				

=== Cobar ===
1895 New South Wales colonial election: Cobar
Party	Candidate	Votes	%	±%
Protectionist	Thomas Waddell	538	59.5	
Labour	Michael O'Halloran	357	39.5	
Ind. Free Trade	McA Lamrock	9	1.0	
Total formal votes		904	99.1	
Informal votes		8	0.9	
Turnout		912	55.3	
Protectionist hold				

=== Condoublin ===
1895 New South Wales colonial election: Condoublin
Party	Candidate	Votes	%	±%
Labour	Thomas Brown	707	64.2	
Protectionist	Patrick Ryan	394	35.8	
Total formal votes		1,101	98.5	
Informal votes		17	1.5	
Turnout		1,118	55.9	
Member changed to Labour from Independent Labour				

=== Coonamble ===
1895 New South Wales colonial election: Coonamble
Party	Candidate	Votes	%	±%
Labour	Hugh Macdonald	598	51.4	
Protectionist	George Loughnan	566	48.6	
Total formal votes		1,164	99.3	
Informal votes		8	0.7	
Turnout		1,172	58.1	
Labour hold				

=== Cowra ===
1895 New South Wales colonial election: Cowra
Party	Candidate	Votes	%	±%
Protectionist	Denis Donnelly	669	51.2	
Labour	Linus Bungate	456	34.9	
Free Trade	William Cortis	149	11.4	
Ind. Protectionist	Edward Bassett	32	2.5	
Total formal votes		1,306	98.5	
Informal votes		20	1.5	
Turnout		1,326	69.8	
Protectionist hold				

=== Darlington ===
1895 New South Wales colonial election: Darlington
Party	Candidate	Votes	%	±%
Protectionist	William Schey	758	47.4	
Free Trade	Thomas Clarke	700	43.8	
Labour	Robert Harris	140	8.8	
Total formal votes		1,598	99.3	
Informal votes		12	0.8	
Turnout		1,610	62.6	
Member changed to Protectionist from Independent Labour				

=== Deniliquin ===
1895 New South Wales colonial election: Deniliquin
Party	Candidate	Votes	%	±%
Protectionist	John Chanter	696	67.3	
Ind. Free Trade	George Chandler	331	32.0	
Independent Labour	William Burrell	8	0.8	
Total formal votes		1,035	97.9	
Informal votes		22	2.1	
Turnout		1,057	53.7	
Protectionist hold				

=== Dubbo ===
1895 New South Wales colonial election: Dubbo
Party	Candidate	Votes	%	±%
Free Trade	Simeon Phillips	689	51.0	
Protectionist	James Morgan	663	49.0	
Total formal votes		1,352	99.6	
Informal votes		6	0.4	
Turnout		1,358	71.2	
Free Trade gain from Protectionist				

=== Durham ===
1895 New South Wales colonial election: Durham
Party	Candidate	Votes	%	±%
Protectionist	Herbert Brown	781	77.6	
Ind. Protectionist	Erskine Smith	226	22.4	
Total formal votes		1,007	99.2	
Informal votes		8	0.8	
Turnout		1,015	48.1	
Member changed to Protectionist from Ind. Free Trade				

=== East Maitland ===
1895 New South Wales colonial election: East Maitland
Party	Candidate	Votes	%	±%
Free Trade	James Brunker	854	60.5	
Labour	Peter Curran	319	22.6	
Ind. Protectionist	Samuel Clift	238	16.9	
Total formal votes		1,411	99.1	
Informal votes		13	0.9	
Turnout		1,424	80.0	
Free Trade hold				

=== Eden-Bombala ===
1895 New South Wales colonial election: Eden-Bombala
Party	Candidate	Votes	%	±%
Protectionist	William Wood	544	44.9	
Ind. Protectionist	Coulson Murphy	485	40.1	
Free Trade	John Griffin	182	15.0	
Total formal votes		1,211	99.3	
Informal votes		8	0.7	
Turnout		1,219	66.3	
Protectionist hold				

=== Glebe ===
1895 New South Wales colonial election: Glebe
Party	Candidate	Votes	%	±%
Free Trade	James Hogue	899	61.2	
Protectionist	Michael Conlon	570	38.8	
Total formal votes		1,469	99.0	
Informal votes		15	1.0	
Turnout		1,484	59.9	
Free Trade hold				

=== Glen Innes ===
1895 New South Wales colonial election: Glen Innes
Party	Candidate	Votes	%	±%
Protectionist	Francis Wright	510	46.8	
Independent Labour	Alexander Hutchison	368	33.8	
Free Trade	John Wetherspoon	211	19.4	
Total formal votes		1,089	99.3	
Informal votes		8	0.7	
Turnout		1,097	62.0	
Protectionist hold				

=== Gloucester ===
1895 New South Wales colonial election: Gloucester
Party	Candidate	Votes	%	±%
Protectionist	Richard Price	904	86.5	
Independent Labour	William Ellingworth	141	13.5	
Total formal votes		1,045	99.5	
Informal votes		5	0.5	
Turnout		1,050	48.2	
Protectionist hold				

=== Goulburn ===
1895 New South Wales colonial election: Goulburn
Party	Candidate	Votes	%	±%
Free Trade	Leslie Hollis	917	71.2	
Protectionist	Arthur Barrett	371	28.8	
Total formal votes		1,288	99.1	
Informal votes		12	0.9	
Turnout		1,300	65.5	
Free Trade hold				

=== Grafton ===
1895 New South Wales colonial election: Grafton
Party	Candidate	Votes	%	±%
Protectionist	John See	unopposed		
Protectionist hold				

=== Granville ===
1895 New South Wales colonial election: Granville
Party	Candidate	Votes	%	±%
Labour	George Smailes	799	54.3	
Ind. Free Trade	John Nobbs	673	45.7	
Total formal votes		1,472	99.1	
Informal votes		14	0.9	
Turnout		1,486	67.1	
Labour hold				

=== Grenfell ===
1895 New South Wales colonial election: Grenfell
Party	Candidate	Votes	%	±%
Ind. Free Trade	George Greene	664	48.8	
Labour	William Holman	551	40.5	
Protectionist	Robert Vaughn	146	10.7	
Total formal votes		1,361	99.4	
Informal votes		8	0.6	
Turnout		1,369	68.0	
Ind. Free Trade gain from Labour				

=== Gundagai ===
1895 New South Wales colonial election: Gundagai
Party	Candidate	Votes	%	±%
Protectionist	John Barnes	648	47.8	
Labour	John Day	464	34.2	
Ind. Protectionist	John Miller	244	18.0	
Total formal votes		1,356	99.1	
Informal votes		13	1.0	
Turnout		1,369	66.9	
Protectionist hold				

=== Gunnedah ===
1895 New South Wales colonial election: Gunnedah
Party	Candidate	Votes	%	±%
Protectionist	Thomas Goodwin	649	59.1	
Labour	Samuel Hutchin	422	38.4	
Ind. Free Trade	John Rogers	28	2.6	
Total formal votes		1,099	98.2	
Informal votes		20	1.8	
Turnout		1,119	59.8	
Protectionist gain from Labour				

=== Hartley ===
1895 New South Wales colonial election: Hartley
Party	Candidate	Votes	%	±%
Free Trade	Joseph Cook	822	65.5	
Protectionist	William Sandford	412	32.8	
Independent	James Dickie	22	1.8	
Total formal votes		1,256	98.7	
Informal votes		16	1.3	
Turnout		1,272	63.9	
Free Trade hold				

=== The Hastings and The Macleay ===
1895 New South Wales colonial election: The Hastings and The Macleay
Party	Candidate	Votes	%	±%
Protectionist	Francis Clarke	791	51.8	
Free Trade	Walter Vivian	736	48.2	
Total formal votes		1,527	99.1	
Informal votes		14	0.9	
Turnout		1,541	69.9	
Protectionist hold				

=== The Hawkesbury ===
1895 New South Wales colonial election: The Hawkesbury
Party	Candidate	Votes	%	±%
Free Trade	William Morgan	1,065	61.0	
Independent	Arthur Bowman	680	39.0	
Total formal votes		1,745	99.5	
Informal votes		8	0.5	
Turnout		1,753	75.8	
Member changed to Free Trade from Ind. Free Trade				

=== Hay ===
1895 New South Wales colonial election: Hay
Party	Candidate	Votes	%	±%
Free Trade	James Ashton	556	61.3	
Protectionist	James Newton	351	38.7	
Total formal votes		907	98.5	
Informal votes		14	1.5	
Turnout		921	50.8	
Free Trade hold				

=== The Hume ===
1895 New South Wales colonial election: The Hume
Party	Candidate	Votes	%	±%
Protectionist	William Lyne	632	69.1	
Free Trade	Thomas Rhodes	283	30.9	
Total formal votes		915	99.4	
Informal votes		6	0.7	
Turnout		921	56.4	
Protectionist hold				

=== Illawarra ===
1895 New South Wales colonial election: Illawarra
Party	Candidate	Votes	%	±%
Free Trade	Archibald Campbell	875	63.0	
Protectionist	Francis Suttor	515	37.1	
Total formal votes		1,390	99.5	
Informal votes		7	0.5	
Turnout		1,397	73.8	
Free Trade hold				

=== Inverell ===
1895 New South Wales colonial election: Inverell
Party	Candidate	Votes	%	±%
Protectionist	George Cruickshank	717	79.3	
Labour	Philip Moses	174	19.3	
Independent Labour	Thomas Jones	7	0.8	
Independent	F Webster	6	0.7	
Total formal votes		904	97.5	
Informal votes		23	2.5	
Turnout		927	55.4	
Protectionist hold				

=== Kahibah ===
1895 New South Wales colonial election: Kahibah
Party	Candidate	Votes	%	±%
Labour	Alfred Edden	unopposed		
Member changed to Labour from Independent Labour				

Alfred Edden left Labor in 1891 over the question of the solidarity pledge and was elected as an Independent Labour member in 1894 and rejoined Labour before this election.

=== Kiama ===
1895 New South Wales colonial election: Kiama
Party	Candidate	Votes	%	±%
Protectionist	Alexander Campbell	731	55.4	
Free Trade	John Cole	588	44.6	
Total formal votes		1,319	99.3	
Informal votes		10	0.8	
Turnout		1,329	71.8	
Protectionist hold				

=== The Lachlan ===
1895 New South Wales colonial election: The Lachlan
Party	Candidate	Votes	%	±%
Protectionist	James Carroll	469	75.0	
Ind. Free Trade	A Skene	146	23.4	
Ind. Free Trade	George Bolton	10	1.6	
Total formal votes		625	98.4	
Informal votes		10	1.6	
Turnout		635	40.3	
Member changed to Protectionist from Ind. Protectionist				

=== Leichhardt ===
1895 New South Wales colonial election: Leichhardt
Party	Candidate	Votes	%	±%
Free Trade	John Hawthorne	990	57.7	
Labour	John Dobbie	727	42.3	
Total formal votes		1,717	99.5	
Informal votes		9	0.5	
Turnout		1,726	65.8	
Free Trade hold				

=== Lismore ===
1895 New South Wales colonial election: Lismore
Party	Candidate	Votes	%	±%
Protectionist	Thomas Ewing	unopposed		
Protectionist hold				

=== Macquarie ===
1895 New South Wales colonial election: Macquarie
Party	Candidate	Votes	%	±%
Protectionist	William Hurley	575	42.8	
Free Trade	James Tonkin	438	32.6	
Ind. Free Trade	William Paul	233	17.4	
Labour	Francis Foster	97	7.2	
Total formal votes		1,343	99.2	
Informal votes		11	0.8	
Turnout		1,354	60.7	
Protectionist gain from Free Trade				

=== Manaro ===
1895 New South Wales colonial election: Manaro
Party	Candidate	Votes	%	±%
Protectionist	Gus Miller	646	67.3	
Free Trade	Edwin Tucker	314	32.7	
Total formal votes		960	99.3	
Informal votes		7	0.7	
Turnout		967	46.5	
Protectionist hold				

=== The Manning ===
1895 New South Wales colonial election: The Manning
Party	Candidate	Votes	%	±%
Free Trade	James Young	776	51.0	
Protectionist	Hugh McKinnon	745	49.0	
Total formal votes		1,521	99.6	
Informal votes		6	0.4	
Turnout		1,527	81.7	
Free Trade hold				

=== Marrickville ===
1895 New South Wales colonial election: Marrickville
Party	Candidate	Votes	%	±%
Free Trade	Francis McLean	1,159	70.7	
Protectionist	Thomas Jones	313	19.1	
Ind. Free Trade	James Eve	167	10.2	
Total formal votes		1,639	99.5	
Informal votes		9	0.6	
Turnout		1,648	57.6	
Free Trade hold				

=== Molong ===
1895 New South Wales colonial election: Molong
Party	Candidate	Votes	%	±%
Protectionist	Andrew Ross	548	45.3	
Free Trade	Harrington McCulloch	412	34.1	
Ind. Protectionist	John Wynne	108	8.9	
Ind. Protectionist	William Melville	85	7.0	
Ind. Protectionist	Charles Lauer	56	4.6	
Total formal votes		1,209	99.1	
Informal votes		11	0.9	
Turnout		1,220	64.2	
Protectionist hold				

=== Moree ===
1895 New South Wales colonial election: Moree
Party	Candidate	Votes	%	±%
Protectionist	Thomas Hassall	546	58.1	
Independent Labour	Robert Buist	394	41.9	
Total formal votes		940	99.4	
Informal votes		6	0.6	
Turnout		946	58.1	
Protectionist hold				

=== Moruya ===
1895 New South Wales colonial election: Moruya
Party	Candidate	Votes	%	±%
Free Trade	William Millard	733	56.8	
Protectionist	William Boot	557	43.2	
Total formal votes		1,290	99.6	
Informal votes		5	0.4	
Turnout		1,295	71.7	
Free Trade hold				

=== Mudgee ===
1895 New South Wales colonial election: Mudgee
Party	Candidate	Votes	%	±%
Free Trade	Robert Jones	971	55.8	
Protectionist	J McEwen	768	44.2	
Total formal votes		1,739	99.2	
Informal votes		14	0.8	
Turnout		1,753	69.2	
Free Trade hold				

=== The Murray ===
1895 New South Wales colonial election: The Murray
Party	Candidate	Votes	%	±%
Protectionist	James Hayes	661	60.0	
Free Trade	Hugh Bridson	408	37.1	
Ind. Protectionist	David Fealy	32	2.9	
Total formal votes		1,101	97.4	
Informal votes		30	2.7	
Turnout		1,131	55.3	
Protectionist hold				

=== The Murrumbidgee ===
1895 New South Wales colonial election: The Murrumbidgee
Party	Candidate	Votes	%	±%
Protectionist	Thomas Fitzpatrick	766	54.4	
Labour	Arthur Rae	641	45.6	
Total formal votes		1,407	99.7	
Informal votes		5	0.4	
Turnout		1,412	68.3	
Protectionist hold				

=== Narrabri ===
1895 New South Wales colonial election: Narrabri
Party	Candidate	Votes	%	±%
Free Trade	Charles Collins	428	40.1	
Labour	Hugh Ross	382	35.8	
Protectionist	Job Sheldon	258	24.2	
Total formal votes		1,068	99.7	
Informal votes		3	0.3	
Turnout		1,071	55.6	
Free Trade hold				

=== The Nepean ===
1895 New South Wales colonial election: The Nepean
Party	Candidate	Votes	%	±%
Protectionist	Thomas Smith	806	51.4	
Free Trade	Samuel Lees	763	48.6	
Total formal votes		1,569	99.4	
Informal votes		9	0.6	
Turnout		1,578	76.6	
Protectionist gain from Free Trade				

=== Newcastle East ===
1895 New South Wales colonial election: Newcastle East
Party	Candidate	Votes	%	±%
Free Trade	William Dick	783	60.3	
Protectionist	William Sharpe	516	39.7	
Total formal votes		1,299	99.8	
Informal votes		3	0.2	
Turnout		1,302	72.8	
Free Trade hold				

=== Newcastle West ===
1895 New South Wales colonial election: Newcastle West
Party	Candidate	Votes	%	±%
Labour	James Thomson	329	29.6	
Free Trade	James Blanksby	317	28.5	
Ind. Free Trade	James Ellis	249	22.4	
Protectionist	David Scott	193	17.3	
Ind. Protectionist	Alfred Asher	25	2.3	
Total formal votes		1,113	99.4	
Informal votes		7	0.6	
Turnout		1,120	75.2	
Labour gain from Free Trade				

=== Newtown-Camperdown ===
1895 New South Wales colonial election: Newtown-Camperdown
Party	Candidate	Votes	%	±%
Free Trade	Francis Cotton	530	38.4	
Protectionist	James Smith	450	32.6	
Labour	Edward Riley	214	15.5	
Ind. Free Trade	Joseph Mitchell	188	13.6	
Total formal votes		1,382	98.8	
Informal votes		17	1.2	
Turnout		1,399	61.7	
Free Trade hold				

=== Newtown-Erskine ===
1895 New South Wales colonial election: Newtown-Erskine
Party	Candidate	Votes	%	±%
Free Trade	Edmund Molesworth	663	54.8	
Labour	Robert Hollis	546	45.2	
Total formal votes		1,209	99.1	
Informal votes		11	0.9	
Turnout		1,220	62.6	
Free Trade hold				

=== Newtown-St Peters ===
1895 New South Wales colonial election: Newtown-St Peters
Party	Candidate	Votes	%	±%
Free Trade	William Rigg	920	62.0	
Labour	Frederick Flowers	342	23.0	
Protectionist	Herbert Shaw	141	9.5	
Ind. Free Trade	Ernest Guile	76	5.1	
Independent	Archibald McKechnie	4	0.3	
Independent	James Onan	2	0.1	
Total formal votes		1,485	98.6	
Informal votes		21	1.4	
Turnout		1,506	65.8	
Free Trade hold				

=== Northumberland ===
1895 New South Wales colonial election: Northumberland
Party	Candidate	Votes	%	±%
Free Trade	Henry Wheeler	719	52.8	
Protectionist	Richard Stevenson	643	47.2	
Total formal votes		1,362	99.4	
Informal votes		8	0.6	
Turnout		1,370	72.5	
Free Trade gain from Protectionist				

=== Orange ===
1895 New South Wales colonial election: Orange
Party	Candidate	Votes	%	±%
Free Trade	Harry Newman	943	55.3	
Protectionist	James Dalton	763	44.7	
Total formal votes		1,706	99.6	
Informal votes		7	0.4	
Turnout		1,713	70.6	
Free Trade hold				

=== Paddington ===
1895 New South Wales colonial election: Paddington
Party	Candidate	Votes	%	±%
Ind. Free Trade	John Neild	613	39.3	
Ind. Free Trade	Thomas West	476	30.5	
Free Trade	William Shipway	424	27.2	
Labour	Arthur Fletcher	47	3.0	
Total formal votes		1,560	99.1	
Informal votes		15	1.0	
Turnout		1,575	63.8	
Ind. Free Trade gain from Free Trade				

=== Parramatta ===
1895 New South Wales colonial election: Parramatta
Party	Candidate	Votes	%	±%
Free Trade	Dowell O'Reilly	956	56.10	
Independent	Hugh Taylor	748	43.90	
Total formal votes		1,704	99.53	
Informal votes		8	0.47	
Turnout		1,712	81.33	
Free Trade hold		Swing		

=== Petersham ===
1895 New South Wales colonial election: Petersham
Party	Candidate	Votes	%	±%
Free Trade	Llewellyn Jones	643	49.5	
Labour	Percy Hordern	371	28.5	
Ind. Free Trade	Cornelius Danahey	279	21.5	
Ind. Protectionist	George Wallace	7	0.5	
Total formal votes		1,300	99.2	
Informal votes		11	0.8	
Turnout		1,311	61.5	
Free Trade hold				

=== Queanbeyan ===
1895 New South Wales colonial election: Queanbeyan
Party	Candidate	Votes	%	±%
Protectionist	Edward O'Sullivan	701	59.3	
Free Trade	Walter Palmer	481	40.7	
Total formal votes		1,182	98.9	
Informal votes		13	1.1	
Turnout		1,195	67.7	
Protectionist hold				

=== Quirindi ===
1895 New South Wales colonial election: Quirindi
Party	Candidate	Votes	%	±%
Protectionist	Robert Levien	585	59.0	
Labour	John Perry (born 1849)	407	41.0	
Total formal votes		992	99.5	
Informal votes		5	0.5	
Turnout		997	59.5	
Protectionist hold				

=== Raleigh ===
1895 New South Wales colonial election: Raleigh
Party	Candidate	Votes	%	±%
Ind. Protectionist	John McLaughlin	567	47.8	
Free Trade	James Gregg	313	26.4	
Ind. Protectionist	George Briner	287	24.2	
Ind. Protectionist	Eugene Rudder	20	1.7	
Total formal votes		1,187	99.3	
Informal votes		9	0.8	
Turnout		1,196	67.6	
Ind. Protectionist gain from Protectionist				

=== Randwick ===
1895 New South Wales colonial election: Randwick
Party	Candidate	Votes	%	±%
Free Trade	David Storey	796	59.2	
Independent	Alexander Wilson	430	32.0	
Protectionist	Thomas Tuck	119	8.9	
Total formal votes		1,345	99.4	
Informal votes		8	0.6	
Turnout		1,353	57.6	
Free Trade hold				

=== Redfern ===
1895 New South Wales colonial election: Redfern
Party	Candidate	Votes	%	±%
Labour	James McGowen	948	59.1	
Protectionist	Henry Hoyle	614	38.3	
Ind. Free Trade	Samuel Bradley	43	2.7	
Total formal votes		1,605	99.6	
Informal votes		6	0.4	
Turnout		1,611	62.8	
Labour hold				

=== The Richmond ===
1895 New South Wales colonial election: The Richmond
Party	Candidate	Votes	%	±%
Protectionist	Robert Pyers	517	53.2	
Ind. Protectionist	Robert Page	392	40.4	
Ind. Protectionist	Donald Cameron	38	3.9	
Ind. Protectionist	George Martin	24	2.5	
Total formal votes		971	98.3	
Informal votes		17	1.7	
Turnout		988	59.5	
Protectionist hold				

=== Robertson ===
1895 New South Wales colonial election: Robertson
Party	Candidate	Votes	%	±%
Protectionist	Robert Fitzgerald	1,052	58.5	
Labour	Francis Gilbert	738	41.1	
Ind. Free Trade	Thomas Johnston	8	0.4	
Total formal votes		1,798	98.5	
Informal votes		27	1.5	
Turnout		1,825	71.0	
Protectionist hold				

=== Ryde ===
1895 New South Wales colonial election: Ryde
Party	Candidate	Votes	%	±%
Free Trade	Frank Farnell	801	58.0	
Ind. Free Trade	Edward Terry	580	42.0	
Total formal votes		1,381	99.6	
Informal votes		5	0.4	
Turnout		1,386	64.7	
Free Trade hold				

=== Rylstone ===
1895 New South Wales colonial election: Rylstone
Party	Candidate	Votes	%	±%
Free Trade	John Fitzpatrick	513	50.3	
Protectionist	William Wall	507	49.7	
Total formal votes		1,020	99.2	
Informal votes		8	0.8	
Turnout		1,028	54.6	
Free Trade gain from Protectionist				

=== St George ===
1895 New South Wales colonial election: St George
Party	Candidate	Votes	%	±%
Free Trade	Joseph Carruthers	1,380	82.7	
Independent	William Taylor	289	17.3	
Total formal votes		1,669	99.2	
Informal votes		13	0.8	
Turnout		1,682	63.2	
Free Trade hold				

=== St Leonards ===
1895 New South Wales colonial election: St Leonards
Party	Candidate	Votes	%	±%
Free Trade	Edward Clark	996	62.4	
Ind. Free Trade	William Goddard	601	37.6	
Total formal votes		1,597	99.0	
Informal votes		16	1.0	
Turnout		1,613	68.0	
Free Trade hold				

=== Sherbrooke ===
1895 New South Wales colonial election: Sherbrooke
Party	Candidate	Votes	%	±%
Free Trade	Jacob Garrard	585	54.5	
Independent	Broughton O'Conor	333	31.0	
Ind. Protectionist	George Stimson	95	8.9	
Ind. Protectionist	Thomas Pye	45	4.2	
Ind. Free Trade	Edward Wakely	15	1.4	
Total formal votes		1,073	98.4	
Informal votes		18	1.7	
Turnout		1,091	60.8	
Free Trade hold				

=== The Shoalhaven ===
1895 New South Wales colonial election: The Shoalhaven
Party	Candidate	Votes	%	±%
Ind. Free Trade	Philip Morton	755	56.6	
Protectionist	Thomas Kennedy	571	42.8	
Ind. Protectionist	W Reid	7	0.5	
Total formal votes		1,333	97.8	
Informal votes		30	2.2	
Turnout		1,363	70.5	
Member changed to Ind. Free Trade from Free Trade				

=== Singleton ===
1895 New South Wales colonial election: Singleton
Party	Candidate	Votes	%	±%
Free Trade	Albert Gould	932	55.4	
Protectionist	Alfred Holden	751	44.6	
Total formal votes		1,683	99.2	
Informal votes		13	0.8	
Turnout		1,696	72.3	
Free Trade hold				

=== Sturt ===
1895 New South Wales colonial election: Sturt
Party	Candidate	Votes	%	±%
Labour	William Ferguson	unopposed		
Labour hold				

=== Sydney-Belmore ===
1895 New South Wales colonial election: Sydney-Belmore
Party	Candidate	Votes	%	±%
Free Trade	James Graham	674	56.2	
Protectionist	Francis Freehill	526	43.8	
Total formal votes		1,200	99.3	
Informal votes		8	0.7	
Turnout		1,208	64.8	
Free Trade hold				

=== Sydney-Bligh ===
1895 New South Wales colonial election: Sydney-Bligh
Party	Candidate	Votes	%	±%
Free Trade	James Harvey	515	46.7	
Protectionist	Patrick Quinn	317	28.8	
Ind. Free Trade	James Martin	257	23.3	
Labour	Reginald Daly	13	1.2	
Total formal votes		1,102	99.2	
Informal votes		9	0.8	
Turnout		1,111	59.4	
Free Trade hold				

=== Sydney-Cook ===
1895 New South Wales colonial election: Sydney-Cook
Party	Candidate	Votes	%	±%
Free Trade	Samuel Whiddon	586	54.8	
Protectionist	William Traill	484	45.2	
Total formal votes		1,070	99.8	
Informal votes		2	0.2	
Turnout		1,072	63.4	
Free Trade hold				

=== Sydney-Denison ===
1895 New South Wales colonial election: Sydney-Denison
Party	Candidate	Votes	%	±%
Free Trade	Matthew Harris	674	61.6	
Protectionist	Henry Macnamara	421	38.5	
Total formal votes		1,095	99.2	
Informal votes		9	0.8	
Turnout		1,104	62.7	
Free Trade hold				

=== Sydney-Fitzroy ===
1895 New South Wales colonial election: Sydney-Fitzroy
Party	Candidate	Votes	%	±%
Ind. Free Trade	John McElhone	624	46.0	
Free Trade	Henry Chapman	488	36.0	
Independent	Henry Harris	163	12.0	
Labour	Henry Cato	82	6.0	
Total formal votes		1,357	99.3	
Informal votes		9	0.7	
Turnout		1,366	63.3	
Ind. Free Trade gain from Free Trade				

=== Sydney-Flinders ===
1895 New South Wales colonial election: Sydney-Flinders
Party	Candidate	Votes	%	±%
Protectionist	Arthur Nelson	333	32.1	
Independent	Bernhard Wise (defeated)	296	28.6	
Free Trade	John Waine	278	26.8	
Labour	John Buckley	118	11.4	
Ind. Free Trade	Eden George	11	1.1	
Total formal votes		1,036	98.7	
Informal votes		14	1.3	
Turnout		1,050	58.4	
Protectionist gain from Free Trade				

=== Sydney-Gipps ===
1895 New South Wales colonial election: Sydney-Gipps
Party	Candidate	Votes	%	±%
Labour	George Black	750	57.5	
Independent	Daniel O'Connor	555	42.5	
Total formal votes		1,305	99.4	
Informal votes		8	0.6	
Turnout		1,313	64.8	
Member changed to Labour from Independent Labour				

=== Sydney-King ===
1895 New South Wales colonial election: Sydney-King
Party	Candidate	Votes	%	±%
Free Trade	George Reid	610	56.1	
Independent	Henry Parkes	478	43.9	
Total formal votes		1,088	99.5	
Informal votes		5	0.5	
Turnout		1,093	59.2	
Free Trade hold				

=== Sydney-Lang ===
1895 New South Wales colonial election: Sydney-Lang
Party	Candidate	Votes	%	±%
Labour	Billy Hughes	525	58.7	
Ind. Free Trade	John Taylor	283	31.6	
Ind. Protectionist	Henry Foran	45	5.0	
Ind. Free Trade	John Anderson	42	4.7	
Total formal votes		895	98.6	
Informal votes		13	1.4	
Turnout		908	55.9	
Labour hold				

=== Sydney-Phillip ===
1895 New South Wales colonial election: Sydney-Phillip
Party	Candidate	Votes	%	±%
Protectionist	Dick Meagher	655	54.7	
Free Trade	Robert Fowler	542	45.3	
Total formal votes		1,197	99.3	
Informal votes		8	0.7	
Turnout		1,205	61.8	
Protectionist gain from Free Trade				

=== Sydney-Pyrmont ===
1895 New South Wales colonial election: Sydney-Pyrmont
Party	Candidate	Votes	%	±%
Labour	Thomas Davis	477	47.6	
Ind. Free Trade	John Carter	374	37.3	
Ind. Protectionist	Cyrus Fuller	141	14.1	
Independent	Thomas Houghton	5	0.5	
Ind. Protectionist	George Perry	5	0.5	
Total formal votes		1,002	97.9	
Informal votes		22	2.2	
Turnout		1,024	59.4	
Labour hold				

=== Tamworth ===
1895 New South Wales colonial election: Tamworth
Party	Candidate	Votes	%	±%
Free Trade	Albert Piddington	621	52.6	
Protectionist	George Dibbs	559	47.4	
Total formal votes		1,180	99.4	
Informal votes		7	0.6	
Turnout		1,187	70.4	
Free Trade gain from Protectionist				

=== Tenterfield ===
1895 New South Wales colonial election: Tenterfield
Party	Candidate	Votes	%	±%
Free Trade	Charles Lee	805	67.6	
Protectionist	John Coxall	386	32.4	
Total formal votes		1,191	99.8	
Informal votes		3	0.3	
Turnout		1,194	69.5	
Free Trade hold				

=== Tumut ===
1895 New South Wales colonial election: Tumut
Party	Candidate	Votes	%	±%
Protectionist	Travers Jones	469	35.6	
Free Trade	John Channon	469	35.6	
Ind. Free Trade	Nathaniel Emanuel	208	15.8	
Ind. Protectionist	Robert Newman	170	12.9	
Total formal votes		1,316	98.6	
Informal votes		19	1.4	
Turnout		1,335	74.7	
Protectionist hold				

As this was a tied result, the returning officer had a casting vote and chose Travers Jones. The Elections and Qualifications Committee conducted a recount with the results as follows.

1895 Tumut re-count
Party	Candidate	Votes	%	±%
Protectionist	Travers Jones	476	36.3	
Free Trade	John Channon	461	35.1	
Ind. Free Trade	Nathaniel Emanuel	204	15.5	
Ind. Protectionist	Robert Newman	172	13.1	
Total formal votes		1,313	97.9	
Informal votes		28	2.1	
Turnout		1,341	75.0	
Protectionist hold				

=== The Tweed ===
1895 New South Wales colonial election: The Tweed
Party	Candidate	Votes	%	±%
Protectionist	Joseph Kelly	445	51.9	
Ind. Protectionist	Norman Ewing	234	27.3	
Labour	Samuel Rosa	170	19.8	
Free Trade	William Baker	6	0.7	
Ind. Protectionist	George Halliday	2	0.2	
Ind. Protectionist	John Morrison	1	0.1	
Total formal votes		858	98.6	
Informal votes		12	1.4	
Turnout		870	47.9	
Protectionist hold				

=== Uralla-Walcha ===
1895 New South Wales colonial election: Uralla-Walcha
Party	Candidate	Votes	%	±%
Free Trade	William Piddington	557	66.2	
Protectionist	James Proctor	285	33.9	
Total formal votes		842	97.1	
Informal votes		25	2.9	
Turnout		867	52.0	
Member changed to Free Trade from Ind. Free Trade				

=== Wagga Wagga ===
1895 New South Wales colonial election: Wagga Wagga
Party	Candidate	Votes	%	±%
Protectionist	James Gormly	648	65.8	
Free Trade	Thomas Halloran	337	34.2	
Total formal votes		985	98.8	
Informal votes		12	1.2	
Turnout		997	57.4	
Protectionist hold				

=== Wallsend ===
1895 New South Wales colonial election: Wallsend
Party	Candidate	Votes	%	±%
Labour	David Watkins	988	65.2	
Protectionist	Thomas Walker	527	34.8	
Total formal votes		1,515	99.3	
Informal votes		11	0.7	
Turnout		1,526	76.5	
Labour hold				

=== Waratah ===
1895 New South Wales colonial election: Waratah
Party	Candidate	Votes	%	±%
Labour	Arthur Griffith	854	53.3	
Protectionist	Ninian Melville	661	41.3	
Ind. Free Trade	William Conn	83	5.2	
Independent Labour	James McWilliams	4	0.3	
Total formal votes		1,602	98.0	
Informal votes		33	2.0	
Turnout		1,635	78.1	
Labour hold				

=== Warringah ===
1895 New South Wales colonial election: Warringah
Party	Candidate	Votes	%	±%
Free Trade	Dugald Thomson	629	55.2	
Ind. Free Trade	Henry Moss	510	44.8	
Total formal votes		1,139	99.6	
Informal votes		5	0.4	
Turnout		1,144	66.2	
Free Trade hold				

=== Waterloo ===
1895 New South Wales colonial election: Waterloo
Party	Candidate	Votes	%	±%
Free Trade	George Anderson	799	46.8	
Labour	Ernest Banner	471	27.6	
Protectionist	John Norton	437	25.6	
Total formal votes		1,707	99.7	
Informal votes		5	0.3	
Turnout		1,712	72.5	
Free Trade hold				

=== Waverley ===
1895 New South Wales colonial election: Waverley
Party	Candidate	Votes	%	±%
Free Trade	Angus Cameron	622	43.5	
Protectionist	Thomas Barlow	466	32.6	
Ind. Free Trade	Alfred Allen	298	20.8	
Ind. Protectionist	William Allen	45	3.1	
Total formal votes		1,431	99.2	
Informal votes		12	0.8	
Turnout		1,443	64.4	
Free Trade hold				

=== Wellington ===
1895 New South Wales colonial election: Wellington
Party	Candidate	Votes	%	±%
Free Trade	John Haynes	1,035	60.9	
Protectionist	Louis Veech	666	39.2	
Total formal votes		1,701	99.3	
Informal votes		12	0.7	
Turnout		1,713	66.2	
Free Trade hold				

=== Wentworth ===
1895 New South Wales colonial election: Wentworth
Party	Candidate	Votes	%	±%
Protectionist	Sir Joseph Abbott	515	65.9	
Labour	Robert Scobie	266	34.1	
Total formal votes		781	98.9	
Informal votes		9	1.1	
Turnout		790	51.0	
Protectionist hold				

=== West Macquarie ===
1895 New South Wales colonial election: West Macquarie
Party	Candidate	Votes	%	±%
Protectionist	Paddy Crick	876	55.0	
Free Trade	John Hurley	716	45.0	
Total formal votes		1,592	98.9	
Informal votes		18	1.1	
Turnout		1,610	61.4	
Protectionist hold				

=== West Maitland ===
1895 New South Wales colonial election: West Maitland
Party	Candidate	Votes	%	±%
Free Trade	John Gillies	890	80.5	
Ind. Protectionist	Richard Proctor	215	19.5	
Total formal votes		1,105	99.1	
Informal votes		10	0.9	
Turnout		1,115	47.3	
Member changed to Free Trade from Ind. Free Trade				

=== Wickham ===
1895 New South Wales colonial election: Wickham
Party	Candidate	Votes	%	±%
Free Trade	John Fegan	803	57.2	
Labour	William Webster	600	42.8	
Total formal votes		1,403	99.8	
Informal votes		3	0.2	
Turnout		1,406	77.4	
Free Trade hold				

=== Wilcannia ===
1895 New South Wales colonial election: Wilcannia
Party	Candidate	Votes	%	±%
Labour	Richard Sleath	unopposed		
Labour hold				

=== Willoughby ===
1895 New South Wales colonial election: Willoughby
Party	Candidate	Votes	%	±%
Free Trade	George Howarth	850	55.9	
Ind. Free Trade	Joseph Cullen	574	37.7	
Protectionist	William Richardson	97	6.4	
Total formal votes		1,521	99.2	
Informal votes		13	0.9	
Turnout		1,534	64.7	
Free Trade hold				

=== Woollahra ===
1895 New South Wales colonial election: Woollahra
Party	Candidate	Votes	%	±%
Free Trade	Adrian Knox	769	65.6	
Ind. Protectionist	John Gannon	324	27.6	
Ind. Free Trade	William Harding	80	6.8	
Total formal votes		1,173	99.2	
Informal votes		10	0.9	
Turnout		1,183	54.9	
Free Trade hold				

=== Woronora ===
1895 New South Wales colonial election: Woronora
Party	Candidate	Votes	%	±%
Independent Labour	John Nicholson	930	67.8	
Ind. Free Trade	Thomas Bissell	442	32.2	
Total formal votes		1,372	99.0	
Informal votes		14	1.0	
Turnout		1,386	71.5	
Independent Labour hold				

=== Yass ===
1895 New South Wales colonial election: Yass
Party	Candidate	Votes	%	±%
Free Trade	William Affleck	631	54.8	
Protectionist	Thomas Colls	520	45.2	
Total formal votes		1,151	99.1	
Informal votes		11	1.0	
Turnout		1,162	65.1	
Free Trade hold				

=== Young ===
1895 New South Wales colonial election: Young
Party	Candidate	Votes	%	±%
Labour	Chris Watson	900	57.8	
Protectionist	John Forsythe	656	42.2	
Total formal votes		1,556	99.2	
Informal votes		12	0.8	
Turnout		1,568	68.7	
Labour hold				

== See also ==
- Candidates of the 1895 New South Wales colonial election
- Members of the New South Wales Legislative Assembly, 1895–1898
