= Electoral results for the district of Gunnedah =

Election results for Gunnedah, New South Wales, Australia

Gunnedah, an electoral district of the Legislative Assembly in the Australian state of New South Wales was created in 1880 and abolished in 1904.

Election	Member	Party
1880	Joseph Abbott	None
1882	Joseph Abbott	None
1885	Joseph Abbott	None
1887	Thomas Goodwin	Protectionist
1888 by	Edwin Turner	Free Trade
1889	Edwin Turner	Free Trade
1891	John Kirkpatrick	Labour
1894	John Kirkpatrick	Labour
1895	Thomas Goodwin	Protectionist
1898	Thomas Goodwin	Protectionist
1901	David Hall	Labour

== Election results ==
=== Elections in the 1900s ===
==== 1901 ====
1901 New South Wales state election: Gunnedah
Party	Candidate	Votes	%	±%
Labour	David Hall	1,008		+61.2
Liberal Reform	Thomas Wills-Allen	639	38.8	+13.5
Total formal votes		1,647	99.3	+0.6
Informal votes		11	0.7	−0.6
Turnout		1,658	60.4	11.4
Labour gain from Progressive				

The sitting member Thomas Goodwin (Progressive) did not contest the election.

=== Elections in the 1890s ===
==== 1898 ====
1898 New South Wales colonial election: Gunnedah
Party	Candidate	Votes	%	±%
National Federal	Thomas Goodwin	631	62.5	
Free Trade	John Kirkpatrick	256	25.4	
Independent Federalist	William Case	123	12.2	
Total formal votes		1,010	98.7	
Informal votes		13	1.3	
Turnout		1,023	49.0	
National Federal hold				

==== 1895 ====
1895 New South Wales colonial election: Gunnedah
Party	Candidate	Votes	%	±%
Protectionist	Thomas Goodwin	649	59.1	
Labour	Samuel Hutchin	422	38.4	
Ind. Free Trade	John Rogers	28	2.6	
Total formal votes		1,099	98.2	
Informal votes		20	1.8	
Turnout		1,119	59.8	
Protectionist gain from Labour				

==== 1894 ====
1894 New South Wales colonial election: Gunnedah
Party	Candidate	Votes	%	±%
Labour	John Kirkpatrick	674	54.8	
Protectionist	Job Sheldon	477	38.8	
Ind. Free Trade	Silas Rose	42	3.4	
Ind. Protectionist	George Birney	26	2.1	
Ind. Free Trade	Jonathan Rendalls	10	0.8	
Total formal votes		1,229	97.9	
Informal votes		27	2.2	
Turnout		1,256	66.8	
Labour hold				

==== 1891 ====
1891 New South Wales colonial election: Gunnedah Saturday 27 June
Party	Candidate	Votes	%	±%
Labour	John Kirkpatrick (elected)	659	54.9	
Protectionist	Thomas Browne	407	33.9	
Protectionist	Michael Burke	76	6.3	
Protectionist	Robert Doolan	58	4.8	
Total formal votes		1,200	96.5	
Informal votes		43	3.5	
Turnout		1,243	53.6	
Labour gain from Free Trade				

=== Elections in the 1880s ===
==== 1889 ====
1889 New South Wales colonial election: Gunnedah Saturday 9 February
Party	Candidate	Votes	%	±%
Free Trade	Edwin Turner (elected)	658	58.2	
Protectionist	Harold Tilley	472	41.8	
Total formal votes		1,130	95.4	
Informal votes		55	4.6	
Turnout		1,185	59.8	
Free Trade gain from Protectionist				

Edwin Turner (Free Trade) won the seat at a by-election in 1888 and retained it at this election.

==== 1888 by-election ====
1888 Gunnedah by-election Wednesday 12 September
Party	Candidate	Votes	%	±%
Free Trade	Edwin Turner (elected)	475	57.9	
Protectionist	William Poole	346	42.1	
Total formal votes		821	100.0	
Informal votes		0	0.0	
Turnout		821	41.4	
Free Trade gain from Protectionist				

The by-election was caused by the resignation of Thomas Goodwin (Protectionist).

==== 1887 ====
1887 New South Wales colonial election: Gunnedah Wednesday 16 February
Party	Candidate	Votes	%	±%
Protectionist	Thomas Goodwin (elected)	616	62.7	
Free Trade	J Poole	367	37.3	
Total formal votes		983	95.4	
Informal votes		47	4.6	
Turnout		1,030	50.3	

The sitting member Joseph Abbott successfully contested Wentworth.

==== 1885 ====
1885 New South Wales colonial election: Gunnedah Monday 19 October
Candidate	Votes	%
Joseph Abbott (re-elected)	706	59.7
Ethelbert Clemesha	476	40.3
Total formal votes	1,182	96.7
Informal votes	41	3.4
Turnout	1,223	62.6

==== 1882 ====
1882 New South Wales colonial election: Gunnedah Wednesday 20 December
Candidate	Votes	%
Joseph Abbott (re-elected)	616	79.3
William Douglass	161	20.7
Total formal votes	777	95.9
Informal votes	33	4.1
Turnout	837	40.1

==== 1880 ====
1880 New South Wales colonial election: Gunnedah Monday 29 November
Candidate	Votes	%
Joseph Abbott (elected)	714	61.1
Thomas Browne	454	38.9
Total formal votes	1,168	97.5
Informal votes	30	2.5
Turnout	1,198	62.5
	(new seat)	
