= Electoral results for the district of Cowra =

Election results for Cowra, New South Wales, Australia

Cowra was an electoral district of the Legislative Assembly in the Australian state of New South Wales from 1894 to 1904.

Election	Member	Party
1894	Denis Donnelly	Protectionist
1895	Denis Donnelly	Protectionist
1896 by	Michael Phillips	Protectionist
1898	Thomas Waddell	National Federal
1901	Thomas Waddell	Progressive

== Election results ==
=== Elections in the 1900s ===
==== 1901 ====
1901 New South Wales state election: Cowra
Party	Candidate	Votes	%	±%
Progressive	Thomas Waddell	unopposed		
Progressive hold				

=== Elections in the 1890s ===
==== 1898 ====
1898 New South Wales colonial election: Cowra
Party	Candidate	Votes	%	±%
National Federal	Thomas Waddell	830	58.8	
Labour	Hector Lamond	581	41.2	
Total formal votes		1,411	99.3	
Informal votes		10	0.7	
Turnout		1,421	61.0	
National Federal hold				

==== 1896 by-election ====
1896 Cowra by-election Thursday 2 April
Party	Candidate	Votes	%	±%
Protectionist	Michael Phillips	759	61.4	
Labor	Hector Lamond	477	38.6	
Total formal votes		1,236	99.5	
Informal votes		6	0.5	
Turnout		1,242	60.1	
Protectionist hold				

The by-election was caused by the death of Denis Donnelly (Protectionist).

==== 1895 ====
1895 New South Wales colonial election: Cowra
Party	Candidate	Votes	%	±%
Protectionist	Denis Donnelly	669	51.2	
Labour	Linus Bungate	456	34.9	
Free Trade	William Cortis	149	11.4	
Ind. Protectionist	Edward Bassett	32	2.5	
Total formal votes		1,306	98.5	
Informal votes		20	1.5	
Turnout		1,326	69.8	
Protectionist hold				

==== 1894 ====
1894 New South Wales colonial election: Cowra
Party	Candidate	Votes	%	±%
Protectionist	Denis Donnelly	619	43.4	
Labour	Linus Bungate	582	40.8	
Free Trade	Hector Lamond	224	15.7	
Total formal votes		1,425	97.4	
Informal votes		38	2.6	
Turnout		1,463	76.9	
Protectionist win		(new seat)		
