= Electoral results for the district of Rylstone =

Election results for Rylstone, New South Wales, Australia

Rylstone, an electoral district of the Legislative Assembly in the Australian state of New South Wales was created in 1894 and abolished in 1904.

Election	Member	Party
1894	William Wall	Protectionist
1895	John Fitzpatrick	Free Trade
1895 by	John Fitzpatrick	Free Trade
1898	John Fitzpatrick	Free Trade
1901	John Fitzpatrick	Liberal Reform

== Election results ==
=== Elections in the 1900s ===
==== 1901 ====
1901 New South Wales state election: Rylstone
Party	Candidate	Votes	%	±%
Liberal Reform	John Fitzpatrick	932	62.5	+8.3
Progressive	Thomas Arkins	559	37.5	−8.3
Total formal votes		1,491	100.0	+0.7
Informal votes		0	0.0	−0.7
Turnout		1,491	60.1	−4.9
Liberal Reform hold				

=== Elections in the 1890s ===
==== 1898 ====
1898 New South Wales colonial election: Rylstone
Party	Candidate	Votes	%	±%
Free Trade	John Fitzpatrick	753	54.2	
National Federal	Jack FitzGerald	636	45.8	
Total formal votes		1,389	99.3	
Informal votes		10	0.7	
Turnout		1,399	65.0	
Free Trade hold				

==== 1895 by-election ====
1895 Rylstone by-election Monday 14 October
Party	Candidate	Votes	%	±%
Free Trade	John Fitzpatrick (elected)	659	51.4	
Protectionist	William Wall	608	47.5	
Independent Labour	Thomas Williams (Note: Thomas Williams withdrew prior to the poll.)	14	1.1	
Total formal votes		1,281	97.9	
Informal votes		28	2.1	
Turnout		1,309	69.6 (Note: Estimate based on a roll of 1,882 at the July 1895 election.)	
Free Trade gain from Protectionist				

The election for Rylstone in July was declared void.

==== 1895 ====
1895 New South Wales colonial election: Rylstone
Party	Candidate	Votes	%	±%
Free Trade	John Fitzpatrick	513	50.3	
Protectionist	William Wall	507	49.7	
Total formal votes		1,020	99.2	
Informal votes		8	0.8	
Turnout		1,028	54.6	
Free Trade gain from Protectionist				

==== 1894 ====
1894 New South Wales colonial election: Rylstone
Party	Candidate	Votes	%	±%
Protectionist	William Wall	677	50.7	
Ind. Protectionist	James Granter	211	15.8	
Labour	Francis Gilbert	210	15.7	
Free Trade	J Hill	100	7.5	
Independent	Thomas Hungerford	68	5.1	
Ind. Free Trade	James Purser	57	4.3	
Ind. Free Trade	James Taylor	13	1.0	
Total formal votes		1,336	97.3	
Informal votes		37	2.7	
Turnout		1,373	72.3	
Protectionist win		(new seat)		
