= Electoral results for the district of Eden-Bombala =

Election results for Eden-Bombala, New South Wales, Australia

Eden-Bombala, an electoral district of the Legislative Assembly in the Australian state of New South Wales, was created in 1894 and abolished in 1904.

Election	Member	Party
1894	William Wood	Independent Labour
1895	William Wood	Protectionist
1898	William Wood	National Federal
1901	William Wood	Independent

== Election results ==
=== Elections in the 1900s ===
==== 1901 ====
1901 New South Wales state election: Eden-Bombala
Party	Candidate	Votes	%	±%
Independent	William Wood	868	60.9	+4.0
Independent Liberal	Bernard McTernan	558	39.1	
Total formal votes		1,426	99.4	+1.4
Informal votes		8	0.6	−1.4
Turnout		1,434	62.8	−4.8
Member changed to Independent from Progressive				

=== Elections in the 1890s ===
==== 1898 ====
1898 New South Wales colonial election: Eden-Bombala
Party	Candidate	Votes	%	±%
National Federal	William Wood	777	56.9	
Independent Federalist	Henry Dawson	559	40.9	
Independent Federalist	Samuel Woods	30	2.2	
Total formal votes		1,366	98.0	
Informal votes		28	2.0	
Turnout		1,394	67.6	
National Federal hold				

==== 1895 ====
1895 New South Wales colonial election: Eden-Bombala
Party	Candidate	Votes	%	±%
Protectionist	William Wood	544	44.9	
Ind. Protectionist	Coulson Murphy	485	40.1	
Free Trade	John Griffin	182	15.0	
Total formal votes		1,211	99.3	
Informal votes		8	0.7	
Turnout		1,219	66.3	
Protectionist hold				

==== 1894 ====
1894 New South Wales colonial election: Eden-Bombala
Party	Candidate	Votes	%	±%
Independent Labour	William Wood	334	24.5	
Ind. Protectionist	Coulson Murphy	309	22.6	
Free Trade	David Myers	267	19.6	
Ind. Protectionist	Samuel Woods	181	13.3	
Ind. Protectionist	Edmund Comans	162	11.9	
Independent	Charles Stiles	74	5.4	
Ind. Protectionist	Maurice Roche	20	1.5	
Independent	John O'Reilly	12	0.9	
Independent	Moses Cohen	7	0.5	
Total formal votes		1,366	88.4	
Informal votes		179	11.6	
Turnout		1,545	81.8	
Independent Labour win		(new seat)		
