= 1888 Gunnedah colonial by-election =

By-election in New South Wales, Australia

A by-election was held for the New South Wales Legislative Assembly electorate of Gunnedah on 12 September 1888 because of the resignation of Thomas Goodwin (Protectionist).

== Dates ==
Date	Event
24 August 1888	Thomas Goodwin resigned.
30 August 1888	Writ of election issued by the Speaker of the Legislative Assembly.
6 September 1888	Nominations
12 September 1888	Polling day
24 September 1888	Return of writ

== Result ==
1888 Gunnedah by-election Wednesday 12 September
Party	Candidate	Votes	%	±%
Free Trade	Edwin Turner (elected)	475	57.9	
Protectionist	William Poole	346	42.1	
Total formal votes		821	100.0	
Informal votes		0	0.0	
Turnout		821	41.4	
Free Trade gain from Protectionist				

== See also ==
- Electoral results for the district of Gunnedah
- List of New South Wales state by-elections
