= Electoral results for the district of Sydney-Flinders =

Election results for Sydney-Flinders, New South Wales, Australia

Sydney-Flinders, an electoral district of the Legislative Assembly in the Australian state of New South Wales, was created in 1894 and abolished in 1904.

Election	Member	Party
1894	Bernhard Wise	Free Trade
1895	Arthur Nelson	Protectionist
1898	Arthur Nelson	Protectionist
1901	Arthur Nelson	Progressive

== Election results ==
=== Elections in the 1900s ===
==== 1901 ====
1901 New South Wales state election: Sydney-Flinders
Party	Candidate	Votes	%	±%
Progressive	Arthur Nelson	601	34.9	−13.2
Liberal Reform	John Waine	598	34.8	−3.2
Ind. Progressive	Ernest Gardner	191	11.1	+2.1
Independent Liberal	Hezekiah Evers	124	7.2	
Ind. Progressive	James Lawrence	124	7.2	
Labour	Frederick Sommerhoff	82	4.8	-0.0
Total formal votes		1,720	99.2	+0.2
Informal votes		14	0.8	−0.2
Turnout		1,734	75.8	+23.4
Progressive hold				

=== Elections in the 1890s ===
==== 1898 ====
1898 New South Wales colonial election: Sydney-Flinders
Party	Candidate	Votes	%	±%
National Federal	Arthur Nelson	543	48.2	
Free Trade	John Dobbie	428	38.0	
Independent Federalist	Ernest Gardner	102	9.1	
Labour	Robert Cropley	54	4.8	
Independent	William Gocher	0	0.0	
Total formal votes		1,127	99.0	
Informal votes		12	1.1	
Turnout		1,139	52.4	
National Federal hold				

==== 1895 ====
1895 New South Wales colonial election: Sydney-Flinders
Party	Candidate	Votes	%	±%
Protectionist	Arthur Nelson	333	32.1	
Independent	Bernhard Wise (defeated)	296	28.6	
Free Trade	John Waine	278	26.8	
Labour	John Buckley	118	11.4	
Ind. Free Trade	Eden George	11	1.1	
Total formal votes		1,036	98.7	
Informal votes		14	1.3	
Turnout		1,050	58.4	
Protectionist gain from Free Trade				

==== 1894 ====
1894 New South Wales colonial election: Sydney-Flinders
Party	Candidate	Votes	%	±%
Free Trade	Bernhard Wise	656	45.8	
Labour	John Dobbie	379	26.5	
Protectionist	William Kippax	286	20.0	
Ind. Free Trade	Joseph Olliffe	77	5.4	
Ind. Protectionist	Leighton Kesteven	34	2.4	
Total formal votes		1,432	98.7	
Informal votes		19	1.3	
Turnout		1,451	79.0	
Free Trade win		(new seat)		
