= 1896 Cowra colonial by-election =

Election result for Cowra, New South Wales, Australia

A by-election was held for the New South Wales Legislative Assembly electorate of Cowra on 2 April 1896 because of the death of Denis Donnelly (Protectionist).

== Dates ==
Date	Event
14 March 1896	Denis Donnelly died.
19 March 1896	Writ of election issued by the Speaker of the Legislative Assembly.
27 March 1896	Nominations
2 April 1896	Polling day, between the hours of 8 am and 8 pm
20 April 1896	Return of writ

== Result ==
1896 Cowra by-election Thursday 2 April
Party	Candidate	Votes	%	±%
Protectionist	Michael Phillips	759	61.4	
Labor	Hector Lamond	477	38.6	
Total formal votes		1,236	99.5	
Informal votes		6	0.5	
Turnout		1,242	60.1	
Protectionist hold				

== See also ==
- Electoral results for the district of Cowra
- List of New South Wales state by-elections
