= 1895 Rylstone colonial by-election =

By-election in New South Wales, Australia

← 1895	14 October 1895	1898 →

Electoral district of Rylstone in the Legislative Assembly of New South Wales
- Turnout: 69.6%
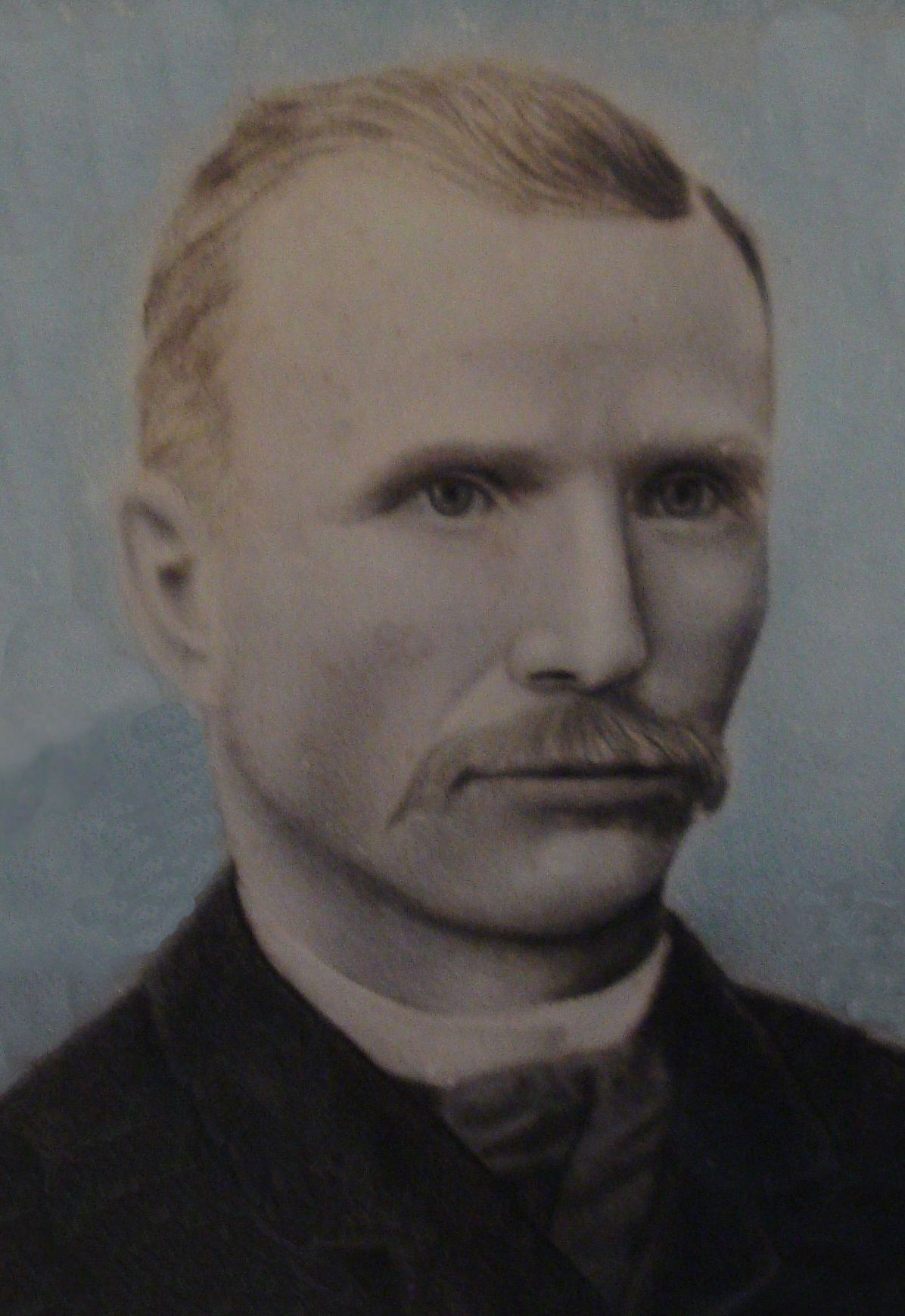
	Majority party	Minority party
	FTP
Candidate	John Fitzpatrick	William Wall
Party	Free Trade	Protectionist
Popular vote	659	608
Percentage	51.4%	47.5%
MP before election
John Fitzpatrick
Free Trade
Elected MP
John Fitzpatrick
Free Trade

A by-election for the seat of Rylstone in the New South Wales Legislative Assembly was held on 14 October 1895 because the Committee of Elections and Qualifications declared that the election of John Fitzpatrick at the election for Rylstone in July, with a margin of 6 votes, was void because of gross negligence by the returning officer by not initialing 266 ballot papers (19.6%).

== Dates ==
Date	Event
24 July 1895	Rylstone election.
3 September 1895	William Wall filed a petition against the election.
18 September 1895	Rylstone election declared void.
24 September 1895	Writ of election issued by the Speaker of the Legislative Assembly.
3 October 1895	Nominations
14 October 1895	Polling day
31 October 1895	Return of writ

== Result ==
1895 Rylstone by-election Monday 14 October
Party	Candidate	Votes	%	±%
Free Trade	John Fitzpatrick (elected)	659	51.4	
Protectionist	William Wall	608	47.5	
Independent Labour	Thomas Williams (Note: Thomas Williams withdrew prior to the poll.)	14	1.1	
Total formal votes		1,281	97.9	
Informal votes		28	2.1	
Turnout		1,309	69.6 (Note: Estimate based on a roll of 1,882 at the July 1895 election.)	
Free Trade gain from Protectionist				

== See also ==
- Electoral results for the district of Rylstone
- List of New South Wales state by-elections
