= Hector Lamond =

Australian politician

The Honourable Hector Lamond
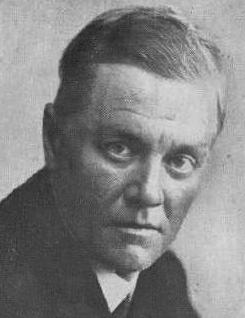

Member of the Australian Parliament for Illawarra
- In office 5 May 1917 – 16 December 1922
- Preceded by: George Burns
- Succeeded by: Seat abolished

Personal details
- Born: 31 October 1865 Berry, New South Wales
- Died: 26 April 1947 (aged 81) Bowral, New South Wales
- Party: Nationalist Party of Australia
- Spouse: Gwynetha Spence
- Occupation: Unionist, editor

Hector Lamond (31 October 1865 – 26 April 1947) was an Australian politician. He was a Nationalist Party member of the Australian House of Representatives from 1917 to 1922, representing the electorate of Illawarra.

== Early life and career ==
Lamond was born at Broughton Creek, near Berry, New South Wales and educated at public schools. He was apprenticed as a printer to the Carcoar Chronicle when he was 14 and was its editor at 25. He was involved in the establishment of the Australian Labor Party between 1895 and 1900. In 1902, he married Gwynetha, the daughter of Australian Workers' Union president, William Spence. From 1905 to 1916, he was editor and manager of the Australian Workers' Union's The Australian Worker. During World War I, he came to be opposed to labor radicalism, and in particular to the Industrial Workers of the World. He became a strong supporter of Billy Hughes, and followed him out of Labor and into the new Nationalist Party in the 1916 Labor split. As a supporter of conscription, he was obliged to resign from the Australian Worker.

Lamond made a succession of unsuccessful Labor candidacies between 1896 and 1914, for the New South Wales Legislative Assembly for Cowra at the 1894 election, 1896 by-election and 1898 election, and at the 1904 election for Goulburn, then for the Australian House of Representatives seat of Lang at the 1913 and 1914 elections.

== Political career ==
He won the seat of Illawarra as a Nationalist at the 1917 election, and was appointed assistant minister for repatriation in December 1921. The seat of Illawarra was abolished before the 1922 election and he stood unsuccessfully for Barton.

== Later life ==
In 1923 Lamond bought The Southern Mail and three other rural newspapers, which he edited and published in Bowral. He died at Bowral, survived by his wife, two sons and a daughter.

== Notes ==
Parliament of Australia
Preceded by George Burns	Member for Illawarra; 1917–1922	Division abolished
