= 1895 New South Wales colonial election =

Colonial election for New South Wales, Australia in July 1895

- 24 July 1895

All 125 seats in the New South Wales Legislative Assembly 63 Assembly seats were needed for a majority
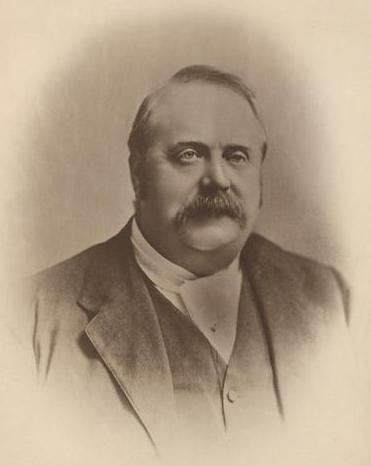

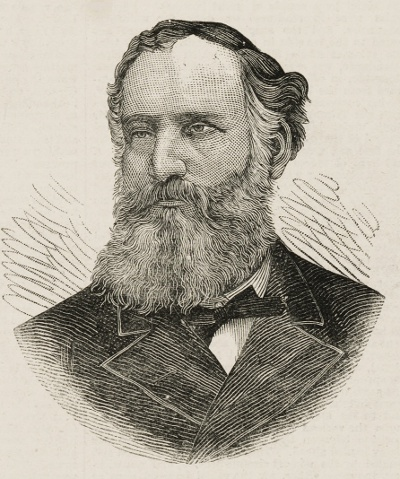

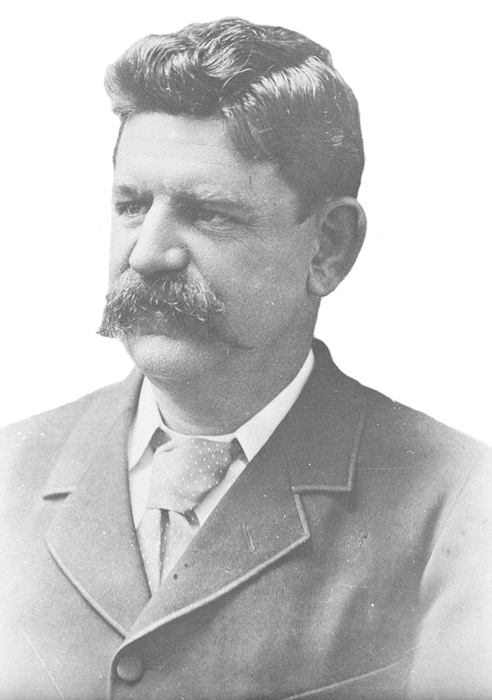
	First party	Second party	Third party
Leader	George Reid	George Dibbs	James McGowen
Party	Free Trade	Protectionist	Labor
Leader since	September 1891	January 1889	August 1894
Leader's seat	Sydney-King	Tamworth (lost seat)	Redfern
Last election	50 seats	37 seats	15 seats
Seats won	58 seats	42 seats	18 seats
Seat change	▲8	▲5	▲3
Percentage	37.15	33.43%	13.20%
Swing	▲6.81	▲5.74	▼3.29
- Results of the election, showing the winning vote share of the elected member.
Premier before election
George Reid
Free Trade
Premier after election
George Reid
Free Trade

The 1895 New South Wales colonial election was held on 24 July 1895 for all of the 125 seats in the seventeenth New South Wales Legislative Assembly. The election was conducted in single-member constituencies with a first-past-the-post voting system. Section 23 (1) of the Parliamentary Electorates and Elections Act of 1893 conferred a right to vote on 'every male person, being a natural born [British] subject, who shall have resided or had his principal place of abode in New South Wales for a continuous period of one year'. The sixteenth parliament of New South Wales was dissolved on 5 July 1895 by the Governor, Lord Hampden, on the advice of the Premier, George Reid.

== Key dates ==
Date	Event
5 July 1895	The Legislative Assembly was dissolved, and writs were issued by the Governor to proceed with an election.
16 – 20 July 1895	Nominations for candidates for the election closed at noon.
24 July 1895	Polling day.
13 August 1895	Opening of 17th Parliament.

== Results ==
New South Wales colonial election, 24 July 1895 Legislative Assembly << 1894–1898 >>
Enrolled voters	253,125				
Votes cast	151,680		Turnout	59.92	−18.64
Informal votes	1,354		Informal	0.88	−0.74
Summary of votes by party
Party	Primary votes	%	Swing	Seats	Change
Free Trade	56,347	37.15	+6.81	58	+8
Protectionist	50,703	33.43	+5.74	42	+5
Labor	20,028	13.20	−3.29	18	+3
Ind. Free Trade	11,096	7.32	–4.29	4	−7
Ind. Protectionist	6,547	4.32	−2.86	2	−2
Independent	5,107	3.37	+2.41	0	±0
Independent Labor	1,852	1.22	−4.50	1	−7
Total	151,680			125	

Popular vote
Free Trade	37.15%
Protectionist	33.43%
Labor	13.20%
Ind. Free Trade	7.32%
Ind. Protectionist	4.32%
Independent	3.37%
Ind. Labor	1.22%
Parliamentary seats
Free Trade	58
Protectionist	42
Labor	18
Ind. Free Trade	4
Ind. Protectionist	2
Ind. Labor	1

== Retiring members ==
=== Protectionist ===
- Patrick Hogan MLA (Raleigh)
- John Wilkinson MLA (Albury)

=== Free Trade ===
- Joseph Abbott MLA (Newtown-Camperdown)

=== Labor ===
- John Kirkpatrick MLA (Gunnedah)
- Michael Loughnane MLA (Grenfell)

== Changing seats ==
Seats changing hands (Note: Compares members at the 1894 election and the 1895 election and does not include seats that changed party as a result of a by-election.)
Seat	1894		1895	
Seat	Party	Member	Party	Member
Albury	Protectionist	John Wilkinson	Free Trade	Richard Ball
Armidale	Protectionist	Henry Copeland	Free Trade	Edmund Lonsdale
Ashburnham	Independent Labour	Albert Gardiner	Protectionist	Joseph Reymond
Botany	Ind. Free Trade	William Stephen	Labour	John Dacey
Camden	Protectionist	John Kidd	Free Trade	Charles Bull
Dubbo	Protectionist	James Morgan	Free Trade	Simeon Phillips
Gunnedah	Labour	John Kirkpatrick	Protectionist	Thomas Goodwin
Nepean	Free Trade	Samuel Lees	Protectionist	Thomas Smith
Newcastle West	Free Trade	James Ellis	Labour	James Thomson
Northumberland	Protectionist	Richard Stevenson	Free Trade	Henry Wheeler
Paddington	Free Trade	William Shipway	Ind. Free Trade	John Neild
Raleigh	Protectionist	Patrick Hogan	Ind. Protectionist	John McLaughlin
Rylstone	Protectionist	William Wall	Free Trade	John Fitzpatrick
Sydney-Fitzroy	Free Trade	Henry Chapman	Ind. Free Trade	John McElhone
Sydney-Flinders	Free Trade	Bernhard Wise	Protectionist	Arthur Nelson
Sydney-Phillip	Free Trade	Robert Fowler	Protectionist	Richard Meagher
Tamworth	Protectionist	George Dibbs	Free Trade	Albert Piddington
Tweed	Labour	John Willard	Protectionist	Joseph Kelly
Members changing party
Seat	1894		1895	
Seat	Party	Member	Party	Member
Condoublin	Independent Labour	Thomas Brown	Labour	Thomas Brown
Darlington	Independent Labour	William Schey	Protectionist	William Schey
Durham	Ind. Free Trade	Herbert Brown	Protectionist	Herbert Brown
Eden-Bombala	Independent Labour	William Wood	Protectionist	William Wood
Grenfell	Free Trade	George Greene	Ind. Free Trade	George Greene
Hartley	Independent Labour	Joseph Cook	Free Trade	Joseph Cook
Hawkesbury	Ind. Free Trade	William Morgan	Free Trade	William Morgan
Kahibah	Independent Labour	Alfred Edden	Labour	Alfred Edden
Kiama	Ind. Protectionist	Alexander Campbell	Protectionist	Alexander Campbell
Lachlan	Ind. Protectionist	James Carroll	Protectionist	James Carroll
Leichhardt	Ind. Free Trade	John Hawthorne	Free Trade	John Hawthorne
Macquarie	Free Trade	James Tonkin	Protectionist	William Hurley
Newtown-St Peters	Ind. Free Trade	William Rigg	Free Trade	William Rigg
Parramatta	Ind. Free Trade	Dowell O'Reilly	Free Trade	Dowell O'Reilly
Petersham	Ind. Free Trade	Llewellyn Jones	Free Trade	Llewellyn Jones
Richmond	Ind. Protectionist	Robert Pyers	Protectionist	Robert Pyers
Shoalhaven	Free Trade	Philip Morton	Ind. Free Trade	Philip Morton
Sydney-Gipps	Independent Labour	George Black	Labour	George Black
Uralla-Walcha	Ind. Free Trade	William Piddington	Free Trade	William Piddington
Waterloo	Ind. Free Trade	George Anderson	Free Trade	George Anderson
West Maitland	Ind. Free Trade	John Gillies	Free Trade	John Gillies
Woollahra	Ind. Free Trade	Adrian Knox	Free Trade	Adrian Knox

== See also ==
- Candidates of the 1895 New South Wales colonial election
- Members of the New South Wales Legislative Assembly, 1895–1898
