= Southern Highland News =

- Front cover of the newspaper The Southern Mail from 19 February 1889
- Founded: 1961
- Language: English

The Southern Highland News is a newspaper published since 1958 in Bowral, New South Wales, Australia. It has incorporated a number of other newspapers including The Southern Mail, The Robertson Mail, The Moss Vale Mail, The Mittagong Mail and The Mittagong Star.

== History ==
The Mittagong Mail was first published in 1885 by Daniel Beer. In 1886, Beer sold the newspaper to J. C. Murphy who changed the newspaper's name to The Southern Mail. Murphy began to publish The Robertson Advocate in 1887, The Moss Vale Record in 1888, and The Mittagong Express in 1891. By 1924, the four newspapers were owned by Hector Lamond who changed The Robertson Advocate to The Robertson Mail, The Moss Vale Record to The Moss Vale Mail and The Mittagong Express to The Mittagong Mail. The newspapers were referred to as the four Mails.

In 1958, Stan Lord launched the Southern Highland News to compete with the other newspapers in the region, Mac Cott, was the founding editor of the Southern Highland News. By 1960, Lord had sold his newspaper interests to his nephew, Colin Lord. In 1960, the proprietor of the four Mails, Hector Spence Lamond, sold them to Lord. At this point Lord incorporated The Mittagong Star, which he already owned, into The Mittagong Mail. The four Mails were then incorporated into the Southern Highland News in 1961.

The Southern Highland News is currently published by Fairfax Regional Media.

== Digitisation ==
Sections of the paper have been digitised as part of the Australian Newspapers Digitisation Program project of the National Library of Australia.

== See also ==
- List of newspapers in Australia
- List of newspapers in New South Wales
