= Lyndhurst Shire Chronicle =

Australian newspaper

Front page of the Lyndhurst Shire Chronicle on 1 March 1944

The Lyndhurst Shire Chronicle was a weekly newspaper published from 1897 - 2002 in Blayney, New South Wales, Australia.

== History ==
The Lyndhurst Shire Chronicle began publication in 1897 and was produced by Blayney Newspaper Co., Blayney NSW. The Lyndhurst Shire Chronicle absorbed the newspapers Carcoar Chronicle in 1943 and Blayney West Macquarie in 1973. In 2002 the Lyndhurst Shire Chronicle ceased publication and was continued by the Blayney Chronicle.

== Digitisation ==
The Lyndhurst Shire Chronicle has been partially digitised as part of the Australian Newspapers Digitisation Program of the National Library of Australia.

== See also ==
- List of newspapers in New South Wales
- List of newspapers in Australia
