= Blayney West Macquarie =

Defunct Australian newspaper

Blayney West Macquarie, was a weekly English language newspaper published in Blayney, New South Wales, Australia. The paper incorporated the Blayney Advocate, Blayney Argus and Carcoar Herald.

Front page of the Blayney West Macquarie, 9 February 1949

== History ==
Blayney West Macquarie commenced publication in the 1930s. It was published weekly by the Blayney Newspaper Company. The paper ceased publication on 23 December 1973, when it was absorbed by the Lyndhurst Shire Chronicle.

== Digitisation ==
Blayney West Macquarie has been partially digitised as part of the Australian Newspapers Digitisation Program of the National Library of Australia.

== See also ==
- List of newspapers in New South Wales
- List of newspapers in Australia
