= Carcoar Chronicle =

Former newspaper in New South Wales

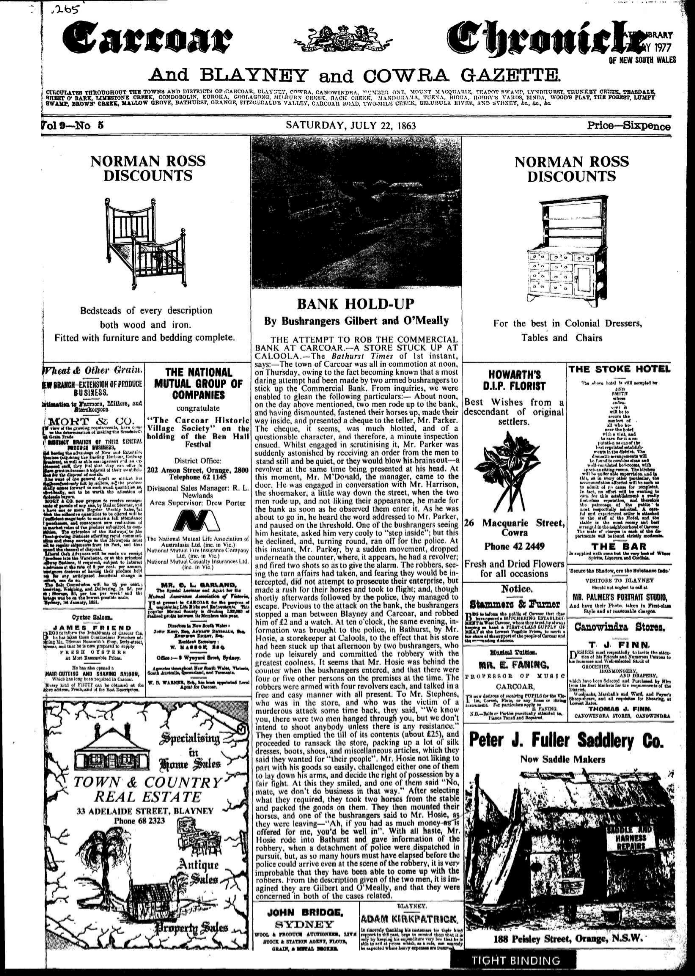
- Type: Daily newspaper
- Founded: 1863

The Carcoar Chronicle was a weekly newspaper published from 1863 to 1943 in Carcoar, New South Wales, Australia. It was also published as the Carcoar Chronicle and Blayney and Cowra Gazette, Carcoar Chronicle and Mandurama, Lyndhurst, Galley Swamp, Garland, Burnt Yards, Neville, Flyers's Creek, Forest Reefs, Woodstock and Blayney Herald and Carcoar Chronicle and Agricultural and Mining Journal.

== History ==
The Carcoar Chronicle was first published in 1863. Mary Boyle (later Garland) was proprietor and editor of the paper from 1880 to 1890. In 1887 it incorporated the Mount McDonald Miner. The paper ceased in 1943 and was continued by the Lyndhurst Shire Chronicle.

== Digitisation ==
The paper has been digitised as part of the Australian Newspapers Digitisation Program project of the National Library of Australia.

== See also ==
- List of newspapers in Australia
- List of newspapers in New South Wales
