= James Blanksby =

Australian politician

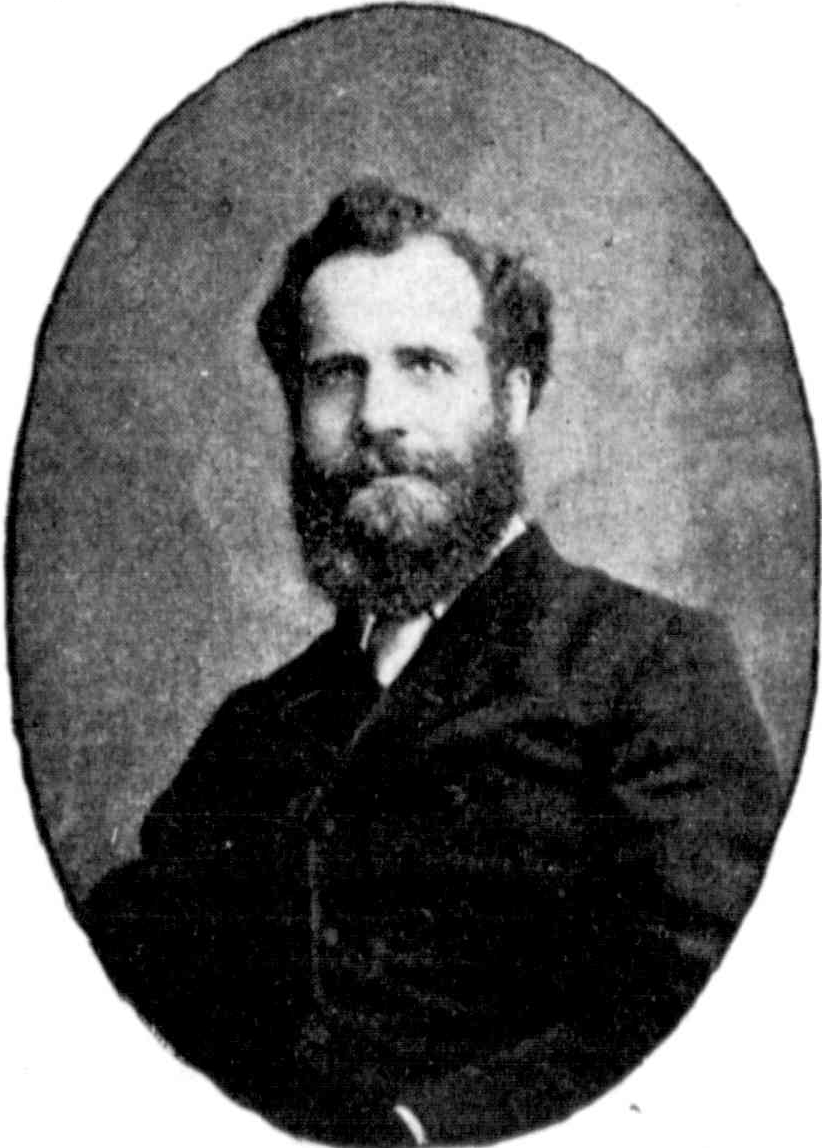

James Blanksby (1857 – 5 February 1924) was an Australian politician.

He was born in Burwood in Victoria to blacksmith William Blanksby and Millicent Holmes. He was a minister in the Primitive Methodist Church. On 11 April 1883 he married Elizabeth Irvine Penman, with whom he had six children. He resigned from the ministry to unsuccessfully run for the New South Wales Legislative Assembly seat of Newcastle West at the 1894 election, finishing 3rd with a margin of 160 votes (11.8%). He ran again 1895 election, but was narrowly defeated by the Labour candidate with a margin of 12 votes (1.1%). Later that year he became the manager of the Newcastle and Country Building Society, and was appointed to the New South Wales Legislative Council. He was generally considered a Free Trader, although one with Labour sympathies. He resigned from the Council in 1901 in order to become Secretary to the Miners' Accident Relief Board, a position he held until 1920. Blanksby died in Lakemba in 1924.
