= John Kirkpatrick (politician) =

Australian politician

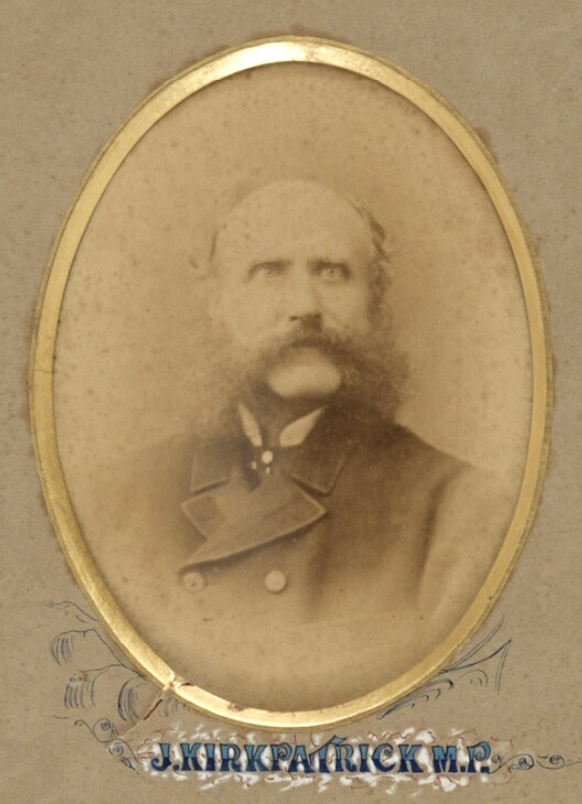

Member for Gunnedah (NSW Legislative Assembly)
- In office 27 June 1891 – 25 June 1894

Member for Gunnedah (NSW Legislative Assembly)
- In office 17 June 1894 – 25 July 1895

Personal details
- Born: 1839-40 Dumfriesshire, Scotland
- Died: 8 December 1904 (aged 64) Gunnedah, New South Wales
- Spouse: Bridget Annie Strong
- Parents: Simon Kirkpatrick (father); Elizabeth (née ---) (mother)

John Kirkpatrick (1840 – 8 December 1904) was a Scottish-born Australian politician.

Kirkpatrick emigrated to New Zealand as a young man. He engaged in various occupations, including as a miner on the West Coast goldfields and later as a cotton-grower in Fiji. He arrived in Australia in 1871, spending time on the Gulgong goldfields and as a storekeeper at Coonabarabran, before settling at Gunnedah. From June 1891 to July 1895, Kirkpatrick represented the electorate of Gunnedah in the New South Wales Legislative Assembly, elected as a Labour Electoral League candidate (in the initial group of Labor Party members). He contested the 1898 general election as a Free Trade candidate but failed to win the seat.

== Biography ==
=== Early years ===
John Kirkpatrick was born in 1840 at Lockerbie in Dumfriesshire, Scotland, the son of Simon and Elizabeth Kirkpatrick. He received his initial education at the local parish school.

In about 1850, when he was aged ten, young John was sent to an uncle in Glasgow where he completed his schooling. His uncle was a tailor and "had his nephew apprenticed to him with a view to him succeeding to the business". After serving his apprenticeship Kirkpatrick took a job as a fabric cutter.

=== New Zealand and Fiji ===
Kirkpatrick was "dissatisfied with life at home" and accepted the offer of a situation in New Zealand on a salary of four hundred pounds a year. He sailed for the colony in 1862. After completing the engagement, he started in business on his own account at Lyttelton on the east coast of the South Island.

After gold was discovered in the West Coast region region of the South Island, Kirkpatrick decided to join the rush and became a goldminer at the diggings, a life he followed for several years "with fair success".^{[A]}

After the decline of the West Coast goldrush, Kirkpatrick travelled to the North Island, "but seeing nothing to suit him" he took a ship to Fiji. Cotton had become a valuable commodity as a result of the disruptions of the American Civil War, and in Fiji Kirkpatrick carried on the occupation of a cotton-grower for two and a half years. By the end of that period, he had suffered severe financial loss due to hurricane damage.

=== New South Wales ===
In 1871 Kirkpatrick travelled to New South Wales and made his way to the recently established Gulgong goldfields, where he established a tailoring business in Bayly Street in the flourishing township.

As the population of the Gulgong diggings began to wane, Kirkpatrick settled at Coonabarabran and established a business as the proprietor of a produce store. In November 1877, Kirkpatrick was elected as a committee member of the local Mechanics' Institute.

In 1878 Kirkpatrick sold his store and moved to Gunnedah, where he remained a resident for the rest of his life.

=== Gunnedah ===
From about the late 1870s, Kirkpatrick began a de facto relationship with Bridget Annie Strong. Five children were born to the couple from 1880 to 1879 (one daughter and four sons). After living together and raising five children for at least ten years, John Kirkpatrick and Bridget Strong were married in 1890 at Gunnedah. Four more children were born to the couple from 1891 to 1896 (two sons and two daughters).^{[B]}

In early December 1885, Kirkpatrick was one of nine aldermen elected in the newly constituted municipal district of Gunnedah.

Kirkpatrick supported the rights of the working man in his public statements and in the press. He was one of the promoters of the establishment of a co-operative butchery in Gunnedah which commenced in about August 1889, an enterprise that was "a great success" and ended a monopoly "which had existed for a long time". He was a director of the managing company for the butchery and served as chairman from its inception to mid-1891.

At Gunnedah, Kirkpatrick was energetic in public matters and was politically active, being a supporter of Edwin Woodward Turner, the member for the Gunnedah electorate from September 1888 to June 1891. He served as president of the Gunnedah School of Arts and the Freetrade Association and was a committee member of the local hospital.

When the Gunnedah branch of the Labour Electoral League was established, Kirkpatrick was elected president and was chosen to contest the colonial general election in 1891.

=== Political career ===
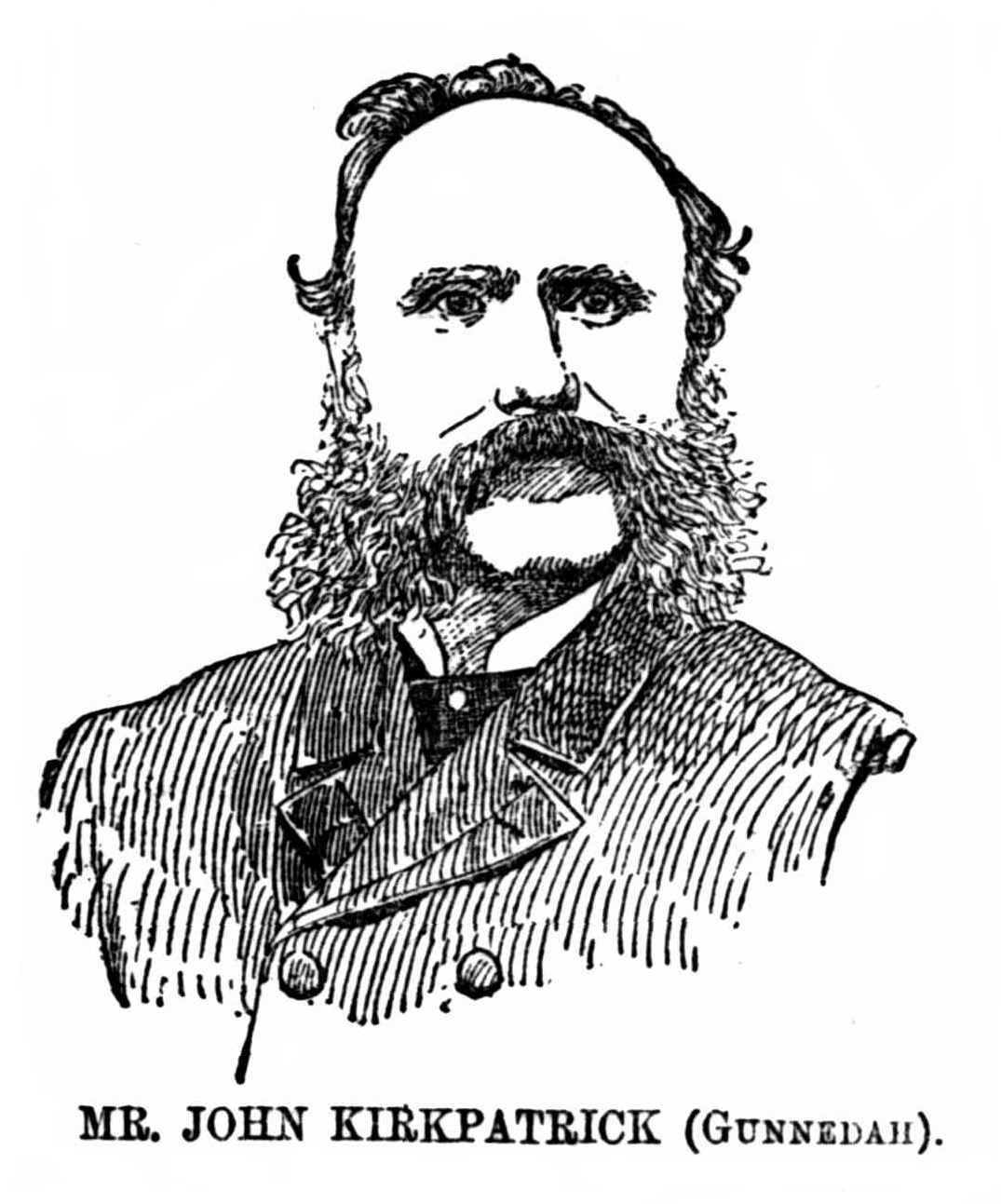
Illustration of John Kirkpatrick, published in Evening News (Sydney), 23 July 1891.

The 1891 general election in New South Wales, held in June and early July 1891, saw the first electoral successes of the Labor Party (then known as the Labour Electoral League). John Kirkpatrick was selected as candidate representing the Labour Electoral League of New South Wales, to contest the electorate of Gunnedah in the New South Wales Legislative Assembly. Three other candidates were nominated for the seat, each of them supporters of Protectionism. At the election held on 27 June 1891, Kirkpatrick was elected by an overwhelming majority, receiving 659 votes (54.9 percent).

In September 1891, Alderman Kirkpatrick was elected mayor of Gunnedah municipality for the remainder of the year, replacing E. J. A. Haynes who had resigned from the position. In early February 1892, Kirkpatrick was re-elected as mayor of Gunnedah for the ensuing year.

At the 1894 general election, Kirkpatrick was opposed by four other candidates, one of which was Job Sheldon, representing the Protectionist Party and previously the member for The Namoi electorate (that had been abolished prior to the election being called). The other three candidates were two independent free trade supporters and one independent protectionist supporter. Kirkpatrick topped the poll, held on 17 July 1894, with 674 votes (54.8 percent).

On the eve of the 1895 general election, the Gunnedah Labour League selected Samuel Hutchin, a journalist, as the Labour candidate for the Gunnedah electorate. Kirkpatrick "did not submit himself as a candidate". However, the Gunnedah seat was won by Thomas Goodwin, representing the National Federal Party (previously known as the Protectionist Party), with 649 votes (59.1 percent). Hutchin polled second, with 422 votes (38.4 percent).

Kirkpatrick decided to nominate for the seat of Gunnedah at the 1898 general election. He was one of three candidates, including the sitting member, Thomas Goodwin. Kirkpatrick stood as a Free Trade candidate. When he nominated to contest the seat in July 1898, Kirkpatrick was recorded as a tailor living at Gunnedah. At the election held on 27 July 1898, Kirkpatrick received only 23.4 percent of the vote, and the sitting member was re-elected with a substantial majority.

At a meeting of the Australian Workers' Union at Gunnedah in May 1899, Kirkpatrick was selected as an organiser to represent Gunnedah at the Central Branch of the union.

=== Later years ===
In February 1902, the Labor Party member for the Gunnedah electorate, David Hall, elected in July 1901, was subjected to criticism that he was disloyal to Britain and held 'pro-Boer' opinions in regard to a resolution he supported at a recent Labour Conference. In a letter defending himself against these charges, Hall singled out Kirkpatrick for particular criticism. Hall claimed that Kirkpatrick had called upon the Gunnedah branch of the Political Labor League (at that time the name of the New South Wales branch of the Australian Labor Party) to renounce Hall's action. Hall described Kirkpatrick as a person who had won a seat in parliament "by the help of the workers", who "afterwards discredited the Labor cause by his conduct... and then betrayed the party by openly supporting the opposition". He concluded by stating that if Kirkpatrick "has the impudence to put his nose into a meeting of the League, I do hope he will be shown in no unmistakable way that the loyal Leaguers of Gunnedah have no room for traitors to the Labor movement".

John Kirkpatrick died on 8 December 1904 at Gunnedah, aged 64.

== Notes ==
A.Another less detailed summary of Kirkpatrick's life states that he became a miner at the earlier Otago gold rush in the Central Otago region of the South Island. The Otago gold rush began in 1861 and reached its peak in 1864. The West Coast gold rush began in 1864, attracting men from the Otago goldfields and further afield, with the population peaking in 1867. In a timeline consistent with the other details of Kirkpatrick's life in New Zealand and Fiji, it seems likely that Kirkpatrick was living on the West Coast goldfields during the period of about 1865 to 1868.

B.One possible explanation for John Kirkpatrick and Bridget Strong's marriage in 1890, after living in a de facto relationship and raising five children for at least ten years beforehand, is that Kirkpatrick may have been previously married while he was living in New Zealand. John Kirkpatrick and Rosanna (or Rose Anne) Rice were married on 30 October 1868 at Greymouth on the west coast of New Zealand's South Island. At the time of his marriage Kirkpatrick was recorded as living at the gold-mining township of Hokitika, south of Greymouth. Rosanna Rice was born on 5 September 1850 in Hobart, the daughter of John Rice and Grace (née Thomas). The FamilySearch website records that Rosanna Kirkpatrick died in 1889 in Hobart (though no record or reference is cited to support this date). However, if Rosanna Kirkpatrick did die in 1889 and if John Kirkpatrick who married Rosannah Rice in New Zealand in 1868 is the same person who married Bridget Strong in 1890 (after living together for a decade), this indicates that the marriage was delayed in order to avoid a bigamous relationship.

New South Wales Legislative Assembly
Preceded by Edwin Turner	Member for Gunnedah; 1891–1895	Succeeded by Thomas Goodwin
