= Edwin Turner (politician) =

Australian politician (1849–1913)

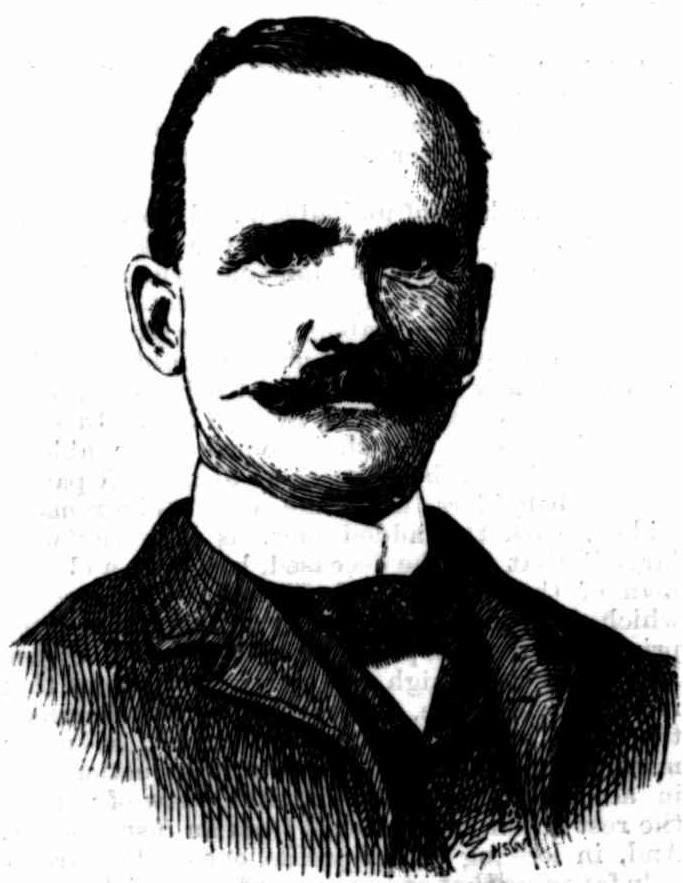
Edwin Turner

Edwin Woodward Turner (3 July 1849 – 4 September 1913) was an Australian politician.

He was born in Western Australia to farmer Thomas Turner and Elizabeth Heppingstone. He and his father moved to Victoria in 1852, and he worked as a surveyor for the Lands Department. On 30 August 1873 he married Josephine Leahy, with whom he had ten children. Around 1877 he moved to New South Wales, working once again as a public surveyor. In 1888 he was elected to the New South Wales Legislative Assembly as the Free Trade member for Gunnedah. He was re-elected in 1889 but did not contest the 1891 election. Turner died at Gunnedah in 1913.

New South Wales Legislative Assembly
Preceded by Thomas Goodwin	Member for Gunnedah; 1888–1891	Succeeded by John Kirkpatrick
