= Michael Phillips (Australian politician) =

Australian politician

Michael Thomas Phillips (c. 1851 – 22 February 1905) was an Australian politician.

He was born in Hartley to innkeeper Patrick Phillips and Sarah Walsh. He was a solicitor, working at Molong (1877–85) and Cowra (1885–1905). Around 1880 he married Elizabeth Agnes Finn at Canowindra; they had nine children. In 1896 he was elected in a by-election to the New South Wales Legislative Assembly as the Protectionist member for Cowra, but he retired at the next election in 1898. Phillips died at Cowra in 1905.

New South Wales Legislative Assembly
Preceded by Denis Donnelly	Member for Cowra; 1896–1898	Succeeded by Thomas Waddell
