= Denis Donnelly =

Australian politician (1833–1896)

Denis Cornelius Joseph Donnelly (1833 – 14 March 1896) was an Irish-born Australian politician.

Born at Cork to Cornelius Donnelly and Mary O'Leary, he worked as a miner and a merchant before arriving in Western Australia in 1850. In 1854 he followed the gold rush to Ballarat, and in 1862 moved to Forbes. Although he established a mine at Lucknow, he soon sold it and instead became a flour miller at Peel near Bathurst. On 16 January 1866 he married Ellen Agatha Cummins, with whom he had thirteen children. From around 1878 he kept a store at Cowra.

He was elected to the New South Wales Legislative Assembly as the Protectionist member for Carcoar at the 1891 election. When Carcoar was abolished in 1894, he switched to Cowra, winning the seat in 1894, and holding it at the 1895 election,

Donnelly died in Sydney in 1896 (aged 62–63).

New South Wales Legislative Assembly
Preceded by Charles Garland; John Plumb	Member for Carcoar; 1891–1894; Served alongside: Charles Jeanneret	Abolished replaced by Cowra and West Macquarie
New district	Member for Cowra; 1894–1896	Succeeded by Michael Phillips
