= William Wood (Australian politician) =

Australian politician

The Honourable William Wood
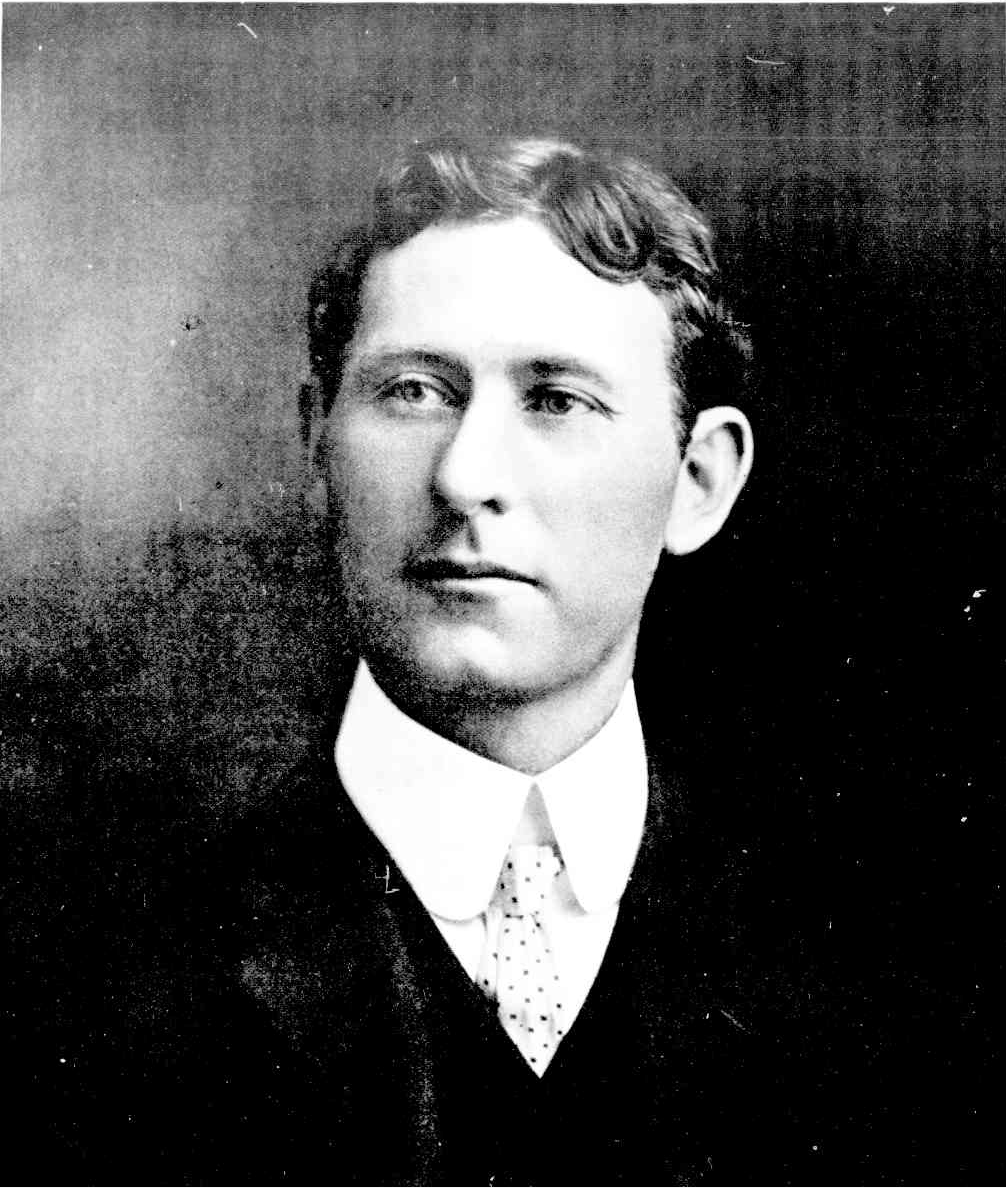

Member of the New South Wales Parliament for Eden-Bombala
- In office 27 July 1894 – 16 July 1904
- Preceded by: New district
- Succeeded by: District abolished

Member of the New South Wales Parliament for Bega
- In office 6 August 1904 – 6 November 1913
- Preceded by: Henry Clarke
- Succeeded by: William Millard

Personal details
- Born: 4 November 1869 Walhollow, Victoria
- Died: 30 May 1953 (aged 83) Rydalmere, New South Wales
- Party: Protectionist (1895–1901); Independent (1901–1904); Liberal (1904–1913)
- Education: University of Sydney

William Herbert Wood (4 November 1869 – 30 May 1953) was an Australian politician.

Born at Wallhollow, Victoria, to storekeeper Henry Gibson Wood, he attended schools in Victoria and Sydney before completing his secondary education at Sydney Grammar School and studying law at the University of Sydney. He entered his father's business and became an accountant. In 1894 he was elected to the New South Wales Legislative Assembly as the member for Eden-Bombala; he was a Protectionist from 1895 to 1901, an Independent from 1901 to 1904 and a Liberal thereafter. He was a captain in the 1st Australian Light Horse Regiment in 1900. Eden-Bombala was abolished in 1904 and split between Monaro and Bega and Wood chose to contest Bega, which he represented until 1913. Wood served as Minister of Justice in the Lyne ministry from 1899 to 1901 and Colonial Secretary in the Wade ministry from 1907 to 1910, concurrently holding the portfolios of Minister for Labour and Industry from 1907 to 1908 and Secretary for Mines from 1908 to 1910.

On 18 March 1909 he married Lillian Young née French at St James' Church, Sydney, and they divorced in 1924.

Wood died at Rydalmere in 1953 (aged 83).

Parliament of New South Wales
Political offices
Preceded by John Hughes	Minister of Justice; 1899 – 1901	Succeeded by Robert Fitzgerald
Preceded by Thomas Waddell	Colonial Secretary; 1907 – 1910	Succeeded by Donald Macdonell
Preceded by James Hogue	Minister for Labour and Industry; 1907 – 1908	Succeeded by James Hogue
Preceded by John Perry	Secretary for Mines; 1908 – 1910	Succeeded by Alfred Edden
New South Wales Legislative Assembly
New district	Member for Eden-Bombala; 1894 – 1904	District abolished
Preceded by Henry Clarke	Member for Bega; 1904 – 1913	Succeeded by William Millard
