= Arthur Nelson (Australian politician) =

Australian politician

Arthur David Nelson (1845 – 1 January 1913) was an Australian politician.

He was born in Camden to engineer William Alexander Nelson and Catherine Webster. Educated at Christ Church School, he worked as an engineer for many years, eventually establishing his own works and becoming president of the Engineering Association. In 1875, he married Phoebe Peacock, with whom he had seven children. He was elected to the New South Wales Legislative Assembly in 1895 as the Protectionist member for Sydney-Flinders; he held the seat until its abolition in 1904, at which time he was defeated running for Surry Hills. Nelson died at Stanmore in 1913.

New South Wales Legislative Assembly
Preceded by Bernhard Wise	Member for Sydney-Flinders; 1895–1904	Abolished
