= Electoral district of Sydney-Flinders =

Former state electoral district of New South Wales, Australia

Sydney-Flinders was an electoral district of the Legislative Assembly in the Australian state of New South Wales, created in 1894 in inner Sydney from part of the electoral district of South Sydney and named after maritime explorer Matthew Flinders. It was in the Surry Hills area, bounded by Riley Street, Oxford Street, South Dowling Street, Nobbs Street, Davies Street and Tudor Street. It was abolished in 1904 and absorbed into the electoral district of Surry Hills.

== Members for Sydney-Flinders ==
Member	Party	Term
Bernhard Wise	Free Trade	1894–1895
Arthur Nelson	Protectionist	1895–1901
Arthur Nelson	Progressive	1901–1904

== Election results ==
1901 New South Wales state election: Sydney-Flinders
Party	Candidate	Votes	%	±%
Progressive	Arthur Nelson	601	34.9	−13.2
Liberal Reform	John Waine	598	34.8	−3.2
Ind. Progressive	Ernest Gardner	191	11.1	+2.1
Independent Liberal	Hezekiah Evers	124	7.2	
Ind. Progressive	James Lawrence	124	7.2	
Labour	Frederick Sommerhoff	82	4.8	-0.0
Total formal votes		1,720	99.2	+0.2
Informal votes		14	0.8	−0.2
Turnout		1,734	75.8	+23.4
Progressive hold				
