= Electoral district of Eden-Bombala =

Former state electoral district of New South Wales, Australia

Eden-Bombala was an electoral district of the Legislative Assembly in the Australian state of New South Wales from 1894 to 1904, including the town of Eden. In 1894, single-member electorates were introduced statewide and the seat of Eden was split into Eden-Bombala (including Bombala) and Bega. In 1904 Eden-Bombala was abolished as a result of the 1903 New South Wales referendum which reduced the number of members of the Legislative Assembly from 125 to 90 and the district was absorbed into Monaro and Bega. Its sole member was William Wood.

== Members for Eden-Bombala ==
Member	Party	Term
William Wood	Independent Labor	1894–1895
William Wood	Protectionist	1895–1901
William Wood	Independent	1901–1904

== Election results ==
1901 New South Wales state election: Eden-Bombala
Party	Candidate	Votes	%	±%
Independent	William Wood	868	60.9	+4.0
Independent Liberal	Bernard McTernan	558	39.1	
Total formal votes		1,426	99.4	+1.4
Informal votes		8	0.6	−1.4
Turnout		1,434	62.8	−4.8
Member changed to Independent from Progressive				
