= Electoral district of Rylstone =

Former state electoral district of New South Wales, Australia

Rylstone was an electoral district of the Legislative Assembly in the Australian state of New South Wales, named after and including the town of Rylstone. The district was created when multi-member constituencies were abolished in 1894, and comprised the eastern part of Mudgee and the western part of The Upper Hunter. The district was abolished in 1904 as a result of the 1903 New South Wales referendum, which reduced the number of members of the Legislative Assembly from 125 to 90, and was divided between Hartley, Singleton and the Upper Hunter.

== Members for Rylstone ==
Member	Party	Period
William Wall	Protectionist	1894–1895
John Fitzpatrick	Free Trade	1895–1901
John Fitzpatrick	Liberal Reform	1901–1904

== Election results ==
1901 New South Wales state election: Rylstone
Party	Candidate	Votes	%	±%
Liberal Reform	John Fitzpatrick	932	62.5	+8.3
Progressive	Thomas Arkins	559	37.5	−8.3
Total formal votes		1,491	100.0	+0.7
Informal votes		0	0.0	−0.7
Turnout		1,491	60.1	−4.9
Liberal Reform hold				
