= Electoral district of Cowra =

State electoral district of New South Wales, Australia

Cowra was an electoral district of the Legislative Assembly in the Australian state of New South Wales from 1894 to 1904, including the town of Cowra.

== History ==
Prior to 1894 the town of Cowra was part of the district of Carcoar which returned two members. Multi-member constituencies were abolished in the 1893 redistribution, resulting in the creation of 76 new districts, including Cowra. Carcoar was abolished and the eastern part was given to West Macquarie and the western part to the new district of Cowra, along with the south-western part of Orange. The electoral district included parts of the counties of Bathurst and Forbes. At its establishment in 1894 Cowra had 1,903 enrolled voters, slightly less than the average of 2,046.

Cowra was abolished in 1904 when the number of members of the Legislative Assembly was reduced from 125 to 90 as a result of the 1903 New South Wales referendum. and was partly replaced by Belubula.

== Members for Cowra ==
Member	Party	Period
Denis Donnelly	Protectionist	1894–1896
Michael Phillips	Protectionist	1896–1898
Thomas Waddell	National Federal	1898–1901
Thomas Waddell	Progressive	1901–1904

== Election results ==
1901 New South Wales state election: Cowra
Party	Candidate	Votes	%	±%
Progressive	Thomas Waddell	unopposed		
Progressive hold				
