= Electoral district of Gunnedah =

Former state electoral district of New South Wales, Australia

Gunnedah was an electoral district of the Legislative Assembly in the Australian state of New South Wales, created in 1880, partly replacing Liverpool Plains, and named after and including Gunnedah. In 1904 it was abolished and replaced by Liverpool Plains and Namoi.

== Members for Gunnedah ==
Member	Party	Period
Joseph Abbott	None	1880–1887
Thomas Goodwin	Protectionist	1887–1888
Edwin Turner	Free Trade	1888–1891
John Kirkpatrick	Labour	1891–1895
Thomas Goodwin	Protectionist	1895–1901
David Hall	Labour	1901–1904

== Election results ==
1901 New South Wales state election: Gunnedah
Party	Candidate	Votes	%	±%
Labour	David Hall	1,008		+61.2
Liberal Reform	Thomas Wills-Allen	639	38.8	+13.5
Total formal votes		1,647	99.3	+0.6
Informal votes		11	0.7	−0.6
Turnout		1,658	60.4	11.4
Labour gain from Progressive				

The sitting member Thomas Goodwin (Progressive) did not contest the election.
