= Thomas Goodwin (Australian politician) =

Australian politician

Thomas Henry Hall Goodwin (11 December 1848 – 1 July 1921) was an Australian politician.

He was born at Scone to medical practitioner John Goodwin and Elizabeth Russell. He worked as a pastoralist and surveyor, and was involved in the discovery and settlement of Broken Hill. In 1887 he was elected to the New South Wales Legislative Assembly as the Protectionist member for Gunnedah, but he resigned in 1888. He returned to the Assembly in 1895, winning re-election in 1898 before retiring for good in 1901. He died in Sydney in 1921.

New South Wales Legislative Assembly
Preceded by Joseph Abbott	Member for Gunnedah; 1887–1888	Succeeded by Edwin Turner
Preceded by John Kirkpatrick	Member for Gunnedah; 1895–1901	Succeeded by David Hall
