= Electoral results for the district of Sydney-Lang =

Election results for Sydney-Lang, New South Wales, Australia

Sydney-Lang, an electoral district of the Legislative Assembly in the Australian state of New South Wales, was created in 1894 and abolished in 1904.

Election	Member	Party
1894	Billy Hughes	Labour
1895	Billy Hughes	Labour
1898	Billy Hughes	Labour
1901	John Power	Labour

== Election results ==
=== Elections in the 1900s ===
==== 1901 ====
1901 New South Wales state election: Sydney-Lang
Party	Candidate	Votes	%	±%
Labour	John Power	576	43.8	−9.8
Liberal Reform	Evan Jones	447	34.0	
Progressive	Joseph Chuck	259	19.7	−9.6
Socialist Labor	Harry Holland	34	2.6	
Total formal votes		1,316	98.8	−0.0
Informal votes		16	1.2	+0.0
Turnout		1,332	56.0	+8.5
Labour hold				

The sitting member was Billy Hughes (Labour) who did not contest the election as he had been elected in March 1901 to the federal seat of West Sydney.

=== Elections in the 1890s ===
==== 1898 ====
1898 New South Wales colonial election: Sydney-Lang
Party	Candidate	Votes	%	±%
Labour	Billy Hughes	544	53.6	
National Federal	Joseph Chuck	297	29.3	
Independent	John Strachan	164	16.2	
Independent Federalist	David Fealy	10	1.0	
Total formal votes		1,015	98.8	
Informal votes		12	1.2	
Turnout		1,027	47.5	
Labour hold				

==== 1895 ====
1895 New South Wales colonial election: Sydney-Lang
Party	Candidate	Votes	%	±%
Labour	Billy Hughes	525	58.7	
Ind. Free Trade	John Taylor	283	31.6	
Ind. Protectionist	Henry Foran	45	5.0	
Ind. Free Trade	John Anderson	42	4.7	
Total formal votes		895	98.6	
Informal votes		13	1.4	
Turnout		908	55.9	
Labour hold				

==== 1894 ====
1894 New South Wales colonial election: Sydney-Lang
Party	Candidate	Votes	%	±%
Labour	Billy Hughes	533	42.3	
Free Trade	John Taylor	428	33.9	
Protectionist	Jack FitzGerald	273	21.7	
Ind. Free Trade	John Butler	27	2.1	
Total formal votes		1,261	97.2	
Informal votes		37	2.9	
Turnout		1,298	74.8	
Labour win		(new seat)		
