= Electoral history of Billy Hughes =

List of elections featuring Billy Hughes as a candidate

The electoral history of Billy Hughes (1862–1952), the seventh prime minister of Australia, spanned 58 years across the New South Wales Legislative Assembly and House of Representatives.

In the Australian Parliament, Hughes represented the divisions of West Sydney, Bendigo, North Sydney and Bradfield, beginning in 1901 until his death in 1952. He also served as member for Sydney-Lang in the Parliament of New South Wales from 1894 until 1901.

Hughes also participated in several leadership elections in the Australian Labor Party and United Australia Party.

== New South Wales Legislative Assembly ==
=== Sydney-Lang ===
==== 1894 ====
1894 New South Wales colonial election: Sydney-Lang
Party	Candidate	Votes	%	±%
Labour	Billy Hughes	533	42.3	
Free Trade	John Taylor	428	33.9	
Protectionist	Jack FitzGerald	273	21.7	
Ind. Free Trade	John Butler	27	2.1	
Total formal votes		1,261	97.2	
Informal votes		37	2.9	
Turnout		1,298	74.8	
Labour win		(new seat)		

==== 1895 ====
1895 New South Wales colonial election: Sydney-Lang
Party	Candidate	Votes	%	±%
Labour	Billy Hughes	525	58.7	
Ind. Free Trade	John Taylor	283	31.6	
Ind. Protectionist	Henry Foran	45	5.0	
Ind. Free Trade	John Anderson	42	4.7	
Total formal votes		895	98.6	
Informal votes		13	1.4	
Turnout		908	55.9	
Labour hold				

==== 1898 ====
1898 New South Wales colonial election: Sydney-Lang
Party	Candidate	Votes	%	±%
Labour	Billy Hughes	544	53.6	
National Federal	Joseph Chuck	297	29.3	
Independent	John Strachan	164	16.2	
Independent Federalist	David Fealy	10	1.0	
Total formal votes		1,015	98.8	
Informal votes		12	1.2	
Turnout		1,027	47.5	
Labour hold				

== House of Representatives ==
=== West Sydney ===
==== 1901 ====
1901 Australian federal election: West Sydney
Party	Candidate	Votes	%	±%
Labour	Billy Hughes	6,652	73.7	+73.7
Protectionist	James Beer	2,062	22.9	+22.9
Ind. Protectionist	James Hanrahan	307	3.4	+3.4
Total formal votes		9,021	97.0	
Informal votes		279	3.0	
Turnout		9,300	63.4	
Labour win		(new seat)		

==== 1903 ====
1903 Australian federal election: West Sydney
Party	Candidate	Votes	%	±%
Labour	Billy Hughes	7,272	69.9	−3.7
Free Trade	Edward Warren	3,129	30.1	+30.1
Total formal votes		10,403	96.2	
Informal votes		406	3.8	
Turnout		10,809	41.9	
Labour hold		Swing	−5.5	

==== 1906 ====
1906 Australian federal election: West Sydney
Party	Candidate	Votes	%	±%
Labour	Billy Hughes	7,561	55.5	−14.4
Anti-Socialist	James Burns	6,056	44.5	+14.4
Total formal votes		13,617	96.7	
Informal votes		469	3.3	
Turnout		14,086	50.1	
Labour hold		Swing	−14.4	

==== 1910 ====
1910 Australian federal election: West Sydney
Party	Candidate	Votes	%	±%
Labour	Billy Hughes	13,000	69.8	+14.3
Liberal	Stanley Cole	4,986	26.8	−17.7
Socialist Labor	Harry Holland	628	3.4	+3.4
Total formal votes		18,614	98.2	
Informal votes		341	1.8	
Turnout		18,955	60.7	
Labour hold		Swing	+16.0	

==== 1913 ====
1913 Australian federal election: West Sydney
Party	Candidate	Votes	%	±%
Labor	Billy Hughes	17,658	71.3	-0.0
Liberal	John Sutton	7,119	28.7	+2.9
Total formal votes		24,777	94.6	
Informal votes		1,406	5.4	
Turnout		26,183	64.6	
Labor hold		Swing	−1.5	

==== 1914 ====
1914 Australian federal election: West Sydney
Party	Candidate	Votes	%	±%
Labor	Billy Hughes	15,774	75.3	+4.0
Liberal	Walter Finch	5,187	24.7	−4.0
Total formal votes		20,961	96.6	
Informal votes		731	3.4	
Turnout		21,692	54.8	
Labor hold		Swing	+4.0	

=== Bendigo ===
==== 1917 ====
1917 Australian federal election: Bendigo
Party	Candidate	Votes	%	±%
Nationalist	Billy Hughes	16,272	57.4	+12.5
Labor	Alfred Hampson	12,091	42.6	−12.5
Total formal votes		28,363	97.9	
Informal votes		618	2.1	
Turnout		28,981	89.7	
Nationalist gain from Labor		Swing	+12.5	

==== 1919 ====
1919 Australian federal election: Bendigo
Party	Candidate	Votes	%	±%
Nationalist	Billy Hughes	14,291	55.0	−2.4
Labor	Alfred Hampson	11,676	45.0	+2.4
Total formal votes		25,967	99.3	
Informal votes		186	0.7	
Turnout		26,153	82.8	
Nationalist hold		Swing	−2.4	

=== North Sydney ===
==== 1922 ====
1922 Australian federal election: North Sydney
Party	Candidate	Votes	%	±%
Nationalist	Billy Hughes	16,475	58.2	−11.2
Constitutionalist	Albert Piddington	11,812	41.8	+41.8
Total formal votes		28,287	97.3	
Informal votes		775	2.7	
Turnout		29,062	65.5	
Nationalist hold		Swing	−11.2	

==== 1925 ====
1925 Australian federal election: North Sydney
Party	Candidate	Votes	%	±%
Nationalist	Billy Hughes	33,855	71.5	+13.3
Labor	Joe Lamaro	13,500	28.5	+28.5
Total formal votes		47,355	98.8	
Informal votes		581	1.2	
Turnout		47,936	92.9	
Nationalist hold		Swing	+13.3	

==== 1928 ====
1928 Australian federal election: North Sydney
Party	Candidate	Votes	%	±%
Nationalist	Billy Hughes	32,734	66.2	−5.3
Labor	Ben Howe	16,736	33.8	+5.3
Total formal votes		49,470	94.8	
Informal votes		2,718	5.2	
Turnout		52,188	94.6	
Nationalist hold		Swing	−5.3	

==== 1929 ====
1929 Australian federal election: North Sydney
Party	Candidate	Votes	%	±%
Ind. Nationalist	Billy Hughes	33,263	61.2	+61.2
Nationalist	Lewis Nott	20,298	37.3	−28.9
Independent Labor	Clifford Banks	618	1.1	+1.1
Socialist Labor	Ernie Judd	180	0.3	+0.3
Total formal votes		54,359	97.9	
Informal votes		1,169	2.1	
Turnout		55,528	95.7	
Two-party-preferred result
Ind. Nationalist	Billy Hughes		66.1	+66.1
Nationalist	Lewis Nott		33.9	−32.3
Ind. Nationalist gain from Nationalist		Swing	+32.3	

==== 1931 ====
1931 Australian federal election: North Sydney
Party	Candidate	Votes	%	±%
United Australia	Billy Hughes	22,317	40.8	+1.3
United Australia	Norman Cowper	19,724	36.0	+36.0
Labor (NSW)	Norman Nelson	12,696	23.2	+23.2
Total formal votes		54,737	98.3	
Informal votes		920	1.7	
Turnout		55,657	94.2	
Two-party-preferred result
United Australia	Billy Hughes		57.5	+23.6
United Australia	Norman Cowper		42.5	+42.5
United Australia gain from Independent		Swing	+23.6	

==== 1934 ====
1934 Australian federal election: North Sydney
Party	Candidate	Votes	%	±%
United Australia	Billy Hughes	35,532	65.1	−12.2
Labor (NSW)	Stan Taylor	12,684	23.2	+0.6
Social Credit	Vincent Kelly	6,385	11.7	+11.7
Total formal votes		54,601	98.0	
Informal votes		1,112	2.0	
Turnout		55,713	96.0	
Two-party-preferred result
United Australia	Billy Hughes		71.0	+13.5
Labor (NSW)	Stan Taylor		29.0	+29.0
United Australia hold		Swing	+13.5	

==== 1937 ====
1937 Australian federal election: North Sydney
Party	Candidate	Votes	%	±%
United Australia	Billy Hughes	38,386	65.9	+0.8
Labor	Henry Clayden	16,254	27.9	+27.9
Social Credit	Percival Minahan	3,568	6.1	−5.6
Total formal votes		58,208	97.7	
Informal votes		1,344	2.3	
Turnout		59,552	97.2	
Two-party-preferred result
United Australia	Billy Hughes		69.0	−2.0
Labor	Henry Clayden		31.0	+31.0
United Australia hold		Swing	−2.0	

==== 1940 ====
1940 Australian federal election: North Sydney
Party	Candidate	Votes	%	±%
United Australia	Billy Hughes	38,381	61.3	−4.6
State Labor	William Wilson	10,965	17.5	+17.5
Labor	James Dooley	9,704	15.5	−12.4
Labor (N-C)	John Steel	3,526	5.6	+5.6
Total formal votes		62,576	98.2	
Informal votes		1,170	1.8	
Turnout		63,746	95.5	
Two-party-preferred result
United Australia	Billy Hughes		67.6	−1.4
State Labor	William Wilson		32.4	+32.4
United Australia hold		Swing	−1.4	

==== 1943 ====
1943 Australian federal election: North Sydney
Party	Candidate	Votes	%	±%
United Australia	Billy Hughes	29,962	44.1	−17.2
Labor	Leo Haylen	24,989	35.7	+20.2
Independent	Patrick Williams	6,132	9.0	+9.0
Independent	Eric Bentley	3,349	4.9	+4.9
Communist	Jack Miles	2,821	4.2	+4.2
One Parliament	Jack Lewis	938	1.4	+1.4
Independent	Oliver Partington	455	0.7	+0.7
Total formal votes		67,946	95.3	
Informal votes		3,323	4.7	
Turnout		71,269	98.4	
Two-party-preferred result
United Australia	Billy Hughes	36,066	53.1	−14.5
Labor	Leo Haylen	31,880	46.9	+46.9
United Australia hold		Swing	−14.5	

==== 1946 ====
1946 Australian federal election: North Sydney
Party	Candidate	Votes	%	±%
Liberal	Billy Hughes	40,845	55.9	+11.8
Labor	Leo Haylen	32,247	44.1	+8.4
Total formal votes		73,092	98.0	
Informal votes		1,503	2.0	
Turnout		74,595	96.1	
Liberal hold		Swing	+2.8	

=== Bradfield ===
==== 1949 ====
1949 Australian federal election: Bradfield
Party	Candidate	Votes	%	±%
Liberal	Billy Hughes	28,428	71.4	−3.8
Labor	Ken Gee	8,645	21.7	−3.0
Independent	Edward Price	2,764	6.9	+6.9
Total formal votes		39,837	98.2	
Informal votes		722	1.8	
Turnout		40,559	95.8	
Two-party-preferred result
Liberal	Billy Hughes		74.9	−0.3
Labor	Ken Gee		25.1	+0.3
Liberal notional hold		Swing	−0.3	

==== 1951 ====
1951 Australian federal election: Bradfield
Party	Candidate	Votes	%	±%
Liberal	Billy Hughes	32,469	78.7	+7.3
Labor	Hugh Milne	8,784	21.3	−0.4
Total formal votes		41,253	98.2	
Informal votes		762	1.8	
Turnout		42,015	95.8	
Liberal hold		Swing	+3.8	

== Leadership elections ==
=== United Australia Party ===
==== 1939 ====
1939 United Australia Party leadership election
Party	Candidate	Votes	%	±%
United Australia	Robert Menzies	N/A		
United Australia	Billy Hughes	N/A		
United Australia	Richard Casey	withdrew		
United Australia	Thomas White	withdrew		
Second ballot result
United Australia	Robert Menzies	22	50.00	
United Australia	Billy Hughes	22	50.00	
Turnout		44	100.0	
Final ballot result
United Australia	Robert Menzies	23	54.80	+4.80
United Australia	Billy Hughes	19	45.20	−4.80
Turnout		42	95.50	−4.50

==== 1941 ====
1941 United Australia Party leadership election
Party	Candidate	Votes	%	±%
United Australia	Billy Hughes	?		
United Australia	Allan McDonald	?		
United Australia	Percy Spender	?		
Second ballot result
United Australia	Billy Hughes	16?		
United Australia	Allan McDonald	15?		

== Sources ==
- Fitzhardinge, L. F. (1979). William Morris Hughes: A Political Biography. Vol. 2: The Little Digger, 1914–1952. Angus & Robertson. ISBN 0207132453.
- Page, Earle (1963). Truant Surgeon: The Inside Story of Forty Years of Australian Political Life. Angus & Robertson.
