= Laurie Fitzhardinge =

Australian historian and librarian

Laurence Frederic Fitzhardinge (7 July 1908 – 31 October 1993) was an Australian historian and librarian. He was known as a pioneer of the Australian Dictionary of Biography, and also as the official biographer of Billy Hughes (the eleventh Prime Minister of Australia).

== Biography ==
Fitzhardinge was born in Chatswood, New South Wales. He was educated at the Sydney Church of England Grammar School before going on to the University of Sydney, where he graduated with a B.A. in 1930. He specialised in Classics, and continued his studies at New College, Oxford, where he was awarded a B.A. (Oxon) in 1932 and a B.Litt in 1933. Returning to Australia, in 1934 Fitzhardinge began working at the Commonwealth National Library as the research officer responsible for Australian collections. He compiled two major bibliographies of Australia, and helped expand the library's manuscript collection.

From 1944 to 1945, Fitzhardinge was seconded to Canberra University College to teach Australian history to diplomatic cadets; one of his students there was Donald Horne. He was appointed a classics lecturer at the University of Sydney in 1945, and also began the research that would lead to the creation of the Sydney University Press. In 1951, Fitzhardinge returned to Canberra to work at the fledgling Australian National University (ANU), as a reader in Australian history. He began compiling an Australian biographical register in 1954, and with the support of Sir Keith Hancock began to advocate for the creation of a national dictionary of biography. The result of his lobbying was the Australian Dictionary of Biography, which published its first edition in 1966.

Fitzhardinge retired from ANU in 1973. He was elected a Fellow of the Australian Academy of the Humanities in 1983 and a Fellow of the Royal Australian Historical Society in 1987. In retirement, Fitzhardinge lived on a farm near Queanbeyan, New South Wales, which he and his wife Verity Hewitt (married 1936) had bought in 1959. He died in Queanbeyan in 1993, aged 85, of heart disease.

== Works ==
Fitzhardinge authored several chapters in Nation Building in Australia (1941), a biography of Sir Littleton Groom. In 1951, a year before he died, former prime minister Billy Hughes appointed him as his official biographer. Hughes' biography became Fitzhardinge's magnum opus, taking him almost 30 years of research to compile (amid complaints from Dame Mary Hughes). Titled William Morris Hughes: A Political Biography, it was published in two volumes: That Fiery Particle, 1862–1914 (1964) and The Little Digger, 1914–1952 (1979). Fitzhardinge's other major work was The Spartans (1980), a survey of art in ancient Sparta.
