= John Joseph Power =

Australian politician

John Joseph Power (1867 – 3 April 1968) was an Australian state politician.

He was born in Sydney to George and Nora Power, and attended St Joseph's College. He studied at the University of Sydney before working as a civil engineer and surveyor. In 1887 he became a publican. In 1901 he was elected to the New South Wales Legislative Assembly as the Labor member for Sydney-Lang. He lost preselection in 1904 and retired from politics. Power died a centenarian at Kurrajong in 1968.

New South Wales Legislative Assembly
Preceded by Billy Hughes	Member for Sydney-Lang; 1901–1904	Abolished
