= John Strachan (explorer) =

Australian explorer

John Strachan (1846 – 30 August 1922) was a Scottish-born Australian shipmaster and explorer.

Born in Montrose, Scotland, to engineer John Strachan and Sarah, née Delarne, Strachan's family moved to England in 1853 where he studied engineering before running away to sea, fighting for the Union in the American Civil War, sailing on the trade routes from India to Japan, whaling in the Arctic, advising the Prince of Higo in Japan, and managing guano workings on Baker Island. He arrived in Tasmania on 25 April 1872 as mate of the Rita, and on 3 March 1875 married Alice Sarah Henrietta Plummer at Launceston. He worked at Bird Island in the Coral Sea managing more guano workings and visited Torres Strait in September 1875.

Subsequently Strachan established himself in Sydney before becoming New Guinea correspondent for the Age, embarking on an exploratory trip down the Mai Kassa River on 6 May 1884 which led to considerable fighting with the indigenous people and the death of one of Strachan's companions; his use of an improvised torpedo provoked widespread condemnation in Sydney. He went on another expedition to the Mai Kassa and the Gulf of Papua in September but in January 1886 his claim of discovery was disallowed for 500,000 acres of the area he explored. In 1887 he appealed to the Colonial Office, which dismissed his claim as "excitable and rather ignorant". After exploring McClure's Gulf in 1887 from a base in Cape York he published Explorations and Adventures in New Guinea in 1888, which was poorly received by geographers. He based himself in Sydney again in 1889 and established trading operations in Borneo and the Dutch East Indies. He successfully sued the Launceston Daily Telegraph in 1896 for £2000 after it published a story about his early life.

Strachan ran unsuccessfully for the New South Wales Parliament against Billy Hughes in 1898 (he appears as "Captain Alistair" in Hughes' 1947 book Crusts and Crusades), but in November 1902 was imprisoned for debt in North Borneo. In 1903 he again tried to enter politics, this time running against Joseph Cook for the federal seat of Parramatta without success. He unsuccessfully sued the Commonwealth in 1906 for detention of his ship at Daru in Papua, and was charged with illegal recruiting by the Germans in New Guinea in 1909. He subsequently retired, although he was active in anti-German organisations during World War I and ran for the state seat of Parramatta in 1917, winning only 26 votes. HThe died in Sydney of chronic cystitis in 1922.

The remains of Strachan's 1884 boat in the Mai Kassa influenced local folklore, becoming referred to as Noah's Ark.
