= Electoral district of Sydney-Lang =

Former state electoral district of New South Wales, Australia

Sydney-Lang was an electoral district of the Legislative Assembly in the Australian state of New South Wales, created in 1894 from part of the electoral district of West Sydney in inner Sydney and named after Presbyterian clergyman, writer, politician and activist John Dunmore Lang. It was west of George Street, generally south of Margaret Street, north of Hay Street and east of Darling Harbour. It was abolished in 1904 and absorbed into Darling Harbour.

Future Prime Minister of Australia Billy Hughes was the member for Sydney-Lang from 1894 to 1901, when he resigned to enter the newly established Federal parliament.

== Members for Sydney-Lang ==
Member	Party	Term
Billy Hughes	Labour	1894–1901
John Power	Labour	1901–1904

== Election results ==
1901 New South Wales state election: Sydney-Lang
Party	Candidate	Votes	%	±%
Labour	John Power	576	43.8	−9.8
Liberal Reform	Evan Jones	447	34.0	
Progressive	Joseph Chuck	259	19.7	−9.6
Socialist Labor	Harry Holland	34	2.6	
Total formal votes		1,316	98.8	−0.0
Informal votes		16	1.2	+0.0
Turnout		1,332	56.0	+8.5
Labour hold				

The sitting member was Billy Hughes (Labour) who did not contest the election as he had been elected in March 1901 to the federal seat of West Sydney.
