= Billy Hughes =

Prime Minister of Australia from 1915 to 1923

The Right Honourable Billy Hughes CH QC
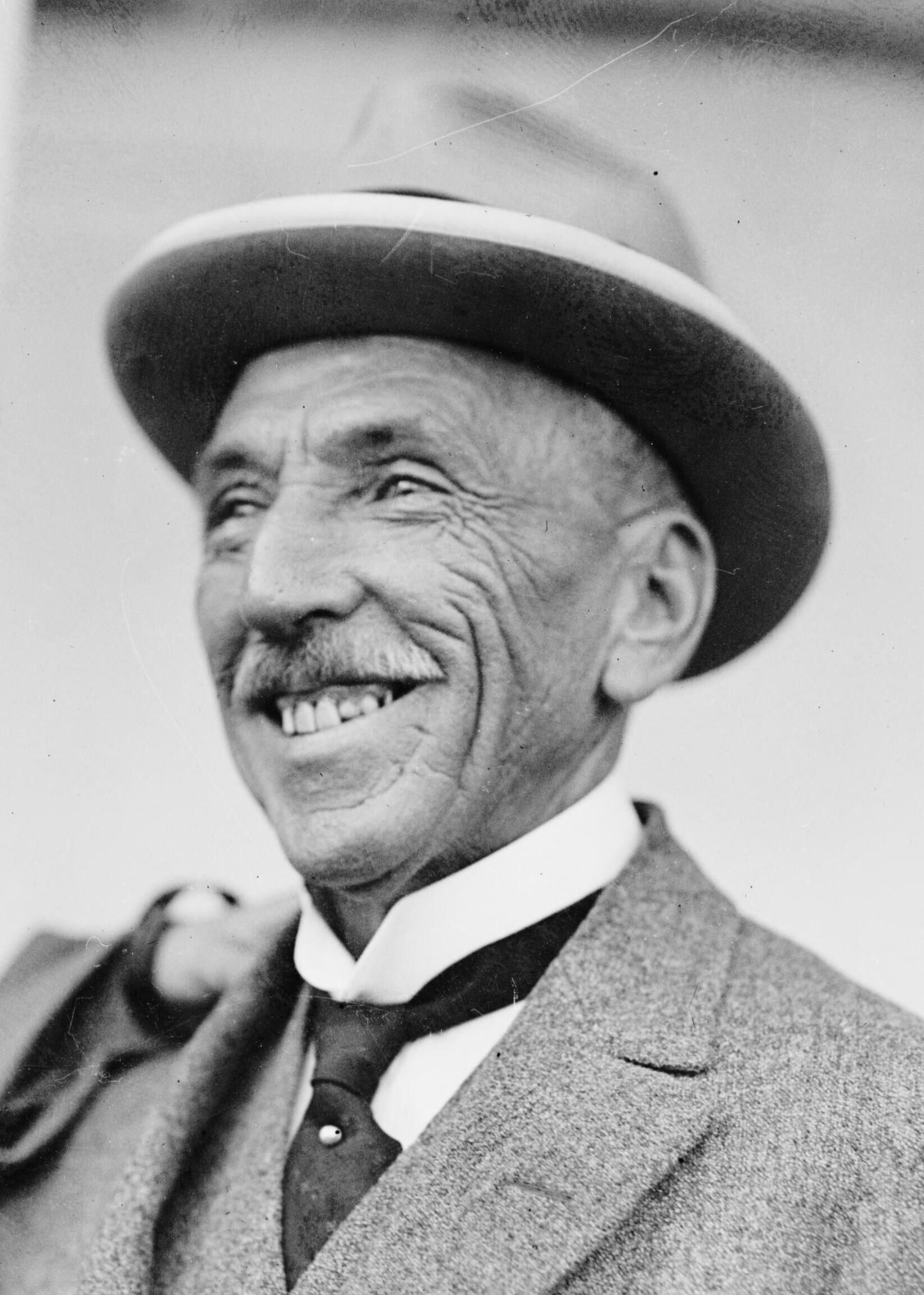
- Hughes in 1919

7th Prime Minister of Australia
- In office 27 October 1915 – 9 February 1923
- Monarch: George V
- Governors-General: Sir Ronald Munro Ferguson; Lord Forster
- Preceded by: Andrew Fisher
- Succeeded by: Stanley Bruce
Party leadership positions
Leader of the Labor Party
In office 27 October 1915 – 14 November 1916
Deputy	George Pearce
Preceded by	Andrew Fisher
Succeeded by	Frank Tudor
Leader of the National Labor Party
In office 14 November 1916 – 17 February 1917
Deputy	George Pearce
Preceded by	Position created
Succeeded by	Position abolished
Leader of the Nationalist Party Elections: 1917, 1919, 1922
In office 17 February 1917 – 9 February 1923
Deputy	Sir Joseph Cook; Stanley Bruce
Preceded by	Position created
Succeeded by	Stanley Bruce
Leader of the Australian Party
In office 2 October 1929 – 7 May 1931
Preceded by	Position created
Succeeded by	Position abolished
Leader of the United Australia Party Elections: 1943
In office 9 October 1941 – 22 September 1943
Preceded by	Robert Menzies
Succeeded by	Robert Menzies
Deputy Leader of the Labor Party
In office 18 September 1914 – 27 October 1915
Leader	Andrew Fisher
Preceded by	Gregor McGregor
Succeeded by	George Pearce
Deputy Leader of the United Australia Party
In office 22 September 1943 – 14 April 1944
Leader	Robert Menzies
Preceded by	Position created
Succeeded by	Eric Harrison
Cabinet posts
Attorney-General of Australia
In office 20 March 1939 – 7 October 1941
Prime Minister	Joseph Lyons; Earle Page; Robert Menzies; Arthur Fadden
Preceded by	Robert Menzies
Succeeded by	H. V. Evatt
In office 17 September 1914 – 21 December 1921
Prime Minister	Andrew Fisher; Himself
Preceded by	William Irvine
Succeeded by	Littleton Groom
In office 29 April 1910 – 24 June 1913
Prime Minister	Andrew Fisher
Preceded by	Paddy Glynn
Succeeded by	William Irvine
In office 13 November 1908 – 2 June 1909
Prime Minister	Andrew Fisher
Preceded by	Littleton Groom
Succeeded by	Paddy Glynn
Minister for External Affairs
In office 29 November 1937 – 26 April 1939
Prime Minister	Joseph Lyons; Earle Page
Preceded by	George Pearce
Succeeded by	Henry Gullett
In office 21 December 1921 – 9 February 1923
Prime Minister	Himself
Preceded by	Position re-created
Succeeded by	Stanley Bruce
In office 27 April 1904 – 17 August 1904
Prime Minister	Chris Watson
Preceded by	Alfred Deakin
Succeeded by	George Reid
Constituencies
Member of the Australian House of Representatives
In office 29 March 1901 – 28 October 1952
Constituency	West Sydney (1901–17); Bendigo (1917–22); North Sydney (1922–49); Bradfield (1949–52)
Member of the New South Wales Legislative Assembly
In office 17 July 1894 – 11 June 1901
Preceded by	New district
Succeeded by	John Power
Constituency	Sydney-Lang

Personal details
- Born: William Morris Hughes; 25 September 1862 Pimlico, London, England
- Died: 28 October 1952 (aged 90) Sydney, New South Wales, Australia
- Resting place: Macquarie Park Cemetery and Crematorium
- Party: Australian Socialist League (1891); Labor (to 1916); National Labor (1916–1917); Nationalist (1917–1929); Independent (1929, 1944–1945); Australian (1929–1931); United Australia (1931–1944); Liberal (from 1945)
- Height: 5 ft 6 in (1.68 m)
- Spouses: Elizabeth Cutts (died 1906) Mary Campbell (m. 1911)
- Children: 7
- Occupation: Politician; barrister; sailor

William Morris Hughes (25 September 1862 – 28 October 1952) was the seventh prime minister of Australia, serving from 1915 to 1923. He led the nation during World War I, and his influence on national politics spanned several decades. He was a member of the federal parliament from the Federation of Australia in 1901 until his death in 1952, and is the only person to have served as a parliamentarian for more than 50 years. He represented six political parties during his career, leading five, outlasting four, and being expelled from three.

Hughes was born in London to Welsh parents. He emigrated to Australia at the age of 22, and became involved in the fledgling Australian labour movement. He was elected to the New South Wales Legislative Assembly in 1894, as a member of the New South Wales Labor Party, and then transferred to the new federal parliament in 1901. Hughes combined his early political career with part-time legal studies, and was called to the bar in 1903. He first entered cabinet in 1904, in the short-lived Watson government, and was later the attorney-general of Australia in each of Andrew Fisher's governments. He was elected deputy leader of the Australian Labor Party in 1914.

Hughes became prime minister in October 1915, when Fisher retired due to ill health. The war was the dominant issue of the time, and his support for sending conscripted troops overseas caused a split within Labor ranks. Hughes and his supporters were expelled from the party in November 1916, but he was able to remain in power at the head of the new National Labor Party, which after a few months merged with the Liberals to form the Nationalist Party. His conservative governments were re-elected with large majorities at the 1917 and 1919 elections. Hughes established the forerunners of the Australian Federal Police and the CSIRO during the war, and also created a number of new state-owned enterprises to aid the post-war economy. He made a significant impression on other world leaders at the 1919 Paris Peace Conference, where he secured Australian control of the former German New Guinea.

At the 1922 Australian federal election, the Nationalists lost their majority in parliament and were forced to form a coalition with the Country Party. Hughes's resignation was the price for Country Party support, and he was succeeded as prime minister by Stanley Bruce. He became one of Bruce's leading critics over time, and in 1928, following a dispute over industrial relations, he and his supporters crossed the floor on a confidence motion and brought down the government. After a period as an independent, Hughes formed his own organisation, the Australian Party, which in 1931 merged into the new United Australia Party (UAP). He returned to cabinet in 1934, and became known for his prescient warnings against Japanese imperialism. As late as 1939, he missed out on a second stint as prime minister by only a handful of votes, losing the 1939 United Australia Party leadership election to Robert Menzies.

Hughes is generally acknowledged as one of the most influential Australian politicians of the 20th century. He was a controversial figure throughout his lifetime, and his legacy continues to be debated by historians. His strong views and abrasive manner meant he frequently made political enemies, often from within his own parties. Hughes's opponents accused him of engaging in authoritarianism and populism, as well as inflaming sectarianism; his use of the War Precautions Act 1914 was particularly controversial. His former colleagues in the Labor Party considered him a traitor, while conservatives were suspicious of what they viewed as his socialist economic policies. He was extremely popular among the general public, particularly ex-servicemen, who affectionately nicknamed him "the little digger".

== Early years ==
=== Birth and family background ===
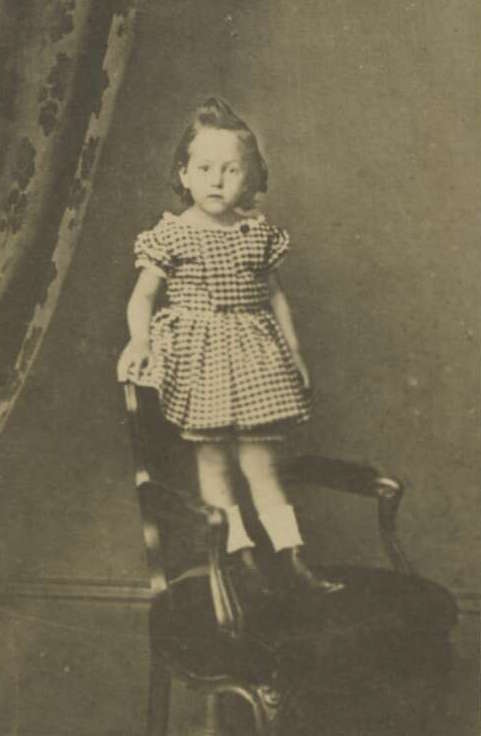
An unbreeched Hughes at about the age of four

Hughes was born on 25 September 1862, at 7 Moreton Place, Pimlico, London, to William Hughes and Jane Morris. His parents were both Welsh. His father, who worked as a carpenter and joiner at the Palace of Westminster, was from North Wales (Note: He was either from Holyhead, Anglesey, or from the Vale of Clwyd in Denbighshire.) and was a fluent Welsh speaker. His mother, a domestic servant, was from the small village of Llansantffraid-ym-Mechain (near the English border), and spoke only English. Hughes was an only child, and at the time of their June 1861 marriage, his parents were both 37 years old.

=== Wales ===
Hughes's mother died in May 1869, when he was six years old. His father subsequently sent him to be raised by relatives in Wales. During the school term, he lived with his father's sister, Mary Hughes, who kept a boarding house in Llandudno named "Bryn Rosa". He earned pocket money by doing chores for his aunt's tenants and singing in the choir at the local church. Hughes began his formal education in Llandudno, attending two small single-teacher schools. He spent his holidays with his mother's family in Llansantffraid. There, he divided his time between "Winllan", the farm of his widowed aunt (Margaret Mason), and "Plas Bedw", the neighbouring farm of his grandparents (Peter and Jane Morris).

Hughes regarded his early years in Wales as the happiest time of his life. He was immensely proud of his Welsh identity, and he later became active in the Welsh Australian community, frequently speaking at Saint David's Day celebrations. Hughes called Welsh the "language of heaven", but his own grasp of it was patchy. Like many of his contemporaries, he had no formal schooling in Welsh, and had particular difficulties with spelling. Nonetheless, he received and replied to correspondence from Welsh-speakers throughout his political career, and as prime minister famously traded insults in Welsh with David Lloyd George.

=== London ===
At the age of eleven, Hughes was enrolled in St Stephen's School, Westminster, one of the many church schools established by the philanthropist Angela Burdett-Coutts, 1st Baroness Burdett-Coutts. He won prizes in geometry and French, receiving the latter from Lord Harrowby. After finishing his elementary schooling, he was apprenticed as a "pupil-teacher" for five years, instructing younger students for five hours a day in exchange for personal lessons from the headmaster and a small stipend. At St Stephen's, Hughes came into contact with the poet Matthew Arnold, who was an examiner and inspector for the local school district. Arnold – who coincidentally had holidayed at Llandudno – took a liking to Hughes, and gifted him a copy of the Complete Works of Shakespeare; Hughes credited Arnold with instilling his lifelong love of literature.

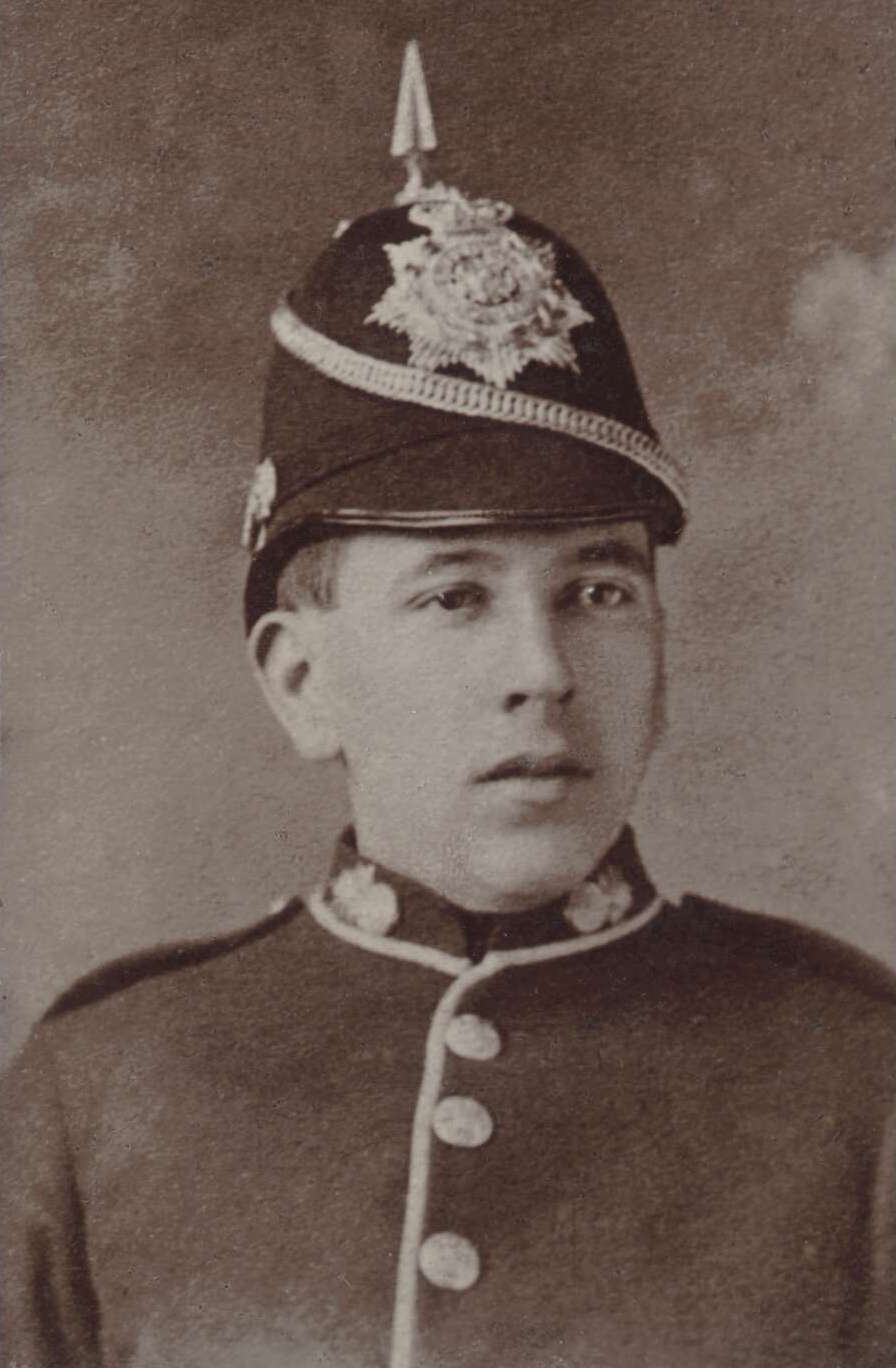
Hughes in his Royal Fusiliers uniform, c. 1880

After finishing his initial apprenticeship, Hughes stayed on at St Stephen's as a teaching assistant. He had no interest in teaching as a career though, and also declined Matthew Arnold's offer to secure him a clerkship at Coutts. His relative financial security allowed him to pursue his own interests for the first time, which included bellringing, boating on the Thames, and travel (such as a two-day trip to Paris). He also joined a volunteer battalion of the Royal Fusiliers, which consisted mainly of artisans and white-collar workers. In later life, Hughes recalled London as "a place of romance, mystery and suggestion".

== First years in Australia ==
=== Queensland ===
At the age of 22, finding his prospects in London dim, Hughes decided to emigrate to Australia. Taking advantage of an assisted-passage scheme offered by the Colony of Queensland, he arrived in Brisbane on 8 December 1884 after a two-month journey. On arrival, he gave his year of birth as 1864, a deception that was not uncovered until after his death. Hughes attempted to find work with the Education Department, but was either not offered a position or found the terms of employment to be unsuitable. He spent the next two years as an itinerant labourer, working various odd jobs. In his memoirs, Hughes claimed to have worked variously as a fruitpicker, tally clerk, navvy, blacksmith's striker, station hand, drover, and saddler's assistant, and to have travelled (mostly on foot) as far north as Rockhampton, as far west as Adavale, and as far south as Orange, New South Wales. He also claimed to have served briefly in both the Queensland Defence Force and the Queensland Maritime Defence Force. Hughes's accounts are by their nature unverifiable, and his biographers have cast doubt on their veracity – Fitzhardinge states that they were embellished at best and at worst "a world of pure fantasy".

=== New South Wales ===
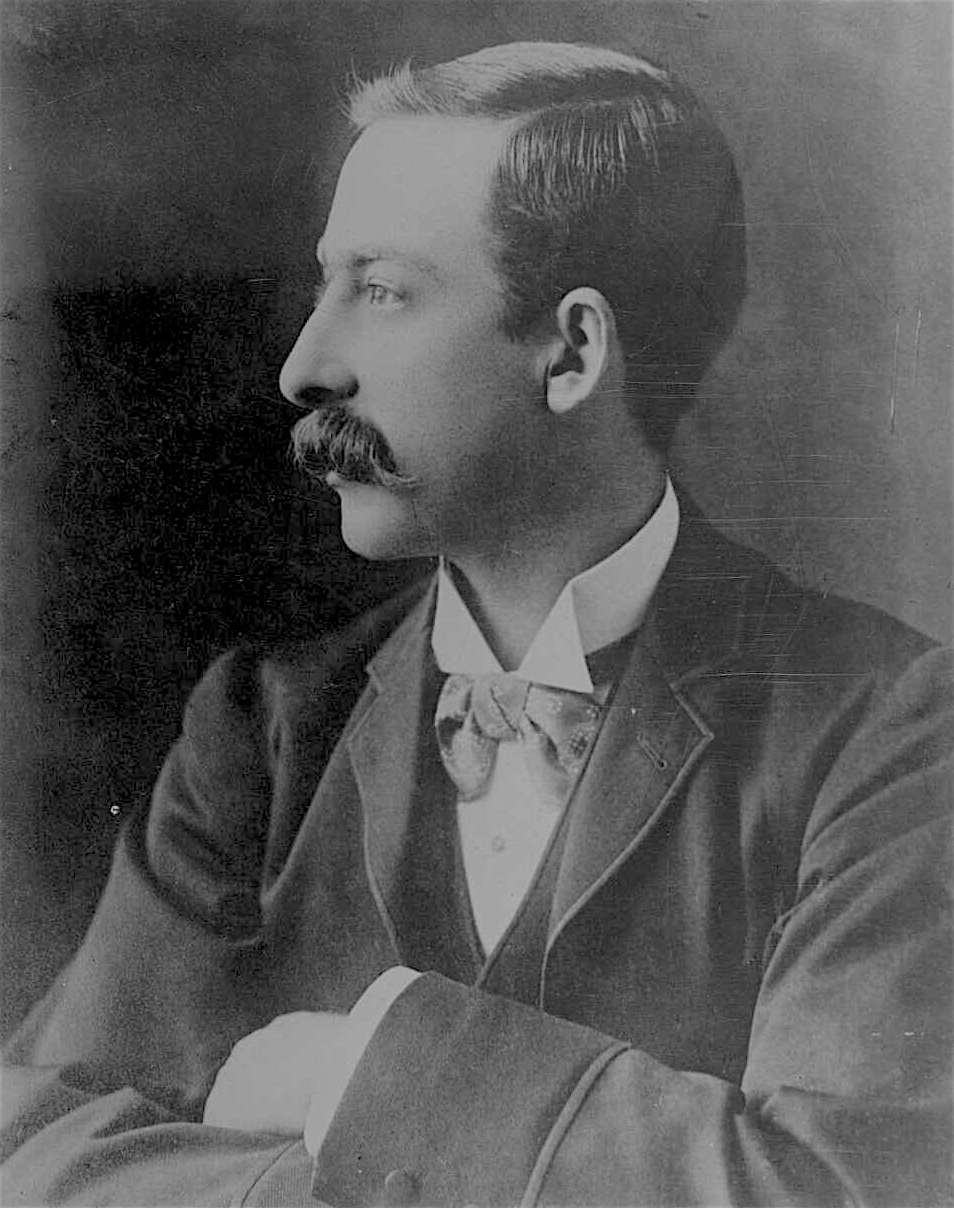
Hughes in 1895 (age 33)

Hughes moved to Sydney in about mid-1886, working his way there as a deckhand and galley cook aboard SS Maranoa. He found occasional work as a line cook, but at one point supposedly had to resort to living in a cave on The Domain for a few days. Hughes eventually found a steady job at a forge, making hinges for colonial ovens. Around the same time, he entered into a common-law marriage with Elizabeth Cutts, his landlady's daughter; they had six children together. In 1890, Hughes moved to Balmain. The following year, with his wife's financial assistance, he was able to open a small shop selling general merchandise. The income from the shop was not enough to live on, so he also worked part-time as a locksmith and umbrella salesman, and his wife as a washerwoman. One of Hughes's acquaintances in Balmain was William Wilks, another future MP, while one of the customers at his shop was Frederick Jordan, a future chief justice of New South Wales.

== Colonial politics ==
In Balmain, Hughes became a Georgist, a street-corner speaker, president of the Balmain Single Tax League, and joined the Australian Socialist League. He was an organiser with the Australian Workers' Union and may have already joined the newly formed Labor Party.

In late 1893, Hughes was appointed as a paid organiser for the Labor Electoral League of New South Wales, spending eight months in remote Central West electorates organising shearers and other rural workers. Back in Sydney his statute in the party rose through his support of party leader Chris Watson's dominant moderate faction at the annual conference. He was also involved with the creation of a short-lived weekly radical newspaper, the New Order. Hughes was elected to the New South Wales Legislative Assembly at the 1894 general election, winning the seat of Sydney-Lang from ex-Labor MP John FitzGerald amid an overall trend against endorsed Labor candidates. He was re-elected to Sydney-Lang at the 1895 and 1898 elections, holding the seat until his transfer to the new federal parliament.

Hughes supported the principle of federating the British colonies in Australia and was an unsuccessful candidate for the 1897 Australasian Federal Convention election. As with many Labor MPs he objected to the draft constitution passed by the convention, regarding the model used for the Senate as undemocratic.

== Labour movement ==
Unlike many of his contemporaries, Hughes had not worked as a tradesman or skilled labourer prior to his entry into politics. He instead became involved in the trade union movement as a means of developing a political base to further his status in parliamentary politics. In 1899, Hughes played a key role in the revival of the Sydney Wharf Labourers' Union, which had struggled for relevance since the 1890 Australian maritime dispute. He was elected as its secretary, although he typically did not involve himself in its day-to-day activities due to his political commitments. Hughes was immensely popular with the membership of the Labourers' Union and emphasised the need for solidarity to present a united front against large stevedoring firms and shipowners. By doing so he increased the union's bargaining power and was able to negotiate uniform working conditions with employers, later making regular appearances on behalf of the union at arbitration court hearings and securing the first industrial award for the industry.

In 1901, Hughes became the inaugural president of the Trolley, Draymen and Carters' Union, primarily covering workers transporting goods to the waterfront. In the same year he played a leading role in the creation of the Waterside Workers' Federation of Australia, a federal body covering the waterside unions of all major Australian ports. He was elected as the inaugural president in 1902. By this point Hughes had established himself as "perhaps the most powerful and certainly the most spectacularly successful leader in the Australian industrial field since the rise of the Australian Workers' Union two decades before".

Hughes continued to hold his union offices as his political career advanced, even after his appointment as cabinet minister and prime minister. In early 1908 he played a key role in industrial action designed to compel the Coastal Steamship Owners' Association to adhere to uniform pay rates and working conditions and to only employ union members. A strike began in Newcastle in January 1908 and quickly developed into an illegal general strike among wharf labourers, despite the opposition of Hughes who feared it would be counterproductive and could destroy goodwill among the general public. Hughes instead secured cooperation from the Trolley, Draymen and Carters' Union, Seamen's Union of Australia and the Merchant Services Guild, using legal secondary boycott tactics to force the coastal companies into using strikebreakers. A settlement was reached in April 1908, with the union's goals accomplished.

== Early years in federal politics ==
=== First federal parliament ===
Hughes was elected to the new House of Representatives at the inaugural 1901 federal election, winning the seat of West Sydney which included his pre-existing New South Wales constituency. He stood with the endorsement of the New South Wales Political Labor League and subsequently became an inaugural member of the parliamentary Australian Labor Party (ALP) upon its creation after the election.

Hughes opposed the Barton government's proposals for a small professional army and instead advocated compulsory universal training. In 1903, he was admitted to the bar after several years part-time study. He became a King's Counsel (KC) in 1909.

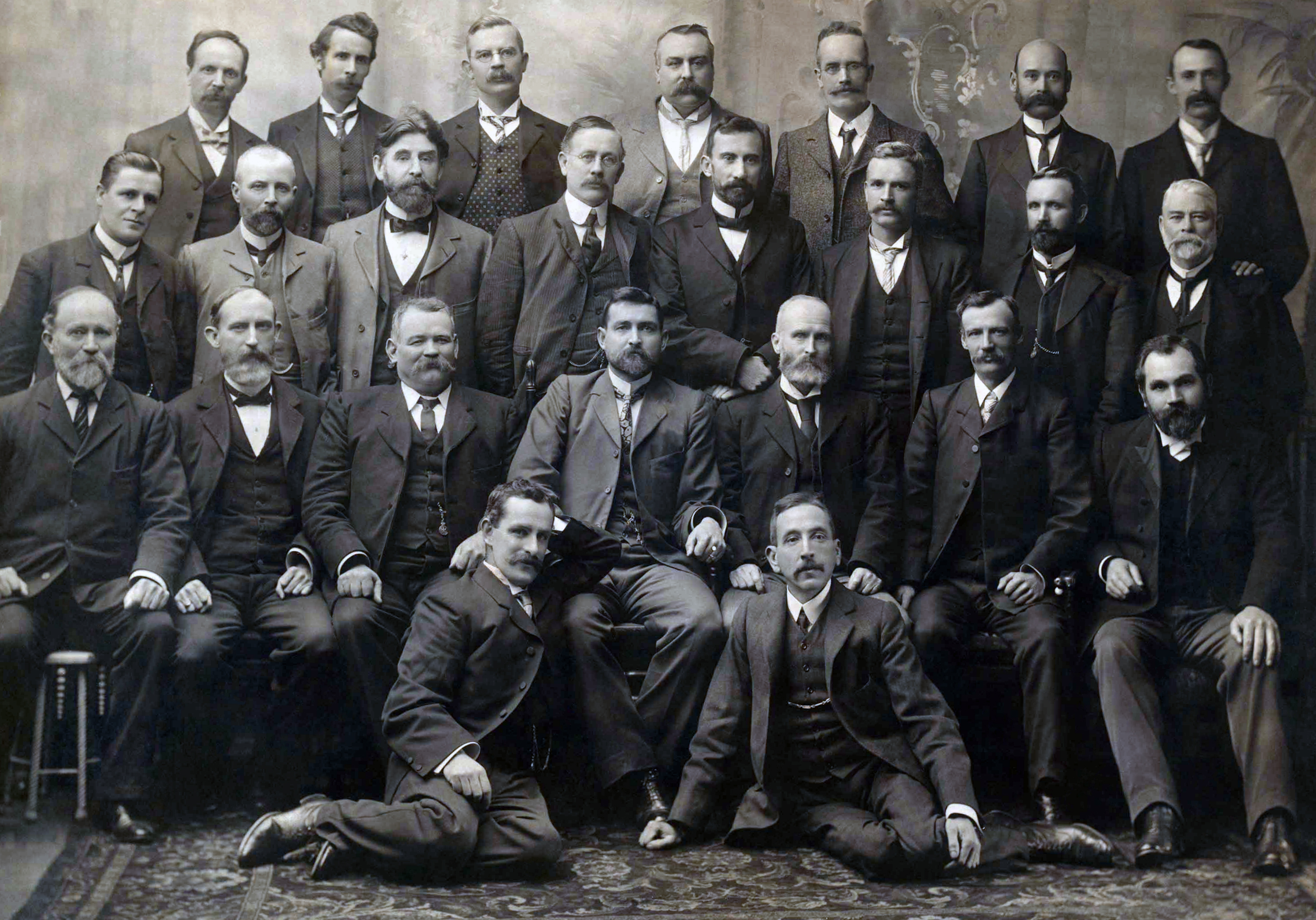
Group photograph of all Federal Labour Party MPs elected at the inaugural 1901 election, including Chris Watson, Andrew Fisher, Hughes, and Frank Tudor

=== Watson government, 1904 ===
The 1903 election left the ALP with the balance of power in parliament. Deakin's government collapsed in 1904 and Watson formed the first national ALP government. Hughes was given second rank in cabinet and was appointed minister for external affairs, the first time the post had not been held simultaneously by the prime minister. He had been offered the post of attorney-general but declined on the grounds of inexperience.

In the short-lived Watson government, Hughes' primary concern was migration, which then primarily fell under the control of his department. He took a hardline stance on the White Australia policy, personally reviewing exemption applications from Chinese and Japanese seeking to work in northern Australia. He supported the importation of Italian workers as a replacement for Kanakas on the Queensland sugarfields, but only if they were skilled labourers. Following the signing of the Entente Cordiale between Britain and France, Hughes lobbied the British government against the proposal for the New Hebrides to become a condominium. He was also responsible for the administration of British New Guinea and established a royal commission in response to allegations of misconduct by the administration on Goaribari Island.

=== ALP deputy leadership, 1907–1915 ===
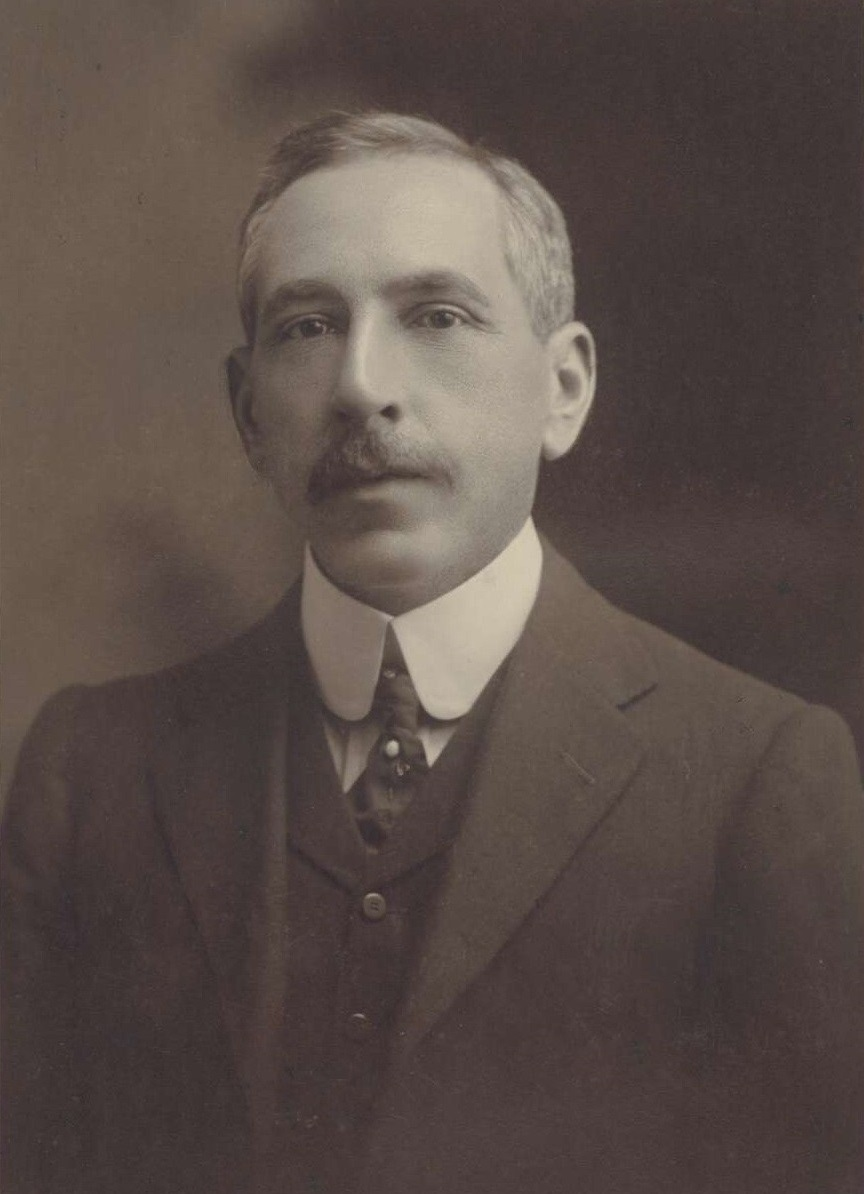
Hughes in 1908

In October 1907, Hughes was elected deputy leader of the ALP under Andrew Fisher, following Watson's retirement. He was appointed attorney-general when Fisher formed a minority government in November 1908, which was again short-lived and was unable to pass little legislation before its defeat in June 1909. During his periods in opposition, Hughes developed his legal practice – primarily appearing for trade union clients – and wrote a long-running column for Sydney's Daily Telegraph titled "The Case for Labor". According to his biographer L. F. Fitzhardinge, between 1907 and 1910 he "established himself as the leading popular exponent of the ideas of the Labor Party, a fluent and facile journalist with an individual style".

Hughes returned as attorney-general in the second Fisher government following the ALP's landslide victory over the Liberals at the 1910 election. He played a key role in the implementation of the government's substantial legislative agenda, as the only member of cabinet with legal training, and was acting prime minister on several occasions while Fisher was overseas. A key focus of Hughes' attention was the unsettled matter of federal government power, which the High Court at the time viewed as constitutionally constrained by the states' reserved powers and the implied immunity of instrumentalities. He sought to amend the constitution to give the government more explicit powers over economic matters, but two proposed amendments were rejected at a referendum in 1911.

In 1912, following a series of High Court decisions that conflicted with the government's agenda, Hughes sought to "pack the court" with additional judges whom he perceived to be favourable to federal supremacy. His nominations of Albert Piddington and Charles Powers were controversial for that reason, with Piddington resigning after less than a month on the court. Hughes continued to seek constitutional reform and put forward a further six proposed amendments. All were narrowly defeated at the referendum held in 1913.

In 1913, at the foundation ceremony of Canberra as the capital of Australia, Hughes gave a speech proclaiming that the country was obtained via the elimination of the indigenous population. "We were destined to have our own way from the beginning..[and]..killed everybody else to get it," Hughes said, adding that "the first historic event in the history of the Commonwealth we are engaged in today [is] without the slightest trace of that race we have banished from the face of the earth." But he warned that "we must not be too proud lest we should, too, in time disappear."

== Prime minister, 1915–1923 ==
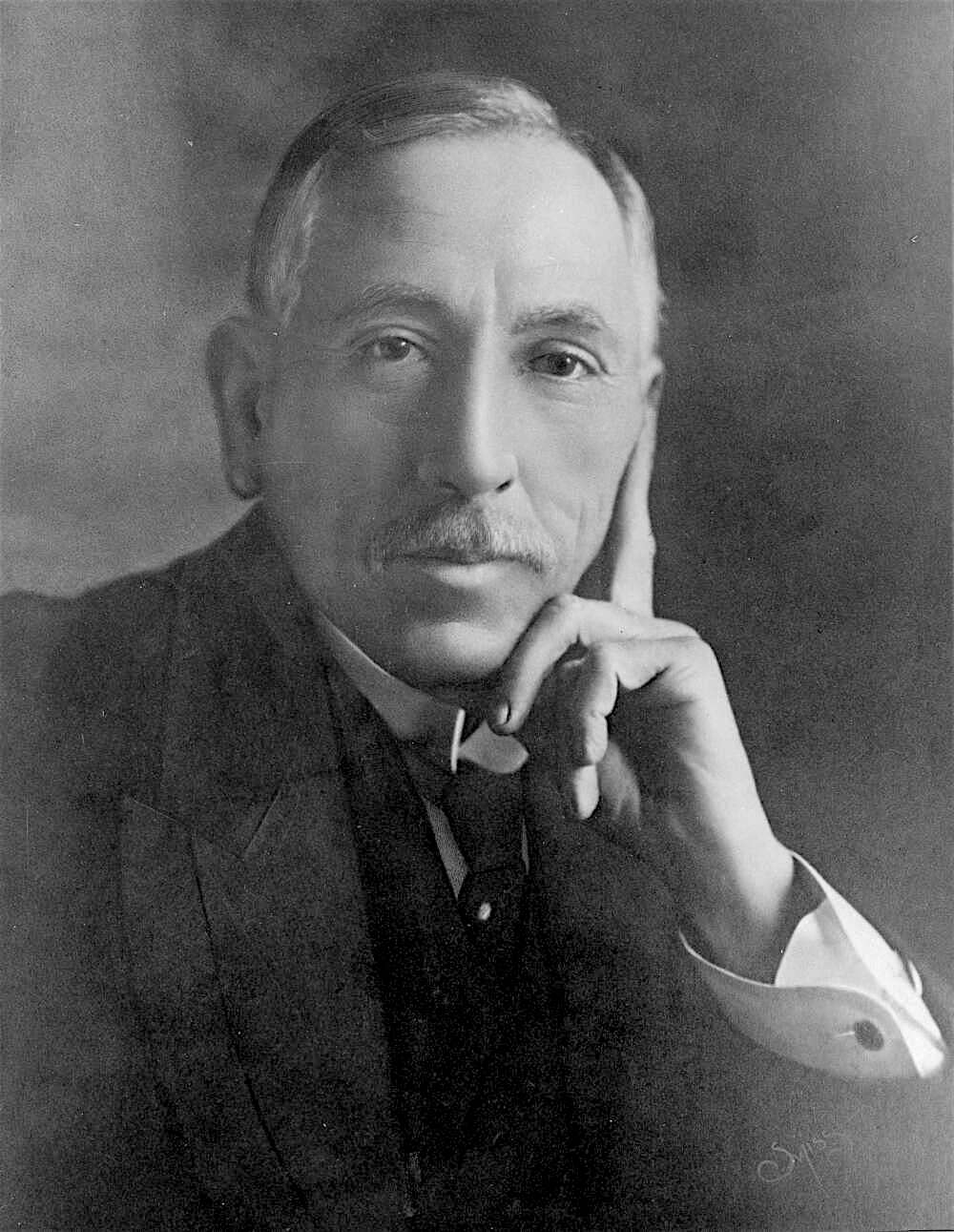
Hughes as prime minister

=== ALP prime minister, 1915–1916 ===
Following the 1914 Australian federal election, the Labor prime minister of Australia, Andrew Fisher, found the strain of leadership during World War I taxing and faced increasing pressure from the ambitious Hughes who wanted Australia to be firmly recognised on the world stage. By 1915 Fisher's health was suffering and, in October, he resigned and was succeeded by Hughes. In social policy, Hughes introduced an institutional pension for pensioners in benevolent asylums, equal to the difference between the 'act of grace' payment to the institution and the rate of IP.

From March to June 1916, Hughes was in Britain, where he delivered a series of speeches calling for imperial co-operation and economic warfare against Germany. These were published under the title The Day—and After, which was a bestseller. His biographer, Laurie Fitzhardinge, said these speeches were "electrifying" and that Hughes "swept his hearers off their feet". According to two contemporary writers, Hughes's speeches "have in particular evoked intense approbation, and have been followed by such a quickening power of the national spirit as perhaps no other orator since Chatham ever aroused".

In July 1916 Hughes was a member of the British delegation at the Paris Economic Conference, which met to decide what economic measures to take against Germany. This was the first time an Australian representative had attended an international conference.

==== Conscription crisis and ALP split ====
Hughes was a strong supporter of Australia's participation in World War I and, after the loss of 28,000 men as casualties (killed, wounded and missing) in July and August 1916, Generals Birdwood and White of the First Australian Imperial Force (AIF) persuaded Hughes that conscription was necessary if Australia was to sustain its contribution to the war effort.

However, a two-thirds majority of his party, which included Roman Catholics and trade union representatives as well as the Industrialists (Socialists) such as Frank Anstey, were bitterly opposed to this, especially in the wake of what was regarded by many Irish Australians (most of whom were Roman Catholics) as Britain's excessive response to the Easter Rising of 1916.

In October, Hughes held a national plebiscite for conscription, but it was narrowly defeated. The enabling legislation was the Military Service Referendum Act 1916 and the outcome was advisory only. The narrow defeat (1,087,557 Yes and 1,160,033 No), however, did not deter Hughes, who continued to argue vigorously in favour of conscription. This revealed the deep and bitter split within the Australian community that had existed since before Federation, as well as within the members of his own party.

Conscription had been in place since the 1910 Defence Act, but only in the defence of the nation. Hughes was seeking via a referendum to change the wording in the act to include "overseas". A referendum was not necessary but Hughes felt that in light of the seriousness of the situation, a vote of "Yes" from the people would give him a mandate to bypass the Senate. The Lloyd George Government of Britain did favour Hughes but only came to power in early December 1916, over a month after the first referendum. The predecessor Asquith government greatly disliked Hughes considering him to be "a guest, rather than the representative of Australia". According to David Lloyd George: "He and Asquith did not get on too well. They would not. They were antipathetic types. As Hughes was never over-anxious to conceal his feelings or restrain his expression of them, and was moreover equipped with a biting tongue, the consultations between them were not agreeable to either".

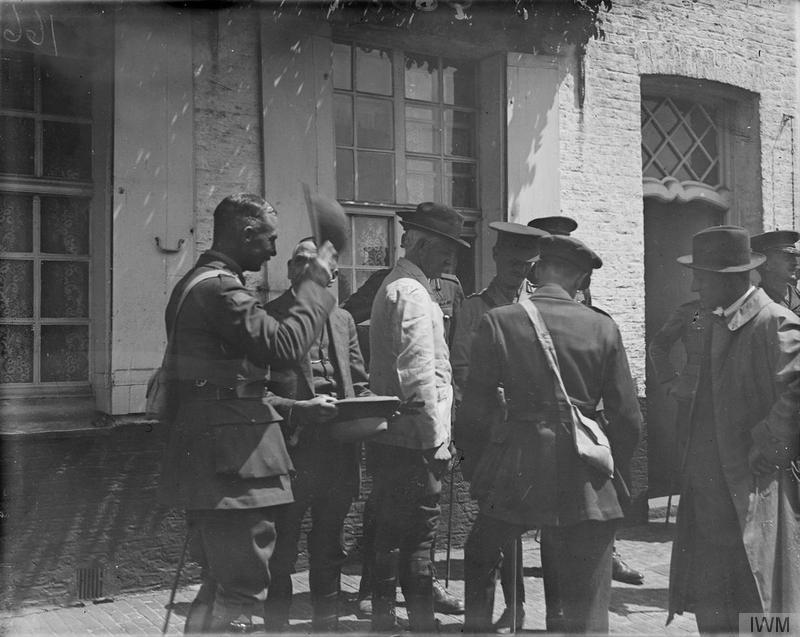
The Right Honourable William Morris Hughes, Prime Minister of Australia, and the Right Honourable Andrew Fisher, Australian High Commissioner to the United Kingdom, in conversation with staff officers of the Australian and New Zealand Army Corps (ANZAC).

In reaction to Hughes's campaign for conscription, on 15 September 1916 the NSW executive of the Political Labour League (the state Labor Party organisation at the time) expelled him and other leading New South Wales pro-conscription advocates from the Labor movement. Hughes remained as leader of the federal parliamentary Labor Party until, at 14 November caucus meeting, a no-confidence motion against him was passed. Hughes and 24 others, including almost all of the Parliamentary talent, walked out to form a new party heeding Hughes's cry "Let those who think like me, follow me." This left behind the 43 members of the Industrialists and Unionists factions. That same evening Hughes tendered his resignation to the governor-general, received a commission to form a new Government, and had his recommendations accepted. Years later, Hughes said, "I did not leave the Labor Party, The party left me." The timing of Hughes's expulsion from the Labor Party meant that he became the first Labor leader who never led the party to an election. On 15 November, Frank Tudor was elected unopposed as the new leader of the Federal Parliamentary Australian Labor Party.

=== Nationalist Party ===
Animated cartoon of Billy Hughes by Harry Julius (1915)

Hughes and his followers, which included many of Labor's early leaders, called themselves the National Labor Party and began laying the groundwork for forming a party that they felt would be both avowedly nationalist as well as socially radical. Hughes was forced to conclude a confidence and supply agreement with the opposition Commonwealth Liberal Party to stay in office.

A few months later, the governor-general, Ronald Munro Ferguson, 1st Viscount Novar, persuaded Hughes and Liberal Party leader Joseph Cook (himself a former Labor man) to turn their wartime coalition into a formal party. This was the Nationalist Party of Australia, which was formally launched in February. Although the Liberals were the larger partner in the merger, Hughes emerged as the new party's leader, with Cook as his deputy. The presence of several working-class figures—including Hughes—in what was basically an upper- and middle-class party allowed the Nationalists to convey an image of national unity. At the same time, he became and remains a traitor in Labor histories.

At the 1917 Australian federal election Hughes and the Nationalists won a huge electoral victory, which was magnified by the large number of Labor MPs who followed him out of the party. At this election Hughes gave up his working-class Sydney seat and was elected for the Division of Bendigo, after he won the seat by defeating the sitting Labor MP Alfred Hampson, and both marks the only time that a sitting prime minister had challenged and ousted another sitting MP for his seat along with him becoming the first of only a handful of Members of the Australian Parliament who have represented more than one state or territory.

Hughes had promised to resign if his Government did not win the power to conscript. Queensland Premier T. J. Ryan was a key opponent to conscription, and violence almost broke out when Hughes ordered a raid on the Government Printing Office in Brisbane, with the aim of confiscating copies of Hansard that covered debates in the Queensland Parliament where anti-conscription sentiments had been aired. A second plebiscite on conscription was held in December 1917, but was again defeated, this time by a wider margin. Hughes, after receiving a vote of confidence in his leadership by his party, resigned as prime minister. However, there were no credible alternative candidates. For this reason, Munro-Ferguson used his reserve power to immediately re-commission Hughes, thus allowing him to remain as prime minister while keeping his promise to resign.

=== Domestic policy ===
==== Electoral reform ====
The government replaced the first-past-the-post electoral system applying to both houses of the Federal Parliament under the Commonwealth Electoral Act 1903 with a preferential system for the House of Representatives in 1918. That preferential system has essentially applied ever since. A multiple majority-preferential system was introduced at the 1919 Australian federal election for the Senate, and that remained in force until it was changed to a quota-preferential system of proportional representation in 1948. Those changes were considered to be a response to the emergence of the Country Party, so that the non-Labor vote would not be split, as it would have been under the previous first-past-the-post system.

==== Science and industry ====
===== Research body =====
In early 1916, Hughes established the Advisory Council on Science and Industry, the first national body for scientific research and the first iteration of what is now the Commonwealth Scientific and Industrial Research Organisation (CSIRO). The council had no basis in legislation, and was intended only as a temporary body to be replaced with "Bureau of Science and Industry" as soon as possible. However, due to wartime stresses and other considerations the council endured until 1920, at which point an act of parliament was passed transforming it into a new government agency, the Institute of Science and Industry. According to Fitzhardinge: "The whole affair was highly typical of Hughes's methods. An idea coming from outside happened to chime with his preoccupation of the moment. He seized it, put his own stamp on it, and pushed it through to the point of realization. Then, having established the machinery, he expected it to run itself while he turned his full energies elsewhere, and tended to be evasive or testy if he was called back to it. Yet his interest was genuine, and without his enthusiasm and drive the Commonwealth intervention would either not have come at all or would have been far slower".

===== Aviation =====
It was a scheme of Hughes' devising that set the scene for long-distance civil aviation in Australia. His interest in the possibilities of peacetime aviation was sparked by his flights travelling between London and Paris for the Paris Peace Conference. On a Christmas visit the year before, in 1918, to wounded servicemen convalescing in Kent, Hughes had met Australian pilots who were facing the seven-week sea voyage home and were eager to pioneer an air route and fly to Australia instead. Such a vast distance had never been attempted by air; the first ocean crossing by aircraft occurred only months later in June 1919. Despite the risks of such a venture, Hughes' eagerness to see Australia at the forefront of technological development and in a central position in world affairs, had him seeking the support of his cabinet for a scheme to establish a Britain–Australia route. A February 1919 cable from Hughes said: "Several Australian aviators are desirous of attempting flight London to Australia they are all first-class men and very keen your thoughts", and also advised the cabinet of the advantages that such a groundbreaking flight would offer Australia: "would be a great advertisement for Australia and would concentrate the eyes of the world on us."

A month later, the acting prime minister of Australia, William Watt, announced: "With a view to stimulating aerial activity, the Commonwealth Government has decided to offer £10,000 for the first successful flight to Australia from Great Britain." The reward would go to the first crew to complete the journey in under thirty days. Brothers Ross and Keith Smith, pilot and navigator, and mechanics Walter Shiers and Jim Bennett won the prize when their Vickers Vimy G-EAOU twin engine plane landed in Darwin on 10 December 1919. The flight set a record for distance travelled by aircraft, having flown 17,911 kilometres (11,129 mi), surpassing the previous record of 5,140 kilometres (3,190 mi) set the year before on a Cairo to Delhi flight. Hughes achieved his aim of garnering world press attention for Australia, while Australia's first, and one of the world's earliest airlines, Qantas, was founded in 1920, commencing international passenger flights in 1935. A cofounder of the airline, Hudson Fysh, who had been commissioned by the government to survey landing fields in northern Australia for the competition, was present to greet the crew of the Vimy when it landed.

=== Paris Peace Conference ===
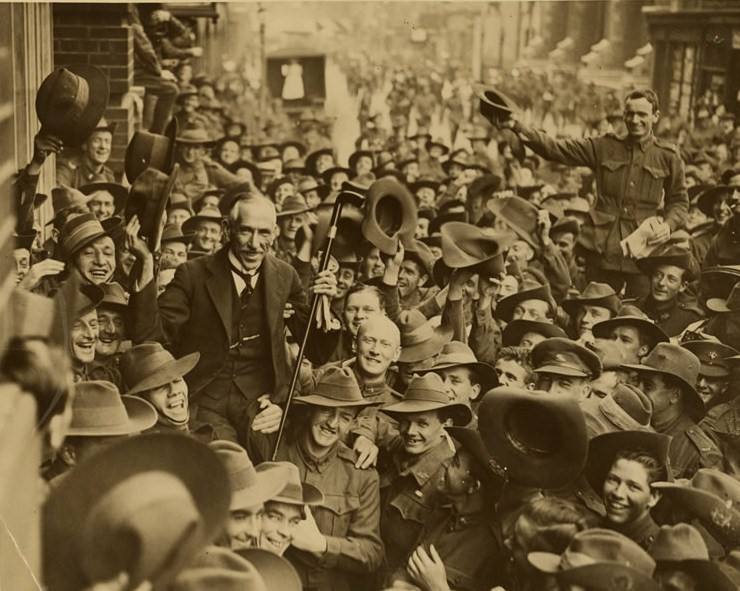
Australian soldiers carrying the "Little Digger" down George Street, Sydney, after Hughes returned from the Paris Peace Conference

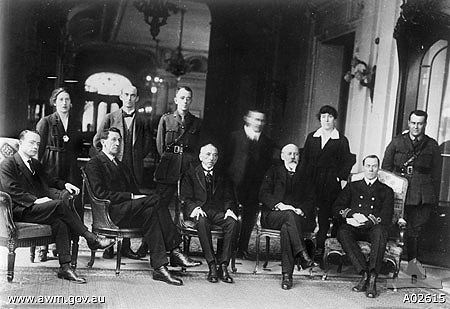
Paris 1919 Australian delegation

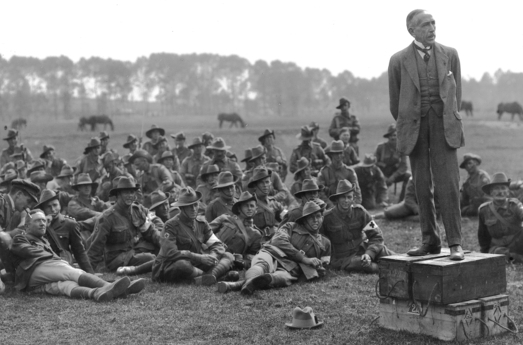
Hughes addressing the fifth Australian Field Ambulance, in France

In 1919 Hughes, with former prime minister Joseph Cook, travelled to Paris to attend the Versailles Peace Conference. He remained away for 16 months, and signed the Treaty of Versailles on behalf of Australia – the first time Australia had signed an international treaty.

At a meeting of the Imperial War Cabinet on 30 December 1918, Hughes warned that if they "were not very careful, we should find ourselves dragged quite unnecessarily behind the wheels of President Wilson's chariot". He added that it was intolerable for Wilson "to dictate to us how the world was to be governed. If the saving of civilisation had depended on the United States, it would have been in tears and chains to-day". He also said that Wilson had no practical scheme for a League of Nations and added: "The League of Nations was to him what a toy was to a child—he would not be happy till he got it". At the Paris Peace Conference, Hughes clashed with Wilson. When Wilson reminded him that he spoke for only a few million people, Hughes replied: "I speak for 60,000 dead. How many do you speak for?"

Australia wanted to keep New Guinea while New Zealand wanted Samoa, and South Africa wanted South West Africa. In the end they were given these territories as "Class C Mandates." Likewise Japan obtained control over its occupied German possessions north of the equator. At the meeting of 30 January, Hughes clashed with Wilson on the question of mandates, as Hughes wanted full sovereignty. According to the British prime minister, David Lloyd George, Wilson was dictatorial and arrogant in his approach to Hughes. Lloyd George described how, after Hughes stated his case against mandate status:

President Wilson pulled him up sharply and proceeded to address him personally in what I would describe as a heated allocution rather than an appeal. He dwelt on the seriousness of defying world opinion on this subject. Mr. Hughes, who listened intently. . . indicated at the end that he was still of the same opinion. Whereupon the President asked him slowly and solemnly: "Mr. Hughes, am I to understand that if the whole civilised world asks Australia to agree to a mandate in respect of these islands, Australia is prepared still to defy the appeal of the whole civilised world?” Mr. Hughes answered: "That's about the size of it, President Wilson". Mr. Massey grunted his assent of this abrupt defiance.

However, South Africa's Louis Botha intervened on Wilson's side, and the mandates scheme went through. Hughes's frequent clashes with Wilson led to Wilson labelling him a "pestiferous varmint".

Hughes, unlike Wilson or South African prime minister Jan Smuts, demanded heavy reparations from Germany, suggesting the sum of £24,000,000,000 of which Australia would claim many millions to off-set its own war debt. Hughes was a member of the British delegation on the Reparations Committee, with Walter Cunliffe, 1st Baron Cunliffe and John Hamilton, 1st Viscount Sumner. When the Imperial Cabinet met to discuss the Hughes Report, Winston Churchill asked Hughes if he had considered the effects that reparations would have on working-class German households. Hughes replied that "the Committee had been more concerned in considering the effects upon the working-class households in Great Britain, or in Australia, if the Germans did not pay an indemnity".

At the Treaty negotiations, Hughes was the most prominent opponent of the inclusion of Japan's Racial Equality Proposal, which as a result of lobbying by him and others was not included in the final Treaty. His position on this issue reflected the racist attitudes dominant among white Australians; informing Lloyd George that he would leave the conference if the clause was adopted. Hughes clarified his opposition by announcing at a meeting that "ninety-five out of one hundred Australians rejected the very idea of equality." Hughes offered to accept the clause so long as it did not affect immigration policy but the Japanese turned the offer down. Lloyd George said that the clause "was aimed at the restrictions and disabilities which were imposed by certain states against Japanese emigration and Japanese settlers already within their borders".

Hughes had entered politics as a trade unionist, and like most of the Australian working class was very strongly opposed to Asian immigration to Australia (excluding Asian immigration was a popular cause with labour unions in Canada, the U.S., Australia and New Zealand in the early 20th century). Hughes believed that accepting the Racial Equality Clause would mean the end of the White Australia policy that had been adopted in 1901, one of his subordinates writing: "No Gov't could live for a day in Australia if it tampered with a White Australia ...The position is this – either the Japanese proposal means something or it means nothing: if the former, out with it; if the latter, why have it?" He later said that "the right of the state to determine the conditions under which persons shall enter its territories cannot be impaired without reducing it to a vassal state", adding: "When I offered to accept it provided that words were incorporated making it clear that it was not to be used for the purpose of immigration or of impairing our rights of self-government in any way, [the Japanese delegate] Baron Makino was unable to agree".

When the proposal failed, Hughes reported in the Australian parliament:

The White Australia is yours. You may do with it what you please, but at any rate, the soldiers have achieved the victory and my colleagues and I have brought that great principle back to you from the conference, as safe as it was on the day when it was first adopted.

Japan was notably offended by Hughes's position on the issue. Like Jan Smuts of South Africa, Hughes was concerned by the rise of Japan. Within months of the declaration of the European War in 1914, Japan, Australia and New Zealand had seized all German territorial possessions in the Pacific. Though Japan had occupied German possessions with the blessing of the British, Hughes felt alarm at this turn of events.

With reference to Hughes's actions at the Peace Conference, the historian Ernest Scott said that although Hughes failed to secure sovereignty over the conquered German islands or relief for Australia's war debts, "both he and his countrymen found satisfaction with his achievements. By characteristic methods he had gained single-handed at least the points that were vital to his nation's existence". Joan Beaumont said Hughes became "something of a folk hero in later Australian historiography for his assertiveness at the Paris peace conference".

Seth Tillman described him as "a noisesome demagogue", the "bete noir [sic] of Anglo-American relations". Unlike Smuts, Hughes opposed the concept of the League of Nations, as in it he saw the flawed idealism of "collective security". He declared in June 1919 that Australia would rely on the League "but we shall keep our powder dry".

On returning home from the conference, he was greeted with a welcome "unsurpassed in the history of Australia" which historian Ann Moyal says was the highpoint of his career.

=== 1920–1923 ===
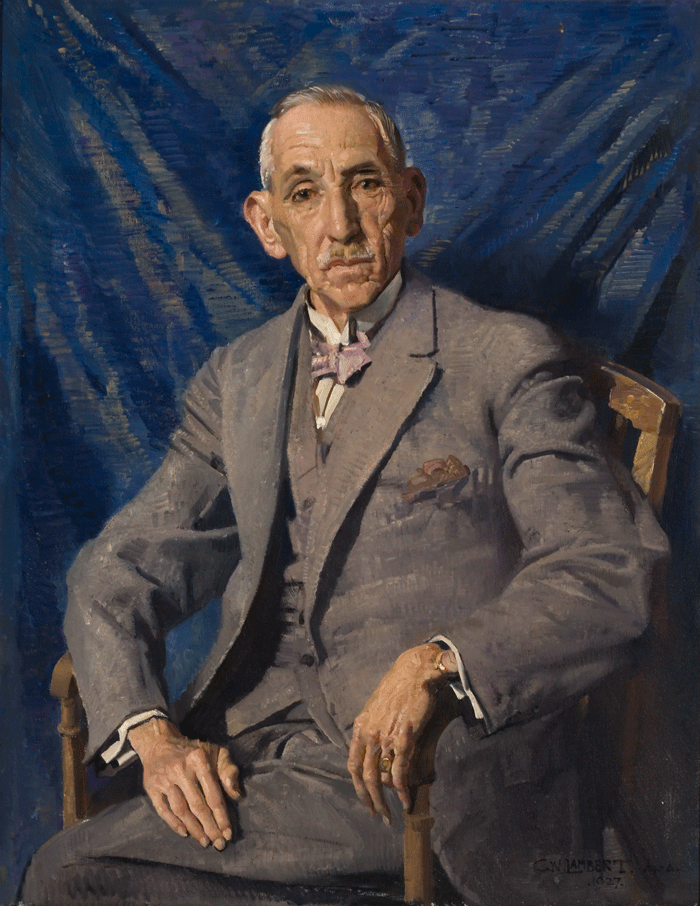
Parliament House portrait of Hughes by George Washington Lambert, 1927

Hughes demanded that Australia have independent representation within the newly-formed League of Nations. Despite the rejection of his conscription policy, Hughes retained popularity with Australian voters and, at the 1919 Australian federal election, his government was comfortably re-elected.

After 1920, Hughes's political position declined. Many of the more conservative elements of his own party never trusted him because they thought he was still a socialist at heart, citing his interest in retaining government ownership of the Commonwealth Line and AWA. However, they continued to support him for some time after the war, if only to keep Labor out of power.

A new party, the Country Party, was formed, representing farmers who were discontented with the Nationalists' rural policies, in particular Hughes's acceptance of a much higher level of tariff protection for Australian industries, that had expanded during the war, and his support for price controls on rural produce. In the 1922 New Year Honours, Hughes's wife Mary was appointed a Dame Grand Cross of the Order of the British Empire (GBE).

At the 1921 Imperial Conference, Hughes argued unsuccessfully in favour of renewing the Anglo-Japanese Alliance.

At the 1922 Australian federal election, Hughes gave up the seat of Bendigo and transferred to the upper-middle-class Division of North Sydney, thus giving up one of the last symbolic links to his working-class roots. The Nationalists lost their outright majority at the election. The Country Party, despite its opposition to Hughes's farm policy, was the Nationalists' only realistic coalition partner. However, party leader Earle Page let it be known that he and his party would not serve under Hughes. Under pressure from his party's right wing, Hughes resigned in February 1923 and was succeeded by his Treasurer, Stanley Bruce. His eight-year tenure was the longest for a prime minister until Robert Menzies passed him in 1957.

Whilst the incumbent prime minister, Hughes switched seats at both the 1917 and 1922 elections, the only prime minister to have done so not once but twice. All other elections have seen the prime minister re-contest the seat that they held prior to the election.

== Political eclipse and re-emergence ==
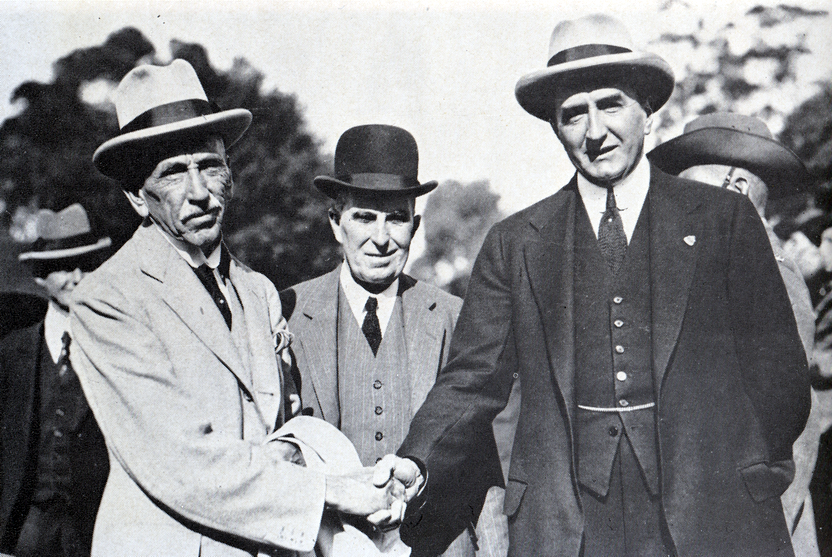
Hughes in 1925 shaking hands with his successor S. M. Bruce (Herbert Pratten at centre)

Hughes played little part in parliament for the remainder of 1923. He rented a house in Kirribilli, New South Wales in his new electorate and was recruited by The Daily Telegraph to write a series of articles on topics of his choosing. In the articles he defended his legacy as prime minister and stated he would support the new government as long as it followed his principles. In 1924, Hughes embarked on a lecture tour of the United States. His health broke down midway through the tour, while he was in New York. As a result he cancelled the rest of his engagements and drove back across the country in a new Flint automobile, which he brought back to Australia. Later in the year he purchased a house in Lindfield, which was to be his primary residence for the rest of his life. In 1925 Hughes again had little involvement in parliamentary affairs, but began to portray himself as "champion of Australian industries struggling to get established against foreign competition and government indifference", with the aid of his friends James Hume Cook and Ambrose Pratt.

Hughes was furious at being ousted by his own party and nursed his grievance on the back-benches until 1929, when he led a group of back-bench rebels who crossed the floor of the Parliament to bring down the Bruce government. Hughes was expelled from the Nationalist Party, and formed his own party, the Australian Party. After the Nationalists were heavily defeated in the ensuing election, Hughes initially supported the Labor government of James Scullin. He had a falling-out with Scullin over financial matters, however. In 1931 he buried the hatchet with his former non-Labor colleagues and joined the Nationalists and several right-wing Labor dissidents under Joseph Lyons in forming the United Australia Party (UAP), under Lyons' leadership. He voted with the rest of the UAP to bring the Scullin government down.

== United Australia Party and World War II ==
=== Lyons government, 1931–1939 ===
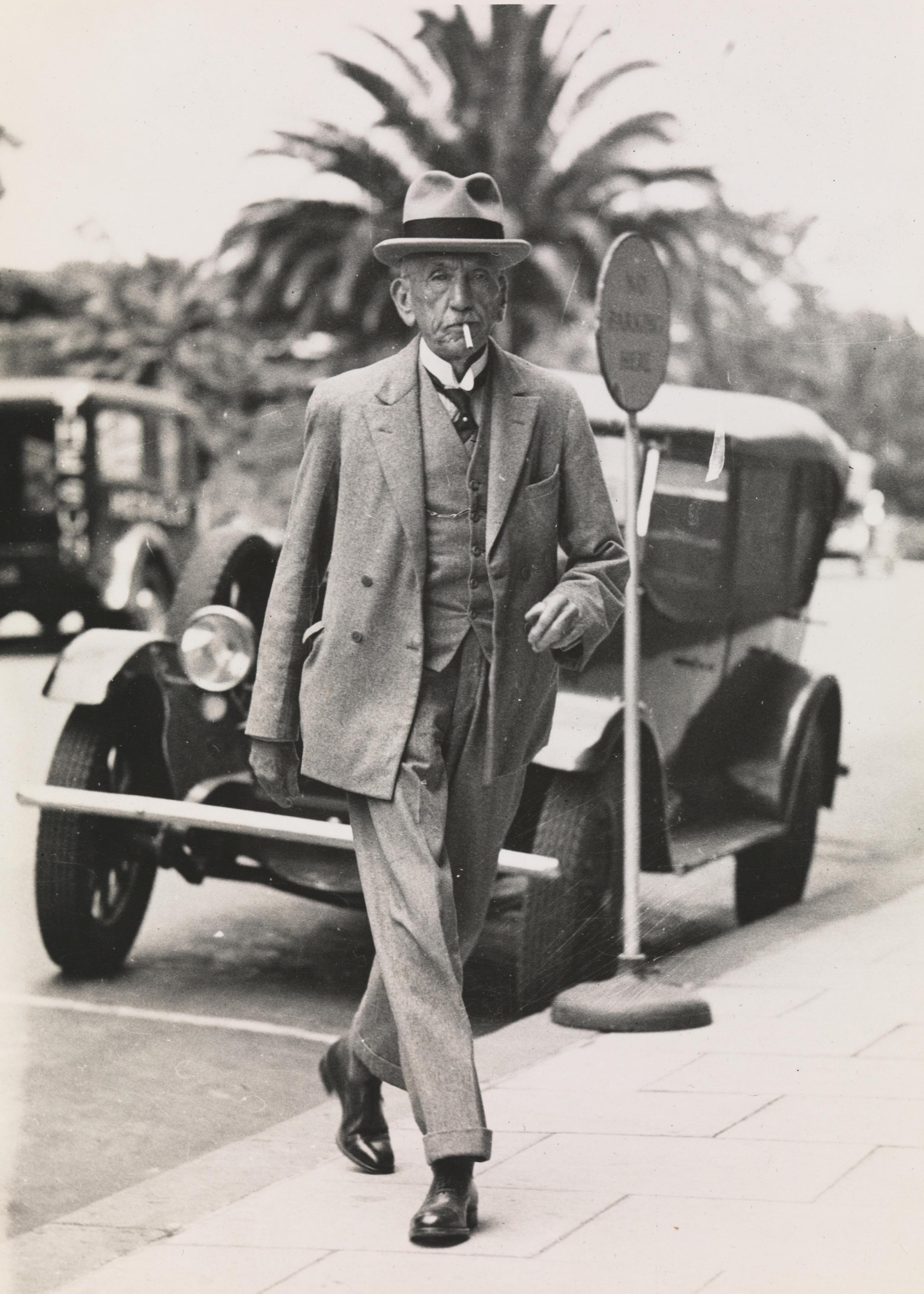
Hughes in Sydney in the 1930s

The UAP won a sweeping victory at the 1931 election. Lyons sent Hughes to represent Australia at the 1932 League of Nations Assembly in Geneva and in 1934 Hughes became Minister for Health and Repatriation in the Lyons government. Later Lyons appointed him Minister for External Affairs, but Hughes was forced to resign in 1935 after his book Australia and the War Today exposed a lack of preparation in Australia for what Hughes correctly supposed to be a coming war. Soon after, the Lyons government tripled the defence budget. Hughes also wrote in Australia and the War Today that the League of Nations was broken and that it could have worked only if it had been backed by force. He believed that every nation must look to its own defences and that, as Britain was preoccupied in European affairs, Australia would have to defend itself.

After the 1931 Japanese invasion of Manchuria, Hughes believed that the British should remain neutral, and adopted the same attitude towards Italy's invasion of Abyssinia in 1935. Hughes believed that the British Empire was in danger because of its weakness in the Mediterranean.

After the 1937 election, Hughes was appointed external affairs minister for a third time in place of Pearce, who had been defeated. His department had only been separated from the Prime Minister's Department in 1935 and remained small in size, with Lyons taking the primary responsibility for formulating foreign policy. In cabinet, Hughes continued to advocate for full-scale rearmament and was skeptical of the Singapore strategy. He came into public conflict with the German consul-general Rudolf Asmis on several occasions, particularly over suggestions that Australia should return Germany's former colonies.

By the time of Lyons' death in 1939, Hughes was also serving as attorney-general and minister for industry. He also was minister for the Navy, minister for industry and attorney-general at various times under Lyons' successor, Robert Menzies.

=== Menzies and Fadden governments, 1939–1941 ===
Defence issues became increasingly dominant in public affairs with the rise of Fascism in Europe and militant Japan in Asia. From 1938, Prime Minister Joseph Lyons had Hughes head a recruitment drive for the Defence Forces. On 7 April 1939, Lyons died in office. The United Australia Party selected Robert Menzies as his successor to lead a minority government on the eve of World War Two. Australia entered the Second World War on 3 September 1939 and a special War Cabinet was created after war was declared – initially composed of Prime Minister Menzies and five senior ministers including Hughes. Labor opposition leader John Curtin declined to join and Menzies lost his majority at the 1940 Election. With the Allies suffering a series of defeats and the threat of war growing in the Pacific, the Menzies government (1939-1941) relied on two independents, Arthur Coles and Alex Wilson for its parliamentary majority.

Unable to convince Curtin to join in a War Cabinet and facing growing pressure within his own party, Menzies resigned as prime minister on 29 August 1941. Although the UAP had been in government for a decade, it was so bereft of leadership that a joint UAP-Country meeting elected Country Party leader Arthur Fadden to lead the Coalition. Hughes remained in the Fadden government, serving as attorney-general and minister for the Navy. A month later, Coles and Wilson joined with the Labor opposition to defeat the budget and bring down the government. The independents, under prodding from Governor-General Alexander Hore-Ruthven, 1st Earl of Gowrie, then threw their support to Opposition Leader John Curtin, who was sworn in as prime minister on 7 October 1941.

=== UAP leader, 1941–1943 ===
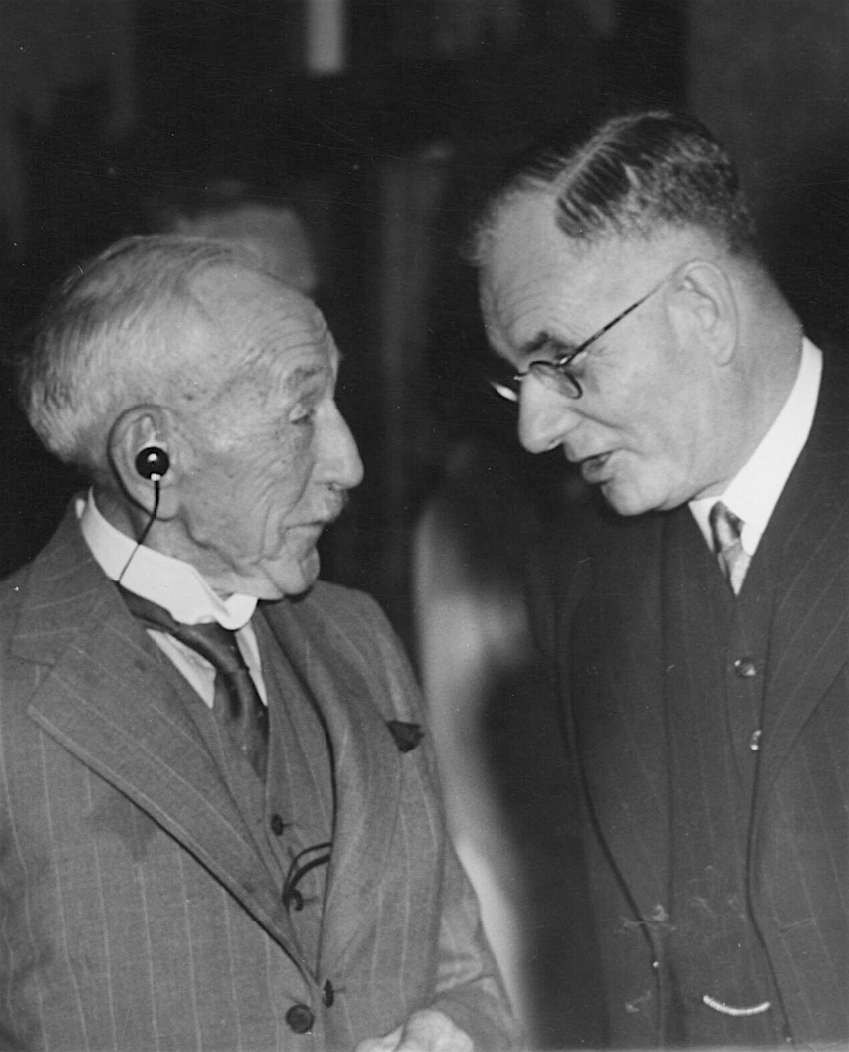
Photograph of Hughes conversing with John Curtin in 1945, wearing his hearing aid and with the apparatus bulging under his jacket

Going into opposition the UAP opted for a joint Coalition opposition led by Fadden, which led Menzies to resign the leadership. The 79-year-old Hughes was narrowly elected leader on 9 October but widely regarded as a stop-gap given his age.

On 7 December, Japan attacked Pearl Harbor. Soon afterwards, Hughes criticised the British government for their weakness in the Far East and declared that they were living on "fast-fading gleams of British triumphs in other wars". However, in February 1942 he said that "Britain has temporarily lost control of the seas but she has lost it in an effort to protect Australia. It would be well if those who criticise Britain would turn the searchlights on Australia". In August he criticised the defensive strategy of the Allies in the Pacific but after the Battle of the Solomons he praised the United States' armed forces. Hughes opposed the Curtin government's Statute of Westminster Adoption Act 1942, which incorporated sections 2–6 of the Statute of Westminster 1931 into law. He believed that Britain and the Dominions should instead work together for a common foreign policy.

Hughes led the UAP into the 1943 Australian federal election largely by refusing to hold any party meetings and by agreeing to let Fadden lead the Opposition as a whole. The Coalition was severely defeated, winning only 19 seats. Hughes himself was nearly defeated in North Sydney on a swing of over 14 percent, seeing his majority dwindle from a comfortably safe 67 percent to a marginal 53 percent. After the election, Hughes yielded the leadership of the UAP back to Menzies.

== Final years ==
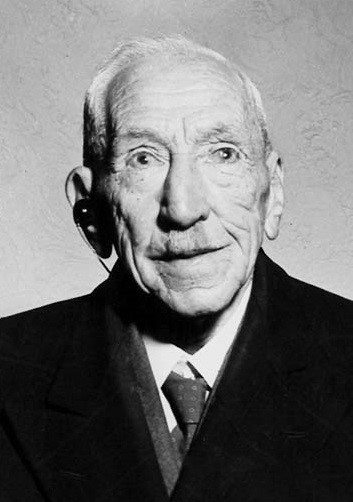
Hughes in 1945 (age 83)

In February 1944, the parliamentary UAP voted to withdraw its members from the Advisory War Council. Hughes and Menzies resigned, but Percy Spender chose to remain on the council and was expelled from the UAP. A few months later, Hughes rejoined the War Council at the personal invitation of John Curtin. He was expelled from the UAP on 14 April 1944, and replaced as deputy leader by Eric Harrison. Hughes and Spender sat as an independents until 13 September 1945, when they joined the new Liberal Party of Australia that had been founded earlier in the year. By that point the War Council had been abolished.

A major redistribution and expansion of the House of Representatives occurred prior to the 1949 election, with much of the northern portion of North Sydney transferred to the new Division of Bradfield. Hughes faced a preselection challenge for the first time since 1894, but defeated Harry Turner for Liberal Party endorsement and won a comfortable victory. He was elected to the House of Representatives for the 20th and final time at the 1951 Australian federal election, with 79 percent of the vote. Hughes's last speech in parliament was an attack on the Menzies government's decision to sell its share in Commonwealth Oil Refineries, one of the state-owned enterprises his government had established over 30 years earlier. According to H.V. Evatt, his speech "seemed at once to grip the attention of all honourable members present ... nobody left the House, and nobody seemed to dare to move".

Hughes celebrated a number of milestones in his last years in parliament. In 1944, a celebratory dinner was held to commemorate the 50th anniversary of his election to the parliament of the colony of New South Wales and thus 50 consecutive years of service as an MP. Prime Minister John Curtin toasted him as someone who had "fought like hell for what he believed to be right, and for that Australia will honour him". In June 1951, Hughes was the guest of honour at a banquet marking the golden jubilee of the federal parliament. The following year, "almost every member of the House of Representatives and Senate" attended his birthday dinner. Prime Minister Robert Menzies observed that Hughes had been a member of every political party at one time or another, at which point Arthur Fadden interjected that he had never joined the Country Party. Hughes then remarked "had to draw the line somewhere, didn't I?".

In 1946 he played himself in the film Smithy.

== Death and funeral ==
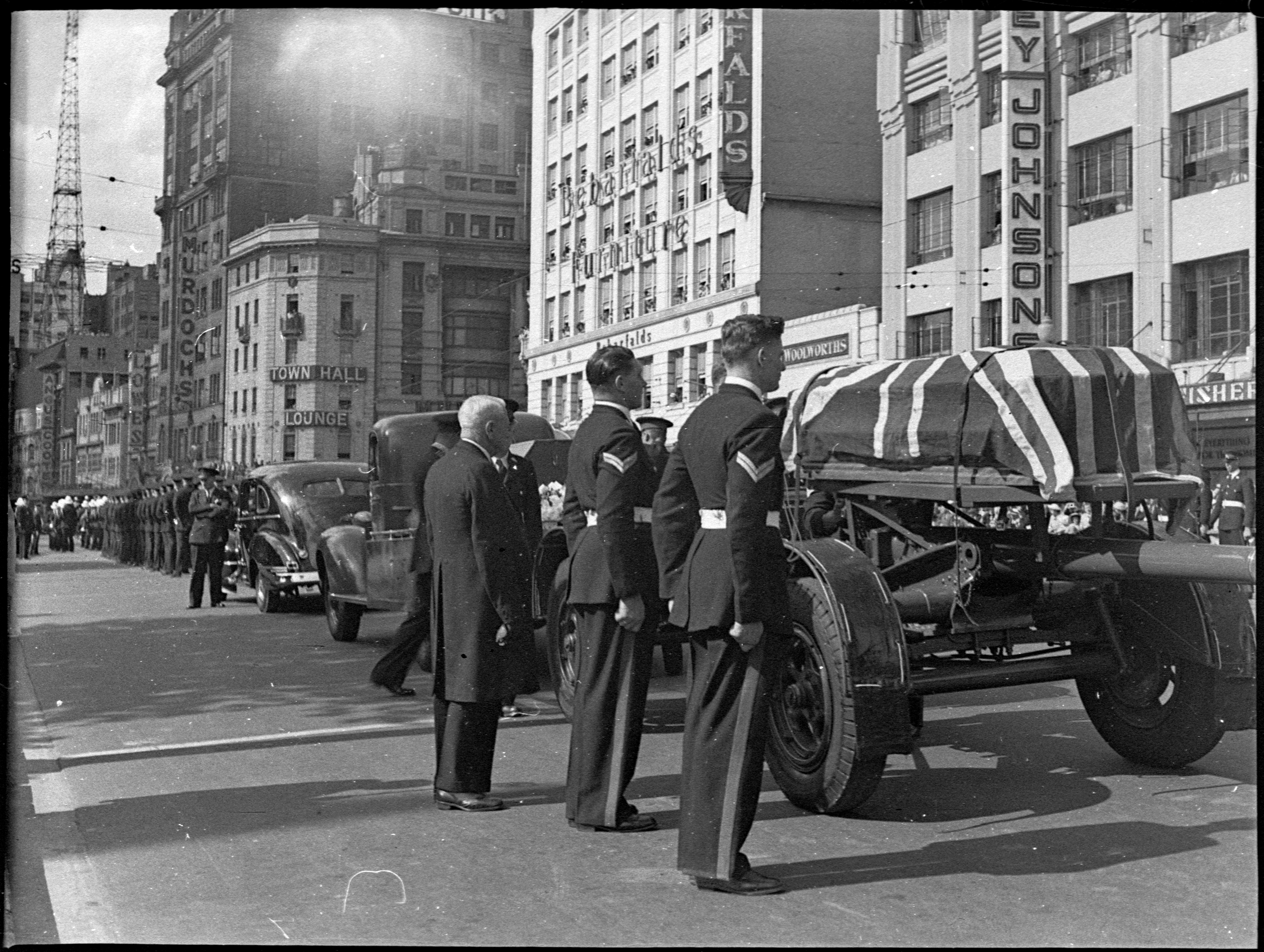
Billy Hughes' funeral, Sydney, 2 November 1952, Sam Hood

Hughes died on 28 October 1952, aged 90, at his home in Lindfield. His state funeral was held at St Andrew's Cathedral, Sydney, and was one of the largest Australia has seen: some 450,000 spectators lined the streets. He was later buried at Macquarie Park Cemetery and Crematorium with his daughter Helen; his widow Dame Mary joined them upon her death in 1958.

At the age of 90 years, one month and three days, Hughes is the oldest person ever to have been a member of the Australian parliament. His death sparked the 1952 Bradfield by-election. He had been a member of the House of Representatives for 51 years and seven months, beginning his service in the reign of Queen Victoria and ending it in the reign of Queen Elizabeth II. Including his service in the New South Wales colonial parliament before that, Hughes had spent a total of 58 years as an MP, and had never lost an election. His period of service remains a record in Australia. He was the last member of the original Australian Parliament elected in 1901 still serving in Parliament when he died. Hughes was the penultimate member of the First Parliament to die; King O'Malley outlived him by fourteen months. Hughes was also the last surviving member of the Watson Cabinet, as well as the first and third Cabinets of Andrew Fisher.

== Personal life ==
=== First marriage ===
Soon after arriving in Sydney, Hughes entered into a common-law marriage with Elizabeth Cutts, the daughter of one of his landladies at Moore Park.

Elizabeth's birth surname was Welsh, daughter of English migrants Elizabeth Ann McLellan and William Welsh (died 1867, Tarban Asylum). She changed to her grandmother's maiden name, Cutts, some time around the birth of her son Arthur.

Billy and Elizabeth raised Arthur Clifford, Elizabeth's son from a previous relationship born 1885, who took Hughes as his surname. Arthur married Mabel Prosser in 1910 and his second wife was Ida Margaret Phegan. He died in 1974 in Neutral Bay.

Billy and Elizabeth's relationship was never formally registered or solemnised, but they lived as husband and wife and had six children together:

- Ethel May also known as Edith May. Born 22 Dec 1887 or 1889 in Sydney. Married Patrick James Bourke in 1910, divorced 192. Died 21 Jan 1975 in Los Angeles, USA.
- William, born 1891, died in infancy 1892.
- Lily. Born in 1893 in Sydney. Married Thomas Dixon in 1936 in Lancashire, England. Death unconfirmed.
- Dorothea "Dolly". Born 1895, NSW.
- Ernest Morris "Billy". Born 25 Mar 1897, NSW. Married Hersee May Pidgeon in 1925, Vic. Died 13 Aug 1986, aged 89.
- Charles Leonard, Service Number 51515. Born 28 July 1899, NSW. Married Margaret Stewart Short in 1928, NZ. Died 9 Aug 1974 in Wellington, NZ, aged 75.

Their union was solid, though sometimes strained by Hughes' devotion to his work and frequent absences from home. Elizabeth had little interest in politics, and was sometimes ill at ease in the social situations that occurred as her husband's career progressed.

She died of heart failure on 1 September 1906, aged 42, after a long period of ill health, and was interred at Gore Hill Cemetery.

=== Second marriage ===
After his first wife's death, Hughes's oldest daughter Ethel kept house for him and helped look after the younger children. After a brief courtship, he remarried on 26 June 1911 to Mary Ethel Campbell, the daughter of a well-to-do pastoralist. At the time of their marriage, he was 48 and she was 37. Mary was politically and socially astute, and her husband often turned to her for advice on political matters. Unusually for the time, he insisted that he be accompanied by her on all of his overseas trips, even those made during wartime. Through his second marriage, Hughes also became the brother-in-law of John Haynes, one of the founders of The Bulletin. His niece, Edith Haynes, lived with him and his wife as a companion for many years.

Grave of Billy, Dame Mary and Helen Hughes at Macquarie Park Cemetery and Crematorium

The only child from Hughes's second marriage was Helen Beatrice Myfanwy Hughes, who was born in 1915 in Victoria, a few months before he became prime minister. He doted upon her, calling her the "joy and light of my life", and was devastated by her death in childbirth on 9 Aug 1937 in Willesden, England, aged 22.

Her son survived and was adopted by a friend of the family, with his grandfather contributing towards his upkeep. Because she was unmarried at the time, the circumstances of Helen's death were kept hidden and did not become generally known until 2004, when the ABC screened a programme presented by the actor Martin Vaughan. Vaughan had played Billy Hughes in the 1975 film Billy and Percy, and his continuing interest in him led to the unearthing of Helen's fate.

=== Health ===
Hughes had a severe hearing loss that began when he was relatively young and worsened with age. He relied on a primitive electronic hearing aid, which was so bulky that it could only be worn for short periods and had to be carried around in a box. However, his deafness could sometimes be to his advantage, as he could feign misapprehension or simply turn off his device when he no longer wished to listen to someone. Physically, Hughes was short in stature and slightly built, standing 5 ft 6 in (1.68 m) and weighing around 9 stone (57 kg) at most. He had a "naturally weak constitution", suffering frequently from colds and other infections, and to compensate became a "fanatical devotee of physical fitness". He also suffered from chronic indigestion, on account of which he abstained from red meat and alcohol and rarely ate large meals. Hughes often worked himself to exhaustion, and required long periods of convalescence to recharge – sometimes weeks or even months. He was prone to bouts of depression interspersed with periods of euphoria, and following a near nervous breakdown in 1924 was diagnosed with "psychasthenia".

=== Religion ===
Hughes was a lifelong Anglican. He inherited this affiliation from his maternal side – his father was a Primitive Baptist and a deacon at the Welsh Baptist Church in London, though he wed with Anglican rites. Hughes attended church schools as a boy, and knew the King James Bible "back to front". As an adult, he would often use Biblical turns of phrase in his writing and public speaking. Hughes's participation in organised religion seemingly declined after he moved to Australia, and some writers have suggested that he became an agnostic or an atheist. The evidence for this is largely circumstantial – he was not a regular churchgoer, his first marriage was never solemnised in a church, and he frequently used blasphemous language.

All of Hughes's biographers have regarded him as a sincere Christian, albeit with a rather idiosyncratic theology. Fitzhardinge writes that Hughes had "a generalised faith in the spiritual values of Christianity" combined with "a profound belief in the after-life and the all-pervasiveness of God". Hughes rarely addressed metaphysics in his own works, but in his memoirs did note that he had rejected the doctrine of predestination at an early age: "I believed as a man sowed so he should reap ... by faith and works he might find salvation." Manning Clark was somewhat sceptical of the earnestness of the beliefs that Hughes professed in public. With regard to Hughes's personal philosophy, Clark wrote that he had a "bleakly Hobbesian view of life", seeing it as "a savage elemental struggle for survival in which strong men crushed the weak".

Hughes frequently exploited religion for political ends. In his early days in the labour movement, he drew on his mastery of scripture to reassure Christians that socialism was not anti-religious or atheistic. Hughes became stridently anti-Catholic during World War I, though this was due to political interference from the church hierarchy rather than on theological grounds. He "inflamed sectarianism to a tragic degree" with vitriolic personal attacks on Catholic leaders; James Scullin, Australia's first Catholic prime minister, would later suggest that Hughes's divisiveness "very nearly wrecked Australia". He also banned the use of German in Australian churches, though this affected Lutherans more than Catholics.

== Legacy ==
Hughes, a tiny, wiry man, with a raspy voice and an increasingly wizened face, was an unlikely national leader, but during the First World War he acquired a reputation as a war leader—the troops called him the "Little Digger"—that sustained him for the rest of his life. He is remembered for his outstanding political and diplomatic skills, for his many witty sayings, and for his irrepressible optimism and patriotism. At the same time, the Australian labour movement never forgave him for defecting to the conservatives, and still considers him a "rat".

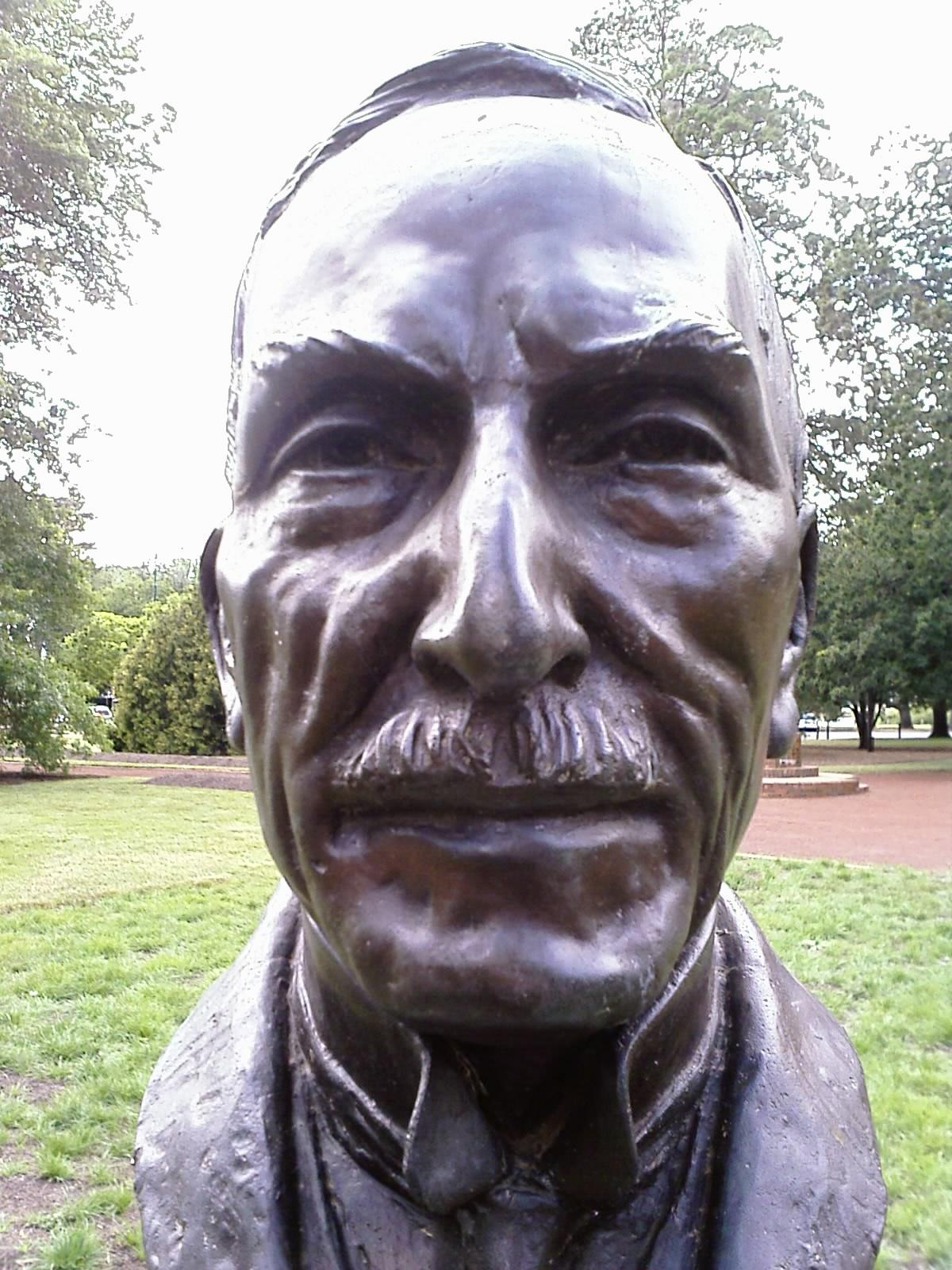
Bust of Billy Hughes by sculptor Wallace Anderson located in the Prime Ministers Avenue in the Ballarat Botanical Gardens

== Honours ==
- King's Counsel (KC), 1909
- Queen's Privy Council for Canada (PC), 1916
- Member of the Order of the Companions of Honour (CH), 1941
- Grand Officer of the Legion of Honour, 1941
- In 1916 he declined the offer of a peerage from the UK prime pinister David Lloyd George, saying Good God, David! Do you want to ruin me? I am Labor prime minister of Australia and President of the Waterside Workers' Federation. He also declined offers of knighthood.

=== Freedom of the City ===
Hughes was honored with fifteen "Freedom of the City" awards – more than any other prime minister of Australia. Among these are the following cities in the United Kingdom:

- Aberdeen, Birmingham, Bristol, Cardiff, Edinburgh, Glasgow, Liverpool, London, Manchester, Sheffield, York

=== Honorary appointments ===
Hughes received honorary degrees from the following universities:

- University of Edinburgh
- University of Glasgow
- University of Birmingham
- University of Oxford
- University of Wales

The Division of Hughes and the suburb of Hughes, Australian Capital Territory in Canberra are named after him. A park in Lane Cove, is named Hughes Park after Hughes.

In 1972, he was honoured on a postage stamp bearing his portrait issued by Australia Post.

After marrying his wife Mary in 1911, the couple went on a long drive, because he did not have time for a honeymoon. Their car crashed where the Sydney–Melbourne road crossed the Main Southern railway line north of Albury, leading to the level crossing there being named after him; it was later replaced by the Billy Hughes Bridge.

== Published works ==
- Crusts and Crusades: tales of bygone days (Sydney: Angus and Robertson, 1947).
- Policies and Potentates (Sydney: Angus and Robertson, 1950).

== See also ==
- First Hughes Ministry
- Second Hughes Ministry
- Third Hughes Ministry
- Fourth Hughes Ministry
- Fifth Hughes Ministry
- Electoral history of Billy Hughes
- Racial Equality Proposal
- Billy Hughes egg-throwing incident

== Sources and further reading ==
- Booker, Malcolm (1980). The Great Professional: A Study of W. M. Hughes. McGraw-Hill. ISBN 0070729360.
- Bridge, Carl (2011). William Hughes: Australia. Haus Publishing. ISBN 9781907822209.
- Fitzhardinge, L. F. (1964). William Morris Hughes: A Political Biography. Vol. 1: That Fiery Particle, 1862–1914. Angus & Robertson. ISBN 0207137463.
  - Fitzhardinge, L. F. (1979). William Morris Hughes: A Political Biography. Vol. 2: The Little Digger, 1914–1952. Angus & Robertson. ISBN 0207132453.
- Fitzhardinge, Laurence Frederic. "WM Hughes and the Treaty of Versailles, 1919." Journal of Commonwealth & Comparative Politics 5.2 (1967): 130-142.
- Horne, Donald (1979). In Search of Billy Hughes. Macmillan. ISBN 9780333252475.
- Hudson, W. J. (1978). Billy Hughes in Paris: The Birth of Australian Diplomacy. Australian Institute of International Affairs. ISBN 0170052532.
- Hughes, Aneurin (2005). Billy Hughes: Prime Minister and Controversial Founding Father of the Australian Labor Party. John Wiley & Sons. ISBN 9781740311366.
- Lloyd George, David (1938). The Truth about the Peace Treaties. V. Gollancz.
- Scott Ernest. Australia During The War (1936) online; extensive coverage of Hughes
- Spartalis, Peter (1983). The Diplomatic Battles of Billy Hughes. Hale & Iremonger. ISBN 0868060852.
- Williams, Roy (2013). In God They Trust?: The Religious Beliefs of Australia's Prime Ministers, 1901–2013. Bible Society Australia. ISBN 9780647518557.

Parliament of New South Wales
New district	Member for Sydney-Lang; 1894–1901	Succeeded by John Joseph Power
Parliament of Australia
New division	Member for West Sydney; 1901–1917	Succeeded by Con Wallace
Preceded by Alfred Hampson	Member for Bendigo; 1917–1922	Succeeded by Geoffry Hurry
Preceded by Granville Ryrie	Member for North Sydney; 1922–1949	Succeeded by William Jack
New division	Member for Bradfield; 1949–1952	Succeeded by Harry Turner
New title Original member	Father of the House of Representatives; 1935–1952	Succeeded by Sir Earle Page
New title Original member	Father of the Parliament; 1938–1952	Succeeded by Sir Earle Page
Political offices
Preceded by Alfred Deakin	Minister for External Affairs; 1904	Succeeded by George Reid
Preceded by Isaac Isaacs	Attorney-General of Australia; 1908–1909	Succeeded by Paddy Glynn
Preceded by Paddy Glynn	Attorney-General of Australia; 1910–1913	Succeeded by William Irvine
Preceded by William Irvine	Attorney-General of Australia; 1914–1921	Succeeded by Littleton Groom
Preceded by Andrew Fisher	Prime Minister of Australia; 1915–1923	Succeeded by Stanley Bruce
Preceded by Frank Tudor	Minister for Trade and Customs; 1916	Succeeded by William Archibald
New title	Minister for External Affairs; 1921–1923	Succeeded by Stanley Bruce
Preceded by Charles Marr	Minister for Health; 1934–1935	Succeeded by Joseph Lyons
Preceded by Charles Marr	Minister for Repatriation; 1934–1935	Succeeded by Joseph Lyons
Preceded by Alexander McLachlan	Vice-President of the Executive Council; 1934–1935	Succeeded by Joseph Lyons
Preceded by Joseph Lyons	Minister for Health; 1936–1937	Succeeded by Earle Page
Preceded by Joseph Lyons	Minister for Repatriation; 1936–1937	Succeeded by Harry Foll
Preceded by George Pearce	Minister for External Affairs; 1937–1939	Succeeded by Henry Gullett
Preceded by George Pearce	Minister in charge of Territories; 1937–1938	Succeeded by John Perkins
Preceded by Joseph Lyons	Vice-President of the Executive Council; 1937–1938	Succeeded by George McLeay
Preceded by Robert Menzies	Attorney-General of Australia; 1938–1941	Succeeded by H. V. Evatt
Preceded by Robert Menzies	Minister for Industry; 1939–1940	Title abolished
Preceded by Archie Cameron	Minister for the Navy; 1940–1941	Succeeded by Norman Makin
Party political offices
Preceded by Gregor McGregor	Deputy Leader of the Australian Labor Party; 1914–1915	Succeeded by George Pearce
Preceded by Andrew Fisher	Leader of the Australian Labor Party; 1915–1916	Succeeded by Frank Tudor
New political party	Leader of the National Labor Party; 1916–1917	Party disbanded
New political party	Leader of the Nationalist Party; 1917–1923	Succeeded by Stanley Bruce
New political party	Leader of the Australian Party; 1930–1931	Party disbanded
Preceded by Robert Menzies	Leader of the United Australia Party; 1941–1943	Succeeded by Robert Menzies
