= Electoral results for the district of Blayney =

Election results for Blayney, New South Wales, Australia

Blayney, an electoral district of the Legislative Assembly in the Australian state of New South Wales was created in 1904 and abolished in 1913.

Election	Member	Party
1904	Paddy Crick	Progressive
1907 by	John Withington	Liberal Reform
1907	George Beeby	Labor
1910	George Beeby	Labor
1913 by	George Beeby	Independent

== Election results ==
=== Elections in the 1910s ===
==== 1913 by-election ====
1913 Blayney by-election Friday 3 January
Party	Candidate	Votes	%	±%
Liberal Reform	John Withington	1,800	44.2	−0.8
Independent	George Beeby	1,156	28.4	
Labour	Valentine Johnston	1,120	27.5	−28.5
Total formal votes		4,077	100.0	+1.2
Informal votes		0	0.0	−1.2
Turnout		4,077	56.6 (Note: estimate based on an electoral roll of 7,207 at the 1910 election.)	−14.9

A second ballot was necessary because no candidate had won an absolute majority.

1913 Blayney by-election - Second Round Thursday 23 January
Party	Candidate	Votes	%	±%
Independent	George Beeby	2,244	51.6	
Liberal Reform	John Withington	2,108	48.4	+3.4
Total formal votes		4,356	99.0	+0.2
Informal votes		43	1.0	−0.2
Turnout		4,399	61.0	−10.5
Member changed to Independent from Labour		Swing	N/A	

George Beeby (Labour) resigned from the ministry, parliament and party in protest at the power of the extra-parliamentary Labor Party executive.

==== 1910 ====
1910 New South Wales state election: Blayney
Party	Candidate	Votes	%	±%
Labour	George Beeby	7,799	55.0	
Liberal Reform	William Kelk	2,292	45.0	
Total formal votes		5,091	98.8	
Informal votes		61	1.2	
Turnout		5,152	71.5	
Labour hold				

=== Elections in the 1900s ===
==== 1907 ====
1907 New South Wales state election: Blayney
Party	Candidate	Votes	%	±%
Labour	George Beeby	2,580	50.5	
Liberal Reform	John Withington (defeated)	2,530	49.5	
Total formal votes		5,110	97.4	
Informal votes		135	2.6	
Turnout		5,245	71.7	
Labour gain from Progressive				

Paddy Crick, Progressive Party, had won the seat at the 1904 election, however he was expelled from the Parliament in 1906. John Withington won the seat for the Liberal Reform Party at the 1907 by-election.

==== 1907 by-election ====
1907 Blayney by-election Saturday 12 January
Party	Candidate	Votes	%	±%
Liberal Reform	John Withington	1,733	50.3	
Labor	George Beeby	1,710	49.7	
Total formal votes		3,443	100.0	+0.7
Informal votes		0	0.0	−0.7
Turnout		3,443	50.6	−15.5
Liberal Reform gain from Progressive				

Paddy Crick (Progressive) was expelled from the Parliament for corruption.

==== 1904 ====
1904 New South Wales state election: Blayney
Party	Candidate	Votes	%	±%
Progressive	Paddy Crick	2,406	52.2	
Liberal Reform	Charles Garland	2,207	47.8	
Total formal votes		4,613	99.3	
Informal votes		35	0.8	
Turnout		4,648	66.1	
Progressive win		(new seat)		

Blayney was a new seat consisting of parts of Hartley, The Macquarie and the abolished seat of West Macquarie. Paddy Crick was the member for West Macquarie. The member for Hartley was John Hurley (Independent) who successfully contested that seat while his brother William (Progressive) was the member for The Macquarie who was appointed to the Legislative Council.
