= Candidates of the 1907 New South Wales state election =

The 1907 New South Wales state election involved 90 electoral districts returning one member each and was held on 10 September 1907.

Since the previous election in 1904, the Progressive Party, formerly one of the three major New South Wales political parties, had faded away. Some of its members had joined the Liberal Party, while others continued as independents. In line with general practice, those members are here given the designation "Former Progressive". Electorates previously held by the Progressive Party are marked as such.

== Retiring members ==
=== Liberal ===
- Rowland Anderson MLA (Botany)
- James Ashton MLA (Goulburn)
- William Dick MLA (Newcastle)
- Sydney Kearney MLA (Armidale)
- Broughton O'Conor MLA (Sherbrooke)
- Edwin Richards MLA (Mudgee)

=== Independent ===
- George Reynoldson MLA (Deniliquin)

== Legislative Assembly ==
Sitting members are shown in bold text. Successful candidates are highlighted in the relevant colour.

Electorate	Held by	Labor candidate	Liberal candidate	Other candidates
Albury	Progressive	Henry Davies		**Gordon McLaurin** (Fmr Prog)
Alexandria	Labor	**John Dacey**	**Albert Bruntnell** (Note: Albert Bruntnell (Liberal Reform) was the member for Surry Hills, having won the 1906 by-election, however he chose to contest Alexandria at the 1907 general election.)	Alexander Bryson (Ind); Patrick Craddock (Ind); Joseph Warner (Ind)
Allowrie	Liberal		**Mark Morton**	
Annandale	Liberal		**William Mahony**	Reginald Cohen (Ind)
Armidale	Liberal	Michael MacMahon	Edmund Lonsdale	
Ashburnham	Liberal	John Lynch	**Eden George**	
Ashfield	Liberal		**William Robson**	James Eve (Ind)
Balmain	Liberal	John Storey	**Walter Anderson**	
Bathurst	Progressive		John Miller	**William Young** (Fmr Prog)
Bega	Liberal	George Holt	**William Wood**	
Belmore	Progressive		Richard Teece	**Edward O'Sullivan** (Fmr Prog)
Belubula	Liberal	George Ross	**Thomas Waddell**	
Bingara	Liberal	Samuel Heaton	**Samuel Moore**	
Blayney	Liberal	George Beeby	**John Withington**	
Botany	Liberal	Fred Page	Isaac Spackman	William Cox (Ind)
Broken Hill	Labor	**John Cann**		
Burrangong	Labor	**George Burgess**	Hector McWilliam	
Burwood	Liberal	Thomas Tytherleigh	**Thomas Henley**	William Archer (Ind); Stapleton Rodd (Ind)
Camden	Liberal		**Fred Downes**	John Moore (Ind); Frederick Webster (Ind)
Camperdown	Progressive	Robert Stuart-Robertson	William Clegg	**James Smith** (Fmr Prog)
Canterbury	Liberal	Edgar Cutler	**Thomas Mackenzie**	Varney Parkes (Ind Lib)
Castlereagh	Labor	**John Treflé**		Donald Fletcher (Ind Lib)
Clarence	Progressive		**John McFarlane**	Thomas Willan (Ind)
Clyde	Liberal	William Alley	**William Millard**	John Keenan (Ind)
Cobar	Labor	**Donald Macdonell**		
Cootamundra	Labor	**William Holman**		Alfred Conroy (Ind Lib)
Corowa	Liberal	John Grant	**Richard Ball**	
Darling	Labor	**John Meehan**	William Davis	
Darling Harbour	Labor	**William Daley**	George Whatmore	John Norton (Ind)
Darling Harbour	Labor	**William Daley**	George Whatmore	Sydney Green (Ind); Harry Holland (Soc); Evan Jones (Ind)
Darlinghurst	Liberal	Donald McKinnon	**Daniel Levy**	James Jones (Ind); David Middleton (Ind)
Deniliquin	Independent	Henry Peters	Hugh McKinney	George Perrin (Ind); James Wallace (Ind)
Durham	Progressive			William Brown (Ind Lib)
Durham	Progressive			**Walter Bennett** (Fmr Prog)
Glebe	Liberal		**James Hogue**	John Haynes (Ind)
Gloucester	Liberal		**James Young**	Richard Price (Ind)
Gloucester	Liberal		**James Young**	Henry Gardem (Ind)
Gordon	Liberal	Sydney Hutton	**Charles Wade**	
Gough	Liberal	Francis Bryant	**Follett Thomas**	William Vincent (Ind)
Goulburn	Liberal	Richard Holloway	Augustus James	James Gegg (Ind); Thomas Rose (Ind)
Granville	Liberal	Walter Duncan	**John Nobbs**	
Gwydir	Labor	**George Jones**		Thomas Hogan (Ind Lib)
Hartley	Liberal	James Dooley	**John Hurley**	
Hastings and Macleay	Liberal		**Robert Davidson**	William Newton (Ind); Edward Noonan (Ind)
Hawkesbury	Progressive	Arthur Mackenzie	**Brinsley Hall**	Thomas Smith (Ind)
Kahibah	Labor	**Alfred Edden**		
King	Liberal	John West	**Ernest Broughton**	
Lachlan	Labor	**Andrew Kelly**	James Carroll	
Lane Cove	Liberal	Robert Boxall	**David Fell**	
Leichhardt	Liberal	Campbell Carmichael	**Robert Booth**	John Hawthorne (Ind)
Liverpool Plains	Ind Liberal	Henry Horne	**John Perry**	
Macquarie	Labor	**Thomas Thrower**	Charles Barton	
Maitland	Progressive	Samuel Rees	**John Gillies**	
Marrickville	Liberal	Walter Thompson	**Richard McCoy**	
Middle Harbour	Liberal		**Richard Arthur**	William Fell (Ind Lib); John Hayes (Ind); Thomas Loxton (Ind)
Monaro	Labor	**Gus Miller**	Edward Harris	
Mudgee	Progressive	James Morrish	Robert Jones	William Wall (Ind)
Murray	Labor	**Robert Scobie**	Frank Byrne	
Murrumbidgee	Labor	**Patrick McGarry**	Thomas Fitzpatrick	
Namoi	Ind Liberal	William Walton		**Albert Collins** (Ind Lib)
Newcastle	Liberal	Laurence Vial	Owen Gilbert	
Newtown	Labor	**Robert Hollis**	Harold Morgan	Patrick Quinn (Ind)
Northumberland	Labor	**Matthew Charlton**	John Sutton	
Orange	Labor	**Albert Gardiner**	John Fitzpatrick	
Paddington	Liberal	John Osborne	**Charles Oakes**	Sidney Baird (Ind)
Parramatta	Liberal	Arthur Rae	**Tom Moxham**	Edward Terry (Ind)
Petersham	Liberal	John Kohen	**John Cohen**	William Pickup (Ind)
Phillip	Labor	**Phillip Sullivan**	John Garland	Richard Meagher (Ind)
Pyrmont	Labor	**John McNeill**	Percy Stevens	
Queanbeyan	Liberal	George Clark	**Granville Ryrie**	Edward Lockwood (Ind)
Raleigh	Progressive	William McCristal		**George Briner** (Fmr Prog)
Raleigh	Progressive	William McCristal		John McLaughlin (Ind Lib)
Randwick	Liberal	John Browne	**David Storey**	
Redfern	Labor	**James McGowen**	George Howe	
Richmond	Progressive		**John Perry**	Thomas Temperley (Ind)
Rous	Liberal		**George Hindmarsh**	Richard Balmer (Ind); John Sheridan (Ind)
Rozelle	Liberal	James Mercer	**Sydney Law**	
St George	Liberal	George Black	**Sir Joseph Carruthers**	
St Leonards	Liberal	Herbert Milner	John Carter	Edward Clark (Ind)
St Leonards	Liberal	Herbert Milner	John Carter	**Thomas Creswell** (Ind Lib); Herbert McIntosh (Ind Lib)
Sherbrooke	Liberal	Benjamin Prior	John Hunt	Donald Campbell (Ind); Robert Lalor (Ind); Eugene Rudder (Ind)
Singleton	Liberal	William Johnson	**James Fallick**	
Sturt	Labor	**Arthur Griffith**		
Surry Hills	Liberal	John Birt	Sir James Graham	Paddy Crick (Ind); George Perry (Ind)
Tamworth	Progressive	Harold Farleigh		**Robert Levien** (Fmr Prog)
Tamworth	Progressive	Harold Farleigh		Samuel Walker (Ind)
Tenterfield	Liberal		**Charles Lee**	Robert Pyers (Ind)
Upper Hunter	Liberal	William Ashford	**William Fleming**	Edward Eagar (Ind); Wilfred Young (Ind)
Waratah	Labor	**John Estell**		David Renfrew (Ind)
Waverley	Liberal	Edward Whittington	**Thomas Jessep**	James Macarthur-Onslow (Ind Lib)
Waverley	Liberal	Edward Whittington	**Thomas Jessep**	Frank Lock (Ind)
Wickham	Progressive	William Grahame		**John Fegan** (Fmr Prog)
Wollondilly	Liberal	Laurence Gilmartin	**William McCourt**	Leonard Green (Ind)
Wollongong	Labor	**John Nicholson**	Alexander Campbell	
Woollahra	Liberal	Robert Usher	**William Latimer**	
Wynyard	Progressive	Patrick Sullivan		**Robert Donaldson** (Fmr Prog)
Yass	Labor	**Niels Nielsen**	Bernard Grogan	

== See also ==
- Results of the 1907 New South Wales state election
- Members of the New South Wales Legislative Assembly, 1907–1910
