= Results of the 1907 New South Wales state election =

State election for New South Wales, Australia in September 1907

New South Wales state election, 10 September 1907 Legislative Assembly << 1904–1910 >>
Enrolled voters	745,900				
Votes cast	458,408		Turnout	66.72	+7.41
Informal votes	13,543		Informal	2.87	+1.88
Summary of votes by party
Party	Primary votes	%	Swing	Seats	Change
Liberal Reform	210,456	45.91	+1.33	45	0
Labour	152,704	33.31	+10.01	32	+7
Independent	46,551	10.15	+3.69	4	+2
Independent Liberal	26,192	5.71	+0.37	4	+2
Former Progressive	21,759	4.75	−14.23	5	−11
Socialist	746	0.16	+0.10	0	0
Total	458,408			90	

The 1907 New South Wales state election involved 90 electoral districts returning one member each. The election was conducted on the basis of a simple majority or first-past-the-post voting system.

In this election, 7 members did not stand for re-election, (Note: Liberal Reform Party members Rowland Anderson (Botany) James Ashton (Goulburn), William Dick (Newcastle) Sydney Kearney (Armidale) Broughton O'Conor (Sherbrooke) Edwin Richards (Mudgee) and independent George Reynoldson (Deniliquin).) in 11 electorates the winning candidate received less than 50% of the votes, (Note: Canterbury, Darling Harbour, Deniliquin, Goulburn, Hastings and Macleay, Leichhardt, Phillip, St Leonards, Surry Hills, Upper Hunter and Waverley.) while 5 were uncontested. (Note: Allowrie, Broken Hill, Cobar, Kahibah and Sturt.)

There were 23 seats that elected a member from a different party, while a further 5 seats where the member retained the seat but changed from the Progressive Party to the Liberal Reform Party, continuing the demise of the Progressive Party, from a high of 42 seats at the 1901 election. Four months before the election the party had negotiated a coalition agreement with the Liberal Reform Party however this was rejected by a vote of parliamentary members. The party leader Thomas Waddell (Belubula) resigned and joined the Liberal Reform Party, and was followed by John McFarlane (The Clarence), Brinsley Hall (The Hawkesbury), John Gillies (Maitland) and John Perry (b 1845) (The Richmond). Of the remaining 10 former Progressive Party members, a further 5 lost their seats. For a comprehensive list, see 1907 New South Wales state election § Changing seats.

== Election results ==
=== Albury ===
1907 New South Wales state election: Albury
Party	Candidate	Votes	%	±%
Former Progressive	Gordon McLaurin	2,452	61.5	
Labour	Henry Davies	1,533	38.5	
Total formal votes		3,985	96.4	
Informal votes		150	3.6	
Turnout		4,135	60.9	
Former Progressive hold				

=== Alexandria ===
1907 New South Wales state election: Alexandria
Party	Candidate	Votes	%	±%
Labour	John Dacey	3,523	55.0	
Liberal Reform	Albert Bruntnell	2,742	42.8	
Independent	Joseph Edward Warner	119	1.9	
Independent	Patrick Joseph Craddock	10	0.2	
Independent	Alexander Bryson	8	0.1	
Total formal votes		6,290	97.7	
Informal votes		147	2.3	
Turnout		6,437	71.7	
Labour hold				

=== Allowrie ===
1907 New South Wales state election: Allowrie
Party	Candidate	Votes	%	±%
Liberal Reform	Mark Morton	Unopposed		
Liberal Reform hold				

=== Annandale ===
1907 New South Wales state election: Annandale
Party	Candidate	Votes	%	±%
Liberal Reform	William Mahony	3,567	54.9	
Independent	Isaiah Cohen	2,933	45.1	
Total formal votes		6,500	97.0	
Informal votes		200	3.0	
Turnout		6,700	69.2	
Liberal Reform hold				

=== Armidale ===
1907 New South Wales state election: Armidale
Party	Candidate	Votes	%	±%
Liberal Reform	Edmund Lonsdale	2,964	52.0	
Labour	Michael MacMahon	2,741	48.1	
Total formal votes		5,705	97.3	
Informal votes		158	2.7	
Turnout		5,863	68.4	
Liberal Reform hold				

=== Ashburnham ===
1907 New South Wales state election: Ashburnham
Party	Candidate	Votes	%	±%
Labour	John Lynch	2,972	53.7	+22.3
Liberal Reform	Eden George	2,560	46.3	+10.9
Total formal votes		5,532	96.0	
Informal votes		231	4.0	
Turnout		5,763	74.0	
Labour gain from Liberal Reform		Swing	+5.7	

=== Ashfield ===
1907 New South Wales state election: Ashfield
Party	Candidate	Votes	%	±%
Liberal Reform	William Robson	4,267	67.6	
Independent	James Eve	2,047	32.4	
Total formal votes		6,314	97.9	
Informal votes		136	2.1	
Turnout		6,450	66.7	
Liberal Reform hold				

=== Balmain ===
1907 New South Wales state election: Balmain
Party	Candidate	Votes	%	±%
Labour	John Storey	3,100	50.3	+2.8
Liberal Reform	Walter Anderson	3,058	49.7	−2.8
Total formal votes		6,158	98.8	
Informal votes		72	1.2	
Turnout		6,230	76.3	
Labour gain from Liberal Reform		Swing	+2.8	

=== Bathurst ===
1907 New South Wales state election: Bathurst
Party	Candidate	Votes	%	±%
Liberal Reform	John Miller	2,613	52.4	+6.5
Former Progressive	William Young	2,372	47.6	−6.5
Total formal votes		4,985	96.3	
Informal votes		193	3.7	
Turnout		5,178	73.4	
Liberal Reform gain from Progressive		Swing	+6.5	

=== Bega ===
1907 New South Wales state election: Bega
Party	Candidate	Votes	%	±%
Liberal Reform	William Wood	3,024	55.5	
Labour	George Holt	2,423	44.5	
Total formal votes		5,447	98.7	
Informal votes		74	1.3	
Turnout		5,521	74.8	
Liberal Reform hold				

=== Belmore ===
1907 New South Wales state election: Belmore
Party	Candidate	Votes	%	±%
Former Progressive	Edward O'Sullivan	3,441	69.7	
Liberal Reform	Richard Teece	1,494	30.3	
Total formal votes		4,935	98.3	
Informal votes		87	1.7	
Turnout		5,022	62.3	
Former Progressive hold				

=== Belubula ===
1907 New South Wales state election: Belubula
Party	Candidate	Votes	%	±%
Liberal Reform	Thomas Waddell	2,789	54.6	−2.6
Labour	George Ross	2,321	45.4	
Total formal votes		5,110	95.8	
Informal votes		222	4.2	
Turnout		5,332	67.9	
Member changed to Liberal Reform from Progressive		Swing	−2.6	

=== Bingara ===
1907 New South Wales state election: Bingara
Party	Candidate	Votes	%	±%
Liberal Reform	Samuel Moore	3,143	61.9	
Labour	Samuel Heaton	1,936	38.1	
Total formal votes		5,079	96.9	
Informal votes		161	3.1	
Turnout		5,240	59.8	
Liberal Reform hold				

=== Blayney ===
1907 New South Wales state election: Blayney
Party	Candidate	Votes	%	±%
Labour	George Beeby	2,580	50.5	
Liberal Reform	John Withington (defeated)	2,530	49.5	
Total formal votes		5,110	97.4	
Informal votes		135	2.6	
Turnout		5,245	71.7	
Labour gain from Progressive				

Paddy Crick, Progressive Party, had won the seat at the 1904 election, however he was expelled from the Parliament in 1906. John Withington won the seat for the Liberal Reform Party at the 1907 by-election.

=== Botany ===
1907 New South Wales state election: Botany
Party	Candidate	Votes	%	±%
Labour	Fred Page	3,420	53.2	+14.3
Liberal Reform	Isaac Spackman	2,958	46.0	+5.9
Independent	William Cox	55	0.9	
Total formal votes		6,433	96.8	
Informal votes		212	3.2	
Turnout		6,645	72.2	
Labour gain from Liberal Reform		Swing	+4.2	

=== Broken Hill ===
1907 New South Wales state election: Broken Hill
Party	Candidate	Votes	%	±%
Labour	John Cann	Unopposed		
Labour hold				

=== Burrangong ===
1907 New South Wales state election: Burrangong
Party	Candidate	Votes	%	±%
Labour	George Burgess	3,086	52.7	
Liberal Reform	Hector McWilliam	2,771	47.3	
Total formal votes		5,857	97.9	
Informal votes		124	2.1	
Turnout		5,981	72.8	
Labour hold				

=== Burwood ===
1907 New South Wales state election: Burwood
Party	Candidate	Votes	%	±%
Liberal Reform	Thomas Henley	3,948	55.2	
Labour	Thomas Tytherleigh	1,503	21.0	
Independent	William Archer	1,103	15.4	
Independent	Stapleton Rodd	600	8.4	
Total formal votes		7,154	97.3	
Informal votes		197	2.7	
Turnout		7,351	74.4	
Liberal Reform hold				

=== Camden ===
1907 New South Wales state election: Camden
Party	Candidate	Votes	%	±%
Liberal Reform	Fred Downes	2,671	57.9	
Independent	John Moore	1,867	40.5	
Independent	Frederick Webster	74	1.6	
Total formal votes		4,612	97.0	
Informal votes		142	3.0	
Turnout		4,754	63.7	
Liberal Reform hold				

=== Camperdown ===
1907 New South Wales state election: Camperdown
Party	Candidate	Votes	%	±%
Labour	Robert Stuart-Robertson	3,377	51.7	
Liberal Reform	William Clegg	2,860	43.8	+15.5
Former Progressive	James Smith (defeated)	294	4.5	
Total formal votes		6,531	98.2	
Informal votes		123	1.9	
Turnout		6,654	73.1	
Labour gain from Progressive				

=== Canterbury ===
1907 New South Wales state election: Canterbury
Party	Candidate	Votes	%	±%
Independent Liberal	Varney Parkes	3,531	43.0	
Liberal Reform	Thomas Mackenzie	2,419	29.5	−27.4
Labour	Edgar Cutler	2,257	27.5	+2.8
Total formal votes		8,207	97.1	
Informal votes		246	2.9	
Turnout		8,453	73.7	
Independent Liberal gain from Liberal Reform				

=== The Castlereagh ===
1907 New South Wales state election: The Castlereagh
Party	Candidate	Votes	%	±%
Labour	John Treflé	2,854	56.6	
Independent Liberal	Donald Fletcher	2,186	43.4	
Total formal votes		5,040	96.5	
Informal votes		181	3.5	
Turnout		5,221	65.4	
Labour hold				

=== The Clarence ===
1907 New South Wales state election: The Clarence
Party	Candidate	Votes	%	±%
Liberal Reform	John McFarlane	2,305	73.0	
Independent	Thomas Willan	852	27.0	
Total formal votes		3,157	96.4	
Informal votes		117	3.6	
Turnout		3,274	46.0	
Member changed to Liberal Reform from Progressive				

=== The Clyde ===
1907 New South Wales state election: The Clyde
Party	Candidate	Votes	%	±%
Liberal Reform	William Millard	1,902	53.6	
Independent	John Keenan	834	23.5	
Labour	William Alley	815	23.0	
Total formal votes		3,551	96.2	
Informal votes		141	3.8	
Turnout		3,692	69.6	
Liberal Reform hold				

=== Cobar ===
1907 New South Wales state election: Cobar
Party	Candidate	Votes	%	±%
Labour	Donald Macdonell	Unopposed		
Labour hold				

=== Cootamundra ===
1907 New South Wales state election: Cootamundra
Party	Candidate	Votes	%	±%
Labour	William Holman	3,005	52.4	
Independent Liberal	Alfred Conroy	2,730	47.6	
Total formal votes		5,735	97.8	
Informal votes		129	2.2	
Turnout		5,864	72.3	
Labour hold				

=== Corowa ===
1907 New South Wales state election: Corowa
Party	Candidate	Votes	%	±%
Liberal Reform	Richard Ball	2,568	56.0	
Labour	John Grant	2,015	44.0	
Total formal votes		4,583	97.5	
Informal votes		120	2.6	
Turnout		4,703	61.2	
Liberal Reform hold				

=== The Darling ===
1907 New South Wales state election: The Darling
Party	Candidate	Votes	%	±%
Labour	John Meehan	2,370	67.0	
Liberal Reform	William Davis	1,170	33.1	
Total formal votes		4,583	97.5	
Informal votes		120	2.6	
Turnout		4,703	61.2	
Labour hold				

=== Darling Harbour ===
1907 New South Wales state election: Darling Harbour
Party	Candidate	Votes	%	±%
Independent	John Norton	1,666	35.8	
Labour	William Daley	1,146	24.7	
International Socialist	Harry Holland	746	16.1	
Liberal Reform	George Whatmore	650	14.0	
Independent	Evan Jones	435	9.4	
Independent	Sydney Green	6	0.1	
Total formal votes		4,649	96.7	
Informal votes		161	3.3	
Turnout		4,810	66.9	
Independent gain from Labour (Note: John Norton was backed by breakaway local Labour Leagues who objected to the endorsement of William Daley.)				

=== Darlinghurst ===
1907 New South Wales state election: Darlinghurst
Party	Candidate	Votes	%	±%
Liberal Reform	Daniel Levy	2,640	57.7	
Labour	Donald McKinnon	1,263	27.6	
Independent	David Middleton	661	14.4	
Total formal votes		4,579	97.5	
Informal votes		116	2.5	
Turnout		4,695	56.9	
Liberal Reform hold				

=== Deniliquin ===
1907 New South Wales state election: Deniliquin
Party	Candidate	Votes	%	±%
Labour	Henry Peters	1,958	48.1	
Liberal Reform	Hugh McKinney	1,536	37.7	
Independent	James Wallace	333	8.2	
Independent	George Perrin	246	6.0	
Total formal votes		4,073	97.6	
Informal votes		99	2.4	
Turnout		4,172	62.5	
Labour gain from Independent				

=== Durham ===
1907 New South Wales state election: Durham
Party	Candidate	Votes	%	±%
Independent Liberal	William Brown	2,221	50.6	
Former Progressive	Walter Bennett (defeated)	2,166	49.4	
Total formal votes		4,387	97.6	
Informal votes		108	2.4	
Turnout		4,495	68.5	
Independent Liberal gain from Progressive (Note: William Brown had the support of some local Liberal Reform branches but was not endorsed by the central executive. The Sydney Morning Herald said both candidates were generally favourable to the Government policy.)				

=== The Glebe ===
1907 New South Wales state election: The Glebe
Party	Candidate	Votes	%	±%
Liberal Reform	James Hogue	3,240	53.9	
Independent	John Haynes	2,774	46.1	
Total formal votes		6,014	97.0	
Informal votes		187	3.0	
Turnout		6,201	66.5	
Liberal Reform hold				

=== Gloucester ===
1907 New South Wales state election: Gloucester
Party	Candidate	Votes	%	±%
Independent	Richard Price	2,854	52.7	
Liberal Reform	James Young	2,407	44.4	
Independent	Henry Gardem	160	3.0	
Total formal votes		5,421	97.1	
Informal votes		160	2.9	
Turnout		5,581	73.0	
Independent gain from Liberal Reform (Note: Richard Price had put his name forward as a Liberal candidate, however James Young was endorsed by the central executive.)				

=== Gordon ===
1907 New South Wales state election: Gordon
Party	Candidate	Votes	%	±%
Liberal Reform	Charles Wade	5,156	73.6	
Labour	Sydney Hutton	1,854	26.5	
Total formal votes		7,010	97.2	
Informal votes		203	2.8	
Turnout		7,213	74.1	
Liberal Reform hold				

=== Gough ===
1907 New South Wales state election: Gough
Party	Candidate	Votes	%	±%
Liberal Reform	Follett Thomas	2,982	55.6	
Labour	Francis Bryant	2,166	40.4	
Independent	William Vincent	217	4.0	
Total formal votes		5,365	96.4	
Informal votes		203	3.7	
Turnout		5,568	67.2	
Liberal Reform hold				

=== Goulburn ===
1907 New South Wales state election: Goulburn
Party	Candidate	Votes	%	±%
Liberal Reform	Augustus James	2,237	42.5	
Labour	Richard Holloway	1,553	29.5	
Independent	Thomas Rose	1,267	24.1	
Independent	James Gegg	208	4.0	
Total formal votes		5,265	98.4	
Informal votes		84	1.6	
Turnout		5,349	67.9	
Liberal Reform hold				

=== Granville ===
1907 New South Wales state election: Granville
Party	Candidate	Votes	%	±%
Liberal Reform	John Nobbs	3,600	72.5	
Labour	Walter Duncan	1,363	27.5	
Total formal votes		4,963	96.5	
Informal votes		179	3.5	
Turnout		5,142	58.5	
Liberal Reform hold				

=== The Gwydir ===
1907 New South Wales state election: The Gwydir
Party	Candidate	Votes	%	±%
Labour	George Jones	2,302	60.6	
Independent Liberal	Thomas Hogan	1,495	39.4	
Total formal votes		3,797	95.7	
Informal votes		169	4.3	
Turnout		3,966	54.8	
Labour hold				

=== Hartley ===
1907 New South Wales state election: Hartley
Party	Candidate	Votes	%	±%
Labour	James Dooley	2,967	50.2	
Liberal Reform	John Hurley	2,947	49.8	
Total formal votes		5,914	96.1	
Informal votes		241	3.9	
Turnout		6,155	59.9	
Labour gain from Liberal Reform				

=== Hastings and Macleay ===
1907 New South Wales state election: Hastings and Macleay
Party	Candidate	Votes	%	±%
Liberal Reform	Robert Davidson	2,334	49.4	
Independent	Edward Noonan	2,002	42.4	
Independent	William Newton	387	8.2	
Total formal votes		4,723	96.8	
Informal votes		156	3.2	
Turnout		4,879	66.6	
Liberal Reform hold				

=== The Hawkesbury ===
1907 New South Wales state election: The Hawkesbury
Party	Candidate	Votes	%	±%
Liberal Reform	Brinsley Hall	3,571	65.6	
Independent	Thomas Smith	1,673	30.7	
Labour	Arthur Mackenzie	200	3.7	
Total formal votes		5,444	97.0	
Informal votes		169	3.0	
Turnout		5,613	68.0	
Member changed to Liberal Reform from Progressive				

=== Kahibah ===
1907 New South Wales state election: Kahibah
Party	Candidate	Votes	%	±%
Labour	Alfred Edden	Unopposed		
Labour hold				

=== King ===
1907 New South Wales state election: King
Party	Candidate	Votes	%	±%
Liberal Reform	Ernest Broughton	2,461	51.4	
Labour	John West	2,331	48.6	
Total formal votes		4,792	97.6	
Informal votes		120	2.4	
Turnout		4,912	62.5	
Liberal Reform hold				

=== The Lachlan ===
1907 New South Wales state election: The Lachlan
Party	Candidate	Votes	%	±%
Labour	Andrew Kelly	2,726	53.1	
Liberal Reform	James Carroll	2,409	46.9	
Total formal votes		5,135	97.1	
Informal votes		153	2.9	
Turnout		5,288	67.4	
Labour hold				

=== Lane Cove ===
1907 New South Wales state election: Lane Cove
Party	Candidate	Votes	%	±%
Liberal Reform	David Fell	4,380	72.4	
Labour	Robert Boxall	1,673	27.6	
Total formal votes		6,053	96.6	
Informal votes		212	3.4	
Turnout		6,265	60.6	
Liberal Reform hold				

=== Leichhardt ===
1907 New South Wales state election: Leichhardt
Party	Candidate	Votes	%	±%
Labour	Campbell Carmichael	3,554	44.2	
Liberal Reform	Robert Booth	3,069	38.1	
Independent Liberal	John Hawthorne	1,425	17.7	
Total formal votes		8,048	97.9	
Informal votes		176	2.1	
Turnout		8,224	79.6	
Labour gain from Liberal Reform				

=== Liverpool Plains ===
1907 New South Wales state election: Liverpool Plains
Party	Candidate	Votes	%	±%
Labour	Henry Horne	2,519	51.5	
Liberal Reform	John Perry (b 1849)	2,373	48.5	
Total formal votes		4,892	96.9	
Informal votes		155	3.1	
Turnout		5,047	66.1	
Labour gain from Independent Liberal				

SItting member John Perry (b 1849) had been elected as an Independent Liberal candidate at the 1904 election, and joined Liberal Reform in 1907.

=== The Macquarie ===
1907 New South Wales state election: The Macquarie
Party	Candidate	Votes	%	±%
Liberal Reform	Charles Barton	3,344	50.5	
Labour	Thomas Thrower	3,279	49.5	
Total formal votes		6,623	98.0	
Informal votes		136	2.0	
Turnout		6,759	73.2	
Liberal Reform gain from Labour				

=== Maitland ===
1907 New South Wales state election: Maitland
Party	Candidate	Votes	%	±%
Liberal Reform	John Gillies	3,563	82.7	
Labour	Samuel Rees	746	17.3	
Total formal votes		4,309	95.0	
Informal votes		229	5.1	
Turnout		4,538	59.1	
Member changed to Liberal Reform from Progressive				

=== Marrickville ===
1907 New South Wales state election: Marrickville
Party	Candidate	Votes	%	±%
Liberal Reform	Richard McCoy	3,966	64.6	
Labour	Walter Thompson	2,178	35.5	
Total formal votes		6,144	98.0	
Informal votes		128	2.0	
Turnout		6,272	66.7	
Liberal Reform hold				

=== Middle Harbour ===
1907 New South Wales state election: Middle Harbour
Party	Candidate	Votes	%	±%
Liberal Reform	Richard Arthur	5,120	57.2	
Independent Liberal	William Fell	3,674	41.0	
Independent	Thomas Loxton	92	1.0	
Independent	John Hayes	70	0.8	
Total formal votes		8,956	98.0	
Informal votes		183	2.0	
Turnout		9,139	75.9	
Liberal Reform hold				

=== Monaro ===
1907 New South Wales state election: Monaro
Party	Candidate	Votes	%	±%
Labour	Gus Miller	1,847	67.5	
Liberal Reform	Edward Harris	888	32.5	
Total formal votes		2,735	94.5	
Informal votes		159	5.5	
Turnout		2,894	48.5	
Labour hold				

=== Mudgee ===
1907 New South Wales state election: Mudgee
Party	Candidate	Votes	%	±%
Liberal Reform	Robert Jones	3,045	53.7	
Labour	James Morrish	2,417	42.6	
Independent	William Wall	211	3.7	
Total formal votes		5,673	97.3	
Informal votes		156	2.7	
Turnout		5,829	73.2	
Liberal Reform gain from Progressive				

=== The Murray ===
1907 New South Wales state election: The Murray
Party	Candidate	Votes	%	±%
Labour	Robert Scobie	2,041	63.6	
Liberal Reform	Frank Byrne	1,168	36.4	
Total formal votes		3,209	96.8	
Informal votes		105	3.2	
Turnout		3,314	48.6	
Labour hold				

=== The Murrumbidgee ===
1907 New South Wales state election: The Murrumbidgee
Party	Candidate	Votes	%	±%
Labour	Patrick McGarry	3,931	55.6	
Liberal Reform	Thomas Fitzpatrick	3,140	44.4	
Total formal votes		7,071	98.0	
Informal votes		141	2.0	
Turnout		7,212	70.0	
Labour hold				

=== The Namoi ===
1907 New South Wales state election: The Namoi
Party	Candidate	Votes	%	±%
Independent Liberal	Albert Collins (Note: Albert Collins was supported by the Liberal Reform Party as having assisted in the work of the government and generally favourable to its policies.)	2,531	53.9	
Labour	William Walton	2,165	46.1	
Total formal votes		4,696	96.9	
Informal votes		149	3.1	
Turnout		4,845	65.9	
Independent Liberal hold				

=== Newcastle ===
1907 New South Wales state election: Newcastle
Party	Candidate	Votes	%	±%
Liberal Reform	Owen Gilbert	2,950	57.4	
Labour	Laurence Vial	2,186	42.6	
Total formal votes		5,136	96.9	
Informal votes		167	3.2	
Turnout		5,303	71.9	
Liberal Reform hold				

=== Newtown ===
1907 New South Wales state election: Newtown
Party	Candidate	Votes	%	±%
Labour	Robert Hollis	3,224	50.4	
Liberal Reform	Harold Morgan	3,150	49.3	
Independent	Patrick Quinn	20	0.3	
Total formal votes		6,394	97.6	
Informal votes		156	2.4	
Turnout		6,550	71.4	
Labour hold				

=== Northumberland ===
1907 New South Wales state election: Northumberland
Party	Candidate	Votes	%	±%
Labour	Matthew Charlton	3,749	69.2	
Liberal Reform	John Sutton	1,668	30.8	
Total formal votes		5,417	96.5	
Informal votes		197	3.5	
Turnout		5,614	45.8	
Labour hold				

=== Orange ===
1907 New South Wales state election: Orange
Party	Candidate	Votes	%	±%
Liberal Reform	John Fitzpatrick	3,030	52.2	
Labour	Albert Gardiner	2,775	47.8	
Total formal votes		5,805	98.2	
Informal votes		108	1.8	
Turnout		5,913	76.9	
Liberal Reform gain from Labour				

=== Paddington ===
1907 New South Wales state election: Paddington
Party	Candidate	Votes	%	±%
Liberal Reform	Charles Oakes	2,978	56.4	
Labour	John Osborne	2,290	43.3	
Independent	Sidney Baird	17	0.3	
Total formal votes		5,285	98.0	
Informal votes		110	2.0	
Turnout		5,395	57.6	
Liberal Reform hold				

=== Parramatta ===
1907 New South Wales state election: Parramatta
Party	Candidate	Votes	%	±%
Liberal Reform	Tom Moxham	2,920	51.8	
Independent	Edward Terry	1,509	26.4	
Labour	Arthur Rae	1,242	21.8	
Total formal votes		5,711	95.3	
Informal votes		285	4.7	
Turnout		5,996	74.5	
Liberal Reform hold				

=== Petersham ===
1907 New South Wales state election: Petersham
Party	Candidate	Votes	%	±%
Liberal Reform	John Cohen	4,398	79.2	
Labour	John Kohen	1,082	19.5	
Independent	William Pickup	73	1.3	
Total formal votes		5,553	98.4	
Informal votes		90	1.6	
Turnout		5,643	62.6	
Liberal Reform hold				

=== Phillip ===
1907 New South Wales state election: Phillip
Party	Candidate	Votes	%	±%
Independent	Richard Meagher	2,578	42.6	
Liberal Reform	John Garland	1,735	28.7	
Labour	Phillip Sullivan	1,735	28.7	
Total formal votes		6,048	97.3	
Informal votes		170	2.7	
Turnout		6,218	72.5	
Independent gain from Labour				

=== Pyrmont ===
1907 New South Wales state election: Pyrmont
Party	Candidate	Votes	%	±%
Labour	John McNeill	2,734	65.3	
Liberal Reform	Percy Stevens	1,454	34.7	
Total formal votes		4,188	95.5	
Informal votes		198	4.5	
Turnout		4,386	62.0	
Labour hold				

=== Queanbeyan ===
1907 New South Wales state election: Queanbeyan
Party	Candidate	Votes	%	±%
Liberal Reform	Granville Ryrie	2,447	55.7	
Labour	George Clark	1,941	44.1	
Independent	Edward Lockwood	9	0.2	
Total formal votes		4,397	97.4	
Informal votes		119	2.6	
Turnout		4,516	71.7	
Liberal Reform hold				

=== Raleigh ===
1907 New South Wales state election: Raleigh
Party	Candidate	Votes	%	±%
Former Progressive	George Briner	2,772	64.3	
Independent Liberal	John McLaughlin	1,172	27.2	
Labour	William McCristal	370	8.6	
Total formal votes		4,314	94.7	
Informal votes		244	5.4	
Turnout		4,558	55.9	
Former Progressive hold				

=== Randwick ===
1907 New South Wales state election: Randwick
Party	Candidate	Votes	%	±%
Liberal Reform	David Storey	3,499	76.0	
Labour	John Browne	1,104	24.0	
Total formal votes		4,603	96.5	
Informal votes		168	3.5	
Turnout		4,771	51.4	
Liberal Reform hold				

=== Redfern ===
1907 New South Wales state election: Redfern
Party	Candidate	Votes	%	±%
Labour	James McGowen	3,222	53.4	
Liberal Reform	George Howe	2,811	46.6	
Total formal votes		6,033	97.6	
Informal votes		149	2.4	
Turnout		6,182	71.5	
Labour hold				

=== The Richmond ===
1907 New South Wales state election: The Richmond
Party	Candidate	Votes	%	±%
Liberal Reform	John Perry (b 1845)	3,007	60.3	+22.3
Independent	Thomas Temperley	1,984	39.8	
Total formal votes		4,991	96.8	
Informal votes		163	3.2	
Turnout		5,154	69.3	
Member changed to Liberal Reform from Progressive		Swing	+22.3	

=== Rous ===
1907 New South Wales state election: Rous
Party	Candidate	Votes	%	±%
Liberal Reform	George Hindmarsh	3,454	52.3	
Independent	John Sheridan	2,020	30.6	
Independent	Richard Balmer	1,128	17.1	
Total formal votes		6,602	96.0	
Informal votes		277	4.0	
Turnout		6,879	68.5	
Liberal Reform hold				

=== Rozelle ===
1907 New South Wales state election: Rozelle
Party	Candidate	Votes	%	±%
Labour	James Mercer	3,471	53.2	+4.1
Liberal Reform	Sydney Law	3,056	46.8	−4.1
Total formal votes		6,527	97.9	
Informal votes		143	2.1	
Turnout		6,670	74.4	
Labour gain from Liberal Reform		Swing	+4.1	

=== St George ===
1907 New South Wales state election: St George
Party	Candidate	Votes	%	±%
Liberal Reform	Sir Joseph Carruthers	5,345	78.0	
Labour	George Black	1,507	22.0	
Total formal votes		6,852	96.9	
Informal votes		220	3.1	
Turnout		7,072	66.9	
Liberal Reform hold				

=== St Leonards ===
1907 New South Wales state election: St Leonards
Party	Candidate	Votes	%	±%
Independent	Edward Clark	2,366	37.0	−0.5
Liberal Reform	John Carter	1,972	30.8	−18.9
Independent Liberal	Herbert McIntosh	909	14.2	
Labour	Herbert Milner	600	9.4	−0.9
Independent Liberal	Thomas Creswell (defeated)	549	8.6	
Total formal votes		6,396	97.6	
Informal votes		156	2.4	
Turnout		6,552	71.9	
Independent gain from Liberal Reform		Swing	+9.2	

This was the third and final contest for St Leonards between Edward Clark and Thomas Creswell. Clark, as the selected Liberal Reform candidate defeated Cresswell at the 1901 election. Creswell then defeated Clark to be selected as the Liberal Reform candidate in 1904, before comfortably beating him at the election. Cresswell however lost Liberal preselection for the seat in 1907 to John Carter, with Clark defeating both Cresswell and Carter to regain the seat.

=== Sherbrooke ===
1907 New South Wales state election: Sherbrooke
Party	Candidate	Votes	%	±%
Liberal Reform	John Hunt	3,733	73.4	
Labour	Benjamin Prior	476	9.4	
Independent	Robert Lalor	440	8.7	
Independent	Eugene Rudder	417	8.2	
Independent	Donald Campbell	23	0.5	
Total formal votes		5,089	98.0	
Informal votes		102	2.0	
Turnout		5,191	64.1	
Liberal Reform hold				

=== Singleton ===
1907 New South Wales state election: Singleton
Party	Candidate	Votes	%	±%
Liberal Reform	James Fallick	2,243	58.1	
Labour	William Johnson	1,619	41.9	
Total formal votes		3,862	97.9	
Informal votes		85	2.2	
Turnout		3,947	64.6	
Liberal Reform hold				

=== Sturt ===
1907 New South Wales state election: Sturt
Party	Candidate	Votes	%	±%
Labour	Arthur Griffith	Unopposed		
Labour hold				

=== Surry Hills ===
1907 New South Wales state election: Surry Hills
Party	Candidate	Votes	%	±%
Liberal Reform	Sir James Graham	2,227	37.3	
Labour	John Birt	2,104	35.3	
Independent	Paddy Crick	1,442	24.2	
Independent	George Perry	194	3.3	
Total formal votes		5,967	96.3	
Informal votes		230	3.7	
Turnout		6,197	68.4	
Liberal Reform gain from Independent				

John Norton (Independent) had won the seat at the 1904 election, however he challenged William Holman to face a by-election and was soundly defeated at the Surry Hills by-election in July 1906, finishing fourth behind Albert Bruntnell (Liberal Reform). At the 1907 general election Bruntnell chose to contest Alexandria but the seat was retained for Liberal Reform by Sir James Graham.

=== Tamworth ===
1907 New South Wales state election: Tamworth
Party	Candidate	Votes	%	±%
Former Progressive	Robert Levien	2,783	60.0	
Independent	Samuel Walker	1,696	36.5	
Labour	Harold Farleigh (Note: The Worker listed Harold Farleigh as a Labour candidate, while the Sydney Morning Herald listed him as an Independent Labour candidate.)	162	3.5	
Total formal votes		4,641	96.5	
Informal votes		171	3.6	
Turnout		4,812	63.7	
Former Progressive hold				

=== Tenterfield ===
1907 New South Wales state election: Tenterfield
Party	Candidate	Votes	%	±%
Liberal Reform	Charles Lee	3,111	53.1	
Independent	Robert Pyers	2,753	47.0	
Total formal votes		5,864	97.0	
Informal votes		182	3.0	
Turnout		6,046	66.6	
Liberal Reform hold				

=== The Upper Hunter ===
1907 New South Wales state election: The Upper Hunter
Party	Candidate	Votes	%	±%
Liberal Reform	William Fleming	2,301	49.8	
Labour	William Ashford	2,146	46.4	
Independent	Edward Eagar	117	2.5	
Independent	Wilfred Young	57	1.2	
Total formal votes		4,621	97.4	
Informal votes		123	2.6	
Turnout		4,744	67.5	
Liberal Reform hold				

=== Waratah ===
1907 New South Wales state election: Waratah
Party	Candidate	Votes	%	±%
Labour	John Estell	3,214	84.6	
Independent	David Renfrew	585	15.4	
Total formal votes		3,799	93.7	
Informal votes		256	6.3	
Turnout		4,055	54.5	
Labour hold				

=== Waverley ===
1907 New South Wales state election: Waverley
Party	Candidate	Votes	%	±%
Independent Liberal	James Macarthur-Onslow	3,769	48.4	
Liberal Reform	Thomas Jessep	3,189	40.9	
Labour	Edward Whittington	458	5.9	
Independent	Frank Lock	379	4.9	
Total formal votes		7,795	98.5	
Informal votes		119	1.5	
Turnout		7,914	73.3	
Independent Liberal gain from Liberal Reform				

=== Wickham ===
1907 New South Wales state election: Wickham
Party	Candidate	Votes	%	±%
Labour	William Grahame	3,607	55.5	
Former Progressive	John Fegan	2,892	44.5	
Total formal votes		6,499	96.9	
Informal votes		206	3.1	
Turnout		6,705	74.2	
Labour gain from Progressive				

=== Wollondilly ===
1907 New South Wales state election: Wollondilly
Party	Candidate	Votes	%	±%
Liberal Reform	William McCourt	3,220	78.1	
Independent	Leonard Green	671	16.3	
Labour	Laurence Gilmartin	232	5.6	
Total formal votes		4,123	96.4	
Informal votes		153	3.6	
Turnout		4,276	56.3	
Liberal Reform hold				

=== Wollongong ===
1907 New South Wales state election: Wollongong
Party	Candidate	Votes	%	±%
Labour	John Nicholson	3,333	56.6	
Liberal Reform	Alexander Campbell	2,556	43.4	
Total formal votes		5,889	96.9	
Informal votes		189	3.1	
Turnout		6,078	68.5	
Labour hold				

=== Woollahra ===
1907 New South Wales state election: Woollahra
Party	Candidate	Votes	%	±%
Liberal Reform	William Latimer	3,072	70.2	
Labour	Robert Usher	1,306	29.8	
Total formal votes		4,378	96.7	
Informal votes		149	3.3	
Turnout		4,527	55.3	
Liberal Reform hold				

=== Wynyard ===
1907 New South Wales state election: Wynyard
Party	Candidate	Votes	%	±%
Former Progressive	Robert Donaldson	2,881	57.8	
Labour	Patrick Sullivan	2,100	42.2	
Total formal votes		4,981	98.0	
Informal votes		101	2.0	
Turnout		5,082	77.9	
Former Progressive hold				

=== Yass ===
1907 New South Wales state election: Yass
Party	Candidate	Votes	%	±%
Labour	Niels Nielsen	2,705	52.4	
Liberal Reform	Bernard Grogan	2,453	47.6	
Total formal votes		5,158	98.0	
Informal votes		104	2.0	
Turnout		5,262	71.0	
Labour hold				

== See also ==
- Candidates of the 1907 New South Wales state election
- Members of the New South Wales Legislative Assembly, 1907–1910
