= Electoral results for the district of West Macquarie =

Election result for West Macquarie, New South Wales, Australia

West Macquarie, an electoral district of the Legislative Assembly in the Australian state of New South Wales was created in 1859 and abolished in 1904.

Member	Party	Period
1859	John McPhillamy	None
1859 by	Henry Mort	None
1860	Richard Driver	None
1864	Richard Driver	None
1869	Edmund Webb	None
1872	Edmund Webb	None
1875	Charles Pilcher	None
1877	Charles Pilcher	None
1880	Charles Pilcher	None
1882	Thomas Hellyer	None
1884 by	Lewis Lloyd	None
1885	Lewis Lloyd	None
1887	Fergus Smith	Free Trade
1889	Paddy Crick	Protectionist
1890 by	Paddy Crick	Protectionist
1891	Paddy Crick	Protectionist
1895	Paddy Crick	Protectionist
1898	Paddy Crick	National Federal
1901	Paddy Crick	Progressive

== Election results ==
=== Elections in the 1900s ===
==== 1901 ====
1901 New South Wales state election: West Macquarie
Party	Candidate	Votes	%	±%
Progressive	Paddy Crick	1,152	59.2	+3.6
Liberal Reform	Otto Jaeger	795	40.8	−2.3
Total formal votes		1,947	99.0	+0.8
Informal votes		19	1.0	−0.8
Turnout		1,966	52.6	−4.7
Progressive hold				

=== Elections in the 1890s ===
==== 1898 ====
1898 New South Wales colonial election: West Macquarie
Party	Candidate	Votes	%	±%
National Federal	Paddy Crick	888	55.6	
Free Trade	John Hurley	689	43.1	
Independent Federalist	Edward Goldsby	20	1.3	
Total formal votes		1,597	98.3	
Informal votes		28	1.7	
Turnout		1,625	57.3	
National Federal hold				

==== 1895 ====
1895 New South Wales colonial election: West Macquarie
Party	Candidate	Votes	%	±%
Protectionist	Paddy Crick	876	55.0	
Free Trade	John Hurley	716	45.0	
Total formal votes		1,592	98.9	
Informal votes		18	1.1	
Turnout		1,610	61.4	
Protectionist hold				

==== 1894 ====
1894 New South Wales colonial election: West Macquarie
Party	Candidate	Votes	%	±%
Protectionist	Paddy Crick	820	45.7	
Free Trade	R W Peacock	472	26.3	
Labour	John Bridgeman	259	14.5	
Ind. Free Trade	Charles Jeanneret	208	11.6	
Independent	J O'Donoghue	34	1.9	
Total formal votes		1,793	95.9	
Informal votes		76	4.1	
Turnout		1,869	71.6	
Protectionist win		(new seat)		

==== 1891 ====
1891 New South Wales colonial election: West Macquarie Saturday 20 June
Party	Candidate	Votes	%	±%
Protectionist	Paddy Crick (re-elected)	510	54.3	
Free Trade	Charles Boyd	429	45.7	
Total formal votes		939	97.8	
Informal votes		21	2.2	
Turnout		960	74.9	
Protectionist hold				

==== 1890 by-election ====
1890 West Macquarie by-election Saturday 6 December
Party	Candidate	Votes	%	±%
Protectionist	Paddy Crick (re-elected)	496	56.0	+0.9
Free Trade	Charles Boyd (Note: Boyd's party affiliation is taken from reports in the Sydney Morning Herald, the Daily Telegraph, and the National Advocate, which record Boyd as campaigning as a Free Trader, while Antony Green lists him as an independent stating that his party affiliation was unclear from the reports Green had examined.)	390	44.0	−0.9
Total formal votes		886	100.0	+1.8
Informal votes		0	0.0	−1.8
Turnout		886	74.4	+1.2
Protectionist hold				

Paddy Crick (Free Trade) was expelled.

=== Elections in the 1880s ===
==== 1889 ====
1889 New South Wales colonial election: West Macquarie Saturday 16 February
Party	Candidate	Votes	%	±%
Protectionist	Paddy Crick (elected)	470	55.1	
Free Trade	Bernhard Wise	383	44.9	
Total formal votes		853	98.2	
Informal votes		16	1.8	
Turnout		869	73.2	
Protectionist gain from Free Trade				

==== 1887 ====
1887 New South Wales colonial election: West Macquarie Thursday 17 February
Party	Candidate	Votes	%	±%
Free Trade	Fergus Smith (elected)	340	48.3	
Protectionist	Paddy Crick	255	36.2	
Protectionist	John Hughes	109	15.5	
Total formal votes		704	98.9	
Informal votes		8	1.1	
Turnout		712	64.2	

==== 1885 ====
1885 New South Wales colonial election: West Macquarie Thursday 22 October
Candidate	Votes	%
Lewis Lloyd (re-elected)	355	56.3
James Fitzpatrick	276	43.7
Total formal votes	631	98.0
Informal votes	13	2.0
Turnout	644	59.5

==== 1884 by-election ====
1884 West Macquarie by-election Wednesday 2 July
Candidate	Votes	%
Lewis Lloyd (elected)	375	67.2
William Richardson	183	32.8
Total formal votes	558	98.6
Informal votes	8	1.4
Turnout	566	53.9

Thomas Hellyer resigned.

==== 1882 ====
1882 New South Wales colonial election: West Macquarie Wednesday 13 December
Candidate	Votes	%
Thomas Hellyer (elected)	unopposed	

The sitting member Charles Pilcher unsuccessfully contested West Sydney.

==== 1880 ====
1880 New South Wales colonial election: West Macquarie Saturday 27 November
Candidate	Votes	%
Charles Pilcher (re-elected)	461	53.3
Alfred Pechey	404	46.7
Total formal votes	865	97.5
Informal votes	22	2.5
Turnout	882	79.3

=== Elections in the 1870s ===
==== 1877 ====
1877 New South Wales colonial election: West Macquarie Wednesday 31 October
Candidate	Votes	%
Charles Pilcher (re-elected)	314	59.3
Alexander Rae	216	40.8
Total formal votes	530	98.0
Informal votes	11	2.0
Turnout	541	47.3

==== 1875 ====
1874–75 New South Wales colonial election: West Macquarie Monday 4 January 1875
Candidate	Votes	%
Charles Pilcher (elected)	425	58.7
Henry Rotton	299	41.3
Total formal votes	724	97.8
Informal votes	16	2.2
Turnout	740	57.7

The sitting member for West Macquarie was Edmund Webb who unsuccessfully contested Bathurst.

==== 1872 ====
1872 New South Wales colonial election: West Macquarie Saturday 24 February
Candidate	Votes	%
Edmund Webb (re-elected)	320	78.6
George Thornton	87	21.4
Total formal votes	407	98.3
Informal votes	7	1.7
Turnout	414	40.2

=== Elections in the 1860s ===
==== 1869 ====
1869–70 New South Wales colonial election: West Macquarie Wednesday 15 December 1869
Candidate	Votes	%
Edmund Webb (elected)	397	57.6
Richard Driver (defeated)	292	42.4
Total formal votes	689	98.0
Informal votes	14	2.0
Turnout	703	74.9

==== 1864 ====
1864–65 New South Wales colonial election: West Macquarie Saturday 24 December 1864
Candidate	Votes	%
Richard Driver (re-elected)	unopposed	

==== 1860 ====
1860 New South Wales colonial election: West Macquarie Monday 10 December
Candidate	Votes	%
Richard Driver (elected)	188	67.1
John Clements (defeated)	92	32.9
Total formal votes	280	100.0
Informal votes	0	0.0
Turnout	280	38.4

=== Elections in the 1850s ===
==== 1859 by-election ====
1859 West Macquarie by-election Wednesday 21 December
Candidate	Votes	%
Henry Mort (elected)	show of hands	
Richard Driver		

John McPhillamy resigned.

==== 1859 ====
1859 New South Wales colonial election: West Macquarie Tuesday 14 June
Candidate	Votes	%
John McPhillamy (elected)	264	83.0
Thomas Hawkins	54	17.0
Total formal votes	318	100.0
Informal votes	0	0.0
Turnout	318	60.9
