= Members of the New South Wales Legislative Assembly, 1907–1910 =

The members of the New South Wales Legislative Assembly who served in the 21st parliament of New South Wales from 1907 to 1910 were elected at the 1907 state election on 10 September 1907. The Speaker was William McCourt.

Name	Party	Electorate	Term in office
Richard Arthur	Liberal Reform	Middle Harbour	1904–1932
William Ashford (Note: William Fleming (Liberal Reform) resigned to unsuccessfully contest the 1910 federal election for New England. The 1910 Upper Hunter by-election was won by Labour candidate William Ashford.)	Labour	The Upper Hunter	1910–1925
Richard Ball	Liberal Reform	Corowa	1895–1898 1904–1937
Charles Barton	Liberal Reform	The Macquarie	1907–1910
George Beeby	Labour	Blayney	1907–1913 1917–1920
George Briner	Former Progressive	Raleigh	1901–1920
Ernest Broughton	Liberal Reform	King	1901–1910
William Brown	Independent Liberal	Durham	1907–1917
George Burgess	Labour	Burrangong	1901–1917
John Cann	Labour	Broken Hill	1891–1916
Campbell Carmichael	Labour	Leichhardt	1907–1920
Joseph Carruthers (Note: St George MLA and former Premier Joseph Carruthers (Liberal Reform) resigned in May 1908. The 1908 St George by-election was won by Liberal Reform candidate William Taylor.)	Liberal Reform	St George	1887–1908
Matthew Charlton (Note: Matthew Charlton (Labour) resigned to successfully contest the 1910 federal election for Hunter. The 1910 Northumberland by-election was won by Labour candidate William Kearsley.)	Labour	Northumberland	1903–1910
Edward Clark	Independent	St Leonards	1891–1910
John Cochran (Note: John Norton (Independent) resigned to unsuccessfully contest the 1910 federal Senate election for NSW. The 1910 Darling Harbour by-election was won by Labour candidate John Cochran.)	Labour	Darling Harbour	1910–1920
John Cohen	Liberal Reform	Petersham	1898–1919
Albert Collins	Independent Liberal	The Namoi	1901–1910
John Cusack (Note: Granville Ryrie (Liberal Reform) resigned to unsuccessfully contest the 1910 federal election for Werriwa. The 1910 Queanbeyan by-election was won by Labour candidate John Cusack.)	Labour	Queanbeyan	1910–1917
John Dacey	Labour	Alexandria	1895–1912
Robert Davidson	Liberal Reform	Hastings and Macleay	1901–1910
Robert Donaldson	Former Progressive	Wynyard	1898–1913
James Dooley	Labour	Hartley	1907–1927
Fred Downes	Liberal Reform	Camden	1904–1913
Alfred Edden	Labour	Kahibah	1891–1920
John Estell	Labour	Waratah	1901–1922
James Fallick	Liberal Reform	Singleton	1901–1920
David Fell	Liberal Reform	Lane Cove	1904–1913
John Fitzpatrick	Liberal Reform	Orange	1895–1904 1907–1930
William Fleming	Liberal Reform	The Upper Hunter	1901–1910
Owen Gilbert	Liberal Reform	Newcastle	1901–1910
John Gillies	Liberal Reform	Maitland	1891–1911
Sir James Graham	Liberal Reform	Surry Hills	1904–1910
William Grahame	Labour	Wickham	1907–1920
Arthur Griffith (Note: Sturt Labour MLA Arthur Griffith resigned from parliament after a dispute with the Speaker in November 1908. He was unopposed in the 1908 Sturt by-election.)	Labour	Sturt	1894–1903 1904–1920
Brinsley Hall	Liberal Reform	The Hawkesbury	1901–1917
Thomas Henley	Liberal Reform	Burwood	1904–1935
James Hogue	Liberal Reform	The Glebe	1894–1895 1998-1910
George Hindmarsh	Liberal Reform	Rous	1905–1913
Robert Hollis	Labour	Newtown	1901–1917
William Holman	Labour	Cootamundra	1898–1920
Henry Horne	Labour	Liverpool Plains	1907–1911
John Hunt	Liberal Reform	Sherbrooke	1907–1920
Augustus James	Liberal Reform	Goulburn	1907–1920
George Jones	Labour	The Gwydir	1902–1913
Robert Jones	Liberal Reform	Mudgee	1891–1898 1907–1910
William Kearsley	Labour	Northumberland	1910–1921
Andrew Kelly	Labour	The Lachlan	1891–1894 1901–1913
William Latimer	Liberal Reform	Woollahra	1901–1920
Charles Lee	Liberal Reform	Tenterfield	1884–1920
Robert Levien	Former Progressive	Tamworth	1880–1889, 1889–1913
Daniel Levy	Liberal Reform	Darlinghurst	1901–1937
Edmund Lonsdale	Liberal Reform	Armidale	1891–1894 1895–1898 1901–1905 1907–1913
John Lynch	Labour	Ashburnham	1907–1913
James Macarthur-Onslow	Independent Liberal	Waverley	1907–1922
Donald Macdonell	Labour	Cobar	1901–1911
William Mahony	Liberal Reform	Annandale	1894–1910
William McCourt	Liberal Reform	Wollondilly	1882–1885 1887–1913
Richard McCoy	Liberal Reform	Marrickville	1901–1910
John McFarlane	Liberal Reform	The Clarence	1887–1915
Patrick McGarry	Labour	The Murrumbidgee	1904–1920
James McGowen	Labour	Redfern	1891–1917
Gordon McLaurin	Former Progressive	Albury	1901–1913
John McNeill	Labour	Pyrmont	1902–1913
Richard Meagher	Independent	Phillip	1895 1898–1904 1907–1917
John Meehan	Labour	The Darling	1904–1913
James Mercer	Labour	Rozelle	1907–1917
William Millard	Liberal Reform	The Clyde	1894–1920 1920–1921
Gus Miller	Labour	Monaro	1889–1918
John Miller	Liberal Reform	Bathurst	1907–1913
Patrick Minahan (Note: Edward O'Sullivan (Labour) died on 25 April 1910. The 1910 Belmore by-election was won by Labour candidate Patrick Minahan.)	Labour	Belmore	1910–1917 1920–1927
Samuel Moore	Liberal Reform	Bingara	1885–1910
Mark Morton	Liberal Reform	Allowrie	1901–1920 1922–1938
Tom Moxham	Liberal Reform	Parramatta	1901–1916
John Nicholson	Labour	Wollongong	1891–1917
Niels Nielsen	Labour	Yass	1899–1913
John Nobbs	Liberal Reform	Granville	1888–1993 1898–1913
John Norton	Independent	Darling Harbour	1898–1906 1807–1910
Charles Oakes	Liberal Reform	Paddington	1901–1910 1917–1925
Edward O'Sullivan	Former Progressive / Labour (Note: Belmore MLA Edward O'Sullivan was elected as a Former Progressive but joined the Labour Party in 1909.)	Belmore	1885–1910
Fred Page	Labour	Botany	1907–1917
Varney Parkes	Independent Liberal	Canterbury	1885–1888, 1891–1913
John Perry	Liberal Reform	Richmond	1889–1920
Henry Peters	Labour	Deniliquin	1907–1914
Richard Price	Independent	Gloucester	1894–1904 1907–1922
William Robson	Liberal Reform	Ashfield	1905–1920
Granville Ryrie	Liberal Reform	Queanbeyan	1906–1910
Robert Scobie	Labour	The Murray	1901–1917
David Storey	Liberal Reform	Randwick	1894–1920
John Storey	Labour	Balmain	1901–1904 1907–1921
Robert Stuart-Robertson	Labour	Camperdown	1907–1933
William Taylor	Liberal Reform	St George	1908–1913
Follett Thomas	Liberal Reform	Gough	1903–1920
John Treflé	Labour	The Castlereagh	1906–1915
Thomas Waddell	Liberal Reform	Belubula	1897–1917
Charles Wade	Liberal Reform	Gordon	1903–1917
William Wood	Liberal Reform	Bega	1894–1913

== See also ==
- Wade ministry
- Results of the 1907 New South Wales state election
- Candidates of the 1907 New South Wales state election
