= 1907 Blayney state by-election =

Election result for Blayney, New South Wales, Australia

- 12 January 1907

Electoral district of Blayney in the Legislative Assembly of New South Wales
- Turnout: 50.6% (▼15.5%)
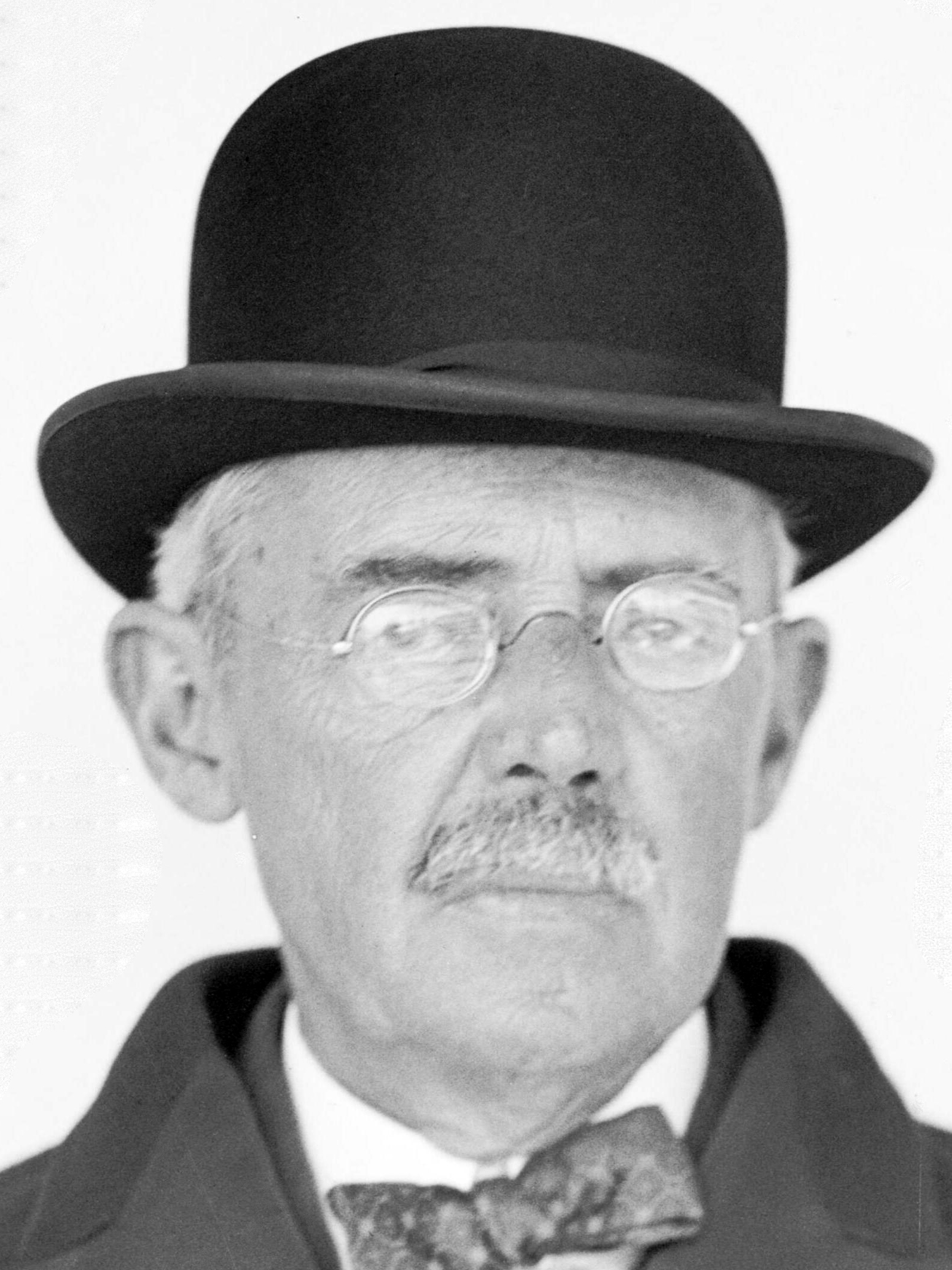
	First party	Second party
	LRP
Candidate	John Withington	George Beeby
Party	Liberal Reform	Labor
Popular vote	1,733	1,710
Percentage	50.33%	49.67%
MLA before election
Paddy Crick
Progressive
Elected MLA
John Withington
Liberal Reform

A by-election was held for the New South Wales Legislative Assembly electorate of Blayney on 12 January 1907 because Paddy Crick (Progressive) resigned from Parliament after findings of corruption made by a Royal Commission. Crick had also been expelled from the Legislative Assembly for outrageous behaviour in the chamber, however he was returned in the resulting by-election.

The Royal Commission handed down an interim report in May 1906, which found that 50% of the sums received by a land agent Peter Close were paid to Crick whilst he was Minister for Lands. The Legislative Assembly proposed to immediately deal with Crick, however the Speaker ruled that the Assembly could not deal with the matter as it might prejudice his criminal trial. Instead the assembly amended its standing orders and suspended Crick pending the outcome of his criminal trial. The jury was unable to reach a unanimous verdict, and the Attorney General declined to prosecute the matter again as evidence before the Royal Commission had been ruled inadmissible in his criminal trial. Crick then submitted his resignation from parliament, however before it was accepted the assembly passed a motion that he was guilty of conduct that rendered him ineligible to sit as a member. Rutledge and Nairn stated this was due to old scores being paid off, while Anne Twomey stated that this motion was passed to influence future voters not to vote for Crick. In any event Crick did not nominate for the by-election.

== Dates ==
Date	Event
14 Jun 1904	Paddy Crick ceased to be Minister for Lands
1 May 1905	Justice William Owen appointed Royal Commissioner to inquire into the administration of the Lands Department.
23 May 1906	Interim report of the Royal Commission submitted to the Governor.
24 July 1906	Paddy Crick was suspended from the Legislative Assembly until the verdict of the jury in his criminal trial.
13 November 1906	Trial of Paddy Crick and William Willis commenced before Justice Robert Pring and a jury.
28 November 1906	Jury unable to reach a verdict in the trial of Crick and Willis.
6 December 1906	Paddy Crick submitted his resignation.
11 December 1906	Legislative Assembly passed a motion that Paddy Crick was guilty of conduct that rendered him ineligible to sit as a member of the Assembly.
14 December 1906	Writ of election issued by the Speaker of the Legislative Assembly.
29 December 1906	Nominations
12 January 1907	Polling day
29 January 1907	Return of writ

== Results ==
1907 Blayney state by-election
Party	Candidate	Votes	%	±%
Liberal Reform	John Withington	1,733	50.3	
Labor	George Beeby	1,710	49.7	
Total formal votes		3,443	100.0	+0.7
Informal votes		0	0.0	−0.7
Turnout		3,443	50.6	−15.5
Liberal Reform gain from Progressive				

== Aftermath ==
Paddy Crick was struck off the roll of solicitors on 23 August 1907 because of the evidence before the Royal Commission. He challenged the validity of his suspension in the Supreme Court and was successful before the Full Court, however this was overturned on appeal to the Privy Council which held that the Legislative Assembly was the sole judge whether an "occasion" had arisen that affected the orderly conduct of the Assembly.

Crick stood for parliament again at the September 1907 election for Surry Hills but was unsuccessful. He died the following year.

== See also ==
- Electoral results for the district of Blayney
