= 1907 New South Wales state election =

Colonial election for New South Wales, Australia in September 1907

- 10 September 1907

All 90 seats in the New South Wales Legislative Assembly 46 Assembly seats were needed for a majority

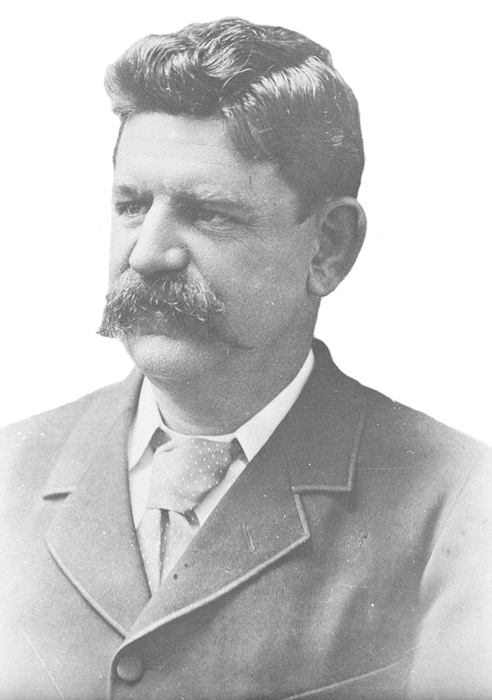
	First party	Second party
Leader	Sir Joseph Carruthers	James McGowen
Party	Liberal Reform	Labor Electoral League
Leader since	18 September 1902	August 1894
Leader's seat	St George	Redfern
Last election	45 seats	25 seats
Seats won	45 seats	32 seats
Seat change	0	▲7
Percentage	45.91	33.31%
Swing	▲1.33	▲10.01
- Legislative Assembly after the election
Premier before election
Sir Joseph Carruthers
Liberal Reform
Elected Premier
Sir Joseph Carruthers
Liberal Reform

The 1907 New South Wales state election was held on 10 September 1907 for all of the 90 seats in the 21st New South Wales Legislative Assembly and it was conducted in single-member constituencies with a first past the post voting system. Both adult males and females were entitled to vote, but not Indigenous people. The 20th parliament of New South Wales was dissolved on 19 August 1907 by the Governor, Sir Harry Rawson, on the advice of the Premier, Sir Joseph Carruthers.

== Key dates ==
Date	Event
19 August 1907	The Legislative Assembly was dissolved, and writs were issued by the Governor to proceed with an election.
30 August 1907	Nominations for candidates for the election closed at noon.
10 September 1907	Polling day.
2 October 1907	Opening of 21st Parliament.

== Results ==
New South Wales state election, 10 September 1907 Legislative Assembly << 1904–1910 >>
Enrolled voters	745,900				
Votes cast	458,408		Turnout	66.72	+7.41
Informal votes	13,543		Informal	2.87	+1.88
Summary of votes by party
Party	Primary votes	%	Swing	Seats	Change
Liberal Reform	210,456	45.91	+1.33	45	0
Labour	152,704	33.31	+10.01	32	+7
Independent	46,551	10.15	+3.69	4	+2
Independent Liberal	26,192	5.71	+0.37	4	+2
Former Progressive	21,759	4.75	−14.23	5	−11
Socialist	746	0.16	+0.10	0	0
Total	458,408			90	

Popular vote
Liberal Reform	45.91%
Labor	33.31%
Independent	10.15%
Ind. Liberal	5.71%
Fmr. Progressive	4.75%
Others	0.16%
Parliamentary seats
Liberal Reform	45
Labor	32
Fmr. Progressive	5
Independent	4
Ind. Liberal	4

== Retiring members ==
=== Liberal ===
- Rowland Anderson MLA (Botany)
- James Ashton MLA (Goulburn)
- William Dick MLA (Newcastle)
- Sydney Kearney MLA (Armidale)
- Broughton O'Conor MLA (Sherbrooke)
- Edwin Richards MLA (Mudgee)

=== Independent ===
- George Reynoldson MLA (Deniliquin)

== Changing seats ==
Seats changing hands
Seat	1904			Swing (Note: Swing is calculated using the Butler method, being the average of the 1907 winning party percentage-point gain and the 1904 losing party percentage-point loss. NA is used where one of the parties did not contest both elections.)	1907		
Seat	Party	Member	±	Swing	±	Member	Party
Ashburnham	Liberal Reform	Eden George	+10.9	+5.7	+22.3	John Lynch	Labor
Balmain	Liberal Reform	Walter Anderson	-2.8	+2.8	+2.8	John Storey	Labor
Bathurst	Progressive	William Young	-6.5	+6.5	+6.5	John Miller	Liberal Reform
Blayney	Progressive	Paddy Crick (Note: Paddy Crick (Progressive) had won Blayney at the 1904 election, however he was expelled by the Assembly after being accused of bribery. The by-election in January 1907 was won by John Withington (Liberal Reform) who was defeated by George Beeby (Labor) at the 1907 general election.)	NA	NA	NA	George Beeby	Labor
Botany	Liberal Reform	Rowland Anderson	+5.9	+4.2	+14.3	Fred Page	Labor
Camperdown	Progressive	James Smith	NA	NA	NA	Robert Stuart-Robertson	Labor
Canterbury	Liberal Reform	Thomas Mackenzie	-27.4	NA	NA	Varney Parkes	Independent Liberal
Darling Harbour	Labor	William Daley	-18.5	NA	NA	John Norton	Independent
Deniliquin	Independent	George Reynoldson	-26.4	NA	NA	Henry Peters	Labor
Durham	Progressive	Walter Bennett	+3.0	+14.1	+31.2	William Brown	Independent Liberal
Gloucester	Liberal Reform	James Young	-13.0	NA	NA	Richard Price	Independent
Hartley	Liberal Reform	John Hurley	-8.1	+8.1	+8.1	James Dooley	Labor
Leichhardt	Liberal Reform	Robert Booth	-0.9	+8.4	+15.8	Campbell Carmichael	Labor
Liverpool Plains	Independent Liberal	John Perry (b 1849)	+2.7	+1.8	+6.3	Henry Horne	Labor
The Macquarie	Labor	Charles Barton	-0.7	+1.4	+2.0	Thomas Thrower	Liberal Reform
Mudgee	Progressive	Edwin Richards	NA	NA	+3.8	Robert Jones	Liberal Reform
Orange	Labor	Albert Gardiner	+4.8	+4.7	+14.1	John Fitzpatrick	Liberal Reform
Phillip	Labor	Phillip Sullivan	-27.5	NA	NA	Richard Meagher	Independent
Rozelle	Liberal Reform	Sydney Law	-4.1	+4.1	+4.1	James Mercer	Labor
St Leonards	Liberal Reform	Thomas Creswell	-18.9	+9.2	-0.5	Edward Clark	Independent
Surry Hills	Independent	John Norton (Note: John Norton challenged William Holman to face a by-election and was soundly defeated at the Surry Hills by-election in July 1906, finishing fourth behind Albert Bruntnell (Liberal Reform). At the 1907 general election Bruntnell chose to contest Alexandria but the seat was retained for Liberal Reform by Sir James Graham.)	NA	NA	+3.1	Sir James Graham	Liberal Reform
Waverley	Liberal Reform	Thomas Jessep	-22.1	NA	NA	James Macarthur-Onslow	Independent Liberal
Wickham	Progressive	John Fegan	+4.7	+11.4	+27.5	William Grahame	Labor
Members changing party
Seat	1907			±	1910		
Seat	Party	Member	%	±	%	Member	Party
Belubula	Progressive	Thomas Waddell	57.2	-2.6	54.6	Thomas Waddell	Liberal Reform
The Clarence	Progressive	John McFarlane	NA	NA	NA	John McFarlane	Liberal Reform
The Hawkesbury	Progressive	Brinsley Hall	51.2	+14.4	65.6	Brinsley Hall	Liberal Reform
Maitland	Progressive	John Gillies	51.5	+31.2	82.7	John Gillies	Liberal Reform
The Richmond	Progressive	John Perry (b 1845)	38.0	+22.3	60.3	John Perry (b 1845)	Liberal Reform

== See also ==
- Candidates of the 1907 New South Wales state election
- Members of the New South Wales Legislative Assembly, 1907–1910
