= Electoral results for the district of Belubula =

Election results for Belubula, New South Wales, Australia

Belubula, an electoral district of the Legislative Assembly in the Australian state of New South Wales was created in 1904 and abolished in 1913.

Election	Member	Party
1904	Thomas Waddell	Progressive
1907	Thomas Waddell	Liberal Reform
1910	Thomas Waddell	Liberal Reform

== Election results ==
=== Elections in the 1910s ===
==== 1910 ====
1910 New South Wales state election: Belubula
Party	Candidate	Votes	%	±%
Liberal Reform	Thomas Waddell	3,414	56.6	
Labour	Cornelius Danahey	2,619	43.4	
Total formal votes		6,033	97.7	
Informal votes		140	2.3	
Turnout		6,173	67.0	
Liberal Reform hold				

=== Elections in the 1900s ===
==== 1907 ====
1907 New South Wales state election: Belubula
Party	Candidate	Votes	%	±%
Liberal Reform	Thomas Waddell	2,789	54.6	−2.6
Labour	George Ross	2,321	45.4	
Total formal votes		5,110	95.8	
Informal votes		222	4.2	
Turnout		5,332	67.9	
Member changed to Liberal Reform from Progressive		Swing	−2.6	

==== 1904 ====
1904 New South Wales state election: Belubula
Party	Candidate	Votes	%	±%
Progressive	Thomas Waddell	3,009	57.2	
Liberal Reform	Thomas Rose	2,255	42.8	
Total formal votes		5,264	99.4	
Informal votes		32	0.6	
Turnout		5,296	71.7	
Progressive win		(new seat)		

Belubula was a new seat consisting of the abolished seat of Cowra and parts of Ashburnum, Orange and the abolished seat of Molong. Thomas Waddell (Progressive) was the member for the abolished seat of Cowra. The member for Orange was Harry Newman (Liberal Reform) who died two months prior to the election. The member for Molong was Andrew Ross (Independent Liberal) who unsuccessfully contested Orange. Thomas Rose (Liberal Reform) was member for the abolished seat of Argyle.
