= Beeby (surname) =

Beeby is an English surname. Notable people with this surname include the following:

- Augustus Beeby, British footballer
- Beatrice Beeby (1903–1991), New Zealand educator
- Bruce Beeby (1921–2013), Australian actor
- C. E. Beeby (1902–1998), New Zealand educator
- Chris Beeby, New Zealand diplomat
- Doris Beeby (1894–1948), Australian trade unionist
- George Beeby (1869–1942), Australian politician, judge and author
- George Beeby (horse racing) (1904–1977), British horse trainer
- Richard Beeby (born 1962), English football referee
- Thomas H. Beeby (born 1941), American architect
- Victor Beeby (1891–1944), New Zealand cricketer
