= 1913 Blayney state by-election =

Election result for Blayney, New South Wales, Australia

A by-election was held for the New South Wales Legislative Assembly electorate of Blayney on 3 January 1913, following the resignation of George Beeby (Labour). Beeby was a Minister for Labour and Industry and Secretary for Lands in the McGowen ministry, however he resigned from the ministry, parliament and party in protest at the power of the extra-parliamentary Labor Party executive.

== Dates ==
Date	Event
9 December 1912	George Beeby resigned.
10 December 1912	Writ of election issued by the Speaker of the Legislative Assembly.
18 December 1912	Day of nomination
3 January 1913	Polling day
23 January	Second ballot
28 January 1913	Return of writ

== Result ==
1913 Blayney by-election Friday 3 January
Party	Candidate	Votes	%	±%
Liberal Reform	John Withington	1,800	44.2	−0.8
Independent	George Beeby	1,156	28.4	
Labour	Valentine Johnston	1,120	27.5	−28.5
Total formal votes		4,077	100.0	+1.2
Informal votes		0	0.0	−1.2
Turnout		4,077	56.6 (Note: estimate based on an electoral roll of 7,207 at the 1910 election.)	−14.9

A second ballot was necessary because no candidate had won an absolute majority.

1913 Blayney by-election - Second Round Thursday 23 January
Party	Candidate	Votes	%	±%
Independent	George Beeby	2,244	51.6	
Liberal Reform	John Withington	2,108	48.4	+3.4
Total formal votes		4,356	99.0	+0.2
Informal votes		43	1.0	−0.2
Turnout		4,399	61.0	−10.5
Member changed to Independent from Labour		Swing	N/A	

== See also ==
- Electoral results for the district of Blayney
- List of New South Wales state by-elections
