= 1890 West Macquarie colonial by-election =

By-election in New South Wales, Australia

A by-election was held for the New South Wales Legislative Assembly electorate of West Macquarie on 6 December 1890 because Paddy Crick (Protectionist) was expelled for outrageous behaviour in the chamber.

== Dates ==
Date	Event
13 November 1890	Paddy Crick expelled.
14 November 1890	Writ of election issued by the Speaker of the Legislative Assembly.
1 December 1890	Nominations
6 December 1890	Polling day
16 December 1890	Return of writ

== Background ==
Crick was notable for his verbal aggression in the house, especially when drunk, and in October 1889 he called several parliamentarians "bloody Orange hounds and thieves" and William McMillan moved a motion that "That Mr. Crick, the hon. member for West Macquarie, is guilty of having wilfully and vexatiously interrupted tho committee in the orderly coronet of the business of the House, wherefore this House adjudges him guilty of contempt of the House". The motion was passed by the Assembly and Crick stated "If any hon. member thought he was going to apologise to the Government he was making a great mistake. ... he would sooner be kicked out of the House on what he considered a looting of the Treasury than remain a member of it". Crick then walked out of the house.

On 12 November 1890 there was a debate involving McMillan when Crick interjected, with McMillan stating to Crick "You are nobody", with Crick responding in kind and describing McMillan as a makeshift. Ninian Melville, the Chairman of Committees called on McMillan to withdraw the expression and he did so. The Chairman then asked Crick to withdraw his expression. Crick debated the matter with the Chairman before withdrawing it. The Chairman then repeatedly asked Crick to apologise for interjecting during proceedings and he refused to do so until after McMillan had apologised for the insult. The Chairman instructed the serjeant-at-arms, Laurence Harnett, to remove Crick, who resisted stating "Don't you handle me. I will not be bullied by Melville or any one else. I will not go out, and I say so point-blank". Crick was then physically removed by the serjeant-at-arms and attendants. The disturbance was reported to the Speaker, Joseph Abbott, who directed that Crick be allowed into the chamber to provide his explanation. Crick argued with Speaker stating "I am certainly not going to allow the Chair to knock me into a sort of pulverised sausage". Crick continued to argue with the Speaker who then instructed the serjeant-at-arms to again remove Crick. Whilst he was being forcibly removed, Crick stated "you got £2,000 for putting the Broken Hill Water Supply Bill through. That is what I tell you; and I tell the Chairman of Committees that he got £1,000; and I tell you you are both a pair of thieves and robbers of the country". Sir Henry Parkes moved that Crick be expelled for his disorderly conduct before the committee.

After debate had commenced on the motion, Crick attempted to resign with his letter stating "Mr Speaker, I consider Parliament rotten and corrupt. You put me out to-night, fearing my tongue and consequent exposure. I resign my seat, and intend to appeal to my constituents against a rotten and corrupt parliament, in which freedom of speech is brutally stifled and suppressed in order to cover up crime". In the debate various euphemisms were put as to the extent of Crick's consumption of alcohol, including that he was not in a fit condition to be heard, was slightly excited, having just returned from the Melbourne Cup, where "joviality ... reigned triumphant ... where Bacchus is the chief god". Alexander Hutchison stated that "it was worse than useless to ask a drunken man to come into an assemblage of gentlemen to make an explanation of his conduct". Crick's resignation was not treated as effective and he was expelled.

== Candidates ==
- Paddy Crick repeated his accusations of corruption in his campaign speeches.
- Charles Boyd was a grazier from Bathurst. Each of the Sydney Morning Herald, the Daily Telegraph, and the National Advocate, record Boyd as campaigning as a Free Trader, while Antony Green lists him as an independent stating that his party affiliation was unclear from the reports Green had examined.

== Result ==
1890 West Macquarie by-election Saturday 6 December
Party	Candidate	Votes	%	±%
Protectionist	Paddy Crick (re-elected)	496	56.0	+0.9
Free Trade	Charles Boyd	390	44.0	−0.9
Total formal votes		886	100.0	+1.8
Informal votes		0	0.0	−1.8
Turnout		886	74.4	+1.2
Protectionist hold				

== Aftermath ==
At a meeting at the Lagoon, Major Butler asked "Is it true, Mr. Crick, that you stated that there was not a virtuous woman in West Macquarie?" Crick alleged he then stated "I was told so; and, more than that, I believe that you did say so". Crick sued Butler for slander, however the jury found for Butler. The Full Court of the Supreme Court held that a question put bona fide by an elector in the course of an election meeting would not be slanderous. Further the charge was so improbable that Crick's reputation was not injured.

== See also ==
- Electoral results for the district of West Macquarie
- List of New South Wales state by-elections
