= Merembra Homestead =

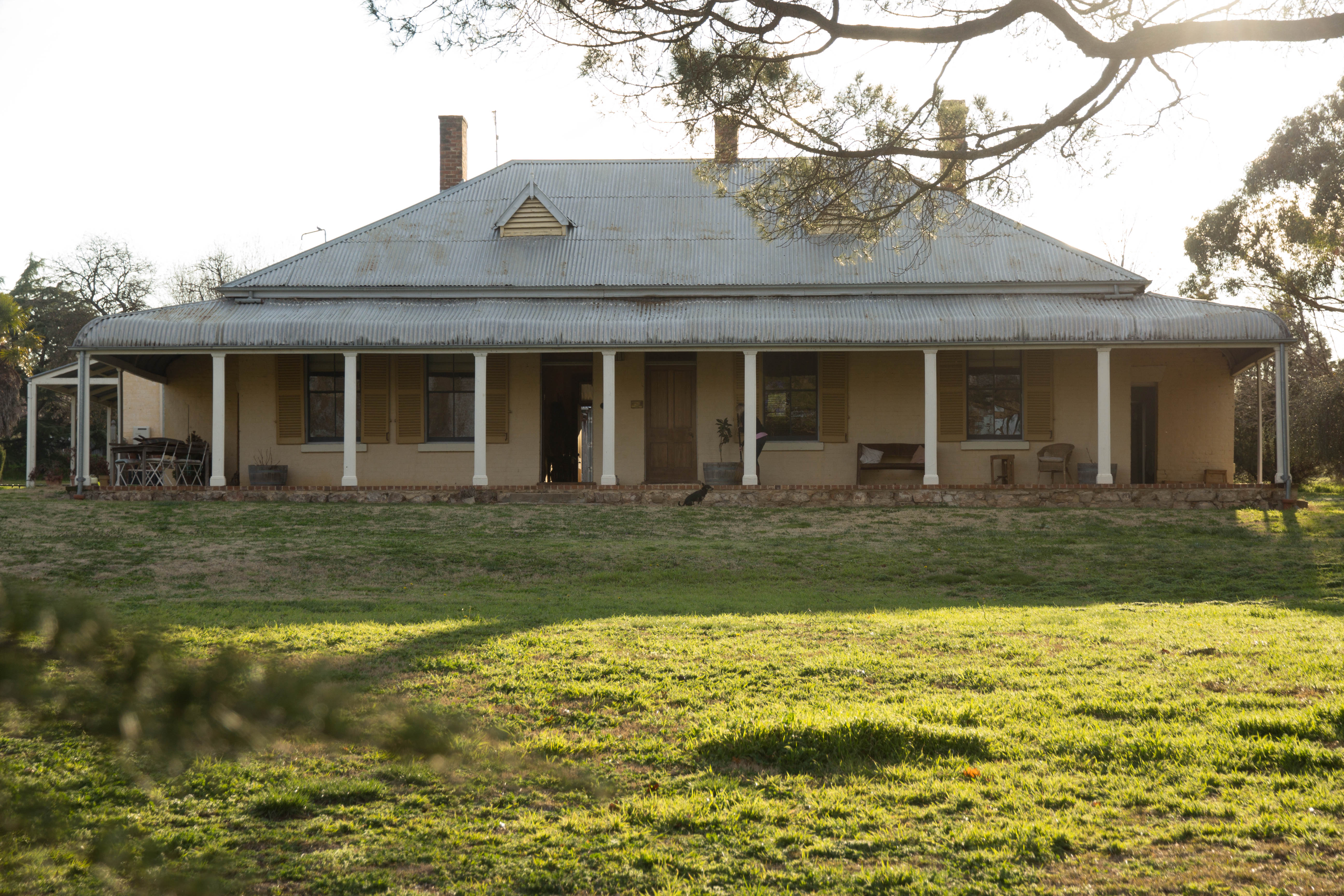
- Merembra Homestead, picture in 2018

- Location within New South Wales Location within Australia
- 33°27′02″S 149°35′20″E
- Location: 218 Gormans Hill Road, Bathurst, Bathurst Region, New South Wales, Australia

History
- Built: 1863–1864

Site notes
- Architectural style: Victorian Georgian

New South Wales Heritage Register
- Official name: Merembra Homestead; John's Farm; Barley Mow Inn
- Type: state heritage (built)
- Designated: 14 July 2000
- Reference no.: 1397
- Type: Homestead building
- Category: Residential buildings (private)
- Builders: Unknown

Merembra Homestead is a heritage-listed homestead and former inn at 218 Gormans Hill Road, Bathurst, Bathurst Region, New South Wales, Australia. It was built from 1863 to 1864. It was also known as John's Farm and Barley Mow Inn. It was added to the New South Wales State Heritage Register on 14 July 2000.

== History ==
=== Settlement at Bathurst ===
Governor Macquarie the commissioned William Cox to construct a road over the Blue Mountains in 1815. Cox's road followed the route established by the two teams of explorers. This road was completed in 1815. The constructed road followed the South or Left bank of the Macquarie River until it reached Gorman's Hill.

The final stretch of the road to Gorman's Hill travelled through Queen Charlottes Vale, between Vale Creek and the Macquarie River. The Vale Road, following the Vale Creek was also an early entrance road into Bathurst and another alternative in flooding seasons. This placed Merembra or Johns Farm in a strategic location in the development of Bathurst.

=== Baylis family ===
Private Joseph Baylis, a soldier in the NSW Corps, arrived in Australia on the "Suprize" on 26 July 1790, part of the second Fleet. He served as a guard on Norfolk Island. By 1803, he had received land grants from Governor King and became a farmer near Windsor. Joseph's wife, Ann Taylor, was convict who arrived in Sydney on the "Earl Cornwallis" in 1801 In 1806 muster she is shown as pardoned and her employer as J Bayliss. They married in 1810 and reared eight children. Their first child, Sarah, (1804–1844) later married Thomas Kite on 26 December 1820 in Castlereagh, Church of England. In the early 1820s, William (1805–1883), John (1808–1880) and Jane (b. 1813) came to Kelso, Bathurst to join and work for their sister and brother-in law Sarah and Thomas Kite. The father, Joseph, and the children also settled later in Bathurst, probably after his wife died in Windsor of accidental poisoning in December 1826.

John Baylis, applied for and received a land grant of 108 acres, No 14 Parish of Bathurst in 1830. He married Priscilla Golsby in 1832 and became a pioneering farmer, experimenting on lighter soils. There were nine children. The property was then known as "John's Farm". The promised Crown Grant of 108 acres was formalised in 1840. 'John's Farm' is where Joseph Baylis is thought to have died in 1855 so there would have been an earlier dwelling on the property. John Baylis lived on the property for 50 years.

In 1864 John mortgaged the land and house for a loan of 250 pounds from John McPhillamy, possibly to help pay for the completion of the homestead.

The present homestead was constructed c. 1864 of triple brick on a stone foundation. It is purported that bush ranger John Vane, a confederate of Ben Hall carted the foundation stones.

John and his son Henry (1844–1934) for a time kept a hotel, the "Barley Mow" at John's Farm They were active members of the Bathurst Amateur Turf Club and owned and trained horses at the farm, including the winner of the 1881 Bathurst Silver Bracelet Race. In 1867 the building was licensed as the Barley Mow Hotel for one year.

John Bayliss died in December 1880 with the cause of death given by Dr Bassett being "advanced age", at 72.

=== McPhillamy family ===
In 1815 William McPhillamy, of County Tyrone, Ireland, married Mary Scott They were both tried and sentenced at Ayr in 1816 and each received seven years' transportation. In the 1828 census William is recorded as an overseer to Robert Smith, who was a superintendent for Marsden at Bathurst. After William died, Mary married Robert Smith who prospered and bought large tracts of land. As he had no children and left his property to all but the eldest of Mary's children when he died in 1851.The youngest child was John Smith McPhillamy (1825–1887) who worked for his stepfather as a station manager. He married Maria Saphia Dargan.

In February 1881 the farm was sold to John McPhillamy at auction and the name changed to Merembra. The McPhillamy family did not live at Merembra and at this time it is not known who leased the property. John McPhillamy requested Priscilla Bayliss to convey said land to his eldest son, John McPhillamy Jr. John McPhillamy Jr (1850–1935) was born at Mt. Tamar. He became the owner of John's Farm in 1881 possibly around the time of his marriage. He and his wife had five children between 1884 and 1897. It is possible that they named Johns Farm "Blair Athol" from the 1880s, as such was referred to as the McPhillamy residence prior to the construction of the. current "Blair Athol", in Keppel Street, Bathurst in 1892.

John McPhillamy was on committees of various sporting clubs including the Turf Club, on the Board of Bathurst District Hospital and deeply interested in the AH&P; Association. In 1926, when he retired from the legal practice after 40 years he settled Mt. Tamar on John Maxwell McPhillamy, his son. He carried it on for a time before selling it to Mr. Stevenson.

In the 1920s, the brick paved verandah was covered with cement screed.

In the 1930s John's granddaughter Faith Lurline, married Walter McPhillamy of Orton Park and bought Merembra from John McPhillamy, thus returning the homestead into the ownership of the Baylis family. Faith McPhillamy took a special interest in her three nephews, as their father, her brother Victor Bayliss, had died young and they were close neighbours. Roger Bayliss, her nephew ran a dairy farm with the help of a family who were tenants.

From 1930 to 1987 the property was rented to various people including Horace Shilabeer, Worthingtons, George Ballam (1949–67), and Neville Hanrahan (1967–87). In 1957, a bath and indoor toilet was installed by the tenant.

When Faith died childless in the 1960s, Raymond Bayliss, her eldest nephew, inherited Merembra. Raymond was involved with the Bathurst District Historical Society and collated a lot of family and local historical research. In 1987 he gave the house and remaining acreage to his daughter, Diana Jamieson. Her family had no interest in using it, so the river flats were subdivided off and sold to Harry Cook, a vegetable grower. The homestead and 16 acres were sold to the Prykes thus ending the 157 year old Bayliss / McPhillamy connection to Lot 14.

In 1987 it was sold at auction to Mary and Neville Pryke and used as a workshop. Orchard and specimen trees are planted. The verandah at rear and the rear wing were re-roofed in the style of the original building.

In 1999 it was purchased by Margaret and Jim Glen.

== Description ==
Merembra is a simple Victorian Georgian farm homestead. Stone foundations, triple brick construction under a hipped iron roof with gabled vents to front. Bullnosed verandah on three sides supported by flat timber posts with simple arch profile at front and small 'stranger's' rooms at either end. Three brick chimneys on main roof and one over kitchen wing. A pair of small gabled roof vents to main elevation. Two approximately centrally placed front doors flanked by shuttered sash windows to back and front.

The building has good curtilage being located towards the front of 5 acres and retaining further 11 acres to the side. A cellar is below the house which is accessed from the rear. A large stone pine (Pinus pinea) tree dominates its front garden and lawn setting.

It was reported to be in fair physical condition as at 29 February 2000. It is substantially intact.

== Heritage listing ==
Merembra Homestead is an archetypal medium-sized Victorian farmhouse in an unspoiled rural setting which contributes significantly to its rural surroundings. It is in a highly visible position on the original Bathurst Road. Its original owners and family were foundation members of the Bathurst pastoral society with strong connections to those who were forming the infrastructure of the district. Connected to a number of important persons in Bathurst's history: Thomas Kite, John Bayliss, John Vane and John McPhillamy and families. The combination of its intactness and aesthetics together with a rich history makes it rare.

Merembra Homestead was listed on the New South Wales State Heritage Register on 14 July 2000 having satisfied the following criteria.

The place is important in demonstrating the course, or pattern, of cultural or natural history in New South Wales.

The Merembra Homestead site is associated with initial European exploration and use of Bathurst Plains. It provides and example of colonial settlement policies of the 1830s. A settlement grant was given to family of veteran NSW corps soldier, under Governor Darling, on the basis of promoting settlement of the central west and as a recognition of veteran service.

The place has a strong or special association with a person, or group of persons, of importance of cultural or natural history of New South Wales's history.

Merembra Homestead was constructed c. 1863 and is associated with the Bayliss, Kite and McPhillamy families. It is purported to be associated with the bush ranger John Vane during construction and subsequent raids.

The place is important in demonstrating aesthetic characteristics and/or a high degree of creative or technical achievement in New South Wales.

Merembra Homestead is a medium-sized Victorian Georgian farm house in a highly visible position overlooking the Macquarie River and set in an unspoilt rural setting. It contributes significantly to its rural surroundings.

The place has strong or special association with a particular community or cultural group in New South Wales for social, cultural or spiritual reasons.

Continued association with early settlement family throughout 160 years of European settlement family throughout 160 years of European use from 1830 to 1987.

Association with significant early settlers and personalities of Bathurst including:- Thomas Kite, John Bayliss and Bayliss family, John Vane, John McPhillamy and family.

Representative of successful free settlement of the Central West.

Representative of opportunities created for lower middle class colonial settlers who chose to stay in Australia after completing their term of employment rather than return to England.

History of the site reflects early settlement control policies of Governor Macquarie of providing small farm grants as rewards for good conduct and service.

The place has potential to yield information that will contribute to an understanding of the cultural or natural history of New South Wales.

Merembra Homestead retains much of its original fabric and will provide opportunities to research original bricks, colours, finishes etc. John Bayliss grew experimental crops and was first to experiment with lighter soils.

The Merembra Homestead was initially constructed as a rural Inn which is reflected in the planning of the building. The construction techniques are reflective of late Colonial / Early Victorian period, remaining intact and interpretable.

The site specific 19th century site specific early water supply system includes a well and a reservoir tank stand which still remains intact.

The place is important in demonstrating the principal characteristics of a class of cultural or natural places/environments in New South Wales.

It represents the archetypal medium-sized Victorian farm house.

== See also ==
- Australian residential architectural styles
