= 1884 West Macquarie colonial by-election =

By-election in New South Wales, Australia

A by-election for the seat of West Macquarie in the New South Wales Legislative Assembly was held on 2 July 1884 because of the resignation of Thomas Hellyer.

== Dates ==
Date	Event
17 June 1884	Thomas Hellyer resigned.
18 June 1884	Writ of election issued by the Speaker of the Legislative Assembly.
28 June 1884	Day of nomination at Perth.
2 July 1884	Polling day
8 July 1884	Return of writ

== Candidates ==
- Lewis Lloyd was a copper miner and justice of the peace who did not initially canvass the electorate and only came forward when Charles Pilcher withdrew.
- Charles Pilcher was the former member for West Macquarie before standing unsuccessfully for East Sydney in 1882. He withdrew prior to the nominations.
- William Richardson was a commission agent from Sydney who was supported by the Protection and Political Reform League and Richard Luscombe, the newly elected member for Northumberland, was active in his campaign. He had previously stood unsuccessfully for The Hastings and Manning in 1880 and The Hunter in 1882.

== Result ==
1884 West Macquarie by-election Wednesday 2 July
Candidate	Votes	%
Lewis Lloyd (elected)	375	67.2
William Richardson	183	32.8
Total formal votes	558	98.6
Informal votes	8	1.4
Turnout	566	53.9

== See also ==
- Electoral results for the district of West Macquarie
- List of New South Wales state by-elections
