= Chairman of Committees of the New South Wales Legislative Assembly =

Former deputy presiding officer of the lower house of the Parliament of New South Wales

People who have served as Chairman of Committees of the New South Wales Legislative Assembly are:

Name	Party	Term start	Term end	Term in office	Ref
Terence Murray	None	1856	1857	0–1 years	
Arthur Holroyd	None	1856	1857	0–1 years	
William Arnold	None	1858	1859	0–1 years	
William Piddington	None	1859	1860	0–1 years	
Robert Wisdom	None	1861	1864	2–3 years	
Thomas Garrett	None	1865	1869	3–4 years	
John Lackey	None	1870	1872	1–2 years	
Richard Driver	None	1872	1876	3–4 years	
James Farnell	None	1876	1877	0–1 years	
Thomas Garrett	None	1877	1878	0–1 years	
Richard Driver	None	1877	1878	0–1 years	
Angus Cameron	None	12 September 1878	7 October 1885	7 years, 25 days	
Thomas Garrett	None	1885	1886	0–1 years	
William Trickett	None	1885	1886	0–1 years	
Thomas Slattery	None	1885	1886	0–1 years	
Angus Cameron	Free Trade	16 March 1887	19 January 1889	1 year, 309 days	
Ninian Melville	Protectionist	2 April 1889	25 June 1894	5 years, 84 days	
William McCourt	Free Trade	3 August 1894	23 December 1899	5 years, 142 days	
John Cann	Labour	28 June 1900	16 July 1904	4 years, 18 days	
Paddy Crick	Progressive	22 September 1904	20 December 1904	89 days	
William Wood	Liberal Reform	28 June 1905	11 August 1907	2 years, 44 days	
John Cohen	Liberal Reform	24 October 1907	14 September 1910	2 years, 325 days	
Dick Meagher	Labor	1 December 1910	6 November 1913	2 years, 340 days	
Thomas Thrower	Labor	11 March 1914	21 February 1917	2 years, 347 days	
Ernest Durack (Acting)	Labor	18 August 1916	16 November 1916	90 days	
Daniel Levy	Nationalist	1 August 1917	18 August 1919	2 years, 17 days	
Percy Colquhoun	Nationalist	2 September 1919	18 February 1920	169 days	
Robert Stuart-Robertson	Labor	7 September 1920	17 February 1922	1 year, 163 days	
Bruce Walker	Nationalist	26 April 1922	18 April 1925	2 years, 357 days	
Robert Greig	Labor	24 June 1925	7 September 1927	2 years, 75 days	
Bruce Walker	Nationalist	8 November 1927	18 September 1930	2 years, 314 days	
Hugh Connell	Labor	26 November 1930	18 May 1932	1 year, 174 days	
William Missingham	Country	24 June 1932	1 February 1933	222 days	
William Hedges	Country	22 June 1933	18 April 1941	7 years, 300 days	
George Booth	Labor	28 May 1941	16 February 1959	17 years, 264 days	
Bob Gorman (Acting)	Labor	16 March 1949	31 March 1949	15 days	
Bob Gorman (Acting)	Labor	5 April 1949	18 May 1949	43 days	
Laurie Tully (Acting)	Labor	19 August 1952	22 November 1952	95 days	
Howard Fowles	Labor	21 April 1959	31 March 1965	5 years, 344 days	
Geoff Crawford	Country	26 May 1965	23 January 1968	2 years, 242 days	
Leon Punch	Country	26 March 1968	17 January 1973	4 years, 297 days	
Jim Brown	National Country	28 February 1973	2 April 1976	3 years, 34 days	
Harold Coates (Acting)	Independent	4 March 1975	24 April 1975	51 days	
Tom Cahill	Labor	25 May 1976	23 June 1983	7 years, 29 days	
Barry Wilde	Labor	17 August 1983	5 March 1984	201 days	
Ernie Quinn (Acting)	Labor	5 March 1981	22 February 1984	2 years, 354 days	
Richard Face	Labor	1 May 1984	22 February 1988	3 years, 297 days	
Robert Webster	National	27 April 1988	24 January 1989	272 days	
Wendy Machin	National	21 February 1989	26 May 1993	4 years, 94 days	
John Turner	National	7 September 1993	3 March 1995	1 year, 177 days	
John Price	Labor	2 May 1995	27 March 1999	3 years, 329 days	
Mick Clough (Acting)	Labor	7 May 1997	24 May 1997	17 days	
John Mills	Labor	11 May 1999	2 March 2007	7 years, 295 days	
