= Doris Beeby =

Australian union organiser (1894–1948)

Doris I. Beeby
- Born: Doris Isabel Beeby; 30 July 1894; Stanmore, New South Wales, Australia
- Died: 17 October 1948 (aged 54); Castlecrag, New South Wales
- Occupation: Union organiser

Doris Isabel Beeby (1894–1948) was an Australian union organiser. She organised on behalf of women in the Sheet Metal Workers' Union during World War II. She advocated for pay equity and better working conditions. She assisted Spanish Civil War refugees through the Spanish Relief Movement and joined the Communist Party of Australia. In the 1920s, she was an assistant to and associate of her father, judge George Beeby and conducted inquiries into working conditions.

== Early life, education and career ==
Doris Isabel Beeby was born on 30 July 1894 in Stanmore. She was one of four children of Helena Maria (née West) and George Beeby, a politician and judge. She attended the Sydney Church of England Grammar School for Girls and was an art student at the University of Sydney.

In September 1920, after Beeby's father was appointed judge of the industrial arbitration court of New South Wales, she became his associate. She assisted in an inquiry into reducing hours for workers in the building and iron industries to 44 hours per week from 48. In 1926, she joined him when he moved to the Commonwealth Arbitration Court and served as secretary to the 1931 royal commission inquiring into the 1928 prosecution of J. Johnston.

In late 1935, Beeby travelled with her family by motorcar through Europe and went to England. She visited her sister in New York before returning to Australia in March 1937.

== Union organising and Communist Party ==
In March 1939, Beeby travelled to London where she assisted Spanish Civil War refugees through the Spanish Relief Movement. She joined the Communist Party of Great Britain. Upon returning to Australia she became a member of the Communist Party of Australia.

Beeby became a union organiser, working for the Sheet Metal Workers' Union (SMWU) from 1942 to 1945. She took a position working in the sheet metal factory to better understand the perspective of the workers. She advocated for pay equity for women and better working conditions before the Women's Employment Board. Her organising success was limited due to the Communist Party's unwillingness to engage in strikes and general support for the war effort. Beeby wrote for the monthly Australian Women's Digest and the official Communist Party newspaper Tribune. She wrote articles about the role of women in trade unions during the war and about wage gains for women.

As the war came to an end, most of the women sheet metal workers left their positions. Two months after the end of the war, Beeby resigned from her position as a union organiser with SMWU.

Beeby worked with the United Associations of Women, supporting the Australian Women's Charter and the Women for Canberra Movement. She was secretary of the Medical Aid to Indonesia Committee. She was the speaker at the 1948 International Women's Day festival in Newcastle where she encouraged women to join unions and emphasised the need for child care.

== Death and spying allegations ==
Beeby died of cancer in Castlecrag on 17 October 1948. She enjoyed motoring and contract bridge.

After her death, she was mentioned in connection with Soviet espionage. In 1955, Dorothy Jordan Throssell, wife of diplomat Ric Throssell, was suspected of passing Beeby information from the Department of External Affairs. It was claimed that Walter Seddon Clayton collected material from Beeby and that she had coordinated the passing of classified documents to the Soviet embassy.
