= Fergus Smith =

Australian politician

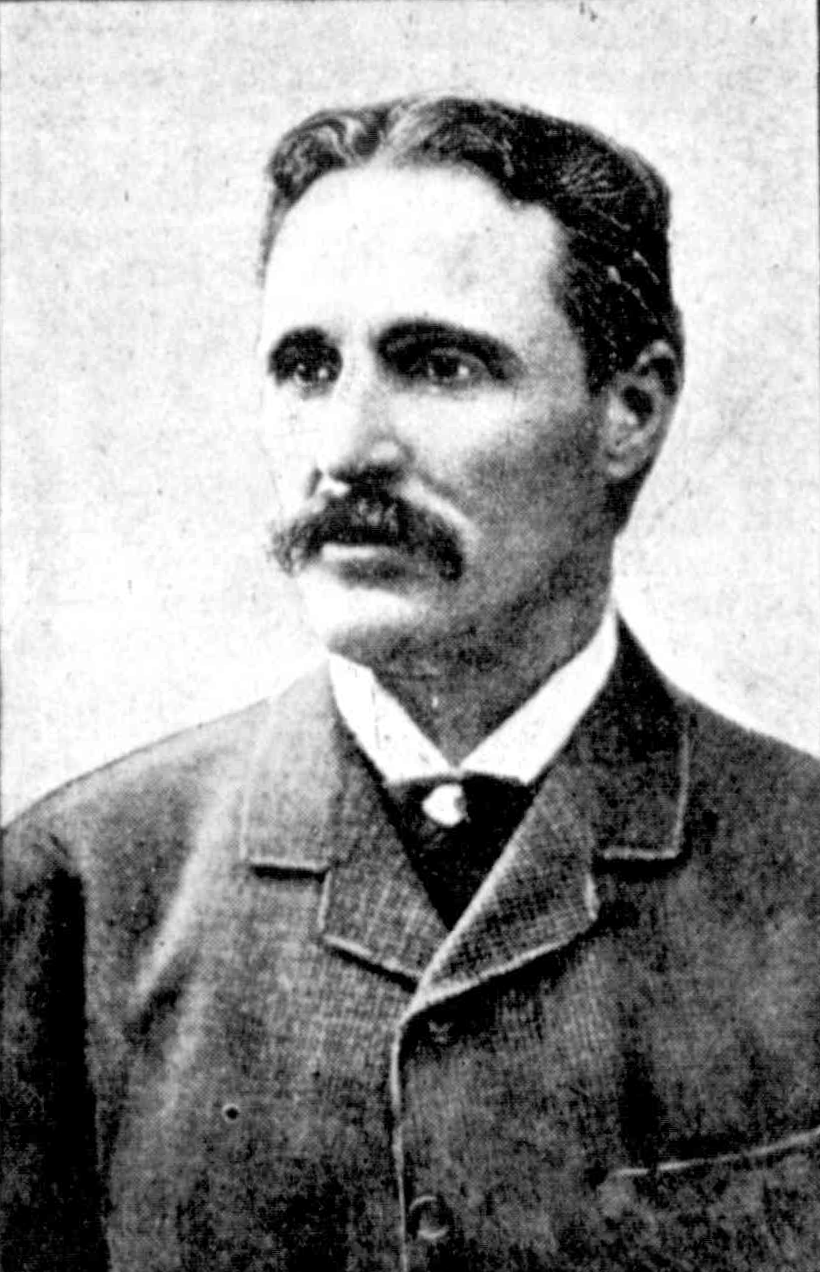

Fergus Jago Smith (8 June 1843 – 25 January 1924) was an Australian politician and pastoralist.

== Early life ==
He was born at Gulgong to John Smith, a chemistry professor and later politician, and Mary née Tom, (Note: Different locations are given for his place of birth, with his parliamentary biography and Obituaries Australia entry listing it as Gulgong, while his obituary in The Sydney Morning Herald gives it as Molong.) the eldest of 11 children. He attended The King's School in Parramatta, and after a world tour worked on his father's station at Molong and then on another station near Bathurst which he later owned.

== Political career ==
In 1887 he was elected to the New South Wales Legislative Assembly as the Free Trade member for West Macquarie. He did not re-contest in 1889. In 1895 he was appointed to the New South Wales Legislative Council, where he remained until his death. He was a brother-in-law to fellow politicians Charles Barton and Sir Joseph Innes.

== Personal life ==
Smith married Emily Grace Machattie on 25 January 1866. They had no children, but adopted a daughter, Violet Kathleen Marion, who married Lieutenant-Colonel Chetwynd Rokeby Alfred Bond, who served in the Indian Staff Corps. Smith died at Bathurst on 25 January 1924 (aged 80), and his estate was valued at £76,810.

== Notes ==
New South Wales Legislative Assembly
Preceded by Lewis Lloyd	Member for West Macquarie; 1887–1889	Succeeded by Paddy Crick
