= Victor Beeby =

New Zealand cricketer

Personal information
- Full name: Victor Spearman Beeby
- Born: 30 September 1891; Dunedin, New Zealand
- Died: 7 February 1944 (aged 52); Wellington, New Zealand
- Height: 5 ft 6 in (1.68 m)

Domestic team information
- Years: Team
- 1919/20: Otago
- FC debut: 25 December 1919 Otago v Southland
- Last FC: 1 January 1920 Otago v Wellington
- Source: ESPNcricinfo, 5 May 2016

Victor Spearman Beeby (30 September 1891 – 7 February 1944) was a New Zealand cricketer. He played two first-class matches for Otago in 1919/20.

== Life and career ==
Beeby was born in Dunedin. A linotype operator, he was living in Aratapu, near Dargaville in Northland, when he enlisted in January 1918 and served as a private in the New Zealand Expeditionary Force in World War One. Arriving in Europe at the beginning of October 1918, just before the end of the war, Beeby did not serve at the front during the war.

Beeby and his wife moved back to Dunedin after the war. Playing for Otago, he took four wickets at an average of 18.00 and made 37 runs at an average of 37.00 in his two first-class matches, both of which Otago won. He also played soccer as a goalkeeper for the Maori Hill club in Dunedin, and represented Otago.

In late 1924 Beeby had left his wife in Dunedin and was living in Auckland. He was given a six-month prison sentence for failure to maintain his wife, suspended on the condition that he resume maintenance payments and pay off the arrears. In May 1932, during a period of unrest among the unemployed, he was convicted for his part in a riot outside Parliament House, Wellington, and sentenced to three months in prison "for inciting lawlessness".

He died at Wellington in 1944 aged 52.
