= John McPhillamy =

Politician and pastoralist in New South Wales, Australia

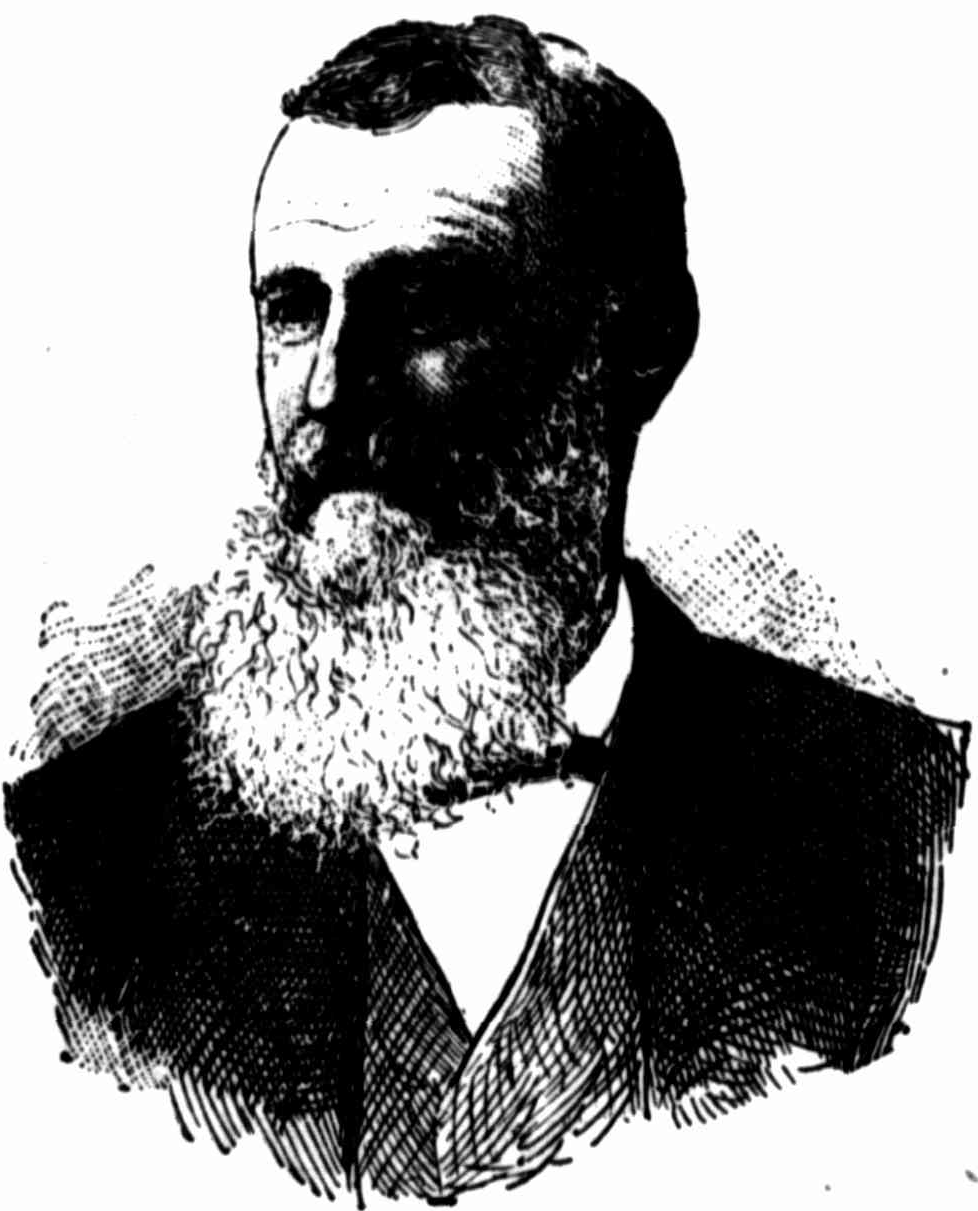

John McPhillamy (15 September 1825 – 18 July 1887) was an Australian politician and pastoralist.

He was born was on 15 September 1825 at Windsor to convicts William McPhillamy and Mary Scott. He worked on his stepfather's property at Mount Tamar near Bathurst, becoming station manager and eventually inheriting. On 5 March 1849 he married Maria Sophia Dargan, with whom he had seven children. By the 1850s he held a further 68,000 acres in the Lachlan River district. In 1859 he was elected to the New South Wales Legislative Assembly for West Macquarie, but he resigned six months later. He continued to expand as a pastoralist, notably in the Wellington district.

McPhillamy died at Mount Tamar on 18 July 1887 (aged 61). He was survived by four sons and three daughters. He left an estate valued for probate at over £80,000.

New South Wales Legislative Assembly
New seat	Member for West Macquarie; 1859	Succeeded by Henry Mort
