= Electoral district of West Macquarie =

Former state electoral district of New South Wales, Australia

West Macquarie was an electoral district of the Legislative Assembly in the Australian state of New South Wales between 1859 and 1904, in the Bathurst region, named after the Macquarie River, being the western side of the river to the south of the town of Bathurst. It was abolished in 1904 due to the re-distribution of electorates following the 1903 New South Wales referendum, which required the number of members of the Legislative Assembly to be reduced from 125 to 90. It was largely replaced by the new district of Blayney, which also absorbed parts of Hartley and The Macquarie. The rest of the district was absorbed by Yass.

== Members for West Macquarie ==
Member	Party	Term
John McPhillamy	None	1859–1859
Henry Mort	None	1859–1860
Richard Driver	None	1860–1869
Edmund Webb	None	1869–1874
Charles Pilcher	None	1875–1882
Thomas Hellyer	None	1882–1884
Lewis Lloyd	None	1884–1887
Fergus Smith	Free Trade	1887–1889
Paddy Crick	Protectionist	1889–1901
Paddy Crick	Progressive	1901–1904

== Election results ==
1901 New South Wales state election: West Macquarie
Party	Candidate	Votes	%	±%
Progressive	Paddy Crick	1,152	59.2	+3.6
Liberal Reform	Otto Jaeger	795	40.8	−2.3
Total formal votes		1,947	99.0	+0.8
Informal votes		19	1.0	−0.8
Turnout		1,966	52.6	−4.7
Progressive hold				
