= Electoral district of Belubula =

Former state electoral district of New South Wales, Australia

Belubula was an electoral district of the Legislative Assembly in the Australian state of New South Wales from 1904 to 1913. The electorate included much of the modern Cabonne Council and Cowra Shire and was named after the Belubula River, which flows through the town of Canowindra. In 1913 it was largely absorbed into Lyndhurst.

In 1904, it consisted of booths at Burnt Yards, Back Creek, Barragun, Belpage, Bowan Park, Canowindra, Carcoar, Cowra, Cowra-Goolagong Road, Cowra-Canowindra Road, Cargo, Cudal, Coffee Hills, Cave Creek, Cadia, Darby Falls, Eugowra, Forest Reefs, Gully Swamp, Holmwood, Lumpy Swamp, Lyndhurst, Lockwood, Mandurama, Merriganowery, Morongola Creek, Mount Macdonald, Murga, Nyrang Creek, Toogong, Wolli, Woodstock, Wattamandara, Warrangong and Westville.

It was first contested at the 1904 election, when it was won by Thomas Waddell, the former member for the abolished Cowra seat, who defeated Thomas Rose, former member for the abolished Argyle seat. He held it until the seat's abolition in 1913, during which time he switched from the Progressive Party to the Liberal Reform Party. Waddell subsequently won the new seat of Lyndhurst in 1913 following Belubula's abolition.

== Members for Belubula ==
Member	Party	Term
Thomas Waddell	Progressive	1904–1907
Thomas Waddell	Liberal Reform	1907–1913
