= George Beeby =

Australian politician

The Honourable Sir George Beeby KBE
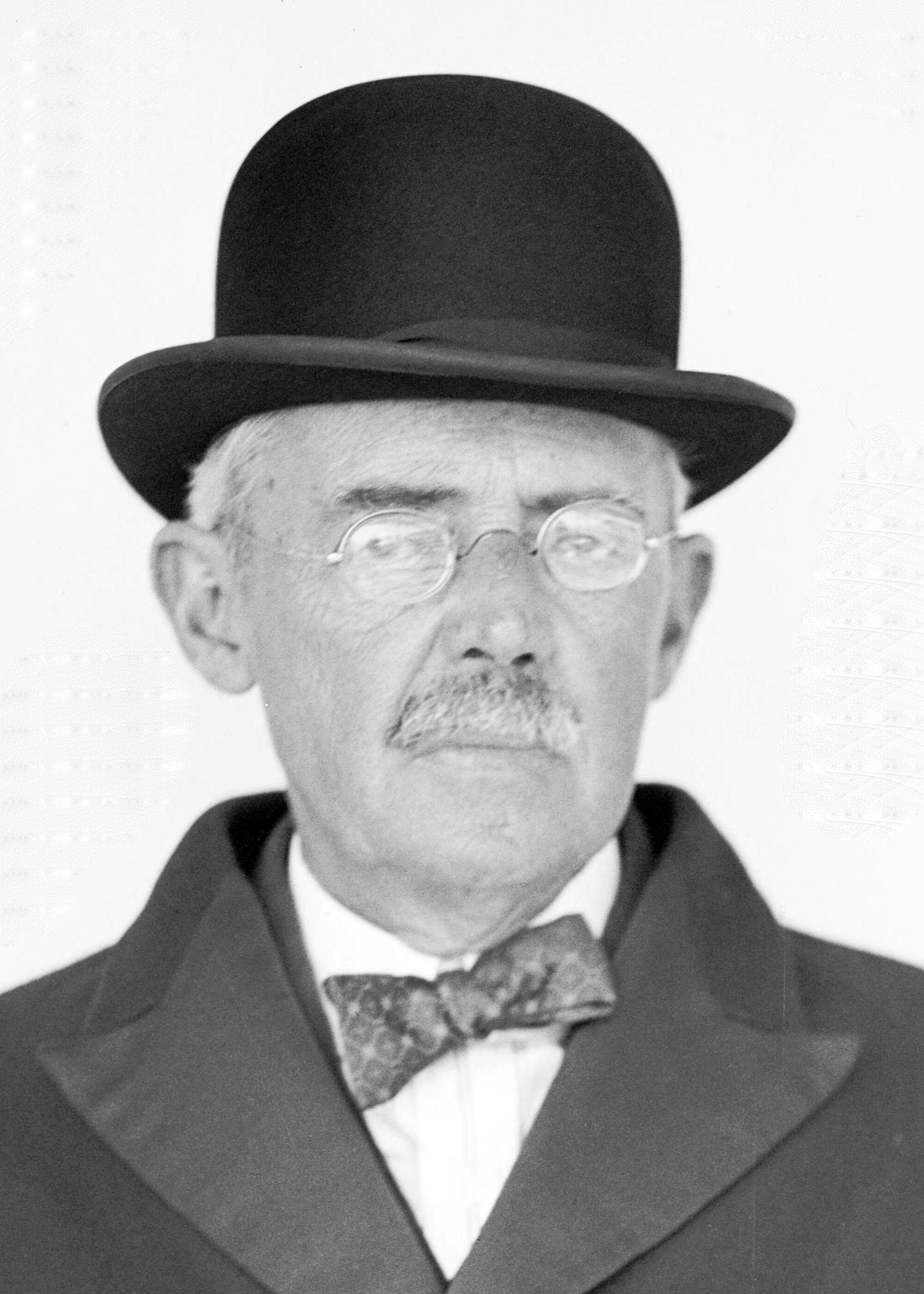

Chief Judge of the Commonwealth Court of Conciliation and Arbitration
- In office 15 March 1939 – 31 July 1941
- Preceded by: George Dethridge
- Succeeded by: Harold Piper

Judge of the Commonwealth Court of Conciliation and Arbitration
- In office 21 July 1926 – 15 March 1939
- Succeeded by: Thomas O'Mara

Member of the New South Wales Legislative Assembly for Murray
- In office 20 March 1920 – 9 August 1920
- Succeeded by: Matthew Kilpatrick

Member of the New South Wales Legislative Assembly for Wagga
- In office 24 March 1917 – 20 March 1920
- Preceded by: Walter Boston

Member of the New South Wales Legislative Council
- In office 16 November 1916 – 26 February 1917

Member of the New South Wales Legislative Assembly for Blayney
- In office 10 September 1907 – 9 December 1912; 23 January 1913 – 6 November 1913
- Preceded by: John Withington

Personal details
- Born: 23 May 1869 Alexandria, New South Wales, Australia
- Died: 18 July 1942 (aged 73) Killara, New South Wales, Australia
- Party: Labor (until 1912); Independent (1912–1913); Nationalist (1916–1919); Progressive (1920)
- Spouse: Helena West (m. 1892)
- Children: 4, including Doris Beeby

Sir George Stephenson Beeby KBE (23 May 1869 – 18 July 1942) was an Australian politician, judge and author. He was one of the founders of the Labor Party in New South Wales, and represented the party in state parliament from 1907 to 1912. He fell out with the party and later served as an independent, a Nationalist, and a Progressive. He left parliament in 1920 to join the state arbitration court, and in 1926 was appointed to the Commonwealth Court of Conciliation and Arbitration. He was Chief Judge from 1939 until his retirement in 1941.

== Early life ==
Beeby was born in Alexandria, Sydney, the second son of English-born Edward Augustus Beeby, a book-keeper, and his wife Isabel, née Thompson. Beeby was educated at Crown Street Public School and became a pupil teacher at Macdonald Town (Erskineville) Public School when he was 14. He stood as a Labor candidate at the 1894 election for Armidale, but finished 3rd with a margin of 188 votes (8.8%).

Beeby found work as a journalist and solicitor. He stood as the Labour candidate at the 1904 election for Leichhardt, but again finished 3rd. Beeby stood as a Labor candidate for Blayney at the by-election in January 1907 due to the resignation of W. P. (Paddy) Crick, but Beeby was defeated by 23 votes.

== Parliamentary career ==
Beeby won the seat of Blayney for the Labor Party at the 1907 election. Beeby was appointed Minister of Public Instruction and Minister for Labour and Industry from 21 October 1910 until 10 September 1911. There was a re-shuffle following protests at legislation on land ownership and Beeby was appointed Secretary for Lands, adding the portfolio of Labour and Industry in November 1911. In December 1912 he resigned from the ministry, parliament and Labor party in protest at the power of the extra-parliamentary Labor Party executive. He was re-elected for Blayney as an independent after a close fought by-election on 23 January 1913, with a margin of 136 votes (3.2%). Prior to the 1913 state election, he created the National Progressive Party and ran a slate of 10 candidates. Only he polled over 10 percent of the vote, winning 19.5 percent in the seat of Waverley. His voters helped elected a Labor candidate in the second round. He subsequently announced that his party had failed and there was no room for a third party in New South Wales.

He joined the Progressive Party in 1920, with the introduction of proportional representation and was elected as the member for Murray, with the party winning 15 seats.

== Judge ==
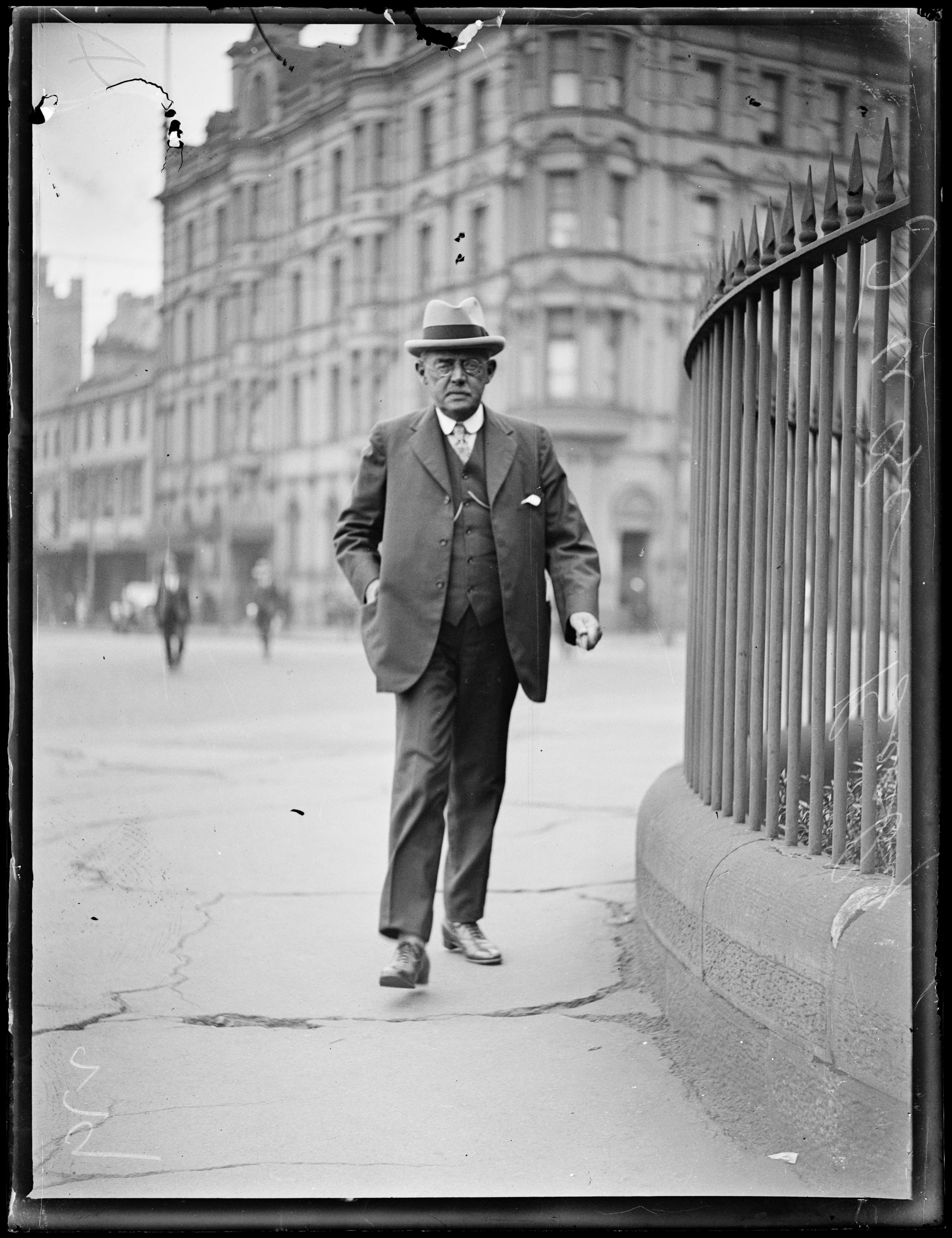
Beeby walking in Sydney in 1927

In August 1920, Beeby resigned from parliament to be appointed a judge of the New South Wales arbitration court. In 1926 he became a member of the Commonwealth Court of Conciliation and Arbitration bench. In the same year Beeby imposed an award favourable to the Federal Government's industrial policy which the Waterside Workers' Federation rejected. This resulted in strike action and later violence. Beeby was appointed chief judge in March 1939 and was knighted in the same year.

== Late life and family ==
Beeby married in 1892 and had multiple children. One daughter, Doris Isobel Beeby (1894–1948), was a communist party member and sought higher women's wages. His son, Edward Augustus (1892–1984), was (among other things) a musician and playwright. Edward opened the Patch Theatre Company in Perth WA in 1939.

George Beeby retired in 1941 and died on 18 July 1942.

== Publications ==
Beeby was the author of

- Three Years of Industrial Arbitration in New South Wales (1906)
- Concerning Ordinary People (1923)
- In Quest of Pan (1924)
- A Loaded Legacy (1930).

=== Works ===
- Dregs.
- In Quest of Pan.
- One Touch O' Nature.
- Potter and Clay
- Still Waters.
- The Banner.
- The Creative Urge.
- The Point of View.
- Merely Margaret.

Parliament of New South Wales
Political offices
Preceded by James Hogue	Minister of Public Instruction; Minister for Labour and Industry; 1910 – 1911	Succeeded by Campbell Carmichael
Preceded by Fred Flowers	Secretary for Lands; 1911 – 1912	Succeeded by John Treflé
Preceded by Campbell Carmichael	Minister for Labour and Industry; 1911 – 1912	Succeeded by Campbell Carmichael
Preceded by Henry Hoyle	Minister for Labour and Industry; 1916 – 1920	Succeeded by Augustus James
New South Wales Legislative Assembly
Preceded by John Withington	Member for Blayney; 1907–1913	District abolished
Preceded by Walter Boston	Member for Wagga Wagga; 1917–1920	District abolished
Preceded by Brian Doe	Member for Murray; 1920; With: Richard Ball; William O'Brien	Succeeded by Matthew Kilpatrick
