= Paddy Crick =

Australian politician (1862–1908)

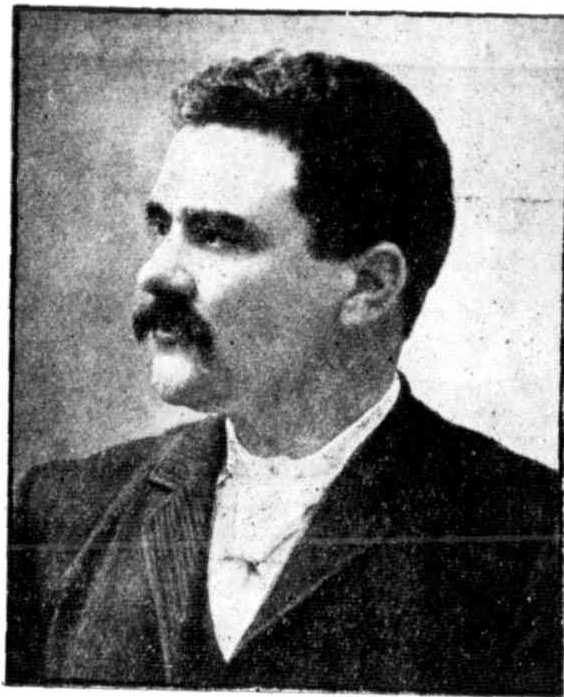

Member of the New South Wales Parliament for West Macquarie
- In office 1887–1904
- Preceded by: Fergus Smith
- Succeeded by: Abolished

Member of the New South Wales Parliament for Blayney
- In office 1904–1906
- Preceded by: New seat
- Succeeded by: John Withington

Personal details
- Born: William Patrick Crick; 10 February 1862 Truro, South Australia
- Died: 23 August 1908 (aged 46) Randwick, New South Wales, Australia
- Resting place: Waverley Cemetery

William Patrick Crick (10 February 1862 – 23 August 1908) was an Australian politician, solicitor and newspaper proprietor. He was described by author Cyril Pearl as an irresistible demagogue, who "looked like a prize fighter, dressed like a tramp, talked like a bullocky, and to complete the pattern of popular virtues, owned champion horses which he backed heavily and recklessly." William Willis, a political collaborator, described him as a "conservative dressed in the garments of democracy [with an] unbridled ambition and craving for public notice"

== Early life ==
Crick was born at Truro, South Australia and in about 1868 the family moved into western New South Wales, settling at Spicer's Creek near Wellington. He attended St Stanislaus' College, Bathurst. He was admitted as a solicitor in 1886 and developed a successful practice in the criminal courts. In 1890 he married Mary Catherine Kelly, but they separated in 1892.

== Political career ==
In 1885 Crick and Edward O'Sullivan founded the Land and Industrial Alliance, a protectionist party aimed at country selectors and city workers, and ran unsuccessfully for election to the New South Wales Legislative Assembly in 1887. As an independent protectionist he was elected in 1889 as the member for West Macquarie, aged 27 years, 6 days.

He was notable for his verbal aggression in the house, especially when drunk, and in October 1889 he called several parliamentarians "bloody Orange hounds and thieves" and William McMillan moved a motion that "That Mr. Crick, the hon. member for West Macquarie, is guilty of having wilfully and vexatiously interrupted tho committee in the orderly conduct of the business of the House, wherefore this House adjudges him guilty of contempt of the House". The motion was passed by the Assembly and Crick stated "If any hon. member thought he was going to apologise to the Government he was making a great mistake. ... he would sooner be kicked out of the House on what he considered a looting of the Treasury than remain a member of it". Crick then walked out of the house.

== 1890 expulsion ==
On 12 November 1890 there was a debate involving McMillan when Crick interjected, with McMillan stating to Crick "You are nobody", with Crick responding in kind and describing McMillan as a makeshift. Ninian Melville, the Chairman of Committees called on McMillan to withdraw the expression and he did so. The Chairman then asked Crick to withdraw his expression. Crick debated the matter with the Chairman before withdrawing it. The Chairman then repeatedly asked Crick to apologise for interjecting during proceedings and he refused to do so until after McMillan had apologised for the insult. The Chairman instructed the serjeant-at-arms, Laurence Harnett, to remove Crick, who resisted stating "Don't you handle me. I will not be bullied by Melville or any one else. I will not go out, and I say so point-blank". Crick was then physically removed by the serjeant-at-arms and attendants. The disturbance was reported to the Speaker, Joseph Abbott, who directed that Crick be allowed into the chamber to provide his explanation. Crick argued with Speaker stating "I am certainly not going to allow the Chair to knock me into a sort of pulverised sausage". Crick continued to argue with the Speaker who then instructed the serjeant-at-arms to again remove Crick. Whilst he was being forcibly removed, Crick stated "you got £2,000 for putting the Broken Hill Water Supply Bill through. That is what I tell you; and I tell the Chairman of Committees that he got £1,000; and I tell you you are both a pair of thieves and robbers of the country". Sir Henry Parkes moved that Crick be expelled for his disorderly conduct before the committee.

After debate had commenced on the motion, Crick attempted to resign with his letter stating "Mr Speaker, I consider Parliament rotten and corrupt. You put me out to-night, fearing my tongue and consequent exposure. I resign my seat, and intend to appeal to my constituents against a rotten and corrupt parliament, in which freedom of speech is brutally stifled and suppressed in order to cover up crime". In the debate various euphemisms were put as to the extent of Crick's consumption of alcohol, including that he was not in a fit condition to be heard, was slightly excited, having just returned from the Melbourne Cup, where "joviality ... reigned triumphant ... where Bacchus is the chief god". Alexander Hutchison stated that "it was worse than useless to ask a drunken man to come into an assemblage of gentlemen to make an explanation of his conduct". Crick's resignation was not treated as effective and he was expelled.

Crick repeated his accusations of corruption in his campaign speeches, and was re-elected in the resulting by-election, with a slightly increased margin.

At a meeting at the Lagoon, Major Butler asked "Is it true, Mr. Crick, that you stated that there was not a virtuous woman in West Macquarie?" Crick alleged he then stated "I was told so; and, more than that, I believe that you did say so". Crick sued Butler for slander, however the jury found for Butler. The Full Court of the Supreme Court held that a question put bona fide by an elector in the course of an election meeting would not be slanderous. Further the charge was so improbable that Crick's reputation was not injured.

== Ministerial positions ==
In August 1890 Crick was involved with William Nicholas Willis in founding the Truth newspaper, which was intended to promote their political and social views, but instead became largely a scandal sheet. He succeeded in having enacted a first offenders' probation bill in 1894. He was charged with conspiracy in 1895 in relation to the George Dean case, but managed to evade conviction. By the mid-1890s he was said to be one of the biggest betters on Sydney horse racing and lived in hotels near Randwick Racecourse.

Nevertheless, as a master parliamentary tactician, he had become a leading member of the Protectionist Party and having helped defeat the Free Trade government in 1899, was rewarded with the position of Postmaster-General in the Lyne government from 14 September 1899, a position he held until 28 February 1901.

Crick was Secretary for Lands from April 1901 to June 1904. He was elected as member for Blayney on the abolition of West Macquarie in 1904. He expected to become Premier when John See resigned and See recommended him for the position but Governor Sir Harry Rawson refused to appoint Crick because of his excessive drinking in Executive Council meetings, and in due course asked Thomas Waddell to be Premier.

== 1906 expulsion ==
In 1905 Justice William Owen was appointed a Royal Commissioner to investigate the administration of the Lands Department. The Royal Commission handed down an interim report in May 1906, which found that Crick had overruled departmental advice on 35 occasions when granting leases to pastoralists in the Western Division, that 50% of the sums received by a land agent Peter Close were paid to Crick whilst he was Minister for Lands and that Crick was corrupt. The Legislative Assembly proposed to immediately deal with Crick, however the Speaker ruled that the Assembly could not deal with the matter as it might prejudice his criminal trial. Instead the assembly amended its standing orders and suspended Crick pending the outcome of his criminal trial. The jury was unable to reach a unanimous verdict. and the Attorney General declined to prosecute the matter again as evidence before the Royal Commission had been ruled inadmissible in his criminal trial. Crick then submitted his resignation from parliament, however before it was accepted the assembly passed a motion that he was guilty of conduct that rendered him ineligible to sit as a member. Rutledge and Nairn stated this was due to old scores being paid off, while Anne Twomey stated that this motion was passed to influence future voters not to vote for Crick. In any event Crick did not nominate for the by-election.

The Full Court of the Supreme Court found that the evidence before the Royal Commission showed that Crick was not a fit and proper person to be a solicitor and he was struck off the roll on 23 August 1907. He challenged the validity of his suspension in the Supreme Court and was successful before the Full Court, however this was overturned on appeal to the Privy Council which held that the Legislative Assembly was the sole judge whether an "occasion" had arisen that affected the orderly conduct of the Assembly.

== Subsequent life and death ==
Crick stood for parliament again at the September 1907 election for Surry Hills but was unsuccessful.

Although he had reportedly been going to quit smoking and drinking in 1903, Crick suffered increasingly from cirrhosis of the liver and died of hematemesis at the Sydney suburb of Randwick. Crick was buried at Waverley Cemetery on 25 August 1908.

Parliament of New South Wales
Political offices
Preceded by Varney Parkes	Postmaster-General; 1899 – 1901	Abolished due to Federation
Preceded by Thomas Hassall	Secretary for Lands; 1901 – 1904	Succeeded by Edward O'Sullivan
New South Wales Legislative Assembly
Preceded by Fergus Smith	Member for West Macquarie; 1889 – 1904	District abolished
New district	Member for Blayney; 1904 – 1906	Succeeded by John Withington
