= Electoral district of Blayney =

Former state electoral district of New South Wales, Australia

Blayney was an electoral district of the Legislative Assembly in the Australian state of New South Wales, created in 1904 re-distribution of electorates following the 1903 New South Wales referendum, which required the number of members of the Legislative Assembly to be reduced from 125 to 90. It consisted of parts of Hartley, The Macquarie and the abolished seat of West Macquarie, and named after and including Blayney. It was abolished in 1913 and partly replaced by Lyndhurst.

== Members for Blayney ==
Member	Party	Period
Paddy Crick	Progressive	1904–1906
John Withington	Liberal Reform	1907–1907
George Beeby	Labor	1907–1912
George Beeby	Independent	1913
George Beeby	National Progressive	1913
