= John Withington =

Australian politician

John Swann Withington (12 October 1865 – 5 May 1944) was an Australian politician.

He was born in Bury in Lancashire to tailor Henry Withington and Elizabeth Mather. He received a secondary education but ran away to sea, arriving in Sydney in 1883. He moved to Orange, where he worked as a mason and later as a fuel, line and cement merchant. On 26 December 1891 he married Selina Cox, with whom he had two children. He was an alderman at Orange from 1905 to 1910, serving as mayor from 1909 to 1910. In 1907 he was elected in a by-election to the New South Wales Legislative Assembly seat of Blayney, representing the Liberal Party; he was defeated in the general election later that year. He moved to Sydney around 1920 and was an alderman at Ryde from 1927 to 1931 and from 1935 to 1937. Withington died in Sydney in 1944.

New South Wales Legislative Assembly
Preceded by Paddy Crick	Member for Blayney; 1907	Succeeded by George Beeby
