= Progressive Party (1901) =

- Leader: John See; Thomas Waddell
- Founded: 1887
- Dissolved: 1907
- Preceded by: Protectionist Party (NSW)
- Headquarters: Sydney
- Ideology: Protectionism; Social liberalism
- National affiliation: Protectionist Party
- Legislative Assembly: 42 / 125 (1901−1904)

The Progressive Party, earlier known as the Protectionist Party and the National Federal Party, was an Australian political party, active in New South Wales state politics. The question of tariff policy which, had created and divided the Free Trade Party and Protectionist Party in New South Wales in the 1890s, became a federal issue at the time of federation. Deprived of their main ideological difference, the two parties were recreated as the Liberal Reform Party aligned with the federal Free Trade Party and the Progressive Party aligned with the federal Protectionist Party.

== History ==
=== Pre-Federation ===
The Protectionist Party was formed in January 1887 to contest the following month's general election, with a central council established to assist opposition leader George Dibbs and his supporters. The Protectionist Party and its counterpart the Free Trade Party coalesced around the same time in response to the "fiscal question" of whether the colony should pursue a high-tariff policy of protectionism or a low-tariff policy of free trade.

An earlier Protection and Political Reform League (PPRL) had been established in 1881 as an extra-parliamentary lobbying group. The National Club in Sydney also served to coordinate fundraising efforts for the party at the 1889 election, with its political committee including members of parliament and leading manufacturers, pastoralists and merchants. In October 1889, a conference between the PPRL, the National Club and members of the parliamentary party agreed to establish the National Protection Association (NPA). The conference defined a platform for the NPA which included protection of city and country industries, electoral reform, agricultural reform and rural development. However the NPA was never officially established and another conference in April 1890 also failed to unite the Protectionist organisations, largely due to the non-cooperation of the PPRL.

In parliament, Dibbs and the Protectionists formed government after the 1891 election. The party split over the issue of federation in the early 1890s, which Dibbs initially opposed, and also over the question of cooperation with the labour movement prior to the formation of the Labor Electoral League in 1891.

=== Post-Federation ===
Following federation in 1901, Lyne transitioned to the new federal parliament. He was succeeded as premier by John See in March 1901. The party renamed itself the Progressive Party in May 1901. With federation accomplished and the fiscal debate moved to the federal sphere, See sought to position the Progressives as a non-ideological and pragmatic party of good government. At the 1901 state election, the party stood official candidates in only 57 out of 125 electorates, although many supporters of the government stood as unendorsed independents.

There was a rapid decline in the parliamentary representation of the party, from a high of 42 seats at the 1901 election, to 16 at the 1904 election. In April and May 1907, the party had negotiated a coalition agreement with the Liberal Reform Party but this was rejected by a vote of parliamentary members. The party leader Thomas Waddell resigned and joined the Liberal Reform Party, and was followed by John McFarlane, Brinsley Hall, John Gillies and John Perry. Of the remaining ten former Progressive Party members, a further five lost their seats at the 1907 election,

In 1919, the Farmers' and Settlers' Association and the Graziers' Association founded a new Progressive Party, which, while not a direct successor, included members of the former party such as George Briner and Walter Bennett. The new party won metropolitan and rural seats in the 1920 election and was a forerunner to the Country Party.

== Leaders ==
#	Leader	Term start	Term end	Time in office	Premier
1	John See	28 March 1901	14 June 1904	3 years, 78 days	Yes (1901–04)
2	Thomas Waddell	15 June 1904	9 May 1907	2 years, 328 days	Yes (1904)

== State election results ==
Election	Seats won	±	Total votes	%	Position	Leader
1901	42 / 125	▼10	44,817	22.9%	Minority government	John See
1904	16 / 90	▼26	75,297	18.9%	Third party	Thomas Waddell
1907	5 / 90	▼11	21,759	4.7%	Third party	

== Sources ==
- Loveday, Peter; Martin, A. W.; Weller, Patrick (1977). "New South Wales". In Peter Loveday; A. W. Martin; R. S. Parker (eds.). The Emergence of the Australian Party System. Hale & Iremonger. ISBN 0908094035.
- Hogan, Michael; Clune, David, eds. (2001). The People's Choice: Electoral Politics in 20th Century New South Wales, Volume One 1901-1927. Parliament of New South Wales and University of Sydney. ISBN 0909907390.
