= Candidates of the 1904 New South Wales state election =

The 1904 New South Wales state election was held on 6 August 1904. It involved 90 electoral districts returning one member each, a reduction from 125 to 90. (Note: Leichhardt was the only district that was not substantially changed, while The Macquarie and The Murray districts retained nothing but the name.) Women were given the right to vote for the first time in New South Wales elections, almost doubling the number of enrolled voters. As a result, it is not possible to tell the notional holder of a seat prior to the election.

== Retiring members ==
Orange Liberal MLA Harry Newman died on 1 June. Deniliquin Independent MLA Joseph Evans died on 5 July. Due to the proximity of the election, no by-elections were held.

=== Progressive ===
- Albert Chapman MLA (Braidwood)
- William Davis MLA (Bourke)
- James Gormly MLA (Wagga Wagga) — appointed to the Legislative Council.
- James Hayes MLA (Murray) — appointed to the Legislative Council.
- William Hurley MLA (Macquarie) — appointed to the Legislative Council.
- Daniel O'Connor MLA (Sydney-Phillip)
- Sir John See MLA (Grafton) — appointed to the Legislative Council.

=== Liberal ===
- Samuel Whiddon MLA (Sydney-Cook)

=== Labor ===
- John Power MLA (Sydney-Lang) — lost preselection

=== Independent ===
- Frank Byrne MLA (Hay)
- Thomas Griffith MLA (Albury)
- Edward Terry MLA (Ryde)

== Legislative Assembly ==
Sitting members are shown in bold text. Successful candidates are highlighted in the relevant colour.

Electorate	Progressive candidate	Liberal candidate	Labor candidate	Other candidates
Albury	**Gordon McLaurin**	Henry Ogilvie	Henry Davies	Walter Billson (Ind)
Alexandria	**George Anderson**		**John Dacey**	Thomas Edwards (Ind); John Wilcox (Soc)
Allowrie	**Alexander Campbell**	**Mark Morton**		
Annandale	James Robertson	**William Mahony**		
Armidale	**Michael MacMahon**	**Sydney Kearney**		
Ashburnham		**Eden George**	**Patrick Clara**	**Joseph Reymond** (Ind)
Ashfield		**Frederick Winchcombe**	Lionel Cahill	
Balmain		Walter Anderson	**John Storey**	
Bathurst	**William Young**	Sir James Graham		
Bega	**Henry Clarke**	**William Wood**	Bernard McTernan	Frederick Bland (Ind); Edmund Coman (Ind)
Belmore	**Edward O'Sullivan**	Albert Bruntnell		Tom Batho (Soc); Jack FitzGerald (Ind); George Perry (Ind)
Belubula	**Thomas Waddell**	**Thomas Rose**		
Bingara		**Samuel Moore**		
Blayney	**Paddy Crick**	Charles Garland		
Botany	Patrick Craddock	Rowland Anderson	George Clark	Isaac Spackman (Ind)
Broken Hill			**John Cann**	
Burrangong		Arthur Grimm	**George Burgess**	
Burwood		Thomas Henley		**William Archer** (Ind); Harry McConnell (Ind)
Camden	**John Kidd**	Fred Downes		John Bartlett (Ind); John Moore (Ind Lib)
Camperdown	**James Smith**	William Clegg		John Kelly (Ind); Alfred Levy (Ind); Donald McCulloch (Ind Lab); John Salmon (Ind Lib); George Sparkes (Ind)
Canterbury		**Thomas Mackenzie**	Edgar Cutler	Robert Smith (Ind); Thomas Taylor (Ind)
The Castlereagh		William A'Beckett	**Hugh Macdonald**	
The Clarence	**John McFarlane**			Duncan Beatson (Ind Lib)
The Clyde	John Keenan	**William Millard**		
Cobar		Richard McNeice	**Donald Macdonell**	
Cootamundra	**John Barnes**		**William Holman**	
Corowa		**Richard Ball**		Emanuel Gorman (Ind Lib)
The Darling	**William Willis**		John Meehan	**Richard Sleath** (Ind Lab)
Darling Harbour		Evan Jones	**William Daley**	Henry Connell (Ind); Sydney Green (Ind); William Scafe (Ind); Wilfred Spruson (Ind)
Darlinghurst		**Daniel Levy**	John Birt	
Deniliquin	Henry Jones	John Lewis		George Reynoldson (Ind)
Deniliquin	Henry Jones	John Lewis		George Evans (Ind Prog); James Lawrence (Ind); James Wallace (Ind Prog)
Durham	**Walter Bennett**	Herbert Brown		William Brown (Ind); **Richard Price** (Ind Lib)
The Glebe	Lewis Abrams	**James Hogue**	John Grant	Percy Lucas (Ind Lib)
Gloucester	**John Thomson**	James Young		
Gordon		**Charles Wade**	Arthur Porter	
Gough	John MacDonald	**Follett Thomas**	Frank Foster	Thomas Jones (Ind)
Goulburn		**James Ashton**	Hector Lamond	
Granville	Thomas Dalton	**John Nobbs**	James Catts	
The Gwydir		**Percy Stirton**	**George Jones**	
Hartley		**John Hurley**	Robert Pillans	
Hastings and Macleay	Percival Basche	**Robert Davidson**		
The Hawkesbury	**Brinsley Hall**	Thomas Kelly		
Kahibah			**Alfred Edden**	John Bailey (Ind Lib)
King	**Patrick Quinn**	**Ernest Broughton**		Daniel Green (Ind Lab); James Jones (Ind); John Lawler (Ind); Henry Parr (Ind, Lib); Lindsay Thompson (Ind)
The Lachlan		**William Ferguson**	**Andrew Kelly**	**James Carroll** (Ind Lib)
Lane Cove		David Fell	Sydney Hutton	
Leichhardt		Robert Booth	George Beeby	**John Hawthorne** (Ind Lib)
Liverpool Plains		George Nowland	**David Hall**	John Perry (Ind Lib)
The Macquarie		**Simeon Phillips**	Thomas Thrower	Reginald Atkinson (Ind Lib); John Collins (Ind)
Maitland	**John Gillies**	**James Brunker**		David Mackenzie (Ind)
Marrickville		**Richard McCoy**	Patrick MacManus	
Middle Harbour		Richard Arthur		William Gocher (Soc); **Ellison Quirk** (Ind Prog); Edgar Vanhee (Ind)
Monaro		John Perkins	**Gus Miller**	Henry Dawson (Ind)
Mudgee	**Edwin Richards**	**John Haynes**		
The Murray			**Robert Scobie**	Robert Gibson (Ind Lib)
Murrumbidgee	**Thomas Fitzpatrick**	Alick Smith	Patrick McGarry	Thomas Campbell (Ind); Alfred Humby (Ind)
The Namoi			Thomas Shakespeare	**Albert Collins** (Ind Lib)
Newcastle		**William Dick**		William Cann (Ind)
Newtown		Harold Morgan	**Robert Hollis**	John Neill (Soc)
Northumberland		**John Fitzpatrick**	**Matthew Charlton**	Henry Forster (Ind); Reginald Harris (Ind Lib); Alfred Jacques (Ind)
Orange		Samuel Whitmee	Albert Gardiner	**Andrew Ross** (Ind Lib)
Paddington	Thomas Curran	**Charles Oakes**		
Parramatta	Charles Summerhayes	**Tom Moxham**		William Ferris (Ind)
Petersham	Adam Pringle	**John Cohen**		Henry Davis (Ind Lib)
Phillip		Francis Boyce	**Phillip Sullivan**	Francis Drake (Soc); George Turner (Ind); Samuel Wolfe (Ind Lib)
Pyrmont	James Beer	John Harris	**John McNeill**	Thomas Gollan (Ind); James Moroney (Soc)
Queanbeyan	Patrick Blackall	Alan Millard		
Raleigh	**George Briner**	John Davis		Thomas Lobban (Ind)
Randwick	Thomas Armfield	**David Storey**		Samuel Kennedy (Ind); Thomas Lennard (Ind Lab); James O'Donnell (Ind)
Redfern		George Howe	**James McGowen**	Henry Ostler (Soc)
The Richmond	**John Perry**	Thomas Temperley		Robert Campbell (Ind); Philip Morton (Ind Lib)
Rous	**Richard Meagher**	**John Coleman**		
Rozelle		**Sydney Law**	James Mercer	
St George		**Sir Joseph Carruthers**	William Paine	
St Leonards		Thomas Creswell	George Down	**Edward Clark** (Ind Lib); Charles Lloyd (Ind Lib); David Middleton (Ind); Fountain Winter (Ind)
Sherbrooke		**Broughton O'Conor**		Robert Lalor (Ind Lab); John McCook (Ind); **Thomas Smith** (Ind Prog)
Singleton	**Charles Dight**	**James Fallick**		
Sturt			Arthur Griffith	**William Williams** (Ind)
Surry Hills	**Arthur Nelson**	John Waine		**John Norton** (Ind)
Surry Hills	**Arthur Nelson**	John Waine		James Black (Ind); James Lawrence (Ind); Richard Richards (Ind Lib)
Tamworth	**Robert Levien**	**John Garland**		
Tenterfield	**Robert Pyers**	**Charles Lee**		
The Upper Hunter	John Treflé	**William Fleming**		
Waratah		Charles Turner	**John Estell**	
Waverley		**Thomas Jessep**	Alfred Warton	James Conroy (Ind Lib)
Wickham	**John Fegan**	**Owen Gilbert**	Laurence Vial	
Wollondilly		**William McCourt**		Theodore Corby (Ind); Sydney Innes-Noad (Ind Lib)
Wollongong		**Edward Allen**	**John Nicholson**	
Woollahra		**William Latimer**		Robert Usher (Ind)
Wynyard	**Robert Donaldson**	Robert Joyce	William Johnson	
Yass	Bernard Grogan	**William Affleck**	**Niels Nielsen**	

== See also ==
- Members of the New South Wales Legislative Assembly, 1904–1907
- Results of the 1904 New South Wales state election
