= Members of the New South Wales Legislative Assembly, 1904–1907 =

The members of the New South Wales Legislative Assembly who served in the 20th parliament of New South Wales from 1904 to 1907 were elected at the 1904 state election on 6 August 1904. The Speaker was William McCourt.

Name	Party	Electorate	Term in office
Rowland Anderson	Liberal Reform	Botany	1904–1907
Walter Anderson	Liberal Reform	Balmain	1904–1907
Richard Arthur	Liberal Reform	Middle Harbour	1904–1932
James Ashton	Liberal Reform	Goulburn	1894–1907
Richard Ball	Liberal Reform	Corowa	1895–1898 1904–1937
Walter Bennett	Progressive	Durham	1898–1907 1917–1934
Robert Booth	Liberal Reform	Leichhardt	1904–1907
George Briner	Progressive	Raleigh	1901–1920
Ernest Broughton	Liberal Reform	King	1901–1910
Albert Bruntnell ^{4}	Liberal Reform	Surry Hills	1906–1907 1910–1913 1916–1929
George Burgess	Labour	Burrangong	1901–1917
John Cann	Labour	Broken Hill	1891–1916
Joseph Carruthers	Liberal Reform	St George	1887–1908
Matthew Charlton	Labour	Northumberland	1903–1910
John Cohen	Liberal Reform	Petersham	1898–1919
John Coleman ^{1}	Liberal Reform	Rous	1901–1905
Albert Collins	Independent Liberal	Namoi	1901–1910
Thomas Creswell	Liberal Reform	St Leonards	1904–1907
Paddy Crick ^{8}	Progressive	Blayney	1889–1906
John Dacey	Labour	Alexandria	1895–1912
William Daley	Labour	Darling Harbour	1901–1907
Robert Davidson	Liberal Reform	Hastings and Macleay	1901–1910
William Dick	Liberal Reform	Newcastle	1894–1907
Robert Donaldson	Progressive	Wynyard	1898–1913
Fred Downes	Liberal Reform	Camden	1904–1913
Alfred Edden	Labour	Kahibah	1891–1920
John Estell	Labour	Waratah	1901 -1913 1917–1922
James Fallick	Liberal Reform	Singleton	1901–1920
John Fegan	Progressive	Wickham	1891–1907 1920–1922
David Fell	Liberal Reform	Lane Cove	1904–1913
William Fleming	Liberal Reform	Upper Hunter	1901–1910
Albert Gardiner	Labour	Orange	1891–1895 1904–1907
Eden George	Liberal Reform	Ashburnham	1901–1907
John Gillies	Progressive	Maitland	1891–1911
Arthur Griffith	Labour	Sturt	1894–1903 1904–1920
Brinsley Hall	Progressive	Hawkesbury	1901–1917
Thomas Henley	Liberal Reform	Burwood	1904–1935
George Hindmarsh ^{1}	Liberal Reform	Rous	1905–1913
James Hogue	Liberal Reform	Glebe	1894–1895 1998-1910
Robert Hollis	Labour	Newtown	1901–1917
William Holman ^{5}	Labour	Cootamundra	1898–1920
John Hurley	Liberal Reform	Hartley	1872–1874 1876–1880, 1887–1891 1901–1907
Thomas Jessep	Liberal Reform	Waverley	1896–1907
George Jones	Labour	Gwydir	1902–1913
Sydney Kearney	Liberal Reform	Armidale	1903–1907
Andrew Kelly	Labour	Lachlan	1891–1894 1901–1913
William Latimer	Liberal Reform	Woollahra	1901–1920
Sydney Law	Liberal Reform	Rozelle	1891–1894 1901–1913
Charles Lee	Liberal Reform	Tenterfield	1884–1920
Robert Levien	Progressive	Tamworth	1880–1889, 1889–1913
Daniel Levy	Liberal Reform	Darlinghurst	1901–1937
Hugh Macdonald ^{6}	Labour	Castlereagh	1901–1906
Donald Macdonell	Labour	Cobar	1901–1911
Thomas Mackenzie	Liberal Reform	Canterbury	1901–1907
William Mahony	Liberal Reform	Annandale	1894–1910
Prosper McCell	Liberal Reform	Goulburn	1899–1911
William McCourt	Liberal Reform	Wollondilly	1882–1885 1887–1913
Richard McCoy	Liberal Reform	Marrickville	1901–1910
John McFarlane	Progressive	Clarence	1887–1915
Patrick McGarry	Labour	Murrumbidgee	1904–1920
James McGowen	Labour	Redfern	1891–1917
Gordon McLaurin	Progressive	Albury	1901–1913
John McNeill	Labour	Pyrmont	1902–1913
John Meehan	Labour	Darling	1904–1913
Alan Millard ^{3}	Liberal Reform	Queanbeyan	1904–1906
William Millard	Liberal Reform	Clyde	1894–1920 1920–1921
Gus Miller	Labour	Monaro	1889–1918
Samuel Moore	Liberal Reform	Bingara	1885–1910
Mark Morton	Liberal Reform	Allowrie	1901–1920 1922–1938
Tom Moxham	Liberal Reform	Parramatta	1901–1916
John Nicholson	Labour	Wollongong	1891–1917
Niels Nielsen	Labour	Yass	1899–1913
John Nobbs	Liberal Reform	Granville	1888–1993 1898–1913
John Norton ^{4, 5}	Independent	Surry Hills	1898–1906 1807–1910
Charles Oakes	Liberal Reform	Paddington	1901–1910 1917–1925
Broughton O'Conor	Liberal Reform	Sherbrooke	1898–1907
Edward O'Sullivan	Progressive	Belmore	1885–1910
John Perry (b 1845)	Progressive	Richmond	1889–1920
John Perry (b 1849)	Independent Liberal	Liverpool Plains	1904–1907 1911
George Reynoldson	Independent	Deniliquin	1904–1907
Edwin Richards	Progressive	Mudgee	1894–1904
William Robson ^{2}	Liberal Reform	Ashfield	1905–1920
Granville Ryrie ^{3}	Liberal Reform	Queanbeyan	1906–1910
Robert Scobie	Labour	Murray	1901–1917
James Smith	Progressive	Camperdown	1885–1887 1901–1907
David Storey	Liberal Reform	Randwick	1894–1920
Phillip Sullivan	Labour	Phillip	1901–1907
Follett Thomas	Liberal Reform	Gough	1903–1920
Thomas Thrower	Labour	Macquarie	1904–1917
John Treflé ^{6}	Labour	Castlereagh	1906–1915
Thomas Waddell	Progressive	Belubula	1897–1917
Charles Wade	Liberal Reform	Gordon	1903–1917
Frederick Winchcombe ^{2}	Liberal Reform	Ashfield	1900–1905
John Withington ^{8}	Liberal Reform	Blayney	1907
William Wood	Liberal Reform	Bega	1894–1913
James Young	Liberal Reform	Gloucester	1880–1895 1898–1907
William Young	Progressive	Bathurst	1900–1907

By-elections

The 20th New South Wales Legislative Assembly was the last parliament in which ministers were required to resign and contest a by-election on appointment.

#	Electorate	Departing Member	Party	Reason for By-election	Date of By-election	Winner of By-election	Party
1	Rous	John Coleman	Liberal Reform	Death	11 February 1905	George Hindmarsh	Liberal Reform
2	Ashfield	Frederick Winchcombe	Liberal Reform	Extended absence visiting England	16 August 1905	William Robson	Liberal Reform
3	Queanbeyan	Alan Millard	Liberal Reform	Criminal conviction: Fraud	7 April 1906	Granville Ryrie	Liberal Reform
4	Surry Hills	John Norton	Independent	Challenged William Holman to face a by-election	21 July 1906	Albert Bruntnell	Liberal Reform
5	Cootamundra	William Holman	Labour	Challenged to a by-election by John Norton	17 July 1906	William Holman	Labour
6	Castlereagh	Hugh Macdonald	Labour	Death	24 November 1906	John Treflé	Labour
7	Blayney	Paddy Crick	Progressive	Resigned after being acquitted of corruption charges	12 January 1907	John Withington	Liberal Reform

== See also ==
- Carruthers ministry
- Results of the 1904 New South Wales state election
- Candidates of the 1904 New South Wales state election
