= Results of the 1904 New South Wales state election =

New South Wales state election, 6 August 1904 Legislative Assembly << 1901–1907 >>
Enrolled voters	689,490				
Votes cast	396,622		Turnout	59.31	−3.53
Informal votes	3,973		Informal	0.99	+0.21
Summary of votes by party
Party	Primary votes	%	Swing	Seats	Change
Liberal Reform	176,796	44.58	+11.03	45	+8
Labour	92,426	23.30	+4.86	25	+1
Progressive	75,297	18.98	−4.01	16	−26
Independent	25,605	6.46	−4.62	2	−10
Independent Liberal	21,189	5.34	−3.26	2	−2
Other	5,309	1.34	−4.01	0	−6
Total				90	-35

The 1904 New South Wales state election involved 90 electoral districts returning one member each. The election was conducted on the basis of a simple majority or first-past-the-post voting system. There were two significant changes from the 1901 election, the first was that women were given the right to vote, which saw an increase in the number of enrolled voters from 345,500 in 1901, to 689,490 in 1904. The second was that as a result of the 1903 New South Wales referendum, the number of members of the Legislative Assembly was reduced from 125 to 90. The combined effect of the changes meant that the average number of enrolled voters per electorate went from 2,764, (Note: In 1901 the electorates ranged from Wentworth (1,706) to Willoughby (4,854).) to 7,661, (Note: In 1904 the electorates ranged from The Clyde (5,607) to Surry Hills (10,172).) an increase of 277%. Leichhardt was the only district that was not substantially changed, while The Macquarie and The Murray districts retained nothing but the name.

In this election, in 20 electorates the winning candidate received less than 50% of the votes, while 2 were uncontested. (Note: The uncontested electorates were Bingara and Broken Hill.) Two seats were contested by 3 sitting members. (Note: The two seats contested by 3 sitting members were Ashburnham and The Lachlan.)

Of the 125 members of the house prior to the election, 4 were appointed to the Legislative Council, (Note: The members of the Progressive party appointed to the Legislative Council were James Gormly, James Hayes, William Hurley and Sir John See.) 10 did not contest the election, (Note: For a comprehensive list, see Candidates of the 1904 New South Wales state election § Retiring members.) and a further 41 were defeated at the election. 70 members (56%) retained a seat after the election.

== Election results ==
=== Albury ===
1904 New South Wales state election: Albury
Party	Candidate	Votes	%	±%
Progressive	Gordon McLaurin	1,390	35.3	
Labour	Henry Davies	902	22.9	
Independent	Walter Billson	850	21.6	
Liberal Reform	Henry Ogilvie	799	20.3	
Total formal votes		3,941	98.9	
Informal votes		44	1.1	
Turnout		3,985	59.0	
Progressive gain from Independent				

Albury lost part of the district to Corowa and was expanded to include part of the abolished seat of The Hume. Thomas Griffith (Independent), the member for Albury, did not contest the election, while Gordon McLaurin (Progressive) was the member for The Hume.

=== Alexandria ===
1904 New South Wales state election: Alexandria
Party	Candidate	Votes	%	±%
Labour	John Dacey	2,859	49.8	
Progressive	George Anderson	2,742	47.8	
Independent	Thomas Edwards	90	1.6	
Socialist Labor	John Wilcox	49	0.9	
Total formal votes		5,740	99.4	
Informal votes		36	0.6	
Turnout		5,776	64.2	
Labour win		(new seat)		

Alexandria was a new seat, comprising parts of the seat of Botany and the abolished seats of Darlington, Newtown-Erskine and Waterloo. John Dacey was the member for Botany who had lost Labour pre-selection for that seat, while George Anderson was the member for the abolished seat of Waterloo. The member for Darlington was Phillip Sullivan (Labour) who successfully contested Phillip while the member for Newtown-Erskine was Robert Hollis (Labour) who successfully contested Newtown.

=== Allowrie ===
1904 New South Wales state election: Allowrie
Party	Candidate	Votes	%	±%
Liberal Reform	Mark Morton	3,594	60.0	
Progressive	Alexander Campbell	2,395	40.0	
Total formal votes		5,989	99.5	
Informal votes		29	0.5	
Turnout		6,018	73.2	
Liberal Reform win		(new seat)		

Allowrie was a new seat comprising the abolished seat of Kiama as well as parts of The Shoalhaven and Illawarra. Mark Morton was the member for The Shoalhaven while Alexander Campbell was the member for Kiama. The member for Illawarra was Edward Allen (Liberal Reform) who unsuccessfully contested Wollongong.

=== Annandale ===
1904 New South Wales state election: Annandale
Party	Candidate	Votes	%	±%
Liberal Reform	William Mahony	2,815	60.7	
Progressive	James Robertson	1,826	39.3	
Total formal votes		4,641	99.0	
Informal votes		45	1.0	
Turnout		4,686	57.0	
Liberal Reform hold				

Annandale lost parts of the district to The Glebe and Roxelle. It absorbed parts of Petersham and the abolished seat of Newtown-Camperdown. The member for Annandale was William Mahony (Liberal Reform). The member for Petersham was John Cohen (Liberal Reform) who successfully contested that seat while the member for Newtown-Camperdown was James Smith (Independent Progressive) who successfully contested Camperdown.

=== Armidale ===
1904 New South Wales state election: Armidale
Party	Candidate	Votes	%	±%
Liberal Reform	Sydney Kearney	2,124	50.7	
Progressive	Michael MacMahon	2,067	49.3	
Total formal votes		4,191	99.4	
Informal votes		25	0.6	
Turnout		4,216	55.9	
Liberal Reform hold				

Armidale was expanded to include part of the abolished seat of Uralla-Walcha. Sydney Kearney was the member for Armidale while Michael MacMahon was the member for Uralla-Walcha.

=== Ashburnham ===
1904 New South Wales state election: Ashburnham
Party	Candidate	Votes	%	±%
Liberal Reform	Eden George	1,832	35.4	
Independent	Joseph Reymond	1,721	33.2	
Labour	Patrick Clara	1,626	31.4	
Total formal votes		5,179	99.4	
Informal votes		29	0.6	
Turnout		5,208	68.7	
Liberal Reform gain from Progressive				

Ashburnham was one of two seats contested by 3 sitting members. The district lost parts to Belubula and absorbed parts of the abolished seats of Condoublin and Molong. Joseph Reymond had held the seat since the 1898 election as a member of the Progressive Party, however was standing as an independent. The member for Condoublin was Patrick Clara (Labour) and Eden George (Liberal Reform) was the member for the abolished seat of Sydney-Belmore. The member for Molong was Andrew Ross (Independent Liberal) who unsuccessfully contested Orange.

=== Ashfield ===
1904 New South Wales state election: Ashfield
Party	Candidate	Votes	%	±%
Liberal Reform	Frederick Winchcombe	3,434	85.8	
Labour	Lionel Cahill	570	14.2	
Total formal votes		4,004	98.6	
Informal votes		55	1.4	
Turnout		4,059	49.6	
Liberal Reform hold				

Ashfield lost part of the district to Burwood and was expanded to include part of Petersham. Frederick Winchcombe (Liberal Reform) was the member for Ashfield. The member for Petersham was John Cohen (Liberal Reform) who successfully contested that electorate.

=== Balmain ===
1904 New South Wales state election: Balmain
Party	Candidate	Votes	%	±%
Liberal Reform	Walter Anderson	2,642	52.5	
Labour	John Storey	2,390	47.5	
Total formal votes		5,032	99.5	
Informal votes		26	0.5	
Turnout		5,058	63.5	
Liberal Reform win		(new seat)		

Balmain consisted of Balmain North and part of Balmain South. John Storey was the member for the abolished seat of Balmain North, while the member for Balmain South was Sydney Law (Independent Labour) who successfully contested Rozelle.

=== Bathurst ===
1904 New South Wales state election: Bathurst
Party	Candidate	Votes	%	±%
Progressive	William Young	2,788	54.1	
Liberal Reform	Sir James Graham	2,367	45.9	
Total formal votes		5,155	99.4	
Informal votes		31	0.6	
Turnout		5,186	67.0	
Progressive hold				

Bathurst was expanded to include part of The Macquarie. It was held by William Young (Progressive). The member for The Macquarie was William Hurley (Progressive) who was appointed to the Legislative Council.

=== Bega ===
1904 New South Wales state election: Bega
Party	Candidate	Votes	%	±%
Liberal Reform	William Wood	1,904	36.9	
Progressive	Henry Clarke	1,063	20.6	
Labour	Bernard McTernan	1,062	20.6	
Independent	Frederick Bland	775	15.0	
Independent	Edmund Coman	351	6.8	
Total formal votes		5,155	99.3	
Informal votes		36	0.7	
Turnout		5,191	72.1	
Liberal Reform gain from Progressive				

Bega was expanded to include part of the abolished district of Eden-Bombala. Henry Clarke (Progressive) was the member for Bega while William Wood (Liberal Reform) was the member for Eden-Bombala.

=== Belmore ===
1904 New South Wales state election: Belmore
Party	Candidate	Votes	%	±%
Progressive	Edward O'Sullivan	2,760	51.0	
Liberal Reform	Albert Bruntnell	1,965	36.3	
Independent	Jack FitzGerald	484	8.9	
Independent	George Perry	178	3.3	
Socialist Labor	Thomas Batho	24	0.4	
Total formal votes		5,411	99.3	
Informal votes		38	0.7	
Turnout		5,449	57.1	
Progressive win		(new seat)		

Belmore was a new seat consisted of the abolished seat of Sydney-Belmore and parts of the abolished seats of Sydney-Cook and Sydney-Phillip. The member for Sydney-Belmore was Eden George (Liberal Reform) who successfully contested Ashburnum. The members for Sydney-Cook, Samuel Whiddon (Liberal reform), and Sydney-Phillip, Daniel O'Connor (Progressive), did not contest the election. Edward O'Sullivan (Progressive) was the member for Queanbeyan.

=== Belubula ===
1904 New South Wales state election: Belubula
Party	Candidate	Votes	%	±%
Progressive	Thomas Waddell	3,009	57.2	
Liberal Reform	Thomas Rose	2,255	42.8	
Total formal votes		5,264	99.4	
Informal votes		32	0.6	
Turnout		5,296	71.7	
Progressive win		(new seat)		

Belubula was a new seat consisting of the abolished seat of Cowra and parts of Ashburnum, Orange and the abolished seat of Molong. Thomas Waddell (Progressive) was the member for the abolished seat of Cowra. The member for Orange was Harry Newman (Liberal Reform) who died two months prior to the election. The member for Molong was Andrew Ross (Independent Liberal) who unsuccessfully contested Orange. Thomas Rose (Liberal Reform) was member for the abolished seat of Argyle.

=== Bingara ===
1904 New South Wales state election: Bingara
Party	Candidate	Votes	%	±%
Liberal Reform	Samuel Moore	unopposed		
Liberal Reform hold				

Bingara was expanded to include part of Uralla-Walcha. Samuel Moore (Liberal Reform) was the member for Bingara. The member for the abolished seat of Uralla-Walcha was Michael MacMahon (Progressive) who unsuccessfully contested Armidale.

=== Blayney ===
1904 New South Wales state election: Blayney
Party	Candidate	Votes	%	±%
Progressive	Paddy Crick	2,406	52.2	
Liberal Reform	Charles Garland	2,207	47.8	
Total formal votes		4,613	99.3	
Informal votes		35	0.8	
Turnout		4,648	66.1	
Progressive win		(new seat)		

Blayney was a new seat consisting of parts of Hartley, The Macquarie and the abolished seat of West Macquarie. Paddy Crick was the member for West Macquarie. The member for Hartley was John Hurley (Independent) who successfully contested that seat while his brother William (Progressive) was the member for The Macquarie who was appointed to the Legislative Council.

=== Botany ===
1904 New South Wales state election: Botany
Party	Candidate	Votes	%	±%
Liberal Reform	Rowland Anderson	2,224	40.1	
Labour	George Clark	2,154	38.8	
Independent	Isaac Spackman	945	17.0	
Progressive	Patrick Craddock	224	4.0	
Total formal votes		5,547	99.0	
Informal votes		57	1.0	
Turnout		5,604	67.1	
Liberal Reform gain from Labour				

Botany lost part of the district to Randwick and absorbed part of Newtown-St Peters. The member for Botany was John Dacey who, lost Labour pre-selection and successfully contested Alexandria instead. The member for Newtown-St Peters was James Fallick (Independent Liberal) who successfully contested Singleton as an official Liberal Reform candidate.

=== Broken Hill ===
1904 New South Wales state election: Broken Hill
Party	Candidate	Votes	%	±%
Labour	John Cann	unopposed		
Labour hold				

Broken Hill absorbed part of the abolished seat of Alma. John Cann (Labour) was the member for Broken Hill. William Williams (Independent Labour), the member for Alma, unsuccessfully contested Sturt as an independent.

=== Burrangong ===
1904 New South Wales state election: Burrangong
Party	Candidate	Votes	%	±%
Labour	George Burgess	2,892	54.4	
Liberal Reform	Arthur Grimm	2,427	45.6	
Total formal votes		5,319	98.8	
Informal votes		65	1.2	
Turnout		5,384	69.6	
Labour win		(new seat)		

Burrangong was a new seat consisting of parts of the abolished seats of Boorowa, Grenfell and Young, each of which were held by the Labour Party. The member for Young was George Burgess. The member for Boorowa was Niels Nielsen who successfully contested Yass and the member for Grenfell was William Holman who successfully contested Cootamundra.

=== Burwood ===
1904 New South Wales state election: Burwood
Party	Candidate	Votes	%	±%
Liberal Reform	Thomas Henley	3,265	58.5	
Independent	William Archer	2,299	41.2	
Independent	Harry McConnell	20	0.4	
Total formal votes		5,584	99.3	
Informal votes		38	0.7	
Turnout		5,622	64.0	
Liberal Reform gain from Independent				

Burwood was expanded to include part of Ashfield. The member for Burwood was William Archer (Independent). The member for Ashfield was Frederick Winchcombe (Liberal Reform) who successfully contested that electorate.

=== Camden ===
1904 New South Wales state election: Camden
Party	Candidate	Votes	%	±%
Liberal Reform	Fred Downes	2,480	48.2	
Progressive	John Kidd (defeated)	2,047	39.8	
Independent Liberal	John Moore	384	7.5	
Independent	John Bartlett	233	4.5	
Total formal votes		5,144	99.2	
Informal votes		43	0.8	
Turnout		5,187	71.6	
Liberal Reform gain from Progressive				

Camden lost part of the district to Wollondilly and absorbed parts of Canterbury and the abolished seats of The Nepean, and Woronora. The member for Camden was John Kidd (Progressive). The member for The Nepean was Thomas Smith who unsuccessfully contested Sherbrooke. The member for Woronora was John Nicholson who successfully contested Wollongong.

=== Camperdown ===
1904 New South Wales state election: Camperdown
Party	Candidate	Votes	%	±%
Progressive	James Smith	1,841	38.5	
Liberal Reform	William Clegg	1,352	28.3	
Independent Liberal	John Salmon	881	18.4	
Independent	Alfred Levy	352	7.4	
Independent	George Sparkes	203	4.3	
Independent Labour	Donald McCulloch	138	2.9	
Independent	John Kelly	13	0.27	
Total formal votes		4,780	98.4	
Informal votes		76	1.6	
Turnout		4,856	55.7	
Progressive win		(new seat)		

Camperdown was a new seat consisting of parts of Annandale and the abolished seats of Newtown-Camperdown, Darlington, Newtown-Camperdown and Newtown-Erskine. James Smith (Progressive) was the member for Newtown-Camperdown. There was a battle for the Liberal pre-selection between William Clegg and John Salmon, with Salmon withdrawing from the process and standing as an independent, splitting the liberal vote.

=== Canterbury ===
1904 New South Wales state election: Canterbury
Party	Candidate	Votes	%	±%
Liberal Reform	Thomas Mackenzie	2,687	56.9	
Labour	Edgar Cutler	1,166	24.7	
Independent	Thomas Taylor	813	17.2	
Independent	Robert Smith	56	1.2	
Total formal votes		4,722	99.0	
Informal votes		48	1.0	
Turnout		4,770	56.8	
Liberal Reform hold				

Canterbury lost part of the district to Camden and Granville. It absorbed parts of Marrickville, Petersham and St George. Thomas Mackenzie (Liberal Reform) was the member for Canterbury. Each of the members for Marrickville. Petersham and St George successfully contested their district.

=== The Castlereagh ===
1904 New South Wales state election: The Castlereagh
Party	Candidate	Votes	%	±%
Labour	Hugh Macdonald	1,867	50.2	
Liberal Reform	William A'Beckett	1,853	49.8	
Total formal votes		3,720	98.6	
Informal votes		53	1.4	
Turnout		3,773	52.1	
Labour win		(new seat)		

The Castlereagh was a new seat consisting of the abolished seat of Coonamble and part of the abolished seat of Dubbo. The member for Coonamble was Hugh Macdonald (Labour). The member for Dubbo was Simeon Phillips (Liberal Reform) who stayed with the majority of the seat and unsuccessfully contested The Macquarie.

=== The Clarence ===
1904 New South Wales state election: The Clarence
Party	Candidate	Votes	%	±%
Progressive	John McFarlane	2,033	67.7	
Independent Liberal	Duncan Beatson	968	32.3	
Total formal votes		3,001	99.4	
Informal votes		17	0.6	
Turnout		3,018	43.7	
Progressive hold				

The Clarence lost much of the district to Raleigh and absorbed all of Grafton and a part of Raleigh. The Premier Sir John See (Progressive) was the member for Grafton while John McFarlane (Progressive) was the member for The Clarence. The question of the Progressive candidate was resolved when Sir John See decided to retire due to ill health and accepted an appointment to the Legislative Council.

=== The Clyde ===
1904 New South Wales state election: The Clyde
Party	Candidate	Votes	%	±%
Liberal Reform	William Millard	2,132	61.5	
Progressive	John Keenan	1,336	38.5	
Total formal votes		3,468	99.5	
Informal votes		19	0.5	
Turnout		3,487	62.2	
Liberal Reform win		(new seat)		

The Clyde was a new seat which absorbed the whole of whole of the abolished seat of Moruya and parts of the abolished seats of Braidwood and The Shoalhaven. The member for Moruya was William Millard (Liberal Reform). The member for The Shoalhaven was Mark Morton (Liberal Reform) who successfully contested Allowrie. The member for Braidwood was Albert Chapman (Progressive) who did not contest the election.

=== Cobar ===
1904 New South Wales state election: Cobar
Party	Candidate	Votes	%	±%
Labour	Donald Macdonell	1,982	68.8	
Liberal Reform	Richard McNeice	899	31.2	
Total formal votes		2,881	99.3	
Informal votes		19	0.7	
Turnout		2,900	44.7	
Labour hold				

Cobar absorbed parts of The Lachlan and parts of the abolished seats of The Barwon, Condoublin and Wilcannia. The member for The Barwon was William Willis (Progressive) who unsuccessfully contested The Darling. The member for Condoublin was Patrick Clara (Labour) who unsuccessfully contested Ashburnum. The member for The Lachlan was James Carroll (Progressive) who unsuccessfully contested that seat. The member for Wilcannia was Richard Sleath (Independent Labour) who also unsuccessfully contested The Darling.

=== Cootamundra ===
1904 New South Wales state election: Cootamundra
Party	Candidate	Votes	%	±%
Labour	William Holman	2,559	57.8	
Progressive	John Barnes	1,868	42.2	
Total formal votes		4,427	99.2	
Informal votes		36	0.8	
Turnout		4,463	64.5	
Labour win		(new seat)		

Cootamundra was a new seat that consisted of part of The Murrumbidgee, and parts of the abolished seats of Gundagai, Wagga Wagga and Young. John Barnes was the member for Gundagai. The member for The Murrumbidgee was Thomas Fitzpatrick (Progressive) who unsuccessfully contested that seat. The member for Wagga Wagga James Gormly (Progressive) did not contest the election and was appointed to the Legislative Council. The member for Young was George Burgess (Labour) who successfully contested Burrangong. William Holman (Labour) was the member for the abolished seat of Grenfell.

=== Corowa ===
1904 New South Wales state election: Corowa
Party	Candidate	Votes	%	±%
Liberal Reform	Richard Ball	2,276	62.1	
Independent Liberal	Emanuel Gorman	1,392	38.0	
Total formal votes		3,668	98.5	
Informal votes		55	1.5	
Turnout		3,723	58.3	
Liberal Reform win		(new seat)		

Corowa was a new seat comprising parts of Albury, Murray and the abolished seat of The Hume. Gordon McLaurin (Progressive) was the member for The Hume, however he successfully contested Albury, while James Hayes (Progressive), the member for The Murray was appointed to the Legislative Council and did not contest the election.

=== The Darling ===
1904 New South Wales state election: The Darling
Party	Candidate	Votes	%	±%
Labour	John Meehan	1,999	50.6	
Progressive	William Willis	1,692	42.8	
Independent Labour	Richard Sleath	259	6.6	
Total formal votes		3,950	98.9	
Informal votes		44	1.1	
Turnout		3,994	55.5	
Labour win		(new seat)		

The Darling was a new seat comprising Bourke and parts of The Barwon and Wilcannia electorates. The member for Bourke was William Davis (Progressive) who did not contest the election. The member for The Barwon was William Willis (Progressive) while the member for Wilcannia was Richard Sleath who had initially been elected as a Labour candidate at the 1894 election, but had lost his Labour endorsement prior to the 1901 election which he won as an Independent Labour candidate.

=== Darling Harbour ===
1904 New South Wales state election: Darling Harbour
Party	Candidate	Votes	%	±%
Labour	William Daley	1,907	43.2	
Liberal Reform	Evan Jones	1,395	31.6	
Independent	Wilfred Spruson	1,099	24.9	
Independent	Henry Connell	7	0.2	
Independent	Sydney Green	4	0.1	
Independent	William Scafe	4	0.1	
Total formal votes		4,416	97.6	
Informal votes		109	2.4	
Turnout		4,525	50.9	
Labour win		(new seat)		

Darling Harbour was a new seat consisting of the abolished seats of Sydney-Gipps, Sydney-Lang, and parts of the abolished seats of Sydney-King and Sydney-Denison. The member for Sydney-Gipps was William Daley (Labour) and he won the Labour pre-selection ahead of the member for Sydney-Lang, John Power, who did not contest the election. The member for Sydney-King was Ernest Broughton (Progressive) who successfully contested King as a Liberal Reform candidate. The member for Sydney-Denison was Andrew Kelly who successfully contested The Lachlan.

=== Darlinghurst ===
1904 New South Wales state election: Darlinghurst
Party	Candidate	Votes	%	±%
Liberal Reform	Daniel Levy	2,743	56.3	
Labour	John Birt	2,129	43.7	
Total formal votes		4,872	99.5	
Informal votes		27	0.6	
Turnout		4,899	50.0	
Liberal Reform win		(new seat)		

Darlinghurst was a new seat consisting of parts of Paddington and the abolished seats of Sydney-Fitzroy and Sydney-Bligh. The member for Sydney-Fitzroy was Daniel Levy (Liberal Reform). The member for Sydney-Bligh was Patrick Quinn (Progressive) who unsuccessfully contested King. The member for Paddington was Charles Oakes (Liberal Reform) who successfully contested that seat.

=== Deniliquin ===
1904 New South Wales state election: Deniliquin
Party	Candidate	Votes	%	±%
Independent	George Reynoldson	911	31.4	
Liberal Reform	John Lewis	789	27.2	
Ind. Progressive	James Wallace	546	18.8	
Progressive	Henry Jones	326	11.2	
Total formal votes		2,902	98.7	
Informal votes		37	1.3	
Turnout		2,939	46.3	
Independent gain from Ind. Progressive				

Deniliquin was expanded to include part of The Murray. The sitting member for Deniliquin was Joseph Evans (Independent Progressive) who died three weeks prior to the election. The member for The Murray was James Hayes (Progressive) who was appointed to the Legislative Council and did not contest the election.

=== Durham ===
1904 New South Wales state election: Durham
Party	Candidate	Votes	%	±%
Progressive	Walter Bennett	2,196	46.4	
Liberal Reform	Herbert Brown	1,617	34.2	
Independent	William Brown	919	19.4	
Independent Liberal	Richard Price	3	0.1	
Total formal votes		4,735	98.9	
Informal votes		51	1.1	
Turnout		4,786	69.1	
Progressive hold				

Durham was expanded to include part of Gloucester. The member for Durham was Walter Bennett (Progressive). The member for Gloucester was Richard Price (Independent) who nominated to contest Durham however he withdrew from the contest.

=== The Glebe ===
1904 New South Wales state election: The Glebe
Party	Candidate	Votes	%	±%
Liberal Reform	James Hogue	2,667	53.7	
Labour	John Grant	1,579	31.8	
Independent Liberal	Percy Lucas	474	9.5	
Progressive	Lewis Abrams	250	5.0	
Total formal votes		4,970	99.0	
Informal votes		52	1.0	
Turnout		5,022	58.2	
Liberal Reform hold				

The Glebe was expanded to include part of Annandale. The member for The Glebe was James Hogue (Liberal Reform). The member for Annandale was William Mahony (Liberal Reform) who successfully contested that seat.

=== Gloucester ===
1904 New South Wales state election: Gloucester
Party	Candidate	Votes	%	±%
Liberal Reform	James Young	2,635	57.4	
Progressive	John Thomson	1,955	42.6	
Total formal votes		4,590	99.7	
Informal votes		12	0.3	
Turnout		4,602	70.1	
Liberal Reform gain from Independent				

Gloucester lost part of the district to Durham and absorbed part of Manning. The member for Gloucester was Richard Price (Independent) who nominated to contest Durham however he withdrew from the contest. John Thomson (Progressive) was the member for Manning.

=== Gordon ===
1904 New South Wales state election: Gordon
Party	Candidate	Votes	%	±%
Liberal Reform	Charles Wade	3,115	78.1	
Labour	Arthur Porter	873	21.9	
Total formal votes		3,988	98.5	
Informal votes		61	1.5	
Turnout		4,049	53.8	
Liberal Reform win		(new seat)		

Gordon was a new seat and consisted of part of the abolished seat of Willoughby. The member for Willoughby was Charles Wade (Liberal Reform).

=== Gough ===
1904 New South Wales state election: Gough
Party	Candidate	Votes	%	±%
Liberal Reform	Follet Thomas	2,234	50.9	
Labour	Frank Foster	1,799	41.0	
Progressive	John MacDonald	228	5.2	
Independent	Thomas Jones	130	3.0	
Total formal votes		4,391	98.3	
Informal votes		74	1.7	
Turnout		4,465	62.4	
Liberal Reform win		(new seat)		

Gough was a new seat that comprised the abolished seat of Glenn Innes and part of Inverell. The member for Glen Innes was Follet Thomas (Labour). The member for Inverell was George Jones (Labour) who successfully contested The Gwydir.

=== Goulburn ===
1904 New South Wales state election: Goulburn
Party	Candidate	Votes	%	±%
Liberal Reform	James Ashton	2,480	56.2	
Labour	Hector Lamond	1,931	43.8	
Total formal votes		4,411	99.4	
Informal votes		28	0.6	
Turnout		4,439	59.0	
Liberal Reform hold				

Goulburn was expanded to include part of the abolished seat of Argyle. The member for Goulburn was James Ashton (Liberal Reform). The member for Argyle was Thomas Rose (Liberal Reform) who unsuccessfully contested Belubula.

=== Granville ===
1904 New South Wales state election: Granville
Party	Candidate	Votes	%	±%
Liberal Reform	John Nobbs	3,355	72.5	
Labour	James Catts	1,217	26.3	
Progressive	Thomas Dalton	56	1.2	
Total formal votes		4,628	99.6	
Informal votes		20	0.4	
Turnout		4,648	59.2	
Liberal Reform hold				

Granville was expanded to include part of Canterbury. The member for Granville was John Nobbs (Liberal Reform). The member for Canterbury was Thomas Mackenzie (Liberal Reform) who successfully contested that seat.

=== The Gwydir ===
1904 New South Wales state election: The Gwydir
Party	Candidate	Votes	%	±%
Labour	George Jones	1,970	50.3	
Liberal Reform	Percy Stirton	1,945	49.7	
Total formal votes		3,915	99.1	
Informal votes		34	0.9	
Turnout		3,949	60.2	
Labour win		(new seat)		

The Gwydir was a new seat and comprised the abolished seat of Moree and part of Inverell. The member for Moree was Percy Stirton (Liberal Reform) and George Jones (Labour) was the member for Inverell.

=== Hartley ===
1904 New South Wales state election: Hartley
Party	Candidate	Votes	%	±%
Liberal Reform	John Hurley	2,498	58.0	
Labour	Robert Pillans	1,812	42.0	
Total formal votes		4,310	99.2	
Informal votes		36	0.8	
Turnout		0	0.0	
Member changed to Liberal Reform from Independent				

Hartley lost part of the district to Blayney and Wollondilly and was expanded with parts of The Macquarie, Northumberland, and the abolished seat of Rylstone. The member for Hartley was John Hurley (independent) who stood as a Liberal Reform candidate. The member for The Macquarie was his brother William Hurley (Progressive), who was appointed to the Legislative Council. The member for Rylstone was John Fitzpatrick who unsuccessfully contested Northumberland. The member for Northumberland was John Norton (Independent) who successfully contested Surry Hills.

=== The Hastings and The Macleay ===
1904 New South Wales state election: The Hastings and The Macleay
Party	Candidate	Votes	%	±%
Liberal Reform	Robert Davidson	2,303	57.4	
Progressive	Percival Basche	1,709	42.6	
Total formal votes		4,012	98.7	
Informal votes		52	1.3	
Turnout		4,064	62.9	
Liberal Reform hold				

The Hastings and The Macleay was expanded to include part of the abolished seat of The Manning. The member for The Hastings and The Macleay was Robert Davidson (Liberal Reform). The member for The Manning was John Thomson (Progressive) who unsuccessfully contested Gloucester.

=== The Hawkesbury ===
1904 New South Wales state election: The Hawkesbury
Party	Candidate	Votes	%	±%
Progressive	Brinsley Hall	3,058	51.2	
Liberal Reform	Thomas Kelly	2,918	48.8	
Total formal votes		5,976	99.2	
Informal votes		46	0.8	
Turnout		6,022	71.8	
Progressive hold				

The Hawkesbury lost part of the district to Sherbrooke and was expanded to include parts of Northumberland, and the abolished seat of The Nepean. The member for The Hawkesbury was Brinsley Hall (Progressive). The member for Northumberland was John Norton (Independent) who successfully contested Surry Hills. The member for The Nepean was Thomas Smith who unsuccessfully contested Sherbrooke.

=== Kahibah ===
1904 New South Wales state election: Kahibah
Party	Candidate	Votes	%	±%
Labour	Alfred Edden	1,966	87.4	
Independent Liberal	John Bailey	283	12.6	
Total formal votes		2,249	99.1	
Informal votes		21	0.9	
Turnout		2,270	31.6	
Labour hold				

Kahibah was expanded to include part of Waratah and the abolished seat of Newcastle West. The member for Kahibah was Alfred Edden (Labour). The member for Newcastle West was Owen Gilbert (Liberal Reform) who unsuccessfully contested Wickham while the member for Waratah was Matthew Charlton (Labour) who successfully contested Northumberland.

=== King ===
1904 New South Wales state election: King
Party	Candidate	Votes	%	±%
Liberal Reform	Ernest Broughton	2,154	48.6	
Progressive	Patrick Quinn	1,704	38.5	
Independent	Lindsay Thompson	385	8.7	
Independent Labour	Daniel Green	105	2.4	
Independent	John Lawler	57	1.3	
Independent Liberal	Henry Parr	15	0.3	
Independent	James Jones	9	0.2	
Total formal votes		4,429	97.3	
Informal votes		122	2.7	
Turnout		4,551	47.9	
Liberal Reform win		(new seat)		

King was a new seat which largely replaced the abolished seat of Sydney-King less a part lost to Darling Harbour. It was expanded to include parts of Sydney-Bligh and Sydney-Fitzroy. The member for Sydney-King was Ernest Broughton (Progressive), however he stood as a Liberal Reform candidate. The member for Sydney-Bligh was Patrick Quinn (Progressive). The member for Sydney-Fitzroy was Daniel Levy (Liberal Reform) who successfully contested Darlinghurst.

=== The Lachlan ===
1904 New South Wales state election: The Lachlan
Party	Candidate	Votes	%	±%
Labour	Andrew Kelly	1,525	36.8	
Liberal Reform	William Ferguson	1,394	33.6	
Independent Liberal	James Carroll	1,230	29.7	
Total formal votes		4,149	99.2	
Informal votes		34	0.8	
Turnout		4,183	63.9	
Labour gain from Progressive				

The Lachlan was one of two seats contested by 3 sitting members. The district lost parts to Cobar and The Murray and was expanded to absorb part of the abolished seats of Condoublin Grenfell. The member for the Lachlan was James Carroll (Progressive) who stood as Independent Liberal Reform candidate. The member for Condoublin was Patrick Clara (Labour) who unsuccessfully contested Ashburnum. The member for Grenfell was William Holman (Labour) who successfully contested Cootamundra. William Ferguson (Liberal Reform) was the Independent Labour member for Sturt while Andrew Kelly (Labour) was the member for the abolished seat of Sydney-Denison.

=== Lane Cove ===
1904 New South Wales state election: Lane Cove
Party	Candidate	Votes	%	±%
Liberal Reform	David Fell	3,395	65.8	
Labour	Sydney Hutton	1,765	34.2	
Total formal votes		5,160	99.6	
Informal votes		19	0.4	
Turnout		5,179	56.8	
Liberal Reform win		(new seat)		

Lane Cove was a new seat and consisted of parts St Leonards and the abolished seats of Ryde and Willoughby. the member for St Leonards was Edward Clark (Liberal Reform) who unsuccessfully contested that seat as an Independent Liberal Reform candidate. The member for Willoughby was Charles Wade (Liberal Reform) who successfully contested Gordon. The member for Ryde was Edward Terry (Independent) who did not contest the election.

=== Leichhardt ===
1904 New South Wales state election: Leichhardt
Party	Candidate	Votes	%	±%
Liberal Reform	Robert Booth	2,370	39.0	
Independent Liberal	John Hawthorne	1,980	32.6	
Labour	George Beeby	1,722	28.4	
Total formal votes		6,072	99.5	
Informal votes		28	0.5	
Turnout		6,100	70.5	
Liberal Reform hold				

Leichhardt was not significantly changed. John Hawthorne had been the Liberal Reform member for Leichhardt for 10 years, however stood as an Independent Liberal Reform Candidate, having been denied pre-selection in favour of Robert Booth, who had the support of the United Protestant Defence Association due to Hawthorne voting to grant money to various charities which included a Catholic orphanage.

=== Liverpool Plains ===
1904 New South Wales state election: Liverpool Plains
Party	Candidate	Votes	%	±%
Independent Liberal	John Perry (b 1849)	1,650	45.8	
Labour	David Hall	1,629	45.2	
Liberal Reform	George Nowland	323	9.0	
Total formal votes		3,602	98.9	
Informal votes		39	1.1	
Turnout		3,641	54.3	
Independent Liberal win		(new seat)		

Liverpool Plains was a re-established seat, comprising parts of the abolished seats of Gunnedah, Quirindi, and Wellington. The member for Gunnedah was David Hall (Labour). The member for Quirindi was Robert Levien (Progressive) who successfully contested Tamworth. The member for Wellington was John Haynes (Liberal Reform) who unsuccessfully contested Mudgee.

=== The Macquarie ===
1904 New South Wales state election: The Macquarie
Party	Candidate	Votes	%	±%
Labour	Thomas Thrower	2,566	50.2	
Liberal Reform	Simeon Phillips	2,476	48.5	
Independent	John Collins	38	0.7	
Independent Liberal	Reginald Atkinson	27	0.5	
Total formal votes		5,107	95.7	
Informal votes		230	4.3	
Turnout		5,337	63.2	
Labour win		(new seat)		

The Macquarie electorate retained nothing but the name, the former district being divided between Bathurst, Blayney and Hartley. The member for The Macquarie was William Hurley (Progressive) who was appointed to the Legislative Council. The district re-created in 1904 consisted of parts of the abolished seats of Dubbo and Wellington. The member for Dubbo was Simeon Phillips (Liberal Reform). The member for Wellington was John Haynes (Liberal Reform) who unsuccessfully contested Mudgee.

=== Maitland ===
1904 New South Wales state election: Maitland
Party	Candidate	Votes	%	±%
Progressive	John Gillies	2,803	51.5	
Liberal Reform	James Brunker	2,632	48.4	
Independent	David Mackenzie	4	0.1	
Total formal votes		5,439	98.7	
Informal votes		73	1.3	
Turnout		5,512	70.4	
Progressive win		(new seat)		

Maitland was a new seat comprising parts of the abolished seats of East Maitland and West Maitland. John Gillies was the Independent member for West Maitland, while James Brunker was the Liberal Reform member for East Maitland.

=== Marrickville ===
1904 New South Wales state election: Marrickville
Party	Candidate	Votes	%	±%
Liberal Reform	Richard McCoy	2,784	73.4	
Labour	Patrick MacManus	1,011	26.6	
Total formal votes		3,795	97.4	
Informal votes		102	2.6	
Turnout		3,897	49.1	
Liberal Reform hold				

Marrickville lost part of the district to Canterbury and Petersham and was expanded to include part of the abolished seat of Newtown-St Peters. The member for Marrickville was Richard McCoy (Liberal Reform). The member for Newtown-St Peters was James Fallick (Independent Liberal) who successfully contested Singleton as an official Liberal Reform candidate.

=== Middle Harbour ===
1904 New South Wales state election: Middle Harbour
Party	Candidate	Votes	%	±%
Liberal Reform	Richard Arthur	3,137	58.2	
Ind. Progressive	Ellison Quirk	2,207	41.0	
Socialist Labor	William Gocher	33	0.6	
Independent	Edgar Vanhee	13	0.2	
Total formal votes		5,390	99.3	
Informal votes		37	0.7	
Turnout		5,427	60.5	
Liberal Reform win		(new seat)		

Middle Harbour was a new seat and consisted of part of the abolished seat of Warringah and the balance of Warringah was included in St Leonards. The member for Warringah was Ellison Quirk (Independent).

=== Monaro ===
1904 New South Wales state election: Monaro
Party	Candidate	Votes	%	±%
Labour	Gus Miller	2,357	60.2	
Liberal Reform	John Perkins	1,116	28.5	
Independent	Henry Dawson	443	11.3	
Total formal votes		3,916	99.1	
Informal votes		37	0.9	
Turnout		3,953	65.2	
Labour hold				

Monaro was expanded to include parts of parts of Queanbeyan and the abolished seat of Eden-Bombala. The member for Monaro was Gus Miller (Labour). The member for Queanbeyan was Edward O'Sullivan (Progressive) who successfully contested Belmore. The member for Eden-Bombala was William Wood (Liberal Reform) who successfully contested Bega.

=== Mudgee ===
1904 New South Wales state election: Mudgee
Party	Candidate	Votes	%	±%
Progressive	Edwin Richards	2,731	50.1	
Liberal Reform	John Haynes	2,717	49.9	
Total formal votes		5,448	99.4	
Informal votes		33	0.6	
Turnout		5,481	70.7	
Progressive hold				

Mudgee was expanded to include part of the abolished seat of Wellington. The member for Mudgee was Edwin Richards (Progressive) and the member for Wellington was John Haynes (Liberal Reform).

=== The Murray ===
1904 New South Wales state election: The Murray
Party	Candidate	Votes	%	±%
Labour	Robert Scobie	1,936	58.3	
Independent Liberal	Robert Gibson	1,385	41.7	
Total formal votes		3,321	98.6	
Informal votes		49	1.5	
Turnout		3,370	50.5	
Labour win		(new seat)		

The Murray electorate retained nothing but the name, the former district being divided between Corowa and Deniliquin. The member for The Murray was James Hayes (Progressive) who was appointed to the Legislative Council and did not contest the election. The district re-created in 1904 consisted of the abolished seat of Wentworth and parts of The Lachlan and the abolished seat of Hay. The member for Wentworth was Robert Scobie (Labour). The member for The Lachlan was James Carroll (Progressive) who unsuccessfully contested that seat. The member for Hay was Frank Byrne who did not contest the election.

=== The Murrumbidgee ===
1904 New South Wales state election: The Murrumbidgee
Party	Candidate	Votes	%	±%
Labour	Patrick McGarry	1,538	30.0	
Progressive	Thomas Fitzpatrick	1,495	29.2	
Liberal Reform	Alick Smith	1,447	28.3	
Independent	Thomas Campbell	523	10.2	
Independent	Alfred Humby	116	2.3	
Total formal votes		5,119	99.0	
Informal votes		53	1.0	
Turnout		5,172	63.8	
Labour gain from Progressive				

The Murrumbidgee lost part of the district to Cootamundra and was expanded to include parts of the abolished seats of Hay and Wagga Wagga. The member for The Murrumbidgee was Thomas Fitzpatrick (Progressive). The member for Wagga Wagga James Gormly (Progressive) was appointed to the Legislative Council and did not contest the election. The member for Hay was Frank Byrne who did not contest the election. The member for The Barwon was William Willis (Progressive) who unsuccessfully contested The Darling.

=== The Namoi ===
1904 New South Wales state election: The Namoi
Party	Candidate	Votes	%	±%
Independent Liberal	Albert Collins	2,070	55.9	
Labour	Thomas Shakespeare	1,632	44.1	
Total formal votes		3,702	99.3	
Informal votes		28	0.8	
Turnout		3,730	57.7	
Independent Liberal win		(new seat)		

The Namoi was a re-created seat comprising the abolished seat of Narrabri as well as parts of the abolished seats of Gunnedah and The Barwon. The member for Narrabri was Albert Collins (Liberal Reform), who was not a member of Liberal Reform but was recommended by the party. The member for Gunnedah was David Hall (Labour) who unsuccessfully contested Liverpool Plains.

=== Newcastle ===
1904 New South Wales state election: Newcastle
Party	Candidate	Votes	%	±%
Liberal Reform	William Dick	2,477	50.5	
Independent	William Cann	2,429	49.5	
Total formal votes		4,906	99.3	
Informal votes		34	0.7	
Turnout		4,940	59.1	
Liberal Reform win		(new seat)		

Newcastle was a re-created seat that consisted of the abolished seat of Newcastle East and part of the abolished seat of Newcastle West. The member for Newcastle East was William Dick (Liberal Reform). The member for Newcastle West was Owen Gilbert (Liberal Reform) who unsuccessfully contested Wickham.

=== Newtown ===
1904 New South Wales state election: Newtown
Party	Candidate	Votes	%	±%
Labour	Robert Hollis	2,615	51.8	
Liberal Reform	Harold Morgan	2,411	47.7	
Socialist Labor	John Neill	27	0.5	
Total formal votes		5,053	99.3	
Informal votes		35	0.7	
Turnout		5,088	56.4	
Labour win		(new seat)		

Newtown was a re-created seat and consisted of parts of the abolished seats of Newtown-Erskine, Newtown-Camperdown and Newtown-St Peters. The member for Newtown-Erskine was Robert Hollis (Labour). The member for Newtown-Camperdown was James Smith (Independent Progressive) who successfully contested Camperdown. The member for Newtown-St Peters was James Fallick (Independent Liberal) who successfully contested Singleton as an official Liberal Reform candidate.

=== Northumberland ===
1904 New South Wales state election: Northumberland
Party	Candidate	Votes	%	±%
Labour	Matthew Charlton	2,009	54.9	
Independent Liberal	Reginald Harris	1,005	27.5	
Liberal Reform	John Fitzpatrick	543	14.9	
Independent	Alfred Jacques	60	1.6	
Total formal votes		3,657	98.2	
Informal votes		67	1.8	
Turnout		3,724	46.2	
Labour gain from Independent				

Northumberland lost part of the district to Hartley and The Hawkesbury and was expanded to include parts of the abolished seats of East Maitland, West Maitland and Wallsend. The member for Northumberland was John Norton (Independent) who successfully contested Surry Hills. The member for West Maitland, John Gillies (Independent), defeated the member for East Maitland, James Brunker (Liberal Reform), for Maitland. The member for Wallsend was John Estell (Labour) who successfully contested Waratah while the member for Waratah was Matthew Charlton (Labour). John Fitzpatrick was the member for Rylstone.

=== Orange ===
1904 New South Wales state election: Orange
Party	Candidate	Votes	%	±%
Labour	Albert Gardiner	2,090	43.0	
Liberal Reform	Samuel Whitmee	1,851	38.1	
Independent Liberal	Andrew Ross	918	18.9	
Total formal votes		4,859	99.2	
Informal votes		38	0.8	
Turnout		4,897	65.5	
Labour gain from Liberal Reform				

Orange lost part of the district to Belubula and was expanded to include part of the abolished seat of Molong. The member for Orange was Harry Newman (Liberal Reform) who died two months prior to the election. The member for Molong was Andrew Ross (Independent Liberal)

=== Paddington ===
1904 New South Wales state election: Paddington
Party	Candidate	Votes	%	±%
Liberal Reform	Charles Oakes	2,576	63.8	
Progressive	Thomas Bartholomew Curran	1,459	36.2	
Total formal votes		4,035	99.0	
Informal votes		43	1.1	
Turnout		4,078	46.2	
Liberal Reform hold				

Paddington lost part of the district to Darlinghurst and Woolahra and was expanded to include parts of Randwick and the abolished seat of Sydney-Bligh. The member for Paddington was Charles Oakes (Liberal Reform). The member for Randwick was David Storey (Liberal Reform) who successfully contested that seat. The member for Sydney-Bligh was Patrick Quinn (Progressive) who unsuccessfully contested King.

=== Parramatta ===
1904 New South Wales state election: Parramatta
Party	Candidate	Votes	%	±%
Liberal Reform	Tom Moxham	3,422	64.37	
Independent	William Ferris	1,849	34.78	
Labour	Charles Summerhayes	45	0.85	
Total formal votes		5,316	99.11	
Informal votes		48	0.89	
Turnout		5,364	68.06	
Liberal Reform hold				

Parramatta was expanded to include part of the abolished seat of Ryde. The member for Parramatta was Tom Moxham (Liberal Reform). The member for Ryde was Edward Terry (Independent Liberal) who did not contest the election.

=== Petersham ===
1904 New South Wales state election: Petersham
Party	Candidate	Votes	%	±%
Liberal Reform	John Cohen	2,940	60.6	
Independent Liberal	Henry Davis	1,897	39.1	
Progressive	Adam Pringle	13	0.3	
Total formal votes		4,850	99.2	
Informal votes		41	0.8	
Turnout		4,891	56.8	
Liberal Reform hold				

Petersham lost part of the district to Annandale, Ashfield and Canterbury and was expanded to include part of Marrickville. The member for Petersham was John Cohen (Liberal Reform). The member for Marrickville was Richard McCoy (Liberal Reform) who successfully contested that seat.

=== Phillip ===
1904 New South Wales state election: Phillip
Party	Candidate	Votes	%	±%
Labour	Phillip Sullivan	2,977	56.2	
Liberal Reform	Francis Boyce	2,120	40.0	
Independent Liberal	Samuel Wolfe	176	3.3	
Socialist Labor	Francis Drake	18	0.3	
Total formal votes		5,298	98.9	
Informal votes		59	1.1	
Turnout		5,357	59.1	
Labour win		(new seat)		

Phillip was a new seat and consisted of parts of the abolished seats of Sydney-Phillip and Darlington. The member for Darlington was Phillip Sullivan (Labour). The member for Sydney-Phillip was Daniel O'Connor (Progressive) who did not contest the election.

=== Pyrmont ===
1904 New South Wales state election: Pyrmont
Party	Candidate	Votes	%	±%
Labour	John McNeill	2,606	57.9	
Liberal Reform	John Harris	1,666	37.0	
Progressive	James Beer	169	3.8	
Socialist Labor	James Moroney	49	1.1	
Independent	Thomas Gollan	8	0.2	
Total formal votes		4,498	98.9	
Informal votes		52	1.1	
Turnout		4,550	54.8	
Labour win		(new seat)		

Pyrmont was a new seat and consisted of the abolished seat of Sydney-Pyrmont and part of the abolished seat of Sydney-Denison. The member for Sydney-Pyrmont was John McNeill (Labour). The member for Sydney-Denison was Andrew Kelly who successfully contested The Lachlan.

=== Queanbeyan ===
1904 New South Wales state election: Queanbeyan
Party	Candidate	Votes	%	±%
Liberal Reform	Alan Millard	2,328	52.0	
Progressive	Patrick Blackall	2,150	48.0	
Total formal votes		4,478	99.4	
Informal votes		29	0.6	
Turnout		4,507	69.0	
Liberal Reform gain from Progressive				

Queanbeyan lost part of the district to Monaro and was expanded to include parts of Yass and the abolished seat of Braidwood. The member for Queanbeyan was Edward O'Sullivan (Progressive) who successfully contested Belmore while the member for Yass was William Affleck (Liberal Reform) who unsuccessfully contested that seat. The member for Braidwood was Albert Chapman (Progressive) who did not contest the election.

=== Raleigh ===
1904 New South Wales state election: Raleigh
Party	Candidate	Votes	%	±%
Progressive	George Briner	2,173	58.1	
Liberal Reform	John Davis	1,099	29.4	
Independent	Thomas Lobban	471	12.6	
Total formal votes		3,743	99.4	
Informal votes		23	0.6	
Turnout		3,766	58.6	
Progressive hold				

Raleigh lost part of the district to The Clarence and was expanded to include much of The Clarence. The member for Raleigh was George Briner (Progressive). The member for The Clarence was John McFarlane (Progressive) who successfully contested that seat.

=== Randwick ===
1904 New South Wales state election: Randwick
Party	Candidate	Votes	%	±%
Liberal Reform	David Storey	2,235	75.7	
Independent	James O'Donnell	488	16.5	
Progressive	Thomas Armfield	134	4.5	
Independent	Samuel Kennedy	87	3.0	
Total formal votes		2,954	99.3	
Informal votes		22	0.7	
Turnout		2,976	39.6	
Liberal Reform hold				

Randwick lost parts of the district to Paddington, Surry Hills and Waverley and was expanded to include parts of Botany and Waverley. The member for Randwick was David Storey (Liberal Reform). The member for Botany was John Dacey (Labour) who successfully contested Alexandria. The member for Waverley was Thomas Jessep (Liberal Reform) who successfully contested that seat.

=== Redfern ===
1904 New South Wales state election: Redfern
Party	Candidate	Votes	%	±%
Labour	James McGowen	2,984	55.0	
Liberal Reform	George Howe	2,401	44.3	
Socialist Labor	Henry Ostler	40	0.7	
Total formal votes		5,425	98.7	
Informal votes		72	1.3	
Turnout		5,497	60.7	
Labour hold				

Redfern was expanded to include part of the abolished seat of Darlington. The member for Redfern was James McGowen (Labour). The member for Darlington was Phillip Sullivan (Labour) who successfully contested Phillip.

=== The Richmond ===
1904 New South Wales state election: The Richmond
Party	Candidate	Votes	%	±%
Progressive	John Perry (b 1845)	1,330	38.0	
Liberal Reform	Thomas Temperley	1,290	36.9	
Independent	Robert Campbell	763	21.8	
Independent Liberal	Philip Morton	117	3.3	
Total formal votes		3,500	99.0	
Informal votes		37	1.1	
Turnout		3,537	55.8	
Progressive hold				

The Richmond lost much of the district to Tenterfield and was expanded to include all of the abolished seat of Ballina and parts of the abolished seats of Lismore and The Tweed. The member for The Richmond was Robert Pyers (Progressive) who unsuccessfully contested Tenterfield. The member for Ballina was John Perry (b 1845). The member for Lismore was John Coleman (Liberal Reform) who successfully contested Rous, defeating the member for The Tweed, Richard Meagher (Independent), who stood as a Progressive candidate.

=== Rous ===
1904 New South Wales state election: Rous
Party	Candidate	Votes	%	±%
Liberal Reform	John Coleman	2,892	52.9	
Independent	Richard Meagher	2,577	47.1	
Total formal votes		5,469	99.4	
Informal votes		34	0.6	
Turnout		5,503	72.4	
Liberal Reform win		(new seat)		

Rous was a new district and consisted of parts of the abolished seats of Lismore and The Tweed. John Coleman (Liberal Reform) was the member for Lismore. Richard Meagher was the independent member for The Tweed.

=== Rozelle ===
1904 New South Wales state election: Rozelle
Party	Candidate	Votes	%	±%
Liberal Reform	Sydney Law	2,542	50.9	
Labour	James Mercer	2,450	49.1	
Total formal votes		4,992	98.9	
Informal votes		55	1.1	
Turnout		5,047	61.8	
Liberal Reform win		(new seat)		

Rozelle was a new seat that consisted of parts of the abolished set of Balmain South and Annandale. The member for Balmain South was Sydney Law who initially won that seat as a Labour candidate, before resigning and winning the seat as an Independent Labour candidate at the 1902 Balmain South by-election and contesting this election as an endorsed Liberal Reform candidate. The member for Annandale was William Mahony (Liberal Reform) who successfully contested that seat.

=== St George ===
1904 New South Wales state election: St George
Party	Candidate	Votes	%	±%
Liberal Reform	Sir Joseph Carruthers	3,068	71.8	
Labour	William Paine	1,207	28.2	
Total formal votes		4,275	99.3	
Informal votes		30	0.7	
Turnout		4,305	51.6	
Liberal Reform hold				

St George lost part of the district to Canterbury.

=== St Leonards ===
1904 New South Wales state election: St Leonards
Party	Candidate	Votes	%	±%
Liberal Reform	Thomas Creswell	2,164	49.8	
Independent Liberal	Edward Clark	1,630	37.5	
Labour	George Down	445	10.2	
Independent	Fountain Winter	99	2.3	
Independent Liberal	Charles Lloyd	10	0.2	
Independent	David Middleton	1	0.0	
Total formal votes		4,349	99.0	
Informal votes		45	1.0	
Turnout		4,394	55.9	
Liberal Reform hold				

St Leonards lost part of the district to Lane Cove and was expanded to include part of Warringah. The member for St Leonards was Edward Clark (Liberal Reform), who had defeated Thomas Creswell as an independent liberal candidate at the 1901 election. For 1904 Creswell was selected as the official Liberal candidate while Clark ran as an independent liberal candidate.

=== Sherbrooke ===
1904 New South Wales state election: Sherbrooke
Party	Candidate	Votes	%	±%
Liberal Reform	Broughton O'Conor	2,915	62.5	
Ind Progressive	Thomas Smith	1,194	25.6	
Independent Labour	Robert Lalor	549	11.8	
Independent	John McCook	7	0.2	
Total formal votes		4,665	99.0	
Informal votes		45	1.0	
Turnout		4,710	60.4	
Member changed to Liberal Reform from Independent				

Sherbrooke was expanded to include part of The Hawkesbury and parts of the abolished seats of The Nepean and Ryde and Willoughby. Broughton O'Conor (Liberal Reform) was the independent member for Sherbrooke while Thomas Smith (Progressive) was the member for The Nepean. The member for The Hawkesbury was Brinsley Hall (Progressive) who successfully contested that seat, the member for Willoughby was Charles Wade (Liberal Reform) who successfully contested the replacement seat of Gordon while the member for Ryde was Edward Terry (Independent) who did not contest the election.

=== Singleton ===
1904 New South Wales state election: Singleton
Party	Candidate	Votes	%	±%
Liberal Reform	James Fallick	2,106	50.9	
Progressive	Charles Dight	2,036	49.2	
Total formal votes		4,142	99.4	
Informal votes		24	0.6	
Turnout		4,166	69.2	
Liberal Reform gain from Progressive				

Singleton absorbed part of the seat of Northumberland and parts of the abolished seats of Robertson and Rylstone. The member for Northumberland was John Norton (Independent) who successfully contested Surry Hills, the member for Robertson was William Fleming (Liberal Reform) who successfully contested The Upper Hunter and the member for Rylstone was John Fitzpatrick (Liberal Reform) who unsuccessfully contested Northumberland. Charles Dight (Progressive) was the member for Singleton while James Fallick (Independent Liberal) was the member for Newtown-St Peters.

=== Sturt ===
1904 New South Wales state election: Sturt
Party	Candidate	Votes	%	±%
Labour	Arthur Griffith	2,658	67.1	
Independent	William Williams	1,304	32.9	
Total formal votes		3,962	98.9	
Informal votes		43	1.1	
Turnout		4,005	58.0	
Labour gain from Independent Labour				

Sturt absorbed part of the abolished seat of Alma and Rylstone. The member for Sturt was William Ferguson (Independent Labour) who unsuccessfully contested The Lachlan while William Williams (Independent Labour) was the member for Alma. Arthur Griffith (Labour) had previously been the member for Waratah however he resigned to unsuccessfully contest the 1903 federal election.

=== Surry Hills ===
1904 New South Wales state election: Surry Hills
Party	Candidate	Votes	%	±%
Independent	John Norton	2,646	45.8	
Liberal Reform	John Charles Waine	1,982	34.3	
Progressive	Arthur Nelson	513	8.9	
Independent Liberal	Richard Watkins Richards	403	7.0	
Independent	James Henry Lawrence	238	4.1	
Independent	James Bernard Black	2	0.0	
Total formal votes		5,784	98.7	
Informal votes		74	1.3	
Turnout		5,858	57.0	
Independent win		(new seat)		

Surry Hills was a new seat consisting of the abolished seat of Sydney-Flinders, which was expanded with part of Randwick and part of the abolished seat of Sydney-Cook. Arthur Nelson (Progressive) was the member for Sydney-Flinders while John Norton (Independent) was the member for Northumberland.

=== Tamworth ===
1904 New South Wales state election: Tamworth
Party	Candidate	Votes	%	±%
Progressive	Robert Levien	2,933	60.6	
Liberal Reform	John Garland	1,907	39.4	
Total formal votes		4,840	99.5	
Informal votes		27	0.6	
Turnout		4,867	70.2	
Progressive gain from Independent				

Tamworth was expanded to include part of the abolished seat of Quirindi. Raymond Walsh (Independent) had won the 1901 election for Tamworth, however he was made bankrupt in 1903 and was defeated in the subsequent by-election, by John Garland (Liberal Reform). Robert Levien (Progressive) was the member for Quirindi and had previously been one of two members for Tamworth from 1880 until 1894.

=== Tenterfield ===
1904 New South Wales state election: Tenterfield
Party	Candidate	Votes	%	±%
Liberal Reform	Charles Lee	2,247	56.3	
Progressive	Robert Pyers	1,742	43.7	
Total formal votes		3,989	99.3	
Informal votes		27	0.7	
Turnout		4,016	59.7	
Liberal Reform hold				

Tenterfield was expanded to include part of The Richmond. Charles Lee (Liberal Reform) was the member for Tenterfield while Robert Pyers (Progressive) was the member for The Richmond.

=== The Upper Hunter ===
1904 New South Wales state election: The Upper Hunter
Party	Candidate	Votes	%	±%
Liberal Reform	William Fleming	2,742	60.5	
Progressive	John Treflé	1,787	39.5	
Total formal votes		4,529	98.8	
Informal votes		54	1.2	
Turnout		4,583	68.3	
Liberal Reform hold				

The Upper Hunter was a re-created seat which comprised parts of the abolished seats of Robertson and Rylstone. William Fleming (Liberal Reform) was the member for Robertson and the member for Rylstone was John Fitzpatrick (Liberal Reform) who unsuccessfully contested Northumberland.

=== Waratah ===
1904 New South Wales state election: Waratah
Party	Candidate	Votes	%	±%
Labour	John Estell	2,112	80.6	
Liberal Reform	Charles Turner	508	19.4	
Total formal votes		2,620	99.1	
Informal votes		23	0.9	
Turnout		2,643	37.1	
Labour hold				

Waratah lost parts of the seat to Wickham and Kahibah and was expanded to include part of the abolished seats of East Maitland and Wallsend. John Estell (Labour) was the member for Wallsend. The member for Waratah was Matthew Charlton (Labour) who successfully contested Northumberland while the member for East Maitland, James Brunker (Liberal Reform), unsuccessfully contested Maitland.

=== Waverley ===
1904 New South Wales state election: Waverley
Party	Candidate	Votes	%	±%
Liberal Reform	Thomas Jessep	2,630	63.0	
Labour	Alfred Warton	1,080	25.9	
Independent Liberal	James Conroy	467	11.2	
Total formal votes		4,177	99.2	
Informal votes		35	0.8	
Turnout		4,212	48.3	
Liberal Reform hold				

Waverley lost part of the seat to Randwick and was expanded to include parts of Woollahra and Randwick. The member for Waverley was Thomas Jessep (Liberal Reform). The member for Randwick was David Storey (Liberal Reform) while the member for Woollahra was William Latimer and each retained their respective seats.

=== Wickham ===
1904 New South Wales state election: Wickham
Party	Candidate	Votes	%	±%
Progressive	John Fegan	2,344	39.8	
Liberal Reform	Owen Gilbert	1,900	32.2	
Labour	Laurence Vial	1,650	28.0	
Total formal votes		5,894	99.6	
Informal votes		22	0.4	
Turnout		5,916	70.2	
Progressive hold				

Wickham was expanded to include part of Waratah and part of the abolished seat of Newcastle West. John Fegan (Progressive) was the member for Wickham while Owen Gilbert (Liberal Reform) was the member for Newcastle West.

=== Wollondilly ===
1904 New South Wales state election: Wollondilly
Party	Candidate	Votes	%	±%
Liberal Reform	William McCourt	2,266	55.2	
Independent Liberal	Sidney Innes-Noad	1,824	44.4	
Independent	Theodore Corby	16	0.4	
Total formal votes		4,106	98.9	
Informal votes		44	1.1	
Turnout		4,150	57.4	
Liberal Reform win		(new seat)		

Wollondilly was a new seat comprising parts of the abolished seats of Bowral and Argyle and parts of Camden and Hartley. William McCourt (Liberal Reform) was the member for Bowral. The member for Hartley was John Hurley (Independent) who successfully retained that seat. The member for Argyle was Thomas Rose (Liberal Reform) who unsuccessfully contested Belubula. The member for Camden was John Kidd (Progressive) who unsuccessfully contested Camden.

=== Wollongong ===
1904 New South Wales state election: Wollongong
Party	Candidate	Votes	%	±%
Labour	John Nicholson	3,126	55.5	
Liberal Reform	Edward Allen	2,511	44.5	
Total formal votes		5,637	99.3	
Informal votes		40	0.7	
Turnout		5,677	71.5	
Labour win		(new seat)		

Wollongong was a new seat comprising parts of the abolished seats of Woronora and Illawarra and was originally going to retain the name Woronora, John Nicholson (Labour) was the member for Woronora while Edward Allen (Liberal Reform) was the member for Illawarra.

=== Woollahra ===
1904 New South Wales state election: Woollahra
Party	Candidate	Votes	%	±%
Liberal Reform	William Latimer	2,272	74.5	
Independent	Robert Usher	776	25.5	
Total formal votes		3,048	98.6	
Informal votes		43	1.4	
Turnout		3,091	39.0	
Liberal Reform hold				

Woollahra lost part of the seat to Waverley and was expanded to include part of Paddington. William Latimer (Liberal Reform) was the member for Woollahra. The member for Paddington was Charles Oakes (Liberal Reform) who successfully contested that seat.

=== Wynyard ===
1904 New South Wales state election: Wynyard
Party	Candidate	Votes	%	±%
Progressive	Robert Donaldson	1,877	50.7	
Labour	William Johnson	1,265	34.2	
Liberal Reform	Robert Joyce	561	15.2	
Total formal votes		3,703	98.5	
Informal votes		56	1.5	
Turnout		3,759	58.9	
Progressive win		(new seat)		

Wynyard was a new seat, comprising all of the abolished seat of Tumut and part of the abolished seat of Gundagai. The member for Tumut was Robert Donaldson (Progressive) while the member for Gundagai was John Barnes (Progressive) who unsuccessfully contested Cootamundra.

=== Yass ===
1904 New South Wales state election: Yass
Party	Candidate	Votes	%	±%
Labour	Niels Nielsen	2,260	52.2	
Liberal Reform	William Affleck	2,052	47.4	
Progressive	Bernard Grogan	17	0.4	
Total formal votes		4,329	98.3	
Informal votes		77	1.8	
Turnout		4,406	67.0	
Labour gain from Liberal Reform				

Yass lost part of the electorate to Queanbeyan and was expanded to include parts of the abolished seats of Boorowa and West Macquarie. The member for Yass was William Affleck (Liberal Reform) while the member for Boorowa was Niels Nielsen (Labour). The member for West Macquarie was Paddy Crick (Progressive) who successfully contested Blayney.

== See also ==
- Candidates of the 1904 New South Wales state election
- Members of the New South Wales Legislative Assembly, 1904–1907
