= Electoral results for the district of Deniliquin =

Election result for Deniliquin, New South Wales, Australia

Deniliquin, an electoral district of the Legislative Assembly in the Australian state of New South Wales was created in 1894 and abolished in 1913.

Election	Member	Party
1894	John Chanter	Protectionist
1895	John Chanter	Protectionist
1898	John Chanter	Protectionist
1901	Joseph Evans	Ind. Progressive
1904	George Reynoldson	Independent
1907	Henry Peters	Labour
1910	Henry Peters	Labour

== Election results ==
=== Elections in the 1910s ===
==== 1910 ====
1910 New South Wales state election: Deniliquin
Party	Candidate	Votes	%	±%
Labour	Henry Peters	2,282	59.3	
Farmers and Settlers	Arthur Trethowan	1,566	40.7	
Total formal votes		3,848	98.5	
Informal votes		60	1.5	
Turnout		3,908	58.9	
Labour hold				

=== Elections in the 1900s ===
==== 1907 ====
1907 New South Wales state election: Deniliquin
Party	Candidate	Votes	%	±%
Labour	Henry Peters	1,958	48.1	
Liberal Reform	Hugh McKinney	1,536	37.7	
Independent	James Wallace	333	8.2	
Independent	George Perrin	246	6.0	
Total formal votes		4,073	97.6	
Informal votes		99	2.4	
Turnout		4,172	62.5	
Labour gain from Independent				

==== 1904 ====
1904 New South Wales state election: Deniliquin
Party	Candidate	Votes	%	±%
Independent	George Reynoldson	911	31.4	
Liberal Reform	John Lewis	789	27.2	
Ind. Progressive	James Wallace	546	18.8	
Progressive	Henry Jones	326	11.2	
Total formal votes		2,902	98.7	
Informal votes		37	1.3	
Turnout		2,939	46.3	
Independent gain from Ind. Progressive				

Deniliquin was expanded to include part of The Murray. The sitting member for Deniliquin was Joseph Evans (Independent Progressive) who died three weeks prior to the election. The member for The Murray was James Hayes (Progressive) who was appointed to the Legislative Council and did not contest the election.

==== 1901 ====
1901 New South Wales state election: Deniliquin
Party	Candidate	Votes	%	±%
Ind. Progressive	Joseph Evans	452	29.3	
Independent Liberal	John Lewis	331	21.4	
Ind. Progressive	Richard Eames	293	19.0	
Ind. Progressive	Patrick Fagan	219	14.2	
Independent	Hugh McKinney	148	9.6	
Ind. Progressive	Allen Lakeman	101	6.5	
Total formal votes		1,544	98.8	−0.4
Informal votes		19	1.2	+0.4
Turnout		1,563	56.1	+2.2
Ind. Progressive gain from Progressive				

The sitting member was John Chanter (Progressive) who did not contest the election as he had been elected in March 1901 to the federal seat of Riverina which included Deniliquin.

=== Elections in the 1890s ===
==== 1898 ====
1898 New South Wales colonial election: Deniliquin
Party	Candidate	Votes	%	±%
National Federal	John Chanter	958	75.5	
Independent	George Berryman	311	24.5	
Total formal votes		1,269	99.2	
Informal votes		10	0.8	
Turnout		1,279	53.9	
National Federal hold				

==== 1895 ====
1895 New South Wales colonial election: Deniliquin
Party	Candidate	Votes	%	±%
Protectionist	John Chanter	696	67.3	
Ind. Free Trade	George Chandler	331	32.0	
Independent Labour	William Burrell	8	0.8	
Total formal votes		1,035	97.9	
Informal votes		22	2.1	
Turnout		1,057	53.7	
Protectionist hold				

==== 1894 ====
1894 New South Wales colonial election: Deniliquin
Party	Candidate	Votes	%	±%
Protectionist	John Chanter	1,095	70.2	
Free Trade	George Chandler	465	29.8	
Total formal votes		1,560	98.5	
Informal votes		24	1.5	
Turnout		1,584	78.3	
Protectionist win		(new seat)		
