= Electoral results for the district of Rous =

Election results for Rous, New South Wales, Australia

Rous, an electoral district of the Legislative Assembly in the Australian state of New South Wales was created in 1904 and abolished in 1913.

Election	Member	Party
1904	John Coleman	Liberal Reform
1905 by	George Hindmarsh	Liberal Reform
1907	George Hindmarsh	Liberal Reform
1910	George Hindmarsh	Liberal Reform

== Election results ==
=== 1910 ===
1910 New South Wales state election: Rous
Party	Candidate	Votes	%	±%
Liberal Reform	George Hindmarsh	4,744	56.1	
Labour	Alfred Taylor	3,719	43.9	
Total formal votes		8,463	98.7	
Informal votes		111	1.3	
Turnout		8,574	68.3	
Liberal Reform hold				

=== 1907 ===
1907 New South Wales state election: Rous
Party	Candidate	Votes	%	±%
Liberal Reform	George Hindmarsh	3,454	52.3	
Independent	John Sheridan	2,020	30.6	
Independent	Richard Balmer	1,128	17.1	
Total formal votes		6,602	96.0	
Informal votes		277	4.0	
Turnout		6,879	68.5	
Liberal Reform hold				

=== 1905 by-election ===
1905 Rous by-election Saturday 11 February
Party	Candidate	Votes	%	±%
Liberal Reform	George Hindmarsh	2,832	51.1	−1.8
Independent	Richard Meagher	2,710	48.9	+1.8
Total formal votes		5,542	99.6	+0.2
Informal votes		24	0.4	−0.2
Turnout		5,566	73.2 (Note: based on an electoral roll of 7,600 at the 1904 election.)	+0.8
Liberal Reform hold		Swing		

John Coleman (Liberal Reform) died.

=== 1904 ===
1904 New South Wales state election: Rous
Party	Candidate	Votes	%	±%
Liberal Reform	John Coleman	2,892	52.9	
Independent	Richard Meagher	2,577	47.1	
Total formal votes		5,469	99.4	
Informal votes		34	0.6	
Turnout		5,503	72.4	
Liberal Reform win		(new seat)		

Rous was a new district and consisted of parts of the abolished seats of Lismore and The Tweed. John Coleman (Liberal Reform) was the member for Lismore. Richard Meagher was the independent member for The Tweed.
