= Electoral results for the district of Burrangong =

Election result for Burrangong, New South Wales, Australia

Burrangong, an electoral district of the Legislative Assembly in the Australian state of New South Wales was created in 1904 and abolished in 1920.

Election	Member	Party
1904	George Burgess	Labor
1907	George Burgess	Labor
1910	George Burgess	Labor
1913	George Burgess	Labor / Nationalist
1917	Peter Loughlin	Labor

== Election results ==
=== Elections in the 1910s ===
==== 1917 ====
1917 New South Wales state election: Burrangong
Party	Candidate	Votes	%	±%
Labor	Peter Loughlin	3,925	51.1	+0.8
Nationalist	George Burgess	3,760	48.9	+48.9
Total formal votes		7,685	99.0	+1.4
Informal votes		80	1.0	−1.4
Turnout		7,765	66.3	−1.2
Labor hold		Swing	+0.8	

The sitting member George Burgess was expelled from Labor in the November 1916 Labor split over conscription.

==== 1913 ====
1913 New South Wales state election: Burrangong
Party	Candidate	Votes	%	±%
Labor	George Burgess	3,803	50.3	
Farmers and Settlers	Arthur Trethowan (Note: Also endorsed by Liberal Reform.)	3,761	49.7	
Total formal votes		7,564	97.6	
Informal votes		187	2.4	
Turnout		7,751	67.5	
Labor hold				

==== 1910 ====
1910 New South Wales state election: Burrangong
Party	Candidate	Votes	%	±%
Labour	George Burgess	3,655	54.1	
Liberal Reform	James Carroll	3,103	45.9	
Total formal votes		6,758	98.2	
Informal votes		126	1.8	
Turnout		6,884	70.3	
Labour hold				

=== Elections in the 1900s ===
==== 1907 ====
1907 New South Wales state election: Burrangong
Party	Candidate	Votes	%	±%
Labour	George Burgess	3,086	52.7	
Liberal Reform	Hector McWilliam	2,771	47.3	
Total formal votes		5,857	97.9	
Informal votes		124	2.1	
Turnout		5,981	72.8	
Labour hold				

==== 1904 ====
1904 New South Wales state election: Burrangong
Party	Candidate	Votes	%	±%
Labour	George Burgess	2,892	54.4	
Liberal Reform	Arthur Grimm	2,427	45.6	
Total formal votes		5,319	98.8	
Informal votes		65	1.2	
Turnout		5,384	69.6	
Labour win		(new seat)		

Burrangong was a new seat consisting of parts of the abolished seats of Boorowa, Grenfell and Young, each of which were held by the Labour Party. The member for Young was George Burgess. The member for Boorowa was Niels Nielsen who successfully contested Yass and the member for Grenfell was William Holman who successfully contested Cootamundra.
