= Electoral results for the district of Surry Hills =

Election results for Surry Hills, New South Wales, Australia

Surry Hills, an electoral district of the Legislative Assembly in the Australian state of New South Wales had two incarnations, from 1904 until 1920 and from 1927 until 1930.

| Election | Member | Party |
|---|---|---|
| 1904 | John Norton | Independent |
| 1907 by | Albert Bruntnell | Liberal Reform |
| 1907 | Sir James Graham | Liberal Reform |
| 1910 | Henry Hoyle | Labour |
| 1913 | Henry Hoyle | Labour |
| 1917 | Henry Hoyle | Nationalist |
| Election | Member | Party |
| 1927 | Arthur Buckley | Labor |

== Election results ==
=== Elections in the 1920s ===
==== 1927 ====
1927 New South Wales state election: Surry Hills
| Party | Candidate | Votes | % | ±% |
|---|---|---|---|---|
| Labor | Tom Shannon | 7,536 | 66.1 | |
| Nationalist | William Adkins | 3,694 | 32.4 | |
| Independent | John Salmon | 175 | 1.5 | |
| Total formal votes | | 11,405 | 98.6 | |
| Informal votes | | 164 | 1.4 | |
| Turnout | | 11,569 | 76.7 | |
| Labor win | | (new seat) | | |

District recreated

==== 1920 - 1927 ====
District abolished

=== Elections in the 1910s ===
==== 1917 ====
1917 New South Wales state election: Surry Hills
| Party | Candidate | Votes | % | ±% |
|---|---|---|---|---|
| Labor | Arthur Buckley | 3,585 | 65.5 | −0.1 |
| Nationalist | Percy Daly | 1,550 | 28.3 | +28.3 |
| Independent | Thomas Kohan | 272 | 5.0 | +5.0 |
| Independent | John Eaton | 39 | 0.7 | +0.7 |
| Ind. Socialist Labor | Ludwig Klausen | 26 | 0.5 | +0.5 |
| Total formal votes | | 5,472 | 98.8 | +0.5 |
| Informal votes | | 66 | 1.2 | −0.5 |
| Turnout | | 5,538 | 47.1 | −12.9 |
| Labor hold | | Swing | −0.1 | |

The sitting member Henry Hoyle (Nationalist) was expelled from Labor in the November 1916 Labor split over conscription, and did not contest the election.

==== 1913 ====
1913 New South Wales state election: Surry Hills
| Party | Candidate | Votes | % | ±% |
|---|---|---|---|---|
| Labor | Henry Hoyle | 4,717 | 65.6 | |
| Independent | William Walker | 2,393 | 33.3 | |
| Socialist Labor | Ludwig Klausen | 82 | 1.1 | |
| Total formal votes | | 7,192 | 98.3 | |
| Informal votes | | 123 | 1.7 | |
| Turnout | | 7,315 | 60.0 | |
| Labor hold | | | | |

==== 1910 ====
1910 New South Wales state election: Surry Hills
| Party | Candidate | Votes | % | ±% |
|---|---|---|---|---|
| Labour | Henry Hoyle | 3,711 | 60.4 | +25.1 |
| Liberal Reform | Sir James Graham (defeated) | 2,399 | 39.0 | +1.7 |
| Independent | John Eaton | 38 | 0.6 | |
| Total formal votes | | 6,148 | 97.0 | +0.7 |
| Informal votes | | 191 | 3.0 | −0.7 |
| Turnout | | 6,339 | 67.6 | −0.8 |
| Labour gain from Liberal Reform | | | | |

==== 1907 ====
1907 New South Wales state election: Surry Hills
| Party | Candidate | Votes | % | ±% |
|---|---|---|---|---|
| Liberal Reform | Sir James Graham | 2,227 | 37.3 | |
| Labour | John Birt | 2,104 | 35.3 | |
| Independent | Paddy Crick | 1,442 | 24.2 | |
| Independent | George Perry | 194 | 3.3 | |
| Total formal votes | | 5,967 | 96.3 | |
| Informal votes | | 230 | 3.7 | |
| Turnout | | 6,197 | 68.4 | |
| Liberal Reform gain from Independent | | | | |

John Norton (Independent) had won the seat at the 1904 election, however he challenged William Holman to face a by-election and was soundly defeated at the Surry Hills by-election in July 1906, finishing fourth behind Albert Bruntnell (Liberal Reform). At the 1907 general election Bruntnell chose to contest Alexandria but the seat was retained for Liberal Reform by Sir James Graham.

==== 1906 by-election ====
1906 Surry Hills by-election Saturday 21 July
| Party | Candidate | Votes | % | ±% |
|---|---|---|---|---|
| Liberal Reform | Albert Bruntnell (elected) | 1,109 | 30.5 | −3.8 |
| Independent | Dick Meagher | 961 | 26.4 | |
| Labour | Henry Lawton | 888 | 24.4 | |
| Independent | John Norton (defeated) | 679 | 18.7 | −27.1 |
| Independent | James Jones | 3 | 0.1 | |
| Total formal votes | | 3,640 | 98.9 | +0.2 |
| Informal votes | | 40 | 1.1 | −0.2 |
| Turnout | | 3,680 | 36.2 (Note: Estimate based on an electoral roll of 10,172 at the 1904 election.) | −20.8 |
| Liberal Reform gain from Independent | | Swing | | |

John Norton (Independent) challenged William Holman to resign and both would contest Holman's seat of Cootamundra.

==== 1904 ====
1904 New South Wales state election: Surry Hills
| Party | Candidate | Votes | % | ±% |
|---|---|---|---|---|
| Independent | John Norton | 2,646 | 45.8 | |
| Liberal Reform | John Charles Waine | 1,982 | 34.3 | |
| Progressive | Arthur Nelson | 513 | 8.9 | |
| Independent Liberal | Richard Watkins Richards | 403 | 7.0 | |
| Independent | James Henry Lawrence | 238 | 4.1 | |
| Independent | James Bernard Black | 2 | 0.0 | |
| Total formal votes | | 5,784 | 98.7 | |
| Informal votes | | 74 | 1.3 | |
| Turnout | | 5,858 | 57.0 | |
| Independent win | | (new seat) | | |

Surry Hills was a new seat consisting of the abolished seat of Sydney-Flinders, which was expanded with part of Randwick and part of the abolished seat of Sydney-Cook. Arthur Nelson (Progressive) was the member for Sydney-Flinders while John Norton (Independent) was the member for Northumberland.
