= Electoral results for the district of Camperdown =

Election results for Camperdown, New South Wales, Australia

Camperdown, an electoral district of the Legislative Assembly in the Australian state of New South Wales was created in 1894 and abolished in 1920.

Election	Member	Party
1904	James Smith	Progressive
1907	Robert Stuart-Robertson	Labor
1910	Robert Stuart-Robertson	Labor
1913	Robert Stuart-Robertson	Labor
1917	Robert Stuart-Robertson	Labor

== Election results ==
=== Elections in the 1910s ===
==== 1917 ====
1917 New South Wales state election: Camperdown
Party	Candidate	Votes	%	±%
Labor	Robert Stuart-Robertson	3,930	65.9	−1.4
Nationalist	William Weller	1,980	33.2	+0.5
Ind. Socialist Labor	Arthur Reardon	56	0.9	+0.9
Total formal votes		5,966	98.8	+0.9
Informal votes		74	1.2	+0.9
Turnout		6,040	53.9	−12.7
Labor hold		Swing	−1.4	

==== 1913 ====
1913 New South Wales state election: Camperdown
Party	Candidate	Votes	%	±%
Labor	Robert Stuart-Robertson	5,032	67.3	
Liberal Reform	William McMahon	2,446	32.7	
Total formal votes		7,478	97.9	
Informal votes		161	2.1	
Turnout		7,639	66.6	
Labor hold				

==== 1910 ====
1910 New South Wales state election: Camperdown
Party	Candidate	Votes	%	±%
Labour	Robert Stuart-Robertson	4,361	63.4	
Liberal Reform	Thomas Jessep	2,518	32.6	
Total formal votes		6,879	98.0	
Informal votes		140	2.0	
Turnout		7,019	68.3	
Labour hold				

=== Elections in the 1900s ===
==== 1907 ====
1907 New South Wales state election: Camperdown
Party	Candidate	Votes	%	±%
Labour	Robert Stuart-Robertson	3,377	51.7	
Liberal Reform	William Clegg	2,860	43.8	+15.5
Former Progressive	James Smith (defeated)	294	4.5	
Total formal votes		6,531	98.2	
Informal votes		123	1.9	
Turnout		6,654	73.1	
Labour gain from Progressive				

==== 1904 ====
1904 New South Wales state election: Camperdown
Party	Candidate	Votes	%	±%
Progressive	James Smith	1,841	38.5	
Liberal Reform	William Clegg	1,352	28.3	
Independent Liberal	John Salmon	881	18.4	
Independent	Alfred Levy	352	7.4	
Independent	George Sparkes	203	4.3	
Independent Labour	Donald McCulloch	138	2.9	
Independent	John Kelly	13	0.27	
Total formal votes		4,780	98.4	
Informal votes		76	1.6	
Turnout		4,856	55.7	
Progressive win		(new seat)		

Camperdown was a new seat consisting of parts of Annandale and the abolished seats of Newtown-Camperdown, Darlington, Newtown-Camperdown and Newtown-Erskine. James Smith (Progressive) was the member for Newtown-Camperdown. There was a battle for the Liberal pre-selection between William Clegg and John Salmon, with Salmon withdrawing from the process and standing as an independent, splitting the liberal vote.
