= Electoral results for the district of Hay =

Election results for Hay, New South Wales, Australia

Hay, an electoral district of the Legislative Assembly in the Australian state of New South Wales was created in 1894 and abolished in 1920.

| Election | Member | Party |
|---|---|---|
| 1894 | James Ashton | Free Trade |
| 1895 | James Ashton | Free Trade |
| 1898 | Frank Byrne | Free Trade |
| 1901 | Frank Byrne | Independent |

== Election results ==
=== Elections in the 1900s ===
==== 1901 ====
1901 New South Wales state election: Hay
| Party | Candidate | Votes | % | ±% |
|---|---|---|---|---|
| Independent | Frank Byrne | unopposed | | |
| Member changed to Independent from Liberal Reform | | | | |

=== Elections in the 1890s ===
==== 1898 ====
1898 New South Wales colonial election: Hay
| Party | Candidate | Votes | % | ±% |
|---|---|---|---|---|
| Free Trade | Frank Byrne | 520 | 53.0 | |
| National Federal | James Newton | 249 | 25.4 | |
| Independent Federalist | Allen Lakeman | 212 | 21.6 | |
| Total formal votes | | 981 | 99.2 | |
| Informal votes | | 8 | 0.8 | |
| Turnout | | 989 | 48.2 | |
| Free Trade hold | | | | |

==== 1895 ====
1895 New South Wales colonial election: Hay
| Party | Candidate | Votes | % | ±% |
|---|---|---|---|---|
| Free Trade | James Ashton | 556 | 61.3 | |
| Protectionist | James Newton | 351 | 38.7 | |
| Total formal votes | | 907 | 98.5 | |
| Informal votes | | 14 | 1.5 | |
| Turnout | | 921 | 50.8 | |
| Free Trade hold | | | | |

==== 1894 ====
1894 New South Wales colonial election: Hay
| Party | Candidate | Votes | % | ±% |
|---|---|---|---|---|
| Free Trade | James Ashton | 475 | 37.8 | |
| Protectionist | James Newton | 383 | 30.5 | |
| Ind. Free Trade | George Mair | 219 | 17.4 | |
| Ind. Protectionist | Allen Lakeman | 178 | 14.2 | |
| Independent | Charles Broom | 2 | 0.2 | |
| Total formal votes | | 1,257 | 98.3 | |
| Informal votes | | 22 | 1.7 | |
| Turnout | | 1,279 | 70.2 | |
| Free Trade win | | (new seat) | | |
