= Electoral results for the district of Sydney-Cook =

Election results for Sydney-Cook, New South Wales, Australia

Sydney-Cook, an electoral district of the Legislative Assembly in the Australian state of New South Wales, was created in 1894 and abolished in 1904.

| Election | Member | Party |
|---|---|---|
| 1894 | Samuel Whiddon | Free Trade |
| 1895 | Samuel Whiddon | Free Trade |
| 1898 | Samuel Whiddon | Free Trade |
| 1901 | Samuel Whiddon | Liberal Reform |

== Election results ==
=== Elections in the 1900s ===
==== 1901 ====
1901 New South Wales state election: Sydney-Cook
| Party | Candidate | Votes | % | ±% |
|---|---|---|---|---|
| Liberal Reform | Samuel Whiddon | 665 | 41.2 | −11.0 |
| Progressive | George Perry | 623 | 38.6 | −7.5 |
| Independent | John Griffin | 170 | 10.5 | |
| Labour | Philip Mulholland | 135 | 8.4 | |
| Ind. Progressive | William Hart | 17 | 1.1 | |
| Independent | Henry Cato | 4 | 0.3 | |
| Total formal votes | | 1,614 | 99.3 | −0.1 |
| Informal votes | | 11 | 0.7 | +0.1 |
| Turnout | | 1,625 | 64.4 | +7.3 |
| Liberal Reform hold | | | | |

=== Elections in the 1890s ===
==== 1898 ====
1898 New South Wales colonial election: Sydney-Cook
| Party | Candidate | Votes | % | ±% |
|---|---|---|---|---|
| Free Trade | Samuel Whiddon | 593 | 52.2 | |
| National Federal | George Lewis | 524 | 46.1 | |
| Independent | Daniel Healey | 17 | 1.5 | |
| Independent | Suleman Amein | 3 | 0.3 | |
| Total formal votes | | 1,137 | 99.4 | |
| Informal votes | | 7 | 0.6 | |
| Turnout | | 1,144 | 57.1 | |
| Free Trade hold | | | | |

==== 1895 ====
1895 New South Wales colonial election: Sydney-Cook
| Party | Candidate | Votes | % | ±% |
|---|---|---|---|---|
| Free Trade | Samuel Whiddon | 586 | 54.8 | |
| Protectionist | William Traill | 484 | 45.2 | |
| Total formal votes | | 1,070 | 99.8 | |
| Informal votes | | 2 | 0.2 | |
| Turnout | | 1,072 | 63.4 | |
| Free Trade hold | | | | |

==== 1894 ====
1894 New South Wales colonial election: Sydney-Cook
| Party | Candidate | Votes | % | ±% |
|---|---|---|---|---|
| Free Trade | Samuel Whiddon | 649 | 46.4 | |
| Protectionist | William Traill | 473 | 33.8 | |
| Labour | James Watson | 276 | 19.7 | |
| Total formal votes | | 1,398 | 99.4 | |
| Informal votes | | 8 | 0.6 | |
| Turnout | | 1,406 | 81.3 | |
| Free Trade win | | (new seat) | | |
