= Electoral results for the district of Balmain South =

Election results for Balmain South, New South Wales, Australia

Balmain South, an electoral district of the Legislative Assembly in the Australian state of New South Wales was created in 1894 and abolished in 1904.

Election	Member	Party
1894	Sydney Law	Labour
1895	Sydney Law	Labour
1898	Sydney Law	Labour
1901	Sydney Law	Labour
1902 by	Sydney Law	Independent Labour

== Election results ==
=== Elections in the 1900s ===
==== 1902 by-election ====
1902 Balmain South by-election Wednesday 16 August
Party	Candidate	Votes	%	±%
Independent Labour	Sydney Law (re-elected)	1,387	57.9	
Labour	Hugh Byers	1,006	42.1	
Total formal votes		2,388	99.3	+0.3
Informal votes		16	0.7	−0.3
Turnout		2,404	58.9 (Note: based on a roll of 4,082 at the 1901 election.)	−10.1
Member changed to Independent Labour from Labour				

Sydney Law resigned from Labour and the parliament, recontesting the seat as an Independent Labour candidate.

==== 1901 ====
1901 New South Wales state election: Balmain South
Party	Candidate	Votes	%	±%
Labour	Sydney Law	1,413	50.7	+3.7
Independent Liberal	John Gray	871	31.2	
Liberal Reform	Charles Donnelley	389	14.0	
Ind. Progressive	Percy Tighe	80	2.9	
Independent	William Pacey	30	1.1	
Independent	Robert Morris	5	0.2	
Total formal votes		2,788	99.0	−0.5
Informal votes		27	1.0	+0.5
Turnout		2,815	69.0	+4.1
Labour hold				

=== Elections in the 1890s ===
==== 1898 ====
1898 New South Wales colonial election: Balmain South
Party	Candidate	Votes	%	±%
Labour	Sydney Law	979	47.0	
National Federal	William Traill	861	41.3	
Independent Federalist	Gilbert Murdoch	174	8.4	
Independent	Charles Taylor	70	3.4	
Total formal votes		2,084	99.5	
Informal votes		10	0.5	
Turnout		2,094	64.9	
Labour hold				

==== 1895 ====
1895 New South Wales colonial election: Balmain South
Party	Candidate	Votes	%	±%
Labour	Sydney Law	901	49.8	
Ind. Protectionist	James Johnston	601	33.2	
Ind. Free Trade	George Clubb	197	10.9	
Protectionist	Osborne Chidgey	111	6.1	
Total formal votes		1,810	98.8	
Informal votes		22	1.2	
Turnout		1,832	71.4	
Labour hold				

==== 1894 ====
1894 New South Wales colonial election: Balmain South
Party	Candidate	Votes	%	±%
Labour	Sydney Law	775	34.7	
Protectionist	James Johnston	727	32.5	
Free Trade	George Clubb	716	32.1	
Ind. Free Trade	George Maclean	16	0.7	
Total formal votes		2,234	98.2	
Informal votes		41	1.8	
Turnout		2,275	83.7	
Labour win		(new seat)		
