= 1905 Rous state by-election =

Election result for Rous, New South Wales, Australia

A by-election was held in the New South Wales state electoral district of Rous on 11 February 1905. The by-election was triggered by the death of John Coleman (Liberal Reform).

== Dates ==
Date	Event
8 January 1905	John Coleman died.
16 January 1905	Writ of election issued by the Speaker of the Legislative Assembly.
31 January 1905	Nominations
11 February 1905	Polling day
2 March 1905	Return of writ

== Result ==
1905 Rous by-election Saturday 11 February
Party	Candidate	Votes	%	±%
Liberal Reform	George Hindmarsh	2,832	51.1	−1.8
Independent	Richard Meagher	2,710	48.9	+1.8
Total formal votes		5,542	99.6	+0.2
Informal votes		24	0.4	−0.2
Turnout		5,566	73.2 (Note: based on an electoral roll of 7,600 at the 1904 election.)	+0.8
Liberal Reform hold		Swing		

== See also ==
- Electoral results for the district of Rous
- List of New South Wales state by-elections
