= 1904 New South Wales state election =

Colonial election for New South Wales, Australia in August 1904

- 6 August 1904

All 90 seats in the New South Wales Legislative Assembly 46 Assembly seats were needed for a majority

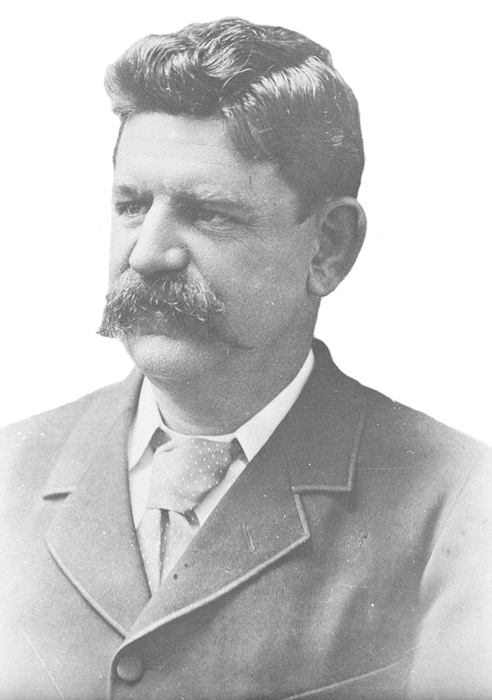

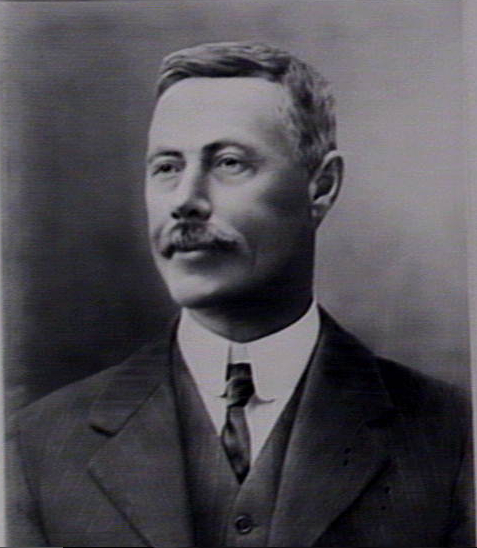
	First party	Second party	Third party
Leader	Sir Joseph Carruthers	James McGowen	Thomas Waddell
Party	Liberal Reform	Labor Electoral League	Progressive
Leader since	18 September 1902	August 1894	15 June 1904
Leader's seat	St George	Redfern	Cowra (contesting Belubula)
Last election	37 seats	24 seats	42 seats
Seats won	45 seats	25 seats	16 seats
Seat change	▲8	▲1	▼26
Percentage	44.58%	23.30%	18.98%
Swing	▲11.03	▲4.86	▼4.01
- Legislative Assembly after the election
Premier before election
Thomas Waddell
Progressive
Elected Premier
Sir Joseph Carruthers
Liberal Reform

The 1904 New South Wales state election was held on 6 August 1904 for all of the 90 seats in the 20th New South Wales Legislative Assembly and it was conducted in single-member constituencies with a first past the post voting system. For the first time, women were entitled to vote. Both adult males and females were entitled to vote, but not Indigenous people. The 19th parliament of New South Wales was dissolved on 16 July 1904 by the Governor, Sir Harry Rawson, on the advice of the Premier, Thomas Waddell.

This election saw the size of the Legislative Assembly reduced from 125 to 90 seats as a result of the 1903 New South Wales referendum.

== Key dates ==
Date	Event
16 July 1904	The Legislative Assembly was dissolved, and writs were issued by the Governor to proceed with an election.
26 July 1904	Nominations for candidates for the election closed at noon.
6 August 1904	Polling day.
23 August 1904	Opening of 20th Parliament.
29 August 1904	Carruthers ministry sworn in.

== Results ==
New South Wales state election, 6 August 1904 Legislative Assembly << 1901–1907 >>
Enrolled voters	689,490				
Votes cast	396,622		Turnout	59.31	−3.53
Informal votes	3,973		Informal	0.99	+0.21
Summary of votes by party
Party	Primary votes	%	Swing	Seats	Change
Liberal Reform	176,796	44.58	+11.03	45	+8
Labour	92,426	23.30	+4.86	25	+1
Progressive	75,297	18.98	−4.01	16	−26
Independent	25,605	6.46	−4.62	2	−10
Independent Liberal	21,189	5.34	−3.26	2	−2
Other	5,309	1.34	−4.01	0	−6
Total				90	-35

Popular vote
Liberal Reform	44.58%
Labor	23.30%
Progressive	18.98%
Independent	6.46%
Ind. Liberal	5.34%
Others	1.34%
Parliamentary seats
Liberal Reform	45
Labor	25
Progressive	16
Independent	2
Ind. Liberal	2

== Retiring members ==
Orange Liberal MLA Harry Newman died on 1 June. Deniliquin Independent MLA Joseph Evans died on 5 July. Due to the proximity of the election, no by-elections were held.

=== Progressive ===
- Albert Chapman MLA (Braidwood)
- William Davis MLA (Bourke)
- James Gormly MLA (Wagga Wagga) — appointed to the Legislative Council.
- James Hayes MLA (Murray) — appointed to the Legislative Council.
- William Hurley MLA (Macquarie) — appointed to the Legislative Council.
- Daniel O'Connor MLA (Sydney-Phillip)
- Sir John See MLA (Grafton) — appointed to the Legislative Council.

=== Liberal ===
- Samuel Whiddon MLA (Sydney-Cook)

=== Labor ===
- John Power MLA (Sydney-Lang) — lost preselection

=== Independent ===
- Frank Byrne MLA (Hay)
- Thomas Griffith MLA (Albury)
- Edward Terry MLA (Ryde)

== See also ==
- Candidates of the 1904 New South Wales state election
- Members of the New South Wales Legislative Assembly, 1904–1907
