= 1906 Surry Hills state by-election =

Election result for Surry Hills, New South Wales, Australia

- 21 July 1906

Electoral district of Surry Hills in the Legislative Assembly of New South Wales
- Turnout: 36.2% (▼20.8%)
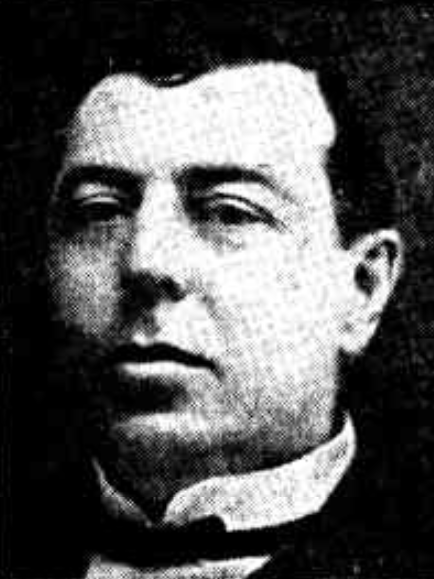

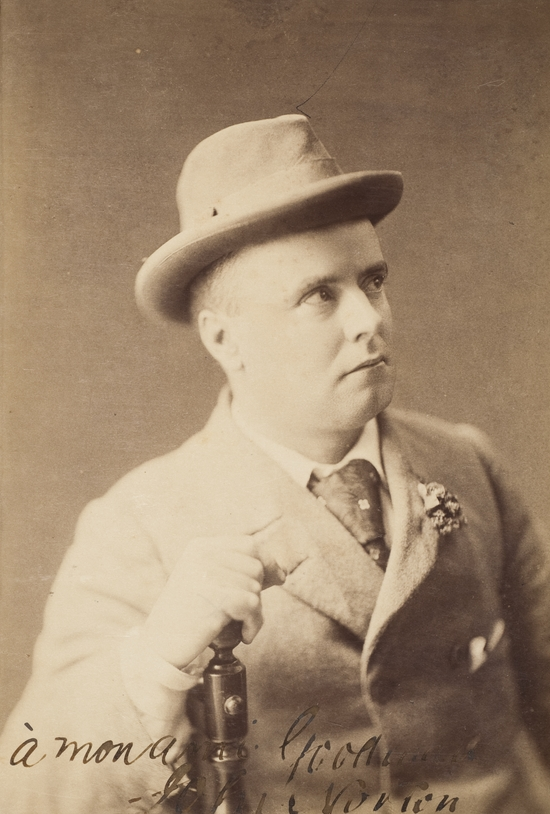
	First party	Second party
	LRP
Candidate	Albert Bruntnell	Dick Meagher
Party	Liberal Reform	Independent
Popular vote	1,109	961
Percentage	30.5%	26.4%
Swing	▼3.8%	▲26.4
	Third party	Fourth party
	ALP
Candidate	Henry Lawton	John Norton
Party	Labour	Independent
Popular vote	888	697
Percentage	24.4%	18.7%
Swing	▲24.4	▼27.1%
MLA before election
John Norton
Independent
Elected MLA
Albert Bruntnell
Liberal Reform

A by-election was held for the New South Wales Legislative Assembly electorate of Surry Hills on 21 July 1906 because of the resignation of John Norton (Independent). Norton blamed William Holman for an article in The Worker commenting on Norton's unnatural silence over the land scandals involving Paddy Crick and William Willis. Norton made a personal attack on Holman in parliament, challenging him to resign and both would contest Holman's seat of Cootamundra.

== Dates ==
Date	Event
5 July 1906	John Norton resigned.
6 July 1906	Writ of election issued by the Speaker of the Legislative Assembly and close of electoral rolls.
14 July 1906	Nominations
21 July 1906	Polling day
31 July 1906	Return of writ

== Result ==
1906 Surry Hills state by-election
Party	Candidate	Votes	%	±%
Liberal Reform	Albert Bruntnell (elected)	1,109	30.5	−3.8
Independent	Dick Meagher	961	26.4	
Labour	Henry Lawton	888	24.4	
Independent	John Norton (defeated)	679	18.7	−27.1
Independent	James Jones	3	0.1	
Total formal votes		3,640	98.9	+0.2
Informal votes		40	1.1	−0.2
Turnout		3,680	36.2 (Note: Estimate based on an electoral roll of 10,172 at the 1904 election.)	−20.8
Liberal Reform gain from Independent		Swing		

== Aftermath ==
The Cootamundra by-election was held the following week, however Norton withdrew from the contest. H. V. Evatt argues that the most likely explanation for Norton's attack was to remove Labour's best debater at a critical time. Norton returned to parliament at the 1907 election for Darling Harbour.

== See also ==
- Electoral results for the district of Surry Hills
- List of New South Wales state by-elections
