= 1902 Balmain South state by-election =

Election result for Balmain South, New South Wales, Australia

A by-election was held for the New South Wales Legislative Assembly electorate of Balmain South on 6 December 1902 because of the resignation of Sydney Law from Labour and the parliament. Following the 1901 election, the Progressive Party had formed a government with the support of Labour. In 1902 a man named Moss Friedman had been found guilty by a jury, however the judge disagreed with the guilty verdict. The Attorney General, Bernhard Wise, remitted Friedman's sentence and Joseph Carruthers, the Leader of the Opposition, moved a motion in the Legislative Assembly to censure Wise. Law voted in support of the motion despite a Labour decision to oppose it. Law chose to resign and recontest the seat as an Independent Labour candidate.

== Dates ==
Date	Event
30 October 1902	Vote on censure motion in Legislative Assembly/
18 November 1902	Sydney Law resigned.
19 November 1902	Writ of election issued by the Speaker of the Legislative Assembly.
28 November 1902	Nominations
6 December 1902	Polling day
15 December 1902	Return of writ

== Result ==
1902 Balmain South by-election Wednesday 16 August
Party	Candidate	Votes	%	±%
Independent Labour	Sydney Law (re-elected)	1,387	57.9	
Labour	Hugh Byers	1,006	42.1	
Total formal votes		2,388	99.3	+0.3
Informal votes		16	0.7	−0.3
Turnout		2,404	58.9 (Note: based on a roll of 4,082 at the 1901 election.)	−10.1
Member changed to Independent Labour from Labour				

== See also ==
- Electoral results for the district of Balmain South
- List of New South Wales state by-elections
