= 1906 Cootamundra state by-election =

Election result for Cootamundra, New South Wales, Australia

A by-election was held for the New South Wales Legislative Assembly electorate of Cootamundra on 28 July 1906 because of the resignation of William Holman (Labour). John Norton blamed Holman for a series of articles in The Worker commenting on Norton's unnatural silence over the land scandals involving Paddy Crick and William Willis. Norton made a personal attack on Holman in parliament, challenging him to resign and both would contest Holman's seat of Cootamundra.

The Surry Hills by-election was held the previous week. John Norton was a candidate, however he was defeated and withdrew from the contest for Cootamundra. H. V. Evatt argues that the most likely explanation for Norton's attack was to remove Labour's best debater at a critical time.

== Dates ==
Date	Event
5 July 1906	William Holman resigned.
6 July 1906	Writ of election issued by the Speaker of the Legislative Assembly.
17 July 1906	Nominations
28 July 1906	Polling day
14 August 1906	Return of writ

== Result ==
1906 Cootamundra by-election Saturday 28 July
Party	Candidate	Votes	%	±%
Labour	William Holman (re-elected)	2,296	57.8	0.0
Farmers and Settlers	John Fitzpatrick	1,663	41.9	
Independent	John Norton	13	0.3	
Total formal votes		3,972	98.2	−1.0
Informal votes		72	1.8	+1.0
Turnout		4,044	58.5 (Note: Estimate based on an electoral roll of 6,916 at the 1904 election.)	−6.0
Labour hold		Swing		

== See also ==
- Electoral results for the district of Cootamundra
- List of New South Wales state by-elections
