= Henry Peters (Australian politician) =

Australian politician (1881–1918)

Henry John Frederick Peters (1881 – 16 December 1918) was an Australian Labour Party (ALP) politician, later serving and losing his life to the First World War.

Henry was born Heinrich Johannes Friedrich Peters on 28 May 1879 in Hamburg, Germany, contrary to information from the Parliament of New South Wales, whom record his birth as 1 January 1881 in Wagga Wagga. Parents Henning and Johanna Margaretha Peters immigrated to Australia upon the ship Erlangen in 1890, and taking residence in Temora.

Henry attended primary school at Temora but left at a young age to help the family with mining and general bush work, though later became a compositor on local newspapers the Temora Star and Temora Independent. Henry received Australian naturalisation on 30 October 1903, as Henry John Frederick Peters. From 1904 to 1906 he owned and edited the Grenfell Vedette, but the paper failed. After few years of secretary work for Mr J. C. Watson M.P., in 1907 he was elected as a Labor member of the New South Wales Legislative Assembly, representing Deniliquin, transferring to Canterbury in 1913. He was declared bankrupt in 1914, and so forfeited his seat.

In 1916 he tried unsuccessfully to enlist in the Australian Imperial Force, being declared unfit on grounds of insufficient eyesight. He later successfully enlisted in April 1917 under the alias Henry Edward Murray, No. 7522, and served as Private in the 1st Infantry Battalion on the Western Front in France during the years of 1917 and 1918, World War I. Private 'Murray' was wounded in action in April 1918, and returned to the United Kingdom for a period of convalescence. In August 1918 he sustained a right distal leg fracture in a minor wagon accident at the Convalescent Training Depot at Parkhouse, Wiltshire. On 16 December 1918 he died at the Tidworth Military Hospital, the post-mortem determining death from Acute Atrophy Liver, though further antecedent causes were not stated. Henry was interred at the Tidworth Military Cemetery under his true identity, with full military honours including the British War Medal and Victory Medal.

Henry Peters was survived by his wife Winifred (née Wallis), and their children Sylvia, William, and Roy Peters.

New South Wales Legislative Assembly
Preceded by George Reynoldson	Member for Deniliquin; 1907–1913	Succeeded by Abolished
Preceded by Varney Parkes	Member for Canterbury; 1913–1914	Succeeded by George Cann
