= Electoral district of Camperdown =

Former state electoral district of New South Wales, Australia

Camperdown was an electoral district of the Legislative Assembly in the Australian state of New South Wales, created in the 1904 re-distribution of electorates following the 1903 New South Wales referendum, which required the number of members of the Legislative Assembly to be reduced from 125 to 90. It consisted of parts of Annandale and the abolished seats of Darlington, Newtown-Camperdown and Newtown-Erskine. It was named after and included the inner Sydney suburb of Camperdown. In 1920, with the introduction of proportional representation, it was absorbed into the multi-member electorate of Balmain.

== Members for Camperdown ==
Member	Party	Term
James Smith	Progressive	1904–1907
Robert Stuart-Robertson	Labor	1907–1920

== Election results ==
1917 New South Wales state election: Camperdown
Party	Candidate	Votes	%	±%
Labor	Robert Stuart-Robertson	3,930	65.9	−1.4
Nationalist	William Weller	1,980	33.2	+0.5
Ind. Socialist Labor	Arthur Reardon	56	0.9	+0.9
Total formal votes		5,966	98.8	+0.9
Informal votes		74	1.2	+0.9
Turnout		6,040	53.9	−12.7
Labor hold		Swing	−1.4	
