= Electoral district of Balmain South =

Former state electoral district of New South Wales, Australia

Balmain South was an electoral district of the Legislative Assembly in the Australian state of New South Wales from 1894. It was abolished in the 1904 re-distribution of electorates following the 1903 New South Wales referendum, which required the number of members of the Legislative Assembly to be reduced from 125 to 90 and was reabsorbed into the district of Balmain.

== Members for Balmain South ==
Member	Party	Term
Sydney Law	Labour	1894–1902
Sydney Law	Independent Labour	1902–1904
