= George Hindmarsh =

Australian politician

George Thomas Hindmarsh (26 June 1861 – 16 June 1916) was an Australian politician.

He was born in Gerringong to dairy farmer George John Hindmarsh and Jane Potter. He attended Toolejooa Public School and, after unsuccessfully studying surveying, began dairy farming near Clunes. On 14 October 1886 he married Isabel Mary Barrie; they had ten children. In 1890 he moved to Lismore, where he became an auctioneer and stock agent. He was elected to the New South Wales Legislative Assembly at a by-election in 1905 as the Liberal member for Rous, serving until his retirement in 1913. Hindmarsh died in Lismore in 1916.

New South Wales Legislative Assembly
Preceded by John Coleman	Member for Rous; 1905–1913	Abolished
