= Thomas Mackenzie (Australian politician) =

Australian politician

Thomas Fitzherbert Hawkins Mackenzie (1854 – 21 March 1934) was an Australian politician.

He was born in Melbourne to banker William Henry Mackenzie and Helen Hawkins. His family moved to Sydney in 1859 and he was educated privately. Around 1869 he and his brother grew cotton in Fiji; they returned to New South Wales in 1874 and bought land on the Macquarie River, where they were devastated by drought. In 1883 Thomas Mackenzie went to Queensland and later to the Murrumbidgee River before settling in Sydney around 1888 to attend to his father's accounting business. There he became a Strathfield alderman from 1892 to 1911, serving as mayor from 1898 to 1901 and from 1908 to 1910. In 1901 he was elected the Liberal member for Canterbury in the New South Wales Legislative Assembly; he served until his defeat in 1907. Mackenzie died at Neutral Bay in 1934.

New South Wales Legislative Assembly
Preceded by Thomas Taylor	Member for Canterbury; 1901–1907	Succeeded by Varney Parkes
