= Electoral district of Hay =

Former state electoral district of New South Wales, Australia

Hay was an electoral district in the Legislative Assembly of the Australian state of New South Wales created with the abolition of multi-member electorates in 1894, mainly from the abolished electoral district of Balranald, and named after and including the town of Hay. It was abolished in 1904, following the 1903 New South Wales referendum, which required the number of members of the Legislative Assembly to be reduced from 125 to 90. It was absorbed into the districts of The Murrumbidgee and Murray.

== Members for Hay ==
Member	Party	Period
James Ashton	Free Trade	1894–1898
Frank Byrne	Free Trade	1898–1901
Frank Byrne	Independent	1901–1904

== Election results ==
1901 New South Wales state election: Hay
Party	Candidate	Votes	%	±%
Independent	Frank Byrne	unopposed		
Member changed to Independent from Liberal Reform				
