= Electoral district of Burrangong =

Former state electoral district of New South Wales, Australia

Burrangong was an electoral district of the Legislative Assembly in the Australian state of New South Wales created in the 1904 re-distribution of electorates following the 1903 New South Wales referendum, which required the number of members of the Legislative Assembly to be reduced from 125 to 90. It was named after Burrangong station, the first squatting run in the Young area and consisted of parts of the abolished districts of Boorowa, Grenfell and Young. In 1920, with the introduction of proportional representation, it was absorbed along with Yass into Cootamundra.

== Members for Burrangong ==
| Member | Party | Period |
|---|---|---|
| George Burgess | Labor | 1904–1916 |
| George Burgess | Nationalist | 1916–1917 |
| Peter Loughlin | Labor | 1917–1920 |

== Election results ==
1917 New South Wales state election: Burrangong
| Party | Candidate | Votes | % | ±% |
|---|---|---|---|---|
| Labor | Peter Loughlin | 3,925 | 51.1 | +0.8 |
| Nationalist | George Burgess | 3,760 | 48.9 | +48.9 |
| Total formal votes | | 7,685 | 99.0 | +1.4 |
| Informal votes | | 80 | 1.0 | −1.4 |
| Turnout | | 7,765 | 66.3 | −1.2 |
| Labor hold | | Swing | +0.8 | |

The sitting member George Burgess was expelled from Labor in the November 1916 Labor split over conscription.
