= George Reynoldson =

Australian politician

George Reynoldson (27 November 1856 – 20 September 1947) was an Australian politician.

He was born at Fryers Creek in Victoria to miner John Reynoldson and Elizabeth Coates. He received a primary education before starting work at the Meehans Freehold mine at Guildford in 1872. He then worked on the construction of the Moama-Deniliquin and Sale-Melbourne railway lines and on his father's farm near Kyabram, establishing his own selected farm in partnership with his brother near Numurkah in 1878. He farmed wheat and also worked as an auctioneer, and served on Shepparton Shire Council (1883–85) and Numurkah Shire Council (1885–1900, president 1886–87). He later moved his farming operations to the Berrigan district in southern New South Wales, where he was instrumental in the establishment of irrigation schemes. On 19 February 1898 he married Catherine Baikie, with whom he had four children. In 1904 he was elected to the New South Wales Legislative Assembly as the independent member for Deniliquin; he held the seat for a single term before retiring in 1907. Reynoldson died in Melbourne in 1947.

New South Wales Legislative Assembly
Preceded by Joseph Evans	Member for Deniliquin; 1904–1907	Succeeded by Henry Peters
