= Sydney Law =

Australian politician

Sydney James Law
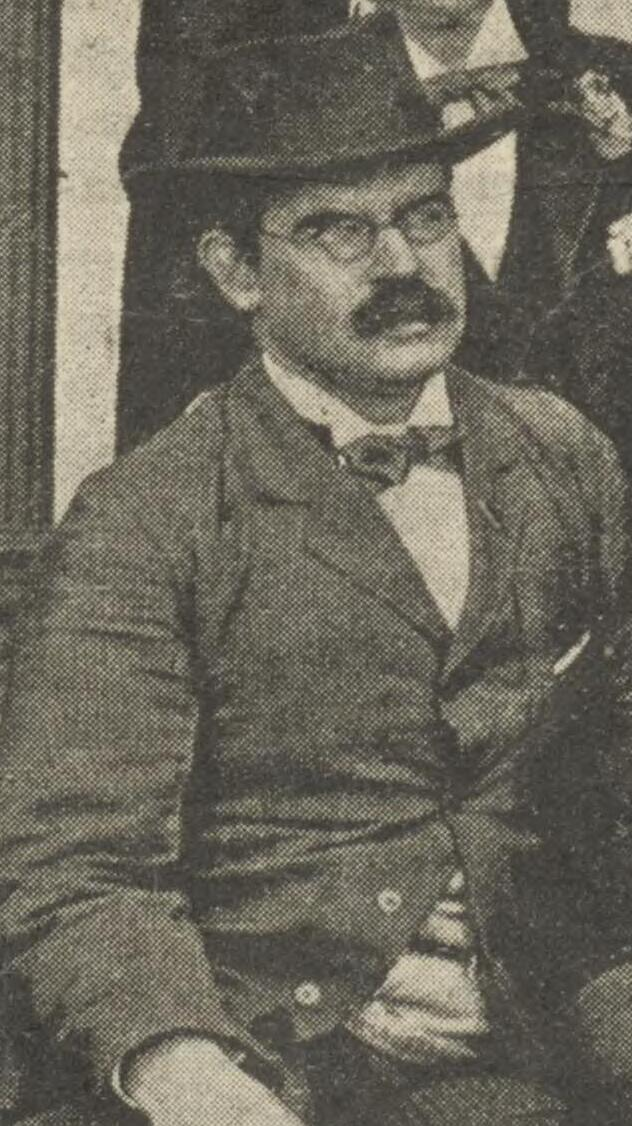
- Sydney Law in 1900
- Born: 23 November 1856; Redfern, New South Wales, Australia
- Died: 7 October 1939 (aged 82); Drummoyne, New South Wales, Australia
- Occupations: Politician, draper, auctioneer and real estate agent

Sydney James Law (23 November 1856 – 7 October 1939) was an Australian politician. Before entering politics he ran a drapery business and afterwards was an auctioneer and real estate agent.

== Early life ==
Born in Redfern to cabinet maker John Law and Sarah Pollard, he established what would become a highly successful drapery shop in Balmain around 1881. On 4 July 1883 he married Mary Maclean, with whom he had two children.

== Political career ==
Having joined the Balmain Labour Electoral League in 1891 and serving as its president, Law was elected to the New South Wales Legislative Assembly as the member for Balmain South in 1894. In 1902, he resigned from the party and the parliament winning the resulting by-election on 6 December as an Independent Labour member. In 1904, he was elected to the seat of Rozelle as a Liberal. Defeated in 1907, he became an auctioneer in 1909 and became active in New South Wales sectarian politics as a Protestant.

== Later life ==
After his time in politics, Law became an auctioneer and real estate agent.

Law moved to Drummoyne in the 1920s. He died in 1939 and was buried at Waverley Cemetery.

New South Wales Legislative Assembly
New district	Member for Balmain South; 1894–1904	District abolished
New district	Member for Rozelle; 1904–1907	Succeeded by James Mercer
