= George Burgess (politician) =

Australian politician (1863–1941)

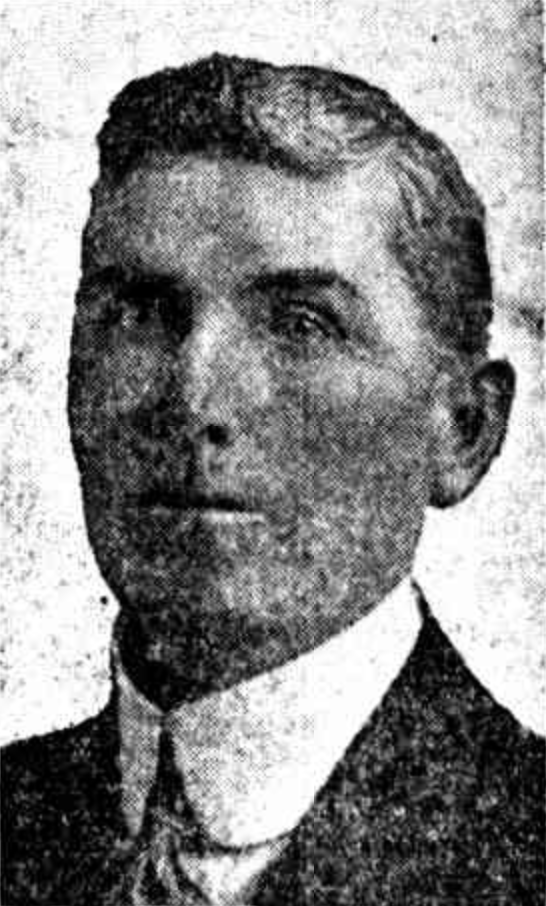
George Burgess MLA in 1916

George Arthur Burgess (2 November 1863 – 8 February 1941) was an Australian politician.

He was born at Mara Creek to publican George Edward Burgess and Mary Grimley. He attended primary school until the age of twelve, after which he worked as a shearer and farmer in the Coonamble district. On 27 January 1896 he married Florence Clark, with whom he would have five children.

An organiser and local secretary of the Australian Workers' Union, he was elected to the New South Wales Legislative Assembly in 1901 as the Labor member for Young. Young was abolished in 1904 and replaced by Burrangong which Burgess successfully contested in 1904. and remained on the Labor backbench until the conscription split of 1916, when, as a supporter of conscription, he followed Premier William Holman into the Nationalist Party. He lost his seat as a Nationalist candidate in 1917.

Burgess died at Liverpool in 1941 (aged 77).

New South Wales Legislative Assembly
| Preceded by Chris Watson | Member for Young; 1901–1904 | District abolished replaced by Burrangong |
| New district replaced Young | Member for Burrangong; 1904–1917 | Succeeded by Peter Loughlin |
