= Electoral district of Deniliquin =

Former state electoral district of New South Wales, Australia

Deniliquin was an electoral district of the Legislative Assembly in the Australian state of New South Wales, named after and including the town of Deniliquin.

== History ==
Prior to 1894 the town of Deniliquin was part of the district of The Murray which returned two members. Multi-member constituencies were abolished in the 1893 redistribution, resulting in the creation of 76 new districts, including Deniliquin. Deniliquin consisted of parts of The Murray, Balranald and The Murrunbidgee.

Deniliquin was expanded to include part of The Murray in 1904 as a result of the 1903 New South Wales referendum which reduced the number of members of the Legislative Assembly from 125 to 90.

The district was abolished in 1913, with the majority of the district, including the town of Deniliquin being absorbed by The Murray and the eastern part being absorbed by Corowa.

== Members for Deniliquin ==
| Member | Party | Term |
|---|---|---|
| John Chanter | Protectionist | 1894–1901 |
| Joseph Evans | Ind. Progressive | 1901–1904 |
| George Reynoldson | Independent | 1904–1907 |
| Henry Peters | Labour | 1907–1913 |

== Election results ==
1910 New South Wales state election: Deniliquin
| Party | Candidate | Votes | % | ±% |
|---|---|---|---|---|
| Labour | Henry Peters | 2,282 | 59.3 | |
| Farmers and Settlers | Arthur Trethowan | 1,566 | 40.7 | |
| Total formal votes | | 3,848 | 98.5 | |
| Informal votes | | 60 | 1.5 | |
| Turnout | | 3,908 | 58.9 | |
| Labour hold | | | | |
