= Electoral district of Rous =

Former state electoral district of New South Wales, Australia

Rous was an electoral district of the Legislative Assembly in the Australian state of New South Wales, created in the 1904 re-distribution of electorates following the 1903 New South Wales referendum, which required the number of members of the Legislative Assembly to be reduced from 125 to 90. It consisted of parts of Lismore and The Tweed. It was named after Rous County, between the Tweed and Richmond Rivers and Henry John Rous, who explored the rivers. In 1913, it was replaced by Byron.

== Members for Rous ==
Member	Party	Period
John Coleman	Liberal Reform	1904–1905
George Hindmarsh	Liberal Reform	1905–1913

== Election results ==
1910 New South Wales state election: Rous
Party	Candidate	Votes	%	±%
Liberal Reform	George Hindmarsh	4,744	56.1	
Labour	Alfred Taylor	3,719	43.9	
Total formal votes		8,463	98.7	
Informal votes		111	1.3	
Turnout		8,574	68.3	
Liberal Reform hold				
