= Joseph Evans (Australian politician) =

Australian politician

Joseph George Evans (1837 – 5 July 1904) was a British-born Australian politician.

He was born in London to salesman James Thomas Evans and Elizabeth Kinsman. The family migrated to New South Wales in 1842, and Evans was apprenticed to a watchmaker and jeweller. In 1860 he established a business in Deniliquin. Declared bankrupt in 1867, he was discharged in 1871. He married Annie Dawson in 1869; they had eight children. Evans was a Deniliquin alderman (1873–87, 1888–1901) and mayor (1875, 1881, 1882, 1886, 1899). In 1901 he was elected to the New South Wales Legislative Assembly as the Independent Progressive member for Deniliquin. He held the seat until his death in 1904.

New South Wales Legislative Assembly
Preceded by John Chanter	Member for Deniliquin; 1901–1904	Succeeded by George Reynoldson
