= Frank Byrne (Australian politician) =

Australian politician

Francis Arthur "Old Frank" Byrne (1837 – 30 June 1923) was Member of the New South Wales Legislative Assembly for the electoral district of Hay 1898–1903.

== Early life ==
He was born in Singleton, New South Wales to Peter Byrne, a miner, and Sarah née Whybrow, and had a very limited education. He married Elizabeth Susan Grace in 1865 and subsequently Sarah Ann Tate ( – 1 May 1908). He had three sons and three daughters.

== Career ==
He was engaged in the coach business with Cobb and Co., for some time at Castlemaine before settling in the Riverina district around 1870, working mostly at Balranald, Wilcannia and Hay. He was interested in current affairs, read newspapers voraciously, and with his genial manner, excellent memory and huge fund of anecdotes was popular with a broad range of the travelling public.

== Politics ==
He was mayor of Hay for two three-year terms, from 1894, and active in the Hospital committee. He became involved in the campaign for Federation.

He stood as a Free Trade candidate at the 1898 election for the Legislative Assembly for Hay and was elected. He was a good local member and achieved several advantages, including the Darlington Point bridge, for his district. He was re-elected unopposed as an independent at the 1901 election, but suffered from ill health and did not contest the 1904 election.

With health improving, he attempted to re-enter parliament for the seat of Murray in 1907, but was unsuccessful, and retired to the Sydney suburb of Newtown.

New South Wales Legislative Assembly
Preceded by James Ashton	Member for Hay; 1898–1904	Abolished
