= Samuel Whiddon =

English-born Australian politician

Samuel Thomas Whiddon (26 June 1848 – 20 September 1905) was an English-born Australian politician.

He was born in London to plasterer Samuel Whiddon and Sarah Fossey. The family migrated to Sydney in 1853 and Whiddon worked as a messenger boy for T. Williams & Co., a boot manufacturing business that he eventually owned. In 1894 he was elected to the New South Wales Legislative Assembly as the Free Trade member for Sydney-Cook. He held the seat until his retirement in 1904. Whiddon died at Glebe in 1905.

New South Wales Legislative Assembly
New seat	Member for Sydney-Cook; 1894–1904	Abolished
