= Electoral district of Sydney-Cook =

Former state electoral district of New South Wales, Australia

Sydney-Cook was an electoral district of the Legislative Assembly in the Australian state of New South Wales, created in 1894 in inner Sydney from part of the electoral district of South Sydney and named after James Cook.

== Members for Cook ==
Member	Party	Term
Samuel Whiddon	Free Trade	1894–1901
Samuel Whiddon	Liberal Reform	1901–1904

== History ==
Multi-member constituencies were abolished in the 1893 redistribution, resulting in the creation of 76 new districts, including Sydney-Cook. Sydney-Cook consisted of a southern part of the four member district of South Sydney. It was in southern Surry Hills bounded by Foveaux Street in the north, Cleveland Street in the south and Elizabeth Street in the west, while the eastern boundary was a dog-leg from Riley Street south to Tudor Street, east via Davies Street and Nobbs Street and then South Dowling Street. In 1904, it was replaced by Surry Hills.

== Election results ==
1901 New South Wales state election: Sydney-Cook
Party	Candidate	Votes	%	±%
Liberal Reform	Samuel Whiddon	665	41.2	−11.0
Progressive	George Perry	623	38.6	−7.5
Independent	John Griffin	170	10.5	
Labour	Philip Mulholland	135	8.4	
Ind. Progressive	William Hart	17	1.1	
Independent	Henry Cato	4	0.3	
Total formal votes		1,614	99.3	−0.1
Informal votes		11	0.7	+0.1
Turnout		1,625	64.4	+7.3
Liberal Reform hold				
