= John Coleman (Australian politician) =

Australian politician

John William Coleman (11 June 1862 – 8 January 1905) was an Australian politician.

He was born near Lismore to sawyer Edmund Coleman and Charlotte Downs. He attended the local public school before becoming a storekeeper. In 1882 he married Elizabeth Rachel Marshall Ventnam; they had four children. He served as a Lismore alderman from 1890 to 1892, from 1893 to 1896 and from 1900 to 1901. In 1901 he was elected to the New South Wales Legislative Assembly as an independent Liberal, representing the seat of Lismore. He was elected for Rous as an endorsed Liberal in 1904, but died in January 1905 at Marrickville.

Colemans Bridge over Leycester Creek at Lismore is named for Coleman.

New South Wales Legislative Assembly
Preceded by Thomas Ewing	Member for Lismore; 1901–1904	Abolished
New seat	Member for Rous; 1904–1905	Succeeded by George Hindmarsh
