= 1903 New South Wales referendum =

16 December 1903
- As to what shall be the number of Members of the Legislative Assembly. Which of the following numbers do you prefer, and what is the order of your preference?

Results
Choice	Votes	%
Reduce to 90	206,273	72.95%
Reduce to 100	13,316	4.71%
Maintain at 125	63,171	22.34%
Valid votes	282,760	87.21%
Invalid or blank votes	41,484	12.79%
Total votes	324,244	100.00%
Registered voters/turnout	345,500	93.85%

A referendum concerning the reduction of the members of the New South Wales Legislative Assembly was put to voters on 16 December 1903, in conjunction with the 1903 federal election. The referendum was conducted on the basis of optional preferential voting. However, preferences were not counted, as an overwhelming majority voted to reduce the number of members to 90.

== The question ==
The text of the question was:

As to what shall be the number of Members of the Legislative Assembly.

Which of the following numbers do you prefer, and what is the order of your preference?

125 (This is the present number.)
100
90

== Results ==
The referendum was overwhelmingly in favour of reducing the number of members to 90.

Result
Question		Votes	%
What should be the number of Members of the Legislative Assembly	Maintain at 125	63,171	22.3
What should be the number of Members of the Legislative Assembly	Reduce to 100	13,316	4.7
What should be the number of Members of the Legislative Assembly	Reduce to 90	206,273	72.9
Total Formal		282,760	87.2
Informal		41,484	12.8
Turnout		324,244	96.32

== Aftermath ==
The referendum did not provide how the reduction of members was to occur. Parliament was recalled to decide how to give effect to the referendum, and passed the Electorates Redistribution Act 1904 which provided the districts were to be determined by three electoral districts commissioners. The proposed districts were published by the commissioners on 18 March 1904, and the final districts were published on 22 April 1904.

== See also ==
- Referendums in Australia
