= Members of the New South Wales Legislative Assembly, 1917–1920 =

Members of the New South Wales Legislative Assembly who served in the 24th parliament of New South Wales held their seats from 1917 to 1920. They were elected at the 1917 state election on 24 March 1917. Speaker was John Cohen until 19 August 1919 when he was succeeded by Daniel Levy.

Name	Party	Electorate	Term in office
Mac Abbott (Note: Upper Hunter Nationalist MLA Mac Abbott resigned in May 1918. The resultant by-election was won by Nationalist candidate William Cameron on 8 June.)	Nationalist	Upper Hunter	1913–1918
Guy Arkins	Nationalist	Castlereagh	1915–1930 1938–1941
Richard Arthur	Nationalist	Middle Harbour	1904–1932
William Ashford	Nationalist	Liverpool Plains	1910–1925
William Bagnall	Nationalist	St George	1913–1925 1925–1927
John Bailey (Note: Monaro Labor MLA Gus Miller died on 20 October 1918. The resultant by-election was won by Labor candidate John Bailey on 23 November.)	Labor	Monaro	1918–1925
Richard Ball	Nationalist	Corowa	1895–1898 1904–1937
Thomas Bavin	Nationalist	Gordon	1917–1935
George Beeby	Nationalist	Wagga Wagga	1907–1913 1917–1920
Walter Bennett	Independent	Durham	1898–1907 1917–1934
John Birt (Note: Paddington Labor MLA John Osborne resigned on being appointed to the Metropolitan Meat Board in April 1919. The resultant by-election was won by Labor candidate Lawrence O'Hara on 24 May but he died before taking his seat. The resultant by-election was won by Labor candidate John Birt on 26 July.)	Labor	Paddington	1919–1925
George Briner	Nationalist	Raleigh	1901–1920
Percy Brookfield	Labor	Sturt	1917–1921
Albert Bruntnell	Nationalist	Parramatta	1906–1907 1910–1913 1916–1929
Arthur Buckley	Labor	Surry Hills	1917–1922
Frank Burke	Labor	Newtown	1917–1944
Michael Burke	Labor	Belmore	1917–1922 1925–1930
Claude Bushell	Labor	Lyndhurst	1917–1920
Ernest Buttenshaw	Nationalist	Lachlan	1917–1938
William Cameron	Nationalist	Upper Hunter	1918–1931
George Cann	Labor	Canterbury	1914–1927
Campbell Carmichael	Labor / Soldiers & Citizens (Note: Leichhardt Labor MLA Campbell Carmichael formed the People's Party of Soldiers and Citizens in 1919.)	Leichhardt	1907–1920
Frank Chaffey	Nationalist	Tamworth	1913–1940
John Cochran	Labor	Darling Harbour	1910–1920
Arthur Cocks	Nationalist	St Leonards	1910–1925
John Cohen (Note: Petersham Nationalist MLA John Cohen resigned to take an appointment as a District Court Judge in February 1919. The resultant by-election was won by Nationalist candidate Sydney Shillington on 22 March.)	Nationalist	Petersham	1898–1919
Percy Colquhoun	Nationalist	Mosman	1913–1920
John Crane	Nationalist	Gwydir	1913–1920
Mat Davidson (Note: Cobar Labor MLA Charles Fern died on 18 April 1918. The resultant by-election was won by Labor candidate Mat Davidson on 1 June.)	Labor	Cobar	1918–1949
Billy Davies	Labor	Wollongong	1917–1949
Brian Doe (Note: Murray Nationalist MLA Robert Scobie died on 15 August 1917. The resultant by-election was won by Nationalist candidate Brian Doe on 22 September.)	Nationalist	Murray	1917–1927
James Dooley	Labor	Hartley	1907–1927
John Doyle	Labor	Phillip	1917–1922
Bill Dunn	Labor	Mudgee	1910–1911, 1911–1932, 1935–1950
Alfred Edden	Nationalist	Kahibah	1891–1920
John Estell	Labor	Wallsend	1901 -1913 1917–1922
James Fallick	Nationalist	Singleton	1901–1920
Charles Fern	Labor	Cobar	1913–1918
John Fitzpatrick	Nationalist	Orange	1895–1904 1907–1930
Sir George Fuller	Nationalist	Wollondilly	1889–1894 1915–1928
Arthur Gardiner	Independent Labor	Newcastle	1910–1922
Alexander Graff	Nationalist	Drummoyne	1916–1920
William Grahame	Nationalist	Wickham	1907–1920
Arthur Grimm	Nationalist	Ashburnham	1913–1925
David Hall	Nationalist	Enmore	1901–1904 1913–1920
Thomas Henley	Nationalist	Burwood	1904–1935
Simon Hickey	Labor	Alexandria	1912–1922
William Holman	Nationalist	Cootamundra	1898–1920
Tom Hoskins	Nationalist	Dulwich Hill	1913–1927
John Hunt	Nationalist	Camden	1907–1920
Augustus James	Nationalist	Goulburn	1907–1920
Valentine Johnston	Labor	Bathurst	1917–1922
William Kearsley	Labor	Cessnock	1910–1921
Tom Keegan	Labor	Glebe	1910–1920 1921–1935
Herbert Lane	Nationalist	Armidale	1915–1920
Jack Lang	Labor	Granville	1913–1943, 1943–1946
William Latimer	Nationalist	Woollahra	1901 -1920
Carlo Lazzarini	Labor	Marrickville	1917–1952
Charles Lee	Nationalist	Tenterfield	1884–1920
Daniel Levy	Nationalist	Darlinghurst	1901–1937
Thomas Ley	Nationalist	Hurstville	1917–1925
Peter Loughlin	Labor	Burrangong	1917–1927, 1932–1935
Arthur Manning	Nationalist	Albury	1917–1920
James Macarthur-Onslow	Nationalist	Bondi	1907–1922
George McDonald	Nationalist	Bingara	1910–1920
Patrick McGarry	Nationalist	Murrumbidgee	1904–1920
Greg McGirr	Labor	Yass	1913–1925
Patrick McGirr (Note: Macquarie Labor MLA Thomas Thrower died on 21 June 1917. The resultant by-election was won by Labor candidate Patrick McGirr on 12 July.)	Labor	Macquarie	1917–1920
William McKell	Labor	Redfern	1917–1947
William Millard	Nationalist	Bega	1894–1920 1920–1921
Gus Miller	Labor	Monaro	1889–1918
Henry Morton	Nationalist	Hastings and Macleay	1910–1920
Mark Morton	Nationalist	Allowrie	1901–1920 1922–1938
Thomas Mutch	Labor	Botany	1917 -1930 1938–1941
George Nesbitt	Nationalist	Lismore	1913–1925
Charles Nicholson	Nationalist	Maitland	1911–1920
Charles Oakes	Nationalist	Waverley	1901–1910 1917–1925
William O'Brien	Labor	Annandale	1917–1925
Lawrence O'Hara	Labor	Paddington	1919
John Osborne	Labor	Paddington	1910–1919
John Perry	Nationalist	Byron	1889–1920
Richard Price (Note: Gloucester Independent MLA Richard Price was expelled from Parliament for abusing parliamentary privilege by making baseless allegations against William Ashford, the Secretary for Lands. He was re-elected at the resultant by-election on 10 November.)	Independent	Gloucester	1894–1904 1907–1922
William Robson	Nationalist	Ashfield	1905–1920
Robert Scobie	Nationalist	Murray	1901–1917
Sydney Shillington	Nationalist	Petersham	1919–1922
Tom Smith	Labor	King	1917–1920
David Storey	Nationalist	Randwick	1894–1920
John Storey	Labor	Balmain	1901–1904 1907–1921
Robert Stuart-Robertson	Labor	Camperdown	1907–1933
Follett Thomas	Nationalist	Gough	1903–1920
William Thompson	Nationalist	Ryde	1913–1920
Thomas Thrower	Labor	Macquarie	1904–1917
Bruce Walker	Independent	Hawkesbury	1917–1932
Walter Wearne	Ind. Nationalist	Namoi	1917–1930
Reginald Weaver	Nationalist	Willoughby	1917–1925, 1927–1945
Jabez Wright	Labor	Willyama	1913–1920 1921–1922
William Zuill	Nationalist	Clarence	1915–1920

== See also ==
- Second Holman ministry
- Results of the 1917 New South Wales state election
- Candidates of the 1917 New South Wales state election
