= Electoral results for the district of King (New South Wales) =

Election results for King, New South Wales, Australia

King, an electoral district of the Legislative Assembly in the Australian state of New South Wales, had two incarnations, the first from 1904 to 1920 and the second from 1927 to 1973.

Election	Member	Party
1904	Ernest Broughton	Liberal Reform
1907	Ernest Broughton	Liberal Reform
1910	James Morrish	Labor
1913	James Morrish	Labor / Nationalist
1917	Tom Smith	Labor
Election	Member	Party
1927	Daniel Clyne	Labor
1930	Daniel Clyne	Labor
1932	Daniel Clyne	Labor (NSW)
1935	Daniel Clyne	Labor (NSW)
1938	Daniel Clyne	Labor
1941	Daniel Clyne	Labor
1944	Daniel Clyne	Labor
1947	Daniel Clyne	Labor
1950	Daniel Clyne	Labor
1953	Daniel Clyne	Labor
1956	Albert Sloss	Labor
1959	Albert Sloss	Labor
1962	Albert Sloss	Labor
1965	Albert Sloss	Labor
1968	Albert Sloss	Labor
1971	Albert Sloss	Labor

== Election results ==
=== Elections in the 1970s ===
==== 1971 ====
1971 New South Wales state election: King
Party	Candidate	Votes	%	±%
Labor	Albert Sloss	16,918	71.2	+4.0
Liberal	Andrew Bush	4,628	19.5	−0.4
Communist	Doris Jobling	1,146	4.8	−4.3
Independent	Ernest Williams	1,060	4.5	+4.5
Total formal votes		23,752	94.1	
Informal votes		1,478	5.9	
Turnout		25,230	88.7	
Two-party-preferred result
Labor	Albert Sloss	18,408	77.5	+1.1
Liberal	Andrew Bush	5,344	22.5	−1.1
Labor hold		Swing	+1.1	

=== Elections in the 1960s ===
==== 1968 ====
1968 New South Wales state election: King
Party	Candidate	Votes	%	±%
Labor	Albert Sloss	16,197	67.2	+0.6
Liberal	Alfred Van Der Poorten	4,804	19.9	−5.6
Communist	Brian Crispin	2,195	9.1	+1.1
Independent	Martyn Harper	920	3.8	+3.8
Total formal votes		24,116	95.6	
Informal votes		1,106	4.4	
Turnout		25,222	91.9	
Two-party-preferred result
Labor	Albert Sloss	18,413	76.4	+3.3
Liberal	Alfred Van Der Poorten	5,703	23.6	−3.3
Labor hold		Swing	+3.3	

==== 1965 ====
1965 New South Wales state election: King
Party	Candidate	Votes	%	±%
Labor	Albert Sloss	11,277	58.6	−5.1
Liberal	John Partridge	6,445	33.5	+8.2
Communist	Ron Maxwell	1,532	8.0	+3.9
Total formal votes		19,254	96.3	−0.6
Informal votes		742	3.7	+0.6
Turnout		19,996	89.8	−0.1
Two-party-preferred result
Labor	Albert Sloss	12,503	64.9	−3.4
Liberal	John Partridge	6,751	35.1	+3.4
Labor hold		Swing	−3.4	

==== 1962 ====
1962 New South Wales state election: King
Party	Candidate	Votes	%	±%
Labor	Albert Sloss	13,470	63.7	+3.6
Liberal	Norah O'Kelly	5,345	25.3	−7.3
Democratic Labor	William Doherty	1,481	7.0	+7.0
Communist	Alfred Watt	868	4.1	−3.3
Total formal votes		21,164	96.9	
Informal votes		682	3.1	
Turnout		21,846	89.9	0.0
Two-party-preferred result
Labor	Albert Sloss	14,460	68.3	+2.4
Liberal	Norah O'Kelly	6,704	31.7	−2.4
Labor hold		Swing	+2.4	

=== Elections in the 1950s ===
==== 1959 ====
1959 New South Wales state election: King
Party	Candidate	Votes	%	±%
Labor	Albert Sloss	13,105	65.1	
Liberal	Adrian Cook	5,539	27.5	
Communist	Ron Maxwell	1,482	7.4	
Total formal votes		20,126	97.0	
Informal votes		629	3.0	
Turnout		20,755	90.0	
Two-party-preferred result
Labor	Albert Sloss	14,291	71.0	
Liberal	Adrian Cook	5,835	29.0	
Labor hold		Swing		

==== 1956 ====
1956 New South Wales state election: King
Party	Candidate	Votes	%	±%
Labor	Albert Sloss	10,700	56.6	−21.2
Liberal	Roberta Galagher	4,456	23.6	+1.4
Lang Labor	Michael Callinan	2,568	13.6	+13.6
Communist	Ron Maxwell	1,179	6.2	+6.2
Total formal votes		18,903	96.5	+0.3
Informal votes		690	3.5	−0.3
Turnout		19,593	90.0	+0.9
Two-party-preferred result
Labor	Albert Sloss	13,610	72.0	−5.8
Liberal	Roberta Galagher	5,293	28.0	+5.8
Labor hold		Swing	−5.8	

==== 1953 ====
1953 New South Wales state election: King
Party	Candidate	Votes	%	±%
Labor	Daniel Clyne	16,181	77.8	
Liberal	Roberta Galagher	4,628	22.2	
Total formal votes		20,809	96.2	
Informal votes		830	3.8	
Turnout		21,639	89.1	
Labor hold		Swing		

==== 1950 ====
1950 New South Wales state election: King
Party	Candidate	Votes	%	±%
Labor	Daniel Clyne	10,125	50.9	
Lang Labor	Horace Foley	5,313	26.7	
Liberal	Roberta Galagher	4,053	20.4	
Independent	Clare Peters	387	2.0	
Total formal votes		19,878	96.9	
Informal votes		639	3.1	
Turnout		20,517	89.4	
Two-party-preferred result
Labor	Daniel Clyne		75.0 (Note: Two party preferred vote was estimated.)	
Liberal	Roberta Galagher		25.0	
Labor hold		Swing		

=== Elections in the 1940s ===
==== 1947 ====
1947 New South Wales state election: King
Party	Candidate	Votes	%	±%
Labor	Daniel Clyne	9,104	44.8	−9.3
Liberal	Roberta Galagher	4,859	23.9	+23.9
Lang Labor	Horace Foley	4,759	23.4	−22.5
Communist	Frederick Haimes	1,602	7.9	+7.9
Total formal votes		20,324	95.8	+2.2
Informal votes		886	4.2	−2.2
Turnout		21,210	91.0	+6.1
After distribution of preferences
Labor	Daniel Clyne	10,305	50.7	
Liberal	Roberta Gallagher	5,071	24.9	
Lang Labor	Horace Foley	4,948	24.4	
Labor hold		Swing	N/A	

- Preferences were not distributed to completion.

==== 1944 ====
1944 New South Wales state election: King
Party	Candidate	Votes	%	±%
Labor	Daniel Clyne	9,647	54.1	−8.9
Lang Labor	Horace Foley	8,175	45.9	+45.9
Total formal votes		17,822	93.6	−0.3
Informal votes		1,218	6.4	+0.3
Turnout		19,040	84.9	−0.3
Labor hold		Swing	N/A	

==== 1941 ====
1941 New South Wales state election: King
Party	Candidate	Votes	%	±%
Labor	Daniel Clyne	11,025	63.0	
State Labor	Albert Sloss	6,488	37.0	
Total formal votes		17,513	93.9	
Informal votes		1,137	6.1	
Turnout		18,650	84.6	
Labor hold		Swing		

=== Elections in the 1930s ===
==== 1938 ====
1938 New South Wales state election: King
Party	Candidate	Votes	%	±%
Labor	Daniel Clyne	7,841	51.1	−0.5
United Australia	Rowland Bowen	5,581	36.4	−7.2
Independent	Josiah Trenerry	1,488	9.7	+9.7
Independent	Patrick McDonnell	431	2.8	+2.8
Total formal votes		15,341	96.1	−0.7
Informal votes		626	3.9	+0.7
Turnout		15,967	90.9	−0.8
Labor hold		Swing	N/A	

- Preferences were not distributed.

==== 1935 ====
1935 New South Wales state election: King
Party	Candidate	Votes	%	±%
Labor (NSW)	Daniel Clyne	7,867	51.6	+0.6
United Australia	Geoffrey Robin	6,651	43.6	−0.1
Communist	James Prentice	723	4.7	+2.6
Total formal votes		15,241	96.8	−0.9
Informal votes		495	3.2	+0.9
Turnout		15,736	91.7	−0.9
Labor (NSW) hold		Swing	N/A	

- Preferences were not distributed.

==== 1932 ====
1932 New South Wales state election: King
Party	Candidate	Votes	%	±%
Labor (NSW)	Daniel Clyne	8,578	51.0	−16.2
United Australia	Henry Manning	7,356	43.7	+12.7
Federal Labor	Edgar Grover	547	3.3	+3.3
Communist	Ted Tripp	354	2.1	+0.3
Total formal votes		16,835	97.7	+0.9
Informal votes		404	2.3	−0.9
Turnout		17,239	92.6	+5.4
Labor (NSW) hold		Swing	N/A	

- Preferences were not distributed.

==== 1930 ====
1930 New South Wales state election: King
Party	Candidate	Votes	%	±%
Labor	Daniel Clyne	10,469	67.2	
Nationalist	Ernest Hagon	4,829	31.0	
Communist	Robert Shayler	277	1.8	
Total formal votes		15,575	96.8	
Informal votes		522	3.2	
Turnout		16,097	87.2	
Labor hold		Swing		

=== Elections in the 1920s ===
==== 1927 ====
1927 New South Wales state election: King
Party	Candidate	Votes	%	±%
Labor	Daniel Clyne	6,637	62.9	
Nationalist	George Overhill	3,914	37.1	
Total formal votes		10,551	98.8	
Informal votes		125	1.2	
Turnout		10,676	65.3	
Labor win		(new seat)		

District recreated

==== 1920 - 1927 ====
District abolished

=== Elections in the 1910s ===
==== 1917 ====
1917 New South Wales state election: King
Party	Candidate	Votes	%	±%
Labor	Tom Smith	2,907	53.0	−3.4
Nationalist	James Morrish	2,485	45.3	+2.9
Independent	Lindsay Thompson	48	0.9	+0.9
Independent	James Jones	28	0.5	+0.5
Ind. Socialist Labor	Ernie Judd	22	0.4	+0.4
Total formal votes		5,490	98.6	0.0
Informal votes		80	1.4	0.0
Turnout		5,570	48.5	−10.5
Labor hold		Swing	−3.4	

The sitting member James Morrish was expelled from Labor in the November 1916 Labor split over conscription.

==== 1913 ====
1913 New South Wales state election: King
Party	Candidate	Votes	%	±%
Labor	James Morrish	3,688	56.4	
Liberal Reform	Henry Manning	2,775	42.4	
Australasian Socialist	John Roche	75	1.2	
Total formal votes		6,538	98.6	
Informal votes		91	1.4	
Turnout		6,629	59.0	
Labor hold				

==== 1910 ====
1910 New South Wales state election: King
Party	Candidate	Votes	%	±%
Labour	James Morrish	3,133	54.6	+6.0
Liberal Reform	Neville Mayman	2,566	44.7	−6.7
Independent	Robert Roberts	17	0.3	
Independent	James Jones	10	0.2	
Independent	Philip Cullen	5	0.1	
Independent	Michael Egan	5	0.1	
Total formal votes		5,736	97.5	−0.1
Informal votes		145	2.5	+0.1
Turnout		5,881	62.5	0.0
Labour gain from Liberal Reform				

=== Elections in the 1900s ===
==== 1907 ====
1907 New South Wales state election: King
Party	Candidate	Votes	%	±%
Liberal Reform	Ernest Broughton	2,461	51.4	
Labour	John West	2,331	48.6	
Total formal votes		4,792	97.6	
Informal votes		120	2.4	
Turnout		4,912	62.5	
Liberal Reform hold				

==== 1904 ====
1904 New South Wales state election: King
Party	Candidate	Votes	%	±%
Liberal Reform	Ernest Broughton	2,154	48.6	
Progressive	Patrick Quinn	1,704	38.5	
Independent	Lindsay Thompson	385	8.7	
Independent Labour	Daniel Green	105	2.4	
Independent	John Lawler	57	1.3	
Independent Liberal	Henry Parr	15	0.3	
Independent	James Jones	9	0.2	
Total formal votes		4,429	97.3	
Informal votes		122	2.7	
Turnout		4,551	47.9	
Liberal Reform win		(new seat)		

King was a new seat which largely replaced the abolished seat of Sydney-King less a part lost to Darling Harbour. It was expanded to include parts of Sydney-Bligh and Sydney-Fitzroy. The member for Sydney-King was Ernest Broughton (Progressive), however he stood as a Liberal Reform candidate. The member for Sydney-Bligh was Patrick Quinn (Progressive). The member for Sydney-Fitzroy was Daniel Levy (Liberal Reform) who successfully contested Darlinghurst.
