= Candidates of the 1917 New South Wales state election =

This is a list of candidates for the 1917 New South Wales state election. The election was held on 24 March 1917.

During the previous parliament, the Labor Party had split over the conscription issue, with Premier William Holman leading many members into the new Nationalist Party, a merger of the pro-conscriptionist Labor members and the Liberal Party. Seats held by the ex-Labor Nationalists are shown as being Labor-held.

== Retiring Members ==
=== Labor ===
- Ernest Durack MLA (Bathurst)

=== Nationalist ===
- Henry Hoyle MLA (Surry Hills) — elected as Labor
- James Mercer (Rozelle) — elected as Labor
- Charles Wade MLA (Gordon)

== Legislative Assembly ==
Sitting members are shown in bold text. Successful candidates are highlighted in the relevant colour. Where there is possible confusion, an asterisk (*) is also used.

Electorate	Held by	Labor candidate	Nationalist candidate	Other candidates
Albury	Labor	George Bodkin	Arthur Manning	**John Cusack** (Ind Lab)
Alexandria	Labor	**Simon Hickey**	Sydney Smith	James Dixon (Ind)
Allowrie	Nationalist	William Gibbs	**Mark Morton**	
Annandale	Labor	William O'Brien		**Arthur Griffith** (Ind Lab)
Armidale	Nationalist	John Andrews	**Herbert Lane**	
Ashburnham	Nationalist	John Lynch	**Arthur Grimm**	
Ashfield	Nationalist	George Boland	**William Robson**	
Balmain	Labor	**John Storey**	Robert Stopford	John Bell (Ind); Michael Moore (Ind)
Bathurst	Labor	Valentine Johnston	John Miller	John Sullivan (Ind)
Bega	Nationalist	John Webster	**William Millard**	
Belmore	Labor	Michael Burke		Thomas Barlow (Ind Lab)
Bingara	Ind Labor	Alfred McClelland	**George McDonald**	
Bondi	Nationalist		**James Macarthur-Onslow**	
Botany	Ind Labor	Thomas Mutch		**Fred Page** (Ind Lab)
Burrangong	Labor	Peter Loughlin	**George Burgess**	
Burwood	Nationalist	Arthur Apsey	**Thomas Henley**	
Byron	Nationalist		**John Perry**	William McKeever (Ind); Patrick McMahon (Ind); Percy Tighe (Ind Lab)
Camden	Nationalist	Frederick Parker	**John Hunt**	Arthur Bosley (Ind); Frederick Webster (Ind)
Camperdown	Labor	**Robert Stuart-Robertson**	William Weller	Arthur Reardon (ISLP)
Canterbury	Labor	**George Cann**		James Lee (Ind)
Castlereagh	Labor	Joseph Clark	**Guy Arkins**	
Cessnock	Labor	**William Kearsley**		
Clarence	Nationalist		**William Zuill**	
Cobar	Labor	**Charles Fern**		
Cootamundra	Labor	**Patrick Minahan**	**William Holman**	
Corowa	Nationalist	Samuel Ringwood	**Richard Ball**	
Darling Harbour	Labor	**John Cochran**	William Phillips	William McMahon (Ind)
Darlinghurst	Nationalist	John Farrell	**Daniel Levy**	Percy Brunton (Ind)
Drummoyne	Nationalist	Bertie Sheiles	**Alexander Graff**	Walter Kirkaldy (Ind)
Dulwich Hill	Nationalist	Joseph Cahill	**Tom Hoskins**	
Durham	Nationalist	Walter O'Hearn	**William Brown**	Walter Bennett* (Ind); Daniel Ferry (Ind)
Enmore	Labor	Thomas Burke	**David Hall**	Dominic Healy (ISLP); Andrew Macauley (Ind)
Glebe	Labor	**Tom Keegan**	Walter Clutton	David Middleton (Ind)
Gloucester	Nationalist	Albert Jones	Lewis Martin	**Richard Price** (Ind)
Gordon	Nationalist		Thomas Bavin	Robert Forsyth (Ind Nat); Edward Loxton (Ind Nat); Fitt Petrie (Ind Nat)
Gough	Nationalist	Lou Cunningham	**Follett Thomas**	
Goulburn	Nationalist	Con Hogan	**Augustus James**	
Granville	Labor	**Jack Lang**	Walter Duncan	Abraham Taylor (Ind)
Gwydir	Nationalist	William Scully	**John Crane**	
Hartley	Labor	**James Dooley**	James Ryan	
Hastings and Macleay	Independent	Hercules Rowe	**Henry Morton**	
Hawkesbury	Nationalist	Tom Arthur	Brinsley Hall	Bruce Walker (Ind)
Hurstville	Labor	**Sam Toombs**	Thomas Ley	
Kahibah	Labor	Hugh Connell	**Alfred Edden**	William Ellis (Ind)
King	Labor	Tom Smith	**James Morrish**	James Jones (Ind); Ernie Judd (ISLP); Lindsay Thompson (Ind)
Lachlan	Labor	**Thomas Brown**	Ernest Buttenshaw	
Leichhardt	Labor	**Campbell Carmichael**		
Lismore	Nationalist		**George Nesbitt**	Michael O'Halloran (Ind Lab)
Liverpool Plains	Labor	Abraham Berry	**William Ashford**	
Lyndhurst	Nationalist	Claude Bushell	**Thomas Waddell**	
Macquarie	Labor	**Thomas Thrower**	Murdock McLeod	
Maitland	Nationalist	William Brennan	**Charles Nicholson**	
Marrickville	Labor	Carlo Lazzarini	**Tom Crawford**	Tedbar Barden (Ind); Frederick Hodges (Ind)
Middle Harbour	Nationalist		**Richard Arthur**	Arthur Keirle (Ind); Alfred Reid (Ind)
Monaro	Labor	**Gus Miller**	John Perkins	
Mosman	Nationalist		**Percy Colquhoun**	
Mudgee	Labor	**Bill Dunn**		
Murray	Labor	Richard O'Halloran	**Robert Scobie**	Patrick Duffy (Ind)
Murrumbidgee	Labor	Arthur Cook	**Patrick McGarry**	
Namoi	Labor	Thomas Egan		**George Black** (Ind Lab); Walter Wearne* (Ind Nat)
Newcastle	Labor	Francis McCormack		**Arthur Gardiner** (Ind Lab)
Newtown	Labor	Frank Burke	**Robert Hollis**	John Kilburn (ISLP); Tom Walsh (Ind)
Orange	Nationalist	James Tully	**John Fitzpatrick**	
Paddington	Labor	**John Osborne**	Thomas Eslick	
Parramatta	Nationalist	Jock Garden	**Albert Bruntnell**	John Strachan (Ind)
Petersham	Nationalist	James Bourke	**John Cohen**	John Lucas (Ind)
Phillip	Labor	John Doyle		**Richard Meagher** (Ind Lab); James Slade (ISLP)
Raleigh	Nationalist	Francis Collins	**George Briner**	
Randwick	Nationalist	Bob O'Halloran	**David Storey**	
Redfern	Labor	William McKell	**James McGowen**	Henry Ostler (ISLP)
Rozelle	Labor	John Quirk	Alfred Reed	
Ryde	Nationalist	William Hutchison	**William Thompson**	Norman McIntosh (Ind)
St George	Labor	Arthur Dengate	**William Bagnall**	
St Leonards	Nationalist	Robert Edwards	**Arthur Cocks**	Frederick Clancy (Ind)
Singleton	Nationalist	Richard Bramston	**James Fallick**	Leslie Hewitt (Ind); Valdemar Olling (Ind)
Sturt	Labor	**Percy Brookfield**		Francis Harvey (Ind Nat)
Surry Hills	Labor	Arthur Buckley	Percy Daly	John Eaton (Ind); Ludwig Klausen (ISLP); Thomas Kohan (Ind)
Tamworth	Nationalist		**Frank Chaffey**	Robert Levien (Ind)
Tenterfield	Nationalist	William Sturgess	**Charles Lee**	
Upper Hunter	Nationalist	Robert Kennedy	**Mac Abbott**	
Wagga Wagga	Labor	**Walter Boston**	George Beeby	
Wallsend	Labor	**John Estell**		
Waverley	Labor	**James Fingleton**	Charles Oakes	
Wickham	Labor	Christopher Pattinson	**William Grahame**	
Willoughby	Independent	John Chambers	Reginald Weaver	Frederick Cowdroy (Ind); **John Haynes** (Ind); William Shepherd (Ind)
Willyama	Labor	**Jabez Wright**		Brian Doe (Ind Nat)
Wollondilly	Nationalist	Daniel Chalker	**George Fuller**	
Wollongong	Labor	Billy Davies	**John Nicholson**	Joseph Charlton (ISLP)
Woollahra	Nationalist	Chester Davies	**William Latimer**	
Yass	Labor	**Greg McGirr**	Patrick Bourke	

== See also ==
- Members of the New South Wales Legislative Assembly, 1917–1920
