= Results of the 1917 New South Wales state election =

State election for New South Wales, Australia in March 1917

1917 New South Wales state election Legislative Assembly << 1913–1920 >>
| Enrolled voters | 1,109,830 | | | | |
| Votes cast | 616,146 | | Turnout | 61.43 | -6.81 |
| Informal votes | 6,332 | | Informal | 1.02 | –1.28 |
Summary of votes by party
| Party | Primary votes | % | Swing | Seats | Change |
| Nationalist (Note: Compared to the combined vote of Liberal Reform, Farmers and Settlers and Country Party Association at the 1913 election.) | 292,306 | 47.44 | +1.17 | 52 | +13 |
| Labor | 262,655 | 42.63 | −4.00 | 33 | −16 |
| Independent | 25,528 | 4.14 | +1.86 | 3 | +2 |
| Independent Labor | 20,085 | 3.26 | +1.88 | 1 | 0 |
| Ind. Nationalist | 15,201 | 2.47 | +0.03 | 1 | +1 |
| Ind. Socialist Labor | 371 | 0.06 | –0.19 | 0 | 0 |
| Total | 616,146 | | | 90 | |

The 1917 New South Wales state election involved 90 electoral district returning one member each. If a candidate failed to achieve at least 50% of the vote in an electorate, a run-off election would take place in the following weeks. In this election, 8 electorates proceeded to second round elections.

== Election results ==
=== Albury ===
1917 New South Wales state election: Albury
| Party | Candidate | Votes | % | ±% |
|---|---|---|---|---|
| Nationalist | Arthur Manning | 3,395 | 50.0 | +50.0 |
| Labor | George Bodkin | 2,385 | 35.1 | −9.3 |
| Independent Labor | John Cusack | 1,011 | 14.9 | +14.9 |
| Total formal votes | | 6,791 | 98.6 | +1.4 |
| Informal votes | | 94 | 1.4 | −1.4 |
| Turnout | | 6,885 | 61.2 | −8.7 |
Second round result
| Nationalist | Arthur Manning | 3,916 | 55.2 | +55.2 |
| Labor | George Bodkin | 3,177 | 44.8 | −7.8 |
| Total formal votes | | 7,093 | 99.8 | +1.2 |
| Informal votes | | 13 | 0.2 | −1.2 |
| Turnout | | 7,106 | 63.1 | +1.9 |
| Nationalist gain from Labor | | Swing | | |

The sitting member John Cusack was expelled from Labor in the November 1916 Labor split over conscription.

=== Alexandria ===
1917 New South Wales state election: Alexandria
| Party | Candidate | Votes | % | ±% |
|---|---|---|---|---|
| Labor | Simon Hickey | 3,670 | 69.9 | −0.1 |
| Nationalist | Sydney Smith | 1,388 | 26.4 | +26.4 |
| Independent | James Dixon | 189 | 3.6 | −16.6 |
| Total formal votes | | 5,247 | 99.1 | +1.9 |
| Informal votes | | 50 | 0.9 | −1.9 |
| Turnout | | 5,297 | 53.9 | −0.4 |
| Labor hold | | Swing | −0.1 | |

=== Allowrie ===
1917 New South Wales state election: Allowrie
| Party | Candidate | Votes | % | ±% |
|---|---|---|---|---|
| Nationalist | Mark Morton | 4,562 | 61.9 | 0.0 |
| Labor | William Gibbs | 2,802 | 38.1 | 0.0 |
| Total formal votes | | 7,364 | 99.2 | +1.2 |
| Informal votes | | 57 | 0.8 | −1.2 |
| Turnout | | 7,421 | 68.6 | −7.1 |
| Nationalist hold | | Swing | 0.0 | |

=== Annandale ===
1917 New South Wales state election: Annandale
| Party | Candidate | Votes | % | ±% |
|---|---|---|---|---|
| Labor | William O'Brien | 3,762 | 51.0 | −3.0 |
| Independent Labor | Arthur Griffith | 3,608 | 49.0 | +49.0 |
| Total formal votes | | 7,370 | 99.0 | +0.8 |
| Informal votes | | 77 | 1.0 | −0.8 |
| Turnout | | 7,447 | 64.7 | −9.2 |
| Labor hold | | Swing | −3.0 | |

Sitting member Arthur Griffith was expelled from Labor in the November 1916 Labor split over conscription.

=== Armidale ===
1917 New South Wales state election: Armidale
| Party | Candidate | Votes | % | ±% |
|---|---|---|---|---|
| Nationalist | Herbert Lane | 3,459 | 56.5 | +0.6 |
| Labor | John Andrews | 2,661 | 43.5 | −0.6 |
| Total formal votes | | 6,120 | 99.2 | +1.8 |
| Informal votes | | 46 | 0.8 | −1.8 |
| Turnout | | 6,166 | 62.0 | −11.5 |
| Nationalist hold | | Swing | +0.6 | |

=== Ashburnham ===
1917 New South Wales state election: Ashburnham
| Party | Candidate | Votes | % | ±% |
|---|---|---|---|---|
| Nationalist | Arthur Grimm | 4,169 | 54.9 | +4.6 |
| Labor | John Lynch | 3,423 | 45.1 | −4.6 |
| Total formal votes | | 7,592 | 99.0 | +1.5 |
| Informal votes | | 78 | 1.0 | −1.5 |
| Turnout | | 7,670 | 72.6 | −4.9 |
| Nationalist hold | | Swing | +4.6 | |

=== Ashfield ===
1917 New South Wales state election: Ashfield
| Party | Candidate | Votes | % | ±% |
|---|---|---|---|---|
| Nationalist | William Robson | 6,697 | 76.4 | +5.9 |
| Labor | George Boland | 2,063 | 23.6 | −3.1 |
| Total formal votes | | 8,760 | 99.0 | +1.7 |
| Informal votes | | 87 | 1.0 | −1.7 |
| Turnout | | 8,847 | 58.3 | −6.4 |
| Nationalist hold | | Swing | +5.9 | |

=== Balmain ===
1917 New South Wales state election: Balmain
| Party | Candidate | Votes | % | ±% |
|---|---|---|---|---|
| Labor | John Storey | 3,838 | 54.3 | −3.7 |
| Nationalist | Robert Stopford | 3,055 | 43.2 | +13.3 |
| Independent | Michael Moore | 161 | 2.3 | +2.3 |
| Independent | John Bell | 20 | 0.3 | +0.3 |
| Total formal votes | | 7,074 | 99.1 | +0.3 |
| Informal votes | | 62 | 0.9 | −0.3 |
| Turnout | | 7,136 | 62.7 | −3.5 |
| Labor hold | | Swing | −3.7 | |

=== Bathurst ===
1917 New South Wales state election: Bathurst
| Party | Candidate | Votes | % | ±% |
|---|---|---|---|---|
| Labor | Valentine Johnston | 3,805 | 51.9 | +1.7 |
| Nationalist | John Miller | 3,114 | 42.4 | −7.4 |
| Independent | John Sullivan | 417 | 5.7 | +5.7 |
| Total formal votes | | 7,336 | 99.0 | +2.0 |
| Informal votes | | 75 | 1.0 | −2.0 |
| Turnout | | 7,411 | 72.3 | −3.5 |
| Labor hold | | Swing | +1.7 | |

The sitting member was Ernest Durack (Labor) who did not contest the election.

=== Bega ===
1917 New South Wales state election: Bega
| Party | Candidate | Votes | % | ±% |
|---|---|---|---|---|
| Nationalist | William Millard | 3,452 | 58.4 | +17.8 |
| Labor | John Webster | 2,459 | 41.6 | +9.0 |
| Total formal votes | | 5,911 | 99.1 | +0.6 |
| Informal votes | | 52 | 0.9 | −0.6 |
| Turnout | | 5,963 | 63.0 | −13.2 |
| Nationalist hold | | Swing | +6.2 | |

=== Belmore ===
1917 New South Wales state election: Belmore
| Party | Candidate | Votes | % | ±% |
|---|---|---|---|---|
| Labor | Michael Burke | 3,224 | 66.9 | +16.0 |
| Independent Labor | Thomas Barlow | 1,596 | 33.1 | +33.1 |
| Total formal votes | | 4,820 | 98.5 | +1.9 |
| Informal votes | | 71 | 1.5 | −1.9 |
| Turnout | | 4,891 | 48.1 | −11.7 |
| Labor hold | | Swing | +16.0 | |

The sitting Labor member for Belmore, Patrick Minahan, lost preselection and unsuccessfully contested Cootamundra against Labor turned Nationalist Premier William Holman.

=== Bingara ===
1917 New South Wales state election: Bingara
| Party | Candidate | Votes | % | ±% |
|---|---|---|---|---|
| Nationalist | George McDonald | 3,113 | 51.5 | +3.7 |
| Labor | Alfred McClelland | 2,935 | 48.5 | +0.7 |
| Total formal votes | | 6,048 | 98.4 | +1.0 |
| Informal votes | | 95 | 1.6 | −1.0 |
| Turnout | | 6,143 | 65.5 | −5.0 |
| Member changed to Nationalist from Labor / Independent | | | | |

George McDonald had been elected as a Labor member in the 1913 election. He resigned from the party and his seat as a protest at the behaviour of the Easter 1916 NSW Labor conference and retained the seat at the by-election as an Independent.

=== Bondi ===
1917 New South Wales state election: Bondi
| Party | Candidate | Votes | % | ±% |
|---|---|---|---|---|
| Nationalist | James Macarthur-Onslow | unopposed | | |
| Nationalist hold | | | | |

=== Botany ===
1917 New South Wales state election: Botany
| Party | Candidate | Votes | % | ±% |
|---|---|---|---|---|
| Labor | Thomas Mutch | 5,333 | 57.9 | +18.1 |
| Independent Labor | Fred Page | 3,882 | 42.1 | −18.1 |
| Total formal votes | | 9,215 | 99.1 | +1.3 |
| Informal votes | | 80 | 0.9 | −1.3 |
| Turnout | | 9,295 | 63.2 | −1.0 |
| Labor gain from Independent Labor | | Swing | +18.1 | |

=== Burrangong ===
1917 New South Wales state election: Burrangong
| Party | Candidate | Votes | % | ±% |
|---|---|---|---|---|
| Labor | Peter Loughlin | 3,925 | 51.1 | +0.8 |
| Nationalist | George Burgess | 3,760 | 48.9 | +48.9 |
| Total formal votes | | 7,685 | 99.0 | +1.4 |
| Informal votes | | 80 | 1.0 | −1.4 |
| Turnout | | 7,765 | 66.3 | −1.2 |
| Labor hold | | Swing | +0.8 | |

The sitting member George Burgess was expelled from Labor in the November 1916 Labor split over conscription.

=== Burwood ===
1917 New South Wales state election: Burwood
| Party | Candidate | Votes | % | ±% |
|---|---|---|---|---|
| Nationalist | Thomas Henley | 7,125 | 77.0 | +9.5 |
| Labor | Arthur Apsey | 2,122 | 23.0 | −9.5 |
| Total formal votes | | 9,247 | 99.1 | +1.8 |
| Informal votes | | 83 | 0.9 | −1.8 |
| Turnout | | 9,330 | 60.1 | −8.3 |
| Nationalist hold | | Swing | +9.5 | |

=== Byron ===
1917 New South Wales state election: Byron
| Party | Candidate | Votes | % | ±% |
|---|---|---|---|---|
| Nationalist | John Perry | 2,572 | 38.6 | −12.4 |
| Independent | Oliver Virtue | 2,516 | 37.7 | +37.7 |
| Independent | Patrick McMahon | 1,055 | 15.8 | +15.8 |
| Independent Labor | Percy Tighe | 496 | 7.4 | +7.4 |
| Independent | William McKeever | 29 | 0.4 | +0.4 |
| Total formal votes | | 6,668 | 97.9 | +0.4 |
| Informal votes | | 142 | 2.1 | −0.4 |
| Turnout | | 6,810 | 57.8 | −7.0 |
Second round result
| Nationalist | John Perry | 3,445 | 52.2 | |
| Independent | Oliver Virtue | 3,153 | 47.8 | |
| Total formal votes | | 6,598 | 99.3 | +1.4 |
| Informal votes | | 43 | 0.7 | −1.4 |
| Turnout | | 6,641 | 56.3 | −1.5 |
| Nationalist hold | | | | |

=== Camden ===
1917 New South Wales state election: Camden
| Party | Candidate | Votes | % | ±% |
|---|---|---|---|---|
| Nationalist | John Hunt | 4,412 | 55.3 | −7.8 |
| Labor | Frederick Parker | 2,768 | 34.7 | +3.9 |
| Independent | Arthur Bosley | 688 | 8.6 | +8.6 |
| Independent | Frederick Webster | 115 | 1.4 | +1.4 |
| Total formal votes | | 7,983 | 99.0 | +1.2 |
| Informal votes | | 82 | 1.0 | −1.2 |
| Turnout | | 8,065 | 60.0 | −5.6 |
| Nationalist hold | | Swing | −7.8 | |

=== Camperdown ===
1917 New South Wales state election: Camperdown
| Party | Candidate | Votes | % | ±% |
|---|---|---|---|---|
| Labor | Robert Stuart-Robertson | 3,930 | 65.9 | −1.4 |
| Nationalist | William Weller | 1,980 | 33.2 | +0.5 |
| Ind. Socialist Labor | Arthur Reardon | 56 | 0.9 | +0.9 |
| Total formal votes | | 5,966 | 98.8 | +0.9 |
| Informal votes | | 74 | 1.2 | +0.9 |
| Turnout | | 6,040 | 53.9 | −12.7 |
| Labor hold | | Swing | −1.4 | |

=== Canterbury ===
1917 New South Wales state election: Canterbury
| Party | Candidate | Votes | % | ±% |
|---|---|---|---|---|
| Labor | George Cann | 8,272 | 89.0 | +37.0 |
| Independent | James Lee | 1,020 | 11.0 | +11.0 |
| Total formal votes | | 9,292 | 98.9 | +1.3 |
| Informal votes | | 105 | 1.1 | −1.3 |
| Turnout | | 9,397 | 41.6 | −30.2 |
| Labor hold | | Swing | +37.0 | |

=== Castlereagh ===
1917 New South Wales state election: Castlereagh
| Party | Candidate | Votes | % | ±% |
|---|---|---|---|---|
| Nationalist | Guy Arkins | 3,336 | 53.5 | +53.5 |
| Labor | Joseph Clark | 2,902 | 46.5 | −5.9 |
| Total formal votes | | 6,238 | 98.8 | +1.8 |
| Informal votes | | 78 | 1.2 | −1.8 |
| Turnout | | 6,316 | 61.8 | −9.2 |
| Member changed to Nationalist from Labor | | | | |

The sitting member Guy Arkins was expelled from Labor in the November 1916 Labor split over conscription.

=== Cessnock ===
1917 New South Wales state election: Cessnock
| Party | Candidate | Votes | % | ±% |
|---|---|---|---|---|
| Labor | William Kearsley | unopposed | | |
| Labor hold | | | | |

=== Clarence ===
1917 New South Wales state election: Clarence
| Party | Candidate | Votes | % | ±% |
|---|---|---|---|---|
| Nationalist | William Zuill | unopposed | | |
| Nationalist hold | | | | |

=== Cobar ===
1917 New South Wales state election: Cobar
| Party | Candidate | Votes | % | ±% |
|---|---|---|---|---|
| Labor | Charles Fern | unopposed | | |
| Labor hold | | | | |

=== Cootamundra ===
1917 New South Wales state election: Cootamundra
| Party | Candidate | Votes | % | ±% |
|---|---|---|---|---|
| Nationalist | William Holman | 4,411 | 55.1 | +55.1 |
| Labor | Patrick Minahan | 3,590 | 44.9 | −9.8 |
| Total formal votes | | 8,001 | 99.4 | +0.2 |
| Informal votes | | 51 | 0.6 | −0.2 |
| Turnout | | 8,052 | 70.3 | −6.6 |
| Member changed to Nationalist from Labor | | | | |

The sitting member William Holman was expelled from Labor in the November 1916 Labor split over conscription. Patrick Minahan was the sitting member for Belmore however he lost preselection for that seat.

=== Corowa ===
1917 New South Wales state election: Corowa
| Party | Candidate | Votes | % | ±% |
|---|---|---|---|---|
| Nationalist | Richard Ball | 3,996 | 67.7 | +2.2 |
| Labor | Samuel Ringwood | 1,909 | 32.3 | −2.2 |
| Total formal votes | | 5,905 | 99.4 | +1.2 |
| Informal votes | | 34 | 0.6 | −1.2 |
| Turnout | | 5,939 | 53.9 | −11.5 |
| Nationalist hold | | Swing | +2.2 | |

=== Darling Harbour ===
1917 New South Wales state election: Darling Harbour
| Party | Candidate | Votes | % | ±% |
|---|---|---|---|---|
| Labor | John Cochran | 3,264 | 73.2 | +8.3 |
| Nationalist | William Phillips | 1,130 | 25.3 | +25.3 |
| Independent | William McMahon | 65 | 1.5 | +1.5 |
| Total formal votes | | 4,459 | 98.3 | +2.7 |
| Informal votes | | 77 | 1.7 | −2.7 |
| Turnout | | 4,536 | 46.8 | −7.6 |
| Labor hold | | Swing | +8.3 | |

=== Darlinghurst ===
1917 New South Wales state election: Darlinghurst
| Party | Candidate | Votes | % | ±% |
|---|---|---|---|---|
| Nationalist | Daniel Levy | 4,143 | 55.0 | +2.2 |
| Labor | John Farrell | 3,316 | 44.1 | −3.1 |
| Independent | Percy Brunton | 68 | 0.9 | +0.9 |
| Total formal votes | | 7,527 | 98.4 | +1.7 |
| Informal votes | | 124 | 1.6 | −1.7 |
| Turnout | | 7,651 | 55.3 | −6.0 |
| Nationalist hold | | Swing | +2.2 | |

=== Drummoyne ===
1917 New South Wales state election: Drummoyne
| Party | Candidate | Votes | % | ±% |
|---|---|---|---|---|
| Nationalist | Alexander Graff | 6,404 | 66.2 | +10.0 |
| Labor | Bertie Sheiles | 3,238 | 33.5 | −4.9 |
| Independent | Walter Kirkaldy | 35 | 0.4 | +0.4 |
| Total formal votes | | 9,677 | 98.8 | +1.0 |
| Informal votes | | 120 | 1.2 | −1.0 |
| Turnout | | 9,797 | 62.3 | −8.3 |
| Nationalist hold | | Swing | +2.2 | |

=== Dulwich Hill ===
1917 New South Wales state election: Dulwich Hill
| Party | Candidate | Votes | % | ±% |
|---|---|---|---|---|
| Nationalist | Tom Hoskins | 6,098 | 68.8 | +9.3 |
| Labor | Joseph Cahill | 2,765 | 31.2 | −7.4 |
| Total formal votes | | 8,863 | 99.5 | +1.5 |
| Informal votes | | 43 | 0.5 | −1.5 |
| Turnout | | 8,906 | 61.6 | −10.0 |
| Nationalist hold | | Swing | +9.3 | |

=== Durham ===
1917 New South Wales state election: Durham
| Party | Candidate | Votes | % | ±% |
|---|---|---|---|---|
| Nationalist | William Brown | 2,767 | 45.0 | −5.4 |
| Independent | Walter Bennett | 1,872 | 30.5 | −11.8 |
| Labor | Walter O'Hearn | 1,029 | 16.8 | +9.5 |
| Independent | Daniel Ferry | 475 | 7.7 | +7.7 |
| Total formal votes | | 6,143 | 98.7 | +0.9 |
| Informal votes | | 78 | 1.3 | −0.9 |
| Turnout | | 6,221 | 65.9 | −8.0 |
Second round result
| Independent | Walter Bennett | 3,021 | 50.1 | |
| Nationalist | William Brown | 3,005 | 49.9 | |
| Total formal votes | | 6,026 | 99.4 | +0.7 |
| Informal votes | | 39 | 0.6 | −0.7 |
| Turnout | | 6,065 | 64.3 | −1.6 |
| Independent gain from Nationalist | | | | |

=== Enmore ===
1917 New South Wales state election: Enmore
| Party | Candidate | Votes | % | ±% |
|---|---|---|---|---|
| Nationalist | David Hall | 4,091 | 51.4 | +1.6 |
| Labor | Thomas Burke | 3,787 | 47.6 | −1.2 |
| Independent | Andrew Macauley | 45 | 0.6 | +0.6 |
| Ind. Socialist Labor | Dominic Healy | 30 | 0.4 | +0.4 |
| Total formal votes | | 7,953 | 99.0 | +0.3 |
| Informal votes | | 80 | 1.0 | −0.3 |
| Turnout | | 8,033 | 63.2 | −7.2 |
| Member changed to Nationalist from Labor | | | | |

The sitting member David Hall was expelled from Labor in the November 1916 Labor split over conscription.

=== Glebe ===
1917 New South Wales state election: Glebe
| Party | Candidate | Votes | % | ±% |
|---|---|---|---|---|
| Labor | Tom Keegan | 4,106 | 57.6 | +0.4 |
| Nationalist | Walter Clutton | 2,947 | 41.3 | −1.5 |
| Independent | David Middleton | 78 | 1.1 | +1.1 |
| Total formal votes | | 7,131 | 98.8 | +1.0 |
| Informal votes | | 83 | 1.2 | −1.0 |
| Turnout | | 7,214 | 60.0 | −13.4 |
| Labor hold | | Swing | +0.4 | |

=== Gloucester ===
1917 New South Wales state election: Gloucester
| Party | Candidate | Votes | % | ±% |
|---|---|---|---|---|
| Nationalist | Lewis Martin | 2,671 | 40.8 | +40.8 |
| Independent | Richard Price | 2,390 | 36.5 | −17.2 |
| Labor | Albert Jones | 1,487 | 22.7 | +2.1 |
| Total formal votes | | 6,548 | 99.2 | +1.2 |
| Informal votes | | 54 | 0.8 | −1.2 |
| Turnout | | 6,602 | 65.9 | −5.2 |
Second round result
| Independent | Richard Price | 3,815 | 56.0 | |
| Nationalist | Lewis Martin | 2,999 | 44.0 | |
| Total formal votes | | 6,814 | 99.7 | +0.5 |
| Informal votes | | 22 | 0.3 | −0.5 |
| Turnout | | 6,836 | 68.3 | +2.4 |
| Member changed to Independent from Farmers and Settlers / Nationalist | | | | |

Richard Price had been elected as a Farmers and Settlers member in the 1913 election. He joined the Nationalist Party however he was not endorsed by the party for the 1917 election and ran as an independent.

=== Gordon ===
1917 New South Wales state election: Gordon
| Party | Candidate | Votes | % | ±% |
|---|---|---|---|---|
| Ind. Nationalist | Edward Loxton | 3,822 | 35.2 | +35.2 |
| Nationalist | Thomas Bavin | 2,928 | 26.9 | −42.0 |
| Ind. Nationalist | Robert Forsyth | 2,753 | 25.3 | +25.3 |
| Ind. Nationalist | Fitt Petrie | 1,366 | 12.6 | +12.6 |
| Total formal votes | | 10,869 | 99.2 | +1.1 |
| Informal votes | | 89 | 0.8 | −1.1 |
| Turnout | | 10,958 | 62.7 | −7.7 |
Second round result
| Nationalist | Thomas Bavin | 5,612 | 50.2 | −18.7 |
| Ind. Nationalist | Edward Loxton | 5,573 | 49.8 | +49.8 |
| Total formal votes | | 11,185 | 99.7 | +0.5 |
| Informal votes | | 28 | 0.3 | −0.5 |
| Turnout | | 11,213 | 64.2 | +1.5 |
| Nationalist hold | | | | |

The sitting member was Charles Wade (Nationalist) who did not contest the election.

=== Gough ===
1917 New South Wales state election: Gough
| Party | Candidate | Votes | % | ±% |
|---|---|---|---|---|
| Nationalist | Follet Thomas | 3,633 | 52.1 | 0.0 |
| Labor | Lou Cunningham | 3,337 | 47.9 | 0.0 |
| Total formal votes | | 6,970 | 98.5 | +1.0 |
| Informal votes | | 105 | 1.5 | −1.0 |
| Turnout | | 7,075 | 65.6 | −12.9 |
| Nationalist hold | | Swing | 0.0 | |

=== Goulburn ===
1917 New South Wales state election: Goulburn
| Party | Candidate | Votes | % | ±% |
|---|---|---|---|---|
| Nationalist | Augustus James | 4,290 | 51.4 | −2.4 |
| Labor | Con Hogan | 4,055 | 48.6 | +2.4 |
| Total formal votes | | 8,345 | 99.3 | +1.8 |
| Informal votes | | 56 | 0.7 | −1.8 |
| Turnout | | 8,401 | 65.1 | −7.6 |
| Nationalist hold | | Swing | −2.4 | |

=== Granville ===
1917 New South Wales state election: Granville
| Party | Candidate | Votes | % | ±% |
|---|---|---|---|---|
| Labor | Jack Lang | 6,707 | 50.8 | −1.1 |
| Nationalist | Walter Duncan | 6,066 | 45.9 | −2.2 |
| Independent | Abraham Taylor | 432 | 3.3 | +3.3 |
| Total formal votes | | 13,205 | 98.8 | +1.5 |
| Informal votes | | 155 | 1.2 | −1.5 |
| Turnout | | 13,360 | 67.7 | −7.1 |
| Labor hold | | Swing | −1.1 | |

=== Gwydir ===
1917 New South Wales state election: Gwydir
| Party | Candidate | Votes | % | ±% |
|---|---|---|---|---|
| Nationalist | John Crane | 3,542 | 59.2 | +4.4 |
| Labor | William Scully | 2,440 | 40.8 | −4.4 |
| Total formal votes | | 5,982 | 99.4 | +2.0 |
| Informal votes | | 38 | 0.6 | −2.0 |
| Turnout | | 6,020 | 61.0 | −2.2 |
| Nationalist hold | | Swing | +4.4 | |

=== Hartley ===
1917 New South Wales state election: Hartley
| Party | Candidate | Votes | % | ±% |
|---|---|---|---|---|
| Labor | James Dooley | 4,970 | 52.0 | −3.3 |
| Nationalist | James Ryan | 4,582 | 48.0 | +3.3 |
| Total formal votes | | 9,552 | 98.7 | +1.5 |
| Informal votes | | 126 | 1.3 | −1.5 |
| Turnout | | 9,678 | 67.5 | −3.9 |
| Labor hold | | Swing | −3.3 | |

=== Hastings and Macleay ===
1917 New South Wales state election: Hastings and Macleay
| Party | Candidate | Votes | % | ±% |
|---|---|---|---|---|
| Nationalist | Henry Morton | 4,528 | 64.4 | +64.4 |
| Labor | Hercules Rowe | 2,506 | 35.6 | +35.6 |
| Total formal votes | | 7,034 | 99.1 | +0.7 |
| Informal votes | | 63 | 0.9 | −0.7 |
| Turnout | | 7,097 | 61.4 | −17.0 |
| Member changed to Nationalist from Independent | | | | |

=== Hawkesbury ===
1917 New South Wales state election: Hawkesbury
| Party | Candidate | Votes | % | ±% |
|---|---|---|---|---|
| Nationalist | Brinsley Hall | 3,395 | 46.0 | −16.2 |
| Independent | Bruce Walker | 2,011 | 27.2 | +27.2 |
| Labor | Tom Arthur | 1,981 | 26.8 | +1.2 |
| Total formal votes | | 7,387 | 98.9 | +1.8 |
| Informal votes | | 79 | 1.1 | −1.8 |
| Turnout | | 7,466 | 67.0 | +3.9 |
Second round result
| Independent | Bruce Walker | 3,600 | 50.2 | |
| Nationalist | Brinsley Hall | 3,568 | 49.8 | |
| Total formal votes | | 7,168 | 99.6 | +0.7 |
| Informal votes | | 26 | 0.4 | −0.7 |
| Turnout | | 7,194 | 64.5 | +1.4 |
| Independent gain from Nationalist | | | | |

=== Hurstville ===
1917 New South Wales state election: Hurstville
| Party | Candidate | Votes | % | ±% |
|---|---|---|---|---|
| Nationalist | Thomas Ley | 7,904 | 59.4 | +10.0 |
| Labor | Sam Toombs | 5,395 | 40.6 | −5.8 |
| Total formal votes | | 13,299 | 99.2 | +1.5 |
| Informal votes | | 111 | 0.8 | −1.5 |
| Turnout | | 13,410 | 68.2 | −4.1 |
| Nationalist gain from Labor | | Swing | +11.0 | |

=== Kahibah ===
1917 New South Wales state election: Kahibah
| Party | Candidate | Votes | % | ±% |
|---|---|---|---|---|
| Nationalist | Alfred Edden | 3,728 | 48.5 | +15.1 |
| Labor | Hugh Connell | 3,724 | 48.5 | −16.9 |
| Independent | William Ellis | 234 | 3.0 | +3.0 |
| Total formal votes | | 7,686 | 99.1 | +1.7 |
| Informal votes | | 67 | 0.9 | −1.7 |
| Turnout | | 7,753 | 63.2 | −1.1 |
Second round result
| Nationalist | Alfred Edden | 4,396 | 51.0 | |
| Labor | Hugh Connell | 4,216 | 49.0 | |
| Total formal votes | | 8,612 | 99.6 | +0.5 |
| Informal votes | | 36 | 0.4 | −0.5 |
| Turnout | | 8,648 | 70.5 | +7.3 |
| Member changed to Nationalist from Labor | | | | |

The sitting member Alfred Edden was expelled from Labor in the November 1916 Labor split over conscription.

=== King ===
1917 New South Wales state election: King
| Party | Candidate | Votes | % | ±% |
|---|---|---|---|---|
| Labor | Tom Smith | 2,907 | 53.0 | −3.4 |
| Nationalist | James Morrish | 2,485 | 45.3 | +2.9 |
| Independent | Lindsay Thompson | 48 | 0.9 | +0.9 |
| Independent | James Jones | 28 | 0.5 | +0.5 |
| Ind. Socialist Labor | Ernie Judd | 22 | 0.4 | +0.4 |
| Total formal votes | | 5,490 | 98.6 | 0.0 |
| Informal votes | | 80 | 1.4 | 0.0 |
| Turnout | | 5,570 | 48.5 | −10.5 |
| Labor hold | | Swing | −3.4 | |

The sitting member James Morrish was expelled from Labor in the November 1916 Labor split over conscription.

=== Lachlan ===
1917 New South Wales state election: Lachlan
| Party | Candidate | Votes | % | ±% |
|---|---|---|---|---|
| Nationalist | Ernest Buttenshaw | 3,639 | 52.0 | +52.0 |
| Labor | Thomas Brown | 3,362 | 48.0 | −2.8 |
| Total formal votes | | 7,001 | 98.5 | +1.9 |
| Informal votes | | 103 | 1.5 | −1.9 |
| Turnout | | 7,104 | 61.4 | −7.1 |
| Nationalist gain from Labor | | | | |

=== Leichhardt ===
1917 New South Wales state election: Leichhardt
| Party | Candidate | Votes | % | ±% |
|---|---|---|---|---|
| Labor | Campbell Carmichael | unopposed | | |
| Labor hold | | | | |

=== Lismore ===
1917 New South Wales state election: Lismore
| Party | Candidate | Votes | % | ±% |
|---|---|---|---|---|
| Nationalist | George Nesbitt | 4,720 | 79.1 | +8.3 |
| Independent Labor | Michael O'Halloran | 1,250 | 20.9 | +20.9 |
| Total formal votes | | 5,970 | 99.1 | +1.2 |
| Informal votes | | 52 | 0.9 | −1.2 |
| Turnout | | 6,022 | 53.3 | −16.7 |
| Nationalist hold | | Swing | +8.3 | |

=== Liverpool Plains ===
1917 New South Wales state election: Liverpool Plains
| Party | Candidate | Votes | % | ±% |
|---|---|---|---|---|
| Nationalist | William Ashford | 3,593 | 52.9 | +21.3 |
| Labor | Abraham Berry | 3,194 | 47.1 | −4.9 |
| Total formal votes | | 6,787 | 99.0 | +2.8 |
| Informal votes | | 69 | 1.0 | −2.8 |
| Turnout | | 6,856 | 62.9 | −6.7 |
| Member changed to Nationalist from Labor | | | | |

The sitting member William Ashford was expelled from Labor in the November 1916 Labor split over conscription.

=== Lyndhurst ===
1917 New South Wales state election: Lyndhurst
| Party | Candidate | Votes | % | ±% |
|---|---|---|---|---|
| Labor | Claude Bushell | 4,071 | 50.7 | +1.8 |
| Nationalist | Thomas Waddell | 3,967 | 49.3 | −1.8 |
| Total formal votes | | 8,038 | 98.9 | +1.1 |
| Informal votes | | 88 | 1.1 | −1.1 |
| Turnout | | 8,126 | 70.6 | −1.0 |
| Labor gain from Nationalist | | Swing | +1.8 | |

=== Macquarie ===
1917 New South Wales state election: Macquarie
| Party | Candidate | Votes | % | ±% |
|---|---|---|---|---|
| Labor | Thomas Thrower | 3,899 | 50.9 | +0.5 |
| Nationalist | Murdock McLeod | 3,769 | 49.1 | −0.5 |
| Total formal votes | | 7,668 | 99.0 | +1.6 |
| Informal votes | | 80 | 1.0 | −1.6 |
| Turnout | | 7,748 | 72.4 | −7.3 |
| Labor hold | | Swing | +0.5 | |

=== Maitland ===
1917 New South Wales state election: Maitland
| Party | Candidate | Votes | % | ±% |
|---|---|---|---|---|
| Nationalist | Charles Nicholson | 4,012 | 61.7 | +11.1 |
| Labor | William Brennan | 2,492 | 38.3 | −11.1 |
| Total formal votes | | 6,504 | 99.2 | +1.6 |
| Informal votes | | 52 | 0.8 | −1.6 |
| Turnout | | 6,556 | 64.8 | −13.2 |
| Nationalist hold | | Swing | +11.1 | |

=== Marrickville ===
1917 New South Wales state election: Marrickville
| Party | Candidate | Votes | % | ±% |
|---|---|---|---|---|
| Labor | Carlo Lazzarini | 4,085 | 51.3 | −10.1 |
| Nationalist | Thomas Crawford | 3,565 | 44.8 | +8.8 |
| Independent | Frederick Hodges | 295 | 3.7 | +3.7 |
| Independent | Tedbar Barden | 15 | 0.2 | +0.2 |
| Total formal votes | | 7,960 | 99.1 | +1.1 |
| Informal votes | | 72 | 0.9 | −1.1 |
| Turnout | | 8,032 | 61.0 | −4.7 |
| Labor hold | | Swing | −10.1 | |

The sitting member Thomas Crawford was expelled from Labor in the November 1916 Labor split over conscription.

=== Middle Harbour ===
1917 New South Wales state election: Middle Harbour
| Party | Candidate | Votes | % | ±% |
|---|---|---|---|---|
| Nationalist | Richard Arthur | 5,106 | 59.5 | −5.1 |
| Independent | Alfred Reid | 1,904 | 22.2 | +22.2 |
| Independent | Arthur Keirle | 1,568 | 18.3 | +18.3 |
| Total formal votes | | 8,578 | 98.8 | +1.0 |
| Informal votes | | 107 | 1.2 | −1.0 |
| Turnout | | 8,685 | 53.9 | −13.2 |
| Nationalist hold | | Swing | −5.1 | |

=== Monaro ===
1917 New South Wales state election: Monaro
| Party | Candidate | Votes | % | ±% |
|---|---|---|---|---|
| Labor | Gus Miller | 3,947 | 62.6 | +6.0 |
| Nationalist | John Perkins | 2,356 | 37.4 | −5.1 |
| Total formal votes | | 6,303 | 99.2 | +2.0 |
| Informal votes | | 52 | 0.8 | −2.0 |
| Turnout | | 6,355 | 65.7 | −6.8 |
| Labor hold | | Swing | +6.0 | |

=== Mosman ===
1917 New South Wales state election: Mosman
| Party | Candidate | Votes | % | ±% |
|---|---|---|---|---|
| Nationalist | Percy Colquhoun | unopposed | | |
| Nationalist hold | | | | |

=== Mudgee ===
1917 New South Wales state election: Mudgee
| Party | Candidate | Votes | % | ±% |
|---|---|---|---|---|
| Labor | Bill Dunn | unopposed | | |
| Labor hold | | | | |

=== Murray ===
1917 New South Wales state election: Murray
| Party | Candidate | Votes | % | ±% |
|---|---|---|---|---|
| Nationalist | Robert Scobie | 2,926 | 58.6 | +13.8 |
| Labor | Richard O'Halloran | 2,010 | 40.3 | −14.9 |
| Independent | Patrick Duffy | 55 | 1.1 | +1.1 |
| Total formal votes | | 4,991 | 98.9 | +1.0 |
| Informal votes | | 56 | 1.1 | −1.0 |
| Turnout | | 5,047 | 52.2 | −1.0 |
| Member changed to Nationalist from Labor | | | | |

The sitting member Robert Scobie was expelled from Labor in the November 1916 Labor split over conscription.

=== Murrumbidgee ===
1917 New South Wales state election: Murrumbidgee
| Party | Candidate | Votes | % | ±% |
|---|---|---|---|---|
| Nationalist | Patrick McGarry | 4,432 | 57.2 | +9.0 |
| Labor | Arthur Cook | 3,310 | 42.8 | −9.0 |
| Total formal votes | | 7,742 | 99.0 | +1.4 |
| Informal votes | | 79 | 1.0 | −1.4 |
| Turnout | | 7,821 | 58.7 | −9.4 |
| Member changed to Nationalist from Labor | | | | |

The sitting member Patrick McGarry was expelled from Labor in the November 1916 Labor split over conscription.

=== Namoi ===
1917 New South Wales state election: Namoi
| Party | Candidate | Votes | % | ±% |
|---|---|---|---|---|
| Ind. Nationalist | Walter Wearne | 2,389 | 42.3 | +42.3 |
| Labor | Thomas Egan | 2,373 | 42.0 | −11.3 |
| Independent Labor | George Black | 883 | 15.6 | +15.6 |
| Total formal votes | | 5,645 | 98.0 | +0.9 |
| Informal votes | | 117 | 2.0 | −0.9 |
| Turnout | | 5,762 | 61.0 | −2.7 |
Second round result
| Ind. Nationalist | Walter Wearne | 3,112 | 55.3 | |
| Labor | Thomas Egan | 2,516 | 44.7 | |
| Total formal votes | | 5,628 | 99.6 | +1.6 |
| Informal votes | | 25 | 0.4 | −1.6 |
| Turnout | | 5,653 | 59.9 | −1.1 |
| Ind. Nationalist gain from Labor | | | | |

The sitting member George Black was expelled from Labor in the November 1916 Labor split over conscription.

=== Newcastle ===
1917 New South Wales state election: Newcastle
| Party | Candidate | Votes | % | ±% |
|---|---|---|---|---|
| Independent Labor | Arthur Gardiner | 5,303 | 69.2 | +69.2 |
| Labor | Francis McCormack | 2,358 | 30.8 | −39.7 |
| Total formal votes | | 7,661 | 99.3 | +1.1 |
| Informal votes | | 56 | 0.7 | −1.1 |
| Turnout | | 7,717 | 60.0 | −9.6 |
| Member changed to Independent Labor from Labor | | | | |

The sitting member Arthur Gardiner was expelled from Labor in the November 1916 Labor split over conscription.

=== Newtown ===
1917 New South Wales state election: Newtown
| Party | Candidate | Votes | % | ±% |
|---|---|---|---|---|
| Labor | Frank Burke | 3,690 | 55.1 | −10.5 |
| Nationalist | Robert Hollis | 2,654 | 39.6 | +7.3 |
| Independent | Tom Walsh | 299 | 4.5 | +4.5 |
| Ind. Socialist Labor | John Kilburn | 51 | 0.8 | −1.3 |
| Total formal votes | | 6,694 | 98.8 | +0.8 |
| Informal votes | | 82 | 1.2 | −0.8 |
| Turnout | | 6,776 | 58.2 | −4.0 |
| Labor hold | | | | |

The sitting member Robert Hollis was expelled from Labor in the November 1916 Labor split over conscription.

=== Orange ===
1917 New South Wales state election: Orange
| Party | Candidate | Votes | % | ±% |
|---|---|---|---|---|
| Nationalist | John Fitzpatrick | 4,363 | 52.5 | −0.8 |
| Labor | James Tully | 3,953 | 47.5 | +0.8 |
| Total formal votes | | 8,316 | 99.2 | +1.3 |
| Informal votes | | 64 | 0.8 | −1.3 |
| Turnout | | 8,380 | 71.6 | −4.4 |
| Nationalist hold | | Swing | −0.8 | |

=== Paddington ===
1917 New South Wales state election: Paddington
| Party | Candidate | Votes | % | ±% |
|---|---|---|---|---|
| Labor | John Osborne | 4,512 | 57.1 | +0.3 |
| Nationalist | Thomas Eslick | 3,391 | 42.9 | +0.4 |
| Total formal votes | | 7,903 | 99.4 | +1.2 |
| Informal votes | | 48 | 0.6 | −1.2 |
| Turnout | | 7,951 | 61.9 | −4.1 |
| Labor hold | | Swing | +0.3 | |

=== Parramatta ===
1917 New South Wales state election: Parramatta
| Party | Candidate | Votes | % | ±% |
|---|---|---|---|---|
| Nationalist | Albert Bruntnell | 5,382 | 58.6 | +10.7 |
| Labor | Jock Garden | 3,772 | 41.1 | −2.1 |
| Independent | John Strachan | 26 | 0.3 | +0.3 |
| Total formal votes | | 9,180 | 98.9 | −0.1 |
| Informal votes | | 105 | 1.1 | +0.1 |
| Turnout | | 9,285 | 64.9 | −9.5 |
| Nationalist hold | | Swing | +10.7 | |

=== Petersham ===
1917 New South Wales state election: Petersham
| Party | Candidate | Votes | % | ±% |
|---|---|---|---|---|
| Nationalist | John Cohen | 4,441 | 61.7 | −38.3 |
| Labor | James Bourke | 2,253 | 31.3 | +31.3 |
| Independent | John Lucas | 507 | 7.0 | +7.0 |
| Total formal votes | | 7,201 | 99.3 | |
| Informal votes | | 49 | 0.7 | |
| Turnout | | 7,250 | 63.6 | |
| Nationalist hold | | Swing | −38.3 | |

=== Phillip ===
1917 New South Wales state election: Phillip
| Party | Candidate | Votes | % | ±% |
|---|---|---|---|---|
| Labor | John Doyle | 3,913 | 65.2 | −18.1 |
| Independent Labor | Richard Meagher | 2,056 | 34.3 | +34.3 |
| Ind. Socialist Labor | James Slade | 31 | 0.5 | +0.5 |
| Total formal votes | | 6,000 | 98.9 | +1.4 |
| Informal votes | | 66 | 1.1 | −1.4 |
| Turnout | | 6,066 | 61.4 | +4.5 |
| Labor hold | | Swing | −18.1 | |

The sitting member Richard Meagher was expelled from Labor in the November 1916 Labor split over conscription.

=== Raleigh ===
1917 New South Wales state election: Raleigh
| Party | Candidate | Votes | % | ±% |
|---|---|---|---|---|
| Nationalist | George Briner | 4,072 | 64.7 | +64.7 |
| Labor | Francis Collins | 2,221 | 35.3 | +21.4 |
| Total formal votes | | 6,293 | 99.2 | +2.6 |
| Informal votes | | 235 | 3.4 | −2.6 |
| Turnout | | 6,344 | 54.1 | −9.8 |
| Nationalist hold | | | | |

=== Randwick ===
1917 New South Wales state election: Randwick
| Party | Candidate | Votes | % | ±% |
|---|---|---|---|---|
| Nationalist | David Storey | 7,340 | 60.1 | +1.8 |
| Labor | Bob O'Halloran | 4,879 | 39.9 | +1.6 |
| Total formal votes | | 12,219 | 99.0 | +2.1 |
| Informal votes | | 127 | 1.0 | −2.1 |
| Turnout | | 12,346 | 59.8 | +2.8 |
| Nationalist hold | | Swing | +1.8 | |

=== Redfern ===
1917 New South Wales state election: Redfern
| Party | Candidate | Votes | % | ±% |
|---|---|---|---|---|
| Labor | William McKell | 4,757 | 66.2 | −2.2 |
| Nationalist | James McGowen | 2,388 | 33.2 | +3.5 |
| Ind. Socialist Labor | Henry Ostler | 42 | 0.6 | −1.4 |
| Total formal votes | | 7,187 | 99.1 | +1.5 |
| Informal votes | | 64 | 0.9 | −1.5 |
| Turnout | | 7,251 | 60.6 | −1.4 |
| Labor hold | | Swing | −2.2 | |

The sitting member James McGowen was expelled from Labor in the November 1916 Labor split over conscription.

=== Rozelle ===
1917 New South Wales state election: Rozelle
| Party | Candidate | Votes | % | ±% |
|---|---|---|---|---|
| Labor | John Quirk | 4,204 | 62.0 | −4.1 |
| Nationalist | Alfred Reed | 2,576 | 38.0 | +4.1 |
| Total formal votes | | 6,780 | 99.0 | +0.4 |
| Informal votes | | 69 | 1.0 | −0.4 |
| Turnout | | 6,849 | 60.4 | −3.8 |
| Labor hold | | Swing | −4.1 | |

The sitting member was James Mercer (Nationalist) was expelled from Labor in the November 1916 Labor split over conscription, and did not contest the election.

=== Ryde ===
1917 New South Wales state election: Ryde
| Party | Candidate | Votes | % | ±% |
|---|---|---|---|---|
| Nationalist | William Thompson | 6,834 | 65.0 | +0.4 |
| Labor | William Hutchison | 2,610 | 24.8 | −6.5 |
| Independent | Norman McIntosh | 1,067 | 10.2 | +10.2 |
| Total formal votes | | 10,511 | 99.3 | +1.6 |
| Informal votes | | 73 | 0.7 | −1.6 |
| Turnout | | 10,584 | 60.0 | −10.6 |
| Nationalist hold | | Swing | +0.4 | |

=== St George ===
1917 New South Wales state election: St George
| Party | Candidate | Votes | % | ±% |
|---|---|---|---|---|
| Nationalist | William Bagnall | 7,414 | 64.9 | +15.3 |
| Labor | Arthur Dengate | 4,010 | 35.1 | −10.0 |
| Total formal votes | | 11,424 | 99.2 | +0.3 |
| Informal votes | | 91 | 0.8 | −0.3 |
| Turnout | | 11,515 | 70.3 | −4.5 |
| Member changed to Nationalist from Labor | | | | |

The sitting member William Bagnall was expelled from Labor in the November 1916 Labor split over conscription.

=== St Leonards ===
1917 New South Wales state election: St Leonards
| Party | Candidate | Votes | % | ±% |
|---|---|---|---|---|
| Nationalist | Arthur Cocks | 3,992 | 65.5 | +11.4 |
| Labor | Robert Edwards | 2,052 | 33.7 | −10.0 |
| Independent | Frederick Clancy | 53 | 0.9 | +0.9 |
| Total formal votes | | 6,097 | 98.7 | +1.6 |
| Informal votes | | 80 | 1.3 | −1.6 |
| Turnout | | 6,177 | 51.4 | −11.6 |
| Nationalist hold | | Swing | +11.4 | |

=== Singleton ===
1917 New South Wales state election: Singleton
| Party | Candidate | Votes | % | ±% |
|---|---|---|---|---|
| Nationalist | James Fallick | 2,905 | 51.4 | −1.4 |
| Labor | Richard Bramston | 2,505 | 44.3 | +4.2 |
| Independent | Valdemar Olling | 131 | 2.3 | +2.3 |
| Independent | Leslie Hewitt | 114 | 2.0 | −5.2 |
| Total formal votes | | 5,655 | 98.5 | +2.1 |
| Informal votes | | 88 | 1.5 | −2.1 |
| Turnout | | 5,743 | 56.8 | −9.7 |
| Nationalist hold | | Swing | −1.4 | |

=== Sturt ===
1917 New South Wales state election: Sturt
| Party | Candidate | Votes | % | ±% |
|---|---|---|---|---|
| Labor | Percy Brookfield | 4,013 | 57.1 | |
| Ind. Nationalist | Francis Harvey | 3,020 | 42.9 | |
| Total formal votes | | 7,033 | 99.5 | |
| Informal votes | | 36 | 0.5 | |
| Turnout | | 7,069 | 62.3 | |
| Labor hold | | | | |

=== Surry Hills ===
1917 New South Wales state election: Surry Hills
| Party | Candidate | Votes | % | ±% |
|---|---|---|---|---|
| Labor | Arthur Buckley | 3,585 | 65.5 | −0.1 |
| Nationalist | Percy Daly | 1,550 | 28.3 | +28.3 |
| Independent | Thomas Kohan | 272 | 5.0 | +5.0 |
| Independent | John Eaton | 39 | 0.7 | +0.7 |
| Ind. Socialist Labor | Ludwig Klausen | 26 | 0.5 | +0.5 |
| Total formal votes | | 5,472 | 98.8 | +0.5 |
| Informal votes | | 66 | 1.2 | −0.5 |
| Turnout | | 5,538 | 47.1 | −12.9 |
| Labor hold | | Swing | −0.1 | |

The sitting member Henry Hoyle (Nationalist) was expelled from Labor in the November 1916 Labor split over conscription, and did not contest the election.

=== Tamworth ===
1917 New South Wales state election: Tamworth
| Party | Candidate | Votes | % | ±% |
|---|---|---|---|---|
| Nationalist | Frank Chaffey | 3,682 | 53.1 | +53.1 |
| Independent | Robert Levien | 3,246 | 46.9 | +15.6 |
| Total formal votes | | 6,928 | 99.1 | +2.1 |
| Informal votes | | 65 | 0.9 | −2.1 |
| Turnout | | 6,993 | 68.1 | −6.1 |
| Nationalist hold | | | | |

=== Tenterfield ===
1917 New South Wales state election: Tenterfield
| Party | Candidate | Votes | % | ±% |
|---|---|---|---|---|
| Nationalist | Charles Lee | 4,090 | 70.7 | |
| Labor | William Sturgess | 1,691 | 29.3 | |
| Total formal votes | | 5,781 | 99.1 | |
| Informal votes | | 50 | 0.9 | |
| Turnout | | 5,831 | 54.3 | |
| Nationalist hold | | | | |

=== Upper Hunter ===
1917 New South Wales state election: Upper Hunter
| Party | Candidate | Votes | % | ±% |
|---|---|---|---|---|
| Nationalist | Mac Abbott | 3,811 | 55.7 | +5.6 |
| Labor | Robert Kennedy | 3,034 | 44.3 | +2.8 |
| Total formal votes | | 6,845 | 99.0 | +2.0 |
| Informal votes | | 66 | 1.0 | −2.0 |
| Turnout | | 6,911 | 60.7 | −11.7 |
| Nationalist hold | | Swing | +5.6 | |

=== Wagga Wagga ===
1917 New South Wales state election: Wagga Wagga
| Party | Candidate | Votes | % | ±% |
|---|---|---|---|---|
| Nationalist | George Beeby | 3,777 | 52.8 | +4.0 |
| Labor | Walter Boston | 3,371 | 47.2 | −4.0 |
| Total formal votes | | 7,148 | 98.7 | +1.3 |
| Informal votes | | 97 | 1.3 | −1.3 |
| Turnout | | 7,245 | 68.8 | −4.5 |
| Nationalist gain from Labor | | Swing | +4.0 | |

=== Wallsend ===
1917 New South Wales state election: Wallsend
| Party | Candidate | Votes | % | ±% |
|---|---|---|---|---|
| Labor | John Estell | unopposed | | |
| Labor hold | | | | |

=== Waverley ===
1917 New South Wales state election: Waverley
| Party | Candidate | Votes | % | ±% |
|---|---|---|---|---|
| Nationalist | Charles Oakes | 5,136 | 56.7 | +13.8 |
| Labor | James Fingleton | 3,919 | 43.3 | +5.7 |
| Total formal votes | | 9,055 | 99.2 | +1.7 |
| Informal votes | | 69 | 0.8 | −1.7 |
| Turnout | | 9,124 | 63.9 | −6.0 |
| Nationalist gain from Labor | | Swing | +7.0 | |

=== Wickham ===
1917 New South Wales state election: Wickham
| Party | Candidate | Votes | % | ±% |
|---|---|---|---|---|
| Nationalist | William Grahame | 4,982 | 53.9 | +22.1 |
| Labor | Christopher Pattinson | 4,260 | 46.1 | −22.1 |
| Total formal votes | | 9,242 | 99.2 | +0.9 |
| Informal votes | | 77 | 0.8 | −0.9 |
| Turnout | | 9,319 | 63.1 | −10.0 |
| Member changed to Nationalist from Labor | | | | |

The sitting member William Grahame was expelled from Labor in the November 1916 Labor split over conscription.

=== Willoughby ===
1917 New South Wales state election: Willoughby
| Party | Candidate | Votes | % | ±% |
|---|---|---|---|---|
| Nationalist | Reginald Weaver | 4,646 | 51.7 | +20.6 |
| Labor | John Chambers | 2,398 | 26.7 | −15.9 |
| Independent | John Haynes | 1,526 | 17.0 | +17.0 |
| Independent | Frederick Cowdroy | 407 | 4.5 | +4.5 |
| Independent | William Shepherd | 13 | 0.1 | +0.1 |
| Total formal votes | | 8,990 | 98.9 | −0.1 |
| Informal votes | | 96 | 1.1 | +0.1 |
| Turnout | | 9,086 | 63.6 | −8.0 |
| Nationalist gain from Independent | | Swing | +20.6 | |

=== Willyama ===
1917 New South Wales state election: Willyama
| Party | Candidate | Votes | % | ±% |
|---|---|---|---|---|
| Labor | Jabez Wright | 3,381 | 64.6 | −8.7 |
| Ind. Nationalist | Brian Doe | 1,851 | 35.4 | +35.4 |
| Total formal votes | | 5,232 | 99.5 | +1.8 |
| Informal votes | | 24 | 0.5 | −1.8 |
| Turnout | | 5,256 | 59.2 | −3.6 |
| Labor hold | | Swing | −8.7 | |

=== Wollondilly ===
1917 New South Wales state election: Wollondilly
| Party | Candidate | Votes | % | ±% |
|---|---|---|---|---|
| Nationalist | George Fuller | 4,425 | 56.8 | −0.8 |
| Labor | Daniel Chalker | 3,364 | 43.2 | +9.3 |
| Total formal votes | | 7,789 | 99.1 | +1.9 |
| Informal votes | | 71 | 0.9 | −1.9 |
| Turnout | | 7,860 | 65.6 | −0.8 |
| Nationalist hold | | Swing | −0.8 | |

=== Wollongong ===
1917 New South Wales state election: Wollongong
| Party | Candidate | Votes | % | ±% |
|---|---|---|---|---|
| Labor | Billy Davies | 4,857 | 55.3 | −16.3 |
| Nationalist | John Nicholson | 3,809 | 43.4 | +19.8 |
| Ind. Socialist Labor | Joseph Charlton | 113 | 1.3 | +1.3 |
| Total formal votes | | 8,779 | 98.7 | +1.7 |
| Informal votes | | 118 | 1.3 | −1.7 |
| Turnout | | 8,897 | 63.0 | +2.4 |
| Labor hold | | Swing | −16.3 | |

The sitting member John Nicholson was expelled from Labor in the November 1916 Labor split over conscription.

=== Woollahra ===
1917 New South Wales state election: Woollahra
| Party | Candidate | Votes | % | ±% |
|---|---|---|---|---|
| Nationalist | William Latimer | 3,925 | 56.4 | +11.8 |
| Labor | Chester Davies | 3,034 | 43.6 | +9.6 |
| Total formal votes | | 6,959 | 98.9 | −0.1 |
| Informal votes | | 76 | 1.1 | +0.1 |
| Turnout | | 7,035 | 63.9 | −4.1 |
| Nationalist hold | | Swing | +6.2 | |

=== Yass ===
1917 New South Wales state election: Yass
| Party | Candidate | Votes | % | ±% |
|---|---|---|---|---|
| Labor | Greg McGirr | 4,524 | 57.8 | +7.1 |
| Nationalist | Patrick Bourke | 3,308 | 42.2 | +9.3 |
| Total formal votes | | 7,832 | 98.7 | +1.6 |
| Informal votes | | 100 | 1.3 | −1.6 |
| Turnout | | 7,932 | 70.0 | −5.1 |
| Labor hold | | Swing | +7.1 | |

== See also ==
- Candidates of the 1917 New South Wales state election
- Members of the New South Wales Legislative Assembly, 1917–1920
