= Electoral results for the district of Macquarie =

Election results for Macquarie, New South Wales, Australia

Macquarie, until 1910 The Macquarie, an electoral district of the Legislative Assembly in the Australian state of New South Wales, was created in 1894, re-created in 1904, retaining nothing but the name, then abolished in 1920.

Election	Member	Party
1894	James Tonkin	Free Trade
1895	William Hurley	Protectionist
1898	William Hurley	Protectionist
1901	William Hurley	Progressive
Election	Member	Party
1904	Thomas Thrower	Labour
1907	Charles Barton	Liberal Reform
1910	Thomas Thrower	Labor
1913	Thomas Thrower	Labor
1917	Thomas Thrower	Labor
1917 by	Patrick McGirr	Labor

== Election results ==
=== Elections in the 1910s ===
==== 1917 by-election ====
1917 Macquarie by-election Saturday 28 July
Party	Candidate	Votes	%	±%
Labor	Patrick McGirr	3,521	50.8	−0.1
Nationalist	Murdock McLeod	3,232	46.6	−2.6
Australian Producers Co-Operative Party	Frank Foster	182	2.6	
Total formal votes		6,935	99.5	+0.5
Informal votes		34	0.5	−0.5
Turnout		6,969	65.1 (Note: based on an electoral roll of 10,704 at the 1917 state election.)	−7.3
Labor hold		Swing	N/A	

Thomas Thrower (Labor) died.

==== 1917 ====
1917 New South Wales state election: Macquarie
Party	Candidate	Votes	%	±%
Labor	Thomas Thrower	3,899	50.9	+0.5
Nationalist	Murdock McLeod	3,769	49.1	−0.5
Total formal votes		7,668	99.0	+1.6
Informal votes		80	1.0	−1.6
Turnout		7,748	72.4	−7.3
Labor hold		Swing	+0.5	

==== 1913 ====
1913 New South Wales state election: Macquarie
Party	Candidate	Votes	%	±%
Labor	Thomas Thrower	4,055	50.4	
Farmers and Settlers	Reginald Weaver (Note: Also endorsed by Liberal Reform.)	3,992	49.6	
Total formal votes		8,047	97.4	
Informal votes		216	2.6	
Turnout		8,263	79.7	
Labor hold				

==== 1910 ====
1910 New South Wales state election: The Macquarie
Party	Candidate	Votes	%	±%
Labour	Thomas Thrower	3,698	52.8	+3.3
Liberal Reform	James Burns	3,311	47.2	−3.3
Total formal votes		7,009	98.3	+0.3
Informal votes		121	1.7	−0.3
Turnout		7,130	70.3	−2.9
Labour gain from Liberal Reform				

=== Elections in the 1900s ===
==== 1907 ====
1907 New South Wales state election: The Macquarie
Party	Candidate	Votes	%	±%
Liberal Reform	Charles Barton	3,344	50.5	
Labour	Thomas Thrower	3,279	49.5	
Total formal votes		6,623	98.0	
Informal votes		136	2.0	
Turnout		6,759	73.2	
Liberal Reform gain from Labour				

==== 1904 ====
1904 New South Wales state election: The Macquarie
Party	Candidate	Votes	%	±%
Labour	Thomas Thrower	2,566	50.2	
Liberal Reform	Simeon Phillips	2,476	48.5	
Independent	John Collins	38	0.7	
Independent Liberal	Reginald Atkinson	27	0.5	
Total formal votes		5,107	95.7	
Informal votes		230	4.3	
Turnout		5,337	63.2	
Labour win		(new seat)		

The Macquarie electorate retained nothing but the name, the former district being divided between Bathurst, Blayney and Hartley. The member for The Macquarie was William Hurley (Progressive) who was appointed to the Legislative Council. The district re-created in 1904 consisted of parts of the abolished seats of Dubbo and Wellington. The member for Dubbo was Simeon Phillips (Liberal Reform). The member for Wellington was John Haynes (Liberal Reform) who unsuccessfully contested Mudgee.

District recreated

==== 1901 ====
1901 New South Wales state election: Macquarie
Party	Candidate	Votes	%	±%
Progressive	William Hurley	849	58.8	+2.7
Liberal Reform	John Miller	594	41.2	+4.8
Total formal votes		1,443	98.5	+0.6
Informal votes		22	1.5	−0.6
Turnout		1,465	59.1	+2.8
Progressive hold				

=== Elections in the 1890s ===
==== 1898 ====
1898 New South Wales colonial election: Macquarie
Party	Candidate	Votes	%	±%
National Federal	William Hurley	724	55.1	
Free Trade	Robert Thompson	478	36.4	
Independent	Francis Foster	96	7.3	
Independent	David Todd	8	0.6	
Ind. Free Trade	William Paul	6	0.5	
Ind. Free Trade	Allen Carmichael	2	0.2	
Total formal votes		1,314	97.9	
Informal votes		28	2.1	
Turnout		1,342	56.3	
National Federal hold				

==== 1895 ====
1895 New South Wales colonial election: Macquarie
Party	Candidate	Votes	%	±%
Protectionist	William Hurley	575	42.8	
Free Trade	James Tonkin	438	32.6	
Ind. Free Trade	William Paul	233	17.4	
Labour	Francis Foster	97	7.2	
Total formal votes		1,343	99.2	
Informal votes		11	0.8	
Turnout		1,354	60.7	
Protectionist gain from Free Trade				

==== 1894 ====
1894 New South Wales colonial election: Macquarie
Party	Candidate	Votes	%	±%
Free Trade	James Tonkin	637	38.6	
Protectionist	William Hurley	542	32.9	
Labour	John Skelton	237	14.4	
Ind. Protectionist	John Hughes	174	10.6	
Ind. Free Trade	Henry Brown	60	3.6	
Total formal votes		1,650	98.3	
Informal votes		28	1.7	
Turnout		1,678	74.3	
Free Trade win		(new seat)		
