= 1919 Paddington state by-election =

1919 Paddington state by-election may refer to:

- 1919 Paddington state by-election 1, held on 24 May 1919 due to the resignation of John Osborne (Labor)
- 1919 Paddington state by-election 2, held on 26 July 1919 due to the death of Lawrence O'Hara (Labor)

== See also ==
- List of New South Wales state by-elections
