= Electoral results for the district of Lyndhurst (New South Wales) =

Election results for Lyndhurst, New South Wales, Australia

Lyndhurst, an electoral district of the Legislative Assembly in the Australian state of New South Wales, had one incarnation, from 1913 to 1920.

Election	Member	Party
1913	Thomas Waddell	Farmers and Settlers / Nationalist
1917	Claude Bushell	Labor

== Election results ==
=== Elections in the 1910s ===
==== 1917 ====
1917 New South Wales state election: Lyndhurst
Party	Candidate	Votes	%	±%
Labor	Claude Bushell	4,071	50.7	+1.8
Nationalist	Thomas Waddell	3,967	49.3	−1.8
Total formal votes		8,038	98.9	+1.1
Informal votes		88	1.1	−1.1
Turnout		8,126	70.6	−1.0
Labor gain from Nationalist		Swing	+1.8	

==== 1913 ====
1913 New South Wales state election: Lyndhurst
Party	Candidate	Votes	%	±%
Farmers and Settlers	Thomas Waddell (Note: Also endorsed by Liberal Reform.)	4,215	51.1	
Labor	Guy Arkins	4,033	48.9	
Total formal votes		8,248	97.8	
Informal votes		187	2.2	
Turnout		8,435	71.6	
Farmers and Settlers win		(new seat)		
