= 1917 Macquarie state by-election =

Election result for Macquarie, New South Wales, Australia

The 1917 Macquarie state by-election was held for the New South Wales state electoral district of Macquarie on 28 July 1917. The by-election was triggered by the death of Australian Labor Party MP Thomas Thrower, who had died only three months after being re-elected at the 1917 state election.

Labor preselected as their candidate Patrick McGirr, a member of the Parkes Land Board and the brother of Greg McGirr, the state member for Yass. McGirr was selected overwhelmingly from a broad field that included Iron Trades Federation secretary E. M. Davies, Amalgamated Railway and Tramway Association assistant secretary R. Corish, radical Sydney Wharf Laborers' Union president William McCristal and unsuccessful federal or state election candidates T. Lavelle, I. A. Vitnell, Tom Brown and W. J. Boston.

The preselection process for the new conservative Nationalist Party was somewhat chaotic, with different meetings of local interests and organisations that had come together to form the new party recommending different candidates to the state executive. The eventual executive decision largely came down to two candidates: Wellington miller Murdoch McLeod and Dubbo businessman H. T. Blackett, but also saw some support for former federal MP Ernest Carr, who had lost his seat at that year's election, with McLeod ultimately endorsed as the candidate.

A third candidate, former federal MP Frank Foster, is often recorded as having contested as an independent or "Independent Nationalist", but campaigned for his own new minor party, the Australian Producers Co-Operative Party. Foster had been a Labor MP until losing his seat in 1913 and had left the party in the 1916 Labor split, but had not joined the Nationalist Party and had instead sought to form his own party taking a middle position between the two parties.

McGirr won the by-election, finishing 239 votes ahead of McLeod with Foster a distant third, an increase on the Labor majority from the general election. McGirr was reported to have polled well in the larger centres while McLeod had performed better in the rural booths. The pro-Labor National Advocate newspaper in Bathurst described the result as a "magnificent success" that showed that the party was recovering from "the defection of the renegades" in the 1916 party split; they also noted that the result in the usually marginal seat was "the greatest for over nine years" and suggested the margin would have been larger had it not been for Foster's candidacy. The more conservative Evening News in Sydney downplayed the result, stating "the two parties simply maintained their respective positions: no advantage has been gained by either side", but drew attention to the Nationalist failure to win the seat despite dedicating tremendous resources, stating "the eloquence of nearly every Minister in the New South Wales Government was released upon the electors of Macquarie, but it fell short of success. This needs some explanation."

== Dates ==
Date	Event
21 June 1917	Death of Thomas Thrower.
30 June 1917	Writ of election issued by the Speaker of the Legislative Assembly.
9 July 1917	Nominations
28 July 1917	Polling day
11 August 1917	Return of writ

== Results ==
1917 Macquarie by-election Saturday 28 July
Party	Candidate	Votes	%	±%
Labor	Patrick McGirr	3,521	50.8	−0.1
Nationalist	Murdock McLeod	3,232	46.6	−2.6
Australian Producers Co-Operative Party	Frank Foster	182	2.6	
Total formal votes		6,935	99.5	+0.5
Informal votes		34	0.5	−0.5
Turnout		6,969	65.1 (Note: based on an electoral roll of 10,704 at the 1917 state election.)	−7.3
Labor hold		Swing	N/A	

== See also ==
- Electoral results for the district of Macquarie
- List of New South Wales state by-elections
