= May 1919 Paddington state by-election =

Election result for Paddington, New South Wales, Australia

A by-election was held for the New South Wales Legislative Assembly electorate of Paddington on 24 May 1919 because of the resignation of John Osborne (Labor) who had accepted an appointment to the Metropolitan Meat Industry Board. The board was responsible for the control and maintenance of abattoirs, cattle sale yards, meat markets, and slaughterhouses in the greater Sydney region. H. V. Evatt described the appointment as intended to deprive Labor of one of its better political organisers ahead of the 1920 election.

== Dates ==
| Date | Event |
|---|---|
| 15 April 1919 | John Osborne resigned. |
| 30 April 1919 | Writ of election issued by the Governor. (Note: Ordinarily the writ for a by-election would be issued by the Speaker of the Legislative Assembly, however the position of speaker was vacant since the resignation of John Cohen on 30 January 1919 and the writ was issued by the Governor.) |
| 2 May 1919 | John Osborne appointed to the Metropolitan Meat Industry Board. |
| 10 May 1919 | Nominations |
| 24 May 1919 | Polling day |
| 7 June 1919 | Return of writ |

== Result ==
1919 Paddington by-election Saturday 24 May
| Party | Candidate | Votes | % | ±% |
|---|---|---|---|---|
| Labor | Lawrence O'Hara | 2,613 | 58.1 | +1.0 |
| Nationalist | William Harris | 955 | 22.1 | −20.8 |
| Independent | James Thomson | 869 | 19.3 | |
| Independent | James Jones | 19 | 0.4 | |
| Total formal votes | | 4,496 | 98.7 | −0.7 |
| Informal votes | | 59 | 1.3 | +0.7 |
| Turnout | | 4,555 | 35.5 (Note: Estimate based on a roll of 12,842 at the 1917 election.) | −26.4 |
| Labor hold | | Swing | N/A | |

== Aftermath ==
Lawrence O'Hara's service would be brief, dying just 21 days later on 14 June 1919 as a result of the influenza pandemic. The resulting by-election was held on 26 July 1919.

== See also ==
- Electoral results for the district of Paddington
- List of New South Wales state by-elections
