= Ronald Maxwell =

Ronald or Ron Maxwell may refer to:

- Ronald F. Maxwell (born 1949), American film director
- Ron Maxwell (trade unionist) (1908–1982), Australian trade unionist and communist
- Ronald Douglas Maxwell (1919–1941), British soldier
