= July 1919 Paddington state by-election =

- 26 July 1919

Electoral district of Paddington in the New South Wales Legislative Assembly
- Registered: 11,419
- Turnout: 26.9% (▼8.6)
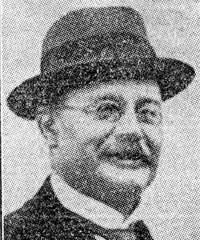
	First party	Second party
		ASP
Candidate	John Birt	Arthur Reardon
Party	Labor	Socialist
Popular vote	2,678	208
Percentage	88.1%	6.8%
Swing	▲30.0	▲6.8
MP before election
Lawrence O'Hara
Labor
Elected MP
John Birt
Labor

The July 1919 Paddington state by-election was held on 26 July 1919 to elect the member for Paddington in the New South Wales Legislative Assembly, following the death of Labor Party MP Lawrence O'Hara.

O'Hara had been elected just 21 days prior to his death at the May 1919 Paddington by-election. He had not yet been sworn in as an MP and was attending the Labor conference the week before his death, but after leaving the conference he came down with influenza amid a global pandemic and died several days later.

The July by-election was won by Labor's John Birt with a swing of 30% against an Australian Socialist Party candidate and an independent.

== Key events ==
- 14 June 1919 − Lawrence O'Hara died
- 11 July 1919 − Writ of election issued by the Governor (Note: Ordinarily the writ for a by-election would be issued by the Speaker of the Legislative Assembly, however the position of Speaker was vacant since the resignation of John Cohen on 30 January 1919 and the writ was issued by Governor Sir Walter Edward Davidson instead.)
- 18 July 1919 − Candidate nominations
- 26 July 1919 − Polling day
- 2 August 1919 − Return of writ

== Candidates ==
Party	Candidate	Background
Labor	John Birt	President of the Paddington Labor League
Independent	James Jones	Artist and candidate at the May by-election
Socialist	Arthur Reardon	Secretary of the Australian Socialist Party

Additionally, the Nationalist Party was expected to contest again (having received 22.1% of the vote at the May by-election) but this did not eventuate, with the party citing the circumstances of the by-election as its reason for not running.

== Result ==
July 1919 Paddington state by-election
Party	Candidate	Votes	%	±%
Labor	John Birt	2,678	88.1	+30.0
Socialist	Arthur Reardon	208	6.8	+6.8
Independent	James Jones	153	5.0	+4.6
Total formal votes		3,039	99.1	+0.4
Informal votes		28	0.9	−0.4
Turnout		3,067	26.9	−8.6
Labor hold		Swing	N/A	

== See also ==
- Electoral results for the district of Paddington
- List of New South Wales state by-elections
