= Australian Socialist Party =

Australian Socialist Party may refer to:

- Australian Socialist Party (1912)
- Victorian Socialists, who have adopted the name for their federal level party
- Communist Party of Australia (1971), which was originally called the "Socialist Party of Australia" until 1996

or Australian Political parties called the "Socialist Party":

- Socialist Action (Australia), which was called the "Socialist Party" until 2019.

or Australian National Socialist parties:

- National Socialist Party of Australia
- Australian National Socialist Party

Other Australian political parties with similar names include:

- The Industrial Socialist Labor Party
- The Socialist Labor Party
- The Socialist Equality Party

== See also ==
- Socialism in Australia for a history of Socialism in Australia and a list of related political parties.
