= Ernest Broughton =

Australian politician (1865–1917)

Ernest Clement Vernon Broughton (29 January 1865 – 15 August 1917) was a politician in New South Wales, Australia. He was a Member of the New South Wales Legislative Assembly and a mayor of the Municipality of Ashfield.

== Early life ==
Broughton was born on 29 January 1865 at Kangaroo Point, Brisbane, the son of Alfred Delves Broughton (the police magistrate at Drayton, Queensland) and Clemence Lamonneire dit Fattorini.

On 15 February 1890 Broughton married Amelia Lockyer (Millie) Newcombe, the daughter of William Newcombe, at St Peters Church, Woolloomooloo.

Their home in Ashfield was called Delves, a Broughton family name. They also owned a summer cottage Sur-le-mer at Cronulla.

In 1909 after a fiery meeting, he was appointed as the second President of the New South Wales Rugby League, replacing fellow politician Henry Hoyle, one of the three founding fathers of Rugby League in Australia. Broughton though lasted just 3 weeks before illness forced him to stand down from the role. He was replaced by yet another politician, Edward O'Sullivan.

== Politics ==
Broughton was a member of the Progressive Party and later the Liberal Reform party.

In 1901 and 1902, he was mayor of the Municipality of Ashfield.

He represented the electoral district of Sydney-King in the New South Wales Legislative Assembly from 3 July 1901 to 16 July 1904. He then represented electoral district of King from 6 August 1904 to 19 August 1907 and again from 10 September 1907 to 14 September 1910.

== Later life ==
Broughton died on 15 August 1917 at The Pines Hospital, Randwick, Sydney, following a twelve-month illness. He was buried in Randwick cemetery.

Civic offices
Preceded by John Mills	Mayor of Ashfield; 1901–1903	Succeeded by Arthur Miller
New South Wales Legislative Assembly
Preceded by George Reid	Member for Sydney-King; 1901–1904	District abolished
New district	Member for King; 1904–1910	Succeeded by James Morrish
Sporting positions
Preceded by Henry Hoyle	President of the New South Wales Rugby Football League; 1909	Succeeded by Edward O'Sullivan
