= Daniel Clyne =

Australian politician

The Honourable Daniel Clyne OBE
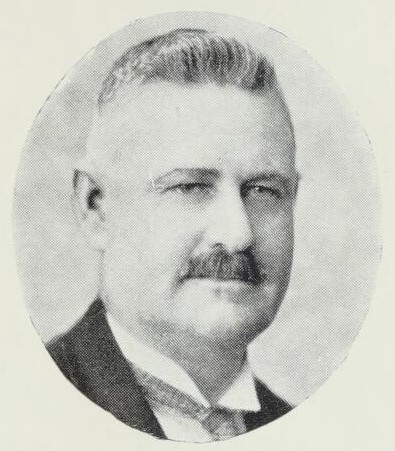
- Clyne in 1932

20th Speaker of the New South Wales Legislative Assembly
- In office 28 May 1941 – 27 May 1947
- Preceded by: Reginald Weaver
- Succeeded by: Bill Lamb

Personal details
- Born: Daniel Clyne; 28 December 1879 Bathurst, New South Wales
- Died: 28 August 1965 (aged 85) Ashfield, New South Wales
- Party: Labor Party, Australian Labor Party (NSW)

Daniel Clyne OBE (28 December 1879 – 28 August 1965) was an Australian politician. He was a member of the New South Wales Legislative Assembly from 1927 until 1956 and, variously, a member of the Labor Party (ALP) and Lang Labor. He was the Speaker of the New South Wales Legislative Assembly between 1941 and 1947.

Clyne was born in Bathurst. He was the son of a farmer, was educated to elementary level at convent schools and from age 14 worked as a fettler for the New South Wales Government Railways. As an official in the Australian Railways Union he was dismissed for taking part in the 1917 general strike. He subsequently advanced in the Labor movement as an official of the Storemen and Packers' Union. At the 1927 state election, Clyne was elected to the New South Wales Legislative Assembly as the Labor member for the new seat of King. He retained the seat for the next nine elections during a stormy period in ALP history (see Lang Labor) and retired at the 1956 state election. With the election of the Labor government of William McKell in 1941, Clyne was elected unanimously by the Legislative Assembly as Speaker. He maintained this position for 6 years and the parliamentary web site states that he was: "impartial in his rulings and developed a reputation for treating members with great fairness".

== Honours ==
- King George V Silver Jubilee Medal, 1935.
- King George VI Coronation Medal, 1937.
- On 1 June 1949, he was granted by King George VI the use of the title "The Honourable" for life, for having served more than three years as speaker.
- Queen Elizabeth II Coronation Medal, 1953.
- Officer of the Order of the British Empire (OBE) in the 1957 New Year Honours list.

New South Wales Legislative Assembly
New district	Member for King; 1927–1956	Succeeded by Albert Sloss
Preceded by Reginald Weaver	Speaker of the New South Wales Legislative Assembly; 1941–1947	Succeeded by Bill Lamb
