= Charles Barton (New South Wales politician) =

Australian politician (1848–1912)

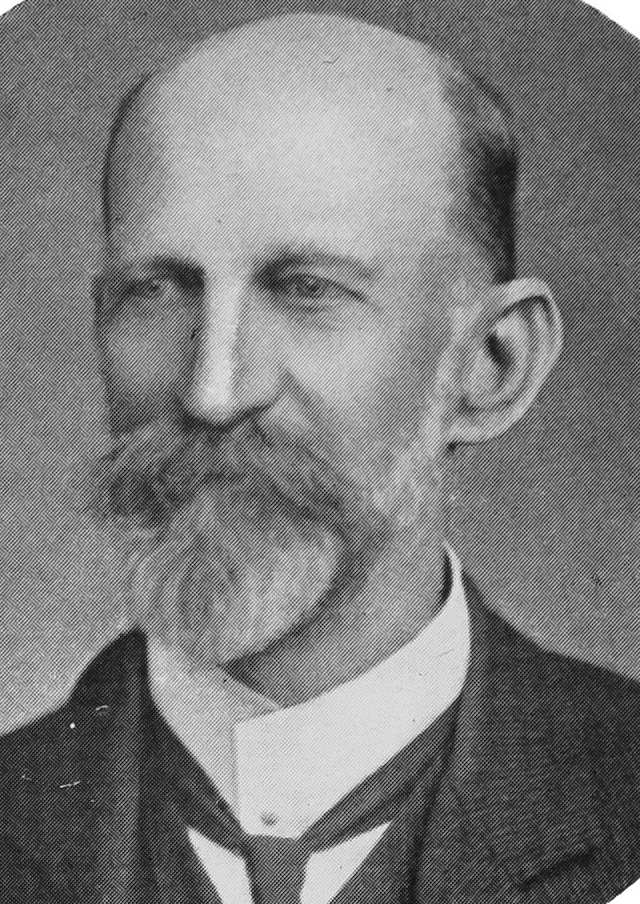
Charles Hampden Barton

Charles Hampden Barton (8 July 1848 – 21 June 1912) was an Australian politician.

He was born at Boree near Molong to grazier and retired naval officer Robert Johnston Barton and Emily Mary Darvall. Following his father's death, he moved with his mother to Gladesville and attended Sydney Grammar School. He worked for the Joint Stock Bank after leaving school, becoming manager of the Wellington branch from 1874 to 1900. On 6 December 1877, he married Annie Smith, with whom he would have eight children. In 1907, he was elected to the New South Wales Legislative Assembly as the Liberal member for Macquarie, but he retired in 1910 and died at Darlinghurst two years later.

His uncle, John Darvall, was a significant figure in the early years of the New South Wales Parliament, and his nephew Banjo Paterson was one of Australia's best-known poets.

New South Wales Legislative Assembly
Preceded by Thomas Thrower	Member for Macquarie; 1907–1910	Succeeded by Thomas Thrower
