= William Hurley (Australian politician) =

Australian politician

William Fergus Hurley (2 July 1848 – 28 March 1924) was an Australian politician.

He was born in Sydney to Farrell and Catherine Hurley; his father was a clerk. He worked as a mine manager before entering politics, notably managing the Sunny Corner mine near Bathurst, which pioneered water jacket smelting furnaces in New South Wales. In 1880 he married Lillian Pritchard, with whom he had four children. In 1895 he was elected to the New South Wales Legislative Assembly as the Protectionist member for Macquarie. He served until 1904, when the size of the Assembly was reduced and he was appointed to the New South Wales Legislative Council. Hurley remained in the upper house until his death at Burwood in 1924.

His brother John was also a member of the NSW parliament, as member for Central Cumberland (1872-1874) and Hartley (1876-1880), (1887-1891) and (1901-1907).

New South Wales Legislative Assembly
Preceded by James Tonkin	Member for Macquarie; 1895–1904	Succeeded by Thomas Thrower
