= Albert Sloss =

Australian politician

Albert Ross Sloss (15 February 1911 – 26 April 1990) was an Australian politician. He was a Labor member of the New South Wales Legislative Assembly from 1956 to 1973, representing the seat of King.

Sloss was born in Sydney to William Sloss, a Scottish migrant, and his wife Catherine O'Neill. He was educated at St Joseph's Sisters of Mercy School and Plunkett Street Public School before being employed by Sydney City Council from 1925 to 1939. In 1927 he joined the Labor Party, and was active in the Municipal and Shires' Employees Union from 1925. On 23 December 1931 he married Catherine Moffat, with whom he had two daughters.

In 1939, Sloss was elected to Sydney City Council for Phillip Ward; he would serve until 1941, and again for Macquarie Ward from 1950 to 1953. Sloss was also involved in the various Labor splits of the 1930s and 1940s, being a member of the State Labor Party. From 1941 to 1945 he served in the 2nd Australian Imperial Force and was a gunner during the bombing of Darwin. He returned to become a shipping clerk and waterside worker before resuming his political career.

In 1956, Sloss was elected to the New South Wales Legislative Assembly as the Labor member for King, succeeding the retiring member, Labor's Daniel Clyne. A safe seat, Sloss held it easily until its abolition in 1973, when he retired. He was deputy chairman of the parliamentary party from 1968 to 1973. Sloss died in Sydney in 1990.

New South Wales Legislative Assembly
Preceded by Daniel Clyne	Member for King; 1956–1973	Succeeded by Division abolished
