= Ron Maxwell (trade unionist) =

Ronald Alexander Maxwell (1908 – 27 October 1982) was an Australian trade unionist who was one of the first two communists to sit on Sydney City Council.

Maxwell was born in Balmain North to Percival and Eveline Maxwell. He was a wharf labourer and held a prominent role in the Wharf Labourers' Union. In 1953, in a surprise result, he was elected to Sydney City Council, being narrowly elected from the Communist Party ticket headed by Tom Wright. Maxwell and Wright were the first two communists elected to serve on the council. Maxwell served on the Works Committee and the Health and Recreations Committee, but was defeated for re-election in 1956. He died in 1982.
