= Patrick McGirr =

Australian politician

Patrick Michael McGirr (25 December 1874 – 13 April 1957) was an Australian politician.

== Biography ==
He was born in Parkes to farmer John Patrick McGirr and Mary O'Sullivan and was educated at St. Joseph's Convent. He left school at a young age to work in shearing sheds, funding the education of his brothers and future parliamentarians, James and Greg; he also became an active member of the Australian Workers' Union. He later became a successful businessman, dealing in cattle and owning a number of pastoral estates in the Forbes area, including at various times the Grawlin, Ralrida and Bundaburra estates, while also acquiring substantial property and business interests in Forbes township. He was an alderman of the Municipality of Parkes until 1917, a member of the Parkes Land Board from 1913 until 1917, and the vice-president of the Parkes branch of the Political Labor League.

He was elected to the New South Wales Legislative Assembly as the Labor member for Macquarie in a 1917 by-election caused by the death of Labor MP Thomas Thrower. He was narrowly defeated in 1920 running for the multi-member seat of Murrumbidgee, but in 1921 he was appointed to the New South Wales Legislative Council, in which he served until his retirement in 1955. Despite serving in the Legislative Council for 34 years, he remained a lifelong supporter of its abolition. He remained an active farmer until 1950, when he retired to Bellevue Hill. He died there in 1957.

New South Wales Legislative Assembly
Preceded by Thomas Thrower	Member for Macquarie; 1917–1920	Abolished
