= Australian Socialist Party (1912) =

Australian Socialist Party Socialist Federation of Australia (1907–1912)
- Abbreviation: ASP; SFA
- Founded: July 1907; 119 years ago
- Dissolved: August 1922; 103 years ago
- Headquarters: Socialist Hall, Pitt Street, Sydney, New South Wales
- Newspaper: The International Socialist; The International Communist
- Ideology: Socialism; Marxism; Communism
- Political position: Far-left
- International affiliation: Third International (1919–1922)
- Party branches: Victorian Socialist (1907–1912)
- Colours: Red

Red flag

The Australian Socialist Party (ASP) was a minor Australian far-left political party. Formed in 1912 as the reorganised Socialist Federation of Australia (SFA), which itself was founded in 1907, the ASP was active between the early 1910s and the beginning of the 1920s before dissolving in 1922. However much of its members had participated in the establishment of the Third International-aligned Communist Party in 1920.

The party was opposed to Labor, stating in 1910: “The Labor Party does not clearly and unambiguously avow socialism, nor does it teach it: it is unlike any other working[-]class creation in the world in that it builds no socialist movement, issues no socialist books, debates no socialist problems. It is not international, it is not Marxian. In politics and practice it is liberalism under a new name; in utterance and ideal it is bourgeois.” The party's stated objective, as stated in its 1912 principles, was “The socialisation of the means of production, distribution, and exchange.” In August 1922 the Comintern officially recognised the Communist Party of Australia (CPA). As a result, many of the ASP members left the party to join the CPA and the party dissolved.

The Brisbane branch of the party established the first Queensland Communist Party.
