= James Morrish =

Australian politician

James John Morrish (20 January 1868 – 10 October 1956) was an Australian politician.

Born in Carmarthen, Wales, to master butcher Francis Morrish and Margaret Morgan, he arrived in New South Wales around 1896 and worked as a barman. He helped found the Hotel, Club, Restaurant and Caterers' Employees' Union and was its secretary. An early socialist, he was elected to the New South Wales Legislative Assembly as the Labor member for King in 1910 and served until 1917, although he left the party over the conscription issue and joined the Nationalist Party. In 1927 he was declared bankrupt; he was discharged in 1928. Morrish died at Hurstville in 1956.

New South Wales Legislative Assembly
Preceded by Ernest Broughton	Member for King; 1910–1917	Succeeded by Tom Smith
