= Electoral district of Lyndhurst (New South Wales) =

Former state electoral district of New South Wales, Australia

Lyndhurst was an electoral district of the Legislative Assembly in the Australian state of New South Wales, created in 1913, partly replacing Blayney and Belubula, and named after and including Lyndhurst. It was abolished in 1920 with the introduction of proportional representation and largely absorbed into Bathurst.

== Members for Lyndhurst ==
Member	Party	Period
Thomas Waddell	Farmers and Settlers	1913–1917
Thomas Waddell	Nationalist	1917–1917
Claude Bushell	Labor	1917–1920

== Election results ==
=== 1917 ===
1917 New South Wales state election: Lyndhurst
Party	Candidate	Votes	%	±%
Labor	Claude Bushell	4,071	50.7	+1.8
Nationalist	Thomas Waddell	3,967	49.3	−1.8
Total formal votes		8,038	98.9	+1.1
Informal votes		88	1.1	−1.1
Turnout		8,126	70.6	−1.0
Labor gain from Nationalist		Swing	+1.8	
