= Lawrence O'Hara =

Australian politician

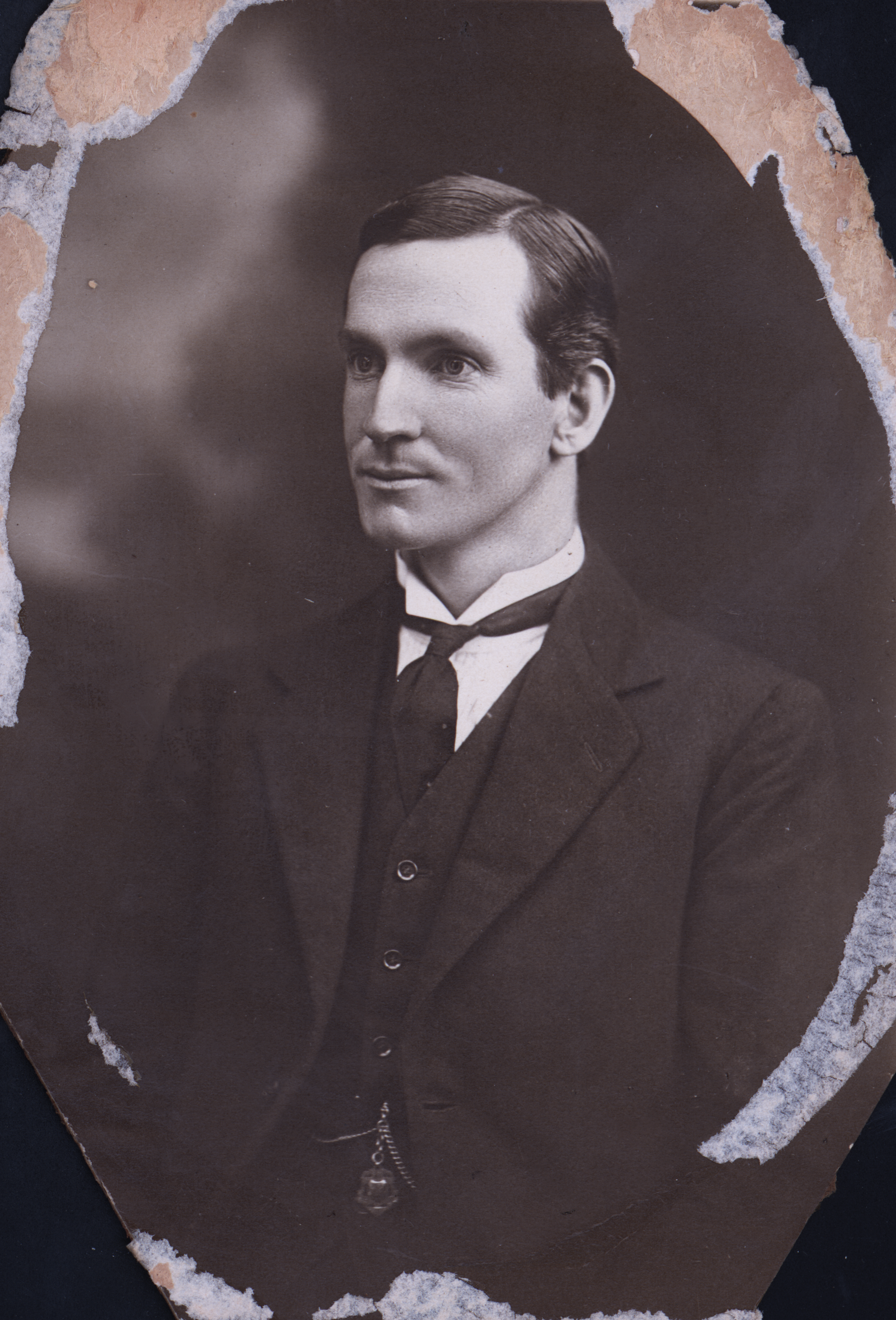
Lawrence Joseph O'Hara

Lawrence Joseph O'Hara (30 April 1889 – 14 June 1919) was an Australian politician.

== Early life ==
He was born at Taradale in New Zealand to labourer John O'Hara and Annie Dolan, both Irish-born. The family moved to Sydney when Lawrence was seven, and he was educated at Marist Brothers' College in Paddington.

== Career ==
He worked as a clerk with the Immigration and Tourist Bureau from 1908 to 1916 and for the District Courts from 1916 to 1919. He was also a member of the Clerks' Union, the Australian Labor Party (serving on the central executive from 1917 to 1919) and a Paddington alderman (1917–19).

In 1919 he was elected to the New South Wales Legislative Assembly in a by-election for the seat of Paddington, but he died twenty-two days later as a result of the influenza pandemic. He is buried in the Waverley Cemetery.

New South Wales Legislative Assembly
Preceded by John Osborne	Member for Paddington; 1919	Succeeded by John Birt
