= Thomas Thrower =

Australian politician (1870–1917)

Thomas Henry Thrower (28 June 1870 – 21 June 1917) was an Australian politician. He was an Australian Labor Party member of the New South Wales Legislative Assembly from 1904 to 1907 and 1910 to 1917, representing the electorate of Macquarie.

== Early life and career ==
Thrower was born in Surry Hills in Sydney and was raised in the Shoalhaven district on the South Coast before returning to Sydney to attend high school. He intended to study law, but due to his family's financial situation instead apprenticed as a furniture and cabinet maker. He joined the Furniture Trades Union, and served as its president for several years. In 1888, while still an apprentice, he was elected as a delegate to the Trades and Labour Council of Sydney and served on its executive and parliamentary committees through the 1890 maritime strike and the 1892 Broken Hill strike. In 1900, when the council reformed as the Sydney Labour Council, he was elected as its president and served until 1902, when the council decided to establish a paid secretary role and appointed Thrower to the position; in this capacity, he represented 77 unions and over 45,000 workers. As a unionist, he was an outspoken opponent of Chinese labour and business, especially in the cabinetmaking and grocery businesses. In 1902, he represented the New South Wales unions at the first Commonwealth Trade Union Congress. He was also a member of the Citizen's Relief (Lord Mayor's) Fund Committee, the union representative on the Commonwealth Celebrations Committee and a long-standing secretary of the Eight Hour Day committee. He was an unsuccessful Labor candidate at the 1903 Tamworth state by-election and the 1903 federal election in East Sydney.

== State politics ==
He was elected to the Legislative Assembly at the 1904 state election for Macquarie, at which time he resigned as Labour Council secretary. However, he was defeated by 65 votes at the 1907 election by Liberal candidate Charles Barton. He then served as secretary of the Dubbo and Gilgandra-based Western Timber Getters Association and its successor the Western Timber Cutters and Carters Association from 1907 to 1910.

Thrower won his old seat back at the 1910 state election at which Barton retired, and was narrowly re-elected in the marginal seat in 1913 and 1917. He was chairman of committees from March 1914 to February 1917 and was well-regarded in the role, as of result of which he had been touted as a potential future Speaker. As the local MP, he was largely responsible for the substantial extension of the Dubbo Hospital, improvements to the Dubbo Public School and the establishment of the Dubbo High School and was a strong advocate for the construction of the Molong–Dubbo railway line. He became ill in September 1916 with what was described as Bright's disease, spending long periods in hospital and physically struggling during the 1917 election campaign. He died at Redfern in June 1917 aged only 47, only three months after his re-election. He was buried in the Roman Catholic section of the Waverley Cemetery.

He married Catherine Newman around 1900, and they had five children.

New South Wales Legislative Assembly
Preceded by William Hurley	Member for Macquarie; 1904–1907	Succeeded by Charles Barton
Preceded by Charles Barton	Member for Macquarie; 1910–1917	Succeeded by Patrick McGirr
