= Electoral district of Macquarie =

Former state electoral district of New South Wales, Australia

Macquarie, until 1910 The Macquarie was an electoral district of the Legislative Assembly in the Australian state of New South Wales, created in 1894 and named after the Macquarie River. It was re-created in 1904, retaining nothing but the name, then abolished in 1920.

The district created in 1894 was at the upper reaches of the Macquarie River, from Oberon to Sofala, and was divided between Bathurst Blayney and Hartley. There was a significant re-distribution of electorates in 1904 as a result of the 1903 New South Wales referendum, which required the number of members of the Legislative Assembly to be reduced from 125 to 90. The member for The Macquarie from 1895 to 1904 was William Hurley (Progressive) who did not contest the 1904 election as he was appointed to the Legislative Council.

The district re-created in 1904 consisted of parts of the abolished seats of Dubbo and Wellington. The member for Dubbo was Simeon Phillips (Liberal Reform) unsuccessfully contested the election for The Macquarie. The member for Wellington was John Haynes (Liberal Reform) who unsuccessfully contested the election for Mudgee.

== Members for Macquarie ==
Member	Party	Period
James Tonkin	Free Trade	1894–1895
William Hurley	Protectionist	1895–1901
William Hurley	Progressive	1901–1904
Thomas Thrower	Labour	1904–1907
Charles Barton	Liberal Reform	1907–1910
Thomas Thrower	Labor	1910–1917
Patrick McGirr	Labor	1917–1920

== Election results ==
1917 Macquarie by-election Saturday 28 July
Party	Candidate	Votes	%	±%
Labor	Patrick McGirr	3,521	50.8	−0.1
Nationalist	Murdock McLeod	3,232	46.6	−2.6
Australian Producers Co-Operative Party	Frank Foster	182	2.6	
Total formal votes		6,935	99.5	+0.5
Informal votes		34	0.5	−0.5
Turnout		6,969	65.1 (Note: based on an electoral roll of 10,704 at the 1917 state election.)	−7.3
Labor hold		Swing	N/A	

Thomas Thrower (Labor) died.
