= Electoral district of King (New South Wales) =

Former state electoral district of New South Wales, Australia

King was an electoral district in the Australian state of New South Wales. It was created in 1904 as a result of the 1903 New South Wales referendum, which required the number of members of the Legislative Assembly to be reduced from 125 to 90. It largely replaced Sydney-King, losing a part to Darling Harbour. It was expanded to include parts of Sydney-Fitzroy and Sydney-Bligh. It also included Lord Howe Island, Montague Island and South Solitary Island.

In 1920 NSW introduced proportional representation and the district was absorbed into the multi-member electorate of Sydney. NSW returned to single member electorates in 1927 and King was recreated. It was abolished in 1973 and absorbed into the neighbouring electorates of Phillip, Balmain and Marrickville.

== Members for King ==
First incarnation (1904–1920)
Member	Party	Term
Ernest Broughton	Liberal Reform	1904–1910
James Morrish	Labor	1910–1917
James Morrish	Nationalist	1917
Tom Smith	Labor	1917–1920
Second incarnation (1927–1973)
Member	Party	Term
Daniel Clyne	Labor	1927–1932
Daniel Clyne	Labor (NSW)	1932–1938
Daniel Clyne	Labor	1938–1956
Albert Sloss	Labor	1956–1973

== Election results ==
1971 New South Wales state election: King
Party	Candidate	Votes	%	±%
Labor	Albert Sloss	16,918	71.2	+4.0
Liberal	Andrew Bush	4,628	19.5	−0.4
Communist	Doris Jobling	1,146	4.8	−4.3
Independent	Ernest Williams	1,060	4.5	+4.5
Total formal votes		23,752	94.1	
Informal votes		1,478	5.9	
Turnout		25,230	88.7	
Two-party-preferred result
Labor	Albert Sloss	18,408	77.5	+1.1
Liberal	Andrew Bush	5,344	22.5	−1.1
Labor hold		Swing	+1.1	
