= Claude Bushell =

Australian politician (1873–1930)

Claude Hilton Bushell (25 June 1873 – 6 December 1930) was an Australian politician.

He was born in Wilberforce to farmer David Bushell and Izeppa Winton. He attended Richmond Public School and became a commercial traveller. He was then a storekeeper first at Cobar and then at Mandurama. Around 1900 he married Mary Pellett at Muswellbrook; they had four daughters. In 1917 he was elected to the New South Wales Legislative Assembly as the Labor member for Lyndhurst, but he retired in 1920. Around 1928 he married his second wife, Janet Baker. He died in Parkes in 1930.

New South Wales Legislative Assembly
| Preceded by Thomas Waddell | Member for Lyndhurst; 1917–1920 | Abolished |
