= Tom Smith (Australian politician) =

Irish-born Australian politician

Thomas Januarius Smith (13 January 1890 – 23 September 1975) was an Irish-born Australian politician.

He was born in Dublin; his father was James William Smith. He was educated at St Francis Xavier's College, Liverpool, before becoming a clothing salesman. On arrival in New South Wales he became involved with the trade union movement, working as an organiser for the Australian Workers' Union. He was elected to the New South Wales Legislative Assembly in 1917 as the Labor member for King, but with the introduction of proportional representation in 1920 he was defeated running for the multi-member seat of Sydney. He remained involved with the Labor Party, serving on the central executive from 1921 to 1922 and being appointed to the New South Wales Legislative Council in 1921, serving until the council's reconstitution in 1934. He had two children from his first marriage to Grace Mary Lewis, which had taken place on 20 June 1917; his second marriage, on 30 April 1943, was to Alice Adela Louise. Smith died in Manly in 1975.

New South Wales Legislative Assembly
Preceded by James Morrish	Member for King; 1917–1920	Abolished
