= 1917 New South Wales state election =

Election of the 24th New South Wales Legislative Assembly

- 24 March 1917

All 90 seats in the New South Wales Legislative Assembly 46 Assembly seats were needed for a majority
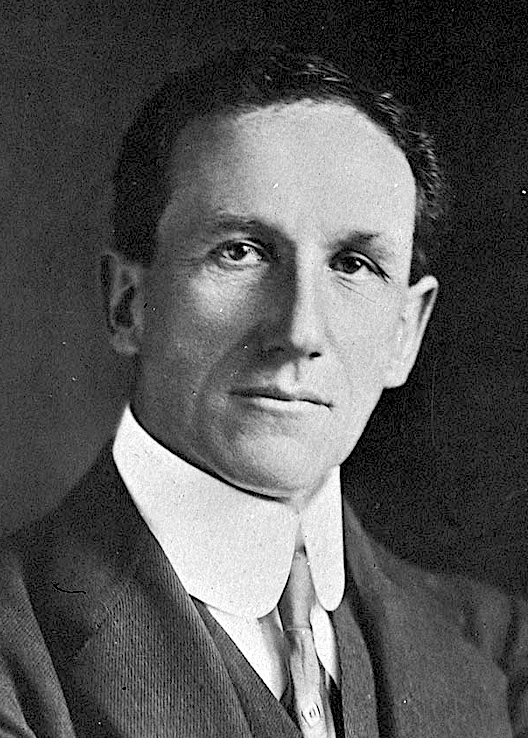

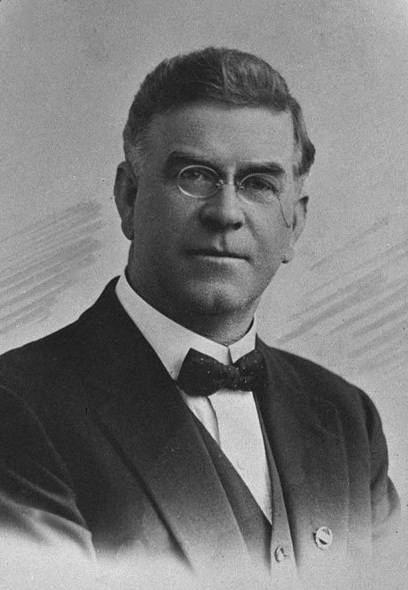
	First party	Second party
Leader	William Holman	John Storey
Party	Nationalist	Labor
Leader since	15 November 1916	February 1917
Leader's seat	Cootamundra	Balmain
Last election	39 seats	49 seats
Seats won	52	33
Seat change	▲13	▼16
Popular vote	292,306	262,655
Percentage	47.44%	43.63%
Swing	▲1.17	▼4.00
- Legislative Assembly after the election
Premier before election
William Holman
Nationalist
Subsequent Premier
William Holman
Nationalist

The 1917 New South Wales state election was held on 24 March 1917. This election was for all of the 90 seats in the 24th New South Wales Legislative Assembly and it was conducted in single-member constituencies with a second ballot if a majority was not achieved on the first. The 23rd parliament of New South Wales was dissolved on 21 February 1917 by the governor, Sir Gerald Strickland, on the advice of the premier William Holman.

Since the previous election, Premier Holman had left the Labor Party with 17 of his supporters and entered into a coalition with the opposition Liberal Party, as a result of the 1916 conscription dispute that split the Labor Party nationally. In early 1917, Holman's supporters merged with the Liberals to form the New South Wales branch of the Nationalist Party. Although the merged party was dominated by former Liberals, Holman became its leader, and thus remained premier.

The Nationalists won a sweeping victory, scoring a 13-seat swing which was magnified by the large number of former Labor MPs who followed Holman out of the party. It thus presaged the federal Nationalists' equally comprehensive victory in the federal election two months later.

== Key dates ==
Date	Event
21 February 1917	The Legislative Assembly was dissolved, and writs were issued by the governor to proceed with an election.
3 March 1917	Nominations for candidates for the election closed at noon.
24 March 1917	Polling day.
17 April 1917	Opening of 24th Parliament.

== Results ==
1917 New South Wales state election Legislative Assembly << 1913–1920 >>
Enrolled voters	1,109,830				
Votes cast	616,146		Turnout	61.43	-6.81
Informal votes	6,332		Informal	1.02	–1.28
Summary of votes by party
Party	Primary votes	%	Swing	Seats	Change
Nationalist (Note: Compared to the combined vote of Liberal Reform, Farmers and Settlers and Country Party Association at the 1913 election.)	292,306	47.44	+1.17	52	+13
Labor	262,655	42.63	−4.00	33	−16
Independent	25,528	4.14	+1.86	3	+2
Independent Labor	20,085	3.26	+1.88	1	0
Ind. Nationalist	15,201	2.47	+0.03	1	+1
Ind. Socialist Labor	371	0.06	–0.19	0	0
Total	616,146			90	

Popular vote
Nationalist	47.44%
Labor	42.63%
Independent	4.14%
Ind. Labor	3.26%
Ind. Nationalist	2.47%
Others	0.06%
Parliamentary seats
Nationalist	52
Labor	33
Independent	3
Ind. Labor	1
Ind. Nationalist	1

== Retiring members ==
=== Labor ===
- Ernest Durack MLA (Bathurst)

=== Nationalist ===
- Henry Hoyle MLA (Surry Hills) — elected as Labor
- James Mercer (Rozelle) — elected as Labor
- Charles Wade MLA (Gordon)

== See also ==
- Candidates of the 1917 New South Wales state election
- Members of the New South Wales Legislative Assembly, 1917–1920
