= Industrial Socialist Labor Party =

- President: Arthur Rae
- Secretary: Albert Willis
- Founded: 1919
- Dissolved: 1920s
- Ideology: Socialism
- Political position: Far-left

The Industrial Socialist Labor Party, Industrial Labor Party and the Independent Labor Party were short lived socialist political parties in Australia in 1919 and the early 1920s. The Industrial Socialist Labor Party was founded by radical socialist members of the industrial wing of the Australian Labor Party (ALP), at a time when the ALP's socialist ideology was a matter of intra-party dispute. It was closely aligned with the Industrial Workers of the World (IWW) and the One Big Union (OBE) movement.

The party was formally founded at a conference in August 1919, with Arthur Rae becoming Secretary and Albert Willis President of the party. The party subsequently announced that George Burns and William McCristal would nominate for the seats of Illawarra and Cook in the 1919 Australian federal election. They were opposed by endorsed ALP candidates and received less than 10% of the primary vote.

In January 1920, the party merged with the Socialist Labor Party, taking the name of the Socialist Labor Party. In February 1921, the parliamentarian Percy Brookfield and several other members split from the Socialist Labor Party and formed the Industrial Labor Party, citing they were "dissatisfied with the manner in which the affairs of that party have been carried on".

Michael Considine, Labor member for Barrier in the federal House of Representatives from 1917, joined in 1920 after his expulsion from the ALP, and unsuccessfully contested the seat of Darling for the Industrial Labor Party in 1922. Donald Grant, one of 12 Australian IWW members gaoled in 1916, contested the New South Wales Legislative Assembly seat of Sturt at the 1922 state election but received only 7.88% of the primary vote. He later became a member of parliament for the Labor Party. Other members of the party who later became prominent in the ALP were Jock Garden and Jack Baddeley.

== See also ==
- Socialism in Australia
