= John Osborne (Australian politician) =

Politician and union official from New South Wales, Australia

John Percy Osborne (1 December 1878 – 19 February 1961) was an Australian politician.

He was born in Deniliquin to mining engineer Alfred John Osborne and schoolteacher Jane McCoy. He left school at fourteen to work at a mine smelters at Captains Flat, before moving to Sydney in 1902 to work as a shop assistant. He was a founding member of the Shop Assistants' Union, serving as secretary from 1902 to 1907 and later as president. In 1906, he married Julia Rosenfeld, with whom he had three children. In 1910 he was elected to the New South Wales Legislative Assembly as the Labor member for Paddington, serving until the Nationalist government of William Holman appointed him to the Meat Board in 1919. The board was responsible for the control and maintenance of abattoirs, cattle sale yards, meat markets, and slaughterhouses in the greater Sydney region. H. V. Evatt described the appointment as intended to deprive Labor of one of its better political organisers ahead of the 1920 election.

Osborne died at Roseville on 19 February 1961 (aged 82).

New South Wales Legislative Assembly
Preceded by Charles Oakes	Member for Paddington; 1910–1919	Succeeded by Lawrence O'Hara
