= Electoral results for the district of Durham =

Election result for Durham, New South Wales, Australia

Durham, an electoral district of the Legislative Assembly in the Australian state of New South Wales, was created in 1856 and abolished in 1859. It was recreated in 1880 and abolished in 1920.

Election	Member	Party	Member	Party	Member	Party
1856	Richard Jones	None	William Arnold	None	Samuel Gordon	None
1858	Richard Jones	None	William Arnold	None	Samuel Gordon	None
Election	Member	Party				
1880	Herbert Brown	None				
1882	Herbert Brown	None				
1885	Herbert Brown	None				
1887	Herbert Brown	Free Trade				
1889	Herbert Brown	Free Trade				
1891	Herbert Brown	Free Trade				
1894	Herbert Brown	Ind. Free Trade				
1895	Herbert Brown	Protectionist				
1898	Walter Bennett	Ind. Protectionist				
1901	Walter Bennett	Progressive				
1904	Walter Bennett	Progressive				
1907	William Brown	Independent Liberal				
1910	William Brown	Liberal Reform				
1913	William Brown	Liberal Reform				
1917	Walter Bennett	Independent				

== Election results ==
=== Elections in the 1910s ===
==== 1917 ====
1917 New South Wales state election: Durham
Party	Candidate	Votes	%	±%
Nationalist	William Brown	2,767	45.0	−5.4
Independent	Walter Bennett	1,872	30.5	−11.8
Labor	Walter O'Hearn	1,029	16.8	+9.5
Independent	Daniel Ferry	475	7.7	+7.7
Total formal votes		6,143	98.7	+0.9
Informal votes		78	1.3	−0.9
Turnout		6,221	65.9	−8.0

1917 New South Wales state election: Durham - Second Round
Party	Candidate	Votes	%	±%
Independent	Walter Bennett	3,021	50.1	
Nationalist	William Brown	3,005	49.9	
Total formal votes		6,026	99.4	+0.7
Informal votes		39	0.6	−0.7
Turnout		6,065	64.3	−1.6
Independent gain from Nationalist				

==== 1913 ====
1913 New South Wales state election: Durham
Party	Candidate	Votes	%	±%
Farmers and Settlers	William Brown (Note: Also endorsed by Liberal Reform.)	3,509	50.4	
Country Party Association	Walter Bennett	2,944	42.3	
Labor	William Walton	505	7.3	
Total formal votes		6,958	97.8	
Informal votes		158	2.2	
Turnout		7,116	73.9	
Member changed to Farmers and Settlers from Liberal Reform				

==== 1910 ====
1910 New South Wales state election: Durham
Party	Candidate	Votes	%	±%
Liberal Reform	William Brown	2,726	48.3	−2.3
Independent Liberal	Walter Bennett	2,155	38.2	−11.2
Labour	Robert Elkin	763	13.5	
Total formal votes		5,644	98.2	+0.6
Informal votes		106	1.8	−0.6
Turnout		7,750	71.4	+2.9

1910 New South Wales state election: Durham - Second Round
Party	Candidate	Votes	%	±%
Liberal Reform	William Brown	3,169	50.5	−0.1
Independent Liberal	Walter Bennett	3,106	49.5	+0.1
Total formal votes		6,275	99.0	+1.4
Informal votes		64	1.0	−1.4
Turnout		6,339	78.7	+10.2
Member changed to Liberal Reform from Independent Liberal				

=== Elections in the 1900s ===
==== 1907 ====
1907 New South Wales state election: Durham
Party	Candidate	Votes	%	±%
Independent Liberal	William Brown	2,221	50.6	
Former Progressive	Walter Bennett (defeated)	2,166	49.4	
Total formal votes		4,387	97.6	
Informal votes		108	2.4	
Turnout		4,495	68.5	
Independent Liberal gain from Progressive (Note: William Brown had the support of some local Liberal Reform branches but was not endorsed by the central executive. The Sydney Morning Herald said both candidates were generally favourable to the Government policy.)				

==== 1904 ====
1904 New South Wales state election: Durham
Party	Candidate	Votes	%	±%
Progressive	Walter Bennett	2,196	46.4	
Liberal Reform	Herbert Brown	1,617	34.2	
Independent	William Brown	919	19.4	
Independent Liberal	Richard Price	3	0.1	
Total formal votes		4,735	98.9	
Informal votes		51	1.1	
Turnout		4,786	69.1	
Progressive hold				

Durham was expanded to include part of Gloucester. The member for Durham was Walter Bennett (Progressive). The member for Gloucester was Richard Price (Independent) who nominated to contest Durham however he withdrew from the contest.

==== 1901 ====
1901 New South Wales state election: Durham
Party	Candidate	Votes	%	±%
Progressive	Walter Bennett	unopposed		
Member changed to Progressive from Ind. Progressive				

=== Elections in the 1890s ===
==== 1898 ====
1898 New South Wales colonial election: Durham
Party	Candidate	Votes	%	±%
Independent Federalist	Walter Bennett	929	53.1	
National Federal	Herbert Brown	820	46.9	
Total formal votes		1,749	98.8	
Informal votes		21	1.2	
Turnout		1,770	76.6	
Independent Federalist gain from National Federal				

==== 1895 ====
1895 New South Wales colonial election: Durham
Party	Candidate	Votes	%	±%
Protectionist	Herbert Brown	781	77.6	
Ind. Protectionist	Erskine Smith	226	22.4	
Total formal votes		1,007	99.2	
Informal votes		8	0.8	
Turnout		1,015	48.1	
Member changed to Protectionist from Ind. Free Trade				

==== 1894 ====
1894 New South Wales colonial election: Durham
Party	Candidate	Votes	%	±%
Ind. Free Trade	Herbert Brown	962	59.7	
Ind. Protectionist	John Wade	607	37.7	
Ind. Protectionist	Charles Duffy	42	2.6	
Total formal votes		1,611	98.2	
Informal votes		30	1.8	
Turnout		1,641	76.8	
Member changed to Ind. Free Trade from Free Trade				

==== 1891 ====
1891 New South Wales colonial election: Durham Saturday 27 June
Party	Candidate	Votes	%	±%
Free Trade	Herbert Brown (re-elected)	662	56.3	
Protectionist	William Donnelly	289	24.6	
Protectionist	James Boydell	224	19.1	
Total formal votes		1,175	97.8	
Informal votes		26	2.2	
Turnout		1,201	68.6	
Free Trade hold				

=== Elections in the 1880s ===
==== 1889 ====
1889 New South Wales colonial election: Durham Saturday 16 February
Party	Candidate	Votes	%	±%
Free Trade	Herbert Brown (elected)	626	56.5	
Protectionist	John Wade	482	43.5	
Total formal votes		1,108	97.5	
Informal votes		29	2.6	
Turnout		1,137	72.1	
Free Trade hold				

==== 1887 ====
1887 New South Wales colonial election: Durham Saturday 26 February
Party	Candidate	Votes	%	±%
Free Trade	Herbert Brown (re-elected)	591	57.9	
Ind. Free Trade	John Wade	429	42.1	
Total formal votes		1,020	97.1	
Informal votes		30	2.9	
Turnout		1,050	70.4	

==== 1885 ====
1885 New South Wales colonial election: Durham Monday 26 October
Candidate	Votes	%
Herbert Brown (re-elected)	737	72.6
William Johnston	278	27.4
Total formal votes	1,015	97.9
Informal votes	22	2.1
Turnout	1,037	72.4

==== 1882 ====
1882 New South Wales colonial election: Durham Monday 4 December
Candidate	Votes	%
Herbert Brown (re-elected)	unopposed	

==== 1880 ====
1880 New South Wales colonial election: Durham Monday 22 November
Candidate	Votes	%
Herbert Brown (re-elected)	660	63.2
William Johnston (defeated)	385	36.8
Total formal votes	1,045	98.5
Informal votes	16	1.5
Turnout	1,061	72.1
	(new seat)	

Durham replaced all of the abolished district of The Paterson and part of the abolished district of The Williams. Herbert Brown was the member for The Paterson and William Johnston was the member for The Williams.

District re-created

==== 1859 - 1880 ====
District abolished

=== Elections in the 1850s ===
==== 1858 ====
1858 New South Wales colonial election: Durham 5 February
Candidate	Votes	%
Samuel Gordon (re-elected 1)	416	33.0
William Arnold (re-elected 2)	408	32.4
Richard Jones (re-elected 3)	355	28.2
Edward Hargraves	79	6.3
Total formal votes	1,258	100.0
Informal votes	0	0.0
Turnout	1,258	28.8

==== 1856 ====
1856 New South Wales colonial election: Durham
Candidate	Votes	%
Richard Jones (elected 1)	660	30.7
Samuel Gordon (elected 2)	550	25.6
William Arnold (elected 3)	380	17.7
Andrew Lang	349	16.3
Alexander Park	209	9.7
Total formal votes	2,148	100.0
Informal votes	0	0.0
Turnout	842	58.51

Polling was conducted on 7 April 1856. Park had represented County of Durham in the old Legislative Council, while another representative in Charles Cowper contested Sydney City.
