= Electoral results for the district of Tenterfield =

Election results for Tenterfield, New South Wales, Australia

Tenterfield, an electoral district of the Legislative Assembly in the Australian state of New South Wales, had two incarnations, from 1859 to 1920 and from 1927 to 1981.

Election	Member	Party
1859	Randolph Nott	None
1860	Robert Meston	None
1861 by	Hugh Gordon	None
1864	Hugh Gordon	None
1869	Colin Fraser	None
1872	Robert Abbott	None
1874 by	Robert Abbott	None
1874	Robert Abbott	None
1877	John Dillon	None
1880	John Dillon	None
1882 by	Augustus Fraser	None
1882	Sir Henry Parkes	None
1884 by	Charles Lee	None
1885	Charles Lee	None
1887	Charles Lee	Free Trade
1889	Charles Lee	Free Trade
1891	Charles Lee	Free Trade
1894	Charles Lee	Free Trade
1895	Charles Lee	Free Trade
1898	Charles Lee	Free Trade
1901	Charles Lee	Liberal Reform
1904	Charles Lee	Liberal Reform
1904 by	Charles Lee	Liberal Reform
1907	Charles Lee	Liberal Reform
1910	Charles Lee	Liberal Reform
1913	Charles Lee	Liberal Reform
1917	Charles Lee	Nationalist
Election	Member	Party
1927	Michael Bruxner	Country
1930	Michael Bruxner	Country
1932	Michael Bruxner	Country
1935	Michael Bruxner	Country
1938	Michael Bruxner	Country
1941	Michael Bruxner	Country
1944	Michael Bruxner	Country
1947	Michael Bruxner	Country
1950	Michael Bruxner	Country
1953	Michael Bruxner	Country
1956	Michael Bruxner	Country
1959	Michael Bruxner	Country
1962	Tim Bruxner	Country
1965	Tim Bruxner	Country
1968	Tim Bruxner	Country
1971	Tim Bruxner	Country
1973	Tim Bruxner	Country
1976	Tim Bruxner	Country
1978	Tim Bruxner	National Country

== Election results ==
=== Elections in the 1970s ===
==== 1978 ====
1978 New South Wales state election: Tenterfield
Party	Candidate	Votes	%	±%
National Country	Tim Bruxner	11,819	59.4	−6.6
Labor	Jim Curran	8,093	40.6	+6.6
Total formal votes		19,912	98.6	−0.2
Informal votes		274	1.4	+0.2
Turnout		20,186	93.4	−0.2
National Country hold		Swing	−6.6	

==== 1976 ====
1976 New South Wales state election: Tenterfield
Party	Candidate	Votes	%	±%
Country	Tim Bruxner	12,979	66.0	−2.6
Labor	Joseph Hughes	6,681	34.0	+2.6
Total formal votes		19,660	98.8	0.0
Informal votes		231	1.2	0.0
Turnout		19,891	93.6	+1.9
Country hold		Swing	−2.6	

==== 1973 ====
1973 New South Wales state election: Tenterfield
Party	Candidate	Votes	%	±%
Country	Tim Bruxner	13,005	68.6	+12.1
Labor	Alice Clifford	5,944	31.4	−7.8
Total formal votes		18,949	98.8	
Informal votes		234	1.2	
Turnout		19,183	91.7	
Country hold		Swing	+9.9	

==== 1971 ====
1971 New South Wales state election: Tenterfield
Party	Candidate	Votes	%	±%
Country	Tim Bruxner	9,683	56.5	−10.4
Labor	Ronald Grafton	6,706	39.2	+6.1
Independent	George Britz	736	4.3	+4.3
Total formal votes		17,125	99.0	
Informal votes		169	1.0	
Turnout		17,294	93.3	
Two-party-preferred result
Country	Tim Bruxner	10,051	58.7	−8.2
Labor	Ronald Grafton	7,074	41.3	+8.2
Country hold		Swing	−8.2	

=== Elections in the 1960s ===
==== 1968 ====
1968 New South Wales state election: Tenterfield
Party	Candidate	Votes	%	±%
Country	Tim Bruxner	11,380	66.9	+9.8
Labor	Ronald Grafton	5,622	33.1	−9.8
Total formal votes		17,002	98.8	
Informal votes		211	1.2	
Turnout		17,213	94.4	
Country hold		Swing	+9.8	

==== 1965 ====
1965 New South Wales state election: Tenterfield
Party	Candidate	Votes	%	±%
Country	Tim Bruxner	10,119	57.1	+6.4
Labor	Eric Potter	7,614	42.9	−6.4
Total formal votes		17,733	98.9	−0.3
Informal votes		203	1.1	+0.3
Turnout		17,936	94.9	+0.6
Country hold		Swing	+6.4	

==== 1962 ====
1962 New South Wales state election: Tenterfield
Party	Candidate	Votes	%	±%
Country	Tim Bruxner	8,940	50.7	−17.3
Labor	Eric Potter	8,675	49.3	+17.3
Total formal votes		17,615	99.2	
Informal votes		147	0.8	
Turnout		17,762	94.3	
Country hold		Swing	−17.3	

=== Elections in the 1950s ===
==== 1959 ====
1959 New South Wales state election: Tenterfield
Party	Candidate	Votes	%	±%
Country	Michael Bruxner	9,280	68.1	
Labor	Herbert Pottie	4,352	31.9	
Total formal votes		13,632	98.9	
Informal votes		156	1.1	
Turnout		13,788	91.9	
Country hold		Swing		

==== 1956 ====
1956 New South Wales state election: Tenterfield
Party	Candidate	Votes	%	±%
Country	Michael Bruxner	unopposed		
Country hold				

==== 1953 ====
1953 New South Wales state election: Tenterfield
Party	Candidate	Votes	%	±%
Country	Michael Bruxner	8,585	60.1	
Labor	Frederick Cowley	5,688	39.9	
Total formal votes		14,273	98.6	
Informal votes		201	1.4	
Turnout		14,474	93.8	
Country hold		Swing		

==== 1950 ====
1950 New South Wales state election: Tenterfield
Party	Candidate	Votes	%	±%
Country	Michael Bruxner	9,669	60.0	
Independent Country	Ben Wade	6,445	40.0	
Total formal votes		16,114	96.4	
Informal votes		600	3.6	
Turnout		16,714	92.1	
Country hold		Swing		

=== Elections in the 1940s ===
==== 1947 ====
1947 New South Wales state election: Tenterfield
Party	Candidate	Votes	%	±%
Country	Michael Bruxner	unopposed		
Country hold				

==== 1944 ====
1944 New South Wales state election: Tenterfield
Party	Candidate	Votes	%	±%
Country	Michael Bruxner	8,613	67.7	+10.8
Independent	Edward Ogilvie	4,103	32.3	+32.3
Total formal votes		12,716	97.5	−0.7
Informal votes		329	2.5	+0.7
Turnout		13,045	87.0	−5.1
Country hold		Swing	N/A	

==== 1941 ====
1941 New South Wales state election: Tenterfield
Party	Candidate	Votes	%	±%
Country	Michael Bruxner	7,797	56.9	
Labor	Edward Ogilvie	5,893	43.1	
Total formal votes		13,690	98.2	
Informal votes		248	1.8	
Turnout		13,938	92.1	
Country hold		Swing		

=== Elections in the 1930s ===
==== 1938 ====
1938 New South Wales state election: Tenterfield
Party	Candidate	Votes	%	±%
Country	Michael Bruxner	7,995	61.9	−38.1
Independent	William McCotter	2,968	23.0	+23.0
Independent	Edward Ogilvie	1,959	15.2	+15.2
Total formal votes		12,922	98.2	
Informal votes		242	1.8	
Turnout		13,164	94.4	
Country hold		Swing	N/A	

- Preferences were not distributed.

==== 1935 ====
1935 New South Wales state election: Tenterfield
Party	Candidate	Votes	%	±%
Country	Michael Bruxner	unopposed		
Country hold				

==== 1932 ====
1932 New South Wales state election: Tenterfield
Party	Candidate	Votes	%	±%
Country	Michael Bruxner	unopposed		
Country hold				

==== 1930 ====
1930 New South Wales state election: Tenterfield
Party	Candidate	Votes	%	±%
Country	Michael Bruxner	7,161	59.3	
Labor	Alfred Cameron	4,908	40.7	
Total formal votes		12,069	98.7	
Informal votes		161	1.3	
Turnout		12,230	96.4	
Country hold		Swing		

=== Elections in the 1920s ===
==== 1927 ====
1927 New South Wales state election: Tenterfield
Party	Candidate	Votes	%	±%
Country	Michael Bruxner	unopposed		
Country win		(new seat)		

District recreated

==== 1920 - 1927 ====
District abolished

=== Elections in the 1910s ===
==== 1917 ====
1917 New South Wales state election: Tenterfield
Party	Candidate	Votes	%	±%
Nationalist	Charles Lee	4,090	70.7	
Labor	William Sturgess	1,691	29.3	
Total formal votes		5,781	99.1	
Informal votes		50	0.9	
Turnout		5,831	54.3	
Nationalist hold				

==== 1913 ====
1913 New South Wales state election: Tenterfield
Party	Candidate	Votes	%	±%
Liberal Reform	Charles Lee	unopposed		
Liberal Reform hold				

==== 1910 ====
1910 New South Wales state election: Tenterfield
Party	Candidate	Votes	%	±%
Liberal Reform	Charles Lee	4,495	59.4	
Labour	Reginald Whereat	2,226	29.4	
Independent	Robert Pyers	849	11.2	
Total formal votes		7,570	97.9	
Informal votes		162	2.1	
Turnout		7,732	67.4	
Liberal Reform hold				

=== Elections in the 1900s ===
==== 1907 ====
1907 New South Wales state election: Tenterfield
Party	Candidate	Votes	%	±%
Liberal Reform	Charles Lee	3,111	53.1	
Independent	Robert Pyers	2,753	47.0	
Total formal votes		5,864	97.0	
Informal votes		182	3.0	
Turnout		6,046	66.6	
Liberal Reform hold				

==== 1904 by-election ====
1904 Tenterfield by-election Wednesday 14 September
Party	Candidate	Votes	%	±%
Liberal Reform	Charles Lee (re-elected)	2,470	61.7	+5.4
Progressive	Robert Pyers	1,536	38.3	−5.4
Total formal votes		4,006	100.0	+0.7
Informal votes		0	0.0	−0.7
Turnout		4,006	59.6 (Note: estimate based on an electoral roll of 6,724 at the August 1904 election.)	−0.1
Liberal Reform hold		Swing	+5.4	

Charles Lee was appointed Secretary for Public Works in the Carruthers ministry.

==== 1904 ====
1904 New South Wales state election: Tenterfield
Party	Candidate	Votes	%	±%
Liberal Reform	Charles Lee	2,247	56.3	
Progressive	Robert Pyers	1,742	43.7	
Total formal votes		3,989	99.3	
Informal votes		27	0.7	
Turnout		4,016	59.7	
Liberal Reform hold				

Tenterfield was expanded to include part of The Richmond. Charles Lee (Liberal Reform) was the member for Tenterfield while Robert Pyers (Progressive) was the member for The Richmond.

==== 1901 ====
1901 New South Wales state election: Tenterfield
Party	Candidate	Votes	%	±%
Liberal Reform	Charles Lee	unopposed		
Liberal Reform hold				

=== Elections in the 1890s ===
==== 1898 ====
1898 New South Wales colonial election: Tenterfield
Party	Candidate	Votes	%	±%
Free Trade	Charles Lee	704	53.1	
National Federal	John Reid	622	46.9	
Total formal votes		1,326	98.7	
Informal votes		17	1.3	
Turnout		1,343	74.0	
Free Trade hold				

==== 1895 ====
1895 New South Wales colonial election: Tenterfield
Party	Candidate	Votes	%	±%
Free Trade	Charles Lee	805	67.6	
Protectionist	John Coxall	386	32.4	
Total formal votes		1,191	99.8	
Informal votes		3	0.3	
Turnout		1,194	69.5	
Free Trade hold				

==== 1894 ====
1894 New South Wales colonial election: Tenterfield
Party	Candidate	Votes	%	±%
Free Trade	Charles Lee	729	51.9	
Labour	John Coxall	660	47.0	
Protectionist	Henry Campbell	16	1.1	
Total formal votes		1,405	98.3	
Informal votes		25	1.8	
Turnout		1,430	82.2	
Free Trade hold				

==== 1891 ====
1891 New South Wales colonial election: Tenterfield Tuesday 16 June
Party	Candidate	Votes	%	±%
Free Trade	Charles Lee (elected)	unopposed		
Free Trade hold				

=== Elections in the 1880s ===
==== 1889 ====
1889 New South Wales colonial election: Tenterfield Saturday 16 February
Party	Candidate	Votes	%	±%
Free Trade	Charles Lee (elected)	692	53.3	
Protectionist	Richard Stuart	606	46.7	
Total formal votes		1,298	98.2	
Informal votes		24	1.8	
Turnout		1,322	52.9	
Free Trade hold				

==== 1887 ====
1887 New South Wales colonial election: Tenterfield Monday 21 February
Party	Candidate	Votes	%	±%
Free Trade	Charles Lee (re-elected)	672	65.8	
Protectionist	William Richardson	350	34.3	
Total formal votes		1,022	97.4	
Informal votes		27	2.6	
Turnout		1,049	45.1	

==== 1885 ====
1885 New South Wales colonial election: Tenterfield Friday 30 October
Candidate	Votes	%
Charles Lee (re-elected)	unopposed	

==== 1884 by-election ====
1884 Tenterfield by-election Monday 20 November
Candidate	Votes	%
Charles Lee (elected)	unopposed	

Sir Henry Parkes resigned.

==== 1882 ====
1882 New South Wales colonial election: Tenterfield Friday 8 December
Candidate	Votes	%
Sir Henry Parkes (elected)	unopposed	

Sir Henry Parkes unsuccessfully contested East Sydney and nominated for both St Leonards and then Tenterfield. Parkes then withdrew from St Leonards.

==== 1882 by-election ====
1882 Tenterfield by-election Tuesday 10 January
Candidate	Votes	%
Augustus Fraser (elected)	674	53.7
Edward Bennett	580	46.3
Total formal votes	1,254	97.2
Informal votes	36	2.8
Turnout	1,290	68.2

John Dillon resigned.

==== 1880 ====
1880 New South Wales colonial election: Tenterfield Monday 22 November
Candidate	Votes	%
John Dillon (re-elected)	381	70.0
William Christie	163	30.0
Total formal votes	544	96.5
Informal votes	20	3.6
Turnout	564	40.0

=== Elections in the 1870s ===
==== 1877 ====
1877 New South Wales colonial election: Tenterfield Saturday 3 November
Candidate	Votes	%
John Dillon (elected)	642	40.9
Robert Abbott (defeated)	518	33.0
Alexander Murray	410	26.1
Total formal votes	1,570	97.3
Informal votes	44	2.7
Turnout	1,614	38.3

==== 1874 ====
1874–75 New South Wales colonial election: Tenterfield Tuesday 29 December 1874
Candidate	Votes	%
Robert Abbott (re-elected)	999	58.8
Colin Fraser	624	36.7
W Bourke	77	4.5
Total formal votes	1,700	94.8
Informal votes	93	5.2
Turnout	1,793	49.6

==== 1874 by-election ====
1874 Tenterfield by-election Monday 24 August
Candidate	Votes	%
Robert Abbott (re-elected)	658	74.7
Edward Jones	223	25.3
Total formal votes	881	100.0
Informal votes	0	0.0
Turnout	881	24.4

Robert Abbott was appointed Secretary for Mines in the first Parkes ministry.

==== 1872 ====
1872 New South Wales colonial election: Tenterfield Tuesday 12 March
Candidate	Votes	%
Robert Abbott (elected)	453	55.6
Colin Fraser (defeated)	362	44.4
Total formal votes	815	100.0
Informal votes	0	0.0
Turnout	827	47.6

=== Elections in the 1860s ===
==== 1869 ====
1869–70 New South Wales colonial election: Tenterfield Thursday 23 December 1869
Candidate	Votes	%
Colin Fraser (elected)	397	43.2
Robert Abbott	308	33.5
James Williamson	215	23.4
Total formal votes	920	100.0
Informal votes	0	0.0
Turnout	920	55.7

==== 1864 ====
1864–65 New South Wales colonial election: Tenterfield Saturday 24 December 1864
Candidate	Votes	%
Hugh Gordon (re-elected)	290	52.6
Peel Raymond	261	47.4
Total formal votes	551	100.0
Informal votes	0	0.0
Turnout	551	58.7

==== 1861 by-election ====
1861 Tenterfield by-election Monday 5 August
Candidate	Votes	%
Hugh Gordon (elected)	128	37.8
Marshall Burdekin	96	28.3
R R C Robertson	91	26.8
R W Vivers	24	7.1
Total formal votes	339	100.0
Informal votes	0	0.0
Turnout	339	52.3

Robert Meston resigned.

==== 1860 ====
1860 New South Wales colonial election: Tenterfield Saturday 15 December
Candidate	Votes	%
Robert Meston (elected)	140	69.3
John Ross	62	30.7
Total formal votes	202	100.0
Informal votes	0	0.0
Turnout	202	43.3

=== Elections in the 1850s ===
==== 1859 ====
1859 New South Wales colonial election: Tenterfield Friday 24 June
Candidate	Votes	%
Randolph Nott (elected)	99	55.3
Robert Meston	80	44.7
Total formal votes	179	100.0
Informal votes	0	0.0
Turnout	179	32.8
