= Electoral results for the district of Williams (New South Wales) =

Election results for Williams, New South Wales, Australia

Williams, an electoral district of the Legislative Assembly in the Australian state of New South Wales was created in 1859 and abolished in 1880.

Election	Member	Party
1859	Stephen Dark	None
1860 by	Alexander Campbell	None
1860	William Allen	None
1864	Marshall Burdekin	None
Jan 1866 by	Frederick Manton	None
Apr 1866 by	John Nowlan	None
1869	John Nowlan	None
1872	John Nowlan	None
1874	William Watson	None
1877 by	William Johnston	None
1877	William Johnston	None

== Election results ==
=== Elections in the 1870s ===
==== 1877 ====
1877 New South Wales colonial election: The Williams Thursday 1 November
Candidate	Votes	%
William Johnston (re-elected)	516	51.0
John Booth (defeated)	495	49.0
Total formal votes	1,011	96.1
Informal votes	41	3.9
Turnout	1,052	70.7

William Johnston had won the seat at the 1877 by-election. John Booth was one of the sitting members for East Macquarie.

==== 1877 by-election ====
1877 The Williams by-election Monday 12 February
Candidate	Votes	%
William Johnston (elected)	526	56.4
John Nowlan	409	43.6
Total formal votes	938	98.4
Informal votes	15	1.6
Turnout	953	68.2

William Watson resigned.

==== 1874 ====
1874–75 New South Wales colonial election: The Williams Thursday 31 December 1874
Candidate	Votes	%
William Watson (elected)	400	51.8
George Stephen	373	48.3
Total formal votes	773	97.6
Informal votes	19	2.4
Turnout	792	59.6

==== 1872 ====
1872 New South Wales colonial election: The Williams Friday 8 March
Candidate	Votes	%
John Nowlan (re-elected)	423	50.4
William Watson	416	49.6
Total formal votes	839	100.0
Informal votes	0	0.0
Turnout	839	64.1

=== Elections in the 1860s ===
==== 1869 ====
1869–70 New South Wales colonial election: The Williams Wednesday 22 December 1869
Candidate	Votes	%
John Nowlan (re-elected)	473	61.0
William Mullen	222	28.7
William Watson	69	8.9
Francis O'Brien	11	1.4
Total formal votes	775	100.0
Informal votes	0	0.0
Turnout	775	64.6

==== April 1866 by-election ====
1866 Williams by-election Thursday 19 April
Candidate	Votes	%
John Nowlan (elected)	375	49.2
Joseph Abbott	205	26.9
Archibald Jacob	182	23.9
Total formal votes	762	100.0
Informal votes	0	0.0
Turnout	762	57.0

The seat of Frederick Manton was declared vacant due to insolvency.

==== January 1866 by-election ====
1866 Williams by-election Monday 22 January
Candidate	Votes	%
Frederick Manton (elected)	366	56.1
Marshall Burdekin (defeated)	260	39.9
Henry Ellis	26	4.0
Joseph Abbott (Note: The New South Wales elections results database lists Joseph Abbott as a candidate. The report of the nominations by the Maitland Mercury says that Abbott withdrew in favour of Frederick Manton to avoid splitting the liberal vote.)	0	0.0
Total formal votes	652	100.0
Informal votes	0	0.0
Turnout	652	57.0

Marshall Burdekin was appointed Colonial Treasurer in the fourth Cowper ministry.

==== 1864 ====
1864–65 New South Wales colonial election: The Williams Thursday 8 December 1864
Candidate	Votes	%
Marshall Burdekin (re-elected)	293	50.3
Frederick Manton	177	30.4
William Allen (defeated)	112	19.2
J West	0	0.0
Total formal votes	582	100.0
Informal votes	0	0.0
Turnout	578	58.1

William Allen was the sitting member. Marshall Burdekin was the sitting member for Liverpool Plains

==== 1860 ====
1860 New South Wales colonial election: The Williams Friday 14 December
Candidate	Votes	%
William Allen (elected)	unopposed	

==== 1860 by-election ====
1860 The Williams by-election Thursday 16 February
Candidate	Votes	%
Alexander Campbell (elected)	143	54.2
William Allen	121	45.8
Total formal votes	264	100.0
Informal votes	0	0.0
Turnout	264	30.8

Stephen Dark resigned.

=== Elections in the 1850s ===
==== 1859 ====
1859 New South Wales colonial election: The Williams Thursday 16 June
Candidate	Votes	%
Stephen Dark (elected)	324	58.4
Samuel Gordon (defeated)	231	41.6
Total formal votes	555	100.0
Informal votes	0	0.0
Turnout	555	64.8

Samuel Gordon was the member for the abolished district of Durham.
