= Electoral results for the district of Hunter =

Election results for state seat of Hunter, New South Wales, Australia

Hunter, an electoral district of the Legislative Assembly in the Australian state of New South Wales was created in 1859 and abolished in 1894.

Period	Member	Party
1859	Richard Jones	None
1860 by	Isidore Blake	None
1860	Isidore Blake	None
1861 by	John Burns	None
1864	John Burns	None
1869	John Dillon	None
1872	John Burns	None
1875	John Burns	None
1877	John Burns	None
1880	John Burns	None
1882	John Burns	None
1885	John Burns	None
1887	John Burns	Free Trade
1889	Robert Scobie	Free Trade
1891	Robert Scobie	Free Trade

== Election results ==
=== Elections in the 1890s ===
==== 1891 ====
1891 New South Wales colonial election: The Hunter Friday 19 June
Party	Candidate	Votes	%	±%
Free Trade	Robert Scobie (elected)	677	49.6	
Protectionist	James Pritchard	455	33.4	
Protectionist	John Connelly	232	17.0	
Total formal votes		1,364	98.0	
Informal votes		28	2.0	
Turnout		1,392	70.3	
Free Trade hold				

=== Elections in the 1880s ===
==== 1889 ====
1889 New South Wales colonial election: The Hunter Saturday 9 February
Party	Candidate	Votes	%	±%
Free Trade	Robert Scobie (elected)	605	53.2	
Protectionist	William Turner	533	46.8	
Total formal votes		1,138	97.9	
Informal votes		25	2.2	
Turnout		1,163	71.5	
Free Trade hold				

==== 1887 ====
1887 New South Wales colonial election: The Hunter Monday 7 February
Party	Candidate	Votes	%	±%
Free Trade	John Burns (re-elected)	unopposed		

==== 1885 ====
1885 New South Wales colonial election: The Hunter Friday 23 October
Candidate	Votes	%
John Burns (re-elected)	unopposed	

==== 1882 ====
1882 New South Wales colonial election: The Hunter Monday 4 December
Candidate	Votes	%
John Burns (re-elected)	518	75.3
William Richardson	170	24.7
Total formal votes	688	97.3
Informal votes	19	2.7
Turnout	707	55.5

==== 1880 ====
1880 New South Wales colonial election: The Hunter Tuesday 23 November
Candidate	Votes	%
John Burns (re-elected)	644	60.3
John Nowlan	424	39.7
Total formal votes	1,068	97.5
Informal votes	28	2.6
Turnout	1,096	80.2

=== Elections in the 1870s ===
==== 1877 ====
1877 New South Wales colonial election: The Hunter Tuesday 30 October
Candidate	Votes	%
John Burns (re-elected)	unopposed	

==== 1874 ====
1874–75 New South Wales colonial election: The Hunter Saturday 2 January 1875
Candidate	Votes	%
John Burns (re-elected)	457	74.7
James O'Sullivan	155	25.3
Total formal votes	612	96.8
Informal votes	20	3.2
Turnout	632	50.6

==== 1872 ====
1872 New South Wales colonial election: The Hunter Saturday 2 March
Candidate	Votes	%
John Burns (elected)	500	61.7
John Dillon (defeated)	311	38.4
Total formal votes	811	98.0
Informal votes	17	2.1
Turnout	828	64.5

=== Elections in the 1860s ===
==== 1869 ====
1869–70 New South Wales colonial election: The Hunter Wednesday 15 December 1869
Candidate	Votes	%
John Dillon (elected)	319	49.5
John Burns (defeated)	286	44.3
Alfred Boggis	40	6.2
Total formal votes	645	100.0
Informal votes	0	0.0
Turnout	644	57.8

==== 1864 ====
1864–65 New South Wales colonial election: The Hunter Friday 9 December 1864
Candidate	Votes	%
John Burns (re-elected)	unopposed	

==== 1861 by-election ====
1861 Hunter by-election Monday 5 August
Candidate	Votes	%
John Burns (elected)	299	51.8
Henry Vindin	278	48.2
Total formal votes	577	100.0
Informal votes	0	0.0
Turnout	577	34.1

Isidore Blake resigned.

==== 1860 ====
1860 New South Wales colonial election: The Hunter Wednesday 12 December
Candidate	Votes	%
Isidore Blake (re-elected)	396	80.3
Peter Faucett	97	19.7
Total formal votes	493	100.0
Informal votes	0	0.0
Turnout	493	37.2

==== 1860 by-election ====
1860 Hunter by-election Monday 23 April
Candidate	Votes	%
Isidore Blake (elected)	unopposed	

Richard Jones resigned.

=== Elections in the 1850s ===
==== 1859 ====
1859 New South Wales colonial election: The Hunter Saturday 25 June
Candidate	Votes	%
Richard Jones (re-elected)	431	60.7
Daniel Deniehy	279	39.3
Total formal votes	710	100.0
Informal votes	0	0.0
Turnout	710	58.1
