= 1860 Hunter colonial by-election =

By-election in New South Wales, Australia

A by-election was held for the New South Wales Legislative Assembly electorate of Hunter on 25 April 1860 because of the resignation of Richard Jones.

== Dates ==
| Date | Event |
|---|---|
| 10 April 1860 | Richard Jones resigned. |
| 11 April 1860 | Writ of election issued by the Speaker of the Legislative Assembly. |
| 23 April 1860 | Nominations |
| 25 April 1860 | Polling day |
| 2 May 1860 | Return of writ |

== Result ==
1860 Hunter by-election Monday 23 April
| Candidate | Votes | % |
|---|---|---|
| Isidore Blake (elected) | unopposed | |

== See also ==
- Electoral results for the district of Hunter
- List of New South Wales state by-elections
