= 1861 Tenterfield colonial by-election =

By-election in New South Wales, Australia

A by-election was held for the New South Wales Legislative Assembly electorate of Tenterfield on 3 December 1861 because Robert Meston resigned. Meston sent a letter to the Speaker of the Legislative Assembly which stated "As I find it very inconvenient for my affairs at present to attend on the very inopportune sittings of the New Smith Wales Parliament, I hereby resign my seat as representative of the Tenterfield electorate".

== Dates ==
Date	Event
5 November 1861	Robert Meston resigned.
5 November 1861	Writ of election issued by the Speaker of the Legislative Assembly.
26 November 1861	Nominations at Tenterfield.
3 December 1861	Polling day between 9 am and 4 pm.
17 December 1861	Return of writ

== Polling places ==
- Tenterfield
- Glen Innes
- Inverell
- Dundee
- Ashford
- Maryland (Note: 80 kilometres (50 mi) north of Tenterfield.)

== Result ==
1861 Tenterfield by-election Monday 5 August
Candidate	Votes	%
Hugh Gordon (elected)	128	37.8
Marshall Burdekin	96	28.3
R R C Robertson	91	26.8
R W Vivers	24	7.1
Total formal votes	339	100.0
Informal votes	0	0.0
Turnout	339	52.3

== See also ==
- Electoral results for the district of Tenterfield
- List of New South Wales state by-elections
