= 1860 Williams colonial by-election =

By-election in New South Wales, Australia

A by-election was held for the New South Wales Legislative Assembly electorate of The Williams on 16 February 1860 because Stephen Dark resigned.

== Dates ==
Date	Event
25 January 1860	Stephen Dark resigned.
25 January 1860	Writ of election issued by the Speaker of the Legislative Assembly.
9 February 1860	Nominations at Dungog.
16 February 1860	Polling day.
23 February 1860	Return of writ

== Polling places ==
- Dungog
- Bandon Grove
- Brookfield
- Clarence Town
- Stroud
- Gloucester

== Result ==
1860 The Williams by-election Thursday 16 February
Candidate	Votes	%
Alexander Campbell (elected)	143	54.2
William Allen	121	45.8
Total formal votes	264	100.0
Informal votes	0	0.0
Turnout	264	30.8

== See also ==
- Electoral results for the district of Williams
- List of New South Wales state by-elections
