= Electoral results for the district of Paterson =

Election results for Paterson, New South Wales, Australia

The Paterson, an electoral district of the Legislative Assembly in the Australian state of New South Wales, was created in 1859 and abolished in 1894.

| Election | Member | Party |
|---|---|---|
| 1859 | William Arnold | None |
| 1860 | William Arnold | None |
| 1864 | William Arnold | None |
| 1869 | William Arnold | None |
| 1872 | William Arnold | None |
| 1874 | William Arnold | None |
| 1875 by | Herbert Brown | None |
| 1877 | Herbert Brown | None |

== Election results ==
=== Elections in the 1870s ===
==== 1877 ====
1877 New South Wales colonial election: The Paterson Saturday 27 October
| Candidate | Votes | % |
|---|---|---|
| Herbert Brown (re-elected) | unopposed | |

==== 1875 by-election ====
1875 Paterson by-election Thursday 18 March
| Candidate | Votes | % |
|---|---|---|
| Herbert Brown (elected) | 149 | 53.2 |
| James Brunker | 81 | 28.9 |
| Robert Park | 27 | 9.6 |
| Marshall Burdekin | 19 | 6.8 |
| John Jurley | 2 | 0.7 |
| John Nowlan | 2 | 0.7 |
| Total formal votes | 280 | 97.2 |
| Informal votes | 8 | 2.8 |
| Turnout | 288 | 52.3 |

William Arnold died.

==== 1874 ====
1874–75 New South Wales colonial election: The Paterson Friday 18 December 1874
| Candidate | Votes | % |
|---|---|---|
| William Arnold (re-elected) | 205 | 56.9 |
| Herbert Brown | 155 | 43.1 |
| Total formal votes | 360 | 100.0 |
| Informal votes | 0 | 0.0 |
| Turnout | 368 | 66.8 |

==== 1872 ====
1872 New South Wales colonial election: The Paterson Saturday 17 February
| Candidate | Votes | % |
|---|---|---|
| William Arnold (re-elected) | 144 | 96.0 |
| George Townshend | 6 | 4.0 |
| Total formal votes | 150 | 100.0 |
| Informal votes | 0 | 0.0 |
| Turnout | 150 | 25.0 |

=== Elections in the 1860s ===
==== 1869 ====
1869–70 New South Wales colonial election: The Paterson Wednesday 15 December 1869
| Candidate | Votes | % |
|---|---|---|
| William Arnold (re-elected) | 285 | 76.2 |
| Herbert Brown | 88 | 23.5 |
| George Townshend | 1 | 0.3 |
| Total formal votes | 374 | 100.0 |
| Informal votes | 0 | 0.0 |
| Turnout | 374 | 64.2 |

==== 1864 ====
1864–65 New South Wales colonial election: The Paterson Wednesday 14 December 1864
| Candidate | Votes | % |
|---|---|---|
| William Arnold (re-elected) | 217 | 62.0 |
| Geoffrey Eagar | 133 | 38.0 |
| Total formal votes | 350 | 100.0 |
| Informal votes | 0 | 0.0 |
| Turnout | 350 | 65.3 |

==== 1860 ====
1860 New South Wales colonial election: The Paterson Saturday 8 December
| Candidate | Votes | % |
|---|---|---|
| William Arnold (re-elected) | 95 | 96.9 |
| Edward Druitt | 3 | 3.1 |
| Total formal votes | 98 | 100.0 |
| Informal votes | 0 | 0.0 |
| Turnout | 92 | 20.0 |

=== Elections in the 1850s ===
==== 1859 ====
1859 New South Wales colonial election: The Paterson Thursday 16 June
| Candidate | Votes | % |
|---|---|---|
| William Arnold (re-elected) | 159 | 70.4 |
| Henry Dangar | 62 | 27.4 |
| William Bucknell | 5 | 2.2 |
| Total formal votes | 226 | 100.0 |
| Informal votes | 0 | 0.0 |
| Turnout | 223 | 54.3 |
