= 1875 Paterson colonial by-election =

By-election in New South Wales, Australia

A by-election was held for the New South Wales Legislative Assembly electorate of Paterson on 18 March 1875 caused by the death of William Arnold.

== Dates ==
Date	Event
1 March 1875	Death of William Arnold.
5 March 1875	Writ of election issued by the Speaker of the Legislative Assembly.
11 March 1875	Nominations
18 March 1875	Polling day
22 March 1875	Return of writ

== Results ==
1875 Paterson by-election Thursday 18 March
Candidate	Votes	%
Herbert Brown (elected)	149	53.2
James Brunker	81	28.9
Robert Park	27	9.6
Marshall Burdekin	19	6.8
John Jurley	2	0.7
John Nowlan	2	0.7
Total formal votes	280	97.2
Informal votes	8	2.8
Turnout	288	52.3

== See also ==
- Electoral results for the district of Paterson
- List of New South Wales state by-elections
