= 1861 Hunter colonial by-election =

By-election in New South Wales, Australia

A by-election was held for the New South Wales Legislative Assembly electorate of The Hunter on 5 August 1861 because Isidore Blake resigned to accept appointment as a judge of the District Court.

== Dates ==
Date	Event
9 July 1861	Isidore Blake resigned.
13 July 1861	Writ of election issued by the Speaker of the Legislative Assembly.
31 July 1861	Nominations at West Maitland.
5 August 1861	Polling day between 9 am and 4 pm.
15 August 1861	Return of writ

== Polling places ==
- West Maitland
- Largs
- Bishop's Bridge
- Lochinvar
- Branxton

== Result ==
1861 Hunter by-election Monday 5 August
Candidate	Votes	%
John Burns (elected)	299	51.8
Henry Vindin	278	48.2
Total formal votes	577	100.0
Informal votes	0	0.0
Turnout	577	34.1

== See also ==
- Electoral results for the district of Hunter
- List of New South Wales state by-elections
