= 1882 Tenterfield colonial by-election =

By-election in New South Wales, Australia

A by-election was held for the New South Wales Legislative Assembly electorate of Tenterfield on 6 February 1882 because of the resignation of John Dillon, to accept an appointment as senior stipendiary magistrate.

== Dates ==
Date	Event
5 January 1882	John Dillon resigned.
6 January 1882	John Dillon appointed a magistrate.
9 January 1882	Writ of election issued by the Speaker of the Legislative Assembly.
27 January 1882	Nominations
6 February 1882	Polling day
20 February 1882	Return of writ

== Candidates ==
- Edward Bennett was a barrister from Sydney, who had stood unsuccessfully for Glen Innes in 1880.
- Augustus Fraser was a local pastoralist. This was his only candidacy for the Legislative Assembly.

== Result ==
1882 Tenterfield by-election Tuesday 10 January
Candidate	Votes	%
Augustus Fraser (elected)	674	53.7
Edward Bennett	580	46.3
Total formal votes	1,254	97.2
Informal votes	36	2.8
Turnout	1,290	68.2

== See also ==
- Electoral results for the district of Tenterfield
- List of New South Wales state by-elections
