= April 1866 Williams colonial by-election =

By-election in New South Wales, Australia

A by-election was held for the New South Wales Legislative Assembly electorate of The Williams on 19 April 1866 because the seat of Frederick Manton was declared vacant due to insolvency.

== Dates ==
Date	Event
22 January 1866	Frederick Manton elected in the by-election.
29 March 1866	Frederick Manton's seat declared vacant due to insolvency.
29 March 1866	Writ of election issued by the Speaker of the Legislative Assembly.
14 April 1866	Nominations.
19 April 1866	Polling day
30 April 1866	Return of writ

== Result ==
1866 Williams by-election Thursday 19 April
Candidate	Votes	%
John Nowlan (elected)	375	49.2
Joseph Abbott	205	26.9
Archibald Jacob	182	23.9
Total formal votes	762	100.0
Informal votes	0	0.0
Turnout	762	57.0

== See also ==
- Electoral results for the district of Williams (New South Wales)
- List of New South Wales state by-elections
