= 1877 Williams colonial by-election =

By-election in New South Wales, Australia

A by-election was held for the New South Wales Legislative Assembly electorate of The Williams on 12 February 1877 because of the resignation of William Watson.

== Dates ==
Date	Event
16 January 1877	William Watson resigned from parliament.
17 January 1877	Writ of election issued by the Speaker of the Legislative Assembly.
5 February 1877	Nominations in Dungog
12 February 1877	Polling day
23 February 1877	Return of writ

== Candidates ==
- William Johnston was a general merchant at Clarence Town. This was his first occasion standing for the Legislative Assembly.
- John Nowlan was a cattle breeder from Maitland who had represented The Williams from 1866 until 1874.

== Result ==
1877 The Williams by-election Monday 12 February
Candidate	Votes	%
William Johnston (elected)	526	56.4
John Nowlan	409	43.6
Total formal votes	938	98.4
Informal votes	15	1.6
Turnout	953	68.2

== See also ==
- Electoral results for the district of Williams
- List of New South Wales state by-elections
