= See ministry =

New South Wales government ministry led by John See

- 30th Cabinet of the State of New South Wales

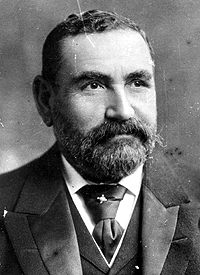
- Premier Sir John See
- Date formed: 28 March 1901
- Date dissolved: 14 June 1904

People and organisations
- Monarch: Edward VII
- Governor: The Earl Beauchamp / Sir Harry Rawson
- Premier: Sir John See
- No. of ministers: 12
- Member party: Progressive
- Status in legislature: Minority government
- Opposition party: Liberal Reform
- Opposition leader: Charles Lee (1901–1902); Joseph Carruthers (1902–1904)

History
- Election: 1901 New South Wales election
- Outgoing election: 1904 New South Wales election
- Predecessor: Lyne ministry
- Successor: Waddell ministry

The See ministry was the 30th ministry of the New South Wales Government, and was led by the 14th Premier, Sir John See. (Note: In 1902, See was appointed a Knight Commander of the Order of St Michael and St George whilst in office.) The title of Premier was widely used to refer to the Leader of Government, but was not a formal position in the government until 1920. Instead the Premier was appointed to another portfolio, usually Colonial Secretary.

See was elected to the New South Wales Legislative Assembly in 1880 as member for Grafton, serving in the Dibbs and Lyne ministries, prior to assuming leadership of the Progressive Party.

Under the constitution, ministers in the Legislative Assembly were required to recontest their seats in an election when appointed. Such ministerial by-elections were usually uncontested and on this occasion there were only three new ministers, Robert Fitzgerald, John Kidd and Thomas Waddell and all were re-elected unopposed. Fitzgerald was defeated at the 1901 election for Robertson and was not replaced as Minister of Justice with Bernhard Wise KC, the Attorney General, taking on the additional responsibilities. Hugh Pollock, the secretary of the Attorney General's Department, was appointed as a non-political Solicitor General to assist the Attorney General by taking responsibility for committal proceedings. Pollock's appointment was controversial because he was a public servant and had never practiced as a barrister. Francis Suttor was appointed President of the Legislative Council in 1903 and was replaced in the ministry by Kenneth Mackay.

This was the first occasion in which ministers were appointed to the Executive Council (or cabinet) without responsibility for a department or portfolio. It was initially 2 ministers James Hayes, and Walter Bennett, with John Fegan added in 1903. They were not paid in addition to their allowance as a member of parliament, (Note: Members of the Legislative Assembly had been paid an allowance since 1889.) did not have an "office of profit" and were not required to recontest their seats at a by-election.

The ministry covers the period from 28 March 1901 until 14 June 1904, when failing health and the death of his wife in March 1904 compelled him to retire. See was succeeded by his Progressive Party colleague, Thomas Waddell.

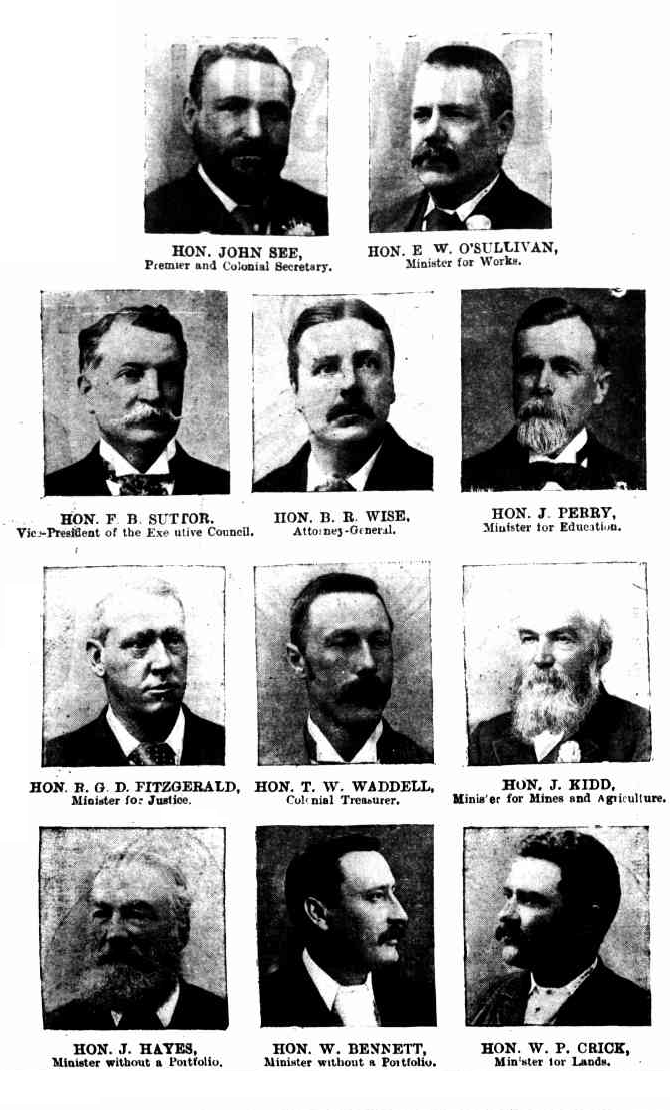

== Composition of ministry ==
The composition of the ministry was announced by Premier See on 28 March 1901 and covers the period up to 14 June 1904.

Portfolio	Minister	Party	Term start	Term end	Term length
Premier; Colonial Secretary; Registrar of Records	Sir John See	Progressive	28 March 1901	14 June 1904	3 years, 78 days
Colonial Treasurer; Collector of Internal Revenue	Thomas Waddell	Progressive	10 April 1901	14 June 1904	3 years, 65 days
Attorney-General	Bernhard Wise KC, MLC	Progressive	28 March 1901	14 June 1904	3 years, 78 days
Minister of Justice	Bernhard Wise KC, MLC	Progressive	22 July 1901	14 June 1904	2 years, 328 days
Minister of Justice	Robert Fitzgerald	Progressive	11 April 1901	16 July 1901	96 days
Secretary for Lands	Paddy Crick	Progressive	11 April 1901	14 June 1904	3 years, 64 days
Secretary for Public Works	Edward O'Sullivan	Progressive	28 March 1901	14 June 1904	3 years, 78 days
Minister of Public Instruction; Minister for Labour and Industry	John Perry	Progressive	28 March 1901	14 June 1904	3 years, 78 days
Secretary for Mines and Agriculture	John Kidd	Progressive	10 April 1901	14 June 1904	3 years, 65 days
Vice-President of the Executive Council; Representative of the Government in Legislative Council	Francis Suttor MLC	Progressive	28 March 1901	23 May 1903	2 years, 56 days
Vice-President of the Executive Council; Representative of the Government in Legislative Council	Kenneth Mackay, MLC	Progressive	6 June 1903	14 June 1904	1 year, 8 days
Ministers without portfolio	James Hayes	Progressive	11 April 1901	14 June 1904	3 years, 64 days
Ministers without portfolio	Walter Bennett	Progressive	16 April 1901	14 June 1904	3 years, 59 days
Ministers without portfolio	John Fegan	Progressive	24 March 1903	14 June 1904	1 year, 82 days

Ministers were members of the Legislative Assembly unless otherwise noted.

== See also ==
- Federation of Australia
  - Members of Legislative Assembly
  - (1901-1904)
  - Members of Legislative Council
  - (1901–1904)

== Notes ==
Preceded by Lyne ministry	See ministry 1901–1904	Succeeded by Waddell ministry
