= 1884 Tenterfield colonial by-election =

By-election in New South Wales, Australia

A by-election for the seat of Tenterfield in the New South Wales Legislative Assembly was held on 20 November 1884 because of the resignation of Sir Henry Parkes, stating that he was retiring from politics and that "I have no intention of seeking or accepting a seat in any future Parliament".

== Dates ==
Date	Event
8 November 1884	Sir Henry Parkes resigned.
12 November 1884	Writ of election issued by the Speaker of the Legislative Assembly.
20 November 1884	Day of nomination
24 November 1884	Polling day
1 December 1884	Return of writ

== Result ==
1884 Tenterfield by-election Monday 20 November
Candidate	Votes	%
Charles Lee (elected)	unopposed	

== Aftermath ==
Despite Sir Henry's statement that he was retiring from politics, he re-entered the Legislative Assembly at the Argyle by-election on 31 March 1885, and would become Premier for a fourth time in 1887.

== See also ==
- Electoral results for the district of Tenterfield
- List of New South Wales state by-elections
