= 1866 Williams colonial by-election =

1866 Williams colonial by-election may refer to

- January 1866 Williams colonial by-election
- April 1866 Williams colonial by-election

== See also ==
- List of New South Wales state by-elections
