= 1874 Tenterfield colonial by-election =

By-election in New South Wales, Australia

A by-election was held for the New South Wales Legislative Assembly electorate of Tenterfield on 24 August 1874 because Robert Abbott had been appointed Secretary for Mines in the first Parkes ministry. Such ministerial by-elections were usually uncontested.

Edward Jones was an auctioneer from Glen Innes, and this was the first and only time he was a candidate for the Legislative Assembly.

== Dates ==
Date	Event
27 July 1874	Robert Abbott appointed Secretary for Mines.
29 July 1874	Writ of election issued by the Speaker of the Legislative Assembly.
17 August 1874	Nominations.
24 August 1874	Polling day
30 September 1874	Return of writ

== Result ==
1874 Tenterfield by-election Monday 24 August
Candidate	Votes	%
Robert Abbott (re-elected)	658	74.7
Edward Jones	223	25.3
Total formal votes	881	100.0
Informal votes	0	0.0
Turnout	881	24.4

== See also ==
- Electoral results for the district of Tenterfield
- List of New South Wales state by-elections
