= Robert Scobie =

Robert Scobie may refer to:

- Robert Scobie (Australian politician, born 1831) (1831–1909), New South Wales politician, member for Hunter
- Robert Scobie (Australian politician, born 1848) (1848–1917), New South Wales politician, member for Wentworth and for Murray
