= Members of the New South Wales Legislative Council, 1901–1904 =

Members of the New South Wales Legislative Council who served from 1901 to 1904 were appointed for life by the Governor on the advice of the Premier. This list includes members between the state election on 3 July 1901 and the state election on 6 August 1904. The President was Sir John Lackey until 23 May 1903 and then Sir Francis Suttor.

Non-Labor party affiliations at this time were fluid, and especially in the Legislative Council regarded more as loose labels than genuine parties.

Name	Party	Years in office
Benjamin Backhouse (Note: Benjamin Backhouse died on 29 July 1904.)	Independent	1895–1904
Reginald Black	Liberal Reform	1900–1928
Richard Bowker (Note: Richard Bowker died on 3 April 1903.)	Independent	1888–1903
Alexander Brown	Progressive	1892–1926
Nicholas Buzacott	Labour	1899–1933
William Campbell	Progressive	1890–1906
Samuel Charles	Progressive	1885–1909
George Cox (Note: George Cox died on 28 November 1901.)	Liberal Reform	1863–1901
John Creed	Liberal Reform	1885–1930
William Cullen	Liberal Reform	1895–1910
Henry Dangar	Liberal Reform	1883–1917
George Day	Independent	1889–1906
George Earp	Progressive	1900–1933
Robert Fitzgerald (Note: Robert Fitzgerald was appointed on 1 September 1901.)	Liberal Reform	1901–1933
Fred Flowers	Labour	1900–1928
Robert Fowler	Liberal Reform	1895–1906
George Greene	Liberal Reform	1899–1911
Edward Greville (Note: Edward Greville died on 9 July 1903.)	Progressive	1892–1903
Nicholas Hawken	Liberal Reform	1899–1908
John Hepher	Labour	1899–1932
Louis Heydon	Liberal Reform	1889–1918
William Hill	Progressive	1900–1919
William Holborow	Liberal Reform	1899–1917
John Hughes	Liberal Reform	1895–1912
Frederick Humphery	Liberal Reform	1888–1908
Solomon Hyam (Note: Solomon Hyam died on 8 November 1901.)	Progressive	1892–1901
Richard Jones	Liberal Reform	1899–1909
Henry Kater	Independent	1889–1924
Andrew Kerr	Liberal Reform	1888–1907
Alexander Kethel	Liberal Reform	1895–1916
Philip King (Note: Philip King died on 5 August 1904.)	Liberal Reform	1880–1904
Sir John Lackey (Note: Sir John Lackey died on 11 November 1903.)	Progressive	1885–1903
Hugh Langwell (Note: Hugh Langwell resigned on 20 January 1902 as he had been appointed a Commissioner of the Western Lands Board.)	Labour	1900–1902
George Lee	Liberal Reform	1882–1912
William Long	Liberal Reform	1885–1909
John Lucas (Note: John Lucas died on 1 March 1902.)	Liberal Reform	1880–1902
John Macintosh	Independent	1882–1911
Kenneth Mackay	Progressive	1899–1934
Charles Mackellar (Note: Charles Mackellar resigned on 19 October 1903 as he had been appointed a Senator for New South Wales.) (Note: Charles Mackellar did not contest the 1903 federal election and was re-appointed on 26 November 1903.)	Progressive	1885–1903, 1903–1925
Sir Normand MacLaurin	Independent	1889–1914
Sir Samuel McCaughey	Independent	1899–1919
John Meagher	Progressive	1900–1920
Alfred Meeks	Progressive	1900–1932
Henry Moses	Liberal Reform	1885–1923
John Nash	Progressive	1900–1925
James Norton	Liberal Reform	1879–1906
William Pigott	Liberal Reform	1887–1907
Charles Pilcher	Liberal Reform	1891–1916
Sir Arthur Renwick	Liberal Reform	1888–1908
Charles Roberts	Liberal Reform	1890–1925
Richard Roberts (Note: Richard Roberts died on 17 June 1903.)	Liberal Reform	1882–1903
William Robson	Progressive	1900–1920
Alexander Ross	Progressive	1900–1912
Alexander Ryrie	Independent	1892–1909
Patrick Shepherd (Note: Patrick Shepherd died on 31 July 1903.)	Liberal Reform	1888–1903
Thomas Slattery	Progressive	1900–1905
Fergus Smith	Liberal Reform	1895–1924
Thomas Smith (Note: Thomas Smith died on 27 July 1902.)	Progressive	1892–1902
Henry Stuart	Labour	1900–1910
Sir Francis Suttor	Progressive	1889–1891, 1900–1915
George Thornton (Note: George Thornton died on 23 November 1901.)	Liberal Reform	1877–1901
John Toohey (Note: John Toohey died on 5 May 1903.)	Progressive	1892–1903
William Trickett	Liberal Reform	1888–1916
Ebenezer Vickery	Liberal Reform	1887–1906
William Walker	Liberal Reform	1888–1908
Jack Want	Liberal Reform	1894–1905
James Watson	Liberal Reform	1887–1907
James Wilson	Labour	1899–1925
Bernhard Wise	Liberal Reform	1900–1908

== See also ==
- See ministry
- Waddell ministry
