= Waddell ministry =

New South Wales government ministry led by Thomas Waddell

- 31st Cabinet of the State of New South Wales

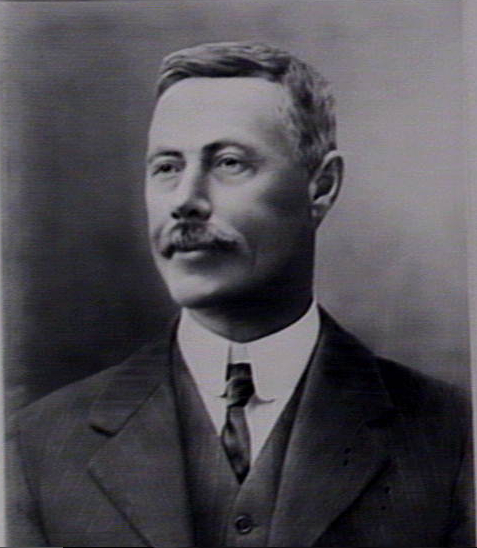
- Premier Thomas Waddell
- Date formed: 14 June 1904
- Date dissolved: 29 August 1904

People and organisations
- Monarch: Edward VII
- Governor: Sir Harry Rawson
- Premier: Thomas Waddell
- No. of ministers: 8
- Member party: Progressive
- Status in legislature: Minority government
- Opposition party: Liberal Reform
- Opposition leader: Joseph Carruthers

History
- Election: 1901 New South Wales election
- Outgoing election: 1904 New South Wales election
- Predecessor: See ministry
- Successor: Carruthers ministry

The Waddell ministry was the 31st ministry of the New South Wales Government, and was led by the 15th Premier, Thomas Waddell. The title of Premier was widely used to refer to the Leader of Government, but was not a formal position in the government until 1920. Instead the Premier was appointed to another portfolio, usually Colonial Secretary, however in this case Waddell chose to retain his previous portfolio of Colonial Treasurer.

Waddell was elected to the New South Wales Legislative Assembly in 1887 as member for Bourke, serving in the See ministry, prior to assuming leadership of the Progressive Party following the retirement of Sir John See, KCMG due to ill health. The Governor, Sir Harry Rawson, was not prepared to appoint Paddy Crick as Premier, due to his excessive drinking in cabinet meetings, nor Bernhard Wise, who he regarded as unreliable. Waddell was appointed instead and both Crick and Wise declined to serve in his ministry. The three vacancies were filled by the appointment of barrister James Gannon from outside of parliament to be Attorney General and the promotion of ministers without portfolio John Fegan and Walter Bennett.

Under the constitution, ministers in the Legislative Assembly vacated their seats on appointment and would have to regain the seat at a by-election. On this occasion there were only two new ministers, Walter Bennett and John Fegan. They had been ministers without portfolio in the See ministry however the absence of a portfolio meant they were not paid in addition to their allowance as a member of parliament. Their appointment to a portfolio in this ministry meant they had been appointed to an "office of profit" and their seats were vacated on acceptance. No by-elections were held however as parliament was dissolved on 16 July 1904 for the general election.

The ministry covers the period from 14 June 1904 until 29 August 1904. Waddell's Progressive Party was defeated at the 1904 state election, however remained in office until parliament sat and provided supply for the incoming government. Waddell was succeeded by Joseph Carruthers and his Liberal Reform Party.

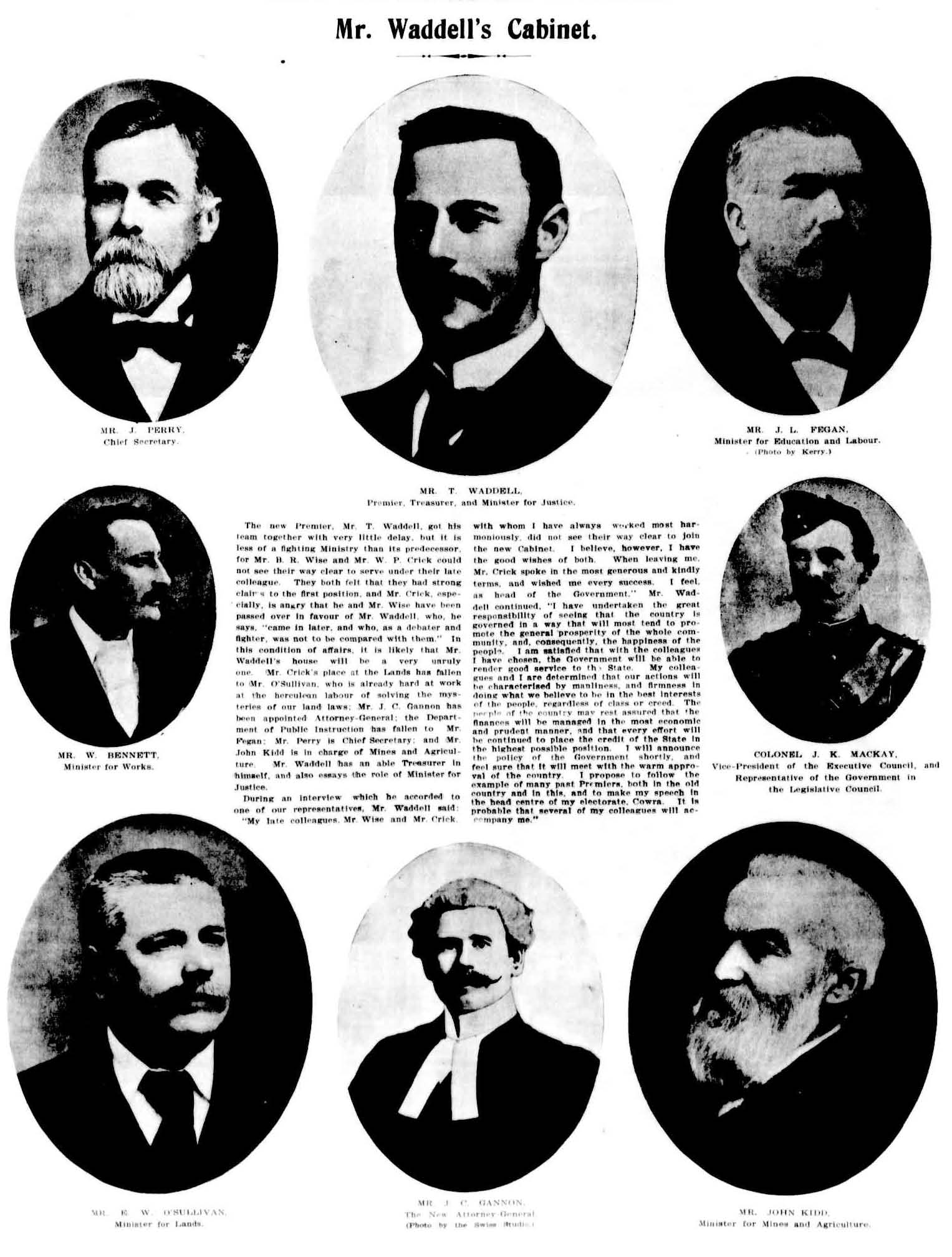

== Composition of ministry ==
The composition of the ministry was announced by Premier Waddell on 15 June 1904 and covers the period up to 29 August 1904.

Portfolio	Minister	Party	Term commence	Term end	Term of office
Premier; Colonial Treasurer; Collector of Internal Revenue; Minister of Justice	Thomas Waddell	Progressive	15 June 1904	29 August 1904	75 days
Colonial Secretary; Registrar of Records	John Perry	Progressive	15 June 1904	29 August 1904	75 days
Attorney General	James Gannon MLC	Progressive	15 June 1904	29 August 1904	75 days
Secretary for Lands	Edward O'Sullivan	Progressive	15 June 1904	29 August 1904	75 days
Secretary for Public Works	Walter Bennett	Progressive	17 June 1904	29 August 1904	73 days
Minister of Public Instruction; Minister for Labour and Industry	John Fegan	Progressive	15 June 1904	29 August 1904	75 days
Secretary for Mines and Agriculture	John Kidd	Progressive	15 June 1904	29 August 1904	75 days
Vice-President of the Executive Council; Representative of the Government in Legislative Council	Kenneth Mackay MLC	Progressive	15 June 1904	29 August 1904	75 days

Ministers were members of the Legislative Assembly unless otherwise noted.

== See also ==
  - Members of Legislative Assembly
  - (1901-1904)
  - Members of Legislative Council
  - (1901–1904)

Preceded by See ministry	Waddell ministry 1904	Succeeded by Carruthers ministry
