= Electoral district of Williams =

There are two abolished electorates by the name of Williams in Australia:

- Electoral district of Williams (New South Wales)
- Electoral district of Williams (Western Australia)
