= Walter Bennett (politician) =

Australian politician (1864–1934)

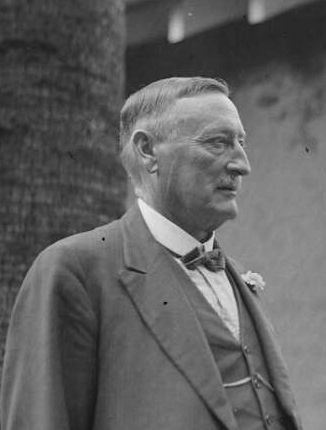
- Born: 11 March 1864; Wellington, New Zealand
- Died: 16 July 1934 (aged 70); Mosman
- Political party: Coalition

Walter Bennett (11 March 1864 – 16 July 1934) was a politician, journalist and printer in New South Wales, Australia.

== Biography ==
He was born in Wellington, New Zealand, to labourer Thomas Bennett and Maria, née Cole. After a local education he became a journalist, eventually owning a newspaper in the Wairarapa district. On 10 December 1884 he married Margaret Mahoney at Dunedin, with whom he would have six children. He arrived in New South Wales in 1885 and purchased the Moruya Times, and in 1888 added the Dungog Chronicle, which he also edited.

In 1898, he was elected to the New South Wales Legislative Assembly as an independent protectionist, representing Durham. He joined the Progressive Party in 1901 and remained a member until 1907, when he was defeated as part of the Progressives' electoral destruction. He had served as a minister without portfolio in the See ministry from 1901 to 1904, and for two months as Secretary for Public Works in the Waddell ministry from June to August 1904. In 1913, he served as president of the recently formed Country Party Association.

Bennett remained active in the community of the Dungog area and became involved in the Farmers and Settlers Association. In 1917 he was re-elected as the independent member for Durham, ultimately joining the new, rural-based Progressive Party. During the period of proportional representation he was one of the members for Maitland. He was part of the Coalition faction of the Progressives, and in 1922, in common with the rest of that group, he joined the Nationalist Party. When single-member districts were re-introduced in 1927 he represented Gloucester.

Bennett died at Mosman in 1934 and was succeeded in the Assembly by his son Charles. His funeral service was held at St. Chads Church, Cremorne on 17 July 1934. His body was transported to Dungog, New South Wales for burial.

Parliament of New South Wales
Political offices
Preceded by Edward O'Sullivan	Secretary for Public Works; June – August 1904	Succeeded by Charles Lee
New South Wales Legislative Assembly
Preceded by Herbert Brown	Member for Durham; 1898–1907	Succeeded by William Brown
Preceded by William Brown	Member for Durham; 1917–1920	Succeeded by Seat abolished
Preceded by Charles Nicholson	Member for Maitland; 1920–1927; Served alongside: Cameron, O'Hearn	Succeeded by Walter O'Hearn
Preceded by New seat	Member for Gloucester; 1927–1934	Succeeded by Charles Bennett
