= William Brown (New South Wales politician) =

Australian politician

William Brown (8 October 1867 – 30 June 1954) was an Australian politician.

He was born at Nelsons Plains to farmer Samuel Brown and Elizabeth Parsons. He attended local public schools and farmed some land before moving to Sydney to join a printing partnership. He returned to Raymond Terrace in 1893 to establish the Examiner, which he owned and edited until his death. He married Agnes Partridge, with whom he had three sons. In 1907 he was elected to the New South Wales Legislative Assembly as the Liberal member for Durham. He held the seat until his defeat in 1917. Brown died at Raymond Terrace in 1954.

New South Wales Legislative Assembly
Preceded by Walter Bennett	Member for Durham; 1907–1917	Succeeded by Walter Bennett
