= James Gannon (politician) =

Politician and barrister in New South Wales, Australia

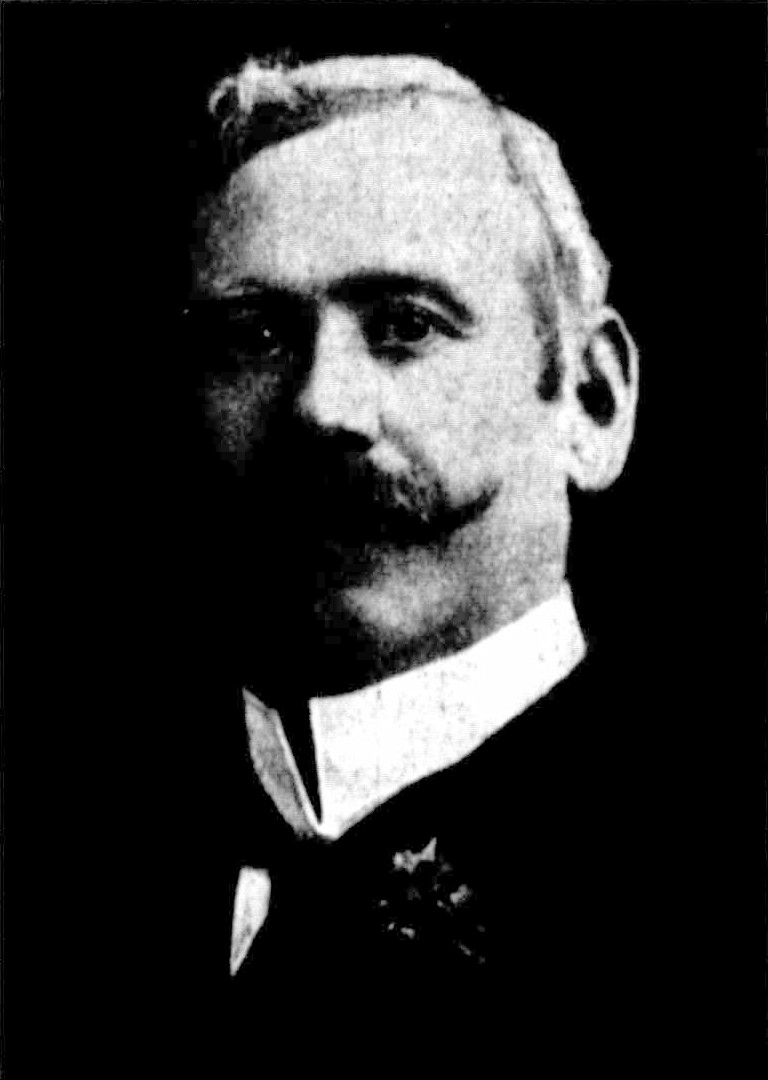
Gannon

James Conley Gannon KC (11 October 1859 – 30 September 1924) was an Australian politician.

He was born in Tempe to coach proprietor Robert Gannon and Agnes Conley. He received a public education before becoming a clerk, first in the library and then the Colonial Secretary's department. From 1885 he studied law, and on 12 March 1887 he was called to the bar and worked mostly in criminal law. On 18 January 1889 he married Florence Elsie May Jackson, with whom he had two children. As a barrister he worked mostly in criminal and divorce law.

In 1904 he was appointed Attorney General in the Waddell government and appointed to the New South Wales Legislative Council. He served in this post from June to August, when the Waddell government was defeated. Gannon remained in the Council until his death.

He returned to practice as a barrister and was appointed King's Counsel on 2 March 1910.

Gannon died from pneumonia at Camperdown on 30 September 1924 (aged 64). His wife Florence had predeceased him in 1929 and he was survived by his children Guy and Pearl.
