= January 1866 Williams colonial by-election =

By-election in New South Wales, Australia

A by-election was held for the New South Wales Legislative Assembly electorate of The Williams on 22 January 1866 because Marshall Burdekin had been appointed Colonial Treasurer in the fourth Cowper ministry. Such ministerial by-elections were usually uncontested; however, on this occasion a poll was required at both The Williams and West Sydney (John Robertson). Both Robertson and Burdekin were defeated, with the Cowper government falling, replaced by the second Martin ministry.

== Dates ==
Date	Event
1 January 1866	Marshall Burdekin appointed Colonial Treasurer.
9 January 1866	Writ of election issued by the Speaker of the Legislative Assembly.
18 January 1866	Nominations.
22 January 1866	Polling day
31 January 1866	Return of writ

== Result ==
1866 Williams by-election Monday 22 January
Candidate	Votes	%
Frederick Manton (elected)	366	56.1
Marshall Burdekin (defeated)	260	39.9
Henry Ellis	26	4.0
Joseph Abbott (Note: The New South Wales elections results database lists Joseph Abbott as a candidate. The report of the nominations by the Maitland Mercury says that Abbott withdrew in favour of Frederick Manton to avoid splitting the liberal vote.)	0	0.0
Total formal votes	652	100.0
Informal votes	0	0.0
Turnout	652	57.0

== See also ==
- Electoral results for the district of Williams (New South Wales)
- List of New South Wales state by-elections
