= The Moruya Times and South Coast Journal =

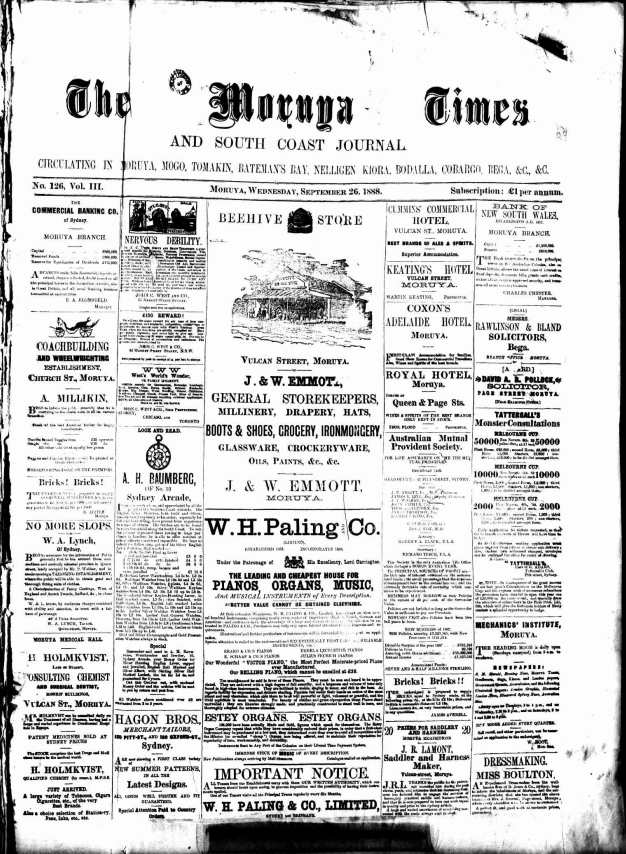
Moruya Times and South Coast Journal 26 September 1888

The Moruya Times and South Coast Journal was an English language newspaper published in Moruya, New South Wales, Australia from 1886 to 1915. At various times the paper was known as The Moruya Times and South Coast Journal, Tilba Times and South Dampier miner, and The Moruya-Tilba Times. A rival newspaper The Moruya Examiner has run continuously under various titles since 1863.

== History ==
The Moruya Times and South Coast Journal was first published in March 1886 every Wednesday by Walter Bennett, and later by William Boot. The newspaper has changed names several times:

Masthead	Years of publication
The Moruya Times and South Coast Journal	1886–1915
Tilba Times and South Dampier miner	1898–1902
The Moruya-Tilba Times	1902–1915

== Digitisation ==
The paper has been digitised as part of the Australian Newspapers Digitisation Program project of the National Library of Australia.

== See also ==
- List of newspapers in Australia
- List of newspapers in New South Wales
