= Alexander Campbell (Australian politician) =

Australian politician

Alexander Campbell (25 May 1812 – 8 November 1891) was a Scottish-born Australian politician.

== Early life ==
He was born in Relugas near Forres, Scotland, to farmer Donald Campbell and Janet née Ralph. A solicitor, he migrated to Sydney in 1838 and worked for a merchant firm until beginning his own business in 1840; he subsequently entered a partnership in 1842 as merchants and commercial agents. On 1 July 1842 he married Maria Martin, with whom he had four children; a second marriage on 6 October 1857 to Sarah Robertson Murray produced a further four children, while and third on 8 January 1873 to Harriet Hunt was childless.

== Political career ==
Campbell unsuccessfully stood as a candidate at the by-election for the Legislative Council seat of Sydney Hamlets in February 1855. He did not contest the first election for the Legislative Assembly, but stood for Shoalhaven at the 1859 election, finishing well back in 3rd. He was finally successful at the 1860 Williams by-election. He served in the assembly for less than 9 months before parliament was dissolved and he did not contest the general election later that year.

In 1864 he was appointed to the Legislative Council. From 1882 to 1883 he was Postmaster-General in the third Parkes ministry. He resigned from the Council in 1890 and died at Woollahra on 8 November 1891 (aged 79).

Parliament of New South Wales
Political offices
Preceded by Stephen Brown	Postmaster-General; 1886 – 1887	Succeeded by Alexander Campbell
New South Wales Legislative Assembly
Preceded by Stephen Dark	Member for Williams; 1860	Succeeded by William Allen
