= Colin Fraser (Australian politician) =

Australian politician

Colin Alexander Fraser (died 27 November 1877) was an Australian politician.

He was a pastoralist with properties at Byron Bay and Inverell. In 1869 he was elected to the New South Wales Legislative Assembly for Tenterfield, serving until his defeat in 1872. He died at Edinburgh in Scotland in 1877.

New South Wales Legislative Assembly
Preceded by Hugh Gordon	Member for Tenterfield; 1869–1872	Succeeded by Robert Abbott
