= John Fitzgerald Burns =

Australian politician (1833–1911)

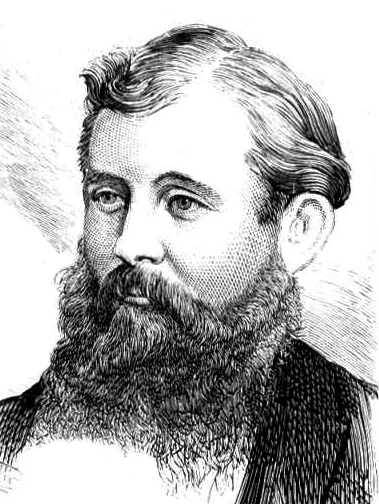
John Fitzgerald Burns, 1875 engraving

John Fitzgerald Burns (1833 – 19 March 1911) was an Australian politician, member of the Parliament of New South Wales, Postmaster-General in the 1870s and Colonial Treasurer in the 1880s.

Burns was born in the north of Ireland, and emigrated to New South Wales at an early age. In 1854 he married Lucy Maria Smith at Maitland.

Having engaged in mercantile pursuits in the Hunter River district, Burns was elected to the Legislative Assembly for Hunter at a by-election in 1861, holding the seat until his defeat in the 1869 election. He was unsuccessful at the 1870 Goldfields North by-election, but was elected for Hunter in the 1872 election. He was Postmaster-General in the third Robertson ministry from February 1875 to March 1877 and in the Farnell ministry from December 1877 to December 1878. He introduced postal cards into Australia in 1875, and was the first to give employment to women in the telegraph department. In 1878 he arranged with the Governments of the other Australian colonies and New Zealand for the duplication of the submarine cable to Australia. Burns was Colonial Treasurer in the fifth Robertson ministry from December 1885 to February 1886.

In January 1887 Burns was appointed Colonial Treasurer in the fourth ministry of Sir Henry Parkes, serving until January 1889. On 21 January 1887 his seat in the Legislative Assembly was declared vacant because of his acceptance of the position of Treasurer and he was summoned to the Legislative Council for the purpose of taking charge of the supply bill as the Representative of the Government in the Legislative Council. He took his seat in the council which passed the supply bill. A general election was called and Burns resigned from the council to re-contest the Hunter. 1887 was the first election in which political parties emerged. Burns, as a member of the Parkes government, stood as a Free Trade candidate and was re-elected unopposed at the 1887 election for The Hunter. He held the seat until 1889.

Burns switched to St Leonards for the 1889 election when it was expanded to return 3 members, and was the third member elected. He was narrowly defeated in the 1891 election. In the 1894 election for Willoughby he stood as an independent free trade candidate, but was unsuccessful, receiving only 86 votes (4.53%).

He was gazetted a Companion of the Order of St Michael and St George (CMG) in 1887, but declined the honour, and the appointment was cancelled.

Burns died in Paddington, New South Wales, on 19 March 1911 (aged 78).

Parliament of New South Wales
Political offices
Preceded by Saul Samuel	Postmaster-General; 1875 – 1877	Succeeded by Saul Samuel
Preceded by John Davies	Postmaster-General; 1877 – 1878	Succeeded by Saul Samuel
Preceded by George Dibbs	Colonial Treasurer; 1885 – 1886	Succeeded by Sir Patrick Jennings
Preceded by Sir Patrick Jennings	Colonial Treasurer; 1885 – 1886	Succeeded by James Garvan
New South Wales Legislative Assembly
Preceded by Isidore Blake	Member for Hunter; 1861 – 1869	Succeeded by John Dillon
Preceded by John Dillon	Member for Hunter; 1872 – 1889	Succeeded by Robert Scobie
Preceded by Isaac Ives; Henry Parkes	Member for St Leonards; 1889 – 1891; Served alongside: Joseph Cullen, Henry Parkes	Succeeded by Edward Clark
