= William Johnston (Australian politician) =

Scottish-born Australian politician

William Johnston (1829 – 22 April 1894) was a Scottish-born Australian politician.

He was born at Montrose to stonemason David Mellison Johnston and Agnes Merrillees. He migrated to New South Wales around 1838 and became a general merchant at Clarence Town on the bank of the Williams River. On 18 October 1853 he married Mary Little, with whom he had one son. In 1877 he was elected to the New South Wales Legislative Assembly for The Williams. The Williams was abolished in 1880 and largely replaced by Durham. Johnston stood for Durham, but was defeated by Herbert Brown.

Johnston died at Marrickville in 1894 (aged 64–65).

New South Wales Legislative Assembly
Preceded by William Watson	Member for The Williams; 1877–1880	Abolished
