= Randolph Nott =

Australian politician

Randolph Nott (1826 – 10 February 1916) was an Australian politician.

He was a Sydney timber merchant before entering politics. In 1859 he was elected to the New South Wales Legislative Assembly for Tenterfield, but he did not re-contest in 1860. Nott died at Bowral in 1916.

New South Wales Legislative Assembly
New seat	Member for Tenterfield; 1859–1860	Succeeded by Robert Meston
