= Stephen Dark =

English-born Australian politician

Stephen Neate Dark (1815 – 10 January 1872) was an Australian politician.

He was the son of farmer Stephen Dark and Mary Neate, and migrated to New South Wales around 1840. On 19 February 1841 he married Eliza Whiteman, with whom he had seven children. He ran a store at Dungog and a sawmill and flour mill at Stroud. In 1859 he was elected to the New South Wales Legislative Assembly for Williams, but he resigned in 1860. Dark died at Dungog in 1872.

New South Wales Legislative Assembly
New seat	Member for Williams; 1859–1860	Succeeded by Alexander Campbell
