= Electoral district of Durham =

Former state electoral district of New South Wales, Australia

Durham was an electoral district for the Legislative Assembly in the Australian state of New South Wales, named after Durham County, which lies on the north side of the Hunter River. From 1856 to 1859, it elected three members simultaneously by voters casting three votes with the three leading candidates being elected. It was abolished in 1859 with the county being split between the districts of Hunter, Lower Hunter, Upper Hunter, Morpeth, Paterson, Patrick's Plains and Williams.

It was recreated in 1880, replacing parts of Paterson and Williams, as a single-member electorate. It was abolished in 1920.

== Members for Durham ==
Three members (1856–1859)
Member	Party	Term	Member	Party	Term	Member	Party	Term
Richard Jones	None	1856–1859	William Arnold	None	1856–1859	Samuel Gordon	None	1856–1859
Single-member (1880–1920)
Member	Party	Term						
Herbert Brown	None	1880–1887						
Herbert Brown	Free Trade	1887–1894						
Herbert Brown	Ind. Free Trade	1894–1895						
Herbert Brown	Protectionist	1895–1898						
Walter Bennett	Ind. Protectionist	1898–1901						
Walter Bennett	Progressive	1901–1907						
William Brown	Independent Liberal	1907–1910						
William Brown	Liberal Reform	1910–1917						
William Brown	Nationalist	1917–1917						
Walter Bennett	Independent	1917–1920						

== Election results ==
1917 New South Wales state election: Durham
Party	Candidate	Votes	%	±%
Nationalist	William Brown	2,767	45.0	−5.4
Independent	Walter Bennett	1,872	30.5	−11.8
Labor	Walter O'Hearn	1,029	16.8	+9.5
Independent	Daniel Ferry	475	7.7	+7.7
Total formal votes		6,143	98.7	+0.9
Informal votes		78	1.3	−0.9
Turnout		6,221	65.9	−8.0

1917 New South Wales state election: Durham - Second Round
Party	Candidate	Votes	%	±%
Independent	Walter Bennett	3,021	50.1	
Nationalist	William Brown	3,005	49.9	
Total formal votes		6,026	99.4	+0.7
Informal votes		39	0.6	−0.7
Turnout		6,065	64.3	−1.6
Independent gain from Nationalist				
