= Robert Scobie (Australian politician, born 1831) =

Australian politician

Robert Scobie (7 September 1831 – 31 December 1909) was a Scottish-born Australian politician.

He was born in Stirlingshire to Michael Scobie and Elizabeth Heugh. His family arrived in New South Wales in 1839 and settled near Maitland. Scobie worked on the family property and also had success on the goldfields, eventually owning a vineyard and orchard at Mount Pleasant near Maitland from 1859. On 2 June 1859 he married Mary Warren, with whom he had fifteen children. A prominent figure in local agricultural circles and a supporter of the temperance movement, he was elected to the New South Wales Legislative Assembly at the 1889 election as the Free Trade member for Hunter. He held his seat at the 1891 election. The district was abolished and Scobie stood for the neighbouring district of West Maitland at the 1894 election but was defeated. Scobie died at his property at Oakhampton near Maitland in 1909.

New South Wales Legislative Assembly
Preceded by John Burns	Member for Hunter; 1889–1894	District abolished
