= Robert Abbott (New South Wales politician) =

Australian politician

- Born: Robert Palmer Abbott; 1830; Broadford, County Clare, Ireland
- Died: 31 October 1901 (aged 70–71); Tempe
- Occupation: politician

Robert Palmer Abbott (1830 – 31 October 1901) was a politician and solicitor in colonial New South Wales, a member of both the Legislative Assembly and Legislative Council.

Abbott was born in Broadford, County Clare in Ireland, and emigrated to Sydney as a boy with his parents, Eleanor, née Kingsmill and Thomas Abbott, policeman, arriving in the colony in 1838.

He was admitted a solicitor in 1854, subsequently specialising in litigation concerning the Robertson Land Acts, and had opened an office in Tamworth.

Abbott ran unsuccessfully for a seat in the Legislative Assembly at the 1869 election for Tenterfield, and the 1871 New England by-election, before winning the 1872 election for Tenterfield, serving as the member for Tenterfield until his defeat at the 1877 election. He was Secretary for Mines in the first ministry of Henry Parkes from 27 July 1874 until 8 February 1875, and was Mayor of East St Leonards from February 1878 until February 1879.

He returned to the Assembly as the member for Hartley at the 1880 election. He was nominated to the Legislative Council in 1885, and sat till 1 March 1888, when he resigned, owing to his objection to certain appointments. He was a member of the New South Wales Commission in London for the Colonial and Indian Exhibition of 1886.

He assisted his cousin, Joseph Abbott, be elected at the 1888 Newtown by-election, while his nephew, Sir Joseph Palmer Abbott, served in the Legislative Assembly for 21 years, including 10 years as Speaker.

Abbott never married and died at Tempe on 31 October 1901 (aged 70–71).

Political offices
Preceded by James Farnell	Secretary for Mines; July 1874 – February 1875	Succeeded by John Lucas
New South Wales Legislative Assembly
Preceded by Colin Fraser	Member for Tenterfield; 1872 – 1877	Succeeded by John Dillon
Preceded by John Hurley	Member for Hartley; 1880 – 1882	Succeeded by Walter Targett
Civic offices
Preceded by James Taylor	Mayor of East St Leonards; 1878 – 1879	Succeeded by George Matcham Pitt
