= Hugh Gordon (Australian politician) =

Scottish-born Australian politician

Hugh Gordon (1817 – 14 March 1895) was a Scottish-born Australian politician.

He was born at Rhynie to John and Margaret Gordon. In 1839 he migrated to New South Wales, settling in the New England region. He farmed on the Severn River and near Inverell, Warialda and on the Gwydir River. His first marriage, to Emily Catherine Hollingworth, produced five children; a second in 1860 to Caroline Elizabeth Hollingworth produced two daughters. In 1861 he was elected to the New South Wales Legislative Assembly for Tenterfield, serving until his retirement in 1869. Gordon died at Strathbogie in 1895.

New South Wales Legislative Assembly
Preceded by Robert Meston	Member for Tenterfield; 1861–1869	Succeeded by Colin Fraser
