= William Bell Allen =

Irish-born Australian politician

William Bell Allen (1812 – 5 December 1869) was an Irish-born Australian politician.

He was the son of farmer William Allen and Mary Bell. In 1835 he married Ruth Johnston; they had four children. In 1841 the family migrated to Sydney, where Allen established a soap and candle business. By the 1860s he was producing 300 tons of soap a year and exporting to New Zealand. In 1860 he was elected to the New South Wales Legislative Assembly for Williams, serving until his defeat in 1864. Allen died at Waverley in 1869. His sons William, and Alfred, both later served in the Legislative Assembly.

New South Wales Legislative Assembly
Preceded by Alexander Campbell	Member for Williams; 1860–1864	Succeeded by Marshall Burdekin
