= Robert Meston =

Australian politician

Robert Meston was an Australian politician.

He was a pastoralist in the Clarence River district before entering politics. In 1860 he was elected to the New South Wales Legislative Assembly for Tenterfield, but he resigned in 1861.

New South Wales Legislative Assembly
Preceded by Randolph Nott	Member for Tenterfield; 1860–1861	Succeeded by Hugh Gordon
