= Augustus Fraser =

Australian politician

Augustus Ryan Fraser (died 8 February 1890) was a politician and pastoralist in New South Wales, Australia.

A pastoralist and the owner of Mole River Station, he was elected to the New South Wales Legislative Assembly in a by-election for Tenterfield in 1882, but he did not contest the general election later that year. In 1870 he was living at Gyrah and was appointed a magistrate. In 1885 he was appointed a member of the Licensing Court for the Tenterfield district.

Little is known of him, although he died at Bournemouth in England in 1890.

New South Wales Legislative Assembly
Preceded by John Dillon	Member for Tenterfield; 1882	Succeeded by Sir Henry Parkes
