= William Watson (New South Wales politician) =

English-born Australian politician

William Watson (30 June 1815 – 15 May 1877) was an English-born Australian politician.

He was born at Winchelsea in Sussex, the illegitimate son of Bourn Russell and Elizabeth Watson. He migrated to New South Wales around 1829. He was a soda water and cordial manufacturer, and on 29 January 1842 married Esther Emma Leach, with whom he had thirteen children. In 1874 he was elected to the New South Wales Legislative Assembly for Williams, but he resigned in 1877 and died in Sydney later the same year.

New South Wales Legislative Assembly
Preceded by John Nowlan	Member for Williams; 1874–1877	Succeeded by William Johnston
