= John Dillon (Australian politician) =

Australian politician (1847–1888)

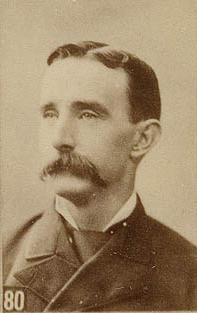
Dillon in c. 1880

John Thomas Dillon (1847 – 25 April 1888) was an Australian politician and prosecutor.

Dillon was born in West Maitland, New South Wales, to farmer Thomas Dillon and Catharine Hyndes. He attended school locally before studying classics at the University of Sydney, from which he received a Bachelor of Arts in 1868 and a Master of Arts in 1876. He was called to the bar in 1869. On 1 January 1881, he married Maude Annie Mohr. In 1869, he was elected to the New South Wales Legislative Assembly for Hunter, but he was defeated in 1872. In 1877, he returned to the assembly as the member for Tenterfield. He was re-elected in 1880, before resigning in 1882 on his appointment as chief magistrate. From 1885, he was crown prosecutor for the South West District.

Dillon died on 25 April 1888 in Burwood, Sydney.

New South Wales Legislative Assembly
Preceded by John Burns	Member for Hunter; 1869–1872	Succeeded by John Burns
Preceded by Robert Abbott	Member for Tenterfield; 1877–1882	Succeeded by Augustus Fraser
