= Frederick Manton =

Australian politician

Frederick Julian Manton (26 April 1830 – 21 November 1891) was an Australian politician.

He was born at Yass Plains to pastoralist Frederick Manton and Marie Emelia Blanchard. His father was a shipbuilder, while his mother was born in Mauritius. A landed proprietor, on 5 September 1858 he married Caroline Stuart, with whom he had seven children. In January 1866, he was elected to the New South Wales Legislative Assembly for Williams, but he was forced to resign due to financial difficulty two months later. Manton died at Paddington in 1891.

New South Wales Legislative Assembly
Preceded by Marshall Burdekin	Member for Williams; 1866	Succeeded by John Nowlan
