= Charles Lee (Australian politician) =

Australian politician (1842–1926)

The Honourable Charles Lee
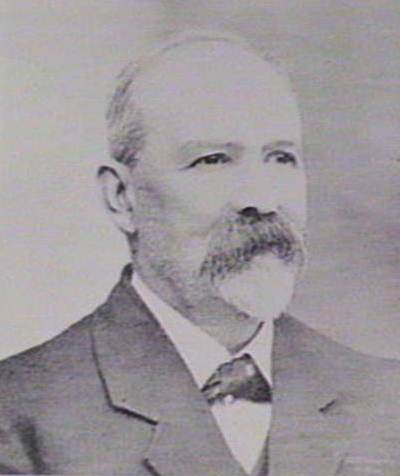

New South Wales Secretary for Public Works
- In office 3 July 1899 – 13 September 1899
- Premier: George Reid
- Preceded by: James Young
- Succeeded by: Edward O'Sullivan
- In office 29 August 1904 – 20 October 1910
- Premier: Sir Joseph Carruthers; Charles Wade
- Preceded by: Walter Bennett
- Succeeded by: Arthur Griffith

Member of the New South Wales Parliament for Tenterfield
- In office 20 November 1884 – 18 February 1920
- Preceded by: Henry Parkes
- Succeeded by: District abolished

Personal details
- Born: 13 November 1842 Parramatta, Colony of New South Wales
- Died: 16 August 1926 (aged 83) Tenterfield, New South Wales, Australia
- Spouse: Clara Jane Tinsdale
- Relations: Benjamin Lee (brother)
- Children: LtCol. Charles Arthur Lee; Cpt. Frederick Edward Lee; Sgt. Lionel Kenneth Lee
- Occupation: Shopkeeper

Charles Alfred Lee (13 November 1842 – 16 August 1926) was an Australian shopkeeper and conservative parliamentarian who served in the New South Wales Legislative Assembly for 35 years. Serving from 1884 for Tenterfield, he entered the Free Trade Party cabinet of George Reid in 1898 as Minister for Justice and briefly as Secretary for Public Works in 1899 until he returned to opposition in late 1899. Following Federation and the change of focus of the old party system in 1901, Lee was elected as the compromise leader of the new Liberal Reform Party and consequently the first official Leader of the Opposition. After leading the party to electoral defeat in 1901, he resigned owing to ill health in 1902. When the Liberal Reformers won office under Sir Joseph Carruthers in 1904, he was made Secretary for Public Works. He served with distinction, overseeing the expansion of rural infrastructure, under Carruthers and his successor Charles Wade, until the government lost office to the Labor Party in 1910. He thereafter served in the backbenches until his retirement to Tenterfield in 1920, where he died six years later.

== Early years and background ==
Charles Alfred Lee was born in Parramatta, New South Wales in 1842, the son of Benjamin Lee, a Waterloo veteran, publican and landowner, and Lucy Ann Poulton, who had emigrated to New South Wales in 1829. His elder brother, Benjamin Lee, was also to become a NSW politician and civil servant. Educated at West Maitland Grammar School, Charles entered a Maitland store, rising to become partner. On 18 July 1865 in Penrith he married Clara Jane Tindale. They were to have six sons, Walter Lee (1868–1925), Lieutenant Colonel Charles Arthur Lee (1874–1918), Captain Frederick Edward Lee (1875–?), Reginald Lee (1878–?), Sergeant Lionel Kenneth Lee (1882–1919) and Cecil Lee (1885–1895); and four daughters, Clara Isabel Stuart (1870–1953), Constance Maude Addison (1872–1949), Emilie Mabel Lee (1877–?) and Ruby Violet Lee (1880–1881).

In 1869, Lee moved with his family to Tenterfield, in northern New South Wales, "for the sake of the bracing climate of New England", where he purchased Maryland Stores. Lee eventually rose to hold various prominent positions within Tenterfield society, being appointed a Postmaster in 1872 and as the district Coroner from 1873 to 1876. Lee entered local politics when he was elected as an Alderman on the first Tenterfield Municipal Council in 1872–1876 and was Mayor from September 1875, to February 1876. Settling in his large pastoral property, 'Claremont', Lee became President of the Prince Albert Memorial Hospital Board, the Tenterfield Railway League, and the School of Arts.

== Political career ==
Retiring from his business, Lee was elected to the New South Wales Legislative Assembly seat of Tenterfield uncontested on 20 November 1884, when the previous member, Henry Parkes, resigned. Joining the Free Trade Party in 1887, Lee aligned himself with rural issues and rights of landowners, eventually joining the Farmers' and Settlers' Association of New South Wales. Australian Town and Country reported: "In his electorate he has been always associated with the progress of local institutions. He is a not frequent speaker in Parliament; but when he does speak, he is brief, effective and to the point."

On 7 December 1893 Lee carried an adjournment motion in Parliament which censured the Attorney General Edmund Barton and the Minister for Justice Richard O'Connor for their acceptance of private legal briefs to act against New South Wales Government Railways, leading to their resignation and the prorogation of the parliament. On 27 August 1898, Lee rose to become Minister of Justice in the Free Trader government of George Reid, introducing prison libraries, lights in prison cells and nightdresses for female prisoners. He served in this capacity until his promotion on 3 July 1899 as the Secretary for Public Works. He served in this capacity only briefly when on 13 September 1899, Reid's government fell to William Lyne's Protectionists. He sat on the royal commission on city railway extension in 1897.

In April 1901 Lee was elected as the compromise leader of the new Liberal Reform Party of New South Wales, which had emerged from the former Free Trade Party, and consequently the first official Leader of the Opposition, after the withdrawal of the favoured candidate Joseph Carruthers. Lee's party was divided and unprepared for the elections ten weeks later, at which they were defeated. Although respected as an MP, Lee's genial and quiet manner proved highly unsuited for leadership and he eventually resigned on 17 September 1902 in favour of Carruthers.

When the Liberal Reform Party under Carruthers won the 1904 election, Lee was appointed as Secretary for Public Works on 30 August 1904. Serving through Carruther's successor, Charles Wade, to the government's fall on 20 October 1910, Lee presided over an extensive public works programme. Among the projects he helped to develop were the Murrumbidgee Irrigation Area, Cataract Dam for the Sydney water supply, rail infrastructure expansion, the construction of the Burrinjuck Dam, and the creation of the town of Leeton, which was named after him.

During his later years in parliament he remained an advocate for small landowners and rural affairs and served until his retirement from parliament on 18 February 1920, after thirty-six years as an MP. Thereafter, Lee lived in quiet retirement at Claremont, Tenterfield, until his death on 16 August 1926. He was buried in the Tenterfield cemetery, survived by three daughters and two sons. Two of his sons were killed in World War I: Lieutenant Colonel Charles Arthur Lee (1874–1918) had died after returning home of complications arising from shell shock, and Sergeant Lionel Kenneth Lee (1882–1919) from Typhus while in Egypt. The Tenterfield Star's obituary for Lee said his death brought to an end a "long and eventful chapter in the history of Tenterfield and northern NSW."

New South Wales Legislative Assembly
Preceded by Henry Parkes	Member for Tenterfield; 1884–1920	District abolished
Political offices
Preceded by Albert Gould	Minister of Justice; 1898–1899	Succeeded by John Hughes
Preceded by James Young	Secretary for Public Works; 1899	Succeeded by Edward O'Sullivan
Preceded by George Reid	Leader of the Opposition; 1901–1902	Succeeded by Joseph Carruthers
Preceded by Walter Bennett	Secretary for Public Works; 1904–1910	Succeeded by Arthur Griffith
Party political offices
New political party	Leader of the Liberal Reform Party; 1901–1902	Succeeded by Joseph Carruthers
Civic offices
Preceded by Edward Whereat	Mayor of Tenterfield; September 1875–February 1876	Succeeded by Erasmus Hyles
