= Electoral district of Hunter =

Former state electoral district of New South Wales, Australia

The Hunter was an electoral district of the Legislative Assembly in the Australian state of New South Wales created in 1859 and partly replacing Durham on the Hunter River. It was abolished in 1894.

== Members for Hunter ==
Member	Party	Period
Richard Jones	None	1859–1860
Isidore Blake	None	1860–1861
John Burns	None	1861–1869
John Dillon	None	1869–1872
John Burns	None	1872–1887
John Burns	Free Trade	1887–1889
Robert Scobie	Free Trade	1889–1894

== Election results ==
1891 New South Wales colonial election: The Hunter Friday 19 June
Party	Candidate	Votes	%	±%
Free Trade	Robert Scobie (elected)	677	49.6	
Protectionist	James Pritchard	455	33.4	
Protectionist	John Connelly	232	17.0	
Total formal votes		1,364	98.0	
Informal votes		28	2.0	
Turnout		1,392	70.3	
Free Trade hold				
