= William Munnings Arnold =

Australian politician

The Honourable William Arnold
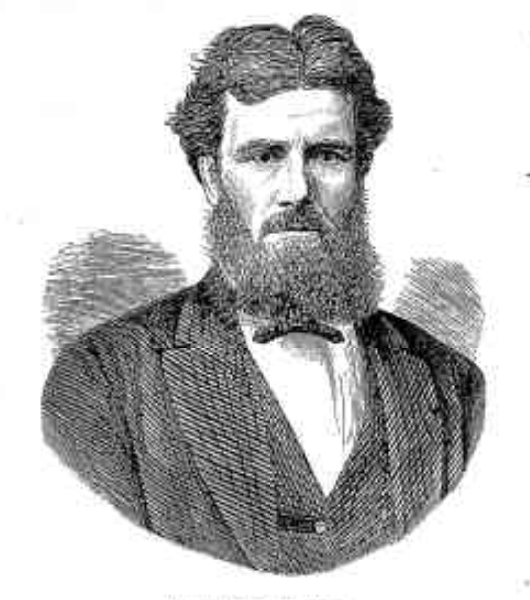
- William Munnings Arnold, MLA, NSW, c1872

Secretary for Public Works
- In office 9 March 1860 – 15 October 1863
- Preceded by: Geoffrey Eagar
- Succeeded by: Arthur Holroyd

Secretary for Public Works
- In office 3 February 1865 – 19 October 1865
- Preceded by: Arthur Holroyd
- Succeeded by: Thomas Smart

Secretary for Lands
- In office 20 October 1865 – 31 October 1865
- Preceded by: John Robertson
- Succeeded by: John Robertson

Speaker of the New South Wales Legislative Assembly
- In office 1 November 1865 – 1 March 1875
- Preceded by: John Hay
- Succeeded by: George Allen

Personal details
- Born: 26 October 1819 Ellough, Suffolk, England
- Died: 1 March 1875 (aged 55) Paterson, New South Wales

William Munnings Arnold (10 October 1819 – 1 March 1875) was an Australian politician, a member of the New South Wales Legislative Assembly from 1856 until his death. He held numerous ministerial positions between 1860 and 1865 including Secretary for Public Works and Secretary for Lands. He was the Speaker between 1865 and 1875.

== Early life ==
Arnold was born in the village of Ellough in Suffolk, England and was the son of an Anglican clergyman. He was educated at home and then at private schools in Lowestoft and High Wycombe. Arnold migrated to Australia in 1839 and made a substantial fortune from investments in the pastoral industry and gold trading. He invested in a number of large properties on the Paterson River in which he drowned during major flooding in 1875.

== State Parliament ==
Arnold was elected at the 1856 election to the first parliament of New South Wales after the granting of responsible government. With Richard Jones and Samuel Gordon, he was elected to the three member seat of Durham. He retained this seat until 1859 and then represented the seat of Paterson until his death. He was noted for his radically democratic views on electoral reform including universal manhood suffrage and the distribution of electorates based on population.

== Government ==
Arnold was appointed to the position of Secretary for Public Works in the first ministry of John Robertson, and the third and fourth ministries of Charles Cowper. He also served briefly as Secretary for Lands in Cowper's fourth government.

== Speakership ==
Arnold served as the Assembly's fourth Speaker between 1865 and 1875. He was noted for his objectivity and fairness as speaker and his decisions were rarely questioned by either the government or opposition.

Parliament of New South Wales
New South Wales Legislative Assembly
New parliament	Member for Durham; 1856 – 1859; With: Richard Jones; Samuel Gordon	District replaced by Paterson
New district	Member for Paterson; 1859 – 1875	Succeeded by Herbert Brown
Preceded by John Hay	Speaker of the New South Wales Legislative Assembly; 1865 – 1875	Succeeded by George Allen
Political offices
Preceded by Geoffrey Eagar	Secretary for Public Works; 1860 – 1863	Succeeded by Arthur Holroyd
Preceded by Arthur Holroyd	Secretary for Public Works; 1865	Succeeded by Thomas Smart
Preceded by John Robertson	Secretary for Lands; 1865	Succeeded by John Robertson
