= Electoral district of Paterson =

Former state electoral district of New South Wales, Australia

The Paterson New South Wales—Legislative Assembly
- State: New South Wales
- Dates current: 1859–1880
- Namesake: The Paterson River
- Coordinates: 32°36′08.41″S 151°37′02.27″E

The Patterson was an electoral district for the Legislative Assembly in the Australian State of New South Wales from 1859 to 1880. It was named after the Paterson River, which was named after Colonel William Paterson. The river flows from Barrington Tops to the Hunter River at Morpeth. The district was created in 1858 replacing part of the 3 member district of Durham and comprised the midland and northern parts of the County of Durham. In 1880 it was replaced by Durham.

== Members for Patterson ==
Member	Party	Term
William Arnold	None	1859–1875
Herbert Brown	None	1875–1880

== Election results ==
1877 New South Wales colonial election: The Paterson Saturday 27 October
Candidate	Votes	%
Herbert Brown (re-elected)	unopposed	
