= Richard Jones (1816–1892) =

Australian journalist and politician (1816–1892)

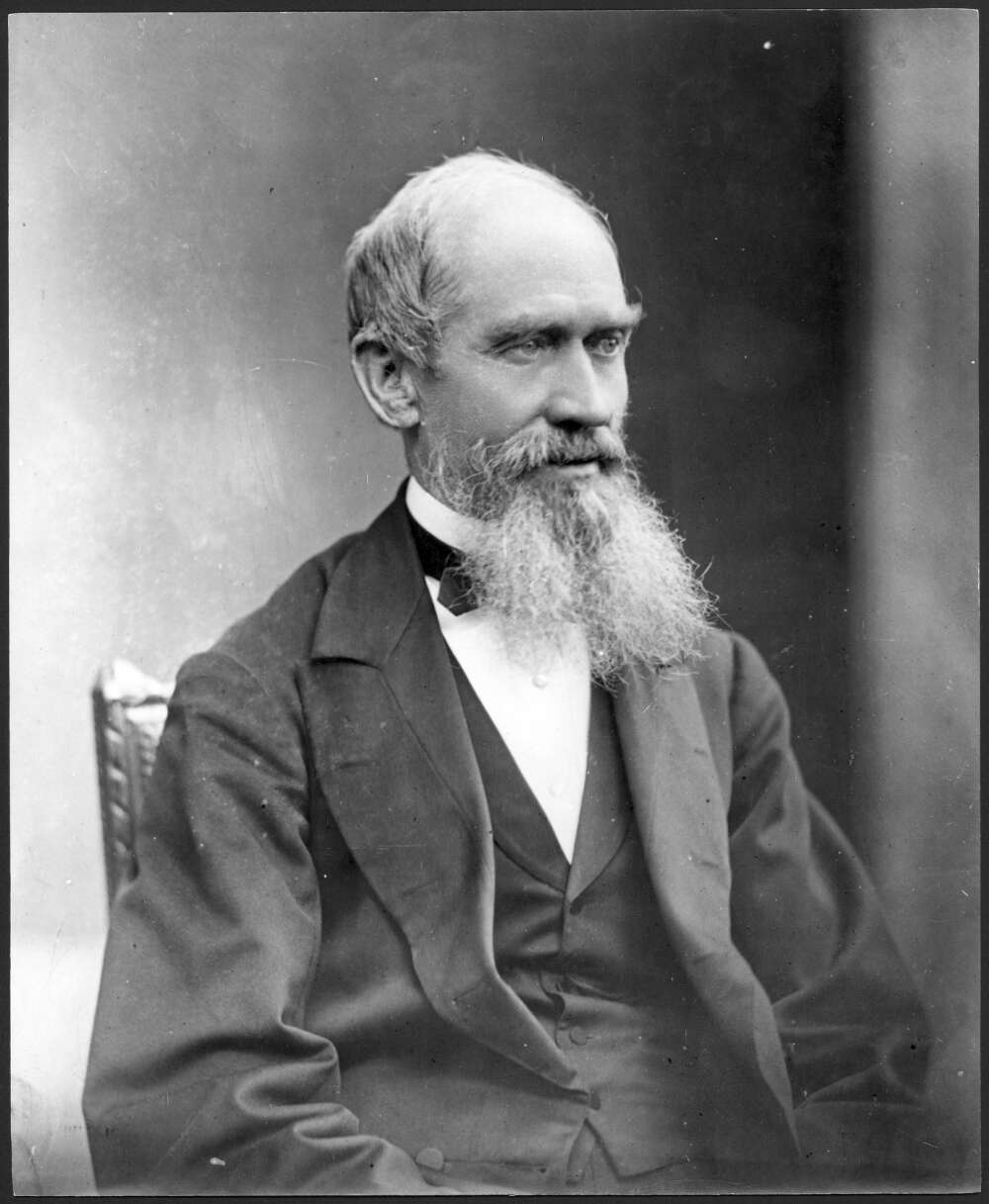

7th Colonial Treasurer of New South Wales
- In office 7 September 1857 – 3 January 1858
- Preceded by: Stuart Donaldson
- Succeeded by: Robert Campbell

Personal details
- Born: 14 October 1816 Liverpool
- Died: 25 August 1892 (aged 75) Sydney

Richard Jones (14 October 1816 – 25 August 1892) was an Australian journalist, company director and politician. He was a member of the New South Wales Legislative Assembly between 1856 and 1860 and was the Colonial Treasurer for 118 days.

== Early life ==
Jones was the son of a Liverpool innkeeper, but he was orphaned at a young age. He was educated in free schools and became an apprentice printer at age 15. Due to indifferent health, Jones emigrated to Sydney in 1838 and worked as a compositor. At this time he became interested in colonial politics and formed a friendship with Henry Parkes, a fellow liberal. In 1843 he established the Maitland Mercury, which soon became one of the colony's leading newspapers. Jones was involved in numerous public organizations in the Maitland region including the anti-transportation league, Lower Hunter Agricultural Society and Maitland School of Arts.

Jones returned to Sydney in 1855 and after retiring from politics became the chairman of the Commercial Banking Company of Sydney. He was also a director of numerous other colonial companies including the Australian Gas Light Company.

== Colonial Parliament ==
Jones was unsuccessful in one attempt to enter the Legislative Council prior to the establishment of responsible self-government in 1856. However, at the first election under the new constitution he was elected to the Legislative Assembly as one of the three members for Durham. He retained the seat until it was abolished at the 1859 election. He then represented the new seat of Hunter until his retirement from politics in 1860. He was an active member of the Assembly and was a member of numerous committees. He contributed significantly to the passage of reforms to the electoral act which allowed for a wide male franchise.

== Government ==
Jones was New South Wales' Colonial Treasurer for 119 days during the term of the second government of Charles Cowper. The Governor, Sir William Denison, called on Jones to form a government when the premiership of William Forster collapsed in March 1860. However, Jones doubted his support in the assembly and recommended that the Governor give his commission to John Robertson. He retired from politics during the next month.

== Business ==
Jones was chairman of the Commercial Banking Company of Sydney for many years.

New South Wales Legislative Assembly
New assembly	Member for Durham; 1856 – 1859; With: William Arnold; Samuel Gordon	District abolished
New district	Member for Hunter; 1859 – 1860	Succeeded by Isidore Blake
Political offices
Preceded by Stuart Donaldson	Colonial Treasurer; 1857 – 1858	Succeeded by Robert Campbell
