= Isidore Blake =

Australian politician and judge

Isidore John Blake (1812 – 10 October 1882) was an Irish-born Australian politician and judge.

He was born at Portarlington in Queens County to army captain Richard Blake and his wife Charlotte. He attended Trinity College, Dublin, and in 1838 was called to the bar. In 1840 he married Henrietta Eyre Maunsell, with whom he had six children. By 1854 he was practising law as a barrister in Sydney. His wife died in 1858, the year he was appointed to the New South Wales Legislative Council. He left the Council in 1859 and was elected to the New South Wales Legislative Assembly for Hunter in 1860, but he resigned in 1861 on his appointment as a District Court judge. On 15 January 1862 he married widow Jane Townsend; she died in 1866 and his third marriage, on 5 October 1871, was to Amelia Caroline Bressow. In 1867 he had moved to Queensland, and in 1878 he was appointed to the Queensland Central District Court. He died at Hamilton in 1882.

New South Wales Legislative Assembly
Preceded by Richard Jones	Member for Hunter; 1860–1861	Succeeded by John Burns
