= Herbert Brown (Australian politician) =

Australian politician

Herbert Harrington Brown (12 March 1839 – 1 July 1929) was an Australian politician.

He was born at Parramatta to John and Charlotte Brown, who farmed in the upper Paterson district from 1843. He was educated at Newcastle and Cook's River, and on 4 November 1860 married Harriet Lindeman, with whom he had six children. He was elected to the New South Wales Legislative Assembly as the member for Paterson at the by-election in 1875. The seat was replaced by Durham in 1880, and Brown held the seat until his defeat in 1898. When the party system emerged he was initially a Free Trader, but he drifted towards the Protectionists over the years. He died in Sydney on 1 July 1929 (aged 90).

New South Wales Legislative Assembly
Preceded by William Arnold	Member for Paterson; 1875 – 1880	District abolished
New district	Member for Durham; 1880 – 1898	Succeeded by Walter Bennett
