= Electoral district of Tenterfield =

Former state electoral district of New South Wales, Australia

Tenterfield was an electoral district of the Legislative Assembly in the Australian state of New South Wales, originally created in 1859, partly replacing New England and Macleay, and named after, and including, Tenterfield. In 1920, with the introduction of proportional representation, it was absorbed into Northern Tablelands, along with Armidale and Gough. It was recreated in 1927 and abolished in 1981 and partly replaced by the recreated Northern Tablelands.

For its entire tenure as a single-member seat, it was held by the Bruxner family of the National Country Party. Future Deputy Premier and longtime party leader Michael Bruxner won the seat in 1927, handing it to son Tim in 1962.

== Members for Tenterfield ==
First incarnation (1859–1920)
Member	Party	Term
Randolph Nott	None	1859–1860
Robert Meston	None	1860–1861
Hugh Gordon	None	1861–1869
Colin Fraser	None	1869–1872
Robert Abbott	None	1872–1877
John Dillon	None	1877–1882
Augustus Fraser	None	1882
Sir Henry Parkes	None	1882–1884
Charles Lee	None	1884–1887
Charles Lee	Free Trade	1887–1901
Charles Lee	Liberal Reform	1901–1917
Charles Lee	Nationalist	1917–1920
Single-member (1927–1981)
Member	Party	Term
Michael Bruxner	Country	1927–1962
Tim Bruxner	Country	1962–1975
Tim Bruxner	National Country	1975–1981

== Election results ==
1978 New South Wales state election: Tenterfield
Party	Candidate	Votes	%	±%
National Country	Tim Bruxner	11,819	59.4	−6.6
Labor	Jim Curran	8,093	40.6	+6.6
Total formal votes		19,912	98.6	−0.2
Informal votes		274	1.4	+0.2
Turnout		20,186	93.4	−0.2
National Country hold		Swing	−6.6	
