= John Nowlan =

Irish-born Australian politician

John Nowlan (1821 – 9 March 1895) was an Irish-born Australian politician.

He was born at Kilkenny to pastoralist Timothy Nowlan and Elizabeth Robertson. He migrated to Tasmania at a young age and then farmed in the Port Phillip district. He then moved to Maitland, where he bred cattle. In 1866 he was elected to the New South Wales Legislative Assembly for Williams, serving until his retirement in 1874. Nowlan died at West Maitland in 1895.

New South Wales Legislative Assembly
Preceded by Frederick Manton	Member for Williams; 1866–1874	Succeeded by William Watson
