= Electoral district of Williams (New South Wales) =

Former state electoral district of New South Wales, Australia

The Williams was an electoral district of the Legislative Assembly in the Australian state of New South Wales, created in 1859 in the northern part of the Hunter Region and named after the Williams River. In 1880, it was replaced by Durham and Gloucester.

== Members for Williams ==
Member	Party	Period
Stephen Dark	None	1859–1860
Alexander Campbell	None	1860
William Allen	None	1860–1864
Marshall Burdekin	None	1864–1866
Frederick Manton	None	1866–1866
John Nowlan	None	1866–1874
William Watson	None	1874–1877
William Johnston	None	1877–1880

== Election results ==
1877 New South Wales colonial election: The Williams Thursday 1 November
Candidate	Votes	%
William Johnston (re-elected)	516	51.0
John Booth (defeated)	495	49.0
Total formal votes	1,011	96.1
Informal votes	41	3.9
Turnout	1,052	70.7

William Johnston had won the seat at the 1877 by-election. John Booth was one of the sitting members for East Macquarie.
