= Liberal Reform Party (Australia) =

Australian political party

- Leader: Charles Lee; Joseph Carruthers; Charles Wade
- Founded: 1887
- Dissolved: 1917
- Merged into: Nationalist Party
- Headquarters: Sydney
- Ideology: Free trade Temperance; Liberal conservatism Anti-socialism
- Political position: Centre-right

The Liberal Reform Party, earlier known as the Liberal Party of New South Wales and the Free Trade Party, was an Australian political party in New South Wales from 1887 to 1917.

The party originated in colonial New South Wales as the Free Trade Party, formed by Henry Parkes and his supporters prior to the 1887 general election. Its dominant figures were Parkes and his successor George Reid, who both served terms as premier of New South Wales and supported free trade principles over protectionism in the major debate policy of the time. After the federation of the Australian colonies, the party was renamed the Liberal Party for the 1901 state election and later adopted the Liberal Reform name after Joseph Carruthers became leader. It absorbed the Progressive Party around 1907. The party eventually merged into the new Nationalist Party following the Australian Labor Party split of 1916.

== History ==
=== Pre-Federation ===
The Free Trade Party was formed in January 1887 to contest the following month's general election, with a central council formed to assist the re-election campaign of Premier Henry Parkes and his supporters. Its main opposition was the Protectionist Party, which coalesced around the same time in response to the "fiscal question" of whether the colony should pursue a high-tariff policy of protectionism or a low-tariff policy of free trade. The two parties were the first equivalent to modern political parties in New South Wales, with Parkes' government being "the first administration since the coming of responsible government to hold office with the majority support of a body of declared followers who subscribed, nominally if not in fact, to a common political principle". The Free Trade Party distinguished itself as a parliamentary party from the extra-parliamentary Free Trade Association formed in 1885, with the bodies maintaining separate central councils. The party had a limited branch structure and did not organise outside of elections.

In 1889, the parliamentary Free Traders formed a new Liberal Political Association to support their activities, which subsequently merged with the Free Trade Association to form the Free Trade and Liberal Association in May 1889. This new organisation aimed to "unite the parliamentary and extra-parliamentary sections", with its first annual conference held in August 1889.

=== Post-Federation ===
Following federation in 1901, Reid and other senior Free Traders transitioned to the new federal parliament. Lyne resigned as premier in March 1901 and was succeeded by John See. Their party, previously known as the Protectionists, had contested the 1898 election as the National Federal Party on an explicitly pro-federation platform. He was succeeded by Charles Lee in April 1901. With the "fiscal question" moved to the federal sphere, the Free Trade Party renamed itself the Liberal Party of New South Wales in the same month. However at the 1901 state election the party continued to present itself as "the party of free trade and low taxation, opposing the wasteful and interventionist administration of the government".

Lee's leadership of the Liberal Party proved unsuccessful and he resigned in favour of Joseph Carruthers in September 1902. Carruthers created the Liberal and Reform Association to support the parliamentary party. According to Hogan & Clune (2001), from that point on "there is some confusion about the name of the party [...] Carruthers seems to have wanted to change the name from Liberal to Liberal and Reform, but the older name proved difficult to replace and eventually won out". In some newspapers it was called the Reform Party.

The Progressive Party's vote collapsed at the 1904 election and many of its members then joined the Liberal Reform Party. By 1907, the Liberal Reform Party was left as the main centre-right party in New South Wales.

It drew much of its support from Protestant and Temperance groups.

In 1916, the Liberal Reform Party formed a coalition with the pro-conscription elements of the state Labor Party under Premier William Holman. In 1917, Liberal Reform merged with the pro-conscription elements of Labor to form the New South Wales branch of the Nationalist Party of Australia. As was the case with the federal Nationalists, the new party was dominated by former Liberal Reformers, but Holman was the merged party's leader.

== Leaders ==
#	Leader	Term start	Term end	Time in office	Premier
1	Charles Lee	April 1901	17 September 1902	1 year, 5 months	No
2	Joseph Carruthers	17 September 1902	1 October 1907	5 years, 15 days	Yes (1904–1907)
3	Charles Wade	2 October 1907	17 February 1917	9 years, 138 days	Yes (1907–1910)

== State election results ==
Election	Seats won	±	Total votes	%	Position	Leader
1901	37 / 125	▼8	65,420	33.55%	Opposition	Charles Lee
1904	45 / 90	▲8	176,796	44.58%	Minority government	Joseph Carruthers
1907	45 / 90	0	210,456	45.91%	Minority government	Joseph Carruthers
1910	37 / 90	▼8	246,360	43.03%	Opposition	Charles Wade
1913	38 / 90	▲1	298,899	44.70%	Opposition	Charles Wade

== Sources ==
- Loveday, Peter; Martin, A. W.; Weller, Patrick (1977). "New South Wales". In Peter Loveday; A. W. Martin; R. S. Parker (eds.). The Emergence of the Australian Party System. Hale & Iremonger. ISBN 0908094035.
- Hogan, Michael; Clune, David, eds. (2001). The People's Choice: Electoral Politics in 20th Century New South Wales, Volume One 1901-1927. Parliament of New South Wales and University of Sydney. ISBN 0909907390.
